= 2023 Palmetto Pro Open =

Tennis tournament

- Date: 12–18 June 2023
- Edition: 15th
- Category: ITF Women's World Tennis Tour
- Prize money: $60,000
- Surface: Hard / Outdoor
- Location: Sumter, United States

Champions

Singles
- (Ukraine) Yulia Starodubtseva

Doubles
- (United States) Maria Mateas / (United States) Anna Rogers
← 2022 ·	Palmetto Pro Open	· 2024 →

The 2023 Palmetto Pro Open was a professional tennis tournament played on outdoor hard courts. It was the fifteenth edition of the tournament, which was part of the 2023 ITF Women's World Tennis Tour. It took place in Sumter, South Carolina, United States, between 12 and 18 June 2023.

== Champions ==
=== Singles ===
- (Ukraine) Yulia Starodubtseva def. (India) Karman Thandi, 6–7^{(5–7)}, 7–5, 6–4

=== Doubles ===
- (United States) Maria Mateas / (United States) Anna Rogers def. (United States) McCartney Kessler / (Ukraine) Yulia Starodubtseva, 6–4, 6–7^{(3–7)}, [10–6]

== Singles main draw entrants ==
=== Seeds ===
Country	Player	Rank	Seed
CAN	Stacey Fung	259	1
IND	Karman Thandi	268	2
USA	Liv Hovde	297	3
USA	Ashley Lahey	336	4
USA	Maria Mateas	351	5
USA	Grace Min	368	6
IND	Rutuja Bhosale	386	7
UKR	Yulia Starodubtseva	391	8

- Rankings are as of 5 June 2023.

=== Other entrants ===
The following players received wildcards into the singles main draw:

- (United States) Usue Maitane Arconada
- (United States) Ashley Lahey
- (United States) Victoria Osuigwe
- (United States) Kennedy Shaffer

The following players received entry from the qualifying draw:

- (Mexico) Susana Alcaraz
- (United States) Piper Charney
- (United States) Haley Giavara
- (United States) Ava Markham
- (Slovakia) Martina Okáľová
- (Canada) Layne Sleeth
- (United States) Mary Stoiana
- (United States) Akasha Urhobo
