= 2024 Florida's Sports Coast Open – Doubles =

Doubles
- 2024 Florida's Sports Coast Open

Final
- Champions: (Lithuania) Justina Mikulskytė (United States) Christina Rosca
- Runners-up: (United States) Anna Rogers (United States) Alana Smith
- Score: 6–4, 6–4

Events
Singles	Doubles
← 2023 ·	Florida's Sports Coast Open	· 2025 →

Maria Kononova and Yulia Starodubtseva were the defending champions but Starodubtseva chose to compete in Rome instead. Kononova partnered alongside Maria Kozyreva but lost in the quarterfinals to Justina Mikulskytė and Christina Rosca.

Mikulskytė and Rosca won the title, defeating Anna Rogers and Alana Smith in the final, 6–4, 6–4.

== Seeds ==
1. (United States) Sophie Chang / (United States) Jamie Loeb (semifinals)
2. (United Kingdom) Emily Appleton / (United States) Quinn Gleason (semifinals)
3. (United States) Anna Rogers / (United States) Alana Smith (final)
4. Maria Kononova / Maria Kozyreva (quarterfinals)

== Draw ==
=== Key ===
- Q = Qualifier
- WC = Wild card
- LL = Lucky loser
- Alt = Alternate
- SE = Special exempt
- PR = Protected ranking
- ITF = ITF entry
- JE = Junior exempt
- w/o = Walkover
- r = Retired
- d = Defaulted
- SR = Special ranking

First round
1	(United States) S Chang (United States) J Loeb	6	6
(United States) V Hu (Argentina) M Krywoj	0	2
(United States) R Anderson (India) SR Bhamidipaty	1	4
(Canada) E Bouchard (Hungary) F Stollár	6	6
3	(United States) A Rogers (United States) A Smith	6	7^{7}
(Bulgaria) L Karatancheva (Switzerland) L Küng	0	6^{4}
(United States) V Osuigwe (United States) W Osuigwe	5	6	[7]
(Canada) K Cross (United States) J Daniel	7	3	[10]
(United States) E Kalieva (Canada) K Sebov	2	6^{5}
(Lithuania) J Mikulskytė (United States) C Rosca	6	7^{7}
WC	(United States) S Daavettila (United States) M Yamakita	1	2
4	M Kononova; M Kozyreva	6	6
(United States) UM Arconada (United States) M Mateas	7^{7}	6
WC	(Bulgaria) E Danailova (United States) S Frizelle	6^{3}	2
WC	(Canada) J Bui (France) M Partaud	1	0
2	(United Kingdom) E Appleton (United States) Q Gleason	6	6

Quarterfinals
1	(United States) S Chang (United States) J Loeb	4	7^{7}	[10]
(Canada) E Bouchard (Hungary) F Stollár	6	6^{5}	[8]
3	(United States) A Rogers (United States) A Smith	7	7^{7}
(Canada) K Cross (United States) J Daniel	5	6^{3}
(Lithuania) J Mikulskytė (United States) C Rosca	6	7^{7}
4	M Kononova; M Kozyreva	2	6^{5}
(United States) UM Arconada (United States) M Mateas	5	6	[2]
2	(United Kingdom) E Appleton (United States) Q Gleason	7	4	[10]

Semifinals
1	(United States) S Chang (United States) J Loeb	1	6	[6]
3	(United States) A Rogers (United States) A Smith	6	4	[10]
(Lithuania) J Mikulskytė (United States) C Rosca	0	6	[10]
2	(United Kingdom) E Appleton (United States) Q Gleason	6	1	[3]

Final
3	(United States) A Rogers (United States) A Smith	4	4
(Lithuania) J Mikulskytė (United States) C Rosca	6	6
