= 2023 Naples Women's World Tennis Tour =

Tennis tournament

- Date: 8–14 May 2023
- Edition: 13th
- Category: ITF Women's World Tennis Tour
- Prize money: $60,000
- Surface: Clay / Outdoor
- Location: Naples, United States

Champions

Singles
- (United States) Caroline Dolehide

Doubles
- (United States) Christina Rosca / (Australia) Astra Sharma
← 2023 ·	Naples Women's World Tennis Tour	· 2024 →

The 2023 Naples Women's World Tennis Tour was a professional tennis tournament played on outdoor clay courts. It was the thirteenth edition of the tournament, which was part of the 2023 ITF Women's World Tennis Tour. It took place in Naples, Florida, United States, between 8 and 14 May 2023.

== Champions ==
=== Singles ===
- (United States) Caroline Dolehide def. (Ukraine) Yulia Starodubtseva, 7–5, 7–5

=== Doubles ===
- (United States) Christina Rosca / (Australia) Astra Sharma def. (United States) Sophie Chang / (United States) Angela Kulikov, 6–1, 7–6^{(15–13)}

== Singles main draw entrants ==
=== Seeds ===
Country	Player	Rank	Seed
USA	Caroline Dolehide	123	1
USA	Kayla Day	183	2
MEX	Marcela Zacarías	197	3
ROU	Gabriela Lee	240	4
USA	Jamie Loeb	248	5
BRA	Gabriela Cé	257	6
AUS	Astra Sharma	263	7
MEX	Renata Zarazúa	265	8

- Rankings are as of 1 May 2023.

=== Other entrants ===
The following players received wildcards into the singles main draw:

- (United States) Sophia Cisse-Ignatiev
- (United States) Kaitlin Quevedo
- (United States) Akasha Urhobo
- (China) Zhou Muduo

The following player received entry into the singles main draw using a special ranking:

- (United States) Quinn Gleason

The following players received entry from the qualifying draw:

- (United States) Paris Corley
- (United States) Jaeda Daniel
- (United States) Hailey Giavara
- (United States) McCartney Kessler
- Maria Kononova
- (United States) Kylie McKenzie
- (United States) Victoria Osuigwe
- (Ukraine) Yulia Starodubtseva
