= 2024 Palmetto Pro Open – Singles =

Singles
- 2024 Palmetto Pro Open

Final
- Champion: (Canada) Carson Branstine
- Runner-up: (United States) Sophie Chang
- Score: 7–6^{(8–6)}, 6–7^{(6–8)}, 6–1

Events
Singles	Doubles
← 2023 ·	Palmetto Pro Open	· 2025 →

Yulia Starodubtseva was the defending champion but chose not to participate.

Carson Branstine won the title, defeating Sophie Chang in the final, 7–6^{(8–6)}, 6–7^{(6–8)}, 6–1.

== Seeds ==
1. (United States) Maria Mateas (semifinals)
2. (Serbia) Katarina Kozarov (first round)
3. (Canada) Stacey Fung (first round)
4. (United States) Allie Kiick (semifinals)
5. (India) Sahaja Yamalapalli (quarterfinals)
6. (United States) Akasha Urhobo (second round)
7. (Ukraine) Kateryna Volodko (second round)
8. (United States) Robin Anderson (second round)

== Draw ==
=== Key ===
- Q = Qualifier
- WC = Wild card
- LL = Lucky loser
- Alt = Alternate
- SE = Special exempt
- PR = Protected ranking
- ITF = ITF entry
- JE = Junior exempt
- w/o = Walkover
- r = Retired
- d = Defaulted
- SR = Special ranking

=== Finals ===
Semifinals
1	(United States) Maria Mateas	3	2
(Canada) Carson Branstine	6	6
4	(United States) Allie Kiick	4	3
(United States) Sophie Chang	6	6

Final
(Canada) Carson Branstine	7^{8}	6^{6}	6
(United States) Sophie Chang	6^{6}	7^{8}	1

=== Top half ===
First round
1	(United States) M Mateas	6	6
(United States) W Osuigwe	3	1
WC	(United States) UM Arconada	6	3	1
WC	(United States) A Noel	2	6	6
(United States) H Giavara	2	2
(United States) K Scott	6	6
Q	(United States) C Chavatipon	5	1
5	(India) S Yamalapalli	7	6
3	(Canada) S Fung	6	4	1
Q	(United States) A Rogers	4	6	6
(Canada) C Brace	0	6	5
Q	(United States) L Ma	6	1	7
(Canada) C Branstine	6	6
WC	(United States) M Stoiana	3	1
Q	(United States) E Burgić	6^{3}	6^{3}
8	(United States) R Anderson	7^{7}	7^{7}

Second round
1	(United States) M Mateas	6	6
WC	(United States) A Noel	3	2
(United States) K Scott	4	6	1
5	(India) S Yamalapalli	6	2	6
Q	(United States) A Rogers	0	6	4
Q	(United States) L Ma	6	4	2^{r}
(Canada) C Branstine	6^{5}	6	6
8	(United States) R Anderson	7^{7}	4	3

Quarterfinals
1	(United States) M Mateas	6	7
5	(India) S Yamalapalli	3	5
Q	(United States) A Rogers	3	7	2
(Canada) C Branstine	6	5	6

Semifinals
1	(United States) M Mateas	3	2
(Canada) C Branstine	6	6

=== Bottom half ===
First round
6	(United States) A Urhobo	6	6
Q	(United States) A Bowers	2	2
SR	(United States) C Harrison	6	6
Q	(United States) S Broadus	2	1
Q	M Kononova	4	2
(United States) V Hu	6	6
WC	(United States) J Daniel	1	2
4	(United States) A Kiick	6	6
7	(Ukraine) K Volodko	7	7
Q	(Argentina) M Krywoj	5	5
(United States) S Chang	6	6
M Kozyreva	3	4
(Japan) S Ishii	4	7^{7}	6
(United States) D Hewitt	6	6^{5}	4
(United States) J Failla	7	7
2	(Serbia) K Kozarov	5	5

Second round
6	(United States) A Urhobo	6^{4}	3
SR	(United States) C Harrison	7^{7}	6
(United States) V Hu	3	2
4	(United States) A Kiick	6	6
7	(Ukraine) K Volodko	5	1
(United States) S Chang	7	6
(Japan) S Ishii	2	4
(United States) J Failla	6	6

Quarterfinals
SR	(United States) C Harrison	0	2
4	(United States) A Kiick	6	6
(United States) S Chang	6	6
(United States) J Failla	3	1

Semifinals
4	(United States) A Kiick	4	3
(United States) S Chang	6	6
