= 2023 Naples Women's World Tennis Tour – Doubles =

Doubles
- 2023 Naples Women's World Tennis Tour

Final
- Champions: (United States) Christina Rosca (Australia) Astra Sharma
- Runners-up: (United States) Sophie Chang (United States) Angela Kulikov
- Score: 6–1, 7–6^{(15–13)}

Events
Singles	Doubles
← 2023 ·	Naples Women's World Tennis Tour	· 2024 →

Reese Brantmeier and Makenna Jones were the defending champions but chose not to participate.

Christina Rosca and Astra Sharma won the title, defeating Sophie Chang and Angela Kulikov in the final, 6–1, 7–6^{(15–13)}.

== Seeds ==
1. (United States) Sophie Chang / (United States) Angela Kulikov (final)
2. (United States) Quinn Gleason / (United States) Jamie Loeb (first round)
3. (United States) Anna Rogers / (Mexico) Renata Zarazúa (quarterfinals, withdrew)
4. (United States) Christina Rosca / (Australia) Astra Sharma (champions)

== Draw ==
=== Key ===
- Q = Qualifier
- WC = Wild card
- LL = Lucky loser
- Alt = Alternate
- SE = Special exempt
- PR = Protected ranking
- ITF = ITF entry
- JE = Junior exempt
- w/o = Walkover
- r = Retired
- d = Defaulted
- SR = Special ranking

First round
1	(United States) S Chang (United States) A Kulikov	6	6
WC	(United States) J Ceas (United States) S Cisse-Ignatiev	1	0
(United States) R McAdoo (Bolivia) N Zeballos	3	5
WC	(United States) H Giavara (United States) K Pierre-Louis	6	7
3	(United States) A Rogers (Mexico) R Zarazúa	7^{7}	7
(Germany) J Jebawy (Japan) Y Naito	6^{2}	5
(Australia) A Osborne (Ukraine) Y Starodubtseva	2	6	[10]
(Serbia) K Kozarov (United States) T Ng	6	4	[6]
(United States) V Osuigwe (United States) W Osuigwe	6	6
WC	(Mexico) F Naves Anzaldo (China) M Zhou	0	1
(United States) J Daniel (United States) M Kessler	4	2
4	(United States) C Rosca (Australia) A Sharma	6	6
(United States) K Quevedo (United States) A Urhobo	6	6
(Bulgaria) E Tchakarova (Bulgaria) V Tchakarova	0	4
(United States) P Corley; M Kononova	6	2	[10]
2	(United States) Q Gleason (United States) J Loeb	3	6	[3]

Quarterfinals
1	(United States) S Chang (United States) A Kulikov	w/o
WC	(United States) H Giavara (United States) K Pierre-Louis
3	(United States) A Rogers (Mexico) R Zarazúa
(Australia) A Osborne (Ukraine) Y Starodubtseva	w/o
(United States) V Osuigwe (United States) W Osuigwe	1	7^{7}	[5]
4	(United States) C Rosca (Australia) A Sharma	6	6^{5}	[10]
(United States) K Quevedo (United States) A Urhobo	4	7	[10]
(United States) P Corley; M Kononova	6	5	[2]

Semifinals
1	(United States) S Chang (United States) A Kulikov	6	6
(Australia) A Osborne (Ukraine) Y Starodubtseva	4	4
4	(United States) C Rosca (Australia) A Sharma	6	6
(United States) K Quevedo (United States) A Urhobo	1	2

Final
1	(United States) S Chang (United States) A Kulikov	1	6^{13}
4	(United States) C Rosca (Australia) A Sharma	6	7^{15}
