= 2024 Palmetto Pro Open =

Tennis tournament

- Date: 3–9 June 2024
- Edition: 16th
- Category: ITF Women's World Tennis Tour
- Prize money: $60,000
- Surface: Hard / Outdoor
- Location: Sumter, South Carolina, United States

Champions

Singles
- (Canada) Carson Branstine

Doubles
- (Spain) Alicia Herrero Liñana / (Argentina) Melany Krywoj
← 2023 ·	Palmetto Pro Open	· 2025 →

The 2024 Palmetto Pro Open was a professional tennis tournament playing on outdoor hard courts. It was the sixteenth edition of the tournament, which was part of the 2024 ITF Women's World Tennis Tour. It took place in Sumter, South Carolina, United States, between 3 and 9 June 2024.

== Champions ==
=== Singles ===
- (Canada) Carson Branstine def. (United States) Sophie Chang, 7–6^{(8–6)}, 6–7^{(6–8)}, 6–1

=== Doubles ===
- (Spain) Alicia Herrero Liñana / (Argentina) Melany Krywoj def. (United States) Sophie Chang / (United States) Dalayna Hewitt, 6–3, 6–3

== Singles main draw entrants ==
=== Seeds ===
Country	Player	Rank	Seed
USA	Maria Mateas	260	1
SRB	Katarina Kozarov	311	2
CAN	Stacey Fung	313	3
USA	Allie Kiick	318	4
IND	Sahaja Yamalapalli	323	5
USA	Akasha Urhobo	327	6
UKR	Kateryna Volodko	331	7
USA	Robin Anderson	336	8

- Rankings are as of 27 May 2024.

=== Other entrants ===
The following players received wildcards into the singles main draw:

- (United States) Usue Maitane Arconada
- (United States) Jaeda Daniel
- (United States) Alexa Noel
- (United States) Mary Stoiana

The following player received entry into the singles main draw using a special ranking:

- (United States) Catherine Harrison

The following players received entry from the qualifying draw:

- (United States) Ashton Bowers
- (United States) Savannah Broadus
- (United States) Ema Burgić
- (United States) Charlotte Chavatipon
- Maria Kononova
- (Argentina) Melany Krywoj
- (United States) Lea Ma
- (United States) Anna Rogers
