= Iva Jovic career statistics =

Career finals
Discipline	Type	Won	Lost	Total
Singles	Grand Slam	–	–	–
Singles	WTA Finals	–	–	–
Singles	WTA 1000	–	–	–
Singles	WTA 500	2	0	2
Singles	WTA 250	0	1	1
Singles	Olympics	–	–	–
Singles	Total	2	1	3
Doubles	Grand Slam	–	–	–
Doubles	WTA Finals	–	–	–
Doubles	WTA 1000	–	–	–
Doubles	WTA 500	–	–	–
Doubles	WTA 250	–	–	–
Doubles	Olympics	–	–	–
Doubles	Total	0	0	0

This is a list of career statistics of American tennis player Iva Jovic.

== Performance timeline ==
Key
W	F	SF	QF	#R	RR	Q#	DNQ	A	NH

(W) winner; (F) finalist; (SF) semifinalist; (QF) quarterfinalist; (#R) rounds 4, 3, 2, 1; (RR) round-robin stage; (Q#) qualification round; (DNQ) did not qualify; (A) absent; (NH) not held; (SR) strike rate (events won / competed); (W–L) win–loss record.

Only main-draw results in WTA Tour, Grand Slam tournaments, Billie Jean King Cup, United Cup, Hopman Cup and Olympic Games are included in win–loss records.

=== Singles ===
Current through the 2026 Ningbo Open.

Tournament	2024	2025	2026	SR	W–L	Win %
Grand Slam tournaments
Australian Open	A	2R	QF	0 / 2	5–2	71%
French Open	A	2R	3R	0 / 2	3–2	60%
Wimbledon	A	1R	4R	0 / 2	3–2	60%
US Open	2R	2R	4R	0 / 3	5–3	63%
Win–Loss	1–1	3–4	12–4	0 / 9	16–9	64%
National representation
Summer Olympics	A	NH		0 / 0	0–0	–
Billie Jean King Cup	A	A	QR	0 / 1	0–2	0%
WTA 1000 tournaments
Qatar Open	A	A	A	0 / 0	0–0	–
Dubai Championships	A	A	3R	0 / 1	2–1	67%
Indian Wells Open	Q1	2R	2R	0 / 2	1–2	33%
Miami Open	A	A	3R	0 / 1	1–1	50%
Madrid Open	A	A	3R	0 / 1	1–1	50%
Italian Open	A	A	4R	0 / 1	2–1	67%
Canadian Open	A	A	3R	0 / 1	1–1	50%
Cincinnati Open	A	3R	3R	0 / 2	3–2	60%
China Open	A	2R	4R	0 / 2	2–2	50%
Wuhan Open	A	3R	3R	0 / 2	2–2	50%
Win–Loss	0–0	4–4	11–9	0 / 13	15–13	54%
Career statistics
	2024	2025	2026	SR	W–L	Win %
Tournaments	1	11	21	Career total: 33		
Titles	0	1	1	Career total: 2		
Finals	0	1	2	Career total: 3		
Hard Win–Loss	1–1	12–7	28–13	2 / 23	41–21	66%
Clay Win–Loss	0–0	2–2	8–5	0 / 7	10–7	59%
Grass Win–Loss	0–0	0–1	6–2	0 / 3	6–3	67%
Overall Win–Loss	1–1	14–10	42–20	2 / 33	57–31	65%
Win %	50%	58%	68%	Career total: 65%		
Year-end ranking (Note: 2023 Year-end ranking: 647)	206	35		$3,888,981		

== WTA Tour finals ==
=== Singles: 3 (2 titles, 1 runner-up) ===
Legend WTA 500 (2–0) WTA 250 (0–1)	Finals by surface Hard (2–1)	Finals by setting Outdoor (2–1)

Result	W–L	Date	Tournament	Tier	Surface	Opponent	Score
Win	1–0	Sep 2025	Guadalajara Open, Mexico	WTA 500	Hard	(Colombia) Emiliana Arango	6–4, 6–1
Loss	1–1	Jan 2026	Hobart International, Australia	WTA 250	Hard	(Italy) Elisabetta Cocciaretto	4–6, 4–6
Win	2–1	Sep 2026	Guadalajara Open, Mexico (2)	WTA 500	Hard	(United States) Peyton Stearns	6–4, 6–2

== WTA 125 finals ==
=== Singles: 1 (title) ===
Result	Date	Tournament	Surface	Opponent	Score
Win	Jun 2025	Ilkley Open, UK	Grass	(Canada) Rebecca Marino	6–1, 6–3

== Billie Jean King Cup participation ==
Jovic made her debut at the Billie Jean King Cup playing for United States in 2026. Since then, she has a singles record of 0–2.

Legend	Meaning
F QR / Z RR / Z PO (0–2)	Finals qualifying round / Zone Group round robin / play-off

=== Singles: 2 (losses) ===
Edition	Stage	Date	Location	Surface	Against	Opponent	W/L	Score
2026	F QR	Apr 2026	Ostend, Belgium	Clay (i)	Belgium	Hanne Vandewinkel	L	6–7^{(3–7)}, 3–6
2026	F QR	Apr 2026	Ostend, Belgium	Clay (i)	Belgium	Greet Minnen	L	5–7, 3–6

== ITF Circuit finals ==
=== Singles: 9 (4 titles, 5 runner-ups) ===
Legend W100 tournaments (1–1) W75 tournaments (1–1) W25/35 tournaments (2–2) W15 tournaments (0–1)	Finals by surface Hard (3–4) Clay (1–1)

Result	W–L	Date	Tournament	Tier	Surface	Opponent	Score
Loss	0–1	Jun 2022	ITF Los Angeles, US	W15	Hard	(United States) Eryn Cayetano	7–5, 4–6, 3–6
Win	1–1	Oct 2023	ITF Redding, US	W35	Hard	(Japan) Sayaka Ishii	6–4, 6–2
Loss	1–2	Feb 2024	ITF Spring, US	W35	Hard	(Japan) Ena Shibahara	2–6, 6–4, 3–6
Loss	1–3	May 2024	Florida's Sports Coast Open, US	W75	Clay	(United States) Akasha Urhobo	3–6, 1–6
Win	2–3	Sep 2024	Berkeley Challenge, US	W35	Hard	(Canada) Victoria Mboko	6–3, 2–6, 6–3
Win	3–3	Sep 2024	Rancho Santa Fe Open, US	W75	Hard	(Japan) Ena Shibahara	6–3, 6–3
Loss	3–4	Oct 2024	Tyler Pro Challenge, US	W100	Hard	(Mexico) Renata Zarazúa	4–6, 2–6
Loss	3–5	Feb 2025	Arcadia Pro Open, US	W35	Hard	(Canada) Kayla Cross	2–6, 6–7^{(6)}
Win	4–5	Apr 2025	Charlottesville Open, US	W100	Clay	(Romania) Irina Bara	6–0, 6–1

== Junior Grand Slam tournament finals ==
=== Doubles: 3 (2 titles, 1 runner-up) ===
Result	Year	Tournament	Surface	Partner	Opponents	Score
Win	2024	Australian Open	Hard	(United States) Tyra Caterina Grant	(Czech Republic) Julie Paštiková (Germany) Julia Stusek	6–3, 6–1
Loss	2024	French Open	Clay	(United States) Tyra Caterina Grant	(Slovakia) Renáta Jamrichová (Czech Republic) Tereza Valentová	4–6, 4–6
Win	2024	Wimbledon	Grass	(United States) Tyra Caterina Grant	(United Kingdom) Mika Stojsavljevic (United Kingdom) Mimi Xu	7–5, 4–6, [10–8]

== Best Grand Slam results details ==
=== Singles ===
Australian Open
2026 Australian Open (29th seed)
Round	Opponent	Rank	Score	IJR
1R	(United States) Katie Volynets	96	6–2, 6–3	27
2R	(Australia) Priscilla Hon (WC)	121	6–1, 6–2	27
3R	(Italy) Jasmine Paolini (7)	8	6–2, 7–6^{(7–3)}	27
4R	(Kazakhstan) Yulia Putintseva	94	6–0, 6–1	27
QF	Aryna Sabalenka (1)	1	3–6, 0–6	27

Wimbledon Championships
2026 Wimbledon (16th seed)
Round	Opponent	Rank	Score	IJR
1R	(Romania) Jaqueline Cristian	37	7–6^{(7–1)}, 6–0	16
2R	(Germany) Tatjana Maria	96	6–1, 6–2	16
3R	Ekaterina Alexandrova (18)	19	6–3, 3–6, 6–4	16
4R	(United States) Jessica Pegula (4)	4	6–4, 3–6, 1–6	16

French Open
2026 French Open (17th seed)
Round	Opponent	Rank	Score	IJR
1R	(Philippines) Alexandra Eala	37	6–4, 6–2	17
2R	(United States) Emma Navarro	25	6–0, 6–3	17
3R	(Japan) Naomi Osaka (16)	16	6–7^{(5–7)}, 7–6^{(7–3)}, 4–6	17

US Open
2026 US Open (14th seed)
Round	Opponent	Rank	Score	IJR
1R	(Poland) Magdalena Fręch	41	7–5, 6–3	14
2R	(United Kingdom) Francesca Jones (Q)	104	6–4, 6–4	14
3R	(Philippines) Alexandra Eala (17)	18	7–5, 3–6, 7–5	14
4R	(United States) Coco Gauff (4)	4	1–6, 4–6	14

== WTA Tour career earnings ==
Current through the 2026 WTA Finals.

Year	Grand Slam titles	WTA titles	Total titles	Earnings ($)	Money list rank
2022	0	0	0	1,617	1390
2023	0	0	0	4,817	1004
2024	0	0	0	194,866	208
2025	0	1	1	924,448	73
2026	0	1	1	2,763,233	16
Career	0	2	2	3,888,981	228

== Wins against top 10 players ==
- Jovic has a 2–10 (17%) record against players who were, at the time the match was played, ranked in the top 10.

Season	2026	Total
Wins	2	2

No.	Player	Rk	Event	Surface	Rd	Score	Rk	Years	Ref
1	(Italy) Jasmine Paolini	7	Australian Open, Australia	Hard	3R	6–2, 7–6^{(7–3)}	27	2026	
2	(United States) Amanda Anisimova	5	Queen's Club, United Kingdom	Grass	QF	6–2, 3–6, 6–3	19	2026	

- Key: (Rk) first use, opponent rank; (Rd) round; (Rk) 2nd use, player rank; (Ref) reference; (F) final; (SF) semifinal; (QF) quarterfinal; (#R) rounds 4, 3, 2, 1; (RR) round-robin stage; (Q#) qualifying rounds or stages (3), 2, 1.
