= 2022 Aberto da República =

Tennis tournament

- Date: 28 November–4 December 2022
- Edition: 2nd
- Category: ITF Women's World Tennis Tour
- Prize money: $60,000
- Surface: Clay
- Location: Rio de Janeiro, Brazil

Champions

Singles
- Iryna Shymanovich

Doubles
- (Brazil) Ingrid Gamarra Martins / (Portugal) Francisca Jorge
← 2021 ·	Aberto da República	· 2023 →

The 2022 Aberto da República was a professional tennis tournament played on outdoor clay courts. It was the second edition of the tournament which was part of the 2022 ITF Women's World Tennis Tour. It took place in Rio de Janeiro, Brazil between 28 November and 4 December 2022.

== Champions ==
=== Singles ===
- Iryna Shymanovich def. Irina Khromacheva, 6–2, 5–7, 6–4

=== Doubles ===
- (Brazil) Ingrid Gamarra Martins / (Portugal) Francisca Jorge def. (United States) Anna Rogers / (United States) Christina Rosca, 6–4, 6–3

== Singles main draw entrants ==
=== Seeds ===
Country	Player	Rank^{1}	Seed
HUN	Réka Luca Jani	110	1
BRA	Laura Pigossi	118	2
USA	Hailey Baptiste	176	3
~~TUR~~	~~İpek Öz~~	~~214~~	~~4~~
ESP	Rosa Vicens Mas	226	5
	Irina Khromacheva	239	6
BRA	Gabriela Cé	254	7
ARG	Julia Riera	270	8
ESP	Yvonne Cavallé Reimers	288	9

- ^{1} Rankings are as of 21 November 2022.

=== Other entrants ===
The following players received wildcards into the singles main draw:

- (Brazil) Ana Candiotto
- (Brazil) Gabriela Felix da Silva
- (Brazil) Maria Carolina Ferreira Turchetto
- (Brazil) Paola Ueno Dalmonico

The following players received entry from the qualifying draw:

- (Brazil) Bianca Bernardes
- (Brazil) Cecilia Costa
- (Brazil) Maria Luisa Oliveira
- (Brazil) Rebeca Pereira
- (Brazil) Luana Plaza Araújo
- (Peru) Francesca Maguiña Bunikowska
- (United States) Anna Rogers
- (United States) Christina Rosca
