= 2023 Palmetto Pro Open – Singles =

Singles
- 2023 Palmetto Pro Open

Final
- Champion: (Ukraine) Yulia Starodubtseva
- Runner-up: (India) Karman Thandi
- Score: 6–7^{(5–7)}, 7–5, 6–4

Events
Singles	Doubles
← 2022 ·	Palmetto Pro Open	· 2024 →

Sophie Chang was the defending champion but chose not to participate.

Yulia Starodubtseva won the title, defeating Karman Thandi in the final, 6–7^{(5–7)}, 7–5, 6–4.

== Seeds ==
1. (Canada) Stacey Fung (quarterfinals)
2. (India) Karman Thandi (final)
3. (United States) Liv Hovde (semifinals)
4. (United States) Ashley Lahey (second round)
5. (United States) Maria Mateas (semifinals)
6. (United States) Grace Min (quarterfinals)
7. (India) Rutuja Bhosale (first round, retired)
8. (Ukraine) Yulia Starodubtseva (champion)

== Draw ==
Key

- Q = Qualifier
- WC = Wild card
- LL = Lucky loser
- Alt = Alternate
- ITF = ITF entry
- PR = Protected ranking
- SR = Special ranking
- SE = Special exempt
- JE = Junior exempt
- JR = Junior Accelerator Programme entrant
- CO = College Accelerator Programme entrant
- NG = Next Gen Accelerator Program entrant
- w/o = Walkover
- r = Retired
- d = Defaulted

=== Finals ===
Semifinals
8	(Ukraine) Yulia Starodubtseva	6	4	6
3	(United States) Liv Hovde	3	6	3
5	(United States) Maria Mateas	5	3
2	(India) Karman Thandi	7	6

Final
8	(Ukraine) Yulia Starodubtseva	6^{5}	7	6
2	(India) Karman Thandi	7^{7}	5	4

=== Top half ===
First round
1	(Canada) S Fung	6	6
(Argentina) MS Krywoj	2	2
WC	(United States) V Osuigwe	7^{7}	6
(India) R Bhatia	6^{3}	1
(United States) M Kessler	6	6
Q	(Canada) L Sleeth	0	1
Q	(United States) M Stoiana	5	0
8	(Ukraine) Y Starodubtseva	7	6
3	(United States) L Hovde	6	6
(United States) R Kingsley	4	2
(United States) A Blokhina	6	6
M Kozyreva	2	2
Q	(United States) H Giavara	6	7
WC	(United States) K Shaffer	1	5
Q	(Slovakia) M Okáľová	6	3
7	(India) R Bhosale	1	0^{r}

Second round
1	(Canada) S Fung	6	6
WC	(United States) V Osuigwe	1	3
(United States) M Kessler	6	1	1
8	(Ukraine) Y Starodubtseva	1	6	6
3	(United States) L Hovde	6	3	6
(United States) A Blokhina	2	6	0
Q	(United States) H Giavara	6	6
Q	(Slovakia) M Okáľová	4	4

Quarterfinals
1	(Canada) S Fung	2	6^{4}
8	(Ukraine) Y Starodubtseva	6	7^{7}
3	(United States) L Hovde	6	6
Q	(United States) H Giavara	3	3

Semifinals
8	(Ukraine) Y Starodubtseva	6	4	6
3	(United States) L Hovde	3	6	3

=== Bottom half ===
First round
5	(United States) M Mateas	6	6
Q	(Mexico) S Alcaraz	1	0
Q	(United States) A Urhobo	6	6
(Chinese Taipei) C-y Hsu	1	2
(Serbia) K Jokić	1	0
(United States) V Hu	6	6
Q	(United States) A Markham	7^{8}	4	6^{2}
4/WC	(United States) A Lahey	6^{6}	6	7^{7}
6	(United States) G Min	6	6
Q	(United States) P Charney	4	1
(United States) J Daniel	2	5
WC	(United States) UM Arconada	6	7
(United States) S Crawford	7	2	3
V Miroshnichenko	5	6	6
(United States) R McAdoo	2	1
2	(India) K Thandi	6	6

Second round
5	(United States) M Mateas	6	4	6
Q	(United States) A Urhobo	1	6	0
(United States) V Hu	6	6
4/WC	(United States) A Lahey	3	0
6	(United States) G Min	1	6	6
WC	(United States) UM Arconada	6	1	3
V Miroshnichenko	3	6	5
2	(India) K Thandi	6	3	7

Quarterfinals
5	(United States) M Mateas	6	4	6
(United States) V Hu	1	6	3
6	(United States) G Min	2	6	2
2	(India) K Thandi	6	3	6

Semifinals
5	(United States) M Mateas	5	3
2	(India) K Thandi	7	6
