= 2023 Naples Women's World Tennis Tour – Singles =

Singles
- 2023 Naples Women's World Tennis Tour

Final
- Champion: (United States) Caroline Dolehide
- Runner-up: (Ukraine) Yulia Starodubtseva
- Score: 7–5, 7–5

Events
Singles	Doubles
← 2023 ·	Naples Women's World Tennis Tour	· 2024 →

Emma Navarro was the defending champion but chose not to participate.

Caroline Dolehide won the title, defeating Yulia Starodubtseva in the final, 7–5, 7–5.

== Seeds ==
1. (United States) Caroline Dolehide (champion)
2. (United States) Kayla Day (semifinals)
3. (Mexico) Marcela Zacarías (quarterfinals)
4. (Romania) Gabriela Lee (first round)
5. (United States) Jamie Loeb (first round)
6. (Brazil) Gabriela Cé (first round)
7. (Australia) Astra Sharma (quarterfinals)
8. (Mexico) Renata Zarazúa (quarterfinals)

== Draw ==
=== Key ===
- Q = Qualifier
- WC = Wild card
- LL = Lucky loser
- Alt = Alternate
- ITF = ITF entry
- PR = Protected ranking
- SR = Special ranking
- SE = Special exempt
- JE = Junior exempt
- JR = Junior Accelerator Programme entrant
- CO = College Accelerator Programme entrant
- NG = Next Gen Accelerator Program entrant
- w/o = Walkover
- r = Retired
- d = Defaulted

=== Finals ===
Semifinals
1	(United States) Caroline Dolehide	6	7
(United States) Sophie Chang	2	5
Q	(Ukraine) Yulia Starodubtseva	3	6	6
2	(United States) Kayla Day	6	2	1

Final
1	(United States) Caroline Dolehide	7	7
Q	(Ukraine) Yulia Starodubtseva	5	5

=== Top half ===
First round
1	(United States) C Dolehide	6	6
(Japan) Y Naito	2	1
(United States) W Osuigwe	5	2^{r}
Q	(United States) H Giavara	7	1
Q	(United States) V Osuigwe	0	6	6
(United States) T Ng	6	2	0
(Serbia) K Kozarov	2	1
8	(Mexico) R Zarazúa	6	6
4	(Romania) G Lee	5	0
(France) M Partaud	7	6
Q	(United States) M Kessler	2	7	6
WC	(United States) K Quevedo	6	5	2
D Kudashova	4	7	6
(United States) R Kingsley	6	5	1
(United States) S Chang	6	6
6	(Brazil) G Cé	2	1

Second round
1	(United States) C Dolehide	6	6
Q	(United States) H Giavara	1	4
Q	(United States) V Osuigwe	2	2
8	(Mexico) R Zarazúa	6	6
(France) M Partaud	6	6^{3}	4
Q	(United States) M Kessler	4	7^{7}	6
D Kudashova	2	6	4
(United States) S Chang	6	4	6

Quarterfinals
1	(United States) C Dolehide	7	6
8	(Mexico) R Zarazúa	5	1
Q	(United States) M Kessler	4	3
(United States) S Chang	6	6

Semifinals
1	(United States) C Dolehide	6	7
(United States) S Chang	2	5

=== Bottom half ===
First round
5	(United States) J Loeb	3	3
Q	(Ukraine) Y Starodubtseva	6	6
(Austria) T Paszek	7^{7}	6
SR	(United States) Q Gleason	6^{2}	1
Q	(United States) P Corley	3	1
Q	M Kononova	6	6
WC	(United States) S Cisse-Ignatiev	2	0
3	(Mexico) M Zacarías	6	6
7	(Australia) A Sharma	6	6
WC	(United States) A Urhobo	3	0
Q	(United States) K McKenzie	3	0^{r}
Q	(United States) J Daniel	6	4
WC	(China) M Zhou	3	2
(United States) C Rosca	6	6
(Bolivia) N Zeballos	0	1
2	(United States) K Day	6	6

Second round
Q	(Ukraine) Y Starodubtseva	6	6
(Austria) T Paszek	0	3
Q	M Kononova	3	1
3	(Mexico) M Zacarías	6	6
7	(Australia) A Sharma	6	6
Q	(United States) J Daniel	3	0
(United States) C Rosca	1	0
2	(United States) K Day	6	6

Quarterfinals
Q	(Ukraine) Y Starodubtseva	6	6
3	(Mexico) M Zacarías	1	2
7	(Australia) A Sharma	2	3
2	(United States) K Day	6	6

Semifinals
Q	(Ukraine) Y Starodubtseva	3	6	6
2	(United States) K Day	6	2	1
