= 2023 Aberto da República – Singles =

Singles
- 2023 Aberto da República

Final
- Champion: (Chile) Alejandro Tabilo
- Runner-up: (Argentina) Román Andrés Burruchaga
- Score: 6–3, 7–6^{(8–6)}

Events
Singles	Doubles
← 2021 ·	Aberto da República	· 2024 →

Federico Coria was the defending champion but chose not to defend his title.

Alejandro Tabilo won the title after defeating Román Andrés Burruchaga 6–3, 7–6^{(8–6)} in the final.

== Seeds ==
1. (Chile) Cristian Garín (quarterfinals)
2. (Chile) Tomás Barrios Vera (first round)
3. (Bolivia) Hugo Dellien (withdrew)
4. (United States) Aleksandar Kovacevic (first round)
5. (Argentina) Thiago Agustín Tirante (quarterfinals)
6. (Brazil) Thiago Monteiro (withdrew)
7. (United States) Nicolas Moreno de Alboran (second round)
8. (Argentina) Guido Andreozzi (first round)
9. (United States) Oliver Crawford (first round)

== Draw ==
=== Key ===
- Q = Qualifier
- WC = Wild card
- LL = Lucky loser
- Alt = Alternate
- SE = Special exempt
- PR = Protected ranking
- ITF = ITF entry
- JE = Junior exempt
- w/o = Walkover
- r = Retired
- d = Defaulted
- SR = Special ranking

=== Finals ===
Semifinals
(Argentina) Santiago Rodríguez Taverna	4	3
(Argentina) Román Andrés Burruchaga	6	6
Q	(Chile) Alejandro Tabilo	6	3	6
(Argentina) Juan Pablo Ficovich	4	6	2

Final
(Argentina) Román Andrés Burruchaga	3	6^{6}
Q	(Chile) Alejandro Tabilo	6	7^{8}

=== Top half ===
First round
1	(Chile) C Garín	6	6
Alt	(Brazil) O Luz	0	4
Q	(Peru) G Bueno	6^{2}	6^{7}
(Brazil) JL Reis da Silva	7^{7}	7^{9}
(Argentina) S Rodríguez Taverna	6	5	7
WC	(Brazil) E Ribeiro	4	7	5
(Brazil) M Pucinelli de Almeida	3	3
7	(United States) N Moreno de Alboran	6	6
4	(United States) A Kovacevic	3	6	6^{2}
WC	(Brazil) J Fonseca	6	3	7^{7}
(Argentina) H Casanova	6	5	1
(Argentina) RA Burruchaga	1	7	6
Alt	(Zimbabwe) B Lock	6^{4}	6^{5}
(Argentina) R Olivo	7^{7}	7^{7}
(United States) T Boyer	6	6
8	(Argentina) G Andreozzi	4	3

Second round
1	(Chile) C Garín	7	6
(Brazil) JL Reis da Silva	5	4
(Argentina) S Rodríguez Taverna	3	6	7^{7}
7	(United States) N Moreno de Alboran	6	4	6^{5}
WC	(Brazil) J Fonseca	6	4	4
(Argentina) RA Burruchaga	4	6	6
(Argentina) R Olivo	1	4
(United States) T Boyer	6	6

Quarterfinals
1	(Chile) C Garín	4	5
(Argentina) S Rodríguez Taverna	6	7
(Argentina) RA Burruchaga	7^{7}	6
(United States) T Boyer	6^{3}	1

Semifinals
(Argentina) S Rodríguez Taverna	4	3
(Argentina) RA Burruchaga	6	6

=== Bottom half ===
First round
LL	(Brazil) M Alves	7	6
Q	(Brazil) F Romboli	5	3
Q	(Chile) A Tabilo	6	7^{7}
Q	(Peru) I Buse	4	6^{5}
(Monaco) V Vacherot	6	6
LL	(Jamaica) B Bicknell	1	1
(Australia) B Tomic	6	6
9	(United States) O Crawford	3	2
5	(Argentina) TA Tirante	6	6
(Argentina) F Bagnis	2	4
Q	(Brazil) Wilson Leite	6^{4}	5
WC	(Brazil) Gilbert Klier Júnior	7^{7}	7
(Argentina) JP Ficovich	6	6
Q	(Brazil) P Sakamoto	1	2
(Brazil) G Heide	7^{9}	6
2	(Chile) T Barrios Vera	6^{7}	4

Second round
LL	(Brazil) M Alves	4	4
Q	(Chile) A Tabilo	6	6
(Monaco) V Vacherot	5	7	6^{6}
(Australia) B Tomic	7	5	7^{8}
5	(Argentina) TA Tirante	6	6
WC	(Brazil) G Klier Júnior	4	4
(Argentina) JP Ficovich	7^{7}	6
(Brazil) G Heide	6^{2}	3

Quarterfinals
Q	(Chile) A Tabilo	6	6^{4}	7^{11}
(Australia) B Tomic	4	7^{7}	6^{9}
5	(Argentina) TA Tirante	6	3	6^{1}
(Argentina) JP Ficovich	4	6	7^{7}

Semifinals
Q	(Chile) A Tabilo	6	3	6
(Argentina) JP Ficovich	4	6	2
