= 2023 Palmetto Pro Open – Doubles =

Doubles
- 2023 Palmetto Pro Open

Final
- Champions: (United States) Maria Mateas (United States) Anna Rogers
- Runners-up: (United States) McCartney Kessler (Ukraine) Yulia Starodubtseva
- Score: 6–4, 6–7^{(3–7)}, [10–6]

Events
Singles	Doubles
← 2022 ·	Palmetto Pro Open	· 2024 →

The 2023 Palmetto Pro Open was a professional tennis tournament played on outdoor hard courts that occurred 12–18 June 2023. Kylie Collins and Peyton Stearns were the defending champions for the doubles but chose not to participate. Maria Mateas and Anna Rogers won the title, defeating McCartney Kessler and Yulia Starodubtseva in the final, 6–4, 6–7^{(3–7)}, [10–6].

== Seeds ==
1. (United States) Maria Mateas / (United States) Anna Rogers (champions)
2. Maria Kozyreva / Veronika Miroshnichenko (semifinals)
3. (United States) Jaeda Daniel / (United States) Jada Hart (quarterfinals)
4. (India) Sowjanya Bavisetti / (India) Rutuja Bhosale (first round)

== Draw ==
Key

- Q = Qualifier
- WC = Wild card
- LL = Lucky loser
- Alt = Alternate
- ITF = ITF entry
- PR = Protected ranking
- SR = Special ranking
- SE = Special exempt
- JE = Junior exempt
- JR = Junior Accelerator Programme entrant
- CO = College Accelerator Programme entrant
- NG = Next Gen Accelerator Program entrant
- w/o = Walkover
- r = Retired
- d = Defaulted

First round
1	(United States) M Mateas (United States) A Rogers	6	7
(Chinese Taipei) C-y Hsu (United States) M Yamakita	4	5
WC	(United States) E Lella (United States) M Schaefbauer	0	1
(United States) K Pierre-Louis (Canada) L Sleeth	6	6
3	(United States) J Daniel (United States) J Hart	6	6
(United States) S Crawford (Serbia) K Jokić	2	4
(United States) R McAdoo (United States) V Osuigwe	4	6^{5}
(United States) V Hu (Argentina) MS Krywoj	6	7^{7}
(United States) M Kessler (Ukraine) Y Starodubtseva	6	6
(India) R Bhatia (United States) R Kingsley	3	2
(United States) A Blokhina (United States) H Giavara	6	6
4	(India) S Bavisetti (India) R Bhosale	4	2
(United States) A Lahey (United States) K Shaffer	7	7^{7}
(United States) A Markham (Slovakia) M Okáľová	5	6^{4}
(Brazil) C Bohrer Martins (United States) S Leon	0	3
2	M Kozyreva; V Miroshnichenko	6	6

Quarterfinals
1	(United States) M Mateas (United States) A Rogers	6	6
(United States) K Pierre-Louis (Canada) L Sleeth	3	2
3	(United States) J Daniel (United States) J Hart	5	4
(United States) V Hu (Argentina) MS Krywoj	7	6
(United States) M Kessler (Ukraine) Y Starodubtseva	6	6
(United States) A Blokhina (United States) H Giavara	2	3
(United States) A Lahey (United States) K Shaffer	4	1
2	M Kozyreva; V Miroshnichenko	6	6

Semifinals
1	(United States) M Mateas (United States) A Rogers	6	6
(United States) V Hu (Argentina) MS Krywoj	4	1
(United States) M Kessler (Ukraine) Y Starodubtseva	6	6
2	M Kozyreva; V Miroshnichenko	4	2

Final
1	(United States) M Mateas (United States) A Rogers	6	6^{3}	[10]
(United States) M Kessler (Ukraine) Y Starodubtseva	4	7^{7}	[6]
