= 2021 Aberto da República – Men's doubles =

Men's doubles
- 2021 Aberto da República

Final
- Champions: (Brazil) Mateus Alves (Brazil) Gustavo Heide
- Runners-up: (Italy) Luciano Darderi (Argentina) Genaro Alberto Olivieri
- Score: 6–3, 6–3

Events
| Singles | men | women |
| Doubles | men | women |
| Aberto da República | · 2023 → |

This was the first edition of the tournament.

Mateus Alves and Gustavo Heide won the title after defeating Luciano Darderi and Genaro Alberto Olivieri 6–3, 6–3 in the final.

== Seeds ==
1. (Brazil) Orlando Luz / (Brazil) Rafael Matos (semifinals)
2. (Venezuela) Luis David Martínez / (Brazil) Fernando Romboli (first round)
3. (United States) James Cerretani / (Switzerland) Luca Margaroli (first round)
4. (Netherlands) Mark Vervoort / (Bolivia) Federico Zeballos (first round)

== Draw ==
=== Key ===
- Q = Qualifier
- WC = Wild card
- LL = Lucky loser
- Alt = Alternate
- SE = Special exempt
- PR = Protected ranking
- ITF = ITF entry
- JE = Junior exempt
- w/o = Walkover
- r = Retired
- d = Defaulted
- SR = Special ranking

First round
1 | (Brazil) O Luz (Brazil) R Matos | 6 | 6
(Argentina) P Cachin (Argentina) F Cerúndolo | 4 | 2
Alt | (Spain) N Álvarez Varona (Argentina) F Díaz Acosta | 6 | 6
(Brazil) Gilbert Klier Júnior (Brazil) M Pucinelli de Almeida | 4 | 4
3 | (United States) J Cerretani (Switzerland) L Margaroli | 6 | 6^{3} | [3]
WC | (Brazil) M Alves (Brazil) G Heide | 4 | 7^{7} | [10]
(Brazil) F Meligeni Alves (Brazil) T Seyboth Wild | 7^{7} | 6^{5} | [6]
PR | (Argentina) JP Ficovich (Argentina) Matías Zukas | 6^{4} | 7^{7} | [10]
(Italy) L Darderi (Argentina) GA Olivieri | 7 | 6^{3} | [10]
(Colombia) A Gómez (Peru) A Merino | 5 | 7^{7} | [7]
(Switzerland) L Castelnuovo (Switzerland) J Nikles | 7 | 7
4 | (Netherlands) M Vervoort (Bolivia) F Zeballos | 5 | 5
Alt | (Slovenia) T Lipovšek Puches (Argentina) JI Londero | 3 | 6 | [11]
WC | (Brazil) Wilson Leite (Brazil) J Pereira | 6 | 3 | [9]
(Argentina) H Casanova (Argentina) S Rodríguez Taverna | 6^{5} | 6 | [14]
2 | (Venezuela) LD Martínez (Brazil) F Romboli | 7^{7} | 4 | [12]

Quarterfinals
1 | (Brazil) O Luz (Brazil) R Matos | w/o
Alt | (Spain) N Álvarez Varona (Argentina) F Díaz Acosta
WC | (Brazil) M Alves (Brazil) G Heide | 6 | 7^{7}
PR | (Argentina) JP Ficovich (Argentina) M Zukas | 2 | 6^{5}
(Italy) L Darderi (Argentina) GA Olivieri | 6 | 6
(Switzerland) L Castelnuovo (Switzerland) J Nikles | 3 | 2
Alt | (Slovenia) T Lipovšek Puches (Argentina) JI Londero | 4 | 3
(Argentina) H Casanova (Argentina) S Rodríguez Taverna | 6 | 6

Semifinals
1 | (Brazil) O Luz (Brazil) R Matos | 3 | 6 | [5]
WC | (Brazil) M Alves (Brazil) G Heide | 6 | 3 | [10]
(Italy) L Darderi (Argentina) GA Olivieri | 6 | 3 | [10]
(Argentina) H Casanova (Argentina) S Rodríguez Taverna | 3 | 6 | [7]

Final
WC | (Brazil) M Alves (Brazil) G Heide | 6 | 6
(Italy) L Darderi (Argentina) GA Olivieri | 3 | 3
