= 2024 Palmetto Pro Open – Doubles =

Doubles
- 2024 Palmetto Pro Open

Final
- Champions: (Spain) Alicia Herrero Liñana (Argentina) Melany Krywoj
- Runners-up: (United States) Sophie Chang (United States) Dalayna Hewitt
- Score: 6–3, 6–3

Events
Singles	Doubles
← 2023 ·	Palmetto Pro Open	· 2025 →

Maria Mateas and Anna Rogers were the defending champions but lost in the first round to Kayla Cross and Maribella Zamarripa.

Alicia Herrero Liñana and Melany Krywoj won the title, defeating Sophie Chang and Dalayna Hewitt in the final, 6–3, 6–3.

== Seeds ==
1. (United States) Sophie Chang / (United States) Dalayna Hewitt (final)
2. Maria Kononova / Maria Kozyreva (semifinals)
3. (United States) Maria Mateas / (United States) Anna Rogers (first round)
4. (United States) Jaeda Daniel / (United States) Haley Giavara (first round)

== Draw ==
=== Key ===
- Q = Qualifier
- WC = Wild card
- LL = Lucky loser
- Alt = Alternate
- SE = Special exempt
- PR = Protected ranking
- ITF = ITF entry
- JE = Junior exempt
- w/o = Walkover
- r = Retired
- d = Defaulted
- SR = Special ranking

First round
1	(United States) S Chang (United States) D Hewitt	6	1	[10]
(Japan) H Kuwata (Ukraine) K Volodko	2	6	[6]
(United States) A Bowers (United States) M Yamakita	6	5	[10]
WC	(United States) K Carnicella (United States) S Hamner	2	7	[12]
4	(United States) J Daniel (United States) H Giavara	6	2	[9]
(Canada) C Brace (United States) M Ngounoue	3	6	[11]
WC	(United States) S Broadus (United States) V Flores	2	4
(United States) R Anderson (Australia) A Bozovic	6	6
(Canada) C Branstine (Canada) S Fung	7	0	[8]
(Spain) A Herrero Liñana (Argentina) M Krywoj	5	6	[10]
(Canada) K Cross (United States) M Zamarripa	6	3	[10]
3	(United States) M Mateas (United States) A Rogers	1	6	[5]
(Japan) S Ishii (India) S Yamalapalli	3	3
(United States) J Failla (Hong Kong) C Wong	6	6
(United States) V Osuigwe (United States) W Osuigwe	6^{4}	6	[7]
2	M Kononova; M Kozyreva	7^{7}	4	[10]

Quarterfinals
1	(United States) S Chang (United States) D Hewitt	6	7^{7}
WC	(United States) K Carnicella (United States) S Hamner	1	6^{4}
(Canada) C Brace (United States) M Ngounoue	6	7
(United States) R Anderson (Australia) A Bozovic	4	5
(Spain) A Herrero Liñana (Argentina) M Krywoj	6	7^{7}
(Canada) K Cross (United States) M Zamarripa	4	6^{1}
(United States) J Failla (Hong Kong) C Wong	6	2	[8]
2	M Kononova; M Kozyreva	0	6	[10]

Semifinals
1	(United States) S Chang (United States) D Hewitt	w/o
(Canada) C Brace (United States) M Ngounoue
(Spain) A Herrero Liñana (Argentina) M Krywoj	6	6
2	M Kononova; M Kozyreva	4	0

Final
1	(United States) S Chang (United States) D Hewitt	3	3
(Spain) A Herrero Liñana (Argentina) M Krywoj	6	6
