= 2023 Aberto da República – Doubles =

Doubles
- 2023 Aberto da República

Final
- Champions: (Colombia) Nicolás Barrientos (Sweden) André Göransson
- Runners-up: (Brazil) Marcelo Demoliner (Brazil) Rafael Matos
- Score: 7–6^{(7–3)}, 4–6, [11–9]

Events
Singles	Doubles
← 2021 ·	Aberto da República	· 2024 →

Mateus Alves and Gustavo Heide were the defending champions but chose to defend their title with different partners. Alves partnered Gabriel Décamps but lost in the semifinals to Marcelo Demoliner and Rafael Matos. Heide partnered Gilbert Klier Júnior but retired from his first round match against Demoliner and Matos.

Nicolás Barrientos and André Göransson won the title after defeating Demoliner and Matos 7–6^{(7–3)}, 4–6, [11–9] in the final.

== Seeds ==
1. (Brazil) Marcelo Demoliner / (Brazil) Rafael Matos (final)
2. (Colombia) Nicolás Barrientos / (Sweden) André Göransson (champions)
3. (Argentina) Guido Andreozzi / (Argentina) Guillermo Durán (quarterfinals)
4. (Bolivia) Boris Arias / (Bolivia) Federico Zeballos (semifinals)

== Draw ==
=== Key ===
- Q = Qualifier
- WC = Wild card
- LL = Lucky loser
- Alt = Alternate
- SE = Special exempt
- PR = Protected ranking
- ITF = ITF entry
- JE = Junior exempt
- w/o = Walkover
- r = Retired
- d = Defaulted
- SR = Special ranking

First round
1	(Brazil) M Demoliner (Brazil) R Matos	0
WC	(Brazil) G Heide (Brazil) Gilbert Klier Júnior	0^{r}
(Brazil) F Romboli (Brazil) M Zormann	6	7^{8}
(United States) N Moreno de Alboran (Brazil) M Pucinelli de Almeida	2	6^{6}
3	(Argentina) G Andreozzi (Argentina) G Durán	7^{7}	7
(Brazil) JL Reis da Silva (Brazil) E Ribeiro	6^{4}	5
(Peru) A Huertas del Pino (Peru) C Huertas del Pino	5	4
WC	(Brazil) M Alves (Brazil) G Décamps	7	6
(Australia) A Taylor (Australia) B Tomic	3	4
(Brazil) O Luz (Mexico) MÁ Reyes-Varela	6	6
(Zimbabwe) B Lock (New Zealand) R Statham	4	7	[8]
4	(Bolivia) B Arias (Bolivia) F Zeballos	6	5	[10]
(Uruguay) I Carou (Argentina) TA Tirante	4	4
(Argentina) FA Gómez (Venezuela) LD Martínez	6	6
(Switzerland) L Margaroli (Argentina) S Rodríguez Taverna	5	3
2	(Colombia) N Barrientos (Sweden) A Göransson	7	6

Quarterfinals
1	(Brazil) M Demoliner (Brazil) R Matos	6	6
(Brazil) F Romboli (Brazil) M Zormann	4	4
3	(Argentina) G Andreozzi (Argentina) G Durán	6^{4}	6	[9]
WC	(Brazil) M Alves (Brazil) G Décamps	7^{7}	3	[11]
(Brazil) O Luz (Mexico) MÁ Reyes-Varela	6	2	[11]
4	(Bolivia) B Arias (Bolivia) F Zeballos	3	6	[13]
(Argentina) FA Gómez (Venezuela) LD Martínez	5	7^{7}	[6]
2	(Colombia) N Barrientos (Sweden) A Göransson	7	6^{1}	[10]

Semifinals
1	(Brazil) M Demoliner (Brazil) R Matos	6	6
WC	(Brazil) M Alves (Brazil) G Décamps	4	4
4	(Bolivia) B Arias (Bolivia) F Zeballos	1	4
2	(Colombia) N Barrientos (Sweden) A Göransson	6	6

Final
1	(Brazil) M Demoliner (Brazil) R Matos	6^{3}	6	[9]
2	(Colombia) N Barrientos (Sweden) A Göransson	7^{7}	4	[11]
