= 2024 Florida's Sports Coast Open =

Tennis tournament

- Date: 6–12 May 2024
- Edition: 2nd
- Category: ITF Women's World Tennis Tour
- Prize money: $60,000
- Surface: Clay / Outdoor
- Location: Zephyrhills, United States

Champions

Singles
- (United States) Akasha Urhobo

Doubles
- (Lithuania) Justina Mikulskytė / (United States) Christina Rosca
| ← 2023 · | Florida's Sports Coast Open | · 2025 → |

The 2024 Florida's Sports Coast Open was a professional tennis tournament played on outdoor clay courts. It was the second edition of the tournament, which was part of the 2024 ITF Women's World Tennis Tour. It took place in Zephyrhills, United States, between 6 and 12 May 2024.

== Champions ==
=== Singles ===
- (United States) Akasha Urhobo def. (United States) Iva Jovic, 6–3, 6–1

=== Doubles ===
- (Lithuania) Justina Mikulskytė / (United States) Christina Rosca def. (United States) Anna Rogers / (United States) Alana Smith, 6–4, 6–4

== Singles main draw entrants ==
=== Seeds ===
| Country | Player | Rank | Seed |
|---|---|---|---|
| USA | Kayla Day | 84 | 1 |
| ~~NZL~~ | ~~Lulu Sun~~ | ~~164~~ | ~~2~~ |
| USA | Ann Li | 165 | 3 |
| HUN | Tímea Babos | 180 | 4 |
| USA | Elvina Kalieva | 214 | 5 |
| LTU | Justina Mikulskytė | 219 | 6 |
| USA | Hanna Chang | 245 | 7 |
| CAN | Katherine Sebov | 250 | 8 |

- Rankings are as of 22 April 2024.

=== Other entrants ===
The following players received wildcards into the singles main draw:

- (Canada) Eugenie Bouchard
- (United States) Iva Jovic
- (United States) Allie Kiick
- (United States) Whitney Osuigwe

The following player received entry into the singles main draw using a special ranking:

- (United States) Usue Maitane Arconada

The following player received entry into the singles main draw as a special exempt:

- (Sweden) Kajsa Rinaldo Persson

The following players received entry from the qualifying draw:

- (United States) Sophie Chang
- (United States) Jaeda Daniel
- (United States) Victoria Flores
- (Bulgaria) Lia Karatancheva
- Maria Kozyreva
- (Argentina) Melany Krywoj
- (Slovakia) Martina Okáľová
- (United States) Akasha Urhobo

The following player received entry as a lucky loser:

- (United States) Maribella Zamarripa
