= 2022 Aberto da República – Doubles =

Doubles
- 2022 Aberto da República

Final
- Champions: (Brazil) Ingrid Gamarra Martins (Portugal) Francisca Jorge
- Runners-up: (United States) Anna Rogers (United States) Christina Rosca
- Score: 6–4, 6–3

Events
Singles	Doubles
← 2021 ·	Aberto da República

Carolina Alves and María Carlé were the defending champions but chose not to participate.

Ingrid Gamarra Martins and Francisca Jorge won the title, defeating Anna Rogers and Christina Rosca in the final, 6–4, 6–3.

== Seeds ==
1. Amina Anshba / (Ukraine) Valeriya Strakhova (semifinals)
2. (Brazil) Ingrid Gamarra Martins / (Portugal) Francisca Jorge (champions)
3. (United States) Anna Rogers / (United States) Christina Rosca (final)
4. (United States) Jessie Aney / (Colombia) María Herazo González (semifinals)

== Draw ==
=== Key ===
- Q = Qualifier
- WC = Wild card
- LL = Lucky loser
- Alt = Alternate
- SE = Special exempt
- PR = Protected ranking
- ITF = ITF entry
- JE = Junior exempt
- w/o = Walkover
- r = Retired
- d = Defaulted
- SR = Special ranking

=== Draw ===
First round
1	A Anshba (Ukraine) V Strakhova	7^{7}	4	[10]
(United States) H Baptiste (United States) W Osuigwe	6^{2}	6	[7]
(Brazil) TG Pedretti (Bolivia) N Zeballos	5	2
(Spain) Y Cavallé Reimers (Spain) R Vicens Mas	7	6
3	(United States) A Rogers (United States) C Rosca	6	6
WC	(Brazil) H Bueno (Brazil) N Ferreira	1	1
I Khromacheva; I Shymanovich	6	6
WC	(Brazil) G Felix da Silva (Brazil) ML Oliveira	1	2
(Brazil) L Plaza Araújo (United States) T Tirunelveli	5	0
(Brazil) A Candiotto (Brazil) R Pereira	7	6
(Brazil) MC Ferreira Turchetto (Brazil) S Rodrigues de Lima	1	2
4	(United States) J Aney (Colombia) M Herazo González	6	6
WC	(Brazil) C Costa (Brazil) P Ueno Dalmonico	0	1
(Argentina) M Capurro Taborda (Argentina) J Riera	6	6
(Argentina) B Bonardi (Brazil) J Konishi Camargo Silva	5	0
2	(Brazil) I Gamarra Martins (Portugal) F Jorge	7	6

Quarterfinals
1	A Anshba (Ukraine) V Strakhova	6	3	[10]
(Spain) Y Cavallé Reimers (Spain) R Vicens Mas	3	6	[6]
3	(United States) A Rogers (United States) C Rosca	6	0
I Khromacheva; I Shymanovich	4	0^{r}
(Brazil) A Candiotto (Brazil) R Pereira	6	4	[5]
4	(United States) J Aney (Colombia) M Herazo González	2	6	[10]
(Argentina) M Capurro Taborda (Argentina) J Riera	2	1
2	(Brazil) I Gamarra Martins (Portugal) F Jorge	6	6

Semifinals
1	A Anshba (Ukraine) V Strakhova	6^{3}	6^{5}
3	(United States) A Rogers (United States) C Rosca	7^{7}	7^{7}
4	(United States) J Aney (Colombia) M Herazo González	6^{2}	0
2	(Brazil) I Gamarra Martins (Portugal) F Jorge	7^{7}	6

Final
3	(United States) A Rogers (United States) C Rosca	4	3
2	(Brazil) I Gamarra Martins (Portugal) F Jorge	6	6
