= 2021 Aberto da República – Men's singles =

Men's singles
- 2021 Aberto da República

Final
- Champion: (Argentina) Federico Coria
- Runner-up: (Spain) Jaume Munar
- Score: 7–5, 6–3

Events
Singles	men	women
Doubles	men	women
Aberto da República	· 2023 →

This was the first edition of the tournament.

Federico Coria won the title after defeating Jaume Munar 7–5, 6–3 in the final.

== Seeds ==
1. (Argentina) Federico Coria (champion)
2. (Spain) Jaume Munar (final)
3. (Argentina) Sebastián Báez (withdrew)
4. (Argentina) Francisco Cerúndolo (semifinals, retired)
5. (Bolivia) Hugo Dellien (second round)
6. (Argentina) Tomás Martín Etcheverry (first round)
7. (Brazil) Thiago Seyboth Wild (quarterfinals)
8. (Argentina) Juan Ignacio Londero (quarterfinals)

== Draw ==
=== Key ===
- Q = Qualifier
- WC = Wild card
- LL = Lucky loser
- Alt = Alternate
- SE = Special exempt
- PR = Protected ranking
- ITF = ITF entry
- JE = Junior exempt
- w/o = Walkover
- r = Retired
- d = Defaulted
- SR = Special ranking

=== Finals ===
Semifinals
1	(Argentina) Federico Coria	6	2
4	(Argentina) Francisco Cerúndolo	1	1^{r}
(Argentina) Pedro Cachin	3	7^{7}	3
2	(Spain) Jaume Munar	6	6^{2}	6

Final
1	(Argentina) Federico Coria	7	6
2	(Spain) Jaume Munar	5	3

=== Top half ===
First round
1	(Argentina) F Coria	6	7^{9}
Q	(Italy) L Darderi	3	6^{7}
WC	(Brazil) Wilson Leite	6	6
(Argentina) A Collarini	4	4
(Brazil) F Meligeni Alves	4	6	2
(Brazil) P Sakamoto	6	3	0^{r}
(Switzerland) J Nikles	4	4
8	(Argentina) JI Londero	6	6
4	(Argentina) F Cerúndolo	6	6
LL	(Brazil) J Pereira	2	1
(Argentina) GA Olivieri	2	6	6
(Brazil) M Pucinelli de Almeida	6	2	4
WC	(Brazil) G Heide	7	1	5
(Argentina) H Casanova	5	6	7
(Chile) N Jarry	3	6	5
5	(Bolivia) H Dellien	6	3	7

Second round
1	(Argentina) F Coria	6	7^{7}
WC	(Brazil) W Leite	4	6^{5}
(Brazil) F Meligeni Alves	4	6^{6}
8	(Argentina) JI Londero	6	7^{8}
4	(Argentina) F Cerúndolo	5	6	6
(Argentina) GA Olivieri	7	3	4
(Argentina) H Casanova	6	6
5	(Bolivia) H Dellien	4	4

Quarterfinals
1	(Argentina) F Coria	7^{12}	6
8	(Argentina) JI Londero	6^{10}	4
4	(Argentina) F Cerúndolo	7^{7}	6
(Argentina) H Casanova	6^{3}	4

Semifinals
1	(Argentina) F Coria	6	2
4	(Argentina) F Cerúndolo	1	1^{r}

=== Bottom half ===
First round
6	(Argentina) TM Etcheverry	6	6^{4}	4
(Argentina) N Kicker	4	7^{7}	6
(Argentina) JP Ficovich	6	3
(Brazil) O Luz	4	0^{r}
(Argentina) P Cachin	7	7
WC	(Brazil) M Alves	5	5
(Brazil) Gilbert Klier Júnior	6	7^{7}
Q	(Colombia) A Gómez	3	6^{4}
7	(Brazil) T Seyboth Wild	7^{7}	6
(Argentina) F Díaz Acosta	6^{1}	3
Q	(Russia) B Bobrov	3	6^{3}
(Spain) N Álvarez Varona	6	7^{7}
Q	(Slovenia) T Lipovšek Puches	1	0
(Argentina) S Rodríguez Taverna	6	6
Alt	(Colombia) A González	2	6	3
2	(Spain) J Munar	6	3	6

Second round
(Argentina) N Kicker	7^{7}	7^{8}
(Argentina) JP Ficovich	6^{5}	6^{6}
(Argentina) P Cachin	3	6	7^{7}
(Brazil) G Klier Júnior	6	3	6^{5}
7	(Brazil) T Seyboth Wild	7^{7}	5	4
(Spain) N Álvarez Varona	6^{4}	7	2^{r}
(Argentina) S Rodríguez Taverna	6	2	1
2	(Spain) J Munar	4	6	6

Quarterfinals
(Argentina) N Kicker	6^{3}	4
(Argentina) P Cachin	7^{7}	6
7	(Brazil) T Seyboth Wild	1	6	4
2	(Spain) J Munar	6	3	6

Semifinals
(Argentina) P Cachin	3	7^{7}	3
2	(Spain) J Munar	6	6^{2}	6
