= 2022 Aberto da República – Singles =

Singles
- 2022 Aberto da República

Final
- Champion: Iryna Shymanovich
- Runner-up: Irina Khromacheva
- Score: 6–2, 5–7, 6–4

Events
Singles	Doubles
← 2021 ·	Aberto da República

Panna Udvardy was the defending champion but chose not to participate.

Iryna Shymanovich won the title, defeating Irina Khromacheva in the final, 6–2, 5–7, 6–4.

== Seeds ==
1. (Hungary) Réka Luca Jani (quarterfinals)
2. (Brazil) Laura Pigossi (semifinals)
3. (United States) Hailey Baptiste (quarterfinals)
4. (Turkey) İpek Öz (withdrew)
5. (Spain) Rosa Vicens Mas (first round)
6. Irina Khromacheva (final)
7. (Brazil) Gabriela Cé (first round)
8. (Argentina) Julia Riera (first round)
9. (Spain) Yvonne Cavallé Reimers (quarterfinals)

== Draw ==
=== Key ===
- Q = Qualifier
- WC = Wild card
- LL = Lucky loser
- Alt = Alternate
- SE = Special exempt
- PR = Protected ranking
- ITF = ITF entry
- JE = Junior exempt
- w/o = Walkover
- r = Retired
- d = Defaulted
- SR = Special ranking

=== Finals ===
Semifinals
Amina Anshba	2	6	4
6	Irina Khromacheva	6	2	6
Iryna Shymanovich	7^{7}	4	6
2	(Brazil) Laura Pigossi	6^{4}	6	2

Final
6	Irina Khromacheva	2	7	4
Iryna Shymanovich	6	5	6

=== Top half ===
First round
1	(Hungary) RL Jani	6	6
Q	(United States) A Rogers	3	3
WC	(Brazil) G Felix da Silva	0	0
(Bolivia) N Zeballos	6	6
Q	(Brazil) C Costa	0	1
(Colombia) M Herazo González	6	6
A Anshba	6^{3}	6	6
7	(Brazil) G Cé	7^{7}	2	2
3	(United States) H Baptiste	6	6
Q	(Brazil) B Bernardes	0	0
(Argentina) M Capurro Taborda	6	6
Q	(Peru) F Maguiña Bunikowska	1	1
(China) X You	6	6
(Brazil) TG Pedretti	3	2
(Mexico) AS Sánchez	2	0^{r}
6	I Khromacheva	6	4

Second round
1	(Hungary) RL Jani	7^{11}	6
(Bolivia) N Zeballos	6^{9}	2
(Colombia) M Herazo González	7^{7}	2	6^{4}
A Anshba	6^{5}	6	7^{7}
3	(United States) H Baptiste	7	6
(Argentina) M Capurro Taborda	5	4
(China) X You	0	2
6	I Khromacheva	6	6

Quarterfinals
1	(Hungary) RL Jani	5	2
A Anshba	7	6
3	(United States) H Baptiste	6	4	1
6	I Khromacheva	4	6	6

Semifinals
A Anshba	2	6	4
6	I Khromacheva	6	2	6

=== Bottom half ===
First round
5	(Spain) R Vicens Mas	3	3
I Shymanovich	6	6
(Portugal) F Jorge	6	6
Q	(United States) C Rosca	0	1
(United States) J Aney	6	6
Q	(Brazil) L Plaza Araújo	1	0
WC	(Brazil) A Candiotto	2	2
9	(Spain) Y Cavallé Reimers	6	6
8	(Argentina) J Riera	7^{7}	2	5
(United States) W Osuigwe	6^{4}	6	7
WC	(Brazil) MC Ferreira Turchetto	1	2
(Ukraine) V Strakhova	6	6
Q	(Brazil) R Pereira	6	3	0
WC	(Brazil) P Ueno Dalmonico	3	6	6
Q	(Brazil) ML Oliveira	0	1
2	(Brazil) L Pigossi	6	6

Second round
I Shymanovich	5	6	6
(Portugal) F Jorge	7	4	3
(United States) J Aney	6^{3}	1
9	(Spain) Y Cavallé Reimers	7^{7}	6
(United States) W Osuigwe	6	6
(Ukraine) V Strakhova	1	2
WC	(Brazil) P Ueno Dalmonico	1	0
2	(Brazil) L Pigossi	6	6

Quarterfinals
I Shymanovich	6	6
9	(Spain) Y Cavallé Reimers	1	3
(United States) W Osuigwe	7^{7}	1	2
2	(Brazil) L Pigossi	6^{1}	6	6

Semifinals
I Shymanovich	7^{7}	4	6
2	(Brazil) L Pigossi	6^{4}	6	2
