= 2021 Aberto da República – Women's doubles =

Women's doubles
- 2021 Aberto da República

Final
- Champions: (Brazil) Carolina Alves (Argentina) María Lourdes Carlé
- Runners-up: (Ukraine) Valeriya Strakhova (Australia) Olivia Tjandramulia
- Score: 6–2, 6–1

Events
| Singles | men | women |
| Doubles | men | women |
| Aberto da República | · 2022 → |

This was the first edition of the tournament.

Carolina Alves and María Lourdes Carlé won the title, defeating Valeriya Strakhova and Olivia Tjandramulia in the final, 6–2, 6–1.

== Seeds ==
1. (Ukraine) Valeriya Strakhova / (Australia) Olivia Tjandramulia (final)
2. (Brazil) Carolina Alves / (Argentina) María Lourdes Carlé (champions)
3. (Chile) Bárbara Gatica / (Brazil) Rebeca Pereira (first round)
4. (United States) Dasha Ivanova / (Romania) Gabriela Lee (semifinals)

== Draw ==
=== Key ===
- Q = Qualifier
- WC = Wild card
- LL = Lucky loser
- Alt = Alternate
- SE = Special exempt
- PR = Protected ranking
- ITF = ITF entry
- JE = Junior exempt
- w/o = Walkover
- r = Retired
- d = Defaulted
- SR = Special ranking

=== Draw ===
First round
1 | (Ukraine) V Strakhova (Australia) O Tjandramulia | 6 | 6
(Argentina) M Capurro Taborda (Mexico) AS Sánchez | 3 | 2
(Estonia) ML Kaul (United States) S León | 7^{8} | 6
(Germany) J Jebawy (Italy) M Tona | 6^{6} | 4
3 | (Chile) B Gatica (Brazil) R Pereira | 1 | 6 | [8]
(Brazil) I Gamarra Martins (Brazil) TG Pedretti | 6 | 3 | [10]
(Brazil) N Kurata (Germany) E Welker | 6 | 5 | [10]
(Netherlands) M Hoedt (Germany) L Meyer auf der Heide | 1 | 7 | [8]
(Serbia) K Jokić (United States) C Van Nguyen | 1 | 7 | [5]
(Paraguay) L Escauriza (Bolivia) N Zeballos | 6 | 5 | [10]
WC | (Brazil) A Candiotto (Brazil) J Munhoz | 1 | 1
4 | (United States) D Ivanova (Romania) G Lee | 6 | 6
WC | (Brazil) L Cézar (Brazil) M Duarte | 0 | 2
(Brazil) S da Cruz Mendonça (Brazil) J Klimovicz | 6 | 6
WC | (Brazil) ML Oliveira (Brazil) J Rocha de Macedo Moraes | 3 | 1
2 | (Brazil) C Alves (Argentina) ML Carlé | 6 | 6

Quarterfinals
1 | (Ukraine) V Strakhova (Australia) O Tjandramulia | 6 | 6
(Estonia) ML Kaul (United States) S León | 0 | 2
(Brazil) I Gamarra Martins (Brazil) TG Pedretti | 6 | 6
(Brazil) N Kurata (Germany) E Welker | 3 | 4
(Paraguay) L Escauriza (Bolivia) N Zeballos | 1 | 0
4 | (United States) D Ivanova (Romania) G Lee | 6 | 6
(Brazil) S da Cruz Mendonça (Brazil) J Klimovicz | 1 | 1
2 | (Brazil) C Alves (Argentina) ML Carlé | 6 | 6

Semifinals
1 | (Ukraine) V Strakhova (Australia) O Tjandramulia | 7 | 6
(Brazil) I Gamarra Martins (Brazil) TG Pedretti | 5 | 0
4 | (United States) D Ivanova (Romania) G Lee | 4 | 4
2 | (Brazil) C Alves (Argentina) ML Carlé | 6 | 6

Final
1 | (Ukraine) V Strakhova (Australia) O Tjandramulia | 2 | 1
2 | (Brazil) C Alves (Argentina) ML Carlé | 6 | 6
