= 2024 Florida's Sports Coast Open – Singles =

Singles
- 2024 Florida's Sports Coast Open

Final
- Champion: (United States) Akasha Urhobo
- Runner-up: (United States) Iva Jovic
- Score: 6–3, 6–1

Events
Singles	Doubles
← 2023 ·	Florida's Sports Coast Open	· 2025 →

Makenna Jones was the defending champion but chose not to participate.

Akasha Urhobo won the title, defeating Iva Jovic in the final, 6–3, 6–1.

== Seeds ==
1. (United States) Kayla Day (semifinals)
2. (New Zealand) Lulu Sun (withdrew)
3. (United States) Ann Li (quarterfinals)
4. (Hungary) Tímea Babos (quarterfinals)
5. (United States) Elvina Kalieva (first round)
6. (Lithuania) Justina Mikulskytė (first round)
7. (United States) Hanna Chang (semifinals, retired)
8. (Canada) Katherine Sebov (first round)

== Draw ==
=== Key ===
- Q = Qualifier
- WC = Wild card
- LL = Lucky loser
- Alt = Alternate
- SE = Special exempt
- PR = Protected ranking
- ITF = ITF entry
- JE = Junior exempt
- w/o = Walkover
- r = Retired
- d = Defaulted
- SR = Special ranking

=== Finals ===
Semifinals
1	(United States) Kayla Day	2	3
WC	(United States) Iva Jovic	6	6
Q	(United States) Akasha Urhobo	6	0
7	(United States) Hanna Chang	4	0^{r}

Final
WC	(United States) Iva Jovic	3	1
Q	(United States) Akasha Urhobo	6	6

=== Top half ===
First round
1	(United States) K Day	6	6
(United States) R Anderson	4	4
LL	(United States) M Zamarripa	4	3
SE	(Sweden) K Rinaldo Persson	6	6
(Hungary) F Stollár	7	6
(Australia) M Joint	5	2
WC	(Canada) E Bouchard	6	6
6	(Lithuania) J Mikulskytė	1	2
4	(Hungary) T Babos	3
WC	(United States) A Kiick	0^{r}
Q	(United States) S Chang	3	7^{7}	6
SR	(United States) UM Arconada	6	6^{2}	2
(United States) J Loeb	6	2	4
WC	(United States) I Jovic	3	6	6
(United States) V Hu	7^{7}	6
8	(Canada) K Sebov	6^{3}	4

Second round
1	(United States) K Day	6	7^{7}
SE	(Sweden) K Rinaldo Persson	1	6^{4}
(Hungary) F Stollár	1	6	4
WC	(Canada) E Bouchard	6	2	6
4	(Hungary) T Babos	6	6
Q	(United States) S Chang	3	4
WC	(United States) I Jovic	6	6
(United States) V Hu	2	2

Quarterfinals
1	(United States) K Day	6^{4}	7	0
WC	(Canada) E Bouchard	7^{7}	5	0^{r}
4	(Hungary) T Babos	5	4
WC	(United States) I Jovic	7	6

Semifinals
1	(United States) K Day	2	3
WC	(United States) I Jovic	6	6

=== Bottom half ===
First round
5	(United States) E Kalieva	1	1
Q	(United States) A Urhobo	6	6
Q	(Slovakia) M Okáľová	6	7^{8}
(India) S Yamalapalli	3	6^{6}
Q	M Kozyreva	5	4
WC	(United States) W Osuigwe	7	6
(Switzerland) L Küng	5	6	1
3	(United States) A Li	7	4	6
7	(United States) H Chang	6	6
Q	(United States) J Daniel	3	2
Q	(Bulgaria) L Karatancheva	7^{7}	6
(United States) L Hovde	6^{4}	2
Q	(United States) V Flores	3	1^{r}
(Liechtenstein) K von Deichmann	6	4
(United States) M Mateas	6	6
Q	(Argentina) M Krywoj	2	3

Second round
Q	(United States) A Urhobo	6	4	6
Q	(Slovakia) M Okáľová	2	6	4
WC	(United States) W Osuigwe	4	2
3	(United States) A Li	6	6
7	(United States) H Chang	5	6	6
Q	(Bulgaria) L Karatancheva	7	4	1
(Liechtenstein) K von Deichmann	3	1
(United States) M Mateas	6	6

Quarterfinals
Q	(United States) A Urhobo	3	7^{7}	6
3	(United States) A Li	6	6^{3}	4
7	(United States) H Chang	6	0	7
(United States) M Mateas	4	6	5

Semifinals
Q	(United States) A Urhobo	6	0
7	(United States) H Chang	4	0^{r}
