= 2021 Aberto da República – Women's singles =

Women's singles
- 2021 Aberto da República

Final
- Champion: (Hungary) Panna Udvardy
- Runner-up: (Russia) Elina Avanesyan
- Score: 0–6, 6–4, 6–3

Events
Singles	men	women
Doubles	men	women
Aberto da República	· 2022 →

This was the first edition of the tournament.

Panna Udvardy won the title, defeating Elina Avanesyan in the final, 0–6, 6–4, 6–3.

== Seeds ==
1. (Hungary) Panna Udvardy (champion)
2. (Paraguay) Verónica Cepede Royg (semifinals)
3. (Brazil) Laura Pigossi (withdrew)
4. (Romania) Gabriela Lee (semifinals)
5. (Brazil) Carolina Alves (quarterfinals)
6. (Russia) Elina Avanesyan (final)
7. (Argentina) María Lourdes Carlé (second round)
8. (China) You Xiaodi (quarterfinals)

== Draw ==
=== Key ===
- Q = Qualifier
- WC = Wild card
- LL = Lucky loser
- Alt = Alternate
- SE = Special exempt
- PR = Protected ranking
- ITF = ITF entry
- JE = Junior exempt
- w/o = Walkover
- r = Retired
- d = Defaulted
- SR = Special ranking

=== Finals ===
Semifinals
1	(Hungary) Panna Udvardy	6	6
4	(Romania) Gabriela Lee	0	3
6	(Russia) Elina Avanesyan	6	6
2	(Paraguay) Verónica Cepede Royg	2	3

Final
1	(Hungary) Panna Udvardy	0	6	6
6	(Russia) Elina Avanesyan	6	4	3

=== Top half ===
First round
1	(Hungary) P Udvardy	6	6
Q	(Netherlands) M Hoedt	3	4
Q	(Germany) J Jebawy	2	6^{3}
(Ukraine) V Strakhova	6	7^{7}
PR	(Brazil) TG Pedretti	6	6
WC	(Brazil) J Klimovicz	2	2
WC	(Brazil) A Candiotto	1	1
8	(China) X You	6	6
4	(Romania) G Lee	6	6
Q	(Paraguay) L Escauriza	1	4
PR	(Australia) O Tjandramulia	6	6
Q	(United States) S León	3	0
(Canada) C Zhao	2	6	6
(United States) C Van Nguyen	6	1	1
WC	(Brazil) ML Oliveira	0	1
7	(Argentina) ML Carlé	6	6

Second round
1	(Hungary) P Udvardy	7	6
(Ukraine) V Strakhova	5	2
PR	(Brazil) TG Pedretti	5	1
8	(China) X You	7	6
4	(Romania) G Lee	7^{8}	6
PR	(Australia) O Tjandramulia	6^{6}	0
(Canada) C Zhao	6	4	6
7	(Argentina) ML Carlé	0	6	2

Quarterfinals
1	(Hungary) P Udvardy	6	6
8	(China) X You	2	0
4	(Romania) G Lee	5	7^{11}	7
(Canada) C Zhao	7	6^{9}	5

Semifinals
1	(Hungary) P Udvardy	6	6
4	(Romania) G Lee	0	3

=== Bottom half ===
First round
6	(Russia) E Avanesyan	2	6	6
(Brazil) I Gamarra Martins	6	0	4
Q	(Germany) L Meyer auf der Heide	6	7
(Brazil) N Kurata	2	5
LL	(Bolivia) N Zeballos	6	5	6
(United States) D Ivanova	2	7	3
(Mexico) AS Sánchez	2	4
LL	(Estonia) ML Kaul	6	6
5	(Brazil) C Alves	3	6	0
(India) R Bhatia	6	2	0^{r}
(Chile) B Gatica	6	6^{5}	6^{9}
Q	(Serbia) K Jokić	2	7^{7}	7^{11}
Q	(Argentina) M Capurro Taborda	3	6	6
Q	(Germany) E Welker	6	3	3
WC	(Brazil) S da Cruz Mendonça	0	3
2	(Paraguay) V Cepede Royg	6	6

Second round
6	(Russia) E Avanesyan	4	6	6
Q	(Germany) L Meyer auf der Heide	6	2	1
LL	(Bolivia) N Zeballos	0	4
LL	(Estonia) ML Kaul	6	6
5	(Brazil) C Alves	7	0	6
Q	(Serbia) K Jokić	5	6	3
Q	(Argentina) M Capurro Taborda	1	1
2	(Paraguay) V Cepede Royg	6	6

Quarterfinals
6	(Russia) E Avanesyan	7	6
LL	(Estonia) ML Kaul	5	4
5	(Brazil) C Alves	3	1
2	(Paraguay) V Cepede Royg	6	6

Semifinals
6	(Russia) E Avanesyan	6	6
2	(Paraguay) V Cepede Royg	2	3
