= 2023 Aberto da República =

- Date: 20–26 November
- Edition: 2nd
- Category: ATP Challenger Tour
- Surface: Hard
- Location: Brasília, Brazil

Champions

Singles
- (Chile) Alejandro Tabilo

Doubles
- (Colombia) Nicolás Barrientos / (Sweden) André Göransson
← 2021 ·	Aberto da República	· 2024 →

The 2023 Aberto da República was a professional tennis tournament played on outdoor hard courts. It was the second edition of the tournament which was part of the 2023 ATP Challenger Tour. It took place in Brasília, Brazil between 20 and 26 November 2023.

== Singles main-draw entrants ==
=== Seeds ===
Country	Player	Rank^{1}	Seed
CHI	Cristian Garín	88	1
CHI	Tomás Barrios Vera	106	2
~~BOL~~	~~Hugo Dellien~~	~~112~~	~~3~~
USA	Aleksandar Kovacevic	117	4
ARG	Thiago Agustín Tirante	121	5
~~BRA~~	~~Thiago Monteiro~~	~~131~~	~~6~~
USA	Nicolas Moreno de Alboran	153	7
ARG	Guido Andreozzi	180	8
USA	Oliver Crawford	193	9

- ^{1} Rankings are as of 13 November 2023.

=== Other entrants ===
The following players received wildcards into the singles main draw:

- (Brazil) João Fonseca
- (Brazil) Gilbert Klier Júnior
- (Brazil) Eduardo Ribeiro

The following players received entry into the singles main draw as alternates:

- (Zimbabwe) Benjamin Lock
- (Brazil) Orlando Luz

The following players received entry from the qualifying draw:

- (Peru) Gonzalo Bueno
- (Peru) Ignacio Buse
- (Brazil) Wilson Leite
- (Brazil) Fernando Romboli
- (Brazil) Pedro Sakamoto
- (Chile) Alejandro Tabilo

The following players received entry as lucky losers:

- (Brazil) Mateus Alves
- (Jamaica) Blaise Bicknell

== Champions ==
=== Singles ===
- (Chile) Alejandro Tabilo def. (Argentina) Román Andrés Burruchaga 6–3, 7–6^{(8–6)}.

=== Doubles ===
- (Colombia) Nicolás Barrientos / (Sweden) André Göransson def. (Brazil) Marcelo Demoliner / (Brazil) Rafael Matos 7–6^{(7–3)}, 4–6, [11–9].
