= Florida's Sports Coast Open =

- 2024 Florida's Sports Coast Open

ITF Women's Tour
- Event name: Florida's Sports Coast Open
- Location: Zephyrhills, Florida, United States
- Venue: Sarah Vande Berg Tennis and Wellness Center
- Category: ITF Women's World Tennis Tour
- Surface: Clay
- Draw: 32S/32Q/16D
- Prize money: $60,000

The Florida's Sports Coast Open is a tournament for professional female tennis players played on outdoor clay courts. The event is classified as a $60,000 ITF Women's World Tennis Tour tournament and has been held in Zephyrhills, Florida, United States, since 2023.

== Past finals ==
=== Singles ===
Year	Champion	Runner-up	Score
2026	(United States) Akasha Urhobo	(Spain) Ángela Fita Boluda	7–5, 6–4
2025	Iryna Shymanovich	(United States) Caty McNally	7–6^{(2)}, 6–0
2024	(United States) Akasha Urhobo	(United States) Iva Jovic	6–3, 6–1
2023	(United States) Makenna Jones	(United States) Hanna Chang	5–7, 6–4, 6–1

=== Doubles ===
Year	Champions	Runners-up	Score
2026	(United States) Savannah Broadus (United States) Hibah Shaikh	Daria Egorova; Anastasia Tikhonova	6–3, 5–7, [10–5]
2025	Maria Kozyreva; Iryna Shymanovich	(United States) Maria Mateas (United States) Alana Smith	6–4, 6–1
2024	(Lithuania) Justina Mikulskytė (United States) Christina Rosca	(United States) Anna Rogers (United States) Alana Smith	6–4, 6–4
2023	Maria Kononova (Ukraine) Yulia Starodubtseva	(United States) Jada Hart (United States) Rasheeda McAdoo	7–5, 6–3
