= Naples Women's World Tennis Tour =

- 2023 Naples Women's World Tennis Tour

ITF Women's Tour
- Event name: Naples Women's World Tennis Tour; ASC Women's Open (2016–21)
- Location: Naples, Florida, United States
- Venue: Emilio Sánchez Academy
- Category: ITF Women's World Tennis Tour
- Surface: Clay / Outdoor
- Draw: 32S/32Q/16D
- Prize money: $60,000 / $25,000

The Naples Women's World Tennis Tour are tournaments for professional female tennis players played on outdoor clay courts. The events are classified as $60,000 and $25,000 ITF Women's World Tennis Tour tournaments and have been held in Naples, Florida, United States, since 2016.

== Past finals ==
=== Singles ===
Year	Champion	Runner-up	Score
2025	(Canada) Katherine Sebov	(Italy) Jessica Pieri	6–2, 6–0
2024 (2)	(Belgium) Marie Benoît	(Switzerland) Leonie Küng	6–4, 1–6, 6–4
2024 (1)	(United States) Clervie Ngounoue	(United States) Allie Kiick	6–1, 6–1
2023 (2)	(United States) Caroline Dolehide	(Ukraine) Yulia Starodubtseva	7–5, 7–5
2023 (1)	(United States) Emma Navarro	(United States) Peyton Stearns	6–3, 7–5
2022 (2)	(United States) Kayla Day	(Mexico) Ana Sofía Sánchez	6–1, 6–1
2022 (1)	(United States) Madison Sieg	(United States) Samantha Crawford	6–2, 1–0, ret.
2021 (2)	(Bosnia and Herzegovina) Nefisa Berberović	(South Korea) Jang Su-jeong	7–5, 2–6, 7–5
2021 (1)	(Hungary) Panna Udvardy	(Romania) Irina Fetecău	6–0, 6–3
2020	Tournament cancelled due to the COVID-19 pandemic		
2019 (2)	(Australia) Seone Mendez	(Hungary) Panna Udvardy	6–3, 6–4
2019 (1)	(United States) Katerina Stewart	(Australia) Belinda Woolcock	6–4, 6–3
2018	(United States) Nicole Gibbs	(United States) Ashley Kratzer	6–4, 6–4
2017 (2)	(Russia) Sofya Zhuk	(United States) Taylor Townsend	6–4, 7–6^{(7–3)}
2017 (1)	(United States) Claire Liu	(United States) Danielle Collins	6–3, 6–1
2016 (2)	(Russia) Valeria Solovyeva	(United States) Kayla Day	6–4, 6–0
2016 (1)	(Austria) Barbara Haas	(Ukraine) Elizaveta Ianchuk	3–6, 6–2, 6–2

=== Doubles ===
Year	Champions	Runners-up	Score
2025	(United States) Allura Zamarripa (United States) Maribella Zamarripa	(France) Julie Belgraver (Netherlands) Jasmijn Gimbrère	7–5, 6–1
2024 (2)	(United States) Elvina Kalieva; Maria Kozyreva	(Netherlands) Isabelle Haverlag (Bulgaria) Lia Karatancheva	6–0, 6–0
2024 (1)	(Belgium) Marie Benoît (Switzerland) Leonie Küng	(Japan) Mayuka Aikawa (Chinese Taipei) Hsu Chieh-yu	6–7^{(2–7)}, 6–2, [10–8]
2023 (2)	(United States) Christina Rosca (Australia) Astra Sharma	(United States) Sophie Chang (United States) Angela Kulikov	6–1, 7–6^{(15–13)}
2023 (1)	(United States) Reese Brantmeier (United States) Makenna Jones	(United Kingdom) Emily Appleton (United States) Quinn Gleason	6–4, 6–2
2022 (2)	(United States) Anna Rogers (United States) Christina Rosca	(United States) Rasheeda McAdoo (Mexico) Ana Sofía Sánchez	6–1, 6–4
2022 (1)	(Latvia) Līga Dekmeijere; Maria Kononova	(United States) Qavia Lopez (United States) Madison Sieg	6–7^{(0–7)}, 6–3, [19–17]
2021 (2)	(United States) Hanna Chang (United States) Elizabeth Mandlik	(Chinese Taipei) Hsu Chieh-yu (Indonesia) Jessy Rompies	6–4, 1–6, [10–7]
2021 (1)	(Norway) Ulrikke Eikeri (United States) Catherine Harrison	(Japan) Erina Hayashi (Japan) Kanako Morisaki	6–2, 3–6, [10–2]
2020	Tournament cancelled due to the COVID-19 pandemic		
2019 (2)	(Mexico) María Portillo Ramírez (Romania) Gabriela Talabă	(Croatia) Lea Bošković (Australia) Seone Mendez	7–5, 6–2
2019 (1)	(United States) Mara Schmidt (Australia) Belinda Woolcock	(United States) Reese Brantmeier (United States) Kimmi Hance	6–3, 5–7, [10–6]
2018	(Kazakhstan) Anna Danilina (Australia) Genevieve Lorbergs	(United States) Rasheeda McAdoo (United States) Katerina Stewart	6–3, 1–6, [11–9]
2017 (2)	(United States) Emina Bektas (Chile) Alexa Guarachi	(United States) Sophie Chang (Norway) Ulrikke Eikeri	6–3, 6–1
2017 (1)	(United States) Emina Bektas (United States) Sanaz Marand	(United States) Danielle Collins (United States) Taylor Townsend	7–6^{(7–1)}, 6–1
2016 (2)	(Brazil) Gabriela Cé (Poland) Justyna Jegiołka	(United States) Sophie Chang (Mexico) Renata Zarazúa	6–1, 6–2
2016 (1)	(Russia) Valeria Solovyeva (Ukraine) Maryna Zanevska	(United States) Sophie Chang (Netherlands) Quirine Lemoine	7–5, 6–0
