= 2021 Aberto da República =

Tennis tournament

- Date: 22–28 November 2021
- Edition: 1st
- Category: ATP Challenger Tour; ITF Women's World Tennis Tour
- Prize money: $52,080 (men) $60,000 (women)
- Surface: Clay / Outdoor (men); Clay / Indoor (women)
- Location: Brasília, Brazil

Champions

Men's singles
- (Argentina) Federico Coria

Women's singles
- (Hungary) Panna Udvardy

Men's doubles
- (Brazil) Mateus Alves / (Brazil) Gustavo Heide

Women's doubles
- (Brazil) Carolina Alves / (Argentina) María Lourdes Carlé
| Aberto da República | · 2022 → |

The 2021 Aberto da República was a professional tennis tournament played on outdoor (men) and indoor (women) clay courts. It was the first edition of the tournament which was part of the 2021 ATP Challenger Tour and the 2021 ITF Women's World Tennis Tour. It took place in Brasília, Brazil between 22 and 28 November 2021.

== Men's singles main-draw entrants ==
=== Seeds ===
| Country | Player | Rank^{1} | Seed |
|---|---|---|---|
| ARG | Federico Coria | 69 | 1 |
| ESP | Jaume Munar | 83 | 2 |
| ~~ARG~~ | ~~Sebastián Báez~~ | ~~111~~ | ~~3~~ |
| ARG | Francisco Cerúndolo | 112 | 4 |
| BOL | Hugo Dellien | 120 | 5 |
| ARG | Tomás Martín Etcheverry | 129 | 6 |
| BRA | Thiago Seyboth Wild | 132 | 7 |
| ARG | Juan Ignacio Londero | 144 | 8 |

- ^{1} Rankings are as of 15 November 2021.

=== Other entrants ===
The following players received wildcards into the singles main draw:

- (Brazil) Mateus Alves
- (Brazil) Gustavo Heide
- (Brazil) Wilson Leite

The following player received entry into the singles main draw as an alternate:

- (Colombia) Alejandro González

The following players received entry from the qualifying draw:

- (Russia) Bogdan Bobrov
- (Italy) Luciano Darderi
- (Colombia) Alejandro Gómez
- (Slovenia) Tomás Lipovšek Puches

The following player received entry as a lucky loser:

- (Brazil) José Pereira

== Women's singles main-draw entrants ==
=== Seeds ===
| Country | Player | Rank^{1} | Seed |
|---|---|---|---|
| HUN | Panna Udvardy | 115 | 1 |
| PAR | Verónica Cepede Royg | 208 | 2 |
| ~~BRA~~ | ~~Laura Pigossi~~ | ~~218~~ | ~~3~~ |
| ROU | Gabriela Lee | 229 | 4 |
| BRA | Carolina Alves | 258 | 5 |
| RUS | Elina Avanesyan | 261 | 6 |
| ARG | María Lourdes Carlé | 262 | 7 |
| CHN | You Xiaodi | 265 | 8 |

- ^{1} Rankings are as of 15 November 2021.

=== Other entrants ===
The following players received wildcards into the singles main draw:

- (Brazil) Ana Candiotto
- (Brazil) Sofia da Cruz Mendonça
- (Brazil) Júlia Klimovicz
- (Brazil) Maria Luisa Oliveira

The following players received entry using protected rankings:

- (Brazil) Thaisa Grana Pedretti
- (Australia) Olivia Tjandramulia

The following players received entry from the qualifying draw:

- (Argentina) Martina Capurro Taborda
- (Paraguay) Lara Escauriza
- (Netherlands) Merel Hoedt
- (Germany) Jasmin Jebawy
- (Serbia) Katarina Jokić
- (United States) Sabastiani León
- (Germany) Luisa Meyer auf der Heide
- (Germany) Emily Welker

The following players received entry as lucky losers:

- (Estonia) Maria Lota Kaul
- (Bolivia) Noelia Zeballos

== Champions ==
=== Men's singles ===
- (Argentina) Federico Coria def. (Spain) Jaume Munar 7–5, 6–3.

=== Women's singles ===
- (Hungary) Panna Udvardy def. (Russia) Elina Avanesyan, 0–6, 6–4, 6–3

=== Men's doubles ===
- (Brazil) Mateus Alves / (Brazil) Gustavo Heide def. (Italy) Luciano Darderi / (Argentina) Genaro Alberto Olivieri 6–3, 6–3.

=== Women's doubles ===
- (Brazil) Carolina Alves / (Argentina) María Lourdes Carlé def. (Ukraine) Valeriya Strakhova / (Australia) Olivia Tjandramulia 6–2, 6–1
