= Palmetto Pro Open =

- 2026 Palmetto Pro Open

Women's World Tennis Tour
- Event name: Palmetto Pro Open
- Location: Sumter, South Carolina, United States
- Venue: Palmetto Tennis Center
- Category: ITF Women's World Tennis Tour
- Surface: Hard / Outdoor
- Draw: 32S/32Q/16D
- Prize money: $100,000

The Palmetto Pro Open is a tournament for professional female tennis players played on outdoor hard courts. The event is classified as a $100,000 ITF Women's World Tennis Tour tournament and has been held in Sumter, South Carolina, United States, since 2008.

== Past finals ==
=== Singles ===
| Year | Champion | Runner-up | Score |
|---|---|---|---|
| 2026 | Kristina Liutova | (United States) Reese Brantmeier | 6–4, 6–3 |
↑ ITF $100,000 ↑
| 2025 | (Czech Republic) Darja Viďmanová | (Canada) Cadence Brace | 7–5, 6–1 |
| 2024 | (Canada) Carson Branstine | (United States) Sophie Chang | 7–6^{(8–6)}, 6–7^{(6–8)}, 6–1 |
| 2023 | (Ukraine) Yulia Starodubtseva | (India) Karman Thandi | 6–7^{(5–7)}, 7–5, 6–4 |
↑ ITF $60,000 ↑
| 2022 | (United States) Sophie Chang | (United States) Hanna Chang | 6–2, 4–6, 7–6^{(7–5)} |
| 2021 | (United States) Peyton Stearns | (Mexico) Fernanda Contreras | 6–1, 6–2 |
| 2020 | Tournament cancelled due to the COVID-19 pandemic | | |
| 2019 | (United States) Hailey Baptiste | (United States) Victoria Duval | 6–2, 7–5 |
| 2018 | (United States) Taylor Townsend | (France) Alizé Lim | Walkover |
| 2017 | (United States) Ashley Lahey | (United States) Francesca Di Lorenzo | 6–3, 7–6^{(7–4)} |
| 2016 | (United States) CiCi Bellis | (Russia) Valeria Solovyeva | 6–1, 6–3 |
| 2015 | (Japan) Mayo Hibi | (United States) Lauren Embree | 6–4, 3–6, 6–4 |
↑ ITF $25,000 ↑
| 2014 | (United States) Brooke Austin | (United States) Nadja Gilchrist | 7–6^{(7–5)}, 2–6, 6–1 |
| 2013 | (United States) Jamie Loeb | (United States) Brooke Austin | 6–4, 6–3 |
| 2012 | (United States) Louisa Chirico | (United States) Victoria Duval | 6–4, 6–3 |
| 2011 | (United States) Alexis King | (United States) Brooke Austin | 6–3, 7–5 |
| 2010 | (Croatia) Jelena Pandžić | (United States) Alexis King | 6–2, 1–6, 6–2 |
| 2009 | (Slovenia) Petra Rampre | (Romania) Anda Perianu | 6–1, 6–4 |
| 2008 | (United States) Mallory Cecil | (United States) Theresa Logar | 3–6, 7–6^{(8–6)}, 6–4 |
↑ ITF $10,000 ↑

=== Doubles ===
| Year | Champions | Runners-up | Score |
|---|---|---|---|
| 2026 | (United States) Catherine Harrison (Australia) Alexandra Osborne | (United States) Anna Rogers (United States) Allura Zamarripa | 4–6, 6–4, [10–7] |
| 2025 | (United Kingdom) Tara Moore (United States) Abigail Rencheli | (Chinese Taipei) Liang En-shuo (China) Ma Yexin | 7–5, 6–2 |
| 2024 | (Spain) Alicia Herrero Liñana (Argentina) Melany Krywoj | (United States) Sophie Chang (United States) Dalayna Hewitt | 6–3, 6–3 |
| 2023 | (United States) Maria Mateas (United States) Anna Rogers | (United States) McCartney Kessler (Ukraine) Yulia Starodubtseva | 6–4, 6–7^{(3–7)}, [10–6] |
| 2022 | (United States) Kylie Collins (United States) Peyton Stearns | (United States) Allura Zamarripa (United States) Maribella Zamarripa | 6–3, 5–7, [10–7] |
| 2021 | (United States) Emina Bektas (United States) Catherine Harrison | (New Zealand) Paige Hourigan (Indonesia) Aldila Sutjiadi | 7–5, 6–4 |
| 2020 | Tournament cancelled due to the COVID-19 pandemic | | |
| 2019 | (United States) Brynn Boren (United States) Caitlin Whoriskey | (Montenegro) Vladica Babić (United States) Hayley Carter | 6–4, 6–4 |
| 2018 | (Australia) Astra Sharma (Brazil) Luisa Stefani | (United States) Julia Elbaba (China) Xu Shilin | 2–6, 6–3, [10–5] |
| 2017 | (United States) Kaitlyn Christian (Mexico) Giuliana Olmos | (Australia) Ellen Perez (Brazil) Luisa Stefani | 6–2, 3–6, [10–7] |
| 2016 | (United States) Ashley Weinhold (United States) Caitlin Whoriskey | (United States) Jamie Loeb (Canada) Carol Zhao | 7–6^{(7–5)}, 6–1 |
| 2015 | (United States) Alexandra Mueller (United States) Ashley Weinhold | (United States) Jacqueline Cako (United States) Danielle Lao | 5–7, 7–5, [10–6] |
| 2014 | (United States) Sophie Chang (United States) Andie Daniell | (Canada) Sonja Molnar (United States) Caitlin Whoriskey | 6–1, 6–3 |
| 2013 | (United States) Kristy Frilling (United States) Alexandra Mueller | (United States) Jamie Loeb (United States) Sanaz Marand | 6–4, 6–3 |
| 2012 | (United States) Jan Abaza (United Kingdom) Nicola Slater | (United States) Elizabeth Ferris (Japan) Mayo Hibi | 7–6^{(7–1)}, 6–3 |
| 2011 | (Australia) Bojana Bobusic (United Kingdom) Nicola Slater | (Australia) Ebony Panoho (Australia) Storm Sanders | 4–6, 7–5, [10–6] |
| 2010 | (United States) Alexandra Mueller (United States) Ashley Weinhold | (United States) Alexandra Leatu (United States) Nicole Melichar | 6–1, 6–3 |
| 2009 | (United States) Allie Will (United States) Caitlyn Williams | (United States) Mami Inoue (United States) Kyle McPhillips | 6–4, 6–4 |
| 2008 | (United States) Brooke Bolender (United States) Beatrice Capra | (United States) Anna Lubinsky (Netherlands) Bo Verhulsdonk | 2–6, 6–2, [10–6] |
