= Aberto da República =

- 2023 Aberto da República

Defunct tennis tournament
- Location: Rio de Janeiro, Brazil (WTA in 2022); Brasília, Brazil (2021, 2023)
- Venue: Arena BRB (2023), Rio Tennis Academy (2022), Iate Club de Brasília (2021)
- Surface: Clay / Outdoors
ATP Tour
- Category: ATP Challenger Tour 100 (2023)
- Draw: 32S/16Q/16D
- Prize money: $130,000 (2023), $52,080
WTA Tour
- Category: ITF Women's World Tennis Tour
- Draw: 32S/32Q/16D
- Prize money: $60,000

The Aberto da República was a professional tennis tournament played on outdoor clay courts. It was part of the ITF Women's World Tennis Tour and was last held in Rio de Janeiro, Brazil in 2022. It was also previously part of the ATP Challenger Tour and was held in Brasília, Brazil in 2021, and in 2023 (only the Men's tournament, as a Challenger 100).

== Past finals ==
=== Men's singles ===
Year	Champion	Runner-up	Score
2023	(Chile) Alejandro Tabilo	(Argentina) Román Andrés Burruchaga	6–3, 7–6^{(8–6)}
2022	Not held		
2021	(Argentina) Federico Coria	(Spain) Jaume Munar	7–5, 6–3

=== Women's singles ===
Year	Champion	Runner-up	Score
2022	Iryna Shymanovich	Irina Khromacheva	6–2, 5–7, 6–4
2021	(Hungary) Panna Udvardy	(Russia) Elina Avanesyan	0–6, 6–4, 6–3

=== Men's doubles ===
Year	Champions	Runners-up	Score
2023	(Colombia) Nicolás Barrientos (Sweden) André Göransson	(Brazil) Marcelo Demoliner (Brazil) Rafael Matos	7–6^{(7–3)}, 4–6, [11–9]
2022	Not held		
2021	(Brazil) Mateus Alves (Brazil) Gustavo Heide	(Italy) Luciano Darderi (Argentina) Genaro Alberto Olivieri	6–3, 6–3

=== Women's doubles ===
Year	Champions	Runners-up	Score
2022	(Brazil) Ingrid Martins (Portugal) Francisca Jorge	(United States) Anna Rogers (United States) Christina Rosca	6–4, 6–3
2021	(Brazil) Carolina Alves (Argentina) María Lourdes Carlé	(Ukraine) Valeriya Strakhova (Australia) Olivia Tjandramulia	6–2, 6–1
