= Yuliia Starodubtseva =

Ukrainian tennis player (born 2000)

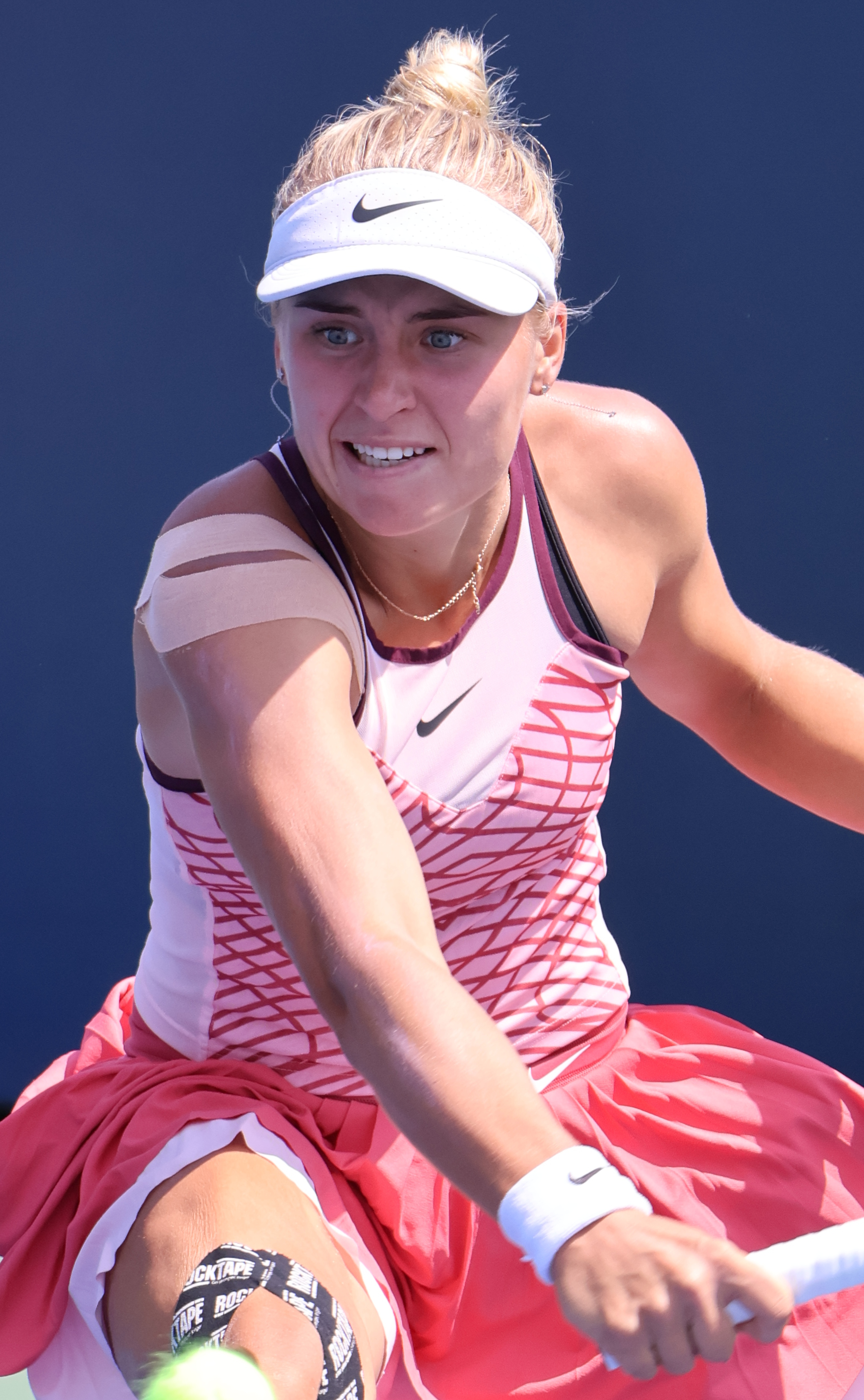
- Starodubtseva at the 2023 US Open
- Full name: Yuliia Volodymyrivna Starodubtseva
- Native name: Юлія Володимирівна Стародубцева
- Country (sports): Ukraine
- Born: 17 February 2000 (age 26) Kakhovka, Ukraine
- Plays: Right (two-handed backhand)
- College: Old Dominion
- Prize money: US$ 2,478,820

Singles
- Career record: 162–122
- Career titles: 0
- Highest ranking: No. 53 (6 April 2026)
- Current ranking: No. 74 (24 August 2026)

Grand Slam singles results
- Australian Open: 1R (2024, 2025, 2026)
- French Open: 3R (2025, 2026)
- Wimbledon: 2R (2024, 2025)
- US Open: 3R (2026)

Doubles
- Career record: 51–34
- Career titles: 0
- Highest ranking: No. 144 (6 May 2024)
- Current ranking: No. 190 (24 August 2026)

Grand Slam doubles results
- French Open: 2R (2025, 2026)
- Wimbledon: 2R (2026)
- US Open: 1R (2025, 2026)
- Last updated on: 24 August 2026.

Yuliia Volodymyrivna Starodubtseva (Ukrainian: Юлія Володимирівна Стародубцева; born 17 February 2000) is a Ukrainian professional tennis player. She has a career-high WTA singles ranking of world No. 53, achieved on 6 April 2026 and a doubles ranking of No. 144, reached on 6 May 2024.

Starodubtseva has won four singles titles and three doubles titles on the ITF Circuit.

She played college tennis at Old Dominion University.

== Career ==
=== 2023: First ITF Circuit title ===
Starodubtseva won her first $60k tournament in June 2023 in Sumter, South Carolina, defeating Indian player Karman Thandi.

=== 2024: Major debut, WTA 1000 quarterfinal ===
Starodubtseva made her major debut at the Australian Open after qualifying, but lost in the first round to sixth seed Ons Jabeur. She also qualified for the French Open, but again lost in the first round, this time to Cristina Bucșa.

As a qualifier once more, Starodubtseva recorded her first main-draw major win at Wimbledon, defeating Alison Van Uytvanck. In the second round, she lost to fellow qualifier Lulu Sun.

Ranked No. 146, Starodubtseva made her debut at the US Open after qualifying into the main-draw, but lost in the first round to 20th seed Victoria Azarenka in three sets. Starodubtseva became the first woman in the Open Era to qualify for all four majors in a single season.

In September, Starodubtseva reached her first WTA Tour quarterfinal at the Jasmin Open by defeating Suzan Lamens and third seed Diane Parry, before losing to Sonay Kartal.

At the China Open, Starodubtseva recorded, after qualifying, her first main-draw WTA 1000-level wins over Laura Siegemund, 27th seed Kateřina Siniaková, Elina Avanesyan and 10th seed Anna Kalinskaya to reach the quarterfinals. Despite losing to sixth seed Coco Gauff in the last eight, Starodubtseva entered the top-100 in the singles rankings on 7 October 2024.

=== 2025: French Open third round, top 70 ===
At the French Open Starodubtseva lost to Sára Bejlek in straight sets in the last round of qualifying, ending a 14-match winning streak in Grand Slam qualifying. However, she entered the main-draw as a lucky loser and defeated qualifier Tamara Korpatsch, and Anastasia Potapova to reach the third round of a major for the first time, at which point her run was ended by fourth seed Jasmine Paolini. As a result of her performance at Roland Garos, she reached a new career-high ranking of world No. 67 on 9 June 2025.

At the Ningbo Open where Starodubtseva qualified for the main-draw, she overcame Yulia Putintseva to make it into the second round, where she pushed sixth seed Belinda Bencic to three sets in what was the longest match of the 2025 season to that point, lasting three hours and 33 minutes. As a result, she moved 19 positions up to No. 112 on 20 October 2025.

=== 2026: First WTA final ===
In March, Starodubtseva qualified for the main draw at the Miami Open, defeating Eva Lys and 30th seed Cristina Bucșa, before losing to sixth seed Amanda Anisimova in the third round.

At the Charleston Open, she recorded wins over Zhang Shuai, lucky loser Ekaterine Gorgodze, Renata Zarazúa, McCartney Kessler and fifth seed Madison Keys to reach her first WTA Tour final. She lost the championship match to top seed and defending champion, Jessica Pegula, in straight sets. Despite the defeat, Starodubtseva moved up to a new career-high ranking of world No. 53 on 6 April 2026.

At the French Open, Starodubtseva defeated Anna Blinkova and second seed Elena Rybakina to reach the third round for the second consecutive year, at which point she lost to qualifier Wang Xiyu.

In August at the Monterrey Open, she recorded wins over Lilli Tagger and seventh seed Janice Tjen to make it into the quarterfinals, where she lost to second seed Elise Mertens. At the US Open, Starodubtseva defeated Ella Seidel and 32nd seed Maria Sakkari to reach the third round of this major for the first time, at which point her run was ended by world No. 2 Elena Rybakina.

== Performance timeline ==
Key
W	F	SF	QF	#R	RR	Q#	P#	DNQ	A	Z#	PO	G	S	B	NMS	NTI	P	NH

(W) winner; (F) finalist; (SF) semifinalist; (QF) quarterfinalist; (#R) rounds 4, 3, 2, 1; (RR) round-robin stage; (Q#) qualification round; (P#) preliminary round; (DNQ) did not qualify; (A) absent; (Z#) Davis/Fed Cup Zonal Group (with number indication) or (PO) play-off; (G) gold, (S) silver or (B) bronze Olympic/Paralympic medal; (NMS) not a Masters tournament; (NTI) not a Tier I tournament; (P) postponed; (NH) not held; (SR) strike rate (events won / competed); (W–L) win–loss record.
To avoid confusion and double counting, these charts are updated at the conclusion of a tournament or when the player's participation has ended.

Only main-draw results in WTA Tour, Grand Slam tournaments, Billie Jean King Cup, United Cup, Hopman Cup and Olympic Games are included in win–loss records.

=== Singles ===
Current through the 2026 Wuhan Open.

Tournament	2023	2024	2025	2026	SR	W–L	Win %
Grand Slam tournaments
Australian Open	A	1R	1R	1R	0 / 3	0–3	
French Open	A	1R	3R	3R	0 / 3	4–3	
Wimbledon	A	2R	2R	1R	0 / 3	2–3	
US Open	Q1	1R	1R	3R	0 / 3	2–3	
Win–loss	0–0	1–4	3–4	4–4	0 / 12	8–12	
WTA 1000 tournaments
Qatar Open	NTI	A	Q1	Q2	0 / 0	0–0	
Dubai Championships	A	A	A	Q1	0 / 0	0–0	
Indian Wells Open	A	A	Q1	Q1	0 / 0	0–0	
Miami Open	A	A	1R	3R	0 / 2	2–2	
Madrid Open	A	A	4R	2R	0 / 2	4–2	
Italian Open	A	Q2	Q1	1R	0 / 1	0–1	
Canadian Open	A	A	3R	1R	0 / 2	2–2	
Cincinnati Open	A	A	1R	1R	0 / 2	0–2	
China Open	A	QF	1R	1R	0 / 3	4–3	
Wuhan Open	NH	Q2	Q1	1R	0 / 1	0–1	
Win–loss	0–0	4–1	5–5	3–7	0 / 13	12–13	

== WTA Tour finals ==
=== Singles: 1 (runner-up) ===
Legend WTA 500 (0–1)	Finals by surface Clay (0–1)

Result	Date	Tournament	Tier	Surface	Opponent	Score
Loss	Apr 2026	Charleston Open, US	WTA 500	Clay	(United States) Jessica Pegula	2–6, 2–6

== ITF Circuit finals ==
=== Singles: 6 (4 titles, 2 runner-ups) ===
Legend W60 tournaments (3–2) W25 tournaments (1–0)	Finals by surface Hard (4–1) Clay (0–1)

Result	W–L	Date	Tournament	Tier	Surface	Opponent	Score
Win	1–0	Mar 2023	ITF Spring, US	W25	Hard	(United States) Maria Mateas	6–3, 2–6, 6–2
Loss	1–1	May 2023	Naples Open, US	W60	Clay	(United States) Caroline Dolehide	5–7, 5–7
Win	2–1	Jun 2023	Palmetto Pro Open, US	W60	Hard	(India) Karman Thandi	6–7^{(5)}, 7–5, 6–4
Loss	2–2	Jul 2023	Evansville Classic, US	W60	Hard	(India) Karman Thandi	5–7, 6–4, 1–6
Win	3–2	Jul 2023	Dallas Summer Series, US	W60	Hard (i)	(China) Wang Yafan	3–6, 6–2, 6–2
Win	4–2	Oct 2023	Rancho Santa Fe Open, US	W60	Hard	(Switzerland) Lulu Sun	7–5, 6–3

=== Doubles: 8 (3 titles, 5 runner-ups) ===
Legend W100 tournaments (1–0) W60 tournaments (1–2) W25 tournaments (1–2) 10K tournaments (0–1)	Finals by surface Hard (2–2) Clay (1–3)

Result	W–L	Date	Tournament	Tier	Surface	Partner	Opponents	Score
Loss	0–1	Dec 2016	ITF Cairo, Egypt	10K	Clay	(Ukraine) Anastasiia Gevel	(Germany) Lisa-Marie Brunnemann (Romania) Diana Popescu	6–3, 0–6, [7–10]
Loss	0–2	Mar 2023	ITF Spring, US	W25	Hard	(United Kingdom) Sofia Johnson	(United States) Maria Mateas (United States) Clervie Ngounoue	4–6, 6–2, [4–10]
Win	1–2	Apr 2023	ITF Zephyrhills, US	W25	Clay	Maria Kononova	(United States) Jada Hart (United States) Rasheeda McAdoo	7–5, 6–3
Loss	1–3	Jun 2023	Palmetto Pro Open, US	W60	Hard	(United States) McCartney Kessler	(United States) Maria Mateas (United States) Anna Rogers	4–6, 7–6^{(3)}, [6–10]
Loss	1–4	Jun 2023	ITF Santo Domingo, Dominican Republic	W25	Clay	(Mexico) Ana Sofía Sánchez	(Colombia) María Herazo González; Ksenia Laskutova	6–2, 4–6, [9–11]
Loss	1–5	Jul 2023	Evansville Classic, US	W60	Hard	(United States) McCartney Kessler	Maria Kononova (Ukraine) Veronika Miroshnichenko	3–6, 6–2, [8–10]
Win	2–5	Aug 2023	Landisville Tennis Challenge, US	W100	Hard	(United States) Sophie Chang	(Australia) Olivia Gadecki (Japan) Mai Hontama	walkover
Win	3–5	Oct 2023	Rancho Santa Fe Open, US	W60	Hard	(United States) Makenna Jones	Tatiana Prozorova (United States) Madison Sieg	6–3, 4–6, [10–6]

== Wins against top 10 players ==
No.	Player	Rk	Event	Surface	Rd	Score	Rk	Years	Ref
1	(Kazakhstan) Elena Rybakina	2	French Open, France	Clay	2R	3–6, 6–1, 7–6^{(10–4)}	55	2026	

- Key: (Rk) first use, opponent rank; (Rd) round; (Rk) 2nd use, player rank; (Ref) reference; (F) final; (SF) semifinal; (QF) quarterfinal; (#R) rounds 4, 3, 2, 1; (RR) round-robin stage; (Q#) qualifying rounds or stages (3), 2, 1.
