= Christina Rosca =

American tennis player

- Country (sports): United States
- Born: July 25, 1997 (age 28) Princeton, New Jersey, U.S.
- College: Vanderbilt
- Prize money: $70,852

Singles
- Career record: 88–80
- Highest ranking: No. 499 (December 19, 2022)
- Current ranking: No. 1278 (October 14, 2024)

Doubles
- Career record: 116–68
- Career titles: 12 ITF
- Highest ranking: No. 162 (September 18, 2023)
- Current ranking: No. 232 (October 14, 2024)
- Last updated on: October 16, 2024.

Christina Rosca (born July 25, 1997) is an American tennis player.

Rosca has a career-high singles ranking by the WTA of 499, achieved on December 19, 2022. She also has a career-high WTA doubles ranking of 162, achieved on September 18, 2023.

Rosca won her first bigger ITF Circuit title at the 2022 Mercer Tennis Classic, in the doubles draw partnering Anna Rogers.

Rosca played college tennis at Vanderbilt University.

== ITF Circuit finals ==
=== Doubles: 19 (12 titles, 7 runner-ups) ===
Legend
W60/75 tournaments
W25/35 tournaments
W15 tournaments

Result	W–L	Date	Tournament	Tier	Surface	Partner	Opponents	Score
Loss	0–1	Jun 2019	ITF Amarante, Portugal	W15	Hard	(Republic of Ireland) Georgia Drummy	(Portugal) Francisca Jorge (Spain) Olga Parres Azcoitia	4–6, 6–2, [10–12]
Win	1–1	Jun 2019	ITF Madrid, Spain	W15	Hard	(Lithuania) Justina Mikulskytė	(Romania) Ioana Loredana Roșca (Bulgaria) Julia Terziyska	6–3, 6–7^{(8)}, [10–8]
Win	2–1	Jun 2021	ITF Antalya, Turkey	W15	Clay	(United States) Jessie Aney	(Italy) Costanza Traversi (Romania) Andreea Velcea	6–1, 6–0
Loss	2–2	Jun 2021	ITF Antalya, Turkey	W15	Clay	(United States) Jessie Aney	(Turkey) Başak Eraydın (Hungary) Amarissa Kiara Tóth	6–4, 1–6, [7–10]
Loss	2–3	Jul 2021	ITF Antalya, Turkey	W15	Clay	(Bulgaria) Ani Vangelova	(France) Julie Belgraver (Hungary) Amarissa Kiara Tóth	2–6, 5–7
Win	3–3	Oct 2021	ITF Cancún, Mexico	W15	Hard	(United States) Anna Rogers	(United States) Dasha Ivanova (United States) Lauren Proctor	6–2, 6–2
Win	4–3	Oct 2021	ITF Cancún, Mexico	W15	Hard	(United States) Anna Rogers	(Canada) Louise Kwong (United States) Anna Ulyashchenko	6–3, 6–1
Win	5–3	Nov 2021	Orlando USTA Pro Circuit Event, United States	W25	Clay	(United States) Anna Rogers	(France) Marine Partaud (Mexico) María Portillo Ramírez	6–3, 6–1
Loss	5–4	Jan 2022	Vero Beach International Tennis Open, United States	W25	Clay	(United States) Anna Rogers	(United States) Sophie Chang (United States) Allie Kiick	3–6, 3–6
Win	6–4	Feb 2022	ITF Cancún, Mexico	W25	Hard	(United States) Anna Rogers	(Russia) Maria Bondarenko (Latvia) Darja Semeņistaja	6–1, 6–4
Win	7–4	Feb 2022	ITF Santo Domingo, Dominican Republic	W25	Hard	(United States) Anna Rogers	(Netherlands) Jasmijn Gimbrère (Netherlands) Isabelle Haverlag	6–2, 6–2
Finalist (Note: singles and doubles competition were abandoned due to ongoing poor weather)	–	Apr 2022	ITF Pretoria, South Africa	W25	Hard	(United States) Anna Rogers	(Hong Kong) Eudice Chong (Hong Kong) Cody Wong	not played
Win	8–4	May 2022	Naples Women's World Tennis Tour, United States	W25	Clay	(United States) Anna Rogers	(United States) Rasheeda McAdoo (Mexico) Ana Sofía Sánchez	6–1, 6–4
Loss	8–5	Oct 2022	ITF Šibenik, Croatia	W25	Clay	(Greece) Eleni Christofi	(Poland) Weronika Falkowska (Australia) Jaimee Fourlis	4–6, 2–6
Win	9–5	Oct 2022	Tennis Classic of Macon, United States	W60	Hard	(United States) Anna Rogers	(United States) Madison Brengle (United States) Maria Mateas	6–4, 6–4
Loss	9–6	Nov 2022	Aberto da República, Brazil	W60	Clay	(United States) Anna Rogers	(Brazil) Ingrid Martins (Portugal) Francisca Jorge	4–6, 3–6
Win	10–6	Feb 2023	Arcadia Pro Open, United States	W60	Hard	(United States) Francesca Di Lorenzo	(Japan) Rina Saigo (Japan) Yukina Saigo	6–1, 6–1
Win	11–6	May 2023	Naples Women's World Tennis Tour, United States	W60	Clay	(Australia) Astra Sharma	(United States) Sophie Chang (United States) Angela Kulikov	6–1, 7–6^{(13)}
Win	12–6	May 2024	Florida's Sports Coast Open, United States	W75	Clay	(Lithuania) Justina Mikulskytė	(United States) Anna Rogers (United States) Alana Smith	6–4, 6–4
Loss	12–7	Jun 2025	ITF Wichita, United States	W35	Hard	(United States) Catherine Harrison	(Spain) Maria Berlanga Bandera (Mexico) Julia García Ruiz	5–7, 5–7
