= Akasha Urhobo =

American tennis player (born 2007)

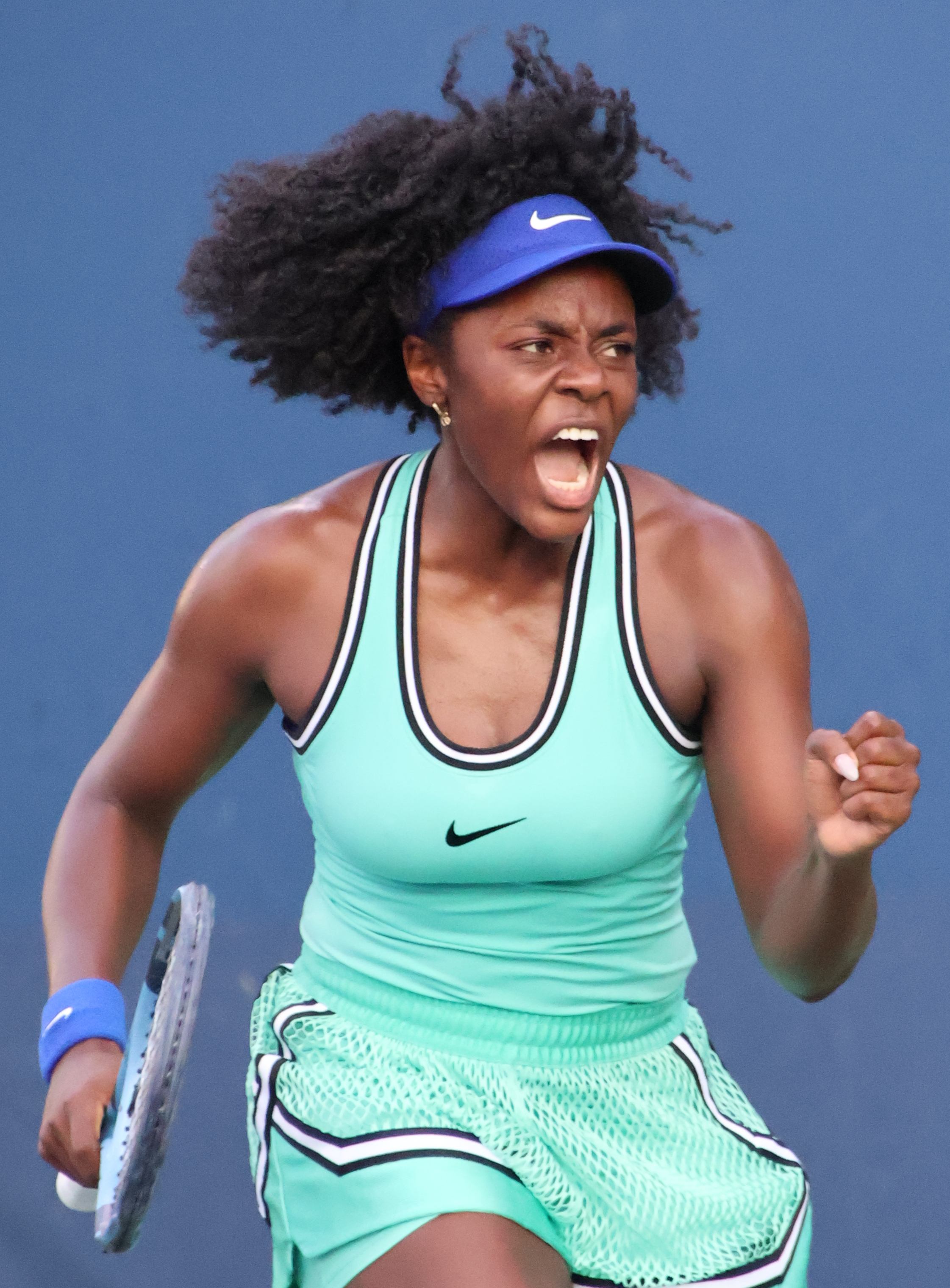
- Urhobo at the 2026 US Open
- Country (sports): United States
- Born: January 19, 2007 (age 19) Fort Lauderdale, Florida, U.S.
- Plays: Right-handed
- Prize money: $296,245

Singles
- Career record: 121–71
- Career titles: 4 ITF
- Highest ranking: No. 176 (15 June 2026)
- Current ranking: No. 176 (22 June 2026)

Grand Slam singles results
- French Open: 1R (2026)
- Wimbledon: Q1 (2026)
- US Open: Q1 (2024, 2025, 2026)

Doubles
- Career record: 20–21
- Career titles: 1 ITF
- Highest ranking: No. 527 (5 May 2025)
- Current ranking: No. 839 (22 June 2026)

Grand Slam doubles results
- US Open: 1R (2025)
- Last updated on: 22 June 2026.

Akasha Urhobo (born 19 January 2007) is an American tennis player. She has a career-high singles ranking by the WTA of world No. 176, achieved on 15 June 2026, and a doubles ranking of No. 527, achieved on 5 May 2025.

Urhobo has a career-high ITF juniors ranking of No. 122, achieved on 1 January 2024.

== Career ==
Urhobo won her first major ITF Circuit title at the 2024 Florida's Sports Coast Open, in the singles draw, defeating Iva Jovic in the final.

She received a wildcard entry for the qualifying competition at the 2024 US Open, but lost in the first round to Priscilla Hon.

She received a wildcard to make her WTA Tour main-draw singles debut at the 2024 Mérida Open but lost to Renata Zarazúa.

Urhobo won the USTA wildcard challenge to a place in the main-draw at 2026 French Open and make her debut at a major. She lost to Katie Boulter in the first round.

== Personal life ==
Urhobo is of Nigerian descent.

== ITF Circuit finals ==
=== Singles: 10 (4 title, 6 runners-up) ===
| Legend W100 tournaments (0–1) W75 tournaments (1–0) W35 tournaments (3–5) | Finals by surface Hard (1-0) Clay (3-6) |

| Result | W–L | Date | Tournament | Tier | Surface | Opponent | Score |
|---|---|---|---|---|---|---|---|
| Loss | 0–1 | Apr 2024 | ITF Boca Raton, United States | W35 | Clay | (United States) Liv Hovde | 6–3, 4–6, 2–6 |
| Win | 1–1 | May 2024 | Florida's Sports Coast Open, United States | W75 | Clay | (United States) Iva Jovic | 6–3, 6–1 |
| Loss | 1–2 | May 2024 | ITF Bethany Beach, United States | W35 | Clay | (Sweden) Kajsa Rinaldo Persson | 6–4, 3–6, 2–6 |
| Loss | 1–3 | Apr 2025 | ITF Boca Raton, United States | W35 | Clay | (United States) Whitney Osuigwe | 4–6, 3–6 |
| Loss | 1–4 | Nov 2025 | ITF Boca Raton, United States | W35 | Clay | (Italy) Francesca Pace | 6–4, 4–6, 4–6 |
| Loss | 1–5 | Dec 2025 | ITF Daytona Beach, United States | W35 | Clay | (United States) Vivian Wolff | 6–7^{(6)}, 3–6 |
| Win | 2–5 | Jan 2026 | ITF Weston, United States | W35 | Clay | (United States) Madison Brengle | 6–2, 4–6, 6–2 |
| Win | 3–5 | Feb 2026 | Arcadia Women's Pro Open, United States | W35 | Hard | (United States) Thea Frodin | 6–2, 2–6, 6–2 |
| Win | 4–5 | Apr 2026 | Florida's Sports Coast Open, United States | W35 | Clay | (Spain) Ángela Fita Boluda | 7–5, 6–4 |
| Loss | 4–6 | Apr 2026 | Bonita Springs Championship, United States | W100 | Clay | (Spain) Ángela Fita Boluda | 3–6, 1–6 |

=== Doubles: 3 (1 title, 2 runner-ups) ===
| Legend W100 tournaments (0–1) W35 tournaments (1–1) | Finals by surface Hard (0–1) Clay (1–1) |

| Result | W–L | Date | Location | Tier | Surface | Partner | Opponents | Score |
|---|---|---|---|---|---|---|---|---|
| Win | 1–0 | Apr 2025 | ITF Boca Raton, United States | W35 | Clay | (United States) Rasheeda McAdoo | (United States) Victoria Osuigwe (United States) Alana Smith | 5–7, 7–6^{(2)}, [10–7] |
| Loss | 1–1 | Nov 2025 | ITF Boca Raton, United States | W35 | Clay | (United States) Rasheeda McAdoo | (Bosnia and Herzegovina) Ema Burgić (Ukraine) Anita Sahdiieva | 6–1, 6–7^{(1)}, [9–11] |
| Loss | 9–8 | Sep 2026 | Central Coast Pro Tennis Open, United States | W100 | Hard | (United States) Whitney Osuigwe | (United States) Savannah Broadus (United States) Allura Zamarripa | 5–7, 2–6 |
