= Maria Mateas =

Romanian-American tennis player (born 1999)

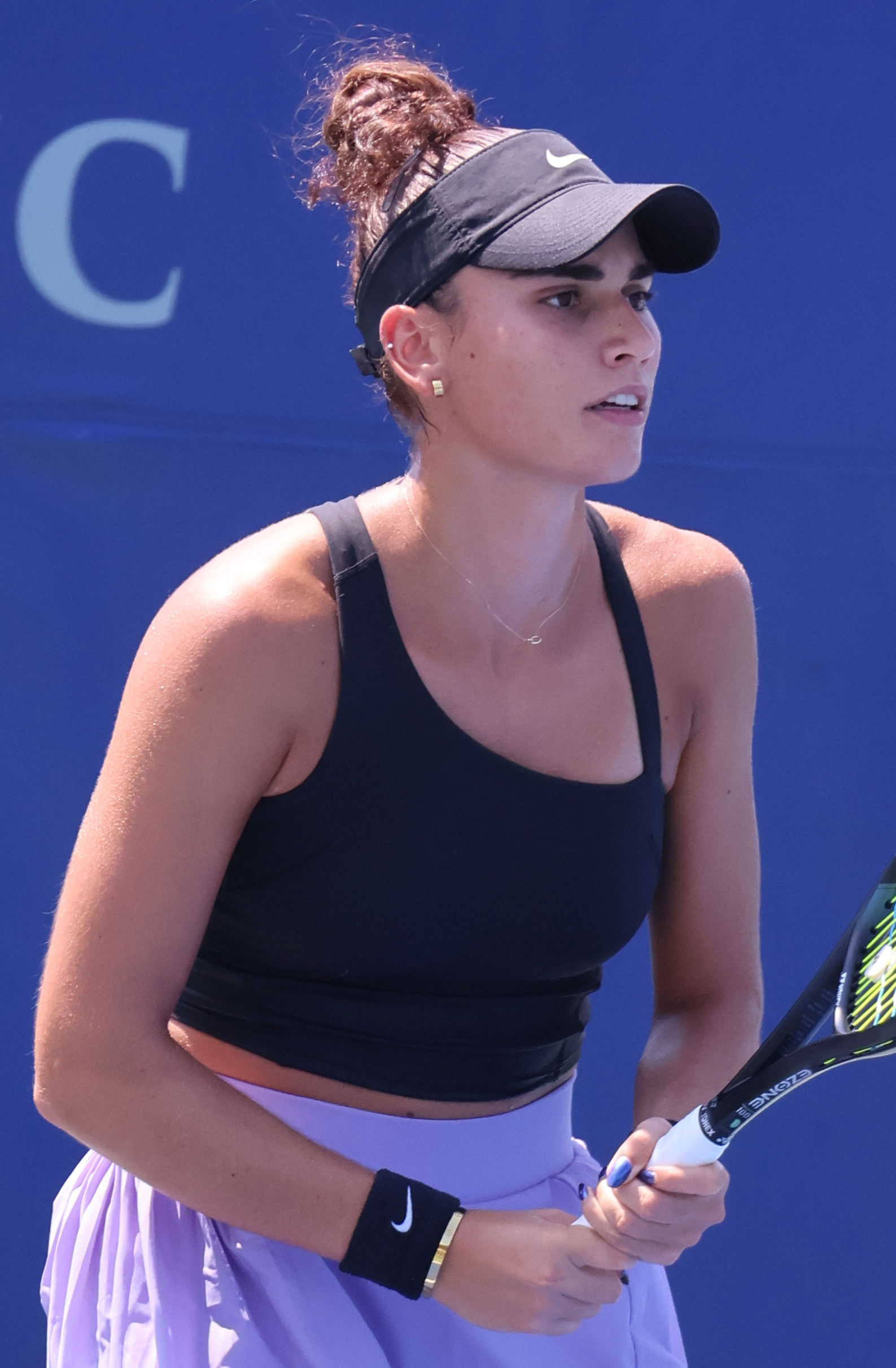
- Mateas in 2024
- Country (sports): United States
- Residence: Braintree, Massachusetts, U.S.
- Born: July 21, 1999 (age 26) Oradea, Romania
- Height: 180 cm (5 ft 11 in)
- Plays: Right (two-handed backhand)
- Prize money: $265,029

Singles
- Career record: 242–205
- Career titles: 3 ITF
- Highest ranking: No. 190 (August 26, 2024)
- Current ranking: No. 331 (October 27, 2025)

Grand Slam singles results
- Wimbledon: Q1 (2025)
- US Open: Q1 (2024)

Doubles
- Career record: 73–73
- Career titles: 6 ITF
- Highest ranking: No. 193 (July 3, 2023)
- Current ranking: No. 338 (October 27, 2025)

Grand Slam mixed doubles results
- US Open: 2R (2024)
- Last updated on: 29 October 2025.

Maria Mateaș (born July 21, 1999) is a Romanian-American tennis player. She has a career-high WTA singles ranking of 190, achieved on 26 August 2024.

On the ITF Junior Circuit, Mateas had a career-high combined ranking of 26 in April 2016.

== Early life ==
Maria Mateas was born in Oradea, Romania, to Calin and Angela Mateas. She has an older brother named Catalin, who was a tennis player.

== Career ==
Mateas made her WTA Tour main-draw debut as a wildcard entrant at the 2016 Bank of the West Classic, losing in the first round to Zheng Saisai.

She made her Grand Slam tournament debut at the 2023 US Open in mixed doubles, partnering Mackenzie McDonald.

Ranked No. 348, Mateas made her singles debut at the WTA 1000 level, after qualifying into the main draw of the 2023 Guadalajara Open, losing in the first round to Emma Navarro.

She won the 2024 ITF Championnats Banque Nationale de Granby, defeating Kayla Cross in the final.

At the 2025 Morocco Open, Mateas won her first WTA Tour main-draw matches, defeating Elizabeth Mandlik and then Arantxa Rus to reach the quarterfinals, where she lost to second seed Camila Osorio.

== ITF Circuit finals ==
=== Singles: 7 (3 titles, 4 runner-ups) ===
Legend W75 tournaments W50 tournaments W25/35 tournaments	Finals by surface Hard (3–4)

Result	W–L	Date	Tournament	Tier	Surface	Opponent	Score
Loss	0–1	Jun 2018	ITF Baton Rouge, United States	W25	Hard	(Australia) Astra Sharma	2–6, 1–6
Win	1–1	Aug 2018	ITF Fort Worth, United States	W25	Hard	(United States) Robin Anderson	6–3, 7–5
Loss	1–2	Mar 2023	ITF Spring, United States	W25	Hard	(Ukraine) Yulia Starodubtseva	3–6, 6–2, 2–6
Win	2–2	Nov 2023	ITF Santo Domingo, Dominican Republic	W25	Hard	(Mexico) Ana Sofía Sánchez	7–5, 7–6^{(2)}
Loss	2–3	Jan 2024	ITF Petit-Bourg, Guadeloupe	W35	Hard	(Sweden) Fanny Östlund	6–4, 4–6, 3–6
Win	3–3	Jul 2024	Championnats de Granby, Canada	W75	Hard	(Canada) Kayla Cross	6–3, 7–6^{(3)}
Loss	3–4	Sep 2024	ITF Redding, United States	W35	Hard	(United States) Lea Ma	3–6, 2–6

=== Doubles: 9 (6 titles, 3 runner-ups) ===
Legend W60/75 tournaments W50 tournaments W25 tournaments	Finals by surface Hard (5–1) Clay (1–2)

Result	W–L	Date	Tournament	Tier	Surface	Partner	Opponents	Score
Loss	0–1	Apr 2018	ITF Pelham, US	W25	Clay	(Mexico) María Portillo Ramírez	(Chile) Alexa Guarachi (New Zealand) Erin Routliffe	1–6, 2–6
Win	1–1	Aug 2022	ITF Ourense, Spain	W25	Hard	(Netherlands) Arantxa Rus	(Spain) Yvonne Cavallé Reimers (Spain) Lucía Cortez Llorca	6–4, 5–7, [10–7]
Loss	1–2	Oct 2022	Tennis Classic of Macon, US	W60	Hard	(United States) Madison Brengle	(United States) Anna Rogers (United States) Christina Rosca	4–6, 4–6
Win	2–2	Mar 2023	ITF Spring, US	W25	Hard	(United States) Clervie Ngounoue	(United Kingdom) Sofia Johnson (Ukraine) Yulia Starodubtseva	6–4, 2–6, [10–4]
Win	3–2	May 2023	ITF Orlando, US	W25	Clay	(United States) Makenna Jones	(United States) Dalayna Hewitt (Serbia) Katarina Jokić	6–4, 6–2
Win	4–2	Jun 2023	ITF Sumter, US	W60	Hard	(United States) Anna Rogers	(United States) McCartney Kessler (Ukraine) Yuliia Starodubtseva	6–4, 6–7^{(3)}, [10–6]
Win	5–2	Jun 2023	ITF Wichita, US	W25	Hard	(United States) Reese Brantmeier	(United States) Ava Markham (Serbia) Alina Shcherbinina	6–2, 6–4
Win	6–2	Jan 2025	ITF Nonthaburi, Thailand	W75	Hard	(United States) Alana Smith	(Chinese Taipei) Cho I-hsuan (Chinese Taipei) Cho Yi-tsen	6–1, 6–3
Loss	6–3	Apr 2025	Florida's Sports Coast Open, US	W50	Clay	(United States) Alana Smith	(Russia) Maria Kozyreva (Belarus) Iryna Shymanovich	4–6, 1–6
