= 2023 ITF Women's World Tennis Tour (April–June) =

The 2023 ITF Women's World Tennis Tour is the 2023 edition of the second-tier tour for women's professional tennis. It is organised by the International Tennis Federation and is a tier below the WTA Tour. The ITF Women's World Tennis Tour includes tournaments in six categories with prize money ranging from $15,000 up to $100,000.

== Key ==
Category
W100 tournaments
W80 tournaments
W60 tournaments
W40 tournaments
W25 tournaments
W15 tournaments

== Month ==
=== April ===
| Week of | Tournament | Winner | Runners-up | Semifinalists | Quarterfinalists |
|---|---|---|---|---|---|
| April 3 | Split, Croatia; Clay; W40; Singles and doubles draws | (Croatia) Tara Würth; 6–2, 3–6, 6–4 | (Czech Republic) Sára Bejlek | Anastasia Gasanova (Slovenia) Veronika Erjavec | (Czech Republic) Dominika Šalková (Spain) Leyre Romero Gormaz (Croatia) Petra Marčinko (Germany) Noma Noha Akugue |
| April 3 | Split, Croatia; Clay; W40; Singles and doubles draws | (Slovenia) Veronika Erjavec (North Macedonia) Lina Gjorcheska; 6–1, 6–4 | (Slovenia) Nika Radišić (Croatia) Tara Würth | Anastasia Gasanova (Slovenia) Veronika Erjavec | (Czech Republic) Dominika Šalková (Spain) Leyre Romero Gormaz (Croatia) Petra Marčinko (Germany) Noma Noha Akugue |
| April 3 | Bujumbura, Burundi; Clay; W25; Singles and doubles draws | (France) Alice Robbe; 6–1, 6–4 | (Burundi) Sada Nahimana | Ksenia Laskutova (Ukraine) Valeriya Strakhova | (Belgium) Tilwith Di Girolami (Romania) Cristina Dinu (Poland) Weronika Baszak; Anna Ureke |
| April 3 | Bujumbura, Burundi; Clay; W25; Singles and doubles draws | Ksenia Laskutova (Sweden) Fanny Östlund; 6–4, 6–3 | (Netherlands) Jasmijn Gimbrère (Germany) Jasmin Jebawy | Ksenia Laskutova (Ukraine) Valeriya Strakhova | (Belgium) Tilwith Di Girolami (Romania) Cristina Dinu (Poland) Weronika Baszak; Anna Ureke |
| April 3 | Santa Margherita di Pula, Italy; Clay; W25; Singles and doubles draws | (United Kingdom) Sonay Kartal; 3–6, 6–2, 6–1 | Ekaterina Makarova | (Romania) Miriam Bulgaru (Poland) Weronika Falkowska | (Netherlands) Arantxa Rus (Germany) Katharina Hobgarski (Turkey) Zeynep Sönmez (Greece) Valentini Grammatikopoulou |
| April 3 | Santa Margherita di Pula, Italy; Clay; W25; Singles and doubles draws | (Poland) Weronika Falkowska (Greece) Valentini Grammatikopoulou; 6–1, 6–1 | (Italy) Angelica Moratelli (Netherlands) Arantxa Rus | (Romania) Miriam Bulgaru (Poland) Weronika Falkowska | (Netherlands) Arantxa Rus (Germany) Katharina Hobgarski (Turkey) Zeynep Sönmez (Greece) Valentini Grammatikopoulou |
| April 3 | Kashiwa, Japan; Hard; W25; Singles and doubles draws | (Japan) Nao Hibino; 6–4, 6–3 | (South Korea) Jang Su-jeong | (China) You Xiaodi (Netherlands) Arianne Hartono | (Australia) Arina Rodionova (South Korea) Han Na-lae (Hong Kong) Cody Wong (Japan) Kyōka Okamura |
| April 3 | Kashiwa, Japan; Hard; W25; Singles and doubles draws | (Netherlands) Arianne Hartono (Australia) Priscilla Hon; 6–4, 3–6, [10–7] | (Japan) Saki Imamura (Japan) Naho Sato | (China) You Xiaodi (Netherlands) Arianne Hartono | (Australia) Arina Rodionova (South Korea) Han Na-lae (Hong Kong) Cody Wong (Japan) Kyōka Okamura |
| April 3 | Jackson, United States; Clay; W25; Singles and doubles draws | (Hungary) Tímea Babos; 7–5, 7–5 | (United States) Whitney Osuigwe | (United States) Victoria Hu (United States) Grace Min | (Indonesia) Priska Madelyn Nugroho (United States) Makenna Jones (United States) Tatum Evans (Ukraine) Ganna Poznikhirenko |
| April 3 | Jackson, United States; Clay; W25; Singles and doubles draws | (United States) Jaeda Daniel (United States) McCartney Kessler; 1–6, 6–1, [10–5] | (United States) Allura Zamarripa (United States) Maribella Zamarripa | (United States) Victoria Hu (United States) Grace Min | (Indonesia) Priska Madelyn Nugroho (United States) Makenna Jones (United States) Tatum Evans (Ukraine) Ganna Poznikhirenko |
| April 3 | Sharm El Sheikh, Egypt; Hard; W15; Singles and doubles draws | Elena Pridankina; 6–3, 6–1 | (China) Wang Meiling | (Australia) Taylah Preston (United Kingdom) Isabelle Lacy | Ekaterina Reyngold (China) Yao Xinxin (Poland) Martyna Kubka; Aliona Falei |
| April 3 | Sharm El Sheikh, Egypt; Hard; W15; Singles and doubles draws | Aliona Falei; Polina Iatcenko; 6–4, 7–5 | Evgeniya Burdina; Ekaterina Shalimova | (Australia) Taylah Preston (United Kingdom) Isabelle Lacy | Ekaterina Reyngold (China) Yao Xinxin (Poland) Martyna Kubka; Aliona Falei |
| April 3 | Singapore, Singapore; Hard; W15; Singles and doubles draws | (Hong Kong) Wu Ho-ching; 1–6, 6–1, 6–1 | (China) Ren Yufei | (Japan) Michika Ozeki (China) Guo Meiqi | (Singapore) Sue Yan Tan (India) Madhurima Sawant (Hong Kong) Maggie Ng (Germany) Emily Welker |
| April 3 | Singapore, Singapore; Hard; W15; Singles and doubles draws | (China) Liu Yanni (China) Ren Yufei; 6–1, 7–5 | (China) Guo Meiqi (Chinese Taipei) Lin Li-hsin | (Japan) Michika Ozeki (China) Guo Meiqi | (Singapore) Sue Yan Tan (India) Madhurima Sawant (Hong Kong) Maggie Ng (Germany) Emily Welker |
| April 3 | Telde, Spain; Clay; W15; Singles and doubles draws | (Spain) Ángela Fita Boluda; 3–6, 7–5, 7–5 | (Lithuania) Klaudija Bubelytė | (Mexico) María Portillo Ramírez (Romania) Maria Toma | (Lithuania) Patricija Paukštytė (South Korea) Shin Ji-ho (Spain) Marta González Encinas (Spain) Claudia Hoste Ferrer |
| April 3 | Telde, Spain; Clay; W15; Singles and doubles draws | (Spain) Marta González Encinas (United States) Amy Zhu; 6–7^{(5–7)}, 6–3, [10–8] | (Spain) Claudia Hoste Ferrer (Czech Republic) Aneta Laboutková | (Mexico) María Portillo Ramírez (Romania) Maria Toma | (Lithuania) Patricija Paukštytė (South Korea) Shin Ji-ho (Spain) Marta González Encinas (Spain) Claudia Hoste Ferrer |
| April 3 | Monastir, Tunisia; Hard; W15; Singles and doubles draws | (Serbia) Elena Milovanović; 7–6^{(7–5)}, 6–3 | (Germany) Mara Guth | (Serbia) Dejana Radanović (United Kingdom) Talia Neilson Gatenby | (France) Flavie Brugnone (Romania) Arina Vasilescu (United States) Dasha Ivanova (Belgium) Clara Vlasselaer |
| April 3 | Monastir, Tunisia; Hard; W15; Singles and doubles draws | (Serbia) Elena Milovanović (Serbia) Dejana Radanović; Walkover | (China) Wang Jiaqi (China) Yang Yidi | (Serbia) Dejana Radanović (United Kingdom) Talia Neilson Gatenby | (France) Flavie Brugnone (Romania) Arina Vasilescu (United States) Dasha Ivanova (Belgium) Clara Vlasselaer |
| April 3 | Antalya, Turkey; Clay; W15; Singles and doubles draws | (Romania) Ilinca Amariei; 6–4, 6–2 | Valeriia Olianovskaia | Daria Lodikova (Belgium) Vicky Van de Peer | (Sweden) Jacqueline Cabaj Awad (Germany) Katharina Hering (Turkey) İlay Yörük (Czech Republic) Ivana Šebestová |
| April 3 | Antalya, Turkey; Clay; W15; Singles and doubles draws | (Italy) Virginia Ferrara (Turkey) Ayşegül Mert; 7–5, 6–4 | (Czech Republic) Denise Hrdinková (Czech Republic) Ivana Šebestová | Daria Lodikova (Belgium) Vicky Van de Peer | (Sweden) Jacqueline Cabaj Awad (Germany) Katharina Hering (Turkey) İlay Yörük (Czech Republic) Ivana Šebestová |
| April 10 | Zaragoza Open; Zaragoza, Spain; Clay; W80; Singles – Doubles | (Bulgaria) Viktoriya Tomova; 4–6, 6–2, 6–3 | (Czech Republic) Tereza Martincová | (France) Jessika Ponchet (Spain) Leyre Romero Gormaz | (France) Chloé Paquet (Netherlands) Arantxa Rus (Serbia) Natalija Stevanović (Spain) Irene Burillo Escorihuela |
| April 10 | Zaragoza Open; Zaragoza, Spain; Clay; W80; Singles – Doubles | (France) Diane Parry (Netherlands) Arantxa Rus; 6–1, 4–6, [10–5] | (United States) Asia Muhammad (United Kingdom) Eden Silva | (France) Jessika Ponchet (Spain) Leyre Romero Gormaz | (France) Chloé Paquet (Netherlands) Arantxa Rus (Serbia) Natalija Stevanović (Spain) Irene Burillo Escorihuela |
| April 10 | Axion Open; Chiasso, Switzerland; Clay; W60; Singles – Doubles | Mirra Andreeva; 1–6, 7–6^{(7–3)}, 6–0 | (Switzerland) Céline Naef | (Argentina) Nadia Podoroska (France) Séléna Janicijevic | Elina Avanesyan (Romania) Alexandra Cadanțu-Ignatik (Croatia) Tena Lukas (Latvia) Darja Semeņistaja |
| April 10 | Axion Open; Chiasso, Switzerland; Clay; W60; Singles – Doubles | (United Kingdom) Emily Appleton (Germany) Julia Lohoff; 6–1, 6–2 | (Romania) Andreea Mitu (Argentina) Nadia Podoroska | (Argentina) Nadia Podoroska (France) Séléna Janicijevic | Elina Avanesyan (Romania) Alexandra Cadanțu-Ignatik (Croatia) Tena Lukas (Latvia) Darja Semeņistaja |
| April 10 | Bujumbura, Burundi; Clay; W25; Singles and doubles draws | (France) Alice Robbe; 6–1, 6–2 | (Netherlands) Jasmijn Gimbrère | (Netherlands) Stéphanie Visscher (Ukraine) Valeriya Strakhova | (Burundi) Sada Nahimana (Egypt) Yasmin Ezzat; Anna Ureke (United Kingdom) Tiffany William |
| April 10 | Bujumbura, Burundi; Clay; W25; Singles and doubles draws | (Netherlands) Jasmijn Gimbrère (Germany) Jasmin Jebawy; 6–3, 6–4 | Ksenia Laskutova (Sweden) Fanny Östlund | (Netherlands) Stéphanie Visscher (Ukraine) Valeriya Strakhova | (Burundi) Sada Nahimana (Egypt) Yasmin Ezzat; Anna Ureke (United Kingdom) Tiffany William |
| April 10 | Sharm El Sheikh, Egypt; Hard; W25; Singles and doubles draws | (Italy) Lucrezia Stefanini; 6–3, 7–6^{(7–5)} | (United States) Emina Bektas | (China) Wang Meiling; Polina Iatcenko | (Australia) Taylah Preston; Evgeniya Burdina (Hong Kong) Eudice Chong; Elena Pridankina |
| April 10 | Sharm El Sheikh, Egypt; Hard; W25; Singles and doubles draws | (United States) Emina Bektas (Hong Kong) Eudice Chong; 6–2, 6–4 | Darya Astakhova; Ekaterina Reyngold | (China) Wang Meiling; Polina Iatcenko | (Australia) Taylah Preston; Evgeniya Burdina (Hong Kong) Eudice Chong; Elena Pridankina |
| April 10 | Santa Margherita di Pula, Italy; Clay; W25; Singles and doubles draws | (Romania) Andreea Prisăcariu; 3–6, 6–2, 6–2 | (Romania) Miriam Bulgaru | (Belgium) Sofia Costoulas (France) Alice Ramé | (Germany) Katharina Hobgarski (Italy) Federica Bilardo (Italy) Lisa Pigato (Turkey) Ayla Aksu |
| April 10 | Santa Margherita di Pula, Italy; Clay; W25; Singles and doubles draws | (Croatia) Mariana Dražić; Anastasia Gasanova; 7–5, 6–4 | (Kazakhstan) Zhibek Kulambayeva (Greece) Sapfo Sakellaridi | (Belgium) Sofia Costoulas (France) Alice Ramé | (Germany) Katharina Hobgarski (Italy) Federica Bilardo (Italy) Lisa Pigato (Turkey) Ayla Aksu |
| April 10 | Osaka, Japan; Hard; W25; Singles and doubles draws | (Australia) Maddison Inglis; 6–3, 7–6^{(7–2)} | (South Korea) Han Na-lae | (Japan) Kyōka Okamura (China) You Xiaodi | (South Korea) Jang Su-jeong (Australia) Alexandra Bozovic (Spain) Georgina García Pérez (Japan) Haruka Kaji |
| April 10 | Osaka, Japan; Hard; W25; Singles and doubles draws | (Australia) Alexandra Bozovic (Australia) Petra Hule; 6–2, 6–3 | (Chinese Taipei) Lee Pei-chi (Chinese Taipei) Lee Ya-hsuan | (Japan) Kyōka Okamura (China) You Xiaodi | (South Korea) Jang Su-jeong (Australia) Alexandra Bozovic (Spain) Georgina García Pérez (Japan) Haruka Kaji |
| April 10 | Boca Raton, United States; Clay; W25; Singles and doubles draws | (United States) Caroline Dolehide; 6–4, 6–4 | (United States) Hailey Baptiste | (Romania) Gabriela Lee (United States) Sachia Vickery | (United States) Emma Navarro (United States) Katrina Scott (Ukraine) Yulia Starodubtseva (Poland) Katarzyna Kawa |
| April 10 | Boca Raton, United States; Clay; W25; Singles and doubles draws | (United States) Makenna Jones (United States) Jamie Loeb; 5–7, 6–3, [10–8] | (United States) Sofia Sewing (Hungary) Fanny Stollár | (Romania) Gabriela Lee (United States) Sachia Vickery | (United States) Emma Navarro (United States) Katrina Scott (Ukraine) Yulia Starodubtseva (Poland) Katarzyna Kawa |
| April 10 | Telde, Spain; Clay; W15; Singles and doubles draws | (Italy) Laura Mair; 7–5, 6–2 | (Ukraine) Oleksandra Oliynykova | (China) Mi Tianmi (Italy) Alessandra Mazzola | (Italy) Chiara Girelli (Spain) Paula Arias Manjón (France) Schena Benamar (France) Laïa Petretic |
| April 10 | Telde, Spain; Clay; W15; Singles and doubles draws | (China) Mi Tianmi (South Korea) Shin Ji-ho; 6–4, 6–3 | (Italy) Giulia Crescenzi (Switzerland) Marie Mettraux | (China) Mi Tianmi (Italy) Alessandra Mazzola | (Italy) Chiara Girelli (Spain) Paula Arias Manjón (France) Schena Benamar (France) Laïa Petretic |
| April 10 | Monastir, Tunisia; Hard; W15; Singles and doubles draws | (United States) Jenna DeFalco; 6–2, 6–0 | (Romania) Arina Vasilescu | (Spain) Yvonne Cavallé Reimers (China) Wang Jiaqi | (Germany) Selina Dal (France) Esther Bataille (France) Nina Radovanovic (Sweden) Julita Saner |
| April 10 | Monastir, Tunisia; Hard; W15; Singles and doubles draws | (Switzerland) Naïma Karamoko (France) Nina Radovanovic; 7–5, 6–4 | (Spain) Yvonne Cavallé Reimers (United States) Teja Tirunelveli | (Spain) Yvonne Cavallé Reimers (China) Wang Jiaqi | (Germany) Selina Dal (France) Esther Bataille (France) Nina Radovanovic (Sweden) Julita Saner |
| April 10 | Antalya, Turkey; Clay; W15; Singles and doubles draws | (Belgium) Vicky Van de Peer; 3–6, 6–3, 6–2 | (Greece) Michaela Laki | Valeriia Olianovskaia (Romania) Ilinca Amariei | (Czech Republic) Julie Štruplová; Anastasiia Gureva; Alevtina Ibragimova (Germany) Fabienne Gettwart |
| April 10 | Antalya, Turkey; Clay; W15; Singles and doubles draws | (Germany) Katharina Hering (Germany) Natalia Siedliska; 6–2, 7–5 | (Ukraine) Kateryna Diatlova (Romania) Ștefana Lazăr | Valeriia Olianovskaia (Romania) Ilinca Amariei | (Czech Republic) Julie Štruplová; Anastasiia Gureva; Alevtina Ibragimova (Germany) Fabienne Gettwart |
| April 17 | Oeiras Ladies Open; Oeiras, Portugal; Clay; W100; Singles – Doubles | (Montenegro) Danka Kovinić; 6–2, 6–2 | (Spain) Rebeka Masarova | (Spain) Sara Sorribes Tormo (Egypt) Mayar Sherif | (Czech Republic) Marie Bouzková; Erika Andreeva (Japan) Moyuka Uchijima (Denmark) Clara Tauson |
| April 17 | Oeiras Ladies Open; Oeiras, Portugal; Clay; W100; Singles – Doubles | (Norway) Ulrikke Eikeri (Japan) Eri Hozumi; 4–6, 6–4, [10–5] | (Portugal) Francisca Jorge (Portugal) Matilde Jorge | (Spain) Sara Sorribes Tormo (Egypt) Mayar Sherif | (Czech Republic) Marie Bouzková; Erika Andreeva (Japan) Moyuka Uchijima (Denmark) Clara Tauson |
| April 17 | LTP Charleston Pro Tennis; Charleston, United States; Clay; W100; Singles – Doubles | (United States) Emma Navarro; 2–6, 6–2, 7–5 | (United States) Peyton Stearns | (United States) Caroline Dolehide (United States) Madison Brengle | (United States) Chloe Beck (Japan) Nao Hibino (China) Yuan Yue (Australia) Storm Hunter |
| April 17 | LTP Charleston Pro Tennis; Charleston, United States; Clay; W100; Singles – Doubles | (United States) Sophie Chang (United States) Angela Kulikov; 6–3, 6–4 | (United States) Ashlyn Krueger (United States) Robin Montgomery | (United States) Caroline Dolehide (United States) Madison Brengle | (United States) Chloe Beck (Japan) Nao Hibino (China) Yuan Yue (Australia) Storm Hunter |
| April 17 | Koper Open; Koper, Slovenia; Clay; W60; Singles – Doubles | (Spain) Aliona Bolsova; 3–6, 6–2, 4–1 ret. | (Romania) Irina Bara | (Romania) Jaqueline Cristian (Romania) Andreea Mitu | Kristina Dmitruk (Hungary) Réka Luca Jani (Germany) Silvia Ambrosio (Spain) Jéssica Bouzas Maneiro |
| April 17 | Koper Open; Koper, Slovenia; Clay; W60; Singles – Doubles | (Romania) Irina Bara (Romania) Andreea Mitu; 6–2, 6–3 | (Netherlands) Suzan Lamens (Australia) Kaylah McPhee | (Romania) Jaqueline Cristian (Romania) Andreea Mitu | Kristina Dmitruk (Hungary) Réka Luca Jani (Germany) Silvia Ambrosio (Spain) Jéssica Bouzas Maneiro |
| April 17 | Bellinzona Ladies Open; Bellinzona, Switzerland; Clay; W60; Singles – Doubles | Mirra Andreeva; 2–6, 6–1, 6–4 | (France) Fiona Ferro | (Switzerland) Céline Naef (Serbia) Natalija Stevanović | (Belgium) Marie Benoît (Turkey) Zeynep Sönmez (Cyprus) Raluca Șerban (Czech Republic) Barbora Palicová |
| April 17 | Bellinzona Ladies Open; Bellinzona, Switzerland; Clay; W60; Singles – Doubles | (Switzerland) Conny Perrin (Czech Republic) Anna Sisková; 3–6, 7–6^{(11–9)}, [10–5] | (United Kingdom) Freya Christie (United Kingdom) Ali Collins | (Switzerland) Céline Naef (Serbia) Natalija Stevanović | (Belgium) Marie Benoît (Turkey) Zeynep Sönmez (Cyprus) Raluca Șerban (Czech Republic) Barbora Palicová |
| April 17 | Guayaquil, Ecuador; Clay; W25; Singles and doubles draws | (Argentina) Julia Riera; 6–2, 7–5 | (United Kingdom) Francesca Jones | (Argentina) Solana Sierra (China) You Xiaodi | (Australia) Seone Mendez (Latvia) Daniela Vismane (France) Marine Partaud (Indonesia) Priska Madelyn Nugroho |
| April 17 | Guayaquil, Ecuador; Clay; W25; Singles and doubles draws | (United States) Jessie Aney (United States) Sofia Sewing; 6–0, 6–2 | (Spain) Noelia Bouzó Zanotti (Bulgaria) Ani Vangelova | (Argentina) Solana Sierra (China) You Xiaodi | (Australia) Seone Mendez (Latvia) Daniela Vismane (France) Marine Partaud (Indonesia) Priska Madelyn Nugroho |
| April 17 | Sharm El Sheikh, Egypt; Hard; W25; Singles and doubles draws | (Hungary) Tímea Babos; 6–4, 6–1 | Maria Timofeeva | (Czech Republic) Linda Klimovičová (Romania) Elena-Teodora Cadar | (Egypt) Sandra Samir (Poland) Martyna Kubka (United Kingdom) Anna Brogan (Slovakia) Rebecca Šramková |
| April 17 | Sharm El Sheikh, Egypt; Hard; W25; Singles and doubles draws | (China) Gao Xinyu (China) Wang Meiling; 6–3, 6–2 | Aglaya Fedorova; Darya Shauha | (Czech Republic) Linda Klimovičová (Romania) Elena-Teodora Cadar | (Egypt) Sandra Samir (Poland) Martyna Kubka (United Kingdom) Anna Brogan (Slovakia) Rebecca Šramková |
| April 17 | Nottingham, United Kingdom; Hard; W25; Singles and doubles draws | (Australia) Arina Rodionova; 6–2, 6–1 | (Netherlands) Arianne Hartono | (United Kingdom) Katy Dunne (Hong Kong) Adithya Karunaratne | (United Kingdom) Hannah Klugman (United Kingdom) Naiktha Bains (Estonia) Elena Malõgina (France) Manon Léonard |
| April 17 | Nottingham, United Kingdom; Hard; W25; Singles and doubles draws | (United Kingdom) Naiktha Bains (United Kingdom) Maia Lumsden; 6–1, 6–4 | (India) Rutuja Bhosale (India) Ankita Raina | (United Kingdom) Katy Dunne (Hong Kong) Adithya Karunaratne | (United Kingdom) Hannah Klugman (United Kingdom) Naiktha Bains (Estonia) Elena Malõgina (France) Manon Léonard |
| April 17 | Santa Margherita di Pula, Italy; Clay; W25; Singles and doubles draws | (France) Sara Cakarevic; 6–2, 6–4 | (Ukraine) Katarina Zavatska | (Bosnia and Herzegovina) Dea Herdželaš (United Kingdom) Sonay Kartal | Ekaterina Makarova (Sweden) Kajsa Rinaldo Persson (Netherlands) Eva Vedder; Anastasia Gasanova |
| April 17 | Santa Margherita di Pula, Italy; Clay; W25; Singles and doubles draws | (Japan) Misaki Matsuda (Japan) Ikumi Yamazaki; 4–6, 6–2, [11–9] | (Canada) Bianca Fernandez (United States) Chiara Scholl | (Bosnia and Herzegovina) Dea Herdželaš (United Kingdom) Sonay Kartal | Ekaterina Makarova (Sweden) Kajsa Rinaldo Persson (Netherlands) Eva Vedder; Anastasia Gasanova |
| April 17 | Zephyrhills, United States; Clay; W25; Singles and doubles draws | (United States) Makenna Jones; 5–7, 6–4, 6–1 | (United States) Hanna Chang | (United States) Allura Zamarripa (Hungary) Fanny Stollár | (Romania) Oana Georgeta Simion (Switzerland) Susan Bandecchi (Ukraine) Yulia Starodubtseva (United States) Francesca Di Lorenzo |
| April 17 | Zephyrhills, United States; Clay; W25; Singles and doubles draws | Maria Kononova (Ukraine) Yulia Starodubtseva; 7–5, 6–3 | (United States) Jada Hart (United States) Rasheeda McAdoo | (United States) Allura Zamarripa (Hungary) Fanny Stollár | (Romania) Oana Georgeta Simion (Switzerland) Susan Bandecchi (Ukraine) Yulia Starodubtseva (United States) Francesca Di Lorenzo |
| April 17 | Osaka, Japan; Hard; W15; Singles and doubles draws | (Japan) Natsumi Kawaguchi; 6–4, 6–1 | (Japan) Miho Kuramochi | (Japan) Aoi Ito (Japan) Ayano Shimizu | (Japan) Eri Shimizu (Japan) Mayuka Aikawa (South Korea) Lee Eun-hye (Chinese Taipei) Lee Ya-hsuan |
| April 17 | Osaka, Japan; Hard; W15; Singles and doubles draws | (Japan) Aoi Ito (Japan) Mio Mushika; 6–4, 6–7^{(5–7)}, [10–6] | (South Korea) Choi Ji-hee (Chinese Taipei) Lee Ya-hsuan | (Japan) Aoi Ito (Japan) Ayano Shimizu | (Japan) Eri Shimizu (Japan) Mayuka Aikawa (South Korea) Lee Eun-hye (Chinese Taipei) Lee Ya-hsuan |
| April 17 | Kuršumlijska Banja, Serbia; Clay; W15; Singles and doubles draws | (Switzerland) Leonie Küng; 7–6^{(9–7)}, 6–1 | (Romania) Lavinia Tănăsie | Ksenia Laskutova; Evialina Laskevich | (Italy) Sofia Rocchetti (Greece) Dimitra Pavlou (Serbia) Bojana Marinković; Anastasia Sukhotina |
| April 17 | Kuršumlijska Banja, Serbia; Clay; W15; Singles and doubles draws | (Slovakia) Katarína Kužmová; Ksenia Laskutova; 7–5, 6–3 | (Switzerland) Leonie Küng (Serbia) Bojana Marinković | Ksenia Laskutova; Evialina Laskevich | (Italy) Sofia Rocchetti (Greece) Dimitra Pavlou (Serbia) Bojana Marinković; Anastasia Sukhotina |
| April 17 | Telde, Spain; Clay; W15; Singles and doubles draws | (Ukraine) Oleksandra Oliynykova; 6–3, 6–1 | (Lithuania) Klaudija Bubelytė | (France) Astrid Lew Yan Foon (South Korea) Shin Ji-ho | (Mexico) María Portillo Ramírez (Spain) Marta Soriano Santiago (Italy) Martina Caregaro (Austria) Arabella Koller |
| April 17 | Telde, Spain; Clay; W15; Singles and doubles draws | (Italy) Giulia Crescenzi (Switzerland) Marie Mettraux; 2–6, 7–5, [10–7] | (United Kingdom) Abigail Amos (Austria) Arabella Koller | (France) Astrid Lew Yan Foon (South Korea) Shin Ji-ho | (Mexico) María Portillo Ramírez (Spain) Marta Soriano Santiago (Italy) Martina Caregaro (Austria) Arabella Koller |
| April 17 | Monastir, Tunisia; Hard; W15; Singles and doubles draws | (France) Nina Radovanovic; 7–5, 7–5 | (United States) Jenna DeFalco | (Spain) Yvonne Cavallé Reimers (Ukraine) Kateryna Lazarenko | (China) Wang Jiaqi (France) Maëlle Leclercq (Germany) Selina Dal (France) Alyssa Réguer |
| April 17 | Monastir, Tunisia; Hard; W15; Singles and doubles draws | (France) Astrid Cirotte (China) Wang Jiaqi; Walkover | (Spain) Yvonne Cavallé Reimers (United States) Teja Tirunelveli | (Spain) Yvonne Cavallé Reimers (Ukraine) Kateryna Lazarenko | (China) Wang Jiaqi (France) Maëlle Leclercq (Germany) Selina Dal (France) Alyssa Réguer |
| April 17 | Antalya, Turkey; Clay; W15; Singles and doubles draws | (Czech Republic) Julie Štruplová; 6–7^{(2–7)}, 6–1, 6–2 | (Turkey) İlay Yörük | Diana Demidova (Belgium) Lara Salden | (Greece) Michaela Laki (Germany) Fabienne Gettwart (Germany) Natalia Siedliska; Anastasiia Gureva |
| April 17 | Antalya, Turkey; Clay; W15; Singles and doubles draws | (Germany) Katharina Hering (Germany) Natalia Siedliska; 6–3, 6–2 | (Turkey) Başak Eraydın (Germany) Sonja Zhiyenbayeva | Diana Demidova (Belgium) Lara Salden | (Greece) Michaela Laki (Germany) Fabienne Gettwart (Germany) Natalia Siedliska; Anastasiia Gureva |
| April 24 | Boar's Head Resort Women's Open; Charlottesville, United States; Clay; W60; Singles – Doubles | (United States) Emma Navarro; 6–1, 6–1 | (United States) Ashlyn Krueger | (United States) Caroline Dolehide (United States) Grace Min | Diana Shnaider (Mexico) Renata Zarazúa (United States) Kayla Day (Argentina) María Lourdes Carlé |
| April 24 | Boar's Head Resort Women's Open; Charlottesville, United States; Clay; W60; Singles – Doubles | (United States) Sophie Chang (China) Yuan Yue; 6–3, 6–3 | (Japan) Nao Hibino (Hungary) Fanny Stollár | (United States) Caroline Dolehide (United States) Grace Min | Diana Shnaider (Mexico) Renata Zarazúa (United States) Kayla Day (Argentina) María Lourdes Carlé |
| April 24 | Edge Istanbul; Istanbul, Turkey; Clay; W60; Singles – Doubles | (Romania) Irina Bara; 6–7^{(2–7)}, 6–4, 6–1 | (Turkey) Berfu Cengiz | (Turkey) İlay Yörük; Darya Astakhova | Ekaterina Maklakova; Ekaterina Makarova (Turkey) Zeynep Sönmez (Czech Republic) Sára Bejlek |
| April 24 | Edge Istanbul; Istanbul, Turkey; Clay; W60; Singles – Doubles | (Slovenia) Dalila Jakupović; Irina Khromacheva; 7–6^{(7–3)}, 6–4 | (Australia) Priscilla Hon (Ukraine) Valeriya Strakhova | (Turkey) İlay Yörük; Darya Astakhova | Ekaterina Maklakova; Ekaterina Makarova (Turkey) Zeynep Sönmez (Czech Republic) Sára Bejlek |
| April 24 | Oeiras CETO Open; Oeiras, Portugal; Clay; W60; Singles – Doubles | (Uzbekistan) Nigina Abduraimova; 1–6, 6–4, 6–3 | (Portugal) Francisca Jorge | (Belgium) Greet Minnen (Mexico) Fernanda Contreras Gómez | Yuliya Hatouka (Lithuania) Justina Mikulskytė (France) Elsa Jacquemot (United States) Asia Muhammad |
| April 24 | Oeiras CETO Open; Oeiras, Portugal; Clay; W60; Singles – Doubles | (Mexico) Fernanda Contreras Gómez (Brazil) Ingrid Gamarra Martins; 6–3, 6–2 | (Czech Republic) Jesika Malečková (Czech Republic) Renata Voráčová | (Belgium) Greet Minnen (Mexico) Fernanda Contreras Gómez | Yuliya Hatouka (Lithuania) Justina Mikulskytė (France) Elsa Jacquemot (United States) Asia Muhammad |
| April 24 | Calvi, France; Hard; W40+H; Singles and doubles draws | (Italy) Lucrezia Stefanini; 6–2, 3–6, 6–3 | (United Kingdom) Heather Watson | (France) Jessika Ponchet (France) Harmony Tan | Valeria Savinykh (United Kingdom) Harriet Dart (Ukraine) Daria Snigur (United Kingdom) Naiktha Bains |
| April 24 | Calvi, France; Hard; W40+H; Singles and doubles draws | (United Kingdom) Naiktha Bains (United Kingdom) Maia Lumsden; 6–4, 3–6, [10–7] | (France) Estelle Cascino (India) Ankita Raina | (France) Jessika Ponchet (France) Harmony Tan | Valeria Savinykh (United Kingdom) Harriet Dart (Ukraine) Daria Snigur (United Kingdom) Naiktha Bains |
| April 24 | Guayaquil, Ecuador; Clay; W25; Singles and doubles draws | (Argentina) Julia Riera; 6–4, 4–6, 6–4 | (Argentina) Solana Sierra | (Australia) Seone Mendez (United Kingdom) Francesca Jones | (Bolivia) Noelia Zeballos (Latvia) Daniela Vismane (Argentina) Martina Capurro Taborda (United States) Sofia Sewing |
| April 24 | Guayaquil, Ecuador; Clay; W25; Singles and doubles draws | (United States) Jessie Aney (United States) Sofia Sewing; 6–1, 6–2 | (Brazil) Ana Candiotto (Brazil) Rebeca Pereira | (Australia) Seone Mendez (United Kingdom) Francesca Jones | (Bolivia) Noelia Zeballos (Latvia) Daniela Vismane (Argentina) Martina Capurro Taborda (United States) Sofia Sewing |
| April 24 | Nottingham, United Kingdom; Hard; W25; Singles and doubles draws | (Australia) Arina Rodionova; 6–4, 4–6, 6–2 | (United Kingdom) Amarni Banks | (India) Rutuja Bhosale (United Kingdom) Emily Appleton | (Denmark) Johanne Svendsen (Latvia) Diāna Marcinkēviča (Slovakia) Viktória Morvayová (United Kingdom) Lauryn John-Baptiste |
| April 24 | Nottingham, United Kingdom; Hard; W25; Singles and doubles draws | (United Kingdom) Emily Appleton (United Kingdom) Lauryn John-Baptiste; 6–4, 6–3 | (India) Rutuja Bhosale (Netherlands) Arianne Hartono | (India) Rutuja Bhosale (United Kingdom) Emily Appleton | (Denmark) Johanne Svendsen (Latvia) Diāna Marcinkēviča (Slovakia) Viktória Morvayová (United Kingdom) Lauryn John-Baptiste |
| April 24 | Osijek, Croatia; Clay; W25; Singles and doubles draws | (Slovenia) Veronika Erjavec; 7–5, 6–2 | (Croatia) Tena Lukas | (Croatia) Antonia Ružić (Czech Republic) Dominika Šalková | (Czech Republic) Lucie Havlíčková (Germany) Silvia Ambrosio (China) Bai Zhuoxuan (Croatia) Petra Marčinko |
| April 24 | Osijek, Croatia; Clay; W25; Singles and doubles draws | (Czech Republic) Dominika Šalková (Czech Republic) Julie Štruplová; 6–3, 6–4 | (Czech Republic) Denisa Hindová (Czech Republic) Karolína Kubáňová | (Croatia) Antonia Ružić (Czech Republic) Dominika Šalková | (Czech Republic) Lucie Havlíčková (Germany) Silvia Ambrosio (China) Bai Zhuoxuan (Croatia) Petra Marčinko |
| April 24 | Santa Margherita de Pula, Italy; Clay; W25; Singles and doubles draws | (Czech Republic) Nikola Bartůňková; 6–0, 7–5 | (Switzerland) Ylena In-Albon | (Germany) Anne Schäfer (Liechtenstein) Kathinka von Deichmann | (Bosnia and Herzegovina) Dea Herdželaš (Italy) Federica Bilardo (Poland) Weronika Falkowska (Switzerland) Nadine Keller |
| April 24 | Santa Margherita de Pula, Italy; Clay; W25; Singles and doubles draws | (Italy) Alessandra Teodosescu (Italy) Federica Urgesi; 6–4, 6–3 | (Belgium) Marie Benoît (Bosnia and Herzegovina) Dea Herdželaš | (Germany) Anne Schäfer (Liechtenstein) Kathinka von Deichmann | (Bosnia and Herzegovina) Dea Herdželaš (Italy) Federica Bilardo (Poland) Weronika Falkowska (Switzerland) Nadine Keller |
| April 24 | Antalya, Turkey; Clay; W15; Singles and doubles draws | Diana Demidova; 6–4, 6–3 | (Italy) Miriana Tona | Valeriya Yushchenko (Belgium) Lara Salden | Uladzislava Zvereva (Switzerland) Alina Granwehr (Turkey) Doğa Türkmen (Romania) Evelyne Tiron |
| April 24 | Antalya, Turkey; Clay; W15; Singles and doubles draws | (Netherlands) Merel Hoedt (Italy) Miriana Tona; 6–4, 6–4 | (Kazakhstan) Asylzhan Arystanbekova (Kazakhstan) Dana Baidaulet | Valeriya Yushchenko (Belgium) Lara Salden | Uladzislava Zvereva (Switzerland) Alina Granwehr (Turkey) Doğa Türkmen (Romania) Evelyne Tiron |
| April 24 | Fukui, Japan; Hard; W15; Singles and doubles draws | (Japan) Miho Kuramochi; 7–5, 3–0 ret. | (Chinese Taipei) Lee Ya-hsuan | (Japan) Rinon Okuwaki (Japan) Himari Sato | (Japan) Honoka Kobayashi (Japan) Aoi Ito (Japan) Rinko Matsuda (Japan) Lisa-Marie Rioux |
| April 24 | Fukui, Japan; Hard; W15; Singles and doubles draws | (Chinese Taipei) Li Yu-yun (Japan) Rinon Okuwaki; 3–6, 6–4, [10–8] | (Japan) Erina Hayashi (Japan) Kisa Yoshioka | (Japan) Rinon Okuwaki (Japan) Himari Sato | (Japan) Honoka Kobayashi (Japan) Aoi Ito (Japan) Rinko Matsuda (Japan) Lisa-Marie Rioux |
| April 24 | Kuršumlijska Banja, Serbia; Clay; W15; Singles and doubles draws | (Switzerland) Leonie Küng; 6–3, 6–2 | (Romania) Lavinia Tănăsie | (Italy) Sofia Rocchetti; Evialina Laskevich | (Italy) Matilde Mariani (Serbia) Lara Stojanovski (Greece) Dimitra Pavlou (Bosnia and Herzegovina) Suana Tucaković |
| April 24 | Kuršumlijska Banja, Serbia; Clay; W15; Singles and doubles draws | (Netherlands) Madelief Hageman (Sweden) Maja Radenković; 6–3, 4–6, [10–6] | (Slovakia) Laura Cíleková; Evialina Laskevich | (Italy) Sofia Rocchetti; Evialina Laskevich | (Italy) Matilde Mariani (Serbia) Lara Stojanovski (Greece) Dimitra Pavlou (Bosnia and Herzegovina) Suana Tucaković |
| April 24 | Monastir, Tunisia; Hard; W15; Singles and doubles draws | (Bulgaria) Isabella Shinikova; 3–6, 6–4, 6–1 | (Australia) Lisa Mays | (Slovakia) Salma Drugdová (Serbia) Elena Milovanović | (Ukraine) Kateryna Lazarenko (Germany) Selina Dal (France) Emmanuelle Girard (India) Vaishnavi Adkar |
| April 24 | Monastir, Tunisia; Hard; W15; Singles and doubles draws | (Australia) Lily Fairclough (Australia) Lisa Mays; 5–7, 6–2, [10–4] | (Netherlands) Demi Tran (Netherlands) Lian Tran | (Slovakia) Salma Drugdová (Serbia) Elena Milovanović | (Ukraine) Kateryna Lazarenko (Germany) Selina Dal (France) Emmanuelle Girard (India) Vaishnavi Adkar |
| April 24 | Telde, Spain; Clay; W15; Singles and doubles draws | (Spain) Paula Arias Manjón; 7–5, 6–4 | (Australia) Kaylah McPhee | (Chile) Jimar Geraldine Gerald González (Switzerland) Marie Mettraux | (Italy) Martina Caregaro (United States) Amy Zhu (United Kingdom) Abigail Amos (France) Laïa Petretic |
| April 24 | Telde, Spain; Clay; W15; Singles and doubles draws | (Australia) Kaylah McPhee (Switzerland) Marie Mettraux; 7–5, 6–2 | (Slovakia) Irina Balus (Lithuania) Patricija Paukštytė | (Chile) Jimar Geraldine Gerald González (Switzerland) Marie Mettraux | (Italy) Martina Caregaro (United States) Amy Zhu (United Kingdom) Abigail Amos (France) Laïa Petretic |

=== May ===
| Week of | Tournament | Winner | Runners-up | Semifinalists | Quarterfinalists |
|---|---|---|---|---|---|
| May 1 | FineMark Women's Pro Tennis Championship; Bonita Springs, United States; Clay; W100; Singles – Doubles | (United States) Kayla Day; 6–2, 6–2 | (United States) Ann Li | (Australia) Astra Sharma (United States) Caroline Dolehide | (Mexico) Renata Zarazúa (United States) Sachia Vickery (United States) Kaitlin Quevedo (Mexico) Marcela Zacarías |
| May 1 | FineMark Women's Pro Tennis Championship; Bonita Springs, United States; Clay; W100; Singles – Doubles | (United States) Makenna Jones (United States) Jamie Loeb; 5–7, 6–4, [10–2] | (United States) Ashlyn Krueger (United States) Robin Montgomery | (Australia) Astra Sharma (United States) Caroline Dolehide | (Mexico) Renata Zarazúa (United States) Sachia Vickery (United States) Kaitlin Quevedo (Mexico) Marcela Zacarías |
| May 1 | Wiesbaden Tennis Open; Germany; Clay; W100; Singles – Doubles | Elina Avanesyan; 6–2, 6–0 | (Australia) Jaimee Fourlis | (Austria) Sinja Kraus (Switzerland) Simona Waltert | (Slovenia) Dalila Jakupović (Australia) Olivia Gadecki (France) Loïs Boisson (Australia) Kimberly Birrell |
| May 1 | Wiesbaden Tennis Open; Germany; Clay; W100; Singles – Doubles | (Australia) Jaimee Fourlis (Australia) Olivia Gadecki; 6–1, 6–4 | (United Kingdom) Emily Appleton (Germany) Julia Lohoff | (Austria) Sinja Kraus (Switzerland) Simona Waltert | (Slovenia) Dalila Jakupović (Australia) Olivia Gadecki (France) Loïs Boisson (Australia) Kimberly Birrell |
| May 1 | Kangaroo Cup; Gifu, Japan; Hard; W80; Singles – Doubles | (Japan) Himeno Sakatsume; 7–5, 6–3 | (United Kingdom) Katie Boulter | (South Korea) Jang Su-jeong (Chinese Taipei) Lee Ya-hsuan | (Japan) Rina Saigo (Japan) Haruka Kaji (Japan) Sara Saito (Japan) Mai Hontama |
| May 1 | Kangaroo Cup; Gifu, Japan; Hard; W80; Singles – Doubles | (South Korea) Han Na-Lae (South Korea) Jang Su-jeong; 7–6^{(7–3)}, 2–6, [10–8] | (Chinese Taipei) Lee Ya-hsuan (Chinese Taipei) Wu Fang-hsien | (South Korea) Jang Su-jeong (Chinese Taipei) Lee Ya-hsuan | (Japan) Rina Saigo (Japan) Haruka Kaji (Japan) Sara Saito (Japan) Mai Hontama |
| May 1 | Advantage Cars Prague Open; Prague, Czechia; Clay; W60; Singles – Doubles | (Latvia) Darja Semeņistaja; 2–6, 6–3, 6–4 | (Spain) Jéssica Bouzas Maneiro | (Croatia) Tena Lukas (Czech Republic) Nikola Bartůňková | (Burundi) Sada Nahimana (Slovakia) Rebecca Šramková (Romania) Ilinca Amariei (Australia) Priscilla Hon |
| May 1 | Advantage Cars Prague Open; Prague, Czechia; Clay; W60; Singles – Doubles | (Poland) Maja Chwalińska (Czech Republic) Jesika Malečková; 6–0, 7–6^{(7–5)} | (Czech Republic) Aneta Kučmová (Australia) Kaylah McPhee | (Croatia) Tena Lukas (Czech Republic) Nikola Bartůňková | (Burundi) Sada Nahimana (Slovakia) Rebecca Šramková (Romania) Ilinca Amariei (Australia) Priscilla Hon |
| May 1 | Tbilisi, Georgia; Hard; W40; Singles and doubles draws | (Canada) Stacey Fung; 6–4, ret. | Vitalia Diatchenko | (India) Ankita Raina (Serbia) Dejana Radanović | (India) Sahaja Yamalapalli (Georgia (country)) Ekaterine Gorgodze; Valeria Savinykh; Elena Pridankina |
| May 1 | Tbilisi, Georgia; Hard; W40; Singles and doubles draws | (Georgia (country)) Ekaterine Gorgodze (India) Ankita Raina; 4–6, 6–2, [10–6] | Anastasia Zakharova; Anastasia Zolotareva | (India) Ankita Raina (Serbia) Dejana Radanović | (India) Sahaja Yamalapalli (Georgia (country)) Ekaterine Gorgodze; Valeria Savinykh; Elena Pridankina |
| May 1 | Tossa de Mar, Spain; Carpet; W25+H; Singles and doubles draws | (Malta) Francesca Curmi; 6–2, 7–6^{(7–2)} | (Spain) Georgina García Pérez | (Ukraine) Daria Snigur (Italy) Federica di Sarra | (Serbia) Mihaela Djaković (France) Nahia Berecoechea (France) Lucie Nguyen Tan; Maria Bondarenko |
| May 1 | Tossa de Mar, Spain; Carpet; W25+H; Singles and doubles draws | (Spain) Georgina García Pérez (Switzerland) Conny Perrin; 4–6, 6–3, [10–7] | (Greece) Martha Matoula (Romania) Arina Vasilescu | (Ukraine) Daria Snigur (Italy) Federica di Sarra | (Serbia) Mihaela Djaković (France) Nahia Berecoechea (France) Lucie Nguyen Tan; Maria Bondarenko |
| May 1 | Alaminos-Larnaca, Cyprus; Clay; W25; Singles and doubles draws | (Hungary) Tímea Babos; 6–4, 5–7, 7–6^{(7–5)} | (Cyprus) Raluca Șerban | (Italy) Miriana Tona (Germany) Silvia Ambrosio | (Belgium) Amelie Van Impe (Italy) Giorgia Pinto (France) Emma Léné (Hungary) Natália Szabanin |
| May 1 | Alaminos-Larnaca, Cyprus; Clay; W25; Singles and doubles draws | (Germany) Luisa Meyer auf der Heide (Italy) Miriana Tona; 7–5, 6–4 | (Cyprus) Raluca Șerban (Cyprus) Maria Siopacha | (Italy) Miriana Tona (Germany) Silvia Ambrosio | (Belgium) Amelie Van Impe (Italy) Giorgia Pinto (France) Emma Léné (Hungary) Natália Szabanin |
| May 1 | Nottingham, United Kingdom; Hard; W25; Singles and doubles draws | (United Kingdom) Harriet Dart; 6–0, 6–2 | (Australia) Taylah Preston | (Australia) Arina Rodionova (Romania) Elena-Teodora Cadar | (France) Julie Belgraver (United Kingdom) Eliz Maloney (United Kingdom) Lauryn John-Baptiste (Belgium) Clara Vlasselaer |
| May 1 | Nottingham, United Kingdom; Hard; W25; Singles and doubles draws | (United Kingdom) Naiktha Bains (United Kingdom) Maia Lumsden; 4–6, 6–4, [10–6] | (China) Lu Jiajing (Estonia) Elena Malõgina | (Australia) Arina Rodionova (Romania) Elena-Teodora Cadar | (France) Julie Belgraver (United Kingdom) Eliz Maloney (United Kingdom) Lauryn John-Baptiste (Belgium) Clara Vlasselaer |
| May 1 | Santa Margherita di Pula, Italy; Clay; W25; Singles and doubles draws | (Greece) Valentini Grammatikopoulou; 6–4, 6–1 | (Liechtenstein) Kathinka von Deichmann | (Andorra) Victoria Jiménez Kasintseva (Italy) Federica Bilardo | (Canada) Bianca Fernandez (Italy) Virginia Ferrara (Romania) Oana Gavrilă (Italy) Anastasia Abbagnato |
| May 1 | Santa Margherita di Pula, Italy; Clay; W25; Singles and doubles draws | (Romania) Oana Gavrilă (Greece) Sapfo Sakellaridi; 6–1, 6–1 | (Netherlands) Lexie Stevens (Bosnia and Herzegovina) Anita Wagner | (Andorra) Victoria Jiménez Kasintseva (Italy) Federica Bilardo | (Canada) Bianca Fernandez (Italy) Virginia Ferrara (Romania) Oana Gavrilă (Italy) Anastasia Abbagnato |
| May 1 | Kuršumlijska Banja, Serbia; Clay; W15; Singles and doubles draws | (China) Wang Meiling; 6–2, 7–6^{(8–6)} | (Slovenia) Živa Falkner | (Sweden) Maja Radenkovic; Evialina Laskevich | (Netherlands) Madelief Hageman (Italy) Matilde Mariani (Greece) Elena Korokozidi (Serbia) Natalija Senić |
| May 1 | Kuršumlijska Banja, Serbia; Clay; W15; Singles and doubles draws | (Latvia) Margarita Ignatjeva; Anastasia Sukhotina; 7–5, 6–1 | (Australia) Elena Micic (Serbia) Anja Stanković | (Sweden) Maja Radenkovic; Evialina Laskevich | (Netherlands) Madelief Hageman (Italy) Matilde Mariani (Greece) Elena Korokozidi (Serbia) Natalija Senić |
| May 1 | Monastir, Tunisia; Hard; W15; Singles and doubles draws | (Bulgaria) Julia Stamatova; 6–3, 7–6^{(7–5)} | (France) Marie Villet | (India) Vaishnavi Adkar (Slovakia) Salma Drugdová | (France) Hanna Bougouffa (Italy) Lara Pfeifer (France) Beverley Nyangon (Czech Republic) Zdena Šafářová |
| May 1 | Monastir, Tunisia; Hard; W15; Singles and doubles draws | (Czech Republic) Zdena Šafářová (France) Marie Villet; 6–0, 6–4 | Nina Rudiukova; Elizaveta Shebekina | (India) Vaishnavi Adkar (Slovakia) Salma Drugdová | (France) Hanna Bougouffa (Italy) Lara Pfeifer (France) Beverley Nyangon (Czech Republic) Zdena Šafářová |
| May 1 | Antalya, Turkey; Clay; W15; Singles and doubles draws | Valeriya Yushchenko; 7–6^{(7–3)}, 6–0 | Alevtina Ibragimova | (Republic of Ireland) Celine Simunyu (Germany) Helena Buchwald | (China) Zhang Ruien; Alexandra Shubladze (Turkey) İlay Yörük; Dana Charintceva |
| May 1 | Antalya, Turkey; Clay; W15; Singles and doubles draws | Alevtina Ibragimova; Alexandra Shubladze; 4–6, 6–1, [10–3] | (Turkey) Leyla Nilüfer Elmas (Turkey) Başak Eraydın | (Republic of Ireland) Celine Simunyu (Germany) Helena Buchwald | (China) Zhang Ruien; Alexandra Shubladze (Turkey) İlay Yörük; Dana Charintceva |
| May 1 | Varberg, Sweden; Clay; W15; Singles and doubles draws | (Serbia) Jana Bojović; 1–6, 7–6^{(7–2)}, 6–3 | (Ukraine) Daria Lopatetska | (Sweden) Fanny Östlund (Ukraine) Oleksandra Oliynykova | (Germany) Phillippa Preugschat (Sweden) Nellie Taraba Wallberg (Italy) Nicole Fossa Huergo (Sweden) Tilda Hessleryd |
| May 1 | Varberg, Sweden; Clay; W15; Singles and doubles draws | (Ukraine) Daria Lopatetska (Ukraine) Daria Yesypchuk; Walkover | (Denmark) Olivia Gram (Ukraine) Oleksandra Oliynykova | (Sweden) Fanny Östlund (Ukraine) Oleksandra Oliynykova | (Germany) Phillippa Preugschat (Sweden) Nellie Taraba Wallberg (Italy) Nicole Fossa Huergo (Sweden) Tilda Hessleryd |
| May 8 | Empire Slovak Open; Trnava, Slovakia; Clay; W100; Singles – Doubles | (Belgium) Yanina Wickmayer; 6–0, 6–3 | (Belgium) Greet Minnen | (Czech Republic) Lucie Havlíčková (France) Chloé Paquet | (Ukraine) Katarina Zavatska (Netherlands) Suzan Lamens; Kristina Dmitruk (Switzerland) Viktorija Golubic |
| May 8 | Empire Slovak Open; Trnava, Slovakia; Clay; W100; Singles – Doubles | Amina Anshba (Czech Republic) Anastasia Dețiuc; 6–3, 4–6, [10–4] | (France) Estelle Cascino (Netherlands) Suzan Lamens | (Czech Republic) Lucie Havlíčková (France) Chloé Paquet | (Ukraine) Katarina Zavatska (Netherlands) Suzan Lamens; Kristina Dmitruk (Switzerland) Viktorija Golubic |
| May 8 | Fukuoka International Women's Cup; Fukuoka, Japan; Carpet; W60; Singles – Doubles | (Japan) Natsumi Kawaguchi; Walkover | (United Kingdom) Katie Boulter | (United States) Emina Bektas (Canada) Carol Zhao | (Chinese Taipei) Liang En-shuo (Australia) Lizette Cabrera (Japan) Sara Saito (China) Ma Yexin |
| May 8 | Fukuoka International Women's Cup; Fukuoka, Japan; Carpet; W60; Singles – Doubles | (United States) Emina Bektas (Israel) Lina Glushko; 7–5, 6–3 | (China) Ma Yexin (Australia) Alana Parnaby | (United States) Emina Bektas (Canada) Carol Zhao | (Chinese Taipei) Liang En-shuo (Australia) Lizette Cabrera (Japan) Sara Saito (China) Ma Yexin |
| May 8 | Zagreb Ladies Open; Zagreb, Croatia; Clay; W60; Singles – Doubles | (Romania) Jaqueline Cristian; 6–1, 3–6, 7–6^{(7–0)} | (Germany) Ella Seidel | (France) Diane Parry (France) Carole Monnet | Ekaterina Makarova (North Macedonia) Lina Gjorcheska (Croatia) Jana Fett (Turkey) Zeynep Sönmez |
| May 8 | Zagreb Ladies Open; Zagreb, Croatia; Clay; W60; Singles – Doubles | (Greece) Valentini Grammatikopoulou (Slovenia) Dalila Jakupović; 6–2, 7–5 | (France) Carole Monnet (Croatia) Antonia Ružić | (France) Diane Parry (France) Carole Monnet | Ekaterina Makarova (North Macedonia) Lina Gjorcheska (Croatia) Jana Fett (Turkey) Zeynep Sönmez |
| May 8 | Naples Women's World Tennis Tour; Naples, Florida; Clay; W60; Singles – Doubles | (United States) Caroline Dolehide; 7–5, 7–5 | (Ukraine) Yulia Starodubtseva | (United States) Sophie Chang (United States) Kayla Day | (Mexico) Renata Zarazúa (United States) McCartney Kessler (Mexico) Marcela Zacarías (Australia) Astra Sharma |
| May 8 | Naples Women's World Tennis Tour; Naples, Florida; Clay; W60; Singles – Doubles | (United States) Christina Rosca (Australia) Astra Sharma; 6–1, 7–6^{(15–13)} | (United States) Sophie Chang (United States) Angela Kulikov | (United States) Sophie Chang (United States) Kayla Day | (Mexico) Renata Zarazúa (United States) McCartney Kessler (Mexico) Marcela Zacarías (Australia) Astra Sharma |
| May 8 | Orlando USTA Pro Circuit Event; Orlando, Florida; Clay; W25; Singles and doubles draws | (Hungary) Fanny Stollár; 7–6^{(7–4)}, 6–2 | (United States) Dalayna Hewitt | (United States) Clervie Ngounoue (Serbia) Katarina Jokić | (United States) Victoria Hu (Canada) Cadence Brace (United States) Katerina Stewart (Japan) Sayaka Ishii |
| May 8 | Orlando USTA Pro Circuit Event; Orlando, Florida; Clay; W25; Singles and doubles draws | (United States) Makenna Jones (United States) Maria Mateas; 6–4, 6–2 | (United States) Dalayna Hewitt (Serbia) Katarina Jokić | (United States) Clervie Ngounoue (Serbia) Katarina Jokić | (United States) Victoria Hu (Canada) Cadence Brace (United States) Katerina Stewart (Japan) Sayaka Ishii |
| May 8 | Båstad, Sweden; Clay; W25; Singles and doubles draws | (Argentina) María Lourdes Carlé; 6–4, 6–3 | (Turkey) İpek Öz | (Sweden) Kajsa Rinaldo Persson (France) Alice Tubello | (Liechtenstein) Kathinka von Deichmann (United Kingdom) Eden Silva (Switzerland) Jenny Dürst (Greece) Martha Matoula |
| May 8 | Båstad, Sweden; Clay; W25; Singles and doubles draws | (Switzerland) Jenny Dürst (Sweden) Fanny Östlund; 6–4, 6–7^{(3–7)}, [10–7] | (Poland) Martyna Kubka (Kazakhstan) Zhibek Kulambayeva | (Sweden) Kajsa Rinaldo Persson (France) Alice Tubello | (Liechtenstein) Kathinka von Deichmann (United Kingdom) Eden Silva (Switzerland) Jenny Dürst (Greece) Martha Matoula |
| May 8 | Platja d'Aro, Spain; Clay; W25; Singles and doubles draws | (Brazil) Carolina Alves; 6–1, 6–7^{(1–7)}, 6–4 | (Spain) Carlota Martínez Círez | (United Kingdom) Sonay Kartal (United States) Ashley Lahey | (France) Jessika Ponchet (Spain) Lucía Cortez Llorca (Spain) Jéssica Bouzas Maneiro (Belgium) Hanne Vandewinkel |
| May 8 | Platja d'Aro, Spain; Clay; W25; Singles and doubles draws | (United States) Ashley Lahey (Australia) Ellen Perez; 6–3, 3–6, [12–10] | (Portugal) Francisca Jorge (Portugal) Matilde Jorge | (United Kingdom) Sonay Kartal (United States) Ashley Lahey | (France) Jessika Ponchet (Spain) Lucía Cortez Llorca (Spain) Jéssica Bouzas Maneiro (Belgium) Hanne Vandewinkel |
| May 8 | Kachreti, Georgia; Hard; W25; Singles and doubles draws | (China) Bai Zhuoxuan; 6–4, 7–5 | Valeria Savinykh | Anastasia Zakharova; Polina Iatcenko | Elena Pridankina; Ekaterina Maklakova (United Kingdom) Anna Brogan (China) Wei Sijia |
| May 8 | Kachreti, Georgia; Hard; W25; Singles and doubles draws | (Canada) Stacey Fung; Maria Kozyreva; 7–5, 7–5 | Aglaya Fedorova; Darya Shauha | Anastasia Zakharova; Polina Iatcenko | Elena Pridankina; Ekaterina Maklakova (United Kingdom) Anna Brogan (China) Wei Sijia |
| May 8 | Vierumäki, Finland; Hard; W15; Singles and doubles draws | (Austria) Tamara Kostic; 6–0, 7–5 | (Israel) Vlada Ekshibarova | (Finland) Milla Kotamäki (Belgium) Eliessa Vanlangendonck | (Slovakia) Mia Chudejová (United States) Isabella Barrera Aguirre (France) Astrid Cirotte (France) Jade Bornay |
| May 8 | Vierumäki, Finland; Hard; W15; Singles and doubles draws | (Poland) Weronika Baszak (Estonia) Anet Angelika Koskel; 6–1, 6–0 | (Italy) Carlotta Moccia (Italy) Giulia Stefan | (Finland) Milla Kotamäki (Belgium) Eliessa Vanlangendonck | (Slovakia) Mia Chudejová (United States) Isabella Barrera Aguirre (France) Astrid Cirotte (France) Jade Bornay |
| May 8 | Kuršumlijska Banja, Serbia; Clay; W15; Singles and doubles draws | (Greece) Michaela Laki; 6–1, 6–4 | (Netherlands) Anouk Koevermans | Evialina Laskevich (Serbia) Elena Milovanović | (Serbia) Andjela Lazarević (Serbia) Natalija Senić; Arina Bulatova (Serbia) Anja Stanković |
| May 8 | Kuršumlijska Banja, Serbia; Clay; W15; Singles and doubles draws | (Australia) Elena Micic (Serbia) Anja Stanković; 6–2, 6–4 | (China) Guo Meiqi (China) Wang Meiling | Evialina Laskevich (Serbia) Elena Milovanović | (Serbia) Andjela Lazarević (Serbia) Natalija Senić; Arina Bulatova (Serbia) Anja Stanković |
| May 8 | Pörtschach, Austria; Clay; W15; Singles and doubles draws | (Germany) Carolina Kuhl; 6–1, 1–6, 6–4 | (Belgium) Lara Salden | (Germany) Chantal Sauvant; Valeriia Olianovskaia | (Germany) Mara Guth (Switzerland) Leonie Küng (Romania) Ștefania Bojică (Romania) Ilinca Amariei |
| May 8 | Pörtschach, Austria; Clay; W15; Singles and doubles draws | (Switzerland) Leonie Küng (Germany) Chantal Sauvant; Walkover | Valeriia Olianovskaia (Czech Republic) Linda Ševčíková | (Germany) Chantal Sauvant; Valeriia Olianovskaia | (Germany) Mara Guth (Switzerland) Leonie Küng (Romania) Ștefania Bojică (Romania) Ilinca Amariei |
| May 8 | Monastir, Tunisia; Hard; W15; Singles and doubles draws | (China) Ren Yufei; 6–0, 6–3 | (United Kingdom) Ranah Stoiber | (France) Yasmine Mansouri (Slovakia) Katarína Kužmová | (France) Marie Villet (United Kingdom) Talia Neilson Gatenby (Greece) Magdalini Adaloglou; Victoria Mikhaylova |
| May 8 | Monastir, Tunisia; Hard; W15; Singles and doubles draws | (Canada) Louise Kwong (United States) Anna Ulyashchenko; Walkover | (Slovakia) Salma Drugdová (Slovakia) Katarína Kužmová | (France) Yasmine Mansouri (Slovakia) Katarína Kužmová | (France) Marie Villet (United Kingdom) Talia Neilson Gatenby (Greece) Magdalini Adaloglou; Victoria Mikhaylova |
| May 8 | Antalya, Turkey; Clay; W15; Singles and doubles draws | (Germany) Natalia Siedliska; 6–3, 6–2 | (Romania) Maria Sara Popa | (Turkey) İlay Yörük (Belgium) Amelia Waligora | (Germany) Julia Middendorf (Switzerland) Alina Granwehr (Serbia) Andrea Obradović (Republic of Ireland) Celine Simunyu |
| May 8 | Antalya, Turkey; Clay; W15; Singles and doubles draws | (Germany) Natalia Siedliska (Turkey) Doğa Türkmen; 6–2, 6–2 | Anastasia Kovaleva; Anastasiia Sergienko | (Turkey) İlay Yörük (Belgium) Amelia Waligora | (Germany) Julia Middendorf (Switzerland) Alina Granwehr (Serbia) Andrea Obradović (Republic of Ireland) Celine Simunyu |
| May 15 | Open Villa de Madrid; Madrid, Spain; Clay; W100; Singles – Doubles | (Serbia) Olga Danilović; 6–2, 6–3 | (Spain) Sara Sorribes Tormo | (Canada) Leylah Fernandez (Netherlands) Suzan Lamens | (Netherlands) Arantxa Rus (Romania) Jaqueline Cristian (Spain) Andrea Lázaro García (Ukraine) Katarina Zavatska |
| May 15 | Open Villa de Madrid; Madrid, Spain; Clay; W100; Singles – Doubles | (Japan) Mai Hontama (Japan) Eri Hozumi; 6–0, 7–5 | (Greece) Eleni Christofi (Greece) Despina Papamichail | (Canada) Leylah Fernandez (Netherlands) Suzan Lamens | (Netherlands) Arantxa Rus (Romania) Jaqueline Cristian (Spain) Andrea Lázaro García (Ukraine) Katarina Zavatska |
| May 15 | Pelham Racquet Club Pro Classic; Pelham, Alabama; Clay; W60; Singles – Doubles | Veronika Miroshnichenko; 7–6^{(7–5)}, 6–2 | (Mexico) Renata Zarazúa | (United States) Jamie Loeb (United States) Robin Anderson | (United States) Victoria Hu (United States) Grace Min (Brazil) Gabriela Cé (United States) Whitney Osuigwe |
| May 15 | Pelham Racquet Club Pro Classic; Pelham, Alabama; Clay; W60; Singles – Doubles | (United States) Makenna Jones (United States) Jamie Loeb; 6–4, 7–5 | (United States) Robin Anderson (Australia) Elysia Bolton | (United States) Jamie Loeb (United States) Robin Anderson | (United States) Victoria Hu (United States) Grace Min (Brazil) Gabriela Cé (United States) Whitney Osuigwe |
| May 15 | Hacı Esmer Avcı Tennis Cup; Bodrum, Turkey; Clay; W60; Singles – Doubles | (Argentina) María Lourdes Carlé; 6–4, 6–4 | (Romania) Irina Bara | (Romania) Andreea Prisăcariu (Turkey) Berfu Cengiz | Amina Anshba (Latvia) Darja Semeņistaja (Argentina) Julia Riera; Maria Timofeeva |
| May 15 | Hacı Esmer Avcı Tennis Cup; Bodrum, Turkey; Clay; W60; Singles – Doubles | (Romania) Oana Gavrilă (Netherlands) Isabelle Haverlag; 6–4, 7–6^{(7–3)} | (Turkey) Ayla Aksu (United Kingdom) Harriet Dart | (Romania) Andreea Prisăcariu (Turkey) Berfu Cengiz | Amina Anshba (Latvia) Darja Semeņistaja (Argentina) Julia Riera; Maria Timofeeva |
| May 15 | Open Saint-Gaudens Occitanie; Saint-Gaudens, France; Clay; W60; Singles – Doubles | (United States) Robin Montgomery; 7–5, 6–4 | (France) Alice Robbe | (Uzbekistan) Nigina Abduraimova (Ukraine) Daria Snigur | (France) Margaux Rouvroy (Czech Republic) Anna Sisková (France) Lucie Nguyen Tan (Andorra) Victoria Jiménez Kasintseva |
| May 15 | Open Saint-Gaudens Occitanie; Saint-Gaudens, France; Clay; W60; Singles – Doubles | Sofya Lansere (Czech Republic) Anna Sisková; 6–0, 3–6, [10–6] | (Colombia) María Herazo González (United States) Adriana Reami | (Uzbekistan) Nigina Abduraimova (Ukraine) Daria Snigur | (France) Margaux Rouvroy (Czech Republic) Anna Sisková (France) Lucie Nguyen Tan (Andorra) Victoria Jiménez Kasintseva |
| May 15 | Kurume U.S.E Cup; Kurume, Japan; Grass; W60; Singles – Doubles | (United States) Emina Bektas; 7–5, 5–7, 6–1 | (China) Ma Yexin | (Japan) Haruka Kaji (Australia) Lizette Cabrera | (Chinese Taipei) Liang En-shuo (Japan) Ayano Shimizu (China) Wang Yafan (Poland) Olivia Lincer |
| May 15 | Kurume U.S.E Cup; Kurume, Japan; Grass; W60; Singles – Doubles | (Australia) Talia Gibson (China) Wang Yafan; 6–3, 6–3 | (Japan) Funa Kozaki (Japan) Junri Namigata | (Japan) Haruka Kaji (Australia) Lizette Cabrera | (Chinese Taipei) Liang En-shuo (Japan) Ayano Shimizu (China) Wang Yafan (Poland) Olivia Lincer |
| May 15 | Kuršumlijska Banja, Serbia; Clay; W25; Singles and doubles draws | Julia Avdeeva; 6–1, 6–4 | (North Macedonia) Lina Gjorcheska | (Romania) Cristina Dinu (Kazakhstan) Zhibek Kulambayeva | (Turkey) İpek Öz (Sweden) Kajsa Rinaldo Persson (Spain) Carlota Martínez Círez (Greece) Elena Korokozidi |
| May 15 | Kuršumlijska Banja, Serbia; Clay; W25; Singles and doubles draws | (Poland) Martyna Kubka (Kazakhstan) Zhibek Kulambayeva; 6–3, 6–3 | Alexandra Azarko; Victoria Borodulina | (Romania) Cristina Dinu (Kazakhstan) Zhibek Kulambayeva | (Turkey) İpek Öz (Sweden) Kajsa Rinaldo Persson (Spain) Carlota Martínez Círez (Greece) Elena Korokozidi |
| May 15 | Torneo Conchita Martínez; Monzón, Spain; Hard; W25; Singles and doubles draws | (Czech Republic) Gabriela Knutson; 6–4, 6–2 | (Australia) Maddison Inglis | (Netherlands) Arianne Hartono (Australia) Ellen Perez | (Serbia) Mihaela Djaković (Italy) Jennifer Ruggeri (Spain) Georgina García Pérez (United States) Jessica Failla |
| May 15 | Torneo Conchita Martínez; Monzón, Spain; Hard; W25; Singles and doubles draws | (Australia) Gabriella Da Silva-Fick (Luxembourg) Marie Weckerle; 6–2, 6–1 | (Spain) Laura García Astudillo (Spain) Georgina García Pérez | (Netherlands) Arianne Hartono (Australia) Ellen Perez | (Serbia) Mihaela Djaković (Italy) Jennifer Ruggeri (Spain) Georgina García Pérez (United States) Jessica Failla |
| May 15 | Incheon, South Korea; Hard; W25; Singles and doubles draws | (Hong Kong) Cody Wong; 1–6, 6–3, 3–0 ret. | (China) Jiang Xinyu | (South Korea) Back Da-yeon (South Korea) Ahn Yu-jin | (South Korea) Im Hee-rae (Thailand) Peangtarn Plipuech (Australia) Destanee Aiava (Japan) Ikumi Yamazaki |
| May 15 | Incheon, South Korea; Hard; W25; Singles and doubles draws | (South Korea) Choi Ji-hee (South Korea) Ku Yeon-woo; 6–1, 6–1 | (Chinese Taipei) Li Yu-yun (China) Tang Qianhui | (South Korea) Back Da-yeon (South Korea) Ahn Yu-jin | (South Korea) Im Hee-rae (Thailand) Peangtarn Plipuech (Australia) Destanee Aiava (Japan) Ikumi Yamazaki |
| May 15 | Kachreti, Georgia; Hard; W25; Singles and doubles draws | (Georgia (country)) Ekaterine Gorgodze; 6–2, 6–2 | (United Kingdom) Anna Brogan | Ekaterina Maklakova (Serbia) Dejana Radanović | Polina Iatcenko; Elena Pridankina (Georgia (country)) Sofia Shapatava (India) Sahaja Yamalapalli |
| May 15 | Kachreti, Georgia; Hard; W25; Singles and doubles draws | Maria Kozyreva; Ekaterina Ovcharenko; 7–5, 6–3 | Anastasia Zolotareva; Rada Zolotareva | Ekaterina Maklakova (Serbia) Dejana Radanović | Polina Iatcenko; Elena Pridankina (Georgia (country)) Sofia Shapatava (India) Sahaja Yamalapalli |
| May 15 | Bethany Beach, United States; Clay; W25; Singles and doubles draws | (United States) Liv Hovde; 6–4, 6–7^{(5–7)}, 6–2 | (United States) Raveena Kingsley | (Ukraine) Hanna Poznikhirenko (United States) Hina Inoue | (United States) Maria Mateas (United States) Mia Horvit (United States) Victoria Osuigwe (United States) Mia Yamakita |
| May 15 | Bethany Beach, United States; Clay; W25; Singles and doubles draws | (United States) Alexa Glatch (Ukraine) Hanna Poznikhirenko; 7–5, 7–5 | (South Africa) Gabriella Broadfoot (United States) Victoria Osuigwe | (Ukraine) Hanna Poznikhirenko (United States) Hina Inoue | (United States) Maria Mateas (United States) Mia Horvit (United States) Victoria Osuigwe (United States) Mia Yamakita |
| May 15 | Feld am See, Austria; Clay; W25; Singles and doubles draws | (Belgium) Sofia Costoulas; 6–3, 6–1 | (Belgium) Lara Salden | (Hungary) Réka Luca Jani (United States) Elvina Kalieva | (Germany) Mara Guth (France) Tessah Andrianjafitrimo (Poland) Maja Chwalińska (Lithuania) Justina Mikulskytė |
| May 15 | Feld am See, Austria; Clay; W25; Singles and doubles draws | (Czech Republic) Denisa Hindová (United States) Chiara Scholl; 6–2, 6–0 | (Belgium) Sofia Costoulas (Canada) Kayla Cross | (Hungary) Réka Luca Jani (United States) Elvina Kalieva | (Germany) Mara Guth (France) Tessah Andrianjafitrimo (Poland) Maja Chwalińska (Lithuania) Justina Mikulskytė |
| May 15 | Curitiba, Brazil; Clay; W15; Singles and doubles draws | (Argentina) Jazmín Ortenzi; 6–3, 6–3 | (Brazil) Ana Candiotto | (Brazil) Geórgia Gulin (Argentina) Josefina Estévez | (Argentina) Lourdes Ayala (Paraguay) Ana Paula Neffa de los Ríos (Mexico) Marian Gómez Pezuela Cano (India) Smriti Bhasin |
| May 15 | Curitiba, Brazil; Clay; W15; Singles and doubles draws | (Brazil) Ana Candiotto (Brazil) Rebeca Pereira; 7–5, 3–6, [10–3] | (United States) Sabastiani León (Argentina) Jazmín Ortenzi | (Brazil) Geórgia Gulin (Argentina) Josefina Estévez | (Argentina) Lourdes Ayala (Paraguay) Ana Paula Neffa de los Ríos (Mexico) Marian Gómez Pezuela Cano (India) Smriti Bhasin |
| May 15 | Monastir, Tunisia; Hard; W15; Singles and doubles draws | (Slovakia) Katarína Kužmová; 3–6, 7–6^{(7–4)}, 6–3 | (Japan) Hiroko Kuwata | (China) Wang Jiaqi (Italy) Giulia Crescenzi | (Tunisia) Chiraz Bechri (France) Lola Marandel (Spain) Noelia Bouzó Zanotti (Italy) Maria Vittoria Viviani |
| May 15 | Monastir, Tunisia; Hard; W15; Singles and doubles draws | (India) Sharmada Balu (Malta) Elaine Genovese; 0–6, 6–4, [11–9] | (Canada) Louise Kwong (United States) Anna Ulyashchenko | (China) Wang Jiaqi (Italy) Giulia Crescenzi | (Tunisia) Chiraz Bechri (France) Lola Marandel (Spain) Noelia Bouzó Zanotti (Italy) Maria Vittoria Viviani |
| May 15 | Antalya, Turkey; Clay; W15; Singles and doubles draws | (Italy) Verena Meliss; 4–6, 6–1, 6–3 | (Germany) Chantal Sauvant | (Netherlands) Lian Tran (Belgium) Amelie Van Impe | Valeriya Yushchenko (Slovakia) Anika Jašková (Turkey) Selin Övünç (Switzerland) Marie Mettraux |
| May 15 | Antalya, Turkey; Clay; W15; Singles and doubles draws | (Slovakia) Anika Jašková (Slovakia) Nina Vargová; 6–2, 6–1 | (Turkey) Doğa Türkmen (Belgium) Amelie Van Impe | (Netherlands) Lian Tran (Belgium) Amelie Van Impe | Valeriya Yushchenko (Slovakia) Anika Jašková (Turkey) Selin Övünç (Switzerland) Marie Mettraux |
| May 22 | Città di Grado Tennis Cup; Grado, Italy; Clay; W60; Singles – Doubles | Yuliya Hatouka; 2–6, 6–3, 6–1 | (Czech Republic) Lucie Havlíčková | (Spain) Irene Burillo Escorihuela (Italy) Camilla Rosatello | Alina Korneeva (United States) Asia Muhammad (Turkey) Zeynep Sönmez (United States) Hailey Baptiste |
| May 22 | Città di Grado Tennis Cup; Grado, Italy; Clay; W60; Singles – Doubles | (United Kingdom) Emily Appleton (Germany) Julia Lohoff; 3–6, 6–4, [11–9] | Sofya Lansere (Czech Republic) Anna Sisková | (Spain) Irene Burillo Escorihuela (Italy) Camilla Rosatello | Alina Korneeva (United States) Asia Muhammad (Turkey) Zeynep Sönmez (United States) Hailey Baptiste |
| May 22 | Otočec, Slovenia; Clay; W40; Singles and doubles draws | (Slovakia) Rebecca Šramková; 6–3, 7–6^{(7–2)} | (Australia) Seone Mendez | (Romania) Irina Bara (Slovenia) Veronika Erjavec | (North Macedonia) Lina Gjorcheska (Romania) Cristina Dinu (Turkey) İpek Öz (Romania) Andreea Prisăcariu |
| May 22 | Otočec, Slovenia; Clay; W40; Singles and doubles draws | (Slovenia) Veronika Erjavec (Czech Republic) Dominika Šalková; 7–5, 6–3 | (Croatia) Mariana Dražić (United Kingdom) Emily Webley-Smith | (Romania) Irina Bara (Slovenia) Veronika Erjavec | (North Macedonia) Lina Gjorcheska (Romania) Cristina Dinu (Turkey) İpek Öz (Romania) Andreea Prisăcariu |
| May 22 | Monastir, Tunisia; Hard; W25; Singles and doubles draws | (Australia) Taylah Preston; 3–6, 7–6^{(7–5)}, 6–3 | (Czech Republic) Gabriela Knutson | (China) Wang Jiaqi (China) Wei Sijia | (Philippines) Alex Eala (India) Sahaja Yamalapalli (Spain) Noelia Bouzó Zanotti (Finland) Anastasia Kulikova |
| May 22 | Monastir, Tunisia; Hard; W25; Singles and doubles draws | (United Kingdom) Lauryn John-Baptiste (France) Yasmine Mansouri; 6–3, 6–1 | (Egypt) Lamis Alhussein Abdel Aziz (India) Sharmada Balu | (China) Wang Jiaqi (China) Wei Sijia | (Philippines) Alex Eala (India) Sahaja Yamalapalli (Spain) Noelia Bouzó Zanotti (Finland) Anastasia Kulikova |
| May 22 | Warmbad Villach, Austria; Clay; W25; Singles and doubles draws | (United States) Elvina Kalieva; 4–6, 6–2, 6–1 | (Czech Republic) Julie Štruplová | (Germany) Kathleen Kanev (Lithuania) Justina Mikulskytė | (United States) Jessie Aney (Austria) Mavie Österreicher (Slovenia) Nika Radišić (Germany) Lena Papadakis |
| May 22 | Warmbad Villach, Austria; Clay; W25; Singles and doubles draws | (Switzerland) Jenny Dürst (Slovenia) Nika Radišić; 6–2, 7–6^{(7–4)} | (United States) Jessie Aney (Germany) Lena Papadakis | (Germany) Kathleen Kanev (Lithuania) Justina Mikulskytė | (United States) Jessie Aney (Austria) Mavie Österreicher (Slovenia) Nika Radišić (Germany) Lena Papadakis |
| May 22 | Goyang, South Korea; Hard; W25; Singles and doubles draws | (United States) Hanna Chang; 6–2, 6–4 | (Thailand) Mananchaya Sawangkaew | (China) Liu Fangzhou (China) Guo Hanyu | (Japan) Kyōka Okamura (South Korea) Park So-hyun (Thailand) Luksika Kumkhum (Australia) Lizette Cabrera |
| May 22 | Goyang, South Korea; Hard; W25; Singles and doubles draws | (Thailand) Punnin Kovapitukted (Thailand) Luksika Kumkhum; 6–3, 1–6, [10–6] | (China) Guo Hanyu (China) Tang Qianhui | (China) Liu Fangzhou (China) Guo Hanyu | (Japan) Kyōka Okamura (South Korea) Park So-hyun (Thailand) Luksika Kumkhum (Australia) Lizette Cabrera |
| May 22 | Karuizawa, Japan; Grass; W25; Singles and doubles draws | (China) Wang Yafan; 6–0, 6–1 | (Japan) Haruka Kaji | (Japan) Ayano Shimizu (Japan) Mio Mushika | (Denmark) Johanne Svendsen (Japan) Aoi Ito (Japan) Miho Kuramochi (Japan) Momoko Kobori |
| May 22 | Karuizawa, Japan; Grass; W25; Singles and doubles draws | (Japan) Momoko Kobori (Japan) Ayano Shimizu; 3–6, 7–6^{(8–6)}, [10–5] | (Australia) Talia Gibson (Japan) Akari Inoue | (Japan) Ayano Shimizu (Japan) Mio Mushika | (Denmark) Johanne Svendsen (Japan) Aoi Ito (Japan) Miho Kuramochi (Japan) Momoko Kobori |
| May 22 | Málaga, Spain; Hard; W15; Singles and doubles draws | (Slovakia) Katarína Strešnáková; 4–6, 7–5, 7–5 | (China) Mi Tianmi | (Mexico) Victoria Rodríguez (United States) Varvara Lepchenko | (Argentina) Solana Sierra (United Kingdom) Matilda Mutavdzic (Spain) Marta Soriano Santiago (United States) Jessica Failla |
| May 22 | Málaga, Spain; Hard; W15; Singles and doubles draws | (United States) Jessica Failla (Slovakia) Katarína Strešnáková; 6–3, 6–3 | (United States) Isabella Barrera Aguirre (Spain) Marina Benito | (Mexico) Victoria Rodríguez (United States) Varvara Lepchenko | (Argentina) Solana Sierra (United Kingdom) Matilda Mutavdzic (Spain) Marta Soriano Santiago (United States) Jessica Failla |
| May 22 | Recife, Brazil; Clay; W15; Singles and doubles draws | (Argentina) Jazmín Ortenzi; 6–4, 7–5 | (United States) Sabastiani León | (Paraguay) Ana Paula Neffa de los Ríos (Brazil) Júlia Konishi Camargo Silva | (Brazil) Paola Ueno Dalmonico (Chile) Alessandra Caceres (Mexico) Amanda Carolina Nava Elkin (India) Smriti Bhasin |
| May 22 | Recife, Brazil; Clay; W15; Singles and doubles draws | (United States) Sabastiani León (Argentina) Jazmín Ortenzi; 6–1, 6–3 | (Argentina) Luciana Blatter (Argentina) Martina Belén Roldán Santander | (Paraguay) Ana Paula Neffa de los Ríos (Brazil) Júlia Konishi Camargo Silva | (Brazil) Paola Ueno Dalmonico (Chile) Alessandra Caceres (Mexico) Amanda Carolina Nava Elkin (India) Smriti Bhasin |
| May 22 | Huntsville, United States; Clay; W15; Singles and doubles draws | (France) Tiphanie Lemaître; 6–7^{(3–7)}, 7–6^{(7–5)}, 6–2 | (United States) DJ Bennett | (Chinese Taipei) Hsu Chieh-yu (United States) Rhiann Newborn | (United States) Rasheeda McAdoo (United States) Kolie Allen (Argentina) Melany Krywoj (United States) Brianna Baldi |
| May 22 | Huntsville, United States; Clay; W15; Singles and doubles draws | (United States) Rhiann Newborn (United States) Mia Yamakita; 7–5, 6–3 | (United States) Kolie Allen (United States) Paris Corley | (Chinese Taipei) Hsu Chieh-yu (United States) Rhiann Newborn | (United States) Rasheeda McAdoo (United States) Kolie Allen (Argentina) Melany Krywoj (United States) Brianna Baldi |
| May 22 | Kuršumlijska Banja, Serbia; Clay; W15; Singles and doubles draws | (Kazakhstan) Zhibek Kulambayeva; 6–3, 6–1 | (Greece) Eleni Christofi | (United Kingdom) Eleanor Baglow (Romania) Karola Bejenaru | (Slovakia) Nina Vargová (Italy) Denise Valente (Bulgaria) Jana Stojanova (Serbia) Anja Stanković |
| May 22 | Kuršumlijska Banja, Serbia; Clay; W15; Singles and doubles draws | (Greece) Eleni Christofi (Switzerland) Sebastianna Scilipoti; 5–7, 6–4, [10–6] | (Belgium) Tilwith Di Girolami (Slovakia) Nina Vargová | (United Kingdom) Eleanor Baglow (Romania) Karola Bejenaru | (Slovakia) Nina Vargová (Italy) Denise Valente (Bulgaria) Jana Stojanova (Serbia) Anja Stanković |
| May 29 | Internazionali Femminili di Brescia; Brescia, Italy; Clay; W60; Singles – Doubles | (Ukraine) Katarina Zavatska; 6–4, 6–2 | Yuliya Hatouka | (Spain) Ángela Fita Boluda (Argentina) Julia Riera | (United States) Ann Li (United States) Louisa Chirico (Japan) Mai Hontama (Germany) Kathleen Kanev |
| May 29 | Internazionali Femminili di Brescia; Brescia, Italy; Clay; W60; Singles – Doubles | (Japan) Mai Hontama (Japan) Moyuka Uchijima; 6–1, 6–0 | Alena Fomina-Klotz (Australia) Olivia Tjandramulia | (Spain) Ángela Fita Boluda (Argentina) Julia Riera | (United States) Ann Li (United States) Louisa Chirico (Japan) Mai Hontama (Germany) Kathleen Kanev |
| May 29 | Otočec, Slovenia; Clay; W40; Singles and doubles draws | (Greece) Valentini Grammatikopoulou; 6–4, 6–4 | (Slovakia) Rebecca Šramková | (United States) Elvina Kalieva (Romania) Ilinca Amariei | (Ukraine) Oleksandra Oliynykova (Romania) Irina Bara (Bulgaria) Gergana Topalova (Australia) Seone Mendez |
| May 29 | Otočec, Slovenia; Clay; W40; Singles and doubles draws | (Georgia (country)) Ekaterine Gorgodze (United States) Elvina Kalieva; 6–2, 6–3 | (Canada) Kayla Cross (United States) Sofia Sewing | (United States) Elvina Kalieva (Romania) Ilinca Amariei | (Ukraine) Oleksandra Oliynykova (Romania) Irina Bara (Bulgaria) Gergana Topalova (Australia) Seone Mendez |
| May 29 | Montemor-o-Novo, Portugal; Hard; W40; Singles and doubles draws | (Australia) Olivia Gadecki; 6–3, 6–2 | (Australia) Arina Rodionova | (Portugal) Francisca Jorge (Netherlands) Arianne Hartono | (Australia) Alexandra Bozovic (India) Karman Kaur Thandi (Hong Kong) Eudice Chong; Aliona Falei |
| May 29 | Montemor-o-Novo, Portugal; Hard; W40; Singles and doubles draws | (Hong Kong) Eudice Chong (Netherlands) Arianne Hartono; 6–2, 6–0 | (Switzerland) Naïma Karamoko (Switzerland) Conny Perrin | (Portugal) Francisca Jorge (Netherlands) Arianne Hartono | (Australia) Alexandra Bozovic (India) Karman Kaur Thandi (Hong Kong) Eudice Chong; Aliona Falei |
| May 29 | Annenheim, Austria; Clay; W25; Singles and doubles draws | (Czech Republic) Jesika Malečková; 6–2, 6–0 | (Romania) Miriam Bulgaru | (Ukraine) Valeriya Strakhova (Romania) Alexandra Cadanțu-Ignatik | (Switzerland) Lara Michel (Switzerland) Jenny Dürst (Latvia) Diāna Marcinkēviča (Switzerland) Alina Granwehr |
| May 29 | Annenheim, Austria; Clay; W25; Singles and doubles draws | (Hungary) Amarissa Kiara Tóth; Anna Zyryanova; 6–4, 2–6, [10–8] | (Czech Republic) Michaela Bayerlová (Switzerland) Jenny Dürst | (Ukraine) Valeriya Strakhova (Romania) Alexandra Cadanțu-Ignatik | (Switzerland) Lara Michel (Switzerland) Jenny Dürst (Latvia) Diāna Marcinkēviča (Switzerland) Alina Granwehr |
| May 29 | Changwon, South Korea; Hard; W25; Singles and doubles draws | (South Korea) Park So-hyun; 6–4, 7–5 | (Chinese Taipei) Liang En-shuo | (China) Ma Yexin (China) You Xiaodi | (Australia) Lizette Cabrera (South Korea) Kim Da-bin (Chinese Taipei) Lee Ya-hsuan (Australia) Kaylah McPhee |
| May 29 | Changwon, South Korea; Hard; W25; Singles and doubles draws | (China) Guo Hanyu (China) Jiang Xinyu; 7–6^{(7–4)}, 7–6^{(7–1)} | (Chinese Taipei) Cho I-hsuan (Chinese Taipei) Cho Yi-Tsen | (China) Ma Yexin (China) You Xiaodi | (Australia) Lizette Cabrera (South Korea) Kim Da-bin (Chinese Taipei) Lee Ya-hsuan (Australia) Kaylah McPhee |
| May 29 | La Marsa, Tunisia; Hard; W25; Singles and doubles draws | (India) Rutuja Bhosale; 0–6, 6–3, 6–4 | Anastasia Gasanova | (China) Wei Sijia (India) Sahaja Yamalapalli | (Australia) Taylah Preston (Lithuania) Justina Mikulskytė (Germany) Alexandra Vecic; Ekaterina Yashina |
| May 29 | La Marsa, Tunisia; Hard; W25; Singles and doubles draws | Anastasia Gasanova; Ekaterina Yashina; 7–5, 6–7^{(1–7)}, [11–9] | (Bulgaria) Isabella Shinikova (China) Wei Sijia | (China) Wei Sijia (India) Sahaja Yamalapalli | (Australia) Taylah Preston (Lithuania) Justina Mikulskytė (Germany) Alexandra Vecic; Ekaterina Yashina |
| May 29 | Nakhon Si Thammarat, Thailand; Hard; W25; Singles and doubles draws | (Japan) Haruna Arakawa; 6–4, 6–4 | (United States) Dasha Ivanova | (Thailand) Peangtarn Plipuech (India) Vaidehi Chaudhari | (Thailand) Anchisa Chanta; Anastasia Sukhotina (China) Lu Jiajing (China) Liu Yanni |
| May 29 | Nakhon Si Thammarat, Thailand; Hard; W25; Singles and doubles draws | (India) Shrivalli Bhamidipaty (India) Vaidehi Chaudhari; 6–4, 6–3 | (India) Zeel Desai; Anastasia Sukhotina | (Thailand) Peangtarn Plipuech (India) Vaidehi Chaudhari | (Thailand) Anchisa Chanta; Anastasia Sukhotina (China) Lu Jiajing (China) Liu Yanni |
| May 29 | Tokyo, Japan; Hard; W25; Singles and doubles draws | (China) Wang Yafan; 6–1, 6–0 | (Denmark) Johanne Svendsen | (Japan) Eri Shimizu (Japan) Ayano Shimizu | (Japan) Erika Sema (Japan) Mayuka Aikawa (Japan) Aoi Ito (Japan) Mana Ayukawa |
| May 29 | Tokyo, Japan; Hard; W25; Singles and doubles draws | (Thailand) Luksika Kumkhum (Japan) Kanako Morisaki; 1–6, 6–2, [10–3] | (Australia) Talia Gibson (Japan) Natsumi Kawaguchi | (Japan) Eri Shimizu (Japan) Ayano Shimizu | (Japan) Erika Sema (Japan) Mayuka Aikawa (Japan) Aoi Ito (Japan) Mana Ayukawa |
| May 29 | Troisdorf, Germany; Clay; W25; Singles and doubles draws | (Germany) Carolina Kuhl; 3–6, 6–4, 6–4 | Julia Avdeeva | (Ukraine) Anastasiya Soboleva; Ekaterina Makarova | (Germany) Noma Noha Akugue (Colombia) María Herazo González (Germany) Julia Middendorf (Germany) Stephanie Wagner |
| May 29 | Troisdorf, Germany; Clay; W25; Singles and doubles draws | (Belgium) Sofia Costoulas (Belgium) Lara Salden; 7–6^{(7–4)}, 6–4 | (Belgium) Tilwith Di Girolami (United States) Chiara Scholl | (Ukraine) Anastasiya Soboleva; Ekaterina Makarova | (Germany) Noma Noha Akugue (Colombia) María Herazo González (Germany) Julia Middendorf (Germany) Stephanie Wagner |
| May 29 | Yecla, Spain; Hard; W25; Singles and doubles draws | (Philippines) Alex Eala; 6–3, 7–5 | (Switzerland) Valentina Ryser | (Spain) Eva Guerrero Álvarez (Argentina) Lucía Peyre | (Spain) Lucía Cortez Llorca (Mexico) Ana Sofía Sánchez (Serbia) Katarina Kozarov (Mexico) Victoria Rodríguez |
| May 29 | Yecla, Spain; Hard; W25; Singles and doubles draws | (Spain) Georgina García Pérez (Serbia) Katarina Kozarov; 6–3, 6–4 | (Italy) Nicole Fossa Huergo (United Kingdom) Matilda Mutavdzic | (Spain) Eva Guerrero Álvarez (Argentina) Lucía Peyre | (Spain) Lucía Cortez Llorca (Mexico) Ana Sofía Sánchez (Serbia) Katarina Kozarov (Mexico) Victoria Rodríguez |
| May 29 | Kuršumlijska Banja, Serbia; Clay; W15; Singles and doubles draws | (Switzerland) Sebastianna Scilipoti; 6–3, 6–0 | (Serbia) Anja Stanković | (Italy) Beatrice Ricci (Morocco) Yasmine Kabbaj | (Italy) Giulia Carbonaro (Poland) Zuzanna Bednarz (China) Guo Meiqi (United States) Katerina Stewart |
| May 29 | Kuršumlijska Banja, Serbia; Clay; W15; Singles and doubles draws | (Poland) Zuzanna Bednarz (Ukraine) Daria Yesypchuk; 7–6^{(7–4)}, 4–6, [10–8] | (China) Guo Meiqi (Serbia) Iva Šepa | (Italy) Beatrice Ricci (Morocco) Yasmine Kabbaj | (Italy) Giulia Carbonaro (Poland) Zuzanna Bednarz (China) Guo Meiqi (United States) Katerina Stewart |
| May 29 | Monastir, Tunisia; Hard; W15; Singles and doubles draws | (Egypt) Lamis Alhussein Abdel Aziz; 7–5, 6–3 | (Italy) Martina Spigarelli | (France) Jade Bornay; Aleksandra Pozarenko | (United States) Anna Ulyashchenko (France) Emmanuelle Girard (Poland) Joanna Zawadzka (United Kingdom) Jasmine Conway |
| May 29 | Monastir, Tunisia; Hard; W15; Singles and doubles draws | (Canada) Louise Kwong (United States) Anna Ulyashchenko; 4–6, 6–2, [10–5] | (Spain) Noelia Bouzó Zanotti (United Kingdom) Alisha Reayer | (France) Jade Bornay; Aleksandra Pozarenko | (United States) Anna Ulyashchenko (France) Emmanuelle Girard (Poland) Joanna Zawadzka (United Kingdom) Jasmine Conway |
| May 29 | Rancho Santa Fe, United States; Hard; W15; Singles and doubles draws | (United States) Megan McCray; 6–1, 0–6, 6–4 | (China) Tian Fangran | (United States) Solymar Colling (United States) Haley Giavara | (United States) Emily Gelber (Paraguay) Leyla Fiorella Brítez Risso (United States) Katherine Hui (Spain) Alicia Herrero Liñana |
| May 29 | Rancho Santa Fe, United States; Hard; W15; Singles and doubles draws | (United States) Eryn Cayetano (United States) Isabella Chhiv; 6–4, 6–3 | (United States) Megan McCray (United States) Brandy Walker | (United States) Solymar Colling (United States) Haley Giavara | (United States) Emily Gelber (Paraguay) Leyla Fiorella Brítez Risso (United States) Katherine Hui (Spain) Alicia Herrero Liñana |

=== June ===
| Week of | Tournament | Winner | Runners-up | Semifinalists | Quarterfinalists |
|---|---|---|---|---|---|
| June 5 | Surbiton Trophy; Surbiton, United Kingdom; Grass; W100; Singles – Doubles | (Belgium) Yanina Wickmayer; 2–6, 6–4, 7–6^{(7–1)} | (United Kingdom) Katie Swan | (United Kingdom) Yuriko Miyazaki (United Kingdom) Katie Boulter | (Germany) Tatjana Maria (United Kingdom) Isabelle Lacy (Ukraine) Daria Snigur (Switzerland) Viktorija Golubic |
| June 5 | Surbiton Trophy; Surbiton, United Kingdom; Grass; W100; Singles – Doubles | (United States) Sophie Chang (Belgium) Yanina Wickmayer; 6–4, 6–1 | (United Kingdom) Alicia Barnett (United Kingdom) Olivia Nicholls | (United Kingdom) Yuriko Miyazaki (United Kingdom) Katie Boulter | (Germany) Tatjana Maria (United Kingdom) Isabelle Lacy (Ukraine) Daria Snigur (Switzerland) Viktorija Golubic |
| June 5 | Internazionali Femminili di Tennis Città di Caserta; Caserta, Italy; Clay; W60; Singles – Doubles | (United States) Hailey Baptiste; 6–3, 6–2 | (Cyprus) Raluca Șerban | (Italy) Camilla Rosatello; Anastasia Tikhonova | (Italy) Georgia Pedone (Brazil) Gabriela Cé (Estonia) Elena Malõgina (United States) Louisa Chirico |
| June 5 | Internazionali Femminili di Tennis Città di Caserta; Caserta, Italy; Clay; W60; Singles – Doubles | Anastasia Tikhonova (Japan) Moyuka Uchijima; 6–4, 6–2 | (Greece) Despina Papamichail (Italy) Camilla Rosatello | (Italy) Camilla Rosatello; Anastasia Tikhonova | (Italy) Georgia Pedone (Brazil) Gabriela Cé (Estonia) Elena Malõgina (United States) Louisa Chirico |
| June 5 | La Marsa, Tunisia; Hard; W40; Singles and doubles draws | Jana Kolodynska; 6–2, 2–0 ret. | (Lithuania) Justina Mikulskytė | (Switzerland) Nadine Keller (Sweden) Fanny Östlund | (Greece) Martha Matoula (Serbia) Dejana Radanović (India) Rutuja Bhosale; Anastasia Gasanova |
| June 5 | La Marsa, Tunisia; Hard; W40; Singles and doubles draws | Maria Kozyreva (China) Wei Sijia; 5–7, 6–4, [10–6] | (Ukraine) Kateryna Bondarenko (Japan) Hiroko Kuwata | (Switzerland) Nadine Keller (Sweden) Fanny Östlund | (Greece) Martha Matoula (Serbia) Dejana Radanović (India) Rutuja Bhosale; Anastasia Gasanova |
| June 5 | Pörtschach, Austria; Clay; W25; Singles and doubles draws | (Poland) Weronika Falkowska; 4–6, 6–1, 6–1 | (Romania) Alexandra Cadanțu-Ignatik | (Canada) Victoria Mboko (Romania) Gabriela Lee | (Morocco) Yasmine Kabbaj (United States) Sofia Sewing (Liechtenstein) Kathinka von Deichmann; Ekaterina Makarova |
| June 5 | Pörtschach, Austria; Clay; W25; Singles and doubles draws | (Poland) Weronika Falkowska (United States) Sofia Sewing; 6–1, 6–2 | (Romania) Elena-Teodora Cadar (Latvia) Diāna Marcinkēviča | (Canada) Victoria Mboko (Romania) Gabriela Lee | (Morocco) Yasmine Kabbaj (United States) Sofia Sewing (Liechtenstein) Kathinka von Deichmann; Ekaterina Makarova |
| June 5 | Madrid, Spain; Hard; W25; Singles and doubles draws | (United States) Makenna Jones; 6–2, 6–3 | (Japan) Sakura Hosogi | (Sweden) Jacqueline Cabaj Awad (Germany) Alexandra Vecic | (China) Li Zongyu (Philippines) Alex Eala (Turkey) Ayla Aksu (Slovakia) Katarína Strešnáková |
| June 5 | Madrid, Spain; Hard; W25; Singles and doubles draws | (United States) Dalayna Hewitt (United States) Alana Smith; 4–6, 6–2, [10–6] | (China) Li Zongyu (India) Vasanti Shinde | (Sweden) Jacqueline Cabaj Awad (Germany) Alexandra Vecic | (China) Li Zongyu (Philippines) Alex Eala (Turkey) Ayla Aksu (Slovakia) Katarína Strešnáková |
| June 5 | Luzhou, China; Hard; W25; Singles and doubles draws | (China) Wang Yafan; 7–5, 6–2 | (China) You Xiaodi | (China) Huang Jiaqi (China) Zheng Wushuang | (China) Xun Fangying (China) Che Yujiao (China) Shi Han (China) Wang Jiaqi |
| June 5 | Luzhou, China; Hard; W25; Singles and doubles draws | (Chinese Taipei) Li Yu-yun (China) Tang Qianhui; 7–6^{(7–4)}, 6–2 | (China) Feng Shuo (China) Zheng Wushuang | (China) Huang Jiaqi (China) Zheng Wushuang | (China) Xun Fangying (China) Che Yujiao (China) Shi Han (China) Wang Jiaqi |
| June 5 | Setúbal, Portugal; Hard; W25; Singles and doubles draws | (Netherlands) Arianne Hartono; 6–2, 6–2 | (United States) Madison Sieg | (Portugal) Angelina Voloshchuk; Anna Kubareva | (United States) Hina Inoue (Portugal) Matilde Jorge; Aliona Falei (Australia) Gabriella Da Silva-Fick |
| June 5 | Setúbal, Portugal; Hard; W25; Singles and doubles draws | (Australia) Elysia Bolton (Australia) Alexandra Bozovic; 6–7^{(6–8)}, 7–6^{(7–3)}, [10–8] | (Australia) Gabriella Da Silva-Fick (Australia) Petra Hule | (Portugal) Angelina Voloshchuk; Anna Kubareva | (United States) Hina Inoue (Portugal) Matilde Jorge; Aliona Falei (Australia) Gabriella Da Silva-Fick |
| June 5 | Kuršumlijska Banja, Serbia; Clay; W25; Singles and doubles draws | (Greece) Dimitra Pavlou; 6–3, 2–6, 6–4 | (Romania) Cristina Dinu | (Czech Republic) Michaela Bayerlová (Bulgaria) Gergana Topalova | (Greece) Valentini Grammatikopoulou (United States) Jessie Aney (United States) Katerina Stewart (Romania) Anca Todoni |
| June 5 | Kuršumlijska Banja, Serbia; Clay; W25; Singles and doubles draws | (Greece) Valentini Grammatikopoulou; Sofya Lansere; 6–3, 6–2 | (Argentina) Jazmín Ortenzi; Ekaterina Reyngold | (Czech Republic) Michaela Bayerlová (Bulgaria) Gergana Topalova | (Greece) Valentini Grammatikopoulou (United States) Jessie Aney (United States) Katerina Stewart (Romania) Anca Todoni |
| June 5 | Daegu, South Korea; Hard; W25; Singles and doubles draws | (South Korea) Park So-hyun; 2–6, 6–2, 6–1 | (South Korea) Kim Da-bin | (Australia) Destanee Aiava (Japan) Kyōka Okamura | (Indonesia) Priska Madelyn Nugroho (Chinese Taipei) Lee Ya-hsuan (Chinese Taipei) Liang En-shuo (Australia) Kaylah McPhee |
| June 5 | Daegu, South Korea; Hard; W25; Singles and doubles draws | (South Korea) Park So-hyun (Hong Kong) Cody Wong; 4–6, 7–6^{(7–2)}, [14–12] | (Chinese Taipei) Cho I-hsuan (Chinese Taipei) Cho Yi-Tsen | (Australia) Destanee Aiava (Japan) Kyōka Okamura | (Indonesia) Priska Madelyn Nugroho (Chinese Taipei) Lee Ya-hsuan (Chinese Taipei) Liang En-shuo (Australia) Kaylah McPhee |
| June 5 | Banja Luka, Bosnia and Herzegovina; Clay; W15; Singles and doubles draws | (Bosnia and Herzegovina) Suana Tucaković; 6–4, 5–7, 6–2 | (Switzerland) Katerina Tsygourova | (Australia) Nina Alibalić (Finland) Laura Hietaranta | (Poland) Ada Piestrzyńska (Germany) Antonia Schmidt (Serbia) Jana Bojović (Bosnia and Herzegovina) Laura Radaković |
| June 5 | Banja Luka, Bosnia and Herzegovina; Clay; W15; Singles and doubles draws | (Poland) Ada Piestrzyńska (Ukraine) Daria Yesypchuk; 6–1, 7–5 | (Romania) Iulia Andreea Ionescu (Romania) Anastasia Safta | (Australia) Nina Alibalić (Finland) Laura Hietaranta | (Poland) Ada Piestrzyńska (Germany) Antonia Schmidt (Serbia) Jana Bojović (Bosnia and Herzegovina) Laura Radaković |
| June 5 | Kashiwa, Japan; Hard; W15; Singles and doubles draws | (Japan) Aoi Ito; 6–4, 6–1 | (Japan) Kisa Yoshioka | (Japan) Mao Mushika (Japan) Honoka Kobayashi | (Japan) Lisa-Marie Rioux (Chinese Taipei) Tsao Chia-yi (Japan) Anri Nagata (Japan) Shiho Akita |
| June 5 | Kashiwa, Japan; Hard; W15; Singles and doubles draws | (Japan) Ayumi Miyamoto (Japan) Lisa-Marie Rioux; 7–6^{(10–8)}, 6–2 | (Japan) Rinko Matsuda (Japan) Mao Mushika | (Japan) Mao Mushika (Japan) Honoka Kobayashi | (Japan) Lisa-Marie Rioux (Chinese Taipei) Tsao Chia-yi (Japan) Anri Nagata (Japan) Shiho Akita |
| June 5 | Kočevje, Slovenia; Clay; W15; Singles and doubles draws | Anna Zyryanova; 6–1, 6–4 | (Peru) Anastasia Iamachkine | (Bulgaria) Julia Stamatova (Germany) Jantje Tilbürger | (Latvia) Anna Ozerova (Poland) Ania Hertel (Czech Republic) Lucie Urbanová (Italy) Enola Chiesa |
| June 5 | Kočevje, Slovenia; Clay; W15; Singles and doubles draws | (Romania) Ștefana Lazăr (Italy) Vittoria Modesti; 4–6, 7–5, [10–3] | (Latvia) Margarita Ignatjeva (Latvia) Anna Ozerova | (Bulgaria) Julia Stamatova (Germany) Jantje Tilbürger | (Latvia) Anna Ozerova (Poland) Ania Hertel (Czech Republic) Lucie Urbanová (Italy) Enola Chiesa |
| June 5 | Monastir, Tunisia; Hard; W15; Singles and doubles draws | (Germany) Natalia Siedliska; 6–3, 6–2 | (United Kingdom) Kristina Paskauskas | (Romania) Vanessa Popa Teiușanu (Spain) Lucía Llinares Domingo | (Greece) Magdalini Adaloglou (France) Emmanuelle Girard (Finland) Ella Haavisto; Elizaveta Shebekina |
| June 5 | Monastir, Tunisia; Hard; W15; Singles and doubles draws | (Sweden) Julita Saner (Germany) Natalia Siedliska; 6–4, 6–2 | (France) Alyssa Réguer (Italy) Beatrice Stagno | (Romania) Vanessa Popa Teiușanu (Spain) Lucía Llinares Domingo | (Greece) Magdalini Adaloglou (France) Emmanuelle Girard (Finland) Ella Haavisto; Elizaveta Shebekina |
| June 5 | Nakhon Si Thammarat, Thailand; Hard; W15; Singles and doubles draws | (United States) Dasha Ivanova; 7–6^{(7–3)}, 1–6, 6–3 | (Thailand) Patcharin Cheapchandej | (Kazakhstan) Aruzhan Sagandikova (Thailand) Anchisa Chanta | (Japan) Haruna Arakawa (Thailand) Salakthip Ounmuang (China) Liu Yanni (Hong Kong) Wu Ho-ching |
| June 5 | Nakhon Si Thammarat, Thailand; Hard; W15; Singles and doubles draws | (Thailand) Anchisa Chanta (Thailand) Patcharin Cheapchandej; 6–4, 4–6, [10–6] | (Israel) Nicole Khirin (Australia) Sara Nayar | (Kazakhstan) Aruzhan Sagandikova (Thailand) Anchisa Chanta | (Japan) Haruna Arakawa (Thailand) Salakthip Ounmuang (China) Liu Yanni (Hong Kong) Wu Ho-ching |
| June 5 | San Diego, United States; Hard; W15; Singles and doubles draws | (China) Tian Fangran; 6–1, 6–2 | (United States) Aspen Schuman | (United States) Samantha Crawford (United States) Nikki Redelijk | (United States) Taylor Johnson (United States) Malaika Rapolu (United States) Katherine Hui (United States) Haley Giavara |
| June 5 | San Diego, United States; Hard; W15; Singles and doubles draws | (United States) Kimmi Hance (China) Tian Fangran; 3–6, 6–1, [11–9] | (United States) Malaika Rapolu (Ukraine) Anita Sahdiieva | (United States) Samantha Crawford (United States) Nikki Redelijk | (United States) Taylor Johnson (United States) Malaika Rapolu (United States) Katherine Hui (United States) Haley Giavara |
| June 12 | BMW Roma Cup; Rome, Italy; Clay; W60; Singles – Doubles | (Croatia) Petra Marčinko; 6–2, 6–2 | (Italy) Giorgia Pedone | (Italy) Silvia Ambrosio (Greece) Sapfo Sakellaridi | (Italy) Anna Turati (Argentina) Guillermina Naya (Brazil) Gabriela Cé (Australia) Astra Sharma |
| June 12 | BMW Roma Cup; Rome, Italy; Clay; W60; Singles – Doubles | (Italy) Angelica Moratelli (Italy) Camilla Rosatello; 3–6, 6–0, [10–7] | (Romania) Oana Gavrilă (Greece) Sapfo Sakellaridi | (Italy) Silvia Ambrosio (Greece) Sapfo Sakellaridi | (Italy) Anna Turati (Argentina) Guillermina Naya (Brazil) Gabriela Cé (Australia) Astra Sharma |
| June 12 | Open de Biarritz; Biarritz, France; Clay; W60; Singles – Doubles | (France) Fiona Ferro; 7–5, 6–3 | (Turkey) İpek Öz | (Hungary) Tímea Babos (Spain) Carlota Martínez Círez | (France) Margaux Rouvroy (France) Amandine Hesse (Serbia) Lola Radivojević (France) Tessah Andrianjafitrimo |
| June 12 | Open de Biarritz; Biarritz, France; Clay; W60; Singles – Doubles | (Poland) Weronika Falkowska (Poland) Katarzyna Kawa; 7–6^{(7–2)}, 7–5 | (Switzerland) Conny Perrin (Czech Republic) Anna Sisková | (Hungary) Tímea Babos (Spain) Carlota Martínez Círez | (France) Margaux Rouvroy (France) Amandine Hesse (Serbia) Lola Radivojević (France) Tessah Andrianjafitrimo |
| June 12 | Open ITF Arcadis Brezo Osuna; Madrid, Spain; Hard; W60; Singles – Doubles | Tatiana Prozorova; 6–3, 6–1 | (Spain) Marta Soriano Santiago | (United States) Jessica Failla (China) Bai Zhuoxuan | (Bosnia and Herzegovina) Dea Herdželaš (Japan) Sakura Hosogi (Turkey) Berfu Cengiz (United States) Robin Montgomery |
| June 12 | Open ITF Arcadis Brezo Osuna; Madrid, Spain; Hard; W60; Singles – Doubles | (United States) Makenna Jones (United States) Jamie Loeb; 6–4, 5–7, [10–6] | (Australia) Destanee Aiava (Turkey) Berfu Cengiz | (United States) Jessica Failla (China) Bai Zhuoxuan | (Bosnia and Herzegovina) Dea Herdželaš (Japan) Sakura Hosogi (Turkey) Berfu Cengiz (United States) Robin Montgomery |
| June 12 | Agel Říčany Open; Říčany, Czech Republic; Clay; W60; Singles – Doubles | (United States) Elvina Kalieva; 7–6^{(7–2)}, 6–0 | (Japan) Misaki Doi | (Czech Republic) Tereza Valentová (Romania) Gabriela Lee | (Brazil) Laura Pigossi (Australia) Seone Mendez (Slovenia) Veronika Erjavec (Czech Republic) Aneta Kučmová |
| June 12 | Agel Říčany Open; Říčany, Czech Republic; Clay; W60; Singles – Doubles | (Czech Republic) Karolína Kubáňová (Czech Republic) Aneta Kučmová; 4–6, 6–3, [10–4] | (Slovenia) Veronika Erjavec (Czech Republic) Dominika Šalková | (Czech Republic) Tereza Valentová (Romania) Gabriela Lee | (Brazil) Laura Pigossi (Australia) Seone Mendez (Slovenia) Veronika Erjavec (Czech Republic) Aneta Kučmová |
| June 12 | Palmetto Pro Open; Sumter, United States; Hard; W60; Singles – Doubles | (Ukraine) Yulia Starodubtseva; 6–7^{(5–7)}, 7–5, 6–4 | (India) Karman Kaur Thandi | (United States) Liv Hovde (United States) Maria Mateas | (Canada) Stacey Fung (United States) Haley Giavara (United States) Victoria Hu (United States) Grace Min |
| June 12 | Palmetto Pro Open; Sumter, United States; Hard; W60; Singles – Doubles | (United States) Maria Mateas (United States) Anna Rogers; 6–4, 6–7^{(3–7)}, [10–6] | (United States) McCartney Kessler (Ukraine) Yulia Starodubtseva | (United States) Liv Hovde (United States) Maria Mateas | (Canada) Stacey Fung (United States) Haley Giavara (United States) Victoria Hu (United States) Grace Min |
| June 12 | Colorado Springs, United States; Hard; W25; Singles and doubles draws | (Serbia) Katarina Kozarov; 6–3, 6–1 | (United States) Allie Kiick | (United States) Rhiann Newborn (Japan) Saki Imamura | (Canada) Jessica Luisa Alsola (United States) Gabriella Price (United States) Ayana Akli (United States) Danielle Willson |
| June 12 | Colorado Springs, United States; Hard; W25; Singles and doubles draws | (United States) Eryn Cayetano (United States) Maribella Zamarripa; 6–4, 6–2 | (United States) Lauren Friedman; Alina Shcherbinina | (United States) Rhiann Newborn (Japan) Saki Imamura | (Canada) Jessica Luisa Alsola (United States) Gabriella Price (United States) Ayana Akli (United States) Danielle Willson |
| June 12 | Guimarães, Portugal; Hard; W25; Singles and doubles draws | (Czech Republic) Gabriela Knutson; 6–3, 6–4 | (United States) Madison Sieg | (United Kingdom) Katy Dunne (Mexico) Ana Sofía Sánchez | Ekaterina Ovcharenko (Portugal) Francisca Jorge (Spain) Georgina García Pérez (Austria) Tamira Paszek |
| June 12 | Guimarães, Portugal; Hard; W25; Singles and doubles draws | (Spain) Georgina García Pérez (Australia) Petra Hule; 6–4, 7–5 | (Portugal) Francisca Jorge (Portugal) Matilde Jorge | (United Kingdom) Katy Dunne (Mexico) Ana Sofía Sánchez | Ekaterina Ovcharenko (Portugal) Francisca Jorge (Spain) Georgina García Pérez (Austria) Tamira Paszek |
| June 12 | Tainan, Chinese Taipei; Clay; W25; Singles and doubles draws | (Chinese Taipei) Yang Ya-yi; 6–3, 6–1 | (Chinese Taipei) Lee Ya-hsuan | (Romania) Irina Fetecău; Daria Lodikova | (Australia) Kaylah McPhee (Chinese Taipei) Cho I-hsuan (Netherlands) Stéphanie Visscher (Japan) Ayano Shimizu |
| June 12 | Tainan, Chinese Taipei; Clay; W25; Singles and doubles draws | (Belgium) Sofia Costoulas (Chinese Taipei) Li Yu-yun; 6–4, 6–4 | (Chinese Taipei) Lee Ya-hsin (Chinese Taipei) Lee Ya-hsuan | (Romania) Irina Fetecău; Daria Lodikova | (Australia) Kaylah McPhee (Chinese Taipei) Cho I-hsuan (Netherlands) Stéphanie Visscher (Japan) Ayano Shimizu |
| June 12 | Kawaguchi, Japan; Hard; W15; Singles and doubles draws | (Japan) Natsuki Yoshimoto; 6–2, 6–0 | (Japan) Nana Kawagishi | (Japan) Mao Mushika (Japan) Ayumi Koshiishi | (Japan) Aoi Ito (Japan) Mai Kandori (Japan) Himari Sato (Japan) Yuika Ikawa |
| June 12 | Kawaguchi, Japan; Hard; W15; Singles and doubles draws | (Japan) Aoi Ito (Japan) Miyu Nakashima; 6–4, 6–4 | (Japan) Ayumi Miyamoto (Japan) Lisa-Marie Rioux | (Japan) Mao Mushika (Japan) Ayumi Koshiishi | (Japan) Aoi Ito (Japan) Mai Kandori (Japan) Himari Sato (Japan) Yuika Ikawa |
| June 12 | Nakhon Si Thammarat, Thailand; Hard; W15; Singles and doubles draws | (Israel) Nicole Khirin; 5–7, 6–4, 6–2 | (Thailand) Anchisa Chanta | (India) Humera Baharmus (Thailand) Patcharin Cheapchandej | (Japan) Haruna Arakawa (Kazakhstan) Aruzhan Sagandikova (Japan) Natsuho Arakawa (Australia) Sara Nayar |
| June 12 | Nakhon Si Thammarat, Thailand; Hard; W15; Singles and doubles draws | (Thailand) Anchisa Chanta (Thailand) Patcharin Cheapchandej; 6–1, 7–6^{(7–4)} | (Australia) Sara Nayar (New Zealand) Vivian Yang | (India) Humera Baharmus (Thailand) Patcharin Cheapchandej | (Japan) Haruna Arakawa (Kazakhstan) Aruzhan Sagandikova (Japan) Natsuho Arakawa (Australia) Sara Nayar |
| June 12 | Tianjin, China; Hard; W15; Singles and doubles draws | (China) Yao Xinxin; 6–3, 7–5 | (China) Yang Yidi | (China) Zheng Wushuang (China) Wang Meiling | (China) Huang Jiaqi (China) Han Jiangxue (China) Liu Fangzhou (China) Zhang Ziye |
| June 12 | Tianjin, China; Hard; W15; Singles and doubles draws | (China) Feng Shuo (China) Zheng Wushuang; 6–0, 6–2 | (China) Han Jiangxue (China) Huang Jiaqi | (China) Zheng Wushuang (China) Wang Meiling | (China) Huang Jiaqi (China) Han Jiangxue (China) Liu Fangzhou (China) Zhang Ziye |
| June 12 | Kranjska Gora, Slovenia; Clay; W15; Singles and doubles draws | (Romania) Anca Todoni; 6–1, 6–2 | (Switzerland) Paula Cembranos | (Slovenia) Živa Falkner (Switzerland) Katerina Tsygourova | (Germany) Fabienne Gettwart (Slovenia) Ana Lanišek (Italy) Melania Delai; Anna Zyryanova |
| June 12 | Kranjska Gora, Slovenia; Clay; W15; Singles and doubles draws | (Romania) Anca Todoni (Switzerland) Katerina Tsygourova; 6–1, 6–0 | (Switzerland) Paula Cembranos (Estonia) Liisa Varul | (Slovenia) Živa Falkner (Switzerland) Katerina Tsygourova | (Germany) Fabienne Gettwart (Slovenia) Ana Lanišek (Italy) Melania Delai; Anna Zyryanova |
| June 12 | Monastir, Tunisia; Hard; W15; Singles and doubles draws | (Germany) Anja Wildgruber; 6–2, 7–5 | (Poland) Joanna Zawadzka | (Mexico) Lya Isabel Fernández Olivares (China) Chen Mengyi | (United Kingdom) Kristina Paskauskas (United States) Teja Tirunelveli (Sweden) Julita Saner (France) Marie Villet |
| June 12 | Monastir, Tunisia; Hard; W15; Singles and doubles draws | (Egypt) Yasmin Ezzat (Italy) Beatrice Stagno; 6–1, 6–4 | (Netherlands) Rikke de Koning (Netherlands) Marente Sijbesma | (Mexico) Lya Isabel Fernández Olivares (China) Chen Mengyi | (United Kingdom) Kristina Paskauskas (United States) Teja Tirunelveli (Sweden) Julita Saner (France) Marie Villet |
| June 12 | Kuršumlijska Banja, Serbia; Clay; W15; Singles and doubles draws | (Serbia) Anja Stanković; 6–2, 6–2 | (Romania) Carmen Andreea Herea | (Australia) Nina Alibalić (Argentina) Jazmín Ortenzi | (Serbia) Andjela Lazarević (United States) Katerina Stewart (Serbia) Natalija Senić (Peru) Anastasia Iamachkine |
| June 12 | Kuršumlijska Banja, Serbia; Clay; W15; Singles and doubles draws | Doubles competition was abandoned | | (Australia) Nina Alibalić (Argentina) Jazmín Ortenzi | (Serbia) Andjela Lazarević (United States) Katerina Stewart (Serbia) Natalija Senić (Peru) Anastasia Iamachkine |
| June 12 | Norges-la-Ville, France; Hard; W15; Singles and doubles draws | (Turkey) Melisa Ercan; 6–7^{(8–10)}, 6–0, 7–6^{(8–6)} | (Belgium) Amelie Van Impe | (Spain) Berta Passola (Germany) Emily Welker | (France) Chloé Noël (Belgium) Tilwith Di Girolami (Switzerland) Naïma Karamoko (France) Sophia Biolay |
| June 12 | Norges-la-Ville, France; Hard; W15; Singles and doubles draws | (Belgium) Tilwith Di Girolami (Belgium) Amelie Van Impe; 6–2, 6–2 | (France) Marine Szostak (France) Lucie Wargnier | (Spain) Berta Passola (Germany) Emily Welker | (France) Chloé Noël (Belgium) Tilwith Di Girolami (Switzerland) Naïma Karamoko (France) Sophia Biolay |
| June 12 | San Diego, United States; Clay; W15; Singles and doubles draws | (United States) Sara Daavettila; 7–6^{(7–3)}, 7–5 | (South Africa) Chanel Simmonds | (United States) Kimmi Hance (United States) Kate Fakih | (United States) Malaika Rapolu (United States) Kylie McKenzie (United States) Katherine Hui (Paraguay) Leyla Fiorella Brítez Risso |
| June 12 | San Diego, United States; Clay; W15; Singles and doubles draws | (United States) Sara Daavettila (United States) Katherine Hui; 7–6^{(7–4)}, 6–4 | (United States) Malaika Rapolu (Ukraine) Anita Sahdiieva | (United States) Kimmi Hance (United States) Kate Fakih | (United States) Malaika Rapolu (United States) Kylie McKenzie (United States) Katherine Hui (Paraguay) Leyla Fiorella Brítez Risso |
| June 19 | Ilkley Trophy; Ilkley, United Kingdom; Grass; W100; Singles – Doubles | (Sweden) Mirjam Björklund; 6–4, 7–5 | (United States) Emma Navarro | (United Kingdom) Sonay Kartal (Hungary) Dalma Gálfi | (Japan) Nao Hibino (Spain) Aliona Bolsova (Colombia) Emiliana Arango (Ukraine) Daria Snigur |
| June 19 | Ilkley Trophy; Ilkley, United Kingdom; Grass; W100; Singles – Doubles | (Japan) Nao Hibino (Serbia) Natalija Stevanović; 7–6^{(12–10)}, 7–6^{(7–5)} | (Poland) Maja Chwalińska (Czech Republic) Jesika Malečková | (United Kingdom) Sonay Kartal (Hungary) Dalma Gálfi | (Japan) Nao Hibino (Spain) Aliona Bolsova (Colombia) Emiliana Arango (Ukraine) Daria Snigur |
| June 19 | Ystad, Sweden; Clay; W40; Singles and doubles draws | (Turkey) İpek Öz; 6–1, 6–3 | (Australia) Astra Sharma | (Poland) Katarzyna Kawa (United States) Elvina Kalieva | (Estonia) Kaia Kanepi (Spain) Irene Burillo Escorihuela (Germany) Julia Middendorf (Hungary) Réka Luca Jani |
| June 19 | Ystad, Sweden; Clay; W40; Singles and doubles draws | (Australia) Astra Sharma (Ukraine) Valeriya Strakhova; 4–6, 7–6^{(7–3)}, [11–9] | (Switzerland) Jenny Dürst (Sweden) Fanny Östlund | (Poland) Katarzyna Kawa (United States) Elvina Kalieva | (Estonia) Kaia Kanepi (Spain) Irene Burillo Escorihuela (Germany) Julia Middendorf (Hungary) Réka Luca Jani |
| June 19 | Tauste, Spain; Hard; W25+H; Singles and doubles draws | (Australia) Lizette Cabrera; 6–1, 6–3 | (Spain) Rosa Vicens Mas | (United States) Alana Smith (China) Gao Xinyu | (Japan) Naho Sato (Australia) Destanee Aiava (Australia) Talia Gibson (Latvia) Diāna Marcinkēviča |
| June 19 | Tauste, Spain; Hard; W25+H; Singles and doubles draws | (United States) Makenna Jones (United States) Jamie Loeb; 6–2, 5–7, [10–6] | (China) Gao Xinyu; Ekaterina Ovcharenko | (United States) Alana Smith (China) Gao Xinyu | (Japan) Naho Sato (Australia) Destanee Aiava (Australia) Talia Gibson (Latvia) Diāna Marcinkēviča |
| June 19 | Tainan, Chinese Taipei; Clay; W25; Singles and doubles draws | (Chinese Taipei) Yang Ya-yi; 6–2, 6–1 | (Chinese Taipei) Lee Pei-chi | (Chinese Taipei) Cho Yi-tsen (Chinese Taipei) Tsao Chia-yi | (Switzerland) Marie Mettraux (Japan) Ayano Shimizu (Japan) Erika Sema; Daria Lodikova |
| June 19 | Tainan, Chinese Taipei; Clay; W25; Singles and doubles draws | (Chinese Taipei) Tsao Chia-yi (Chinese Taipei) Yang Ya-yi; 6–2, 6–2 | (New Zealand) Monique Barry (Chinese Taipei) Lee Ya-hsin | (Chinese Taipei) Cho Yi-tsen (Chinese Taipei) Tsao Chia-yi | (Switzerland) Marie Mettraux (Japan) Ayano Shimizu (Japan) Erika Sema; Daria Lodikova |
| June 19 | Santo Domingo, Dominican Republic; Clay; W25; Singles and doubles draws | (Argentina) Martina Capurro Taborda; 6–2, 6–4 | (Switzerland) Leonie Küng | (Mexico) Ana Sofía Sánchez; Jana Kolodynska | Ksenia Laskutova (United States) DJ Bennett (Germany) Jasmin Jebawy (Colombia) María Herazo González |
| June 19 | Santo Domingo, Dominican Republic; Clay; W25; Singles and doubles draws | (Colombia) María Herazo González; Ksenia Laskutova; 2–6, 6–4, [11–9] | (Mexico) Ana Sofía Sánchez (Ukraine) Yuliia Starodubtseva | (Mexico) Ana Sofía Sánchez; Jana Kolodynska | Ksenia Laskutova (United States) DJ Bennett (Germany) Jasmin Jebawy (Colombia) María Herazo González |
| June 19 | Wichita, United States; Hard; W25; Singles and doubles draws | (Canada) Stacey Fung; 6–3, 6–2 | (United States) Fiona Crawley | (United States) McCartney Kessler (Romania) Gabriela Lee | (United States) Grace Min (United States) Ashley Lahey (United States) Rasheeda McAdoo; Veronika Miroshnichenko |
| June 19 | Wichita, United States; Hard; W25; Singles and doubles draws | (United States) Reese Brantmeier (United States) Maria Mateas; 6–2, 6–4 | (United States) Ava Markham; Alina Shcherbinina | (United States) McCartney Kessler (Romania) Gabriela Lee | (United States) Grace Min (United States) Ashley Lahey (United States) Rasheeda McAdoo; Veronika Miroshnichenko |
| June 19 | Tianjin, China; Hard; W15; Singles and doubles draws | (China) Zheng Wushuang; 6–3, 6–2 | (China) Shi Han | (China) Dong Na (China) Zhao Xichen | (China) Zeng Zixuan; Valery Gynina (China) Tang Qianhui (China) Wang Meiling |
| June 19 | Tianjin, China; Hard; W15; Singles and doubles draws | (China) Han Jiangxue (China) Huang Yujia; 6–3, 6–1 | Anastasia Sukhotina (New Zealand) Vivian Yang | (China) Dong Na (China) Zhao Xichen | (China) Zeng Zixuan; Valery Gynina (China) Tang Qianhui (China) Wang Meiling |
| June 19 | Bucharest, Romania; Clay; W15; Singles and doubles draws | (Romania) Anca Todoni; 6–4, 6–0 | (Romania) Ștefania Bojică | (Romania) Lavinia Tănăsie (Romania) Mara Gae | (Slovakia) Nina Vargová (Romania) Patricia Maria Țig (United Kingdom) Sarah Tatu (Romania) Alexia Iulia Marginean |
| June 19 | Bucharest, Romania; Clay; W15; Singles and doubles draws | (Romania) Ștefania Bojică (Romania) Mara Gae; 6–3, 6–4 | (Romania) Ilinca Amariei (Czech Republic) Linda Ševčíková | (Romania) Lavinia Tănăsie (Romania) Mara Gae | (Slovakia) Nina Vargová (Romania) Patricia Maria Țig (United Kingdom) Sarah Tatu (Romania) Alexia Iulia Marginean |
| June 19 | Kuršumlijska Banja, Serbia; Clay; W15; Singles and doubles draws | (Greece) Michaela Laki; 6–3, 6–2 | (Serbia) Andjela Lazarević | (Peru) Anastasia Iamachkine (Brazil) Ana Candiotto | (France) Tiphanie Lemaître; Polina Leykina (Argentina) Jazmín Ortenzi (Japan) Mana Kawamura |
| June 19 | Kuršumlijska Banja, Serbia; Clay; W15; Singles and doubles draws | (Greece) Eleni Christofi (Serbia) Natalija Senić; 7–6^{(7–5)}, 6–3 | (Brazil) Ana Candiotto (Peru) Anastasia Iamachkine | (Peru) Anastasia Iamachkine (Brazil) Ana Candiotto | (France) Tiphanie Lemaître; Polina Leykina (Argentina) Jazmín Ortenzi (Japan) Mana Kawamura |
| June 19 | Gdańsk, Poland; Clay; W15; Singles and doubles draws | (Germany) Carolina Kuhl; 2–6, 6–2, 7–6^{(7–5)} | (Poland) Gina Feistel | (Slovakia) Eszter Méri (Poland) Stefania Rogozińska-Dzik | (Germany) Helena Buchwald (Slovakia) Salma Drugdová (Czech Republic) Denisa Hindová (Sweden) Julita Saner |
| June 19 | Gdańsk, Poland; Clay; W15; Singles and doubles draws | (Ukraine) Maryna Kolb (Ukraine) Nadiya Kolb; 6–0, 6–1 | (Poland) Gina Feistel (Poland) Marcelina Podlińska | (Slovakia) Eszter Méri (Poland) Stefania Rogozińska-Dzik | (Germany) Helena Buchwald (Slovakia) Salma Drugdová (Czech Republic) Denisa Hindová (Sweden) Julita Saner |
| June 19 | Los Angeles, United States; Hard; W15; Singles and doubles draws | (China) Tian Fangran; 6–2, 6–1 | (Canada) Jessica Luisa Alsola | (United States) Taylor Johnson (United States) Kimmi Hance | (United States) Aspen Schuman (United States) Nikki Redelijk (United States) Amelia Honer (Vietnam) Savanna Lý-Nguyễn |
| June 19 | Los Angeles, United States; Hard; W15; Singles and doubles draws | (Japan) Rinon Okuwaki (China) Tian Fangran; 7–5, 6–3 | (Mexico) María Fernanda Navarro (United States) Brandy Walker | (United States) Taylor Johnson (United States) Kimmi Hance | (United States) Aspen Schuman (United States) Nikki Redelijk (United States) Amelia Honer (Vietnam) Savanna Lý-Nguyễn |
| June 19 | Monastir, Tunisia; Hard; W15; Singles and doubles draws | (Turkey) Melisa Ercan; 6–3, 6–3 | (Italy) Beatrice Stagno | (Mexico) Lya Isabel Fernández Olivares (Australia) Stefani Webb | (France) Caroline Romeo (Egypt) Lamis Alhussein Abdel Aziz (Brazil) Luana Plaza Araújo (Italy) Giulia Crescenzi |
| June 19 | Monastir, Tunisia; Hard; W15; Singles and doubles draws | (Germany) Selina Dal (Germany) Anja Wildgruber; 6–3, 6–4 | (China) Chen Mengyi; Hanna Vinahradava | (Mexico) Lya Isabel Fernández Olivares (Australia) Stefani Webb | (France) Caroline Romeo (Egypt) Lamis Alhussein Abdel Aziz (Brazil) Luana Plaza Araújo (Italy) Giulia Crescenzi |
| June 19 | Buenos Aires, Argentina; Clay; W15; Singles and doubles draws | (Ecuador) Mell Reasco; 6–3, 6–2 | (Peru) Romina Ccuno | (Paraguay) Ana Paula Neffa de los Ríos (Argentina) Guillermina Naya | (Peru) Michela Castro Zunino (Argentina) Candela Vázquez (Chile) Fernanda Labraña (Argentina) Sol Ailin Larraya Guidi |
| June 19 | Buenos Aires, Argentina; Clay; W15; Singles and doubles draws | (Ecuador) Mell Reasco (Ecuador) Camila Romero; 6–2, 6–4 | (Chile) Alessandra Cáceres (Argentina) Rocío Daniela Merlo | (Paraguay) Ana Paula Neffa de los Ríos (Argentina) Guillermina Naya | (Peru) Michela Castro Zunino (Argentina) Candela Vázquez (Chile) Fernanda Labraña (Argentina) Sol Ailin Larraya Guidi |
| June 26 | Palma del Río, Spain; Hard; W40; Singles and doubles draws | Valeria Savinykh; 7–5, 6–3 | (France) Harmony Tan | (Austria) Tamira Paszek vs (Spain) Eva Guerrero Álvarez | (United States) Makenna Jones (Philippines) Alex Eala (Switzerland) Valentina Ryser (Japan) Sayaka Ishii |
| June 26 | Palma del Río, Spain; Hard; W40; Singles and doubles draws | (Venezuela) Andrea Gámiz (United States) Sofia Sewing; 6–3, 6–2 | (United States) Robin Anderson (Australia) Elysia Bolton | (Austria) Tamira Paszek vs (Spain) Eva Guerrero Álvarez | (United States) Makenna Jones (Philippines) Alex Eala (Switzerland) Valentina Ryser (Japan) Sayaka Ishii |
| June 26 | Hong Kong, Hong Kong; Hard; W25; Singles and Doubles Draws | (Chinese Taipei) Yang Ya-yi; 1–6, 6–2, 6–1 | (Hong Kong) Eudice Chong | (Japan) Haruka Kaji (Thailand) Lanlana Tararudee | (Japan) Aoi Ito; Anastasia Gasanova; Anastasia Kovaleva (Japan) Saki Imamura |
| June 26 | Hong Kong, Hong Kong; Hard; W25; Singles and Doubles Draws | (Japan) Aoi Ito (Japan) Erika Sema; 5–7, 6–3, [10–4] | (Japan) Momoko Kobori (Japan) Ayano Shimizu | (Japan) Haruka Kaji (Thailand) Lanlana Tararudee | (Japan) Aoi Ito; Anastasia Gasanova; Anastasia Kovaleva (Japan) Saki Imamura |
| June 26 | Santo Domingo, Dominican Republic; Clay; W25; Singles and Doubles Draws | (Argentina) Martina Capurro Taborda; 3–6, 6–0, 6–0 | (Bulgaria) Gergana Topalova | (Morocco) Yasmine Kabbaj (Argentina) Solana Sierra | (Spain) Carlota Martínez Círez (Sweden) Fanny Östlund; Jana Kolodynska (Canada) Cadence Brace |
| June 26 | Santo Domingo, Dominican Republic; Clay; W25; Singles and Doubles Draws | (Switzerland) Leonie Küng; Ksenia Laskutova; 6–4, 3–6, [10–3] | (Spain) Noelia Bouzó Zanotti (Argentina) Martina Capurro Taborda | (Morocco) Yasmine Kabbaj (Argentina) Solana Sierra | (Spain) Carlota Martínez Círez (Sweden) Fanny Östlund; Jana Kolodynska (Canada) Cadence Brace |
| June 26 | Périgueux, France; Clay; W25; Singles and Doubles Draws | (Norway) Malene Helgø; 6–3, 6–3 | (Greece) Sapfo Sakellaridi | (Czech Republic) Anna Sisková (Germany) Ella Seidel | Anastasia Tikhonova (France) Margaux Rouvroy (France) Tessah Andrianjafitrimo (France) Astrid Lew Yan Foon |
| June 26 | Périgueux, France; Clay; W25; Singles and Doubles Draws | (Greece) Sapfo Sakellaridi (Czech Republic) Anna Sisková; 6–2, 6–1 | (Indonesia) Jessy Rompies (Australia) Olivia Tjandramulia | (Czech Republic) Anna Sisková (Germany) Ella Seidel | Anastasia Tikhonova (France) Margaux Rouvroy (France) Tessah Andrianjafitrimo (France) Astrid Lew Yan Foon |
| June 26 | Tarvisio, Italy; Clay; W25; Singles and Doubles Draws | (Croatia) Petra Marčinko; 6–1, 4–6, 6–2 | (Poland) Katarzyna Kawa | (Croatia) Tena Lukas (Italy) Silvia Ambrosio | (Italy) Arianna Zucchini (Italy) Anna Turati (Brazil) Gabriela Cé (Romania) Alexandra Ignatik |
| June 26 | Tarvisio, Italy; Clay; W25; Singles and Doubles Draws | (Slovenia) Veronika Erjavec (Czech Republic) Dominika Šalková; 6–0, 6–3 | (Slovenia) Nika Radišić (Bosnia and Herzegovina) Anita Wagner | (Croatia) Tena Lukas (Italy) Silvia Ambrosio | (Italy) Arianna Zucchini (Italy) Anna Turati (Brazil) Gabriela Cé (Romania) Alexandra Ignatik |
| June 26 | Kuršumlijska Banja, Serbia; Clay; W25; Singles and Doubles Draws | (Greece) Martha Matoula; 6–2, 7–6^{(7–2)} | (Romania) Anca Todoni | (Serbia) Anja Stanković (Slovenia) Živa Falkner | (Germany) Kathleen Kanev (Sweden) Kajsa Rinaldo Persson (Ukraine) Valeriya Strakhova (Croatia) Lea Bošković |
| June 26 | Kuršumlijska Banja, Serbia; Clay; W25; Singles and Doubles Draws | (Romania) Cristina Dinu (Ukraine) Valeriya Strakhova; 4–6, 6–2, [10–8] | Polina Leykina (Bulgaria) Julia Stamatova | (Serbia) Anja Stanković (Slovenia) Živa Falkner | (Germany) Kathleen Kanev (Sweden) Kajsa Rinaldo Persson (Ukraine) Valeriya Strakhova (Croatia) Lea Bošković |
| June 26 | Alkmaar, Netherlands; Clay; W15; Singles and Doubles Draws | (Hungary) Luca Udvardy; 6–1, 7–5 | (Sweden) Caijsa Hennemann | (Israel) Nicole Khirin (United States) Chiara Scholl | (Spain) Ariana Geerlings (Estonia) Maileen Nuudi (Netherlands) Britt du Pree (Germany) Katharina Hering |
| June 26 | Alkmaar, Netherlands; Clay; W15; Singles and Doubles Draws | (Belgium) Tilwith Di Girolami (United States) Chiara Scholl; 6–2, 6–1 | (Netherlands) Rose Marie Nijkamp (Netherlands) Isis Louise van den Broek | (Israel) Nicole Khirin (United States) Chiara Scholl | (Spain) Ariana Geerlings (Estonia) Maileen Nuudi (Netherlands) Britt du Pree (Germany) Katharina Hering |
| June 26 | Rosario, Argentina; Clay; W15; Singles and Doubles Draws | (Argentina) Guillermina Naya; 6–2, 6–0 | (Argentina) Sol Ailin Larraya Guidi | (Ecuador) Mell Reasco (Argentina) María Florencia Urrutia | (Ecuador) Camila Romero (United Kingdom) Alisha Reayer (Argentina) Carla Markus (Argentina) Luciana Blatter |
| June 26 | Rosario, Argentina; Clay; W15; Singles and Doubles Draws | (Argentina) Julieta Lara Estable (Argentina) Guillermina Naya; Walkover | (Ecuador) Mell Reasco (Ecuador) Camila Romero | (Ecuador) Mell Reasco (Argentina) María Florencia Urrutia | (Ecuador) Camila Romero (United Kingdom) Alisha Reayer (Argentina) Carla Markus (Argentina) Luciana Blatter |
| June 26 | Monastir, Tunisia; Hard; W15; Singles and Doubles Draws | (Egypt) Lamis Alhussein Abdel Aziz; 6–4, 6–0 | (Spain) Lucía Llinares Domingo | (Italy) Giulia Crescenzi (Poland) Weronika Ewald | (Australia) Lisa Mays (Germany) Anja Wildgruber (India) Tanisha Kashyap (France) Emmanuelle Girard |
| June 26 | Monastir, Tunisia; Hard; W15; Singles and Doubles Draws | (Spain) Lucía Llinares Domingo (France) Lola Marandel; 6–4, 7–6^{(7–5)} | Aglaya Fedorova (Australia) Lisa Mays | (Italy) Giulia Crescenzi (Poland) Weronika Ewald | (Australia) Lisa Mays (Germany) Anja Wildgruber (India) Tanisha Kashyap (France) Emmanuelle Girard |
| June 26 | Tianjin, China; Hard; W15; Singles and Doubles Draws | (China) Ren Yufei; 6–7^{(5–7)}, 6–1, 6–0 | Valery Gynina | (China) Dong Na (China) Wang Jiaqi | (China) Yao Xinxin (New Zealand) Vivian Yang (China) Jiang Zijun (China) Yang Yidi |
| June 26 | Tianjin, China; Hard; W15; Singles and Doubles Draws | (China) Ren Yufei (China) Shi Han; 6–1, 6–3 | (China) Cao Yajing (China) Huang Yujia | (China) Dong Na (China) Wang Jiaqi | (China) Yao Xinxin (New Zealand) Vivian Yang (China) Jiang Zijun (China) Yang Yidi |
| June 26 | Irvine, United States; Hard; W15; Singles and Doubles Draws | (United States) Haley Giavara; 6–1, 6–3 | (China) Lu Jiajing | (United States) Eryn Cayetano (United States) Katherine Hui | (United States) Brandy Walker (United States) Amelia Honer (United States) Danielle Willson (Canada) Alessia Cau |
| June 26 | Irvine, United States; Hard; W15; Singles and Doubles Draws | (United States) Haley Giavara (United States) Katherine Hui; 6–2, 6–4 | (United States) Eryn Cayetano (United States) Isabella Chhiv | (United States) Eryn Cayetano (United States) Katherine Hui | (United States) Brandy Walker (United States) Amelia Honer (United States) Danielle Willson (Canada) Alessia Cau |
