= 2023 The Women's Hospital Classic – Doubles =

Doubles
- 2023 The Women's Hospital Classic

Final
- Champion: Maria Kononova; Veronika Miroshnichenko
- Runner-up: (United States) McCartney Kessler (Ukraine) Yulia Starodubtseva
- Score: 6–3, 2–6, [10–8]

Events
Singles	Doubles
← 2022 ·	The Women's Hospital Classic	· 2024 →

Maria Kononova and Veronika Miroshnichenko won the doubles tournament at the 2023 The Women's Hospital Classic after defeating McCartney Kessler and Yulia Starodubtseva 6–3, 2–6, [10–8] in the final.

Kolie Allen and Ava Markham were the defending champions but chose not to defend their title.

== Seeds ==
1. (United States) Dalayna Hewitt / (United States) Christina Rosca (semifinals)
2. (United States) Ashley Lahey / (United States) Maribella Zamarripa (quarterfinals)
3. (Serbia) Katarina Kozarov / Maria Kozyreva (first round)
4. (United States) Robin Anderson / (Australia) Elysia Bolton (quarterfinals, withdrew)

== Draw ==
=== Key ===
- Q = Qualifier
- WC = Wild card
- LL = Lucky loser
- Alt = Alternate
- ITF = ITF entry
- PR = Protected ranking
- SR = Special ranking
- SE = Special exempt
- JE = Junior exempt
- JR = Junior Accelerator Programme entrant
- CO = College Accelerator Programme entrant
- NG = Next Gen Accelerator Program entrant
- w/o = Walkover
- r = Retired
- d = Defaulted

=== Finals ===
First round
1	(United States) D Hewitt (United States) C Rosca	6	4	[14]
(Mexico) MF Navarro Oliva (India) S Yamalapalli	3	6	[12]
(United States) A Glatch (Ukraine) H Poznikhirenko	6	3	[9]
(United States) M Brengle (United States) H Inoue	2	6	[11]
3	(Serbia) K Kozarov; M Kozyreva	6	3	[7]
(United States) M Kessler (Ukraine) Y Starodubtseva	2	6	[10]
(United States) S Crawford (United States) A Kiick	6	7
(United States) V Osuigwe (United States) W Osuigwe	0	5
WC	(United States) C Boyer (United States) E Gu	1	1
M Kononova; V Miroshnichenko	6	6
WC	(United States) E Eades (United States) E Myers	4	1
4	(United States) R Anderson (Australia) E Bolton	6	6
(United States) C Beck (United States) S Daavettila	6	7
WC	(United States) F Crawley (United States) C Tanguilig	3	5
(United States) S Chang (United States) K Shaffer
2	(United States) A Lahey (United States) M Zamarripa	w/o

Quarterfinals
1	(United States) D Hewitt (United States) C Rosca	6^{5}	6	[10]
(United States) M Brengle (United States) H Inoue	7^{7}	4	[3]
(United States) M Kessler (Ukraine) Y Starodubtseva	7^{7}	6
(United States) S Crawford (United States) A Kiick	6^{7}	2
M Kononova; V Miroshnichenko	w/o
4	(United States) R Anderson (Australia) E Bolton
(United States) C Beck (United States) S Daavettila	2	6	[11]
2	(United States) A Lahey (United States) M Zamarripa	6	3	[9]

Semifinals
1	(United States) D Hewitt (United States) C Rosca	7^{7}	6^{3}	[9]
(United States) M Kessler (Ukraine) Y Starodubtseva	6^{3}	7^{7}	[11]
M Kononova; V Miroshnichenko	4	6	[10]
(United States) C Beck (United States) S Daavettila	6	2	[5]

Final
(United States) M Kessler (Ukraine) Y Starodubtseva	3	6	[8]
M Kononova; V Miroshnichenko	6	2	[10]
