= 2025 The Women's Hospital Classic – Doubles =

Doubles
- 2025 The Women's Hospital Classic

Final
- Champions: (Netherlands) Arianne Hartono (India) Prarthana Thombare
- Runners-up: (United States) Ayana Akli (United States) Victoria Osuigwe
- Score: 6-3, 6-3

Events
| Singles | Doubles |
| ← 2024 · | The Women's Hospital Classic | · 2026 → |

Alicia Herrero Liñana and Melany Krywoj were the defending champions, but chose not to participate.

Arianne Hartono and Prarthana Thombare won the title, defeating Akli and Osuigwe in the final, 6–3, 6-3.

== Seeds ==
1. (United States) Carmen Corley / (United States) Ivana Corley (semifinals)
2. (Netherlands) Arianne Hartono / (India) Prarthana Thombare (champions)
3. (Canada) Kayla Cross / (United States) Alana Smith (semifinals)
4. (Australia) Destanee Aiava / (Australia) Alexandra Osborne (first round)

== Draw ==
=== Key ===
- Q = Qualifier
- WC = Wild card
- LL = Lucky loser
- Alt = Alternate
- ITF = ITF entry
- PR = Protected ranking
- SR = Special ranking
- SE = Special exempt
- JE = Junior exempt
- JR = Junior Accelerator Programme entrant
- CO = College Accelerator Programme entrant
- NG = Next Gen Accelerator Program entrant
- w/o = Walkover
- r = Retired
- d = Defaulted

First round
1 | (United States) C Corley (United States) I Corley | w/o
(United States) E Mandlik (United States) A Rogers
(United States) C Harrison (United States) C Rosca | 1 | 4
(United States) M Jones (Indonesia) J Tjen | 6 | 6
4 | (Australia) D Aiava (Australia) A Osborne
(United States) A Akli (United States) V Osuigwe | w/o
(China) X Wang (China) X You | 7 | 6
(United States) H Chang (United States) C McHale | 5 | 3
(United States) S Maltby (United States) M Zampardo | 2 | 6 | [10]
(United States) M Iyengar (Ukraine) A Sahdiieva | 6 | 3 | [5]
(United States) E Ionescu (United States) A Reami | 0 | 2
3 | (Canada) Kayla Cross (United States) A Smith | 6 | 6
(United States) F Crawley (United States) S Daavettila | 6 | 6
(Japan) W Sonobe (India) S Yamalapalli | 4 | 4
(China) Y Ma (Japan) H Sakatsume | 4 | 0
2 | (Netherlands) A Hartono (India) P Thombare | 6 | 6

Quarterfinals
1 | (United States) C Corley (United States) I Corley | 7 | 6
(United States) M Jones (Indonesia) Janice Tjen | 5 | 4
(United States) A Akli (United States) V Osuigwe | w/o
(China) X Wang (China) X You
(United States) S Maltby (United States) M Zampardo | 5 | 6 | [7]
3 | (Canada) K Cross (United States) Alana Smith | 7 | 2 | [10]
(United States) F Crawley (United States) S Daavettila | 1 | 6 | [7]
2 | (Netherlands) A Hartono (India) P Thombare | 6 | 2 | [10]

Semifinals
1 | (United States) C Corley (United States) I Corley | 3 | 6 | [7]
(United States) A Akli (United States) V Osuigwe | 6 | 1 | [10]
3 | (Canada) K Cross (United States) A Smith | 4 | 5
2 | (Netherlands) A Hartono (India) P Thombare | 6 | 7

Final
(United States) A Akli (United States) V Osuigwe | 3 | 3
2 | (Netherlands) A Hartono (India) P Thombare | 6 | 6
