= 2024 The Women's Hospital Classic =

Tennis tournament

- Date: 15–21 July 2024
- Edition: 25th
- Category: ITF Women's World Tennis Tour
- Prize money: $60,000
- Surface: Hard (outdoor)
- Location: Evansville, Indiana, United States

Champions

Singles
- (United States) Sophie Chang

Doubles
- (Spain) Alicia Herrero Liñana / (Argentina) Melany Krywoj
← 2023 ·	The Women's Hospital Classic	· 2025 →

The 2024 The Women's Hospital Classic was a professional tennis tournament played on outdoor hardcourts. It was the twenty-fifth edition of the tournament, which is part of the 2024 ITF Women's World Tennis Tour. It took place in Evansville, Indiana between 15 and 21 July 2024.

== Champions ==
=== Singles ===
- (United States) Sophie Chang def. (United States) Mary Stoiana, 4–6, 7–6^{(7–5)}, 6–3

=== Doubles ===
- (Spain) Alicia Herrero Liñana / (Argentina) Melany Krywoj def. (Japan) Hiroko Kuwata / (India) Sahaja Yamalapalli, 6–2, 6–0

== Singles main draw entrants ==
=== Seeds ===
Country	Player	Rank	Seed
USA	Sachia Vickery	139	1
USA	Elizabeth Mandlik	171	2
CHN	Ma Yexin	203	3
USA	Hanna Chang	214	4
	Iryna Shymanovich	238	5
JPN	Himeno Sakatsume	246	6
USA	Liv Hovde	269	7
USA	Allie Kiick	303	8

- Rankings are as of 1 July 2024.

=== Other entrants ===
The following players received wildcards into the singles main draw:

- (United States) Ashley Kratzer
- (United States) Alexa Noel
- (United States) Annika Penickova
- (United States) Kristina Penickova

The following player received entry into the singles main draw using a special ranking:

- (United Kingdom) Tara Moore

The following players received entry from the qualifying draw:

- (United States) Alexis Blokhina
- (Brazil) Carolina Bohrer Martins
- (United States) Csilla Fodor
- (United States) Anna Frey
- (Spain) Alicia Herrero Liñana
- (United States) Elizabeth Ionescu
- (United States) Karina Miller
- (United States) Alexis Nguyen

The following players received as a lucky loser:

- (United States) Ema Burgić
