= 2022 The Women's Hospital Classic – Doubles =

Doubles
- 2022 The Women's Hospital Classic

Final
- Champions: (United States) Kolie Allen (United States) Ava Markham
- Runners-up: (United States) Kylie Collins (United States) Ashlyn Krueger
- Score: 3–6, 6–1, [10–3]

Events
Singles	Doubles
← 2021 ·	The Women's Hospital Classic	· 2023 →

Kylie Collins and Robin Montgomery were the defending champions but Montgomery chose not to participate.

Collins partnered alongside Ashlyn Krueger, but lost in the final to Kolie Allen and Ava Markham, 6–3, 1–6, [3–10].

== Seeds ==
1. (United States) Emina Bektas / (United States) Catherine Harrison (semifinals, withdrew)
2. (United States) Elizabeth Mandlik / (Mexico) Marcela Zacarías (quarterfinals)
3. (United States) Anna Rogers / (United States) Christina Rosca (quarterfinals)
4. (United States) Alycia Parks / (United States) Sachia Vickery (quarterfinals)

== Draw ==
=== Key ===
- Q = Qualifier
- WC = Wild card
- LL = Lucky loser
- Alt = Alternate
- SE = Special exempt
- PR = Protected ranking
- ITF = ITF entry
- JE = Junior exempt
- w/o = Walkover
- r = Retired
- d = Defaulted
- SR = Special ranking

=== Draw ===
First round
1	(United States) E Bektas (United States) C Harrison	6	6^{2}	[10]
(United States) R Brantmeier (United States) S Daavettila	2	7^{7}	[8]
(India) R Bhatia (Japan) H Kuwata	6	5	[8]
WC	(United States) C Corley (United States) P Corley	3	7	[10]
3	(United States) A Rogers (United States) C Rosca	6	1	[12]
(India) S Balu; M Kononova	4	6	[10]
(United States) K Collins (United States) A Krueger	6	6
(Bulgaria) E Tchakarova (Bulgaria) V Tchakarova	1	1
(Chinese Taipei) C-y Hsu (China) Y Ma	6	5	[10]
(United States) A Zamarripa (United States) M Zamarripa	4	7	[5]
(United States) C Ansari (United States) A Reami	4	2
4	(United States) A Parks (United States) S Vickery	6	6
WC	(United States) K Allen (United States) A Markham	6	6
(United States) V Hu (United States) G Price	3	4
WC	(United States) S Hamner (United States) M Schaefbauer	7^{7}	0	[8]
2	(United States) E Mandlik (Mexico) M Zacarías	6^{3}	6	[10]

Quarterfinals
1	(United States) E Bektas (United States) C Harrison	6	3	[10]
WC	(United States) C Corley (United States) P Corley	0	6	[2]
3	(United States) A Rogers (United States) C Rosca	4	2
(United States) K Collins (United States) A Krueger	6	6
(Chinese Taipei) C-y Hsu (China) Y Ma	3	6	[10]
4	(United States) A Parks (United States) S Vickery	6	2	[7]
WC	(United States) K Allen (United States) A Markham	2	7^{7}	[10]
2	(United States) E Mandlik (Mexico) M Zacarías	6	6^{5}	[5]

Semifinals
1	(United States) E Bektas (United States) C Harrison
(United States) K Collins (United States) A Krueger	w/o
(Chinese Taipei) C-y Hsu (China) Y Ma	4	4
WC	(United States) K Allen (United States) A Markham	6	6

Final
(United States) K Collins (United States) A Krueger	6	1	[3]
WC	(United States) K Allen (United States) A Markham	3	6	[10]
