= 2022 The Women's Hospital Classic =

Tennis tournament

- Date: 18–24 July 2022
- Edition: 23rd
- Category: ITF Women's World Tennis Tour
- Prize money: $60,000
- Surface: Hard / Outdoor
- Location: Evansville, Indiana, United States

Champions

Singles
- (United States) Ashlyn Krueger

Doubles
- (United States) Kolie Allen / (United States) Ava Markham
← 2021 ·	The Women's Hospital Classic	· 2023 →

The 2022 The Women's Hospital Classic was a professional tennis tournament played on outdoor hard courts. It was the twenty-third edition of the tournament which was part of the 2022 ITF Women's World Tennis Tour. It took place in Evansville, Indiana, United States between 18 and 24 July 2022.

== Champions ==
=== Singles ===
- (United States) Ashlyn Krueger def. (United States) Sachia Vickery, 6–3, 7–5

=== Doubles ===
- (United States) Kolie Allen / (United States) Ava Markham def. (United States) Kylie Collins / (United States) Ashlyn Krueger 3–6, 6–1, [10–3]

== Singles main draw entrants ==
=== Seeds ===
Country	Player	Rank^{1}	Seed
USA	Alycia Parks	137	1
USA	Robin Anderson	158	2
USA	Caroline Dolehide	167	3
CAN	Carol Zhao	199	4
USA	Sachia Vickery	212	5
USA	Emina Bektas	222	6
USA	Kayla Day	238	7
MEX	Marcela Zacarías	243	8

- ^{1} Rankings are as of 11 July 2022.

=== Other entrants ===
The following players received wildcards into the singles main draw:

- (United States) Kolie Allen
- (United States) Eryn Cayetano
- (United States) Hina Inoue
- (United States) Peyton Stearns

The following players received entry into the singles main draw using a protected ranking:

- (Colombia) Emiliana Arango

The following players received entry from the qualifying draw:

- (United States) Reese Brantmeier
- (United States) Victoria Duval
- (Japan) Hiroko Kuwata
- (China) Ma Yexin
- (United States) Maegan Manasse
- (United States) Ava Markham
- (United States) Christina Rosca
- (United States) Chanelle Van Nguyen
