= 2022 The Women's Hospital Classic – Singles =

Singles
- 2022 The Women's Hospital Classic

Final
- Champion: (United States) Ashlyn Krueger
- Runner-up: (United States) Sachia Vickery
- Score: 6–3, 7–5

Events
Singles	Doubles
← 2021 ·	The Women's Hospital Classic	· 2023 →

Rebecca Marino was the defending champion but chose not to participate.

Ashlyn Krueger won the title, defeating Sachia Vickery in the final, 6–3, 7–5.

== Seeds ==
1. (United States) Alycia Parks (first round)
2. (United States) Robin Anderson (first round)
3. (United States) Caroline Dolehide (first round)
4. (Canada) Carol Zhao (quarterfinals)
5. (United States) Sachia Vickery (final)
6. (United States) Emina Bektas (first round)
7. (United States) Kayla Day (second round, withdrew)
8. (Mexico) Marcela Zacarías (second round)

== Draw ==
=== Key ===
- Q = Qualifier
- WC = Wild card
- LL = Lucky loser
- Alt = Alternate
- SE = Special exempt
- PR = Protected ranking
- ITF = ITF entry
- JE = Junior exempt
- w/o = Walkover
- r = Retired
- d = Defaulted
- SR = Special ranking

=== Finals ===
Semifinals
(United States) Catherine Harrison	0	6^{6}
(United States) Ashlyn Krueger	6	7^{8}
(United States) Elizabeth Mandlik	6^{5}	5
5	(United States) Sachia Vickery	7^{7}	7

Final
(United States) Ashlyn Krueger	6	7
5	(United States) Sachia Vickery	3	5

=== Top half ===
First round
1	(United States) A Parks	2	0
(Canada) K Sebov	6	6
(United States) M Mateas	5	6	2
(United States) C McHale	7	4	6
(United States) C Harrison	7^{11}	7
WC	(United States) P Stearns	6^{9}	5
Q	(United States) M Manasse	6	5	7
6	(United States) E Bektas	3	7	5
3	(United States) C Dolehide	4	4
(United States) A Krueger	6	6
WC	(United States) H Inoue	6	5	1
(United States) A Glatch	4	7	6
WC	(United States) E Cayetano	6	1	3
Q	(United States) V Duval	3	6	6
Q	(China) Y Ma	6	3	0
8	(Mexico) M Zacarías	4	6	6

Second round
(Canada) K Sebov	2	6	6
(United States) C McHale	6	3	2
(United States) C Harrison	6	7
Q	(United States) M Manasse	3	5
(United States) A Krueger	6	7^{7}
(United States) A Glatch	2	6^{5}
Q	(United States) V Duval	6	7
8	(Mexico) M Zacarías	4	5

Quarterfinals
(Canada) K Sebov	3	2
(United States) C Harrison	6	6
(United States) A Krueger	7^{9}	6
Q	(United States) V Duval	6^{7}	4

Semifinals
(United States) C Harrison	0	6^{6}
(United States) A Krueger	6	7^{8}

=== Bottom half ===
First round
7	(United States) K Day	6	7^{7}
(United States) E Douglas	2	6^{4}
(United States) E Mandlik	6	4	6
Q	(United States) R Brantmeier	2	6	3
PR	(Colombia) E Arango	6	1	6
Q	(United States) C Rosca	4	6	4
Q	(United States) A Markham	4	2
4	(Canada) C Zhao	6	6
5	(United States) S Vickery	6	6
Q	(Japan) H Kuwata	2	0
WC	(United States) K Allen	3	1
(United States) A Kiick	6	6
(United States) H Chang	6	7^{7}
Q	(United States) C Van Nguyen	1	6^{5}
(United States) K Scott	6	5	6
2	(United States) R Anderson	1	7	4

Second round
7	(United States) K Day
(United States) E Mandlik	w/o
PR	(Colombia) E Arango	4	4
4	(Canada) C Zhao	6	6
5	(United States) S Vickery	7	6
(United States) A Kiick	5	3
(United States) H Chang	0	1
(United States) K Scott	6	6

Quarterfinals
(United States) E Mandlik	7	6
4	(Canada) C Zhao	5	3
5	(United States) S Vickery	6	6
(United States) K Scott	4	4

Semifinals
(United States) E Mandlik	6^{5}	5
5	(United States) S Vickery	7^{7}	7
