= 2023 The Women's Hospital Classic =

Tennis tournament

- Date: 17–23 July 2023
- Edition: 24th
- Category: ITF Women's World Tennis Tour
- Prize money: $60,000
- Surface: Hard / Outdoor
- Location: Evansville, Indiana, United States

Champions

Singles
- (India) Karman Kaur Thandi

Doubles
- Maria Kononova / Veronika Miroshnichenko
← 2022 ·	The Women's Hospital Classic	· 2024 →

The 2023 The Women's Hospital Classic was a professional tennis tournament played on outdoor hard courts. It was the twenty fourth edition of the tournament which was part of the 2023 ITF Women's World Tennis Tour. It took place in Evansville, Indiana, United States between 17 and 23 July 2023.

== Champions ==
=== Singles ===
- (India) Karman Thandi def. (Ukraine) Yulia Starodubtseva, 7–5, 4–6, 6–1.

=== Doubles ===
- Maria Kononova / Veronika Miroshnichenko def. (United States) McCartney Kessler / (Ukraine) Yulia Starodubtseva, 6–3, 2–6, [10–8].

== Singles main draw entrants ==
=== Seeds ===
Country	Player	Rank	Seed
USA	Madison Brengle	114	1
USA	Sachia Vickery	163	2
IND	Karman Thandi	233	3
UKR	Yulia Starodubtseva	298	4
USA	Robin Anderson	299	5
USA	Sophie Chang	313	6
USA	Hanna Chang	321	7
USA	Ashley Lahey	326	8

- Rankings are as of 10 July 2023.

=== Other entrants ===
The following players received wildcards into the singles main draw:

- (United States) Samantha Crawford
- (United States) Fiona Crawley
- (United States) Allie Kiick
- (United States) Ellie Myers

The following players received entry from the qualifying draw:

- (United States) Chloe Beck
- (United States) McCartney Kessler
- (United States) Varvara Lepchenko
- (United States) Kylie McKenzie
- (Mexico) María Fernanda Navarro Oliva
- (United States) Victoria Osuigwe
- (United States) Christina Rosca
- (United States) Maribella Zamarripa
