= 2024 The Women's Hospital Classic – Singles =

Singles
- 2024 The Women's Hospital Classic

Final
- Champion: (United States) Sophie Chang
- Runner-up: (United States) Mary Stoiana
- Score: 4–6, 7–6^{(7–5)}, 6–3

Events
| Singles | Doubles |
| ← 2023 · | The Women's Hospital Classic | · 2025 → |

Karman Thandi was the defending champion but chose not to participate.

Sophie Chang won the title, defeating Mary Stoiana in the final, 4–6, 7–6^{(7–5)}, 6–3.

== Seeds ==
1. (United States) Sachia Vickery (quarterfinals, retired)
2. (United States) Elizabeth Mandlik (second round)
3. (China) Ma Yexin (first round)
4. (United States) Hanna Chang (quarterfinals)
5. Iryna Shymanovich (semifinals)
6. (Japan) Himeno Sakatsume (quarterfinals)
7. (United States) Liv Hovde (second round)
8. (United States) Allie Kiick (first round)

== Draw ==
=== Key ===
- Q = Qualifier
- WC = Wild card
- LL = Lucky loser
- Alt = Alternate
- SE = Special exempt
- PR = Protected ranking
- ITF = ITF entry
- JE = Junior exempt
- w/o = Walkover
- r = Retired
- d = Defaulted
- SR = Special ranking

=== Finals ===
Semifinals
(United States) Mary Stoiana | 6 | 6^{5} | 7
(China) Tian Fangran | 3 | 7^{7} | 5
(United States) Sophie Chang | 1 | 6 | 6
5 | Iryna Shymanovich | 6 | 3 | 3

Final
(United States) Mary Stoiana | 6 | 6^{5} | 3
(United States) Sophie Chang | 4 | 7^{7} | 6

=== Top half ===
First round
1 | (United States) S Vickery | 6 | 6
Q | (United States) C Fodor | 3 | 4
(India) SR Bhamidipaty | 6^{3} | 4
SR | (United Kingdom) T Moore | 7^{7} | 6
(United States) M Stoiana | 6 | 6
Q | (Brazil) C Bohrer Martins | 0 | 1
(United States) S Daavettila | 4 | 6 | 6
8 | (United States) A Kiick | 6 | 2 | 2
4 | (United States) H Chang | 6 | 6
Q | (Spain) A Herrero Liñana | 2 | 2
(Japan) H Kuwata | 6 | 6
Q | (United States) A Nguyen | 2 | 2
(United States) F Crawley | 2 | 0
(China) F Tian | 6 | 6
WC | (United States) A Noel | 4 | 2
7 | (United States) L Hovde | 6 | 6

Second round
1 | (United States) S Vickery | 6 | 6
SR | (United Kingdom) T Moore | 3 | 3
(United States) M Stoiana | 6^{5} | 6 | 7
(United States) S Daavettila | 7^{7} | 2 | 5
4 | (United States) H Chang | 2 | 6 | 6
(Japan) H Kuwata | 6 | 1 | 2
(China) F Tian | 6 | 6
7 | (United States) L Hovde | 3 | 2

Quarterfinals
1 | (United States) S Vickery | 1 | 6 | 4^{r}
(United States) M Stoiana | 6 | 0 | 5
4 | (United States) H Chang | 3 | 0
(China) F Tian | 6 | 6

Semifinals
(United States) M Stoiana | 6 | 6^{5} | 7
(China) F Tian | 3 | 7^{7} | 5

=== Bottom half ===
First round
6 | (Japan) H Sakatsume | 3 | 6 | 6
Q | (United States) E Ionescu | 6 | 2 | 1
WC | (United States) A Penickova | 0 | 7 | 6^{4}
WC | (United States) A Kratzer | 6 | 5 | 7^{7}
(United States) S Chang | 6 | 6
LL | (United States) E Burgić | 3 | 4
(Argentina) M Krywoj | 6 | 3 | 6
3 | (China) Y Ma | 2 | 6 | 4
5 | I Shymanovich | 7^{8} | 7
WC | (United States) K Penickova | 6^{6} | 5
Q | (United States) A Blokhina | 0 | 2
(United States) C Ngounoue | 6 | 6
(India) S Yamalapalli | 1 | 6 | 6
Q | (United States) A Frey | 6 | 2 | 2
Q | (United States) K Miller | 5 | 3
2 | (United States) E Mandlik | 7 | 6

Second round
6 | (Japan) H Sakatsume | 6 | 6
WC | (United States) A Kratzer | 3 | 4
(United States) S Chang | 6 | 6
(Argentina) M Krywoj | 0 | 1
5 | I Shymanovich | 7 | 6
(United States) C Ngounoue | 5 | 4
(India) S Yamalapalli | 6 | 7^{7}
2 | (United States) E Mandlik | 3 | 6^{5}

Quarterfinals
6 | (Japan) H Sakatsume | 3 | 2
(United States) S Chang | 6 | 6
5 | I Shymanovich | 5 | 6 | 7^{8}
(India) S Yamalapalli | 7 | 2 | 6^{6}

Semifinals
(United States) S Chang | 1 | 6 | 6
5 | I Shymanovich | 6 | 3 | 3
