= 2023 The Women's Hospital Classic – Singles =

Singles
- 2023 The Women's Hospital Classic

Final
- Champion: (India) Karman Thandi
- Runner-up: (Ukraine) Yulia Starodubtseva
- Score: 7–5, 4–6, 6–1

Events
| Singles | Doubles |
| ← 2022 · | The Women's Hospital Classic | · 2024 → |

Karman Thandi won the singles tournament at the 2023 The Women's Hospital Classic after defeating Yulia Starodubtseva 7–5, 4–6, 6–1 in the final.

Ashlyn Krueger was the defending champion but chose not to defend her title.

== Seeds ==
1. (United States) Madison Brengle (semifinals)
2. (United States) Sachia Vickery (second round)
3. (India) Karman Thandi (champion)
4. (Ukraine) Yuliia Starodubtseva (final)
5. (United States) Robin Anderson (first round)
6. (United States) Sophie Chang (first round)
7. (United States) Hanna Chang (first round)
8. (United States) Ashley Lahey (quarterfinals)

== Draw ==
=== Key ===
- Q = Qualifier
- WC = Wild card
- LL = Lucky loser
- Alt = Alternate
- ITF = ITF entry
- PR = Protected ranking
- SR = Special ranking
- SE = Special exempt
- JE = Junior exempt
- JR = Junior Accelerator Programme entrant
- CO = College Accelerator Programme entrant
- NG = Next Gen Accelerator Program entrant
- w/o = Walkover
- r = Retired
- d = Defaulted

=== Finals ===
Semifinals
1 | (United States) Madison Brengle | 5 | 0
4 | (Ukraine) Yuliia Starodubtseva | 7 | 6
3 | (India) Karman Thandi | 6 | 7
Q | (United States) McCartney Kessler | 4 | 5

Final
4 | (Ukraine) Yuliia Starodubtseva | 5 | 6 | 1
3 | (India) Karman Thandi | 7 | 4 | 6

=== Top Half ===
First round
1 | (United States) M Brengle | 3 | 5
(United States) G Min | 6 | 1^{r}
(Serbia) K Kozarov | 4 | 2
Q | (United States) V Lepchenko | 6 | 6
(United States) H Inoue | 3 | 3
(Bosnia and Herzegovina) N Berberović | 6 | 6
WC | (United States) F Crawley | 6 | 6
5 | (United States) R Anderson | 4 | 1
4 | (Ukraine) Y Starodubtseva | 3 | 6 | 6
Q | (United States) C Beck | 6 | 2 | 0
(United States) W Osuigwe | 2 | 6 | 6
Q | (United States) V Osuigwe | 6 | 3 | 3
(India) S Yamalapalli | 6 | 7^{7}
Q | (United States) C Rosca | 1 | 6^{3}
V Miroshnichenko | 6 | 6^{5} | 6
6 | (United States) S Chang | 3 | 7^{7} | 4

Second round
1 | (United States) M Brengle | 7 | 4 | 6
Q | (United States) V Lepchenko | 5 | 6 | 3
(Bosnia and Herzegovina) N Berberović | 6 | 3 | 6
WC | (United States) F Crawley | 1 | 6 | 2
4 | (Ukraine) Y Starodubtseva | 6 | 6
(United States) W Osuigwe | 0 | 0
(India) S Yamalapalli | 1 | 2
V Miroshnichenko | 6 | 6

Quarterfinals
1 | (United States) M Brengle | 6 | 6
(Bosnia and Herzegovina) N Berberović | 3 | 1
4 | (Ukraine) Y Starodubtseva | 7 | 6
V Miroshnichenko | 5 | 0

Semifinals
1 | (United States) M Brengle | 5 | 0
4 | (Ukraine) Y Starodubtseva | 7 | 6

=== Bottom Half ===
First round
7 | (United States) H Chang | 3 | 3
(Germany) S Lisicki | 6 | 6
(United States) M Sieg | 1 | 1
WC | (United States) A Kiick | 6 | 6
WC | (United States) E Myers | 0 | 3
Q | (United States) M Zamarripa | 6 | 6
Q | (Mexico) MF Navarro Oliva | 3 | 2
3 | (India) K Thandi | 6 | 6
8 | (United States) A Lahey | 3 | 7 | 7
(China) Y Ma | 6 | 5 | 5
Q | (United States) K McKenzie | 1 | 7 | 6
(United States) R Kingsley | 6 | 5 | 3
WC | (United States) S Crawford | 4 | 3
Q | (United States) M Kessler | 6 | 6
(United States) D Hewitt | 2 | 2
2 | (United States) S Vickery | 6 | 6

Second round
(Germany) S Lisicki | 1 | 5
WC | (United States) A Kiick | 6 | 7
Q | (United States) M Zamarripa | 2 | 4
3 | (India) K Thandi | 6 | 6
8 | (United States) A Lahey | 3 | 6 | 6
Q | (United States) K McKenzie | 6 | 0 | 3
Q | (United States) M Kessler | 1 | 7^{7} | 6
2 | (United States) S Vickery | 6 | 6^{5} | 0

Quarterfinals
WC | (United States) A Kiick | 3 | 3
3 | (India) K Thandi | 6 | 6
8 | (United States) A Lahey | 1 | 1
Q | (United States) M Kessler | 6 | 6

Semifinals
3 | (India) K Thandi | 6 | 7
Q | (United States) M Kessler | 4 | 5
