= 2025 The Women's Hospital Classic – Singles =

Singles
- 2025 The Women's Hospital Classic

Final
- Champion: (United States) Caty McNally
- Runner-up: (Czech Republic) Darja Vidmanova
- Score: 7-5, 6-4

Events
Singles	Doubles
← 2024 ·	The Women's Hospital Classic	· 2026 →

Sophie Chang was the defending champion but chose not to participate.

Caty McNally won the title, defeating Darja Vidmanova in the final, 7–5, 6–4.

== Seeds ==
1. (China) Yue Yuan (quarterfinals)
2. (Australia) Talia Gibson (quarterfinals)
3. (United States) Whitney Osuigwe (first round, retired)
4. (China) Xiyu Wang (semifinals)
5. (United States) Kayla Day (second round)
6. (Netherlands) Arianne Hartono (semifinals)
7. (United States) Caty McNally (champion)
8. (Indonesia) Janice Tjen (quarterfinals)

== Draw ==
Key

- Q = Qualifier
- WC = Wild card
- LL = Lucky loser
- Alt = Alternate
- ITF = ITF entry
- PR = Protected ranking
- SR = Special ranking
- SE = Special exempt
- JE = Junior exempt
- JR = Junior Accelerator Programme entrant
- CO = College Accelerator Programme entrant
- NG = Next Gen Accelerator Program entrant
- w/o = Walkover
- r = Retired
- d = Defaulted

=== Finals ===
Semifinals
3	(United States) Caty McNally	6	6
5	(China) Xiyu Wang	3	1
6	(Netherlands) Arianne Hartono	3	4
7	(Czech Republic) Darja Vidmanova	6	6

Final
3	(United States) Caty McNally	7	6
7	(Czech Republic) Darja Vidmanova	5	4

=== Top half ===
First round
1	(China) Y Yuan	6	6
Q	(Ukraine) K Vozniak	1	1
Q	(United States) E Ionescu	1	2
WC	(United States) A Akli	6	6
(United States) A Rogers	3	2
Q	(Canada) C Brace	6	6
(United States) M Stoiana	4	6	2
5	(China) X Wang	6	1	6
3	(United States) Caty McNally	6	6
Q	(China) X You	3	3
(Canada) Kayla Cross	6	6
Q	(China) Y Ma	4	1
WC	(United States) S Daavettila	5	3
(Canada) C Zhao	7	6
Q	(United States) K Liu	6^{7}	1
8	(Indonesia) J Tjen	7^{9}	6

Second round
1	(China) Y Yuan	6	6
WC	(United States) A Akli	2	2
Q	(Canada) C Brace	0	5
5	(China) X Wang	6	7
3	(United States) Caty McNally	6	6
(Canada) Kayla Cross	3	2
(Canada) C Zhao	4	2
8	(Indonesia) J Tjen	6	6

Quarterfinals
1	(China) Y Yuan	6^{11}	5
5	(China) X Wang	7	7
3	(United States) Caty McNally	6	7^{7}
8	(Indonesia) J Tjen	2	6^{3}

Semifinals
5	(China) X Wang	3	1
3	(United States) Caty McNally	6	6

=== Bottom half ===
First round
8	(Netherlands) A Hartono	7^{7}	6
Q	(United States) J Daniel	6^{5}	2
SE	(United States) F Crawley	6^{4}	6	6
WC	(United States) M Elkstrand	7^{7}	3	4
(Japan) M Yamaguchi	2	2
(United States) H Chang	6	6
(Japan) H Sakatsume	6	4	5
4	(United States) W Osuigwe	2	6	2^{r}
7	(Czech Republic) D Vidmanova	6	6
WC	(United States) E Kalieva	4	3
Q	(United States) V Osuigwe	6	4	6^{5}
SR	(United States) M Jones	0	7	7^{7}
(United States) E Mandlik	7	5	2
SR	(United States) K Day	5	6	6
Q	(United States) A Reami	4	6	1
2	(Australia) T Gibson	6	4	6

Second round
8	(Netherlands) A Hartono	6	6
SE	(United States) F Crawley	2	0
(United States) H Chang	5	7^{8}	5
(Japan) H Sakatsume	7	6^{6}	7
7	(Czech Republic) D Vidmanova	6	6
SR	(United States) M Jones	2	2
(United States) K Day	2	2
2	(Australia) T Gibson	6	6

Quarterfinals
8	(Netherlands) A Hartono	7^{7}	6
(Japan) H Sakatsume	6^{5}	1
7	(Czech Republic) D Vidmanova	6	6
(Australia) T Gibson	4	1

Semifinals
8	(Netherlands) A Hartono	3	4
7	(Czech Republic) D Vidmanova	6	6
