= 2024 The Women's Hospital Classic – Doubles =

Doubles
- 2024 The Women's Hospital Classic

Final
- Champions: (Spain) Alicia Herrero Liñana (Argentina) Melany Krywoj
- Runners-up: (Japan) Hiroko Kuwata (India) Sahaja Yamalapalli
- Score: 6–2, 6–0

Events
| Singles | Doubles |
| ← 2023 · | The Women's Hospital Classic | · 2025 → |

Maria Kononova and Veronika Miroshnichenko were the defending champions, but Miroshnichenko chose not to participate. Kononova partners alongside Sara Daavettila, but lost in the first round to Hiroko Kuwata and Sahaja Yamalapalli.

Alicia Herrero Liñana and Melany Krywoj won the title, defeating Kuwata and Yamalapalli in the final, 6–2, 6–0.

== Seeds ==
1. (United States) Sophie Chang / (United States) Catherine Harrison (semifinals}
2. (Spain) Alicia Herrero Liñana / (Argentina) Melany Krywoj (champions)
3. (India) Shrivalli Rashmikaa Bhamidipaty / (China) Tian Fangran (first round)
4. (United States) Sara Daavettila / Maria Kononova (first round)

== Draw ==
=== Key ===
- Q = Qualifier
- WC = Wild card
- LL = Lucky loser
- Alt = Alternate
- SE = Special exempt
- PR = Protected ranking
- ITF = ITF entry
- JE = Junior exempt
- w/o = Walkover
- r = Retired
- d = Defaulted
- SR = Special ranking

First round
1 | (United States) S Chang (United States) C Harrison | 6 | 6
(United States) E Burgić (United States) A Reami | 1 | 2
(Mexico) J Hinojosa Gómez (Chinese Taipei) C-y Hsu | 0 | 1
(Brazil) C Bohrer Martins (United States) V Flores | 6 | 6
4 | (United States) S Daavettila; M Kononova | 4 | 6 | [7]
(Japan) H Kuwata (India) S Yamalapalli | 6 | 4 | [10]
WC | (United States) C Boyer (United States) M Fuduric | w/o
(United States) C Fodor (United Kingdom) B Murgett
(United States) F Crawley (United States) M Stoiana | 4 | 6 | [10]
(United Kingdom) T Moore (United States) S Vickery | 6 | 3 | [5]
(United States) A Frey (United States) E Ionescu | 7^{7} | 6
3 | (India) SR Bhamidipaty (China) F Tian | 6^{4} | 4
WC | (United States) K Fakih (United States) S Maltby | 6 | 3 | [8]
(United States) H Chang (China) Y Ma | 2 | 6 | [10]
WC | (United States) M Heuser (United States) M Schaefbauer | 3 | 4
2 | (Spain) A Herrero Liñana (Argentina) M Krywoj | 6 | 6

Quarterfinals
1 | (United States) S Chang (United States) C Harrison | 7 | 6
(Brazil) C Bohrer Martins (United States) V Flores | 5 | 3
(Japan) H Kuwata (India) S Yamalapalli | w/o
WC | (United States) C Boyer (United States) M Fuduric
(United States) F Crawley (United States) M Stoiana
(United States) A Frey (United States) E Ionescu | w/o
(United States) H Chang (China) Y Ma | 5 | 6^{3}
2 | (Spain) A Herrero Liñana (Argentina) M Krywoj | 7 | 7^{7}

Semifinals
1 | (United States) S Chang (United States) C Harrison | 4 | 3
(Japan) H Kuwata (India) S Yamalapalli | 6 | 6
(United States) A Frey (United States) E Ionescu | 1 | 0
2 | (Spain) A Herrero Liñana (Argentina) M Krywoj | 6 | 6

Final
(Japan) H Kuwata (India) S Yamalapalli | 2 | 0
2 | (Spain) A Herrero Liñana (Argentina) M Krywoj | 6 | 6
