= Kylie Collins =

American tennis player (born 2002)

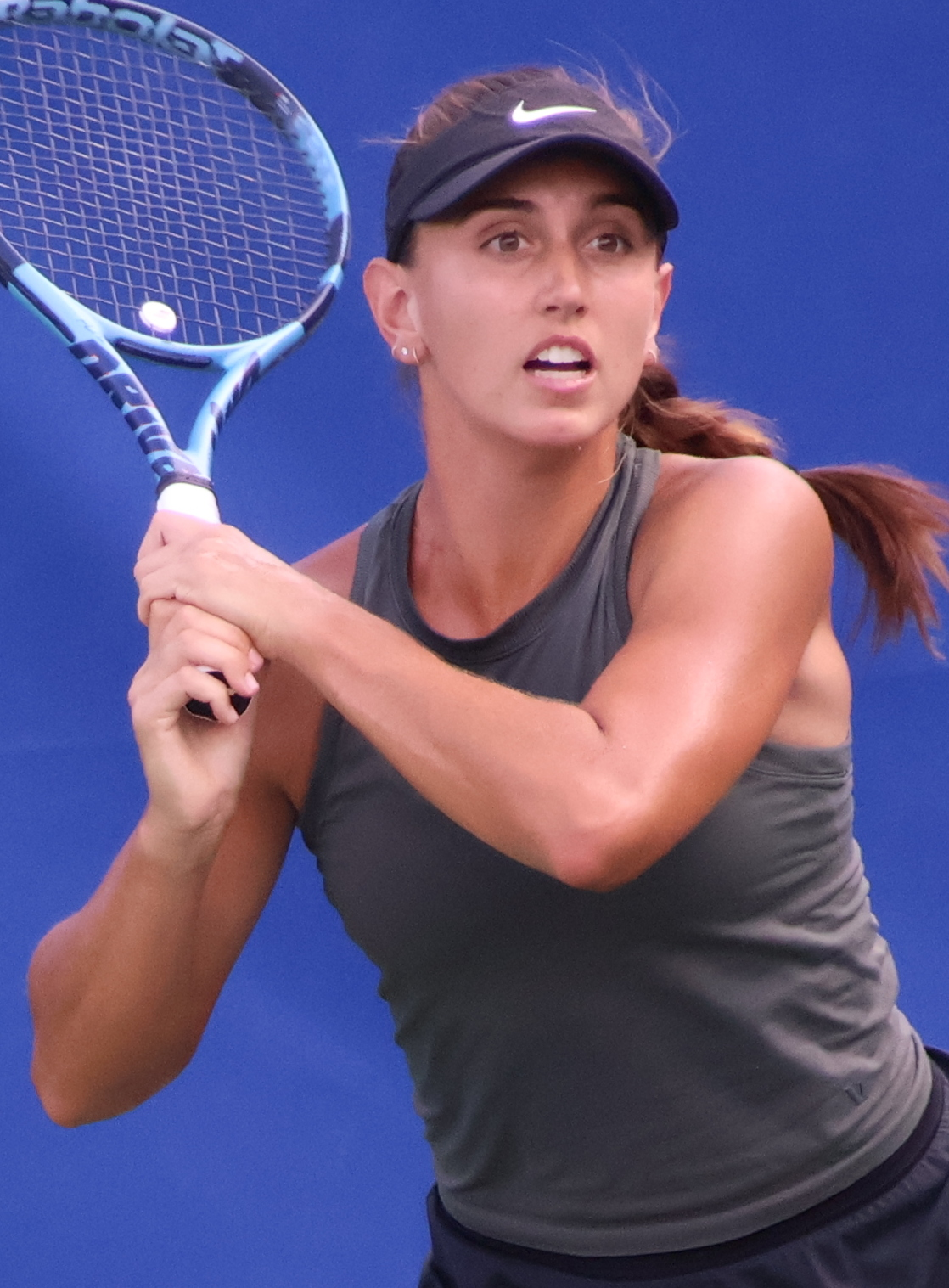
- Collins in 2026
- Country (sports): United States
- Born: December 4, 2002 (age 23)
- Height: 5 ft 7 in (170 cm)
- Plays: Right (two-handed backhand)
- College: Texas (2020–2022); LSU (2022–2024); Oklahoma State (2024–2025)
- Prize money: $68,008

Singles
- Career record: 109–89
- Highest ranking: No. 320 (October 26, 2026)
- Current ranking: No. 320 (October 26, 2026)

Grand Slam singles results
- Australian Open Junior: 1R (2019)

Doubles
- Career record: 93–50
- Career titles: 8 ITF
- Highest ranking: No. 178 (September 21, 2026)
- Current ranking: No. 178 (September 21, 2026)

Grand Slam doubles results
- Australian Open Junior: 1R (2019)
- Last updated on: September 26, 2026.

Kylie Collins (born December 4, 2002) is an American professional tennis player.

She has a career-high singles ranking by the WTA of No. 330 and a best doubles ranking of world No. 178, both achieved on September 21, 2026.

Collins has been active on the ITF Women's World Tennis Tour since June 2018. As of September 2026, she has won eight doubles titles on the ITF World Tour.

== Early career ==
Collins attended the University of Texas at Austin from 2020 to 2022. During her freshman year, she was an Intercollegiate Tennis Association (ITA) All-American in doubles was runner-up in the NCAA Doubles Championship. During her sophomore year, she was an ITA All-American in singles, and reached the Round of 16 of the NCAA Singles Championship. Both years at Texas, the program won the NCAA team championship.

At Louisiana State University during the 2022–2023 season, Collins was an ITA All-American in doubles; appeared in the NCAA Singles and Doubles Championships; and was runner-up in the ITA All-American Championship singles final. She missed the next season due to injury before transferring to Oklahoma State University.

== Professional ==
Collins has reached 15 ITF doubles finals, winning eight. Her most notable victory came on July 18, 2026, partnering Olivia Lincer to defeat Mia Kupres and Alexandra Vagramov to win the doubles final at the W75 Championnats de Granby in Quebec, Canada.

On July 12, 2026, Collins reached the doubles final of the WTA 125 Hall of Fame Open in Newport, Rhode Island.

== WTA 125 finals ==
=== Doubles: 1 (runner-up) ===
Result	W–L	Date	Tournament	Surface	Partner	Opponents	Score
Loss	0–1	Jul 2026	Hall of Fame Open, United States	Grass	(United States) Savannah Broadus	(United States) Katie Volynets; Iryna Shymanovich	2–6, 6–7^{(6)}

== ITF Circuit finals ==
=== Singles: 1 (runner-up) ===
Legend W15 tournaments	Finals by surface Hard (0–1)

Result	W–L	Date	Tournament	Tier	Surface	Opponent	Score
Loss	0–1	Jun 2025	ITF Los Angeles, United States	W15	Hard	Veronika Miroshnichenko	2–6, 3–6

=== Doubles: 20 (9 titles, 11 runner-ups) ===
Legend W100 tournaments W60/75 tournaments W50 tournaments W25/35 tournaments W15 tournaments	Finals by surface Hard (6–7) Clay (3–4)

Result	W–L	Date	Tournament	Tier	Surface	Partner	Opponents	Score
Loss	0–1	Oct 2017	ITF Hilton Head, United States	W15	Clay	(United States) Meg Kowalski	(United Kingdom) Emily Appleton (United States) Caty McNally	5–7, 3–6
Loss	0–2	May 2019	ITF Williamsburg, United States	W15	Clay	(United States) Elaine Chervinsky	(United States) Savannah Broadus (United States) Vanessa Ong	3–6, 1–6
Loss	0–3	Jun 2019	ITF Wesley Chapel, United States	W15	Clay	(United States) Sofia Sewing	(United States) Allura Zamarripa (United States) Maribella Zamarripa	6–3, 4–6, [11–13]
Win	1–3	Jul 2021	Evansville Classic, United States	W25	Hard	(United States) Robin Montgomery	(United States) Lauren Proctor (United States) Anna Ulyashchenko	5–7, 6–3, [10–2]
Win	2–3	Nov 2021	ITF Daytona Beach, United States	W25	Clay	(Australia) Elysia Bolton	(Australia) Alexandra Osborne (United States) Alycia Parks	6–4, 6–7^{(4)}, [10–5]
Win	3–3	Jun 2022	Palmetto Pro Open, United States	W25	Hard	(United States) Peyton Stearns	(United States) Allura Zamarripa (United States) Maribella Zamarripa	6–3, 5–7, [10–7]
Loss	3–4	Jul 2022	Evansville Classic, United States	W60	Hard	(United States) Ashlyn Krueger	(United States) Kolie Allen (United States) Ava Markham	6–3, 1–6, [3–10]
Win	4–4	Jul 2025	ITF Los Angeles, United States	W15	Hard	(Ukraine) Anita Sahdiieva	(United States) Olivia Center (United States) Sophia Webster	6–3, 6–1
Win	5–4	Jul 2025	ITF San Diego, United States	W15	Hard	(Ukraine) Anita Sahdiieva	(Mexico) Midori Castillo Meza (United States) Brandelyn Fulgenzi	6–4, 6–0
Loss	5–5	Jul 2025	ITF Florence, United States	W35	Hard	(Venezuela) Sofia Elena Cabezas Dominguez	(United States) Haley Giavara (Japan) Hiroko Kuwata	0–6, 4–6
Loss	5–6	Apr 2026	ITF Jackson, United States	W35	Clay	(United States) Carson Tanguilig	(United States) Kailey Evans (Japan) Mio Mushika	6–7^{(5)}, 6–2, [10–12]
Win	6–6	Apr 2026	ITF Bonita Springs, United States	W15	Clay	(United States) Carson Tanguilig	(United States) Carlota Moreno (United States) Nadia Elle Valdez	6–2, 6–3
Win	7–6	May 2026	ITF Bethany Beach, United States	W35	Clay	(United States) Savannah Broadus	(United States) Eryn Cayetano (United States) Haley Giavara	6–0, 7–5
Loss	7–7	Jun 2026	Georgia's Rome Open, United States	W35	Hard	(United States) Savannah Broadus	(United States) Jaeda Daniel (Australia) Lily Fairclough	5–7, 4–6
Win	8–7	Jul 2026	Championnats de Granby, Canada	W75	Hard	(United States) Olivia Lincer	(Canada) Mia Kupres (Canada) Alexandra Vagramov	6–2, 6–2
Loss	8–8	Jul 2026	Lexington Open, United States	W75	Hard	(United States) Savannah Broadus	(United States) Ayana Akli (United States) Fiona Crawley	6–2, 6–7^{(3)}, [10–12]
Loss	8–9	Aug 2026	Landisville Tennis Challenge, United States	W100	Hard	(United States) Savannah Broadus	(Chinese Taipei) Cho I-hsuan (Chinese Taipei) Cho Yi-tsen	2–6, 4–6
Loss	8–10	Sep 2026	The Campus Open, Portugal	W75	Hard	(United States) Carson Tanguilig	(United States) Ayana Akli (United States) Reese Brantmeier	5–7, 4–6
Win	9–10	Oct 2026	ITF Austin, United States	W50	Hard	(United Kingdom) Ella McDonald	(United States) Ashley Lahey (Canada) Alexandra Vagramov	6–0, 6–1
Loss	9–11	Oct 2026	Christus Health Pro Challenge, United States	W100	Hard	(United States) Kristina Penickova	(United States) Savannah Broadus (United States) Allura Zamarripa	6–7^{(5)}, 0–6
