= 2025 The Women's Hospital Classic =

Tennis tournament

- Date: 21-27 July 2025
- Edition: 26th
- Category: ITF Women's World Tennis Tour
- Prize money: $100,000
- Surface: Hard (outdoor)
- Location: Evansville, Indiana, United States

Champions

Singles
- (United States) Caty McNally

Doubles
- (Netherlands) Arianne Hartono / (India) Prarthana Thombare
← 2024 ·	The Women's Hospital Classic	· 2026 →

The 2025 The Women's Hospital Classic was a professional tennis tournament played on outdoor hardcourts. It was the twenty-sixth edition of the tournament, which is part of the 2025 ITF Women's World Tennis Tour. It took place in Evansville, Indiana between 21 and 27 July 2025.

== Champions ==
=== Singles ===
- (United States) Caty McNally def. (Czech Republic) Darja Vidmanova, 7–5, 6–4

=== Doubles ===
- (Netherlands) Arianne Hartono / (India) Prarthana Thombare def. (United States) Ayana Akli / (United States) Victoria Osuigwe, 6–3, 6–3

== Singles main draw entrants ==
=== Seeds ===
Country	Player	Rank	Seed
CHN	Yue Yuan	85	1
AUS	Talia Gibson	126	2
USA	Whitney Osuigwe	158	3
CHN	Xiyu Wang	163	4
USA	Kayla Day	177	5
NED	Arianne Hartono	184	6
USA	Caty McNally	208	7
INA	Janice Tjen	221	8

- Rankings are as of 1 July 2025.

=== Other entrants ===
The following players received wildcards into the singles main draw:

- (United States) Ayana Akli
- (United States) Sara Daavettila
- (United States) Monika Elkstrand
- (United States) Elvina Kalieva

The following players received entry into the singles main draw using a special ranking:

- (United States) Makenna Jones
- (United States) Kayla Day

The following player received entry into the singles main draw as a special exempt:

- (United States) Fiona Crawley

The following players received entry from the qualifying draw:

- (United States) Kallista Liu
- (Canada) Cadence Brace
- (United States) Elizabeth Ionescu
- (Ukraine) Khrystyna Vozniak
- (China) Xiaodi You
- (United States) Victoria Osuigwe
- (United States) Jaeda Daniel
- (United States) Adriana Reami
