= Kolie Allen =

American tennis player

- Country (sports): United States
- Residence: Lombard, Illinois, United States
- Born: 17 March 2000 (age 26)
- Height: 1.80 m (5 ft 11 in)
- Plays: Right (two-handed backhand)
- College: Ohio State University
- Prize money: $28,926

Singles
- Career record: 57–80
- Highest ranking: No. 883 (1 July 2024)
- Current ranking: No. 1,043 (31 August 2026)

Doubles
- Career record: 66–69
- Career titles: 2 ITF
- Highest ranking: No. 439 (24 November 2025)
- Current ranking: No. 471 (31 August 2026)
- Last updated on: 7 September 2026.

Kolie Allen (born 17 March 2000) is an American tennis player.

Allen has a career-high doubles ranking by the WTA of 439, achieved on 24 November 2025. She has won one doubles title on the ITF Women's World Tennis Tour.

Allen won her biggest title to date at the 2022 Evansville Classic, where she partnered Ava Markham to win the doubles title.

== ITF Circuit finals ==
=== Doubles: 7 (2 titles, 5 runner-ups) ===
Legend W60 tournaments W35 tournaments W15 tournaments	Finals by surface Hard (2–2) Clay (0–3)

Result	W–L	Date	Tournament	Tier	Surface	Partner	Opponents	Score
Win	1–0	Jul 2022	Evansville Classic, United States	W60	Hard	(United States) Ava Markham	(United States) Kylie Collins (United States) Ashlyn Krueger	3–6, 6–1, [10–3]
Loss	1–1	May 2023	ITF Huntsville, US	W15	Clay	(United States) Paris Corley	(United States) Rhiann Newborn (United States) Mia Yamakita	5–7, 3–6
Loss	1–2	Aug 2023	ITF Duffel, Belgium	W15	Clay	(Belgium) Ema Kovacevic	Polina Bakhmutkina (Belgium) Chelsea Vanhoutte	5–7, 4–6
Loss	1–3	Nov 2024	ITF Santo Domingo, Dominican Republic	W35	Hard	(Colombia) Yuliana Monroy	(United States) Haley Giavara (Japan) Hiroko Kuwata	7–5, 4–6, [6–10]
Loss	1–4	Oct 2025	ITF Redding, US	W35	Hard	(United States) Rasheeda McAdoo	(Australia) Elysia Bolton (United States) Jaeda Daniel	5–7, 5–7
Win	2–4	Oct 2025	ITF Lincoln, US	W15	Hard (i)	(United States) Megan Heuser	(Israel) Mika Buchnik; Edda Mamedova	6–3, 6–3
Loss	2–5	Feb 2026	ITF Palm Coast, US	W15	Clay	(Mexico) Sabastiani León	(Brazil) Carolina Bohrer Martins (Brazil) Thaísa Grana Pedretti	6–7^{(4)}, 7–6^{(5)}, [4–10]
