= Maria Kononova =

Russian tennis player (born 1997)

- Full name: Maria Evgenievna Kononova
- Country (sports): Russia
- Born: 4 March 1997 (age 29) Ufa, Russia
- Plays: Right (two-handed backhand)
- College: North Texas Mean Green
- Prize money: $54,823

Singles
- Career record: 93–109
- Career titles: 0
- Highest ranking: No. 635 (4 March 2024)
- Current ranking: No. 1,044 (16 November 2026)

Doubles
- Career record: 105–75
- Career titles: 10 ITF
- Highest ranking: No. 158 (10 February 2025)
- Current ranking: No. 780 (16 November 2026)
- Last updated on: 16 November 2026.

Maria Evgenievna Kononova (Russian: Мария Евгеньевна Кононова, born 4 March 1997) is a Russian tennis player.

Kononova has career-high rankings by the WTA of 635 in singles, reached on 4 March 2024, and world No. 158 in doubles, achieved on 10 February 2025.

She played college tennis at the University of North Texas.

Kononova has won ten doubles titles on the ITF Women's Circuit. She won her first $60k tournament in July 2023, at the Evansville Classic, alongside fellow Russian player Veronika Miroshnichenko.

== ITF Circuit finals ==
=== Doubles: 15 (10 titles, 5 runner-ups) ===
Legend W60/75 tournaments W50 tournaments W25/35 tournaments W15 tournaments	Finals by surface Hard (4–4) Clay (6–1)

Result	W–L	Date	Tournament	Tier	Surface	Partner	Opponents	Score
Win	1–0	Mar 2022	ITF Naples, US	W15	Clay	(Latvia) Līga Dekmeijere	(United States) Qavia Lopez (United States) Madison Sieg	6–7^{(7)}, 6–3, [19–17]
Loss	1–1	Sep 2022	ITF Lubbock, US	W15	Hard	(Chinese Taipei) Hsu Chieh-yu	(Serbia) Katarina Kozarov (Russia) Veronika Miroshnichenko	1–6, 6–4, [9–11]
Loss	1–2	Nov 2022	ITF Champaign, US	W15	Hard	(Russia) Maria Kozyreva	(United States) Katherine Duong (United States) Megan Heuser	0–6, 6–7^{(5)}
Win	2–2	Mar 2022	ITF Naples, US	W15	Hard	(Spain) Alicia Herrero Liñana	(Argentina) Melany Krywoj (Slovakia) Vanda Vargová	4–6, 6–3, [10–7]
Win	3–2	Apr 2023	Florida's Sports Coast Open, US	W25	Clay	(Ukraine) Yulia Starodubtseva	(United States) Jada Hart (United States) Rasheeda McAdoo	7–5, 6–3
Win	4–2	Jul 2023	Evansville Classic, US	W60	Hard	(Russia) Veronika Miroshnichenko	(United States) McCartney Kessler (Ukraine) Yulia Starodubtseva	6–3, 2–6, [10–8]
Win	5–2	Feb 2024	ITF Wesley Chapel, US	W35	Clay	(Russia) Maria Kozyreva	(Poland) Weronika Falkowska (Switzerland) Leonie Küng	7–5, 6–1
Win	6–2	Mar 2024	ITF Campinas, Brazil	W15	Clay	(United States) Jaeda Daniel	(Brazil) Júlia Konishi Camargo Silva (Japan) Wakana Sonobe	6–0, 6–7^{(3)}, [10–4]
Win	7–2	Apr 2024	Florianópolis Challenger, Brazil	W75	Clay	(Russia) Maria Kozyreva	(Serbia) Katarina Jokić (Brazil) Rebeca Pereira	6–4, 6–3
Loss	7–3	Apr 2024	Charlottesville Open, US	W75	Clay	(Russia) Maria Kozyreva	(United Kingdom) Emily Appleton (United States) Quinn Gleason	6–7^{(5)}, 1–6
Win	8–3	May 2024	ITF Boca Raton, US	W35	Clay	(United States) Rasheeda McAdoo	(Spain) Alicia Herrero Liñana (Argentina) Melany Krywoj	2–6, 6–4, [10–5]
Win	9–3	Sep 2024	Rancho Santa Fe Open, US	W75	Hard	(Russia) Maria Kozyreva	(United States) Haley Giavara (United States) Rasheeda McAdoo	6–2, 7–6^{(4)}
Loss	9–4	Nov 2024	ITF Boca Raton, US	W50	Hard	(Russia) Maria Kozyreva	(Spain) Alicia Herrero Liñana (United States) Anna Rogers	2–6, 1–6
Win	10–4	Jun 2026	ITF Decatur, US	W35	Hard	(United States) Sara Daavettila	(United States) Thara Gowda (United States) Kaede Usui	6–3, 6–2
Loss	10–5	Nov 2026	ITF Lincoln, US	W15	Hard (i)	(United States) Jenna Dean	(South Africa) Isabella Kruger (Egypt) Merna Refaat	1–6, 5–7
