= Melany Krywoj =

Argentine tennis player (born 1998)

- Full name: Melany Solange Krywoj
- Country (sports): Argentina
- Born: 27 February 1998 (age 28) Lobos, Argentina
- Plays: Right (two-handed backhand)
- College: Baylor
- Prize money: $58,398

Singles
- Career record: 141–112
- Highest ranking: No. 526 (15 January 2024)

Doubles
- Career record: 126–70
- Career titles: 12 ITF
- Highest ranking: No. 166 (11 November 2024)
Medal record
Women's tennis
Representing Venezuela
South American Games
Silver medal – second place	2018 Cochabamba	Mixed doubles

Melany Solange Krywoj (born 27 February 1998) is an Argentine inactive tennis player. She has a career-high doubles ranking of No. 166 by the WTA, achieved on 11 November 2024, and a best singles ranking of world No. 526 reached on 15 January 2024. She has won 12 doubles titles on the ITF Circuit.

She won her first $75k title at the Palmetto Pro Open in the doubles draw, partnering Alicia Herrero Liñana.

She played collegiate tennis for the Baylor Bears in Texas.

== ITF Circuit finals ==
=== Singles: 1 (runner-up) ===
Legend W15 tournaments	Finals by surface Hard (0–1)

Result	Date	Tournament	Tier	Surface	Opponent	Score
Loss	Jun 2019	ITF Cancún, Mexico	W15	Hard	(Romania) Patricia Maria Țig	2–6, 6–4, 3–6

=== Doubles: 24 (12 titles, 12 runner-ups) ===
Legend W75 tournaments W40 tournaments W25/35 tournaments W10/15 tournaments	Finals by surface Hard (7–6) Clay (5–6)

Result	W–L	Date	Tournament	Tier	Surface	Partner	Opponents	Score
Loss	0–1	Oct 2015	ITF Santa Margherita di Pula, Italy	W10	Clay	(United States) Dasha Ivanova	(Hungary) Vanda Lukács (Italy) Camilla Rosatello	3–6, 2–6
Loss	0–2	Dec 2017	ITF Santiago, Chile	W15	Clay	(Argentina) Eugenia Ganga	(United States) Chiara Scholl (Mexico) Marcela Zacarías	6–7^{(2)}, 6–4, [6–10]
Win	1–2	Jun 2019	ITF Cancún, Mexico	W15	Hard	(Argentina) Paula Barañano	(Poland) Daria Kuczer (United Kingdom) Emilie Lindh	6–2, 6–4
Loss	1–3	Jun 2019	ITF Cancún, Mexico	W15	Hard	(Chile) Fernanda Labraña	(Mexico) Fernanda Contreras (Mexico) Jessica Hinojosa Gómez	6–2, 4–6, [7–10]
Win	2–3	Aug 2019	ITF Knokke, Belgium	W15	Clay	(Belgium) Chelsea Vanhoutte	(Russia) Anastasia Pribylova (Russia) Anna Pribylova	6–3, 2–6, [12–10]
Loss	2–4	Oct 2019	ITF Austin, United States	W15	Hard	(Chile) Fernanda Labraña	(Italy) Anna Turati (Italy) Bianca Turati	3–6, 6–1, [4–10]
Win	3–4	Dec 2021	ITF Cancún, Mexico	W15	Hard	(Spain) Alicia Herrero Liñana	(Japan) Minami Akiyama (Japan) Miho Kuramochi	6–4, 6–2
Win	4–4	Jun 2022	ITF Santo Domingo, Dominican Republic	W25	Hard	(Spain) Alicia Herrero Liñana	(Czech Republic) Gabriela Knutson (Slovakia) Katarína Strešnaková	6–2, 6–4
Loss	4–5	Jul 2022	ITF Cancún, Mexico	W15	Hard	(Spain) Alicia Herrero Liñana	(Mexico) Jessica Hinojosa Gómez (Mexico) Victoria Rodríguez	2–6, 5–7
Loss	4–6	Jul 2022	ITF Cancún, Mexico	W15	Hard	(Spain) Alicia Herrero Liñana	(Japan) Hikaru Sato (Canada) Vanessa Wong	2–6, 4–6
Win	5–6	Aug 2022	ITF Cancún, Mexico	W15	Hard	(United States) Paris Corley	(Japan) Mao Mushika (Japan) Mio Mushika	7–6^{(6)}, 6–3
Loss	5–7	Nov 2022	ITF Naples, United States	W15	Hard	(Slovakia) Vanda Vargová	(Spain) Alicia Herrero Liñana (Russia) Maria Kononova	6–4, 3–6, [7–10]
Loss	5–8	Mar 2023	ITF Sopo, Colombia	W25	Clay	(United States) Victoria Hu	(Argentina) Guillermina Naya (Argentina) Julia Riera	5–7, 4–6
Loss	5–9	Jul 2023	ITF Punta Cana, Dominican Republic	W25	Clay	(Spain) Alicia Herrero Liñana	(United States) Victoria Osuigwe (United States) Whitney Osuigwe	1–6, 6–1, [7–10]
Loss	5–10	Nov 2023	ITF Veracruz, Mexico	W40	Hard	(United States) Victoria Hu	(United States) Dalayna Hewitt (Russia) Veronika Miroshnichenko	6–2, 3–6, [8–10]
Win	6–10	Dec 2023	ITF Mogi das Cruzes, Brazil	W25	Clay	(Brazil) Ana Candiotto	(Italy) Nicole Fossa Huergo (Lithuania) Justina Mikulskytė	6–2, 1–6, [10–6]
Loss	6–11	Jan 2024	ITF Buenos Aires, Argentina	W35	Clay	(Bolivia) Noelia Zeballos	(Italy) Nicole Fossa Huergo (Italy) Miriana Tona	5–7, 3–6
Win	7–11	Mar 2024	ITF Córdoba, Argentina	W15	Clay	(Spain) Alicia Herrero Liñana	(Ecuador) Camila Romero (Argentina) Candela Vázquez	6–2, 5–7, [10–5]
Win	8–11	Apr 2024	ITF Jackson, US	W35	Clay	(Spain) Alicia Herrero Liñana	(United States) Victoria Flores (Japan) Hiroko Kuwata	6–3, 2–6, [10–7]
Loss	8–12	Apr 2024	ITF Boca Raton, US	W35	Clay	(Spain) Alicia Herrero Liñana	(Russia) Maria Kononova (United States) Rasheeda McAdoo	6–2, 4–6, [5–10]
Win	9–12	Jun 2024	Sumter Open, US	W75	Hard	(Spain) Alicia Herrero Liñana	(United States) Sophie Chang (United States) Dalayna Hewitt	6–3, 6–3
Win	10–12	Jun 2024	ITF Wichita, US	W35	Hard	(Spain) Alicia Herrero Liñana	(United States) Ashton Bowers (United States) Sophia Webster	6–3, 6–3
Win	11–12	Jul 2024	Evansville Classic, US	W75	Hard	(Spain) Alicia Herrero Liñana	(Japan) Hiroko Kuwata (India) Sahaja Yamalapalli	6–2, 6–0
Win	12–12	Jul 2024	ITF Pilar, Argentina	W35	Clay	(Spain) Alicia Herrero Liñana	(Colombia) María Paulina Pérez (Bolivia) Noelia Zeballos	6–1, 6–3
