= Ava Markham =

American tennis player

- Country (sports): United States
- Residence: Demarest, New Jersey, US
- Born: December 29, 1999 (age 26)
- Height: 1.72 m (5 ft 8 in)
- Plays: Right (two-handed backhand)
- College: University of Wisconsin–Madison
- Prize money: $29,119

Singles
- Career record: 58–44
- Career titles: 1 ITF
- Highest ranking: No. 597 (April 8, 2024)
- Current ranking: No. 650 (August 24, 2026)

Doubles
- Career record: 22–18
- Career titles: 2 ITF
- Highest ranking: No. 301 (June 24, 2024)
- Last updated on: April 24, 2026.

Ava Markham (born December 29, 1999) is an American tennis player.

Raised in Demarest, New Jersey, Markham attended Northern Valley Regional High School at Demarest.

She has a career-high doubles ranking by the WTA of 301, achieved June 2024.

Markham won her biggest title to date at the 2022 The Women's Hospital Classic, where she partnered Kolie Allen to win the doubles draw.

== ITF Circuit finals ==
=== Singles: 1 (title) ===
| Legend W15 tournaments | Finals by surface Hard (1–0) |

| Result | Date | Tournament | Tier | Surface | Opponent | Score | |
|---|---|---|---|---|---|---|---|
| Win | 1–0 | Sep 2022 | ITF Cancún, Mexico | W15 | Hard | (Japan) Wakana Sonobe | 6–3, 3–6, 6–1 |

=== Doubles: 4 (2 titles, 2 runner-ups) ===
| Legend W60 tournaments W25 tournaments | Finals by surface Hard (2–2) |

| Result | W–L | Date | Tournament | Tier | Surface | Partner | Opponents | Score |
|---|---|---|---|---|---|---|---|---|
| Win | 1–0 | Jul 2022 | Evansville Classic, United States | W60 | Hard | (United States) Kolie Allen | (United States) Kylie Collins (United States) Ashlyn Krueger | 3–6, 6–1, [10–3] |
| Loss | 1–1 | Jun 2023 | ITF Wichita, United States | W25 | Hard | (Serbia) Alina Shcherbinina | (United States) Maria Mateas (United States) Reese Brantmeier | 2–6, 4–6 |
| Win | 2–1 | Jul 2023 | Lexington Challenger, United States | W60 | Hard | (United States) Alexis Blokhina | (Australia) Olivia Gadecki (United States) Dalayna Hewitt | 6–4, 7–6^{(1)} |
| Loss | 2–2 | Aug 2023 | ITF Valladolid, Spain | W25 | Hard | (China) Tian Fangran | (Australia) Alexandra Bozovic (United Kingdom) Sarah Beth Grey | 5–7, 0–6 |
