= Ashlyn Krueger =

American tennis player (born 2004)

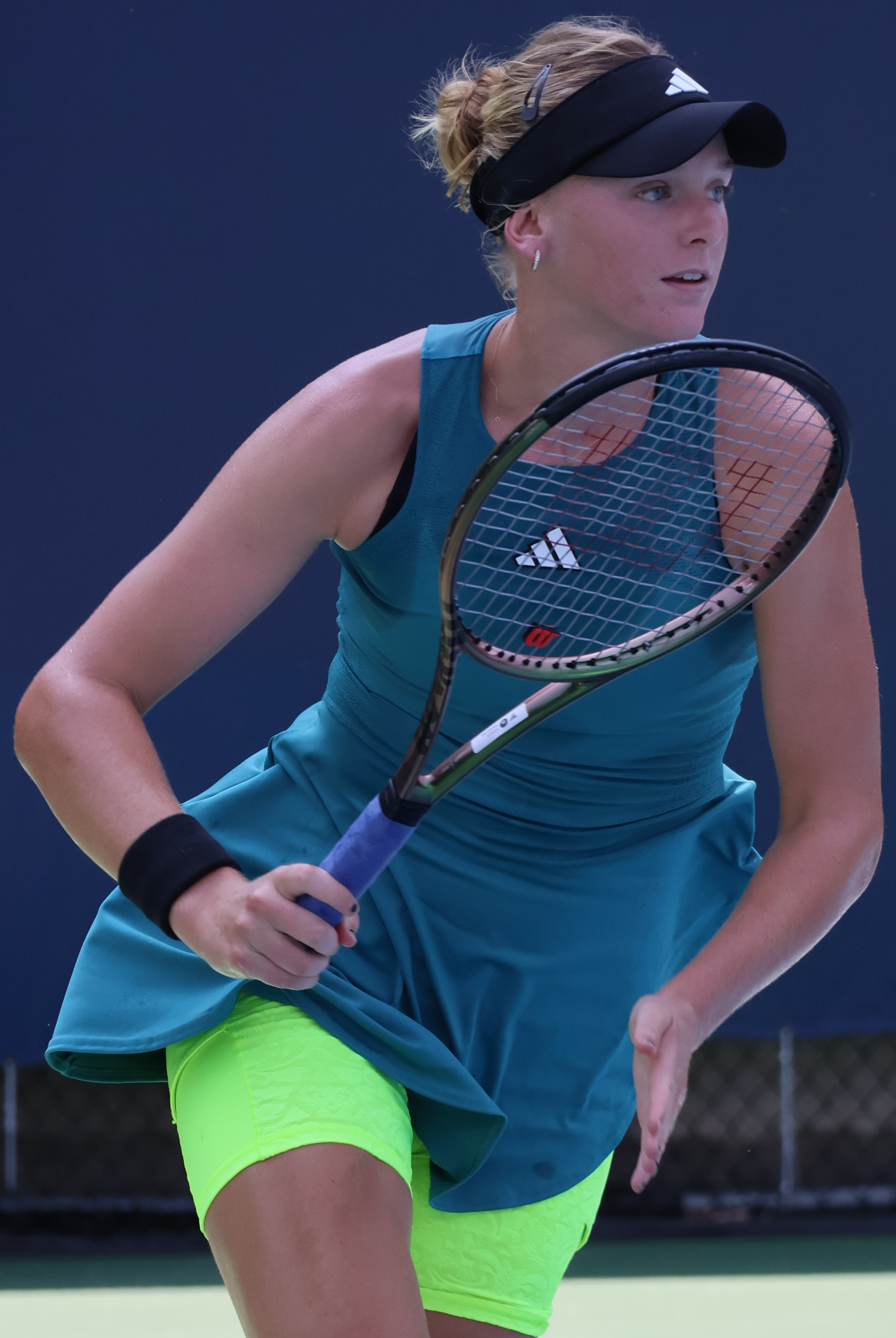
- Krueger at the 2023 Washington Open
- Country (sports): United States
- Residence: Dallas, Texas, US
- Born: May 7, 2004 (age 22) Springfield, Missouri, US
- Height: 1.85 m (6 ft 1 in)
- Plays: Right (two-handed backhand)
- Coach: Michael Joyce (2021-2025), Dave Anderson (2013-)
- Prize money: $4,228,657

Singles
- Career record: 191–148
- Career titles: 1
- Highest ranking: No. 29 (July 14, 2025)
- Current ranking: No. 68 (October 12, 2026)

Grand Slam singles results
- Australian Open: 2R (2026)
- French Open: 2R (2025)
- Wimbledon: 4R (2026)
- US Open: 3R (2024)

Doubles
- Career record: 75–66
- Career titles: 1
- Highest ranking: No. 62 (August 12, 2024)
- Current ranking: No. 66 (October 12, 2026)

Grand Slam doubles results
- Australian Open: 1R (2024, 2025, 2026)
- French Open: 1R (2024, 2025, 2026)
- Wimbledon: 1R (2023, 2024)
- US Open: F (2026)

Grand Slam mixed doubles results
- US Open: 2R (2023, 2024)

Team competitions
- Fed Cup: 0–1
- Last updated on: October 12, 2026.

Ashlyn Rose Krueger (born May 7, 2004) is an American professional tennis player. She has a career-high WTA singles ranking of world No. 29 achieved on July 14, 2025 and a doubles ranking of No. 62, reached on August 12, 2024. Krueger has won one singles title and one doubles title on the WTA Tour.

== Career ==
=== Juniors ===
In 2020, Ashlyn Krueger won the Orange Bowl tournament as a wildcard player.

=== 2021: WTA Tour, WTA 1000 and major debuts ===
Krueger made her WTA 1000 debut in Indian Wells, after receiving a wildcard for the main draw but lost to Tereza Martincová.

Krueger made her WTA Tour doubles debut at the 2021 Silicon Valley Classic, where she received a wildcard for the main draw, partnering Robin Montgomery. She also received a wildcard on her major debut at the 2021 US Open in singles and doubles.

=== 2022-23: WTA Tour quarterfinal and title, top 100 ===
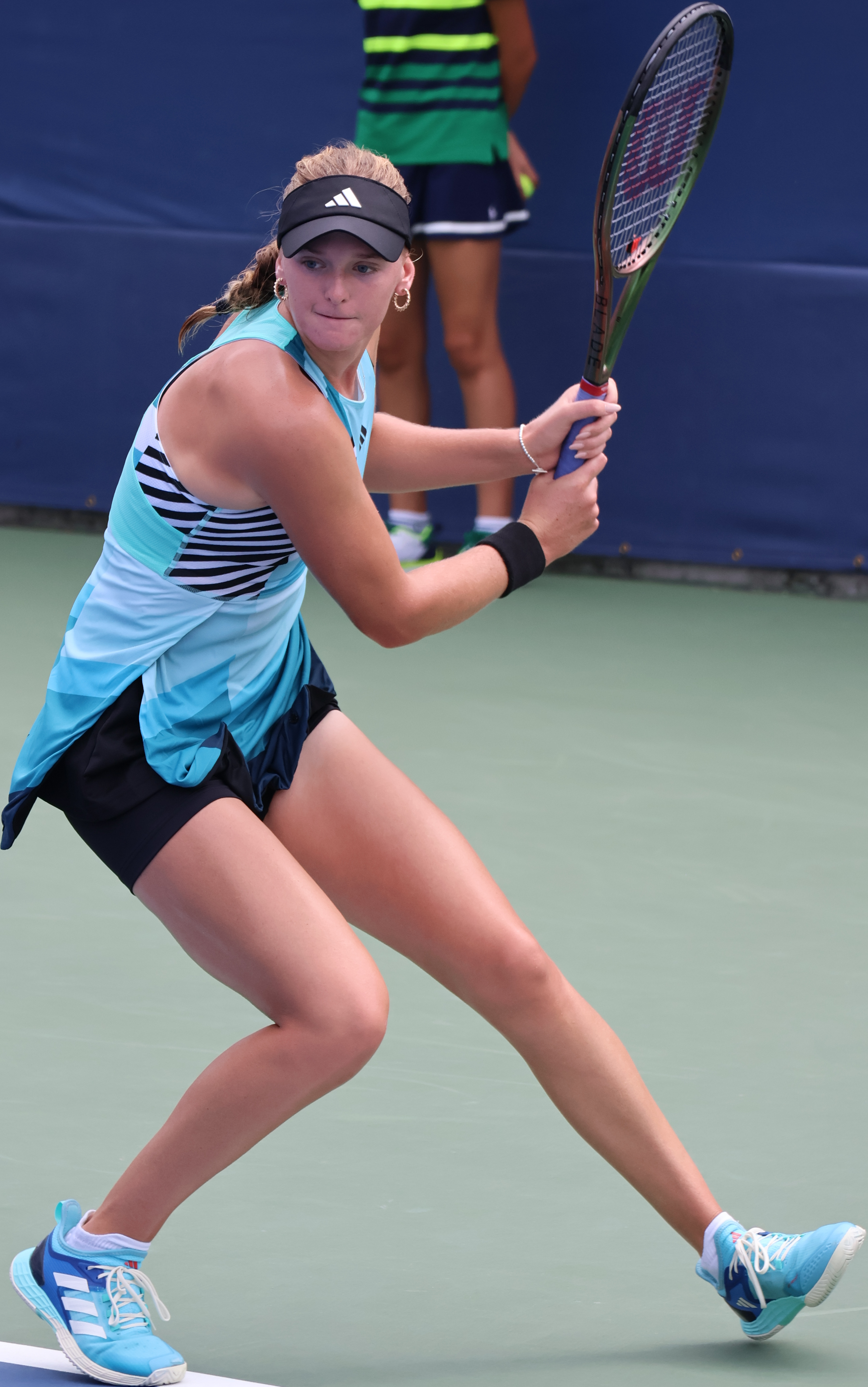
Krueger at the 2023 US Open

Krueger qualified for the main draw of the WTA 1000 in Indian Wells in 2022 and in 2023, after receiving a qualifying wildcard but on both occasions lost to Yulia Putintseva and Jil Teichmann, respectively. She also received wildcards for the main draw at the 2022 and the 2023 Miami Open but lost both first rounds to Wang Qiang and Erika Andreeva, respectively. At the 2022 US Open, Krueger competed thanks to a wildcard for the main draw but lost in the first round to Victoria Azarenka.

Krueger recorded her first top-20 victory over world No. 19, Viktoria Azarenka, at the 2023 Rosmalen Open, getting her revenge for the US Open loss, to reach her first WTA Tour quarterfinal where she lost to Viktória Hrunčáková. Krueger won her first WTA 125 title at the 2023 Veneto Open defeating Tatjana Maria in the final, in three sets.

She won her first WTA 250 title at the 2023 Japan Women's Open without dropping a set, defeating Zhu Lin in the final. As a result, she reached world No. 73, climbing 50 spots on 18 September 2023, becoming the seventh American to make her top 100 debut in 2023 and the first American teenager to crack the top 100 since Gauff as a 15-year-old on 14 October 2019. She qualified for the WTA 1000 China Open but lost in the first round to Ons Jabeur.

=== 2024: Major & two WTA 1000 third rounds ===
Krueger qualified for the WTA 1000 Qatar Ladies Open and lost to wildcard player Paula Badosa. Following a second round showing as a wildcard at the next WTA 1000, the Dubai Championships, with an upset over world No. 21, Caroline Garcia, she reached the top 70 in the rankings. It was her second career top 25 win and her first main-draw win in a WTA 1000 event. Krueger lost to Karolina Plíšková in three sets.

Playing with compatriot Sloane Stephens, Krueger won the doubles draw at the Charleston Open, winning the final in a deciding tiebreak against Ukrainian sisters Lyudmyla and Nadiia Kichenok.

At the Madrid Open, she reached the third round of a WTA 1000 for the first time defeating Nao Hibino and upsetting 14th seed Ekaterina Alexandrova, before losing to qualifier Sára Bejlek.

Krueger made the round of 16 at the Canadian Open as a qualifier, defeating Elisabetta Cocciaretto and 15th seed Leylah Fernandez. Despite missing out on the quarterfinals after a loss to Jessica Pegula, she climbed to a new career-high ranking in the top 65, moving close to 20 positions up in the rankings on 12 August 2024. She defeated former world No. 1, Naomi Osaka, in qualifying for the Cincinnati Open where she beat 16th seed Donna Vekić in the first round, before losing to Diana Shnaider.

At the US Open, she reached the third round of a major for the first time, defeating Zhang Shuai and upsetting world No. 21, Mirra Andreeva. Krueger lost to 16th seed Liudmila Samsonova in straight sets.

At the Guadalajara Open, she defeated Tatjana Maria, before losing in three sets to fifth seed and eventual champion, Magdalena Fręch, in three sets.

In November, Krueger made her Billie Jean King Cup debut, partnering Taylor Townsend in a losing effort in the deciding doubles match against Viktória Hrunčáková and Tereza Mihalíková as the US team was eliminated by Slovakia in the first round.

=== 2025: First WTA 500 final, top-10 win & top 30 ===
Krueger started her 2025 season at the Brisbane International, where she defeated Moyuka Uchijima, sixth seed Anna Kalinskaya and Suzan Lamens to reach her first WTA Tour quarterfinal since 2023. She lost in the last eight to qualifier Polina Kudermetova. The following week, Krueger gained entry into the Adelaide International as a lucky loser, and reached the quarterfinals, overcoming Marta Kostyuk and fifth seed Paula Badosa. She retired due to a thigh injury while trailing by a set and a break in her last eight match against top seed Jessica Pegula. Despite losing to wildcard entrant Ajla Tomljanović in the first round at the Australian Open, Krueger moved to a career-high of world No. 50, on 27 January 2025.

At the Abu Dhabi Open in February, she made it through to her first WTA 500 final with wins over McCartney Kessler, third seed Daria Kasatkina, eighth seed Leylah Fernandez and Linda Nosková. She lost the final to Belinda Bencic in three sets.

At the Miami Open, she reached the fourth round at a WTA 1000 event for the first time defeating Renata Zarazúa and then eighth seed Elena Rybakina for her first win against a top-10 ranked player. Krueger followed this up by overcoming 26th seed Leylah Fernandez, before losing to ninth seed Zheng Qinwen.

=== 2026: Major fourth round, WTA 125 title, major doubles final ===
In February at the ATX Open, Krueger recorded wins over seventh seed Caty McNally, Anastasia Zakharova and lucky loser Yuan Yue to reach the semifinals, at which point her run was ended by wildcard entrant Taylor Townsend. The following week at the WTA 1000 tournament in Indian Wells, she defeated Magda Linette and 19th seed Liudmila Samsonova, before losing to ninth seed Elina Svitolina in the third round.

In June, Krueger won the WTA 125 Ilkley Open, defeating qualifier Céline Naef in the final. She qualified for the main draw at Wimbledon, and then overcame 31st seed Donna Vekić, fellow qualifier Mariam Bolkvadze and Daria Snigur to make it through to a major fourth round for the first time, at which point she lost to 12th seed Marta Kostyuk, bringing an end to her 11 match winning streak. As a result, she returned to the top 100 in the singles rankings, at world No. 66 on 13 July 2026.

Teaming up with Robin Montgomery as a wildcard pairing, Krueger reached her first major final in doubles at the US Open, losing to top seeds Kateřina Siniaková and Taylor Townsend in three sets. In October at the Wuhan Open, entering the main-draw as a lucky loser, she defeated Zhang Shuai and fellow lucky loser Lanlana Tararudee to make it through to the third round, where she lost to seventh seed Iga Świątek. Krueger continued her good form the next week at the Japan Open, recording wins over sixth seed Janice Tjen, Lanlana Tararudee, fourth seed Talia Gibson and top seed Ann Li. to reach the final, which she lost to Kateřina Siniaková.

== Performance timeline ==
Key
W	F	SF	QF	#R	RR	Q#	P#	DNQ	A	Z#	PO	G	S	B	NMS	NTI	P	NH

(W) winner; (F) finalist; (SF) semifinalist; (QF) quarterfinalist; (#R) rounds 4, 3, 2, 1; (RR) round-robin stage; (Q#) qualification round; (P#) preliminary round; (DNQ) did not qualify; (A) absent; (Z#) Davis/Fed Cup Zonal Group (with number indication) or (PO) play-off; (G) gold, (S) silver or (B) bronze Olympic/Paralympic medal; (NMS) not a Masters tournament; (NTI) not a Tier I tournament; (P) postponed; (NH) not held; (SR) strike rate (events won / competed); (W–L) win–loss record.
To avoid confusion and double counting, these charts are updated at the conclusion of a tournament or when the player's participation has ended.

Only main-draw results in WTA Tour, Grand Slam tournaments, Fed Cup/Billie Jean King Cup, Hopman Cup, United Cup and Olympic Games are included in win–loss records.

=== Singles ===
Current through the 2026 Wuhan Open.

Tournament	2021	2022	2023	2024	2025	2026	SR	W–L	Win %
Grand Slam tournaments
Australian Open	A	A	Q2	1R	1R	2R	0 / 3	1–3	25%
French Open	A	A	Q3	1R	2R	1R	0 / 3	1–3	25%
Wimbledon	A	A	Q2	1R	2R	4R	0 / 3	4–3	57%
US Open	1R	1R	1R	3R	2R	1R	0 / 6	3–6	33%
Win–Loss	0–1	0–1	0–1	2–4	3–4	4–4	0 / 15	9–15	38%
WTA 1000 tournaments
Qatar Open	NTI	A	NTI	1R	1R	A	0 / 2	0–2	0%
Dubai Championships	A	NTI	A	2R	Q2	A	0 / 1	1–1	50%
Indian Wells	1R	1R	1R	1R	2R	3R	0 / 6	3–6	33%
Miami Open	A	1R	1R	1R	4R	1R	0 / 5	3–5	38%
Madrid Open	A	A	A	3R	1R	1R	0 / 3	2–3	40%
Italian Open	A	A	A	1R	2R	Q1	0 / 2	1–2	33%
Canadian Open	A	A	Q2	3R	2R	A	0 / 2	3–2	60%
Cincinnati Open	A	A	A	2R	3R	1R	0 / 3	3–3	50%
China Open	NH		1R	3R	1R	2R	0 / 4	3–4	43%
Wuhan Open	NH			1R	1R	3R	0 / 3	2–3	40%
Win–Loss	0–1	0–2	0–3	8–10	8–9	5–6	0 / 31	21–31	40%
Career statistics
	2021	2022	2023	2024	2025	2026	SR	W–L	Win %
Tournaments	2	4	9	23	20	9	Career total: 59		
Titles	0	0	1	0	0	0	Career total: 1		
Finals	0	0	1	0	1	0	Career total: 2		
Hard Win–Loss	0–2	0–4	6–7	10–16	16–13	6–6	0 / 49	38–48	44%
Clay Win–Loss	0–0	0–0	0–0	3–4	4–5	1–2	0 / 11	8–11	42%
Grass Win–Loss	0–0	0–0	2–1	2–3	1–2	3–1	0 / 7	8–7	53%
Overall Win–Loss	0–2	0–4	8–8	15–23	21–20	10–9	0 / 67	54–66	45%
Win %	0%	0%	50%	39%	51%	53%	45%		
Year-end ranking	536	178	81	65	45		$3,802,547		

== Grand Slam tournaments finals ==
=== Doubles: 1 (runner-up) ===
Result	Year	Tournament	Surface	Partner	Opponents	Score
Loss	2026	US Open	Hard	(United States) Robin Montgomery	(Czech Republic) Kateřina Siniaková (United States) Taylor Townsend	7–5, 0–6, 2–6

== WTA Tour finals ==
=== Singles: 3 (1 title, 2 runner-ups) ===
Legend WTA 500 (0–1) WTA 250 (1–1)	Finals by surface Hard (1–2)	Finals by setting Outdoor (1–2)

Result	W–L	Date	Tournament	Tier	Surface	Opponent	Score
Win	1–0	Sep 2023	Japan Women's Open, Japan	WTA 250	Hard	(China) Zhu Lin	6–3, 7–6^{(8–6)}
Loss	1–1	Feb 2025	Abu Dhabi Open, UAE	WTA 500	Hard	(Switzerland) Belinda Bencic	6–4, 1–6, 1–6
Loss	1–2	Oct 2026	Japan Women's Open, Japan	WTA 250	Hard	(Czech Republic) Kateřina Siniaková	1–6, 0–6

=== Doubles: 2 (1 title, 1 runner-up) ===
Legend Grand Slam (0–1) WTA 500 (1–0)	Finals by surface Hard (0–1) Clay (1–0)	Finals by setting Outdoor (1–1)

Result	W–L	Date	Tournament	Tier	Surface	Partner	Opponents	Score
Win	1–0	Apr 2024	Charleston Open, US	WTA 500	Clay	(United States) Sloane Stephens	(Ukraine) Lyudmyla Kichenok (Ukraine) Nadiia Kichenok	1–6, 6–3, [10–7]
Loss	1–1	Sep 2026	US Open, US	Grand Slam	Hard	(United States) Robin Montgomery	(Czech Republic) Kateřina Siniaková (United States) Taylor Townsend	7–5, 0–6, 2–6

== WTA 125 finals ==
=== Singles: 2 (titles) ===
Result	W–L	Date	Tournament	Surface	Opponent	Score
Win	1–0	Jun 2023	Veneto Open, Italy	Grass	(Germany) Tatjana Maria	3–6, 6–4, 7–5
Win	2–0	Jun 2026	Ilkley Open, UK	Grass	(Switzerland) Céline Naef	7–5, 6–2

=== Doubles: 1 (runner-up) ===
Result	W–L	Date	Tournament	Surface	Partner	Opponents	Score
Loss	0–1	Oct 2022	Abierto Tampico, Mexico	Hard	(United States) Elizabeth Mandlik	(Slovakia) Tereza Mihalíková (Indonesia) Aldila Sutjiadi	5–7, 2–6

== ITF Circuit finals ==
=== Singles: 3 (1 title, 2 runner-ups) ===
Legend $60,000 tournaments (1–1) $25,000 tournaments (0–1)	Finals by surface Hard (1–0) Clay (0–2)

Result	W–L	Date	Tournament	Tier	Surface	Opponent	Score
Loss	0–1	May 2022	ITF Sarasota, US	W25	Clay	(United States) Elizabeth Halbauer	5–7, 2–6
Win	1–1	Jul 2022	Evansville Classic, US	W60	Hard	(United States) Sachia Vickery	6–3, 7–5
Loss	1–2	Apr 2023	Charlottesville Open, US	W60	Clay	(United States) Emma Navarro	1–6, 1–6

=== Doubles: 7 (2 titles, 5 runner-ups) ===
Legend $100,000 tournaments (0–2) $60,000 tournaments (2–1) $15,000 tournaments (0–2)	Finals by surface Hard (2–2) Clay (0–3)

Result	W–L	Date	Tournament	Tier	Surface	Partner	Opponents	Score
Loss	0–1	Jun 2019	ITF Orlando, US	15,000	Clay	(United States) Kimmi Hance	(United States) Allura Zamarripa (United States) Maribella Zamarripa	3–6, 1–6
Loss	0–2	Sep 2019	ITF Lubbock, US	15,000	Hard	(Japan) Shiori Fukuda	(Mexico) María Portillo Ramírez (United States) Sofia Sewing	2–6, 4–6
Win	1–2	Mar 2022	Arcadia Pro Open, US	W60	Hard	(United States) Robin Montgomery	(Mexico) Giuliana Olmos (United Kingdom) Harriet Dart	w/o
Loss	1–3	Jul 2022	Evansville Classic, US	W60	Hard	(United States) Kylie Collins	(United States) Kolie Allen (United States) Ava Markham	6–3, 1–6, [3–10]
Win	2–3	Feb 2023	ITF Orlando Pro, US	W60	Hard	(United States) Robin Montgomery	(Netherlands) Arianne Hartono (Netherlands) Eva Vedder	7–5, 6–1
Loss	2–4	Apr 2023	ITF Charleston Pro, US	W100	Clay	(United States) Robin Montgomery	(United States) Sophie Chang (United States) Angela Kulikov	3–6, 4–6
Loss	2–5	May 2023	Bonita Springs Pro, US	W100	Clay	(United States) Robin Montgomery	(United States) Jamie Loeb (United States) Makenna Jones	7–5, 4–6, [2–10]

== Junior Grand Slam tournament finals ==
=== Doubles: 1 (title) ===
Result	Year	Tournament	Surface	Partner	Opponents	Score
Win	2021	US Open	Hard	(United States) Robin Montgomery	(United States) Reese Brantmeier (United States) Elvina Kalieva	5–7, 6–3, [10–4]

== Wins against top-10 players ==
- Krueger has a 1–6 record against players who were, at the time the match was played, ranked in the top 10.

#	Opponent	Rk	Event	Surface	Rd	Score	LSR	Ref
2025
1.	(Kazakhstan) Elena Rybakina	8	Miami Open, United States	Hard	2R	6–4, 2–6, 6–4	40	
