= The Women's Hospital Classic =

- 2026 The Women's Hospital Classic

Women's World Tennis Tour
- Event name: The Women's Hospital Classic
- Location: Evansville, Indiana, United States
- Venue: Wesselman Tennis Center
- Category: ITF Women's World Tennis Tour
- Surface: Hard / outdoor
- Draw: 32S/32Q/16D
- Prize money: $100,000

The Women's Hospital Classic is a tournament for professional female tennis players played on outdoor hardcourts. The event is classified as a $100,000 ITF Women's World Tennis Tour tournament and has been held in Evansville, Indiana, United States, since 1999.

== Past finals ==
=== Singles ===
Year	Champion	Runner-up	Score
2026	(United States) Caroline Dolehide	(South Korea) Ku Yeon-woo	7–6^{(7–3)}, 7–6^{(7–5)}
2025	(United States) Caty McNally	(Czech Republic) Darja Vidmanova	7–5, 6–4
2024	(United States) Sophie Chang	(United States) Mary Stoiana	4–6, 7–6^{(7–5)}, 6–3
2023	(India) Karman Thandi	(Ukraine) Yulia Starodubtseva	7–5, 4–6, 6–1
2022	(United States) Ashlyn Krueger	(United States) Sachia Vickery	6–3, 7–5
2021	(Canada) Rebecca Marino	(Japan) Mayo Hibi	6–3, 3–6, 6–0
2020	Tournament cancelled due to the COVID-19 pandemic		
2019	(United States) Grace Min	(Israel) Deniz Khazaniuk	7–6^{(9–7)}, 4–6, 7–5
2018	(United States) Elysia Bolton	(United States) Connie Ma	6–3, 4–6, 6–3
2017	(United States) Ann Li	(Mexico) Marcela Zacarías	4–6, 6–4, 6–3
2016	(United States) Kennedy Shaffer	(United States) Emina Bektas	6–4, 1–6, 6–2
2015	(United States) Lauren Herring	(United States) Andie Daniell	4–6, 6–2, 6–0
2014	(United States) Tornado Alicia Black	(United States) Caitlin Whoriskey	6–4, 4–6, 6–2
2013	(United States) Emina Bektas	(United States) Brooke Austin	4–6, 6–4, 6–3
2012	(United States) Mallory Burdette	(China) Duan Yingying	6–1, 6–2
2011	(United States) Elizabeth Ferris	(United States) Nicole Melichar	6–2, 6–1
2010	(Venezuela) Gabriela Paz	(United States) Chiara Scholl	6–4, 6–0
2009	(United States) Elizabeth Lumpkin	(United States) Kaitlyn Christian	6–0, 6–2
2008	(United States) Megan Moulton-Levy	(United Kingdom) Emily Webley-Smith	6–3, 6–4
2007	(United States) Kimberly Couts	(Bosnia and Herzegovina) Helena Bešović	7–6^{(7–3)}, 7–5
2006	(United States) Audra Cohen	(United States) Lauren Albanese	2–6, 6–2, 6–1
2005	(United States) Sarah Taylor	(United States) Kristi Miller	7–6^{(10–8)}, 6–1
2004	(United States) Nicole Leimbach	(Romania) Anda Perianu	6–3, 6–1
2003	(United States) Stephanie Hazlett	(Haiti) Neyssa Etienne	6–4, 6–3
2002	(United States) Shadisha Robinson	(Australia) Deanna Roberts	6–4, 7–5
2001	(South Africa) Chanelle Scheepers	(United States) Kristen Schlukebir	6–1, 6–3
2000	(United States) Kelly McCain	(United States) Stephanie Hazlett	6–3, 6–4
1999	(United States) Kristina Kraszewski	(South Africa) Lara van Rooyen	6–3, 6–4

=== Doubles ===
Year	Champions	Runners-up	Score
2026	(Chinese Taipei) Cho I-hsuan (Chinese Taipei) Cho Yi-tsen	(Canada) Kayla Cross (United States) Anna Rogers	6–2, 6–3
2025	(Netherlands) Arianne Hartono (India) Prarthana Thombare	(United States) Ayana Akli (United States) Victoria Osuigwe	6–3, 6–3
2024	(Spain) Alicia Herrero Liñana (Argentina) Melany Krywoj	(Japan) Hiroko Kuwata (India) Sahaja Yamalapalli	6–2, 6–0
2023	Maria Kononova; Veronika Miroshnichenko	(United States) McCartney Kessler (Ukraine) Yulia Starodubtseva	6–3, 2–6, [10–8]
2022	(United States) Kolie Allen (United States) Ava Markham	(United States) Kylie Collins (United States) Ashlyn Krueger	3–6, 6–1, [10–3]
2021	(United States) Kylie Collins (United States) Robin Montgomery	(United States) Lauren Proctor (United States) Anna Ulyashchenko	5–7, 6–3, [10–2]
2020	Tournament cancelled due to the COVID-19 pandemic		
2019	(Chinese Taipei) Hsu Chieh-yu (South Africa) Chanel Simmonds	(Japan) Haruna Arakawa (United States) Pamela Montez	6–2, 6–0
2018	(United States) Connie Ma (United States) Gianna Pielet	(United States) Meghan Kelley (United States) Bianca Moldovan	6–3, 7–5
2017	(United States) Lorraine Guillermo (United States) Madeleine Kobelt	(Brazil) Alice Garcia (United States) Lauren Proctor	6–0, 6–3
2016	(United States) Sophie Chang (United States) Alexandra Mueller	(United States) Brynn Boren (United States) Keri Wong	6–1, 6–4
2015	(Thailand) Nicha Lertpitaksinchai (Thailand) Peangtarn Plipuech	(United States) Lauren Herring (United States) Kennedy Shaffer	6–2, 6–3
2014	(United States) Brooke Austin (United States) Natalie Pluskota	(United States) Catherine Harrison (United States) Mary Weatherholt	6–4, 3–6, [11–9]
2013	(United States) Emina Bektas (United States) Brooke Bolender	(United States) Denise Muresan (United States) Jacqueline Wu	6–4, 6–4
2012	(China) Duan Yingying (China) Xu Yifan	(United States) Mallory Burdette (United States) Natalie Pluskota	6–2, 6–3
2011	(United States) Brynn Boren (United States) Sabrina Santamaria	(United States) Nadia Echeverría Alam (United States) Elizabeth Ferris	6–4, 4–6, [11–9]
2010	(United States) Brynn Boren (United States) Sabrina Santamaria	(Ukraine) Anastasia Kharchenko (Venezuela) Gabriela Paz	6–3, 6–4
2009	(United States) Maria Sanchez (United States) Yasmin Schnack	(United States) Kaitlyn Christian (United States) Lindsey Nelson	4–6, 6–1, [10–4]
2008	(Canada) Rebecca Marino (United States) Ellah Nze	(United States) Courtney Dolehide (United States) Kirsten Flower	7–5, 6–3
2007	(United States) Jenna Long (United States) Anna Lubinsky	(Bosnia and Herzegovina) Helena Bešović (Norway) Nina Munch-Søgaard	6–1, 3–6, 6–2
2006	(United States) Beau Jones (United States) Tiya Rolle	(United States) Alexandra McGoodwin (Canada) Stephanie Roy	6–3, 7–6^{(7–3)}
2005	(Indonesia) Wynne Prakusya (Indonesia) Romana Tedjakusuma	(United States) Kristi Miller (United States) Christian Tara	6–0, 6–1
2004	(United States) Kelly Schmandt (United States) Aleke Tsoubanos	(Egypt) Haidy El Tabakh (United States) Vania King	6–4, 6–4
2003	(United States) Tamara Encina (United States) Alison Ojeda	(United States) Stephanie Hazlett (United States) Julia Scaringe	4–6, 6–4, 6–3
2002	(South Korea) Kim Jin-hee (Japan) Aiko Nakamura	(Australia) Gabrielle Baker (Australia) Deanna Roberts	6–4, 6–0
2001	(Puerto Rico) Vilmarie Castellvi (United States) Alison Ojeda	(South Africa) Anca Anastasiu (South Africa) Lara van Rooyen	6–2, 6–3
2000	(Japan) Tomoe Hotta (Japan) Ryoko Takemura	(Japan) Rika Fujiwara (United States) Anne Plessinger	6–4, 6–1
1999	(United States) Amanda Johnson (United States) Andrea Nathan	(United States) Amanda Augustus (United States) Elizabeth Schmidt	6–4, 3–6, 6–3
