= Sahaja Yamalapalli =

Indian tennis player (born 2000)

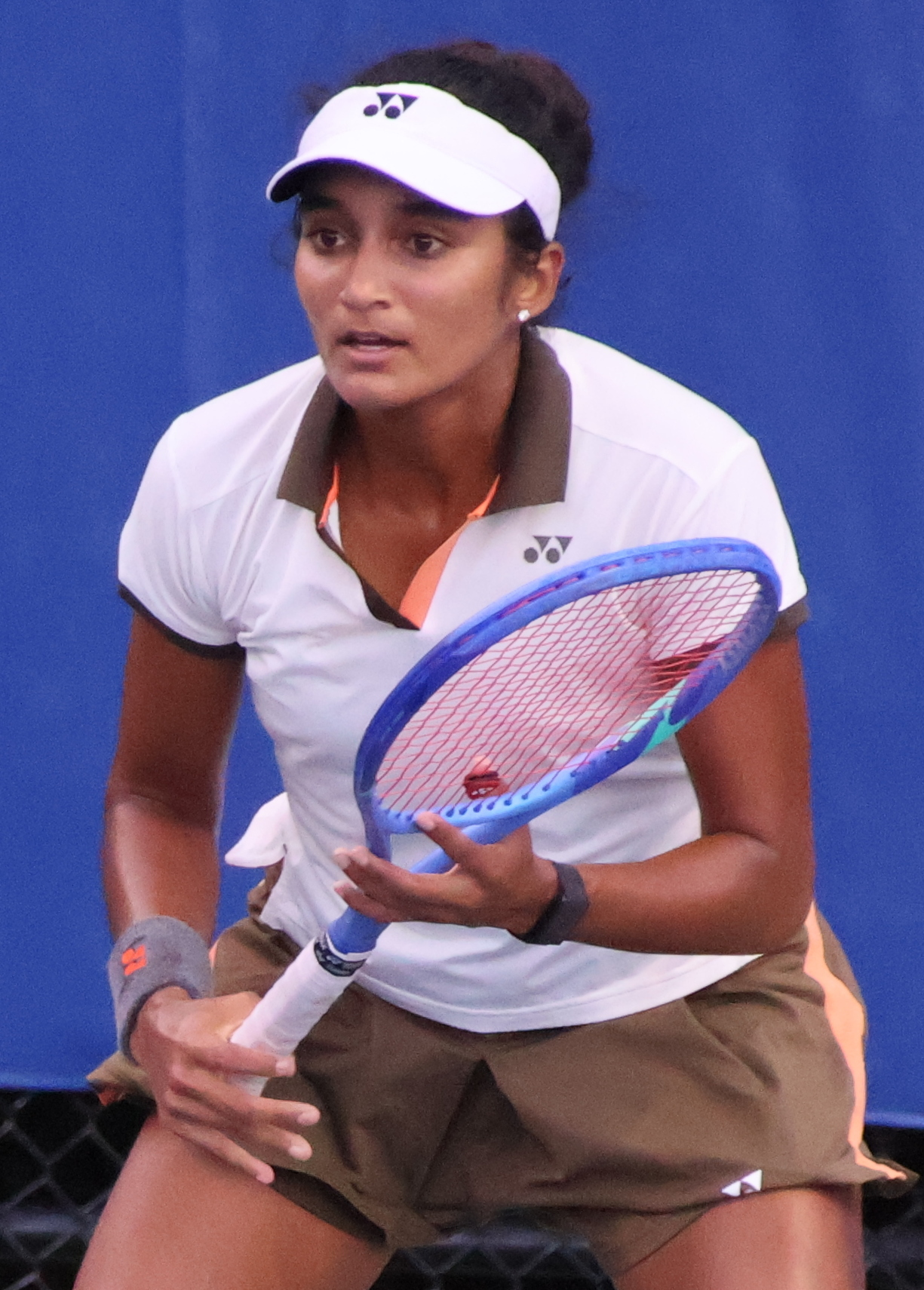
- Yamalapalli in 2026
- Full name: Sahaja Yamalapalli
- Country (sports): India
- Born: 29 October 2000 (age 25) Hyderabad, India
- Turned pro: 2021
- Plays: Right (two-handed backhand)
- College: Sam Houston State University
- Coach: Prahlad Kumar Jain
- Prize money: $128,112

Singles
- Career record: 151–131
- Career titles: 4 ITF
- Highest ranking: No. 284 (21 October 2024)
- Current ranking: No. 378 (19 October 2026)

Doubles
- Career record: 54–87
- Career titles: 3 ITF
- Highest ranking: No. 260 (12 October 2026)
- Current ranking: No. 300 (19 October 2026)

Team competitions
- Fed Cup: 2–9
- Last updated on: 23 October 2026.

Sahaja Yamalapalli (born 29 October 2000) is an Indian tennis player. She is India's number one in women's tennis. She has career-high rankings of world No. 284 in singles, achieved in October 2024, and No. 260 in doubles, achieved on 12 October 2026. As of June 2026, Sahaja has won four ITF titles in singles, and three in doubles. She has been representing the India Billie Jean King Cup team since 2023, with a win–loss record 2–9.

== Early life ==
Yamalapalli was born on 29 October 2000 in Hyderabad, India. Her mother is Supriya while her father Bhavaniprasad Yamalapalli works at an engineering college.

She started playing tennis at the age of ten. Yamalapalli graduated from Sam Houston State University in 2017 where she majored in Food Science and Nutrition. She has won the Player of the Year Award for collegiate tennis. She was the second tennis player in the university's history to be honored with the award, the first being Irina Sotnikova.

She was also the first women's tennis player who earned ITA national ranking 110 in the university's history while also becoming the first player to ever crack the ITA NCAA national ranking. Yamalapalli was Southland Conference women's tennis student-athlete of the year 2018, 2019 and 2021 for being top in studies and sports.

== Career ==
Yamalapalli made her debut on the ITF Women's World Tennis Tour in 2021. She won her first main-draw match in a WTA 125 event at the Mumbai Open in February 2024. She won the SoCal Pro Series and became the third Indian women's tennis player to win an ITF pro title. She also won the ECT ITF women's singles title. She mainly plays tournaments on the ITF World Tour, where she has won four titles in the singles and one in the doubles.

In October 2025, Yamalapalli made her WTA Tour main-draw debut as a wildcard entrant at the Chennai Open and defeated lucky loser Priska Nugroho, before losing to third seed Donna Vekić, in the second round.

== ITF Circuit finals ==
=== Singles: 6 (4 titles, 2 runner-ups) ===
Legend
W25/35 tournaments
W15 tournaments

Result	W–L	Date	Tournament	Tier	Surface	Opponent	Score
Win	1–0	Mar 2022	ITF Nagpur, India	W15	Clay	(Germany) Emily Seibold	6–5 ret.
Win	2–0	Jul 2022	ITF Gurugram, India	W25	Hard	(Slovakia) Viktória Morvayová	6–3, 7–6^{(5)}
Loss	2–1	Jul 2023	ITF Nakhon Si Thammarat, Thailand	W25	Hard	(Thailand) Mananchaya Sawangkaew	4–6, 0–6
Win	3–1	Dec 2023	ITF Solapur, India	W25	Hard	Ekaterina Makarova	6–4, 6–3
Win	4–1	Jun 2024	ITF Los Angeles, United States	W15	Hard	(United States) Amy Zhu	6–4, 7–6^{(4)}
Loss	4–2	May 2026	ITF Wichita, United States	W35	Hard	(United States) Reese Brantmeier	4–6, 0–6

=== Doubles: 5 (3 titles, 2 runner-ups) ===
Legend
W75 tournaments
W50 tournaments
W35 tournaments

Result	W–L	Date	Tournament	Tier	Surface	Partner	Opponents	Score
Loss	0–1	Jul 2024	Evansville Classic, United States	W75	Hard	(Japan) Hiroko Kuwata	(Spain) Alicia Herrero Liñana (Argentina) Melany Krywoj	2–6, 0–6
Loss	0–2	Sep 2024	ITF Punta Cana, Dominican Republic	W35	Clay	(Kazakhstan) Zhibek Kulambayeva	(Canada) Ariana Arseneault (Canada) Kayla Cross	1–6, 7–5, [8–10]
Win	1–2	Jun 2025	ITF Santo Domingo, Dominican Republic	W35	Hard	(Japan) Hiroko Kuwata	(United Kingdom) Esther Adeshina (Venezuela) Sofía Cabezas Domínguez	6–3, 6–2
Win	2–2	Sep 2026	Le Neubourg Open, France	W75	Hard	(United Kingdom) Naiktha Bains	(Poland) Martyna Kubka (Czech Republic) Anna Sisková	3–6, 6–4, [11–9]
Win	3–2	Oct 2026	Lexington Challenger, United States	W50	Hard	(Morocco) Diae El Jardi	(United States) Dalayna Hewitt (Ukraine) Valeriya Strakhova	2–6, 7–5, [12–10]

== See also ==
- Tennis in India
