= 2024 Internazionali Femminili di Tennis Città di Caserta =

Tennis tournament

- Date: 3–9 June 2024
- Edition: 35th
- Category: ITF Women's World Tennis Tour
- Prize money: $60,000
- Surface: Clay / Outdoor
- Location: Caserta, Italy

Champions

Singles
- (Spain) Leyre Romero Gormaz

Doubles
- (Colombia) Yuliana Lizarazo / (Greece) Despina Papamichail
← 2023 ·	Internazionali Femminili di Tennis Città di Caserta	· 2025 →

The 2024 Internazionali Femminili di Tennis Città di Caserta was a professional tennis tournament playing on outdoor clay courts. It was the thirty-fifth edition of the tournament, which was part of the 2024 ITF Women's World Tennis Tour. It took place in Caserta, Italy, between 3 and 9 June 2024.

== Champions ==
=== Singles ===
- (Spain) Leyre Romero Gormaz def. (Switzerland) Jil Teichmann, 6–2, 4–6, 6–4

=== Doubles ===
- (Colombia) Yuliana Lizarazo / (Greece) Despina Papamichail def. (United Kingdom) Ali Collins / (Colombia) María Paulina Pérez, 4–6, 6–3, [10–3]

== Singles main draw entrants ==
=== Seeds ===
Country	Player	Rank	Seed
BRA	Laura Pigossi	119	1
FRA	Carole Monnet	190	2
AUS	Priscilla Hon	211	3
SUI	Jil Teichmann	214	4
ESP	Leyre Romero Gormaz	216	5
ROU	Andreea Mitu	222	6
GRE	Despina Papamichail	229	7
FRA	Séléna Janicijevic	235	8

- Rankings are as of 27 May 2024.

=== Other entrants ===
The following players received wildcards into the singles main draw:

- (Italy) Anastasia Abbagnato
- (Italy) Antonia Aragosa
- (Italy) Sofia Rocchetti
- (Italy) Jennifer Ruggeri

The following players received entry from the qualifying draw:

- (Italy) Diletta Cherubini
- (Italy) Federica Di Sarra
- (Italy) Nicole Fossa Huergo
- Victoria Kan
- (Colombia) Yuliana Lizarazo
- (Italy) Angelica Raggi
- (Italy) Gaia Squarcialupi
- Anna Zyryanova

The following player received entry as a lucky loser:

- (Romania) Maria Toma
