= 2022 Internazionali Femminili di Tennis Città di Caserta =

Tennis tournament

- Date: 6–12 June 2022
- Edition: 33rd
- Category: ITF Women's World Tennis Tour
- Prize money: $60,000
- Surface: Clay / Outdoor
- Location: Caserta, Italy

Champions

Singles
- (France) Kristina Mladenovic

Doubles
- (Greece) Despina Papamichail / (Italy) Camilla Rosatello
← 2019 ·	Internazionali Femminili di Tennis Città di Caserta	· 2023 →

The 2022 Internazionali Femminili di Tennis Città di Caserta was a professional tennis tournament played on outdoor clay courts. It was the thirty-third edition of the tournament which was part of the 2022 ITF Women's World Tennis Tour. It took place in Caserta, Italy between 6 and 12 June 2022.

== Champions ==
=== Singles ===
- (France) Kristina Mladenovic def. (Italy) Camilla Rosatello, 6–4, 4–6, 7–6^{(7–3)}

=== Doubles ===
- (Greece) Despina Papamichail / (Italy) Camilla Rosatello def. (Portugal) Francisca Jorge / (Portugal) Matilde Jorge, 4–6, 6–2, [10–6]

== Singles main draw entrants ==
=== Seeds ===
Country	Player	Rank^{1}	Seed
FRA	Clara Burel	94	1
FRA	Kristina Mladenovic	107	2
	Elina Avanesyan	138	3
GRE	Despina Papamichail	170	4
JPN	Moyuka Uchijima	209	5
SUI	Simona Waltert	211	6
ITA	Federica Di Sarra	212	7
LAT	Daniela Vismane	230	8

- ^{1} Rankings are as of 23 May 2022.

=== Other entrants ===
The following players received wildcards into the singles main draw:

- (Italy) Antonia Aragosa
- (Italy) Nuria Brancaccio
- (Italy) Melania Delai
- (Italy) Lisa Pigato

The following players received entry from the qualifying draw:

- (Italy) Federica Bilardo
- (Italy) Diletta Cherubini
- (Romania) Oana Gavrilă
- (Kazakhstan) Zhibek Kulambayeva
- (Italy) Irene Lavino
- (Estonia) Elena Malõgina
- (United Kingdom) Matilda Mutavdzic
- (Italy) Angelica Raggi
