= 2025 Internazionali di Calabria – Singles =

Singles
- 2025 Internazionali di Calabria

Final
- Champion: (Czech Republic) Sára Bejlek
- Runner-up: (Serbia) Lola Radivojević
- Score: 6–2, 6–7^{(1–7)}, 6–3

Events
Singles	Doubles
Internazionali di Calabria	· 2026 →

This was the first edition of the tournament.

Sára Bejlek won the title, defeating Lola Radivojević 6–2, 6–7^{(1–7)}, 6–3 in the final.

== Seeds ==
1. (Egypt) Mayar Sherif (second round)
2. (Latvia) Darja Semeņistaja (second round)
3. (Switzerland) Simona Waltert (quarterfinals)
4. (Czech Republic) Sára Bejlek (champion)
5. (United States) Bernarda Pera (first round)
6. (Austria) Julia Grabher (second round)
7. Oksana Selekhmeteva (quarterfinals)
8. (Spain) Leyre Romero Gormaz (first round)

== Draw ==
=== Key ===
- Q = Qualifier
- WC = Wild card
- LL = Lucky loser
- Alt = Alternate
- ITF = ITF entry
- PR = Protected ranking
- SR = Special ranking
- SE = Special exempt
- JE = Junior exempt
- JR = Junior Accelerator Programme entrant
- CO = College Accelerator Programme entrant
- NG = Next Gen Accelerator Program entrant
- w/o = Walkover
- r = Retired
- d = Defaulted

=== Finals ===
Semifinals
(Slovenia) Tamara Zidanšek	6	5	2
(Serbia) Lola Radivojević	4	7	6
4	(Czech Republic) Sára Bejlek	6	6
(Poland) Maja Chwalińska	3	2

Final
(Serbia) Lola Radivojević	2	7^{7}	3
4	(Czech Republic) Sára Bejlek	6	6^{1}	6

=== Top half ===
First round
1	(Egypt) M Sherif	6	6
WC	(Italy) T Pieri	2	3
(Spain) A Lázaro García	4	4
(Slovenia) T Zidanšek	6	6
Q	(Italy) A Abbagnato	6	6
WC	(Italy) N Fossa Huergo	1	1
WC	(Italy) A Zantedeschi	7	3	6
8	(Spain) L Romero Gormaz	5	6	1
3	(Switzerland) S Waltert	4	6	7^{7}
(Austria) S Kraus	6	2	6^{4}
Q	(France) T Lemaître	6	6
LL	(Switzerland) L Küng	2	3
(Netherlands) A Koevermans	1	0
(Serbia) L Radivojević	6	6
Q	(Italy) D Chiesa	3	1
6	(Austria) J Grabher	6	6

Second round
1	(Egypt) M Sherif	3	4
(Slovenia) T Zidanšek	6	6
Q	(Italy) A Abbagnato	6	4	6
WC	(Italy) A Zantedeschi	4	6	3
3	(Switzerland) S Waltert	6	6
Q	(France) T Lemaître	1	0
(Serbia) L Radivojević	6	6
6	(Austria) J Grabher	0	4

Quarterfinals
(Slovenia) T Zidanšek	6	6
Q	(Italy) A Abbagnato	1	3
3	(Switzerland) S Waltert	1	0
(Serbia) L Radivojević	6	6

Semifinals
(Slovenia) T Zidanšek	6	5	2
(Serbia) L Radivojević	4	7	6

=== Bottom half ===
First round
5	(United States) B Pera	1	2
(Canada) C Branstine	6	6
(Italy) N Brancaccio	5	6	6
(Czech Republic) B Palicová	7	0	1
WC	(Italy) M Trevisan	6^{2}	4
(Spain) A Bolsova	7^{7}	6
(Georgia (country)) E Gorgodze	1	1
4	(Czech Republic) S Bejlek	6	6
7	O Selekhmeteva	6	6
(Ukraine) O Oliynykova	3	3
(Germany) M Barthel	3	2
Q	(Serbia) T Kostović	6	6
(Poland) M Chwalińska	6	6
(Italy) S Ambrosio	2	4
(Spain) G Maristany	6^{1}	1
2	(Latvia) D Semeņistaja	7^{7}	6

Second round
(Canada) C Branstine	6^{2}	5
(Italy) N Brancaccio	7^{7}	7
(Spain) A Bolsova	4	3
4	(Czech Republic) S Bejlek	6	6
7	O Selekhmeteva	6^{5}	6	6
Q	(Serbia) T Kostović	7^{7}	2	4
(Poland) M Chwalińska	6	6
2	(Latvia) D Semeņistaja	0	4

Quarterfinals
(Italy) N Brancaccio	4	6	3
4	(Czech Republic) S Bejlek	6	4	6
7	O Selekhmeteva	3	4
(Poland) M Chwalińska	6	6

Semifinals
4	(Czech Republic) S Bejlek	6	6
(Poland) M Chwalińska	3	2

== Qualifying ==
=== Seeds ===
1. (Serbia) Teodora Kostović (qualified)
2. (Switzerland) Leonie Küng (qualifying competition, lucky loser)
3. (Australia) Tina Smith (qualifying competition)
4. (Finland) Laura Hietaranta (first round)
5. (Italy) Dalila Spiteri (first round)
6. (France) Tiphanie Lemaître (qualified)
7. Ekaterina Kazionova (first round)
8. (Italy) Federica Urgesi (qualifying competition)

=== Qualifiers ===
1. (Serbia) Teodora Kostović
2. (France) Tiphanie Lemaître
3. (Italy) Deborah Chiesa
4. (Italy) Anastasia Abbagnato

=== Lucky loser ===
1. (Switzerland) Leonie Küng

=== Qualifying draw ===
==== First qualifier ====
First round
1	(Serbia) Teodora Kostović	6	6
(Germany) Tayisiya Morderger	3	1
(Italy) Martina Colmegna	1	4
8	(Italy) Federica Urgesi	6	6

Qualifying competition
1	(Serbia) Teodora Kostović	7	6
8	(Italy) Federica Urgesi	5	2

==== Second qualifier ====
First round
2	(Switzerland) Leonie Küng	6	6
(Germany) Yana Morderger	4	2
(United Kingdom) Freya Christie	5	2
6	(France) Tiphanie Lemaître	7	6

Qualifying competition
2	(Switzerland) Leonie Küng	2	1
6	(France) Tiphanie Lemaître	6	6

==== Third qualifier ====
First round
3	(Australia) Tina Smith	6	6
Amina Anshba	4	1
(Italy) Deborah Chiesa	4	6	7
7	Ekaterina Kazionova	6	2	5

Qualifying competition
3	(Australia) Tina Smith	6	4	3
(Italy) Deborah Chiesa	3	6	6

==== Fourth qualifier ====
First round
4	(Finland) Laura Hietaranta	6^{2}	3
(Italy) Anastasia Abbagnato	7^{7}	6
WC	(Italy) Sofia Rocchetti	7	3	6
5	(Italy) Dalila Spiteri	5	6	4

Qualifying competition
(Italy) Anastasia Abbagnato	6	5	7^{7}
WC	(Italy) Sofia Rocchetti	3	7	6^{4}
