= 2023 Internazionali Femminili di Tennis Città di Caserta =

Tennis tournament

- Date: 5–11 June 2023
- Edition: 34th
- Category: ITF Women's World Tennis Tour
- Prize money: $60,000
- Surface: Clay / Outdoor
- Location: Caserta, Italy

Champions

Singles
- (United States) Hailey Baptiste

Doubles
- Anastasia Tikhonova / (Japan) Moyuka Uchijima
← 2022 ·	Internazionali Femminili di Tennis Città di Caserta	· 2024 →

The 2023 Internazionali Femminili di Tennis Città di Caserta was a professional tennis tournament played on outdoor clay courts. It was the thirty-fourth edition of the tournament, which was part of the 2023 ITF Women's World Tennis Tour. It took place in Caserta, Italy, between 5 and 11 June 2023.

== Champions ==
=== Singles ===
- (United States) Hailey Baptiste def. (Cyprus) Raluca Șerban, 6–3, 6–2

=== Doubles ===
- Anastasia Tikhonova / (Japan) Moyuka Uchijima def. (Greece) Despina Papamichail / (Italy) Camilla Rosatello, 6–4, 6–2

== Singles main draw entrants ==
=== Seeds ===
Country	Player	Rank	Seed
EST	Kaia Kanepi	74	1
JPN	Moyuka Uchijima	145	2
GRE	Despina Papamichail	158	3
ITA	Nuria Brancaccio	175	4
FRA	Séléna Janicijevic	179	5
CYP	Raluca Șerban	194	6
USA	Katrina Scott	195	7
GER	Noma Noha Akugue	224	8

- Rankings are as of 29 May 2023.

=== Other entrants ===
The following players received wildcards into the singles main draw:

- (Italy) Antonia Aragosa
- (Italy) Deborah Chiesa
- (Italy) Georgia Pedone
- (Italy) Beatrice Ricci

The following players received entry from the qualifying draw:

- (Germany) Silvia Ambrosio
- (Brazil) Gabriela Cé
- (Estonia) Elena Malõgina
- (Italy) Lisa Pigato
- (Italy) Anastasia Piangerelli
- (Italy) Jennifer Ruggeri
- (Italy) Dalila Spiteri
- (United States) Vivian Wolff

The following player received entry as a lucky loser:

- (United States) Christina Rosca
