= 2025 Internazionali di Calabria =

Tennis tournament

- Date: 29 September–5 October 2025
- Edition: 1st
- Category: WTA 125
- Prize money: $115,000
- Surface: Clay
- Location: Rende, Italy

Champions

Singles
- (Czech Republic) Sára Bejlek

Doubles
- (Italy) Nicole Fossa Huergo / (Georgia (country)) Ekaterine Gorgodze
- Internazionali di Calabria

The 2025 Internazionali di Calabria was a professional tennis tournament played on outdoor clay courts. It was the first edition of the tournament and part of the 2025 WTA 125 tournaments. It took place in Rende, Italy between 29 September and 5 October 2025.

== Singles main-draw entrants ==
=== Seeds ===
Country	Player	Rank^{1}	Seed
EGY	Mayar Sherif	100	1
LAT	Darja Semeņistaja	104	2
SUI	Simona Waltert	116	3
CZE	Sára Bejlek	117	4
USA	Bernarda Pera	120	5
AUT	Julia Grabher	121	6
	Oksana Selekhmeteva	125	7
ESP	Leyre Romero Gormaz	132	8

- ^{1} Rankings are as of 22 September 2025.

=== Other entrants ===
The following players received wildcards into the singles main draw:

- (Italy) Nicole Fossa Huergo
- (Italy) Tatiana Pieri
- (Italy) Martina Trevisan
- (Italy) Aurora Zantedeschi

The following player received entry using a protected ranking:

- ~~(Argentina) Paula Ormaechea~~

The following players received entry from the qualifying draw:

- (Italy) Anastasia Abbagnato
- (Italy) Deborah Chiesa
- (Serbia) Teodora Kostović
- (France) Tiphanie Lemaître

The following player received entry as a lucky loser:

- (Switzerland) Leonie Küng

=== Withdrawals ===
- (Argentina) Paula Ormaechea → replaced by (Switzerland) Leonie Küng

== Doubles entrants ==
=== Seeds ===
Country	Player	Country	Player	Rank	Seed
CZE	Jesika Malečková	CZE	Miriam Škoch	162	1
ITA	Angelica Moratelli	LAT	Darja Semeņistaja	236	2
	Amina Anshba	GBR	Madeleine Brooks	256	2
GBR	Alicia Barnett	FRA	Elixane Lechemia	258	4

- Rankings as of 22 September 2025.

=== Other entrants ===
The following pair received a wildcard into the doubles main draw:

- (Italy) Tatiana Pieri / (Italy) Dalila Spiteri

== Champions ==
=== Singles ===
- (Czech Republic) Sára Bejlek def. (Serbia) Lola Radivojević 6–2, 6–7^{(1–7)}, 6–3

=== Doubles ===
- (Italy) Nicole Fossa Huergo / (Georgia (country)) Ekaterine Gorgodze def. (Italy) Federica Urgesi / (Italy) Aurora Zantedeschi 3–6, 6–1, [10–4]
