= 2023 Internazionali Femminili di Tennis Città di Caserta – Doubles =

Doubles
- 2023 Internazionali Femminili di Tennis Città di Caserta

Final
- Champions: Anastasia Tikhonova (Japan) Moyuka Uchijima
- Runners-up: (Greece) Despina Papamichail (Italy) Camilla Rosatello
- Score: 6–4, 6–2

Events
Singles	Doubles
← 2022 ·	Internazionali Femminili di Tennis Città di Caserta	· 2024 →

Despina Papamichail and Camilla Rosatello were the defending champions but lost in the final to Anastasia Tikhonova and Moyuka Uchijima, 4–6, 2–6.

== Seeds ==
1. (Greece) Despina Papamichail / (Italy) Camilla Rosatello (final)
2. Anastasia Tikhonova / (Japan) Moyuka Uchijima (champions)
3. (Indonesia) Jessy Rompies / (India) Prarthana Thombare (semifinals)
4. (Romania) Oana Gavrilă / (Netherlands) Isabelle Haverlag (quarterfinals)

== Draw ==
=== Key ===
- Q = Qualifier
- WC = Wild card
- LL = Lucky loser
- Alt = Alternate
- SE = Special exempt
- PR = Protected ranking
- ITF = ITF entry
- JE = Junior exempt
- w/o = Walkover
- r = Retired
- d = Defaulted
- SR = Special ranking

First round
(Brazil) A Candiotto (Brazil) R Pereira	6^{4}	0
(United States) C Rosca (Australia) A Sharma	7^{7}	6
3	(Indonesia) J Rompies (India) P Thombare	6	6
A Kovaleva; K Zaytseva	4	4
(Serbia) T Čurović (Estonia) E Malõgina	6	6
(United States) A Reami (Germany) S-R Sekulic	4	4
(Italy) B Ricci (Italy) D Valente	4	2
(Italy) N Brancaccio (Burundi) S Nahimana	6	6
(Italy) A Abbagnato (Italy) J Ruggeri	4	7^{7}	[8]
4	(Romania) O Gavrilă (Netherlands) I Haverlag	6	6^{3}	[10]
(Italy) C Catini (Italy) A Piangerelli	2	4
(Italy) E Alvisi (Italy) G Pedone	6	6
(United States) H Baptiste (United States) K Scott	5	6	[2]
2	A Tikhonova (Japan) M Uchijima	7	3	[10]

Quarterfinals
1	(Greece) D Papamichail (Italy) C Rosatello	6	6
(United States) C Rosca (Australia) A Sharma	3	1
3	(Indonesia) J Rompies (India) P Thombare	6	6
(Serbia) T Čurović (Estonia) E Malõgina	4	3
(Italy) N Brancaccio (Burundi) S Nahimana	6	6^{4}	[12]
4	(Romania) O Gavrilă (Netherlands) I Haverlag	3	7^{7}	[10]
(Italy) E Alvisi (Italy) G Pedone	2	5
2	A Tikhonova (Japan) M Uchijima	6	7

Semifinals
1	(Greece) D Papamichail (Italy) C Rosatello	5	7^{11}	[12]
3	(Indonesia) J Rompies (India) P Thombare	7	6^{9}	[10]
(Italy) N Brancaccio (Burundi) S Nahimana	2	3
2	A Tikhonova (Japan) M Uchijima	6	6

Final
1	(Greece) D Papamichail (Italy) C Rosatello	4	2
2	A Tikhonova (Japan) M Uchijima	6	6
