= 2025 Internazionali di Calabria – Doubles =

Doubles
- 2025 Internazionali di Calabria

Final
- Champions: (Italy) Nicole Fossa Huergo (Georgia (country)) Ekaterine Gorgodze
- Runners-up: (Italy) Federica Urgesi (Italy) Aurora Zantedeschi
- Score: 3–6, 6–1, [10–4]

Events
Singles	Doubles
Internazionali di Calabria	· 2026 →

This was the first edition of the tournament.

Nicole Fossa Huergo and Ekaterine Gorgodze won the title, defeating Federica Urgesi and Aurora Zantedeschi 3–6, 6–1, [10–4] in the final.

== Seeds ==
1. (Czech Republic) Jesika Malečková / (Czech Republic) Miriam Škoch (quarterfinals)
2. (Italy) Angelica Moratelli / (Latvia) Darja Semeņistaja (first round)
3. Amina Anshba / (United Kingdom) Madeleine Brooks (semifinals)
4. (United Kingdom) Alicia Barnett / (France) Elixane Lechemia (first round)

== Draw ==
=== Key ===
- Q = Qualifier
- WC = Wild card
- LL = Lucky loser
- Alt = Alternate
- ITF = ITF entry
- PR = Protected ranking
- SR = Special ranking
- SE = Special exempt
- JE = Junior exempt
- JR = Junior Accelerator Programme entrant
- CO = College Accelerator Programme entrant
- NG = Next Gen Accelerator Program entrant
- w/o = Walkover
- r = Retired
- d = Defaulted

=== Draw ===
First round
1	(Czech Republic) J Malečková (Czech Republic) M Škoch	6	4	[10]
(Italy) A Abbagnato (Spain) Y Cavallé Reimers	1	6	[5]
(Italy) N Fossa Huergo (Georgia (country)) E Gorgodze	6	6
O Selekhmeteva (Switzerland) S Waltert	4	4
4	(United Kingdom) A Barnett (France) E Lechemia	6^{3}	6^{3}
(Spain) A Bolsova (Spain) G Maristany	7^{7}	7^{7}
(Algeria) I Ibbou (India) V Shinde	3	7	[3]
(United Kingdom) S Anane; E Kazionova	6	5	[10]
Alt	(Switzerland) L Küng (France) T Lemaître	6	6
(United Kingdom) F Christie (Bosnia and Herzegovina) A Wagner	1	4
WC	(Italy) T Pieri (Italy) D Spiteri	2	5
3	A Anshba (United Kingdom) M Brooks	6	7
(United States) A Zamarripa (United States) M Zamarripa	6	6
(Germany) T Morderger (Germany) Y Morderger	3	1
(Italy) F Urgesi (Italy) A Zantedeschi	3	6	[10]
2	(Italy) A Moratelli (Latvia) D Semeņistaja	6	2	[5]

Quarterfinals
1	(Czech Republic) J Malečková (Czech Republic) M Škoch	4	6	[7]
(Italy) N Fossa Huergo (Georgia (country)) E Gorgodze	6	3	[10]
(Spain) A Bolsova (Spain) G Maristany	6	6
(United Kingdom) S Anane; E Kazionova	2	2
Alt	(Switzerland) L Küng (France) T Lemaître	4	6^{3}
3	A Anshba (United Kingdom) M Brooks	6	7^{7}
(United States) A Zamarripa (United States) M Zamarripa	4	0
(Italy) F Urgesi (Italy) A Zantedeschi	6	6

Semifinals
(Italy) N Fossa Huergo (Georgia (country)) E Gorgodze	6	6
(Spain) A Bolsova (Spain) G Maristany	3	4
3	A Anshba (United Kingdom) M Brooks	4	4
(Italy) F Urgesi (Italy) A Zantedeschi	6	6

Final
(Italy) N Fossa Huergo (Georgia (country)) E Gorgodze	3	6	[10]
(Italy) F Urgesi (Italy) A Zantedeschi	6	1	[4]
