= 2024 Internazionali Femminili di Tennis Città di Caserta – Singles =

Singles
- 2024 Internazionali Femminili di Tennis Città di Caserta

Final
- Champion: (Spain) Leyre Romero Gormaz
- Runner-up: (Switzerland) Jil Teichmann
- Score: 6–2, 4–6, 6–4

Events
Singles	Doubles
← 2023 ·	Internazionali Femminili di Tennis Città di Caserta	· 2025 →

Hailey Baptiste was the defending champion but chose not to participate.

Leyre Romero Gormaz won the title, defeating Jil Teichmann in the final, 6–2, 4–6, 6–4.

== Seeds ==
1. (Brazil) Laura Pigossi (semifinals)
2. (France) Carole Monnet (first round)
3. (Australia) Priscilla Hon (second round)
4. (Switzerland) Jil Teichmann (final)
5. (Spain) Leyre Romero Gormaz (champion)
6. (Romania) Andreea Mitu (second round)
7. (Greece) Despina Papamichail (second round)
8. (France) Séléna Janicijevic (second round)

== Draw ==
=== Key ===
- Q = Qualifier
- WC = Wild card
- LL = Lucky loser
- Alt = Alternate
- SE = Special exempt
- PR = Protected ranking
- ITF = ITF entry
- JE = Junior exempt
- w/o = Walkover
- r = Retired
- d = Defaulted
- SR = Special ranking

=== Finals ===
Semifinals
1	(Brazil) Laura Pigossi	2	2
5	(Spain) Leyre Romero Gormaz	6	6
4	(Switzerland) Jil Teichmann	1	7^{7}	7^{7}
(Japan) Sara Saito	6	6^{5}	6^{3}

Final
5	(Spain) Leyre Romero Gormaz	6	4	6
4	(Switzerland) Jil Teichmann	2	6	4

=== Top half ===
First round
1	(Brazil) L Pigossi	1	6	6
E Pridankina	6	3	2
Q	(Italy) G Squarcialupi	6	6
LL	(Romania) M Toma	2	0
WC	(Italy) A Abbagnato	6	7^{11}
Q	(Italy) A Raggi	4	6^{9}
(Italy) L Pigato	6^{5}	6^{7}
8	(France) S Janicijevic	7^{7}	7^{9}
3	(Australia) P Hon	6	6
(Australia) S Mendez	2	3
(Italy) T Pieri	6	6
WC	(Italy) J Ruggeri	3	4
Q	V Kan	2	0
Q	(Italy) N Fossa Huergo	6	6
E Maklakova	1	3
5	(Spain) L Romero Gormaz	6	6

Second round
1	(Brazil) L Pigossi	6	6
Q	(Italy) G Squarcialupi	2	1
WC	(Italy) A Abbagnato	6^{5}	6	6
8	(France) S Janicijevic	7^{7}	3	1
3	(Australia) P Hon	3	6	1
(Italy) T Pieri	6	2	6
Q	(Italy) N Fossa Huergo	2	3
5	(Spain) L Romero Gormaz	6	6

Quarterfinals
1	(Brazil) L Pigossi	7^{7}	6
WC	(Italy) A Abbagnato	6^{2}	0
(Italy) T Pieri	6	4	5
5	(Spain) L Romero Gormaz	2	6	7

Semifinals
1	(Brazil) L Pigossi	2	2
5	(Spain) L Romero Gormaz	6	6

=== Bottom half ===
First round
7	(Greece) D Papamichail	6	6
(Italy) D Spiteri	4	1
Q	(Colombia) Y Lizarazo	6	4	3
(France) A Hesse	3	6	6
Q	A Zyryanova	0	3
(Italy) D Chiesa	6	6
WC	(Italy) A Aragosa	2	0
4	(Switzerland) J Teichmann	6	6
6	(Romania) A Mitu	7^{7}	3	6
(Hungary) T Babos	6^{2}	6	2
WC	(Italy) S Rocchetti	5	2
(Greece) M Matoula	7	6
Q	(Italy) F Di Sarra	7	6
Q	(Italy) D Cherubini	5	4
(Japan) S Saito	6	5	6
2	(France) C Monnet	2	7	3

Second round
7	(Greece) D Papamichail	2	0
(France) A Hesse	6	6
(Italy) D Chiesa	6	4	0
4	(Switzerland) J Teichmann	3	6	6
6	(Romania) A Mitu	3	3
(Greece) M Matoula	6	6
Q	(Italy) F Di Sarra	1	0
(Japan) S Saito	6	6

Quarterfinals
(France) A Hesse	6	2	0
4	(Switzerland) J Teichmann	4	6	6
(Greece) M Matoula	6	6^{5}	2
(Japan) S Saito	4	7^{7}	6

Semifinals
4	(Switzerland) J Teichmann	1	7^{7}	7^{7}
(Japan) S Saito	6	6^{5}	6^{3}
