= 2026 Internazionali Femminili di Tennis Città di Caserta =

Tennis tournament

- Date: 1–7 June 2026
- Edition: 37th
- Category: ITF Women's World Tennis Tour
- Prize money: $60,000
- Surface: Clay / Outdoor
- Location: Caserta, Italy

Champions

Singles
- (Italy) Federica Urgesi

Doubles
- (United Kingdom) Freya Christie / (United Kingdom) Eden Silva
- Internazionali Femminili di Tennis Città di Caserta

The 2026 Internazionali Femminili di Tennis Città di Caserta was a professional tennis tournament played on outdoor clay courts. It was the thirty-seventh edition of the tournament, which was part of the 2026 ITF Women's World Tennis Tour. It took place in Caserta, Italy, between 1 and 7 June 2026.

== Champions ==
=== Singles ===
- (Italy) Federica Urgesi def. (Italy) Alessandra Mazzola, 6–4, 3–6, 6–1.

=== Doubles ===
- (United Kingdom) Freya Christie / (United Kingdom) Eden Silva def. (Spain) Yvonne Cavallé Reimers / (Brazil) Laura Pigossi, 3–6, 6–4, [10–4].

== Singles main draw entrants ==
=== Seeds ===
Country	Player	Rank	Seed
ARG	Jazmín Ortenzi	168	1
ARG	Luisina Giovannini	190	2
FRA	Alice Ramé	200	3
BRA	Laura Pigossi	227	4
LIE	Kathinka von Deichmann	240	5
USA	Vivian Wolff	249	6
ITA	Jessica Pieri	258	7
GER	Tessa Johanna Brockmann	273	8

- Rankings are as of 25 May 2026.

=== Other entrants ===
The following players received wildcards into the singles main draw:

- (Italy) Noemi Basiletti
- (Italy) Federica Sacco
- (Italy) Martina Trevisan
- (Italy) Federica Urgesi

The following players received entry from the qualifying draw:

- (Italy) Deborah Chiesa
- (Germany) Mina Hodzic
- (Italy) Marta Lombardini
- (Italy) Alessandra Mazzola
- (Italy) Angelica Raggi
- (Italy) Beatrice Ricci
- (Germany) Emily Seibold
- (Italy) Isabella Maria Șerban

The following players received entry as a lucky losers:

- (Italy) Martina Colmegna
- (Australia) Gabriella Da Silva-Fick
