= 2023 Internazionali Femminili di Tennis Città di Caserta – Singles =

Singles
- 2023 Internazionali Femminili di Tennis Città di Caserta

Final
- Champion: (United States) Hailey Baptiste
- Runner-up: (Cyprus) Raluca Șerban
- Score: 6–3, 6–2

Events
Singles	Doubles
← 2022 ·	Internazionali Femminili di Tennis Città di Caserta	· 2024 →

Kristina Mladenovic was the defending champion but chose not to participate.

Hailey Baptiste won the title, defeating Raluca Șerban in the final, 6–3, 6–2.

== Seeds ==
1. (Estonia) Kaia Kanepi (second round, retired)
2. (Japan) Moyuka Uchijima (second round)
3. (Greece) Despina Papamichail (first round)
4. (Italy) Nuria Brancaccio (second round)
5. (France) Séléna Janicijevic (first round)
6. (Cyprus) Raluca Șerban (final)
7. (United States) Katrina Scott (second round)
8. (Germany) Noma Noha Akugue (second round)

== Draw ==
=== Key ===
- Q = Qualifier
- WC = Wild card
- LL = Lucky loser
- Alt = Alternate
- SE = Special exempt
- PR = Protected ranking
- ITF = ITF entry
- JE = Junior exempt
- w/o = Walkover
- r = Retired
- d = Defaulted
- SR = Special ranking

=== Finals ===
Semifinals
(Italy) Camilla Rosatello	3	2
6	(Cyprus) Raluca Șerban	6	6
(United States) Hailey Baptiste	6	7
Anastasia Tikhonova	4	5

Final
6	(Cyprus) Raluca Șerban	3	2
(United States) Hailey Baptiste	6	6

=== Top half ===
First round
1	(Estonia) K Kanepi	6	6
(Japan) M Doi	0	3
WC	(Italy) A Aragosa	4	4
WC	(Italy) G Pedone	6	6
(Burundi) S Nahimana	2	4
(Italy) C Rosatello	6	6
(United States) F Di Lorenzo	2	0
7	(United States) K Scott	6	6
3	(Greece) D Papamichail	2	3
Q	(United States) V Wolff	6	6
LL	(United States) C Rosca	6	0	0
Q	(Brazil) G Cé	2	6	6
Q	(Italy) A Piangerelli	5	2
WC	(Italy) B Ricci	7	6
Q	(Germany) S Ambrosio	5	3
6	(Cyprus) R Șerban	7	6

Second round
1	(Estonia) K Kanepi	5	0^{r}
WC	(Italy) G Pedone	7	0
(Italy) C Rosatello	6	6
7	(United States) K Scott	3	3
Q	(United States) V Wolff	6	4	6^{5}
Q	(Brazil) G Cé	4	6	7^{7}
WC	(Italy) B Ricci	2	2
6	(Cyprus) R Șerban	6	6

Quarterfinals
WC	(Italy) G Pedone	6^{3}	4
(Italy) C Rosatello	7^{7}	6
Q	(Brazil) G Cé	2	2
6	(Cyprus) R Șerban	6	6

Semifinals
(Italy) C Rosatello	3	2
6	(Cyprus) R Șerban	6	6

=== Bottom half ===
First round
5	(France) S Janicijevic	6^{3}	0
(United States) H Baptiste	7^{7}	6
(France) A Albié	6	7^{7}
(France) M Rouvroy	0	6^{4}
Q	(Estonia) E Malõgina	6	6
Q	(Italy) L Pigato	4	3
(Australia) A Sharma	4	3
4	(Italy) N Brancaccio	6	6
8	(Germany) N Noha Akugue	6	6
Q	(Italy) J Ruggeri	2	4
(United States) L Chirico	6	6
WC	(Italy) D Chiesa	4	3
A Tikhonova	6	6
(United States) W Osuigwe	2	2
Q	(Italy) D Spiteri	3	3
2	(Japan) M Uchijima	6	6

Second round
(United States) H Baptiste	7	7
(France) A Albié	5	5
Q	(Estonia) E Malõgina	6	6
4	(Italy) N Brancaccio	3	2
8	(Germany) N Noha Akugue	1	4
(United States) L Chirico	6	6
A Tikhonova	6	6
2	(Japan) M Uchijima	3	2

Quarterfinals
(United States) H Baptiste	6	6
Q	(Estonia) E Malõgina	2	1
(United States) L Chirico	1	2
A Tikhonova	6	6

Semifinals
(United States) H Baptiste	6	7
A Tikhonova	4	5
