= 2026 Internazionali Femminili di Tennis Città di Caserta – Doubles =

Doubles
- 2026 Internazionali Femminili di Tennis Città di Caserta

Final
- Champions: (United Kingdom) Freya Christie (United Kingdom) Eden Silva
- Runners-up: (Spain) Yvonne Cavallé Reimers (Brazil) Laura Pigossi
- Score: 3–6, 6–4, [10–4]

Events
Singles	Doubles
- Internazionali Femminili di Tennis Città di Caserta

Cho I-hsuan and Cho Yi-tsen were the defending champions but chose to compete in Foggia instead.

Freya Christie and Eden Silva won the title, defeating Yvonne Cavallé Reimers and Laura Pigossi 3–6, 6–4, [10–4] in the final.

== Seeds ==
1. (Ukraine) Valeriya Strakhova / Anastasia Tikhonova (quarterfinals)
2. (Spain) Yvonne Cavallé Reimers / (Brazil) Laura Pigossi (final)
3. (Australia) Gabriella Da Silva-Fick / (Australia) Tenika McGiffin (quarterfinals)
4. (Italy) Angelica Moratelli / (Italy) Aurora Zantedeschi (first round)

== Draw ==
Key

- Q = Qualifier
- WC = Wild card
- LL = Lucky loser
- Alt = Alternate
- ITF = ITF entry
- PR = Protected ranking
- SR = Special ranking
- SE = Special exempt
- JE = Junior exempt
- JR = Junior Accelerator Programme entrant
- CO = College Accelerator Programme entrant
- NG = Next Gen Accelerator Program entrant
- w/o = Walkover
- r = Retired
- d = Defaulted

First round
(Belgium) P Bakhmutkina (Germany) M Hodzic	3	2
(United Kingdom) F Christie (United Kingdom) E Silva	6	6
3	(Australia) G Da Silva-Fick (Australia) T McGiffin	6	6
WC	(Italy) G Mais (Italy) Y Zocco	0	1
(Italy) D Chiesa (Italy) M Colmegna	7^{7}	6
WC	(Italy) C Gennaro (Italy) M Lombardini	6^{4}	3
(Italy) S Rocchetti (Italy) IM Șerban	2	1
(Romania) O Gavrilă (Hungary) A Nagy	6	6
(Italy) F Sacco (Bulgaria) I Shinikova	6	4	[10]
4	(Italy) A Moratelli (Italy) A Zantedeschi	3	6	[7]
(United States) J Daniel (India) P Thombare	7	7^{7}
(Italy) N Basiletti (Italy) F Urgesi	5	6^{4}
(Italy) J Pieri (Italy) A Raggi
2	(Spain) Y Cavallé Reimers (Brazil) L Pigossi	w/o

Quarterfinals
1	(Ukraine) V Strakhova; A Tikhonova	2	4
(United Kingdom) F Christie (United Kingdom) E Silva	6	6
3	(Australia) G Da Silva-Fick (Australia) T McGiffin	2	5
(Italy) D Chiesa (Italy) M Colmegna	6	7
(Romania) O Gavrilă (Hungary) A Nagy	6	6
(Italy) F Sacco (Bulgaria) I Shinikova	0	2
(United States) J Daniel (India) P Thombare	4	0
2	(Spain) Y Cavallé Reimers (Brazil) L Pigossi	6	6

Semifinals
(United Kingdom) F Christie (United Kingdom) E Silva	7	6
(Italy) D Chiesa (Italy) M Colmegna	5	3
(Romania) O Gavrilă (Hungary) A Nagy	4	3
2	(Spain) Y Cavallé Reimers (Brazil) L Pigossi	6	6

Final
(United Kingdom) F Christie (United Kingdom) E Silva	3	6	[10]
2	(Spain) Y Cavallé Reimers (Brazil) L Pigossi	6	4	[4]
