= 2024 Internazionali Femminili di Tennis Città di Caserta – Doubles =

Doubles
- 2024 Internazionali Femminili di Tennis Città di Caserta

Final
- Champions: (Colombia) Yuliana Lizarazo (Greece) Despina Papamichail
- Runners-up: (United Kingdom) Ali Collins (Colombia) María Paulina Pérez
- Score: 4–6, 6–3, [10–3]

Events
Singles	Doubles
← 2023 ·	Internazionali Femminili di Tennis Città di Caserta	· 2025 →

Anastasia Tikhonova and Moyuka Uchijima were the defending champions but chose not to participate.

Yuliana Lizarazo and Despina Papamichail won the title, defeating Ali Collins and María Paulina Pérez in the final, 4–6, 6–3, [10–3].

== Seeds ==
1. (Colombia) Yuliana Lizarazo / (Greece) Despina Papamichail (champions)
2. (United Kingdom) Ali Collins / (Colombia) María Paulina Pérez (final)
3. (Italy) Nicole Fossa Huergo / (Bosnia and Herzegovina) Anita Wagner (semifinals)
4. (China) Feng Shuo / (Australia) Alexandra Osborne (semifinals)

== Draw ==
=== Key ===
- Q = Qualifier
- WC = Wild card
- LL = Lucky loser
- Alt = Alternate
- SE = Special exempt
- PR = Protected ranking
- ITF = ITF entry
- JE = Junior exempt
- w/o = Walkover
- r = Retired
- d = Defaulted
- SR = Special ranking

First round
(Italy) A Abbagnato (Italy) L Pigato	6	6
(Greece) M Matoula (United States) G Vilar	4	2

Quarterfinals
1	(Colombia) Y Lizarazo (Greece) D Papamichail	w/o
(Italy) A Abbagnato (Italy) L Pigato
3	(Italy) N Fossa Huergo (Bosnia and Herzegovina) A Wagner	6	6
(France) C Monnet (Italy) D Spiteri	4	1
(Italy) C Gennaro (Italy) J Ruggeri	6^{3}	3
4	(China) S Feng (Australia) A Osborne	7^{7}	6
E Maklakova; E Pridankina	5	6	[5]
2	(United Kingdom) A Collins (Colombia) MP Pérez	7	2	[10]

Semifinals
1	(Colombia) Y Lizarazo (Greece) D Papamichail	6	7
3	(Italy) N Fossa Huergo (Bosnia and Herzegovina) A Wagner	2	5
4	(China) S Feng (Australia) A Osborne	6	2	[6]
2	(United Kingdom) A Collins (Colombia) MP Pérez	1	6	[10]

Final
1	(Colombia) Y Lizarazo (Greece) D Papamichail	4	6	[10]
2	(United Kingdom) A Collins (Colombia) MP Pérez	6	3	[3]
