= 2026 Internazionali Femminili di Tennis Città di Caserta – Singles =

Singles
- 2026 Internazionali Femminili di Tennis Città di Caserta

Final
- Champion: (Italy) Federica Urgesi
- Runner-up: (Italy) Alessandra Mazzola
- Score: 6–4, 3–6, 6–1

Events
Singles	Doubles
- Internazionali Femminili di Tennis Città di Caserta

Andrea Lázaro García was the defending champion, but chose to compete in Makarska instead.

Federica Urgesi won the title, defeating Alessandra Mazzola 6–4, 3–6, 6–1 in the final.

== Seeds ==
1. (Argentina) Jazmín Ortenzi (second round)
2. (Argentina) Luisina Giovannini (first round)
3. (France) Alice Ramé (second round)
4. (Brazil) Laura Pigossi (quarterfinals)
5. (Liechtenstein) Kathinka von Deichmann (first round)
6. (United States) Vivian Wolff (first round)
7. (Italy) Jessica Pieri (first round)
8. (Germany) Tessa Brockmann (first round)

== Draw ==
Key

- Q = Qualifier
- WC = Wild card
- LL = Lucky loser
- Alt = Alternate
- ITF = ITF entry
- PR = Protected ranking
- SR = Special ranking
- SE = Special exempt
- JE = Junior exempt
- JR = Junior Accelerator Programme entrant
- CO = College Accelerator Programme entrant
- NG = Next Gen Accelerator Program entrant
- w/o = Walkover
- r = Retired
- d = Defaulted

=== Finals ===
Semifinals
WC	(Italy) Federica Urgesi	6	6
Q	(Italy) Deborah Chiesa	4	2
(Germany) Nastasja Schunk	2	3
Q	(Italy) Alessandra Mazzola	6	6

Final
WC	(Italy) Federica Urgesi	6	3	6
Q	(Italy) Alessandra Mazzola	4	6	1

=== Top half ===
First round
1	(Argentina) J Ortenzi	6	6
Q	(Italy) B Ricci	2	2
Q	(Italy) M Lombardini	6	6
WC	(Italy) F Sacco	3	4
WC	(Italy) N Basiletti	4	7^{7}	2
(Brazil) G Cé	6	6^{4}	6
WC	(Italy) F Urgesi	6	6^{6}	6
6	(United States) V Wolff	4	7^{8}	2
4	(Brazil) L Pigossi	6	6
LL	(Australia) G Da Silva-Fick	2	1
(Bulgaria) I Shinikova	3	6^{3}
A Tikhonova	6	7^{7}
WC	(Italy) M Trevisan	6	4	7
(Romania) ER Bertea	1	6	5
Q	(Italy) D Chiesa	7^{7}	6
7	(Italy) J Pieri	6^{4}	3

Second round
1	(Argentina) J Ortenzi	4	2
Q	(Italy) M Lombardini	6	6
(Brazil) G Cé	0	6	3
WC	(Italy) F Urgesi	6	3	6
4	(Brazil) L Pigossi	6	6
A Tikhonova	1	2
WC	(Italy) M Trevisan	2	4
Q	(Italy) D Chiesa	6	6

Quarterfinals
Q	(Italy) M Lombardini	0	2
WC	(Italy) F Urgesi	6	6
4	(Brazil) L Pigossi	1	0
Q	(Italy) D Chiesa	6	6

Semifinals
WC	(Italy) F Urgesi	6	6
Q	(Italy) D Chiesa	4	2

=== Bottom half ===
First round
8	(Germany) T Brockmann	7	3	4
(Germany) N Schunk	5	6	6
Q	(Italy) IM Șerban	1	2
Q	(Germany) M Hodzic	6	6
(Italy) D Cherubini	6	1	7^{7}
(United States) A Akli	1	6	6^{2}
Q	(Germany) E Seibold	2	4
3	(France) A Ramé	6	6
5	(Liechtenstein) K von Deichmann	6^{3}	0
Q	(Italy) A Mazzola	7^{7}	6
LL	(Italy) M Colmegna	2	1
(Italy) A Zantedeschi	6	6
Q	(Italy) A Raggi	1	3
(Italy) D Spiteri	6	6
(Italy) F Pace	7^{7}	6
2	(Argentina) L Giovannini	6^{5}	2

Second round
(Germany) N Schunk	6	6
Q	(Germany) M Hodzic	4	4
(Italy) D Cherubini	6	6
3	(France) A Ramé	2	3
Q	(Italy) A Mazzola	3	7^{7}	6
(Italy) A Zantedeschi	6	6^{3}	2
(Italy) D Spiteri	6	3
(Italy) F Pace	2	1^{r}

Quarterfinals
(Germany) N Schunk	6	6
(Italy) D Cherubini	4	3
Q	(Italy) A Mazzola	6	6
(Italy) D Spiteri	4	4

Semifinals
(Germany) N Schunk	2	3
Q	(Italy) A Mazzola	6	6
