= 2022 Internazionali Femminili di Tennis Città di Caserta – Singles =

Singles
- 2022 Internazionali Femminili di Tennis Città di Caserta

Final
- Champion: (France) Kristina Mladenovic
- Runner-up: (Italy) Camilla Rosatello
- Score: 6–4, 4–6, 7–6^{(7–3)}

Events
Singles	Doubles
← 2019 ·	Internazionali Femminili di Tennis Città di Caserta	· 2023 →

Varvara Gracheva was the defending champion but chose not to participate.

Kristina Mladenovic won the title, defeating Camilla Rosatello in the final, 6–4, 4–6, 7–6^{(7–3)}.

== Seeds ==
1. (France) Clara Burel (first round)
2. (France) Kristina Mladenovic (champion)
3. Elina Avanesyan (second round)
4. (Greece) Despina Papamichail (first round)
5. (Japan) Moyuka Uchijima (semifinals)
6. (Switzerland) Simona Waltert (first round)
7. (Italy) Federica Di Sarra (quarterfinals)
8. (Latvia) Daniela Vismane (quarterfinals)

== Draw ==
=== Key ===
- Q = Qualifier
- WC = Wild card
- LL = Lucky loser
- Alt = Alternate
- SE = Special exempt
- PR = Protected ranking
- ITF = ITF entry
- JE = Junior exempt
- w/o = Walkover
- r = Retired
- d = Defaulted
- SR = Special ranking

=== Finals ===
Semifinals
WC	(Italy) Nuria Brancaccio	4	1
(Italy) Camilla Rosatello	6	6
5	(Japan) Moyuka Uchijima	3	3
2	(France) Kristina Mladenovic	6	6

Final
(Italy) Camilla Rosatello	4	6	6^{3}
2	(France) Kristina Mladenovic	6	4	7^{7}

=== Top half ===
First round
1	(France) C Burel	5	6	4
(Germany) K Gerlach	7	2	6
WC	(Italy) N Brancaccio	4	6	6
M Bondarenko	6	0	1
(Italy) M Di Giuseppe	2	6	6
WC	(Italy) M Delai	6	2	2
Q	(Romania) O Gavrilă	1	5
7	(Italy) F Di Sarra	6	7
4	(Greece) D Papamichail	6	6^{4}	6^{5}
(Italy) C Ferrando	1	7^{7}	7^{7}
(Croatia) P Marčinko	5	6	6^{2}
(Italy) C Rosatello	7	2	7^{7}
(Romania) A Prisăcariu	6	6
Q	(Estonia) E Malõgina	3	4
WC	(Italy) A Aragosa	1	2
8	(Latvia) D Vismane	6	6

Second round
(Germany) K Gerlach	7	0	4
WC	(Italy) N Brancaccio	5	6	6
(Italy) M Di Giuseppe	6^{5}	1
7	(Italy) F Di Sarra	7^{7}	6
(Italy) C Ferrando	5	2
(Italy) C Rosatello	7	6
(Romania) A Prisăcariu	2	7^{7}	1
8	(Latvia) D Vismane	6	6^{5}	6

Quarterfinals
WC	(Italy) N Brancaccio	7^{7}	6
7	(Italy) F Di Sarra	6^{1}	2
(Italy) C Rosatello	6	6
8	(Latvia) D Vismane	3	1

Semifinals
WC	(Italy) N Brancaccio	4	1
(Italy) C Rosatello	6	6

=== Bottom half ===
First round
5	(Japan) M Uchijima	6	6
Q	(Italy) A Raggi	1	3
Q	(Italy) F Bilardo	2	3
Q	(Kazakhstan) Z Kulambayeva	6	6
(Brazil) G Cé	6	2	6^{6}
Q	(Italy) D Cherubini	4	6	7^{8}
Q	(Italy) I Lavino	2	3
3	E Avanesyan	6	6
6	(Switzerland) S Waltert	3	4
WC	(Italy) L Pigato	6	6
(Italy) B Turati	3	3
(Portugal) F Jorge	6	6
(Norway) M Helgø	6	6
Q	(United Kingdom) M Mutavdzic	0	3
(Romania) C Dinu	3	2
2	(France) K Mladenovic	6	6

Second round
5	(Japan) M Uchijima	6	6
Q	(Kazakhstan) Z Kulambayeva	4	3
Q	(Italy) D Cherubini	6	7
3	E Avanesyan	3	5
WC	(Italy) L Pigato	5	6	6
(Portugal) F Jorge	7	2	3
(Norway) M Helgø	3	4
2	(France) K Mladenovic	6	6

Quarterfinals
5	(Japan) M Uchijima	6	6
Q	(Italy) D Cherubini	3	1
WC	(Italy) L Pigato	2	5
2	(France) K Mladenovic	6	7

Semifinals
5	(Japan) M Uchijima	3	3
2	(France) K Mladenovic	6	6
