= Internazionali di Calabria =

Tennis tournament in Italy

WTA 125
- Event name: Internazionali di Calabria
- Location: Rende, Calabria, Italy
- Venue: Chiappetta Sport Village
- Category: WTA 125
- Surface: Clay
- Draw: 32S/16Q/16D
- Prize money: $115,000

Current champions (2025)
- Singles: (Czech Republic) Sára Bejlek
- Doubles: (Italy) Nicole Fossa Huergo (Georgia (country)) Ekaterine Gorgodze

The Internazionali di Calabria is a tournament for professional female tennis players played on outdoor clay courts. The event is classified as a WTA 125 tournament and is held at the Chiappetta Sport Village in Rende, Italy.

== Past finals ==
=== Singles ===
Year	Champion	Runners-up	Score
2026	Not held		
2025	(Czech Republic) Sára Bejlek	(Serbia) Lola Radivojević	6–2, 6–7^{(1–7)}, 6–3

=== Doubles ===
Year	Champions	Runners-up	Score
2026	Not held		
2025	(Italy) Nicole Fossa Huergo (Georgia (country)) Ekaterine Gorgodze	(Italy) Federica Urgesi (Italy) Aurora Zantedeschi	3–6, 6–1, [10–4]
