= 2022 Internazionali Femminili di Tennis Città di Caserta – Doubles =

Doubles
- 2022 Internazionali Femminili di Tennis Città di Caserta

Final
- Champions: (Greece) Despina Papamichail (Italy) Camilla Rosatello
- Runners-up: (Portugal) Francisca Jorge (Portugal) Matilde Jorge
- Score: 4–6, 6–2, [10–6]

Events
Singles	Doubles
← 2019 ·	Internazionali Femminili di Tennis Città di Caserta	· 2023 →

Lizette Cabrera and Julia Grabher were the defending champions but chose not to participate.

Despina Papamichail and Camilla Rosatello won the title, defeating Francisca and Matilde Jorge in the final, 4–6, 6–2, [10–6].

== Seeds ==
1. (Brazil) Rebeca Pereira / (Indonesia) Jessy Rompies (semifinals)
2. (Greece) Despina Papamichail / (Italy) Camilla Rosatello (champions)
3. (Brazil) Ingrid Gamarra Martins / (United Kingdom) Emily Webley-Smith (first round)
4. (Bulgaria) Isabella Shinikova / (Latvia) Daniela Vismane (first round)

== Draw ==
=== Key ===
- Q = Qualifier
- WC = Wild card
- LL = Lucky loser
- Alt = Alternate
- SE = Special exempt
- PR = Protected ranking
- ITF = ITF entry
- JE = Junior exempt
- w/o = Walkover
- r = Retired
- d = Defaulted
- SR = Special ranking

=== Draw ===
First round
(Kazakhstan) Z Kulambayeva (Estonia) E Malõgina	3	6	[10]
(Italy) V Ferrara (Italy) G Pedone	6	2	[6]
4	(Bulgaria) I Shinikova (Latvia) D Vismane	2	6^{5}
(Portugal) F Jorge (Portugal) M Jorge	6	7^{7}
(Italy) G Ceschi (Italy) E Chiesa	4	2
(Italy) D Valente (Italy) A Zucchini	6	6
(Italy) N Brancaccio (Italy) L Pigato	2	6	[6]
(Romania) C Dinu (Romania) O Gavrilă	6	4	[10]
(Romania) A Prisăcariu (Bosnia and Herzegovina) A Wagner	6	3	[10]
3	(Brazil) I Gamarra Martins (United Kingdom) E Webley-Smith	3	6	[5]
(Croatia) P Marčinko (United Kingdom) M Mutavdzic	3	3
(Italy) M Delai (Italy) C Giovine	6	6
(Italy) M Di Giuseppe (Italy) B Turati	3	1
2	(Greece) D Papamichail (Italy) C Rosatello	6	6

Quarterfinals
1	(Brazil) R Pereira (Indonesia) J Rompies	2	6	[10]
(Kazakhstan) Z Kulambayeva (Estonia) E Malõgina	6	2	[2]
(Portugal) F Jorge (Portugal) M Jorge	6	7^{8}
(Italy) D Valente (Italy) A Zucchini	2	6^{6}
(Romania) C Dinu (Romania) O Gavrilă	6	4	[10]
(Romania) A Prisăcariu (Bosnia and Herzegovina) A Wagner	3	6	[7]
(Italy) M Delai (Italy) C Giovine	1	0
2	(Greece) D Papamichail (Italy) C Rosatello	6	6

Semifinals
1	(Brazil) R Pereira (Indonesia) J Rompies	3	1
(Portugal) F Jorge (Portugal) M Jorge	6	6
(Romania) C Dinu (Romania) O Gavrilă	4	2
2	(Greece) D Papamichail (Italy) C Rosatello	6	6

Final
(Portugal) F Jorge (Portugal) M Jorge	6	2	[6]
2	(Greece) D Papamichail (Italy) C Rosatello	4	6	[10]
