= Internazionali Femminili di Tennis Città di Caserta =

- 2026 Internazionali Femminili di Tennis Città di Caserta

ITF Women's Tour
- Event name: Internazionali Femminili di Tennis Città di Caserta
- Location: Caserta, Italy
- Venue: ASD Tennis Club Caserta
- Category: ITF Women's World Tennis Tour
- Surface: Clay / outdoor
- Draw: 32S/32Q/16D
- Prize money: $60,000

The Internazionali Femminili di Tennis Città di Caserta is a tournament for professional female tennis players played on outdoor clay courts. The event is classified as a $60,000 ITF Women's World Tennis Tour tournament and has been held in Caserta, Italy, since 1982.

== Past finals ==
=== Singles ===
Year	Champion	Runner-up	Score
2026	(Italy) Federica Urgesi	(Italy) Alessandra Mazzola	6–4, 3–6, 6–1
2025	(Spain) Andrea Lázaro García	(France) Alice Ramé	4–6, 6–3, 6–0
2024	(Spain) Leyre Romero Gormaz	(Switzerland) Jil Teichmann	6–2, 4–6, 6–4
2023	(United States) Hailey Baptiste	(Cyprus) Raluca Șerban	6–3, 6–2
2022	(France) Kristina Mladenovic	(Italy) Camilla Rosatello	6–4, 4–6, 7–6^{(7–3)}
2020–21	Tournament cancelled due to the COVID-19 pandemic		
2019	(Russia) Varvara Gracheva	(Kazakhstan) Anna Danilina	6–3, 7–5
2018	(Belgium) Kimberley Zimmermann	(Italy) Stefania Rubini	1–6, 7–5, 6–1
2017	(United States) Claire Liu	(Spain) Paula Badosa	6–3, 6–3
2016	(Bulgaria) Isabella Shinikova	(Slovenia) Dalila Jakupović	6–2, 4–6, 6–2
2015	(Russia) Daria Kasatkina	(Turkey) İpek Soylu	7–6^{(7–4)}, 6–1
2014	(Bulgaria) Isabella Shinikova	(Ukraine) Marianna Zakarlyuk	4–6, 6–3, 6–4
2013	(Czech Republic) Renata Voráčová	(Brazil) Beatriz Haddad Maia	6–4, 6–1
2012	(Peru) Bianca Botto	(Serbia) Aleksandra Krunić	6–1, 6–0
2011	Not held		
2010	(Italy) Romina Oprandi	(United States) Sloane Stephens	6–3, 6–3
2009	(Italy) Martina Di Giuseppe	(Bulgaria) Martina Gledacheva	7–6^{(9–7)}, 6–1
2008	(Australia) Jelena Dokic	(Austria) Patricia Mayr	6–3, 6–1
2007	(Italy) Valentina Sulpizio	(Argentina) María-Belén Corbalán	7–6^{(7–2)}, 0–6, 6–1
2006	(Luxembourg) Mandy Minella	(Russia) Alisa Kleybanova	6–2, 6–4
2005	(Croatia) Ivana Lisjak	(Czech Republic) Olga Blahotová	6–3, 7–5
2004	(Spain) Paula García	(Czech Republic) Kateřina Böhmová	0–6, 6–3, 6–2
2003	(Bosnia and Herzegovina) Mervana Jugić-Salkić	(Hungary) Virág Németh	6–7^{(4–7)}, 3–1, ret.
2002	(Czech Republic) Klára Koukalová	(Argentina) Mariana Díaz Oliva	7–6^{(7–4)}, 5–7, 7–5
2001	(Italy) Tathiana Garbin	(Spain) María José Martínez Sánchez	3–6, 7–6^{(7–3)}, 6–2
2000	(Argentina) María Emilia Salerni	(Morocco) Lamia Essaadi	6–4, 6–1
1995–99	Not held		
1994	(Spain) Neus Ávila	(Germany) Anca Barna	6–1, 6–2
1993	(France) Sarah Pitkowski	(Paraguay) Rossana de los Ríos	7–5, 6–2
1992	(Czechoslovakia) Kateřina Kroupová	(Czechoslovakia) Radka Bobková	6–4, 6–2
1991	(Switzerland) Emanuela Zardo	(Spain) Ana Segura	6–7, 7–6, 6–1
1990	(Poland) Katarzyna Nowak	(Soviet Union) Elena Brioukhovets	1–6, 6–2, 6–3
1989	(Australia) Rachel McQuillan	(Switzerland) Emanuela Zardo	4–6, 7–5, 6–3
1988	(Italy) Cathy Caverzasio	(Brazil) Andrea Vieira	6–2, 3–6, 7–5
1987	(Italy) Laura Lapi	(Greece) Olga Tsarbopoulou	6–1, 6–3
1986	(Brazil) Gisele Miró	(West Germany) Wiltrud Probst	6–3, 2–6, 6–3
1985	(Italy) Laura Garrone	(Italy) Laura Golarsa	5–7, 6–2, 6–4
1984	(Soviet Union) Larisa Savchenko	(Soviet Union) Elena Eliseenko	6–2, 6–1
1983	(Italy) Sandra Cecchini	(Socialist Federal Republic of Yugoslavia) Sabrina Goleš	2–6, 7–6, 6–2
1982	(Czechoslovakia) Hana Fukárková	(Bulgaria) Manuela Maleeva	6–4, 6–1

=== Doubles ===
Year	Champions	Runners-up	Score
2026	(United Kingdom) Freya Christie (United Kingdom) Eden Silva	(Spain) Yvonne Cavallé Reimers (Brazil) Laura Pigossi	3–6, 6–4, [10–4]
2025	(Chinese Taipei) Cho I-hsuan (Chinese Taipei) Cho Yi-tsen	(Spain) Ariana Geerlings (Japan) Wakana Sonobe	6–3, 7–6^{(7–5)}
2024	(Colombia) Yuliana Lizarazo (Greece) Despina Papamichail	(United Kingdom) Ali Collins (Colombia) María Paulina Pérez	4–6, 6–3, [10–3]
2023	Anastasia Tikhonova (Japan) Moyuka Uchijima	(Greece) Despina Papamichail (Italy) Camilla Rosatello	6–4, 6–2
2022	(Greece) Despina Papamichail (Italy) Camilla Rosatello	(Portugal) Francisca Jorge (Portugal) Matilde Jorge	4–6, 6–2, [10–6]
2020–21	Tournament cancelled due to the COVID-19 pandemic		
2019	(Australia) Lizette Cabrera (Austria) Julia Grabher	(Romania) Elena Bogdan (Slovakia) Vivien Juhászová	6–3, 6–4
2018	(Chinese Taipei) Chen Pei-hsuan (Chinese Taipei) Wu Fang-hsien	(Australia) Jaimee Fourlis (Australia) Ellen Perez	7–6^{(8–6)}, 6–3
2017	(Italy) Deborah Chiesa (Italy) Martina Colmegna	(Latvia) Diāna Marcinkēviča (Italy) Camilla Rosatello	7–6^{(7–5)}, 6–4
2016	(United Kingdom) Amanda Carreras (Italy) Alice Savoretti	(Ukraine) Oleksandra Korashvili (Russia) Maria Marfutina	6–7^{(9–11)}, 7–6^{(7–5)}, [10–6]
2015	(Georgia (country)) Ekaterine Gorgodze (Georgia (country)) Sofia Shapatava	(Italy) Alice Matteucci (Turkey) İpek Soylu	6–0, 7–6^{(8–6)}
2014	(Australia) Samantha Harris (Australia) Sally Peers	(Georgia (country)) Ekaterine Gorgodze (Georgia (country)) Sofia Kvatsabaia	6–3, 7–6^{(8–6)}
2013	(Montenegro) Danka Kovinić (Czech Republic) Renata Voráčová	(Romania) Elena Bogdan (Romania) Cristina Dinu	6–4, 7–6^{(7–3)}
2012	(Poland) Katarzyna Piter (Slovakia) Romana Tabak	(Switzerland) Viktorija Golubic (Serbia) Aleksandra Krunić	6–2, 6–3
2011	Not held		
2010	(Belarus) Ekaterina Dzehalevich (France) Irena Pavlovic	(Italy) Nicole Clerico (Canada) Rebecca Marino	6–3, 6–3
2009	(Italy) Stefania Chieppa (Italy) Giulia Gatto-Monticone	(Italy) Martina Di Giuseppe (Italy) Andreea Vaideanu	6–1, 6–4
2008	(China) Han Xinyun (China) Xu Yifan	(Australia) Sophie Ferguson (Australia) Christina Wheeler	4–6, 6–4, [10–8]
2007	(Italy) Lisa Sabino (Germany) Andrea Sieveke	(Ukraine) Irina Buryachok (Russia) Varvara Galanina	7–6^{(7–4)}, 6–2
2006	(Czech Republic) Petra Cetkovská (Czech Republic) Sandra Záhlavová	(Italy) Silvia Disderi (Italy) Valentina Sulpizio	6–2, 6–0
2005	(Czech Republic) Olga Blahotová (Argentina) Soledad Esperón	(Croatia) Ivana Lisjak (Croatia) Nadja Pavić	7–5, 7–5
2004	(Spain) Rosa María Andrés Rodríguez (Romania) Andreea Vanc	(Italy) Giulia Casoni (Czech Republic) Vladimíra Uhlířová	6–1, 4–6, 6–4
2003	(Estonia) Maret Ani (Italy) Giulia Casoni	(Spain) Rosa María Andrés Rodríguez (Morocco) Bahia Mouhtassine	7–5, 7–5
2002	(Argentina) Erica Krauth (Brazil) Vanessa Menga	(Croatia) Maja Palaveršić Coopersmith (Canada) Marie-Ève Pelletier	6–4, 6–4
2001	(Spain) Eva Bes (Spain) Lourdes Domínguez Lino	(Spain) María José Martínez Sánchez (Spain) Gisela Riera	6–1, 7–6^{(7–5)}
2000	(Slovakia) Silvia Uríčková (Russia) Elena Voropaeva	(Argentina) Natalia Gussoni (Argentina) Sabrina Valenti	7–6^{(8–6)}, 2–6, 7–5
1995–99	Not held		
1994	(Italy) Flora Perfetti (Hungary) Virág Csurgó	(Japan) Mami Donoshiro (Japan) Kyōko Nagatsuka	6–1, 7–5
1993	(Slovenia) Karin Lušnic (Croatia) Maja Murić	(Chile) Paula Cabezas (Italy) Adriana Serra Zanetti	2–6, 6–2, 6–4
1992	(Czechoslovakia) Radka Bobková (Czechoslovakia) Jana Pospíšilová	(Spain) Estefanía Bottini (Spain) Virginia Ruano Pascual	6–3, 2–6, 7–6
1991	(Argentina) Inés Gorrochategui (Brazil) Andrea Vieira	(United States) Jennifer Fuchs (Sweden) Maria Strandlund	6–2, 6–2
1990	(Soviet Union) Elena Brioukhovets (Soviet Union) Eugenia Maniokova	(Czechoslovakia) Michaela Frimmelová (Hungary) Réka Szikszay	4–6, 6–3, 6–1
1989	(Soviet Union) Eugenia Maniokova (Soviet Union) Natalia Medvedeva	(Finland) Nanne Dahlman (Australia) Kate McDonald	6–4, 6–4
1988	(United States) Jennifer Fuchs (Sweden) Maria Strandlund	(Netherlands) Hellas ter Riet (Czechoslovakia) Olga Votavová	7–6, 6–3
1987	(Soviet Union) Eugenia Maniokova (Soviet Union) Natalia Medvedeva	(West Germany) Heike Thoms (Greece) Olga Tsarbopoulou	6–4, 6–3
1986	(Brazil) Gisele Miró (Argentina) Bettina Fulco	(West Germany) Wiltrud Probst (Netherlands) Marianne van der Torre	6–3, 6–3
1985	(Italy) Patrizia Murgo (Italy) Barbara Romanò	(West Germany) Gabriela Dinu (Italy) Sabina Simmonds	3–6, 6–4, 6–4
1984	(Socialist Federal Republic of Yugoslavia) Renata Šašak (Soviet Union) Larisa Savchenko	(Czechoslovakia) Marie Pinterová (Czechoslovakia) Renáta Tomanová	6–1, 6–3
1983	(Sweden) Helena Olsson (Denmark) Tine Scheuer-Larsen	(Italy) Anna Iuale (Czechoslovakia) Lea Plchová	6–2, 6–3
1982	(Italy) Elisabetta Lazzeri (Italy) Paola Ippoliti	(Italy) Francesca Ciardi (Italy) Ionita Nesti	2–6, 7–5, 9–7
