= Camilla Rosatello =

Italian tennis player

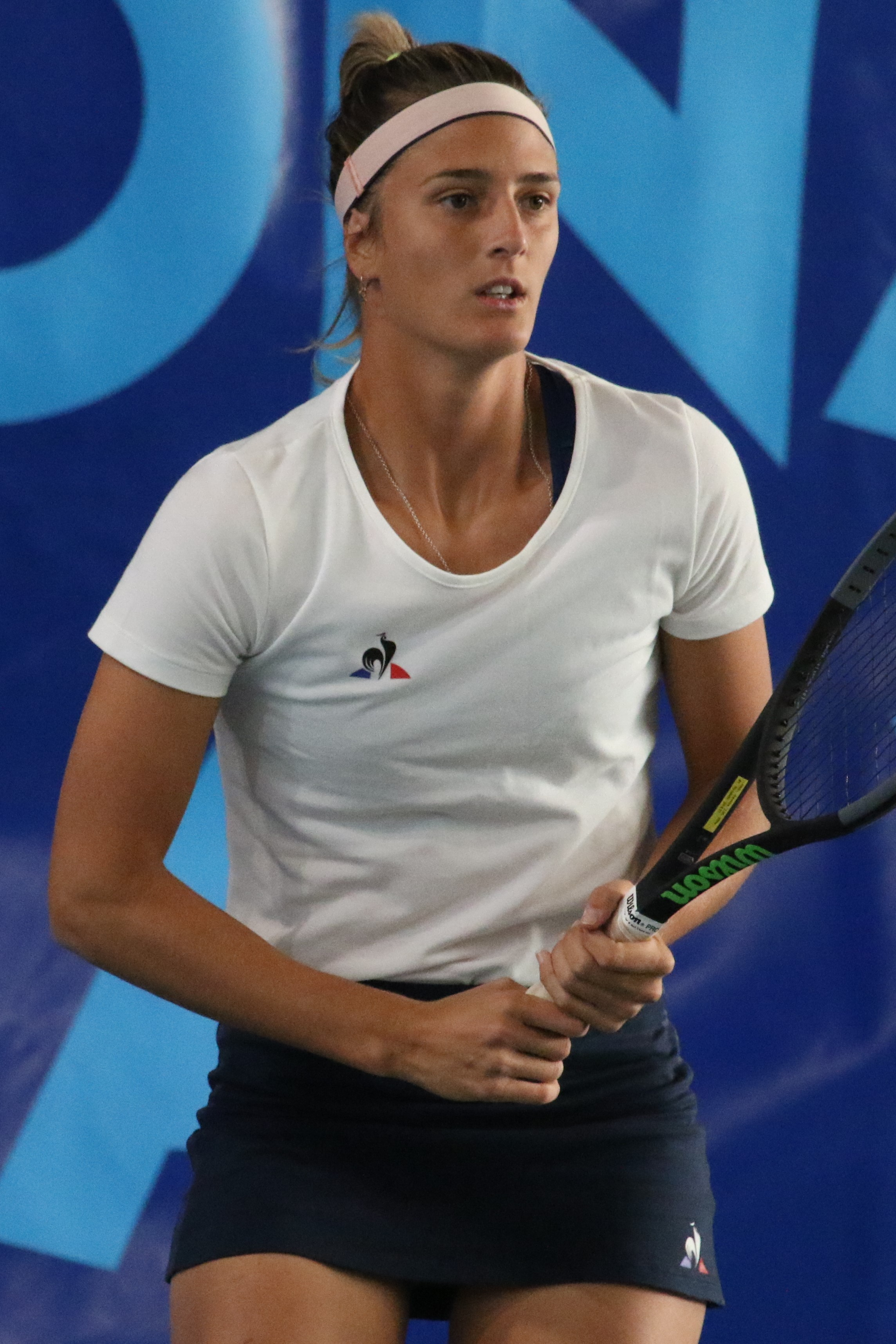
- Rosatello at the 2021 ITF Poitiers
- Country (sports): Italy
- Residence: Lagnasco, Italy
- Born: 28 May 1995 (age 31) Saluzzo, Italy
- Plays: Right (two-handed both sides)
- Prize money: $449,924

Singles
- Career record: 385–313
- Career titles: 2 ITF
- Highest ranking: No. 201 (6 October 2025)
- Current ranking: No. 389 (10 August 2026)

Doubles
- Career record: 383–211
- Career titles: 2 WTA Challengers, 40 ITF
- Highest ranking: No. 72 (27 May 2024)
- Current ranking: No. 354 (10 August 2026)

Grand Slam doubles results
- Australian Open: 2R (2025)
- French Open: 1R (2024)
- Wimbledon: 1R (2024)
- US Open: 1R (2024)
- Last updated on: 21 August 2026.

Camilla Rosatello (born 28 May 1995) is an Italian tennis player.

She has a career-high singles ranking of world No. 225, achieved on 7 August 2017 and peaked at No. 72 in doubles on 27 May 2024. Rosatello has won two doubles titles on the WTA Challenger Tour along with two singles and 40 doubles titles on the ITF Women's Circuit.

On the ITF Junior Circuit, she had a career-high combined ranking of No. 30, achieved in January 2013.

Rosatello has represented Italy in Fed Cup competition, where she has a win-loss record of 0–1.

== Career ==
Rosatello made her WTA 1000 debut at the 2018 Italian Open, where she received a wildcard into the singles main draw, losing in the first round to qualifier Kaia Kanepi.

She also received a wildcard for the 2023 Italian Open but lost her first-round match to Claire Liu, in three sets.

In July 2023, Rosatello reached her first WTA Tour final at the Palermo Ladies Open with fellow Italian Angelica Moratelli, losing to Kimberley Zimmermann and Yana Sizikova.

At the 2024 Grand Prix SAR La Princesse Lalla Meryem in Rabat, Morocco, she defeated world No. 36, Yuan Yue, in the opening round to record her first win against a top-50 ranked player. She saved 12 break points, before winning the first set. She retired due to injury in her second round match with Kamilla Rakhimova.

== WTA Tour finals ==
=== Doubles: 2 (runner-ups) ===
Legend WTA 1000 WTA 500 WTA 250 (0–2)	Finals by surface Clay (0–2)

Result	Date	Tournament	Tier	Surface	Partner	Opponents	Score
Loss	Jul 2023	Palermo Ladies Open, Italy	WTA 250	Clay	(Italy) Angelica Moratelli	Yana Sizikova (Belgium) Kimberley Zimmermann	2–6, 4–6
Loss	May 2025	Rabat Grand Prix, Morocco	WTA 250	Clay	(Italy) Angelica Moratelli	(Australia) Maya Joint (Georgia (country)) Oksana Kalashnikova	3–6, 5–7

== WTA 125 finals ==
=== Doubles: 3 (2 titles, 1 runner-up) ===
Result	W–L	Date	Tournament	Surface	Partner	Opponents	Score
Win	1–0	Sep 2023	Open Romania Ladies, Romania	Clay	(Italy) Angelica Moratelli	(Greece) Valentini Grammatikopoulou (Czech Republic) Anna Sisková	7–5, 6–4
Loss	1–1	Feb 2024	Puerto Vallarta Open, Mexico	Hard	(Italy) Angelica Moratelli	Iryna Shymanovich (Mexico) Renata Zarazúa	2–6, 6–7^{(1–7)}
Win	2–1	Mar 2024	Antalya Challenger, Turkey	Clay	(Italy) Angelica Moratelli	(Hungary) Tímea Babos; Vera Zvonareva	6–3, 3–6, [15–13]

== ITF Circuit finals ==
=== Singles: 13 (2 titles, 11 runner-ups) ===
Legend $50/60,000 tournaments (1–2) $25,000 tournaments (1–2) $10/15,000 tournaments (0–7)	Finals by surface Hard (0–5) Clay (2–6)

Result	W–L	Date	Tournament	Tier	Surface	Opponent	Score
Loss	0–1	May 2013	ITF Sharm El Sheikh, Egypt	10,000	Hard	(Turkey) İpek Soylu	5–7, 1–6
Loss	0–2	Jul 2013	ITF Valladolid, Spain	10,000	Hard	(Spain) Andrea Lázaro García	3–6, 6–3, 0–6
Loss	0–3	Oct 2015	ITF Pula, Italy	10,000	Clay	(Germany) Anne Schäfer	1–6, 3–6
Loss	0–4	Sep 2016	Open de Saint-Malo, France	50,000	Clay	(Ukraine) Maryna Zanevska	1–6, 3–6
Loss	0–5	Mar 2017	ITF Amiens, France	15,000	Clay (i)	(France) Audrey Albié	3–6, 4–6
Loss	0–6	Jul 2017	ITF Périgueux, France	25,000	Clay	(Switzerland) Patty Schnyder	4–6, 5–7
Loss	0–7	Oct 2019	ITF Sharm El Sheikh, Egypt	W15	Hard	(Belarus) Viktoryia Kanapatskaya	2–6, 2–6
Loss	0–8	Sep 2020	ITF Trieste, Italy	W15	Hard	(Italy) Federica di Sarra	0–6, 1–6
Loss	0–9	Mar 2021	ITF Manacor, Spain	W15	Hard	(Spain) Marina Bassols Ribera	5–7, 2–6
Win	1–9	Apr 2022	ITF Santa Margherita di Pula, Italy	W25	Clay	Ekaterina Reyngold	6–3, 6–4
Loss	1–10	Jun 2022	Internazionali di Caserta, Italy	W60	Clay	(France) Kristina Mladenovic	4–6, 6–4, 6–7^{(3)}
Loss	1–11	Sep 2022	ITF Santa Margherita di Pula, Italy	W25	Clay	(Germany) Katharina Hobgarski	1–6, 1–6
Win	2–11	Sep 2025	ITF Bucharest, Romania	W75	Clay	(Romania) Elena Ruxandra Bertea	5–7, 6–3, 6–4

=== Doubles: 72 (40 titles, 32 runner-ups) ===
Legend $100,000 tournaments (1–1) $50/60,000 tournaments (8–6) $25,000 tournaments (14–13) $10/15,000 tournaments (16–12)	Finals by surface Hard (12–12) Clay (27–20) Carpet (1–0)

Result	W–L	Date	Tournament	Tier	Surface	Partner	Opponents	Score
Loss	0–1	Oct 2010	ITF Antalya, Turkey	10,000	Clay	(Turkey) Başak Eraydın	(Slovakia) Chantal Škamlová (Slovakia) Nikola Vajdová	1–6, 3–6
Win	1–1	Sep 2011	ITF Sanremo, Italy	10,000	Clay	(Italy) Benedetta Davato	(Italy) Francesca Gariglio (Italy) Giorgia Marchetti	6–2, 6–4
Win	2–1	Apr 2013	ITF Heraklion, Greece	10,000	Carpet	(Serbia) Tamara Čurović	(Spain) Olga Parres Azcoitia (Spain) Nuria Párrizas Díaz	7–6^{(4)}, 6–3
Win	3–1	May 2013	ITF Sharm El Sheikh, Egypt	10,000	Hard	(China) Zhu Aiwen	(United Kingdom) Anna Fitzpatrick (Kazakhstan) Kamila Kerimbayeva	6–4, 6–3
Win	4–1	Jul 2013	ITF Turin, Italy	10,000	Hard	(Russia) Olga Doroshina	(Italy) Maria Masini (Japan) Yuka Mori	6–2, 6–1
Win	5–1	Jul 2013	ITF Valladolid, Spain	10,000	Hard	(India) Rutuja Bhosale	(Spain) Lucía Cervera Vázquez (Spain) Carolina Prats Millán	6–4, 6–0
Loss	5–2	Aug 2013	ITF Locri, Italy	10,000	Clay	(Italy) Alice Matteucci	(Greece) Despina Papamichail (Italy) Federica di Sarra	3–6, 6–3, [4–10]
Loss	5–3	Nov 2013	GB Pro-Series Loughborough, United Kingdom	10,000	Hard (i)	(Italy) Francesca Palmigiano	(United Kingdom) Jocelyn Rae (United Kingdom) Anna Smith	0–6, 6–4, [3–10]
Win	6–3	Jan 2014	ITF Fort-de-France, Guadeloupe	10,000	Hard	(France) Manon Peral	(Lithuania) Akvilė Paražinskaitė (Netherlands) Rosalie van der Hoek	6–4, 6–4
Loss	6–4	Feb 2014	ITF Mâcon, France	10,000	Hard (i)	(Italy) Federica di Sarra	(France) Audrey Albie (France) Kinnie Laisné	3–6, 6–2, [8–10]
Loss	6–5	Apr 2014	Chiasso Open, Switzerland	25,000	Clay	(Italy) Alice Matteucci	(Switzerland) Chiara Grimm (Switzerland) Jil Teichmann	5–7, 3–6
Win	7–5	Jun 2014	ITF Brussels, Belgium	10,000	Clay	(Italy) Alice Matteucci	(Romania) Diana Buzean (Russia) Natela Dzalamidze	6–4, 3–6, [10–3]
Win	8–5	Aug 2014	ITF Innsbruck, Austria	10,000	Clay	(Poland) Zuzanna Maciejewska	(Bulgaria) Isabella Shinikova (Bulgaria) Julia Stamatova	6–2, 6–2
Loss	8–6	Sep 2014	ITF Antalya, Turkey	10,000	Hard	(Belgium) Déborah Kerfs	(China) Ye Qiuyu (China) You Xiaodi	5–7, 6–2, [8–10]
Loss	8–7	Jan 2015	ITF Sharm El Sheikh, Egypt	10,000	Hard	(Japan) Yuuki Tanaka	(Austria) Pia König (Netherlands) Eva Wacanno	6–4, 6–7^{(2)}, [5–10]
Win	9–7	Mar 2015	ITF Solarino, Italy	10,000	Hard	(Italy) Deborah Chiesa	(Italy) Marta Bellucco (Italy) Camilla Scala	7–6^{(4)}, 6–3
Loss	9–8	May 2015	ITF Antalya, Turkey	10,000	Hard	(Romania) Nicoleta Dascălu	(Bosnia and Herzegovina) Anita Husarić (Ukraine) Alyona Sotnikova	1–6, 2–6
Loss	9–9	Jul 2015	ITF Getxo, Spain	10,000	Clay	(France) Laëtitia Sarrazin	(Spain) Lucía Cervera Vázquez (Australia) Alexandra Nancarrow	3–6, 5–7
Win	10–9	Aug 2015	ITF El Espinar, Spain	10,000	Hard	(Spain) Olga Parres Azcoitia	(Spain) Arabela Fernández Rabener (United Kingdom) Francesca Stephenson	6–1, 6–2
Win	11–9	Oct 2015	ITF Pula, Italy	10,000	Clay	(Hungary) Vanda Lukács	(United States) Dasha Ivanova (Argentina) Melany Krywoj	6–3, 6–2
Win	12–9	Nov 2015	ITF Casablanca, Morocco	25,000	Clay	(Spain) Olga Parres Azcoitia	(France) Alice Bacquié (Portugal) Inês Murta	6–2, 6–4
Win	13–9	Nov 2015	ITF Casablanca, Morocco	10,000	Clay	(Spain) Olga Parres Azcoitia	(Austria) Melanie Klaffner (Russia) Anna Morgina	6–2, ret.
Win	14–9	Nov 2015	ITF Casablanca, Morocco	10,000	Clay	(Spain) Olga Parres Azcoitia	(Romania) Irina Fetecău (Romania) Camelia Hristea	6–4, 6–3
Win	15–9	Aug 2016	ITF Bagnatica, Italy	25,000	Clay	(Italy) Alice Matteucci	(Switzerland) Conny Perrin (Russia) Yana Sizikova	6–4, 5–7, [10–5]
Loss	15–10	Oct 2016	ITF Pula, Italy	25,000	Clay	(Italy) Claudia Giovine	(Switzerland) Jil Teichmann (Slovenia) Tamara Zidanšek	2–6, 4–6
Win	16–10	Oct 2016	ITF Pula, Italy	25,000	Clay	(Liechtenstein) Kathinka von Deichmann	(Italy) Cristiana Ferrando (Slovakia) Vivien Juhászová	6–1, 3–6, [10–6]
Loss	16–11	Feb 2017	ITF Mâcon, France	15,000	Clay (i)	(Italy) Alice Matteucci	(Belarus) Ilona Kremen (Latvia) Diāna Marcinkēviča	7–6^{(5)}, 6–7^{(1)}, [4–10]
Win	17–11	Mar 2017	ITF Amiens, France	15,000	Clay (i)	(Norway) Melanie Stokke	(Belarus) Ilona Kremen (Latvia) Diāna Marcinkēviča	6–3, 6–0
Win	18–11	Apr 2017	ITF Pula, Italy	25,000	Clay	(Italy) Alice Matteucci	(Netherlands) Bibiane Schoofs (Poland) Sandra Zaniewska	6–1, 6–3
Loss	18–12	Apr 2017	ITF Pula, Italy	25,000	Clay	(Italy) Cristiana Ferrando	(Spain) Georgina García Pérez (United States) Bernarda Pera	4–6, 3–6
Loss	18–13	May 2017	Internazionali di Caserta, Italy	25,000	Clay	(Latvia) Diāna Marcinkēviča	(Italy) Deborah Chiesa (Italy) Martina Colmegna	6–7^{(5)}, 4–6
Win	19–13	Jun 2017	ITF Périgueux, France	25,000	Clay	(Belgium) Kimberley Zimmermann	(France) Manon Arcangioli (France) Shérazad Reix	6–4, 6–3
Win	20–13	Aug 2017	Ladies Open Hechingen, Germany	60,000	Clay	(Georgia (country)) Sofia Shapatava	(Germany) Romy Kölzer (Germany) Lena Rüffer	6–2, 6–4
Win	21–13	Oct 2017	ITF Pula, Italy	25,000	Clay	(Romania) Cristina Dinu	(Romania) Elena Bogdan (Bosnia and Herzegovina) Anita Husarić	6–2, 6–1
Win	22–13	Nov 2017	ITF Pula, Italy	25,000	Clay	(Italy) Claudia Giovine	(Italy) Anastasia Grymalska (Ukraine) Ganna Poznikhirenko	6–2, 2–6, [10–7]
Loss	22–14	Jan 2018	Open Andrézieux-Bouthéon, France	60,000	Hard (i)	(Belgium) Kimberley Zimmermann	(Belgium) Ysaline Bonaventure (Netherlands) Bibiane Schoofs	6–4, 5–7, [7–10]
Win	23–14	Sep 2018	ITF Bagnatica, Italy	25,000	Clay	(Italy) Giorgia Marchetti	(Italy) Deborah Chiesa (Italy) Jasmine Paolini	6–2, 2–6, [10–7]
Loss	23–15	Oct 2018	ITF Pula, Italy	25,000	Clay	(Italy) Giorgia Marchetti	(Romania) Cristina Dinu (Hungary) Réka Luca Jani	6–3, 1–6, [11–13]
Loss	23–16	Oct 2018	ITF Pula, Italy	25,000	Clay	(Romania) Cristina Dinu	(Russia) Valentina Ivakhnenko (Czech Republic) Anastasia Zarycká	2–6, 4–6
Loss	23–17	Apr 2019	ITF Pula, Italy	W25	Clay	(Italy) Giorgia Marchetti	(Germany) Katharina Hobgarski (Ukraine) Valeriya Strakhova	2–6, 7–6^{(4)}, [11–13]
Loss	23–18	Apr 2019	ITF Pula, Italy	W25	Clay	(Italy) Giorgia Marchetti	(Italy) Federica di Sarra (Italy) Anastasia Grymalska	4–6, 1–6
Loss	23–19	Jan 2020	ITF Manacor, Spain	W15	Hard	(Russia) Maria Marfutina	(Switzerland) Nina Stadler (France) Margot Yerolymos	6–2, 3–6, [5–10]
Loss	23–20	Jan 2020	ITF Manacor, Spain	W15	Hard	(Russia) Maria Marfutina	(Netherlands) Suzan Lamens (Switzerland) Nina Stadler	6–4, 1–6, [6–10]
Loss	23–21	Sep 2020	Grado Tennis Cup, Italy	W25	Clay	(Italy) Federica di Sarra	(Hungary) Anna Bondár (Hungary) Fanny Stollár	5–7, 2–6
Win	24–21	Jan 2021	ITF Manacor, Spain	W15	Hard	(Switzerland) Ylena In-Albon	(Spain) Ángela Fita Boluda (Russia) Oksana Selekhmeteva	7–6^{(3)}, 6–7^{(9)}, [10–5]
Loss	24–22	Feb 2021	ITF Manacor, Spain	W15	Hard	(Russia) Ekaterina Yashina	(Portugal) Francisca Jorge (Netherlands) Stéphanie Visscher	7–6^{(4)}, 3–6, [2–10]
Win	25–22	Feb 2021	Internationeaux de Poitiers, France	W25	Hard (i)	(Italy) Federica di Sarra	(France) Estelle Cascino (Australia) Seone Mendez	6–4, 6–3
Win	26–22	Mar 2021	ITF Le Havre, France	W15	Clay (i)	(Portugal) Francisca Jorge	(France) Anaëlle Leclercq (France) Lucie Nguyen Tan	7–5, 6–2
Win	27–22	May 2021	ITF Otočec, Slovenia	W25	Clay	(Italy) Federica di Sarra	(Croatia) Lea Bošković (Cyprus) Raluca Șerban	6–4, 6–7^{(4)}, [10–4]
Loss	27–23	Jun 2021	Grado Tennis Cup, Italy	W25	Clay	(Italy) Federica di Sarra	(Italy) Lucia Bronzetti (Bulgaria) Isabella Shinikova	4–6, 6–2, [8–10]
Win	28–23	Jun 2021	Open de Montpellier, France	W60	Clay	(France) Estelle Cascino	(Chinese Taipei) Liang En-shuo (China) Yuan Yue	6–3, 6–2
Win	29–23	May 2021	ITF Turin, Italy	W25	Clay	(Italy) Federica di Sarra	(Italy) Lucia Bronzetti (Italy) Aurora Zantedeschi	6–2, 6–2
Win	30–23	Sep 2021	Montreux Ladies Open, Switzerland	W60	Clay	(France) Estelle Cascino	(Switzerland) Conny Perrin (United Kingdom) Eden Silva	7–6^{(4)}, 6–4
Loss	30–24	Oct 2021	ITF Cherbourg-en-Cotentin, France	W25+H	Hard (i)	(France) Estelle Cascino	(United Kingdom) Sarah Beth Grey (Netherlands) Arianne Hartono	3–6, 2–6
Win	31–24	May 2022	ITF Pula, Italy	W25	Clay	(Italy) Angelica Moratelli	(Portugal) Matilde Jorge (Portugal) Francisca Jorge	6–4, 7–5
Win	32–24	Jun 2022	Internazionali di Caserta, Italy	W60	Clay	(Greece) Despina Papamichail	(Portugal) Matilde Jorge (Portugal) Francisca Jorge	4–6, 6–2, [10–6]
Loss	32–25	Jul 2022	Roma ATV, Italy	W60+H	Clay	(France) Estelle Cascino	(Ecuador) Andrea Gámiz (Netherlands) Eva Vedder	5–7, 6–2, [11–13]
Win	33–25	Sep 2022	ITF Pula, Italy	W25	Clay	(Italy) Angelica Moratelli	(Italy) Jennifer Ruggeri (Bolivia) Noelia Zeballos	6–4, 6–4
Loss	33–26	Oct 2022	ITF Pula, Italy	W25	Clay	(Italy) Aurora Zantedeschi	(United States) Jessie Aney (Greece) Sapfo Sakellaridi	6–7^{(1)}, 4–6
Win	34–26	Oct 2022	ITF Pula, Italy	W25	Clay	(Italy) Angelica Moratelli	(United States) Jessie Aney (Greece) Sapfo Sakellaridi	6–7^{(4)}, 7–5, [10–5]
Loss	34–27	Jun 2023	Internazionali di Caserta, Italy	W60	Clay	(Greece) Despina Papamichail	Anastasia Tikhonova (Japan) Moyuka Uchijima	4–6, 2–6
Win	35–27	Jun 2023	Roma ATV, Italy	W60	Clay	(Italy) Angelica Moratelli	(Romania) Oana Gavrilă (Greece) Sapfo Sakellaridi	3–6, 6–0, [10–7]
Win	36–27	Aug 2023	Internazionali di Cordenons, Italy	W60	Clay	(Italy) Angelica Moratelli	(Netherlands) Isabelle Haverlag (Netherlands) Eva Vedder	0–6, 6–2, [10–5]
Loss	36–28	Aug 2023	Přerov Cup, Czech Republic	W60	Clay	(Italy) Angelica Moratelli	(Czech Republic) Anna Sisková (Greece) Sapfo Sakellaridi	2–6, 3–6
Loss	36–29	Sep 2023	Prague Open, Czech Republic	W60	Clay	(Italy) Angelica Moratelli	(Poland) Martyna Kubka (Kazakhstan) Zhibek Kulambayeva	6–7^{(3)}, 4–6
Win	37–29	Oct 2023	ITF Les Franqueses del Vallès, Spain	W100	Hard	(Italy) Angelica Moratelli	(China) Gao Xinyu (Latvia) Darja Semeņistaja	4–6, 7–5, [10–6]
Win	38–29	Jan 2024	Bangalore Open, India	W50	Hard	(Latvia) Darja Semeņistaja	(Chinese Taipei) Li Yu-yun (Japan) Eri Shimizu	3–6, 6–2, [10–8]
Loss	38–30	Mar 2024	ITF Santo Domingo, Dominican Republic	W35	Hard	(Spain) Leyre Romero Gormaz	(United States) Carmen Corley (United States) Ivana Corley	2–6, 7–6^{(3)}, [5–10]
Loss	38–31	Apr 2024	Zaragoza Open, Spain	W100	Clay	(Italy) Angelica Moratelli	(Czech Republic) Miriam Kolodziejová (Czech Republic) Anna Sisková	2–6, 3–6
Win	39–31	Oct 2024	Open Nantes Atlantique, France	W50	Hard (i)	(United States) Tyra Caterina Grant	(Latvia) Diāna Marcinkēviča (Burundi) Sada Nahimana	6–2, 6–1
Win	40–31	Mar 2025	ITF Târgu Mureș, Romania	W75	Hard (i)	(Serbia) Nina Stojanović	(United Kingdom) Madeleine Brooks (Lithuania) Justina Mikulskytė	7–6^{(1)}, 6–2
Loss	40–32	Feb 2026	Porto Indoor, Portugal	W75	Hard (i)	(Italy) Angelica Moratelli	(Italy) Deborah Chiesa (Switzerland) Naïma Karamoko	2–6, 2–6
