= Federica Urgesi =

Italian tennis player (born 2005)

- Country (sports): Italy
- Born: 29 January 2005 (age 21)
- Plays: Right-handed
- Prize money: $109,348

Singles
- Career record: 103–94
- Career titles: 1 ITF
- Highest ranking: No. 285 (8 June 2026)
- Current ranking: No. 287 (13 July 2026)

Grand Slam singles results
- Australian Open Junior: 2R (2023)
- French Open Junior: 1R (2023)
- US Open Junior: 1R (2022)

Doubles
- Career record: 65–63
- Career titles: 4 ITF
- Highest ranking: No. 237 (13 July 2026)
- Current ranking: No. 237 (13 July 2026)

Grand Slam doubles results
- Australian Open Junior: W (2023)
- French Open Junior: SF (2023)
- Wimbledon Junior: SF (2023)
- US Open Junior: 1R (2022)
- Last updated on: 17 July 2026.

Federica Urgesi (born 29 January 2005) is an Italian tennis player. She has a career-high singles ranking of 285 by the WTA, achieved on 8 June 2026, and a highest WTA doubles ranking of 237, achieved on 13 July 2026.

== Career ==
Urgesi and her partner Renáta Jamrichová won the 2023 Australian Open girls' doubles title, beating Hayu Kinoshita and Sara Saito in the final.

Urgesi was given a wildcard to make her WTA Tour main-draw debut at the 2025 Italian Open, but lost in the first round to Bianca Andreescu.

Ranked world No. 410, she qualified for the main draw at the 2026 Italian Open, but again lost in the first round, this time to Viktorija Golubic.

== WTA 125 finals ==
=== Doubles: 2 (2 runner-ups) ===
Result	W–L	Date	Tournament	Surface	Partner	Opponents	Score
Loss	0–1	Oct 2025	Internazionali di Calabria, Italy	Clay	(Italy) Aurora Zantedeschi	(Italy) Nicole Fossa Huergo (Georgia (country)) Ekaterine Gorgodze	6–3, 1–6, [4–10]
Loss	0–2	May 2026	Parma Ladies Open, Italy	Clay	(Italy) Marta Lombardini	(Chinese Taipei) Cho I-hsuan (Chinese Taipei) Cho Yi-tsen	2–6, 2–6

== ITF Circuit finals ==
=== Singles: 4 (2 titles, 2 runner-ups) ===
Legend W75 tournaments (1–0) W35 tournaments (1–1) W15 tournaments (0–1)	Finals by surface Hard (1–0) Clay (1–2)

Result	W–L	Date	Tournament	Tier	Surface	Opponent	Score
Loss	0–1	May 2024	ITF Antalya, Turkey	W15	Clay	(Turkey) Duru Söke	6–3, 4–6, 2–6
Loss	0–2	Oct 2024	ITF Santa Margherita di Pula, Italy	W35	Clay	(Italy) Nicole Fossa Huergo	0–6, 6–3, 2–6
Win	1–2	Jun 2026	Internazionali di Caserta, Italy	W75	Clay	(Italy) Alessandra Mazzola	6–4, 3–6, 6–1
Win	2–2	Oct 2026	ITF Loulé, Portugal	W35	Hard	(Spain) Aran Teixidó García	6–2, 6–3

=== Doubles: 12 (4 titles, 8 runner-ups) ===
Legend W75 tournaments (0–1) W25/35 tournaments (2–6) W15 tournaments (2–1)	Finals by surface Hard (0–1) Clay (3–6) Carpet (1–1)

Result	W–L	Date	Tournament	Tier	Surface	Partner	Opponents	Score
Win	1–0	Nov 2021	ITF Solarino, Italy	W15	Carpet	(Italy) Denise Valente	(Italy) Melania Delai (Australia) Alicia Smith	7–5, 6–7^{(4)}, [10–5]
Win	2–0	Apr 2023	ITF Santa Margherita de Pula, Italy	W25	Clay	(Italy) Alessandra Teodosescu	(Belgium) Marie Benoît (Bosnia and Herzegovina) Dea Herdželaš	6–4, 6–3
Loss	2–1	Jul 2023	ITF Casablanca, Morocco	W15	Clay	(Italy) Alessandra Teodosescu	(France) Astrid Lew Yan Foon (Switzerland) Marie Mettraux	6–7^{(4)}, 6–7^{(5)}
Loss	2–2	Apr 2024	ITF Santa Margherita di Pula, Italy	W35	Clay	(Italy) Eleonora Alvisi	(Greece) Eleni Christofi (Bulgaria) Lia Karatancheva	0–6, 4–6
Win	3–2	Sep 2024	ITF Nogent-sur-Marne, France	W15	Clay	(Italy) Enola Chiesa	(Germany) Laura Böhner (Germany) Chantal Sauvant	6–1, 7–6^{(3)}
Loss	3–3	Oct 2024	ITF Santa Margherita di Pula, Italy	W35	Clay	(Italy) Alessandra Mazzola	(Finland) Laura Hietaranta (Greece) Sapfo Sakellaridi	3–6, 4–6
Loss	3–4	Oct 2024]	ITF Santa Margherita di Pula, Italy	W35	Clay	(Romania) Andreea Prisăcariu	(Greece) Sapfo Sakellaridi (Sweden) Lisa Zaar	3–6, 4–6
Loss	3–5	Nov 2024	ITF Solarino, Italy	W35	Carpet	Ksenia Laskutova	(Greece) Valentini Grammatikopoulou (Slovakia) Katarína Kužmová	3–6, 3–6
Loss	3–6	Jul 2025	ITF Turin, Italy	W35	Clay	(Italy) Noemi Basiletti	(Greece) Valentini Grammatikopoulou (Sweden) Lisa Zaar	3–6, 6–7^{(3)}
Win	4–6	Oct 2025	ITF Seville, Spain	W35	Clay	(Italy) Anastasia Abbagnato	(Spain) María Martínez Vaquero (Spain) Alba Rey García	6–4, 6–4
Loss	4–7	Jul 2026	ITF The Hague, Netherlands	W75	Clay	(Italy) Nuria Brancaccio	(Netherlands) Britt du Pree (Netherlands) Sarah van Emst	5–7, 3–6
Loss	4–8	Oct 2026	ITF Marsa, Malta	W35	Hard	(Italy) Vittoria Paganetti	(Greece) Valentini Grammatikopoulou (United Kingdom) Esther Adeshina	1–6, 3–6

=== Junior Grand Slam tournament finals ===
==== Doubles: 1 (title) ====
Result	Year	Tournament	Surface	Partner	Opponents	Score
Win	2023	Australian Open	Hard	(Slovakia) Renáta Jamrichová	(Japan) Hayu Kinoshita (Japan) Sara Saito	7–6^{(5)}, 1–6, [10–7]
