= Anastasia Abbagnato =

Italian tennis player

- Country (sports): Italy
- Born: 19 November 2003 (age 22)
- Prize money: $100,715

Singles
- Career record: 125–126
- Career titles: 1 ITF
- Highest ranking: No. 400 (6 October 2025)
- Current ranking: No. 590 (28 September 2026)

Doubles
- Career record: 112–66
- Career titles: 12 ITF
- Highest ranking: No. 188 (21 October 2024)
- Current ranking: No. 300 (28 September 2026)
- Last updated on: 29 September 2026.

Anastasia Abbagnato (born 19 November 2003) is an Italian professional tennis player.

Abbagnato has career-high WTA rankings of 400 in singles, reached on 6 October 2025, and 188 in doubles, achieved on 21 October 2024.

== Career ==
She made her WTA Tour main-draw debut 2024 at the WTA 1000 Italian Open, her home tournament, where she received a wildcard, partnering Aurora Zantedeschi in women's doubles; they reached the second round with a win over Linda Nosková and Lucia Bronzetti.

== ITF Circuit finals ==
=== Singles: 3 (1 title, 2 runner-ups) ===
Legend
W35 tournaments
W15 tournaments

Result	W–L	Date	Tournament	Tier	Surface	Opponent	Score
Loss	0–1	Sep 2022	ITF Cairo, Egypt	W15	Clay	(Egypt) Sandra Samir	2–6, 0–6
Win	1–1	Oct 2023	ITF Villena, Spain	W15	Hard	(United States) Adriana Reami	6–1, 6–2
Loss	1–2	Aug 2024	ITF Trieste, Italy	W35	Clay	(Spain) Carlota Martínez Círez	6–7^{(2)}, 4–6

=== Doubles: 20 (12 titles, 8 runner-ups) ===
Legend
W50 tournaments
W25/35 tournaments
W15 tournaments

Result	W-L	Date	Tournament	Tier	Surface	Partner	Opponents	Score
Win	1–0	Aug 2022	ITF Cairo, Egypt	W15	Clay	(Italy) Beatrice Stagno	(Sweden) Vanessa Ersöz (Turkey) Doğa Türkmen	6–1, 6–2
Win	2–0	Oct 2022	ITF Sharm El Sheikh, Egypt	W15	Hard	(Italy) Beatrice Stagno	Aglaya Fedorova; Elena Pridankina	2–6, 6–3, [10–5]
Win	3–0	Dec 2022	ITF Sharm El Sheikh	W15	Hard	(Egypt) Sandra Samir	(Belgium) Tilwith Di Girolami (Netherlands) Stéphanie Visscher	w/o
Win	4–0	Jul 2023	ITF Monastir, Tunisia	W15	Hard	(Italy) Virginia Ferrara	(Ukraine) Oleksandra Korashvili (Italy) Gaia Parravicini	3–6, 7–5, [10–8]
Loss	4–1	Aug 2023	ITF Vigo, Spain	W25	Hard	(Lithuania) Patricija Paukštytė	(Bosnia and Herzegovina) Nefisa Berberović (United Kingdom) Sarah Beth Grey	3–6, 6–4, [9–11]
Loss	4–2	Oct 2023	ITF Santa Margherita di Pula, Italy	W25	Clay	(Italy) Virginia Ferrara	(Italy) Eleonora Alvisi (Italy) Nuria Brancaccio	2–6, 6–2, [6–10]
Win	5–2	Nov 2023	ITF Ortisei, Italy	W25	Hard (i)	(Latvia) Kamilla Bartone	(Netherlands) Indy de Vroome (Serbia) Katarina Kozarov	6–4, 6–2
Loss	5–3	Apr 2024	ITF Santa Margherita di Pula	W35	Clay	(Netherlands) Eva Vedder	(Poland) Martyna Kubka (Greece) Sapfo Sakellaridi	3–6, 6–3, [6–10]
Win	6–3	Aug 2024	ITF Trieste, Italy	W35	Clay	(Bosnia and Herzegovina) Anita Wagner	(Slovenia) Živa Falkner (Hungary) Amarissa Tóth	6–3, 4–6, [11–9]
Win	7–3	Oct 2024	ITF Santa Margherita di Pula, Italy	W35	Clay	(Italy) Miriana Tona	(United States) Jaeda Daniel (Burundi) Sada Nahimana	6–7^{(3)}, 6–3, [12–10]
Win	8–3	Jan 2025	ITF Buenos Aires, Argentina	W35	Clay	(Italy) Nicole Fossa Huergo	(Italy) Silvia Ambrosio (Italy) Verena Meliss	3–6, 6–4, [10–8]
Loss	8–4	Feb 2025	ITF Manacor, Spain	W15	Hard	(Luxembourg) Marie Weckerle	(Netherlands) Loes Ebeling Koning (Netherlands) Sarah van Emst	4–6, 6–4, [6–10]
Loss	8–5	Jun 2025	ITF Klagenfurt, Austria	W35	Clay	Daria Lodikova	(Czech Republic) Aneta Laboutková (Czech Republic) Julie Štruplová	6–4, 6–7^{(4)}, [9–11]
Win	9–5	Jul 2025	ITF Knokke-Heist, Belgium	W35	Clay	(Greece) Despina Papamichail	(France) Yara Bartashevich (Netherlands) Sarah van Emst	7–5, 6–1
Loss	9–6	Aug 2025	ITF Koksijde, Belgium	W50	Clay	(Croatia) Mariana Dražić	(Belgium) Magali Kempen (Czech Republic) Anna Sisková	6–7^{(5)}, 7–5, [6–10]
Loss	9–7	Sep 2025	ITF Punta Cana, Dominican Republic	W35	Carpet	(Netherlands) Stéphanie Visscher	(Poland) Weronika Falkowska (Germany) Katharina Hobgarski	2–6, 5–7
Win	10–7	Oct 2025	ITF Seville, Spain	W35	Clay	(Italy) Federica Urgesi	(Spain) María Martínez Vaquero (Spain) Alba Rey García	6–4, 6–4
Loss	10–8	Nov 2025	ITF Monastir, Tunisia	W35	Hard	(Bulgaria) Isabella Shinikova	(United States) Kailey Evans (United States) Jordyn McBridea	3–6, 2–6
Win	11–8	Feb 2026	ITF Las Vegas, United States	W35	Hard	(United States) Haley Giavara	(Mexico) Jessica Hinojosa Gómez (Ecuador) Mell Reasco	6–3, 4–6, [10–8]
Win	12–8	Jun 2026	ITF San Gregorio, Italy	W35	Clay	(Argentina) Paula Ormaechea	(Belgium) Ema Kovacevic (Italy) Carolina Troiano	6–3, 6–7^{(3)}, [10–7]
