= 2026 Cary Tennis Classic – Women's doubles =

Women's doubles
- 2026 Cary Tennis Classic

Final
- Champions: (United States) Catherine Harrison (United States) Dalayna Hewitt
- Runners-up: (Japan) Hiroko Kuwata (India) Ankita Raina
- Score: 6–4, 6–2

Events
| Singles | men | women |
| Doubles | men | women |
- Cary Tennis Classic

Catherine Harrison and Dalayna Hewitt won the title, defeating Hiroko Kuwata and Ankita Raina 6–4, 6–2 in the final.

Ayana Akli and Abigail Rencheli were the defending champions, but chose to compete with different partners this year. Akli partnered Mell Reasco, but lost in the quarterfinals to Harrison and Hewitt. Rencheli partnered Savannah Broadus, but lost in the quarterfinals to Reese Brantmeier and Alanis Hamilton.

== Seeds ==
1. (Japan) Momoko Kobori / (Thailand) Peangtarn Plipuech (first round)
2. (United States) Catherine Harrison / (United States) Dalayna Hewitt (champions)
3. (United States) Anna Rogers / (United States) Allura Zamarripa (semifinals)
4. (Japan) Hiroko Kuwata / (India) Ankita Raina (final)

== Draw ==
Key

- Q = Qualifier
- WC = Wild card
- LL = Lucky loser
- Alt = Alternate
- ITF = ITF entry
- PR = Protected ranking
- SR = Special ranking
- SE = Special exempt
- JE = Junior exempt
- JR = Junior Accelerator Programme entrant
- CO = College Accelerator Programme entrant
- NG = Next Gen Accelerator Program entrant
- w/o = Walkover
- r = Retired
- d = Defaulted

First round
1 | (Japan) M Kobori (Thailand) P Plipuech | 3 | 7^{7} | [7]
(United States) S Broadus (United States) A Rencheli | 6 | 6^{3} | [10]
WC | (United States) R Brantmeier (United States) A Hamilton | 6 | 6
(Australia) T McGiffin (United States) K Scott | 1 | 1
4 | (Japan) H Kuwata (India) A Raina | 6 | 6
Alt | (United States) S Maltby (United States) M Zampardo | 4 | 3
(United States) O Lincer; E Ovcharenko | 7 | 1 | [10]
WC | (South Africa) G Broadfoot (United States) V Osuigwe | 5 | 6 | [3]
WC | (United States) B Payne (United States) S Shumate | 4 | 0
(Canada) A Arseneault (Canada) R Lacasse | 6 | 6
(United States) W Osuigwe (United States) A Smith | 4 | 4
3 | (United States) A Rogers (United States) A Zamarripa | 6 | 6
(United States) A Akli (Ecuador) M Reasco | 6 | 6
(India) P Thombare (India) S Yamalapalli | 2 | 3
(China) Y Ma (Japan) M Yamaguchi
2 | (United States) C Harrison (United States) D Hewitt | w/o

Quarterfinals
(United States) S Broadus (United States) A Rencheli | 4 | 4
WC | (United States) R Brantmeier (United States) A Hamilton | 6 | 6
4 | (Japan) H Kuwata (India) A Raina | 6 | 2 | [10]
(United States) O Lincer; E Ovcharenko | 2 | 6 | [6]
(Canada) A Arseneault (Canada) R Lacasse | 4 | 5
3 | (United States) A Rogers (United States) A Zamarripa | 6 | 7
(United States) A Akli (Ecuador) M Reasco | 6^{8} | 1
2 | (United States) C Harrison (United States) D Hewitt | 7^{10} | 6

Semifinals
WC | (United States) R Brantmeier (United States) A Hamilton | 3 | 6 | [7]
4 | (Japan) H Kuwata (India) A Raina | 6 | 1 | [10]
3 | (United States) A Rogers (United States) A Zamarripa | 7 | 4 | [10]
2 | (United States) C Harrison (United States) D Hewitt | 5 | 6 | [12]

Final
4 | (Japan) H Kuwata (India) A Raina | 4 | 2
2 | (United States) C Harrison (United States) D Hewitt | 6 | 6
