= 2026 Palmetto Pro Open – Doubles =

Doubles
- 2026 Palmetto Pro Open

Final
- Champions: (United States) Catherine Harrison (Australia) Alexandra Osborne
- Runners-up: (United States) Anna Rogers (United States) Allura Zamarripa
- Score: 6–4, 4–6, [10–7]

Events
Singles	Doubles
- Palmetto Pro Open

Tara Moore and Abigail Rencheli were the defending champions but chose not to participate.

Catherine Harrison and Alexandra Osborne won the title, defeating Anna Rogers and Allura Zamarripa 6–4, 4–6, [10–7] in the final.

== Seeds ==
1. (United States) Anna Rogers / (United States) Allura Zamarripa (final)
2. (United States) Catherine Harrison / (Australia) Alexandra Osborne (champions)
3. (Spain) Alicia Herrero Liñana / (Ecuador) Mell Reasco (first round)
4. (Lithuania) Justina Mikulskytė / (Poland) Zuzanna Pawlikowska (semifinals)

== Draw ==
Key

- Q = Qualifier
- WC = Wild card
- LL = Lucky loser
- Alt = Alternate
- ITF = ITF entry
- PR = Protected ranking
- SR = Special ranking
- SE = Special exempt
- JE = Junior exempt
- JR = Junior Accelerator Programme entrant
- CO = College Accelerator Programme entrant
- NG = Next Gen Accelerator Program entrant
- w/o = Walkover
- r = Retired
- d = Defaulted

=== Draw ===
First round
1	(United States) A Rogers (United States) A Zamarripa	7^{8}	6
Alt	(Romania) E-T Cadar (Georgia (country)) S Shapatava	6^{6}	1
WC	(United States) B Payne (United States) S Shumate	2	6	[12]
(Slovakia) M Okáľová (United States) K Scott	6	2	[10]
3	(Spain) A Herrero Liñana (Ecuador) M Reasco	4	4
WC	(United States) K Collins (Ukraine) A Sahdiieva	6	6
(United States) V Osuigwe (United States) A Smith	6	6
(United States) E Cayetano (United States) V Hu	4	3
WC	(United States) A Goncharova (United States) M Tattini	6	6
(United States) M Rapolu (India) S Yamalapalli	3	4
(United States) C Ansari (Israel) L Glushko	1	6	[3]
4	(Lithuania) J Mikulskytė (Poland) Z Pawlikowska	6	3	[10]
(United States) O Lincer (Mexico) AS Sánchez	2	4
WC	(United States) S Maltby (United States) M Zampardo	6	6
(United States) H Giavara; K Liutova	4	6^{8}
2	(United States) C Harrison (Australia) A Osborne	6	7^{10}

Quarterfinals
1	(United States) A Rogers (United States) A Zamarripa	7	7^{8}
WC	(United States) B Payne (United States) S Shumate	5	6^{6}
(United States) K Collins (Ukraine) A Sahdiieva	6	5	[3]
(United States) V Osuigwe (United States) A Smith	2	7	[10]
WC	(United States) A Goncharova (United States) M Tattini	4	1
4	(Lithuania) J Mikulskytė (Poland) Z Pawlikowska	6	6
WC	(United States) S Maltby (United States) M Zampardo	5	6	[4]
2	(United States) C Harrison (Australia) A Osborne	7	3	[10]

Semifinals
1	(United States) A Rogers (United States) A Zamarripa	7^{7}	4	[10]
(United States) V Osuigwe (United States) A Smith	6^{3}	6	[5]
4	(Lithuania) J Mikulskytė (Poland) Z Pawlikowska	3	3
2	(United States) C Harrison (Australia) A Osborne	6	6

Final
1	(United States) A Rogers (United States) A Zamarripa	4	6	[7]
2	(United States) C Harrison (Australia) A Osborne	6	4	[10]
