= 2026 W50 Orlando USTA Pro Circuit Event – Doubles =

Tennis tournament in Florida, US

Doubles
- 2026 W50 Orlando USTA Pro Circuit Event

Final
- Champions: (Bulgaria) Lia Karatancheva (Ukraine) Anita Sahdiieva
- Runners-up: (Brazil) Thaisa Grana Pedretti (Bolivia) Noelia Zeballos Melgar
- Score: 6–3, 6–4

Events
Singles	Doubles
- W50 Orlando USTA Pro Circuit Event

The 2026 W50 Orlando USTA Pro Circuit Event – Doubles was played on outdoor hard courts at the USTA National Campus in Orlando, Florida, United States from February 2–8, 2026.

Lia Karatancheva and Anita Sahdiieva won the title, defeating Thaisa Grana Pedretti and Noelia Zeballos Melgar in the final, 6–3, 6–4.

== Seeds ==
1. (Spain) Alicia Herrero Linana / (Ukraine) Valeriya Strakhova (first round)
2. (United States) Anna Rogers / (United States) Alana Smith (semifinals)
3. (Argentina) Maria Lourdes Carle / (Argentina) Julia Riera (first round)
4. (Bulgaria) Lia Karatancheva / (Ukraine) Anita Sahdiieva (champions)

== Draw ==
Key

- Q = Qualifier
- WC = Wild card
- LL = Lucky loser
- Alt = Alternate
- ITF = ITF entry
- PR = Protected ranking
- SR = Special ranking
- SE = Special exempt
- JE = Junior exempt
- JR = Junior Accelerator Programme entrant
- CO = College Accelerator Programme entrant
- NG = Next Gen Accelerator Program entrant
- w/o = Walkover
- r = Retired
- d = Defaulted

First round
1	(Spain) Alicia Herrero Linana (Ukraine) Valeriya Strakhova	2	4
(Brazil) Thaisa Grana Pedretti (Bolivia) Noelia Zeballos Melgar	6	6
(Mexico) Maria Fernanda Navarro (Mexico) Victoria Rodriguez	6	3	[10]
(United States) Samantha Alicea (United States) Malkia Ngounoue	2	6	[7]
3	(Argentina) Maria Lourdes Carle (Argentina) Julia Riera	2	2
(United States) Kylie Collins (United States) Allura Zamarripa	6	6
(China) Yiming Dang (China) Xiaodi You	4	3
(Italy) Jessica Pieri (Italy) Tatiana Pieri	6	6
(Venezuela) Sofia Elena Cabezas Dominguez (United States) Haley Giavara	6	3	[7]
(Bosnia and Herzegovina) Ema Burgić; Olga Govortsova	4	6	[10]
(Argentina) Martina Capurro Taborda (Mexico) Marian Gomez Pezuela Cano	1	6	[7]
4	(Bulgaria) Lia Karatancheva (Ukraine) Anita Sahdiieva	6	2	[10]
(Morocco) Diae El Jardi (Canada) Alexandra Vagramov	6	6
(United States) Bella Payne (United States) Sara Shumate	3	2
(Greece) Martha Matoula (Slovakia) Martina Okalova	6	6^{3}	[4]
2	(United States) Anna Rogers (United States) Alana Smith	4	7^{7}	[10]

Quarterfinals
(Brazil) TG Pedretti (Bolivia) N Zeballos Melgar	6	6
(Mexico) MF Navarro (Mexico) V Rodriguez	4	4
(United States) K Collins (United States) A Zamarripa	w/o
(Italy) J Pieri (Italy) T Pieri
(Bosnia and Herzegovina) E Burgić; O Govortsova
4	(Bulgaria) Lia Karatancheva (Ukraine) Anita Sahdiieva	w/o
(Morocco) D El Jardi (Canada) A Vagramov	6^{6}	2
2	(United States) A Rogers (United States) A Smith	7^{8}	6

Semifinals
(Brazil) TG Pedretti (Bolivia) N Zeballos Melgar	6	6
(United States) K Collins (United States) A Zamarripa	2	3
4	(Bulgaria) Lia Karatancheva (Ukraine) Anita Sahdiieva	3	6	[10]
2	(United States) A Rogers (United States) A Smith	6	4	[6]

Final
(Brazil) TG Pedretti (Bolivia) N Zeballos Melgar	3	4
4	(Bulgaria) Lia Karatancheva (Ukraine) Anita Sahdiieva	6	6
