= 2026 Cary Tennis Classic =

- Date: June 29 – July 5
- Edition: 14th (men); 3rd (women)
- Category: ATP Challenger Tour; ITF Women's World Tennis Tour
- Surface: Hard / Outdoor
- Location: Cary, United States

Champions

Men's singles
- (United States) Braden Shick

Women's singles
- (Italy) Lucrezia Stefanini

Men's doubles
- (South Korea) Nam Ji-sung / (Finland) Patrik Niklas-Salminen

Women's doubles
- (United States) Catherine Harrison / (United States) Dalayna Hewitt
- Cary Tennis Classic

The 2026 Cary Tennis Classic was a professional tennis tournament played on outdoor hard courts. It was the 14th edition of the tournament, which was part of the 2026 ATP Challenger Tour, and the third edition of the tournament, which was part of the 2026 ITF Women's World Tennis Tour. It took place in Cary, North Carolina, United States between June 29 and July 5, 2026.

== Champions ==
=== Men's singles ===
- (United States) Braden Shick def. (France) Timo Legout 4–6, 7–5, 6–3.

=== Women's singles ===
- (Italy) Lucrezia Stefanini def. (United States) Savannah Broadus 6–3, 6–2

=== Men's doubles ===
- (South Korea) Nam Ji-sung / (Finland) Patrik Niklas-Salminen def. (New Zealand) Finn Reynolds / (New Zealand) James Watt 5–7, 7–5, [10–8].

=== Women's doubles ===
- (United States) Catherine Harrison / (United States) Dalayna Hewitt def. (Japan) Hiroko Kuwata / (India) Ankita Raina 6–4, 6–2

== Men's singles main-draw entrants ==
=== Seeds ===
Country	Player	Rank^{1}	Seed
JPN	Rei Sakamoto	148	1
CAN	Liam Draxl	158	2
EST	Daniil Glinka	171	3
~~AUS~~	~~Bernard Tomic~~	~~189~~	~~4~~
USA	Michael Mmoh	194	5
ARG	Juan Pablo Ficovich	198	6
GBR	Liam Broady	210	7
JPN	Rio Noguchi	214	8

- ^{1} Rankings are as of June 22, 2026.

=== Other entrants ===
The following players received wildcards into the singles main draw:

- (France) Jules Leroux
- (United States) William Manning
- (United States) J. J. Wolf

The following players received entry into the singles main draw using protected rankings:

- (Australia) Blake Ellis
- (United States) Aidan Mayo

The following player received entry into the singles main draw through the College Accelerator programme:

- (France) Timo Legout

The following player received entry into the singles main draw through the Next Gen Accelerator programme:

- (United States) Jack Kennedy

The following player received entry into the singles main draw as an alternate:

- (Japan) Hayato Matsuoka

The following players received entry from the qualifying draw:

- (United States) Ozan Baris
- (United States) Andrew Fenty
- (Japan) Jay Friend
- (Japan) Yuta Shimizu
- (India) Dhakshineswar Suresh
- (Australia) Edward Winter

The following player received entry as a lucky loser:

- (Canada) Justin Boulais

== Women's main draw entrants ==
=== Seeds ===
Country	Player	Rank^{1}	Seed
USA	Elvina Kalieva	137	1
ITA	Lucrezia Stefanini	163	2
USA	Whitney Osuigwe	183	3
CHN	Ma Yexin	189	4
CAN	Cadence Brace	217	5
USA	Madison Brengle	224	6
	Kristina Liutova	236	7
CHN	Tian Fangran	249	8

- ^{1} Rankings are as of June 22, 2026.

=== Other entrants ===
The following players received wildcards into the singles main draw:

- (United States) Reese Brantmeier
- (United States) Elvina Kalieva
- (United States) Victoria Osuigwe
- (United States) Mia Slama

The following players received entry from the qualifying draw:

- (United States) Savannah Broadus
- (United States) Kylie Collins
- (United States) Tatum Evans
- (United States) Maya Iyengar
- (United Kingdom) Sofia Johnson
- (Japan) Ena Koike
- (Canada) Raphaëlle Lacasse
- (United States) Malaika Rapolu
