= 2026 Palmetto Pro Open – Singles =

Singles
- 2026 Palmetto Pro Open

Final
- Champion: Kristina Liutova
- Runner-up: (United States) Reese Brantmeier
- Score: 6–4, 6–3

Events
| Singles | Doubles |
- Palmetto Pro Open

Darja Viďmanová was the defending champion, but chose not to participate.

Kristina Liutova won the title, defeating Reese Brantmeier in the final, 6–4, 6–3.

== Seeds ==
1. (United States) Whitney Osuigwe (semifinals)
2. (Canada) Cadence Brace (semifinals)
3. (Lithuania) Justina Mikulskytė (first round)
4. (United States) Madison Brengle (second round)
5. (United States) Katrina Scott (second round)
6. (Mexico) Ana Sofía Sánchez (first round)
7. (United States) Carolyn Ansari (second round)
8. (United States) Anna Rogers (first round)

== Draw ==
Key

- Q = Qualifier
- WC = Wild card
- LL = Lucky loser
- Alt = Alternate
- ITF = ITF entry
- PR = Protected ranking
- SR = Special ranking
- SE = Special exempt
- JE = Junior exempt
- JR = Junior Accelerator Programme entrant
- CO = College Accelerator Programme entrant
- NG = Next Gen Accelerator Program entrant
- w/o = Walkover
- r = Retired
- d = Defaulted

=== Finals ===
Semifinals
1 | (United States) Whitney Osuigwe | 2 | 4
Kristina Liutova | 6 | 6
WC | (United States) Reese Brantmeier | 7^{7} | 2 | 6
2 | (Canada) Cadence Brace | 6^{5} | 6 | 3

Final
Kristina Liutova | 6 | 6
WC | (United States) Reese Brantmeier | 4 | 3

=== Top half ===
First round
1 | (United States) W Osuigwe | 4 | 6 | 6
Q | (Japan) E Koike | 6 | 2 | 2
(United States) L Ma | 6 | 2 | 6
Q | (Israel) L Glushko | 4 | 6 | 1
WC | (United States) B Payne | 6 | 6
Q | (United States) A Bowers | 2 | 1
(Ecuador) M Reasco | 6 | 6
8 | (United States) A Rogers | 4 | 3
4 | (United States) M Brengle | 6 | 6
(United States) H Giavara | 3 | 2
(United States) E Cayetano | 7 | 6
Q | (United Kingdom) S Johnson | 5 | 4
K Liutova | 6 | 6
(United States) C Ngounoue | 1 | 1
(United States) A Smith | 5 | 3
7 | (United States) C Ansari | 7 | 6

Second round
1 | (United States) W Osuigwe | 7 | 6
(United States) L Ma | 5 | 2
WC | (United States) B Payne | 2 | 3
(Ecuador) M Reasco | 6 | 6
4 | (United States) M Brengle | 3 | 6 | 4
(United States) E Cayetano | 6 | 1 | 6
K Liutova | 6 | 6
7 | (United States) C Ansari | 2 | 1

Quarterfinals
1 | (United States) W Osuigwe | 6 | 6
(Ecuador) M Reasco | 4 | 4
(United States) E Cayetano | 6^{2} | 5
K Liutova | 7^{7} | 7

Semifinals
1 | (United States) W Osuigwe | 2 | 4
K Liutova | 6 | 6

=== Bottom half ===
First round
5 | (United States) K Scott | 7^{7} | 6
(Poland) Z Pawlikowska | 6^{2} | 4
(United States) M Sieg | 1 | 3
WC | (United States) R Brantmeier | 6 | 6
(Georgia (country)) S Shapatava | 7 | 2 | 1
Q | (United States) K Collins | 5 | 6 | 6
(Spain) A Herrero Liñana | 6 | 2 | 7
3 | (Lithuania) J Mikulskytė | 1 | 6 | 5
6 | (Mexico) AS Sánchez | 3 | 2
WC | (United States) M Rapolu | 6 | 6
Q | M Sholokhova | 6 | 2 | 6
(United States) V Hu | 4 | 6 | 1
Q | (Slovakia) M Okáľová | 3 | 7^{7} | 7
(India) S Yamalapalli | 6 | 6^{4} | 5
Q | E Khayrutdinova | 1 | 1
2 | (Canada) C Brace | 6 | 6

Second round
5 | (United States) K Scott | 2 | 2
WC | (United States) R Brantmeier | 6 | 6
Q | (United States) K Collins | 5 | 6 | 6
(Spain) A Herrero Liñana | 7 | 2 | 4
WC | (United States) M Rapolu | 7^{7} | 1 | 4
Q | M Sholokhova | 6^{5} | 6 | 1^{r}
Q | (Slovakia) M Okáľová | 7^{7} | 1 | 1
2 | (Canada) C Brace | 6^{5} | 6 | 6

Quarterfinals
WC | (United States) R Brantmeier | 6 | 7
Q | (United States) K Collins | 2 | 5
WC | (United States) M Rapolu | 0 | 5
2 | (Canada) C Brace | 6 | 7

Semifinals
WC | (United States) R Brantmeier | 7^{7} | 2 | 6
2 | (Canada) C Brace | 6^{5} | 6 | 3
