= 2026 Palmetto Pro Open =

Tennis tournament

- Date: 1–7 June 2026
- Edition: 18th
- Category: ITF Women's World Tennis Tour
- Prize money: $100,000
- Surface: Hard / Outdoor
- Location: Sumter, South Carolina, United States

Champions

Singles
- Kristina Liutova

Doubles
- (United States) Catherine Harrison / (Australia) Alexandra Osborne
- Palmetto Pro Open

The 2026 Palmetto Pro Open is a professional tennis tournament played on outdoor hard courts. It is the eighteenth edition of the tournament, which is part of the 2026 ITF Women's World Tennis Tour. It takes place in Sumter, South Carolina, United States, between 1 and 7 June 2026. This year the tournament was upgraded to a $100,000 event.

== Champions ==
=== Singles ===
- Kristina Liutova def. (United States) Reese Brantmeier, 6–4, 6–3.

=== Doubles ===
- (United States) Catherine Harrison / (Australia) Alexandra Osborne def. (United States) Anna Rogers / (United States) Allura Zamarripa, 6–4, 4–6, [10–7].

== Singles main draw entrants ==
=== Seeds ===
Country	Player	Rank	Seed
USA	Whitney Osuigwe	195	1
CAN	Cadence Brace	202	2
LTU	Justina Mikulskytė	219	3
USA	Madison Brengle	241	4
USA	Katrina Scott	250	5
MEX	Ana Sofía Sánchez	253	6
USA	Carolyn Ansari	254	7
USA	Anna Rogers	305	8

- Rankings are as of 25 May 2026.

=== Other entrants ===
The following players received wildcards into the singles main draw:

- (United States) Reese Brantmeier
- (United States) Bella Payne
- (United States) Malaika Rapolu

The following players received entry from the qualifying draw:

- (United States) Ashton Bowers
- (United States) Kylie Collins
- (Israel) Lina Glushko
- (United Kingdom) Sofia Johnson
- Ekaterina Khayrutdinova
- (Japan) Ena Koike
- (Slovakia) Martina Okáľová
- Maria Sholokhova
