= Timo Legout =

French tennis player (born 2002)

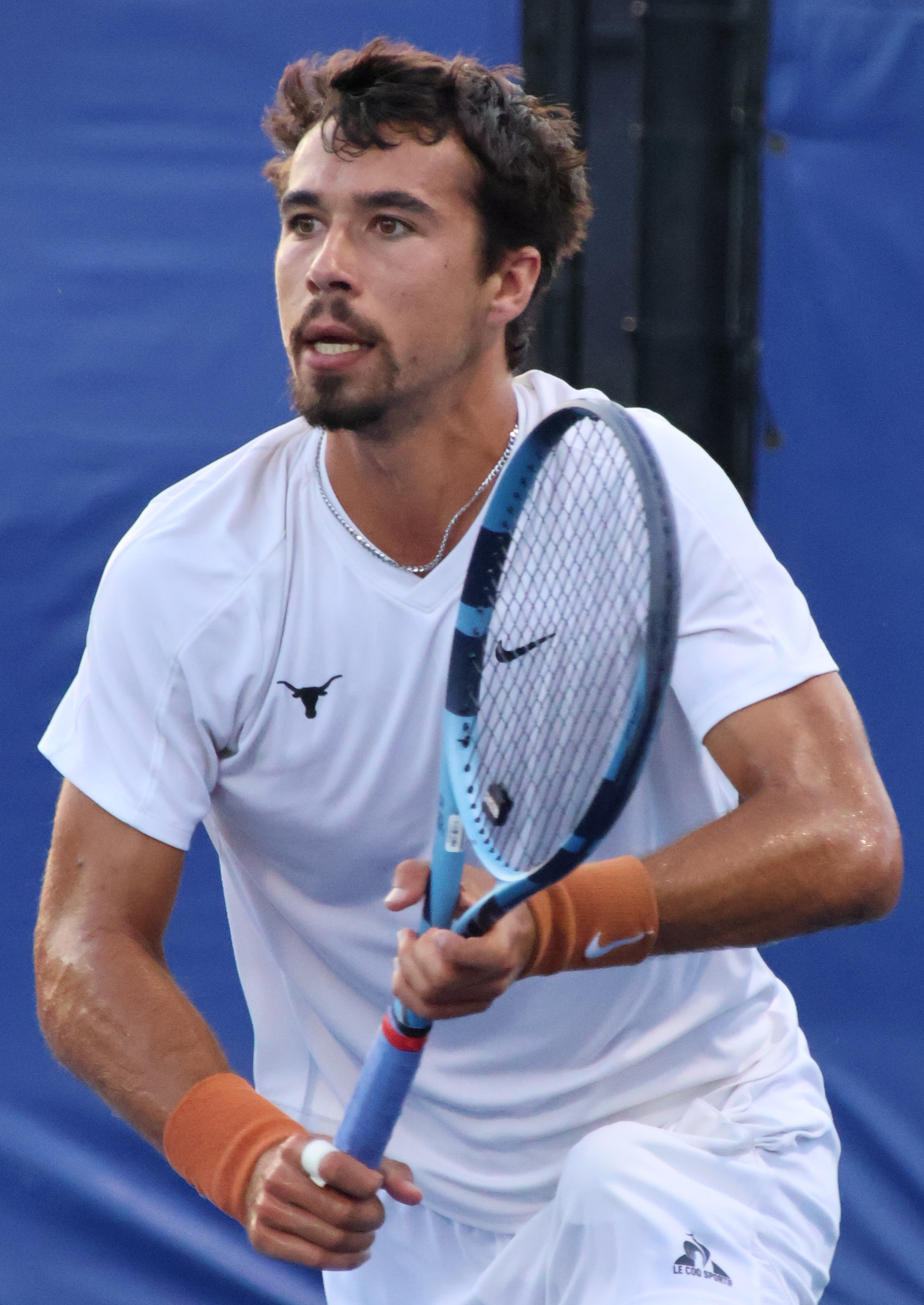
- Legout in 2026
- Country (sports): France
- Born: 13 March 2002 (age 24) Nogent-sur-Marne, France
- Height: 1.80 m (5 ft 11 in)
- Plays: Right-handed (two-handed backhand)
- Coach: Kevin Mercier
- Prize money: US $102,974

Singles
- Career record: 0–0 (at ATP Tour level, Grand Slam level, and in Davis Cup)
- Career titles: 0
- Highest ranking: No. 334 (16 November 2026)
- Current ranking: No. 334 (16 November 2026)

Doubles
- Career record: 1-1 (at ATP Tour level, Grand Slam level, and in Davis Cup)
- Career titles: 0
- Highest ranking: No. 647 (25 July 2022)
- Current ranking: No. 1,995 (16 November 2026)
- Last updated on: 16 November 2026.

Timo Legout (born 13 March 2002) is a French tennis player. He has a career high ATP singles ranking of No. 334 achieved on 16 November 2026 and a career high ATP doubles ranking of No. 647 achieved on 25 July 2022.

Legout made his ATP main draw debut at the 2022 Open 13 after receiving a wildcard into the doubles main draw with Ugo Blanchet.

== ATP Challenger and ITF World Tennis Tour finals ==
=== Singles: 10 (3–7) ===
Legend ATP Challenger (0–1) ITF World Tennis Tour (3–6)	Finals by surface Hard (0–5) Clay (3–2) Grass (0–0)

Result	W–L	Date	Tournament	Tier	Surface	Opponent	Score
Win	1–0	May 2021	M15 Šibenik, Croatia	World Tennis Tour	Clay	(Argentina) Hernán Casanova	6–4, 0–6, 6–2
Win	2–0	Jun 2022	M25 Montauban, France	World Tennis Tour	Clay	(France) Giovanni Mpetshi Perricard	6–3, 3–6, 6–4
Loss	2–1	Dec 2022	M15 Sharm El Sheikh, Egypt	World Tennis Tour	Hard	(Italy) Samuel Vincent Ruggeri	5–7, 6–7^{(3–7)}
Loss	2–2	Feb 2023	M15 Grenoble, France	World Tennis Tour	Hard (i)	(France) Tristan Lamasine	3–6, 4–6
Loss	2–3	Feb 2023	M25 Faro, Portugal	World Tennis Tour	Hard	(France) Lucas Poullain	6–7^{(5–7)}, 2–6
Loss	2–4	Apr 2023	M25 Santa Margherita di Pula, Italy	World Tennis Tour	Clay	(Poland) Daniel Michalski	4–6, 3–6
Loss	2–5	Aug 2023	M25 Koksijde, Belgium	World Tennis Tour	Clay	(Netherlands) Guy den Ouden	5–7, 2–6
Loss	2–6	Mar 2024	M25 Bakersfield, United States	World Tennis Tour	Hard	(United States) Brandon Holt	4–6, 4–6
Win	3–6	Jul 2024	M15 Bastia, France	World Tennis Tour	Clay	(France) Louis Dussin	7–6^{(7–4)}, 6–2
Loss	3–7	Jun 2026	Cary Tennis Classic, United States	Challenger	Hard	(United States) Braden Shick	6–4, 5–7, 3–6

=== Doubles: 1 (0–1) ===
Legend ATP Challenger (0–0) ITF World Tennis Tour (0–1)	Finals by surface Hard (0–1) Clay (0–0) Grass (0–0)

Result	W–L	Date	Tournament	Tier	Surface	Partner	Opponents	Score
Loss	0–1	Feb 2022	M15 Monastir, Tunisia	World Tennis Tour	Hard	(France) Martin Breysach	(Belgium) Olivier Rojas (France) Mathieu Scaglia	6-7^{(4–7)}, 0–6
