= DJ Bennett =

American tennis player (born 2003)

- Country (sports): United States
- Born: August 28, 2003 (age 23)
- College: Auburn
- Prize money: $14,524

Singles
- Career record: 32–20
- Career titles: 1 ITF
- Highest ranking: No. 725 (November 27, 2023)

Doubles
- Career record: 6–12
- Career titles: 0
- Highest ranking: No. 890 (August 18, 2025)

Grand Slam doubles results
- US Open: 1R (2026)
- Last updated on: September 3, 2026.

DJ Bennett (born August 28, 2003) is an American tennis player.

She plays college tennis at Auburn. She partnered with Ava Esposito and received a wildcard for the 2026 US Open women's doubles main draw by winning the USTA Collegiate wildcard playoff. They lost to 13th seeds Storm Hunter and Desirae Krawczyk in the first round.
