= 2026 W50 Orlando USTA Pro Circuit Event – Singles =

Singles
- 2026 W50 Orlando USTA Pro Circuit Event

Final
- Champion: (United States) Kayla Day
- Runner-up: (United States) Katrina Scott
- Score: 6–4, 6–2

Events
Singles	Doubles
- W50 Orlando USTA Pro Circuit Event

There were no W50 ITF Women's World Tennis Tour events in Orlando, Florida in 2025.

American Kayla Day won the 2026 title, defeating American Katrina Scott on February 8 at the USTA National Campus.

== Seeds ==
1. (United States) Whitney Osuigwe (first round)
2. (Argentina) Maria Lourdes Carle (second round)
3. (United States) Louisa Chirico (second round)
4. (Argentina) Julia Riera (first round)
5. (Canada) Kayla Cross (semifinals)
6. (Argentina) Jazmin Ortenzi (first round)
7. (United States) Mary Stoiana (quarterfinals)
8. (Italy) Jessica Pieri (first round)

== Draw ==
Key

- Q = Qualifier
- WC = Wild card
- LL = Lucky loser
- Alt = Alternate
- ITF = ITF entry
- PR = Protected ranking
- SR = Special ranking
- SE = Special exempt
- JE = Junior exempt
- JR = Junior Accelerator Programme entrant
- CO = College Accelerator Programme entrant
- NG = Next Gen Accelerator Program entrant
- w/o = Walkover
- r = Retired
- d = Defaulted

=== Finals ===
Semifinals
5	(Canada) Kayla Cross	4	4
(United States) Kayla Day	6	6
WC	(United States) Katrina Scott	6	6
Q	(United States) Eryn Cayetano	0	1

Final
(United States) Kayla Day	6	6
WC	(United States) Katrina Scott	4	2

== Main Draw ==
=== Top half ===
First round
1	(United States) Whitney Osuigwe	6^{5}	6^{4}
WC	(United States) Monika Ekstrand	7^{7}	7^{7}
Q	(Venezuela) Sofia Elena Cabezas Dominguez	6	3	6
(United States) Anna Rogers	2	6	4
(United States) Hanna Chang	6	3	6
WC	(United States) Akasha Urhobo	3	6	4
(Sweden) Kajsa Rinaldo Persson	2	4
5	(Canada) Kayla Cross	6	6
3	(United States) Louisa Chirico	7	6
(Brazil) Carolina Alves	5	3
(United States) Kayla Day	6	6
(Serbia) Katarina Jokic	2	3
Q	(Belgium) Amelie Van Impe	3	6	4
Q	(Bosnia and Herzegovina) Ema Burgić	6	1	6
SR	(United States) Madison Brengle	2	6	4
7	(United States) Mary Stoiana	6	4	6

Second round
WC	(United States) M Ekstrand	6	4	1
Q	(Venezuela) SE Cabezas Dominguez	2	6	6
(United States) H Chang	6	3	6^{4}
5	(Canada) K Cross	4	6	7^{7}
3	(United States) L Chirico	3	1
(United States) K Day	6	6
Q	(Bosnia and Herzegovina) E Burgić	0^{r}
7	(United States) M Stoiana	3

Quarterfinals
Q	(Venezuela) SE Cabezas Dominguez	5	3
5	(Canada) K Cross	7	6
(United States) K Day	6	0	7^{7}
7	(United States) M Stoiana	3	6	6^{4}

Semifinals
5	(Canada) K Cross	4	4
(United States) K Day	6	6

=== Bottom half ===
First round
8	(Italy) Jessica Pieri	5^{r}
WC	(United States) Lea Ma	5
WC	(United States) Katrina Scott	6	6
Q	(United States) Madison Sieg	3	2
Q	(Argentina) Martina Capurro Taborda	6	6
(Bulgaria) Lia Karatancheva	3	2
(United Kingdom) Katie Swan	6	6
4	(Argentina) Julia Riera	4	3
6	(Argentina) Jazmin Ortenzi	4	2^{r}
Q	(United States) Haley Giavara	6	3
(China) Xiaodi You	3	3
Q	(Japan) Ena Koike	6	6
Q	(United States) Eryn Cayetano	6	6
(Romania) Gabriela Lee	1	4
(Spain) Alicia Herrero Linana	6	2	2
2	(Argentina) Maria Lourdes Carle	1	6	6

Second round
WC	(United States) L Ma	3	5
WC	(United States) K Scott	6	7
Q	(Argentina) M Capurro Taborda	2	4
(United Kingdom) K Swan	6	0^{r}
Q	(United States) H Giavara	7	6
Q	(Japan) E Koike	5	2
Q	(United States) E Cayetano	2	6	6
2	(Argentina) ML Carle	6	3	4

Quarterfinals
WC	(United States) K Scott	6	4	6
Q	(Argentina) M Capurro Taborda	2	6	0
Q	(United States) H Giavara	4	2
Q	(United States) E Cayetano	6	6

Semifinals
WC	(United States) K Scott	6	6
Q	(United States) E Cayetano	0	1
