= 2026 Cary Tennis Classic – Women's singles =

Women's singles
- 2026 Cary Tennis Classic

Final
- Champion: (Italy) Lucrezia Stefanini
- Runner-up: (United States) Savannah Broadus
- Score: 6–3, 6–2

Events
Singles	men	women
Doubles	men	women
- Cary Tennis Classic

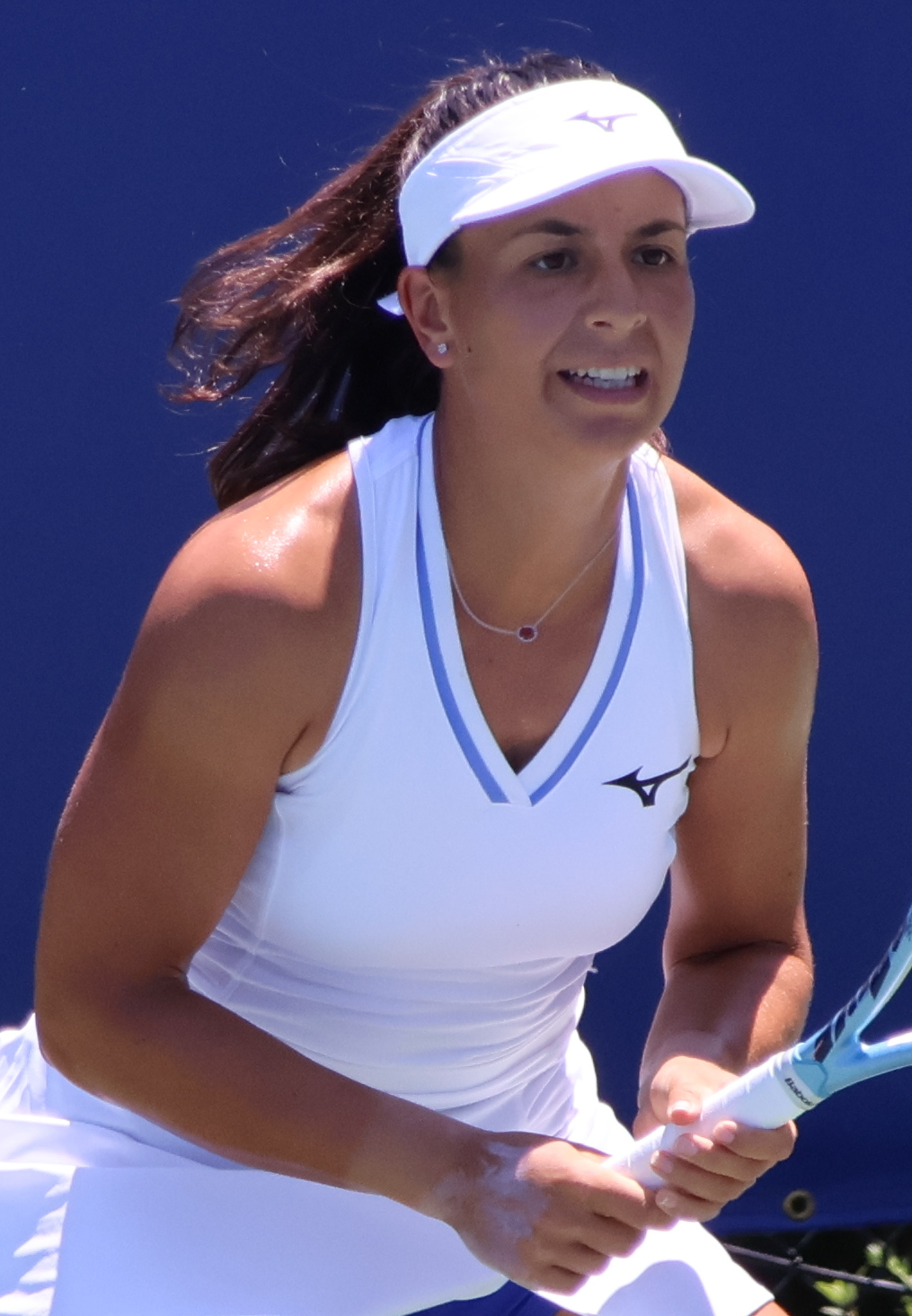
Lucrezia Stefanini won the biggest title of her career to date.

Darja Vidmanova was the defending champion but chose to compete at Wimbledon instead.

Lucrezia Stefanini won the title, defeating Savannah Broadus 6–3, 6–2 in the final.

== Seeds ==
1. (United States) Elvina Kalieva (first round)
2. (Italy) Lucrezia Stefanini (champion)
3. (United States) Whitney Osuigwe (first round)
4. (China) Ma Yexin (semifinals)
5. (Canada) Cadence Brace (second round)
6. (United States) Madison Brengle (second round)
7. Kristina Liutova (quarterfinals)
8. (China) Tian Fangran (second round)

== Draw ==
Key

- Q = Qualifier
- WC = Wild card
- LL = Lucky loser
- Alt = Alternate
- ITF = ITF entry
- PR = Protected ranking
- SR = Special ranking
- SE = Special exempt
- JE = Junior exempt
- JR = Junior Accelerator Programme entrant
- CO = College Accelerator Programme entrant
- NG = Next Gen Accelerator Program entrant
- w/o = Walkover
- r = Retired
- d = Defaulted

=== Finals ===
Semifinals
Q	(United States) Savannah Broadus	7^{7}	6
Q	(Japan) Ena Koike	6^{4}	3
4	(China) Ma Yexin	2	0
2	(Italy) Lucrezia Stefanini	6	6

Final
Q	(United States) Savannah Broadus	3	2
2	(Italy) Lucrezia Stefanini	6	6

=== Top half ===
First round
1/WC	(United States) E Kalieva	4	6	1
(United States) L Ma	6	2	6
(India) S Yamalapalli	3	4
(United States) C Ngounoue	6	6
(United States) K Scott	3	2
Q	(United States) S Broadus	6	6
Q	(United States) K Collins	3	3
8	(China) F Tian	6	6
3	(United States) W Osuigwe	2	6^{3}
(Japan) M Yamaguchi	6	7^{7}
(United States) A Akli	4	6	1^{r}
Q	(Japan) E Koike	6	3	3
(United States) C Ansari	6^{6}	1
Q	(United States) T Evans	7^{8}	6
Q	(United States) M Iyengar	1	3
6	(United States) M Brengle	6	6

Second round
(United States) L Ma	6	2	7
(United States) C Ngounoue	4	6	5
Q	(United States) S Broadus	2	6	7
8	(China) F Tian	6	3	5
(Japan) M Yamaguchi	4	4
Q	(Japan) E Koike	6	6
Q	(United States) T Evans	6	6^{5}	6
6	(United States) M Brengle	2	7^{7}	2

Quarterfinals
(United States) L Ma	6^{3}	6^{6}
Q	(United States) S Broadus	7^{7}	7^{8}
Q	(Japan) E Koike	7	6
Q	(United States) T Evans	5	2

Semifinals
Q	(United States) S Broadus	7^{7}	6
Q	(Japan) E Koike	6^{4}	3

=== Bottom half ===
First round
5	(Canada) C Brace	6	6
Q	(Canada) R Lacasse	3	4
WC	(United States) M Slama	7	4	6
(Mexico) AS Sánchez	5	6	3
WC	(United States) V Osuigwe	6^{4}	0
(Japan) M Kobori	7^{7}	6
WC	(United States) R Brantmeier	2	4
4	(China) Y Ma	6	6
7	K Liutova	6	6
Q	(United States) M Rapolu	1	1
Q	(United Kingdom) S Johnson	6	1	6
(United States) A Rogers	4	6	2
(Japan) H Kaji	6	6
(Canada) R Marino	4	2
(Japan) Y Naito	7^{9}	4	4
2	(Italy) L Stefanini	6^{7}	6	6

Second round
5	(Canada) C Brace	3	3
WC	(United States) M Slama	6	6
(Japan) M Kobori	2	6	6^{1}
4	(China) Y Ma	6	1	7^{7}
7	K Liutova	3	6	6
Q	(United Kingdom) S Johnson	6	3	1
(Japan) H Kaji	3	1
2	(Italy) L Stefanini	6	6

Quarterfinals
WC	(United States) M Slama	4	2
4	(China) Y Ma	6	6
7	K Liutova	2	0
2	(Italy) L Stefanini	6	6

Semifinals
4	(China) Y Ma	2	0
2	(Italy) L Stefanini	6	6
