= 2026 W50 Orlando USTA Pro Circuit Event =

Tennis tournament in Florida, US

- Date: February 2–8, 2026
- Category: ITF Women's World Tennis Tour
- Prize money: $40,000
- Surface: Hard / Outdoor
- Location: Orlando, Florida, United States

Champions

Singles
- (United States) Kayla Day

Doubles
- (Bulgaria) Lia Karatancheva / (Ukraine) Anita Sahdiieva
- W50 Orlando USTA Pro Circuit Event

The 2026 W50 Orlando USTA Pro Circuit Event was a professional tennis tournament on the 2026 ITF Women's World Tennis Tour. It was played on outdoor hard courts at the USTA National Campus in Orlando, Florida, United States from February 2–8, 2026.

== Singles ==
- (United States) Kayla Day def. (United States) Katrina Scott, 6–4, 6–2

== Doubles ==
- (Bulgaria) Lia Karatancheva / (Ukraine) Anita Sahdiieva def. (Brazil) Thaisa Grana Pedretti / (Bolivia) Noelia Zeballos Melgar, 6–3, 6–4

== Singles main draw entrants ==
=== Seeds ===
Country	Player	Rank¹	Seed
USA	Whitney Osuigwe	152	1
ARG	Maria Lourdes Carle	158	2
USA	Louisa Chirico	177	3
ARG	Julia Riera	180	4
CAN	Kayla Cross	198	5
ARG	Jazmin Ortenzi	217	6
USA	Mary Stoiana	221	7
ITA	Jessica Pieri	228	8

- ^{1} Rankings are as of 12 January 2026.

=== Other entrants ===
The following players received wildcards into the singles main draw:

- (United States) Monika Ekstrand
- (Canada) Akasha Urhobo
- (United States) Katrina Scott
- (United States) Lea Ma

The following player received entry into the singles main draw via Special ranking:

- (United States) Madison Brengle

The following players received entry from the qualifying draw:

- (United States) Eryn Cayetano
- (Belgium) Amelie Van Impe
- (United States) Madison Sieg
- (United States) Haley Giavara
- (Bosnia and Herzegovina) Ema Burgić
- (Venezuela) Sofia Elena Cabezas Dominguez
- (Japan) Ena Koike
- (Argentina) Martina Capurro Taborda
