= Braden Shick =

American tennis player (born 2003)

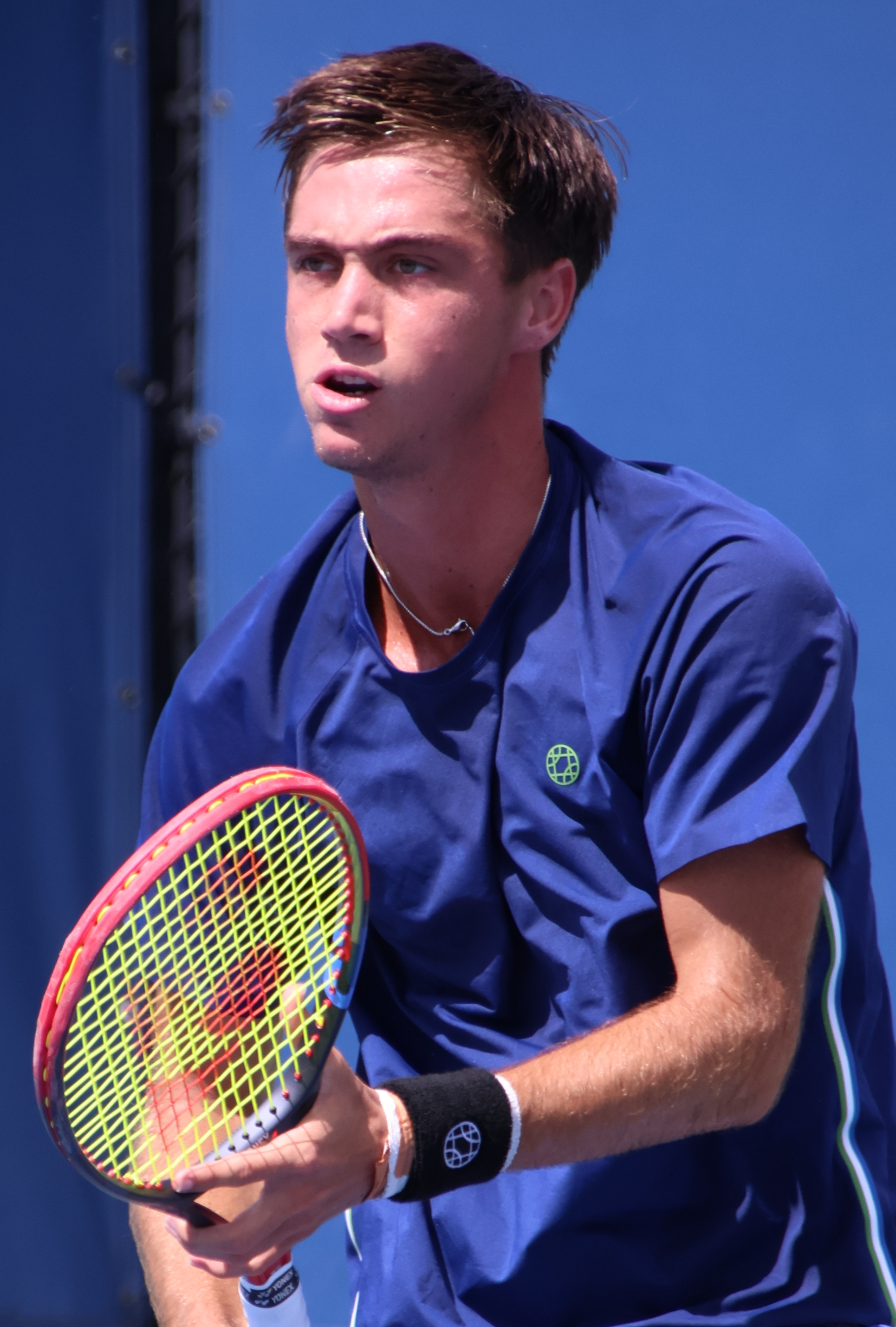
- Shick at the 2026 US Open
- Country (sports): United States
- Born: October 24, 2003 (age 23) Denver, United States
- Height: 6 ft 0 in (1.83 m)
- Plays: Right-handed (two-handed backhand)
- College: NC State
- Coach: Kyle Spencer, Cris James, Tony Mule
- Prize money: US $167,982

Singles
- Career record: 0–0 (at ATP Tour level, Grand Slam level, and in Davis Cup)
- Career titles: 1 ATP Challenger, 6 ITF
- Highest ranking: No. 202 (September 21, 2026)
- Current ranking: No. 202 (November 16, 2026)

Grand Slam singles results
- US Open: Q2 (2026)

Doubles
- Career record: 0–1 (at ATP Tour level, Grand Slam level, and in Davis Cup)
- Career titles: 5 ITF
- Highest ranking: No. 185 (November 16, 2026)
- Current ranking: No. 185 (November 16, 2026)

Grand Slam doubles results
- US Open: 1R (2026)
- Last updated on: November 16, 2026.

Braden Shick (born October 24, 2003) is an American tennis player. Shick has a career-high ATP singles ranking of No. 202 achieved on September 21, 2026 and a career-high ATP doubles ranking of No. 185 achieved on November 16, 2026.

Shick played college tennis at NC State.

== Professional career ==
=== 2026: Maiden Challenger title ===
In July, Shick won his maiden Challenger singles title at the Cary Tennis Classic, defeating Timo Legout in the final.

== ATP Challenger Tour finals ==
=== Singles: 1 (1 title, 0 runner-up) ===
Legend ATP Challenger Tour (1–0)	Finals by surface Hard (1–0) Clay (0–0)

Result	W–L	Date	Tournament	Tier	Surface	Opponent	Score
Win	1–0	Jun 2026	Cary Tennis Classic, United States	Challenger	Hard	(France) Timo Legout	4–6, 7–5, 6–3
