= 2026 Cary Tennis Classic – Men's doubles =

Men's doubles
- 2026 Cary Tennis Classic

Final
- Champions: (South Korea) Nam Ji-sung (Finland) Patrik Niklas-Salminen
- Runners-up: (New Zealand) Finn Reynolds (New Zealand) James Watt
- Score: 5–7, 7–5, [10–8]

Events
Singles	men	women
Doubles	men	women
- Cary Tennis Classic

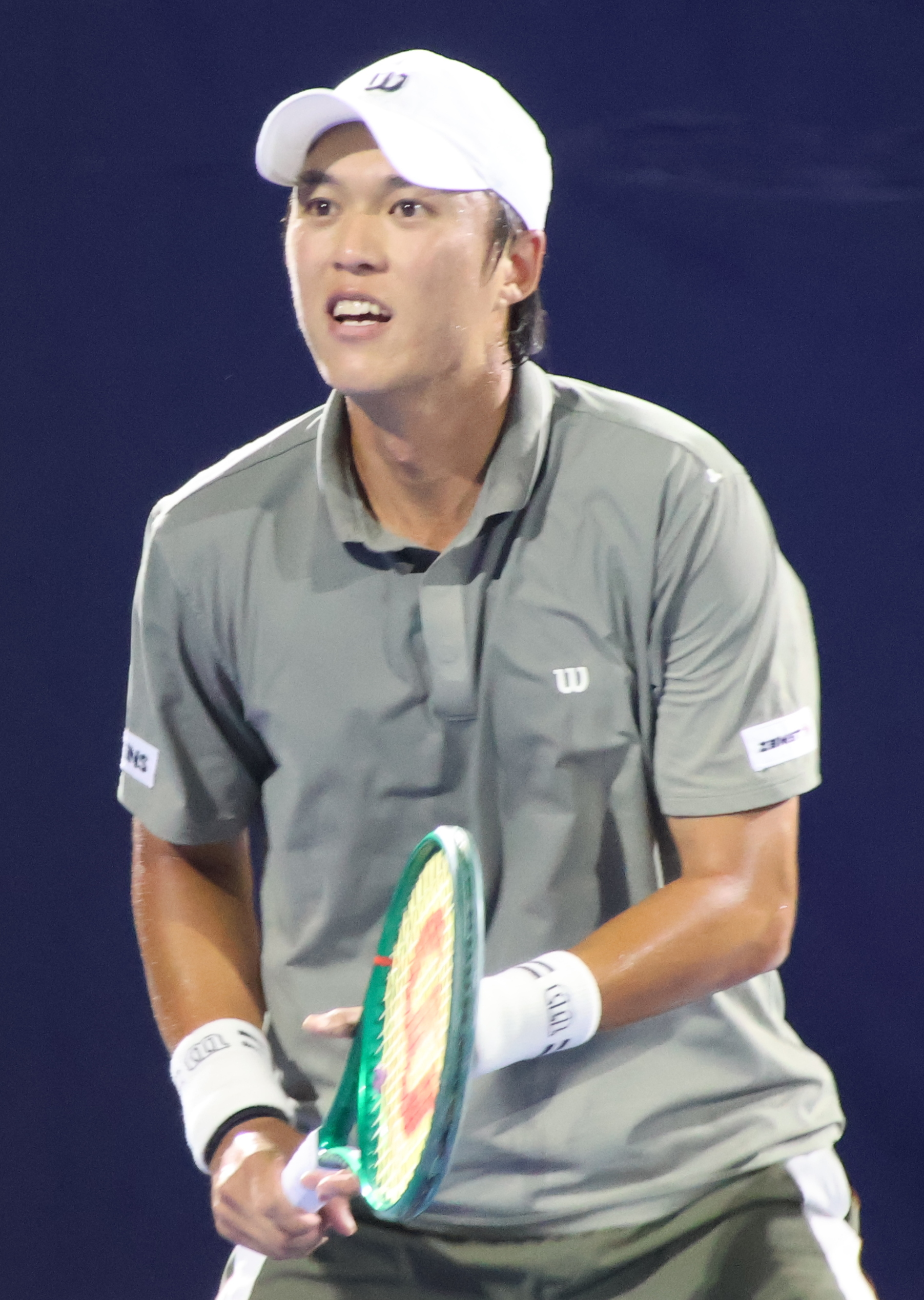
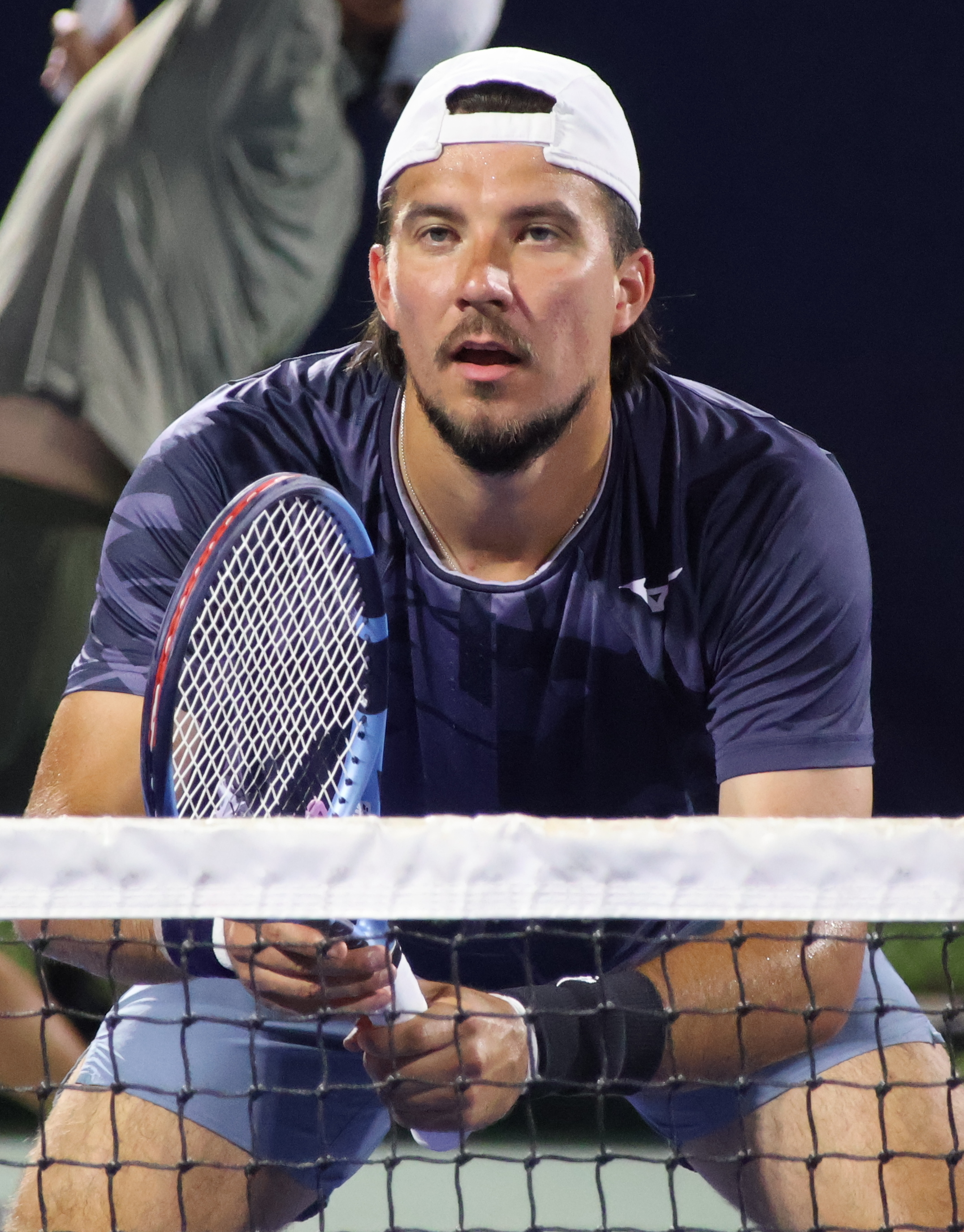
Nam Ji-sung and Patrik Niklas-Salminen won their third title together.

Finn Reynolds and James Watt were the defending champions but lost in the final to Nam Ji-sung and Patrik Niklas-Salminen.

Nam and Niklas-Salminen won the title after defeating Reynolds and Watt 5–7, 7–5, [10–8] in the final.

== Seeds ==
1. (New Zealand) Finn Reynolds / (New Zealand) James Watt (final)
2. (Thailand) Pruchya Isaro / (India) Niki Kaliyanda Poonacha (semifinals)
3. (Australia) Patrick Harper / (United States) Trey Hilderbrand (semifinals)
4. (United States) Nathaniel Lammons / (United States) Jackson Withrow (quarterfinals)

== Draw ==
Key

- Q = Qualifier
- WC = Wild card
- LL = Lucky loser
- Alt = Alternate
- ITF = ITF entry
- PR = Protected ranking
- SR = Special ranking
- SE = Special exempt
- JE = Junior exempt
- JR = Junior Accelerator Programme entrant
- CO = College Accelerator Programme entrant
- NG = Next Gen Accelerator Program entrant
- w/o = Walkover
- r = Retired
- d = Defaulted

First round
1	(New Zealand) F Reynolds (New Zealand) J Watt	6	6
(United States) A Ayeni (Australia) Ethan Cook	3	4
WC	(Australia) Charlie Camus (Lithuania) A Sabaliauskas	6	6
(Australia) K Pearson (Australia) C Puttergill	3	3
3	(Australia) P Harper (United States) T Hilderbrand	6	6
Alt	(Japan) M Imamura (Japan) K Uchida	2	4
(Venezuela) LD Martínez (India) J Nedunchezhiyan	4	6	[18]
(Canada) J Boulais (Antigua and Barbuda) J Maginley	6	4	[20]
(Japan) Y Shimizu (Japan) S Watanabe	7^{7}	2	[6]
(South Korea) J-s Nam (Finland) P Niklas-Salminen	6^{5}	6	[10]
PR	(Australia) B Bayldon (Australia) B Ellis	4	6^{4}
4	(United States) N Lammons (United States) J Withrow	6	7^{7}
(Venezuela) Juan José Bianchi (Canada) C Harper	7^{7}	3	[10]
(United States) D Milavsky (United States) J Sheehy	6^{4}	6	[6]
WC	(France) Jules Leroux (United States) William Manning	5	5
2	(Thailand) P Isaro (India) N Kaliyanda Poonacha	7	7

Quarterfinals
1	(New Zealand) F Reynolds (New Zealand) J Watt	6	6^{5}	[14]
WC	(Australia) C Camus (Lithuania) A Sabaliauskas	3	7^{7}	[12]
3	(Australia) P Harper (United States) T Hilderbrand	6	6
(Canada) J Boulais (Antigua and Barbuda) J Maginley	4	1
(South Korea) J-s Nam (Finland) P Niklas-Salminen	6	6
4	(United States) N Lammons (United States) J Withrow	3	3
(Venezuela) JJ Bianchi (Canada) C Harper	4	7^{8}	[6]
2	(Thailand) P Isaro (India) N Kaliyanda Poonacha	6	6^{6}	[10]

Semifinals
1	(New Zealand) F Reynolds (New Zealand) J Watt	6	7
3	(Australia) P Harper (United States) T Hilderbrand	3	5
(South Korea) J-s Nam (Finland) P Niklas-Salminen	4	7	[11]
2	(Thailand) P Isaro (India) N Kaliyanda Poonacha	6	5	[9]

Final
1	(New Zealand) F Reynolds (New Zealand) J Watt	7	5	[8]
(South Korea) J-s Nam (Finland) P Niklas-Salminen	5	7	[10]
