= Ava Esposito =

American tennis player (born 2005)

- Full name: Ava Esposito Cogan
- Country (sports): United States
- Born: September 10, 2005 (age 20) New Haven, Connecticut, United States
- College: Auburn
- Prize money: $376

Singles
- Career record: 0–1
- Career titles: 0

Doubles
- Career record: 1–2
- Career titles: 0

Grand Slam doubles results
- US Open: 1R (2026)
- Last updated on: September 3, 2026.

Ava Esposito Cogan (born September 10, 2005) is an American tennis player.

She plays college tennis at Auburn. She partnered with DJ Bennett and received a wildcard for the 2026 US Open women's doubles main draw by winning the USTA Collegiate wildcard playoff. They lost to 13th seeds Storm Hunter and Desirae Krawczyk in the first round.
