= 2026 US Open – Women's doubles =

Tennis championship

Women's doubles
- 2026 US Open

Final
- Champions: (Czech Republic) Kateřina Siniaková (United States) Taylor Townsend
- Runners-up: (United States) Ashlyn Krueger (United States) Robin Montgomery
- Score: 5–7, 6–0, 6–2
- Date: September 11, 2026

Details
- Draw: 64
- Seeds: 16

Events
Singles	men	women		boys	girls
Doubles	men	women	mixed	boys	girls
WC Singles	men	women	quad	boys	girls
WC Doubles	men	women	quad	boys	girls
- US Open

Kateřina Siniaková and Taylor Townsend defeated Ashlyn Krueger and Robin Montgomery in the final, 5–7, 6–0, 6–2 to win the women's doubles tennis title at the 2026 US Open. It was Siniaková's twelfth major women's doubles title and Townsend's fourth. With the win, Townsend completed the career Grand Slam in women's doubles, and Siniaková completed the double career Grand Slam. They were also the eighth team to complete the career Grand Slam; Siniaková became the first woman to complete it with two different partners (the other being her former long-time partner, Barbora Krejčíková).

Gabriela Dabrowski and Erin Routliffe were the reigning champions, but chose not to compete together this year. Dabrowski partnered Luisa Stefani but lost in the semifinals to Krueger and Montgomery. Routliffe partnered Aldila Sutjiadi but lost in the quarterfinals to Krueger and Montgomery.

Kristina Mladenovic and Hsieh Su-wei were also vying to complete the career Grand Slam. Mladenovic partnered Guo Hanyu but lost in the first round to Maja Chwalińska and Magda Linette. Hsieh partnered Jeļena Ostapenko but lost in the quarterfinals to Elise Mertens and Diana Shnaider.

== Seeds ==
1. (Czech Republic) Kateřina Siniaková / (United States) Taylor Townsend (champions)
2. (Canada) Gabriela Dabrowski / (Brazil) Luisa Stefani (semifinals)
3. (Kazakhstan) Anna Danilina / (Serbia) Aleksandra Krunić (second round, retired)
4. (Chinese Taipei) Hsieh Su-wei / (Latvia) Jeļena Ostapenko (quarterfinals)
5. (China) Guo Hanyu / (France) Kristina Mladenovic (first round)
6. (Spain) Cristina Bucșa / (United States) Nicole Melichar-Martinez (quarterfinals)
7. (China) Jiang Xinyu / (China) Zhang Shuai (quarterfinals)
8. (Belgium) Elise Mertens / Diana Shnaider (semifinals)
9. (New Zealand) Erin Routliffe / (Indonesia) Aldila Sutjiadi (quarterfinals)
10. (Australia) Ellen Perez / (Netherlands) Demi Schuurs (third round)
11. (Japan) Shuko Aoyama / (Chinese Taipei) Liang En-shuo (first round)
12. (Slovakia) Tereza Mihalíková / (United Kingdom) Olivia Nicholls (first round)
13. (Australia) Storm Hunter / (United States) Desirae Krawczyk (third round)
14. (Chinese Taipei) Chan Hao-ching / (Australia) Maya Joint (third round)
15. (Norway) Ulrikke Eikeri / (United States) Quinn Gleason (first round)
16. (United States) Asia Muhammad / (Hungary) Fanny Stollár (second round)

Click on the seed number of a player to go to their draw section.

== Draw ==
Key

- Q = Qualifier
- WC = Wild card
- LL = Lucky loser
- Alt = Alternate
- ITF = ITF entry
- PR = Protected ranking
- SR = Special ranking
- SE = Special exempt
- JE = Junior exempt
- JR = Junior Accelerator Programme entrant
- CO = College Accelerator Programme entrant
- NG = Next Gen Accelerator Program entrant
- w/o = Walkover
- r = Retired
- d = Defaulted

=== Finals ===
Quarterfinals
1	(Czech Republic) Kateřina Siniaková (United States) Taylor Townsend	6	6
6	(Spain) Cristina Bucșa (United States) Nicole Melichar-Martinez	4	2
4	(Chinese Taipei) Hsieh Su-wei (Latvia) Jeļena Ostapenko	5	3
8	(Belgium) Elise Mertens; Diana Shnaider	7	6
9	(New Zealand) Erin Routliffe (Indonesia) Aldila Sutjiadi	6^{5}	3
WC	(United States) Ashlyn Krueger (United States) Robin Montgomery	7^{7}	6
7	(China) Jiang Xinyu (China) Zhang Shuai	3	4
2	(Canada) Gabriela Dabrowski (Brazil) Luisa Stefani	6	6

Semifinals
1	(Czech Republic) Kateřina Siniaková (United States) Taylor Townsend	6	7^{10}
8	(Belgium) Elise Mertens; Diana Shnaider	0	6^{8}
WC	(United States) Ashlyn Krueger (United States) Robin Montgomery	4	6	7^{10}
2	(Canada) Gabriela Dabrowski (Brazil) Luisa Stefani	6	4	6^{8}

Final
1	(Czech Republic) Kateřina Siniaková (United States) Taylor Townsend	5	6	6
WC	(United States) Ashlyn Krueger (United States) Robin Montgomery	7	0	2

=== Top half ===
==== Section 1 ====
First round
1	(Czech Republic) K Siniaková (United States) T Townsend	6	6
WC	(United States) R Brantmeier (United States) S Broadus	2	4
WC	(United States) C Liu (United States) J Pareja	3	6^{4}
(China) Xiy Wang (China) Y Xu	6	7^{7}
M Kozyreva (Japan) M Ninomiya	4	2
(Belgium) M Kempen; A Panova	6	6
WC	(United States) DJ Bennett (United States) A Esposito	0	3
13	(Australia) S Hunter (United States) D Krawczyk	6	6
11	(Japan) S Aoyama (Chinese Taipei) E-s Liang	1	4
(Estonia) I Neel (Mexico) G Olmos	6	6
(Australia) K Birrell (United States) P Stearns	6	2	3
Alt	(Japan) E Shibahara (Thailand) L Tararudee	3	6	6
(Croatia) P Marčinko (Ukraine) O Oliynykova	5	3
(United Kingdom) H Dart (United Kingdom) M Lumsden	7	6
(Switzerland) V Golubic (Switzerland) S Waltert	3	2
6	(Spain) C Bucșa (United States) N Melichar-Martinez	6	6

Second round
1	(Czech Republic) K Siniaková (United States) T Townsend	6	6
(China) Xiy Wang (China) Y Xu	3	4
(Belgium) M Kempen; A Panova	4	7	4
13	(Australia) S Hunter (United States) D Krawczyk	6	5	6
(Estonia) I Neel (Mexico) G Olmos	6^{5}	6	6
Alt	(Japan) E Shibahara (Thailand) L Tararudee	7^{7}	1	4
(United Kingdom) H Dart (United Kingdom) M Lumsden	2	2
6	(Spain) C Bucșa (United States) N Melichar-Martinez	6	6

Third round
1	(Czech Republic) K Siniaková (United States) T Townsend	7^{8}	6
13	(Australia) S Hunter (United States) D Krawczyk	6^{6}	4
(Estonia) I Neel (Mexico) G Olmos	5	3
6	(Spain) C Bucșa (United States) N Melichar-Martinez	7	6

Quarterfinals
1	(Czech Republic) K Siniaková (United States) T Townsend	6	6
6	(Spain) C Bucșa (United States) N Melichar-Martinez	4	2

==== Section 2 ====
First round
4	(Chinese Taipei) S-w Hsieh (Latvia) J Ostapenko	6	6
PR	(Croatia) D Jurak Schreiber (Croatia) A Ružić	4	3
PR	(Czech Republic) M Bouzková (Spain) S Sorribes Tormo	6	2	6
(United States) M Kessler (United States) C McNally	4	6	1
(Argentina) N Fossa Huergo (Germany) T Korpatsch	4	6	6
(Czech Republic) J Malečková (Czech Republic) M Škoch	6	2	4
WC	(United States) S Williams (United States) V Williams	3	7^{8}	6^{7}
14	(Chinese Taipei) H-c Chan (Australia) M Joint	6	6^{6}	7^{10}
10	(Australia) E Perez (Netherlands) D Schuurs	6	6
A Tikhonova (Mexico) R Zarazúa	1	3
(Poland) K Piter (Czech Republic) A Sisková	3	2
E Pridankina (China) Q Tang	6	6
(Ukraine) M Kostyuk (Romania) E-G Ruse	6	6
(Hungary) P Udvardy (Brazil) L Pigossi	3	4
(Ukraine) D Snigur (Belgium) H Vandewinkel	1	3
8	(Belgium) E Mertens; D Shnaider	6	6

Second round
4	(Chinese Taipei) S-w Hsieh (Latvia) J Ostapenko	6	7^{7}
PR	(Czech Republic) M Bouzková (Spain) S Sorribes Tormo	1	6^{4}
(Argentina) N Fossa Huergo (Germany) T Korpatsch	0	7^{7}	4
14	(Chinese Taipei) H-c Chan (Australia) M Joint	6	6^{3}	6
10	(Australia) E Perez (Netherlands) D Schuurs	6	6^{3}	6
E Pridankina (China) Q Tang	2	7^{7}	3
(Ukraine) M Kostyuk (Romania) E-G Ruse
8	(Belgium) E Mertens; D Shnaider	w/o

Third round
4	(Chinese Taipei) S-w Hsieh (Latvia) J Ostapenko	6	6
14	(Chinese Taipei) H-c Chan (Australia) M Joint	4	4
10	(Australia) E Perez (Netherlands) D Schuurs	5	3
8	(Belgium) E Mertens; D Shnaider	7	6

Quarterfinals
4	(Chinese Taipei) S-w Hsieh (Latvia) J Ostapenko	5	3
8	(Belgium) E Mertens; D Shnaider	7	6

=== Bottom half ===
==== Section 3 ====
First round
5	(China) H Guo (France) K Mladenovic	7^{7}	4	4
(Poland) M Chwalińska (Poland) M Linette	6^{5}	6	6
A Korneeva (Czech Republic) D Vidmanova	5	4
(Hungary) A Bondár (Ukraine) A Kalinina	7	6
(Canada) L Fernandez (Indonesia) J Tjen	6	6
(Netherlands) I Haverlag (Slovenia) N Radišić	1	1
(United States) A Li (Denmark) C Tauson	2	2
9	(New Zealand) E Routliffe (Indonesia) A Sutjiadi	6	6
15	(Norway) U Eikeri (United States) Q Gleason	6	3	5
(Japan) M Uchijima (China) Xin Wang	3	6	7
WC	(United States) A Krueger (United States) R Montgomery	7	6
(Czech Republic) L Nosková (Slovakia) R Šramková	5	4
(Germany) T Maria (Turkey) Z Sönmez	6	7^{7}
E Alexandrova (Australia) T Gibson	3	6^{4}
PR	(Chile) A Guarachi (Egypt) M Sherif	5	6^{7}
3	(Kazakhstan) A Danilina (Serbia) A Krunić	7	7^{9}

Second round
(Poland) M Chwalińska (Poland) M Linette	6	3	3
(Hungary) A Bondár (Ukraine) A Kalinina	3	6	6
(Canada) L Fernandez (Indonesia) J Tjen	4	4
9	(New Zealand) E Routliffe (Indonesia) A Sutjiadi	6	6
(Japan) M Uchijima (China) Xin Wang	2	6	1
WC	(United States) A Krueger (United States) R Montgomery	6	4	6
(Germany) T Maria (Turkey) Z Sönmez	1	6
3	(Kazakhstan) A Danilina (Serbia) A Krunić	6	5^{r}

Third round
(Hungary) A Bondár (Ukraine) A Kalinina	2	6	2
9	(New Zealand) E Routliffe (Indonesia) A Sutjiadi	6	4	6
WC	(United States) A Krueger (United States) R Montgomery	6	6
(Germany) T Maria (Turkey) Z Sönmez	3	2

Quarterfinals
9	(New Zealand) E Routliffe (Indonesia) A Sutjiadi	6^{5}	3
WC	(United States) A Krueger (United States) R Montgomery	7^{7}	6

==== Section 4 ====
First round
7	(China) X Jiang (China) S Zhang	6	6
(United States) S Kenin (Austria) A Potapova	1	3
(Australia) D Kasatkina (Ukraine) Y Starodubtseva	4	4
(Hong Kong) E Chong (China) Z Yang	6	6
(Czech Republic) N Bartůňková (Colombia) C Osorio	6	2	2
(Ukraine) L Kichenok (Ukraine) N Kichenok	4	6	6
(Japan) M Kato (Chinese Taipei) F-h Wu	3	6	6
12	(Slovakia) T Mihalíková (United Kingdom) O Nicholls	6	3	3
16	(United States) A Muhammad (Hungary) F Stollár	6	2	6
(United States) A Parks; I Shymanovich	4	6	3
WC	(United States) B Payne (United States) S Shumate	3	0
(Japan) E Hozumi (Slovenia) A Klepač	6	6
(Italy) S Errani (Austria) L Tagger	7	7^{7}
WC	(United States) A Penickova (United States) K Penickova	5	6^{3}
(Czech Republic) A Dețiuc; I Khromacheva	1	3
2	(Canada) G Dabrowski (Brazil) L Stefani	6	6

Second round
7	(China) X Jiang (China) S Zhang	7^{8}	6
(Hong Kong) E Chong (China) Z Yang	6^{6}	1
(Ukraine) L Kichenok (Ukraine) N Kichenok	2	6	2
(Japan) M Kato (Chinese Taipei) F-h Wu	6	4	6
16	(United States) A Muhammad (Hungary) F Stollár	4	4
(Japan) E Hozumi (Slovenia) A Klepač	6	6
(Italy) S Errani (Austria) L Tagger	2	5
2	(Canada) G Dabrowski (Brazil) L Stefani	6	7

Third round
7	(China) X Jiang (China) S Zhang	6	7^{8}
(Japan) M Kato (Chinese Taipei) F-h Wu	4	6^{6}
(Japan) E Hozumi (Slovenia) A Klepač	0	3
2	(Canada) G Dabrowski (Brazil) L Stefani	6	6

Quarterfinals
7	(China) X Jiang (China) S Zhang	3	4
2	(Canada) G Dabrowski (Brazil) L Stefani	6	6

== Seeded teams ==
The following are the seeded teams. Seedings are based on WTA rankings as of August 31, 2026.

Country	Player	Country	Player	Rank	Seed
CZE	Kateřina Siniaková	USA	Taylor Townsend	3	1
CAN	Gabriela Dabrowski	BRA	Luisa Stefani	7	2
KAZ	Anna Danilina	SRB	Aleksandra Krunić	11	3
TPE	Hsieh Su-wei	LAT	Jeļena Ostapenko	25	4
CHN	Guo Hanyu	FRA	Kristina Mladenovic	26	5
ESP	Cristina Bucșa	USA	Nicole Melichar-Martinez	30	6
CHN	Jiang Xinyu	CHN	Zhang Shuai	39	7
BEL	Elise Mertens		Diana Shnaider	39	8
NZL	Erin Routliffe	INA	Aldila Sutjiadi	42	9
AUS	Ellen Perez	NED	Demi Schuurs	44	10
JPN	Shuko Aoyama	TPE	Liang En-shuo	46	11
SVK	Tereza Mihalíková	GBR	Olivia Nicholls	52	12
AUS	Storm Hunter	USA	Desirae Krawczyk	57	13
TPE	Chan Hao-ching	AUS	Maya Joint	78	14
NOR	Ulrikke Eikeri	USA	Quinn Gleason	79	15
USA	Asia Muhammad	HUN	Fanny Stollár	81	16

== Other entry information ==
=== Wildcards ===
- (United States) DJ Bennett / (United States) Ava Esposito
- (United States) Reese Brantmeier / (United States) Savannah Broadus
- (United States) Ashlyn Krueger / (United States) Robin Montgomery
- (United States) Claire Liu / (United States) Julieta Pareja
- (United States) Bella Payne / (United States) Sara Shumate
- (United States) Annika Penickova / (United States) Kristina Penickova
- (United States) Serena Williams / (United States) Venus Williams

=== Protected ranking ===
- (Czech Republic) Marie Bouzková / (Spain) Sara Sorribes Tormo
- (Chile) Alexa Guarachi / (Egypt) Mayar Sherif
- (Croatia) Darija Jurak Schreiber / (Croatia) Antonia Ružić

=== Alternates ===
- (Japan) Ena Shibahara / (Thailand) Lanlana Tararudee

=== Withdrawals ===
- (Italy) Elisabetta Cocciaretto / (Kazakhstan) Yulia Putintseva → replaced by (Japan) Ena Shibahara / (Thailand) Lanlana Tararudee
