= 2026 Cary Tennis Classic – Men's singles =

Men's singles
- 2026 Cary Tennis Classic

Final
- Champion: (United States) Braden Shick
- Runner-up: (France) Timo Legout
- Score: 4–6, 7–5, 6–3

Events
Singles	men	women
Doubles	men	women
- Cary Tennis Classic

Rei Sakamoto was the defending champion but lost in the second round to Timo Legout.

Braden Shick won the title after defeating Legout 4–6, 7–5, 6–3 in the final.

== Seeds ==
1. (Japan) Rei Sakamoto (second round)
2. (Canada) Liam Draxl (first round)
3. (Estonia) Daniil Glinka (second round)
4. (Australia) Bernard Tomic (withdrew)
5. (United States) Michael Mmoh (second round, retired)
6. (Argentina) Juan Pablo Ficovich (first round)
7. (United Kingdom) Liam Broady (second round)
8. (Japan) Rio Noguchi (first round)

== Draw ==
Key

- Q = Qualifier
- WC = Wild card
- LL = Lucky loser
- Alt = Alternate
- ITF = ITF entry
- PR = Protected ranking
- SR = Special ranking
- SE = Special exempt
- JE = Junior exempt
- JR = Junior Accelerator Programme entrant
- CO = College Accelerator Programme entrant
- NG = Next Gen Accelerator Program entrant
- w/o = Walkover
- r = Retired
- d = Defaulted

=== Finals ===
Semifinals
CO	(France) Timo Legout	7	7
Q	(Australia) Edward Winter	5	5
(Japan) Yosuke Watanuki
(United States) Braden Shick	w/o

Final
CO	(France) Timo Legout	6	5	3
(United States) Braden Shick	4	7	6

=== Top half ===
First round
1	(Japan) R Sakamoto	6	6^{3}	6
WC	(France) Jules Leroux	3	7^{7}	2
CO	(France) T Legout	6	6
(Jamaica) B Bicknell	3	2
PR	(Australia) B Ellis	7	6^{4}	7
(Australia) P Sekulic	5	7^{7}	5
Q	(United States) O Baris	6	5	6
6	(Argentina) JP Ficovich	4	7	4
3	(Estonia) D Glinka	7^{7}	2	7^{7}
PR	(United States) A Mayo	6^{1}	6	6^{5}
Q	(Australia) E Winter	3
Q	(United States) A Fenty	0^{r}
(United Kingdom) G Hussey	1	2
WC	(United States) William Manning	6	6
Q	(Japan) Y Shimizu	6^{3}	6^{5}
5	(United States) M Mmoh	7^{7}	7^{7}

Second round
1	(Japan) R Sakamoto	4	3
CO	(France) T Legout	6	6
PR	(Australia) B Ellis	1	4
Q	(United States) O Baris	6	6
3	(Estonia) D Glinka	7^{8}	4	4
Q	(Australia) E Winter	6^{6}	6	6
WC	(United States) W Manning	7^{9}	3	3
5	(United States) M Mmoh	6^{7}	6	3^{r}

Quarterfinals
CO	(France) T Legout	6	6
Q	(United States) O Baris	4	1
Q	(Australia) E Winter	6	6
WC	(United States) W Manning	3	4

Semifinals
CO	(France) T Legout	7	7
Q	(Australia) E Winter	5	5

=== Bottom half ===
First round
7	(United Kingdom) L Broady	6	6
Alt	(Japan) H Matsuoka	1	2
NG	(United States) J Kennedy	6	6
(Japan) K Uchida	4	4
(Japan) Y Watanuki	3	6	6
(United States) Andre Ilagan	6	0	3
(Chinese Taipei) T-l Wu	6^{8}	6	7^{7}
LL	(Canada) J Boulais	7^{10}	4	6^{3}
8	(Japan) R Noguchi	1	3
(Spain) Àlex Martínez	6	6
WC	(United States) JJ Wolf	7	6^{5}	3
Q	(Japan) J Friend	5	7^{7}	6
(China) F Sun	1	2
(United States) B Shick	6	6
Q	(India) D Suresh	7^{7}	6
2	(Canada) L Draxl	6^{5}	4

Second round
7	(United Kingdom) L Broady	6	5	6^{5}
NG	(United States) J Kennedy	2	7	7^{7}
(Japan) Y Watanuki	6	6^{1}	6
(Chinese Taipei) T-l Wu	3	7^{7}	1
(Spain) À Martínez	1	2
Q	(Japan) J Friend	6	6
(United States) B Shick	6	4
Q	(India) D Suresh	4	1^{r}

Quarterfinals
NG	(United States) J Kennedy	1	4
(Japan) Y Watanuki	6	6
Q	(Japan) J Friend	6^{6}	4
(United States) B Shick	7^{8}	6

Semifinals
(Japan) Y Watanuki
(United States) B Shick	w/o
