= Savannah Broadus =

American tennis player (born 2002)

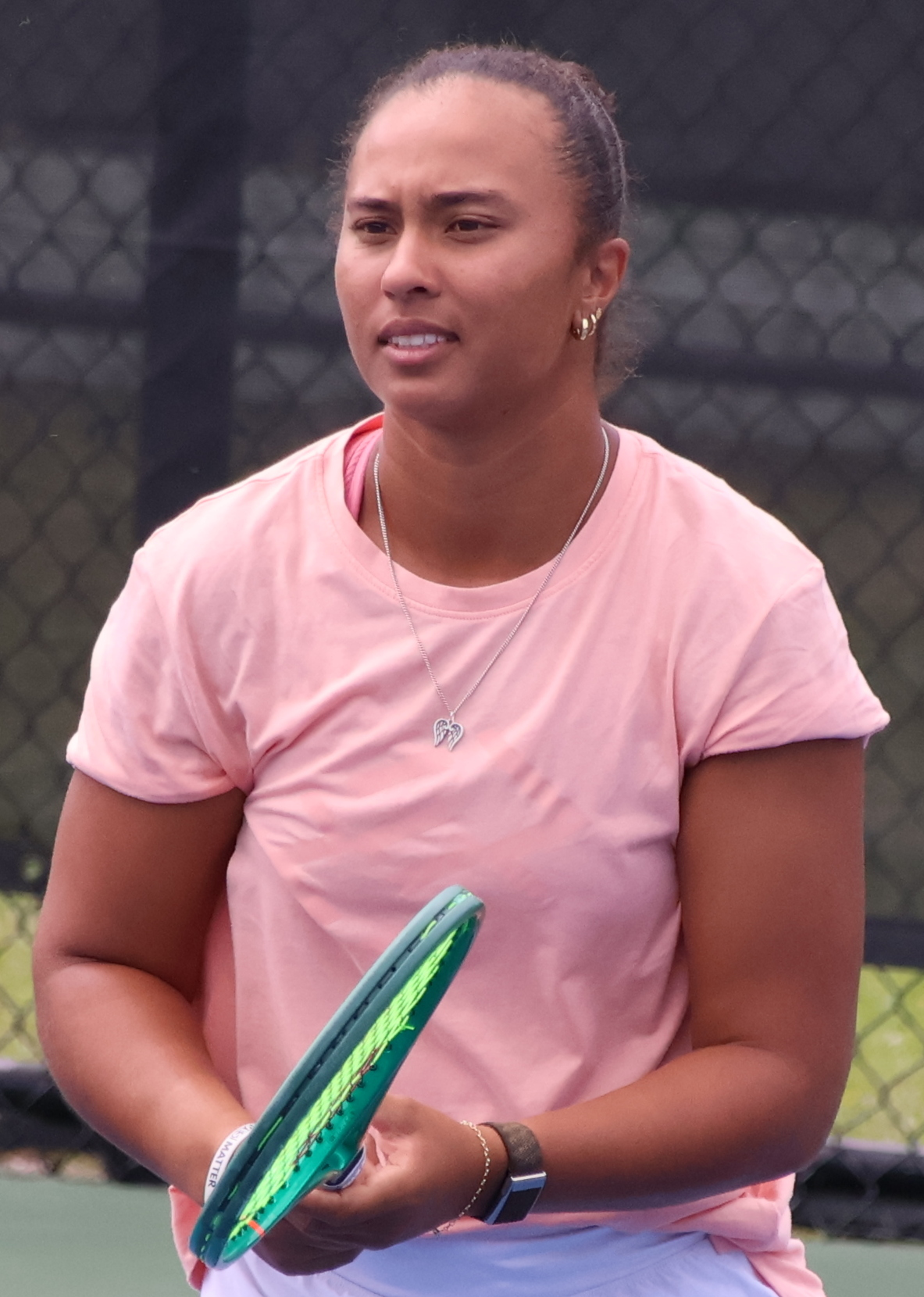
- Broadus in 2026
- Country (sports): United States
- Born: September 18, 2002 (age 24)
- Prize money: $53,291

Singles
- Career record: 81–42
- Career titles: 2 ITF
- Highest ranking: No. 307 (August 10, 2026)
- Current ranking: No. 307 (August 10, 2026)

Grand Slam singles results
- US Open: Q1 (2026)

Doubles
- Career record: 77–24
- Career titles: 12 ITF
- Highest ranking: No. 160 (August 10, 2026)
- Current ranking: No. 160 (August 10, 2026)

Grand Slam doubles results
- US Open: 1R (2026)
- Last updated on: 21 August 2026.

Savannah Broadus (born September 18, 2002) is an American tennis player. She has a career-high singles ranking by the WTA of No. 456 and a best doubles ranking of No. 241, both achieved on 15 June 2026. Broadus has won two singles titles and ten doubles titles on the ITF World Tennis Tour.

== Career ==
Broadus has a career-high ITF junior combined ranking of 26, achieved on 9 September 2019. Broadus won the 2019 Wimbledon Championships – Girls' doubles title with Abigail Forbes.

Broadus won her first tournament on the ITF Women's Circuit in May 2019 in Williamsburg, partnering with fellow American Vanessa Ong.

Broadus played college tennis at Pepperdine University.

== Personal life ==
Broadus is African American.

== WTA 125 finals ==
=== Doubles: 1 (runner-up) ===
Result	W–L	Date	Tournament	Surface	Partner	Opponents	Score
Loss	0–1	Jul 2026	Hall of Fame Open, United States	Grass	(United States) Kylie Collins	Iryna Shymanovich (United States) Katie Volynets	2–6, 6–7^{(6)}

== ITF Circuit finals ==
=== Singles: 3 (2 titles, 1 runner-up) ===
Legend W100 tournaments (0–1) W50 tournaments (1–0) W15 tournaments (1–0)	Finals by surface Hard (2–1)

Result	W–L	Date	Tournament	Tier	Surface	Opponent	Score
Win	1–0	Nov 2024	ITF Lincoln, United States	W15	Hard (i)	(United States) Rachel Gailis	6–3, 4–6, 7–5
Win	2–0	Jun 2026	Guimarães Ladies Open, Portugal	W50	Hard	Aliona Falei	1–6, 6–3, 6–4
Loss	2–1	Jun 2026	Cary Tennis Classic, United States	W100	Hard	(Italy) Lucrezia Stefanini	3–6, 2–6

=== Doubles: 18 (14 titles, 4 runner-ups) ===
Legend W100 tournaments W75 tournaments W50 tournaments W25/35 tournaments W15 tournaments	Finals by surface Hard (10–4) Clay (4–0)

Result	W–L	Date	Tournament	Tier	Surface	Partner	Opponent	Score
Win	1–0	May 2019	ITF Williamsburg, United States	W15	Clay	(United States) Vanessa Ong	(United States) Elaine Chervinsky (United States) Kylie Collins	6–3, 6–1
Loss	1–1	Oct 2019	Waco Showdown, United States	W25	Hard	(United States) Vanessa Ong	(Kazakhstan) Anna Danilina (Montenegro) Vladica Babić	3–6, 2–6
Win	2–1	Jul 2023	ITF Lakewood, United States	W15	Hard	(Ukraine) Anita Sahdiieva	(United States) Reese Brantmeier (United States) Fiona Crawley	6–3, 6–3
Win	3–1	Nov 2024	ITF Lincoln, United States	W15	Hard (i)	(United States) Carolyn Campana	(Kenya) Angella Okutoyi (Egypt) Merna Refaat	4–6, 6–3, [10–2]
Win	4–1	Sep 2025	ITF Kayseri, Turkiye	W15	Hard	(India) Madhurima Sawant	(Turkey) Selina Atay (Ukraine) Mariia Bergen	7–6^{(2)}, 6–3
Win	5–1	Sep 2025	ITF Kayseri, Turkiye	W15	Hard	(Belgium) Kaat Coppez	(United Kingdom) Esther Adeshina (Australia) Tenika McGiffin	6–4, 4–6, [12–10]
Win	6–1	Oct 2025	ITF Norman, United States	W35	Hard	(Netherlands) Rose Marie Nijkamp	(Spain) Maria Berlanga Bandera (Mexico) Julia García Ruiz	6–2, 6–3
Win	7–1	Nov 2025	ITF Austin, United States	W50	Hard	(Kazakhstan) Sonja Zhiyenbayeva	(United States) Victoria Osuigwe (United States) Alana Smith	6–3, 6–3
Win	8–1	Dec 2025	ITF Sharm El Sheikh, Egypt	W35	Hard	(United States) Hibah Shaikh	(France) Yara Bartashevich (Latvia) Kamilla Bartone	6–4, 6–4
Win	9–1	Apr 2026	ITF Boca Raton, United States	W35	Clay	(United States) Abigail Rencheli	(Venezuela) Sofía Cabezas Domínguez (United States) Anna Rogers	6–4, 3–6, [10–3]
Win	10–1	Apr 2026	Florida's Sports Coast Open, United States	W35	Clay	(United States) Hibah Shaikh	Daria Egorova; Anastasia Tikhonova	6–3, 5–7, [10–5]
Win	11–1	May 2026	ITF Bethany Beach, United States	W35	Clay	(United States) Kylie Collins	(United States) Eryn Cayetano (United States) Haley Giavara	6–0, 7–5
Win	12–1	Jun 2026	Guimarães Ladies Open, Portugal	W50	Hard	(United States) Abigail Rencheli	(Slovakia) Viktória Hrunčáková (Slovakia) Katarína Kužmová	6–3, 6–4
Loss	12–2	Jun 2026	Georgia's Rome Open, United States	W35	Hard	(United States) Kylie Collins	(United States) Jaeda Daniel (Australia) Lily Fairclough	5–7, 4–6
Loss	12–3	Jul 2026	Lexington Open, United States	W75	Hard	(United States) Kylie Collins	(United States) Ayana Akli (United States) Fiona Crawley	6–2, 6–7^{(3)}, [10–12]
Loss	12–4	Aug 2026	Landisville Tennis Challenge, United States	W100	Hard	(United States) Kylie Collins	(Chinese Taipei) Cho I-hsuan (Chinese Taipei) Cho Yi-tsen	2–6, 4–6
Win	13–4	Sep 2026	Central Coast Pro Tennis Open, United States	W100	Hard	(United States) Allura Zamarripa	(United States) Whitney Osuigwe (United States) Akasha Urhobo	7–5, 6–2
Win	14–4	Oct 2026	Tyler Pro Challenge, United States	W100	Hard	(United States) Allura Zamarripa	(United States) Kylie Collins (United States) Kristina Penickova	7–6^{(5)}, 6–0

== Junior Grand Slam tournament finals ==
=== Doubles: 1 (title) ===
Result	Year	Tournament	Surface	Partner	Opponents	Score
Win	2019	Wimbledon	Grass	(United States) Abigail Forbes	(Latvia) Kamilla Bartone (Russia) Oksana Selekhmeteva	7–5, 5–7, 6–2
