= Sara Shumate =

American tennis player (born 2007)

- Country (sports): United States
- Born: October 29, 2007 (age 18)

Grand Slam doubles results
- US Open: 1R (2026)

Sara Shumate (born 29 October 2007) is an American tennis player.

== Career ==
From Charlotte, North Carolina, she signed with the University of Oklahoma in 2025.

She received a wildcard into the 2026 US Open doubles, partnering with Bella Payne, after they won the USTA Billie Jean King Girls' 18s National Championships without dropping a set, defeating Welles Newman and Jordyn Hazelitt in the final. The pair had previously won the U14 USTA National Doubles Championships together in 2022.
