= Bella Payne =

American tennis player (born 2007)

- Country (sports): United States
- Born: September 15, 2007 (age 19)

Singles
- Career titles: 0

Grand Slam doubles results
- US Open: 1R (2026)

Bella Payne (born 15 September 2007) is an American tennis player.

== Career ==
From Hilton Head Island, South Carolina, she was later based in Bradenton, Florida. She won the USTA Girls' 14 National Championship singles title in 2022. Having trained at the Van Der Meer Tennis Academy, she signed with the University of Georgia in 2025, having won the U18 Easter Bowl that year, the year after winning both singles and doubles titles at the U16 Easter Bowl in 2024.

She received a wildcard into the 2026 US Open doubles, partnering with Sara Shumate, after they won the USTA Billie Jean King Girls' 18s National Championships, defeating Welles Newman and Jordyn Hazelitt in the final.

Competing for the University of Georgia, she and partner Patricija Paukštytė reached the semi-finals at the 2026 NCAA Tennis Championship.
