= 2026 ITF Women's World Tennis Tour (April–June) =

The 2026 ITF Women's World Tennis Tour (1 April–24 June 2026), or the 2026 Women's World Tennis Tour (25–30 June 2026 and beyond), is the 2026 edition of the second-tier tour for women's professional tennis. It is organised by the International Tennis Federation and is a tier below the WTA Tour. The ITF Women's World Tennis Tour includes tournaments in five categories with prize money ranging from $15,000 up to $100,000.

== Key ==
Category
W100 tournaments ($100,000)
W75 tournaments ($60,000)
W50 tournaments ($40,000)
W35 tournaments ($30,000)
W15 tournaments ($15,000)

=== April ===
Week of	Tournament	Winner	Runners-up	Semifinalists	Quarterfinalists
April 6	Calvi, France; Hard; W75; Singles and doubles draws	(Belgium) Jeline Vandromme; 6–0, 6–0	(Canada) Katherine Sebov	(United Kingdom) Alicia Dudeney (Switzerland) Susan Bandecchi	(Switzerland) Valentina Ryser (Spain) Eva Guerrero Álvarez; Erika Andreeva (China) Gao Xinyu
April 6	Calvi, France; Hard; W75; Singles and doubles draws	(Czech Republic) Aneta Kučmová (Czech Republic) Aneta Laboutková; 6–4, 3–6, [10–3]	(Czech Republic) Michaela Bayerlová (Australia) Tenika McGiffin	(United Kingdom) Alicia Dudeney (Switzerland) Susan Bandecchi	(Switzerland) Valentina Ryser (Spain) Eva Guerrero Álvarez; Erika Andreeva (China) Gao Xinyu
April 6	Bujumbura, Burundi; Clay; W50; Singles and doubles draws	Darya Astakhova; 6–4, 6–4	(France) Margaux Rouvroy	(France) Alice Tubello (Switzerland) Alina Granwehr	(Brazil) Laura Pigossi (France) Lucie Nguyen Tan (Italy) Arianna Zucchini (Mexico) Ana Sofía Sánchez
April 6	Bujumbura, Burundi; Clay; W50; Singles and doubles draws	(United States) Julia Adams (Netherlands) Merel Hoedt; 6–4, 7–5	(France) Nahia Berecoechea (United Kingdom) Ranah Stoiber	(France) Alice Tubello (Switzerland) Alina Granwehr	(Brazil) Laura Pigossi (France) Lucie Nguyen Tan (Italy) Arianna Zucchini (Mexico) Ana Sofía Sánchez
April 6	Osaka, Japan; Hard; W35; Singles and doubles draws	(Japan) Kyōka Okamura; 6–4, 6–4	(United States) Hina Inoue	(Japan) Aoi Ito (Japan) Haruka Kaji	(Australia) Elena Micic (Japan) Ena Koike (Japan) Natsumi Kawaguchi (Japan) Misaki Matsuda
April 6	Osaka, Japan; Hard; W35; Singles and doubles draws	(Japan) Misaki Matsuda (Japan) Ikumi Yamazaki; 7–5, 6–2	(Japan) Ayumi Miyamoto (Japan) Himari Satō	(Japan) Aoi Ito (Japan) Haruka Kaji	(Australia) Elena Micic (Japan) Ena Koike (Japan) Natsumi Kawaguchi (Japan) Misaki Matsuda
April 6	Kunming Open; Anning, China; Clay; W35; Singles and doubles draws	Anastasia Zolotareva; 2–6, 6–2, 7–6^{(7–5)}	Alexandra Shubladze	Sofya Lansere (China) Zheng Wushuang	Varvara Panshina (Chinese Taipei) Yang Ya-yi (China) Yang Yidi; Elina Nepliy
April 6	Kunming Open; Anning, China; Clay; W35; Singles and doubles draws	Sofya Lansere; Alexandra Shubladze; 7–6^{(7–4)}, 6–1	(South Korea) Shin Ji-ho (Uzbekistan) Sevil Yuldasheva	Sofya Lansere (China) Zheng Wushuang	Varvara Panshina (Chinese Taipei) Yang Ya-yi (China) Yang Yidi; Elina Nepliy
April 6	Santa Margherita di Pula, Italy; Clay; W35; Singles and doubles draws	(Italy) Tyra Caterina Grant; 6–4, 6–2	(Czech Republic) Alena Kovačková	(Italy) Martina Trevisan (Italy) Beatrice Ricci	(Italy) Deborah Chiesa (Italy) Noemi Basiletti (Italy) Dalila Spiteri (Czech Republic) Julie Paštiková
April 6	Santa Margherita di Pula, Italy; Clay; W35; Singles and doubles draws	(Czech Republic) Alena Kovačková (Czech Republic) Jana Kovačková; 6–1, 6–3	(Italy) Deborah Chiesa (Malta) Francesca Curmi	(Italy) Martina Trevisan (Italy) Beatrice Ricci	(Italy) Deborah Chiesa (Italy) Noemi Basiletti (Italy) Dalila Spiteri (Czech Republic) Julie Paštiková
April 6	Boca Raton, United States; Clay; W35; Singles and doubles draws	(United States) Kayla Day; 6–3, 6–1	(United States) Mary Stoiana	(United States) Claire Liu (United States) Madison Sieg	(Serbia) Katarina Jokić (Italy) Tatiana Pieri (United States) Akasha Urhobo (Spain) Ángela Fita Boluda
April 6	Boca Raton, United States; Clay; W35; Singles and doubles draws	(United States) Savannah Broadus (United States) Abigail Rencheli; 6–4, 3–6, [10–3]	(Venezuela) Sofía Cabezas Domínguez (United States) Anna Rogers	(United States) Claire Liu (United States) Madison Sieg	(Serbia) Katarina Jokić (Italy) Tatiana Pieri (United States) Akasha Urhobo (Spain) Ángela Fita Boluda
April 6	Sharm El Sheikh, Egypt; Hard; W15; Singles and doubles draws	(Slovakia) Katarína Kužmová; 6–1, 3–6, 7–5	(Bulgaria) Isabella Shinikova	Daria Zelinskaya (Croatia) Karla Popović	Victoria Milovanova (Italy) Federica Sacco; Kristina Kroitor (Ukraine) Kateryna Diatlova
April 6	Sharm El Sheikh, Egypt; Hard; W15; Singles and doubles draws	Valeriia Artemeva; Darya Kharlanova; 6–3, 6–1	(Slovakia) Katarína Kužmová (Uzbekistan) Laima Vladson	Daria Zelinskaya (Croatia) Karla Popović	Victoria Milovanova (Italy) Federica Sacco; Kristina Kroitor (Ukraine) Kateryna Diatlova
April 6	Monastir, Tunisia; Hard; W15; Singles and doubles draws	(Ukraine) Daria Yesypchuk; 2–6, 7–6^{(7–3)}, 6–3	(Germany) Eva Marie Voracek	(United States) Malaika Rapolu (Italy) Angelica Raggi	(Poland) Anna Kmiecik (United States) Sara Daavettila (United Kingdom) Esther Adeshina (United Kingdom) Eliz Maloney
April 6	Monastir, Tunisia; Hard; W15; Singles and doubles draws	(Belgium) Kaat Coppez (Netherlands) Sarah van Emst; 6–2, 6–2	(United Kingdom) Esther Adeshina (Switzerland) Chelsea Fontenel	(United States) Malaika Rapolu (Italy) Angelica Raggi	(Poland) Anna Kmiecik (United States) Sara Daavettila (United Kingdom) Esther Adeshina (United Kingdom) Eliz Maloney
April 6	Bonita Springs, United States; Clay; W15; Singles and doubles draws	(United States) Carson Tanguilig; 7–5, 6–4	(United States) Ellie Schoppe	(Bulgaria) Gergana Topalova (Belgium) Margaux Maquet	Daria Egorova (United States) Kylie Collins (United States) Bella Payne (United States) Carlota Moreno
April 6	Bonita Springs, United States; Clay; W15; Singles and doubles draws	(United States) Kylie Collins (United States) Carson Tanguilig; 6–2, 6–3	(United States) Carlota Moreno (United States) Nadia Elle Valdez	(Bulgaria) Gergana Topalova (Belgium) Margaux Maquet	Daria Egorova (United States) Kylie Collins (United States) Bella Payne (United States) Carlota Moreno
April 13	Portorož, Slovenia; Clay; W75; Singles and doubles draws	(Spain) Sara Sorribes Tormo; 6–4, 6–1	(Spain) Leyre Romero Gormaz	(Sweden) Lisa Zaar (Spain) Marina Bassols Ribera	(United States) Claire Liu (Ukraine) Katarina Zavatska (Czech Republic) Tereza Martincová (Slovenia) Polona Hercog
April 13	Portorož, Slovenia; Clay; W75; Singles and doubles draws	(Slovakia) Viktória Hrunčáková (Czech Republic) Anna Sisková; 6–2, 6–4	(United States) Rasheeda McAdoo (Sweden) Lisa Zaar	(Sweden) Lisa Zaar (Spain) Marina Bassols Ribera	(United States) Claire Liu (Ukraine) Katarina Zavatska (Czech Republic) Tereza Martincová (Slovenia) Polona Hercog
April 13	Bujumbura, Burundi; Clay; W50; Singles and doubles draws	(France) Alice Tubello; 6–1, 6–3	(Burundi) Sada Nahimana	(Mexico) Ana Sofía Sánchez (Brazil) Laura Pigossi	(France) Margaux Rouvroy (Switzerland) Alina Granwehr (Netherlands) Merel Hoedt (France) Lucie Nguyen Tan
April 13	Bujumbura, Burundi; Clay; W50; Singles and doubles draws	(United States) Julia Adams (Netherlands) Merel Hoedt; 4–6, 7–5, [10–5]	(India) Vaidehi Chaudhari (Netherlands) Jasmijn Gimbrère	(Mexico) Ana Sofía Sánchez (Brazil) Laura Pigossi	(France) Margaux Rouvroy (Switzerland) Alina Granwehr (Netherlands) Merel Hoedt (France) Lucie Nguyen Tan
April 13	Miyazaki, Japan; Hard; W35; Singles and doubles draws	(Japan) Hayu Kinoshita; 6–4, 7–6^{(13–11)}	(United States) Hanna Chang	(Japan) Sakura Hosogi (Japan) Kanon Sawashiro	(South Korea) Ku Yeon-woo (Japan) Misaki Matsuda (Japan) Ena Koike (Japan) Sae Noguchi
April 13	Miyazaki, Japan; Hard; W35; Singles and doubles draws	(Japan) Anri Nagata (Japan) Naho Sato; 6–4, 7–6^{(7–2)}	(Japan) Misaki Matsuda (Japan) Eri Shimizu	(Japan) Sakura Hosogi (Japan) Kanon Sawashiro	(South Korea) Ku Yeon-woo (Japan) Misaki Matsuda (Japan) Ena Koike (Japan) Sae Noguchi
April 13	Luzhou, China; Hard; W35; Singles and doubles draws	(China) Bai Zhuoxuan; 6–4, 0–6, 6–1	(China) Shi Han	(China) Yao Xinxin; Alexandra Shubladze	(China) You Xiaodi (China) Ye Shiyu (China) Yuan Chengyiyi (China) Huang Yujia
April 13	Luzhou, China; Hard; W35; Singles and doubles draws	(China) Zhang Ying (China) Zheng Wushuang; 2–6, 6–4, [12–10]	(Chinese Taipei) Lee Ya-hsin (China) Li Zongyu	(China) Yao Xinxin; Alexandra Shubladze	(China) You Xiaodi (China) Ye Shiyu (China) Yuan Chengyiyi (China) Huang Yujia
April 13	Santa Margherita di Pula, Italy; Clay; W35; Singles and doubles draws	(Italy) Samira De Stefano; 6–0, 6–2	(Germany) Joëlle Steur	(Italy) Giorgia Pedone (Latvia) Beatrise Zeltiņa	(Croatia) Tara Würth (Germany) Ida Wobker (Italy) Alessandra Mazzola (Italy) Enola Chiesa
April 13	Santa Margherita di Pula, Italy; Clay; W35; Singles and doubles draws	(Greece) Sapfo Sakellaridi (Romania) Briana Szabó; 6–7^{(4–7)}, 7–6^{(8–6)}, [10–6]	(Greece) Marianne Argyrokastriti (Romania) Arina Vasilescu	(Italy) Giorgia Pedone (Latvia) Beatrise Zeltiņa	(Croatia) Tara Würth (Germany) Ida Wobker (Italy) Alessandra Mazzola (Italy) Enola Chiesa
April 13	Florida's Sports Coast Open; Zephyrhills, United States; Clay; W35; Singles and doubles draws	(United States) Akasha Urhobo; 7–5, 6–4	(Spain) Ángela Fita Boluda	(United States) Lea Ma (Spain) Alicia Herrero Liñana	(Poland) Gina Feistel (China) Xu Shilin (Netherlands) Eva Vedder; Daria Egorova
April 13	Florida's Sports Coast Open; Zephyrhills, United States; Clay; W35; Singles and doubles draws	(United States) Savannah Broadus (United States) Hibah Shaikh; 6–3, 5–7, [10–5]	Daria Egorova; Anastasia Tikhonova	(United States) Lea Ma (Spain) Alicia Herrero Liñana	(Poland) Gina Feistel (China) Xu Shilin (Netherlands) Eva Vedder; Daria Egorova
April 13	Singapore; Hard (i); W15; Singles and doubles draws	(New Zealand) Valentina Ivanov; 6–4, 6–2	(Hong Kong) Cody Wong	(Japan) Erika Sema (China) Zhang Junhan	(Luxembourg) Marie Weckerle (South Korea) Kim Yu-jin (New Zealand) Aishi Das (Japan) Rinko Matsuda
April 13	Singapore; Hard (i); W15; Singles and doubles draws	(Japan) Rinko Matsuda (Luxembourg) Marie Weckerle; 7–6^{(8–6)}, 6–2	(Japan) Erika Sema (Chinese Taipei) Tsao Chia-yi	(Japan) Erika Sema (China) Zhang Junhan	(Luxembourg) Marie Weckerle (South Korea) Kim Yu-jin (New Zealand) Aishi Das (Japan) Rinko Matsuda
April 13	Wiphold International; Pretoria, South Africa; Hard; W15; Singles and doubles draws	(China) Mi Lan; 6–0, 6–2	Ksenia Smirnova	(Turkey) İrem Kurt (United States) Victoria Mulville	(Germany) Franziska Sziedat (Turkey) Defne Çırpanlı (United States) Ava Hrastar (France) Astrid Cirotte
April 13	Wiphold International; Pretoria, South Africa; Hard; W15; Singles and doubles draws	(United States) Ava Hrastar (United States) Victoria Mulville; 6–1, 6–4	(Germany) Franziska Sziedat (Germany) Angelina Wirges	(Turkey) İrem Kurt (United States) Victoria Mulville	(Germany) Franziska Sziedat (Turkey) Defne Çırpanlı (United States) Ava Hrastar (France) Astrid Cirotte
April 13	Sharm El Sheikh, Egypt; Hard; W15; Singles and doubles draws	(Egypt) Lamis Alhussein Abdel Aziz; 6–7^{(3–7)}, 6–3, 6–1	(Netherlands) Stéphanie Visscher	Maria Golovina; Kristina Kroitor	(Egypt) Sandra Samir; Daria Zelinskaya (Slovakia) Radka Zelníčková (India) Sahaja Yamalapalli
April 13	Sharm El Sheikh, Egypt; Hard; W15; Singles and doubles draws	(Egypt) Yasmin Ezzat (Uzbekistan) Laima Vladson; 7–5, 3–6, [10–6]	Daria Zelinskaya (Slovakia) Radka Zelníčková	Maria Golovina; Kristina Kroitor	(Egypt) Sandra Samir; Daria Zelinskaya (Slovakia) Radka Zelníčková (India) Sahaja Yamalapalli
April 13	Monastir, Tunisia; Hard; W15; Singles and doubles draws	(Hong Kong) Adithya Karunaratne; 6–4, 6–1	(Bulgaria) Iva Ivanova	(Germany) Eva Marie Voracek (Italy) Verena Meliss	(United States) Carolyn Ansari (Switzerland) Chelsea Fontenel (Spain) Alba Rey García (Netherlands) Madelief Hageman
April 13	Monastir, Tunisia; Hard; W15; Singles and doubles draws	(Switzerland) Chelsea Fontenel (Poland) Amelia Paszun; 7–5, 4–6, [10–7]	(Italy) Lavinia Luciano (Italy) Matilde Mariani	(Germany) Eva Marie Voracek (Italy) Verena Meliss	(United States) Carolyn Ansari (Switzerland) Chelsea Fontenel (Spain) Alba Rey García (Netherlands) Madelief Hageman
April 13	Orlando, United States; Clay; W15; Singles and doubles draws	(Belgium) Margaux Maquet; 6–0, 6–3	(United States) Emery Combs	(Ukraine) Sofiia Bielinska (United States) Capucine Jauffret	(United States) Kailey Evans (United States) Ava Markham (United States) Sarah Ye (Spain) Didi Bredberg Canizares
April 13	Orlando, United States; Clay; W15; Singles and doubles draws	(United States) Elizabeth Coleman (United States) Kailey Evans; 6–3, 7–5	(Italy) Anastasia Bertacchi (Brazil) Carolina Bohrer Martins	(Ukraine) Sofiia Bielinska (United States) Capucine Jauffret	(United States) Kailey Evans (United States) Ava Markham (United States) Sarah Ye (Spain) Didi Bredberg Canizares
April 20	Ando Securities Open; Tokyo, Japan; Hard; W100; Singles – Doubles	(Australia) Taylah Preston; 6–1, 4–6, 6–4	(Thailand) Lanlana Tararudee	Polina Iatcenko (Japan) Mai Hontama	(Thailand) Mananchaya Sawangkaew (Czech Republic) Gabriela Knutson (Japan) Hayu Kinoshita (United Kingdom) Harriet Dart
April 20	Ando Securities Open; Tokyo, Japan; Hard; W100; Singles – Doubles	(Australia) Alexandra Osborne (Hong Kong) Cody Wong; 3–6, 7–5, [10–7]	(Hong Kong) Eudice Chong (Chinese Taipei) Liang En-shuo	Polina Iatcenko (Japan) Mai Hontama	(Thailand) Mananchaya Sawangkaew (Czech Republic) Gabriela Knutson (Japan) Hayu Kinoshita (United Kingdom) Harriet Dart
April 20	Boar's Head Resort Women's Open; Charlottesville, United States; Clay; W100; Singles and doubles draws	(Mexico) Renata Zarazúa; 6–1, 1–6, 7–5	(Argentina) Martina Capurro Taborda	(United States) Elizabeth Mandlik (United States) Akasha Urhobo	(Poland) Gina Feistel (United States) Mary Stoiana (United States) Kayla Day (Canada) Kayla Cross
April 20	Boar's Head Resort Women's Open; Charlottesville, United States; Clay; W100; Singles and doubles draws	(Spain) Alicia Herrero Liñana (United States) Anna Rogers; 6–1, 6–3	(United States) Eryn Cayetano (United States) Allura Zamarripa	(United States) Elizabeth Mandlik (United States) Akasha Urhobo	(Poland) Gina Feistel (United States) Mary Stoiana (United States) Kayla Day (Canada) Kayla Cross
April 20	Chiasso Open; Chiasso, Switzerland; Clay; W75; Singles and doubles draws	(Uzbekistan) Maria Timofeeva; 6–2, 6–3	(Italy) Lisa Pigato	(France) Alice Ramé (Italy) Samira De Stefano	(Switzerland) Susan Bandecchi (Liechtenstein) Kathinka von Deichmann (Czech Republic) Tereza Martincová (Ukraine) Katarina Zavatska
April 20	Chiasso Open; Chiasso, Switzerland; Clay; W75; Singles and doubles draws	(United States) Rasheeda McAdoo (Greece) Sapfo Sakellaridi; 6–2, 3–6, [10–8]	(Czech Republic) Aneta Kučmová (Czech Republic) Aneta Laboutková	(France) Alice Ramé (Italy) Samira De Stefano	(Switzerland) Susan Bandecchi (Liechtenstein) Kathinka von Deichmann (Czech Republic) Tereza Martincová (Ukraine) Katarina Zavatska
April 20	ITF Women's Circuit – Baotou; Baotou, China; Clay (i); W50; Singles and doubles draws	(China) Wang Xiyu; 6–2, 6–3	Anastasia Zolotareva	(China) Ren Yufei; Varvara Panshina	(Italy) Diletta Cherubini (Lithuania) Justina Mikulskytė; Rada Zolotareva (China) Gao Xinyu
April 20	ITF Women's Circuit – Baotou; Baotou, China; Clay (i); W50; Singles and doubles draws	(Kazakhstan) Zhibek Kulambayeva; Ekaterina Reyngold; 6–1, 6–1	(Italy) Diletta Cherubini (China) Yuan Chengyiyi	(China) Ren Yufei; Varvara Panshina	(Italy) Diletta Cherubini (Lithuania) Justina Mikulskytė; Rada Zolotareva (China) Gao Xinyu
April 20	Roehampton, United Kingdom; Hard; W50; Singles and doubles draws	(Czech Republic) Vendula Valdmannová; 3–2 ret.	(Slovakia) Viktória Hrunčáková	(Israel) Lina Glushko (United States) Carolyn Ansari	(France) Amandine Monnot (Netherlands) Britt du Pree (Belgium) Jana Otzipka (United Kingdom) Alicia Dudeney
April 20	Roehampton, United Kingdom; Hard; W50; Singles and doubles draws	(United Kingdom) Freya Christie (United Kingdom) Eden Silva; 7–6^{(9–7)}, 3–6, [10–6]	(United Kingdom) Emily Appleton (Slovakia) Viktória Hrunčáková	(Israel) Lina Glushko (United States) Carolyn Ansari	(France) Amandine Monnot (Netherlands) Britt du Pree (Belgium) Jana Otzipka (United Kingdom) Alicia Dudeney
April 20	Miyazaki, Japan; Hard; W35; Singles and doubles draws	(United States) Hanna Chang; 6–3, 4–2 ret.	(South Korea) Jeong Bo-young	(Switzerland) Valentina Ryser (Japan) Natsuki Yoshimoto	(United Kingdom) Katie Swan (China) Lu Jiajing (Australia) Elena Micic (Japan) Hikaru Sato
April 20	Miyazaki, Japan; Hard; W35; Singles and doubles draws	(Japan) Anri Nagata (Japan) Naho Sato; 2–6, 6–3, [10–8]	(Japan) Ayumi Miyamoto (Japan) Kisa Yoshioka	(Switzerland) Valentina Ryser (Japan) Natsuki Yoshimoto	(United Kingdom) Katie Swan (China) Lu Jiajing (Australia) Elena Micic (Japan) Hikaru Sato
April 20	Santa Margherita di Pula, Italy; Clay; W35; Singles and doubles draws	(Croatia) Tara Würth; 6–3, 2–6, 6–2	(Germany) Joëlle Steur	(Serbia) Natalija Senić (Italy) Gaia Maduzzi	(Italy) Laura Mair (Serbia) Dunja Marić (Italy) Vittoria Paganetti (France) Emma Léné
April 20	Santa Margherita di Pula, Italy; Clay; W35; Singles and doubles draws	(Italy) Enola Chiesa (Germany) Joëlle Steur; 6–1, 6–3	(Finland) Laura Hietaranta (France) Tiphanie Lemaître	(Serbia) Natalija Senić (Italy) Gaia Maduzzi	(Italy) Laura Mair (Serbia) Dunja Marić (Italy) Vittoria Paganetti (France) Emma Léné
April 20	Sharm El Sheikh, Egypt; Hard; W35; Singles and doubles draws	(Netherlands) Stéphanie Visscher; 6–1, 6–4	(Poland) Weronika Ewald	(Slovakia) Radka Zelníčková (Egypt) Lamis Alhussein Abdel Aziz	(Poland) Martyna Kubka; Maria Golovina (Kazakhstan) Aruzhan Sagandykova; Daria Zelinskaya
April 20	Sharm El Sheikh, Egypt; Hard; W35; Singles and doubles draws	(Poland) Martyna Kubka (Slovakia) Katarína Kužmová; 6–4, 6–1	(Egypt) Sandra Samir (Slovakia) Radka Zelníčková	(Slovakia) Radka Zelníčková (Egypt) Lamis Alhussein Abdel Aziz	(Poland) Martyna Kubka; Maria Golovina (Kazakhstan) Aruzhan Sagandykova; Daria Zelinskaya
April 20	Charlotte, United States; Clay; W35; Singles and doubles draws	(United States) Amelia Honer; 3–6, 6–2, 6–3	(Netherlands) Eva Vedder	(China) Xu Shilin (United States) Emma Jackson	(Slovakia) Irina Balus (United States) Bella Payne (United States) Maya Iyengar (United States) Ava Markham
April 20	Charlotte, United States; Clay; W35; Singles and doubles draws	(Brazil) Luiza Fullana (Brazil) Thaísa Grana Pedretti; 6–4, 6–2	(Venezuela) Sofía Cabezas Domínguez (Netherlands) Eva Vedder	(China) Xu Shilin (United States) Emma Jackson	(Slovakia) Irina Balus (United States) Bella Payne (United States) Maya Iyengar (United States) Ava Markham
April 20	Singapore; Hard (i); W15; Singles and doubles draws	(Japan) Rinko Matsuda; 7–6^{(7–4)}, 6–2	(South Korea) Back Da-yeon	(China) Sun Yingqun (New Zealand) Valentina Ivanov	(South Korea) Kim Yu-jin (Japan) Erika Sema (South Korea) Choi Seo-yun (Chinese Taipei) Tsao Chia-yi
April 20	Singapore; Hard (i); W15; Singles and doubles draws	(Chinese Taipei) Lin Fang-an (South Korea) Shin Ji-ho; 7–6^{(7–1)}, 5–7, [10–5]	(Japan) Erika Sema (Chinese Taipei) Tsao Chia-yi	(China) Sun Yingqun (New Zealand) Valentina Ivanov	(South Korea) Kim Yu-jin (Japan) Erika Sema (South Korea) Choi Seo-yun (Chinese Taipei) Tsao Chia-yi
April 20	Panipat, India; Hard; W15; Singles and doubles draws	(Japan) Michika Ozeki; 7–5, 4–6, 6–3	Ekaterina Yashina	(India) Shruti Ahlawat (India) Akanksha Nitture	(India) Vaidehi Chaudhari; Ksenia Laskutova (India) Akansha Ghosh; Ksenia Krupenina
April 20	Panipat, India; Hard; W15; Singles and doubles draws	(India) Akanksha Nitture (Japan) Michika Ozeki; 0–6, 6–4, [10–5]	Ksenia Laskutova; Ekaterina Yashina	(India) Shruti Ahlawat (India) Akanksha Nitture	(India) Vaidehi Chaudhari; Ksenia Laskutova (India) Akansha Ghosh; Ksenia Krupenina
April 20	Wiphold International; Pretoria, South Africa; Hard; W15; Singles and doubles draws	Ksenia Smirnova; 6–3 ret.	(Germany) Franziska Sziedat	(China) Mi Lan (Germany) Ann Akasha Ceuca	(United States) Victoria Mulville (Netherlands) Coco Bosman (Israel) Maayan Laron (Germany) Angelina Wirges
April 20	Wiphold International; Pretoria, South Africa; Hard; W15; Singles and doubles draws	Doubles competition was cancelled due to ongoing poor weather		(China) Mi Lan (Germany) Ann Akasha Ceuca	(United States) Victoria Mulville (Netherlands) Coco Bosman (Israel) Maayan Laron (Germany) Angelina Wirges
April 20	Monastir, Tunisia; Hard; W15; Singles and doubles draws	(Serbia) Elena Milovanović; 4–6, 6–2, 7–6^{(7–3)}	(Bulgaria) Iva Ivanova	(Italy) Viola Turini (Italy) Francesca Gandolfi	(Germany) Fabienne Gettwart (Ukraine) Mariia Lazarenko (France) Marie Villet (Romania) Bianca Bărbulescu
April 20	Monastir, Tunisia; Hard; W15; Singles and doubles draws	(Bulgaria) Yoana Konstantinova (Turkey) Ada Kumru; 6–3, 6–2	(France) Marie Villet (Germany) Anja Wildgruber	(Italy) Viola Turini (Italy) Francesca Gandolfi	(Germany) Fabienne Gettwart (Ukraine) Mariia Lazarenko (France) Marie Villet (Romania) Bianca Bărbulescu
April 20	Orlando, United States; Clay; W15; Singles and doubles draws	(United States) Welles Newman; 3–6, 7–6^{(9–7)}, 6–0	(United States) Janae Preston	(Argentina) Justina María González Daniele (United States) Annika Penickova	(Spain) Didi Bredberg Canizares (Mexico) María Portillo Ramírez (Netherlands) Rose Marie Nijkamp (Brazil) Carolina Bohrer Martins
April 20	Orlando, United States; Clay; W15; Singles and doubles draws	(Netherlands) Rose Marie Nijkamp (Ukraine) Anita Sahdiieva; 6–7^{(4–7)}, 6–4, [10–6]	(Mexico) Midori Castillo Meza (United States) Brandelyn Fulgenzi	(Argentina) Justina María González Daniele (United States) Annika Penickova	(Spain) Didi Bredberg Canizares (Mexico) María Portillo Ramírez (Netherlands) Rose Marie Nijkamp (Brazil) Carolina Bohrer Martins
April 27	Kangaroo Cup; Gifu, Japan; Hard; W100; Singles and doubles draws	(Thailand) Mananchaya Sawangkaew; 7–6^{(7–2)}, 6–3	(Australia) Emerson Jones	(Thailand) Lanlana Tararudee (Japan) Hayu Kinoshita	Polina Iatcenko (Australia) Taylah Preston (China) Zhu Lin (Japan) Ena Koike
April 27	Kangaroo Cup; Gifu, Japan; Hard; W100; Singles and doubles draws	(United Kingdom) Harriet Dart (United Kingdom) Heather Watson; 3–6, 6–3, [10–4]	(United States) Catherine Harrison (United States) Dalayna Hewitt	(Thailand) Lanlana Tararudee (Japan) Hayu Kinoshita	Polina Iatcenko (Australia) Taylah Preston (China) Zhu Lin (Japan) Ena Koike
April 27	Wiesbaden Tennis Open; Wiesbaden, Germany; Clay; W100; Singles – Doubles	(Germany) Noma Noha Akugue; 6–2, 7–6^{(7–3)}	(Slovakia) Mia Pohánková	(Belgium) Jeline Vandromme (United Kingdom) Francesca Jones	(Austria) Sinja Kraus (Latvia) Darja Semeņistaja (Austria) Julia Grabher (Germany) Tessa Brockmann
April 27	Wiesbaden Tennis Open; Wiesbaden, Germany; Clay; W100; Singles – Doubles	(Croatia) Lucija Ćirić Bagarić (Slovenia) Nika Radišić; 5–7, 7–6^{(7–3)}, [10–5]	(Czech Republic) Lucie Havlíčková (Czech Republic) Anna Sisková	(Belgium) Jeline Vandromme (United Kingdom) Francesca Jones	(Austria) Sinja Kraus (Latvia) Darja Semeņistaja (Austria) Julia Grabher (Germany) Tessa Brockmann
April 27	FineMark Women's Pro Tennis Championship; Bonita Springs, United States; Clay; W100; Singles and doubles draws	(Spain) Ángela Fita Boluda; 6–3, 6–1	(United States) Akasha Urhobo	(United States) Madison Brengle (United States) Mary Stoiana	(Argentina) Jazmín Ortenzi (Spain) Leyre Romero Gormaz (Argentina) María Lourdes Carlé (United States) Kayla Day
April 27	FineMark Women's Pro Tennis Championship; Bonita Springs, United States; Clay; W100; Singles and doubles draws	(Ecuador) Mell Reasco González (Czech Republic) Darja Vidmanova; 7–5, 6–3	(Bulgaria) Lia Karatancheva (United States) Anna Rogers	(United States) Madison Brengle (United States) Mary Stoiana	(Argentina) Jazmín Ortenzi (Spain) Leyre Romero Gormaz (Argentina) María Lourdes Carlé (United States) Kayla Day
April 27	Lopota, Georgia; Hard; W75; Singles and doubles draws	Alexandra Shubladze; 6–3, 6–1	(United States) Vivian Wolff	(France) Amandine Hesse (Poland) Martyna Kubka	Daria Zelinskaya (India) Sahaja Yamalapalli; Darya Astakhova (Spain) Eva Guerrero Álvarez
April 27	Lopota, Georgia; Hard; W75; Singles and doubles draws	(Poland) Martyna Kubka (Czech Republic) Vendula Valdmannová; 6–2, 6–3	(India) Rutuja Bhosale (India) Ankita Raina	(France) Amandine Hesse (Poland) Martyna Kubka	Daria Zelinskaya (India) Sahaja Yamalapalli; Darya Astakhova (Spain) Eva Guerrero Álvarez
April 27	Goyang, South Korea; Hard; W35; Singles and doubles draws	(South Korea) Park So-hyun; 4–6, 6–3, 6–4	(Japan) Rinko Matsuda	(South Korea) Back Da-yeon (United States) Jaeda Daniel	(South Korea) Jang Su-jeong (United States) Malaika Rapolu (Japan) Kayo Nishimura (South Korea) Lee Eun-hye
April 27	Goyang, South Korea; Hard; W35; Singles and doubles draws	(South Korea) Back Da-yeon (United States) Jaeda Daniel; 6–4, 6–0	(South Korea) Kim Da-bin (South Korea) Park So-hyun	(South Korea) Back Da-yeon (United States) Jaeda Daniel	(South Korea) Jang Su-jeong (United States) Malaika Rapolu (Japan) Kayo Nishimura (South Korea) Lee Eun-hye
April 27	Nottingham, United Kingdom; Hard; W35; Singles and doubles draws	(United Kingdom) Lily Miyazaki; 6–3, 6–3	(United Kingdom) Emily Appleton	(Georgia (country)) Mariam Bolkvadze (Netherlands) Britt du Pree	(Latvia) Sabīne Rutlauka (India) Vaishnavi Adkar (United Kingdom) Amelia Rajecki (United Kingdom) Victoria Allen
April 27	Nottingham, United Kingdom; Hard; W35; Singles and doubles draws	(United Kingdom) Freya Christie (United Kingdom) Eden Silva; 6–1, 6–0	(Czech Republic) Aneta Laboutková (Slovenia) Kristina Novak	(Georgia (country)) Mariam Bolkvadze (Netherlands) Britt du Pree	(Latvia) Sabīne Rutlauka (India) Vaishnavi Adkar (United Kingdom) Amelia Rajecki (United Kingdom) Victoria Allen
April 27	Santa Margherita di Pula, Italy; Clay; W35; Singles and doubles draws	(Italy) Giorgia Pedone; 6–4, 6–1	(Italy) Deborah Chiesa	(France) Séléna Janicijevic (Romania) Elena Ruxandra Bertea	(Turkey) İpek Öz (Serbia) Dunja Marić (France) Tiphanie Lemaître (Serbia) Luna Vujović
April 27	Santa Margherita di Pula, Italy; Clay; W35; Singles and doubles draws	(Italy) Deborah Chiesa (Italy) Giorgia Pedone; 7–6^{(10–8)}, 6–3	(France) Séléna Janicijevic (Serbia) Natalija Senić	(France) Séléna Janicijevic (Romania) Elena Ruxandra Bertea	(Turkey) İpek Öz (Serbia) Dunja Marić (France) Tiphanie Lemaître (Serbia) Luna Vujović
April 27	Boca Raton, United States; Clay; W35; Singles and doubles draws	(United States) Amelia Honer; 7–5, 5–7, 7–5	(Argentina) Julia Riera	(Argentina) Justina María González Daniele (United States) Hibah Shaikh	(Brazil) Ana Candiotto (Spain) Alicia Herrero Liñana (Hungary) Luca Udvardy (Chile) Antonia Vergara Rivera
April 27	Boca Raton, United States; Clay; W35; Singles and doubles draws	(United States) Jordyn Hazelitt (United States) Welles Newman; 7–6^{(10–8)}, 6–3	(United States) Kailey Evans (Mexico) Jéssica Hinojosa Gómez	(Argentina) Justina María González Daniele (United States) Hibah Shaikh	(Brazil) Ana Candiotto (Spain) Alicia Herrero Liñana (Hungary) Luca Udvardy (Chile) Antonia Vergara Rivera
April 27	Lu'an, China; Hard; W15; Singles and doubles draws	(China) Wang Jiayi; 6–2, 6–2	(China) Shao Yushan	(China) Luo Xi (China) Wang Yuhan	Maria Kalyakina (China) Ma Ruoxi (Japan) Sera Nishimoto (China) An Liuyan
April 27	Lu'an, China; Hard; W15; Singles and doubles draws	(China) Chen Yiru (China) Ma Ruoxi; 7–5, 4–6, [11–9]	Maria Kalyakina (Kazakhstan) Sandugash Kenzhibayeva	(China) Luo Xi (China) Wang Yuhan	Maria Kalyakina (China) Ma Ruoxi (Japan) Sera Nishimoto (China) An Liuyan
April 27	Nakhon Pathom, Thailand; Hard; W15; Singles and doubles draws	(South Korea) Lee Gyeong-seo; 7–5, 6–7^{(4–7)}, 6–2	(Thailand) Patcharin Cheapchandej	(South Korea) Im Hee-rae (China) Liu Yuhan	(New Zealand) Aishi Das (China) Zhang Junhan (Thailand) Thasaporn Naklo (South Korea) Lee Eun-ji
April 27	Nakhon Pathom, Thailand; Hard; W15; Singles and doubles draws	(Thailand) Patcharin Cheapchandej (Thailand) Kamonwan Yodpetch; 6–3, 6–2	(Japan) Yuka Hosoki (New Zealand) Elyse Tse	(South Korea) Im Hee-rae (China) Liu Yuhan	(New Zealand) Aishi Das (China) Zhang Junhan (Thailand) Thasaporn Naklo (South Korea) Lee Eun-ji
April 27	New Delhi, India; Hard; W15; Singles and doubles draws	(India) Shruti Ahlawat; 7–5, 2–6, 7–6^{(7–3)}	(Poland) Zuzanna Kolonus	(India) Jensi Dipakbhai Kanabar; Ksenia Laskutova	(India) Zeel Desai; Arina Arifullina (India) Aditi Rawat; Elina Nepliy
April 27	New Delhi, India; Hard; W15; Singles and doubles draws	Ksenia Laskutova; Ekaterina Yashina; 6–4, 6–3	Arina Arifullina (Japan) Michika Ozeki	(India) Jensi Dipakbhai Kanabar; Ksenia Laskutova	(India) Zeel Desai; Arina Arifullina (India) Aditi Rawat; Elina Nepliy
April 27	Madrid, Spain; Hard; W15; Singles and doubles draws	(Argentina) Nadia Podoroska; 4–1 ret.	(Spain) María García Cid	(Czech Republic) Emma Slavíková (France) Marine Szostak	(Estonia) Maileen Nuudi (Kazakhstan) Asylzhan Arystanbekova (Spain) Celia Cerviño Ruiz (United States) Shannon Lam
April 27	Madrid, Spain; Hard; W15; Singles and doubles draws	(Kazakhstan) Asylzhan Arystanbekova (Kazakhstan) Ingkar Dyussebay; 6–4, 2–6, [10–6]	(Spain) Celia Cerviño Ruiz (Slovakia) Tamara Šramková	(Czech Republic) Emma Slavíková (France) Marine Szostak	(Estonia) Maileen Nuudi (Kazakhstan) Asylzhan Arystanbekova (Spain) Celia Cerviño Ruiz (United States) Shannon Lam
April 27	Oegstgeest, Netherlands; Clay; W15; Singles and doubles draws	(Czech Republic) Denisa Žoldáková; 6–1, 6–2	(Belgium) Tilwith Di Girolami	(Germany) Selina Dal (Germany) Eva Marie Voracek	(Spain) Cristina Díaz Adrover (Netherlands) Loes Ebeling Koning (Netherlands) Isis Louise van den Broek (Belgium) Kaat Coppez
April 27	Oegstgeest, Netherlands; Clay; W15; Singles and doubles draws	(Belgium) Kaat Coppez (Mexico) María Fernanda Navarro Oliva; 6–4, 6–7^{(1–7)}, [12–10]	(Sweden) Ida Johansson (Poland) Marcelina Podlińska	(Germany) Selina Dal (Germany) Eva Marie Voracek	(Spain) Cristina Díaz Adrover (Netherlands) Loes Ebeling Koning (Netherlands) Isis Louise van den Broek (Belgium) Kaat Coppez
April 27	Mbombela, South Africa; Hard; W15; Singles and doubles draws	(France) Dune Vaissaud; 6–3, 7–5	(Serbia) Darja Suvirdjonkova	(Netherlands) Coco Bosman (Turkey) İrem Kurt	(China) Mi Lan; Polina Kaibekova (Turkey) Selina Atay (Germany) Ann Akasha Ceuca
April 27	Mbombela, South Africa; Hard; W15; Singles and doubles draws	(Germany) Ann Akasha Ceuca (China) Mi Lan; 6–3, 7–6^{(7–4)}	Polina Kaibekova (Switzerland) Josephine Kunz	(Netherlands) Coco Bosman (Turkey) İrem Kurt	(China) Mi Lan; Polina Kaibekova (Turkey) Selina Atay (Germany) Ann Akasha Ceuca
April 27	Hurghada, Egypt; Hard; W15; Singles and doubles draws	Ekaterina Tupitsyna; 6–2, 6–3	(Egypt) Nada Fouad	Valeriia Iushchenko; Ustiniya Lekomtseva	Sofia Martianova (France) Andrea Lola Popovic; Anna Snigireva; Ekaterina Khodzhaeva
April 27	Hurghada, Egypt; Hard; W15; Singles and doubles draws	(Ukraine) Kateryna Lazarenko (Turkey) Doğa Türkmen; 6–4, 6–1	(Austria) Claudia Gasparovic (Austria) Leonie Rabl	Valeriia Iushchenko; Ustiniya Lekomtseva	Sofia Martianova (France) Andrea Lola Popovic; Anna Snigireva; Ekaterina Khodzhaeva
April 27	Monastir, Tunisia; Hard; W15; Singles and doubles draws	(Spain) María Oliver Sánchez; 6–1, 6–1	(Italy) Francesca Gandolfi	(Romania) Bianca Bărbulescu (France) Laïa Petretic	(France) Yasmine Mansouri; Anna Shkutova (Croatia) Karla Popović (Argentina) Luciana Moyano
April 27	Monastir, Tunisia; Hard; W15; Singles and doubles draws	(Finland) Clarissa Blomqvist (Croatia) Karla Popović; 6–3, 6–2	(Spain) María Oliver Sánchez (Italy) Aurora Urso	(Romania) Bianca Bărbulescu (France) Laïa Petretic	(France) Yasmine Mansouri; Anna Shkutova (Croatia) Karla Popović (Argentina) Luciana Moyano

=== May ===
Week of	Tournament	Winner	Runners-up	Semifinalists	Quarterfinalists
May 4	Revolution Technologies Pro Tennis Classic; Indian Harbour Beach, United States; Clay (green); W100; Singles and doubles draws	Kristina Liutova; 6–1, 6–7^{(4–7)}, 6–3	(Argentina) Julia Riera	(Czech Republic) Darja Vidmanova (Argentina) Jazmín Ortenzi	(Netherlands) Eva Vedder (Spain) Leyre Romero Gormaz (Netherlands) Arantxa Rus (United States) Elvina Kalieva
May 4	Revolution Technologies Pro Tennis Classic; Indian Harbour Beach, United States; Clay (green); W100; Singles and doubles draws	(United States) Anna Rogers (United States) Allura Zamarripa; 6–3, 6–0	(Estonia) Ingrid Neel (United States) Abigail Rencheli	(Czech Republic) Darja Vidmanova (Argentina) Jazmín Ortenzi	(Netherlands) Eva Vedder (Spain) Leyre Romero Gormaz (Netherlands) Arantxa Rus (United States) Elvina Kalieva
May 4	Open Saint-Gaudens Occitanie; Saint-Gaudens, France; Clay; W75; Singles and doubles draws	(Spain) Kaitlin Quevedo; 6–3, 6–2	(Spain) Andrea Lázaro García	(France) Jessika Ponchet (Japan) Himeno Sakatsume	(Poland) Maja Chwalińska (Serbia) Teodora Kostović (Sweden) Caijsa Hennemann (Ukraine) Katarina Zavatska
May 4	Open Saint-Gaudens Occitanie; Saint-Gaudens, France; Clay; W75; Singles and doubles draws	(Sweden) Caijsa Hennemann (Sweden) Lisa Zaar; 6–7^{(5–7)}, 7–5, [10–7]	(Brazil) Ingrid Martins; Ekaterina Ovcharenko	(France) Jessika Ponchet (Japan) Himeno Sakatsume	(Poland) Maja Chwalińska (Serbia) Teodora Kostović (Sweden) Caijsa Hennemann (Ukraine) Katarina Zavatska
May 4	Lopota, Georgia; Hard; W50; Singles and doubles draws	(Czech Republic) Vendula Valdmannová; 4–6, 6–4, 6–0	(United States) Carolyn Ansari	(Poland) Martyna Kubka (Israel) Lina Glushko	Maria Golovina; Darya Astakhova (United States) Vivian Wolff (Bulgaria) Rositsa Dencheva
May 4	Lopota, Georgia; Hard; W50; Singles and doubles draws	Maria Golovina; Ekaterina Maklakova; 6–4, 6–3	Vitalia Diatchenko; Alina Yuneva	(Poland) Martyna Kubka (Israel) Lina Glushko	Maria Golovina; Darya Astakhova (United States) Vivian Wolff (Bulgaria) Rositsa Dencheva
May 4	Fukuoka International Women's Cup; Fukuoka, Japan; Carpet; W35; Singles and doubles draws	(United Kingdom) Katie Swan; 6–1, 6–3	(Japan) Rina Saigo	(Switzerland) Valentina Ryser (Japan) Yuno Kitahara	(Japan) Ayumi Miyamoto (Japan) Remika Ohashi (Japan) Sera Nishimoto (Japan) Shiho Tsujioka
May 4	Fukuoka International Women's Cup; Fukuoka, Japan; Carpet; W35; Singles and doubles draws	(Japan) Ayumi Miyamoto (Japan) Hikaru Sato; 6–1, 6–4	(Japan) Mayuka Aikawa (Japan) Natsuki Yoshimoto	(Switzerland) Valentina Ryser (Japan) Yuno Kitahara	(Japan) Ayumi Miyamoto (Japan) Remika Ohashi (Japan) Sera Nishimoto (Japan) Shiho Tsujioka
May 4	Changwon, South Korea; Hard; W35; Singles and doubles draws	(United States) Hanna Chang; 6–4, 7–6^{(7–2)}	(Japan) Ena Koike	(South Korea) Back Da-yeon (South Korea) Lee Su-ha	(Japan) Yuki Naito (Chinese Taipei) Lee Ya-hsuan (China) Guo Meiqi (Japan) Kayo Nishimura
May 4	Changwon, South Korea; Hard; W35; Singles and doubles draws	(South Korea) Back Da-yeon (China) Guo Meiqi; 7–5, 7–5	(United States) Hanna Chang (South Korea) Jang Ga-eul	(South Korea) Back Da-yeon (South Korea) Lee Su-ha	(Japan) Yuki Naito (Chinese Taipei) Lee Ya-hsuan (China) Guo Meiqi (Japan) Kayo Nishimura
May 4	Tumkur, India; Hard; W35; Singles and doubles draws	(Lithuania) Justina Mikulskytė; 1–0 ret.	(Poland) Zuzanna Pawlikowska	(India) Vaidehi Chaudhari (India) Zeel Desai	Ksenia Laskutova; Ekaterina Yashina; Arina Arifullina; Elina Nepliy
May 4	Tumkur, India; Hard; W35; Singles and doubles draws	Ksenia Laskutova; Elina Nepliy; Walkover	(India) Vaidehi Chaudhari (Poland) Zuzanna Pawlikowska	(India) Vaidehi Chaudhari (India) Zeel Desai	Ksenia Laskutova; Ekaterina Yashina; Arina Arifullina; Elina Nepliy
May 4	Nottingham, United Kingdom; Hard; W35; Singles and doubles draws	(United Kingdom) Alicia Dudeney; 6–3, 7–5	(United Kingdom) Emily Appleton	(Belgium) Jana Otzipka (United States) Julia Adams	(United Kingdom) Esther Adeshina (Lithuania) Andrė Lukošiūtė (United Kingdom) Amelia Rajecki (United Kingdom) Eliz Maloney
May 4	Nottingham, United Kingdom; Hard; W35; Singles and doubles draws	(United Kingdom) Freya Christie (Slovenia) Kristina Novak; 6–4, 6–2	(United Kingdom) Victoria Allen (United Kingdom) Amelia Rajecki	(Belgium) Jana Otzipka (United States) Julia Adams	(United Kingdom) Esther Adeshina (Lithuania) Andrė Lukošiūtė (United Kingdom) Amelia Rajecki (United Kingdom) Eliz Maloney
May 4	Platja d'Aro, Spain; Clay; W35; Singles and doubles draws	(Spain) Ane Mintegi del Olmo; 6–0, 6–3	(Burundi) Sada Nahimana	(Malta) Francesca Curmi (Argentina) Luisina Giovannini	(Greece) Despina Papamichail (Portugal) Matilde Jorge (Slovenia) Polona Hercog (Turkey) İpek Öz
May 4	Platja d'Aro, Spain; Clay; W35; Singles and doubles draws	(Netherlands) Loes Ebeling Koning (Netherlands) Isis Louise van den Broek; 7–5, 6–4	(Netherlands) Britt du Pree (Netherlands) Sarah van Emst	(Malta) Francesca Curmi (Argentina) Luisina Giovannini	(Greece) Despina Papamichail (Portugal) Matilde Jorge (Slovenia) Polona Hercog (Turkey) İpek Öz
May 4	Santa Margherita di Pula, Italy; Clay; W35; Singles and doubles draws	(Italy) Verena Meliss; 6–2, 6–2	(Ukraine) Anastasiia Sobolieva	(Italy) Camilla Gennaro (Finland) Laura Hietaranta	(Latvia) Beatrise Zeltiņa (Italy) Arianna Zucchini (Romania) Oana Georgeta Simion (Romania) Elena Ruxandra Bertea
May 4	Santa Margherita di Pula, Italy; Clay; W35; Singles and doubles draws	(Ukraine) Anastasiia Sobolieva (Latvia) Beatrise Zeltiņa; 6–4, 6–1	(Romania) Elena Ruxandra Bertea (Switzerland) Katerina Tsygourova	(Italy) Camilla Gennaro (Finland) Laura Hietaranta	(Latvia) Beatrise Zeltiņa (Italy) Arianna Zucchini (Romania) Oana Georgeta Simion (Romania) Elena Ruxandra Bertea
May 4	Monastir, Tunisia; Hard; W35; Singles and doubles draws	Victoria Milovanova; 6–2, 2–6, 6–4	(France) Yasmine Mansouri	(Mexico) Lya Fernández (Italy) Viola Turini	(Lithuania) Iveta Dapkutė (Australia) Eva Lopez (Austria) Ava Schueller (Argentina) Nadia Podoroska
May 4	Monastir, Tunisia; Hard; W35; Singles and doubles draws	(Poland) Weronika Falkowska (Slovakia) Katarína Kužmová; 6–4, 6–3	(France) Yasmine Mansouri (Serbia) Elena Milovanović	(Mexico) Lya Fernández (Italy) Viola Turini	(Lithuania) Iveta Dapkutė (Australia) Eva Lopez (Austria) Ava Schueller (Argentina) Nadia Podoroska
May 4	Boca Raton, United States; Clay; W35; Singles and doubles draws	(Argentina) Justina María González Daniele; 6–4, 6–4	(United States) Carson Tanguilig	(United States) Dasha Ivanova (Argentina) Luna María Cinalli	(United Kingdom) Hannah Klugman (Chile) Fernanda Labraña (United States) Capucine Jauffret (Italy) Sofia Rocchetti
May 4	Boca Raton, United States; Clay; W35; Singles and doubles draws	(United States) Capucine Jauffret (United States) Annika Penickova; 6–1, 6–2	(United States) Dasha Ivanova (Canada) Alexandra Vagramov	(United States) Dasha Ivanova (Argentina) Luna María Cinalli	(United Kingdom) Hannah Klugman (Chile) Fernanda Labraña (United States) Capucine Jauffret (Italy) Sofia Rocchetti
May 4	Lu'an, China; Hard; W15; Singles and doubles draws	(Sweden) Tiana Tian Deng; 6–4, 4–0 ret.	(China) Zou Ruirui	Alina Tikhonova (China) Luo Xi	Maria Kalyakina (South Korea) Ahn Yu-jin (China) Li Yuyao (China) Wang Jiayi
May 4	Lu'an, China; Hard; W15; Singles and doubles draws	(South Korea) Kim Na-ri (China) Xu Jiayu; 2–6, 6–2, [10–6]	(South Korea) Ahn Yu-jin (China) Aitiyaguli Aixirefu	Alina Tikhonova (China) Luo Xi	Maria Kalyakina (South Korea) Ahn Yu-jin (China) Li Yuyao (China) Wang Jiayi
May 4	Nakhon Pathom, Thailand; Hard; W15; Singles and doubles draws	(Thailand) Patcharin Cheapchandej; 4–6, 6–3, 6–1	(China) Liu Yuhan	(Japan) Erika Sema (Thailand) Kamonwan Yodpetch	(Japan) Naho Sato (New Zealand) Monique Barry (South Korea) Lee Gyeong-seo (South Korea) Im Hee-rae
May 4	Nakhon Pathom, Thailand; Hard; W15; Singles and doubles draws	(Thailand) Anchisa Chanta (Thailand) Thasaporn Naklo; 6–2, 6–1	(South Korea) Im Hee-rae (South Korea) Kim Eun-chae	(Japan) Erika Sema (Thailand) Kamonwan Yodpetch	(Japan) Naho Sato (New Zealand) Monique Barry (South Korea) Lee Gyeong-seo (South Korea) Im Hee-rae
May 4	Reichstett, France; Clay; W15; Singles and doubles draws	(Germany) Valentina Steiner; 6–3, 4–6, 6–0	(Croatia) Iva Primorac Pavičić	(Germany) Luisa Meyer auf der Heide (France) Sarah Iliev	(France) Océane Babel (France) Mathilde Lollia (France) Myrtille Georges (France) Liv Boulard
May 4	Reichstett, France; Clay; W15; Singles and doubles draws	(France) Liv Boulard (France) Milena Ciocan; 6–4, 6–3	(France) Myrtille Georges (France) Evita Ramirez	(Germany) Luisa Meyer auf der Heide (France) Sarah Iliev	(France) Océane Babel (France) Mathilde Lollia (France) Myrtille Georges (France) Liv Boulard
May 4	Kalmar, Sweden; Clay; W15; Singles and doubles draws	(Sweden) Sara Dahlström; 6–3, 6–2	(Sweden) Linea Bajraliu	(Croatia) Karla Popović (Netherlands) Klara Veldman	(Norway) Matylda Burylo (Sweden) Iva Marinkovic (Netherlands) Madelief Hageman (Ukraine) Daria Yesypchuk
May 4	Kalmar, Sweden; Clay; W15; Singles and doubles draws	(Netherlands) Rikke de Koning (Netherlands) Madelief Hageman; 4–6, 6–1, [10–8]	(Sweden) Ida Johansson (Denmark) Rebecca Munk Mortensen	(Croatia) Karla Popović (Netherlands) Klara Veldman	(Norway) Matylda Burylo (Sweden) Iva Marinkovic (Netherlands) Madelief Hageman (Ukraine) Daria Yesypchuk
May 4	Belgrade, Serbia; Clay; W15; Singles and doubles draws	(Slovakia) Nina Vargová; 6–2, 6–1	(Romania) Briana Szabó	(Slovenia) Alja Senica (Serbia) Anja Stanković	(Serbia) Natalija Senić (Serbia) Gala Ivanović (United States) Mia Horvit (Serbia) Dunja Marić
May 4	Belgrade, Serbia; Clay; W15; Singles and doubles draws	(Serbia) Natalija Senić (Serbia) Anja Stanković; 6–2, 7–5	(Slovenia) Alja Senica (Romania) Briana Szabó	(Slovenia) Alja Senica (Serbia) Anja Stanković	(Serbia) Natalija Senić (Serbia) Gala Ivanović (United States) Mia Horvit (Serbia) Dunja Marić
May 4	Mbombela, South Africa; Hard; W15; Singles and doubles draws	(Germany) Ann Akasha Ceuca; 7–6^{(7–4)}, 6–3	(France) Dune Vaissaud	(China) Mi Lan (Italy) Sofia Avataneo	(Serbia) Darja Suvirdjonkova (South Africa) Danielle Dai Chapman (New Caledonia) Leilany Ipunesso (Israel) Maayan Laron
May 4	Mbombela, South Africa; Hard; W15; Singles and doubles draws	(Netherlands) Coco Bosman (Switzerland) Josephine Kunz; 6–1, 6–2	(Australia) Elizabeth Ivanov (United States) Tia Messerli	(China) Mi Lan (Italy) Sofia Avataneo	(Serbia) Darja Suvirdjonkova (South Africa) Danielle Dai Chapman (New Caledonia) Leilany Ipunesso (Israel) Maayan Laron
May 4	Hurghada, Egypt; Hard; W15; Singles and doubles draws	Ekaterina Tupitsyna; 6–4, 6–0	(Italy) Noemi Maines	(Egypt) Sandra Samir (Egypt) Lamis Alhussein Abdel Aziz	Ustiniya Lekomtseva; Valeriia Iushchenko (Ukraine) Kateryna Lazarenko; Anna Snigireva
May 4	Hurghada, Egypt; Hard; W15; Singles and doubles draws	(Egypt) Lamis Alhussein Abdel Aziz (Ukraine) Kateryna Lazarenko; 6–2, 6–2	(Denmark) Sarafina Olivia Hansen (Turkey) Doğa Türkmen	(Egypt) Sandra Samir (Egypt) Lamis Alhussein Abdel Aziz	Ustiniya Lekomtseva; Valeriia Iushchenko (Ukraine) Kateryna Lazarenko; Anna Snigireva
May 11	Kurume Cup; Kurume, Japan; Carpet; W75; Singles – Doubles	(United Kingdom) Katie Swan; 7–5, 6–1	(Japan) Kyōka Okamura	(Japan) Mei Yamaguchi (Japan) Momoko Kobori	(Japan) Sara Saito (Australia) Lizette Cabrera (Japan) Mio Mushika (Japan) Natsumi Kawaguchi
May 11	Kurume Cup; Kurume, Japan; Carpet; W75; Singles – Doubles	(Chinese Taipei) Lee Ya-hsin (China) Ye Qiuyu; 6–3, 6–2	(Australia) Gabriella Da Silva-Fick (Australia) Tenika McGiffin	(Japan) Mei Yamaguchi (Japan) Momoko Kobori	(Japan) Sara Saito (Australia) Lizette Cabrera (Japan) Mio Mushika (Japan) Natsumi Kawaguchi
May 11	Empire Slovak Open; Trnava, Slovakia; Clay; W75; Singles and doubles draws	(United States) Claire Liu; 6–7^{(0–7)}, 7–6^{(7–4)}, 7–6^{(7–5)}	(Czech Republic) Anna Sisková	(Japan) Mai Hontama (Argentina) Luisina Giovannini	(Finland) Laura Hietaranta (Ukraine) Anastasiia Sobolieva (Germany) Caroline Werner (Netherlands) Anouk Koevermans
May 11	Empire Slovak Open; Trnava, Slovakia; Clay; W75; Singles and doubles draws	(Finland) Laura Hietaranta (Slovakia) Nina Vargová; 6–2, 6–3	(Spain) María Martínez Vaquero (Spain) Alba Rey García	(Japan) Mai Hontama (Argentina) Luisina Giovannini	(Finland) Laura Hietaranta (Ukraine) Anastasiia Sobolieva (Germany) Caroline Werner (Netherlands) Anouk Koevermans
May 11	Zagreb Open; Zagreb, Croatia; W75; Singles and doubles draws	Erika Andreeva; 6–3, 3–6, 6–3	(Germany) Ella Seidel	(Sweden) Kajsa Rinaldo Persson (Burundi) Sada Nahimana	(Sweden) Caijsa Hennemann (Slovenia) Polona Hercog (Sweden) Lisa Zaar (Netherlands) Anouck Vrancken Peeters
May 11	Zagreb Open; Zagreb, Croatia; W75; Singles and doubles draws	(Switzerland) Naïma Karamoko (Croatia) Tara Würth; 3–6, 7–6^{(7–4)}, [10–5]	(Romania) Briana Szabó (Latvia) Beatrise Zeltiņa	(Sweden) Kajsa Rinaldo Persson (Burundi) Sada Nahimana	(Sweden) Caijsa Hennemann (Slovenia) Polona Hercog (Sweden) Lisa Zaar (Netherlands) Anouck Vrancken Peeters
May 11	Andong, South Korea; Hard; W35; Singles and doubles draws	(South Korea) Back Da-yeon; 3–6, 6–2, 6–0	(South Korea) Jeong Bo-young	(Japan) Reina Goto; Sofya Lansere	(India) Vaidehi Chaudhari (United States) Malaika Rapolu (Japan) Yuki Naito (United States) Hanna Chang
May 11	Andong, South Korea; Hard; W35; Singles and doubles draws	(South Korea) Back Da-yeon (South Korea) Jang Su-jeong; 6–4, 6–3	(South Korea) Jeong Bo-young (South Korea) Park So-hyun	(Japan) Reina Goto; Sofya Lansere	(India) Vaidehi Chaudhari (United States) Malaika Rapolu (Japan) Yuki Naito (United States) Hanna Chang
May 11	Båstad, Sweden; Clay; W35; Singles and doubles draws	(Netherlands) Britt du Pree; 6–1, 6–1	(Turkey) Çağla Büyükakçay	(Denmark) Emma Kamper (Sweden) Lea Nilsson	Alevtina Ibragimova (Sweden) Linea Bajraliu (Malta) Francesca Curmi (Sweden) Isabel Skoog
May 11	Båstad, Sweden; Clay; W35; Singles and doubles draws	(Netherlands) Britt du Pree (Netherlands) Sarah van Emst; 6–4, 4–3 ret.	(Mexico) María Fernanda Navarro Oliva (Colombia) María Paulina Pérez García	(Denmark) Emma Kamper (Sweden) Lea Nilsson	Alevtina Ibragimova (Sweden) Linea Bajraliu (Malta) Francesca Curmi (Sweden) Isabel Skoog
May 11	Hurghada, Egypt; Hard; W35; Singles and doubles draws	(Italy) Camilla Zanolini; 2–6, 6–2, 6–3	Ekaterina Maklakova	Ulyana Hrabavets; Elina Nepliy	(Egypt) Nada Fouad (Norway) Malene Helgø (Ukraine) Valeriya Strakhova (Egypt) Sandra Samir
May 11	Hurghada, Egypt; Hard; W35; Singles and doubles draws	(Egypt) Lamis Alhussein Abdel Aziz (Italy) Camilla Zanolini; 1–6, 6–3, [11–9]	Ekaterina Maklakova; Elina Nepliy	Ulyana Hrabavets; Elina Nepliy	(Egypt) Nada Fouad (Norway) Malene Helgø (Ukraine) Valeriya Strakhova (Egypt) Sandra Samir
May 11	Monastir, Tunisia; Hard; W35; Singles and doubles draws	(Serbia) Elena Milovanović; 6–1, 7–5	(United States) Carolyn Ansari	Victoria Milovanova (Slovakia) Katarína Kužmová	Kira Pavlova (Hong Kong) Adithya Karunaratne (United States) Clervie Ngounoue (France) Mathilde Lollia
May 11	Monastir, Tunisia; Hard; W35; Singles and doubles draws	(Argentina) Luciana Moyano (France) Laïa Petretic; 6–3, 6–3	(Italy) Lavinia Luciano (Italy) Matilde Mariani	Victoria Milovanova (Slovakia) Katarína Kužmová	Kira Pavlova (Hong Kong) Adithya Karunaratne (United States) Clervie Ngounoue (France) Mathilde Lollia
May 11	Bethany Beach, United States; Clay; W35; Singles and doubles draws	(United States) Eryn Cayetano; 7–5, 6–1	(United States) Madison Brengle	(United States) Kylie Collins (United States) Bella Payne	(Georgia (country)) Sofia Shapatava (Argentina) María Florencia Urrutia (United Kingdom) Hannah Klugman (United States) Savannah Broadus
May 11	Bethany Beach, United States; Clay; W35; Singles and doubles draws	(United States) Savannah Broadus (United States) Kylie Collins; 6–0, 7–5	(United States) Eryn Cayetano (United States) Haley Giavara	(United States) Kylie Collins (United States) Bella Payne	(Georgia (country)) Sofia Shapatava (Argentina) María Florencia Urrutia (United Kingdom) Hannah Klugman (United States) Savannah Broadus
May 11	Toyama, Japan; Hard; W15; Singles and doubles draws	(Japan) Kanon Sawashiro; 6–2, 6–3	(Japan) Shiho Tsujioka	(Hong Kong) Shek Cheuk-ying (Chinese Taipei) Tsao Chia-yi	(Japan) Honori Koyama (Singapore) Eva Marie Desvignes (Japan) Lisa Kamigata (Japan) Sae Noguchi
May 11	Toyama, Japan; Hard; W15; Singles and doubles draws	(Japan) Amane Hattori (Japan) Minami Suzuki; 1–6, 6–3, [10–5]	(Japan) Yuzuha Negishi (Japan) Kurumi Tamura	(Hong Kong) Shek Cheuk-ying (Chinese Taipei) Tsao Chia-yi	(Japan) Honori Koyama (Singapore) Eva Marie Desvignes (Japan) Lisa Kamigata (Japan) Sae Noguchi
May 11	Lu'an, China; Hard; W15; Singles and doubles draws	Alina Tikhonova; 5–7, 6–1, 6–0	(China) Wang Jiayi	(China) Luo Xi (China) Ye Shiyu	(Kazakhstan) Sandugash Kenzhibayeva (China) Jiang Zijun (South Korea) Park Eun-yeong (South Korea) Ahn Yu-jin
May 11	Lu'an, China; Hard; W15; Singles and doubles draws	(China) Hou Yanan (China) Wang Meiling; 4–6, 6–3, [10–8]	(China) Luo Xi (China) Wang Jiayi	(China) Luo Xi (China) Ye Shiyu	(Kazakhstan) Sandugash Kenzhibayeva (China) Jiang Zijun (South Korea) Park Eun-yeong (South Korea) Ahn Yu-jin
May 11	Nakhon Pathom, Thailand; Hard; W15; Singles and doubles draws	(South Korea) Lee Gyeong-seo; 6–3, 6–3	(Thailand) Anchisa Chanta	(Thailand) Patcharin Cheapchandej (China) Zhang Junhan	(New Zealand) Elyse Tse (Thailand) Thasaporn Naklo (Japan) Naho Sato (New Zealand) Monique Barry
May 11	Nakhon Pathom, Thailand; Hard; W15; Singles and doubles draws	(Thailand) Lunda Kumhom (Thailand) Kamonwan Yodpetch; 7–5, 6–7^{(4–7)}, [10–7]	(Thailand) Anchisa Chanta (Thailand) Thasaporn Naklo	(Thailand) Patcharin Cheapchandej (China) Zhang Junhan	(New Zealand) Elyse Tse (Thailand) Thasaporn Naklo (Japan) Naho Sato (New Zealand) Monique Barry
May 11	Torneo Conchita Martínez; Monzón, Spain; Hard; W15; Singles and doubles draws	(United States) Shannon Lam; 6–4, 6–4	(Ukraine) Anastasiia Firman	(Spain) Esther Lopez Alcaraz (Spain) Berta Miret Avante	(United Kingdom) Alice Gillan (France) Marine Szostak (Spain) Carmen Gallardo Guevara (Spain) Marta Soriano Santiago
May 11	Torneo Conchita Martínez; Monzón, Spain; Hard; W15; Singles and doubles draws	(Ukraine) Anastasiia Firman (China) Liu Min; 4–6, 7–5, [10–6]	(Spain) Isabel Pascual Montalvo (United States) Kate Sharabura	(Spain) Esther Lopez Alcaraz (Spain) Berta Miret Avante	(United Kingdom) Alice Gillan (France) Marine Szostak (Spain) Carmen Gallardo Guevara (Spain) Marta Soriano Santiago
May 11	Klagenfurt, Austria; Clay; W15; Singles and doubles draws	(Slovenia) Pia Lovrič; 4–6, 6–4, 6–4	(Italy) Martina Colmegna	(Switzerland) Katerina Tsygourova (Italy) Camilla Gennaro	(Czech Republic) Linda Ševčíková (Romania) Ștefania Bojică (Austria) Ava Schueller (Czech Republic) Denisa Žoldáková
May 11	Klagenfurt, Austria; Clay; W15; Singles and doubles draws	(Romania) Ștefania Bojică (Slovenia) Alja Senica; 7–5, 7–5	(Austria) Claudia Gasparovic (Austria) Leonie Rabl	(Switzerland) Katerina Tsygourova (Italy) Camilla Gennaro	(Czech Republic) Linda Ševčíková (Romania) Ștefania Bojică (Austria) Ava Schueller (Czech Republic) Denisa Žoldáková
May 11	Bucharest, Romania; Clay; W15; Singles and doubles draws	Felitsata Dorofeeva-Rybas; 6–4, 4–6, 7–5	Valeriia Artemeva	(Romania) Cristiana Nicoleta Todoni (Italy) Angelica Raggi	(Romania) Maria Sara Popa (Italy) Francesca Gandolfi (Romania) Bianca Bărbulescu (Romania) Giulia Safina Popa
May 11	Bucharest, Romania; Clay; W15; Singles and doubles draws	(Romania) Bianca Bărbulescu (Norway) Astrid Brune Olsen; 6–3, 6–2	(Romania) Alexandra Irina Anghel (Romania) Simona Ogescu	(Romania) Cristiana Nicoleta Todoni (Italy) Angelica Raggi	(Romania) Maria Sara Popa (Italy) Francesca Gandolfi (Romania) Bianca Bărbulescu (Romania) Giulia Safina Popa
May 11	Kuršumlijska Banja, Serbia; Clay; W15; Singles and doubles draws	(Switzerland) Marie Mettraux; 6–2, 6–4	(Italy) Chiara Fornasieri	Anastasia Lizunova (China) Jialin Tian	(Serbia) Andrea Obradović (Montenegro) Tea Nikčević (Serbia) Masa Janković (Bulgaria) Julia Stamatova
May 11	Kuršumlijska Banja, Serbia; Clay; W15; Singles and doubles draws	(Switzerland) Marie Mettraux (China) Jialin Tian; 7–5, 6–1	(Belgium) Kaat Coppez (Ukraine) Anastasiya Zaparyniuk	Anastasia Lizunova (China) Jialin Tian	(Serbia) Andrea Obradović (Montenegro) Tea Nikčević (Serbia) Masa Janković (Bulgaria) Julia Stamatova
May 11	Gaborone, Botswana; Hard; W15; Singles and doubles draws	(China) Mi Lan; 6–3, 1–6, 6–4	(Israel) Maayan Laron	Ksenia Laskutova (Denmark) Elena Jamshidi	(Serbia) Darja Suvirdjonkova (Australia) Elizabeth Ivanov (Mexico) Sabastiani León (Italy) Maddalena Giordano
May 11	Gaborone, Botswana; Hard; W15; Singles and doubles draws	(Mexico) Sabastiani León (Poland) Dominika Podhajecka; 7–6^{(10–8)}, 6–2	(Italy) Sofia Avataneo (Germany) Luisa Hrda	Ksenia Laskutova (Denmark) Elena Jamshidi	(Serbia) Darja Suvirdjonkova (Australia) Elizabeth Ivanov (Mexico) Sabastiani León (Italy) Maddalena Giordano
May 18	Takasaki Open; Takasaki, Japan; Hard; W100; Singles – Doubles	(Japan) Yuki Naito; 6–4, 6–3	(Switzerland) Valentina Ryser	(Japan) Momoko Kobori (Japan) Haruka Kaji	(Japan) Hikaru Sato (Cyprus) Raluca Șerban (Japan) Rina Saigo (Japan) Hayu Kinoshita
May 18	Takasaki Open; Takasaki, Japan; Hard; W100; Singles – Doubles	(Japan) Ayano Shimizu (Japan) Eri Shimizu; 6–1, 6–4	(Chinese Taipei) Lee Ya-hsin (Hong Kong) Cody Wong	(Japan) Momoko Kobori (Japan) Haruka Kaji	(Japan) Hikaru Sato (Cyprus) Raluca Șerban (Japan) Rina Saigo (Japan) Hayu Kinoshita
May 18	Slovak Open; Košice, Slovakia; Clay; W75; Singles and doubles draws	(Italy) Tyra Caterina Grant; 6–3, 6–3	(Germany) Caroline Werner	(Poland) Martyna Kubka (Lithuania) Justina Mikulskytė	Erika Andreeva (Slovakia) Nina Vargová (Sweden) Kajsa Rinaldo Persson (Croatia) Lucija Ćirić Bagarić
May 18	Slovak Open; Košice, Slovakia; Clay; W75; Singles and doubles draws	(Romania) Irina Bara (United Kingdom) Madeleine Brooks; 7–5, 6–2	(Poland) Martyna Kubka (Lithuania) Justina Mikulskytė	(Poland) Martyna Kubka (Lithuania) Justina Mikulskytė	Erika Andreeva (Slovakia) Nina Vargová (Sweden) Kajsa Rinaldo Persson (Croatia) Lucija Ćirić Bagarić
May 18	Portorož, Slovenia; Clay; W50; Singles and doubles draws	(Czech Republic) Julie Štruplová; 6–3, 6–3	(Malta) Francesca Curmi	(Turkey) İpek Öz (Spain) Carlota Martínez Círez	(Netherlands) Eva Vedder (Serbia) Dunja Marić (Hungary) Amarissa Tóth (Slovenia) Dalila Jakupović
May 18	Portorož, Slovenia; Clay; W50; Singles and doubles draws	(Italy) Angelica Moratelli; Anastasia Tikhonova; 3–6, 6–3, [10–4]	Alevtina Ibragimova (Hungary) Amarissa Tóth	(Turkey) İpek Öz (Spain) Carlota Martínez Círez	(Netherlands) Eva Vedder (Serbia) Dunja Marić (Hungary) Amarissa Tóth (Slovenia) Dalila Jakupović
May 18	Pelham Racquet Club Pro Classic; Pelham, United States; Clay; W50; Singles and doubles draws	(United States) Madison Brengle; 6–1, 6–4	(United States) Katrina Scott	(United States) Savannah Broadus (United States) Bella Payne	(Argentina) María Florencia Urrutia (United States) Amelia Honer (Chile) Antonia Vergara Rivera (Peru) Dana Guzmán
May 18	Pelham Racquet Club Pro Classic; Pelham, United States; Clay; W50; Singles and doubles draws	(Spain) Alicia Herrero Liñana (United States) Anna Rogers; 6–2, 6–1	(United States) Kaitlyn Carnicella (United States) Capucine Jauffret	(United States) Savannah Broadus (United States) Bella Payne	(Argentina) María Florencia Urrutia (United States) Amelia Honer (Chile) Antonia Vergara Rivera (Peru) Dana Guzmán
May 18	Changwon, South Korea; Hard; W35; Singles and doubles draws	(South Korea) Back Da-yeon; 6–1, 6–2	(South Korea) Lee Ha-eum	(China) Lu Jiajing (South Korea) Kim Da-bin	(Japan) Reina Goto (Japan) Naho Sato (South Korea) Jang Gio; Arina Varaksina
May 18	Changwon, South Korea; Hard; W35; Singles and doubles draws	(South Korea) Im Hee-rae (South Korea) Kim Eun-chae; 6–4, 2–6, [10–3]	(South Korea) Kim Da-bin (South Korea) Lee Ha-eum	(China) Lu Jiajing (South Korea) Kim Da-bin	(Japan) Reina Goto (Japan) Naho Sato (South Korea) Jang Gio; Arina Varaksina
May 18	Wuning, China; Hard; W35; Singles and doubles draws	Alexandra Shubladze; 6–2, 6–3	(China) Yang Yidi	(China) Li Zongyu (China) Sun Yingqun	(China) Yuan Chengyiyi (China) Yao Xinxin; Ekaterina Yashina (Thailand) Patcharin Cheapchandej
May 18	Wuning, China; Hard; W35; Singles and doubles draws	(China) Huang Yujia (China) Zhang Ying; 3–6, 6–2, [10–7]	(New Zealand) Monique Barry (China) Yuan Chengyiyi	(China) Li Zongyu (China) Sun Yingqun	(China) Yuan Chengyiyi (China) Yao Xinxin; Ekaterina Yashina (Thailand) Patcharin Cheapchandej
May 18	Estepona, Spain; Hard; W35; Singles and doubles draws	(United Kingdom) Alicia Dudeney; 6–1, 3–6, 6–2	(France) Nahia Berecoechea	(Netherlands) Stéphanie Visscher (United Kingdom) Alice Gillan	(Canada) Ariana Arseneault (Latvia) Sabīne Rutlauka (Spain) Carmen Gallardo Guevara (United Kingdom) Indianna Spink
May 18	Estepona, Spain; Hard; W35; Singles and doubles draws	(Canada) Ariana Arseneault (United Kingdom) Alicia Dudeney; 6–4, 7–5	(France) Nahia Berecoechea (Poland) Zuzanna Pawlikowska	(Netherlands) Stéphanie Visscher (United Kingdom) Alice Gillan	(Canada) Ariana Arseneault (Latvia) Sabīne Rutlauka (Spain) Carmen Gallardo Guevara (United Kingdom) Indianna Spink
May 18	Klagenfurt, Austria; Clay; W35; Singles and doubles draws	(Netherlands) Sarah van Emst; 3–6, 7–5, 6–2	(Germany) Nastasja Schunk	(Germany) Eva Marie Voracek (Italy) Alessandra Mazzola	(Netherlands) Jasmijn Gimbrère (Greece) Sapfo Sakellaridi (Czech Republic) Aneta Laboutková (Netherlands) Britt du Pree
May 18	Klagenfurt, Austria; Clay; W35; Singles and doubles draws	(Netherlands) Jasmijn Gimbrère (Greece) Sapfo Sakellaridi; 6–0, 6–0	(Bulgaria) Denislava Glushkova (Austria) Mavie Österreicher	(Germany) Eva Marie Voracek (Italy) Alessandra Mazzola	(Netherlands) Jasmijn Gimbrère (Greece) Sapfo Sakellaridi (Czech Republic) Aneta Laboutková (Netherlands) Britt du Pree
May 18	Bol, Croatia; Clay; W35; Singles and doubles draws	(Poland) Weronika Falkowska; 6–3, 6–2	(Croatia) Iva Primorac Pavičić	(Germany) Eva Bennemann (Sweden) Lea Nilsson	(Croatia) Lea Bošković (Spain) María Martínez Vaquero (Serbia) Natalija Senić (Croatia) Tena Lukas
May 18	Bol, Croatia; Clay; W35; Singles and doubles draws	(France) Yara Bartashevich (Poland) Weronika Falkowska; 6–4, 6–2	(Italy) Aurora Zantedeschi (Italy) Arianna Zucchini	(Germany) Eva Bennemann (Sweden) Lea Nilsson	(Croatia) Lea Bošković (Spain) María Martínez Vaquero (Serbia) Natalija Senić (Croatia) Tena Lukas
May 18	Toyama, Japan; Hard; W15; Singles and doubles draws	(Japan) Hiromi Abe; 5–7, 7–6^{(7–2)}, 6–3	(Japan) Sae Noguchi	(Japan) Sara Yoshida (Japan) Rinko Matsuda	(Japan) Moeka Miyata (Singapore) Eva Marie Desvignes (Japan) Himari Sato (Japan) Yui Chikaraishi
May 18	Toyama, Japan; Hard; W15; Singles and doubles draws	(Japan) Ayumi Miyamoto (Japan) Himari Sato; 6–4, 6–2	(South Korea) Moon Jeong (Hong Kong) Shek Cheuk-ying	(Japan) Sara Yoshida (Japan) Rinko Matsuda	(Japan) Moeka Miyata (Singapore) Eva Marie Desvignes (Japan) Himari Sato (Japan) Yui Chikaraishi
May 18	Tsaghkadzor, Armenia; Clay; W15; Singles and doubles draws	Kristina Kroitor; 6–1, 6–2	(Greece) Valentini Grammatikopoulou	(Uzbekistan) Sevil Yuldasheva (Armenia) Ani Amiraghyan	(Armenia) Armine Yesaian; Ekaterina Agureeva (Bosnia and Herzegovina) Tea Kovačević; Vasilisa Taranova
May 18	Tsaghkadzor, Armenia; Clay; W15; Singles and doubles draws	Darya Kharlanova; Polina Starkova; 6–4, 3–6, [10–4]	Ekaterina Agureeva; Anna Sedysheva	(Uzbekistan) Sevil Yuldasheva (Armenia) Ani Amiraghyan	(Armenia) Armine Yesaian; Ekaterina Agureeva (Bosnia and Herzegovina) Tea Kovačević; Vasilisa Taranova
May 18	Kayseri, Turkiye; Hard; W15; Singles and doubles draws	(Australia) Alana Subasic; 6–4, 3–6, 6–1	(Turkey) İrem Kurt	(France) Marie Villet (Netherlands) Demi Tran	(Turkey) İlay Yörük (Kazakhstan) Asylzhan Arystanbekova (Kazakhstan) Eva Korysheva; Ksenia Smirnova
May 18	Kayseri, Turkiye; Hard; W15; Singles and doubles draws	(Kazakhstan) Asylzhan Arystanbekova (Kazakhstan) Ingkar Dyussebay; 6–2, 6–1	(Turkey) Selina Atay (Turkey) İrem Kurt	(France) Marie Villet (Netherlands) Demi Tran	(Turkey) İlay Yörük (Kazakhstan) Asylzhan Arystanbekova (Kazakhstan) Eva Korysheva; Ksenia Smirnova
May 18	Grado, Italy; Clay; W15; Singles and doubles draws	(Italy) Sofia Rocchetti; 3–6, 6–3, 6–3	(Italy) Federica Trevisan	(Italy) Camilla Gennaro (Italy) Francesca Gandolfi	(Ukraine) Daria Yesypchuk (Czech Republic) Denisa Žoldáková (Slovenia) Masa Viriant (Italy) Eleonora Alvisi
May 18	Grado, Italy; Clay; W15; Singles and doubles draws	(Spain) Celia Cerviño Ruiz (France) Cindy Langlais; 6–1, 3–6, [13–11]	(Greece) Marianne Argyrokastriti (Ukraine) Daria Yesypchuk	(Italy) Camilla Gennaro (Italy) Francesca Gandolfi	(Ukraine) Daria Yesypchuk (Czech Republic) Denisa Žoldáková (Slovenia) Masa Viriant (Italy) Eleonora Alvisi
May 18	Kuršumlijska Banja, Serbia; Clay; W15; Singles and doubles draws	(Switzerland) Marie Mettraux; 7–6^{(7–5)}, 6–2	(Serbia) Luna Vujović	(Romania) Ștefania Bojica (Netherlands) Madelief Hageman	(Romania) Patricia Georgiana Goina (Serbia) Elena Milutinović (Bulgaria) Julia Stamatova (Serbia) Anja Stanković
May 18	Kuršumlijska Banja, Serbia; Clay; W15; Singles and doubles draws	(Czech Republic) Michaela Bayerlová (Czech Republic) Laetitia Pulchartová; 7–6^{(7–0)}, 7–6^{(7–4)}	(France) Nina Radovanović (Serbia) Anja Stanković	(Romania) Ștefania Bojica (Netherlands) Madelief Hageman	(Romania) Patricia Georgiana Goina (Serbia) Elena Milutinović (Bulgaria) Julia Stamatova (Serbia) Anja Stanković
May 18	Gaborone, Botswana; Hard; W15; Singles and doubles draws	(South Africa) Marilouise van Zyl; 7–6^{(7–5)}, 6–1	(Denmark) Elena Jamshidi	(Serbia) Darja Suvirdjonkova (Poland) Dominika Podhajecka	(Israel) Mika Buchnik (Mexico) Sabastiani León (South Africa) Danielle Dai Chapman (India) Tanisha Kashyap
May 18	Gaborone, Botswana; Hard; W15; Singles and doubles draws	(Mexico) Sabastiani León (Poland) Dominika Podhajecka; Walkover	(India) Tanisha Kashyap (Luxembourg) Onalee Wagner	(Serbia) Darja Suvirdjonkova (Poland) Dominika Podhajecka	(Israel) Mika Buchnik (Mexico) Sabastiani León (South Africa) Danielle Dai Chapman (India) Tanisha Kashyap
May 18	Hurghada, Egypt; Hard; W15; Singles and doubles draws	(Egypt) Aya El Sayed; 3–6, 6–2, 7–6^{(7–1)}	Ulyana Hrabavets	(Cyprus) Olga Danilova; Vlada Mincheva	(Egypt) Sandra Samir (Egypt) Nada Fouad (Georgia (country)) Zoziya Kardava (Italy) Sara Milanese
May 18	Hurghada, Egypt; Hard; W15; Singles and doubles draws	(Egypt) Aya El Sayed (Egypt) Nada Fouad; 6–7^{(1–7)}, 6–4, [10–2]	Ulyana Hrabavets (Georgia (country)) Zoziya Kardava	(Cyprus) Olga Danilova; Vlada Mincheva	(Egypt) Sandra Samir (Egypt) Nada Fouad (Georgia (country)) Zoziya Kardava (Italy) Sara Milanese
May 18	Monastir, Tunisia; Hard; W15; Singles and doubles draws	(France) Laïa Petretic; 6–4, 6–7^{(6–8)}, 7–5	Anna Kubareva	(Mexico) Lya Fernández (Ukraine) Mariia Lazarenko	(Croatia) Karla Popović (Italy) Anastasia Bertacchi (Italy) Aurora Urso (Germany) Karla Bartel
May 18	Monastir, Tunisia; Hard; W15; Singles and doubles draws	(Italy) Anastasia Bertacchi (Italy) Carlotta Moccia; 6–2, 6–1	(Argentina) Luciana Moyano (France) Laïa Petretic	(Mexico) Lya Fernández (Ukraine) Mariia Lazarenko	(Croatia) Karla Popović (Italy) Anastasia Bertacchi (Italy) Aurora Urso (Germany) Karla Bartel
May 25	Zaragoza Open; Zaragoza, Spain; Clay; W75; Singles – Doubles	(Italy) Jennifer Ruggeri; 3–6, 6–3, 7–6^{(7–3)}	(United States) Kayla Day	(Spain) Guiomar Maristany (Argentina) Luisina Giovannini	(Spain) Andrea Lázaro García (United States) Elizabeth Mandlik (Spain) Ángela Fita Boluda (Argentina) Nadia Podoroska
May 25	Zaragoza Open; Zaragoza, Spain; Clay; W75; Singles – Doubles	(Spain) Yvonne Cavallé Reimers (Spain) Ángela Fita Boluda; 6–4, 6–4	(United States) Ayana Akli (Belgium) Lara Salden	(Spain) Guiomar Maristany (Argentina) Luisina Giovannini	(Spain) Andrea Lázaro García (United States) Elizabeth Mandlik (Spain) Ángela Fita Boluda (Argentina) Nadia Podoroska
May 25	Serbian Tennis Tour; Kuršumlijska Banja, Serbia; Clay; W75; Singles and doubles draws	(Czech Republic) Laura Samson; 6–3, 3–6, 7–5	(Serbia) Lola Radivojević	(Greece) Martha Matoula (Sweden) Lisa Zaar	(Serbia) Elena Milovanović (Greece) Despina Papamichail (Romania) Elena Ruxandra Bertea (Serbia) Teodora Kostović
May 25	Serbian Tennis Tour; Kuršumlijska Banja, Serbia; Clay; W75; Singles and doubles draws	(Czech Republic) Michaela Bayerlová (Serbia) Elena Milovanović; 6–3, 6–4	(Kazakhstan) Zhibek Kulambayeva (Sweden) Lisa Zaar	(Greece) Martha Matoula (Sweden) Lisa Zaar	(Serbia) Elena Milovanović (Greece) Despina Papamichail (Romania) Elena Ruxandra Bertea (Serbia) Teodora Kostović
May 25	Wuning, China; Hard; W35; Singles and doubles draws	Alexandra Shubladze; 6–4, 6–1	(United States) Hina Inoue	(China) Shi Han (China) Wang Jiaqi	(China) Li Zongyu; Maria Golovina (China) Yang Yidi (China) Bai Zhuoxuan
May 25	Wuning, China; Hard; W35; Singles and doubles draws	(New Zealand) Monique Barry (Japan) Hikaru Sato; 7–6^{(7–3)}, 6–4	(China) Wang Meiling (China) Ye Qiuyu	(China) Shi Han (China) Wang Jiaqi	(China) Li Zongyu; Maria Golovina (China) Yang Yidi (China) Bai Zhuoxuan
May 25	Bol, Croatia; Clay; W35; Singles and doubles draws	(Italy) Aurora Zantedeschi; 6–3, 6–2	(New Zealand) Valentina Ivanov	(Greece) Elena Korokozidi (Bosnia and Herzegovina) Sara Mikača	(Brazil) Gabriela Cé (Germany) Gina Marie Dittmann (China) Sun Xinran (Germany) Jule Niemeier
May 25	Bol, Croatia; Clay; W35; Singles and doubles draws	(Croatia) Ria Derniković (Croatia) Dora Mišković; 6–2, 6–3	(India) Vaishnavi Adkar (United States) Mia Horvit	(Greece) Elena Korokozidi (Bosnia and Herzegovina) Sara Mikača	(Brazil) Gabriela Cé (Germany) Gina Marie Dittmann (China) Sun Xinran (Germany) Jule Niemeier
May 25	Wichita, United States; Hard; W35; Singles and doubles draws	(United States) Reese Brantmeier; 6–4, 6–0	(India) Sahaja Yamalapalli	(Kazakhstan) Yekaterina Dmitrichenko (Peru) Dana Guzmán	(China) Wang Xintong; Ekaterina Khayrutdinova (United States) Lea Ma (United States) Clervie Ngounoue
May 25	Wichita, United States; Hard; W35; Singles and doubles draws	(United States) Reese Brantmeier; Maria Sholokhova; 6–3, 6–1	(United States) Maya Iyengar; Ekaterina Khayrutdinova	(Kazakhstan) Yekaterina Dmitrichenko (Peru) Dana Guzmán	(China) Wang Xintong; Ekaterina Khayrutdinova (United States) Lea Ma (United States) Clervie Ngounoue
May 25	Fukui, Japan; Hard; W15; Singles and doubles draws	(Japan) Hiromi Abe; 6–3, 7–5	(Japan) Natsuki Yoshimoto	(Japan) Rinko Matsuda (Japan) Sae Noguchi	(Hong Kong) Shek Cheuk-ying (South Korea) Kim Eun-chae (Japan) Ayumi Miyamoto (Japan) Sae Noguchi
May 25	Fukui, Japan; Hard; W15; Singles and doubles draws	(South Korea) Im Hee-rae (South Korea) Kim Eun-chae; 6–4, 6–4	(Japan) Natsuho Arakawa (Japan) Nanari Katsumi	(Japan) Rinko Matsuda (Japan) Sae Noguchi	(Hong Kong) Shek Cheuk-ying (South Korea) Kim Eun-chae (Japan) Ayumi Miyamoto (Japan) Sae Noguchi
May 25	Tsaghkadzor, Armenia; Clay; W15; Singles and doubles draws	Kristina Kroitor; 6–0 ret.	Anna Bazderova	(Kazakhstan) Aruzhan Sagandykova (Serbia) Mirjana Jovanović	(Uzbekistan) Sevil Yuldasheva; Anna Sedysheva; Vasilisa Taranova; Daria Kuznetsova
May 25	Tsaghkadzor, Armenia; Clay; W15; Singles and doubles draws	(Kazakhstan) Aruzhan Sagandykova (Uzbekistan) Sevil Yuldasheva; 7–5, 6–2	(Italy) Ginevra Parentini Vallega Montebruno (Iran) Meshkatolzahra Safi	(Kazakhstan) Aruzhan Sagandykova (Serbia) Mirjana Jovanović	(Uzbekistan) Sevil Yuldasheva; Anna Sedysheva; Vasilisa Taranova; Daria Kuznetsova
May 25	Oliva, Spain; Clay; W15; Singles and doubles draws	(France) Jenny Lim; 6–4, 6–3	(Germany) Franziska Sziedat	(Spain) Sara Dols (France) Cindy Langlais	(Belgium) Margaux Maquet (Germany) Victoria Pohle (Spain) Raquel Caballero Chica (Italy) Laura Mair
May 25	Oliva, Spain; Clay; W15; Singles and doubles draws	(Norway) Astrid Brune Olsen (New Zealand) Elyse Tse; 6–3, 6–2	(Spain) Luna Dinoto Fernandez (Spain) Gabriela Paun	(Spain) Sara Dols (France) Cindy Langlais	(Belgium) Margaux Maquet (Germany) Victoria Pohle (Spain) Raquel Caballero Chica (Italy) Laura Mair
May 25	Szentendre, Hungary; Clay; W15; Singles and doubles draws	(Germany) Marie Vogt; 6–4, 7–5	(Slovakia) Radka Zelníčková	(Slovakia) Irina Balus (Slovenia) Pia Lovrič	(Romania) Giulia Safina Popa (United Kingdom) Allegra Korpanec Davies (Greece) Marianne Argyrokastriti (United States) Julia Adams
May 25	Szentendre, Hungary; Clay; W15; Singles and doubles draws	(Argentina) Ana Victoria Gobbi Monllau (Colombia) Mariana Isabel Higuita Barraza; 0–6, 6–4, [10–7]	(Germany) Valentina Steiner (Germany) Sonja Zhenikhova	(Slovakia) Irina Balus (Slovenia) Pia Lovrič	(Romania) Giulia Safina Popa (United Kingdom) Allegra Korpanec Davies (Greece) Marianne Argyrokastriti (United States) Julia Adams
May 25	Kayseri, Turkiye; Hard; W15; Singles and doubles draws	(Turkey) Deniz Dilek; 6–3, 6–3	(Turkey) Duru Söke	(Norway) Emily Sartz-Lunde (Turkey) İrem Kurt	(Turkey) Selina Atay (Turkey) Ada Kumru; Ksenia Smirnova (Kazakhstan) Azylzhan Arystanbekova
May 25	Kayseri, Turkiye; Hard; W15; Singles and doubles draws	(Kazakhstan) Asylzhan Arystanbekova (Kazakhstan) Ingkar Dyussebay; 6–7^{(5–7)}, 6–2, [10–1]	(Ukraine) Mariia Bergen (Romania) Alexia Lavinia Puiac	(Norway) Emily Sartz-Lunde (Turkey) İrem Kurt	(Turkey) Selina Atay (Turkey) Ada Kumru; Ksenia Smirnova (Kazakhstan) Azylzhan Arystanbekova
May 25	Monastir, Tunisia; Hard; W15; Singles and doubles draws	(Lithuania) Andrė Lukošiūtė; 7–6^{(7–3)}, 1–6, 6–2	(Italy) Anastasia Bertacchi	(Spain) María Oliver Sánchez (Ukraine) Mariia Lazarenko	(Mexico) Natalia Sousa Salazar (Croatia) Karla Popović (France) Lena Thomas Iglesias (Argentina) Luciana Moyano
May 25	Monastir, Tunisia; Hard; W15; Singles and doubles draws	(Italy) Lavinia Luciano (Italy) Matilde Mariani; Walkover	(Mexico) Lya Fernández (Argentina) Luciana Moyano	(Spain) María Oliver Sánchez (Ukraine) Mariia Lazarenko	(Mexico) Natalia Sousa Salazar (Croatia) Karla Popović (France) Lena Thomas Iglesias (Argentina) Luciana Moyano
May 25	Lakewood, United States; Hard; W15; Singles and doubles draws	(United States) Tatum Evans; 5–7, 6–3, 6–2	(United States) Anne Christine Lutkemeyer Obregon	(Japan) Mayu Crossley (United States) Allison Wang	(Hong Kong) Kallista Liu (United States) Olivia Center (United States) Kailey Evans (Canada) Dasha Plekhanova
May 25	Lakewood, United States; Hard; W15; Singles and doubles draws	(Spain) Eva Álvarez Sande (United States) Maxine Murphy; 6–2, 3–6, [10–6]	(United States) Jaedan Brown (United States) Kailey Evans	(Japan) Mayu Crossley (United States) Allison Wang	(Hong Kong) Kallista Liu (United States) Olivia Center (United States) Kailey Evans (Canada) Dasha Plekhanova

=== June ===
Week of	Tournament	Winner	Runners-up	Semifinalists	Quarterfinalists
June 1	Palmetto Pro Open; Sumter, United States; Hard; W100; Singles – Doubles	Kristina Liutova; 6–4, 6–3	(United States) Reese Brantmeier	(United States) Whitney Osuigwe (Canada) Cadence Brace	(Ecuador) Mell Reasco (United States) Eryn Cayetano (United States) Kylie Collins (United States) Malaika Rapolu
June 1	Palmetto Pro Open; Sumter, United States; Hard; W100; Singles – Doubles	(United States) Catherine Harrison (Australia) Alexandra Osborne; 6–4, 4–6, [10–7]	(United States) Anna Rogers (United States) Allura Zamarripa	(United States) Whitney Osuigwe (Canada) Cadence Brace	(Ecuador) Mell Reasco (United States) Eryn Cayetano (United States) Kylie Collins (United States) Malaika Rapolu
June 1	Internazionali Femminili di Tennis Città di Caserta; Caserta, Italy; Clay; W75; Singles – Doubles	(Italy) Federica Urgesi; 6–4, 3–6, 6–1	(Italy) Alessandra Mazzola	(Italy) Deborah Chiesa (Germany) Nastasja Schunk	(Italy) Marta Lombardini (Brazil) Laura Pigossi (Italy) Diletta Cherubini (Italy) Dalila Spiteri
June 1	Internazionali Femminili di Tennis Città di Caserta; Caserta, Italy; Clay; W75; Singles – Doubles	(United Kingdom) Freya Christie (United Kingdom) Eden Silva; 3–6, 6–4, [10–4]	(Spain) Yvonne Cavallé Reimers (Brazil) Laura Pigossi	(Italy) Deborah Chiesa (Germany) Nastasja Schunk	(Italy) Marta Lombardini (Brazil) Laura Pigossi (Italy) Diletta Cherubini (Italy) Dalila Spiteri
June 1	Wuning, China; Hard; W50; Singles and doubles draws	(China) Yao Xinxin; 6–4, 6–4	(China) Ren Yufei	(Japan) Reina Goto (Japan) Rina Saigo	(China) Wang Jiayi (China) Huang Yujia (China) Yang Yidi (Kazakhstan) Sonja Zhiyenbayeva
June 1	Wuning, China; Hard; W50; Singles and doubles draws	(Chinese Taipei) Li Yu-yun (China) Zhang Ying; 4–6, 6–0, [10–2]	(China) Huang Yujia (China) Zheng Wushuang	(Japan) Reina Goto (Japan) Rina Saigo	(China) Wang Jiayi (China) Huang Yujia (China) Yang Yidi (Kazakhstan) Sonja Zhiyenbayeva
June 1	Montemor-o-Novo, Portugal; Hard; W50; Singles and doubles draws	(South Korea) Ku Yeon-woo; 3–6, 6–4, 6–2	(Portugal) Francisca Jorge	(Portugal) Matilde Jorge (Finland) Anastasia Kulikova	(Slovakia) Katarína Kužmová (Slovakia) Viktória Morvayová (United Kingdom) Indianna Spink (Spain) María Martínez Vaquero
June 1	Montemor-o-Novo, Portugal; Hard; W50; Singles and doubles draws	(Slovakia) Katarína Kužmová (Australia) Elena Micic; 6–2, 4–6, [10–7]	(United Kingdom) Esther Adeshina (United Kingdom) Lauryn John-Baptiste	(Portugal) Matilde Jorge (Finland) Anastasia Kulikova	(Slovakia) Katarína Kužmová (Slovakia) Viktória Morvayová (United Kingdom) Indianna Spink (Spain) María Martínez Vaquero
June 1	Ontinyent, Spain; Clay; W15; Singles and doubles draws	(Spain) Carmen Gallardo Guevara; 2–6, 6–2, 6–3	(Spain) Neus Torner Sensano	(Estonia) Maileen Nuudi (Spain) María García Cid	(Spain) Raquel González Vilar (United States) Shannon Lam (Chile) Jimar Gerald González (Greece) Marianne Argyrokastriti
June 1	Ontinyent, Spain; Clay; W15; Singles and doubles draws	(Chile) Jimar Gerald González (Chile) Camila Rodero; 6–3, 5–7, [11–9]	(Spain) Elena Molla Pons (Spain) Lucia Ros Parres	(Estonia) Maileen Nuudi (Spain) María García Cid	(Spain) Raquel González Vilar (United States) Shannon Lam (Chile) Jimar Gerald González (Greece) Marianne Argyrokastriti
June 1	Focșani, Romania; Clay; W15; Singles and doubles draws	(Ukraine) Daria Yesypchuk; 6–3, 7–6^{(7–5)}	(Germany) Sophie Greiner	(Romania) Cristiana Nicoleta Todoni (Romania) Maria Sara Popa	(Romania) Sara Victoria Bălan (Romania) Ana Ioana Varsa (Romania) Simona Ogescu (Romania) Diana-Ioana Simionescu
June 1	Focșani, Romania; Clay; W15; Singles and doubles draws	(Germany) Laura Böhner (Ukraine) Daria Yesypchuk; 6–2, 6–3	(Moldova) Lia Belibova (Romania) Ana Ioana Varsa	(Romania) Cristiana Nicoleta Todoni (Romania) Maria Sara Popa	(Romania) Sara Victoria Bălan (Romania) Ana Ioana Varsa (Romania) Simona Ogescu (Romania) Diana-Ioana Simionescu
June 1	Osijek, Croatia; Clay; W15; Singles and doubles draws	(Switzerland) Katerina Tsygourova; 7–5, 6–3	(Slovenia) Živa Falkner	(Croatia) Dora Mišković (Slovakia) Kali Šupová	(Slovakia) Eszter Méri (Czech Republic) Klára Kajabová (Slovakia) Salma Drugdová (Romania) Bianca Bărbulescu
June 1	Osijek, Croatia; Clay; W15; Singles and doubles draws	(Hungary) Melinda Bíró (Croatia) Dora Mišković; 6–1, 3–6, [10–3]	(Romania) Bianca Bărbulescu (Switzerland) Katerina Tsygourova	(Croatia) Dora Mišković (Slovakia) Kali Šupová	(Slovakia) Eszter Méri (Czech Republic) Klára Kajabová (Slovakia) Salma Drugdová (Romania) Bianca Bărbulescu
June 1	Kuršumlijska Banja, Serbia; Clay; W15; Singles and doubles draws	Anastasia Zolotareva; 6–4, 6–2	(Bulgaria) Lidia Encheva	(Czech Republic) Michaela Bayerlová (Serbia) Natalija Senić	(Spain) Eugenia Zozaya Menéndez (Serbia) Elena Milovanović (Bulgaria) Julia Stamatova (Netherlands) Madelief Hageman
June 1	Kuršumlijska Banja, Serbia; Clay; W15; Singles and doubles draws	(Serbia) Elena Milovanović (Serbia) Natalija Senić; 6–2, 6–4	(Romania) Alexandra Irina Anghel; Mariia Masiianskaia	(Czech Republic) Michaela Bayerlová (Serbia) Natalija Senić	(Spain) Eugenia Zozaya Menéndez (Serbia) Elena Milovanović (Bulgaria) Julia Stamatova (Netherlands) Madelief Hageman
June 1	Banja Luka, Bosnia and Herzegovina; Clay; W15; Singles and doubles draws	(Czech Republic) Lucie Petruzelová; 6–0, 6–1	(United Kingdom) Allegra Korpanec Davies	(Serbia) Mirjana Jovanović (Finland) Ella Haavisto	(Slovakia) Adela Polakovičová (Serbia) Andrea Obradović (Montenegro) Tea Nikčević (Bosnia and Herzegovina) Sara Mikača
June 1	Banja Luka, Bosnia and Herzegovina; Clay; W15; Singles and doubles draws	(Finland) Ella Haavisto (Finland) Stella Remander; 6–2, 6–1	(Switzerland) Iva Ivanović (Slovenia) Karolina Trnkovski	(Serbia) Mirjana Jovanović (Finland) Ella Haavisto	(Slovakia) Adela Polakovičová (Serbia) Andrea Obradović (Montenegro) Tea Nikčević (Bosnia and Herzegovina) Sara Mikača
June 1	Kayseri, Turkiye; Hard; W15; Singles and doubles draws	(Turkey) Deniz Dilek; 6–2, 6–3	(Germany) Ann Akasha Ceuca	(Australia) Alana Subasic (France) Marie Villet	(Kazakhstan) Asylzhan Arystanbekova (Turkey) İrem Kurt (Italy) Clarissa Gai; Ksenia Smirnova
June 1	Kayseri, Turkiye; Hard; W15; Singles and doubles draws	(Kazakhstan) Asylzhan Arystanbekova (Kazakhstan) Ingkar Dyussebay; 6–2, 2–6, [10–5]	(Turkey) Duru Söke (Turkey) Doğa Türkmen	(Australia) Alana Subasic (France) Marie Villet	(Kazakhstan) Asylzhan Arystanbekova (Turkey) İrem Kurt (Italy) Clarissa Gai; Ksenia Smirnova
June 1	Monastir, Tunisia; Hard; W15; Singles and doubles draws	(Spain) Berta Passola; 6–1, 6–1	(Lithuania) Andrė Lukošiūtė	(France) Chloé Noël (Spain) María Oliver Sánchez	(Germany) Karla Bartel; Maria Andrienko; Vlada Mincheva (Italy) Anastasia Bertacchi
June 1	Monastir, Tunisia; Hard; W15; Singles and doubles draws	(Argentina) Lourdes Ayala (Spain) Berta Passola; Walkover	Maria Andrienko (Germany) Karla Bartel	(France) Chloé Noël (Spain) María Oliver Sánchez	(Germany) Karla Bartel; Maria Andrienko; Vlada Mincheva (Italy) Anastasia Bertacchi
June 1	Casablanca, Morocco; Clay; W15; Singles and doubles draws	(Slovakia) Nina Vargová; 6–0, 6–1	(Spain) Marta Soriano Santiago	(Italy) Carolina Dibenedetto; Elina Nepliy	(Spain) Lorena Solar Donoso (France) Emma Léné (France) Sarah Iliev (Italy) Noemi Maines
June 1	Casablanca, Morocco; Clay; W15; Singles and doubles draws	(France) Sarah Iliev (France) Emma Léné; 6–4, 6–2	(Morocco) Aya El Aouni (Morocco) Diae El Jardi	(Italy) Carolina Dibenedetto; Elina Nepliy	(Spain) Lorena Solar Donoso (France) Emma Léné (France) Sarah Iliev (Italy) Noemi Maines
June 1	Lakewood, United States; Hard; W15; Singles and doubles draws	(Japan) Mayu Crossley; 6–4, 6–3	(United States) Kristina Penickova	(United States) Tatum Evans (Canada) Dasha Plekhanova	(United States) Kailey Evans (United States) Rachel Gailis (United States) Ava Hrastar (United States) Jo-Yee Chan
June 1	Lakewood, United States; Hard; W15; Singles and doubles draws	(United States) Ava Hrastar (United States) Victoria Mulville; 6–3, 2–6, [11–9]	(United States) Kailey Evans (Australia) Lily Taylor	(United States) Tatum Evans (Canada) Dasha Plekhanova	(United States) Kailey Evans (United States) Rachel Gailis (United States) Ava Hrastar (United States) Jo-Yee Chan
June 1	Brasília, Brazil; Hard; W15; Singles and doubles draws	(Brazil) Luiza Fullana; 6–1, 1–6, 6–2	(Brazil) Marjorie Souza	(Bolivia) Noelia Zeballos (Ecuador) Camila Romero	(Brazil) Maria Eduarda Carbone dos Santos (Argentina) Francesca Mattioli (Brazil) Ana Candiotto (Colombia) María Torres Murcia
June 1	Brasília, Brazil; Hard; W15; Singles and doubles draws	(Ecuador) Camila Romero (Bolivia) Noelia Zeballos; 6–4, 6–1	(Colombia) María Herazo González (Argentina) Francesca Mattioli	(Bolivia) Noelia Zeballos (Ecuador) Camila Romero	(Brazil) Maria Eduarda Carbone dos Santos (Argentina) Francesca Mattioli (Brazil) Ana Candiotto (Colombia) María Torres Murcia
June 8	Wuning, China; Hard; W100; Singles and doubles draws	(China) Li Zongyu; 6–4, 6–2	(China) Huang Yujia	(Japan) Sara Saito (Japan) Mai Hontama	(Kazakhstan) Sonja Zhiyenbayeva; Varvara Panshina (Japan) Mei Yamaguchi (Thailand) Anchisa Chanta
June 8	Wuning, China; Hard; W100; Singles and doubles draws	(Chinese Taipei) Li Yu-yun (China) Zhang Ying; 6–3, 6–2	(Japan) Hiromi Abe (Thailand) Peangtarn Plipuech	(Japan) Sara Saito (Japan) Mai Hontama	(Kazakhstan) Sonja Zhiyenbayeva; Varvara Panshina (Japan) Mei Yamaguchi (Thailand) Anchisa Chanta
June 8	Zagreb Ladies Open; Zagreb, Croatia; Clay; W100; Singles – Doubles	(Armenia) Elina Avanesyan; 6–1, 6–3	(Sweden) Kajsa Rinaldo Persson	(Croatia) Iva Primorac Pavičić (Germany) Anna-Lena Friedsam	(Slovenia) Dalila Jakupović (Serbia) Mia Ristić (Italy) Laura Mair (Germany) Gina Marie Dittmann
June 8	Zagreb Ladies Open; Zagreb, Croatia; Clay; W100; Singles – Doubles	(Croatia) Lucija Ćirić Bagarić (Italy) Angelica Moratelli; 7–5, 6–3	(Bulgaria) Rositsa Dencheva; Ekaterina Kazionova	(Croatia) Iva Primorac Pavičić (Germany) Anna-Lena Friedsam	(Slovenia) Dalila Jakupović (Serbia) Mia Ristić (Italy) Laura Mair (Germany) Gina Marie Dittmann
June 8	Macha Lake Open; Česká Lípa, Czechia; Clay; W75; Singles and doubles draws	Julia Avdeeva; 1–6, 6–3, 6–2	(Netherlands) Eva Vedder	(Sweden) Caijsa Hennemann (Romania) Elena Ruxandra Bertea	(Czech Republic) Lucie Havlíčková (Czech Republic) Denisa Žoldáková (Malta) Francesca Curmi (Greece) Martha Matoula
June 8	Macha Lake Open; Česká Lípa, Czechia; Clay; W75; Singles and doubles draws	(Czech Republic) Alena Kovačková (Czech Republic) Jana Kovačková; 6–4, 6–1	(United States) Hibah Shaikh (United States) Allura Zamarripa	(Sweden) Caijsa Hennemann (Romania) Elena Ruxandra Bertea	(Czech Republic) Lucie Havlíčková (Czech Republic) Denisa Žoldáková (Malta) Francesca Curmi (Greece) Martha Matoula
June 8	Guimarães Ladies Open; Guimarães, Portugal; Hard; W50; Singles and doubles draws	(United States) Savannah Broadus; 1–6, 6–3, 6–4	Aliona Falei	(France) Manon Léonard (Slovakia) Katarína Kužmová	(Portugal) Francisca Jorge (Canada) Katherine Sebov (Canada) Ariana Arseneault (Portugal) Matilde Jorge
June 8	Guimarães Ladies Open; Guimarães, Portugal; Hard; W50; Singles and doubles draws	(United States) Savannah Broadus (United States) Abigail Rencheli; 6–3, 6–4	(Slovakia) Viktória Hrunčáková (Slovakia) Katarína Kužmová	(France) Manon Léonard (Slovakia) Katarína Kužmová	(Portugal) Francisca Jorge (Canada) Katherine Sebov (Canada) Ariana Arseneault (Portugal) Matilde Jorge
June 8	Hurghada, Egypt; Grass; W50; Singles and doubles draws	Polina Iatcenko; 6–4, 6–3	(Poland) Martyna Kubka	Anastasia Tikhonova (Czech Republic) Gabriela Knutson	(Italy) Sara Milanese (Egypt) Sandra Samir (Slovakia) Viktória Morvayová (Switzerland) Valentina Ryser
June 8	Hurghada, Egypt; Grass; W50; Singles and doubles draws	Polina Iatcenko (Poland) Martyna Kubka; 6–2, 6–2	(Cyprus) Olga Danilova (Croatia) Karla Popović	Anastasia Tikhonova (Czech Republic) Gabriela Knutson	(Italy) Sara Milanese (Egypt) Sandra Samir (Slovakia) Viktória Morvayová (Switzerland) Valentina Ryser
June 8	Nice, France; Clay; W35+H; Singles and doubles draws	(France) Clara Burel; 6–1, 3–6, 6–3	(France) Jenny Lim	(Romania) Maria Sara Popa (Switzerland) Alina Granwehr	Alevtina Ibragimova (Bulgaria) Iva Ivanova (Italy) Tatiana Pieri (Romania) Oana Georgeta Simion
June 8	Nice, France; Clay; W35+H; Singles and doubles draws	(Switzerland) Alina Granwehr (Germany) Julia Stusek; 5–7, 7–6^{(12–10)}, [10–4]	Arina Bulatova; Alevtina Ibragimova	(Romania) Maria Sara Popa (Switzerland) Alina Granwehr	Alevtina Ibragimova (Bulgaria) Iva Ivanova (Italy) Tatiana Pieri (Romania) Oana Georgeta Simion
June 8	San Gregorio, Italy; Clay; W35; Singles and doubles draws	(Argentina) Nadia Podoroska; 2–6, 6–4, 7–6^{(7–5)}	(Peru) Lucciana Pérez Alarcón	(Italy) Aurora Zantedeschi (Romania) Andreea Prisăcariu	(Serbia) Dunja Marić (Italy) Alessandra Mazzola (Italy) Camilla Gennaro (Greece) Elena Korokozidi
June 8	San Gregorio, Italy; Clay; W35; Singles and doubles draws	(Italy) Anastasia Abbagnato (Argentina) Paula Ormaechea; 6–3, 6–7^{(3–7)}, [10–7]	(Belgium) Ema Kovacevic (Italy) Carolina Troiano	(Italy) Aurora Zantedeschi (Romania) Andreea Prisăcariu	(Serbia) Dunja Marić (Italy) Alessandra Mazzola (Italy) Camilla Gennaro (Greece) Elena Korokozidi
June 8	Morocco Tennis Tour; Casablanca, Morocco; Clay; W35; Singles and doubles draws	(Serbia) Luna Vujović; 6–4, 6–4	(Spain) Aran Teixidó García	(France) Emma Léné (Slovakia) Nina Vargová	(Austria) Ekaterina Perelygina (Spain) María García Cid (Italy) Martina Colmegna (Spain) Carlota Martínez Círez
June 8	Morocco Tennis Tour; Casablanca, Morocco; Clay; W35; Singles and doubles draws	(United States) Madison Sieg (Slovakia) Nina Vargová; 7–6^{(7–1)}, 6–1	Elina Nepliy (India) Vasanti Shinde	(France) Emma Léné (Slovakia) Nina Vargová	(Austria) Ekaterina Perelygina (Spain) María García Cid (Italy) Martina Colmegna (Spain) Carlota Martínez Círez
June 8	Decatur, United States; Hard; W35; Singles and doubles draws	(United States) Lea Ma; 6–3, 7–6^{(7–3)}	(United States) Madison Brengle	(India) Sahaja Yamalapalli (Poland) Zuzanna Pawlikowska	(United States) Malaika Rapolu; Ekaterina Khayrutdinova (Canada) Ana Grubor (United States) Piper Charney
June 8	Decatur, United States; Hard; W35; Singles and doubles draws	(United States) Sara Daavettila; Maria Kononova; 6–3, 6–2	(United States) Thara Gowda (United States) Kaede Usui	(India) Sahaja Yamalapalli (Poland) Zuzanna Pawlikowska	(United States) Malaika Rapolu; Ekaterina Khayrutdinova (Canada) Ana Grubor (United States) Piper Charney
June 8	Cuiabá, Brazil; Clay; W35; Singles and doubles draws	(Brazil) Carolina Alves; 7–6^{(7–2)}, 4–6, 6–4	(Chile) Antonia Vergara Rivera	(Argentina) Martina Capurro Taborda (Bolivia) Noelia Zeballos	(United States) Gabriella Price (Argentina) María Florencia Urrutia (Ecuador) Mell Reasco (Brazil) Luiza Fullana
June 8	Cuiabá, Brazil; Clay; W35; Singles and doubles draws	(Ecuador) Mell Reasco (Bolivia) Noelia Zeballos; 7–6^{(7–1)}, 6–3	(Argentina) Justina María González Daniele (Ecuador) Camila Romero	(Argentina) Martina Capurro Taborda (Bolivia) Noelia Zeballos	(United States) Gabriella Price (Argentina) María Florencia Urrutia (Ecuador) Mell Reasco (Brazil) Luiza Fullana
June 8	Tokyo, Japan; Hard; W15; Singles and doubles draws	(Japan) Ikumi Yamazaki; 7–6^{(7–4)}, 2–6, 6–2	(Japan) Hikaru Sato	(Japan) Mayuka Aikawa (Japan) Kayo Nishimura	(Japan) Eri Shimizu (Japan) Natsuki Yoshimoto (Japan) Yuno Kitahara (Japan) Mao Mushika
June 8	Tokyo, Japan; Hard; W15; Singles and doubles draws	(South Korea) Im Hee-rae (South Korea) Kim Eun-chae; 6–2, 6–3	(Japan) Anri Nagata (Japan) Himari Satō	(Japan) Mayuka Aikawa (Japan) Kayo Nishimura	(Japan) Eri Shimizu (Japan) Natsuki Yoshimoto (Japan) Yuno Kitahara (Japan) Mao Mushika
June 8	Madrid, Spain; Clay; W15; Singles and doubles draws	(Spain) Ruth Roura Llaverías; 6–7^{(2–7)}, 6–2, 6–1	(Bulgaria) Briyana Ivanova	(Spain) Marta Soriano Santiago (Spain) Carmen Gallardo Guevara	(Estonia) Maileen Nuudi (Belgium) Margaux Maquet (Spain) Neus Torner Sensano (Spain) Alba Maria Coromina Boluda
June 8	Madrid, Spain; Clay; W15; Singles and doubles draws	(Spain) Alice Ferlito (Spain) Juliana Giaccio; 6–4, 6–3	(Spain) Georgina García Pérez (Belgium) Margaux Maquet	(Spain) Marta Soriano Santiago (Spain) Carmen Gallardo Guevara	(Estonia) Maileen Nuudi (Belgium) Margaux Maquet (Spain) Neus Torner Sensano (Spain) Alba Maria Coromina Boluda
June 8	Merzig, Germany; Clay; W15; Singles and doubles draws	(Germany) Valentina Steiner; 6–1, 6–0	(Belgium) Tamila Gadamauri	(Germany) Eva Bennemann (Luxembourg) Marie Weckerle	(Slovenia) Pia Lovrič (Germany) Luisa Meyer auf der Heide (Germany) Leonie Schuknecht (Argentina) Agustina Chlpac
June 8	Merzig, Germany; Clay; W15; Singles and doubles draws	(United States) Mia Slama (Germany) Valentina Steiner; 6–3, 6–4	(Ukraine) Anastasiia Firman (Ukraine) Daria Yesypchuk	(Germany) Eva Bennemann (Luxembourg) Marie Weckerle	(Slovenia) Pia Lovrič (Germany) Luisa Meyer auf der Heide (Germany) Leonie Schuknecht (Argentina) Agustina Chlpac
June 8	Kuršumlijska Banja, Serbia; Clay; W15; Singles and doubles draws	Ksenia Zaytseva; 6–1, 6–1	(Switzerland) Marie Mettraux	Anastasia Zolotareva (Italy) Emma Ottavia Ghirardato	(Switzerland) Iva Ivanović; Karine Sarkisova (Serbia) Anja Stanković (United States) Mia Horvit
June 8	Kuršumlijska Banja, Serbia; Clay; W15; Singles and doubles draws	(Greece) Marianne Argyrokastriti; Ksenia Zaytseva; 6–0, 7–6^{(7–4)}	(Serbia) Anja Stanković (France) Helena Stevic	Anastasia Zolotareva (Italy) Emma Ottavia Ghirardato	(Switzerland) Iva Ivanović; Karine Sarkisova (Serbia) Anja Stanković (United States) Mia Horvit
June 8	Kayseri, Turkiye; Hard; W15; Singles and doubles draws	(Turkey) İlay Yörük; 6–0, 6–3	(China) Mi Lan	(United States) Julia Adams (Iran) Mandegar Farzami	(South Korea) Jeong Ui-su; Ksenia Laskutova (Turkey) Semra Aksu (Ukraine) Sofiia Bielinska
June 8	Kayseri, Turkiye; Hard; W15; Singles and doubles draws	(Canada) Mariya Dobreva (Germany) Nikol Mircheva; 6–4, 6–4	(Turkey) Zeynep İlker; Elena Utkina	(United States) Julia Adams (Iran) Mandegar Farzami	(South Korea) Jeong Ui-su; Ksenia Laskutova (Turkey) Semra Aksu (Ukraine) Sofiia Bielinska
June 8	Monastir, Tunisia; Hard; W15; Singles and doubles draws	Victoria Milovanova; 6–0, 6–2	(United States) Aspen Schuman	(Argentina) Lourdes Ayala (South Korea) Ha Sun-min	(France) Julie Myatovic (Italy) Chiara Fornasieri (Slovakia) Nikola Daubnerová (France) Alice Battesti
June 8	Monastir, Tunisia; Hard; W15; Singles and doubles draws	(Slovakia) Nikola Daubnerová (France) Lucie Pawlak; 6–2, 6–2	Maria Andrienko (Mexico) Natalia Sousa Salazar	(Argentina) Lourdes Ayala (South Korea) Ha Sun-min	(France) Julie Myatovic (Italy) Chiara Fornasieri (Slovakia) Nikola Daubnerová (France) Alice Battesti
June 8	Los Angeles, United States; Hard; W15; Singles and doubles draws	Alina Shcherbinina; 6–0, 6–7^{(4–7)}, 7–5	(United States) Kaitlyn Carnicella	(Canada) Alexandra Vagramov (United States) Monika Ekstrand	(United States) Kristina Penickova; Veronika Miroshnichenko (Australia) Lily Taylor (United States) Maria Aytoyan
June 8	Los Angeles, United States; Hard; W15; Singles and doubles draws	(United States) Capucine Jauffret (United States) Kristina Penickova; 4–6, 6–2, [10–8]	(United States) Salma Ewing (Canada) Alexandra Vagramov	(Canada) Alexandra Vagramov (United States) Monika Ekstrand	(United States) Kristina Penickova; Veronika Miroshnichenko (Australia) Lily Taylor (United States) Maria Aytoyan
June 15	Internationaux de Tennis de Blois; Blois, France; Clay; W75; Singles – Doubles	(Malta) Francesca Curmi; 6–3, 7–5	Alevtina Ibragimova	(Turkey) İpek Öz (France) Lucie Nguyen Tan	(France) Jenny Lim (Argentina) Julia Riera (France) Amandine Hesse (Greece) Despina Papamichail
June 15	Internationaux de Tennis de Blois; Blois, France; Clay; W75; Singles – Doubles	(Romania) Oana Gavrilă (Greece) Sapfo Sakellaridi; 6–4, 6–2	(Ukraine) Anastasiia Firman (Italy) Isabella Maria Șerban	(Turkey) İpek Öz (France) Lucie Nguyen Tan	(France) Jenny Lim (Argentina) Julia Riera (France) Amandine Hesse (Greece) Despina Papamichail
June 15	Haskovo, Bulgaria; Clay; W50; Singles and doubles draws	(France) Séléna Janicijevic; 6–3, 2–6, 6–0	(Greece) Martha Matoula	(Bulgaria) Lidia Encheva (Turkey) Berfu Cengiz	(Kazakhstan) Zhibek Kulambayeva (Turkey) Çağla Büyükakçay (Poland) Gina Feistel (Italy) Dalila Spiteri
June 15	Haskovo, Bulgaria; Clay; W50; Singles and doubles draws	(Kazakhstan) Zhibek Kulambayeva (Ukraine) Valeriya Strakhova; 6–0, 6–4	(Greece) Martha Matoula (United States) Hibah Shaikh	(Bulgaria) Lidia Encheva (Turkey) Berfu Cengiz	(Kazakhstan) Zhibek Kulambayeva (Turkey) Çağla Büyükakçay (Poland) Gina Feistel (Italy) Dalila Spiteri
June 15	Taipei, Taiwan; Hard; W35; Singles and doubles draws	(South Korea) Back Da-yeon; 6–1, 7–5	(Japan) Haruka Kaji	(Japan) Hiromi Abe (Japan) Yuno Kitahara	(Japan) Naho Sato (Japan) Kayo Nishimura (Japan) Misaki Matsuda (Thailand) Thasaporn Naklo
June 15	Taipei, Taiwan; Hard; W35; Singles and doubles draws	(South Korea) Back Da-yeon (Chinese Taipei) Tsao Chia-yi; 7–5, 6–1	(Japan) Natsumi Kawaguchi (Japan) Ayano Shimizu	(Japan) Hiromi Abe (Japan) Yuno Kitahara	(Japan) Naho Sato (Japan) Kayo Nishimura (Japan) Misaki Matsuda (Thailand) Thasaporn Naklo
June 15	Zhengzhou, China; Hard; W35; Singles and doubles draws	Evialina Laskevich; 6–1, 6–4	(China) Wang Jiaqi	(China) Zhu Chenting; Daria Khomutsianskaya	(Japan) Rinko Matsuda (China) Zhang Junhan (China) Shi Han (China) Ren Yufei
June 15	Zhengzhou, China; Hard; W35; Singles and doubles draws	(China) Huang Yujia (China) Zheng Wushuang; 6–3, 6–2	Ekaterina Yashina (Kazakhstan) Sonja Zhiyenbayeva	(China) Zhu Chenting; Daria Khomutsianskaya	(Japan) Rinko Matsuda (China) Zhang Junhan (China) Shi Han (China) Ren Yufei
June 15	Tauste, Spain; Hard; W35+H; Singles and doubles draws	Anna Kubareva; 6–3, 6–3	(China) Wu Ruxi	(Serbia) Elena Milovanović (Spain) Celia Cerviño Ruiz	(France) Tiphanie Lemaître (China) Shao Yushan (Italy) Viola Turini (Spain) Meritxell Teixidó García
June 15	Tauste, Spain; Hard; W35+H; Singles and doubles draws	(China) Qu Yihan (China) Shao Yushan; 6–4, 7–5	(Spain) Alice Ferlito (Spain) Georgina García Pérez	(Serbia) Elena Milovanović (Spain) Celia Cerviño Ruiz	(France) Tiphanie Lemaître (China) Shao Yushan (Italy) Viola Turini (Spain) Meritxell Teixidó García
June 15	San Gregorio, Italy; Clay; W35; Singles and doubles draws	(Brazil) Gabriela Cé; 6–2, 6–3	(Latvia) Beatrise Zeltiņa	(Italy) Sofia Rocchetti (Peru) Lucciana Pérez Alarcón	(Italy) Vittoria Paganetti (Italy) Marta Lombardini (Argentina) Nadia Podoroska (Serbia) Natalija Senić
June 15	San Gregorio, Italy; Clay; W35; Singles and doubles draws	(Peru) Lucciana Pérez Alarcón (Italy) Miriana Tona; 7–6^{(7–2)}, 4–6, [10–7]	(Italy) Eleonora Alvisi (Italy) Francesca Gandolfi	(Italy) Sofia Rocchetti (Peru) Lucciana Pérez Alarcón	(Italy) Vittoria Paganetti (Italy) Marta Lombardini (Argentina) Nadia Podoroska (Serbia) Natalija Senić
June 15	Klosters, Switzerland; Clay; W35; Singles and doubles draws	(Germany) Julia Stusek; 7–5, 2–6, 7–6^{(13–11)}	(Spain) Berta Passola	(Hungary) Adrienn Nagy (Germany) Emily Seibold	(Germany) Eva Marie Voracek (Germany) Mara Guth (Switzerland) Elsa Bonelli (Italy) Laura Mair
June 15	Klosters, Switzerland; Clay; W35; Singles and doubles draws	(Czech Republic) Michaela Bayerlová (Germany) Eva Marie Voracek; 4–6, 7–6^{(7–1)}, [10–5]	(Netherlands) Merel Hoedt (Hungary) Adrienn Nagy	(Hungary) Adrienn Nagy (Germany) Emily Seibold	(Germany) Eva Marie Voracek (Germany) Mara Guth (Switzerland) Elsa Bonelli (Italy) Laura Mair
June 15	Bolszewo, Poland; Clay; W35; Singles and doubles draws	(Germany) Joëlle Steur; 6–3, 7–5	(Czech Republic) Julie Paštiková	(Czech Republic) Alena Kovačková (Argentina) Victoria Bosio	(Argentina) Martina Capurro Taborda (Poland) Weronika Falkowska (Poland) Weronika Ewald (Romania) Briana Szabó
June 15	Bolszewo, Poland; Clay; W35; Singles and doubles draws	(Germany) Joëlle Steur (Romania) Briana Szabó; 2–3 ret.	(Czech Republic) Amy Suchá (Poland) Inka Wawrzkiewicz	(Czech Republic) Alena Kovačková (Argentina) Victoria Bosio	(Argentina) Martina Capurro Taborda (Poland) Weronika Falkowska (Poland) Weronika Ewald (Romania) Briana Szabó
June 15	Ystad, Sweden; Clay; W35; Singles and doubles draws	(Sweden) Lea Nilsson; 4–6, 6–2, 6–0	(United States) Madison Sieg	(United States) Thea Frodin (Czech Republic) Lucie Petruželová	(Sweden) Linea Bajraliu (Germany) Ida Wobker (New Zealand) Valentina Ivanov (Germany) Valentina Steiner
June 15	Ystad, Sweden; Clay; W35; Singles and doubles draws	(Netherlands) Isis Louise van den Broek (Netherlands) Sarah van Emst; 5–7, 7–6^{(7–3)}, [10–8]	(Spain) Lucía Cortez Llorca (Switzerland) Katerina Tsygourova	(United States) Thea Frodin (Czech Republic) Lucie Petruželová	(Sweden) Linea Bajraliu (Germany) Ida Wobker (New Zealand) Valentina Ivanov (Germany) Valentina Steiner
June 15	Morocco Tennis Tour; Mohammedia, Morocco; Clay; W35; Singles and doubles draws	Daria Egorova; 3–6, 6–4, 7–6^{(7–5)}	(Slovakia) Nina Vargová	(Serbia) Luna Vujović (Italy) Martina Colmegna	Elina Nepliy (Morocco) Diae El Jardi (India) Vaidehi Chaudhari (Italy) Federica Sacco
June 15	Morocco Tennis Tour; Mohammedia, Morocco; Clay; W35; Singles and doubles draws	Elina Nepliy (India) Vasanti Shinde; 3–6, 6–4, [10–4]	(Italy) Martina Colmegna (Italy) Federica Sacco	(Serbia) Luna Vujović (Italy) Martina Colmegna	Elina Nepliy (Morocco) Diae El Jardi (India) Vaidehi Chaudhari (Italy) Federica Sacco
June 15	Sapporo, Japan; Hard; W15; Singles and doubles draws	(Japan) Ayumi Miyamoto; 6–4, 6–1	(New Zealand) Aishi Das	(Japan) Sae Noguchi (South Korea) Jang Ga-eul	(China) Zhang Ying (Japan) Mutsumi Uemura (Japan) Yuzuha Negishi (Japan) Yuka Matsumoto
June 15	Sapporo, Japan; Hard; W15; Singles and doubles draws	(South Korea) Im Hee-rae (South Korea) Kim Eun-chae; 6–4, 6–3	(Japan) Mana Kawamura (Japan) Yui Ohwaki	(Japan) Sae Noguchi (South Korea) Jang Ga-eul	(China) Zhang Ying (Japan) Mutsumi Uemura (Japan) Yuzuha Negishi (Japan) Yuka Matsumoto
June 15	Dinard, France; Clay; W15; Singles and doubles draws	(Netherlands) Antonia Stoyanov; 6–1, 2–6, 7–6^{(11–9)}	(Germany) Marie Vogt	(Belgium) Lisa Claeys (Belgium) Margaux Maquet	(United States) Mia Slama (Belgium) Tilwith Di Girolami (France) Carla Grignac (Germany) Franziska Sziedat
June 15	Dinard, France; Clay; W15; Singles and doubles draws	(Argentina) Sol Ailin Larraya Guidi (Netherlands) Antonia Stoyanov; 6–2, 6–2	(France) Milena Ciocan (France) Juliette Trunet	(Belgium) Lisa Claeys (Belgium) Margaux Maquet	(United States) Mia Slama (Belgium) Tilwith Di Girolami (France) Carla Grignac (Germany) Franziska Sziedat
June 15	Bucharest, Romania; Clay; W15; Singles and doubles draws	(Ukraine) Daria Yesypchuk; 3–6, 6–4, 6–4	(Romania) Lavinia Tănăsie	(Romania) Sara Victoria Bălan (Romania) Diana-Ioana Simionescu	(Romania) Iulia Maria Buculei (Romania) Anastasia Safta (Romania) Simona Ogescu (Romania) Alesia Breaz
June 15	Bucharest, Romania; Clay; W15; Singles and doubles draws	(Romania) Eva Maria Ionescu (Romania) Lavinia Tănăsie; 6–4, 6–3	(Italy) Lavinia Luciano (Romania) Diana-Ioana Simionescu	(Romania) Sara Victoria Bălan (Romania) Diana-Ioana Simionescu	(Romania) Iulia Maria Buculei (Romania) Anastasia Safta (Romania) Simona Ogescu (Romania) Alesia Breaz
June 15	Kuršumlijska Banja, Serbia; Clay; W15; Singles and doubles draws	(Czech Republic) Amelie Justine Hejtmanek; 6–1, 6–4	(Greece) Marianne Argyrokastriti	Ksenia Zaytseva (Switzerland) Marie Mettraux	(Italy) Emma Ottavia Ghirardato (Spain) Ana Giraldi Requena (Slovenia) Petja Drame (Spain) Eugenia Zozaya Menendez
June 15	Kuršumlijska Banja, Serbia; Clay; W15; Singles and doubles draws	(Switzerland) Marie Mettraux (France) Nina Radovanović; 6–2, 7–5	(Italy) Emma Ottavia Ghirardato (Spain) Eugenia Zozaya Menendez	Ksenia Zaytseva (Switzerland) Marie Mettraux	(Italy) Emma Ottavia Ghirardato (Spain) Ana Giraldi Requena (Slovenia) Petja Drame (Spain) Eugenia Zozaya Menendez
June 15	Kayseri, Turkiye; Hard; W15; Singles and doubles draws	(Serbia) Darja Suvirdjonkova; 7–5, 7–5	(United States) Julia Adams	(Latvia) Adelina Lachinova (China) Mi Lan	(Turkey) İlay Yörük (Turkey) Ada Kumru; Ksenia Laskutova (Egypt) Jana Hossam Salah
June 15	Kayseri, Turkiye; Hard; W15; Singles and doubles draws	(United States) Julia Adams (United States) Allison Nicole Isaacs; 7–5, 6–4	(Turkey) Semra Aksu (Turkey) Simay Keles	(Latvia) Adelina Lachinova (China) Mi Lan	(Turkey) İlay Yörük (Turkey) Ada Kumru; Ksenia Laskutova (Egypt) Jana Hossam Salah
June 15	Monastir, Tunisia; Hard; W15; Singles and doubles draws	(France) Lucie Pawlak; 6–3, 1–0 ret.	(Italy) Matilde Mariani	Victoria Milovanova (Ukraine) Mariia Nozdrachova	(South Korea) Ha Sun-min (United Kingdom) Lois Newberry (Ukraine) Yelyzaveta Chainykova (Poland) Dominika Podhajecka
June 15	Monastir, Tunisia; Hard; W15; Singles and doubles draws	(Slovakia) Nikola Daubnerová (France) Lucie Pawlak; 6–1, 6–3	(Italy) Francesca Dell'Edera (Italy) Matilde Mariani	Victoria Milovanova (Ukraine) Mariia Nozdrachova	(South Korea) Ha Sun-min (United Kingdom) Lois Newberry (Ukraine) Yelyzaveta Chainykova (Poland) Dominika Podhajecka
June 15	Irvine, United States; Hard; W15; Singles and doubles draws	Alina Shcherbinina; 6–2, 6–4	(United States) Monika Ekstrand	(Mexico) Midori Castillo Meza (United States) Kaitlyn Carnicella	(Canada) Isabella Marton (United States) Alexis Nguyen; Veronika Miroshnichenko (United States) Theadora Rabman
June 15	Irvine, United States; Hard; W15; Singles and doubles draws	(Australia) Lily Fairclough (United States) Kate Fakih; 7–6^{(8–6)}, 6–4	(Mexico) Midori Castillo Meza (United States) Brandelyn Fulgenzi	(Mexico) Midori Castillo Meza (United States) Kaitlyn Carnicella	(Canada) Isabella Marton (United States) Alexis Nguyen; Veronika Miroshnichenko (United States) Theadora Rabman
June 15	Luque, Paraguay; Clay; W15; Singles and doubles draws	(Chile) Antonia Vergara Rivera; 7–5, 7–5	(Argentina) Justina María González Daniele	(Paraguay) Leyla Fiorella Brítez Risso (Argentina) María Florencia Urrutia	(Argentina) Josefina Estévez (Argentina) Luciana Moyano (Peru) Romina Ccuno (Colombia) María Herazo
June 15	Luque, Paraguay; Clay; W15; Singles and doubles draws	(Brazil) Ana Candiotto (Argentina) Justina María González Daniele; 7–6^{(7–4)}, 7–5	(Argentina) Luciana Moyano (Ecuador) Camila Romero	(Paraguay) Leyla Fiorella Brítez Risso (Argentina) María Florencia Urrutia	(Argentina) Josefina Estévez (Argentina) Luciana Moyano (Peru) Romina Ccuno (Colombia) María Herazo
June 22	Palma del Río, Spain; Hard; W50; Singles and doubles draws	(Netherlands) Eva Vedder; 6–4, 6–4	(Australia) Elena Micic	(France) Amandine Hesse (Turkey) Ayla Aksu	(China) Shi Han (China) Tian Fangran (United States) Carolyn Ansari; Anna Kubareva
June 22	Palma del Río, Spain; Hard; W50; Singles and doubles draws	(India) Rutuja Bhosale (China) Tian Fangran; 6–3, 6–4	(Australia) Elena Micic (Australia) Belle Thompson	(France) Amandine Hesse (Turkey) Ayla Aksu	(China) Shi Han (China) Tian Fangran (United States) Carolyn Ansari; Anna Kubareva
June 22	Gdańsk, Poland; Clay; W50; Singles and doubles draws	(Ukraine) Anastasiia Sobolieva; 6–4, 6–2	(Poland) Gina Feistel	(Poland) Weronika Ewald (Germany) Mina Hodzic	(Czech Republic) Barbora Palicová (Poland) Daria Kuczer (United States) Hibah Shaikh (France) Chloé Paquet
June 22	Gdańsk, Poland; Clay; W50; Singles and doubles draws	(Poland) Weronika Falkowska (Spain) Georgina García Pérez; 3–6, 7–5, [11–9]	(Kazakhstan) Zhibek Kulambayeva (Hungary) Amarissa Tóth	(Poland) Weronika Ewald (Germany) Mina Hodzic	(Czech Republic) Barbora Palicová (Poland) Daria Kuczer (United States) Hibah Shaikh (France) Chloé Paquet
June 22	Taipei, Taiwan; Hard; W35; Singles and doubles draws	(Indonesia) Priska Nugroho; 7–6^{(8–6)}, 6–3	(Japan) Sakura Hosogi	(South Korea) Lee Gyeong-seo (Japan) Hikaru Sato	(Chinese Taipei) Tsao Chia-yi (Chinese Taipei) Yang Ya-yi (New Zealand) Aishi Das (South Korea) Back Da-yeon
June 22	Taipei, Taiwan; Hard; W35; Singles and doubles draws	(Chinese Taipei) Lee Ya-hsin (Chinese Taipei) Tsao Chia-yi; 6–0, 6–4	(Japan) Funa Kozaki (Japan) Mao Mushika	(South Korea) Lee Gyeong-seo (Japan) Hikaru Sato	(Chinese Taipei) Tsao Chia-yi (Chinese Taipei) Yang Ya-yi (New Zealand) Aishi Das (South Korea) Back Da-yeon
June 22	Tarvisio, Italy; Clay; W35; Singles and doubles draws	(Italy) Deborah Chiesa; 6–0, 6–1	(Slovakia) Radka Zelníčková	(Czech Republic) Aneta Laboutková (Italy) Noemi Basiletti	(Croatia) Lucija Ćirić Bagarić (Brazil) Gabriela Cé (Italy) Federica Trevisan (Slovenia) Alja Senica
June 22	Tarvisio, Italy; Clay; W35; Singles and doubles draws	(Czech Republic) Aneta Kučmová (Czech Republic) Aneta Laboutková; 6–0, 6–3	(Greece) Sapfo Sakellaridi (Slovakia) Radka Zelníčková	(Czech Republic) Aneta Laboutková (Italy) Noemi Basiletti	(Croatia) Lucija Ćirić Bagarić (Brazil) Gabriela Cé (Italy) Federica Trevisan (Slovenia) Alja Senica
June 22	Georgia's Rome Tennis Open; Rome, United States; Hard; W35; Singles and doubles draws	(United States) Ayana Akli; 7–6^{(7–3)}, 6–4	(United States) Amelia Honer	(India) Sahaja Yamalapalli (United States) Jo-yee Chan	(United States) Madison Brengle (United States) Savannah Broadus (Canada) Ariana Arseneault (Japan) Ena Koike
June 22	Georgia's Rome Tennis Open; Rome, United States; Hard; W35; Singles and doubles draws	(United States) Jaeda Daniel (Australia) Lily Fairclough; 7–5, 6–4	(United States) Savannah Broadus (United States) Kylie Collins	(India) Sahaja Yamalapalli (United States) Jo-yee Chan	(United States) Madison Brengle (United States) Savannah Broadus (Canada) Ariana Arseneault (Japan) Ena Koike
June 22	Sapporo, Japan; Hard; W15; Singles and doubles draws	(Japan) Miho Kuramochi; 6–3, 3–6, 7–6^{(11–9)}	(Japan) Ayumi Miyamoto	(Japan) Sae Noguchi (South Korea) Jang Ga-eul	(Japan) Yui Ohwaki (Japan) Shiho Tsujioka (Japan) Mayuka Aikawa (China) Zhang Ying
June 22	Sapporo, Japan; Hard; W15; Singles and doubles draws	(Japan) Mayuka Aikawa (Thailand) Kamonwan Yodpetch; 6–3, 3–6, [10–8]	(South Korea) Im Hee-rae (South Korea) Kim Eun-chae	(Japan) Sae Noguchi (South Korea) Jang Ga-eul	(Japan) Yui Ohwaki (Japan) Shiho Tsujioka (Japan) Mayuka Aikawa (China) Zhang Ying
June 22	Ma'anshan, China; Hard (i); W15; Singles and doubles draws	Evialina Laskevich; 6–1, 4–6, 6–1	(China) Guo Meiqi	(China) Wang Jiaqi (Singapore) Eva Marie Desvignes	(China) Zhu Chenting (China) Lu Jingjing (China) Wang Jiayi; Anna Snigireva
June 22	Ma'anshan, China; Hard (i); W15; Singles and doubles draws	(China) Guo Meiqi (China) Zhu Chenting; 6–7^{(2–7)}, 6–1, [10–4]	(China) Li Yuyao (China) Luo Xi	(China) Wang Jiaqi (Singapore) Eva Marie Desvignes	(China) Zhu Chenting (China) Lu Jingjing (China) Wang Jiayi; Anna Snigireva
June 22	Alkmaar, Netherlands; Clay; W15; Singles and doubles draws	(Netherlands) Isis Louise van den Broek; 6–4, 3–6, 6–2	(Belgium) Margaux Maquet	(France) Charlotte Narti (Netherlands) Lian Tran	(Netherlands) Merel Hoedt (Belgium) Amélie van Impe (France) Dune Vaissaud (Slovakia) Irina Balus
June 22	Alkmaar, Netherlands; Clay; W15; Singles and doubles draws	(Belgium) Kaat Coppez (Belgium) Amélie van Impe; 6–0, 6–4	(Netherlands) Annika Barth (Netherlands) Jinte Eve De Boer	(France) Charlotte Narti (Netherlands) Lian Tran	(Netherlands) Merel Hoedt (Belgium) Amélie van Impe (France) Dune Vaissaud (Slovakia) Irina Balus
June 22	Kamen, Germany; Clay; W15; Singles and doubles draws	(New Zealand) Valentina Ivanov; 3–6, 6–1, 7–6^{(8–6)}	(Germany) Josy Daems	(Germany) Victoria Pohle (Germany) Eva Marie Voracek	(United States) Kailey Evans (Romania) Arina Vasilescu (Germany) Mara Guth (Ukraine) Anastasiia Firman
June 22	Kamen, Germany; Clay; W15; Singles and doubles draws	(Germany) Josy Daems (Ukraine) Anastasiia Firman; 1–6, 6–3, [10–5]	(Chile) Camila Rodero (Germany) Sonja Zhenikhova	(Germany) Victoria Pohle (Germany) Eva Marie Voracek	(United States) Kailey Evans (Romania) Arina Vasilescu (Germany) Mara Guth (Ukraine) Anastasiia Firman
June 22	Galați, Romania; Clay; W15; Singles and doubles draws	(Romania) Giulia Safina Popa; 6–4, 6–3	(Italy) Chiara Fornasieri	(Romania) Anastasia Safta (Romania) Sara Victoria Bălan	(Romania) Irina Fetecău (Italy) Lavinia Luciano (United Kingdom) Allegra Korpanec Davies (Spain) Marta Soriano Santiago
June 22	Galați, Romania; Clay; W15; Singles and doubles draws	(Romania) Alesia Breaz (Romania) Cristiana Nicoleta Todoni; 6–1, 5–7, [10–8]	(United Kingdom) Melissa Boyden (India) Madhurima Sawant	(Romania) Anastasia Safta (Romania) Sara Victoria Bălan	(Romania) Irina Fetecău (Italy) Lavinia Luciano (United Kingdom) Allegra Korpanec Davies (Spain) Marta Soriano Santiago
June 22	Kuršumlijska Banja, Serbia; Clay; W15; Singles and doubles draws	Ksenia Zaytseva; 7–5, 6–3	(France) Nina Radovanović	(Serbia) Dušica Popovski (Serbia) Anja Stanković	(Serbia) Natalija Senić (China) Jialin Tian (United States) Mia Horvit (Bulgaria) Julia Stamatova
June 22	Kuršumlijska Banja, Serbia; Clay; W15; Singles and doubles draws	(Serbia) Natalija Senić (Serbia) Anja Stanković; Walkover	(Romania) Patricia Georgiana Goina (Czech Republic) Amelie Justine Hejtmanek	(Serbia) Dušica Popovski (Serbia) Anja Stanković	(Serbia) Natalija Senić (China) Jialin Tian (United States) Mia Horvit (Bulgaria) Julia Stamatova
June 22	Kayseri, Turkiye; Hard; W15; Singles and doubles draws	(Turkey) Duru Söke; 6–4, 7–5	(Australia) Alana Subasic	(Ukraine) Kateryna Lazarenko (Egypt) Jana Hossam Salah	(Turkey) Deniz Dilek (Turkey) Doğa Türkmen (Turkey) İrem Kurt (China) Mi Lan
June 22	Kayseri, Turkiye; Hard; W15; Singles and doubles draws	(Turkey) İrem Kurt (Australia) Alana Subasic; 6–4, 6–3	(Turkey) Duru Söke (Turkey) Doğa Türkmen	(Ukraine) Kateryna Lazarenko (Egypt) Jana Hossam Salah	(Turkey) Deniz Dilek (Turkey) Doğa Türkmen (Turkey) İrem Kurt (China) Mi Lan
June 22	Monastir, Tunisia; Hard; W15; Singles and doubles draws	Arina Arifullina; 6–0, 6–1	(Germany) Karla Bartel	(France) Alyssa Réguer (Czech Republic) Lenka Munzarová	(Norway) Emily Sartz-Lunde (Argentina) Lourdes Ayala (Italy) Matilde Mariani (Ukraine) Yelyzaveta Chainykova
June 22	Monastir, Tunisia; Hard; W15; Singles and doubles draws	(France) Marie Villet (Germany) Anja Wildgruber; 6–3, 6–2	(Latvia) Daniela Dārta Feldmane (Ukraine) Mariia Nozdrachova	(France) Alyssa Réguer (Czech Republic) Lenka Munzarová	(Norway) Emily Sartz-Lunde (Argentina) Lourdes Ayala (Italy) Matilde Mariani (Ukraine) Yelyzaveta Chainykova
June 22	Claremont, United States; Hard; W15; Singles and doubles draws	(United States) Alexis Nguyen; 6–2, 6–3	(United States) Alyssa Ahn	(Canada) Alexandra Vagramov (Mexico) Midori Castillo Meza	(United States) Thara Gowda (United States) Anne Christine Lütkemeyer Obregon (United States) Salma Ewing (United States) Amy Zhu
June 22	Claremont, United States; Hard; W15; Singles and doubles draws	(United States) Kayla Chung (United States) Ahmani Guichard; 6–3, 6–2	(United States) Paola Lopez (United States) Amy Zhu	(Canada) Alexandra Vagramov (Mexico) Midori Castillo Meza	(United States) Thara Gowda (United States) Anne Christine Lütkemeyer Obregon (United States) Salma Ewing (United States) Amy Zhu
June 22	Asunción, Paraguay; Clay; W15; Singles and doubles draws	(Brazil) Ana Candiotto; 6–3, 7–6^{(7–5)}	(Argentina) Luciana Moyano	(Paraguay) Leyla Fiorella Brítez Risso (Ecuador) Camila Romero	(Chile) Antonia Vergara Rivera (Dominican Republic) Ana Zamburek (Argentina) Sofía Meabe (Argentina) Justina María González Daniele
June 22	Asunción, Paraguay; Clay; W15; Singles and doubles draws	(United States) Isabella Barrera Aguirre (Argentina) Sofía Meabe; 6–2, 7–5	(Peru) Romina Ccuno (Brazil) Júlia Konishi Camargo Silva	(Paraguay) Leyla Fiorella Brítez Risso (Ecuador) Camila Romero	(Chile) Antonia Vergara Rivera (Dominican Republic) Ana Zamburek (Argentina) Sofía Meabe (Argentina) Justina María González Daniele
June 29	Cary Tennis Classic; Cary, United States; Hard; W100; Singles – Doubles	(Italy) Lucrezia Stefanini; 6–3, 6–2	(United States) Savannah Broadus	(Japan) Ena Koike (China) Ma Yexin	(United States) Lea Ma (United States) Tatum Evans (United States) Mia Slama; Kristina Liutova
June 29	Cary Tennis Classic; Cary, United States; Hard; W100; Singles – Doubles	(United States) Catherine Harrison (United States) Dalayna Hewitt; 6–4, 6–2	(Japan) Hiroko Kuwata (India) Ankita Raina	(Japan) Ena Koike (China) Ma Yexin	(United States) Lea Ma (United States) Tatum Evans (United States) Mia Slama; Kristina Liutova
June 29	Elvas, Portugal; Hard; W50; Singles and doubles draws	(China) Shi Han; 6–1, 6–1	(Portugal) Matilde Jorge	(United States) Hina Inoue (United States) Carol Young Suh Lee	(Ukraine) Veronika Podrez (Netherlands) Stéphanie Visscher (Japan) Nao Hibino (Slovakia) Katarína Kužmová
June 29	Elvas, Portugal; Hard; W50; Singles and doubles draws	(Australia) Elena Micic (China) Shi Han; 6–4, 6–3	(India) Vaishnavi Adkar (India) Rutuja Bhosale	(United States) Hina Inoue (United States) Carol Young Suh Lee	(Ukraine) Veronika Podrez (Netherlands) Stéphanie Visscher (Japan) Nao Hibino (Slovakia) Katarína Kužmová
June 29	Stuttgart-Vaihingen, Germany; Clay; W50; Singles and doubles draws	(Ukraine) Anastasiia Sobolieva; 3–6, 7–6^{(7–5)}, 6–2	(France) Alice Tubello	(Italy) Lisa Pigato (Argentina) Julia Riera	(Argentina) María Lourdes Carlé (Germany) Tessa Brockmann (Georgia (country)) Ekaterine Gorgodze (Argentina) Martina Capurro Taborda
June 29	Stuttgart-Vaihingen, Germany; Clay; W50; Singles and doubles draws	(Argentina) María Lourdes Carlé (Argentina) Julia Riera; 6–2, 6–3	(Ukraine) Anastasiia Sobolieva (Ukraine) Anastasiya Zaparyniuk	(Italy) Lisa Pigato (Argentina) Julia Riera	(Argentina) María Lourdes Carlé (Germany) Tessa Brockmann (Georgia (country)) Ekaterine Gorgodze (Argentina) Martina Capurro Taborda
June 29	Aix-les-Bains, France; Clay; W35; Singles and doubles draws	(Switzerland) Alina Granwehr; 6–3, 6–3	(Italy) Aurora Zantedeschi	(Morocco) Yasmine Kabbaj (United States) Madison Sieg	(France) Lucie Nguyen Tan (Spain) Carlota Martínez Círez (France) Astrid Lew Yan Foon (Sweden) Lisa Zaar
June 29	Aix-les-Bains, France; Clay; W35; Singles and doubles draws	(Netherlands) Jasmijn Gimbrère (Greece) Sapfo Sakellaridi; 6–7^{(4–7)}, 7–5, [10–7]	(France) Yara Bartashevich (France) Lucie Nguyen Tan	(Morocco) Yasmine Kabbaj (United States) Madison Sieg	(France) Lucie Nguyen Tan (Spain) Carlota Martínez Círez (France) Astrid Lew Yan Foon (Sweden) Lisa Zaar
June 29	Amstelveen Women's Open; Amstelveen, Netherlands; Clay; W35; Singles and doubles draws	(Poland) Weronika Falkowska; 6–2, 7–6^{(7–4)}	(Netherlands) Anouck Vrancken Peeters	(Romania) Maria Sara Popa (Romania) Carmen Andreea Herea	(Kazakhstan) Zhibek Kulambayeva (Bulgaria) Lia Karatancheva (Czech Republic) Alena Kovačková (Egypt) Sandra Samir
June 29	Amstelveen Women's Open; Amstelveen, Netherlands; Clay; W35; Singles and doubles draws	(Netherlands) Isis Louise van den Broek (Netherlands) Sarah van Emst; 6–4, 2–6, [10–7]	(Netherlands) Joy de Zeeuw (Netherlands) Antonia Stoyanov	(Romania) Maria Sara Popa (Romania) Carmen Andreea Herea	(Kazakhstan) Zhibek Kulambayeva (Bulgaria) Lia Karatancheva (Czech Republic) Alena Kovačková (Egypt) Sandra Samir
June 29	Ma'anshan, China; Hard (i); W15; Singles and doubles draws	(China) Yuan Chengyiyi; 7–6^{(7–3)}, 6–2	Anna Snigireva	(China) Guo Meiqi (China) Wang Jiayi	(China) Ye Shiyu (China) Zhu Chenting; Maria Kalyakina (China) Wang Yuhan
June 29	Ma'anshan, China; Hard (i); W15; Singles and doubles draws	(China) Luo Xi (China) Wang Jiayi; 0–6, 6–3, [11–9]	(China) Wang Meiling (China) Yuan Chengyiyi	(China) Guo Meiqi (China) Wang Jiayi	(China) Ye Shiyu (China) Zhu Chenting; Maria Kalyakina (China) Wang Yuhan
June 29	Getxo, Spain; Clay (i); W15; Singles and doubles draws	(Belgium) Lisa Claeys; 6–2, 3–6, 6–4	(Spain) Neus Torner Sensano	(United States) Shannon Lam (Belgium) Amélie van Impe	(Spain) Esther López Alcaraz (Norway) Astrid Brune Olsen (Spain) Eugenia Zozaya Menéndez (Spain) Ruth Roura Llaverías
June 29	Getxo, Spain; Clay (i); W15; Singles and doubles draws	(United States) Maxine Murphy (New Zealand) Elyse Tse; 6–7^{(7–9)}, 6–1, [10–6]	(Spain) Cayetana Gay (Spain) Cristina Ramos Sierra	(United States) Shannon Lam (Belgium) Amélie van Impe	(Spain) Esther López Alcaraz (Norway) Astrid Brune Olsen (Spain) Eugenia Zozaya Menéndez (Spain) Ruth Roura Llaverías
June 29	Mogyoród, Hungary; Clay; W15; Singles and doubles draws	(Hungary) Adrienn Nagy; 2–6, 6–3, 6–3	(Slovakia) Eszter Méri	(Denmark) Rebecca Munk Mortensen (Romania) Ștefania Bojica	(Czech Republic) Emma Slavíková (Switzerland) Marie Mettraux (Slovakia) Salma Drugdová; Valeriia Artemeva
June 29	Mogyoród, Hungary; Clay; W15; Singles and doubles draws	(Hungary) Luca Kalman (Hungary) Anna Mihálka; 7–6^{(7–2)}, 7–6^{(7–5)}	(Romania) Ștefania Bojica (Switzerland) Marie Mettraux	(Denmark) Rebecca Munk Mortensen (Romania) Ștefania Bojica	(Czech Republic) Emma Slavíková (Switzerland) Marie Mettraux (Slovakia) Salma Drugdová; Valeriia Artemeva
June 29	Kuršumlijska Banja, Serbia; Clay; W15; Singles and doubles draws	(Serbia) Anja Stanković; 7–5, 6–1	(Latvia) Elza Tomase	(France) Nina Radovanović (Germany) Anna Petkovic	(Serbia) Jana Bojović (Bulgaria) Julia Stamatova; Kristina Kovgan (Serbia) Dunja Marić
June 29	Kuršumlijska Banja, Serbia; Clay; W15; Singles and doubles draws	(Hong Kong) Adithya Karunaratne (Latvia) Elza Tomase; 6–0, 6–0	(Montenegro) Tea Nikčević (Serbia) Klara Vaja	(France) Nina Radovanović (Germany) Anna Petkovic	(Serbia) Jana Bojović (Bulgaria) Julia Stamatova; Kristina Kovgan (Serbia) Dunja Marić
June 29	Kayseri, Turkiye; Hard; W15; Singles and doubles draws	(Turkey) Duru Söke; 6–3, 7–5	(Australia) Melisa Ercan	(Iran) Mandegar Farzami (Turkey) İrem Kurt	(China) Mi Lan (Germany) Franziska Sziedat (Czech Republic) Amélie Šmejkalová (Turkey) İlay Yörük
June 29	Kayseri, Turkiye; Hard; W15; Singles and doubles draws	(Turkey) Duru Söke (Turkey) Doğa Türkmen; 6–3, 7–6^{(7–4)}	(New Caledonia) Leilany Ipunesso (China) Mi Lan	(Iran) Mandegar Farzami (Turkey) İrem Kurt	(China) Mi Lan (Germany) Franziska Sziedat (Czech Republic) Amélie Šmejkalová (Turkey) İlay Yörük
June 29	Hillcrest, South Africa; Hard; W15; Singles and doubles draws	Polina Leykina; 6–4, 6–4	(Switzerland) Jenny Dürst	(South Africa) Marilouise van Zyl (South Africa) Isabella Kruger	(Israel) Mika Buchnik (South Africa) Donna Le Roux (Denmark) Elena Jamshidi; Ksenia Smirnova
June 29	Hillcrest, South Africa; Hard; W15; Singles and doubles draws	(France) Astrid Cirotte (Switzerland) Jenny Dürst; 6–7^{(4–7)}, 6–3, [10–8]	(South Africa) Morgan Jordaan (South Africa) Donna Le Roux	(South Africa) Marilouise van Zyl (South Africa) Isabella Kruger	(Israel) Mika Buchnik (South Africa) Donna Le Roux (Denmark) Elena Jamshidi; Ksenia Smirnova
June 29	Monastir, Tunisia; Hard; W15; Singles and doubles draws	(Norway) Emily Sartz-Lunde; 6–3, 7–5	(United Kingdom) Eliz Maloney	(Egypt) Yasmin Ezzat; Maria Andrienko	(United Kingdom) Esther Adeshina (United Kingdom) Eva Shaw (Tunisia) Nour Sahnoun (France) Margaux Komano
June 29	Monastir, Tunisia; Hard; W15; Singles and doubles draws	(Egypt) Yasmin Ezzat (France) Marie Villet; 3–6, 6–1, [10–7]	(Egypt) Aya El Sayed (Egypt) Nada Fouad	(Egypt) Yasmin Ezzat; Maria Andrienko	(United Kingdom) Esther Adeshina (United Kingdom) Eva Shaw (Tunisia) Nour Sahnoun (France) Margaux Komano
June 29	San Diego, United States; Hard; W15; Singles and doubles draws	Alina Shcherbinina; 6–3, 7–6^{(7–1)}	(United States) Kate Fakih	(Canada) Annabelle Xu (United States) Salma Ewing	(United States) Maria Aytoyan (United States) Katherine Hui (United States) Anya Arora (United States) Chan Jo-yee
June 29	San Diego, United States; Hard; W15; Singles and doubles draws	(United States) Anne Christine Lütkemeyer Obregon (Ukraine) Anita Sahdiieva; 6–1, 6–3	(United States) Salma Ewing (Canada) Alexandra Vagramov	(Canada) Annabelle Xu (United States) Salma Ewing	(United States) Maria Aytoyan (United States) Katherine Hui (United States) Anya Arora (United States) Chan Jo-yee
