= Kaat Coppez =

Belgian tennis player (born 2005)

- with Lian Tran, 2026
- Country (sports): Belgium
- Born: 17 March 2005 (age 21) Geraardsbergen, Belgium
- Plays: Righ (two-handed backhand)
- Prize money: $15,551

Singles
- Career record: 56–53
- Highest ranking: No. 984 (August 11, 2025)
- Current ranking: No. 1169 (August 03, 2026)

Doubles
- Career record: 48–36
- Career titles: 8 ITF
- Highest ranking: No. 563 (July 13, 2026)
- Current ranking: No. 578 (August 03, 2026)
- Last updated on: 10 August 2026.

Kaat Coppez (born March 17, 2005) is a Belgian tennis player. She has a career-high WTA doubles ranking of world No. 563, achieved on July 13, 2026.

== Early life ==
Born in Geraardsbergen, Coppez began playing tennis with the support of her mother and sister, and spent some time at Tennis Vlaanderen. For the past few years, she has been training at the Kim Clijsters Tennis Academy in Bree. In tennis, her idols are Kim Clijsters, Roger Federer and Caroline Wozniacki. From 2025, Coppez is coached by former Belgian tennis player Alison Van Uytvanck.

== Career ==
In August 2024, she won the first championship of her career. Coppez and compatriot Romane Longueville won the women's doubles final at the ITF World Tennis Tour event in Wanfercée-Baulet, defeating Australian Ella Simmons and Indonesian player Janice Tjen. In September 2024, she and compatriot Amelie Van Impe won the women's doubles final at an ITF event in Ceuta.

In September 2025, she and American Savannah Broadus won the women's doubles final at the ITF Tennis Tour tournament in Kayseri, defeating British Esther Adeshina and Australian Tenika McGiffin.

In August 2026, she won the W75 Flanders Ladies Trophy held in Koksijde, Belgium. In the final, she and her Dutch partner, Loes Ebeling Koning, defeated American Julia Adams and Dutch player Merel Hoedt in three sets.

== ITF Circuit finals ==
=== Doubles: 14 (8 titles, 6 runner-ups) ===
Legend W75 tournaments (1–0) W35 tournaments (0–1) W15 tournaments (7–5)	Finals by surface Hard (3–1) Clay (5–5)

Result	W–L	Date	Tournament	Tier	Surface	Partner	Opponents	Score
Win	1–0	Aug 2024	ITF Wanfercée-Baulet, Belgium	W15	Clay	(Belgium) Romane Longueville	(Australia) Ella Simmons (Indonesia) Janice Tjen	6–4, 7–6^{(3)}
Win	2–0	Sep 2024	ITF Ceuta, Spain	W15	Hard	(Belgium) Amélie van Impe	(Spain) Judith Perelló Saavedra (Spain) Alba Rey García	3–2 ret.
Loss	2–1	Mar 2025	ITF Le Havre, France	W15	Clay (i)	(Belgium) Amélie van Impe	Kristina Kroitor; Anastasia Zolotareva	4–6, 4–6
Loss	2–2	Apr 2025	ITF Antalya, Turkiye	W15	Clay	(Belgium) Amélie van Impe	(Spain) Sara Dols (Japan) Yuki Naito	walkover
Loss	2–3	Aug 2025	ITF Wanfercée-Baulet, Belgium	W15	Clay	(Belgium) Amélie van Impe	(Belgium) Polina Bakhmutkina (Germany) Anna Petkovic	4–6, 1–6
Win	3–3	Aug 2025	ITF Kaltenkirchen, Germany	W15	Clay	(Belgium) Tamila Gadamauri	(Germany) Anna Petkovic; Anastasia Pribylova	7–6^{(5)}, 4–6, [10–7]
Win	4–3	Sep 2025	ITF Kayseri, Turkiye	W15	Hard	(United States) Savannah Broadus	(United Kingdom) Esther Adeshina (Australia) Tenika McGiffin	6–4, 4–6, [12–10]
Win	5–3	Apr 2026	ITF Monastir, Tunisia	W15	Hard	(Netherlands) Sarah van Emst	(United Kingdom) Esther Adeshina (Switzerland) Chelsea Fontenel	6–2, 6–2
Win	6–3	Apr 2026	ITF Oegstgeest, Netherlands	W15	Clay	(Mexico) Fernanda Navarro	(Sweden) Ida Johansson (Poland) Marcelina Podlińska	6–4, 6–7^{(1)}, [12–10]
Loss	6–4	May 2026	ITF Kuršumlijska Banja, Serbia	W15	Clay	(Ukraine) Anastasiya Zaparyniuk	(Switzerland) Marie Mettraux (China) Jialin Tian	5–7, 1–6
Win	7–4	Jun 2026	ITF Alkmaar, Netherlands	W15	Clay	(Belgium) Amélie van Impe	(Netherlands) Annika Barth (Netherlands) Jinte Eve de Boer	6–0, 6–4
Win	8–4	Aug 2026	ITF Koksijde, Belgium	W75	Clay	(Netherlands) Loes Ebeling Koning	(United States) Julia Adams (Netherlands) Merel Hoedt	7–5, 3–6, [10–5]
Loss	8–5	Aug 2026	ITF Haren, Netherlands	W15	Clay	(United States) Mia Horvit	(Netherlands) Annika Barth (Netherlands) Jade Groen	1–6, 6–4, [6–10]
Loss	8–6	Sep 2026	ITF Reims, France	W35	Hard (i)	(Netherlands) Lian Tran	(South Korea) Im Hee-rae (South Korea) Kim Eun-chae	4–6, 4–6
