= Julia Adams (tennis) =

American tennis player

- Country (sports): United States
- Born: September 23, 2001 (age 25)
- Height: 5 ft 10 in (178 cm)
- Turned pro: 2023
- Plays: Right-handed
- College: Furman University; University of Virginia
- Prize money: $58,793

Singles
- Career record: 147–92
- Career titles: 2 ITF
- Highest ranking: No. 418 (November 10, 2025)
- Current ranking: No. 419 (September 21, 2026)

Doubles
- Career record: 109–58
- Career titles: 12 ITF
- Highest ranking: No. 238 (September 21, 2026)
- Current ranking: No. 238 (September 21, 2026)
- Last updated on: September 25, 2026.

Julia Adams (born September 23, 2001) is an American tennis player. She has a career-high singles ranking of world No. 418 reached in November 2025, and a career-high doubles ranking of No. 238, achieved on September 21, 2026.

== History ==
Adams is the daughter of Charles and Ulyana Adams. Her hometown is Knoxville, Tennessee, where she attended Bearden High School. In 2022, she obtained a Bachelor's Degree in Politics and International Affairs from Furman University.

== Professional ==
Adams first appeared on the ITF Women's Circuit in April 2023, as a wildcard doubles entry in the Charlottesville Open. She has won three doubles titles at the W50 event in Bujumbura, Burundi. Altogether, Adams has won two singles titles and 12 doubles titles on the ITF Women's Circuit.

== ITF Circuit finals ==
Legend
W75 tournaments
W50 tournaments
W35 tournaments
W15 tournaments

=== Singles: 7 (2 titles, 5 runner-ups) ===
Result	W–L	Date	Tournament	Tier	Surface	Opponent	Score
Loss	0–1	Mar 2025	ITF Monastir, Tunisia	W15	Hard	(Spain) Eva Guerrero Álvarez	6–7^{(8)}, 0–6
Loss	0–2	Mar 2025	ITF Monastir, Tunisia	W15	Hard	(United States) Eryn Cayetano	3–6, 3–6
Win	1–2	Sep 2025	ITF Kayseri, Turkey	W15	Hard	(Estonia) Elena Malõgina	3–6, 7–6^{(2)}, 7–5
Loss	1–3	Sep 2025	ITF Kayseri, Turkey	W15	Hard	(Germany) Ann Akasha Ceuca	4–6, 2–6
Win	2–3	Sep 2025	ITF Kayseri, Turkey	W15	Hard	Alisa Vasileva	6–0, 7–5
Loss	2–4	Jun 2026	ITF Kayseri, Turkey	W15	Hard	(Serbia) Darja Suvirdjonkova	5–7, 5–7
Loss	2–5	Sep 2026	ITF Radom, Poland	W15	Clay	(Czech Republic) Lucie Petruzelová	6–3, 3–6, 4–6

=== Doubles: 21 (12 titles, 9 runner-ups) ===
Result	W–L	Date	Tournament	Tier	Surface	Partnering	Opponents	Score
Win	1–0	Jun 2024	ITF Monastir, Tunisia	W15	Hard	(Canada) Leena Bennetto	(Egypt) Lamis Abdel Aziz (Egypt) Merna Refaat	4–6, 7–6, [10–4]
Win	2–0	Oct 2024	ITF Monastir, Tunisia	W15	Hard	(United States) Marcella Cruz	(Switzerland) Nadine Keller (Austria) Arabella Koller	6–3, 6–3
Win	3–0	Oct 2024	ITF Monastir, Tunisia	W15	Hard	(United Kingdom) Esther Adeshina	(Germany) Luisa Meyer auf der Heide (Germany) Anja Wildgruber	6–0, 7–5
Loss	3–1	Nov 2024	ITF Monastir, Tunisia	W15	Hard	(United Kingdom) Esther Adeshina	(Germany) Mia Mack (Germany) Marie Vogt	5–7, 4–6
Win	4–1	Nov 2024	ITF Monastir, Tunisia	W15	Hard	(Belgium) Vicky Van de Peer	(Switzerland) Sebastianna Scilipoti (Belgium) Eliessa Vanlangendonck	6–4, 6–2
Loss	4–2	Feb 2025	ITF Monastir, Tunisia	W15	Hard	(United States) Lilian Poling	(Italy) Silvia Ambrosio (Germany) Katharina Hobgarski	4–6, 7–6^{(4)}, [4–10]
Loss	4–3	Mar 2025	ITF Monastir, Tunisia	W15	Hard	(United Kingdom) Esther Adeshina	(United States) Eryn Cayetano (Czech Republic) Emma Slavíková	5–7, 6–3, [4–10]
Win	5–3	Mar 2025	ITF Bujumbura, Burundi	W50	Clay	Anna Ureke	(France) Émeline Dartron (France) Tiantsoa Rakotomanga Rajaonah	6–1, 6–2
Loss	5–4	Jun 2025	ITF Banja Luka, Bosnia and Herzegovina	W15	Clay	(United States) Lilian Poling	(Czech Republic) Amelie Justine Hejtmanek (Germany) Eva Marie Voracek	6–7^{(8)}, 3–6
Loss	5–5	Jun 2025	ITF Monastir, Tunisia	W15	Hard	(Lithuania) Andrė Lukošiūtė	(Spain) Claudia Ferrer Pérez (Hong Kong) Adithya Karunaratne	6–7^{(5)}, 1–6
Win	6–5	Jun 2025	ITF Monastir, Tunisia	W15	Hard	(Tunisia) Mouna Bouzgarrou	(Argentina) Gala Arangio (New Zealand) Elyse Tse	6–2, 6–2
Win	7–5	Sep 2025	ITF Kayseri, Turkey	W15	Hard	(United States) Shria Atturu	(Turkey) Selina Atay (Germany) Ann Akasha Ceuca	7–6^{(3)}, 6–3
Win	8–5	Feb 2026	ITF Monastir, Tunisia	W15	Hard	(China) Zhu Chenting	(Hong Kong) Lai Ching-laam (South Korea) Lee Hyun-yee	6–2, 6–3
Loss	8–6	Mar 2026	ITF Monastir, Tunisia	W15	Hard	(Ukraine) Daria Yesypchuk	Yuliya Hatouka; Milana Zhabrailova	2–6, 4–6
Win	9–6	Apr 2026	ITF Bujumbura, Burundi	W50	Clay	(Netherlands) Merel Hoedt	(France) Nahia Berecoechea (United Kingdom) Ranah Stoiber	6–4, 7–5
Win	10–6	Apr 2026	ITF Bujumbura, Burundi	W50	Clay	(Netherlands) Merel Hoedt	(India) Vaidehi Chaudhari (Netherlands) Jasmijn Gimbrère	4–6, 7–5, [10–5]
Win	11–6	Jun 2026	ITF Kayseri, Turkey	W15	Hard	(United States) Allison Nicole Isaacs	(Turkey) Semra Aksu (Turkey) Simay Keles	7–5, 6–4
Win	12–6	Jul 2026	ITF Knokke-Heist, Belgium	W50	Clay	(Netherlands) Merel Hoedt	(Poland) Daria Kuczer (Egypt) Sandra Samir	7–6^{(7–5)}, 6–2
Loss	12–7	Aug 2026	ITF Koksijde, Belgium	W75	Clay	(Netherlands) Merel Hoedt	(Belgium) Kaat Coppez (Netherlands) Loes Ebeling Koning	5–7, 6–3, [5–10]
Loss	12–8	Sep 2026	Pazardzhik Cup, Bulgaria	W50	Clay	(Netherlands) Merel Hoedt	(Romania) Oana Gavrilă (Greece) Sapfo Sakellaridi	4–6, 4–6
Loss	12–9	Nov 2026	ITF Orlando, United States	W35	Hard	(Romania) Briana Szabó	(United States) Annika Penickova (United States) Kristina Penickova	4–6, 1–6
