= Sofía Cabezas Domínguez =

Venezuelan tennis player (born 2002)

- Full name: Sofía Elena Cabezas Domínguez
- Country (sports): Venezuela
- Born: 6 February 2002 (age 24) Caracas, Venezuela
- Plays: Right (two-handed backhand)
- Prize money: $43,615

Singles
- Career record: 74–51
- Career titles: 0 WTA, 1 ITF
- Highest ranking: No. 448 (21 September 2026)
- Current ranking: No. 571 (16 November 2026)

Doubles
- Career record: 64–33
- Career titles: 7 ITF
- Highest ranking: No. 237 (2 November 2026)
- Current ranking: No. 247 (16 November 2026)

Team competitions
- Fed Cup: 9–6
- Last updated on: 19 November 2026.

Sofía Elena Cabezas Domínguez (born 6 February 2002) is a Venezuelan tennis player. She has a career-high doubles ranking by the WTA of No. 237, achieved on 2 November 2026.

Cabezas played for the Iowa State Cyclones women's tennis team at Iowa State University from 2020 to 2023 and for the Tennessee Volunteers team at the University of Tennessee from 2023 to 2024.

== Career ==
In March 2026, she won the first doubles title of her career at the W15 event in Huamantla, Mexico defeating Mexican player Lya Fernández and Sarah Victoria Nita from Curacao. A week later, she secured her second doubles title with her Mexican partner, Jéssica Hinojosa Gómez, at the Huamantla W35 event.

In March 2026, she and Argentine player Jazmín Ortenzi won the women's doubles final at the W50 event in Chihuahua defeating Mexican duo Victoria Rodríguez and Ana Sofía Sánchez. This championship is her first bigger title.

In August 2026, she won the doubles title at the W35 event in Barueri, Brazil.

In September 2026, she won the doubles title with Mexican player María Fernanda Navarro Oliva at the W15 events held in Luján and in Pilar ın Argentina a week later.

In September 2026, Cabezas Domínguez made her main-draw debut on the WTA Tour in the doubles event of the Guadalajara Open, partnering with Marian Gómez Pezuela Cano.

== ITF Circuit finals ==
=== Singles: 3 (1 title, 2 runner-ups) ===
| Legend W35 tournaments W15 tournaments | Finals by surface Hard (0–2) Clay (1–0) |

| Result | W–L | Date | Tournament | Tier | Surface | Opponent | Score |
|---|---|---|---|---|---|---|---|
| Loss | 0–1 | Sep 2024 | ITF Monastir, Tunisia | W15 | Hard | (Belgium) Eliessa Vanlangendonck | 3–6, 1–6 |
| Loss | 0–2 | Sep 2024 | ITF Monastir, Tunisia | W15 | Hard | (Italy) Camilla Zanolini | 2–6, 1–6 |
| Win | 1–2 | Sep 2026 | ITF Pilar, Argentina | W15 | Clay | (Argentina) Lourdes Ayala | 6–0, 6–4 |

=== Doubles: 12 (7 titles, 5 runner-ups) ===
| Legend W50 tournaments W35 tournaments W15 tournaments | Finals by surface Hard (4–3) Clay (3–2) |

| Result | W–L | Date | Tournament | Tier | Surface | Partner | Opponents | Score |
|---|---|---|---|---|---|---|---|---|
| Loss | 0–1 | Jun 2025 | ITF Santo Domingo, Dominican; Republic | W35 | Hard | (United Kingdom) Esther Adeshina | (Japan) Hiroko Kuwata (India) Sahaja Yamalapalli | 3–6, 2–6 |
| Loss | 0–2 | Jun 2025 | ITF Santo Domingo, Dom. Rep. | W35 | Hard | (United Kingdom) Esther Adeshina | (Brazil) Júlia Camargo Silva (Argentina) Candela Vázquez | 6–7^{(3)}, 6–3, [8–10] |
| Loss | 0–3 | Jul 2025 | ITF Florence, United States | W35 | Hard | (United States) Kylie Collins | (United States) Haley Giavara (Japan) Hiroko Kuwata | 0–6, 4–6 |
| Win | 1–3 | Mar 2026 | ITF Huamantla, Mexico | W15 | Hard | (Italy) Miriana Tona | (Mexico) Lya Fernández (Curaçao) Sarah Victoria Nita | 6–3, 6–3 |
| Win | 2–3 | Mar 2026 | ITF Huamantla, Mexico | W35 | Hard | (Mexico) Jéssica Hinojosa Gómez | (Mexico) Ingrid Millan Acosta (Mexico) Paulina Montiel | 6–1, 7–6^{(5)} |
| Win | 3–3 | Mar 2026 | ITF Chihuahua, Mexico | W50 | Clay | (Argentina) Jazmín Ortenzi | (Mexico) Victoria Rodríguez (Mexico) Ana Sofía Sánchez | 7–5, 6–0 |
| Loss | 3–4 | Apr 2026 | ITF Boca Raton, United States | W35 | Clay | (United States) Anna Rogers | (United States) Savannah Broadus (United States) Abigail Rencheli | 4–6, 6–3, [3–10] |
| Loss | 3–5 | Apr 2026 | ITF Charlotte, United States | W35 | Clay | (Netherlands) Eva Vedder | (Brazil) Luiza Fullana (Brazil) Thaísa Grana Pedretti | 4–6, 2–6 |
| Win | 4–5 | Aug 2026 | ITF Barueri, Brazil | W35 | Hard | (Brazil) Ana Candiotto | (Mexico) Fernanda Navarro (Ecuador) Camila Romero | 6–4, 6–2 |
| Win | 5–5 | Aug 2026 | ITF Luján, Argentina | W15 | Clay | (Mexico) Fernanda Navarro | (Argentina) Luciana Moyano (Ecuador) Camila Romero | 6–2, 3–6, [10–5] |
| Win | 6–5 | Sep 2026 | ITF Pilar, Argentina | W15 | Clay | (Mexico) Fernanda Navarro | (Argentina) Luciana Moyano (Ecuador) Camila Romero | 6–3, 6–3 |
| Win | 7–5 | Sep 2026 | Berkeley Club Challenge, US | W50 | Hard | (United States) Katherine Hui | (Japan) Reina Goto; Evialina Laskevich | 3–6, 6–4, [10–7] |
