= 2026 ITF Women's World Tennis Tour (July–September) =

The 2026 Women's World Tennis Tour is the 2026 edition of the second-tier tour for women's professional tennis. It is organised by World Tennis (formerly the International Tennis Federation) and is a tier below the WTA Tour. The Women's World Tennis Tour includes tournaments in five categories with prize money ranging from $15,000 up to $100,000.

== Key ==
Category
W100 tournaments ($100,000)
W75 tournaments ($60,000)
W50 tournaments ($40,000)
W35 tournaments ($30,000)
W15 tournaments ($15,000)

=== July ===
Week of	Tournament	Winner	Runners-up	Semifinalists	Quarterfinalists
July 6	SanLucar Ladies Open; Aschaffenburg, Germany; Clay; W100; Singles – Doubles	(Georgia (country)) Ekaterine Gorgodze; 6–0, 1–0 ret.	(Ukraine) Anastasiia Sobolieva	Julia Avdeeva (Serbia) Teodora Kostović	(Slovenia) Dalila Jakupović (Turkey) Berfu Cengiz (Argentina) Julia Riera (Slovenia) Tamara Zidanšek
July 6	SanLucar Ladies Open; Aschaffenburg, Germany; Clay; W100; Singles – Doubles	(United States) Rasheeda McAdoo (Kenya) Angella Okutoyi; 6–3, 6–3	(Serbia) Elena Milovanović (Slovenia) Kristina Novak	Julia Avdeeva (Serbia) Teodora Kostović	(Slovenia) Dalila Jakupović (Turkey) Berfu Cengiz (Argentina) Julia Riera (Slovenia) Tamara Zidanšek
July 6	ITF The Hague; The Hague, Netherlands; Clay; W75; Singles and doubles draws	(Netherlands) Eva Vedder; 6–4, 6–3	(Croatia) Lea Bošković	(Czech Republic) Alena Kovačková (Bulgaria) Lia Karatancheva	(Germany) Joëlle Steur (Poland) Gina Feistel (France) Jenny Lim (Netherlands) Arantxa Rus
July 6	ITF The Hague; The Hague, Netherlands; Clay; W75; Singles and doubles draws	(Netherlands) Britt du Pree (Netherlands) Sarah van Emst; 7–5, 6–3	(Italy) Nuria Brancaccio (Italy) Federica Urgesi	(Czech Republic) Alena Kovačková (Bulgaria) Lia Karatancheva	(Germany) Joëlle Steur (Poland) Gina Feistel (France) Jenny Lim (Netherlands) Arantxa Rus
July 6	Corroios, Portugal; Hard; W50; Singles and doubles draws	(United States) Carol Young Suh Lee; 1–6, 6–1, 6–2	(China) Gao Xinyu	(Portugal) Francisca Jorge (China) Shi Han	(Finland) Anastasia Kulikova (Portugal) Angelina Voloshchuk (Switzerland) Susan Bandecchi (Belgium) Hanne Vandewinkel
July 6	Corroios, Portugal; Hard; W50; Singles and doubles draws	(Lithuania) Andrė Lukošiūtė (New Zealand) Elyse Tse; 6–2, 7–5	(Portugal) María García (Portugal) Milana Ivantsiv	(Portugal) Francisca Jorge (China) Shi Han	(Finland) Anastasia Kulikova (Portugal) Angelina Voloshchuk (Switzerland) Susan Bandecchi (Belgium) Hanne Vandewinkel
July 6	Columbus, United States; Hard (i); W50; Singles and doubles draws	(United States) Julieta Pareja; 6–3, 6–3	(Japan) Sakura Hosogi	(United States) Sara Daavettila (Canada) Rebecca Marino	(Canada) Ana Grubor (United States) Malaika Rapolu (United States) Luciana Perry (Japan) Haruka Kaji
July 6	Columbus, United States; Hard (i); W50; Singles and doubles draws	(United States) Ayana Akli (Morocco) Diae El Jardi; 6–3, 1–6, [10–7]	(United States) Ava Hrastar (United States) Victoria Mulville	(United States) Sara Daavettila (Canada) Rebecca Marino	(Canada) Ana Grubor (United States) Malaika Rapolu (United States) Luciana Perry (Japan) Haruka Kaji
July 6	Don Benito, Spain; Carpet; W35; Singles and doubles draws	(Switzerland) Valentina Ryser; 6–4, 6–4	(Slovakia) Viktória Hrunčáková	(Poland) Martyna Kubka (Australia) Melisa Ercan	(Italy) Anastasia Bertacchi (United Kingdom) Victoria Allen (Slovenia) Ela Plošnik (Poland) Zuzanna Pawlikowska
July 6	Don Benito, Spain; Carpet; W35; Singles and doubles draws	(United Kingdom) Victoria Allen (France) Nahia Berecoechea; 6–4, 6–2	(France) Tiphanie Lemaître (Netherlands) Demi Tran	(Poland) Martyna Kubka (Australia) Melisa Ercan	(Italy) Anastasia Bertacchi (United Kingdom) Victoria Allen (Slovenia) Ela Plošnik (Poland) Zuzanna Pawlikowska
July 6	Buzău, Romania; Clay; W35; Singles and doubles draws	(Bulgaria) Rositsa Dencheva; 6–0, 6–3	(Czech Republic) Julie Štruplová	Maria Golovina (Italy) Francesca Gandolfi	Ekaterina Kazionova (Argentina) Victoria Bosio (Germany) Carolina Kuhl (Slovenia) Pia Lovrič
July 6	Buzău, Romania; Clay; W35; Singles and doubles draws	(Romania) Alesia Breaz (Romania) Cristiana Nicoleta Todoni; 1–6, 7–5, [10–1]	(Egypt) Lamis Alhussein Abdel Aziz (Bulgaria) Iva Ivanova	Maria Golovina (Italy) Francesca Gandolfi	Ekaterina Kazionova (Argentina) Victoria Bosio (Germany) Carolina Kuhl (Slovenia) Pia Lovrič
July 6	Hillcrest, South Africa; Hard; W35; Singles and doubles draws	Polina Leykina; 6–4, 6–2	(Egypt) Jana Hossam Salah	Ksenia Smirnova (France) Astrid Cirotte	(South Africa) Isabella Kruger (Switzerland) Jenny Dürst (South Africa) Jahnie van Zyl (Greece) Valentini Grammatikopoulou
July 6	Hillcrest, South Africa; Hard; W35; Singles and doubles draws	(France) Astrid Cirotte (Switzerland) Jenny Dürst; 4–6, 6–2, [10–7]	Polina Leykina; Ksenia Smirnova	Ksenia Smirnova (France) Astrid Cirotte	(South Africa) Isabella Kruger (Switzerland) Jenny Dürst (South Africa) Jahnie van Zyl (Greece) Valentini Grammatikopoulou
July 6	Lu'an, China; Hard; W15; Singles and doubles draws	Alina Tikhonova; 7–5, 6–3	(Hong Kong) Shek Cheuk-ying	Maria Kalyakina (Japan) Ikumi Yamazaki	(China) Sun Yingqun (Malaysia) Shihomi Leong (China) Nong Xinyi (Thailand) Thasaporn Naklo
July 6	Lu'an, China; Hard; W15; Singles and doubles draws	(South Korea) Choi On-yu (South Korea) Lee Ha-eum; 6–3, 6–0	(Singapore) Eva Marie Desvignes (Thailand) Bunyawi Thamchaiwat	Maria Kalyakina (Japan) Ikumi Yamazaki	(China) Sun Yingqun (Malaysia) Shihomi Leong (China) Nong Xinyi (Thailand) Thasaporn Naklo
July 6	Astana, Kazakhstan; Hard; W15; Singles and doubles draws	Ekaterina Maklakova; 6–0, 6–1	(Kazakhstan) Aruzhan Sagandykova	(Thailand) Kamonwan Yodpetch; Maria Sholokhova	(Kazakhstan) Ingkar Dyussebay (South Korea) Jang Ga-eul; Ekaterina Tupitsyna; Kristina Kroitor
July 6	Astana, Kazakhstan; Hard; W15; Singles and doubles draws	(South Korea) Jang Ga-eul; Maria Sholokhova; 6–4, 6–2	(Kazakhstan) Asylzhan Arystanbekova (Kazakhstan) Ingkar Dyussebay	(Thailand) Kamonwan Yodpetch; Maria Sholokhova	(Kazakhstan) Ingkar Dyussebay (South Korea) Jang Ga-eul; Ekaterina Tupitsyna; Kristina Kroitor
July 6	Kuršumlijska Banja, Serbia; Clay; W15; Singles and doubles draws	(Hong Kong) Adithya Karunaratne; 6–2, 2–6, 6–0	(Latvia) Elza Tomase	(Serbia) Anja Stanković (Slovakia) Kali Šupová	(France) Eleejah Inisan (Germany) Leticia Solakov (Croatia) Dora Mišković (China) Tian Jialin
July 6	Kuršumlijska Banja, Serbia; Clay; W15; Singles and doubles draws	(Bosnia and Herzegovina) Tea Kovačević (Serbia) Anja Stanković; 6–2, 6–2	(China) Tian Jialin (Croatia) Dora Mišković	(Serbia) Anja Stanković (Slovakia) Kali Šupová	(France) Eleejah Inisan (Germany) Leticia Solakov (Croatia) Dora Mišković (China) Tian Jialin
July 6	Monastir, Tunisia; Hard; W15; Singles and doubles draws	Yuliya Perapekhina; 6–4, 7–6^{(7–4)}	(United States) Sofia Rojas	(Switzerland) Chelsea Fontenel (Norway) Katja Wiersholm	(Egypt) Aya El Sayed (Germany) Karla Bartel (Egypt) Yasmin Ezzat (Egypt) Nada Fouad
July 6	Monastir, Tunisia; Hard; W15; Singles and doubles draws	(Egypt) Yasmin Ezzat (Italy) Matilde Mariani; 6–3, 6–2	Stefaniya Neporent; Yuliya Perapekhina	(Switzerland) Chelsea Fontenel (Norway) Katja Wiersholm	(Egypt) Aya El Sayed (Germany) Karla Bartel (Egypt) Yasmin Ezzat (Egypt) Nada Fouad
July 6	Rancho Santa Fe, United States; Hard; W15; Singles and doubles draws	Veronika Miroshnichenko; 6–3, 6–4	Alina Shcherbinina	(United States) Misa Malkin (United States) Jo-yee Chan	(United States) Alexis Nguyen (Benin) Gloriana Nahum (United States) Alyssa Ahn (United States) Kate Fakih
July 6	Rancho Santa Fe, United States; Hard; W15; Singles and doubles draws	Veronika Miroshnichenko (Ukraine) Anita Sahdiieva; 6–4, 6–3	(United States) Jessica Bernales (United States) Sophia Webster	(United States) Misa Malkin (United States) Jo-yee Chan	(United States) Alexis Nguyen (Benin) Gloriana Nahum (United States) Alyssa Ahn (United States) Kate Fakih
July 6	Rio Claro, Brazil; Clay; W15; Singles and doubles draws	(France) Océane Babel; 3–6, 6–4, 6–1	(Brazil) Marjorie Souza	(Brazil) Luiza Fullana (Chile) Jimar Gerald González	(United States) Isabella Barrera Aguirre (Brazil) Carolina Bohrer Martins (Colombia) María Herazo (Brazil) Ana Candiotto
July 6	Rio Claro, Brazil; Clay; W15; Singles and doubles draws	(Brazil) Ana Candiotto (Brazil) Luiza Fullana; 6–4, 7–6^{(7–5)}	(Brazil) Júlia Konishi Camargo Silva (Brazil) Rebeca Pereira	(Brazil) Luiza Fullana (Chile) Jimar Gerald González	(United States) Isabella Barrera Aguirre (Brazil) Carolina Bohrer Martins (Colombia) María Herazo (Brazil) Ana Candiotto
July 13	Open Araba en Femenino; Vitoria-Gasteiz, Spain; Hard; W75; Singles – Doubles	(Poland) Martyna Kubka; 5–7, 6–3, 6–3	(Lithuania) Justina Mikulskytė	Kira Pavlova; Valeria Savinykh	(China) Shi Han (Slovakia) Katarína Kužmová (Spain) Maria Martínez Vaquero; Maria Golovina
July 13	Open Araba en Femenino; Vitoria-Gasteiz, Spain; Hard; W75; Singles – Doubles	(Spain) Celia Cerviño Ruiz (Spain) Alba Rey García; 6–4, 7–6^{(8–6)}	(Spain) Carmen Gallardo Guevara (Spain) Eugenia Zozaya Menéndez	Kira Pavlova; Valeria Savinykh	(China) Shi Han (Slovakia) Katarína Kužmová (Spain) Maria Martínez Vaquero; Maria Golovina
July 13	ITS Cup; Olomouc, Czech Republic; Clay; W75; Singles and doubles draws	(Czech Republic) Julie Štruplová; 6–3, 6–4	(Slovakia) Radka Zelníčková	(Czech Republic) Petra Sedláčková (Czech Republic) Aneta Kučmová	(Spain) Ángela Fita Boluda (Italy) Isabella Maria Șerban (Germany) Carolina Kuhl (Czech Republic) Anna Sisková
July 13	ITS Cup; Olomouc, Czech Republic; Clay; W75; Singles and doubles draws	(Hungary) Adrienn Nagy (Czech Republic) Ivana Šebestová; 3–6, 7–6^{(8–6)}, [10–5]	(Finland) Laura Hietaranta (Slovakia) Nina Vargová	(Czech Republic) Petra Sedláčková (Czech Republic) Aneta Kučmová	(Spain) Ángela Fita Boluda (Italy) Isabella Maria Șerban (Germany) Carolina Kuhl (Czech Republic) Anna Sisková
July 13	Championnats de Granby; Granby, Canada; Hard; W75; Singles and doubles draws	(Canada) Kayla Cross; 7–5, 6–1	(Japan) Sara Saito	(United States) Elizabeth Mandlik (Japan) Sakura Hosogi	(United States) Lea Ma (Canada) Rebecca Marino (Canada) Cadence Brace (Japan) Ena Koike
July 13	Championnats de Granby; Granby, Canada; Hard; W75; Singles and doubles draws	(United States) Kylie Collins (United States) Olivia Lincer; 6–2, 6–2	(Canada) Mia Kupres (Canada) Alexandra Vagramov	(United States) Elizabeth Mandlik (Japan) Sakura Hosogi	(United States) Lea Ma (Canada) Rebecca Marino (Canada) Cadence Brace (Japan) Ena Koike
July 13	Nottingham, United Kingdom; Hard; W50; Singles and doubles draws	(United Kingdom) Alicia Dudeney; 6–3, 7–6^{(7–5)}	(United Kingdom) Naiktha Bains	(United Kingdom) Hannah Klugman (France) Océane Dodin	(United Kingdom) Victoria Allen (France) Manon Léonard (Norway) Katja Wiersholm (United Kingdom) Emily Appleton
July 13	Nottingham, United Kingdom; Hard; W50; Singles and doubles draws	(United Kingdom) Brooke Black (Kenya) Angella Okutoyi; Walkover	(United Kingdom) Victoria Allen (United Kingdom) Amelia Rajecki	(United Kingdom) Hannah Klugman (France) Océane Dodin	(United Kingdom) Victoria Allen (France) Manon Léonard (Norway) Katja Wiersholm (United Kingdom) Emily Appleton
July 13	Darmstadt, Germany; Hard; W50; Singles and doubles draws	(Germany) Nastasja Schunk; 5–7, 6–0, 7–6^{(20–18)}	(Spain) Irene Burillo	(Malta) Francesca Curmi (Germany) Tessa Brockmann	(France) Séléna Janicijevic (China) Yao Xinxin (Germany) Victoria Brand (Spain) Alicia Herrero Liñana
July 13	Darmstadt, Germany; Hard; W50; Singles and doubles draws	(Australia) Gabriella Da Silva-Fick (Australia) Tenika McGiffin; 7–5, 7–6^{(7–4)}	(Egypt) Sandra Samir (Germany) Joëlle Steur	(Malta) Francesca Curmi (Germany) Tessa Brockmann	(France) Séléna Janicijevic (China) Yao Xinxin (Germany) Victoria Brand (Spain) Alicia Herrero Liñana
July 13	Turin, Italy; Clay; W35; Singles and doubles draws	(Netherlands) Antonia Stoyanov; 6–1, 6–2	(Italy) Beatrice Ricci	(Brazil) Gabriela Cé (Switzerland) Katerina Tsygourova	(Serbia) Luna Vujović (France) Astrid Lew Yan Foon (Spain) Carlota Martínez Círez (Bulgaria) Lia Karatancheva
July 13	Turin, Italy; Clay; W35; Singles and doubles draws	(Italy) Gaia Maduzzi (Italy) Vittoria Paganetti; 6–2, 7–5	(Italy) Jessica Bertoldo (Italy) Ginevra Parentini	(Brazil) Gabriela Cé (Switzerland) Katerina Tsygourova	(Serbia) Luna Vujović (France) Astrid Lew Yan Foon (Spain) Carlota Martínez Círez (Bulgaria) Lia Karatancheva
July 13	Dallas Summer Series; Dallas, United States; Hard (i); W35; Singles and doubles draws	(United States) Hanna Chang; 2–6, 6–4, 6–4	Alina Shcherbinina	(Peru) Dana Guzmán (United States) Lexington Reed	(China) Ma Yexin; Ekaterina Khayrutdinova (United States) Malaika Rapolu (United States) Christasha McNeil
July 13	Dallas Summer Series; Dallas, United States; Hard (i); W35; Singles and doubles draws	(Thailand) Mananchaya Sawangkaew (Hong Kong) Cody Wong; 6–3, 6–1	(United States) Sophie Llewellyn (Ukraine) Anita Sahdiieva	(Peru) Dana Guzmán (United States) Lexington Reed	(China) Ma Yexin; Ekaterina Khayrutdinova (United States) Malaika Rapolu (United States) Christasha McNeil
July 13	São Paulo, Brazil; Clay; W35; Singles and doubles draws	(France) Océane Babel; 6–3, 6–4	(Ecuador) Mell Reasco	(Peru) Lucciana Pérez Alarcón; Daria Egorova	(Argentina) Martina Capurro Taborda (Argentina) Justina María González Daniele (Italy) Giorgia Pedone (Mexico) Ana Sofía Sánchez
July 13	São Paulo, Brazil; Clay; W35; Singles and doubles draws	Daria Egorova (Mexico) Marian Gómez Pezuela Cano; 6–2, 6–4	(Italy) Giorgia Pedone (Mexico) Ana Sofía Sánchez	(Peru) Lucciana Pérez Alarcón; Daria Egorova	(Argentina) Martina Capurro Taborda (Argentina) Justina María González Daniele (Italy) Giorgia Pedone (Mexico) Ana Sofía Sánchez
July 13	Brisbane, Australia; Hard; W15; Singles and doubles draws	(New Zealand) Destanee Aiava; 6–2, 6–3	(Australia) Belle Thompson	(Japan) Natsuki Yoshimoto (Chinese Taipei) Yang Ya-yi	(Australia) Alana Subasic (Australia) Lily Taylor (Australia) Tori Russell (Australia) Stefani Webb
July 13	Brisbane, Australia; Hard; W15; Singles and doubles draws	(Australia) Lily Fairclough (Australia) Roisin Gilheany; 7–6^{(7–2)}, 7–5	(Chinese Taipei) Lin Fang-an (Chinese Taipei) Yang Ya-yi	(Japan) Natsuki Yoshimoto (Chinese Taipei) Yang Ya-yi	(Australia) Alana Subasic (Australia) Lily Taylor (Australia) Tori Russell (Australia) Stefani Webb
July 13	Lu'an, China; Hard; W15; Singles and doubles draws	Alina Tikhonova; 7–6^{(7–5)}, 6–3	(China) Wang Jiayi	(Japan) Naho Sato; Maria Kalyakina	(South Korea) Choi Seo-yun; Anastasiia Gureva; Alexandra Malova (China) Zhang Junhan
July 13	Lu'an, China; Hard; W15; Singles and doubles draws	(Malaysia) Shihomi Leong (Thailand) Salakthip Ounmuang; 6–2, 6–1	(Japan) Riko Kikawada (Japan) Rira Kosaka	(Japan) Naho Sato; Maria Kalyakina	(South Korea) Choi Seo-yun; Anastasiia Gureva; Alexandra Malova (China) Zhang Junhan
July 13	Astana, Kazakhstan; Hard; W15; Singles and doubles draws	(Thailand) Kamonwan Yodpetch; 6–7^{(6–8)}, 6–4, 7–5	Ekaterina Tupitsyna	Maria Sholokhova (South Korea) Jang Ga-eul	Victoria Milovanova; Ekaterina Maklakova; Kristina Kroitor (Japan) Rinko Matsuda
July 13	Astana, Kazakhstan; Hard; W15; Singles and doubles draws	(Japan) Rinko Matsuda (Japan) Sera Nishimoto; 6–3, 6–1	(Kazakhstan) Asylzhan Arystanbekova (Kazakhstan) Ingkar Dyussebay	Maria Sholokhova (South Korea) Jang Ga-eul	Victoria Milovanova; Ekaterina Maklakova; Kristina Kroitor (Japan) Rinko Matsuda
July 13	Krško, Slovenia; Clay; W15; Singles and doubles draws	(Germany) Marie Vogt; 6–2, 6–4	(Spain) Ruth Roura Llaverías	(Netherlands) Rose Marie Nijkamp (Slovenia) Živa Falkner	(Italy) Federica Trevisan (Hungary) Luca Udvardy (United States) Mia Horvit (Slovenia) Veritsa Yaneva
July 13	Krško, Slovenia; Clay; W15; Singles and doubles draws	(Czech Republic) Veronika Kulhavá (Italy) Federica Trevisan; 6–3, 6–1	(France) Eleejah Inisan (Netherlands) Rose Marie Nijkamp	(Netherlands) Rose Marie Nijkamp (Slovenia) Živa Falkner	(Italy) Federica Trevisan (Hungary) Luca Udvardy (United States) Mia Horvit (Slovenia) Veritsa Yaneva
July 13	Kuršumlijska Banja, Serbia; Clay; W15; Singles and doubles draws	(France) Nina Radovanović; 4–6, 6–1, 6–2	(Serbia) Petra Konjikušić	(Netherlands) Rikke de Koning (Canada) Ellie Daniels	(Spain) Lucia Natal (Germany) Sophie Greiner (Greece) Dimitra Pavlou (Serbia) Jana Bojović
July 13	Kuršumlijska Banja, Serbia; Clay; W15; Singles and doubles draws	(Netherlands) Rikke de Koning (France) Helena Stevic; 7–5, 6–2	(Italy) Aurora Corvi (Italy) Emma Ottavia Ghirardato	(Netherlands) Rikke de Koning (Canada) Ellie Daniels	(Spain) Lucia Natal (Germany) Sophie Greiner (Greece) Dimitra Pavlou (Serbia) Jana Bojović
July 13	Hillcrest, South Africa; Hard; W15; Singles and doubles draws	(France) Astrid Cirotte; 6–1, 7–6^{(7–1)}	(South Africa) Marilouise van Zyl	(South Africa) Jahnie van Zyl (South Africa) Isabella Kruger	(South Africa) Donna Le Roux (Belgium) Valentina Khrebtova; Ksenia Smirnova (Israel) Mika Buchnik
July 13	Hillcrest, South Africa; Hard; W15; Singles and doubles draws	(France) Astrid Cirotte (Switzerland) Jenny Dürst; 6–1, 6–2	(South Africa) Morgan Jordaan (South Africa) Donna Le Roux	(South Africa) Jahnie van Zyl (South Africa) Isabella Kruger	(South Africa) Donna Le Roux (Belgium) Valentina Khrebtova; Ksenia Smirnova (Israel) Mika Buchnik
July 13	Monastir, Tunisia; Hard; W15; Singles and doubles draws	Yuliya Perapekhina; 6–4, 6–2	Ekaterina Dotsenko	(United States) Sofia Rojas (United States) Aspen Schuman	(Switzerland) Chelsea Fontenel (Egypt) Aya El Sayed (United Kingdom) Savannah Dada-Mascoll (United Kingdom) Kristina Paskauskas
July 13	Monastir, Tunisia; Hard; W15; Singles and doubles draws	(United Kingdom) Savannah Dada-Mascoll (Czech Republic) Amélie Šmejkalová; 7–6^{(7–4)}, 5–7, [13–11]	(Egypt) Yasmin Ezzat (France) Marie Villet	(United States) Sofia Rojas (United States) Aspen Schuman	(Switzerland) Chelsea Fontenel (Egypt) Aya El Sayed (United Kingdom) Savannah Dada-Mascoll (United Kingdom) Kristina Paskauskas
July 20	Ladies Open Amstetten; Amstetten, Austria; Clay; W100; Singles and doubles draws	(Serbia) Teodora Kostović; 6–4, 6–0	(United States) Vivian Wolff	(Spain) Alicia Herrero Liñana (Czech Republic) Anna Sisková	(Austria) Julia Grabher (Spain) Ángela Fita Boluda (Ukraine) Anastasiia Sobolieva (Czech Republic) Julie Paštiková
July 20	Ladies Open Amstetten; Amstetten, Austria; Clay; W100; Singles and doubles draws	(Czech Republic) Aneta Kučmová (Czech Republic) Aneta Laboutková; 6–1, 1–6, [16–14]	(Spain) Ángela Fita Boluda (Czech Republic) Anna Sisková	(Spain) Alicia Herrero Liñana (Czech Republic) Anna Sisková	(Austria) Julia Grabher (Spain) Ángela Fita Boluda (Ukraine) Anastasiia Sobolieva (Czech Republic) Julie Paštiková
July 20	The Women's Hospital Classic; Evansville, United States; Hard; W100; Singles and doubles draws	(United States) Caroline Dolehide; 7–6^{(7–3)}, 7–6^{(7–5)}	(South Korea) Ku Yeon-woo	(Mexico) Renata Zarazúa (Italy) Lucrezia Stefanini	(Japan) Yuki Naito (United States) Elvina Kalieva (Thailand) Mananchaya Sawangkaew (United States) Mary Stoiana
July 20	The Women's Hospital Classic; Evansville, United States; Hard; W100; Singles and doubles draws	(Chinese Taipei) Cho I-hsuan (Chinese Taipei) Cho Yi-tsen; 6–2, 6–3	(Canada) Kayla Cross (United States) Anna Rogers	(Mexico) Renata Zarazúa (Italy) Lucrezia Stefanini	(Japan) Yuki Naito (United States) Elvina Kalieva (Thailand) Mananchaya Sawangkaew (United States) Mary Stoiana
July 20	Internazionali di Tennis del Friuli Venezia Giulia; Cordenons, Italy; Clay; W75; Singles and doubles draws	(Serbia) Mia Ristić; 6–3, 6–3	(Italy) Nuria Brancaccio	(Italy) Martina Trevisan (Italy) Viola Turini	(Spain) Carlota Martínez Círez (Malta) Francesca Curmi (Brazil) Gabriela Cé (Latvia) Beatrise Zeltiņa
July 20	Internazionali di Tennis del Friuli Venezia Giulia; Cordenons, Italy; Clay; W75; Singles and doubles draws	(Italy) Gaia Maduzzi (Italy) Vittoria Paganetti; 2–6, 6–4, [10–5]	(Finland) Laura Hietaranta (Latvia) Beatrise Zeltiņa	(Italy) Martina Trevisan (Italy) Viola Turini	(Spain) Carlota Martínez Círez (Malta) Francesca Curmi (Brazil) Gabriela Cé (Latvia) Beatrise Zeltiņa
July 20	Vacaria Open; Vacaria, Brazil; Clay (i); W75; Singles and doubles draws	(Argentina) Julia Riera; 7–5, 6–0	(Peru) Lucciana Pérez Alarcón	(Brazil) Laura Pigossi; Daria Egorova	(Brazil) Naná Silva (Chile) Fernanda Labraña (Brazil) Pietra Rivoli (Argentina) Martina Capurro Taborda
July 20	Vacaria Open; Vacaria, Brazil; Clay (i); W75; Singles and doubles draws	(Brazil) Naná Silva (Brazil) Laura Pigossi; 4–6, 6–2, [10–6]	(United States) Isabella Barrera Aguirre (Brazil) Carolina Bohrer Martins	(Brazil) Laura Pigossi; Daria Egorova	(Brazil) Naná Silva (Chile) Fernanda Labraña (Brazil) Pietra Rivoli (Argentina) Martina Capurro Taborda
July 20	Horb, Germany; Clay; W50; Singles and doubles draws	(Sweden) Lea Nilsson; 7–6^{(7–3)}, 6–2	(South Korea) Back Da-yeon	(Spain) Charo Esquiva Bañuls (Bulgaria) Denislava Glushkova	(Germany) Josy Daems (Germany) Francesca Parcelli (Germany) Lola Giza (Netherlands) Loes Ebeling Koning
July 20	Horb, Germany; Clay; W50; Singles and doubles draws	(France) Lucie Nguyen Tan (Greece) Sapfo Sakellaridi; 6–2, 2–6, [10–7]	(South Korea) Back Da-yeon (South Korea) Park So-hyun	(Spain) Charo Esquiva Bañuls (Bulgaria) Denislava Glushkova	(Germany) Josy Daems (Germany) Francesca Parcelli (Germany) Lola Giza (Netherlands) Loes Ebeling Koning
July 20	Gentofte, Denmark; Clay; W35; Singles and doubles draws	(Spain) Lucía Cortez Llorca; 6–1, 3–6, 6–1	(Sweden) Linea Bajraliu	(France) Astrid Lew Yan Foon (Denmark) Johanne Svendsen	(France) Yara Bartashevich (Sweden) Nellie Taraba Wallberg (Denmark) Rebecca Munk Mortensen (New Zealand) Valentina Ivanov
July 20	Gentofte, Denmark; Clay; W35; Singles and doubles draws	(Denmark) Vilma Krebs Hyllested (Denmark) Rebecca Munk Mortensen; 3–6, 6–1, [10–4]	(Netherlands) Rose Marie Nijkamp (Germany) Marie Vogt	(France) Astrid Lew Yan Foon (Denmark) Johanne Svendsen	(France) Yara Bartashevich (Sweden) Nellie Taraba Wallberg (Denmark) Rebecca Munk Mortensen (New Zealand) Valentina Ivanov
July 20	Saskatoon Challenger; Saskatoon, Canada; Hard; W35; Singles and doubles draws	(Canada) Teah Chavez; 2–6, 6–4, 6–4	(Canada) Ariana Arseneault	(Australia) Lizette Cabrera (China) Lu Jiajing	(Canada) Emma Dong (United States) Alyssa Ahn (Canada) Isabella Marton (Japan) Miho Kuramochi
July 20	Saskatoon Challenger; Saskatoon, Canada; Hard; W35; Singles and doubles draws	(United States) Alyssa Ahn (United States) Kaya Moe; 6–4, 3–6, [10–8]	(Canada) Teah Chavez (Canada) Scarlett Nicholson	(Australia) Lizette Cabrera (China) Lu Jiajing	(Canada) Emma Dong (United States) Alyssa Ahn (Canada) Isabella Marton (Japan) Miho Kuramochi
July 20	Santa Fe, United States; Hard; W35; Singles and doubles draws	(United States) Malaika Rapolu; 6–2, 6–0	(United States) Hina Inoue	(Peru) Dana Guzmán (Portugal) Angelina Voloshchuk	(United States) Kate Fakih (India) Krisha Mahendran (Japan) Mayu Crossley (United States) McKenna Schaefbauer
July 20	Santa Fe, United States; Hard; W35; Singles and doubles draws	(United States) Annika Penickova (United States) Kristina Penickova; 6–3, 6–3	(Spain) Carolina Gómez (Republic of Ireland) Celine Simunyu	(Peru) Dana Guzmán (Portugal) Angelina Voloshchuk	(United States) Kate Fakih (India) Krisha Mahendran (Japan) Mayu Crossley (United States) McKenna Schaefbauer
July 20	Brisbane, Australia; Hard; W15; Singles and doubles draws	(New Zealand) Destanee Aiava; 6–2, 6–1	(Japan) Natsuho Arakawa	(Chinese Taipei) Tsao Chia-yi (Japan) Natsuki Yoshimoto	(Chinese Taipei) Yang Ya-yi (Japan) Maiko Uchijima (Australia) Sarah Mildren (Chinese Taipei) Wan I-wen
July 20	Brisbane, Australia; Hard; W15; Singles and doubles draws	(Japan) Natsuho Arakawa (Japan) Nanari Katsumi; 7–5, 6–3	(Australia) Lily Taylor (Australia) Belle Thompson	(Chinese Taipei) Tsao Chia-yi (Japan) Natsuki Yoshimoto	(Chinese Taipei) Yang Ya-yi (Japan) Maiko Uchijima (Australia) Sarah Mildren (Chinese Taipei) Wan I-wen
July 20	Las Palmas, Spain; Clay; W15; Singles and doubles draws	(Spain) Carmen Gallardo Guevara; 5–7, 6–2, 6–3	(Slovenia) Kristina Novak	(Italy) Noemi Maines (United States) Shannon Lam	(Spain) Lucía Rodríguez; Anna Shkutova (Morocco) Aya El Aouni (France) Emma Léné
July 20	Las Palmas, Spain; Clay; W15; Singles and doubles draws	(Spain) Olga Bienzobas Fernandez (Australia) Naomi McKenzie; 7–5, 5–7, [10–6]	(Italy) Eleonora Alvisi (Italy) Sonia Cassani	(Italy) Noemi Maines (United States) Shannon Lam	(Spain) Lucía Rodríguez; Anna Shkutova (Morocco) Aya El Aouni (France) Emma Léné
July 20	Nogent-sur-Marne, France; Clay; W15; Singles and doubles draws	(Argentina) Agustina Chlpac; 2–6, 6–4, 6–2	(France) Daphnée Mpetshi Perricard	(Switzerland) Marie Mettraux (Ukraine) Kateryna Diatlova	(France) Sarah Iliev (France) Sophia Biolay (France) Kim Chiarello (France) Charlotte Cora-Bruneton
July 20	Nogent-sur-Marne, France; Clay; W15; Singles and doubles draws	(France) Jenny Lim (France) Marie Mattel; 4–6, 6–3, [13–11]	(Italy) Federica Trevisan (Italy) Ylenia Zocco	(Switzerland) Marie Mettraux (Ukraine) Kateryna Diatlova	(France) Sarah Iliev (France) Sophia Biolay (France) Kim Chiarello (France) Charlotte Cora-Bruneton
July 20	Cluj-Napoca, Romania; Clay; W15; Singles and doubles draws	(Romania) Ilinca Amariei; 6–2, 6–2	(Romania) Teodora Miron	(Romania) Sara Victoria Bălan (Romania) Ioana Maria Şandru	(Belgium) Katarina Kujovic (Romania) Georgia Crăciun (Romania) Patricia Georgiana Goina (Argentina) Paula Ormaechea
July 20	Cluj-Napoca, Romania; Clay; W15; Singles and doubles draws	(Romania) Alesia Breaz (Romania) Patricia Georgiana Goina; 6–4, 2–6, [10–8]	(Romania) Alexia Iulia Mărginean (Latvia) Marina Markina	(Romania) Sara Victoria Bălan (Romania) Ioana Maria Şandru	(Belgium) Katarina Kujovic (Romania) Georgia Crăciun (Romania) Patricia Georgiana Goina (Argentina) Paula Ormaechea
July 20	Kuršumlijska Banja, Serbia; Clay; W15; Singles and doubles draws	(Spain) Ariana Geerlings; 6–3, 6–3	(France) Nina Radovanović	(Italy) Federica Sacco (Italy) Emma Ottavia Ghirardato	(Serbia) Natalija Senić (Greece) Marianna Argyrokastriti (Serbia) Gala Ivanović (Netherlands) Rikke de Koning
July 20	Kuršumlijska Banja, Serbia; Clay; W15; Singles and doubles draws	(Serbia) Natalija Senić (Serbia) Anja Stanković; 6–3, 6–3	(Greece) Marianna Argyrokastriti (Czech Republic) Lucie Urbanová	(Italy) Federica Sacco (Italy) Emma Ottavia Ghirardato	(Serbia) Natalija Senić (Greece) Marianna Argyrokastriti (Serbia) Gala Ivanović (Netherlands) Rikke de Koning
July 20	Huamantla, Mexico; Hard; W15; Singles and doubles draws	(Hong Kong) Kallista Liu; 3–6, 6–2, 6–4	(Israel) Mika Buchnik	(Colombia) María José Sánchez Uribe (United States) Misa Malkin	(Mexico) Amanda Nava Elkin (United States) Camille Allegre (Mexico) Fernanda Torres Gómez (United States) Gabriella Price
July 20	Huamantla, Mexico; Hard; W15; Singles and doubles draws	(United States) Camille Allegre (United States) Olivia Allegre; 6–3, 6–3	(United States) Jayna Clemens (Hong Kong) Kallista Liu	(Colombia) María José Sánchez Uribe (United States) Misa Malkin	(Mexico) Amanda Nava Elkin (United States) Camille Allegre (Mexico) Fernanda Torres Gómez (United States) Gabriella Price
July 27	ITF World Tennis Tour Gran Canaria; Maspalomas, Spain; Clay; W100; Singles and doubles draws	(Brazil) Laura Pigossi; 6–7^{(2–7)}, 6–1, 6–3	(Turkey) Berfu Cengiz	(Malta) Francesca Curmi (Czech Republic) Dominika Šalková	(Czech Republic) Anna Sisková (France) Emma Léné (Spain) Andrea Lázaro García (Netherlands) Arantxa Rus
July 27	ITF World Tennis Tour Gran Canaria; Maspalomas, Spain; Clay; W100; Singles and doubles draws	(Kazakhstan) Zhibek Kulambayeva (Czech Republic) Anna Sisková; 6–3, 7–6^{(7–3)}	(Czech Republic) Dominika Šalková (Sweden) Lisa Zaar	(Malta) Francesca Curmi (Czech Republic) Dominika Šalková	(Czech Republic) Anna Sisková (France) Emma Léné (Spain) Andrea Lázaro García (Netherlands) Arantxa Rus
July 27	Ladies Open Hechingen; Hechingen, Germany; Clay; W75; Singles and doubles draws	(Czech Republic) Barbora Palicová; 5–7, 7–5, 6–4	(France) Fiona Ferro	(Italy) Nuria Brancaccio (Germany) Eva Bennemann	(Germany) Nastasja Schunk (Switzerland) Katerina Tsygourova (Croatia) Tena Lukas (Germany) Tessa Brockmann
July 27	Ladies Open Hechingen; Hechingen, Germany; Clay; W75; Singles and doubles draws	(Italy) Enola Chiesa (Slovenia) Dalila Jakupović; 6–3, 2–6, [12–10]	(Greece) Sapfo Sakellaridi (Italy) Aurora Zantedeschi	(Italy) Nuria Brancaccio (Germany) Eva Bennemann	(Germany) Nastasja Schunk (Switzerland) Katerina Tsygourova (Croatia) Tena Lukas (Germany) Tessa Brockmann
July 27	Lexington Challenger; Lexington, United States; Hard; W75; Singles and doubles draws	(Finland) Anastasia Kulikova; 7–5, 6–4	(United States) Ayana Akli	(United States) Kylie Collins (United States) Fiona Crawley	(Japan) Sara Saito (United States) Savannah Broadus (United States) Hanna Chang (South Korea) Lee Eun-hye
July 27	Lexington Challenger; Lexington, United States; Hard; W75; Singles and doubles draws	(United States) Ayana Akli (United States) Fiona Crawley; 2–6, 7–6^{(7–3)}, [12–10]	(United States) Savannah Broadus (United States) Kylie Collins	(United States) Kylie Collins (United States) Fiona Crawley	(Japan) Sara Saito (United States) Savannah Broadus (United States) Hanna Chang (South Korea) Lee Eun-hye
July 27	Dublin, Ireland; Carpet; W50; Singles and doubles draws	(Czech Republic) Vendula Valdmannová; 6–1, 7–6^{(7–4)}	(United Kingdom) Amelia Rajecki	(Switzerland) Valentina Ryser (Slovakia) Viktória Hrunčáková	(United Kingdom) Victoria Allen (France) Chloé Noël (United Kingdom) Esther Adeshina (Netherlands) Britt du Pree
July 27	Dublin, Ireland; Carpet; W50; Singles and doubles draws	(United Kingdom) Ella McDonald (United Kingdom) Amelia Rajecki; 6–2, 6–1	(United Kingdom) Alicia Dudeney (Poland) Zuzanna Pawlikowska	(Switzerland) Valentina Ryser (Slovakia) Viktória Hrunčáková	(United Kingdom) Victoria Allen (France) Chloé Noël (United Kingdom) Esther Adeshina (Netherlands) Britt du Pree
July 27	Knokke-Heist, Belgium; Clay; W50; Singles and doubles draws	(Germany) Jule Niemeier; 6–1, 4–6, 6–1	(Slovakia) Irina Balus	(Netherlands) Sarah van Emst (France) Jenny Lim	(Ukraine) Daria Yesypchuk (Belgium) Margaux Maquet (Greece) Martha Matoula (Italy) Francesca Pace
July 27	Knokke-Heist, Belgium; Clay; W50; Singles and doubles draws	(United States) Julia Adams (Netherlands) Merel Hoedt; 7–6^{(7–5)}, 6–2	(Poland) Daria Kuczer (Egypt) Sandra Samir	(Netherlands) Sarah van Emst (France) Jenny Lim	(Ukraine) Daria Yesypchuk (Belgium) Margaux Maquet (Greece) Martha Matoula (Italy) Francesca Pace
July 27	Aldershot, United Kingdom; Hard; W35; Singles and doubles draws	(Japan) Rina Saigo; 7–5, 2–6, 6–3	(Hong Kong) Adithya Karunaratne	(Poland) Linda Klimovičová (United Kingdom) Naiktha Bains	(India) Vaidehi Chaudhari (Japan) Sayaka Ishii (United Kingdom) Hannah Klugman (United Kingdom) Brooke Black
July 27	Aldershot, United Kingdom; Hard; W35; Singles and doubles draws	(United Kingdom) Savannah Dada-Mascoll (United Kingdom) Kristina Paskauskas; 6–4, 6–3	(United Kingdom) Emily Appleton (Slovakia) Katarína Kužmová	(Poland) Linda Klimovičová (United Kingdom) Naiktha Bains	(India) Vaidehi Chaudhari (Japan) Sayaka Ishii (United Kingdom) Hannah Klugman (United Kingdom) Brooke Black
July 27	Florence, United States; Hard; W35; Singles and doubles draws	(United States) Annika Penickova; 6–3, 6–4	(United States) Piper Charney	(Japan) Mayu Crossley (Portugal) Angelina Voloshchuk	(United States) Alexis Nguyen (United States) Jo-Yee Chan; Ekaterina Khayrutdinova (India) Krisha Mahendran
July 27	Florence, United States; Hard; W35; Singles and doubles draws	(United States) Annika Penickova (United States) Kristina Penickova; 6–3, 6–3	(United States) Alyssa Ahn (India) Krisha Mahendran	(Japan) Mayu Crossley (Portugal) Angelina Voloshchuk	(United States) Alexis Nguyen (United States) Jo-Yee Chan; Ekaterina Khayrutdinova (India) Krisha Mahendran
July 27	Pergamino, Argentina; Clay; W35; Singles and doubles draws	(Brazil) Carolina Alves; 4–6, 6–3, 6–2	(Argentina) Victoria Bosio	Daria Egorova (Italy) Giorgia Pedone	(Ecuador) Camila Romero (Peru) Lucciana Pérez Alarcón (Chile) Fernanda Labraña (Argentina) Francesca Mattioli
July 27	Pergamino, Argentina; Clay; W35; Singles and doubles draws	(Brazil) Rebeca Pereira (Argentina) María Florencia Urrutia; 4–6, 6–1, [10–8]	(Argentina) Luciana Moyano (Ecuador) Camila Romero	Daria Egorova (Italy) Giorgia Pedone	(Ecuador) Camila Romero (Peru) Lucciana Pérez Alarcón (Chile) Fernanda Labraña (Argentina) Francesca Mattioli
July 27	Brisbane, Australia; Hard; W15; Singles and doubles draws	(Japan) Mutsumi Uemura; 3–6, 6–4, 6–4	(Australia) Amy Stevens	(Australia) Laquisa Khan (Chinese Taipei) Tsao Chia-yi	(Japan) Natsuho Arakawa (Australia) Stefani Webb (Australia) Belle Thompson (Australia) Sarah Mildren
July 27	Brisbane, Australia; Hard; W15; Singles and doubles draws	(Australia) Lily Fairclough (Australia) Roisin Gilheany; 6–2, 6–2	(Japan) Mana Kawamura (Japan) Himari Satō	(Australia) Laquisa Khan (Chinese Taipei) Tsao Chia-yi	(Japan) Natsuho Arakawa (Australia) Stefani Webb (Australia) Belle Thompson (Australia) Sarah Mildren
July 27	Astana, Kazakhstan; Hard; W15; Singles and doubles draws	Edda Mamedova; 6–2, 6–4	Victoria Milovanova	(Kazakhstan) Eva Korysheva; Daria Zelinskaya	(Kazakhstan) Ingkar Dyussebay; Maria Sholokhova (Kazakhstan) Asylzhan Arystanbekova (Kazakhstan) Aiya Nupbay
July 27	Astana, Kazakhstan; Hard; W15; Singles and doubles draws	(Japan) Yuka Hosoki (Japan) Kisa Yoshioka; 4–6, 6–3, [10–7]	(Kazakhstan) Aruzhan Sagandykova; Daria Zelinskaya	(Kazakhstan) Eva Korysheva; Daria Zelinskaya	(Kazakhstan) Ingkar Dyussebay; Maria Sholokhova (Kazakhstan) Asylzhan Arystanbekova (Kazakhstan) Aiya Nupbay
July 27	Savitaipale, Finland; Clay; W15; Singles and doubles draws	(Latvia) Elza Tomase; 2–6, 6–2, 6–4	(Italy) Emma Ottavia Ghirardato	(Estonia) Maileen Nuudi (France) Dune Vaissaud	(Greece) Valentini Grammatikopoulou (Italy) Beatrice Stagno (Germany) Franziska Sziedat (Belgium) Alexandra Biot
July 27	Savitaipale, Finland; Clay; W15; Singles and doubles draws	(Belgium) Ema Kovacevic (France) Alice Soulié; 6–4, 2–6, [10–4]	(France) Justine Bretnacher (France) Margaux Komano	(Estonia) Maileen Nuudi (France) Dune Vaissaud	(Greece) Valentini Grammatikopoulou (Italy) Beatrice Stagno (Germany) Franziska Sziedat (Belgium) Alexandra Biot
July 27	Bielsko-Biała, Poland; Clay; W15; Singles and doubles draws	(Czech Republic) Emma Slavíková; 4–6, 7–6^{(8–6)}, 6–2	(Czech Republic) Lucie Petruzelová	(Germany) Sophia Ksandinov (Poland) Oriana Gniewkowska	(Norway) Astrid Brune Olsen; Polina Berezina (Czech Republic) Klára Kajabová (Slovakia) Laura Svatíková
July 27	Bielsko-Biała, Poland; Clay; W15; Singles and doubles draws	(Poland) Oriana Gniewkowska (Poland) Marcelina Podlińska; 7–5, 6–2	(Poland) Daria Gorska (Slovakia) Emma Slavíková	(Germany) Sophia Ksandinov (Poland) Oriana Gniewkowska	(Norway) Astrid Brune Olsen; Polina Berezina (Czech Republic) Klára Kajabová (Slovakia) Laura Svatíková
July 27	Rogaška Slatina, Slovenia; Clay; W15; Singles and doubles draws	(Slovenia) Alja Senica; 6–4, 5–7, 6–3	(Bosnia and Herzegovina) Sara Mikača	(Slovakia) Eszter Méri (Romania) Ștefania Bojică	(Italy) Arianna Zucchini (Italy) Lavinia Luciano (Italy) Federica Trevisan (Ukraine) Mariia Lazarenko
July 27	Rogaška Slatina, Slovenia; Clay; W15; Singles and doubles draws	(Romania) Ștefania Bojică (Slovenia) Alja Senica; 3–6, 6–4, [10–6]	(Slovenia) Petja Drame (United States) Megan Heuser	(Slovakia) Eszter Méri (Romania) Ștefania Bojică	(Italy) Arianna Zucchini (Italy) Lavinia Luciano (Italy) Federica Trevisan (Ukraine) Mariia Lazarenko
July 27	Kuršumlijska Banja, Serbia; Clay; W15; Singles and doubles draws	(Spain) Ariana Geerlings; 6–0, 6–4	(Denmark) Rebecca Munk Mortensen	(Italy) Vittoria Paganetti (Greece) Marianna Argyrokastriti	(Morocco) Aya El Aouni; Ustiniya Lekomtseva; Mariia Masiianskaia; Arina Bulatova
July 27	Kuršumlijska Banja, Serbia; Clay; W15; Singles and doubles draws	(Netherlands) Warda Ait el Bachir (Netherlands) Charlotte van Zonneveld; 6–3, 6–0	(France) Laïa Petretic (France) Helena Stevic	(Italy) Vittoria Paganetti (Greece) Marianna Argyrokastriti	(Morocco) Aya El Aouni; Ustiniya Lekomtseva; Mariia Masiianskaia; Arina Bulatova
July 27	Huamantla, Mexico; Hard; W15; Singles and doubles draws	(Israel) Mika Buchnik; 6–3, 6–0	(Mexico) Marianne Ángel	(Colombia) María José Sánchez Uribe (United States) Camille Allegre	(Italy) Anja Casari (Hong Kong) Kallista Liu (Mexico) Claudia Sofía Martínez Solís (United States) Gabriella Price
July 27	Huamantla, Mexico; Hard; W15; Singles and doubles draws	(United States) Isabella Foshee (Mexico) Montserrat Marrón Baruqui; 6–1, 6–3	(United States) Camille Allegre (United States) Olivia Allegre	(Colombia) María José Sánchez Uribe (United States) Camille Allegre	(Italy) Anja Casari (Hong Kong) Kallista Liu (Mexico) Claudia Sofía Martínez Solís (United States) Gabriella Price

=== August ===
Week of	Tournament	Winner	Runners-up	Semifinalists	Quarterfinalists
August 3	Koser Jewelers Tennis Challenge; Landisville, United States; Hard; W100; Singles and doubles draws	(Belgium) Hanne Vandewinkel; 3–6, 6–3, 6–1	Anastasia Zakharova	(Georgia (country)) Ekaterine Gorgodze (United States) Katrina Scott	(United States) Reese Brantmeier (United States) Caroline Dolehide (Japan) Mai Hontama (United States) Ayana Akli
August 3	Koser Jewelers Tennis Challenge; Landisville, United States; Hard; W100; Singles and doubles draws	(Chinese Taipei) Cho I-hsuan (Chinese Taipei) Cho Yi-tsen; 6–2, 6–4	(United States) Savannah Broadus (United States) Kylie Collins	(Georgia (country)) Ekaterine Gorgodze (United States) Katrina Scott	(United States) Reese Brantmeier (United States) Caroline Dolehide (Japan) Mai Hontama (United States) Ayana Akli
August 3	Ourense, Spain; Hard; W75; Singles and doubles draws	(Kazakhstan) Sonja Zhiyenbayeva; 7–6^{(7–2)}, 3–6, 6–1	(Bulgaria) Isabella Shinikova	(Netherlands) Britt du Pree (Japan) Rina Saigo	(Belgium) Greet Minnen; Kira Pavlova (United Kingdom) Alicia Dudeney; Daria Khomutsianskaya
August 3	Ourense, Spain; Hard; W75; Singles and doubles draws	(Portugal) Francisca Jorge (Portugal) Matilde Jorge; Walkover	(United Kingdom) Freya Christie (United Kingdom) Alicia Dudeney	(Netherlands) Britt du Pree (Japan) Rina Saigo	(Belgium) Greet Minnen; Kira Pavlova (United Kingdom) Alicia Dudeney; Daria Khomutsianskaya
August 3	Koksijde, Belgium; Clay; W75; Singles and doubles draws	(Italy) Noemi Basiletti; 2–6, 7–5, 7–5	(Czech Republic) Barbora Palicová	(Romania) Elena Ruxandra Bertea (Netherlands) Loes Ebeling Koning	(Italy) Tatiana Pieri (Spain) Ane Mintegi del Olmo (Belgium) Tilwith di Girolami (Greece) Martha Matoula
August 3	Koksijde, Belgium; Clay; W75; Singles and doubles draws	(Belgium) Kaat Coppez (Netherlands) Loes Ebeling Koning; 7–5, 3–6, [10–5]	(United States) Julia Adams (Netherlands) Merel Hoedt	(Romania) Elena Ruxandra Bertea (Netherlands) Loes Ebeling Koning	(Italy) Tatiana Pieri (Spain) Ane Mintegi del Olmo (Belgium) Tilwith di Girolami (Greece) Martha Matoula
August 3	Leipzig, Germany; Clay; W75; Singles and doubles draws	(Spain) Irene Burillo; 6–7^{(8–10)}, 6–4, 6–0	(Germany) Ida Wobker	(Czech Republic) Aneta Laboutková (Sweden) Caijsa Hennemann	(Italy) Aurora Zantedeschi (Uzbekistan) Laima Vladson (Germany) Valentina Steiner (Czech Republic) Alena Kovačková
August 3	Leipzig, Germany; Clay; W75; Singles and doubles draws	(Czech Republic) Aneta Kučmová (Czech Republic) Aneta Laboutková; 7–5, 6–2	(United States) Rasheeda McAdoo (Greece) Sapfo Sakellaridi	(Czech Republic) Aneta Laboutková (Sweden) Caijsa Hennemann	(Italy) Aurora Zantedeschi (Uzbekistan) Laima Vladson (Germany) Valentina Steiner (Czech Republic) Alena Kovačková
August 3	Roehampton, United Kingdom; Hard; W35; Singles and doubles draws	(United Kingdom) Amelia Rajecki; 6–0, 6–2	(United Kingdom) Ella McDonald	(United Kingdom) Emily Appleton (United Kingdom) Jodie Burrage	(United Kingdom) Allegra Korpanec Davies (Switzerland) Paula Cembranos (Japan) Hiromi Abe (United Kingdom) Brooke Black
August 3	Roehampton, United Kingdom; Hard; W35; Singles and doubles draws	(United Kingdom) Emily Appleton (United Kingdom) Ella McDonald; 7–5, 7–6^{(7–2)}	(United Kingdom) Brooke Black (Kenya) Angella Okutoyi	(United Kingdom) Emily Appleton (United Kingdom) Jodie Burrage	(United Kingdom) Allegra Korpanec Davies (Switzerland) Paula Cembranos (Japan) Hiromi Abe (United Kingdom) Brooke Black
August 3	Southaven, United States; Hard; W35; Singles and doubles draws	(Peru) Dana Guzmán; 6–2, 6–4	(United States) Annika Penickova	(United States) Anne Christine Lutkemeyer (South Korea) Lee Eun-hye	(China) Lu Jiajing (United States) Carson Tanguilig (Portugal) Angelina Voloshchuk (Romania) Carmen Andreea Herea
August 3	Southaven, United States; Hard; W35; Singles and doubles draws	(Romania) Carmen Andreea Herea (Ukraine) Anita Sahdiieva; 6–3, 5–7, [10–6]	(Mexico) María Fernanda Navarro Oliva (Mexico) Victoria Rodríguez	(United States) Anne Christine Lutkemeyer (South Korea) Lee Eun-hye	(China) Lu Jiajing (United States) Carson Tanguilig (Portugal) Angelina Voloshchuk (Romania) Carmen Andreea Herea
August 3	Chacabuco, Argentina; Clay; W35; Singles and doubles draws	(Italy) Giorgia Pedone; 6–4, 3–6, 6–0	(Mexico) Ana Sofía Sánchez	(Peru) Lucciana Pérez Alarcón (Argentina) Victoria Bosio	(Argentina) Josefina Estévez (Germany) Lorena Schaedel; Daria Egorova (Argentina) María Florencia Urrutia
August 3	Chacabuco, Argentina; Clay; W35; Singles and doubles draws	(Argentina) Sol Ailin Larraya Guidi (Colombia) Valentina Mediorreal; 7–6^{(7–5)}, 7–6^{(7–1)}	(Brazil) Júlia Konishi Camargo Silva (Chile) Fernanda Labraña	(Peru) Lucciana Pérez Alarcón (Argentina) Victoria Bosio	(Argentina) Josefina Estévez (Germany) Lorena Schaedel; Daria Egorova (Argentina) María Florencia Urrutia
August 3	Tianjin, China; Hard; W15; Singles and doubles draws	(China) Zhang Junhan; 4–6, 6–2, 6–1	(China) Zhu Chenting	(China) Yuan Chengyiyi (South Korea) Jang Ga-eul	(China) Lin Yujun (China) Wang Yuhan (Hong Kong) Shek Cheuk-ying (China) Wang Jiayi
August 3	Tianjin, China; Hard; W15; Singles and doubles draws	(China) Lin Yujun (China) Zhang Ruien; 6–1, 6–2	(China) Chen Mengyi (China) Wang Yuhan	(China) Yuan Chengyiyi (South Korea) Jang Ga-eul	(China) Lin Yujun (China) Wang Yuhan (Hong Kong) Shek Cheuk-ying (China) Wang Jiayi
August 3	Astana, Kazakhstan; Hard; W15; Singles and doubles draws	(Kazakhstan) Asylzhan Arystanbekova; 6–3, 6–1	(South Korea) Jang Su-jeong	(Japan) Kisa Yoshioka; Edda Mamedova	Victoria Milovanova; Arina Arifullina (Turkey) İrem Kurt; Anna Pushkareva
August 3	Astana, Kazakhstan; Hard; W15; Singles and doubles draws	(South Korea) Im Hee-rae (South Korea) Kim Eun-chae; 7–5, 6–3	(Kazakhstan) Asylzhan Arystanbekova (Kazakhstan) Ingkar Dyussebay	(Japan) Kisa Yoshioka; Edda Mamedova	Victoria Milovanova; Arina Arifullina (Turkey) İrem Kurt; Anna Pushkareva
August 3	Hämeenlinna, Finland; Clay; W15; Singles and doubles draws	(Czech Republic) Amelie Justine Hejtmanek; 6–4, 2–6, 6–4	(Finland) Laura Hietaranta	(United States) Rachel Gailis (Germany) Victoria Pohle	(Netherlands) Klara Veldman (Ukraine) Daria Lopatetska (Netherlands) Madelief Hageman (France) Dune Vaissaud
August 3	Hämeenlinna, Finland; Clay; W15; Singles and doubles draws	(Finland) Clarissa Blomqvist (Finland) Iida Heinonen; 7–6^{(8–6)}, 3–6, [10–7]	(Czech Republic) Amelie Justine Hejtmanek (Czech Republic) Lucie Urbanová	(United States) Rachel Gailis (Germany) Victoria Pohle	(Netherlands) Klara Veldman (Ukraine) Daria Lopatetska (Netherlands) Madelief Hageman (France) Dune Vaissaud
August 3	Kuršumlijska Banja, Serbia; Clay; W15; Singles and doubles draws	Felitsata Dorofeeva-Rybas; 6–2, 6–4	(Bulgaria) Denislava Glushkova	(Italy) Vittoria Paganetti (Colombia) María Herazo	(Netherlands) Charlotte van Zonneveld; Arina Bulatova; Mariia Masiianskaia (Morocco) Aya El Aouni
August 3	Kuršumlijska Banja, Serbia; Clay; W15; Singles and doubles draws	Felitsata Dorofeeva-Rybas; Varvara Panshina; 4–6, 7–6^{(7–3)}, [10–4]	(Colombia) María Herazo (United States) Mia Horvit	(Italy) Vittoria Paganetti (Colombia) María Herazo	(Netherlands) Charlotte van Zonneveld; Arina Bulatova; Mariia Masiianskaia (Morocco) Aya El Aouni
August 10	Serbian Tennis Tour; Kuršumlijska Banja, Serbia; Clay; W75; Singles and doubles draws	(Serbia) Mia Ristić; 6–0, 7–6^{(7–4)}	(Bulgaria) Rositsa Dencheva	(Serbia) Luna Vujović (Italy) Matilde Paoletti	(Ukraine) Katarina Zavatska; Darya Astakhova (Sweden) Lisa Zaar; Rada Zolotareva
August 10	Serbian Tennis Tour; Kuršumlijska Banja, Serbia; Clay; W75; Singles and doubles draws	(Bulgaria) Rositsa Dencheva; Varvara Panshina; 6–4, 7–5	(China) Feng Shuo (China) Li Zongyu	(Serbia) Luna Vujović (Italy) Matilde Paoletti	(Ukraine) Katarina Zavatska; Darya Astakhova (Sweden) Lisa Zaar; Rada Zolotareva
August 10	Hamburg Ladies & Gents Cup; Hamburg, Germany; Clay; W50; Singles and doubles draws	(Czech Republic) Anna Sisková; 7–6^{(8–6)}, 1–6, 6–3	(United States) Rasheeda McAdoo	(Spain) Ruth Roura Llaverías (Uzbekistan) Laima Vladson	(South Korea) Park So-hyun (Netherlands) Merel Hoedt (Germany) Marie Vogt (Spain) Alicia Herrero Liñana
August 10	Hamburg Ladies & Gents Cup; Hamburg, Germany; Clay; W50; Singles and doubles draws	(Japan) Momoko Kobori (Japan) Ayano Shimizu; 6–4, 6–2	(Ukraine) Valeriya Strakhova; Anastasia Tikhonova	(Spain) Ruth Roura Llaverías (Uzbekistan) Laima Vladson	(South Korea) Park So-hyun (Netherlands) Merel Hoedt (Germany) Marie Vogt (Spain) Alicia Herrero Liñana
August 10	Aldershot, United Kingdom; Hard; W35; Singles and doubles draws	(Switzerland) Susan Bandecchi; 7–5, 6–0	(United States) Alana Smith	(United Kingdom) Jodie Burrage; Julia Avdeeva	(United Kingdom) Mimi Xu (United Kingdom) Victoria Allen (Belgium) Katarina Kujovic (United Kingdom) Emily Appleton
August 10	Aldershot, United Kingdom; Hard; W35; Singles and doubles draws	(United Kingdom) Jodie Burrage (United Kingdom) Freya Christie; 6–7^{(4–7)}, 6–3, [11–9]	(United Kingdom) Daniella Britton (United Kingdom) Savannah Dada-Mascoll	(United Kingdom) Jodie Burrage; Julia Avdeeva	(United Kingdom) Mimi Xu (United Kingdom) Victoria Allen (Belgium) Katarina Kujovic (United Kingdom) Emily Appleton
August 10	Vigo, Spain; Hard; W35; Singles and doubles draws	(Kazakhstan) Sonja Zhiyenbayeva; 7–6^{(8–6)}, 7–5	(China) Ren Yufei	(Portugal) Matilde Jorge (Netherlands) Britt du Pree	(Belgium) Sofia Costoulas; Daria Khomutsianskaya (Portugal) Francisca Jorge; Kira Pavlova
August 10	Vigo, Spain; Hard; W35; Singles and doubles draws	(Spain) Victoria Gómez O'Hayon (Netherlands) Arantxa Rus; 6–3, 6–4	Ekaterina Yashina (Kazakhstan) Sonja Zhiyenbayeva	(Portugal) Matilde Jorge (Netherlands) Britt du Pree	(Belgium) Sofia Costoulas; Daria Khomutsianskaya (Portugal) Francisca Jorge; Kira Pavlova
August 10	Bydgoszcz, Poland; Clay; W35; Singles and doubles draws	(Poland) Daria Kuczer; 6–7^{(6–8)}, 7–6^{(7–5)}, 6–1	(Ukraine) Yelyzaveta Kotliar	(Slovenia) Dalila Jakupović (Sweden) Nellie Taraba Wallberg	(Georgia (country)) Sofia Shapatava (Germany) Joëlle Steur (Czech Republic) Amy Suchá (Italy) Tatiana Pieri
August 10	Bydgoszcz, Poland; Clay; W35; Singles and doubles draws	(Hungary) Adrienn Nagy (Germany) Joëlle Steur; 6–1, 6–7^{(6–8)}, [10–8]	(Italy) Gaia Maduzzi (Italy) Viola Turini	(Slovenia) Dalila Jakupović (Sweden) Nellie Taraba Wallberg	(Georgia (country)) Sofia Shapatava (Germany) Joëlle Steur (Czech Republic) Amy Suchá (Italy) Tatiana Pieri
August 10	Tianjin, China; Hard; W15; Singles and doubles draws	(China) Yuan Chengyiyi; 3–6, 6–1, 6–4	(Thailand) Thasaporn Naklo	(China) Shao Yushan (Malaysia) Shihomi Leong	(China) Lin Yujun (China) Lan Xiran (Singapore) Eva Marie Desvignes (Chinese Taipei) Yang Ya-yi
August 10	Tianjin, China; Hard; W15; Singles and doubles draws	(China) Hou Yanan (Thailand) Peangtarn Plipuech; 6–4, 6–2	(Thailand) Kamonwan Yodpetch (China) Zhang Ruien	(China) Shao Yushan (Malaysia) Shihomi Leong	(China) Lin Yujun (China) Lan Xiran (Singapore) Eva Marie Desvignes (Chinese Taipei) Yang Ya-yi
August 10	Astana, Kazakhstan; Hard; W15; Singles and doubles draws	(Kazakhstan) Asylzhan Arystanbekova; 6–2, 6–2	(Japan) Haruna Arakawa	(South Korea) Lee Ha-eum (Turkey) İrem Kurt	(India) Zeel Desai (South Korea) Jang Su-jeong; Arina Arifullina; Anna Pushkareva
August 10	Astana, Kazakhstan; Hard; W15; Singles and doubles draws	(South Korea) Kim Eun-chae (South Korea) Lee Ha-eum; 6–1, 6–4	Mariia Tkacheva; Daria Zelinskaya	(South Korea) Lee Ha-eum (Turkey) İrem Kurt	(India) Zeel Desai (South Korea) Jang Su-jeong; Arina Arifullina; Anna Pushkareva
August 10	Bucharest, Romania; Clay; W15; Singles and doubles draws	(Romania) Maria Sara Popa; 6–4, 6–4	(Germany) Ida Wobker	(Romania) Diana-Ioana Simionescu (Romania) Cristiana Nicoleta Todoni	(Italy) Angelica Raggi (Romania) Maia Ilinca Burcescu (Italy) Marta Lombardini (Romania) Oana Georgeta Simion
August 10	Bucharest, Romania; Clay; W15; Singles and doubles draws	(Romania) Alesia Breaz (Romania) Cristiana Nicoleta Todoni; 7–6^{(7–5)}, 6–4	(France) Océane Babel (Italy) Federica Sacco	(Romania) Diana-Ioana Simionescu (Romania) Cristiana Nicoleta Todoni	(Italy) Angelica Raggi (Romania) Maia Ilinca Burcescu (Italy) Marta Lombardini (Romania) Oana Georgeta Simion
August 10	Campos do Jordão, Brazil; Hard; W15; Singles and doubles draws	(Brazil) Luiza Fullana; 6–4, 6–2	(China) Mi Lan	(Brazil) Marjorie Souza (Brazil) Carolina Bohrer Martins	(Argentina) Lourdes Ayala (Brazil) Victoria Luiza Barros (Brazil) Beatriz Guerra (Israel) Maayan Laron
August 10	Campos do Jordão, Brazil; Hard; W15; Singles and doubles draws	(Brazil) Victoria Luiza Barros (China) Mi Lan; 7–6^{(7–5)}, 7–6^{(7–3)}	(Brazil) Carolina Bohrer Martins (Brazil) Letícia Garcia Vidal	(Brazil) Marjorie Souza (Brazil) Carolina Bohrer Martins	(Argentina) Lourdes Ayala (Brazil) Victoria Luiza Barros (Brazil) Beatriz Guerra (Israel) Maayan Laron
August 17	Serbian Tennis Tour 2 Kuršumlijska Banja, Serbia; Clay; W75; Singles and doubles draws	Rada Zolotareva; 6–4, 6–1	(Bulgaria) Lidia Encheva	(Sweden) Lisa Zaar (Serbia) Luna Vujović	Darya Astakhova (Italy) Giorgia Pedone (Romania) Elena Ruxandra Bertea (Italy) Samira De Stefano
August 17	Serbian Tennis Tour 2 Kuršumlijska Banja, Serbia; Clay; W75; Singles and doubles draws	Varvara Panshina; Rada Zolotareva; 7–5, 6–4	(Croatia) Lucija Ćirić Bagarić (Poland) Weronika Falkowska	(Sweden) Lisa Zaar (Serbia) Luna Vujović	Darya Astakhova (Italy) Giorgia Pedone (Romania) Elena Ruxandra Bertea (Italy) Samira De Stefano
August 17	Advantage Cars Prague Open; Prague, Czechia; Clay; W50; Singles and doubles draws	(Czech Republic) Jana Kovačková; 6–1, 6–1	(China) Gao Xinyu	(Ukraine) Yelyzaveta Kotliar (Czech Republic) Alena Kovačková	(Czech Republic) Lucie Havlíčková (Slovenia) Pia Lovrič (Spain) Alicia Herrero Liñana (Germany) Nastasja Schunk
August 17	Advantage Cars Prague Open; Prague, Czechia; Clay; W50; Singles and doubles draws	(Czech Republic) Alena Kovačková (Czech Republic) Jana Kovačková; 6–2, 6–3	(Ukraine) Valeriya Strakhova; Anastasia Tikhonova	(Ukraine) Yelyzaveta Kotliar (Czech Republic) Alena Kovačková	(Czech Republic) Lucie Havlíčková (Slovenia) Pia Lovrič (Spain) Alicia Herrero Liñana (Germany) Nastasja Schunk
August 17	Verbier, Switzerland; Clay; W35; Singles and doubles draws	(Greece) Valentini Grammatikopoulou; 6–4, 6–1	(France) Jenny Lim	(Serbia) Anastasija Cvetković (Canada) Ana Grubor	(Germany) Mara Guth (Kenya) Angella Okutoyi (Switzerland) Elsa Bonelli (Germany) Franziska Sziedat
August 17	Verbier, Switzerland; Clay; W35; Singles and doubles draws	(Denmark) Emma Kamper (Kenya) Angella Okutoyi; 6–4, 4–6, [10–7]	(Serbia) Anastasija Cvetković (Switzerland) Sarina Schnyder	(Serbia) Anastasija Cvetković (Canada) Ana Grubor	(Germany) Mara Guth (Kenya) Angella Okutoyi (Switzerland) Elsa Bonelli (Germany) Franziska Sziedat
August 17	Erwitte, Germany; Clay; W35; Singles and doubles draws	(Germany) Valentina Steiner; 3–6, 6–1, 6–3	(Germany) Josy Daems	(Germany) Lola Giza (Germany) Joëlle Steur	(Australia) Tahlia Kokkinis (South Korea) Park So-hyun (India) Sahaja Yamalapalli (Germany) Tessa Brockmann
August 17	Erwitte, Germany; Clay; W35; Singles and doubles draws	(New Zealand) Monique Barry (South Korea) Park So-hyun; 6–7^{(0–7)}, 6–3, [10–7]	(Netherlands) Madelief Hageman (Netherlands) Klara Veldman	(Germany) Lola Giza (Germany) Joëlle Steur	(Australia) Tahlia Kokkinis (South Korea) Park So-hyun (India) Sahaja Yamalapalli (Germany) Tessa Brockmann
August 17	Kraków, Poland; Clay; W35; Singles and doubles draws	(Spain) Ariana Geerlings; 6–4, 6–3	(Slovenia) Dalila Jakupović	(Poland) Zuzanna Pawlikowska (Slovakia) Radka Zelníčková	(Poland) Oriana Gniewkowska (Poland) Anna Kmiecik; Polina Leykina (Italy) Gaia Maduzzi
August 17	Kraków, Poland; Clay; W35; Singles and doubles draws	(Italy) Gaia Maduzzi (Italy) Francesca Pace; 7–6^{(7–3)}, 6–4	(Poland) Daria Górska (Poland) Amelia Paszun	(Poland) Zuzanna Pawlikowska (Slovakia) Radka Zelníčková	(Poland) Oriana Gniewkowska (Poland) Anna Kmiecik; Polina Leykina (Italy) Gaia Maduzzi
August 17	Bistrița, Romania; Clay; W35; Singles and doubles draws	(Romania) Teodora Miron; 6–3, 2–6, 6–4	(Hungary) Adrienn Nagy	(Italy) Jessica Pieri (Poland) Weronika Ewald	(Switzerland) Marie Mettraux (Romania) Maria Sara Popa (Italy) Camilla Zanolini (Romania) Diana-Ioana Simionescu
August 17	Bistrița, Romania; Clay; W35; Singles and doubles draws	(Hungary) Adrienn Nagy (Romania) Oana Georgeta Simion; 6–1, 6–3	(Romania) Patricia Georgiana Goina (Romania) Simona Ogescu	(Italy) Jessica Pieri (Poland) Weronika Ewald	(Switzerland) Marie Mettraux (Romania) Maria Sara Popa (Italy) Camilla Zanolini (Romania) Diana-Ioana Simionescu
August 17	Tianjin, China; Hard; W15; Singles and doubles draws	(Japan) Rinko Matsuda; 6–3, 4–6, 6–1	(China) Chen Mengyi	(Thailand) Peangtarn Plipuech (South Korea) Jeong Su-nam	(China) Zhu Chenting (Chinese Taipei) Yang Ya-yi (Singapore) Eva Marie Desvignes (China) Wei Sijia
August 17	Tianjin, China; Hard; W15; Singles and doubles draws	(Thailand) Kamonwan Yodpetch (China) Zhang Ruien; 6–3, 1–6, [10–7]	(Chinese Taipei) Lin Fang-an (Chinese Taipei) Yang Ya-yi	(Thailand) Peangtarn Plipuech (South Korea) Jeong Su-nam	(China) Zhu Chenting (Chinese Taipei) Yang Ya-yi (Singapore) Eva Marie Desvignes (China) Wei Sijia
August 17	Logroño, Spain; Hard; W15; Singles and doubles draws	(Spain) Juliana Giaccio; 6–3, 6–2	(Georgia (country)) Zoziya Kardava	(Spain) Charo Esquiva Bañuls (Switzerland) Paula Cembranos	(Japan) Sayaka Ishii; Yuliya Hatouka (United States) Jenna DeFalco (Spain) Isabel Pascual Montalvo
August 17	Logroño, Spain; Hard; W15; Singles and doubles draws	(United States) Jenna DeFalco (Mexico) Julia García Ruiz; 2–6, 6–4, [11–9]	(Spain) Olga Bienzobas Fernandez (Estonia) Anet Koskel	(Spain) Charo Esquiva Bañuls (Switzerland) Paula Cembranos	(Japan) Sayaka Ishii; Yuliya Hatouka (United States) Jenna DeFalco (Spain) Isabel Pascual Montalvo
August 17	Wanfercée-Baulet, Belgium; Clay; W15; Singles and doubles draws	Maria Andrienko; 7–5, 6–0	(Belgium) Lisa Claeys	(Netherlands) Rikke de Koning (Belgium) Romane Longueville	(Norway) Astrid Brune Olsen (Netherlands) Warda Ait el Bachir (Germany) Victoria Pohle (Belgium) Margaux Maquet
August 17	Wanfercée-Baulet, Belgium; Clay; W15; Singles and doubles draws	(Netherlands) Rikke de Koning (Belgium) Romane Longueville; 6–2, 5–7, [10–4]	Maria Andrienko (Belgium) Lisa Claeys	(Netherlands) Rikke de Koning (Belgium) Romane Longueville	(Norway) Astrid Brune Olsen (Netherlands) Warda Ait el Bachir (Germany) Victoria Pohle (Belgium) Margaux Maquet
August 17	Campos do Jordão, Brazil; Hard; W15; Singles and doubles draws	(Brazil) Carolina Bohrer Martins; 6–2, 7–6^{(7–3)}	(Brazil) Luiza Fullana	(Brazil) Ana Candiotto (Brazil) Victoria Luiza Barros	(United States) Isabella Barrera Aguirre (Brazil) Marjorie Souza (Colombia) María José Sánchez Uribe (Israel) Maayan Laron
August 17	Campos do Jordão, Brazil; Hard; W15; Singles and doubles draws	(Brazil) Ana Candiotto (China) Mi Lan; 6–0, 7–5	(Brazil) Luiza Fullana (Brazil) Marjorie Souza	(Brazil) Ana Candiotto (Brazil) Victoria Luiza Barros	(United States) Isabella Barrera Aguirre (Brazil) Marjorie Souza (Colombia) María José Sánchez Uribe (Israel) Maayan Laron
August 24	Bytom, Poland; Clay; W75; Singles and doubles draws	(Czech Republic) Barbora Palicová; 3–6, 7–5, 6–4	(Czech Republic) Denisa Žoldáková	(Germany) Mina Hodzic (Lithuania) Justina Mikulskytė	(Ukraine) Katarina Zavatska (China) Gao Xinyu (Italy) Gaia Maduzzi (Spain) Ariana Geerlings
August 24	Bytom, Poland; Clay; W75; Singles and doubles draws	(China) Feng Shuo (China) Li Zongyu; 6–4, 6–2	(Romania) Oana Gavrilă (Greece) Sapfo Sakellaridi	(Germany) Mina Hodzic (Lithuania) Justina Mikulskytė	(Ukraine) Katarina Zavatska (China) Gao Xinyu (Italy) Gaia Maduzzi (Spain) Ariana Geerlings
August 24	Oldenzaal, Netherlands; Clay; W50; Singles and doubles draws	(Germany) Nastasja Schunk; 7–5, 6–4	(Italy) Francesca Pace	(Germany) Joëlle Steur (Netherlands) Loes Ebeling Koning	(Netherlands) Britt du Pree (France) Amandine Monnot (Spain) Alicia Herrero Liñana (Croatia) Tena Lukas
August 24	Oldenzaal, Netherlands; Clay; W50; Singles and doubles draws	(Germany) Tayisiya Morderger (Germany) Yana Morderger; 6–3, 6–3	(Bulgaria) Isabella Shinikova (Netherlands) Lian Tran	(Germany) Joëlle Steur (Netherlands) Loes Ebeling Koning	(Netherlands) Britt du Pree (France) Amandine Monnot (Spain) Alicia Herrero Liñana (Croatia) Tena Lukas
August 24	Serbian Tennis Tour 3 Kuršumlijska Banja, Serbia; Clay; W50; Singles and doubles draws	(Italy) Samira De Stefano; 6–0, 6–1	(Serbia) Anja Stanković	(Bulgaria) Rositsa Dencheva; Maria Golovina	(France) Séléna Janicijevic (Serbia) Elena Milovanović (Croatia) Lea Bošković (Italy) Giorgia Pedone
August 24	Serbian Tennis Tour 3 Kuršumlijska Banja, Serbia; Clay; W50; Singles and doubles draws	(Bulgaria) Rositsa Dencheva; Maria Golovina; 6–4, 6–7^{(0–7)}, [10–7]	(Bulgaria) Lia Karatancheva (India) Prarthana Thombare	(Bulgaria) Rositsa Dencheva; Maria Golovina	(France) Séléna Janicijevic (Serbia) Elena Milovanović (Croatia) Lea Bošković (Italy) Giorgia Pedone
August 24	Verbier, Switzerland; Clay; W35; Singles and doubles draws	(Serbia) Anastasija Cvetković; 6–4, 6–3	(Kenya) Angella Okutoyi	(Switzerland) Valentina Ryser (France) Emma Léné	(Germany) Mara Guth (Greece) Valentini Grammatikopoulou (Germany) Julia Stusek (Ukraine) Valeriya Strakhova
August 24	Verbier, Switzerland; Clay; W35; Singles and doubles draws	(France) Tiphanie Lemaître (Kenya) Angella Okutoyi; 6–4, 6–7^{(3–7)}, [10–5]	(Greece) Valentini Grammatikopoulou (Ukraine) Valeriya Strakhova	(Switzerland) Valentina Ryser (France) Emma Léné	(Germany) Mara Guth (Greece) Valentini Grammatikopoulou (Germany) Julia Stusek (Ukraine) Valeriya Strakhova
August 24	Trieste, Italy; Clay; W35; Singles and doubles draws	(Brazil) Gabriela Cé; 4–6, 6–1, 6–4	(Slovenia) Pia Lovrič	(Germany) Valentina Steiner (Spain) Aran Teixidó García	(Argentina) Paula Ormaechea (Italy) Federica Sacco (Switzerland) Marie Mettraux (Italy) Martina Colmegna
August 24	Trieste, Italy; Clay; W35; Singles and doubles draws	(Italy) Matilde Mariani (Italy) Federica Sacco; 6–3, 6–3	(Czech Republic) Veronika Kulhavá (Italy) Federica Trevisan	(Germany) Valentina Steiner (Spain) Aran Teixidó García	(Argentina) Paula Ormaechea (Italy) Federica Sacco (Switzerland) Marie Mettraux (Italy) Martina Colmegna
August 24	Barueri, Brazil; Hard; W35; Singles and doubles draws	(Canada) Cadence Brace; 1–6, 7–5, 6–3	(China) Mi Lan	(Brazil) Naná Silva (Mexico) Ana Sofía Sánchez	(Brazil) Victoria Luiza Barros (Brazil) Ana Candiotto (Brazil) Carolina Alves (United States) Carolyn Ansari
August 24	Barueri, Brazil; Hard; W35; Singles and doubles draws	(Venezuela) Sofía Cabezas Domínguez (Brazil) Ana Candiotto; 6–4, 6–2	(Mexico) María Fernanda Navarro Oliva (Ecuador) Camila Romero	(Brazil) Naná Silva (Mexico) Ana Sofía Sánchez	(Brazil) Victoria Luiza Barros (Brazil) Ana Candiotto (Brazil) Carolina Alves (United States) Carolyn Ansari
August 24	Tianjin, China; Hard; W15; Singles and doubles draws	(China) Shi Han; 6–3, 6–1	(China) Han Jiangxue	(India) Vaishnavi Adkar (Indonesia) Priska Nugroho	(China) Lu Jiajing (Thailand) Peangtarn Plipuech (South Korea) Lee Eun-hye (China) Zheng Wushuang
August 24	Tianjin, China; Hard; W15; Singles and doubles draws	(Thailand) Patcharin Cheapchandej (Thailand) Kamonwan Yodpetch; 2–6, 6–3, [10–8]	(South Korea) Im Hee-rae (South Korea) Kim Eun-chae	(India) Vaishnavi Adkar (Indonesia) Priska Nugroho	(China) Lu Jiajing (Thailand) Peangtarn Plipuech (South Korea) Lee Eun-hye (China) Zheng Wushuang
August 24	Torelló, Spain; Hard; W15; Singles and doubles draws	(United States) Anne Christine Lutkemeyer; 4–6, 6–0, 6–4	(Spain) Celia Cerviño Ruiz	(Slovakia) Katarína Kužmová (Mexico) Julia García Ruiz	(United States) Katherine Hui (Spain) Alice Ferlito (United States) Jenna DeFalco (Netherlands) Stéphanie Visscher
August 24	Torelló, Spain; Hard; W15; Singles and doubles draws	(Spain) Aliona Bolsova (Spain) Celia Cerviño Ruiz; 6–2, 6–2	(Mexico) Julia García Ruiz (Spain) Ariadna Garcia-Patrón Canals	(Slovakia) Katarína Kužmová (Mexico) Julia García Ruiz	(United States) Katherine Hui (Spain) Alice Ferlito (United States) Jenna DeFalco (Netherlands) Stéphanie Visscher
August 24	Brașov, Romania; Clay; W15; Singles and doubles draws	(United States) Ashley Lahey; 4–6, 6–2, 7–5	(Romania) Ilinca Amariei	(Romania) Georgia Crăciun (Romania) Cristiana Nicoleta Todoni	(Romania) Maria Sara Popa (Romania) Teodora Miron (Romania) Patricia Georgiana Goina (Romania) Bianca Bărbulescu
August 24	Brașov, Romania; Clay; W15; Singles and doubles draws	(Spain) Cristina Díaz Adrover (Italy) Angelica Raggi; 6–2, 6–1	(Romania) Simona Ogescu (Romania) Ana Ioana Vârșa	(Romania) Georgia Crăciun (Romania) Cristiana Nicoleta Todoni	(Romania) Maria Sara Popa (Romania) Teodora Miron (Romania) Patricia Georgiana Goina (Romania) Bianca Bărbulescu
August 24	Hurghada, Egypt; Hard; W15; Singles and doubles draws	(France) Dune Vaissaud; 6–2, 6–1	(Germany) Emilia Carlotta Brune	Mariia Tkacheva (Ukraine) Kateryna Diatlova	(Netherlands) Coco Bosman (Belgium) Katarina Kujovic (Egypt) Yasmin Ezzat (Australia) Naomi McKenzie
August 24	Hurghada, Egypt; Hard; W15; Singles and doubles draws	(Egypt) Yasmin Ezzat (France) Laïa Petretic; 6–4, 4–6, [10–8]	(Netherlands) Coco Bosman (France) Alyssa Réguer	Mariia Tkacheva (Ukraine) Kateryna Diatlova	(Netherlands) Coco Bosman (Belgium) Katarina Kujovic (Egypt) Yasmin Ezzat (Australia) Naomi McKenzie
August 24	Monastir, Tunisia; Hard; W15; Singles and doubles draws	(United States) Sofia Rojas; 6–3, 6–1	(Japan) Riko Kikawada	(Canada) Alexandra Vagramov (Finland) Clarissa Blomqvist	(Germany) Johanna Silva (Italy) Aurora Nosei (New Zealand) Elyse Tse (Japan) Haruna Arakawa
August 24	Monastir, Tunisia; Hard; W15; Singles and doubles draws	(Japan) Riko Kikawada (New Zealand) Elyse Tse; 7–6^{(7–5)}, 6–4	(Finland) Clarissa Blomqvist (Canada) Alexandra Vagramov	(Canada) Alexandra Vagramov (Finland) Clarissa Blomqvist	(Germany) Johanna Silva (Italy) Aurora Nosei (New Zealand) Elyse Tse (Japan) Haruna Arakawa
August 31	Tianjin, China; Hard; W75; Singles and doubles draws	(Chinese Taipei) Joanna Garland; 6–3, 6–2	Darya Astakhova	(China) Bai Zhuoxuan (Thailand) Patcharin Cheapchandej	(Belgium) Sofia Costoulas (Slovakia) Viktória Morvayová (China) Shi Han (China) Wang Jiaqi
August 31	Tianjin, China; Hard; W75; Singles and doubles draws	(Japan) Momoko Kobori (Japan) Ayano Shimizu; 6–0, 4–6, [10–8]	(Chinese Taipei) Li Yu-yun (China) Zhang Ying	(China) Bai Zhuoxuan (Thailand) Patcharin Cheapchandej	(Belgium) Sofia Costoulas (Slovakia) Viktória Morvayová (China) Shi Han (China) Wang Jiaqi
August 31	Leiria, Portugal; Hard; W50; Singles and doubles draws	(United Kingdom) Hannah Klugman; 7–5, 4–6, 6–1	(Czech Republic) Linda Fruhvirtová	(Germany) Caroline Werner (United Kingdom) Sofia Johnson	(France) Océane Dodin (Switzerland) Chelsea Fontenel; Anastasia Gasanova (United States) Malaika Rapolu
August 31	Leiria, Portugal; Hard; W50; Singles and doubles draws	(United Kingdom) Madeleine Brooks (United Kingdom) Amelia Rajecki; 6–4, 7–6^{(7–1)}	(Switzerland) Chelsea Fontenel (Netherlands) Stéphanie Visscher	(Germany) Caroline Werner (United Kingdom) Sofia Johnson	(France) Océane Dodin (Switzerland) Chelsea Fontenel; Anastasia Gasanova (United States) Malaika Rapolu
August 31	Saint-Palais-sur-Mer, France; Clay; W50; Singles and doubles draws	(France) Fiona Ferro; 2–6, 6–3, 7–5	(France) Clara Burel	(Italy) Francesca Pace (Italy) Federica Urgesi	(Italy) Diletta Cherubini (France) Alice Tubello (France) Emma Léné (Argentina) María Lourdes Carlé
August 31	Saint-Palais-sur-Mer, France; Clay; W50; Singles and doubles draws	(Finland) Laura Hietaranta (Netherlands) Sarah van Emst; 6–2, 6–4	(Ukraine) Valeriya Strakhova (Netherlands) Demi Tran	(Italy) Francesca Pace (Italy) Federica Urgesi	(Italy) Diletta Cherubini (France) Alice Tubello (France) Emma Léné (Argentina) María Lourdes Carlé
August 31	Serbian Tennis Tour 4 Kuršumlijska Banja, Serbia; Clay; W35; Singles and doubles draws	Ksenia Zaytseva; 6–4, 6–3	(Italy) Giorgia Pedone	(France) Nina Radovanovic (Germany) Anna Petkovic	(France) Séléna Janicijevic (Italy) Miriana Tona (Serbia) Anastasija Cvetković (France) Sara Cakarevic
August 31	Serbian Tennis Tour 4 Kuršumlijska Banja, Serbia; Clay; W35; Singles and doubles draws	Alina Yuneva; Ksenia Zaytseva; 6–0, 6–4	Maria Golovina (Serbia) Natalija Senić	(France) Nina Radovanovic (Germany) Anna Petkovic	(France) Séléna Janicijevic (Italy) Miriana Tona (Serbia) Anastasija Cvetković (France) Sara Cakarevic
August 31	Yeongwol, South Korea; Hard; W15; Singles and doubles draws	(Japan) Naho Sato; 6–3, 6–2	(Thailand) Kamonwan Yodpetch	(South Korea) Kim Yu-jin (Japan) Kanon Sawashiro	(China) Zhu Chenting (Japan) Sae Noguchi (South Korea) Kim Da-bin (South Korea) Jang Soo-ha
August 31	Yeongwol, South Korea; Hard; W15; Singles and doubles draws	(South Korea) Jeong Bo-young (South Korea) Kim Na-ri; 6–4, 6–2	(Japan) Chihiro Muramatsu (Japan) Kisa Yoshioka	(South Korea) Kim Yu-jin (Japan) Kanon Sawashiro	(China) Zhu Chenting (Japan) Sae Noguchi (South Korea) Kim Da-bin (South Korea) Jang Soo-ha
August 31	Badalona, Spain; Clay; W15; Singles and doubles draws	(United States) Ashley Lahey; 6–4, 2–6, 6–4	(Greece) Marianna Argyrokastriti	(Italy) Laura Mair (Spain) Ruth Roura Llaverías	(Spain) Ana Giraldi Requena (Spain) Esther Lopez Alcaraz; Aleksandra Pozarenko (Croatia) Iva Primorac Pavičić
August 31	Badalona, Spain; Clay; W15; Singles and doubles draws	(United States) Katherine Hui (United States) Anne Christine Lutkemeyer; 6–2, 6–3	(Italy) Sonia Cassani (Spain) Gabriela Paun	(Italy) Laura Mair (Spain) Ruth Roura Llaverías	(Spain) Ana Giraldi Requena (Spain) Esther Lopez Alcaraz; Aleksandra Pozarenko (Croatia) Iva Primorac Pavičić
August 31	Cap d'Agde, France; Clay; W15; Singles and doubles draws	(South Africa) Jahnie van Zyl; 7–5, 6–0	(Czech Republic) Michaela Bayerlová	Tatsiana Sasnouskaya (Belgium) Romane Longueville	(France) Daphnée Mpetshi Perricard (Italy) Chiara Fornasieri (Spain) Marta Soriano Santiago (France) Marine Szostak
August 31	Cap d'Agde, France; Clay; W15; Singles and doubles draws	(Switzerland) Sophie Luescher (Switzerland) Marie Mettraux; 6–2, 7–5	(Slovakia) Karolína Krajmer; Kseniya Yersh	Tatsiana Sasnouskaya (Belgium) Romane Longueville	(France) Daphnée Mpetshi Perricard (Italy) Chiara Fornasieri (Spain) Marta Soriano Santiago (France) Marine Szostak
August 31	Haren, Netherlands; Clay; W15; Singles and doubles draws	(Netherlands) Charlotte van Zonneveld; 6–3, 6–2	(United States) Mia Horvit	(Germany) Victoria Brand (Netherlands) Rikke de Koning	(Belgium) Lisa Claeys (Germany) Sonja Zhenikhova (Netherlands) Lian Tran (Netherlands) Joy de Zeeuw
August 31	Haren, Netherlands; Clay; W15; Singles and doubles draws	(Netherlands) Annika Barth (Netherlands) Jade Groen; 6–1, 4–6, [10–6]	(Belgium) Kaat Coppez (United States) Mia Horvit	(Germany) Victoria Brand (Netherlands) Rikke de Koning	(Belgium) Lisa Claeys (Germany) Sonja Zhenikhova (Netherlands) Lian Tran (Netherlands) Joy de Zeeuw
August 31	Fiano Romano, Italy; Clay; W15; Singles and doubles draws	(Italy) Federica Trevisan; 6–1, 7–5	(Italy) Noemi Maines	(Italy) Francesca Gandolfi (Italy) Agnese Gentili	(Georgia (country)) Sofia Shapatava (Argentina) Paula Ormaechea (Italy) Carolina Gasparini (Germany) Eva Marie Voracek
August 31	Fiano Romano, Italy; Clay; W15; Singles and doubles draws	(Czech Republic) Linda Ševčíková (Germany) Eva Marie Voracek; 3–6, 6–1, [10–8]	(Italy) Beatrice Stagno (Latvia) Elza Tomase	(Italy) Francesca Gandolfi (Italy) Agnese Gentili	(Georgia (country)) Sofia Shapatava (Argentina) Paula Ormaechea (Italy) Carolina Gasparini (Germany) Eva Marie Voracek
August 31	Grodzisk Mazowiecki, Poland; Hard; W15; Singles and doubles draws	(Ukraine) Kateryna Lazarenko; 7–5, 3–6, 6–4	(Poland) Zuzanna Bednarz	(United Kingdom) Emily Appleton (United States) Julia Adams	(France) Margaux Komano (Poland) Oliwia Kadzielska (Slovakia) Mia Chudejová (Poland) Jessica Laura Pabisiak
August 31	Grodzisk Mazowiecki, Poland; Hard; W15; Singles and doubles draws	(Poland) Daria Gorska (Ukraine) Kateryna Lazarenko; 6–3, 6–4	(United States) Ava Hrastar (United States) Kate Sharabura	(United Kingdom) Emily Appleton (United States) Julia Adams	(France) Margaux Komano (Poland) Oliwia Kadzielska (Slovakia) Mia Chudejová (Poland) Jessica Laura Pabisiak
August 31	Pécs, Hungary; Clay; W15; Singles and doubles draws	(Italy) Enola Chiesa; 4–6, 6–3, 6–4	(Slovakia) Karolína Mráziková	(Slovenia) Alja Senica (Germany) Franziska Sziedat	(Canada) Ana Grubor (Hungary) Melinda Bíró (Bulgaria) Viktoria Veleva (Slovakia) Anika Jašková
August 31	Pécs, Hungary; Clay; W15; Singles and doubles draws	(Hungary) Luca Kalman (Hungary) Anna Mihálka; 6–4, 2–6, [10–7]	(Romania) Patricia Georgiana Goina (France) Helena Stevic	(Slovenia) Alja Senica (Germany) Franziska Sziedat	(Canada) Ana Grubor (Hungary) Melinda Bíró (Bulgaria) Viktoria Veleva (Slovakia) Anika Jašková
August 31	Brașov, Romania; Clay; W15; Singles and doubles draws	(Romania) Alesia Breaz; 3–6, 6–2, 6–1	(Ukraine) Daria Lopatetska	(Romania) Simona Ogescu (Italy) Angelica Raggi	(Romania) Karina Elena Gabriela Dumitru (Italy) Serena Paris (Romania) Cristiana Nicoleta Todoni (Romania) Alexia-Shara Iancu
August 31	Brașov, Romania; Clay; W15; Singles and doubles draws	(Romania) Alesia Breaz (Romania) Cristiana Nicoleta Todoni; 6–7^{(5–7)}, 6–3, [10–6]	(Romania) Simona Ogescu (Romania) Ana Ioana Vârșa	(Romania) Simona Ogescu (Italy) Angelica Raggi	(Romania) Karina Elena Gabriela Dumitru (Italy) Serena Paris (Romania) Cristiana Nicoleta Todoni (Romania) Alexia-Shara Iancu
August 31	Hurghada, Egypt; Hard; W15; Singles and doubles draws	(Egypt) Yasmin Ezzat; 4–6, 6–3, 6–1	Yuliya Perapekhina	Elina Nepliy (Denmark) Sarafina Olivia Hansen	(France) Laïa Petretic; Mariia Tkacheva (Ukraine) Kateryna Diatlova (South Africa) Wozuko Mdlulwa
August 31	Hurghada, Egypt; Hard; W15; Singles and doubles draws	(Egypt) Hania Abouelsaad; Margarita Betova; 6–3, 3–6, [10–3]	(France) Laïa Petretic (Luxembourg) Marie Weckerle	Elina Nepliy (Denmark) Sarafina Olivia Hansen	(France) Laïa Petretic; Mariia Tkacheva (Ukraine) Kateryna Diatlova (South Africa) Wozuko Mdlulwa
August 31	Monastir, Tunisia; Hard; W15; Singles and doubles draws	(United States) Carolyn Ansari; 6–4, 7–5	(New Zealand) Elyse Tse	(Finland) Clarissa Blomqvist (United States) Sofia Rojas	(Germany) Johanna Silva (Japan) Riko Kikawada (France) Marie Villet (United Kingdom) Savannah Dada-Mascoll
August 31	Monastir, Tunisia; Hard; W15; Singles and doubles draws	(Finland) Clarissa Blomqvist (Canada) Alexandra Vagramov; 7–6^{(7–5)}, 6–2	(United States) Carolyn Ansari (United Kingdom) Savannah Dada-Mascoll	(Finland) Clarissa Blomqvist (United States) Sofia Rojas	(Germany) Johanna Silva (Japan) Riko Kikawada (France) Marie Villet (United Kingdom) Savannah Dada-Mascoll
August 31	Porto Velho, Brazil; Hard; W15; Singles and doubles draws	(Mexico) Ana Sofía Sánchez; 6–3, 6–3	(Brazil) Ana Candiotto	(Brazil) Júlia Konishi Camargo Silva (Israel) Maayan Laron	(Colombia) Valentina Mediorreal (Brazil) Ana Cruz; Alisa Danilova (Colombia) María José Sánchez Uribe
August 31	Porto Velho, Brazil; Hard; W15; Singles and doubles draws	(Colombia) Valentina Mediorreal (Mexico) Ana Sofía Sánchez; 6–3, 6–4	(Brazil) Letícia Garcia Vidal (Brazil) Catarina Melleiro	(Brazil) Júlia Konishi Camargo Silva (Israel) Maayan Laron	(Colombia) Valentina Mediorreal (Brazil) Ana Cruz; Alisa Danilova (Colombia) María José Sánchez Uribe
August 31	Luján, Argentina; Clay; W15; Singles and doubles draws	(Argentina) Victoria Bosio; 6–4, 4–6, 7–6^{(7–4)}	(Argentina) María Florencia Urrutia	(Venezuela) Sofía Cabezas Domínguez (Chile) Fernanda Labraña	(Ecuador) Camila Romero (Chile) Jimar Gerald González (Argentina) Lourdes Ayala (Argentina) Luciana Moyano
August 31	Luján, Argentina; Clay; W15; Singles and doubles draws	(Venezuela) Sofía Cabezas Domínguez (Mexico) María Fernanda Navarro Oliva; 6–2, 3–6, [10–5]	(Argentina) Luciana Moyano (Ecuador) Camila Romero	(Venezuela) Sofía Cabezas Domínguez (Chile) Fernanda Labraña	(Ecuador) Camila Romero (Chile) Jimar Gerald González (Argentina) Lourdes Ayala (Argentina) Luciana Moyano

=== September ===
Week of	Tournament	Winner	Runners-up	Semifinalists	Quarterfinalists
September 7	Guiyang, China; Hard; W50; Singles and doubles draws	Alexandra Shubladze; 6–2, 6–3	(China) Ren Yufei	Daria Khomutsianskaya (Australia) Tahlia Kokkinis	(United States) Hina Inoue; Darya Astakhova (China) Yao Xinxin (China) Shi Han
September 7	Guiyang, China; Hard; W50; Singles and doubles draws	(China) Guo Meiqi (China) Yang Yidi; 4–6, 6–3, [10–8]	(Japan) Hiroko Kuwata (Japan) Eri Shimizu	Daria Khomutsianskaya (Australia) Tahlia Kokkinis	(United States) Hina Inoue; Darya Astakhova (China) Yao Xinxin (China) Shi Han
September 7	Évora, Portugal; Hard; W50; Singles and doubles draws	(Portugal) Matilde Jorge; 7–5, 6–4	Anastasia Gasanova	(United Kingdom) Sofia Johnson (Japan) Aoi Ito	(Canada) Kayla Cross (United Kingdom) Katie Swan (Portugal) Francisca Jorge (Portugal) Angelina Voloshchuk
September 7	Évora, Portugal; Hard; W50; Singles and doubles draws	(Canada) Ariana Arseneault (Canada) Raphaëlle Lacasse; 6–3, 6–4	(Slovakia) Katarína Kužmová (Australia) Elena Micic	(United Kingdom) Sofia Johnson (Japan) Aoi Ito	(Canada) Kayla Cross (United Kingdom) Katie Swan (Portugal) Francisca Jorge (Portugal) Angelina Voloshchuk
September 7	Reus, Spain; Clay; W35; Singles and doubles draws	(Spain) Lucía Cortez Llorca; 6–7^{(5–7)}, 6–4, 6–1	(Spain) Ariana Geerlings	(Greece) Marianna Argyrokastriti (Italy) Francesca Pace	(Ukraine) Daria Yesypchuk (Italy) Matilde Paoletti (France) Amandine Hesse (Spain) Carlota Martínez Círez
September 7	Reus, Spain; Clay; W35; Singles and doubles draws	(Spain) Lucía Cortez Llorca (Germany) Joëlle Steur; 6–4, 6–1	(Sweden) Caijsa Hennemann (Latvia) Beatrise Zeltiņa	(Greece) Marianna Argyrokastriti (Italy) Francesca Pace	(Ukraine) Daria Yesypchuk (Italy) Matilde Paoletti (France) Amandine Hesse (Spain) Carlota Martínez Círez
September 7	Yeongwol, South Korea; Hard; W15; Singles and doubles draws	(South Korea) Kim Yu-jin; 7–6^{(8–6)}, 6–3	(South Korea) Kim Da-bin	(Chinese Taipei) Tsao Chia-yi (South Korea) Lee Ha-eum	(Japan) Kanon Sawashiro (Thailand) Thasaporn Naklo (Japan) Kisa Yoshioka (South Korea) Choi Seo-yun
September 7	Yeongwol, South Korea; Hard; W15; Singles and doubles draws	(South Korea) Kim Da-bin (South Korea) Kim Na-ri; 7–5, 3–6, [10–1]	(South Korea) Choi Seo-yun (South Korea) Lee Ha-eum	(Chinese Taipei) Tsao Chia-yi (South Korea) Lee Ha-eum	(Japan) Kanon Sawashiro (Thailand) Thasaporn Naklo (Japan) Kisa Yoshioka (South Korea) Choi Seo-yun
September 7	Dijon, France; Clay; W15; Singles and doubles draws	(France) Sarah Iliev; 2–6, 6–2, 6–3	(France) Daphnée Mpetshi Perricard	(Spain) Marta Soriano Santiago (Netherlands) Lian Tran	(Germany) Gina Dittmann (Latvia) Diāna Marcinkēviča (France) Marie Mattel (Switzerland) Sophie Luescher
September 7	Dijon, France; Clay; W15; Singles and doubles draws	(France) Marie Mattel (Netherlands) Demi Tran; 6–2, 6–2	(France) Sophia Biolay (France) Sarah Iliev	(Spain) Marta Soriano Santiago (Netherlands) Lian Tran	(Germany) Gina Dittmann (Latvia) Diāna Marcinkēviča (France) Marie Mattel (Switzerland) Sophie Luescher
September 7	Viserba, Italy; Clay; W15; Singles and doubles draws	(Italy) Marta Lombardini; 6–1, 7–5	(Germany) Eva Marie Voracek	(Italy) Angelica Raggi (Germany) Anne Schäfer	(Georgia (country)) Sofia Shapatava (Italy) Sveva Fumagalli (Latvia) Elza Tomase (Italy) Eleonora Alvisi
September 7	Viserba, Italy; Clay; W15; Singles and doubles draws	(Norway) Astrid Brune Olsen (Slovenia) Kristina Novak; 4–6, 6–1, [10–4]	(Czech Republic) Veronika Kulhavá (Italy) Federica Trevisan	(Italy) Angelica Raggi (Germany) Anne Schäfer	(Georgia (country)) Sofia Shapatava (Italy) Sveva Fumagalli (Latvia) Elza Tomase (Italy) Eleonora Alvisi
September 7	Radom, Poland; Clay; W15; Singles and doubles draws	(Czech Republic) Lucie Petruzelová; 3–6, 6–3, 6–4	(United States) Julia Adams	(Poland) Anna Kmiecik (Czech Republic) Amy Suchá	(Poland) Sara Husar (Italy) Enola Chiesa (Slovakia) Laura Svatíková (Poland) Zuzanna Bednarz
September 7	Radom, Poland; Clay; W15; Singles and doubles draws	(Poland) Oriana Gniewkowska (Germany) Annemarie Lazar; 7–5, 6–3	(Poland) Karolina Golda (Poland) Barbara Straszewska	(Poland) Anna Kmiecik (Czech Republic) Amy Suchá	(Poland) Sara Husar (Italy) Enola Chiesa (Slovakia) Laura Svatíková (Poland) Zuzanna Bednarz
September 7	Câmpulung, Romania; Clay; W15; Singles and doubles draws	(Romania) Giulia Safina Popa; 4–6, 6–2, 6–3	(Hungary) Melinda Bíró	(Romania) Ștefania Bojică (Romania) Cristiana Todoni	(Greece) Sapfo Sakellaridi (Romania) Patricia Georgiana Goina (Romania) Georgia Crăciun (Bulgaria) Valeria Garnevska
September 7	Câmpulung, Romania; Clay; W15; Singles and doubles draws	(Romania) Ștefania Bojică (Romania) Anastasia Safta; 6–0, 4–6, [10–7]	(Romania) Alesia Breaz (Romania) Cristiana Todoni	(Romania) Ștefania Bojică (Romania) Cristiana Todoni	(Greece) Sapfo Sakellaridi (Romania) Patricia Georgiana Goina (Romania) Georgia Crăciun (Bulgaria) Valeria Garnevska
September 7	Hurghada, Egypt; Hard; W15; Singles and doubles draws	(Egypt) Yasmin Ezzat; 7–6^{(7–3)}, 6–2	(South Africa) Wozuko Mdlulwa	Yuliya Perapekhina (Fiji) Saoirse Breen	(Turkey) Selina Atay; Margarita Betova (Sweden) Iva Marinkovic (France) Alyssa Réguer
September 7	Hurghada, Egypt; Hard; W15; Singles and doubles draws	(Colombia) María Herazo (Italy) Federica Sacco; 6–4, 6–3	(Egypt) Yasmin Ezzat (France) Laïa Petretic	Yuliya Perapekhina (Fiji) Saoirse Breen	(Turkey) Selina Atay; Margarita Betova (Sweden) Iva Marinkovic (France) Alyssa Réguer
September 7	Monastir, Tunisia; Hard; W15; Singles and doubles draws	(United Kingdom) Imogen Haddad; 7–6^{(7–4)}, 4–1 ret.	(Lithuania) Andrė Lukošiūtė	(France) Astrid Cirotte (Japan) Riko Kikawada	(United States) Carolyn Ansari; Kristina Belkova (Spain) María Oliver Sánchez (France) Yasmine Mansouri
September 7	Monastir, Tunisia; Hard; W15; Singles and doubles draws	(United Kingdom) Savannah Dada-Mascoll (Kazakhstan) Yekaterina Dmitrichenko; 6–4, 6–7^{(4–7)}, [10–8]	(Turkey) Doğa Türkmen (Canada) Alexandra Vagramov	(France) Astrid Cirotte (Japan) Riko Kikawada	(United States) Carolyn Ansari; Kristina Belkova (Spain) María Oliver Sánchez (France) Yasmine Mansouri
September 7	Pilar, Argentina; Clay; W15; Singles and doubles draws	(Venezuela) Sofía Cabezas Domínguez; 6–0, 6–4	(Argentina) Lourdes Ayala	(Ecuador) Camila Romero (Argentina) Luna María Cinalli	(Argentina) Josefina Estévez (Argentina) Ana Victoria Gobbi Monllau (Argentina) María Florencia Urrutia (Paraguay) Leyla Brítez Risso
September 7	Pilar, Argentina; Clay; W15; Singles and doubles draws	(Venezuela) Sofía Cabezas Domínguez (Mexico) María Fernanda Navarro Oliva; 6–3, 6–3	(Argentina) Luciana Moyano (Ecuador) Camila Romero	(Ecuador) Camila Romero (Argentina) Luna María Cinalli	(Argentina) Josefina Estévez (Argentina) Ana Victoria Gobbi Monllau (Argentina) María Florencia Urrutia (Paraguay) Leyla Brítez Risso
September 14	Le Neubourg Open International; Le Neubourg, France; Hard; W75; Singles and doubles draws	(Czech Republic) Anna Sisková; 4–6, 6–2, 7–6^{(7–3)}	(United States) Fiona Crawley	(Ukraine) Veronika Podrez (France) Manon Léonard	(Greece) Martha Matoula (France) Diana Martynov; Julia Avdeeva (Poland) Martyna Kubka
September 14	Le Neubourg Open International; Le Neubourg, France; Hard; W75; Singles and doubles draws	(United Kingdom) Naiktha Bains (India) Sahaja Yamalapalli; 3–6, 6–4, [11–9]	(Poland) Martyna Kubka (Czech Republic) Anna Sisková	(Ukraine) Veronika Podrez (France) Manon Léonard	(Greece) Martha Matoula (France) Diana Martynov; Julia Avdeeva (Poland) Martyna Kubka
September 14	Pazardzhik Cup; Pazardzhik, Bulgaria; Clay; W50; Singles and doubles draws	(Bulgaria) Elizara Yaneva; 6–3, 6–7^{(1–7)}, 7–6^{(7–5)}	(Netherlands) Loes Ebeling Koning	(Turkey) İpek Öz (Sweden) Caijsa Hennemann	(United States) Julia Adams (Bulgaria) Lia Karatancheva (Bulgaria) Lidia Encheva (Greece) Elena Korokozidi
September 14	Pazardzhik Cup; Pazardzhik, Bulgaria; Clay; W50; Singles and doubles draws	(Romania) Oana Gavrilă (Greece) Sapfo Sakellaridi; 6–4, 6–4	(United States) Julia Adams (Netherlands) Merel Hoedt	(Turkey) İpek Öz (Sweden) Caijsa Hennemann	(United States) Julia Adams (Bulgaria) Lia Karatancheva (Bulgaria) Lidia Encheva (Greece) Elena Korokozidi
September 14	Kyoto, Japan; Hard (i); W35; Singles and doubles draws	(Japan) Hiromi Abe; 3–6, 6–3, 7–6^{(7–5)}	(China) Lu Jiajing	(Japan) Rinko Matsuda (Japan) Ena Shibahara	(Japan) Natsumi Kawaguchi (Japan) Sayaka Ishii (Japan) Eri Shimizu (Japan) Natsuki Yoshimoto
September 14	Kyoto, Japan; Hard (i); W35; Singles and doubles draws	(Japan) Hiromi Abe (United Kingdom) Amelia Rajecki; 3–6, 6–2, [10–7]	(Japan) Sayaka Ishii (Japan) Kanon Sawashiro	(Japan) Rinko Matsuda (Japan) Ena Shibahara	(Japan) Natsumi Kawaguchi (Japan) Sayaka Ishii (Japan) Eri Shimizu (Japan) Natsuki Yoshimoto
September 14	Shenyang, China; Hard (i); W35; Singles and doubles draws	Kristiana Sidorova; 6–4, 7–6^{(12–10)}	(China) Wei Sijia	(China) Huang Yujia (China) Zhang Ruien	(China) Ren Yufei; Daria Khomutsianskaya (China) Zheng Wushuang (China) Yang Yidi
September 14	Shenyang, China; Hard (i); W35; Singles and doubles draws	(China) Wei Sijia (China) Yuan Chengyiyi; 3–6, 6–2, [10–8]	(China) Huang Yujia (Indonesia) Priska Nugroho	(China) Huang Yujia (China) Zhang Ruien	(China) Ren Yufei; Daria Khomutsianskaya (China) Zheng Wushuang (China) Yang Yidi
September 14	Santa Margherita di Pula, Italy; Clay; W35; Singles and doubles draws	(Czech Republic) Alisa Oktiabreva; 6–1, 4–6, 6–3	(Italy) Marta Lombardini	(Germany) Franziska Sziedat (Italy) Ilary Pistola	(Italy) Camilla Gennaro (Italy) Matilde Paoletti (France) Océane Babel (Italy) Viola Turini
September 14	Santa Margherita di Pula, Italy; Clay; W35; Singles and doubles draws	(Romania) Briana Szabó (Ukraine) Daria Yesypchuk; 6–1, 3–6, [10–6]	(Germany) Laura Boehner (Germany) Franziska Sziedat	(Germany) Franziska Sziedat (Italy) Ilary Pistola	(Italy) Camilla Gennaro (Italy) Matilde Paoletti (France) Océane Babel (Italy) Viola Turini
September 14	Hurghada, Egypt; Hard; W35; Singles and doubles draws	(Austria) Ekaterina Perelygina; 6–2, 6–4	Ekaterina Tupitsyna	(Poland) Zuzanna Pawlikowska (Slovakia) Katarína Kužmová	(France) Laïa Petretic (Germany) Ann Akasha Ceuca (Serbia) Elena Milovanović (United Kingdom) Emily Appleton
September 14	Hurghada, Egypt; Hard; W35; Singles and doubles draws	Elina Nepliy; Mariia Tkacheva; 6–3, 6–2	(Colombia) María Herazo (Italy) Federica Sacco	(Poland) Zuzanna Pawlikowska (Slovakia) Katarína Kužmová	(France) Laïa Petretic (Germany) Ann Akasha Ceuca (Serbia) Elena Milovanović (United Kingdom) Emily Appleton
September 14	Monastir, Tunisia; Hard; W15; Singles and doubles draws	(Kazakhstan) Yekaterina Dmitrichenko; 6–3, 6–2	(Italy) Matilde Mariani	(China) Mi Lan (Italy) Lavinia Luciano	(Lithuania) Iveta Dapkutė; Miroslava Medvedeva (Netherlands) Florentine Dekkers (Japan) Nanari Katsumi
September 14	Monastir, Tunisia; Hard; W15; Singles and doubles draws	(Finland) Clarissa Blomqvist (Lithuania) Andrė Lukošiūtė; 7–6^{(7–4)}, 0–6, [10–8]	(Turkey) İrem Kurt (China) Mi Lan	(China) Mi Lan (Italy) Lavinia Luciano	(Lithuania) Iveta Dapkutė; Miroslava Medvedeva (Netherlands) Florentine Dekkers (Japan) Nanari Katsumi
September 14	São Luís, Brazil; Clay; W15; Singles and doubles draws	(Paraguay) Leyla Brítez Risso; 6–1, 6–1	(United States) Ava Catanzarite	(Brazil) Júlia Konishi Camargo Silva (Argentina) Josefina Estévez	(Brazil) Catarina Melleiro (Brazil) Beatriz Nahmias Melo Rodrigues (Brazil) Jennifer Dourado (Brazil) Letícia Garcia Vidal
September 14	São Luís, Brazil; Clay; W15; Singles and doubles draws	(Paraguay) Leyla Brítez Risso (Argentina) Josefina Estévez; 7–6^{(10–8)}, 6–1	(Brazil) Bianca Mendonca Bernardes (Brazil) Jennifer Dourado	(Brazil) Júlia Konishi Camargo Silva (Argentina) Josefina Estévez	(Brazil) Catarina Melleiro (Brazil) Beatriz Nahmias Melo Rodrigues (Brazil) Jennifer Dourado (Brazil) Letícia Garcia Vidal
September 21	Nanao, Japan; Carpet; W50; Singles and doubles draws	(Japan) Hiromi Abe; 6–4, 6–3	(Japan) Sakura Hosogi	(Japan) Michika Ozeki (Japan) Sayaka Ishii	(Japan) Hikaru Sato (Sweden) Tiana Tian Deng (Japan) Rion Itaya (Japan) Eri Shimizu
September 21	Nanao, Japan; Carpet; W50; Singles and doubles draws	(Japan) Ayumi Miyamoto (Japan) Kisa Yoshioka; 2–6, 6–4, [15–13]	(Japan) Hiromi Abe (Japan) Ikumi Yamazaki	(Japan) Michika Ozeki (Japan) Sayaka Ishii	(Japan) Hikaru Sato (Sweden) Tiana Tian Deng (Japan) Rion Itaya (Japan) Eri Shimizu
September 21	Yecla, Spain; Hard; W50; Singles and doubles draws	(Spain) Charo Esquiva Bañuls; 6–3, 6–2	(Spain) Carmen Gallardo Guevara	(Ukraine) Kateryna Lazarenko (Spain) Ángela Fita Boluda	(France) Tiphanie Lemaître (France) Nahia Berecoechea (Spain) Georgina García Pérez; Kira Pavlova
September 21	Yecla, Spain; Hard; W50; Singles and doubles draws	(Spain) Georgina García Pérez (Serbia) Elena Milovanović; 2–6, 6–4, [12–10]	(United States) Carson Tanguilig (Latvia) Elza Tomase	(Ukraine) Kateryna Lazarenko (Spain) Ángela Fita Boluda	(France) Tiphanie Lemaître (France) Nahia Berecoechea (Spain) Georgina García Pérez; Kira Pavlova
September 21	Plovdiv, Bulgaria; Clay; W50; Singles and doubles draws	(Spain) Ane Mintegi del Olmo; 2–6, 6–1, 6–3	(Bulgaria) Elizara Yaneva	(Sweden) Caijsa Hennemann (Netherlands) Loes Ebeling Koning	(Bulgaria) Lidia Encheva (Serbia) Anja Stanković (Romania) Ilinca Amariei (Italy) Alessandra Mazzola
September 21	Plovdiv, Bulgaria; Clay; W50; Singles and doubles draws	(Romania) Oana Gavrilă (Greece) Sapfo Sakellaridi; 6–0, 7–6^{(7–2)}	(Sweden) Caijsa Hennemann (Sweden) Nellie Taraba Wallberg	(Sweden) Caijsa Hennemann (Netherlands) Loes Ebeling Koning	(Bulgaria) Lidia Encheva (Serbia) Anja Stanković (Romania) Ilinca Amariei (Italy) Alessandra Mazzola
September 21	Berkeley Tennis Club Challenge; Berkeley, United States; Hard; W50; Singles and doubles draws	(United States) Kayla Day; 7–5, 6–4	(United States) Janae Preston	(United Kingdom) Ella McDonald (Peru) Lucciana Pérez Alarcón	(United States) Anna Rogers (United States) Madison Brengle (Denmark) Emma Kamper (United States) Hanna Chang
September 21	Berkeley Tennis Club Challenge; Berkeley, United States; Hard; W50; Singles and doubles draws	(Venezuela) Sofía Cabezas Domínguez (United States) Katherine Hui; 3–6, 6–4, [10–7]	(Japan) Reina Goto; Evialina Laskevich	(United Kingdom) Ella McDonald (Peru) Lucciana Pérez Alarcón	(United States) Anna Rogers (United States) Madison Brengle (Denmark) Emma Kamper (United States) Hanna Chang
September 21	Santa Margherita di Pula, Italy; Clay; W35; Singles and doubles draws	(Czech Republic) Alisa Oktiabreva; 7–5, 6–3	(Czech Republic) Alena Kovačková	(Switzerland) Marie Mettraux (Italy) Vittoria Paganetti	(Italy) Denise Valente (Croatia) Tena Lukas (Italy) Camilla Gennaro (Italy) Martina Colmegna
September 21	Santa Margherita di Pula, Italy; Clay; W35; Singles and doubles draws	(Czech Republic) Alena Kovačková (Germany) Joëlle Steur; 6–3, 6–1	(Kenya) Angella Okutoyi (Ukraine) Daria Yesypchuk	(Switzerland) Marie Mettraux (Italy) Vittoria Paganetti	(Italy) Denise Valente (Croatia) Tena Lukas (Italy) Camilla Gennaro (Italy) Martina Colmegna
September 21	Sharm El Sheikh, Egypt; Hard; W35; Singles and doubles draws	Maria Golovina; 6–2, 6–4	Yuliya Hatouka	(Poland) Zuzanna Pawlikowska; Victoria Milovanova	(United Kingdom) Esther Adeshina (Germany) Mara Guth; Ulyana Hrabavets (Egypt) Sandra Samir
September 21	Sharm El Sheikh, Egypt; Hard; W35; Singles and doubles draws	Anna Sedysheva; Ksenia Smirnova; 6–7^{(3–7)}, 6–4, [10–5]	(United Kingdom) Esther Adeshina (Poland) Zuzanna Pawlikowska	(Poland) Zuzanna Pawlikowska; Victoria Milovanova	(United Kingdom) Esther Adeshina (Germany) Mara Guth; Ulyana Hrabavets (Egypt) Sandra Samir
September 21	Maanshan, China; Hard; W15; Singles and doubles draws	Anna Kubareva; 2–6, 7–6^{(7–3)}, 7–5	(China) Wang Yuhan	Daria Khomutsianskaya (China) Jiang Zijun	(China) Zhang Ruien (China) Sun Yingqun (China) Ye Shiyu (China) Li Xiaowei
September 21	Maanshan, China; Hard; W15; Singles and doubles draws	(China) Chen Mengyi (China) Wang Yuhan; 6–0, 6–7^{(5–7)}, [12–10]	(China) Hou Yanan (China) Zhang Ruien	Daria Khomutsianskaya (China) Jiang Zijun	(China) Zhang Ruien (China) Sun Yingqun (China) Ye Shiyu (China) Li Xiaowei
September 21	Constanța, Romania; Clay; W15; Singles and doubles draws	(Romania) Giulia Safina Popa; 6–3, 6–1	(Romania) Alesia Breaz	(Romania) Cristiana Todoni (Germany) Anne Schäfer	(Romania) Andreea Prisăcariu (Czech Republic) Linda Ševčíková (Colombia) María Herazo (Romania) Maia Ilinca Burcescu
September 21	Constanța, Romania; Clay; W15; Singles and doubles draws	(Romania) Alesia Breaz (Romania) Cristiana Todoni; 3–6, 6–2, [10–4]	(Colombia) María Herazo (Czech Republic) Linda Ševčíková	(Romania) Cristiana Todoni (Germany) Anne Schäfer	(Romania) Andreea Prisăcariu (Czech Republic) Linda Ševčíková (Colombia) María Herazo (Romania) Maia Ilinca Burcescu
September 21	Monastir, Tunisia; Hard; W15; Singles and doubles draws	Ekaterina Dotsenko; 6–4, 6–7^{(5–7)}, 2–0 ret.	(Canada) Ellie Daniels	Kristina Kroitor; Kseniia Ruchkina	(China) Mi Lan (United Kingdom) Eliz Maloney (France) Astrid Cirotte (Turkey) İrem Kurt
September 21	Monastir, Tunisia; Hard; W15; Singles and doubles draws	(France) Ophélie Boullay; Kseniia Ruchkina; 6–2, 6–1	(Spain) María Oliver Sánchez (Italy) Marzia Paola Marina Pieragostini	Kristina Kroitor; Kseniia Ruchkina	(China) Mi Lan (United Kingdom) Eliz Maloney (France) Astrid Cirotte (Turkey) İrem Kurt
September 21	Belém, Brazil; Hard; W15; Singles and doubles draws	(Brazil) Letícia Garcia Vidal; 6–1, 4–6, 6–3	(United States) Paola Lopez	(Australia) Astra Sharma (Argentina) Josefina Estévez	(Mexico) Ana Sofía Sánchez (Argentina) Luna María Cinalli (Brazil) Jennifer Dourado (Brazil) Júlia Konishi Camargo Silva
September 21	Belém, Brazil; Hard; W15; Singles and doubles draws	(Brazil) Sabrina Dias (Brazil) Letícia Garcia Vidal; 6–4, 7–5	(Brazil) Bianca Mendonca Bernardes (Brazil) Jennifer Dourado	(Australia) Astra Sharma (Argentina) Josefina Estévez	(Mexico) Ana Sofía Sánchez (Argentina) Luna María Cinalli (Brazil) Jennifer Dourado (Brazil) Júlia Konishi Camargo Silva
September 28	Central Coast Pro Tennis Open; Templeton, United States; Hard; W100; Singles and doubles draws	(Germany) Tatjana Maria; 6–3, 6–4	(United States) Madison Brengle	(United Kingdom) Ella McDonald (United States) Julieta Pareja	(United States) Malaika Rapolu (United States) Kristina Penickova (Belgium) Amélie van Impe (United States) Caroline Dolehide
September 28	Central Coast Pro Tennis Open; Templeton, United States; Hard; W100; Singles and doubles draws	(United States) Savannah Broadus (United States) Allura Zamarripa; 7–5, 6–2	(United States) Whitney Osuigwe (United States) Akasha Urhobo	(United Kingdom) Ella McDonald (United States) Julieta Pareja	(United States) Malaika Rapolu (United States) Kristina Penickova (Belgium) Amélie van Impe (United States) Caroline Dolehide
September 28	The Campus Open; Quinta do Lago, Portugal; Hard; W75; Singles and doubles draws	(Italy) Lisa Pigato; 1–6, 6–0, 6–3	(Netherlands) Eva Vedder	(United Kingdom) Katie Swan (France) Margaux Rouvroy	(Slovenia) Polona Hercog (United Kingdom) Alicia Dudeney (Portugal) Francisca Jorge (Switzerland) Susan Bandecchi
September 28	The Campus Open; Quinta do Lago, Portugal; Hard; W75; Singles and doubles draws	(United States) Ayana Akli (United States) Reese Brantmeier; 7–5, 6–4	(United States) Kylie Collins (United States) Carson Tanguilig	(United Kingdom) Katie Swan (France) Margaux Rouvroy	(Slovenia) Polona Hercog (United Kingdom) Alicia Dudeney (Portugal) Francisca Jorge (Switzerland) Susan Bandecchi
September 28	Wagga Wagga, Australia; Hard; W35; Singles and doubles draws	(Japan) Naho Sato; 6–3, 6–3	(Japan) Mio Mushika	(Japan) Mutsumi Uemura (Japan) Kanon Sawashiro	(Australia) Ashleigh Simes (Japan) Yuno Kitahara (Japan) Nagi Hanatani (Japan) Hikaru Sato
September 28	Wagga Wagga, Australia; Hard; W35; Singles and doubles draws	(Australia) Amy Stevens (Australia) Belle Thompson; 2–6, 6–3, [10–8]	(Japan) Haruna Arakawa (New Zealand) Elyse Tse	(Japan) Mutsumi Uemura (Japan) Kanon Sawashiro	(Australia) Ashleigh Simes (Japan) Yuno Kitahara (Japan) Nagi Hanatani (Japan) Hikaru Sato
September 28	Baza, Spain; Hard; W35; Singles and doubles draws	(Spain) Charo Esquiva Bañuls; 6–0, 6–2	(New Zealand) Valentina Ivanov	(France) Amandine Hesse (Spain) Celia Cerviño Ruiz	(Canada) Cadence Brace (Switzerland) Valentina Ryser (France) Nahia Berecoechea (Spain) Julia Giaccio
September 28	Baza, Spain; Hard; W35; Singles and doubles draws	(Serbia) Elena Milovanović (Slovenia) Kristina Novak; 6–1, 6–0	(Finland) Laura Hietaranta (Slovakia) Radka Zelníčková	(France) Amandine Hesse (Spain) Celia Cerviño Ruiz	(Canada) Cadence Brace (Switzerland) Valentina Ryser (France) Nahia Berecoechea (Spain) Julia Giaccio
September 28	Reims, France; Hard (i); W35; Singles and doubles draws	(Netherlands) Britt du Pree; Walkover	(Netherlands) Isis Louise van den Broek	(Burundi) Sada Nahimana (France) Salma Djoubri	(France) Diana Martynov (France) Manon Léonard (Germany) Tessa Brockmann (Italy) Isabella Maria Șerban
September 28	Reims, France; Hard (i); W35; Singles and doubles draws	(South Korea) Im Hee-rae (South Korea) Kim Eun-chae; 6–4, 6–4	(Belgium) Kaat Coppez (Netherlands) Lian Tran	(Burundi) Sada Nahimana (France) Salma Djoubri	(France) Diana Martynov (France) Manon Léonard (Germany) Tessa Brockmann (Italy) Isabella Maria Șerban
September 28	Maanshan, China; Hard; W15; Singles and doubles draws	(South Korea) Lee Ha-eum; 4–6, 6–1, 7–5	(China) Luo Xi	(China) Sun Yingqun (China) Jiang Zijun	(China) Ren Ke (China) Xu Jiayu (South Korea) Son Ha-yoon (Singapore) Eva Marie Desvignes
September 28	Maanshan, China; Hard; W15; Singles and doubles draws	(China) Liu Leyi (China) Sun Yingqun; 6–4, 7–6^{(7–3)}	(China) Chen Mengyi (China) Luo Xi	(China) Sun Yingqun (China) Jiang Zijun	(China) Ren Ke (China) Xu Jiayu (South Korea) Son Ha-yoon (Singapore) Eva Marie Desvignes
September 28	Varna, Bulgaria; Clay; W15; Singles and doubles draws	(Romania) Giulia Safina Popa; 6–2, 6–3	(Germany) Sonja Zhenikhova	Felitsata Dorofeeva-Rybas (Greece) Sapfo Sakellaridi	(Norway) Astrid Brune Olsen (Croatia) Tara Würth (Romania) Oana Georgeta Simion (Bulgaria) Valeria Garnevska
September 28	Varna, Bulgaria; Clay; W15; Singles and doubles draws	(Romania) Bianca Bărbulescu (Norway) Astrid Brune Olsen; 6–1, 6–2	Maria Andrienko (Romania) Patricia Georgiana Goina	Felitsata Dorofeeva-Rybas (Greece) Sapfo Sakellaridi	(Norway) Astrid Brune Olsen (Croatia) Tara Würth (Romania) Oana Georgeta Simion (Bulgaria) Valeria Garnevska
September 28	Sharm El Sheikh, Egypt; Hard; W15; Singles and doubles draws	Yuliya Hatouka; 6–4, 6–1	(Ukraine) Antonina Sushkova	(Netherlands) Jade Groen; Daria Zelinskaya	Ksenia Meshcheryakova; Ksenia Smirnova (Netherlands) Charlotte van Zonneveld (United Kingdom) Esther Adeshina
September 28	Sharm El Sheikh, Egypt; Hard; W15; Singles and doubles draws	Yuliya Hatouka; Daria Zelinskaya; 7–5, 6–3	(Austria) Leonie Rabl (Austria) Liel Marlies Rothensteiner	(Netherlands) Jade Groen; Daria Zelinskaya	Ksenia Meshcheryakova; Ksenia Smirnova (Netherlands) Charlotte van Zonneveld (United Kingdom) Esther Adeshina
September 28	Monastir, Tunisia; Hard; W15; Singles and doubles draws	Ekaterina Dotsenko; 6–3, 6–1	(France) Sophia Biolay	(China) Mi Lan (Spain) Marta Soriano Santiago	(Mexico) Jéssica Hinojosa Gómez (Italy) Valentina Losciale (France) Astrid Cirotte; Polina Berezina
September 28	Monastir, Tunisia; Hard; W15; Singles and doubles draws	(France) Sophia Biolay (France) Astrid Cirotte; 6–1, 7–6^{(7–4)}	(Italy) Anastasia Bertacchi (Italy) Carolina Dibenedetto	(China) Mi Lan (Spain) Marta Soriano Santiago	(Mexico) Jéssica Hinojosa Gómez (Italy) Valentina Losciale (France) Astrid Cirotte; Polina Berezina
September 28	Nashville, United States; Hard; W15; Singles and doubles draws	(Australia) Astra Sharma; 6–3, 6–1	(Netherlands) Rose Marie Nijkamp	(Egypt) Merna Refaat (United States) Ashton Bowers	(United States) Carlota Moreno (Denmark) Emma Kamper (Argentina) Chiara Di Genova (United States) Ashley Lahey
September 28	Nashville, United States; Hard; W15; Singles and doubles draws	(United Kingdom) Erin Pearce (United States) Mia Yamakita; 1–6, 6–2, [10–8]	(Denmark) Emma Kamper (South Africa) Isabella Kruger	(Egypt) Merna Refaat (United States) Ashton Bowers	(United States) Carlota Moreno (Denmark) Emma Kamper (Argentina) Chiara Di Genova (United States) Ashley Lahey
September 28	Trelew, Argentina; Hard; W15; Singles and doubles draws	(Paraguay) Leyla Brítez Risso; 6–4, 6–4	(Mexico) Ana Sofía Sánchez	(Argentina) Luciana Moyano (Argentina) María Florencia Urrutia	(Argentina) Lourdes Ayala (Argentina) Pilar Da Silva (United Kingdom) Liv Zingg (Argentina) Emily Zornada
September 28	Trelew, Argentina; Hard; W15; Singles and doubles draws	(Argentina) Sofía Meabe (Argentina) María Florencia Urrutia; 4–6, 6–3, [10–8]	(Argentina) Lourdes Ayala (Paraguay) Leyla Brítez Risso	(Argentina) Luciana Moyano (Argentina) María Florencia Urrutia	(Argentina) Lourdes Ayala (Argentina) Pilar Da Silva (United Kingdom) Liv Zingg (Argentina) Emily Zornada
