= 2026 Querétaro Open – Singles =

Singles
- 2026 Querétaro Open

Final
- Champion: (Canada) Bianca Andreescu
- Runner-up: (Germany) Tatjana Maria
- Score: 6–1, 2–6, 6–3

Details
- Draw: 32 (4 WC)
- Seeds: 8

Events
| Singles | Doubles |
- Querétaro Open

Bianca Andreescu won the title, after defeating Tatjana Maria 6–1, 2–6, 6–3 in the final.

Sára Bejlek was the reigning champion, but chose not to participate.

== Seeds ==
1. (Germany) Tatjana Maria (final)
2. (France) Léolia Jeanjean (first round)
3. (France) Fiona Ferro (semifinals)
4. (Canada) Bianca Andreescu (champion)
5. (Slovenia) Tamara Zidanšek (second round)
6. (Belgium) Sofia Costoulas (first round)
7. (Colombia) Emiliana Arango (first round)
8. (Argentina) Nadia Podoroska (quarterfinals)

== Draw ==
Key

- Q = Qualifier
- WC = Wild card
- LL = Lucky loser
- Alt = Alternate
- ITF = ITF entry
- PR = Protected ranking
- SR = Special ranking
- SE = Special exempt
- JE = Junior exempt
- JR = Junior Accelerator Programme entrant
- CO = College Accelerator Programme entrant
- NG = Next Gen Accelerator Program entrant
- w/o = Walkover
- r = Retired
- d = Defaulted

=== Finals ===
Semifinals
1 | (Germany) Tatjana Maria | 7 | 3 | 6
3 | (France) Fiona Ferro | 5 | 6 | 1
4 | (Canada) Bianca Andreescu | 6 | 7
(France) Carole Monnet | 3 | 5

Final
1 | (Germany) Tatjana Maria | 1 | 6 | 3
4 | (Canada) Bianca Andreescu | 6 | 2 | 6

=== Top half ===
First round
1 | (Germany) T Maria | 6 | 6
WC | (Mexico) C Garibay Romero | 0 | 0
(Italy) M Colmegna | 6 | 0 | 6
(Poland) Z Pawlikowska | 4 | 6 | 2
(Slovenia) P Hercog | 7^{7} | 7
(Argentina) M Capurro Taborda | 6^{4} | 5
Q | (Ukraine) V Strakhova | 6 | 6
6 | (Belgium) S Costoulas | 4 | 3
3 | (France) F Ferro | 7 | 1 | 6
(United Kingdom) S Johnson | 5 | 6 | 3
WC | (United States) A Reami | 6 | 6
(China) L Mi | 1 | 2
(France) S Janicijevic | 6 | 6
(Canada) A Grubor | 0 | 2
(United States) E Mandlik | 6 | 6
7 | (Colombia) E Arango | 4 | 4

Second round
1 | (Germany) T Maria | 6 | 7^{7}
(Italy) M Colmegna | 1 | 6^{5}
(Slovenia) P Hercog | 6 | 2 | 2
Q | (Ukraine) V Strakhova | 2 | 6 | 6
3 | (France) F Ferro | 6 | 6
WC | (United States) A Reami | 0 | 0
(France) S Janicijevic | 6 | 0 | 4
(United States) E Mandlik | 2 | 6 | 6

Quarterfinals
1 | (Germany) T Maria | 7^{7} | 6
Q | (Ukraine) V Strakhova | 6^{3} | 3
3 | (France) F Ferro | 6 | 6^{5} | 6
(United States) E Mandlik | 2 | 7^{7} | 4

Semifinals
1 | (Germany) T Maria | 7 | 3 | 6
3 | (France) F Ferro | 5 | 6 | 1

=== Bottom half ===
First round
5 | (Slovenia) T Zidanšek | 6 | 6
(United States) K Scott | 1 | 2
Q | (Mexico) V Rodríguez | 6^{2} | 0
(Spain) A Herrero Liñana | 7^{7} | 6
(Ecuador) M Reasco | 4 | 2
(Italy) D Cherubini | 6 | 6
WC | (United States) K Hui | 3 | 2
4 | (Canada) B Andreescu | 6 | 6
8 | (Argentina) N Podoroska | 6 | 6
(France) A Ramé | 4 | 3
Q | (Canada) D Plekhanova | 1 | 1
(Romania) M Bulgaru | 6 | 6
WC | (Mexico) M Gómez Pezuela Cano | 6^{3} | 6 | 4
Q | (Romania) CA Herea | 7^{7} | 3 | 6
(France) C Monnet | 6 | 6
2 | (France) L Jeanjean | 4 | 1

Second round
5 | (Slovenia) T Zidanšek | 7^{7} | 2 | 6^{3}
(Spain) A Herrero Liñana | 6^{3} | 6 | 7^{7}
(Italy) D Cherubini | 2 | 3
4 | (Canada) B Andreescu | 6 | 6
8 | (Argentina) N Podoroska | 6 | 6
(Romania) M Bulgaru | 1 | 1
Q | (Romania) CA Herea | 2 | 1
(France) C Monnet | 6 | 6

Quarterfinals
(Spain) A Herrero Liñana | 1 | 1
4 | (Canada) B Andreescu | 6 | 6
8 | (Argentina) N Podoroska | 6 | 3 | 2
(France) C Monnet | 2 | 6 | 6

Semifinals
4 | (Canada) B Andreescu | 6 | 7
(France) C Monnet | 3 | 5

== Qualifying ==
=== Seeds ===
1. (Romania) Carmen Andreea Herea (qualified)
2. (Ukraine) Valeriya Strakhova (qualified)
3. (United States) Victoria Hu (qualifying competition)
4. (Mexico) Victoria Rodríguez (qualified)
5. (Netherlands) Demi Tran (first round)
6. (Mexico) María Fernanda Navarro Oliva (qualifying competition)
7. (Belgium) Amélie Van Impe (qualifying competition)
8. (Mexico) Jéssica Hinojosa Gómez (qualifying competition)

=== Qualifiers ===
1. (Romania) Carmen Andreea Herea
2. (Ukraine) Valeriya Strakhova
3. (Canada) Dasha Plekhanova
4. (Mexico) Victoria Rodríguez

=== Draw ===
==== First qualifier ====
First round
1 | (Romania) Carmen Andreea Herea | 6 | 6
WC | (Mexico) Abril Cardenas Olivares | 2 | 3
(Colombia) María Torres Murcia | 7^{7} | 2 | 1
6 | (Mexico) María Fernanda Navarro Oliva | 6^{5} | 6 | 6

Qualifying competition
1 | (Romania) Carmen Andreea Herea | 6 | 6
6 | (Mexico) María Fernanda Navarro Oliva | 2 | 1

==== Second qualifier ====
First round
2 | (Ukraine) Valeriya Strakhova | 6 | 6
WC | (United States) Gabriela Vilar | 0 | 0
(United States) Sophie Llewellyn | 2 | 3
7 | (Belgium) Amélie Van Impe | 6 | 6

Qualifying competition
2 | (Ukraine) Valeriya Strakhova | 6 | 5 | 6
7 | (Belgium) Amélie Van Impe | 1 | 7 | 4

==== Third qualifier ====
First round
3 | (United States) Victoria Hu | 6 | 6
(Mexico) Natalia Sousa Salazar | 4 | 2
(Canada) Dasha Plekhanova | 6 | 6
5 | (Netherlands) Demi Tran | 3 | 1

Qualifying competition
3 | (United States) Victoria Hu | 2 | 3
(Canada) Dasha Plekhanova | 6 | 6

==== Fourth qualifier ====
First round
4 | (Mexico) Victoria Rodríguez | 6^{5} | 6 | 6
(Colombia) María Herazo | 7^{7} | 1 | 4
(Australia) Alexandra Osborne | 0 | 6^{4}
8 | (Mexico) Jéssica Hinojosa Gómez | 6 | 7^{7}

Qualifying competition
4 | (Mexico) Victoria Rodríguez | 1 | 6 | 6
8 | (Mexico) Jéssica Hinojosa Gómez | 6 | 1 | 4
