= 2025 Querétaro Open =

- Date: 20–26 October 2025
- Edition: 1st
- Category: WTA 125
- Prize money: $115,000
- Surface: Clay
- Location: Querétaro, Mexico

Champions

Singles
- (Czech Republic) Sára Bejlek

Doubles
- (Spain) Alicia Herrero Liñana / (Ukraine) Valeriya Strakhova
Querétaro Open	· 2026 →

The 2025 Querétaro Open was a professional women's tennis tournament played on outdoor clay courts. It was the first edition of the tournament and part of the 2025 WTA 125 tournaments. It took place in Querétaro, Mexico between 20 and 26 October 2025.

== Singles main-draw entrants ==
=== Seeds ===
Country	Player	Rank^{1}	Seed
CZE	Sára Bejlek	100	1
USA	Varvara Lepchenko	149	2
BEL	Hanne Vandewinkel	163	3
MEX	Ana Sofía Sánchez	182	4
ROU	Miriam Bulgaru	232	5
USA	Hanna Chang	249	6
FRA	Séléna Janicijevic	251	7
ITA	Jessica Pieri	286	8

- ^{1} Rankings are as of 13 October 2025.

=== Other entrants ===
The following players received wildcards into the singles main draw:

- (Mexico) Midori Castillo Meza
- (Mexico) Carlota Garibay Romero
- (Mexico) Marianne Ángel González
- (Mexico) Natalia Sousa Salazar

The following player entered the main draw through protected ranking:

- (Italy) Martina Colmegna

The following players received entry from the qualifying draw:

- (United States) Haley Giavara
- (Mexico) María Fernanda Navarro Oliva
- Elina Nepliy
- (United States) Katrina Scott

=== Withdrawals ===
Before the tournament

- (Canada) Carson Branstine → replaced by (United States) Usue Maitane Arconada
- (France) Émeline Dartron → replaced by (Italy) Diletta Cherubini
- (Kazakhstan) Zhibek Kulambayeva → replaced by (Slovakia) Martina Okáľová
- (United States) Elizabeth Mandlik → replaced by (Mexico) María Portillo Ramírez
- (India) Sahaja Yamalapalli → replaced by (United States) Madison Sieg

== Doubles entrants ==
=== Seeds ===
Country	Player	Country	Player	Rank	Seed
ESP	Alicia Herrero Liñana	UKR	Valeriya Strakhova	287	1
USA	Haley Giavara	AUS	Alexandra Osborne	430	2

- Rankings as of 13 October 2025.

=== Other entrants ===
The following pair received a wildcard into the doubles main draw:

- (Mexico) Midori Castillo Meza / (Mexico) Natalia Sousa Salazar

== Champions ==
=== Singles ===
- (Czech Republic) Sára Bejlek def. (United States) Katrina Scott, 6–2, 6–1

=== Doubles ===
- (Spain) Alicia Herrero Liñana / (Ukraine) Valeriya Strakhova def. (Mexico) Marian Gómez Pezuela Cano / (United States) Varvara Lepchenko, 7–5, 6–2
