= 2025 Querétaro Open – Singles =

Singles
- 2025 Querétaro Open

Final
- Champion: (Czech Republic) Sára Bejlek
- Runner-up: (United States) Katrina Scott
- Score: 6–2, 6–1

Details
- Draw: 32 (4 WC)
- Seeds: 8

Events
Singles	Doubles
- Querétaro Open

This was the first edition of the tournament.

Sára Bejlek won the title, defeating Katrina Scott in the final, 6–2, 6–1.

== Seeds ==
1. (Czech Republic) Sára Bejlek (champion)
2. (United States) Varvara Lepchenko (first round)
3. (Belgium) Hanne Vandewinkel (semifinals)
4. (Mexico) Ana Sofía Sánchez (second round)
5. (Romania) Miriam Bulgaru (quarterfinals)
6. (United States) Hanna Chang (second round)
7. (France) Séléna Janicijevic (quarterfinals)
8. (Italy) Jessica Pieri (quarterfinals)

== Draw ==
Key

- Q = Qualifier
- WC = Wild card
- LL = Lucky loser
- Alt = Alternate
- ITF = ITF entry
- PR = Protected ranking
- SR = Special ranking
- SE = Special exempt
- JE = Junior exempt
- JR = Junior Accelerator Programme entrant
- CO = College Accelerator Programme entrant
- NG = Next Gen Accelerator Program entrant
- w/o = Walkover
- r = Retired
- d = Defaulted

=== Finals ===
Semifinals
1	(Czech Republic) Sára Bejlek	6	6
(Italy) Martina Colmegna	3	2
3	(Belgium) Hanne Vandewinkel	7^{7}	2	5
Q	(United States) Katrina Scott	6^{5}	6	7

Final
1	(Czech Republic) Sára Bejlek	6	6
Q	(United States) Katrina Scott	2	1

=== Top half ===
First round
1	(Czech Republic) S Bejlek	6	5	6
(United States) UM Arconada	3	7	3
Q	E Nepliy	4	4
(Romania) G Lee	6	6
(Bulgaria) L Karatancheva	2	1
(Mexico) V Rodríguez	6	6
WC	(Mexico) C Garibay Romero	1	0
7	(France) S Janicijevic	6	6
4	(Mexico) AS Sánchez	2	6	6
(Serbia) K Jokić	6	3	4
(Netherlands) L Tran	3	2
(Italy) M Colmegna	6	6
(Italy) D Cherubini	1	6	6
(Italy) M Trevisan	6	1	3
WC	(Mexico) N Sousa Salazar	4	5
8	(Italy) J Pieri	6	7

Second round
1	(Czech Republic) S Bejlek	7	6
(Romania) G Lee	5	3
(Mexico) V Rodríguez	5	4
7	(France) S Janicijevic	7	6
4	(Mexico) AS Sánchez	0	0
(Italy) M Colmegna	6	6
(Italy) D Cherubini	2	6	2
8	(Italy) J Pieri	6	4	6

Quarterfinals
1	(Czech Republic) S Bejlek	6	6
7	(France) S Janicijevic	4	0
(Italy) M Colmegna	6	6
8	(Italy) J Pieri	1	3

Semifinals
1	(Czech Republic) S Bejlek	6	6
(Italy) M Colmegna	3	2

=== Bottom half ===
First round
6	(United States) H Chang	7	6
(Japan) Y Naito	5	2
WC	(Mexico) MÁ González	0	1
(Spain) A Herrero Liñana	6	6
(United States) J Pareja	6	6
(Ukraine) V Strakhova	3	3
WC	(Mexico) M Castillo Meza	2	2
3	(Belgium) H Vandewinkel	6	6
5	(Romania) M Bulgaru	6	6
Q	(Mexico) MF Navarro Oliva	2	3
E Kazionova	3	6	5
(Slovakia) M Okáľová	6	2	7
Q	(United States) H Giavara	6	6
(Mexico) M Portillo Ramírez	2	3
Q	(United States) K Scott	6	7^{7}
2	(United States) V Lepchenko	1	6^{2}

Second round
6	(United States) H Chang	2	6	4
(Spain) A Herrero Liñana	6	4	6
(United States) J Pareja	4	1
3	(Belgium) H Vandewinkel	6	6
5	(Romania) M Bulgaru	7^{7}	6
(Slovakia) M Okáľová	6^{5}	3
Q	(United States) H Giavara	7	0	4
Q	(United States) K Scott	5	6	6

Quarterfinals
(Spain) A Herrero Liñana	2	5
3	(Belgium) H Vandewinkel	6	7
5	(Romania) M Bulgaru	6	6^{7}	2
Q	(United States) K Scott	3	7^{9}	6

Semifinals
3	(Belgium) H Vandewinkel	7^{7}	2	5
Q	(United States) K Scott	6^{5}	6	7

== Qualifying ==
=== Seeds ===
1. (United States) Haley Giavara (qualified)
2. (United States) Katrina Scott (qualified)
3. (Mexico) María Portillo Ramírez (moved to main draw)
4. Elina Nepliy (qualified)
5. (Mexico) María Fernanda Navarro Oliva (qualified)
6. (Slovenia) Kristina Novak (qualifying competition)
7. (Colombia) María Herazo (qualifying competition)
8. (Australia) Alexandra Osborne (qualifying competition)

=== Qualifiers ===
1. (United States) Haley Giavara
2. (United States) Katrina Scott
3. (Mexico) María Fernanda Navarro Oliva
4. Elina Nepliy

=== Qualifying draw ===
==== First qualifier ====
First round				Qualifying competition
				1	(United States) Haley Giavara	7	4	6
				6	(Slovenia) Kristina Novak	5	6	4
	(Mexico) Marian Gómez Pezuela Cano	3	4	6	(Slovenia) Kristina Novak	5	6	4
6	(Slovenia) Kristina Novak	6	6

==== Second qualifier ====
First round					Qualifying competition
					2	(United States) Katrina Scott	6	6
					8	(Australia) Alexandra Osborne	1	0
WC	(Bosnia and Herzegovina) Anita Wagner	6	6^{5}	1	8	(Australia) Alexandra Osborne	1	0
8	(Australia) Alexandra Osborne	4	7^{7}	6

==== Third qualifier ====
Qualifying competition
WC	(Mexico) Katherine Torres López	3	2
5	(Mexico) María Fernanda Navarro Oliva	6	6

==== Fourth qualifier ====
First round				Qualifying competition
				4	Elina Nepliy	7^{7}	6
				7	(Colombia) María Herazo	6^{4}	3
WC	(Mexico) Daniela Martínez Guerrero	2	4	7	(Colombia) María Herazo	6^{4}	3
7	(Colombia) María Herazo	6	6
