= 2026 Querétaro Open =

- Date: 26 October–1 November
- Edition: 2nd
- Category: WTA 125
- Prize money: $115,000
- Surface: Clay
- Location: Querétaro, Mexico

Champions

Singles
- (Canada) Bianca Andreescu

Doubles
- (Belgium) Sofia Costoulas / (Ukraine) Valeriya Strakhova
- Querétaro Open

The 2026 Querétaro Open was a professional women's tennis tournament played on outdoor clay courts. It was the second edition of the tournament and part of the 2026 WTA 125 tournaments. It took place at the Club Campestre de Querétaro in Querétaro, Mexico between 26 October and 1 November 2026.

== Singles main-draw entrants ==
=== Seeds ===
Country	Player	Rank^{1}	Seed
GER	Tatjana Maria	69	1
FRA	Léolia Jeanjean	93	2
FRA	Fiona Ferro	100	3
CAN	Bianca Andreescu	132	4
SLO	Tamara Zidanšek	143	5
BEL	Sofia Costoulas	163	6
COL	Emiliana Arango	164	7
ARG	Nadia Podoroska	205	8

- ^{1} Rankings are as of 19 October 2026.

=== Other entrants ===
The following players received wildcards into the singles main draw:

- (Mexico) Carlota Garibay Romero
- (Mexico) Marian Gómez Pezuela Cano
- (United States) Katherine Hui
- (United States) Adriana Reami

The following players received entry from the qualifying draw:

- (Romania) Carmen Andreea Herea
- (Canada) Dasha Plekhanova
- (Mexico) Victoria Rodríguez
- (Ukraine) Valeriya Strakhova

=== Withdrawals ===
Before the tournament

- (United Kingdom) Naiktha Bains → replaced by (United Kingdom) Sofia Johnson
- (Spain) Jéssica Bouzas Maneiro → replaced by (China) Mi Lan
- (Italy) Martina Trevisan → replaced by (Italy) Diletta Cherubini

== Doubles entrants ==
=== Seeds ===
Country	Player	Country	Player	Rank	Seed
BEL	Sofia Costoulas	UKR	Valeriya Strakhova	287	1
FRA	Carole Monnet	AUS	Alexandra Osborne	324	2

- Rankings as of 19 October 2026.

=== Withdrawal ===
During the tournament

- (Romania) Miriam Bulgaru / (Slovenia) Polona Hercog (Bulgaru – injury)

== Champions ==
=== Singles ===
- (Canada) Bianca Andreescu def. (Germany) Tatjana Maria 6–1, 2–6, 6–3

=== Doubles ===
- (Belgium) Sofia Costoulas / (Ukraine) Valeriya Strakhova def. (Mexico) Marian Gómez Pezuela Cano / (Argentina) Nadia Podoroska 6–1, 6–1
