= 2026 Querétaro Open – Doubles =

Doubles
- 2026 Querétaro Open

Final
- Champions: (Belgium) Sofia Costoulas (Ukraine) Valeriya Strakhova
- Runners-up: (Mexico) Marian Gómez Pezuela Cano (Argentina) Nadia Podoroska
- Score: 6–1, 6–1

Details
- Draw: 8
- Seeds: 2

Events
Singles	Doubles
- Querétaro Open

Alicia Herrero Liñana and Valeriya Strakhova were the reigning champions, but Herrero Liñana chose not to compete.

Strakhova partnered Sofia Costoulas and won the title, defeating Marian Gómez Pezuela Cano and Nadia Podoroska 6–1, 6–1 in the final.

== Seeds ==
1. (Belgium) Sofia Costoulas / (Ukraine) Valeriya Strakhova (champions)
2. (France) Carole Monnet / (Australia) Alexandra Osborne (quarterfinals)

== Draw ==
Key

- Q = Qualifier
- WC = Wild card
- LL = Lucky loser
- Alt = Alternate
- ITF = ITF entry
- PR = Protected ranking
- SR = Special ranking
- SE = Special exempt
- JE = Junior exempt
- JR = Junior Accelerator Programme entrant
- CO = College Accelerator Programme entrant
- NG = Next Gen Accelerator Program entrant
- w/o = Walkover
- r = Retired
- d = Defaulted

=== Draw ===
Quarterfinals
1	(Belgium) S Costoulas (Ukraine) V Strakhova	7^{7}	6
(Mexico) MF Navarro Oliva (Poland) Z Pawlikowska	6^{3}	3
(United Kingdom) S Johnson (Ecuador) M Reasco	6	7^{7}
(Colombia) E Arango (France) L Jeanjean	3	6^{4}
(Romania) M Bulgaru (Slovenia) P Hercog	6	6
(Mexico) V Rodríguez (Netherlands) D Tran	3	4
(Mexico) M Gómez Pezuela Cano (Argentina) N Podoroska	5	6	[10]
2	(France) C Monnet (Australia) A Osborne	7	3	[8]

Semifinals
1	(Belgium) S Costoulas (Ukraine) V Strakhova	6	6
(United Kingdom) S Johnson (Ecuador) M Reasco	3	3
(Romania) M Bulgaru (Slovenia) P Hercog
(Mexico) M Gómez Pezuela Cano (Argentina) N Podoroska	w/o

Final
1	(Belgium) S Costoulas (Ukraine) V Strakhova	6	6
(Mexico) M Gómez Pezuela Cano (Argentina) N Podoroska	1	1
