= 2021 ITS Cup =

Tennis tournament

- Date: 19–25 July 2021
- Edition: 12th
- Category: ITF Women's World Tennis Tour
- Prize money: $60,000
- Surface: Clay
- Location: Olomouc, Czech Republic

Champions

Singles
- (Czech Republic) Sára Bejlek

Doubles
- (United States) Jessie Aney / (Czech Republic) Anna Sisková
- ITS Cup

The 2021 ITS Cup was a professional women's tennis tournament played on outdoor clay courts. It was the twelfth edition of the tournament which was part of the 2021 ITF Women's World Tennis Tour. It took place in Olomouc, Czech Republic between 19 and 25 July 2021.

== Singles main-draw entrants ==
=== Seeds ===
Country	Player	Rank^{1}	Seed
HUN	Panna Udvardy	204	1
GBR	Francesca Jones	206	2
FRA	Amandine Hesse	211	3
SUI	Susan Bandecchi	219	4
SUI	Simona Waltert	235	5
ITA	Jessica Pieri	244	6
NED	Richèl Hogenkamp	246	7
MEX	Ana Sofía Sánchez	251	8

- ^{1} Rankings are as of 12 July 2021.

=== Other entrants ===
The following players received wildcards into the singles main draw:

- (Czech Republic) Nikola Bartůňková
- (Czech Republic) Sára Bejlek
- (Czech Republic) Nikola Břečková
- (Czech Republic) Anna Sisková

The following player received entry using a protected ranking:

- (Germany) Anna Zaja

The following player received entry using a junior exempt:

- (France) Diane Parry

The following players received entry from the qualifying draw:

- (Romania) Miriam Bulgaru
- (Chile) Bárbara Gatica
- (United States) Elizabeth Halbauer
- (Czech Republic) Monika Kilnarová
- (Germany) Lena Papadakis
- (Slovenia) Nika Radišić
- (Greece) Sapfo Sakellaridi
- (Czech Republic) Julie Štruplová

== Champions ==
=== Singles ===
- (Czech Republic) Sára Bejlek def. (Argentina) Paula Ormaechea, 6–0, 6–0

=== Doubles ===
- (United States) Jessie Aney / (Czech Republic) Anna Sisková def. (Chile) Bárbara Gatica / (Brazil) Rebeca Pereira, 6–1, 6–0
