= 2025 Querétaro Open – Doubles =

Doubles
- 2025 Querétaro Open

Final
- Champion: (Spain) Alicia Herrero Liñana (Ukraine) Valeriya Strakhova
- Runner-up: (Mexico) Marian Gómez Pezuela Cano (United States) Varvara Lepchenko
- Score: 7–5, 6–2

Events
Singles	Doubles
Querétaro Open	· 2026 →

This was the first edition of the tournament.

Alicia Herrero Liñana and Valeriya Strakhova won the title, defeating Marian Gómez Pezuela Cano and Varvara Lepchenko in the final, 7–5, 6–2.

== Seeds ==
1. (Spain) Alicia Herrero Liñana / (Ukraine) Valeriya Strakhova (champions)
2. (United States) Haley Giavara / (Australia) Alexandra Osborne (semifinals)

== Draw ==
Key

- Q = Qualifier
- WC = Wild card
- LL = Lucky loser
- Alt = Alternate
- ITF = ITF entry
- PR = Protected ranking
- SR = Special ranking
- SE = Special exempt
- JE = Junior exempt
- JR = Junior Accelerator Programme entrant
- CO = College Accelerator Programme entrant
- NG = Next Gen Accelerator Program entrant
- w/o = Walkover
- r = Retired
- d = Defaulted

=== Draw ===
Quarterfinals
1	(Spain) A Herrero Liñana (Ukraine) V Strakhova	6	6
(Slovenia) K Novak (Slovakia) M Okáľová	4	2
(Netherlands) L Tran (Bosnia and Herzegovina) A Wagner	0	3
(France) S Janicijevic (Bulgaria) L Karatancheva	6	6
WC	(Mexico) M Castillo Meza (Mexico) N Sousa Salazar	6	1	[8]
(Mexico) M Gómez Pezuela Cano (United States) V Lepchenko	1	6	[10]
(Mexico) V Rodríguez (Mexico) AS Sánchez	3	4
2	(United States) H Giavara (Australia) A Osborne	6	6

Semifinals
1	(Spain) A Herrero Liñana (Ukraine) V Strakhova	6	7^{7}
(France) S Janicijevic (Bulgaria) L Karatancheva	4	6^{5}
(Mexico) M Gómez Pezuela Cano (United States) V Lepchenko	6	7
2	(United States) H Giavara (Australia) A Osborne	3	5

Final
1	(Spain) A Herrero Liñana (Ukraine) V Strakhova	7	6
(Mexico) M Gómez Pezuela Cano (United States) V Lepchenko	5	2
