= 2021 ITS Cup – Doubles =

Doubles
- 2021 ITS Cup

Final
- Champions: (United States) Jessie Aney (Czech Republic) Anna Sisková
- Runners-up: (Chile) Bárbara Gatica (Brazil) Rebeca Pereira
- Score: 6–1, 6–0

Events
Singles	Doubles
- ITS Cup

Anastasia Dețiuc and Johana Marková were the defending champions but Dețiuc chose to compete in Gdynia instead. Marková played alongside Chantal Škamlová, but they lost in the first round to Jessie Aney and Anna Sisková.

Aney and Sisková went on to win the title, defeating Bárbara Gatica and Rebeca Pereira in the final, 6–1, 6–0.

== Seeds ==
1. (Czech Republic) Johana Marková / (Slovakia) Chantal Škamlová (first round)
2. (Slovenia) Nika Radišić / (Mexico) Ana Sofía Sánchez (quarterfinals)
3. (Russia) Valentina Ivakhnenko / (Romania) Andreea Prisăcariu (first round)
4. (Czech Republic) Miriam Kolodziejová / (Czech Republic) Jesika Malečková (first round)

== Draw ==
Key

- Q = Qualifier
- WC = Wild card
- LL = Lucky loser
- Alt = Alternate
- ITF = ITF entry
- PR = Protected ranking
- SR = Special ranking
- SE = Special exempt
- JE = Junior exempt
- JR = Junior Accelerator Programme entrant
- CO = College Accelerator Programme entrant
- NG = Next Gen Accelerator Program entrant
- w/o = Walkover
- r = Retired
- d = Defaulted

=== Draw ===
First round
1	(Czech Republic) J Marková (Slovakia) C Škamlová	3	4
WC	(United States) J Aney (Czech Republic) A Sisková	6	6
(Japan) H Kuwata (Slovakia) Z Zlochová	4	3
(Germany) L Papadakis (Germany) A Zaja	6	6
4	(Czech Republic) M Kolodziejová (Czech Republic) J Malečková	4	4
(Japan) N Hanatani (Australia) A Parnaby	6	6
(Hungary) A Nagy (Turkey) İ Öz	6	1	[9]
WC	(Czech Republic) D Hindová (Czech Republic) D Viďmanová	3	6	[11]
(United States) E Halbauer (United States) K Stewart	7^{7}	6
Alt	(Czech Republic) K Kubáňová (Czech Republic) N Tomanová	6^{3}	4
(France) A Hesse (France) D Parry	4	6	[10]
3	(Russia) V Ivakhnenko (Romania) A Prisăcariu	6	2	[7]
(Netherlands) I Haverlag (United Kingdom) O Nicholls	3	6	[8]
(Chile) B Gatica (Brazil) R Pereira	6	2	[10]
(Croatia) T Lukas (Cyprus) R Șerban	6^{4}	3
2	(Slovenia) N Radišić (Mexico) AS Sánchez	7^{7}	6

Quarterfinals
WC	(United States) J Aney (Czech Republic) A Sisková	6	6
(Germany) L Papadakis (Germany) A Zaja	1	1
(Japan) N Hanatani (Australia) A Parnaby	1	0
WC	(Czech Republic) D Hindová (Czech Republic) D Viďmanová	6	6
(United States) E Halbauer (United States) K Stewart	3	2
(France) A Hesse (France) D Parry	6	6
(Chile) B Gatica (Brazil) R Pereira	7^{7}	6
2	(Slovenia) N Radišić (Mexico) AS Sánchez	6^{5}	2

Semifinals
WC	(United States) J Aney (Czech Republic) A Sisková	6	6
WC	(Czech Republic) D Hindová (Czech Republic) D Viďmanová	0	2
(France) A Hesse (France) D Parry	3	5
(Chile) B Gatica (Brazil) R Pereira	6	7

Final
WC	(United States) J Aney (Czech Republic) A Sisková	6	6
(Chile) B Gatica (Brazil) R Pereira	1	0
