= 2021 ITS Cup – Singles =

Singles
- 2021 ITS Cup

Final
- Champion: (Czech Republic) Sára Bejlek
- Runner-up: (Argentina) Paula Ormaechea
- Score: 6–0, 6–0

Events
Singles	Doubles
- ITS Cup

Jesika Malečková was the defending champion but lost to Francesca Jones in the first round.

Sára Bejlek won the title, defeating Paula Ormaechea in the final, 6–0, 6–0.

== Seeds ==
1. (Hungary) Panna Udvardy (semifinals)
2. (United Kingdom) Francesca Jones (semifinals)
3. (France) Amandine Hesse (second round)
4. (Switzerland) Susan Bandecchi (first round)
5. (Switzerland) Simona Waltert (second round)
6. (Italy) Jessica Pieri (second round)
7. (Netherlands) Richèl Hogenkamp (first round)
8. (Mexico) Ana Sofía Sánchez (first round)

== Draw ==
Key

- Q = Qualifier
- WC = Wild card
- LL = Lucky loser
- Alt = Alternate
- ITF = ITF entry
- PR = Protected ranking
- SR = Special ranking
- SE = Special exempt
- JE = Junior exempt
- JR = Junior Accelerator Programme entrant
- CO = College Accelerator Programme entrant
- NG = Next Gen Accelerator Program entrant
- w/o = Walkover
- r = Retired
- d = Defaulted

=== Finals ===
Semifinals
1	(Hungary) Panna Udvardy	6	5	2
(Argentina) Paula Ormaechea	3	7	6
WC	(Czech Republic) Sára Bejlek	6	6
2	(United Kingdom) Francesca Jones	0	3

Final
(Argentina) Paula Ormaechea	0	0
WC	(Czech Republic) Sára Bejlek	6	6

=== Top half ===
First round
1	(Hungary) P Udvardy	6	6
WC	(Czech Republic) N Bartůňková	0	2
(Croatia) T Lukas	4	3
(Cyprus) R Șerban	6	6
PR	(Germany) A Zaja	7	7
(Czech Republic) M Kolodziejová	5	5
Q	(Czech Republic) M Kilnarová	0	7	3
5	(Switzerland) S Waltert	6	5	6
3	(France) A Hesse	7^{7}	6
Q	(United States) E Halbauer	6^{5}	4
Q	(Czech Republic) J Štruplová	4	6^{5}
(Australia) J Fourlis	6	7^{7}
WC	(Czech Republic) N Břečková	6	3	6
WC	(Czech Republic) A Sisková	3	6	3
(Argentina) P Ormaechea	6	6
7	(Netherlands) R Hogenkamp	4	1

Second round
1	(Hungary) P Udvardy	6	6
(Cyprus) R Șerban	1	0
PR	(Germany) A Zaja	7^{7}	6
5	(Switzerland) S Waltert	6^{5}	1
3	(France) A Hesse	6	4	6^{5}
(Australia) J Fourlis	3	6	7^{7}
WC	(Czech Republic) N Břečková	1	1
(Argentina) P Ormaechea	6	6

Quarterfinals
1	(Hungary) P Udvardy	6	6
PR	(Germany) A Zaja	2	2
(Australia) J Fourlis	2	7^{7}	6^{5}
(Argentina) P Ormaechea	6	6^{3}	7^{7}

Semifinals
1	(Hungary) P Udvardy	6	5	2
(Argentina) P Ormaechea	3	7	6

=== Bottom half ===
First round
8	(Mexico) AS Sánchez	4	2
(Slovenia) D Jakupović	6	6
WC	(Czech Republic) S Bejlek	6	6
(Slovakia) Z Zlochová	3	1
Q	(Greece) S Sakellaridi	6^{2}	1
JE	(France) D Parry	7^{7}	6
Q	(Chile) B Gatica	1	6	7
4	(Switzerland) S Bandecchi	6	2	5
6	(Italy) J Pieri	2
(Australia) S Mendez	0^{r}
Q	(Slovenia) N Radišić	5	6	6
Q	(Romania) M Bulgaru	7	0	3
Q	(Germany) L Papadakis	6	6
(Russia) V Ivakhnenko	4	0
(Czech Republic) J Malečková	5	4
2	(United Kingdom) F Jones	7	6

Second round
(Slovenia) D Jakupović	6	2	0^{r}
WC	(Czech Republic) S Bejlek	3	6	3
JE	(France) D Parry	3	7	6
Q	(Chile) B Gatica	6	5	2
6	(Italy) J Pieri	6	1	2
Q	(Slovenia) N Radišić	0	6	6
Q	(Germany) L Papadakis	4	5
2	(United Kingdom) F Jones	6	7

Quarterfinals
WC	(Czech Republic) S Bejlek	6	6
JE	(France) D Parry	1	4
Q	(Slovenia) N Radišić	4	1
2	(United Kingdom) F Jones	6	6

Semifinals
WC	(Czech Republic) S Bejlek	6	6
2	(United Kingdom) F Jones	0	3
