= Querétaro Open =

Tournament information
- Event name: Querétaro Open
- Location: Querétaro, Mexico
- Venue: Club Campestre de Querétaro
- Category: WTA 125
- Surface: Clay
- Draw: 32S/11Q/8D
- Prize money: $115,000
- Website: Official Website

Current champions (2026)
- Singles: (Canada) Bianca Andreescu
- Doubles: (Belgium) Sofia Costoulas (Ukraine) Valeriya Strakhova

The Querétaro Open is a tournament for professional female tennis players played on outdoor clay courts. The event is classified as a WTA 125 tournament and is held at the Club Campestre de Querétaro in Querétaro, Mexico. This is the first time that the city of Querétaro has organized any international tennis event.

== Past finals ==
=== Singles ===
| Year | Champion | Runners-up | Score |
|---|---|---|---|
| 2026 | (Canada) Bianca Andreescu | (Germany) Tatjana Maria | 6–1, 2–6, 6–3 |
| 2025 | (Czech Republic) Sára Bejlek | (United States) Katrina Scott | 6–2, 6–1 |

=== Doubles ===
| Year | Champions | Runners-up | Score |
|---|---|---|---|
| 2026 | (Belgium) Sofia Costoulas (Ukraine) Valeriya Strakhova (2) | (Mexico) Marian Gómez Pezuela Cano (Argentina) Nadia Podoroska | 6–1, 6–1 |
| 2025 | (Spain) Alicia Herrero Liñana (Ukraine) Valeriya Strakhova | (Mexico) Marian Gómez Pezuela Cano (United States) Varvara Lepchenko | 7–5, 6–2 |
