= Sofia Costoulas =

Belgian tennis player (born 2005)

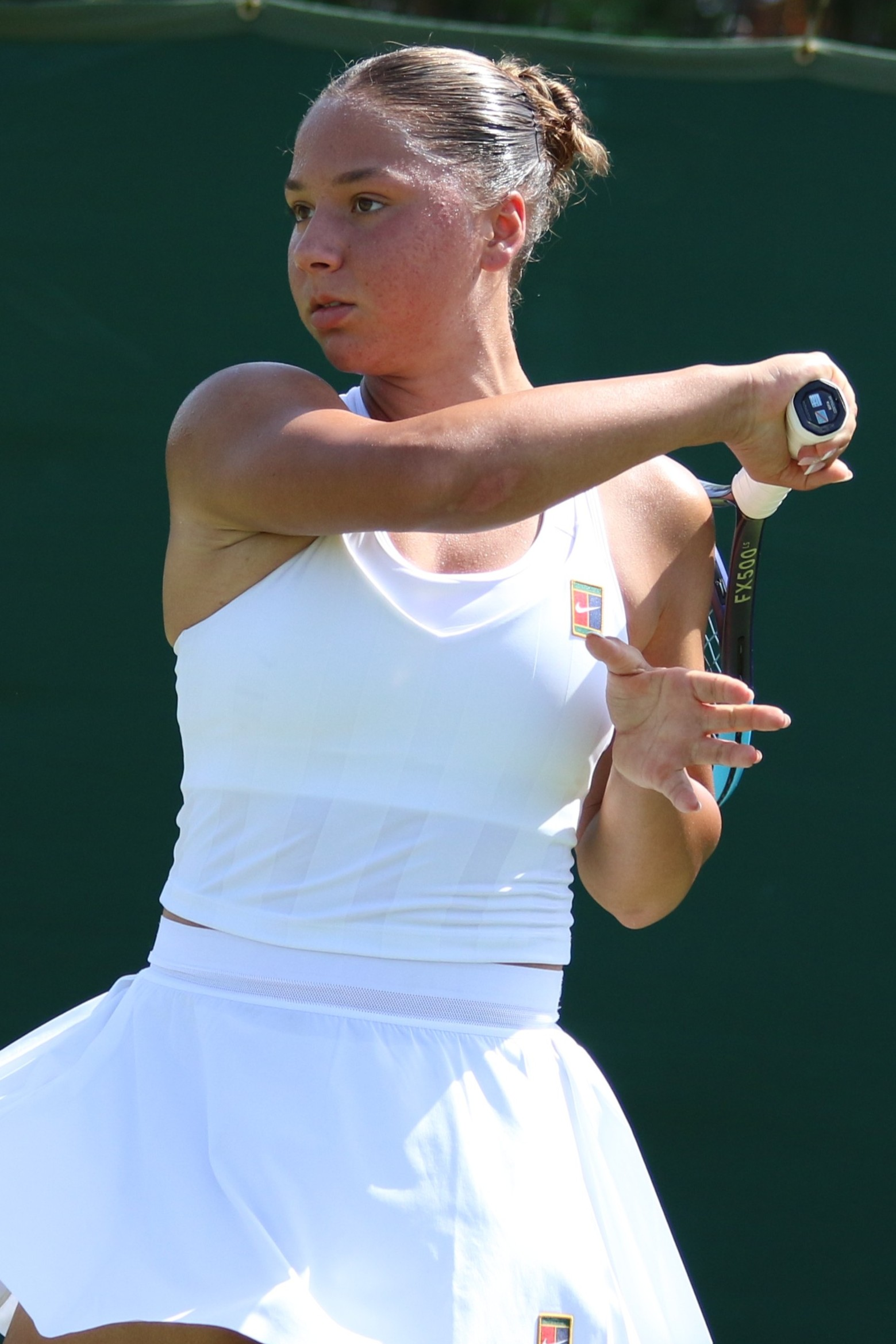
- Costoulas at the 2026 Wimbledon Championships
- Country (sports): Belgium
- Born: 2 April 2005 (age 21) Genk, Belgium
- Plays: Right (two-handed backhand)
- Prize money: $461,436

Singles
- Career record: 206–143
- Career titles: 5 ITF
- Highest ranking: No. 134 (30 March 2026)
- Current ranking: No. 183 (9 November 2026)

Grand Slam singles results
- Australian Open: Q1 (2026)
- French Open: Q3 (2026)
- Wimbledon: Q1 (2025, 2026)
- US Open: Q2 (2026)

Doubles
- Career record: 84–53
- Career titles: 2 WTA 125, 4 ITF
- Highest ranking: No. 154 (2 November 2026)
- Current ranking: No. 155 (9 November 2026)
- Last updated on: 9 November 2026.

Sofia Costoulas (Greek: Σοφία Κωστούλα, romanized: Kostoula; born 2 April 2005) is a Belgian professional tennis player. She has career-high rankings of No. 134 in singles, achieved on 30 March 2026, and No. 154 in doubles, reached on 2 November 2026. Costoulas has won two WTA 125 titles in doubles.

== Early life ==
Costoulas was born in Genk, Belgium to a Greek-Congolese father and a Belgian mother. Her father Sotiris was a professional footballer who played for Sint-Truidense V.V., K. Patro Eisden Maasmechelen, and C.S. Visé. She began playing tennis at the age of four. She trained at her local club in Genk, the Kim Clijsters Academy, and the Justine Henin Academy.

== Career overview ==
=== Juniors ===
In July 2021, she and Laura Hietaranta reached the girls' doubles final of Wimbledon, but lost to Kristina Dmitruk and Diana Shnaider. In September 2021, she reached the girls' singles third round of the US Open.

In January 2022, Costoulas won the J1 Traralgon Tennis International, defeating Kayla Cross in the final. Later that month, she reached the girls' singles final of the Australian Open, but lost to Petra Marčinko. In April 2022, she won back-to-back J1 titles in Vrsar and Plovdiv. The following month, she also won the JA International HTV Junior Open in Offenbach am Main.

=== Professional ===
In December 2021, Costoulas reached back-to-back W15 finals in Monastir. In February 2022, she reached the semifinals of the W25 Copa Banco in Guayaquil. In October 2022, she won her first professional doubles title at the W25 tournament in Hua Hin, partnering Punnin Kovapitukted.

In April 2025, she won her biggest singles title to-date at the W75 Ladies Open Calvi Eaux de Zilia, defeating Tessah Andrianjafitrimo in the final. The following month, she reached the second round of the qualifying competition of the French Open, but ultimately failed to advance into the main draw.

Costoulas made her WTA Tour main-draw debut as a qualifier at the 2026 Auckland Open and defeated fellow qualifiers Whitney Osuigwe and Kaitlin Quevedo to reach the quarterfinals, at which point her run was ended by third seed Iva Jovic.

Playing alongside Matilde Jorge, Costoulas won her first WTA 125 doubles title at the 2026 Oeiras Open, defeating Magali Kempen and Lara Salden in the final. Teaming with Valeriya Strakhova, she defeated Marian Gómez Pezuela Cano and Nadia Podoroska in the final of the 2026 Querétaro Open to claim her second WTA 125 doubles title.

== Grand Slam performance timeline ==
Key
W	F	SF	QF	#R	RR	Q#	P#	DNQ	A	Z#	PO	G	S	B	NMS	NTI	P	NH

(W) winner; (F) finalist; (SF) semifinalist; (QF) quarterfinalist; (#R) rounds 4, 3, 2, 1; (RR) round-robin stage; (Q#) qualification round; (P#) preliminary round; (DNQ) did not qualify; (A) absent; (Z#) Davis/Fed Cup Zonal Group (with number indication) or (PO) play-off; (G) gold, (S) silver or (B) bronze Olympic/Paralympic medal; (NMS) not a Masters tournament; (NTI) not a Tier I tournament; (P) postponed; (NH) not held; (SR) strike rate (events won / competed); (W–L) win–loss record.
To avoid confusion and double counting, these charts are updated at the conclusion of a tournament or when the player's participation has ended.

=== Singles ===
Tournament	2025	2026	W–L
Australian Open	A	Q1	0–0
French Open	Q2	Q3	0–0
Wimbledon	Q1	Q1	0–0
US Open	Q1	Q2	0–0
Win–loss	0–0	0–0	0–0

== WTA 125 finals ==
=== Doubles: 2 (titles) ===
Result	W–L	Date	Tournament	Surface	Partner	Opponents	Score
Win	1-0	Apr 2026	Oeiras CETO Open, Portugal	Clay	(Portugal) Matilde Jorge	(Belgium) Magali Kempen (Belgium) Lara Salden	6–4, 6–2
Win	2-0	Oct 2026	Querétaro Open, Mexico	Clay	(Ukraine) Valeriya Strakhova	(Mexico) Marian Gómez Pezuela Cano (Argentina) Nadia Podoroska	6–1, 6–1

== ITF Circuit finals ==
=== Singles: 13 (5 titles, 8 runner-ups) ===
Legend W75 tournaments W50 tournaments W25/35 tournaments W15 tournaments	Finals by surface Hard (4–6) Clay (1–2)

Result	W–L	Date	Tournament	Tier	Surface	Opponent	Score
Loss	0–1	Feb 2021	ITF Sharm El Sheikh, Egypt	W15	Hard	(Belgium) Magali Kempen	3–6, 2–6
Loss	0–2	Dec 2021	ITF Monastir, Tunisia	W15	Hard	(Hong Kong) Eudice Chong	6–3, 4–6, 6–7^{(5)}
Loss	0–3	Jan 2022	ITF Monastir, Tunisia	W15	Hard	(Lithuania) Akvilė Paražinskaitė	5–7, 2–6
Loss	0–4	Jun 2022	ITF Gurugram, India	W25	Hard	(India) Karman Thandi	4–6, 6–2, 1–6
Win	1–4	May 2023	ITF Feld am See, Austria	W25	Clay	(Belgium) Lara Salden	6–3, 6–1
Loss	1–5	Nov 2023	ITF Limassol, Cyprus	W25	Hard	(Belgium) Hanne Vandewinkel	2–6, 6–4, 4–6
Win	2–5	Dec 2023	ITF Limassol, Cyprus	W25	Hard	(Italy) Silvia Ambrosio	6–1, 6–3
Loss	2–6	May 2024	ITF Klagenfurt, Austria	W35	Clay	(Belgium) Marie Benoît	1–6, 3–6
Win	3–6	Mar 2025	ITF Helsinki, Finland	W35	Hard (i)	(United Kingdom) Lily Miyazaki	6–3, 7–5
Win	4–6	Apr 2025	ITF Calvi, France	W75	Hard	(France) Tessah Andrianjafitrimo	7–5, 6–1
Loss	4–7	May 2025	ITF Otočec, Slovenia	W50	Clay	(Hungary) Amarissa Tóth	3–6, 3–6
Loss	4–8	Aug 2025	ITF Heraklion, Greece	W35	Hard	(Serbia) Lola Radivojević	0–6, 1–4 ret.
Win	5–8	Mar 2026	Kōfu International Open, Japan	W75	Hard	(China) Ma Yexin	7–5, 6–3

=== Doubles: 12 (4 titles, 8 runner-ups) ===
Legend W60/75 tournaments W50 tournaments W25/35 tournaments W15 tournaments	Finals by surface Hard (2–6) Clay (2–1) Carpet (0–1)

Result	W–L	Date	Tournament	Tier	Surface	Partner	Opponents	Score
Loss	1–0	Feb 2022	ITF Monastir, Tunisia	W15	Hard	(United States) Clervie Ngounoue	(Belarus) Kristina Dmitruk (Russia) Maria Sholokhova	6–3, 2–6, [5–10]
Win	1–1	Oct 2022	ITF Hua Hin, Thailand	W25	Hard	(Thailand) Punnin Kovapitukted	(Japan) Risa Ushijima (South Korea) Wi Hwi-won	6–1, 6–2
Loss	1–2	Mar 2023	ITF Pretoria, South Africa	W60	Hard	(Italy) Dalila Spiteri	(Japan) Mai Hontama (France) Alice Tubello	3–6, 3–6
Loss	1–3	May 2023	ITF Feld am See, Austria	W25	Clay	(Canada) Kayla Cross	(Czech Republic) Denisa Hindová (United States) Chiara Scholl	2–6, 0–6
Win	2–3	Jun 2023	ITF Troisdorf, Germany	W25	Clay	(Belgium) Lara Salden	(United States) Chiara Scholl (Belgium) Tilwith Di Girolami	7–6^{(4)}, 6–4
Win	3–3	Jun 2023	ITF Tainan, Taiwan	W25	Clay	(Chinese Taipei) Li Yu-yun	(Chinese Taipei) Lee Ya-hsin (Chinese Taipei) Lee Ya-hsuan	6–4, 6–4
Loss	3–4	Jul 2023	ITF Corroios, Portugal	W25	Hard	(Switzerland) Lulu Sun	(Australia) Talia Gibson (Australia) Petra Hule	3–6, 6–3, [6–10]
Loss	3–5	Sep 2023	ITF Leiria, Portugal	W25	Hard	(Switzerland) Jenny Dürst	(Portugal) Francisca Jorge (Portugal) Matilde Jorge	5–7, 6–7^{(5)}
Loss	3–6	Feb 2024	ITF Pretoria, South Africa	W50	Hard	(Belgium) Hanne Vandewinkel	(Israel) Lina Glushko (Czech Republic) Gabriela Knutson	6–7^{(5)}, 6–7^{(4)}
Loss	3–7	Mar 2025	ITF Solarino, Italy	W35	Carpet	(Germany) Katharina Hobgarski	(Slovakia) Viktória Hrunčáková (Slovakia) Katarína Kužmová	7–6^{(4)}, 4–6, [5–10]
Loss	3–8	Mar 2025	Open Nantes Atlantique, France	W50	Hard (i)	(Australia) Talia Gibson	(Poland) Martyna Kubka (Sweden) Lisa Zaar	3–6, 2–6
Win	4–8	Mar 2026	All Japan Indoor Championships	W75	Hard (i)	Sofya Lansere	(Japan) Hayu Kinoshita (Japan) Sara Saito	6–2, 6–4

== Junior Grand Slam tournament finals ==
=== Singles: 1 (runner-up) ===
Result	Year	Tournament	Surface	Opponent	Score
Loss	2022	Australian Open	Hard	(Croatia) Petra Marčinko	5–7, 1–6

=== Doubles: 1 (runner-up) ===
Result	Year	Tournament	Surface	Partner	Opponents	Score
Loss	2021	Wimbledon	Grass	(Finland) Laura Hietaranta	(Belarus) Kristina Dmitruk (Russia) Diana Shnaider	1–6, 2–6
