= Katrina Scott =

American tennis player (born 2004)

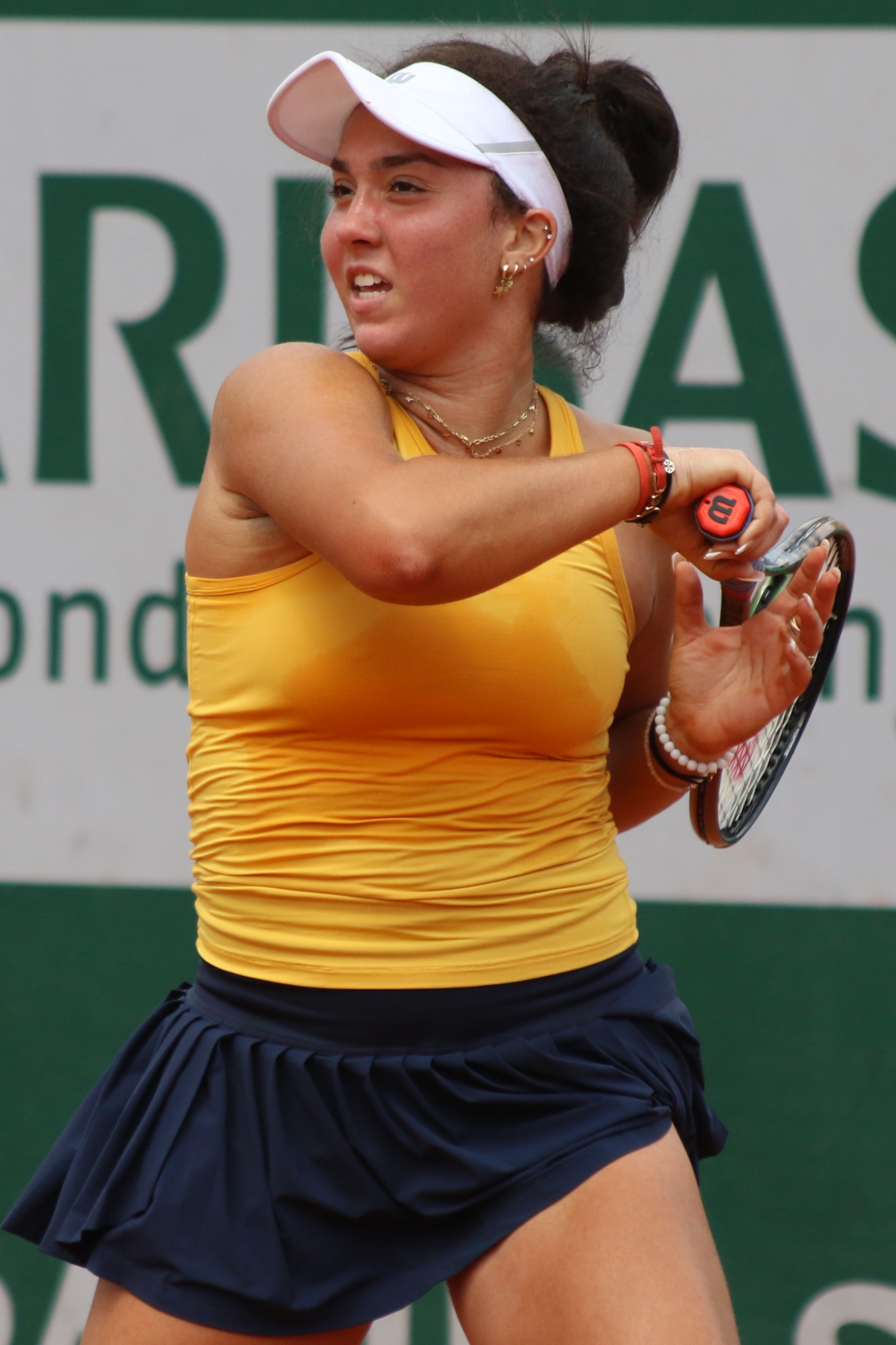
- Scott at the 2023 French Open
- Country (sports): United States
- Residence: Woodland Hills, Los Angeles
- Born: June 11, 2004 (age 22)
- Height: 1.83 m (6 ft 0 in)
- Plays: Right (two-handed backhand)
- Prize money: $494,481

Singles
- Career record: 150–116
- Highest ranking: No. 149 (October 10, 2022)
- Current ranking: No. 244 (August 24, 2026)

Grand Slam singles results
- Australian Open: Q1 (2023)
- French Open: Q1 (2023)
- Wimbledon: Q1 (2023)
- US Open: 2R (2020)

Doubles
- Career record: 13–33
- Highest ranking: No. 552 (October 21, 2024)
- Current ranking: No. 1,029 (August 24, 2026)

Grand Slam doubles results
- US Open: 1R (2022)
- Last updated on: August 24, 2026.

Katrina Scott (born 11 June 2004) is an American tennis player. She has a WTA singles career-high ranking of 149, achieved on October 10, 2022, and a doubles best of 552, reached on October 21, 2024.

== Career ==
=== Juniors ===
Brought up in Woodland Hills, Los Angeles, in 2019 and already 5'11 as a 15 year old, Scott reached the quarterfinals as a wildcard at the junior 2019 US Open, losing in three sets to Oksana Selekhmeteva, and, as a qualifier, the round of 16 of Wimbledon where she lost in three sets to Emma Navarro. In September 2019, Scott with Robin Montgomery and Connie Ma won the Junior Federation Cup, United States' third consecutive win. Scott and Montgomery following in the immediate footsteps of the likes of Amanda Anisimova and Coco Gauff who were part of triumphant teams in the previous years.

=== Professional ===
Scott made her Grand Slam tournament debut at the 2020 US Open as a wildcard entrant. She defeated Natalia Vikhlyantseva in straight sets to win her first round match, and took a set off Amanda Anisimova, before losing in the second round.

She received a wildcard into the main draw of the 2021 Miami Open, but lost in straight sets to Sorana Cîrstea in the first round.

Ranked No. 296, Scott also received a wildcard entry for the main draw of the 2024 Tennis in the Land in Cleveland, losing in the first round to fellow wildcard entrant and eventual champion, McCartney Kessler.

As a qualifier, Scott reached her first WTA 125 final at the 2025 Querétaro Open, which she lost to top seed Sára Bejlek.

== WTA Challenger finals ==
=== Singles: 1 (runner-up) ===
Result	W–L	Date	Tournament	Surface	Opponent	Score
Loss	0–1	Oct 2025	Querétaro Open, Mexico	Clay	(Czech Republic) Sára Bejlek	2–6, 1–6

== ITF finals ==
=== Singles: 7 (4 titles, 3 runner-ups) ===
Legend
W80 tournaments
W50 tournaments
W25/35 tournaments

Result	W–L	Date	Tournament	Tier	Surface	Opponent	Score
Win	1–0	May 2022	ITF Daytona Beach, United States	W25	Clay	(United States) Reese Brantmeier	6–2, 6–4
Win	2–0	Jul 2022	ITF Columbus, United States	W25	Hard	(United States) Peyton Stearns	7–5, 6–3
Win	3–0	Jul 2022	Dallas Summer Series, United States	W25	Hard	(United States) Elvina Kalieva	6–1, 6–0
Loss	3–1	Oct 2022	Rancho Santa Fe Open, United States	W80	Hard	(Mexico) Marcela Zacarías	1–6, 2–6
Win	4–1	Apr 2024	ITF Jackson, United States	W35	Clay	(United States) Jamie Loeb	7–6^{(9)}, 7–6^{(6)}
Loss	4–2	Feb 2026	ITF Orlando, United States	W50	Hard	(United States) Kayla Day	4–6, 2–6
Loss	4–3	May 2026	Pelham Racquet Club Pro Classic, United States	W50	Clay	(United States) Madison Brengle	1–6, 4–6

=== Doubles: 1 (title) ===
Legend
W50 tournaments

Result	W–L	Date	Tournament	Tier	Surface	Partner	Opponents	Score
Win	1–0	Jul 2024	Dallas Summer Series, United States	W50	Hard	(United States) Usue Maitane Arconada	(Mexico) Jéssica Hinojosa Gómez (Japan) Hiroko Kuwata	6–3, 6–3
