= Sára Bejlek =

Czech tennis player (born 2006)

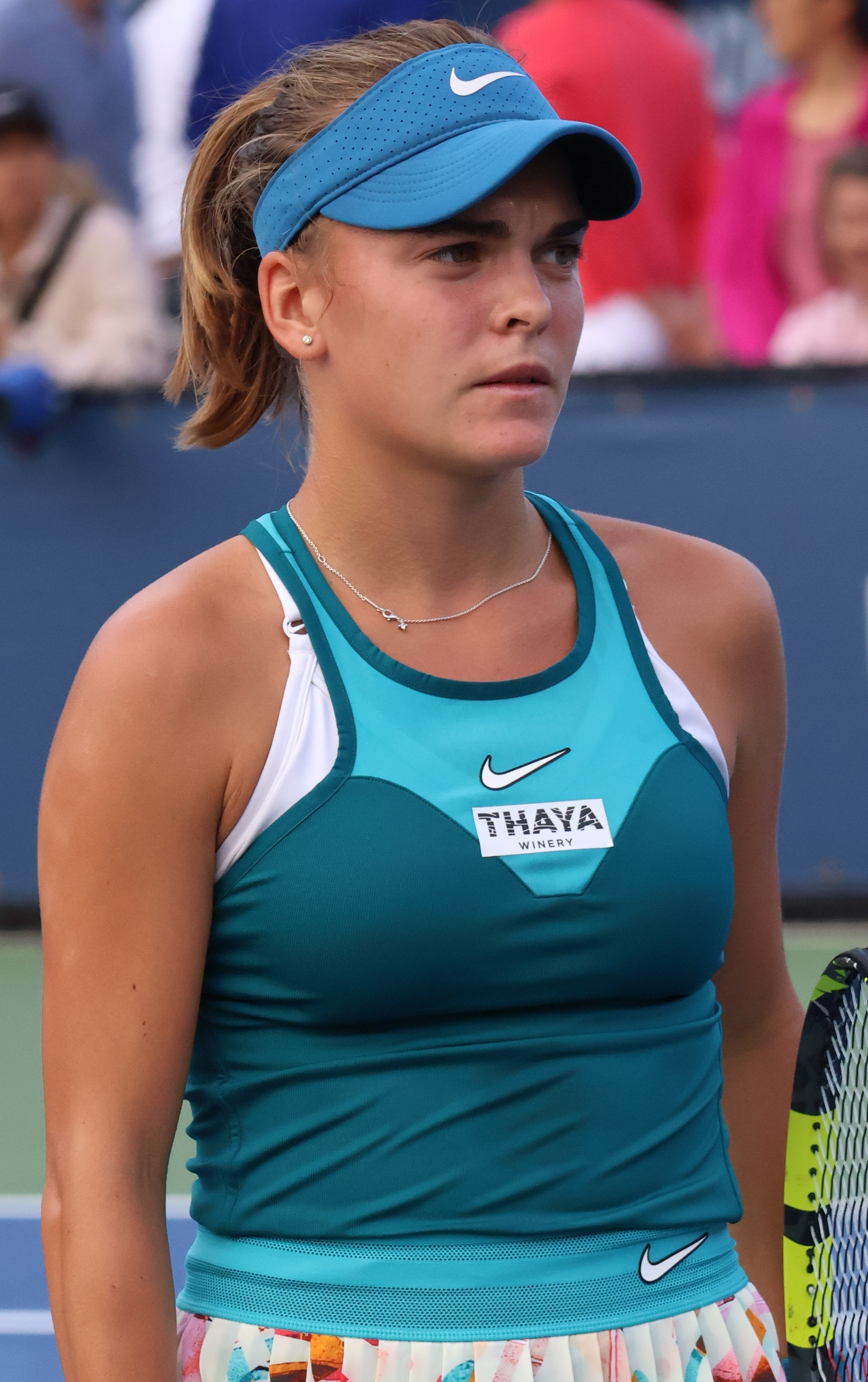
- Bejlek at the 2023 US Open
- Country (sports): Czech Republic
- Residence: Hrušovany nad Jevišovkou, Czech Republic
- Born: 31 January 2006 (age 20) Znojmo, Czech Republic
- Height: 1.63 m (5 ft 4 in)
- Plays: Left-handed (two-handed backhand)
- Coach: Jakub Kahoun
- Prize money: US$ 2,263,492
- Official website: sarabejlek.com

Singles
- Career record: 184–92
- Career titles: 1
- Highest ranking: No. 28 (14 September 2026)
- Current ranking: No. 30 (12 October 2026)

Grand Slam singles results
- Australian Open: 1R (2023, 2024, 2025, 2026)
- French Open: 2R (2025, 2026)
- Wimbledon: 1R (2026)
- US Open: 1R (2022, 2026)

Doubles
- Career record: 11–8
- Career titles: 1 ITF
- Highest ranking: No. 671 (1 August 2022)
- Current ranking: No. 1,610 (12 October 2026)

Grand Slam doubles results
- Australian Open: 1R (2026)

Team competitions
- BJK Cup: W (2026)
- Last updated on: 12 October 2026.

Sára Bejlek (born 31 January 2006) is a Czech professional tennis player. She has a career-high WTA singles ranking of No. 28, achieved on 14 September 2026, and a best doubles ranking of No. 671, reached in 2022.

Bejlek has won one WTA Tour singles title at the 2026 Abu Dhabi Open, as well as four singles titles on the WTA Challenger Tour.

== Career ==
=== Junior years ===
Bejlek won the 2022 French Open girl's doubles event, partnering with Lucie Havlíčková. In addition, she reached the semifinals in singles.

==== Grand Slam performance ====
Singles:

- Australian Open: –
- French Open: SF (2022)
- Wimbledon: 2R (2021)
- US Open: –

Doubles:

- Australian Open: –
- French Open: W (2022)
- Wimbledon: 2R (2021)
- US Open: –

=== 2021: First ITF Circuit title & top 500 ===
In July, she won her first and up to date biggest title at the $60k ITS Cup in Olomouc, Czech Republic, by double bagelling Paula Ormaechea in the final. As a result, after making her WTA rankings debut, she improved her rank by 557 positions to No. 447 in just one month.

=== 2022: Major & top 200 debuts ===
In June, at the Česká Lípa, she won the $60k Macha Lake Open, defeating fellow Czech Jesika Malečková in the final. The following week, Bejlek made her Grand Slam tournament qualifying debut at Wimbledon Championships, but she was defeated by Emina Bektas. A month later, she defended her title at the ITS Cup, this time defeating Lina Gjorcheska in the final. She continued with making progress at the US Open making her major main-draw debut, after three wins in the qualifying. She was the youngest player in the tournament's main draw, having been the youngest direct entrant to qualifying.

=== 2023: Australian and French Open debuts ===
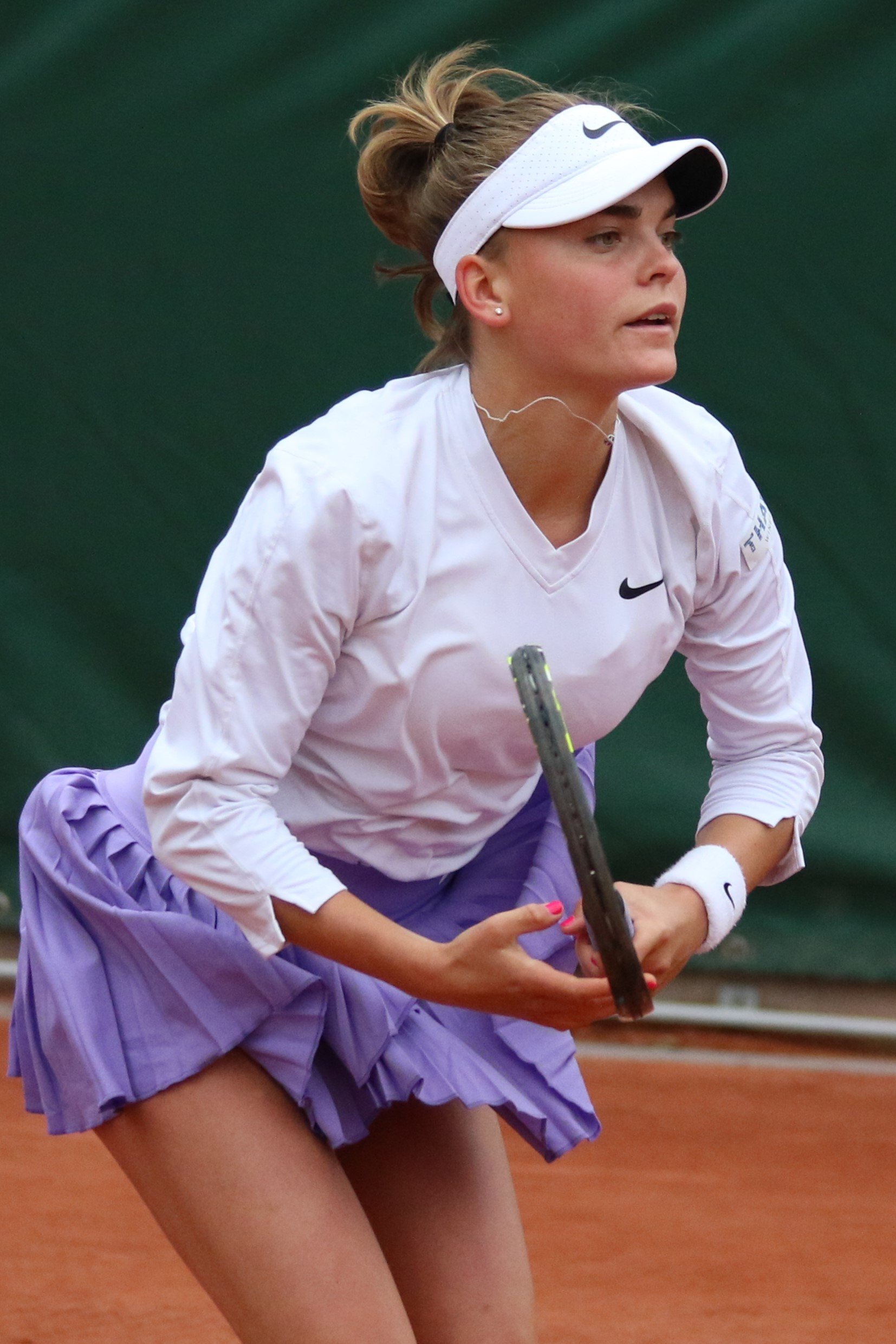
Bejlek at the 2023 French Open

At 16, as the second-youngest player in the top 200, she made her debut at the Australian Open. She lost to her compatriot Barbora Krejčíková in the first round. In early April, she reached her first final of the year, the $60k tournament in Split, but lost to Tara Würth.

A month later, she made her qualifying debut at the WTA 1000 tournament at the Italian Open. In the first round of qualifying, she triumphed with losing only three games. Still, she failed to qualify, after losing in the following round of qualifying. Next destination was the French Open where she qualified without losing a set, to reach the main draw at Roland Garros for the first time. Like the previous two major main-draw appearances, she lost in the first round, this time to Kamilla Rakhimova.

After failing in Wimbledon in qualifying, she reached another $60k final in the Hague but lost it to Arantxa Rus. Two weeks later, she finally won her first title of the year, at the $25k event in Pärnu, Estonia. In early September, she reached her third $60k final of the year in the Czech Republic, at the Prague Open, but again finished runner-up.

Bejlek won her first WTA 125 title at the Copa Colina in Chile on 19 November, defeating Diane Parry in the final.

=== 2024: WTA 1000 and top 125 debuts ===
At the Australian Open, Bejlek qualified into the main draw for the second consecutive year but lost in the first round to 32nd seed Leylah Fernandez.

She also qualified for the Madrid Open, making her WTA 1000 debut and recording wins over Anna Blinkova, 24th seed Anna Kalinskaya and Ashlyn Krueger to reach the fourth round, where she lost to Elena Rybakina in straight sets. As a result, she reached a new career-high ranking of world No. 114, on 6 May 2024.

=== 2025: WTA Tour quarterfinal, top 75 ===
For the third year in a row, Bejlek qualified for the Australian Open, making her the youngest player at 18 years-old to qualify for the women's main draw, but lost in the first round, this time to Caroline Dolehide.

For a second time, ranked No. 193, Bejlek also reached the main draw at the French Open, after qualifying with a straight-sets win over top seed Yuliia Starodubtseva. She recorded her first major match win, upsetting 26th seed Marta Kostyuk, before losing to Jaqueline Cristian in the second round. Bejlek claimed her second WTA 125 title at the Makarska Open in Croatia, defeating Victoria Jiménez Kasintseva in the final. At the Prague Open, she reached her first WTA Tour quarterfinal with wins over Moyuka Uchijima and eighth seed Alycia Parks, before her run was ended by fourth seed Wang Xinyu.

Bejlek lifted her third WTA 125 title in October at the inaugural edition of the Internazionali di Calabria in Rende, Italy, as she defeated Lola Radivojević in the final. Subsequently, she made her debut in the top 100 on 13 October 2025, as she reached the quarterfinals (where she withdrew) at the WTA 125 Mallorca Championships, becoming the sixth teenager in the top 100. Bejlek won her fourth WTA 125 title of the year at Querétaro Open, defeating Katrina Scott in the final. This result moved her to No. 84 in the WTA rankings on 27 October 2025. Bejlek finished the season ranked No. 76 on 17 November 2025.

=== 2026: First tour title, WTA 1000 semifinal, top 30 ===
Ranked No. 101 at the 2026 Abu Dhabi Open, Bejlek won her first WTA Tour title and also first at the WTA 500-level, as a qualifier, with wins over seventh seed Jeļena Ostapenko, qualifier Sonay Kartal, in a little over an hour, third seed Clara Tauson and second seed Ekaterina Alexandrova in the final. As a result, she reached a new career-high in the top 40, subsequently rising more than 60 positions up to No. 37 in the singles rankings on 23 February 2026.

Her breakthrough came at the Cincinnati Open, where she defeated Karolína Plíšková, Barbora Krejčíková, Ekaterina Alexandrova, world No. 1, Aryna Sabalenka, and Madison Keys to reach the semifinals, where she was elimimated by the eventual champion, Coco Gauff. This led to her reaching a career-high rank of No. 29.

== Personal life ==
Bejlek was born in Znojmo, but has lived in the nearby town of Hrušovany nad Jevišovkou since birth.

Bejlek draws inspiration from Rafael Nadal and compatriot Petra Kvitová. Beyond tennis, she is known for her passion for heavy metal music; Bejlek is a fan of bands Metallica and Slipknot.

== Performance timelines ==
Key
W	F	SF	QF	#R	RR	Q#	P#	DNQ	A	Z#	PO	G	S	B	NMS	NTI	P	NH

(W) winner; (F) finalist; (SF) semifinalist; (QF) quarterfinalist; (#R) rounds 4, 3, 2, 1; (RR) round-robin stage; (Q#) qualification round; (P#) preliminary round; (DNQ) did not qualify; (A) absent; (Z#) Davis/Fed Cup Zonal Group (with number indication) or (PO) play-off; (G) gold, (S) silver or (B) bronze Olympic/Paralympic medal; (NMS) not a Masters tournament; (NTI) not a Tier I tournament; (P) postponed; (NH) not held; (SR) strike rate (events won / competed); (W–L) win–loss record.
To avoid confusion and double counting, these charts are updated at the conclusion of a tournament or when the player's participation has ended.

Only main-draw results in WTA Tour, Grand Slam tournaments, Billie Jean King Cup, United Cup, Hopman Cup and Olympic Games are included in win–loss records.

=== Singles ===
Current through the 2026 Ningbo Open.

Tournament	2022	2023	2024	2025	2026	SR	W–L	Win%
Grand Slam tournaments
Australian Open	A	1R	1R	1R	1R	0 / 4	0–4	0%
French Open	A	1R	A	2R	2R	0 / 3	2–3	40%
Wimbledon	Q1	Q1	Q1	A	1R	0 / 1	0–1	0%
US Open	1R	Q1	Q1	Q1	1R	0 / 2	0–2	0%
Win–Loss	0–1	0–2	0–1	1–2	1–4	0 / 10	2–10	17%
National representation
Billie Jean King Cup	A	SF	QF	A	W	1 / 3	0–0	–
WTA 1000 tournaments
Qatar Open	A	NTI	A	A	A	0 / 0	0–0	–
Dubai Championships	NTI	A	A	A	2R (Note: Withdrew during the tournament. Not counted as a loss.)	0 / 1	1–0	100%
Indian Wells Open	A	A	A	A	A	0 / 0	0–0	–
Miami Open	A	A	A	A	1R	0 / 1	0–1	0%
Madrid Open	A	A	4R	Q2	A	0 / 1	3–1	75%
Italian Open	A	Q2	A	A	1R	0 / 1	0–1	0%
Canadian Open	A	A	A	A	2R	0 / 1	1–1	50%
Cincinnati Open	A	A	A	A	SF	0 / 1	5–1	83%
China Open	NH	A	A	A	3R	0 / 1	1–1	50%
Wuhan Open	Not Held		A	A	1R	0 / 1	0–1	0%
Win–Loss	0–0	0–0	3–1	0–0	8–6	0 / 8	11–7	61%
Career statistics
	2022	2023	2024	2025	2026	SR	W–L	Win %
Tournaments	1	2	4	4	22	Career total: 33		
Titles	0	0	0	0	1	Career total: 1		
Finals	0	0	0	0	1	Career total: 1		
Hard Win–Loss	0–1	0–1	0–2	2–3	21–12	1 / 21	23–19	55%
Clay Win–Loss	0–0	0–1	3–2	1–1	2–4	0 / 8	6–8	43%
Grass Win–Loss	0–0	0–0	0–0	0–0	1–3	0 / 4	1–3	25%
Overall Win–Loss	0–1	0–2	3–4	3–4	24–19	1 / 33	30–30	50%
Year-end ranking	189	190	142	76		$2,263,492		

=== Doubles ===
Tournament	2026	SR	W–L	Win%
Grand Slam tournaments
Australian Open	1R	0 / 1	0–1	0%
French Open	A	0 / 0	0–0	–
Wimbledon	A	0 / 0	0–0	–
US Open	A	0 / 0	0–0	–
Win–Loss	0–1	0 / 1	0–1	0%

== WTA Tour finals ==
=== Singles: 1 (title) ===
Legend WTA 500 (1–0)	Finals by surface Hard (1–0)	Finals by setting Outdoors (1–0)

Result	Date	Tournament	Tier	Surface	Opponent	Score
Win	Feb 2026	Abu Dhabi Open, UAE	WTA 500	Hard	Ekaterina Alexandrova	7–6^{(7–5)}, 6–1

== WTA 125 finals ==
=== Singles: 4 (4 titles) ===
Result	W–L	Date	Tournament	Surface	Opponent	Score
Win	1–0	Nov 2023	Copa Colina, Chile	Clay	(France) Diane Parry	6–2, 6–1
Win	2–0	Jun 2025	Makarska Open, Croatia	Clay	(Andorra) Victoria Jiménez Kasintseva	6–0, 6–1
Win	3–0	Oct 2025	Internazionali di Calabria, Italy	Clay	(Serbia) Lola Radivojević	6–2, 6–7^{(1–7)}, 6–3
Win	4–0	Oct 2025	Querétaro Open, Mexico	Clay	(United States) Katrina Scott	6–2, 6–1

== ITF Circuit finals ==
=== Singles: 10 (7 titles, 3 runner-ups) ===
Legend W60/75 tournaments (4–1) W40 tournaments (0–2) W25 tournaments (3–0)	Finals by surface Clay (7–3)

Result	W–L	Date	Tournament	Tier	Surface	Opponent	Score
Win	1–0	Jul 2021	ITS Cup Olomouc, Czech Republic	W60	Clay	(Argentina) Paula Ormaechea	6–0, 6–0
Win	2–0	May 2022	ITF Santa Margherita di Pula, Italy	W25	Clay	(Poland) Weronika Falkowska	7–6^{(7–4)}, 6–1
Win	3–0	Jun 2022	Macha Lake Open, Czech Republic	W60	Clay	(Czech Republic) Jesika Malečková	6–4, 6–4
Win	4–0	Jul 2022	ITS Cup Olomouc, Czech Republic (2)	W60	Clay	(North Macedonia) Lina Gjorcheska	6–2, 7–6^{(7–0)}
Loss	4–1	Apr 2023	ITF Split, Croatia	W40	Clay	(Croatia) Tara Würth	2–6, 6–3, 4–6
Loss	4–2	Jul 2023	ITF The Hague, Netherlands	W40	Clay	(Netherlands) Arantxa Rus	6–7^{(3–7)}, 4–6
Win	5–2	Jul 2023	ITF Pärnu, Estonia	W25	Clay	(Croatia) Lucija Ćirić Bagarić	7–5, 6–4
Loss	5–3	Sep 2023	ITF Prague Open, Czech Republic	W60	Clay	(Romania) Andreea Mitu	6–7^{(1–7)}, 6–2, 3–6
Win	6–3	Oct 2023	ITF Santa Margherita di Pula, Italy	W25	Clay	(Sweden) Caijsa Hennemann	6–4, 7–6^{(9–7)}
Win	7–3	Sep 2024	Šibenik Open, Croatia	W75	Clay	(Latvia) Darja Semeņistaja	6–2, 6–0

=== Doubles: 1 (title) ===
Legend W15 tournaments (1–0)	Finals by surface Clay (1–0)

Result	Date	Tournament	Tier	Surface	Partner	Opponents	Score
Win	Jun 2021	ITF Antalya, Turkey	W15	Clay	(Turkey) Doğa Türkmen	(Italy) Federica Bilardo (Ukraine) Liubov Kostenko	4–6, 6–1, [10–7]

== ITF Junior Circuit ==
=== Junior Grand Slam finals ===
==== Doubles: 1 (title) ====
Result	Year	Tournament	Surface	Partner	Opponents	Score
Win	2022	French Open	Clay	(Czech Republic) Lucie Havlíčková	(Czech Republic) Nikola Bartůňková (Switzerland) Céline Naef	6–3, 6–3

=== ITF Junior Circuit finals ===
==== Singles: 6 (2 titles, 4 runner-ups) ====
Legend Grade 2 (0–2) Grade 3 (1–0) Grade 4 (0–1) Grade 5 (1–1)	Finals by surface Hard (0–1) Clay (2–3)

Result	W–L	Date	Tournament	Tier	Surface	Opponent	Score
Loss	0–1	Nov 2019	ITF Nastola, Finland	Grade 5	Hard	(Russia) Veronika Solovyeva	6–7^{(6–8)}, 4–6
Loss	0–2	Sep 2020	ITF Rakovnik, Czech Republic	Grade 2	Clay	(Czech Republic) Julie Štruplová	6–7^{(2–7)}, 2–6
Win	1–2	Oct 2020	ITF Constanța, Romania	Grade 3	Clay	(Romania) Vanessa Popa Teiusanu	6–1, 6–1
Loss	1–3	Jan 2021	ITF Cairo, Egypt	Grade 4	Clay	(Italy) Emma Valletta	6–7^{(5–7)}, 2–6
Win	2–3	Feb 2021	ITF Giza, Egypt	Grade 5	Clay	(Egypt) Jermine Sherif	7–5, 7–5
Loss	2–4	May 2021	ITF Oradea, Romania	Grade 2	Clay	(Czech Republic) Lucie Havlíčková	3–6, 3–6

==== Doubles: 11 (9 titles, 2 runner-ups) ====
Legend Grade A (1–0) Grade 1 (1–0) Grade 2 (3–0) Grade 3 (1–0) Grade 4 (2–1) Grade 5 (1–1)	Finals by surface Hard (1–0) Clay (7–2) Carpet (1–0)

Result	W–L	Date	Tournament	Tier	Surface	Partner	Opponents	Score
Win	1–0	Sep 2019	ITF Prague, Czech Republic	Grade 2	Clay	(Czech Republic) Lucie Havlíčková	(Russia) Julia Avdeeva (Russia) Alina Shcherbinina	6–2, 6–2
Win	2–0	Oct 2019	ITF Dornbirn, Austria	Grade 5	Carpet	(Croatia) Petra Marčinko	(Germany) Angelina Flachs (Germany) Carolina Kuhl	7–6^{(7–3)}, 6–7^{(1–7)}, [10–6]
Loss	2–1	Sep 2020	ITF Prague, Czech Republic	Grade 4	Clay	(Czech Republic) Lucie Havlíčková	(Czech Republic) Nelly Knezková (Czech Republic) Dominika Šalková	6–0, 1–6, [10–12]
Win	3–1	Jan 2021	ITF Antalya, Turkey	Grade 3	Clay	(Turkey) Melis Ayda Uyar	(Turkey) Defne Cirpanli (Turkey) Duru Soke	6–1, 2–6, [10–4]
Win	4–1	Jan 2021	ITF Cairo, Egypt	Grade 4	Clay	(Egypt) Maria Charl	(Russia) Serafima Shastova (Ukraine) Anastasiya Zholdakova	6–4, 6–2
Loss	4–2	Feb 2021	ITF Giza, Egypt	Grade 5	Clay	(Egypt) Layla Shoukry	(Spain) Lucia Martínez Gómez (Russia) Polina Skopintseva	2–6, 5–7
Win	5–2	Feb 2021	ITF Antalya, Turkey	Grade 4	Clay	(Slovakia) Sara Suchankova	(Switzerland) Karolina Kozakova (Switzerland) Céline Naef	6–4, 6–0
Win	6–2	Feb 2021	ITF Šiauliai, Lithuania	Grade 2	Hard	(France) Nahia Berecoechea	(Croatia) Lucija Ćirić Bagarić (Italy) Virginia Ferrara	6–2, 4–6, [10–7]
Win	7–2	May 2021	ITF Říčany, Czech Republic	Grade 1	Clay	(Czech Republic) Nikola Bartůňková	(United States) Alexis Blokhina (France) Flavie Brugnone	6–3, 6–4
Win	8–2	May 2021	ITF Oradea, Romania	Grade 2	Clay	(Czech Republic) Lucie Havlíčková	(Romania) Fatima Amartha Keita (Slovakia) Sara Suchanková	6–4 6–2
Win	9–2	Jun 2022	French Open	Grade A	Clay	(Czech Republic) Lucie Havlíčková	(Czech Republic) Nikola Bartůňková (Switzerland) Céline Naef	6–3, 6–3

== Wins against top 10 players ==
- Bejlek has a 1–3 record against players who were, at the time the match was played, ranked in the top 10.

No.	Player	Rk	Event	Surface	Rd	Score	Rk	Years	Ref
1	Aryna Sabalenka	1	Cincinnati Open, United States	Hard	4R	7–6^{(9–7)}, 6–4	35	2026	

- Key: (Rk) first use, opponent rank; (Rd) round; (Rk) 2nd use, player rank; (Ref) reference; (F) final; (SF) semifinal; (QF) quarterfinal; (#R) rounds 4, 3, 2, 1; (RR) round-robin stage; (Q#) qualifying rounds or stages (3), 2, 1.

== Double-bagel matches ==
Result	W–L	Year	Tournament	Tier	Surface	Opponent	Rk	Rd	SBR
Win	2021	1–0	ITS Cup, Czech Republic	W60	Clay	(Argentina) Paula Ormaechea	213	F	1004
Loss	2022	1–1	ITF Canberra, Australia	W25	Hard	(Australia) Talia Gibson	1158	1R	342
Loss	2023	1–2	US Open, United States	Grand Slam	Hard	(China) Wang Yafan	115	Q1	213
Win	2025	2–2	ITF Bengaluru, India	W100	Hard	(India) Shrivalli Bhamidipaty	330	1R	155
