= Marian Gómez Pezuela Cano =

Mexican tennis player (born 2001)

- Country (sports): Mexico
- Born: 24 September 2001 (age 25) Querétaro, Mexico
- Prize money: $52,733

Singles
- Career record: 76–129
- Highest ranking: No. 1,083 (10 August 2026)
- Current ranking: No. 1,173 (16 November 2026)

Doubles
- Career record: 101–99
- Career titles: 10 ITF
- Highest ranking: No. 255 (27 October 2025)
- Current ranking: No. 324 (16 November 2026)

Team competitions
- Fed Cup: 1–1
- Last updated on: 18 November 2026.

Marian Gómez Pezuela Cano (born 24 September 2001) is a Mexican professional tennis player.

She has a career-high doubles ranking by the WTA of No. 255, achieved on 27 October 2025. Gómez Pezuela Cano has won ten doubles titles on the ITF Women's World Tennis Tour.

== Career ==
In September 2025, Gómez became the doubles champion at the W35 event in Cuiabá, Brazil.

In October 2025, teaming up with Varvara Lepchenko, she lost her first career WTA 125 doubles final at the 2025 Querétaro Open, falling to Alicia Herrero Liñana and Valeriya Strakhova.

In February 2026, Gómez Pezuela Cano received a wildcard for the doubles draw of the WTA 500 Mérida Open, partnering with Renata Zarazúa.

In July 2026, she won her tenth doubles title at the W35 event in São Paulo, Brazil.

In September 2026, Gómez made her main-draw debut on the WTA Tour in the doubles of the Guadalajara Open, partnering with Sofía Cabezas Domínguez.

== WTA 125 finals ==
=== Doubles: 2 (runner-ups) ===
Result	W–L	Date	Tournament	Surface	Partner	Opponents	Score
Loss	0–1	Nov 2025	Querétaro Open, Mexico	Clay	(United States) Varvara Lepchenko	(Spain) Alicia Herrero Liñana (Ukraine) Valeriya Strakhova	5–7, 2–6
Loss	0–2	Oct 2026	Querétaro Open, Mexico	Clay	(Argentina) Nadia Podoroska	(Ukraine) Valeriya Strakhova (Belgium) Sofia Costoulas	1–6, 1–6

== ITF Circuit finals ==
=== Doubles: 18 (10 titles, 8 runner-ups) ===
Legend W25/35 tournaments (5–3) W15 tournaments (5–5)	Finals by surface Hard (1–2) Clay (9–6)

Result	W–L	Date	Tournament	Tier	Surface	Partner	Opponents	Score
Loss	0–1	Apr 2022	ITF São Paulo, Brazil	W15	Clay	(Chile) Fernanda Astete	(Argentina) Martina Capurro Taborda (Chile) Fernanda Labraña	2–6, 1–6
Loss	0–2	Oct 2022	ITF Eldorado, Argentina	W15	Clay	(Argentina) Luciana Moyano	(Argentina) Berta Bonardi (Argentina) Tiziana Rossini	6–7^{(3)}, 6–4, [7–10]
Loss	0–3	Oct 2022	ITF Tucumán, Argentina	W25	Clay	(Argentina) Luciana Moyano	(Netherlands) Lexie Stevens (Ukraine) Valeriya Strakhova	3–6, 2–6
Loss	0–4	Dec 2022	ITF Buenos Aires, Argentina	W15	Clay	(Argentina) María Victoria Marchesini	(Chile) Fernanda Astete (Peru) Anastasia Iamachkine	5–7, 4–6
Win	1–4	Nov 2023	ITF Córdoba, Argentina	W15	Clay	(Argentina) Justina González Daniele	(Argentina) Francesca Mattioli (Argentina) Mariana Zottoli	6–3, 4–6, [10–5]
Win	2–4	Jul 2024	ITF Luján, Argentina	W15	Clay	(Argentina) Luisina Giovannini	(Peru) Romina Ccuno (Peru) Lucciana Pérez	6–0, 6–2
Win	3–4	Aug 2024	ITF Chacabuco, Argentina	W35	Clay	(Argentina) Luisina Giovannini	(Argentina) Jazmín Ortenzi (Peru) Lucciana Pérez	w/o
Loss	3–5	Oct 2024	ITF Trelew, Argentina	W15	Hard (i)	(Argentina) Victoria Bosio	(Argentina) Luciana Moyano (Ecuador) Camila Romero	6–7^{(4)}, 3–6
Win	4–5	Nov 2024	ITF Neuquén, Argentina	W15	Clay	(Argentina) Luisina Giovannini	(Chile) Fernanda Labrana (Peru) Lucciana Pérez	6–3, 6–4
Win	5–5	Nov 2024	ITF Córdoba, Argentina	W15	Clay	(Argentina) Luisina Giovannini	(Argentina) Lourdes Ayala (Argentina) Maria Florencia Urrutia	6–3, 6–7^{(7)}, [10–8]
Win	6–5	May 2025	ITF Trelew, Argentina	W15	Hard (i)	(Argentina) Martina Capurro Taborda	(Argentina) Luciana Moyano (Ecuador) Camila Romero	6–0, 7–6^{(7)}
Loss	6–6	May 2025	ITF Trelew, Argentina	W15	Hard (i)	(Argentina) Martina Capurro Taborda	(Argentina) Luciana Moyano (Ecuador) Camila Romero	1–6, 4–6
Win	7–6	Jul 2025	ITF São Paulo, Brazil	W35	Clay	(Peru) Lucciana Pérez	(China) Dang Yiming (China) You Xiaodi	w/o
Loss	7–7	Jul 2025	ITF Pergamino, Argentina	W35	Clay	(Argentina) Luisina Giovannini	(Argentina) Martina Capurro Taborda (Peru) Julia Riera	4–6, 2–6
Win	8–7	Aug 2025	ITF Chacabuco, Argentina	W35	Clay	(Argentina) Luisina Giovannini	(Brazil) Ana Candiotto (Argentina) Justina Maria Gonzalez Daniele	3–6, 7–6^{(7)}, [10–5]
Win	9–7	Sep 2025	ITF Cuiabá, Brazil	W35	Clay	(Argentina) Martina Capurro Taborda	(Peru) Romina Ccuno (Colombia) María Paulina Pérez	6–4, 6–3
Loss	9–8	Mar 2026	ITF Junin, Argentina	W35	Clay	(Argentina) Luisina Giovannini	(Argentina) Martina Capurro Taborda (Poland) Gina Feistel	5–7, 3–6
Win	10–8	Jul 2026	ITF São Paulo, Brazil	W35	Clay	Daria Egorova	(Italy) Giorgia Pedone (Mexico) Ana Sofía Sánchez	6–2, 6–4
