= Diletta Cherubini =

Italian tennis player

- Country (sports): Italy
- Born: 9 May 2002 (age 24)
- Plays: Right (two-handed backhand)
- Prize money: $109,194

Singles
- Career record: 183–173
- Career titles: 0
- Highest ranking: No. 342 (8 June 2026)
- Current ranking: No. 374 (10 August 2026)

Doubles
- Career record: 59–50
- Career titles: 4 ITF
- Highest ranking: No. 390 (4 December 2023)
- Current ranking: No. 1066 (10 August 2026)
- Last updated on: 17 August 2026.

Diletta Cherubini (born 9 May 2002) is an Italian tennis player.

She has a career-high singles ranking by the WTA of 342, reached on 8 June 2026. She also has a best doubles ranking of world No. 390, achieved on 4 December 2023.

== Career ==
In August 2021, Cherubini played her first singles final.

She made her WTA Tour main-draw debut at the 2023 Italian Open, where she received a wildcard into the singles tournament, losing to Lisa Pigato in the first round.

== ITF Circuit finals ==
=== Singles: 4 (runner-ups) ===
Legend W50 tournaments W25/W35 tournaments W15 tournaments	Finals by surface Hard (0–2) Clay (0–2)

Result	W–L	Date	Tournament	Tier	Surface	Opponent	Score
Loss	0–1	Aug 2021	ITF Cairo, Egypt	W15	Clay	(Australia) Tina Nadine Smith	0–6, 2–6
Loss	0–2	Apr 2024	ITF Santa Margherita di Pula, Italy	W35	Clay	(Ukraine) Anastasiya Soboleva	1–6, 1–6
Loss	0–3	Jun 2025	ITF Tauste, Spain	W35	Hard	(Kazakhstan) Zarina Diyas	1–6, 7–6^{(4)}, 1–6
Loss	0–4	Nov 2026	ITF Huamantla, Mexico	W50	Hard	(United States) Malaika Rapolu	2–6, 3–6

=== Doubles: 11 (5 titles, 6 runner-ups) ===
Legend W50 tournaments W25/35 tournaments W15 tournaments	Finals by surface Hard (1–1) Clay (4–5)

Result	W–L	Date	Tournament	Tier	Surface	Partner	Opponents	Score
Loss	0–1	Apr 2022	ITF Cairo, Egypt	W15	Clay	(Germany) Emily Welker	(Romania) Ilinca Amariei (Germany) Carolina Kuhl	2–6, 6–2, [3–10]
Win	1–1	Apr 2022	ITF Cairo, Egypt	W15	Clay	Mariia Tkacheva	(France) Émeline Dartron (France) Lucie Nguyen Tan	3–6, 6–3, [10–8]
Win	2–1	May 2022	ITF Cairo, Egypt	W15	Clay	(Germany) Antonia Schmidt	Elizaveta Masnaia (Israel) Sofiia Nagornaia	6–1, 6–2
Loss	2–2	Dec 2022	ITF Monastir, Tunisia	W25	Hard	(Denmark) Olga Helmi	(Romania) Oana Gavrila (Greece) Sapfo Sakellaridi	1–6, 1–6
Win	3–2	Jul 2023	ITF Getxo, Spain	W25	Clay	(Czech Republic) Anna Sisková	(Italy) Nicole Fossa Huergo (Bolivia) Noelia Zeballos	6–2, 6–4
Loss	3–3	Aug 2023	Vrnjačka Banja Open, Serbia	W25	Clay	(Finland) Laura Hietaranta	(Serbia) Elena Milovanović (Australia) Ivana Popovic	4–6, 1–6
Win	4–3	Nov 2023	ITF Bangalore, India	W25	Clay	(Germany) Antonia Schmidt	(Thailand) Punnin Kovapitukted; Anna Ureke	4–6, 7–5, [10–4]
Loss	4–4	Jun 2024	ITF Madrid, Spain	W15	Clay	(Germany) Carolina Kuhl	(Colombia) María Herazo González (Italy) Francesca Pace	3–6, 5–7
Loss	4–5	Mar 2025	ITF Jackson, United States	W35	Clay	(United States) Victoria Osuigwe	(Spain) Alicia Herrero Liñana (United States) Maribella Zamarripa	0–6, 2–6
Loss	4–6	Apr 2026	ITF Baotou, China	W50	Clay (i)	(China) Yuan Chengyiyi	(Kazakhstan) Zhibek Kulambayeva; Ekaterina Reyngold	1–6, 1–6
Win	5–6	Oct 2026	ITF Las Vegas, United States	W35	Hard	(Italy) Francesca Pace	(United States) Abigail Rencheli; Maria Sholokhova	7–6^{(7–5)}, 7–5
