= Valeriya Strakhova =

Ukrainian tennis player (born 1995)

Valeriya Strakhova Валерія Страхова
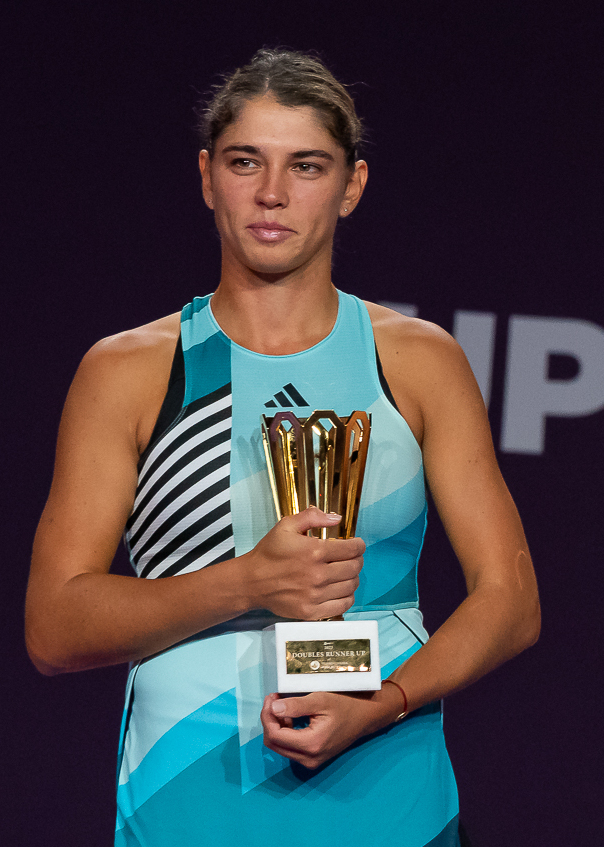
- Strakhova at 2023 Transylvania Open
- Full name: Valeriya Mykhaylivna Strakhova
- Country (sports): Ukraine
- Residence: Donetsk, Ukraine
- Born: 9 June 1995 (age 31) Kerch, Crimea
- Plays: Right (two-handed backhand)
- Prize money: $463,373

Singles
- Career record: 442–413
- Career titles: 15 ITF
- Highest ranking: No. 231 (1 February 2016)
- Current ranking: No. 400 (16 November 2026)

Grand Slam singles results
- US Open: Q2 (2016)

Doubles
- Career record: 496–302
- Career titles: 3 WTA 125, 50 ITF
- Highest ranking: No. 87 (21 September 2026)
- Current ranking: No. 100 (16 November 2026)
- Last updated on: 16 November 2026.

Valeriya Mykhaylivna Strakhova (Ukrainian: Валерія Михайлівна Страхова; born 9 June 1995) is a Ukrainian tennis player. She has a career-high WTA doubles ranking of No. 87, achieved on 21 September 2026, and a best rank in singles of No. 231, achieved on 1 February 2016. Strakhova has won three WTA 125 doubles titles.

== Career ==
=== 2015–2023: WTA Tour debut, first final ===
She made her WTA Tour main-draw debut at the 2015 Bucharest Open in the doubles event, partnering Anastasiya Vasylyeva.

At the 2023 Transylvania Open, she reached her first WTA Tour final in doubles, partnering with Léolia Jeanjean, losing to Jodie Burrage and Jil Teichmann.

=== 2024: Top 100 in doubles ===
Following a semifinal showing in doubles at the Guadalajara Open with Yvonne Cavallé Reimers, she reached the top-100 at world No. 97 in the doubles rankings on 23 September 2024. Partnering with Aliona Bolsova, Strakhova was runner-up in the doubles at the Bolivia Open, losing the final to Nuria Brancaccio and Leyre Romero Gormaz.

Playing alongside Nicole Fossa Huergo, she reached the doubles final at the WTA 125 MundoTenis Open in Brazil, losing to Maja Chwalińska and Laura Pigossi.

=== 2025: Maiden WTA 125 title ===
Teaming with Alicia Herrero Liñana, Strakhova won her first WTA 125 doubles title at the Querétaro Open, defeating Marian Gómez Pezuela Cano and Varvara Lepchenko in the final.

Partnering with Anastasia Tikhonova, she claimed her second WTA 125 doubles title at the Quito Open, overcoming Irene Burillo and Anastasia Zolotareva in the final.

=== 2026: Second WTA Tour final ===
Again playing with Anastasia Tikhonova, Strakhova reached her second WTA Tour doubles final at the Copa Colsanitas, losing to top seeds Caroline Dolehide and Irina Khromacheva in straight sets.

Teaming with Sofia Costoulas, she defeated Marian Gómez Pezuela Cano and Nadia Podoroska in the final of the Querétaro Open to claim her third WTA 125 doubles title.

== WTA Tour finals ==
=== Doubles: 2 (runner-ups) ===
Legend WTA 500 WTA 250 (0–2)	Finals by surface Hard (0–1) Clay (0–1)	Finals by setting Outdoor (0–1) Indoor (0–1)

Result	W–L	Date	Tournament	Tier	Surface	Partner	Opponents	Score
Loss	0–1	Oct 2023	Transylvania Open, Romania	WTA 250	Hard (i)	(France) Léolia Jeanjean	(United Kingdom) Jodie Burrage (Switzerland) Jil Teichmann	1–6, 4–6
Loss	0–2	Apr 2026	Copa Colsanitas, Colombia	WTA 250	Clay	Anastasia Tikhonova	(United States) Caroline Dolehide; Irina Khromacheva	6–7^{(5–7)}, 4–6

== WTA 125 finals ==
=== Doubles: 8 (3 titles, 5 runner-ups) ===
Result	W–L	Date	Tournament	Surface	Partner	Opponents	Score
Loss	0–1	Oct 2024	Santa Cruz Open, Bolivia	Clay	(Spain) Aliona Bolsova	(Italy) Nuria Brancaccio (Spain) Leyre Romero Gormaz	4–6, 4–6
Loss	0–2	Dec 2024	Florianópolis Open, Brazil	Clay	(Italy) Nicole Fossa Huergo	(Brazil) Laura Pigossi (Poland) Maja Chwalińska	6–7^{(3–7)}, 3–6
Win	1–2	Oct 2025	Querétaro Open, Mexico	Clay	(Spain) Alicia Herrero Liñana	(Mexico) Marian Gómez Pezuela Cano (United States) Varvara Lepchenko	7–5, 6–2
Loss	1–3	Nov 2025	Challenger Tucumán, Mexico	Clay	(Spain) Alicia Herrero Liñana	(Netherlands) Lian Tran; Anastasia Zolotareva	6–2, 1–6, [6–10]
Loss	1–4	Nov 2025	Copa Colina, Chile	Clay	(France) Léolia Jeanjean	(Spain) Sara Sorribes Tormo (Argentina) María Lourdes Carlé	2–6, 4–6
Win	2–4	Dec 2025	Quito Open, Ecuador	Clay	Anastasia Tikhonova	(Spain) Irene Burillo; Anastasia Zolotareva	6–4, 6–1
Win	3–4	Oct 2026	Querétaro Open, Mexico	Clay	(Belgium) Sofia Costoulas	(Mexico) Marian Gómez Pezuela Cano (Argentina) Nadia Podoroska	6–1, 6–1
Loss	3–5	Nov 2026	Copa Colina, Chile	Clay	Anastasia Tikhonova	(Slovenia) Veronika Erjavec (Kazakhstan) Zhibek Kulambayeva	4–6, 3–6

== ITF Circuit finals ==
=== Singles: 23 (15 titles, 8 runner-ups) ===
Legend W75 tournaments (0–1) W40/50 tournaments (1–1) W25/35 tournaments (3–3) W10/15 tournaments (11–3)	Finals by surface Hard (8–3) Clay (7–5)

Result	W–L	Date	Tournament	Tier	Surface	Opponent	Score
Win	1–0	Apr 2013	ITF Shymkent, Kazakhstan	W10	Clay	(Russia) Liubov Vasilyeva	7–5, 6–3
Loss	1–1	Jun 2014	ITF Amarante, Portugal	W10	Hard	(France) Océane Dodin	3–6, 2–6
Loss	1–2	Jul 2014	ITF Sharm El Sheikh, Egypt	W10	Hard	(Greece) Despoina Vogasari	5–7, 0–6
Win	2–2	Jul 2014	ITF Sharm El Sheikh	W10	Hard	(France) Pauline Payet	6–3, 6–2
Win	3–2	Aug 2014	ITF Sharm El Sheikh	W10	Hard	(Slovenia) Natalija Sipek	6–2, 6–3
Win	4–2	Aug 2014	ITF Sharm El Sheikh	W10	Hard	(Serbia) Vojislava Lukić	6–4, 6–1
Win	5–2	Aug 2014	ITF Sharm El Sheikh	W10	Hard	(United Kingdom) Harriet Dart	6–3, 6–3
Win	6–2	Mar 2015	ITF Ribeirão Preto, Brazil	W10	Clay	(Chile) Fernanda Brito	4–6, 7–5, 6–3
Win	7–2	Aug 2015	ITF Leipzig, Germany	W15	Clay	(Czech Republic) Jesika Malečková	7–6^{(7)}, 6–1
Win	8–2	Oct 2015	ITF Port El Kantaoui, Tunisia	W10	Hard	(Greece) Valentini Grammatikopoulou	6–2, 6–0
Win	9–2	Oct 2015	ITF Port El Kantaoui, Tunisia	W10	Hard	(France) Jessika Ponchet	6–2, 6–3
Loss	9–3	Oct 2015	ITF Bangkok, Thailand	W15	Hard	(Japan) Hiroko Kuwata	5–7, 4–6
Win	10–3	Nov 2015	ITF Port El Kantaoui, Tunisia	W10	Hard	(Germany) Katharina Hobgarski	7–6^{(3)}, 3–0 ret.
Loss	10–4	Jan 2016	ITF Aurangabad, India	W25	Clay	(Slovenia) Tadeja Majerič	4–6, 3–6
Win	11–4	Jul 2016	ITF Schio, Italy	W10	Clay	(Italy) Lucrezia Stefanini	6–3, 6–1
Win	12–4	Jul 2018	Open de Denain, France	W25	Clay	(United States) Allie Kiick	3–6, 7–6^{(5)}, 6–0
Loss	12–5	Oct 2022	ITF Tucumán, Argentina	W25	Clay	(Argentina) Paula Ormaechea	2–6, 3–6
Loss	12–6	Nov 2023	ITF Guadalajara, Mexico	W40	Clay	(Czech Republic) Brenda Fruhvirtová	1–6, 3–6
Win	13–6	Dec 2023	ITF Nairobi, Kenya	W25	Clay	(France) Émeline Dartron	6–4, 5–7, 6–1
Loss	13–7	May 2024	ITF Villach, Austria	W35	Clay	(Italy) Tatiana Pieri	4–6, 5–7
Loss	13–8	Aug 2024	Ladies Open Amstetten, Austria	W75	Clay	Elena Pridankina	0–6, 4–6
Win	14–8	Mar 2025	ITF Chihuahua, Mexico	W50	Clay	(Brazil) Carolina Alves	5–7, 6–2, 6–4
Win	15–8	Mar 2026	ITF Huamantla, Mexico	W35	Clay	(Italy) Miriana Tona	5–7, 6–1, 6–1

=== Doubles: 76 (50 titles, 26 runner-ups) ===
Legend W100 tournaments (1–1) W80 tournaments (0–1) W60/75 tournaments (5–4) W40/50 tournaments (8–4) W25/35 tournaments (26–11) W10/15 tournaments (10–5)	Finals by surface Hard (14–12) Clay (36–14)

Result	W–L	Date	Tournament	Tier	Surface	Partnering	Opponents	Score
Loss	0–1	Oct 2013	ITF Sharm El Sheikh, Egypt	W10	Hard	(Brazil) Karina Venditti	(Belgium) Elise Mertens (Poland) Sandra Zaniewska	4–6, 7–6^{(5)}, [10–12]
Win	1–1	Jun 2014	ITF Amarante, Portugal	W10	Hard	(Russia) Anastasiya Komardina	(Austria) Barbara Haas (Poland) Natalia Siedliska	3–6, 7–5, [10–6]
Loss	1–2	Sep 2014	Batumi Ladies Open, Georgia	W25	Hard	(Bulgaria) Aleksandrina Naydenova	(Belgium) An-Sophie Mestach (Poland) Sandra Zaniewska	1–6, 1–6
Win	2–2	Mar 2015	ITF Ribeirão Preto, Brazil	W10	Clay	(Brazil) Ingrid Martins	(Argentina) Melina Ferrero (Argentina) Carla Lucero	6–0, 6–3
Win	3–2	Jul 2015	ITF Sharm El Sheikh, Egypt	W10	Hard	(Russia) Margarita Lazareva	(Russia) Kseniia Bekker (India) Dhruthi Tatachar Venugopal	6–3, 6–1
Win	4–2	Aug 2015	ITF Sharm El Sheikh, Egypt	W10	Hard	(Russia) Margarita Lazareva	(Russia) Kseniia Bekker (Russia) Elina Nepliy	6–4, 6–1
Loss	4–3	Aug 2015	ITF Moscow, Russia	W25	Clay	(Ukraine) Oleksandra Korashvili	(Russia) Natela Dzalamidze (Russia) Veronika Kudermetova	3–6, 3–6
Win	5–3	Oct 2015	ITF Port El Kantaoui, Tunisia	W10	Hard	(Greece) Valentini Grammatikopoulou	(Portugal) Inês Murta (France) Pauline Payet	5–7, 6–3, [10–5]
Win	6–3	Oct 2015	ITF Port El Kantaoui, Tunisia	W10	Hard	(Bosnia and Herzegovina) Jelena Simić	(Belgium) Sofie Oyen (India) Kyra Shroff	6–3, 6–4
Loss	6–4	Oct 2015	ITF Bangkok, Thailand	W15	Hard	(Finland) Emma Laine	(Thailand) Nudnida Luangnam (Thailand) Peangtarn Plipuech	2–6, 3–6
Win	7–4	Oct 2015	ITF Bangkok, Thailand	W15	Hard	(Japan) Ayaka Okuno	(Thailand) Chompoothip Jundakate (Thailand) Peangtarn Plipuech	6–2, 7–6^{(2)}
Win	8–4	Dec 2015	Lagos Open, Nigeria	W25	Hard	(Russia) Margarita Lazareva	(Zimbabwe) Valeria Bhunu (Israel) Ester Masuri	6–1, 6–2
Win	9–4	Jan 2016	ITF Aurangabad, India	W25	Clay	(Russia) Margarita Lazareva	(Turkey) Melis Sezer (Russia) Ekaterina Yashina	6–1, 7–6^{(2)}
Win	10–4	May 2016	Nana Trophy Tunis, Tunisia	W50	Clay	(Australia) Arina Rodionova	(Russia) Irina Khromacheva (Turkey) İpek Soylu	6–1, 6–2
Win	11–4	Jul 2016	Reinert Open Versmold, Germany	W50	Clay	(Russia) Natela Dzalamidze	(Japan) Kanae Hisami (Japan) Kotomi Takahata	6–2, 6–1
Loss	11–5	Mar 2017	ITF Sharm El Sheikh, Egypt	W15	Clay	(Russia) Yana Sizikova	(Russia) Olga Doroshina (Russia) Polina Monova	1–6, 1–6
Loss	11–6	May 2017	Torneo Conchita Martínez, Spain	W25	Hard	(Georgia (country)) Sofia Shapatava	(Venezuela) Andrea Gámiz (Spain) Georgina García Pérez	3–6, 4–6
Win	12–6	May 2017	Solgironès Open, Spain	W25	Clay	(Russia) Olesya Pervushina	(Romania) Jaqueline Cristian (Mexico) Renata Zarazúa	7–5, 6–2
Win	13–6	May 2017	ITF Santarém, Portugal	W15	Hard	(Russia) Valeria Savinykh	(Spain) Cristina Bucșa (Russia) Ksenia Kuznetsova	6–3, 6–2
Loss	13–7	Jun 2017	ITF Andijan, Uzbekistan	W25	Hard	(Uzbekistan) Akgul Amanmuradova	(Russia) Olga Doroshina (Russia) Polina Monova	2–6, 0–6
Loss	13–8	Oct 2017	Lagos Open, Nigeria	W25	Hard	(Switzerland) Conny Perrin	(Turkey) Ayla Aksu (Montenegro) Ana Veselinović	4–6, 2–6
Win	14–8	Oct 2017	Lagos Open, Nigeria	W25	Hard	(Switzerland) Conny Perrin	(Slovenia) Tadeja Majerič (United Kingdom) Tiffany William	6–1, 6–2
Win	15–8	Aug 2018	ITF Almaty, Kazakhstan	W25	Clay	(Slovakia) Tereza Mihaliková	(Russia) Polina Monova (Russia) Yana Sizikova	6–1, 6–2
Win	16–8	Apr 2019	ITF Pula, Italy	W25	Clay	(Germany) Katharina Hobgarski	(Italy) Giorgia Marchetti (Italy) Camilla Rosatello	1–6, 6–2, [10–5]
Loss	16–9	Sep 2019	Meitar Open, Israel	W60	Clay	(Russia) Anastasia Gasanova	(Russia) Sofya Lansere (Russia) Kamilla Rakhimova	6–4, 4–6, [3–10]
Loss	16–10	Nov 2019	ITF Bhopal, India	W25	Hard	(Latvia) Diāna Marcinkēviča	(India) Rutuja Bhosale (United Kingdom) Emily Webley-Smith	4–6, 5–7
Loss	16–11	Sep 2020	ITF Santarém, Portugal	W15	Hard	(Poland) Martyna Kubka	(Portugal) Francisca Jorge (Spain) Olga Parres Azcoitia	2–6, 3–6
Loss	16–12	Oct 2020	ITF Sharm El Sheikh, Egypt	W15	Hard	(Russia) Anastasia Gasanova	(Russia) Ksenia Laskutova (Russia) Daria Mishina	5–7, 7–6^{(6)}, [10–4]
Win	17–12	Dec 2020	ITF Antalya, Turkey	W15	Clay	(Georgia (country)) Sofia Shapatava	(Germany) Julia Kimmelmann (Turkey) İlay Yörük	6–4, 6–4
Win	18–12	Jun 2021	Open de Denain, France	W25	Clay	(Kazakhstan) Anna Danilina	(Hungary) Dalma Gálfi (Argentina) Paula Ormaechea	7–5, 3–6, [10–4]
Win	19–12	Jul 2021	Telavi Open, Georgia	W25	Clay	(North Macedonia) Lina Gjorcheska	(Argentina) Victoria Bosio (Italy) Angelica Moratelli	4–6, 6–4, [10–5]
Win	20–12	Jul 2021	Reinert Open Versmold, Germany (2)	W60	Clay	(Kazakhstan) Anna Danilina	(Sweden) Mirjam Björklund (Australia) Jaimee Fourlis	4–6, 7–5, [10–4]
Win	21–12	Aug 2021	ITF Koksijde, Belgium	W25	Clay	(North Macedonia) Lina Gjorcheska	(Greece) Valentini Grammatikopoulou (Russia) Valentina Ivakhnenko	6–4, 6–4
Win	22–12	Aug 2021	ITF Braunschweig, Germany	W25	Clay	(Germany) Katharina Hobgarski	(Austria) Tamira Paszek (United States) Chiara Scholl	3–6, 6–2, [12–10]
Win	23–12	Sep 2021	ITF Saint-Palais-sur-Mer, France	W25	Clay	(Kazakhstan) Anna Danilina	(France) Audrey Albié (France) Léolia Jeanjean	6–7^{(7)}, 6–2, [10–4]
Loss	23–13	Nov 2021	Aberto da República, Brazil	W60	Clay	(Australia) Olivia Tjandramulia	(Brazil) Carolina Alves (Argentina) María Lourdes Carlé	2–6, 1–6
Win	24–13	Dec 2021	Pune Tennis Championships, India	W25	Hard	(Kazakhstan) Anna Danilina	(Japan) Funa Kozaki (Japan) Misaki Matsuda	6–0, 2–6, [10–5]
Loss	24–14	Jan 2022	ITF Navi Mumbai, India	W25	Hard	(Kazakhstan) Anna Danilina	(Kazakhstan) Zhibek Kulambayeva (Latvia) Diāna Marcinkēviča	3–6, 6–4, [6–10]
Win	25–14	Apr 2022	ITF Calvi, France	W25+H	Hard	Sofya Lansere	(France) Estelle Cascino (France) Jessika Ponchet	6–4, 7–6^{(5)}
Loss	25–15	May 2022	ITF Platja d'Aro, Spain	W25	Clay	(Netherlands) Isabelle Haverlag	(Spain) Ángela Fita Boluda (Venezuela) Andrea Gámiz	4–6, 6–3, [3–10]
Win	26–15	Jun 2022	Open de Biarritz, France	W60	Clay	(Kazakhstan) Anna Danilina	(Argentina) María Lourdes Carlé; Maria Timofeeva	2–6, 6–3, [14–12]
Win	27–15	Jun 2022	Open de Denain, France	W25	Clay	(Germany) Katharina Hobgarski	(Bosnia and Herzegovina) Anita Wagner (Latvia) Kamilla Bartone	6–0, 6–4
Win	28–15	Jul 2022	ITF Perugia, Italy	W25	Clay	(Slovenia) Veronika Erjavec	(Spain) Ángela Fita Boluda (Italy) Angelica Moratelli	w/o
Win	29–15	Aug 2022	ITF Pärnu, Estonia	W25	Clay	(Lithuania) Justina Mikulskytė	(Greece) Eleni Christofi (Bulgaria) Gergana Topalova	6–2, 4–6, [10–8]
Win	30–15	Aug 2022	ITF Vrnjačka Banja, Serbia	W25	Clay	(Romania) Cristina Dinu	(United Kingdom) Emily Appleton (India) Prarthana Thombare	6–1, 4–6, [10–8]
Loss	30–16	Sep 2022	ITF Saint-Palais-sur-Mer, France	W25	Clay	(France) Marine Partaud	(Belgium) Magali Kempen (China) Lu Jiajing	4–6, 4–6
Win	31–16	Sep 2022	ITF Jablonec nad Nisou, Czech Republic	W25	Clay	(Kazakhstan) Anna Danilina	(Germany) Lena Papadakis (Czech Republic) Anna Sisková	7–5, 6–1
Win	32–16	Oct 2022	ITF Tucumán, Argentina	W25	Clay	(Netherlands) Lexie Stevens	(Mexico) Marian Gómez Pezuela Cano (Argentina) Luciana Moyano	6–3, 6–2
Win	33–16	Oct 2022	ITF Bucaramanga, Colombia	W15	Clay	(Netherlands) Lexie Stevens	(Peru) Romina Ccuno (Colombia) María Paulina Pérez	7–6^{(4)}, 6–3
Loss	33–17	Nov 2022	Barranquilla Open, Colombia	W60	Clay	(Brazil) Carolina Alves	(Ukraine) Kateryna Volodko (Hungary) Tímea Babos	6–3, 5–7, [7–10]
Win	34–17	Jan 2023	ITF Buenos Aires, Argentina	W25	Clay	Amina Anshba	(Colombia) Yuliana Lizarazo (Colombia) María Paulina Pérez	1–6, 6–4, [10–7]
Win	35–17	Jan 2023	ITF Buenos Aires, Argentina	W25	Clay	Amina Anshba	(Colombia) María Herazo González (Peru) Romina Ccuno	6–1, 6–2
Win	36–17	Mar 2023	ITF Tucumán, Argentina	W25	Clay	(Latvia) Daniela Vismane	(Argentina) Guillermina Naya (Argentina) Julia Riera	6–3, 3–6, [13–11]
Win	37–17	Mar 2023	ITF Anapoima, Colombia	W40	Clay	Irina Khromacheva	(Venezuela) Andrea Gámiz (Netherlands) Eva Vedder	6–0, 1–6, [10–4]
Win	38–17	Mar 2023	ITF Mosquera, Colombia	W25	Clay	Irina Khromacheva	(Italy) Silvia Ambrosio (Germany) Lena Papadakis	5–7, 7–6^{(3)}, [10–8]
Loss	38–18	Apr 2023	ITF Istanbul, Turkiye	W60	Clay	(Australia) Priscilla Hon	(Slovenia) Dalila Jakupović; Irina Khromacheva	6–7^{(3)}, 4–6
Win	39–18	Jun 2023	ITF Ystad, Sweden	W40	Clay	(Australia) Astra Sharma	(Switzerland) Jenny Dürst (Sweden) Fanny Östlund	4–6, 7–6^{(3)}, [11–9]
Win	40–18	Jul 2023	ITF Prokuplje, Serbia	W25	Clay	(Romania) Cristina Dinu	Polina Leykina (Bulgaria) Julia Stamatova	4–6, 6–2, [10–8]
Win	41–18	Aug 2023	ITF Feira de Santana, Brazil	W60	Hard	(France) Léolia Jeanjean	(United States) Haley Giavara (United States) Abigail Rencheli	7–5, 6–4
Loss	41–19	Aug 2023	ITF Brasília, Brazil	W80	Hard	(United Kingdom) Eden Silva	(Brazil) Carolina Alves (Argentina) Julia Riera	2–6, 3–6
Win	42–19	Sep 2023	ITF Saint-Palais-sur-Mer, France	W40	Clay	(United Kingdom) Emily Appleton	(France) Victoria Muntean (India) Vasanti Shinde	6–1, 6–2
Win	43–19	Sep 2023	ITF Slobozia, Romania	W25	Clay	(Romania) Oana Gavrilă	(Romania) Ilona Georgiana Ghioroaie (Romania) Andreea Prisăcariu	6–2, 7–5
Win	44–19	Sep 2023	ITF Kursumlijska Banja, Serbia	W40	Clay	(Australia) Astra Sharma	Anastasia Gasanova; Ekaterina Makarova	6–1, 6–4
Win	45–19	Dec 2023	ITF Nairobi, Kenya	W25	Clay	(Sweden) Fanny Östlund	(Japan) Nagomi Higashitani (Kenya) Angella Okutoyi	6–4, 7–6^{(5)}
Loss	45–20	Jan 2024	ITF Antalya, Turkiye	W35	Clay	Amina Anshba	(Romania) Cristina Dinu (Slovenia) Nika Radišić	2–6, 6–3, [11–13]
Loss	45–21	May 2024	Bonita Springs Championship, United States	W100	Clay	(Greece) Valentini Grammatikopoulou	(Hungary) Fanny Stollár (New Zealand) Lulu Sun	4–6, 5–7
Win	46–21	May 2024	ITF Otočec, Slovenia	W50	Clay	(Georgia (country)) Ekaterine Gorgodze	(Australia) Maya Joint (United States) Rasheeda McAdoo	3–6, 6–4, [10–5]
Win	47–21	Jun 2024	ITF Otočec, Slovenia	W50	Clay	(Georgia (country)) Ekaterine Gorgodze	Anastasiia Gureva; Anastasia Kovaleva	4–6, 6–2, [10–4]
Win	48–21	Oct 2025	Edmond Open, United States	W100	Hard	Anastasia Tikhonova	(Australia) Olivia Gadecki (Poland) Olivia Lincer	6–3, 6–7^{(2)}, [10-8]
Win	49–21	Jun 2026	ITF Haskovo, Bulgaria	W50	Clay	(Kazakhstan) Zhibek Kulambayeva	(Greece) Martha Matoula (United States) Hibah Shaikh	6–0, 6–4
Loss	49–22	Aug 2026	Hamburg Ladies Cup, Germany	W50	Clay	Anastasia Tikhonova	(Japan) Momoko Kobori (Japan) Ayano Shimizu	4–6, 2–6
Loss	49–23	Aug 2026	Prague Open, Czechia	W50	Clay	Anastasia Tikhonova	(Czech Republic) Alena Kovačková (Czech Republic) Jana Kovačková	2–6, 3–6
Loss	49–24	Aug 2026	Verbier Open, Switzerland	W35	Clay	(Greece) Valentini Grammatikopoulou	(France) Tiphanie Lemaître (Kenya) Angella Okutoyi	4–6, 7–6^{(3)}, [5–10]
Loss	49–25	Aug 2026	ITF Saint-Palais-sur-Mer, France	W50	Clay	(Netherlands) Demi Tran	(Finland) Laura Hietaranta (Netherlands) Sarah van Emst	2–6, 4–6
Loss	49–26	Oct 2026	ITF Lexington, United States	W50	Hard	(United States) Dalayna Hewitt	(Morocco) Diae El Jardi (India) Sahaja Yamalapalli	6–2, 5–7, [10–12]
Win	50–26	Nov 2026	ITF Chihuahua, Mexico	W50	Hard	Anastasia Tikhonova	(Canada) Kayla Cross (Greece) Despina Papamichail	6–0, 7–6^{(4)}
