= María Fernanda Navarro Oliva =

Mexican tennis player (born 1996)

Fernanda Navarro
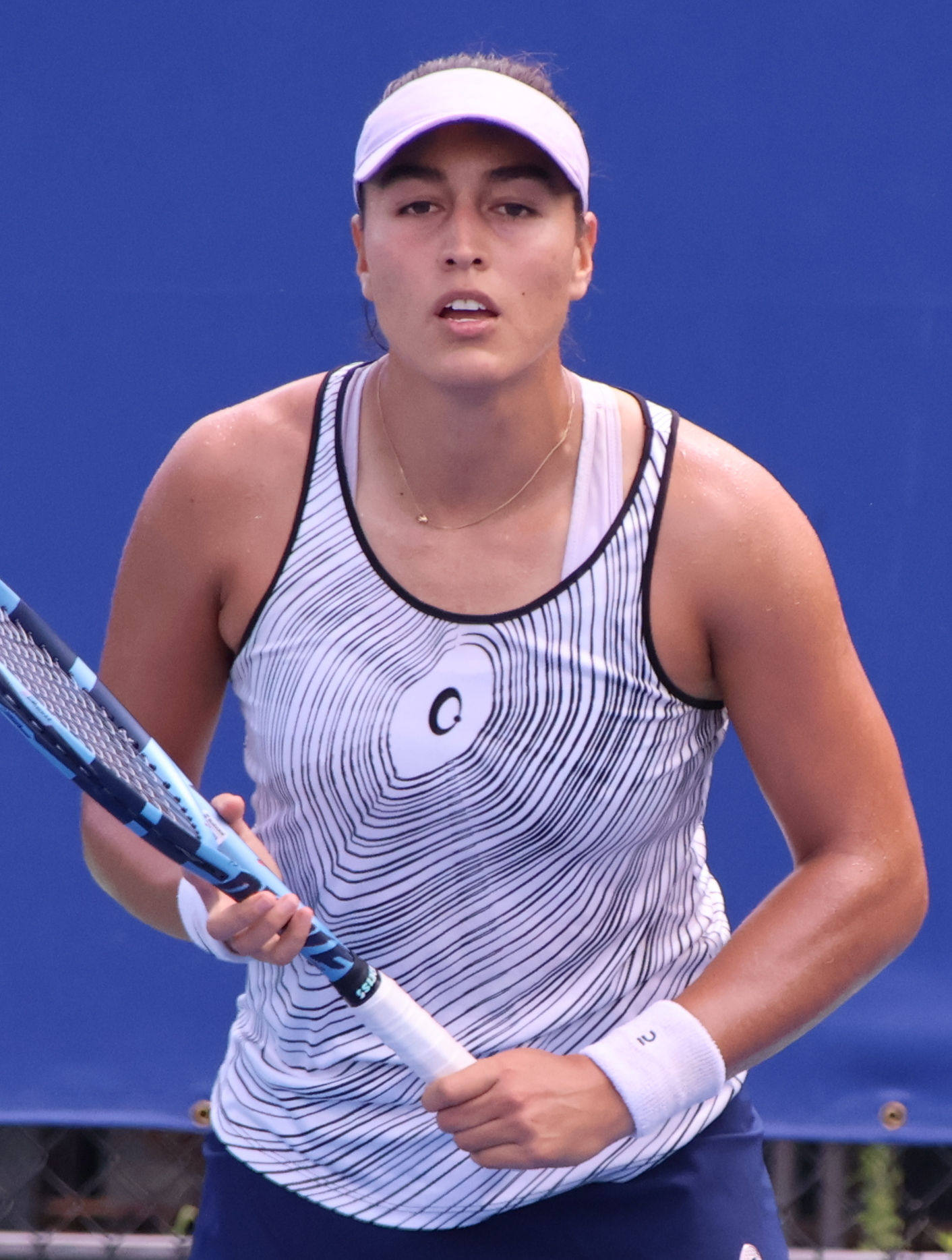
- Navarro in 2026
- Full name: María Fernanda Navarro Oliva
- Country (sports): Mexico
- Born: 22 June 1996 (age 30) Guadalajara, Mexico
- College: Clemson Tigers
- Coach: Thomas Alm
- Prize money: $70,811

Singles
- Career record: 119–126
- Highest ranking: No. 534 (6 April 2026)
- Current ranking: No. 551 (25 May 2026)

Doubles
- Career record: 99–100
- Career titles: 5 ITF
- Highest ranking: No. 379 (25 May 2026)
- Current ranking: No. 379 (25 May 2026)
- Last updated on: 28 May 2026.

María Fernanda Navarro Oliva (born 22 June 1996), also known as Fernanda Navarro, is a Mexican tennis player.

She reached her best singles ranking of world No. 534 in April 2026, and peaked at No. 379 in the doubles rankings on 25 May 2026. On the ITF Circuit, she has won five titles in doubles.

Navarro Oliva made her main-draw debut on the WTA Tour in the doubles event of the 2023 Guadalajara Open, partnering with Eugenie Bouchard.

She played college tennis at Clemson University.

== ITF Circuit finals ==
=== Singles: 2 (1 title, 1 runner-up) ===
Legend W15 tournaments (1–1)	Finals by surface Hard (1–1)

Result	W–L	Date	Tournament	Tier	Surface	Opponent	Score
Win	1–0	Jul 2025	ITF Huamantla, Mexico	W15	Hard	Maria Sholokhova	6–7^{(1)}, 6–2, 6–4
Loss	1–1	Aug 2025	ITF Huamantla, Mexico	W15	Hard	Maria Sholokhova	4–6, 6–1, 4–6

=== Doubles: 21 (8 titles, 13 runner-ups) ===
Legend W50 tournaments (1–2) W25/35 tournaments (0–6) W10/15 tournaments (7–5)	Finals by surface Hard (5–11) Clay (3–2)

Result	W–L	Date	Tournament	Tier	Surface	Partner	Opponents	Score
Win	1–0	Jul 2014	ITF Quintana Roo, Mexico	W10	Hard	(Spain) Loreto Alonso Martínez	(Mexico) Carolina Betancourt (Paraguay) Ana Paula Neffa de los Ríos	6–4, 6–2
Win	2–0	Apr 2022	ITF Sharm El Sheikh, Egypt	W15	Hard	(Netherlands) Gabriella Mujan	(United States) Dasha Ivanova (Netherlands) Stéphanie Visscher	6–3, 7–5
Loss	2–1	Jul 2022	ITF El Espinar, Spain	W25	Hard	(Spain) Marta González Encinas	(Hong Kong) Eudice Chong (Hong Kong) Cody Wong	2–6, 6–4, [6–10]
Win	3–1	Sep 2022	ITF Cancún, Mexico	W15	Hard	(United States) Lauren Proctor	(Mexico) Jessica Hinojosa Gómez (Mexico) Victoria Rodríguez	6–3, 5–7, [10–7]
Loss	3–2	Nov 2022	ITF Ortisei, Italy	W25	Hard (i)	(United States) Taylor Ng	(Russia) Ekaterina Ovcharenko (Greece) Sapfo Sakellaridi	2–6, 4–6
Loss	3–3	Jun 2023	ITF Los Angeles, United States	W15	Hard	(United States) Brandy Walker	(Japan) Rinon Okuwaki (China) Tian Fangran	5–7, 3–6
Loss	3–4	Nov 2023	ITF Santo Domingo, Dominican Republic	W25	Hard	(Sweden) Jacqueline Cabaj Awad	(Serbia) Katarina Jokić (United States) Taylor Ng	walkover
Loss	3–5	Oct 2024	ITF Huamantla, Mexico	W15	Hard	(Mexico) Claudia Sofía Martínez	(United States) Malaika Rapolu (Estonia) Liisa Varul	6–7^{(4)}, 6–4, [7–10]
Loss	3–6	Oct 2024	ITF Huamantla, Mexico	W15	Hard	(Mexico) Claudia Sofía Martínez	(United States) Ema Burgić (Mexico) Sabastiani León	6–3, 2–6, [6–10]
Loss	3–7	Jul 2025	ITF Huamantla, Mexico	W15	Hard	(Mexico) Jéssica Hinojosa Gómez	(United States) Dalayna Hewitt (United States) Dasha Ivanova	5–7, 6–4, [7–10]
Loss	3–8	Jul 2025	ITF Huamantla, Mexico	W15	Hard	(Mexico) Jéssica Hinojosa Gómez	(Mexico) Sabastiani León (Russia) Maria Sholokhova	2–6, 2–6
Win	4–8	Oct 2025	ITF Santa Tecla, El Salvador	W15	Hard	(Mexico) Jéssica Hinojosa Gómez	(Colombia) María Herazo González (Netherlands) Merel Hoedt	7–5, 2–6, [10–7]
Loss	4–9	Nov 2025	ITF Chihuahua, Mexico	W50	Hard	(Canada) Alexandra Vagramov	(Canada) Ariana Arseneault (Canada) Raphaëlle Lacasse	6–2, 6–7^{(4)}, [6–10]
Loss	4–10	Jan 2026	ITF Buenos Aires, Argentina	W50	Clay	(United States) Anna Rogers	(Argentina) Luciana Moyano (Ecuador) Camila Romero	6–1, 6–7^{(4)}, [10–12]
Win	5–10	Apr 2026	ITF Oegstgeest, Netherlands	W15	Clay	(Belgium) Kaat Coppez	(Sweden) Ida Johansson (Poland) Marcelina Podlińska	6–4, 6–7^{(1)}, [12–10]
Loss	5–11	May 2026	ITF Båstad, Sweden	W35	Clay	(Colombia) María Paulina Pérez	(Netherlands) Britt du Pree (Netherlands) Sarah van Emst	4–6, 3–4 ret.
Loss	5–12	Aug 2026	ITF Southaven, United States	W35	Hard	(Mexico) Victoria Rodríguez	(Romania) Carmen Andreea Herea (Ukraine) Anita Sahdiieva	3–6, 7–5, [6–10]
Loss	5–13	Aug 2026	ITF Barueri, Brazil	W35	Hard	(Ecuador) Camila Romero	(Venezuela) Sofía Cabezas Domínguez (Brazil) Ana Candiotto	4–6, 2–6
Win	6–13	Aug 2026	ITF Luján, Argentina	W15	Clay	(Venezuela) Sofía Cabezas Domínguez	(Argentina) Luciana Moyano (Ecuador) Camila Romero	6–2, 3–6, [10–5]
Win	7–13	Sep 2026	ITF Pilar, Argentina	W15	Clay	(Venezuela) Sofía Cabezas Domínguez	(Argentina) Luciana Moyano (Ecuador) Camila Romero	6–3, 6–3
Win	8–13	Nov 2026	ITF Huamantla, Mexico	W50	Hard	(Poland) Zuzanna Pawlikowska	(Mexico) Victoria Rodríguez (Netherlands) Demi Tran	6–4, 4–6, [10–2]
