= Alicia Herrero Liñana =

Spanish tennis player (born 1998)

- Country (sports): Spain
- Born: 29 December 1998 (age 27) Manuel, Valencia, Spain
- Plays: Right (two-handed backhand)
- Coach: Carlos Cobos
- Prize money: $109,594

Singles
- Career record: 155–128
- Career titles: 1 ITF
- Highest ranking: No. 223 (21 September 2026)
- Current ranking: No. 223 (21 September 2026)

Doubles
- Career record: 142–75
- Career titles: 2 WTA 125, 15 ITF
- Highest ranking: No. 95 (2 February 2026)
- Current ranking: No. 126 (21 September 2026)
- Last updated on: 20 September 2026.

Alicia Herrero Liñana (born 29 December 1998) is a Spanish tennis player. She has a career-high WTA singles ranking of world No. 223, achieved in September 2026 and a doubles ranking of No. 95, achieved in February 2026.

Herrero Liñana has won one WTA 125 doubles title as well as one singles and 15 doubles titles on the ITF Circuit.

She attended Baylor University and played college tennis for the Baylor Bears.

== Career ==
Teaming with Valeriya Strakhova, she won her first WTA 125 doubles title at the 2025 Querétaro Open, defeating Marian Gómez Pezuela Cano and Varvara Lepchenko in the final.

== WTA 125 finals ==
=== Singles: 1 (runner-up) ===
Result	W–L	Date	Tournament	Surface	Opponent	Score
Loss	0–1	Sep 2026	Internacional de Valencia, Spain	Clay	(France) Clara Burel	6–4, 0–6, 2–6

=== Doubles: 3 (2 titles, 1 runner-up) ===
Result	W–L	Date	Tournament	Surface	Partner	Opponents	Score
Win	1–0	Oct 2025	Querétaro Open, Mexico	Clay	(Ukraine) Valeriya Strakhova	(Mexico) Marian Gómez Pezuela Cano (United States) Varvara Lepchenko	7–5, 6–2
Win	2–0	Oct 2025	Buenos Aires Open, Argentina	Clay	(Brazil) Laura Pigossi	(Czech Republic) Laura Samson (Argentina) Nicole Fossa Huergo	6-2, 7-6
Loss	2–1	Nov 2025	Challenger Tucumán, Mexico	Clay	(Ukraine) Valeriya Strakhova	(Netherlands) Lian Tran; Anastasia Zolotareva	6–2, 1–6, [6–10]

== ITF Circuit finals ==
=== Singles: 1 (title) ===
Legend W35 tournaments (1–0)	Finals by surface Clay (1–0)

Result	W–L	Date	Tournament	Tier	Surface	Opponent	Score
Win	1–0	Apr 2025	ITF Charlotte, United States	W35	Clay	(United States) Ayana Akli	6–1, 7–6^{(1)}

=== Doubles: 27 (16 titles, 11 runner-ups) ===
Legend $100,000 tournaments W75 tournaments W50 tournaments W25/35 tournaments W10/15 tournaments	Finals by surface Hard (8–2) Clay (8–9)

Result	W–L	Date	Tournament	Tier	Surface	Partner	Opponents	Score
Loss	0–1	Nov 2015	ITF Vinaròs, Spain	W10	Clay	(Russia) Ksenija Sharifova	(Spain) Estrella Cabeza Candela (Ukraine) Oleksandra Korashvili	2–6, 6–4, [5–10]
Loss	0–2	Nov 2016	Open de Valencia, Spain	W25	Clay	(Russia) Ksenija Sharifova	(North Macedonia) Lina Gjorcheska (Kazakhstan) Galina Voskoboeva	0–6, 0–6
Loss	0–3	May 2018	ITF Hammamet, Tunisia	W15	Clay	(Japan) Mana Ayukawa	(Romania) Cristina Adamescu (Romania) Ioana Loredana Roșca	4–6, 3–6
Win	1–3	Dec 2021	ITF Cancún, Mexico	W15	Hard	(Argentina) Melany Krywoj	(Japan) Minami Akiyama (Japan) Miho Kuramochi	6–4, 6–2
Win	2–3	Jun 2022	ITF Santo Domingo, Dominican Republic	W25	Hard	(Argentina) Melany Krywoj	(Czech Republic) Gabriela Knutson (Slovakia) Katarína Strešnaková	6–2, 6–4
Loss	2–4	Jul 2022	ITF Cancún, Mexico	W15	Hard	(Argentina) Melany Krywoj	(Mexico) Jessica Hinojosa Gómez (Mexico) Victoria Rodríguez	2–6, 5–7
Loss	2–5	Jul 2022	ITF Cancún, Mexico	W15	Hard	(Argentina) Melany Krywoj	(Japan) Hikaru Sato (Canada) Vanessa Wong	2–6, 4–6
Win	3–5	Nov 2022	ITF Naples, United States	W15	Hard	Maria Kononova	(Argentina) Melany Krywoj (Slovakia) Vanda Vargová	4–6, 6–3, [10–7]
Loss	3–6	Jul 2023	ITF Punta Cana, Dominican Republic	W25	Clay	(Argentina) Melany Krywoj	(United States) Victoria Osuigwe (United States) Whitney Osuigwe	1–6, 6–1, [7–10]
Win	4–6	Mar 2024	ITF Córdoba, Argentina	W15	Clay	(Argentina) Melany Krywoj	(Ecuador) Camila Romero (Argentina) Candela Vázquez	6–2, 5–7, [10–5]
Win	5–6	Apr 2024	ITF Jackson, United States	W35	Clay	(Argentina) Melany Krywoj	(United States) Victoria Flores (Japan) Hiroko Kuwata	6–3, 2–6, [10–7]
Loss	5–7	Apr 2024	ITF Boca Raton, United States	W35	Clay	(Argentina) Melany Krywoj	Maria Kononova (United States) Rasheeda McAdoo	6–2, 4–6, [5–10]
Win	6–7	Jun 2024	Sumter Pro Open, United States	W75	Hard	(Argentina) Melany Krywoj	(United States) Sophie Chang (United States) Dalayna Hewitt	6–3, 6–3
Win	7–7	Jun 2024	Wichita Open, United States	W35	Hard	(Argentina) Melany Krywoj	(United States) Ashton Bowers (United States) Sophia Webster	6–3, 6–3
Win	8–7	Jul 2024	Evansville Classic, United States	W75	Hard	(Argentina) Melany Krywoj	(Japan) Hiroko Kuwata (India) Sahaja Yamalapalli	6–2, 6–0
Win	9–7	Aug 2024	ITF Pilar, Argentina	W35	Clay	(Argentina) Melany Krywoj	(Colombia) María Paulina Pérez (Bolivia) Noelia Zeballos	6–1, 6–3
Loss	9–8	Aug 2024	ITF Arequipa, Peru	W35	Clay	(United States) Gabriella Price	(Peru) Dana Guzmán (France) Tiantsoa Rakotomanga Rajaonah	6–3, 4–6, [6–10]
Win	10–8	Nov 2024	ITF Boca Raton, United States	W50	Hard	(United States) Anna Rogers	(Russia) Maria Kononova (Russia) Maria Kozyreva	6–2, 6–1
Loss	10–9	Mar 2025	Vacaria Open, Brazil	W50	Clay (i)	(United States) Robin Anderson	(Czech Republic) Michaela Bayerlová (Italy) Miriana Tona	7–6^{(4)}, 6–7^{(5)}, [7–10]
Win	11–9	Mar 2025	Vacaria Open 2, Brazil	W75	Clay (i)	(United States) Robin Anderson	(Greece) Despina Papamichail (Argentina) Julia Riera	7–5, 6–4
Win	12–9	Mar 2025	ITF Jackson, United States	W35	Clay	(United States) Maribella Zamarripa	(Italy) Diletta Cherubini (United States) Victoria Osuigwe	6–0, 6–2
Loss	12–10	May 2025	ITF Pelham, United States	W50	Clay	(United States) Anna Rogers	(United Kingdom) Madeleine Brooks (Australia) Petra Hule	4–6, 6–7^{(4)}
Win	13–10	Jun 2025	ITF Périgueux, France	W35	Clay	(Spain) Lucía Cortez Llorca	(Canada) Françoise Abanda (France) Marie Mattel	6–1, 6–4
Loss	13–11	Mar 2026	ITF Sabadell, Spain	W35	Clay	(Spain) Lucía Cortez Llorca	(Spain) Aliona Bolsova (Spain) Ángela Fita Boluda	4–6, 1–6
Win	14–11	Apr 2026	Charlottesville Open, United States	W100	Clay	(United States) Anna Rogers	(United States) Eryn Cayetano (United States) Allura Zamarripa	6–1, 6–3
Win	15–11	May 2026	Pelham Pro Classic, United States	W50	Clay	(United States) Anna Rogers	(United States) Kaitlyn Carnicella (United States) Capucine Jauffret	6–2, 6–1
Win	16–11	Oct 2026	Edmond Open, United States	W100	Hard	(United States) Allura Zamarripa	(United Kingdom) Sofia Johnson (United States) Malaika Rapolu	6–1, 6–2
