= 2026 Zaragoza Open =

Tennis tournament

- Date: 25–31 May 2026
- Edition: 4th
- Category: ITF Women's World Tennis Tour
- Prize money: $60,000
- Surface: Clay / Outdoor
- Location: Zaragoza, Spain

Champions

Singles
- (Italy) Jennifer Ruggeri

Doubles
- (Spain) Yvonne Cavallé Reimers / (Spain) Ángela Fita Boluda
- Zaragoza Open

The 2026 Zaragoza Open is a professional tennis tournament played on outdoor clay courts. It is the fourth edition of the tournament, which is part of the 2026 ITF Women's World Tennis Tour. It took place in Zaragoza, Spain, between 25 and 31 May 2026.

== Champions ==
=== Singles ===
- (Italy) Jennifer Ruggeri def. (United States) Kayla Day, 3–6, 6–3, 7–6^{(7–3)}.

=== Doubles ===
- (Spain) Yvonne Cavallé Reimers / (Spain) Ángela Fita Boluda def. (United States) Ayana Akli / (Belgium) Lara Salden, 6–4, 6–4.

== Singles main draw entrants ==
=== Seeds ===
Country	Player	Rank	Seed
ESP	Andrea Lázaro García	140	1
BEL	Sofia Costoulas	144	2
USA	Kayla Day	145	3
~~NED~~	~~Arantxa Rus~~	~~149~~	~~4~~
TPE	Joanna Garland	151	5
ESP	Leyre Romero Gormaz	159	6
USA	Elizabeth Mandlik	162	7
ARG	Luisina Giovannini	189	8
ESP	Guiomar Maristany	190	9

- Rankings are as of 18 May 2026.

=== Other entrants ===
The following players received wildcards into the singles main draw:

- (Spain) Celia Anson Sánchez
- (Spain) Carlota Martínez Círez
- (Spain) Andrea Palazón Lacasa
- (Spain) Aran Teixidó García

The following players received entry from the qualifying draw:

- (Germany) Mina Hodzic
- (Spain) María Martínez Vaquero
- (Italy) Angelica Moratelli
- (France) Lucie Nguyen Tan
- (Belgium) Jana Otzipka
- (Argentina) Nadia Podoroska
- (Spain) Alba Rey García
- (Italy) Jennifer Ruggeri

The following players received entry as lucky losers:

- (Spain) Celia Cerviño Ruiz
- (France) Delia Gaillard
