= 2026 Zaragoza Open – Singles =

Singles
- 2026 Zaragoza Open

Final
- Champion: (Italy) Jennifer Ruggeri
- Runner-up: (United States) Kayla Day
- Score: 3–6, 6–3, 7–6^{(7–3)}

Events
Singles	Doubles
- Zaragoza Open

Anastasia Zakharova was the defending champion but chose to compete at the French Open instead.

Jennifer Ruggeri won the title, defeating Kayla Day 3–6, 6–3, 7–6^{(7–3)} in the final.

== Seeds ==
1. (Spain) Andrea Lázaro García (quarterfinals)
2. (Belgium) Sofia Costoulas (second round)
3. (United States) Kayla Day (final)
4. (Netherlands) Arantxa Rus (withdrew)
5. (Chinese Taipei) Joanna Garland (second round)
6. (Spain) Leyre Romero Gormaz (first round)
7. (United States) Elizabeth Mandlik (quarterfinals)
8. (Argentina) Luisina Giovannini (semifinals)
9. (Spain) Guiomar Maristany (semifinals)

== Draw ==
Key

- Q = Qualifier
- WC = Wild card
- LL = Lucky loser
- Alt = Alternate
- ITF = ITF entry
- PR = Protected ranking
- SR = Special ranking
- SE = Special exempt
- JE = Junior exempt
- JR = Junior Accelerator Programme entrant
- CO = College Accelerator Programme entrant
- NG = Next Gen Accelerator Program entrant
- w/o = Walkover
- r = Retired
- d = Defaulted

=== Finals ===
Semifinals
Q	(Italy) Jennifer Ruggeri	7	6
9	(Spain) Guiomar Maristany	5	4
3	(United States) Kayla Day	6	6
8	(Argentina) Luisina Giovannini	4	4

Final
Q	(Italy) Jennifer Ruggeri	3	6	7^{7}
3	(United States) Kayla Day	6	3	6^{3}

=== Top half ===
First round
1	(Spain) A Lázaro García	6	6
LL	(Spain) C Cerviño Ruiz	1	3
(Spain) I Burillo	3	1
(Italy) TC Grant	6	6
Q	(Spain) A Rey García	6	6
WC	(Spain) C Anson Sánchez	2	3
Q	(Italy) J Ruggeri	5	7^{7}	6
6	(Spain) L Romero Gormaz	7	6^{5}	1
9	(Spain) G Maristany	6	6
A Tikhonova	2	4
WC	(Spain) A Teixidó García	2	6	6
Q	(Spain) M Martínez Vaquero	6	4	3
(Japan) M Hontama	6	4	6
Q	(Germany) M Hodzic	4	6	2
(Germany) T Brockmann	7	3	1
7	(United States) E Mandlik	5	6	6

Second round
1	(Spain) A Lázaro García	6	6
(Italy) TC Grant	4	3
Q	(Spain) A Rey García	4	4
Q	(Italy) J Ruggeri	6	6
9	(Spain) G Maristany	6	6
WC	(Spain) A Teixidó García	1	0
(Japan) M Hontama	3	1
7	(United States) E Mandlik	6	6

Quarterfinals
1	(Spain) A Lázaro García	4	3
Q	(Italy) J Ruggeri	6	6
9	(Spain) G Maristany	7	6
7	(United States) E Mandlik	5	0

Semifinals
Q	(Italy) J Ruggeri	7	6
9	(Spain) G Maristany	5	4

=== Bottom half ===
First round
5	(Chinese Taipei) J Garland	6	6
Q	(France) L Nguyen Tan	4	3
WC	(Spain) A Palazón Lacasa	1	0
(Spain) Á Fita Boluda	6	6
Q	(Belgium) J Otzipka	2	1
(Netherlands) E Vedder	6	6
(Spain) A Mintegi del Olmo	4	2
3	(United States) K Day	6	6
8	(Argentina) L Giovannini	6	6
LL	(France) D Gaillard	0	4
Q	(Italy) A Moratelli	7	6
WC	(Spain) C Martínez Círez	5	2
(United States) A Akli	4	5
Q	(Argentina) N Podoroska	6	7
(Lithuania) J Mikulskytė	0	3
2	(Belgium) S Costoulas	6	6

Second round
5	(Chinese Taipei) J Garland	5	6	1
(Spain) Á Fita Boluda	7	3	6
(Netherlands) E Vedder	3	6^{5}
3	(United States) K Day	6	7^{7}
8	(Argentina) L Giovannini	6	6
Q	(Italy) A Moratelli	2	3
Q	(Argentina) N Podoroska	3	6	7^{7}
2	(Belgium) S Costoulas	6	0	6^{5}

Quarterfinals
(Spain) Á Fita Boluda	2	2
3	(United States) K Day	6	6
8	(Argentina) L Giovannini	6	6
Q	(Argentina) N Podoroska	2	1

Semifinals
3	(United States) K Day	6	6
8	(Argentina) L Giovannini	4	4
