= 2023 Zaragoza Open =

Tennis tournament

- Date: 10–16 April 2023
- Edition: 1st
- Category: ITF Women's World Tennis Tour
- Prize money: $80,000
- Surface: Clay / Outdoor
- Location: Zaragoza, Spain

Champions

Singles
- (Bulgaria) Viktoriya Tomova

Doubles
- (France) Diane Parry / (Netherlands) Arantxa Rus
Zaragoza Open	· 2024 →

The 2023 Zaragoza Open was a professional tennis tournament played on outdoor clay courts. It was the first edition of the tournament, which was part of the 2023 ITF Women's World Tennis Tour. It took place in Zaragoza, Spain, between 10 and 16 April 2023.

== Champions ==
=== Singles ===
- (Bulgaria) Viktoriya Tomova def. (Czech Republic) Tereza Martincová, 4–6, 6–2, 6–3

=== Doubles ===
- (France) Diane Parry / (Netherlands) Arantxa Rus def. (United States) Asia Muhammad / (United Kingdom) Eden Silva, 6–1, 4–6, [10–5]

== Singles main draw entrants ==
=== Seeds ===
Country	Player	Rank	Seed
MNE	Danka Kovinić	73	1
BUL	Viktoriya Tomova	88	2
FRA	Océane Dodin	99	3
CZE	Tereza Martincová	102	4
FRA	Diane Parry	107	5
NED	Arantxa Rus	108	6
	Erika Andreeva	120	7
FRA	Jessika Ponchet	135	8

- Rankings are as of 3 April 2023.

=== Other entrants ===
The following players received wildcards into the singles main draw:

- (Spain) Irene Burillo Escorihuela
- (Spain) Andrea Lázaro García
- (Spain) Andrea Palazón
- Anastasia Pavlyuchenkova

The following player received entry into the singles main draw using a protected ranking:

- (Bulgaria) Sesil Karatantcheva

The following player received entry into the singles main draw using a junior exempt:

- (Czech Republic) Lucie Havlíčková

The following players received entry from the qualifying draw:

- (Spain) Lucía Cortez Llorca
- (Venezuela) Andrea Gámiz
- (United States) Ashley Lahey
- (Czech Republic) Jesika Malečková
- (Germany) Joëlle Steur
- (Romania) Ioana Loredana Roșca
- (France) Margaux Rouvroy
- Ksenia Zaytseva
