= 2026 Zaragoza Open – Doubles =

Doubles
- 2026 Zaragoza Open

Final
- Champions: (Spain) Yvonne Cavallé Reimers (Spain) Ángela Fita Boluda
- Runners-up: (United States) Ayana Akli (Belgium) Lara Salden
- Score: 6–4, 6–4

Events
Singles	Doubles
- Zaragoza Open

Olivia Gadecki and Aldila Sutjiadi were the defending champions, but Gadecki chose not to participate and Sutjiadi chose to compete at the French Open instead.

Yvonne Cavallé Reimers and Ángela Fita Boluda won the title, defeating Ayana Akli and Lara Salden 6–4, 6–4 in the final.

== Seeds ==
1. (Italy) Angelica Moratelli / Anastasia Tikhonova (semifinals)
2. (Spain) Yvonne Cavallé Reimers / (Spain) Ángela Fita Boluda (champions)
3. (United Kingdom) Freya Christie / (United Kingdom) Eden Silva (first round)
4. (Belgium) Polina Bakhmutkina / Ekaterina Ovcharenko (first round)

== Draw ==
Key

- Q = Qualifier
- WC = Wild card
- LL = Lucky loser
- Alt = Alternate
- ITF = ITF entry
- PR = Protected ranking
- SR = Special ranking
- SE = Special exempt
- JE = Junior exempt
- JR = Junior Accelerator Programme entrant
- CO = College Accelerator Programme entrant
- NG = Next Gen Accelerator Program entrant
- w/o = Walkover
- r = Retired
- d = Defaulted

First round
(Spain) P Ortega Redondo (Belgium) J Otzipka	6	6
WC	(Spain) B Miret Avante (Spain) A Palazón Lacasa	4	4
3	(United Kingdom) F Christie (United Kingdom) E Silva	4	6	[7]
(Germany) L Böhner (Germany) M Hodzic	6	1	[10]
(United States) A Akli (Belgium) L Salden	6	7
(Spain) I Burillo (Spain) C Cerviño Ruiz	1	5
WC	(Spain) C Anson Sánchez (Spain) R Roura Llaverias	5	3
(Spain) M Martínez Vaquero (United Kingdom) E Webley-Smith	7	6
(Ukraine) A Firman (China) M Liu	6	4	[10]
4	(Belgium) P Bakhmutkina; E Ovcharenko	1	6	[6]
WC	(Spain) L San José (Spain) M Trujillo Garnica	2	0
(Spain) C Martínez Círez (Spain) A Teixidó García	6	6

Quarterfinals
1	(Italy) A Moratelli; A Tikhonova	6	6
(Spain) P Ortega Redondo (Belgium) J Otzipka	2	0
(Germany) L Böhner (Germany) M Hodzic	6	1	[6]
(United States) A Akli (Belgium) L Salden	3	6	[10]
(Spain) M Martínez Vaquero (United Kingdom) E Webley-Smith	6	6
(Ukraine) A Firman (China) M Liu	4	4
(Spain) C Martínez Círez (Spain) A Teixidó García	1	3
2	(Spain) Y Cavallé Reimers (Spain) Á Fita Boluda	6	6

Semifinals
1	(Italy) A Moratelli; A Tikhonova	6	1	[9]
(United States) A Akli (Belgium) L Salden	4	6	[11]
(Spain) M Martínez Vaquero (United Kingdom) E Webley-Smith	7^{9}	4	[4]
2	(Spain) Y Cavallé Reimers (Spain) Á Fita Boluda	6^{7}	6	[10]

Final
(United States) A Akli (Belgium) L Salden	4	4
2	(Spain) Y Cavallé Reimers (Spain) Á Fita Boluda	6	6
