= 2025 Zaragoza Open =

Tennis tournament

- Date: 7–13 April 2025
- Edition: 3th
- Category: ITF Women's World Tennis Tour
- Prize money: $100,000
- Surface: Clay / Outdoor
- Location: Zaragoza, Spain

Champions

Singles
- Anastasia Zakharova

Doubles
- (Australia) Olivia Gadecki / (Indonesia) Aldila Sutjiadi
- Zaragoza Open

The 2025 Zaragoza Open was a professional tennis tournament played on outdoor clay courts. It was the third edition of the tournament, which is part of the 2025 ITF Women's World Tennis Tour. It took place in Zaragoza, Spain, between 7 and 13 April 2025.

== Champions ==
=== Singles ===
- Anastasia Zakharova def. (Spain) Kaitlin Quevedo, 6–3, 6–1.

=== Doubles ===
- (Australia) Olivia Gadecki / (Indonesia) Aldila Sutjiadi def. (Spain) Aliona Bolsova / (Spain) Ángela Fita Boluda, 6–4, 6–3.

== Singles main draw entrants ==
=== Seeds ===
Country	Player	Rank	Seed
EGY	Mayar Sherif	63	1
AUS	Olivia Gadecki	100	2
UKR	Yuliia Starodubtseva	103	3
FRA	Chloé Paquet	120	4
USA	Varvara Lepchenko	122	5
	Anastasia Zakharova	128	6
AND	Victoria Jiménez Kasintseva	130	7
FRA	Elsa Jacquemot	138	8

- Rankings are as of 31 March 2025.

=== Other entrants ===
The following players received wildcards into the singles main draw:

- (Spain) Celia Anson Sánchez
- (Spain) Aliona Bolsova
- (Spain) Andrea Palazón Lacasa
- (Spain) Kaitlin Quevedo

The following players received entry from the qualifying draw:

- Amina Anshba
- (Spain) Celia Cerviño Ruiz
- Alina Charaeva
- (Ukraine) Veronika Podrez
- (Romania) Andreea Prisăcariu
- (Czech Republic) Anna Sisková
- (Germany) Joëlle Steur
- (Germany) Caroline Werner

The following player received entry as lucky loser:

- (Italy) Dalila Spiteri
