= 2024 Zaragoza Open =

Tennis tournament

- Date: 8–14 April 2024
- Edition: 2nd
- Category: ITF Women's World Tennis Tour
- Prize money: $100,000
- Surface: Clay / Outdoor
- Location: Zaragoza, Spain

Champions

Singles
- (Japan) Moyuka Uchijima

Doubles
- (Czech Republic) Miriam Kolodziejová / (Czech Republic) Anna Sisková
- Zaragoza Open

The 2024 Zaragoza Open was a professional tennis tournament played on outdoor clay courts. It was the second edition of the tournament, which was part of the 2024 ITF Women's World Tennis Tour. It took place in Zaragoza, Spain, between 8 and 14 April 2024.

== Champions ==
=== Singles ===
- (Japan) Moyuka Uchijima def. (Spain) Jéssica Bouzas Maneiro, 6–1, 6–2

=== Doubles ===
- (Czech Republic) Miriam Kolodziejová / (Czech Republic) Anna Sisková def. (Italy) Angelica Moratelli / (Italy) Camilla Rosatello, 6–2, 6–3

== Singles main draw entrants ==
=== Seeds ===
Country	Player	Rank	Seed
NED	Arantxa Rus	54	1
ITA	Martina Trevisan	81	2
CHN	Bai Zhuoxuan	86	3
ESP	Rebeka Masarova	91	4
~~FRA~~	~~Varvara Gracheva~~	~~100~~	~~5~~
ESP	Jéssica Bouzas Maneiro	104	6
GER	Jule Niemeier	113	7
USA	Elizabeth Mandlik	125	8

- Rankings are as of 1 April 2024.

=== Other entrants ===
The following players received wildcards into the singles main draw:

- (Spain) Irene Burillo Escorihuela
- (Spain) Carlota Martínez Círez
- (Spain) Kaitlin Quevedo
- (Spain) Leyre Romero Gormaz

The following players received entry from the qualifying draw:

- (United Kingdom) Naiktha Bains
- (Greece) Eleni Christofi
- (France) Amandine Hesse
- (Germany) Mina Hodzic
- (Romania) Gabriela Lee
- Marina Melnikova
- Veronika Miroshnichenko
- (Italy) Camilla Rosatello

The following player received entry as a lucky loser:

- (Spain) Lucía Cortez Llorca
