= 2025 Zaragoza Open – Singles =

Singles
- 2025 Zaragoza Open

Final
- Champion: Anastasia Zakharova
- Runner-up: (Spain) Kaitlin Quevedo
- Score: 6–3, 6–1

Events
Singles	Doubles
- Zaragoza Open

Moyuka Uchijima was the defending champion but chose not to participate.

Anastasia Zakharova won the title, defeating Kaitlin Quevedo in the final, 6–3, 6–1.

== Seeds ==
1. (Egypt) Mayar Sherif (second round)
2. (Australia) Olivia Gadecki (semifinals)
3. (Ukraine) Yuliia Starodubtseva (first round)
4. (France) Chloé Paquet (second round)
5. (United States) Varvara Lepchenko (quarterfinals)
6. Anastasia Zakharova (champion)
7. (Andorra) Victoria Jiménez Kasintseva (second round)
8. (France) Elsa Jacquemot (first round)

== Draw ==
Key

- Q = Qualifier
- WC = Wild card
- LL = Lucky loser
- Alt = Alternate
- ITF = ITF entry
- PR = Protected ranking
- SR = Special ranking
- SE = Special exempt
- JE = Junior exempt
- JR = Junior Accelerator Programme entrant
- CO = College Accelerator Programme entrant
- NG = Next Gen Accelerator Program entrant
- w/o = Walkover
- r = Retired
- d = Defaulted

=== Finals ===
Semifinals
6	Anastasia Zakharova	6	3	6
(Czech Republic) Barbora Palicová	0	6	3
WC	(Spain) Kaitlin Quevedo	6	6
2	(Australia) Olivia Gadecki	3	3

Final
6	Anastasia Zakharova	6	6
WC	(Spain) Kaitlin Quevedo	3	1

=== Top half ===
First round
1	(Egypt) M Sherif	6	2
Q	(Germany) J Steur	1	0^{r}
Q	A Charaeva	6	7
(Spain) C Martínez Círez	2	5
Q	(Romania) A Prisăcariu	2	4
(Spain) I Burillo	6	6
Q	A Anshba	3	1
6	A Zakharova	6	6
4	(France) C Paquet	6	7
(Spain) A Lázaro García	2	5
WC	(Spain) A Palazón Lacasa	0	3
(Czech Republic) B Palicová	6	6
(Spain) L Romero Gormaz	7	6
(Italy) N Fossa Huergo	5	4
(Germany) T Korpatsch	0	7^{7}	6
8	(France) E Jacquemot	6	6^{4}	0

Second round
1	(Egypt) M Sherif	6	6^{4}	6^{4}
Q	A Charaeva	4	7^{7}	7^{7}
(Spain) I Burillo	0	3
6	A Zakharova	6	6
4	(France) C Paquet	5	6	6^{6}
(Czech Republic) B Palicová	7	3	7^{8}
(Spain) L Romero Gormaz	6	6^{6}	4
(Germany) T Korpatsch	1	7^{8}	6

Quarterfinals
Q	A Charaeva	0	1
6	A Zakharova	6	6
(Czech Republic) B Palicová	6	6
(Germany) T Korpatsch	3	0

Semifinals
6	A Zakharova	6	3	6
(Czech Republic) B Palicová	0	6	3

=== Bottom half ===
First round
5	(United States) V Lepchenko	6	6
LL	(Italy) D Spiteri	4	4
(Spain) M Bassols Ribera	7^{7}	4	6
Q	(Spain) C Cerviño Ruiz	6^{4}	6	3
(Spain) Á Fita Boluda	1	6^{2}
WC	(Spain) K Quevedo	6	7^{7}
Q	(Germany) C Werner	6	6
3	(Ukraine) Y Starodubtseva	2	4
7	(Andorra) V Jiménez Kasintseva	6	7^{7}
WC	(Spain) C Anson Sánchez	2	6^{2}
(France) A Hesse	6	5	5
Q	(Czech Republic) A Sisková	4	7	7
(Serbia) N Stojanović	6	4	6
WC	(Spain) A Bolsova	4	6	1
Q	(Ukraine) V Podrez	7	1	1
2	(Australia) O Gadecki	5	6	6

Second round
5	(United States) V Lepchenko	6	2	6
(Spain) M Bassols Ribera	4	6	3
WC	(Spain) K Quevedo	4	6	6
Q	(Germany) C Werner	6	3	1
7	(Andorra) V Jiménez Kasintseva	0	5
Q	(Czech Republic) A Sisková	6	7
(Serbia) N Stojanović	2	6	5
2	(Australia) O Gadecki	6	4	7

Quarterfinals
5	(United States) V Lepchenko	3	6	2
WC	(Spain) K Quevedo	6	3	6
Q	(Czech Republic) A Sisková	7	4	4
2	(Australia) O Gadecki	5	6	6

Semifinals
WC	(Spain) K Quevedo	6	6
2	(Australia) O Gadecki	3	3
