= 2025 ITF Women's World Tennis Tour =

Entry and mid-level professional circuit

Details
- Duration: 30 December 2024 – 28 December 2025
- Edition: 32nd
- Categories: W100 tournaments W75 tournaments W50 tournaments W35 tournaments W15 tournaments

Achievements (singles)
- Most titles: Daria Khomutsianskaya (7)
- Most finals: (Indonesia) Janice Tjen (9)

The 2025 International Tennis Federation (ITF) Women's World Tennis Tour is the entry-level and mid-level tour for women's professional tennis. It is organized by the International Tennis Federation and is a tier below the WTA Challenger series of the Women's Tennis Association (WTA) Tour. The Tour provides a professional pathway between the ITF Junior World Tennis Tour and the WTA Tour. The results of ITF tournaments are incorporated into the WTA ranking, which enables professionals to progress through to the elite levels of women's professional tennis. The ITF Women's World Tennis Tour offers approximately 500 tournaments across 65 countries and incorporates five prize money levels of tournaments: $15,000, $30,000, $40,000, $60,000 and $100,000.

Tournaments at $15,000 level include reserved main draw places for Top-100 ranked ITF Juniors, providing a smooth pathway for the best new talent to break through into elite professional tennis. The ITF Women's World Tennis Tour is also designed to target prize money effectively to help reduce costs for players and ultimately enable more players to make a living. From 2025, the prize money has increased in one category. At W35 tournaments from $25,000 to $30,000.

From 1 March 2022, following the Russian invasion of Ukraine the ITF announced that players from Belarus and Russia could still play on the tour but would not be allowed to play under the flag of Belarus or Russia.

== Cancelled/postponed tournaments ==
The following tournaments were formally announced by the ITF before being subsequently cancelled or postponed.

Week of	Tournament	Status
February 3	Naples, United States; W35 – Clay	Cancelled
February 24	Morelia, Mexico; W50 – Hard	Cancelled
August 18	Přerov, Czech Republic; W75 – Clay	Cancelled

== Participating host nations ==
- Argentina (ARG)
- Armenia (ARM)
- Australia (AUS)
- Austria (AUT)
- Belgium (BEL)
- Bosnia and Herzegovina (BIH)
- Brazil (BRA)
- Bulgaria (BUL)
- Burundi (BDI)
- Canada (CAN)
- Chile (CHI)
- China (CHN)
- Chinese Taipei (TPE)
- Colombia (COL)
- Croatia (CRO)
- Cyprus (CYP)
- Czech Republic (CZE)
- Dominican Republic (DOM)
- Egypt (EGY)
- El Salvador (ESA)
- France (FRA)
- Finland (FIN)
- Georgia (GEO)
- Germany (GER)
- Great Britain (GBR)
- Greece (GRE)
- Hong Kong (HKG)
- Hungary (HUN)
- India (IND)
- Ireland (IRE)
- Italy (ITA)
- Japan (JPN)
- Kazakhstan (KAZ)
- Kenya (KEN)
- Luxembourg (LUX)
- Malta (MLT)
- Mexico (MEX)
- Morocco (MAR)
- Netherlands (NED)
- New Zealand (NZL)
- Norway (NOR)
- Peru (PER)
- Poland (POL)
- Portugal (POR)
- Romania (ROU)
- Serbia (SRB)
- Singapore (SGP)
- Slovakia (SVK)
- Slovenia (SLO)
- South Africa (RSA)
- South Korea (KOR)
- Spain (SPA)
- Sweden (SWE)
- Switzerland (SUI)
- Thailand (THA)
- Tunisia (TUN)
- Turkey (TUR)
- United Arab Emirates (UAE)
- United States (USA)
- Uzbekistan (UZB)
- Vietnam (VIE)

== WTA ranking points distribution ==
Category	W	F	SF	QF	R16	R32	R64	Q	FQR	Q2	Q1
W100 (48S, 32Q)	100	65	39	21	12	7	1	5	3	–	–
W100 (32S, 32/24Q)	100	65	39	21	12	1	–	5	3	–	–
W100 (16D)	100	65	39	21	1	–	–	–	–	–	–
W75 (48S, 32Q)	75	49	29	16	9	5	1	3	2	–	–
W75 (32S, 32/24Q)	75	49	29	16	9	1	–	3	2	–	–
W75 (16D)	75	49	29	16	1	–	–	–	–	–	–
W50 (48S, 32Q)	50	33	20	11	6	3	1	2	1	–	–
W50 (32S, 32/24Q)	50	33	20	11	6	1	–	2	1	–	–
W50 (16D)	50	33	20	11	1	–	–	–	–	–	–
W35 (48S, 32Q)	35	23	14	8	4	2	1	1	–	–	–
W35 (32S, 32/24Q)	35	23	14	8	4	–	–	1	–	–	–
W35 (32S, 48/64Q)	35	23	14	8	4	–	–	1	–	–	–
W35 (16D)	35	23	14	8	1	–	–	–	–	–	–
W15 (32S, 32/24Q)	15	10	6	3	1	–	–	–	–	–	–
W15 (32S, 48/64Q)	15	10	6	3	1	–	–	–	–	–	–
W15 (16D)	15	10	6	1	–	–	–	–	–	–	–

== Statistics ==
=== Key ===
Category
W100 tournaments
W75 tournaments
W50 tournaments
W35 tournaments
W15 tournaments

These tables present the number of singles (S) and doubles (D) titles won by each player and each nation during the season. The players/nations are sorted by:

1. Total number of titles (a doubles title won by two players representing the same nation counts as only one win for the nation)
2. A singles > doubles hierarchy
3. Alphabetical order (by family names for players).

To avoid confusion and double counting, these tables should be updated only after all events of the week are completed.

=== Titles won by player ===
Updated as of 5 January 2026

Total	Player	W100		W75		W50		W35		W15		Total	
Total	Player	S	D	S	D	S	D	S	D	S	D	S	D
18	Sapfo Sakellaridi (GRE)				3		3		2	3	7	3	15
17	Daria Khomutsianskaya							1	1	6	9	7	10
11	Katharina Hobgarski (GER)							4	3	1	3	5	6
10	Joy de Zeeuw (NED)				1		1		3		5	0	10
10	Janice Tjen (INA)					1	1	4	3	1		6	4
10	Sarah van Emst (NED)						1		3	1	5	1	9
10	Joëlle Steur (GER)						1		1	4	4	4	6
10	Kim Na-ri (KOR)								1		9	0	10
9	Ayano Shimizu (JPN)		2				3		3	1		1	8
9	Anna Sisková (CZE)		1		4		1			3		3	6
9	Hiromi Abe (JPN)				1			1	4	1	2	2	7
9	Alicia Dudeney (GBR)						1	1	3	2	2	3	6
8	Matilde Jorge (POR)		2		3	1	2					1	7
8	Momoko Kobori (JPN)		2				3	1	2			1	7
8	Eryn Cayetano (USA)		1		1					3	3	3	5
8	Lisa Zaar (SWE)				1		1		6			0	8
8	Angella Okutoyi (KEN)						2	1	4		1	1	7
8	Martina Capurro Taborda (ARG)							1	2	3	2	4	4
8	Katarína Kužmová (SVK)								4	3	1	3	5
8	Ye Qiuyu (CHN)								2		6	0	8
7	Francisca Jorge (POR)		1		3	1	2					1	6
7	Park So-hyun (KOR)		1			1	2	2	1			3	4
7	Victoria Mboko (CAN)			2				3	2			5	2
7	Vendula Valdmannová (CZE)				2			1	3	1		2	5
7	Ikumi Yamazaki (JPN)				1	1	1		3	1		2	5
7	Martyna Kubka (POL)				1	1	1		2	2		3	4
7	Natalija Senić (SRB)				1			2	1	2	1	4	3
7	Ku Yeon-woo (KOR)							4	2		1	4	3
7	Alexandra Shubladze							2	1	1	3	3	4
7	Patcharin Cheapchandej (THA)							1	1	3	2	4	3
7	Li Zongyu (CHN)								5	1	1	1	6
7	Ayumi Miyamoto (JPN)								4		3	0	7
7	Maria Golovina								1	2	4	2	5
6	Anastasia Tikhonova		1	1	1	1	1		1			2	4
6	Weronika Falkowska (POL)		1		1		1		3			0	6
6	Ella McDonald (GBR)		1				2		2	1		1	5
6	Priska Madelyn Nugroho (INA)				1		1		2	2		2	4
6	Peangtarn Plipuech (THA)				1		1		2		2	0	6
6	Carol Young Suh Lee (USA)					1		2		2	1	5	1
6	Varvara Panshina						1			1	4	1	5
6	Luisina Giovannini (ARG)							4	1	1		5	1
6	Hibah Shaikh (USA)							2	1	2	1	4	2
6	Back Da-yeon (KOR)							1	3	1	1	2	4
6	Laura Hietaranta (FIN)							1	2	3		4	2
6	Tessa Johanna Brockmann (GER)							1	1	3	1	4	2
6	Carolyn Ansari (USA)							1		2	3	3	3
6	Anita Sahdiieva (UKR)								2		4	0	6
6	Britt du Pree (NED)								1	1	4	1	5
6	Elena Korokozidi (GRE)								1	1	4	1	5
6	Adrienn Nagy (HUN)								1	1	4	1	5
6	Radka Zelníčková (SVK)								1	1	4	1	5
6	Aran Teixidó García (ESP)									4	2	4	2
6	Eliška Ticháčková (CZE)									3	3	3	3
6	Madelief Hageman (NED)										6	0	6
6	Luciana Moyano (ARG)										6	0	6
5	Petra Marčinko (CRO)	3		1	1							4	1
5	Ayana Akli (USA)		2		1			1	1			1	4
5	Dalayna Hewitt (USA)		2				1			1	1	1	4
5	Nika Radišić (SLO)		1		3				1			0	5
5	Saki Imamura (JPN)		1				2		1	1		1	4
5	Sinja Kraus (AUT)			3	1	1						4	1
5	Ivana Šebestová (CZE)				3					1	1	1	4
5	Zheng Wushuang (CHN)				2		1		2			0	5
5	Aneta Kučmová (CZE)				2				3			0	5
5	Lia Karatantcheva (BUL)				1	1	2		1			1	4
5	Jenny Dürst (SUI)				1			1	1	2		3	2
5	Anja Stanković (SRB)				1				1	1	2	1	4
5	Eva Guerrero Álvarez (ESP)					2		1		2		5	0
5	Rasheeda McAdoo (USA)						3		2			0	5
5	Anna Rogers (USA)						2	1	2			1	4
5	Victoria Allen (GBR)						1	1			3	1	4
5	Zuzanna Pawlikowska (POL)						1		3		1	0	5
5	Savannah Broadus (USA)						1		2		2	0	5
5	Julia Adams (USA)						1			2	2	2	3
5	Guo Meiqi (CHN)						1			2	2	2	3
5	Francesca Pace (ITA)							3	2			3	2
5	Caijsa Hennemann (SWE)							2	1	2		4	1
5	Ekaterina Reyngold							1	2	2		3	2
5	Stéphanie Visscher (NED)							1	2	1	1	2	3
5	Jana Kovačková (CZE)							1		1	3	2	3
5	Anastasia Zolotareva							1		1	3	2	3
5	Monique Barry (NZL)								4		1	0	5
5	Elena Ruxandra Bertea (ROU)								2	3		3	2
5	Ștefania Bojică (ROU)								1	2	2	2	3
5	Eva Marie Voracek (GER)								1	1	3	1	4
5	Marianne Argyrokastriti (GRE)								1		4	0	5
5	Kisa Yoshioka (JPN)								1		4	0	5
5	Alina Granwehr (SUI)									4	1	4	1
5	Sandra Samir (EGY)									3	2	3	2
5	Wang Jiaqi (CHN)									1	4	1	4
5	Im Hee-rae (KOR)										5	0	5
5	Anna Kubareva										5	0	5
4	Darja Viďmanová (CZE)	1		1	1			1				3	1
4	Maria Kozyreva		2		1		1					0	4
4	Iryna Shymanovich		2			1	1					1	3
4	Dalila Jakupović (SLO)		1		2				1			0	4
4	Magali Kempen (BEL)		1		1		2					0	4
4	Justina Mikulskytė (LTU)		1			1	2					1	3
4	Talia Gibson (AUS)			2	1	1						3	1
4	Oleksandra Oliynykova (UKR)			1		1		2				4	0
4	Manon Léonard (FRA)			1		1				2		4	0
4	Eva Bennemann (GER)			1						2	1	3	1
4	Liang En-shuo (TPE)				2		2					0	4
4	Feng Shuo (CHN)				2		1		1			0	4
4	Clervie Ngounoue (USA)				1	2			1			2	2
4	Lucie Havlíčková (CZE)				1	1			1	1		2	2
4	Ankita Raina (IND)				1		2		1			0	4
4	Ariana Arseneault (CAN)				1		1		2			0	4
4	Naiktha Bains (GBR)				1		1		2			0	4
4	Raphaëlle Lacasse (CAN)				1		1		1		1	0	4
4	Denisa Hindová (CZE)				1		1				2	0	4
4	Alicia Herrero Liñana (ESP)				1			1	2			1	3
4	Alena Kovačková (CZE)				1						3	0	4
4	Sada Nahimana (BDI)					2			2			2	2
4	Katie Swan (GBR)					1		2		1		4	0
4	Elizara Yaneva (BUL)					1			1	2		3	1
4	Ksenia Zaytseva						3		1			0	4
4	Xiao Zhenghua (CHN)						2				2	0	4
4	Miriana Tona (ITA)						1	1	2			1	3
4	Hiroko Kuwata (JPN)						1		3			0	4
4	Ashley Lahey (USA)						1		2	1		1	3
4	Haley Giavara (USA)						1		1		2	0	4
4	Daria Zelinskaya						1				3	0	4
4	Joanna Garland (TPE)							4				4	0
4	Lizette Cabrera (AUS)							3	1			3	1
4	Lucciana Pérez Alarcón (PER)							2	1	1		3	1
4	Ema Burgić (BIH)							1	3			1	3
4	Lee Eun-hye (KOR)							1	2		1	1	3
4	Lisa Pigato (ITA)							1	1	1	1	2	2
4	Jeline Vandromme (BEL)							1		3		4	0
4	Anouck Vrancken Peeters (NED)							1		3		4	0
4	Hikaru Sato (JPN)								4			0	4
4	Marian Gómez Pezuela Cano (MEX)								3		1	0	4
4	Li Yu-yun (TPE)								3		1	0	4
4	Haruna Arakawa (JPN)								2	1	1	1	3
4	Daria Egorova								1	2	1	2	2
4	Anna Hertel (POL)								1	2	1	2	2
4	Elena Milovanović (SRB)								1	1	2	1	3
4	Patricija Paukštytė (LTU)								1	1	2	1	3
4	Zhang Ying (CHN)								1	1	2	1	3
4	Huang Yujia (CHN)								1		3	0	4
4	Daria Kuczer (POL)								1		3	0	4
4	Fernanda Labraña (CHI)								1		3	0	4
4	Luiza Fullana (BRA)									3	1	3	1
4	Yang Yidi (CHN)									3	1	3	1
4	Lamis Alhussein Abdel Aziz (EGY)									2	2	2	2
4	Ekaterina Khayrutdinova									2	2	2	2
4	Kristina Kroitor									2	2	2	2
4	Maria Sholokhova									2	2	2	2
4	Mi Lan (CHN)									1	3	1	3
4	Valeriya Yushchenko									1	3	1	3
4	Laura Böhner (GER)										4	0	4
4	Salma Drugdová (SVK)										4	0	4
4	Lily Fairclough (AUS)										4	0	4
4	María Herazo González (COL)										4	0	4
4	Sandugash Kenzhibayeva (KAZ)										4	0	4
4	Vanessa Popa Teiuşanu (ROU)										4	0	4
4	Camila Romero (ECU)										4	0	4
4	Linda Ševčíková (CZE)										4	0	4
3	Mimi Xu (GBR)	1	1						1			1	2
3	Zhang Shuai (CHN)	1				2						3	0
3	Himeno Sakatsume (JPN)	1				1	1					2	1
3	Zhibek Kulambayeva (KAZ)		2							1		1	2
3	Guo Hanyu (CHN)		1			2						2	1
3	Aneta Laboutková (CZE)		1						2			0	3
3	Abigail Rencheli (USA)		1								2	0	3
3	Julia Grabher (AUT)			2				1				3	0
3	Lilli Tagger (AUT)			2				1				3	0
3	Alina Korneeva			1		2						3	0
3	Laura Samson (CZE)			1		2						3	0
3	Nuria Brancaccio (ITA)			1		1		1				3	0
3	Nikola Bartůňková (CZE)			1				2				3	0
3	Valentina Ryser (SUI)			1				1	1			2	1
3	Ana Sofía Sánchez (MEX)			1				1	1			2	1
3	Veronika Podrez (UKR)			1						2		3	0
3	Elena Pridankina				3							0	3
3	Viktória Hrunčáková (SVK)				2				1			0	3
3	Julie Belgraver (FRA)				1		1	1				1	2
3	Rutuja Bhosale (IND)				1		1		1			0	3
3	Jasmijn Gimbrère (NED)				1				2			0	3
3	Elena Micic (AUS)				1				2			0	3
3	Alana Smith (USA)				1				2			0	3
3	Marcelina Podlińska (POL)				1					2		2	1
3	Polina Iatcenko					1	1	1				2	1
3	Guiomar Maristany (ESP)					1	1	1				2	1
3	Alisa Oktiabreva					1		2				3	0
3	Sara Saito (JPN)					1		1	1			2	1
3	Amarissa Kiara Tóth (HUN)					1		1	1			2	1
3	Jazmín Ortenzi (ARG)					1		1			1	2	1
3	Alice Tubello (FRA)					1			1	1		2	1
3	Kayla Cross (CAN)						2	1				1	2
3	Holly Hutchinson (GBR)						2		1			0	3
3	Ángela Fita Boluda (ESP)						1	2				2	1
3	Martha Matoula (GRE)						1		2			0	3
3	Amelia Rajecki (GBR)						1		2			0	3
3	Chelsea Fontenel (SUI)						1		1		1	0	3
3	Alice Robbe (FRA)						1		1		1	0	3
3	Michaela Bayerlová (CZE)						1				2	0	3
3	Noelia Bouzó Zanotti (ESP)						1				2	0	3
3	Ane Mintegi del Olmo (ESP)							3				3	0
3	Taylah Preston (AUS)							3				3	0
3	Vivian Wolff (USA)							3				3	0
3	Fiona Crawley (USA)							2	1			2	1
3	Katarina Jokić (SRB)							2	1			2	1
3	Despina Papamichail (GRE)							2	1			2	1
3	Tina Nadine Smith (AUS)							2	1			2	1
3	Jennifer Ruggeri (ITA)							2		1		3	0
3	Giorgia Pedone (ITA)							1	2			1	2
3	Julie Štruplová (CZE)							1	1	1		2	1
3	Yasmine Mansouri (FRA)							1	1		1	1	2
3	Vittoria Paganetti (ITA)							1	1		1	1	2
3	Luca Udvardy (HUN)							1		2		3	0
3	Punnin Kovapitukted (THA)							1			2	1	2
3	Anastasia Abbagnato (ITA)								3			0	3
3	Maribella Zamarripa (USA)								3			0	3
3	Deborah Chiesa (ITA)								2	1		1	2
3	Ana Candiotto (BRA)								2		1	0	3
3	Gabriella Da Silva-Fick (AUS)								2		1	0	3
3	Tiphanie Lemaître (FRA)								2		1	0	3
3	Eri Shimizu (JPN)								2		1	0	3
3	Noelia Zeballos (BOL)								2		1	0	3
3	Ilinca Amariei (ROU)								1	2		2	1
3	Rositsa Dencheva (BUL)								1	2		2	1
3	Rose Marie Nijkamp (NED)								1	2		2	1
3	Arina Bulatova								1	1	1	1	2
3	Alba Rey García (ESP)								1	1	1	1	2
3	Marie Vogt (GER)								1	1	1	1	2
3	Romina Ccuno (PER)								1		2	0	3
3	Diae El Jardi (MAR)								1		2	0	3
3	Natsumi Kawaguchi (JPN)								1		2	0	3
3	Júlia Konishi Camargo Silva (BRA)								1		2	0	3
3	Lin Fang-an (TPE)								1		2	0	3
3	Miyu Nakashima (JPN)								1		2	0	3
3	Victoria Bosio (ARG)									3		3	0
3	Isabella Shinikova (BUL)									3		3	0
3	Adelina Lachinova (LAT)									2	1	2	1
3	Ekaterina Maklakova									2	1	2	1
3	Kristiana Sidorova									2	1	2	1
3	Alana Subasic (AUS)									2	1	2	1
3	Mariella Thamm (GER)									2	1	2	1
3	Silvia Ambrosio (ITA)									1	2	1	2
3	Kamilla Bartone (LAT)									1	2	1	2
3	Sofya Lansere									1	2	1	2
3	Aruzhan Sagandykova (KAZ)									1	2	1	2
3	Johanne Svendsen (DEN)									1	2	1	2
3	Amélie Van Impe (NED)									1	2	1	2
3	Sonja Zhenikhova (GER)									1	2	1	2
3	Esther Adeshina (GBR)										3	0	3
3	Alexandra Irina Anghel (ROU)										3	0	3
3	Rikke de Koning (NED)										3	0	3
3	Carmen Andreea Herea (ROU)										3	0	3
3	Dasha Ivanova (USA)										3	0	3
3	Kim Da-bin (KOR)										3	0	3
3	Sabastiani Leon (MEX)										3	0	3
3	Maria Oliver Sanchez (ESP)										3	0	3
3	Kseniya Yersh										3	0	3
3	Daria Yesypchuk (UKR)										3	0	3
2	Mayar Sherif (EGY)	2										2	0
2	Darja Semeņistaja (LAT)	1	1									1	1
2	Maria Timofeeva	1		1								2	0
2	Wakana Sonobe (JPN)	1					1					1	1
2	Elizabeth Mandlik (USA)	1						1				2	0
2	Kaitlin Quevedo (ESP)	1						1				2	0
2	Carmen Corley (USA)		1		1							0	2
2	Olivia Gadecki (AUS)		1			1						1	1
2	Valeriya Strakhova (UKR)		1			1						1	1
2	Jessie Aney (USA)		1				1					0	2
2	Jessica Failla (USA)		1				1					0	2
2	Naïma Karamoko (SUI)		1				1					0	2
2	Irene Burillo Escorihuela (ESP)		1					1				1	1
2	Ivana Corley (USA)		1						1			0	2
2	Nicole Fossa Huergo (ITA)		1						1			0	2
2	Priscilla Hon (AUS)			2								2	0
2	Francesca Jones (GBR)			2								2	0
2	Antonia Ružić (CRO)			2								2	0
2	Solana Sierra (ARG)			2								2	0
2	Tereza Valentová (CZE)			2								2	0
2	Gabriela Knutson (CZE)			1	1							1	1
2	Camilla Rosatello (ITA)			1	1							1	1
2	Tara Würth (CRO)			1	1							1	1
2	Linda Klimovičová (POL)			1		1						2	0
2	Tamara Korpatsch (GER)			1		1						2	0
2	Tatiana Prozorova			1		1						2	0
2	Andrea Lázaro García (ESP)			1			1					1	1
2	Sofia Costoulas (BEL)			1				1				2	0
2	Harriet Dart (GBR)			1				1				2	0
2	Kayla Day (USA)			1				1				2	0
2	Emerson Jones (AUS)			1				1				2	0
2	Ayla Aksu (TUR)				2							0	2
2	Estelle Cascino (FRA)				2							0	2
2	Cho I-hsuan (TPE)				2							0	2
2	Cho Yi-tsen (TPE)				2							0	2
2	Jesika Malečková (CZE)				2							0	2
2	Miriam Škoch (CZE)				2							0	2
2	Ekaterine Gorgodze (GEO)				1	1						1	1
2	Eudice Chong (HKG)				1		1					0	2
2	Petra Hule (AUS)				1		1					0	2
2	Maddison Inglis (AUS)				1		1					0	2
2	Céline Naef (SUI)				1		1					0	2
2	Kristina Novak (SLO)				1		1					0	2
2	Cody Wong Hong-yi (HKG)				1		1					0	2
2	Eva Vedder (NED)				1			1				1	1
2	Alevtina Ibragimova				1				1			0	2
2	Abigail Rencheli (USA)				1				1			0	2
2	Alexandra Vagramov (CAN)				1				1			0	2
2	Emily Appleton (GBR)				1					1		1	1
2	Gina Feistel (POL)				1					1		1	1
2	Oana Gavrilă (ROU)				1						1	0	2
2	Patricia Maria Țig (ROU)				1						1	0	2
2	Mary Stoiana (USA)					2						2	0
2	Miriam Bulgaru (ROU)					1		1				2	0
2	Zarina Diyas (KAZ)					1		1				2	0
2	Lina Gjorcheska (MKD)					1		1				2	0
2	Whitney Osuigwe (USA)					1		1				2	0
2	Harmony Tan (FRA)					1		1				2	0
2	Aliona Falei						1	1				1	1
2	Lucía Cortez Llorca (ESP)						1		1			0	2
2	Dang Yiming (CHN)						1		1			0	2
2	Gina Marie Dittmann (GER)						1		1			0	2
2	Jimar Gerald González (CHI)						1		1			0	2
2	Catherine Harrison (USA)						1		1			0	2
2	Ylena In-Albon (SUI)						1		1			0	2
2	Kanako Morisaki (JPN)						1		1			0	2
2	Akiko Omae (JPN)						1		1			0	2
2	Mell Elizabeth Reasco González (ECU)						1		1			0	2
2	Mariia Tkacheva						1		1			0	2
2	You Xiaodi (CHN)						1		1			0	2
2	Weronika Ewald (POL)						1			1		1	1
2	Kira Pavlova						1			1		1	1
2	Lucie Nguyen Tan (FRA)						1				1	0	2
2	Yuan Chengyiyi (CHN)						1				1	0	2
2	Monika Ekstrand (USA)							2				2	0
2	Anastasia Gasanova							2				2	0
2	Katherine Sebov (CAN)							2				2	0
2	Vaidehi Chaudhari (IND)							1	1			1	1
2	Lucija Ćirić Bagarić (CRO)							1	1			1	1
2	Samira De Stefano (ITA)							1	1			1	1
2	Dalila Spiteri (ITA)							1	1			1	1
2	Mika Stojsavljevic (GBR)							1	1			1	1
2	Francesca Curmi (MLT)							1		1		2	0
2	Ariana Geerlings (ESP)							1		1		2	0
2	Jeong Bo-young (KOR)							1		1		2	0
2	Tahlia Kokkinis (AUS)							1		1		2	0
2	Sofia Shapatava (GEO)							1		1		2	0
2	Merna Refaat (EGY)							1			1	1	1
2	Tian Fangran (CHN)							1			1	1	1
2	Noemi Basiletti (ITA)								2			0	2
2	Paris Corley (USA)								2			0	2
2	Josy Daems (GER)								2			0	2
2	Jaeda Daniel (USA)								2			0	2
2	Valentini Grammatikopoulou (GRE)								2			0	2
2	Allura Zamarripa (USA)								2			0	2
2	Reina Goto (JPN)								1	1		1	1
2	Hayu Kinoshita (JPN)								1	1		1	1
2	Lee Ya-hsuan (TPE)								1	1		1	1
2	Nauhany Vitória Leme da Silva (BRA)								1	1		1	1
2	Alessandra Mazzola (ITA)								1	1		1	1
2	Stefani Webb (AUS)								1	1		1	1
2	Samantha Alicea (USA)								1		1	0	2
2	Bianca Bărbulescu (ROU)								1		1	0	2
2	Astrid Brune Olsen (NOR)								1		1	0	2
2	Mina Hodzic (GER)								1		1	0	2
2	Yuliana Lizarazo (COL)								1		1	0	2
2	María Martínez Vaquero (ESP)								1		1	0	2
2	Tenika McGiffin (AUS)								1		1	0	2
2	Yuki Naito (JPN)								1		1	0	2
2	Malkia Ngounoue (USA)								1		1	0	2
2	Ekaterina Ovcharenko								1		1	0	2
2	María Paulina Pérez García (COL)								1		1	0	2
2	Arlinda Rushiti (KOS)								1		1	0	2
2	Briana Szabó (ROU)								1		1	0	2
2	Elza Tomase (LAT)								1		1	0	2
2	Yang Ya-yi (TPE)								1		1	0	2
2	Ekaterina Yashina								1		1	0	2
2	Sophia Biolay (FRA)									2		2	0
2	Anchisa Chanta (THA)									2		2	0
2	Alice Gillan (GBR)									2		2	0
2	Yelyzaveta Kotliar (UKR)									2		2	0
2	Edda Mamedova									2		2	0
2	Anamaria Oana (ROU)									2		2	0
2	Ruth Roura Llaverias (ESP)									2		2	0
2	Sun Xinran (CHN)									2		2	0
2	Katerina Tsygourova (SUI)									2		2	0
2	Antonia Vergara Rivera (CHI)									2		2	0
2	Draginja Vuković (SRB)									2		2	0
2	Natsuki Yoshimoto (JPN)									2		2	0
2	Linea Bajraliu (SWE)									1	1	1	1
2	Ophélie Boullay (FRA)									1	1	1	1
2	Didi Bredberg Canizares (ESP)									1	1	1	1
2	Sara Dols (ESP)									1	1	1	1
2	Ksenia Efremova (FRA)									1	1	1	1
2	Anastasiia Gureva									1	1	1	1
2	Andrė Lukošiūtė (LTU)									1	1	1	1
2	Christasha McNeil (USA)									1	1	1	1
2	Marie Mettraux (SUI)									1	1	1	1
2	Luisa Meyer auf der Heide (GER)									1	1	1	1
2	Viktória Morvayová (SVK)									1	1	1	1
2	María Fernanda Navarro Oliva (MEX)									1	1	1	1
1	Maria Sara Popa (ROU)									1	1	1	1
2	Emily Seibold (GER)									1	1	1	1
2	Lavinia Tănăsie (ROU)									1	1	1	1
2	Lily Taylor (AUS)									1	1	1	1
2	Beatrise Zeltiņa (LAT)									1	1	1	1
2	Zhu Chenting (CHN)									1	1	1	1
2	Rada Zolotareva									1	1	1	1
2	Mayuka Aikawa (JPN)										2	0	2
2	Asylzhan Arystanbekova (KAZ)										2	0	2
2	Polina Bakhmutkina										2	0	2
2	Alesia Breaz (ROU)										2	0	2
2	Nikola Břečková (CZE)										2	0	2
2	Evgeniya Burdina										2	0	2
2	Astrid Cirotte (FRA)										2	0	2
2	Defne Çırpanlı (TUR)										2	0	2
2	Kylie Collins (USA)										2	0	2
2	Kaat Coppez (BEL)										2	0	2
2	Iveta Dapkutė (LTU)										2	0	2
2	Ingkar Dyussebay (KAZ)										2	0	2
2	Loes Ebeling Koning (NED)										2	0	2
2	Aya El Sayed (EGY)										2	0	2
2	Tamila Gadamauri (BEL)										2	0	2
2	Elena Giovanna Giessler (GER)										2	0	2
2	Justina María González Daniele (ARG)										2	0	2
2	Anastasia Grechkina										2	0	2
2	Amelie Justine Hejtmanek (CZE)										2	0	2
2	Megan Heuser (USA)										2	0	2
2	Merel Hoedt (NED)										2	0	2
2	Margarita Ignatjeva (LAT)										2	0	2
2	Valentina Ivanov (NZL)										2	0	2
2	Kim Eun-chae (KOR)										2	0	2
2	Ada Kumru (TUR)										2	0	2
2	Valentina Losciale (ITA)										2	0	2
2	Cara Maria Meșter (ROU)										2	0	2
2	Rebecca Munk Mortensen (DEN)										2	0	2
2	Mavie Österreicher (AUT)										2	0	2
2	Maja Pawelska (POL)										2	0	2
2	Annika Penickova (USA)										2	0	2
2	Kristina Penickova (USA)										2	0	2
2	Anna Petkovic (GER)										2	0	2
2	Victoria Pohle (GER)										2	0	2
2	Alyssa Réguer (FRA)										2	0	2
2	Kseniia Ruchkina										2	0	2
2	Madhurima Sawant (IND)										2	0	2
2	Emma Slavíková (CZE)										2	0	2
2	Monika Stankiewicz (POL)										2	0	2
2	Julia Stusek (GER)										2	0	2
2	Carson Tanguilig (USA)										2	0	2
2	Cristiana Nicoleta Todoni (ROU)										2	0	2
2	Demi Tran (NED)										2	0	2
2	Doğa Türkmen (TUR)										2	0	2
2	María Florencia Urrutia (ARG)										2	0	2
2	Karolína Vlčková (CZE)										2	0	2
2	Kamonwan Yodpetch (THA)										2	0	2
2	Alina Yuneva										2	0	2
1	Anna Bondár (HUN)	1										1	0
1	Alina Charaeva	1										1	0
1	Nao Hibino (JPN)	1										1	0
1	Iva Jovic (USA)	1										1	0
1	Tatjana Maria (GER)	1										1	0
1	Caty McNally (USA)	1										1	0
1	Astra Sharma (AUS)	1										1	0
1	Marina Stakusic (CAN)	1										1	0
1	Simona Waltert (SUI)	1										1	0
1	Yuan Yue (CHN)	1										1	0
1	Anastasia Zakharova	1										1	0
1	Renata Zarazúa (MEX)	1										1	0
1	Gao Xinyu (CHN)		1									0	1
1	Arianne Hartono (NED)		1									0	1
1	Victoria Hu (USA)		1									0	1
1	María José Portillo Ramírez (MEX)		1									0	1
1	Mananchaya Sawangkaew (THA)		1									0	1
1	Ena Shibahara (JPN)		1									0	1
1	Aldila Sutjiadi (INA)		1									0	1
1	Prarthana Thombare (IND)		1									0	1
1	Erika Andreeva			1								1	0
1	Julia Avdeeva			1								1	0
1	Kimberly Birrell (AUS)			1								1	0
1	Loïs Boisson (FRA)			1								1	0
1	Elsa Jacquemot (FRA)			1								1	0
1	Kaja Juvan (SLO)			1								1	0
1	Teodora Kostović (SRB)			1								1	0
1	Greet Minnen (BEL)			1								1	0
1	Kyōka Okamura (JPN)			1								1	0
1	Arina Rodionova (AUS)			1								1	0
1	Elena-Gabriela Ruse (ROU)			1								1	0
1	Dominika Šalková (CZE)			1								1	0
1	Daria Snigur (UKR)			1								1	0
1	Panna Udvardy (HUN)			1								1	0
1	Wang Xiyu (CHN)			1								1	0
1	Yao Xinxin (CHN)			1								1	0
1	Tamara Zidanšek (SLO)			1								1	0
1	Robin Anderson (USA)				1							0	1
1	Irina Bara (ROU)				1							0	1
1	Alicia Barnett (GBR)				1							0	1
1	Marie Benoît (BEL)				1							0	1
1	Sophie Chang (USA)				1							0	1
1	Maja Chwalińska (POL)				1							0	1
1	Yuliya Hatouka				1							0	1
1	Isabelle Haverlag (NED)				1							0	1
1	Malene Helgø (NOR)				1							0	1
1	Aoi Ito (JPN)				1							0	1
1	Renáta Jamrichová (SVK)				1							0	1
1	Jang Su-jeong (KOR)				1							0	1
1	Angela Kulikov (USA)				1							0	1
1	Miho Kuramochi (JPN)				1							0	1
1	Elixane Lechemia (FRA)				1							0	1
1	Maria Mateas (USA)				1							0	1
1	Yuriko Lily Miyazaki (GBR)				1							0	1
1	Carole Monnet (FRA)				1							0	1
1	Tara Moore (GBR)				1							0	1
1	Martina Okáľová (SVK)				1							0	1
1	Urszula Radwańska (POL)				1							0	1
1	Arantxa Rus (NED)				1							0	1
1	Shi Han (CHN)				1							0	1
1	Nina Stojanović (SRB)				1							0	1
1	Nina Vargová (SVK)				1							0	1
1	Alexis Blokhina (USA)					1						1	0
1	Carson Branstine (CAN)					1						1	0
1	Haruka Kaji (JPN)					1						1	0
1	Gabriela Lee (ROU)					1						1	0
1	Noma Noha Akugue (GER)					1						1	0
1	Kajsa Rinaldo Persson (SWE)					1						1	0
1	Hanne Vandewinkel (BEL)					1						1	0
1	Aurora Zantedeschi (ITA)					1						1	0
1	Destanee Aiava (AUS)						1					0	1
1	Madeleine Brooks (GBR)						1					0	1
1	Paige Hourigan (NZL)						1					0	1
1	Mana Kawamura (JPN)						1					0	1
1	Elena Malõgina (EST)						1					0	1
1	Alexandra Osborne (AUS)						1					0	1
1	Jana Otzipka (BEL)						1					0	1
1	Anna Ureke						1					0	1
1	Carolina Alves (BRA)							1				1	0
1	Tessah Andrianjafitrimo (FRA)							1				1	0
1	Amarni Banks (GBR)							1				1	0
1	Marina Bassols Ribera (ESP)							1				1	0
1	Madison Brengle (USA)							1				1	0
1	Vitalia Diatchenko							1				1	0
1	Kristina Dmitruk							1				1	0
1	Anna-Lena Friedsam (GER)							1				1	0
1	Amelia Honer (USA)							1				1	0
1	Sakura Hosogi (JPN)							1				1	0
1	Yasmine Kabbaj (MAR)							1				1	0
1	Leonie Küng (SUI)							1				1	0
1	Ma Yexin (CHN)							1				1	0
1	Julie Paštiková (CZE)							1				1	0
1	Tatiana Pieri (ITA)							1				1	0
1	Laura Pigossi (BRA)							1				1	0
1	Lola Radivojević (SRB)							1				1	0
1	Rina Saigo (JPN)							1				1	0
1	Nastasja Schunk (GER)							1				1	0
1	Anastasiia Sobolieva (UKR)							1				1	0
1	Katarina Zavatska (UKR)							1				1	0
1	Vaishnavi Adkar (IND)								1			0	1
1	Amina Anshba								1			0	1
1	Mana Ayukawa (JPN)								1			0	1
1	Maria Berlanga Bandera (ESP)								1			0	1
1	Shrivalli Bhamidipaty (IND)								1			0	1
1	Brooke Black (GBR)								1			0	1
1	Aliona Bolsova (ESP)								1			0	1
1	Elysia Bolton (AUS)								1			0	1
1	Cadence Brace (CAN)								1			0	1
1	Elizabeth Coleman (USA)								1			0	1
1	Tilwith Di Girolami (BEL)								1			0	1
1	Kailey Evans (USA)								1			0	1
1	Julia García Ruiz (MEX)								1			0	1
1	Makenna Jones (USA)								1			0	1
1	Ekaterina Kazionova								1			0	1
1	Daria Lodikova								1			0	1
1	Ekaterina Makarova								1			0	1
1	Marie Mattel (FRA)								1			0	1
1	Jordyn McBride (USA)								1			0	1
1	Ingrid Neel (EST)								1			0	1
1	Rinon Okuwaki (JPN)								1			0	1
1	Victoria Osuigwe (USA)								1			0	1
1	Rebeca Pereira (BRA)								1			0	1
1	Julia Riera (ARG)								1			0	1
1	Victoria Rodríguez (MEX)								1			0	1
1	Antonia Schmidt (GER)								1			0	1
1	Daria Shadchneva								1			0	1
1	Antonia Stoyanov (NED)								1			0	1
1	Gergana Topalova (BUL)								1			0	1
1	Federica Urgesi (ITA)								1			0	1
1	Akasha Urhobo (USA)								1			0	1
1	Candela Vázquez (ARG)								1			0	1
1	Wang Meiling (CHN)								1			0	1
1	Emily Webley-Smith (GBR)								1			0	1
1	Caroline Werner (GER)								1			0	1
1	Sahaja Yamalapalli (IND)								1			0	1
1	Océane Babel (FRA)									1		1	0
1	DJ Bennett (USA)									1		1	0
1	Valeria Bhunu (ZIM)									1		1	0
1	Ann Akasha Ceuca (GER)									1		1	0
1	Chen Mengyi (CHN)									1		1	0
1	Mayu Crossley (JPN)									1		1	0
1	Sara Daavettila (USA)									1		1	0
1	Cristina Diaz Adrover (ESP)									1		1	0
1	Zeel Desai (IND)									1		1	0
1	Federica di Sarra (ITA)									1		1	0
1	Kennedy Drenser-Hagmann (USA)									1		1	0
1	Lidia Encheva (BUL)									1		1	0
1	Sarah Melany Fajmonová (CZE)									1		1	0
1	Mara Gae (ROU)									1		1	0
1	Giselle Isabella Guillen (AUS)									1		1	0
1	Mara Guth (GER)									1		1	0
1	Han Jiangxue (CHN)									1		1	0
1	Ava Hrastar (USA)									1		1	0
1	Eleejah Inisan (FRA)									1		1	0
1	Hina Inoue (USA)									1		1	0
1	Valeriia Iushchenko									1		1	0
1	Victoria Kan									1		1	0
1	Kim Yu-jin (KOR)									1		1	0
1	Petra Konjikušić (SRB)									1		1	0
1	Ana Konjuh (CRO)									1		1	0
1	Barbara Kostecka (POL)									1		1	0
1	Lee Su-ha (KOR)									1		1	0
1	Astrid Lew Yan Foon (FRA)									1		1	0
1	Carmen López Martínez (ESP)									1		1	0
1	Pia Lovrič (SLO)									1		1	0
1	Lu Jiajing (CHN)									1		1	0
1	Dunja Marić (SRB)									1		1	0
1	Ayşegül Mert (TUR)									1		1	0
1	Vlada Mincheva									1		1	0
1	Veronica Miroshnichenko									1		1	0
1	Mao Mushika (JPN)									1		1	0
1	Kayo Nishimura (JPN)									1		1	0
1	Laïa Petretic (FRA)									1		1	0
1	Angelica Raggi (ITA)									1		1	0
1	Ren Yufei (CHN)									1		1	0
1	Sofia Rojas (USA)									1		1	0
1	Federica Sacco (ITA)									1		1	0
1	Laetitia Sarrazin (FRA)									1		1	0
1	Anne Schäfer (GER)									1		1	0
1	Isabella Maria Şerban (ITA)									1		1	0
1	Amy Stevens (AUS)									1		1	0
1	Ranah Stoiber (GBR)									1		1	0
1	Nellie Taraba Wallberg (SWE)									1		1	0
1	Léa Tholey (FRA)									1		1	0
1	Laima Vladson (LTU)									1		1	0
1	Lina Vujović (SRB)									1		1	0
1	Tianmei Wang (USA)									1		1	0
1	Ida Wobker (GER)									1		1	0
1	Ye Shiyu (CHN)									1		1	0
1	Camilla Zanolini (ITA)									1		1	0
1	Arianna Zucchini (ITA)									1		1	0
1	Isabel Adrover Gallego (ESP)										1	0	1
1	Aitiyaguli Aixirefu (CHN)										1	0	1
1	Ekaterina Agureeva										1	0	1
1	Kolie Allen (USA)										1	0	1
1	Ani Amiraghyan (ARM)										1	0	1
1	Maria Andrienko										1	0	1
1	Arina Arifullina										1	0	1
1	Shria Atturu (USA)										1	0	1
1	Catherine Aulia (AUS)										1	0	1
1	Annelin Bakker (NED)										1	0	1
1	Isabella Barrera Aguirre (USA)										1	0	1
1	Victória Luiza Barros (BRA)										1	0	1
1	Karla Bartel (GER)										1	0	1
1	Karola Bejenaru (ROU)										1	0	1
1	Jessica Bertoldo (ITA)										1	0	1
1	June Björk (SWE)										1	0	1
1	Clarissa Blomqvist (FIN)										1	0	1
1	Jade Bornay (FRA)										1	0	1
1	Coco Bosman (NED)										1	0	1
1	Mouna Bouzgarrou (TUN)										1	0	1
1	Jaedan Brown (USA)										1	0	1
1	Maia Ilinca Burcescu (ROU)										1	0	1
1	Elena-Teodora Cadar (ROU)										1	0	1
1	Celia Cerviño Ruiz (ESP)										1	0	1
1	Cheuk Ying Shek (HKG)										1	0	1
1	Sravya Chilakalapudi (IND)										1	0	1
1	Jasmine Conway (GBR)										1	0	1
1	Nikola Daubnerová (SVK)										1	0	1
1	Najah Dawson (JAM)										1	0	1
1	Julieta Estable (ARG)										1	0	1
1	Dia Evtimova (BUL)										1	0	1
1	Yasmin Ezzat (EGY)										1	0	1
1	Živa Falkner (SLO)										1	0	1
1	Claudia Ferrer Pérez (ESP)										1	0	1
1	Nada Fouad (EGY)										1	0	1
1	Letícia Garcia Vidal (BRA)										1	0	1
1	Carolina Gasparini (ITA)										1	0	1
1	Maddalena Giordano (ITA)										1	0	1
1	Patricia Georgiana Goina (ROU)										1	0	1
1	Daria Gorska (POL)										1	0	1
1	Thaísa Grana Pedretti (BRA)										1	0	1
1	Grete Gull (EST)										1	0	1
1	Jéssica Hinojosa Gómez (MEX)										1	0	1
1	Yuka Hosoki (THA)										1	1	0
1	Hou Yanan (CHN)										1	0	1
1	Sarah Iliev (FRA)										1	0	1
1	Elizabeth Ionescu (USA)										1	0	1
1	Heike Janse van Vuuren (RSA)										1	0	1
1	Emma Kamper (DEN)										1	0	1
1	Adithya Karunaratne (HKG)										1	0	1
1	Cherry Kim (KOR)										1	0	1
1	Yuno Kitahara (JPN)										1	0	1
1	Vilma Krebs Hyllested (DEN)										1	0	1
1	Natália Kročková (CZE)										1	0	1
1	Polina Kuharenko										1	0	1
1	İrem Kurt (TUR)										1	0	1
1	Annemarie Lazar (GER)										1	0	1
1	Kateryna Lazarenko (UKR)										1	0	1
1	Emma Léné (FRA)										1	0	1
1	Shihomi Leong (MAS)										1	0	1
1	Polina Leykina										1	0	1
1	Jenny Lim (FRA)										1	0	1
1	Liu Min (CHN)										1	0	1
1	Anne Christine Lutkemeyer Obregon (USA)										1	0	1
1	Susanna Maltby (USA)										1	0	1
1	Margaux Maquet (BEL)										1	0	1
1	Mariia Masiianskaia										1	0	1
1	Christina McHale (USA)										1	0	1
1	Valentina Mediorreal (COL)										1	0	1
1	Victoria Milovanova										1	0	1
1	Moeka Miyata (JPN)										1	0	1
1	Kianah Motosono (USA)										1	0	1
1	Audrey Moutama (FRA)										1	0	1
1	Victoria Mulville (USA)										1	0	1
1	Inês Murta (POR)										1	0	1
1	Lucrezia Musetti (ITA)										1	0	1
1	Anri Nagata (JPN)										1	0	1
1	Elina Nepliy										1	0	1
1	Sera Nishimoto (JPN)										1	0	1
1	Andrea Obradović (SRB)										1	0	1
1	Caterina Odorizzi (ITA)										1	0	1
1	Remika Ohashi (JPN)										1	0	1
1	Michika Ozeki (JPN)										1	0	1
1	Amelia Paszun (POL)										1	0	1
1	Lucie Pawlak (POL)										1	0	1
1	Bella Payne (USA)										1	0	1
1	Dominika Podhajecka (POL)										1	0	1
1	Lilian Poling (USA)										1	0	1
1	Laura Rahnel (EST)										1	0	1
1	Sofia Rocchetti (ITA)										1	0	1
1	Andrea Roots (EST)										1	0	1
1	Zdena Šafářová (CZE)										1	0	1
1	Meshkatolzahra Safi (IRI)										1	0	1
1	Ana Filipa Santos (POR)										1	0	1
1	Naho Sato (JPN)										1	0	1
1	Chantal Sauvant (GER)										1	0	1
1	Erika Sema (JPN)										1	0	1
1	Ekaterina Shalimova										1	0	1
1	Shin Ji-ho (KOR)										1	0	1
1	Daria Shubina (UZB)										1	0	1
1	Oana Georgeta Simion (ROU)										1	0	1
1	Magdaléna Smékalová (CZE)										1	0	1
1	Ksenia Smirnova										1	0	1
1	Jamilah Snells (USA)										1	0	1
1	Kanna Soeda (JPN)										1	0	1
1	Duru Söke (TUR)										1	0	1
1	Marjorie Souza (BRA)										1	0	1
1	Gaia Squarcialupi (ITA)										1	0	1
1	Beatrice Stagno (ITA)										1	0	1
1	Isabella Svahn (SWE)										1	0	1
1	Vlada Svarkovskaia										1	0	1
1	Laura Svatíková (SVK)										1	0	1
1	Meritxell Teixidó García (ESP)										1	0	1
1	Adriana Tkachenko (UKR)										1	0	1
1	María Camila Torres Murcia (COL)										1	0	1
1	Maiko Uchijima (JPN)										1	0	1
1	Isis Louise van den Broek (NED)										1	0	1
1	Arina Vasilescu (ROU)										1	0	1
1	Marie Villet (FRA)										1	0	1
1	Angelina Voloshchuk (POR)										1	0	1
1	Wang Jiayi (CHN)										1	0	1
1	Inka Wawrzkiewicz (POL)										1	0	1
1	Marie Weckerle (LUX)										1	0	1
1	Wi Hwi-won (KOR)										1	0	1
1	Anja Wildgruber (GER)										1	0	1
1	Angelina Wirges (GER)										1	0	1
1	Monika Wojcik (USA)										1	0	1
1	Wu Ho-ching (HKG)										1	0	1
1	Xu Shilin (CHN)										1	0	1
1	Pranjala Yadlapalli (IND)										1	0	1
1	Vivian Yang (NZL)										1	0	1
1	İlay Yörük (TUR)										1	0	1
1	Eva Zabolotnaia (MLD)										1	0	1
1	Maddy Zampardo (USA)										1	0	1
1	Milana Zhabrailova										1	0	1
1	Sonja Zhiyenbayeva (KAZ)										1	0	1
1	Denisa Žoldáková (CZE)										1	0	1
1	Anna Zyryanova										1	0	1

=== Titles won by nation ===
Updated as of 5 January 2026

Total	Nation	W100		W75		W50		W35		W15		Total	
Total	Nation	S	D	S	D	S	D	S	D	S	D	S	D
134	United States (USA)	3	6	1	7	7	10	19	25	21	35	51	83
82	Japan (JPN)	3	4	1	3	4	8	5	26	12	16	25	57
81	Czech Republic (CZE)	1	2	7	15	3	3	7	8	12	23	30	51
76	Germany (GER)	1		2		2	2	7	10	20	32	33	43
73	China (CHN)	2	2	2	5	4	4	2	10	17	25	27	46
56	Italy (ITA)		1	2	1	2	1	13	13	11	12	29	27
54	Spain (ESP)	1	1	1	1	3	4	12	5	14	12	32	22
52	Great Britain (GBR)	1	1	3	5	1	6	7	12	8	8	20	32
51	France (FRA)			3	4	3	3	4	7	13	14	23	28
49	Netherlands (NED)		1		4		1	3	9	8	23	11	38
48	Australia (AUS)	1	1	7	2	2	3	10	8	7	7	27	21
44	Romania (ROU)			1	3	2		1	5	12	20	16	28
43	Poland (POL)		1	1	5	2	3		10	9	12	12	31
43	South Korea (KOR)		1		1	1	2	9	6	4	19	14	29
36	Greece (GRE)				3		4	2	8	4	15	6	30
32	Argentina (ARG)			2		1		6	4	7	12	16	16
28	Slovakia (SVK)				5				4	5	14	5	23
27	Switzerland (SUI)	1	1	1	2		4	3	3	9	3	14	13
26	Serbia (SRB)			1	2			5	4	9	5	15	11
25	Ukraine (UKR)		1	3		2		4	2	4	9	13	12
21	Canada (CAN)	1		2	2	1	3	6	5		1	10	11
20	Belgium (BEL)		1	2	1	1	3	2	1	3	6	8	12
19	Chinese Taipei (TPE)				4		2	4	5	1	3	5	14
18	Thailand (THA)		1		1		1	2	2	5	6	7	11
18	Bulgaria (BUL)				1	2	2		4	8	1	10	8
18	Sweden (SWE)				1	1	1	2	8	2	3	7	11
16	Brazil (BRA)							2	4	4	6	6	10
15	Mexico (MEX)	1	1	1				1	5	1	5	4	11
15	Kazakhstan (KAZ)		2			1	1	1		2	8	4	11
15	India (IND)		1		2		3	1	4	1	3	2	13
15	Indonesia (INA)		1		1	1	1	4	4	3		8	7
14	Egypt (EGY)	2						1		5	6	8	6
14	Latvia (LAT)	1	1						1	4	7	5	9
14	Hungary (HUN)	1		1		1		2	2	3	4	8	6
13	Lithuania (LTU)		1			1	2		1	3	5	4	9
13	Austria (AUT)			7	1	1		2			2	10	3
12	Slovenia (SLO)		1	2	5		1		1	1	1	3	9
11	Croatia (CRO)	3		4	1			1	1	1		9	2
11	Portugal (POR)		2		3	2	2				2	2	9
11	Turkey (TUR)				2					1	8	1	10
9	Colombia (COL)								1		8	0	9
8	Kenya (KEN)						2	1	4		1	1	7
8	Chile (CHI)						1		2	2	3	2	6
7	Hong Kong (HKG)				2		2				3	0	7
7	New Zealand (NZL)						1		2		4	0	7
7	Peru (PER)							2	2	1	2	3	4
7	Finland (FIN)							1	2	3	1	4	3
6	Ecuador (ECU)						1		1		4	0	6
6	Denmark (DEN)									1	5	1	5
4	Georgia (GEO)				1	1		1		1		3	1
4	Burundi (BDI)					2			2			2	2
4	Estonia (EST)						1		1		2	0	4
4	Bosnia and Herzegovina (BIH)							1	3			1	3
4	Morocco (MAR)							1	1		2	1	3
3	Norway (NOR)				1				1		1	0	3
3	Bolivia (BOL)								2		1	0	3
2	North Macedonia (MKD)					1		1				2	0
2	Malta (MLT)							1		1		2	0
2	Kosovo (KOS)								1		1	0	2
1	Zimbabwe (ZIM)									1		1	0
1	Armenia (ARM)										1	0	1
1	Iran (IRI)										1	0	1
1	Jamaica (JAM)										1	0	1
1	Luxembourg (LUX)										1	0	1
1	Malaysia (MAS)										1	0	1
1	Moldova (MLD)										1	0	1
1	South Africa (RSA)										1	0	1
1	Tunisia (TUN)										1	0	1
1	Uzbekistan (UZB)										1	0	1

== See also ==
- 2025 WTA Tour
- 2025 WTA 125 tournaments
- 2025 ATP Challenger Tour
- 2025 ITF Men's World Tennis Tour
