= 2024 Zaragoza Open – Singles =

Singles
- 2024 Zaragoza Open

Final
- Champion: (Japan) Moyuka Uchijima
- Runner-up: (Spain) Jéssica Bouzas Maneiro
- Score: 6–1, 6–2

Events
Singles	Doubles
← 2023 ·	Zaragoza Open	· 2025 →

Viktoriya Tomova was the defending champion but chose not to participate.

Moyuka Uchijima won the title, defeating Jéssica Bouzas Maneiro in the final, 6–1, 6–2.

== Seeds ==
1. (Netherlands) Arantxa Rus (first round)
2. (Italy) Martina Trevisan (quarterfinals)
3. (China) Bai Zhuoxuan (second round)
4. (Spain) Rebeka Masarova (second round)
5. (France) Varvara Gracheva (withdrew)
6. (Spain) Jéssica Bouzas Maneiro (final)
7. (Germany) Jule Niemeier (first round)
8. (United States) Elizabeth Mandlik (first round)

== Draw ==
=== Key ===
- Q = Qualifier
- WC = Wild card
- LL = Lucky loser
- Alt = Alternate
- ITF = ITF entry
- PR = Protected ranking
- SR = Special ranking
- SE = Special exempt
- JE = Junior exempt
- JR = Junior Accelerator Programme entrant
- CO = College Accelerator Programme entrant
- NG = Next Gen Accelerator Program entrant
- w/o = Walkover
- r = Retired
- d = Defaulted

=== Finals ===
Semifinals
(Japan) Moyuka Uchijima	6	6
Oksana Selekhmeteva	4	3
WC	(Spain) Irene Burillo Escorihuela	0	6^{3}
6	(Spain) Jéssica Bouzas Maneiro	6	7^{7}

Final
(Japan) Moyuka Uchijima	6	6
6	(Spain) Jéssica Bouzas Maneiro	1	2

=== Top half ===
First round
1	(Netherlands) A Rus	6	5	4
(Japan) M Uchijima	1	7	6
Q	(Greece) E Christofi	5	4
(Australia) O Gadecki	7	6
Q	(France) A Hesse	3	3
I Shymanovich	6	6
(Spain) G Maristany	6	4	7
7	(Germany) J Niemeier	3	6	5
3	(China) Z Bai	6	6
(Serbia) O Danilović	4	2
WC	(Spain) C Martínez Círez	6	1	6
(Czech Republic) G Knutson	3	6	4
(Italy) N Brancaccio	0	0
O Selekhmeteva	6	6
Q	(Germany) M Hodzic	7^{7}	6
Q	M Melnikova	6^{4}	4

Second round
(Japan) M Uchijima	7	6
(Australia) O Gadecki	5	3
I Shymanovich	6	6
(Spain) G Maristany	0	2
3	(China) Z Bai	3	6	3
WC	(Spain) C Martínez Círez	6	0	6
O Selekhmeteva	6	6
Q	(Germany) M Hodzic	2	3

Quarterfinals
(Japan) M Uchijima	6	7
I Shymanovich	3	5
WC	(Spain) C Martínez Círez	6^{2}	1
O Selekhmeteva	7^{7}	6

Semifinals
(Japan) M Uchijima	6	6
O Selekhmeteva	4	3

=== Bottom half ===
First round
8	(United States) E Mandlik	5	6	6^{2}
Q	V Miroshnichenko	7	3	7^{7}
Q	(Romania) G Lee	6	2	6^{2}
WC	(Spain) I Burillo Escorihuela	1	6	7^{7}
(France) L Jeanjean	3	2
WC	(Spain) L Romero Gormaz	6	6
Q	(United Kingdom) N Bains	5	4
4	(Spain) R Masarova	7	6
6	(Spain) J Bouzas Maneiro	6	6
Q	(Italy) C Rosatello	1	1
LL	(Spain) L Cortez Llorca	1	7	1
(Serbia) N Stevanović	6	5	6
(Romania) M Bulgaru	6	5	3
(Czech Republic) T Martincová	2	7	6
WC	(Spain) K Quevedo	4	5
2	(Italy) M Trevisan	6	7

Second round
Q	V Miroshnichenko	2	3
WC	(Spain) I Burillo Escorihuela	6	6
WC	(Spain) L Romero Gormaz	6	6
4	(Spain) R Masarova	4	4
6	(Spain) J Bouzas Maneiro	6	6
(Serbia) N Stevanović	1	2
(Czech Republic) T Martincová	1	4
2	(Italy) M Trevisan	6	6

Quarterfinals
WC	(Spain) I Burillo Escorihuela	6	6
WC	(Spain) L Romero Gormaz	4	3
6	(Spain) J Bouzas Maneiro	6	7
2	(Italy) M Trevisan	2	5

Semifinals
WC	(Spain) I Burillo Escorihuela	0	6^{3}
6	(Spain) J Bouzas Maneiro	6	7^{7}
