= 2023 Zaragoza Open – Doubles =

Doubles
- 2023 Zaragoza Open

Final
- Champions: (France) Diane Parry (Netherlands) Arantxa Rus
- Runners-up: (United States) Asia Muhammad (United Kingdom) Eden Silva
- Score: 6–1, 4–6, [10–5]

Events
Singles	Doubles
Zaragoza Open	· 2024 →

This was the first edition of the tournament.

Diane Parry and Arantxa Rus won the title, defeating Asia Muhammad and Eden Silva in the final, 6–1, 4–6, [10–5].

== Seeds ==
1. (Venezuela) Andrea Gámiz / (Netherlands) Eva Vedder (first round)
2. Amina Anshba / (Czech Republic) Anastasia Dețiuc (quarterfinals)
3. (Czech Republic) Jesika Malečková / (Czech Republic) Renata Voráčová (quarterfinals)
4. (United Kingdom) Freya Christie / (United Kingdom) Ali Collins (quarterfinals)

== Draw ==
=== Key ===
- Q = Qualifier
- WC = Wild card
- LL = Lucky loser
- Alt = Alternate
- SE = Special exempt
- PR = Protected ranking
- ITF = ITF entry
- JE = Junior exempt
- w/o = Walkover
- r = Retired
- d = Defaulted
- SR = Special ranking

First round
1	(Venezuela) A Gámiz (Netherlands) E Vedder	6	1	[9]
(United States) A Muhammad (United Kingdom) E Silva	2	6	[11]
(Italy) A Moratelli (Serbia) N Stevanović	6	6
(Spain) L Cortez Llorca (Spain) R Vicens Mas	4	3
4	(United Kingdom) F Christie (United Kingdom) A Collins	6	7^{7}
(Montenegro) D Kovinić; A Panova	4	6^{4}
(Spain) I Burillo Escorihuela (Spain) A Lázaro García	6	6
WC	(Spain) C Ansón Sánchez (Spain) A Palazón	0	0
(France) D Parry (Netherlands) A Rus	2	6	[10]
(Spain) L Romero Gormaz (Romania) IL Roșca	6	1	[8]
(Germany) V Heisen (Czech Republic) T Martincová	4	2
3	(Czech Republic) J Malečková (Czech Republic) R Voráčová	6	6
A Fomina-Klotz; E Yashina	6	6
WC	(Spain) S Alejo (Spain) A Cortés	2	0
WC	(Spain) Á Fita Boluda (India) V Shinde	2	4
2	A Anshba (Czech Republic) A Dețiuc	6	6

Quarterfinals
(United States) A Muhammad (United Kingdom) E Silva	6	6
(Italy) A Moratelli (Serbia) N Stevanović	0	2
4	(United Kingdom) F Christie (United Kingdom) A Collins	3	2
(Spain) I Burillo Escorihuela (Spain) A Lázaro García	6	6
(France) D Parry (Netherlands) A Rus	6	6
3	(Czech Republic) J Malečková (Czech Republic) R Voráčová	2	2
A Fomina-Klotz; E Yashina	6	5	[11]
2	A Anshba (Czech Republic) A Dețiuc	2	7	[9]

Semifinals
(United States) A Muhammad (United Kingdom) E Silva	7^{7}	6
(Spain) I Burillo Escorihuela (Spain) A Lázaro García	6^{1}	1
(France) D Parry (Netherlands) A Rus	6	6
A Fomina-Klotz; E Yashina	2	2

Final
(United States) A Muhammad (United Kingdom) E Silva	1	6	[5]
(France) D Parry (Netherlands) A Rus	6	4	[10]
