= 2023 Zaragoza Open – Singles =

Singles
- 2023 Zaragoza Open

Final
- Champion: (Bulgaria) Viktoriya Tomova
- Runner-up: (Czech Republic) Tereza Martincová
- Score: 4–6, 6–2, 6–3

Events
Singles	Doubles
Zaragoza Open	· 2024 →

This was the first edition of the tournament.

Viktoriya Tomova won the title, defeating Tereza Martincová in the final, 4–6, 6–2, 6–3.

== Seeds ==
1. (Montenegro) Danka Kovinić (second round)
2. (Bulgaria) Viktoriya Tomova (champion)
3. (France) Océane Dodin (second round)
4. (Czech Republic) Tereza Martincová (final)
5. (France) Diane Parry (first round)
6. (Netherlands) Arantxa Rus (quarterfinals)
7. Erika Andreeva (first round)
8. (France) Jessika Ponchet (semifinals)

== Draw ==
=== Key ===
- Q = Qualifier
- WC = Wild card
- LL = Lucky loser
- Alt = Alternate
- ITF = ITF entry
- PR = Protected ranking
- SR = Special ranking
- SE = Special exempt
- JE = Junior exempt
- JR = Junior Accelerator Programme entrant
- CO = College Accelerator Programme entrant
- NG = Next Gen Accelerator Program entrant
- w/o = Walkover
- r = Retired
- d = Defaulted

=== Finals ===
Semifinals
8	(France) Jessika Ponchet	6^{7}	3
4	(Czech Republic) Tereza Martincová	7^{9}	6
(Spain) Leyre Romero Gormaz	4	3
2	(Bulgaria) Viktoriya Tomova	6	6

Final
4	(Czech Republic) Tereza Martincová	6	2	3
2	(Bulgaria) Viktoriya Tomova	4	6	6

=== Top half ===
First round
1	(Montenegro) D Kovinić	6	3	6
(Spain) J Bouzas Maneiro	2	6	1
(United States) A Muhammad	7	5	3
(France) C Paquet	5	7	6
(Hong Kong) A Karunaratne	7^{7}	7^{7}
PR	(Bulgaria) S Karatantcheva	6^{5}	6^{3}
Q	(United States) A Lahey	6	3	6^{3}
8	(France) J Ponchet	4	6	7^{7}
4	(Czech Republic) T Martincová	7	6
Q	(Romania) IL Roșca	5	2
(Spain) Á Fita Boluda	2	2
Q	K Zaytseva	6	6
Q	(Venezuela) A Gámiz	1	2
WC	A Pavlyuchenkova	6	6
Q	(Germany) Jo Steur	1	6^{2}
6	(Netherlands) A Rus	6	7^{7}

Second round
1	(Montenegro) D Kovinić	6	4	5
(France) C Paquet	3	6	7
(Hong Kong) A Karunaratne	5	2
8	(France) J Ponchet	7	6
4	(Czech Republic) T Martincová	6	7^{7}
Q	K Zaytseva	4	6^{3}
WC	A Pavlyuchenkova	2	3
6	(Netherlands) A Rus	6	6

Quarterfinals
(France) C Paquet	5	6	3
8	(France) J Ponchet	7	3	6
4	(Czech Republic) T Martincová	6	6
6	(Netherlands) A Rus	1	4

Semifinals
8	(France) J Ponchet	6^{7}	3
4	(Czech Republic) T Martincová	7^{9}	6

=== Bottom half ===
First round
7	E Andreeva	5	6^{5}
Q	(France) M Rouvroy	7	7^{7}
(Serbia) N Stevanović	6	6
JE	(Czech Republic) L Havlíčková	3	2
(Spain) L Romero Gormaz	6	5	6
(Spain) R Vicens Mas	4	7	2
Q	(Czech Republic) J Malečková	7^{8}	2	6^{4}
3	(France) O Dodin	6^{6}	6	7^{7}
5	(France) D Parry	3	4
WC	(Spain) I Burillo Escorihuela	6	6
WC	(Spain) A Lázaro García	6	2	6
(Netherlands) E Vedder	1	6	2
WC	(Spain) A Palazón	2	0
(Croatia) A Konjuh	6	6
Q	(Spain) L Cortez Llorca	4	1
2	(Bulgaria) V Tomova	6	6

Second round
Q	(France) M Rouvroy	5	6^{3}
(Serbia) N Stevanović	7	7^{7}
(Spain) L Romero Gormaz	7	6
3	(France) O Dodin	5	0
WC	(Spain) I Burillo Escorihuela	6	6
WC	(Spain) A Lázaro García	4	2
(Croatia) A Konjuh	4	5
2	(Bulgaria) V Tomova	6	7

Quarterfinals
(Serbia) N Stevanović	6	5	3
(Spain) L Romero Gormaz	4	7	6
WC	(Spain) I Burillo Escorihuela	3	4
2	(Bulgaria) V Tomova	6	6

Semifinals
(Spain) L Romero Gormaz	4	3
2	(Bulgaria) V Tomova	6	6
