= 2024 Zaragoza Open – Doubles =

Doubles
- 2024 Zaragoza Open

Final
- Champions: (Czech Republic) Miriam Kolodziejová (Czech Republic) Anna Sisková
- Runners-up: (Italy) Angelica Moratelli (Italy) Camilla Rosatello
- Score: 6–2, 6–3

Events
Singles	Doubles
- Zaragoza Open

Diane Parry and Arantxa Rus were the defending champions but Parry chose not to participate. Rus partnered alongside Amandine Hesse but lost in the first round to Isabelle Haverlag and Moyuka Uchijima.

Miriam Kolodziejová and Anna Sisková won the title, defeating Angelica Moratelli and Camilla Rosatello in the final, 6–2, 6–3.

== Seeds ==
1. (Italy) Angelica Moratelli / (Italy) Camilla Rosatello (final)
2. (Czech Republic) Miriam Kolodziejová / (Czech Republic) Anna Sisková (champions)
3. (United Kingdom) Naiktha Bains / (United Kingdom) Maia Lumsden (first round)
4. Alena Fomina-Klotz / Iryna Shymanovich (semifinals)

== Draw ==
Key

- Q = Qualifier
- WC = Wild card
- LL = Lucky loser
- Alt = Alternate
- ITF = ITF entry
- PR = Protected ranking
- SR = Special ranking
- SE = Special exempt
- JE = Junior exempt
- JR = Junior Accelerator Programme entrant
- CO = College Accelerator Programme entrant
- NG = Next Gen Accelerator Program entrant
- w/o = Walkover
- r = Retired
- d = Defaulted

First round
1	(Italy) A Moratelli (Italy) C Rosatello	6	6
WC	(Spain) S Alejo (Spain) A Palazón	1	2
(Ukraine) M Kolb (Ukraine) N Kolb	6	7^{8}
(United States) A Rogers (Australia) O Tjandramulia	4	6^{6}
4	A Fomina-Klotz; I Shymanovich	6	6
(Spain) J Bouzas Maneiro (Spain) L Romero Gormaz	1	2
WC	(Spain) C Ansón Sánchez (Spain) C Esquiva Bañuls	2	4
WC	(Spain) I Burillo Escorihuela (Spain) C Martínez Círez	6	6
(United Kingdom) A Barnett (United Kingdom) F Christie	w/o
(France) L Jeanjean (Romania) G Lee
(Czech Republic) G Knutson; V Miroshnichenko	7	6
3	(United Kingdom) N Bains (United Kingdom) M Lumsden	5	2
(Netherlands) I Haverlag (Japan) M Uchijima	7^{7}	6
(France) A Hesse (Netherlands) A Rus	6^{5}	4
(United Kingdom) S Murray Sharan (Poland) K Piter	3	4
2	(Czech Republic) M Koloziejová (Czech Republic) A Sisková	6	6

Quarterfinals
1	(Italy) A Moratelli (Italy) C Rosatello	7	6
(Ukraine) M Kolb (Ukraine) N Kolb	5	2
4	A Fomina-Klotz; I Shymanovich	6	6
WC	(Spain) I Burillo Escorihuela (Spain) C Martínez Círez	2	4
(United Kingdom) A Barnett (United Kingdom) F Christie	7^{7}	6^{3}	[10]
(Czech Republic) G Knutson; V Miroshnichenko	6^{5}	7^{7}	[5]
(Netherlands) I Haverlag (Japan) M Uchijima	6	2	[6]
2	(Czech Republic) M Koloziejová (Czech Republic) A Sisková	3	6	[10]

Semifinals
1	(Italy) A Moratelli (Italy) C Rosatello	6	6
4	A Fomina-Klotz; I Shymanovich	3	4
(United Kingdom) A Barnett (United Kingdom) F Christie	5	6^{3}
2	(Czech Republic) M Koloziejová (Czech Republic) A Sisková	7	7^{7}

Final
1	(Italy) A Moratelli (Italy) C Rosatello	2	3
2	(Czech Republic) M Koloziejová (Czech Republic) A Sisková	6	6
