= 2025 ITF Men's World Tennis Tour =

Entry-level tennis series

Details
- Duration: January – December 2025
- Edition: 28th
- Categories: M25 tournaments M15 tournaments

Achievements (singles)

The 2025 International Tennis Federation (ITF) Men's World Tennis Tour is an entry level tour for men's professional tennis. It is organized by the International Tennis Federation and is a tier below the ATP Challenger Tour. The men's tour includes tournaments with prize money of either $US15,000 (M15) or $30,000 (M25). The results of ITF tournaments are incorporated into the ATP ranking, which enables professionals to progress to the ATP Challenger Tour and ATP Tour, and ultimately the Grand Slams. The ITF offers approximately 550 tournaments across 70 countries.

Since 2022, following the Russian invasion of Ukraine the ITF announced that players from Belarus and Russia could still play on the tour but would not be allowed to play under the flag of Belarus or Russia.

== Cancelled/postponed tournaments ==
The following tournaments were formally announced by the ITF before being subsequently cancelled or postponed.

Week of	Tournament	Status

== Participating host nations ==
- Angola (ANG)
- Argentina (ARG)
- Armenia (ARM)
- Australia (AUS)
- Austria (AUT)
- Bahrain (BHR)
- Belgium (BEL)
- Bolivia (BOL)
- Bosnia and Herzegovina (BIH)
- Brazil (BRA)
- Bulgaria (BUL)
- Canada (CAN)
- Chile (CHI)
- China (CHN)
- Chinese Taipei (TPE)
- Colombia (COL)
- Congo (COG)
- Croatia (CRO)
- Cyprus (CYP)
- Czech Republic (CZE)
- Denmark (DEN)
- Dominican Republic (DOM)
- Egypt (EGY)
- El Salvador (ESA)
- Finland (FIN)
- France (FRA)
- Georgia (GEO)
- Germany (GER)
- Great Britain (GBR)
- Greece (GRE)
- Guam (GUM)
- Hong Kong (HKG)
- Hungary (HUN)
- India (IND)
- Indonesia (INA)
- Iran (IRI)
- Ireland (IRE)
- Italy (ITA)
- Jamaica (JAM)
- Japan (JPN)
- Kazakhstan (KAZ)
- Kuwait (KUW)
- Luxembourg (LUX)
- Malaysia (MAS)
- Malta (MLT)
- Mexico (MEX)
- Morocco (MAR)
- Netherlands (NED)
- New Zealand (NZL)
- Norway (NOR)
- Paraguay (PAR)
- Peru (PER)
- Poland (POL)
- Portugal (POR)
- Qatar (QAT)
- Romania (ROU)
- Rwanda (RWA)
- Serbia (SRB)
- Singapore (SGP)
- Slovakia (SVK)
- Slovenia (SLO)
- South Africa (RSA)
- South Korea (KOR)
- Spain (ESP)
- Sweden (SWE)
- Switzerland (SUI)
- Thailand (THA)
- Tunisia (TUN)
- Turkey (TUR)
- Uganda (UGA)
- United States (USA)
- Uruguay (URU)
- Uzbekistan (UZB)
- Vietnam (VIE)

== Ranking points distribution ==
Category	W	F	SF	QF	R16	R32	Q	Q2	Q1
↓ ATP Ranking Points ↓
M25+H (S) / M25 (S)	25	16	8	3	1	–	–	–	–
M25+H (D) / M25 (D)	25	16	8	3	–	–	–	–	–
M15+H (S) / M15 (S)	15	8	4	2	1	–	–	–	–
M15+H (D) / M15 (D)	15	8	4	2	–	–	–	–	–
↓ ITF World Tennis Ranking Points ↓
M25+H (S)	–	–	–	–	–	–	4	1	–
M25 (S)	–	–	–	–	–	–	3	1	–
M15+H (S)	–	–	–	–	–	–	3	1	–
M15 (S)	–	–	–	–	–	–	2	1	–

- "+H" indicates that hospitality is provided.

== Prize money distribution ==
Category	W	F	SF	QF	R16	R32
M25+H (S) / M25 (S)	$4,612	$2,701	$1,550	$905	$495	$319
M25+H (D) / M25 (D)	$1,782	$1,023	$627	$323	$194	–
M15+H (S) / M15 (S)	$2,160	$1,272	$753	$438	$258	$156
M15+H (D) / M15 (D)	$930	$540	$324	$192	$108	–

- Doubles prize money per team

== Statistics ==
These tables present the number of singles (S) and doubles (D) titles won by each player and each nation during the season. The players/nations are sorted by:

1. Total number of titles (a doubles title won by two players representing the same nation counts as only one win for the nation)
2. A singles > doubles hierarchy
3. Alphabetical order (by family names for players).

To avoid confusion and double counting, these tables should be updated only after all events of the week are completed.

=== Titles won by nation ===
Updated as of 31 December

Total	Nation	M25		M15		Total	
Total	Nation	S	D	S	D	S	D
123	United States (USA)	12	32	32	47	44	79
120	Great Britain (GBR)	36	26	25	33	61	59
115	Italy (ITA)	23	20	36	36	59	56
106	France (FRA)	25	24	36	21	61	45
85	Spain (ESP)	13	22	22	28	35	50
73	Germany (GER)	11	14	17	31	28	45
59	Japan (JPN)	5	14	15	25	20	39
48	Argentina (ARG)	4	9	17	18	21	27
42	Australia (AUS)	13	11	8	10	21	21
42	Brazil (BRA)	8	14	8	12	16	26
35	Ukraine (UKR)	3	7	10	15	13	22
33	Czech Republic (CZE)	6	15	4	8	10	23
33	South Korea (KOR)	3	2	8	20	11	22
30	India (IND)	2	7	8	13	10	20
29	Romania (ROU)	3	2	11	13	14	15
28	Belgium (BEL)	8	5	8	7	16	12
27	Switzerland (SUI)	8	4	6	9	14	13
26	Netherlands (NED)	3	7	1	15	4	22
21	Serbia (SRB)		5	8	8	8	13
20	Sweden (SWE)	1	3	6	10	7	13
20	Turkey (TUR)	1	2	7	10	8	12
19	Portugal (POR)	5	10		4	5	14
19	China (CHN)	1	4	6	8	7	12
17	Poland (POL)	4		4	9	8	9
17	Bosnia and Herzegovina (BIH)	3	2	7	5	10	7
17	Greece (GRE)	3		6	8	9	8
17	Canada (CAN)		5	4	8	4	13
15	Tunisia (TUN)	3	1	4	7	7	8
14	South Africa (RSA)	2	4	4	4	6	8
14	Croatia (CRO)	1	6	4	3	5	9
13	Hungary (HUN)	1		5	7	6	7
11	Chinese Taipei (TPE)		6	2	3	2	9
11	Bulgaria (BUL)		2	5	4	5	6
10	Georgia (GEO)	2	1	4	3	6	4
10	Slovakia (SVK)	1	2	4	3	5	5
10	Austria (AUT)	1	2	3	4	4	6
10	Denmark (DEN)	1	2		7	1	9
10	Uruguay (URU)		5	1	4	1	9
10	Thailand (THA)		1	3	6	3	7
10	Morocco (MAR)			3	7	3	7
9	Finland (FIN)	1	4		4	1	8
9	New Zealand (NZL)		5	1	3	1	8
8	Uzbekistan (UZB)	2	1	1	4	3	5
7	Estonia (EST)	2	1		4	2	5
7	Egypt (EGY)	1		3	3	4	3
7	Mexico (MEX)		1	1	5	1	6
6	Colombia (COL)	2		2	2	4	2
6	Venezuela (VEN)		1		5	0	6
6	Chile (CHI)			1	5	1	5
6	Cyprus (CYP)				6	0	6
5	Dominican Republic (DOM)	4			1	4	1
5	Slovenia (SLO)	1		1	3	2	3
5	Ireland (IRE)		3	1	1	1	4
5	Latvia (LAT)		2		3	0	5
5	Luxembourg (LUX)			1	4	1	4
4	Ecuador (ECU)	4				4	0
4	Ghana (GHA)		2		2	0	4
4	Kazakhstan (KAZ)		1	1	2	1	3
4	Indonesia (INA)		1		3	0	4
3	Paraguay (PAR)	3				3	0
3	Moldova (MDA)		2	1		1	2
2	Guadeloupe (GPE)		2			0	2
2	Israel (ISR)		2			0	2
2	Costa Rica (CRC)		1		1	0	2
2	Peru (PER)		1		1	0	2
1	Jamaica (JAM)	1				1	0
1	Antigua and Barbuda (ATG)		1			0	1
1	Bolivia (BOL)		1			0	1
1	Ivory Coast (CIV)		1			0	1
1	Mozambique (MOZ)		1			0	1
1	Iran (IRN)			1		1	0
1	Algeria (ALG)				1	0	1
1	Malaysia (MAS)				1	0	1
1	Norway (NOR)				1	0	1
1	Poland (POL)				1	0	1
1	Senegal (SEN)				1	0	1

== See also ==
- 2025 ATP Tour
- 2025 ATP Challenger Tour
- 2025 WTA Tour
- 2025 ITF Women's World Tennis Tour
