= Jennifer Ruggeri =

Italian tennis player (born 2003)

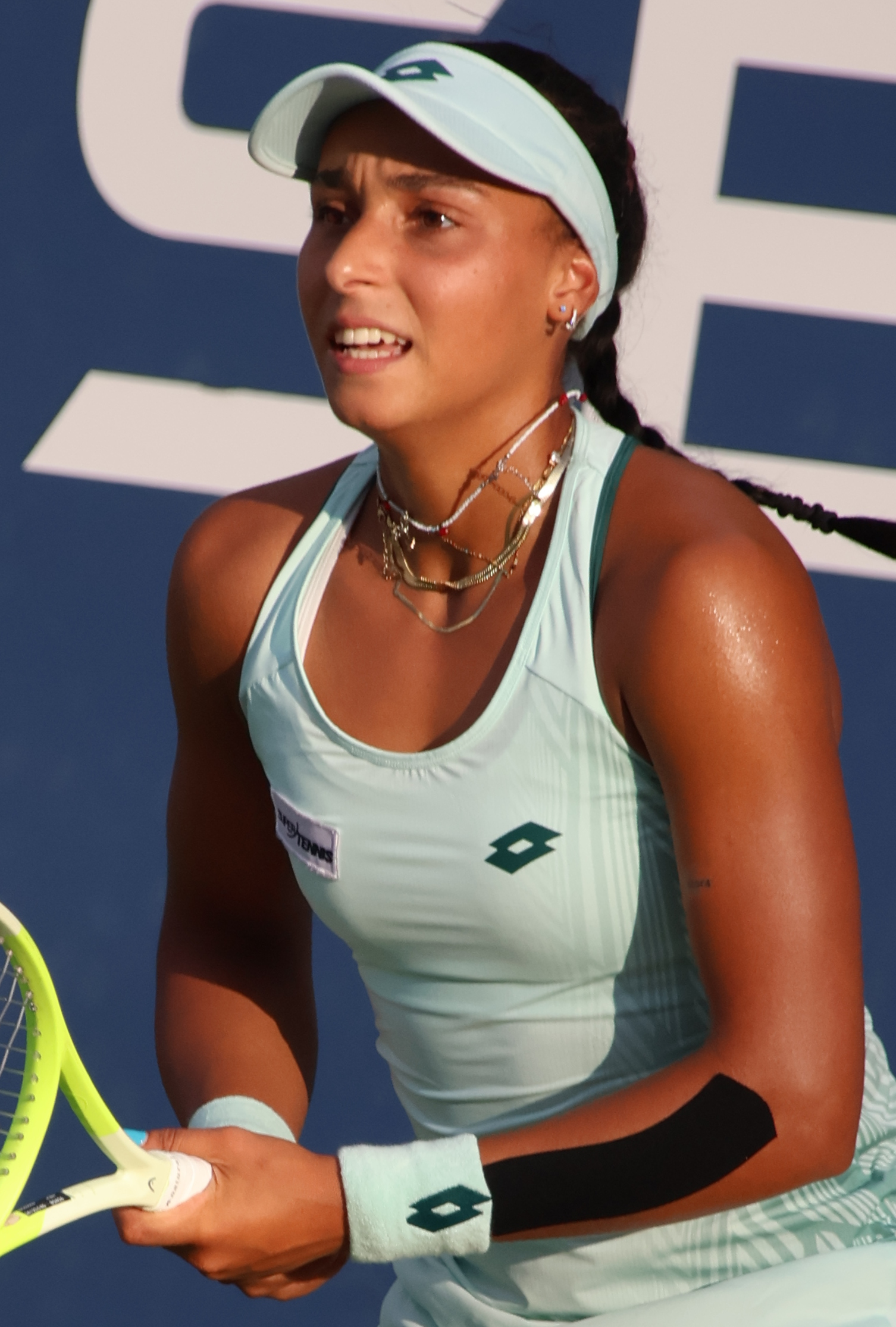
- Ruggeri at the 2026 US Open
- Country (sports): Italy
- Born: 23 July 2003 (age 23) Civitanova Marche, Italy
- Prize money: $154,682

Singles
- Career record: 155–117
- Career titles: 5 ITF
- Highest ranking: No. 207 (22 June 2026)
- Current ranking: No. 235 (28 September 2026)

Grand Slam singles results
- US Open: Q1 (2026)

Doubles
- Career record: 49–56
- Career titles: 1 ITF
- Highest ranking: No. 372 (18 May 2026)
- Current ranking: No. 421 (28 September 2026)
- Last updated on: 30 September 2026.

Jennifer Ruggeri (born 23 July 2003) is an Italian professional tennis player.

Ruggeri has a career-high singles ranking by the WTA of 207, achieved on 22 June 2026, and a best in doubles of world No. 372, reached on 18 May 2026.

== Career ==
=== 2025: Three ITF singles titles ===
In August 2025, she won her first singles title at the W35 tournament in Trieste. The following week, she won the W15 event in Fiano Romano. In September 2025, she won the W35 event in Santa Margherita di Pula.

=== 2026: WTA Tour debut ===
In February 2026, she won her first doubles championship at the W35 event in Antalya. In March 2026, she was runner-up at the W50 event in Heraklion.

Ruggeri made her WTA Tour main-draw debut at the 2026 Italian Open in Rome, where she received a wildcard entry but lost to Zeynep Sönmez, in three sets. Ruggeri made her WTA Tour main-draw debut at the Italian Open in Rome, where she received a wildcard entry, partnering fellow Italian Tyra Caterina Grant. In the first round, she lost the Romanian duo Sorana Cîrstea and Jaqueline Cristian in two sets.

== ITF Circuit finals ==
=== Singles: 8 (5 titles, 3 runner-ups) ===
Legend W75 tournaments (1–0) W50 tournaments (0–1) W35 tournaments (3–1) W15 tournaments (1–1)	Finals by surface Clay (5–3)

Result	W–L	Date	Tournament	Tier	Surface	Opponent	Score
Loss	0–1	Jul 2025	ITF Casablanca, Morocco	W15	Clay	Ekaterina Reyngold	2–6, 3–6
Win	1–1	Aug 2025	ITF Trieste, Italy	W35	Clay	(Italy) Samira De Stefano	6–4, 2–6, 6–4
Win	2–1	Sep 2025	ITF Fiano Romano, Italy	W15	Clay	(Germany) Eva Marie Voracek	6–4, 6–3
Win	3–1	Sep 2025	ITF Santa Margherita di Pula, Italy	W35	Clay	(France) Sara Cakarevic	6–4, 6–2
Loss	3–2	Oct 2025	ITF Santa Margherita di Pula	W35	Clay	(Czech Republic) Julie Štruplová	6–2, 2–6, 4–6
Loss	3–3	Mar 2026	ITF Heraklion, Greece	W50	Clay	(Spain) Irene Burillo	5–7, 2–6
Win	4–3	May 2026	Zaragoza Open, Spain	W75	Clay	(United States) Kayla Day	3–6, 6–3, 7–6^{(3)}
Win	5–3	Oct 2026	ITF Santa Margherita di Pula	W35	Clay	(Spain) Ane Mintegi del Olmo	7–5, 6–2

=== Doubles: 9 (1 title, 8 runner-ups) ===
Legend W25/35 tournaments (1–5) W15 tournaments (0–3)	Finals by surface Hard (0–1) Clay (1–7)

Result	W–L	Date	Tournament	Tier	Surface	Partner	Opponents	Score
Loss	0–1	Sep 2022	ITF Santa Margherita di Pula, Italy	W25	Clay	(Bolivia) Noelia Zeballos	(Italy) Angelica Moratelli (Italy) Camilla Rosatello	4–6, 4–6
Loss	0–2	Mar 2023	ITF Monastir, Tunisia	W15	Hard	(Italy) Angelica Raggi	(Netherlands) Anouk Koevermans (Netherlands) Marente Sijbesma	4–6, 3–6
Loss	0–3	Jul 2025	ITF Casablanca, Morocco	W15	Clay	(Italy) Camilla Gennaro	Maria Andrienko (Belgium) Margaux Maquet	1–6, 4–6
Loss	0–4	Aug 2025	ITF Brasov, Romania	W15	Clay	(Italy) Angelica Raggi	(Romania) Alexandra Irina Anghel (Romania) Carmen Andreea Herea	3–6, 2–6
Loss	0–5	Aug 2025	ITF Trieste, Italy	W35	Clay	(Italy) Aurora Corvi	(Italy) Samira De Stefano (Italy) Alessandra Mazzola	3–6, 0–6
Loss	0–6	Sep 2025	ITF Santa Margherita di Pula, Italy	W35	Clay	(Italy) Marta Lombardini	(Italy) Noemi Basiletti (Italy) Giorgia Pedone	2–6, 7–6^{(6)}, [8–10]
Win	1–6	Feb 2026	ITF Antalya, Turkiye	W35	Clay	(Italy) Aurora Zantedeschi	(Argentina) Luisina Giovannini (Chile) Antónia Vergara Rivera	6–4, 7–6^{(1)}
Loss	1–7	Feb 2026	ITF Antalya, Turkiye	W35	Clay	(Italy) Aurora Zantedeschi	(Germany) Joëlle Steur (Slovakia) Nina Vargová	6–1, 6–7^{(3)}, [7–10]
Loss	1–8	Mar 2026	ITF Santa Margherita di Pula, Italy	W35	Clay	(Italy) Tyra Caterina Grant	(Italy) Enola Chiesa (Latvia) Beatrise Zeltiņa	4–6, 7–6^{(3)}, [7–10]
