= Zaragoza Open =

- 2026 Zaragoza Open

Women's World Tennis Tour
- Event name: Zaragoza Open
- Location: Zaragoza, Spain
- Venue: S.D. Tiro de Pichón
- Category: ITF Women's World Tennis Tour
- Surface: Clay
- Draw: 32S/32Q/16D
- Prize money: $60,000

The Zaragoza Open is a tournament for professional female tennis players. The event is classified as a $60,000 ITF Women's World Tennis Tour tournament and has been held in Zaragoza, Spain, since 2023 on outdoor clay courts. In 2023 the prize money was $80,000, between 2024 and 2025 it was upgraded to $100,000. Since 2026, prize money has been reduced to $60,000.

== Past finals ==
=== Singles ===
Year	Champion	Runner-up	Score
2026	(Italy) Jennifer Ruggeri	(United States) Kayla Day	3–6, 6–3, 7–6^{(7–3)}
2025	Anastasia Zakharova	(Spain) Kaitlin Quevedo	6–3, 6–1
2024	(Japan) Moyuka Uchijima	(Spain) Jéssica Bouzas Maneiro	6–1, 6–2
2023	(Bulgaria) Viktoriya Tomova	(Czech Republic) Tereza Martincová	4–6, 6–2, 6–3

=== Doubles ===
Year	Champions	Runners-up	Score
2026	(Spain) Yvonne Cavallé Reimers (Spain) Ángela Fita Boluda	(United States) Ayana Akli (Belgium) Lara Salden	6–4, 6–4
2025	(Australia) Olivia Gadecki (Indonesia) Aldila Sutjiadi	(Spain) Aliona Bolsova (Spain) Ángela Fita Boluda	6–4, 6–3
2024	(Czech Republic) Miriam Kolodziejová (Czech Republic) Anna Sisková	(Italy) Angelica Moratelli (Italy) Camilla Rosatello	6–2, 6–3
2023	(France) Diane Parry (Netherlands) Arantxa Rus	(United States) Asia Muhammad (United Kingdom) Eden Silva	6–1, 4–6, [10–5]
