= Jana Otzipka =

Belgian tennis player (born 2005)

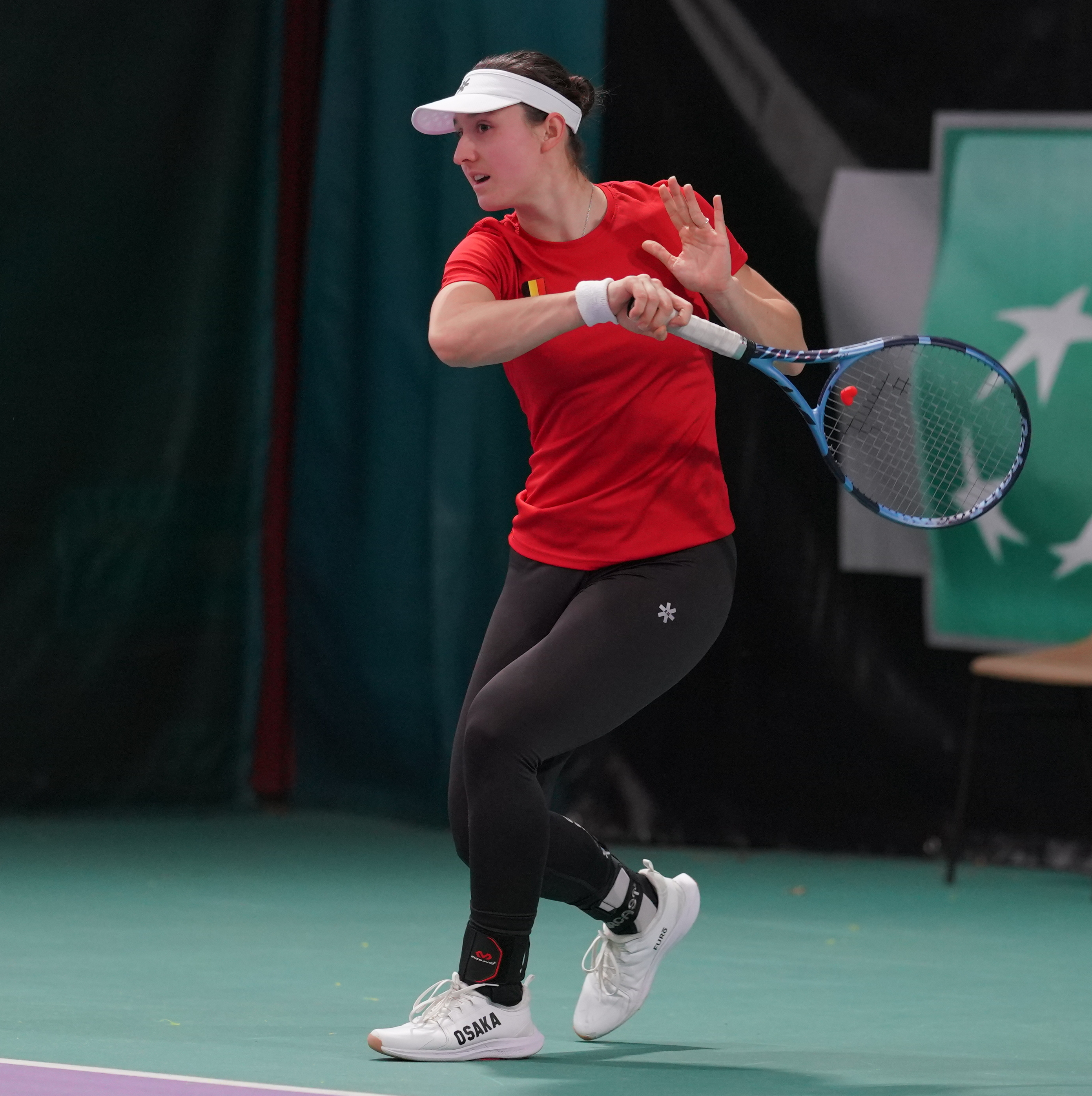
- Country (sports): Belgium
- Born: 1 February 2005 (age 21) Antwerp, Belgium
- Plays: Right-handed (two-handed backhand)
- Prize money: US$19,477

Singles
- Career record: 55–44
- Highest ranking: No. 561 (3 November 2025)
- Current ranking: No. 562 (31 December 2025)

Doubles
- Career record: 15–16
- Highest ranking: No. 506 (5 May 2025)
- Current ranking: No. 539 (31 December 2025)
Medal record
Representing Belgium
World University Games
Bronze medal – third place	2025 Rhine-Ruhr	Singles
- Last updated on: 31 December 2025.

Jana Otzipka (born February 1, 2005) is a Belgian tennis player.

In November 2025, she achieved a career-high ranking of No. 561 in women's singles by the Women's Tennis Association (WTA), and finished the year at No. 562. In May 2025, she achieved a career-high of No. 506 in women's doubles, finishing the year at No. 539.

In April 2025, played the biggest final of her career in Spain. She became the champion in doubles with her German partner Gina Marie Dittmann at the International Tennis Federation (ITF) W50, in Yecla, where she won the first championship of her career.

== ITF Circuit finals ==
=== Doubles: 2 (1 titles, 1 runner-ups) ===
Legend W50 tournaments W35 tournaments	Finals by surface Hard (1–1)

Result	W–L	Date	Tournament	Tier	Surface	Partner	Opponents	Score
Loss	0–1	Nov 2024	ITF Villeneuve-d'Ascq, France	W35	Hard	(Netherlands) Danique Havermans	(Cyprus) Daria Frayman (France) Marie Mattel	7–6^{(5)}, 2–6, [8–10]
Win	1–1	Apr 2025	ITF Yecla, Spain	W50	Hard	(Germany) Gina Marie Dittmann	(United States) Mia Horvit (Japan) Michika Ozeki	6–4, 1–6, [10–5]
