= Carlota Martínez Círez =

Spanish tennis player (born 2001)

- Country (sports): Spain
- Born: 13 February 2001 (age 25)
- Plays: Right-handed
- Prize money: $295,402

Singles
- Career record: 256–182
- Career titles: 7 ITF
- Highest ranking: No. 203 (24 July 2023)
- Current ranking: No. 379 (25 May 2026)

Grand Slam singles results
- Australian Open: Q1 (2024)
- Wimbledon: Q1 (2025)
- US Open: Q1 (2023, 2025)

Doubles
- Career record: 17–17
- Highest ranking: No. 794 (20 March 2023)
- Last updated on: 4 June 2026.

Carlota Martínez Círez (born 13 February 2001) is a Spanish tennis player. She has a career-high ranking of world No. 203, achieved on 24 July 2023.

== Early life ==
From Sádaba, in the province of Zaragoza, Aragon, she started playing tennis relatively late at ten years-old. She won her first title on the ITF Junior Circuit in Luxembourg in 2017. She reached the top 50 in the world junior rankings and played in all four junior Grand Slam tournaments and started competing on the ITF Circuit at the age of 19. Around that time, she began training at Reial Club de Tennis Barcelona-1899 with José María Arenas and Jesús Sánchez.

== Career ==
In March 2022, Martínez Círez won her first professional title in Marrakesh, defeating German player Chantal Sauvant 6–2, 6–0, in the final.

In July 2023, she won the Punta Cana tennis tournament in the Dominican Republic, defeating Ekaterina Makarova. She subsequently entered qualification for a major for the first time at the US Open. She was beaten by home player Ann Li in the first round of qualifying.

In January 2024, Martínez Círez played in the qualifying rounds for the Australian Open, where she lost to Polina Kudermetova. She reached quarterfinals of the Zaragoza Open on the 2024 ITF Women's World Tennis Tour. In April, in qualifying for the Madrid Open, she played Hungarian Anna Bondár and won in straight sets.

Martínez Círez was awarded a wildcard into the 2025 Madrid Open for her first WTA 1000 main-draw match, losing to qualifier and fellow debutant Maya Joint in the first round, in three sets. Martínez Círez also received a main-draw wildcard for the 2026 Madrid Open but lost again in round one.

== ITF Circuit finals ==
=== Singles: 14 (7 titles, 7 runner-ups) ===
Legend W25/35 tournaments (6–7) W15 tournaments (1–0)	Finals by surface Hard (0–1) Clay (7–6)

Result	W–L	Date	Tournament	Tier	Surface	Opponent	Score
Win	1–0	Mar 2022	ITF Marrakesh, Morocco	W15	Clay	(Germany) Chantal Sauvant	6–2, 6–0
Loss	1–1	Sep 2022	ITF Marbella, Spain	W25	Clay	(Spain) Leyre Romero Gormaz	7–6^{(2)}, 2–6, 0–6
Win	2–1	Oct 2022	ITF Santa Margharita di Pula, Italy	W25	Clay	(Japan) Misaki Matsuda	7–5, 7–5
Win	3–1	Jan 2023	ITF Buenos Aires, Argentina	W25	Clay	(Italy) Nuria Brancaccio	6–4, 5–7, 6–3
Loss	3–2	May 2023	ITF Platja d'Aro, Spain	W25	Clay	(Brazil) Carolina Alves	1–6, 7–6^{(1)}, 4–6
Win	4–2	Jul 2023	ITF Punta Cana, Dominican Rep.	W25	Clay	(Russia) Ekaterina Makarova	6–3, 6–3
Loss	4–3	Jul 2024	ITF Casablanca, Morocco	W35	Clay	(Spain) Andrea Lázaro García	6–7^{(2)}, 3–6
Loss	4–4	Aug 2024	ITF Cluj-Napoca, Romania	W35	Clay	(Romania) Georgia Andreea Crăciun	1–6, 2–6
Win	5–4	Sep 2024	ITF Trieste, Italy	W35	Clay	(Italy) Anastasia Abbagnato	7–6^{(2)}, 6–4
Win	6–4	Sep 2024	ITF Reus, Spain	W35	Clay	(France) Alice Ramé	6–1, 7–6^{(4)}
Win	7–4	Oct 2024	ITF Santa Margharita di Pula, Italy	W35	Clay	(Italy) Nicole Fossa Huergo	6–4, 6–3
Loss	7–5	Dec 2024	ITF Santo Domingo, Dominican Rep.	W35	Hard	(United States) Olivia Lincer	6–7^{(9)}, 6–3, 3–6
Loss	7–6	Jan 2026	ITF Antalya, Turkey	W35	Clay	(Romania) Andreea Prisăcariu	6–2, 6–7^{(6)}, 6–7^{(3)}
Loss	7–7	Jan 2026	ITF Buenos Aires, Argentina	W35	Clay	(Brazil) Carolina Alves	0–6, 2–6

=== Doubles: 1 (runner-up) ===
Legend W15 tournaments	Finals by surface Clay (0–1)

Result	Date	Tournament	Tier	Surface	Partner	Opponent	Score
Loss	Dec 2021	ITF Antalya, Turkey	W15	Clay	(Spain) Claudia Hoste Ferrer	(Russia) Ksenia Laskutova (Hungary) Amarissa Tóth	0–6, 5–7
