= 2025 Edmond Open – Singles =

Singles
- 2025 Edmond Open

Final
- Champion: (United States) Elizabeth Mandlik
- Runner-up: (Canada) Marina Stakusic
- Score: 6–3, 7–5

Events
Singles	Doubles
← 2024 ·	Edmond Open	· 2026 →

Mary Stoiana was the defending champion, but lost in the second round to Marina Stakusic.

Elizabeth Mandlik won the title, defeating Stakusic 6–3, 7–5 in the final.

== Seeds ==
1. (Mexico) Renata Zarazúa (quarterfinals)
2. (Croatia) Petra Marčinko (first round)
3. (Canada) Marina Stakusic (final)
4. (United States) Louisa Chirico (first round)
5. Iryna Shymanovich (semifinals)
6. (Canada) Cadence Brace (semifinals)
7. Anastasia Gasanova (first round)
8. (Slovakia) Viktória Hrunčáková (second round)

== Draw ==
=== Key ===
- Q = Qualifier
- WC = Wild card
- LL = Lucky loser
- Alt = Alternate
- ITF = ITF entry
- PR = Protected ranking
- SR = Special ranking
- SE = Special exempt
- JE = Junior exempt
- JR = Junior Accelerator Programme entrant
- CO = College Accelerator Programme entrant
- NG = Next Gen Accelerator Program entrant
- w/o = Walkover
- r = Retired
- d = Defaulted

=== Finals ===
Semifinals
5	Iryna Shymanovich	1	2
3	(Canada) Marina Stakusic	6	6
6	(Canada) Cadence Brace	3	2
(United States) Elizabeth Mandlik	6	6

Final
3	(Canada) Marina Stakusic	3	5
(United States) Elizabeth Mandlik	6	7

=== Top half ===
First round
1	(Mexico) R Zarazúa	6	6
Q	(United States) D Hewitt	1	3
Q	(United States) A Markham	1	3
SR	(United States) K Day	6	6
(United States) A Akli	3	6	6
(United States) H Chang	6	2	2
(Romania) G Lee	1	3
5	I Shymanovich	6	6
3	(Canada) M Stakusic	6	6
(United States) A Rogers	2	2
Q	E Laskevich	3	3
WC	(United States) M Stoiana	6	6
(Canada) K Cross	6	4	4
Q	(Venezuela) SE Cabezas Domínguez	1	6	6
WC	(United States) M Brengle	6	7^{7}
7	A Gasanova	4	6^{4}

Second round
1	(Mexico) R Zarazúa	3	6	6
SR	(United States) K Day	6	3	2
(United States) A Akli	4	1
5	I Shymanovich	6	6
3	(Canada) M Stakusic	6	6
WC	(United States) M Stoiana	2	2
Q	(Venezuela) SE Cabezas Domínguez	0	1
WC	(United States) M Brengle	6	6

Quarterfinals
1	(Mexico) R Zarazúa	6	4	5
5	I Shymanovich	3	6	7
3	(Canada) M Stakusic	6	6
WC	(United States) M Brengle	2	0

Semifinals
5	I Shymanovich	1	2
3	(Canada) M Stakusic	6	6

=== Bottom half ===
First round
6	(Canada) C Brace	6	6
WC	(United States) Z Hammond	0	1
Q	(Italy) D Cherubini	5	2
Q	(Peru) D Guzmán	7	6
(Canada) K Sebov	6	6
LL	A Tikhonova	2	3
WC	(United States) M Rapolu	7	6
4	(United States) L Chirico	5	2
8	(Slovakia) V Hrunčáková	4	6	6
(United States) E Kalieva	6	4	3
Q	(Australia) O Gadecki	6	6
(France) T Andrianjafitrimo	2	2
(United States) E Mandlik	7^{7}	4	6
(United States) F Crawley	6^{1}	6	2
Q	(United States) J Pareja	2	6	6
2	(Croatia) P Marčinko	6	2	4

Second round
6	(Canada) C Brace	6	6
Q	(Peru) D Guzmán	2	2
(Canada) K Sebov	6	6
WC	(United States) M Rapolu	2	3
8	(Slovakia) V Hrunčáková	2	1
Q	(Australia) O Gadecki	6	6
(United States) E Mandlik	6	6
Q	(United States) J Pareja	3	2

Quarterfinals
6	(Canada) C Brace	6	6
(Canada) K Sebov	2	4
Q	(Australia) O Gadecki	1	3
(United States) E Mandlik	6	6

Semifinals
6	(Canada) C Brace	3	2
(United States) E Mandlik	6	6
