= 2025 Hall of Fame Open =

- Date: July 7–13
- Edition: 49th (men); 1st (women)
- Category: ATP Challenger Tour 125 (men); WTA 125 (women)
- Prize money: $200,000
- Surface: Grass / outdoor
- Location: Newport, Rhode Island, United States
- Venue: International Tennis Hall of Fame

Champions

Men's singles
- (United States) Zachary Svajda

Women's singles
- (United States) Caty McNally

Men's doubles
- (United States) Robert Cash / (United States) JJ Tracy

Women's doubles
- (United States) Carmen Corley / (United States) Ivana Corley
- Hall of Fame Open

The 2025 Hall of Fame Open was a combined men's and women's professional tennis tournament played on outdoor grass courts. It was the 49th edition of the men's event and the first edition of the women's event. The tournament was classified as an ATP Challenger Tour 125 event on the 2025 ATP Challenger Tour (downgraded from ATP 250 status in previous years), and a 2025 WTA 125 tournament. It took place at the International Tennis Hall of Fame in Newport, Rhode Island, United States, from July 7 through July 13, 2025.

== ATP singles main-draw entrants ==
=== Seeds ===
Country	Player	Rank^{1}	Seed
USA	Brandon Holt	99	1
AUS	James Duckworth	103	2
AUS	Tristan Schoolkate	104	3
FRA	Adrian Mannarino	123	4
USA	Eliot Spizzirri	128	5
USA	Christopher Eubanks	130	6
USA	Mitchell Krueger	164	7
JPN	Yosuke Watanuki	177	8

- ^{1} Rankings are as of 30 June 2025.

=== Other entrants ===
The following players received wildcards into the main draw:

- (United States) Daniel Milavsky
- (United States) Michael Zheng
- (United States) Evan Zhu

The following players received entry into the singles main draw as alternates:

- (United States) Stefan Kozlov
- (Canada) Dan Martin
- (United States) Karl Poling

The following players received entry from the qualifying draw:

- (United States) Alafia Ayeni
- (France) Antoine Ghibaudo
- (United States) Trey Hilderbrand
- (United States) Tristan McCormick
- (United States) Quinn Vandecasteele
- (United Kingdom) Oscar Weightman

The following player received entry as a lucky loser:

- (New Zealand) James Watt

== WTA singles main draw entrants ==
=== Seeds ===
Country	Player	Rank^{1}	Seed
GER	Tatjana Maria	45	1
JPN	Ena Shibahara	120	2
AUS	Talia Gibson	126	3
CZE	Linda Fruhvirtová	148	4
AUS	Destanee Aiava	160	5
ITA	Lucrezia Stefanini	161	6
NED	Arianne Hartono	184	7
GEO	Mariam Bolkvadze	198	8

- ^{1} Rankings are as of 30 June 2025.

=== Other entrants ===
The following players received wildcards into the main draw:

- (Canada) Eugenie Bouchard
- (United States) Lea Ma
- (United States) Christina McHale
- (Italy) Lucrezia Stefanini

The following players received entry from the qualifying draw:

- (United States) Haley Giavara
- (Australia) Petra Hule
- (Poland) Olivia Lincer
- (United States) Alana Smith

=== Withdrawals ===
Before the tournament

- (United States) Hailey Baptiste → replaced by (United States) Ayana Akli
- (Australia) Lizette Cabrera → replaced by (Canada) Katherine Sebov
- (United Kingdom) Harriet Dart → replaced by (United States) Elvina Kalieva
- (United States) Lauren Davis → replaced by (Canada) Kayla Cross
- (Australia) Maddison Inglis → replaced by (United States) Caty McNally
- (United States) Iva Jovic → replaced by (United States) Maria Mateas
- (United States) Robin Montgomery → replaced by (Czech Republic) Darja Viďmanová
- (United States) Whitney Osuigwe → replaced by (United States) Anna Rogers
- (Czech Republic) Barbora Palicová → replaced by (Switzerland) Leonie Küng
- (United States) Alycia Parks → replaced by (United States) Emina Bektas
- (Thailand) Mananchaya Sawangkaew → replaced by (Japan) Sayaka Ishii
- (Argentina) Solana Sierra → replaced by (China) Ma Yexin
- (Canada) Marina Stakusic → replaced by (United States) Hanna Chang
- (United States) Katie Volynets → replaced by (United States) Elizabeth Mandlik
- (United Kingdom) Heather Watson → replaced by (United Kingdom) Lily Miyazaki
- (China) Yuan Yue → replaced by (India) Sahaja Yamalapalli
- (China) Zhang Shuai → replaced by (Canada) Carol Zhao

== WTA doubles main draw entrants ==
=== Seeds ===
Country	Player	Country	Player	Rank	Seed
CAN	Ariana Arseneault	CAN	Mia Kupres	307	1
USA	Makenna Jones	USA	Anna Rogers	320	2
NED	Arianne Hartono	IND	Prarthana Thombare	344	3
USA	Carmen Corley	USA	Ivana Corley	353	4

- Rankings are as of 30 June 2025.

=== Other entrants ===
The following pair received a wildcard into the doubles main draw:

- (Canada) Eugenie Bouchard / (Poland) Olivia Lincer

== Champions ==
=== Men's singles ===
- (United States) Zachary Svajda def. (France) Adrian Mannarino 7–5, 6–3.

=== Women's singles ===
- (United States) Caty McNally def. (Germany) Tatjana Maria, 2–6, 6–4, 6–2

=== Men's doubles ===
- (United States) Robert Cash / (United States) JJ Tracy def. (Mexico) Hans Hach Verdugo / (Colombia) Cristian Rodríguez 7–6^{(7–3)}, 6–3.

=== Women's doubles ===
- (United States) Carmen Corley / (United States) Ivana Corley def. (Netherlands) Arianne Hartono / (India) Prarthana Thombare, 7–6^{(7–4)}, 6–3
