= 2025 Edmond Open =

Tennis tournament

- Date: 6–12 October 2025
- Edition: 2nd
- Category: ITF Women's World Tennis Tour
- Prize money: $100,000
- Surface: Hard / Outdoor
- Location: Edmond, Oklahoma, United States

2024 Champions

Singles
- (United States) Mary Stoiana

Champions

Doubles
- (Ukraine) Valeriya Strakhova / Anastasia Tikhonova
← 2024 ·	Edmond Open	· 2026 →

The 2025 Edmond Open is a professional tennis tournament played on outdoor hard courts. It is the second edition of the tournament, which is part of the 2025 ITF Women's World Tennis Tour. It takes place in Edmond, Oklahoma, United States, between 6 and 12 October 2025.

== Champions ==
=== Singles ===
- (United States) Elizabeth Mandlik def. (Canada) Marina Stakusic, 6–3, 7–5

=== Doubles ===
- (Ukraine) Valeriya Strakhova / Anastasia Tikhonova def. (Australia) Olivia Gadecki / (Poland) Olivia Lincer, 6–3, 6–7^{(2–7)}, [10–8]

== Singles main draw entrants ==
=== Seeds ===
Country	Player	Rank	Seed
MEX	Renata Zarazúa	74	1
CRO	Petra Marčinko	123	2
CAN	Marina Stakusic	151	3
USA	Louisa Chirico	154	4
	Iryna Shymanovich	166	5
CAN	Cadence Brace	205	6
	Anastasia Gasanova	206	7
SVK	Viktória Hrunčáková	229	8

- Rankings are as of 22 September 2025.

=== Other entrants ===
The following players received wildcards into the singles main draw:

- (United States) Madison Brengle
- (United States) Zoe Hammond
- (United States) Malaika Rapolu
- (United States) Mary Stoiana

The following player received entry into the singles main draw using a special ranking:

- (United States) Kayla Day

The following players received entry from the qualifying draw:

- (Venezuela) Sofía Elena Cabezas Domínguez
- (Italy) Diletta Cherubini
- (Australia) Olivia Gadecki
- (Peru) Dana Guzmán
- (United States) Dalayna Hewitt
- Evialina Laskevich
- (United States) Ava Markham
- (United States) Julieta Pareja

The following player received entry as a lucky loser:

- Anastasia Tikhonova
