= 2023 LTP Charleston Pro Tennis =

Tennis tournament

- Date: 17–23 April 2023
- Edition: 14th
- Category: ITF Women's World Tennis Tour
- Prize money: $100,000
- Surface: Clay / Outdoor
- Location: Charleston, United States

Champions

Singles
- (United States) Emma Navarro

Doubles
- (United States) Sophie Chang / (United States) Angela Kulikov
← 2022 ·	LTP Charleston Pro Tennis	· 2024 →

The 2023 LTP Charleston Pro Tennis was a professional tennis tournament played on outdoor clay courts. It was the fourteenth edition of the tournament, which was part of the 2023 ITF Women's World Tennis Tour. It took place in Charleston, United States, between 17 and 23 April 2023.

== Champions ==
=== Singles ===
- (United States) Emma Navarro def. (United States) Peyton Stearns, 2–6, 6–2, 7–5

=== Doubles ===
- (United States) Sophie Chang / (United States) Angela Kulikov def. (United States) Ashlyn Krueger / (United States) Robin Montgomery, 6–3, 6–4

== Singles main draw entrants ==
=== Seeds ===
Country	Player	Rank	Seed
USA	Peyton Stearns	89	1
USA	Madison Brengle	90	2
USA	Emma Navarro	120	3
JPN	Nao Hibino	122	4
CHN	Yuan Yue	123	5
USA	Elizabeth Mandlik	145	6
USA	Caroline Dolehide	152	7
USA	Ashlyn Krueger	157	8

- Rankings are as of 10 April 2023.

=== Other entrants ===
The following players received wildcards into the singles main draw:

- (United States) Sophie Chang
- (United States) Elvina Kalieva
- (United States) Maria Mateas
- (United States) Whitney Osuigwe

The following players received entry from the qualifying draw:

- (United States) Chloe Beck
- (Canada) Cadence Brace
- (United States) Liv Hovde
- (Australia) Storm Hunter
- (Chinese Taipei) Liang En-shuo
- (United States) Grace Min
- (United States) Taylor Ng
- (Mexico) Renata Zarazúa
