= 2018 LTP Charleston Pro Tennis =

- Date: 30 April–6 May
- Edition: 2nd
- Category: ITF Women's Circuit
- Prize money: $80,000
- Surface: Clay
- Location: Charleston, United States

Champions

Singles
- (United States) Taylor Townsend

Doubles
- (Chile) Alexa Guarachi / (New Zealand) Erin Routliffe
← 2017 ·	LTP Charleston Pro Tennis	· 2019 →

The 2018 LTP Charleston Pro Tennis was a professional tennis tournament played on outdoor clay courts. It was the second edition of the tournament and was part of the 2018 ITF Women's Circuit. It took place in Charleston, United States, on 30 April–6 May 2018.

== Singles main draw entrants ==
=== Seeds ===
Country	Player	Rank^{1}	Seed
USA	Madison Brengle	80	1
USA	Taylor Townsend	91	2
COL	Mariana Duque Mariño	112	3
USA	Nicole Gibbs	119	4
USA	Kristie Ahn	127	5
UKR	Anhelina Kalinina	151	6
USA	Jamie Loeb	163	7
USA	Irina Falconi	167	8

- ^{1} Rankings as of 23 April 2018.

=== Other entrants ===
The following players received a wildcard into the singles main draw:

- (United States) Quinn Gleason
- (United States) Maria Mateas
- (United States) Emma Navarro
- (United States) Jessica Pegula

The following player received entry using a protected ranking:

- (United States) Allie Kiick

The following player received entry using a junior exempt:

- (United States) Whitney Osuigwe

The following players received entry from the qualifying draw:

- (Brazil) Paula Cristina Gonçalves
- (Italy) Camilla Rosatello
- (United States) Katerina Stewart
- (Poland) Iga Świątek

== Champions ==
=== Singles ===
- (United States) Taylor Townsend def. (United States) Madison Brengle, 6–0, 6–4

=== Doubles ===
- (Chile) Alexa Guarachi / (New Zealand) Erin Routliffe def. (United States) Louisa Chirico / (United States) Allie Kiick, 6–1, 3–6, [10–5]
