= 2022 LTP Charleston Pro Tennis – Singles =

Singles
- 2022 LTP Charleston Pro Tennis

Final
- Champion: (United States) Taylor Townsend
- Runner-up: (China) Wang Xiyu
- Score: 6–3, 6–2

Events
Singles	Doubles
← 2021 ·	LTP Charleston Pro Tennis	· 2023 →

Claire Liu was the defending champion but chose not to participate.

Taylor Townsend won the title, defeating Wang Xiyu in the final, 6–3, 6–2.

== Seeds ==
1. (Romania) Irina Bara (quarterfinals)
2. (Germany) Tatjana Maria (second round)
3. (United States) Katie Volynets (quarterfinals)
4. (United States) Hailey Baptiste (second round)
5. (China) Wang Xiyu (final)
6. (United States) CoCo Vandeweghe (first round)
7. (Italy) Lucrezia Stefanini (first round)
8. (Poland) Katarzyna Kawa (first round)

== Draw ==
=== Key ===
- Q = Qualifier
- WC = Wild card
- LL = Lucky loser
- Alt = Alternate
- ITF = ITF entry
- PR = Protected ranking
- SR = Special ranking
- SE = Special exempt
- JE = Junior exempt
- JR = Junior Accelerator Programme entrant
- CO = College Accelerator Programme entrant
- NG = Next Gen Accelerator Program entrant
- w/o = Walkover
- r = Retired
- d = Defaulted

=== Finals ===
Semifinals
5	(China) Wang Xiyu	6	5	7^{7}
Q	(Brazil) Gabriela Cé	4	7	6^{4}
WC	(United States) Taylor Townsend	6	6
Q	(United States) Whitney Osuigwe	3	1

Final
5	(China) Wang Xiyu	3	2
WC	(United States) Taylor Townsend	6	6

=== Top half ===
First round
1	(Romania) I Bara	7	7^{8}
Q	(United States) C Harrison	5	6^{6}
(Romania) A Cadanțu-Ignatik	4	1
(United States) E Navarro	6	6
(United States) C Dolehide	7	7
(United States) A Parks	5	5
WC	(Mexico) M Zacarías	6	2	2
5	(China) Xiy Wang	3	6	6
4/WC	(United States) H Baptiste	6	1	7
(United States) G Min	3	6	5
Q	(Brazil) G Cé	6	7
Q	(Lithuania) A Paražinskaitė	3	5
(United States) E Bektas	3	5
(United States) J Loeb	6	7
Q	(United States) A Graham	6	6^{6}	6
8	(Poland) K Kawa	4	7^{8}	4

Second round
1	(Romania) I Bara	6	6
(United States) E Navarro	2	1
(United States) C Dolehide	6	4	1
5	(China) Xiy Wang	3	6	6
4/WC	(United States) H Baptiste	6	4	4
Q	(Brazil) G Cé	4	6	6
(United States) J Loeb	1	4
Q	(United States) A Graham	6	6

Quarterfinals
1	(Romania) I Bara	4	6	1
5	(China) Xiy Wang	6	4	6
Q	(Brazil) G Cé	6	6
Q	(United States) A Graham	0	2

Semifinals
5	(China) Xiy Wang	6	5	7^{7}
Q	(Brazil) G Cé	4	7	6^{4}

=== Bottom half ===
First round
7	(Italy) L Stefanini	3	2
SE	(United States) L Chirico	6	6
Q	(Canada) F Abanda	6	1	0
WC	(United States) T Townsend	1	6	6
(Mexico) R Zarazúa	6	6
Q	(United States) E Halbauer	4	4
Q	(United States) C Van Nguyen	2	3
3	(United States) K Volynets	6	6
6	(United States) C Vandeweghe	6^{5}	1
(Japan) N Hibino	7^{7}	6
WC	(United States) S Chang	6	6
(United States) F Di Lorenzo	2	2
Q	(United States) W Osuigwe	6	6
(United States) R Anderson	2	1
O Govortsova	2	2
2	(Germany) T Maria	6	6

Second round
SE	(United States) L Chirico	3	3
WC	(United States) T Townsend	6	6
(Mexico) R Zarazúa	1	0
3	(United States) K Volynets	6	6
(Japan) N Hibino	6	6
WC	(United States) S Chang	2	2
Q	(United States) W Osuigwe	7^{7}	4	6
2	(Germany) T Maria	6^{4}	6	2

Quarterfinals
WC	(United States) T Townsend	1	6	6
3	(United States) K Volynets	6	4	2
(Japan) N Hibino	6	5	3
Q	(United States) W Osuigwe	4	7	6

Semifinals
WC	(United States) T Townsend	6	6
Q	(United States) W Osuigwe	3	1
