= 2025 Edmond Open – Doubles =

Doubles
- 2025 Edmond Open

Final
- Champions: (Ukraine) Valeriya Strakhova; Anastasia Tikhonova
- Runners-up: (Australia) Olivia Gadecki (Poland) Olivia Lincer
- Score: 6–3, 6–7^{(2–7)}, [10–8]

Events
Singles	Doubles
← 2024 ·	Edmond Open	· 2026 →

Kayla Day and Jaimee Fourlis were the defending champions but chose not to participate.

Valeriya Strakhova and Anastasia Tikhonova won the title, after defeating Olivia Gadecki and Olivia Lincer 6–3, 6–7^{(2–7)}, [10–8] in the final.

== Seeds ==
1. Maria Kozyreva / Iryna Shymanovich (first round)
2. (Canada) Kayla Cross / (Mexico) Renata Zarazúa (first round)
3. (United States) Carmen Corley / (United States) Ivana Corley (quarterfinals)
4. (Ukraine) Valeriya Strakhova / Anastasia Tikhonova (champions)

== Draw ==
=== Key ===
- Q = Qualifier
- WC = Wild card
- LL = Lucky loser
- Alt = Alternate
- ITF = ITF entry
- PR = Protected ranking
- SR = Special ranking
- SE = Special exempt
- JE = Junior exempt
- JR = Junior Accelerator Programme entrant
- CO = College Accelerator Programme entrant
- NG = Next Gen Accelerator Program entrant
- w/o = Walkover
- r = Retired
- d = Defaulted

First round
1	M Kozyreva; I Shymanovich	6^{5}	4
(Australia) A Osborne (United States) A Rencheli	7^{7}	6
WC	(Spain) M Berlanga Bandera (Mexico) J García	2	6	[5]
(United States) F Crawley (Slovenia) K Novak	6	3	[10]
4	(Ukraine) V Strakhova; A Tikhonova	6	2	[10]
(Slovakia) V Hrunčáková (Slovakia) M Okáľová	4	6	[2]
A Gasanova; Y Hatouka	4	7^{7}	[6]
(United States) M Lewis (Canada) K Sebov	6	6^{3}	[10]
(United States) A Akli (United States) E Cayetano	6^{2}	3
(Australia) O Gadecki (Poland) O Lincer	7^{7}	6
(United States) A Lahey (Romania) G Lee	5	6	[6]
3	(United States) C Corley (United States) I Corley	7	1	[10]
(United States) D Hewitt (United States) A Rogers	7^{7}	6
(United States) E Kalieva (United States) A Smith	6^{4}	4
WC	(United States) G Epps (United States) Z Epps	7	6
2	(Canada) K Cross (Mexico) R Zarazúa	5	4

Quarterfinals
(Australia) A Osborne (United States) A Rencheli	6	6
(United States) F Crawley (Slovenia) K Novak	3	3
4	(Ukraine) V Strakhova; A Tikhonova	3	6	[10]
(United States) M Lewis (Canada) K Sebov	6	4	[5]
(Australia) O Gadecki (Poland) O Lincer	6	6
3	(United States) C Corley (United States) I Corley	1	4
(United States) D Hewitt (United States) A Rogers	6	6
WC	(United States) G Epps (United States) Z Epps	3	4

Semifinals
(Australia) A Osborne (United States) A Rencheli	4	5
4	(Ukraine) V Strakhova; A Tikhonova	6	7
(Australia) O Gadecki (Poland) O Lincer	6	6
(United States) D Hewitt (United States) A Rogers	2	3

Final
4	(Ukraine) V Strakhova; A Tikhonova	6	6^{2}	[10]
(Australia) O Gadecki (Poland) O Lincer	3	7^{7}	[8]
