= 2021 LTP Charleston Pro Tennis =

Tennis tournament

- Date: 3–9 May 2021
- Edition: 5th
- Category: ITF Women's World Tennis Tour
- Prize money: $100,000
- Surface: Clay
- Location: Charleston, South Carolina, United States

Champions

Singles
- (United States) Claire Liu

Doubles
- (United States) Caty McNally / (Australia) Storm Sanders
← 2020 ·	LTP Charleston Pro Tennis	· 2022 →

The 2021 LTP Charleston Pro Tennis was a professional women's tennis tournament played on outdoor clay courts. It was the fifth edition of the tournament which is part of the 2021 ITF Women's World Tennis Tour. It took place in Charleston, South Carolina, United States between 3 and 9 May 2021.

== Singles main-draw entrants ==
=== Seeds ===
Country	Player	Rank^{1}	Seed
USA	Madison Brengle	86	1
USA	Caty McNally	110	2
EGY	Mayar Sherif	123	3
USA	Kristie Ahn	124	4
ROU	Irina Bara	133	5
MEX	Renata Zarazúa	141	6
BLR	Olga Govortsova	142	7
CHN	Wang Xinyu	145	8

- ^{1} Rankings are as of 26 April 2021.

=== Other entrants ===
The following players received wildcards into the singles main draw:

- (United States) Caty McNally
- (United States) Alycia Parks
- (United States) Kennedy Shaffer
- (United States) Katie Volynets

The following player received entry as a special exempt:

- (United States) Claire Liu

The following players received entry from the qualifying draw:

- (Russia) Amina Anshba
- (United States) Victoria Duval
- (Netherlands) Arianne Hartono
- (Japan) Eri Hozumi
- (Serbia) Aleksandra Krunić
- (United States) Jamie Loeb
- (Poland) Urszula Radwańska
- (Indonesia) Aldila Sutjiadi

== Champions ==
=== Singles ===
- (United States) Claire Liu def. (United States) Madison Brengle, 6–2, 7–6^{(8–6)}

=== Doubles ===
- (United States) Caty McNally / (Australia) Storm Sanders def. (Japan) Eri Hozumi / (Japan) Miyu Kato 7–5, 4–6, [10–6]
