= 2020 LTP Charleston Pro Tennis =

Tennis tournament

- Date: 2–8 November 2020
- Edition: 4th
- Category: ITF Women's World Tennis Tour
- Prize money: $100,000
- Surface: Clay
- Location: Charleston, United States

Champions

Singles
- (Egypt) Mayar Sherif

Doubles
- (Poland) Magdalena Fręch / (Poland) Katarzyna Kawa
← 2019 ·	LTP Charleston Pro Tennis	· 2021 →

The 2020 LTP Charleston Pro Tennis was a professional tennis tournament played on outdoor clay courts. It was the fourth edition of the tournament which was part of the 2020 ITF Women's World Tennis Tour. It took place in Charleston, South Carolina, United States between 2 and 8 November 2020.

== Singles main-draw entrants ==
=== Seeds ===
Country	Player	Rank^{1}	Seed
USA	Shelby Rogers	58	1
USA	Lauren Davis	73	2
USA	Madison Brengle	81	3
JPN	Misaki Doi	85	4
ESP	Aliona Bolsova	101	5
USA	Kristie Ahn	106	6
GER	Anna-Lena Friedsam	108	7
USA	Ann Li	112	8

- ^{1} Rankings are as of 26 October 2020.

=== Other entrants ===
The following players received wildcards into the singles main draw:

- (United States) Catherine Bellis
- (United States) Robin Montgomery
- (United States) Emma Navarro
- (United States) Kennedy Shaffer

The following player received entry as a junior exempt:

- (France) Diane Parry

The following players received entry from the qualifying draw:

- (United States) Hailey Baptiste
- (Ukraine) Kateryna Bondarenko
- (Poland) Magdalena Fręch
- (United States) Claire Liu
- (United States) Bethanie Mattek-Sands
- (Japan) Kyōka Okamura
- (Egypt) Mayar Sherif
- (Romania) Gabriela Talabă

== Champions ==
=== Singles ===
- (Egypt) Mayar Sherif def. (Poland) Katarzyna Kawa, 6–2, 6–3

=== Doubles ===
- (Poland) Magdalena Fręch / (Poland) Katarzyna Kawa def. (Australia) Astra Sharma / (Egypt) Mayar Sherif, 4–6, 6–4, [10–2]
