= 2022 LTP Charleston Pro Tennis =

Tennis tournament

- Date: 25 April–1 May 2022
- Edition: 13th
- Category: ITF Women's World Tennis Tour
- Prize money: $100,000
- Surface: Clay / Outdoor
- Location: Charleston, South Carolina, United States

Champions

Singles
- (United States) Taylor Townsend

Doubles
- (Poland) Katarzyna Kawa / (Indonesia) Aldila Sutjiadi
← 2021 ·	LTP Charleston Pro Tennis	· 2023 →

The 2022 LTP Charleston Pro Tennis was a professional tennis tournament played on outdoor clay courts. It was the thirteenth edition of the tournament which was part of the 2022 ITF Women's World Tennis Tour. It took place in Charleston, South Carolina, United States between 25 April and 1 May 2022.

== Singles main draw entrants ==
=== Seeds ===
Country	Player	Rank^{1}	Seed
ROU	Irina Bara	104	1
GER	Tatjana Maria	113	2
USA	Katie Volynets	119	3
USA	Hailey Baptiste	125	4
CHN	Wang Xiyu	127	5
USA	CoCo Vandeweghe	130	6
ITA	Lucrezia Stefanini	153	7
POL	Katarzyna Kawa	154	8

- ^{1} Rankings are as of 18 April 2022.

=== Other entrants ===
The following players received wildcards into the singles main draw:

- (United States) Hailey Baptiste
- (United States) Sophie Chang
- (United States) Taylor Townsend
- (Mexico) Marcela Zacarías

The following player received entry as a special exempt:

- (United States) Louisa Chirico

The following players received entry from the qualifying draw:

- (Canada) Françoise Abanda
- (Brazil) Gabriela Cé
- (United States) Alexa Graham
- (United States) Elizabeth Halbauer
- (United States) Catherine Harrison
- (United States) Whitney Osuigwe
- (Lithuania) Akvilė Paražinskaitė
- (United States) Chanelle Van Nguyen

== Champions ==
=== Singles ===
- (United States) Taylor Townsend def. (China) Wang Xiyu, 6–3, 6–2

=== Doubles ===
- (Poland) Katarzyna Kawa / (Indonesia) Aldila Sutjiadi def. (United States) Sophie Chang / (United States) Angela Kulikov, 6–1, 6–4
