= 2025 Hall of Fame Open – Women's doubles =

Women's doubles
- 2025 Hall of Fame Open

Final
- Champions: (United States) Carmen Corley (United States) Ivana Corley
- Runners-up: (Netherlands) Arianne Hartono (India) Prarthana Thombare
- Score: 7–6^{(7–4)}, 6–3

Events
Singles	men	women
Doubles	men	women
Hall of Fame Open	· 2026 →

This was the first edition of the women's event at the Hall of Fame Open and the first women's tennis tournament to be held at the International Tennis Hall of Fame since the defunct Virginia Slims of Newport tournament, last held as a competitive event in 1990.

Carmen and Ivana Corley won the doubles title, defeating Arianne Hartono and Prarthana Thombare in the final, 7–6^{(7–4)}, 6–3.

== Seeds ==
1. (Canada) Ariana Arseneault / (Canada) Mia Kupres (first round)
2. (United States) Makenna Jones / (United States) Anna Rogers (semifinals)
3. (Netherlands) Arianne Hartono / (India) Prarthana Thombare (final)
4. (United States) Carmen Corley / (United States) Ivana Corley (champions)

== Draw ==
=== Key ===
- Q = Qualifier
- WC = Wild card
- LL = Lucky loser
- Alt = Alternate
- ITF = ITF entry
- PR = Protected ranking
- SR = Special ranking
- SE = Special exempt
- JE = Junior exempt
- JR = Junior Accelerator Programme entrant
- CO = College Accelerator Programme entrant
- NG = Next Gen Accelerator Program entrant
- w/o = Walkover
- r = Retired
- d = Defaulted

=== Draw ===
First round
1	(Canada) A Arseneault (Canada) M Kupres	5	4
(Canada) K Cross (United States) M Zamarripa	7	6
(United States) H Giavara (Australia) A Osborne	6	6
(United States) C Harrison (United States) C Rosca	3	4
3	(Netherlands) A Hartono (India) P Thombare	6	6
(Switzerland) L Küng (United States) E Mandlik	3	4
(United States) J Daniel; M Kononova	6	2	[5]
(Australia) P Hule (Romania) G Lee	2	6	[10]
(United States) M Lewis (United States) B Walker	3	6	[11]
(United States) H Chang (United States) C McHale	6	4	[9]
(Australia) D Aiava (Australia) T Gibson	3	2
4	(United States) C Corley (United States) I Corley	6	6
WC	(Canada) E Bouchard (Poland) O Lincer	7	7^{7}
(United States) M Mateas (United States) A Smith	5	6^{2}
(Georgia (country)) M Bolkvadze (United Kingdom) L Miyazaki	1	2
2	(United States) M Jones (United States) A Rogers	6	6

Quarterfinals
(Canada) K Cross (United States) M Zamarripa	6^{3}	6	[10]
(United States) H Giavara (Australia) A Osborne	7^{7}	1	[8]
3	(Netherlands) A Hartono (India) P Thombare	5	6	[10]
(Australia) P Hule (Romania) G Lee	7	3	[7]
(United States) M Lewis (United States) B Walker	4	1
4	(United States) C Corley (United States) I Corley	6	6
WC	(Canada) E Bouchard (Poland) O Lincer	4	4
2	(United States) M Jones (United States) A Rogers	6	6

Semifinals
(Canada) K Cross (United States) M Zamarripa	6	3	[10]
3	(Netherlands) A Hartono (India) P Thombare	4	6	[12]
4	(United States) C Corley (United States) I Corley	4	6	[10]
2	(United States) M Jones (United States) A Rogers	6	1	[7]

Final
3	(Netherlands) A Hartono (India) P Thombare	6^{4}	3
4	(United States) C Corley (United States) I Corley	7^{7}	6
