= 2017 LTP Charleston Pro Tennis =

- Date: 1–7 May
- Edition: 1st
- Category: ITF Women's Circuit
- Prize money: $60,000
- Surface: Clay
- Location: Charleston, United States

Champions

Singles
- (United States) Madison Brengle

Doubles
- (United States) Emina Bektas / (Chile) Alexa Guarachi
LTP Charleston Pro Tennis	· 2018 →

The 2017 LTP Charleston Pro Tennis was a professional tennis tournament played on outdoor clay courts. It was the first edition of the tournament and part of the 2017 ITF Women's Circuit, offering a total of $60,000 in prize money. It took place in Charleston, United States, from 1–7 May 2017.

== Singles main draw entrants ==
=== Seeds ===
Country	Player	Rank^{1}	Seed
USA	Madison Brengle	98	1
BUL	Elitsa Kostova	143	2
USA	Kayla Day	147	3
AUS	Lizette Cabrera	174	4
USA	Sofia Kenin	177	5
CAN	Françoise Abanda	185	6
POR	Michelle Larcher de Brito	226	7
BUL	Sesil Karatantcheva	229	8

- ^{1} Rankings as of 24 April 2017

=== Other entrants ===
The following players received wildcards into the singles main draw:

- (United States) Victoria Duval
- (United States) Claire Liu
- (United States) Emma Navarro
- (United States) Ronit Yurovsky

The following players received entry from the qualifying draw:

- (United States) Emina Bektas
- (United States) Lauren Embree
- (United States) Sabrina Santamaria
- (Canada) Carol Zhao

The following players received entry by a lucky loser:

- (United States) Chanelle Van Nguyen

== Champions ==
=== Singles ===
- (United States) Madison Brengle def. (United States) Danielle Collins, 4–6, 6–2, 6–3

=== Doubles ===
- (United States) Emina Bektas / (Chile) Alexa Guarachi def. (United States) Kaitlyn Christian / (United States) Sabrina Santamaria, 5–7, 6–3, [10–5]
