= 2022 LTP Charleston Pro Tennis – Doubles =

Doubles
- 2022 LTP Charleston Pro Tennis

Final
- Champions: (Poland) Katarzyna Kawa (Indonesia) Aldila Sutjiadi
- Runners-up: (United States) Sophie Chang (United States) Angela Kulikov
- Score: 6–1, 6–4

Events
Singles	Doubles
← 2021 ·	LTP Charleston Pro Tennis	· 2023 →

Caty McNally and Storm Sanders were the defending champions but chose not to participate.

Katarzyna Kawa and Aldila Sutjiadi won the title, defeating Sophie Chang and Angela Kulikov in the final, 6–1, 6–4.

== Seeds ==
1. (Poland) Katarzyna Kawa / (Indonesia) Aldila Sutjiadi (champions)
2. (United States) Emina Bektas / (United Kingdom) Tara Moore (quarterfinals)
3. (United States) Robin Anderson / (United States) Catherine Harrison (quarterfinals, withdrew)
4. (Hungary) Tímea Babos / (Japan) Nao Hibino (semifinals)

== Draw ==
=== Key ===
- Q = Qualifier
- WC = Wild card
- LL = Lucky loser
- Alt = Alternate
- SE = Special exempt
- PR = Protected ranking
- ITF = ITF entry
- JE = Junior exempt
- w/o = Walkover
- r = Retired
- d = Defaulted
- SR = Special ranking

=== Draw ===
First round
1	(Poland) K Kawa (Indonesia) A Sutjiadi	6	6
(United States) A Parks (United States) S Vickery	3	2
(Romania) I Bara (Romania) A Cadanțu-Ignatik	6	6
O Govortsova (United States) C Vandeweghe	3	1
3	(United States) R Anderson (United States) C Harrison	6	6
WC	(United States) A Rogers (United States) C Rosca	3	4
(Australia) O Tjandramulia (Mexico) M Zacarías	6	3	[12]
(Chinese Taipei) C-y Hsu (Romania) G Lee	4	6	[10]
WC	(United States) P Capuano (United States) W Pate	6^{4}	1
(United States) H Baptiste (United States) W Osuigwe	7^{7}	6
WC	(United States) F Di Lorenzo (United States) E Mandlik	4	3
4	(Hungary) T Babos (Japan) N Hibino	6	6
(United States) S Chang (United States) A Kulikov	6	6
(Chinese Taipei) Y-c Hsieh (Mexico) R Zarazúa	3	1
(United States) J Loeb (United States) R McAdoo	2	3
2	(United States) E Bektas (United Kingdom) T Moore	6	6

Quarterfinals
1	(Poland) K Kawa (Indonesia) A Sutjiadi	3	6	[10]
(Romania) I Bara (Romania) A Cadanțu-Ignatik	6	3	[8]
3	(United States) R Anderson (United States) C Harrison
(Australia) O Tjandramulia (Mexico) M Zacarías	w/o
(United States) H Baptiste (United States) W Osuigwe	2	6	[6]
4	(Hungary) T Babos (Japan) N Hibino	6	4	[10]
(United States) S Chang (United States) A Kulikov	6	6
2	(United States) E Bektas (United Kingdom) T Moore	2	2

Semifinals
1	(Poland) K Kawa (Indonesia) A Sutjiadi	6	6
(Australia) O Tjandramulia (Mexico) M Zacarías	1	0
4	(Hungary) T Babos (Japan) N Hibino	5	3
(United States) S Chang (United States) A Kulikov	7	6

Final
1	(Poland) K Kawa (Indonesia) A Sutjiadi	6	6
(United States) S Chang (United States) A Kulikov	1	4
