= 2024 Edmond Open =

Tennis tournament

- Date: 7–13 October 2024
- Edition: 1st
- Category: ITF Women's World Tennis Tour
- Prize money: $60,000
- Surface: Hard / Outdoor
- Location: Edmond, Oklahoma, United States

Champions

Singles
- (United States) Mary Stoiana

Doubles
- (United States) Kayla Day / (Australia) Jaimee Fourlis
Edmond Open	· 2025 →

The 2024 Edmond Open was a professional tennis tournament played on outdoor hard courts. It is the first edition of the tournament, which is part of the 2024 ITF Women's World Tennis Tour. It takes place in Edmond, Oklahoma, United States, between 7 and 13 October 2024.

== Champions ==
=== Singles ===
- (United States) Mary Stoiana def. (United States) Alana Smith, 7–5, 6–3

=== Doubles ===
- (United States) Kayla Day / (Australia) Jaimee Fourlis def. (United States) Sophie Chang / (United States) Rasheeda McAdoo, 7–5, 7–5

== Singles main draw entrants ==
=== Seeds ===
Country	Player	Rank	Seed
ITA	Lucrezia Stefanini	156	1
USA	Kayla Day	170	2
THA	Lanlana Tararudee	179	3
	Anastasia Tikhonova	182	4
USA	Elizabeth Mandlik	185	5
USA	Maria Mateas	210	6
UKR	Valeriya Strakhova	244	7
USA	Sophie Chang	248	8

- Rankings are as of 30 September 2024.

=== Other entrants ===
The following players received wildcards into the singles main draw:

- (United States) Jenna DeFalco
- (United States) Iva Jovic
- (Slovenia) Kristina Novak
- (United States) Mary Stoiana

The following player received entry into the singles main draw using a junior exempt:

- (Ukraine) Anastasiya Lopata

The following players received entry from the qualifying draw:

- (Peru) Dana Guzmán
- (China) Han Jiangxue
- Maria Kononova
- (United States) Rasheeda McAdoo
- (Slovakia) Martina Okáľová
- (Peru) Lucciana Pérez Alarcón
- (United States) Alana Smith
- (Czech Republic) Darja Vidmanová
