= 2025 Hall of Fame Open – Women's singles =

Women's singles
- 2025 Hall of Fame Open

Final
- Champion: (United States) Caty McNally
- Runner-up: (Germany) Tatjana Maria
- Score: 2–6, 6–4, 6–2

Events
Singles	men	women
Doubles	men	women
- Hall of Fame Open

This was the first edition of the women's event at the Hall of Fame Open and the first women's tennis tournament to be held at the International Tennis Hall of Fame since the defunct Virginia Slims of Newport tournament, last held as a competitive event in 1990.

Caty McNally won the women's singles title, defeating Tatjana Maria in the final, 2–6, 6–4, 6–2.

== Seeds ==
1. (Germany) Tatjana Maria (final)
2. (Japan) Ena Shibahara (first round)
3. (Australia) Talia Gibson (quarterfinals)
4. (Czech Republic) Linda Fruhvirtová (first round)
5. (Australia) Destanee Aiava (second round)
6. (Italy) Lucrezia Stefanini (quarterfinals)
7. (Netherlands) Arianne Hartono (second round)
8. (Georgia (country)) Mariam Bolkvadze (second round)

== Draw ==
Key

- Q = Qualifier
- WC = Wild card
- LL = Lucky loser
- Alt = Alternate
- ITF = ITF entry
- PR = Protected ranking
- SR = Special ranking
- SE = Special exempt
- JE = Junior exempt
- JR = Junior Accelerator Programme entrant
- CO = College Accelerator Programme entrant
- NG = Next Gen Accelerator Program entrant
- w/o = Walkover
- r = Retired
- d = Defaulted

=== Finals ===
Semifinals
1	(Germany) Tatjana Maria	6	6
(Canada) Carol Zhao	1	2
(United States) Caty McNally	1	7	6
(United States) Elizabeth Mandlik	6	5	4

Final
1	(Germany) Tatjana Maria	6	4	2
(United States) Caty McNally	2	6	6

=== Top half ===
First round
1	(Germany) T Maria	6	6
(Canada) K Cross	3	3
WC	(United States) C McHale	6	2	1
(United Kingdom) L Miyazaki	3	6	6
(United States) H Chang	1	6	5
(Japan) S Ishii	6	4	7
(United States) E Bektas	7^{7}	3	6^{5}
5	(Australia) D Aiava	6^{4}	6	7^{7}
4	(Czech Republic) L Fruhvirtová	2	4
(United States) E Kalieva	6	6
(Canada) C Zhao	6	6
(China) Y Ma	3	3
Q	(Poland) O Lincer	6	3	2
Q	(United States) A Smith	1	6	6
(United States) M Mateas	3	2
7	(Netherlands) A Hartono	6	6

Second round
1	(Germany) T Maria	6	7
(United Kingdom) L Miyazaki	1	5
(Japan) S Ishii	3	6	6
5	(Australia) D Aiava	6	3	3
(United States) E Kalieva	7^{7}	3	3
(Canada) C Zhao	6^{5}	6	6
Q	(United States) A Smith	4	6	6
7	(Netherlands) A Hartono	6	2	4

Quarterfinals
1	(Germany) T Maria	6	6
(Japan) S Ishii	3	1
(Canada) C Zhao	7	6
Q	(United States) A Smith	5	3

Semifinals
1	(Germany) T Maria	6	6
(Canada) C Zhao	1	2

=== Bottom half ===
First round
8	(Georgia (country)) M Bolkvadze	6	6
(United States) A Akli	4	3
(United States) C McNally	6	6
(Czech Republic) D Viďmanová	0	2
(Canada) K Sebov	2	2
(India) S Yamalapalli	6	6
Q	(Australia) P Hule	4	3
3	(Australia) T Gibson	6	6
6/WC	(Italy) L Stefanini	6	5	6
WC	(United States) L Ma	1	7	0
(United States) A Rogers	7	6
WC	(Canada) E Bouchard	5	2
(United States) E Mandlik	6	6
(Switzerland) L Küng	0	1
Q	(United States) H Giavara	3	7	6
2	(Japan) E Shibahara	6	5	1

Second round
8	(Georgia (country)) M Bolkvadze	0	5
(United States) C McNally	6	7
(India) S Yamalapalli	3	4
3	(Australia) T Gibson	6	6
6/WC	(Italy) L Stefanini	6	7
(United States) A Rogers	2	5
(United States) E Mandlik	6	7
Q	(United States) H Giavara	4	5

Quarterfinals
(United States) C McNally	6	0	6
3	(Australia) T Gibson	3	6	2
6/WC	(Italy) L Stefanini	3	1
(United States) E Mandlik	6	6

Semifinals
(United States) C McNally	1	7	6
(United States) E Mandlik	6	5	4

== Qualifying ==
=== Seeds ===
1. (Romania) Gabriela Lee (qualifying competition)
2. (Australia) Petra Hule (qualified)
3. (United States) Alana Smith (qualified)
4. (Poland) Olivia Lincer (qualified)

=== Qualifiers ===
1. (United States) Haley Giavara
2. (Australia) Petra Hule
3. (United States) Alana Smith
4. (Poland) Olivia Lincer

=== Qualifying draw ===
==== First qualifier ====
Qualifying competition
1	(Romania) Gabriela Lee	5	2
	(United States) Haley Giavara	7	6

==== Second qualifier ====
Qualifying competition
2	(Australia) Petra Hule	6	5	6
	(United States) Makenna Jones	3	7	2

==== Third qualifier ====
Qualifying competition
3	(United States) Alana Smith	3	6	6
WC	(United States) Victoria Hu	6	2	4

==== Fourth qualifier ====
Qualifying competition
4	(Poland) Olivia Lincer	6	6
WC	(United States) Anna Frey	2	3
