= 2019 LTP Charleston Pro Tennis =

- Date: 29 April–5 May 2019
- Edition: 3rd
- Category: ITF Women's World Tennis Tour
- Prize money: $100,000
- Surface: Clay
- Location: Charleston, South Carolina, United States

Champions

Singles
- (United States) Taylor Townsend

Doubles
- (United States) Asia Muhammad / (United States) Taylor Townsend
← 2018 ·	LTP Charleston Pro Tennis	· 2020 →

The 2019 LTP Charleston Pro Tennis was a professional tennis tournament played on outdoor clay courts. It was the third edition of the tournament which was part of the 2019 ITF Women's World Tennis Tour. It took place in Charleston, South Carolina, United States between 29 April and 5 May 2019.

== Singles main-draw entrants ==
=== Seeds ===
Country	Player	Rank^{1}	Seed
USA	Madison Brengle	95	1
USA	Taylor Townsend	101	2
USA	Nicole Gibbs	114	3
UKR	Anhelina Kalinina	133	4
USA	Lauren Davis	134	5
~~USA~~	~~Sachia Vickery~~	~~136~~	~~6~~
SLO	Kaja Juvan	141	7
USA	Allie Kiick	144	8
AUS	Kimberly Birrell	156	9

- ^{1} Rankings are as of 22 April 2019.

=== Other entrants ===
The following players received wildcards into the singles main draw:

- (United States) Ann Li
- (United States) Rasheeda McAdoo
- (United States) Emma Navarro
- (United States) Alycia Parks

The following player received entry using a protected ranking:

- (Czech Republic) Lucie Hradecká

The following players received entry from the qualifying draw:

- (United States) Sophie Chang
- (United States) Louisa Chirico
- (United States) Kayla Day
- (United States) Coco Gauff
- (Israel) Deniz Khazaniuk
- (Japan) Mari Osaka
- (Italy) Gaia Sanesi
- (Australia) Belinda Woolcock

The following player received entry as a lucky loser:

- (Australia) Abbie Myers

== Champions ==
=== Singles ===
- (United States) Taylor Townsend def. (United States) Whitney Osuigwe, 6–4, 6–4

=== Doubles ===
- (United States) Asia Muhammad / (United States) Taylor Townsend def. (United States) Madison Brengle / (United States) Lauren Davis, 6–2, 6–2
