= 2018 LTP Charleston Pro Tennis – Doubles =

Doubles
- 2018 LTP Charleston Pro Tennis

Final
- Champions: (Chile) Alexa Guarachi (New Zealand) Erin Routliffe
- Runners-up: (United States) Louisa Chirico (United States) Allie Kiick
- Score: 6–1, 3–6, [10–5]

Events
Singles	Doubles
← 2017 ·	LTP Charleston Pro Tennis	· 2019 →

Emina Bektas and Alexa Guarachi were the defending champions, but Bektas chose not to participate.

Guarachi played alongside Erin Routliffe and successfully defended her title. The pair defeated Louisa Chirico and Allie Kiick in the final, 6–1, 3–6, [10–5].

== Seeds ==
1. (Chile) Alexa Guarachi / (New Zealand) Erin Routliffe (champions)
2. (United States) Madison Brengle / (United States) Jamie Loeb (first round)
3. (United States) Jessica Pegula / (United States) Maria Sanchez (semifinals)
4. (United States) Sophie Chang / (United States) Alexandra Mueller (first round)

== Draw ==
=== Key ===
- Q = Qualifier
- WC = Wild card
- LL = Lucky loser
- Alt = Alternate
- SE = Special exempt
- PR = Protected ranking
- ITF = ITF entry
- JE = Junior exempt
- w/o = Walkover
- r = Retired
- d = Defaulted
- SR = Special ranking

=== Draw ===
First round
1	(Chile) A Guarachi (New Zealand) E Routliffe	6	6
(United States) A Kratzer (United States) W Osuigwe	3	1
(Brazil) PC Gonçalves (United States) J Robinson	2	6	[10]
(United States) J Elbaba (China) S Xu	6	3	[3]
3	(United States) J Pegula (United States) M Sanchez	6	3	[10]
WC	(United States) A Rodgers (United States) C Van Nguyen	4	6	[8]
WC	(United States) C Beck (United States) E Navarro	6	6
(Romania) J Cristian (United States) K Day	1	3
(United States) L Chirico (United States) A Kiick	6	6
(United States) N Gibbs (United States) C Liu	2	0
(United States) R McAdoo (United States) K Stewart	6	6
4	(United States) S Chang (United States) A Mueller	2	1
(Kazakhstan) A Danilina (United States) I Neel	7^{7}	6
(Canada) P Januskova (United States) M Schmidt	6^{3}	1
(United States) Q Gleason (United States) A Weinhold	7^{8}	7^{7}
2	(United States) M Brengle (United States) J Loeb	6^{6}	6^{5}

Quarterfinals
1	(Chile) A Guarachi (New Zealand) E Routliffe	6	7^{7}
(Brazil) PC Gonçalves (United States) J Robinson	1	6^{4}
3	(United States) J Pegula (United States) M Sanchez	6	6
WC	(United States) C Beck (United States) E Navarro	4	1
(United States) L Chirico (United States) A Kiick	6	4	[10]
(United States) R McAdoo (United States) K Stewart	3	6	[7]
(Kazakhstan) A Danilina (United States) I Neel	6	7^{7}
(United States) Q Gleason (United States) A Weinhold	2	6^{5}

Semifinals
1	(Chile) A Guarachi (New Zealand) E Routliffe	4	6	[11]
3	(United States) J Pegula (United States) M Sanchez	6	2	[9]
(United States) L Chirico (United States) A Kiick	7^{7}	6
(Kazakhstan) A Danilina (United States) I Neel	6^{2}	3

Final
1	(Chile) A Guarachi (New Zealand) E Routliffe	6	3	[10]
(United States) L Chirico (United States) A Kiick	1	6	[5]
