= 2017 LTP Charleston Pro Tennis – Singles =

Singles
- 2017 LTP Charleston Pro Tennis

Final
- Champion: (United States) Madison Brengle
- Runner-up: (United States) Danielle Collins
- Score: 4–6, 6–2, 6–3

Events
Singles	Doubles
LTP Charleston Pro Tennis	· 2018 →

This was a new event in the 2017 ITF Women's Circuit.

Madison Brengle won the title, defeating Danielle Collins in the final, 4–6, 6–2, 6–3.

== Seeds ==
1. (United States) Madison Brengle (champion)
2. (Bulgaria) Elitsa Kostova (first round)
3. (United States) Kayla Day (quarterfinals)
4. (Australia) Lizette Cabrera (first round)
5. (United States) Sofia Kenin (second round)
6. (Canada) Françoise Abanda (quarterfinals)
7. (Portugal) Michelle Larcher de Brito (second round)
8. (Bulgaria) Sesil Karatantcheva (first round)

== Draw ==
=== Key ===
- Q = Qualifier
- WC = Wild card
- LL = Lucky loser
- Alt = Alternate
- ITF = ITF entry
- PR = Protected ranking
- SR = Special ranking
- SE = Special exempt
- JE = Junior exempt
- JR = Junior Accelerator Programme entrant
- CO = College Accelerator Programme entrant
- NG = Next Gen Accelerator Program entrant
- w/o = Walkover
- r = Retired
- d = Defaulted

=== Finals ===
Semifinals
1	(United States) Madison Brengle	6	6
WC	(United States) Claire Liu	3	1
(United States) Danielle Collins	2	6	6
(Russia) Sofya Zhuk	6	3	3

Final
1	(United States) Madison Brengle	4	6	6
(United States) Danielle Collins	6	2	3

=== Top half ===
First round
1	(United States) M Brengle	6	6
(United States) C Dolehide	4	2
WC	(United States) E Navarro	3	2
(Croatia) A Tomljanović	6	6
(Canada) K Sebov	6	3	2
Q	(United States) L Embree	2	6	6
(United States) L Albanese	4	1
7	(Portugal) M Larcher de Brito	6	6
4	(Australia) L Cabrera	5	2
Q	(Canada) C Zhao	7	6
(United States) C Whoriskey	3	2
WC	(United States) C Liu	6	6
(Serbia) J Jakšić	5	7	7
(Mexico) R Zarazúa	7	5	5
LL	(United States) C Van Nguyen	3	1
6	(Canada) F Abanda	6	6

Second round
1	(United States) M Brengle	6	0
(Croatia) A Tomljanović	4	0^{r}
Q	(United States) L Embree	7	5	7^{7}
7	(Portugal) M Larcher de Brito	5	7	6^{5}
Q	(Canada) C Zhao	5	1
WC	(United States) C Liu	7	6
(Serbia) J Jakšić	4	5
6	(Canada) F Abanda	6	7

Quarterfinals
1	(United States) M Brengle	6	6
Q	(United States) L Embree	1	0
WC	(United States) C Liu	6	6
6	(Canada) F Abanda	1	1

Semifinals
1	(United States) M Brengle	6	6
WC	(United States) C Liu	3	1

=== Bottom half ===
First round
8	(Bulgaria) S Karatantcheva	7^{7}	1	2
(United States) D Collins	6^{3}	6	6
(United States) UM Arconada	6	4	4
(United States) E Halbauer	3	6	6
Q	(United States) E Bektas	4	6	6
Q	(United States) S Santamaria	6	2	2
(Mexico) V Rodríguez	0	6^{5}
3	(United States) K Day	6	7^{7}
5	(United States) S Kenin	7	6
(United States) M Sanchez	5	0
(Russia) S Zhuk	6	7^{7}
(Kazakhstan) K Kerimbayeva	3	6^{2}
(Ukraine) E Ianchuk	6	6
WC	(United States) R Yurovsky	1	1
WC	(United States) V Duval	7	6
2	(Bulgaria) E Kostova	5	3

Second round
(United States) D Collins	2	6	6
(United States) E Halbauer	6	1	1
Q	(United States) E Bektas	0	2
3	(United States) K Day	6	6
5	(United States) S Kenin	4	1
(Russia) S Zhuk	6	6
(Ukraine) E Ianchuk	6	1
WC	(United States) V Duval	3	1^{r}

Quarterfinals
(United States) D Collins	4	6	6
3	(United States) K Day	6	3	4
(Russia) S Zhuk	4	7	3
(Ukraine) E Ianchuk	6	5	2^{r}

Semifinals
(United States) D Collins	2	6	6
(Russia) S Zhuk	6	3	3
