= 2020 LTP Charleston Pro Tennis – Doubles =

Doubles
- 2020 LTP Charleston Pro Tennis

Final
- Champions: (Poland) Magdalena Fręch (Poland) Katarzyna Kawa
- Runners-up: (Australia) Astra Sharma (Egypt) Mayar Sherif
- Score: 4–6, 6–4, [10–2]

Events
Singles	Doubles
← 2019 ·	LTP Charleston Pro Tennis	· 2021 →

Asia Muhammad and Taylor Townsend were the defending champions but both players chose not to participate.

Magdalena Fręch and Katarzyna Kawa won the title, defeating Astra Sharma and Mayar Sherif in the final, 4–6, 6–4, [10–2].

== Seeds ==
1. (United States) Coco Gauff / (United States) Caty McNally (first round)
2. (Germany) Anna-Lena Friedsam / (Spain) Georgina García Pérez (first round)
3. (United States) Caroline Dolehide / (United States) Shelby Rogers (quarterfinals, withdrew)
4. (Poland) Paula Kania-Choduń / (Poland) Katarzyna Piter (quarterfinals)

== Draw ==
=== Key ===
- Q = Qualifier
- WC = Wild card
- LL = Lucky loser
- Alt = Alternate
- SE = Special exempt
- PR = Protected ranking
- ITF = ITF entry
- JE = Junior exempt
- w/o = Walkover
- r = Retired
- d = Defaulted
- SR = Special ranking

=== Draw ===
First round
1	(United States) C Gauff (United States) C McNally	5	6	[3]
(Poland) M Fręch (Poland) K Kawa	7	3	[10]
(Spain) A Bolsova (Mexico) R Zarazúa	7^{9}	6
WC	(United States) E Charney (United States) W Pate	6^{7}	1
4	(Poland) P Kania-Choduń (Poland) K Piter	6	6
(United States) L Davis (Romania) G Talabă	3	4
Alt	(Colombia) C Osorio (India) A Raina	7^{7}	2	[5]
(United States) I Neel (United States) C Whoriskey	6^{0}	6	[10]
(United Kingdom) N Broady (New Zealand) E Routliffe	4	3
WC	(United States) A Zamarripa (United States) M Zamarripa	6	6
(Kazakhstan) A Danilina (Germany) V Heisen	2	5
3	(United States) C Dolehide (United States) S Rogers	6	7
(Ukraine) K Bondarenko (Belarus) O Govortsova	2	6	[10]
WC	(United States) E Navarro (United States) K Shaffer	6	4	[8]
(Australia) A Sharma (Egypt) M Sherif	6	6
2	(Germany) A-L Friedsam (Spain) G García Pérez	4	4

Quarterfinals
(Poland) M Fręch (Poland) K Kawa	6	6
(Spain) A Bolsova (Mexico) R Zarazúa	3	1
4	(Poland) P Kania-Choduń (Poland) K Piter	4	3
(United States) I Neel (United States) C Whoriskey	6	6
WC	(United States) A Zamarripa (United States) M Zamarripa	w/o
3	(United States) C Dolehide (United States) S Rogers
(Ukraine) K Bondarenko (Belarus) O Govortsova	1	6	[6]
(Australia) A Sharma (Egypt) M Sherif	6	3	[10]

Semifinals
(Poland) M Fręch (Poland) K Kawa	7^{7}	6
(United States) I Neel (United States) C Whoriskey	6^{5}	2
WC	(United States) A Zamarripa (United States) M Zamarripa	6^{2}	5
(Australia) A Sharma (Egypt) M Sherif	7^{7}	7

Final
(Poland) M Fręch (Poland) K Kawa	4	6	[10]
(Australia) A Sharma (Egypt) M Sherif	6	4	[2]
