= 2023 LTP Charleston Pro Tennis – Doubles =

Doubles
- 2023 LTP Charleston Pro Tennis

Final
- Champions: (United States) Sophie Chang (United States) Angela Kulikov
- Runners-up: (United States) Ashlyn Krueger (United States) Robin Montgomery
- Score: 6–3, 6–4

Events
Singles	Doubles
← 2022 ·	LTP Charleston Pro Tennis	· 2024 →

Katarzyna Kawa and Aldila Sutjiadi were the defending champions but Sutjiadi chose not to participate. Kawa originally intended to defend her title alongside Elvina Kalieva but the pair withdrew before the first round.

Sophie Chang and Angela Kulikov won the title, defeating Ashlyn Krueger and Robin Montgomery in the final, 6–3, 6–4.

== Seeds ==
1. (United States) Sophie Chang / (United States) Angela Kulikov (champions)
2. (United States) Kaitlyn Christian / (United States) Sabrina Santamaria (quarterfinals)
3. (Chinese Taipei) Liang En-shuo / (Australia) Olivia Tjandramulia (semifinals)
4. (United States) Elvina Kalieva / (Poland) Katarzyna Kawa (withdrew)

== Draw ==
=== Key ===
- Q = Qualifier
- WC = Wild card
- LL = Lucky loser
- Alt = Alternate
- SE = Special exempt
- PR = Protected ranking
- ITF = ITF entry
- JE = Junior exempt
- w/o = Walkover
- r = Retired
- d = Defaulted
- SR = Special ranking

First round
1	(United States) S Chang (United States) A Kulikov	6	6
(Argentina) P Ormaechea (Mexico) R Zarazúa	2	3
WC	(United States) D Hewitt (United States) J Loeb	6	6
Alt	(United States) A Glatch (Romania) G Lee	2	4
3	(Chinese Taipei) E-s Liang (Australia) O Tjandramulia	7^{7}	4	[10]
(United States) T Ng (United States) C Rosca	6^{3}	6	[8]
WC	(United States) P Dougherty (United States) M Horvit	3	0
(Argentina) ML Carlé (Mexico) M Zacarías	6	6
(United States) A Krueger (United States) R Montgomery	7^{7}	5	[10]
(United States) Q Gleason (United States) A Rogers	6^{3}	7	[5]
Alt	(United Kingdom) Y Miyazaki (Australia) A Osborne	7^{7}	6
Alt	(United States) S Daavettila (United States) V Hu	6^{4}	4
(Indonesia) J Rompies (India) P Thombare	6	6
(Japan) N Hibino (Canada) C Zhao	1	3
(United States) M Brengle (United States) M Mateas	0	4
2	(United States) K Christian (United States) S Santamaria	6	6

Quarterfinals
1	(United States) S Chang (United States) A Kulikov	2	6	[10]
WC	(United States) D Hewitt (United States) J Loeb	6	4	[7]
3	(Chinese Taipei) E-s Liang (Australia) O Tjandramulia	6	2	[10]
(Argentina) ML Carlé (Mexico) M Zacarías	3	6	[5]
(United States) A Krueger (United States) R Montgomery	6	7
Alt	(United Kingdom) Y Miyazaki (Australia) A Osborne	3	5
(Indonesia) J Rompies (India) P Thombare	2	6	[11]
2	(United States) K Christian (United States) S Santamaria	6	2	[9]

Semifinals
1	(United States) S Chang (United States) A Kulikov	6	6
3	(Chinese Taipei) E-s Liang (Australia) O Tjandramulia	2	0
(United States) A Krueger (United States) R Montgomery	6^{5}	6	[10]
(Indonesia) J Rompies (India) P Thombare	7^{7}	4	[5]

Final
1	(United States) S Chang (United States) A Kulikov	6	6
(United States) A Krueger (United States) R Montgomery	3	4
