= 2019 LTP Charleston Pro Tennis – Singles =

Singles
- 2019 LTP Charleston Pro Tennis

Final
- Champion: (United States) Taylor Townsend
- Runner-up: (United States) Whitney Osuigwe
- Score: 6–4, 6–4

Events
Singles	Doubles
← 2018 ·	LTP Charleston Pro Tennis	· 2020 →

Taylor Townsend was the defending champion, and successfully defended her title, defeating Whitney Osuigwe in the final, 6–4, 6–4.

== Seeds ==
1. (United States) Madison Brengle (first round)
2. (United States) Taylor Townsend (champion)
3. (United States) Nicole Gibbs (quarterfinals)
4. (Ukraine) Anhelina Kalinina (quarterfinals)
5. (United States) Lauren Davis (second round)
6. (United States) Sachia Vickery (withdrew)
7. (Slovenia) Kaja Juvan (semifinals)
8. (United States) Allie Kiick (first round)
9. (Australia) Kimberly Birrell (first round)

== Draw ==
=== Key ===
- Q = Qualifier
- WC = Wild card
- LL = Lucky loser
- Alt = Alternate
- SE = Special exempt
- PR = Protected ranking
- ITF = ITF entry
- JE = Junior exempt
- w/o = Walkover
- r = Retired
- d = Defaulted
- SR = Special ranking

=== Finals ===
Semifinals
(United States) Whitney Osuigwe	2	6	6
7	(Slovenia) Kaja Juvan	6	2	4
WC	(United States) Emma Navarro	1	4
2	(United States) Taylor Townsend	6	6

Final
(United States) Whitney Osuigwe	4	4
2	(United States) Taylor Townsend	6	6

=== Top half ===
First round
1	(United States) M Brengle	5	6^{5}
Q	(Israel) D Khazaniuk	7	7^{7}
Q	(United States) L Chirico	6	6
(United States) C Dolehide	0	4
Q	(United States) S Chang	1	4
(United States) W Osuigwe	6	6
(Australia) L Cabrera	2	7^{10}	2
5	(United States) L Davis	6	6^{8}	6
3	(United States) N Gibbs	7	6
(Bulgaria) S Karatantcheva	5	1
(United States) R Anderson	6	6
Q	(Italy) G Sanesi	4	3
Q	(Australia) B Woolcock	6	7^{7}
WC	(United States) R McAdoo	2	6^{1}
LL	(Australia) A Myers	3	0
7	(Slovenia) K Juvan	6	6

Second round
Q	(Israel) D Khazaniuk	6	5	2
Q	(United States) L Chirico	3	7	6
(United States) W Osuigwe	2	6	6
5	(United States) L Davis	6	3	3
3	(United States) N Gibbs	6	7
(United States) R Anderson	4	5
Q	(Australia) B Woolcock	4	4
7	(Slovenia) K Juvan	6	6

Quarterfinals
Q	(United States) L Chirico	0	4
(United States) W Osuigwe	6	6
3	(United States) N Gibbs	1	4
7	(Slovenia) K Juvan	6	6

Semifinals
(United States) W Osuigwe	2	6	6
7	(Slovenia) K Juvan	6	2	4

=== Bottom half ===
First round
8	(United States) A Kiick	3	0
WC	(United States) E Navarro	6	6
PR	(Czech Republic) L Hradecká	1	0
WC	(United States) A Li	6	6
WC	(United States) A Parks	6	0	6
(Australia) E Perez	4	6	2
(United States) A Muhammad	3	6	5
4	(Ukraine) A Kalinina	6	1	7
9	(Australia) K Birrell	4	3
Q	(United States) C Gauff	6	6
(Paraguay) V Cepede Royg	1	7	6
Q	(Japan) M Osaka	6	5	3
Q	(United States) K Day	7^{7}	6
(United States) C Liu	6^{4}	4
(Canada) K Sebov	4	6	2
2	(United States) T Townsend	6	4	6

Second round
WC	(United States) E Navarro	6	6
WC	(United States) A Li	3	4
WC	(United States) A Parks	2	4
4	(Ukraine) A Kalinina	6	6
Q	(United States) C Gauff	6	6
(Paraguay) V Cepede Royg	4	1
Q	(United States) K Day	4	1
2	(United States) T Townsend	6	6

Quarterfinals
WC	(United States) E Navarro	6	6
4	(Ukraine) A Kalinina	4	4
Q	(United States) C Gauff	0	6	1
2	(United States) T Townsend	6	2	6

Semifinals
WC	(United States) E Navarro	1	4
2	(United States) T Townsend	6	6
