= 2025 Hall of Fame Open – Men's singles =

Men's singles
- 2025 Hall of Fame Open

Final
- Champion: (United States) Zachary Svajda
- Runner-up: (France) Adrian Mannarino
- Score: 7–5, 6–3

Events
Singles	men	women
Doubles	men	women
- Hall of Fame Open

Marcos Giron was the defending champion but chose not to defend his title.

Zachary Svajda won the title after defeating Adrian Mannarino 7–5, 6–3 in the final.

== Seeds ==
1. (United States) Brandon Holt (second round)
2. (Australia) James Duckworth (first round)
3. (Australia) Tristan Schoolkate (quarterfinals)
4. (France) Adrian Mannarino (final)
5. (United States) Eliot Spizzirri (semifinals)
6. (United States) Christopher Eubanks (second round)
7. (United States) Mitchell Krueger (second round)
8. (Japan) Yosuke Watanuki (quarterfinals)

== Draw ==
Key

- Q = Qualifier
- WC = Wild card
- LL = Lucky loser
- Alt = Alternate
- ITF = ITF entry
- PR = Protected ranking
- SR = Special ranking
- SE = Special exempt
- JE = Junior exempt
- JR = Junior Accelerator Programme entrant
- CO = College Accelerator Programme entrant
- NG = Next Gen Accelerator Program entrant
- w/o = Walkover
- r = Retired
- d = Defaulted

=== Finals ===
Semifinals
(United States) Zachary Svajda	6	6
5	(United States) Eliot Spizzirri	3	4
4	(France) Adrian Mannarino	6	7
Q	(France) Antoine Ghibaudo	2	5

Final
(United States) Zachary Svajda	7	6
4	(France) Adrian Mannarino	5	3

=== Top half ===
First round
1	(United States) B Holt	7^{7}	7^{7}
(United States) M Cassone	6^{3}	6^{1}
Q	(United States) Q Vandecasteele	2	3
(United States) Z Svajda	6	6
Alt	(United States) K Poling	6^{5}	6	6^{3}
Q	(United Kingdom) Oscar Weightman	7^{7}	3	7^{7}
(Australia) O Jasika	4	4
8	(Japan) Y Watanuki	6	6
3	(Australia) T Schoolkate	7^{7}	7^{7}
(Australia) A Bolt	6^{4}	6^{2}
(Australia) J McCabe	6	6
Q	(United States) A Ayeni	1	2
Alt	(Canada) D Martin	5	6	3
(United States) A Mayo	7	4	6
WC	(United States) E Zhu	5	2
5	(United States) E Spizzirri	7	6

Second round
1	(United States) B Holt	6	0	1
(United States) Z Svajda	4	6	6
Q	(United Kingdom) O Weightman	2	3
8	(Japan) Y Watanuki	6	6
3	(Australia) T Schoolkate	6^{5}	7^{7}	4
(Australia) J McCabe	7^{7}	6^{5}	0^{r}
(United States) A Mayo	4	4
5	(United States) E Spizzirri	6	6

Quarterfinals
(United States) Z Svajda	7	6
8	(Japan) Y Watanuki	5	4
3	(Australia) T Schoolkate	6	4	4
5	(United States) E Spizzirri	4	6	6

Semifinals
(United States) Z Svajda	6	6
5	(United States) E Spizzirri	3	4

=== Bottom half ===
First round
6	(United States) C Eubanks	4	6	6
WC	(United States) D Milavsky	6	4	3
WC	(United States) M Zheng	4	3
(Australia) B Tomic	6	6
Q	(United States) T Hilderbrand	6	4	3
(United States) T Zink	4	6	6
(Japan) Y Uchiyama	3	4
4	(France) A Mannarino	6	6
7	(United States) M Krueger	6	3	6
Alt	(United States) S Kozlov	1	6	1
(United States) P Kypson	6^{1}	5
Q	(France) A Ghibaudo	7^{7}	7
Q	(United States) Tristan McCormick	6^{5}	6^{4}
LL	(New Zealand) J Watt	7^{7}	7^{7}
(United States) Patrick Maloney	6	7^{7}
2	(Australia) J Duckworth	2	6^{5}

Second round
6	(United States) C Eubanks	3	4
(Australia) B Tomic	6	6
(United States) T Zink	3	5
4	(France) A Mannarino	6	7
7	(United States) M Krueger	4	7	3
Q	(France) A Ghibaudo	6	5	6
LL	(New Zealand) J Watt	6	6
(United States) P Maloney	3	3

Quarterfinals
(Australia) B Tomic	6	2	1
4	(France) A Mannarino	4	6	6
Q	(France) A Ghibaudo	6	6
LL	(New Zealand) J Watt	3	1

Semifinals
4	(France) A Mannarino	6	7
Q	(France) A Ghibaudo	2	5
