= 2023 LTP Charleston Pro Tennis – Singles =

Singles
- 2023 LTP Charleston Pro Tennis

Final
- Champion: (United States) Emma Navarro
- Runner-up: (United States) Peyton Stearns
- Score: 2–6, 6–2, 7–5

Events
Singles	Doubles
- LTP Charleston Pro Tennis

Taylor Townsend was the defending champion but chose not to participate.

Emma Navarro won the title, defeating Peyton Stearns in the final, 2–6, 6–2, 7–5.

== Seeds ==
1. (United States) Peyton Stearns (final)
2. (United States) Madison Brengle (semifinals)
3. (United States) Emma Navarro (champion)
4. (Japan) Nao Hibino (quarterfinals)
5. (China) Yuan Yue (quarterfinals)
6. (United States) Elizabeth Mandlik (second round)
7. (United States) Caroline Dolehide (semifinals)
8. (United States) Ashlyn Krueger (second round)

== Draw ==
Key

- Q = Qualifier
- WC = Wild card
- LL = Lucky loser
- Alt = Alternate
- ITF = ITF entry
- PR = Protected ranking
- SR = Special ranking
- SE = Special exempt
- JE = Junior exempt
- JR = Junior Accelerator Programme entrant
- CO = College Accelerator Programme entrant
- NG = Next Gen Accelerator Program entrant
- w/o = Walkover
- r = Retired
- d = Defaulted

=== Finals ===
Semifinals
1	(United States) Peyton Stearns	6	7
7	(United States) Caroline Dolehide	2	5
3	(United States) Emma Navarro	6	6
2	(United States) Madison Brengle	3	0

Final
1	(United States) Peyton Stearns	6	2	5
3	(United States) Emma Navarro	2	6	7

=== Top half ===
First round
1	(United States) P Stearns	6	6
(Mexico) M Zacarías	2	3
(United States) S Vickery	6	6
(Argentina) P Ormaechea	1	3
Q	(United States) C Beck	7	6
Q	(Canada) C Brace	5	2
(United States) L Chirico	1	3
6	(United States) E Mandlik	6	6
4	(Japan) N Hibino	7	6
(United States) K Scott	5	2
(United States) K Day	6	6
Q	(Chinese Taipei) E-s Liang	2	1
WC	(United States) S Chang	4	7^{7}	4
Q	(United States) T Ng	6	6^{4}	6
WC	(United States) W Osuigwe	6^{1}	0
7	(United States) C Dolehide	7^{7}	6

Second round
1	(United States) P Stearns	7	6
(United States) S Vickery	5	2
Q	(United States) C Beck	6	6
6	(United States) E Mandlik	1	0
4	(Japan) N Hibino	6	6
(United States) K Day	1	2
Q	(United States) T Ng	5	6	2
7	(United States) C Dolehide	7	3	6

Quarterfinals
1	(United States) P Stearns	6	6
Q	(United States) C Beck	1	2
4	(Japan) N Hibino	2	3
7	(United States) C Dolehide	6	6

Semifinals
1	(United States) P Stearns	6	7
7	(United States) C Dolehide	2	5

=== Bottom half ===
First round
5	(China) Y Yuan	6	6
(Canada) C Zhao	3	2
Q	(Mexico) R Zarazúa	5	6	7^{7}
WC	(United States) E Kalieva	7	4	6^{5}
WC	(United States) M Mateas	6	5	3
(United States) R Montgomery	2	7	6
(United Kingdom) Y Miyazaki	1	5
3	(United States) E Navarro	6	7
8	(United States) A Krueger	6	4	6
(Argentina) ML Carlé	4	6	3
Q	(Australia) S Hunter	6	2	6
Q	(United States) G Min	3	6	2
Q	(United States) L Hovde	6^{0}	6	6
(France) C Paquet	7^{7}	2	2
(United States) A Li	5	6	3
2	(United States) M Brengle	7	1	6

Second round
5	(China) Y Yuan	7	6
Q	(Mexico) R Zarazúa	5	2
(United States) R Montgomery	3	2
3	(United States) E Navarro	6	6
8	(United States) A Krueger	6	4	1
Q	(Australia) S Hunter	2	6	6
Q	(United States) L Hovde	3	2
2	(United States) M Brengle	6	6

Quarterfinals
5	(China) Y Yuan	3	2
3	(United States) E Navarro	6	6
Q	(Australia) S Hunter	3	6	3
2	(United States) M Brengle	6	3	6

Semifinals
3	(United States) E Navarro	6	6
2	(United States) M Brengle	3	0
