= 2021 LTP Charleston Pro Tennis – Doubles =

Doubles
- 2021 LTP Charleston Pro Tennis

Final
- Champions: (United States) Caty McNally (Australia) Storm Sanders
- Runners-up: (Japan) Eri Hozumi (Japan) Miyu Kato
- Score: 7–5, 4–6, [10–6]

Events
Singles	Doubles
← 2020 ·	LTP Charleston Pro Tennis	· 2022 →

Magdalena Fręch and Katarzyna Kawa were the defending champions but chose not to participate.

Caty McNally and Storm Sanders won the title, defeating Eri Hozumi and Miyu Kato in the final, 7–5, 4–6, [10–6].

== Seeds ==
1. (United States) Caty McNally / (Australia) Storm Sanders (champions)
2. (United States) Caroline Dolehide / (United States) Maria Sanchez (first round)
3. (Kazakhstan) Anna Danilina / (Australia) Arina Rodionova (first round)
4. (Japan) Eri Hozumi / (Japan) Miyu Kato (final)

== Draw ==
=== Key ===
- Q = Qualifier
- WC = Wild card
- LL = Lucky loser
- Alt = Alternate
- SE = Special exempt
- PR = Protected ranking
- ITF = ITF entry
- JE = Junior exempt
- w/o = Walkover
- r = Retired
- d = Defaulted
- SR = Special ranking

=== Draw ===
First round
1	(United States) C McNally (Australia) S Sanders	6^{1}	6	[10]
(United States) K Ahn (United States) E Bektas	7^{7}	2	[6]
(New Zealand) E Routliffe (Indonesia) A Sutjiadi	6	6
(Slovakia) T Mihalíková (United States) I Neel	1	3
3	(Kazakhstan) A Danilina (Australia) Ar Rodionova	4	6	[9]
(Romania) I Bara (Egypt) M Sherif	6	4	[11]
WC	(United States) H Baptiste (United States) W Osuigwe	6	6
WC	(United States) S Chang (United States) T Ng	2	3
WC	(United States) W Pate (United States) K Shaffer	1	2
(Belarus) O Govortsova (Mexico) R Zarazúa	6	6
(United States) F Di Lorenzo (United Kingdom) T Moore	2	3
4	(Japan) E Hozumi (Japan) M Kato	6	6
(Indonesia) B Gumulya (Indonesia) J Rompies	3	2
(Serbia) A Krunić (Poland) U Radwańska	6	6
(United States) Q Gleason (United States) J Loeb	6	6
2	(United States) C Dolehide (United States) M Sanchez	2	3

Quarterfinals
1	(United States) C McNally (Australia) S Sanders	4	6	[10]
(New Zealand) E Routliffe (Indonesia) A Sutjiadi	6	0	[7]
(Romania) I Bara (Egypt) M Sherif	4	4
WC	(United States) H Baptiste (United States) W Osuigwe	6	6
(Belarus) O Govortsova (Mexico) R Zarazúa	3	3
4	(Japan) E Hozumi (Japan) M Kato	6	6
(Serbia) A Krunić (Poland) U Radwańska	6	7^{7}
(United States) Q Gleason (United States) J Loeb	4	6^{1}

Semifinals
1	(United States) C McNally (Australia) S Sanders	6	6
WC	(United States) H Baptiste (United States) W Osuigwe	2	2
4	(Japan) E Hozumi (Japan) M Kato	7	6
(Serbia) A Krunić (Poland) U Radwańska	5	1

Final
1	(United States) C McNally (Australia) S Sanders	7	4	[10]
4	(Japan) E Hozumi (Japan) M Kato	5	6	[6]
