= 2021 LTP Charleston Pro Tennis – Singles =

Singles
- 2021 LTP Charleston Pro Tennis

Final
- Champion: (United States) Claire Liu
- Runner-up: (United States) Madison Brengle
- Score: 6–2, 7–6^{(8–6)}

Events
Singles	Doubles
← 2020 ·	LTP Charleston Pro Tennis	· 2022 →

Mayar Sherif was the defending champion but lost to Claire Liu in the second round.

Liu went on to win the title, defeating Madison Brengle in the final, 6–2, 7–6^{(8–6)}.

== Seeds ==
1. (United States) Madison Brengle (final)
2. (United States) Caty McNally (first round)
3. (Egypt) Mayar Sherif (second round)
4. (United States) Kristie Ahn (first round)
5. (Romania) Irina Bara (second round)
6. (Mexico) Renata Zarazúa (quarterfinals)
7. (Belarus) Olga Govortsova (quarterfinals)
8. (China) Wang Xinyu (first round)

== Draw ==
=== Key ===
- Q = Qualifier
- WC = Wild card
- LL = Lucky loser
- Alt = Alternate
- SE = Special exempt
- PR = Protected ranking
- ITF = ITF entry
- JE = Junior exempt
- w/o = Walkover
- r = Retired
- d = Defaulted
- SR = Special ranking

=== Finals ===
Semifinals
1	(United States) Madison Brengle	7^{8}	6
(Poland) Magdalena Fręch	6^{6}	3
SE	(United States) Claire Liu	4	6	6
(United Kingdom) Harriet Dart	6	3	3

Final
1	(United States) Madison Brengle	2	6^{6}
SE	(United States) Claire Liu	6	7^{8}

=== Top half ===
First round
1	(United States) M Brengle	6	6
(United States) W Osuigwe	1	0
(United States) F Di Lorenzo	1	2
(Paraguay) V Cepede Royg	6	6
(Australia) S Sanders	6	6
(Romania) G Talabă	0	1
WC	(United States) K Volynets	2	6	6
8	(China) Xin Wang	6	3	2
4	(United States) K Ahn	4	3
(Poland) M Fręch	6	6
WC	(United States) K Shaffer	3	1
Q	(United States) V Duval	6	6
Q	(Japan) E Hozumi	4	6	1
(United States) G Min	6	1	6
(United States) H Baptiste	4	1
6	(Mexico) R Zarazúa	6	6

Second round
1	(United States) M Brengle	7	6
(Paraguay) V Cepede Royg	5	2
(Australia) S Sanders	2	0
WC	(United States) K Volynets	6	6
(Poland) M Fręch	4	6	6
Q	(United States) V Duval	6	4	1
(United States) G Min	2	1
6	(Mexico) R Zarazúa	6	6

Quarterfinals
1	(United States) M Brengle	7	7^{7}
WC	(United States) K Volynets	5	6^{3}
(Poland) M Fręch	6	6
6	(Mexico) R Zarazúa	4	1

Semifinals
1	(United States) M Brengle	7^{8}	6
(Poland) M Fręch	6^{6}	3

=== Bottom half ===
First round
5	(Romania) I Bara	4	6	6
(United States) A Kiick	6	3	0
Q	(Russia) A Anshba	7	3	0
Q	(United States) J Loeb	5	6	6
SE	(United States) C Liu	6	6
WC	(United States) A Parks	4	4
Q	(Poland) U Radwańska	4	3
3	(Egypt) M Sherif	6	6
7	(Belarus) O Govortsova	6	7
Q	(Serbia) A Krunić	3	5
(United States) C Dolehide	1	6	4
Q	(Indonesia) A Sutjiadi	6	2	6
Q	(Netherlands) A Hartono	1	6	4
(Australia) Ar Rodionova	6	2	6
(United Kingdom) H Dart	6^{5}	6	6
2/WC	(United States) C McNally	7^{7}	4	3

Second round
5	(Romania) I Bara	6	6^{4}	3
Q	(United States) J Loeb	4	7^{7}	6
SE	(United States) C Liu	6	6
3	(Egypt) M Sherif	3	0
7	(Belarus) O Govortsova	7	0	6
Q	(Indonesia) A Sutjiadi	5	6	4
(Australia) Ar Rodionova	6^{3}	6	1
(United Kingdom) H Dart	7^{7}	4	6

Quarterfinals
Q	(United States) J Loeb	2	4
SE	(United States) C Liu	6	6
7	(Belarus) O Govortsova	7^{7}	3	4
(United Kingdom) H Dart	6^{5}	6	6

Semifinals
SE	(United States) C Liu	4	6	6
(United Kingdom) H Dart	6	3	3
