= 2019 LTP Charleston Pro Tennis – Doubles =

Doubles
- 2019 LTP Charleston Pro Tennis

Final
- Champions: (United States) Asia Muhammad (United States) Taylor Townsend
- Runners-up: (United States) Madison Brengle (United States) Lauren Davis
- Score: 6–2, 6–2

Events
Singles	Doubles
← 2018 ·	LTP Charleston Pro Tennis	· 2020 →

Alexa Guarachi and Erin Routliffe were the defending champions, however Guarachi chose to compete at the 2019 Grand Prix SAR La Princesse Lalla Meryem instead. Routliffe played alongside Allie Kiick, but lost in the semifinals to Madison Brengle and Lauren Davis.

Asia Muhammad and Taylor Townsend won the title, defeating Brengle and Davis in the final, 6–2, 6–2.

== Seeds ==
1. (United States) Asia Muhammad / (United States) Taylor Townsend (champions)
2. (United States) Ingrid Neel / (Australia) Ellen Perez (quarterfinals)
3. (United States) Sophie Chang / (United States) Alexandra Mueller (first round)
4. (Australia) Lizette Cabrera / (United States) Louisa Chirico (first round)

== Draw ==
=== Key ===
- Q = Qualifier
- WC = Wild card
- LL = Lucky loser
- Alt = Alternate
- SE = Special exempt
- PR = Protected ranking
- ITF = ITF entry
- JE = Junior exempt
- w/o = Walkover
- r = Retired
- d = Defaulted
- SR = Special ranking

=== Draw ===
First round
1	(United States) A Muhammad (United States) T Townsend	6	6
(United States) C Beck (United States) E Navarro	2	4
(Israel) D Khazaniuk (United States) S Vickery	1^{r}
(United States) C Liu (Canada) K Sebov	2
3	(United States) S Chang (United States) A Mueller	6	6^{7}	[8]
(United States) K Day (Ukraine) A Kalinina	3	7^{9}	[10]
(Moldova) A Perper (Romania) G Talabă	1	3
(United States) C Gauff (United States) R McAdoo	6	6
(United States) M Brengle (United States) L Davis	6	2	[10]
WC	(United States) J Kissell (United States) R Newborn	3	6	[4]
(United States) S Marand (Mexico) V Rodríguez	3	6	[10]
4	(Australia) L Cabrera (United States) L Chirico	6	3	[8]
WC	(United States) W Pate (United States) A Ross	4	4
(United States) A Kiick (New Zealand) E Routliffe	6	6
WC	(United States) C Billman (United States) S Maheshwari	1	1
2	(United States) I Neel (Australia) E Perez	6	6

Quarterfinals
1	(United States) A Muhammad (United States) T Townsend	6	4	[10]
(United States) C Liu (Canada) K Sebov	4	6	[1]
(United States) K Day (Ukraine) A Kalinina	1	6^{5}
(United States) C Gauff (United States) R McAdoo	6	7^{7}
(United States) M Brengle (United States) L Davis	6	3	[10]
(United States) S Marand (Mexico) V Rodríguez	2	6	[7]
(United States) A Kiick (New Zealand) E Routliffe	6^{2}	6	[10]
2	(United States) I Neel (Australia) E Perez	7^{7}	2	[2]

Semifinals
1	(United States) A Muhammad (United States) T Townsend	6	6
(United States) C Gauff (United States) R McAdoo	3	1
(United States) M Brengle (United States) L Davis	5	6	[10]
(United States) A Kiick (New Zealand) E Routliffe	7	3	[8]

Final
1	(United States) A Muhammad (United States) T Townsend	6	6
(United States) M Brengle (United States) L Davis	2	2
