= 2018 LTP Charleston Pro Tennis – Singles =

Singles
- 2018 LTP Charleston Pro Tennis

Final
- Champion: (United States) Taylor Townsend
- Runner-up: (United States) Madison Brengle
- Score: 6–0, 6–4

Events
Singles	Doubles
← 2017 ·	LTP Charleston Pro Tennis	· 2019 →

Madison Brengle was the defending champion but lost in the final to Taylor Townsend, 0–6 4–6.

== Seeds ==
1. (United States) Madison Brengle (final)
2. (United States) Taylor Townsend (champion)
3. (Colombia) Mariana Duque Mariño (second round)
4. (United States) Nicole Gibbs (second round)
5. (United States) Kristie Ahn (first round)
6. (Ukraine) Anhelina Kalinina (second round)
7. (United States) Jamie Loeb (quarterfinals)
8. (United States) Irina Falconi (quarterfinals)

== Draw ==
=== Key ===
- Q = Qualifier
- WC = Wild card
- LL = Lucky loser
- Alt = Alternate
- SE = Special exempt
- PR = Protected ranking
- ITF = ITF entry
- JE = Junior exempt
- w/o = Walkover
- r = Retired
- d = Defaulted
- SR = Special ranking

=== Finals ===
Semifinals
1	(United States) Madison Brengle	6	6
Q	(Poland) Iga Świątek	1	1
Q	(United States) Katerina Stewart	4	1
2	(United States) Taylor Townsend	6	6

Final
1	(United States) Madison Brengle	0	4
2	(United States) Taylor Townsend	6	6

=== Top half ===
First round
1	(United States) M Brengle	6	7
(United States) UM Arconada	0	5
(United States) A Kratzer	6	6
WC	(United States) M Mateas	2	4
(United States) C Liu	3	2
PR	(United States) A Kiick	6	6
(Bulgaria) S Karatantcheva	2	5
6	(Ukraine) A Kalinina	6	7
3	(Colombia) M Duque Mariño	6	6
(United States) F Di Lorenzo	3	1
Q	(Poland) I Świątek	6	6
WC	(United States) E Navarro	0	2
(United States) S Chang	2	6^{5}
(United States) G Min	6	7^{7}
Q	(Italy) C Rosatello	0	2
8	(United States) I Falconi	6	6

Second round
1	(United States) M Brengle	5	6	6
(United States) A Kratzer	7	4	3
PR	(United States) A Kiick	6	7
6	(Ukraine) A Kalinina	2	5
3	(Colombia) M Duque Mariño	4	2
Q	(Poland) I Świątek	6	6
(United States) G Min	7^{7}	5	0
8	(United States) I Falconi	6^{5}	7	6

Quarterfinals
1	(United States) M Brengle	7^{7}	7
PR	(United States) A Kiick	6^{2}	5
Q	(Poland) I Świątek	6	6
8	(United States) I Falconi	3	1

Semifinals
1	(United States) M Brengle	6	6
Q	(Poland) I Świątek	1	1

=== Bottom half ===
First round
7	(United States) J Loeb	6	6
WC	(United States) Q Gleason	3	2
(United States) K Day	6^{4}	0
WC	(United States) J Pegula	7^{7}	6
(Mexico) AS Sánchez	3	2
Q	(United States) K Stewart	6	6
Q	(Brazil) PC Gonçalves	3	6^{5}
4	(United States) N Gibbs	6	7^{7}
5	(United States) K Ahn	1	1
JE	(United States) W Osuigwe	6	6
(United States) M Sanchez	5	4
(Canada) K Sebov	7	6
(Japan) R Ozaki	6	6
(United States) L Chirico	4	2
(Romania) J Cristian	3	2
2	(United States) T Townsend	6	6

Second round
7	(United States) J Loeb	2	6	7
WC	(United States) J Pegula	6	4	5
Q	(United States) K Stewart	6	6
4	(United States) N Gibbs	0	1
JE	(United States) W Osuigwe	7^{7}	6
(Canada) K Sebov	6^{5}	0
(Japan) R Ozaki	0	3
2	(United States) T Townsend	6	6

Quarterfinals
7	(United States) J Loeb	6^{5}	0
Q	(United States) K Stewart	7^{7}	6
JE	(United States) W Osuigwe	0	6	5
2	(United States) T Townsend	6	1	7

Semifinals
Q	(United States) K Stewart	4	1
2	(United States) T Townsend	6	6
