= 2025 Hall of Fame Open – Men's doubles =

Men's doubles
- 2025 Hall of Fame Open

Final
- Champions: (United States) Robert Cash (United States) JJ Tracy
- Runners-up: (Mexico) Hans Hach Verdugo (Colombia) Cristian Rodríguez
- Score: 7–6^{(7–3)}, 6–3

Events
Singles	men	women
Doubles	men	women
- Hall of Fame Open

André Göransson and Sem Verbeek were the defending champions but chose not to defend their title.

Robert Cash and JJ Tracy won the title after defeating Hans Hach Verdugo and Cristian Rodríguez 7–6^{(7–3)}, 6–3 in the final.

== Seeds ==
1. (United States) Robert Cash / (United States) JJ Tracy (champions)
2. (India) Anirudh Chandrasekar / (United States) Reese Stalder (semifinals)
3. (Australia) Blake Bayldon / (United States) Trey Hilderbrand (semifinals)
4. (India) Niki Kaliyanda Poonacha / (India) Jeevan Nedunchezhiyan (quarterfinals)

== Draw ==
Key

- Q = Qualifier
- WC = Wild card
- LL = Lucky loser
- Alt = Alternate
- ITF = ITF entry
- PR = Protected ranking
- SR = Special ranking
- SE = Special exempt
- JE = Junior exempt
- JR = Junior Accelerator Programme entrant
- CO = College Accelerator Programme entrant
- NG = Next Gen Accelerator Program entrant
- w/o = Walkover
- r = Retired
- d = Defaulted

=== Draw ===
First round
1/WC	(United States) R Cash (United States) JJ Tracy	6	7^{7}
(New Zealand) F Reynolds (New Zealand) J Watt	4	6^{1}
(Brazil) L Britto (Brazil) Bruno Oliveira	7^{8}	5	[5]
(United States) M Kiger (United States) E Spizzirri	6^{6}	7	[10]
3	(Australia) B Bayldon (United States) T Hilderbrand	6	7
(United States) Zachary Fuchs (United States) Wally Thayne	4	5
WC	(United States) WA Ackman (United States) J Sock	1	5
(Australia) O Jasika (Australia) B Tomic	6	7
(United States) M Cassone (United States) A Mayo	3	2^{r}
(Mexico) H Hach Verdugo (Colombia) C Rodríguez	6	3
(United States) Patrick Maloney (United States) T Zink	5	6	[7]
4	(India) N Kaliyanda Poonacha (India) J Nedunchezhiyan	7	4	[10]
(United States) P Kumar (United States) J Sheehy	6^{6}	5
(Japan) Y Watanuki (Japan) T Yuzuki	7^{8}	7
(United States) B Holt (United States) Z Svajda	2	2
2	(India) A Chandrasekar (United States) R Stalder	6	6

Quarterfinals
1/WC	(United States) R Cash (United States) JJ Tracy	6^{5}	6	[10]
(United States) M Kiger (United States) E Spizzirri	7^{7}	1	[7]
3	(Australia) B Bayldon (United States) T Hilderbrand	w/o
(Australia) O Jasika (Australia) B Tomic
(Mexico) H Hach Verdugo (Colombia) C Rodríguez	6^{4}	7	[10]
4	(India) N Kaliyanda Poonacha (India) J Nedunchezhiyan	7^{7}	5	[6]
(Japan) Y Watanuki (Japan) T Yuzuki	1	3
2	(India) A Chandrasekar (United States) R Stalder	6	6

Semifinals
1/WC	(United States) R Cash (United States) JJ Tracy	6	7^{9}
3	(Australia) B Bayldon (United States) T Hilderbrand	4	6^{7}
(Mexico) H Hach Verdugo (Colombia) C Rodríguez	6	6^{6}	[13]
2	(India) A Chandrasekar (United States) R Stalder	2	7^{8}	[11]

Final
1/WC	(United States) R Cash (United States) JJ Tracy	7^{7}	6
(Mexico) H Hach Verdugo (Colombia) C Rodríguez	6^{3}	3
