= 2017 LTP Charleston Pro Tennis – Doubles =

Doubles
- 2017 LTP Charleston Pro Tennis

Final
- Champion: (United States) Emina Bektas (Chile) Alexa Guarachi
- Runner-up: (United States) Kaitlyn Christian (United States) Sabrina Santamaria
- Score: 5–7, 6–3, [10–5]

Events
| Singles | Doubles |
| LTP Charleston Pro Tennis | · 2018 → |

This was a new event in the 2017 ITF Women's Circuit.

Emina Bektas and Alexa Guarachi won the title, defeating Kaitlyn Christian and Sabrina Santamaria in the final, 5–7, 6–3, [10–5].

== Seeds ==
1. (United States) Ashley Weinhold / (United States) Caitlin Whoriskey (first round)
2. (United States) Sanaz Marand / (United States) Keri Wong (first round)
3. (Norway) Ulrikke Eikeri / (Mexico) Renata Zarazúa (quarterfinals)
4. (Serbia) Jovana Jakšić / (Bulgaria) Elitsa Kostova (first round)

== Draw ==
=== Key ===
- Q = Qualifier
- WC = Wild card
- LL = Lucky loser
- Alt = Alternate
- ITF = ITF entry
- PR = Protected ranking
- SR = Special ranking
- SE = Special exempt
- JE = Junior exempt
- JR = Junior Accelerator Programme entrant
- CO = College Accelerator Programme entrant
- NG = Next Gen Accelerator Program entrant
- w/o = Walkover
- r = Retired
- d = Defaulted

First round
1 | (United States) A Weinhold (United States) C Whoriskey | 7^{7} | 2 | [7]
(United States) E Halbauer (United States) S Kenin | 6^{4} | 6 | [10]
(Bulgaria) D Evtimova (Austria) P König | 3 | 6 | [10]
(Canada) F Abanda (United States) M Sanchez | 6 | 4 | [5]
3 | (Norway) U Eikeri (Mexico) R Zarazúa | 6 | 5 | [10]
(Ukraine) E Ianchuk (Kazakhstan) K Kerimbayeva | 3 | 7 | [8]
WC | (United States) YK Chiang (United States) E Navarro | 6 | 1 | [7]
(United States) K Christian (United States) S Santamaria | 3 | 6 | [10]
WC | (United States) UM Arconada (United States) A Kratzer | 6^{4} | 3
(United States) A Mueller (United States) J Wacnik | 7^{7} | 6
(United States) E Bektas (Chile) A Guarachi | 6 | 6
4 | (Serbia) J Jakšić (Bulgaria) E Kostova | 1 | 2
(United States) K Day (United States) C Dolehide | 6 | 6
WC | (United States) M Brengle (United States) D Collins | 2 | 3
(Canada) C Robillard-Millette (Canada) C Zhao | 6 | 6
2 | (United States) S Marand (United States) K Wong | 0 | 2

Quarterfinals
(United States) E Halbauer (United States) S Kenin | 6 | 6
(Bulgaria) D Evtimova (Austria) P König | 4 | 2
3 | (Norway) U Eikeri (Mexico) R Zarazúa | 4 | 4
(United States) K Christian (United States) S Santamaria | 6 | 6
(United States) A Mueller (United States) J Wacnik | 1 | 4
(United States) E Bektas (Chile) A Guarachi | 6 | 6
(United States) K Day (United States) C Dolehide | 6 | 4 | [5]
(Canada) C Robillard-Millette (Canada) C Zhao | 3 | 6 | [10]

Semifinals
(United States) E Halbauer (United States) S Kenin | 5 | 3
(United States) K Christian (United States) S Santamaria | 7 | 6
(United States) E Bektas (Chile) A Guarachi | 2 | 6 | [10]
(Canada) C Robillard-Millette (Canada) C Zhao | 6 | 1 | [8]

Final
(United States) K Christian (United States) S Santamaria | 7 | 3 | [5]
(United States) E Bektas (Chile) A Guarachi | 5 | 6 | [10]
