= 2024 Edmond Open – Singles =

Singles
- 2024 Edmond Open

Final
- Champion: (United States) Mary Stoiana
- Runner-up: (United States) Alana Smith
- Score: 7–5, 6–3

Events
Singles	Doubles
Edmond Open	· 2025 →

This was the first edition of the tournament.

Mary Stoiana won the title, defeating Alana Smith 7–5, 6–3 in the final.

== Seeds ==
1. (Italy) Lucrezia Stefanini (first round)
2. (United States) Kayla Day (second round)
3. (Thailand) Lanlana Tararudee (second round)
4. Anastasia Tikhonova (quarterfinals)
5. (United States) Elizabeth Mandlik (quarterfinals)
6. (United States) Maria Mateas (first round)
7. (Ukraine) Valeriya Strakhova (quarterfinals)
8. (United States) Sophie Chang (second round)

== Draw ==
=== Key ===
- Q = Qualifier
- WC = Wild card
- LL = Lucky loser
- Alt = Alternate
- ITF = ITF entry
- PR = Protected ranking
- SR = Special ranking
- SE = Special exempt
- JE = Junior exempt
- JR = Junior Accelerator Programme entrant
- CO = College Accelerator Programme entrant
- NG = Next Gen Accelerator Program entrant
- w/o = Walkover
- r = Retired
- d = Defaulted

=== Finals ===
Semifinals
WC	(United States) Mary Stoiana	6	7
JE	(Ukraine) Anastasiya Lopata	3	5
Q	(United States) Alana Smith	4
(Canada) Victoria Mboko	1^{r}

Final
WC	(United States) Mary Stoiana	7	6
Q	(United States) Alana Smith	5	3

=== Top half ===
First round
1	(Italy) L Stefanini	1	3
Q	(Czech Republic) D Vidmanová	6	6
Q	(United States) R McAdoo	2	4
Q	(China) H Jiangxue	6	6
WC	(United States) M Stoiana	6	6
(United States) A Kiick	1	1
Q	(Peru) L Pérez Alarcón	4	5
8	(United States) S Chang	6	7
3	(Thailand) L Tararudee	6	6
WC	(Slovenia) K Novak	1	1
(United States) M Sieg	2	1
JE	(Ukraine) A Lopata	6	6
(United States) H Inoue	6	7^{9}
(United States) V Hu	1	6^{7}
WC	(United States) J DeFalco	1	7^{7}	4
7	(Ukraine) V Strakhova	6	6^{4}	6

Second round
Q	(Czech Republic) D Vidmanová	6	7
Q	(China) H Jiangxue	1	5
WC	(United States) M Stoiana	6	6
8	(United States) S Chang	4	2
3	(Thailand) L Tararudee	2	2
JE	(Ukraine) A Lopata	6	6
(United States) H Inoue	6^{2}	5
7	(Ukraine) V Strakhova	7^{7}	7

Quarterfinals
Q	(Czech Republic) D Vidmanová	4	6	5
WC	(United States) M Stoiana	6	4	7
JE	(Ukraine) A Lopata	6	4	6
7	(Ukraine) V Strakhova	1	6	0

Semifinals
WC	(United States) M Stoiana	6	7
JE	(Ukraine) A Lopata	3	5

=== Bottom half ===
First round
6	(United States) M Mateas	2	6	5
Q	(United States) A Smith	6	2	7
(Poland) K Kawa	3	6	3
(Slovakia) V Hrunčáková	6	3	6
Q	M Kononova	3	1
(Australia) J Fourlis	6	6
(United States) E Kalieva	6	3	3
4	A Tikhonova	3	6	6
5	(United States) E Mandlik	6	6
M Kozyreva	0	1
Q	(Slovakia) M Okáľová	2	3
(United States) K Scott	6	6
WC	(United States) I Jovic	7	2	6^{3}
(Canada) V Mboko	5	6	7^{7}
Q	(Peru) D Guzmán	5	4
2	(United States) K Day	7	6

Second round
Q	(United States) A Smith	6	7^{7}
(Slovakia) V Hrunčáková	2	6^{2}
(Australia) J Fourlis	5	6	0
4	A Tikhonova	7	3	6
5	(United States) E Mandlik	7	6
(United States) K Scott	5	2
(Canada) V Mboko	6	6
2	(United States) K Day	4	2

Quarterfinals
Q	(United States) A Smith	6	6
4	A Tikhonova	2	3
5	(United States) E Mandlik	6^{7}	4
(Canada) V Mboko	7^{9}	6

Semifinals
Q	(United States) A Smith	4
(Canada) V Mboko	1^{r}
