= 2020 LTP Charleston Pro Tennis – Singles =

Singles
- 2020 LTP Charleston Pro Tennis

Final
- Champion: (Egypt) Mayar Sherif
- Runner-up: (Poland) Katarzyna Kawa
- Score: 6–2, 6–3

Events
Singles	Doubles
← 2019 ·	LTP Charleston Pro Tennis	· 2021 →

Taylor Townsend was the defending champion, but chose not to participate as she is on maternity leave.

Mayar Sherif won the title, defeating Katarzyna Kawa in the final, 6–2, 6–3.

== Seeds ==
1. (United States) Shelby Rogers (second round, withdrew)
2. (United States) Lauren Davis (quarterfinals)
3. (United States) Madison Brengle (second round)
4. (Japan) Misaki Doi (semifinals, retired)
5. (Spain) Aliona Bolsova (first round)
6. (United States) Kristie Ahn (first round)
7. (Germany) Anna-Lena Friedsam (first round)
8. (United States) Ann Li (quarterfinals)

== Draw ==
=== Key ===
- Q = Qualifier
- WC = Wild card
- LL = Lucky loser
- Alt = Alternate
- SE = Special exempt
- PR = Protected ranking
- ITF = ITF entry
- JE = Junior exempt
- w/o = Walkover
- r = Retired
- d = Defaulted
- SR = Special ranking

=== Finals ===
Semifinals
Q	(Egypt) Mayar Sherif	3	6	4
4	(Japan) Misaki Doi	6	3	3^{r}
(Mexico) Renata Zarazúa	4	3
(Poland) Katarzyna Kawa	6	6

Final
Q	(Egypt) Mayar Sherif	6	6
(Poland) Katarzyna Kawa	2	3

=== Top half ===
First round
1	(United States) S Rogers	6	4	7^{7}
Q	(Japan) K Okamura	2	6	6^{5}
(United States) F Di Lorenzo	6^{5}	1
Q	(Romania) G Talabă	7^{7}	6
(Slovakia) K Kučová	2	1
Q	(Egypt) M Sherif	6	6
(United States) C Dolehide	6	6
6	(United States) K Ahn	1	0
4	(Japan) M Doi	6	6
WC	(United States) R Montgomery	3	2
(Italy) S Errani	6	6
(United States) C McNally	3	4
Q	(Poland) M Fręch	4	7	6
Q	(United States) B Mattek-Sands	6	5	3
(United States) W Osuigwe	3	2
8	(United States) A Li	6	6

Second round
1	(United States) S Rogers
Q	(Romania) G Talabă	w/o
Q	(Egypt) M Sherif	7	7^{8}
(United States) C Dolehide	5	6^{6}
4	(Japan) M Doi	w/o
(Italy) S Errani
Q	(Poland) M Fręch	6	4	2
8	(United States) A Li	4	6	6

Quarterfinals
Q	(Romania) G Talabă	6	3	1
Q	(Egypt) M Sherif	3	6	6
4	(Japan) M Doi	6	7^{8}
8	(United States) A Li	3	6^{6}

Semifinals
Q	(Egypt) M Sherif	3	6	4
4	(Japan) M Doi	6	3	3^{r}

=== Bottom half ===
First round
7	(Germany) A-L Friedsam	7^{7}	4	3
WC	(United States) E Navarro	6^{4}	6	6
Q	(United States) C Liu	6^{1}	7	6
JE	(France) D Parry	7^{7}	5	1
(Mexico) R Zarazúa	6	6
Q	(Ukraine) K Bondarenko	3	1
(Belarus) O Govortsova	4	3
3	(United States) M Brengle	6	6
5	(Spain) A Bolsova	6^{0}	0
WC	(United States) C Bellis	7^{7}	6
WC	(United States) K Shaffer	6	2	4
(Poland) K Kawa	0	6	6
Q	(United States) H Baptiste	6	7^{7}
(Australia) A Sharma	2	6^{3}
(Belgium) G Minnen	3	3
2	(United States) L Davis	6	6

Second round
WC	(United States) E Navarro	4	1
Q	(United States) C Liu	6	6
(Mexico) R Zarazúa	6	6
3	(United States) M Brengle	2	1
WC	(United States) C Bellis	6^{4}	4
(Poland) K Kawa	7^{7}	6
Q	(United States) H Baptiste	2	1
2	(United States) L Davis	6	6

Quarterfinals
Q	(United States) C Liu	3	6^{2}
(Mexico) R Zarazúa	6	7^{7}
(Poland) K Kawa	6	6
2	(United States) L Davis	3	3

Semifinals
(Mexico) R Zarazúa	4	3
(Poland) K Kawa	6	6
