= Edmond Open =

- 2025 Edmond Open

Women's World Tennis Tour
- Event name: Edmond Open
- Location: Edmond, Oklahoma, United States
- Venue: Edmond Center Court
- Category: ITF Women's World Tennis Tour
- Surface: Hard
- Draw: 32S/32Q/16D
- Prize money: $100,000
- Website: Official website

The Edmond Open is a tournament for professional female tennis players played on outdoor hard courts. The event is classified as a $60,000 ITF Women's World Tennis Tour tournament and has been held in Edmond, Oklahoma, United States, since 2024.

== Past finals ==
=== Singles ===
Year	Champion	Runner-up	Score
2026	(United States) Sloane Stephens	Kristina Liutova	6–3, 6–2
2025	(United States) Elizabeth Mandlik	(Canada) Marina Stakusic	6–3, 7–5
2024	(United States) Mary Stoiana	(United States) Alana Smith	7–5, 6–3

=== Doubles ===
Year	Champions	Runners-up	Score
2026	(Spain) Alicia Herrero Liñana (United States) Allura Zamarripa	(United Kingdom) Sofia Johnson (United States) Malaika Rapolu	6–2, 6–2
2025	(Ukraine) Valeriya Strakhova; Anastasia Tikhonova	(Australia) Olivia Gadecki (Poland) Olivia Lincer	6–3, 6–7^{(2–7)}, [10–8]
2024	(United States) Kayla Day (Australia) Jaimee Fourlis	(United States) Sophie Chang (United States) Rasheeda McAdoo	7–5, 7–5
