= Olivia Lincer =

American tennis player (born 2004)

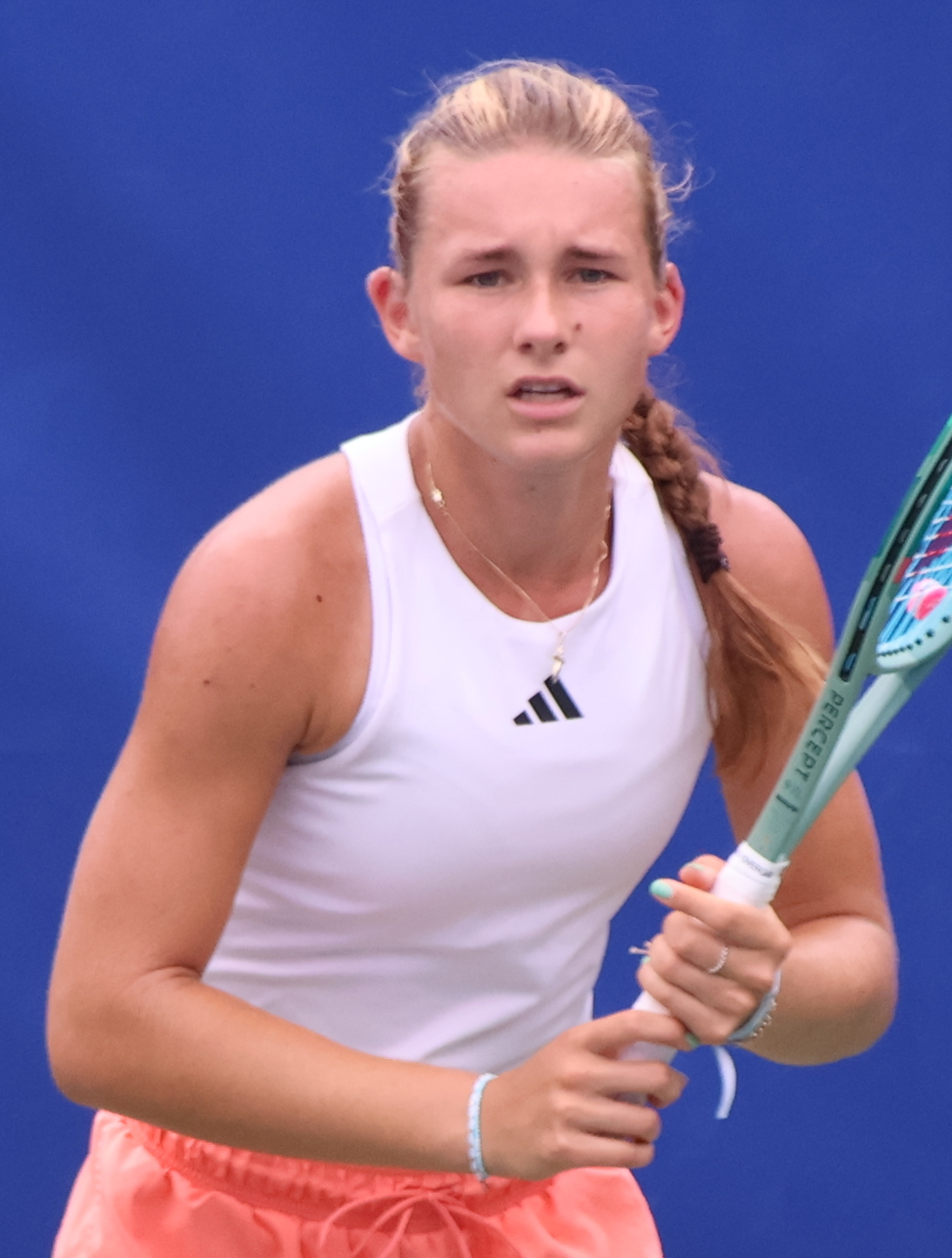
- Lincer in 2026
- Country (sports): United States; Poland (2022–2025)
- Born: December 17, 2004 (age 21)
- Height: 5 ft 9 in (175 cm)
- Plays: Right-handed (two-handed backhand)
- College: UCF (2023–2025); Oklahoma State (2025–2026); Texas A&M (2026–2027)
- Prize money: $53,992

Singles
- Career titles: 2 ITF
- Highest ranking: No. 405 (October 6, 2025)
- Current ranking: No. 673 (June 29, 2026)

Grand Slam singles results
- Wimbledon Junior: 3R (2022)

Doubles
- Highest ranking: No. 300 (October 27, 2025)
- Current ranking: No. 389 (June 29, 2026)

Grand Slam doubles results
- Wimbledon Junior: 2R (2022)
- Last updated on: June 29, 2026.

Olivia Lincer (born December 17, 2004) is an American college tennis player for the Texas A&M Aggies. She previously played for the UCF Knights and Oklahoma State Cowgirls. She has a career-high Women's Tennis Association (WTA) singles ranking of No. 405 and a career-high doubles ranking of No. 300, both reached in October 2025.

== Tennis career ==
=== Early life and juniors ===
Lincer grew up in Windsor, Connecticut, the daughter of Karina and Maciej "Magic" Lincer. Her father – a tennis pro from Poland – opened his own academy in Windsor when she was six, and her mother runs the academy. She has a younger sister, Karolina, who also plays tennis. She is of Polish descent through her father and Polish and Colombian descent through her mother. Though a natural lefty, Lincer learned to play right-handed. At age thirteen, she jumped to the 18s age group in United States Tennis Association (USTA) competitions and proved herself at that level, winning four consecutive New England Super Six tournaments. At sixteen, she was ranked as the top player in the United States under 18. She subsequently competed on the ITF Junior Circuit and reached a peak world junior ranking of No. 65.

Lincer debuted on the ITF Women's World Tennis Tour at age 16 in June 2021, earning a wildcard into the main draw at a W25 event in Santo Domingo, Dominican Republic. She lost in the first round to qualifier Joanne Züger. The following week, she partnered Madison Appel to earn her first professional win over Rasheeda McAdoo and Conny Perrin at the next W25 in Santo Domingo, but they lost in the next round to eventual champions Kelly Williford and Ana Carmen Zamburek. In November 2021, she reached her first professional final at a W15 event in Guatemala City, where she lost to top seed Hurricane Tyra Black.

In the spring of 2022, Lincer decided to start representing her father's country of Poland, making her the top-ranked junior from the country. Later that year, she made the only Grand Slam appearance of her junior career at the Wimbledon Championships, recording wins over Sara Saito and Johanne Svendsen to reach the third round in girls' singles, where she lost to fifth seed Victoria Mboko. She also reached the second round in girls' doubles with Renáta Jamrichová, losing to top seeds Nikola Bartůňková and Céline Naef. Ranked as a top five recruit in the national class of 2023, she committed to play college tennis at the University of Central Florida (UCF).

=== College years ===
In July 2023, Lincer earned a wildcard into her first WTA Tour qualifying draw at the WTA Poland Open, where she lost her opening match to Ankita Raina. The following month, she made her WTA 125 debut with a wildcard at the Polish Open, but lost in the first round to Emiliana Arango. In November 2023, she reached the doubles final at W25 Santo Domingo with fellow Polish player Anna Hertel, but the final (against two seeds Hiroko Kuwata and Rebeca Pereira) was not played due to poor weather.

Lincer joined the UCF Knights as a freshman in the spring of 2024. She primarily played at the number one and number three singles spots and finished her freshman campaign with a 7–10 singles record, good enough to be named the Big 12 Conference Freshman of the Year. In June 2024, she won her first professional title at W15 Santo Domingo, not dropping a set and defeating Katja Wiersholm in the final. In December 2024, she won her second title at W35 Santo Domingo after defeating top seed Carlota Martínez Círez in the final.

In the spring of 2025, Lincer posted a strong 15–2 record as a sophomore for the UCF Knights, playing mostly on court one and sometimes court two. At the end of her sophomore year, she was named the Big 12 Conference Player of the Year and was ranked in the top 100 in singles by the Intercollegiate Tennis Association (ITA). In July 2025, she became the first woman to win a professional tennis match in Newport, Rhode Island, since the 1990 Virginia Slims of Newport, defeating Anna Frey to qualify for the inaugural Hall of Fame Open main draw. She also earned her first WTA 125 win in the doubles draw in Newport, partnering a retiring Eugenie Bouchard to defeat Maria Mateas and Alana Smith in the first round. In October 2025, after three years representing Poland, she switched back to the United States, with her father citing a lack of support from the Polish Tennis Association.

After two seasons at UCF, Lincer transferred to the Oklahoma State Cowgirls for the spring of 2026. She ended her junior year with an 8–4 singles record at court one, earning second-team All-Big 12 honors. After one season at Oklahoma State, she transferred again to the reigning national champion Texas A&M Aggies.

== ITF Circuit finals ==
=== Singles: 3 (2 titles, 1 runner-up) ===
Legend W25/35 tournaments (1–0) W15 tournaments (1–1)	Finals by surface Hard (2–0) Clay (0–1)

Result	W–L	Date	Tournament	Tier	Surface	Opponent	Score
Loss	0–1	Nov 2021	ITF Guatemala City	W15	Clay	(United States) Hurricane Tyra Black	5–7, 3–6
Win	1–1	Jun 2024	ITF Santo Domingo, Dominican Rep.	W15	Hard	(Norway) Katja Wiersholm	7–6^{(4)}, 6–1
Win	1–2	Dec 2024	ITF Santo Domingo, Dominican Rep.	W35	Hard	(Spain) Carlota Martínez Círez	7–6^{(9)}, 3–6, 6–3

=== Doubles: 4 (1 titles, 3 runner-ups) ===
Legend W100 tournaments (0–1) W75 tournaments (1–0) W25/35 tournaments (0–2)	Finals by surface Hard (1–3)

Result	W–L	Date	Tournament	Tier	Surface	Partner	Opponents	Score
Finalist (Note: The match was not played due to poor weather.)	NP	Nov 2023	ITF Santo Domingo, Dominican Republic	W25	Hard	(Poland) Anna Hertel	(Japan) Hiroko Kuwata (Brazil) Rebeca Pereira	not played
Loss	0–1	Nov 2024	ITF Miami, United States	W35	Hard	(Morocco) Aya El Aouni	(Canada) Kayla Cross (United States) Anna Rogers	5–7, 4–6
Loss	0–2	Jan 2025	ITF Le Lamentin, France (Martinique)	W35	Hard	(United States) Clervie Ngounoue	(Canada) Cadence Brace (Canada) Victoria Mboko	2–6, 6–7^{(2)}
Loss	0–3	Oct 2025	Edmond Open, United States	W100	Hard	(Australia) Olivia Gadecki	(Ukraine) Valeriya Strakhova; Anastasia Tikhonova	3–6, 7–6^{(2)}, [8-10]
Win	1–3	Jul 2026	Championnats de Granby, Canada	W75	Hard	(United States) Kylie Collins	(Canada) Mia Kupres (Canada) Alexandra Vagramov	6–2, 6–2
