= Malaika Rapolu =

American tennis player (born 2003)

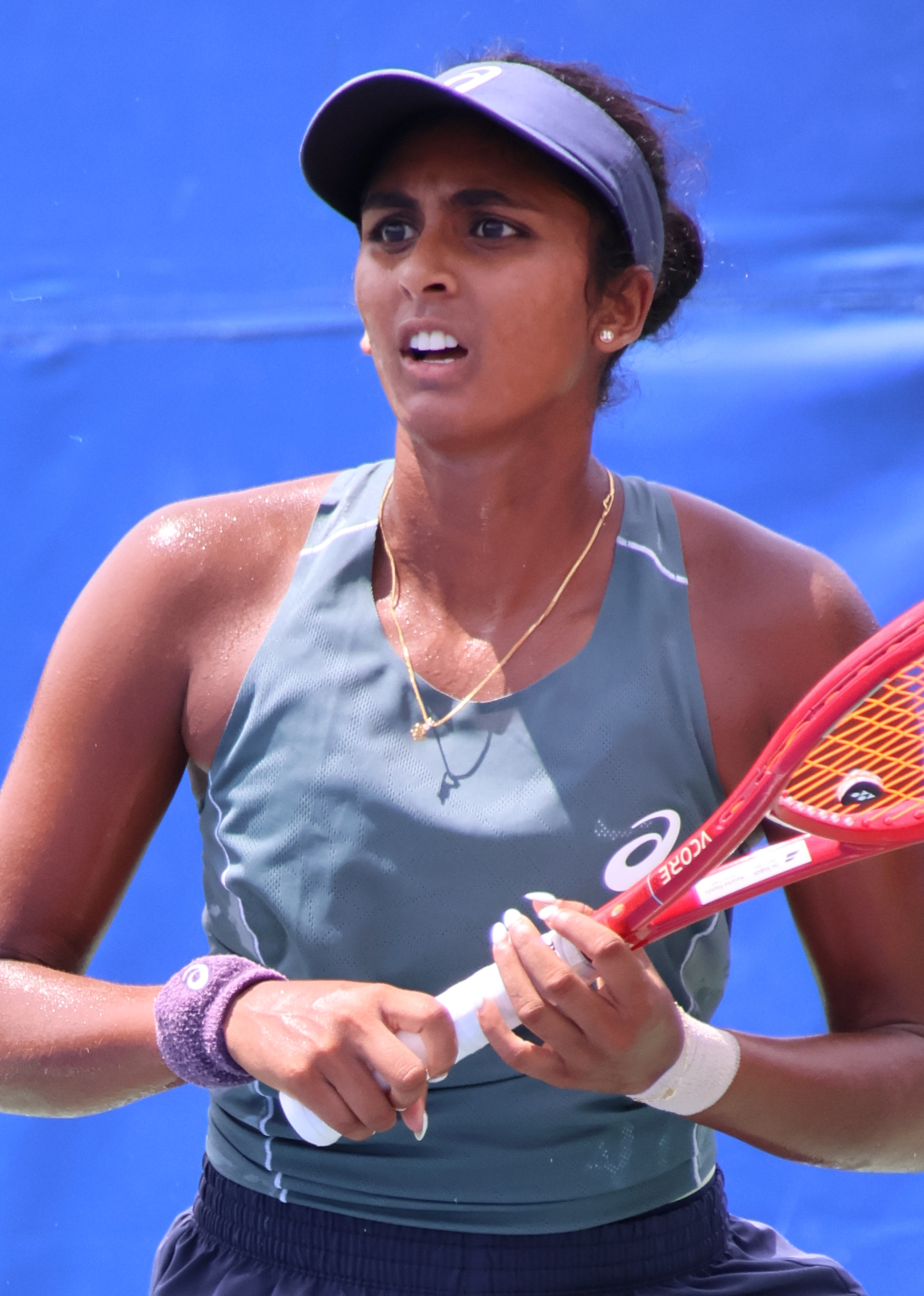
- Rapolu at the 2026 Cary Tennis Classic
- Country (sports): United States
- Born: April 18, 2003 (age 23) Cedar Park, Texas, US
- Plays: Right (two-handed backhand)
- College: Austin, Texas
- Prize money: $60,789

Singles
- Career record: 109–70
- Career titles: 4 ITF
- Highest ranking: No. 336 (August 3, 2026)
- Current ranking: No. 339 (August 10, 2026)

Doubles
- Career record: 31–35
- Career titles: 2 ITF
- Highest ranking: No. 658 (February 2, 2026)
- Current ranking: No. 680 (August 10, 2026)
- Last updated on: August 17, 2026.

Malaika Rapolu (born April 18, 2003) is an American professional tennis player. She has career-high rankings of 336 in singles, achieved on 3 August 2026, and 658 in doubles, attained in February 2026.

== Early life ==
Rapolu was born in Cedar Park, Texas. She began playing tennis at the age of seven, coached by her father, Madhuker. She attended Round Rock High School and was later homeschooled. She is of Indian descent.

== Career ==
=== College ===
In April 2020, Rapolu committed to play collegiate tennis for the Texas Longhorns. She played her final season in 2024.

=== Professional ===
In October 2024, Rapolu won back-to-back W15 titles in Huamantla. The following month, she won the W40 Women's Pro Tennis Open in Austin as a wildcard entrant. With her title in Austin, she rose 245 places in the WTA rankings to a career-high of No. 564 on 18 November.

In February 2025, she made her WTA Tour debut as a wildcard at the ATX Open, but lost in the first round to Nuria Párrizas Díaz.

== ITF Circuit finals ==
=== Singles: 8 (6 titles, 2 runner-ups) ===
Legend W50 tournaments (3–0) W35 tournaments (1–0) W15 tournaments (2–2)	Finals by surface Hard (6–2)

Result	W–L	Date	Tournament	Tier	Surface	Opponent	Score
Win	1–0	Oct 2024	ITF Huamantla, Mexico	W15	Hard	(Canada) Dasha Plekhanova	7–6^{(3)}, 7–5
Win	2–0	Oct 2024	ITF Huamantla, Mexico	W15	Hard	(Colombia) Yuliana Monroy	7–6^{(3)}, 6–2
Win	3–0	Nov 2024	ITF Austin, United States	W50	Hard	(United States) Karina Miller	6–4, 6–2
Loss	3–1	Mar 2025	ITF Trois-Rivières, Canada	W15	Hard (i)	(United Kingdom) Emily Appleton	3–6, 6–3, 3–6
Loss	3–2	Mar 2026	ITF Monastir, Tunisia	W15	Hard	(United Kingdom) Alicia Dudeney	6–7^{(4)}, 6–7^{(6)}
Win	4–2	Jul 2026	ITF Santa Fe, United States	W35	Hard	(United States) Hina Inoue	6–2, 6–0
Win	5–2	Oct 2026	ITF Morelia, Mexico	W50	Hard	Anastasia Tikhonova	6–4, 6–0
Win	6–2	Nov 2026	ITF Huamantla, Mexico	W50	Hard	(Italy) Diletta Cherubini	6–2, 6–3

=== Doubles: 6 (2 titles, 5 runner-ups) ===
Legend W100 tournaments (0–1) W50 tournaments (0–1) W15 tournaments (2–2)	Finals by surface Hard (2–3)

Result	W–L	Date	Tournament	Tier	Surface	Partner	Opponent	Score
Loss	0–1	Jun 2023	ITF San Diego, US	W15	Hard	(Ukraine) Anita Sahdiieva	(United States) Kimmi Hance (China) Tian Fangran	6–3, 1–6, [9–11]
Loss	0–2	Jun 2023	ITF San Diego, US	W15	Hard	(Ukraine) Anita Sahdiieva	(United States) Sara Daavettila (United States) Katherine Hui	6–7^{(4)}, 4–6
Win	1–2	Jul 2024	ITF Lakewood, US	W15	Hard	(Ukraine) Anita Sahdiieva	(United States) Carolyn Ansari (South Africa) Gabriella Broadfoot	6–4, 2–6, [10–8]
Win	2–2	Oct 2024	ITF Huamantla, Mexico	W15	Hard	(Estonia) Liisa Varul	(Mexico) Claudia Sofía Martínez (Mexico) Fernanda Navarro	7–6^{(4)}, 4–6, [10–7]
Loss	2–3	Sep 2025	ITF Évora, Portugal	W50	Hard	(Czech Republic) Gabriela Knutson	(United States) Catherine Harrison (United States) Ashley Lahey	1–6, 6–1, [8–10]
Loss	2–4	Oct 2026	Edmond Open, US	W100	Hard	(United Kingdom) Sofia Johnson	(Spain) Alicia Herrero Liñana (United States) Allura Zamarripa	1–6, 2–6
