= LTP Charleston Pro Tennis =

ITF Women's Tour
- Event name: Charleston
- Founded: 2021
- Abolished: 2024
- Location: Charleston, United States
- Venue: LTP Tennis
- Category: WTA 125 / ITF W100
- Surface: Clay (green)
- Prize money: $115,000 / $100,000
- Website: www.ltptennis.com

Current champions (2024)
- Singles: (Mexico) Renata Zarazúa
- Doubles: (Italy) Nuria Brancaccio (Spain) Leyre Romero Gormaz

The LTP Charleston Pro Tennis is a series of tennis tournaments held on outdoor clay courts at LTP Tennis in Charleston, South Carolina, United States. It has been held since 2015 and is part of the ITF Women's Circuit. In 2021 and 2024, it was an event of the WTA Challenger Tour.

== Past finals ==
=== Singles ===
Year	Category	Champion	Runner-up	Score
2024 (2)	WTA 125	(Mexico) Renata Zarazúa	(United States) Hanna Chang	6–1, 7–6^{(7–4)}
2024 (1)	WTA 125	(Italy) Elisabetta Cocciaretto	Diana Shnaider	6–3, 6–2
2023 (2)	ITF 100	(United States) Emma Navarro (2)	(Hungary) Panna Udvardy	6–1, 6–1
2023 (1)	ITF 100	(United States) Emma Navarro	(United States) Peyton Stearns	2–6, 6–2, 7–5
2022 (2)	ITF 100	(Canada) Carol Zhao	(Japan) Himeno Sakatsume	3–6, 6–4, 6–4
2022 (1)	ITF 100	(United States) Taylor Townsend (3)	(China) Wang Xiyu	6–3, 6–2
2021 (3)	WTA 125	(United States) Varvara Lepchenko	(United States) Jamie Loeb	7–6^{(7–4)}, 4–6, 6–4
2021 (2)	ITF 60	(Greece) Despina Papamichail	(Brazil) Gabriela Cé	1–6, 6–3, 6–3
2021 (1)	ITF 100	(United States) Claire Liu	(United States) Madison Brengle	6–2, 7–6^{(8–6)}
2020 (2)	cancelled due to the COVID-19 pandemic			
2020 (1)	ITF 100	(Egypt) Mayar Sherif	(Poland) Katarzyna Kawa	6–3, 6–2
2019 (2)	ITF 60	(United States) Caroline Dolehide	(United States) Grace Min	6–2, 6–7^{(5–7)}, 6–0
2019 (1)	ITF 100	(United States) Taylor Townsend (2)	(United States) Whitney Osuigwe	6–4, 6–4
2018 (2)	ITF 25	(Romania) Gabriela Talabă	(United States) Elizabeth Halbauer	6–4, 6–7^{(5–7)}, 6–2
2018 (1)	ITF 80	(United States) Taylor Townsend	(United States) Madison Brengle	6–0, 6–4
2017 (2)	ITF 15	(Czech Republic) Michaela Bayerlová	(Paraguay) Montserrat González	2–6, 6–3, 6–3
2017 (1)	ITF 60	(United States) Madison Brengle	(United States) Danielle Collins	4–6, 6–2, 6–3
2016	ITF 10	(United States) Nicole Coopersmith	(Brazil) Ingrid Martins	6–3, 6–4
2015	ITF 10	final cancelled due to bad weather		

=== Doubles ===
Year	Category	Champions	Runners-up	Score
2024 (2)	WTA 125	(Italy) Nuria Brancaccio (Spain) Leyre Romero Gormaz	(Canada) Kayla Cross (United States) Liv Hovde	7–6^{(8–6)}, 6–2
2024 (1)	WTA 125	(Australia) Olivia Gadecki (United Kingdom) Olivia Nicholls	(Italy) Sara Errani (Slovakia) Tereza Mihalíková	6–2, 6–1
2023 (2)	ITF 100	(United States) Hailey Baptiste (United States) Whitney Osuigwe	(Uzbekistan) Nigina Abduraimova (France) Carole Monnet	6–4, 3–6, [13–11]
2023 (1)	ITF 100	(United States) Sophie Chang (2) (United States) Angela Kulikov	(United States) Ashlyn Krueger (United States) Robin Montgomery	6–3, 6–4
2022 (2)	ITF 100	(United States) Alycia Parks (United States) Sachia Vickery	(Hungary) Tímea Babos (Mexico) Marcela Zacarías	6–4, 5–7, [10–5]
2022 (1)	ITF 100	(Poland) Katarzyna Kawa (Indonesia) Aldila Sutjiadi (2)	(United States) Sophie Chang (United States) Angela Kulikov	6–1, 6–4
2021 (3)	WTA 125	(Chinese Taipei) Liang En-shuo (Canada) Rebecca Marino	(New Zealand) Erin Routliffe (Indonesia) Aldila Sutjiadi	5–7, 7–5, [10–7]
2021 (2)	ITF 60	(Hungary) Fanny Stollár (Indonesia) Aldila Sutjiadi	(United States) Rasheeda McAdoo (United States) Peyton Stearns	6–0, 6–4
2021 (1)	ITF 100	(United States) Caty McNally (Australia) Storm Sanders	(Japan) Eri Hozumi (Japan) Miyu Kato	7–5, 4–6, [10–6]
2020 (2)	cancelled due to the COVID-19 pandemic			
2020 (1)	ITF 100	(Poland) Magdalena Fręch (Poland) Katarzyna Kawa	(Australia) Astra Sharma (Egypt) Mayar Sherif	4–6, 6–4, [10–2]
2019 (2)	ITF 60	(Kazakhstan) Anna Danilina (United States) Ingrid Neel	(Montenegro) Vladica Babić (United States) Caitlin Whoriskey	6–1, 6–1
2019 (1)	ITF 100	(United States) Asia Muhammad (United States) Taylor Townsend	(United States) Madison Brengle (United States) Lauren Davis	6–2, 6–2
2018 (2)	ITF 25	(United States) Sophie Chang (United States) Alexandra Mueller	(Chinese Taipei) Hsu Chieh-yu (Romania) Gabriela Talabă	6–4, 6–4
2018 (1)	ITF 80	(Chile) Alexa Guarachi (2) (New Zealand) Erin Routliffe (2)	(United States) Louisa Chirico (United States) Allie Kiick	6–1, 3–6, [10–5]
2017 (2)	ITF 15	(United States) Chloe Beck (United States) Emma Navarro	(Russia) Ksenia Kuznetsova (Spain) María Martínez Martínez	6–1, 6–4
2017 (1)	ITF 60	(United States) Emina Bektas (Chile) Alexa Guarachi	(United States) Kaitlyn Christian (United States) Sabrina Santamaria	5–7, 6–3, [10–5]
2016	ITF 10	(United States) Andie Daniell (Canada) Erin Routliffe	(United States) Quinn Gleason (United States) Whitney Kay	6–4, 6–2
2015	ITF 10	final cancelled due to bad weather		
