= Elizabeth Mandlik =

American tennis player

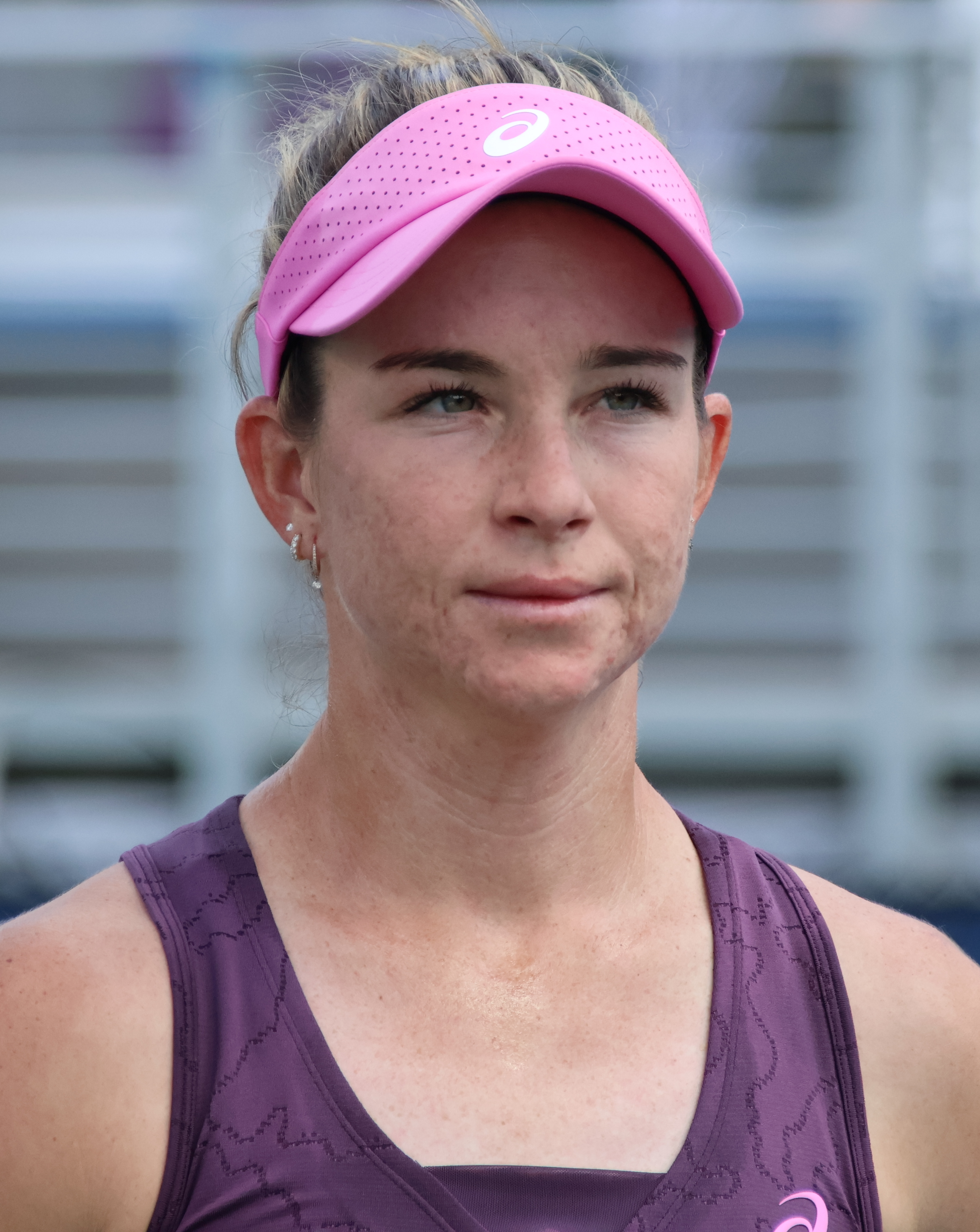
- Mandlik at the 2026 US Open
- Full name: Elizabeth Hana Mandlik
- Country (sports): United States
- Born: May 19, 2001 (age 25) Boca Raton, Florida, US
- Height: 5 ft 7 in (170 cm)
- Plays: Right-handed
- Coach: Emilio Sebastian Eguez Paz
- Prize money: US$ 996,777

Singles
- Career record: 211–166
- Career titles: 9 ITF
- Highest ranking: No. 97 (June 19, 2023)
- Current ranking: No. 165 (May 25, 2026)

Grand Slam singles results
- Australian Open: 1R (2023, 2026)
- French Open: 1R (2023)
- Wimbledon: Q2 (2023)
- US Open: 2R (2022)

Doubles
- Career record: 51–58
- Career titles: 3 ITF
- Highest ranking: No. 187 (November 7, 2022)
- Current ranking: No. 937 (May 25, 2026)

Grand Slam doubles results
- US Open: 1R (2022, 2023)
- Last updated on: May 26, 2026.

Elizabeth Hana Mandlik (born 19 May 2001) is an American tennis player. She is the daughter of former major champion Hana Mandlíková.

Mandlik has career-high rankings by the WTA of 97 in singles and 187 in doubles. She has won nine singles titles and three doubles titles on the ITF Circuit.

== Career ==
=== 2019: WTA Tour debut ===
Mandlik made her WTA Tour main-draw debut at the 2019 Luxembourg Open in the doubles tournament, partnering with Katie Volynets.

=== 2022: First WTA Tour match win, US Open debut ===
Ranked world No. 240, Mandlik qualified for the main-draw and earned her first WTA Tour tournament win at the Silicon Valley Classic, defeating Alison Riske-Amritraj in straight sets. In the second round, she took world No. 4 and second seed, Paula Badosa, to three sets, losing in a final set tiebreaker. As a result, she moved 60 positions into the top 200 in the rankings, at world No. 181.

Mandlik won the US Open Wildcard Challenge to enter the women's singles tournament where she made her major main-draw debut, 33 years after her mother last played at the event. Mandlíková became the first US Open women's singles champion in the Open Era to have a daughter also play the tournament. Mandlik played in the main-draw of the US Open, defeating Tamara Zidanšek in three sets, before losing to fifth seed and eventual finalist Ons Jabeur, in straight sets, in the second round.

=== 2023: Australian Open and top 100 debuts ===
Mandlik made her debut at the Australian Open as a lucky loser, but was defeated in the first round by 27th seed Irina-Camelia Begu. She reached her first WTA 125 singles final at the Catalonia Open, losing to Sorana Cîrstea in three sets.

Given a wildcard entry to make her WTA 1000 debut at Indian Wells, Mandlik defeated Alison Riske-Amritraj, before losing to 15th seed Petra Kvitová in the second round.

At the Nottingham Open, Mandlik qualified for the main-draw and defeated Viktoriya Tomova and seventh seed Camila Giorgi to make it through to the quarterfinals, where she lost to Alizé Cornet. As a result, she reached the top 100 in the singles rankings. She became the fifth American to reach this milestone and the ninth female player overall for the season.

=== 2024–2026: ITF Tour success, second Australian Open appearance ===
Mandlik qualified for the main draw of the 2024 Rosmalen Open, losing in the first round to wildcard entrant Céline Naef, in three sets. She also qualified for the main draw at the 2024 Mérida Open, but again was eliminated in the first round, this time by third seed Ajla Tomljanović in straight sets.

In October 2025, Mandlik won her biggest singles title to date at the W100 Edmond Open, defeating Marina Stakusic in the final. The win helped her clinch top spot in the USTA Wildcard Challenge for a place in the main draw at the 2026 Australian Open, at which she lost to Anna Bondár in the first round.

Mandlik made it through to her second WTA 125 singles final at the 2026 Cundinamarca Open, losing to third seed Bianca Andreescu in straight sets.

== Personal life ==
Mandlik is the daughter of Grand Slam champion Hana Mandlíková and granddaughter of an Olympic runner, Vilém Mandlík.

== Performance timelines ==
Key
W	F	SF	QF	#R	RR	Q#	P#	DNQ	A	Z#	PO	G	S	B	NMS	NTI	P	NH

(W) winner; (F) finalist; (SF) semifinalist; (QF) quarterfinalist; (#R) rounds 4, 3, 2, 1; (RR) round-robin stage; (Q#) qualification round; (P#) preliminary round; (DNQ) did not qualify; (A) absent; (Z#) Davis/Fed Cup Zonal Group (with number indication) or (PO) play-off; (G) gold, (S) silver or (B) bronze Olympic/Paralympic medal; (NMS) not a Masters tournament; (NTI) not a Tier I tournament; (P) postponed; (NH) not held; (SR) strike rate (events won / competed); (W–L) win–loss record.
To avoid confusion and double counting, these charts are updated at the conclusion of a tournament or when the player's participation has ended.

=== Singles ===
Tournament	2021	2022	2023	SR	W–L	Win %
Grand Slam tournaments
Australian Open	A	A	1R	0 / 1	0–1	0%
French Open	A	A	1R	0 / 1	0–1	0%
Wimbledon	A	A	Q2	0 / 0	0–0	–
US Open	Q1	2R	Q3	0 / 1	1–1	50%
Win–loss	0–0	1–1	0–2	0 / 3	1–3	25%
WTA 1000 tournaments
Qatar Open	NMS	A	NMS	0 / 0	0–0	–
Dubai Championships	A	NMS	A	0 / 0	0–0	–
Indian Wells Open	A	Q1	2R	0 / 1	1–1	50%
Miami Open	A	A	A	0 / 0	0–0	–
Madrid Open	A	A	Q2	0 / 0	0–0	–
Italian Open	A	A	Q1	0 / 0	0–0	–
Canadian Open	A	A	Q2	0 / 0	0–0	–
Cincinnati Open	A	A	A	0 / 0	0–0	–
Guadalajara Open	NH	Q1	A	0 / 0	0–0	–
Wuhan Open	not held			0 / 0	0–0	–
China Open	not held		A	0 / 0	0–0	–
Win–loss	0–0	0–0	1–1	0 / 1	1–1	50%
Career statistics
	2021	2022	2023	SR	W–L	Win %
Tournaments	0	3	7	Career total: 10		
Titles	0	0	0	Career total: 0		
Finals	0	0	0	Career total: 0		
Hard win–loss	0–0	2–3	3–5	0 / 8	5–8	38%
Clay win–loss	0–0	0–0	0–1	0 / 1	0–1	0%
Grass win–loss	0–0	0–0	2–1	0 / 1	2–1	67%
Overall win–loss^{1}	0–0	2–3	5–7	0 / 10	7–10	41%
Win %	–	40%	42%	Career total: 41%		
Year-end ranking (Note: 2019: WTA ranking–514, 2020: WTA ranking–545.)	504	119	127	$576,839		

== WTA 125 finals ==
=== Singles: 2 (runner-ups) ===
Result	W–L	Date	Tournament	Surface	Opponent	Score
Loss	0–1	May 2023	Catalonia Open, Spain	Clay	(Romania) Sorana Cîrstea	1–6, 6–4, 6–7^{(1–7)}
Loss	0–2	Nov 2026	Cundinamarca Open, Colombia	Clay	(Canada) Bianca Andreescu	3–6, 3–6

=== Doubles: 1 (runner-up) ===
Result	W–L	Date	Tournament	Surface	Partner	Opponents	Score
Loss	0–1	Oct 2022	Abierto Tampico, Mexico	Hard	(United States) Ashlyn Krueger	(Slovakia) Tereza Mihalíková (Indonesia) Aldila Sutjiadi	5–7, 2–6

== ITF Circuit finals ==
=== Singles: 12 (9 titles, 3 runner-ups) ===
Legend W100 tournaments (1–2) W25/35 tournaments (4–0) W15 tournaments (4–1)	Finals by surface Hard (7–3) Clay (2–0)

Result	W–L	Date	Tournament	Tier	Surface	Opponent	Score
Win	1–0	Mar 2019	ITF Carson, United States	W15	Hard	(Canada) Carson Branstine	6–2, 2–6, 6–4
Loss	1–1	Mar 2019	ITF Arcadia, United States	W15	Hard	(United States) Hanna Chang	5–7, 1–6
Win	2–1	May 2019	ITF Barletta, Italy	W15	Clay	(Romania) Oana Georgeta Simion	6–0, 6–2
Win	3–1	Jun 2021	ITF Monastir, Tunisia	W15	Hard	(Italy) Angelica Raggi	0–6, 6–2, 6–4
Win	4–1	Jul 2021	ITF Monastir, Tunisia	W15	Hard	(Italy) Angelica Raggi	6–3, 4–6, 6–0
Win	5–1	Jan 2022	ITF Florianópolis, Brazil	W25	Hard	(Chile) Barbara Gatica	6–0, 6–4
Win	6–1	Jan 2022	ITF Florianópolis, Brazil	W25	Hard	(Netherlands) Eva Vedder	6–3, 6–4
Win	7–1	Jun 2022	ITF Wichita, United States	W25	Hard	(United States) Kayla Day	6–3, 6–3
Loss	7–2	Aug 2022	Landisville Tennis Challenge, US	W100	Hard	(China) Zhu Lin	2–6, 3–6
Win	8–2	Jan 2025	ITF Palm Coast, United States	W35	Clay	(United States) Whitney Osuigwe	6–1, 6–7^{(4)}, 6–3
Win	9–2	Oct 2025	Edmond Open, United States	W100	Hard	(Canada) Marina Stakusic	6–3, 7–5
Loss	9–3	Jan 2026	San Diego Open, United States	W100	Hard	(United States) Elvina Kalieva	6–3, 3–6, 1–6

=== Doubles: 5 (3 titles, 2 runner-ups) ===
Legend W60/75 tournaments (0–2) W25 tournaments (2–0) W15 tournaments (1–0)	Finals by surface Hard (1–1) Clay (2–1)

Result	W–L	Date	Tournament	Tier	Surface	Partner	Opponents	Score
Win	1–0	Jul 2018	ITF Curtea de Argeș, Romania	W15	Clay	(Romania) Andreea Mitu	(Italy) Anna Turati (Italy) Bianca Turati	6–4, 7–5
Win	2–0	Oct 2021	ITF Pretoria, South Africa	W25	Hard	(Russia) Amina Anshba	(Switzerland) Jenny Dürst (Switzerland) Nina Stadler	6–2, 6–2
Win	3–0	Nov 2021	ITF Naples, United States	W25	Clay	(United States) Hanna Chang	(Chinese Taipei) Hsu Chieh-yu (Indonesia) Jessy Rompies	6–4, 1–6, [10–7]
Loss	3–1	May 2022	ITF Orlando Pro, US	W60	Hard	(United States) Hanna Chang	(United States) Sophie Chang (United States) Angela Kulikov	3–6, 6–2, [6–10]
Loss	3–2	Apr 2025	Bellinzona Ladies Open, Switzerland	W75	Clay	(Switzerland) Jenny Dürst	(Czech Republic) Aneta Kučmová (Greece) Sapfo Sakellaridi	6–7^{(3)}, 6–3, [2–10]
