= 2022 ITF Women's World Tennis Tour (April–June) =

The 2022 ITF Women's World Tennis Tour is the 2022 edition of the second-tier tour for women's professional tennis. It is organised by the International Tennis Federation and is a tier below the WTA Tour. The ITF Women's World Tennis Tour includes tournaments in five categories with prize money ranging from $15,000 up to $100,000.

== Key ==
Category
W100 tournaments
W80 tournaments
W60 tournaments
W25 tournaments
W15 tournaments

== Month ==
=== April ===
Week of	Tournament	Winner	Runners-up	Semifinalists	Quarterfinalists
April 4	Oeiras Ladies Open; Oeiras, Portugal; Clay; W80; Singles – Doubles	(Italy) Elisabetta Cocciaretto; 7–6^{(7–5)}, 2–6, 7–5	(Bulgaria) Viktoriya Tomova	Yuliya Hatouka (Hungary) Dalma Gálfi	(Romania) Andreea Mitu (France) Fiona Ferro (Serbia) Natalija Stevanović; Anna Blinkova
April 4	Oeiras Ladies Open; Oeiras, Portugal; Clay; W80; Singles – Doubles	(Poland) Katarzyna Piter (Belgium) Kimberley Zimmermann; 6–1, 6–1	(Germany) Katharina Gerlach (Serbia) Natalija Stevanović	Yuliya Hatouka (Hungary) Dalma Gálfi	(Romania) Andreea Mitu (France) Fiona Ferro (Serbia) Natalija Stevanović; Anna Blinkova
April 4	Tuks International; Pretoria, South Africa; Hard; W25; Singles and doubles draws	(Hong Kong) Eudice Chong vs TBD; Singles and doubles competition were abandoned due to ongoing poor weather		(South Africa) Isabella Kruger (Hong Kong) Cody Wong; Valeria Savinykh	(France) Tessah Andrianjafitrimo (Poland) Urszula Radwańska (Hungary) Tímea Babos; Irina Khromacheva
April 4	Tuks International; Pretoria, South Africa; Hard; W25; Singles and doubles draws	(Hong Kong) Eudice Chong / (Hong Kong) Cody Wong vs (United States) Anna Rogers / (United States) Christina Rosca		(South Africa) Isabella Kruger (Hong Kong) Cody Wong; Valeria Savinykh	(France) Tessah Andrianjafitrimo (Poland) Urszula Radwańska (Hungary) Tímea Babos; Irina Khromacheva
April 4	Chiang Rai, Thailand; Hard; W25; Singles and doubles draws	(Philippines) Alex Eala; 6–4, 6–2	(Thailand) Luksika Kumkhum	(Japan) Erika Sema (China) Ma Yexin	(Netherlands) Indy de Vroome (Japan) Hiroko Kuwata (Japan) Momoko Kobori (Hong Kong) Wu Ho-ching
April 4	Chiang Rai, Thailand; Hard; W25; Singles and doubles draws	(Japan) Kyōka Okamura (Thailand) Peangtarn Plipuech; 4–6, 6–3, [10–5]	(China) Ma Yexin (China) Xun Fangying	(Japan) Erika Sema (China) Ma Yexin	(Netherlands) Indy de Vroome (Japan) Hiroko Kuwata (Japan) Momoko Kobori (Hong Kong) Wu Ho-ching
April 4	Sharm El Sheikh, Egypt; Hard; W15; Singles and doubles draws	(China) Liu Fangzhou; 6–2, 7–6^{(7–5)}	(China) Yang Yidi	(Chinese Taipei) Lee Ya-hsuan (United States) Dasha Ivanova	(Japan) Chihiro Takayama (Japan) Hiromi Abe (Romania) Briana Szabó (Switzerland) Bojana Klincov
April 4	Sharm El Sheikh, Egypt; Hard; W15; Singles and doubles draws	(Netherlands) Gabriella Mujan (Mexico) María Fernanda Navarro; 6–3, 7–5	(United States) Dasha Ivanova (Netherlands) Stéphanie Visscher	(Chinese Taipei) Lee Ya-hsuan (United States) Dasha Ivanova	(Japan) Chihiro Takayama (Japan) Hiromi Abe (Romania) Briana Szabó (Switzerland) Bojana Klincov
April 4	Monastir, Tunisia; Hard; W15; Singles and doubles draws	(Chinese Taipei) Joanna Garland; 7–5, 6–1	(Hungary) Rebeka Stolmár	(France) Yasmine Mansouri (France) Nahia Berecoechea	(Slovakia) Eszter Méri (France) Nina Radovanovic (Netherlands) Jasmijn Gimbrère (France) Evita Ramirez
April 4	Monastir, Tunisia; Hard; W15; Singles and doubles draws	(China) Wang Meiling (China) Yao Xinxin; 6–2, 4–6, [10–3]	(France) Victoria Muntean (Hungary) Rebeka Stolmár	(France) Yasmine Mansouri (France) Nahia Berecoechea	(Slovakia) Eszter Méri (France) Nina Radovanovic (Netherlands) Jasmijn Gimbrère (France) Evita Ramirez
April 4	Antalya, Turkey; Clay; W15; Singles and doubles draws	Mirra Andreeva; 6–7^{(6–8)}, 6–0, 6–2	(Italy) Martina Colmegna	(Belgium) Hanne Vandewinkel (Greece) Sapfo Sakellaridi	(Estonia) Maileen Nuudi; Julia Avdeeva (Estonia) Elena Malõgina (Italy) Deborah Chiesa
April 4	Antalya, Turkey; Clay; W15; Singles and doubles draws	Vlada Koval (Bulgaria) Gergana Topalova; 7–6^{(11–9)}, 6–2	Ksenia Laskutova (Greece) Sapfo Sakellaridi	(Belgium) Hanne Vandewinkel (Greece) Sapfo Sakellaridi	(Estonia) Maileen Nuudi; Julia Avdeeva (Estonia) Elena Malõgina (Italy) Deborah Chiesa
April 11	U.S. Pro Women's Clay Court Championships; Palm Harbor, United States; Clay; W100; Singles – Doubles	(United States) Katie Volynets; 6–4, 6–3	(China) Wang Xiyu	(United States) Louisa Chirico (Romania) Irina Bara	(United States) Sophie Chang (Romania) Gabriela Lee (United States) Grace Min (United States) Taylor Townsend
April 11	U.S. Pro Women's Clay Court Championships; Palm Harbor, United States; Clay; W100; Singles – Doubles	(United States) Sophie Chang (United States) Angela Kulikov; 6–4, 3–6, [10–8]	(Romania) Irina Bara (Italy) Lucrezia Stefanini	(United States) Louisa Chirico (Romania) Irina Bara	(United States) Sophie Chang (Romania) Gabriela Lee (United States) Grace Min (United States) Taylor Townsend
April 11	Bellinzona Ladies Open; Bellinzona, Switzerland; Clay; W60; Singles – Doubles	(Cyprus) Raluca Șerban; 6–3, 6–0	(Georgia (country)) Ekaterine Gorgodze	(Bosnia and Herzegovina) Dea Herdželaš; Anna Blinkova	Erika Andreeva (Slovenia) Polona Hercog (Switzerland) Simona Waltert (France) Alice Ramé
April 11	Bellinzona Ladies Open; Bellinzona, Switzerland; Clay; W60; Singles – Doubles	(United Kingdom) Alicia Barnett (United Kingdom) Olivia Nicholls; 6–7^{(7–9)}, 6–4, [10–7]	(Switzerland) Xenia Knoll; Oksana Selekhmeteva	(Bosnia and Herzegovina) Dea Herdželaš; Anna Blinkova	Erika Andreeva (Slovenia) Polona Hercog (Switzerland) Simona Waltert (France) Alice Ramé
April 11	Calvi, France; Hard; W25+H; Singles and doubles draws	(France) Léolia Jeanjean; 6–2, 6–2	(France) Tessah Andrianjafitrimo	(Latvia) Kamilla Bartone (Ukraine) Daria Snigur	Ekaterina Makarova (Poland) Weronika Falkowska (France) Audrey Albié (France) Estelle Cascino
April 11	Calvi, France; Hard; W25+H; Singles and doubles draws	Sofya Lansere (Ukraine) Valeriya Strakhova; 6–4, 7–6^{(7–5)}	(France) Estelle Cascino (France) Jessika Ponchet	(Latvia) Kamilla Bartone (Ukraine) Daria Snigur	Ekaterina Makarova (Poland) Weronika Falkowska (France) Audrey Albié (France) Estelle Cascino
April 11	Santa Margherita di Pula, Italy; Clay; W25; Singles and doubles draws	(Netherlands) Eva Vedder; 6–2, 6–3	(North Macedonia) Lina Gjorcheska	Darya Astakhova (Croatia) Tena Lukas	(Italy) Anna Turati (Romania) Cristina Dinu (Switzerland) Lulu Sun (Hungary) Tímea Babos
April 11	Santa Margherita di Pula, Italy; Clay; W25; Singles and doubles draws	(North Macedonia) Lina Gjorcheska (Netherlands) Eva Vedder; 7–5, 6–2	(Croatia) Lea Bošković (Croatia) Tena Lukas	Darya Astakhova (Croatia) Tena Lukas	(Italy) Anna Turati (Romania) Cristina Dinu (Switzerland) Lulu Sun (Hungary) Tímea Babos
April 11	Oeiras, Portugal; Clay; W25; Singles and doubles draws	Diana Shnaider; 6–4, 6–2	(Italy) Martina Di Giuseppe	(Germany) Katharina Gerlach (Italy) Giulia Gatto-Monticone	(Spain) Lucía Cortez Llorca (Spain) Jéssica Bouzas Maneiro; Iryna Shymanovich; Yuliya Hatouka
April 11	Oeiras, Portugal; Clay; W25; Singles and doubles draws	(Spain) Jéssica Bouzas Maneiro (Spain) Guiomar Maristany; 3–6, 6–4, [10–8]	(Portugal) Francisca Jorge (Portugal) Matilde Jorge	(Germany) Katharina Gerlach (Italy) Giulia Gatto-Monticone	(Spain) Lucía Cortez Llorca (Spain) Jéssica Bouzas Maneiro; Iryna Shymanovich; Yuliya Hatouka
April 11	Chiang Rai, Thailand; Hard; W25; Singles and doubles draws	(Thailand) Luksika Kumkhum; 6–3, 6–3	(Thailand) Peangtarn Plipuech	(Japan) Erika Sema (China) Lu Jiajing	(Philippines) Alex Eala (Japan) Kyōka Okamura (Thailand) Pimrada Jattavapornvanit (Kazakhstan) Gozal Ainitdinova
April 11	Chiang Rai, Thailand; Hard; W25; Singles and doubles draws	(Kazakhstan) Gozal Ainitdinova; Maria Timofeeva; 2–6, 7–5, [10–4]	(Japan) Momoko Kobori (Thailand) Luksika Kumkhum	(Japan) Erika Sema (China) Lu Jiajing	(Philippines) Alex Eala (Japan) Kyōka Okamura (Thailand) Pimrada Jattavapornvanit (Kazakhstan) Gozal Ainitdinova
April 11	Nottingham, United Kingdom; Hard; W25; Singles and doubles draws	(Hong Kong) Eudice Chong; 6–2, 0–0, ret.	(Croatia) Jana Fett	(United Kingdom) Jodie Burrage (South Korea) Ku Yeon-woo	(Poland) Urszula Radwańska (China) You Xiaodi (Slovenia) Dalila Jakupović (Canada) Katherine Sebov
April 11	Nottingham, United Kingdom; Hard; W25; Singles and doubles draws	(Hong Kong) Eudice Chong (Hong Kong) Cody Wong; 6–2, 6–3	(Netherlands) Isabelle Haverlag (Romania) Ioana Loredana Roșca	(United Kingdom) Jodie Burrage (South Korea) Ku Yeon-woo	(Poland) Urszula Radwańska (China) You Xiaodi (Slovenia) Dalila Jakupović (Canada) Katherine Sebov
April 11	Cairo, Egypt; Clay; W15; Singles and doubles draws	(Germany) Antonia Schmidt; 6–4, 6–7^{(6–8)}, 7–6^{(7–4)}	(Italy) Giulia Crescenzi	(Canada) Marina Stakusic (Romania) Briana Szabó	Mariia Tkacheva (Brazil) Sofia da Cruz Mendonça (Serbia) Tijana Sretenović (Armenia) Ani Amiraghyan
April 11	Cairo, Egypt; Clay; W15; Singles and doubles draws	(Romania) Ilinca Amariei (Germany) Carolina Kuhl; 6–2, 2–6, [10–3]	(Italy) Diletta Cherubini (Germany) Emily Welker	(Canada) Marina Stakusic (Romania) Briana Szabó	Mariia Tkacheva (Brazil) Sofia da Cruz Mendonça (Serbia) Tijana Sretenović (Armenia) Ani Amiraghyan
April 11	Monastir, Tunisia; Hard; W15; Singles and doubles draws	(Italy) Angelica Raggi; 6–3, 3–6, 7–5	(Malta) Francesca Curmi	(Netherlands) Lian Tran (China) Liu Fangzhou	(France) Manon Léonard (United States) Dasha Ivanova (Spain) Noelia Bouzó Zanotti (Hungary) Rebeka Stolmár
April 11	Monastir, Tunisia; Hard; W15; Singles and doubles draws	(United States) Dasha Ivanova; Ekaterina Yashina; 6–4, 6–7^{(1–7)}, [10–4]	(Nigeria) Oyinlomo Quadre (China) Yang Yidi	(Netherlands) Lian Tran (China) Liu Fangzhou	(France) Manon Léonard (United States) Dasha Ivanova (Spain) Noelia Bouzó Zanotti (Hungary) Rebeka Stolmár
April 11	Antalya, Turkey; Clay; W15; Singles and doubles draws	Mirra Andreeva; 7–5, 6–2	(Germany) Silvia Ambrosio	(Hungary) Natália Szabanin (Belgium) Vicky Van de Peer	Vlada Koval; Diana Demidova (Japan) Rina Saigo (Bulgaria) Mihaela Tsoneva
April 11	Antalya, Turkey; Clay; W15; Singles and doubles draws	(Sweden) Vanessa Ersöz (Turkey) Doğa Türkmen; 7–6^{(7–2)}, 3–6, [10–5]	Ksenia Laskutova (Bulgaria) Gergana Topalova	(Hungary) Natália Szabanin (Belgium) Vicky Van de Peer	Vlada Koval; Diana Demidova (Japan) Rina Saigo (Bulgaria) Mihaela Tsoneva
April 18	Chiasso Open; Chiasso, Switzerland; Clay; W60; Singles – Doubles	(Italy) Lucia Bronzetti; 2–6, 6–3, 6–3	(Switzerland) Simona Waltert	Natalia Vikhlyantseva (Cyprus) Raluca Șerban	(Italy) Martina Di Giuseppe (Switzerland) Sebastianna Scilipoti (Hungary) Réka Luca Jani (Japan) Yuki Naito
April 18	Chiasso Open; Chiasso, Switzerland; Clay; W60; Singles – Doubles	(Czech Republic) Anastasia Dețiuc (Czech Republic) Miriam Kolodziejová; 6–3, 1–6, [10–8]	(Spain) Aliona Bolsova; Oksana Selekhmeteva	Natalia Vikhlyantseva (Cyprus) Raluca Șerban	(Italy) Martina Di Giuseppe (Switzerland) Sebastianna Scilipoti (Hungary) Réka Luca Jani (Japan) Yuki Naito
April 18	Boar's Head Resort Women's Open; Charlottesville, United States; Clay; W60; Singles – Doubles	(United States) Louisa Chirico; 6–4, 6–3	(China) Wang Xiyu	(Italy) Lucrezia Stefanini (Germany) Tatjana Maria	(United States) Robin Anderson (United States) Ellie Douglas (United States) Taylor Townsend (Japan) Kurumi Nara
April 18	Boar's Head Resort Women's Open; Charlottesville, United States; Clay; W60; Singles – Doubles	(United States) Sophie Chang (United States) Angela Kulikov; 2–6, 6–3, [10–4]	(Greece) Valentini Grammatikopoulou (United States) Alycia Parks	(Italy) Lucrezia Stefanini (Germany) Tatjana Maria	(United States) Robin Anderson (United States) Ellie Douglas (United States) Taylor Townsend (Japan) Kurumi Nara
April 18	Santa Margherita di Pula, Italy; Clay; W25; Singles and doubles draws	(Italy) Camilla Rosatello; 6–3, 6–4	Ekaterina Reyngold	(Spain) Guiomar Maristany (Netherlands) Eva Vedder	(North Macedonia) Lina Gjorcheska; Darya Astakhova (Italy) Melania Delai (Croatia) Tena Lukas
April 18	Santa Margherita di Pula, Italy; Clay; W25; Singles and doubles draws	Darya Astakhova; Ekaterina Reyngold; 7–6^{(8–6)}, 6–4	(Italy) Anna Turati (Italy) Bianca Turati	(Spain) Guiomar Maristany (Netherlands) Eva Vedder	(North Macedonia) Lina Gjorcheska; Darya Astakhova (Italy) Melania Delai (Croatia) Tena Lukas
April 18	Monastir, Tunisia; Hard; W25; Singles and doubles draws	(China) Zhu Lin; 6–1, 4–6, 6–4	(Canada) Victoria Mboko	(Spain) Rosa Vicens Mas (Italy) Angelica Raggi	(Uzbekistan) Nigina Abduraimova; Valeria Savinykh (China) Liu Fangzhou (Egypt) Sandra Samir
April 18	Monastir, Tunisia; Hard; W25; Singles and doubles draws	(France) Estelle Cascino (France) Jessika Ponchet; 6–0, 4–6, [10–7]	Polina Kudermetova; Sofya Lansere	(Spain) Rosa Vicens Mas (Italy) Angelica Raggi	(Uzbekistan) Nigina Abduraimova; Valeria Savinykh (China) Liu Fangzhou (Egypt) Sandra Samir
April 18	Nottingham, United Kingdom; Hard; W25; Singles and doubles draws	(United Kingdom) Eden Silva; 6–4, 6–4	(United States) Robin Montgomery	(United States) Hina Inoue (Canada) Katherine Sebov	(Hong Kong) Cody Wong (United States) Sofia Sewing (Chinese Taipei) Joanna Garland (France) Alice Robbe
April 18	Nottingham, United Kingdom; Hard; W25; Singles and doubles draws	(Czech Republic) Gabriela Knutson (Slovakia) Katarína Strešnáková; 7–6^{(7–5)}, 6–3	(United Kingdom) Lauryn John-Baptiste (France) Alice Robbe	(United States) Hina Inoue (Canada) Katherine Sebov	(Hong Kong) Cody Wong (United States) Sofia Sewing (Chinese Taipei) Joanna Garland (France) Alice Robbe
April 18	Orlando USTA Pro Circuit Event; Orlando, United States; Clay; W25; Singles and doubles draws	(Sweden) Mirjam Björklund; 6–3, 6–4	(Romania) Alexandra Cadanțu-Ignatik	(United States) Alexis Blokhina (United States) Grace Min	(United States) Madison Sieg (United States) Catherine Harrison (United States) Chiara Scholl (United States) Reese Brantmeier
April 18	Orlando USTA Pro Circuit Event; Orlando, United States; Clay; W25; Singles and doubles draws	(United States) Catherine Harrison (United States) Maegan Manasse; 6–1, 6–0	(Chinese Taipei) Hsieh Yu-chieh (Chinese Taipei) Hsu Chieh-yu	(United States) Alexis Blokhina (United States) Grace Min	(United States) Madison Sieg (United States) Catherine Harrison (United States) Chiara Scholl (United States) Reese Brantmeier
April 18	Piracicaba, Brazil; Clay; W15; Singles and doubles draws	(Slovakia) Bianca Behúlová; 2–6, 6–1, 6–4	Jana Kolodynska	(Brazil) Thaisa Grana Pedretti (Chile) Fernanda Labraña	(Chile) Fernanda Astete (Peru) Romina Ccuno (United States) Sabastiani León (Argentina) Martina Capurro Taborda
April 18	Piracicaba, Brazil; Clay; W15; Singles and doubles draws	(United States) Sabastiani León (Czech Republic) Laetitia Pulchartová; 6–4, 7–6^{(7–4)}	(Chile) Fernanda Astete (Switzerland) Marie Mettraux	(Brazil) Thaisa Grana Pedretti (Chile) Fernanda Labraña	(Chile) Fernanda Astete (Peru) Romina Ccuno (United States) Sabastiani León (Argentina) Martina Capurro Taborda
April 18	Cairo, Egypt; Clay; W15; Singles and doubles draws	Anastasia Zolotareva; 7–5, 6–3	(Germany) Emily Welker	(Sweden) Jacqueline Cabaj Awad (Romania) Lavinia Tănăsie	(Bulgaria) Julia Stamatova (Bulgaria) Denislava Glushkova (Armenia) Ani Amiraghyan (Italy) Diletta Cherubini
April 18	Cairo, Egypt; Clay; W15; Singles and doubles draws	(Italy) Diletta Cherubini; Mariia Tkacheva; 3–6, 6–3, [10–8]	(France) Émeline Dartron (France) Lucie Nguyen Tan	(Sweden) Jacqueline Cabaj Awad (Romania) Lavinia Tănăsie	(Bulgaria) Julia Stamatova (Bulgaria) Denislava Glushkova (Armenia) Ani Amiraghyan (Italy) Diletta Cherubini
April 18	Shymkent, Kazakhstan; Clay; W15; Singles and doubles draws	Diana Shnaider; 6–2, 7–5	Ekaterina Maklakova	Tatiana Barkova; Polina Pavlova	(Kazakhstan) Zhibek Kulambayeva; Polina Iatcenko; Darya Shauha; Anastasia Sukhotina
April 18	Shymkent, Kazakhstan; Clay; W15; Singles and doubles draws	(Kazakhstan) Zhibek Kulambayeva; Anastasia Sukhotina; 6–1, 6–4	Ekaterina Maklakova; Ksenia Zaytseva	Tatiana Barkova; Polina Pavlova	(Kazakhstan) Zhibek Kulambayeva; Polina Iatcenko; Darya Shauha; Anastasia Sukhotina
April 18	Chiang Rai, Thailand; Hard; W15; Singles and doubles draws	(Thailand) Luksika Kumkhum; 6–0, 6–1	(Australia) Talia Gibson	(Japan) Michika Ozeki (Thailand) Patcharin Cheapchandej	(China) Gao Xinyu (Thailand) Lanlana Tararudee (Thailand) Kamonwan Buayam (Chinese Taipei) Lee Pei-chi
April 18	Chiang Rai, Thailand; Hard; W15; Singles and doubles draws	(Australia) Catherine Aulia (Australia) Talia Gibson; 6–3, 7–6^{(7–5)}	(China) Ma Yexin (China) Xun Fangying	(Japan) Michika Ozeki (Thailand) Patcharin Cheapchandej	(China) Gao Xinyu (Thailand) Lanlana Tararudee (Thailand) Kamonwan Buayam (Chinese Taipei) Lee Pei-chi
April 18	Antalya, Turkey; Clay; W15; Singles and doubles draws	(Germany) Julia Middendorf; 6–1, 4–1, ret.	Victoria Kan	(Germany) Katharina Hering (Japan) Misaki Matsuda	Eva Garkusha (Turkey) İlay Yörük; Daria Lodikova (Japan) Rina Saigo
April 18	Antalya, Turkey; Clay; W15; Singles and doubles draws	(Japan) Misaki Matsuda (Japan) Riko Sawayanagi; 7–6^{(7–1)}, 6–2	(Japan) Rina Saigo (Japan) Yukina Saigo	(Germany) Katharina Hering (Japan) Misaki Matsuda	Eva Garkusha (Turkey) İlay Yörük; Daria Lodikova (Japan) Rina Saigo
April 25	LTP Charleston Pro Tennis; Charleston, United States; Clay; W100; Singles – Doubles	(United States) Taylor Townsend; 6–3, 6–2	(China) Wang Xiyu	(Brazil) Gabriela Cé (United States) Whitney Osuigwe	(Romania) Irina Bara (United States) Alexa Graham (United States) Katie Volynets (Japan) Nao Hibino
April 25	LTP Charleston Pro Tennis; Charleston, United States; Clay; W100; Singles – Doubles	(Poland) Katarzyna Kawa (Indonesia) Aldila Sutjiadi; 6–1, 6–4	(United States) Sophie Chang (United States) Angela Kulikov	(Brazil) Gabriela Cé (United States) Whitney Osuigwe	(Romania) Irina Bara (United States) Alexa Graham (United States) Katie Volynets (Japan) Nao Hibino
April 25	Zagreb Ladies Open; Zagreb, Croatia; Clay; W60; Singles – Doubles	(Germany) Jule Niemeier; 6–2, 6–2	(Hungary) Réka Luca Jani	(Bosnia and Herzegovina) Dea Herdželaš (Croatia) Petra Marčinko	(Croatia) Tena Lukas (Croatia) Antonia Ružić (Ukraine) Katarina Zavatska; Iryna Shymanovich
April 25	Zagreb Ladies Open; Zagreb, Croatia; Clay; W60; Singles – Doubles	(Czech Republic) Anastasia Dețiuc (Ukraine) Katarina Zavatska; 6–4, 6–7^{(5–7)}, [11–9]	(North Macedonia) Lina Gjorcheska; Irina Khromacheva	(Bosnia and Herzegovina) Dea Herdželaš (Croatia) Petra Marčinko	(Croatia) Tena Lukas (Croatia) Antonia Ružić (Ukraine) Katarina Zavatska; Iryna Shymanovich
April 25	Edge Istanbul; Istanbul, Turkey; Clay; W60; Singles – Doubles	Diana Shnaider; 7–5, 7–5	(Czech Republic) Nikola Bartůňková	(Poland) Maja Chwalińska (Netherlands) Suzan Lamens	(Spain) Aliona Bolsova (Belgium) Ysaline Bonaventure (Japan) Mai Hontama (Romania) Mihaela Buzărnescu
April 25	Edge Istanbul; Istanbul, Turkey; Clay; W60; Singles – Doubles	(Poland) Maja Chwalińska (Czech Republic) Jesika Malečková; 2–6, 6–4, [10–7]	(Turkey) Berfu Cengiz; Anastasia Tikhonova	(Poland) Maja Chwalińska (Netherlands) Suzan Lamens	(Spain) Aliona Bolsova (Belgium) Ysaline Bonaventure (Japan) Mai Hontama (Romania) Mihaela Buzărnescu
April 25	Cairo, Egypt; Clay; W25; Singles and doubles draws	Anastasia Zolotareva; 7–6^{(7–5)}, 7–6^{(7–4)}	(France) Séléna Janicijevic	(France) Océane Babel (Poland) Weronika Falkowska	(Romania) Lavinia Tănăsie (Romania) Briana Szabó (Austria) Sinja Kraus (Greece) Valentini Grammatikopoulou
April 25	Cairo, Egypt; Clay; W25; Singles and doubles draws	(France) Océane Babel (Poland) Weronika Falkowska; 6–4, 6–1	(Sweden) Caijsa Hennemann; Mariia Tkacheva	(France) Océane Babel (Poland) Weronika Falkowska	(Romania) Lavinia Tănăsie (Romania) Briana Szabó (Austria) Sinja Kraus (Greece) Valentini Grammatikopoulou
April 25	Santa Margherita di Pula, Italy; Clay; W25; Singles and doubles draws	(Netherlands) Arantxa Rus; 6–4, 6–4	(Belgium) Marie Benoît	(Switzerland) Ylena In-Albon (Czech Republic) Sára Bejlek	(Italy) Federica Bilardo (Italy) Stefania Rubini (Italy) Martina Di Giuseppe (Italy) Nuria Brancaccio
April 25	Santa Margherita di Pula, Italy; Clay; W25; Singles and doubles draws	(Lithuania) Justina Mikulskytė (Slovenia) Nika Radišić; 4–6, 7–5, [10–7]	(Spain) Leyre Romero Gormaz (Netherlands) Arantxa Rus	(Switzerland) Ylena In-Albon (Czech Republic) Sára Bejlek	(Italy) Federica Bilardo (Italy) Stefania Rubini (Italy) Martina Di Giuseppe (Italy) Nuria Brancaccio
April 25	Monastir, Tunisia; Hard; W25; Singles and doubles draws	(Uzbekistan) Nigina Abduraimova; 3–6, 6–2, 6–2	(Spain) Yvonne Cavallé Reimers	(China) Wang Meiling (China) Lu Jiajing	(China) Zhu Lin (New Zealand) Paige Hourigan (Hong Kong) Adithya Karunaratne; Ekaterina Yashina
April 25	Monastir, Tunisia; Hard; W25; Singles and doubles draws	(Uzbekistan) Nigina Abduraimova (Japan) Hiroko Kuwata; 6–1, 3–6, [12–10]	(New Zealand) Paige Hourigan; Valeria Savinykh	(China) Wang Meiling (China) Lu Jiajing	(China) Zhu Lin (New Zealand) Paige Hourigan (Hong Kong) Adithya Karunaratne; Ekaterina Yashina
April 25	São Paulo, Brazil; Clay; W15; Singles and doubles draws	(Argentina) Martina Capurro Taborda; 6–1, 6–3	(Switzerland) Nadine Keller	(Bolivia) Noelia Zeballos (Peru) Romina Ccuno	(Brazil) Thaisa Grana Pedretti (Slovakia) Nikola Daubnerová (France) Jade Bornay (United States) Sabastiani León
April 25	São Paulo, Brazil; Clay; W15; Singles and doubles draws	(Argentina) Martina Capurro Taborda (Chile) Fernanda Labraña; 6–2, 6–1	(Chile) Fernanda Astete (Mexico) Marian Gómez Pezuela Cano	(Bolivia) Noelia Zeballos (Peru) Romina Ccuno	(Brazil) Thaisa Grana Pedretti (Slovakia) Nikola Daubnerová (France) Jade Bornay (United States) Sabastiani León
April 25	Shymkent, Kazakhstan; Clay; W15; Singles and doubles draws	Tatiana Barkova; 6–2, 6–4	(Kazakhstan) Zhibek Kulambayeva	Anastasia Sukhotina (Netherlands) Stéphanie Visscher	Polina Iatcenko; Darya Shauha; Ekaterina Maklakova; Daria Khomutsianskaya
April 25	Shymkent, Kazakhstan; Clay; W15; Singles and doubles draws	(Kazakhstan) Zhibek Kulambayeva (Netherlands) Stéphanie Visscher; 7–6^{(7–4)}, 6–1	(Kazakhstan) Zhanel Rustemova (Kazakhstan) Aruzhan Sagandikova	Anastasia Sukhotina (Netherlands) Stéphanie Visscher	Polina Iatcenko; Darya Shauha; Ekaterina Maklakova; Daria Khomutsianskaya
April 25	Chiang Rai, Thailand; Hard; W15; Singles and doubles draws	(China) Ma Yexin; 6–4, 6–1	(Japan) Haruna Arakawa	(Thailand) Patcharin Cheapchandej (Thailand) Lanlana Tararudee	(China) Xun Fangying (Thailand) Punnin Kovapitukted (Japan) Michika Ozeki (Hong Kong) Wu Ho-ching
April 25	Chiang Rai, Thailand; Hard; W15; Singles and doubles draws	(China) Gao Xinyu (China) Xun Fangying; 6–3, 7–6^{(7–4)}	(Hong Kong) Maggie Ng (Hong Kong) Wu Ho-ching	(Thailand) Patcharin Cheapchandej (Thailand) Lanlana Tararudee	(China) Xun Fangying (Thailand) Punnin Kovapitukted (Japan) Michika Ozeki (Hong Kong) Wu Ho-ching
April 25	Antalya, Turkey; Clay; W15; Singles and doubles draws	Ksenia Laskutova; 6–3, 2–6, 6–4	(Portugal) Inês Murta	(Germany) Julia Middendorf (Japan) Miyu Kato	(Netherlands) Merel Hoedt (Germany) Lara Schmidt; Yana Karpovich (Canada) Mia Kupres
April 25	Antalya, Turkey; Clay; W15; Singles and doubles draws	Ksenia Laskutova (Japan) Misaki Matsuda; 7–5, 6–4	(Japan) Rina Saigo (Japan) Yukina Saigo	(Germany) Julia Middendorf (Japan) Miyu Kato	(Netherlands) Merel Hoedt (Germany) Lara Schmidt; Yana Karpovich (Canada) Mia Kupres

=== May ===
Week of	Tournament	Winner	Runners-up	Semifinalists	Quarterfinalists
May 2	Wiesbaden Tennis Open; Wiesbaden, Germany; Clay; W100; Singles – Doubles	(Montenegro) Danka Kovinić; 6–3, 7–6^{(7–0)}	(Germany) Nastasja Schunk	(Lithuania) Justina Mikulskytė (Germany) Jule Niemeier	(Austria) Sinja Kraus (Germany) Eva Lys; Oksana Selekhmeteva (Sweden) Rebecca Peterson
May 2	Wiesbaden Tennis Open; Wiesbaden, Germany; Clay; W100; Singles – Doubles	Amina Anshba (Hungary) Panna Udvardy; 6–2, 6–4	(Venezuela) Andrea Gámiz (Netherlands) Eva Vedder	(Lithuania) Justina Mikulskytė (Germany) Jule Niemeier	(Austria) Sinja Kraus (Germany) Eva Lys; Oksana Selekhmeteva (Sweden) Rebecca Peterson
May 2	FineMark Women's Pro Tennis Championship; Bonita Springs, United States; Clay; W100; Singles – Doubles	(Romania) Gabriela Lee; 6–1, 6–3	(Poland) Katarzyna Kawa	(United States) Katie Volynets (China) Wang Xiyu	(Romania) Irina Bara (Romania) Alexandra Cadanțu-Ignatik (United States) Kayla Day (Brazil) Gabriela Cé
May 2	FineMark Women's Pro Tennis Championship; Bonita Springs, United States; Clay; W100; Singles – Doubles	(Hungary) Tímea Babos (Japan) Nao Hibino; 6–4, 3–6, [10–7]	Olga Govortsova (Poland) Katarzyna Kawa	(United States) Katie Volynets (China) Wang Xiyu	(Romania) Irina Bara (Romania) Alexandra Cadanțu-Ignatik (United States) Kayla Day (Brazil) Gabriela Cé
May 2	I.ČLTK Prague Open; Prague, Czech Republic; Clay; W60; Singles – Doubles	(Poland) Maja Chwalińska; 7–5, 6–3	(Georgia (country)) Ekaterine Gorgodze	(Mexico) Fernanda Contreras (Czech Republic) Miriam Kolodziejová	(Australia) Lizette Cabrera (Romania) Andreea Prisăcariu (Chile) Bárbara Gatica (Hungary) Réka Luca Jani
May 2	I.ČLTK Prague Open; Prague, Czech Republic; Clay; W60; Singles – Doubles	(Chile) Bárbara Gatica (Brazil) Rebeca Pereira; 6–4, 6–2	(Czech Republic) Miriam Kolodziejová (Czech Republic) Jesika Malečková	(Mexico) Fernanda Contreras (Czech Republic) Miriam Kolodziejová	(Australia) Lizette Cabrera (Romania) Andreea Prisăcariu (Chile) Bárbara Gatica (Hungary) Réka Luca Jani
May 2	Koper Open; Koper, Slovenia; Clay; W60; Singles – Doubles	(Liechtenstein) Kathinka von Deichmann; 3–6, 6–3, 6–2	(Spain) Andrea Lázaro García	(Belgium) Ysaline Bonaventure (Austria) Julia Grabher	(France) Chloé Paquet (Serbia) Olga Danilović (Switzerland) Joanne Züger (Burundi) Sada Nahimana
May 2	Koper Open; Koper, Slovenia; Clay; W60; Singles – Doubles	(Switzerland) Xenia Knoll (United Kingdom) Samantha Murray Sharan; 6–3, 6–2	(Switzerland) Conny Perrin (Switzerland) Joanne Züger	(Belgium) Ysaline Bonaventure (Austria) Julia Grabher	(France) Chloé Paquet (Serbia) Olga Danilović (Switzerland) Joanne Züger (Burundi) Sada Nahimana
May 2	Split, Croatia; Clay; W25; Singles and doubles draws	(Finland) Anastasia Kulikova; 7–6^{(7–4)}, 6–1	(Japan) Yuki Naito	(Croatia) Tena Lukas (Germany) Katharina Hobgarski	(Slovakia) Viktória Kužmová (Croatia) Lucija Ćirić Bagarić (Austria) Barbara Haas (Croatia) Tara Würth
May 2	Split, Croatia; Clay; W25; Singles and doubles draws	(Croatia) Lea Bošković (Slovenia) Veronika Erjavec; 4–6, 6–1, [10–2]	(Japan) Mana Kawamura (Japan) Funa Kozaki	(Croatia) Tena Lukas (Germany) Katharina Hobgarski	(Slovakia) Viktória Kužmová (Croatia) Lucija Ćirić Bagarić (Austria) Barbara Haas (Croatia) Tara Würth
May 2	Santa Margherita di Pula, Italy; Clay; W25; Singles and doubles draws	(Czech Republic) Sára Bejlek; 7–6^{(7–4)}, 6–1	(Poland) Weronika Falkowska	(Italy) Camilla Rosatello; Maria Bondarenko	Victoria Kan (Germany) Emily Seibold (Italy) Angelica Moratelli (Portugal) Francisca Jorge
May 2	Santa Margherita di Pula, Italy; Clay; W25; Singles and doubles draws	(Italy) Angelica Moratelli (Italy) Camilla Rosatello; 6–4, 7–5	(Portugal) Francisca Jorge (Portugal) Matilde Jorge	(Italy) Camilla Rosatello; Maria Bondarenko	Victoria Kan (Germany) Emily Seibold (Italy) Angelica Moratelli (Portugal) Francisca Jorge
May 2	Tossa de Mar, Spain; Carpet; W25+H; Singles and doubles draws	(Spain) Rosa Vicens Mas; 7–5, 6–3	(South Africa) Isabella Kruger	(Romania) Ioana Loredana Roșca (Turkey) Pemra Özgen	(Spain) Marina Bassols Ribera (Japan) Mei Yamaguchi (Switzerland) Jenny Dürst (Italy) Giulia Gatto-Monticone
May 2	Tossa de Mar, Spain; Carpet; W25+H; Singles and doubles draws	(Spain) Marina Bassols Ribera (Romania) Ioana Loredana Roșca; 7–5, 6–0	(Spain) Yvonne Cavallé Reimers (Spain) Celia Cerviño Ruiz	(Romania) Ioana Loredana Roșca (Turkey) Pemra Özgen	(Spain) Marina Bassols Ribera (Japan) Mei Yamaguchi (Switzerland) Jenny Dürst (Italy) Giulia Gatto-Monticone
May 2	Båstad, Sweden; Clay; W25; Singles and doubles draws	(Turkey) İpek Öz; 6–3, 6–1	Irina Khromacheva	(Japan) Misaki Matsuda (Sweden) Caijsa Hennemann	(Belgium) Marie Benoît (Ukraine) Anastasiya Soboleva (Norway) Malene Helgø (Sweden) Fanny Östlund
May 2	Båstad, Sweden; Clay; W25; Singles and doubles draws	(Germany) Mona Barthel (Sweden) Caijsa Hennemann; 6–1, 6–4	(France) Julie Belgraver (Sweden) Fanny Östlund	(Japan) Misaki Matsuda (Sweden) Caijsa Hennemann	(Belgium) Marie Benoît (Ukraine) Anastasiya Soboleva (Norway) Malene Helgø (Sweden) Fanny Östlund
May 2	Monastir, Tunisia; Hard; W25; Singles and doubles draws	(Hong Kong) Adithya Karunaratne; 6–3, 6–3	(Japan) Sakura Hosogi	(Uzbekistan) Nigina Abduraimova (Denmark) Olga Helmi	(Egypt) Sandra Samir (Japan) Ayumi Koshiishi; Polina Kudermetova (Australia) Kimberly Birrell
May 2	Monastir, Tunisia; Hard; W25; Singles and doubles draws	(China) Liu Fangzhou (Japan) Erika Sema; 6–3, 6–2	(Uzbekistan) Nigina Abduraimova; Aleksandra Pospelova	(Uzbekistan) Nigina Abduraimova (Denmark) Olga Helmi	(Egypt) Sandra Samir (Japan) Ayumi Koshiishi; Polina Kudermetova (Australia) Kimberly Birrell
May 2	Nottingham, United Kingdom; Hard; W25; Singles and doubles draws	(United Kingdom) Sonay Kartal; 6–1, 6–0	(United States) Danielle Lao	(Hungary) Fanny Stollár (Hong Kong) Eudice Chong	(France) Alice Robbe (United Kingdom) Eden Silva (Slovakia) Katarína Strešnáková (Chinese Taipei) Joanna Garland
May 2	Nottingham, United Kingdom; Hard; W25; Singles and doubles draws	(Japan) Mana Ayukawa (Australia) Alana Parnaby; 7–5, 6–4	(Hong Kong) Eudice Chong (Hong Kong) Cody Wong	(Hungary) Fanny Stollár (Hong Kong) Eudice Chong	(France) Alice Robbe (United Kingdom) Eden Silva (Slovakia) Katarína Strešnáková (Chinese Taipei) Joanna Garland
May 2	Daytona Beach, United States; Clay; W25; Singles and doubles draws	(United States) Katrina Scott; 6–2, 6–4	(United States) Reese Brantmeier	(United States) Alexa Graham (Canada) Françoise Abanda	(United States) Elvina Kalieva (Mexico) María Portillo Ramírez (Germany) Sina Herrmann (United States) Eleana Yu
May 2	Daytona Beach, United States; Clay; W25; Singles and doubles draws	(Chinese Taipei) Hsieh Yu-chieh (Chinese Taipei) Hsu Chieh-yu; 7–5, 6–0	(Switzerland) Chelsea Fontenel (United States) Hina Inoue	(United States) Alexa Graham (Canada) Françoise Abanda	(United States) Elvina Kalieva (Mexico) María Portillo Ramírez (Germany) Sina Herrmann (United States) Eleana Yu
May 2	Curitiba, Brazil; Clay; W15; Singles and doubles draws	(Slovakia) Bianca Behúlová; 6–4, 7–6^{(7–2)}	(Argentina) Martina Capurro Taborda	(Chile) Fernanda Astete (Switzerland) Nadine Keller	(United States) Sabastiani León (Bolivia) Noelia Zeballos (Paraguay) Susan Doldán (Peru) Romina Ccuno
May 2	Curitiba, Brazil; Clay; W15; Singles and doubles draws	(Argentina) Martina Capurro Taborda (Chile) Fernanda Labraña; 6–1, 6–4	(Portugal) Ana Filipa Santos (Bolivia) Noelia Zeballos	(Chile) Fernanda Astete (Switzerland) Nadine Keller	(United States) Sabastiani León (Bolivia) Noelia Zeballos (Paraguay) Susan Doldán (Peru) Romina Ccuno
May 2	Cairo, Egypt; Clay; W15; Singles and doubles draws	(Chinese Taipei) Yang Ya-yi; 6–3, 6–3	(Austria) Melanie Klaffner	Anastasia Zolotareva (Bulgaria) Gergana Topalova	(Egypt) Yasmin Ezzat (Netherlands) Demi Tran (France) Océane Babel (Bulgaria) Denislava Glushkova
May 2	Cairo, Egypt; Clay; W15; Singles and doubles draws	(Austria) Melanie Klaffner; Anastasia Zolotareva; 6–1, 7–5	(France) Océane Babel (Netherlands) Noa Liauw a Fong	Anastasia Zolotareva (Bulgaria) Gergana Topalova	(Egypt) Yasmin Ezzat (Netherlands) Demi Tran (France) Océane Babel (Bulgaria) Denislava Glushkova
May 2	Antalya, Turkey; Clay; W15; Singles and doubles draws	(Japan) Rina Saigo; 6–3, 6–0	Daria Lodikova	(Netherlands) Merel Hoedt (Germany) Chiara Tomasetti	Diana Demidova (Turkey) İlay Yörük (Bulgaria) Dia Evtimova (Canada) Kayla Cross
May 2	Antalya, Turkey; Clay; W15; Singles and doubles draws	(Bulgaria) Dia Evtimova (Portugal) Inês Murta; 6–0, 6–2	(Japan) Rina Saigo (Japan) Yukina Saigo	(Netherlands) Merel Hoedt (Germany) Chiara Tomasetti	Diana Demidova (Turkey) İlay Yörük (Bulgaria) Dia Evtimova (Canada) Kayla Cross
May 9	Torneig Internacional de Tennis Femení Solgironès; La Bisbal d'Empordà, Spain; Clay; W100+H; Singles – Doubles	(China) Wang Xinyu; 3–6, 7–6^{(7–0)}, 6–0	Erika Andreeva	(United States) Asia Muhammad (Andorra) Victoria Jiménez Kasintseva	(Mexico) Renata Zarazúa (Spain) Rebeka Masarova (Spain) Marina Bassols Ribera (Latvia) Daniela Vismane
May 9	Torneig Internacional de Tennis Femení Solgironès; La Bisbal d'Empordà, Spain; Clay; W100+H; Singles – Doubles	(Andorra) Victoria Jiménez Kasintseva (Mexico) Renata Zarazúa; 6–4, 2–6, [10–8]	(United Kingdom) Alicia Barnett (United Kingdom) Olivia Nicholls	(United States) Asia Muhammad (Andorra) Victoria Jiménez Kasintseva	(Mexico) Renata Zarazúa (Spain) Rebeka Masarova (Spain) Marina Bassols Ribera (Latvia) Daniela Vismane
May 9	Open Saint-Gaudens Occitanie; Saint-Gaudens, France; Clay; W60; Singles – Doubles	(Switzerland) Ylena In-Albon; 4–6, 6–4, 6–3	(Brazil) Carolina Alves	(Ukraine) Daria Snigur (Switzerland) Simona Waltert	(France) Carole Monnet; Yuliya Hatouka (Australia) Astra Sharma (Japan) Yuki Naito
May 9	Open Saint-Gaudens Occitanie; Saint-Gaudens, France; Clay; W60; Singles – Doubles	(Mexico) Fernanda Contreras (Switzerland) Lulu Sun; 7–5, 6–2	(Greece) Valentini Grammatikopoulou; Anastasia Tikhonova	(Ukraine) Daria Snigur (Switzerland) Simona Waltert	(France) Carole Monnet; Yuliya Hatouka (Australia) Astra Sharma (Japan) Yuki Naito
May 9	Osijek, Croatia; Clay; W25; Singles and doubles draws	(Czech Republic) Dominika Šalková; 6–1, 6–2	(Croatia) Antonia Ružić	(United States) Jessie Aney (Croatia) Tena Lukas	(Slovenia) Veronika Erjavec (Croatia) Mariana Dražić (Serbia) Lola Radivojević (Switzerland) Bojana Klincov
May 9	Osijek, Croatia; Clay; W25; Singles and doubles draws	(Japan) Mana Kawamura (Japan) Funa Kozaki; 6–3, 2–6, [10–8]	(United States) Jessie Aney (Brazil) Ingrid Gamarra Martins	(United States) Jessie Aney (Croatia) Tena Lukas	(Slovenia) Veronika Erjavec (Croatia) Mariana Dražić (Serbia) Lola Radivojević (Switzerland) Bojana Klincov
May 9	Santa Margherita di Pula, Italy; Clay; W25; Singles and doubles draws	(Latvia) Darja Semenistaja; 6–4, 4–6, 6–1	Irina Khromacheva	(Italy) Deborah Chiesa (France) Lucie Nguyen Tan	(Spain) Ángela Fita Boluda (Portugal) Francisca Jorge (Portugal) Matilde Jorge (Colombia) Yuliana Lizarazo
May 9	Santa Margherita di Pula, Italy; Clay; W25; Singles and doubles draws	(Portugal) Francisca Jorge (Portugal) Matilde Jorge; 7–5, 0–6, [11–9]	(Italy) Martina Colmegna (Italy) Lisa Pigato	(Italy) Deborah Chiesa (France) Lucie Nguyen Tan	(Spain) Ángela Fita Boluda (Portugal) Francisca Jorge (Portugal) Matilde Jorge (Colombia) Yuliana Lizarazo
May 9	Varberg, Sweden; Clay; W25; Singles and doubles draws	(Denmark) Sofia Samavati; 1–6, 6–1, 6–4	(Norway) Malene Helgø	(Czech Republic) Anna Sisková (Latvia) Kamilla Bartone	(Germany) Yana Morderger (Sweden) Caijsa Hennemann; Ekaterina Makarova (Germany) Mona Barthel
May 9	Varberg, Sweden; Clay; W25; Singles and doubles draws	(Sweden) Jacqueline Cabaj Awad (Sweden) Caijsa Hennemann; 6–1, 6–3	(Sweden) June Björk (Sweden) Julita Saner	(Czech Republic) Anna Sisková (Latvia) Kamilla Bartone	(Germany) Yana Morderger (Sweden) Caijsa Hennemann; Ekaterina Makarova (Germany) Mona Barthel
May 9	Nottingham, United Kingdom; Hard; W25; Singles and doubles draws	(United Kingdom) Sonay Kartal; 6–3, 6–1	(Chinese Taipei) Joanna Garland	(United Kingdom) Eden Silva (Slovakia) Viktória Morvayová	(United States) Robin Montgomery (Australia) Kimberly Birrell (France) Alice Robbe (China) Lu Jiajing
May 9	Nottingham, United Kingdom; Hard; W25; Singles and doubles draws	(United Kingdom) Naiktha Bains (United Kingdom) Maia Lumsden; 3–6, 7–6^{(8–6)}, [11–9]	(Australia) Kimberly Birrell (Australia) Alexandra Osborne	(United Kingdom) Eden Silva (Slovakia) Viktória Morvayová	(United States) Robin Montgomery (Australia) Kimberly Birrell (France) Alice Robbe (China) Lu Jiajing
May 9	Sarasota, United States; Clay; W25; Singles and doubles draws	(United States) Elizabeth Halbauer; 7–5, 6–2	(United States) Ashlyn Krueger	(Argentina) María Lourdes Carlé (United States) Samantha Crawford	(Mexico) María Portillo Ramírez (United States) Sophie Chang (Germany) Sabine Lisicki (United States) Kennedy Shaffer
May 9	Sarasota, United States; Clay; W25; Singles and doubles draws	(China) Ma Yexin (Lithuania) Akvilė Paražinskaitė; 6–2, 7–5	(Chinese Taipei) Hsieh Yu-chieh (Chinese Taipei) Hsu Chieh-yu	(Argentina) María Lourdes Carlé (United States) Samantha Crawford	(Mexico) María Portillo Ramírez (United States) Sophie Chang (Germany) Sabine Lisicki (United States) Kennedy Shaffer
May 9	São Paulo, Brazil; Clay; W15; Singles and doubles draws	(Argentina) Martina Capurro Taborda; 2–6, 6–3, 6–0	(Bolivia) Noelia Zeballos	(Switzerland) Nadine Keller (Chile) Fernanda Astete	(Peru) Romina Ccuno (Brazil) Júlia Konishi Camargo Silva (Argentina) Tiziana Rossini (Chile) Fernanda Labraña
May 9	São Paulo, Brazil; Clay; W15; Singles and doubles draws	(Argentina) Martina Capurro Taborda (Chile) Fernanda Labraña; 7–6^{(7–1)}, 3–6, [10–7]	(Peru) Romina Ccuno (Bolivia) Noelia Zeballos	(Switzerland) Nadine Keller (Chile) Fernanda Astete	(Peru) Romina Ccuno (Brazil) Júlia Konishi Camargo Silva (Argentina) Tiziana Rossini (Chile) Fernanda Labraña
May 9	Cairo, Egypt; Clay; W15; Singles and doubles draws	(Germany) Noma Noha Akugue; 6–1, 6–1	(Chinese Taipei) Yang Ya-yi	(Italy) Matilde Mariani (Ukraine) Vladlena Bokova	(Italy) Diletta Cherubini (Bulgaria) Ani Vangelova (France) Océane Babel (Slovakia) Barbora Matúšová
May 9	Cairo, Egypt; Clay; W15; Singles and doubles draws	(Egypt) Yasmin Ezzat (Netherlands) Noa Liauw a Fong; 3–6, 6–3, [11–9]	(Germany) Noma Noha Akugue (Bulgaria) Ani Vangelova	(Italy) Matilde Mariani (Ukraine) Vladlena Bokova	(Italy) Diletta Cherubini (Bulgaria) Ani Vangelova (France) Océane Babel (Slovakia) Barbora Matúšová
May 9	Heraklion, Greece; Clay; W15; Singles and doubles draws	(Belgium) Tilwith Di Girolami; 6–1, 6–4	(Greece) Michaela Laki	(Greece) Eleni Christofi (Romania) Ilinca Amariei	(Germany) Franziska Sziedat (Slovakia) Radka Zelníčková (Slovakia) Eszter Méri (Australia) Gabriella Da Silva-Fick
May 9	Heraklion, Greece; Clay; W15; Singles and doubles draws	(Greece) Michaela Laki (Greece) Dimitra Pavlou; 6–4, 7–6^{(7–3)}	(Czech Republic) Ivana Šebestová (Germany) Franziska Sziedat	(Greece) Eleni Christofi (Romania) Ilinca Amariei	(Germany) Franziska Sziedat (Slovakia) Radka Zelníčková (Slovakia) Eszter Méri (Australia) Gabriella Da Silva-Fick
May 9	Cancún, Mexico; Hard; W15; Singles and doubles draws	(Mexico) Jessica Hinojosa Gómez; 6–4, 6–4	(United States) Rachel Gailis	(Mexico) Quetzali Vázquez Montesinos (Mexico) María Fernanda Navarro	(Czech Republic) Lucie Petruželová (Guatemala) Kirsten-Andrea Weedon (United States) Brandy Walker (Guatemala) Melissa Morales
May 9	Cancún, Mexico; Hard; W15; Singles and doubles draws	(Japan) Saki Imamura (Chinese Taipei) Tsao Chia-yi; 6–3, 6–1	(Guatemala) Melissa Morales (Guatemala) Kirsten-Andrea Weedon	(Mexico) Quetzali Vázquez Montesinos (Mexico) María Fernanda Navarro	(Czech Republic) Lucie Petruželová (Guatemala) Kirsten-Andrea Weedon (United States) Brandy Walker (Guatemala) Melissa Morales
May 9	Monastir, Tunisia; Hard; W15; Singles and doubles draws	(China) Liu Fangzhou; 6–4, 7–5	(Japan) Ayumi Koshiishi	Aleksandra Pospelova (China) Yang Yidi	(China) Yao Xinxin (Tunisia) Chiraz Bechri (Japan) Chihiro Takayama (China) Wei Sijia
May 9	Monastir, Tunisia; Hard; W15; Singles and doubles draws	(United Kingdom) Kristina Paskauskas (China) Wei Sijia; 6–3, 7–6^{(7–4)}	(China) Liu Fangzhou (China) Wang Meiling	Aleksandra Pospelova (China) Yang Yidi	(China) Yao Xinxin (Tunisia) Chiraz Bechri (Japan) Chihiro Takayama (China) Wei Sijia
May 9	Antalya, Turkey; Clay; W15; Singles and doubles draws	Yana Karpovich; 6–2, 6–4	Valeriya Yushchenko	(Italy) Giulia Carbonaro; Daria Lodikova	(Italy) Ginevra Parentini Vallega Montebruno (Belgium) Chelsea Vanhoutte; Evialina Laskevich; Anastasia Zhilina
May 9	Antalya, Turkey; Clay; W15; Singles and doubles draws	Yana Karpovich; Daria Lodikova; 7–5, 6–7^{(2–7)}, [10–8]	Evialina Laskevich (Sweden) Izabelle Persson	(Italy) Giulia Carbonaro; Daria Lodikova	(Italy) Ginevra Parentini Vallega Montebruno (Belgium) Chelsea Vanhoutte; Evialina Laskevich; Anastasia Zhilina
May 16	Trofeo BMW Cup; Rome, Italy; Clay; W60; Singles – Doubles	(Croatia) Tena Lukas; 6–1, 6–4	(Chile) Bárbara Gatica	Darya Astakhova (Italy) Deborah Chiesa	(Hungary) Tímea Babos; Irina Khromacheva (Chile) Daniela Seguel (Romania) Cristina Dinu
May 16	Trofeo BMW Cup; Rome, Italy; Clay; W60; Singles – Doubles	(Italy) Matilde Paoletti (Italy) Lisa Pigato; 6–3, 7–6^{(9–7)}	Darya Astakhova (Latvia) Daniela Vismane	Darya Astakhova (Italy) Deborah Chiesa	(Hungary) Tímea Babos; Irina Khromacheva (Chile) Daniela Seguel (Romania) Cristina Dinu
May 16	Pelham Racquet Club Pro Classic; Pelham, United States; Clay; W60; Singles – Doubles	(Argentina) María Lourdes Carlé; 6–1, 6–1	(United States) Elvina Kalieva	(United States) Ashlyn Krueger (United States) Erica Oosterhout	(United States) Katrina Scott (United States) Caroline Lampl; Jana Kolodynska (United States) Haley Giavara
May 16	Pelham Racquet Club Pro Classic; Pelham, United States; Clay; W60; Singles – Doubles	(United States) Carolyn Ansari (Canada) Ariana Arseneault; 7–5, 6–1	(United States) Reese Brantmeier (United States) Elvina Kalieva	(United States) Ashlyn Krueger (United States) Erica Oosterhout	(United States) Katrina Scott (United States) Caroline Lampl; Jana Kolodynska (United States) Haley Giavara
May 16	Warmbad-Villach, Austria; Clay; W25; Singles and doubles draws	(Austria) Sinja Kraus; 7–5, 3–6, 6–4	(Poland) Weronika Falkowska	(Japan) Misaki Matsuda (Croatia) Lea Bošković	(Japan) Miharu Imanishi (Slovenia) Nika Radišić (Slovenia) Dalila Jakupović; Victoria Kan
May 16	Warmbad-Villach, Austria; Clay; W25; Singles and doubles draws	(Croatia) Lea Bošković (Slovenia) Veronika Erjavec; 3–6, 6–3, [11–9]	(Japan) Miharu Imanishi (Japan) Kanako Morisaki	(Japan) Misaki Matsuda (Croatia) Lea Bošković	(Japan) Miharu Imanishi (Slovenia) Nika Radišić (Slovenia) Dalila Jakupović; Victoria Kan
May 16	Akko, Israel; Hard; W25; Singles and doubles draws	(Japan) Haruna Arakawa; 6–4, 6–2	(Romania) Elena-Teodora Cadar	(Israel) Nicole Khirin (Japan) Kyōka Okamura	(Israel) Nicole Nadel (Australia) Olivia Tjandramulia (Slovakia) Viktória Morvayová (Japan) Rina Saigo
May 16	Akko, Israel; Hard; W25; Singles and doubles draws	(Israel) Nicole Khirin (Israel) Shavit Kimchi; 5–7, 7–5, [10–8]	(Japan) Haruna Arakawa (Japan) Natsuho Arakawa	(Israel) Nicole Khirin (Japan) Kyōka Okamura	(Israel) Nicole Nadel (Australia) Olivia Tjandramulia (Slovakia) Viktória Morvayová (Japan) Rina Saigo
May 16	Montemor-o-Novo, Portugal; Hard; W25; Singles and doubles draws	(France) Alice Robbe; 6–1, 6–2	(Turkey) Pemra Özgen	(United Kingdom) Sarah Beth Grey (Portugal) Francisca Jorge	(Slovakia) Sofia Milatová (Portugal) Inês Murta (Germany) Kathleen Kanev (Japan) Sakura Hosogi
May 16	Montemor-o-Novo, Portugal; Hard; W25; Singles and doubles draws	(Portugal) Francisca Jorge (Portugal) Matilde Jorge; 6–3, 6–4	(Australia) Alana Parnaby (India) Prarthana Thombare	(United Kingdom) Sarah Beth Grey (Portugal) Francisca Jorge	(Slovakia) Sofia Milatová (Portugal) Inês Murta (Germany) Kathleen Kanev (Japan) Sakura Hosogi
May 16	Platja d'Aro, Spain; Clay; W25; Singles and doubles draws	(Spain) Guiomar Maristany; 7–6^{(7–2)}, 6–4	(Spain) Jéssica Bouzas Maneiro	(United Kingdom) Amanda Carreras (Germany) Stephanie Wagner	(Ukraine) Valeriya Strakhova (Spain) Marina Bassols Ribera (Spain) Ángela Fita Boluda (Romania) Ioana Loredana Roșca
May 16	Platja d'Aro, Spain; Clay; W25; Singles and doubles draws	(Spain) Ángela Fita Boluda (Venezuela) Andrea Gámiz; 6–4, 3–6, [10–3]	(Netherlands) Isabelle Haverlag (Ukraine) Valeriya Strakhova	(United Kingdom) Amanda Carreras (Germany) Stephanie Wagner	(Ukraine) Valeriya Strakhova (Spain) Marina Bassols Ribera (Spain) Ángela Fita Boluda (Romania) Ioana Loredana Roșca
May 16	Naples, United States; Clay; W25; Singles and doubles draws	(United States) Kayla Day; 6–1, 6–1	(Mexico) Ana Sofía Sánchez	(United States) Hina Inoue (United States) Elizabeth Halbauer	(United States) Sonya Macavei (United States) Hurricane Tyra Black (United States) Alexis Blokhina (Japan) Himeno Sakatsume
May 16	Naples, United States; Clay; W25; Singles and doubles draws	(United States) Anna Rogers (United States) Christina Rosca; 6–1, 6–4	(United States) Rasheeda McAdoo (Mexico) Ana Sofía Sánchez	(United States) Hina Inoue (United States) Elizabeth Halbauer	(United States) Sonya Macavei (United States) Hurricane Tyra Black (United States) Alexis Blokhina (Japan) Himeno Sakatsume
May 16	Oran, Algeria; Clay; W15; Singles and doubles draws	(Algeria) Inès Ibbou; 6–4, 6–2	(Netherlands) Lexie Stevens	(Germany) Luisa Meyer auf der Heide (Slovakia) Ela Pláteníková	(Algeria) Lynda Benkaddour (India) Smriti Bhasin (Sweden) Louise Brunskog (Bulgaria) Viktoria Veleva
May 16	Oran, Algeria; Clay; W15; Singles and doubles draws	(Germany) Luisa Meyer auf der Heide (Netherlands) Lexie Stevens; 6–0, 6–1	(Denmark) Elena Jamshidi (Denmark) Divine Dasam Nweke	(Germany) Luisa Meyer auf der Heide (Slovakia) Ela Pláteníková	(Algeria) Lynda Benkaddour (India) Smriti Bhasin (Sweden) Louise Brunskog (Bulgaria) Viktoria Veleva
May 16	Cairo, Egypt; Clay; W15; Singles and doubles draws	(Slovakia) Barbora Matúšová; 6–2, 7–5	(Germany) Noma Noha Akugue	(Italy) Diletta Cherubini (Egypt) Yasmin Ezzat	(Egypt) Merna Refaat (Germany) Antonia Schmidt (Italy) Gloria Ceschi (Egypt) Mariam Atia
May 16	Cairo, Egypt; Clay; W15; Singles and doubles draws	(Italy) Diletta Cherubini (Germany) Antonia Schmidt; 6–1, 6–2	Elizaveta Masnaia; Sofiia Nagornaia	(Italy) Diletta Cherubini (Egypt) Yasmin Ezzat	(Egypt) Merna Refaat (Germany) Antonia Schmidt (Italy) Gloria Ceschi (Egypt) Mariam Atia
May 16	Heraklion, Greece; Clay; W15; Singles and doubles draws	(Serbia) Lola Radivojević; 6–3, 6–3	(Greece) Martha Matoula	(Greece) Dimitra Pavlou (Germany) Chantal Sauvant	(Greece) Michaela Laki (Italy) Giuliana Bestetti (Czech Republic) Ivana Šebestová (Australia) Gabriella Da Silva-Fick
May 16	Heraklion, Greece; Clay; W15; Singles and doubles draws	(Greece) Michaela Laki (Serbia) Lola Radivojević; 6–1, 4–6, [10–8]	(Australia) Gabriella Da Silva-Fick (Netherlands) Stéphanie Visscher	(Greece) Dimitra Pavlou (Germany) Chantal Sauvant	(Greece) Michaela Laki (Italy) Giuliana Bestetti (Czech Republic) Ivana Šebestová (Australia) Gabriella Da Silva-Fick
May 16	Cancún, Mexico; Hard; W15; Singles and doubles draws	(United States) Dasha Ivanova; 0–6, 6–3, 6–4	(Hong Kong) Wu Ho-ching	(Serbia) Katarina Kozarov (United States) Rachel Gailis	(Hong Kong) Maggie Ng (United States) Anne Christine Lutkemeyer Obregon (United States) Brandy Walker (Dominican Republic) Kelly Williford
May 16	Cancún, Mexico; Hard; W15; Singles and doubles draws	(Japan) Saki Imamura (Japan) Miho Kuramochi; 3–6, 6–3, [10–8]	(United States) Kariann Pierre-Louis (Dominican Republic) Kelly Williford	(Serbia) Katarina Kozarov (United States) Rachel Gailis	(Hong Kong) Maggie Ng (United States) Anne Christine Lutkemeyer Obregon (United States) Brandy Walker (Dominican Republic) Kelly Williford
May 16	Monastir, Tunisia; Hard; W15; Singles and doubles draws	(Japan) Ayumi Morita; 7–6^{(7–4)}, 7–5	(China) Yao Xinxin	(France) Yasmine Mansouri (Japan) Ayumi Koshiishi	(Italy) Viola Turini; Anna Ukolova (China) Yang Yidi (Germany) Anja Wildgruber
May 16	Monastir, Tunisia; Hard; W15; Singles and doubles draws	(China) Wei Sijia (China) Yao Xinxin; 6–1, 6–1	(Japan) Mei Hasegawa (Japan) Chihiro Takayama	(France) Yasmine Mansouri (Japan) Ayumi Koshiishi	(Italy) Viola Turini; Anna Ukolova (China) Yang Yidi (Germany) Anja Wildgruber
May 16	Antalya, Turkey; Clay; W15; Singles and doubles draws	Daria Lodikova; 6–2, 6–4	Valeriya Yushchenko	(Italy) Giulia Carbonaro (China) Lu Jingjing	(Slovakia) Timea Jarušková (Spain) Ana Lantigua de la Nuez (Turkey) İlay Yörük (Italy) Martina Colmegna
May 16	Antalya, Turkey; Clay; W15; Singles and doubles draws	(Italy) Martina Colmegna (Bulgaria) Dia Evtimova; 6–2, 3–6, [10–8]	(Turkey) Doğa Türkmen (Turkey) Melis Ayda Uyar	(Italy) Giulia Carbonaro (China) Lu Jingjing	(Slovakia) Timea Jarušková (Spain) Ana Lantigua de la Nuez (Turkey) İlay Yörük (Italy) Martina Colmegna
May 23	Città di Grado Tennis Cup; Grado, Italy; Clay; W60; Singles – Doubles	(Italy) Elisabetta Cocciaretto; 6–2, 6–2	(Switzerland) Ylena In-Albon	(Italy) Sara Errani (Slovenia) Dalila Jakupović	(Mexico) Marcela Zacarías (Austria) Barbara Haas (Switzerland) Simona Waltert; Anastasia Tikhonova
May 23	Città di Grado Tennis Cup; Grado, Italy; Clay; W60; Singles – Doubles	Alena Fomina-Klotz (Slovenia) Dalila Jakupović; 6–1, 6–4	(Hong Kong) Eudice Chong (Chinese Taipei) Liang En-shuo	(Italy) Sara Errani (Slovenia) Dalila Jakupović	(Mexico) Marcela Zacarías (Austria) Barbara Haas (Switzerland) Simona Waltert; Anastasia Tikhonova
May 23	Orlando USTA Pro Circuit Event; Orlando, United States; Hard; W60; Singles – Doubles	(United States) Robin Anderson; 7–5, 6–4	(United States) Sachia Vickery	(United States) Sophie Chang (United States) Kayla Day	(United States) Danielle Lao (United States) Maria Mateas (United States) Ellie Douglas (Argentina) María Lourdes Carlé
May 23	Orlando USTA Pro Circuit Event; Orlando, United States; Hard; W60; Singles – Doubles	(United States) Sophie Chang (United States) Angela Kulikov; 6–3, 2–6, [10–6]	(United States) Hanna Chang (United States) Elizabeth Mandlik	(United States) Sophie Chang (United States) Kayla Day	(United States) Danielle Lao (United States) Maria Mateas (United States) Ellie Douglas (Argentina) María Lourdes Carlé
May 23	Tbilisi, Georgia; Hard; W25; Singles and doubles draws	(United Kingdom) Anna Brogan; 6–3, 6–3	Kristina Dmitruk	Vitalia Diatchenko (Switzerland) Leonie Küng	Anastasia Zolotareva (Kazakhstan) Gozal Ainitdinova (Bosnia and Herzegovina) Nefisa Berberović; Vera Lapko
May 23	Tbilisi, Georgia; Hard; W25; Singles and doubles draws	(Bosnia and Herzegovina) Nefisa Berberović (China) Lu Jiajing; 6–2, 4–6, [10–7]	(Switzerland) Arlinda Rushiti (Switzerland) Tess Sugnaux	Vitalia Diatchenko (Switzerland) Leonie Küng	Anastasia Zolotareva (Kazakhstan) Gozal Ainitdinova (Bosnia and Herzegovina) Nefisa Berberović; Vera Lapko
May 23	Netanya, Israel; Hard; W25; Singles and doubles draws	(Australia) Priscilla Hon; 6–1, 6–3	(Belgium) Yanina Wickmayer	(Israel) Shavit Kimchi (Romania) Elena-Teodora Cadar	(United Kingdom) Emilie Lindh (Israel) Lina Glushko; Kira Pavlova (Chinese Taipei) Joanna Garland
May 23	Netanya, Israel; Hard; W25; Singles and doubles draws	(Japan) Haruna Arakawa (Japan) Natsuho Arakawa; 6–2, 6–4	(United Kingdom) Emilie Lindh (Israel) Nicole Nadel	(Israel) Shavit Kimchi (Romania) Elena-Teodora Cadar	(United Kingdom) Emilie Lindh (Israel) Lina Glushko; Kira Pavlova (Chinese Taipei) Joanna Garland
May 23	Oran, Algeria; Clay; W15; Singles and doubles draws	(Netherlands) Lexie Stevens; 7–6^{(7–4)}, ret.	(Algeria) Inès Ibbou	(Algeria) Lynda Benkaddour; Aglaya Fedorova	(Germany) Luisa Meyer auf der Heide (Algeria) Inès Bekrar (Sweden) Louise Brunskog (Denmark) Elena Jamshidi
May 23	Oran, Algeria; Clay; W15; Singles and doubles draws	(Algeria) Amira Benaïssa (Algeria) Inès Ibbou; Walkover	(Germany) Luisa Meyer auf der Heide (Netherlands) Lexie Stevens	(Algeria) Lynda Benkaddour; Aglaya Fedorova	(Germany) Luisa Meyer auf der Heide (Algeria) Inès Bekrar (Sweden) Louise Brunskog (Denmark) Elena Jamshidi
May 23	Annenheim, Austria; Clay; W15; Singles and doubles draws	(Germany) Silvia Ambrosio; 6–1, 6–4	Valeriia Olianovskaia	(Japan) Miharu Imanishi (Slovenia) Tina Cvetkovič	(Slovakia) Ingrid Vojčináková; Anna Zyryanova (Italy) Federica Rossi (Romania) Arina Vasilescu
May 23	Annenheim, Austria; Clay; W15; Singles and doubles draws	(Japan) Miharu Imanishi (Japan) Kanako Morisaki; 6–2, 6–4	(Switzerland) Sebastianna Scilipoti (Slovakia) Ingrid Vojčináková	(Japan) Miharu Imanishi (Slovenia) Tina Cvetkovič	(Slovakia) Ingrid Vojčináková; Anna Zyryanova (Italy) Federica Rossi (Romania) Arina Vasilescu
May 23	Heraklion, Greece; Clay; W15; Singles and doubles draws	(Serbia) Lola Radivojević; 6–0, 6–2	(Greece) Dimitra Pavlou	(Belgium) Tilwith Di Girolami (Australia) Gabriella Da Silva-Fick	(Spain) Noelia Bouzó Zanotti (Lithuania) Iveta Dapkutė (Romania) Simona Ogescu (Greece) Elena Korokozidi
May 23	Heraklion, Greece; Clay; W15; Singles and doubles draws	(Spain) Noelia Bouzó Zanotti (Bulgaria) Ani Vangelova; 3–6, 6–4, [10–4]	(Greece) Elena Korokozidi (Greece) Ellie Logotheti	(Belgium) Tilwith Di Girolami (Australia) Gabriella Da Silva-Fick	(Spain) Noelia Bouzó Zanotti (Lithuania) Iveta Dapkutė (Romania) Simona Ogescu (Greece) Elena Korokozidi
May 23	Cancún, Mexico; Hard; W15; Singles and doubles draws	(Canada) Stacey Fung; 6–4, 7–5	(Japan) Saki Imamura	(Serbia) Katarina Kozarov (United States) Dasha Ivanova	(Mexico) Victoria Rodríguez (Mexico) Lya Isabel Fernández Olivares (Hong Kong) Wu Ho-ching (Mexico) Jessica Hinojosa Gómez
May 23	Cancún, Mexico; Hard; W15; Singles and doubles draws	(United States) Sophia Graver (United States) Malkia Ngounoue; 6–2, 6–4	(Canada) Stacey Fung (United States) Dasha Ivanova	(Serbia) Katarina Kozarov (United States) Dasha Ivanova	(Mexico) Victoria Rodríguez (Mexico) Lya Isabel Fernández Olivares (Hong Kong) Wu Ho-ching (Mexico) Jessica Hinojosa Gómez
May 23	Krško, Slovenia; Clay; W15; Singles and doubles draws	(Czech Republic) Aneta Kučmová; 7–5, 6–1	(Slovenia) Kristina Novak	(Italy) Enola Chiesa (United States) Jessie Aney	(Slovenia) Živa Falkner (Switzerland) Nadine Keller (Hungary) Natália Szabanin (Switzerland) Bojana Klincov
May 23	Krško, Slovenia; Clay; W15; Singles and doubles draws	(Czech Republic) Aneta Kučmová (Slovenia) Manca Pislak; 6–1, 6–2	Victoria Borodulina (United Kingdom) Sashi Kempster	(Italy) Enola Chiesa (United States) Jessie Aney	(Slovenia) Živa Falkner (Switzerland) Nadine Keller (Hungary) Natália Szabanin (Switzerland) Bojana Klincov
May 23	Santa Margarida de Montbui, Spain; Hard; W15; Singles and doubles draws	(France) Nahia Berecoechea; 7–6^{(7–5)}, 6–3	(Spain) Olga Parres Azcoitia	(Malta) Francesca Curmi (France) Chloé Noël	(Spain) Celia Cerviño Ruiz (Spain) Alba Rey García (Serbia) Mihaela Đaković (Spain) Lucía Cortez Llorca
May 23	Santa Margarida de Montbui, Spain; Hard; W15; Singles and doubles draws	(South Korea) Shin Ji-ho (Republic of Ireland) Celine Simunyu; 7–6^{(7–3)}, 6–3	(Malta) Francesca Curmi (Serbia) Mihaela Đaković	(Malta) Francesca Curmi (France) Chloé Noël	(Spain) Celia Cerviño Ruiz (Spain) Alba Rey García (Serbia) Mihaela Đaković (Spain) Lucía Cortez Llorca
May 23	Monastir, Tunisia; Hard; W15; Singles and doubles draws	(Japan) Ayumi Morita; 7–5, 6–0	Milana Zhabrailova	(United Kingdom) Jasmine Conway (Tunisia) Chiraz Bechri	(China) Xun Fangying (China) Yao Xinxin (Estonia) Helena Narmont (China) Wei Sijia
May 23	Monastir, Tunisia; Hard; W15; Singles and doubles draws	(China) Wei Sijia (China) Yao Xinxin; 6–3, 6–3	(Spain) Valeria Koussenkova; Milana Zhabrailova	(United Kingdom) Jasmine Conway (Tunisia) Chiraz Bechri	(China) Xun Fangying (China) Yao Xinxin (Estonia) Helena Narmont (China) Wei Sijia
May 23	Antalya, Turkey; Clay; W15; Singles and doubles draws	Tatiana Barkova; 7–6^{(7–4)}, 7–5	(Italy) Federica Bilardo	(Sweden) Vanessa Ersöz (Italy) Martina Colmegna	(Spain) Carlota Martínez Círez; Diana Demidova (Ukraine) Viktoriya Petrenko (Turkey) İlay Yörük
May 23	Antalya, Turkey; Clay; W15; Singles and doubles draws	(Ukraine) Viktoriya Petrenko (Turkey) Doğa Türkmen; 7–5, 6–7^{(3–7)}, [14–12]	(Hungary) Amarissa Kiara Tóth (Turkey) İlay Yörük	(Sweden) Vanessa Ersöz (Italy) Martina Colmegna	(Spain) Carlota Martínez Círez; Diana Demidova (Ukraine) Viktoriya Petrenko (Turkey) İlay Yörük
May 30	Surbiton Trophy; Surbiton, United Kingdom; Grass; W100; Singles – Doubles	(Belgium) Alison Van Uytvanck; 7–6^{(7–3)}, 6–2	(Australia) Arina Rodionova	(United States) CoCo Vandeweghe (United Kingdom) Jodie Burrage	(United States) Madison Brengle (Germany) Tatjana Maria (Romania) Mihaela Buzărnescu (Serbia) Natalija Stevanović
May 30	Surbiton Trophy; Surbiton, United Kingdom; Grass; W100; Singles – Doubles	(United States) Ingrid Neel (Netherlands) Rosalie van der Hoek; 6–3, 6–3	(Mexico) Fernanda Contreras (United States) Catherine Harrison	(United States) CoCo Vandeweghe (United Kingdom) Jodie Burrage	(United States) Madison Brengle (Germany) Tatjana Maria (Romania) Mihaela Buzărnescu (Serbia) Natalija Stevanović
May 30	Internazionali Femminili di Brescia; Brescia, Italy; Clay; W60; Singles – Doubles	(Spain) Ángela Fita Boluda; 6–2, 6–0	(Greece) Despina Papamichail	(Colombia) Yuliana Lizarazo (Germany) Anna-Lena Friedsam	(Switzerland) Ylena In-Albon (Italy) Sara Errani (Bulgaria) Julia Terziyska (Argentina) Jazmín Ortenzi
May 30	Internazionali Femminili di Brescia; Brescia, Italy; Clay; W60; Singles – Doubles	(Italy) Nuria Brancaccio (Italy) Lisa Pigato; 6–4, 6–1	(Kazakhstan) Zhibek Kulambayeva (Latvia) Diāna Marcinkēviča	(Colombia) Yuliana Lizarazo (Germany) Anna-Lena Friedsam	(Switzerland) Ylena In-Albon (Italy) Sara Errani (Bulgaria) Julia Terziyska (Argentina) Jazmín Ortenzi
May 30	Brașov Open; Brașov, Romania; Clay; W60; Singles – Doubles	(Australia) Jaimee Fourlis; 7–6^{(7–0)}, 6–2	(Turkey) İpek Öz	(Switzerland) Joanne Züger; Marina Melnikova	(Romania) Miriam Bulgaru (Spain) Andrea Lázaro García (Romania) Oana Georgeta Simion (Romania) Alexandra Cadanțu-Ignatik
May 30	Brașov Open; Brașov, Romania; Clay; W60; Singles – Doubles	(Czech Republic) Jesika Malečková (Bulgaria) Isabella Shinikova; 7–6^{(7–5)}, 6–3	(Slovenia) Veronika Erjavec (Poland) Weronika Falkowska	(Switzerland) Joanne Züger; Marina Melnikova	(Romania) Miriam Bulgaru (Spain) Andrea Lázaro García (Romania) Oana Georgeta Simion (Romania) Alexandra Cadanțu-Ignatik
May 30	Annenheim, Austria; Clay; W25; Singles and doubles draws	(Germany) Laura Siegemund; 6–3, 6–2	(Germany) Lena Papadakis	(Argentina) Julia Riera (Czech Republic) Barbora Palicová	(United States) Robin Montgomery (Burundi) Sada Nahimana (Austria) Sinja Kraus (United Kingdom) Matilda Mutavdzic
May 30	Annenheim, Austria; Clay; W25; Singles and doubles draws	(United States) Jessie Aney (Germany) Lena Papadakis; 1–6, 6–3, [11–9]	(Greece) Martha Matoula (Romania) Arina Vasilescu	(Argentina) Julia Riera (Czech Republic) Barbora Palicová	(United States) Robin Montgomery (Burundi) Sada Nahimana (Austria) Sinja Kraus (United Kingdom) Matilda Mutavdzic
May 30	Tbilisi, Georgia; Hard; W25; Singles and doubles draws	Anastasia Zakharova; 6–4, 6–0	Kristina Dmitruk	(Bosnia and Herzegovina) Nefisa Berberović (South Korea) Park So-hyun	Anastasia Zolotareva (China) Lu Jiajing; Ekaterina Yashina; Darya Astakhova
May 30	Tbilisi, Georgia; Hard; W25; Singles and doubles draws	Angelina Gabueva; Anastasia Zakharova; 6–1, 6–2	Darya Astakhova; Anna Kubareva	(Bosnia and Herzegovina) Nefisa Berberović (South Korea) Park So-hyun	Anastasia Zolotareva (China) Lu Jiajing; Ekaterina Yashina; Darya Astakhova
May 30	Changwon, South Korea; Hard; W25; Singles and doubles draws	(Japan) Kurumi Nara; 6–3, 6–1	(South Korea) Han Na-lae	(South Korea) Kim Da-bin (Australia) Olivia Tjandramulia	(Japan) Nana Kawagishi (Canada) Carol Zhao (South Korea) Cherry Kim (South Korea) Back Da-yeon
May 30	Changwon, South Korea; Hard; W25; Singles and doubles draws	(South Korea) Choi Ji-hee (South Korea) Han Na-lae; 6–3, 4–6, [15–13]	(Chinese Taipei) Lee Ya-hsuan (Chinese Taipei) Wu Fang-hsien	(South Korea) Kim Da-bin (Australia) Olivia Tjandramulia	(Japan) Nana Kawagishi (Canada) Carol Zhao (South Korea) Cherry Kim (South Korea) Back Da-yeon
May 30	Chiang Rai, Thailand; Hard; W25; Singles and doubles draws	(China) Gao Xinyu; 6–3, 6–3	(Thailand) Peangtarn Plipuech	(Japan) Nao Hibino (Thailand) Luksika Kumkhum	(Thailand) Patcharin Cheapchandej (Thailand) Anchisa Chanta (India) Karman Thandi (Japan) Haruna Arakawa
May 30	Chiang Rai, Thailand; Hard; W25; Singles and doubles draws	(Japan) Momoko Kobori (Thailand) Luksika Kumkhum; 6–3, 6–3	(Japan) Misaki Matsuda (Japan) Naho Sato	(Japan) Nao Hibino (Thailand) Luksika Kumkhum	(Thailand) Patcharin Cheapchandej (Thailand) Anchisa Chanta (India) Karman Thandi (Japan) Haruna Arakawa
May 30	Heraklion, Greece; Clay; W15; Singles and doubles draws	(Sweden) Kajsa Rinaldo Persson; 4–6, 6–4, 6–4	(Slovakia) Irina Balus	(Greece) Galateia Mesochoritou (Romania) Simona Ogescu	(Bulgaria) Beatris Spasova (Greece) Eleni Christofi (Romania) Anastasia Safta (Italy) Arianna Zucchini
May 30	Heraklion, Greece; Clay; W15; Singles and doubles draws	(Greece) Eleni Christofi (Australia) Gabriella Da Silva-Fick; 6–0, 6–1	(Ukraine) Mariia Bergen (Bulgaria) Beatris Spasova	(Greece) Galateia Mesochoritou (Romania) Simona Ogescu	(Bulgaria) Beatris Spasova (Greece) Eleni Christofi (Romania) Anastasia Safta (Italy) Arianna Zucchini
May 30	Cancún, Mexico; Hard; W15; Singles and doubles draws	(Canada) Stacey Fung; 6–3, 6–3	(Japan) Saki Imamura	(Ecuador) Mell Reasco (Mexico) Victoria Rodríguez	(Hong Kong) Maggie Ng (Spain) Mercedes Aristegui (Mexico) Jessica Hinojosa Gómez (United States) Madison Sieg
May 30	Cancún, Mexico; Hard; W15; Singles and doubles draws	Doubles competition was abandoned due to ongoing poor weather		(Ecuador) Mell Reasco (Mexico) Victoria Rodríguez	(Hong Kong) Maggie Ng (Spain) Mercedes Aristegui (Mexico) Jessica Hinojosa Gómez (United States) Madison Sieg
May 30	Čatež ob Savi, Slovenia; Clay; W15; Singles and doubles draws	(United States) Vivian Wolff; 6–2, 6–7^{(0–7)}, 6–4	(Poland) Ania Hertel	(France) Laïa Petretic (Slovakia) Bianca Behúlová	(Hungary) Vanda Lukács (Czech Republic) Ivana Šebestová (Hungary) Adrienn Nagy (Italy) Federica Arcidiacono
May 30	Čatež ob Savi, Slovenia; Clay; W15; Singles and doubles draws	(Chinese Taipei) Li Yu-yun; Anna Zyryanova; 6–4, 7–5	(Slovakia) Bianca Behúlová (Slovakia) Katarína Kužmová	(France) Laïa Petretic (Slovakia) Bianca Behúlová	(Hungary) Vanda Lukács (Czech Republic) Ivana Šebestová (Hungary) Adrienn Nagy (Italy) Federica Arcidiacono
May 30	Monastir, Tunisia; Hard; W15; Singles and doubles draws	(France) Alice Tubello; 6–3, 7–6^{(7–4)}	(Japan) Honoka Kobayashi	(France) Manon Léonard; Milana Zhabrailova	(China) Wei Sijia (United Kingdom) Jasmine Conway (Australia) Annerly Poulos (China) Han Xinyun
May 30	Monastir, Tunisia; Hard; W15; Singles and doubles draws	(United Kingdom) Kristina Paskauskas (China) Wei Sijia; 6–1, 6–2	(India) Ashmitha Easwaramurthi (Japan) Mei Hasegawa	(France) Manon Léonard; Milana Zhabrailova	(China) Wei Sijia (United Kingdom) Jasmine Conway (Australia) Annerly Poulos (China) Han Xinyun
May 30	Rancho Santa Fe, United States; Hard; W15; Singles and doubles draws	(Australia) Talia Gibson; 7–6^{(7–4)}, 3–6, 7–6^{(7–5)}	Maria Kozyreva	(Chinese Taipei) Yang Ya-yi (Thailand) Bunyawi Thamchaiwat	(United States) Megan McCray (Ukraine) Sabina Zeynalova (China) Han Jiangxue (United States) Solymar Colling
May 30	Rancho Santa Fe, United States; Hard; W15; Singles and doubles draws	Maria Kozyreva; Veronica Miroshnichenko; 6–1, 6–3	(United States) Solymar Colling (Spain) Claudia de Las Heras Armenteras	(Chinese Taipei) Yang Ya-yi (Thailand) Bunyawi Thamchaiwat	(United States) Megan McCray (Ukraine) Sabina Zeynalova (China) Han Jiangxue (United States) Solymar Colling

=== June ===
Week of	Tournament	Winner	Runners-up	Semifinalists	Quarterfinalists
June 6	Carinthian Ladies Lake's Trophy; Pörtschach am Wörthersee, Austria; Clay; W60; Singles – Doubles	(Germany) Laura Siegemund; 6–2, 6–2	(Slovakia) Viktória Kužmová	(Slovenia) Dalila Jakupović (Switzerland) Stefanie Vögele	(Hungary) Panna Udvardy (North Macedonia) Lina Gjorcheska (Austria) Barbara Haas (Austria) Sinja Kraus
June 6	Carinthian Ladies Lake's Trophy; Pörtschach am Wörthersee, Austria; Clay; W60; Singles – Doubles	(United States) Jessie Aney (Czech Republic) Anna Sisková; 6–3, 6–4	(Switzerland) Jenny Dürst (Poland) Weronika Falkowska	(Slovenia) Dalila Jakupović (Switzerland) Stefanie Vögele	(Hungary) Panna Udvardy (North Macedonia) Lina Gjorcheska (Austria) Barbara Haas (Austria) Sinja Kraus
June 6	Open de Biarritz; Biarritz, France; Clay; W60; Singles – Doubles	(Germany) Mina Hodzic; 6–3, 6–3	(France) Lucie Nguyen Tan	(Argentina) María Lourdes Carlé; Erika Andreeva	(France) Chloé Paquet (France) Audrey Albié (Japan) Yuki Naito (Kazakhstan) Anna Danilina
June 6	Open de Biarritz; Biarritz, France; Clay; W60; Singles – Doubles	(Kazakhstan) Anna Danilina (Ukraine) Valeriya Strakhova; 2–6, 6–3, [14–12]	(Argentina) María Lourdes Carlé; Maria Timofeeva	(Argentina) María Lourdes Carlé; Erika Andreeva	(France) Chloé Paquet (France) Audrey Albié (Japan) Yuki Naito (Kazakhstan) Anna Danilina
June 6	Internazionali Femminili di Tennis Città di Caserta; Caserta, Italy; Clay; W60; Singles – Doubles	(France) Kristina Mladenovic; 6–4, 4–6, 7–6^{(7–3)}	(Italy) Camilla Rosatello	(Italy) Nuria Brancaccio (Japan) Moyuka Uchijima	(Italy) Federica Di Sarra (Latvia) Daniela Vismane (Italy) Diletta Cherubini (Italy) Lisa Pigato
June 6	Internazionali Femminili di Tennis Città di Caserta; Caserta, Italy; Clay; W60; Singles – Doubles	(Greece) Despina Papamichail (Italy) Camilla Rosatello; 4–6, 6–2, [10–6]	(Portugal) Francisca Jorge (Portugal) Matilde Jorge	(Italy) Nuria Brancaccio (Japan) Moyuka Uchijima	(Italy) Federica Di Sarra (Latvia) Daniela Vismane (Italy) Diletta Cherubini (Italy) Lisa Pigato
June 6	Santo Domingo, Dominican Republic; Hard; W25; Singles and doubles draws	Jana Kolodynska; 6–0, ret.	(United States) Victoria Duval	(United States) Maria Mateas (Mexico) Ana Sofía Sánchez	(Ecuador) Mell Reasco (United States) Dasha Ivanova (Japan) Hiroko Kuwata (United States) Hina Inoue
June 6	Santo Domingo, Dominican Republic; Hard; W25; Singles and doubles draws	(France) Tiphanie Fiquet (Ecuador) Mell Reasco; 6–4, 6–4	(United States) Hina Inoue (United States) Taylor Ng	(United States) Maria Mateas (Mexico) Ana Sofía Sánchez	(Ecuador) Mell Reasco (United States) Dasha Ivanova (Japan) Hiroko Kuwata (United States) Hina Inoue
June 6	Tbilisi, Georgia; Hard; W25; Singles and doubles draws	Anastasia Zakharova; 6–2, 3–6, 6–2	Darya Astakhova	(South Korea) Park So-hyun; Anastasia Zolotareva	(Turkey) Berfu Cengiz (China) Lu Jiajing; Anna Kubareva (Latvia) Darja Semenistaja
June 6	Tbilisi, Georgia; Hard; W25; Singles and doubles draws	Angelina Gabueva; Anastasia Zakharova; 6–4, 6–3	Polina Kudermetova; Sofya Lansere	(South Korea) Park So-hyun; Anastasia Zolotareva	(Turkey) Berfu Cengiz (China) Lu Jiajing; Anna Kubareva (Latvia) Darja Semenistaja
June 6	Incheon, South Korea; Hard; W25; Singles and doubles draws	(Canada) Carol Zhao; 6–4, 6–1	(Japan) Mayuka Aikawa	(South Korea) Han Na-lae (Chinese Taipei) Lee Ya-hsuan	(Japan) Nana Kawagishi (South Korea) Wi Hwi-won (Australia) Olivia Tjandramulia (South Korea) Jeong Bo-young
June 6	Incheon, South Korea; Hard; W25; Singles and doubles draws	(South Korea) Choi Ji-hee (South Korea) Han Na-lae; 5–7, 6–4, [10–6]	(Chinese Taipei) Lee Ya-hsuan (Chinese Taipei) Wu Fang-hsien	(South Korea) Han Na-lae (Chinese Taipei) Lee Ya-hsuan	(Japan) Nana Kawagishi (South Korea) Wi Hwi-won (Australia) Olivia Tjandramulia (South Korea) Jeong Bo-young
June 6	Madrid, Spain; Hard; W25; Singles and doubles draws	(Australia) Jaimee Fourlis; 6–4, 6–2	(Spain) Guiomar Maristany	(Canada) Katherine Sebov (France) Alice Robbe	(Denmark) Olga Helmi (Hong Kong) Adithya Karunaratne (Philippines) Alex Eala (Spain) Jéssica Bouzas Maneiro
June 6	Madrid, Spain; Hard; W25; Singles and doubles draws	(Spain) Yvonne Cavallé Reimers (Spain) Guiomar Maristany; 6–4, 6–4	(Sweden) Jacqueline Cabaj Awad; Valeria Savinykh	(Canada) Katherine Sebov (France) Alice Robbe	(Denmark) Olga Helmi (Hong Kong) Adithya Karunaratne (Philippines) Alex Eala (Spain) Jéssica Bouzas Maneiro
June 6	Chiang Rai, Thailand; Hard; W25; Singles and doubles draws	(China) Gao Xinyu; 6–1, 1–6, 6–3	(Japan) Nao Hibino	(India) Rutuja Bhosale (Japan) Momoko Kobori	(Japan) Kyōka Okamura (Thailand) Patcharin Cheapchandej (Japan) Chihiro Muramatsu (India) Ankita Raina
June 6	Chiang Rai, Thailand; Hard; W25; Singles and doubles draws	(India) Rutuja Bhosale (Japan) Erika Sema; 6–1, 6–3	(Japan) Haruna Arakawa (Japan) Natsuho Arakawa	(India) Rutuja Bhosale (Japan) Momoko Kobori	(Japan) Kyōka Okamura (Thailand) Patcharin Cheapchandej (Japan) Chihiro Muramatsu (India) Ankita Raina
June 6	Banja Luka, Bosnia and Herzegovina; Clay; W15; Singles and doubles draws	(Czech Republic) Aneta Kučmová; 6–3, 6–2	(Slovakia) Katarína Kužmová	(Czech Republic) Denisa Hindová (Croatia) Lucija Ćirić Bagarić	(Germany) Chantal Sauvant (Serbia) Mia Ristić (Slovakia) Bianca Behúlová (Serbia) Elena Milovanović
June 6	Banja Luka, Bosnia and Herzegovina; Clay; W15; Singles and doubles draws	(Slovakia) Katarína Kužmová (France) Nina Radovanovic; 6–4, 6–2	(Germany) Laura Böhner (Italy) Giorgia Pinto	(Czech Republic) Denisa Hindová (Croatia) Lucija Ćirić Bagarić	(Germany) Chantal Sauvant (Serbia) Mia Ristić (Slovakia) Bianca Behúlová (Serbia) Elena Milovanović
June 6	Norges-la-Ville, France; Hard; W15; Singles and doubles draws	(France) Alice Tubello; 4–6, 6–0, 6–3	(France) Inès Nicault	(Luxembourg) Eléonora Molinaro (France) Jade Bornay	(Ukraine) Veronika Podrez (France) Aubane Droguet (France) Caroline Roméo (France) Manon Léonard
June 6	Norges-la-Ville, France; Hard; W15; Singles and doubles draws	Anastasiia Gureva (Argentina) Luciana Moyano; 6–0, 6–0	Natalia Orlova (France) Lucie Wargnier	(Luxembourg) Eléonora Molinaro (France) Jade Bornay	(Ukraine) Veronika Podrez (France) Aubane Droguet (France) Caroline Roméo (France) Manon Léonard
June 6	Monastir, Tunisia; Hard; W15; Singles and doubles draws	(Malta) Francesca Curmi; 6–2, 6–4	(China) Yao Xinxin	(China) Wei Sijia (France) Astrid Cirotte	(Spain) Eva Guerrero Álvarez (Egypt) Yasmin Ezzat (Chile) Fernanda Labraña; Milana Zhabrailova
June 6	Monastir, Tunisia; Hard; W15; Singles and doubles draws	(China) Wei Sijia (China) Yao Xinxin; 6–0, 6–1	(United Kingdom) Abigail Amos (Austria) Arabella Koller	(China) Wei Sijia (France) Astrid Cirotte	(Spain) Eva Guerrero Álvarez (Egypt) Yasmin Ezzat (Chile) Fernanda Labraña; Milana Zhabrailova
June 6	San Diego, United States; Hard; W15; Singles and doubles draws	(China) Han Jiangxue; 6–2, 4–6, 6–4	(Chinese Taipei) Yang Ya-yi	(United States) Jessica Failla; Maria Kozyreva	(Mexico) Midori Castillo Meza (Poland) Daria Kuczer (Ukraine) Sabina Zeynalova (United States) Kimmi Hance
June 6	San Diego, United States; Hard; W15; Singles and doubles draws	(United States) Kimmi Hance (United States) Makenna Jones; 6–3, 6–3	Maria Kozyreva; Veronica Miroshnichenko	(United States) Jessica Failla; Maria Kozyreva	(Mexico) Midori Castillo Meza (Poland) Daria Kuczer (Ukraine) Sabina Zeynalova (United States) Kimmi Hance
June 13	Ilkley Trophy; Ilkley, United Kingdom; Grass; W100; Singles – Doubles	(Hungary) Dalma Gálfi; 7–5, 4–6, 6–3	(United Kingdom) Jodie Burrage	(United States) Katie Volynets (United Kingdom) Sonay Kartal	(Luxembourg) Mandy Minella (Poland) Maja Chwalińska (Ukraine) Daria Snigur (Switzerland) Simona Waltert
June 13	Ilkley Trophy; Ilkley, United Kingdom; Grass; W100; Singles – Doubles	(Australia) Lizette Cabrera (South Korea) Jang Su-jeong; 6–7^{(7–9)}, 6–0, [11–9]	(United Kingdom) Naiktha Bains (United Kingdom) Maia Lumsden	(United States) Katie Volynets (United Kingdom) Sonay Kartal	(Luxembourg) Mandy Minella (Poland) Maja Chwalińska (Ukraine) Daria Snigur (Switzerland) Simona Waltert
June 13	Macha Lake Open; Česká Lípa, Czech Republic; Clay; W60; Singles – Doubles	(Czech Republic) Sára Bejlek; 6–4, 6–4	(Czech Republic) Jesika Malečková	(Greece) Despina Papamichail (Slovakia) Rebecca Šramková	(North Macedonia) Lina Gjorcheska (Switzerland) Conny Perrin (Mexico) Renata Zarazúa (Czech Republic) Linda Nosková
June 13	Macha Lake Open; Česká Lípa, Czech Republic; Clay; W60; Singles – Doubles	(Czech Republic) Karolína Kubáňová (Czech Republic) Aneta Kučmová; 6–2, 7–6^{(11–9)}	(Italy) Nuria Brancaccio (Greece) Despina Papamichail	(Greece) Despina Papamichail (Slovakia) Rebecca Šramková	(North Macedonia) Lina Gjorcheska (Switzerland) Conny Perrin (Mexico) Renata Zarazúa (Czech Republic) Linda Nosková
June 13	Open ITF Arcadis Brezo Osuna; Madrid, Spain; Hard; W60; Singles – Doubles	(Spain) Marina Bassols Ribera; 6–4, 7–5	(Philippines) Alex Eala	(Hong Kong) Adithya Karunaratne (Canada) Katherine Sebov	(Chinese Taipei) Liang En-shuo (Hungary) Tímea Babos (Australia) Jaimee Fourlis (France) Carole Monnet
June 13	Open ITF Arcadis Brezo Osuna; Madrid, Spain; Hard; W60; Singles – Doubles	(Kazakhstan) Anna Danilina; Anastasia Tikhonova; 6–4, 6–2	(China) Lu Jiajing (China) You Xiaodi	(Hong Kong) Adithya Karunaratne (Canada) Katherine Sebov	(Chinese Taipei) Liang En-shuo (Hungary) Tímea Babos (Australia) Jaimee Fourlis (France) Carole Monnet
June 13	Pörtschach am Wörthersee, Austria; Clay; W25; Singles and doubles draws	(Austria) Sinja Kraus; 6–1, 1–6, 6–2	(Serbia) Ivana Jorović	Victoria Kan (Argentina) Paula Ormaechea	(Germany) Sina Herrmann (Czech Republic) Anna Sisková (Romania) Andreea Roșca (Croatia) Lea Bošković
June 13	Pörtschach am Wörthersee, Austria; Clay; W25; Singles and doubles draws	(Czech Republic) Michaela Bayerlová (Slovenia) Tina Cvetkovič; 6–3, 6–3	(Sweden) Caijsa Hennemann (Poland) Martyna Kubka	Victoria Kan (Argentina) Paula Ormaechea	(Germany) Sina Herrmann (Czech Republic) Anna Sisková (Romania) Andreea Roșca (Croatia) Lea Bošković
June 13	Santo Domingo, Dominican Republic; Hard; W25; Singles and doubles draws	(United States) Hurricane Tyra Black; 6–3, 6–3	Jana Kolodynska	(Ecuador) Mell Reasco (Chinese Taipei) Lee Pei-chi	(United States) Rachel Gailis (United States) Chanelle Van Nguyen (United States) Taylor Ng (Bulgaria) Gergana Topalova
June 13	Santo Domingo, Dominican Republic; Hard; W25; Singles and doubles draws	(Spain) Alicia Herrero Liñana (Argentina) Melany Krywoj; 6–2, 6–4	(Czech Republic) Gabriela Knutson (Slovakia) Katarína Strešnáková	(Ecuador) Mell Reasco (Chinese Taipei) Lee Pei-chi	(United States) Rachel Gailis (United States) Chanelle Van Nguyen (United States) Taylor Ng (Bulgaria) Gergana Topalova
June 13	Denain, France; Clay; W25; Singles and doubles draws	(Spain) Leyre Romero Gormaz; 6–4, 3–6, 6–4	(Spain) Aliona Bolsova	(Denmark) Sofia Samavati (France) Audrey Albié	(Algeria) Inès Ibbou (France) Julie Gervais (Germany) Katharina Hobgarski (France) Sara Cakarevic
June 13	Denain, France; Clay; W25; Singles and doubles draws	(Germany) Katharina Hobgarski (Ukraine) Valeriya Strakhova; 6–0, 6–4	(Latvia) Kamilla Bartone (Bosnia and Herzegovina) Anita Wagner	(Denmark) Sofia Samavati (France) Audrey Albié	(Algeria) Inès Ibbou (France) Julie Gervais (Germany) Katharina Hobgarski (France) Sara Cakarevic
June 13	Ra'anana, Israel; Hard; W25; Singles and doubles draws	Polina Kudermetova; 4–6, 6–4, 7–5	Maria Timofeeva	(Israel) Shavit Kimchi (Chinese Taipei) Lee Ya-hsuan	Sofya Lansere (United Kingdom) Emilie Lindh (Turkey) Berfu Cengiz (Japan) Chihiro Muramatsu
June 13	Ra'anana, Israel; Hard; W25; Singles and doubles draws	(Chinese Taipei) Lee Ya-hsuan (Chinese Taipei) Wu Fang-hsien; 6–3, 6–1	(Japan) Chihiro Muramatsu (Hungary) Rebeka Stolmár	(Israel) Shavit Kimchi (Chinese Taipei) Lee Ya-hsuan	Sofya Lansere (United Kingdom) Emilie Lindh (Turkey) Berfu Cengiz (Japan) Chihiro Muramatsu
June 13	Sumter, United States; Hard; W25; Singles and doubles draws	(United States) Sophie Chang; 6–2, 4–6, 7–6^{(7–5)}	(United States) Hanna Chang	(Northern Mariana Islands) Carol Young Suh Lee (Japan) Himeno Sakatsume	(United States) Nicole Coopersmith (United States) Ashlyn Krueger (United States) Peyton Stearns (United States) Ellie Douglas
June 13	Sumter, United States; Hard; W25; Singles and doubles draws	(United States) Kylie Collins (United States) Peyton Stearns; 6–3, 5–7, [10–7]	(United States) Allura Zamarripa (United States) Maribella Zamarripa	(Northern Mariana Islands) Carol Young Suh Lee (Japan) Himeno Sakatsume	(United States) Nicole Coopersmith (United States) Ashlyn Krueger (United States) Peyton Stearns (United States) Ellie Douglas
June 13	Chiang Rai, Thailand; Hard; W15; Singles and doubles draws	(Japan) Naho Sato; 6–4, 6–2	(Thailand) Mananchaya Sawangkaew	(Thailand) Punnin Kovapitukted (China) Xun Fangying	(China) Liu Fangzhou (Thailand) Patcharin Cheapchandej; Anastasia Sukhotina (Japan) Michika Ozeki
June 13	Chiang Rai, Thailand; Hard; W15; Singles and doubles draws	(Japan) Anri Nagata (Japan) Naho Sato; 6–2, 6–4	(China) Liu Fangzhou (China) Xun Fangying	(Thailand) Punnin Kovapitukted (China) Xun Fangying	(China) Liu Fangzhou (Thailand) Patcharin Cheapchandej; Anastasia Sukhotina (Japan) Michika Ozeki
June 13	Monastir, Tunisia; Hard; W15; Singles and doubles draws	(Malta) Francesca Curmi; 6–2, 4–6, 7–5	(Japan) Sayaka Ishii	(Japan) Yuka Hosoki (South Korea) Shin Ji-ho	(Spain) Eva Guerrero Álvarez (China) Yao Xinxin (Ecuador) Camila Romero (Lithuania) Andrė Lukošiūtė
June 13	Monastir, Tunisia; Hard; W15; Singles and doubles draws	(Chinese Taipei) Cho I-hsuan (Italy) Matilde Mariani; 7–5, 6–1	(France) Chloé Cirotte (France) Marie Villet	(Japan) Yuka Hosoki (South Korea) Shin Ji-ho	(Spain) Eva Guerrero Álvarez (China) Yao Xinxin (Ecuador) Camila Romero (Lithuania) Andrė Lukošiūtė
June 13	San Diego, United States; Hard; W15; Singles and doubles draws	(United States) Makenna Jones; 3–6, 6–3, 6–3	(United States) Megan McCray	(United States) Katherine Hui (Australia) Catherine Aulia	(United States) Kimmi Hance (United States) Solymar Colling (United States) Sara Daavettila (Chinese Taipei) Yang Ya-yi
June 13	San Diego, United States; Hard; W15; Singles and doubles draws	(Thailand) Bunyawi Thamchaiwat (Chinese Taipei) Yang Ya-yi; 6–3, 6–4	(United States) Sara Daavettila (United States) Makenna Jones	(United States) Katherine Hui (Australia) Catherine Aulia	(United States) Kimmi Hance (United States) Solymar Colling (United States) Sara Daavettila (Chinese Taipei) Yang Ya-yi
June 20	Périgueux, France; Clay; W25; Singles and doubles draws	(France) Séléna Janicijevic; 6–3, 6–2	(Germany) Katharina Hobgarski	Mirra Andreeva (France) Marine Partaud	(France) Audrey Albié (Venezuela) Andrea Gámiz (France) Lucie Wargnier (Ukraine) Valeriya Strakhova
June 20	Périgueux, France; Clay; W25; Singles and doubles draws	(Brazil) Rebeca Pereira (Chile) Daniela Seguel; 6–4, 6–1	(United Kingdom) Emily Appleton (Australia) Alexandra Osborne	Mirra Andreeva (France) Marine Partaud	(France) Audrey Albié (Venezuela) Andrea Gámiz (France) Lucie Wargnier (Ukraine) Valeriya Strakhova
June 20	Gurugram, India; Hard; W25; Singles and doubles draws	(India) Karman Thandi; 6–4, 2–6, 6–1	(Belgium) Sofia Costoulas	(Japan) Saki Imamura (Thailand) Punnin Kovapitukted	(Latvia) Diāna Marcinkēviča; Anna Ukolova (India) Vaidehi Chaudhari (India) Shrivalli Bhamidipaty
June 20	Gurugram, India; Hard; W25; Singles and doubles draws	(Japan) Saki Imamura (Indonesia) Priska Madelyn Nugroho; 6–4, 7–5	(Japan) Momoko Kobori (Japan) Misaki Matsuda	(Japan) Saki Imamura (Thailand) Punnin Kovapitukted	(Latvia) Diāna Marcinkēviča; Anna Ukolova (India) Vaidehi Chaudhari (India) Shrivalli Bhamidipaty
June 20	Ra'anana, Israel; Hard; W25; Singles and doubles draws	Maria Timofeeva; 6–1, 6–2	Valeria Savinykh	(Israel) Nicole Khirin; Polina Kudermetova	(United Kingdom) Emilie Lindh (Japan) Chihiro Muramatsu (Israel) Shavit Kimchi (Romania) Elena-Teodora Cadar
June 20	Ra'anana, Israel; Hard; W25; Singles and doubles draws	Sofya Lansere; Maria Timofeeva; 6–3, 7–6^{(7–5)}	(Romania) Elena-Teodora Cadar (Hungary) Fanny Stollár	(Israel) Nicole Khirin; Polina Kudermetova	(United Kingdom) Emilie Lindh (Japan) Chihiro Muramatsu (Israel) Shavit Kimchi (Romania) Elena-Teodora Cadar
June 20	Cantanhede, Portugal; Carpet; W25; Singles and doubles draws	(Portugal) Francisca Jorge; 7–5, 7–5	Vitalia Diatchenko	(Turkey) Pemra Özgen (Brazil) Ingrid Gamarra Martins	(Switzerland) Tess Sugnaux (Australia) Olivia Tjandramulia (Germany) Kathleen Kanev (Japan) Mana Ayukawa
June 20	Cantanhede, Portugal; Carpet; W25; Singles and doubles draws	(Indonesia) Jessy Rompies (Australia) Olivia Tjandramulia; 6–2, 7–6^{(7–1)}	(Brazil) Ingrid Gamarra Martins (United Kingdom) Emily Webley-Smith	(Turkey) Pemra Özgen (Brazil) Ingrid Gamarra Martins	(Switzerland) Tess Sugnaux (Australia) Olivia Tjandramulia (Germany) Kathleen Kanev (Japan) Mana Ayukawa
June 20	Prokuplje, Serbia; Clay; W25; Singles and doubles draws	(Hungary) Natália Szabanin; 6–4, 7–6^{(7–5)}	(Croatia) Tara Würth	(Croatia) Petra Marčinko (Spain) Leyre Romero Gormaz	(Czech Republic) Dominika Šalková (Romania) Ilona Georgiana Ghioroaie (Serbia) Lola Radivojević (Romania) Andreea Roșca
June 20	Prokuplje, Serbia; Clay; W25; Singles and doubles draws	(Kazakhstan) Zhibek Kulambayeva (India) Prarthana Thombare; Walkover	(Spain) Leyre Romero Gormaz (Croatia) Tara Würth	(Croatia) Petra Marčinko (Spain) Leyre Romero Gormaz	(Czech Republic) Dominika Šalková (Romania) Ilona Georgiana Ghioroaie (Serbia) Lola Radivojević (Romania) Andreea Roșca
June 20	Ystad, Sweden; Clay; W25; Singles and doubles draws	(Latvia) Darja Semenistaja; 3–6, 6–3, 6–1	(Denmark) Sofia Samavati	(Germany) Mona Barthel (Poland) Weronika Falkowska	(Mexico) Renata Zarazúa; Irina Khromacheva (Ukraine) Daria Lopatetska (Belgium) Marie Benoît
June 20	Ystad, Sweden; Clay; W25; Singles and doubles draws	(Sweden) Caijsa Hennemann (Poland) Martyna Kubka; 4–6, 7–5, [10–7]	(United States) Ashley Lahey (Sweden) Lisa Zaar	(Germany) Mona Barthel (Poland) Weronika Falkowska	(Mexico) Renata Zarazúa; Irina Khromacheva (Ukraine) Daria Lopatetska (Belgium) Marie Benoît
June 20	Klosters, Switzerland; Clay; W25; Singles and doubles draws	(Czech Republic) Brenda Fruhvirtová; 7–5, 7–5	(Czech Republic) Michaela Bayerlová	(Slovenia) Nina Potočnik (Czech Republic) Barbora Palicová	(Slovenia) Dalila Jakupović (Switzerland) Jenny Dürst (Romania) Georgia Crăciun (Germany) Emily Seibold
June 20	Klosters, Switzerland; Clay; W25; Singles and doubles draws	(Romania) Miriam Bulgaru (Czech Republic) Brenda Fruhvirtová; 6–0, 6–1	(Germany) Tayisiya Morderger (Germany) Yana Morderger	(Slovenia) Nina Potočnik (Czech Republic) Barbora Palicová	(Slovenia) Dalila Jakupović (Switzerland) Jenny Dürst (Romania) Georgia Crăciun (Germany) Emily Seibold
June 20	Wichita, United States; Hard; W25; Singles and doubles draws	(United States) Elizabeth Mandlik; 6–3, 6–3	(United States) Kayla Day	(United States) Samantha Crawford (United States) Adriana Reami	(United States) Jenna DeFalco (United States) Katrina Scott (United States) Peyton Stearns (United States) Ashlyn Krueger
June 20	Wichita, United States; Hard; W25; Singles and doubles draws	(United States) Allura Zamarripa (United States) Maribella Zamarripa; 6–4, 6–2	(United States) Carolyn Ansari (Canada) Ariana Arseneault	(United States) Samantha Crawford (United States) Adriana Reami	(United States) Jenna DeFalco (United States) Katrina Scott (United States) Peyton Stearns (United States) Ashlyn Krueger
June 20	Alkmaar, Netherlands; Clay; W15; Singles and doubles draws	(Estonia) Maileen Nuudi; 6–2, 5–7, 6–4	(United States) Chiara Scholl	(Lithuania) Klaudija Bubelytė (Netherlands) Lexie Stevens	Valeriia Olianovskaia (Germany) Julia Middendorf (Germany) Katharina Hering (Czech Republic) Denisa Hindová
June 20	Alkmaar, Netherlands; Clay; W15; Singles and doubles draws	Valeriia Olianovskaia (Poland) Stefania Rogozińska Dzik; 6–3, 5–7, [10–6]	(United States) Chiara Scholl (Netherlands) Lexie Stevens	(Lithuania) Klaudija Bubelytė (Netherlands) Lexie Stevens	Valeriia Olianovskaia (Germany) Julia Middendorf (Germany) Katharina Hering (Czech Republic) Denisa Hindová
June 20	Bucharest, Romania; Clay; W15; Singles and doubles draws	(Germany) Chantal Sauvant; 6–7^{(4–7)}, 6–3, 6–2	Anastasiia Gureva	(Romania) Cara Maria Meșter (Czech Republic) Denise Hrdinková	(Italy) Federica Bilardo (Italy) Miriana Tona (Bulgaria) Yoana Konstantinova (Slovakia) Bianca Behúlová
June 20	Bucharest, Romania; Clay; W15; Singles and doubles draws	(Romania) Simona Ogescu (Bulgaria) Mihaela Tsoneva; 6–4, 6–2	(Italy) Giorgia Pinto (Italy) Gaia Squarcialupi	(Romania) Cara Maria Meșter (Czech Republic) Denise Hrdinková	(Italy) Federica Bilardo (Italy) Miriana Tona (Bulgaria) Yoana Konstantinova (Slovakia) Bianca Behúlová
June 20	Chiang Rai, Thailand; Hard; W15; Singles and doubles draws	(Japan) Ramu Ueda; 2–6, 6–2, 7–6^{(7–3)}	(Thailand) Thasaporn Naklo	(Ukraine) Anastasiia Poplavska (Thailand) Anchisa Chanta	(China) Xun Fangying (Japan) Natsumi Kawaguchi (Thailand) Supapitch Kuearum (Japan) Anri Nagata
June 20	Chiang Rai, Thailand; Hard; W15; Singles and doubles draws	(Thailand) Chompoothip Jundakate (Thailand) Tamachan Momkoonthod; Walkover	(Thailand) Anchisa Chanta (Thailand) Patcharin Cheapchandej	(Ukraine) Anastasiia Poplavska (Thailand) Anchisa Chanta	(China) Xun Fangying (Japan) Natsumi Kawaguchi (Thailand) Supapitch Kuearum (Japan) Anri Nagata
June 20	Monastir, Tunisia; Hard; W15; Singles and doubles draws	(China) Wei Sijia; 6–3, 6–3	(Japan) Eri Shimizu	(Chile) Fernanda Labraña (Thailand) Mai Napatt Nirundorn	(Hungary) Vanda Lukács (China) Yao Xinxin (Czech Republic) Amélie Šmejkalová (Japan) Yuka Hosoki
June 20	Monastir, Tunisia; Hard; W15; Singles and doubles draws	(China) Wei Sijia (China) Yao Xinxin; 6–3, 6–3	(Japan) Yuka Hosoki (Japan) Eri Shimizu	(Chile) Fernanda Labraña (Thailand) Mai Napatt Nirundorn	(Hungary) Vanda Lukács (China) Yao Xinxin (Czech Republic) Amélie Šmejkalová (Japan) Yuka Hosoki
June 20	Colorado Springs, United States; Hard; W15; Singles and doubles draws	(Serbia) Katarina Kozarov; 6–3, 6–4	Veronica Miroshnichenko	(United States) Gianna Pielet (United States) Hibah Shaikh	(Chinese Taipei) Hsu Chieh-yu (United States) Ivana Corley (United States) Carmen Corley (United States) Paris Corley
June 20	Colorado Springs, United States; Hard; W15; Singles and doubles draws	(United States) Carmen Corley (United States) Ivana Corley; 7–6^{(7–4)}, 6–2	(Poland) Daria Kuczer; Veronica Miroshnichenko	(United States) Gianna Pielet (United States) Hibah Shaikh	(Chinese Taipei) Hsu Chieh-yu (United States) Ivana Corley (United States) Carmen Corley (United States) Paris Corley
June 27	LTP Charleston Pro Tennis; Charleston, United States; Clay; W100; Singles – Doubles	(Canada) Carol Zhao; 3–6, 6–4, 6–4	(Japan) Himeno Sakatsume	(United States) Sachia Vickery (United States) Maegan Manasse	(United States) Ashlyn Krueger (United States) Elizabeth Mandlik (Czech Republic) Linda Fruhvirtová (United States) Victoria Duval
June 27	LTP Charleston Pro Tennis; Charleston, United States; Clay; W100; Singles – Doubles	(United States) Alycia Parks (United States) Sachia Vickery; 6–4, 5–7, [10–5]	(Hungary) Tímea Babos (Mexico) Marcela Zacarías	(United States) Sachia Vickery (United States) Maegan Manasse	(United States) Ashlyn Krueger (United States) Elizabeth Mandlik (Czech Republic) Linda Fruhvirtová (United States) Victoria Duval
June 27	Open International Féminin de Montpellier; Montpellier, France; Clay; W60; Singles – Doubles	Oksana Selekhmeteva; 6–3, 5–7, 7–5	(Ukraine) Kateryna Baindl	(Brazil) Carolina Alves (Argentina) María Lourdes Carlé	(United States) Francesca Di Lorenzo (Japan) Moyuka Uchijima (Spain) Cristina Bucșa (Australia) Olivia Gadecki
June 27	Open International Féminin de Montpellier; Montpellier, France; Clay; W60; Singles – Doubles	(Venezuela) Andrea Gámiz (Spain) Andrea Lázaro García; 6–4, 2–6, [13–11]	(France) Estelle Cascino; Irina Khromacheva	(Brazil) Carolina Alves (Argentina) María Lourdes Carlé	(United States) Francesca Di Lorenzo (Japan) Moyuka Uchijima (Spain) Cristina Bucșa (Australia) Olivia Gadecki
June 27	Stuttgart-Vaihingen, Germany; Clay; W25; Singles and doubles draws	(Germany) Katharina Hobgarski; 7–5, 6–2	(Austria) Sinja Kraus	(Czech Republic) Michaela Bayerlová (Czech Republic) Aneta Kučmová	(Czech Republic) Anna Sisková (Romania) Miriam Bulgaru (Spain) Ángela Fita Boluda (Germany) Nicole Rivkin
June 27	Stuttgart-Vaihingen, Germany; Clay; W25; Singles and doubles draws	(Spain) Ángela Fita Boluda (Germany) Emily Seibold; 6–4, 7–6^{(7–5)}	(Poland) Weronika Falkowska (Czech Republic) Anna Sisková	(Czech Republic) Michaela Bayerlová (Czech Republic) Aneta Kučmová	(Czech Republic) Anna Sisková (Romania) Miriam Bulgaru (Spain) Ángela Fita Boluda (Germany) Nicole Rivkin
June 27	Gurugram, India; Hard; W25; Singles and doubles draws	(India) Sahaja Yamalapalli; 6–3, 7–6^{(7–5)}	(Slovakia) Viktória Morvayová	Ekaterina Yashina (India) Ankita Raina	(Japan) Saki Imamura (India) Vaidehi Chaudhari (India) Rutuja Bhosale (Thailand) Punnin Kovapitukted
June 27	Gurugram, India; Hard; W25; Singles and doubles draws	(Indonesia) Priska Madelyn Nugroho (India) Ankita Raina; 3–6, 6–0, [10–6]	(Japan) Momoko Kobori (Japan) Misaki Matsuda	Ekaterina Yashina (India) Ankita Raina	(Japan) Saki Imamura (India) Vaidehi Chaudhari (India) Rutuja Bhosale (Thailand) Punnin Kovapitukted
June 27	Tarvisio, Italy; Clay; W25; Singles and doubles draws	(Croatia) Tara Würth; 7–5, 6–0	(Croatia) Lea Bošković	(Slovenia) Dalila Jakupović (Italy) Camilla Rosatello	(Italy) Arianna Zucchini (Croatia) Petra Marčinko (Italy) Beatrice Ricci (Romania) Cristina Dinu
June 27	Tarvisio, Italy; Clay; W25; Singles and doubles draws	(Croatia) Lea Bošković (Slovenia) Veronika Erjavec; 6–1, 6–7^{(5–7)}, [10–7]	(Romania) Ilona Georgiana Ghioroaie (Romania) Oana Georgeta Simion	(Slovenia) Dalila Jakupović (Italy) Camilla Rosatello	(Italy) Arianna Zucchini (Croatia) Petra Marčinko (Italy) Beatrice Ricci (Romania) Cristina Dinu
June 27	The Hague, Netherlands; Clay; W25; Singles and doubles draws	(Hungary) Natália Szabanin; 7–6^{(7–3)}, 6–4	(Belgium) Magali Kempen	(Sweden) Caijsa Hennemann (Argentina) Nadia Podoroska	(Netherlands) Eva Vedder (Netherlands) Lexie Stevens (Argentina) Martina Capurro Taborda (Greece) Martha Matoula
June 27	The Hague, Netherlands; Clay; W25; Singles and doubles draws	(Netherlands) Jasmijn Gimbrère (Netherlands) Isabelle Haverlag; 6–2, 6–4	(United States) Nikki Redelijk (Netherlands) Bente Spee	(Sweden) Caijsa Hennemann (Argentina) Nadia Podoroska	(Netherlands) Eva Vedder (Netherlands) Lexie Stevens (Argentina) Martina Capurro Taborda (Greece) Martha Matoula
June 27	Porto, Portugal; Hard; W25; Singles and doubles draws	(Turkey) Pemra Özgen; 6–3, 2–6, 6–2	(Spain) Eva Guerrero Álvarez	(Australia) Alana Parnaby (Georgia (country)) Mariam Bolkvadze	Vitalia Diatchenko (Germany) Kathleen Kanev (Japan) Sakura Hosogi (Portugal) Francisca Jorge
June 27	Porto, Portugal; Hard; W25; Singles and doubles draws	(Chinese Taipei) Lee Ya-hsuan (Chinese Taipei) Wu Fang-hsien; 5–7, 6–4, [10–1]	(China) Lu Jiajing (Australia) Alana Parnaby	(Australia) Alana Parnaby (Georgia (country)) Mariam Bolkvadze	Vitalia Diatchenko (Germany) Kathleen Kanev (Japan) Sakura Hosogi (Portugal) Francisca Jorge
June 27	Palma del Río, Spain; Hard; W25+H; Singles and doubles draws	(Spain) Marina Bassols Ribera; 5–7, 6–4, 6–3	(France) Jessika Ponchet	(Bulgaria) Gergana Topalova (Israel) Lina Glushko	(Ukraine) Daria Snigur (Uzbekistan) Nigina Abduraimova (Hungary) Fanny Stollár (Hong Kong) Adithya Karunaratne
June 27	Palma del Río, Spain; Hard; W25+H; Singles and doubles draws	Valeria Savinykh (Hungary) Fanny Stollár; 7–6^{(7–3)}, 6–2	(Spain) Celia Cerviño Ruiz (Lithuania) Justina Mikulskytė	(Bulgaria) Gergana Topalova (Israel) Lina Glushko	(Ukraine) Daria Snigur (Uzbekistan) Nigina Abduraimova (Hungary) Fanny Stollár (Hong Kong) Adithya Karunaratne
June 27	Columbus, United States; Hard; W25; Singles and doubles draws	(United States) Katrina Scott; 7–5, 6–3	(United States) Peyton Stearns	(Canada) Katherine Sebov (United States) Taylor Ng	(Japan) Hiroko Kuwata (Canada) Stacey Fung (United States) Jessica Failla (United States) Adriana Reami
June 27	Columbus, United States; Hard; W25; Singles and doubles draws	(Germany) Irina Cantos Siemers (United States) Sydni Ratliff; 6–2, 5–7, [10–4]	(United States) Madeline Atway (United States) Danielle Willson	(Canada) Katherine Sebov (United States) Taylor Ng	(Japan) Hiroko Kuwata (Canada) Stacey Fung (United States) Jessica Failla (United States) Adriana Reami
June 27	Prokuplje, Serbia; Clay; W15; Singles and doubles draws	(Serbia) Lola Radivojević; 6–2, 6–3	(Germany) Luisa Meyer auf der Heide	(Sweden) Maja Radenkovic (Canada) Marina Stakusic	(Romania) Ilinca Amariei; Daria Lodikova (Switzerland) Alina Granwehr; Ksenia Zaytseva
June 27	Prokuplje, Serbia; Clay; W15; Singles and doubles draws	(Bulgaria) Katerina Dimitrova; Maria Sholokhova; 7–6^{(7–4)}, 6–2	Polina Bakhmutkina; Daria Lodikova	(Sweden) Maja Radenkovic (Canada) Marina Stakusic	(Romania) Ilinca Amariei; Daria Lodikova (Switzerland) Alina Granwehr; Ksenia Zaytseva
June 27	Monastir, Tunisia; Hard; W15; Singles and doubles draws	(France) Manon Léonard; 6–2, 6–2	(France) Yasmine Mansouri	(India) Jennifer Luikham (China) Wei Sijia	(Italy) Chaira Girelli (Austria) Tamira Paszek (China) Yao Xinxin (Japan) Honoka Kobayashi
June 27	Monastir, Tunisia; Hard; W15; Singles and doubles draws	(Japan) Yuka Hosoki (Japan) Eri Shimizu; 6–3, 6–2	(Tunisia) Diana Chehoudi (France) Yasmine Mansouri	(India) Jennifer Luikham (China) Wei Sijia	(Italy) Chaira Girelli (Austria) Tamira Paszek (China) Yao Xinxin (Japan) Honoka Kobayashi
June 27	Los Angeles, United States; Hard; W15; Singles and doubles draws	(United States) Eryn Cayetano; 5–7, 6–4, 6–3	(United States) Iva Jovic	(Chinese Taipei) Yang Ya-yi (United States) Kimmi Hance	(United States) Taylor Cataldi (Poland) Daria Kuczer; Alina Shcherbinina (China) Han Jiangxue
June 27	Los Angeles, United States; Hard; W15; Singles and doubles draws	(United States) Eryn Cayetano (United States) Salma Ewing; 6–3, 4–6, [10–8]	(Thailand) Bunyawi Thamchaiwat (Chinese Taipei) Yang Ya-yi	(Chinese Taipei) Yang Ya-yi (United States) Kimmi Hance	(United States) Taylor Cataldi (Poland) Daria Kuczer; Alina Shcherbinina (China) Han Jiangxue
