= Brașov Open =

- 2022 Brașov Open

Women's World Tennis Tour
- Event name: Brașov Open
- Location: Brașov, Romania
- Venue: Tenis Club Olimpia
- Category: ITF Women's World Tennis Tour
- Surface: Clay / outdoor
- Draw: 32S/32Q/16D
- Prize money: $60,000

The Brașov Open is a tournament for professional female tennis players played on outdoor clay courts. The event is classified as a $60,000 ITF Women's World Tennis Tour tournament and has been held in Brașov, Romania, since 2022.

== Past finals ==
=== Singles ===
Year	Champion	Runner-up	Score
2026 (2)	(Romania) Alesia Breaz	(Ukraine) Daria Lopatetska	3–6, 6–2, 6–1
2026 (1)	(United States) Ashley Lahey	(Romania) Ilinca Amariei	4–6, 6–2, 7–5
2025 (2)	(Spain) Ángela Fita Boluda	(Czech Republic) Julie Štruplová	7–5, 6–4
2025 (1)	(Romania) Elena Ruxandra Bertea	(Romania) Bianca Elena Bărbulescu	6–1, 6–3
2024 (2)	(Slovakia) Nina Vargová	(Romania) Oana Gavrilă	6–0, 7–6^{(7–5)}
2024 (1)	(Romania) Patricia Maria Țig	(Romania) Georgia Crăciun	6–2, 6–2
2023 (2)	(Ukraine) Alisa Baranovska	(Italy) Nicole Fossa Huergo	6–3, 6–3
2023 (1)	(Romania) Maria Sara Popa	(Romania) Selma Ștefania Cadar	5–7, 6–2, 7–5
2022	(Australia) Jaimee Fourlis	(Turkey) İpek Öz	7–6^{(7–0)}, 6–2

=== Doubles ===
Year	Champions	Runners-up	Score
2026 (2)	(Romania) Alesia Breaz (Romania) Cristiana Nicoleta Todoni	(Romania) Simona Ogescu (Romania) Ana Ioana Vârșa	6–7^{(5–7)}, 6–3, [10–6]
2026 (1)	(Spain) Cristina Díaz Adrover (Italy) Angelica Raggi	(Romania) Simona Ogescu (Romania) Ana Ioana Vârșa	6–2, 6–1
2025 (2)	(Romania) Ștefania Bojică (Romania) Briana Szabó	(Japan) Kanako Morisaki (Japan) Akiko Omae	5–7, 6–2, [10–7]
2025 (1)	(Romania) Alexandra Irina Anghel (Romania) Carmen Andreea Herea	(Italy) Angelica Raggi (Italy) Jennifer Ruggeri	6–3, 6–2
2024 (2)	Ksenia Laskutova (Slovakia) Nina Vargová	(Ukraine) Maryna Kolb (Ukraine) Nadiia Kolb	6–3, 6–4
2024 (1)	(Romania) Ștefania Bojică (Romania) Mara Gae	(Romania) Ilinca Amariei (Czech Republic) Linda Ševčíková	6–4, 6–0
2023 (2)	(Romania) Simona Ogescu (Czech Republic) Linda Ševčíková	(Italy) Nicole Fossa Huergo (Bulgaria) Julia Stamatova	7–6^{(10–8)}, 7–5
2023 (1)	(Italy) Nicole Fossa Huergo (Serbia) Bojana Marinković	(Romania) Bianca Elena Bărbulescu (Czech Republic) Linda Ševčíková	6–2, 6–4
2022	(Czech Republic) Jesika Malečková (Bulgaria) Isabella Shinikova	(Slovenia) Veronika Erjavec (Poland) Weronika Falkowska	7–6^{(7–5)}, 6–3
