= 2022 Brașov Open =

Tennis tournament

- Date: 30 May–5 June 2022
- Edition: 1st
- Category: ITF Women's World Tennis Tour
- Prize money: $60,000
- Surface: Clay / Outdoor
- Location: Brașov, Romania

Champions

Singles
- (Australia) Jaimee Fourlis

Doubles
- (Czech Republic) Jesika Malečková / (Bulgaria) Isabella Shinikova
Brașov Open	· 2023 →

The 2022 Brașov Open was a professional tennis tournament played on outdoor clay courts. It was the first edition of the tournament which was part of the 2022 ITF Women's World Tennis Tour. It took place in Brașov, Romania between 30 May and 5 June 2022.

== Singles main draw entrants ==
=== Seeds ===
Country	Player	Rank^{1}	Seed
HUN	Panna Udvardy	90	1
ROU	Alexandra Cadanțu-Ignatik	150	2
ESP	Andrea Lázaro García	180	3
SVK	Viktória Kužmová	189	4
TUR	İpek Öz	192	5
	Marina Melnikova	198	6
SUI	Joanne Züger	216	7
AUS	Ellen Perez	222	8

- ^{1} Rankings are as of 23 May 2022.

=== Other entrants ===
The following players received wildcards into the singles main draw:

- (Romania) Ilinca Amariei
- (Romania) Georgia Crăciun
- (Romania) Maria Sara Popa
- (Romania) Vanessa Popa Teiușanu

The following players received entry from the qualifying draw:

- (France) Océane Babel
- (Romania) Miriam Bulgaru
- (Romania) Nicoleta Dascălu
- (Serbia) Ivana Jorović
- (South Africa) Isabella Kruger
- (France) Lucie Nguyen Tan
- (Switzerland) Sebastianna Scilipoti
- (Romania) Lavinia Tănăsie

== Champions ==
=== Singles ===
- (Australia) Jaimee Fourlis def. (Turkey) İpek Öz, 7–6^{(7–0)}, 6–2

=== Doubles ===
- (Czech Republic) Jesika Malečková / (Bulgaria) Isabella Shinikova def. (Slovenia) Veronika Erjavec / (Poland) Weronika Falkowska, 7–6^{(7–5)}, 6–3
