= 2022 Brașov Open – Singles =

Singles
- 2022 Brașov Open

Final
- Champion: (Australia) Jaimee Fourlis
- Runner-up: (Turkey) İpek Öz
- Score: 7–6^{(7–0)}, 6–2

Events
Singles	Doubles
Brașov Open	· 2023 →

This was the first edition of the tournament.

Jaimee Fourlis won the title, defeating İpek Öz in the final, 7–6^{(7–0)}, 6–2.

== Seeds ==
1. (Hungary) Panna Udvardy (first round)
2. (Romania) Alexandra Cadanțu-Ignatik (quarterfinals)
3. (Spain) Andrea Lázaro García (quarterfinals)
4. (Slovakia) Viktória Kužmová (first round)
5. (Turkey) İpek Öz (final)
6. Marina Melnikova (semifinals, retired)
7. (Switzerland) Joanne Züger (semifinals)
8. (Australia) Ellen Perez (first round)

== Draw ==
=== Key ===
- Q = Qualifier
- WC = Wild card
- LL = Lucky loser
- Alt = Alternate
- SE = Special exempt
- PR = Protected ranking
- ITF = ITF entry
- JE = Junior exempt
- w/o = Walkover
- r = Retired
- d = Defaulted
- SR = Special ranking

=== Finals ===
Semifinals
(Australia) Jaimee Fourlis	6	6
7	(Switzerland) Joanne Züger	2	1
5	(Turkey) İpek Öz	6	0
6	Marina Melnikova	1	0^{r}

Final
(Australia) Jaimee Fourlis	7^{7}	6
5	(Turkey) İpek Öz	6^{0}	2

=== Top half ===
First round
1	(Hungary) P Udvardy	6	6^{5}	1
(Australia) P Hon	2	7^{7}	6
Q	(Romania) M Bulgaru	6	6
(Romania) A Roșca	3	2
Q	(Romania) N Dascălu	2	3
(Australia) J Fourlis	6	6
Q	(France) O Babel	6	6
8	(Australia) E Perez	4	3
3	(Spain) A Lázaro García	7	6
Q	(Romania) L Tănăsie	5	4
(Hong Kong) E Chong	6^{4}	7^{8}	6
Q	(France) L Nguyen Tan	7^{7}	6^{6}	2
(Bulgaria) I Shinikova	6^{1}	6^{3}
(Romania) IL Roșca	7^{7}	7^{7}
(Poland) W Falkowska	6	1	0
7	(Switzerland) J Züger	0	6	6

Second round
(Australia) P Hon	6	3	5
Q	(Romania) M Bulgaru	0	6	7
(Australia) J Fourlis	6	6
Q	(France) O Babel	3	2
3	(Spain) A Lázaro García	6	6
(Hong Kong) E Chong	1	1
(Romania) IL Roșca	2	3
7	(Switzerland) J Züger	6	6

Quarterfinals
Q	(Romania) M Bulgaru	2	2
(Australia) J Fourlis	6	6
3	(Spain) A Lázaro García	6	6^{0}	0
7	(Switzerland) J Züger	3	7^{7}	6

Semifinals
(Australia) J Fourlis	6	6
7	(Switzerland) J Züger	2	1

=== Bottom half ===
First round
5	(Turkey) İ Öz	7^{7}	6
WC	(Romania) G Crăciun	6^{5}	0
WC	(Romania) V Popa Teiușanu	1	2
Q	(Serbia) I Jorović	6	6
(Romania) C Dinu	5	4
(Romania) OG Simion	7	6
(Czech Republic) J Malečková	5	6	6
4	(Slovakia) V Kužmová	7	2	1
6	M Melnikova	6	6
WC	(Romania) I Amariei	1	3
(Romania) IG Ghioroaie	6	6
(Belgium) L Salden	2	3
WC	(Romania) MS Popa	0	5
Q	(South Africa) I Kruger	6	7
Q	(Switzerland) S Scilipoti	1	3
2	(Romania) A Cadanțu-Ignatik	6	6

Second round
5	(Turkey) İ Öz	6	6
Q	(Serbia) I Jorović	2	2
(Romania) OG Simion	7^{7}	4	6
(Czech Republic) J Malečková	6^{4}	6	4
6	M Melnikova	5
(Romania) IG Ghioroaie	1^{r}
Q	(South Africa) I Kruger	6	3	5
2	(Romania) A Cadanțu-Ignatik	1	6	7

Quarterfinals
5	(Turkey) İ Öz	6	6
(Romania) OG Simion	3	4
6	M Melnikova	4	6	6
2	(Romania) A Cadanțu-Ignatik	6	2	3

Semifinals
5	(Turkey) İ Öz	6	0
6	M Melnikova	1	0^{r}
