= 2022 Brașov Open – Doubles =

Doubles
- 2022 Brașov Open

Final
- Champions: (Czech Republic) Jesika Malečková (Bulgaria) Isabella Shinikova
- Runners-up: (Slovenia) Veronika Erjavec (Poland) Weronika Falkowska
- Score: 7–6^{(7–5)}, 6–3

Events
Singles	Doubles
Brașov Open	· 2023 →

This was the first edition of the tournament.

Jesika Malečková and Isabella Shinikova won the title, defeating Veronika Erjavec and Weronika Falkowska in the final, 7–6^{(7–5)}, 6–3.

== Seeds ==
1. (Hong Kong) Eudice Chong / (Belgium) Lara Salden (semifinals)
2. (Czech Republic) Jesika Malečková / (Bulgaria) Isabella Shinikova (champions)
3. (Romania) Cristina Dinu / (Romania) Andreea Roșca (first round)
4. (Slovenia) Veronika Erjavec / (Poland) Weronika Falkowska (final)

== Draw ==
=== Key ===
- Q = Qualifier
- WC = Wild card
- LL = Lucky loser
- Alt = Alternate
- SE = Special exempt
- PR = Protected ranking
- ITF = ITF entry
- JE = Junior exempt
- w/o = Walkover
- r = Retired
- d = Defaulted
- SR = Special ranking

=== Draw ===
First round
(Romania) I Amariei (Romania) V Popa Teiușanu	3	4
(Ukraine) M Kolb (Ukraine) N Kolb	6	6
4	(Slovenia) V Erjavec (Poland) W Falkowska	6	6
(Romania) A Iordachi (Romania) Ș Lazăr	1	1
(Romania) CA Herea (Romania) A Iordache	4	1
(France) O Babel (France) L Nguyen Tan	6	6
(Romania) O Gavrilă (Turkey) İ Öz	6	6
(China) S Ma (Romania) L Tănăsie	3	4
(Romania) M Bulgaru (Romania) G Crăciun	6^{6}	6	[10]
3	(Romania) C Dinu (Romania) A Roșca	7^{8}	4	[8]
WC	(Romania) AM Brotea (Bulgaria) A Karatancheva	3	3
(Bulgaria) L Karatancheva (Romania) DM Mihail	6	6
(Romania) Ș Bojica (Romania) B Szabó	2	0
2	(Czech Republic) J Malečková (Bulgaria) I Shinikova	6	6

Quarterfinals
1	(Hong Kong) E Chong (Belgium) L Salden	6	6
(Ukraine) M Kolb (Ukraine) N Kolb	3	1
4	(Slovenia) V Erjavec (Poland) W Falkowska	6	6
(France) O Babel (France) L Nguyen Tan	2	3
(Romania) O Gavrilă (Turkey) İ Öz	6	6
(Romania) M Bulgaru (Romania) G Crăciun	3	4
(Bulgaria) L Karatancheva (Romania) DM Mihail	3	3
2	(Czech Republic) J Malečková (Bulgaria) I Shinikova	6	6

Semifinals
1	(Hong Kong) E Chong (Belgium) L Salden	2	1
4	(Slovenia) V Erjavec (Poland) W Falkowska	6	6
(Romania) O Gavrilă (Turkey) İ Öz	6	2	[4]
2	(Czech Republic) J Malečková (Bulgaria) I Shinikova	3	6	[10]

Final
4	(Slovenia) V Erjavec (Poland) W Falkowska	6^{5}	3
2	(Czech Republic) J Malečková (Bulgaria) I Shinikova	7^{7}	6
