= Isabella Kruger =

South African tennis player

- Country (sports): South Africa
- Born: 30 March 2005 (age 21) Pretoria, South Africa
- Plays: Right-handed (two-handed backhand)
- Prize money: $32,496

Singles
- Career record: 92–56
- Career titles: 1 ITF
- Highest ranking: No. 330 (26 December 2022)
- Current ranking: No. 698 (30 December 2024)

Grand Slam singles results
- Wimbledon Junior: QF (2022)

Doubles
- Career record: 11–15
- Career titles: 0
- Highest ranking: No. 641 (15 July 2024)
- Current ranking: No. 707 (30 December 2024)

Team competitions
- BJK Cup: 8–2
- Last updated on: 30 December 2024.

Isabella Kruger is a South African tennis player. She has a career high singles ranking of No. 330 achieved on 26 December 2022. She is the daughter of former international rugby union player Ruben Kruger.

== Career ==
=== Juniors ===
She reached the quarter-finals of the Girls' singles at the 2022 Wimbledon Championships.

On 27 May 2025, Kruger joined to Auburn Tigers.

=== Professional ===
In 2023, she was selected as a teenager for the South African team in the Billie Jean King Cup. She made her debut in April 2023 as an 18-year-old against Estonia.

In February 2024, she was the number one ranked South African female tennis player. In March 2024, playing alongside her sister Zoë Kruger, she reached the final of the Wiphold International where they faced Alina Charaeva and Ekaterina Reyngold in the final, losing in three sets.

In June 2024, she competed for South Africa again in the Billie Jean King Cup.

== Personal life ==
Born in Pretoria, her father is South African former international rugby union player Ruben Kruger. Her sister Zoë Kruger is also a tennis player.

== ITF Circuit finals ==
=== Singles: 3 (1 title, 2 runner-ups) ===
Legend W25 tournaments (0–2) W15 tournaments (1–0)	Finals by surface Hard (1–1) Carpet (0–1)

Result	W–L	Date	Tournament	Tier	Surface	Opponent	Score
Loss	0–1	May 2022	ITF Tossa de Mar, Spain	W25+H	Carpet	(Spain) Rosa Vicens Mas	5–7, 3–6
Loss	0–2	Sep 2022	ITF Santarém, Portugal	W25	Hard	Vitalia Diatchenko	3–6, 2–6
Win	1–2	Jun 2024	ITF Hillcrest, South Africa	W15	Hard	(Japan) Michika Ozeki	6–2, 6–4

=== Doubles: 4 (1 title, 3 runner-ups) ===
Legend W50 tournaments (0–1) W35 tournaments (0–1) W15 tournaments (1–1)	Finals by surface Hard (1–3)

Result	W–L	Date	Tournament	Tier	Surface	Partner	Opponents	Score
Loss	0–1	Feb 2024	ITF Pretoria, South Africa	W50	Hard	(South Africa) Zoë Kruger	Alina Charaeva; Ekaterina Reyngold	0–6, 7–5, [3–10]
Loss	0–2	Jul 2024	ITF Hillcrest, South Africa	W35	Hard	(South Africa) Zoë Kruger	Ksenia Laskutova (Italy) Verena Meliss	2–6, 5–7
Loss	0–3	Sep 2026	ITF Nashville, United States	W15	Hard	(Denmark) Emma Kamper	(United Kingdom) Erin Pearce (United States) Mia Yamakita	6–1, 2–6, [8–10]
Win	1–3	Nov 2026	ITF Lincoln, United States	W15	Hard (i)	(Egypt) Merna Refaat	(United States) Jenna Dean; Maria Kononova	6–1, 7–5
