= 2019 FineMark Women's Pro Tennis Championship =

- Date: 6–12 May 2019
- Edition: 1st
- Category: ITF Women's World Tennis Tour
- Prize money: $100,000
- Surface: Clay
- Location: Bonita Springs, Florida, United States

Champions

Singles
- (United States) Lauren Davis

Doubles
- (Chile) Alexa Guarachi / (New Zealand) Erin Routliffe
FineMark Women's Pro Tennis Championship	· 2021 →

The 2019 FineMark Women's Pro Tennis Championship was a professional tennis tournament played on outdoor clay courts. It was the first edition of the tournament which was part of the 2019 ITF Women's World Tennis Tour. It took place in Bonita Springs, Florida, United States between 6 and 12 May 2019.

== Singles main-draw entrants ==
=== Seeds ===
Country	Player	Rank^{1}	Seed
USA	Madison Brengle	87	1
USA	Taylor Townsend	108	2
USA	Nicole Gibbs	114	3
USA	Lauren Davis	136	4
USA	Sachia Vickery	138	5
USA	Whitney Osuigwe	139	6
USA	Allie Kiick	142	7
UKR	Anhelina Kalinina	150	8

- ^{1} Rankings are as of 29 April 2019.

=== Other entrants ===
The following players received wildcards into the singles main draw:

- (United States) Usue Maitane Arconada
- (United States) Sara Kelly
- (United States) Ann Li
- (United States) Shelby Rogers

The following players received entry from the qualifying draw:

- (United States) Louisa Chirico
- (Canada) Leylah Annie Fernandez
- (Belarus) Olga Govortsova
- (United States) Maegan Manasse
- (Romania) Gabriela Talabă
- (Mexico) Renata Zarazúa

== Champions ==
=== Singles ===
- (United States) Lauren Davis def. (United States) Ann Li, 7–5, 7–5

=== Doubles ===
- (Chile) Alexa Guarachi / (New Zealand) Erin Routliffe def. (United States) Usue Maitane Arconada / (United States) Caroline Dolehide, 6–3, 7–6^{(7–5)}
