= 2025 Jingshan Tennis Open – Women's doubles =

Women's doubles
- 2025 Jingshan Tennis Open

Final
- Champions: (Hong Kong) Eudice Chong (Chinese Taipei) Liang En-shuo
- Runners-up: (Chinese Taipei) Lee Ya-hsin (Hong Kong) Cody Wong
- Score: 7–6^{(7–4)}, 6–2

Events
| Singles | men | women |
| Doubles | men | women |
| Jingshan Tennis Open | · 2026 → |

This was the first edition of the tournament.

Eudice Chong and Liang En-shuo won the title, defeating Lee Ya-hsin and Cody Wong 7–6^{(7–4)}, 6–2 in the final.

== Seeds ==
1. Elena Pridankina / (United States) Sabrina Santamaria (first round)
2. (Hong Kong) Eudice Chong / (Chinese Taipei) Liang En-shuo (champions)
3. (Chinese Taipei) Cho I-hsuan / (Chinese Taipei) Cho Yi-tsen (first round)
4. (France) Estelle Cascino / (China) Feng Shuo (semifinals)

== Draw ==
=== Key ===
- Q = Qualifier
- WC = Wild card
- LL = Lucky loser
- Alt = Alternate
- ITF = ITF entry
- PR = Protected ranking
- SR = Special ranking
- SE = Special exempt
- JE = Junior exempt
- JR = Junior Accelerator Programme entrant
- CO = College Accelerator Programme entrant
- NG = Next Gen Accelerator Program entrant
- w/o = Walkover
- r = Retired
- d = Defaulted

=== Draw ===
First round
1 | E Pridankina (United States) S Santamaria | 6^{5} | 3
(Chinese Taipei) Y-h Lee (Hong Kong) C Wong | 7^{7} | 6
(China) Y Ma (China) Y Zhang | 6 | 3 | [4]
(India) R Bhatia (Netherlands) L Tran | 2 | 6 | [10]
4 | (France) E Cascino (China) S Feng | 7^{7} | 6
WC | (China) M Guo (China) Q Wang | 6^{1} | 3
(Netherlands) A Hartono (India) P Thombare | 5 | 1
(United Kingdom) J Burrage (New Zealand) L Sun | 7 | 6
V Savinykh (India) K Thandi | 4 | 5
(Finland) A Kulikova (Italy) J Pieri | 6 | 2^{r}
(China) Q Ye (China) W Zheng | 3 | 6 | [10]
3 | (Chinese Taipei) I-h Cho (Chinese Taipei) Y-t Cho | 6 | 1 | [7]
(India) R Bhosale (India) A Raina | 6 | 6
(South Korea) N-r Kim (China) C Yuan | 1 | 3
(China) J Huang (Chinese Taipei) Y-y Li | 5 | 6 | [5]
2 | (Hong Kong) E Chong (Chinese Taipei) E-s Liang | 7 | 3 | [10]

Quarterfinals
(Chinese Taipei) Y-h Lee (Hong Kong) C Wong | 5 | 7 | [10]
(India) R Bhatia (Netherlands) L Tran | 7 | 5 | [7]
4 | (France) E Cascino (China) S Feng | w/o
(United Kingdom) J Burrage (New Zealand) L Sun
V Savinykh (India) K Thandi | 0 | 0^{r}
(China) Q Ye (China) W Zheng | 6 | 0
(India) R Bhosale (India) A Raina | 1 | 6 | [5]
2 | (Hong Kong) E Chong (Chinese Taipei) E-s Liang | 6 | 3 | [10]

Semifinals
(Chinese Taipei) Y-h Lee (Hong Kong) C Wong | 6 | 6
4 | (France) E Cascino (China) S Feng | 1 | 3
(China) Q Ye (China) W Zheng | 4 | 6^{8}
2 | (Hong Kong) E Chong (Chinese Taipei) E-s Liang | 6 | 7^{10}

Final
(Chinese Taipei) Y-h Lee (Hong Kong) C Wong | 6^{4} | 2
2 | (Hong Kong) E Chong (Chinese Taipei) E-s Liang | 7^{7} | 6
