= 2024 Hong Kong Tennis Open – Singles =

Singles
- 2024 Hong Kong Tennis Open

Final
- Champion: Diana Shnaider
- Runner-up: (United Kingdom) Katie Boulter
- Score: 6–1, 6–2

Details
- Draw: 32
- Seeds: 8

Events
Singles	Doubles
- Hong Kong Tennis Open

Diana Shnaider defeated Katie Boulter in the final, 6–1, 6–2 to win the singles tennis title at the 2024 Hong Kong Tennis Open. It was her fourth WTA Tour title.

Leylah Fernandez was the defending champion, but lost to Shnaider in the semifinals.

== Seeds ==
1. Diana Shnaider (champion)
2. (United Kingdom) Katie Boulter (final)
3. (Canada) Leylah Fernandez (semifinals)
4. (China) Wang Xinyu (first round)
5. (New Zealand) Lulu Sun (withdrew)
6. (China) Yuan Yue (semifinals)
7. (France) Varvara Gracheva (second round)
8. (Spain) Cristina Bucșa (second round)
9. (United States) Bernarda Pera (quarterfinals)

== Draw ==
Key

- Q = Qualifier
- WC = Wild card
- LL = Lucky loser
- Alt = Alternate
- ITF = ITF entry
- PR = Protected ranking
- SR = Special ranking
- SE = Special exempt
- JE = Junior exempt
- JR = Junior Accelerator Programme entrant
- CO = College Accelerator Programme entrant
- NG = Next Gen Accelerator Program entrant
- w/o = Walkover
- r = Retired
- d = Defaulted

=== Finals ===
Semifinals
1	Diana Shnaider	6	6
3	(Canada) Leylah Fernandez	4	2
6	(China) Yuan Yue	2	7	2
2	(United Kingdom) Katie Boulter	6	5	6

Final
1	Diana Shnaider	6	6
2	(United Kingdom) Katie Boulter	1	2

=== Top half ===
First round
1	D Shnaider	6	6
Q	(Japan) K Okamura	3	3
(Australia) P Hon	6	6
WC	(Hong Kong) E Chong	3	4
Q	(China) X Gao	3	0
(Netherlands) S Lamens	6	6
WC	(Hong Kong) C Wong	3	3
8	(Spain) C Bucșa	6	6
3	(Canada) L Fernandez	6	6
(United Kingdom) H Watson	2	2
(Romania) A Bogdan	3	4
(Australia) K Birrell	6	6
PR	M Betova	4	2
Q	(China) H Shi	6	6
(Japan) S Saito	4	4
9	(United States) B Pera	6	6

Second round
1	D Shnaider	6	6
(Australia) P Hon	4	1
(Netherlands) S Lamens	5	6	6
8	(Spain) C Bucșa	7	4	3
3	(Canada) L Fernandez	6	6
(Australia) K Birrell	1	2
Q	(China) H Shi	0	4
9	(United States) B Pera	6	6

Quarterfinals
1	D Shnaider	6	6^{4}	6
(Netherlands) S Lamens	0	7^{7}	2
3	(Canada) L Fernandez	6	7^{9}
9	(United States) B Pera	1	6^{7}

Semifinals
1	D Shnaider	6	6
3	(Canada) L Fernandez	4	2

=== Bottom half ===
First round
6	(China) Y Yuan	6	6
WC	(Romania) S Halep	3	3
(Japan) N Hibino	6^{4}	6	7
LL	(China) Jia Lu	7^{7}	3	5
Q	(Japan) M Yamaguchi	4	4
WC	(United States) S Kenin	6	6
(France) J Ponchet	4	7	6
4	(China) Xin Wang	6	5	2
7	(France) V Gracheva	2	7	6
Q	T Prozorova	6	5	2
LL	(South Korea) S-j Jang	5	4
A Zakharova	7	6
(China) Xiy Wang	6	7^{7}
Q	(United States) H Inoue	3	6^{2}
(Japan) A Ito	4	4
2	(United Kingdom) K Boulter	6	6

Second round
6	(China) Y Yuan	4	7	6
(Japan) N Hibino	6	5	2
WC	(United States) S Kenin	7	6
(France) J Ponchet	5	4
7	(France) V Gracheva	3	1
A Zakharova	6	6
(China) Xiy Wang	6^{7}	4
2	(United Kingdom) K Boulter	7^{9}	6

Quarterfinals
6	(China) Y Yuan	6	6
WC	(United States) S Kenin	3	3
A Zakharova	4	0
2	(United Kingdom) K Boulter	6	6

Semifinals
6	(China) Y Yuan	2	7	2
2	(United Kingdom) K Boulter	6	5	6

== Qualifying ==
=== Seeds ===
1. (China) Gao Xinyu (qualified)
2. (China) Ma Yexin (first round)
3. (South Korea) Jang Su-jeong (qualifying competition, lucky loser)
4. (United States) Hina Inoue (qualified)
5. (China) Lu Jiajing (qualifying competition, lucky loser)
6. (China) Shi Han (qualified)
7. (Chinese Taipei) Liang En-shuo (qualifying competition)
8. Tatiana Prozorova (qualified)
9. (Canada) Carol Zhao (qualifying competition)
10. (Japan) Kyōka Okamura (qualified)
11. (Japan) Mei Yamaguchi (qualified)
12. (Thailand) Thasaporn Naklo (qualifying competition)

=== Qualifiers ===
1. (China) Gao Xinyu
2. Tatiana Prozorova
3. (Japan) Kyōka Okamura
4. (United States) Hina Inoue
5. (Japan) Mei Yamaguchi
6. (China) Shi Han

=== Lucky losers ===
1. (South Korea) Jang Su-jeong
2. (China) Lu Jiajing

=== Qualifying draw ===
==== First qualifier ====
First round
1	(China) Gao Xinyu	3	6	6
(Chinese Taipei) Tsao Chia-yi	6	1	1
WC	(Hong Kong) Ng Man-ying	5	1
9	(Canada) Carol Zhao	7	6

Qualifying competition
1	(China) Gao Xinyu	7^{7}	7^{7}
9	(Canada) Carol Zhao	6^{4}	6^{3}

==== Second qualifier ====
First round
2	(China) Ma Yexin	3	2
(Japan) Makoto Ninomiya	6	6
WC	(Hong Kong) Justine Leong	3	1
8	Tatiana Prozorova	6	6

Qualifying competition
(Japan) Makoto Ninomiya	3	3
8	Tatiana Prozorova	6	6

==== Third qualifier ====
First round
3	(South Korea) Jang Su-jeong	6	6
WC	(Hong Kong) Che Sin-yu	1	1
WC	(Chinese Taipei) Cho I-hsuan	4	2
10	(Japan) Kyōka Okamura	6	6

Qualifying competition
3	(South Korea) Jang Su-jeong	5	0
10	(Japan) Kyōka Okamura	7	6

==== Fourth qualifier ====
First round
4	(United States) Hina Inoue	6	5
(Hong Kong) Wu Ho-ching	0	2^{r}
WC	(Hong Kong) Leung Yui-hei Hebe	1	1
12	(Thailand) Thasaporn Naklo	6	6

Qualifying competition
4	(United States) Hina Inoue	6	3	6
12	(Thailand) Thasaporn Naklo	1	6	3

==== Fifth qualifier ====
First round
5	(China) Lu Jiajing	6	6
(Ukraine) Nadiia Kolb	3	3
(China) Guo Meiqi	5	4
11	(Japan) Mei Yamaguchi	7	6

Qualifying competition
5	(China) Lu Jiajing	1	6^{7}
11	(Japan) Mei Yamaguchi	6	7^{9}

==== Sixth qualifier ====
First round
6	(China) Shi Han	6	6
(Norway) Ulrikke Eikeri	2	0
WC	(Chinese Taipei) Cho Yi-tsen	4	2
7	(Chinese Taipei) Liang En-shuo	6	6

Qualifying competition
6	(China) Shi Han	6	6
7	(Chinese Taipei) Liang En-shuo	4	4
