= 2023 FineMark Women's Pro Tennis Championship =

Tennis tournament

- Date: 1–7 May 2023
- Edition: 4th
- Category: ITF Women's World Tennis Tour
- Prize money: $100,000
- Surface: Clay / Outdoor
- Location: Bonita Springs, United States

Champions

Singles
- (United States) Kayla Day

Doubles
- (United States) Makenna Jones / (United States) Jamie Loeb
← 2022 ·	FineMark Women's Pro Tennis Championship	· 2024 →

The 2023 FineMark Women's Pro Tennis Championship was a professional tennis tournament played on outdoor clay courts. It was the fourth edition of the tournament, which was part of the 2023 ITF Women's World Tennis Tour. It took place in Bonita Springs, United States, between 1 and 7 May 2023.

== Champions ==
=== Singles ===
- (United States) Kayla Day def. (United States) Ann Li, 6–2, 6–2

=== Doubles ===
- (United States) Makenna Jones / (United States) Jamie Loeb def. (United States) Ashlyn Krueger / (United States) Robin Montgomery, 5–7, 6–4, [10–2]

== Singles main draw entrants ==
=== Seeds ===
Country	Player	Rank	Seed
JPN	Nao Hibino	111	1
CHN	Yuan Yue	116	2
USA	Caroline Dolehide	123	3
USA	Ashlyn Krueger	155	4
USA	Sachia Vickery	172	5
USA	Robin Montgomery	181	6
USA	Kayla Day	183	7
GBR	Yuriko Miyazaki	195	8

- Rankings are as of 24 April 2023.

=== Other entrants ===
The following players received wildcards into the singles main draw:

- (France) Emma Bardet
- (United States) Hina Inoue
- (United States) Makenna Jones
- (United States) Grace Min

The following players received entry from the qualifying draw:

- (Canada) Cadence Brace
- (United States) Victoria Hu
- (United States) Raveena Kingsley
- (United States) Maria Mateas
- (United States) Kaitlin Quevedo
- (Ukraine) Yulia Starodubtseva
- (Latvia) Daniela Vismane
- (Bolivia) Noelia Zeballos
