= 2025 Jingshan Tennis Open =

Tennis tournament in China

- Date: 22–28 September 2025
- Edition: 1st
- Category: WTA 125; ATP Challenger 100
- Prize money: $160,000
- Surface: Hard
- Location: Jingshan, China

Champions

Men's singles
- (United States) Eliot Spizzirri

Women's singles
- (New Zealand) Lulu Sun

Men's doubles
- (India) Anirudh Chandrasekar / (United States) Reese Stalder

Women's doubles
- (Hong Kong) Eudice Chong / (Chinese Taipei) Liang En-shuo
- Jingshan Tennis Open

The 2025 HuBei Bank Jingshan Tennis Open was a professional tennis tournament played on outdoor hard courts. It was the first edition of the tournament and part of the 2025 WTA 125 tournaments and the 2025 ATP Challenger Tour. It took place in Jingshan, China between 22 and 28 September 2025.

== Men's singles main-draw entrants ==
=== Seeds ===
Country	Player	Rank^{1}	Seed
~~FRA~~	~~Valentin Royer~~	~~88~~	~~1~~
USA	Mackenzie McDonald	98	2
CZE	Dalibor Svrčina	99	3
AUS	James Duckworth	107	4
GEO	Nikoloz Basilashvili	114	5
USA	Brandon Holt	116	6
USA	Tristan Boyer	117	7
CAN	Liam Draxl	119	8

- ^{1} Rankings are as of 15 September 2025.

=== Other entrants ===
The following players received wildcards into the singles main draw:

- (China) Cui Jie
- (China) Te Rigele
- (China) Zhang Tianhui

The following players received entry into the singles main draw as alternates:

- (Croatia) Borna Gojo
- (Australia) Omar Jasika
- (Belgium) Gauthier Onclin

The following players received entry from the qualifying draw:

- Petr Bar Biryukov
- (Australia) Alex Bolt
- (South Africa) Lloyd Harris
- Marat Sharipov
- (South Korea) Shin San-hui
- (Chinese Taipei) Wu Tung-lin

The following players received entry as lucky losers:

- (Colombia) Adrià Soriano Barrera
- (Kazakhstan) Denis Yevseyev

== Women's singles main-draw entrants ==
=== Seeds ===
Country	Player	Rank^{1}	Seed
PHI	Alexandra Eala	57	1
AUS	Talia Gibson	123	2
NZL	Lulu Sun	147	3
GBR	Jodie Burrage	149	4
CHN	Gao Xinyu	165	5
JPN	Mai Hontama	187	6
NED	Arianne Hartono	191	7
JPN	Kyōka Okamura	198	8

- ^{1} Rankings are as of 25 August 2025.

=== Other entrants ===
The following players received wildcards into the singles main draw:

- (China) Wang Meiling
- (China) Wang Yuhan
- (China) Wu Ruxi
- (China) Yang Yidi

The following player received entry using a protected ranking:

- (India) Karman Thandi

The following players received entry from the qualifying draw:

- (India) Riya Bhatia
- (United States) Lea Ma
- Ekaterina Reyngold
- (China) Tian Fangran

== Women's doubles entrants ==
=== Seeds ===
Country	Player	Country	Player	Rank	Seed
	Elena Pridankina	USA	Sabrina Santamaria	149	1
HKG	Eudice Chong	TPE	Liang En-shuo	231	2
TPE	Cho I-hsuan	TPE	Cho Yi-tsen	232	3
FRA	Estelle Cascino	CHN	Feng Shuo	259	4

- Rankings as of 15 September 2025.

=== Other entrants ===
The following pair received a wildcard into the doubles main draw:

- (China) Guo Meiqi / (China) Wang Qiang

== Champions ==
=== Men's singles ===
- (United States) Eliot Spizzirri def. (Australia) Alex Bolt 6–4, 6–4.

=== Women's singles ===
- (New Zealand) Lulu Sun def. (China) Ma Yexin 6–4, 6–2

=== Men's doubles ===
- (India) Anirudh Chandrasekar / (United States) Reese Stalder def. (Chinese Taipei) Huang Tsung-hao / (South Korea) Park Ui-sung 6–2, 2–6, [10–7].

=== Women's doubles ===
- (Hong Kong) Eudice Chong / (Chinese Taipei) Liang En-shuo def. (Chinese Taipei) Lee Ya-hsin / (Hong Kong) Cody Wong 7–6^{(7–4)}, 6–2
