= 2022 FineMark Women's Pro Tennis Championship =

Tennis tournament

- Date: 2–8 May 2022
- Edition: 3rd
- Category: ITF Women's World Tennis Tour
- Prize money: $100,000
- Surface: Clay / Outdoor
- Location: Bonita Springs, Florida, United States

Champions

Singles
- (Romania) Gabriela Lee

Doubles
- (Hungary) Tímea Babos / (Japan) Nao Hibino
← 2021 ·	FineMark Women's Pro Tennis Championship	· 2023 →

The 2022 FineMark Women's Pro Tennis Championship was a professional tennis tournament played on outdoor clay courts. It was the third edition of the tournament which was part of the 2022 ITF Women's World Tennis Tour. It took place in Bonita Springs, Florida, United States between 2 and 8 May 2022.

== Singles main draw entrants ==
=== Seeds ===
Country	Player	Rank^{1}	Seed
ROU	Irina Bara	105	1
GER	Tatjana Maria	112	2
USA	Katie Volynets	121	3
CHN	Wang Xiyu	123	4
USA	CoCo Vandeweghe	129	5
SWE	Mirjam Björklund	153	6
POL	Katarzyna Kawa	158	7
ROU	Alexandra Cadanțu-Ignatik	161	8

- ^{1} Rankings are as of 25 April 2022.

=== Other entrants ===
The following players received wildcards into the singles main draw:

- (United States) Ellie Douglas
- (Sweden) Fanny Norin
- (United States) Whitney Osuigwe
- (United States) Sachia Vickery

The following players received entry from the qualifying draw:

- (Hungary) Tímea Babos
- (Brazil) Gabriela Cé
- (United States) Sophie Chang
- (United States) Kayla Day
- (Romania) Gabriela Lee
- (United States) Sonya Macavei
- (United Kingdom) Tara Moore
- (United States) Chanelle Van Nguyen

== Champions ==
=== Singles ===
- (Romania) Gabriela Lee def. (Poland) Katarzyna Kawa, 6–1, 6–3

=== Doubles ===
- (Hungary) Tímea Babos / (Japan) Nao Hibino def. Olga Govortsova / (Poland) Katarzyna Kawa, 6–4, 3–6, [10–7]
