= 2023 FineMark Women's Pro Tennis Championship – Singles =

Singles
- 2023 FineMark Women's Pro Tennis Championship

Final
- Champion: (United States) Kayla Day
- Runner-up: (United States) Ann Li
- Score: 6–2, 6–2

Events
Singles	Doubles
← 2022 ·	FineMark Women's Pro Tennis Championship	· 2024 →

Gabriela Lee was the defending champion but lost in the first round to Marcela Zacarías.

Kayla Day won the title, defeating Ann Li in the final, 6–2, 6–2.

== Seeds ==
1. (Japan) Nao Hibino (second round)
2. (China) Yuan Yue (first round)
3. (United States) Caroline Dolehide (semifinals)
4. (United States) Ashlyn Krueger (first round)
5. (United States) Sachia Vickery (quarterfinals)
6. (United States) Robin Montgomery (first round)
7. (United States) Kayla Day (champion)
8. (United Kingdom) Yuriko Miyazaki (first round)

== Draw ==
=== Key ===
- Q = Qualifier
- WC = Wild card
- LL = Lucky loser
- Alt = Alternate
- SE = Special exempt
- PR = Protected ranking
- ITF = ITF entry
- JE = Junior exempt
- w/o = Walkover
- r = Retired
- d = Defaulted
- SR = Special ranking

=== Finals ===
Semifinals
(Australia) Astra Sharma	2	3
(United States) Ann Li	6	6
3	(United States) Caroline Dolehide	6^{5}	6	0
7	(United States) Kayla Day	7^{7}	1	6

Final
(United States) Ann Li	2	2
7	(United States) Kayla Day	6	6

=== Top half ===
First round
1	(Japan) N Hibino	6	6
WC	(United States) H Inoue	4	1
(Mexico) R Zarazúa	6	7^{8}
WC	(United States) M Jones	1	6^{6}
(United States) S Chang	6	6
(United States) W Osuigwe	2	0
(Australia) A Sharma	1	7	7^{7}
6	(United States) R Montgomery	6	5	6^{3}
4	(United States) A Krueger	3	5
(United States) A Li	6	7
Q	(Canada) C Brace	2	1
(United States) J Loeb	6	6
Q	(United States) R Kingsley	6	6
(United States) R Anderson	4	4
Q	(Latvia) D Vismane	3	3
6	(United States) S Vickery	6	6

Second round
1	(Japan) N Hibino	3	5
(Mexico) R Zarazúa	6	7
(United States) S Chang	4	3
(Australia) A Sharma	6	6
(United States) A Li	6	7
(United States) J Loeb	4	5
Q	(United States) R Kingsley	0	4
6	(United States) S Vickery	6	6

Quarterfinals
(Mexico) R Zarazúa	6	3	4
(Australia) A Sharma	1	6	6
(United States) A Li	7	2	6
6	(United States) S Vickery	5	6	1

Semifinals
(Australia) A Sharma	2	3
(United States) A Li	6	6

=== Bottom half ===
First round
8	(United Kingdom) Y Miyazaki	4	4
Q	(United States) V Hu	6	6
WC	(United States) G Min	3	6	2
Q	(United States) K Quevedo	6	4	6
Q	(Bolivia) N Zeballos	3	3
(United States) L Chirico	6	6
Q	(Ukraine) Y Starodubtseva	4	4
3	(United States) C Dolehide	6	6
7	(United States) K Day	6	6
WC	(France) E Bardet	2	1
Q	(United States) M Mateas	1	4
(Poland) K Kawa	6	6
(Romania) G Lee	4	4
(Mexico) M Zacarías	6	6
(United States) H Baptiste	6	6
2	(China) Y Yuan	4	4

Second round
Q	(United States) V Hu	5	6	4
Q	(United States) K Quevedo	7	4	6
(United States) L Chirico	4	4
3	(United States) C Dolehide	6	6
7	(United States) K Day	6	6
(Poland) K Kawa	2	2
(Mexico) M Zacarías	7	0
(United States) H Baptiste	5	0^{r}

Quarterfinals
Q	(United States) K Quevedo	0	0
3	(United States) C Dolehide	6	6
7	(United States) K Day	7	6
(Mexico) M Zacarías	5	3

Semifinals
3	(United States) C Dolehide	6^{5}	6	0
7	(United States) K Day	7^{7}	1	6
