= 2025 Jingshan Tennis Open – Women's singles =

Women's singles
- 2025 Jingshan Tennis Open

Final
- Champion: (New Zealand) Lulu Sun
- Runner-up: (China) Ma Yexin
- Score: 6–4, 6–2

Events
Singles	men	women
Doubles	men	women
Jingshan Tennis Open	· 2026 →

This was the first edition of the tournament.

Lulu Sun won the title, defeating Ma Yexin 6–4, 6–2 in the final.

== Seeds ==
1. (Philippines) Alexandra Eala (semifinals)
2. (Australia) Talia Gibson (semifinals)
3. (New Zealand) Lulu Sun (champion)
4. (United Kingdom) Jodie Burrage (first round)
5. (China) Gao Xinyu (first round)
6. (Japan) Mai Hontama (first round)
7. (Netherlands) Arianne Hartono (first round)
8. (Japan) Kyōka Okamura (second round)

== Draw ==
=== Key ===
- Q = Qualifier
- WC = Wild card
- LL = Lucky loser
- Alt = Alternate
- ITF = ITF entry
- PR = Protected ranking
- SR = Special ranking
- SE = Special exempt
- JE = Junior exempt
- JR = Junior Accelerator Programme entrant
- CO = College Accelerator Programme entrant
- NG = Next Gen Accelerator Program entrant
- w/o = Walkover
- r = Retired
- d = Defaulted

=== Finals ===
Semifinals
1	(Philippines) Alexandra Eala	6	4	2
3	(New Zealand) Lulu Sun	3	6	6
(China) Ma Yexin	4	7	7
2	(Australia) Talia Gibson	6	5	5

Final
3	(New Zealand) Lulu Sun	6	6
(China) Ma Yexin	4	2

=== Top half ===
First round
1	(Philippines) A Eala	6	7
A Falei	3	5
(Japan) M Yamaguchi	6	6
(Hong Kong) C Wong	4	1
Q	E Reyngold	7^{7}	4	4
(China) Jia Lu	6^{5}	6	6
Q	(India) R Bhatia	6	1	6
5	(China) X Gao	4	6	3
3	(New Zealand) L Sun	6	6
(Italy) TC Grant	3	2
WC	(China) R Wu	7^{7}	5	6
WC	(China) Yu Wang	6^{1}	7	3
(China) X You	4
(Italy) J Pieri	1^{r}
E Pridankina	6	6^{10}	7
6	(Japan) M Hontama	3	7^{12}	5

Second round
1	(Philippines) A Eala	6	6
(Japan) M Yamaguchi	0	3
(China) Jia Lu	6	6
Q	(India) R Bhatia	4	0
3	(New Zealand) L Sun	6	6
WC	(China) R Wu	3	0
(China) X You	2	1
E Pridankina	6	6

Quarterfinals
1	(Philippines) A Eala	6	6
(China) Jia Lu	4	1
3	(New Zealand) L Sun	6	6
E Pridankina	2	4

Semifinals
1	(Philippines) A Eala	6	4	2
3	(New Zealand) L Sun	3	6	6

=== Bottom half ===
First round
7	(Netherlands) A Hartono	7^{7}	3	4
Q	(United States) L Ma	6^{3}	6	6
(Japan) R Saigo	6	6
Q	(China) F Tian	1	0
(United States) H Inoue	6	4	6
WC	(China) Y Yang	4	6	2
(China) Y Ma	6	6
4	(United Kingdom) J Burrage	4	3
8	(Japan) K Okamura	6	6
(China) W Zheng	3	3
(France) C Monnet	6	2	1
(Chinese Taipei) E-s Liang	4	6	6
PR	(India) K Thandi	3	6^{0}
(Finland) A Kulikova	6	7^{7}
WC	(China) M Wang	4	4
2	(Australia) T Gibson	6	6

Second round
Q	(United States) L Ma	6	2	2
(Japan) R Saigo	4	6	6
(United States) H Inoue	2	2
(China) Y Ma	6	6
8	(Japan) K Okamura	5	1
(Chinese Taipei) E-s Liang	7	6
(Finland) A Kulikova	4	6	3
2	(Australia) T Gibson	6	1	6

Quarterfinals
(Japan) R Saigo	5	2
(China) Y Ma	7	6
(Chinese Taipei) E-s Liang	6	4	0
2	(Australia) T Gibson	3	6	6

Semifinals
(China) Y Ma	4	7	7
2	(Australia) T Gibson	6	5	5

== Qualifying ==
=== Seeds ===
1. Ekaterina Reyngold (qualified)
2. (United States) Lea Ma (qualified)
3. (Netherlands) Lian Tran (first round)
4. (Italy) Diletta Cherubini (first round)
5. (Ukraine) Katarina Zavatska (first round)
6. (India) Ankita Raina (withdrew)
7. (China) Zhang Ying (qualifying competition)
8. (Hong Kong) Cody Wong (moved to main draw)

=== Qualifiers ===
1. Ekaterina Reyngold
2. (United States) Lea Ma
3. (China) Tian Fangran
4. (India) Riya Bhatia

=== Qualifying draw ===
==== First qualifier ====
First round				Qualifying competition
1	Ekaterina Reyngold	6	6
	Valeria Savinykh	1	2
	Valeria Savinykh	1	2	1	Ekaterina Reyngold	6	3	6
				WC	(China) Ye Qiuyu	2	6	1

==== Second qualifier ====
First round
2	(United States) Lea Ma	6	6
(China) Fang Yingxun	3	2
(China) Wang Jiaqi	6	3	6^{4}
7	(China) Zhang Ying	4	6	7^{7}

Qualifying competition
2	(United States) Lea Ma	6	5	6
7	(China) Zhang Ying	2	7	2

==== Third qualifier ====
First round
3	(Netherlands) Lian Tran	0	2
(China) Tian Fangran	6	6
(China) Guo Meiqi	6	2	6
5	(Ukraine) Katarina Zavatska	0	6	3

Qualifying competition
(China) Tian Fangran	0	7^{9}	3
(China) Guo Meiqi	6	6^{7}	3^{r}

==== Fourth qualifier ====
First round					Qualifying competition
4	(Italy) Diletta Cherubini	6	1	1
	(China) Lu Jingjing	3	6	6
	(China) Lu Jingjing	3	6	6	(China) Lu Jingjing	3	6	4
					(India) Riya Bhatia	6	3	6
