= 2024 Hong Kong Tennis Open – Doubles =

Doubles
- 2024 Hong Kong Tennis Open

Final
- Champions: (Norway) Ulrikke Eikeri (Japan) Makoto Ninomiya
- Runners-up: (Japan) Shuko Aoyama (Japan) Eri Hozumi
- Score: 6–4, 4–6, [11–9]

Details
- Draw: 16
- Seeds: 4

Events
Singles	Doubles
- Hong Kong Tennis Open

Ulrikke Eikeri and Makoto Ninomiya defeated Shuko Aoyama and Eri Hozumi in the final, 6–4, 4–6, [11–9] to win the doubles tennis title at the 2024 Hong Kong Tennis Open. They saved two championship points in the final.

Tang Qianhui and Tsao Chia-yi were the reigning champions, but Tang participated in Jiangxi instead. Tsao partnered Liang En-shuo, but they lost in the first round to Eikeri and Ninomiya.

== Seeds ==
1. (Spain) Cristina Bucșa / (Japan) Miyu Kato (semifinals)
2. (Slovakia) Tereza Mihalíková / (United Kingdom) Olivia Nicholls (semifinals)
3. (Norway) Ulrikke Eikeri / (Japan) Makoto Ninomiya (champions)
4. (Japan) Shuko Aoyama / (Japan) Eri Hozumi (final)

== Draw ==
Key

- Q = Qualifier
- WC = Wild card
- LL = Lucky loser
- Alt = Alternate
- ITF = ITF entry
- PR = Protected ranking
- SR = Special ranking
- SE = Special exempt
- JE = Junior exempt
- JR = Junior Accelerator Programme entrant
- CO = College Accelerator Programme entrant
- NG = Next Gen Accelerator Program entrant
- w/o = Walkover
- r = Retired
- d = Defaulted

=== Draw ===
First round
1	(Spain) C Bucșa (Japan) M Kato	5	6	[10]
(Chinese Taipei) I-h Cho (Chinese Taipei) Y-t Cho	7	4	[6]
(Czech Republic) A Dețiuc (United States) S Santamaria	6	6
(China) Y Ma (Canada) C Zhao	2	1
4	(Japan) S Aoyama (Japan) E Hozumi	3	6	[10]
(China) Xiy Wang (China) Y Xu	6	3	[8]
WC	(Hong Kong) E Chong (Hong Kong) C Wong	6	3	[9]
(Japan) N Hibino (France) J Ponchet	4	6	[11]
(Japan) A Ito (Japan) K Okamura	2	6	[6]
(Ukraine) M Kolb (Ukraine) N Kolb	6	2	[10]
(Chinese Taipei) E-s Liang (Chinese Taipei) C-y Tsao	6^{5}	6	[3]
3	(Norway) U Eikeri (Japan) M Ninomiya	7^{7}	2	[10]
WC	(Hong Kong) J Leong (Hong Kong) M Ng	4	4
PR	M Betova; T Prozorova	6	6
(China) H Guo (South Korea) S-j Jang	1	0
2	(Slovakia) T Mihalíková (United Kingdom) O Nicholls	6	6

Quarterfinals
1	(Spain) C Bucșa (Japan) M Kato	6	6
(Czech Republic) A Dețiuc (United States) S Santamaria	3	1
4	(Japan) S Aoyama (Japan) E Hozumi	2	7	[10]
(Japan) N Hibino (France) J Ponchet	6	5	[6]
(Ukraine) M Kolb (Ukraine) N Kolb	6^{4}	2
3	(Norway) U Eikeri (Japan) M Ninomiya	7^{7}	6
PR	M Betova; T Prozorova	1	1
2	(Slovakia) T Mihalíková (United Kingdom) O Nicholls	6	6

Semifinals
1	(Spain) C Bucșa (Japan) M Kato	7^{7}	4	[12]
4	(Japan) S Aoyama (Japan) E Hozumi	6^{2}	6	[14]
3	(Norway) U Eikeri (Japan) M Ninomiya	6^{8}	7	[10]
2	(Slovakia) T Mihalíková (United Kingdom) O Nicholls	7^{10}	5	[7]

Final
4	(Japan) S Aoyama (Japan) E Hozumi	4	6	[9]
3	(Norway) U Eikeri (Japan) M Ninomiya	6	4	[11]
