= 2024 Hong Kong Tennis Open =

- Date: 28 October–3 November
- Edition: 11th
- Category: WTA 250
- Draw: 32S / 16D
- Surface: Hard
- Location: Hong Kong
- Venue: Victoria Park Tennis Stadium

Champions

Singles
- Diana Shnaider

Doubles
- (Norway) Ulrikke Eikeri / (Japan) Makoto Ninomiya
- Hong Kong Tennis Open

The 2024 Hong Kong Tennis Open (also known as the Prudential Hong Kong Tennis Open for sponsorship reasons) was a professional women's tennis tournament played on outdoor hard courts. It was the 11th edition of the tournament, and part of the WTA 250 tournaments on the 2024 WTA Tour. It took place in Victoria Park, Hong Kong from 28 October to 3 November 2024. First-seeded Diana Shnaider won the singles title.

== Champions ==
=== Singles ===
- Diana Shnaider def. (United Kingdom) Katie Boulter 6–1, 6–2

=== Doubles ===
- (Norway) Ulrikke Eikeri / (Japan) Makoto Ninomiya def. (Japan) Shuko Aoyama / (Japan) Eri Hozumi 6–4, 4–6, [11–9]

== Singles main-draw entrants ==
=== Seeds ===
Country	Player	Rank^{1}	Seed
	Diana Shnaider	16	1
GBR	Katie Boulter	33	2
CAN	Leylah Fernandez	35	3
CHN	Wang Xinyu	39	4
~~NZL~~	~~Lulu Sun~~	~~41~~	~~5~~
CHN	Yuan Yue	44	6
FRA	Varvara Gracheva	68	7
ESP	Cristina Bucșa	70	8
USA	Bernarda Pera	79	9

- ^{1} Rankings are as of 21 October 2024.

=== Other entrants ===
The following players received wildcards into the singles main draw:

- (Hong Kong) Eudice Chong
- (Romania) Simona Halep
- (United States) Sofia Kenin
- (Hong Kong) Cody Wong

The following player received entry using a protected ranking:

- Margarita Betova

The following players received entry from the qualifying draw:

- (China) Gao Xinyu
- (United States) Hina Inoue
- (Japan) Kyōka Okamura
- Tatiana Prozorova
- (China) Shi Han
- (Japan) Mei Yamaguchi

The following players received entry as lucky losers:

- (South Korea) Jang Su-jeong
- (China) Lu Jiajing

=== Withdrawals ===
- (Armenia) Elina Avanesyan → replaced by (Australia) Kimberly Birrell
- (United States) Danielle Collins → replaced by Margarita Betova
- (Poland) Magdalena Fręch → replaced by (Japan) Nao Hibino
- (Australia) Olivia Gadecki → replaced by (Japan) Sara Saito
- (Japan) Naomi Osaka → replaced by (Australia) Priscilla Hon
- Anastasia Potapova → replaced by Anastasia Zakharova
- (United Kingdom) Emma Raducanu → replaced by Aliaksandra Sasnovich
- (Romania) Elena-Gabriela Ruse → replaced by (Netherlands) Suzan Lamens
- Aliaksandra Sasnovich → replaced by (China) Lu Jiajing
- (Czech Republic) Kateřina Siniaková → replaced by (Romania) Ana Bogdan
- (New Zealand) Lulu Sun → replaced by (South Korea) Jang Su-jeong
- (Denmark) Clara Tauson → replaced by (United Kingdom) Heather Watson
- (United States) Taylor Townsend → replaced by (France) Jessika Ponchet
- (Ukraine) Dayana Yastremska → replaced by (China) Wang Xiyu

== Doubles main-draw entrants ==
=== Seeds ===
Country	Player	Country	Player	Rank^{1}	Seed
ESP	Cristina Bucșa	JPN	Miyu Kato	61	1
SVK	Tereza Mihalíková	GBR	Olivia Nicholls	84	2
NOR	Ulrikke Eikeri	JPN	Makoto Ninomiya	101	3
JPN	Shuko Aoyama	JPN	Eri Hozumi	107	4

- ^{1} Rankings as of 21 October 2024.

=== Other entrants ===
The following pairs received wildcards into the main draw:

- (Hong Kong) Eudice Chong / (Hong Kong) Cody Wong
- (Hong Kong) Justine Leong / (Hong Kong) Maggie Ng
