= 2024 FineMark Women's Pro Tennis Championship =

Tennis tournament

- Date: 29 April–5 May 2024
- Edition: 5th
- Category: ITF Women's World Tennis Tour
- Prize money: $100,000
- Surface: Clay / Outdoor
- Location: Bonita Springs, United States

Champions

Singles
- (New Zealand) Lulu Sun

Doubles
- (Hungary) Fanny Stollár / (New Zealand) Lulu Sun
← 2023 ·	FineMark Women's Pro Tennis Championship	· 2025 →

The 2024 FineMark Women's Pro Tennis Championship was a professional tennis tournament played on outdoor clay courts. It was the fifth edition of the tournament, which was part of the 2024 ITF Women's World Tennis Tour. It took place in Bonita Springs, United States, between 29 April and 5 May 2024.

== Champions ==
=== Singles ===
- (New Zealand) Lulu Sun def. (Australia) Maya Joint, 6–1, 6–3

=== Doubles ===
- (Hungary) Fanny Stollár / (New Zealand) Lulu Sun def. (Greece) Valentini Grammatikopoulou / (Ukraine) Valeriya Strakhova, 6–4, 7–5

== Singles main draw entrants ==
=== Seeds ===
Country	Player	Rank	Seed
USA	Kayla Day	84	1
NZL	Lulu Sun	164	2
USA	Ann Li	165	3
HUN	Tímea Babos	180	4
GRE	Valentini Grammatikopoulou	211	5
USA	Elvina Kalieva	214	6
LTU	Justina Mikulskytė	219	7
USA	Varvara Lepchenko	244	8

- Rankings are as of 22 April 2024.

=== Other entrants ===
The following players received wildcards into the singles main draw:

- (United States) Sophie Chang
- (United States) Maegan Manasse
- (Sweden) Fanny Norin
- (United States) Akasha Urhobo

The following player received entry into the singles main draw using a special ranking:

- (United States) Usue Maitane Arconada

The following players received entry from the qualifying draw:

- (United Kingdom) Emily Appleton
- (United States) Iva Jovic
- (Bulgaria) Lia Karatancheva
- (Slovakia) Martina Okáľová
- (United States) Victoria Osuigwe
- (United States) Whitney Osuigwe
- (United States) Anna Rogers
- (India) Sahaja Yamalapalli
