= 2021 FineMark Women's Pro Tennis Championship =

Tennis tournament

- Date: 10–16 May 2021
- Edition: 2nd
- Category: ITF Women's World Tennis Tour
- Prize money: $100,000
- Surface: Clay
- Location: Bonita Springs, United States

Champions

Singles
- (United States) Katie Volynets

Doubles
- (New Zealand) Erin Routliffe / (Indonesia) Aldila Sutjiadi
| ← 2019 · | FineMark Women's Pro Tennis Championship | · 2022 → |

The 2021 FineMark Women's Pro Tennis Championship was a professional women's tennis tournament played on outdoor clay courts. It was the second edition of the tournament which was part of the 2021 ITF Women's World Tennis Tour. It took place in Bonita Springs, United States between 10 and 16 May 2021.

== Singles main-draw entrants ==
=== Seeds ===
| Country | Player | Rank^{1} | Seed |
|---|---|---|---|
| USA | Madison Brengle | 86 | 1 |
| AUS | Astra Sharma | 119 | 2 |
| EGY | Mayar Sherif | 123 | 3 |
| USA | Kristie Ahn | 124 | 4 |
| ROU | Irina Bara | 133 | 5 |
| MEX | Renata Zarazúa | 141 | 6 |
| BLR | Olga Govortsova | 142 | 7 |
| CHN | Wang Xinyu | 145 | 8 |

- ^{1} Rankings are as of 26 April 2021.

=== Other entrants ===
The following players received wildcards into the singles main draw:

- (United States) Hailey Baptiste
- (United States) Ashlyn Krueger
- (United States) Robin Montgomery
- (United States) Katie Volynets

The following player received entry using a protected ranking:

- (Belarus) Vera Lapko

The following players received entry from the qualifying draw:

- (Sweden) Mirjam Björklund
- (United States) Hanna Chang
- (United States) Victoria Duval
- (Romania) Irina Fetecău
- (Japan) Yuriko Lily Miyazaki
- (Japan) Kyōka Okamura
- (Greece) Despina Papamichail
- (United States) Alycia Parks

The following player received entry as a lucky loser:

- (United States) Catherine Harrison

== Champions ==
=== Singles ===
- (United States) Katie Volynets def. (Romania) Irina Bara, 6–7^{(4–7)}, 7–6^{(7–2)}, 6–1.

=== Doubles ===
- (New Zealand) Erin Routliffe / (Indonesia) Aldila Sutjiadi def. (Japan) Eri Hozumi / (Japan) Miyu Kato, 6–3, 4–6, [10–6]
