= 2021 FineMark Women's Pro Tennis Championship – Doubles =

Doubles
- 2021 FineMark Women's Pro Tennis Championship

Final
- Champions: (New Zealand) Erin Routliffe (Indonesia) Aldila Sutjiadi
- Runners-up: (Japan) Eri Hozumi (Japan) Miyu Kato
- Score: 6–3, 4–6, [10–6]

Events
Singles	Doubles
← 2019 ·	FineMark Women's Pro Tennis Championship	· 2022 →

Alexa Guarachi and Erin Routliffe were the defending champions but Guarachi chose to compete at Rome instead.

Routliffe played alongside Aldila Sutjiadi and successfully defended her title after defeating Eri Hozumi and Miyu Kato 6–3, 4–6, [10–6] in the final.

== Seeds ==
1. (United States) Usue Maitane Arconada / (United States) Caroline Dolehide (quarterfinals)
2. (Kazakhstan) Anna Danilina / (Australia) Arina Rodionova (first round)
3. (Japan) Eri Hozumi / (Japan) Miyu Kato (final)
4. (Indonesia) Beatrice Gumulya / (Indonesia) Jessy Rompies (first round)

== Draw ==
=== Key ===
- Q = Qualifier
- WC = Wild card
- LL = Lucky loser
- Alt = Alternate
- SE = Special exempt
- PR = Protected ranking
- ITF = ITF entry
- JE = Junior exempt
- w/o = Walkover
- r = Retired
- d = Defaulted
- SR = Special ranking

=== Draw ===
First round
1	(United States) UM Arconada (United States) C Dolehide	6	6
(Romania) G Talabă (Mexico) M Zacarías	2	1
Alt	(Georgia (country)) S Shapatava (Hungary) P Udvardy	6^{7}	6^{5}
(United States) H Baptiste (United States) W Osuigwe	7^{9}	7^{7}
3	(Japan) E Hozumi (Japan) M Kato	6	6
(United States) K Ahn (United States) Q Gleason	1	0
(Belarus) V Lapko (Slovakia) T Mihalíková	4	4
(Norway) U Eikeri (United States) C Harrison	6	6
(United Kingdom) N Bains (Romania) I Bara	1	4
(United States) E Bektas (United Kingdom) T Moore	6	6
WC	(United States) E Mandlik (United States) K Volynets	4	6	[13]
4	(Indonesia) B Gumulya (Indonesia) J Rompies	6	4	[11]
WC	(United States) A Parks (United States) S Vickery	7	3	[10]
(New Zealand) E Routliffe (Indonesia) A Sutjiadi	5	6	[12]
WC	(United States) A Krueger (United States) R Montgomery	6	6
2	(Kazakhstan) A Danilina (Australia) Ar Rodionova	2	3

Quarterfinals
1	(United States) UM Arconada (United States) C Dolehide	3	7	[7]
(United States) H Baptiste (United States) W Osuigwe	6	5	[10]
3	(Japan) E Hozumi (Japan) M Kato	6	6
(Norway) U Eikeri (United States) C Harrison	3	2
(United States) E Bektas (United Kingdom) T Moore	6	6^{5}	[11]
WC	(United States) E Mandlik (United States) K Volynets	4	7^{7}	[9]
(New Zealand) E Routliffe (Indonesia) A Sutjiadi	6	6
WC	(United States) A Krueger (United States) R Montgomery	3	3

Semifinals
(United States) H Baptiste (United States) W Osuigwe	5	6	[4]
3	(Japan) E Hozumi (Japan) M Kato	7	2	[10]
(United States) E Bektas (United Kingdom) T Moore	4	6	[6]
(New Zealand) E Routliffe (Indonesia) A Sutjiadi	6	3	[10]

Final
3	(Japan) E Hozumi (Japan) M Kato	3	6	[6]
(New Zealand) E Routliffe (Indonesia) A Sutjiadi	6	4	[10]
