= 2019 FineMark Women's Pro Tennis Championship – Singles =

Singles
- 2019 FineMark Women's Pro Tennis Championship

Final
- Champion: (United States) Lauren Davis
- Runner-up: (United States) Ann Li
- Score: 7–5, 7–5

Events
| Singles | Doubles |
| FineMark Women's Pro Tennis Championship | · 2021 → |

This was the first edition of the tournament.

Lauren Davis won the title after defeating Ann Li 7–5, 7–5 in the final.

== Seeds ==
1. (United States) Madison Brengle (first round)
2. (United States) Taylor Townsend (quarterfinals)
3. (United States) Nicole Gibbs (first round)
4. (United States) Lauren Davis (champion)
5. (United States) Sachia Vickery (quarterfinals)
6. (United States) Whitney Osuigwe (semifinals)
7. (United States) Allie Kiick (first round)
8. (Ukraine) Anhelina Kalinina (first round, retired)

== Draw ==
=== Key ===
- Q = Qualifier
- WC = Wild card
- LL = Lucky loser
- Alt = Alternate
- SE = Special exempt
- PR = Protected ranking
- ITF = ITF entry
- JE = Junior exempt
- w/o = Walkover
- r = Retired
- d = Defaulted
- SR = Special ranking

=== Finals ===
Semifinals
(United States) Francesca Di Lorenzo | 1 | 2
4 | (United States) Lauren Davis | 6 | 6
WC | (United States) Ann Li | 0 | 7 | 6
6 | (United States) Whitney Osuigwe | 6 | 5 | 4

Final
4 | (United States) Lauren Davis | 7 | 7
WC | (United States) Ann Li | 5 | 5

=== Top half ===
First round
1 | (United States) M Brengle | 3 | 5
WC | (United States) S Rogers | 6 | 7
(United States) F Di Lorenzo | 7 | 6
Q | (United States) M Manasse | 5 | 3
Q | (Romania) G Talabă | 7 | 6
(Canada) K Sebov | 5 | 2
Q | (United States) L Chirico | 6 | 6
7 | (United States) A Kiick | 3 | 3
4 | (United States) L Davis | 6 | 6
WC | (United States) S Kelly | 4 | 3
(Russia) S Zhuk | 6 | 2 | 1
WC | (United States) UM Arconada | 1 | 6 | 6
(Paraguay) V Cepede Royg | 6 | 6
(United States) C Dolehide | 1 | 4
(United States) A Kratzer | 6 | 0
8 | (Ukraine) A Kalinina | 4 | 0^{r}

Second round
WC | (United States) S Rogers | 1 | 5
(United States) F Di Lorenzo | 6 | 7
Q | (Romania) G Talabă | 7 | 4 | 6^{1}
Q | (United States) L Chirico | 5 | 6 | 7^{7}
4 | (United States) L Davis | 6 | 7
WC | (United States) UM Arconada | 1 | 5
(Paraguay) V Cepede Royg | 6 | 7^{10}
(United States) A Kratzer | 3 | 6^{8}

Quarterfinals
(United States) F Di Lorenzo | 6 | 3 | 7^{11}
Q | (United States) L Chirico | 4 | 6 | 6^{9}
4 | (United States) L Davis | 3 | 6 | 6
(Paraguay) V Cepede Royg | 6 | 3 | 4

Semifinals
(United States) F Di Lorenzo | 1 | 2
4 | (United States) L Davis | 6 | 6

=== Bottom half ===
First round
5 | (United States) S Vickery | 6 | 6
Q | (Canada) LA Fernandez | 4 | 2
(Australia) K Birrell | 1 | 1^{r}
(Australia) L Cabrera | 6 | 1
(Romania) E-G Ruse | 2 | 4
WC | (United States) A Li | 6 | 6
(United States) R Anderson | 2 | 6 | 6
3 | (United States) N Gibbs | 6 | 4 | 1
6 | (United States) W Osuigwe | 7^{7} | 3 | 6
(United States) A Muhammad | 6^{3} | 6 | 1
(Australia) O Rogowska | 5 | 6 | 2
(United States) C Liu | 7 | 3 | 6
(Australia) E Perez | 6 | 4 | 2
Q | (Mexico) R Zarazúa | 3 | 6 | 6
Q | (Belarus) O Govortsova | 2 | 3
2 | (United States) T Townsend | 6 | 6

Second round
5 | (United States) S Vickery | 7^{7} | 6
(Australia) L Cabrera | 6^{4} | 4
WC | (United States) A Li | 6 | 6
(United States) R Anderson | 3 | 1
6 | (United States) W Osuigwe | 2 | 5
(United States) C Liu | 6 | 0^{r}
Q | (Mexico) R Zarazúa | 6^{3} | 6 | 3
2 | (United States) T Townsend | 7^{7} | 2 | 6

Quarterfinals
5 | (United States) S Vickery | 4 | 2
WC | (United States) A Li | 6 | 6
6 | (United States) W Osuigwe | 6 | 6
2 | (United States) T Townsend | 3 | 0

Semifinals
WC | (United States) A Li | 0 | 7 | 6
6 | (United States) W Osuigwe | 6 | 5 | 4
