= 2025 Jingshan Tennis Open – Men's singles =

Men's singles
- 2025 Jingshan Tennis Open

Final
- Champion: (United States) Eliot Spizzirri
- Runner-up: (Australia) Alex Bolt
- Score: 6–4, 6–4

Events
Singles	men	women
Doubles	men	women
Jingshan Tennis Open	· 2026 →

This was the first edition of the tournament.

Eliot Spizzirri won the title after defeating Alex Bolt 6–4, 6–4 in the final.

== Seeds ==
1. (France) Valentin Royer (withdrew)
2. (United States) Mackenzie McDonald (semifinals)
3. (Czech Republic) Dalibor Svrčina (second round)
4. (Australia) James Duckworth (first round)
5. (Georgia (country)) Nikoloz Basilashvili (second round)
6. (United States) Brandon Holt (first round)
7. (United States) Tristan Boyer (first round)
8. (Canada) Liam Draxl (second round)

== Draw ==
Key

- Q = Qualifier
- WC = Wild card
- LL = Lucky loser
- Alt = Alternate
- ITF = ITF entry
- PR = Protected ranking
- SR = Special ranking
- SE = Special exempt
- JE = Junior exempt
- JR = Junior Accelerator Programme entrant
- CO = College Accelerator Programme entrant
- NG = Next Gen Accelerator Program entrant
- w/o = Walkover
- r = Retired
- d = Defaulted

=== Finals ===
Semifinals
(Germany) Yannick Hanfmann	5	6	4
(United States) Eliot Spizzirri	7	4	6
Q	(Australia) Alex Bolt	6	3	6
2	(United States) Mackenzie McDonald	3	6	3

Final
(United States) Eliot Spizzirri	6	6
Q	(Australia) Alex Bolt	4	4

=== Top half ===
First round
LL	(Kazakhstan) D Yevseyev	6	7
Alt	(Croatia) B Gojo	4	5
(United States) C Smith	6	6
LL	(Colombia) A Soriano Barrera	0	2
(Chinese Taipei) C-h Tseng	6	6
Q	(Chinese Taipei) T-l Wu	3	4
(Germany) Y Hanfmann	6^{2}	7^{8}	6
7	(United States) T Boyer	7^{7}	6^{6}	4
3	(Czech Republic) D Svrčina	6	6
Q	(South Korea) Shin San-hui	1	0
(United States) E Spizzirri	6	6
(Kazakhstan) B Zhukayev	4	1
Q	M Sharipov	3	2
(United States) C Eubanks	6	6
Q	(South Africa) L Harris	6	6
6	(United States) B Holt	4	4

Second round
LL	(Kazakhstan) D Yevseyev	3	6	6
(United States) C Smith	6	3	3
(Chinese Taipei) C-h Tseng	1	7^{7}	0
(Germany) Y Hanfmann	6	6^{4}	6
3	(Czech Republic) D Svrčina	6	4	2
(United States) E Spizzirri	4	6	6
(United States) C Eubanks	5	2
Q	(South Africa) L Harris	7	6

Quarterfinals
LL	(Kazakhstan) D Yevseyev	1	3
(Germany) Y Hanfmann	6	6
(United States) E Spizzirri	7^{7}	0
Q	(South Africa) L Harris	6^{4}	0^{r}

Semifinals
(Germany) Y Hanfmann	5	6	4
(United States) E Spizzirri	7	4	6

=== Bottom half ===
First round
8	(Canada) L Draxl	6	4	7^{7}
(Kazakhstan) T Skatov	4	6	6^{1}
Q	P Bar Biryukov	6^{1}	6^{4}
(United Kingdom) B Harris	7^{7}	7^{7}
Alt	(Australia) O Jasika	4	7^{7}	6
WC	(China) J Cui	6	6^{5}	4
Q	(Australia) A Bolt	6	6^{1}	7^{7}
4	(Australia) J Duckworth	2	7^{7}	6^{5}
5	(Georgia (country)) N Basilashvili	6	6
(Denmark) A Holmgren	2	3
(Australia) B Tomic	6	6
WC	(China) Zhang Tianhui	4	1
(Chinese Taipei) Y-h Hsu	6^{4}	1
Alt	(Belgium) G Onclin	7^{7}	6
WC	(China) R Te	4	4
2	(United States) M McDonald	6	6

Second round
8	(Canada) L Draxl	4	4
(United Kingdom) B Harris	6	6
Alt	(Australia) O Jasika	6	4	1
Q	(Australia) A Bolt	4	6	6
5	(Georgia (country)) N Basilashvili	1	0
(Australia) B Tomic	6	6
Alt	(Belgium) G Onclin	6^{5}	4
2	(United States) M McDonald	7^{7}	6

Quarterfinals
(United Kingdom) B Harris	3	6	3
Q	(Australia) A Bolt	6	2	6
(Australia) B Tomic	5	6^{5}
2	(United States) M McDonald	7	7^{7}

Semifinals
Q	(Australia) A Bolt	6	3	6
2	(United States) M McDonald	3	6	3
