= 2019 FineMark Women's Pro Tennis Championship – Doubles =

Doubles
- 2019 FineMark Women's Pro Tennis Championship

Final
- Champions: (Chile) Alexa Guarachi (New Zealand) Erin Routliffe
- Runners-up: (United States) Usue Maitane Arconada (United States) Caroline Dolehide
- Score: 6–3, 7–6^{(7–5)}

Events
Singles	Doubles
FineMark Women's Pro Tennis Championship	· 2021 →

This was the first edition of the tournament.

Alexa Guarachi and Erin Routliffe won the title after defeating Usue Maitane Arconada and Caroline Dolehide 6–3, 7–6^{(7–5)} in the final.

== Seeds ==
1. (Chile) Alexa Guarachi / (New Zealand) Erin Routliffe (champions)
2. (United States) Ingrid Neel / (United States) Quinn Gleason (quarterfinals)
3. (Belarus) Olga Govortsova / (Australia) Ellen Perez (first round)
4. (United States) Usue Maitane Arconada / (United States) Caroline Dolehide (final)

== Draw ==
=== Key ===
- Q = Qualifier
- WC = Wild card
- LL = Lucky loser
- Alt = Alternate
- SE = Special exempt
- PR = Protected ranking
- ITF = ITF entry
- JE = Junior exempt
- w/o = Walkover
- r = Retired
- d = Defaulted
- SR = Special ranking

=== Draw ===
First round
1	(Chile) A Guarachi (New Zealand) E Routlife	6	7
(United States) M Manasse (Canada) K Sebov	3	5
(United States) K Day (United States) A Kratzer	3	1
(United States) C Gauff (United States) R McAdoo	6	6
3	(Belarus) O Govortsova (Australia) E Perez	6^{6}	6^{2}
WC	(United States) M Brengle (United States) A Glatch	7^{8}	7^{7}
(United States) S Vickery (Mexico) R Zarazúa	2
(Australia) L Cabrera (United States) L Chirico	1^{r}
(Canada) LA Fernandez (Russia) N Kukharchuk	7	6
WC	(Slovakia) M Frantová (United States) C Vernon	5	2
(United States) N Gibbs (United States) S Rogers	3	5
4	(United States) UM Arconada (United States) C Dolehide	6	7
(Kazakhstan) A Danilina (Australia) B Woolcock	6	7
(United States) S Chang (United States) A Mueller	2	5
WC	(United States) C Cummings (Czech Republic) D Zdrubecká	3	1
2	(United States) Q Gleason (United States) I Neel	6	6

Quarterfinals
1	(Chile) A Guarachi (New Zealand) E Routlife	6	6
(United States) C Gauff (United States) R McAdoo	1	3
WC	(United States) M Brengle (United States) A Glatch	w/o
(United States) S Vickery (Mexico) R Zarazúa
(Canada) LA Fernandez (Russia) N Kukharchuk	3	2
4	(United States) UM Arconada (United States) C Dolehide	6	6
(Kazakhstan) A Danilina (Australia) B Woolcock	6	6^{4}	[10]
2	(United States) Q Gleason (United States) I Neel	2	7^{7}	[7]

Semifinals
1	(Chile) A Guarachi (New Zealand) E Routlife	6	6
WC	(United States) M Brengle (United States) A Glatch	2	4
4	(United States) UM Arconada (United States) C Dolehide	6	7^{7}
(Kazakhstan) A Danilina (Australia) B Woolcock	4	6^{4}

Final
1	(Chile) A Guarachi (New Zealand) E Routliffe	6	7^{7}
4	(United States) UM Arconada (United States) C Dolehide	3	6^{5}
