= 2024 FineMark Women's Pro Tennis Championship – Doubles =

Doubles
- 2024 FineMark Women's Pro Tennis Championship

Final
- Champions: (Hungary) Fanny Stollár (New Zealand) Lulu Sun
- Runners-up: (Greece) Valentini Grammatikopoulou (Ukraine) Valeriya Strakhova
- Score: 6–4, 7–5

Events
Singles	Doubles
← 2023 ·	FineMark Women's Pro Tennis Championship	· 2025 →

Makenna Jones and Jamie Loeb were the defending champions but Jones chose not to participate. Loeb partnered alongside Sophie Chang but lost in the quarterfinals to Elvina Kalieva and Maria Mateas.

Fanny Stollár and Lulu Sun won the title, defeating Valentini Grammatikopoulou and Valeriya Strakhova in the final, 6–4, 7–5.

== Seeds ==
1. (Greece) Valentini Grammatikopoulou / (Ukraine) Valeriya Strakhova (final)
2. (United States) Sophie Chang / (United States) Jamie Loeb (quarterfinals)
3. (United Kingdom) Emily Appleton / (United States) Quinn Gleason (quarterfinals)
4. (United States) Anna Rogers / (United States) Alana Smith (first round)

== Draw ==
=== Key ===
- Q = Qualifier
- WC = Wild card
- LL = Lucky loser
- Alt = Alternate
- SE = Special exempt
- PR = Protected ranking
- ITF = ITF entry
- JE = Junior exempt
- w/o = Walkover
- r = Retired
- d = Defaulted
- SR = Special ranking

First round
1	(Greece) V Grammatikopoulou (Ukraine) V Strakhova	6	6
(United States) L Hovde (Australia) M Joint	2	4
WC	(United States) I Barrera Aguirre (Canada) C Jarvis-Tredgett	6	6
WC	(United States) JA Bedard (United States) P Daughters	1	1
4	(United States) A Rogers (United States) A Smith	1	6	[4]
(United States) R Anderson (United States) M Manasse	6	4	[10]
(United States) H Chang (Mexico) AS Sánchez	1	3
(Lithuania) J Mikulskytė (United States) C Rosca	6	6
(Hungary) F Stollár (New Zealand) L Sun	7	6
(Canada) K Sebov (Liechtenstein) K von Deichmann	5	3
WC	(Sweden) I Ferding (Chile) P Goldsmith Weinreich	1	1
3	(United Kingdom) E Appleton (United States) Q Gleason	6	6
(United States) V Osuigwe (United States) W Osuigwe	5	4
(United States) E Kalieva (United States) M Mateas	7	6
M Kozyreva (United States) M Zamarripa	6	3	[8]
2	(United States) S Chang (United States) J Loeb	3	6	[10]

Quarterfinals
1	(Greece) V Grammatikopoulou (Ukraine) V Strakhova	6	6
WC	(United States) I Barrera Aguirre (Canada) C Jarvis-Tredgett	2	3
(United States) R Anderson (United States) M Manasse	4	3
(Lithuania) J Mikulskytė (United States) C Rosca	6	6
(Hungary) F Stollár (New Zealand) L Sun	7	6
3	(United Kingdom) E Appleton (United States) Q Gleason	5	1
(United States) E Kalieva (United States) M Mateas	5	6	[11]
2	(United States) S Chang (United States) J Loeb	7	3	[9]

Semifinals
1	(Greece) V Grammatikopoulou (Ukraine) V Strakhova	2	6	[10]
(Lithuania) J Mikulskytė (United States) C Rosca	6	3	[5]
(Hungary) F Stollár (New Zealand) L Sun	4	6	[10]
(United States) E Kalieva (United States) M Mateas	6	3	[6]

Final
1	(Greece) V Grammatikopoulou (Ukraine) V Strakhova	4	5
(Hungary) F Stollár (New Zealand) L Sun	6	7
