= 2025 Jingshan Tennis Open – Men's doubles =

Men's doubles
- 2025 Jingshan Tennis Open

Final
- Champions: (India) Anirudh Chandrasekar (United States) Reese Stalder
- Runners-up: (Chinese Taipei) Huang Tsung-hao (South Korea) Park Ui-sung
- Score: 6–2, 2–6, [10–7]

Events
Singles	men	women
Doubles	men	women
- Jingshan Tennis Open

This was the first edition of the tournament.

Anirudh Chandrasekar and Reese Stalder won the title after defeating Huang Tsung-hao and Park Ui-sung 6–2, 2–6, [10–7] in the final.

== Seeds ==
1. (Germany) Constantin Frantzen / (Netherlands) Robin Haase (quarterfinals)
2. (Australia) Matthew Romios / (United States) Ryan Seggerman (quarterfinals)
3. (Ecuador) Diego Hidalgo / (United States) Patrik Trhac (first round)
4. (Colombia) Nicolás Barrientos / (Australia) Blake Bayldon (quarterfinals)

== Draw ==
Key

- Q = Qualifier
- WC = Wild card
- LL = Lucky loser
- Alt = Alternate
- ITF = ITF entry
- PR = Protected ranking
- SR = Special ranking
- SE = Special exempt
- JE = Junior exempt
- JR = Junior Accelerator Programme entrant
- CO = College Accelerator Programme entrant
- NG = Next Gen Accelerator Program entrant
- w/o = Walkover
- r = Retired
- d = Defaulted

=== Draw ===
First round
1	(Germany) C Frantzen (Netherlands) R Haase	7^{7}	6
WC	(China) Huang Jilong (China) Xia Zhiheng	6^{3}	1
WC	(China) J Cui (China) R Te	4	6^{3}
(Chinese Taipei) T-h Huang (South Korea) U-s Park	6	7^{7}
4	(Colombia) N Barrientos (Australia) B Bayldon	6	4	[11]
(United States) B Holt (United States) C Smith	4	6	[9]
(Australia) O Jasika (Kazakhstan) D Yevseyev	3	4
(India) RC Bollipalli (India) A Kadhe	6	6
(Canada) L Draxl (United States) E Spizzirri	6	6^{3}	[4]
(India) A Chandrasekar (United States) R Stalder	1	7^{7}	[10]
(Chinese Taipei) R Ho (Chinese Taipei) Y-h Hsu	7	6
3	(Ecuador) D Hidalgo (United States) P Trhac	5	4
(United States) N Lammons (Netherlands) J-J Rojer	7	7
Alt	(Kazakhstan) T Skatov (Kazakhstan) B Zhukayev	5	5
P Bar Biryukov; M Sharipov	6^{5}	3
2	(Australia) MC Romios (United States) R Seggerman	7^{7}	6

Quarterfinals
1	(Germany) C Frantzen (Netherlands) R Haase	7	2	[7]
(Chinese Taipei) T-h Huang (South Korea) U-s Park	5	6	[10]
4	(Colombia) N Barrientos (Australia) B Bayldon	4	6	[9]
(India) RC Bollipalli (India) A Kadhe	6	4	[11]
(India) A Chandrasekar (United States) R Stalder	6	7^{9}
(Chinese Taipei) R Ho (Chinese Taipei) Y-h Hsu	1	6^{7}
(United States) N Lammons (Netherlands) J-J Rojer	7^{7}	6
2	(Australia) MC Romios (United States) R Seggerman	6^{2}	4

Semifinals
(Chinese Taipei) T-h Huang (South Korea) U-s Park	6	6
(India) RC Bollipalli (India) A Kadhe	4	4
(India) A Chandrasekar (United States) R Stalder	4	7	[10]
(United States) N Lammons (Netherlands) J-J Rojer	6	5	[4]

Final
(Chinese Taipei) T-h Huang (South Korea) U-s Park	2	6	[7]
(India) A Chandrasekar (United States) R Stalder	6	2	[10]
