= 2021 FineMark Women's Pro Tennis Championship – Singles =

Singles
- 2021 FineMark Women's Pro Tennis Championship

Final
- Champion: (United States) Katie Volynets
- Runner-up: (Romania) Irina Bara
- Score: 6–7^{(4–7)}, 7–6^{(7–2)}, 6–1

Events
Singles	Doubles
← 2019 ·	FineMark Women's Pro Tennis Championship	· 2022 →

Lauren Davis was the defending champion having won the previous edition in 2019, but chose not to participate.

Katie Volynets won the title after defeating Irina Bara 6–7^{(4–7)}, 7–6^{(7–2)}, 6–1 in the final.

== Seeds ==
1. (United States) Madison Brengle (quarterfinals)
2. (Australia) Astra Sharma (first round, retired)
3. (Egypt) Mayar Sherif (second round)
4. (United States) Kristie Ahn (first round)
5. (Romania) Irina Bara (final)
6. (Mexico) Renata Zarazúa (second round)
7. (Belarus) Olga Govortsova (first round)
8. (China) Wang Xinyu (second round)

== Draw ==
=== Key ===
- Q = Qualifier
- WC = Wild card
- LL = Lucky loser
- Alt = Alternate
- SE = Special exempt
- PR = Protected ranking
- ITF = ITF entry
- JE = Junior exempt
- w/o = Walkover
- r = Retired
- d = Defaulted
- SR = Special ranking

=== Finals ===
Semifinals
WC	(United States) Katie Volynets	5	6	7
Q	(United States) Hanna Chang	7	4	5
Q	(Romania) Irina Fetecău	4	1
5	(Romania) Irina Bara	6	6

Final
WC	(United States) Katie Volynets	6^{4}	7^{7}	6
5	(Romania) Irina Bara	7^{7}	6^{2}	1

=== Top half ===
First round
1	(United States) M Brengle	6	6
WC	(United States) R Montgomery	2	2
Q	(Sweden) M Björklund	4	6	6
(Australia) Ar Rodionova	6	4	1
WC	(United States) K Volynets	6	6
LL	(United States) C Harrison	3	2
PR	(Belarus) V Lapko	4	5
6	(Mexico) R Zarazúa	6	7
3	(Egypt) M Sherif	6	1	6
Q	(United States) V Duval	4	6	3
(United States) F Di Lorenzo	6	6^{6}	7^{7}
(United States) C Dolehide	2	7^{8}	6^{4}
Q	(Japan) K Okamura	2	3
Q	(United States) H Chang	6	6
WC	(United States) H Baptiste	3	3
8	(China) Xin Wang	6	6

Second round
1	(United States) M Brengle	6	6
Q	(Sweden) M Björklund	3	1
WC	(United States) K Volynets	6	6
6	(Mexico) R Zarazúa	1	3
3	(Egypt) M Sherif	4	6	4
(United States) F Di Lorenzo	6	1	6
Q	(United States) H Chang	6	3	6
8	(China) Xin Wang	4	6	1

Quarterfinals
1	(United States) M Brengle	1	2
WC	(United States) K Volynets	6	6
(United States) F Di Lorenzo	3	3
Q	(United States) H Chang	6	6

Semifinals
WC	(United States) K Volynets	5	6	7
Q	(United States) H Chang	7	4	5

=== Bottom half ===
First round
7	(Belarus) O Govortsova	2	7	1
WC	(United States) A Krueger	6	5	6
Q	(United States) A Parks	4	1
(Australia) S Sanders	6	6
(United States) W Osuigwe	4	3
(United States) V Lepchenko	6	6
Q	(Romania) I Fetecău	6	7
4	(United States) K Ahn	3	5
5	(Romania) I Bara	6	6
Q	(Greece) D Papamichail	3	1
(United States) S Vickery	4	1
(United States) UM Arconada	6	6
(Paraguay) V Cepede Royg	3	3
(Poland) M Fręch	6	6
Q	(Japan) YL Miyazaki	4	7	0
2	(Australia) A Sharma	6	5	0^{r}

Second round
WC	(United States) A Krueger	7	4	6^{7}
(Australia) S Sanders	5	6	7^{9}
(United States) V Lepchenko	1^{r}
Q	(Romania) I Fetecău	2
5	(Romania) I Bara	2	6	7
(United States) UM Arconada	6	3	5
(Poland) M Fręch	6	7^{7}
Q	(Japan) YL Miyazaki	4	6^{5}

Quarterfinals
(Australia) S Sanders	6	6^{6}	5
Q	(Romania) I Fetecău	4	7^{8}	7
5	(Romania) I Bara	7^{7}	3	6
(Poland) M Fręch	6^{3}	6	4

Semifinals
Q	(Romania) I Fetecău	4	1
5	(Romania) I Bara	6	6
