= 2024 FineMark Women's Pro Tennis Championship – Singles =

Singles
- 2024 FineMark Women's Pro Tennis Championship

Final
- Champion: (New Zealand) Lulu Sun
- Runner-up: (Australia) Maya Joint
- Score: 6–1, 6–3

Events
Singles	Doubles
← 2023 ·	FineMark Women's Pro Tennis Championship	· 2025 →

Kayla Day was the defending champion, but lost in the first round to Iva Jovic.

Lulu Sun won the title, defeating Maya Joint in the final, 6–1, 6–3.

== Seeds ==
1. (United States) Kayla Day (first round)
2. (New Zealand) Lulu Sun (champion)
3. (United States) Ann Li (semifinals)
4. (Hungary) Tímea Babos (quarterfinals)
5. (Greece) Valentini Grammatikopoulou (first round)
6. (United States) Elvina Kalieva (second round)
7. (Lithuania) Justina Mikulskytė (first round)
8. (United States) Varvara Lepchenko (first round)

== Draw ==
=== Key ===
- Q = Qualifier
- WC = Wild card
- LL = Lucky loser
- Alt = Alternate
- ITF = ITF entry
- PR = Protected ranking
- SR = Special ranking
- SE = Special exempt
- JE = Junior exempt
- JR = Junior Accelerator Programme entrant
- CO = College Accelerator Programme entrant
- NG = Next Gen Accelerator Program entrant
- w/o = Walkover
- r = Retired
- d = Defaulted

=== Finals ===
Semifinals
(Australia) Maya Joint	6^{6}	6	7^{7}
(Liechtenstein) Kathinka von Deichmann	7^{8}	4	6^{2}
3	(United States) Ann Li	3	1
2	(New Zealand) Lulu Sun	6	6

Final
(Australia) Maya Joint	1	3
2	(New Zealand) Lulu Sun	6	6

=== Top half ===
First round
1	(United States) K Day	2	4
Q	(United States) I Jovic	6	6
(United States) J Loeb	6	6
(Mexico) AS Sánchez	3	4
Q	(United States) A Rogers	2	3
(Australia) M Joint	6	6
(United States) L Hovde	7^{7}	6
7	(Lithuania) J Mikulskytė	6^{2}	3
4	(Hungary) T Babos	6	6
Q	(United States) V Osuigwe	4	4
Q	(Bulgaria) L Karatancheva	2	2
WC	(United States) S Chang	6	6
(Liechtenstein) K von Deichmann	7^{7}	6
(Ukraine) V Strakhova	6^{5}	3
SR	(United States) UM Arconada	2	3
6	(United States) E Kalieva	6	6

Second round
Q	(United States) I Jovic	6	6
(United States) J Loeb	1	3
(Australia) M Joint	6^{6}	6	6
(United States) L Hovde	7^{8}	1	1
4	(Hungary) T Babos	7	6
WC	(United States) S Chang	5	3
(Liechtenstein) K von Deichmann	6	6
6	(United States) E Kalieva	1	4

Quarterfinals
Q	(United States) I Jovic	4	2
(Australia) M Joint	6	6
4	(Hungary) T Babos	6^{2}	2
(Liechtenstein) K von Deichmann	7^{7}	6

Semifinals
(Australia) M Joint	6^{6}	6	7^{7}
(Liechtenstein) K von Deichmann	7^{8}	4	6^{2}

=== Bottom half ===
First round
5	(Greece) V Grammatikopoulou	5	5
(United States) L Chirico	7	7
(Canada) K Sebov	5	0
Q	(United Kingdom) E Appleton	7	6
Q	(India) S Yamalapalli	3	0
(Hungary) F Stollár	6	6
(United States) H Chang	2	3
3	(United States) A Li	6	6
8	(United States) V Lepchenko	4	6	4
WC	(United States) A Urhobo	6	3	6
WC	(United States) M Manasse	4	7^{7}	6^{5}
Q	(United States) W Osuigwe	6	6^{5}	7^{7}
(United States) M Mateas	6	6^{3}	6
Q	(Slovakia) M Okáľová	4	7^{7}	0
WC	(Sweden) F Norin	0	0
2	(New Zealand) L Sun	6	6

Second round
(United States) L Chirico	6	6
Q	(United Kingdom) E Appleton	2	1
(Hungary) F Stollár	6	2	5
3	(United States) A Li	1	6	7
WC	(United States) A Urhobo	4	6	7^{7}
Q	(United States) W Osuigwe	6	3	6^{3}
(United States) M Mateas	5	6^{5}
2	(New Zealand) L Sun	7	7^{7}

Quarterfinals
(United States) L Chirico	6	2	3
3	(United States) A Li	4	6	6
WC	(United States) A Urhobo	2	6^{3}
2	(New Zealand) L Sun	6	7^{7}

Semifinals
3	(United States) A Li	3	1
2	(New Zealand) L Sun	6	6
