= 2023 FineMark Women's Pro Tennis Championship – Doubles =

Doubles
- 2023 FineMark Women's Pro Tennis Championship

Final
- Champions: (United States) Makenna Jones (United States) Jamie Loeb
- Runners-up: (United States) Ashlyn Krueger (United States) Robin Montgomery
- Score: 5–7, 6–4, [10–2]

Events
Singles	Doubles
← 2022 ·	FineMark Women's Pro Tennis Championship	· 2024 →

Tímea Babos and Nao Hibino were the defending champions but chose not to participate.

Makenna Jones and Jamie Loeb won the title, defeating Ashlyn Krueger and Robin Montgomery in the final, 5–7, 6–4, [10–2].

== Seeds ==
1. (United States) Sophie Chang / (United States) Angela Kulikov (semifinals)
2. (United States) Kaitlyn Christian / (United States) Sabrina Santamaria (semifinals)
3. (Poland) Katarzyna Kawa / (Mexico) Marcela Zacarías (first round)
4. (United States) Quinn Gleason / (Estonia) Ingrid Neel (first round)

== Draw ==
=== Key ===
- Q = Qualifier
- WC = Wild card
- LL = Lucky loser
- Alt = Alternate
- SE = Special exempt
- PR = Protected ranking
- ITF = ITF entry
- JE = Junior exempt
- w/o = Walkover
- r = Retired
- d = Defaulted
- SR = Special ranking

First round
1	(United States) S Chang (United States) A Kulikov	7	6
(Australia) A Osborne (United States) S Vickery	5	4
WC	(United States) A Zamarripa (United States) M Zamarripa	4	3
(United States) A Rogers (Mexico) R Zarazúa	6	6
4	(United States) Q Gleason (Estonia) I Neel	6^{5}	6^{3}
(United States) M Jones (United States) J Loeb	7^{7}	7^{7}
(Australia) E Bolton (United States) D Hewitt	6	6
(United States) C Rosca (Australia) A Sharma	3	4
(United States) R Anderson (United States) M Mateas	3	1
(United Kingdom) Y Miyazaki (India) P Thombare	6	6
(United States) A Krueger (United States) R Montgomery	6	6
3	(Poland) K Kawa (Mexico) M Zacarías	4	2
(Japan) Y Naito (Australia) O Tjandramulia	6	6
WC	(France) E Bardet (Sweden) I Ferling	3	2
WC	(Sweden) F Norin (Spain) A Retortillo Soiras	2	0
2	(United States) K Christian (United States) S Santamaria	6	6

Quarterfinals
1	(United States) S Chang (United States) A Kulikov	7^{7}	7
(United States) A Rogers (Mexico) R Zarazúa	6^{5}	5
(United States) M Jones (United States) J Loeb	2	7^{7}	[10]
(Australia) E Bolton (United States) D Hewitt	6	6^{3}	[5]
(United Kingdom) Y Miyazaki (India) P Thombare	3	2
(United States) A Krueger (United States) R Montgomery	6	6
(Japan) Y Naito (Australia) O Tjandramulia	3	4
2	(United States) K Christian (United States) S Santamaria	6	6

Semifinals
1	(United States) S Chang (United States) A Kulikov	1	1
(United States) M Jones (United States) J Loeb	6	6
(United States) A Krueger (United States) R Montgomery	7^{7}	2	[10]
2	(United States) K Christian (United States) S Santamaria	6^{4}	6	[7]

Final
(United States) M Jones (United States) J Loeb	5	6	[10]
(United States) A Krueger (United States) R Montgomery	7	4	[2]
