= 2022 FineMark Women's Pro Tennis Championship – Singles =

Singles
- 2022 FineMark Women's Pro Tennis Championship

Final
- Champion: (Romania) Gabriela Lee
- Runner-up: (Poland) Katarzyna Kawa
- Score: 6–1, 6–3

Events
Singles	Doubles
← 2021 ·	FineMark Women's Pro Tennis Championship	· 2023 →

Katie Volynets was the defending champion but retired in the semifinals against Gabriela Lee.

Lee went on to win the title, defeating Katarzyna Kawa in the final, 6–1, 6–3.

== Seeds ==
1. (Romania) Irina Bara (quarterfinals)
2. (Germany) Tatjana Maria (second round)
3. (United States) Katie Volynets (semifinals, retired)
4. (China) Wang Xiyu (semifinals)
5. (United States) CoCo Vandeweghe (first round, retired)
6. (Sweden) Mirjam Björklund (first round)
7. (Poland) Katarzyna Kawa (final)
8. (Romania) Alexandra Cadanțu-Ignatik (quarterfinals)

== Draw ==
=== Key ===
- Q = Qualifier
- WC = Wild card
- LL = Lucky loser
- Alt = Alternate
- SE = Special exempt
- PR = Protected ranking
- ITF = ITF entry
- JE = Junior exempt
- w/o = Walkover
- r = Retired
- d = Defaulted
- SR = Special ranking

=== Finals ===
Semifinals
Q	(Romania) Gabriela Lee	2	7^{7}	1
3	(United States) Katie Volynets	6	6^{5}	0^{r}
4	(China) Wang Xiyu	4	6^{2}
7	(Poland) Katarzyna Kawa	6	7^{7}

Final
Q	(Romania) Gabriela Lee	6	6
7	(Poland) Katarzyna Kawa	1	3

=== Top half ===
First round
1	(Romania) I Bara	6	5	6
Q	(Hungary) T Babos	3	7	2
Q	(United States) S Macavei	3	1
(United States) R Anderson	6	6
WC	(United States) W Osuigwe	6	4	6
(Japan) N Hibino	3	6	4
Q	(Romania) G Lee	6	3
5	(United States) C Vandeweghe	2	1^{r}
3	(United States) K Volynets	6	6
Q	(United Kingdom) T Moore	1	0
(United States) A Kiick	2	6	1
(United States) C Dolehide	6	4	6
(United States) F Di Lorenzo	6	6
(United States) J Loeb	1	3
Q	(United States) C Van Nguyen	2	1
8	(Romania) A Cadanțu-Ignatik	6	6

Second round
1	(Romania) I Bara	6	6
(United States) R Anderson	2	4
WC	(United States) W Osuigwe	1	5
Q	(Romania) G Lee	6	7
3	(United States) K Volynets	6	1	7^{9}
(United States) C Dolehide	2	6	6^{7}
(United States) F Di Lorenzo	2	3
8	(Romania) A Cadanțu-Ignatik	6	6

Quarterfinals
1	(Romania) I Bara	6	1	1
Q	(Romania) G Lee	2	6	6
3	(United States) K Volynets	6	7^{7}
8	(Romania) A Cadanțu-Ignatik	1	6^{3}

Semifinals
Q	(Romania) G Lee	2	7^{7}	1
3	(United States) K Volynets	6	6^{5}	0^{r}

=== Bottom half ===
First round
6	(Sweden) M Björklund	2	2
Q	(United States) K Day	6	6
(United States) A Parks	7	4	7
(United States) E Bektas	5	6	5
Q	(United States) S Chang	6	2	6^{6}
(Mexico) R Zarazúa	1	6	7^{8}
WC	(United States) S Vickery	3	6^{0}
4	(China) Xiy Wang	6	7^{7}
7	(Poland) K Kawa	6	7^{7}
(Mexico) M Zacarías	1	6^{2}
WC	(United States) E Douglas	6	6
WC	(Sweden) F Norin	3	0
Q	(Brazil) G Cé	6	6
(Australia) S Mendez	3	2
O Govortsova	4	0^{r}
2	(Germany) T Maria	6	1

Second round
Q	(United States) K Day	6	7^{7}
(United States) A Parks	1	6^{5}
(Mexico) R Zarazúa	0	3
4	(China) Xiy Wang	6	6
7	(Poland) K Kawa	6	6
WC	(United States) E Douglas	1	3
Q	(Brazil) G Cé	4	6	7^{11}
2	(Germany) T Maria	6	0	6^{9}

Quarterfinals
Q	(United States) K Day	1	5
4	(China) Xiy Wang	6	7
7	(Poland) K Kawa	6	3	6
Q	(Brazil) G Cé	4	6	1

Semifinals
4	(China) Xiy Wang	4	6^{2}
7	(Poland) K Kawa	6	7^{7}
