= 2022 FineMark Women's Pro Tennis Championship – Doubles =

Doubles
- 2022 FineMark Women's Pro Tennis Championship

Final
- Champions: (Hungary) Tímea Babos (Japan) Nao Hibino
- Runners-up: Olga Govortsova (Poland) Katarzyna Kawa
- Score: 6–4, 3–6, [10–7]

Events
Singles	Doubles
← 2021 ·	FineMark Women's Pro Tennis Championship	· 2023 →

Erin Routliffe and Aldila Sutjiadi were the defending champions, but both players chose not to participate.

Tímea Babos and Nao Hibino won the title, defeating Olga Govortsova and Katarzyna Kawa in the final, 6–4, 3–6, [10–7].

== Seeds ==
1. (United States) Emina Bektas / (United Kingdom) Tara Moore (semifinals)
2. (United States) Sophie Chang / (United States) Angela Kulikov (quarterfinals)
3. Olga Govortsova / (Poland) Katarzyna Kawa (final)
4. (Hungary) Tímea Babos / (Japan) Nao Hibino (champions)

== Draw ==
=== Key ===
- Q = Qualifier
- WC = Wild card
- LL = Lucky loser
- Alt = Alternate
- SE = Special exempt
- PR = Protected ranking
- ITF = ITF entry
- JE = Junior exempt
- w/o = Walkover
- r = Retired
- d = Defaulted
- SR = Special ranking

=== Draw ===
First round
(United States) A Parks (United States) S Vickery	6	6
WC	(France) E Bardet (United States) C Vernon	2	3
4	(Hungary) T Babos (Japan) N Hibino	6	6
(United States) T Evans (United States) M Schmidt	0	2
(Czech Republic) M Bayerlová (United States) R McAdoo	4	7^{8}	[10]
(Brazil) G Cé (Lithuania) A Paražinskaitė	6	6^{6}	[5]
(United States) V Osuigwe (Germany) KM Richter	4	5
(United States) A Reami (United States) A Rogers	6	7
(Australia) O Tjandramulia (Mexico) M Zacarías	5	6^{2}
3	O Govortsova (Poland) K Kawa	7	7^{7}
(United States) W Osuigwe (Mexico) R Zarazúa	6	6
(Sweden) F Norin (United States) E Oosterhout	1	1

Quarterfinals
1	(United States) E Bektas (United Kingdom) T Moore	7^{7}	6
(United States) A Parks (United States) S Vickery	6^{3}	1
4	(Hungary) T Babos (Japan) N Hibino	6	6
(Czech Republic) M Bayerlová (United States) R McAdoo	2	2
(United States) A Reami (United States) A Rogers	3	4
3	O Govortsova (Poland) K Kawa	6	6
(United States) W Osuigwe (Mexico) R Zarazúa	2	7	[11]
2	(United States) S Chang (United States) A Kulikov	6	5	[9]

Semifinals
1	(United States) E Bektas (United Kingdom) T Moore	5	3
4	(Hungary) T Babos (Japan) N Hibino	7	6
3	O Govortsova (Poland) K Kawa	6	6
(United States) W Osuigwe (Mexico) R Zarazúa	3	3

Final
4	(Hungary) T Babos (Japan) N Hibino	6	3	[10]
3	O Govortsova (Poland) K Kawa	4	6	[7]
