= Ma Yexin =

Chinese tennis player (born 1999)

Ma Yexin 马烨欣
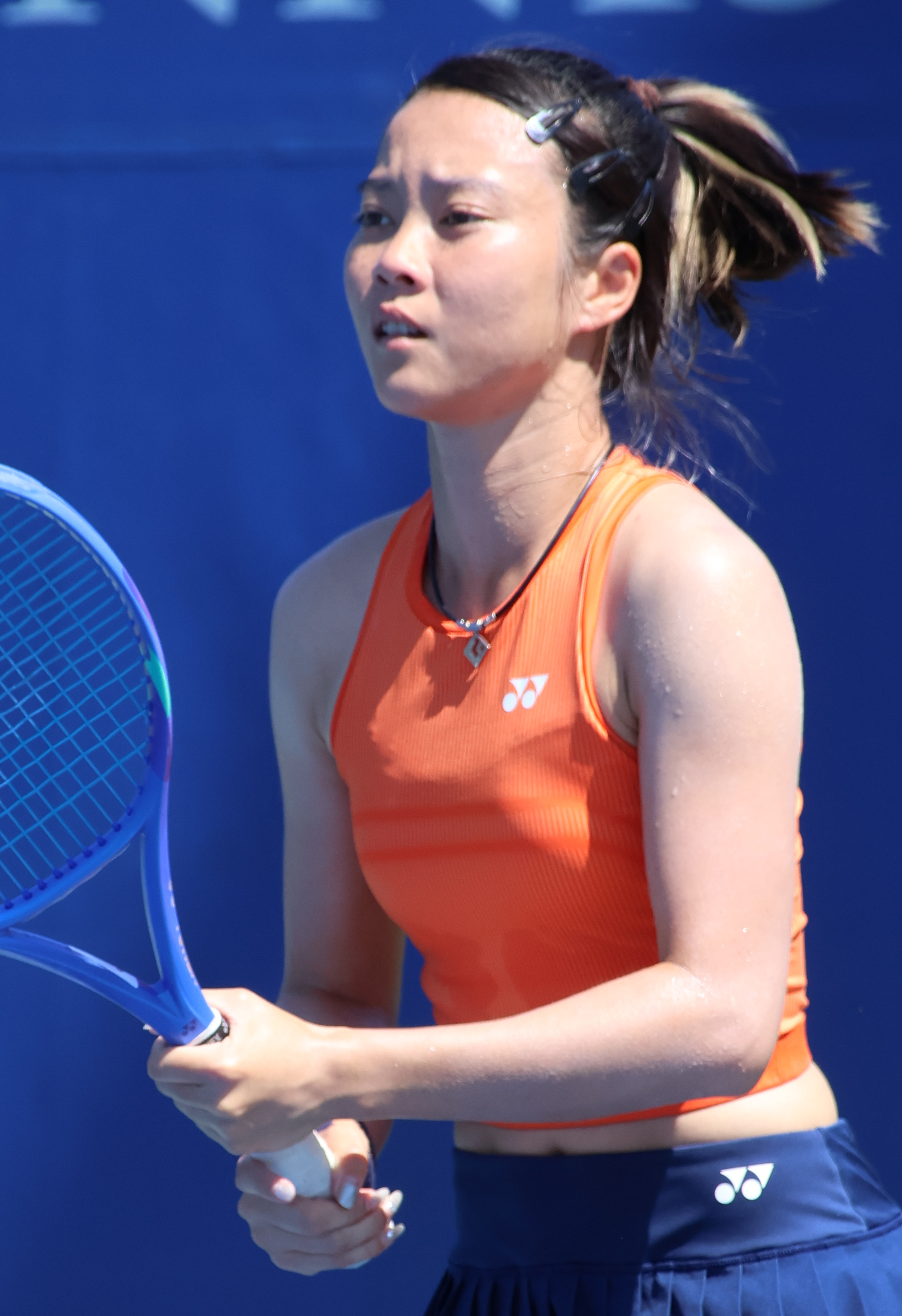
- Ma in 2026
- Country (sports): China
- Born: 10 June 1999 (age 27) Foshan, Guangdong
- Height: 1.63 m (5 ft 4 in)
- Turned pro: 2016
- Plays: Right (two-handed backhand)
- Prize money: $540,427

Singles
- Career record: 320–269
- Career titles: 6 ITF
- Highest ranking: No. 161 (28 September 2026)
- Current ranking: No. 207 (9 November 2026)

Grand Slam singles results
- Australian Open: Q2 (2024, 2026)
- French Open: Q1 (2024, 2026)
- Wimbledon: Q1 (2024, 2026)
- US Open: Q2 (2024)

Doubles
- Career record: 167–138
- Career titles: 12 ITF
- Highest ranking: No. 187 (3 April 2023)
- Current ranking: No. 781 (9 November 2026)
- Last updated on: 9 November 2026.

Ma Yexin (Chinese: 马烨欣; pinyin: Mǎ yèxīn) is a Chinese tennis player. She has a career-high singles ranking of 161 by the WTA, reached on 28 September 2026, and a best doubles ranking of world No. 187, achieved on 3 April 2023.

== Career ==
In 2020, Ma won two tournaments in Antalya, Turkey, with Kazakh partner Zhibek Kulambayeva in doubles.

Ma won her first $40k title in January 2023 at Nonthaburi, Thailand in the doubles draw, partnering with Liang En-shuo. The following week, they won another $40k title at Nonthaburi, beating Lee Pei-chi from Taiwan and Indonesian Jessy Rompies in the final.

She made her WTA Tour main-draw debut as a qualifier at the 2023 Jiangxi Open, losing in the first round to Camila Osorio.

Ma received a wildcard entry to make her maiden main-draw WTA 1000 appearance at the 2024 China Open but lost to Irina-Camelia Begu in the first round, in three sets.

Entering as a lucky loser, she won her first WTA Tour main-draw match at the 2024 Ningbo Open defeating qualifier Xiaodi You, before being eliminated by fourth seed Barbora Krejčíková in the second round.

Ma reached her first WTA 125 final at the 2025 Jingshan Open, losing to Lulu Sun.

At the 2026 Memphis Classic, she defeated world No. 66, Kimberly Birrell, for her second WTA Tour main-draw match win. Ma lost in the second round to sixth seed Caty McNally.

== Early life ==
Ma Yexin was born in Foshan, China on 10 June 1999. From the age of four to twelve years old, she was coached by her father, Ma Dean (马德安). When Ma Yexin graduated from elementary school in 2011, Ma Dean went with her to Beijing to learn from Carlos Rodríguez. After a year and a half, Ma Yexin switched to Peng Shuai's former coach Ma Wei, while training in the Xinghewan Professional Tennis Club at the same time.

== WTA 125 finals ==
=== Singles: 1 (runner-up) ===
Result	Date	Tournament	Surface	Opponent	Score
Loss	Sep 2025	Jingshan Open, China	Hard	(New Zealand) Lulu Sun	4–6, 2–6

== ITF Circuit finals ==
=== Singles: 10 (6 titles, 4 runner-ups) ===
Legend
W60/75 tournaments
W40 tournaments
W35 tournaments
W15 tournaments

Result	W–L	Date	Tournament	Tier	Surface	Opponent	Score
Win	1–0	Oct 2017	ITF Colombo, Sri Lanka	W15	Clay	(India) Prerna Bhambri	6–1, 6–2
Win	2–0	Sep 2021	ITF Monastir, Tunisia	W15	Hard	(Belarus) Aliona Falei	6–4, 6–4
Win	3–0	Nov 2021	ITF Monastir, Tunisia	W15	Hard	(Germany) Julia Middendorf	6–4, 6–2
Win	4–0	May 2022	ITF Chiang Rai, Thailand	W15	Hard	(Japan) Haruna Arakawa	6–4, 6–1
Loss	4–1	May 2023	Kurume Cup, Japan	W60	Carpet	(United States) Emina Bektas	5–7, 7–5, 1–6
Win	5–1	Oct 2023	ITF Nanao, Japan	W40	Carpet	(Chinese Taipei) Yang Ya-yi	7–6^{(6)}, 6–7^{(0)}, 6–0
Loss	5–2	Mar 2024	Traralgon International, Australia	W35	Hard	(Thailand) Lanlana Tararudee	3–6, 5–7
Win	6–2	Apr 2025	ITF Osaka, Japan	W35	Hard	(Chinese Taipei) Liang En-shuo	6–4, 4–6, 6–4
Loss	6–3	May 2025	ITF Andong, South Korea	W35	Hard	(Indonesia) Janice Tjen	4–6, 2–6
Loss	6–4	Mar 2026	Kōfu International Open, Japan	W75	Hard	(Belgium) Sofia Costoulas	5–7, 3–6

=== Doubles: 21 (12 titles, 9 runner-ups) ===
Legend
W60/75 tournaments
W40/50 tournaments
W25 tournaments
W15 tournaments

Result	W–L	Date	Tournament	Tier	Surface	Partner	Opponents	Score
Win	1–0	Oct 2017	ITF Colombo, Sri Lanka	W15	Clay	(Canada) Isabelle Boulais	(France) Joséphine Boualem (Cambodia) Andrea Ka	6–3, 2–6, [10–5]
Loss	1–1	Mar 2019	ITF Nanchang, China	W15	Clay (i)	(Japan) Mei Yamaguchi	(China) Guo Hanyu (China) Zheng Wushuang	0–6, 1–6
Win	2–1	Sep 2019	ITF Anning, China	W15	Clay	(Kazakhstan) Zhibek Kulambayeva	(China) Liu Siqi (China) Sheng Yuqi	6–4, 6–3
Win	3–1	Jan 2020	ITF Antalya, Turkey	W15	Clay	(Kazakhstan) Zhibek Kulambayeva	(Russia) Ksenia Laskutova (Russia) Anna Ureke	6–4, 6–2
Win	4–1	Jan 2020	ITF Antalya, Turkey	W15	Clay	(Kazakhstan) Zhibek Kulambayeva	(Japan) Ayaka Okuno (Germany) Julyette Steur	6–4, 1–6, [10–4]
Win	5–1	Sep 2021	ITF Monastir, Tunisia	W15	Hard	(Japan) Moyuka Uchijima	(Brazil) Ingrid Martins (Argentina) Jazmín Ortenzi	6–2, 2–6, [10–6]
Win	6–1	Sep 2021	ITF Monastir, Tunisia	W15	Hard	(Russia) Ekaterina Reyngold	(France) Yasmine Mansouri (Japan) Himari Sato	6–2, 6–2
Loss	6–2	Sep 2021	ITF Monastir, Tunisia	W15	Hard	(Japan) Honoka Kobayashi	(France) Yasmine Mansouri (Russia) Ekaterina Reyngold	1–6, 3–6
Win	7–2	Oct 2021	ITF Monastir, Tunisia	W15	Hard	(China) Zhuoma Ni Ma	(Croatia) Petra Marčinko (Switzerland) Sebastianna Scilipoti	3–6, 6–4, [10–7]
Loss	7–3	Oct 2021	ITF Monastir, Tunisia	W15	Hard	(China) Zhuoma Ni Ma	(Japan) Mana Ayukawa (Hungary) Rebeka Stolmár	3–6, 4–6
Loss	7–4	Apr 2022	ITF Chiang Rai, Thailand	W25	Hard	(China) Xun Fangying	(Japan) Kyōka Okamura (Thailand) Peangtarn Plipuech	6–4, 3–6, [5–10]
Loss	7–5	Apr 2022	ITF Chiang Rai, Thailand	W15	Hard	(China) Xun Fangying	(Australia) Catherine Aulia (Australia) Talia Gibson	3–6, 6–7^{(5)}
Win	8–5	May 2022	ITF Sarasota, United States	W25	Clay	(Lithuania) Akvilė Paražinskaitė	(Chinese Taipei) Hsieh Yu-chieh (Chinese Taipei) Hsu Chieh-yu	6–2, 7–5
Win	9–5	Oct 2022	ITF Sozopol, Bulgaria	W25	Hard	(Chinese Taipei) Yang Ya-yi	(Romania) Cristina Dinu (China) Lu Jiajing	6–3, 6–1
Win	10–5	Jan 2023	ITF Nonthaburi, Thailand	W40	Hard	(Chinese Taipei) Liang En-shuo	(Japan) Hiroko Kuwata (Ukraine) Kateryna Volodko	6–0, 6–3
Win	11–5	Jan 2023	ITF Nonthaburi, Thailand	W40	Hard	(Chinese Taipei) Liang En-shuo	(Chinese Taipei) Lee Pei-chi (Indonesia) Jessy Rompies	6–3, 2–6, [10–6]
Win	12–5	Mar 2023	ITF Jakarta, Indonesia	W25	Hard	(Japan) Moyuka Uchijima	(Thailand) Luksika Kumkhum (Thailand) Peangtarn Plipuech	6–0, 6–2
Loss	12–6	May 2023	Fukuoka International, Japan	W60	Carpet	(Australia) Alana Parnaby	(United States) Emina Bektas (Israel) Lina Glushko	5–7, 3–6
Loss	12–7	Feb 2024	Burnie International, Australia	W75	Hard	(Australia) Alana Parnaby	(China) Tang Qianhui (China) You Xiaodi	4–6, 5–7
Loss	12–8	May 2025	Kurume Cup, Japan	W50+H	Carpet	(China) Wang Meiling	(Japan) Momoko Kobori (Japan) Ayano Shimizu	1–6, 7–5, [5–10]
Loss	12–9	Jun 2025	Sumter Pro Open, United States	W75	Hard	(Chinese Taipei) Liang En-shuo	(United Kingdom) Tara Moore (United States) Abigail Rencheli	5–7, 2–6
