= Lulu Sun =

New Zealand and Swiss professional tennis player (born 2001)

- Sun at the 2026 Wimbledon Championships
- Country (sports): Croatia (2011–13); Switzerland (Jul 2018–24); New Zealand (2013–18; Apr 2024–)
- Residence: Geneva, Switzerland
- Born: 14 April 2001 (age 25) Te Anau, New Zealand
- Height: 1.73 m (5 ft 8 in)
- Turned pro: 2022
- Plays: Left-handed (two-handed backhand)
- College: University of Texas
- Prize money: US$ 2,147,108

Singles
- Career record: 273–174
- Career titles: 1 WTA 125
- Highest ranking: No. 39 (9 September 2024)
- Current ranking: No. 119 (10 August 2026)

Grand Slam singles results
- Australian Open: 1R (2024, 2025, 2026)
- French Open: 1R (2025)
- Wimbledon: QF (2024)
- US Open: 2R (2025)

Other tournaments
- Olympic Games: 1R (2024)

Doubles
- Career record: 73–57
- Career titles: 4 ITF
- Highest ranking: No. 190 (24 February 2025)
- Current ranking: No. 724 (10 August 2026)

Grand Slam doubles results
- Australian Open: 1R (2025)
- French Open: 2R (2025)
- Wimbledon: 1R (2025)
- US Open: 1R (2024)

Other doubles tournaments
- Olympic Games: 1R (2024)

Team competitions
- BJK Cup: 3–3
- Last updated on: 10 August 2026.

Lulu Sun (Chinese: 孙璐璐; pinyin: Sūn Lùlù; née Radovcic; born 14 April 2001) is a New Zealand professional tennis player. She has a career-high WTA singles ranking of world No. 39 achieved on 9 September 2024 and a best doubles ranking of No. 190, reached on 24 February 2025. She is the current No. 1 player from New Zealand in women's singles.

== Early and personal life ==
Sun was born Lulu Radovcic (Note: Her first name is given as Lucija in tournament draws whilst representing Croatia as a junior, later while living in Bradenton, Florida, and as late as 2015 while living in Switzerland (and representing New Zealand). Hence, it is likely that her birth name was "Lucija" (for which Lulu is a nickname). This has not been officially confirmed to date.) (Croatian: Radovčić) in Te Anau, New Zealand, to a Chinese mother and a Croatian father. Sun briefly lived in Shanghai thereafter. From the age of five she was raised in Geneva, Switzerland, where she completed her school education while still visiting New Zealand to meet family.

Sun attended college in the United States at the University of Texas at Austin, graduating with a bachelor's degree in international relations and global studies in 2022 and completing her degree in just 3 years.

Sun speaks English, French, and Mandarin Chinese fluently; she expressed interest in learning Korean and Japanese.

She has an older sister, Phenomena Sun (born 1998), who played in professional tournaments until 2016.

== Career ==
=== Girls and Juniors ===
At the start of her career Sun, at that time playing under the name Lucija Radovčić, represented Croatia from 2011–2013. In 2013 she competed at the Girls G12 European Nations Challenge, playing together with Oleksandra Oliynykova and Iva Zelić.

As a teenager, Sun entered a number of ITF Women's Circuit events, playing as Lulu Radovcic and later changed her last name to Sun, her mother's maiden name.

Sun represented Switzerland as a junior, finishing runner-up with Violet Apisah in the 2018 Australian Open girls' doubles. She also played under the New Zealand flag at junior Wimbledon that year, losing in the second round in singles and the first round in doubles.

=== 2021–2022: NCAA champion, professional debut ===
Before turning professional, Sun played one season of college tennis for the Texas Longhorns in 2020–21. She went 15–1 on singles court three and 6–1 on court two. In the final of the 2021 NCAA tournament, Sun won the championship-clinching match for the Longhorns to beat Pepperdine 4–3. Sun partnered Kylie Collins in the team's top doubles spot, going 22–4 in dual matches, and they reached the final of the NCAA doubles tournament but fell to North Carolina's Makenna Jones and Elizabeth Scotty.

In May 2022, she won her first big ITF title at the Open Saint-Gaudens, partnering Fernanda Contreras in doubles. She made her WTA Tour main-draw debut at the Morocco Open two days later, where she received a wildcard into the singles draw, but lost to seventh seed Arantxa Rus in the first round.

=== 2024: Wimbledon quarterfinal, WTA 500 final, top 40 ===
Sun made her Grand Slam debut at the Australian Open after qualifying but was defeated in the first round by Elisabetta Cocciaretto.

On her WTA 1000 debut, she recorded her first win at that level at the Dubai Championships as a wildcard, following the retirement of Paula Badosa. She lost to ninth seed Jelena Ostapenko in the second round.

In April, Sun played under the New Zealand flag for the first time as part of the team for the 2024 Billie Jean King Cup. In May, Sun won the singles and doubles titles at the W100 Bonita Springs Championship in Florida. She reached the top 125 on 17 June 2024.

She qualified for the 2024 Wimbledon Championships making her debut at this major and upset eighth seed Zheng Qinwen in the first round. It was her first top 10 win, and also her first completed victory over any player in the top 100. Next, she reached the third round with a win over fellow qualifier Yulia Starodubtseva and the fourth with a win over Zhu Lin. She equalled the feat of reaching the fourth round at the All England Club as the first New Zealand female player in the Open Era, and second after Dame Ruia Morrison in 1957 and 1959. She reached her first quarterfinal with a win over Emma Raducanu becoming the first New Zealand woman to ever reach that stage at Wimbledon in the Open Era. She was only the second woman from New Zealand to reach a major quarterfinal, following Belinda Cordwell at the 1989 Australian Open. Her run finally ended in the quarterfinals where she was beaten in three sets by Donna Vekić. She would go on to represent New Zealand at the 2024 Olympics in singles, where she entered as an alternate, as well as in doubles.

Ranked No. 64, she qualified for the Cincinnati Open making her debut at this WTA 1000, and defeated Linda Nosková in the first round, before losing to 15th seed Marta Kostyuk.

Sun followed this result by reaching her first WTA Tour-level final at the newly upgraded WTA 500 Monterrey Open, with wins over Chloé Paquet, María Lourdes Carlé, Erika Andreeva and third seed Ekaterina Alexandrova. She lost the final to Linda Nosková in straight sets. As a result she reached world No. 41 on 26 August 2024 and the top 40 two weeks later.

At the US Open, Sun retired due to a hip injury after losing the opening set of her first round match against Lucia Bronzetti. Having taken a month off tour, she returned to the court at the China Open, but lost in the first round to Ashlyn Krueger. Sun withdrew from her next scheduled tournament, the Hong Kong Tennis Open, and announced she was bringing an end to her 2024 season.

In December, Sun was named WTA Newcomer of the Year.

=== 2025: First WTA 125 title, Guangzhou final ===
Having suffered opening round defeats in her first four tournaments of the 2025 season, Sun secured her first win of the year at the Abu Dhabi Open, overcoming Caroline Garcia. She lost to eighth seed Leylah Fernandez in the second round.

In March, at the WTA 1000 event in Indian Wells, she defeated Rebecca Šramková and 31st seed Linda Nosková to reach the third round, where her run was ended by eighth seed Zheng Qinwen.

Partnering with Leylah Fernandez, Sun was runner-up in the doubles at the WTA 125 Catalonia Open in May, losing to Bianca Andreescu and Aldila Sutjiadi in the final. The following week at the Italian Open, she defeated wildcard entrant Giorgia Pedone to reach the second round, in which she lost to sixth seed Jasmine Paolini.

Sun lost in the first round at the French Open and Wimbledon to Victoria Mboko and Marie Bouzková respectively.

Moving onto the North American hardcourt swing of the season at the Canadian Open, she defeated Sorana Cîrstea in the first round, but lost her next match to fifth seed Amanda Anisimova. A win over qualifier Antonia Ružić saw Sun into the second round at the Cincinnati Open, at which point she lost to 12th seed Ekaterina Alexandrova. At the US Open, she defeated Camila Osorio to record her first win at a major since the 2024 Wimbledon Championships. Sun lost to 19th seed Elise Mertens in the second round.

In September, Sun won her first WTA 125 title at the Jingshan Open, defeating Ma Yexin in the final.

Having made it through qualifying at the Guangzhou Open in October, she defeated top seed Jéssica Bouzas Maneiro, wildcard entrant Wang Yafan, Caty McNally and qualifier Claire Liu to reach her second WTA Tour final. Sun lost the championship match to second seed Ann Li in straight sets. Despite the loss, she returned to the world's top-100, moving up 28 places to No. 88 on 27 October 2025.

=== 2026: Rankings slide, hiatus ===
Sun lost to qualifier Linda Fruhvirtová in the first round at the Australian Open. Subsequently her form continued to dip, including failing to qualify for the French Open or Wimbledon, and in August, with her ranking having fallen to No. 119, she announced on social media that she was taking an indefinite break from competitive tennis to give herself "space for my wellbeing and to enjoy life beyond the tennis court."

== Performance timelines ==
Key
W	F	SF	QF	#R	RR	Q#	P#	DNQ	A	Z#	PO	G	S	B	NMS	NTI	P	NH

(W) winner; (F) finalist; (SF) semifinalist; (QF) quarterfinalist; (#R) rounds 4, 3, 2, 1; (RR) round-robin stage; (Q#) qualification round; (P#) preliminary round; (DNQ) did not qualify; (A) absent; (Z#) Davis/Fed Cup Zonal Group (with number indication) or (PO) play-off; (G) gold, (S) silver or (B) bronze Olympic/Paralympic medal; (NMS) not a Masters tournament; (NTI) not a Tier I tournament; (P) postponed; (NH) not held; (SR) strike rate (events won / competed); (W–L) win–loss record.
To avoid confusion and double counting, these charts are updated at the conclusion of a tournament or when the player's participation has ended.

=== Singles ===
Current through the 2026 French Open.

Tournament	2022	2023	2024	2025	2026	SR	W–L	Win%
Australian Open	A	A	1R	1R	1R	0 / 3	0–3	0%
French Open	A	A	Q2	1R	Q3	0 / 1	0–1	0%
Wimbledon	Q3	A	QF	1R	Q2	0 / 2	4–2	67%
US Open	A	A	1R	2R	A	0 / 2	1–2	33%
Win–loss	0–0	0–0	4–3	1–4	0–1	0 / 8	5–8	38%

== WTA Tour finals ==
=== Singles: 2 (2 runner-ups) ===
Legend WTA 1000 (–) WTA 500 (0–1) WTA 250 (0–1)	Finals by surface Hard (0–2) Clay (–) Grass (–)	Finals by setting Outdoor (0–2) Indoor (–)

Result	W–L	Date	Tournament	Tier	Surface	Opponent	Score
Loss	0–1	Aug 2024	Monterrey Open, Mexico	WTA 500	Hard	(Czech Republic) Linda Nosková	6–7^{(6–8)}, 4–6
Loss	0–2	Oct 2025	Guangzhou Open, China	WTA 250	Hard	(United States) Ann Li	6–7^{(6–8)}, 2–6

== WTA 125 finals ==
=== Singles: 1 (title) ===
Result	W–L	Date	Tournament	Surface	Opponent	Score
Win	1–0	Sep 2025	Jingshan Open, China	Hard	(China) Ma Yexin	6–4, 6–2

=== Doubles: 1 (runner-up) ===
Result	W–L	Date	Tournament	Surface	Partner	Opponents	Score
Loss	0–1	Apr 2025	Catalonia Open, Spain	Clay	(Canada) Leylah Fernandez	(Canada) Bianca Andreescu (Indonesia) Aldila Sutjiadi	2–6, 4–6

== ITF Circuit finals ==
=== Singles: 12 (7 titles, 5 runner-ups) ===
Legend W100 tournaments (1–0) W80 tournaments (1–0) W60 tournaments (0–1) W50 tournaments (1–0) W25 tournaments (1–2) W15 tournaments (3–2)	Finals by surface Hard (6–4) Clay (1–1)

Result	W–L	Date	Tournament	Tier	Surface	Opponent	Score
Loss	0–1	Oct 2017	ITF Nonthaburi, Thailand	15k	Hard	(South Korea) Choi Ji-hee	2–6, 3–6
Win	1–1	Feb 2019	ITF Port Pirie, Australia	W15	Hard	(United States) Jennifer Elie	6–2, 6–3
Win	2–1	Feb 2019	ITF Perth, Australia	W15	Hard	(United States) Jennifer Elie	7–6^{(1)}, 6–3
Loss	2–2	Nov 2020	ITF Sharm El Sheikh, Egypt	W15	Hard	(Chinese Taipei) Joanna Garland	5–7, 3–6
Win	3–2	Dec 2020	ITF Monastir, Tunisia	W15	Hard	(France) Carole Monnet	6–0, 2–6, 6–2
Loss	3–3	Jun 2021	ITF Palma del Río, Spain	W25	Hard	(Spain) Rebeka Masarova	3–6, 6–1, 6–7^{(4)}
Win	4–3	Jul 2021	ITF Lisbon, Portugal	W25	Hard	(Australia) Ellen Perez	6–4, 6–4
Loss	4–4	Jan 2023	ITF Boca Raton, United States	W25	Clay	(Mexico) Renata Zarazúa	2–6, 5–7
Win	5–4	Aug 2023	Aberto da República, Brazil	W80	Hard	(France) Léolia Jeanjean	6–4, 4–6, 6–2
Loss	5–5	Oct 2023	Rancho Santa Fe Open, United States	W60	Hard	(Ukraine) Yuliia Starodubtseva	5–7, 3–6
Win	6–5	Feb 2024	ITF Roehampton, United Kingdom	W50	Hard (i)	(United Kingdom) Heather Watson	7–5, 7–5
Win	7–5	May 2024	Bonita Springs Championship, United States	W100	Clay	(Australia) Maya Joint	6–1, 6–3

=== Doubles: 10 (4 titles, 6 runner-ups) ===
Legend W100 tournaments (1–0) W60/75 tournaments (2–1) W50 tournaments (1–0) W25 tournaments (0–3) W15 tournaments (0–2)	Finals by surface Hard (2–5) Clay (2–1)

Result	W–L	Date	Tournament	Tier	Surface	Partner	Opponents	Score
Loss	0–1	Jan 2019	Playford International, Australia	W25	Hard	(Australia) Amber Marshall	(Italy) Giulia Gatto-Monticone (Italy) Anastasia Grymalska	2–6, 3–6
Loss	0–2	Nov 2020	ITF Sharm El Sheikh, Egypt	W15	Hard	(Switzerland) Valentina Ryser	(Russia) Ksenia Laskutova (Russia) Daria Mishina	6–7^{(3)}, 7–6^{(2)}, [10–12]
Loss	0–3	Nov 2020	ITF Sharm El Sheikh, Egypt	W15	Hard	(Switzerland) Valentina Ryser	(Russia) Elina Avanesyan (Belarus) Iryna Shymanovich	4–6, 1–6
Loss	0–4	Jun 2021	ITF Palma del Río, Spain	W25	Clay	(Japan) Himari Sato	(Japan) Eri Hozumi (Russia) Valeria Savinykh	6–7^{(6)}, 3–6
Win	1–4	May 2022	Open Saint-Gaudens, France	W60	Clay	(Mexico) Fernanda Contreras Gómez	(Greece) Valentini Grammatikopoulou; Anastasia Tikhonova	7–5, 6–2
Win	2–4	Feb 2023	Georgia's Rome Open, United States	W60	Hard (i)	(Hungary) Fanny Stollár	(Japan) Mana Ayukawa (Czech Republic) Gabriela Knutson	6–3, 6–0
Loss	2–5	Jul 2023	ITF Corroios, Portugal	W25	Hard	(Belgium) Sofia Costoulas	(Australia) Talia Gibson (Australia) Petra Hule	3–6, 6–3, [6–10]
Win	3–5	Feb 2024	Trnava Indoor, Slovakia	W50	Hard (i)	(Japan) Moyuka Uchijima	(Poland) Weronika Falkowska (Hungary) Fanny Stollár	6–4, 7–6^{(3)}
Loss	3–6	Mar 2024	Říčany Open, Czech Republic	W75	Hard (i)	(Hungary) Fanny Stollár	(Czech Republic) Gabriela Knutson (Czech Republic) Tereza Valentová	4–6, 6–3, [4–10]
Win	4–6	May 2024	Bonita Springs Championship, United States	W100	Clay	(Hungary) Fanny Stollár	(Greece) Valentini Grammatikopoulou (Ukraine) Valeriya Strakhova	6–4, 7–6^{(3)}

== Wins over top 10 players ==
- Sun has a 1–5 record against players who were, at the time the match was played, ranked in the top 10.

Season	2024	2025	Total
Wins	1	0	1
Losses	1	4	5

#	Opponent	Rank	Event	Surface	Round	Score	LSR
2024
1.	(China) Zheng Qinwen	8	Wimbledon Championships, UK	Grass	1R	4–6, 6–2, 6–4	123

*As of 26 October 2025

== Junior Grand Slam finals ==
=== Doubles: 1 (runner-up) ===
Result	Year	Tournament	Surface	Partner	Opponents	Score
Loss	2018	Australian Open	Hard	(Papua New Guinea) Violet Apisah	(Chinese Taipei) Liang En-shuo (China) Wang Xinyu	6–7^{(4)}, 6–4, [5–10]
