= FineMark Women's Pro Tennis Championship =

- 2024 FineMark Women's Pro Tennis Championship

ITF Women's Tour
- Event name: FineMark Women's Pro Tennis Championship
- Location: Bonita Springs, Florida, United States
- Venue: Bonita Bay Club
- Category: ITF Women's Circuit
- Surface: Clay
- Draw: 32S/24Q/16D
- Prize money: $100,000
- Website: www.bbcusta.net

The FineMark Women's Pro Tennis Championship is a tournament for professional female tennis players played on outdoor clay courts. The event is classified as a $100,000 ITF Women's Circuit tournament and has been held in Bonita Springs, Florida, United States, since 2019.

== Past finals ==
=== Singles ===
Year	Champion	Runner-up	Score
2026	(Spain) Ángela Fita Boluda	(United States) Akasha Urhobo	6–3, 6–1
2025	(Australia) Astra Sharma	(United States) Whitney Osuigwe	6–2, 6–2
2024	(New Zealand) Lulu Sun	(Australia) Maya Joint	6–1, 6–3
2023	(United States) Kayla Day	(United States) Ann Li	6–2, 6–2
2022	(Romania) Gabriela Lee	(Poland) Katarzyna Kawa	6–1, 6–3
2021	(United States) Katie Volynets	(Romania) Irina Bara	6–7^{(4–7)}, 7–6^{(7–2)}, 6–1
2020	Tournament cancelled due to the COVID-19 pandemic		
2019	(United States) Lauren Davis	(United States) Ann Li	7–5, 7–5

=== Doubles ===
Year	Champions	Runners-up	Score
2026	(Ecuador) Mell Reasco (Czech Republic) Darja Vidmanova	(Bulgaria) Lia Karatancheva (United States) Anna Rogers	7–5, 6–3
2025	Maria Kozyreva; Iryna Shymanovich	(United States) Makenna Jones (United States) Angela Kulikov	6–2, 6–2
2024	(Hungary) Fanny Stollár (New Zealand) Lulu Sun	(Greece) Valentini Grammatikopoulou (Ukraine) Valeriya Strakhova	6–4, 7–5
2023	(United States) Makenna Jones (United States) Jamie Loeb	(United States) Ashlyn Krueger (United States) Robin Montgomery	5–7, 6–4, [10–2]
2022	(Hungary) Tímea Babos (Japan) Nao Hibino	Olga Govortsova (Poland) Katarzyna Kawa	6–4, 3–6, [10–7]
2021	(New Zealand) Erin Routliffe (Indonesia) Aldila Sutjiadi	(Japan) Eri Hozumi (Japan) Miyu Kato	6–3, 4–6, [10–6]
2020	Tournament cancelled due to the COVID-19 pandemic		
2019	(Chile) Alexa Guarachi (New Zealand) Erin Routliffe	(United States) Usue Maitane Arconada (United States) Caroline Dolehide	6–3, 7–6^{(7–5)}
