= Hina Inoue =

American tennis player (born 2003)

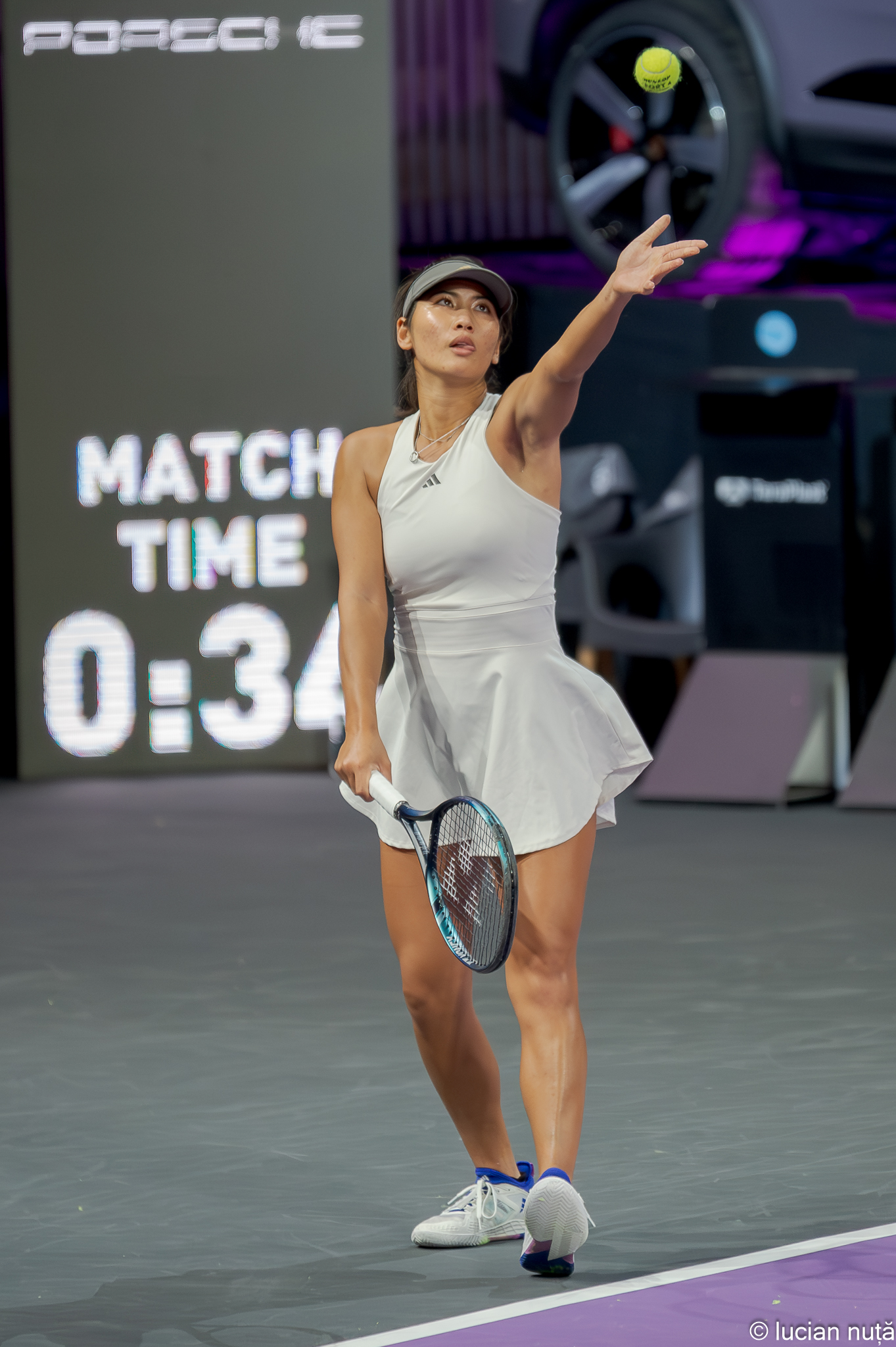
- Inoue at the 2025 Transylvania Open
- Country (sports): United States
- Born: June 1, 2003 (age 23)
- Plays: Right (two-handed backhand)
- Prize money: $308,903

Singles
- Career record: 232–146
- Career titles: 8 ITF
- Highest ranking: No. 203 (July 14, 2025)
- Current ranking: No. 317 (October 19, 2026)

Grand Slam singles results
- French Open: Q1 (2025)
- Wimbledon: Q2 (2025)
- US Open: 1R (2025)

Doubles
- Career record: 26–34
- Career titles: 1 ITF
- Highest ranking: No. 520 (November 7, 2022)
- Current ranking: No. 1,082 (October 19, 2026)
- Last updated on: October 24, 2026.

Hina Inoue (born June 1, 2003) is an American tennis player. As of 2025, she trains at Bradenton Tennis Club in Florida.

Inoue has a career-high singles ranking by the WTA of 203, achieved on 14 July 2025. She also has a career-high doubles ranking of 520, reached on 7 November 2022.

Inoue won her first W50 title at the ITF event in Guiyang.

She made her WTA Tour debut as a qualifier at the 2024 Hong Kong Open, losing to Wang Xiyu in the first round.

Inoue made her major main-draw debut at the 2025 US Open.

== ITF Circuit finals ==
=== Singles: 16 (8 titles, 8 runner-ups) ===
Legend W50 tournaments W35 tournaments W15 tournaments	Finals by surface Hard (8–8)

Result	W–L	Date	Location	Tier	Surface	Opponent	Score
Win	1–0	Dec 2021	ITF Cancún, Mexico	W15	Hard	(United States) Madison Sieg	6–2, 6–2
Win	2–0	Jan 2022	ITF Cancún, Mexico	W15	Hard	(Mexico) María Portillo Ramírez	1–6, 6–3, 7–6^{(6)}
Loss	2–1	Oct 2023	ITF Monastir, Tunisia	W15	Hard	(India) Zeel Desai	2–6, 4–6
Win	3–1	Oct 2023	ITF Monastir, Tunisia	W15	Hard	(Benin) Gloriana Nahum	6–3, 6–2
Win	4–1	Apr 2024	ITF Monastir, Tunisia	W15	Hard	(Finland) Anastasia Kulikova	6–2, 3–2 ret.
Win	5–1	Apr 2024	ITF Monastir, Tunisia	W15	Hard	(United States) Sara Daavettila	2–6, 7–6^{(2)}, 6–4
Win	6–1	Jul 2024	ITF Tianjin, China	W35	Hard	(China) Liu Fangzhou	6–4, 6–3
Loss	6–2	Jul 2024	ITF Tianjin, China	W35	Hard	(China) Wei Sijia	7–6^{(4)}, 2–6, 3–6
Win	7–2	Sep 2024	ITF Guiyang, China	W50	Hard	(Russia) Alexandra Shubladze	7–6^{(4)}, 6–1
Loss	7–3	Nov 2024	Yokohama Challenger, Japan	W50	Hard	(Russia) Aliona Falei	6–3, 1–6, 4–6
Loss	7–4	Apr 2025	ITF Monastir, Tunisia	W15	Hard	(Switzerland) Alina Granwehr	5–7, 6–7^{(1)}
Win	8–4	Apr 2025	ITF Monastir, Tunisia	W15	Hard	(Denmark) Johanne Svendsen	6–2, 6–0
Loss	8–5	Nov 2025	ITF Chihuahua, Mexico	W50	Hard	Anastasia Tikhonova	4–6, 5–7
Loss	8–6	Apr 2026	ITF Osaka, Japan	W35	Hard	(Japan) Kyōka Okamura	4–6, 4–6
Loss	8–7	May 2026	ITF Wuning, China	W35	Hard	Alexandra Shubladze	4–6, 1–6
Loss	8–8	Jul 2026	ITF Santa Fe, United States	W35	Hard	(United States) Malaika Rapolu	2–6, 0–6

=== Doubles: 3 (1 title, 2 runner-ups) ===
Legend W25 tournaments W15 tournaments	Finals by surface Hard (1–1) Clay (0–1)

Result	W–L	Date	Tournament	Tier	Surface	Partner	Opponents	Score
Win	1–0	Jan 2022	ITF Cancún, Mexico	W15	Hard	(Japan) Natsuho Arakawa	(France) Julie Belgraver (France) Jade Bornay	6–4, 7–5
Loss	1–1	May 2022	ITF Daytona Beach, United States	W25	Clay	(Switzerland) Chelsea Fontenel	(Chinese Taipei) Hsieh Yu-chieh (Chinese Taipei) Hsu Chieh-yu	5–7, 0–6
Loss	1–2	Jun 2022	ITF Santo Domingo, Dominican Republic	W25	Hard	(United States) Taylor Ng	(France) Tiphanie Lemaître (Ecuador) Mell Reasco	4–6, 4–6
