= Gabriela Lee =

Romanian tennis player (born 1995)

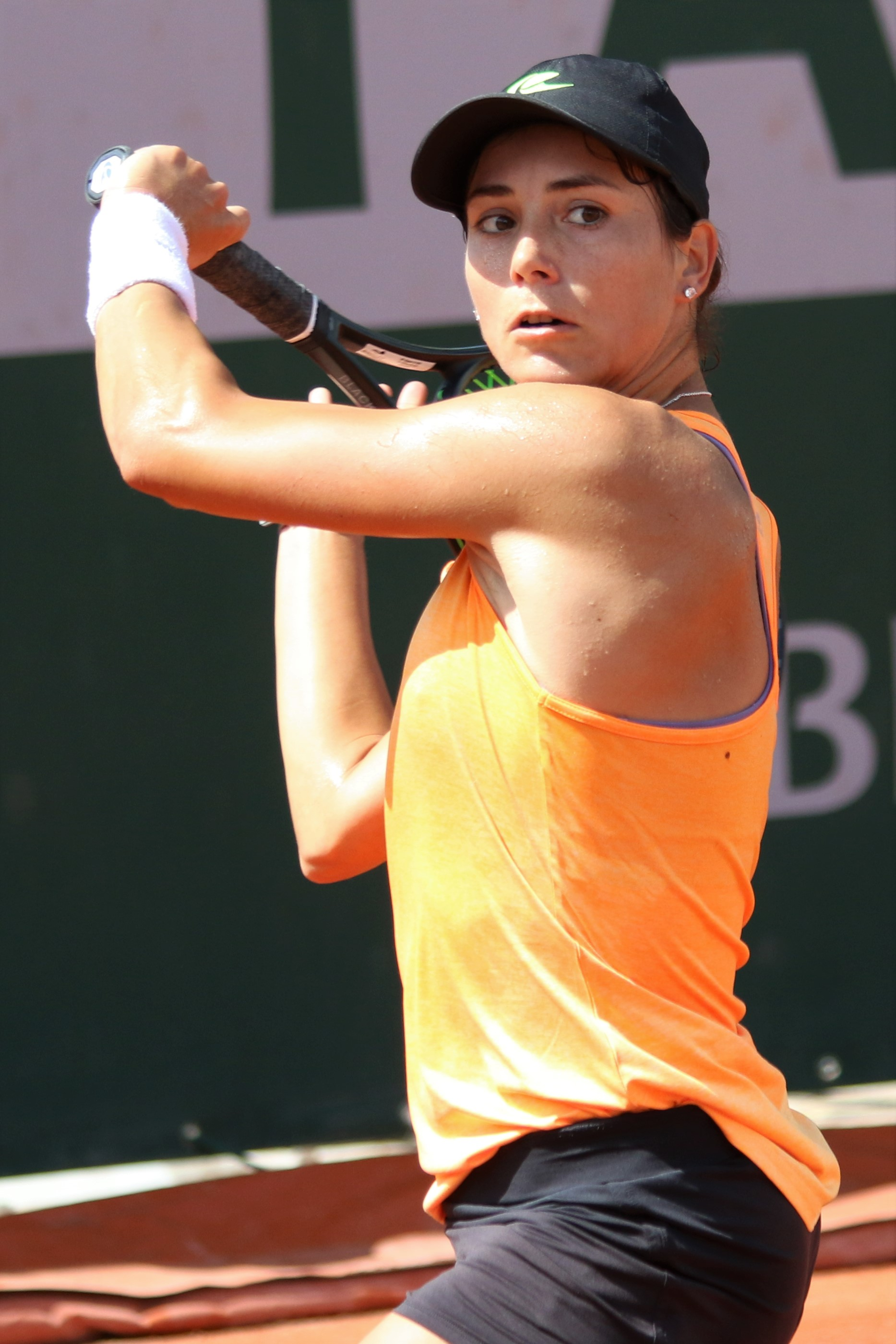
- Lee at the 2022 French Open
- Full name: Gabriela Talabă Lee
- Country (sports): Romania
- Born: 23 August 1995 (age 31) Galați, Romania
- Height: 1.72 m (5 ft 8 in)
- Plays: Left (one-handed backhand)
- College: Texas Tech University
- Prize money: $453,829

Singles
- Career record: 297–254
- Career titles: 6 ITF
- Highest ranking: No. 136 (1 August 2022)
- Current ranking: No. 917 (2 November 2026)

Grand Slam singles results
- Australian Open: Q1 (2021, 2022, 2023)
- French Open: Q2 (2021)
- Wimbledon: Q1 (2021, 2022)
- US Open: Q2 (2022)

Doubles
- Career record: 157–142
- Career titles: 10 ITF
- Highest ranking: No. 229 (1 August 2022)
- Current ranking: No. 1,241 (2 November 2026)
- Last updated on: 8 November 2026.

Gabriela Lee (née Talabă; born 23 August 1995) is an inactive Romanian tennis player.

She has a career-high WTA singles ranking of 136, achieved on 1 August 2022, and a best doubles ranking of world No. 229, set on the same date. She has won six singles and ten doubles titles on the ITF Women's Circuit.

== Career ==
Lee played collegiate tennis at Texas Tech University. She helped the Lady Raiders to four straight NCAA tournament berths, four straight Sweet 16 appearances, two Elite Eight appearances and the highest ranking in program history (No. 5).

She made her WTA Tour doubles main-draw debut at the Lexington Open, having received a wildcard into the doubles tournament, partnering Caitlin Whoriskey.

In September 2020, Lee entered the qualifying round of the French Open, her first Grand Slam tournament ever played. However, she lost her first match against Clara Tauson from Denmark.

She qualified for the 2021 Charleston Open main draw making her WTA Tour and WTA 500 singles debuts. She lost to eventual runner-up Danka Kovinić in the first round.

Lee recorded her first WTA Tour match win at the 2021 Poland Open as a lucky loser over Cypriot qualifier Raluca Serban.

In 2022, she qualified into the main draw of the Charleston Open for a second year in a row but lost to Jasmine Paolini.

Lee gained direct entry into the 2023 Morocco Open, losing her opening match to Léolia Jeanjean.

Having qualified for the 2023 Montevideo Open, Lee defeated wildcard entrant Lucía de Santa Ana to reach the second round, where she was double baggled by second seed and eventual champion Renata Zarazúa.

Ranked No. 313, she also qualified for the singles main draw at the 2024 Charleston Open but lost to Ashlyn Krueger. Despite the loss she returned to the top 300. Later that year, Lee qualified for the LTP Charleston Pro Tennis, where wins over lucky loser Kayla Cross and eighth seed Iva Jovic saw her reach the quarterfinals, at which point her run was ended by wildcard entrant Lauren Davis in three sets.

== WTA 125 finals ==
=== Doubles: 1 (runner-up) ===
Result	Date	Tournament	Surface	Partner	Opponents	Score
Loss	Sep 2025	Open de San Sebastián, Spain	Clay	(United States) Elvina Kalieva	Anastasia Tikhonova (Croatia) Tara Würth	3–6, 0–6

== ITF Circuit finals ==
=== Singles: 11 (6 titles, 5 runner-ups) ===
Legend
W100 tournaments (1–0)
W75 tournaments (0–2)
W50 tournaments (1–0)
W25 tournaments (2–2)
W10/15 tournaments (2–1)

Result	W–L	Date	Tournament	Tier	Surface	Opponent	Score
Loss	0–1	Aug 2014	ITF Bucharest, Romania	W10	Clay	(Romania) Cristina Stancu	4–6, 6–3, 2–6
Loss	0–2	Jul 2016	ITF Târgu Jiu, Romania	W10	Clay	(Romania) Jaqueline Cristian	6–7^{(5)}, 3–6
Win	1–2	Aug 2017	ITF Bucharest, Romania	W15	Clay	(Argentina) Victoria Bosio	7–5, 6–4
Win	2–2	Sep 2018	ITF Marbella, Spain	W15	Clay	(Bulgaria) Aleksandrina Naydenova	6–2, 6–2
Win	3–2	Oct 2018	ITF Charleston Pro, United States	W25	Clay	(United States) Elizabeth Halbauer	6–4, 6–7^{(5)}, 6–2
Win	4–2	Sep 2019	ITF Redding, United States	W25	Hard	(United States) Alycia Parks	6–1, 6–1
Loss	4–3	Sep 2020	ITF Frýdek-Místek, Czech Republic	W25	Clay	(China) Zheng Qinwen	6–3, 4–6, 0–6
Win	5–3	May 2022	Bonita Springs Championship, US	W100	Clay	(Poland) Katarzyna Kawa	6–1, 6–3
Loss	5–4	Jan 2024	Vero Beach Open, US	W75+H	Clay	(Argentina) María Lourdes Carlé	4–6, 6–7^{(4)}
Win	6–4	May 2025	ITF Pelham, United States	W50	Clay	(United States) Robin Anderson	6–3, 6–1
Loss	6–5	Jul 2025	ITS Cup Olomouc, Czech Republic	W75	Clay	(Mexico) Ana Sofía Sánchez	5–7, 7–5, 3–6

=== Doubles: 18 (10 titles, 8 runner-ups) ===
Legend
W60 tournaments (0–1)
W25 tournaments (4–3)
W10/15 tournaments (6–4)

Result	W–L	Date	Tournament	Tier	Surface	Partner	Opponents	Score
Loss	0–1	Jun 2013	ITF Balș, Romania	W10	Clay	(Romania) Oana Georgeta Simion	(Romania) Jaqueline Cristian (Romania) Raluca Elena Platon	6–7^{(4)}, 4–6
Loss	0–2	Dec 2013	ITF Antalya, Turkey	W10	Clay	(Romania) Patricia Maria Țig	(Romania) Irina Bara (Switzerland) Conny Perrin	3–6, 1–6
Loss	0–3	Feb 2014	ITF Antalya, Turkey	W10	Clay	(Romania) Patricia Maria Țig	(China) Li Yihong (China) Zhu Lin	2–6, ret.
Loss	0–4	Jul 2014	ITF Iași, Romania	W10	Clay	(Romania) Oana Georgeta Simion	(Romania) Raluca Elena Platon (Romania) Cristina Stancu	6–2, 4–6, [6–10]
Win	1–4	Jun 2015	ITF Galați, Romania	W10	Clay	(Romania) Oana Georgeta Simion	(Moldova) Daniela Ciobanu (Romania) Camelia Hristea	4–6, 7–5, [10–8]
Win	2–4	Jul 2016	ITF Focșani, Romania	W10	Clay	(Romania) Oana Georgeta Simion	(Moldova) Daniela Ciobanu (France) Kassandra Davesne	5–7, 6–1, [10–6]
Win	3–4	Aug 2016	ITF Galați, Romania	W10	Clay	(Romania) Oana Georgeta Simion	(Romania) Karola Patricia Bejenaru (Romania) Georgia Crăciun	5–7, 6–4, [10–3]
Win	4–4	Aug 2017	ITF Bucharest, Romania	W15	Clay	(Romania) Oana Georgeta Simion	(Romania) Elena Bogdan (Romania) Elena-Teodora Cadar	6–3, 0–6, [12–10]
Loss	4–5	Jun 2018	ITF Baton Rouge, US	W25	Hard	(Australia) Astra Sharma	(United States) Hayley Carter (United States) Ena Shibahara	3–6, 4–6
Win	5–5	Jul 2018	ITF Horb, Germany	W25	Hard	(Romania) Oana Georgeta Simion	(Slovakia) Jana Jablonovská (Slovakia) Vivien Juhászová	6–3, 6–0
Win	6–5	Sep 2018	ITF Marbella, Spain	W15	Clay	(Spain) Claudia Hoste Ferrer	(Spain) Ana Lantigua de la Nuez (Spain) Ángeles Moreno Barranquero	6–2, 6–2
Win	7–5	Sep 2018	ITF Varna, Bulgaria	W15	Clay	(Venezuela) Aymet Uzcátegui	(Turkey) İpek Öz (Turkey) Melis Sezer	3–6, 7–5, [10–5]
Loss	7–6	Oct 2018	Charleston Pro, US	W25	Clay	(Chinese Taipei) Hsu Chieh-yu	(United States) Sophie Chang (United States) Alexandra Mueller	4–6, 4–6
Loss	7–7	Apr 2019	ITF Pelham, US	W25	Clay	(Romania) Oana Georgeta Simion	(United States) Usue Maitane Arconada (United States) Caroline Dolehide	3–6, 0–6
Win	8–7	Aug 2019	ITF Fort Worth, US	W25	Hard	(Chinese Taipei) Hsu Chieh-yu	(United States) Elysia Bolton (United States) Jada Hart	7–6^{(8)}, 7–5
Win	9–7	Aug 2019	ITF Guayaquil, Ecuador	W25	Clay	(United States) Katerina Stewart	(Colombia) Yuliana Lizarazo (Colombia) Camila Osorio	6–7^{(1)}, 7–6^{(6)}, [10–7]
Loss	9–8	Sep 2019	Templeton Pro, US	W60	Hard	(Mexico) Marcela Zacarías	(Montenegro) Vladica Babić (United States) Caitlin Whoriskey	4–6, 2–6
Win	10–8	Nov 2019	ITF Naples, US	W25	Clay	(Mexico) María Portillo Ramírez	(Croatia) Lea Bošković (Australia) Seone Mendez	7–5, 6–2
