= 2022 LTP Charleston Pro Tennis 2 – Singles =

Singles
- 2022 LTP Charleston Pro Tennis 2

Final
- Champion: (Canada) Carol Zhao
- Runner-up: (Japan) Himeno Sakatsume
- Score: 3–6, 6–4, 6–4

Events
Singles	Doubles
← 2021 ·	LTP Charleston Pro Tennis	· 2023 →

Despina Papamichail was the defending champion but lost in the second round to Victoria Duval.

Carol Zhao won the title, defeating Himeno Sakatsume in the final, 3–6, 6–4, 6–4.

== Seeds ==
1. (United States) Alycia Parks (second round)
2. (Greece) Despina Papamichail (second round)
3. (Czech Republic) Linda Fruhvirtová (quarterfinals)
4. (United States) Caroline Dolehide (second round)
5. (Switzerland) Joanne Züger (second round)
6. (United States) Jamie Loeb (first round)
7. (United States) Emma Navarro (second round)
8. (Mexico) Marcela Zacarías (second round)

== Draw ==
=== Key ===
- Q = Qualifier
- WC = Wild card
- LL = Lucky loser
- Alt = Alternate
- ITF = ITF entry
- PR = Protected ranking
- SR = Special ranking
- SE = Special exempt
- JE = Junior exempt
- JR = Junior Accelerator Programme entrant
- CO = College Accelerator Programme entrant
- NG = Next Gen Accelerator Program entrant
- w/o = Walkover
- r = Retired
- d = Defaulted

=== Finals ===
Semifinals
(Canada) Carol Zhao	7^{7}	6
(United States) Sachia Vickery	6^{4}	2
Q	(United States) Maegan Manasse	2	0^{r}
Q	(Japan) Himeno Sakatsume	6	0

Final
(Canada) Carol Zhao	3	6	6
Q	(Japan) Himeno Sakatsume	6	4	4

=== Top half ===
First round
1	(United States) A Parks	4	6	6
WC	(United States) J Aney	6	2	4
(Chinese Taipei) E-s Liang	5	3
(United States) A Krueger	7	6
(Canada) C Zhao	6	6
WC	(Serbia) K Jokić	1	2
(United States) H Chang	4	3
7	(United States) E Navarro	6	6
4	(United States) C Dolehide	6	3	6
(United States) E Halbauer	2	6	4
(United States) E Mandlik	6	7
PR	(Colombia) E Arango	4	5
(United States) S Vickery	4	6	6
(Switzerland) C Perrin	6	1	3
Q	(Bolivia) N Zeballos	1	2
5	(Switzerland) J Züger	6	6

Second round
1	(United States) A Parks	6^{4}	3
(United States) A Krueger	7^{7}	6
(Canada) C Zhao	5	7	6
7	(United States) E Navarro	7	5	3
4	(United States) C Dolehide	6	3	3
(United States) E Mandlik	4	6	6
(United States) S Vickery	6^{1}	6	6
5	(Switzerland) J Züger	7^{7}	4	0

Quarterfinals
(United States) A Krueger	4	6	6^{2}
(Canada) C Zhao	6	4	7^{7}
(United States) E Mandlik	6	5	1
(United States) S Vickery	1	7	6

Semifinals
(Canada) C Zhao	7^{7}	6
(United States) S Vickery	6^{4}	2

=== Bottom half ===
First round
6	(United States) J Loeb	2	1
Q	(United States) M Manasse	6	6
WC	(United States) D Hewitt	4	6	6
Q	(United States) E Oosterhout	6	4	4
Q	(United States) C Van Nguyen	6	6
(Hungary) T Babos	4	4
Q	(United States) R McAdoo	1	5
3	(Czech Republic) L Fruhvirtová	6	7
8	(Mexico) M Zacarías	6	6
Q	(United States) C Rosca	3	1
Q	(Japan) H Sakatsume	6	6
(United States) S Chang	4	3
Q	(India) R Bhatia	2	2
(United States) V Duval	6	6
(United States) E Douglas	7^{7}	3	4
2	(Greece) D Papamichail	6^{5}	6	6

Second round
Q	(United States) M Manasse	7^{7}	5	6
WC	(United States) D Hewitt	6^{5}	7	1
Q	(United States) C Van Nguyen	6	0^{r}
3	(Czech Republic) L Fruhvirtová	3	4
8	(Mexico) M Zacarías	1	4
Q	(Japan) H Sakatsume	6	6
(United States) V Duval	7	6
2	(Greece) D Papamichail	5	1

Quarterfinals
Q	(United States) M Manasse	6	6
3	(Czech Republic) L Fruhvirtová	2	3
Q	(Japan) H Sakatsume	6	5	6
(United States) V Duval	2	7	4

Semifinals
Q	(United States) M Manasse	2	0^{r}
Q	(Japan) H Sakatsume	6	0
