= 2022 LTP Charleston Pro Tennis 2 – Doubles =

Doubles
- 2022 LTP Charleston Pro Tennis 2

Final
- Champions: (United States) Alycia Parks (United States) Sachia Vickery
- Runners-up: (Hungary) Tímea Babos (Mexico) Marcela Zacarías
- Score: 6–4, 5–7, [10–5]

Events
Singles	Doubles
← 2021 ·	LTP Charleston Pro Tennis	· 2023 →

Fanny Stollár and Aldila Sutjiadi were the defending champions but chose not to participate.

Alycia Parks and Sachia Vickery won the title, defeating Tímea Babos and Marcela Zacarías in the final, 6–4, 5–7, [10–5].

== Seeds ==
1. (United States) Sophie Chang / (United States) Angela Kulikov (semifinals, withdrew)
2. (Hungary) Tímea Babos / (Mexico) Marcela Zacarías (final)
3. (Chinese Taipei) Liang En-shuo / (Switzerland) Conny Perrin (semifinals)
4. (United States) Jessie Aney / (United States) Jamie Loeb (quarterfinals)

== Draw ==
=== Key ===
- Q = Qualifier
- WC = Wild card
- LL = Lucky loser
- Alt = Alternate
- SE = Special exempt
- PR = Protected ranking
- ITF = ITF entry
- JE = Junior exempt
- w/o = Walkover
- r = Retired
- d = Defaulted
- SR = Special ranking

=== Draw ===
First round
1	(United States) S Chang (United States) A Kulikov	6	6
(United States) A Zamarripa (United States) M Zamarripa	3	4
(India) P Thombare (Switzerland) J Züger	6	6
WC	(United States) V Osuigwe (United States) K Pierre-Louis	1	0
4	(United States) J Aney (United States) J Loeb	6	6
(United States) D Ivanova (Bolivia) N Zeballos	2	3
(United States) A Parks (United States) S Vickery	6	2	[10]
(Czech Republic) L Fruhvirtová (United States) A Krueger	3	6	[8]
(United States) E Bolton (United States) M Manasse	2^{r}
WC	(United States) C Dolehide (United States) S Dolehide	2
(United States) A Rogers (United States) C Rosca	4	4
3	(Chinese Taipei) E-s Liang (Switzerland) C Perrin	6	6
(United States) E Douglas (Serbia) K Jokić	6	4	[7]
(United States) M Mateas (Greece) D Papamichail	3	6	[10]
(United States) D Hewitt (United States) R McAdoo	1	4
2	(Hungary) T Babos (Mexico) M Zacarías	6	6

Quarterfinals
1	(United States) S Chang (United States) A Kulikov	6	6
(India) P Thombare (Switzerland) J Züger	3	2
4	(United States) J Aney (United States) J Loeb	2	3
(United States) A Parks (United States) S Vickery	6	6
WC	(United States) C Dolehide (United States) S Dolehide	6	4	[5]
3	(Chinese Taipei) E-s Liang (Switzerland) C Perrin	3	6	[10]
(United States) M Mateas (Greece) D Papamichail	2	1
2	(Hungary) T Babos (Mexico) M Zacarías	6	6

Semifinals
1	(United States) S Chang (United States) A Kulikov
(United States) A Parks (United States) S Vickery	w/o
3	(Chinese Taipei) E-s Liang (Switzerland) C Perrin	1	3
2	(Hungary) T Babos (Mexico) M Zacarías	6	6

Final
(United States) A Parks (United States) S Vickery	6	5	[10]
2	(Hungary) T Babos (Mexico) M Zacarías	4	7	[5]
