= 2019 LTP Charleston Pro Tennis II – Doubles =

Doubles
- 2019 LTP Charleston Pro Tennis II

Final
- Champions: (Kazakhstan) Anna Danilina (United States) Ingrid Neel
- Runners-up: (Montenegro) Vladica Babić (United States) Caitlin Whoriskey
- Score: 6–1, 6–1

Events
| Singles | Doubles |
| ← 2018 · | LTP Charleston Pro Tennis | · 2021 → |

Sophie Chang and Alexandra Mueller were the defending champions, but lost in the semifinals to Vladica Babić and Caitlin Whoriskey.

Anna Danilina and Ingrid Neel, won the title, defeating Babić and Whoriskey in the final, 6–1, 6–1.

== Seeds ==
1. (Kazakhstan) Anna Danilina / (United States) Ingrid Neel (champions)
2. (United States) Sophie Chang / (United States) Alexandra Mueller (semifinals)
3. (United States) Emina Bektas / (United Kingdom) Tara Moore (first round)
4. (Montenegro) Vladica Babić / (United States) Caitlin Whoriskey (final)

== Draw ==
=== Key ===
- Q = Qualifier
- WC = Wild card
- LL = Lucky loser
- Alt = Alternate
- ITF = ITF entry
- PR = Protected ranking
- SR = Special ranking
- SE = Special exempt
- JE = Junior exempt
- JR = Junior Accelerator Programme entrant
- CO = College Accelerator Programme entrant
- NG = Next Gen Accelerator Program entrant
- w/o = Walkover
- r = Retired
- d = Defaulted

=== Draw ===
First round
1 | (Kazakhstan) A Danilina (United States) I Neel | 6^{3} | 6 | [10]
(United States) E Halbauer (Mexico) R Zarazúa | 7^{7} | 1 | [7]
(United States) C Dolehide (United States) E Navarro | 6 | 7^{7}
(Israel) D Khazaniuk (United States) A Parks | 1 | 6^{1}
3 | (United States) E Bektas (United Kingdom) T Moore | 4 | 5
(United States) K Stewart (Romania) G Talabă | 6 | 7
(United States) UM Arconada (United States) H Baptiste | 4 | 5
(Australia) O Tjandramulia (Mexico) M Zacarías | 6 | 7
(United States) Q Gleason (United States) G Min | 4 | 3
(Chile) B Gatica (Brazil) R Pereira | 6 | 6
WC | (United States) E Charney (United States) L Schneider | 0 | 1
4 | (Montenegro) V Babić (United States) C Whoriskey | 6 | 6
WC | (United States) R Brantmeier (United States) K Miller | 3 | 2
(United States) R McAdoo (Italy) G Sanesi | 6 | 6
WC | (United States) A Gretkowski (United States) W Pate | 3 | 2
2 | (United States) S Chang (United States) A Mueller | 6 | 6

Quarterfinals
1 | (Kazakhstan) A Danilina (United States) I Neel | 3 | 6 | [10]
(United States) C Dolehide (United States) E Navarro | 6 | 2 | [7]
(United States) K Stewart (Romania) G Talabă | 5 | 4
(Australia) O Tjandramulia (Mexico) M Zacarías | 7 | 6
(Chile) B Gatica (Brazil) R Pereira | 1 | 3
4 | (Montenegro) V Babić (United States) C Whoriskey | 6 | 6
(United States) R McAdoo (Italy) G Sanesi | 6 | 4 | [3]
2 | (United States) S Chang (United States) A Mueller | 3 | 6 | [10]

Semifinals
1 | (Kazakhstan) A Danilina (United States) I Neel | 3 | 6 | [11]
(Australia) O Tjandramulia (Mexico) M Zacarías | 6 | 3 | [9]
4 | (Montenegro) V Babić (United States) C Whoriskey | 1 | 6 | [10]
2 | (United States) S Chang (United States) A Mueller | 6 | 3 | [5]

Final
1 | (Kazakhstan) A Danilina (United States) I Neel | 6 | 6
4 | (Montenegro) V Babić (United States) C Whoriskey | 1 | 1
