= 2021 Monterrey Open =

Women's tennis tournament in Mexico

- Date: 15–21 March
- Edition: 13th
- Category: WTA 250
- Draw: 32S / 16D
- Prize money: $235,238
- Surface: Hard / outdoor
- Location: Monterrey, Mexico
- Venue: Club Sonoma

Champions

Singles
- (Canada) Leylah Fernandez

Doubles
- (United States) Caroline Dolehide / (United States) Asia Muhammad
- Monterrey Open

The 2021 Monterrey Open (also known as the Abierto GNP Seguros for sponsorship reasons) was a women's tennis tournament played on outdoor hard courts. It was the 13th edition of the Monterrey Open and a WTA 250 tournament on the 2021 WTA Tour. It took place at the Club Sonoma in Monterrey, Mexico, from 15 March to 21 March 2021. Unseeded Leylah Fernandez won the singles title.

== Finals ==
=== Singles ===
(Canada) Leylah Fernandez defeated (Switzerland) Viktorija Golubic, 6–1, 6–4

- It was Fernandez's only WTA singles title of the year and the 1st of her career.

=== Doubles ===
- (United States) Caroline Dolehide / (United States) Asia Muhammad defeated (United Kingdom) Heather Watson / (China) Saisai Zheng 6–2, 6–3

== Points and prize money ==
=== Point distribution ===
Event	W	F	SF	QF	Round of 16	Round of 32	Q	Q2	Q1
Singles	280	180	110	60	30	1	18	12	1
Doubles	280	180	110	60	1	—N/a	—N/a	—N/a	—N/a

=== Prize money ===
Event	W	F	SF	QF	Round of 16	Round of 32	Q2	Q1
Singles	$29,200	$16,398	$10,100	$5,800	$3,675	$2,675	$1,950	$1,270
Doubles*	$10,300	$6,000	$3,800	$2,300	$1,750	—N/a	—N/a	—N/a

_{*per team}

== Singles main draw entrants ==
=== Seeds ===
Country	Player	Ranking^{1}	Seed
USA	Sloane Stephens	44	1
ARG	Nadia Podoroska	46	2
CHN	Zheng Saisai	48	3
~~CZE~~	~~Marie Bouzková~~	~~50~~	~~4~~
GBR	Heather Watson	64	5
RUS	Anna Blinkova	70	6
ESP	Sara Sorribes Tormo	71	7
USA	Ann Li	72	8
JPN	Nao Hibino	79	9

- ^{1} Rankings as of 8 March 2021.

=== Other entrants ===
The following players received wildcards into the main draw:

- (United States) Caroline Dolehide
- (United States) CoCo Vandeweghe
- (Mexico) Renata Zarazúa

The following player received entry into the singles main draw using a protected ranking:

- (United Kingdom) Katie Boulter
- (Slovakia) Anna Karolína Schmiedlová

The following player received entry as a special exempt:

- (Canada) Eugenie Bouchard

The following players received entry from the qualifying draw:

- (Switzerland) Viktorija Golubic
- (Slovenia) Kaja Juvan
- (Russia) Anna Kalinskaya
- (Colombia) Camila Osorio
- (Egypt) Mayar Sherif
- (Ukraine) Lesia Tsurenko

The following players received entry as lucky losers:

- (United Kingdom) Harriet Dart
- (Slovakia) Kristína Kučová

=== Withdrawals ===
Before the tournament

- (Belarus) Victoria Azarenka → replaced by (Italy) Jasmine Paolini
- (Czech Republic) Marie Bouzková → replaced by (Slovakia) Kristína Kučová
- (United States) Coco Gauff → replaced by (Russia) Varvara Gracheva
- (Slovenia) Polona Hercog → replaced by (Serbia) Nina Stojanović
- (Tunisia) Ons Jabeur → replaced by (Slovakia) Anna Karolína Schmiedlová
- (United Kingdom) Johanna Konta → replaced by (Slovenia) Tamara Zidanšek
- (Montenegro) Danka Kovinić → replaced by (United Kingdom) Harriet Dart
- (Poland) Magda Linette → replaced by (Italy) Martina Trevisan
- (Australia) Ajla Tomljanović → replaced by (China) Zhu Lin

During the tournament

- (Slovenia) Kaja Juvan (Covid-19 illness)

== Doubles main draw entrants ==
=== Seeds ===
Country	Player	Country	Player	Rank^{1}	Seed
USA	Desirae Krawczyk	MEX	Giuliana Olmos	76	1
USA	Caroline Dolehide	USA	Asia Muhammad	82	2
NED	Arantxa Rus	SLO	Tamara Zidanšek	121	3
ESP	Lara Arruabarrena	AUS	Ellen Perez	135	4

- Rankings as of March 8, 2021.

=== Other entrants ===
The following pairs received wildcards into the doubles main draw:

- (Mexico) Fernanda Contreras / (Mexico) Marcela Zacarías
- (Colombia) Camila Osorio / (Mexico) Renata Zarazúa

=== Withdrawals ===
Before the tournament

- (Czech Republic) Marie Bouzková / (Spain) Sara Sorribes Tormo → replaced by (Poland) Paula Kania-Choduń / (Poland) Katarzyna Piter
- (Russia) Anna Kalinskaya / (Slovakia) Viktória Kužmová → replaced by (Belgium) Greet Minnen / (United States) Ingrid Neel

During the tournament

- (Russia) Anna Blinkova / (Argentina) Nadia Podoroska (right hip injury)

=== Retirements ===
- (Belgium) Greet Minnen / (United States) Ingrid Neel (gastrointestinal illness)
