= 2021 LTP Charleston Pro Tennis II – Singles =

Singles
- 2021 LTP Charleston Pro Tennis II

Final
- Champion: (Greece) Despina Papamichail
- Runner-up: (Brazil) Gabriela Cé
- Score: 1–6, 6–3, 6–3

Events
Singles	Doubles
← 2019 ·	LTP Charleston Pro Tennis	· 2022 →

Caroline Dolehide was the defending champion, having won the previous edition in 2019, however she chose to participate in qualifying for Wimbledon instead.

Despina Papamichail won the title, defeating Gabriela Cé in the final, 1–6, 6–3, 6–3.

== Seeds ==
1. (Switzerland) Conny Perrin (first round)
2. (Greece) Despina Papamichail (champion)
3. (United States) Hanna Chang (second round)
4. (United States) Alycia Parks (second round)
5. (Japan) Kyōka Okamura (first round)
6. (Brazil) Gabriela Cé (final)
7. (Mexico) Marcela Zacarías (first round)
8. (United States) Alexa Glatch (quarterfinals)

== Draw ==
=== Key ===
- Q = Qualifier
- WC = Wild card
- LL = Lucky loser
- Alt = Alternate
- SE = Special exempt
- PR = Protected ranking
- ITF = ITF entry
- JE = Junior exempt
- w/o = Walkover
- r = Retired
- d = Defaulted
- SR = Special ranking

=== Finals ===
Semifinals
(Georgia (country)) Sofia Shapatava	3	0
6	(Brazil) Gabriela Cé	6	6
(Mexico) Fernanda Contreras	2	2
2	(Greece) Despina Papamichail	6	6

Final
6	(Brazil) Gabriela Cé	6	3	3
2	(Greece) Despina Papamichail	1	6	6

=== Top half ===
First round
1	(Switzerland) C Perrin	4	6^{3}
Q	(United States) Q Gleason	6	7^{7}
(Georgia (country)) S Shapatava	6	5	6
(Japan) N Hanatani	4	7	1
PR	(China) S Xu	3	4
(United States) S Chang	6	6
Q	(United States) L Chirico	6	7
7	(Mexico) M Zacarías	1	5
3	(United States) H Chang	7^{7}	6
SE	(United States) P Stearns	6^{3}	4
(Mexico) AS Sánchez	6	4	7
(Argentina) ML Carlé	2	6	5
(United States) M Mateas	6	0	7^{13}
(United States) K Stewart	4	6	6^{11}
Q	(United States) M Sanchez	0	2
6	(Brazil) G Cé	6	6

Second round
Q	(United States) Q Gleason	6	6^{2}	2
(Georgia (country)) S Shapatava	0	7^{7}	6
(United States) S Chang	6	6
Q	(United States) L Chirico	2	2
3	(United States) H Chang	6	3	2
(Mexico) AS Sánchez	2	6	6
(United States) M Mateas	1	4
6	(Brazil) G Cé	6	6

Quarterfinals
(Georgia (country)) S Shapatava	2	6	6
(United States) S Chang	6	4	2
(Mexico) AS Sánchez	4	2
6	(Brazil) G Cé	6	6

Semifinals
(Georgia (country)) S Shapatava	3	0
6	(Brazil) G Cé	6	6

=== Bottom half ===
First round
5	(Japan) K Okamura	3	6^{9}
(Hungary) F Stollár	6	7^{11}
Q	(Bulgaria) G Topalova	4	2
WC	(United States) E Navarro	6	6
WC	(United States) E Kalieva	0	4
(Mexico) F Contreras	6	6
WC	(United States) E Yu	3	6	3
4	(United States) A Parks	6	3	6
8	(United States) A Glatch	6	2	7
Q	(Japan) E Sema	2	6	5
Q	(New Zealand) P Hourigan	6	6^{4}	1
Q	(United States) E Davis	4	7^{7}	6
WC	(United States) T Ng	3	0
Q	(United States) C Chavatipon	6	6
(Indonesia) A Sutjiadi	6	3	1
2	(Greece) D Papamichail	2	6	6

Second round
(Hungary) F Stollár	0^{r}
WC	(United States) E Navarro	5
(Mexico) F Contreras	6	6
4	(United States) A Parks	3	3
8	(United States) A Glatch	6	4	6
Q	(United States) E Davis	4	6	1
Q	(United States) C Chavatipon	3	3
2	(Greece) D Papamichail	6	6

Quarterfinals
WC	(United States) E Navarro	4	4
(Mexico) F Contreras	6	6
8	(United States) A Glatch	6	0	4
2	(Greece) D Papamichail	4	6	6

Semifinals
(Mexico) F Contreras	2	2
2	(Greece) D Papamichail	6	6
