= 2022 LTP Charleston Pro Tennis 2 =

Tennis tournament

- Date: 27 June–3 July 2022
- Edition: 7th
- Category: ITF Women's World Tennis Tour
- Prize money: $100,000
- Surface: Clay / Outdoor
- Location: Charleston, South Carolina, United States

Champions

Singles
- (Canada) Carol Zhao

Doubles
- (United States) Alycia Parks / (United States) Sachia Vickery
← 2021 ·	LTP Charleston Pro Tennis	· 2023 →

The 2022 LTP Charleston Pro Tennis 2 was a professional tennis tournament played on outdoor clay courts. It was the seventh edition of the tournament which was part of the 2022 ITF Women's World Tennis Tour. It took place in Charleston, South Carolina, United States between 27 June and 3 July 2022.

== Champions ==
=== Singles ===
- (Canada) Carol Zhao def. (Japan) Himeno Sakatsume, 3–6, 6–4, 6–4

=== Doubles ===
- (United States) Alycia Parks / (United States) Sachia Vickery def. (Hungary) Tímea Babos / (Mexico) Marcela Zacarías, 6–4, 5–7, [10–5]

== Singles main draw entrants ==
=== Seeds ===
Country	Player	Rank^{1}	Seed
USA	Alycia Parks	135	1
GRE	Despina Papamichail	147	2
CZE	Linda Fruhvirtová	175	3
USA	Caroline Dolehide	176	4
SUI	Joanne Züger	182	5
USA	Jamie Loeb	216	6
USA	Emma Navarro	240	7
MEX	Marcela Zacarías	241	8

- ^{1} Rankings are as of 20 June 2022.

=== Other entrants ===
The following players received wildcards into the singles main draw:

- (United States) Jessie Aney
- (United States) Dalayna Hewitt
- (Serbia) Katarina Jokić

The following player received entry using a protected ranking:

- (Colombia) Emiliana Arango

The following players received entry from the qualifying draw:

- (India) Riya Bhatia
- (United States) Maegan Manasse
- (United States) Rasheeda McAdoo
- (United States) Erica Oosterhout
- (United States) Christina Rosca
- (Japan) Himeno Sakatsume
- (United States) Chanelle Van Nguyen
- (Bolivia) Noelia Zeballos
