= 2021 LTP Charleston Pro Tennis II – Doubles =

Doubles
- 2021 LTP Charleston Pro Tennis II

Final
- Champions: (Hungary) Fanny Stollár (Indonesia) Aldila Sutjiadi
- Runners-up: (United States) Rasheeda McAdoo (United States) Peyton Stearns
- Score: 6–0, 6–4

Events
Singles	Doubles
← 2019 ·	LTP Charleston Pro Tennis	· 2022 →

Anna Danilina and Ingrid Neel were the defending champions, having won the previous edition in 2019, but both players chose not to participate.

Fanny Stollár and Aldila Sutjiadi won the title, defeating Rasheeda McAdoo and Peyton Stearns in the final, 6–0, 6–4.

== Seeds ==
1. (Hungary) Fanny Stollár / (Indonesia) Aldila Sutjiadi (champions)
2. (United States) Quinn Gleason / (United States) Maria Sanchez (first round)
3. (Chinese Taipei) Hsu Chieh-yu / (Japan) Erika Sema (first round)
4. (Japan) Kyōka Okamura / (Switzerland) Conny Perrin (quarterfinals)

== Draw ==
=== Key ===
- Q = Qualifier
- WC = Wild card
- LL = Lucky loser
- Alt = Alternate
- SE = Special exempt
- PR = Protected ranking
- ITF = ITF entry
- JE = Junior exempt
- w/o = Walkover
- r = Retired
- d = Defaulted
- SR = Special ranking

=== Draw ===
First round
1	(Hungary) F Stollár (Indonesia) A Sutjiadi	6	6
WC	(Serbia) K Jokić (Germany) J Tilbürger	1	4
(Mexico) V Rodríguez (Mexico) AS Sánchez	2	6	[7]
(United States) S Chang (United States) E Navarro	6	3	[10]
3	(Chinese Taipei) C-y Hsu (Japan) E Sema	7^{10}	3	[6]
(Mexico) F Contreras (Mexico) M Zacarías	6^{8}	6	[10]
Alt	(United States) E Davis (Japan) N Hanatani	6	7
WC	(United States) P Charney (United States) T Ng	4	5
(United States) A Parks (United States) A Zhu	1	4
(United States) R McAdoo (United States) P Stearns	6	6
(United States) A Zamarripa (United States) M Zamarripa	3	6	[6]
4	(Japan) K Okamura (Switzerland) C Perrin	6	0	[10]
WC	(United States) G Pielet (United States) K Stewart	6^{4}	5
(United States) D Ivanova (Bulgaria) G Topalova	7^{7}	7
(United States) M Mateas (Greece) D Papamichail	6	6
2	(United States) Q Gleason (United States) M Sanchez	3	4

Quarterfinals
1	(Hungary) F Stollár (Indonesia) A Sutjiadi	6	6
(United States) S Chang (United States) E Navarro	0	4
(Mexico) F Contreras (Mexico) M Zacarías	6	6
Alt	(United States) E Davis (Japan) N Hanatani	3	2
(United States) R McAdoo (United States) P Stearns	6	7
4	(Japan) K Okamura (Switzerland) C Perrin	3	5
(United States) D Ivanova (Bulgaria) G Topalova	2	6	[11]
(United States) M Mateas (Greece) D Papamichail	6	3	[9]

Semifinals
1	(Hungary) F Stollár (Indonesia) A Sutjiadi	6	6
(Mexico) F Contreras (Mexico) M Zacarías	2	2
(United States) R McAdoo (United States) P Stearns	6	6
(United States) D Ivanova (Bulgaria) G Topalova	3	2

Final
1	(Hungary) F Stollár (Indonesia) A Sutjiadi	6	6
(United States) R McAdoo (United States) P Stearns	0	4
