= 2023 LTP Charleston Pro Tennis 2 =

Tennis tournament

- Date: 6–12 November 2023
- Edition: 8th
- Category: ITF Women's World Tennis Tour
- Prize money: $100,000
- Surface: Clay / Outdoor
- Location: Charleston, South Carolina, United States

Champions

Singles
- (United States) Emma Navarro

Doubles
- (United States) Hailey Baptiste / (United States) Whitney Osuigwe
| ← 2022 · | LTP Charleston Pro Tennis | · 2024 → |

The 2022 LTP Charleston Pro Tennis 2 is a professional tennis tournament played on outdoor clay courts. It is the eighth edition of the tournament which was part of the 2023 ITF Women's World Tennis Tour. It took place in Charleston, South Carolina, United States between 6 and 12 November 2023.

== Champions ==
=== Singles ===
- (United States) Emma Navarro def. (Hungary) Panna Udvardy, 6–1, 6–1

=== Doubles ===
- (United States) Hailey Baptiste / (United States) Whitney Osuigwe def. (Uzbekistan) Nigina Abduraimova / (France) Carole Monnet, 6–4, 3–6, [13–11]

== Singles main draw entrants ==
=== Seeds ===
| Country | Player | Rank^{1} | Seed |
|---|---|---|---|
| USA | Emma Navarro | 42 | 1 |
| USA | Alycia Parks | 54 | 2 |
| HUN | Panna Udvardy | 123 | 3 |
| USA | Hailey Baptiste | 136 | 4 |
| USA | Elizabeth Mandlik | 138 | 5 |
| USA | Sachia Vickery | 145 | 6 |
| ARG | María Lourdes Carlé | 146 | 7 |
| USA | Ann Li | 156 | 8 |

- ^{1} Rankings are as of 30 October 2023.

=== Other entrants ===
The following players received wildcards into the singles main draw:

- (United States) Chloe Beck
- (United States) Ellie Douglas
- (United States) Allie Kiick
- (United States) Elizabeth Mandlik

The following players received entry from the qualifying draw:

- (United States) DJ Bennett
- (United States) Alexis Blokhina
- (United States) Victoria Hu
- Maria Kozyreva
- (United States) Ashley Lahey
- (United States) Varvara Lepchenko
- (United States) Rasheeda McAdoo
- (India) Sahaja Yamalapalli
