= 2021 Monterrey Open – Doubles =

Doubles
- 2021 Monterrey Open

Final
- Champions: (United States) Caroline Dolehide (United States) Asia Muhammad
- Runners-up: (United Kingdom) Heather Watson (China) Zheng Saisai
- Score: 6–2, 6–3

Details
- Draw: 16
- Seeds: 4

Events
Singles	Doubles
← 2020 ·	Monterrey Open	· 2022 →

Kateryna Bondarenko and Sharon Fichman were the defending champions but chose not to participate.

Caroline Dolehide and Asia Muhammad won the title, defeating Heather Watson and Zheng Saisai in the final, 6–2, 6–3.

== Seeds ==
1. (United States) Desirae Krawczyk / (Mexico) Giuliana Olmos (quarterfinals)
2. (United States) Caroline Dolehide / (United States) Asia Muhammad (champions)
3. (Netherlands) Arantxa Rus / (Slovenia) Tamara Zidanšek (first round)
4. (Spain) Lara Arruabarrena / (Australia) Ellen Perez (semifinals)

== Draw ==
=== Key ===
- Q = Qualifier
- WC = Wild card
- LL = Lucky loser
- Alt = Alternate
- SE = Special exempt
- PR = Protected ranking
- ITF = ITF entry
- JE = Junior exempt
- w/o = Walkover
- r = Retired
- d = Defaulted
- SR = Special ranking

=== Draw ===
First round
1	(United States) D Krawczyk (Mexico) G Olmos	6	6
(United States) M Sanchez (Hungary) F Stollár	3	2
(Russia) V Gracheva (Slovenia) K Juvan	6	1	[7]
(United Kingdom) H Watson (China) S Zheng	2	6	[10]
3	(Netherlands) A Rus (Slovenia) T Zidanšek	2	2
(Belgium) G Minnen (United States) I Neel	6	6
(Slovenia) D Jakupović (India) A Raina	1	4
(Russia) A Blinkova (Argentina) N Podoroska	6	6
(Poland) P Kania-Choduń (Poland) K Piter	7	7
(Japan) N Hibino (Japan) M Kato	5	5
WC	(Colombia) C Osorio (Mexico) R Zarazúa	2	6	[5]
4	(Spain) L Arruabarrena (Australia) E Perez	6	3	[10]
(Romania) M Buzărnescu (Germany) A-L Friedsam	4	7	[7]
(Slovakia) V Kužmová (Slovakia) AK Schmiedlová	6	5	[10]
WC	(Mexico) F Contreras (Mexico) M Zacarías	1	6^{3}
2	(United States) C Dolehide (United States) A Muhammad	6	7^{7}

Quarterfinals
1	(United States) D Krawczyk (Mexico) G Olmos	6	3	[5]
(United Kingdom) H Watson (China) S Zheng	1	6	[10]
(Belgium) G Minnen (United States) I Neel	7	4^{r}
(Russia) A Blinkova (Argentina) N Podoroska	5	1
(Poland) P Kania-Choduń (Poland) K Piter	6^{4}	4
4	(Spain) L Arruabarrena (Australia) E Perez	7^{7}	6
(Slovakia) V Kužmová (Slovakia) AK Schmiedlová	7^{7}	4	[6]
2	(United States) C Dolehide (United States) A Muhammad	6^{2}	6	[10]

Semifinals
(United Kingdom) H Watson (China) S Zheng	w/o
(Russia) A Blinkova (Argentina) N Podoroska
4	(Spain) L Arruabarrena (Australia) E Perez	1	6	[10]
2	(United States) C Dolehide (United States) A Muhammad	6	3	[12]

Final
(United Kingdom) H Watson (China) S Zheng	2	3
2	(United States) C Dolehide (United States) A Muhammad	6	6
