= 2019 LTP Charleston Pro Tennis II – Singles =

Singles
- 2019 LTP Charleston Pro Tennis II

Final
- Champion: (United States) Caroline Dolehide
- Runner-up: (United States) Grace Min
- Score: 6–2, 6–7^{(5–7)}, 6–0

Events
Singles	Doubles
← 2018 ·	LTP Charleston Pro Tennis	· 2021 →

Gabriela Talabă was the defending champion, but lost in the first round to Alexa Glatch.

Caroline Dolehide won the title, defeating Grace Min in the final, 6–2, 6–7^{(5–7)}, 6–0.

== Seeds ==
1. (United States) Usue Maitane Arconada (second round)
2. (United States) Caroline Dolehide (champion)
3. (Colombia) Camila Osorio (semifinals, retired)
4. (United States) Hailey Baptiste (second round)
5. (Romania) Gabriela Talabă (first round)
6. (Israel) Deniz Khazaniuk (first round)
7. (Russia) Marina Melnikova (quarterfinals)
8. (Japan) Mari Osaka (second round)

== Draw ==
=== Key ===
- Q = Qualifier
- WC = Wild card
- LL = Lucky loser
- Alt = Alternate
- ITF = ITF entry
- PR = Protected ranking
- SR = Special ranking
- SE = Special exempt
- JE = Junior exempt
- JR = Junior Accelerator Programme entrant
- CO = College Accelerator Programme entrant
- NG = Next Gen Accelerator Program entrant
- w/o = Walkover
- r = Retired
- d = Defaulted

=== Finals ===
Semifinals
(United States) Elizabeth Halbauer	1	6	5
(United States) Grace Min	6	1	7
3	(Colombia) Camila Osorio	1	3^{r}
2	(United States) Caroline Dolehide	6	4

Final
(United States) Grace Min	2	7^{7}	0
2	(United States) Caroline Dolehide	6	6^{5}	6

=== Top half ===
First round
1	(United States) UM Arconada	1	6	7^{7}
(United States) Q Gleason	6	4	6^{4}
(United States) E Halbauer	6	6
WC	(United States) K Miller	2	3
WC	(United States) E Navarro	6^{1}	1
LL	(United States) M Mateas	7^{7}	6
(China) H Guo	4	1
8	(Japan) M Osaka	6	6
4	(United States) H Baptiste	6	6
(United States) S Chang	4	3
(United States) G Min	6	7
Q	(Australia) O Tjandramulia	0	5
Q	(Belarus) S Talbi	6	7
Q	(United States) A Kratzer	3	5
(Mexico) R Zarazúa	7^{9}	6
6	(Israel) D Khazaniuk	6^{7}	4

Second round
1	(United States) UM Arconada	4	5
(United States) E Halbauer	6	7
LL	(United States) M Mateas	6	7^{7}
8	(Japan) M Osaka	1	6^{4}
4	(United States) H Baptiste	3	6	5
(United States) G Min	6	2	7
Q	(Belarus) S Talbi	7^{7}	6^{5}	0
(Mexico) R Zarazúa	6^{4}	7^{7}	6

Quarterfinals
(United States) E Halbauer	6	6
LL	(United States) M Mateas	4	3
(United States) G Min	6	6
(Mexico) R Zarazúa	3	4

Semifinals
(United States) E Halbauer	1	6	5
(United States) G Min	6	1	7

=== Bottom half ===
First round
5	(Romania) G Talabă	5	4
Q	(United States) A Glatch	7	6
(Kazakhstan) A Danilina	3	6	6
(United States) E Bektas	6	2	1
WC	(United States) R Brantmeier	6	1	4
WC	(United States) E Mandlik	4	6	6
Q	(Chile) B Gatica	4	2
3	(Colombia) C Osorio	6	6
7	(Russia) M Melnikova	6	6
Q	(Netherlands) S Lamens	3	4
(Italy) G Sanesi	2	6	7
Q	(United Kingdom) T Moore	6	3	5
Q	(France) M Partaud	6	6
(Mexico) M Zacarías	3	3
(Italy) B Turati	2	0
2	(United States) C Dolehide	6	6

Second round
Q	(United States) A Glatch	6	5	2
(Kazakhstan) A Danilina	3	7	6
WC	(United States) E Mandlik	4	1
3	(Colombia) C Osorio	6	6
7	(Russia) M Melnikova	6	6
(Italy) G Sanesi	1	3
Q	(France) M Partaud	2	0
2	(United States) C Dolehide	6	6

Quarterfinals
(Kazakhstan) A Danilina	7^{7}	4	5
3	(Colombia) C Osorio	6^{3}	6	7
7	(Russia) M Melnikova	2	3
2	(United States) C Dolehide	6	6

Semifinals
3	(Colombia) C Osorio	1	3^{r}
2	(United States) C Dolehide	6	4
