= 2021 Monterrey Open – Singles =

Singles
- 2021 Monterrey Open

Final
- Champion: (Canada) Leylah Fernandez
- Runner-up: (Switzerland) Viktorija Golubic
- Score: 6–1, 6–4

Details
- Draw: 32
- Seeds: 8

Events
Singles	Doubles
- Monterrey Open

Unseeded Leylah Fernandez defeated Viktorija Golubic in the final, 6–1, 6–4 to win the singles tennis title at the 2021 Monterrey Open. Fernandez did not drop a set en route to her first WTA Tour singles title.

Elina Svitolina was the reigning champion, but decided not to participate.

== Seeds ==
1. (United States) Sloane Stephens (first round)
2. (Argentina) Nadia Podoroska (first round)
3. (China) Zheng Saisai (quarterfinals)
4. (Czech Republic) Marie Bouzková (withdrew)
5. (United Kingdom) Heather Watson (first round)
6. (Russia) Anna Blinkova (first round)
7. (Spain) Sara Sorribes Tormo (semifinals)
8. (United States) Ann Li (semifinals)
9. (Japan) Nao Hibino (first round)

== Draw ==
Key

- Q = Qualifier
- WC = Wild card
- LL = Lucky loser
- Alt = Alternate
- ITF = ITF entry
- PR = Protected ranking
- SR = Special ranking
- SE = Special exempt
- JE = Junior exempt
- JR = Junior Accelerator Programme entrant
- CO = College Accelerator Programme entrant
- NG = Next Gen Accelerator Program entrant
- w/o = Walkover
- r = Retired
- d = Defaulted

=== Finals ===
Semifinals
(Canada) Leylah Fernandez	7	7
7	(Spain) Sara Sorribes Tormo	5	5
8	(United States) Ann Li	2	4
Q	(Switzerland) Viktorija Golubic	6	6

Final
(Canada) Leylah Fernandez	6	6
Q	(Switzerland) Viktorija Golubic	1	4

=== Top half ===
First round
1	(United States) S Stephens	2	2
LL	(Slovakia) K Kučová	6	6
WC	(United States) C Vandeweghe	3	2
(Canada) LA Fernandez	6	6
WC	(United States) C Dolehide	3	1
(Slovakia) V Kužmová	6	6
LL	(United Kingdom) H Dart	6	7^{7}
5	(United Kingdom) H Watson	4	6^{1}
9	(Japan) N Hibino	6	2	3
(Italy) J Paolini	3	6	6
PR	(Slovakia) AK Schmiedlová	6	6
PR	(United Kingdom) K Boulter	4	0
Q	(Slovenia) K Juvan	6	6
Q	(Colombia) C Osorio	4	4
Q	(Ukraine) L Tsurenko	7	2	4
7	(Spain) S Sorribes Tormo	5	6	6

Second round
LL	(Slovakia) K Kučová	1	4
(Canada) LA Fernandez	6	6
(Slovakia) V Kužmová	6	6
LL	(United Kingdom) H Dart	4	3
(Italy) J Paolini	6	2	2
PR	(Slovakia) AK Schmiedlová	2	6	6
Q	(Slovenia) K Juvan
7	(Spain) S Sorribes Tormo	w/o

Quarterfinals
(Canada) LA Fernandez	7	6
(Slovakia) V Kužmová	5	3
PR	(Slovakia) AK Schmiedlová	3	5
7	(Spain) S Sorribes Tormo	6	7

Semifinals
(Canada) LA Fernandez	7	7
7	(Spain) S Sorribes Tormo	5	5

=== Bottom half ===
First round
8	(United States) A Li	6	7
(Netherlands) A Rus	3	5
WC	(Mexico) R Zarazúa	6^{8}	3
(Slovenia) T Zidanšek	7^{10}	6
(China) L Zhu	7	7^{7}
SE	(Canada) E Bouchard	5	6^{3}
(Russia) V Gracheva	3	5
3	(China) S Zheng	6	7
6	(Russia) A Blinkova	4	4
Q	(Switzerland) V Golubic	6	6
Q	(Egypt) M Sherif	6	2	3
(United States) L Davis	1	6	6
(Italy) M Trevisan	3	2
(Serbia) N Stojanović	6	6
Q	(Russia) A Kalinskaya	6	6
2	(Argentina) N Podoroska	4	4

Second round
8	(United States) A Li	6	6
(Slovenia) T Zidanšek	4	3
(China) L Zhu	1	2
3	(China) S Zheng	6	6
Q	(Switzerland) V Golubic	6	6
(United States) L Davis	3	1
(Serbia) N Stojanović	4	3
Q	(Russia) A Kalinskaya	6	6

Quarterfinals
8	(United States) A Li	7	6
3	(China) S Zheng	5	1
Q	(Switzerland) V Golubic	6	6
Q	(Russia) A Kalinskaya	2	4

Semifinals
8	(United States) A Li	2	4
Q	(Switzerland) V Golubic	6	6

== Qualifying ==
=== Seeds ===
1. (Slovenia) Kaja Juvan (qualified)
2. (Switzerland) Viktorija Golubic (qualified)
3. (Spain) Aliona Bolsova (first round)
4. (Italy) Sara Errani (first round)
5. (Belgium) Greet Minnen (withdrew)
6. (United States) Kristie Ahn (first round)
7. (Egypt) Mayar Sherif (qualified)
8. (Germany) Anna-Lena Friedsam (first round)
9. (Poland) Katarzyna Kawa (first round)
10. (Russia) Anna Kalinskaya (qualified)
11. (China) Wang Xiyu (first round)
12. (Romania) Irina Bara (first round)

=== Qualifiers ===
1. (Slovenia) Kaja Juvan
2. (Switzerland) Viktorija Golubic
3. (Ukraine) Lesia Tsurenko
4. (Colombia) Camila Osorio
5. (Russia) Anna Kalinskaya
6. (Egypt) Mayar Sherif

=== Lucky losers ===
1. (Slovakia) Kristína Kučová
2. (United Kingdom) Harriet Dart

=== Qualifying draw ===
==== First qualifier ====
First round
1	(Slovenia) Kaja Juvan	6	4	6
(Belarus) Olga Govortsova	2	6	2
Alt	(Japan) Kurumi Nara	6	6
12	(Romania) Irina Bara	1	0

Qualifying competition
1	(Slovenia) Kaja Juvan	6	6
Alt	(Japan) Kurumi Nara	1	1

==== Second qualifier ====
First round
2	(Switzerland) Viktorija Golubic	6	6
WC	(Mexico) Ana Sofía Sánchez	0	1
(Switzerland) Leonie Küng	6	6
8	(Germany) Anna-Lena Friedsam	1	2

Qualifying competition
2	(Switzerland) Viktorija Golubic	6	7^{7}
(Switzerland) Leonie Küng	3	6^{3}

==== Third qualifier ====
First round
3	(Spain) Aliona Bolsova	3	5
(Slovakia) Kristína Kučová	6	7
(Ukraine) Lesia Tsurenko	6	6
9	(Poland) Katarzyna Kawa	4	3

Qualifying competition
(Slovakia) Kristína Kučová	3	2
(Ukraine) Lesia Tsurenko	6	6

==== Fourth qualifier ====
First round
4	(Italy) Sara Errani	0	2
(United Kingdom) Harriet Dart	6	6
WC	(Colombia) Camila Osorio	7^{7}	4	6
11	(China) Wang Xiyu	6^{2}	6	2

Qualifying competition
(United Kingdom) Harriet Dart	4	5
WC	(Colombia) Camila Osorio	6	7

==== Fifth qualifier ====
First round
Alt	(Spain) Lara Arruabarrena	6	6
(Italy) Elisabetta Cocciaretto	2	4
WC	(Mexico) Fernanda Contreras	2	1
10	(Russia) Anna Kalinskaya	6	6

Qualifying competition
Alt	(Spain) Lara Arruabarrena	4	3
10	(Russia) Anna Kalinskaya	6	6

==== Sixth qualifier ====
First round
6	(United States) Kristie Ahn	4	6^{5}
(United States) Usue Maitane Arconada	6	7^{7}
WC	(Mexico) Marcela Zacarías	3	6^{0}
7	(Egypt) Mayar Sherif	6	7^{7}

Qualifying competition
(United States) Usue Maitane Arconada	3	4
7	(Egypt) Mayar Sherif	6	6
