= 2023 LTP Charleston Pro Tennis 2 – Singles =

Singles
- 2023 LTP Charleston Pro Tennis 2

Final
- Champion: (United States) Emma Navarro
- Runner-up: (Hungary) Panna Udvardy
- Score: 6–1, 6–1

Events
Singles	Doubles
← 2022 ·	LTP Charleston Pro Tennis	· 2024 →

Carol Zhao is the defending champion but chose not to participate.

Emma Navarro won the title, defeating Panna Udvardy in the final, 6–1, 6–1.

== Seeds ==
1. (United States) Emma Navarro (champion)
2. (United States) Alycia Parks (second round)
3. (Hungary) Panna Udvardy (final)
4. (United States) Hailey Baptiste (semifinals)
5. (United States) Elizabeth Mandlik (quarterfinals)
6. (United States) Sachia Vickery (quarterfinals, withdrew)
7. (Argentina) María Lourdes Carlé (second round)
8. (United States) Ann Li (quarterfinals)

== Draw ==
=== Key ===
- Q = Qualifier
- WC = Wild card
- LL = Lucky loser
- Alt = Alternate
- SE = Special exempt
- PR = Protected ranking
- ITF = ITF entry
- JE = Junior exempt
- w/o = Walkover
- r = Retired
- d = Defaulted
- SR = Special ranking

=== Finals ===
Semifinals
1	(United States) Emma Navarro	6	6
4	(United States) Hailey Baptiste	2	1
3	(Hungary) Panna Udvardy	6	7^{7}
(Mexico) Renata Zarazúa	2	6^{5}

Final
1	(United States) Emma Navarro	6	6
3	(Hungary) Panna Udvardy	1	1

=== Top half ===
First round
1	(United States) E Navarro	6	6
(Switzerland) C Perrin	0	0
(United States) G Min	7^{8}	6
WC	(United States) A Kiick	6^{6}	3
(Andorra) V Jiménez Kasintseva	6	2	3
WC	(United States) C Beck	4	6	6
Q	(United States) A Lahey	2	4
6	(United States) S Vickery	6	6
4	(United States) H Baptiste	7^{7}	1	6
Q	M Kozyreva	6^{2}	6	4
Q	(United States) A Blokhina	5	3
Q	(United States) R McAdoo	7	6
Q	(India) S Yamalapalli	6	6
Q	(United States) DJ Bennett	4	0
WC	(United States) E Douglas	4	6^{5}
5/WC	(United States) E Mandlik	6	7^{7}

Second round
1	(United States) E Navarro	6	6
(United States) G Min	2	0
WC	(United States) C Beck	3	5
6	(United States) S Vickery	6	7
4	(United States) H Baptiste	6	2	6
Q	(United States) R McAdoo	2	6	4
Q	(India) S Yamalapalli	3	0
5/WC	(United States) E Mandlik	6	6

Quarterfinals
1	(United States) E Navarro	w/o
6	(United States) S Vickery
4	(United States) H Baptiste	6	4	6
5/WC	(United States) E Mandlik	2	6	1

Semifinals
1	(United States) E Navarro	6	6
4	(United States) H Baptiste	2	1

=== Bottom half ===
First round
7	(Argentina) ML Carlé	6	6
Q	(United States) V Hu	4	3
Q	(United States) V Lepchenko	6	4
(United States) L Chirico	2	1^{r}
(Uzbekistan) N Abduraimova	7^{7}	6^{0}	5
(United States) M Kessler	6^{3}	7^{7}	7
(United States) M Jones	4	3
3	(Hungary) P Udvardy	6	6
8	(United States) A Li	7	6
(Ukraine) Y Starodubtseva	5	4
(United States) S Chang	6^{2}	7^{7}	7^{9}
(United States) M Mateas	7^{7}	6^{5}	6^{7}
(France) C Monnet	6^{7}	0
(Mexico) R Zarazúa	7^{9}	6
(France) F Ferro	0	3
2	(United States) A Parks	6	6

Second round
7	(Argentina) ML Carlé	6	4	2
Q	(United States) V Lepchenko	1	6	6
(United States) M Kessler	5	4
3	(Hungary) P Udvardy	7	6
8	(United States) A Li	3	6	6
(United States) S Chang	6	4	3
(Mexico) R Zarazúa	0	6	6
2	(United States) A Parks	6	4	1

Quarterfinals
Q	(United States) V Lepchenko	3	6	5
3	(Hungary) P Udvardy	6	2	7
8	(United States) A Li	4	1
(Mexico) R Zarazúa	6	6

Semifinals
3	(Hungary) P Udvardy	6	7^{7}
(Mexico) R Zarazúa	2	6^{5}
