= 2019 LTP Charleston Pro Tennis II =

- Date: 30 September–6 October 2019
- Edition: 5th
- Category: ITF Women's World Tennis Tour
- Prize money: $60,000
- Surface: Clay
- Location: Charleston, South Carolina, United States

Champions

Singles
- (United States) Caroline Dolehide

Doubles
- (Kazakhstan) Anna Danilina / (United States) Ingrid Neel
← 2018 ·	LTP Charleston Pro Tennis	· 2021 →

The 2019 LTP Charleston Pro Tennis II was a professional tennis tournament played on outdoor clay courts. It was the fifth edition of the tournament which was part of the 2019 ITF Women's World Tennis Tour. It took place in Charleston, South Carolina, United States between 30 September and 6 October 2019.

== Singles main-draw entrants ==
=== Seeds ===
Country	Player	Rank^{1}	Seed
USA	Usue Maitane Arconada	145	1
USA	Caroline Dolehide	203	2
COL	Camila Osorio	230	3
USA	Hailey Baptiste	261	4
ROU	Gabriela Talabă	272	5
ISR	Deniz Khazaniuk	276	6
RUS	Marina Melnikova	288	7
JPN	Mari Osaka	308	8

- ^{1} Rankings are as of 23 September 2019.

=== Other entrants ===
The following players received wildcards into the singles main draw:

- (United States) Reese Brantmeier
- (United States) Elizabeth Mandlik
- (United States) Karina Miller
- (United States) Emma Navarro

The following players received entry from the qualifying draw:

- (Chile) Bárbara Gatica
- (United States) Alexa Glatch
- (United States) Ashley Kratzer
- (Netherlands) Suzan Lamens
- (United Kingdom) Tara Moore
- (France) Marine Partaud
- (Belarus) Shalimar Talbi
- (Australia) Olivia Tjandramulia

The following players received entry as a lucky loser:

- (United States) Maria Mateas

== Champions ==
=== Singles ===
- (United States) Caroline Dolehide def. (United States) Grace Min, 6–2, 6–7^{(5–7)}, 6–0

=== Doubles ===
- (Kazakhstan) Anna Danilina / (United States) Ingrid Neel def. (Montenegro) Vladica Babić / (United States) Caitlin Whoriskey, 6–1, 6–1
