= 2023 LTP Charleston Pro Tennis 2 – Doubles =

Doubles
- 2023 LTP Charleston Pro Tennis 2

Final
- Champions: (United States) Hailey Baptiste (United States) Whitney Osuigwe
- Runners-up: (Uzbekistan) Nigina Abduraimova (France) Carole Monnet
- Score: 6–4, 3–6, [13–11]

Events
Singles	Doubles
← 2022 ·	LTP Charleston Pro Tennis	· 2024 →

Alycia Parks and Sachia Vickery were the defending champions, but Parks chose to participate only in the singles competition. Vickery played alongside Alana Smith but withdrew from the tournament before their quarterfinals match against Julia Lohoff and Conny Perrin.

Hailey Baptiste and Whitney Osuigwe won the title, defeating Nigina Abduraimova and Carole Monnet in the final, 6–4, 3–6, [13–11].

== Seeds ==
1. (United States) Asia Muhammad / (United States) Sabrina Santamaria (quarterfinals)
2. (United States) Sophie Chang / Maria Kozyreva (quarterfinals)
3. (Germany) Julia Lohoff / (Switzerland) Conny Perrin (semifinals)
4. (United States) Makenna Jones / (Ukraine) Yulia Starodubtseva (quarterfinals)

== Draw ==
=== Key ===
- Q = Qualifier
- WC = Wild card
- LL = Lucky loser
- Alt = Alternate
- SE = Special exempt
- PR = Protected ranking
- ITF = ITF entry
- JE = Junior exempt
- w/o = Walkover
- r = Retired
- d = Defaulted
- SR = Special ranking

=== Draw ===
First round
1	(United States) A Muhammad (United States) S Santamaria	6	7^{7}
(United States) J Daniel (United States) R McAdoo	2	6^{5}
(United States) C Beck (United States) A Markham	6	6
WC	(United States) N Kavarana (United States) C Sawyer	0	3
4	(United States) M Jones (Ukraine) Y Starodubtseva	6	6
(India) S Yamalapalli; A Zyryanova	3	0
(Andorra) V Jiménez Kasintseva (Mexico) R Zarazúa	3	4
(United States) H Baptiste (United States) W Osuigwe	6	6
(United States) A Smith (United States) S Vickery	6	6
WC	(United States) DJ Bennett (United States) E Douglas	3	4
(United States) J Failla (United States) V Hu	2	4
3	(Germany) J Lohoff (Switzerland) C Perrin	6	6
(United States) A Blokhina (United States) K Hui
(Uzbekistan) N Abduraimova (France) C Monnet	w/o
(United States) M Mateas (United States) A Rogers	3	4
2	(United States) S Chang; M Kozyreva	6	6

Quarterfinals
1	(United States) A Muhammad (United States) S Santamaria	3	5
(United States) C Beck (United States) A Markham	6	7
4	(United States) M Jones (Ukraine) Y Starodubtseva	5	2
(United States) H Baptiste (United States) W Osuigwe	7	6
(United States) A Smith (United States) S Vickery
3	(Germany) J Lohoff (Switzerland) C Perrin	w/o
(Uzbekistan) N Abduraimova (France) C Monnet	6	7^{7}
2	(United States) S Chang; M Kozyreva	3	6^{4}

Semifinals
(United States) C Beck (United States) A Markham	2	2
(United States) H Baptiste (United States) W Osuigwe	6	6
3	(Germany) J Lohoff (Switzerland) C Perrin	0	3
(Uzbekistan) N Abduraimova (France) C Monnet	6	6

Final
(United States) H Baptiste (United States) W Osuigwe	6	3	[13]
(Uzbekistan) N Abduraimova (France) C Monnet	4	6	[11]
