= Leylah Fernandez career statistics =

Career statistics list of tennis player Leylah Fernandez

Career finals
Discipline	Type	Won	Lost	Total
Singles	Grand Slam	–	1	1
Singles	WTA Finals	–	–	0
Singles	WTA 1000	–	–	0
Singles	WTA 500	2	2	4
Singles	WTA 250	4	1	5
Singles	Olympics	–	–	0
Singles	Total	6	4	10
Doubles	Grand Slam	–	1	1
Doubles	WTA Finals	–	–	0
Doubles	WTA 1000	–	2	2
Doubles	WTA 500	–	–	0
Doubles	WTA 250	–	2	2
Doubles	Olympics	–	–	0
Doubles	Total	0	5	5

This is a list of career statistics of Canadian tennis professional Leylah Fernandez.

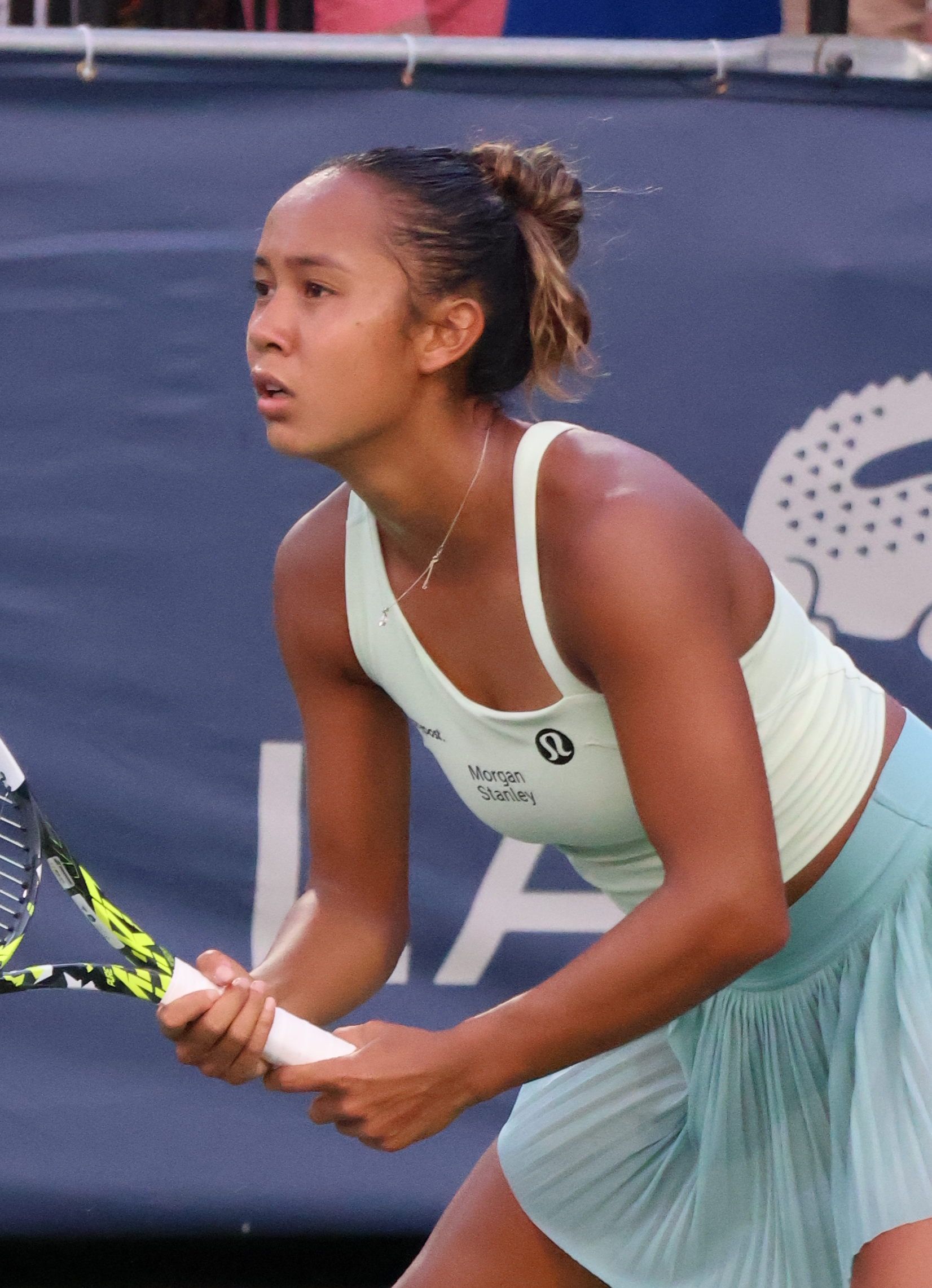
Fernandez at the 2023 Washington Open.

== Performance timelines ==
Key
W	F	SF	QF	#R	RR	Q#	P#	DNQ	A	Z#	PO	G	S	B	NMS	NTI	P	NH

(W) winner; (F) finalist; (SF) semifinalist; (QF) quarterfinalist; (#R) rounds 4, 3, 2, 1; (RR) round-robin stage; (Q#) qualification round; (P#) preliminary round; (DNQ) did not qualify; (A) absent; (Z#) Davis/Fed Cup Zonal Group (with number indication) or (PO) play-off; (G) gold, (S) silver or (B) bronze Olympic/Paralympic medal; (NMS) not a Masters tournament; (NTI) not a Tier I tournament; (P) postponed; (NH) not held; (SR) strike rate (events won / competed); (W–L) win–loss record.
To avoid confusion and double counting, these charts are updated at the conclusion of a tournament or when the player's participation has ended.

Only main-draw results in WTA Tour, Grand Slam tournaments, Billie Jean King Cup, United Cup, Hopman Cup and Olympic Games are included in win–loss records.

=== Singles ===
Current through the 2026 French Open.

Tournament	2018	2019	2020	2021	2022	2023	2024	2025	2026	SR	W–L	Win %
Grand Slam tournaments
Australian Open	A	A	1R	1R	1R	2R	2R	3R	1R	0 / 7	4–7	36%
French Open	A	A	3R	2R	QF	2R	3R	1R	1R	0 / 7	10–7	59%
Wimbledon	A	A	NH	1R	A	2R	2R	2R	1R	0 / 5	3–5	38%
US Open	A	A	2R	F	2R	1R	1R	3R	3R	0 / 7	12–7	63%
Win–Loss	0–0	0–0	3–3	7–4	5–3	3–4	4–4	5–4	2–4	0 / 26	29–26	53%
National representation
Summer Olympics	Not Held			2R	Not Held		3R	Not Held		0 / 2	3–2	60%
Billie Jean King Cup (Note: Formerly known as Fed Cup until 2020.)	A	PO	RR (Note: Edition is split into the two years due to COVID-19.)		RR	W	QF	A		1 / 4	12–4	75%
WTA 1000 tournaments
Qatar Open	A	NTI	A	NTI	A	NTI	QF	3R	1R	0 / 3	5–3	63%
Dubai Championships	NTI	A	NTI	A	NTI	2R	2R	1R	2R	0 / 4	3–4	43%
Indian Wells Open	A	A	NH	4R	4R	3R	2R	2R	2R	0 / 6	5–6	45%
Miami Open	A	A	NH	Q1	2R	2R	3R	3R	3R	0 / 5	4–5	44%
Madrid Open	A	A	NH	Q1	2R	1R	3R	2R	QF	0 / 5	5–5	50%
Italian Open	A	A	Q1	Q1	2R	1R	2R	3R	2R	0 / 5	2–5	29%
Canadian Open	Q2	1R	NH	1R	2R	3R	2R	1R	4R	0 / 7	6–7	46%
Cincinnati Open	A	A	1R	1R	1R	Q1	QF	2R	2R	0 / 6	3–6	33%
Guadalajara Open	Not Held				1R	QF	Not Tier I			0 / 2	3–2	60%
China Open	A	A	Not Held			Q1	2R	3R		0 / 2	1–2	33%
Wuhan Open	A	A	Not Held				3R	1R		0 / 2	2–2	50%
Win–Loss	0–0	0–1	0–1	2–3	5–7	8–7	12–10	5–10	7–8	0 / 47	39–47	45%
Career statistics
	2018	2019	2020	2021	2022	2023	2024	2025	2026	SR	W–L	Win%
Tournaments	1	2	7	15	14	21	23	26	23	Career total: 132		
Titles	0	0	0	1	1	1	0	2	1	Career total: 6		
Finals	0	0	1	2	1	1	1	2	3	Career total: 11		
Hard win–loss	1–1	0–2	9–7	19–9	13–10	28–13	20–17	29–17	22–16	6 / 94	141–92	61%
Clay win–loss	0–0	0–1	2–1	1–2	6–4	3–5	4–5	1–4	8–7	0 / 28	25–29	46%
Grass win–loss	0–0	0–0	0–0	3–3	0–0	2–2	7–3	4–4	1–4	0 / 16	17–16	52%
Overall win–loss	1–1	0–3	11–8	23–14	19–14	33–20	31–25	34–25	31–27	5 / 137	183–137	57%
Win %	50%	0%	58%	62%	58%	62%	55%	58%	53%	Career total: 57.19%		
Year-end ranking (Note: 2017: WTA ranking–728.)	487	209	88	24	40	35	31	22		$7,980,355		

=== Doubles ===
Current through the 2026 French Open.

Tournament	2018	2019	2020	2021	2022	2023	2024	2025	2026	SR	W–L	Win %
Grand Slam tournaments
Australian Open	A	A	A	3R	1R	1R	A	3R	1R	0 / 5	4–5	44%
French Open	A	A	1R	3R	2R	F	3R	2R	1R	0 / 7	10–7	59%
Wimbledon	A	A	NH	1R	A	2R	3R	1R		0 / 4	3–4	50%
US Open	A	A	A	3R	2R	QF	1R	QF		0 / 5	9–5	64%
Win–Loss	0–0	0–0	0–1	5–4	2–3	9–4	4–3	6–4	0–2	0 / 21	26–21	55%
National representation
Billie Jean King Cup	A	PO	RR		RR	W	QF	A		1 / 4	4–0	100%
WTA 1000 tournaments
Qatar Open	A	NTI	A	NTI	A	NTI	2R	1R	2R	0 / 3	2–2	50%
Dubai Championships	NTI	A	NTI	A	NTI	QF	1R	1R	A	0 / 3	2–3	40%
Indian Wells Open	A	A	NH	QF	SF	2R	A	1R	A	0 / 4	5–4	56%
Miami Open	A	A	NH	A	1R	F	A	1R	1R	0 / 4	4–4	50%
Madrid Open	A	A	NH	A	2R	SF	A	1R	A	0 / 3	4–3	57%
Italian Open	A	A	A	A	A	A	2R	2R	A	0 / 2	2–2	50%
Canadian Open	A	1R	NH	2R	2R	A	SF	1R		0 / 5	5–5	50%
Cincinnati Open	A	A	A	A	A	A	F	A		0 / 1	3–1	75%
Guadalajara Open	Not Held				A	QF	Not Tier I			0 / 1	1–1	50%
China Open	A	A	Not Held			A	2R	1R		0 / 2	1–2	33%
Wuhan Open	A	A	Not Held				SF	2R		0 / 2	4–2	67%
Win–Loss	0–0	0–1	0–0	3–2	4–4	11–5	12–6	2–9	1–2	0 / 30	33–29	53%
Career statistics
	2018	2019	2020	2021	2022	2023	2024	2025	2026	SR	W–L	Win%
Tournaments	1	1	1	9	9	12	14	14	8	Career total: 69		
Titles	0	0	0	0	0	0	0	0	0	Career total: 0		
Finals	0	0	0	0	0	2	1	0	0	Career total: 3		
Hard win–loss	0–1	0–1	0–0	8–6	6–6	15–8	11–7	6–10	2–5	0 / 46	48–44	52%
Clay win–loss	0–0	0–0	0–1	1–2	2–2	9–3	6–4	2–3	1–3	0 / 18	21–18	54%
Grass win–loss	0–0	0–0	0–0	0–1	0–0	1–1	2–2	0–1	0–0	0 / 5	3–5	38%
Overall win–loss	0–1	0–1	0–1	9–9	8–8	25–12	19–13	8–14	3–8	0 / 69	72–67	52%
Win %	0%	0%	0%	50%	50%	68%	59%	36%	27%	Career total: 52%		
Year-end ranking	981	296	293	74	76	20	32	72				

== Grand Slam tournaments finals ==
=== Singles: 1 (runner-up) ===
Result	Year	Tournament	Surface	Opponent	Score
Loss	2021	US Open	Hard	(United Kingdom) Emma Raducanu	4–6, 3–6

=== Doubles: 1 (runner-up) ===
Result	Year	Tournament	Surface	Partner	Opponents	Score
Loss	2023	French Open	Clay	(United States) Taylor Townsend	(Chinese Taipei) Hsieh Su-wei (China) Wang Xinyu	6–1, 6–7^{(5–7)}, 1–6

== Other significant finals ==
=== WTA 1000 tournaments ===
==== Doubles: 2 (2 runner-ups) ====
Result	Year	Tournament	Surface	Partner	Opponents	Score
Loss	2023	Miami Open	Hard	(United States) Taylor Townsend	(United States) Coco Gauff (United States) Jessica Pegula	6–7^{(6–8)}, 2–6
Loss	2024	Cincinnati Open	Hard	(Kazakhstan) Yulia Putintseva	(United States) Asia Muhammad (New Zealand) Erin Routliffe	6–3, 1–6, [4–10]

== WTA Tour finals ==
=== Singles: 11 (6 titles, 5 runner-ups) ===
Legend Grand Slam (0–1) WTA 500 (2–3) International / WTA 250 (4–1)	Finals by surface Hard (6–4) Grass (0–1)	Finals by setting Outdoor (5–5) Indoor (1–0)

Result	W–L	Date	Tournament	Tier	Surface	Opponent	Score
Loss	0–1	Feb 2020	Mexican Open, Mexico	International	Hard	(United Kingdom) Heather Watson	4–6, 7–6^{(10–8)}, 1–6
Win	1–1	Mar 2021	Monterrey Open, Mexico	WTA 250	Hard	(Switzerland) Viktorija Golubic	6–1, 6–4
Loss	1–2	Sep 2021	US Open, US	Grand Slam	Hard	(United Kingdom) Emma Raducanu	4–6, 3–6
Win	2–2	Mar 2022	Monterrey Open, Mexico (2)	WTA 250	Hard	(Colombia) Camila Osorio	6–7^{(5–7)}, 6–4, 7–6^{(7–3)}
Win	3–2	Oct 2023	Hong Kong Open, Hong Kong (SAR)	WTA 250	Hard	(Czech Republic) Kateřina Siniaková	3–6, 6–4, 6–4
Loss	3–3	Jun 2024	Eastbourne International, UK	WTA 500	Grass	Daria Kasatkina	3–6, 4–6
Win	4–3	Jul 2025	Washington Open, US	WTA 500	Hard	Anna Kalinskaya	6–1, 6–2
Win	5–3	Oct 2025	Japan Women's Open, Japan	WTA 250	Hard	(Czech Republic) Tereza Valentová	6–0, 5–7, 6–3
Win	6–3	Sep 2026	Singapore Open, Singapore	WTA 500	Hard (i)	(Australia) Talia Gibson	7–5, 6–0
Loss	6–4	Oct 2026	Ningbo Open, China	WTA 500	Hard	(Kazakhstan) Elena Rybakina	2–6, 2–6
Loss	6–5	Nov 2026	Pan Pacific Open, Japan	WTA 500	Hard	Diana Shnaider	4–6, 7–5, 2–6

=== Doubles: 5 (5 runner-ups) ===
Legend Grand Slam (0–1) WTA 1000 (0–2) WTA 250 (0–2)	Finals by surface Hard (0–3) Clay (0–1) Grass (0–1)	Finals by setting Outdoor (0–5)

Result	W–L	Date	Tournament	Tier	Surface	Partner	Opponents	Score
Loss	0–1	Jan 2023	Auckland Classic, New Zealand	WTA 250	Hard	(United States) Bethanie Mattek-Sands	(Japan) Miyu Kato (Indonesia) Aldila Sutjiadi	6–1, 5–7, [4–10]
Loss	0–2	Apr 2023	Miami Open, US	WTA 1000	Hard	(United States) Taylor Townsend	(United States) Coco Gauff (United States) Jessica Pegula	6–7^{(6–8)}, 2–6
Loss	0–3	Jun 2023	French Open, France	Grand Slam	Clay	(United States) Taylor Townsend	(Chinese Taipei) Hsieh Su-wei (China) Wang Xinyu	6–1, 6–7^{(5–7)}, 1–6
Loss	0–4	Aug 2024	Cincinnati Open, US	WTA 1000	Hard	(Kazakhstan) Yulia Putintseva	(United States) Asia Muhammad (New Zealand) Erin Routliffe	6–3, 1–6, [4–10]
Loss	0–5	Jun 2026	Queen's Club Championships, England	WTA 500	Grass	(Germany) Laura Siegemund	(Slovakia) Tereza Mihalíková (Australia) Olivia Nicholls	3–6, 7–6^{(7–4)}, [5–10]

== WTA 125 finals ==
=== Doubles: 1 (runner-up) ===
Result	Date	Tournament	Surface	Partner	Opponents	Score
Loss	Apr 2025	Catalonia Open, Spain	Clay	(New Zealand) Lulu Sun	(Canada) Bianca Andreescu (Indonesia) Aldila Sutjiadi	2–6, 4–6

== ITF Circuit finals ==
=== Singles: 3 (1 title, 2 runner-ups) ===
Legend W80 tournaments (0–1) W25 tournaments (1–1)	Finals by surface Hard (1–2)

Result	W–L	Date	Tournament	Tier	Surface	Opponent	Score
Win	1–0	Jul 2019	Challenger de Gatineau, Canada	W25	Hard	(Canada) Carson Branstine	3–6, 6–1, 6–2
Loss	1–1	Jul 2019	Challenger de Granby, Canada	W80	Hard	(Australia) Lizette Cabrera	1–6, 4–6
Loss	1–2	Oct 2019	Waco Showdown, US	W25	Hard	(Mexico) Fernanda Contreras	3–6, 6–2, 1–6

=== Doubles: 4 (2 titles, 2 runner-ups) ===
Legend W60 tournaments (1–1) W25 tournaments (1–0) W15 tournaments (0–1)	Finals by surface Hard (2–2)

Result	W–L	Date	Tournament	Tier	Surface	Partner	Opponents	Score
Win	1–0	Jul 2019	Challenger de Gatineau, Canada	W25	Hard	(Canada) Rebecca Marino	(Chinese Taipei) Hsu Chieh-yu (Mexico) Marcela Zacarías	7–6^{(5)}, 6–3
Win	2–0	Oct 2019	Challenger de Saguenay, Canada	W60	Hard (i)	(Canada) Mélodie Collard	(United Kingdom) Samantha Murray Sharan (Netherlands) Bibiane Schoofs	7–6^{(3)}, 6–2
Loss	2–1	Nov 2019	Toronto Challenger, Canada	60,000	Hard (i)	(Canada) Mélodie Collard	(United States) Robin Anderson (France) Jessika Ponchet	6–7^{(7)}, 2–6
Loss	2–2	Oct 2020	ITF Sharm El Sheikh, Egypt	W15	Hard	(Canada) Bianca Fernandez	(Russia) Veronika Pepelyaeva (Russia) Anastasia Tikhonova	6–4, 3–6, [6–10]

== Team competition finals ==
Result	Date	Tournament	Surface	Team	Partners	Opponent team	Opponent players	Score
Win	Nov 2023	Billie Jean King Cup	Hard (i)	Canada	Marina Stakusic; Eugenie Bouchard; Gabriela Dabrowski; Rebecca Marino	Italy	Jasmine Paolini; Martina Trevisan; Elisabetta Cocciaretto; Lucia Bronzetti; Lucrezia Stefanini	2–0

== Junior Grand Slam finals ==
=== Girls' singles: 2 (1 title, 1 runner-up) ===
Result	Year	Tournament	Surface	Opponent	Score
Loss	2019	Australian Open	Hard	(Denmark) Clara Tauson	4–6, 3–6
Win	2019	French Open	Clay	(United States) Emma Navarro	6–3, 6–2

== WTA Tour career earnings ==
As of 10 November 2025

Year	Grand Slam singles titles	WTA singles titles	Total singles titles	Earnings ($)	Money list rank
2017	0	0	0	3,608	973
2018	0	0	0	9,899	618
2019	0	0	0	42,525	322
2020	0	0	0	356,669	61
2021	0	1	1	1,772,625	13
2022	0	1	1	1,046,729	34
2023	0	1	1	1,026,988	37
2024	0	0	0	1,144,621	37
2025	0	2	2	1,450,310	29
Career	0	5	5	4,259,359	163

== Career Grand Slam statistics ==
=== Seedings ===
The tournaments won by Fernandez are in boldface, and advanced into finals by Fernandez are in italics.

Year	Australian Open	French Open	Wimbledon	US Open
2020	Q	–	cancelled	–
2021	–	–	–	– (1)
2022	23rd	17th	A	14th
2023	–	–	–	–
2024	32nd	31st	30th	23rd
2025	30th	27th	29th	31st
2026	22nd			

- Key: (A) absent; (Q) qualifier; (DNQ) did not qualify; (RT) retired; (NH) Not Held; (–) unseeded; (LL) lucky looser.

=== Best Grand Slam singles results details ===
Australian Open
2025 (30th)
Round	Opponent	Rank	Score
1R	(Ukraine) Yuliia Starodubtseva	100	7–5, 6–4
2R	(Spain) Cristina Bucșa	71	3–6, 6–4, 6–4
3R	(United States) Coco Gauff (3)	3	4–6, 2–6

Wimbledon Championships
2023 (not seeded)
Round	Opponent	Rank	Score
1R	(Ukraine) Kateryna Baindl	85	6–4, 4–6, 6–4
2R	(France) Caroline Garcia (5)	5	6–3, 4–6, 6–7^{(6–10)}

French Open
2022 (17th)
Round	Opponent	Rank	Score
1R	(France) Kristina Mladenovic	107	6–0, 7–5
2R	(Czech Republic) Kateřina Siniaková	56	6–3, 6–2
3R	(Switzerland) Belinda Bencic (14)	14	7–5, 3–6, 7–5
4R	(United States) Amanda Anisimova (27)	28	6–3, 4–6, 6–3
QF	(Italy) Martina Trevisan	59	2–6, 7–6^{(7–3)}, 3–6

US Open
2021 (not seeded)
Round	Opponent	Rank	Score
1R	(Croatia) Ana Konjuh	88	7–6^{(7–3)}, 6–2
2R	(Estonia) Kaia Kanepi	70	7–5, 7–5
3R	(Japan) Naomi Osaka (3)	3	5–7, 7–6^{(7–2)}, 6–4
4R	(Germany) Angelique Kerber (16)	17	4–6, 7–6^{(7–5)}, 6–2
QF	(Ukraine) Elina Svitolina (5)	5	6–3, 3–6, 7–6^{(7–5)}
SF	(Belarus) Aryna Sabalenka (2)	2	7–6^{(7–3)}, 4–6, 6–4
F	**(United Kingdom) Emma Raducanu (Q)**	150	4–6, 3–6

== Wins against top 10 players ==
- Fernandez has a 11–29 record against players who were, at the time the match was played, ranked in the top 10.

Season	2020	2021	2022	2023	2024	2025	2026	Total
Wins	1	3	0	1	2	2	2	11

#	Opponent	Rk	Event	Surface	Rd	Score	Rk
2020
1.	(Switzerland) Belinda Bencic	5	BJK Cup, Switzerland	Hard (i)	QR	6–2, 7–6^{(7–3)}	185
2021
2.	(Japan) Naomi Osaka	3	US Open, United States	Hard	3R	5–7, 7–6^{(7–2)}, 6–4	73
3.	(Ukraine) Elina Svitolina	5	US Open, United States	Hard	QF	6–3, 3–6, 7–6^{(7–5)}	73
4.	(Belarus) Aryna Sabalenka	2	US Open, United States	Hard	SF	7–6^{(7–3)}, 4–6, 6–4	73
2023
5.	(Czech Republic) Markéta Vondroušová	7	BJK Cup, Spain	Hard (i)	SF	6–2, 2–6, 6–3	35
2024
6.	(China) Zheng Qinwen	7	Qatar Open, Qatar	Hard	3R	7–5, 6–3	38
7.	(Kazakhstan) Elena Rybakina	4	Cincinnati Open, United States	Hard	2R	3–6, 7–6^{(7–3)}, 6–4	27
2025
8.	(United States) Emma Navarro	9	Qatar Open, Qatar	Hard	2R	6–2, 6–2	27
9.	(United States) Jessica Pegula	4	Washington Open, United States	Hard	2R	6–3, 1–6, 7–5	36
2026
10.	Mirra Andreeva	5	Canadian Open, Canada	Hard	3R	6–1, 6–4	34
11.	Mirra Andreeva	5	Singapore Open, Singapore	Hard (i)	QF	6–2, 7–5	31

- Statistics correct as of 25 September 2026.
