= 2021 LTP Charleston Pro Tennis II =

Tennis tournament

- Date: 21–27 June 2021
- Edition: 6th
- Category: ITF Women's World Tennis Tour
- Prize money: $60,000
- Surface: Clay
- Location: Charleston, South Carolina, United States

Champions

Singles
- (Greece) Despina Papamichail

Doubles
- (Hungary) Fanny Stollár / (Indonesia) Aldila Sutjiadi
← 2019 ·	LTP Charleston Pro Tennis	· 2022 →

The 2021 LTP Charleston Pro Tennis II was a professional women's tennis tournament played on outdoor clay courts. It was the sixth edition of the tournament which was part of the 2021 ITF Women's World Tennis Tour. It took place in Charleston, South Carolina, United States between 21 and 27 June 2021.

== Singles main-draw entrants ==
=== Seeds ===
Country	Player	Rank^{1}	Seed
SUI	Conny Perrin	251	1
GRE	Despina Papamichail	258	2
USA	Hanna Chang	268	3
USA	Alycia Parks	275	4
JPN	Kyōka Okamura	280	5
BRA	Gabriela Cé	281	6
MEX	Marcela Zacarías	300	7
USA	Alexa Glatch	303	8

- ^{1} Rankings are as of 14 June 2021.

=== Other entrants ===
The following players received wildcards into the singles main draw:

- (United States) Elvina Kalieva
- (United States) Emma Navarro
- (United States) Taylor Ng
- (United States) Eleana Yu

The following player received entry using a protected ranking:

- (China) Xu Shilin

The following player received entry as a special exempt:

- (United States) Peyton Stearns

The following players received entry from the qualifying draw:

- (United States) Charlotte Chavatipon
- (United States) Louisa Chirico
- (United States) Emma Davis
- (United States) Quinn Gleason
- (New Zealand) Paige Hourigan
- (United States) Maria Sanchez
- (Japan) Erika Sema
- (Bulgaria) Gergana Topalova

== Champions ==
=== Singles ===
- (Greece) Despina Papamichail def. (Brazil) Gabriela Cé, 1–6, 6–3, 6–3

=== Doubles ===
- (Hungary) Fanny Stollár / (Indonesia) Aldila Sutjiadi def. (United States) Rasheeda McAdoo / (United States) Peyton Stearns, 6–0, 6–4
