= Caroline Dolehide =

American tennis player (born 1998)

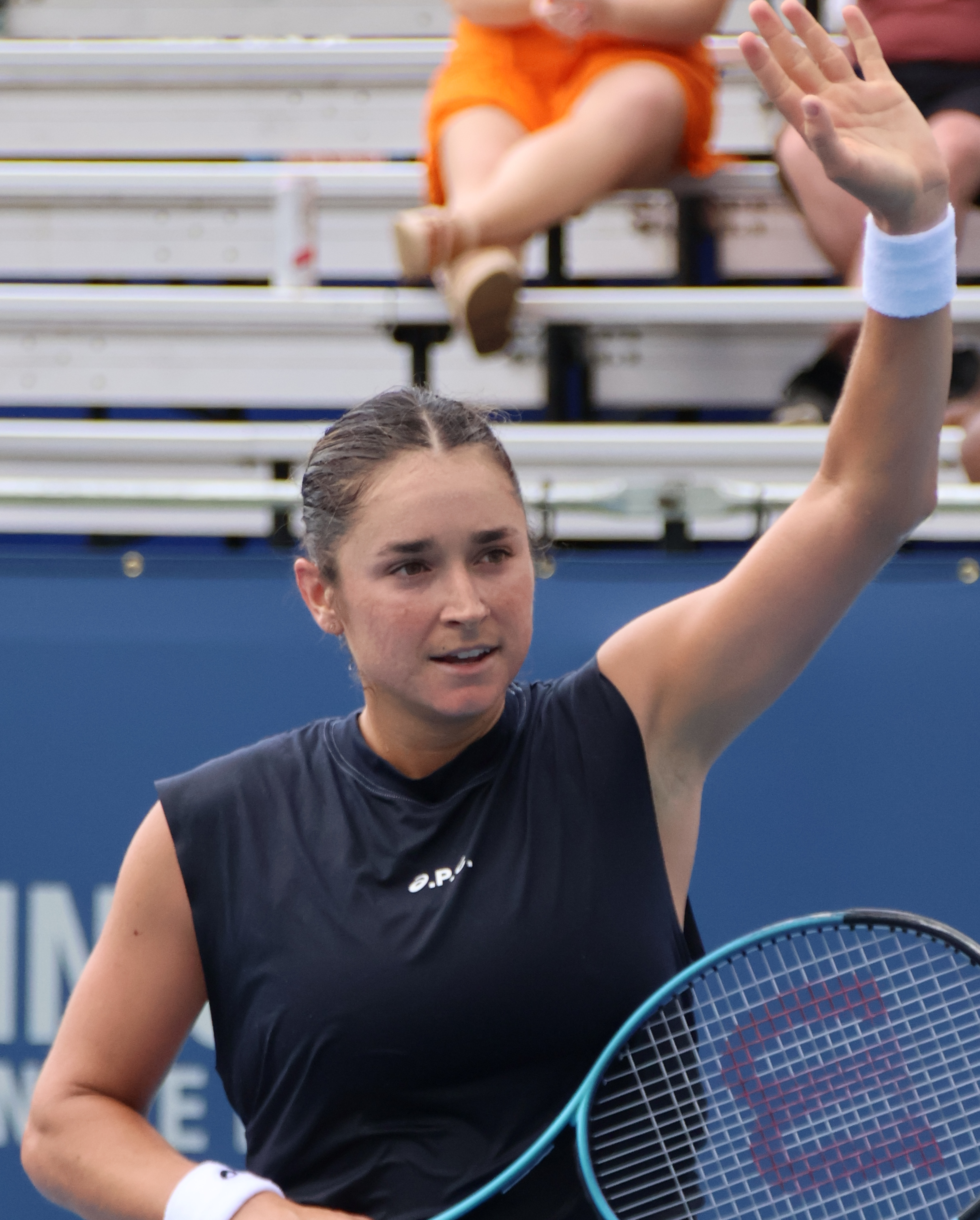
- Dolehide at the 2025 Washington Open
- Country (sports): United States
- Residence: Orlando, Florida, US
- Born: September 5, 1998 (age 28) Hinsdale, Illinois, US
- Height: 1.78 m (5 ft 10 in)
- Turned pro: 2017
- Plays: Right-handed (two-handed backhand)
- Coach: Jorge Todero
- Prize money: US$ 4,861,328

Singles
- Career record: 321–251
- Career titles: 0
- Highest ranking: No. 41 (October 2, 2023)
- Current ranking: No. 174 (November 9, 2026)

Grand Slam singles results
- Australian Open: 2R (2024, 2025)
- French Open: 2R (2018, 2025)
- Wimbledon: 2R (2025)
- US Open: 2R (2024)

Doubles
- Career record: 192–117
- Career titles: 3
- Highest ranking: No. 9 (August 26, 2024)
- Current ranking: No. 132 (November 9, 2026)

Grand Slam doubles results
- Australian Open: QF (2020, 2022, 2023)
- French Open: SF (2024)
- Wimbledon: SF (2021, 2023, 2024)
- US Open: SF (2019, 2022)

Other doubles tournaments
- Tour Finals: RR (2024)

Grand Slam mixed doubles results
- Australian Open: 1R (2021)
Medal record
Women's tennis
Representing United States
Pan American Games
Gold medal – first place	2019 Lima	Women's doubles
Silver medal – second place	2019 Lima	Women's singles
- Last updated on: November 9, 2026.

Caroline Dolehide (/ˈdɒləhaɪd/ DOL-ə-hyde; born September 5, 1998) is an American professional tennis player. She achieved a career-high singles ranking of world No. 41 on 2 October 2023, and a best doubles ranking of No. 9, on 26 August 2024. Dolehide has won three WTA Tour and two WTA. 125 doubles titles, as well as 19 titles on the ITF Women's Circuit, 10 in singles and nine in doubles.

Her best performances on the WTA Tour in singles came as a finalist at the WTA 1000 in Guadalajara and in doubles as a champion in Canada with Desirae Krawczyk. Dolehide is a six-times majors semifinalist in doubles: at the 2019 US Open with Vania King, and at the 2022 US Open with Storm Sanders; in 2021 and in 2023 at Wimbledon with Zhang Shuai; and in 2024 at Roland Garros and at Wimbledon with Desirae Krawczyk.

Dolehide was also a two-time Grand Slam tournament finalist in doubles as a junior. She made her WTA Tour debut in July 2017, and won her first title in doubles at the Monterrey Open in Mexico in March 2021. Dolehide also won her first majors match at the 2018 French Open. She has an aggressive style of play, and possesses the ability to hit powerful groundstroke winners, especially on the forehand side.

== Early life and background ==
Dolehide grew up in the Chicago suburbs, where she began playing tennis at five years old. She has an older sister, Courtney who played college tennis at UCLA, coached women's tennis at UT Austin, and became the head coach of men's and women's tennis at Georgetown in 2018. Her younger sister Stephanie also plays tennis, and has committed to West Point. Her brother Brian plays collegiate golf at Florida Atlantic University.

Dolehide worked with her youth coach Tom Lockhart since the age of six. Dolehide attended Hinsdale Central High School until her sophomore year, when she moved to Florida to train with the United States Tennis Association (USTA) at the USTA National Campus. At this point, she began working with Stephen Huss, a former Australian professional tennis player. Dolehide had verbally committed to play tennis at UCLA, but ultimately decided to forgo attending college to pursue a career as a professional.

== Career ==
=== Juniors ===
In 2014, Dolehide reached the semifinals of the girls' singles event at the US Open, despite needing to qualify for the main draw. She upset three of the top ten seeds in the tournament, including Markéta Vondroušová in the first round, before losing to the eventual champion Marie Bouzková. Later that year, she also made it to the semifinals of the Eddie Herr Championships and the quarterfinals at the Orange Bowl, two prestigious Grade 1 tournaments. This helped her rise to a career high ITF junior ranking of No. 16 in the world the following summer. Dolehide was then forced to skip the 2015 US Open and most of the remaining events that season after breaking her left foot. This injury prevented her from continuing to climb in the rankings.

As a junior, Dolehide was more successful in doubles than in singles. In April 2015, she partnered with Ena Shibahara to win the USTA International Spring Championships, her only title at a Grade 1 event. The following week, the duo made it to another final at the Easter Bowl, this time losing to Sofia Kenin and Katie Swan. In the last few tournaments of her junior career, Dolehide achieved two of her best results with two major runner-ups, the first at the 2015 French Open with partner Katerina Stewart and the second at the 2016 US Open with partner Kayla Day.

=== 2016–17: ITF Circuit titles & WTA Tour quarterfinal, top 150 ===
Dolehide began playing regularly on the ITF Women's Circuit in 2016, after missing the second half of 2015 with a broken left foot. In June, she won both the singles and doubles events at the $10k tournament in Buffalo for her first professional titles. The following year, she won two more tournaments at the $25k-level, including Winnipeg in July. Later that month, Dolehide qualified for the Stanford Classic to make her WTA Tour main-draw debut. She won her first tour-level match against world No. 48, Naomi Osaka, before losing to compatriot Madison Keys in the next round. This success helped her crack the top 200 of the WTA rankings for the first time. After the 2017 US Open, Dolehide made her first WTA Tour quarterfinal at the Tournoi de Québec to rise to a career-high ranking of No. 137 on 18 September 2017.

Dolehide also played in the doubles event at Stanford with her Junior US Open partner Kayla Day. The pair had already reached two finals and won one title on the ITF Circuit in February, and they continued their success together by making it to the semifinals in their doubles debut on the WTA Tour. The two of them were also awarded a wildcard into the US Open, where they upset tenth-seeded veteran doubles specialists Abigail Spears and Katarina Srebotnik in their Grand Slam debut in doubles. A few weeks later, Dolehide followed up this performance by winning a 100k title at the Abierto Tampico with veteran María Irigoyen, a victory that helped her finish the year just inside the top 100 of the WTA doubles rankings.

=== 2018: Major & WTA 1000 debuts in singles ===
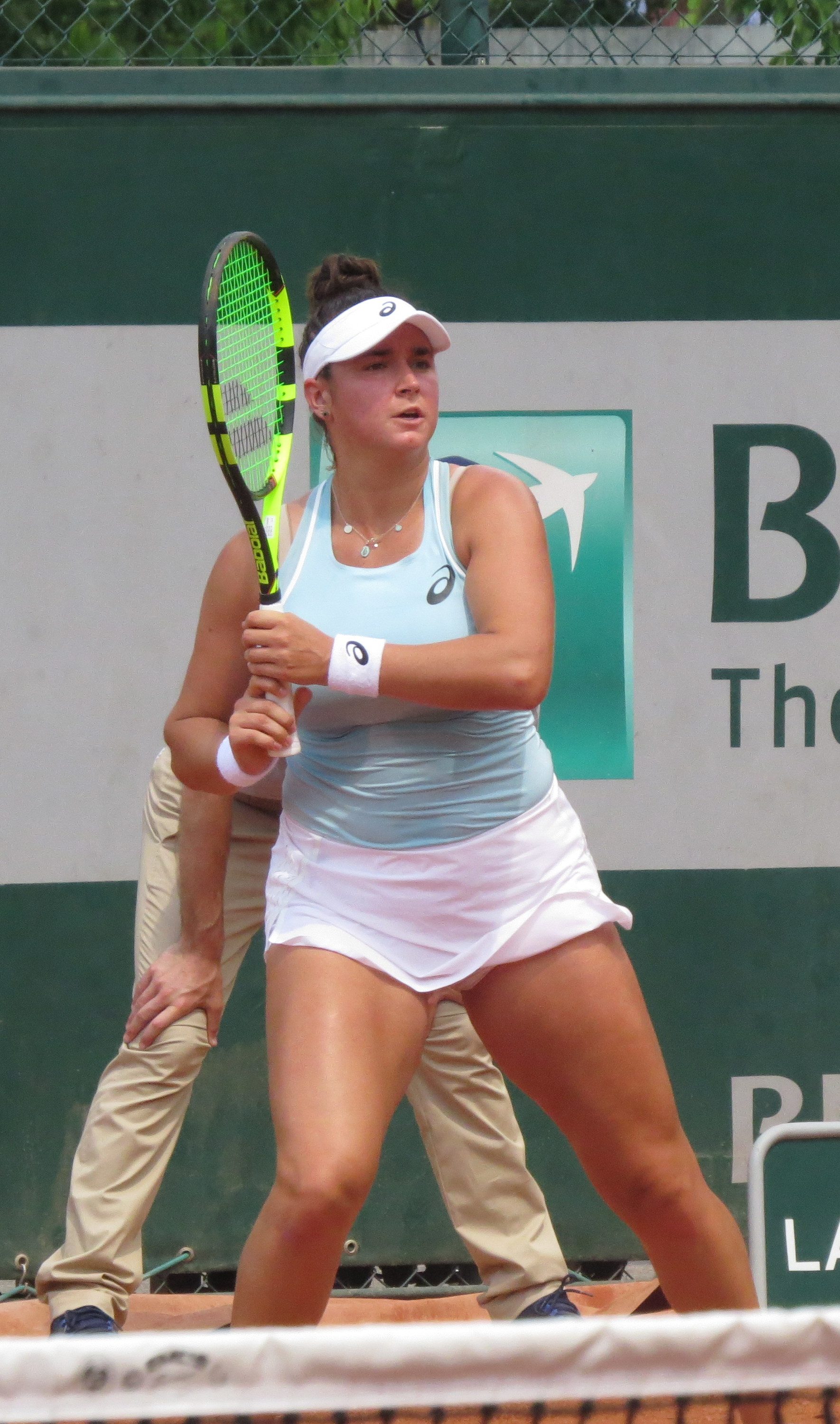
Dolehide at the 2018 French Open

In March 2018, Dolehide was awarded a wildcard into the main draw of the Indian Wells Open, where she picked up her first two match wins at a Premier Mandatory tournament, including a second round victory over No. 30, Dominika Cibulková. She also pushed Simona Halep to three sets in her third-round loss to the world No. 1 player. Dolehide continued her momentum into the clay-court season, where she won the $60k event at Indian Harbour Beach, the biggest title of her career.

She closed out the clay-court season by qualifying for the French Open. In her major main-draw debut in singles, Dolehide defeated Viktorija Golubic before losing to Madison Keys in the following match. In the next few months, she also made her debuts at Wimbledon as a lucky loser and the US Open as a direct acceptance, but lost in the opening round in both tournaments. She also received a wild card into the US Open doubles draw with Christina McHale and reached the third round.

=== 2019–21: US Open & Wimbledon SFs, WTA 250 title & top 25 in doubles ===
Following the US Open, Dolehide did not win multiple main-draw matches at a singles event again, until a $25k event in April 2019, where she finished runner-up to Barbora Krejčíková. Nonetheless, she dropped out of the top 200 since she was defending points from a $60k title. Dolehide fared better in doubles in the first half of the year, reaching two $100k finals. She finished runner-up at Bonita Springs in Florida with Usue Maitane Arconada, before winning a title at the Surbiton Trophy with Jennifer Brady. Dolehide continued to struggle in singles and reached a year-low of No. 283 in the singles rankings on 12 August 2019.

Her form began to rebound in a big way, after she brought back two medals from the 2019 Pan American Games in Lima, Peru. The first was a gold medal in doubles, pairing with Usue Arconada to make the 20 year-old duo the first American gold medalists in women's doubles at the Pan Am Games since Pam Shriver and Donna Faber in 1991 in Havana. The next day, Dolehide earned a second-place finish in singles and added a silver medal to her haul.

Dolehide won her first singles title of the year at the $60k 2019 Concord Open. She then qualified for the US Open, where she lost her only WTA Tour match of the year to No. 18 Wang Qiang. In the doubles event, Dolehide partnered with compatriot Vania King to produce her best result of the year. The pair reached semifinals, defeating the 14th-seeded team of Lyudmyla Kichenok and Jeļena Ostapenko, before losing to the eventual champions Elise Mertens and Aryna Sabalenka. With this performance, Dolehide rose to No. 72 in doubles. Before the end of the year, she won another $60k title at the Charleston Pro to return to the top 200 of the singles rankings.

Dolehide won her maiden WTA Tour doubles title, partnering Asia Muhammad at the 2021 Monterrey Open where they defeated Heather Watson and Zheng Saisai in the final in straight sets.

=== 2022: Australian Open debut, US Open semis in doubles ===
She made her singles debut at the Australian Open and the WTA 1000 Guadalajara Open after qualifying.

In doubles, she reached the quarterfinals at the Australian Open and semifinals at the US Open, partnering Storm Hunter.

=== 2023: WTA 1000 final & top 50 in singles, major semis in doubles ===
In 2023, Dolehide reached back-to-back quarterfinals at the Australian Open, partnering Anna Kalinskaya.

Ranked No. 206, she reached her second WTA Tour-level quarterfinal at the 2023 Monterrey Open as a qualifier defeating Jule Niemeier and Anna Karolína Schmiedlová and her first since Québec City in 2017. As a result, she moved close to 40 positions up in the rankings.

She reached the round of 16 at the Charleston Open defeating Sabine Lisicki and Linda Fruhvirtová, before losing to eventual champion Ons Jabeur.

She made her top 100 singles debut on 22 May 2023 at world No. 99, after winning the $60k title in Naples, Florida.

She reached the semifinals in doubles at Wimbledon with Zhang Shuai, before losing to third seeds Elise Mertens and Storm Hunter.

At the Guadalajara Open, she reached the third round of a WTA 1000 for the second time in her career. Next, she defeated eighth seed Ekaterina Alexandrova to reach her first WTA 1000 singles quarterfinal. Then, she defeated Martina Trevisan and reached her first WTA Tour semifinal in a close to three hours match. She became the eighth player to reach a WTA 1000 semifinal with a ranking outside of the top 100 and the lowest ranked player at world No. 111 since Svetlana Kuznetsova at world No. 153 in Cincinnati 2019. With her win over Sofia Kenin and reaching the final, she also became the second lowest ranked finalist (after Kuznetsova) at a WTA 1000 level since the introduction of the format in 2009. She was also the sixth first-time finalist at WTA 1000 events in 2023, following Rybakina, Kalinina, Samsonova, Gauff and Muchova. Excluding 2009, the year when the format started, only 2018 has had more (a record of seven). As a result, she moved up close to 70 positions to a new career-high ranking in the top 45, on 25 September 2023. At the same tournament, immediately following her singles quarterfinal match, she also reached the semifinals with Asia Muhammad defeating Miyu Kato and Aldila Sutjiadi in one hour. They subsequently lost to top seeds and eventual champions, Elise Mertens and Storm Hunter.

=== 2024: WTA 1000 title and world No. 9 in doubles ===
Partnering Desirae Krawczyk, she reached the final of the WTA 1000 Qatar Ladies Open but lost to Luisa Stefani and Krawczyk's former partner Demi Schuurs.

At the French Open, she reached the semifinals for the first time at this tournament with Krawczyk but lost to Coco Gauff and Katerina Siniaková. Despite the loss, she made her top 20 debut at world No. 18 in doubles on 10 June 2024.

At the Nottingham Open, she lost in the first round to wildcard Francesca Jones. At the Birmingham Classic, where she entered the main draw as a lucky loser, she defeated Karolína Plíšková saving two match points, and fifth seed Elise Mertens by retirement to reach the quarterfinals where she lost to eventual champion Yulia Putintseva. Partnering Krawczyk, she made the semifinals at Wimbledon where they lost to second seeds, Gabriela Dabrowski and Erin Routliffe.

In the beginning of the American summer swing, at the WTA 500 Washington DC Open, Dolehide defeated Lesia Tsurenko, second seed Daria Kasatkina and Amanda Anisimova to reach the semifinals where she lost to eventual champion Paula Badosa. She won her first WTA 1000 doubles title at the Canadian Open with Krawczyk and reached world No. 12 in the rankings on 12 August 2024. Following a second round showing with Krawczyk at the Cincinnati Open, she reached the top 10 in the doubles rankings on 19 August 2024, and world No. 9 a week later on 27 August 2024. In singles, at the same tournament she also received a wildcard for the main draw but lost to qualifier Taylor Townsend. At the US Open, she recorded her first singles win at the tournament over 11th seed Danielle Collins, before losing in the second round to Sara Errani.

At the Guangzhou Open, Dolehide reached her first singles final in more than a year (since 2023 in Guadalajara) with wins over lucky loser Elena Pridankina, second seed Marie Bouzková, seventh seed Jéssica Bouzas Maneiro, and then Lucia Bronzetti in the semifinal where she saved four match points. She lost the final against Olga Danilović in straight sets. As a result, she returned to the top 100 on 28 October 2024, raising close to 25 positions up in the singles rankings, having been ranked No. 101 in the beginning of the tournament.

Partnering Desirae Krawczyk, Dolehide qualified for the end-of-season WTA Finals in Riyadh, Saudi Arabia, but they were eliminated in the group stages losing all three of their matches.

=== 2025: ATX Open quarterfinal, Indian Wells third round ===
At the ATX Open, Dolehide defeated qualifier Anastasia Zakharova and Varvara Gracheva to make it through to the quarterfinals, at which point her run was ended by Greet Minnen. The following week at the WTA 1000 tournament in Indian Wells, she overcame Kamilla Rakhimova and lucky loser Eva Lys, before losing to 18th seed Marta Kostyuk in the third round.

=== 2026: Third career doubles title ===
As top seeds, Dolehide partnered with Irina Khromacheva to win her third WTA Tour doubles title at the Copa Colsanitas, defeating Valeriya Strakhova and Anastasia Tikhonova in the final. Teaming with Alexandra Vagramov, she won the WTA 125 Vancouver Open, overcoming Anna Rogers and Allura Zamarripa in the final.

== Playing style ==
Dolehide is an aggressive baseliner. She is known for having a strong serve and powerful groundstrokes, which she uses to a hit a high number of winners. Her forehand in particular is one of her best shots and was already very advanced while she was still a teenager. CiCi Bellis faced Dolehide at the 2014 Orange Bowl when both players were still juniors and commented that Dolehide "hits probably the hardest by far" compared to Bellis's other opponents and said "her serve is amazing." Venus Williams defeated Dolehide at the 2018 Canadian Open, but commented that "she had a really great second serve."

== Performance timelines ==
Key
W	F	SF	QF	#R	RR	Q#	P#	DNQ	A	Z#	PO	G	S	B	NMS	NTI	P	NH

(W) winner; (F) finalist; (SF) semifinalist; (QF) quarterfinalist; (#R) rounds 4, 3, 2, 1; (RR) round-robin stage; (Q#) qualification round; (P#) preliminary round; (DNQ) did not qualify; (A) absent; (Z#) Davis/Fed Cup Zonal Group (with number indication) or (PO) play-off; (G) gold, (S) silver or (B) bronze Olympic/Paralympic medal; (NMS) not a Masters tournament; (NTI) not a Tier I tournament; (P) postponed; (NH) not held; (SR) strike rate (events won / competed); (W–L) win–loss record.
To avoid confusion and double counting, these charts are updated at the conclusion of a tournament or when the player's participation has ended.

Only main-draw results in WTA Tour, Grand Slam tournaments, Fed Cup/Billie Jean King Cup and Olympic Games are included in win–loss records.

=== Singles ===
Current through the 2026 US Open.

Tournament	2016	2017	2018	2019	2020	2021	2022	2023	2024	2025	2026	SR	W–L	Win %
Grand Slam tournaments
Australian Open	A	A	Q2	Q2	Q3	Q1	1R	Q1	2R	2R	A	0 / 3	2–3	40%
French Open	A	A	2R	A	Q1	Q1	Q2	Q1	1R	2R	A	0 / 3	2–3	40%
Wimbledon	A	A	1R	Q2	NH	Q1	A	1R	1R	2R	Q1	0 / 4	1–4	20%
US Open	Q1	Q1	1R	1R	1R	Q3	Q1	1R	2R	1R	Q1	0 / 6	1–6	14%
Win–Loss	0–0	0–0	1–3	0–1	0–1	0–0	0–1	0–2	2–4	3–4	0–0	0 / 16	6–16	27%
WTA 1000
Qatar Open (Note: The first Premier 5 event of the year has switched back and forth between the Dubai Tennis Championships and the Qatar Ladies Open since 2009 until 2024. Dubai was classified as a Premier 5 event from 2009 to 2011 before being succeeded by Doha for the 2012–2014 period. In 2015, Dubai regained its Premier 5 status, while Doha was demoted to Premier status. The Premier 5 tournaments were reclassified as WTA 1000 tournaments in 2021.)	A	A	A	A	A	A	A	A	1R	A	A	0 / 1	0–1	0%
Dubai	A	A	A	A	A	A	A	A	1R	A	A	0 / 1	0–1	0%
Indian Wells Open	A	A	3R	Q1	NH	Q2	A	Q2	3R	3R	Q1	0 / 3	6–3	67%
Miami Open	A	A	A	Q1	NH	Q1	Q2	A	1R	Q1	Q1	0 / 1	0–1	0%
Madrid Open	A	A	Q1	A	NH	A	A	A	3R	2R	A	0 / 2	3–2	60%
Italian Open	A	A	A	A	NH	A	A	A	1R	2R	A	0 / 2	1–2	33%
Canadian Open	A	A	1R	A	NH	A	A	A	1R	1R	A	0 / 3	0–3	0%
Cincinnati Open	A	Q1	Q1	A	Q2	A	A	A	1R	1R	1R	0 / 3	0–3	0%
Guadalajara Open	NH						1R	F	NMS		A	0 / 2	5–2	71%
Pan Pacific / Wuhan Open (Note: In 2014, the Pan Pacific Open was downgraded to a Premier event and replaced by the Wuhan Open. The Premier 5 tournaments were reclassified as WTA 1000 tournaments in 2021.)	A	A	Q1	A	NH				1R	1R	A	0 / 2	0–2	0%
China Open	A	A	Q1	A	NH			A	2R	1R	A	0 / 2	0–2	0%
Win–Loss	0–0	0–0	2–2	0–0	0–0	0–0	0–1	5–1	4–10	4–7	0–1	0 / 22	15–22	41%
Career statistics
	2016	2017	2018	2019	2020	2021	2022	2023	2024	2025	2026	SR	W–L	Win %
Tournaments	0	2	8	1	4	6	5	5	24	8	1	Career total: 63		
Titles	0	0	0	0	0	0	0	0	0	0	0	Career total: 0		
Finals	0	0	0	0	0	0	0	1	1	0	0	Career total: 2		
Overall win–loss	0–0	2–2	4–8	0–1	1–4	1–6	2–5	9–5	17–24	9–13	0–1	0 / 69	45–69	39%
Year–end ranking (Note: 2014: WTA ranking–1078, 2015: WTA ranking–n/a.)	347	148	128	154	151	195	172	42	82	112		$2,284,419		

=== Doubles ===
Current through the 2026 Cincinnati Open

Tournament	2017	2018	2019	2020	2021	2022	2023	2024	2025	2026	SR	W–L	Win %
Grand Slam tournaments
Australian Open	A	A	A	QF	1R	QF	QF	2R	1R	A	0 / 6	10–6	63%
French Open	A	A	A	2R	2R	2R	1R	SF	1R	A	0 / 6	7–6	54%
Wimbledon	A	Q1	A	NH	SF	A	SF	SF	QF	2R	0 / 5	15–5	75%
US Open	2R	3R	SF	1R	QF	SF	1R	2R	1R	A	0 / 9	15–9	63%
Win–Loss	1–1	2–1	4–1	4–3	8–4	8–3	7–4	10–4	2–4	1–1	0 / 26	47–26	64%
WTA 1000
Qatar Open	A	A	A	A	A	A	A	F	A	A	0 / 1	4–1	80%
Dubai	A	A	A	A	A	A	A	1R	A	A	0 / 1	0–1	0%
Indian Wells Open	A	A	A	NH	A	A	A	2R	1R	A	0 / 2	1–2	33%
Miami Open	A	A	A	NH	A	A	1R	1R	QF	A	0 / 3	2–3	40%
Madrid Open	A	A	A	NH	A	A	A	QF	1R	A	0 / 2	2–2	50%
Italian Open	A	A	A	NH	A	A	A	SF	1R	A	0 / 1	3–1	75%
Canadian Open	A	A	A	NH	A	A	A	W	SF	A	1 / 3	7–2	78%
Cincinnati Open	A	2R	A	2R	A	1R	A	2R	A	1R	0 / 5	3–5	38%
Guadalajara Open	NH					A	SF	NMS	A	A	0 / 1	3–1	75%
China Open	A	A	A	NH			A	1R	A	A	0 / 1	0–1	0%
Wuhan Open	A	A	A	NH				2R	A	A	0 / 1	0–1	0%
Career statistics
Overall win–loss	3–3	3–2	4–2	8–7	21–12	16–8	17–12	26–15	5–5	0–1	Total: 103–67		
Year-end ranking	99	163	62	38	27	35	40	14	43				

== Significant finals ==
=== WTA 1000 tournaments ===
==== Singles: 1 (runner-up) ====
Result	Year	Tournament	Surface	Opponent	Score
Loss	2023	Guadalajara Open	Hard	(Greece) Maria Sakkari	5–7, 3–6

==== Doubles: 2 (1 title, 1 runner-up) ====
Result	Year	Tournament	Surface	Partner	Opponent	Score
Loss	2024	Qatar Ladies Open	Hard	(United States) Desirae Krawczyk	(Netherlands) Demi Schuurs (Brazil) Luisa Stefani	4–6, 2–6
Win	2024	Canadian Open	Hard	(United States) Desirae Krawczyk	(Canada) Gabriela Dabrowski (New Zealand) Erin Routliffe	7–6^{(7–2)}, 3–6, [10–7]

== WTA Tour finals ==
=== Singles: 2 (2 runner-ups) ===
Legend WTA 1000 (0–1) WTA 250 (0–1)	Finals by surface Hard (0–2)	Finals by setting Outdoor (0–2)

Result	W–L	Date	Tournament	Tier	Surface	Opponent	Score
Loss	0–1	Sep 2023	Guadalajara Open, Mexico	WTA 1000	Hard	(Greece) Maria Sakkari	5–7, 3–6
Loss	0–2	Oct 2024	Guangzhou Open, China	WTA 250	Hard	(Serbia) Olga Danilović	3–6, 1–6

=== Doubles: 9 (3 titles, 6 runner-ups) ===
Legend WTA 1000 (1–1) WTA 500 (0–3) WTA 250 (2–2)	Finals by surface Hard (2–3) Clay (1–1) Grass (0–2)	Finals by setting Outdoor (3–6)

Result	W–L	Date	Tournament	Tier	Surface	Partner	Opponents	Score
Win	1–0	Mar 2021	Monterrey Open, Mexico	WTA 250	Hard	(United States) Asia Muhammad	(United Kingdom) Heather Watson (China) Zheng Saisai	6–2, 6–3
Loss	1–1	Jun 2021	Nottingham Open, UK	WTA 250	Grass	(Australia) Storm Sanders	(Ukraine) Lyudmyla Kichenok (Japan) Makoto Ninomiya	4–6, 7–6^{(7–3)}, [8–10]
Loss	1–2	Oct 2021	Chicago Fall Classic, United States	WTA 500	Hard	(United States) CoCo Vandeweghe	(Czech Republic) Květa Peschke (Germany) Andrea Petkovic	3–6, 1–6
Loss	1–3	Jun 2022	Nottingham Open, UK	WTA 250	Grass	(Romania) Monica Niculescu	(Brazil) Beatriz Haddad Maia (China) Zhang Shuai	6–7^{(2–7)}, 3–6
Loss	1–4	Feb 2024	Qatar Ladies Open	WTA 1000	Hard	(United States) Desirae Krawczyk	(Netherlands) Demi Schuurs (Brazil) Luisa Stefani	4–6, 2–6
Win	2–4	Aug 2024	Canadian Open, Canada	WTA 1000	Hard	(United States) Desirae Krawczyk	(Canada) Gabriela Dabrowski (New Zealand) Erin Routliffe	7–6^{(7–2)}, 3–6, [10–7]
Loss	2–5	Mar 2025	Charleston Open, United States	WTA 500	Clay	(United States) Desirae Krawczyk	(Latvia) Jeļena Ostapenko (New Zealand) Erin Routliffe	4–6, 2–6
Loss	2–6	Jul 2025	Washington Open, United States	WTA 500	Hard	(United States) Sofia Kenin	(United States) Taylor Townsend (China) Zhang Shuai	1–6, 1–6
Win	3–6	Apr 2026	Copa Colsanitas, Colombia	WTA 250	Clay	Irina Khromacheva	(Ukraine) Valeriya Strakhova; Anastasia Tikhonova	7–6^{(7–5)}, 6–4

== WTA 125 finals ==
=== Doubles: 2 (titles) ===
Result	W–L	Date	Tournament	Surface	Partner	Opponents	Score
Win	1–0	Jun 2023	Solgironès Open, Spain	Clay	Diana Shnaider	(Spain) Aliona Bolsova (Spain) Rebeka Masarova	7–6^{(7–5)}, 6–3
Win	2–0	Aug 2026	Vancouver Open, Canada	Hard	(Canada) Alexandra Vagramov	(United States) Anna Rogers (United States) Allura Zamarripa	6–1, 3–6, [10–6]

== ITF Circuit finals ==
=== Singles: 14 (10 titles, 4 runner-ups) ===
Legend $100,000 tournaments (2–0) $60,000 tournaments (4–2) $25,000 tournaments (3–2) $10,000 tournaments (1–0)	Finals by surface Hard (5–2) Clay (5–2)

Result	W–L	Date	Tournament	Tier	Surface	Opponent	Score
Win	1–0	Jun 2016	ITF Buffalo, United States	10,000	Clay	(United States) Lauren Herring	6–1, 7–5
Loss	1–1	Oct 2016	ITF Stillwater, United States	25,000	Hard	(United States) Danielle Collins	0–1 ret.
Win	2–1	Feb 2017	ITF Surprise, United States	25,000	Hard	(United States) Danielle Lao	6–3, 6–1
Loss	2–2	Apr 2017	Charlottesville Open, US	60,000	Clay	(United States) Madison Brengle	4–6, 3–6
Win	3–2	Jul 2017	ITF Winnipeg, Canada	25,000	Hard	(Japan) Mayo Hibi	6–3, 6–4
Win	4–2	Apr 2018	ITF Indian Harbour Beach, US	60,000	Clay	(Romania) Irina Bara	6–4, 7–5
Loss	4–3	Apr 2019	ITF Pelham, United States	W25	Clay	(Czech Republic) Barbora Krejčíková	4–6, 3–6
Win	5–3	Aug 2019	Concord Open, US	W60	Hard	(United States) Ann Li	6–3, 7–5
Win	6–3	Oct 2019	Charleston Pro, US	W60	Clay	(United States) Grace Min	6–2, 6–7^{(5)}, 6–0
Win	7–3	Apr 2023	ITF Boca Raton, US	W25	Clay	(United States) Hailey Baptiste	6–4, 6–4
Win	8–3	May 2023	ITF Naples, US	W60	Clay	(Ukraine) Yulia Starodubtseva	7–5, 7–5
Loss	8–4	Aug 2023	Lexington Challenger, US	W60	Hard	(Mexico) Renata Zarazúa	6–1, 6–7^{(4)}, 5–7
Win	9–4	Jul 2026	Evansville Classic, US	W100	Hard	(South Korea) Ku Yeon-woo	7–6^{(3)}, 7–6^{(5)}
Win	10–4	Nov 2026	Tyler Pro Challenge, US	W100	Hard	(United States) Julieta Pareja	6–4, 6–3

=== Doubles: 13 (9 titles, 4 runner-ups) ===
Legend $100,000 tournaments (3–2) $80,000 tournaments (2–0) $60,000 tournaments (0–1) $25,000 tournaments (3–1) $10,000 tournaments (1–0)	Finals by surface Hard (5–3) Clay (3–1) Grass (1–0)

Result	W–L	Date	Tournament	Tier	Surface	Partner	Opponents	Score
Win	1–0	Jun 2016	ITF Buffalo, United States	10,000	Clay	(United States) Ingrid Neel	(United States) Sophie Chang (United States) Alexandra Mueller	5–7, 6–3, [10–6]
Loss	1–1	Feb 2017	Midland Tennis Classic, US	100,000	Hard (i)	(United States) Kayla Day	(United States) Ashley Weinhold (United States) Caitlin Whoriskey	6–7^{(1)}, 3–6
Win	2–1	Feb 2017	Rancho Santa Fe Open, US	25,000	Hard	(United States) Kayla Day	(Ukraine) Anhelina Kalinina (United States) Chiara Scholl	6–3, 1–6, [10–7]
Loss	2–2	Jul 2017	ITF Winnipeg, Canada	25,000	Hard	(Australia) Kimberly Birrell	(Japan) Hiroko Kuwata (Russia) Valeria Savinykh	4–6, 6–7^{(4)}
Win	3–2	Sep 2017	Abierto Tampico, Mexico	100,000	Hard	(Argentina) María Irigoyen	(United States) Kaitlyn Christian (Mexico) Giuliana Olmos	6–4, 6–4
Win	4–2	Apr 2019	ITF Pelham, US	W25	Clay	(United States) Usue Maitane Arconada	(Romania) Oana Georgeta Simion (Romania) Gabriela Talaba	6–3 6–0
Win	5–2	Apr 2019	Dothan Pro Classic, US	W80	Clay	(United States) Usue Maitane Arconada	(Australia) Destanee Aiava (Australia) Astra Sharma	7–6^{(5)}, 6–4
Loss	5–3	May 2019	Bonita Springs Championship, US	W100	Clay	(United States) Usue Maitane Arconada	(Chile) Alexa Guarachi (New Zealand) Erin Routliffe	3–6, 6–7^{(5)}
Win	6–3	Jun 2019	Surbiton Trophy, UK	W100	Grass	(United States) Jennifer Brady	(United Kingdom) Heather Watson (Belgium) Yanina Wickmayer	6–3, 6–4
Loss	6–4	July 2019	Championships of Honolulu, US	W60	Hard	(United States) Usue Maitane Arconada	(United States) Hayley Carter (United States) Jamie Loeb	4–6, 4–6
Win	7–4	Oct 2019	Tennis Classic of Macon, US	W80	Hard	(United States) Usue Maitane Arconada	(Australia) Jaimee Fourlis (Greece) Valentini Grammatikopoulou	6–7^{(2)}, 6–2, [10–8]
Win	8–4	Feb 2020	Midland Tennis Classic, US	W100	Hard (i)	(United States) Maria Sanchez	(Russia) Valeria Savinykh (Belgium) Yanina Wickmayer	6–3, 6–4
Win	9–4	Feb 2021	ITF Boca Raton, US	W25	Hard	(United States) Usue Maitane Arconada	(Colombia) Camila Osorio (Switzerland) Conny Perrin	6–3, 6–4

== Junior Grand Slam tournament finals ==
=== Doubles: 2 (runner-ups) ===
Result	Year	Tournament	Surface	Partner	Opponents	Score
Loss	2015	French Open	Clay	(United States) Katerina Stewart	(Czech Republic) Miriam Kolodziejová (Czech Republic) Markéta Vondroušová	0–6, 3–6
Loss	2016	US Open	Hard	(United States) Kayla Day	(United States) Jada Hart (United States) Ena Shibahara	6–4, 2–6, [11–13]
