= 2017 ITF Women's Circuit (October–December) =

Tennis tournament series

The 2017 ITF Women's Circuit is the 2017 edition of the second tier tour for women's professional tennis. It is organised by the International Tennis Federation and is a tier below the WTA Tour. The ITF Women's Circuit includes tournaments with prize money ranging from $15,000 up to $100,000.

== Key ==
Category
$100,000 tournaments
$80,000 tournaments
$60,000 tournaments
$25,000 tournaments
$15,000 tournaments

== Month ==
=== October ===
| Week of | Tournament | Winner | Runners-up | Semifinalists | Quarterfinalists |
|---|---|---|---|---|---|
| October 2 | Toowoomba, Australia; Hard $25,000; Singles and doubles draws | (Japan) Eri Hozumi; 7–5, 6–2 | (Australia) Astra Sharma | (Papua New Guinea) Abigail Tere-Apisah (Australia) Ellen Perez | (Ukraine) Marianna Zakarlyuk (Japan) Erika Sema (Australia) Alison Bai (Japan) Chihiro Muramatsu |
| October 2 | Toowoomba, Australia; Hard $25,000; Singles and doubles draws | (Japan) Momoko Kobori (Japan) Ayano Shimizu; 7–5, 7–5 | (Australia) Naiktha Bains (Papua New Guinea) Abigail Tere-Apisah | (Papua New Guinea) Abigail Tere-Apisah (Australia) Ellen Perez | (Ukraine) Marianna Zakarlyuk (Japan) Erika Sema (Australia) Alison Bai (Japan) Chihiro Muramatsu |
| October 2 | Pula, Italy; Clay $25,000; Singles and doubles draws | (United States) Chiara Scholl; 6–1, 4–6, 6–1 | (Slovakia) Michaela Hončová | (Liechtenstein) Kathinka von Deichmann (France) Alizé Lim | (Germany) Katharina Gerlach (Croatia) Tereza Mrdeža (Germany) Katharina Hobgarski (Argentina) Paula Ormaechea |
| October 2 | Pula, Italy; Clay $25,000; Singles and doubles draws | (Italy) Anastasia Grymalska (United States) Chiara Scholl; 4–6, 6–3, [13–11] | (Slovakia) Michaela Hončová (Japan) Akiko Omae | (Liechtenstein) Kathinka von Deichmann (France) Alizé Lim | (Germany) Katharina Gerlach (Croatia) Tereza Mrdeža (Germany) Katharina Hobgarski (Argentina) Paula Ormaechea |
| October 2 | Villa del Dique, Argentina; Clay $15,000; Singles and doubles draws | (Chile) Fernanda Brito; 6–3, 6–2 | (Argentina) Stephanie Mariel Petit | (Argentina) Jazmín Ortenzi (Argentina) Guillermina Naya | (Argentina) Eugenia Ganga (Argentina) Carla Lucero (Argentina) Melany Solange Krywoj (Paraguay) Camila Giangreco Campiz |
| October 2 | Villa del Dique, Argentina; Clay $15,000; Singles and doubles draws | (Chile) Fernanda Brito (Paraguay) Camila Giangreco Campiz; 6–3, 6–3 | (Ecuador) Mariana Correa (Brazil) Flávia Guimarães Bueno | (Argentina) Jazmín Ortenzi (Argentina) Guillermina Naya | (Argentina) Eugenia Ganga (Argentina) Carla Lucero (Argentina) Melany Solange Krywoj (Paraguay) Camila Giangreco Campiz |
| October 2 | Sozopol, Bulgaria; Hard $15,000; Singles and doubles draws | (Bulgaria) Gergana Topalova; 6–3, 2–6, 6–3 | (France) Léa Tholey | (Bulgaria) Julia Stamatova (Russia) Ekaterina Yashina | (Bulgaria) Dia Evtimova (Japan) Rio Kitagawa (Belarus) Anna Kubareva (Romania) Gabriela Duca |
| October 2 | Sozopol, Bulgaria; Hard $15,000; Singles and doubles draws | (Belgium) Michaela Boev (Bulgaria) Dia Evtimova; 6–2, 4–6, [16–14] | (Bulgaria) Julia Stamatova (France) Léa Tholey | (Bulgaria) Julia Stamatova (Russia) Ekaterina Yashina | (Bulgaria) Dia Evtimova (Japan) Rio Kitagawa (Belarus) Anna Kubareva (Romania) Gabriela Duca |
| October 2 | Sharm El Sheikh, Egypt; Hard $15,000; Singles and doubles draws | (Chinese Taipei) Lee Pei-chi; 6–0, 6–3 | (Switzerland) Arlinda Rushiti | (Slovenia) Kaja Juvan (India) Kanika Vaidya | (Serbia) Barbara Bonić (Romania) Ana Bianca Mihăilă (Chinese Taipei) Chen Pei-hsuan (Belgium) Britt Geukens |
| October 2 | Sharm El Sheikh, Egypt; Hard $15,000; Singles and doubles draws | (Australia) Jelena Stojanovic (Australia) Alexandra Walters; 6–3, 6–1 | (Guatemala) Melissa Morales (Guatemala) Andrea Weedon | (Slovenia) Kaja Juvan (India) Kanika Vaidya | (Serbia) Barbara Bonić (Romania) Ana Bianca Mihăilă (Chinese Taipei) Chen Pei-hsuan (Belgium) Britt Geukens |
| October 2 | Jounieh, Lebanon; Clay $15,000; Singles and doubles draws | (Serbia) Draginja Vuković; 3–6, 6–3, 7–5 | (Russia) Anna Ureke | (Sweden) Jacqueline Cabaj Awad (Serbia) Bojana Marinković | (Hungary) Naomi Totka (Russia) Victoria Kan (Germany) Lisa-Marie Mätschke (Russia) Vasilisa Aponasenko |
| October 2 | Jounieh, Lebanon; Clay $15,000; Singles and doubles draws | (Russia) Victoria Kan (Russia) Maria Zotova; 6–0, 6–1 | (Hungary) Naomi Totka (Serbia) Draginja Vuković | (Sweden) Jacqueline Cabaj Awad (Serbia) Bojana Marinković | (Hungary) Naomi Totka (Russia) Victoria Kan (Germany) Lisa-Marie Mätschke (Russia) Vasilisa Aponasenko |
| October 2 | Lisbon, Portugal; Hard $15,000; Singles and doubles draws | (Spain) Nuria Párrizas Díaz; 2–6, 7–5, 7–5 | (Germany) Romy Kölzer | (Portugal) Maria João Koehler (Czech Republic) Karolína Beránková | (Spain) María José Luque Moreno (Italy) Maria Masini (India) Nandini Sharma (Portugal) Francisca Jorge |
| October 2 | Lisbon, Portugal; Hard $15,000; Singles and doubles draws | (Spain) Alba Carrillo Marín (Portugal) Inês Murta; 4–6, 6–1, [10–4] | (Czech Republic) Karolína Beránková (Hungary) Adrienn Nagy | (Portugal) Maria João Koehler (Czech Republic) Karolína Beránková | (Spain) María José Luque Moreno (Italy) Maria Masini (India) Nandini Sharma (Portugal) Francisca Jorge |
| October 2 | Telde, Spain; Clay $15,000; Singles and doubles draws | (Spain) Guiomar Maristany; 7–5, 4–6, 6–4 | (Switzerland) Lisa Sabino | (Spain) Meritxell Perera Ros (Spain) Ángela Fita Boluda | (Spain) Alicia Herrero Liñana (Netherlands) Chayenne Ewijk (Spain) Arabela Fernández Rabener (Spain) Ana Lantigua de la Nuez |
| October 2 | Telde, Spain; Clay $15,000; Singles and doubles draws | (Netherlands) Chayenne Ewijk (Switzerland) Lisa Sabino; 6–1, 6–1 | (Peru) Anastasia Iamachkine (Spain) Ana Lantigua de la Nuez | (Spain) Meritxell Perera Ros (Spain) Ángela Fita Boluda | (Spain) Alicia Herrero Liñana (Netherlands) Chayenne Ewijk (Spain) Arabela Fernández Rabener (Spain) Ana Lantigua de la Nuez |
| October 2 | Colombo, Sri Lanka; Clay $15,000; Singles and doubles draws | (India) Riya Bhatia; 7–6^{(7–2)}, 6–1 | (France) Joséphine Boualem | (United Kingdom) Alice Gillan (Serbia) Tamara Čurović | (United States) Rushri Wijesundera (China) Ma Yexin (India) Jennifer Luikham (India) Nidhi Chilumula |
| October 2 | Colombo, Sri Lanka; Clay $15,000; Singles and doubles draws | (Canada) Isabelle Boulais (China) Ma Yexin; 6–3, 2–6, [10–5] | (France) Joséphine Boualem (Cambodia) Andrea Ka | (United Kingdom) Alice Gillan (Serbia) Tamara Čurović | (United States) Rushri Wijesundera (China) Ma Yexin (India) Jennifer Luikham (India) Nidhi Chilumula |
| October 2 | Nonthaburi, Thailand; Hard $15,000; Singles and doubles draws | (South Korea) Choi Ji-hee; 6–2, 6–3 | (Switzerland) Lulu Sun | (Thailand) Patcharin Cheapchandej (Chinese Taipei) Chan Chin-wei | (Switzerland) Valentina Ryser (Serbia) Natalija Kostić (China) Zheng Wushuang (Hong Kong) Zhang Ling |
| October 2 | Nonthaburi, Thailand; Hard $15,000; Singles and doubles draws | (Thailand) Nudnida Luangnam (Thailand) Varunya Wongteanchai; 6–4, 6–4 | (Malta) Elaine Genovese (Finland) Oona Orpana | (Thailand) Patcharin Cheapchandej (Chinese Taipei) Chan Chin-wei | (Switzerland) Valentina Ryser (Serbia) Natalija Kostić (China) Zheng Wushuang (Hong Kong) Zhang Ling |
| October 2 | Hammamet, Tunisia; Clay $15,000; Singles and doubles draws | (Bulgaria) Isabella Shinikova; 6–1, 6–2 | (Japan) Satsuki Takamura | (Italy) Lucrezia Stefanini (Belgium) Marie Benoît | (France) Valentine Bacher (Italy) Federica Arcidiacono (Italy) Benedetta Ivaldi (Italy) Verena Hofer |
| October 2 | Hammamet, Tunisia; Clay $15,000; Singles and doubles draws | Doubles competition cancelled due to bad weather | | (Italy) Lucrezia Stefanini (Belgium) Marie Benoît | (France) Valentine Bacher (Italy) Federica Arcidiacono (Italy) Benedetta Ivaldi (Italy) Verena Hofer |
| October 2 | Antalya, Turkey; Clay $15,000; Singles and doubles draws | (Romania) Georgia Crăciun; 6–3, 6–4 | (Ukraine) Sofiya Kovalets | (Czech Republic) Gabriela Pantůčková (Brazil) Carolina Alves | (Switzerland) Chiara Grimm (Brazil) Rebeca Pereira (Croatia) Ana Biškić (Czech Republic) Gabriela Horáčková |
| October 2 | Antalya, Turkey; Clay $15,000; Singles and doubles draws | (Uzbekistan) Albina Khabibulina (Turkey) İpek Oz; 7–5, 1–6, [11–9] | (Hungary) Réka Luca Jani (Ukraine) Sofiya Kovalets | (Czech Republic) Gabriela Pantůčková (Brazil) Carolina Alves | (Switzerland) Chiara Grimm (Brazil) Rebeca Pereira (Croatia) Ana Biškić (Czech Republic) Gabriela Horáčková |
| October 2 | Hilton Head Island, United States; Clay $15,000; Singles and doubles draws | (Norway) Ulrikke Eikeri; 6–4, 6–1 | (Italy) Bianca Turati | (Italy) Anna Turati (United States) Ann Li | (United States) Sofia Sewing (Brazil) Laura Pigossi (Paraguay) Montserrat González (Canada) Petra Januskova |
| October 2 | Hilton Head Island, United States; Clay $15,000; Singles and doubles draws | (United Kingdom) Emily Appleton (United States) Caty McNally; 7–5, 6–3 | (United States) Kylie Collins (United States) Meg Kowalski | (Italy) Anna Turati (United States) Ann Li | (United States) Sofia Sewing (Brazil) Laura Pigossi (Paraguay) Montserrat González (Canada) Petra Januskova |
| October 9 | Cairns, Australia; Hard $25,000; Singles and doubles draws | (Australia) Olivia Rogowska; 1–6, 6–2, 6–2 | (Papua New Guinea) Abigail Tere-Apisah | (Japan) Erika Sema (United States) Yuki Kristina Chiang | (Japan) Ramu Ueda (Australia) Naiktha Bains (Japan) Yuuki Tanaka (Australia) Ellen Perez |
| October 9 | Cairns, Australia; Hard $25,000; Singles and doubles draws | (Australia) Naiktha Bains (Papua New Guinea) Abigail Tere-Apisah; 4–6, 6–2, [10–6] | (Australia) Astra Sharma (Australia) Belinda Woolcock | (Japan) Erika Sema (United States) Yuki Kristina Chiang | (Japan) Ramu Ueda (Australia) Naiktha Bains (Japan) Yuuki Tanaka (Australia) Ellen Perez |
| October 9 | Cherbourg-en-Cotentin, France; Hard (indoor) $25,000; Singles and doubles draws | (France) Myrtille Georges; 6–4, 3–6, 7–5 | (France) Audrey Albié | (Switzerland) Tess Sugnaux (France) Julie Gervais | (Russia) Olesya Pervushina (United Kingdom) Sarah Beth Grey (United Kingdom) Samantha Murray (Belgium) Ysaline Bonaventure |
| October 9 | Cherbourg-en-Cotentin, France; Hard (indoor) $25,000; Singles and doubles draws | (France) Manon Arcangioli (France) Shérazad Reix; 3–1, ret. | (United Kingdom) Samantha Murray (India) Karman Kaur Thandi | (Switzerland) Tess Sugnaux (France) Julie Gervais | (Russia) Olesya Pervushina (United Kingdom) Sarah Beth Grey (United Kingdom) Samantha Murray (Belgium) Ysaline Bonaventure |
| October 9 | Pula, Italy; Clay $25,000; Singles and doubles draws | (Slovenia) Polona Hercog; 6–1, 6–0 | (Russia) Valentyna Ivakhnenko | (United States) Chiara Scholl (Croatia) Tereza Mrdeža | (Ukraine) Anastasiya Vasylyeva (Italy) Anastasia Grymalska (Italy) Giulia Gatto-Monticone (Czech Republic) Anastasia Zarycká |
| October 9 | Pula, Italy; Clay $25,000; Singles and doubles draws | (Romania) Elena Bogdan (Russia) Valeriya Solovyeva; 7–6^{(9–7)}, 5–7, [11–9] | (Croatia) Tereza Mrdeža (Japan) Akiko Omae | (United States) Chiara Scholl (Croatia) Tereza Mrdeža | (Ukraine) Anastasiya Vasylyeva (Italy) Anastasia Grymalska (Italy) Giulia Gatto-Monticone (Czech Republic) Anastasia Zarycká |
| October 9 | Makinohara, Japan; Carpet $25,000; Singles and doubles draws | (Japan) Ayano Shimizu; 6–3, 6–3 | (Japan) Momoko Kobori | (Japan) Shiho Akita (Japan) Miyabi Inoue | (United States) Naomi Cheong (Japan) Chihiro Muramatsu (Japan) Haruka Kaji (Japan) Kisa Yoshioka |
| October 9 | Makinohara, Japan; Carpet $25,000; Singles and doubles draws | (Japan) Miyabi Inoue (Japan) Kotomi Takahata; 6–3, 7–5 | (Japan) Yukina Saigo (Japan) Ayano Shimizu | (Japan) Shiho Akita (Japan) Miyabi Inoue | (United States) Naomi Cheong (Japan) Chihiro Muramatsu (Japan) Haruka Kaji (Japan) Kisa Yoshioka |
| October 9 | Lagos, Nigeria; Hard $25,000; Singles and doubles draws | (Israel) Deniz Khazaniuk; 4–6, 6–1, 6–3 | (Switzerland) Conny Perrin | (Mexico) Ana Sofía Sánchez (Turkey) Ayla Aksu | (France) Harmony Tan (Montenegro) Ana Veselinović (Austria) Melanie Klaffner (France) Estelle Cascino |
| October 9 | Lagos, Nigeria; Hard $25,000; Singles and doubles draws | (Turkey) Ayla Aksu (Montenegro) Ana Veselinović; 6–4, 6–2 | (Switzerland) Conny Perrin (Ukraine) Valeriya Strakhova | (Mexico) Ana Sofía Sánchez (Turkey) Ayla Aksu | (France) Harmony Tan (Montenegro) Ana Veselinović (Austria) Melanie Klaffner (France) Estelle Cascino |
| October 9 | Óbidos, Portugal; Carpet $25,000; Singles and doubles draws | (Russia) Irina Khromacheva; 6–1, 4–6, 6–4 | (Poland) Magdalena Fręch | (Russia) Veronika Kudermetova (Italy) Georgia Brescia | (Switzerland) Simona Waltert (United Kingdom) Katie Swan (Serbia) Olga Danilović (Spain) María Teresa Torró Flor |
| October 9 | Óbidos, Portugal; Carpet $25,000; Singles and doubles draws | (Bulgaria) Elitsa Kostova (Russia) Yana Sizikova; Walkover | (Italy) Georgia Brescia (Italy) Alice Matteucci | (Russia) Veronika Kudermetova (Italy) Georgia Brescia | (Switzerland) Simona Waltert (United Kingdom) Katie Swan (Serbia) Olga Danilović (Spain) María Teresa Torró Flor |
| October 9 | Seville, Spain; Clay $25,000; Singles and doubles draws | (Chile) Daniela Seguel; 2–6, 6–1, 6–2 | (Belgium) Marie Benoît | (Slovakia) Vivien Juhászová (Spain) Estrella Cabeza Candela | (Hungary) Panna Udvardy (Spain) Paula Badosa Gibert (Czech Republic) Monika Kilnarová (Brazil) Luisa Stefani |
| October 9 | Seville, Spain; Clay $25,000; Singles and doubles draws | (Brazil) Luisa Stefani (Mexico) Renata Zarazúa; 7–6^{(7–2)}, 7–6^{(7–3)} | (Spain) Estrella Cabeza Candela (Venezuela) Andrea Gámiz | (Slovakia) Vivien Juhászová (Spain) Estrella Cabeza Candela | (Hungary) Panna Udvardy (Spain) Paula Badosa Gibert (Czech Republic) Monika Kilnarová (Brazil) Luisa Stefani |
| October 9 | Sumter, United States; Hard $25,000; Singles and doubles draws | (United States) Taylor Townsend; 6–2, 6–1 | (Norway) Ulrikke Eikeri | (Russia) Marta Paigina (United States) Anna Tatishvili | (United States) Jessica Pegula (Paraguay) Montserrat González (Mexico) Victoria Rodríguez (Serbia) Jovana Jakšić |
| October 9 | Sumter, United States; Hard $25,000; Singles and doubles draws | (United States) Jessica Pegula (United States) Taylor Townsend; 4–6, 7–5, [10–5] | (United States) Alexandra Mueller (United States) Caitlin Whoriskey | (Russia) Marta Paigina (United States) Anna Tatishvili | (United States) Jessica Pegula (Paraguay) Montserrat González (Mexico) Victoria Rodríguez (Serbia) Jovana Jakšić |
| October 9 | Buenos Aires, Argentina; Clay $15,000; Singles and doubles draws | (Chile) Fernanda Brito; 1–6, 7–5, 7–5 | (Brazil) Thaisa Grana Pedretti | (Argentina) Stephanie Mariel Petit (Paraguay) Camila Giangreco Campiz | (Argentina) María del Rosario Vázquez (Chile) Ivania Martinich (Argentina) Ana Geller (Chile) Bárbara Gatica |
| October 9 | Buenos Aires, Argentina; Clay $15,000; Singles and doubles draws | (Chile) Fernanda Brito (Paraguay) Camila Giangreco Campiz; 7–5, 0–6, [10–5] | (Chile) Bárbara Gatica (Argentina) Guillermina Naya | (Argentina) Stephanie Mariel Petit (Paraguay) Camila Giangreco Campiz | (Argentina) María del Rosario Vázquez (Chile) Ivania Martinich (Argentina) Ana Geller (Chile) Bárbara Gatica |
| October 9 | Sharm El Sheikh, Egypt; Hard $15,000; Singles and doubles draws | (Slovakia) Tereza Mihalíková; 6–2, 6–4 | (Slovenia) Nastja Kolar | (Switzerland) Nina Stadler (United Kingdom) Jodie Anna Burrage | (India) Kanika Vaidya (Switzerland) Susan Bandecchi (Guatemala) Andrea Weedon (Egypt) Sandra Samir |
| October 9 | Sharm El Sheikh, Egypt; Hard $15,000; Singles and doubles draws | (Netherlands) Nina Kruijer (Netherlands) Suzan Lamens; 3–6, 7–5, [10–8] | (Serbia) Barbara Bonić (Slovenia) Nastja Kolar | (Switzerland) Nina Stadler (United Kingdom) Jodie Anna Burrage | (India) Kanika Vaidya (Switzerland) Susan Bandecchi (Guatemala) Andrea Weedon (Egypt) Sandra Samir |
| October 9 | Colombo, Sri Lanka; Clay $15,000; Singles and doubles draws | (China) Ma Yexin; 6–1, 6–2 | (India) Prerna Bhambri | (Indonesia) Aldila Sutjiadi (India) Rishika Sunkara | (Kazakhstan) Gozal Ainitdinova (India) Rutuja Bhosale (Serbia) Tamara Čurović (Canada) Isabelle Boulais |
| October 9 | Colombo, Sri Lanka; Clay $15,000; Singles and doubles draws | Doubles competition cancelled due to bad weather | | (Indonesia) Aldila Sutjiadi (India) Rishika Sunkara | (Kazakhstan) Gozal Ainitdinova (India) Rutuja Bhosale (Serbia) Tamara Čurović (Canada) Isabelle Boulais |
| October 9 | Nonthaburi, Thailand; Hard $15,000; Singles and doubles draws | (Thailand) Patcharin Cheapchandej; 7–6^{(7–2)}, 6–0 | (Chinese Taipei) Liang En-shuo | (Thailand) Thasaporn Naklo (Thailand) Bunyawi Thamchaiwat | (Thailand) Nudnida Luangnam (Japan) Mana Ayukawa (Sweden) Mirjam Björklund (Thailand) Chompoothip Jundakate |
| October 9 | Nonthaburi, Thailand; Hard $15,000; Singles and doubles draws | (Chinese Taipei) Chan Chin-wei (Chinese Taipei) Liang En-shuo; 6–1, 6–4 | (Thailand) Nudnida Luangnam (Thailand) Varunya Wongteanchai | (Thailand) Thasaporn Naklo (Thailand) Bunyawi Thamchaiwat | (Thailand) Nudnida Luangnam (Japan) Mana Ayukawa (Sweden) Mirjam Björklund (Thailand) Chompoothip Jundakate |
| October 9 | Hammamet, Tunisia; Clay $15,000; Singles and doubles draws | (Oman) Fatma Al-Nabhani; 6–3, 6–1 | (Bulgaria) Isabella Shinikova | (Italy) Federica Arcidiacono (France) Marine Partaud | (Italy) Natasha Piludu (Croatia) Lea Bošković (Italy) Beatrice Lombardo (Germany) Katharina Hering |
| October 9 | Hammamet, Tunisia; Clay $15,000; Singles and doubles draws | (Croatia) Lea Bošković (France) Yasmine Mansouri; 1–6, 6–4, [10–6] | (Croatia) Mariana Dražić (Bulgaria) Isabella Shinikova | (Italy) Federica Arcidiacono (France) Marine Partaud | (Italy) Natasha Piludu (Croatia) Lea Bošković (Italy) Beatrice Lombardo (Germany) Katharina Hering |
| October 9 | Antalya, Turkey; Clay $15,000; Singles and doubles draws | (Turkey) İpek Öz; 6–3, 6–2 | (Romania) Ilona Georgiana Ghioroaie | (Brazil) Carolina Alves (Russia) Polina Bakhmutkina | (Slovakia) Viktória Morvayová (Italy) Isabella Tcherkes Zade (Belarus) Katyarina Paulenka (United States) Dasha Ivanova |
| October 9 | Antalya, Turkey; Clay $15,000; Singles and doubles draws | (Russia) Daria Nazarkina (Russia) Ekaterina Vishnevskaya; 6–2, 6–2 | (Czech Republic) Gabriela Horáčková (Bulgaria) Ani Vangelova | (Brazil) Carolina Alves (Russia) Polina Bakhmutkina | (Slovakia) Viktória Morvayová (Italy) Isabella Tcherkes Zade (Belarus) Katyarina Paulenka (United States) Dasha Ivanova |
| October 16 | Suzhou Ladies Open; Suzhou, China; Hard $60,000; Singles – Doubles | (Italy) Sara Errani; 6–1, 6–0 | (China) Guo Hanyu | (Serbia) Nina Stojanović (Japan) Kurumi Nara | (Japan) Nao Hibino (Australia) Lizette Cabrera (China) Zhang Yuxuan (China) Lu Jingjing |
| October 16 | Suzhou Ladies Open; Suzhou, China; Hard $60,000; Singles – Doubles | (United States) Jacqueline Cako (Serbia) Nina Stojanović; 2–6, 7–5, [10–2] | (Japan) Eri Hozumi (Japan) Miyu Kato | (Serbia) Nina Stojanović (Japan) Kurumi Nara | (Japan) Nao Hibino (Australia) Lizette Cabrera (China) Zhang Yuxuan (China) Lu Jingjing |
| October 16 | Open de Touraine; Joué-lès-Tours, France; Hard (indoor) $25,000; Singles and doubles draws | (Czech Republic) Tereza Smitková; 6–3, 7–5 | (France) Myrtille Georges | (Ukraine) Katarina Zavatska (Romania) Elena-Gabriela Ruse | (France) Julie Gervais (Germany) Anna Zaja (France) Chloé Paquet (Japan) Mari Osaka |
| October 16 | Open de Touraine; Joué-lès-Tours, France; Hard (indoor) $25,000; Singles and doubles draws | (United Kingdom) Sarah Beth Grey (United Kingdom) Samantha Murray; 7–6^{(7–3)}, 6–3 | (Romania) Jaqueline Cristian (Romania) Elena-Gabriela Ruse | (Ukraine) Katarina Zavatska (Romania) Elena-Gabriela Ruse | (France) Julie Gervais (Germany) Anna Zaja (France) Chloé Paquet (Japan) Mari Osaka |
| October 16 | Pula, Italy; Clay $25,000; Singles and doubles draws | (Slovenia) Polona Hercog; 6–4, 6–1 | (Mexico) Renata Zarazúa | (Russia) Valentyna Ivakhnenko (Italy) Giulia Gatto-Monticone | (Russia) Amina Anshba (France) Alizé Lim (Netherlands) Cindy Burger (Croatia) Tereza Mrdeža |
| October 16 | Pula, Italy; Clay $25,000; Singles and doubles draws | (Ukraine) Ganna Poznikhirenko (Bosnia and Herzegovina) Jasmina Tinjić; 6–4, 6–3 | (Germany) Tayisiya Morderger (Germany) Yana Morderger | (Russia) Valentyna Ivakhnenko (Italy) Giulia Gatto-Monticone | (Russia) Amina Anshba (France) Alizé Lim (Netherlands) Cindy Burger (Croatia) Tereza Mrdeža |
| October 16 | Hamamatsu, Japan; Carpet $25,000; Singles and doubles draws | (China) Lu Jiajing; 6–3, 6–3 | (Japan) Miyabi Inoue | (Japan) Ayano Shimizu (United States) Naomi Cheong | (Australia) Olivia Tjandramulia (Japan) Mitsumi Kawasaki (Japan) Chihiro Muramatsu (Japan) Junri Namigata |
| October 16 | Hamamatsu, Japan; Carpet $25,000; Singles and doubles draws | (Japan) Rika Fujiwara (Japan) Kyōka Okamura; 6–2, 6–4 | (China) Lu Jiajing (Japan) Ayaka Okuno | (Japan) Ayano Shimizu (United States) Naomi Cheong | (Australia) Olivia Tjandramulia (Japan) Mitsumi Kawasaki (Japan) Chihiro Muramatsu (Japan) Junri Namigata |
| October 16 | Lagos, Nigeria; Hard $25,000; Singles and doubles draws | (Switzerland) Conny Perrin; 7–6^{(13–11)}, 6–3 | (Israel) Deniz Khazaniuk | (France) Estelle Cascino (Turkey) Ayla Aksu | (Mexico) Ana Sofía Sánchez (Slovenia) Tadeja Majerič (France) Clothilde de Bernardi (Ukraine) Valeriya Strakhova |
| October 16 | Lagos, Nigeria; Hard $25,000; Singles and doubles draws | (Switzerland) Conny Perrin (Ukraine) Valeriya Strakhova; 6–1, 6–2 | (Slovenia) Tadeja Majerič (United Kingdom) Tiffany William | (France) Estelle Cascino (Turkey) Ayla Aksu | (Mexico) Ana Sofía Sánchez (Slovenia) Tadeja Majerič (France) Clothilde de Bernardi (Ukraine) Valeriya Strakhova |
| October 16 | Óbidos, Portugal; Carpet $25,000; Singles and doubles draws | (Russia) Anna Kalinskaya; 6–3, 6–3 | (Poland) Magdalena Fręch | (United Kingdom) Katie Boulter (Russia) Veronika Kudermetova | (Slovakia) Viktória Kužmová (Portugal) Inês Murta (Russia) Marina Melnikova (United Kingdom) Katie Swan |
| October 16 | Óbidos, Portugal; Carpet $25,000; Singles and doubles draws | (Russia) Olga Doroshina (Russia) Yana Sizikova; 6–2, 6–2 | (Turkey) Berfu Cengiz (United Kingdom) Katie Swan | (United Kingdom) Katie Boulter (Russia) Veronika Kudermetova | (Slovakia) Viktória Kužmová (Portugal) Inês Murta (Russia) Marina Melnikova (United Kingdom) Katie Swan |
| October 16 | Florence, United States; Hard $25,000; Singles and doubles draws | (United States) Taylor Townsend; 6–1, 7–5 | (Belgium) Ysaline Bonaventure | (United States) Danielle Collins (Sweden) Rebecca Peterson | (Mexico) Victoria Rodríguez (Switzerland) Amra Sadiković (Norway) Ulrikke Eikeri (United States) Francesca Di Lorenzo |
| October 16 | Florence, United States; Hard $25,000; Singles and doubles draws | (United States) Maria Sanchez (United States) Taylor Townsend; 6–1, 6–2 | (United Kingdom) Tara Moore (Switzerland) Amra Sadiković | (United States) Danielle Collins (Sweden) Rebecca Peterson | (Mexico) Victoria Rodríguez (Switzerland) Amra Sadiković (Norway) Ulrikke Eikeri (United States) Francesca Di Lorenzo |
| October 16 | Sharm El Sheikh, Egypt; Hard $15,000; Singles and doubles draws | (Egypt) Sandra Samir; 1–6, 6–1, 6–1 | (Russia) Anastasia Pribylova | (Denmark) Emilie Francati (Slovakia) Tereza Mihalíková | (India) Kanika Vaidya (Netherlands) Suzan Lamens (Poland) Paulina Jastrzębska (Russia) Valeriya Zeleva |
| October 16 | Sharm El Sheikh, Egypt; Hard $15,000; Singles and doubles draws | (Denmark) Emilie Francati (India) Kanika Vaidya; 3–6, 7–5, [10–7] | (Austria) Caroline Ilowska (Slovenia) Nastja Kolar | (Denmark) Emilie Francati (Slovakia) Tereza Mihalíková | (India) Kanika Vaidya (Netherlands) Suzan Lamens (Poland) Paulina Jastrzębska (Russia) Valeriya Zeleva |
| October 16 | Riba-roja de Túria, Spain; Clay $15,000; Singles and doubles draws | (Australia) Isabelle Wallace; 6–3, 6–3 | (Switzerland) Rebeka Masarova | (Spain) Estrella Cabeza Candela (Australia) Seone Mendez | (Spain) Marina Bassols Ribera (Spain) Guiomar Maristany (Italy) Martina Spigarelli (Spain) Yvonne Cavallé Reimers |
| October 16 | Riba-roja de Túria, Spain; Clay $15,000; Singles and doubles draws | (Spain) Yvonne Cavallé Reimers (Argentina) Guadalupe Pérez Rojas; 6–4, 6–4 | (Spain) Estrella Cabeza Candela (Spain) Ángela Fita Boluda | (Spain) Estrella Cabeza Candela (Australia) Seone Mendez | (Spain) Marina Bassols Ribera (Spain) Guiomar Maristany (Italy) Martina Spigarelli (Spain) Yvonne Cavallé Reimers |
| October 16 | Colombo, Sri Lanka; Clay $15,000; Singles and doubles draws | (Kazakhstan) Gozal Ainitdinova; 7–5, 6–4 | (India) Pranjala Yadlapalli | (Indonesia) Aldila Sutjiadi (France) Joséphine Boualem | (India) Jennifer Luikham (China) Ma Yexin (Serbia) Tamara Čurović (India) Zeel Desai |
| October 16 | Colombo, Sri Lanka; Clay $15,000; Singles and doubles draws | (India) Rutuja Bhosale (India) Pranjala Yadlapalli; 6–4, 6–1 | (India) Natasha Palha (India) Rishika Sunkara | (Indonesia) Aldila Sutjiadi (France) Joséphine Boualem | (India) Jennifer Luikham (China) Ma Yexin (Serbia) Tamara Čurović (India) Zeel Desai |
| October 16 | Hammamet, Tunisia; Clay $15,000; Singles and doubles draws | (Italy) Michele Alexandra Zmău; 4–6, 6–3, 7–6^{(7–4)} | (Finland) Mia Eklund | (Bulgaria) Isabella Shinikova (France) Caroline Roméo | (France) Yasmine Mansouri (Belgium) Catherine Chantraine (Romania) Denise-Antonela Stoica (Croatia) Mariana Dražić |
| October 16 | Hammamet, Tunisia; Clay $15,000; Singles and doubles draws | (Finland) Mia Eklund (Germany) Julyette Steur; 6–4, 4–6, [10–7] | (France) Loudmilla Bencheikh (France) Yasmine Mansouri | (Bulgaria) Isabella Shinikova (France) Caroline Roméo | (France) Yasmine Mansouri (Belgium) Catherine Chantraine (Romania) Denise-Antonela Stoica (Croatia) Mariana Dražić |
| October 16 | Antalya, Turkey; Clay $15,000; Singles and doubles draws | (Romania) Ilona Georgiana Ghioroaie; 6–3, 6–0 | (Czech Republic) Gabriela Horáčková | (Czech Republic) Magdaléna Pantůčková (Russia) Ekaterina Vishnevskaya | (Serbia) Tijana Spasojević (Italy) Federica Prati (Slovakia) Viktória Morvayová (Moldova) Vitalia Stamat |
| October 16 | Antalya, Turkey; Clay $15,000; Singles and doubles draws | (Slovakia) Viktória Morvayová (Slovenia) Nika Radišič; 6–4, 6–4 | (Romania) Cristina Adamescu (Romania) Ilona Georgiana Ghioroaie | (Czech Republic) Magdaléna Pantůčková (Russia) Ekaterina Vishnevskaya | (Serbia) Tijana Spasojević (Italy) Federica Prati (Slovakia) Viktória Morvayová (Moldova) Vitalia Stamat |
| October 23 | Internationaux Féminins de la Vienne; Poitiers, France; Hard (indoor) $100,000; Singles – Doubles | (Romania) Mihaela Buzărnescu; 6–4, 6–2 | (Belgium) Alison Van Uytvanck | (Germany) Tatjana Maria (Switzerland) Belinda Bencic | (Serbia) Ivana Jorović (Russia) Ekaterina Alexandrova (United States) Bernarda Pera (Belgium) Yanina Wickmayer |
| October 23 | Internationaux Féminins de la Vienne; Poitiers, France; Hard (indoor) $100,000; Singles – Doubles | (Switzerland) Belinda Bencic (Belgium) Yanina Wickmayer; 7–6^{(9–7)}, 6–3 | (Romania) Mihaela Buzărnescu (Germany) Nicola Geuer | (Germany) Tatjana Maria (Switzerland) Belinda Bencic | (Serbia) Ivana Jorović (Russia) Ekaterina Alexandrova (United States) Bernarda Pera (Belgium) Yanina Wickmayer |
| October 23 | Tennis Classic of Macon; Macon, United States; Hard $80,000; Singles – Doubles | (Slovakia) Anna Karolína Schmiedlová; 6–4, 6–1 | (United States) Victoria Duval | (Sweden) Rebecca Peterson (United States) Kayla Day | (Bulgaria) Sesil Karatantcheva (Switzerland) Stefanie Vögele (Croatia) Ajla Tomljanović (United States) Jamie Loeb |
| October 23 | Tennis Classic of Macon; Macon, United States; Hard $80,000; Singles – Doubles | (United States) Kaitlyn Christian (United States) Sabrina Santamaria; 6–1, 6–0 | (Brazil) Paula Cristina Gonçalves (United States) Sanaz Marand | (Sweden) Rebecca Peterson (United States) Kayla Day | (Bulgaria) Sesil Karatantcheva (Switzerland) Stefanie Vögele (Croatia) Ajla Tomljanović (United States) Jamie Loeb |
| October 23 | Challenger de Saguenay; Saguenay, Canada; Hard (indoor) $60,000; Singles – Doubles | (Hungary) Gréta Arn; 6–1, 6–2 | (Netherlands) Bibiane Schoofs | (France) Jessika Ponchet (China) Xu Shilin | (United States) Francesca Di Lorenzo (Canada) Charlotte Robillard-Millette (Canada) Carol Zhao (Canada) Leylah Annie Fernandez |
| October 23 | Challenger de Saguenay; Saguenay, Canada; Hard (indoor) $60,000; Singles – Doubles | (Canada) Bianca Andreescu (Canada) Carol Zhao; Walkover | (United States) Francesca Di Lorenzo (New Zealand) Erin Routliffe | (France) Jessika Ponchet (China) Xu Shilin | (United States) Francesca Di Lorenzo (Canada) Charlotte Robillard-Millette (Canada) Carol Zhao (Canada) Leylah Annie Fernandez |
| October 23 | Bank of Liuzhou Cup; Liuzhou, China; Hard $60,000; Singles – Doubles | (China) Wang Yafan; 3–6, 6–4, 3–3, ret. | (Japan) Nao Hibino | (China) Han Xinyun (China) You Xiaodi | (Japan) Hiroko Kuwata (Japan) Riko Sawayanagi (China) Zhu Lin (China) Zhang Yuxuan |
| October 23 | Bank of Liuzhou Cup; Liuzhou, China; Hard $60,000; Singles – Doubles | (China) Han Xinyun (Japan) Makoto Ninomiya; 6–2, 7–6^{(7–3)} | (United States) Jacqueline Cako (United Kingdom) Laura Robson | (China) Han Xinyun (China) You Xiaodi | (Japan) Hiroko Kuwata (Japan) Riko Sawayanagi (China) Zhu Lin (China) Zhang Yuxuan |
| October 23 | Pula, Italy; Clay $25,000; Singles and doubles draws | (Italy) Jessica Pieri; 6–4, 6–1 | (Austria) Julia Grabher | (Croatia) Tena Lukas (France) Sara Cakarevic | (Slovenia) Polona Hercog (Ukraine) Ganna Poznikhirenko (Russia) Valeriya Solovyeva (Italy) Anastasia Grymalska |
| October 23 | Pula, Italy; Clay $25,000; Singles and doubles draws | (Romania) Cristina Dinu (Italy) Camilla Rosatello; 6–2, 6–1 | (Romania) Elena Bogdan (Bosnia and Herzegovina) Anita Husarić | (Croatia) Tena Lukas (France) Sara Cakarevic | (Slovenia) Polona Hercog (Ukraine) Ganna Poznikhirenko (Russia) Valeriya Solovyeva (Italy) Anastasia Grymalska |
| October 23 | Óbidos, Portugal; Carpet $25,000; Singles and doubles draws | (United Kingdom) Katie Swan; 5–0, ret. | (United Kingdom) Katie Boulter | (Slovakia) Viktória Kužmová (Russia) Anna Kalinskaya | (Russia) Marina Melnikova (Russia) Anastasia Pivovarova (Croatia) Ani Mijačika (Hungary) Dalma Gálfi |
| October 23 | Óbidos, Portugal; Carpet $25,000; Singles and doubles draws | (Russia) Olga Doroshina (Russia) Yana Sizikova; 6–0, 6–2 | (Belarus) Lizaveta Hancharova (Italy) Dalila Spiteri | (Slovakia) Viktória Kužmová (Russia) Anna Kalinskaya | (Russia) Marina Melnikova (Russia) Anastasia Pivovarova (Croatia) Ani Mijačika (Hungary) Dalma Gálfi |
| October 23 | Istanbul, Turkey; Hard (indoor) $25,000; Singles and doubles draws | (Russia) Vitalia Diatchenko; 6–3, 6–1 | (Romania) Jaqueline Cristian | (Austria) Barbara Haas (Ukraine) Olga Ianchuk | (Serbia) Dejana Radanović (Russia) Viktoria Kamenskaya (Russia) Polina Golubovskaya (Romania) Raluca Georgiana Șerban |
| October 23 | Istanbul, Turkey; Hard (indoor) $25,000; Singles and doubles draws | (Czech Republic) Petra Krejsová (Czech Republic) Jesika Malečková; 6–4, 6–3 | (Turkey) İpek Öz (Russia) Ekaterina Yashina | (Austria) Barbara Haas (Ukraine) Olga Ianchuk | (Serbia) Dejana Radanović (Russia) Viktoria Kamenskaya (Russia) Polina Golubovskaya (Romania) Raluca Georgiana Șerban |
| October 23 | Sharm El Sheikh, Egypt; Hard $15,000; Singles and doubles draws | (Egypt) Sandra Samir; 6–3, 6–3 | (Denmark) Emilie Francati | (France) Victoria Muntean (Germany) Jule Niemeier | (Romania) Elena-Teodora Cadar (Latvia) Alise Čerņecka (Hungary) Naomi Totka (Slovenia) Nastja Kolar |
| October 23 | Sharm El Sheikh, Egypt; Hard $15,000; Singles and doubles draws | (Egypt) Ola Abou Zekry (Sweden) Linnéa Malmqvist; 5–7, 6–3, [10–3] | (Romania) Elena-Teodora Cadar (Slovenia) Nastja Kolar | (France) Victoria Muntean (Germany) Jule Niemeier | (Romania) Elena-Teodora Cadar (Latvia) Alise Čerņecka (Hungary) Naomi Totka (Slovenia) Nastja Kolar |
| October 23 | Heraklion, Greece; Clay $15,000; Singles and doubles draws | (Hungary) Anna Bondár; 6–2, 6–3 | (Hungary) Réka Luca Jani | (Italy) Martina Colmegna (Switzerland) Lisa Sabino | (Israel) Vlada Ekshibarova (Japan) Satsuki Takamura (France) Jade Suvrijn (Croatia) Oleksandra Oliynykova |
| October 23 | Heraklion, Greece; Clay $15,000; Singles and doubles draws | (Hungary) Anna Bondár (Hungary) Réka Luca Jani; 6–4, 6–2 | (Belgium) Michaela Boev (Russia) Anna Ukolova | (Italy) Martina Colmegna (Switzerland) Lisa Sabino | (Israel) Vlada Ekshibarova (Japan) Satsuki Takamura (France) Jade Suvrijn (Croatia) Oleksandra Oliynykova |
| October 23 | Lambaré, Paraguay; Clay $15,000; Singles and doubles draws | (Brazil) Thaisa Grana Pedretti; 6–2, ret. | (Chile) Fernanda Brito | (Argentina) Stephanie Mariel Petit (Paraguay) Camila Giangreco Campiz | (Brazil) Eduarda Piai (Chile) Ivania Martinich (Argentina) Julieta Lara Estable (Chile) Bárbara Gatica |
| October 23 | Lambaré, Paraguay; Clay $15,000; Singles and doubles draws | (Chile) Fernanda Brito (Paraguay) Camila Giangreco Campiz; Walkover | (Brazil) Thaisa Grana Pedretti (Bolivia) Noelia Zeballos | (Argentina) Stephanie Mariel Petit (Paraguay) Camila Giangreco Campiz | (Brazil) Eduarda Piai (Chile) Ivania Martinich (Argentina) Julieta Lara Estable (Chile) Bárbara Gatica |
| October 23 | Stockholm, Sweden; Hard (indoor) $15,000; Singles and doubles draws | (Sweden) Jacqueline Cabaj Awad; 6–4, 6–0 | (Denmark) Clara Tauson | (Sweden) Mirjam Björklund (Sweden) Fanny Östlund | (Sweden) Julita Saner (Poland) Weronika Jaśmina Foryś (Russia) Valeriya Yushchenko (Norway) Malene Helgø |
| October 23 | Stockholm, Sweden; Hard (indoor) $15,000; Singles and doubles draws | (Russia) Anastasia Kulikova (Estonia) Elena Malygina; 6–2, 7–5 | (Norway) Malene Helgø (Sweden) Fanny Östlund | (Sweden) Mirjam Björklund (Sweden) Fanny Östlund | (Sweden) Julita Saner (Poland) Weronika Jaśmina Foryś (Russia) Valeriya Yushchenko (Norway) Malene Helgø |
| October 23 | Hammamet, Tunisia; Clay $15,000; Singles and doubles draws | (Italy) Michele Alexandra Zmău; 6–1, 6–1 | (France) Caroline Roméo | (Italy) Angelica Moratelli (Finland) Mia Eklund | (France) Yasmine Mansouri (Germany) Sophia Intert (Croatia) Mariana Dražić (Slovakia) Jana Jablonovská |
| October 23 | Hammamet, Tunisia; Clay $15,000; Singles and doubles draws | (France) Yasmine Mansouri (France) Diane Parry; 6–1, 6–1 | (Netherlands) Dominique Karregat (France) Caroline Roméo | (Italy) Angelica Moratelli (Finland) Mia Eklund | (France) Yasmine Mansouri (Germany) Sophia Intert (Croatia) Mariana Dražić (Slovakia) Jana Jablonovská |
| October 23 | Wirral, United Kingdom; Hard (indoor) $15,000; Singles and doubles draws | (United Kingdom) Samantha Murray; 6–2, 6–2 | (United Kingdom) Eden Silva | (Italy) Anna-Giulia Remondina (United Kingdom) Maia Lumsden | (United Kingdom) Freya Christie (France) Margaux Orange (Germany) Lena Rüffer (United Kingdom) Sarah Beth Grey |
| October 23 | Wirral, United Kingdom; Hard (indoor) $15,000; Singles and doubles draws | (United Kingdom) Maia Lumsden (United Kingdom) Samantha Murray; 6–4, 6–3 | (United Kingdom) Alicia Barnett (United Kingdom) Laura Sainsbury | (Italy) Anna-Giulia Remondina (United Kingdom) Maia Lumsden | (United Kingdom) Freya Christie (France) Margaux Orange (Germany) Lena Rüffer (United Kingdom) Sarah Beth Grey |
| October 30 | RBC Pro Challenge; Tyler, United States; Hard $80,000; Singles – Doubles | (United States) Kristie Ahn; 6–4, 6–4 | (United States) Danielle Collins | (United States) Sofia Kenin (United States) Irina Falconi | (United States) Ashley Kratzer (Turkey) Çağla Büyükakçay (Bulgaria) Elitsa Kostova (United States) Taylor Townsend |
| October 30 | RBC Pro Challenge; Tyler, United States; Hard $80,000; Singles – Doubles | (United States) Jessica Pegula (United States) Taylor Townsend; 6–4, 6–1 | (United States) Jamie Loeb (Sweden) Rebecca Peterson | (United States) Sofia Kenin (United States) Irina Falconi | (United States) Ashley Kratzer (Turkey) Çağla Büyükakçay (Bulgaria) Elitsa Kostova (United States) Taylor Townsend |
| October 30 | Canberra Tennis International; Canberra, Australia; Hard $60,000; Singles – Doubles | (Australia) Olivia Rogowska; 6–1, 6–2 | (Australia) Destanee Aiava | (Australia) Alison Bai (Israel) Julia Glushko | (Australia) Kaylah McPhee (Slovenia) Tamara Zidanšek (Papua New Guinea) Abigail Tere-Apisah (Australia) Lizette Cabrera |
| October 30 | Canberra Tennis International; Canberra, Australia; Hard $60,000; Singles – Doubles | (United States) Asia Muhammad (Australia) Arina Rodionova; 6–4, 6–4 | (Australia) Jessica Moore (Australia) Ellen Perez | (Australia) Alison Bai (Israel) Julia Glushko | (Australia) Kaylah McPhee (Slovenia) Tamara Zidanšek (Papua New Guinea) Abigail Tere-Apisah (Australia) Lizette Cabrera |
| October 30 | Tevlin Women's Challenger; Toronto, Canada; Hard (indoor) $60,000; Singles – Doubles | (Belgium) Ysaline Bonaventure; 7–6^{(7–3)}, 6–3 | (Switzerland) Patty Schnyder | (France) Jessika Ponchet (United States) Francesca Di Lorenzo | (Slovakia) Michaela Hončová (Canada) Bianca Andreescu (Belgium) Tamaryn Hendler (Russia) Elena Bovina |
| October 30 | Tevlin Women's Challenger; Toronto, Canada; Hard (indoor) $60,000; Singles – Doubles | (Chile) Alexa Guarachi (New Zealand) Erin Routliffe; 7–6^{(7–4)}, 3–6, [10–4] | (Belgium) Ysaline Bonaventure (Mexico) Victoria Rodríguez | (France) Jessika Ponchet (United States) Francesca Di Lorenzo | (Slovakia) Michaela Hončová (Canada) Bianca Andreescu (Belgium) Tamaryn Hendler (Russia) Elena Bovina |
| October 30 | Open Nantes Atlantique; Nantes, France; Hard (indoor) $25,000; Singles and doubles draws | (Estonia) Kaia Kanepi; 6–3, 6–4 | (Netherlands) Richèl Hogenkamp | (United States) Bernarda Pera (Ukraine) Olga Ianchuk | (Russia) Anna Blinkova (Latvia) Diāna Marcinkēviča (Czech Republic) Jesika Malečková (Switzerland) Conny Perrin |
| October 30 | Open Nantes Atlantique; Nantes, France; Hard (indoor) $25,000; Singles and doubles draws | (France) Manon Arcangioli (France) Shérazad Reix; 6–2, 6–3 | (Netherlands) Lesley Kerkhove (Netherlands) Michaëlla Krajicek | (United States) Bernarda Pera (Ukraine) Olga Ianchuk | (Russia) Anna Blinkova (Latvia) Diāna Marcinkēviča (Czech Republic) Jesika Malečková (Switzerland) Conny Perrin |
| October 30 | Pula, Italy; Clay $25,000; Singles and doubles draws | (Slovenia) Polona Hercog; 6–1, 6–4 | (Romania) Cristina Dinu | (Russia) Amina Anshba (France) Sara Cakarevic | (Italy) Elisabetta Cocciaretto (Argentina) Catalina Pella (Russia) Polina Leykina (Russia) Valeriya Solovyeva |
| October 30 | Pula, Italy; Clay $25,000; Singles and doubles draws | (Italy) Claudia Giovine (Italy) Camilla Rosatello; 6–2, 2–6, [10–7] | (Italy) Anastasia Grymalska (Ukraine) Ganna Poznikhirenko | (Russia) Amina Anshba (France) Sara Cakarevic | (Italy) Elisabetta Cocciaretto (Argentina) Catalina Pella (Russia) Polina Leykina (Russia) Valeriya Solovyeva |
| October 30 | Sant Cugat del Vallès, Spain; Clay $25,000; Singles and doubles draws | (Russia) Marta Paigina; 2–6, 6–4, 6–3 | (Serbia) Olga Danilović | (Poland) Marta Leśniak (Romania) Nicoleta Dascălu | (Hungary) Panna Udvardy (Czech Republic) Anastasia Zarycká (Spain) Georgina García Pérez (Switzerland) Rebeka Masarova |
| October 30 | Sant Cugat del Vallès, Spain; Clay $25,000; Singles and doubles draws | (Brazil) Luisa Stefani (Mexico) Renata Zarazúa; 6–1, 6–4 | (Serbia) Olga Danilović (Spain) Guiomar Maristany | (Poland) Marta Leśniak (Romania) Nicoleta Dascălu | (Hungary) Panna Udvardy (Czech Republic) Anastasia Zarycká (Spain) Georgina García Pérez (Switzerland) Rebeka Masarova |
| October 30 | Pereira, Colombia; Clay $15,000; Singles and doubles draws | (Colombia) María Fernanda Herazo; 7–5, 7–5 | (United Kingdom) Emily Appleton | (United States) Anastasia Nefedova (Argentina) Carla Lucero | (Mexico) María José Portillo Ramírez (Guatemala) Andrea Weedon (Colombia) Paula Andrea Pérez (Bolivia) Noelia Zeballos |
| October 30 | Pereira, Colombia; Clay $15,000; Singles and doubles draws | (United Kingdom) Emily Appleton (Colombia) María Fernanda Herazo; 7–5, 2–6, [10–7] | (The Bahamas) Kerrie Cartwright (United States) Kariann Pierre-Louis | (United States) Anastasia Nefedova (Argentina) Carla Lucero | (Mexico) María José Portillo Ramírez (Guatemala) Andrea Weedon (Colombia) Paula Andrea Pérez (Bolivia) Noelia Zeballos |
| October 30 | Sharm El Sheikh, Egypt; Hard $15,000; Singles and doubles draws | (Spain) Nuria Párrizas Díaz; 7–5, 3–6, 7–6^{(7–3)} | (Egypt) Sandra Samir | (Germany) Julia Wachaczyk (Latvia) Alise Čerņecka | (Ukraine) Anastasiya Shoshyna (Belgium) Margaux Bovy (France) Victoria Muntean (Italy) Lucia Bronzetti |
| October 30 | Sharm El Sheikh, Egypt; Hard $15,000; Singles and doubles draws | (Denmark) Emilie Francati (Germany) Julia Wachaczyk; 7–6^{(8–6)}, 6–7^{(5–7)}, [10–3] | (Sweden) Linnéa Malmqvist (Hungary) Naomi Totka | (Germany) Julia Wachaczyk (Latvia) Alise Čerņecka | (Ukraine) Anastasiya Shoshyna (Belgium) Margaux Bovy (France) Victoria Muntean (Italy) Lucia Bronzetti |
| October 30 | Heraklion, Greece; Clay $15,000; Singles and doubles draws | (Hungary) Réka Luca Jani; 6–0, 6–3 | (Hungary) Anna Bondár | (Italy) Federica Bilardo (Japan) Satsuki Takamura | (Germany) Laura Schaeder (Czech Republic) Aneta Laboutková (Croatia) Oleksandra Oliynykova (Moldova) Anastasia Dețiuc |
| October 30 | Heraklion, Greece; Clay $15,000; Singles and doubles draws | (Hungary) Anna Bondár (Hungary) Réka Luca Jani; 6–4, 2–6, [10–8] | (Romania) Ioana Gaspar (Serbia) Bojana Marinković | (Italy) Federica Bilardo (Japan) Satsuki Takamura | (Germany) Laura Schaeder (Czech Republic) Aneta Laboutková (Croatia) Oleksandra Oliynykova (Moldova) Anastasia Dețiuc |
| October 30 | Pétange, Luxembourg; Hard (indoor) $15,000; Singles and doubles draws | (Belarus) Sviatlana Pirazhenka; 6–2, 4–6, 6–0 | (Netherlands) Chayenne Ewijk | (Luxembourg) Eléonora Molinaro (Belgium) Magali Kempen | (Switzerland) Xenia Knoll (Germany) Julia Victoria Rennert (France) Julie Gervais (Germany) Lena Rüffer |
| October 30 | Pétange, Luxembourg; Hard (indoor) $15,000; Singles and doubles draws | (Netherlands) Chayenne Ewijk (Netherlands) Rosalie van der Hoek; 6–2, 4–6, [10–8] | (France) Priscilla Heise (Belgium) Déborah Kerfs | (Luxembourg) Eléonora Molinaro (Belgium) Magali Kempen | (Switzerland) Xenia Knoll (Germany) Julia Victoria Rennert (France) Julie Gervais (Germany) Lena Rüffer |
| October 30 | Casablanca, Morocco; Clay $15,000; Singles and doubles draws | (Russia) Victoria Kan; 6–0, 6–3 | (Romania) Oana Georgeta Simion | (Germany) Katharina Hering (France) Léa Tholey | (Burundi) Sada Nahimana (Romania) Cristina Adamescu (Russia) Vasilisa Aponasenko (France) Lou Brouleau |
| October 30 | Casablanca, Morocco; Clay $15,000; Singles and doubles draws | (Germany) Katharina Hering (Spain) Olga Parres Azcoitia; 7–6^{(7–4)}, 6–2 | (Russia) Victoria Kan (Russia) Maria Zotova | (Germany) Katharina Hering (France) Léa Tholey | (Burundi) Sada Nahimana (Romania) Cristina Adamescu (Russia) Vasilisa Aponasenko (France) Lou Brouleau |
| October 30 | Asunción, Paraguay; Clay $15,000; Singles and doubles draws | (United Kingdom) Francesca Jones; 6–3, 7–6^{(7–0)} | (Chile) Fernanda Brito | (Brazil) Nathaly Kurata (Brazil) Thaisa Grana Pedretti | (Chile) Ivania Martinich (Argentina) Melany Solange Krywoj (Argentina) Stephanie Mariel Petit (Chile) Bárbara Gatica |
| October 30 | Asunción, Paraguay; Clay $15,000; Singles and doubles draws | (Chile) Fernanda Brito (Paraguay) Camila Giangreco Campiz; 7–6^{(9–7)}, 6–4 | (Brazil) Nathaly Kurata (Brazil) Thaisa Grana Pedretti | (Brazil) Nathaly Kurata (Brazil) Thaisa Grana Pedretti | (Chile) Ivania Martinich (Argentina) Melany Solange Krywoj (Argentina) Stephanie Mariel Petit (Chile) Bárbara Gatica |
| October 30 | Stockholm, Sweden; Hard (indoor) $15,000; Singles and doubles draws | (Denmark) Clara Tauson; 6–3, 6–2 | (Russia) Ekaterina Yashina | (Sweden) Anette Munozova (Cambodia) Andrea Ka | (Poland) Weronika Jaśmina Foryś (Ukraine) Nadiya Kolb (Russia) Polina Golubovskaya (Sweden) Marina Yudanov |
| October 30 | Stockholm, Sweden; Hard (indoor) $15,000; Singles and doubles draws | (Norway) Malene Helgø (Sweden) Fanny Östlund; Walkover | (Ukraine) Maryna Kolb (Ukraine) Nadiya Kolb | (Sweden) Anette Munozova (Cambodia) Andrea Ka | (Poland) Weronika Jaśmina Foryś (Ukraine) Nadiya Kolb (Russia) Polina Golubovskaya (Sweden) Marina Yudanov |
| October 30 | Hammamet, Tunisia; Clay $15,000; Singles and doubles draws | (Finland) Mia Eklund; 7–6^{(7–1)}, 6–4 | (France) Yasmine Mansouri | (Italy) Francesca Bullani (Argentina) Paula Barañano | (Netherlands) Donnaroza Gouvernante (Germany) Lisa Ponomar (Italy) Francesca Sella (Germany) Sophia Intert |
| October 30 | Hammamet, Tunisia; Clay $15,000; Singles and doubles draws | (Italy) Angelica Moratelli (Italy) Natasha Piludu; 6–2, 7–5 | (Netherlands) Dominique Karregat (France) Caroline Roméo | (Italy) Francesca Bullani (Argentina) Paula Barañano | (Netherlands) Donnaroza Gouvernante (Germany) Lisa Ponomar (Italy) Francesca Sella (Germany) Sophia Intert |
| October 30 | Antalya, Turkey; Clay $15,000; Singles and doubles draws | (Russia) Ekaterina Vishnevskaya; 6–3, 0–6, 7–5 | (Bulgaria) Dia Evtimova | (Bulgaria) Julia Stamatova (France) Emma Léné | (Brazil) Carolina Alves (Czech Republic) Gabriela Horáčková (Turkey) Melis Sezer (Moldova) Vitalia Stamat |
| October 30 | Antalya, Turkey; Clay $15,000; Singles and doubles draws | (Turkey) Cemre Anıl (Czech Republic) Gabriela Horáčková; 3–6, 6–4, [10–8] | (Lithuania) Paulina Bakaitė (Turkey) Melis Sezer | (Bulgaria) Julia Stamatova (France) Emma Léné | (Brazil) Carolina Alves (Czech Republic) Gabriela Horáčková (Turkey) Melis Sezer (Moldova) Vitalia Stamat |
| October 30 | Sunderland, United Kingdom; Hard (indoor) $15,000; Singles and doubles draws | (United Kingdom) Maia Lumsden; 6–4, 6–0 | (United Kingdom) Freya Christie | (United Kingdom) Jodie Anna Burrage (United Kingdom) Alicia Barnett | (France) Lucie Wargnier (United Kingdom) Tiffany William (Italy) Anna-Giulia Remondina (United Kingdom) Erin Richardson |
| October 30 | Sunderland, United Kingdom; Hard (indoor) $15,000; Singles and doubles draws | (Greece) Eleni Kordolaimi (United Kingdom) Maia Lumsden; 2–6, 6–2, [11–9] | (United Kingdom) Alicia Barnett (United Kingdom) Sarah Beth Grey | (United Kingdom) Jodie Anna Burrage (United Kingdom) Alicia Barnett | (France) Lucie Wargnier (United Kingdom) Tiffany William (Italy) Anna-Giulia Remondina (United Kingdom) Erin Richardson |

=== November ===
| Week of | Tournament | Winner | Runners-up | Semifinalists | Quarterfinalists |
|---|---|---|---|---|---|
| November 6 | Shenzhen Longhua Open; Shenzhen, China; Hard $100,000; Singles – Doubles | (Canada) Carol Zhao; 7–5, 6–2 | (China) Liu Fangzhou | (China) Zhu Lin (China) Zhang Yuxuan | (Japan) Shuko Aoyama (China) Lu Jingjing (United Kingdom) Katy Dunne (China) Sun Xuliu |
| November 6 | Shenzhen Longhua Open; Shenzhen, China; Hard $100,000; Singles – Doubles | (United States) Jacqueline Cako (Serbia) Nina Stojanović; 6–4, 6–2 | (Japan) Shuko Aoyama (China) Yang Zhaoxuan | (China) Zhu Lin (China) Zhang Yuxuan | (Japan) Shuko Aoyama (China) Lu Jingjing (United Kingdom) Katy Dunne (China) Sun Xuliu |
| November 6 | Ando Securities Open; Tokyo, Japan; Hard $100,000; Singles – Doubles | (China) Zhang Shuai; 6–4, 6–0 | (Romania) Mihaela Buzărnescu | (Japan) Kurumi Nara (Hungary) Dalma Gálfi | (South Korea) Jang Su-jeong (Italy) Georgia Brescia (United States) Naomi Cheong (Japan) Junri Namigata |
| November 6 | Ando Securities Open; Tokyo, Japan; Hard $100,000; Singles – Doubles | (Japan) Rika Fujiwara (Japan) Yuki Naito; 6–1, 6–3 | (Japan) Eri Hozumi (Japan) Junri Namigata | (Japan) Kurumi Nara (Hungary) Dalma Gálfi | (South Korea) Jang Su-jeong (Italy) Georgia Brescia (United States) Naomi Cheong (Japan) Junri Namigata |
| November 6 | Waco Showdown; Waco, United States; Hard $80,000; Singles – Doubles | (United States) Taylor Townsend; 6–3, 2–6, 6–2 | (Croatia) Ajla Tomljanović | (United States) Sofia Kenin (Sweden) Rebecca Peterson | (Slovakia) Anna Karolína Schmiedlová (United States) Danielle Lao (Norway) Ulrikke Eikeri (United States) Kayla Day |
| November 6 | Waco Showdown; Waco, United States; Hard $80,000; Singles – Doubles | (United States) Sofia Kenin (Russia) Anastasiya Komardina; 7–5, 5–7, [11–9] | (United States) Jessica Pegula (United States) Taylor Townsend | (United States) Sofia Kenin (Sweden) Rebecca Peterson | (Slovakia) Anna Karolína Schmiedlová (United States) Danielle Lao (Norway) Ulrikke Eikeri (United States) Kayla Day |
| November 6 | Bendigo Women's International; Bendigo, Australia; Hard $60,000; Singles – Doubles | (Slovenia) Tamara Zidanšek; 5–7, 6–1, 6–0 | (Australia) Olivia Rogowska | (Papua New Guinea) Abigail Tere-Apisah (Japan) Mai Minokoshi | (Australia) Arina Rodionova (Australia) Tammi Patterson (Australia) Isabelle Wallace (Australia) Sara Tomic |
| November 6 | Bendigo Women's International; Bendigo, Australia; Hard $60,000; Singles – Doubles | (Australia) Alison Bai (Australia) Zoe Hives; 4–6, 6–4, [10–8] | (United States) Asia Muhammad (Australia) Arina Rodionova | (Papua New Guinea) Abigail Tere-Apisah (Japan) Mai Minokoshi | (Australia) Arina Rodionova (Australia) Tammi Patterson (Australia) Isabelle Wallace (Australia) Sara Tomic |
| November 6 | Pune, India; Hard $25,000; Singles and doubles draws | (Romania) Jaqueline Cristian; 6–3, 1–6, 6–0 | (India) Karman Kaur Thandi | (Thailand) Bunyawi Thamchaiwat (India) Zeel Desai | (Switzerland) Karin Kennel (Montenegro) Ana Veselinović (Ukraine) Valeriya Strakhova (Slovakia) Tereza Mihalíková |
| November 6 | Pune, India; Hard $25,000; Singles and doubles draws | (Romania) Jaqueline Cristian (Slovakia) Tereza Mihalíková; 4–6, 6–3, [10–7] | (Chinese Taipei) Lee Pei-chi (Russia) Yana Sizikova | (Thailand) Bunyawi Thamchaiwat (India) Zeel Desai | (Switzerland) Karin Kennel (Montenegro) Ana Veselinović (Ukraine) Valeriya Strakhova (Slovakia) Tereza Mihalíková |
| November 6 | Aegon GB Pro-Series Shrewsbury; Shrewsbury, United Kingdom; Hard (indoor) $25,000; Singles and doubles draws | (Germany) Anna-Lena Friedsam; 6–4, 6–2 | (Netherlands) Lesley Kerkhove | (Russia) Marina Melnikova (Liechtenstein) Kathinka von Deichmann | (United Kingdom) Eden Silva (Turkey) Pemra Özgen (Switzerland) Tess Sugnaux (United Kingdom) Samantha Murray |
| November 6 | Aegon GB Pro-Series Shrewsbury; Shrewsbury, United Kingdom; Hard (indoor) $25,000; Singles and doubles draws | (United Kingdom) Freya Christie (United Kingdom) Harriet Dart; 3–6, 6–4, [10–6] | (United Kingdom) Maia Lumsden (United Kingdom) Katie Swan | (Russia) Marina Melnikova (Liechtenstein) Kathinka von Deichmann | (United Kingdom) Eden Silva (Turkey) Pemra Özgen (Switzerland) Tess Sugnaux (United Kingdom) Samantha Murray |
| November 6 | Cúcuta, Colombia; Clay $15,000; Singles and doubles draws | (Colombia) María Fernanda Herazo; 6–2, 6–2 | (United States) Anastasia Nefedova | (Colombia) Camila Osorio (Bolivia) Noelia Zeballos | (Guatemala) Andrea Weedon (United States) Mary Closs (Argentina) Carla Lucero (Colombia) Sofía Múnera Sánchez |
| November 6 | Cúcuta, Colombia; Clay $15,000; Singles and doubles draws | (United Kingdom) Emily Appleton (Mexico) María José Portillo Ramírez; 6–3, 7–6^{(7–2)} | (Colombia) Sofía Múnera Sánchez (Bolivia) Noelia Zeballos | (Colombia) Camila Osorio (Bolivia) Noelia Zeballos | (Guatemala) Andrea Weedon (United States) Mary Closs (Argentina) Carla Lucero (Colombia) Sofía Múnera Sánchez |
| November 6 | Sharm El Sheikh, Egypt; Hard $15,000; Singles and doubles draws | (Italy) Lucia Bronzetti; 6–1, 6–2 | (Germany) Julia Wachaczyk | (Slovenia) Nastja Kolar (Serbia) Barbara Bonić | (Ukraine) Anastasiya Shoshyna (Sweden) Jacqueline Cabaj Awad (Romania) Arina Gabriela Vasilescu (Germany) Romy Kölzer |
| November 6 | Sharm El Sheikh, Egypt; Hard $15,000; Singles and doubles draws | (Germany) Romy Kölzer (Germany) Julia Wachaczyk; 6–3, 7–5 | (Poland) Paulina Czarnik (China) Wang Danni | (Slovenia) Nastja Kolar (Serbia) Barbara Bonić | (Ukraine) Anastasiya Shoshyna (Sweden) Jacqueline Cabaj Awad (Romania) Arina Gabriela Vasilescu (Germany) Romy Kölzer |
| November 6 | Heraklion, Greece; Clay $15,000; Singles and doubles draws | (France) Irina Ramialison; 6–1, 6–4 | (Switzerland) Ylena In-Albon | (Germany) Laura Schaeder (Germany) Tayisiya Morderger | (Austria) Marlies Szupper (Switzerland) Lisa Sabino (Romania) Ioana Gaspar (Germany) Yana Morderger |
| November 6 | Heraklion, Greece; Clay $15,000; Singles and doubles draws | (Japan) Mana Ayukawa (Switzerland) Ylena In-Albon; 6–4, 6–3 | (Germany) Franziska Kommer (Germany) Laura Schaeder | (Germany) Laura Schaeder (Germany) Tayisiya Morderger | (Austria) Marlies Szupper (Switzerland) Lisa Sabino (Romania) Ioana Gaspar (Germany) Yana Morderger |
| November 6 | Internazionali Tennis Val Gardena Südtirol; Ortisei, Italy; Hard (indoor) $15,000; Singles and doubles draws | (Italy) Federica Di Sarra; 6–1, 6–3 | (Russia) Alina Silich | (Italy) Verena Hofer (Belgium) Hélène Scholsen | (Czech Republic) Vendula Žovincová (Czech Republic) Kateřina Vaňková (Italy) Camilla Scala (Italy) Stefania Rubini |
| November 6 | Internazionali Tennis Val Gardena Südtirol; Ortisei, Italy; Hard (indoor) $15,000; Singles and doubles draws | (Belgium) Hélène Scholsen (Russia) Alina Silich; 6–3, 7–5 | (Russia) Alena Fomina (Russia) Ekaterina Kazionova | (Italy) Verena Hofer (Belgium) Hélène Scholsen | (Czech Republic) Vendula Žovincová (Czech Republic) Kateřina Vaňková (Italy) Camilla Scala (Italy) Stefania Rubini |
| November 6 | Beni Mellal, Morocco; Clay $15,000; Singles and doubles draws | (Russia) Victoria Kan; 6–3, 6–7^{(1–7)}, 6–1 | (Italy) Federica Arcidiacono | (Romania) Irina Bara (Romania) Cristina Adamescu | (Italy) Nuria Brancaccio (Austria) Pia König (Italy) Miriana Tona (Romania) Oana Georgeta Simion |
| November 6 | Beni Mellal, Morocco; Clay $15,000; Singles and doubles draws | (Croatia) Mariana Dražić (Romania) Oana Georgeta Simion; 6–4, 6–2 | (Italy) Federica Arcidiacono (Spain) Olga Parres Azcoitia | (Romania) Irina Bara (Romania) Cristina Adamescu | (Italy) Nuria Brancaccio (Austria) Pia König (Italy) Miriana Tona (Romania) Oana Georgeta Simion |
| November 6 | Encarnación, Paraguay; Clay $15,000; Singles and doubles draws | (Paraguay) Camila Giangreco Campiz; 6–4, 6–2 | (Brazil) Nathaly Kurata | (Chile) Bárbara Gatica (Argentina) Stephanie Mariel Petit | (Argentina) Eugenia Ganga (Argentina) Melany Solange Krywoj (Chile) Ivania Martinich (Brazil) Thaisa Grana Pedretti |
| November 6 | Encarnación, Paraguay; Clay $15,000; Singles and doubles draws | (Paraguay) Lara Escauriza (Chile) Bárbara Gatica; 6–4, 6–4 | (Brazil) Nathaly Kurata (Brazil) Thaisa Grana Pedretti | (Chile) Bárbara Gatica (Argentina) Stephanie Mariel Petit | (Argentina) Eugenia Ganga (Argentina) Melany Solange Krywoj (Chile) Ivania Martinich (Brazil) Thaisa Grana Pedretti |
| November 6 | Vinaròs, Spain; Clay $15,000; Singles and doubles draws | (Spain) Irene Burillo Escorihuela; 6–2, 7–5 | (Romania) Miriam Bianca Bulgaru | (Japan) Misa Eguchi (Spain) Eva Guerrero Álvarez | (Argentina) Catalina Pella (Hungary) Panna Udvardy (Spain) Guiomar Maristany (Australia) Seone Mendez |
| November 6 | Vinaròs, Spain; Clay $15,000; Singles and doubles draws | (Japan) Misa Eguchi (Japan) Akiko Omae; 6–2, 6–2 | (India) Snehadevi Reddy (Ecuador) Charlotte Römer | (Japan) Misa Eguchi (Spain) Eva Guerrero Álvarez | (Argentina) Catalina Pella (Hungary) Panna Udvardy (Spain) Guiomar Maristany (Australia) Seone Mendez |
| November 6 | Hammamet, Tunisia; Clay $15,000; Singles and doubles draws | (Italy) Gaia Sanesi; 6–3, 6–0 | (Belgium) Marie Benoît | (Netherlands) Cindy Burger (Italy) Anastasia Grymalska | (Ukraine) Anastasiya Fedoryshyn (Italy) Giorgia Marchetti (Italy) Angelica Moratelli (Serbia) Tamara Čurović |
| November 6 | Hammamet, Tunisia; Clay $15,000; Singles and doubles draws | (Serbia) Tamara Čurović (Germany) Lisa Ponomar; 6–4, 7–6^{(9–7)} | (Italy) Anastasia Grymalska (Italy) Giorgia Marchetti | (Netherlands) Cindy Burger (Italy) Anastasia Grymalska | (Ukraine) Anastasiya Fedoryshyn (Italy) Giorgia Marchetti (Italy) Angelica Moratelli (Serbia) Tamara Čurović |
| November 6 | Antalya, Turkey; Clay $15,000; Singles and doubles draws | (Romania) Nicoleta Dascălu; 7–5, 6–3 | (Brazil) Carolina Alves | (Russia) Daria Nazarkina (Romania) Georgia Crăciun | (Russia) Marta Paigina (Italy) Verena Meliss (Germany) Lisa Matviyenko (Bulgaria) Dia Evtimova |
| November 6 | Antalya, Turkey; Clay $15,000; Singles and doubles draws | (Moldova) Vitalia Stamat (Russia) Ekaterina Vishnevskaya; 6–3, 7–5 | (Turkey) İpek Öz (Czech Republic) Gabriela Pantůčková | (Russia) Daria Nazarkina (Romania) Georgia Crăciun | (Russia) Marta Paigina (Italy) Verena Meliss (Germany) Lisa Matviyenko (Bulgaria) Dia Evtimova |
| November 13 | Dunlop World Challenge; Toyota, Japan; Carpet (indoor) $60,000+H; Singles – Doubles | (Romania) Mihaela Buzărnescu; 6–0, 6–1 | (Slovenia) Tamara Zidanšek | (China) Lu Jiajing (Japan) Junri Namigata | (Japan) Haruka Kaji (United Kingdom) Laura Robson (Japan) Miharu Imanishi (Hungary) Dalma Gálfi |
| November 13 | Dunlop World Challenge; Toyota, Japan; Carpet (indoor) $60,000+H; Singles – Doubles | (Russia) Ksenia Lykina (Japan) Junri Namigata; 3–6, 6–3, [10–4] | (Thailand) Nicha Lertpitaksinchai (Thailand) Peangtarn Plipuech | (China) Lu Jiajing (Japan) Junri Namigata | (Japan) Haruka Kaji (United Kingdom) Laura Robson (Japan) Miharu Imanishi (Hungary) Dalma Gálfi |
| November 13 | Zawada, Poland; Carpet (indoor) $25,000; Singles and doubles draws | (Italy) Deborah Chiesa; 6–2, 4–6, 6–4 | (Poland) Katarzyna Piter | (Poland) Maja Chwalińska (Liechtenstein) Kathinka von Deichmann | (United Kingdom) Sarah Beth Grey (Netherlands) Bibiane Schoofs (Ukraine) Olga Ianchuk (Russia) Valeria Savinykh |
| November 13 | Zawada, Poland; Carpet (indoor) $25,000; Singles and doubles draws | (Croatia) Tena Lukas (Czech Republic) Kateřina Vaňková; 6–4, 3–6, [10–4] | (Poland) Weronika Jaśmina Foryś (Belarus) Nika Shytkouskaya | (Poland) Maja Chwalińska (Liechtenstein) Kathinka von Deichmann | (United Kingdom) Sarah Beth Grey (Netherlands) Bibiane Schoofs (Ukraine) Olga Ianchuk (Russia) Valeria Savinykh |
| November 13 | Dakar, Senegal; Hard $25,000; Singles and doubles draws | (Greece) Valentini Grammatikopoulou; 6–0, 7–6^{(7–1)} | (South Africa) Chanel Simmonds | (Norway) Melanie Stokke (Spain) Georgina García Pérez | (Switzerland) Conny Perrin (Brazil) Laura Pigossi (Montenegro) Ana Veselinović (United Kingdom) Katie Swan |
| November 13 | Dakar, Senegal; Hard $25,000; Singles and doubles draws | (Russia) Yana Sizikova (Montenegro) Ana Veselinović; 6–3, 6–3 | (Greece) Valentini Grammatikopoulou (Netherlands) Rosalie van der Hoek | (Norway) Melanie Stokke (Spain) Georgina García Pérez | (Switzerland) Conny Perrin (Brazil) Laura Pigossi (Montenegro) Ana Veselinović (United Kingdom) Katie Swan |
| November 13 | Norman, United States; Hard $25,000; Singles and doubles draws | (United States) Danielle Collins; 1–6, 6–3, 6–4 | (United States) Sachia Vickery | (United States) Sofia Kenin (United States) Maria Sanchez | (United States) Claire Liu (Norway) Ulrikke Eikeri (Slovakia) Michaela Hončová (United States) Chiara Scholl |
| November 13 | Norman, United States; Hard $25,000; Singles and doubles draws | (Belgium) Tamaryn Hendler (United States) Chiara Scholl; 3–6, 6–3, [10–6] | (United States) Maria Sanchez (United States) Caitlin Whoriskey | (United States) Sofia Kenin (United States) Maria Sanchez | (United States) Claire Liu (Norway) Ulrikke Eikeri (Slovakia) Michaela Hončová (United States) Chiara Scholl |
| November 13 | Sharm El Sheikh, Egypt; Hard $15,000; Singles and doubles draws | (Turkey) Pemra Özgen; 6–4, 6–2 | (Belarus) Shalimar Talbi | (Switzerland) Arlinda Rushiti (France) Clémence Fayol | (Serbia) Barbara Bonić (United Kingdom) Jodie Anna Burrage (Sweden) Jacqueline Cabaj Awad (Belgium) Déborah Kerfs |
| November 13 | Sharm El Sheikh, Egypt; Hard $15,000; Singles and doubles draws | (United Kingdom) Jodie Anna Burrage (United Kingdom) Freya Christie; 7–5, 3–6, [13–11] | (Sweden) Linnéa Malmqvist (South Korea) Park Sang-hee | (Switzerland) Arlinda Rushiti (France) Clémence Fayol | (Serbia) Barbara Bonić (United Kingdom) Jodie Anna Burrage (Sweden) Jacqueline Cabaj Awad (Belgium) Déborah Kerfs |
| November 13 | AAVA Open; Helsinki, Finland; Hard (indoor) $15,000; Singles and doubles draws | (United Kingdom) Eden Silva; 6–3, 1–6, 7–5 | (Switzerland) Tess Sugnaux | (Russia) Karine Sarkisova (Russia) Anastasia Kulikova | (Russia) Ekaterina Kazionova (United Kingdom) Summer Yardley (Belgium) Margaux Bovy (Denmark) Karen Barritza |
| November 13 | AAVA Open; Helsinki, Finland; Hard (indoor) $15,000; Singles and doubles draws | (Switzerland) Naïma Karamoko (Switzerland) Tess Sugnaux; 7–5, 6–2 | (Russia) Anastasia Kulikova (Estonia) Elena Malygina | (Russia) Karine Sarkisova (Russia) Anastasia Kulikova | (Russia) Ekaterina Kazionova (United Kingdom) Summer Yardley (Belgium) Margaux Bovy (Denmark) Karen Barritza |
| November 13 | Heraklion, Greece; Clay $15,000; Singles and doubles draws | (Germany) Tayisiya Morderger; 7–5, 6–2 | (Moldova) Anastasia Dețiuc | (Romania) Ioana Gaspar (Romania) Andreea Amalia Roșca | (Switzerland) Chiara Grimm (Moldova) Alexandra Perper (Germany) Yana Morderger (Serbia) Bojana Marinković |
| November 13 | Heraklion, Greece; Clay $15,000; Singles and doubles draws | (Germany) Tayisiya Morderger (Germany) Yana Morderger; 6–2, 7–6^{(9–7)} | (Moldova) Anastasia Dețiuc (Russia) Elina Nepliy | (Romania) Ioana Gaspar (Romania) Andreea Amalia Roșca | (Switzerland) Chiara Grimm (Moldova) Alexandra Perper (Germany) Yana Morderger (Serbia) Bojana Marinković |
| November 13 | Agadir, Morocco; Clay $15,000; Singles and doubles draws | (Romania) Oana Georgeta Simion; 6–4, 6–1 | (Romania) Cristina Adamescu | (Italy) Nuria Brancaccio (Austria) Pia König | (Argentina) Guillermina Naya (Romania) Izabela Gabriela Novac (Italy) Federica Arcidiacono (Switzerland) Jessica Crivelletto |
| November 13 | Agadir, Morocco; Clay $15,000; Singles and doubles draws | (Austria) Pia König (Italy) Miriana Tona; 4–6, 7–6^{(7–5)}, [10–8] | (Croatia) Mariana Dražić (Romania) Oana Georgeta Simion | (Italy) Nuria Brancaccio (Austria) Pia König | (Argentina) Guillermina Naya (Romania) Izabela Gabriela Novac (Italy) Federica Arcidiacono (Switzerland) Jessica Crivelletto |
| November 13 | Oslo, Norway; Hard (indoor) $15,000; Singles and doubles draws | (Switzerland) Leonie Küng; 6–4, 6–4 | (Switzerland) Simona Waltert | (Russia) Ekaterina Yashina (Norway) Malene Helgø | (Ukraine) Oleksandra Piskun (Italy) Martina Colmegna (Croatia) Iva Primorac (Belgium) Hélène Scholsen |
| November 13 | Oslo, Norway; Hard (indoor) $15,000; Singles and doubles draws | (Switzerland) Leonie Küng (Germany) Shaline-Doreen Pipa; 6–4, 5–7, [10–3] | (Germany) Ina Kaufinger (Sweden) Anette Munozova | (Russia) Ekaterina Yashina (Norway) Malene Helgø | (Ukraine) Oleksandra Piskun (Italy) Martina Colmegna (Croatia) Iva Primorac (Belgium) Hélène Scholsen |
| November 13 | Benicarló, Spain; Clay $15,000; Singles and doubles draws | (Slovakia) Vivien Juhászová; 6–1, 6–2 | (Algeria) Inès Ibbou | (Spain) Irene Burillo Escorihuela (Georgia (country)) Ekaterine Gorgodze | (Japan) Misa Eguchi (Russia) Ksenija Sharifova (Spain) Yvonne Cavallé Reimers (Germany) Caroline Werner |
| November 13 | Benicarló, Spain; Clay $15,000; Singles and doubles draws | (Spain) Noelia Bouzó Zanotti (Spain) Ángeles Moreno Barranquero; 6–3, 6–4 | (Spain) Cristina Bucșa (France) Elixane Lechemia | (Spain) Irene Burillo Escorihuela (Georgia (country)) Ekaterine Gorgodze | (Japan) Misa Eguchi (Russia) Ksenija Sharifova (Spain) Yvonne Cavallé Reimers (Germany) Caroline Werner |
| November 13 | Hammamet, Tunisia; Clay $15,000; Singles and doubles draws | (Italy) Gaia Sanesi; 6–3, 6–4 | (Russia) Varvara Gracheva | (Sweden) Mirjam Björklund (Italy) Giorgia Marchetti | (Tunisia) Chiraz Bechri (Germany) Lisa Ponomar (Malta) Elaine Genovese (Ukraine) Anastasiya Fedoryshyn |
| November 13 | Hammamet, Tunisia; Clay $15,000; Singles and doubles draws | (Sweden) Mirjam Björklund (Netherlands) Lexie Stevens; 6–3, 6–0 | (Italy) Beatrice Lombardo (Italy) Gaia Squarcialupi | (Sweden) Mirjam Björklund (Italy) Giorgia Marchetti | (Tunisia) Chiraz Bechri (Germany) Lisa Ponomar (Malta) Elaine Genovese (Ukraine) Anastasiya Fedoryshyn |
| November 13 | Antalya, Turkey; Clay $15,000; Singles and doubles draws | (Germany) Lisa Matviyenko; 6–3, 1–6, 7–5 | (Czech Republic) Magdaléna Pantůčková | (Romania) Ilona Georgiana Ghioroaie (Russia) Anzhelika Isaeva | (Romania) Georgia Crăciun (Switzerland) Daniela Vukovic (Turkey) İpek Öz (Romania) Andreea Ghițescu |
| November 13 | Antalya, Turkey; Clay $15,000; Singles and doubles draws | (Turkey) İpek Öz (Turkey) Melis Sezer; 3–6, 7–5, [14–12] | (Russia) Polina Bakhmutkina (Czech Republic) Magdaléna Pantůčková | (Romania) Ilona Georgiana Ghioroaie (Russia) Anzhelika Isaeva | (Romania) Georgia Crăciun (Switzerland) Daniela Vukovic (Turkey) İpek Öz (Romania) Andreea Ghițescu |
| November 20 | Valencia, Spain; Clay $25,000+H; Singles and doubles draws | (Romania) Irina Bara; 5–7, 6–4, 6–0 | (Serbia) Olga Danilović | (Venezuela) Andrea Gámiz (Spain) Sílvia Soler Espinosa | (Belgium) Marie Benoît (Italy) Giulia Gatto-Monticone (Spain) Olga Sáez Larra (Spain) Georgina García Pérez |
| November 20 | Valencia, Spain; Clay $25,000+H; Singles and doubles draws | (Spain) Cristina Bucșa (Russia) Yana Sizikova; 7–6^{(7–1)}, 7–6^{(7–5)} | (Venezuela) Andrea Gámiz (Spain) Georgina García Pérez | (Venezuela) Andrea Gámiz (Spain) Sílvia Soler Espinosa | (Belgium) Marie Benoît (Italy) Giulia Gatto-Monticone (Spain) Olga Sáez Larra (Spain) Georgina García Pérez |
| November 20 | Minsk, Belarus; Hard (indoor) $15,000; Singles and doubles draws | (France) Manon Arcangioli; 6–7^{(2–7)}, 6–3, 6–2 | (Belarus) Yuliya Hatouka | (Belarus) Nika Shytkouskaya (Russia) Daria Kruzhkova | (Belarus) Anna Kubareva (Russia) Vlada Koval (Ukraine) Nadiya Kolb (Belarus) Katyarina Paulenka |
| November 20 | Minsk, Belarus; Hard (indoor) $15,000; Singles and doubles draws | (Ukraine) Maryna Kolb (Ukraine) Nadiya Kolb; 5–7, 6–4, [10–7] | (France) Manon Arcangioli (Russia) Alena Tarasova | (Belarus) Nika Shytkouskaya (Russia) Daria Kruzhkova | (Belarus) Anna Kubareva (Russia) Vlada Koval (Ukraine) Nadiya Kolb (Belarus) Katyarina Paulenka |
| November 20 | Sharm El Sheikh, Egypt; Hard $15,000; Singles and doubles draws | (Turkey) Pemra Özgen; 6–2, 6–2 | (Serbia) Barbara Bonić | (Japan) Kumi So (United Kingdom) Jodie Anna Burrage | (Sweden) Linnéa Malmqvist (Italy) Giada Clerici (Belarus) Shalimar Talbi (France) Clémence Fayol |
| November 20 | Sharm El Sheikh, Egypt; Hard $15,000; Singles and doubles draws | (United Kingdom) Jodie Anna Burrage (United Kingdom) Freya Christie; 6–4, 7–5 | (Thailand) Watsachol Sawasdee (Thailand) Chanikarn Silakul | (Japan) Kumi So (United Kingdom) Jodie Anna Burrage | (Sweden) Linnéa Malmqvist (Italy) Giada Clerici (Belarus) Shalimar Talbi (France) Clémence Fayol |
| November 20 | Heraklion, Greece; Clay $15,000; Singles and doubles draws | (Switzerland) Lisa Sabino; 2–6, 6–2, 6–1 | (Israel) Vlada Ekshibarova | (Moldova) Alexandra Perper (Romania) Andreea Amalia Roșca | (Romania) Oana Gavrilă (Germany) Yana Morderger (Croatia) Ivana Topčić (Romania) Gabriela Duca |
| November 20 | Heraklion, Greece; Clay $15,000; Singles and doubles draws | (Germany) Tayisiya Morderger (Germany) Yana Morderger; 6–4, 3–6, [10–8] | (Romania) Gabriela Duca (Romania) Oana Gavrilă | (Moldova) Alexandra Perper (Romania) Andreea Amalia Roșca | (Romania) Oana Gavrilă (Germany) Yana Morderger (Croatia) Ivana Topčić (Romania) Gabriela Duca |
| November 20 | Stellenbosch, South Africa; Hard $15,000; Singles and doubles draws | (South Africa) Chanel Simmonds; 6–1, 6–0 | (Hungary) Naomi Totka | (Switzerland) Nina Stadler (Switzerland) Leonie Küng | (Canada) Petra Januskova (Russia) Anna Pribylova (Japan) Mana Ayukawa (Russia) Anastasia Pribylova |
| November 20 | Stellenbosch, South Africa; Hard $15,000; Singles and doubles draws | (Japan) Mana Ayukawa (South Africa) Chanel Simmonds; 6–2, 6–2 | (United Kingdom) Alicia Barnett (Switzerland) Nina Stadler | (Switzerland) Nina Stadler (Switzerland) Leonie Küng | (Canada) Petra Januskova (Russia) Anna Pribylova (Japan) Mana Ayukawa (Russia) Anastasia Pribylova |
| November 20 | Hammamet, Tunisia; Clay $15,000; Singles and doubles draws | (Russia) Varvara Gracheva; 6–4, 7–6^{(7–1)} | (France) Fiona Ferro | (Bosnia and Herzegovina) Jelena Simić (Italy) Gaia Sanesi | (Portugal) Inês Murta (Slovenia) Veronika Erjavec (France) Alice Ramé (Russia) Daria Lodikova |
| November 20 | Hammamet, Tunisia; Clay $15,000; Singles and doubles draws | (Portugal) Inês Murta (Bosnia and Herzegovina) Jelena Simić; 7–5, 5–7, [10–7] | (Russia) Yulia Kulikova (Romania) Denise-Antonela Stoica | (Bosnia and Herzegovina) Jelena Simić (Italy) Gaia Sanesi | (Portugal) Inês Murta (Slovenia) Veronika Erjavec (France) Alice Ramé (Russia) Daria Lodikova |
| November 20 | Antalya, Turkey; Clay $15,000; Singles and doubles draws | (Ukraine) Maryna Chernyshova; 3–6, 7–5, 6–0 | (Bulgaria) Dia Evtimova | (Belgium) Eliessa Vanlangendonck (Germany) Lisa Matviyenko | (Hungary) Alexa Pirók (Czech Republic) Magdaléna Pantůčková (Bulgaria) Gebriela Mihaylova (Turkey) Melis Sezer |
| November 20 | Antalya, Turkey; Clay $15,000; Singles and doubles draws | (Ukraine) Maryna Chernyshova (Belarus) Sviatlana Pirazhenka; 6–4, 6–1 | (Bulgaria) Dia Evtimova (Hungary) Réka Luca Jani | (Belgium) Eliessa Vanlangendonck (Germany) Lisa Matviyenko | (Hungary) Alexa Pirók (Czech Republic) Magdaléna Pantůčková (Bulgaria) Gebriela Mihaylova (Turkey) Melis Sezer |
| November 27 | Catanduva, Brazil; Clay $15,000; Singles and doubles draws | (Brazil) Nathaly Kurata; 6–1, 6–4 | (Brazil) Eduarda Piai | (United States) Madison Bourguignon (Argentina) Carla Lucero | (Argentina) Sofía Luini (Brazil) Rebeca Pereira (Brazil) Giovanna Tomita (Brazil) Alexandra Ferreira da Silva |
| November 27 | Catanduva, Brazil; Clay $15,000; Singles and doubles draws | (Brazil) Nathaly Kurata (Brazil) Eduarda Piai; 6–2, 6–3 | (Argentina) Melina Ferrero (Argentina) Sofía Luini | (United States) Madison Bourguignon (Argentina) Carla Lucero | (Argentina) Sofía Luini (Brazil) Rebeca Pereira (Brazil) Giovanna Tomita (Brazil) Alexandra Ferreira da Silva |
| November 27 | Santiago, Chile; Clay $15,000; Singles and doubles draws | (Russia) Anastasia Pivovarova; 6–2, 4–6, 6–3 | (Chile) Fernanda Brito | (United States) Chiara Scholl (Mexico) Ana Sofía Sánchez | (Argentina) Stephanie Mariel Petit (Mexico) Marcela Zacarías (Brazil) Carolina Alves (Bolivia) Noelia Zeballos |
| November 27 | Santiago, Chile; Clay $15,000; Singles and doubles draws | (United States) Chiara Scholl (Mexico) Marcela Zacarías; 7–6^{(7–2)}, 4–6, [10–6] | (Argentina) Eugenia Ganga (Argentina) Melany Solange Krywoj | (United States) Chiara Scholl (Mexico) Ana Sofía Sánchez | (Argentina) Stephanie Mariel Petit (Mexico) Marcela Zacarías (Brazil) Carolina Alves (Bolivia) Noelia Zeballos |
| November 27 | Milovice, Czech Republic; Hard (indoor) $15,000; Singles and doubles draws | (Czech Republic) Miriam Kolodziejová; 6–3, 6–3 | (France) Manon Arcangioli | (Denmark) Emilie Francati (Czech Republic) Diana Šumová | (United Kingdom) Eden Silva (Czech Republic) Kateřina Vaňková (Czech Republic) Barbora Štefková (Germany) Lena Ruppert |
| November 27 | Milovice, Czech Republic; Hard (indoor) $15,000; Singles and doubles draws | (Slovakia) Jana Jablonovská (Germany) Lena Rüffer; 6–1, 6–3 | (Ukraine) Maryna Kolb (Ukraine) Nadiya Kolb | (Denmark) Emilie Francati (Czech Republic) Diana Šumová | (United Kingdom) Eden Silva (Czech Republic) Kateřina Vaňková (Czech Republic) Barbora Štefková (Germany) Lena Ruppert |
| November 27 | Manta, Ecuador; Hard $15,000; Singles and doubles draws | (Colombia) María Fernanda Herazo; 6–3, 6–0 | (Guatemala) Andrea Weedon | (Russia) Nika Kukharchuk (Belgium) Margaux Bovy | (Cuba) Yusleydis Smith Días (United States) Stephanie Nemtsova (United States) Sofia Sewing (United States) Akilah James |
| November 27 | Manta, Ecuador; Hard $15,000; Singles and doubles draws | (Mexico) María José Portillo Ramírez (United States) Sofia Sewing; 6–1, 6–3 | (United Kingdom) Emily Appleton (Colombia) María Fernanda Herazo | (Russia) Nika Kukharchuk (Belgium) Margaux Bovy | (Cuba) Yusleydis Smith Días (United States) Stephanie Nemtsova (United States) Sofia Sewing (United States) Akilah James |
| November 27 | Cairo, Egypt; Clay $15,000; Singles and doubles draws | (Egypt) Sandra Samir; 6–4, 6–1 | (Slovenia) Nastja Kolar | (Serbia) Bojana Marinković (Austria) Melanie Klaffner | (France) Caroline Roméo (Czech Republic) Karolína Kubáňová (Australia) Jelena Stojanovic (Romania) Arina Gabriela Vasilescu |
| November 27 | Cairo, Egypt; Clay $15,000; Singles and doubles draws | (Japan) Rio Kitagawa (Slovenia) Nastja Kolar; 6–2, 4–6, [10–4] | (Netherlands) Annick Melgers (Romania) Arina Gabriela Vasilescu | (Serbia) Bojana Marinković (Austria) Melanie Klaffner | (France) Caroline Roméo (Czech Republic) Karolína Kubáňová (Australia) Jelena Stojanovic (Romania) Arina Gabriela Vasilescu |
| November 27 | Indore, India; Hard $15,000; Singles and doubles draws | (Russia) Olga Doroshina; 7–6^{(8–6)}, 6–2 | (Montenegro) Ana Veselinović | (India) Mahak Jain (India) Pranjala Yadlapalli | (Bosnia and Herzegovina) Dea Herdželaš (Thailand) Bunyawi Thamchaiwat (Uzbekistan) Albina Khabibulina (Chinese Taipei) Hsu Ching-wen |
| November 27 | Indore, India; Hard $15,000; Singles and doubles draws | (Bosnia and Herzegovina) Dea Herdželaš (Chinese Taipei) Hsu Ching-wen; 6–2, 6–1 | (Uzbekistan) Albina Khabibulina (Kyrgyzstan) Ksenia Palkina | (India) Mahak Jain (India) Pranjala Yadlapalli | (Bosnia and Herzegovina) Dea Herdželaš (Thailand) Bunyawi Thamchaiwat (Uzbekistan) Albina Khabibulina (Chinese Taipei) Hsu Ching-wen |
| November 27 | Stellenbosch, South Africa; Hard $15,000; Singles and doubles draws | (United States) Salma Ewing; 4–6, 6–4, 6–4 | (South Africa) Chanel Simmonds | (France) Lou Adler (Switzerland) Nina Stadler | (United Kingdom) Emilie Lindh (Switzerland) Leonie Küng (United States) Monica Robinson (Russia) Anastasia Pribylova |
| November 27 | Stellenbosch, South Africa; Hard $15,000; Singles and doubles draws | (Japan) Mana Ayukawa (South Africa) Chanel Simmonds; 7–6^{(7–3)}, 6–3 | (Canada) Petra Januskova (United States) Madeleine Kobelt | (France) Lou Adler (Switzerland) Nina Stadler | (United Kingdom) Emilie Lindh (Switzerland) Leonie Küng (United States) Monica Robinson (Russia) Anastasia Pribylova |
| November 27 | Castellón, Spain; Clay $15,000; Singles and doubles draws | (Georgia (country)) Ekaterine Gorgodze; 6–0, 3–6, 6–1 | (Spain) Estrella Cabeza Candela | (Australia) Isabelle Wallace (France) Tessah Andrianjafitrimo | (Spain) Claudia Hoste Ferrer (Ecuador) Charlotte Römer (Spain) Cristina Bucșa (Spain) Rosa Vicens Mas |
| November 27 | Castellón, Spain; Clay $15,000; Singles and doubles draws | (Spain) Yvonne Cavallé Reimers (Brazil) Luisa Stefani; 6–3, 6–1 | (China) Ren Jiaqi (China) Wang Xiyu | (Australia) Isabelle Wallace (France) Tessah Andrianjafitrimo | (Spain) Claudia Hoste Ferrer (Ecuador) Charlotte Römer (Spain) Cristina Bucșa (Spain) Rosa Vicens Mas |
| November 27 | Hammamet, Tunisia; Clay $15,000; Singles and doubles draws | (France) Alice Ramé; 6–2, 6–4 | (France) Jade Suvrijn | (Slovenia) Veronika Erjavec (Bosnia and Herzegovina) Jelena Simić | (Belgium) Marie Benoît (Oman) Fatma Al-Nabhani (Italy) Anna-Giulia Remondina (United States) Anastasia Nefedova |
| November 27 | Hammamet, Tunisia; Clay $15,000; Singles and doubles draws | (Italy) Anna-Giulia Remondina (Italy) Miriana Tona; 6–3, 6–4 | (Bosnia and Herzegovina) Jelena Simić (France) Jade Suvrijn | (Slovenia) Veronika Erjavec (Bosnia and Herzegovina) Jelena Simić | (Belgium) Marie Benoît (Oman) Fatma Al-Nabhani (Italy) Anna-Giulia Remondina (United States) Anastasia Nefedova |
| November 27 | Antalya, Turkey; Clay $15,000; Singles and doubles draws | (Ukraine) Maryna Chernyshova; 6–4, 6–4 | (Russia) Amina Anshba | (Turkey) Ayla Aksu (Japan) Satsuki Takamura | (Hungary) Anna Bondár (Austria) Pia König (Russia) Alina Silich (Hungary) Réka Luca Jani |
| November 27 | Antalya, Turkey; Clay $15,000; Singles and doubles draws | (Japan) Chihiro Muramatsu (Turkey) Melis Sezer; 6–1, 6–4 | (Austria) Pia König (Russia) Alina Silich | (Turkey) Ayla Aksu (Japan) Satsuki Takamura | (Hungary) Anna Bondár (Austria) Pia König (Russia) Alina Silich (Hungary) Réka Luca Jani |

=== December ===
| Week of | Tournament | Winner | Runners-up | Semifinalists | Quarterfinalists |
|---|---|---|---|---|---|
| December 4 | Santiago, Chile; Clay $25,000; Singles and doubles draws | (United States) Chiara Scholl; 6–3, 6–2 | (Mexico) Marcela Zacarías | (Chile) Fernanda Brito (Belgium) Tamaryn Hendler | (Colombia) María Fernanda Herazo (Chile) Bárbara Gatica (Paraguay) Montserrat González (Mexico) Ana Sofía Sánchez |
| December 4 | Santiago, Chile; Clay $25,000; Singles and doubles draws | (Belgium) Tamaryn Hendler (Russia) Anastasia Pivovarova; 7–5, 6–2 | (Brazil) Carolina Alves (Mexico) Ana Sofía Sánchez | (Chile) Fernanda Brito (Belgium) Tamaryn Hendler | (Colombia) María Fernanda Herazo (Chile) Bárbara Gatica (Paraguay) Montserrat González (Mexico) Ana Sofía Sánchez |
| December 4 | Nules, Spain; Clay $25,000; Singles and doubles draws | (Australia) Isabelle Wallace; 6–1, 4–6, 6–3 | (France) Tessah Andrianjafitrimo | (Georgia (country)) Ekaterine Gorgodze (Spain) Sílvia Soler Espinosa | (Spain) Estrella Cabeza Candela (Norway) Ulrikke Eikeri (Romania) Elena-Gabriela Ruse (Netherlands) Cindy Burger |
| December 4 | Nules, Spain; Clay $25,000; Singles and doubles draws | (Ecuador) Charlotte Römer (Spain) Olga Sáez Larra; 2–6, 6–1, [10–7] | (Netherlands) Cindy Burger (Russia) Yana Sizikova | (Georgia (country)) Ekaterine Gorgodze (Spain) Sílvia Soler Espinosa | (Spain) Estrella Cabeza Candela (Norway) Ulrikke Eikeri (Romania) Elena-Gabriela Ruse (Netherlands) Cindy Burger |
| December 4 | Jablonec nad Nisou, Czech Republic; Carpet (indoor) $15,000; Singles and doubles draws | (Czech Republic) Miriam Kolodziejová; 6–3, 6–4 | (Switzerland) Susan Bandecchi | (United Kingdom) Eden Silva (Switzerland) Arlinda Rushiti | (Czech Republic) Tereza Jankovská (Russia) Alena Fomina (Poland) Marta Leśniak (Italy) Alice Matteucci |
| December 4 | Jablonec nad Nisou, Czech Republic; Carpet (indoor) $15,000; Singles and doubles draws | (Czech Republic) Dagmar Dudláková (Poland) Joanna Zawadzka; 0–6, 6–3, [12–10] | (Czech Republic) Aneta Kladivová (Czech Republic) Vendula Žovincová | (United Kingdom) Eden Silva (Switzerland) Arlinda Rushiti | (Czech Republic) Tereza Jankovská (Russia) Alena Fomina (Poland) Marta Leśniak (Italy) Alice Matteucci |
| December 4 | Guayaquil, Ecuador; Hard $15,000; Singles and doubles draws | (Russia) Nika Kukharchuk; 6–0, 2–6, 6–2 | (United States) Sofia Sewing | (Peru) Dominique Schaefer (Argentina) Agustina Chlpac | (Belgium) Margaux Bovy (United Kingdom) Emily Appleton (Mexico) Andrea Renée Villarreal (Ecuador) Camila Romero |
| December 4 | Guayaquil, Ecuador; Hard $15,000; Singles and doubles draws | (Mexico) María José Portillo Ramírez (United States) Sofia Sewing; 7–5, 6–2 | (United States) Stephanie Nemtsova (Peru) Dominique Schaefer | (Peru) Dominique Schaefer (Argentina) Agustina Chlpac | (Belgium) Margaux Bovy (United Kingdom) Emily Appleton (Mexico) Andrea Renée Villarreal (Ecuador) Camila Romero |
| December 4 | Cairo, Egypt; Clay $15,000; Singles and doubles draws | (Romania) Andreea Amalia Roșca; 6–4, 6–4 | (Austria) Melanie Klaffner | (Egypt) Sandra Samir (Slovenia) Nastja Kolar | (Slovakia) Viktória Morvayová (Serbia) Bojana Marinković (United Kingdom) Tiffany William (Russia) Anna Ureke |
| December 4 | Cairo, Egypt; Clay $15,000; Singles and doubles draws | (Japan) Rio Kitagawa (Slovenia) Nastja Kolar; 1–6, 6–4, [10–2] | (Austria) Melanie Klaffner (Australia) Jelena Stojanovic | (Egypt) Sandra Samir (Slovenia) Nastja Kolar | (Slovakia) Viktória Morvayová (Serbia) Bojana Marinković (United Kingdom) Tiffany William (Russia) Anna Ureke |
| December 4 | Solapur, India; Hard $15,000; Singles and doubles draws | (Thailand) Bunyawi Thamchaiwat; 7–6^{(7–2)}, 6–3 | (Russia) Olga Doroshina | (Chinese Taipei) Hsu Ching-wen (United Kingdom) Samantha Murray | (Australia) Kaylah McPhee (India) Rutuja Bhosale (Bosnia and Herzegovina) Dea Herdželaš (Hungary) Panna Udvardy |
| December 4 | Solapur, India; Hard $15,000; Singles and doubles draws | (Chinese Taipei) Hsu Ching-wen (India) Pranjala Yadlapalli; 7–5, 1–6, [10–6] | (United States) Maya Jansen (New Zealand) Erin Routliffe | (Chinese Taipei) Hsu Ching-wen (United Kingdom) Samantha Murray | (Australia) Kaylah McPhee (India) Rutuja Bhosale (Bosnia and Herzegovina) Dea Herdželaš (Hungary) Panna Udvardy |
| December 4 | Stellenbosch, South Africa; Hard $15,000; Singles and doubles draws | (South Africa) Chanel Simmonds; 4–6, 7–6^{(7–3)}, 6–2 | (France) Lou Adler | (Switzerland) Leonie Küng (Switzerland) Nina Stadler | (Germany) Natalia Siedliska (Russia) Anna Pribylova (France) Camille Sireix (Germany) Katharina Hering |
| December 4 | Stellenbosch, South Africa; Hard $15,000; Singles and doubles draws | (United States) Monica Robinson (United States) Zoë Gwen Scandalis; 2–6, 6–4, [10–4] | (Canada) Petra Januskova (United States) Madeleine Kobelt | (Switzerland) Leonie Küng (Switzerland) Nina Stadler | (Germany) Natalia Siedliska (Russia) Anna Pribylova (France) Camille Sireix (Germany) Katharina Hering |
| December 4 | Hammamet, Tunisia; Clay $15,000; Singles and doubles draws | (Bulgaria) Julia Terziyska; 2–6, 6–4, 6–2 | (Russia) Aleksandra Kulik | (Belgium) Marie Benoît (Slovenia) Nina Potočnik | (France) Jade Suvrijn (France) Margot Yerolymos (United States) Anastasia Nefedova (Russia) Daria Lodikova |
| December 4 | Hammamet, Tunisia; Clay $15,000; Singles and doubles draws | (Belgium) Marie Benoît (Bulgaria) Julia Terziyska; 6–2, 6–3 | (Italy) Anna-Giulia Remondina (Serbia) Milana Spremo | (Belgium) Marie Benoît (Slovenia) Nina Potočnik | (France) Jade Suvrijn (France) Margot Yerolymos (United States) Anastasia Nefedova (Russia) Daria Lodikova |
| December 4 | Antalya, Turkey; Clay $15,000; Singles and doubles draws | (Croatia) Tena Lukas; 6–4, 6–7^{(5–7)}, 6–1 | (Argentina) Paula Ormaechea | (Romania) Cristina Dinu (Belgium) Eliessa Vanlangendonck | (Greece) Eleni Kordolaimi (Croatia) Ana Biškić (Ukraine) Maryna Chernyshova (Finland) Mia Eklund |
| December 4 | Antalya, Turkey; Clay $15,000; Singles and doubles draws | (Romania) Cristina Dinu (Finland) Mia Eklund; 6–3, 6–2 | (Bulgaria) Dia Evtimova (Argentina) Paula Ormaechea | (Romania) Cristina Dinu (Belgium) Eliessa Vanlangendonck | (Greece) Eleni Kordolaimi (Croatia) Ana Biškić (Ukraine) Maryna Chernyshova (Finland) Mia Eklund |
| December 11 | Al Habtoor Tennis Challenge; Dubai, United Arab Emirates; Hard $100,000+H; Singles – Doubles | (Switzerland) Belinda Bencic; 6–4, 0–0 ret. | (Croatia) Ajla Tomljanović | (Switzerland) Stefanie Vögele (Italy) Sara Errani | (Poland) Magdalena Fręch (Slovenia) Dalila Jakupović (Bulgaria) Viktoriya Tomova (Romania) Mihaela Buzărnescu |
| December 11 | Al Habtoor Tennis Challenge; Dubai, United Arab Emirates; Hard $100,000+H; Singles – Doubles | (Romania) Mihaela Buzărnescu (Russia) Alena Fomina; 6–4, 6–3 | (Netherlands) Lesley Kerkhove (Belarus) Lidziya Marozava | (Switzerland) Stefanie Vögele (Italy) Sara Errani | (Poland) Magdalena Fręch (Slovenia) Dalila Jakupović (Bulgaria) Viktoriya Tomova (Romania) Mihaela Buzărnescu |
| December 11 | NECC–ITF Women's Tennis Championships; Pune, India; Hard $25,000; Singles and doubles draws | (Spain) Georgina García Pérez; 6–4, 7–5 | (United Kingdom) Katy Dunne | (Oman) Fatma Al-Nabhani (Russia) Olga Doroshina | (China) Lu Jiajing (Ukraine) Ganna Poznikhirenko (India) Rutuja Bhosale (India) Karman Thandi |
| December 11 | NECC–ITF Women's Tennis Championships; Pune, India; Hard $25,000; Singles and doubles draws | (Indonesia) Jessy Rompies (Thailand) Varunya Wongteanchai; 6–4, 6–2 | (United Kingdom) Samantha Murray (Montenegro) Ana Veselinović | (Oman) Fatma Al-Nabhani (Russia) Olga Doroshina | (China) Lu Jiajing (Ukraine) Ganna Poznikhirenko (India) Rutuja Bhosale (India) Karman Thandi |
| December 11 | Santa Cruz, Bolivia; Clay $15,000; Singles and doubles draws | (Chile) Fernanda Brito; 6–4, 6–3 | (Mexico) Ana Sofía Sánchez | (Brazil) Nathaly Kurata (Russia) Nika Kukharchuk | (Chile) Bárbara Gatica (Argentina) Stephanie Mariel Petit (Bolivia) Noelia Zeballos (Paraguay) Camila Giangreco Campiz |
| December 11 | Santa Cruz, Bolivia; Clay $15,000; Singles and doubles draws | (Argentina) Victoria Bosio (Argentina) Stephanie Mariel Petit; 7–5, 2–6, [10–8] | (Chile) Fernanda Brito (Paraguay) Camila Giangreco Campiz | (Brazil) Nathaly Kurata (Russia) Nika Kukharchuk | (Chile) Bárbara Gatica (Argentina) Stephanie Mariel Petit (Bolivia) Noelia Zeballos (Paraguay) Camila Giangreco Campiz |
| December 11 | Cairo, Egypt; Clay $15,000; Singles and doubles draws | (Romania) Andreea Amalia Roșca; 6–1, 6–3 | (Austria) Melanie Klaffner | (Romania) Irina Fetecău (Slovenia) Nastja Kolar | (Poland) Wiktoria Kulik (Sweden) Fanny Östlund (Serbia) Bojana Marinković (Slovakia) Viktória Morvayová |
| December 11 | Cairo, Egypt; Clay $15,000; Singles and doubles draws | (Romania) Andreea Amalia Roșca (Romania) Gabriela Nicole Tătăruș; 6–1, 6–3 | (Austria) Melanie Klaffner (Australia) Jelena Stojanovic | (Romania) Irina Fetecău (Slovenia) Nastja Kolar | (Poland) Wiktoria Kulik (Sweden) Fanny Östlund (Serbia) Bojana Marinković (Slovakia) Viktória Morvayová |
| December 11 | Cordenons, Italy; Clay (indoor) $15,000; Singles and doubles draws | (Italy) Anastasia Grymalska; 6–2, 6–0 | (Switzerland) Lisa Sabino | (Switzerland) Susan Bandecchi (Italy) Stefania Rubini | (Italy) Michele Alexandra Zmău (Italy) Costanza Traversi (Italy) Ludmilla Samsonova (Italy) Federica Di Sarra |
| December 11 | Cordenons, Italy; Clay (indoor) $15,000; Singles and doubles draws | (Italy) Federica Di Sarra (Italy) Michele Alexandra Zmău; 6–2, 1–6, [10–8] | (Italy) Lucia Bronzetti (Italy) Ludmilla Samsonova | (Switzerland) Susan Bandecchi (Italy) Stefania Rubini | (Italy) Michele Alexandra Zmău (Italy) Costanza Traversi (Italy) Ludmilla Samsonova (Italy) Federica Di Sarra |
| December 11 | Hammamet, Tunisia; Clay $15,000; Singles and doubles draws | (France) Sara Cakarevic; 3–6, 6–3, 6–0 | (France) Margot Yerolymos | (France) Tessah Andrianjafitrimo (France) Victoria Muntean | (Italy) Giorgia Marchetti (Sweden) Mirjam Björklund (United Kingdom) Maia Lumsden (United States) Anastasia Nefedova |
| December 11 | Hammamet, Tunisia; Clay $15,000; Singles and doubles draws | (Italy) Claudia Giovine (Italy) Giorgia Marchetti; 6–3, 6–1 | (France) Victoria Muntean (Bulgaria) Isabella Shinikova | (France) Tessah Andrianjafitrimo (France) Victoria Muntean | (Italy) Giorgia Marchetti (Sweden) Mirjam Björklund (United Kingdom) Maia Lumsden (United States) Anastasia Nefedova |
| December 11 | Antalya, Turkey; Clay $15,000; Singles and doubles draws | (Romania) Cristina Dinu; 6–3, 6–3 | (Croatia) Tena Lukas | (Turkey) Pemra Özgen (France) Elixane Lechemia | (Russia) Alina Silich (Greece) Eleni Kordolaimi (Belgium) Eliessa Vanlangendonck (Ukraine) Maryna Chernyshova |
| December 11 | Antalya, Turkey; Clay $15,000; Singles and doubles draws | (Ukraine) Maryna Chernyshova (Russia) Alina Silich; 6–3, 6–7^{(3–7)}, [10–8] | (Greece) Eleni Kordolaimi (Bosnia and Herzegovina) Jasmina Tinjić | (Turkey) Pemra Özgen (France) Elixane Lechemia | (Russia) Alina Silich (Greece) Eleni Kordolaimi (Belgium) Eliessa Vanlangendonck (Ukraine) Maryna Chernyshova |
| December 18 | Navi Mumbai, India; Hard $25,000; Singles and doubles draws | (United Kingdom) Gabriella Taylor; 4–6, 7–6^{(9–7)}, 6–3 | (Latvia) Diāna Marcinkēviča | (Spain) Aliona Bolsova Zadoinov (India) Ankita Raina | (Ukraine) Valeriya Strakhova (Montenegro) Ana Veselinović (India) Karman Thandi (Russia) Polina Monova |
| December 18 | Navi Mumbai, India; Hard $25,000; Singles and doubles draws | (Spain) Georgina García Pérez (Latvia) Diāna Marcinkēviča; 6–0, 6–1 | (India) Pranjala Yadlapalli (Slovenia) Tamara Zidanšek | (Spain) Aliona Bolsova Zadoinov (India) Ankita Raina | (Ukraine) Valeriya Strakhova (Montenegro) Ana Veselinović (India) Karman Thandi (Russia) Polina Monova |
| December 18 | Luque, Paraguay; Hard $15,000; Singles and doubles draws | (Paraguay) Montserrat González; 1–6, 6–3, 6–0 | (Russia) Nika Kukharchuk | (Brazil) Thaisa Grana Pedretti (Paraguay) Camila Giangreco Campiz | (Mexico) Ana Sofía Sánchez (Argentina) Melany Solange Krywoj (Bolivia) Noelia Zeballos (Argentina) Carla Lucero |
| December 18 | Luque, Paraguay; Hard $15,000; Singles and doubles draws | (Brazil) Thaisa Grana Pedretti (Bolivia) Noelia Zeballos; 6–2, 6–4 | (Paraguay) Montserrat González (Mexico) Ana Sofía Sánchez | (Brazil) Thaisa Grana Pedretti (Paraguay) Camila Giangreco Campiz | (Mexico) Ana Sofía Sánchez (Argentina) Melany Solange Krywoj (Bolivia) Noelia Zeballos (Argentina) Carla Lucero |
| December 18 | Hammamet, Tunisia; Clay $15,000; Singles and doubles draws | (Russia) Daria Lodikova; 7–6^{(10–8)}, 6–4 | (Italy) Ludmilla Samsonova | (France) Audrey Albié (Slovenia) Nina Potočnik | (Sweden) Mirjam Björklund (France) Irys Ekani (France) Alice Ramé (Bulgaria) Isabella Shinikova |
| December 18 | Hammamet, Tunisia; Clay $15,000; Singles and doubles draws | (France) Audrey Albié (France) Mathilde Armitano; 6–2, 6–4 | (Italy) Claudia Giovine (Italy) Giorgia Marchetti | (France) Audrey Albié (Slovenia) Nina Potočnik | (Sweden) Mirjam Björklund (France) Irys Ekani (France) Alice Ramé (Bulgaria) Isabella Shinikova |
| December 18 | Antalya, Turkey; Clay $15,000; Singles and doubles draws | (Ukraine) Maryna Chernyshova; 6–0, 6–7^{(10–12)}, 6–1 | (Russia) Alina Silich | (Russia) Ksenia Laskutova (Romania) Andreea Amalia Roșca | (Russia) Daria Nazarkina (Croatia) Lea Bošković (Romania) Teodora Stîngă (France) Elixane Lechemia |
| December 18 | Antalya, Turkey; Clay $15,000; Singles and doubles draws | (Russia) Anastasia Kharitonova (Russia) Daria Nazarkina; 7–5, 2–6, [10–8] | (Romania) Andreea Amalia Roșca (Romania) Gabriela Nicole Tătăruș | (Russia) Ksenia Laskutova (Romania) Andreea Amalia Roșca | (Russia) Daria Nazarkina (Croatia) Lea Bošković (Romania) Teodora Stîngă (France) Elixane Lechemia |
| December 25 | Hong Kong; Hard $15,000; Singles and doubles draws | (Japan) Haruka Kaji; 4–6, 6–2, 7–6^{(7–4)} | (Japan) Hiroko Kuwata | (Belgium) Hélène Scholsen (Hong Kong) Zhang Ling | (Chinese Taipei) Lee Pei-chi (Japan) Yuuki Tanaka (Japan) Mai Hontama (Japan) Aiko Yoshitomi |
| December 25 | Hong Kong; Hard $15,000; Singles and doubles draws | (Chinese Taipei) Chen Pei-hsuan (Chinese Taipei) Wu Fang-hsien; 6–1, 6–0 | (Chinese Taipei) Chan Chin-wei (China) Lu Jiaxi | (Belgium) Hélène Scholsen (Hong Kong) Zhang Ling | (Chinese Taipei) Lee Pei-chi (Japan) Yuuki Tanaka (Japan) Mai Hontama (Japan) Aiko Yoshitomi |
