= 2018 RBC Pro Challenge – Doubles =

Doubles
- 2018 RBC Pro Challenge

Final
- Champions: (United States) Nicole Gibbs (United States) Asia Muhammad
- Runners-up: (United States) Desirae Krawczyk (Mexico) Giuliana Olmos
- Score: 3–6, 6–3, [14–12]

Events
Singles	Doubles
← 2017 ·	RBC Pro Challenge	· 2019 →

Jessica Pegula and Taylor Townsend were the defending champions, but both players decided not to participate.

Nicole Gibbs and Asia Muhammad won the title after defeating Desirae Krawczyk and Giuliana Olmos 3–6, 6–3, [14–12] in the final.

== Seeds ==
1. (United States) Desirae Krawczyk / (Mexico) Giuliana Olmos (final)
2. (Switzerland) Belinda Bencic / (Hungary) Fanny Stollár (semifinals)
3. (United States) Sophie Chang / (United States) Alexandra Mueller (semifinals)
4. (United States) Nicole Gibbs / (United States) Asia Muhammad (champions)

== Draw ==
=== Key ===
- Q = Qualifier
- WC = Wild card
- LL = Lucky loser
- Alt = Alternate
- SE = Special exempt
- PR = Protected ranking
- ITF = ITF entry
- JE = Junior exempt
- w/o = Walkover
- r = Retired
- d = Defaulted
- SR = Special ranking

=== Draw ===
First round
1	(United States) D Krawczyk (Mexico) G Olmos	7	6
(United States) C Van Nguyen (United States) M Westby	5	0
(Norway) U Eikeri (United States) I Neel	6	7^{7}
(Indonesia) B Gumulya (Venezuela) A Uzcátegui	1	6^{4}
3	(United States) S Chang (United States) A Mueller	4	6	[11]
(United States) J Elbaba (Mexico) AS Sánchez	6	2	[9]
(United States) S Marand (United States) W Osuigwe	6	7
(Hungary) D Gálfi (Hungary) RL Jani	2	5
(United States) K Ahn (United States) Q Gleason	7	6
(Brazil) PC Gonçalves (Brazil) B Haddad Maia	5	4
WC	(Italy) S Castellano (United States) H Verner	5	3
4	(United States) N Gibbs (United States) A Muhammad	7	6
(United States) C McHale (United States) C McNally	5	6	[7]
(United States) M Brengle (United States) L Davis	7	3	[10]
(Chinese Taipei) C-y Hsu (Indonesia) J Rompies	3	4
2	(Switzerland) B Bencic (Hungary) F Stollár	6	6

Quarterfinals
1	(United States) D Krawczyk (Mexico) G Olmos	6	6
(Norway) U Eikeri (United States) I Neel	2	4
3	(United States) S Chang (United States) A Mueller	6	6
(United States) S Marand (United States) W Osuigwe	4	2
(United States) K Ahn (United States) Q Gleason
4	(United States) N Gibbs (United States) A Muhammad	w/o
(United States) M Brengle (United States) L Davis	6	2	[7]
2	(Switzerland) B Bencic (Hungary) F Stollár	4	6	[10]

Semifinals
1	(United States) D Krawczyk (Mexico) G Olmos	7	7^{7}
3	(United States) S Chang (United States) A Mueller	5	6^{5}
4	(United States) N Gibbs (United States) A Muhammad	6	3	[11]
2	(Switzerland) B Bencic (Hungary) F Stollár	4	6	[9]

Final
1	(United States) D Krawczyk (Mexico) G Olmos	6	3	[12]
4	(United States) N Gibbs (United States) A Muhammad	3	6	[14]
