= 2019 RBC Pro Challenge – Doubles =

Doubles
- 2019 RBC Pro Challenge

Final
- Champions: (Indonesia) Beatrice Gumulya (Indonesia) Jessy Rompies
- Runners-up: (Chinese Taipei) Hsu Chieh-yu (Mexico) Marcela Zacarías
- Score: 6–2, 6–3

Events
Singles	Doubles
← 2018 ·	RBC Pro Challenge	· 2020 →

Nicole Gibbs and Asia Muhammad were the defending champions, but chose not to participate.

Beatrice Gumulya and Jessy Rompies won the title, defeating Hsu Chieh-yu and Marcela Zacarías in the final, 6–2, 6–3.

== Seeds ==
1. (Mexico) Giuliana Olmos / (Australia) Ellen Perez (semifinals)
2. (Sweden) Johanna Larsson / (Luxembourg) Mandy Minella (quarterfinals)
3. (United Kingdom) Sarah Beth Grey / (New Zealand) Paige Hourigan (first round)
4. (Montenegro) Vladica Babić / (United States) Caitlin Whoriskey (first round)

== Draw ==
=== Key ===
- Q = Qualifier
- WC = Wild card
- LL = Lucky loser
- Alt = Alternate
- SE = Special exempt
- PR = Protected ranking
- ITF = ITF entry
- JE = Junior exempt
- w/o = Walkover
- r = Retired
- d = Defaulted
- SR = Special ranking

=== Draw ===
First round
1	(Mexico) G Olmos (Australia) E Perez	6	6
(France) M Partaud (Romania) G Talabă	1	1
(United Kingdom) JA Burrage (Australia) J Fourlis	6	6
(United States) S Chang (United States) A Mueller	2	0
3	(United Kingdom) SB Grey (New Zealand) P Hourigan	3	6^{4}
(Indonesia) B Gumulya (Indonesia) J Rompies	6	7^{7}
(United Kingdom) A Barnett (Germany) S Wagner	7^{8}	1	[10]
(United States) UM Arconada (United States) J Loeb	6^{6}	6	[7]
WC	(Latvia) L Dekmeijere (Russia) M Kononova	6	6
(United States) J Cako (Russia) A Gabueva	3	4
(Chinese Taipei) C-y Hsu (Mexico) M Zacarías	6	4	[10]
4	(Montenegro) V Babić (United States) C Whoriskey	4	6	[8]
(United States) C McNally (United States) W Osuigwe
(United States) L Guillermo (Poland) A Hertel	w/o
WC	(United States) E Douglas (United States) E Mandlik	6	5	[4]
2	(Sweden) J Larsson (Luxembourg) M Minella	3	7	[10]

Quarterfinals
1	(Mexico) G Olmos (Australia) E Perez	6	7^{7}
(United Kingdom) JA Burrage (Australia) J Fourlis	3	6^{3}
(Indonesia) B Gumulya (Indonesia) J Rompies	6	6
(United Kingdom) A Barnett (Germany) S Wagner	1	2
WC	(Latvia) L Dekmeijere (Russia) M Kononova	6	2	[8]
(Chinese Taipei) C-y Hsu (Mexico) M Zacarías	1	6	[10]
(United States) L Guillermo (Poland) A Hertel	6	6
2	(Sweden) J Larsson (Luxembourg) M Minella	4	2

Semifinals
1	(Mexico) G Olmos (Australia) E Perez	6	6^{6}	[8]
(Indonesia) B Gumulya (Indonesia) J Rompies	2	7^{8}	[10]
(Chinese Taipei) C-y Hsu (Mexico) M Zacarías	6	7
(United States) L Guillermo (Poland) A Hertel	0	5

Final
(Indonesia) B Gumulya (Indonesia) J Rompies	6	6
(Chinese Taipei) C-y Hsu (Mexico) M Zacarías	2	3
