= 2018 RBC Pro Challenge =

- Date: 29 October–4 November
- Edition: 2nd
- Category: ITF Women's Circuit
- Prize money: $80,000
- Surface: Hard
- Location: Tyler, United States

Champions

Singles
- (United States) Whitney Osuigwe

Doubles
- (United States) Nicole Gibbs / (United States) Asia Muhammad
← 2017 ·	RBC Pro Challenge	· 2019 →

The 2018 RBC Pro Challenge was a professional tennis tournament played on outdoor hard courts. It was the second edition of the tournament and was part of the 2018 ITF Women's Circuit. It took place in Tyler, United States, on 29 October–4 November 2018.

== Singles main draw entrants ==
=== Seeds ===
Country	Player	Rank^{1}	Seed
SUI	Belinda Bencic	37	1
USA	Madison Brengle	89	2
HUN	Fanny Stollár	127	3
USA	Jessica Pegula	129	4
USA	Claire Liu	139	5
USA	Nicole Gibbs	143	6
USA	Kristie Ahn	145	7
USA	Christina McHale	153	8

- ^{1} Rankings as of 22 October 2018.

=== Other entrants ===
The following players received a wildcard into the singles main draw:

- (United States) Sophie Chang
- (United States) Louisa Chirico
- (United States) Christina McHale
- (United States) Caty McNally

The following player received entry using a protected ranking:

- (United States) Elizabeth Halbauer
- (Argentina) Nadia Podoroska

The following player received entry using a junior exempt:

- (United States) Whitney Osuigwe

The following players received entry from the qualifying draw:

- (United States) Ellie Douglas
- (United States) Quinn Gleason
- (United States) Ann Li
- (Italy) Bianca Turati

== Champions ==
=== Singles ===
- (United States) Whitney Osuigwe def. (Brazil) Beatriz Haddad Maia, 6–3, 6–4

=== Doubles ===
- (United States) Nicole Gibbs / (United States) Asia Muhammad def. (United States) Desirae Krawczyk / (Mexico) Giuliana Olmos, 3–6, 6–3, [14–12]
