= 2019 RBC Pro Challenge =

- Date: 28 October–3 November 2019
- Edition: 3rd
- Category: ITF Women's World Tennis Tour
- Prize money: $80,000
- Surface: Hard
- Location: Tyler, Texas, United States

Champions

Singles
- (Luxembourg) Mandy Minella

Doubles
- (Indonesia) Beatrice Gumulya / (Indonesia) Jessy Rompies
← 2018 ·	RBC Pro Challenge	· 2020 →

The 2019 RBC Pro Challenge was a professional tennis tournament played on outdoor hard courts. It was the third edition of the tournament which was part of the 2019 ITF Women's World Tennis Tour. It took place in Tyler, Texas, United States between 28 October and 3 November 2019.

== Singles main-draw entrants ==
=== Seeds ===
Country	Player	Rank^{1}	Seed
AUS	Astra Sharma	102	1
~~USA~~	~~Caty McNally~~	~~112~~	~~2~~
ROU	Patricia Maria Țig	115	3
USA	Whitney Osuigwe	116	4
SUI	Stefanie Vögele	123	5
USA	Usue Maitane Arconada	138	6
USA	Ann Li	147	7
USA	Caroline Dolehide	166	8

- ^{1} Rankings are as of 21 October 2019.

=== Other entrants ===
The following players received wildcards into the singles main draw:

- (United States) Alexa Glatch
- (United States) Jamie Loeb
- (United States) Grace Min
- (United States) CoCo Vandeweghe

The following player received entry using a protected ranking:

- (United States) Irina Falconi

The following players received entry from the qualifying draw:

- (United States) Katharine Fahey
- (United States) Lorraine Guillermo
- (United States) Sanaz Marand
- (Mexico) Giuliana Olmos
- (Spain) Estela Pérez Somarriba
- (Germany) Stephanie Wagner
- (United States) Sophia Whittle
- (Mexico) Marcela Zacarías

The following player received entry as a lucky loser:

- (Montenegro) Vladica Babić

== Champions ==
=== Singles ===
- (Luxembourg) Mandy Minella def. (United States) Alexa Glatch, 6–4, 6–4

=== Doubles ===
- (Indonesia) Beatrice Gumulya / (Indonesia) Jessy Rompies def. (Chinese Taipei) Hsu Chieh-yu / (Mexico) Marcela Zacarías, 6–2, 6–3
