= 2018 RBC Pro Challenge – Singles =

Singles
- 2018 RBC Pro Challenge

Final
- Champion: (United States) Whitney Osuigwe
- Runner-up: (Brazil) Beatriz Haddad Maia
- Score: 6–3, 6–4

Events
Singles	Doubles
← 2017 ·	RBC Pro Challenge	· 2019 →

Kristie Ahn was the defending champion, but retired in the first round against Kurumi Nara.

Whitney Osuigwe won the title, defeating Beatriz Haddad Maia in the final, 6–3, 6–4.

== Seeds ==
1. (Switzerland) Belinda Bencic (semifinals)
2. (United States) Madison Brengle (second round)
3. (Hungary) Fanny Stollár (first round)
4. (United States) Jessica Pegula (first round)
5. (United States) Claire Liu (second round)
6. (United States) Nicole Gibbs (second round)
7. (United States) Kristie Ahn (first round, retired)
8. (United States) Christina McHale (second round)

== Draw ==
=== Key ===
- Q = Qualifier
- WC = Wild card
- LL = Lucky loser
- Alt = Alternate
- ITF = ITF entry
- PR = Protected ranking
- SR = Special ranking
- SE = Special exempt
- JE = Junior exempt
- JR = Junior Accelerator Programme entrant
- CO = College Accelerator Programme entrant
- NG = Next Gen Accelerator Program entrant
- w/o = Walkover
- r = Retired
- d = Defaulted

=== Finals ===
Semifinals
1	(Switzerland) Belinda Bencic	4	6	6^{3}
JE	(United States) Whitney Osuigwe	6	2	7^{7}
(Brazil) Beatriz Haddad Maia	6	6
(United States) Danielle Lao	2	3

Final
JE	(United States) Whitney Osuigwe	6	6
(Brazil) Beatriz Haddad Maia	3	4

=== Top half ===
First round
1	(Switzerland) B Bencic	6	6
(Norway) U Eikeri	1	2
(United States) V Lepchenko	6	4	6
(Russia) V Flink	3	6	4
Q	(United States) A Li	2	5
(United States) K Day	6	7
PR	(United States) E Halbauer	6	5	3
8/WC	(United States) C McHale	3	7	6
3	(Hungary) F Stollár	4	6	3
PR	(Argentina) N Podoroska	6	4	6
(Paraguay) V Cepede Royg	0	2
WC	(United States) C McNally	6	6
JE	(United States) W Osuigwe	6	5	6
WC	(United States) S Chang	2	7	3
(Japan) K Nara	6	0
7	(United States) K Ahn	2	0^{r}

Second round
1	(Switzerland) B Bencic	6	7
(United States) V Lepchenko	2	5
(United States) K Day	6	7^{7}
8/WC	(United States) C McHale	4	6^{3}
PR	(Argentina) N Podoroska	2	1
WC	(United States) C McNally	6	6
JE	(United States) W Osuigwe	6^{4}	6	6
(Japan) K Nara	7^{7}	3	2

Quarterfinals
1	(Switzerland) B Bencic	4	6	6
(United States) K Day	6	2	2
WC	(United States) C McNally	7	6^{3}	3
JE	(United States) W Osuigwe	5	7^{7}	6

Semifinals
1	(Switzerland) B Bencic	4	6	6^{3}
JE	(United States) W Osuigwe	6	2	7^{7}

=== Bottom half ===
First round
5	(United States) C Liu	6	3	6
Q	(Italy) B Turati	2	6	3
(Bulgaria) S Karatantcheva	6	6
(United States) A Kiick	1	2
(United States) G Brodsky	6	5	3
(Brazil) B Haddad Maia	1	7	6
WC	(United States) L Chirico	7^{7}	6
4	(United States) J Pegula	6^{4}	0
6	(United States) N Gibbs	6	4	6
(United States) A Muhammad	3	6	3
(United States) D Lao	6	7^{7}
(United States) G Min	1	6^{3}
Q	(United States) E Douglas	5	6	4
(United States) L Davis	7	4	6
Q	(United States) Q Gleason	6	1	0
2	(United States) M Brengle	4	6	6

Second round
5	(United States) C Liu	4	3
(Bulgaria) S Karatantcheva	6	6
(Brazil) B Haddad Maia	7^{7}	6
WC	(United States) L Chirico	6^{3}	4
6	(United States) N Gibbs	2	3
(United States) D Lao	6	6
(United States) L Davis	3	6	6
2	(United States) M Brengle	6	4	4

Quarterfinals
(Bulgaria) S Karatantcheva	1	6	5
(Brazil) B Haddad Maia	6	3	7
(United States) D Lao	6	7
(United States) L Davis	1	5

Semifinals
(Brazil) B Haddad Maia	6	6
(United States) D Lao	2	3
