= 2019 RBC Pro Challenge – Singles =

Singles
- 2019 RBC Pro Challenge

Final
- Champion: (Luxembourg) Mandy Minella
- Runner-up: (United States) Alexa Glatch
- Score: 6–4, 6–4

Events
Singles	Doubles
← 2018 ·	RBC Pro Challenge	· 2020 →

Whitney Osuigwe was the defending champion, but lost to Danielle Lao in the quarterfinals.

Mandy Minella won the title, defeating Alexa Glatch in the final, 6–4 6–4.

== Seeds ==
1. (Australia) Astra Sharma (first round)
2. (United States) Caty McNally (withdrew)
3. (Romania) Patricia Maria Țig (first round)
4. (United States) Whitney Osuigwe (quarterfinals)
5. (Switzerland) Stefanie Vögele (second round)
6. (United States) Usue Maitane Arconada (first round)
7. (United States) Ann Li (second round)
8. (United States) Caroline Dolehide (quarterfinals)

== Draw ==
=== Key ===
- Q = Qualifier
- WC = Wild card
- LL = Lucky loser
- Alt = Alternate
- SE = Special exempt
- PR = Protected ranking
- ITF = ITF entry
- JE = Junior exempt
- w/o = Walkover
- r = Retired
- d = Defaulted
- SR = Special ranking

=== Finals ===
Semifinals
WC	(United States) Alexa Glatch	5	6	6
Q	(Mexico) Marcela Zacarías	7	4	2
(United States) Danielle Lao	1	5
(Luxembourg) Mandy Minella	6	7

Final
WC	(United States) Alexa Glatch	4	4
(Luxembourg) Mandy Minella	6	6

=== Top half ===
First round
1	(Australia) A Sharma	2	4
WC	(United States) A Glatch	6	6
(Israel) D Khazaniuk	3	1
(United States) S Rogers	6	6
Q	(Germany) S Wagner	4	5
(Canada) K Sebov	6	7
WC	(United States) G Min	6^{2}	6	4
8	(United States) C Dolehide	7^{7}	4	6
3	(Romania) PM Țig	4	2
Q	(United States) K Fahey	6	6
Q	(Mexico) M Zacarías	6	6
Q	(United States) S Whittle	4	4
WC	(United States) C Vandeweghe	7^{7}	6
Q	(United States) S Marand	6^{0}	3
(Japan) M Hibi	5	6^{1}
7	(United States) A Li	7	7^{7}

Second round
WC	(United States) A Glatch	6	7
(United States) S Rogers	3	5
(Canada) K Sebov	3	2
8	(United States) C Dolehide	6	6
Q	(United States) K Fahey	5	6	3
Q	(Mexico) M Zacarías	7	3	6
WC	(United States) C Vandeweghe	6	7
7	(United States) A Li	4	5

Quarterfinals
WC	(United States) A Glatch	7^{7}	6
8	(United States) C Dolehide	6^{4}	1
Q	(Mexico) M Zacarías	5
WC	(United States) C Vandeweghe	2^{r}

Semifinals
WC	(United States) A Glatch	5	6	6
Q	(Mexico) M Zacarías	7	4	2

=== Bottom half ===
First round
5	(Switzerland) S Vögele	6	6^{2}	6
(Sweden) J Larsson	4	7^{7}	2
(United States) D Lao	6	6^{3}	6
(Romania) G Talabă	4	7^{7}	3
(Ukraine) A Kalinina	2	3
Q	(Spain) E Pérez Somarriba	6	6
(Australia) E Perez	1	6	6^{3}
4	(United States) W Osuigwe	6	4	7^{7}
6	(United States) UM Arconada	6^{6}	5
Q	(Mexico) G Olmos	7^{8}	7
PR	(United States) I Falconi	6	6^{1}	3
(Luxembourg) M Minella	4	7^{7}	6
(Australia) J Fourlis	0	5
Q	(United States) L Guillermo	6	7
WC	(United States) J Loeb	7	6
LL	(Montenegro) V Babić	5	2

Second round
5	(Switzerland) S Vögele	4	6	1
(United States) D Lao	6	1	6
Q	(Spain) E Pérez Somarriba	2	4
4	(United States) W Osuigwe	6	6
Q	(Mexico) G Olmos	1	6	1
(Luxembourg) M Minella	6	2	6
Q	(United States) L Guillermo	3	4
WC	(United States) J Loeb	6	6

Quarterfinals
(United States) D Lao	6	6
4	(United States) W Osuigwe	3	4
(Luxembourg) M Minella	6	6
WC	(United States) J Loeb	4	1

Semifinals
(United States) D Lao	1	5
(Luxembourg) M Minella	6	7
