= 2017 RBC Pro Challenge – Doubles =

Doubles
- 2017 RBC Pro Challenge

Final
- Champion: (United States) Jessica Pegula (United States) Taylor Townsend
- Runner-up: (United States) Jamie Loeb (Sweden) Rebecca Peterson
- Score: 6–4, 6–1

Events
Singles	Doubles
RBC Pro Challenge	· 2018 →

This was the first edition of the tournament.

Jessica Pegula and Taylor Townsend won the title, defeating Jamie Loeb and Rebecca Peterson in the final, 6–4, 6–1.

== Seeds ==
1. (United States) Irina Falconi / (Argentina) María Irigoyen (semifinals)
2. (United States) Ashley Weinhold / (United States) Caitlin Whoriskey (semifinals)
3. (United States) Sophie Chang / (United States) Alexandra Mueller (quarterfinals)
4. (United States) Sofia Kenin / (Russia) Anastasiya Komardina (first round)

== Draw ==
=== Key ===
- Q = Qualifier
- WC = Wild card
- LL = Lucky loser
- Alt = Alternate
- SE = Special exempt
- PR = Protected ranking
- ITF = ITF entry
- JE = Junior exempt
- w/o = Walkover
- r = Retired
- d = Defaulted
- SR = Special ranking

First round
(Russia) K Galieva (Bulgaria) S Karatantcheva	5	6	[9]
(Russia) A Gabueva (United States) S Vickery	7	4	[11]
4	(United States) S Kenin (Russia) A Komardina	6	3	[5]
(United States) J Loeb (Sweden) R Peterson	3	6	[10]
(Venezuela) A Uzcátegui (United States) A Zhu	w/o
(Brazil) PC Gonçalves (United States) S Marand
(United States) J Pegula (United States) T Townsend	6	5	[10]
(United Kingdom) JA Asghar (United States) C Kung	2	7	[6]
(Latvia) S Mardarenko (Latvia) I Račika-Račko	2	0
3	(United States) S Chang (United States) A Mueller	6	6
(Norway) U Eikeri (Bulgaria) E Kostova	6	6
(United States) S Abrams (France) J Vulpio	0	3
(United States) K Derienzo (United States) J Robinson	2	3
2	(United States) A Weinhold (United States) C Whoriskey	6	6

Quarterfinals
1	(United States) I Falconi (Argentina) M Irigoyen	6	3
(Russia) A Gabueva (United States) S Vickery	3	0^{r}
(United States) J Loeb (Sweden) R Peterson	6	6
(Venezuela) A Uzcátegui (United States) A Zhu	4	4
(United States) J Pegula (United States) T Townsend	6	4	[10]
3	(United States) S Chang (United States) A Mueller	4	6	[6]
(Norway) U Eikeri (Bulgaria) E Kostova	2	5
2	(United States) A Weinhold (United States) C Whoriskey	6	7

Semifinals
1	(United States) I Falconi (Argentina) M Irigoyen	3	6	[11]
(United States) J Loeb (Sweden) R Peterson	6	3	[13]
(United States) J Pegula (United States) T Townsend	6	6
2	(United States) A Weinhold (United States) C Whoriskey	3	4

Final
(United States) J Loeb (Sweden) R Peterson	4	1
(United States) J Pegula (United States) T Townsend	6	6
