= 2017 RBC Pro Challenge – Singles =

Singles
- 2017 RBC Pro Challenge

Final
- Champion: (United States) Kristie Ahn
- Runner-up: (United States) Danielle Collins
- Score: 6–4, 6–4

Events
Singles	Doubles
RBC Pro Challenge	· 2018 →

This was the first edition of the tournament.

Kristie Ahn won the title, defeating Danielle Collins in the final, 6–4, 6–4.

== Seeds ==
1. (United States) Nicole Gibbs (second round)
2. (United States) Taylor Townsend (quarterfinals)
3. (United States) Sofia Kenin (semifinals)
4. (United States) Kristie Ahn (champion)
5. (United States) Sachia Vickery (first round)
6. (United States) Kayla Day (first round)
7. (United States) Irina Falconi (semifinals)
8. (United States) Julia Boserup (first round)

== Draw ==
Key

- Q = Qualifier
- WC = Wild card
- LL = Lucky loser
- Alt = Alternate
- ITF = ITF entry
- PR = Protected ranking
- SR = Special ranking
- SE = Special exempt
- JE = Junior exempt
- JR = Junior Accelerator Programme entrant
- CO = College Accelerator Programme entrant
- NG = Next Gen Accelerator Program entrant
- w/o = Walkover
- r = Retired
- d = Defaulted

=== Finals ===
Semifinals
(United States) Danielle Collins	6	7^{12}
3	(United States) Sofia Kenin	1	6^{10}
4	(United States) Kristie Ahn	7	6
7	(United States) Irina Falconi	5	3

Final
(United States) Danielle Collins	4	4
4	(United States) Kristie Ahn	6	6

=== Top half ===
First round
1	(United States) N Gibbs	6	6
(United States) G Min	2	2
Q	(United States) A Kratzer	6	7^{7}
(Slovakia) AK Schmiedlová	3	6^{0}
(Norway) U Eikeri	3	6^{5}
(United States) J Loeb	6	7^{7}
(United States) D Collins	6	6^{3}	6
5	(United States) S Vickery	1	7^{7}	4
3	(United States) S Kenin	6	6
Q	(United States) A Rodgers	3	1
Q	(Ukraine) Y Lysa	4	2
(United States) A Anisimova	6	6
(United States) D Lao	4	2
(Turkey) Ç Büyükakçay	6	6
(Bulgaria) S Karatantcheva	6	6
8	(United States) J Boserup	4	3

Second round
1	(United States) N Gibbs	6	5	3
Q	(United States) A Kratzer	2	7	6
(United States) J Loeb	4	3
(United States) D Collins	6	6
3	(United States) S Kenin	6	6
(United States) A Anisimova	4	3
(Turkey) Ç Büyükakçay	6	6
(Bulgaria) S Karatantcheva	2	2

Quarterfinals
Q	(United States) A Kratzer	5	1
(United States) D Collins	7	6
3	(United States) S Kenin	7	6
(Turkey) Ç Büyükakçay	5	4

Semifinals
(United States) D Collins	6	7^{12}
3	(United States) S Kenin	1	6^{10}

=== Bottom half ===
First round
6	(United States) K Day	3	4
SE	(United States) V Duval	6	6
(Bulgaria) E Kostova	7^{8}	6
(United States) UM Arconada	6^{6}	1
WC	(United States) J Pegula	6	6
WC	(United States) A Kiick	2	2
(Russia) A Komardina	3	2
4	(United States) K Ahn	6	6
7	(United States) I Falconi	6	6
WC	(United States) H Chang	4	0
(Sweden) R Peterson	6	6
Q	(United States) C Whoriskey	3	2
WC	(United States) S Chang	6	6
(United States) L Chirico	2	4
(Switzerland) S Vögele	4	3
2	(United States) T Townsend	6	6

Second round
SE	(United States) V Duval	4	7	5
(Bulgaria) E Kostova	6	5	7
WC	(United States) J Pegula	4	3
4	(United States) K Ahn	6	6
7	(United States) I Falconi	6^{3}	6	7
(Sweden) R Peterson	7^{7}	2	5
WC	(United States) S Chang	2	1
2	(United States) T Townsend	6	6

Quarterfinals
(Bulgaria) E Kostova	6	4	2
4	(United States) K Ahn	4	6	6
7	(United States) I Falconi	6	7^{8}
2	(United States) T Townsend	4	6^{6}

Semifinals
4	(United States) K Ahn	7	6
7	(United States) I Falconi	5	3
