= 2017 RBC Pro Challenge =

- Date: 30 October–5 November
- Edition: 1st
- Category: ITF Women's Circuit
- Prize money: $80,000
- Surface: Hard
- Location: Tyler, United States

Champions

Singles
- (United States) Kristie Ahn

Doubles
- (United States) Jessica Pegula / (United States) Taylor Townsend
RBC Pro Challenge	· 2018 →

The 2017 RBC Pro Challenge was a professional tennis tournament played on outdoor hard courts. It was the first edition of the tournament and was part of the 2017 ITF Women's Circuit. It took place in Tyler, United States, on 30 October–5 November 2017.

== Singles main draw entrants ==
=== Seeds ===
Country	Player	Rank^{1}	Seed
USA	Nicole Gibbs	106	1
USA	Taylor Townsend	113	2
USA	Sofia Kenin	114	3
USA	Kristie Ahn	115	4
USA	Sachia Vickery	117	5
USA	Kayla Day	130	6
USA	Irina Falconi	137	7
USA	Julia Boserup	138	8

- ^{1} Rankings as of 23 October 2017.

=== Other entrants ===
The following players received a wildcard into the singles main draw:

- (United States) Hanna Chang
- (United States) Sophie Chang
- (United States) Allie Kiick
- (United States) Jessica Pegula

The following player received entry by a special exempt:

- (United States) Victoria Duval

The following players received entry from the qualifying draw:

- (United States) Ashley Kratzer
- (Ukraine) Yuliya Lysa
- (United States) Amanda Rodgers
- (United States) Caitlin Whoriskey

== Champions ==
=== Singles ===
- (United States) Kristie Ahn def. (United States) Danielle Collins, 6–4, 6–4

=== Doubles ===
- (United States) Jessica Pegula / (United States) Taylor Townsend def. (United States) Jamie Loeb / (Sweden) Rebecca Peterson, 6–4, 6–1
