= 2023 ITF Women's World Tennis Tour (July–September) =

The 2023 ITF Women's World Tennis Tour is the 2023 edition of the second-tier tour for women's professional tennis. It is organised by the International Tennis Federation and is a tier below the WTA Tour. The ITF Women's World Tennis Tour includes tournaments in six categories with prize money ranging from $15,000 up to $100,000.

== Key ==
Category
W100 tournaments
W80 tournaments
W60 tournaments
W40 tournaments
W25 tournaments
W15 tournaments

== Month ==
=== July ===
Week of	Tournament	Winner	Runners-up	Semifinalists	Quarterfinalists
July 3	Open International Féminin de Montpellier; Montpellier, France; Clay; W60; Singles – Doubles	(France) Clara Burel; 6–3, 7–5	(Australia) Astra Sharma	(Greece) Sapfo Sakellaridi (Argentina) Julia Riera	(France) Carole Monnet (Romania) Andreea Mitu; Anastasia Pavlyuchenkova (France) Jenny Lim
July 3	Open International Féminin de Montpellier; Montpellier, France; Clay; W60; Singles – Doubles	Amina Anshba; Sofya Lansere; 6–3, 6–4	(Germany) Julia Lohoff (Romania) Andreea Mitu	(Greece) Sapfo Sakellaridi (Argentina) Julia Riera	(France) Carole Monnet (Romania) Andreea Mitu; Anastasia Pavlyuchenkova (France) Jenny Lim
July 3	Liepāja Open; Liepāja, Latvia; Clay; W60; Singles – Doubles	(Latvia) Darja Semeņistaja; 6–4, 6–4	(United States) Jessie Aney	(Italy) Dalila Spiteri (Romania) Cristina Dinu	(Turkey) İpek Öz (Croatia) Petra Marčinko (Serbia) Dejana Radanović (Malta) Francesca Curmi
July 3	Liepāja Open; Liepāja, Latvia; Clay; W60; Singles – Doubles	(Latvia) Darja Semeņistaja (Latvia) Daniela Vismane; 4–6, 6–2, [10–3]	(Turkey) Çağla Büyükakçay (North Macedonia) Lina Gjorcheska	(Italy) Dalila Spiteri (Romania) Cristina Dinu	(Turkey) İpek Öz (Croatia) Petra Marčinko (Serbia) Dejana Radanović (Malta) Francesca Curmi
July 3	The Hague, Netherlands; Clay; W40; Singles and doubles draws	(Netherlands) Arantxa Rus; 7–6^{(7–3)}, 6–4	(Czech Republic) Sára Bejlek	(Bulgaria) Isabella Shinikova (Netherlands) Eva Vedder	(United States) Louisa Chirico; Julia Avdeeva (Croatia) Lea Bošković (Turkey) Berfu Cengiz
July 3	The Hague, Netherlands; Clay; W40; Singles and doubles draws	(France) Kristina Mladenovic (Netherlands) Arantxa Rus; 6–4, 6–0	(Netherlands) Jasmijn Gimbrère (Netherlands) Isabelle Haverlag	(Bulgaria) Isabella Shinikova (Netherlands) Eva Vedder	(United States) Louisa Chirico; Julia Avdeeva (Croatia) Lea Bošković (Turkey) Berfu Cengiz
July 3	Hong Kong, Hong Kong; Hard; W40; Singles and doubles draws	(China) Wang Yafan; 6–2, 6–3	(Hong Kong) Eudice Chong	(Japan) Aoi Ito (China) Ma Yexin	(South Korea) Han Na-lae; Polina Iatcenko (Japan) Haruka Kaji (China) Wei Sijia
July 3	Hong Kong, Hong Kong; Hard; W40; Singles and doubles draws	(Hong Kong) Eudice Chong (Hong Kong) Cody Wong; 7–5, 6–4	(Japan) Natsumi Kawaguchi (Japan) Kanako Morisaki	(Japan) Aoi Ito (China) Ma Yexin	(South Korea) Han Na-lae; Polina Iatcenko (Japan) Haruka Kaji (China) Wei Sijia
July 3	Getxo, Spain; Clay; W25; Singles and doubles draws	(Australia) Seone Mendez; 6–2, 6–4	(Greece) Martha Matoula	(Spain) Ángela Fita Boluda (Spain) Lucía Cortez Llorca	(Spain) Paula Arias Manjón (France) Amandine Hesse (Italy) Diletta Cherubini (Italy) Jennifer Ruggeri
July 3	Getxo, Spain; Clay; W25; Singles and doubles draws	(Italy) Diletta Cherubini (Czech Republic) Anna Sisková; 6–2, 6–4	(Italy) Nicole Fossa Huergo (Bolivia) Noelia Zeballos	(Spain) Ángela Fita Boluda (Spain) Lucía Cortez Llorca	(Spain) Paula Arias Manjón (France) Amandine Hesse (Italy) Diletta Cherubini (Italy) Jennifer Ruggeri
July 3	Cantanhede, Portugal; Carpet; W25; Singles and doubles draws	(Australia) Kimberly Birrell; 4–6, 6–3, 6–1	(Australia) Arina Rodionova	(Austria) Tamira Paszek; Aliona Falei	(Australia) Petra Hule (France) Yasmine Mansouri (Poland) Katarzyna Kawa (Switzerland) Valentina Ryser
July 3	Cantanhede, Portugal; Carpet; W25; Singles and doubles draws	(Portugal) Francisca Jorge (Portugal) Matilde Jorge; 6–3, 6–3	(United Kingdom) Madeleine Brooks (United Kingdom) Holly Hutchinson	(Austria) Tamira Paszek; Aliona Falei	(Australia) Petra Hule (France) Yasmine Mansouri (Poland) Katarzyna Kawa (Switzerland) Valentina Ryser
July 3	Punta Cana, Dominican Republic; Clay; W25; Singles and doubles draws	(Argentina) Martina Capurro Taborda; 1–6, 6–4, 6–4	Ekaterina Makarova	(Morocco) Yasmine Kabbaj (United States) Raveena Kingsley	(Bosnia and Herzegovina) Nefisa Berberović (United States) Alexa Noel (France) Emma Léné (Spain) Carlota Martínez Círez
July 3	Punta Cana, Dominican Republic; Clay; W25; Singles and doubles draws	(France) Emma Léné (Germany) Emily Seibold; 6–1, 6–2	(United States) Carolyn Ansari (United States) Adeline Flach	(Morocco) Yasmine Kabbaj (United States) Raveena Kingsley	(Bosnia and Herzegovina) Nefisa Berberović (United States) Alexa Noel (France) Emma Léné (Spain) Carlota Martínez Círez
July 3	Klosters, Switzerland; Clay; W25; Singles and doubles draws	(Germany) Lara Schmidt; 6–3, 6–2	Kristina Dmitruk	(Germany) Alexandra Vecic (Romania) Ilona Georgiana Ghioroaie	(Germany) Lena Papadakis (Sweden) Caijsa Hennemann (Czech Republic) Jesika Malečková (Australia) Tina Nadine Smith
July 3	Klosters, Switzerland; Clay; W25; Singles and doubles draws	(Switzerland) Paula Cembranos (Switzerland) Sophie Lüscher; 7–6^{(7–5)}, 3–6, [14–12]	Kristina Dmitruk (India) Prarthana Thombare	(Germany) Alexandra Vecic (Romania) Ilona Georgiana Ghioroaie	(Germany) Lena Papadakis (Sweden) Caijsa Hennemann (Czech Republic) Jesika Malečková (Australia) Tina Nadine Smith
July 3	Nakhon Si Thammarat, Thailand; Hard; W25; Singles and doubles draws	(Thailand) Mananchaya Sawangkaew; 6–4, 6–0	(India) Sahaja Yamalapalli	(Thailand) Peangtarn Plipuech (Thailand) Luksika Kumkhum	(South Korea) Lee Gyeong-seo (Japan) Erika Sema (South Korea) Park So-hyun (Thailand) Anchisa Chanta
July 3	Nakhon Si Thammarat, Thailand; Hard; W25; Singles and doubles draws	(India) Rutuja Bhosale (Japan) Erika Sema; 7–6^{(7–3)}, 6–1	(India) Shrivalli Bhamidipaty (India) Vaidehi Chaudhari	(Thailand) Peangtarn Plipuech (Thailand) Luksika Kumkhum	(South Korea) Lee Gyeong-seo (Japan) Erika Sema (South Korea) Park So-hyun (Thailand) Anchisa Chanta
July 3	Stuttgart, Germany; Clay; W25; Singles and doubles draws	(Germany) Ella Seidel; 6–3, 6–1	(Germany) Julia Middendorf	(Japan) Yuki Naito (Romania) Alexandra Cadanțu-Ignatik	(Bosnia and Herzegovina) Dea Herdželaš (Spain) Rosa Vicens Mas (Croatia) Tena Lukas (Romania) Miriam Bulgaru
July 3	Stuttgart, Germany; Clay; W25; Singles and doubles draws	(Japan) Mana Kawamura (Japan) Yuki Naito; 6–2, 6–7^{(4–7)}, [10–7]	(Czech Republic) Denisa Hindová (Czech Republic) Karolína Kubáňová	(Japan) Yuki Naito (Romania) Alexandra Cadanțu-Ignatik	(Bosnia and Herzegovina) Dea Herdželaš (Spain) Rosa Vicens Mas (Croatia) Tena Lukas (Romania) Miriam Bulgaru
July 3	Tianjin, China; Hard; W15; Singles and doubles draws	(China) Yuan Chengyiyi; 4–6, 6–4, 6–4	(China) Ren Yufei	(China) Li Jiayou (China) Cai Xinyu	(Canada) Annabelle Xu (China) Shi Han (Thailand) Thasaporn Naklo (China) Dong Na
July 3	Tianjin, China; Hard; W15; Singles and doubles draws	(China) Wang Jiaqi (China) Yang Yidi; 7–5, 6–4	(China) Liu Yanni (China) Yao Xinxin	(China) Li Jiayou (China) Cai Xinyu	(Canada) Annabelle Xu (China) Shi Han (Thailand) Thasaporn Naklo (China) Dong Na
July 3	Monastir, Tunisia; Hard; W15; Singles and doubles draws	(Italy) Camilla Zanolini; 4–6, 6–4, 6–2	(Egypt) Lamis Alhussein Abdel Aziz	(Slovakia) Katarína Kužmová (United Kingdom) Amelia Bissett	(Tunisia) Chiraz Bechri; Elizaveta Shebekina (Spain) Lucía Llinares Domingo (Japan) Ayumi Koshiishi
July 3	Monastir, Tunisia; Hard; W15; Singles and doubles draws	(Slovakia) Salma Drugdová (Slovakia) Katarína Kužmová; Walkover	Aglaya Fedorova; Elizaveta Shebekina	(Slovakia) Katarína Kužmová (United Kingdom) Amelia Bissett	(Tunisia) Chiraz Bechri; Elizaveta Shebekina (Spain) Lucía Llinares Domingo (Japan) Ayumi Koshiishi
July 3	Lakewood, United States; Hard; W15; Singles and doubles draws	(United States) Hanna Chang; 1–1 ret.	(United States) Mary Stoiana	(United States) Savannah Broadus (United States) Eryn Cayetano	(United States) Brandy Walker (United States) Kelly Keller (United States) Qavia Lopez (United States) Emma Charney
July 3	Lakewood, United States; Hard; W15; Singles and doubles draws	(United States) Fiona Crawley (United States) Mary Stoiana; 7–5, 6–7^{(3–7)}, [10–5]	(United States) Mary Lewis (United States) Brandy Walker	(United States) Savannah Broadus (United States) Eryn Cayetano	(United States) Brandy Walker (United States) Kelly Keller (United States) Qavia Lopez (United States) Emma Charney
July 10	Torneo Internazionale Femminile Antico Tiro a Volo; Rome, Italy; Clay; W60; Singles – Doubles	(Spain) Jéssica Bouzas Maneiro; 6–2, 6–4	(Cyprus) Raluca Șerban	(Italy) Jennifer Ruggeri (North Macedonia) Lina Gjorcheska	(Spain) Irene Burillo Escorihuela (Italy) Matilde Paoletti (Australia) Seone Mendez (Australia) Destanee Aiava
July 10	Torneo Internazionale Femminile Antico Tiro a Volo; Rome, Italy; Clay; W60; Singles – Doubles	Yuliya Hatouka (Kazakhstan) Zhibek Kulambayeva; 6–4, 6–4	(Colombia) Yuliana Lizarazo (Colombia) María Paulina Pérez	(Italy) Jennifer Ruggeri (North Macedonia) Lina Gjorcheska	(Spain) Irene Burillo Escorihuela (Italy) Matilde Paoletti (Australia) Seone Mendez (Australia) Destanee Aiava
July 10	Amstelveen Women's Open; Amstelveen, Netherlands; Clay; W60; Singles – Doubles	(Estonia) Kaia Kanepi; 6–2, 7–6^{(7–5)}	(Serbia) Lola Radivojević	(Czech Republic) Brenda Fruhvirtová (Germany) Noma Noha Akugue	(France) Alice Robbe (Netherlands) Anouk Koevermans (Switzerland) Ylena In-Albon (France) Océane Dodin
July 10	Amstelveen Women's Open; Amstelveen, Netherlands; Clay; W60; Singles – Doubles	(Germany) Noma Noha Akugue (Luxembourg) Marie Weckerle; 7–5, 6–3	(Turkey) Ayla Aksu (Croatia) Ena Kajević	(Czech Republic) Brenda Fruhvirtová (Germany) Noma Noha Akugue	(France) Alice Robbe (Netherlands) Anouk Koevermans (Switzerland) Ylena In-Albon (France) Océane Dodin
July 10	Saskatoon Challenger; Saskatoon, Canada; Hard; W60; Singles – Doubles	(Canada) Victoria Mboko; 6–4, 6–4	(United States) Emina Bektas	(Serbia) Katarina Kozarov (United States) Grace Min	(United States) Alana Smith (Canada) Stacey Fung (Mexico) Renata Zarazúa (Canada) Kayla Cross
July 10	Saskatoon Challenger; Saskatoon, Canada; Hard; W60; Singles – Doubles	(United States) Abigail Rencheli (United States) Alana Smith; 4–6, 6–4, [10–7]	(Canada) Stacey Fung (India) Karman Thandi	(Serbia) Katarina Kozarov (United States) Grace Min	(United States) Alana Smith (Canada) Stacey Fung (Mexico) Renata Zarazúa (Canada) Kayla Cross
July 10	Punta Cana, Dominican Republic; Clay; W25; Singles and doubles draws	(Spain) Carlota Martínez Círez; 6–3, 6–3	Ekaterina Makarova	(Argentina) Solana Sierra (Bulgaria) Gergana Topalova	(United States) Raveena Kingsley (United States) Rachel Gailis (Argentina) Martina Capurro Taborda (Mexico) Ana Sofía Sánchez
July 10	Punta Cana, Dominican Republic; Clay; W25; Singles and doubles draws	(United States) Victoria Osuigwe (United States) Whitney Osuigwe; 6–1, 1–6, [10–7]	(Spain) Alicia Herrero Liñana (Argentina) Melany Solange Krywoj	(Argentina) Solana Sierra (Bulgaria) Gergana Topalova	(United States) Raveena Kingsley (United States) Rachel Gailis (Argentina) Martina Capurro Taborda (Mexico) Ana Sofía Sánchez
July 10	Corroios, Portugal; Hard; W25; Singles and doubles draws	(China) Gao Xinyu; 6–2, 6–3	Aliona Falei	Anastasia Zakharova; Valeria Savinykh	(Australia) Talia Gibson (United Kingdom) Katy Dunne (South Korea) Park So-hyun (Australia) Maddison Inglis
July 10	Corroios, Portugal; Hard; W25; Singles and doubles draws	(Australia) Talia Gibson (Australia) Petra Hule; 6–3, 3–6, [10–6]	(Belgium) Sofia Costoulas (Switzerland) Lulu Sun	Anastasia Zakharova; Valeria Savinykh	(Australia) Talia Gibson (United Kingdom) Katy Dunne (South Korea) Park So-hyun (Australia) Maddison Inglis
July 10	Naiman, China; Hard; W25; Singles and doubles draws	(China) Li Zongyu; 6–4, 6–2	(China) You Xiaodi	(China) Yao Xinxin (China) Lu Jiajing	(China) Feng Shuo (China) Wu Meixu (Chinese Taipei) Tsao Chia-yi (Chinese Taipei) Yang Ya-yi
July 10	Naiman, China; Hard; W25; Singles and doubles draws	(China) Feng Shuo (China) Wu Meixu; 1–6, 6–3, [10–5]	(China) Dang Yiming (China) You Xiaodi	(China) Yao Xinxin (China) Lu Jiajing	(China) Feng Shuo (China) Wu Meixu (Chinese Taipei) Tsao Chia-yi (Chinese Taipei) Yang Ya-yi
July 10	Don Benito, Spain; Carpet; W25; Singles and doubles draws	(Austria) Tamira Paszek; 7–6^{(9–7)}, 6–7^{(5–7)}, 7–6^{(7–3)}	(Switzerland) Valentina Ryser	(Turkey) Zeynep Sönmez (Chinese Taipei) Joanna Garland	Polina Iatcenko (Turkey) Pemra Özgen (Lithuania) Justina Mikulskytė (Latvia) Diāna Marcinkēviča
July 10	Don Benito, Spain; Carpet; W25; Singles and doubles draws	(Colombia) María Herazo González (Peru) Anastasia Iamachkine; 7–6^{(10–8)}, 6–3	(Spain) Lucía Cortez Llorca (Spain) Olga Parres Azcoitia	(Turkey) Zeynep Sönmez (Chinese Taipei) Joanna Garland	Polina Iatcenko (Turkey) Pemra Özgen (Lithuania) Justina Mikulskytė (Latvia) Diāna Marcinkēviča
July 10	Aschaffenburg, Germany; Clay; W25; Singles and doubles draws	(Belgium) Marie Benoît; 6–3, 6–3	(Czech Republic) Julie Štruplová	(Belgium) Hanne Vandewinkel (Greece) Sapfo Sakellaridi	Elena Pridankina (Switzerland) Jenny Dürst (Czech Republic) Ivana Šebestová (Czech Republic) Aneta Kučmová
July 10	Aschaffenburg, Germany; Clay; W25; Singles and doubles draws	Elena Pridankina (Czech Republic) Ivana Šebestová; 2–6, 6–2, [10–5]	(France) Manon Léonard (France) Lucie Nguyen Tan	(Belgium) Hanne Vandewinkel (Greece) Sapfo Sakellaridi	Elena Pridankina (Switzerland) Jenny Dürst (Czech Republic) Ivana Šebestová (Czech Republic) Aneta Kučmová
July 10	Nakhon Si Thammarat, Thailand; Hard; W15; Singles and doubles draws	(Thailand) Anchisa Chanta; 4–6, 7–5, 6–1	(Thailand) Patcharin Cheapchandej	(Thailand) Lanlana Tararudee (South Korea) Back Da-yeon	(Thailand) Punnin Kovapitukted (United States) Dasha Ivanova (New Zealand) Monique Barry (Northern Mariana Islands) Carol Young Suh Lee
July 10	Nakhon Si Thammarat, Thailand; Hard; W15; Singles and doubles draws	(New Zealand) Monique Barry (India) Shrivalli Bhamidipaty; 6–3, 7–6^{(7–3)}	(Thailand) Punnin Kovapitukted (Thailand) Supapitch Kuearum	(Thailand) Lanlana Tararudee (South Korea) Back Da-yeon	(Thailand) Punnin Kovapitukted (United States) Dasha Ivanova (New Zealand) Monique Barry (Northern Mariana Islands) Carol Young Suh Lee
July 10	Bacău, Romania; Clay; W15; Singles and doubles draws	(Belgium) Amelie Van Impe; 6–2, 6–1	(Romania) Maria Sara Popa	(Lithuania) Patricija Paukštytė (Finland) Laura Hietaranta	(Romania) Simona Ogescu (Romania) Ștefania Bojică (Romania) Patricia Maria Țig (Italy) Giulia Carbonaro
July 10	Bacău, Romania; Clay; W15; Singles and doubles draws	(Romania) Ștefania Bojică (Lithuania) Patricija Paukštytė; Walkover	(Italy) Melania Delai (Italy) Greta Schieroni	(Lithuania) Patricija Paukštytė (Finland) Laura Hietaranta	(Romania) Simona Ogescu (Romania) Ștefania Bojică (Romania) Patricia Maria Țig (Italy) Giulia Carbonaro
July 10	Monastir, Tunisia; Hard; W15; Singles and doubles draws	(Japan) Ayumi Koshiishi; 6–0 ret.	(Italy) Camilla Zanolini	Vlada Mincheva (Italy) Lara Pfeifer	(Slovakia) Salma Drugdová (France) Marie Villet (France) Karine Marion Job (Slovakia) Katarína Kužmová
July 10	Monastir, Tunisia; Hard; W15; Singles and doubles draws	(France) Beverley Nyangon (Kenya) Angella Okutoyi; 6–4, 3–6, [10–2]	(Italy) Samira De Stefano (Italy) Gaia Parravicini	Vlada Mincheva (Italy) Lara Pfeifer	(Slovakia) Salma Drugdová (France) Marie Villet (France) Karine Marion Job (Slovakia) Katarína Kužmová
July 10	Lakewood, United States; Hard; W15; Singles and doubles draws	(United States) Reese Brantmeier; 6–4, 6–4	(United States) Haley Giavara	(United States) Anne Christine Lutkemeyer Obregon (United States) Malkia Ngounoue	(United States) Anna Campana (United States) Savannah Broadus (Japan) Rinon Okuwaki (United States) Kate Fakih
July 10	Lakewood, United States; Hard; W15; Singles and doubles draws	(United States) Savannah Broadus (Ukraine) Anita Sahdiieva; 6–3, 6–3	(United States) Reese Brantmeier (United States) Fiona Crawley	(United States) Anne Christine Lutkemeyer Obregon (United States) Malkia Ngounoue	(United States) Anna Campana (United States) Savannah Broadus (Japan) Rinon Okuwaki (United States) Kate Fakih
July 17	Open Araba en Femenino; Vitoria-Gasteiz, Spain; Hard; W100; Singles – Doubles	(Ukraine) Daria Snigur; 3–6, 6–4, 6–1	(France) Jessika Ponchet	(China) Bai Zhuoxuan (Philippines) Alex Eala	(United Kingdom) Jodie Burrage (Spain) Marina Bassols Ribera; Valeria Savinykh (Spain) Lucía Cortez Llorca
July 17	Open Araba en Femenino; Vitoria-Gasteiz, Spain; Hard; W100; Singles – Doubles	(United Kingdom) Alicia Barnett (United Kingdom) Olivia Nicholls; 6–3, 6–4	(France) Estelle Cascino (Latvia) Diāna Marcinkēviča	(China) Bai Zhuoxuan (Philippines) Alex Eala	(United Kingdom) Jodie Burrage (Spain) Marina Bassols Ribera; Valeria Savinykh (Spain) Lucía Cortez Llorca
July 17	Championnats Banque Nationale de Granby; Granby, Canada; Hard; W100; Singles – Doubles	(United States) Kayla Day; 6–4, 2–6, 7–5	(Canada) Katherine Sebov	(Canada) Rebecca Marino (United States) Ashlyn Krueger	(Canada) Marina Stakusic (United States) Emina Bektas (Canada) Cadence Brace (Japan) Himeno Sakatsume
July 17	Championnats Banque Nationale de Granby; Granby, Canada; Hard; W100; Singles – Doubles	(Mexico) Marcela Zacarías (Mexico) Renata Zarazúa; 6–3, 6–3	(United States) Carmen Corley (United States) Ivana Corley	(Canada) Rebecca Marino (United States) Ashlyn Krueger	(Canada) Marina Stakusic (United States) Emina Bektas (Canada) Cadence Brace (Japan) Himeno Sakatsume
July 17	The Women's Hospital Classic; Evansville, United States; Hard; W60; Singles – Doubles	(India) Karman Thandi; 7–5, 4–6, 6–1	(Ukraine) Yulia Starodubtseva	(United States) Madison Brengle (United States) McCartney Kessler	(Bosnia and Herzegovina) Nefisa Berberović; Veronika Miroshnichenko (United States) Allie Kiick (United States) Ashley Lahey
July 17	The Women's Hospital Classic; Evansville, United States; Hard; W60; Singles – Doubles	Maria Kononova; Veronika Miroshnichenko; 6–3, 2–6, [10–8]	(United States) McCartney Kessler (Ukraine) Yulia Starodubtseva	(United States) Madison Brengle (United States) McCartney Kessler	(Bosnia and Herzegovina) Nefisa Berberović; Veronika Miroshnichenko (United States) Allie Kiick (United States) Ashley Lahey
July 17	ITS Cup; Olomouc, Czech Republic; Clay; W60; Singles – Doubles	(Latvia) Darja Semeņistaja; 6–7^{(6–8)}, 6–3, 6–1	(Croatia) Lea Bošković	(Romania) Alexandra Cadanțu-Ignatik (France) Sara Cakarevic	(Spain) Leyre Romero Gormaz (Czech Republic) Tereza Valentová (Belgium) Marie Benoît; Yuliya Hatouka
July 17	ITS Cup; Olomouc, Czech Republic; Clay; W60; Singles – Doubles	(Czech Republic) Magdaléna Smékalová (Czech Republic) Tereza Valentová; 6–2, 6–2	(Kazakhstan) Zhibek Kulambayeva (Latvia) Darja Semeņistaja	(Romania) Alexandra Cadanțu-Ignatik (France) Sara Cakarevic	(Spain) Leyre Romero Gormaz (Czech Republic) Tereza Valentová (Belgium) Marie Benoît; Yuliya Hatouka
July 17	Porto, Portugal; Hard; W40; Singles and doubles draws	(Bulgaria) Isabella Shinikova; 6–4, 7–5	(France) Kristina Mladenovic	(Netherlands) Arianne Hartono (Australia) Arina Rodionova	(France) Harmony Tan; Maria Bondarenko (Switzerland) Lulu Sun (China) Gao Xinyu
July 17	Porto, Portugal; Hard; W40; Singles and doubles draws	(Australia) Gabriella Da Silva-Fick (Australia) Alexandra Osborne; 6–4, 6–3	(Portugal) Francisca Jorge (Portugal) Matilde Jorge	(Netherlands) Arianne Hartono (Australia) Arina Rodionova	(France) Harmony Tan; Maria Bondarenko (Switzerland) Lulu Sun (China) Gao Xinyu
July 17	Pärnu, Estonia; Clay; W25; Singles and doubles draws	(Czech Republic) Sára Bejlek; 7–5, 6–4	(Croatia) Lucija Ćirić Bagarić	(Estonia) Maileen Nuudi (Finland) Laura Hietaranta	(Greece) Martha Matoula (Estonia) Elena Malõgina (Switzerland) Jenny Dürst (Turkey) İlay Yörük
July 17	Pärnu, Estonia; Clay; W25; Singles and doubles draws	(Italy) Nicole Fossa Huergo (Germany) Luisa Meyer auf der Heide; 7–5, 7–5	(Croatia) Lucija Ćirić Bagarić (Switzerland) Jenny Dürst	(Estonia) Maileen Nuudi (Finland) Laura Hietaranta	(Greece) Martha Matoula (Estonia) Elena Malõgina (Switzerland) Jenny Dürst (Turkey) İlay Yörük
July 17	Roehampton, United Kingdom; Hard; W25; Singles and doubles draws	(United States) Asia Muhammad; 6–2, 1–0 ret.	(South Korea) Park So-hyun	(Japan) Naho Sato (United Kingdom) Amarni Banks	(United Kingdom) Katy Dunne (Germany) Alexandra Vecic (United Kingdom) Alice Gillan (United Kingdom) Anna Brogan
July 17	Roehampton, United Kingdom; Hard; W25; Singles and doubles draws	(India) Rutuja Bhosale (United Kingdom) Sarah Beth Grey; 0–6, 6–4, [10–4]	(United Kingdom) Madeleine Brooks (United Kingdom) Holly Hutchinson	(Japan) Naho Sato (United Kingdom) Amarni Banks	(United Kingdom) Katy Dunne (Germany) Alexandra Vecic (United Kingdom) Alice Gillan (United Kingdom) Anna Brogan
July 17	Darmstadt, Germany; Clay; W25; Singles and doubles draws	(Croatia) Tena Lukas; 6–3, 6–4	(Serbia) Lola Radivojević	(Italy) Tatiana Pieri (United States) Chiara Scholl	(Germany) Nicole Rivkin (Germany) Carolina Kuhl; Elena Pridankina (Japan) Yuki Naito
July 17	Darmstadt, Germany; Clay; W25; Singles and doubles draws	(Czech Republic) Michaela Bayerlová (Australia) Alana Parnaby; 7–5, 6–4	(Romania) Arina Gabriela Vasilescu; Anastasia Zolotareva	(Italy) Tatiana Pieri (United States) Chiara Scholl	(Germany) Nicole Rivkin (Germany) Carolina Kuhl; Elena Pridankina (Japan) Yuki Naito
July 17	Les Contamines-Montjoie, France; Hard; W15; Singles and doubles draws	(Germany) Selina Dal; 6–2, 6–3	(France) Emmanuelle Girard	(Japan) Michika Ozeki (Switzerland) Sandy Marti	(France) Astrid Cirotte (France) Jenny Lim (United Kingdom) Matilda Mutavdzic (France) Chloé Noël
July 17	Les Contamines-Montjoie, France; Hard; W15; Singles and doubles draws	(France) Astrid Cirotte (France) Marine Szostak; 6–3, 3–6, [10–7]	(Republic of Ireland) Celine Simunyu (Switzerland) Katerina Tsygourova	(Japan) Michika Ozeki (Switzerland) Sandy Marti	(France) Astrid Cirotte (France) Jenny Lim (United Kingdom) Matilda Mutavdzic (France) Chloé Noël
July 17	Nakhon Si Thammarat, Thailand; Hard; W15; Singles and doubles draws	(Thailand) Lanlana Tararudee; 6–4, 6–4	(South Korea) Back Da-yeon	(Thailand) Punnin Kovapitukted (Thailand) Patcharin Cheapchandej	(Japan) Hikaru Sato (South Korea) Ahn Yu-jin (Japan) Honoka Kobayashi (Netherlands) Marente Sijbesma
July 17	Nakhon Si Thammarat, Thailand; Hard; W15; Singles and doubles draws	(Japan) Anri Nagata (Japan) Kisa Yoshioka; 4–6, 6–2, [10–6]	(Thailand) Yatawee Chimcham (Thailand) Lunda Kumhom	(Thailand) Punnin Kovapitukted (Thailand) Patcharin Cheapchandej	(Japan) Hikaru Sato (South Korea) Ahn Yu-jin (Japan) Honoka Kobayashi (Netherlands) Marente Sijbesma
July 17	Casablanca, Morocco; Clay; W15; Singles and doubles draws	(Netherlands) Merel Hoedt; 6–3, 6–2	(Serbia) Andrea Obradović	(Italy) Vittoria Modesti (France) Tiantsoa Sarah Rakotomanga Rajaonah	(Italy) Samira De Stefano (Morocco) Aya El Aouni; Alexandra Shubladze (Italy) Federica Urgesi
July 17	Casablanca, Morocco; Clay; W15; Singles and doubles draws	(France) Astrid Lew Yan Foon (Switzerland) Marie Mettraux; 7–6^{(7–4)}, 7–6^{(7–5)}	(Italy) Alessandra Teodosescu (Italy) Federica Urgesi	(Italy) Vittoria Modesti (France) Tiantsoa Sarah Rakotomanga Rajaonah	(Italy) Samira De Stefano (Morocco) Aya El Aouni; Alexandra Shubladze (Italy) Federica Urgesi
July 17	Monastir, Tunisia; Hard; W15; Singles and doubles draws	(Japan) Ayumi Koshiishi; 6–4, 6–2	(United States) Sofia Camila Rojas	(Slovakia) Katarína Kužmová (Italy) Cristina Elena Tiglea	(France) Helena Stevic (France) Sophia Biolay (Kenya) Angella Okutoyi (Slovakia) Salma Drugdová
July 17	Monastir, Tunisia; Hard; W15; Singles and doubles draws	(Romania) Vanessa Popa Teiușanu (Romania) Ioana Zvonaru; 6–2, 6–3	(Australia) Ella Simmons (Australia) Belle Thompson	(Slovakia) Katarína Kužmová (Italy) Cristina Elena Tiglea	(France) Helena Stevic (France) Sophia Biolay (Kenya) Angella Okutoyi (Slovakia) Salma Drugdová
July 24	Figueira da Foz International Ladies Open; Figueira da Foz, Portugal; Hard; W100; Singles – Doubles	Alina Korneeva; 6–0, 6–0	(France) Carole Monnet	(Portugal) Francisca Jorge (France) Harmony Tan	(United Kingdom) Sarah Beth Grey (United Kingdom) Yuriko Miyazaki (China) Bai Zhuoxuan (Switzerland) Ylena In-Albon
July 24	Figueira da Foz International Ladies Open; Figueira da Foz, Portugal; Hard; W100; Singles – Doubles	(Hong Kong) Eudice Chong (Netherlands) Arianne Hartono; 6–3, 6–2	Alina Korneeva; Anastasia Tikhonova	(Portugal) Francisca Jorge (France) Harmony Tan	(United Kingdom) Sarah Beth Grey (United Kingdom) Yuriko Miyazaki (China) Bai Zhuoxuan (Switzerland) Ylena In-Albon
July 24	Dallas Summer Series; Dallas, United States; Hard (indoor); W60; Singles – Doubles	(Ukraine) Yulia Starodubtseva; 3–6, 6–2, 6–2	(China) Wang Yafan	(China) Ma Yexin (United States) Mary Stoiana	(United States) Madison Brengle (Mexico) Renata Zarazúa (Japan) Himeno Sakatsume (United States) Makenna Jones
July 24	Dallas Summer Series; Dallas, United States; Hard (indoor); W60; Singles – Doubles	(United States) Sophie Chang (United States) Ashley Lahey; 6–2, 6–2	(United States) Makenna Jones (United States) Jamie Loeb	(China) Ma Yexin (United States) Mary Stoiana	(United States) Madison Brengle (Mexico) Renata Zarazúa (Japan) Himeno Sakatsume (United States) Makenna Jones
July 24	Horb am Neckar, Germany; Clay; W25; Singles and doubles draws	(Slovenia) Veronika Erjavec; 5–7, 6–2, 6–3	(Germany) Anna Gabric	(Latvia) Daniela Vismane (United States) Vivian Wolff	(Germany) Sina Herrmann (Germany) Chantal Sauvant (Georgia (country)) Ekaterine Gorgodze; Darya Astakhova
July 24	Horb am Neckar, Germany; Clay; W25; Singles and doubles draws	Darya Astakhova (Latvia) Daniela Vismane; 6–3, 6–2	(Germany) Laura Böhner (Argentina) Berta Bonardi	(Latvia) Daniela Vismane (United States) Vivian Wolff	(Germany) Sina Herrmann (Germany) Chantal Sauvant (Georgia (country)) Ekaterine Gorgodze; Darya Astakhova
July 24	Open Castilla y León; El Espinar, Spain; Hard; W25; Singles and doubles draws	Maria Bondarenko; 6–7^{(4–7)}, 6–0, 6–0	Ekaterina Reyngold	Polina Iatcenko (Mexico) Ana Sofía Sánchez	(Spain) Paula Arias Manjón; Anastasia Kovaleva (Japan) Ena Shibahara (Switzerland) Sebastianna Scilipoti
July 24	Open Castilla y León; El Espinar, Spain; Hard; W25; Singles and doubles draws	(United States) Rasheeda Mcadoo (Australia) Alexandra Osborne; 6–4, 6–3	(South Korea) Ku Yeon-woo (Latvia) Diāna Marcinkēviča	Polina Iatcenko (Mexico) Ana Sofía Sánchez	(Spain) Paula Arias Manjón; Anastasia Kovaleva (Japan) Ena Shibahara (Switzerland) Sebastianna Scilipoti
July 24	Bragado, Argentina; Clay; W25; Singles and doubles draws	(Argentina) Martina Capurro Taborda; 6–4, 6–1	(Argentina) Solana Sierra	(Argentina) Melany Solange Krywoj (Mexico) Victoria Rodríguez	(Argentina) Candela Vázquez (Argentina) Sol Ailin Larraya Guidi (Peru) Romina Ccuno (Argentina) Guillermina Naya
July 24	Bragado, Argentina; Clay; W25; Singles and doubles draws	(Peru) Romina Ccuno (Mexico) Victoria Rodríguez; 6–2, 6–3	(Argentina) Luciana Moyano (Argentina) Candela Vázquez	(Argentina) Melany Solange Krywoj (Mexico) Victoria Rodríguez	(Argentina) Candela Vázquez (Argentina) Sol Ailin Larraya Guidi (Peru) Romina Ccuno (Argentina) Guillermina Naya
July 24	Sapporo, Japan; Clay; W15; Singles and doubles draws	(Thailand) Thasaporn Naklo; 6–1, 6–2	(Japan) Mei Hasegawa	(Japan) Natsuki Yoshimoto (Japan) Ayumi Miyamoto	(Japan) Hiromi Abe (Japan) Miyu Nakashima (South Korea) Ahn Yu-jin (Japan) Mio Mushika
July 24	Sapporo, Japan; Clay; W15; Singles and doubles draws	(Japan) Ayumi Miyamoto (Thailand) Thasaporn Naklo; 6–2, 6–4	(China) Han Jiangxue (Japan) Mao Mushika	(Japan) Natsuki Yoshimoto (Japan) Ayumi Miyamoto	(Japan) Hiromi Abe (Japan) Miyu Nakashima (South Korea) Ahn Yu-jin (Japan) Mio Mushika
July 24	Caloundra, Australia; Hard; W15; Singles and doubles draws	(Turkey) Melisa Ercan; 6–2, 7–5	(Australia) Stefani Webb	(Australia) Ashlee Narker (Australia) Laquisa Khan	(Australia) Ashleigh Simes (Australia) Nithesa Selvaraj (Australia) Gabrielle Villegas (Australia) Lara Walker
July 24	Caloundra, Australia; Hard; W15; Singles and doubles draws	(Australia) Alicia Smith (Australia) Stefani Webb; 6–1, 6–2	(Japan) Nanari Katsumi (Australia) Zara Larke	(Australia) Ashlee Narker (Australia) Laquisa Khan	(Australia) Ashleigh Simes (Australia) Nithesa Selvaraj (Australia) Gabrielle Villegas (Australia) Lara Walker
July 24	Vejle, Denmark; Clay; W15; Singles and doubles draws	(Denmark) Rebecca Munk Mortensen; 6–3, 3–6, 6–0	(Finland) Laura Hietaranta	(Denmark) Hannah Viller Møller (Germany) Nicole Rivkin	(Germany) Jantje Tilbürger (Greece) Eleni Christofi (Italy) Jessica Bertoldo; Anna Zyryanova
July 24	Vejle, Denmark; Clay; W15; Singles and doubles draws	(Ukraine) Anastasiya Soboleva (Ukraine) Daria Yesypchuk; 7–5, 7–6^{(7–3)}	(Denmark) Rebecca Munk Mortensen (Denmark) Hannah Viller Møller	(Denmark) Hannah Viller Møller (Germany) Nicole Rivkin	(Germany) Jantje Tilbürger (Greece) Eleni Christofi (Italy) Jessica Bertoldo; Anna Zyryanova
July 24	Monastir, Tunisia; Hard; W15; Singles and doubles draws	(Kenya) Angella Okutoyi; 6–2, 7–6^{(7–2)}	(United States) Isabella Harvison	(India) Zeel Desai (Romania) Alexandra Iordache	(Italy) Anastasia Abbagnato (France) Marie Villet (Italy) Verena Meliss (France) Caroline Roméo
July 24	Monastir, Tunisia; Hard; W15; Singles and doubles draws	(Italy) Anastasia Abbagnato (Italy) Virginia Ferrara; 3–6, 7–5, [10–8]	(Ukraine) Oleksandra Korashvili (Italy) Gaia Parravicini	(India) Zeel Desai (Romania) Alexandra Iordache	(Italy) Anastasia Abbagnato (France) Marie Villet (Italy) Verena Meliss (France) Caroline Roméo
July 24	Casablanca, Morocco; Clay; W15; Singles and doubles draws	(Morocco) Yasmine Kabbaj; 6–2, 6–2	(Italy) Sofia Rocchetti	(Switzerland) Alina Granwehr (Morocco) Aya El Aouni	(Switzerland) Marie Mettraux (Netherlands) Merel Hoedt (France) Tiantsoa Sarah Rakotomanga Rajaonah (Serbia) Andrea Obradović
July 24	Casablanca, Morocco; Clay; W15; Singles and doubles draws	(Netherlands) Merel Hoedt (Netherlands) Demi Tran; 3–6, 6–2, [10–4]	(Morocco) Manal Ennaciri (Morocco) Salma Loudili	(Switzerland) Alina Granwehr (Morocco) Aya El Aouni	(Switzerland) Marie Mettraux (Netherlands) Merel Hoedt (France) Tiantsoa Sarah Rakotomanga Rajaonah (Serbia) Andrea Obradović
July 31	Engie Open Feira de Santana; Feira de Santana, Brazil; Hard; W60; Singles – Doubles	(Brazil) Laura Pigossi; 6–1, 6–4	Jana Kolodynska	(United States) Haley Giavara (United Kingdom) Eden Silva	(Ukraine) Valeriya Strakhova (United States) Varvara Lepchenko (United States) Raveena Kingsley (France) Léolia Jeanjean
July 31	Engie Open Feira de Santana; Feira de Santana, Brazil; Hard; W60; Singles – Doubles	(France) Léolia Jeanjean (Ukraine) Valeriya Strakhova; 7–5, 6–4	(United States) Haley Giavara (United States) Abigail Rencheli	(United States) Haley Giavara (United Kingdom) Eden Silva	(Ukraine) Valeriya Strakhova (United States) Varvara Lepchenko (United States) Raveena Kingsley (France) Léolia Jeanjean
July 31	Internazionali di Tennis del Friuli Venezia Giulia; Cordenons, Italy; Clay; W60; Singles – Doubles	(Slovenia) Veronika Erjavec; 6–3, 6–4	(Romania) Alexandra Cadanțu-Ignatik	(Italy) Dalila Spiteri (Hungary) Fanny Stollár	(France) Tessah Andrianjafitrimo (United Kingdom) Emily Appleton (Italy) Camilla Rosatello (Burundi) Sada Nahimana
July 31	Internazionali di Tennis del Friuli Venezia Giulia; Cordenons, Italy; Clay; W60; Singles – Doubles	(Italy) Angelica Moratelli (Italy) Camilla Rosatello; 0–6, 6–2, [10–5]	(Netherlands) Isabelle Haverlag (Netherlands) Eva Vedder	(Italy) Dalila Spiteri (Hungary) Fanny Stollár	(France) Tessah Andrianjafitrimo (United Kingdom) Emily Appleton (Italy) Camilla Rosatello (Burundi) Sada Nahimana
July 31	Ladies Open Hechingen; Hechingen, Germany; Clay; W60; Singles – Doubles	(Czech Republic) Brenda Fruhvirtová; 6–3, 6–1	(Slovenia) Živa Falkner	(Hungary) Anna Bondár (Spain) Jéssica Bouzas Maneiro	Sofya Lansere (Germany) Alexandra Vecic (Greece) Sapfo Sakellaridi (Germany) Julia Middendorf
July 31	Ladies Open Hechingen; Hechingen, Germany; Clay; W60; Singles – Doubles	Alena Fomina-Klotz (North Macedonia) Lina Gjorcheska; 6–2, 6–4	(Georgia (country)) Ekaterine Gorgodze (Germany) Katharina Hobgarski	(Hungary) Anna Bondár (Spain) Jéssica Bouzas Maneiro	Sofya Lansere (Germany) Alexandra Vecic (Greece) Sapfo Sakellaridi (Germany) Julia Middendorf
July 31	Lexington Challenger; Lexington, United States; Hard; W60; Singles – Doubles	(Mexico) Renata Zarazúa; 1–6, 7–6^{(7–4)}, 7–5	(United States) Caroline Dolehide	(China) Wang Yafan (Australia) Olivia Gadecki	(United States) Makenna Jones (Australia) Kimberly Birrell (United States) McCartney Kessler (Japan) Himeno Sakatsume
July 31	Lexington Challenger; Lexington, United States; Hard; W60; Singles – Doubles	(United States) Alexis Blokhina (United States) Ava Markham; 6–4, 7–6^{(7–1)}	(Australia) Olivia Gadecki (United States) Dalayna Hewitt	(China) Wang Yafan (Australia) Olivia Gadecki	(United States) Makenna Jones (Australia) Kimberly Birrell (United States) McCartney Kessler (Japan) Himeno Sakatsume
July 31	Women's TEC Cup; Barcelona, Spain; Hard; W60; Singles – Doubles	(Australia) Arina Rodionova; 6–4, 5–7, 6–1	Valeria Savinykh	(Hong Kong) Eudice Chong (Spain) Georgina Garcia-Perez	(United Kingdom) Anna Brogan (Greece) Despina Papamichail (Bulgaria) Isabella Shinikova (Philippines) Alex Eala
July 31	Women's TEC Cup; Barcelona, Spain; Hard; W60; Singles – Doubles	(India) Prarthana Thombare; Anastasia Tikhonova; 3–6, 6–1, [10–7]	(France) Estelle Cascino (Latvia) Diāna Marcinkēviča	(Hong Kong) Eudice Chong (Spain) Georgina Garcia-Perez	(United Kingdom) Anna Brogan (Greece) Despina Papamichail (Bulgaria) Isabella Shinikova (Philippines) Alex Eala
July 31	Junín, Argentina; Clay; W25; Singles and doubles draws	(Argentina) Martina Capurro Taborda; 3–6, 7–6^{(7–2)}, 6–1	(Argentina) Solana Sierra	(Italy) Miriana Tona (United States) Katerina Stewart	(Chile) Fernanda Labraña (Colombia) María Camila Torres Murcia (Mexico) Victoria Rodríguez (Argentina) María Florencia Urrutia
July 31	Junín, Argentina; Clay; W25; Singles and doubles draws	(Peru) Romina Ccuno (Mexico) Victoria Rodríguez; 6–2, 2–6, [10–7]	(Argentina) Julieta Lara Estable (Chile) Fernanda Labraña	(Italy) Miriana Tona (United States) Katerina Stewart	(Chile) Fernanda Labraña (Colombia) María Camila Torres Murcia (Mexico) Victoria Rodríguez (Argentina) María Florencia Urrutia
July 31	President's Cup; Astana, Kazakhstan; Hard; W25; Singles and doubles draws	Polina Iatcenko; 6–3, 6–3	Aliona Falei	Anastasia Zakharova; Polina Leykina	Elena Pridankina (Japan) Haruna Arakawa (Japan) Erika Sema; Ekaterina Maklakova
July 31	President's Cup; Astana, Kazakhstan; Hard; W25; Singles and doubles draws	(Japan) Haruna Arakawa (Japan) Erika Sema; 6–7^{(6–8)}, 6–3, [10–5]	(India) Shrivalli Bhamidipaty (India) Vaidehi Chaudhari	Anastasia Zakharova; Polina Leykina	Elena Pridankina (Japan) Haruna Arakawa (Japan) Erika Sema; Ekaterina Maklakova
July 31	Køge, Denmark; Clay; W25; Singles and doubles draws	(Croatia) Lucija Ćirić Bagarić; 6–3, 7–5	(Belgium) Hanne Vandewinkel	(Greece) Valentini Grammatikopoulou (Ukraine) Anastasiya Soboleva	(Serbia) Dejana Radanović (Czech Republic) Aneta Laboutková (Estonia) Maileen Nuudi (Spain) Carlota Martinez Cirez
July 31	Køge, Denmark; Clay; W25; Singles and doubles draws	(Slovenia) Pia Lovrič (Hungary) Adrienn Nagy; 6–4, 6–0	(France) Tiphanie Lemaître; Anna Zyryanova	(Greece) Valentini Grammatikopoulou (Ukraine) Anastasiya Soboleva	(Serbia) Dejana Radanović (Czech Republic) Aneta Laboutková (Estonia) Maileen Nuudi (Spain) Carlota Martinez Cirez
July 31	Ottershaw, United Kingdom; Hard; W25; Singles and doubles draws	(United Kingdom) Katy Dunne; 6–4, 3–6, 6–4	(Australia) Talia Gibson	(United Kingdom) Sarah Beth Grey (Australia) Destanee Aiava	(Australia) Gabriella Da Silva-Fick (United States) Jenna DeFalco (Austria) Tamira Paszek (Chinese Taipei) Joanna Garland
July 31	Ottershaw, United Kingdom; Hard; W25; Singles and doubles draws	(Australia) Destanee Aiava (India) Rutuja Bhosale; 6–2, 6–3	(Australia) Talia Gibson (Australia) Petra Hule	(United Kingdom) Sarah Beth Grey (Australia) Destanee Aiava	(Australia) Gabriella Da Silva-Fick (United States) Jenna DeFalco (Austria) Tamira Paszek (Chinese Taipei) Joanna Garland
July 31	Tbilisi, Georgia; Hard; W15; Singles and doubles draws	(Cyprus) Daria Frayman; 6–4, 6–3	(Austria) Tamara Kostic	(Poland) Stefania Rogozińska Dzik; Anastasia Sukhotina	(Georgia (country)) Tamari Gagoshidze (United States) Esther Vyrlan (Japan) Nagomi Higashitani (Ukraine) Anastasiia Poplavska
July 31	Tbilisi, Georgia; Hard; W15; Singles and doubles draws	Anastasiia Poplavska (Ukraine) Anastasia Sukhotina; 6–4, 6–2	Iuliia Iudenko; Lidiia Rasskovskaia	(Poland) Stefania Rogozińska Dzik; Anastasia Sukhotina	(Georgia (country)) Tamari Gagoshidze (United States) Esther Vyrlan (Japan) Nagomi Higashitani (Ukraine) Anastasiia Poplavska
July 31	Monastir, Tunisia; Hard; W15; Singles and doubles draws	(France) Caroline Roméo; 6–4, 6–4	(Japan) Hiroko Kuwata	(India) Zeel Desai (Italy) Beatrice Stagno	(Italy) Viola Turini; Ekaterina Shalimova (France) Emmanuelle Girard (Tunisia) Chiraz Bechri
July 31	Monastir, Tunisia; Hard; W15; Singles and doubles draws	(Italy) Matilde Mariani (Poland) Joanna Zawadzka; 6–2, 6–2	Ekaterina Shalimova (Germany) Julia Zhu	(India) Zeel Desai (Italy) Beatrice Stagno	(Italy) Viola Turini; Ekaterina Shalimova (France) Emmanuelle Girard (Tunisia) Chiraz Bechri
July 31	Caloundra, Australia; Hard; W15; Singles and doubles draws	(Turkey) Melisa Ercan; 6–3, 6–0	(Australia) Emerson Jones	(Australia) Kaylah McPhee (Japan) Nanari Katsumi	(Australia) Lara Walker (Australia) Alicia Smith (Japan) Chisa Hosonuma (New Zealand) Elyse Tse
July 31	Caloundra, Australia; Hard; W15; Singles and doubles draws	(New Zealand) Monique Barry (Australia) Lily Fairclough; 6–4, 6–1	(Japan) Yui Chikaraishi (New Zealand) Elyse Tse	(Australia) Kaylah McPhee (Japan) Nanari Katsumi	(Australia) Lara Walker (Australia) Alicia Smith (Japan) Chisa Hosonuma (New Zealand) Elyse Tse
July 31	Eindhoven, Netherlands; Hard; W15; Singles and doubles draws	(Netherlands) Merel Hoedt; 3–6, 6–3, 6–2	(Netherlands) Isis Louise van den Broek	(Netherlands) Lian Tran (United Kingdom) Matilda Mutavdzic	(France) Maëlle Leclercq (Italy) Sofia Rocchetti (Ukraine) Daria Lopatetska (Germany) Angelina Wirges
July 31	Eindhoven, Netherlands; Hard; W15; Singles and doubles draws	(Netherlands) Joy de Zeeuw (Netherlands) Sarah van Emst; 6–1, 4–6, [10–8]	(Netherlands) Rose Marie Nijkamp (Netherlands) Isis Louise van den Broek	(Netherlands) Lian Tran (United Kingdom) Matilda Mutavdzic	(France) Maëlle Leclercq (Italy) Sofia Rocchetti (Ukraine) Daria Lopatetska (Germany) Angelina Wirges
July 31	Sapporo, Japan; Hard; W15; Singles and doubles draws	(Thailand) Thasaporn Naklo; 6–2, 6–3	(Japan) Rinon Okuwaki	(Japan) Kayo Nishimura (Hong Kong) Wu Ho-ching	(Japan) Funa Kozaki (China) Liu Yuhan (South Korea) Jeong Bo-young (Japan) Ayumi Miyamoto
July 31	Sapporo, Japan; Hard; W15; Singles and doubles draws	(Japan) Mao Mushika (Japan) Himari Sato; 6–3, 6–4	(South Korea) Back Da-yeon (South Korea) Jeong Bo-young	(Japan) Kayo Nishimura (Hong Kong) Wu Ho-ching	(Japan) Funa Kozaki (China) Liu Yuhan (South Korea) Jeong Bo-young (Japan) Ayumi Miyamoto
July 31	Savitaipale, Finland; Clay; W15; Singles and doubles draws	(Hungary) Luca Udvardy; 6–0, 6–2	(Romania) Sabina Dadaciu	(Poland) Daria Kuczer (Poland) Olivia Bergler	(Finland) Laura Hietaranta (Poland) Anna Hertel (Sweden) Jacquline Nylander Altelius (Latvia) Margarita Ignatjeva
July 31	Savitaipale, Finland; Clay; W15; Singles and doubles draws	(Finland) Laura Hietaranta (Hungary) Luca Udvardy; 6–1, 6–2	(Poland) Weronika Baszak (Estonia) Anet Angelika Koskel	(Poland) Daria Kuczer (Poland) Olivia Bergler	(Finland) Laura Hietaranta (Poland) Anna Hertel (Sweden) Jacquline Nylander Altelius (Latvia) Margarita Ignatjeva

=== August ===
Week of	Tournament	Winner	Runners-up	Semifinalists	Quarterfinalists
August 7	ITF World Tennis Tour Gran Canaria; Maspalomas, Spain; Clay; W100; Singles – Doubles	(Austria) Julia Grabher; 6–4, 6–4	(Spain) Jéssica Bouzas Maneiro	(Netherlands) Arantxa Rus (Slovenia) Tamara Zidanšek	(Slovenia) Polona Hercog (Netherlands) Suzan Lamens (Italy) Sara Errani; Polina Kudermetova
August 7	ITF World Tennis Tour Gran Canaria; Maspalomas, Spain; Clay; W100; Singles – Doubles	(Hungary) Tímea Babos (Hungary) Anna Bondár; 6–4, 3–6, [10–4]	(Spain) Leyre Romero Gormaz (Netherlands) Arantxa Rus	(Netherlands) Arantxa Rus (Slovenia) Tamara Zidanšek	(Slovenia) Polona Hercog (Netherlands) Suzan Lamens (Italy) Sara Errani; Polina Kudermetova
August 7	Koser Jewelers Tennis Challenge; Landisville, United States; Hard; W100; Singles – Doubles	(China) Wang Xinyu; 6–2, 6–3	(United States) Madison Brengle	(United States) Makenna Jones (South Korea) Jang Su-jeong	Erika Andreeva (United States) Caroline Dolehide (United States) Mary Stoiana (Mexico) Renata Zarazúa
August 7	Koser Jewelers Tennis Challenge; Landisville, United States; Hard; W100; Singles – Doubles	(United States) Sophie Chang (Ukraine) Yulia Starodubtseva; Walkover	(Australia) Olivia Gadecki (Japan) Mai Hontama	(United States) Makenna Jones (South Korea) Jang Su-jeong	Erika Andreeva (United States) Caroline Dolehide (United States) Mary Stoiana (Mexico) Renata Zarazúa
August 7	Engie Open Brasília; Brasília, Brazil; Hard; W80; Singles – Doubles	(Switzerland) Lulu Sun; 6–4, 4–6, 6–2	(France) Léolia Jeanjean	(France) Kristina Mladenovic (Brazil) Laura Pigossi	Jana Kolodynska (Serbia) Natalija Stevanović (Greece) Despina Papamichail (Argentina) Julia Riera
August 7	Engie Open Brasília; Brasília, Brazil; Hard; W80; Singles – Doubles	(Brazil) Carolina Alves (Argentina) Julia Riera; 6–2, 6–3	(United Kingdom) Eden Silva (Ukraine) Valeriya Strakhova	(France) Kristina Mladenovic (Brazil) Laura Pigossi	Jana Kolodynska (Serbia) Natalija Stevanović (Greece) Despina Papamichail (Argentina) Julia Riera
August 7	Kunming Open; Anning, China; Clay; W40; Singles and doubles draw	(China) Gao Xinyu; 6–3, 7–6^{(7–2)}	(China) Wei Sijia	Daria Lodikova (China) Jiang Xinyu	(China) You Xiaodi (Thailand) Lanlana Tararudee (China) Li Zongyu (China) Ren Yufei
August 7	Kunming Open; Anning, China; Clay; W40; Singles and doubles draw	(China) Guo Hanyu (China) Jiang Xinyu; 6–2, 6–0	(Kazakhstan) Zhibek Kulambayeva (Thailand) Lanlana Tararudee	Daria Lodikova (China) Jiang Xinyu	(China) You Xiaodi (Thailand) Lanlana Tararudee (China) Li Zongyu (China) Ren Yufei
August 7	Leipzig, Germany; Clay; W25+H; Singles and doubles draws	(Czech Republic) Brenda Fruhvirtová; 6–3, 6–3	Darya Astakhova	(Ukraine) Anastasiya Soboleva (United States) Vivian Wolff	(Germany) Ella Seidel (Slovenia) Nina Potočnik (Germany) Katharina Hobgarski (France) Tiphanie Lemaître
August 7	Leipzig, Germany; Clay; W25+H; Singles and doubles draws	(France) Estelle Cascino (Australia) Seone Mendez; 6–2, 6–7^{(4–7)}, [10–8]	Julia Avdeeva (Romania) Arina Gabriela Vasilescu	(Ukraine) Anastasiya Soboleva (United States) Vivian Wolff	(Germany) Ella Seidel (Slovenia) Nina Potočnik (Germany) Katharina Hobgarski (France) Tiphanie Lemaître
August 7	Osijek, Croatia; Clay; W25; Singles and doubles draws	(Romania) Anca Todoni; 6–4, 6–3	(North Macedonia) Lina Gjorcheska	(Romania) Ilinca Amariei (Croatia) Tena Lukas	Victoria Kan (Hungary) Amarissa Kiara Tóth (Romania) Ilona Georgiana Ghioroaie (Czech Republic) Dominika Šalková
August 7	Osijek, Croatia; Clay; W25; Singles and doubles draws	(Romania) Ilona Georgiana Ghioroaie (Hungary) Amarissa Kiara Tóth; 6–2, 6–4	(Germany) Luisa Meyer auf der Heide (Greece) Dimitra Pavlou	(Romania) Ilinca Amariei (Croatia) Tena Lukas	Victoria Kan (Hungary) Amarissa Kiara Tóth (Romania) Ilona Georgiana Ghioroaie (Czech Republic) Dominika Šalková
August 7	Koksijde, Belgium; Clay; W25; Singles and doubles draws	(Serbia) Dejana Radanović; 4–6, 7–6^{(7–4)}, 6–2	(Belgium) Hanne Vandewinkel	(Netherlands) Anouk Koevermans (Belgium) Amelie Van Impe	(Bulgaria) Gergana Topalova (Italy) Jessica Pieri (Netherlands) Merel Hoedt; Ekaterina Makarova
August 7	Koksijde, Belgium; Clay; W25; Singles and doubles draws	(Estonia) Maileen Nuudi (Sweden) Kajsa Rinaldo Persson; 6–3, 2–6, [10–5]	(Netherlands) Eva Vedder (Netherlands) Stéphanie Judith Visscher	(Netherlands) Anouk Koevermans (Belgium) Amelie Van Impe	(Bulgaria) Gergana Topalova (Italy) Jessica Pieri (Netherlands) Merel Hoedt; Ekaterina Makarova
August 7	Roehampton, United Kingdom; Hard; W25; Singles and doubles draws	(Philippines) Alex Eala; 6–2, 6–3	(Australia) Arina Rodionova	(Netherlands) Arianne Hartono (United Kingdom) Yuriko Miyazaki	(Australia) Priscilla Hon (Georgia (country)) Mariam Bolkvadze (India) Rutuja Bhosale (Chinese Taipei) Joanna Garland
August 7	Roehampton, United Kingdom; Hard; W25; Singles and doubles draws	(Georgia (country)) Mariam Bolkvadze (United Kingdom) Yuriko Miyazaki; 7–5, 6–3	(Australia) Talia Gibson (Australia) Petra Hule	(Netherlands) Arianne Hartono (United Kingdom) Yuriko Miyazaki	(Australia) Priscilla Hon (Georgia (country)) Mariam Bolkvadze (India) Rutuja Bhosale (Chinese Taipei) Joanna Garland
August 7	Tbilisi, Georgia; Hard; W15; Singles and doubles draws	Alexandra Shubladze; 6–4, 6–3	(Cyprus) Daria Frayman	(Austria) Tamara Kostic; Kristiana Sidorova	(India) Riya Bhatia (India) Tanisha Kashyap (Italy) Lara Pfeifer; Anastasia Sukhotina
August 7	Tbilisi, Georgia; Hard; W15; Singles and doubles draws	Evgeniya Burdina; Kristiana Sidorova; 7–6^{(7–5)}, 7–5	(Ukraine) Anastasiia Poplavska; Anastasia Sukhotina	(Austria) Tamara Kostic; Kristiana Sidorova	(India) Riya Bhatia (India) Tanisha Kashyap (Italy) Lara Pfeifer; Anastasia Sukhotina
August 7	Sapporo, Japan; Hard; W15; Singles and doubles draws	(South Korea) Back Da-yeon; 6–2, 6–0	(Japan) Miho Kuramochi	(Chinese Taipei) Lee Ya-hsuan (Hong Kong) Wu Ho-ching	(Japan) Riko Kikawada (Japan) Himari Sato (Japan) Kayo Nishimura (Japan) Kisa Yoshioka
August 7	Sapporo, Japan; Hard; W15; Singles and doubles draws	(Japan) Nana Kawagishi (Japan) Kisa Yoshioka; 6–3, 6–3	(South Korea) Back Da-yeon (South Korea) Jeong Bo-young	(Chinese Taipei) Lee Ya-hsuan (Hong Kong) Wu Ho-ching	(Japan) Riko Kikawada (Japan) Himari Sato (Japan) Kayo Nishimura (Japan) Kisa Yoshioka
August 7	Oskemen, Kazakhstan; Hard; W15; Singles and doubles draws	(Japan) Ayumi Koshiishi; 6–2, 6–2	(Kazakhstan) Aruzhan Sagandikova	(Kazakhstan) Gozal Ainitdinova (Germany) Sonja Zhiyenbayeva	Arina Arifullina; Valery Gynina (Turkey) Selina Atay; Anastasia Grechkina
August 7	Oskemen, Kazakhstan; Hard; W15; Singles and doubles draws	(Kazakhstan) Asylzhan Arystanbekova (Kazakhstan) Sandugash Kenzhibayeva; 6–4, 6–3	Aglaya Fedorova; Elizaveta Shebekina	(Kazakhstan) Gozal Ainitdinova (Germany) Sonja Zhiyenbayeva	Arina Arifullina; Valery Gynina (Turkey) Selina Atay; Anastasia Grechkina
August 7	Monastir, Tunisia; Hard; W15; Singles and doubles draws	Ekaterina Shalimova; 3–6, 6–4, 6–2	(Egypt) Merna Refaat	(Poland) Joanna Zawadzka (Japan) Hiroko Kuwata	(France) Lucie Brun (United States) Lauren Proctor (Spain) Lucía Llinares Domingo (United States) India Houghton
August 7	Monastir, Tunisia; Hard; W15; Singles and doubles draws	(Italy) Matilde Mariani (Poland) Joanna Zawadzka; 6–3, 2–6, [10–5]	(Italy) Emma Martellenghi (Italy) Beatrice Stagno	(Poland) Joanna Zawadzka (Japan) Hiroko Kuwata	(France) Lucie Brun (United States) Lauren Proctor (Spain) Lucía Llinares Domingo (United States) India Houghton
August 14	Nanchang, China; Clay; W40; Singles and doubles draws	(Thailand) Lanlana Tararudee; 6–2, 6–3	(China) You Xiaodi	(China) Ma Yexin (China) Gao Xinyu	(China) Lu Jiajing (China) Li Zongyu (China) Wei Sijia (China) Ren Yufei
August 14	Nanchang, China; Clay; W40; Singles and doubles draws	(China) Feng Shuo (China) Zheng Wushuang; 5–7, 7–6^{(10–8)}, [10–4]	(Chinese Taipei) Cho I-hsuan (Chinese Taipei) Cho Yi-tsen	(China) Ma Yexin (China) Gao Xinyu	(China) Lu Jiajing (China) Li Zongyu (China) Wei Sijia (China) Ren Yufei
August 14	Arequipa, Peru; Clay; W40; Singles and doubles draws	Jana Kolodynska; 2–6, 6–3, 6–4	(Italy) Miriana Tona	(France) Victoria Muntean (United States) Chloe Beck	(Paraguay) Ana Paula Neffa de los Ríos (Ukraine) Valeriya Strakhova (Argentina) Julieta Lara Estable (Brazil) Ana Candiotto
August 14	Arequipa, Peru; Clay; W40; Singles and doubles draws	(Germany) Natalia Siedliska (Bolivia) Noelia Zeballos; 5–7, 6–2, [10–8]	(Brazil) Ana Candiotto (Peru) Anastasia Iamachkine	(France) Victoria Muntean (United States) Chloe Beck	(Paraguay) Ana Paula Neffa de los Ríos (Ukraine) Valeriya Strakhova (Argentina) Julieta Lara Estable (Brazil) Ana Candiotto
August 14	Wrocław, Poland; Clay; W40; Singles and doubles draws	Darya Astakhova; 6–1, 7–5	(Bulgaria) Gergana Topalova	(Burundi) Sada Nahimana (Slovenia) Dalila Jakupović	(Turkey) Çağla Büyükakçay (Ukraine) Oleksandra Oliynykova (Greece) Sapfo Sakellaridi (Poland) Maja Chwalińska
August 14	Wrocław, Poland; Clay; W40; Singles and doubles draws	(Georgia (country)) Ekaterine Gorgodze (Slovenia) Dalila Jakupović; 6–4, 4–6, [10–7]	(Poland) Weronika Ewald (Poland) Daria Kuczer	(Burundi) Sada Nahimana (Slovenia) Dalila Jakupović	(Turkey) Çağla Büyükakçay (Ukraine) Oleksandra Oliynykova (Greece) Sapfo Sakellaridi (Poland) Maja Chwalińska
August 14	Vrnjačka Banja Open; Vrnjačka Banja, Serbia; Clay; W25; Singles and doubles draws	(Slovenia) Polona Hercog; 6–2, 6–4	(Bulgaria) Isabella Shinikova	(Serbia) Mia Ristić (Italy) Martina Colmegna	(Croatia) Tena Lukas (China) Tian Fangran (Estonia) Elena Malõgina (Romania) Cristina Dinu
August 14	Vrnjačka Banja Open; Vrnjačka Banja, Serbia; Clay; W25; Singles and doubles draws	(Serbia) Elena Milovanović (Australia) Ivana Popovic; 6–4, 6–1	(Italy) Diletta Cherubini (Finland) Laura Hietaranta	(Serbia) Mia Ristić (Italy) Martina Colmegna	(Croatia) Tena Lukas (China) Tian Fangran (Estonia) Elena Malõgina (Romania) Cristina Dinu
August 14	Bistrița, Romania; Clay; W25; Singles and doubles draws	(Romania) Anca Todoni; 7–5, 1–6, 6–2	(Croatia) Lucija Ćirić Bagarić	(Romania) Ilinca Amariei (Romania) Georgia Crăciun	(Belgium) Sofia Costoulas (Romania) Ilona Georgiana Ghioroaie; Evialina Laskevich (Italy) Dalila Spiteri
August 14	Bistrița, Romania; Clay; W25; Singles and doubles draws	(Romania) Ilona Georgiana Ghioroaie (Romania) Oana Georgeta Simion; 7–6^{(8–6)}, 6–2	(Czech Republic) Linda Ševčíková (Turkey) İlay Yörük	(Romania) Ilinca Amariei (Romania) Georgia Crăciun	(Belgium) Sofia Costoulas (Romania) Ilona Georgiana Ghioroaie; Evialina Laskevich (Italy) Dalila Spiteri
August 14	Ourense, Spain; Hard; W25; Singles and doubles draws	(Netherlands) Lesley Pattinama Kerkhove; 7–6^{(7–1)}, 6–4	(Portugal) Francisca Jorge	(Spain) Lucía Cortez Llorca (Spain) Georgina García Pérez	(Romania) Karola Bejenaru; Ekaterina Reyngold (Denmark) Olga Helmi; Alina Charaeva
August 14	Ourense, Spain; Hard; W25; Singles and doubles draws	(Spain) Lucía Cortez Llorca (Spain) Guiomar Maristany; 6–4, 3–6, [10–6]	(Romania) Karola Bejenaru (France) Yasmine Mansouri	(Spain) Lucía Cortez Llorca (Spain) Georgina García Pérez	(Romania) Karola Bejenaru; Ekaterina Reyngold (Denmark) Olga Helmi; Alina Charaeva
August 14	Erwitte, Germany; Clay; W25; Singles and doubles draws	(Czech Republic) Nikola Bartůňková; 6–4, 6–1	(Latvia) Daniela Vismane	(Netherlands) Suzan Lamens (Ukraine) Anastasiya Soboleva	(Liechtenstein) Kathinka von Deichmann (Estonia) Maileen Nuudi (Germany) Julia Middendorf (Slovakia) Nina Vargová
August 14	Erwitte, Germany; Clay; W25; Singles and doubles draws	(Slovenia) Nika Radišić (Bosnia and Herzegovina) Anita Wagner; 7–5, 7–6^{(7–4)}	Ekaterina Ovcharenko (Hungary) Amarissa Kiara Tóth	(Netherlands) Suzan Lamens (Ukraine) Anastasiya Soboleva	(Liechtenstein) Kathinka von Deichmann (Estonia) Maileen Nuudi (Germany) Julia Middendorf (Slovakia) Nina Vargová
August 14	Aldershot, United Kingdom; Hard; W25; Singles and doubles draws	(Australia) Destanee Aiava; 3–6, 6–4, 6–1	(Philippines) Alex Eala	(Georgia (country)) Mariam Bolkvadze (United Kingdom) Katy Dunne	(United Kingdom) Amarni Banks (Chinese Taipei) Joanna Garland (United States) Jenna DeFalco (Latvia) Diāna Marcinkēviča
August 14	Aldershot, United Kingdom; Hard; W25; Singles and doubles draws	(Australia) Destanee Aiava (United Kingdom) Sarah Beth Grey; 6–4, 6–3	(Japan) Erina Hayashi (Japan) Saki Imamura	(Georgia (country)) Mariam Bolkvadze (United Kingdom) Katy Dunne	(United Kingdom) Amarni Banks (Chinese Taipei) Joanna Garland (United States) Jenna DeFalco (Latvia) Diāna Marcinkēviča
August 14	Duffel, Belgium; Clay; W15; Singles and doubles draws	(Belgium) Amelie Van Impe; 6–2, 6–3	(Belgium) Vicky Van de Peer	(Germany) Fabienne Gettwart (France) Laïa Petretic	(Netherlands) Stéphanie Judith Visscher (Ukraine) Veronika Podrez (Netherlands) Lian Tran (Japan) Chihiro Muramatsu
August 14	Duffel, Belgium; Clay; W15; Singles and doubles draws	Polina Bakhmutkina (Belgium) Chelsea Vanhoutte; 7–5, 6–4	(United States) Kolie Allen (Belgium) Ema Kovacevic	(Germany) Fabienne Gettwart (France) Laïa Petretic	(Netherlands) Stéphanie Judith Visscher (Ukraine) Veronika Podrez (Netherlands) Lian Tran (Japan) Chihiro Muramatsu
August 14	Oskemen, Kazakhstan; Hard; W15; Singles and doubles draws	Kristina Sidorova; 6–4, 6–2	Aglaya Fedorova	(Kazakhstan) Aruzhan Sagandikova; Anastasia Sukhotina	Maria Kalyakina; Anna Sedysheva (Turkey) Defne Çırpanlı (Kazakhstan) Asylzhan Arystanbekova
August 14	Oskemen, Kazakhstan; Hard; W15; Singles and doubles draws	Aglaya Fedorova; Kristiana Sidorova; 7–6^{(7–4)}, 7–6^{(7–5)}	(Kyrgyzstan) Vladislava Andreevskaya (Kazakhstan) Dana Baidaulet	(Kazakhstan) Aruzhan Sagandikova; Anastasia Sukhotina	Maria Kalyakina; Anna Sedysheva (Turkey) Defne Çırpanlı (Kazakhstan) Asylzhan Arystanbekova
August 14	Monastir, Tunisia; Hard; W15; Singles and doubles draws	Anastasiia Gureva; 6–2, 3–6, 6–1	(United States) Victoria Flores	(Egypt) Lamis Alhussein Abdel Aziz (United States) Lauren Proctor	(Italy) Lara Pfeifer (France) Marie Villet (Japan) Hiroko Kuwata; Ekaterina Shalimova
August 14	Monastir, Tunisia; Hard; W15; Singles and doubles draws	Ekaterina Shalimova (Slovakia) Radka Zelníčková; 6–7^{(4–7)}, 6–1, [10–8]	Anastasiia Gureva (Italy) Beatrice Stagno	(Egypt) Lamis Alhussein Abdel Aziz (United States) Lauren Proctor	(Italy) Lara Pfeifer (France) Marie Villet (Japan) Hiroko Kuwata; Ekaterina Shalimova
August 21	Zubr Cup; Přerov, Czech Republic; Clay; W60; Singles – Doubles	(Serbia) Mia Ristić; 6–1, 6–2	(Italy) Aurora Zantedeschi	(Romania) Andreea Mitu (Georgia (country)) Sofia Shapatava	(Croatia) Antonia Ružić (Czech Republic) Dominika Šalková; Darya Astakhova (Italy) Camilla Rosatello
August 21	Zubr Cup; Přerov, Czech Republic; Clay; W60; Singles – Doubles	(Greece) Sapfo Sakellaridi (Czech Republic) Anna Sisková; 6–2, 6–3	(Italy) Angelica Moratelli (Italy) Camilla Rosatello	(Romania) Andreea Mitu (Georgia (country)) Sofia Shapatava	(Croatia) Antonia Ružić (Czech Republic) Dominika Šalková; Darya Astakhova (Italy) Camilla Rosatello
August 21	Hong Kong, Hong Kong; Hard; W40; Singles and doubles draws	(Chinese Taipei) Yang Ya-yi; 6–3, 4–6, 6–3	(Thailand) Mananchaya Sawangkaew	(Japan) Kyōka Okamura (Hong Kong) Adithya Karunaratne	(Hong Kong) Eudice Chong; Anastasia Zakharova (Japan) Sara Saito (Chinese Taipei) Liang En-shuo
August 21	Hong Kong, Hong Kong; Hard; W40; Singles and doubles draws	(Japan) Momoko Kobori (Japan) Ayano Shimizu; 3–6, 6–3, [11–9]	(Japan) Aoi Ito (Japan) Erika Sema	(Japan) Kyōka Okamura (Hong Kong) Adithya Karunaratne	(Hong Kong) Eudice Chong; Anastasia Zakharova (Japan) Sara Saito (Chinese Taipei) Liang En-shuo
August 21	Braunschweig, Germany; Clay; W25; Singles and doubles draws	(Germany) Ella Seidel; 7–6^{(7–4)}, 6–3	(Germany) Julia Middendorf	Polina Kudermetova; Ekaterina Ovcharenko	(Belgium) Amelie Van Impe (Georgia (country)) Ekaterine Gorgodze (Belgium) Hanne Vandewinkel; Alevtina Ibragimova
August 21	Braunschweig, Germany; Clay; W25; Singles and doubles draws	(Germany) Tea Lukic (Germany) Joëlle Steur; 6–4, 7–5	(Belgium) Amelie Van Impe (Belgium) Hanne Vandewinkel	Polina Kudermetova; Ekaterina Ovcharenko	(Belgium) Amelie Van Impe (Georgia (country)) Ekaterine Gorgodze (Belgium) Hanne Vandewinkel; Alevtina Ibragimova
August 21	Bydgoszcz, Poland; Hard; W25; Singles and doubles draws	(Slovenia) Dalila Jakupović; 6–2, 6–1	(Slovenia) Nika Radišić	(Australia) Seone Mendez (Poland) Weronika Falkowska	(Ukraine) Anastasiya Soboleva (Slovakia) Katarína Kužmová (Italy) Martina Spigarelli; Valeriia Olianovskaia
August 21	Bydgoszcz, Poland; Hard; W25; Singles and doubles draws	(Slovenia) Dalila Jakupović (Slovenia) Nika Radišić; 6–4, 6–2	(Poland) Zuzanna Pawlikowska (Poland) Malwina Rowińska	(Australia) Seone Mendez (Poland) Weronika Falkowska	(Ukraine) Anastasiya Soboleva (Slovakia) Katarína Kužmová (Italy) Martina Spigarelli; Valeriia Olianovskaia
August 21	Vigo, Spain; Hard; W25; Singles and doubles draws	(Croatia) Jana Fett; 6–7^{(5–7)}, 6–3, 6–1	(Netherlands) Lesley Pattinama Kerkhove	(United Kingdom) Anna Brogan (Spain) Charo Esquiva Bañuls	(Canada) Marina Stakusic (Switzerland) Susan Bandecchi (Portugal) Francisca Jorge (Spain) Eva Guerrero Álvarez
August 21	Vigo, Spain; Hard; W25; Singles and doubles draws	(Bosnia and Herzegovina) Nefisa Berberović (United Kingdom) Sarah Beth Grey; 6–3, 4–6, [11–9]	(Italy) Anastasia Abbagnato (Lithuania) Patricija Paukštytė	(United Kingdom) Anna Brogan (Spain) Charo Esquiva Bañuls	(Canada) Marina Stakusic (Switzerland) Susan Bandecchi (Portugal) Francisca Jorge (Spain) Eva Guerrero Álvarez
August 21	Malmö, Sweden; Clay; W25; Singles and doubles draws	(Netherlands) Suzan Lamens; 6–1, 6–4	(Turkey) Ayla Aksu	(Ukraine) Oleksandra Oliynykova (Sweden) Jacqueline Cabaj Awad	(Norway) Malene Helgø (Denmark) Sarafina Olivia Hansen (Greece) Martha Matoula (Estonia) Elena Malõgina
August 21	Malmö, Sweden; Clay; W25; Singles and doubles draws	(Netherlands) Suzan Lamens (Netherlands) Lexie Stevens; 6–4, 6–1	(Sweden) Jacqueline Cabaj Awad (Sweden) Lisa Zaar	(Ukraine) Oleksandra Oliynykova (Sweden) Jacqueline Cabaj Awad	(Norway) Malene Helgø (Denmark) Sarafina Olivia Hansen (Greece) Martha Matoula (Estonia) Elena Malõgina
August 21	Verbier, Switzerland; Clay; W25; Singles and doubles draws	(Latvia) Diāna Marcinkēviča; 6–3, 6–4	(Switzerland) Conny Perrin	(Switzerland) Leonie Küng (Australia) Tina Nadine Smith	(Italy) Federica Di Sarra (Liechtenstein) Kathinka von Deichmann (Switzerland) Valentina Ryser (Switzerland) Sandy Marti
August 21	Verbier, Switzerland; Clay; W25; Singles and doubles draws	(Italy) Deborah Chiesa (Italy) Dalila Spiteri; 1–6, 6–3, [10–7]	(Algeria) Inès Ibbou (Switzerland) Naïma Karamoko	(Switzerland) Leonie Küng (Australia) Tina Nadine Smith	(Italy) Federica Di Sarra (Liechtenstein) Kathinka von Deichmann (Switzerland) Valentina Ryser (Switzerland) Sandy Marti
August 21	Baku, Azerbaijan; Hard; W15; Singles and doubles draws	(France) Yaroslava Bartashevich; 7–5, 6–4	Polina Leykina	(Netherlands) Michelle Dzjachangirova; Anna Semenova	(Slovakia) Ingrid Vojčináková (Serbia) Darja Suvirđonkova; Iuliia Iudenko (Romania) Maria Toma
August 21	Baku, Azerbaijan; Hard; W15; Singles and doubles draws	(Kazakhstan) Mariya Sinitsyna (Kyrgyzstan) Arina Solomatina; 6–1, 7–6^{(7–5)}	Nadezda Khalturina; Polina Leykina	(Netherlands) Michelle Dzjachangirova; Anna Semenova	(Slovakia) Ingrid Vojčináková (Serbia) Darja Suvirđonkova; Iuliia Iudenko (Romania) Maria Toma
August 21	Wanfercée-Baulet, Belgium; Clay; W15; Singles and doubles draws	(Ukraine) Veronika Podrez; 4–6, 6–4, 6–4	(Netherlands) Stéphanie Judith Visscher	(Germany) Fabienne Gettwart (Belgium) Jeline Vandromme	(France) Nina Radovanovic (Germany) Selina Dal (Netherlands) Lian Tran (Germany) Johanna Silva
August 21	Wanfercée-Baulet, Belgium; Clay; W15; Singles and doubles draws	(Germany) Selina Dal (Netherlands) Stéphanie Judith Visscher; 6–1, 6–2	(Italy) Enola Chiesa (Italy) Samira De Stefano	(Germany) Fabienne Gettwart (Belgium) Jeline Vandromme	(France) Nina Radovanovic (Germany) Selina Dal (Netherlands) Lian Tran (Germany) Johanna Silva
August 21	Lima, Peru; Clay; W15; Singles and doubles draws	(Liechtenstein) Sylvie Zünd; 3–6, 6–3, 6–0	(Argentina) Julieta Lara Estable	(United States) Amy Zhu (United States) Sabastiani León	(Mexico) Ana Sofía Sánchez (Argentina) Lourdes Ayala (Brazil) Leticia Garcia Vidal (Argentina) Chiara Di Genova
August 21	Lima, Peru; Clay; W15; Singles and doubles draws	(Peru) Romina Ccuno (Chile) Fernanda Labraña; 6–4, 6–4	(Argentina) Lourdes Ayala (Argentina) Julieta Lara Estable	(United States) Amy Zhu (United States) Sabastiani León	(Mexico) Ana Sofía Sánchez (Argentina) Lourdes Ayala (Brazil) Leticia Garcia Vidal (Argentina) Chiara Di Genova
August 21	Brașov, Romania; Clay; W15; Singles and doubles draws	(Romania) Maria Sara Popa; 5–7, 6–2, 7–5	(Romania) Selma Ștefania Cadar	(Serbia) Jana Bojović (Romania) Anastasia Safta	(Romania) Ștefania Bojică (Italy) Denise Valente (Turkey) Doğa Türkmen (France) Laïa Petretic
August 21	Brașov, Romania; Clay; W15; Singles and doubles draws	(Italy) Nicole Fossa Huergo (Serbia) Bojana Marinković; 6–2, 6–4	(Romania) Bianca Elena Bărbulescu (Czech Republic) Linda Ševčíková	(Serbia) Jana Bojović (Romania) Anastasia Safta	(Romania) Ștefania Bojică (Italy) Denise Valente (Turkey) Doğa Türkmen (France) Laïa Petretic
August 21	Nakhon Si Thammarat, Thailand; Hard; W15; Singles and doubles draws	(Thailand) Patcharin Cheapchandej; 6–3, 6–2	(Japan) Miho Kuramochi	(Thailand) Anchisa Chanta (Japan) Mayuka Aikawa	(Thailand) Punnin Kovapitukted (China) Chen Mengyi (Japan) Lisa Marie Rioux (China) Yang Yidi
August 21	Nakhon Si Thammarat, Thailand; Hard; W15; Singles and doubles draws	(Thailand) Anchisa Chanta (Thailand) Salakthip Ounmuang; 7–6^{(8–6)}, 6–2	(Kazakhstan) Gozal Ainitdinova (China) Yang Yidi	(Thailand) Anchisa Chanta (Japan) Mayuka Aikawa	(Thailand) Punnin Kovapitukted (China) Chen Mengyi (Japan) Lisa Marie Rioux (China) Yang Yidi
August 21	Monastir, Tunisia; Hard; W15; Singles and doubles draws	(Egypt) Lamis Alhussein Abdel Aziz; 7–6^{(7–2)}, 0–6, 6–3	(France) Marie Villet	Anastasiia Gureva (France) Marine Szostak	(Slovakia) Radka Zelníčková (Italy) Anastasia Piangerelli; Ekaterina Shalimova (Egypt) Sandra Samir
August 21	Monastir, Tunisia; Hard; W15; Singles and doubles draws	Anastasiia Gureva (Slovakia) Radka Zelníčková; 6–3, 5–7, [11–9]	(Switzerland) Kristina Milenkovic (Egypt) Sandra Samir	Anastasiia Gureva (France) Marine Szostak	(Slovakia) Radka Zelníčková (Italy) Anastasia Piangerelli; Ekaterina Shalimova (Egypt) Sandra Samir
August 28	Kuchyně Gorenje Prague Open; Prague, Czech Republic; Clay; W60; Singles – Doubles	(Romania) Andreea Mitu; 7–6^{(7–1)}, 2–6, 6–3	(Czech Republic) Sára Bejlek	(Australia) Seone Mendez (Italy) Camilla Rosatello	(Germany) Katharina Hobgarski (Romania) Irina Bara (Ukraine) Anastasiya Soboleva (Romania) Anca Todoni
August 28	Kuchyně Gorenje Prague Open; Prague, Czech Republic; Clay; W60; Singles – Doubles	(Poland) Martyna Kubka (Kazakhstan) Zhibek Kulambayeva; 7–6^{(7–3)}, 6–4	(Italy) Angelica Moratelli (Italy) Camilla Rosatello	(Australia) Seone Mendez (Italy) Camilla Rosatello	(Germany) Katharina Hobgarski (Romania) Irina Bara (Ukraine) Anastasiya Soboleva (Romania) Anca Todoni
August 28	TCCB Open; Collonge-Bellerive, Switzerland; Clay; W60; Singles – Doubles	(France) Chloé Paquet; 6–2, 6–1	(Italy) Lucrezia Stefanini	(Switzerland) Conny Perrin (Turkey) İpek Öz	(France) Loïs Boisson; Ekaterina Maklakova; Polina Kudermetova (Australia) Tina Nadine Smith
August 28	TCCB Open; Collonge-Bellerive, Switzerland; Clay; W60; Singles – Doubles	(Switzerland) Conny Perrin (Czech Republic) Anna Sisková; 7–6^{(7–4)}, 6–1	(France) Estelle Cascino (Latvia) Diāna Marcinkēviča	(Switzerland) Conny Perrin (Turkey) İpek Öz	(France) Loïs Boisson; Ekaterina Maklakova; Polina Kudermetova (Australia) Tina Nadine Smith
August 28	Oldenzaal, Netherlands; Clay; W40; Singles and doubles draws	(Czech Republic) Brenda Fruhvirtová; 7–5, 6–2	(Netherlands) Anouk Koevermans	(Germany) Fabienne Gettwart (Netherlands) Eva Vedder	(Netherlands) Suzan Lamens (Netherlands) Isis Louise van den Broek (Uzbekistan) Nigina Abduraimova (United States) Vivian Wolff
August 28	Oldenzaal, Netherlands; Clay; W40; Singles and doubles draws	(Bulgaria) Gergana Topalova (Latvia) Daniela Vismane; 7–5, 2–6, [10–5]	(Netherlands) Isabelle Haverlag (Netherlands) Eva Vedder	(Germany) Fabienne Gettwart (Netherlands) Eva Vedder	(Netherlands) Suzan Lamens (Netherlands) Isis Louise van den Broek (Uzbekistan) Nigina Abduraimova (United States) Vivian Wolff
August 28	Trieste, Italy; Clay; W25; Singles and doubles draws	(Italy) Sofia Rocchetti; 7–6^{(7–5)}, 6–1	(Croatia) Iva Primorac	(Slovenia) Nika Radišić (Finland) Laura Hietaranta	(Spain) Ángela Fita Boluda (Italy) Jennifer Ruggeri; Victoria Kan (Italy) Anastasia Abbagnato
August 28	Trieste, Italy; Clay; W25; Singles and doubles draws	(Slovenia) Nika Radišić (Bosnia and Herzegovina) Anita Wagner; 6–1, 6–1	(Croatia) Mariana Dražić; Anastasia Gasanova	(Slovenia) Nika Radišić (Finland) Laura Hietaranta	(Spain) Ángela Fita Boluda (Italy) Jennifer Ruggeri; Victoria Kan (Italy) Anastasia Abbagnato
August 28	Valladolid, Spain; Hard; W25; Singles and doubles draws	(Canada) Marina Stakusic; 3–6, 7–5, 6–3	Anna Kubareva	(Denmark) Olga Helmi (China) Tian Fangran	(Spain) Georgina García Pérez (Australia) Alexandra Bozovic (United Kingdom) Amarni Banks (Spain) María García Cid
August 28	Valladolid, Spain; Hard; W25; Singles and doubles draws	(Australia) Alexandra Bozovic (United Kingdom) Sarah Beth Grey; 7–5, 6–0	(United States) Ava Markham (China) Tian Fangran	(Denmark) Olga Helmi (China) Tian Fangran	(Spain) Georgina García Pérez (Australia) Alexandra Bozovic (United Kingdom) Amarni Banks (Spain) María García Cid
August 28	Nakhon Si Thammarat, Thailand; Hard; W25; Singles and doubles draws	Anastasia Zakharova; 6–2, 6–4	Aliona Falei	Daria Lodikova; Daria Kudashova	(Thailand) Luksika Kumkhum (Thailand) Mananchaya Sawangkaew (Thailand) Salakthip Ounmuang (Hong Kong) Cody Wong
August 28	Nakhon Si Thammarat, Thailand; Hard; W25; Singles and doubles draws	(Thailand) Luksika Kumkhum (South Korea) Park So-hyun; 7–6^{(7–4)}, 6–0	(India) Vaidehi Chaudhari (India) Zeel Desai	Daria Lodikova; Daria Kudashova	(Thailand) Luksika Kumkhum (Thailand) Mananchaya Sawangkaew (Thailand) Salakthip Ounmuang (Hong Kong) Cody Wong
August 28	Baku, Azerbaijan; Hard; W15; Singles and doubles draws	(France) Yaroslava Bartashevich; 7–6^{(7–2)}, 6–4	(Netherlands) Anouck Vrancken Peeters	(Romania) Maria Toma; Evgeniya Burdina	Polina Leykina; Nadezda Khalturina (United Kingdom) Danielle Daley (Austria) Arabella Koller
August 28	Baku, Azerbaijan; Hard; W15; Singles and doubles draws	(Turkey) Selina Atay; Maria Mikhailova; 2–6, 6–2, [10–7]	(India) Sravya Shivani Chilakalapudi (India) Snehal Mane	(Romania) Maria Toma; Evgeniya Burdina	Polina Leykina; Nadezda Khalturina (United Kingdom) Danielle Daley (Austria) Arabella Koller
August 28	Brașov, Romania; Clay; W15; Singles and doubles draws	(Ukraine) Alisa Baranovska; 6–3, 6–3	(Italy) Nicole Fossa Huergo	(Serbia) Jana Bojović (Bulgaria) Julia Stamatova	(Romania) Selma Ștefania Cadar (Italy) Giulia Carbonaro (Romania) Bianca Bulat (Romania) Ștefania Bojică
August 28	Brașov, Romania; Clay; W15; Singles and doubles draws	(Romania) Simona Ogescu (Czech Republic) Linda Ševčíková; 7–6^{(10–8)}, 7–5	(Italy) Nicole Fossa Huergo (Bulgaria) Julia Stamatova	(Serbia) Jana Bojović (Bulgaria) Julia Stamatova	(Romania) Selma Ștefania Cadar (Italy) Giulia Carbonaro (Romania) Bianca Bulat (Romania) Ștefania Bojică
August 28	Kuršumlijska Banja, Serbia; Clay; W15; Singles and doubles draws	(Serbia) Natalija Senić; 6–2, 4–6, 6–2	(Serbia) Anja Stanković	(Bosnia and Herzegovina) Suana Tucaković (Sweden) Maja Radenkovic	(Bulgaria) Gebriela Mihaylova (Slovenia) Manca Pislak (Serbia) Fatma Idrizović (Netherlands) Madelief Hageman
August 28	Kuršumlijska Banja, Serbia; Clay; W15; Singles and doubles draws	(Serbia) Natalija Senić (Serbia) Anja Stanković; 6–2, 6–2	(Bulgaria) Gebriela Mihaylova (Bulgaria) Yoana Radulova	(Bosnia and Herzegovina) Suana Tucaković (Sweden) Maja Radenkovic	(Bulgaria) Gebriela Mihaylova (Slovenia) Manca Pislak (Serbia) Fatma Idrizović (Netherlands) Madelief Hageman
August 28	Yeongwol, South Korea; Hard; W15; Singles and doubles draws	(South Korea) Back Da-yeon; 6–3, 6–0	(United States) Dasha Ivanova	(South Korea) Jeong Bo-young (Japan) Hikaru Sato	(South Korea) Kim Cherry (Hong Kong) Wu Ho-ching (South Korea) Lee Eun-hye (South Korea) Ahn Yu-jin
August 28	Yeongwol, South Korea; Hard; W15; Singles and doubles draws	(South Korea) Kim Da-bin (South Korea) Kim Na-ri; 6–2, 7–5	(South Korea) Kim Da-hye (Netherlands) Demi Tran	(South Korea) Jeong Bo-young (Japan) Hikaru Sato	(South Korea) Kim Cherry (Hong Kong) Wu Ho-ching (South Korea) Lee Eun-hye (South Korea) Ahn Yu-jin
August 28	Monastir, Tunisia; Hard; W15; Singles and doubles draws	(Cyprus) Daria Frayman; 7–5, 6–1	(Italy) Lara Pfeifer	(Egypt) Merna Refaat (Egypt) Lamis Alhussein Abdel Aziz	(Egypt) Sandra Samir (Italy) Anastasia Piangerelli (France) Alyssa Réguer (Switzerland) Kristina Milenkovic
August 28	Monastir, Tunisia; Hard; W15; Singles and doubles draws	(Germany) Luisa Hrda (Germany) Yasmine Wagner; 7–5, 6–1	(Romania) Alexandra Iordache (Italy) Maria Vittoria Viviani	(Egypt) Merna Refaat (Egypt) Lamis Alhussein Abdel Aziz	(Egypt) Sandra Samir (Italy) Anastasia Piangerelli (France) Alyssa Réguer (Switzerland) Kristina Milenkovic

=== September ===
Week of	Tournament	Winner	Runners-up	Semifinalists	Quarterfinalists
September 4	Ando Securities Open; Tokyo, Japan; Hard; W100; Singles – Doubles	(Switzerland) Viktorija Golubic; 6–4, 3–6, 6–4	(China) Wang Xiyu	(Ukraine) Kateryna Volodko (Australia) Kimberly Birrell	(China) You Xiaodi (Netherlands) Arianne Hartono (Japan) Yuki Naito (Germany) Jule Niemeier
September 4	Ando Securities Open; Tokyo, Japan; Hard; W100; Singles – Doubles	(France) Jessika Ponchet (Netherlands) Bibiane Schoofs; 4–6, 6–1, [10–7]	(United Kingdom) Alicia Barnett (United Kingdom) Olivia Nicholls	(Ukraine) Kateryna Volodko (Australia) Kimberly Birrell	(China) You Xiaodi (Netherlands) Arianne Hartono (Japan) Yuki Naito (Germany) Jule Niemeier
September 4	Elle Spirit Open; Montreux, Switzerland; Clay; W60; Singles – Doubles	(Hungary) Anna Bondár; 6–4, 6–1	(Germany) Anna Gabric	(Czech Republic) Lucie Havlíčková (France) Oceane Dodin	(Italy) Lucrezia Stefanini (Switzerland) Conny Perrin (Burundi) Sada Nahimana (Switzerland) Fiona Ganz
September 4	Elle Spirit Open; Montreux, Switzerland; Clay; W60; Singles – Doubles	Amina Anshba (Netherlands) Lexie Stevens; 1–6, 7–5, [12–10]	(Portugal) Francisca Jorge (Portugal) Matilde Jorge	(Czech Republic) Lucie Havlíčková (France) Oceane Dodin	(Italy) Lucrezia Stefanini (Switzerland) Conny Perrin (Burundi) Sada Nahimana (Switzerland) Fiona Ganz
September 4	Ladies Open Vienna; Vienna, Austria; Clay; W60; Singles – Doubles	(Croatia) Tena Lukas; 7–5, 6–1	(Romania) Miriam Bulgaru	(Slovenia) Polona Hercog (Romania) Irina Bara	(Romania) Cristina Dinu (Uzbekistan) Nigina Abduraimova (North Macedonia) Lina Gjorcheska (Austria) Sinja Kraus
September 4	Ladies Open Vienna; Vienna, Austria; Clay; W60; Singles – Doubles	(Romania) Irina Bara (Poland) Weronika Falkowska; 6–3, 2–6, [13–11]	(Austria) Melanie Klaffner (Austria) Sinja Kraus	(Slovenia) Polona Hercog (Romania) Irina Bara	(Romania) Cristina Dinu (Uzbekistan) Nigina Abduraimova (North Macedonia) Lina Gjorcheska (Austria) Sinja Kraus
September 4	Saint-Palais-sur-Mer, France; Clay; W40; Singles and doubles draws	(Bulgaria) Gergana Topalova; 7–5, 5–7, 6–1	(Lithuania) Justina Mikulskytė	(France) Amandine Hesse; Ksenia Zaytseva	(United States) Maria Mateas (France) Diana Martynov (Australia) Kaylah McPhee (Spain) Irene Burillo Escorihuela
September 4	Saint-Palais-sur-Mer, France; Clay; W40; Singles and doubles draws	(Ukraine) Valeriya Strakhova (United Kingdom) Emily Appleton; 6–1, 6–2	(France) Victoria Muntean (India) Vasanti Shinde	(France) Amandine Hesse; Ksenia Zaytseva	(United States) Maria Mateas (France) Diana Martynov (Australia) Kaylah McPhee (Spain) Irene Burillo Escorihuela
September 4	Frýdek-Místek, Czech Republic; Clay; W25; Singles and doubles draws	(Italy) Silvia Ambrosio; 6–0, 6–2	(Czech Republic) Julie Štruplová	(Bulgaria) Isabella Shinikova (Czech Republic) Aneta Kučmová	(Poland) Maja Chwalińska (Sweden) Lisa Zaar (Sweden) Kajsa Rinaldo Persson (Czech Republic) Linda Klimovičová
September 4	Frýdek-Místek, Czech Republic; Clay; W25; Singles and doubles draws	(Japan) Mana Kawamura (Czech Republic) Linda Klimovičová; 6–1, 6–3	(Ukraine) Maryna Kolb (Ukraine) Nadiya Kolb	(Bulgaria) Isabella Shinikova (Czech Republic) Aneta Kučmová	(Poland) Maja Chwalińska (Sweden) Lisa Zaar (Sweden) Kajsa Rinaldo Persson (Czech Republic) Linda Klimovičová
September 4	Zaragoza, Spain; Clay; W25; Singles and doubles draws	(Argentina) Solana Sierra; 4–6, 6–2, 6–2	(Argentina) Guillermina Naya	(United States) Ashley Lahey (Italy) Arianna Zucchini	(Italy) Diletta Cherubini (Spain) Ángela Fita Boluda (Italy) Martina Colmegna (France) Yasmine Mansouri
September 4	Zaragoza, Spain; Clay; W25; Singles and doubles draws	(Italy) Martina Colmegna (Argentina) Solana Sierra; 4–6, 6–4, [10–8]	(United States) Kimmi Hance (United States) Ashley Lahey	(United States) Ashley Lahey (Italy) Arianna Zucchini	(Italy) Diletta Cherubini (Spain) Ángela Fita Boluda (Italy) Martina Colmegna (France) Yasmine Mansouri
September 4	Nakhon Si Thammarat, Thailand; Hard; W25; Singles and doubles draws	Anastasia Zakharova; 6–3, 6–3	Anastasia Kovaleva	(Thailand) Mananchaya Sawangkaew (China) Ma Yexin	Daria Lodikova; Aliona Falei (China) Liu Fangzhou (Japan) Misaki Matsuda
September 4	Nakhon Si Thammarat, Thailand; Hard; W25; Singles and doubles draws	(Thailand) Punnin Kovapitukted (China) Tang Qianhui; 7–6^{(7–2)}, 1–6, [10–3]	(Japan) Misaki Matsuda (Japan) Naho Sato	(Thailand) Mananchaya Sawangkaew (China) Ma Yexin	Daria Lodikova; Aliona Falei (China) Liu Fangzhou (Japan) Misaki Matsuda
September 4	Shenzhen, China; Hard; W15; Singles and doubles draws	(China) Zheng Wushuang; 6–3, 6–3	(China) Li Jiayou	(China) Dong Na (China) Yuan Chengyiyi	(China) Guo Meiqi (China) Chen Mengyi (China) Xun Fangying (China) Sun Yingqun
September 4	Shenzhen, China; Hard; W15; Singles and doubles draws	(China) Xun Fangying (China) Zheng Wushuang; 7–5, 6–4	(Chinese Taipei) Lin Fang-an (China) Yuan Chengyiyi	(China) Dong Na (China) Yuan Chengyiyi	(China) Guo Meiqi (China) Chen Mengyi (China) Xun Fangying (China) Sun Yingqun
September 4	Fiano Romano, Italy; Clay; W15; Singles and doubles draws	Alexandra Shubladze; 6–7^{(5–7)}, 6–2, 6–1	(Italy) Enola Chiesa	(Italy) Denise Valente (Italy) Eleonora Alvisi	(Italy) Anastasia Abbagnato (Italy) Lavinia Morreale (Italy) Giulia Carbonaro (Switzerland) Lara Michel
September 4	Fiano Romano, Italy; Clay; W15; Singles and doubles draws	(Italy) Enola Chiesa (Italy) Samira De Stefano; 6–1, 6–4	(Switzerland) Lara Michel (Italy) Gaia Sanesi	(Italy) Denise Valente (Italy) Eleonora Alvisi	(Italy) Anastasia Abbagnato (Italy) Lavinia Morreale (Italy) Giulia Carbonaro (Switzerland) Lara Michel
September 4	Haren, Netherlands; Clay; W15; Singles and doubles draws	(Netherlands) Isis Louise van den Broek; 7–6^{(7–5)}, 6–0	(Germany) Eva Marie Voracek	(Germany) Josy Daems (Germany) Marie Vogt	(Germany) Sina Herrmann (Netherlands) Britt du Pree (Belgium) Chelsea Vanhoutte (Germany) Katharina Hering
September 4	Haren, Netherlands; Clay; W15; Singles and doubles draws	(Netherlands) Rikke de Koning (Netherlands) Marente Sijbesma; 6–3, 6–2	(Switzerland) Nicole Gadient (Germany) Eva Marie Voracek	(Germany) Josy Daems (Germany) Marie Vogt	(Germany) Sina Herrmann (Netherlands) Britt du Pree (Belgium) Chelsea Vanhoutte (Germany) Katharina Hering
September 4	Buzău, Romania; Clay; W15; Singles and doubles draws	(Romania) Alexia Iulia Mărginean; 7–6^{(7–3)}, 6–2	(Romania) Anastasia Safta	(Italy) Vittoria Modesti (Romania) Maria Sara Popa	(Romania) Eva Maria Ionescu (Italy) Melania Delai (Italy) Nicole Fossa Huergo (Romania) Simona Ogescu
September 4	Buzău, Romania; Clay; W15; Singles and doubles draws	(Italy) Vittoria Modesti (Turkey) Doğa Türkmen; 0–6, 6–3, [11–9]	(Romania) Iulia Andreea Ionescu (Romania) Anastasia Safta	(Italy) Vittoria Modesti (Romania) Maria Sara Popa	(Romania) Eva Maria Ionescu (Italy) Melania Delai (Italy) Nicole Fossa Huergo (Romania) Simona Ogescu
September 4	Kuršumlijska Banja, Serbia; Clay; W15; Singles and doubles draws	(Serbia) Tamara Čurović; 2–6, 6–2, 6–4	(Serbia) Dunja Marić	(Netherlands) Madelief Hageman (France) Helena Stevic	(Ukraine) Kateryna Lazarenko (Serbia) Andjela Lazarević (Ukraine) Oleksandra Korashvili (Serbia) Natalija Senić
September 4	Kuršumlijska Banja, Serbia; Clay; W15; Singles and doubles draws	(Serbia) Andjela Lazarević (Germany) Tea Lukic; 6–3, 6–2	(Israel) Sofiia Nagornaia; Karine Sarkisova	(Netherlands) Madelief Hageman (France) Helena Stevic	(Ukraine) Kateryna Lazarenko (Serbia) Andjela Lazarević (Ukraine) Oleksandra Korashvili (Serbia) Natalija Senić
September 4	Yeongwol, South Korea; Hard; W15; Singles and doubles draws	(South Korea) Kim Da-bin; 6–2, 6–1	(South Korea) Back Da-yeon	(South Korea) Jeong Su-nam (South Korea) Ahn Yu-jin	(South Korea) Kim Na-ri (South Korea) Lee Eun-hye (South Korea) Lee Su-ha (Japan) Hikaru Sato
September 4	Yeongwol, South Korea; Hard; W15; Singles and doubles draws	(South Korea) Kim Da-bin (South Korea) Kim Na-ri; 6–2, 6–3	(South Korea) Back Da-yeon (South Korea) Jeong Bo-young	(South Korea) Jeong Su-nam (South Korea) Ahn Yu-jin	(South Korea) Kim Na-ri (South Korea) Lee Eun-hye (South Korea) Lee Su-ha (Japan) Hikaru Sato
September 4	Monastir, Tunisia; Hard; W15; Singles and doubles draws	(Egypt) Lamis Alhussein Abdel Aziz; 5–7, 6–4, 6–0	(Italy) Lara Pfeifer	(Portugal) Sara Lança (Poland) Weronika Ewald	(Serbia) Darja Suvirđonkova (South Africa) Nelise Verster (France) Margaux Komano (United States) Julia Ronney
September 4	Monastir, Tunisia; Hard; W15; Singles and doubles draws	(Egypt) Sandra Samir (United Kingdom) Katie Dyson; 6–2, 6–2	(Kazakhstan) Aruzhan Sagandikova (Kazakhstan) Zhanel Rustemova	(Portugal) Sara Lança (Poland) Weronika Ewald	(Serbia) Darja Suvirđonkova (South Africa) Nelise Verster (France) Margaux Komano (United States) Julia Ronney
September 11
September 11	ITF Féminin Le Neubourg; Le Neubourg, France; Hard; W80; Singles – Doubles	(Switzerland) Céline Naef; 4–6, 6–2, 7–6^{(9–7)}	Alina Korneeva	(France) Fiona Ferro (France) Océane Dodin	(Italy) Lucrezia Stefanini (France) Tiphanie Lemaître (France) Jenny Lim (Hungary) Tímea Babos
September 11	ITF Féminin Le Neubourg; Le Neubourg, France; Hard; W80; Singles – Doubles	(France) Fiona Ferro; Alina Korneeva; 7–6^{(9–7)}, 7–5	(Ukraine) Maryna Kolb (Ukraine) Nadiya Kolb	(France) Fiona Ferro (France) Océane Dodin	(Italy) Lucrezia Stefanini (France) Tiphanie Lemaître (France) Jenny Lim (Hungary) Tímea Babos
September 11	Skopje, North Macedonia; Clay; W40; Singles and doubles draws	(Serbia) Dejana Radanović; 6–1, 6–3	(Croatia) Iva Primorac	(North Macedonia) Lina Gjorcheska (Lithuania) Justina Mikulskytė	(France) Léolia Jeanjean (Burundi) Sada Nahimana (Bosnia and Herzegovina) Dea Herdželaš (Turkey) Ayla Aksu
September 11	Skopje, North Macedonia; Clay; W40; Singles and doubles draws	(Kazakhstan) Zhibek Kulambayeva (Lithuania) Justina Mikulskytė; 6–3, 6–4	(Japan) Rina Saigo (Japan) Yukina Saigo	(North Macedonia) Lina Gjorcheska (Lithuania) Justina Mikulskytė	(France) Léolia Jeanjean (Burundi) Sada Nahimana (Bosnia and Herzegovina) Dea Herdželaš (Turkey) Ayla Aksu
September 11	Perth, Australia; Hard; W25; Singles and doubles draws	(Australia) Priscilla Hon; 6–1, 3–6, 6–3	(Australia) Talia Gibson	(Australia) Destanee Aiava (Australia) Taylah Preston	(United States) Mia Horvit (Australia) Petra Hule (Japan) Misaki Matsuda (Australia) Melisa Ercan
September 11	Perth, Australia; Hard; W25; Singles and doubles draws	(Australia) Destanee Aiava (Australia) Maddison Inglis; 6–1, 6–4	(Japan) Misaki Matsuda (Japan) Naho Sato	(Australia) Destanee Aiava (Australia) Taylah Preston	(United States) Mia Horvit (Australia) Petra Hule (Japan) Misaki Matsuda (Australia) Melisa Ercan
September 11	Leiria, Portugal; Hard; W25; Singles and doubles draws	(United Kingdom) Sonay Kartal; 7–6^{(7–5)}, 1–6, 6–3	Anastasia Zakharova	(United States) Madison Sieg (United Kingdom) Amarni Banks	Marina Melnikova (Spain) Eva Guerrero Álvarez (United States) Dalayna Hewitt (China) Tian Fangran
September 11	Leiria, Portugal; Hard; W25; Singles and doubles draws	(Portugal) Francisca Jorge (Portugal) Matilde Jorge; 7–5, 7–6^{(7–5)}	(Belgium) Sofia Costoulas (Switzerland) Jenny Dürst	(United States) Madison Sieg (United Kingdom) Amarni Banks	Marina Melnikova (Spain) Eva Guerrero Álvarez (United States) Dalayna Hewitt (China) Tian Fangran
September 11	Varna, Bulgaria; Clay; W25; Singles and doubles draws	(Romania) Ilona Georgiana Ghioroaie; 6–4, 6–2	Valeriia Olianovskaia	(France) Yasmine Mansouri (Czech Republic) Julie Štruplová	(Italy) Silvia Ambrosio (Slovakia) Nina Vargová; Julia Avdeeva (Slovakia) Eszter Méri
September 11	Varna, Bulgaria; Clay; W25; Singles and doubles draws	(Italy) Lisa Pigato (Latvia) Daniela Vismane; 7–6^{(7–4)}, 7–5	(Romania) Karola Patricia Bejenaru (France) Yasmine Mansouri	(France) Yasmine Mansouri (Czech Republic) Julie Štruplová	(Italy) Silvia Ambrosio (Slovakia) Nina Vargová; Julia Avdeeva (Slovakia) Eszter Méri
September 11	Guiyang, China; Hard; W25; Singles and doubles draws	(China) Guo Hanyu; 7–5, 2–6, 6–4	(China) Liu Fangzhou	(China) Jiang Xinyu (China) Yao Xinxin	(China) Feng Shuo (China) Lu Jiajing (China) Ren Yufei (China) Wang Jiaqi
September 11	Guiyang, China; Hard; W25; Singles and doubles draws	(China) Guo Hanyu (China) Jiang Xinyu; 7–5, 6–4	(Chinese Taipei) Cho I-hsuan (Chinese Taipei) Cho Yi-tsen	(China) Jiang Xinyu (China) Yao Xinxin	(China) Feng Shuo (China) Lu Jiajing (China) Ren Yufei (China) Wang Jiaqi
September 11	Dijon, France; Clay; W15; Singles and doubles draws	(Switzerland) Fiona Ganz; 6–4, 6–7^{(3–7)}, 6–2	(France) Lucie Nguyen Tan	(Spain) Martina Genis Salas; Alexandra Shubladze	(Switzerland) Bojana Klincov (Ukraine) Veronika Podrez (Switzerland) Naïma Karamoko; Anna Chekanskaya
September 11	Dijon, France; Clay; W15; Singles and doubles draws	Polina Bakhmutkina (Belgium) Chelsea Vanhoutte; 6–7^{(2–7)}, 6–4, [10–8]	(France) Astrid Lew Yan Foon (Switzerland) Marie Mettraux	(Spain) Martina Genis Salas; Alexandra Shubladze	(Switzerland) Bojana Klincov (Ukraine) Veronika Podrez (Switzerland) Naïma Karamoko; Anna Chekanskaya
September 11	Kuršumlijska Banja, Serbia; Clay; W15; Singles and doubles draws	(Germany) Mara Guth; 6–4, 2–0 ret.	(Italy) Enola Chiesa	Valery Gynina (Germany) Tea Lukic	(Ukraine) Daria Yesypchuk (Serbia) Jovana Grujić (Sweden) Maja Radenkovic (Poland) Daria Kuczer
September 11	Kuršumlijska Banja, Serbia; Clay; W15; Singles and doubles draws	(Slovakia) Salma Drugdová (Germany) Mara Guth; 5–2 ret.	(Ukraine) Oleksandra Korashvili (Republic of Ireland) Celine Simunyu	Valery Gynina (Germany) Tea Lukic	(Ukraine) Daria Yesypchuk (Serbia) Jovana Grujić (Sweden) Maja Radenkovic (Poland) Daria Kuczer
September 11	Monastir, Tunisia; Hard; W15; Singles and doubles draws	(Kazakhstan) Aruzhan Sagandikova; 7–6^{(8–6)}, 6–0	(India) Vaishnavi Adkar	(Ukraine) Elena Grekul (Lithuania) Andrė Lukošiūtė	(Germany) Luisa Hrda (United States) Patricia Grigoras (Slovakia) Laura Cíleková (Germany) Anja Wildgruber
September 11	Monastir, Tunisia; Hard; W15; Singles and doubles draws	(Lithuania) Andrė Lukošiūtė (United Kingdom) Nell Miller; 6–3, 6–2	(Serbia) Darja Suvirđonkova (Belgium) Amelia Waligora	(Ukraine) Elena Grekul (Lithuania) Andrė Lukošiūtė	(Germany) Luisa Hrda (United States) Patricia Grigoras (Slovakia) Laura Cíleková (Germany) Anja Wildgruber
September 18
September 18	Caldas da Rainha Ladies Open; Caldas da Rainha, Portugal; Hard; W60+H; Singles – Doubles	(Croatia) Petra Marčinko; 6–4, 6–1	(France) Léolia Jeanjean	(Brazil) Laura Pigossi; Alina Korneeva	(Hungary) Tímea Babos (United Kingdom) Sonay Kartal (France) Amandine Hesse (France) Alice Robbe
September 18	Caldas da Rainha Ladies Open; Caldas da Rainha, Portugal; Hard; W60+H; Singles – Doubles	(Portugal) Francisca Jorge (Portugal) Matilde Jorge; 6–1, 2–6, [10–7]	(United States) Ashley Lahey (China) Tian Fangran	(Brazil) Laura Pigossi; Alina Korneeva	(Hungary) Tímea Babos (United Kingdom) Sonay Kartal (France) Amandine Hesse (France) Alice Robbe
September 18	Berkeley Tennis Club Challenge; Berkeley, United States; Hard; W60; Singles – Doubles	(Canada) Marina Stakusic; 6–3, 6–4	(United States) Allie Kiick	(United States) Ellie Douglas (France) Elsa Jacquemot	(United States) Madison Brengle (United States) Jenna DeFalco (United States) Victoria Hu; Tatiana Prozorova
September 18	Berkeley Tennis Club Challenge; Berkeley, United States; Hard; W60; Singles – Doubles	(United States) Jessie Aney (Colombia) María Herazo González; 7–5, 7–5	(Australia) Elysia Bolton (Australia) Alexandra Bozovic	(United States) Ellie Douglas (France) Elsa Jacquemot	(United States) Madison Brengle (United States) Jenna DeFalco (United States) Victoria Hu; Tatiana Prozorova
September 18	Pazardzhik, Bulgaria; Clay; W40; Singles and doubles draws	(Argentina) María Lourdes Carlé; 6–1, 6–2	(Turkey) Çağla Büyükakçay	(Slovenia) Polona Hercog (Romania) Cristina Dinu	(Serbia) Mia Ristić (Greece) Sapfo Sakellaridi (Slovenia) Nika Radišić (Bulgaria) Lia Karatancheva
September 18	Pazardzhik, Bulgaria; Clay; W40; Singles and doubles draws	(Romania) Cristina Dinu (Slovakia) Radka Zelníčková; 1–6, 7–5, [10–6]	(Bulgaria) Gergana Topalova (Latvia) Daniela Vismane	(Slovenia) Polona Hercog (Romania) Cristina Dinu	(Serbia) Mia Ristić (Greece) Sapfo Sakellaridi (Slovenia) Nika Radišić (Bulgaria) Lia Karatancheva
September 18	Perth, Australia; Hard; W25; Singles and doubles draws	(Australia) Taylah Preston; 7–5, 6–1	(Australia) Talia Gibson	(Australia) Priscilla Hon (Japan) Erika Sema	(Japan) Ikumi Yamazaki (Australia) Maddison Inglis (Japan) Naho Sato (Australia) Destanee Aiava
September 18	Perth, Australia; Hard; W25; Singles and doubles draws	(Australia) Destanee Aiava (Australia) Maddison Inglis; 6–3, 7–6^{(7–3)}	(Australia) Talia Gibson (Australia) Taylah Preston	(Australia) Priscilla Hon (Japan) Erika Sema	(Japan) Ikumi Yamazaki (Australia) Maddison Inglis (Japan) Naho Sato (Australia) Destanee Aiava
September 18	Kyoto, Japan; Hard (i); W25; Singles and doubles draws	Sofya Lansere; 6–0, 6–1	(Japan) Hiroko Kuwata	(Mexico) Fernanda Contreras Gómez (Japan) Mayuka Aikawa	(Japan) Sara Saito (Japan) Shiho Akita (Finland) Anastasia Kulikova (Chinese Taipei) Tsao Chia-yi
September 18	Kyoto, Japan; Hard (i); W25; Singles and doubles draws	(Japan) Aoi Ito (Chinese Taipei) Tsao Chia-yi; 6–2, 6–1	(Japan) Hiromi Abe (Japan) Anri Nagata	(Mexico) Fernanda Contreras Gómez (Japan) Mayuka Aikawa	(Japan) Sara Saito (Japan) Shiho Akita (Finland) Anastasia Kulikova (Chinese Taipei) Tsao Chia-yi
September 18	Slobozia, Romania; Clay; W25; Singles and doubles draws	Ekaterina Makarova; 5–7, 6–4, 7-5	(Croatia) Lucija Ćirić Bagarić	(Germany) Ella Seidel (Greece) Valentini Grammatikopoulou	(Czech Republic) Aneta Kučmová; Valeriia Olianovskaia (Romania) Anca Todoni (Romania) Andreea Mitu
September 18	Slobozia, Romania; Clay; W25; Singles and doubles draws	(Romania) Oana Gavrilă (Ukraine) Valeriya Strakhova; 6–2, 7–5	(Romania) Ilona Georgiana Ghioroaie (Romania) Andreea Prisăcariu	(Germany) Ella Seidel (Greece) Valentini Grammatikopoulou	(Czech Republic) Aneta Kučmová; Valeriia Olianovskaia (Romania) Anca Todoni (Romania) Andreea Mitu
September 18	Santa Margherita di Pula, Italy; Clay; W25; Singles and doubles draws	(Germany) Katharina Hobgarski; 7–5, 6–3	(Italy) Federica Bilardo	(Spain) Carlota Martínez Círez (Italy) Deborah Chiesa	(Italy) Martina Colmegna (Finland) Laura Hietaranta (Italy) Diletta Cherubini (Germany) Carolin Raschdorf
September 18	Santa Margherita di Pula, Italy; Clay; W25; Singles and doubles draws	(Slovenia) Živa Falkner (Germany) Katharina Hobgarski; 6–1, 6–2	(France) Yasmine Mansouri (Italy) Miriana Tona	(Spain) Carlota Martínez Círez (Italy) Deborah Chiesa	(Italy) Martina Colmegna (Finland) Laura Hietaranta (Italy) Diletta Cherubini (Germany) Carolin Raschdorf
September 18	Ceuta, Spain; Hard; W25; Singles and doubles draws	Aliona Falei; 6–1, 6–4	(Serbia) Katarina Kozarov	(Netherlands) Lesley Pattinama Kerkhove (Belgium) Sofia Costoulas	(Israel) Lina Glushko (Belgium) Clara Vlasselaer; Kira Pavlova (Spain) Yvonne Cavallé Reimers
September 18	Ceuta, Spain; Hard; W25; Singles and doubles draws	(Spain) Yvonne Cavallé Reimers (Spain) Ángela Fita Boluda; 7–6^{(7–0)}, 6–3	(Serbia) Katarina Kozarov (United States) Madison Sieg	(Netherlands) Lesley Pattinama Kerkhove (Belgium) Sofia Costoulas	(Israel) Lina Glushko (Belgium) Clara Vlasselaer; Kira Pavlova (Spain) Yvonne Cavallé Reimers
September 18	Kuršumlijska Banja, Serbia; Clay; W15; Singles and doubles draws	Elena Pridankina; 7–6^{(7–4)} ret.	(Germany) Mara Guth	(Serbia) Tamara Čurović (Germany) Fabienne Gettwart	(Serbia) Katarina Jokić (Latvia) Valerija Kargina; Mariia Masiianskaia (Greece) Eleni Christofi
September 18	Kuršumlijska Banja, Serbia; Clay; W15; Singles and doubles draws	(Greece) Eleni Christofi (Serbia) Katarina Jokić; 6–2, 6–3	(Germany) Mara Guth; Elena Pridankina	(Serbia) Tamara Čurović (Germany) Fabienne Gettwart	(Serbia) Katarina Jokić (Latvia) Valerija Kargina; Mariia Masiianskaia (Greece) Eleni Christofi
September 18	Sharm El Sheikh, Egypt; Hard; W15; Singles and doubles draws	(Egypt) Sandra Samir; 4–6, 6–4, 6–1	(Romania) Elena-Teodora Cadar	(Slovakia) Katarína Kužmová; Evgeniya Burdina	(Poland) Alicja Formella (United Kingdom) Danielle Daley (Slovakia) Laura Cíleková (Netherlands) Anouck Vrancken Peeters
September 18	Sharm El Sheikh, Egypt; Hard; W15; Singles and doubles draws	(Romania) Elena-Teodora Cadar (Egypt) Sandra Samir; 6–2, 7–5	(India) Ashmitha Easwaramurthi; Anna Sedysheva	(Slovakia) Katarína Kužmová; Evgeniya Burdina	(Poland) Alicja Formella (United Kingdom) Danielle Daley (Slovakia) Laura Cíleková (Netherlands) Anouck Vrancken Peeters
September 18	Monastir, Tunisia; Hard; W15; Singles and doubles draws	(Belgium) Amelia Waligora; 3–6, 6–3, 6–1	(Serbia) Elena Milovanović	(France) Marine Szostak (Kazakhstan) Sandugash Kenzhibayeva	(Italy) Maria Vittoria Viviani (Belgium) Eliessa Vanlangendonck (Italy) Federica Sacco (India) Teja Tirunelveli
September 18	Monastir, Tunisia; Hard; W15; Singles and doubles draws	(Greece) Magdalini Adaloglou (Ukraine) Khrystyna Vozniak; 4–6, 6–3, [10–7]	(India) Vaishnavi Adkar (Brazil) Geórgia Gulin	(France) Marine Szostak (Kazakhstan) Sandugash Kenzhibayeva	(Italy) Maria Vittoria Viviani (Belgium) Eliessa Vanlangendonck (Italy) Federica Sacco (India) Teja Tirunelveli
September 24	Central Coast Pro Tennis Open; Templeton, United States; Hard; W60; Singles – Doubles	(United States) Taylor Townsend; 6–3, 6–1	(Mexico) Renata Zarazúa	(United States) McCartney Kessler; Iryna Shymanovich	(United States) Ann Li (United States) Hanna Chang (United States) Makenna Jones (United States) Katie Volynets
September 24	Central Coast Pro Tennis Open; Templeton, United States; Hard; W60; Singles – Doubles	(United States) McCartney Kessler (United States) Alana Smith; 7–5, 6–4	(United States) Jessie Aney (United States) Jaeda Daniel	(United States) McCartney Kessler; Iryna Shymanovich	(United States) Ann Li (United States) Hanna Chang (United States) Makenna Jones (United States) Katie Volynets
September 24	Nanao, Japan; Carpet; W40; Singles and doubles draws	(China) Ma Yexin; 7–6^{(8–6)}, 6–7^{(0–7)}, 6–0	(Chinese Taipei) Yang Ya-yi	(Chinese Taipei) Tsao Chia-yi (Japan) Miho Kuramochi	(Japan) Mei Yamaguchi (Japan) Kisa Yoshioka (Japan) Funa Kozaki (Japan) Erika Sema
September 24	Nanao, Japan; Carpet; W40; Singles and doubles draws	(Japan) Aoi Ito (Japan) Erika Sema; 6–2, 7–5	(Japan) Miho Kuramochi (Japan) Kanako Morisaki	(Chinese Taipei) Tsao Chia-yi (Japan) Miho Kuramochi	(Japan) Mei Yamaguchi (Japan) Kisa Yoshioka (Japan) Funa Kozaki (Japan) Erika Sema
September 24	Kuršumlijska Banja, Serbia; Clay; W40; Singles and doubles draws	(North Macedonia) Lina Gjorcheska; 6–3, 6–3	(Croatia) Antonia Ružić	(Latvia) Daniela Vismane (Czech Republic) Dominika Šalková	(Belgium) Marie Benoît (Greece) Martha Matoula (France) Loïs Boisson (Serbia) Aleksandra Krunić
September 24	Kuršumlijska Banja, Serbia; Clay; W40; Singles and doubles draws	(Australia) Astra Sharma (Ukraine) Valeriya Strakhova; 6–1, 6–4	Anastasia Gasanova; Ekaterina Makarova	(Latvia) Daniela Vismane (Czech Republic) Dominika Šalková	(Belgium) Marie Benoît (Greece) Martha Matoula (France) Loïs Boisson (Serbia) Aleksandra Krunić
September 24	Santarém, Portugal; Hard; W25; Singles and doubles draws	(Spain) Eva Guerrero Álvarez; 6–2, 4–6, 7–5	(Bosnia and Herzegovina) Nefisa Berberović	(France) Margaux Rouvroy (Croatia) Lea Bošković	(Liechtenstein) Kathinka von Deichmann (Poland) Urszula Radwańska (Georgia (country)) Mariam Bolkvadze (Spain) Nuria Párrizas Díaz
September 24	Santarém, Portugal; Hard; W25; Singles and doubles draws	(United States) Dalayna Hewitt (United States) Madison Sieg; 4–6, 6–2, [12–10]	(Ukraine) Maryna Kolb (Ukraine) Nadiya Kolb	(France) Margaux Rouvroy (Croatia) Lea Bošković	(Liechtenstein) Kathinka von Deichmann (Poland) Urszula Radwańska (Georgia (country)) Mariam Bolkvadze (Spain) Nuria Párrizas Díaz
September 24	Santa Margherita di Pula, Italy; Clay; W25; Singles and doubles draws	(Czech Republic) Nikola Bartůňková; 6–0, 1–0 ret.	(Germany) Katharina Hobgarski	(Romania) Miriam Bulgaru (Finland) Laura Hietaranta	(Spain) Yvonne Cavallé Reimers (Switzerland) Nadine Keller (Italy) Tatiana Pieri (Spain) Carlota Martínez Círez
September 24	Santa Margherita di Pula, Italy; Clay; W25; Singles and doubles draws	(Georgia (country)) Ekaterine Gorgodze (Germany) Katharina Hobgarski; 6–2, 6–4	(Spain) Yvonne Cavallé Reimers (Italy) Aurora Zantedeschi	(Romania) Miriam Bulgaru (Finland) Laura Hietaranta	(Spain) Yvonne Cavallé Reimers (Switzerland) Nadine Keller (Italy) Tatiana Pieri (Spain) Carlota Martínez Círez
September 24	Luján, Argentina; Clay; W25; Singles and doubles draws	(France) Séléna Janicijevic; 6–4, 7–6^{(7–0)}	(Argentina) Julieta Lara Estable	(Argentina) Martina Capurro Taborda (Argentina) Solana Sierra	(Argentina) Berta Bonardi (Argentina) Luisina Giovannini (Italy) Nicole Fossa Huergo (Argentina) Carla Markus
September 24	Luján, Argentina; Clay; W25; Singles and doubles draws	(Argentina) Martina Capurro Taborda (Chile) Fernanda Labraña; 6–2, 7–5	(Italy) Nicole Fossa Huergo (Germany) Luisa Meyer auf der Heide	(Argentina) Martina Capurro Taborda (Argentina) Solana Sierra	(Argentina) Berta Bonardi (Argentina) Luisina Giovannini (Italy) Nicole Fossa Huergo (Argentina) Carla Markus
September 24	Sharm El Sheikh, Egypt; Hard; W15; Singles and doubles draws	(Poland) Martyna Kubka; 6–3, 6–0	(Slovakia) Katarína Kužmová	(Egypt) Sandra Samir; Kristiana Sidorova	(Egypt) Yasmin Ezzat (Germany) Caroline Brack (Switzerland) Paula Cembranos (Slovakia) Laura Cíleková
September 24	Sharm El Sheikh, Egypt; Hard; W15; Singles and doubles draws	(Romania) Elena-Teodora Cadar (Egypt) Sandra Samir; 6–1, 6–4	(Poland) Zuzanna Bednarz (Slovakia) Laura Cíleková	(Egypt) Sandra Samir; Kristiana Sidorova	(Egypt) Yasmin Ezzat (Germany) Caroline Brack (Switzerland) Paula Cembranos (Slovakia) Laura Cíleková
September 24	Monastir, Tunisia; Hard; W15; Singles and doubles draws	(France) Diana Martynov; 6–4, 6–2	(Poland) Gina Feistel	(United Kingdom) Ranah Stoiber (Italy) Viola Turini	(Spain) Lucía Llinares Domingo (Ukraine) Yelyzaveta Kotliar (United States) Sofia Camila Rojas (Germany) Emily Welker
September 24	Monastir, Tunisia; Hard; W15; Singles and doubles draws	(Germany) Laura Böhner (Poland) Gina Feistel; 7–5, 6–0	(Brazil) Geórgia Gulin (Italy) Camilla Zanolini	(United Kingdom) Ranah Stoiber (Italy) Viola Turini	(Spain) Lucía Llinares Domingo (Ukraine) Yelyzaveta Kotliar (United States) Sofia Camila Rojas (Germany) Emily Welker
September 24	Hilton Head, United States; Clay; W15; Singles and doubles draws	(France) Sophia Biolay; 4–6, 6–2, 6–4	(Japan) Wakana Sonobe	(Argentina) María Florencia Urrutia (Canada) Layne Sleeth	Kira Matushkina (Germany) Jantje Tilbürger (United States) Salma Ewing (Chinese Taipei) Hsu Chieh-yu
September 24	Hilton Head, United States; Clay; W15; Singles and doubles draws	(Chinese Taipei) Hsu Chieh-yu (United States) Mia Yamakita; 6–2, 7–5	(Peru) Lucciana Pérez Alarcón (Japan) Wakana Sonobe	(Argentina) María Florencia Urrutia (Canada) Layne Sleeth	Kira Matushkina (Germany) Jantje Tilbürger (United States) Salma Ewing (Chinese Taipei) Hsu Chieh-yu
