= 2023 ITS Cup – Singles =

Singles
- 2023 ITS Cup

Final
- Champion: (Latvia) Darja Semeņistaja
- Runner-up: (Croatia) Lea Bošković
- Score: 6–7^{(6–8)}, 6–3, 6–1

Events
Singles	Doubles
- ITS Cup

Sára Bejlek was the two-time defending champion but choose not to participate.

Darja Semeņistaja won the tournament after defeating Lea Bošković 6–7^{(6–8)}, 6–3, 6–1 in the final.

== Seeds ==
All seeds received a bye into the second round.

1. (Spain) Leyre Romero Gormaz (quarterfinals)
2. (Spain) Rosa Vicens Mas (third round)
3. (Latvia) Darja Semeņistaja (champion)
4. (Belgium) Marie Benoît (quarterfinals)
5. (North Macedonia) Lina Gjorcheska (third round)
6. (Romania) Alexandra Cadanțu-Ignatik (semifinals)
7. Yuliya Hatouka (quarterfinals)
8. (Croatia) Lea Bošković (final)
9. (Poland) Weronika Falkowska (third round)
10. (Poland) Katarzyna Kawa (second round)
11. (Greece) Sapfo Sakellaridi (third round)
12. (Italy) Silvia Ambrosio (second round)
13. (United States) Maria Mateas (second round)
14. (Czech Republic) Tereza Smitková (second round)
15. (Czech Republic) Julie Štruplová (second round)
16. (Czech Republic) Aneta Kučmová (second round)

== Draw ==
Key

- Q = Qualifier
- WC = Wild card
- LL = Lucky loser
- Alt = Alternate
- ITF = ITF entry
- PR = Protected ranking
- SR = Special ranking
- SE = Special exempt
- JE = Junior exempt
- JR = Junior Accelerator Programme entrant
- CO = College Accelerator Programme entrant
- NG = Next Gen Accelerator Program entrant
- w/o = Walkover
- r = Retired
- d = Defaulted

=== Finals ===
Quarterfinals
1	(Spain) Leyre Romero Gormaz	3	1
6	(Romania) Alexandra Cadanțu-Ignatik	6	6
3	(Latvia) Darja Semeņistaja	6	6
WC	(Czech Republic) Tereza Valentová	4	4
8	(Croatia) Lea Bošković	3	6	6
4	(Belgium) Marie Benoît	6	2	2
7	Yuliya Hatouka	4	2
(France) Sara Cakarevic	6	6

Semifinals
6	(Romania) Alexandra Cadanțu-Ignatik	3	3
3	(Latvia) Darja Semeņistaja	6	6
8	(Croatia) Lea Bošković	6	4	6
(France) Sara Cakarevic	3	6	3

Final
3	(Latvia) Darja Semeņistaja	6^{6}	6	6
8	(Croatia) Lea Bošković	7^{8}	3	1

=== Top half ===
==== Section 1 ====
First round
(Kazakhstan) Z Kulambayeva	6	2	5
Q	(Switzerland) L Küng	3	6	7
(Italy) L Pigato	6	4	4
Q	(Germany) N Siedliska	2	6	6
WC	(Slovakia) N Kročková	3	4
(France) A Ramé	6	6
Q	(Slovakia) A Jašková	5	6	6
LL	(Germany) T Morderger	7	4	1

Second round
1	(Spain) L Romero Gormaz	4	6	6
Q	(Switzerland) L Küng	6	2	3
Q	(Germany) N Siedliska	4
13	(United States) M Mateas	1^{r}
9	(Poland) W Falkowska	4	6	6
(France) A Ramé	6	4	4
Q	(Slovakia) A Jašková	5	0
6	(Romania) A Cadanțu-Ignatik	7	6

Third round
1	(Spain) L Romero Gormaz	6	6
Q	(Germany) N Siedliska	0	4
9	(Poland) W Falkowska	2	6	4
6	(Romania) A Cadanțu-Ignatik	6	3	6

Quarterfinals
1	(Spain) L Romero Gormaz	3	1
6	(Romania) A Cadanțu-Ignatik	6	6

==== Section 2 ====
First round
(Czech Republic) A Laboutková	6	1	2
Q	(Czech Republic) D Hindová	1	6	6
K Laskutova	2	5
Q	(Germany) A Gabric	6	7
(France) T Lemaître	6	2	1
WC	(Czech Republic) T Valentová	3	6	6
(Colombia) M Herazo González	2	6	2
(Australia) TN Smith	6	0	6

Second round
3	(Latvia) D Semeņistaja	6	7^{7}
Q	(Czech Republic) D Hindová	1	6^{5}
Q	(Germany) A Gabric	6	7^{7}
14	(Czech Republic) T Smitková	0	6^{1}
12	(Italy) S Ambrosio	1	1
WC	(Czech Republic) T Valentová	6	6
(Australia) TN Smith	6	6^{3}	2
5	(North Macedonia) L Gjorcheska	2	7^{7}	6

Third round
3	(Latvia) D Semeņistaja	7	6
Q	(Germany) A Gabric	5	2
WC	(Czech Republic) T Valentová	7	7^{13}
5	(North Macedonia) L Gjorcheska	5	6^{11}

Quarterfinals
3	(Latvia) D Semeņistaja	6	6
WC	(Czech Republic) T Valentová	4	4

=== Bottom half ===
==== Section 3 ====
First round
(Czech Republic) L Klimovičová	2	7^{7}	6
(Italy) M Tona	6	6^{3}	3
Q	(Italy) S Rocchetti	7	2	4
(Netherlands) L Stevens	5	6	6
(Slovakia) E Méri	6	2	6
WC	(Czech Republic) K Tomajková	3	6	4
(Germany) Y Morderger	6^{2}	1
(Sweden) L Zaar	7^{7}	6

Second round
8	(Croatia) L Bošković	6^{4}	6	6
(Czech Republic) L Klimovičová	7^{7}	0	1
(Netherlands) L Stevens	1	6	4
11	(Greece) S Sakellaridi	6	2	6
16	(Czech Republic) A Kučmová	2	2^{r}
(Slovakia) E Méri	6	5
(Sweden) L Zaar	3	2
4	(Belgium) M Benoît	6	6

Third round
8	(Croatia) L Bošković	6	6
11	(Greece) S Sakellaridi	3	2
(Slovakia) E Méri	3	0
4	(Belgium) M Benoît	6	6

Quarterfinals
8	(Croatia) L Bošković	3	6	6
4	(Belgium) M Benoît	6	2	2

==== Section 4 ====
First round
Q	(Italy) F Di Sarra	6^{0}	1
Q	(Czech Republic) I Šebestová	7^{7}	6
(Romania) K Bejenaru	0	1
(Slovenia) P Lovrič	6	6
(France) S Cakarevic	6	6
WC	(Latvia) J Denisenko	0	0
(Japan) N Hanatani	6	6
WC	(Latvia) D Feldmane	1	1

Second round
7	Y Hatouka	5	7^{10}	6
Q	(Czech Republic) I Šebestová	7	6^{8}	4
(Slovenia) P Lovrič	6	0
10	(Poland) K Kawa	1	0^{r}
15	(Czech Republic) J Štruplová	3	6	6^{4}
(France) S Cakarevic	6	3	7^{7}
(Japan) N Hanatani	0	2
2	(Spain) R Vicens Mas	6	6

Third round
7	Y Hatouka	6	6
(Slovenia) P Lovrič	4	3
(France) S Cakarevic	6	7^{7}
2	(Spain) R Vicens Mas	3	6^{1}

Quarterfinals
7	Y Hatouka	4	2
(France) S Cakarevic	6	6
