= 2023 ITS Cup =

Tennis tournament

- Date: 17–23 July 2023
- Edition: 14th
- Category: ITF Women's World Tennis Tour
- Prize money: $60,000
- Surface: Clay / Outdoor
- Location: Olomouc, Czech Republic

Champions

Singles
- (Latvia) Darja Semeņistaja

Doubles
- (Czech Republic) Magdaléna Smékalová / (Czech Republic) Tereza Valentová
- ITS Cup

The 2023 ITS Cup was a professional tennis tournament played on outdoor clay courts. It was the fourteenth edition of the tournament, which was part of the 2023 ITF Women's World Tennis Tour. It took place in Olomouc, Czech Republic, between 17 and 23 July 2023.

== Champions ==
=== Singles ===
- (Latvia) Darja Semeņistaja def. (Croatia) Lea Bošković, 6–7^{(6–8)}, 6–3, 6–1

=== Doubles ===
- (Czech Republic) Magdaléna Smékalová / (Czech Republic) Tereza Valentová def. (Kazakhstan) Zhibek Kulambayeva / (Latvia) Darja Semeņistaja, 6–2, 6–2

== Singles main draw entrants ==
=== Seeds ===
Country	Player	Rank	Seed
ESP	Leyre Romero Gormaz	186	1
ESP	Rosa Vicens Mas	206	2
LAT	Darja Semeņistaja	209	3
BEL	Marie Benoît	226	4
MKD	Lina Gjorcheska	249	5
ROU	Alexandra Cadanțu-Ignatik	253	6
	Yuliya Hatouka	259	7
CRO	Lea Bošković	272	8
POL	Weronika Falkowska	276	9
POL	Katarzyna Kawa	277	10
GRE	Sapfo Sakellaridi	309	11
ITA	Silvia Ambrosio	346	12
USA	Maria Mateas	352	13
CZE	Tereza Smitková	361	14
CZE	Julie Štruplová	376	15
CZE	Aneta Kučmová	391	16

- Rankings are as of 10 July 2023.

=== Other entrants ===
The following players received wildcards into the singles main draw:

- (Latvia) Jana Denisenko
- (Latvia) Daniela Dārta Feldmane
- (Slovakia) Natália Kročková
- (Czech Republic) Kristýna Tomajková
- (Czech Republic) Tereza Valentová

The following players received entry from the qualifying draw:

- (Italy) Federica Di Sarra
- (Germany) Anna Gabric
- (Czech Republic) Denisa Hindová
- (Slovakia) Anika Jašková
- (Switzerland) Leonie Küng
- (Italy) Sofia Rocchetti
- (Czech Republic) Ivana Šebestová
- (Germany) Natalia Siedliska

The following player received entry as a lucky loser:

- (Germany) Tayisiya Morderger
