= 2023 ITS Cup – Doubles =

Doubles
- 2023 ITS Cup

Final
- Champions: (Czech Republic) Magdaléna Smékalová (Czech Republic) Tereza Valentová
- Runners-up: (Kazakhstan) Zhibek Kulambayeva (Latvia) Darja Semeņistaja
- Score: 6–2, 6–2

Events
Singles	Doubles
- ITS Cup

Giulia Gatto-Monticone and Sada Nahimana were the defending champions but chose not to participate.

Magdaléna Smékalová and Tereza Valentová won the title, defeating Zhibek Kulambayeva and Darja Semeņistaja in the final, 6–2, 6–2.

== Seeds ==
1. (Greece) Sapfo Sakellaridi / (Netherlands) Lexie Stevens (semifinals)
2. (Kazakhstan) Zhibek Kulambayeva / (Latvia) Darja Semeņistaja (final)
3. (Colombia) María Herazo González / Ksenia Laskutova (quarterfinals)
4. (Czech Republic) Denisa Hindová / (Czech Republic) Karolína Kubáňová (semifinals)

== Draw ==
Key

- Q = Qualifier
- WC = Wild card
- LL = Lucky loser
- Alt = Alternate
- ITF = ITF entry
- PR = Protected ranking
- SR = Special ranking
- SE = Special exempt
- JE = Junior exempt
- JR = Junior Accelerator Programme entrant
- CO = College Accelerator Programme entrant
- NG = Next Gen Accelerator Program entrant
- w/o = Walkover
- r = Retired
- d = Defaulted

First round
1	(Greece) S Sakellaridi (Netherlands) L Stevens	6	6
(Japan) N Hanatani (Australia) TN Smith	1	1
(Italy) S Rocchetti (Italy) M Tona	6	6
WC	(Latvia) J Denisenko (Latvia) DD Feldmane	0	1
3	(Colombia) M Herazo González; K Laskutova	6	6
(Czech Republic) A Kučmová (Czech Republic) J Štruplová	3	2
(Czech Republic) I Heinzová (Czech Republic) J Paštiková	1	1
WC	(Czech Republic) M Smékalová (Czech Republic) T Valentová	6	6
(Germany) T Morderger (Germany) Y Morderger	3	6	[6]
(Slovenia) P Lovrič (Slovakia) E Méri	6	4	[10]
(Czech Republic) L Ševčíková (Germany) N Siedliska	3	2
4	(Czech Republic) D Hindová (Czech Republic) K Kubáňová	6	6
(Czech Republic) A Laboutková (Czech Republic) I Šebestová	1	7	[10]
WC	(Czech Republic) D Hrdinková (Czech Republic) K Tomajková	6	5	[3]
(Romania) KP Bejenaru (France) T Lemaître	4	6	[12]
2	(Kazakhstan) Z Kulambayeva (Latvia) D Semeņistaja	6	3	[14]

Quarterfinals
1	(Greece) S Sakellaridi (Netherlands) L Stevens	6	6
(Italy) S Rocchetti (Italy) M Tona	3	4
3	(Colombia) M Herazo González; K Laskutova	3	4
WC	(Czech Republic) M Smékalová (Czech Republic) T Valentová	6	6
(Slovenia) P Lovrič (Slovakia) E Méri	3	0
4	(Czech Republic) D Hindová (Czech Republic) K Kubáňová	6	6
(Czech Republic) A Laboutková (Czech Republic) I Šebestová	4	2
2	(Kazakhstan) Z Kulambayeva (Latvia) D Semeņistaja	6	6

Semifinals
1	(Greece) S Sakellaridi (Netherlands) L Stevens	5	2
WC	(Czech Republic) M Smékalová (Czech Republic) T Valentová	7	6
4	(Czech Republic) D Hindová (Czech Republic) K Kubáňová	4	3
2	(Kazakhstan) Z Kulambayeva (Latvia) D Semeņistaja	6	6

Final
WC	(Czech Republic) M Smékalová (Czech Republic) T Valentová	6	6
2	(Kazakhstan) Z Kulambayeva (Latvia) D Semeņistaja	2	2
