= Magdaléna Smékalová =

Czech tennis player

- Country (sports): Czech Republic
- Born: 17 January 2006 (age 19)
- Plays: Right-handed (two-handed backhand)
- Prize money: $7,509

Singles
- Career record: 20–18
- Career titles: 0
- Highest ranking: No. 1133 (8 September 2025)
- Current ranking: No. 1151 (18 August 2025)

Doubles
- Career record: 17–11
- Career titles: 2 ITF
- Highest ranking: No. 574 (31 July 2023)
- Current ranking: No. 770 (18 August 2025)
- Last updated on: 18 August 2025.

Magdaléna Smékalová (born 17 January 2006) is a Czech tennis player.

Smékalová has a career-high doubles ranking by the WTA of 574, achieved on 31 July 2023.

Smékalová has won one doubles titles on the ITF Women's Circuit. Smékalová won her first $60k tournament in July 2023 at the Olomouc Open in Czech Republic, alongside compatriot Tereza Valentová.

== ITF Circuit finals ==
=== Doubles: 2 (2 titles) ===
Legend W60/75 tournaments (1–0) W15 tournaments (1–0)	Finals by surface Clay (2–0)

Result	W–L	Date	Tournament	Tier	Surface	Partner	Opponents	Score
Win	1–0	Jul 2023	ITS Cup Olomouc, Czech Republic	W60	Clay	(Czech Republic) Tereza Valentová	(Kazakhstan) Zhibek Kulambayeva (Latvia) Darja Semeņistaja	6–2, 6–2
Win	2–0	Aug 2025	ITF Slovenske Konjice, Slovenia	W15	Clay	(Slovakia) Salma Drugdová	(Italy) Maddalena Giordano (Slovenia) Lara Smejkal	7–5, 2–6, [13–11]
