= Natalia Siedliska =

German tennis player

- Country (sports): POL (2010–2015); GER (2015–)
- Born: 9 December 1995 (age 30) Łódź, Poland
- Plays: Right-handed
- College: Saint Leo, FIU, Lynn
- Prize money: $84,044

Singles
- Career record: 239–189
- Career titles: 4 ITF
- Highest ranking: No. 487 (14 August 2023)

Doubles
- Career record: 192–114
- Career titles: 22 ITF
- Highest ranking: No. 412 (16 February 2015)

Natalia Siedliska (born 9 December 1995) is a Polish-born German tennis player.

Siedliska has a career high WTA singles ranking of world No. 487, achieved on 14 August 2023, and a career high WTA doubles ranking of No. 412, achieved on 16 February 2015. From 2011 to 2024, she won four singles titles and 22 doubles titles on the ITF Women's Circuit. Her last appearance was in Antalya, Turkiye in January 2025.

In 2023, Siedliska won her first W40 tournament in doubles in Arequipa, Peru.

== College tennis ==
She played college tennis at a variety of schools around the United States, starting at Saint Leo before playing at FIU and Lynn. She also enrolled at Indiana University East to receive further education through the WTA-led Women's Tennis Benefits Association's partnership with the school.

== ITF Circuit finals ==
=== Singles: 8 (4 titles, 4 runner-ups) ===
Finals by surface
Hard (1–1)
Clay (2–2)
Carpet (1–1)

Result	W–L	Date	Tournament	Tier	Surface	Opponent	Score
Loss	0–1	Nov 2013	ITF Heraklion, Greece	10,000	Carpet	(France) Laëtitia Sarrazin	5–7, 2–6
Win	1–1	Nov 2013	ITF Heraklion, Greece	10,000	Carpet	(Czech Republic) Vendula Žovincová	6–1, 6–4
Loss	1–2	May 2015	ITF Puszczykowo, Poland	10,000	Hard	(Georgia (country)) Sofia Kvatsabaia	1–6, 1–6
Win	2–2	Feb 2018	ITF Hammamet, Tunisia	15,000	Clay	(Italy) Angelica Moratelli	3–6, 6–3, 6–3
Loss	2–3	Jun 2018	ITF Hammamet, Tunisia	15,000	Clay	(Chile) Fernanda Brito	2–6, ret.
Loss	2–4	Nov 2022	ITF Castellón, Spain	W15	Clay	Alina Charaeva	6–7^{(4–7)}. 3–6
Win	3–4	May 2023	ITF Antalya, Turkey	W15	Clay	(Romania) Maria Sara Popa	6–3, 6–2
Win	4–4	Jun 2023	ITF Monastir, Tunisia	W15	Hard	(United Kingdom) Kristina Paskauskas	6–3, 6–2

=== Doubles: 32 (22 titles, 10 runner-ups) ===
Legend $40,000 tournaments (1–0) $25,000 tournaments (0–2) $10/15,000 tournaments (21–8)	Finals by surface Hard (5–3) Clay (16–6) Carpet (1–1)
