= 2022 Christus Health Pro Challenge =

Tennis tournament

- Date: 24–30 October 2022
- Edition: 6th
- Category: ITF Women's World Tennis Tour
- Prize money: $80,000
- Surface: Hard / Outdoor
- Location: Tyler, Texas, United States

Champions

Singles
- (United States) Taylor Townsend

Doubles
- Maria Kozyreva / (United States) Ashley Lahey
← 2021 ·	Tyler Pro Challenge	· 2023 →

The 2022 Christus Health Pro Challenge was a professional tennis tournament played on outdoor hard courts. It was the sixth edition of the tournament which was part of the 2022 ITF Women's World Tennis Tour. It took place in Tyler, Texas, United States between 24 and 30 October 2022.

== Champions ==
=== Singles ===
- (United States) Taylor Townsend def. (China) Yuan Yue, 6–4, 6–2

=== Doubles ===
- Maria Kozyreva / (United States) Ashley Lahey def. (United States) Jaeda Daniel / (United Kingdom) Nell Miller, 7–5, 6–2

== Singles main draw entrants ==
=== Seeds ===
Country	Player	Rank^{1}	Seed
EST	Kaia Kanepi	29	1
USA	Madison Brengle	49	2
HUN	Panna Udvardy	81	3
CHN	Yuan Yue	83	4
USA	Katie Volynets	119	5
ROU	Gabriela Lee	147	6
MEX	Marcela Zacarías	162	7
ARG	María Lourdes Carlé	173	8

- ^{1} Rankings are as of 17 October 2022.

=== Other entrants ===
The following players received wildcards into the singles main draw:

- (United States) Hina Inoue
- (United States) Sofia Kenin
- (United States) Maria Mateas
- (United States) Alana Smith

The following player received entry into the singles main draw using a protected ranking:

- (Colombia) Emiliana Arango

The following players received entry from the qualifying draw:

- (United States) Alexis Blokhina
- (Serbia) Katarina Kozarov
- Maria Kozyreva
- (Australia) Ellen Perez
- (United States) Abigail Rencheli
- (United States) Malaika Rapolu
- (Germany) Alexandra Vecic
- (United States) Allura Zamarripa
