= 2020 ITF Women's World Tennis Tour (October–December) =

The 2020 ITF Women's World Tennis Tour is the 2020 edition of the second-tier tour for women's professional tennis. It is organised by the International Tennis Federation and is a tier below the WTA Tour. The ITF Women's World Tennis Tour includes tournaments with prize money ranging from $15,000 up to $100,000.

== Key ==
Category
W100 tournaments
W80 tournaments
W60 tournaments
W25 tournaments
W15 tournaments

== Month ==
=== October ===
Week of	Tournament	Winner	Runners-up	Semifinalists	Quarterfinalists
October 5	Sharm El Sheikh, Egypt; Hard; W15; Singles and Doubles Draws	(Ukraine) Ganna Poznikhirenko; 6–2, 6–4	(Egypt) Sandra Samir	(Russia) Daria Kudashova (Ukraine) Valeriya Strakhova	(United States) Dasha Ivanova (Kazakhstan) Yekaterina Dmitrichenko (Kazakhstan) Gozal Ainitdinova (Russia) Mariia Tkacheva
October 5	Sharm El Sheikh, Egypt; Hard; W15; Singles and Doubles Draws	(Kazakhstan) Gozal Ainitdinova (Kazakhstan) Zhibek Kulambayeva; 6–1, 2–6, [12–10]	(Kazakhstan) Yekaterina Dmitrichenko (Kazakhstan) Kamila Kerimbayeva	(Russia) Daria Kudashova (Ukraine) Valeriya Strakhova	(United States) Dasha Ivanova (Kazakhstan) Yekaterina Dmitrichenko (Kazakhstan) Gozal Ainitdinova (Russia) Mariia Tkacheva
October 5	Monastir, Tunisia; Hard; W15; Singles and Doubles Draws	(Spain) Yvonne Cavallé Reimers; 6–3, 7–6^{(7–4)}	(Argentina) María Lourdes Carlé	(Russia) Anna Ukolova (Estonia) Elena Malõgina	(Chile) Bárbara Gatica (Russia) Anna Ureke (France) Yasmine Mansouri (Germany) Mina Hodzic
October 5	Monastir, Tunisia; Hard; W15; Singles and Doubles Draws	(Spain) Yvonne Cavallé Reimers (Belgium) Eliessa Vanlangendonck; 6–4, 7–6^{(7–4)}	(Chile) Bárbara Gatica (Brazil) Rebeca Pereira	(Russia) Anna Ukolova (Estonia) Elena Malõgina	(Chile) Bárbara Gatica (Russia) Anna Ureke (France) Yasmine Mansouri (Germany) Mina Hodzic
October 12	Cherbourg-en-Cotentin, France; Hard (indoor); W25; Singles and Doubles Draws	(Estonia) Kaia Kanepi; 6–4, 6–4	(United Kingdom) Harriet Dart	(United Kingdom) Jodie Burrage (Germany) Jule Niemeier	(Turkey) Çağla Büyükakçay (China) Wang Xinyu (United States) Robin Montgomery (Spain) Georgina García Pérez
October 12	Cherbourg-en-Cotentin, France; Hard (indoor); W25; Singles and Doubles Draws	(United States) Robin Anderson (France) Jessika Ponchet; 4–6, 6–4, [10–8]	(United Kingdom) Harriet Dart (United Kingdom) Sarah Beth Grey	(United Kingdom) Jodie Burrage (Germany) Jule Niemeier	(Turkey) Çağla Büyükakçay (China) Wang Xinyu (United States) Robin Montgomery (Spain) Georgina García Pérez
October 12	Sharm El Sheikh, Egypt; Hard; W15; Singles and Doubles Draws	(Egypt) Sandra Samir; 6–4, 6–2	(Chinese Taipei) Joanna Garland	(Kazakhstan) Zhibek Kulambayeva (Russia) Anna Morgina	(Russia) Mariia Tkacheva (United States) Emma Davis (United States) Dasha Ivanova (United States) Anna Ulyashchenko
October 12	Sharm El Sheikh, Egypt; Hard; W15; Singles and Doubles Draws	(Ukraine) Viktoriia Dema (Poland) Martyna Kubka; 6–4, 6–3	(United Kingdom) Emily Arbuthnott (United Kingdom) Freya Christie	(Kazakhstan) Zhibek Kulambayeva (Russia) Anna Morgina	(Russia) Mariia Tkacheva (United States) Emma Davis (United States) Dasha Ivanova (United States) Anna Ulyashchenko
October 12	Funchal, Portugal; Hard; W15; Singles and Doubles Draws	(Brazil) Beatriz Haddad Maia; 6–3, 6–3	(Portugal) Francisca Jorge	(Brazil) Ingrid Gamarra Martins (Netherlands) Arianne Hartono	(Germany) Jantje Tilbürger (Netherlands) Lexie Stevens (United States) Alexandra Yepifanova (Norway) Malene Helgø
October 12	Funchal, Portugal; Hard; W15; Singles and Doubles Draws	(Netherlands) Arianne Hartono (Netherlands) Eva Vedder; 4–6, 6–1, [10–7]	(Brazil) Ingrid Gamarra Martins (Brazil) Beatriz Haddad Maia	(Brazil) Ingrid Gamarra Martins (Netherlands) Arianne Hartono	(Germany) Jantje Tilbürger (Netherlands) Lexie Stevens (United States) Alexandra Yepifanova (Norway) Malene Helgø
October 12	Monastir, Tunisia; Hard; W15; Singles and Doubles Draws	(Argentina) María Lourdes Carlé; 6–3, 2–6, 6–1	(Poland) Weronika Falkowska	(Chile) Bárbara Gatica (Spain) Yvonne Cavallé Reimers	(Bulgaria) Dia Evtimova (Russia) Anna Ureke (Algeria) Inès Ibbou (Russia) Anna Ukolova
October 12	Monastir, Tunisia; Hard; W15; Singles and Doubles Draws	(Chile) Bárbara Gatica (Brazil) Rebeca Pereira; 3–6, 7–6^{(7–3)}, [17–15]	(Poland) Weronika Falkowska (Germany) Lisa Ponomar	(Chile) Bárbara Gatica (Spain) Yvonne Cavallé Reimers	(Bulgaria) Dia Evtimova (Russia) Anna Ureke (Algeria) Inès Ibbou (Russia) Anna Ukolova
October 19	Mercer Tennis Classic; Macon, United States; Hard; W80; Singles Draw – Doubles Draw	(United States) Catherine Bellis; 6–4, 6–7^{(4–7)}, 0–0, ret.	(Ukraine) Marta Kostyuk	(Poland) Magdalena Fręch (United States) Varvara Lepchenko	(Japan) Misaki Doi (United States) Francesca Di Lorenzo (Italy) Sara Errani (United States) Sachia Vickery
October 19	Mercer Tennis Classic; Macon, United States; Hard; W80; Singles Draw – Doubles Draw	(Poland) Magdalena Fręch (Poland) Katarzyna Kawa; 7–5, 6–1	(United States) Francesca Di Lorenzo (United States) Jamie Loeb	(Poland) Magdalena Fręch (United States) Varvara Lepchenko	(Japan) Misaki Doi (United States) Francesca Di Lorenzo (Italy) Sara Errani (United States) Sachia Vickery
October 19	Reims, France; Hard (indoor); W25; Singles and Doubles Draws	(France) Océane Dodin; 6–4, 6–2	(Russia) Liudmila Samsonova	(Croatia) Ana Konjuh (China) Wang Xinyu	(Turkey) Çağla Büyükakçay (United Kingdom) Harriet Dart (France) Clara Burel (United States) Robin Montgomery
October 19	Reims, France; Hard (indoor); W25; Singles and Doubles Draws	(France) Séléna Janicijevic (United States) Robin Montgomery; Walkover	(United Kingdom) Harriet Dart (United Kingdom) Sarah Beth Grey	(Croatia) Ana Konjuh (China) Wang Xinyu	(Turkey) Çağla Büyükakçay (United Kingdom) Harriet Dart (France) Clara Burel (United States) Robin Montgomery
October 19	Sharm El Sheikh, Egypt; Hard; W15; Singles and Doubles Draws	(Chinese Taipei) Joanna Garland; 6–3, 3–6, 6–3	(United Kingdom) Katie Boulter	(Russia) Anastasia Gasanova (Belgium) Hélène Scholsen	(Egypt) Lamis Alhussein Abdel Aziz (Russia) Anastasia Tikhonova (France) Manon Léonard (Russia) Noel Saidenova
October 19	Sharm El Sheikh, Egypt; Hard; W15; Singles and Doubles Draws	(Russia) Veronika Pepelyaeva (Russia) Anastasia Tikhonova; 4–6, 6–3, [10–6]	(Canada) Bianca Fernandez (Canada) Leylah Annie Fernandez	(Russia) Anastasia Gasanova (Belgium) Hélène Scholsen	(Egypt) Lamis Alhussein Abdel Aziz (Russia) Anastasia Tikhonova (France) Manon Léonard (Russia) Noel Saidenova
October 19	Monastir, Tunisia; Hard; W15; Singles and Doubles Draws	(Germany) Sina Herrmann; 6–4, 6–4	(Chile) Bárbara Gatica	(France) Alice Robbe (Argentina) María Lourdes Carlé	(Latvia) Darja Semenistaja (Algeria) Inès Ibbou (Estonia) Elena Malõgina (Germany) Lisa Ponomar
October 19	Monastir, Tunisia; Hard; W15; Singles and Doubles Draws	(Poland) Weronika Falkowska (Germany) Lisa Ponomar; 6–1, 6–0	(Russia) Anna Ureke (Russia) Ekaterina Vishnevskaya	(France) Alice Robbe (Argentina) María Lourdes Carlé	(Latvia) Darja Semenistaja (Algeria) Inès Ibbou (Estonia) Elena Malõgina (Germany) Lisa Ponomar
October 26	Bellatorum Resources Pro Classic; Tyler, United States; Hard; W80; Singles Draw – Doubles Draw	(United States) Ann Li; 7–5, 1–6, 6–3	(Ukraine) Marta Kostyuk	(Belgium) Greet Minnen (United States) Catherine Bellis	(Denmark) Clara Tauson (Poland) Katarzyna Kawa (Spain) Aliona Bolsova (Italy) Sara Errani
October 26	Bellatorum Resources Pro Classic; Tyler, United States; Hard; W80; Singles Draw – Doubles Draw	(United States) Allura Zamarripa (United States) Maribella Zamarripa; 6–3, 5–7, [11–9]	(Poland) Paula Kania-Choduń (Poland) Katarzyna Piter	(Belgium) Greet Minnen (United States) Catherine Bellis	(Denmark) Clara Tauson (Poland) Katarzyna Kawa (Spain) Aliona Bolsova (Italy) Sara Errani
October 26	Istanbul, Turkey; Hard (indoor); W25; Singles and Doubles Draws	(Estonia) Kaia Kanepi; 6–3, 6–3	(Russia) Vera Zvonareva	(Romania) Jaqueline Cristian (United Kingdom) Francesca Jones	(Spain) Andrea Lázaro García (Romania) Elena-Gabriela Ruse (Hungary) Réka Luca Jani (Ukraine) Katarina Zavatska
October 26	Istanbul, Turkey; Hard (indoor); W25; Singles and Doubles Draws	(Romania) Jaqueline Cristian (Romania) Elena-Gabriela Ruse; 6–3, 6–4	(United Kingdom) Maia Lumsden (Turkey) Melis Sezer	(Romania) Jaqueline Cristian (United Kingdom) Francesca Jones	(Spain) Andrea Lázaro García (Romania) Elena-Gabriela Ruse (Hungary) Réka Luca Jani (Ukraine) Katarina Zavatska
October 26	Pazardzhik, Bulgaria; Clay; W15; Singles and Doubles Draws	(Russia) Erika Andreeva; 1–6, 6–0, 6–2	(Slovakia) Sofia Milatová	(Romania) Oana Georgeta Simion (Norway) Malene Helgø	(Italy) Nuria Brancaccio (Belgium) Sofia Costoulas (France) Séléna Janicijevic (Romania) Cristina Dinu
October 26	Pazardzhik, Bulgaria; Clay; W15; Singles and Doubles Draws	(Romania) Oana Gavrilă (Romania) Oana Georgeta Simion; 6–7^{(1–7)}, 6–4, [10–4]	(Bulgaria) Katerina Dimitrova (United States) Isabelle Kouzmanov	(Romania) Oana Georgeta Simion (Norway) Malene Helgø	(Italy) Nuria Brancaccio (Belgium) Sofia Costoulas (France) Séléna Janicijevic (Romania) Cristina Dinu
October 26	Sharm El Sheikh, Egypt; Hard; W15; Singles and Doubles Draws	(India) Rutuja Bhosale; 6–3, 7–5	(Czech Republic) Anna Sisková	(Slovakia) Romana Čisovská (United Kingdom) Emilie Lindh	(South Africa) Chanel Simmonds (Egypt) Lamis Alhussein Abdel Aziz (Ukraine) Anastasiya Poplavska (Chinese Taipei) Joanna Garland
October 26	Sharm El Sheikh, Egypt; Hard; W15; Singles and Doubles Draws	(Russia) Ksenia Laskutova (Russia) Daria Mishina; 5–7, 7–6^{(8–6)}, [10–4]	(Russia) Anastasia Gasanova (Ukraine) Valeriya Strakhova	(Slovakia) Romana Čisovská (United Kingdom) Emilie Lindh	(South Africa) Chanel Simmonds (Egypt) Lamis Alhussein Abdel Aziz (Ukraine) Anastasiya Poplavska (Chinese Taipei) Joanna Garland
October 26	Heraklion, Greece; Clay; W15; Singles and Doubles Draws	(Romania) Alexandra Cadanțu; 4–6, 6–3, 6–3	(Romania) Andreea Roșca	(Germany) Romy Kölzer (Italy) Dalila Spiteri	(Slovenia) Nika Radišić (Romania) Ioana Loredana Roșca (Czech Republic) Monika Kilnarová (Germany) Laura Schaeder
October 26	Heraklion, Greece; Clay; W15; Singles and Doubles Draws	(Romania) Andreea Roșca (Romania) Ioana Loredana Roșca; 6–1, 6–3	(Italy) Melania Delai (Italy) Dalila Spiteri	(Germany) Romy Kölzer (Italy) Dalila Spiteri	(Slovenia) Nika Radišić (Romania) Ioana Loredana Roșca (Czech Republic) Monika Kilnarová (Germany) Laura Schaeder
October 26	Lousada, Portugal; Hard (indoor); W15; Singles and Doubles Draws	(Switzerland) Susan Bandecchi; 7–6^{(8–6)}, 2–6, 6–2	(Netherlands) Arianne Hartono	(Italy) Lucia Bronzetti (Netherlands) Stéphanie Visscher	(Spain) Celia Cerviño Ruiz (Italy) Claudia Giovine (Switzerland) Arlinda Rushiti (Czech Republic) Anastasia Zarycká
October 26	Lousada, Portugal; Hard (indoor); W15; Singles and Doubles Draws	(Switzerland) Susan Bandecchi (Belgium) Lara Salden; 6–4, 6–3	(Italy) Claudia Giovine (Italy) Angelica Moratelli	(Italy) Lucia Bronzetti (Netherlands) Stéphanie Visscher	(Spain) Celia Cerviño Ruiz (Italy) Claudia Giovine (Switzerland) Arlinda Rushiti (Czech Republic) Anastasia Zarycká
October 26	Platja d'Aro, Spain; Clay; W15; Singles and Doubles Draws	(Switzerland) Sebastianna Scilipoti; 6–4, 6–4	(United Kingdom) Amanda Carreras	(Spain) Marta Custic (Spain) Ángela Fita Boluda	(United Kingdom) Emily Appleton (Spain) Jéssica Bouzas Maneiro (Spain) Yvonne Cavallé Reimers (Russia) Alina Charaeva
October 26	Platja d'Aro, Spain; Clay; W15; Singles and Doubles Draws	(Russia) Alina Charaeva (Russia) Oksana Selekhmeteva; 5–7, 6–1, [10–5]	(Spain) Alba Carrillo Marín (Spain) Júlia Payola	(Spain) Marta Custic (Spain) Ángela Fita Boluda	(United Kingdom) Emily Appleton (Spain) Jéssica Bouzas Maneiro (Spain) Yvonne Cavallé Reimers (Russia) Alina Charaeva
October 26	Monastir, Tunisia; Hard; W15; Singles and Doubles Draws	(Argentina) María Lourdes Carlé; 6–4, 6–3	(Poland) Weronika Falkowska	(Germany) Sina Herrmann (Belgium) Eliessa Vanlangendonck	(France) Yasmine Mansouri (Serbia) Tamara Čurović (France) Alice Robbe (Czech Republic) Laetitia Pulchartová
October 26	Monastir, Tunisia; Hard; W15; Singles and Doubles Draws	(Bulgaria) Dia Evtimova (France) Carole Monnet; 6–3, 2–6, [10–5]	(Poland) Weronika Falkowska (Belarus) Anna Kubareva	(Germany) Sina Herrmann (Belgium) Eliessa Vanlangendonck	(France) Yasmine Mansouri (Serbia) Tamara Čurović (France) Alice Robbe (Czech Republic) Laetitia Pulchartová

=== November ===
Week of	Tournament	Winner	Runners-up	Semifinalists	Quarterfinalists
November 2	LTP Charleston Pro Tennis; Charleston, United States; Clay; W100; Singles Draw – Doubles Draw	(Egypt) Mayar Sherif; 6–2, 6–3	(Poland) Katarzyna Kawa	(Japan) Misaki Doi (Mexico) Renata Zarazúa	(Romania) Gabriela Talabă (United States) Ann Li (United States) Claire Liu (United States) Lauren Davis
November 2	LTP Charleston Pro Tennis; Charleston, United States; Clay; W100; Singles Draw – Doubles Draw	(Poland) Magdalena Fręch (Poland) Katarzyna Kawa; 4–6, 6–4, [10–2]	(Australia) Astra Sharma (Egypt) Mayar Sherif	(Japan) Misaki Doi (Mexico) Renata Zarazúa	(Romania) Gabriela Talabă (United States) Ann Li (United States) Claire Liu (United States) Lauren Davis
November 2	Sharm El Sheikh, Egypt; Hard; W15; Singles and Doubles Draws	(Belarus) Iryna Shymanovich; 6–3, 7–5	(United States) Jessie Aney	(Russia) Daria Mishina (Egypt) Sandra Samir	(Switzerland) Valentina Ryser (South Africa) Chanel Simmonds (New Zealand) Paige Hourigan (Croatia) Lea Bošković
November 2	Sharm El Sheikh, Egypt; Hard; W15; Singles and Doubles Draws	(Russia) Ksenia Laskutova (Russia) Daria Mishina; 7–6^{(7–3)}, 6–7^{(2–7)}, [12–10]	(Switzerland) Valentina Ryser (Switzerland) Lulu Sun	(Russia) Daria Mishina (Egypt) Sandra Samir	(Switzerland) Valentina Ryser (South Africa) Chanel Simmonds (New Zealand) Paige Hourigan (Croatia) Lea Bošković
November 2	Heraklion, Greece; Clay; W15; Singles and Doubles Draws	(Bulgaria) Gergana Topalova; 6–4, 6–0	(Germany) Romy Kölzer	(Romania) Andreea Roșca (United States) Elysia Bolton	(Romania) Alexandra Cadanțu (Czech Republic) Johana Marková (Romania) Ioana Loredana Roșca (Greece) Sapfo Sakellaridi
November 2	Heraklion, Greece; Clay; W15; Singles and Doubles Draws	(Slovakia) Alica Rusová (Switzerland) Nina Stadler; 6–0, 6–4	(Czech Republic) Johana Marková (Slovenia) Nika Radišić	(Romania) Andreea Roșca (United States) Elysia Bolton	(Romania) Alexandra Cadanțu (Czech Republic) Johana Marková (Romania) Ioana Loredana Roșca (Greece) Sapfo Sakellaridi
November 2	Ortisei, Italy; Hard (indoor); W15; Singles and Doubles Draws	(Italy) Federica Di Sarra; 6–3, 6–3	(Liechtenstein) Kathinka von Deichmann	(France) Séléna Janicijevic (Italy) Stefania Rubini	(Netherlands) Suzan Lamens (Italy) Bianca Turati (Italy) Lisa Pigato (Finland) Anastasia Kulikova
November 2	Ortisei, Italy; Hard (indoor); W15; Singles and Doubles Draws	(Netherlands) Suzan Lamens (Belgium) Kimberley Zimmermann; 3–6, 6–4, [11–9]	(Italy) Federica Di Sarra (Finland) Anastasia Kulikova	(France) Séléna Janicijevic (Italy) Stefania Rubini	(Netherlands) Suzan Lamens (Italy) Bianca Turati (Italy) Lisa Pigato (Finland) Anastasia Kulikova
November 2	Lousada, Portugal; Hard (indoor); W15; Singles and Doubles Draws	(Belgium) Lara Salden; 6–4, 6–3	(Switzerland) Susan Bandecchi	(Japan) Yuriko Lily Miyazaki (Russia) Alina Charaeva	(Portugal) Maria Inês Fonte (Italy) Lucia Bronzetti (Czech Republic) Anastasia Zarycká (France) Sara Cakarevic
November 2	Lousada, Portugal; Hard (indoor); W15; Singles and Doubles Draws	(Netherlands) Arianne Hartono (Japan) Yuriko Lily Miyazaki; 6–1, 5–7, [10–7]	(India) Riya Bhatia (Portugal) Inês Murta	(Japan) Yuriko Lily Miyazaki (Russia) Alina Charaeva	(Portugal) Maria Inês Fonte (Italy) Lucia Bronzetti (Czech Republic) Anastasia Zarycká (France) Sara Cakarevic
November 2	Castellón, Spain; Hard; W15; Singles and Doubles Draws	Tournament cancelled during the first round due to ongoing poor weather.			
November 9	Orlando, United States; Hard; W25; Singles and Doubles Draws	(United States) Alycia Parks; 3–6, 6–4, 6–2	(United States) Robin Montgomery	(United States) Hanna Chang (United States) Jamie Loeb	(United States) Hurricane Tyra Black (Serbia) Katarina Jokić (United States) Claire Liu (Poland) Katarzyna Kawa
November 9	Orlando, United States; Hard; W25; Singles and Doubles Draws	(United States) Rasheeda McAdoo (United States) Alycia Parks; 4–6, 6–1, [11–9]	(United States) Jamie Loeb (New Zealand) Erin Routliffe	(United States) Hanna Chang (United States) Jamie Loeb	(United States) Hurricane Tyra Black (Serbia) Katarina Jokić (United States) Claire Liu (Poland) Katarzyna Kawa
November 9	Sharm El Sheikh, Egypt; Hard; W15; Singles and Doubles Draws	(Croatia) Lea Bošković; 6–4, 6–4	(Chinese Taipei) Joanna Garland	(Russia) Elina Avanesyan (Egypt) Sandra Samir	(United States) Anastasia Nefedova (India) Rutuja Bhosale (Russia) Polina Kudermetova (Russia) Anna Morgina
November 9	Sharm El Sheikh, Egypt; Hard; W15; Singles and Doubles Draws	(Russia) Elina Avanesyan (Belarus) Iryna Shymanovich; 6–4, 6–1	(Switzerland) Valentina Ryser (Switzerland) Lulu Sun	(Russia) Elina Avanesyan (Egypt) Sandra Samir	(United States) Anastasia Nefedova (India) Rutuja Bhosale (Russia) Polina Kudermetova (Russia) Anna Morgina
November 9	Heraklion, Greece; Clay; W15; Singles and Doubles Draws	(Germany) Romy Kölzer; 6–3, 1–6, 6–2	(Romania) Alexandra Cadanțu	(Czech Republic) Darja Viďmanová (Israel) Nicole Khirin	(Romania) Andreea Roșca (Georgia (country)) Sofia Shapatava (Ukraine) Ganna Poznikhirenko (Italy) Martina Spigarelli
November 9	Heraklion, Greece; Clay; W15; Singles and Doubles Draws	(Italy) Verena Meliss (Italy) Martina Spigarelli; 7–5, 6–2	(Israel) Shavit Kimchi (Israel) Maya Tahan	(Czech Republic) Darja Viďmanová (Israel) Nicole Khirin	(Romania) Andreea Roșca (Georgia (country)) Sofia Shapatava (Ukraine) Ganna Poznikhirenko (Italy) Martina Spigarelli
November 16	Las Palmas, Spain; Clay; W25; Singles and Doubles Draws	(Estonia) Kaia Kanepi; 6–3, 6–2	(Egypt) Mayar Sherif	(Netherlands) Richèl Hogenkamp (Germany) Jule Niemeier	(Czech Republic) Anastasia Zarycká (Russia) Oksana Selekhmeteva (Hungary) Réka Luca Jani (Belgium) Lara Salden
November 16	Las Palmas, Spain; Clay; W25; Singles and Doubles Draws	(Belgium) Lara Salden (Belgium) Kimberley Zimmermann; 6–1, 6–3	(Netherlands) Suzan Lamens (Netherlands) Eva Vedder	(Netherlands) Richèl Hogenkamp (Germany) Jule Niemeier	(Czech Republic) Anastasia Zarycká (Russia) Oksana Selekhmeteva (Hungary) Réka Luca Jani (Belgium) Lara Salden
November 16	Sharm El Sheikh, Egypt; Hard; W15; Singles and Doubles Draws	(Chinese Taipei) Joanna Garland; 7–5, 6–3	(Switzerland) Lulu Sun	(Argentina) Jazmín Ortenzi (Russia) Daria Mishina	(United Kingdom) Jasmine Conway (France) Giulia Morlet (Belarus) Iryna Shymanovich (Russia) Polina Bakhmutkina
November 16	Sharm El Sheikh, Egypt; Hard; W15; Singles and Doubles Draws	(Czech Republic) Michaela Bayerlová (Czech Republic) Laetitia Pulchartová; 6–4, 7–5	(Russia) Elina Avanesyan (Belarus) Iryna Shymanovich	(Argentina) Jazmín Ortenzi (Russia) Daria Mishina	(United Kingdom) Jasmine Conway (France) Giulia Morlet (Belarus) Iryna Shymanovich (Russia) Polina Bakhmutkina
November 16	Haabneeme, Estonia; Hard (indoor); W15; Singles and Doubles Draws	(Latvia) Kamilla Bartone; 6–3, 6–4	(Netherlands) Stéphanie Visscher	(Russia) Ekaterina Makarova (Latvia) Daniela Vismane	(Norway) Ulrikke Eikeri (Estonia) Elena Malõgina (United Kingdom) Emily Appleton (Poland) Weronika Baszak
November 16	Haabneeme, Estonia; Hard (indoor); W15; Singles and Doubles Draws	(Lithuania) Justina Mikulskytė (Netherlands) Lexie Stevens; 6–2, 6–1	(United Kingdom) Emily Appleton (Poland) Martyna Kubka	(Russia) Ekaterina Makarova (Latvia) Daniela Vismane	(Norway) Ulrikke Eikeri (Estonia) Elena Malõgina (United Kingdom) Emily Appleton (Poland) Weronika Baszak
November 16	Heraklion, Greece; Clay; W15; Singles and Doubles Draws	(Romania) Andreea Roșca; 6–0, 6–1	(Italy) Martina Colmegna	(Armenia) Ani Amiraghyan (Romania) Ioana Loredana Roșca	(Germany) Romy Kölzer (France) Séléna Janicijevic (Greece) Michaela Laki (Israel) Nicole Khirin
November 16	Heraklion, Greece; Clay; W15; Singles and Doubles Draws	(Romania) Andreea Roșca (Romania) Ioana Loredana Roșca; 6–4, 6–4	(Italy) Martina Colmegna (Italy) Melania Delai	(Armenia) Ani Amiraghyan (Romania) Ioana Loredana Roșca	(Germany) Romy Kölzer (France) Séléna Janicijevic (Greece) Michaela Laki (Israel) Nicole Khirin
November 23	Cairo, Egypt; Clay; W15; Singles and Doubles Draws	(Brazil) Carolina Alves; 7–5, 6–4	(Russia) Daria Mishina	(United States) Jessie Aney (Netherlands) Lexie Stevens	(Russia) Erika Andreeva (Russia) Ksenia Laskutova (Slovakia) Barbora Matúšová (Kazakhstan) Zhibek Kulambayeva
November 23	Cairo, Egypt; Clay; W15; Singles and Doubles Draws	(Russia) Elina Avanesyan (Belarus) Anna Kubareva; 6–3, 7–5	(United States) Anastasia Nefedova (Argentina) Jazmín Ortenzi	(United States) Jessie Aney (Netherlands) Lexie Stevens	(Russia) Erika Andreeva (Russia) Ksenia Laskutova (Slovakia) Barbora Matúšová (Kazakhstan) Zhibek Kulambayeva
November 23	Heraklion, Greece; Clay; W15; Singles and Doubles Draws	(Romania) Andreea Roșca; 6–1, 6–2	(Czech Republic) Darja Viďmanová	(Italy) Verena Meliss (Japan) Ayumi Koshiishi	(Romania) Georgia Crăciun (Germany) Silvia Ambrosio (Greece) Sapfo Sakellaridi (Romania) Ioana Loredana Roșca
November 23	Heraklion, Greece; Clay; W15; Singles and Doubles Draws	(Romania) Andreea Roșca (Romania) Ioana Loredana Roșca; 6–3, 6–3	(Russia) Elina Nepliy (Greece) Dimitra Pavlou	(Italy) Verena Meliss (Japan) Ayumi Koshiishi	(Romania) Georgia Crăciun (Germany) Silvia Ambrosio (Greece) Sapfo Sakellaridi (Romania) Ioana Loredana Roșca
November 23	Las Palmas, Spain; Clay; W15; Singles and Doubles Draws	(Belgium) Maryna Zanevska vs. (Spain) Andrea Lázaro García; The final was abandoned due to poor weather with Lázaro García leading 7–5, 6–5. Both players agreed to split ranking points and prize money.		(Czech Republic) Anastasia Zarycká (Germany) Katharina Gerlach	(Netherlands) Suzan Lamens (France) Diane Parry (Spain) Marta Custic (Russia) Oksana Selekhmeteva
November 23	Las Palmas, Spain; Clay; W15; Singles and Doubles Draws	(Venezuela) Andrea Gámiz (Argentina) Guillermina Naya; 3–6, 7–5, [10–7]	(Chile) Bárbara Gatica (Brazil) Rebeca Pereira	(Czech Republic) Anastasia Zarycká (Germany) Katharina Gerlach	(Netherlands) Suzan Lamens (France) Diane Parry (Spain) Marta Custic (Russia) Oksana Selekhmeteva
November 23	Monastir, Tunisia; Hard; W15; Singles and Doubles Draws	(France) Carole Monnet; 2–6, 6–1, 7–5	(Belarus) Yuliya Hatouka	(France) Manon Arcangioli (France) Aubane Droguet	(Belarus) Shalimar Talbi (Algeria) Inès Ibbou (Bulgaria) Dia Evtimova (Bosnia and Herzegovina) Nefisa Berberović
November 23	Monastir, Tunisia; Hard; W15; Singles and Doubles Draws	(France) Aubane Droguet (Belarus) Shalimar Talbi; 7–5, 6–1	(Italy) Chiara Catini (France) Astrid Cirotte	(France) Manon Arcangioli (France) Aubane Droguet	(Belarus) Shalimar Talbi (Algeria) Inès Ibbou (Bulgaria) Dia Evtimova (Bosnia and Herzegovina) Nefisa Berberović
November 30	Cairo, Egypt; Clay; W15; Singles and Doubles Draws	(Russia) Erika Andreeva; 6–1, 6–3	(Brazil) Carolina Alves	(Kazakhstan) Zhibek Kulambayeva (United States) Anastasia Nefedova	(Russia) Elina Avanesyan (Czech Republic) Anna Sisková (Belarus) Anna Kubareva (Portugal) Inês Murta
November 30	Cairo, Egypt; Clay; W15; Singles and Doubles Draws	(Czech Republic) Anna Sisková (Netherlands) Lexie Stevens; 3–6, 6–4, [10–8]	(Russia) Elina Avanesyan (Belarus) Anna Kubareva	(Kazakhstan) Zhibek Kulambayeva (United States) Anastasia Nefedova	(Russia) Elina Avanesyan (Czech Republic) Anna Sisková (Belarus) Anna Kubareva (Portugal) Inês Murta
November 30	Monastir, Tunisia; Hard; W15; Singles and Doubles Draws	(Belarus) Yuliya Hatouka; 6–1, 5–7, 6–3	(Czech Republic) Linda Fruhvirtová	(France) Carole Monnet (Burundi) Sada Nahimana	(Belarus) Shalimar Talbi (Bosnia and Herzegovina) Nefisa Berberović (Spain) Yvonne Cavallé Reimers (Switzerland) Sebastianna Scilipoti
November 30	Monastir, Tunisia; Hard; W15; Singles and Doubles Draws	(Spain) Yvonne Cavallé Reimers (Serbia) Bojana Marinković; 6–1, 6–4	(Bosnia and Herzegovina) Nefisa Berberović (Bosnia and Herzegovina) Anita Husarić	(France) Carole Monnet (Burundi) Sada Nahimana	(Belarus) Shalimar Talbi (Bosnia and Herzegovina) Nefisa Berberović (Spain) Yvonne Cavallé Reimers (Switzerland) Sebastianna Scilipoti
November 30	Antalya, Turkey; Clay; W15; Singles and Doubles Draws	(Turkey) İpek Öz; 6–1, 6–1	(Romania) Andreea Roșca	(United States) Hurricane Tyra Black (Russia) Polina Kudermetova	(Russia) Julia Avdeeva (Croatia) Adriana Rajković (Slovenia) Manca Pislak (Ukraine) Daria Lopatetska
November 30	Antalya, Turkey; Clay; W15; Singles and Doubles Draws	(Romania) Andreea Prisăcariu (Romania) Andreea Roșca; 3–6, 6–4, [10–6]	(Ukraine) Viktoriia Dema (Romania) Cristina Dinu	(United States) Hurricane Tyra Black (Russia) Polina Kudermetova	(Russia) Julia Avdeeva (Croatia) Adriana Rajković (Slovenia) Manca Pislak (Ukraine) Daria Lopatetska

=== December ===
Week of	Tournament	Winner	Runners-up	Semifinalists	Quarterfinalists
December 7
December 7	Al Habtoor Tennis Challenge; Dubai, United Arab Emirates; Hard; W100+H; Singles Draw – Doubles Draw	(Romania) Sorana Cîrstea; 4–6, 6–3, 6–3	(Czech Republic) Kateřina Siniaková	(Romania) Elena-Gabriela Ruse (Slovenia) Polona Hercog	(Montenegro) Danka Kovinić (United Kingdom) Heather Watson (Czech Republic) Barbora Krejčíková (Netherlands) Arantxa Rus
December 7	Al Habtoor Tennis Challenge; Dubai, United Arab Emirates; Hard; W100+H; Singles Draw – Doubles Draw	(Georgia (country)) Ekaterine Gorgodze (India) Ankita Raina; 6–4, 3–6, [10–6]	(Spain) Aliona Bolsova (Slovenia) Kaja Juvan	(Romania) Elena-Gabriela Ruse (Slovenia) Polona Hercog	(Montenegro) Danka Kovinić (United Kingdom) Heather Watson (Czech Republic) Barbora Krejčíková (Netherlands) Arantxa Rus
December 7	Cairo, Egypt; Clay; W15; Singles and Doubles Draws	(Brazil) Carolina Alves; 6–0, 7–5	(Russia) Elina Avanesyan	(Russia) Daria Mishina (Czech Republic) Anna Sisková	(Slovenia) Živa Falkner (Netherlands) Lexie Stevens (Hungary) Vanda Lukács (Portugal) Inês Murta
December 7	Cairo, Egypt; Clay; W15; Singles and Doubles Draws	(Russia) Daria Mishina (Russia) Noel Saidenova; 6–2, 2–6, [11–9]	(Russia) Elina Avanesyan (Russia) Anastasia Tikhonova	(Russia) Daria Mishina (Czech Republic) Anna Sisková	(Slovenia) Živa Falkner (Netherlands) Lexie Stevens (Hungary) Vanda Lukács (Portugal) Inês Murta
December 7	Madrid, Spain; Clay (indoor); W15; Singles and Doubles Draws	(Switzerland) Conny Perrin; 6–4, 7–6^{(10–8)}	(Spain) Jéssica Bouzas Maneiro	(Italy) Martina Spigarelli (Spain) Olga Sáez Larra	(Spain) Lucía Cortez Llorca (Spain) Ángela Fita Boluda (Spain) Alba Carrillo Marín (Spain) Ane Mintegi del Olmo
December 7	Madrid, Spain; Clay (indoor); W15; Singles and Doubles Draws	(Spain) Ángela Fita Boluda (Russia) Oksana Selekhmeteva; 7–6^{(7–4)}, 1–6, [10–5]	(Chile) Bárbara Gatica (Brazil) Rebeca Pereira	(Italy) Martina Spigarelli (Spain) Olga Sáez Larra	(Spain) Lucía Cortez Llorca (Spain) Ángela Fita Boluda (Spain) Alba Carrillo Marín (Spain) Ane Mintegi del Olmo
December 7	Monastir, Tunisia; Hard; W15; Singles and Doubles Draws	(Switzerland) Lulu Sun; 6–0, 2–6, 6–2	(France) Carole Monnet	(Bosnia and Herzegovina) Nefisa Berberović (Burundi) Sada Nahimana	(Russia) Anna Ukolova (Spain) Yvonne Cavallé Reimers (Poland) Weronika Falkowska (Switzerland) Sebastianna Scilipoti
December 7	Monastir, Tunisia; Hard; W15; Singles and Doubles Draws	(Bosnia and Herzegovina) Nefisa Berberović (Bosnia and Herzegovina) Anita Husarić; 6–4, 6–4	(Spain) Celia Cerviño Ruiz (Denmark) Olivia Gram	(Bosnia and Herzegovina) Nefisa Berberović (Burundi) Sada Nahimana	(Russia) Anna Ukolova (Spain) Yvonne Cavallé Reimers (Poland) Weronika Falkowska (Switzerland) Sebastianna Scilipoti
December 7	Antalya, Turkey; Clay; W15; Singles and Doubles Draws	(Russia) Polina Kudermetova vs (Romania) Andreea Roșca; The final was abandoned due to poor weather. Both players split ranking points and prize money.		(Russia) Erika Andreeva (Turkey) Zeynep Sönmez	(Romania) Cristina Dinu (Croatia) Tara Würth (Romania) Simona Ogescu (North Macedonia) Lina Gjorcheska
December 7	Antalya, Turkey; Clay; W15; Singles and Doubles Draws	(United States) Hurricane Tyra Black (Switzerland) Svenja Ochsner; 7–6^{(7–2)}, 7–5	(Bulgaria) Gergana Topalova (Latvia) Daniela Vismane	(Russia) Erika Andreeva (Turkey) Zeynep Sönmez	(Romania) Cristina Dinu (Croatia) Tara Würth (Romania) Simona Ogescu (North Macedonia) Lina Gjorcheska
December 14	Selva Gardena, Italy; Hard (indoor); W25; Singles and Doubles Draws	(China) Zheng Qinwen; 6–7^{(0–7)}, 6–0, 6–3	(Croatia) Lea Bošković	(Croatia) Ana Konjuh (Switzerland) Susan Bandecchi	(Ukraine) Marta Kostyuk (Italy) Dalila Spiteri (Croatia) Tena Lukas (Italy) Federica Di Sarra
December 14	Selva Gardena, Italy; Hard (indoor); W25; Singles and Doubles Draws	(Italy) Matilde Paoletti (Italy) Lisa Pigato; 7–5, 6–1	(Poland) Maja Chwalińska (Czech Republic) Linda Fruhvirtová	(Croatia) Ana Konjuh (Switzerland) Susan Bandecchi	(Ukraine) Marta Kostyuk (Italy) Dalila Spiteri (Croatia) Tena Lukas (Italy) Federica Di Sarra
December 14	Monastir, Tunisia; Hard; W15; Singles and Doubles Draws	(France) Carole Monnet; 5–7, 7–5, 6–3	(Belarus) Yuliya Hatouka	(Poland) Weronika Falkowska (Russia) Maria Bondarenko	(Switzerland) Lulu Sun (Burundi) Sada Nahimana (Croatia) Antonia Ružić (Poland) Martyna Kubka
December 14	Monastir, Tunisia; Hard; W15; Singles and Doubles Draws	(Poland) Weronika Falkowska (Belarus) Yuliya Hatouka; 6–4, 7–5	(Spain) Yvonne Cavallé Reimers (Spain) Celia Cerviño Ruiz	(Poland) Weronika Falkowska (Russia) Maria Bondarenko	(Switzerland) Lulu Sun (Burundi) Sada Nahimana (Croatia) Antonia Ružić (Poland) Martyna Kubka
December 14	Antalya, Turkey; Clay; W15; Singles and Doubles Draws	(France) Diane Parry; 6–3, 6–1	(Turkey) Berfu Cengiz	(Romania) Cristina Dinu (Turkey) Zeynep Sönmez	(Ukraine) Valeriya Strakhova (Ukraine) Daria Lopatetska (Romania) Georgia Crăciun (Japan) Nagi Hanatani
December 14	Antalya, Turkey; Clay; W15; Singles and Doubles Draws	(Georgia (country)) Sofia Shapatava (Ukraine) Valeriya Strakhova; 6–4, 6–4	(Germany) Julia Kimmelmann (Turkey) İlay Yörük	(Romania) Cristina Dinu (Turkey) Zeynep Sönmez	(Ukraine) Valeriya Strakhova (Ukraine) Daria Lopatetska (Romania) Georgia Crăciun (Japan) Nagi Hanatani
December 21	Monastir, Tunisia; Hard; W15; Singles and Doubles Draws	(Spain) Nuria Párrizas Díaz; 6–3, 6–0	(France) Aubane Droguet	(Bosnia and Herzegovina) Anita Husarić (Poland) Martyna Kubka	(Poland) Weronika Falkowska (Algeria) Inès Ibbou (Switzerland) Fiona Ganz (Czech Republic) Anna Sisková
December 21	Monastir, Tunisia; Hard; W15; Singles and Doubles Draws	(Poland) Weronika Falkowska (Czech Republic) Anna Sisková; 6–2, 6–2	(France) Aubane Droguet (France) Helena Stevic	(Bosnia and Herzegovina) Anita Husarić (Poland) Martyna Kubka	(Poland) Weronika Falkowska (Algeria) Inès Ibbou (Switzerland) Fiona Ganz (Czech Republic) Anna Sisková
December 21	Antalya, Turkey; Clay; W15; Singles and Doubles Draws	(Russia) Amina Anshba; 6–2, 7–5	(Russia) Julia Avdeeva	(Lithuania) Justina Mikulskytė (Turkey) Ayla Aksu	(Turkey) İpek Öz (Romania) Simona Ogescu (Romania) Andreea Prisăcariu (Russia) Anzhelika Isaeva
December 21	Antalya, Turkey; Clay; W15; Singles and Doubles Draws	(Italy) Nicole Fossa Huergo (Germany) Julia Kimmelmann; 6–3, 6–3	(Ukraine) Anastasiya Poplavska (Russia) Arina Solomatina	(Lithuania) Justina Mikulskytė (Turkey) Ayla Aksu	(Turkey) İpek Öz (Romania) Simona Ogescu (Romania) Andreea Prisăcariu (Russia) Anzhelika Isaeva
December 28	Monastir, Tunisia; Hard; W15; Singles and Doubles Draws	(Czech Republic) Anna Sisková; 0–6, 6–4, 7–6^{(7–3)}	(Belgium) Amelie Van Impe	(Estonia) Helena Narmont (Tunisia) Chiraz Bechri	(India) Vaidehi Chaudhari (Bosnia and Herzegovina) Anita Husarić (Switzerland) Fiona Ganz (Italy) Arianna Zucchini
December 28	Monastir, Tunisia; Hard; W15; Singles and Doubles Draws	(Algeria) Inès Ibbou (Czech Republic) Anna Sisková; 6–3, 6–1	(Switzerland) Fiona Ganz (Serbia) Elena Gemović	(Estonia) Helena Narmont (Tunisia) Chiraz Bechri	(India) Vaidehi Chaudhari (Bosnia and Herzegovina) Anita Husarić (Switzerland) Fiona Ganz (Italy) Arianna Zucchini
