= 2023 Dallas Summer Series – Doubles =

Doubles
- 2023 Dallas Summer Series

Final
- Champions: (United States) Sophie Chang (United States) Ashley Lahey
- Runners-up: (United States) Makenna Jones (United States) Jamie Loeb
- Score: 6–2, 6–2

Events
Singles	Doubles
← 2022 ·	Dallas Summer Series	· 2024 →

Maria Kozyreva and Veronika Miroshnichenko were the defending champions but Kozyreva chose not to participate. Miroshnichenko partnered alongside Maria Kononova, but lost in the quarterfinals to Sophie Chang and Ashley Lahey.

Chang and Lahey won the title, defeating Makenna Jones and Jamie Loeb in the final, 6–2, 6–2.

== Seeds ==
1. (United States) Makenna Jones / (United States) Jamie Loeb (final)
2. (United States) Sophie Chang / (United States) Ashley Lahey (champions)
3. (United States) Dalayna Hewitt / (United States) Christina Rosca (semifinals)
4. (United States) Maribella Zamarripa / (Mexico) Renata Zarazúa (first round)

== Draw ==
=== Key ===
- Q = Qualifier
- WC = Wild card
- LL = Lucky loser
- Alt = Alternate
- SE = Special exempt
- PR = Protected ranking
- ITF = ITF entry
- JE = Junior exempt
- w/o = Walkover
- r = Retired
- d = Defaulted
- SR = Special ranking

First round
1	(United States) M Jones (United States) J Loeb	3	6	[10]
(Bosnia and Herzegovina) N Berberović (Ukraine) G Poznikhirenko	6	3	[7]
WC	(United States) N Block (United States) I Chhiv	3	1
WC	(United States) J Bernales (United States) P Charney	6	6
4	(United States) M Zamarripa (Mexico) R Zarazúa	1	1
(United States) H Baptiste (United States) W Osuigwe	6	6
(United States) R Anderson (India) S Yamalapalli	3	3
(United States) M Brengle (United States) S Crawford	6	6
(China) Y Ma (China) Y Wang	7	6^{6}	[3]
(United States) E Cayetano (United States) M Sieg	5	7^{8}	[10]
(United States) H Inoue (United States) A Smith	4	4
3	(United States) D Hewitt (United States) C Rosca	6	6
M Kononova; V Miroshnichenko	1	6	[10]
(United States) M Kessler (Ukraine) Y Starodubtseva	6	3	[8]
WC	(United States) C Beck (United States) R Brantmeier	3	2
2	(United States) S Chang (United States) A Lahey	6	6

Quarterfinals
1	(United States) M Jones (United States) J Loeb	6	7
WC	(United States) J Bernales (United States) P Charney	2	5
(United States) H Baptiste (United States) W Osuigwe	7	6
(United States) M Brengle (United States) S Crawford	5	1
(United States) E Cayetano (United States) M Sieg	4	2
3	(United States) D Hewitt (United States) C Rosca	6	6
M Kononova; V Miroshnichenko	3	6	[7]
2	(United States) S Chang (United States) A Lahey	6	3	[10]

Semifinals
1	(United States) M Jones (United States) J Loeb	6	6
(United States) H Baptiste (United States) W Osuigwe	2	1
3	(United States) D Hewitt (United States) C Rosca	2	3
2	(United States) S Chang (United States) A Lahey	6	6

Final
1	(United States) M Jones (United States) J Loeb	2	2
2	(United States) S Chang (United States) A Lahey	6	6
