= 2022 Christus Health Pro Challenge – Doubles =

Doubles
- 2022 Christus Health Pro Challenge

Final
- Champions: Maria Kozyreva (United States) Ashley Lahey
- Runners-up: (United States) Jaeda Daniel (United Kingdom) Nell Miller
- Score: 7–5, 6–2

Events
Singles	Doubles
← 2021 ·	Tyler Pro Challenge	· 2023 →

Giuliana Olmos and Marcela Zacarías were the defending champions but Olmos chose not to participate. Zacarías partnered alongside Madison Brengle, but the pair withdrew ahead of their quarterfinal match against Abigail Rencheli and Alana Smith.

Maria Kozyreva and Ashley Lahey won the title, defeating Jaeda Daniel and Nell Miller in the final, 7–5, 6–2.

== Seeds ==
1. (Australia) Ellen Perez / (Australia) Storm Sanders (semifinals, withdrew)
2. (United States) Sophie Chang / (United States) Angela Kulikov (quarterfinals, withdrew)
3. (Brazil) Carolina Alves / (Romania) Gabriela Lee (first round)
4. (United States) Madison Brengle / (Mexico) Marcela Zacarías (quarterfinals, withdrew)

== Draw ==
=== Key ===
- Q = Qualifier
- WC = Wild card
- LL = Lucky loser
- Alt = Alternate
- SE = Special exempt
- PR = Protected ranking
- ITF = ITF entry
- JE = Junior exempt
- w/o = Walkover
- r = Retired
- d = Defaulted
- SR = Special ranking

=== Draw ===
First round
1	(Australia) E Perez (Australia) S Sanders	6	6
(Romania) E-T Cadar (Bulgaria) D Evtimova	0	1
(United States) M Mateas (Australia) A Osborne	6	6
(United States) A Zamarripa (United States) M Zamarripa	4	4
3	(Brazil) C Alves (Romania) G Lee	4	6	[8]
WC	(United States) J Daniel (United Kingdom) N Miller	6	3	[10]
WC	(United States) J Jackson (United States) R Newborn	1	1
WC	(United States) J Goldsmith; T Makarova	6	6
(United States) H Chang (United States) A Glatch	5	3
(United States) A Rencheli (United States) A Smith	7	6
(France) T Fiquet (Mexico) AS Sánchez	4	6^{1}
4	(United States) M Brengle (Mexico) M Zacarías	6	7^{7}
M Kozyreva (United States) A Lahey	6	5	[10]
(Chinese Taipei) C-y Hsu; M Kononova	3	7	[8]
(Argentina) ML Carlé (Argentina) M Krywoj	6^{5}	4
2	(United States) S Chang (United States) A Kulikov	7^{7}	6

Quarterfinals
1	(Australia) E Perez (Australia) S Sanders	6	6
(United States) M Mateas (Australia) A Osborne	0	0
WC	(United States) J Daniel (United Kingdom) N Miller	6	3	[10]
WC	(United States) J Goldsmith; T Makarova	3	6	[7]
(United States) A Rencheli (United States) A Smith	w/o
4	(United States) M Brengle (Mexico) M Zacarías
M Kozyreva (United States) A Lahey	w/o
2	(United States) S Chang (United States) A Kulikov

Semifinals
1	(Australia) E Perez (Australia) S Sanders
WC	(United States) J Daniel (United Kingdom) N Miller	w/o
(United States) A Rencheli (United States) A Smith	6	4	[4]
M Kozyreva (United States) A Lahey	3	6	[10]

Final
WC	(United States) J Daniel (United Kingdom) N Miller	5	2
M Kozyreva (United States) A Lahey	7	6
