= 2022 Christus Health Pro Challenge – Singles =

Singles
- 2022 Christus Health Pro Challenge

Final
- Champion: (United States) Taylor Townsend
- Runner-up: (China) Yuan Yue
- Score: 6–4, 6–2

Events
Singles	Doubles
← 2021 ·	Tyler Pro Challenge	· 2023 →

Misaki Doi was the defending champion but chose to compete at the 2022 Torneig Internacional Els Gorchs instead.

Taylor Townsend won the title, defeating Yuan Yue in the final, 6–4, 6–2.

== Seeds ==
1. (Estonia) Kaia Kanepi (first round)
2. (United States) Madison Brengle (first round)
3. (Hungary) Panna Udvardy (second round)
4. (China) Yuan Yue (final)
5. (United States) Katie Volynets (second round)
6. (Romania) Gabriela Lee (first round)
7. (Mexico) Marcela Zacarías (first round)
8. (Argentina) María Lourdes Carlé (quarterfinals)

== Draw ==
=== Key ===
- Q = Qualifier
- WC = Wild card
- LL = Lucky loser
- Alt = Alternate
- SE = Special exempt
- PR = Protected ranking
- ITF = ITF entry
- JE = Junior exempt
- w/o = Walkover
- r = Retired
- d = Defaulted
- SR = Special ranking

=== Finals ===
Semifinals
(United States) Taylor Townsend	7	6
(Australia) Storm Sanders	5	2
4	(China) Yuan Yue	4	6	7^{8}
WC	(United States) Sofia Kenin	6	3	6^{6}

Final
(United States) Taylor Townsend	6	6
4	(China) Yuan Yue	4	2

=== Top half ===
First round
1	(Estonia) K Kanepi	3	4
(United States) T Townsend	6	6
WC	(United States) M Mateas	7	6
Q	(Serbia) K Kozarov	5	0
Q	M Kozyreva	1	4
(Argentina) N Podoroska	6	6
(United States) S Chang	1	0^{r}
5	(United States) K Volynets	6	3
3	(Hungary) P Udvardy	7	7^{7}
(Brazil) C Alves	5	6^{3}
(United States) H Chang	1	2
(Australia) S Sanders	6	6
Q	(United States) A Rencheli	3	4
Q	(United States) A Zamarripa	6	6
(United States) D Lao	1	6	7
7	(Mexico) M Zacarías	6	4	5

Second round
(United States) T Townsend	6	6
WC	(United States) M Mateas	3	4
(Argentina) N Podoroska	6	7^{7}
5	(United States) K Volynets	4	6^{5}
3	(Hungary) P Udvardy	0	2
(Australia) S Sanders	6	6
Q	(United States) A Zamarripa	6^{5}	4
(United States) D Lao	7^{7}	6

Quarterfinals
(United States) T Townsend	7	6
(Argentina) N Podoroska	5	1
(Australia) S Sanders	6	6^{4}	6
(United States) D Lao	1	7^{7}	4

Semifinals
(United States) T Townsend	7	6
(Australia) S Sanders	5	2

=== Bottom half ===
First round
8	(Argentina) ML Carlé	0	6	7
(United States) C Dolehide	6	2	5
(Mexico) AS Sánchez	6^{5}	7	3
WC	(United States) A Smith	7^{7}	5	6
WC	(United States) H Inoue	6	6
Q	(Germany) A Vecic	3	4
(United States) K Day	4	6	2
4	(China) Y Yuan	6	3	6
6	(Romania) G Lee	6^{6}	5
Q	(Australia) E Perez	7^{8}	7
Q	(United States) M Rapolu	5	3
WC	(United States) S Kenin	7	6
PR	(Colombia) E Arango	6	6
(United States) P Stearns	4	2
Q	(United States) A Blokhina	3	6	6
2	(United States) M Brengle	6	4	4

Second round
8	(Argentina) ML Carlé	6	6
WC	(United States) A Smith	4	4
WC	(United States) H Inoue	6	4	2
4	(China) Y Yuan	2	6	6
Q	(Australia) E Perez	4	4
WC	(United States) S Kenin	6	6
PR	(Colombia) E Arango	6	6^{4}	0^{r}
Q	(United States) A Blokhina	4	7^{7}	0

Quarterfinals
8	(Argentina) ML Carlé	6^{4}	0
4	(China) Y Yuan	7^{7}	6
WC	(United States) S Kenin	6	6
Q	(United States) A Blokhina	1	4

Semifinals
4	(China) Y Yuan	4	6	7^{8}
WC	(United States) S Kenin	6	3	6^{6}
