= 2021 Christus Health Pro Challenge – Doubles =

Doubles
- 2021 Christus Health Pro Challenge

Final
- Champions: (Mexico) Giuliana Olmos (Mexico) Marcela Zacarías
- Runners-up: (Japan) Misaki Doi (Poland) Katarzyna Kawa
- Score: 7–5, 1–6, [10–5]

Events
Singles	Doubles
← 2020 ·	Tyler Pro Challenge	· 2022 →

Allura Zamarripa and Maribella Zamarripa were the defending champions but chose not to participate.

Giuliana Olmos and Marcela Zacarías won the title, defeating Misaki Doi and Katarzyna Kawa in the final, 7–5, 1–6, [10–5].

== Seeds ==
1. (Japan) Misaki Doi / (Poland) Katarzyna Kawa (final)
2. (Mexico) Giuliana Olmos / (Mexico) Marcela Zacarías (champions)
3. (Indonesia) Jessy Rompies / (Indonesia) Aldila Sutjiadi (semifinals)
4. (United States) Ashlyn Krueger / (United States) Caty McNally (semifinals)

== Draw ==
=== Key ===
- Q = Qualifier
- WC = Wild card
- LL = Lucky loser
- Alt = Alternate
- SE = Special exempt
- PR = Protected ranking
- ITF = ITF entry
- JE = Junior exempt
- w/o = Walkover
- r = Retired
- d = Defaulted
- SR = Special ranking

=== Draw ===
First round
1	(Japan) M Doi (Poland) K Kawa	6	6
(Indonesia) B Gumulya (Thailand) P Plipuech	3	2
(South Korea) J-h Choi (South Korea) N-l Han	7	2	[10]
(United Kingdom) H Dart (Switzerland) C Perrin	5	6	[8]
4	(United States) A Krueger (United States) C McNally	5	6	[10]
(Japan) J Namigata (Chinese Taipei) F-h Wu	7	0	[8]
(United States) F Di Lorenzo (Japan) K Nara	4	6	[10]
(Poland) A Hertel (Australia) O Tjandramulia	6	4	[7]
WC	(Japan) A Miyamoto (Italy) M Zerulo	3	0
WC	(United States) R Brantmeier (United States) E Kalieva	6	6
(United States) S Chang (United States) A Kulikov	6	2	[10]
3	(Indonesia) J Rompies (Indonesia) A Sutjiadi	2	6	[12]
(United States) A Glatch (United States) Q Gleason	6	7
(United States) H Baptiste (United States) W Osuigwe	4	5
WC	(United States) E Douglas (United States) E Mandlik	3	0
2	(Mexico) G Olmos (Mexico) M Zacarías	6	6

Quarterfinals
1	(Japan) M Doi (Poland) K Kawa	6	6
(South Korea) J-h Choi (South Korea) N-l Han	3	2
4	(United States) A Krueger (United States) C McNally	6	6
(United States) F Di Lorenzo (Japan) K Nara	4	2
WC	(United States) R Brantmeier (United States) E Kalieva	4	7^{8}	[2]
3	(Indonesia) J Rompies (Indonesia) A Sutjiadi	6	6^{6}	[10]
(United States) A Glatch (United States) Q Gleason	6	3	[6]
2	(Mexico) G Olmos (Mexico) M Zacarías	2	6	[10]

Semifinals
1	(Japan) M Doi (Poland) K Kawa	6	6
4	(United States) A Krueger (United States) C McNally	4	4
3	(Indonesia) J Rompies (Indonesia) A Sutjiadi	3	3
2	(Mexico) G Olmos (Mexico) M Zacarías	6	6

Final
1	(Japan) M Doi (Poland) K Kawa	5	6	[5]
2	(Mexico) G Olmos (Mexico) M Zacarías	7	1	[10]
