= 2021 Christus Health Pro Challenge =

Tennis tournament

- Date: 25–31 October 2021
- Edition: 5th
- Category: ITF Women's World Tennis Tour
- Prize money: $80,000
- Surface: Hard
- Location: Tyler, Texas, United States

Champions

Singles
- (Japan) Misaki Doi

Doubles
- (Mexico) Giuliana Olmos / (Mexico) Marcela Zacarías
← 2020 ·	Tyler Pro Challenge	· 2022 →

The 2021 Christus Health Pro Challenge was a professional women's tennis tournament played on outdoor hard courts. It was the fifth edition of the tournament which was part of the 2021 ITF Women's World Tennis Tour. It took place in Tyler, Texas, United States between 25 and 31 October 2021.

== Singles main-draw entrants ==
=== Seeds ===
Country	Player	Rank^{1}	Seed
USA	Madison Brengle	78	1
USA	Claire Liu	88	2
BRA	Beatriz Haddad Maia	94	3
JPN	Misaki Doi	106	4
GBR	Harriet Dart	134	5
CHN	Wang Xiyu	140	6
USA	Caty McNally	141	7
POL	Katarzyna Kawa	159	8

- ^{1} Rankings are as of 18 October 2021.

=== Other entrants ===
The following players received wildcards into the singles main draw:

- (United States) Reese Brantmeier
- (Russia) Maria Kononova
- (United States) Maria Mateas
- (United States) Alana Smith

The following player received entry using a protected ranking:

- (South Korea) Han Na-lae

The following players received entry from the qualifying draw:

- (United States) Sophie Chang
- (United States) Ellie Douglas
- (Serbia) Katarina Kozarov
- (United States) Ashlyn Krueger
- (United States) Elizabeth Mandlik
- (United States) Whitney Osuigwe
- (Indonesia) Aldila Sutjiadi
- (United States) Amy Zhu

== Champions ==
=== Singles ===
- (Japan) Misaki Doi def. (United Kingdom) Harriet Dart, 7–6^{(7–5)}, 6–2

=== Doubles ===
- (Mexico) Giuliana Olmos / (Mexico) Marcela Zacarías def. (Japan) Misaki Doi / (Poland) Katarzyna Kawa, 7–5, 1–6, [10–5]
