= 2020 Bellatorum Resources Pro Classic – Doubles =

Doubles
- 2020 Bellatorum Resources Pro Classic

Final
- Champions: (United States) Allura Zamarripa (United States) Maribella Zamarripa
- Runners-up: (Poland) Paula Kania-Choduń (Poland) Katarzyna Piter
- Score: 6–3, 5–7, [11–9]

Events
Singles	Doubles
← 2019 ·	Tyler Pro Classic	· 2021 →

Beatrice Gumulya and Jessy Rompies were the defending champions but chose not to participate.

Twins Allura and Maribella Zamarripa won the title, defeating Polish duo Paula Kania-Choduń and Katarzyna Piter in the final, 6–3, 5–7, [11–9].

== Seeds ==
1. (United States) Caroline Dolehide / (United States) Caty McNally (quarterfinals)
2. (Japan) Misaki Doi / (Serbia) Nina Stojanović (withdrew)
3. (Kazakhstan) Anna Danilina / (India) Ankita Raina (first round)
4. (Poland) Paula Kania-Choduń / (Poland) Katarzyna Piter (final)

== Draw ==
=== Key ===
- Q = Qualifier
- WC = Wild card
- LL = Lucky loser
- Alt = Alternate
- SE = Special exempt
- PR = Protected ranking
- ITF = ITF entry
- JE = Junior exempt
- w/o = Walkover
- r = Retired
- d = Defaulted
- SR = Special ranking

=== Draw ===
First round
1	(United States) C Dolehide (United States) C McNally	6	6
(Spain) A Bolsova (Belgium) G Minnen	3	1
WC	(Mexico) F Contreras (United States) F Maltby	2	1
Alt	(United States) A Zamarripa (United States) M Zamarripa	6	6
3	(Kazakhstan) A Danilina (India) A Raina	2	2
(Ukraine) M Kostyuk (Denmark) C Tauson	6	6
(Spain) L Arruabarrena (Italy) S Errani	6	6
(United States) F Di Lorenzo (United States) J Loeb	2	4
WC	(United States) H Baptiste (United States) M Mateas	6	3	[10]
(United States) W Osuigwe (United States) S Vickery	3	6	[5]
WC	(United States) S Broadus (United States) K Collins	7^{7}	5	[6]
4	(Poland) P Kania-Choduń (Poland) K Piter	6^{6}	7	[10]
(United States) I Neel (United States) C Whoriskey	6^{5}	2
(Ukraine) K Bondarenko (Belarus) O Govortsova	7^{7}	6
(United States) K Ahn (United Kingdom) N Broady	w/o
Alt	(Colombia) C Osorio (Mexico) R Zarazúa

Quarterfinals
1	(United States) C Dolehide (United States) C McNally	4	6	[4]
Alt	(United States) A Zamarripa (United States) M Zamarripa	6	4	[10]
(Ukraine) M Kostyuk (Denmark) C Tauson	w/o
(Spain) L Arruabarrena (Italy) S Errani
WC	(United States) H Baptiste (United States) M Mateas	1	0
4	(Poland) P Kania-Choduń (Poland) K Piter	6	6
(Ukraine) K Bondarenko (Belarus) O Govortsova	6	6
(United States) K Ahn (United Kingdom) N Broady	1	1

Semifinals
Alt	(United States) A Zamarripa (United States) M Zamarripa	w/o
(Ukraine) M Kostyuk (Denmark) C Tauson
4	(Poland) P Kania-Choduń (Poland) K Piter	4	6	[10]
(Ukraine) K Bondarenko (Belarus) O Govortsova	6	2	[6]

Final
Alt	(United States) A Zamarripa (United States) M Zamarripa	6	5	[11]
4	(Poland) P Kania-Choduń (Poland) K Piter	3	7	[9]
