= 2021 Christus Health Pro Challenge – Singles =

Singles
- 2021 Christus Health Pro Challenge

Final
- Champion: (Japan) Misaki Doi
- Runner-up: (United Kingdom) Harriet Dart
- Score: 7–6^{(7–5)}, 6–2

Events
Singles	Doubles
← 2020 ·	Tyler Pro Challenge	· 2022 →

Ann Li was the defending champion but chose to compete at the 2021 Courmayeur Ladies Open instead.

Misaki Doi won the title, defeating Harriet Dart in the final, 7–6^{(7–5)}, 6–2.

== Seeds ==
1. (United States) Madison Brengle (quarterfinals)
2. (United States) Claire Liu (quarterfinals)
3. (Brazil) Beatriz Haddad Maia (semifinals)
4. (Japan) Misaki Doi (champion)
5. (United Kingdom) Harriet Dart (final)
6. (China) Wang Xiyu (first round)
7. (United States) Caty McNally (quarterfinals)
8. (Poland) Katarzyna Kawa (quarterfinals)

== Draw ==
=== Key ===
- Q = Qualifier
- WC = Wild card
- LL = Lucky loser
- Alt = Alternate
- SE = Special exempt
- PR = Protected ranking
- ITF = ITF entry
- JE = Junior exempt
- w/o = Walkover
- r = Retired
- d = Defaulted
- SR = Special ranking

=== Finals ===
Semifinals
(Mexico) Marcela Zacarías	5	0
4	(Japan) Misaki Doi	7	6
3	(Brazil) Beatriz Haddad Maia	4	6	2
5	(United Kingdom) Harriet Dart	6	4	6

Final
4	(Japan) Misaki Doi	7^{7}	6
5	(United Kingdom) Harriet Dart	6^{5}	2

=== Top half ===
First round
1	(United States) M Brengle	4	6	6
Q	(Indonesia) A Sutjiadi	6	1	0
(United States) A Glatch	7^{7}	6
WC	(United States) R Brantmeier	6^{2}	0
Q	(United States) W Osuigwe	4	6	6
WC	(United States) M Mateas	6	1	4
(Mexico) M Zacarías	6	7
6	(China) Xiy Wang	4	5
4	(Japan) M Doi	6	3	6
Q	(United States) S Chang	4	6	3
PR	(South Korea) N-l Han	6	7
Q	(United States) E Douglas	1	5
(United States) G Min	6	6
Q	(United States) A Zhu	4	3
Q	(United States) E Mandlik	5	4
8	(Poland) K Kawa	7	6

Second round
1	(United States) M Brengle	6	6
(United States) A Glatch	2	4
Q	(United States) W Osuigwe	3	6	5
(Mexico) M Zacarías	6	1	7
4	(Japan) M Doi	7	6
PR	(South Korea) N-l Han	5	3
(United States) G Min	0	3
8	(Poland) K Kawa	6	6

Quarterfinals
1	(United States) M Brengle	4	3
(Mexico) M Zacarías	6	6
4	(Japan) M Doi	6	6
8	(Poland) K Kawa	3	4

Semifinals
(Mexico) M Zacarías	5	0
4	(Japan) M Doi	7	6

=== Bottom half ===
First round
7	(United States) C McNally	6	6
Q	(United States) A Krueger	2	3
(United States) C Harrison	6	6
WC	(United States) A Smith	4	2
(Switzerland) C Perrin	6^{2}	6	6
Q	(Serbia) K Kozarov	7^{7}	2	3
WC	(Russia) M Kononova	1	1
3	(Brazil) B Haddad Maia	6	6
5	(United Kingdom) H Dart	6	6^{5}	6
(Japan) K Nara	3	7^{7}	1
(United States) H Baptiste	2	2
(France) T Andrianjafitrimo	6	6
(United States) K Volynets	6	7
(Thailand) P Plipuech	0	5
(United States) F Di Lorenzo	6^{3}	1
2	(United States) C Liu	7^{7}	6

Second round
7	(United States) C McNally	7	6
(United States) C Harrison	5	3
(Switzerland) C Perrin	1	2
3	(Brazil) B Haddad Maia	6	6
5	(United Kingdom) H Dart	6	6
(France) T Andrianjafitrimo	1	2
(United States) K Volynets	4	6	1
2	(United States) C Liu	6	1	6

Quarterfinals
7	(United States) C McNally	4	4
3	(Brazil) B Haddad Maia	6	6
5	(United Kingdom) H Dart	6	6
2	(United States) C Liu	3	4

Semifinals
3	(Brazil) B Haddad Maia	4	6	2
5	(United Kingdom) H Dart	6	4	6
