= 2023 Dallas Summer Series =

Tennis tournament

- Date: 24–30 July 2023
- Edition: 2nd
- Category: ITF Women's World Tennis Tour
- Prize money: $60,000
- Surface: Hard / Indoor
- Location: Dallas, United States

Champions

Singles
- (Ukraine) Yulia Starodubtseva

Doubles
- (United States) Sophie Chang / (United States) Ashley Lahey
← 2022 ·	Dallas Summer Series	· 2024 →

The 2023 Dallas Summer Series was a professional tennis tournament played on indoor hard courts. It was the second edition of the tournament, which was part of the 2023 ITF Women's World Tennis Tour. It took place in Dallas, United States, between 24 and 30 July 2023.

== Champions ==
=== Singles ===
- (Ukraine) Yulia Starodubtseva def. (China) Wang Yafan, 3–6, 6–2, 6–2

=== Doubles ===
- (United States) Sophie Chang / (United States) Ashley Lahey def. (United States) Makenna Jones / (United States) Jamie Loeb, 6–2, 6–2

== Singles main draw entrants ==
=== Seeds ===
Country	Player	Rank	Seed
USA	Madison Brengle	102	1
CHN	Wang Yafan	182	2
USA	Ann Li	187	3
MEX	Marcela Zacarías	192	4
USA	Hailey Baptiste	198	5
JPN	Himeno Sakatsume	223	6
~~USA~~	~~Katrina Scott~~	~~226~~	~~7~~
MEX	Renata Zarazúa	238	8

- Rankings are as of 17 July 2023.

=== Other entrants ===
The following players received wildcards into the singles main draw:

- (United States) Eryn Cayetano
- (United States) Hadley Doyle
- (United States) Alanis Hamilton
- (United States) Chloe Henderson

The following players received entry from the qualifying draw:

- (United States) Chloe Beck
- (United States) Reese Brantmeier
- (United States) Dalayna Hewitt
- (United States) McCartney Kessler
- (United States) Allie Kiick
- (United States) Raveena Kingsley
- (United States) Madison Sieg
- (United States) Mary Stoiana

The following player received entry as a lucky loser:

- (United States) Grace Min
