= 2023 Dallas Summer Series – Singles =

Singles
- 2023 Dallas Summer Series

Final
- Champion: (Ukraine) Yulia Starodubtseva
- Runner-up: (China) Wang Yafan
- Score: 3–6, 6–2, 6–2

Events
Singles	Doubles
← 2022 ·	Dallas Summer Series	· 2024 →

Katrina Scott was the defending champion but withdrew before her first round match.

Yulia Starodubtseva won the title, defeating Wang Yafan in the final, 3–6, 6–2, 6–2.

== Seeds ==
1. (United States) Madison Brengle (quarterfinals)
2. (China) Wang Yafan (final)
3. (United States) Ann Li (second round)
4. (Mexico) Marcela Zacarías (first round)
5. (United States) Hailey Baptiste (first round, retired)
6. (Japan) Himeno Sakatsume (quarterfinals)
7. (United States) Katrina Scott (withdrew)
8. (Mexico) Renata Zarazúa (quarterfinals)

== Draw ==
=== Key ===
- Q = Qualifier
- WC = Wild card
- LL = Lucky loser
- Alt = Alternate
- SE = Special exempt
- PR = Protected ranking
- ITF = ITF entry
- JE = Junior exempt
- w/o = Walkover
- r = Retired
- d = Defaulted
- SR = Special ranking

=== Finals ===
Semifinals
(Ukraine) Yulia Starodubtseva	5	6	6
(China) Ma Yexin	7	3	3
Q	(United States) Mary Stoiana	6	6^{2}	4
2	(China) Wang Yafan	3	7^{7}	6

Final
(Ukraine) Yulia Starodubtseva	3	6	6
2	(China) Wang Yafan	6	2	2

=== Top half ===
First round
1	(United States) M Brengle	6	6
Q	(United States) M Sieg	4	1
(United States) R Anderson	2	2
Q	(United States) C Beck	6	6
(Ukraine) Y Starodubtseva	6	6
(United States) J Loeb	3	2
WC	(United States) H Doyle	6	6
LL	(United States) G Min	4	2
4	(Mexico) M Zacarías	7^{9}	1	2
(China) Y Ma	6^{7}	6	6
(India) K Thandi	6	6
WC	(United States) C Henderson	1	1
Q	(United States) R Kingsley	6	6
(United States) S Chang	3	0
WC	(United States) A Hamilton	6	5	0
8	(Mexico) R Zarazúa	4	7	6

Second round
1	(United States) M Brengle	6	6^{1}	6
Q	(United States) C Beck	1	7^{7}	2
(Ukraine) Y Starodubtseva	w/o
WC	(United States) H Doyle
(China) Y Ma	6	6
(India) K Thandi	4	3
Q	(United States) R Kingsley	4	2
8	(Mexico) R Zarazúa	6	6

Quarterfinals
1	(United States) M Brengle	6	1	4
(Ukraine) Y Starodubtseva	4	6	6
(China) Y Ma	6	7
8	(Mexico) R Zarazúa	1	5

Semifinals
(Ukraine) Y Starodubtseva	5	6	6
(China) Y Ma	7	3	3

=== Bottom half ===
First round
6	(Japan) H Sakatsume	6	6
WC	(United States) E Cayetano	4	1
(Japan) K Okamura	6	1	6
(Bosnia and Herzegovina) N Berberović	0	6	1
(United States) A Lahey	1	6^{1}
Q	(United States) M Stoiana	6	7^{7}
(United States) W Osuigwe	6	1	1
3	(United States) A Li	4	6	6
5	(United States) H Baptiste	4	0^{r}
(United States) H Chang	6	0
(United States) M Jones	6	6
Q	(United States) R Brantmeier	4	0
Q	(United States) A Kiick	6^{5}	1
Q	(United States) M Kessler	7^{7}	6
Q	(United States) D Hewitt	6^{5}	6^{5}
2	(China) Y Wang	7^{7}	7^{7}

Second round
6	(Japan) H Sakatsume	7^{9}	6
(Japan) K Okamura	6^{7}	2
Q	(United States) M Stoiana	6	6
3	(United States) A Li	1	3
(United States) H Chang	3	4
(United States) M Jones	6	6
Q	(United States) M Kessler	2	4
2	(China) Y Wang	6	6

Quarterfinals
6	(Japan) H Sakatsume	2	3
Q	(United States) M Stoiana	6	6
(United States) M Jones	4	1
2	(China) Y Wang	6	6

Semifinals
Q	(United States) M Stoiana	6	6^{2}	4
2	(China) Y Wang	3	7^{7}	6
