= 2020 Bellatorum Resources Pro Classic =

Tennis tournament

- Date: 26 October–1 November 2020
- Edition: 4th
- Category: ITF Women's World Tennis Tour
- Prize money: $80,000
- Surface: Hard
- Location: Tyler, Texas, United States

Champions

Singles
- (United States) Ann Li

Doubles
- (United States) Allura Zamarripa / (United States) Maribella Zamarripa
| ← 2019 · | Tyler Pro Classic | · 2021 → |

The 2020 Bellatorum Resources Pro Classic was a professional tennis tournament played on outdoor hard courts. It was the fourth edition of the tournament which was part of the 2020 ITF Women's World Tennis Tour. It took place in Tyler, Texas, United States between 26 October and 1 November 2020.

== Singles main-draw entrants ==
=== Seeds ===
| Country | Player | Rank^{1} | Seed |
|---|---|---|---|
| USA | Shelby Rogers | 59 | 1 |
| JPN | Misaki Doi | 86 | 2 |
| ~~SRB~~ | ~~Nina Stojanović~~ | ~~98~~ | ~~3~~ |
| ESP | Aliona Bolsova | 102 | 4 |
| USA | Kristie Ahn | 105 | 5 |
| GER | Anna-Lena Friedsam | 107 | 6 |
| USA | Ann Li | 112 | 7 |
| UKR | Marta Kostyuk | 113 | 8 |

- ^{1} Rankings are as of 19 October 2020.

=== Other entrants ===
The following players received wildcards into the singles main draw:

- (United States) Hailey Baptiste
- (Mexico) Fernanda Contreras
- ~~(United States) Varvara Lepchenko~~
- (United States) Katie Volynets

The following player received entry as a junior exempt:

- (France) Diane Parry

The following player received entry as a special exempt:

- (United States) Catherine Bellis

The following players received entry from the qualifying draw:

- (Spain) Georgina García Pérez
- (Japan) Mayo Hibi
- (United States) Jamie Loeb
- (Colombia) Camila Osorio
- (India) Ankita Raina
- (United States) Peyton Stearns
- (Denmark) Clara Tauson
- (Mexico) Renata Zarazúa

The following players received entry as lucky losers:

- (Paraguay) Verónica Cepede Royg
- (Poland) Paula Kania-Choduń
- (Switzerland) Conny Perrin

== Champions ==
=== Singles ===
- (United States) Ann Li def. (Ukraine) Marta Kostyuk, 7–5, 1–6, 6–3

=== Doubles ===
- (United States) Allura Zamarripa / (United States) Maribella Zamarripa def. (Poland) Paula Kania-Choduń / (Poland) Katarzyna Piter, 6–3, 5–7, [11–9]
