= Dallas Summer Series =

- 2023 Dallas Summer Series

ITF Women's Tour
- Event name: Dallas Summer Series
- Location: Dallas, United States
- Venue: Styslinger/Altec Tennis Complex
- Category: ITF Women's World Tennis Tour
- Surface: Hard / indoor
- Draw: 32S/32Q/16D
- Prize money: $40,000

The Dallas Summer Series is a tournament for professional female tennis players played on indoor hard courts. The event was classified as a $40,000 ITF Women's World Tennis Tour tournament and has been held in Dallas, United States, since 2022. The event was held as a $60k tournament in 2023.

== Past finals ==
=== Singles ===
Year	Champion	Runner-up	Score
2026	(United States) Hanna Chang	Alina Shcherbinina	2–6, 6–4, 6–4
2025	Not held		
2024	(United States) Clervie Ngounoue	(United States) Robin Anderson	2–6, 6–3, 7–5
2023	(Ukraine) Yulia Starodubtseva	(China) Wang Yafan	3–6, 6–2, 6–2
2022	(United States) Katrina Scott	(United States) Elvina Kalieva	6–1, 6–0

=== Doubles ===
Year	Champions	Runners-up	Score
2026	(Thailand) Mananchaya Sawangkaew (Hong Kong) Cody Wong	(United States) Sophie Llewellyn (Ukraine) Anita Sahdiieva	6–3, 6–1
2025	Not held		
2024	(United States) Usue Maitane Arconada (United States) Katrina Scott	(Mexico) Jessica Hinojosa Gómez (Japan) Hiroko Kuwata	6–3, 6–3
2023	(United States) Sophie Chang (United States) Ashley Lahey	(United States) Makenna Jones (United States) Jamie Loeb	6–2, 6–2
2022	Maria Kozyreva; Veronika Miroshnichenko	(United States) Jessie Aney (United States) Jessica Failla	6–4, 6–7^{(7–9)}, [10–5]
