= Nell Miller =

British tennis player

- Country (sports): United Kingdom
- Born: 25 February 2000 (age 25); Kent, England
- Plays: Right-handed
- College: NC State
- Prize money: $15,062

Singles
- Career record: 22–27
- Career titles: 0
- Highest ranking: No. 846 (31 December 2018)

Doubles
- Career record: 19–16
- Career titles: 3 ITF
- Highest ranking: No. 464 (20 February 2023)
- Current ranking: No. 901 (5 August 2024)

Grand Slam doubles results
- Wimbledon: 1R (2022)
- Last updated on: 6 August 2024.

Nell Miller (born 25 February 2000) is an inactive English tennis player.

Miller currently plays college tennis at North Carolina State. In 2022, Miller and doubles partner Jaeda Daniel became the first NC State players to win the NCAA Division I Women's Doubles Championship. Miller and Daniel additionally earned ITA All-American accolade in 2022.

In June 2022, Miller and partner Sonay Kartal earned a wildcard entry into the women's doubles draw in Wimbledon.

== Grand Slam doubles performance timeline ==
Key
W	F	SF	QF	#R	RR	Q#	P#	DNQ	A	Z#	PO	G	S	B	NMS	NTI	P	NH

(W) winner; (F) finalist; (SF) semifinalist; (QF) quarterfinalist; (#R) rounds 4, 3, 2, 1; (RR) round-robin stage; (Q#) qualification round; (P#) preliminary round; (DNQ) did not qualify; (A) absent; (Z#) Davis/Fed Cup Zonal Group (with number indication) or (PO) play-off; (G) gold, (S) silver or (B) bronze Olympic/Paralympic medal; (NMS) not a Masters tournament; (NTI) not a Tier I tournament; (P) postponed; (NH) not held; (SR) strike rate (events won / competed); (W–L) win–loss record.
To avoid confusion and double counting, these charts are updated at the conclusion of a tournament or when the player's participation has ended.

== ITF Circuit finals ==
=== Doubles: 4 (3 titles, 1 runner-up) ===
Legend $80,000 tournaments (0–1) $15,000 tournaments (3–0)	Finals by surface Hard (3–1)

Result	W–L	Date	Tournament	Tier	Surface	Partner	Opponents	Score
Win	1–0	Dec 2019	ITF Norman, United States	15,000	Hard	(Australia) Lisa Mays	(United States) Carmen Corley (United States) Ivana Corley	7–6^{(5)}, 4–6, [10–8]
Loss	1–1	Oct 2022	Tyler Pro Challenge, US	80,000	Hard	(United States) Jaeda Daniel	Maria Kozyreva (United States) Ashley Lahey	5–7, 2–6
Win	2–1	Nov 2022	ITF Santo Domingo, Dominican Republic	15,000	Hard	(United Kingdom) Amelia Rajecki	(United States) Brittany Collens (Canada) Louise Kwong	7–5, 6–1
Win	3–1	Sep 2023	ITF Monastir, Tunisia	15,000	Hard	(Lithuania) Andrė Lukošiūtė	(Serbia) Darja Suvirdjonkova (Belgium) Amelia Waligora	6–3, 6–2
