= 2020 Bellatorum Resources Pro Classic – Singles =

Singles
- 2020 Bellatorum Resources Pro Classic

Final
- Champion: (United States) Ann Li
- Runner-up: (Ukraine) Marta Kostyuk
- Score: 7–5, 1–6, 6–3

Events
Singles	Doubles
← 2019 ·	Tyler Pro Classic	· 2021 →

Mandy Minella was the defending champion, but chose not to participate as she was on maternity leave.

Ann Li won the title, defeating Marta Kostyuk in the final, 7–5, 1–6, 6–3.

== Seeds ==
1. (United States) Shelby Rogers (second round)
2. (Japan) Misaki Doi (second round)
3. (Serbia) Nina Stojanović (withdrew)
4. (Spain) Aliona Bolsova (quarterfinals)
5. (United States) Kristie Ahn (first round)
6. (Germany) Anna-Lena Friedsam (first round)
7. (United States) Ann Li (champion)
8. (Ukraine) Marta Kostyuk (final)

== Draw ==
=== Key ===
- Q = Qualifier
- WC = Wild card
- LL = Lucky loser
- Alt = Alternate
- SE = Special exempt
- PR = Protected ranking
- ITF = ITF entry
- JE = Junior exempt
- w/o = Walkover
- r = Retired
- d = Defaulted
- SR = Special ranking

=== Finals ===
Semifinals
7	(United States) Ann Li	7	7
(Belgium) Greet Minnen	5	5
SE	(United States) Catherine Bellis
8	(Ukraine) Marta Kostyuk	w/o

Final
7	(United States) Ann Li	7	1	6
8	(Ukraine) Marta Kostyuk	5	6	3

=== Top half ===
First round
1	(United States) S Rogers	6	6
(United States) W Osuigwe	3	3
Q	(Denmark) C Tauson	6	6
(United States) C McNally	3	1
Q	(Japan) M Hibi	4	5
LL	(Poland) P Kania-Choduń	6	7
JE	(France) D Parry	3	4
7	(United States) A Li	6	6
Q	(United States) P Stearns	2	5
(Belgium) G Minnen	6	7
Q	(Mexico) R Zarazúa	6	6
LL	(Switzerland) C Perrin	1	1
(Poland) K Kawa	6	6
(Belarus) O Govortsova	3	2
WC	(United States) H Baptiste	6	6
5	(United States) K Ahn	2	2

Second round
1	(United States) S Rogers	7	5	3
Q	(Denmark) C Tauson	5	7	6
LL	(Poland) P Kania-Choduń	2	2
7	(United States) A Li	6	6
(Belgium) G Minnen	6	7
Q	(Mexico) R Zarazúa	2	5
(Poland) K Kawa	6	4	6
WC	(United States) H Baptiste	3	6	1

Quarterfinals
Q	(Denmark) C Tauson	3	5
7	(United States) A Li	6	7
(Belgium) G Minnen	4	6	6
(Poland) K Kawa	6	3	1

Semifinals
7	(United States) A Li	7	7
(Belgium) G Minnen	5	5

=== Bottom half ===
First round
6	(Germany) A-L Friedsam	3	3
SE	(United States) C Bellis	6	6
Q	(Spain) G García Pérez	3	6	6^{1}
Q	(United States) J Loeb	6	3	7^{7}
(United States) S Vickery	1	3
(United States) C Dolehide	6	6
Q	(India) A Raina	5	2
4	(Spain) A Bolsova	7	6
8	(Ukraine) M Kostyuk	6	6
WC	(Mexico) F Contreras	0	0
WC	(United States) K Volynets	6^{6}	3
LL	(Paraguay) V Cepede Royg	7^{8}	6
Q	(Colombia) C Osorio	3	1
(Italy) S Errani	6	6
(United States) F Di Lorenzo	1	3
2	(Japan) M Doi	6	6

Second round
SE	(United States) C Bellis	3	6	6
Q	(United States) J Loeb	6	1	2
(United States) C Dolehide	6^{2}	6	3
4	(Spain) A Bolsova	7^{7}	4	6
8	(Ukraine) M Kostyuk	6	7
LL	(Paraguay) V Cepede Royg	2	5
(Italy) S Errani	2	6	6
2	(Japan) M Doi	6	3	1

Quarterfinals
SE	(United States) C Bellis	6	2	7
4	(Spain) A Bolsova	0	6	5
8	(Ukraine) M Kostyuk	6	6
(Italy) S Errani	2	1

Semifinals
SE	(United States) C Bellis
8	(Ukraine) M Kostyuk	w/o
