= Jaeda Daniel =

American tennis player (born 1999)

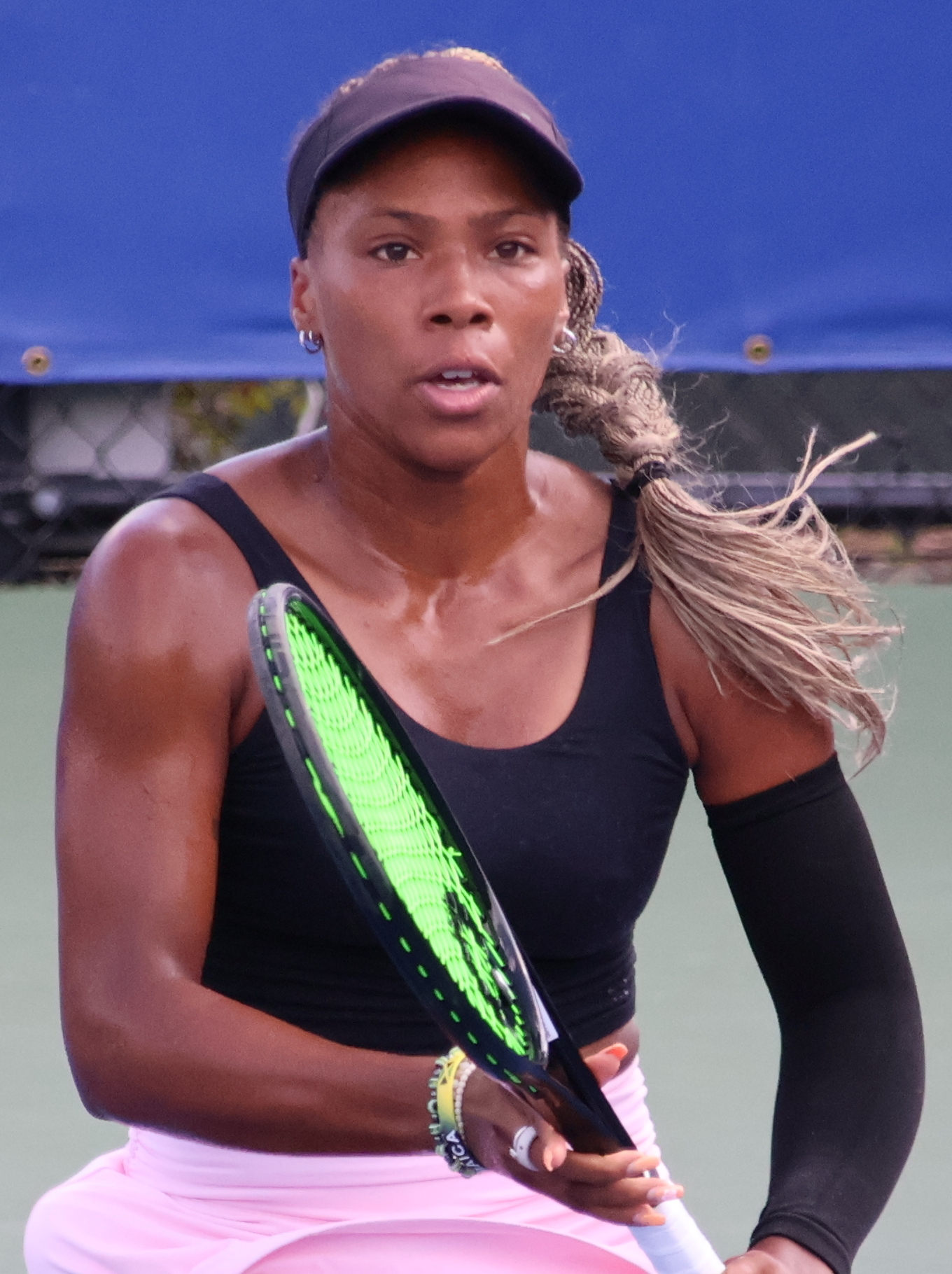
- Daniel in 2026
- Country (sports): United States
- Born: 28 July 1999 (age 27) Newton Square, Pennsylvania, US
- Plays: Left-handed
- College: NC State
- Prize money: $82,290

Singles
- Career record: 179–178
- Highest ranking: No. 522 (April 6, 2026)
- Current ranking: No. 665 (August 31, 2026)

Doubles
- Career record: 126–98
- Career titles: 9 ITF
- Highest ranking: No. 246 (May 18, 2026)
- Current ranking: No. 248 (August 31, 2026)

Grand Slam mixed doubles results
- US Open: 1R (2022)
- Last updated on: 9 September 2026.

Jaeda Daniel (born 28 July 1999) is an American tennis player.

Daniel has a career-high singles ranking by the WTA of 522, reached in April 2026, and a career-high doubles ranking of world No. 246, achieved on 18 May 2026.

She played college tennis at North Carolina State. In 2022, Daniel and doubles partner Nell Miller became the first NC State players to win the NCAA Division I Women's Doubles Championship.

Daniel earned All-American honors in both singles and doubles in 2022, and was named the 2022 ITA Most Improved Senior

== ITF Circuit finals ==
=== Singles: 3 (3 runner-ups) ===
Legend
W10/15 tournaments

| Result | W–L | Date | Tournament | Tier | Surface | Opponent | Score |
|---|---|---|---|---|---|---|---|
| Loss | 0–1 | Jun 2015 | ITF Antananarivo, Madagascar | W10 | Clay | (Hungary) Lilla Barzó | 5–7, 2–6 |
| Loss | 0–2 | Jun 2015 | ITF Grand Baie, Mauritius | W10 | Hard | (Czech Republic) Marie Bouzková | 5–7, 2–6 |
| Loss | 0–3 | Feb 2023 | ITF Ipoh, Malaysia | W15 | Hard | (Thailand) Lanlana Tararudee | 0–6, 6–3, 2–6 |

=== Doubles: 20 (10 titles, 10 runner-ups) ===
Legend
W80 tournaments
W60/75 tournaments
W50 tournaments
W25/35 tournaments
W15 tournaments

| Result | W–L | Date | Tournament | Tier | Surface | Partner | Opponents | Score |
|---|---|---|---|---|---|---|---|---|
| Loss | 0–1 | Feb 2017 | ITF Manacor, Spain | W15 | Clay | (United States) Quinn Gleason | (United States) Lauren Embree (Chile) Alexa Guarachi | 1–6, 5–7 |
| Loss | 0–2 | Sep 2022 | ITF Monastir, Tunisia | W15 | Hard | (United Kingdom) Abigail Amos | (Chinese Taipei) Lee Ya-hsin (Chinese Taipei) Tsao Chia-yi | 0–6, 1–6 |
| Loss | 0–3 | Oct 2022 | Tyler Pro Challenge, United States | W80 | Hard | (United Kingdom) Nell Miller | Maria Kozyreva (United States) Ashley Lahey | 5–7, 2–6 |
| Win | 1–3 | Apr 2023 | ITF Jackson, United States | W25 | Hard | (United States) McCartney Kessler | (United States) Allura Zamarripa (United States) Maribella Zamarripa | 1–6, 6–1, [10–5] |
| Loss | 1–4 | Oct 2023 | ITF Templeton Pro, United States | W60 | Hard | (United States) Jessie Aney | (United States) McCartney Kessler (United States) Alana Smith | 5–7, 4–6 |
| Win | 2–4 | Jan 2024 | ITF Le Gosier, France (Guadeloupe) | W35 | Hard | (United States) Haley Giavara | (France) Émeline Dartron (France) Emma Léné | 6–2, 7–6^{(0)} |
| Win | 3–4 | Mar 2024 | ITF Campinas, Brazil | W15 | Clay | Maria Kononova | (Brazil) Júlia Konishi Camargo Silva (Japan) Wakana Sonobe | 6–0, 6–7^{(3)}, [10–4] |
| Win | 4–4 | May 2024 | ITF Bethany Beach, United States | W35 | Clay | (Canada) Kayla Cross | (United States) Ashton Bowers (United States) Mia Yamakita | 7–6^{(3)}, 7–6^{(2)} |
| Win | 5–4 | Aug 2024 | ITF São Paulo, Brazil | W35 | Clay | Anastasiia Grechkina | (Italy) Giorgia Pedone (Italy) Aurora Zantedeschi | walkover |
| Loss | 5–5 | Oct 2024 | ITF Santa Margherita di Pula, Italy | W35 | Clay | (Burundi) Sada Nahimana | (Italy) Miriana Tona (Italy) Anastasia Abbagnato | 7–6^{(3)}, 3–6, [10–12] |
| Win | 6–5 | May 2025 | ITF Bethany Beach, United States | W35 | Clay | (United States) Ivana Corley | (Japan) Haruna Arakawa (United States) Haley Giavara | 6–4, 7–5 |
| Loss | 6–6 | June 2025 | ITF Decatur, United States | W35 | Hard | (United States) Salma Ewing | (United States) Susanna Maltby (United States) Maddy Zampardo | 7–5, 5–7, [7–10] |
| Loss | 6–7 | Sep 2025 | ITF Rancho Santa Fe, United States | W50 | Hard | (United States) Fiona Crawley | (Japan) Himeno Sakatsume (Japan) Wakana Sonobe | 6–7^{(5)}, 6–3, [5–10] |
| Win | 7–7 | Oct 2025 | ITF Redding, United States | W35 | Hard | (Australia) Elysia Bolton | (United States) Kolie Allen (United States) Rasheeda McAdoo | 7–5, 7–5 |
| Loss | 7–8 | Oct 2025 | Toronto Challenger, Canada | W75 | Hard (i) | (United States) Fiona Crawley | (Slovakia) Viktória Hrunčáková; Anastasia Tikhonova | 4–6, 2–6 |
| Loss | 7–9 | Jan 2026 | ITF Bradenton, United States | W35 | Hard | (United States) Dalayna Hewitt | (United States) Carmen Corley (United States) Ivana Corley | 6–4, 3–6, [5–10] |
| Loss | 7–10 | Feb 2026 | Arcadi Pro Open, United States | W35 | Hard | (Ukraine) Anita Sahdiieva | (United States) Eryn Cayetano (United States) Haley Giavara | 1–6, 1–6 |
| Win | 8–10 | Apr 2026 | ITF Goyang, South Korea | W35 | Hard | (South Korea) Back Da-yeon | (South Korea) Kim Da-bin (South Korea) Park So-hyun | 6–4, 6–0 |
| Win | 9–10 | Jun 2026 | Georgia's Rome Open, United States | W35 | Hard | (Australia) Lily Fairclough | (United States) Savannah Broadus (United States) Kylie Collins | 7–5, 6–4 |
| Win | 10–10 | Oct 2026 | ITF Villeneuve-d'Ascq, France | W35 | Hard (i) | (Burundi) Sada Nahimana | (South Korea) Im Hee-rae (South Korea) Kim Eun-chae | 6–3, 6–2 |
