= Ashley Lahey =

American tennis player

- Country (sports): United States
- Born: October 26, 1999 (age 27)
- Plays: Right-handed
- College: Pepperdine
- Prize money: $97,532

Singles
- Career record: 157–115
- Career titles: 2 ITF
- Highest ranking: No. 317 (September 18, 2023)
- Current ranking: No. 891 (August 24, 2026)

Doubles
- Career record: 87–57
- Career titles: 9 ITF
- Highest ranking: No. 170 (September 25, 2023)
- Current ranking: No. 502 (August 24, 2026)
- Last updated on: August 28, 2026.

Ashley Lahey (born October 26, 1999) is an American tennis player.

Lahey has a career-high singles ranking of 317 by the WTA, achieved on 18 September 2023. She also has a career-high WTA doubles ranking of 170, achieved on 25 September 2023.

She played college tennis at Pepperdine University.

Lahey won her first bigger ITF title at the 2022 Tyler Pro Challenge, in the doubles draw, partnering Maria Kozyreva. From October 2025 until June 2026, she was inactive on the pro tour.

== WTA 125 finals ==
=== Doubles: 1 (runner-up) ===
Result	W–L	Date	Tournament	Surface	Partner	Opponents	Score
Loss	0–1	Nov 2023	Midland Tennis Classic, United States	Hard (i)	(United States) Sophie Chang	(United States) Hailey Baptiste (United States) Whitney Osuigwe	6–2, 2–6, [1–10]

== ITF Circuit finals ==
=== Singles: 8 (5 titles, 3 runner-ups) ===
Legend
W25/35 tournaments (1–2)
W15 tournaments (4–1)

Result	W–L	Date	Tournament	Tier	Surface	Opponent	Score
Win	1–0	Jun 2017	ITF Sumter, United States	W25	Hard	(United States) Francesca Di Lorenzo	6–3, 7–6^{(4)}
Loss	1–1	Feb 2022	ITF Villena, Spain	W15	Hard	(Spain) Jéssica Bouzas Maneiro	2–6, 1–6
Loss	1–2	Nov 2022	ITF Funchal, Portugal	W25	Hard	(United States) Emina Bektas	6–2, 3–6, 2–6
Loss	1–3	Jan 2024	ITF Arcadia, United States	W35	Hard	(United States) Fiona Crawley	6–4, 2–6, 5–7
Win	2–3	Aug 2025	ITF Logroño, Spain	W15	Hard	(United Kingdom) Alice Gillan	6–2, 6–3
Win	3–3	Aug 2026	ITF Brașov, Romania	W15	Clay	(Romania) Ilinca Amariei	4–6, 6–2, 7–5
Win	4–3	Aug 2026	ITF Badalona, Spain	W15	Clay	(Greece) Marianna Argyrokastriti	6–4, 2–6, 6–4
Win	5–3	Nov 2026	ITF Hilton Head Island, United States	W15	Clay	(Morocco) Aya El Aouni	6–2, 4–6, 6–3

=== Doubles: 21 (9 titles, 12 runner-ups) ===
Legend W80 tournaments (1–0) W60/75 tournaments (1–2) W50 tournaments (1–2) W25/35 tournaments (6–8)	Finals by surface Hard (6–8) Clay (3–4)

Result	W–L	Date	Tournament	Tier	Surface	Partner	Opponents	Score
Loss	0–1	Jul 2018	Championships of Honolulu, United States	W60	Hard	(United States) Taylor Johnson	(Japan) Misaki Doi (United States) Jessica Pegula	6–7^{(4)}, 3–6
Win	1–1	Jun 2021	ITF Madrid, Spain	W25	Hard	(Australia) Olivia Tjandramulia	(Spain) Yvonne Cavallé Reimers (Spain) Celia Cerviño Ruiz	6–2, 4–6, [10–8]
Loss	1–2	Jun 2022	ITF Ystad, Sweden	W25	Clay	(Sweden) Lisa Zaar	(Sweden) Caijsa Hennemann (Poland) Martyna Kubka	6–4, 5–7, [7–10]
Loss	1–3	Aug 2022	ITF Danderyd, Sweden	W25	Clay	(Sweden) Lisa Zaar	(Japan) Rina Saigo (Japan) Yukina Saigo	6–2, 5–7, [7–10]
Loss	1–4	Oct 2022	ITF Austin, United States	W25	Hard	(Poland) Martyna Kubka	(Australia) Elysia Bolton (United States) Jamie Loeb	3–6, 3–6
Win	2–4	Oct 2022	Tyler Pro Challenge, United States	W80	Hard	(Russia) Maria Kozyreva	(United States) Jaeda Daniel (United Kingdom) Nell Miller	7–5, 6–2
Win	3–4	Jan 2023	ITF Boca Raton, United States	W25	Clay	(France) Tiphanie Fiquet	(Canada) Kayla Cross (Mexico) Renata Zarazúa	4–6, 6–1, [10–4]
Win	4–4	May 2023	ITF Platja d'Aro, Spain	W25	Clay	(Australia) Ellen Perez	(Portugal) Francisca Jorge (Portugal) Matilde Jorge	6–3, 3–6, [12–10]
Win	5–4	Jul 2023	Dallas Summer Series, United States	W60	Hard (i)	(United States) Sophie Chang	(United States) Jamie Loeb (United States) Makenna Jones	2–6, 2–6
Loss	5–5	Sep 2023	ITF Zaragoza, Spain	W25	Clay	(United States) Kimmi Hance	(Italy) Martina Colmegna (Argentina) Solana Sierra	6–4, 4–6, [8–10]
Loss	5–6	Sep 2023	Caldas da Rainha Open, Portugal	W60+H	Hard	(China) Tian Fangran	(Portugal) Francisca Jorge (Portugal) Matilde Jorge	1–6, 6–2, [7–10]
Loss	5–7	Nov 2023	ITF Austin, United States	W25	Hard	Maria Kozyreva	(China) Han Jiangxue (China) Huang Yujia	5–7, 6–2, [8–10]
Win	6–7	Jan 2024	ITF Arcadia, United States	W35	Hard	(United States) Angela Kulikov	(United States) Haley Giavara (United States) Brandy Walker	6–3, 6–2
Win	7–7	Apr 2025	ITF Santa Margherita di Pula, Italy	W35	Clay	(Norway) Astrid Brune Olsen	(Netherlands) Jasmijn Gimbrère (Netherlands) Stéphanie Visscher	3–6, 6–4, [10–5]
Loss	7–8	Jun 2025	ITF Klosters, Switzerland	W35	Clay	(Netherlands) Jasmijn Gimbrère	(Italy) Deborah Chiesa (Italy) Lisa Pigato	0–6, 6–3, [6–10]
Loss	7–9	Jul 2025	ITF Monastir, Tunisia	W35	Hard	(France) Tiphanie Lemaître	(United Kingdom) Alicia Dudeney (Lithuania) Patricija Paukštytė	6–7^{(5)}, 4–6
Win	8–9	Aug 2025	ITF Southaven, United States	W35	Hard	(United States) Catherine Harrison	(Japan) Hiroko Kuwata (Japan) Kyōka Okamura	6–3, 6–2
Loss	8–10	Sep 2025	ITF Leiria, Portugal	W50	Hard	(United States) Catherine Harrison	(France) Julie Belgraver (Canada) Kayla Cross	6–3, 3–6, [8–10]
Win	9–10	Sep 2025	ITF Évora, Portugal	W50	Hard	(United States) Catherine Harrison	(Czech Republic) Gabriela Knutson (United States) Malaika Rapolu	6–1, 1–6, [10–8]
Loss	9–11	Oct 2026	ITF Austin, United States	W50	Hard	(Canada) Alexandra Vagramov	(United States) Kylie Collins (United Kingdom) Ella McDonald	0–6, 1–6
Loss	9–12	Oct 2026	ITF Norman, United States	W35	Hard	(Canada) Alexandra Vagramov	Evialina Laskevich; Edda Mamedova	6–4, 4–6, [8–10]
