= Maria Kozyreva =

Russian tennis player (born 1999)

- Full name: Maria Aleksandrovna Kozyreva
- Country (sports): Russia
- Born: 22 May 1999 (age 27) Saint Petersburg, Russia
- Plays: Right-handed
- Prize money: $289,281

Singles
- Career record: 110–86
- Career titles: 1 ITF
- Highest ranking: No. 342 (22 July 2024)
- Current ranking: No. 927 (28 September 2026)

Doubles
- Career record: 181–82
- Career titles: 1 WTA, 8 WTA 125
- Highest ranking: No. 51 (30 March 2026)
- Current ranking: No. 53 (28 September 2026)

Grand Slam doubles results
- Australian Open: 2R (2026)
- French Open: 1R (2026)
- Wimbledon: 1R (2026)
- US Open: 1R (2026)
- Last updated on: 11 October 2026.

Maria Alexandrovna Kozyreva (Russian: Мария Александровна Козырева, born 22 May 1999) is a Russian tennis player. She reached her best doubles ranking of world No. 51 on 30 March 2026. Kozyreva has won one WTA Tour title in doubles, partnering Maia Lumsden at the 2026 Memphis Classic, and eight WTA 125 doubles titles.

Kozyreva played college tennis for Saint Mary’s College of California and has been ranked as high as No. 15 in NCAA Division I singles.

== Career overview ==
Kozyreva claimed her first singles title in 2024 at the W50 event in São Paulo, Brazil. In 2025, she captured eight doubles titles, including four WTA 125 titles alongside partner Iryna Shymanovich.

Teaming up with Maia Lumsden, she won her first WTA Tour doubles title at the 2026 Memphis Classic, defeating second seeds Chan Hao-ching and Maya Joint in the final.

== WTA Tour finals ==
=== Doubles: 2 (1 title, 1 runner-up) ===
| Legend WTA 500 (0–1) WTA 250 (1–0) | Finals by surface Hard (1–1) |

| Result | W–L | Date | Tournament | Tier | Surface | Partner | Opponents | Score |
|---|---|---|---|---|---|---|---|---|
| Win | 1–0 | Jul 2026 | Memphis Classic, United States | WTA 250 | Hard | (United Kingdom) Maia Lumsden | (Chinese Taipei) Chan Hao-ching (Australia) Maya Joint | 7–6^{(3)}, 6–3 |
| Loss | 1–1 | Aug 2026 | Monterrey Open, Mexico | WTA 500 | Hard | (United Kingdom) Maia Lumsden | (Australia) Maya Joint (China) Xu Yifan | 2–6, 6–4, [5–10] |

== WTA 125 finals ==
=== Doubles: 8 (8 titles) ===
| Result | W–L | Date | Tournament | Surface | Partner | Opponents | Score |
|---|---|---|---|---|---|---|---|
| Win | 1–0 | Jun 2025 | Bari Open, Italy | Clay | Iryna Shymanovich | (Brazil) Ingrid Martins (United States) Quinn Gleason | 3–6, 6–4, [10–7] |
| Win | 2–0 | Jun 2025 | Internacional de Valencia, Spain | Clay | Iryna Shymanovich | (Spain) Yvonne Cavallé Reimers (Spain) Ángela Fita Boluda | 6–3, 6–4 |
| Win | 3–0 | Sep 2025 | Guadalajara 125 Open, Mexico | Hard | Iryna Shymanovich | Irina Khromacheva; Kamilla Rakhimova | 6–3, 6–4 |
| Win | 4–0 | Nov 2025 | Austin Challenger, United States | Hard | Iryna Shymanovich | (United States) Carmen Corley (United States) Ivana Corley | 6–3, 7–6^{(7–4)} |
| Win | 5–0 | Jan 2026 | Canberra International, Australia | Hard | Iryna Shymanovich | (Japan) Ena Shibahara; Vera Zvonareva | 6–7^{(9–11)}, 7–5, [10–8] |
| Win | 6–0 | Mar 2026 | Antalya Challenger, Turkey | Clay | Iryna Shymanovich | (Japan) Momoko Kobori (Thailand) Peangtarn Plipuech | 7–5, 6–1 |
| Win | 7–0 | Mar 2026 | Antalya Challenger 3, Turkey | Clay | Iryna Shymanovich | (Poland) Maja Chwalińska (Czech Republic) Jesika Malečková | 7–6^{(9–7)}, 6–4 |
| Win | 8–0 | May 2026 | İstanbul Open, Turkey | Clay | (Brazil) Laura Pigossi | (Czech Republic) Anastasia Dețiuc (Japan) Makoto Ninomiya | 6–4, 4–6, [10–7] |

== ITF Circuit finals ==
=== Singles: 2 (1 title, 1 runner-up) ===
| Legend W50 tournaments W15 tournaments | Finals by surface Hard (0–1) Clay (1–0) |

| Result | W–L | Date | Tournament | Tier | Surface | Opponent | Score |
|---|---|---|---|---|---|---|---|
| Loss | 0–1 | Jun 2022 | Rancho Santa Fe Open, US | W15 | Hard | (Australia) Talia Gibson | 6–7^{(4)}, 6–3, 6–7^{(5)} |
| Win | 1–1 | Mar 2024 | ITF São Paulo, Brazil | W50 | Clay | (Italy) Miriana Tona | 5–7, 6–0, 6–3 |

=== Doubles: 22 (16 titles, 6 runner-ups) ===
| Legend W100 tournaments W75 tournaments W40/50 tournaments W25/35 tournaments W15 tournaments | Finals by surface Hard (10–5) Clay (6–1) |

| Result | W–L | Date | Tournament | Tier | Surface | Partner | Opponents | Score |
|---|---|---|---|---|---|---|---|---|
| Win | 1–0 | Jul 2019 | ITF Cancún, Mexico | W15 | Hard | (United States) Hind Abdelouahid | (Brazil) Ingrid Martins (Brazil) Eduarda Piai | 7–6^{(0)}, 6–4 |
| Win | 2–0 | Jun 2022 | Rancho Santa Fe Open, United States | W15 | Hard | Veronika Miroshnichenko | (United States) Solymar Colling (Spain) Claudia Armenteras | 6–1, 6–3 |
| Loss | 2–1 | Jun 2022 | ITF San Diego, US | W15 | Hard | Veronika Miroshnichenko | (United States) Kimmi Hance (United States) Makenna Jones | 3–6, 3–6 |
| Win | 3–1 | Jul 2022 | Dallas Summer Series, US | W25 | Hard | Veronika Miroshnichenko | (United States) Jessie Aney (United States) Jessica Failla | 6–4, 6–7^{(9)}, [10–5] |
| Win | 4–1 | Oct 2022 | ITF Fort Worth, US | W25 | Hard | (Serbia) Katarina Kozarov | (United States) Allura Zamarripa (United States) Maribella Zamarripa | 6–4, 6–7^{(12)}, [10–7] |
| Win | 5–1 | Oct 2022 | Tyler Pro Challenge, US | W80 | Hard | (United States) Ashley Lahey | (United States) Jaeda Daniel (United Kingdom) Nell Miller | 7–5, 6–2 |
| Loss | 5–2 | Nov 2022 | ITF Champaign, US | W15 | Hard | Maria Kononova | (United States) Katherine Duong (United States) Megan Heuser | 0–6, 6–7^{(5)} |
| Win | 6–2 | May 2023 | ITF Kachreti, Georgia | W25 | Hard | (Canada) Stacey Fung | Aglaya Fedorova; Darya Shauha | 7–5, 7–5 |
| Win | 7–2 | May 2023 | ITF Kachreti, Georgia | W25 | Hard | Ekaterina Ovcharenko | Anastasia Zolotareva; Rada Zolotareva | 7–5, 6–3 |
| Win | 8–2 | June 2023 | ITF La Marsa, Tunisia | W40 | Hard | (China) Wei Sijia | (Ukraine) Kateryna Volodko (Japan) Hiroko Kuwata | 5–7, 6–4, [10–6] |
| Loss | 8–3 | Nov 2023 | ITF Austin, US | W25 | Hard | (United States) Ashley Lahey | (China) Han Jiangxue (China) Huang Yujia | 5–7, 6–2, [8–10] |
| Win | 9–3 | Jan 2024 | ITF Naples, US | W35 | Clay | (United States) Elvina Kalieva | (Netherlands) Isabelle Haverlag (Bulgaria) Lia Karatancheva | 6–0, 6–0 |
| Win | 10–3 | Feb 2024 | ITF Wesley Chapel, US | W35 | Clay | Maria Kononova | (Poland) Weronika Falkowska (Switzerland) Leonie Küng | 7–5, 6–1 |
| Win | 11–3 | Apr 2024 | Florianópolis Challenger, Brazil | W75 | Clay | Maria Kononova | (Serbia) Katarina Jokić (Brazil) Rebeca Pereira | 6–4, 6–3 |
| Loss | 11–4 | Apr 2024 | Charlottesville Open, US | W75 | Clay | Maria Kononova | (United Kingdom) Emily Appleton (United States) Quinn Gleason | 6–7^{(5)}, 1–6 |
| Win | 12–4 | Oct 2024 | Rancho Santa Fe Open, US | W75 | Hard | Maria Kononova | (United States) Haley Giavara (United States) Rasheeda McAdoo | 6–2, 7–6^{(4)} |
| Loss | 12–5 | Nov 2024 | ITF Boca Raton, US | W50 | Hard | Maria Kononova | (Spain) Alicia Herrero Liñana (United States) Anna Rogers | 2–6, 1–6 |
| Loss | 12–6 | Jan 2025 | ITF Pune, India | W75 | Hard | Iryna Shymanovich | Alevtina Ibragimova; Elena Pridankina | 2–6, 6–1, [8–10] |
| Win | 13–6 | Apr 2025 | Zephyrhills Open, US | W50 | Clay | Iryna Shymanovich | (United States) Maria Mateas (United States) Alana Smith | 6–4, 6–1 |
| Win | 14–6 | Apr 2025 | Charlottesville Open, US | W100 | Hard | Iryna Shymanovich | (Canada) Kayla Cross (Australia) Petra Hule | 7–5, 7–5 |
| Win | 15–6 | Apr 2025 | Bonita Springs Championship, US | W100 | Clay | Iryna Shymanovich | (United States) Makenna Jones (United States) Angela Kulikov | 6–2, 6–2 |
| Win | 16–6 | Sep 2025 | Templeton Open, US | W75 | Hard | Iryna Shymanovich | (United States) Usue Maitane Arconada (Slovakia) Viktória Hrunčáková | 6–2, 7–5 |
