= Katarina Kozarov =

Serbian tennis player (born 1998)

- Country (sports): Serbia
- Born: 1 May 1998 (age 28) Novi Sad, Serbia
- College: Furman Paladins
- Prize money: $53,538

Singles
- Career record: 123–93
- Career titles: 2 ITF
- Highest ranking: No. 302 (6 November 2023)

Doubles
- Career record: 57–27
- Career titles: 4 ITF
- Highest ranking: No. 288 (9 October 2023)

Team competitions
- BJK Cup: 3–5

Katarina Kozarov (born 1 May 1998) is a former tennis player from Serbia.

Kozarov has a career-high singles ranking by the WTA of 302, achieved on 6 November 2023, and a career-high WTA doubles ranking of 288, reached on 9 October 2023.

She played college tennis at Furman University.

Playing for Serbia Billie Jean King Cup team, Kozarov has a win–loss record of 3–5.

== ITF Circuit finals ==
=== Singles: 4 (2 titles, 2 runner-ups) ===
Legend W25 tournaments W15 tournaments	Finals by surface Hard (2–2)

Result	W–L	Date	Tournament	Tier	Surface	Opponent	Score
Loss	0–1	Jun 2021	ITF Monastir, Tunisia	W15	Hard	(Colombia) Mell Reasco	6–7^{(7)}, 6–3, 4–6
Win	1–1	Jun 2022	ITF Colorado Springs, US	W15	Hard	(Russia) Veronika Miroshnichenko	6–3, 6–4
Win	2–1	Jun 2023	ITF Colorado Springs, US	W25	Hard	(United States) Allie Kiick	6–3, 6–1
Loss	2–2	Sep 2023	ITF Ceuta, Spain	W25	Hard	(Belarus) Aliona Falei	1–6, 4–6

=== Doubles: 10 (4 titles, 6 runner-ups) ===
Legend W60 tournaments W25/35 tournaments W15 tournaments	Finals by surface Hard (4–5) Carpet (0–1)

Result	W–L	Date	Tournament	Tier	Surface	Partner	Opponents	Score
Loss	0–1	Feb 2020	ITF Cancun, Mexico	W15	Hard	(United States) Kendra Bunch	(Argentina) María Lourdes Carlé (Brazil) Thaisa Grana Pedretti	w/o
Win	1–1	Jul 2021	ITF Monastir, Tunisia	W15	Hard	(United States) Lauren Proctor	(United States) Anastasia Nefedova (Italy) Angelica Raggi	6–1, 3–6, [10–5]
Loss	1–2	Jul 2022	ITF Saskatoon, Canada	W25	Hard	(United States) Kendra Bunch	(Canada) Kayla Cross (Canada) Marina Stakusic	3–6, 6–7^{(4)}
Win	2–2	Sep 2022	ITF Lubbock, US	W15	Hard	(Russia) Veronika Miroshnichenko	(Chinese Taipei) Hsu Chieh-yu (Russia) Maria Kononova	6–1, 4–6, [11–9]
Loss	2–3	Oct 2022	Las Vegas Open, US	W60	Hard (i)	(Russia) Veronika Miroshnichenko	(United States) Carmen Corley (United States) Ivana Corley	2–6, 0–6
Win	3–3	Oct 2022	ITF Fort Worth, US	W25	Hard	(Russia) Maria Kozyreva	(United States) Allura Zamarripa (United States) Maribella Zamarripa	6–4, 6–7^{(12)}, [10–7]
Win	4–3	Jun 2023	ITF Yecla, Spain	W25	Hard	(Spain) Georgina García Pérez	(Italy) Nicole Fossa Huergo (United Kingdom) Matilda Mutavdzic	6–3, 6–4
Loss	4–4	Sep 2023	ITF Ceuta, Spain	W25	Hard	(United States) Madison Sieg	(Spain) Yvonne Cavallé Reimers (Spain) Ángela Fita Boluda	6–7^{(0)}, 3–6
Loss	4–5	Nov 2023	ITF Ortisei, Italy	W25	Hard (i)	(Netherlands) Indy de Vroome	(Italy) Anastasia Abbagnato (Latvia) Kamilla Bartone	4–6, 2–6
Loss	4–6	Mar 2024	ITF Solarino, Italy	W35	Carpet	(Russia) Veronika Miroshnichenko	(Poland) Martyna Kubka (Chinese Taipei) Tsao Chia-yi	4–6, 2–6
