= Tyler Pro Challenge =

Tyler Pro Challenger

ITF Women's Tour
- Event name: Christus Health Pro Challenge (2021–); Bellatorum Resources Pro Classic (2020); RBC Pro Challenge (2017–19)
- Location: Tyler, Texas, United States
- Venue: Tyler Athletic and Swim Club
- Category: ITF Women's Circuit
- Surface: Hard
- Draw: 32S/32Q/16D
- Prize money: $100,000
- Website: www.christusprochallenge.com

The Tyler Pro Challenge (currently known as the Christus Health Pro Challenge for sponsorship purposes) is a tournament for professional female tennis players played on outdoor hard courts. The event is classified as a $100,000 ITF Women's Circuit tournament and has been held in Tyler, Texas, United States, since 2017.

== Past finals ==
=== Singles ===
Year	Champion	Runner-up	Score
2025	(Croatia) Petra Marcinko	(United States) Mary Stoiana	6–3, 6–0
2024	(Mexico) Renata Zarazúa	(United States) Iva Jovic	6–4, 6–2
2023	(United States) Emma Navarro	(United States) Kayla Day	6–3, 6–4
2022	(United States) Taylor Townsend	(China) Yuan Yue	6–4, 6–2
2021	(Japan) Misaki Doi	(United Kingdom) Harriet Dart	7–6^{(7–5)}, 6–2
2020	(United States) Ann Li	(Ukraine) Marta Kostyuk	7–5, 1–6, 6–3
2019	(Luxembourg) Mandy Minella	(United States) Alexa Glatch	6–4, 6–4
2018	(United States) Whitney Osuigwe	(Brazil) Beatriz Haddad Maia	6–3, 6–4
2017	(United States) Kristie Ahn	(United States) Danielle Collins	6–4, 6–4

=== Doubles ===
Year	Champions	Runners-up	Score
2025	(Poland) Weronika Falkowska (United States) Dalayna Hewitt	(United States) Eryn Cayetano (United States) Victoria Hu	6–2, 6–3.
2024	(United States) Clervie Ngounoue (Australia) Alexandra Osborne	(United States) Mary Lewis (United States) Brandy Walker	6–2, 6–3
2023	(United Kingdom) Amelia Rajecki (United States) Abigail Rencheli	(United States) Anna Rogers (United States) Alana Smith	7–5, 4–6, [16–14]
2022	Maria Kozyreva (United States) Ashley Lahey	(United States) Jaeda Daniel (United Kingdom) Nell Miller	7–5, 6–2
2021	(Mexico) Giuliana Olmos (Mexico) Marcela Zacarías	(Japan) Misaki Doi (Poland) Katarzyna Kawa	7–5, 1–6, [10–5]
2020	(United States) Allura Zamarripa (United States) Maribella Zamarripa	(Poland) Paula Kania-Choduń (Poland) Katarzyna Piter	6–3, 5–7, [11–9]
2019	(Indonesia) Beatrice Gumulya (Indonesia) Jessy Rompies	(Chinese Taipei) Hsu Chieh-yu (Mexico) Marcela Zacarías	6–2, 6–3
2018	(United States) Nicole Gibbs (United States) Asia Muhammad	(United States) Desirae Krawczyk (Mexico) Giuliana Olmos	3–6, 6–3, [14–12]
2017	(United States) Jessica Pegula (United States) Taylor Townsend	(United States) Jamie Loeb (Sweden) Rebecca Peterson	6–4, 6–1
