= Maribella Zamarripa =

American tennis player (born 2002)

- Country (sports): United States
- Residence: St. Helena, California
- Born: August 15, 2002 (age 23) Hawaii, U.S.
- Plays: Right-handed (two-handed backhand)
- Prize money: $51,096

Singles
- Career record: 56–70
- Career titles: 0
- Highest ranking: No. 757 (June 17, 2024)
- Current ranking: No. 1108 (May 18, 2026)

Doubles
- Career record: 136–82
- Career titles: 16 ITF
- Highest ranking: No. 185 (October 6, 2025)
- Current ranking: No. 268 (May 18, 2026)
- Last updated on: 22 May 2026.

Maribella Zamarripa (born August 15, 2002) is an American tennis player.

== Career ==
She has a career-high WTA doubles ranking of No. 185, achieved on 6 October 2025. She has won 16 doubles titles on the ITF Circuit.

Zamarripa won her biggest title to date at the 2020 Bellatorum Resources Pro Classic in the doubles event, partnering her twin sister Allura, defeating Paula Kania-Choduń and Katarzyna Piter in the final.

Partnering Kayla Cross, she won the title at the W75 2024 Calgary Challenger, defeating Robin Anderson and Dalayna Hewitt in a champions tiebreak in the final.

== ITF Circuit finals ==
=== Doubles: 27 (16 titles, 11 runner-ups) ===
Legend
W80 tournaments
W60/75 tournaments
W50 tournaments
W25/35 tournaments
W15 tournaments

Result	W–L	Date	Tournament	Tier	Surface	Partner	Opponents	Score
Loss	0–1	Sep 2018	ITF Hilton Head, United States	W15	Clay	(United States) Allura Zamarripa	(Chile) Bárbara Gatica (Brazil) Rebeca Pereira	6–7^{(2)}, 6–3, [9–11]
Win	1–1	Dec 2018	ITF Bogotá, Colombia	W15	Clay	(United States) Allura Zamarripa	(Colombia) María Paulina Pérez (Colombia) Paula Andrea Pérez	7–5, 6–4
Win	2–1	Jun 2019	ITF Wesley Chapel, United States	W15	Clay	(United States) Allura Zamarripa	(United States) Kylie Collins (United States) Sofia Sewing	3–6, 6–4, [13–11]
Win	3–1	Jun 2019	ITF Orlando, United States	W15	Clay	(United States) Allura Zamarripa	(United States) Kimmi Hance (United States) Ashlyn Krueger	6–3, 6–1
Loss	3–2	Sep 2018	ITF Cancún, Mexico	W15	Hard	(United States) Allura Zamarripa	(Israel) Maya Tahan (Netherlands) Eva Vedder	4–6, 6–4, [2–10]
Win	4–2	Nov 2020	Tyler Pro Classic, United States	W80	Hard	(United States) Allura Zamarripa	(Poland) Paula Kania-Choduń (Poland) Katarzyna Piter	6–3, 5–7, [11–9]
Loss	4–3	Jun 2022	ITF Sumter, United States	W25	Hard	(United States) Allura Zamarripa	(United States) Kylie Collins (United States) Peyton Stearns	3–6, 7–5, [7–10]
Win	5–3	Jun 2022	ITF Wichita, United States	W25	Hard	(United States) Allura Zamarripa	(United States) Carolyn Ansari (Canada) Ariana Arseneault	6–4, 6–2
Loss	5–4	Sep 2022	Berkeley Tennis Challenge, United States	W60	Hard	(United States) Allura Zamarripa	(United States) Elvina Kalieva (United States) Peyton Stearns	6–7, 6–7
Win	6–4	Oct 2022	ITF Florence, United States	W25	Hard	(United States) Allura Zamarripa	(United States) Samantha Crawford (United States) Clervie Ngounoue	6–3, 6–4
Loss	6–5	Oct 2022	ITF Fort Worth, United States	W25	Hard	(United States) Allura Zamarripa	(Serbia) Katarina Kozarov (Russia) Maria Kozyreva	4–6, 7–6^{(12)}, [7–10]
Loss	6–6	Apr 2023	ITF Jackson, United States	W25	Clay	(United States) Allura Zamarripa	(United States) Jaeda Daniel (United States) McCartney Kessler	6–1, 1–6, [5–10]
Win	7–6	Jun 2023	ITF Colorado Springs, United States	W25	Hard	(United States) Eryn Cayetano	(United States) Lauren Friedman; Alina Shcherbinina	6–4, 6–2
Loss	7–7	Oct 2023	ITF Edmonton, Canada	W25	Hard (i)	(United States) Allura Zamarripa	(Canada) Kayla Cross (United States) Liv Hovde	6–4, 4–6, [7–10]
Win	8–7	Jan 2024	Vero Beach Open, United States	W75+H	Clay	(United States) Allura Zamarripa	(United States) Hailey Baptiste (United States) Whitney Osuigwe	6–3, 3–6, [10–4]
Loss	8–8	Apr 2024	ITF Boca Raton, United States	W35	Clay	(United States) Rasheeda McAdoo	(United States) Robin Anderson (Australia) Elysia Bolton	6–3, 4–6, [8–10]
Loss	8–9	Aug 2024	Saskatoon Challenger, Canada	W35	Hard	(Japan) Hiroko Kuwata	(Canada) Ariana Arseneault (Canada) Mia Kupres	4–6, 3–6
Win	9–9	Sep 2024	ITF Monastir, Tunisia	W15	Hard	(United States) Eryn Cayetano	(Poland) Xenia Bandurowska (Kazakhstan) Sandugash Kenzhibayeva	6–4, 6–2
Win	10–9	Oct 2024	ITF Edmonton, Canada	W35	Hard (i)	(Canada) Kayla Cross	(United States) Jessica Failla (United States) Anna Rogers	6–3, 6–1
Win	11–9	Oct 2024	Calgary Challenger, Canada	W75	Hard (i)	(Canada) Kayla Cross	(United States) Robin Anderson (United States) Dalayna Hewitt	6–7^{(3)}, 7–5, [12–10]
Win	12–9	Oct 2024	ITF Norman, United States	W35	Hard (i)	(United States) Jessica Failla	(United States) Makenna Jones (South Korea) Park So-hyun	3–6, 6–2, [10–5]
Win	13–9	Jan 2025	ITF Naples, United States	W35	Clay	(United States) Allura Zamarripa	(France) Julie Belgraver (Netherlands) Jasmijn Gimbrère	7–5, 6–1
Loss	13–10	Mar 2025	ITF Santo Domingo, Dominican Republic	W50	Hard	(United States) Carmen Corley	(United Kingdom) Holly Hutchinson (United Kingdom) Ella McDonald	1–6, 4–6
Win	14–10	Mar 2025	ITF Jackson, United States	W35	Clay	(Spain) Alicia Herrero Liñana	(Italy) Diletta Cherubini (United States) Victoria Osuigwe	6–0, 6–2
Win	15–10	May 2025	ITF Orlando, United States	W35	Clay	(United States) Allura Zamarripa	(Switzerland) Jenny Dürst (Canada) Dasha Plekhanova	6–3, 6–1
Loss	15–11	Nov 2025	ITF Orlando, United States	W35	Clay	(United States) Allura Zamarripa	(Kenya) Angella Okutoyi (Italy) Francesca Pace	6–3, 4–6, [12–14]
Win	16–11	Jan 2026	Vero Beach Open, United States	W75	Clay	(United States) Allura Zamarripa	(Argentina) Jazmín Ortenzi (United States) Anna Rogers	walkover
