= Allura Zamarripa =

American tennis player (born 2002)

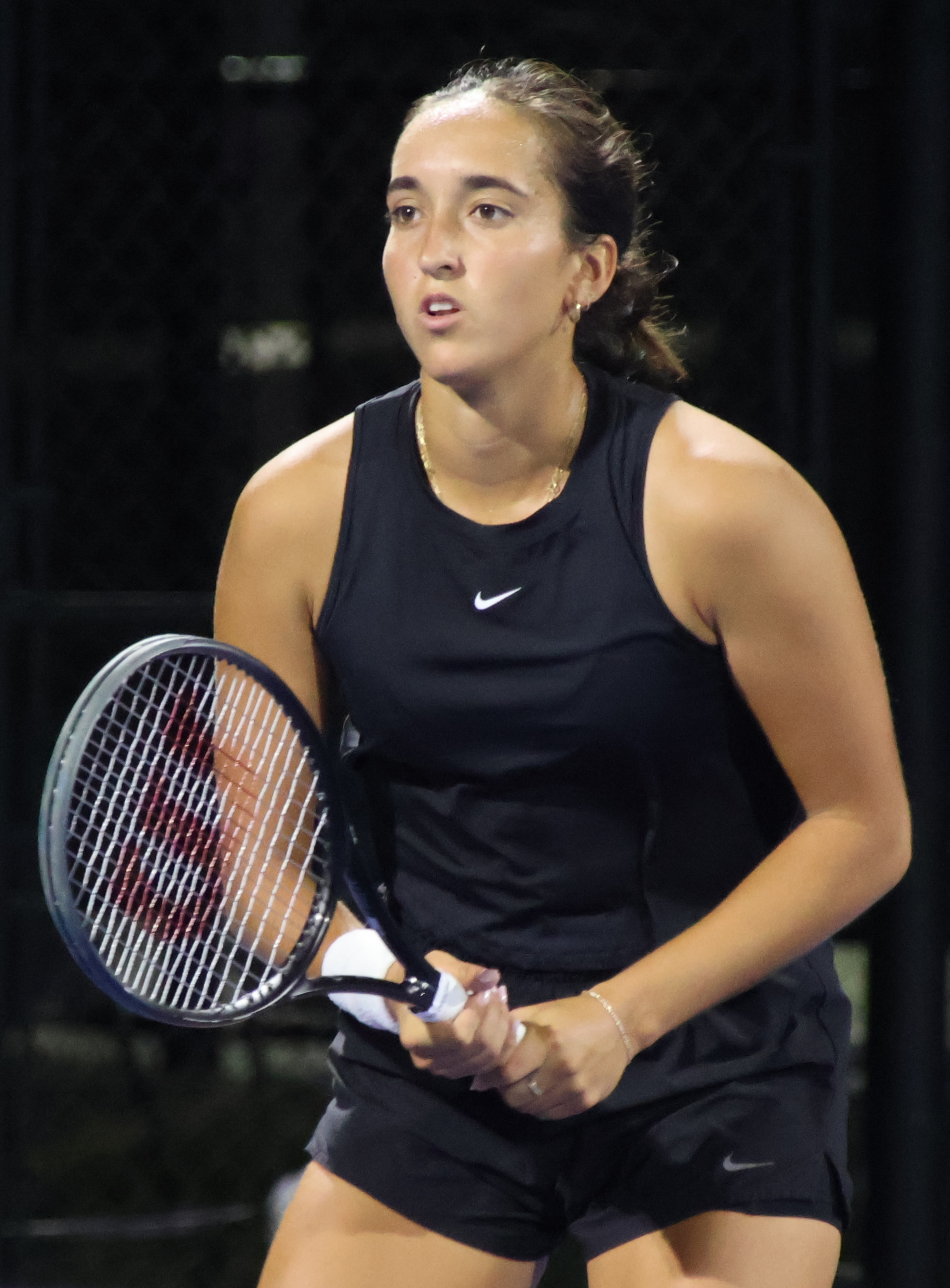
- Zamarripa in 2026
- Country (sports): United States
- Born: August 15, 2002 (age 24) Hawaii, United States
- Plays: Left-handed (two-handed backhand)
- Prize money: $81,699

Singles
- Career record: 73–64
- Career titles: 1 ITF
- Highest ranking: No. 589 (June 12, 2023)
- Current ranking: No. 790 (November 9, 2026)

Doubles
- Career record: 135–77
- Career titles: 1 WTA 125, 14 ITF
- Highest ranking: No. 78 (November 9, 2026)
- Current ranking: No. 78 (November 9, 2026)
- Last updated on: November 9, 2026.

Allura Zamarripa (born August 15, 2002) is an American tennis player. She has a career-high WTA doubles ranking of 78, achieved on November 9, 2026. Zamarripa has won one WTA 125 doubles title as well as one singles title and fourteen doubles titles on the ITF World Tennis Tour.

== Career ==
Partnering with Anna Rogers, Zamarripa reached her first WTA Tour final in doubles at the 2026 SP Open, losing to top seeds Gabriela Dabrowski and Luisa Stefani.

Again teaming with Rogers, she won her first WTA 125 title in doubles at the 2026 Cali Open, defeating María Lourdes Carlé and Laura Pigossi in the final.

== WTA Tour finals ==
=== Doubles: 1 (runner-up) ===
Legend WTA 250 (0–1)	Finals by surface Hard (0–1)

Result	Date	Tournament	Tier	Surface	Partner	Opponents	Score
Loss	Sep 2026	SP Open, Brazil	WTA 250	Hard	(United States) Anna Rogers	(Canada) Gabriela Dabrowski (Brazil) Luisa Stefani	3–6, 6–3, [7–10]

== WTA 125 finals ==
=== Doubles: 2 (1 title, 1 runner-up) ===
Result	W–L	Date	Tournament	Surface	Partner	Opponents	Score
Loss	0–1	Jul 2026	Vancouver Open, Canada	Hard	(United States) Anna Rogers	(United States) Caroline Dolehide (Canada) Alexandra Vagramov	1–6, 6–3, [6–10]
Win	1–1	Nov 2026	Cali Open, Colombia	Clay	(United States) Anna Rogers	(Argentina) María Lourdes Carlé (Brazil) Laura Pigossi	7–6^{(7–5)}, 7–5

== ITF Circuit finals ==
=== Singles: 1 (title) ===
Legend
W15 tournaments

Result	Date	Tournament	Tier	Surface	Opponent	Score
Win	Dec 2018	ITF Bogotá, Colombia	W15	Clay	(Mexico) Andrea Renée Villarreal	6–3, 6–3

=== Doubles: 26 (14 titles, 12 runner-ups) ===
Legend
W100 tournaments
W80 tournaments
W60/75 tournaments
W25/35 tournaments
W15 tournaments

Result	W–L	Date	Tournament	Tier	Surface	Partner	Opponents	Score
Loss	0–1	Sep 2018	ITF Hilton Head, US	W15	Clay	(United States) Maribella Zamarripa	(Chile) Bárbara Gatica (Brazil) Rebeca Pereira	6–7^{(2)}, 6–3, [9–11]
Win	1–1	Dec 2018	ITF Bogotá, Colombia	W15	Clay	(United States) Maribella Zamarripa	(Colombia) María Paulina Pérez (Colombia) Paula Andrea Pérez	7–5, 6–4
Win	2–1	Jun 2019	ITF Wesley Chapel, US	W15	Clay	(United States) Maribella Zamarripa	(United States) Kylie Collins (United States) Sofia Sewing	3–6, 6–4, [13–11]
Win	3–1	Jun 2019	ITF Orlando, US	W15	Clay	(United States) Maribella Zamarripa	(United States) Kimmi Hance (United States) Ashlyn Krueger	6–3, 6–1
Loss	3–2	Sep 2018	ITF Cancún, Mexico	W15	Hard	(United States) Maribella Zamarripa	(Israel) Maya Tahan (Netherlands) Eva Vedder	4–6, 6–4, [2–10]
Win	4–2	Nov 2020	Tyler Pro Classic, US	W80	Hard	(United States) Maribella Zamarripa	(Poland) Paula Kania-Choduń (Poland) Katarzyna Piter	6–3, 5–7, [11–9]
Loss	4–3	Jun 2022	ITF Sumter, US	W25	Hard	(United States) Maribella Zamarripa	(United States) Kylie Collins (United States) Peyton Stearns	3–6, 7–5, [7–10]
Win	5–3	Jun 2022	ITF Wichita, US	W25	Hard	(United States) Maribella Zamarripa	(United States) Carolyn Ansari (Canada) Ariana Arseneault	6–4, 6–2
Loss	5–4	Sep 2022	Berkeley Challenge, US	W60	Hard	(United States) Maribella Zamarripa	(United States) Elvina Kalieva (United States) Peyton Stearns	6–7, 6–7
Win	6–4	Oct 2022	ITF Florence, US	W25	Hard	(United States) Maribella Zamarripa	(United States) Samantha Crawford (United States) Clervie Ngounoue	6–3, 6–4
Loss	6–5	Oct 2022	ITF Fort Worth, US	W25	Hard	(United States) Maribella Zamarripa	(Serbia) Katarina Kozarov (Russia) Maria Kozyreva	4–6, 7–6^{(12)}, [7–10]
Loss	6–6	Apr 2023	ITF Jackson, US	W25	Clay	(United States) Maribella Zamarripa	(United States) Jaeda Daniel (United States) McCartney Kessler	6–1, 1–6, [5–10]
Loss	6–7	Oct 2023	ITF Edmonton, Canada	W25	Hard (i)	(United States) Maribella Zamarripa	(Canada) Kayla Cross (United States) Liv Hovde	6–4, 4–6, [7–10]
Win	7–7	Jan 2024	Vero Beach Open, US	W75+H	Clay	(United States) Maribella Zamarripa	(United States) Hailey Baptiste (United States) Whitney Osuigwe	6–3, 3–6, [10–4]
Win	8–7	Jan 2025	ITF Naples, US	W35	Clay	(United States) Maribella Zamarripa	(France) Julie Belgraver (Netherlands) Jasmijn Gimbrère	7–5, 6–1
Loss	8–8	May 2025	ITF Boca Raton, US	W35	Clay	(United States) Kayla Day	(United States) Fiona Crawley (United States) Alana Smith	4–6, 2–6
Win	9–8	May 2025	ITF Orlando, US	W35	Clay	(United States) Maribella Zamarripa	(Switzerland) Jenny Dürst (Canada) Dasha Plekhanova	6–3, 6–1
Loss	9–9	Nov 2025	ITF Orlando, US	W35	Clay	(United States) Maribella Zamarripa	(Kenya) Angella Okutoyi (Italy) Francesca Pace	6–3, 4–6, [12–14]
Win	10–9	Jan 2026	Vero Beach Open, US	W75	Clay	(United States) Maribella Zamarripa	(Argentina) Jazmín Ortenzi (United States) Anna Rogers	w/o
Loss	10–10	Apr 2026	Charlottesville Open, US	W100	Clay	(United States) Eryn Cayetano	(Spain) Alicia Herrero Liñana (United States) Anna Rogers	1–6, 3–6
Win	11–10	May 2026	ITF Indian Harbour Beach, US	W100	Clay	(United States) Anna Rogers	(Estonia) Ingrid Neel (United States) Abigail Rencheli	6–3, 6–0
Loss	11–11	Jun 2026	Palmetto Pro Open, US	W100	Hard	(United States) Anna Rogers	(United States) Catherine Harrison (Australia) Alexandra Osborne	4–6, 6–4, [7–10]
Loss	11–12	Jun 2026	Macha Lake Open, Czech Republic	W75	Clay	(United States) Hibah Shaikh	(Czech Republic) Alena Kovačková (Czech Republic) Jana Kovačková	4–6, 1–6
Win	12–12	Sep 2026	Central Coast Pro Tennis Open, US	W100	Hard	(United States) Savannah Broadus	(United States) Whitney Osuigwe (United States) Akasha Urhobo	7–5, 6–2
Win	13–12	Oct 2026	Edmond Open, US	W100	Hard	(Spain) Alicia Herrero Liñana	(United Kingdom) Sofia Johnson (United States) Malaika Rapolu	6–1, 6–2
Win	14–12	Oct 2026	Tyler Pro Challenge, US	W100	Hard	(United States) Savannah Broadus	(United States) Kylie Collins (United States) Kristina Penickova	7–6^{(5)}, 6–0
