= 2023 Christus Health Pro Challenge – Doubles =

Doubles
- 2023 Christus Health Pro Challenge

Final
- Champions: (United Kingdom) Amelia Rajecki (United States) Abigail Rencheli
- Runners-up: (United States) Anna Rogers (United States) Alana Smith
- Score: 7–5, 4–6, [16–14]

Events
| Singles | Doubles |
| ← 2022 · | Tyler Pro Challenge | · 2024 → |

Maria Kozyreva and Ashley Lahey were the defending champions however, only Kozyreva chose to defend her title. She partnered alongside Elvina Kalieva but lost in the semifinals to Anna Rogers and Alana Smith.

Amelia Rajecki and Abigail Rencheli won the title, defeating Rogers and Smith in the final, 7–5, 4–6, [16–14].

== Seeds ==
1. (United States) Sophie Chang / (United States) Quinn Gleason (quarterfinals)
2. (United States) Anna Rogers / (United States) Alana Smith (final)
3. (United States) Catherine Harrison / (United States) McCartney Kessler (first round, withdrew)
4. (United States) Elvina Kalieva / Maria Kozyreva (semifinals)

== Draw ==
=== Key ===
- Q = Qualifier
- WC = Wild card
- LL = Lucky loser
- Alt = Alternate
- SE = Special exempt
- PR = Protected ranking
- ITF = ITF entry
- JE = Junior exempt
- w/o = Walkover
- r = Retired
- d = Defaulted
- SR = Special ranking

First round
1 | (United States) S Chang (United States) Q Gleason | 7 | 7
(United States) K Day (Australia) A Osborne | 5 | 5
(United Kingdom) A Rajecki (United States) A Rencheli | 7 | 6
WC | (United States) C Henderson (United States) M Schmidt | 5 | 1
3 | (United States) C Harrison (United States) M Kessler
(United States) J Failla (United States) K Hui | w/o
(Morocco) Y Kabbaj (United States) R Newborn | 6 | 6
WC | (Greece) Z Spyrou (Hong Kong) Y-c Wai | 0 | 1
(Chinese Taipei) C-y Hsu (India) S Yamalapalli | 1 | 6 | [10]
(Bulgaria) L Karatancheva; M Kononova | 6 | 3 | [6]
(United States) A Akli (Ukraine) A Sahdiieva | 1 | 6^{5}
4 | (United States) E Kalieva; M Kozyreva | 6 | 7^{7}
(United States) E Cayetano (United States) V Hu | 7 | 6
(Greece) M Matoula (Slovakia) M Okáľová | 5 | 4
WC | (Spain) M Aristegui (New Zealand) J Otway | 7^{9} | 1 | [5]
2 | (United States) A Rogers (United States) A Smith | 6^{7} | 6 | [10]

Quarterfinals
1 | (United States) S Chang (United States) Q Gleason | 5 | 4
(United Kingdom) A Rajecki (United States) A Rencheli | 7 | 6
(United States) J Failla (United States) K Hui | 6 | 6
(Morocco) Y Kabbaj (United States) R Newborn | 4 | 4
(Chinese Taipei) C-y Hsu (India) S Yamalapalli | 5 | 3
4 | (United States) E Kalieva; M Kozyreva | 7 | 6
(United States) E Cayetano (United States) V Hu | 3 | 4
2 | (United States) A Rogers (United States) A Smith | 6 | 6

Semifinals
(United Kingdom) A Rajecki (United States) A Rencheli | 6 | 6
(United States) J Failla (United States) K Hui | 2 | 2
4 | (United States) E Kalieva; M Kozyreva | 6^{4} | 6 | [5]
2 | (United States) A Rogers (United States) A Smith | 7^{7} | 2 | [10]

Final
(United Kingdom) A Rajecki (United States) A Rencheli | 7 | 4 | [16]
2 | (United States) A Rogers (United States) A Smith | 5 | 6 | [14]
