= 2023 Engie Open Feira de Santana – Doubles =

Doubles
- 2023 Engie Open Feira de Santana

Final
- Champions: (France) Léolia Jeanjean (Ukraine) Valeriya Strakhova
- Runners-up: (United States) Haley Giavara (United States) Abigail Rencheli
- Score: 7–5, 6–4

Events
Singles	Doubles
Engie Open Feira de Santana	· 2024 →

This was the first edition of the tournament.

Léolia Jeanjean and Valeriya Strakhova won the title, defeating Haley Giavara and Abigail Rencheli in the final, 7–5, 6–4.

== Seeds ==
1. (United States) Asia Muhammad / (United Kingdom) Eden Silva (first round)
2. (Colombia) María Herazo González / (Bolivia) Noelia Zeballos (semifinals)
3. (Brazil) Carolina Alves / (France) Kristina Mladenovic (quarterfinals, withdrew)
4. (France) Léolia Jeanjean / (Ukraine) Valeriya Strakhova (champions)

== Draw ==
=== Key ===
- Q = Qualifier
- WC = Wild card
- LL = Lucky loser
- Alt = Alternate
- SE = Special exempt
- PR = Protected ranking
- ITF = ITF entry
- JE = Junior exempt
- w/o = Walkover
- r = Retired
- d = Defaulted
- SR = Special ranking

First round
1	(United States) A Muhammad (United Kingdom) E Silva	4	6^{3}
(Brazil) A Candiotto (Brazil) R Pereira	6	7^{7}
(Canada) C Brace (United States) G Price	3	6	[8]
(United States) H Giavara (United States) A Rencheli	6	2	[10]
3	(Brazil) C Alves (France) K Mladenovic	7	7^{7}
WC	(Brazil) C Bohrer Martins (Brazil) P Rivoli	5	6^{1}
(Brazil) H Bueno (Brazil) MC Ferreira Turchetto	6	4	[10]
(Brazil) B Bernardes (Brazil) M Gomes Sorrilha	2	6	[7]
WC	(Brazil) O Carneiro (Brazil) ML Oliveira	2	6^{5}
(Germany) J Jebawy (Colombia) Y Monroy	6	7^{7}
(Brazil) L Fullana (Brazil) G Gulin	4	1
4	(France) L Jeanjean (Ukraine) V Strakhova	6	6
(Brazil) L Garcia Vidal (Brazil) C Melleiro	6	6
(Brazil) P Ueno Dalmonico (Brazil) C Xavier Laydner	2	4
WC	(Brazil) I Andreola (Brazil) L Paiva	0	2
2	(Colombia) M Herazo González (Bolivia) N Zeballos	6	6

Quarterfinals
(Brazil) A Candiotto (Brazil) R Pereira	2	7	[7]
(United States) H Giavara (United States) A Rencheli	6	5	[10]
3	(Brazil) C Alves (France) K Mladenovic
(Brazil) H Bueno (Brazil) MC Ferreira Turchetto	w/o
(Germany) J Jebawy (Colombia) Y Monroy	0	4
4	(France) L Jeanjean (Ukraine) V Strakhova	6	6
(Brazil) L Garcia Vidal (Brazil) C Melleiro	0	2
2	(Colombia) M Herazo González (Bolivia) N Zeballos	6	6

Semifinals
(United States) H Giavara (United States) A Rencheli	6	6
(Brazil) H Bueno (Brazil) MC Ferreira Turchetto	3	1
4	(France) L Jeanjean (Ukraine) V Strakhova	6	6
2	(Colombia) M Herazo González (Bolivia) N Zeballos	3	4

Final
(United States) H Giavara (United States) A Rencheli	5	4
4	(France) L Jeanjean (Ukraine) V Strakhova	7	6
