= Engie (disambiguation) =

Engie SA is a French multinational utility company.

Engie may also refer to:

- Engie Open de Biarritz, a professional tennis tournament held in Biarritz, France
- Engie Open Feira de Santana, a professional tennis tournament held in Brazil
- Engie Open Brasília, a professional tennis tournament held in Brazil
- Engie Mitre, a Panamanian footballer
- Engie Benjy, a British stop motion animated pre-school children's show
- The Engineer, one of nine playable classes in Team Fortress 2
- Engie Australia, Australian energy retailer
