= 2023 Engie Open Feira de Santana – Singles =

Singles
- 2023 Engie Open Feira de Santana

Final
- Champion: (Brazil) Laura Pigossi
- Runner-up: Jana Kolodynska
- Score: 6–1, 6–4

Events
Singles	Doubles
Engie Open Feira de Santana	· 2024 →

This was the first edition of the tournament.

Laura Pigossi won the title, defeating Jana Kolodynska in the final, 6–1, 6–4.

== Seeds ==
1. (Brazil) Laura Pigossi (champion)
2. (France) Léolia Jeanjean (quarterfinals)
3. (France) Kristina Mladenovic (second round)
4. (Brazil) Carolina Alves (first round)
5. (Brazil) Gabriela Cé (first round)
6. (Ukraine) Valeriya Strakhova (quarterfinals)
7. (United States) Asia Muhammad (second round)
8. Jana Kolodynska (final)

== Draw ==
=== Key ===
- Q = Qualifier
- WC = Wild card
- LL = Lucky loser
- Alt = Alternate
- SE = Special exempt
- PR = Protected ranking
- ITF = ITF entry
- JE = Junior exempt
- w/o = Walkover
- r = Retired
- d = Defaulted
- SR = Special ranking

=== Finals ===
Semifinals
1	(Brazil) Laura Pigossi	6	6
(United States) Haley Giavara	4	1
(United Kingdom) Eden Silva	3	3
8	Jana Kolodynska	6	6

Final
1	(Brazil) Laura Pigossi	6	6
8	Jana Kolodynska	1	4

=== Top half ===
First round
1	(Brazil) L Pigossi	6	6
(Germany) J Jebawy	1	1
(Colombia) Y Monroy	6	6
WC	(Brazil) C Bohrer Martins	4	1
(Brazil) A Candiotto	6	6
WC	(Brazil) L Paiva	0	3
Q	(Brazil) P Ueno Dalmonico	0	0
6	(Ukraine) V Strakhova	6	6
4	(Brazil) C Alves	2	1
(United States) H Giavara	6	6
Q	(Brazil) MC Ferreira Turchetto	6^{7}	3
(Bolivia) N Zeballos	7^{9}	6
Q	(United States) V Lepchenko	6	6
(Colombia) M Herazo González	2	3
Q	(Brazil) L Garcia Vidal	0	0
7	(United States) A Muhammad	6	6

Second round
1	(Brazil) L Pigossi	6	6
(Colombia) Y Monroy	1	1
(Brazil) A Candiotto	0	1
6	(Ukraine) V Strakhova	6	6
(United States) H Giavara	6^{4}	7	6
(Bolivia) N Zeballos	7^{7}	5	1
Q	(United States) V Lepchenko	6	6
7	(United States) A Muhammad	4	4

Quarterfinals
1	(Brazil) L Pigossi	6	6
6	(Ukraine) V Strakhova	4	3
(United States) H Giavara	7	6
Q	(United States) V Lepchenko	5	2

Semifinals
1	(Brazil) L Pigossi	6	6
(United States) H Giavara	4	1

=== Bottom half ===
First round
5	(Brazil) G Cé	4	0
(United States) R Kingsley	6	6
(Greece) M Laki	6	6
WC	(Brazil) O Carneiro	0	0
Q	(Brazil) R Pereira	0	1
(United Kingdom) E Silva	6	6
(United States) G Price	1	5
3	(France) K Mladenovic	6	7
8	J Kolodynska	4	6	6
(Canada) C Brace	6	4	2
(Serbia) K Kozarov	6	7^{7}
Q	(United States) A Rencheli	3	6^{3}
WC	(Brazil) P Rivoli	2	3
Q	(Paraguay) AP Neffa de los Ríos	6	6
Q	(United States) Z Hitt	0	3
2	(France) L Jeanjean	6	6

Second round
(United States) R Kingsley	7^{7}	7^{8}
(Greece) M Laki	6^{5}	6^{6}
(United Kingdom) E Silva	4	6	6
3	(France) K Mladenovic	6	4	3
8	J Kolodynska	6^{4}	6	6
(Serbia) K Kozarov	7^{7}	3	3
Q	(Paraguay) AP Neffa de los Ríos	6^{4}	6	6^{3}
2	(France) L Jeanjean	7^{7}	2	7^{7}

Quarterfinals
(United States) R Kingsley	3	2
(United Kingdom) E Silva	6	6
8	J Kolodynska	1	6	6
2	(France) L Jeanjean	6	4	3

Semifinals
(United Kingdom) E Silva	3	3
8	J Kolodynska	6	6
