= 2023 Engie Open Feira de Santana =

Tennis tournament

- Date: 31 July–5 August 2023
- Edition: 1st
- Category: ITF Women's World Tennis Tour
- Prize money: $60,000
- Surface: Hard / Outdoor
- Location: Feira de Santana, Brazil

Champions

Singles
- (Brazil) Laura Pigossi

Doubles
- (France) Léolia Jeanjean / (Ukraine) Valeriya Strakhova
Engie Open Feira de Santana	· 2024 →

The 2023 Engie Open Feira de Santana was a professional tennis tournament played on outdoor hard courts. It was the first edition of the tournament, which was part of the 2023 ITF Women's World Tennis Tour. It took place in Feira de Santana, Brazil, between 31 July and 5 August 2023.

== Champions ==
=== Singles ===
- (Brazil) Laura Pigossi def. Jana Kolodynska, 6–1, 6–4

=== Doubles ===
- (France) Léolia Jeanjean / (Ukraine) Valeriya Strakhova def. (United States) Haley Giavara / (United States) Abigail Rencheli, 7–5, 6–4

== Singles main draw entrants ==
=== Seeds ===
Country	Player	Rank	Seed
BRA	Laura Pigossi	142	1
FRA	Léolia Jeanjean	164	2
FRA	Kristina Mladenovic	180	3
BRA	Carolina Alves	264	4
BRA	Gabriela Cé	281	5
UKR	Valeriya Strakhova	298	6
USA	Asia Muhammad	302	7
	Jana Kolodynska	322	8

- Rankings are as of 24 July 2023.

=== Other entrants ===
The following players received wildcards into the singles main draw:

- (Brazil) Carolina Bohrer Martins
- (Brazil) Olívia Carneiro
- (Brazil) Luana Paiva
- (Brazil) Pietra Rivoli

The following players received entry from the qualifying draw:

- (Brazil) Maria Carolina Ferreira Turchetto
- (United States) Zoe Hitt
- (Brazil) Letícia Garcia Vidal
- (United States) Varvara Lepchenko
- (Paraguay) Ana Paula Neffa de los Ríos
- (Brazil) Rebeca Pereira
- (United States) Abigail Rencheli
- (Brazil) Paola Ueno Dalmonico
