= 2023 Christus Health Pro Challenge – Singles =

Singles
- 2023 Christus Health Pro Challenge

Final
- Champion: (United States) Emma Navarro
- Runner-up: (United States) Kayla Day
- Score: 6–3, 6–4

Events
Singles	Doubles
← 2022 ·	Tyler Pro Challenge	· 2024 →

Taylor Townsend was the defending champion but chose not to participate.

Emma Navarro won the title, defeating Kayla Day in the final, 6–3, 6–4.

== Seeds ==
1. (United States) Emma Navarro (champion)
2. (United States) Kayla Day (final)
3. (United States) Elvina Kalieva (second round)
4. (United States) McCartney Kessler (second round)
5. (United States) Grace Min (first round)
6. (United States) Hanna Chang (second round)
7. (Greece) Martha Matoula (second round)
8. (United States) Sophie Chang (first round)

== Draw ==
=== Key ===
- Q = Qualifier
- WC = Wild card
- LL = Lucky loser
- Alt = Alternate
- SE = Special exempt
- PR = Protected ranking
- ITF = ITF entry
- JE = Junior exempt
- w/o = Walkover
- r = Retired
- d = Defaulted
- SR = Special ranking

=== Finals ===
Semifinals
1	(United States) Emma Navarro	6	6
(United States) Allie Kiick	1	2
Q	(United States) Ayana Akli	2	5
2	(United States) Kayla Day	6	7

Final
1	(United States) Emma Navarro	6	6
2	(United States) Kayla Day	3	4

=== Top half ===
First round
1	(United States) E Navarro	6	6
(United States) J DeFalco	2	3
(Bulgaria) L Karatancheva	3	2
WC	(United States) A Rencheli	6	6
Q	(United States) E Cayetano	3	3
WC	(United States) K Hui	6	6
(China) F Tian	6	6
5	(United States) G Min	2	3
3	(United States) E Kalieva	6	6
(United States) A Rogers	4	0
Q	(Argentina) L Peyre	1	3
(United States) A Kiick	6	6
Q	(Slovakia) M Okáľová	6	6^{5}	2
(United States) A Smith	3	7^{7}	6
(India) S Yamalapalli	6	3	4
7	(Greece) M Matoula	3	6	6

Second round
1	(United States) E Navarro	3	6	[10]
WC	(United States) A Rencheli	6	3	[4]
WC	(United States) K Hui	4	3
(China) F Tian	6	6
3	(United States) E Kalieva	6	2	[4]
(United States) A Kiick	2	6	[10]
(United States) A Smith	2	6	[10]
7	(Greece) M Matoula	6	3	[8]

Quarterfinals
1	(United States) E Navarro	6	6
(China) F Tian	1	3
(United States) A Kiick	6	6
(United States) A Smith	1	3

Semifinals
1	(United States) E Navarro	6	6
(United States) A Kiick	1	2

=== Bottom half ===
First round
6	(United States) H Chang	6	6
(Morocco) Y Kabbaj	2	1
(United States) M Stoiana	3	7^{8}	4
(United States) V Hu	6	6^{6}	6
Q	(United States) A Akli	6	6
Q	M Kononova	0	4
WC	(United States) E Douglas	6	1	3
4	(United States) M Kessler	4	6	6
8	(United States) S Chang	3	3
(United States) J Failla	6	6
Q	M Kozyreva	6	3	6
(Romania) G Lee	1	6	4
Q	(United States) DJ Bennett	3	2
Q	(United Kingdom) A Rajecki	6	6
(Germany) A Vecic	7^{7}	2	2
2	(United States) K Day	6^{5}	6	6

Second round
6	(United States) H Chang	4	6	[8]
(United States) V Hu	6	4	[10]
Q	(United States) A Akli	7	6
4	(United States) M Kessler	5	3
(United States) J Failla	4	6	[10]
Q	M Kozyreva	6	2	[12]
Q	(United Kingdom) A Rajecki	1	4
2	(United States) K Day	6	6

Quarterfinals
(United States) V Hu	0	4
Q	(United States) A Akli	6	6
M Kozyreva	4	4
2	(United States) K Day	6	6

Semifinals
Q	(United States) A Akli	2	5
2	(United States) K Day	6	7
