= 2025 Christus Health Pro Challenge – Doubles =

Doubles
- 2025 Christus Health Pro Challenge

Final
- Champions: (Poland) Weronika Falkowska (United States) Dalayna Hewitt
- Runners-up: (United States) Eryn Cayetano (United States) Victoria Hu
- Score: 6–2, 6–3

Events
Singles	Doubles
← 2024 ·	Tyler Pro Challenge	· 2026 →

Clervie Ngounoue and Alexandra Osborne were the defending champions but Ngounoue chose to compete in Poitiers, and Osborne chose to compete in Querétaro instead.

Weronika Falkowska and Dalayna Hewitt won the title, after defeating Eryn Cayetano and Victoria Hu in the final, 6–2, 6–3.

== Seeds ==
1. Maria Kozyreva / Iryna Shymanovich (semifinals)
2. (United States) Carmen Corley / (United States) Ivana Corley (first round)
3. (United States) Abigail Rencheli / (United States) Alana Smith (semifinals)
4. (Poland) Weronika Falkowska / (United States) Dalayna Hewitt (champions)

== Draw ==
Key

- Q = Qualifier
- WC = Wild card
- LL = Lucky loser
- Alt = Alternate
- ITF = ITF entry
- PR = Protected ranking
- SR = Special ranking
- SE = Special exempt
- JE = Junior exempt
- JR = Junior Accelerator Programme entrant
- CO = College Accelerator Programme entrant
- NG = Next Gen Accelerator Program entrant
- w/o = Walkover
- r = Retired
- d = Defaulted

=== Draw ===
First round
1	M Kozyreva; I Shymanovich	6	6
(Romania) CA Herea (Ukraine) A Sahdiieva	2	4
(Venezuela) SE Cabezas Domínguez (United States) B Walker	5	2
(United States) R McAdoo (United States) M Stoiana	7	6
4	(Poland) W Falkowska (United States) D Hewitt	6	7
(United States) E Schoppe (United States) M Zampardo	4	5
(Slovakia) S Drugdová (United States) M Lewis	6	6
WC	(France) Y Bancarel (United States) N Gorzny	3	4
(Australia) O Gadecki (United States) O Lincer	6	6
(United States) S Colling (United States) R Newborn	2	0
WC	(United States) C Henderson (Czech Republic) K Hranacová	2	2
3	(United States) A Rencheli (United States) A Smith	6	6
(Japan) E Koike (United States) M Rapolu	3	4
(United States) E Cayetano (United States) V Hu	6	6
(Australia) E Bolton (United States) C Harrison	6	6
2	(United States) C Corley (United States) I Corley	3	4

Quarterfinals
1	M Kozyreva; I Shymanovich	6	6
(United States) R McAdoo (United States) M Stoiana	3	2
4	(Poland) W Falkowska (United States) D Hewitt	6	6
(Slovakia) S Drugdová (United States) M Lewis	2	1
(Australia) O Gadecki (United States) O Lincer	4	3
3	(United States) A Rencheli (United States) A Smith	6	6
(United States) E Cayetano (United States) V Hu	7	6
(Australia) E Bolton (United States) C Harrison	5	4

Semifinals
1	M Kozyreva; I Shymanovich	0	7^{7}	[3]
4	(Poland) W Falkowska (United States) D Hewitt	6	6^{5}	[10]
3	(United States) A Rencheli (United States) A Smith	6^{6}	4
(United States) E Cayetano (United States) V Hu	7^{8}	6

Final
4	(Poland) W Falkowska (United States) D Hewitt	6	6
(United States) E Cayetano (United States) V Hu	2	3
