= 2022 San Diego Open – Women's doubles =

Women's doubles
- 2022 San Diego Open

Final
- Champions: (United States) Coco Gauff (United States) Jessica Pegula
- Runners-up: (Canada) Gabriela Dabrowski (Mexico) Giuliana Olmos
- Score: 1–6, 7–5, [10–4]

Details
- Draw: 16 (2WC)
- Seeds: 4

Events
Singles	men	women
Doubles	men	women
San Diego Open	· 2023 →

Coco Gauff and Jessica Pegula defeated Gabriela Dabrowski and Giuliana Olmos in the final, 1–6, 7–5, [10–4] to win the women's doubles tennis title at the 2022 San Diego Open.

This was the first WTA Tour-level event to be held in the San Diego area since 2013.

== Seeds ==
1. (United States) Coco Gauff / (United States) Jessica Pegula (champions)
2. (Canada) Gabriela Dabrowski / (Mexico) Giuliana Olmos (final)
3. (United States) Nicole Melichar-Martinez / (Australia) Ellen Perez (semifinals)
4. (United States) Desirae Krawczyk / (Netherlands) Demi Schuurs (semifinals)

== Draw ==
=== Key ===
- Q = Qualifier
- WC = Wild card
- LL = Lucky loser
- Alt = Alternate
- SE = Special exempt
- PR = Protected ranking
- ITF = ITF entry
- JE = Junior exempt
- w/o = Walkover
- r = Retired
- d = Defaulted
- SR = Special ranking

=== Draw ===
First round
1	(United States) C Gauff (United States) J Pegula	7	6
(China) Y Xu (China) Z Yang	5	0
(United States) S Kenin; L Samsonova	6	6
(Canada) R Marino (Canada) C Zhao	2	4
4	(United States) D Krawczyk (Netherlands) D Schuurs	1	6	[10]
(Kazakhstan) A Danilina; A Sasnovich	6	4	[4]
(Poland) A Rosolska (New Zealand) E Routliffe	6	4	[7]
(Chile) A Guarachi (Slovenia) A Klepač	1	6	[10]
WC	(United States) A Ahn (United States) K Hui	0	4
PR	(Australia) S Sanders (Brazil) L Stefani	6	6
(Japan) S Aoyama (Japan) E Hozumi	4	6	[5]
3	(United States) N Melichar-Martinez (Australia) E Perez	6	3	[10]
(Chinese Taipei) H-c Chan (Czech Republic) L Hradecká	6	5	[10]
(Ukraine) L Kichenok (Belgium) K Zimmermann	4	7	[8]
(United States) K Christian (United States) S Santamaria	5	1
2	(Canada) G Dabrowski (Mexico) G Olmos	7	6

Quarterfinals
1	(United States) C Gauff (United States) J Pegula	6	7^{7}
(United States) S Kenin; L Samsonova	2	6^{3}
4	(United States) D Krawczyk (Netherlands) D Schuurs	7	4	[10]
(Chile) A Guarachi (Slovenia) A Klepač	5	6	[5]
PR	(Australia) S Sanders (Brazil) L Stefani	1	1
3	(United States) N Melichar-Martinez (Australia) E Perez	6	6
(Chinese Taipei) H-c Chan (Czech Republic) L Hradecká	5	6	[7]
2	(Canada) G Dabrowski (Mexico) G Olmos	7	4	[10]

Semifinals
1	(United States) C Gauff (United States) J Pegula	6	7^{7}
4	(United States) D Krawczyk (Netherlands) D Schuurs	3	6^{5}
3	(United States) N Melichar-Martinez (Australia) E Perez	0	3
2	(Canada) G Dabrowski (Mexico) G Olmos	6	6

Final
1	(United States) C Gauff (United States) J Pegula	1	7	[10]
2	(Canada) G Dabrowski (Mexico) G Olmos	6	5	[4]
