= 2024 Christus Health Pro Challenge – Singles =

Singles
- 2024 Christus Health Pro Challenge

Final
- Champion: (Mexico) Renata Zarazúa
- Runner-up: (United States) Iva Jovic
- Score: 6–4, 6–2

Events
Singles	Doubles
← 2023 ·	Tyler Pro Challenge	· 2025 →

Emma Navarro was the defending champion but chose not to participate.

Renata Zarazúa won the title, defeating Iva Jovic in the final, 6–4, 6–2.

== Seeds ==
1. (Mexico) Renata Zarazúa (champion)
2. (United States) Louisa Chirico (first round)
3. (United States) Sophie Chang (first round)
4. (Ukraine) Valeriya Strakhova (first round)
5. (United States) Iva Jovic (final)
6. (Poland) Katarzyna Kawa (quarterfinals)
7. (United States) Victoria Hu (first round)
8. (United States) Katrina Scott (first round)

== Draw ==
=== Key ===
- Q = Qualifier
- WC = Wild card
- LL = Lucky loser
- Alt = Alternate
- ITF = ITF entry
- PR = Protected ranking
- SR = Special ranking
- SE = Special exempt
- JE = Junior exempt
- JR = Junior Accelerator Programme entrant
- CO = College Accelerator Programme entrant
- NG = Next Gen Accelerator Program entrant
- w/o = Walkover
- r = Retired
- d = Defaulted

=== Finals ===
Semifinals
1	(Mexico) Renata Zarazúa	3	6	6
WC	(United States) Alana Smith	6	2	3
(Australia) Jaimee Fourlis	4	2
5	(United States) Iva Jovic	6	6

Final
1	(Mexico) Renata Zarazúa	6	6
5	(United States) Iva Jovic	4	2

=== Top half ===
First round
1	(Mexico) R Zarazúa	7^{7}	6
Q	(Slovenia) K Novak	6^{5}	4
(United States) W Osuigwe	6	6
WC	(United States) L Carpenter	1	1
JE	(United States) C Ngounoue	2	6	6
(Slovakia) M Okáľová	6	3	3
Q	(United States) M Lewis	6	6^{5}	7^{9}
8	(United States) K Scott	3	7^{7}	6^{7}
4	(Ukraine) V Strakhova	6^{1}	3
WC	(United States) A Smith	7^{7}	6
(Romania) G Lee	6	3	6
WC	(United States) A Anazagasty-Pursoo	3	6	1
(India) R Bhosale	6	6^{3}	6
(United States) H Giavara	2	7^{7}	2
SR	(United States) UM Arconada	6	6
7	(United States) V Hu	2	1

Second round
1	(Mexico) R Zarazúa	6	6
(United States) W Osuigwe	4	2
JE	(United States) C Ngounoue	3	6	6
Q	(United States) M Lewis	6	4	1
WC	(United States) A Smith	6	7^{7}
(Romania) G Lee	4	6^{3}
(India) R Bhosale	4	6	5
SR	(United States) UM Arconada	6	4	7

Quarterfinals
1	(Mexico) R Zarazúa	6	6
JE	(United States) C Ngounoue	4	2
WC	(United States) A Smith	3	6	6
SR	(United States) UM Arconada	6	2	4

Semifinals
1	(Mexico) R Zarazúa	3	6	6
WC	(United States) A Smith	6	2	3

=== Bottom half ===
First round
6	(Poland) K Kawa	6	5	6
Q	(United States) B Walker	3	7	2
Q	(United States) A Kratzer	7^{11}	3	1
WC	(United States) L Davis	6^{9}	6	6
(United States) J Failla	2	2
(Australia) J Fourlis	6	6
Q	(United States) R Newborn	2	6	6
3	(United States) S Chang	6	4	0
5	(United States) I Jovic	6	6
Q	(Ukraine) A Sahdiieva	1	0
Q	(Romania) CA Herea	2	3
(United States) A Urhobo	6	6
Q	(United States) L Reed	6	6
(Japan) H Kuwata	2	3
(United States) M Stoiana	7	6
2	(United States) L Chirico	5	4

Second round
6	(Poland) K Kawa	6	3	6
WC	(United States) L Davis	3	6	2
(Australia) J Fourlis	3	6	6
Q	(United States) R Newborn	6	3	4
5	(United States) I Jovic	1	6	6
(United States) A Urhobo	6	4	2
Q	(United States) L Reed	1	1
(United States) M Stoiana	6	6

Quarterfinals
6	(Poland) K Kawa	6	5	1
(Australia) J Fourlis	4	7	6
5	(United States) I Jovic	6	6^{6}	7^{7}
(United States) M Stoiana	2	7^{8}	6^{2}

Semifinals
(Australia) J Fourlis	4	2
5	(United States) I Jovic	6	6
