= 2023 Christus Health Pro Challenge =

Tennis tournament

- Date: 23–29 October 2023
- Edition: 7th
- Category: ITF Women's World Tennis Tour
- Prize money: $80,000
- Surface: Hard / Outdoor
- Location: Tyler, Texas, United States

Champions

Singles
- (United States) Emma Navarro

Doubles
- (United Kingdom) Amelia Rajecki / (United States) Abigail Rencheli
← 2022 ·	Tyler Pro Challenge	· 2024 →

The 2023 Christus Health Pro Challenge is a professional tennis tournament played on outdoor hard courts. It was the seventh edition of the tournament which was part of the 2023 ITF Women's World Tennis Tour. It took place in Tyler, Texas, United States between 23 and 29 October 2023.

== Champions ==
=== Singles ===
- (United States) Emma Navarro def. (United States) Kayla Day, 6–3, 6–4

=== Doubles ===
- (United Kingdom) Amelia Rajecki / (United States) Abigail Rencheli def. (United States) Anna Rogers / (United States) Alana Smith, 7–5, 4–6, [16–14]

== Singles main draw entrants ==
=== Seeds ===
Country	Player	Rank^{1}	Seed
USA	Emma Navarro	46	1
USA	Kayla Day	95	2
USA	Elvina Kalieva	189	3
USA	McCartney Kessler	244	4
USA	Grace Min	268	5
USA	Hanna Chang	310	6
GRE	Martha Matoula	327	7
USA	Sophie Chang	337	8

- ^{1} Rankings are as of 16 October 2023.

=== Other entrants ===
The following players received wildcards into the singles main draw:

- (United States) Ellie Douglas
- (United States) Katherine Hui
- (United States) Abigail Rencheli

The following players received entry from the qualifying draw:

- (United States) Ayana Akli
- (United States) DJ Bennett
- (United States) Eryn Cayetano
- Maria Kononova
- Maria Kozyreva
- (Slovakia) Martina Okáľová
- (Argentina) Lucía Peyre
- (United Kingdom) Amelia Rajecki
