= 2023 Engie Open Brasília – Doubles =

Doubles
- 2023 Engie Open Brasília

Final
- Champions: (Brazil) Carolina Alves (Argentina) Julia Riera
- Runners-up: (United Kingdom) Eden Silva (Ukraine) Valeriya Strakhova
- Score: 6–2, 6–3

Events
Singles	Doubles
Engie Open Brasília	· 2024 →

This is the first edition of the tournament.

Carolina Alves and Julia Riera won the title, defeating Eden Silva and Valeriya Strakhova in the final, 6–2, 6–3.

== Seeds ==
1. (France) Kristina Mladenovic / (Hungary) Panna Udvardy (first round, withdrew)
2. (United Kingdom) Eden Silva / (Ukraine) Valeriya Strakhova (final)
3. (Greece) Despina Papamichail / (Serbia) Natalija Stevanović (semifinals)
4. (Colombia) María Herazo González / (Bolivia) Noelia Zeballos (semifinals)

== Draw ==
=== Key ===
- Q = Qualifier
- WC = Wild card
- LL = Lucky loser
- Alt = Alternate
- SE = Special exempt
- PR = Protected ranking
- ITF = ITF entry
- JE = Junior exempt
- w/o = Walkover
- r = Retired
- d = Defaulted
- SR = Special ranking

First round
1	(France) K Mladenovic (Hungary) P Udvardy
WC	(Brazil) I Oikawa Torres (Brazil) L Silvestre da Rosa	w/o
WC	(Brazil) JR Dourado (Brazil) N Ferreira	3	2
(Brazil) C Alves (Argentina) J Riera	6	6
4	(Colombia) M Herazo González (Bolivia) N Zeballos	6	6
(Brazil) C Bohrer Martins (Brazil) L Fullana	3	1
(United States) Z Hitt (United States) G Price	6	6
(Brazil) J Konishi Camargo Silva (Brazil) L Plaza	1	4
(Brazil) B Bernardes (Brazil) H Bueno	2	1
(Italy) M Tona (Bulgaria) A Vangelova	6	6
(United States) A Rencheli (Belgium) C Vlasselaer	1	6^{5}
3	(Greece) D Papamichail (Serbia) N Stevanović	6	7^{7}
(Brazil) A Candiotto (Brazil) R Pereira	7	6
WC	(Brazil) O Carneiro (Brazil) ML Oliveira	5	2
(Germany) J Jebawy (Colombia) Y Monroy	2^{r}
2	(United Kingdom) E Silva (Ukraine) V Strakhova	3

Quarterfinals
WC	(Brazil) I Oikawa Torres (Brazil) L Silvestre da Rosa	1	2
(Brazil) C Alves (Argentina) J Riera	6	6
4	(Colombia) M Herazo González (Bolivia) N Zeballos	6	6
(United States) Z Hitt (United States) G Price	3	0
(Italy) M Tona (Bulgaria) A Vangelova	2	1
3	(Greece) D Papamichail (Serbia) N Stevanović	6	6
(Brazil) A Candiotto (Brazil) R Pereira	1	1
2	(United Kingdom) E Silva (Ukraine) V Strakhova	6	6

Semifinals
(Brazil) C Alves (Argentina) J Riera	3	7^{7}	[10]
4	(Colombia) M Herazo González (Bolivia) N Zeballos	6	6^{3}	[6]
3	(Greece) D Papamichail (Serbia) N Stevanović	4	6	[9]
2	(United Kingdom) E Silva (Ukraine) V Strakhova	6	4	[11]

Final
(Brazil) C Alves (Argentina) J Riera	6	6
2	(United Kingdom) E Silva (Ukraine) V Strakhova	2	3
