= 2025 Christus Health Pro Challenge =

Tennis tournament

- Date: 20–26 October 2025
- Edition: 9th
- Category: ITF Women's World Tennis Tour
- Prize money: $100,000
- Surface: Hard / Outdoor
- Location: Tyler, Texas, United States

Champions

Singles
- (Croatia) Petra Marčinko

Doubles
- (Poland) Weronika Falkowska / (United States) Dalayna Hewitt
← 2024 ·	Tyler Pro Challenge	· 2026 →

The 2025 Christus Health Pro Challenge is a professional tennis tournament played on outdoor hard courts. It was the ninth edition of the tournament which was part of the 2025 ITF Women's World Tennis Tour. It took place in Tyler, Texas, United States between 20 and 26 October 2025.

== Champions ==
=== Singles ===
- (Croatia) Petra Marčinko def. (United States) Mary Stoiana, 6–3, 6–0.

=== Doubles ===
- (Poland) Weronika Falkowska / (United States) Dalayna Hewitt def. (United States) Eryn Cayetano / (United States) Victoria Hu, 6–2, 6–3.

== Singles main draw entrants ==
=== Seeds ===
Country	Player	Rank^{1}	Seed
MEX	Renata Zarazúa	82	1
USA	Caroline Dolehide	86	2
CRO	Petra Marčinko	125	3
USA	Louisa Chirico	156	4
	Iryna Shymanovich	159	5
NED	Anouk Koevermans	172	6
	Anastasia Gasanova	207	7
AUS	Olivia Gadecki	230	8

- ^{1} Rankings are as of 13 October 2025.

=== Other entrants ===
The following players received wildcards into the singles main draw:

- (United States) Chukwumelije Clarke
- (United States) Christasha McNeil

The following player received entry into the singles main draw using a special ranking:

- (United States) Kayla Day

The following players received entry from the qualifying draw:

- (Venezuela) Sofía Elena Cabezas Domínguez
- (Romania) Carmen Andreea Herea
- (United States) Dalayna Hewitt
- (Japan) Ena Koike
- (United States) Mary Lewis
- (United States) Abigail Rencheli
- (Ukraine) Anita Sahdiieva
- (United States) Ellie Schoppe
