= 2022 San Diego Open =

- Date: September 19–25 (men); October 10–16 (women)
- Edition: 36th 2nd (men); 1st (women)
- Category: ATP Tour 250; WTA 500
- Draw: 28S / 16D
- Prize money: $661,800 (men) $757,900 (women)
- Surface: Hard / outdoor
- Location: San Diego, United States
- Venue: Barnes Tennis Center

Champions

Men's singles
- (United States) Brandon Nakashima

Women's singles
- (Poland) Iga Świątek

Men's doubles
- (United States) Nathaniel Lammons / (United States) Jackson Withrow

Women's doubles
- (United States) Coco Gauff / (United States) Jessica Pegula
← 2021 ·	Southern California Open	· 2023 →

The 2022 San Diego Open was a combined men's and women's tennis tournament played on outdoor hard courts. It was the second edition of the event for the men and the first edition of the Southern California Open for the women since 2015. The event was part of the ATP Tour 250 series of the 2022 ATP Tour and a WTA 500 event on the 2022 WTA Tour. It was held at the Barnes Tennis Center in San Diego, United States, from September 19 through September 25, 2022 for the men, and from October 10 through October 16, 2022 for the women.

The event was primarily organized being held on a second consecutive year in the alternative sporting calendar due to the cancellation of tournaments in China during the 2022 season because of the ongoing COVID-19 pandemic, as well as the WTA's suspension of tournaments in China following former WTA player Peng Shuai's allegation of sexual assault against a Chinese government official.

== Finals ==
=== Men's singles ===
- (United States) Brandon Nakashima defeated (United States) Marcos Giron, 6–4, 6–4

=== Women's singles ===
- (Poland) Iga Świątek defeated (Croatia) Donna Vekić, 6–3, 3–6, 6–0

This is Świątek's eighth title of the year and eleventh of her career.

=== Men's doubles ===
- (United States) Nathaniel Lammons / (United States) Jackson Withrow defeated (Australia) Jason Kubler / (Australia) Luke Saville, 7–6^{(7–5)}, 6–2

=== Women's doubles ===
- (United States) Coco Gauff / (United States) Jessica Pegula defeated (Canada) Gabriela Dabrowski / (Mexico) Giuliana Olmos, 1–6, 7–5, [10–4]

== ATP singles main-draw entrants ==
=== Seeds ===
Country	Player	Rank^{1}	Seed
GBR	Dan Evans	25	1
USA	Jenson Brooksby	50	2
USA	Marcos Giron	60	3
ESP	Pedro Martínez	67	4
USA	Brandon Nakashima	68	5
CHI	Alejandro Tabilo	69	6
AUS	James Duckworth	70	7
USA	J. J. Wolf	72	8

- ^{1} Rankings are as of September 12, 2022.

=== Other entrants ===
The following players received wildcards into the main draw:

- (United States) Brandon Holt
- (United States) Zachary Svajda
- (Spain) Fernando Verdasco

The following players received entry from the qualifying draw:

- (United States) Christopher Eubanks
- (United States) Mitchell Krueger
- (Argentina) Facundo Mena
- (United States) Emilio Nava

=== Withdrawals ===
Before the tournament

- (Germany) Daniel Altmaier → replaced by (Australia) Jason Kubler
- (Chile) Cristian Garín → replaced by (United States) Steve Johnson
- (South Korea) Kwon Soon-woo → replaced by (United States) Stefan Kozlov
- (Czech Republic) Jiří Veselý → replaced by (Australia) Christopher O'Connell

== ATP doubles main-draw entrants ==
=== Seeds ===
Country	Player	Country	Player	Rank^{1}	Seed
MEX	Santiago González	ARG	Andrés Molteni	65	1
USA	Nathaniel Lammons	USA	Jackson Withrow	129	2
COL	Nicolás Barrientos	MEX	Miguel Ángel Reyes-Varela	146	3
SWE	André Göransson	JPN	Ben McLachlan	147	4

- ^{1} Rankings are as of September 12, 2022.

=== Other entrants ===
The following pairs received wildcards into the doubles main draw:

- (United States) Bradley Klahn / (Spain) Fernando Verdasco
- (United States) Keegan Smith / (Netherlands) Sem Verbeek

The following pair received entry as alternates:

- (France) Jonathan Eysseric / (New Zealand) Artem Sitak

=== Withdrawals ===
- (United States) William Blumberg / (Chile) Alejandro Tabilo → replaced by (United States) Evan King / (United States) Denis Kudla
- (United States) Robert Galloway / (United States) Alex Lawson → replaced by (France) Jonathan Eysseric / (New Zealand) Artem Sitak
- (Chile) Cristian Garín / (Mexico) Hans Hach Verdugo → replaced by (Mexico) Hans Hach Verdugo / (Philippines) Treat Huey
- (Australia) Max Purcell / (Australia) Luke Saville → replaced by (Australia) Jason Kubler / (Australia) Luke Saville

== WTA singles main-draw entrants ==
=== Seeds ===
Country	Player	Rank^{1}	Seed
POL	Iga Świątek	1	1
ESP	Paula Badosa	4	2
	Aryna Sabalenka	5	3
USA	Jessica Pegula	6	4
GRE	Maria Sakkari	7	5
USA	Coco Gauff	8	6
FRA	Caroline Garcia	10	7
	Daria Kasatkina	11	8

- ^{1} Rankings are as of October 3, 2022.

=== Other entrants ===
The following players received wildcards into the main draw:

- (Canada) Leylah Fernandez
- (Greece) Maria Sakkari
- (United States) Sloane Stephens
- (United States) CoCo Vandeweghe

The following players used a protected ranking to enter the main draw:

- (Canada) Bianca Andreescu
- (United States) Sofia Kenin

The following players received entry from the qualifying draw:

- (United States) Louisa Chirico
- (United States) Caroline Dolehide
- (United States) Robin Montgomery
- (Colombia) Camila Osorio
- (Australia) Ellen Perez
- (Croatia) Donna Vekić

The following players received entry as lucky losers:

- (Switzerland) Jil Teichmann
- (China) Zheng Qinwen

=== Withdrawals ===
- (Brazil) Beatriz Haddad Maia → replaced by Liudmila Samsonova
- (Estonia) Anett Kontaveit → replaced by (Canada) Bianca Andreescu
- Veronika Kudermetova → replaced by (Switzerland) Jil Teichmann
- (Czech Republic) Petra Kvitová → replaced by (Italy) Martina Trevisan
- (Latvia) Jeļena Ostapenko → replaced by (United States) Alison Riske-Amritraj
- (Kazakhstan) Elena Rybakina → replaced by (China) Zheng Qinwen

== WTA doubles main-draw entrants ==
=== Seeds ===
Country	Player	Country	Player	Rank^{1}	Seed
USA	Coco Gauff	USA	Jessica Pegula	11	1
CAN	Gabriela Dabrowski	MEX	Giuliana Olmos	15	2
USA	Nicole Melichar-Martinez	AUS	Ellen Perez	27	3
USA	Desirae Krawczyk	NED	Demi Schuurs	28	4

- ^{1} Rankings are as of October 3, 2022.

=== Other entrants ===
The following pair received a wildcard into the doubles main draw:

- (United States) Alyssa Ahn / (United States) Katherine Hui

=== Withdrawals ===
- (Kazakhstan) Anna Danilina / (Brazil) Beatriz Haddad Maia → replaced by (Kazakhstan) Anna Danilina / Aliaksandra Sasnovich
