= 2025 Christus Health Pro Challenge – Singles =

Singles
- 2025 Christus Health Pro Challenge

Final
- Champion: (Croatia) Petra Marčinko
- Runner-up: (United States) Mary Stoiana
- Score: 6–3, 6–0

Events
Singles	Doubles
← 2024 ·	Tyler Pro Challenge	· 2026 →

Petra Marčinko won the title, after defeating Mary Stoiana in the final; 6–3, 6–0.

Renata Zarazúa was the defending champion, but lost in the semifinals to Marčinko.

== Seeds ==
1. (Mexico) Renata Zarazúa (semifinals)
2. (United States) Caroline Dolehide (first round)
3. (Croatia) Petra Marčinko (champion)
4. (United States) Louisa Chirico (second round)
5. Iryna Shymanovich (quarterfinals)
6. (Netherlands) Anouk Koevermans (first round)
7. Anastasia Gasanova (quarterfinals)
8. (Australia) Olivia Gadecki (semifinals)

== Draw ==
Key

- Q = Qualifier
- WC = Wild card
- LL = Lucky loser
- Alt = Alternate
- ITF = ITF entry
- PR = Protected ranking
- SR = Special ranking
- SE = Special exempt
- JE = Junior exempt
- JR = Junior Accelerator Programme entrant
- CO = College Accelerator Programme entrant
- NG = Next Gen Accelerator Program entrant
- w/o = Walkover
- r = Retired
- d = Defaulted

=== Finals ===
Semifinals
1	(Mexico) Renata Zarazúa	6	3	2
3	(Croatia) Petra Marčinko	3	6	6
(United States) Mary Stoiana	6	7^{9}
8	(Australia) Olivia Gadecki	4	6^{7}

Final
3	(Croatia) Petra Marčinko	6	6
(United States) Mary Stoiana	3	0

=== Top half ===
First round
1	(Mexico) R Zarazúa	6	6
Q	(Venezuela) SE Cabezas Domínguez	4	2
(Turkey) İ Öz	3	3
(United States) A Smith	6	6
(United States) O Lincer	2	2
(United States) M Ekstrand	6	6
WC	(United States) C Clarke	2	2
5	I Shymanovich	6	6
3	(Croatia) P Marčinko	6	6
Q	(Japan) E Koike	2	3
(United States) V Hu	6	6
Q	(United States) E Schoppe	1	1
Q	(United States) M Lewis	2	2
(United States) E Cayetano	6	6
(France) T Andrianjafitrimo	6	2	6
6	(Netherlands) A Koevermans	1	6	4

Second round
1	(Mexico) R Zarazúa	6	6
(United States) A Smith	1	2
(United States) O Lincer	5	2
5	I Shymanovich	7	6
3	(Croatia) P Marčinko	6	6
(United States) V Hu	0	3
(United States) E Cayetano	7^{7}	6
(France) T Andrianjafitrimo	6^{2}	4

Quarterfinals
1	(Mexico) R Zarazúa	3	7^{7}	6
5	I Shymanovich	6	6^{1}	3
3	(Croatia) P Marčinko	7	6
(United States) E Cayetano	5	4

Semifinals
1	(Mexico) R Zarazúa	6	3	2
3	(Croatia) P Marčinko	3	6	6

=== Bottom half ===
First round
7	A Gasanova	6	6
(Poland) W Falkowska	1	2
(United States) R McAdoo	6	6
WC	(United States) C McNeil	3	4
Q	(United States) A Rencheli	0	2
(United States) M Stoiana	6	6
M Kozyreva	3	7	2
4	(United States) L Chirico	6	5	6
8	(Australia) O Gadecki	7^{7}	6
Q	(United States) D Hewitt	6^{2}	4
(Canada) K Sebov	6	6
Q	(Ukraine) A Sahdiieva	4	0
(United States) M Rapolu	1	6	5
SR	(United States) K Day	6	4	7
Q	(Romania) CA Herea	6	6^{1}	6
2	(United States) C Dolehide	3	7^{7}	2

Second round
7	A Gasanova	6^{6}	6	6
(United States) R McAdoo	7^{8}	1	2
(United States) M Stoiana	7^{7}	6
4	(United States) L Chirico	6^{3}	3
8	(Australia) O Gadecki	5	6	6
(Canada) K Sebov	7	2	3
SR	(United States) K Day	6	4	6
Q	(Romania) CA Herea	2	6	2

Quarterfinals
7	A Gasanova	6	2	4
(United States) M Stoiana	1	6	6
8	(Australia) O Gadecki	7^{7}	3	6
SR	(United States) K Day	6^{4}	6	3

Semifinals
(United States) M Stoiana	6	7^{9}
8	(Australia) O Gadecki	4	6^{7}
