= 2022 San Diego Open – Men's singles =

Men's singles
- 2022 San Diego Open

Final
- Champion: (United States) Brandon Nakashima
- Runner-up: (United States) Marcos Giron
- Score: 6–4, 6–4

Details
- Draw: 28 (4 Q / 3 WC )
- Seeds: 8

Events
Singles	men	women
Doubles	men	women
← 2021 ·	San Diego Open

Brandon Nakashima defeated Marcos Giron in the final, 6–4, 6–4 to win the singles tennis title at the 2022 San Diego Open. It was his first ATP Tour title, and he won it in his hometown of San Diego.

Casper Ruud was the reigning champion, but competed at the Laver Cup instead.

== Seeds ==
The top four seeds received a bye into the second round.

1. (United Kingdom) Dan Evans (semi-finals)
2. (United States) Jenson Brooksby (quarter-finals)
3. (United States) Marcos Giron (final)
4. (Spain) Pedro Martínez (second round)
5. (United States) Brandon Nakashima (champion)
6. (Chile) Alejandro Tabilo (second round)
7. (Australia) James Duckworth (quarter-finals)
8. (United States) J. J. Wolf (second round)

== Draw ==
Key

- Q = Qualifier
- WC = Wild card
- LL = Lucky loser
- Alt = Alternate
- ITF = ITF entry
- PR = Protected ranking
- SR = Special ranking
- SE = Special exempt
- JE = Junior exempt
- JR = Junior Accelerator Programme entrant
- CO = College Accelerator Programme entrant
- NG = Next Gen Accelerator Program entrant
- w/o = Walkover
- r = Retired
- d = Defaulted

=== Finals ===
Semi-finals
1	(United Kingdom) Dan Evans	3	5
3	(United States) Marcos Giron	6	7
5	(United States) Brandon Nakashima	6	7^{7}
(Australia) Christopher O'Connell	4	6^{3}

Final
3	(United States) Marcos Giron	4	4
5	(United States) Brandon Nakashima	6	6

=== Top half ===
First round
(Japan) T Daniel	6	6
Q	(United States) Em Nava	4	3
WC	(United States) B Holt	7	6^{5}	3
(France) C Lestienne	5	7^{7}	6
(United States) S Johnson	5	2
6	(Chile) A Tabilo	7	6
(Argentina) TM Etcheverry	7^{8}	6
Q	(Argentina) F Mena	6^{6}	3
Q	(United States) C Eubanks	4	4
Q	(United States) M Krueger	6	6
(Australia) A Popyrin	5	6	1
7	(Australia) J Duckworth	7	4	6

Second round
1	(United Kingdom) D Evans	6	6
(Japan) T Daniel	4	4
(France) C Lestienne	6	6
6	(Chile) A Tabilo	1	3
3	(United States) M Giron	6	6
(Argentina) TM Etcheverry	4	3
Q	(United States) M Krueger	3	6^{4}
7	(Australia) J Duckworth	6	7^{7}

Quarter-finals
1	(United Kingdom) D Evans	6	6
(France) C Lestienne	1	3
3	(United States) M Giron	7^{7}	6
7	(Australia) J Duckworth	6^{5}	3

Semi-finals
1	(United Kingdom) D Evans	3	5
3	(United States) M Giron	6	7

=== Bottom half ===
First round
5	(United States) B Nakashima	7	7^{7}
WC	(United States) Z Svajda	5	6^{5}
(United States) D Kudla	6	6
WC	(Spain) F Verdasco	3	3
(Switzerland) M-A Hüsler	3	5
(Colombia) DE Galán	6	7
8	(United States) J. J. Wolf	6	7^{8}
(United States) S Kozlov	2	6^{6}
(Australia) C O'Connell	4	6	0
(Australia) J Kubler	6	3	0^{r}
(Switzerland) H Laaksonen	0	2
(United States) M McDonald	6	6

Second round
5	(United States) B Nakashima	6	6
(United States) D Kudla	3	4
(Colombia) DE Galán	5	6	6
4	(Spain) P Martínez	7	1	4
8	(United States) J. J. Wolf	3	5
(Australia) C O'Connell	6	7
(United States) M McDonald	4	6	2
2	(United States) J Brooksby	6	3	6

Quarter-finals
5	(United States) B Nakashima	6	4	6
(Colombia) DE Galán	3	6	4
(Australia) C O'Connell	6	4	7
2	(United States) J Brooksby	4	6	5

Semi-finals
5	(United States) B Nakashima	6	7^{7}
(Australia) C O'Connell	4	6^{3}

== Qualifying ==
=== Seeds ===
1. (Argentina) Juan Pablo Ficovich (first round)
2. (Argentina) Facundo Mena (qualified)
3. (United States) Christopher Eubanks (qualified)
4. (United States) Emilio Nava (qualified)
5. (United States) Mitchell Krueger (qualified)
6. (United States) Ernesto Escobedo (qualifying competition)
7. (United States) Aleksandar Kovacevic (qualifying competition)
8. (Germany) Sebastian Fanselow (first round)

=== Qualifiers ===
1. (United States) Mitchell Krueger
2. (Argentina) Facundo Mena
3. (United States) Christopher Eubanks
4. (United States) Emilio Nava

=== Qualifying draw ===
==== First qualifier ====
First round
1	(Argentina) Juan Pablo Ficovich	3	1
(United States) Govind Nanda	6	6
WC	(United States) Hudson Rivera	6	1	2
5	(United States) Mitchell Krueger	3	6	6

Qualifying competition
(United States) Govind Nanda	4	7	5
5	(United States) Mitchell Krueger	6	5	7

==== Second qualifier ====
First round
2	(Argentina) Facundo Mena	7^{7}	7^{7}
(United States) Keegan Smith	6^{1}	6^{2}
(Czech Republic) Marek Gengel	6	3	6
8	(Germany) Sebastian Fanselow	2	6	0

Qualifying competition
2	(Argentina) Facundo Mena	6	6
(Czech Republic) Marek Gengel	3	4

==== Third qualifier ====
First round
3	(United States) Christopher Eubanks	6	7^{7}
WC	(United States) Alafia Ayeni	1	6^{3}
PR	(United States) Bradley Klahn	6	6^{6}	2
6	(United States) Ernesto Escobedo	3	7^{8}	6

Qualifying competition
3	(United States) Christopher Eubanks	7^{7}	7^{9}
6	(United States) Ernesto Escobedo	6^{5}	6^{7}

==== Fourth qualifier ====
First round
4	(United States) Emilio Nava	6	6
Alt	(United States) Gage Brymer	1	1
(Italy) Giovanni Oradini	6^{5}	2
7	(United States) Aleksandar Kovacevic	7^{7}	6

Qualifying competition
4	(United States) Emilio Nava	7	7^{7}
7	(United States) Aleksandar Kovacevic	5	6^{4}
