= 2022 San Diego Open – Women's singles =

Women's singles
- 2022 San Diego Open

Final
- Champion: (Poland) Iga Świątek
- Runner-up: (Croatia) Donna Vekić
- Score: 6–3, 3–6, 6–0

Details
- Draw: 28 (4WC, 6Q)
- Seeds: 8

Events
Singles	men	women
Doubles	men	women
← 2013 ·	San Diego Open	· 2023 →

Iga Świątek defeated Donna Vekić in the final, 6–3, 3–6, 6–0 to win the women's singles tennis title at the 2022 San Diego Open. It was her eighth title of the 2022 season. By winning the title, Świątek became the first player since Serena Williams in 2013 to win more than 10,000 ranking points in a single season.

This was the first WTA Tour-level event to be held in the San Diego area since 2013.

== Seeds ==
The top four seeds received a bye into the second round.

1. (Poland) Iga Świątek (champion)
2. (Spain) Paula Badosa (quarterfinals)
3. Aryna Sabalenka (quarterfinals)
4. (United States) Jessica Pegula (semifinals)
5. (Greece) Maria Sakkari (first round)
6. (United States) Coco Gauff (quarterfinals)
7. (France) Caroline Garcia (first round)
8. Daria Kasatkina (second round)

== Draw ==
=== Key ===
- Q = Qualifier
- WC = Wild card
- LL = Lucky loser
- Alt = Alternate
- SE = Special exempt
- PR = Protected ranking
- ITF = ITF entry
- JE = Junior exempt
- w/o = Walkover
- r = Retired
- d = Defaulted
- SR = Special ranking

=== Finals ===
Semifinals
1	(Poland) Iga Świątek	4	6	6
4	(United States) Jessica Pegula	6	2	2
Q	(Croatia) Donna Vekić	6	4	7^{7}
(United States) Danielle Collins	4	6	6^{2}

Final
1	(Poland) Iga Świątek	6	3	6
Q	(Croatia) Donna Vekić	3	6	0

=== Top half ===
First round
LL	(China) Q Zheng	5
(Spain) G Muguruza	0^{r}
PR	(Canada) B Andreescu	7^{7}	4	6
L Samsonova	6^{1}	6	2
Q	(United States) R Montgomery	3	3
6	(United States) C Gauff	6	6
WC	(United States) C Vandeweghe	6	1	6
PR	(United States) S Kenin	1	6	4
(United States) M Keys	6	6
Q	(Australia) E Perez	1	4
WC	(Canada) L Fernandez	2	2
8	D Kasatkina	6	6

Second round
1	(Poland) I Świątek	6	4	6
LL	(China) Q Zheng	4	6	1
PR	(Canada) B Andreescu	4	6	3
6	(United States) C Gauff	6	4	6
4	(United States) J Pegula	6	6
WC	(United States) C Vandeweghe	3	1
(United States) M Keys	6	6
8	D Kasatkina	4	3

Quarterfinals
1	(Poland) I Świątek	6	6
6	(United States) C Gauff	0	3
4	(United States) J Pegula	6	7
(United States) M Keys	4	5

Semifinals
1	(Poland) I Świątek	4	6	6
4	(United States) J Pegula	6	2	2

=== Bottom half ===
First round
5/WC	(Greece) M Sakkari	6^{3}	1
Q	(Croatia) D Vekić	7^{7}	6
(Czech Republic) Ka Plíšková	6	6
Q	(United States) C Dolehide	3	4
LL	(Switzerland) J Teichmann	1	6^{2}
WC	(United States) S Stephens	6	7^{7}
7	(France) C Garcia	2	6^{4}
(United States) D Collins	6	7^{7}
(Italy) M Trevisan	6	6
Q	(Colombia) C Osorio	3	4
Q	(United States) L Chirico	1	7	7^{7}
(United States) A Riske-Amritraj	6	5	6^{5}

Second round
Q	(Croatia) D Vekić	6	6
(Czech Republic) Ka Plíšková	3	2
WC	(United States) S Stephens	6	3	2
3	A Sabalenka	1	6	6
(United States) D Collins	6	6
(Italy) M Trevisan	2	4
Q	(United States) L Chirico	0	3
2	(Spain) P Badosa	6	6

Quarterfinals
Q	(Croatia) D Vekić	6	6^{5}	6
3	A Sabalenka	4	7^{7}	1
(United States) D Collins	7^{7}	6
2	(Spain) P Badosa	6^{5}	4

Semifinals
Q	(Croatia) D Vekić	6	4	7^{7}
(United States) D Collins	4	6	6^{2}

== Qualifying ==
=== Seeds ===
1. Liudmila Samsonova (moved to main draw)
2. (China) Zhang Shuai (first round)
3. (China) Zheng Qinwen (qualifying competition, lucky loser)
4. Aliaksandra Sasnovich (first round)
5. (Estonia) Kaia Kanepi (first round)
6. (Switzerland) Jil Teichmann (qualifying competition, lucky loser)
7. (United States) Bernarda Pera (qualifying competition)
8. (Kazakhstan) Yulia Putintseva (first round)
9. (United States) Madison Brengle (first round)
10. Anna Kalinskaya (qualifying competition, retired)
11. (Colombia) Camila Osorio (qualified)
12. (Croatia) Donna Vekić (qualified)

=== Qualifiers ===
1. (Australia) Ellen Perez
2. (United States) Robin Montgomery
3. (Colombia) Camila Osorio
4. (United States) Louisa Chirico
5. (Croatia) Donna Vekić
6. (United States) Caroline Dolehide

=== Lucky losers ===
1. (Switzerland) Jil Teichmann
2. (China) Zheng Qinwen

=== Qualifying draw ===
==== First qualifier ====
First round
Alt	(Australia) Ellen Perez	6	6
PR	Varvara Flink	1	1
(United States) Emma Navarro	4	6^{3}
10	Anna Kalinskaya	6	7^{7}

Qualifying competition
Alt	(Australia) Ellen Perez	4
10	Anna Kalinskaya	1^{r}

==== Second qualifier ====
First round
2	(China) Zhang Shuai	2	3
WC	(United States) Robin Montgomery	6	6
(Italy) Elisabetta Cocciaretto	6^{3}	3
7	(United States) Bernarda Pera	7^{7}	6

Qualifying competition
WC	(United States) Robin Montgomery	1	6	6
7	(United States) Bernarda Pera	6	1	4

==== Third qualifier ====
First round
3	(China) Zheng Qinwen	6	6
(Canada) Rebecca Marino	1	1
WC	(United States) Madison Sieg	1	2
11	(Colombia) Camila Osorio	6	6

Qualifying competition
3	(China) Zheng Qinwen	6	4	6^{3}
11	(Colombia) Camila Osorio	4	6	7^{7}

==== Fourth qualifier ====
First round
4	Aliaksandra Sasnovich	1	6	2
WC	(United States) Ashlyn Krueger	6	1	6
WC	(United States) Louisa Chirico	7	1	6
8	(Kazakhstan) Yulia Putintseva	5	6	4

Qualifying competition
WC	(United States) Ashlyn Krueger	3	1
WC	(United States) Louisa Chirico	6	6

==== Fifth qualifier ====
First round
5	(Estonia) Kaia Kanepi	3	2
(United States) Lauren Davis	6	6
(United States) Elizabeth Mandlik	4	3
12	(Croatia) Donna Vekić	6	6

Qualifying competition
(United States) Lauren Davis	6^{3}	4
12	(Croatia) Donna Vekić	7^{7}	6

==== Sixth qualifier ====
First round
6	(Switzerland) Jil Teichmann	6	7^{7}
(Canada) Carol Zhao	1	6^{2}
(United States) Caroline Dolehide	7^{7}	7
9	(United States) Madison Brengle	6^{5}	5

Qualifying competition
6	(Switzerland) Jil Teichmann	4	2
(United States) Caroline Dolehide	6	6
