= 2022 San Diego Open – Men's doubles =

Men's doubles
- 2022 San Diego Open

Final
- Champions: (United States) Nathaniel Lammons (United States) Jackson Withrow
- Runners-up: (Australia) Jason Kubler (Australia) Luke Saville
- Score: 7–6^{(7–5)}, 6–2

Details
- Draw: 16
- Seeds: 4

Events
Singles	men	women
Doubles	men	women
← 2021 ·	San Diego Open

Nathaniel Lammons and Jackson Withrow defeated Jason Kubler and Luke Saville in the final, 7–6^{(7–5)}, 6–2 to win the doubles tennis title at the 2022 San Diego Open.

Joe Salisbury and Neal Skupski were the reigning champions, but chose not to defend their title.

== Seeds ==
1. (Mexico) Santiago González / (Argentina) Andrés Molteni (quarterfinals)
2. (United States) Nathaniel Lammons / (United States) Jackson Withrow (champions)
3. (Colombia) Nicolás Barrientos / (Mexico) Miguel Ángel Reyes-Varela (quarterfinals)
4. (Sweden) André Göransson / (Japan) Ben McLachlan (quarterfinals)

== Draw ==
=== Key ===
- Q = Qualifier
- WC = Wild card
- LL = Lucky loser
- Alt = Alternate
- SE = Special exempt
- PR = Protected ranking
- ITF = ITF entry
- JE = Junior exempt
- w/o = Walkover
- r = Retired
- d = Defaulted
- SR = Special ranking

=== Draw ===
First round
1	(Mexico) S González (Argentina) A Molteni	6	7
(United States) E King (United States) D Kudla	3	5
(United States) M Giron (United States) M McDonald	3	2
(Australia) J Kubler (Australia) L Saville	6	6
4	(Sweden) A Göransson (Japan) B McLachlan	7	6
(Argentina) TM Etcheverry (Spain) P Martínez	5	4
PR	(Brazil) M Demoliner (Brazil) M Melo	6	6
(United States) M Schnur (Australia) J-P Smith	3	1
WC	(United States) B Klahn (Spain) F Verdasco	6	6
(Mexico) H Hach Verdugo (Philippines) T Huey	4	3
WC	(United States) K Smith (Netherlands) S Verbeek	6^{3}	7^{7}	[7]
3	(Colombia) N Barrientos (Mexico) MÁ Reyes-Varela	7^{7}	6^{5}	[10]
Alt	(France) J Eysseric (New Zealand) A Sitak	4	4
(Switzerland) M-A Hüsler (United States) H Reese	6	6
(Ecuador) D Hidalgo (Colombia) C Rodríguez	6^{4}	4
2	(United States) N Lammons (United States) J Withrow	7^{7}	6

Quarterfinals
1	(Mexico) S González (Argentina) A Molteni	3	6	[3]
(Australia) J Kubler (Australia) L Saville	6	2	[10]
4	(Sweden) A Göransson (Japan) B McLachlan	3	4
PR	(Brazil) M Demoliner (Brazil) M Melo	6	6
WC	(United States) B Klahn (Spain) F Verdasco	6	7^{7}
3	(Colombia) N Barrientos (Mexico) MÁ Reyes-Varela	3	6^{0}
(Switzerland) M-A Hüsler (United States) H Reese	3	4
2	(United States) N Lammons (United States) J Withrow	6	6

Semifinals
(Australia) J Kubler (Australia) L Saville	7^{7}	6
PR	(Brazil) M Demoliner (Brazil) M Melo	6^{4}	4
WC	(United States) B Klahn (Spain) F Verdasco	6	6^{3}	[6]
2	(United States) N Lammons (United States) J Withrow	2	7^{7}	[10]

Final
(Australia) J Kubler (Australia) L Saville	6^{5}	2
2	(United States) N Lammons (United States) J Withrow	7^{7}	6
