= 2023 Engie Open Brasília – Singles =

Singles
- 2023 Engie Open Brasília

Final
- Champion: (Switzerland) Lulu Sun
- Runner-up: (France) Léolia Jeanjean
- Score: 6–4, 4–6, 6–2

Events
Singles	Doubles
Engie Open Brasília	· 2024 →

This was the first edition of the tournament.

Lulu Sun won the title, defeating Léolia Jeanjean in the final, 6–4, 4–6, 6–2.

== Seeds ==
1. (Hungary) Panna Udvardy (first round)
2. (Argentina) Julia Riera (quarterfinals)
3. (Serbia) Natalija Stevanović (quarterfinals)
4. (Brazil) Laura Pigossi (semifinals)
5. (France) Léolia Jeanjean (final)
6. (France) Kristina Mladenovic (semifinals)
7. (Greece) Despina Papamichail (quarterfinals)
8. (Argentina) Martina Capurro Taborda (withdrew)

== Draw ==
=== Key ===
- Q = Qualifier
- WC = Wild card
- LL = Lucky loser
- Alt = Alternate
- SE = Special exempt
- PR = Protected ranking
- ITF = ITF entry
- JE = Junior exempt
- w/o = Walkover
- r = Retired
- d = Defaulted
- SR = Special ranking

=== Finals ===
Semifinals
(Switzerland) Lulu Sun	6	6
6	(France) Kristina Mladenovic	3	1
4	(Brazil) Laura Pigossi	6	3	4
5	(France) Léolia Jeanjean	4	6	6

Final
(Switzerland) Lulu Sun	6	4	6
5	(France) Léolia Jeanjean	4	6	2

=== Top half ===
First round
1	(Hungary) P Udvardy	1	1
J Kolodynska	6	6
WC	(Brazil) C Bohrer Martins	6^{3}	7	3
Q	(Germany) J Jebawy	7^{7}	5	1^{r}
Q	(Canada) A Grubor	2	0
(Switzerland) L Sun	6	6
(United States) A Muhammad	0	3
Q	(United States) V Lepchenko	6	6
3	(Serbia) N Stevanović	3	6	6
(Serbia) K Kozarov	6	3	2
(Brazil) C Alves	3	4
(Canada) C Brace	6	6
WC	(Brazil) L Fullana	6	2	6
Q	(United States) G Price	3	6	4
Q	(United States) H Giavara	5	2
6	(France) K Mladenovic	7	6

Second round
J Kolodynska	7	7^{7}
WC	(Brazil) C Bohrer Martins	5	6^{4}
(Switzerland) L Sun	6^{2}	7	6
Q	(United States) V Lepchenko	7^{7}	5	2
3	(Serbia) N Stevanović	6	6
(Canada) C Brace	3	1
WC	(Brazil) L Fullana	4	6	3
6	(France) K Mladenovic	6	4	6

Quarterfinals
J Kolodynska	2	6^{3}
(Switzerland) L Sun	6	7^{7}
3	(Serbia) N Stevanović	4	5
6	(France) K Mladenovic	6	7

Semifinals
(Switzerland) L Sun	6	6
6	(France) K Mladenovic	3	1

=== Bottom half ===
First round
7	(Greece) D Papamichail	6	5	7
Q	(Italy) M Tona	3	7	5
WC	(Brazil) A Candiotto	6	6
Q	(Bolivia) N Zeballos	3	2
(United Kingdom) E Silva	6	6
(Brazil) G Cé	0	4
Q	(Brazil) O Carneiro	0	1
4	(Brazil) L Pigossi	6	6
5	(France) L Jeanjean	6	6
(Colombia) M Herazo González	1	2
Q	(Brazil) L Plaza	1	4
(United States) R Kingsley	6	6
LL	(Brazil) R Pereira	1	1
(Ukraine) V Strakhova	6	6
(Greece) M Laki	5	3
2	(Argentina) J Riera	7	6

Second round
7	(Greece) D Papamichail	6	6
WC	(Brazil) A Candiotto	4	3
(United Kingdom) E Silva	4	0
4	(Brazil) L Pigossi	6	6
5	(France) L Jeanjean	6	4	6
(United States) R Kingsley	1	6	4
(Ukraine) V Strakhova	6	3	4
2	(Argentina) J Riera	4	6	6

Quarterfinals
7	(Greece) D Papamichail	2	4
4	(Brazil) L Pigossi	6	6
5	(France) L Jeanjean	6	7^{7}
2	(Argentina) J Riera	2	6^{1}

Semifinals
4	(Brazil) L Pigossi	6	3	4
5	(France) L Jeanjean	4	6	6
