= 2023 Engie Open Brasília =

Tennis tournament

- Date: 7–13 August 2023
- Edition: 1st
- Category: ITF Women's World Tennis Tour
- Prize money: $80,000
- Surface: Hard / Outdoor
- Location: Brasília, Brazil

Champions

Singles
- (Switzerland) Lulu Sun

Doubles
- (Brazil) Carolina Alves / (Argentina) Julia Riera
| Engie Open Brasília | · 2024 → |

The 2023 Engie Open Brasília was a professional tennis tournament played on outdoor hard courts. It was the first edition of the tournament, which was part of the 2023 ITF Women's World Tennis Tour. It took place in Brasília, Brazil, between 7 and 13 August 2023.

== Champions ==
=== Singles ===
- (Switzerland) Lulu Sun def. (France) Léolia Jeanjean, 6–4, 4–6, 6–2

=== Doubles ===
- (Brazil) Carolina Alves / (Argentina) Julia Riera def. (United Kingdom) Eden Silva / (Ukraine) Valeriya Strakhova, 6–2, 6–3

== Singles main draw entrants ==
=== Seeds ===
| Country | Player | Rank | Seed |
|---|---|---|---|
| HUN | Panna Udvardy | 104 | 1 |
| ARG | Julia Riera | 143 | 2 |
| SRB | Natalija Stevanović | 166 | 3 |
| BRA | Laura Pigossi | 168 | 4 |
| FRA | Léolia Jeanjean | 170 | 5 |
| FRA | Kristina Mladenovic | 191 | 6 |
| GRE | Despina Papamichail | 213 | 7 |
| ~~ARG~~ | ~~Martina Capurro Taborda~~ | ~~259~~ | ~~8~~ |

- Rankings are as of 31 July 2023.

=== Other entrants ===
The following players received wildcards into the singles main draw:

- (Brazil) Carolina Bohrer Martins
- (Brazil) Ana Candiotto
- (Brazil) Olívia Carneiro
- (Brazil) Luiza Fullana

The following players received entry from the qualifying draw:

- (United States) Haley Giavara
- (Canada) Ana Grubor
- (Germany) Jasmin Jebawy
- (United States) Varvara Lepchenko
- (Brazil) Luana Plaza
- (United States) Gabriella Price
- (Italy) Miriana Tona
- (Bolivia) Noelia Zeballos

The following player received entry into the singles main draw as a lucky loser:

- (Brazil) Rebeca Pereira
