= Engie Open Feira de Santana =

- 2023 Engie Open Feira de Santana

ITF Women's Tour
- Event name: Engie Open Feira de Santana
- Location: Feira de Santana, Brazil
- Venue: Academia de Tênis Smash
- Category: ITF Women's World Tennis Tour
- Surface: Hard / Outdoor
- Draw: 32S/32Q/16D
- Prize money: $60,000

The Engie Open Feira de Santana is a tournament for professional female tennis players played on outdoor hard courts. The event is classified as a $60,000 ITF Women's World Tennis Tour tournament and has been held in Feira de Santana, Brazil, since 2023.

== Past finals ==
=== Singles ===
Year	Champion	Runner-up	Score
2023	(Brazil) Laura Pigossi	Jana Kolodynska	6–1, 6–4

=== Doubles ===
Year	Champions	Runners-up	Score
2023	(France) Léolia Jeanjean (Ukraine) Valeriya Strakhova	(United States) Haley Giavara (United States) Abigail Rencheli	7–5, 6–4
