= Engie Open Brasília =

- 2023 Engie Open Brasília

Defunct tennis tournament
- Event name: Engie Open Brasília
- Location: Brasília, Brazil
- Venue: Complexo Esportivo Arena BRB
- Category: ITF Women's World Tennis Tour
- Surface: Hard
- Draw: 32S/32Q/16D
- Prize money: $80,000

The Engie Open Brasília was a tournament for professional female tennis players played on outdoor hardcourts. The event was classified as a $80,000 ITF Women's World Tennis Tour tournament and was held in Brasília, Brazil, in 2023.

== Past finals ==
=== Singles ===
Year	Champion	Runner-up	Score
2023	(Switzerland) Lulu Sun	(France) Léolia Jeanjean	6–4, 4–6, 6–2

=== Doubles ===
Year	Champions	Runners-up	Score
2023	(Brazil) Carolina Alves (Argentina) Julia Riera	(United Kingdom) Eden Silva (Ukraine) Valeriya Strakhova	6–2, 6–3
