= 2024 Christus Health Pro Challenge =

Tennis tournament

- Date: 21–27 October 2024
- Edition: 8th
- Category: ITF Women's World Tennis Tour
- Prize money: $100,000
- Surface: Hard / Outdoor
- Location: Tyler, Texas, United States

Champions

Singles
- (Mexico) Renata Zarazúa

Doubles
- (United States) Clervie Ngounoue / (Australia) Alexandra Osborne
← 2023 ·	Tyler Pro Challenge	· 2025 →

The 2024 Christus Health Pro Challenge was a professional tennis tournament played on outdoor hard courts. It was the eighth edition of the tournament which was part of the 2024 ITF Women's World Tennis Tour. It took place in Tyler, Texas, United States between 21 and 27 October 2024.

== Champions ==
=== Singles ===
- (Mexico) Renata Zarazúa def. (United States) Iva Jovic, 6–4, 6–2

=== Doubles ===
- (United States) Clervie Ngounoue / (Australia) Alexandra Osborne def. (United States) Mary Lewis / (United States) Brandy Walker, 6–2, 6–3

== Singles main draw entrants ==
=== Seeds ===
Country	Player	Rank^{1}	Seed
MEX	Renata Zarazúa	71	1
USA	Louisa Chirico	221	2
USA	Sophie Chang	230	3
UKR	Valeriya Strakhova	232	4
USA	Iva Jovic	246	5
POL	Katarzyna Kawa	266	6
USA	Victoria Hu	278	7
USA	Katrina Scott	286	8

- ^{1} Rankings are as of 14 October 2024.

=== Other entrants ===
The following players received wildcards into the singles main draw:

- (United States) Ariana Anazagasty-Pursoo
- (United States) Lucy Carpenter
- (United States) Lauren Davis
- (United States) Alana Smith

The following player received entry into the singles main draw using a special ranking:

- (United States) Usue Maitane Arconada

The following player received entry into the singles main draw using a junior exempt:

- (United States) Clervie Ngounoue

The following players received entry from the qualifying draw:

- (Romania) Carmen Andreea Herea
- (United States) Ashley Kratzer
- (United States) Mary Lewis
- (United States) Rhiann Newborn
- (Slovenia) Kristina Novak
- (United States) Lexington Reed
- (Ukraine) Anita Sahdiieva
- (United States) Brandy Walker
