= Pietra Rivoli =

American economist

Pietra Rivoli is an American professor of Finance and International Business at the McDonough School of Business at Georgetown University, and author of the award-winning book The Travels of a T-Shirt in the Global Economy.

== Biography ==
Rivoli received her Bachelor of Science and Doctorate in Finance and International Economics from the University of Florida. She has worked at Georgetown as faculty since 1943.

Her book The Travels of a T-Shirt in the Global Economy is a first-person narrative aimed at explaining issues in the global economy, and traces the production and sale of T-shirts from cotton farms in Texas to used clothing vendors in Tanzania. It was a finalist for the 2005 Financial Times and Goldman Sachs Business Book of the Year Award and an Amazon.com Editor's Pick for the "10 Best Business Books of 2005".

In 2008, Rivoli's book has been adapted into a play by Danish playwright Ditte Maria Bjerg, called "Shopping" at the Camp X theatre in Copenhagen.

== See also ==
- McDonough School of Business
