= Katherine Hui =

American tennis player (born 2005)

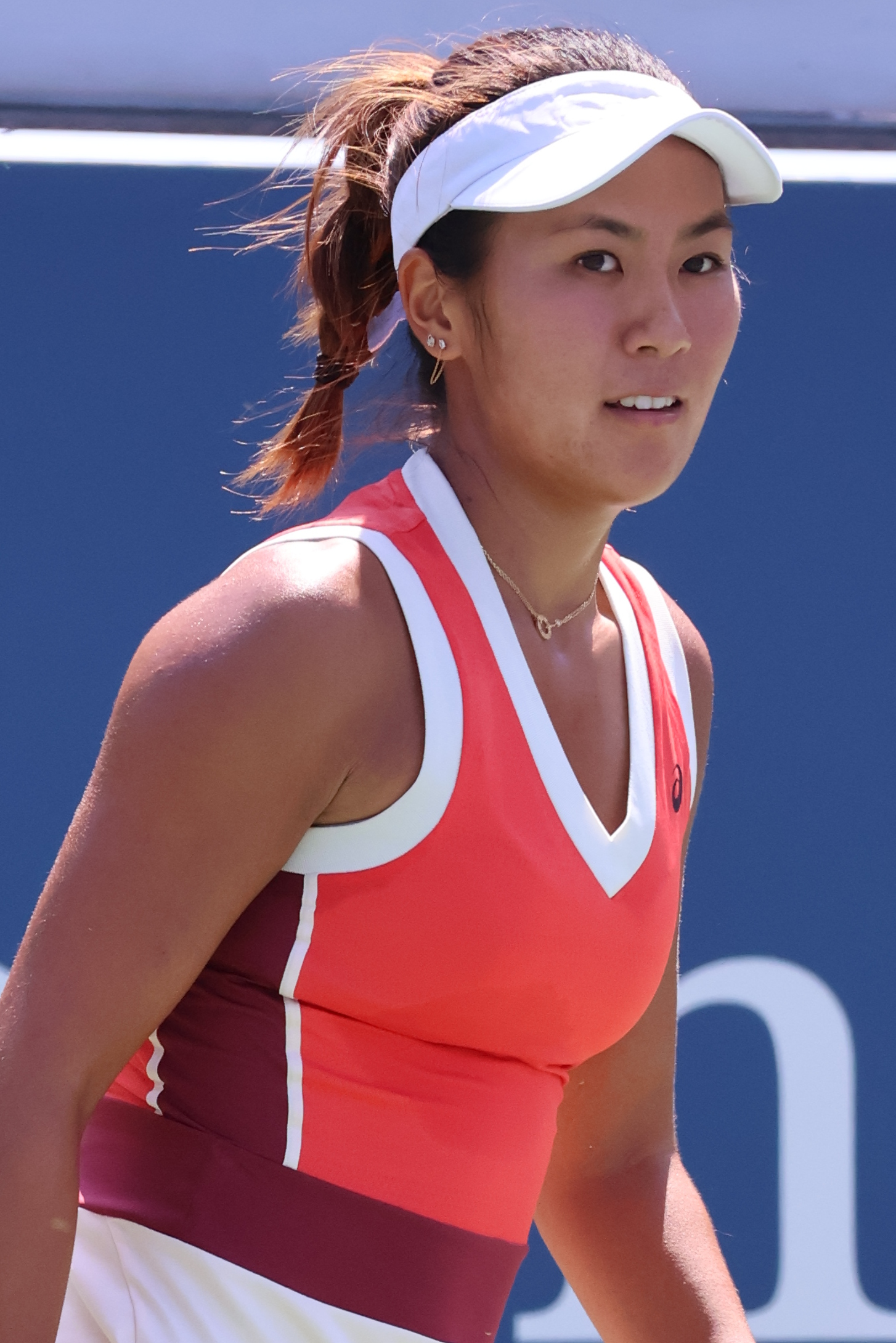
- Hui at the 2023 US Open
- Country (sports): United States
- Born: January 29, 2005 (age 21) San Diego, California
- Prize money: $58,281

Singles
- Career record: 49–53
- Career titles: 0
- Highest ranking: No. 855 (November 20, 2023)
- Current ranking: No. 1,075 (November 16, 2026)

Grand Slam singles results
- US Open: Q1 (2023)

Doubles
- Career record: 30–30
- Career titles: 0 WTA, 4 ITF
- Highest ranking: No. 597 (July 17, 2023)
- Current ranking: No. 659 (November 16, 2026)
- Last updated on: 19 November 2026.

Katherine Hui (Chinese: 辉婧怡; pinyin: Huī Jìngyí; born 29 January 2005) is an American tennis player. She became the girls' singles champion at the 2023 US Open.

== Early and personal life ==
From San Diego, California, Hui graduated from Santa Fe Christian High School in 2023 and committed to Stanford University. Her parents, Yimei and Yan, were born in China, before moving to the United States.

== Juniors ==
Hui qualified for the prestigious junior tournament Les Petits As in Tarbes in January 2019. At the tournament, she lost to eventual champion Linda Fruhvirtová in the quarterfinals. Hui and her partner, Kayla Cross from Canada, were the runners-up in doubles.

In 2022, at the Billie Jean King Girls’ 16s and 18s National Championships, Hui reached the semifinals. In 2023, at the BJK Girls’ 16s and 18s National Championships, she reached the final but was defeated in three sets by Clervie Ngounoue.

Awarded a wildcard into the girls' singles at the 2023 US Open, Hui won the tournament by defeating Tereza Valentová in straight sets. She did not lose a set throughout the tournament.

== Professional ==
Awarded a wildcard for the qualifying competition to the 2023 US Open women's singles, Hui lost in the first round to Eugenie Bouchard.

She also received a wildcard for the 2024 San Diego Open for her WTA Tour main-draw debut, but lost in the first round to seventh seed Donna Vekić.

== ITF Circuit finals ==
=== Doubles: 4 (4 titles) ===
Legend
W50 tournaments
W15 tournaments

| Result | W–L | Date | Tournament | Tier | Surface | Partner | Opponents | Score |
|---|---|---|---|---|---|---|---|---|
| Win | 1–0 | Jun 2023 | ITF San Diego, United States | W15 | Hard | (United States) Sara Daavettila | (United States) Malaika Rapolu (Ukraine) Anita Sahdiieva | 7–6^{(4)}, 6–4 |
| Win | 2–0 | Jul 2023 | ITF Irvine, United States | W15 | Hard | (United States) Haley Giavara | (United States) Eryn Cayetano (United States) Isabella Chiv | 6–2, 6–4 |
| Win | 3–0 | Aug 2026 | ITF Badalona, Spain | W15 | Clay | (United States) Anne Christine Lutkemeyer | (Italy) Sonia Cassani (Spain) Gabriela Paun | 6–2, 6–3 |
| Win | 4–0 | Sep 2026 | Berkeley Club Challenge, United States | W50 | Hard | (Venezuela) Sofía Cabezas Domínguez | (Japan) Reina Goto; Evialina Laskevich | 3–6, 6–4, [10–7] |

=== Junior Grand Slam tournament final ===
==== Singles: 1 (title) ====
| Result | Year | Tournament | Surface | Opponent | Score |
|---|---|---|---|---|---|
| Win | 2023 | US Open | Hard | (Czech Republic) Tereza Valentová | 6–4, 6–4 |
