= Abigail Rencheli =

Moldovan-American tennis player (born 2002)

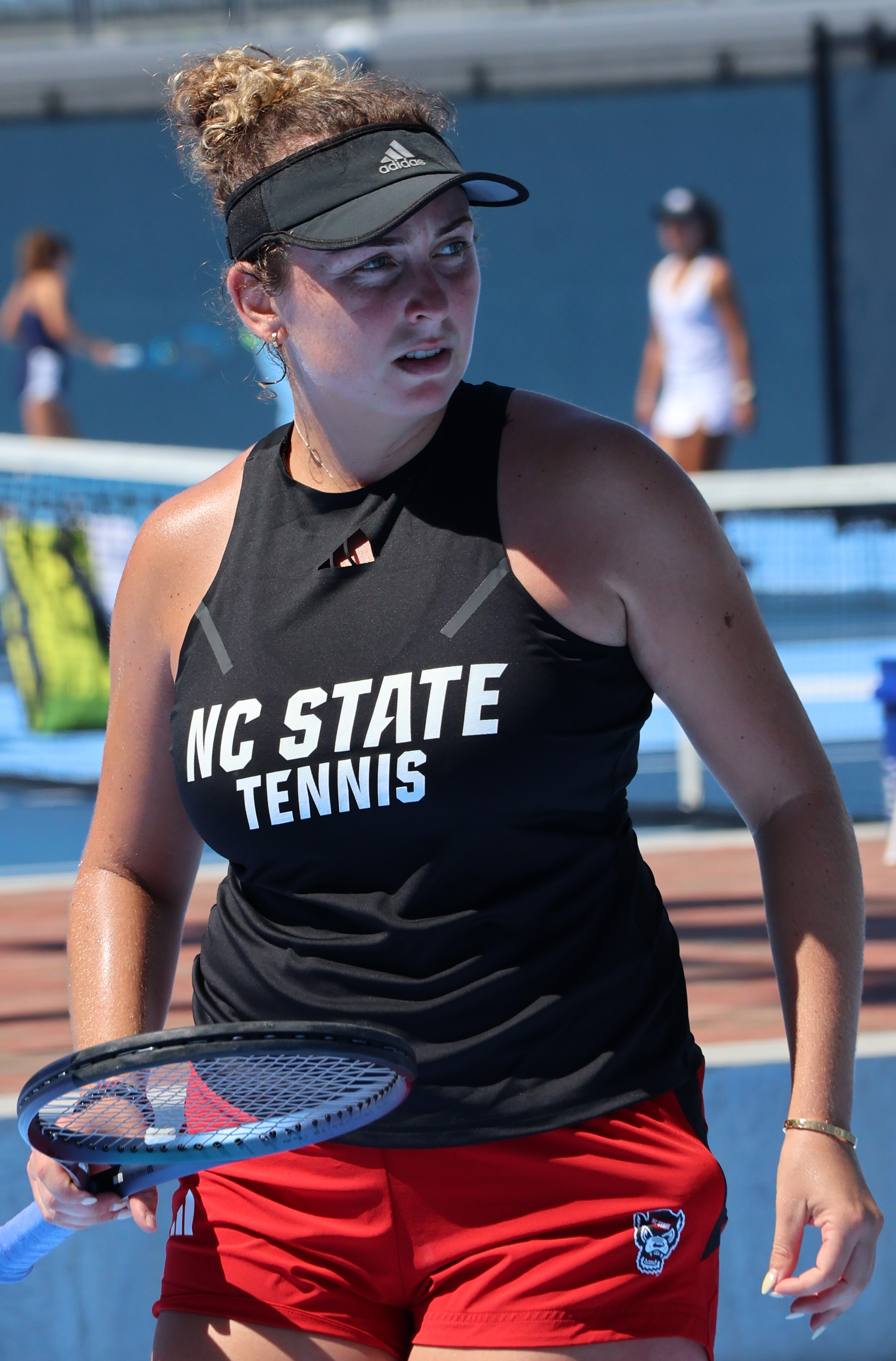
- Rencheli at the 2023 Kitty Harrison Invitational
- Country (sports): Moldova (2019–2022); United States (Oct 2022)
- Born: April 5, 2002 (age 24)
- Plays: Right-handed
- College: NC State
- Prize money: $34,699

Singles
- Career record: 40–41
- Highest ranking: No. 891 (May 4, 2026)
- Current ranking: No. 938 (June 15, 2026)

Doubles
- Career record: 81–27
- Career titles: 10 ITF
- Highest ranking: No. 166 (May 18, 2026)
- Current ranking: No. 170 (June 15, 2026)
- Last updated on: 18 June 2026.

Abigail Rencheli (born April 5, 2002) is a Moldovan-born American tennis player.

She represented Moldova until October 2022, then started playing for the United States.

Rencheli has won 12 doubles titles on the ITF Women's Circuit. On 18 May 2026, she peaked at No. 166 in the doubles rankings of the WTA.

Partnering Alana Smith, Rencheli won her first $60k tournament in July 2023 at Saskatoon, Canada, defeating Stacey Fung and Karman Thandi in the final.

She plays college tennis at North Carolina State.

== ITF Circuit finals ==
=== Doubles: 18 (13 titles, 5 runner-ups) ===
Legend W100 tournaments (1–1) W80 tournaments (1–0) W60/75 tournaments (2–1) W50 tournaments (1–1) W25/35 tournaments (5–2) W15 tournaments (3–0)	Finals by surface Hard (11–2) Clay (2–3)

Result	W–L	Date	Tournament	Tier	Surface	Partner	Opponents	Score
Win	1–0	Aug 2022	ITF Cancún, Mexico	W15	Hard	(South Africa) Gabriella Broadfoot	(Japan) Mao Mushika (Japan) Mio Mushika	6–5 ret.
Win	2–0	Jul 2023	ITF Saskatoon, Canada	W60	Hard	(United States) Alana Smith	(Canada) Stacey Fung (India) Karman Thandi	4–6, 6–4, [10–7]
Loss	2–1	Jul 2023	ITF Feira de Santana, Brazil	W60	Hard	(United States) Haley Giavara	(France) Léolia Jeanjean (Ukraine) Valeriya Strakhova	5–7, 4–6
Win	3–1	Oct 2023	ITF Florence, United States	W25	Hard	(United States) Alana Smith	(United States) Ayana Akli (Israel) Nicole Khirin	3–6, 7–6^{(9)}, [10–6]
Win	4–1	Oct 2023	Tyler Pro Challenge, United States	W80	Hard	(United Kingdom) Amelia Rajecki	(United States) Anna Rogers (United States) Alana Smith	7–5, 4–6, [16–14]
Win	5–1	Oct 2024	ITF Kayseri, Turkey	W35	Hard	(United States) Isabella Barrera Aguirre	(Slovenia) Dalila Jakupović (India) Ankita Raina	6–3, 2–6, [10–6]
Loss	5–2	Jan 2025	ITF Palm Coast, United States	W35	Clay	(United States) Ayana Akli	(Netherlands) Jasmijn Gimbrère (Sweden) Lisa Zaar	4–6, 6–3, [8–10]
Win	6–2	Apr 2025	ITF Monastir, Tunisia	W15	Hard	(United Kingdom) Esther Adeshina	(Germany) Josy Daems (Denmark) Vilma Krebs Hyllested	6–3, 6–7^{(4)}, [10–6]
Win	7–2	Apr 2025	ITF Monastir, Tunisia	W15	Hard	(United States) Hibah Shaikh	(India) Zeel Desai; Anastasiia Gureva	6–4, 6–2
Loss	7–3	May 2025	ITF Indian Harbour Beach, United States	W50	Clay	(United Kingdom) Tara Moore	(United States) Haley Giavara (Australia) Alexandra Osborne	3–6, 6–3, [7–10]
Win	8–3	Jun 2025	Palmetto Pro Open, United States	W75	Hard	(United Kingdom) Tara Moore	(Chinese Taipei) Liang En-shuo (China) Ma Yexin	7–5, 6–2
Win	9–3	Jun 2025	Cary Tennis Classic, United States	W100	Hard	(United States) Ayana Akli	(South Africa) Gabriella Broadfoot (United States) Maddy Zampardo	6–3, 6–2
Win	10–3	Dec 2025	ITF Daytona Beach, United States	W35	Clay	(Estonia) Ingrid Neel	(United States) Anastasia Goncharova (United States) Madison Tattini	6–3, 6–2
Win	11–3	Apr 2026	ITF Boca Raton, United States	W35	Clay	(United States) Savannah Broadus	(Venezuela) Sofía Elena Cabezas Domínguez (United States) Anna Rogers	6–4, 3–6, [10–3]
Loss	11–4	May 2026	ITF Indian Harbour Beach, United States	W100	Clay	(Estonia) Ingrid Neel	(United States) Anna Rogers (United States) Allura Zamarripa	3–6, 0–6
Win	12–4	Jun 2026	Guimarães Ladies Open, Portugal	W50	Hard	(United States) Savannah Broadus	(Slovakia) Viktória Hrunčáková (Slovakia) Katarína Kužmová	6–3, 6–4
Loss	12–5	Oct 2026	ITF Las Vegas, United States	W35	Hard	Maria Sholokhova	(Italy) Diletta Cherubini (Italy) Francesca Pace	6–7^{(5)}, 5–7
Win	13–5	Oct 2026	ITF Redding, United States	W35	Hard	Maria Sholokhova	(United States) Connie Ma (Spain) Berta Passola	2–6, 6–4, [14–12]
