= 2024 Rancho Santa Fe Open – Doubles =

Doubles
- 2024 Rancho Santa Fe Open

Final
- Champions: Maria Kononova; Maria Kozyreva
- Runners-up: (United States) Haley Giavara (United States) Rasheeda McAdoo
- Score: 6–2, 7–6^{(7–4)}

Events
Singles	Doubles
← 2023 ·	Rancho Santa Fe Open	· 2025 →

Makenna Jones and Yulia Starodubtseva were the defending champions, but both chose not to participate.

Maria Kononova and Maria Kozyreva won the title, defeating Haley Giavara and Rasheeda McAdoo in the final; 6–2, 7–6^{(7–4)}.

== Seeds ==
1. (United States) Carmen Corley / Iryna Shymanovich (semifinals)
2. Maria Kononova / Maria Kozyreva (champions)
3. (United States) Haley Giavara / (United States) Rasheeda McAdoo (final)
4. (United States) Elvina Kalieva / (Poland) Katarzyna Kawa (quarterfinals)

== Draw ==
=== Key ===
- Q = Qualifier
- WC = Wild card
- LL = Lucky loser
- Alt = Alternate
- SE = Special exempt
- PR = Protected ranking
- ITF = ITF entry
- JE = Junior exempt
- w/o = Walkover
- r = Retired
- d = Defaulted
- SR = Special ranking

=== Draw ===
First round
1	(United States) C Corley; I Shymanovich	6	6
WC	(Kosovo) V Gjinaj (Mexico) Z Olmos	1	3
(United States) C Campana (United States) E Deming	7^{8}	6
(United States) S León (Slovakia) M Okáľová	6^{6}	2
3	(United States) H Giavara (United States) R McAdoo	6	6^{2}	[13]
(Australia) A Osborne (Thailand) L Tararudee	3	7^{7}	[11]
WC	(United States) A Kratzer (United States) K McKenzie	5	4
(United States) M Iyengar (United States) A Penickova	7	6
WC	(United States) S Colling (United States) K Evans	4	7	[9]
V Miroshnichenko (United States) M Sieg	6	5	[11]
(United States) J DeFalco (United States) G Price	1	1
4	(United States) E Kalieva (Poland) K Kawa	6	6
(United States) M Lewis (United States) B Walker	4	6	[7]
(United States) L Chirico (Australia) M Joint	6	3	[10]
(United States) A Ahn (United States) J Pareja	4	6	[8]
2	M Kononova; M Kozyreva	6	2	[10]

Quarterfinals
1	(United States) C Corley; I Shymanovich	w/o
(United States) C Campana (United States) E Deming
3	(United States) H Giavara (United States) R McAdoo	4	6	[10]
(United States) M Iyengar (United States) A Penickova	6	4	[7]
V Miroshnichenko (United States) M Sieg	6	6
4	(United States) E Kalieva (Poland) K Kawa	3	2
(United States) L Chirico (Australia) M Joint	6	3	[6]
2	M Kononova; M Kozyreva	3	6	[10]

Semifinals
1	(United States) C Corley; I Shymanovich	6^{0}	7	[6]
3	(United States) H Giavara (United States) R McAdoo	7^{7}	5	[10]
V Miroshnichenko (United States) M Sieg	7^{7}	3	[1]
2	M Kononova; M Kozyreva	6^{2}	6	[10]

Final
3	(United States) H Giavara (United States) R McAdoo	2	6^{4}
2	M Kononova; M Kozyreva	6	7^{7}
