= 2023 Rancho Santa Fe Open =

Tennis tournament

- Date: 9–15 October 2023
- Edition: 13th
- Category: ITF Women's World Tennis Tour
- Prize money: $60,000
- Surface: Hard / Outdoor
- Location: Rancho Santa Fe, California, United States

Champions

Singles
- (Ukraine) Yulia Starodubtseva

Doubles
- (United States) Makenna Jones / (Ukraine) Yulia Starodubtseva
← 2022 ·	Rancho Santa Fe Open	· 2024 →

The 2023 Rancho Santa Fe Open is a professional tennis tournament played on outdoor hard courts. It was the thirteenth edition of the tournament which was part of the 2023 ITF Women's World Tennis Tour. It took place in Rancho Santa Fe, California, United States between 9 and 15 October 2023.

== Champions ==
=== Singles ===
- (Ukraine) Yulia Starodubtseva def. (Switzerland) Lulu Sun 7–5, 6–3.

=== Doubles ===
- (United States) Makenna Jones / (Ukraine) Yulia Starodubtseva def. Tatiana Prozorova / (United States) Madison Sieg 6–3, 4–6, [10–6].

== Singles main draw entrants ==
=== Seeds ===
Country	Player	Rank^{1}	Seed
ARG	Julia Riera	160	1
USA	Elvina Kalieva	182	2
	Tatiana Prozorova	201	3
UKR	Yulia Starodubtseva	205	4
USA	Louisa Chirico	216	5
CAN	Stacey Fung	230	6
	Anastasia Tikhonova	236	7
SUI	Lulu Sun	245	8

- ^{1} Rankings are as of 2 October 2023.

=== Other entrants ===
The following players received wildcards into the singles main draw:

- (United States) Ellie Douglas
- (United States) Kylie McKenzie
- (United States) Madison Sieg

The following player received entry using a junior exempt:

- (China) Tian Fangran

The following player received entry as a special exempt:

- (Japan) Sayaka Ishii

The following players received entry from the qualifying draw:

- (United States) Eryn Cayetano
- (United States) Paris Corley
- (China) Han Jiangxue
- (United States) Kimmi Hance
- Maria Kozyreva
- (Vietnam) Savanna Lý-Nguyễn
- (United States) Megan McCray
- (Germany) Nicole Rivkin

The following players received entry as lucky losers:

- (United States) Alyssa Ahn
- (United States) Tori Kinard
