= 2021 Rancho Santa Fe Open =

Tennis tournament

- Date: 11–17 October 2021
- Edition: 11th
- Category: ITF Women's World Tennis Tour
- Prize money: $60,000
- Surface: Hard
- Location: Rancho Santa Fe, California, United States

Champions

Singles
- (Sweden) Rebecca Peterson

Doubles
- (Poland) Katarzyna Kawa / (Slovakia) Tereza Mihalíková
← 2020 ·	Rancho Santa Fe Open	· 2022 →

The 2021 Rancho Santa Fe Open was a professional women's tennis tournament played on outdoor hard courts. It was the eleventh edition of the tournament which was part of the 2021 ITF Women's World Tennis Tour. It took place in Rancho Santa Fe, California, United States between 11 and 17 October 2021.

== Singles main-draw entrants ==
=== Seeds ===
Country	Player	Rank^{1}	Seed
SWE	Rebecca Peterson	76	1
FRA	Fiona Ferro	83	2
USA	Madison Brengle	88	3
KAZ	Zarina Diyas	108	4
JPN	Misaki Doi	109	5
SVK	Kristína Kučová	112	6
MEX	Renata Zarazúa	118	7
SLO	Polona Hercog	123	8

- ^{1} Rankings are as of 4 October 2021.

=== Other entrants ===
The following players received wildcards into the singles main draw:

- (United States) Hanna Chang
- (United States) Kayla Day
- (United States) Jessica Failla
- (United States) Allie Kiick

The following player received entry using a protected ranking:

- (Australia) Priscilla Hon

The following player received entry as a junior exempt:

- (France) Elsa Jacquemot

The following player received entry as a special exempt:

- (United States) Emina Bektas

The following players received entry from the qualifying draw:

- (United States) Ellie Douglas
- (United States) Haley Giavara
- (United States) Dalayna Hewitt
- (United States) Elvina Kalieva
- (United States) Ashlyn Krueger
- (United States) Maegan Manasse
- (Slovakia) Tereza Mihalíková
- (France) Marine Partaud

== Champions ==
=== Singles ===
- (Sweden) Rebecca Peterson def. (United States) Elvina Kalieva, 6–4, 6–0.

=== Doubles ===
- (Poland) Katarzyna Kawa / (Slovakia) Tereza Mihalíková def. (Chinese Taipei) Liang En-shuo / (Canada) Rebecca Marino, 6–3, 4–6, [10–6].
