= 2023 Open ITF Arcadis Brezo Osuna =

Tennis tournament

- Date: 12–18 June 2023
- Edition: 9th
- Category: ITF Women's World Tennis Tour
- Prize money: $60,000
- Surface: Hard / Outdoor
- Location: Madrid, Spain

Champions

Singles
- Tatiana Prozorova

Doubles
- (United States) Makenna Jones / (United States) Jamie Loeb
- Open ITF Arcadis Brezo Osuna

The 2023 Open ITF Arcadis Brezo Osuna was a professional tennis tournament played on outdoor hard courts. It was the ninth edition of the tournament, which was part of the 2023 ITF Women's World Tennis Tour. It took place in Madrid, Spain, between 12 and 18 June 2023.

== Champions ==
=== Singles ===
- Tatiana Prozorova def. (Spain) Marta Soriano Santiago, 6–3, 6–1

=== Doubles ===
- (United States) Makenna Jones / (United States) Jamie Loeb def. (Australia) Destanee Aiava / (Turkey) Berfu Cengiz, 6–4, 5–7, [10–6]

== Singles main draw entrants ==
=== Seeds ===
Country	Player	Rank	Seed
AUS	Jaimee Fourlis	152	1
USA	Robin Montgomery	167	2
CHN	Bai Zhuoxuan	205	3
NED	Arianne Hartono	220	4
FRA	Harmony Tan	237	5
USA	Jamie Loeb	241	6
JPN	Sakura Hosogi	247	7
TUR	Berfu Cengiz	249	8
	Tatiana Prozorova	279	9
UKR	Kateryna Volodko	302	10
HKG	Adithya Karunaratne	318	11
AUS	Destanee Aiava	320	12
BIH	Nefisa Berberović	322	13
FIN	Anastasia Kulikova	341	14
	Jana Kolodynska	352	15
LTU	Justina Mikulskytė	365	16

- Rankings are as of 29 May 2023.

=== Other entrants ===
The following players received wildcards into the singles main draw:

- (Spain) Marina Benito
- (Spain) Noelia Bouzó Zanotti
- (Spain) Carolina Gómez
- (Spain) Lidia Moreno Arias
- (Spain) Marta Soriano Santiago

The following players received entry from the qualifying draw:

- (Romania) Karola Patricia Bejenaru
- (France) Julie Belgraver
- (France) Flavie Brugnone
- (Sweden) Jacqueline Cabaj Awad
- (China) Mi Tianmi
- Kira Pavlova
- (Switzerland) Sebastianna Scilipoti
- (Slovakia) Katarína Strešnáková

The following player received entry as a lucky loser:

- (Argentina) Lucía Peyre
