= 2024 Rancho Santa Fe Open =

Tennis tournament

- Date: 30 September–6 October 2024
- Edition: 14th
- Category: ITF Women's World Tennis Tour
- Prize money: $60,000
- Surface: Hard / Outdoor
- Location: Rancho Santa Fe, California, United States

2023 Champions

Singles
- (Ukraine) Yulia Starodubtseva

Doubles
- (United States) Makenna Jones / (Ukraine) Yulia Starodubtseva
| ← 2023 · | Rancho Santa Fe Open | · 2025 → |

The 2024 Rancho Santa Fe Open is a professional tennis tournament played on outdoor hard courts. It was the fourteenth edition of the tournament which was part of the 2024 ITF Women's World Tennis Tour. It took place in Rancho Santa Fe, California, United States between 30 September and 6 October 2024.

== Champions ==
=== Singles ===
- vs.

=== Doubles ===
- / vs. /

== Singles main draw entrants ==
=== Seeds ===
| Country | Player | Rank^{1} | Seed |
|---|---|---|---|
| AUS | Maya Joint | 113 | 1 |
| CAN | Rebecca Marino | 133 | 2 |
| JPN | Ena Shibahara | 154 | 3 |
| ~~USA~~ | ~~Kayla Day~~ | ~~170~~ | ~~4~~ |
| THA | Lanlana Tararudee | 179 | 5 |
| USA | Elizabeth Mandlik | 185 | 6 |
| CZE | Gabriela Knutson | 195 | 7 |
| USA | Hanna Chang | 196 | 8 |

- ^{1} Rankings are as of 23 September 2024.

=== Other entrants ===
The following players received wildcards into the singles main draw:

- (United States) Ashley Kratzer
- (Ukraine) Anastasiya Lopata
- (United States) Julieta Pareja
- (United States) Annika Penickova

The following players received entry from the qualifying draw:

- (United States) Carolyn Campana
- (United States) Solymar Colling
- (United States) Lauren Davis
- (United States) Kailey Evans
- (United States) Haley Giavara
- (United States) Rasheeda McAdoo
- (China) Mi Lan
- (United States) Gabriella Price

The following player received entry as a lucky loser:

- (United States) Tori Kinard
