= 2021 Rancho Santa Fe Open – Doubles =

Doubles
- 2021 Rancho Santa Fe Open

Final
- Champions: (Poland) Katarzyna Kawa (Slovakia) Tereza Mihalíková
- Runners-up: (Chinese Taipei) Liang En-shuo (Canada) Rebecca Marino
- Score: 6–3, 4–6, [10–6]

Events
Singles	Doubles
← 2020 ·	Rancho Santa Fe Open	· 2022 →

Kayla Day and Sophia Whittle were the defending champions but chose not to participate.

Katarzyna Kawa and Tereza Mihalíková won the title, defeating Liang En-shuo and Rebecca Marino in the final, 6–3, 4–6, [10–6].

== Seeds ==
1. (Poland) Katarzyna Kawa / (Slovakia) Tereza Mihalíková (champions)
2. (Chinese Taipei) Liang En-shuo / (Canada) Rebecca Marino (final)
3. (Switzerland) Conny Perrin / (Mexico) Renata Zarazúa (quarterfinals)
4. (United States) Madison Brengle / (Australia) Maddison Inglis (semifinals)

== Draw ==
=== Key ===
- Q = Qualifier
- WC = Wild card
- LL = Lucky loser
- Alt = Alternate
- SE = Special exempt
- PR = Protected ranking
- ITF = ITF entry
- JE = Junior exempt
- w/o = Walkover
- r = Retired
- d = Defaulted
- SR = Special ranking

=== Draw ===
First round
1	(Poland) K Kawa (Slovakia) T Mihalíková	6	6
(Canada) A Broomfield (United States) H Verner	4	1
(Switzerland) T Arnold (Thailand) B Thamchaiwat	6	4	[9]
(Switzerland) L Küng (Australia) A Osborne	3	6	[11]
4	(United States) M Brengle (Australia) M Inglis	6	6
(Czech Republic) L Pulchartová (Japan) R Ushijima	3	2
(France) F Ferro (France) E Jacquemot
(United States) E Kalieva (United States) A Krueger	w/o
(United States) A Kulikov (United States) R Valdes	2	7	[10]
(United States) J Aney (United States) H Chang	6	5	[6]
(Australia) L Cabrera (Australia) P Hon	7^{7}	6^{6}	[5]
3	(Switzerland) C Perrin (Mexico) R Zarazúa	6^{5}	7^{8}	[10]
WC	(United States) S Colling (United States) E Goldsmith	2	7	[10]
(United States) H Giavara (United States) D Hewitt	6	5	[8]
(United States) E Oosterhout (France) M Partaud	2	4
2	(Chinese Taipei) E-s Liang (Canada) R Marino	6	6

Quarterfinals
1	(Poland) K Kawa (Slovakia) T Mihalíková	6	6
(Switzerland) L Küng (Australia) A Osborne	3	2
4	(United States) M Brengle (Australia) M Inglis	6	6
(United States) E Kalieva (United States) A Krueger	3	0
(United States) A Kulikov (United States) R Valdes	6	3	[10]
3	(Switzerland) C Perrin (Mexico) R Zarazúa	3	6	[8]
WC	(United States) S Colling (United States) E Goldsmith	6^{5}	1
2	(Chinese Taipei) E-s Liang (Canada) R Marino	7^{7}	6

Semifinals
1	(Poland) K Kawa (Slovakia) T Mihalíková	6	6
4	(United States) M Brengle (Australia) M Inglis	3	4
(United States) A Kulikov (United States) R Valdes	6	5	[8]
2	(Chinese Taipei) E-s Liang (Canada) R Marino	0	7	[10]

Final
1	(Poland) K Kawa (Slovakia) T Mihalíková	6	4	[10]
2	(Chinese Taipei) E-s Liang (Canada) R Marino	3	6	[6]
