= 2025 China Open – Women's singles =

Women's singles
- 2025 China Open

Final
- Champion: (United States) Amanda Anisimova
- Runner-up: (Czech Republic) Linda Nosková
- Score: 6–0, 2–6, 6–2

Details
- Draw: 96 (12 Q / 8 WC )
- Seeds: 32

Events
Singles	men	women
Doubles	men	women
- China Open

Amanda Anisimova defeated Linda Nosková in the final, 6–0, 2–6, 6–2 to win the women's singles tennis title at the 2025 China Open. It was her second WTA 1000 title and fourth career WTA Tour title.

Coco Gauff was the defending champion, but lost in the semifinals to Anisimova.

== Seeds ==
All seeds received a bye into the second round.

1. (Poland) Iga Świątek (fourth round)
2. (United States) Coco Gauff (semifinals)
3. (United States) Amanda Anisimova (champion)
4. Mirra Andreeva (fourth round)
5. (United States) Jessica Pegula (semifinals)
6. (Italy) Jasmine Paolini (quarterfinals)
7. (China) Zheng Qinwen (third round, retired)
8. (Kazakhstan) Elena Rybakina (third round)
9. Ekaterina Alexandrova (second round)
10. (Denmark) Clara Tauson (second round)
11. (Ukraine) Elina Svitolina (withdrew)
12. (Japan) Naomi Osaka (second round)
13. (Czech Republic) Karolína Muchová (fourth round)
14. (Australia) Daria Kasatkina (second round)
15. (Switzerland) Belinda Bencic (fourth round)
16. (United States) Emma Navarro (quarterfinals)
17. Diana Shnaider (second round)
18. (Spain) Paula Badosa (third round, retired)
19. Liudmila Samsonova (second round)
20. (Belgium) Elise Mertens (second round)
21. (Canada) Victoria Mboko (second round)
22. (Latvia) Jeļena Ostapenko (second round)
23. (Ukraine) Marta Kostyuk (fourth round)
24. Veronika Kudermetova (third round)
25. (Canada) Leylah Fernandez (third round)
26. (Czech Republic) Linda Nosková (final)
27. (United States) Sofia Kenin (third round)
28. Anna Kalinskaya (second round)
29. (Ukraine) Dayana Yastremska (second round)
30. (United Kingdom) Emma Raducanu (third round)
31. (China) Wang Xinyu (second round)
32. (United States) Iva Jovic (second round)
33. (Poland) Magda Linette (second round)

Click on the seed number of a player to go to their draw section.

== Draw ==
Key

- Q = Qualifier
- WC = Wild card
- LL = Lucky loser
- Alt = Alternate
- ITF = ITF entry
- PR = Protected ranking
- SR = Special ranking
- SE = Special exempt
- JE = Junior exempt
- JR = Junior Accelerator Programme entrant
- CO = College Accelerator Programme entrant
- NG = Next Gen Accelerator Program entrant
- w/o = Walkover
- r = Retired
- d = Defaulted

=== Finals ===
Quarterfinals
16	(United States) Emma Navarro	7^{7}	2	1
5	(United States) Jessica Pegula	6^{2}	6	6
(United Kingdom) Sonay Kartal	3	4
26	(Czech Republic) Linda Nosková	6	6
6	(Italy) Jasmine Paolini	7^{7}	3	4
3	(United States) Amanda Anisimova	6^{4}	6	6
(Germany) Eva Lys	3	4
2	(United States) Coco Gauff	6	6

Semifinals
5	(United States) Jessica Pegula	3	6	6^{6}
26	(Czech Republic) Linda Nosková	6	1	7^{8}
3	(United States) Amanda Anisimova	6	6
2	(United States) Coco Gauff	1	2

Final
26	(Czech Republic) Linda Nosková	0	6	2
3	(United States) Amanda Anisimova	6	2	6

=== Top half ===
==== Section 1 ====
First round
WC	(China) Y Yuan	6	6
(Kazakhstan) Y Putintseva	3	3
(United States) A Li	5	7^{7}	5
(Colombia) C Osorio	7	6^{5}	7
(France) L Boisson	7^{8}	5	6
Q	(Hungary) D Gálfi	6^{6}	7	2
(Slovakia) R Šramková	2	2
(Romania) E-G Ruse	6	6

Second round
1	(Poland) I Świątek	6	6
WC	(China) Y Yuan	0	3
(Colombia) C Osorio	6	4	6
28	A Kalinskaya	1	6	4
19	L Samsonova	3	4
(France) L Boisson	6	6
(Romania) E-G Ruse	3	6^{0}
16	(United States) E Navarro	6	7^{7}

Third round
1	(Poland) I Świątek	6	0
(Colombia) C Osorio	0	0^{r}
(France) L Boisson	2	0^{r}
16	(United States) E Navarro	6	1

Fourth round
1	(Poland) I Świątek	4	6	0
16	(United States) E Navarro	6	4	6

==== Section 2 ====
First round
Q	A Sasnovich	6^{4}	7	6
Q	(Indonesia) J Tjen	7^{7}	5	1
(Poland) M Fręch	5	4
Q	(Germany) E Seidel	7	6
(Croatia) D Vekić	2	4
Q	(Spain) C Bucșa	6	6
(Australia) A Tomljanović	7^{7}	6
(Ukraine) Y Starodubtseva	6^{1}	2

Second round
12	(Japan) N Osaka	6	4	2
Q	A Sasnovich	1	6	6
Q	(Germany) E Seidel	1	1
23	(Ukraine) M Kostyuk	6	6
30	(United Kingdom) E Raducanu	6	6
Q	(Spain) C Bucșa	3	3
(Australia) A Tomljanović	0	3
5	(United States) J Pegula	6	6

Third round
Q	A Sasnovich	4	2
23	(Ukraine) M Kostyuk	6	6
30	(United Kingdom) E Raducanu	6	6^{9}	0
5	(United States) J Pegula	3	7^{11}	6

Fourth round
23	(Ukraine) M Kostyuk	3	7^{7}	1
5	(United States) J Pegula	6	6^{4}	6

==== Section 3 ====
First round
Q	(Japan) M Uchijima	1	3
WC	(China) L Zhu	6	6
(Spain) J Bouzas Maneiro	6	6
(Romania) J Cristian	4	0
Q	(Andorra) V Jiménez Kasintseva	3	2
(Australia) M Joint	6	6
(United Kingdom) S Kartal	6	6
(United States) A Parks	3	2

Second round
4	M Andreeva	6	6
WC	(China) L Zhu	2	2
(Spain) J Bouzas Maneiro	7	6
29	(Ukraine) D Yastremska	5	4
17	D Shnaider	5	1
(Australia) M Joint	7	6
(United Kingdom) S Kartal	6	6
14	(Australia) D Kasatkina	3	0

Third round
4	M Andreeva	6	6
(Spain) J Bouzas Maneiro	4	1
(Australia) M Joint	3	2
(United Kingdom) S Kartal	6	6

Fourth round
4	M Andreeva	5	6	5
(United Kingdom) S Kartal	7	2	7

==== Section 4 ====
First round
(Turkey) Z Sönmez	6	6
WC	(China) S Wei	2	0
(Czech Republic) K Siniaková	3	4
A Potapova	6	6
WC	(China) H Guo	5	1
WC	(China) Xiy Wang	7	6
(Netherlands) S Lamens	3	3
LL	(Colombia) E Arango	6	6

Second round
10	(Denmark) C Tauson	4	6	3
(Turkey) Z Sönmez	6	2	6
A Potapova	7^{7}	7
21	(Canada) V Mboko	6^{5}	5
26	(Czech Republic) L Nosková	6	6
WC	(China) Xiy Wang	3	2
LL	(Colombia) E Arango	3	2
7	(China) Q Zheng	6	6

Third round
(Turkey) Z Sönmez	3	5
A Potapova	6	7
26	(Czech Republic) L Nosková	6	3	3
7	(China) Q Zheng	4	6	0^{r}

Fourth round
A Potapova	2	4
26	(Czech Republic) L Nosková	6	6

=== Bottom half ===
==== Section 5 ====
First round
PR	(Latvia) A Sevastova	6	7^{7}
(Australia) K Birrell	3	6^{1}
P Kudermetova	7	7^{9}
Q	(Australia) M Inglis	5	6^{7}
Q	(Hungary) A Bondár	6	7^{7}
PR	(Canada) B Andreescu	4	6^{4}
(Germany) T Maria	2	4
(Czech Republic) M Bouzková	6	6

Second round
6	(Italy) J Paolini	6	6
PR	(Latvia) A Sevastova	1	3
P Kudermetova	4	2
27	(United States) S Kenin	6	6
24	V Kudermetova	7	6
Q	(Hungary) A Bondár	5	3
(Czech Republic) M Bouzková	7	7
33	(Poland) M Linette	5	5

Third round
6	(Italy) J Paolini	6	6
27	(United States) S Kenin	3	0
24	V Kudermetova	3	5
(Czech Republic) M Bouzková	6	7

Fourth round
6	(Italy) J Paolini	6	7
(Czech Republic) M Bouzková	2	5

==== Section 6 ====
First round
(United States) C Dolehide	2	3
(Romania) S Cîrstea	6	6
LL	(France) E Jacquemot	3	3
(Croatia) A Ružić	6	6
Q	A Zakharova	6	1	4
WC	(China) S Zhang	3	6	6
(United Kingdom) K Boulter	7	5	6
(United States) H Baptiste	5	7	4

Second round
13	(Czech Republic) K Muchová	6	6
(Romania) S Cîrstea	2	3
(Croatia) A Ružić	3	6^{2}
18	(Spain) P Badosa	6	7^{7}
31	(China) Xin Wang	4	2
WC	(China) S Zhang	6	6
(United Kingdom) K Boulter	1	3
3	(United States) A Anisimova	6	6

Third round
13	(Czech Republic) K Muchová	4
18	(Spain) P Badosa	2^{r}
WC	(China) S Zhang	6^{11}	0
3	(United States) A Anisimova	7^{13}	6

Fourth round
13	(Czech Republic) K Muchová	6	2	4
3	(United States) A Anisimova	1	6	6

==== Section 7 ====
First round
(Germany) L Siegemund	4	2
PR	(United States) C McNally	6	6
WC	(China) R Zhang	1	0
(Germany) E Lys	6	6
(United States) M Kessler	6	7^{7}
WC	(China) H Shi	2	6^{5}
(Czech Republic) B Krejčíková	6	6
A Blinkova	2	2

Second round
8	(Kazakhstan) E Rybakina	7	4	6
PR	(United States) C McNally	5	6	3
(Germany) E Lys	6	4	7
32	(United States) I Jovic	3	6	5
20	(Belgium) E Mertens	2	4
(United States) M Kessler	6	6
(Czech Republic) B Krejčíková	7	6
9	E Alexandrova	5	2

Third round
8	(Kazakhstan) E Rybakina	3	6	4
(Germany) E Lys	6	1	6
(United States) M Kessler	1	7	3
(Czech Republic) B Krejčíková	6	5	0^{r}

Fourth round
(Germany) E Lys	4	6	6
(United States) M Kessler	6	1	2

==== Section 8 ====
First round
Q	(United States) K Volynets	6	2	6
(United States) P Stearns	4	6	3
Q	(Australia) P Hon	1	6	7^{7}
(Switzerland) V Golubic	6	3	6^{4}
(United States) A Krueger	6^{5}	7^{7}	5
(Greece) M Sakkari	7^{7}	6^{5}	7
(Italy) L Bronzetti	4	1
K Rakhimova	6	6

Second round
15	(Switzerland) B Bencic	6	6
Q	(United States) K Volynets	3	3
Q	(Australia) P Hon	6	6
22	(Latvia) J Ostapenko	3	2
25	(Canada) L Fernandez	6	6
(Greece) M Sakkari	2	0
K Rakhimova	4	0
2	(United States) C Gauff	6	6

Third round
15	(Switzerland) B Bencic	4	6	6
Q	(Australia) P Hon	6	4	3
25	(Canada) L Fernandez	4	6	5
2	(United States) C Gauff	6	4	7

Fourth round
15	(Switzerland) B Bencic	6	6^{4}	2
2	(United States) C Gauff	4	7^{7}	6

== Seeded players ==
The following are the seeded players. Seedings are based on WTA rankings as of 15 September 2025. Rankings and points before are as of 22 September 2025.

Seed	Rank	Player	Points before	Points defending	Points won	Points after	Status
1	2	(Poland) Iga Świątek	8,433	0	120	8,553	Fourth round lost to (United States) Emma Navarro [16]
2	3	(United States) Coco Gauff	7,873	1,000	390	7,263	Semifinals lost to (United States) Amanda Anisimova [3]
3	4	(United States) Amanda Anisimova	5,109	120	1,000	5,989	Champion, defeated (Czech Republic) Linda Nosková [26]
4	5	Mirra Andreeva	4,793	215	120	4,698	Fourth round lost to (United Kingdom) Sonay Kartal
5	7	(United States) Jessica Pegula	4,383	120	390	4,653	Semifinals lost to (Czech Republic) Linda Nosková [26]
6	8	(Italy) Jasmine Paolini	4,006	65	215	4,156	Quarterfinals lost to (United States) Amanda Anisimova [3]
7	9	(China) Zheng Qinwen	4,003	390	65	3,678	Third round retired against (Czech Republic) Linda Nosková [26]
8	10	(Kazakhstan) Elena Rybakina	3,833	0	65	3,898	Third round lost to (Germany) Eva Lys
9	11	Ekaterina Alexandrova	3,253	10	10	3,253	Second round lost to (Czech Republic) Barbora Krejčíková
10	12	(Denmark) Clara Tauson	2,775	35+81	10+54	2,723	Second round lost to (Turkey) Zeynep Sönmez
11	13	(Ukraine) Elina Svitolina	2,606	0	0	2,606	Withdrew due to hip injury
12	14	(Japan) Naomi Osaka	2,489	120	10	2,379	Second round lost to Aliaksandra Sasnovich [Q]
13	15	(Czech Republic) Karolína Muchová	2,488	650	120	1,958	Fourth round lost to (United States) Amanda Anisimova [3]
14	20	(Australia) Daria Kasatkina	2,106	65	10	2,051	Second round lost to (United Kingdom) Sonay Kartal
15	16	(Switzerland) Belinda Bencic	2,334	(1)^{†}	120	2,453	Fourth round lost to (United States) Coco Gauff [2]
16	17	(United States) Emma Navarro	2,310	10	215	2,515	Quarterfinals lost to (United States) Jessica Pegula [5]
17	19	Diana Shnaider	2,111	65	10	2,056	Second round lost to (Australia) Maya Joint
18	18	(Spain) Paula Badosa	2,195	390	65	1,870	Third round retired against (Czech Republic) Karolína Muchová [13]
19	21	Liudmila Samsonova	2,049	10	10	2,049	Second round lost to (France) Loïs Boisson
20	22	(Belgium) Elise Mertens	2,019	65	10	1,964	Second round lost to (United States) McCartney Kessler
21	23	(Canada) Victoria Mboko	1,841	(23)^{‡}	10	1,828	Second round lost to Anastasia Potapova
22	24	(Latvia) Jeļena Ostapenko	1,780	0	10	1,790	Second round lost to (Australia) Priscilla Hon [Q]
23	28	(Ukraine) Marta Kostyuk	1,659	10	120	1,769	Fourth round lost to (United States) Jessica Pegula [5]
24	30	Veronika Kudermetova	1,563	65	65	1,563	Third round lost to (Czech Republic) Marie Bouzková
25	25	(Canada) Leylah Fernandez	1,684	10	65	1,739	Third round lost to (United States) Coco Gauff [2]
26	27	(Czech Republic) Linda Nosková	1,670	(10)^{§}	650	2,310	Runner-up, lost to (United States) Amanda Anisimova [3]
27	26	(United States) Sofia Kenin	1,678	35	65	1,708	Third round lost to (Italy) Jasmine Paolini [6]
28	29	Anna Kalinskaya	1,582	120	10	1,472	Second round lost to (Colombia) Camila Osorio
29	31	(Ukraine) Dayana Yastremska	1,559	10	10	1,559	Second round lost to (Spain) Jéssica Bouzas Maneiro
30	32	(United Kingdom) Emma Raducanu	1,498	0	65	1,563	Third round lost to (United States) Jessica Pegula [5]
31	34	(China) Wang Xinyu	1,461	35	10	1,436	Second round lost to (China) Zhang Shuai [WC]
32	37	(United States) Iva Jovic	1,413	(35+75)^{‡}	10+1	1,314	Second round lost to (Germany) Eva Lys
33	38	(Poland) Magda Linette	1,404	120	10	1,294	Second round lost to (Czech Republic) Marie Bouzková

† The player did not qualify for the tournament in 2024. Points for her 18th best result will be deducted instead.
‡ The player did not qualify for the tournament in 2024. She is defending points from one or more ITF tournaments (Berkeley and/or Rancho Santa Fe) instead.
§ The player withdrew from the 2024 tournament but was not required to carry a 0-point penalty in her ranking due to a long-term injury exemption. Points from her 6th best combined WTA 1000 result will be deducted instead.

=== Withdrawn seeded players ===
The following players would have been seeded, but withdrew before the tournament began.

Rank	Player	Points before	Points dropping	Points after	Withdrawal reason
1	Aryna Sabalenka	11,225	215	11,010	Minor injury
6	(United States) Madison Keys	4,579	120	4,459	Shoulder injury
40	(Brazil) Beatriz Haddad Maia	1,335	65	1,270	Personal reasons

== Other entry information ==
=== Wildcards ===
- (China) Guo Hanyu
- (China) Shi Han
- (China) Wang Xiyu
- (China) Wei Sijia
- (China) Yuan Yue
- (China) Zhang Ruien
- (China) Zhang Shuai
- (China) Zhu Lin

=== Protected ranking ===
- (Canada) Bianca Andreescu
- (United States) Caty McNally
- (Latvia) Anastasija Sevastova
- ~~(China) Wang Yafan~~

=== Withdrawals ===
- ‡ (United States) Danielle Collins → replaced by (United States) Iva Jovic
- ‡ (Serbia) Olga Danilović → replaced by Anna Blinkova
- ‡ (Brazil) Beatriz Haddad Maia → replaced by (Australia) Ajla Tomljanović
- ‡ (United States) Madison Keys → replaced by (Turkey) Zeynep Sönmez
- ‡ Anastasia Pavlyuchenkova → replaced by (Czech Republic) Kateřina Siniaková
- ‡ Aryna Sabalenka → replaced by (United States) Caroline Dolehide
- § (Ukraine) Elina Svitolina → replaced by (France) Elsa Jacquemot (LL)
- ‡ (Czech Republic) Markéta Vondroušová → replaced by (Australia) Kimberly Birrell
- § (China) Wang Yafan → replaced by (Colombia) Emiliana Arango (LL)

‡ – withdrew from entry list
§ – withdrew from main draw

== Qualifying ==
=== Seeds ===
1. (Colombia) Emiliana Arango (qualifying competition, lucky loser)
2. (France) Elsa Jacquemot (qualifying competition, lucky loser)
3. (Spain) Cristina Bucșa (qualified)
4. Anastasia Zakharova (qualified)
5. (France) Varvara Gracheva (first round)
6. (Italy) Elisabetta Cocciaretto (qualifying competition)
7. (Japan) Moyuka Uchijima (qualified)
8. (France) Léolia Jeanjean (first round)
9. (Hungary) Anna Bondár (qualified)
10. (Bulgaria) Viktoriya Tomova (qualifying competition)
11. (Hungary) Dalma Gálfi (qualified)
12. (Slovenia) Veronika Erjavec (first round)
13. (France) Diane Parry (qualifying competition)
14. (Indonesia) Janice Tjen (qualified)
15. (Germany) Ella Seidel (qualified)
16. (United States) Katie Volynets (qualified)
17. (Australia) Priscilla Hon (qualified)
18. (Andorra) Victoria Jiménez Kasintseva (qualified)
19. (Belgium) Greet Minnen (qualifying competition)
20. (Switzerland) Rebeka Masarova (qualifying competition)
21. (Poland) Katarzyna Kawa (qualifying competition)
22. (Argentina) María Lourdes Carlé (qualifying competition)
23. Aliaksandra Sasnovich (qualified)
24. (Chinese Taipei) Joanna Garland (qualifying competition)

=== Qualifiers ===
1. (Germany) Ella Seidel
2. (Andorra) Victoria Jiménez Kasintseva
3. (Spain) Cristina Bucșa
4. Anastasia Zakharova
5. (United States) Katie Volynets
6. (Australia) Priscilla Hon
7. (Japan) Moyuka Uchijima
8. Aliaksandra Sasnovich
9. (Hungary) Anna Bondár
10. (Indonesia) Janice Tjen
11. (Hungary) Dalma Gálfi
12. (Australia) Maddison Inglis

=== Lucky losers ===
1. (France) Elsa Jacquemot
2. (Colombia) Emiliana Arango

=== Qualifying draw ===
==== First qualifier ====
First round
1	(Colombia) Emiliana Arango	6	6
WC	(China) Shao Yushan	4	2
(France) Jessika Ponchet	4	3
15	(Germany) Ella Seidel	6	6

Qualifying competition
1	(Colombia) Emiliana Arango	4	5
15	(Germany) Ella Seidel	6	7

==== Second qualifier ====
First round
2	(France) Elsa Jacquemot	7	6
(Australia) Destanee Aiava	5	2
WC	(China) Li Zongyu	3	3
18	(Andorra) Victoria Jiménez Kasintseva	6	6

Qualifying competition
2	(France) Elsa Jacquemot	3	2
18	(Andorra) Victoria Jiménez Kasintseva	6	6

==== Third qualifier ====
First round
3	(Spain) Cristina Bucșa	6	6
(United States) Clervie Ngounoue	2	3
WC	(China) Ren Yufei	1	2
22	(Argentina) María Lourdes Carlé	6	6

Qualifying competition
3	(Spain) Cristina Bucșa	7	6
22	(Argentina) María Lourdes Carlé	5	4

==== Fourth qualifier ====
First round
4	Anastasia Zakharova	6	6
(Australia) Arina Rodionova	4	1
Maria Timofeeva	6	6^{5}	2
19	(Belgium) Greet Minnen	3	7^{7}	6

Qualifying competition
4	Anastasia Zakharova	6	6
19	(Belgium) Greet Minnen	2	1

==== Fifth qualifier ====
First round
5	(France) Varvara Gracheva	6^{6}	4
(Thailand) Lanlana Tararudee	7^{8}	6
(Australia) Astra Sharma	2	0
16	(United States) Katie Volynets	6	6

Qualifying competition
(Thailand) Lanlana Tararudee	6	6^{4}	3
16	(United States) Katie Volynets	3	7^{7}	6

==== Sixth qualifier ====
First round
6	(Italy) Elisabetta Cocciaretto	6	6
(France) Chloé Paquet	4	1
(Japan) Ena Shibahara	6	5	1
17	(Australia) Priscilla Hon	3	7	6

Qualifying competition
6	(Italy) Elisabetta Cocciaretto	2	4
17	(Australia) Priscilla Hon	6	6

==== Seventh qualifier ====
First round
7	(Japan) Moyuka Uchijima	6	6
WC	(China) Jiang Xinyu	4	3
WC	(China) Yao Xinxin	2	6	3
24	(Chinese Taipei) Joanna Garland	6	4	6

Qualifying competition
7	(Japan) Moyuka Uchijima	6	2	6
24	(Chinese Taipei) Joanna Garland	2	6	1

==== Eighth qualifier ====
First round
8	(France) Léolia Jeanjean	3	6	3
(United States) Varvara Lepchenko	6	4	6
Tatiana Prozorova	4	1
23	Aliaksandra Sasnovich	6	6

Qualifying competition
(United States) Varvara Lepchenko	4	1
23	Aliaksandra Sasnovich	6	6

==== Ninth qualifier ====
First round
9	(Hungary) Anna Bondár	7^{10}	6
WC	(China) Zhu Chenting	6^{8}	2
PR	Darya Astakhova	2	2
13	(France) Diane Parry	6	6

Qualifying competition
9	(Hungary) Anna Bondár	6	6
13	(France) Diane Parry	0	4

==== Tenth qualifier ====
First round
10	(Bulgaria) Viktoriya Tomova	6	7^{7}
(United States) Whitney Osuigwe	3	6^{2}
(Italy) Lucrezia Stefanini	4	3
14	(Indonesia) Janice Tjen	6	6

Qualifying competition
10	(Bulgaria) Viktoriya Tomova	2	6^{2}
14	(Indonesia) Janice Tjen	6	7^{7}

==== Eleventh qualifier ====
First round
11	(Hungary) Dalma Gálfi	6	4	6
(Czech Republic) Linda Fruhvirtová	2	6	4
PR	(Australia) Storm Hunter	6^{5}	6^{0}
21	(Poland) Katarzyna Kawa	7^{7}	7^{7}

Qualifying competition
11	(Hungary) Dalma Gálfi	7	6
21	(Poland) Katarzyna Kawa	5	2

==== Twelfth qualifier ====
First round
12	(Slovenia) Veronika Erjavec	3	3
(Australia) Maddison Inglis	6	6
(Kazakhstan) Zarina Diyas	4	4
20	(Switzerland) Rebeka Masarova	6	6

Qualifying competition
(Australia) Maddison Inglis	4	7^{7}	7
20	(Switzerland) Rebeka Masarova	6	6^{5}	5
