= 2024 Rancho Santa Fe Open – Singles =

Singles
- 2024 Rancho Santa Fe Open

Final
- Champion: (United States) Iva Jovic
- Runner-up: (Japan) Ena Shibahara
- Score: 6–3, 6–3

Events
Singles	Doubles
← 2023 ·	Rancho Santa Fe Open	· 2025 →

Yulia Starodubtseva was the defending champion but chose not to participate.

Iva Jovic won the title, defeating Ena Shibahara in the final; 6–3, 6–3.

== Seeds ==
1. (Australia) Maya Joint (quarterfinals)
2. (Canada) Rebecca Marino (quarterfinals)
3. (Japan) Ena Shibahara (final)
4. (United States) Kayla Day (withdrew)
5. (Thailand) Lanlana Tararudee (semifinals)
6. (United States) Elizabeth Mandlik (first round)
7. (Czech Republic) Gabriela Knutson (quarterfinals)
8. (United States) Hanna Chang (second round)

== Draw ==
=== Key ===
- Q = Qualifier
- WC = Wild card
- LL = Lucky loser
- Alt = Alternate
- SE = Special exempt
- PR = Protected ranking
- ITF = ITF entry
- JE = Junior exempt
- w/o = Walkover
- r = Retired
- d = Defaulted
- SR = Special ranking

=== Finals ===
Semifinals
(Canada) Katherine Sebov	1	3
3	(Japan) Ena Shibahara	6	6
(United States) Iva Jovic	6	7
5	(Thailand) Lanlana Tararudee	1	5

Final
3	(Japan) Ena Shibahara	3	3
(United States) Iva Jovic	6	6

=== Top half ===
First round
1	(Australia) M Joint	6	6
LL	(United States) T Kinard	4	2
Q	(United States) R McAdoo	4	5
(United States) A Urhobo	6	7
WC	(Ukraine) A Lopata	3	3
(Canada) K Sebov	6	6
WC	(United States) J Pareja	2	6	6
6	(United States) E Mandlik	6	4	1
3	(Japan) E Shibahara	6	6
Q	(United States) S Colling	2	0
(Serbia) D Radanović	4	3
WC	(United States) A Penickova	6	6
Q	(United States) L Davis	6	6
(United States) L Chirico	3	0
I Shymanovich	1	6	3
8	(United States) H Chang	6	3	6

Second round
1	(Australia) M Joint	6	6
(United States) A Urhobo	4	4
(Canada) K Sebov	6^{4}	6	6
WC	(United States) J Pareja	7^{7}	1	3
3	(Japan) E Shibahara	6	6
WC	(United States) A Penickova	1	0
Q	(United States) L Davis	6	6
8	(United States) H Chang	2	2

Quarterfinals
1	(Australia) M Joint	4	4
(Canada) K Sebov	6	6
3	(Japan) E Shibahara	7^{8}	6
Q	(United States) L Davis	6^{6}	3

Semifinals
(Canada) K Sebov	1	3
3	(Japan) E Shibahara	6	6

=== Bottom half ===
First round
7	(Czech Republic) G Knutson	3	6	6
Q	(United States) H Giavara	6	3	2
(United States) K Scott	6	4	3
Q	(United States) C Campana	4	6	6
(United States) I Jovic	4	6	6
(United States) V Hu	6	4	1
(United States) M Sieg	6	5	6
Q	(China) L Mi	3	7	2
5	(Thailand) L Tararudee	6	6
Q	(United States) G Price	3	2
WC	(United States) A Kratzer	6	4	7
(Canada) C Branstine	4	6	5
(United States) E Kalieva	1	7	7^{7}
(Poland) K Kawa	6	5	6^{5}
Q	(United States) K Evans	3	4
2	(Canada) R Marino	6	6

Second round
7	(Czech Republic) G Knutson	6	6
Q	(United States) C Campana	3	0
(United States) I Jovic	6	6
(United States) M Sieg	2	3
5	(Thailand) L Tararudee	6	5	6
WC	(United States) A Kratzer	3	7	0
(United States) E Kalieva	6^{3}	4
2	(Canada) R Marino	7^{7}	6

Quarterfinals
7	(Czech Republic) G Knutson	1	2
(United States) I Jovic	6	6
5	(Thailand) L Tararudee	6	6
2	(Canada) R Marino	4	2

Semifinals
(United States) I Jovic	6	7
5	(Thailand) L Tararudee	1	5
