= 2023 Open ITF Arcadis Brezo Osuna – Doubles =

Doubles
- 2023 Open ITF Arcadis Brezo Osuna

Final
- Champions: (United States) Makenna Jones (United States) Jamie Loeb
- Runners-up: (Australia) Destanee Aiava (Turkey) Berfu Cengiz
- Score: 6–4, 5–7, [10–6]

Events
Singles	Doubles
- Open ITF Arcadis Brezo Osuna

Anna Danilina and Anastasia Tikhonova were the defending champions but chose not to participate.

Makenna Jones and Jamie Loeb won the title, defeating Destanee Aiava and Berfu Cengiz in the final, 6–4, 5–7, [10–6].

== Seeds ==
1. (United States) Makenna Jones / (United States) Jamie Loeb (champions)
2. (Netherlands) Arianne Hartono / (Lithuania) Justina Mikulskytė (semifinals, retired)
3. (Australia) Alana Parnaby / Ekaterina Yashina (first round)
4. (Croatia) Mariana Dražić / (United Kingdom) Emily Webley-Smith (first round, retired)

== Draw ==
Key

- Q = Qualifier
- WC = Wild card
- LL = Lucky loser
- Alt = Alternate
- ITF = ITF entry
- PR = Protected ranking
- SR = Special ranking
- SE = Special exempt
- JE = Junior exempt
- JR = Junior Accelerator Programme entrant
- CO = College Accelerator Programme entrant
- NG = Next Gen Accelerator Program entrant
- w/o = Walkover
- r = Retired
- d = Defaulted

First round
1	(United States) M Jones (United States) J Loeb	6	6
(Denmark) O Helmi (Slovakia) V Morvayová	4	4
WC	(Spain) MdlP Alberto (Spain) C Gay	2	1
T Prozorova (India) V Shinde	6	6
3	(Australia) A Parnaby; E Yashina	6^{4}	6^{2}
WC	(Spain) Y Cavallé Reimers (Serbia) E Milovanović	7^{7}	7^{7}
(Bulgaria) L Karatancheva (France) Y Mansouri	6	4	[9]
(Indonesia) B Gumulya (United States) D Hewitt	2	6	[11]
WC	(Spain) B Berges (Spain) L Cuesta Bret	2	0
(United States) J Failla (Slovakia) K Strešnáková	6	6
(Australia) D Aiava (Turkey) B Cengiz	6	5
4	(Croatia) M Dražić (United Kingdom) E Webley-Smith	2	0^{r}
(Colombia) M Herazo González; E Kazionova	6	6
(Romania) KP Bejenaru (Greece) M Matoula	2	4
(Australia) J Fourlis (Bosnia and Herzegovina) D Herdželaš	6^{4}	4
2	(Netherlands) A Hartono (Lithuania) J Mikulskytė	7^{7}	6

Quarterfinals
1	(United States) M Jones (United States) J Loeb	6	6
T Prozorova (India) V Shinde	2	0
WC	(Spain) Y Cavallé Reimers (Serbia) E Milovanović	7	6
(Indonesia) B Gumulya (United States) D Hewitt	5	4
(United States) J Failla (Slovakia) K Strešnáková	2	7^{7}	[5]
(Australia) D Aiava (Turkey) B Cengiz	6	6^{4}	[10]
(Colombia) M Herazo González; E Kazionova	4	6^{1}
2	(Netherlands) A Hartono (Lithuania) J Mikulskytė	6	7^{7}

Semifinals
1	(United States) M Jones (United States) J Loeb	7	6
WC	(Spain) Y Cavallé Reimers (Serbia) E Milovanović	5	3
(Australia) D Aiava (Turkey) B Cengiz	7	1
2	(Netherlands) A Hartono (Lithuania) J Mikulskytė	5	0^{r}

Final
1	(United States) M Jones (United States) J Loeb	6	5	[10]
(Australia) D Aiava (Turkey) B Cengiz	4	7	[6]
