= 2021 Rancho Santa Fe Open – Singles =

Singles
- 2021 Rancho Santa Fe Open

Final
- Champion: (Sweden) Rebecca Peterson
- Runner-up: (United States) Elvina Kalieva
- Score: 6–4, 6–0

Events
Singles	Doubles
← 2020 ·	Rancho Santa Fe Open	· 2022 →

You Xiaodi was the defending champion but chose not to participate.

Rebecca Peterson won the title, defeating Elvina Kalieva in the final, 6–4, 6–0.

== Seeds ==
1. (Sweden) Rebecca Peterson (champion)
2. (France) Fiona Ferro (semifinals, retired)
3. (United States) Madison Brengle (semifinals)
4. (Kazakhstan) Zarina Diyas (second round)
5. (Japan) Misaki Doi (first round)
6. (Slovakia) Kristína Kučová (quarterfinals)
7. (Mexico) Renata Zarazúa (first round)
8. (Slovenia) Polona Hercog (quarterfinals)

== Draw ==
=== Key ===
- Q = Qualifier
- WC = Wild card
- LL = Lucky loser
- Alt = Alternate
- SE = Special exempt
- PR = Protected ranking
- ITF = ITF entry
- JE = Junior exempt
- w/o = Walkover
- r = Retired
- d = Defaulted
- SR = Special ranking

=== Finals ===
Semifinals
1	(Sweden) Rebecca Peterson	6	6
3	(United States) Madison Brengle	4	2
Q	(United States) Elvina Kalieva	4	6	3
2	(France) Fiona Ferro	6	4	0^{r}

Final
1	(Sweden) Rebecca Peterson	6	6
Q	(United States) Elvina Kalieva	4	0

=== Top half ===
First round
1	(Sweden) R Peterson	6	6
WC	(United States) H Chang	1	0
(Japan) M Hibi	6	6
Q	(France) M Partaud	3	3
Q	(United States) A Krueger	2	2
SE	(United States) E Bektas	6	6
(Australia) L Cabrera	6	6
7	(Mexico) R Zarazúa	2	2
3	(United States) M Brengle	6	6
WC	(United States) A Kiick	0	2
(Canada) R Marino	6	6
(Australia) M Inglis	4	3
(Ukraine) K Kozlova	7	6
Q	(Slovakia) T Mihalíková	5	2
WC	(United States) K Day	3	6	6
5	(Japan) M Doi	6	4	3

Second round
1	(Sweden) R Peterson	6	6
(Japan) M Hibi	1	1
SE	(United States) E Bektas	6	1	6^{5}
(Australia) L Cabrera	4	6	7^{7}
3	(United States) M Brengle	6	6
(Canada) R Marino	1	2
(Ukraine) K Kozlova	2	6	6
WC	(United States) K Day	6	3	2

Quarterfinals
1	(Sweden) R Peterson	6	6
(Australia) L Cabrera	4	1
3	(United States) M Brengle	4	6	6
(Ukraine) K Kozlova	6	1	4

Semifinals
1	(Sweden) R Peterson	6	6
3	(United States) M Brengle	4	2

=== Bottom half ===
First round
8	(Slovenia) P Hercog	6^{5}	6	7
WC	(United States) J Failla	7^{7}	3	5
Q	(United States) E Douglas	7^{7}	3	6
Q	(United States) M Manasse	6^{4}	6	2
Q	(United States) D Hewitt	5	6	2
Q	(United States) E Kalieva	7	1	6
(Switzerland) L Küng	0	1
4	(Kazakhstan) Z Diyas	6	6
6	(Slovakia) K Kučová	4	6	6
JE	(France) E Jacquemot	6	4	2
Q	(United States) H Giavara	5	0
PR	(Australia) P Hon	7	6
(Poland) K Kawa	1	4
(Australia) Ar Rodionova	6	6
(United States) C Dolehide	2	7	2
2	(France) F Ferro	6	5	6

Second round
8	(Slovenia) P Hercog	6	6
Q	(United States) E Douglas	4	2
Q	(United States) E Kalieva	6	2	6
4	(Kazakhstan) Z Diyas	4	6	2
6	(Slovakia) K Kučová	1	7^{7}	7^{7}
PR	(Australia) P Hon	6	6^{4}	6^{4}
(Australia) Ar Rodionova	2	2
2	(France) F Ferro	6	6

Quarterfinals
8	(Slovenia) P Hercog	4	3
Q	(United States) E Kalieva	6	6
6	(Slovakia) K Kučová	6^{6}	6	4
2	(France) F Ferro	7^{8}	3	6

Semifinals
Q	(United States) E Kalieva	4	6	3
2	(France) F Ferro	6	4	0^{r}
