= 2022 Rancho Santa Fe Open =

Tennis tournament

- Date: 3–9 October 2022
- Edition: 12th
- Category: ITF Women's World Tennis Tour
- Prize money: $80,000
- Surface: Hard / Outdoor
- Location: Rancho Santa Fe, California, United States

Champions

Singles
- (Mexico) Marcela Zacarías

Doubles
- (United States) Elvina Kalieva / (Poland) Katarzyna Kawa
← 2021 ·	Rancho Santa Fe Open	· 2023 →

The 2022 Rancho Santa Fe Open was a professional tennis tournament played on outdoor hard courts. It was the twelfth edition of the tournament which was part of the 2022 ITF Women's World Tennis Tour. It took place in Rancho Santa Fe, California, United States between 3 and 9 October 2022.

== Champions ==
=== Singles ===
- (Mexico) Marcela Zacarías def. (United States) Katrina Scott, 6–1, 6–2

=== Doubles ===
- (United States) Elvina Kalieva / (Poland) Katarzyna Kawa def. (Mexico) Giuliana Olmos / (Mexico) Marcela Zacarías, 6–1, 3–6, [10–2]

== Singles main draw entrants ==
=== Seeds ===
Country	Player	Rank^{1}	Seed
~~SWE~~	~~Rebecca Peterson~~	~~101~~	~~1~~
CHN	Yuan Yue	104	2
USA	Katie Volynets	116	3
JPN	Nao Hibino	146	4
USA	Caroline Dolehide	160	5
POL	Katarzyna Kawa	163	6
CAN	Carol Zhao	171	7
NED	Arianne Hartono	180	8

- ^{1} Rankings are as of 26 September 2022.

=== Other entrants ===
The following players received wildcards into the singles main draw:

- (United States) Dalayna Hewitt
- (United States) Elvina Kalieva
- (Indonesia) Janice Tjen

The following player received a special exempt into the singles main draw:

- (United States) Robin Montgomery

The following players received entry from the qualifying draw:

- (Philippines) Alex Eala
- (Chinese Taipei) Hsu Chieh-yu
- (United States) Hina Inoue
- (Australia) Ellen Perez
- (Poland) Urszula Radwańska
- (United States) Anna Rogers
- (Australia) Storm Sanders
- (Japan) Ena Shibahara

The following player received entry as a lucky loser:

- (United States) Adriana Reami
