= 2023 Open ITF Arcadis Brezo Osuna – Singles =

Singles
- 2023 Open ITF Arcadis Brezo Osuna

Final
- Champion: Tatiana Prozorova
- Runner-up: (Spain) Marta Soriano Santiago
- Score: 6–3, 6–1

Events
Singles	Doubles
← 2022 ·	Open ITF Arcadis Brezo Osuna	· 2024 →

Marina Bassols Ribera was the defending champion but chose not to participate.

Tatiana Prozorova won the title, defeating Marta Soriano Santiago in the final, 6–3, 6–1.

== Seeds ==
All seeds receive a bye into the second round.

1. (Australia) Jaimee Fourlis (second round)
2. (United States) Robin Montgomery (quarterfinals)
3. (China) Bai Zhuoxuan (semifinals)
4. (Netherlands) Arianne Hartono (second round)
5. (France) Harmony Tan (second round)
6. (United States) Jamie Loeb (second round)
7. (Japan) Sakura Hosogi (quarterfinals)
8. (Turkey) Berfu Cengiz (quarterfinals)
9. Tatiana Prozorova (champion)
10. (Ukraine) Kateryna Volodko (third round, retired)
11. (Hong Kong) Adithya Karunaratne (third round)
12. (Australia) Destanee Aiava (third round)
13. (Bosnia and Herzegovina) Nefisa Berberović (third round)
14. (Finland) Anastasia Kulikova (third round)
15. Jana Kolodynska (third round)
16. (Lithuania) Justina Mikulskytė (second round)

== Draw ==
=== Key ===
- Q = Qualifier
- WC = Wild card
- LL = Lucky loser
- Alt = Alternate
- ITF = ITF entry
- PR = Protected ranking
- SR = Special ranking
- SE = Special exempt
- JE = Junior exempt
- JR = Junior Accelerator Programme entrant
- CO = College Accelerator Programme entrant
- NG = Next Gen Accelerator Program entrant
- w/o = Walkover
- r = Retired
- d = Defaulted

=== Finals ===
Quarterfinals
(Bosnia and Herzegovina) Dea Herdželaš	3	5
WC	(Spain) Marta Soriano Santiago	6	7
(United States) Jessica Failla	6	4	6
7	(Japan) Sakura Hosogi	4	6	4
8	(Turkey) Berfu Cengiz	6^{3}	4
3	(China) Bai Zhuoxuan	7^{7}	6
9	Tatiana Prozorova	6^{4}	7	6
2	(United States) Robin Montgomery	7^{7}	5	4

Semifinals
WC	(Spain) Marta Soriano Santiago	3	6	7
(United States) Jessica Failla	6	1	5
3	(China) Bai Zhuoxuan	3	5
9	Tatiana Prozorova	6	7

Final
WC	(Spain) Marta Soriano Santiago	3	1
9	Tatiana Prozorova	6	6

=== Top half ===
==== Section 1 ====
First round
(Bosnia and Herzegovina) D Herdželaš	7^{7}	7
(United States) M Jones	6^{4}	5
Q	(France) F Brugnone	2	3
(Denmark) O Helmi	6	6
WC	(Spain) C Gómez	6	6
WC	(Spain) M Benito	0	0
(Slovakia) V Morvayová	4	6	2
WC	(Spain) M Soriano Santiago	6	2	6

Second round
1	(Australia) J Fourlis	6	4	4
(Bosnia and Herzegovina) D Herdželaš	3	6	6
(Denmark) O Helmi	5	3
13	(Bosnia and Herzegovina) N Berberović	7	6
12	(Australia) D Aiava	6	2	7
WC	(Spain) C Gómez	1	6	5
WC	(Spain) M Soriano Santiago	6	4	6
5	(France) H Tan	3	6	2

Third round
(Bosnia and Herzegovina) D Herdželaš	7	7^{10}
13	(Bosnia and Herzegovina) N Berberović	5	6^{8}
12	(Australia) D Aiava	2	5
WC	(Spain) M Soriano Santiago	6	7

Quarterfinals
(Bosnia and Herzegovina) D Herdželaš	3	5
WC	(Spain) M Soriano Santiago	6	7

==== Section 2 ====
First round
(United States) J Failla	6	6
(France) Y Mansouri	2	1
Q	K Pavlova	6	6
E Yashina	2	1
WC	(Spain) L Moreno Arias	1	5
Q	(Romania) KP Bejenaru	6	7
LL	(Argentina) L Peyre	7	6
Q	(China) T Mi	5	1

Second round
4	(Netherlands) A Hartono	6^{0}	5
(United States) J Failla	7^{7}	7
Q	K Pavlova	6	3	6
16	(Lithuania) J Mikulskytė	4	6	4
10	(Ukraine) K Volodko	6	6
Q	(Romania) KP Bejenaru	4	3
LL	(Argentina) L Peyre	2	7^{7}	3
7	(Japan) S Hosogi	6	6^{3}	6

Third round
(United States) J Failla	6	6
Q	K Pavlova	3	0
10	(Ukraine) K Volodko	3^{r}
7	(Japan) S Hosogi	2

Quarterfinals
(United States) J Failla	6	4	6
7	(Japan) S Hosogi	4	6	4

=== Bottom half ===
==== Section 3 ====
First round
(Turkey) İ Yörük	3	6	7
(Japan) N Hanatani	6	0	5
Q	(Slovakia) K Strešnáková	6	6
(Switzerland) N Keller	4	1
Q	(Switzerland) S Scilipoti	7	7
(Belgium) C Vlasselaer	5	5
(Greece) M Matoula	6	7^{7}
(Spain) Y Cavallé Reimers	3	6^{5}

Second round
8	(Turkey) B Cengiz	6	6
(Turkey) İ Yörük	4	3
Q	(Slovakia) K Strešnáková	2	6^{7}
11	(Hong Kong) A Karunaratne	6	7^{9}
14	(Finland) A Kulikova	6^{3}	6	7
Q	(Switzerland) S Scilipoti	7^{7}	3	5
(Greece) M Matoula	1	2
3	(China) Z Bai	6	6

Third round
8	(Turkey) B Cengiz	2	7	6
11	(Hong Kong) A Karunaratne	6	5	2
14	(Finland) A Kulikova	2	4
3	(China) Z Bai	6	6

Quarterfinals
8	(Turkey) B Cengiz	6^{3}	4
3	(China) Z Bai	7^{7}	6

==== Section 4 ====
First round
M Bondarenko	6	6
E Kazionova	0	2
Q	(France) J Belgraver	4	4
(United States) D Hewitt	6	6
(Colombia) M Herazo González	3	3
Q	(Sweden) J Cabaj Awad	6	6
(Australia) A Parnaby	6	1	5
WC	(Spain) N Bouzó Zanotti	3	6	7

Second round
6	(United States) J Loeb	2	3
M Bondarenko	6	6
(United States) D Hewitt	6^{1}	3
9	T Prozorova	7^{7}	6
15	J Kolodynska	w/o
Q	(Sweden) J Cabaj Awad
WC	(Spain) N Bouzó Zanotti	4	3
2	(United States) R Montgomery	6	6

Third round
M Bondarenko	3	3
9	T Prozorova	6	6
15	J Kolodynska	2	4
2	(United States) R Montgomery	6	6

Quarterfinals
9	T Prozorova	6^{4}	7	6
2	(United States) R Montgomery	7^{7}	5	4
