= 2023 Rancho Santa Fe Open – Singles =

Singles
- 2023 Rancho Santa Fe Open

Final
- Champion: (Ukraine) Yulia Starodubtseva
- Runner-up: (Switzerland) Lulu Sun
- Score: 7–5, 6–3

Events
| Singles | Doubles |
| ← 2022 · | Rancho Santa Fe Open | · 2024 → |

Marcela Zacarías was the defending champion but chose not to participate.

Yulia Starodubtseva won the title, defeating Lulu Sun in the final, 7–5, 6–3.

== Seeds ==
1. (Argentina) Julia Riera (second round)
2. (United States) Elvina Kalieva (second round)
3. Tatiana Prozorova (first round)
4. (Ukraine) Yulia Starodubtseva (champion)
5. (United States) Louisa Chirico (quarterfinals)
6. (Canada) Stacey Fung (second round)
7. Anastasia Tikhonova (semifinals)
8. (Switzerland) Lulu Sun (final)

== Draw ==
=== Key ===
- Q = Qualifier
- WC = Wild card
- LL = Lucky loser
- Alt = Alternate
- SE = Special exempt
- PR = Protected ranking
- ITF = ITF entry
- JE = Junior exempt
- w/o = Walkover
- r = Retired
- d = Defaulted
- SR = Special ranking

=== Finals ===
Semifinals
7 | Anastasia Tikhonova | 3 | 2
8 | (Switzerland) Lulu Sun | 6 | 6
4 | (Ukraine) Yulia Starodubtseva | 6 | 6
Q | (China) Han Jiangxue | 3 | 4

Final
8 | (Switzerland) Lulu Sun | 5 | 3
4 | (Ukraine) Yulia Starodubtseva | 7 | 6

=== Top half ===
First round
1 | (Argentina) J Riera | 6 | 6^{5} | 6
LL | (United States) T Kinard | 1 | 7^{7} | 2
(Colombia) M Herazo González | 3 | 0^{r}
SE | (Japan) S Ishii | 6 | 4
(United States) H Giavara | 6 | 6
Q | (United States) K Hance | 4 | 4
WC | (United States) K McKenzie | 6 | 4 | 2
7 | A Tikhonova | 4 | 6 | 6
3 | T Prozorova | 3 | 3
Q | M Kozyreva | 6 | 6
(United States) H Chang | 6 | 6
LL | (United States) A Ahn | 1 | 2
WC | (United States) E Douglas | 7^{7} | 7^{7}
Q | (Vietnam) S Lý-Nguyễn | 6^{2} | 6^{3}
(United States) K Scott | 3 | 3
8 | (Switzerland) L Sun | 6 | 6

Second round
1 | (Argentina) J Riera | 3 | 4
SE | (Japan) S Ishii | 6 | 6
(United States) H Giavara | 4 | 3
7 | A Tikhonova | 6 | 6
Q | M Kozyreva | 7^{9} | 6
(United States) H Chang | 6^{7} | 4
WC | (United States) E Douglas | 3 | 6^{6}
8 | (Switzerland) L Sun | 6 | 7^{8}

Quarterfinals
SE | (Japan) S Ishii | 2 | 2
7 | A Tikhonova | 6 | 6
Q | M Kozyreva | 6^{0} | 2
8 | (Switzerland) L Sun | 7^{7} | 6

Semifinals
7 | A Tikhonova | 3 | 2
8 | (Switzerland) L Sun | 6 | 6

=== Bottom half ===
First round
5 | (United States) L Chirico | 6 | 6
Q | (United States) P Corley | 0 | 3
(United States) M Jones | 7 | 6
JE | (China) F Tian | 5 | 4
(United States) J DeFalco | 5 | 3
(United States) J Aney | 7 | 6
(Denmark) J Svendsen | 2 | 4
4 | (Ukraine) Y Starodubtseva | 6 | 6
6 | (Canada) S Fung | 6 | 6
WC | (United States) M Sieg | 3 | 4
Q | (United States) E Cayetano | 6 | 6
Q | (Germany) N Rivkin | 2 | 3
(India) S Yamalapalli | 3 | 5
Q | (China) J Han | 6 | 7
Q | (United States) M McCray | 4 | 0
2 | (United States) E Kalieva | 6 | 6

Second round
5 | (United States) L Chirico | 6 | 7
(United States) M Jones | 3 | 5
(United States) J Aney | 1 | 2
4 | (Ukraine) Y Starodubtseva | 6 | 6
6 | (Canada) S Fung | 4 | 1
Q | (United States) E Cayetano | 6 | 6
Q | (China) J Han | 4 | 6 | 7^{8}
2 | (United States) E Kalieva | 6 | 1 | 6^{6}

Quarterfinals
5 | (United States) L Chirico | 6 | 3 | 4
4 | (Ukraine) Y Starodubtseva | 4 | 6 | 6
Q | (United States) E Cayetano | 5 | 3
Q | (China) J Han | 7 | 6

Semifinals
4 | (Ukraine) Y Starodubtseva | 6 | 6
Q | (China) J Han | 3 | 4
