= 2025 China Open (tennis) =

- Date: 24 September – 5 October (WTA); 26 September – 2 October (ATP)
- Edition: 24th (ATP) / 26th (WTA)
- Category: WTA 1000 (women); ATP 500 (men)
- Surface: Hard
- Location: Beijing, China
- Venue: National Tennis Center

Champions

Men's singles
- (Italy) Jannik Sinner

Women's singles
- (United States) Amanda Anisimova

Men's doubles
- (Finland) Harri Heliövaara / (United Kingdom) Henry Patten

Women's doubles
- (Italy) Sara Errani / (Italy) Jasmine Paolini
- China Open (tennis)

The 2025 China Open was a professional tennis tournament played on outdoor hardcourts. It was the 24th edition of the China Open for men and the 26th for women. The tournament was categorized as a WTA 1000 event on the 2025 WTA Tour and an ATP 500 event on the 2025 ATP Tour. Both the women's and the men's tournaments were held at the National Tennis Center in Beijing, from 24 September to 5 October and from 26 September to 2 October respectively.

== Point distribution ==
Event	W	F	SF	QF	Round of 16	Round of 32	Round of 64	Round of 128	Q	Q2	Q1
Men's singles	500	330	200	100	50	0	—N/a	—N/a	25	13	0
Men's doubles	500	300	180	90	0	—N/a	—N/a	—N/a	45	25	0
Women's singles	1,000	650	390	215	120	65	35	10	30	20	2
Women's doubles	1,000	650	390	215	120	10	—N/a	—N/a	—N/a	—N/a	—N/a

=== Prize money ===
Event	W	F	SF	QF	Round of 16	Round of 32	Round of 64	Round of 128	Q2	Q1
Men's singles	$751,075	$404,105	$215,360	$110,030	$58,735	$31,320	—N/a	—N/a	$16,055	$9,005
Men's doubles	$228,510	$121,870	$61,660	$30,830	$15,960	—N/a	—N/a	—N/a	$0	$0
Women's singles	$1,124,380	$597,890	$332,160	$189,075	$103,225	$60,400	$35,260	$23,760	$13,795	$7,155
Women's doubles	$457,150	$242,020	$129,970	$65,000	$34,850	$19,050	—N/a	—N/a	—N/a	—N/a

== Champions ==
=== Men's singles ===
- (Italy) Jannik Sinner def. (United States) Learner Tien, 6–2, 6–2

=== Women's singles ===
- (United States) Amanda Anisimova def. (Czech Republic) Linda Nosková, 6–0, 2–6, 6–2

=== Men's doubles ===
(Finland) Harri Heliövaara / (United Kingdom) Henry Patten def. Karen Khachanov / Andrey Rublev 4–6, 6–3, [10–8]

=== Women's doubles ===
- (Italy) Sara Errani / (Italy) Jasmine Paolini def. (Japan) Miyu Kato / (Hungary) Fanny Stollár, 6–7^{(1–7)}, 6–3, [10–2]

== ATP singles main-draw entrants ==
=== Seeds ===
Country	Player	Rank^{1}	Seed
ITA	Jannik Sinner	2	1
GER	Alexander Zverev	3	2
AUS	Alex de Minaur	8	3
ITA	Lorenzo Musetti	9	4
	Karen Khachanov	10	5
	Andrey Rublev	14	6
CZE	Jakub Menšík	17	7
	Daniil Medvedev	18	8

- ^{1} Rankings are as of 15 September 2025

=== Other entrants ===
The following players received wildcards into the singles main draw:

- (China) Bu Yunchaokete
- (China) Shang Juncheng
- (China) Zhang Zhizhen

The following players received entry from the qualifying draw:

- (France) Adrian Mannarino
- (France) Arthur Cazaux
- (France) Térence Atmane
- (Belgium) David Goffin

The following player received entry as a lucky loser:

- (France) Arthur Rinderknech

=== Withdrawals ===
- (Spain) Roberto Bautista Agut → replaced by (France) Benjamin Bonzi
- (Argentina) Tomás Martín Etcheverry → replaced by (France) Arthur Rinderknech
- (France) Gaël Monfils → replaced by (Hungary) Fábián Marozsán
- (Greece) Stefanos Tsitsipas → replaced by (United States) Learner Tien

== ATP doubles main-draw entrants ==
=== Seeds ===
Country	Player	Country	Player	Rank^{1}	Seed
GBR	Julian Cash	GBR	Lloyd Glasspool	3	1
ESA	Marcelo Arévalo	CRO	Mate Pavić	6	2
FIN	Harri Heliövaara	GBR	Henry Patten	14	3
ITA	Simone Bolelli	ITA	Andrea Vavassori	29	4

- Rankings are as of 15 September 2025

=== Other entrants ===
The following pairs received wildcards into the doubles main draw:

- (China) Bu Yunchaokete / (United Kingdom) Cameron Norrie
- (China) Shang Juncheng / (China) Zhang Zhizhen

The following pair received entry from the qualifying draw:

- (Argentina) Guido Andreozzi / (France) Manuel Guinard

The following pair received entry as lucky losers:

- (Monaco) Romain Arneodo / (Belgium) Sander Gillé

=== Withdrawals ===
- (Kazakhstan) Alexander Bublik / (Italy) Lorenzo Musetti → replaced by (Monaco) Romain Arneodo / (Belgium) Sander Gillé
