= 2022 Open ITF Arcadis Brezo Osuna =

Tennis tournament

- Date: 13–19 June 2022
- Edition: 8th
- Category: ITF Women's World Tennis Tour
- Prize money: $60,000
- Surface: Hard / Outdoor
- Location: Madrid, Spain

Champions

Singles
- (Spain) Marina Bassols Ribera

Doubles
- (Kazakhstan) Anna Danilina / Anastasia Tikhonova
- Open ITF Arcadis Brezo Osuna

The 2022 Open ITF Arcadis Brezo Osuna was a professional tennis tournament played on outdoor hard courts. It was the eighth edition of the tournament which was part of the 2022 ITF Women's World Tennis Tour. It took place in Madrid, Spain between 13 and 19 June 2022.

== Champions ==
=== Singles ===
- (Spain) Marina Bassols Ribera def. (Philippines) Alex Eala, 6–4, 7–5

=== Doubles ===
- (Kazakhstan) Anna Danilina / Anastasia Tikhonova def. (China) Lu Jiajing / (China) You Xiaodi, 6–4, 6–2

== Singles main draw entrants ==
=== Seeds ===
Country	Player	Rank^{1}	Seed
CHN	Zhu Lin	96	1
	Anastasia Tikhonova	175	2
AUS	Jaimee Fourlis	177	3
NED	Richèl Hogenkamp	222	4
FRA	Carole Monnet	258	5
HUN	Tímea Babos	262	6
ESP	Yvonne Cavallé Reimers	277	7
	Valeria Savinykh	282	8
GER	Stephanie Wagner	294	9
CHN	You Xiaodi	296	10
CHI	Daniela Seguel	297	11
ESP	Jéssica Bouzas Maneiro	305	12
CHN	Lu Jiajing	310	13
ESP	Marina Bassols Ribera	317	14
TPE	Liang En-shuo	322	15
CAN	Katherine Sebov	325	16

- ^{1} Rankings are as of 6 June 2022.

=== Other entrants ===
The following players received wildcards into the singles main draw:

- (Spain) Ainhoa Atucha Gómez
- (Spain) Lucía Cortez Llorca
- (Spain) Carolina Gómez
- (Spain) Ariana Geerlings
- (Spain) Lidia Moreno Arias

The following player received entry into the singles main draw using a protected ranking:

- (Australia) Ivana Popovic

The following players received entry from the qualifying draw:

- (Japan) Mana Ayukawa
- (Spain) Marta González Encinas
- (Germany) Kathleen Kanev
- (Bulgaria) Lia Karatancheva
- (France) Yasmine Mansouri
- (Slovakia) Sofia Milatová
- (Australia) Alana Parnaby
- (France) Marine Szostak
