= 2022 Open ITF Arcadis Brezo Osuna – Doubles =

Doubles
- 2022 Open ITF Arcadis Brezo Osuna

Final
- Champions: (Kazakhstan) Anna Danilina; Anastasia Tikhonova
- Runners-up: (China) Lu Jiajing (China) You Xiaodi
- Score: 6–4, 6–2

Events
Singles	Doubles
- Open ITF Arcadis Brezo Osuna

Destanee Aiava and Olivia Gadecki were the defending champions but chose not to participate.

Anna Danilina and Anastasia Tikhonova won the title, defeating Lu Jiajing and You Xiaodi in the final, 6–4, 6–2.

== Seeds ==
1. (Kazakhstan) Anna Danilina / Anastasia Tikhonova (champions)
2. (Netherlands) Isabelle Haverlag / Ekaterina Yashina (first round)
3. Angelina Gabueva / Anastasia Zakharova (semifinals)
4. (Hungary) Tímea Babos / Valeria Savinykh (semifinals)

== Draw ==
Key

- Q = Qualifier
- WC = Wild card
- LL = Lucky loser
- Alt = Alternate
- ITF = ITF entry
- PR = Protected ranking
- SR = Special ranking
- SE = Special exempt
- JE = Junior exempt
- JR = Junior Accelerator Programme entrant
- CO = College Accelerator Programme entrant
- NG = Next Gen Accelerator Program entrant
- w/o = Walkover
- r = Retired
- d = Defaulted

=== Draw ===
First round
1	(Kazakhstan) A Danilina; A Tikhonova	6	6
WC	(Spain) A Atucha Gómez (Spain) C Gallardo Guevara	2	3
(Bulgaria) A Karatancheva (Bulgaria) L Karatancheva	6	6
(Sweden) J Cabaj Awad (France) C Monnet	4	2
4	(Hungary) T Babos; V Savinykh	6	2	[10]
(Japan) M Ayukawa (Australia) A Parnaby	3	6	[5]
(Philippines) A Eala (Chinese Taipei) E-s Liang	6	6
WC	(Spain) M González Encinas (India) V Shinde	2	1
(Colombia) M Herazo González (Colombia) MP Pérez	7^{7}	6
(Spain) Y Cavallé Reimers (Spain) C Cerviño Ruiz	6^{5}	2
(Spain) M Bassols Ribera (Chile) D Seguel	4	3
3	A Gabueva; A Zakharova	6	6
WC	(Spain) M Benito (Spain) A Montes Khaghani	7	6^{6}	[10]
(Germany) K Kanev (Slovakia) S Milatová	5	7^{8}	[8]
(China) Jia Lu (China) X You	6	6
2	(Netherlands) I Haverlag; E Yashina	2	3

Quarterfinals
1	(Kazakhstan) A Danilina; A Tikhonova	6	6
(Bulgaria) A Karatancheva (Bulgaria) L Karatancheva	3	1
4	(Hungary) T Babos; V Savinykh	6	6
(Philippines) A Eala (Chinese Taipei) E-s Liang	2	4
(Colombia) M Herazo González (Colombia) MP Pérez	4	3
3	A Gabueva; A Zakharova	6	6
WC	(Spain) M Benito (Spain) A Montes Khaghani	2	0
(China) Jia Lu (China) X You	6	6

Semifinals
1	(Kazakhstan) A Danilina; A Tikhonova	6	3	[10]
4	(Hungary) T Babos; V Savinykh	4	6	[8]
3	A Gabueva; A Zakharova	6^{5}	2
(China) Jia Lu (China) X You	7^{7}	6

Final
1	(Kazakhstan) A Danilina; A Tikhonova	6	6
(China) Jia Lu (China) X You	4	2
