= 2022 Open ITF Arcadis Brezo Osuna – Singles =

Singles
- 2022 Open ITF Arcadis Brezo Osuna

Final
- Champion: (Spain) Marina Bassols Ribera
- Runner-up: (Philippines) Alex Eala
- Score: 6–4, 7–5

Events
Singles	Doubles
← 2021 ·	Open ITF Arcadis Brezo Osuna	· 2023 →

Robin Anderson was the defending champion but chose to participate at the 2022 Ilkley Trophy instead.

Marina Bassols Ribera won the title, defeating Alex Eala in the final, 6–4, 7–5.

== Seeds ==
All seeds receive a bye into the second round.

1. (China) Zhu Lin (second round, withdrew)
2. Anastasia Tikhonova (third round)
3. (Australia) Jaimee Fourlis (quarterfinals)
4. (Netherlands) Richèl Hogenkamp (second round)
5. (France) Carole Monnet (quarterfinals)
6. (Hungary) Tímea Babos (quarterfinals)
7. (Spain) Yvonne Cavallé Reimers (third round)
8. Valeria Savinykh (second round)
9. (Germany) Stephanie Wagner (third round)
10. (China) You Xiaodi (third round)
11. (Chile) Daniela Seguel (second round)
12. (Spain) Jéssica Bouzas Maneiro (third round)
13. (China) Lu Jiajing (second round)
14. (Spain) Marina Bassols Ribera (champion)
15. (Chinese Taipei) Liang En-shuo (quarterfinals)
16. (Canada) Katherine Sebov (semifinals)

== Draw ==
=== Key ===
- Q = Qualifier
- WC = Wild card
- LL = Lucky loser
- Alt = Alternate
- SE = Special exempt
- PR = Protected ranking
- ITF = ITF entry
- JE = Junior exempt
- w/o = Walkover
- r = Retired
- d = Defaulted
- SR = Special ranking

=== Finals ===
Quarterfinals
15	(Chinese Taipei) Liang En-shuo	6	1	0
(Hong Kong) Adithya Karunaratne	3	6	6
14	(Spain) Marina Bassols Ribera	7^{7}	6
6	(Hungary) Tímea Babos	6^{5}	2
(Philippines) Alex Eala	6	6
3	(Australia) Jaimee Fourlis	1	4
5	(France) Carole Monnet	5	6	3
16	(Canada) Katherine Sebov	7	4	6

Semifinals
(Hong Kong) Adithya Karunaratne	1	3
14	(Spain) Marina Bassols Ribera	6	6
(Philippines) Alex Eala	6	6
16	(Canada) Katherine Sebov	2	1

Final
14	(Spain) Marina Bassols Ribera	6	7
(Philippines) Alex Eala	4	5

=== Top half ===
==== Section 1 ====
First round
WC	(Spain) C Gómez	7	4	0
PR	(Australia) I Popovic	5	6	0^{r}
(Spain) M Gutiérrez Carrasco	4	5
(Denmark) O Helmi	6	7
Q	(Slovakia) S Milatová	6	6
(France) S Djoubri	3	0
(Hong Kong) A Karunaratne	7	6
(Colombia) MP Pérez	5	4

Second round
1	(China) L Zhu
WC	(Spain) C Gómez	w/o
(Denmark) O Helmi	6	6^{7}	4
15	(Chinese Taipei) E-s Liang	3	7^{9}	6
10	(China) X You	6	7^{7}
Q	(Slovakia) S Milatová	3	6^{3}
(Hong Kong) A Karunaratne	1	7^{8}	6
8	V Savinykh	6	6^{6}	2

Third round
WC	(Spain) C Gómez	3	6	3
15	(Chinese Taipei) E-s Liang	6	1	6
10	(China) X You	6	2	2
(Hong Kong) A Karunaratne	4	6	6

Quarterfinals
15	(Chinese Taipei) E-s Liang	6	1	0
(Hong Kong) A Karunaratne	3	6	6

==== Section 2 ====
First round
(Italy) V Meliss	4	3
(Spain) G Maristany	6	6
WC	(Spain) L Cortez Llorca	6	6
Q	(Japan) M Ayukawa	3	4
Q	(France) Y Mansouri	6	4	3
Q	(Australia) A Parnaby	2	6	6
Q	(Spain) M González Encinas	6	6
(Australia) Z Hives	2	4

Second round
4	(Netherlands) R Hogenkamp	6^{8}	2
(Spain) G Maristany	7^{10}	6
WC	(Spain) L Cortez Llorca	4	1
14	(Spain) M Bassols Ribera	6	6
9	(Germany) S Wagner	6	6
Q	(Australia) A Parnaby	2	4
Q	(Spain) M González Encinas	4	0
6	(Hungary) T Babos	6	6

Third round
(Spain) G Maristany	6^{4}	4
14	(Spain) M Bassols Ribera	7^{7}	6
9	(Germany) S Wagner	5	5
6	(Hungary) T Babos	7	7

Quarterfinals
14	(Spain) M Bassols Ribera	7^{7}	6
6	(Hungary) T Babos	6^{5}	2

=== Bottom half ===
==== Section 3 ====
First round
WC	(Spain) A Atucha Gómez	6	6
(Switzerland) A Rushiti	4	4
(Philippines) A Eala	6	6
Q	(Bulgaria) L Karatancheva	4	4
WC	(Spain) A Geerlings	3	2
(Colombia) M Herazo González	6	6
Q	(France) M Szostak	7^{8}	1	2
(Spain) R Vicens Mas	6^{6}	6	6

Second round
7	(Spain) Y Cavallé Reimers	6	3	6
WC	(Spain) A Atucha Gómez	2	6	0
(Philippines) A Eala	6	6
11	(Chile) D Seguel	1	2
13	(China) Jia Lu	5	6^{5}
(Colombia) M Herazo González	7	7^{7}
(Spain) R Vicens Mas	4	4
3	(Australia) J Fourlis	6	6

Third round
7	(Spain) Y Cavallé Reimers	6	2	5
(Philippines) A Eala	0	6	7
(Colombia) M Herazo González	1	5
3	(Australia) J Fourlis	6	7

Quarterfinals
(Philippines) A Eala	6	6
3	(Australia) J Fourlis	1	4

==== Section 4 ====
First round
(Spain) C Cerviño Ruiz	0	6	6
(Kazakhstan) A Danilina	6	3	4
(Italy) F Arcidiacono	6	5	6
WC	(Spain) L Moreno Arias	3	7	4
(Sweden) J Cabaj Awad	6	3	0
E Yashina	3	6	6
(United Kingdom) A Carreras	7^{7}	2	1
Q	(Germany) K Kanev	6^{4}	6	6

Second round
5	(France) C Monnet	6	6
(Spain) C Cerviño Ruiz	1	4
(Italy) F Arcidiacono	3	1
12	(Spain) J Bouzas Maneiro	6	6
16	(Canada) K Sebov	6	6
E Yashina	3	2
Q	(Germany) K Kanev	4	1
2	A Tikhonova	6	6

Third round
5	(France) C Monnet	6	6
12	(Spain) J Bouzas Maneiro	2	1
16	(Canada) K Sebov	6	4	7
2	A Tikhonova	3	6	5

Quarterfinals
5	(France) C Monnet	5	6	3
16	(Canada) K Sebov	7	4	6
