= 2025 China Open – Women's doubles =

Women's doubles
- 2025 China Open

Final
- Champions: (Italy) Sara Errani (Italy) Jasmine Paolini
- Runners-up: (Japan) Miyu Kato (Hungary) Fanny Stollár
- Score: 6–7^{(1–7)}, 6–3, [10–2]

Details
- Draw: 32
- Seeds: 8

Events
Singles	men	women
Doubles	men	women
- China Open

Defending champions Sara Errani and Jasmine Paolini defeated Miyu Kato and Fanny Stollár in the final, 6–7^{(1–7)}, 6–3, [10–2] to win the women's doubles title at the 2025 China Open.

== Seeds ==
1. (Canada) Gabriela Dabrowski / (New Zealand) Erin Routliffe (first round)
2. (Italy) Sara Errani / (Italy) Jasmine Paolini (champions)
3. Veronika Kudermetova / (Belgium) Elise Mertens (second round)
4. (Chinese Taipei) Hsieh Su-wei / (Latvia) Jeļena Ostapenko (semifinals)
5. Mirra Andreeva / Diana Shnaider (first round)
6. (United States) Asia Muhammad / (Netherlands) Demi Schuurs (second round)
7. (Hungary) Tímea Babos / (Brazil) Luisa Stefani (quarterfinals)
8. (China) Guo Hanyu / Alexandra Panova (first round)

== Draw ==
Key

- Q = Qualifier
- WC = Wild card
- LL = Lucky loser
- Alt = Alternate
- ITF = ITF entry
- PR = Protected ranking
- SR = Special ranking
- SE = Special exempt
- JE = Junior exempt
- JR = Junior Accelerator Programme entrant
- CO = College Accelerator Programme entrant
- NG = Next Gen Accelerator Program entrant
- w/o = Walkover
- r = Retired
- d = Defaulted

=== Finals ===
Semifinals
WC	(Australia) Priscilla Hon (Czech Republic) Karolína Muchová
(Japan) Miyu Kato (Hungary) Fanny Stollár	w/o
4	(Chinese Taipei) Hsieh Su-wei (Latvia) Jeļena Ostapenko	4	0
2	(Italy) Sara Errani (Italy) Jasmine Paolini	6	6

Final
(Japan) Miyu Kato (Hungary) Fanny Stollár	7^{7}	3	[2]
2	(Italy) Sara Errani (Italy) Jasmine Paolini	6^{1}	6	[10]

=== Top half ===
First round
1	(Canada) G Dabrowski (New Zealand) E Routliffe	3	6	[4]
(United States) N Melichar-Martinez; L Samsonova	6	1	[10]
(Poland) M Linette (Denmark) C Tauson	4	2
(Kazakhstan) A Danilina (Serbia) A Krunić	6	6
(France) K Mladenovic (China) S Zhang	3	4
WC	(Australia) P Hon (Czech Republic) K Muchová	6	6
WC	(China) Y Shao (China) R Zhang	3	1
6	(United States) A Muhammad (Netherlands) D Schuurs	6	6
3	V Kudermetova (Belgium) E Mertens	6	4	[10]
WC	(China) Q Tang (China) Xiy Wang	2	6	[5]
PR	(Australia) S Hunter (United States) D Krawczyk	7	4	[8]
(Japan) M Kato (Hungary) F Stollár	5	6	[10]
(China) Y Xu (China) Z Yang	6	7^{7}
(United States) A Krueger (United States) J Pegula	4	6^{3}
(Romania) S Cîrstea; A Kalinskaya	3	4
7	(Hungary) T Babos (Brazil) L Stefani	6	6

Second round
(United States) N Melichar-Martinez; L Samsonova	5	6	[7]
(Kazakhstan) A Danilina (Serbia) A Krunić	7	3	[10]
WC	(Australia) P Hon (Czech Republic) K Muchová	7^{7}	6
6	(United States) A Muhammad (Netherlands) D Schuurs	6^{4}	1
3	V Kudermetova (Belgium) E Mertens	6	6^{4}	[10]
(Japan) M Kato (Hungary) F Stollár	2	7^{7}	[12]
(China) Y Xu (China) Z Yang	6	1	[4]
7	(Hungary) T Babos (Brazil) L Stefani	4	6	[10]

Quarterfinals
(Kazakhstan) A Danilina (Serbia) A Krunić	6^{4}	3
WC	(Australia) P Hon (Czech Republic) K Muchová	7^{7}	6
(Japan) M Kato (Hungary) F Stollár	6	6
7	(Hungary) T Babos (Brazil) L Stefani	2	4

Semifinals
WC	(Australia) P Hon (Czech Republic) K Muchová
(Japan) M Kato (Hungary) F Stollár	w/o

=== Bottom half ===
First round
5	M Andreeva; D Shnaider	1	5
(Slovakia) T Mihalíková (United Kingdom) O Nicholls	6	7
(United States) S Kenin (United States) M Kessler	5	4
(Norway) U Eikeri (Mexico) G Olmos	7	6
Alt	(Czech Republic) L Nosková (Slovakia) R Šramková	2	1
(Japan) S Aoyama (Spain) C Bucșa	6	6
(Chinese Taipei) H-c Chan (China) X Jiang	7	4	[9]
4	(Chinese Taipei) S-w Hsieh (Latvia) J Ostapenko	5	6	[11]
8	(China) H Guo; A Panova	4	6^{6}
K Rakhimova (Germany) L Siegemund	6	7^{8}
PR	(Australia) M Joint (United States) C McNally	6^{7}	7	[5]
(Japan) E Hozumi (Chinese Taipei) F-h Wu	7^{9}	5	[10]
(Romania) J Cristian (Canada) L Fernandez	6	3	[7]
(Ukraine) L Kichenok (Australia) E Perez	4	6	[10]
I Khromacheva (Indonesia) A Sutjiadi	3	2
2	(Italy) S Errani (Italy) J Paolini	6	6

Second round
(Slovakia) T Mihalíková (United Kingdom) O Nicholls	6	6
(Norway) U Eikeri (Mexico) G Olmos	0	4
(Japan) S Aoyama (Spain) C Bucșa	1	6	[4]
4	(Chinese Taipei) S-w Hsieh (Latvia) J Ostapenko	6	3	[10]
K Rakhimova (Germany) L Siegemund	6	5	[10]
(Japan) E Hozumi (Chinese Taipei) F-h Wu	1	7	[8]
(Ukraine) L Kichenok (Australia) E Perez	3	0
2	(Italy) S Errani (Italy) J Paolini	6	6

Quarterfinals
(Slovakia) T Mihalíková (United Kingdom) O Nicholls	4	3
4	(Chinese Taipei) S-w Hsieh (Latvia) J Ostapenko	6	6
K Rakhimova (Germany) L Siegemund
2	(Italy) S Errani (Italy) J Paolini	w/o

Semifinals
4	(Chinese Taipei) S-w Hsieh (Latvia) J Ostapenko	4	0
2	(Italy) S Errani (Italy) J Paolini	6	6

== Seeded teams ==
The following are the seeded teams. Seedings are based on WTA rankings as of 15 September 2025.

Country	Player	Country	Player	Rank	Seed
CAN	Gabriela Dabrowski	NZL	Erin Routliffe	7	1
ITA	Sara Errani	ITA	Jasmine Paolini	10	2
	Veronika Kudermetova	BEL	Elise Mertens	16	3
TPE	Hsieh Su-wei	LAT	Jeļena Ostapenko	19	4
	Mirra Andreeva		Diana Shnaider	22	5
USA	Asia Muhammad	NED	Demi Schuurs	32	6
HUN	Tímea Babos	BRA	Luisa Stefani	42	7
CHN	Guo Hanyu		Alexandra Panova	43	8

== Other entrants ==
=== Wildcards ===
- (Australia) Priscilla Hon / (Czech Republic) Karolína Muchová
- (China) Shao Yushan / (China) Zhang Ruien
- (China) Tang Qianhui / (China) Wang Xiyu

=== Protected ranking ===
- (Australia) Storm Hunter / (United States) Desirae Krawczyk
- (Australia) Maya Joint / (United States) Caty McNally

=== Alternates ===
- (Czech Republic) Linda Nosková / (Slovakia) Rebecca Šramková

=== Withdrawals ===
- (Czech Republic) Barbora Krejčíková / (Czech Republic) Kateřina Siniaková → replaced by (Czech Republic) Linda Nosková / (Slovakia) Rebecca Šramková
