= 2023 Rancho Santa Fe Open – Doubles =

Doubles
- 2023 Rancho Santa Fe Open

Final
- Champions: (United States) Makenna Jones (Ukraine) Yulia Starodubtseva
- Runners-up: Tatiana Prozorova (United States) Madison Sieg
- Score: 6–3, 4–6, [10–6]

Events
Singles	Doubles
← 2022 ·	Rancho Santa Fe Open	· 2024 →

Elvina Kalieva and Katarzyna Kawa were the defending champions, but Kawa chose not to participate and Kalieva compete only singles competition.

Makenna Jones and Yulia Starodubtseva won the title, defeating Tatiana Prozorova and Madison Sieg in the final, 6–3, 4–6, [10–6].

== Seeds ==
1. (United States) Jessie Aney / Maria Kozyreva (semifinals)
2. (Colombia) María Herazo González / Anastasia Tikhonova (semifinals)
3. (United States) Makenna Jones / (Ukraine) Yulia Starodubtseva (champions)
4. (Argentina) Melany Krywoj / (Argentina) Julia Riera (quarterfinals)

== Draw ==
=== Key ===
- Q = Qualifier
- WC = Wild card
- LL = Lucky loser
- Alt = Alternate
- SE = Special exempt
- PR = Protected ranking
- ITF = ITF entry
- JE = Junior exempt
- w/o = Walkover
- r = Retired
- d = Defaulted
- SR = Special ranking

=== Draw ===
First round
1	(United States) J Aney; M Kozyreva	6	6
(United States) S León (Slovakia) M Okáľová	0	3
WC	(Serbia) A Skrobonja (Romania) A Velcea	2	0
(United States) H Giavara (Switzerland) L Sun	6	6
4	(Argentina) M Krywoj (Argentina) J Riera	6	6
(United States) K Allen (United States) P Corley	4	4
T Prozorova (United States) M Sieg	w/o
(United States) E Cayetano (Morocco) Y Kabbaj
(United States) M McCray (United States) B Walker	4	3
M Kononova (India) S Yamalapalli	6	6
(Canada) B Fernandez (United States) G Price	2	1
3	(United States) M Jones (Ukraine) Y Starodubtseva	6	6
(United States) S Colling (United States) J Ronney	4	0
(Germany) J Jebawy (China) F Tian	6	6
(United States) A Zamarripa (United States) M Zamarripa	2	4
2	(Colombia) M Herazo González; A Tikhonova	6	6

Quarterfinals
1	(United States) J Aney; M Kozyreva	w/o
(United States) H Giavara (Switzerland) L Sun
4	(Argentina) M Krywoj (Argentina) J Riera	1	3
T Prozorova (United States) M Sieg	6	6
M Kononova (India) S Yamalapalli	2	5
3	(United States) M Jones (Ukraine) Y Starodubtseva	6	7
(Germany) J Jebawy (China) F Tian	3	3
2	(Colombia) M Herazo González; A Tikhonova	6	6

Semifinals
1	(United States) J Aney; M Kozyreva	7^{7}	1	[9]
T Prozorova (United States) M Sieg	6^{5}	6	[11]
3	(United States) M Jones (Ukraine) Y Starodubtseva	6	6
2	(Colombia) M Herazo González; A Tikhonova	3	3

Final
T Prozorova (United States) M Sieg	3	6	[6]
3	(United States) M Jones (Ukraine) Y Starodubtseva	6	4	[10]
