= 2022 Rancho Santa Fe Open – Singles =

Singles
- 2022 Rancho Santa Fe Open

Final
- Champion: (Mexico) Marcela Zacarías
- Runner-up: (United States) Katrina Scott
- Score: 6–1, 6–2

Events
Singles	Doubles
← 2021 ·	Rancho Santa Fe Open	· 2023 →

Rebecca Peterson was the defending champion but withdrew before her first round match.

Marcela Zacarías won the title, defeating Katrina Scott in the final, 6–1, 6–2.

== Seeds ==
1. (Sweden) Rebecca Peterson (withdrew)
2. (China) Yuan Yue (first round)
3. (United States) Katie Volynets (second round)
4. (Japan) Nao Hibino (quarterfinals)
5. (United States) Caroline Dolehide (first round)
6. (Poland) Katarzyna Kawa (first round)
7. (Canada) Carol Zhao (first round)
8. (Netherlands) Arianne Hartono (second round)

== Draw ==
=== Key ===
- Q = Qualifier
- WC = Wild card
- LL = Lucky loser
- Alt = Alternate
- SE = Special exempt
- PR = Protected ranking
- ITF = ITF entry
- JE = Junior exempt
- w/o = Walkover
- r = Retired
- d = Defaulted
- SR = Special ranking

=== Finals ===
Semifinals
(Mexico) Marcela Zacarías	3	7^{7}	6
WC	(United States) Elvina Kalieva	6	6^{5}	4
(United States) Katrina Scott	6	7^{7}
Q	(Australia) Storm Sanders	3	6^{5}

Final
(Mexico) Marcela Zacarías	6	6
(United States) Katrina Scott	1	2

=== Top half ===
First round
LL	(United States) A Reami	7	2	5
Q	(United States) H Inoue	5	6	7
(United States) W Osuigwe	3	3
(Mexico) M Zacarías	6	6
WC	(United States) D Hewitt	1	6	0
Q	(Philippines) A Eala	6	2	6
(Canada) K Sebov	4	7^{7}	6
7	(Canada) C Zhao	6	6^{5}	2
3	(United States) K Volynets	6	5	6
(Australia) A Sharma	2	7	4
D Shnaider	6	6
Q	(United States) A Rogers	2	4
(United States) C Harrison	4	6^{3}
SE	(United States) R Montgomery	6	7^{7}
WC	(United States) E Kalieva	6	7
5	(United States) C Dolehide	4	5

Second round
Q	(United States) H Inoue	1	5
(Mexico) M Zacarías	6	7
Q	(Philippines) A Eala	7^{8}	6
(Canada) K Sebov	6^{6}	2
3	(United States) K Volynets	4	6	1
D Shnaider	6	2	6
SE	(United States) R Montgomery	2	6	6^{1}
WC	(United States) E Kalieva	6	2	7^{7}

Quarterfinals
(Mexico) M Zacarías	6	7
Q	(Philippines) A Eala	2	5
D Shnaider	0	3
WC	(United States) E Kalieva	6	6

Semifinals
(Mexico) M Zacarías	3	7^{7}	6
WC	(United States) E Kalieva	6	6^{5}	4

=== Bottom half ===
First round
8	(Netherlands) A Hartono	6	6
Q	(Chinese Taipei) C-y Hsu	4	2
Q	(Australia) E Perez	2	6^{6}
(United States) K Scott	6	7^{8}
(United States) D Lao	6	6
(Mexico) R Zarazúa	2	4
WC	(Indonesia) J Tjen	2	2
4	(Japan) N Hibino	6	6
6	(Poland) K Kawa	4	3
(United States) A Krueger	6	6
(United States) S Chang	6	6
Q	(Japan) E Shibahara	1	4
Q	(Poland) U Radwańska	2	0
Q	(Australia) S Sanders	6	6
(United States) L Chirico	6	6
2	(China) Y Yuan	4	1

Second round
8	(Netherlands) A Hartono	5	4
(United States) K Scott	7	6
(United States) D Lao	3	5
4	(Japan) N Hibino	6	7
(United States) A Krueger	6	7^{7}
(United States) S Chang	3	6^{3}
Q	(Australia) S Sanders	6	6^{3}	6
(United States) L Chirico	1	7^{7}	0

Quarterfinals
(United States) K Scott	2	7	6
4	(Japan) N Hibino	6	5	2
(United States) A Krueger	2	3
Q	(Australia) S Sanders	6	6

Semifinals
(United States) K Scott	6	7^{7}
Q	(Australia) S Sanders	3	6^{5}
