= 2022 Rancho Santa Fe Open – Doubles =

Doubles
- 2022 Rancho Santa Fe Open

Final
- Champions: (United States) Elvina Kalieva (Poland) Katarzyna Kawa
- Runners-up: (Mexico) Giuliana Olmos (Mexico) Marcela Zacarías
- Score: 6–1, 3–6, [10–2]

Events
Singles	Doubles
← 2021 ·	Rancho Santa Fe Open	· 2023 →

Katarzyna Kawa and Tereza Mihalíková were the defending champions but Mihalíková chose not to participate.

Kawa partnered alongside Elvina Kalieva and successfully defended her title, defeating Giuliana Olmos and Marcela Zacarías in the final, 6–1, 3–6, [10–2].

== Seeds ==
1. (Mexico) Giuliana Olmos / (Mexico) Marcela Zacarías (final)
2. (Japan) Nao Hibino / (United States) Sabrina Santamaria (quarterfinals)
3. (Netherlands) Arianne Hartono / (Australia) Astra Sharma (quarterfinals)
4. (Australia) Ellen Perez / (Brazil) Luisa Stefani (withdrew)

== Draw ==
=== Key ===
- Q = Qualifier
- WC = Wild card
- LL = Lucky loser
- Alt = Alternate
- SE = Special exempt
- PR = Protected ranking
- ITF = ITF entry
- JE = Junior exempt
- w/o = Walkover
- r = Retired
- d = Defaulted
- SR = Special ranking

=== Draw ===
First round
1	(Mexico) G Olmos (Mexico) M Zacarías	6	6
WC	(Kazakhstan) D Detkovskaya (Serbia) A Skrobonja	4	0
WC	(Spain) C de las Heras Armenteras (United States) K Evans	7^{7}	2	[8]
(Brazil) R Pereira (Mexico) R Zarazúa	6^{4}	6	[10]
Alt	(United States) K Hui (Indonesia) J Tjen	6	3	[10]
(Chinese Taipei) C-y Hsu (Ukraine) K Volodko	1	6	[7]
(United States) C Harrison (United States) M Manasse	7^{7}	6
(United States) V Duval (Poland) U Radwańska	6^{4}	1
(United States) A Krueger (United States) R Montgomery	6	6
(United States) K Bunch (United States) S León	4	1
(United States) A Reami (United States) A Rogers	3	2
3	(Netherlands) A Hartono (Australia) A Sharma	6	6
(Japan) H Kuwata (United States) W Osuigwe	4	4
(United States) E Kalieva (Poland) K Kawa	6	6
(United States) D Hewitt (United States) A Smith	0	2
2	(Japan) N Hibino (United States) S Santamaria	6	6

Quarterfinals
1	(Mexico) G Olmos (Mexico) M Zacarías	6	6
(Brazil) R Pereira (Mexico) R Zarazúa	4	3
Alt	(United States) K Hui (Indonesia) J Tjen	w/o
(United States) C Harrison (United States) M Manasse
(United States) A Krueger (United States) R Montgomery	6	3	[10]
3	(Netherlands) A Hartono (Australia) A Sharma	3	6	[5]
(United States) E Kalieva (Poland) K Kawa	3	6	[14]
2	(Japan) N Hibino (United States) S Santamaria	6	4	[12]

Semifinals
1	(Mexico) G Olmos (Mexico) M Zacarías	6	7^{7}
Alt	(United States) K Hui (Indonesia) J Tjen	1	6^{3}
(United States) A Krueger (United States) R Montgomery
(United States) E Kalieva (Poland) K Kawa	w/o

Final
1	(Mexico) G Olmos (Mexico) M Zacarías	1	6	[2]
(United States) E Kalieva (Poland) K Kawa	6	3	[10]
