= 2025 China Open – Men's doubles =

Men's doubles
- 2025 China Open

Final
- Champions: (Finland) Harri Heliövaara (United Kingdom) Henry Patten
- Runners-up: Karen Khachanov; Andrey Rublev
- Score: 4–6, 6–3, [10–8]

Details
- Draw: 16
- Seeds: 4

Events
Singles	men	women
Doubles	men	women
- China Open

Harri Heliövaara and Henry Patten defeated Karen Khachanov and Andrey Rublev in the final, 4–6, 6–3, [10–8] to win the men's doubles tennis title at the 2025 China Open.

Simone Bolelli and Andrea Vavassori were the defending champions, but lost in the first round to Benjamin Bonzi and Tallon Griekspoor.

== Seeds ==
1. (United Kingdom) Julian Cash / (United Kingdom) Lloyd Glasspool (quarterfinals, withdrew)
2. (El Salvador) Marcelo Arévalo / (Croatia) Mate Pavić (quarterfinals)
3. (Finland) Harri Heliövaara / (United Kingdom) Henry Patten (champions)
4. (Italy) Simone Bolelli / (Italy) Andrea Vavassori (first round)

== Draw ==
Key

- Q = Qualifier
- WC = Wild card
- LL = Lucky loser
- Alt = Alternate
- ITF = ITF entry
- PR = Protected ranking
- SR = Special ranking
- SE = Special exempt
- JE = Junior exempt
- JR = Junior Accelerator Programme entrant
- CO = College Accelerator Programme entrant
- NG = Next Gen Accelerator Program entrant
- w/o = Walkover
- r = Retired
- d = Defaulted

=== Draw ===
First round
1	(United Kingdom) J Cash (United Kingdom) L Glasspool	7	6
(Italy) F Cobolli (Italy) L Sonego	5	0
K Khachanov; A Rublev	6	6
(Argentina) F Cerúndolo (France) A Müller	2	4
4	(Italy) S Bolelli (Italy) A Vavassori	5	3
(France) B Bonzi (Netherlands) T Griekspoor	7	6
(France) S Doumbia (France) F Reboul	7^{7}	6
LL	(Monaco) R Arneodo (Belgium) S Gillé	6^{4}	2
(Brazil) M Melo (Germany) A Zverev	6^{5}	4
WC	(China) Y Bu (United Kingdom) C Norrie	7^{7}	6
(Spain) A Davidovich Fokina (Australia) A de Minaur	3	4
3	(Finland) H Heliövaara (United Kingdom) H Patten	6	6
WC	(China) J Shang (China) Z Zhang	3	6^{6}
Q	(Argentina) G Andreozzi (France) M Guinard	6	7^{8}
(United Kingdom) N Skupski (Australia) J-P Smith	3	6^{6}
2	(El Salvador) M Arévalo (Croatia) M Pavić	6	7^{8}

Quarterfinals
1	(United Kingdom) J Cash (United Kingdom) L Glasspool
K Khachanov; A Rublev	w/o
(France) B Bonzi (Netherlands) T Griekspoor	5	7^{7}	[10]
(France) S Doumbia (France) F Reboul	7	6^{5}	[8]
WC	(China) Y Bu (United Kingdom) C Norrie	3	4
3	(Finland) H Heliövaara (United Kingdom) H Patten	6	6
Q	(Argentina) G Andreozzi (France) M Guinard	3	6	[11]
2	(El Salvador) M Arévalo (Croatia) M Pavić	6	3	[9]

Semifinals
K Khachanov; A Rublev	6	6
(France) B Bonzi (Netherlands) T Griekspoor	4	2
3	(Finland) H Heliövaara (United Kingdom) H Patten	7^{7}	7^{7}
Q	(Argentina) G Andreozzi (France) M Guinard	6^{5}	6^{3}

Final
K Khachanov; A Rublev	6	3	[8]
3	(Finland) H Heliövaara (United Kingdom) H Patten	4	6	[10]

== Qualifying ==
=== Seeds ===
1. (Argentina) Guido Andreozzi / (France) Manuel Guinard (qualified)
2. (Monaco) Romain Arneodo / (Belgium) Sander Gillé (qualifying competition, lucky losers)

=== Qualifiers ===
1. (Argentina) Guido Andreozzi / (France) Manuel Guinard

=== Lucky losers ===
1. (Monaco) Romain Arneodo / (Belgium) Sander Gillé

=== Qualifying draw ===
First round
1	(Argentina) Guido Andreozzi (France) Manuel Guinard	6	7^{9}
WC	(China) Wang Aoran (China) Zhou Yi	3	6^{7}
(Germany) Jakob Schnaitter (Germany) Mark Wallner	5	6	[6]
2	(Monaco) Romain Arneodo (Belgium) Sander Gillé	7	4	[10]

Qualifying competition
1	(Argentina) Guido Andreozzi (France) Manuel Guinard	6	6
2	(Monaco) Romain Arneodo (Belgium) Sander Gillé	4	4
