= 2025 China Open – Men's singles =

Men's singles
- 2025 China Open

Final
- Champion: (Italy) Jannik Sinner
- Runner-up: (United States) Learner Tien
- Score: 6–2, 6–2

Details
- Draw: 32 (4Q / 3WC)
- Seeds: 8

Events
Singles	men	women
Doubles	men	women
- China Open

Jannik Sinner defeated Learner Tien in the final, 6–2, 6–2 to win the men’s singles tennis title at the 2025 China Open. It was his second China Open title (after 2023) and 21st ATP Tour title overall.

Carlos Alcaraz was the reigning champion, but chose to compete in Tokyo instead.

== Seeds ==
1. (Italy) Jannik Sinner (champion)
2. (Germany) Alexander Zverev (quarterfinals)
3. (Australia) Alex de Minaur (semifinals)
4. (Italy) Lorenzo Musetti (quarterfinals, retired)
5. Karen Khachanov (first round)
6. Andrey Rublev (first round)
7. (Czech Republic) Jakub Menšík (quarterfinals, retired)
8. Daniil Medvedev (semifinals, retired)

== Draw ==
Key

- Q = Qualifier
- WC = Wild card
- LL = Lucky loser
- Alt = Alternate
- ITF = ITF entry
- PR = Protected ranking
- SR = Special ranking
- SE = Special exempt
- JE = Junior exempt
- JR = Junior Accelerator Programme entrant
- CO = College Accelerator Programme entrant
- NG = Next Gen Accelerator Program entrant
- w/o = Walkover
- r = Retired
- d = Defaulted

=== Finals ===
Semifinals
1	(Italy) Jannik Sinner	6	4	6
3	(Australia) Alex de Minaur	3	6	2
(United States) Learner Tien	5	7	4
8	Daniil Medvedev	7	5	0^{r}

Final
1	(Italy) Jannik Sinner	6	6
(United States) Learner Tien	2	2

=== Top half ===
First round
1	(Italy) J Sinner	6	6
(Croatia) M Čilić	2	2
Q	(France) T Atmane	6	6
WC	(China) Z Zhang	4	2
(France) B Bonzi	6^{1}	3
(Hungary) F Marozsán	7^{7}	6
(France) A Müller	4	7^{7}	6
5	K Khachanov	6	6^{5}	4
3	(Australia) A de Minaur	6	6
WC	(China) Y Bu	4	0
Q	(Belgium) D Goffin	4	6	4
LL	(France) A Rinderknech	6	3	6
WC	(China) J Shang	6	6^{5}	5
Q	(France) A Cazaux	0	7^{7}	7
(Serbia) M Kecmanović	5	4
7	(Czech Republic) J Menšík	7	6

Second round
1	(Italy) J Sinner	6	5	6
Q	(France) T Atmane	4	7	0
(Hungary) F Marozsán	6	7^{7}
(France) A Müller	3	6^{5}
3	(Australia) A de Minaur	6	3	7^{7}
LL	(France) A Rinderknech	3	6	6^{2}
Q	(France) A Cazaux	3	6	4
7	(Czech Republic) J Menšík	6	2	6

Quarterfinals
1	(Italy) J Sinner	6	7
(Hungary) F Marozsán	1	5
3	(Australia) A de Minaur	4
7	(Czech Republic) J Menšík	1^{r}

Semifinals
1	(Italy) J Sinner	6	4	6
3	(Australia) A de Minaur	3	6	2

=== Bottom half ===
First round
6	A Rublev	6^{3}	3
(Italy) F Cobolli	7^{7}	6
(United States) L Tien	4	6	6
(Argentina) F Cerúndolo	6	3	4
Q	(France) A Mannarino	6	6
(Kazakhstan) A Bublik	3	2
(France) G Mpetshi Perricard	6^{3}	7^{7}	4
4	(Italy) L Musetti	7^{7}	6^{4}	6
8	D Medvedev	6	6
(United Kingdom) C Norrie	3	4
(Spain) A Davidovich Fokina	6	6
(Argentina) C Ugo Carabelli	1	3
(France) C Moutet	6	7
(Netherlands) T Griekspoor	4	5
(Italy) L Sonego	4	3
2	(Germany) A Zverev	6	6

Second round
(Italy) F Cobolli	3	2
(United States) L Tien	6	6
Q	(France) A Mannarino	3	3
4	(Italy) L Musetti	6	6
8	D Medvedev	6	6
(Spain) A Davidovich Fokina	3	3
(France) C Moutet	5	6	3
2	(Germany) A Zverev	7	3	6

Quarterfinals
(United States) L Tien	4	6	3
4	(Italy) L Musetti	6	3	0^{r}
8	D Medvedev	6	6
2	(Germany) A Zverev	3	3

Semifinals
(United States) L Tien	5	7	4
8	D Medvedev	7	5	0^{r}

== Qualifying ==
=== Seeds ===
1. (France) Adrian Mannarino (qualified)
2. (France) Arthur Rinderknech (qualifying competition, lucky loser)
3. (France) Térence Atmane (qualified)
4. (France) Quentin Halys (qualifying competition, retired)
5. (Netherlands) Jesper de Jong (qualifying competition)
6. (Netherlands) Botic van de Zandschulp (qualifying competition)
7. (France) Arthur Cazaux (qualified)
8. (Belgium) David Goffin (qualified)

=== Qualifiers ===
1. (France) Adrian Mannarino
2. (Belgium) David Goffin
3. (France) Térence Atmane
4. (France) Arthur Cazaux

=== Lucky loser ===
1. (France) Arthur Rinderknech

=== Qualifying draw ===
==== First qualifier ====
First round
1	(France) Adrian Mannarino	6	6
Alt	(Italy) Andrea Vavassori	3	1
(Australia) Tristan Schoolkate	6	6^{5}	4
5	(Netherlands) Jesper de Jong	4	7^{7}	6

Qualifying competition
1	(France) Adrian Mannarino	6	6
5	(Netherlands) Jesper de Jong	4	4

==== Second qualifier ====
First round
2	(France) Arthur Rinderknech	6	6
(United States) Nishesh Basavareddy	4	4
WC	(China) Zhou Yi	4	6	5
8	(Belgium) David Goffin	6	3	7

Qualifying competition
2	(France) Arthur Rinderknech	3	2
8	(Belgium) David Goffin	6	6

==== Third qualifier ====
First round
3	(France) Térence Atmane	6	6
Alt	(China) Sun Fajing	4	1
Alt	(Australia) Christopher O'Connell	2	2
6	(Netherlands) Botic van de Zandschulp	6	6

Qualifying competition
3	(France) Térence Atmane	7^{7}	7^{9}
6	(Netherlands) Botic van de Zandschulp	6^{5}	6^{7}

==== Fourth qualifier ====
First round
4	(France) Quentin Halys	6	6
WC	(China) Wang Aoran	0	2
WC	(Hong Kong) Coleman Wong	6	2	6^{5}
7	(France) Arthur Cazaux	4	6	7^{7}

Qualifying competition
4	(France) Quentin Halys	6	1^{r}
7	(France) Arthur Cazaux	4	5
