= Open ITF Arcadis Brezo Osuna =

- 2022 Open ITF Arcadis Brezo Osuna

ITF Women's Tour
- Event name: Open ITF Arcadis Brezo Osuna
- Location: Madrid, Spain
- Venue: Club Deportivo Brezo Osuna
- Category: ITF Women's World Tennis Tour
- Surface: Hard / outdoor
- Draw: 48S/32Q/16D
- Prize money: $60,000

The Open ITF Arcadis Brezo Osuna is a tournament for professional female tennis players played on outdoor hardcourts. The event is classified as a $60,000 ITF Women's World Tennis Tour tournament and has been held in Madrid, Spain, since 2011.

== Past finals ==
=== Singles ===
Year	Champion	Runner-up	Score
2023	Tatiana Prozorova	(Spain) Marta Soriano Santiago	6–3, 6–1
2022	(Spain) Marina Bassols Ribera	(Philippines) Alex Eala	6–4, 7–5
2021	(United States) Robin Anderson	(Australia) Olivia Gadecki	6–3, 6–7^{(3–7)}, 7–6^{(10–8)}
2020	cancelled due to the COVID-19 pandemic		
2019	(Spain) Yvonne Cavallé Reimers	(Romania) Ioana Loredana Roșca	7–6^{(7–4)}, 5–7, 7–6^{(7–3)}
2018	not held		
2017	(Spain) Nuria Párrizas Díaz	(Switzerland) Rebeka Masarova	6–4, 4–6, 6–2
2016	(Spain) Nuria Párrizas Díaz	(Spain) Cristina Bucșa	6–4, 3–6, 7–5
2015	(United Kingdom) Katie Swan	(Spain) Cristina Sánchez Quintanar	6–7^{(5–7)}, 6–2, 6–3
2014	(Ukraine) Elizaveta Ianchuk	(France) Chloé Paquet	6–2, 6–3
2012–13	not held		
2011	(Venezuela) Marina Giral Lores	(Spain) Nuria Párrizas Díaz	4–6, 6–4, 6–4

=== Doubles ===
Year	Champions	Runners-up	Score
2023	(United States) Makenna Jones (United States) Jamie Loeb	(Australia) Destanee Aiava (Turkey) Berfu Cengiz	6–4, 5–7, [10–6]
2022	(Kazakhstan) Anna Danilina; Anastasia Tikhonova	(China) Lu Jiajing (China) You Xiaodi	6–4, 6–2
2021	(Australia) Destanee Aiava (Australia) Olivia Gadecki	(Japan) Mana Ayukawa (South Korea) Han Na-lae	6–3, 6–3
2020	cancelled due to the COVID-19 pandemic		
2019	(Lithuania) Justina Mikulskytė (United States) Christina Rosca	(Romania) Ioana Loredana Roșca (Bulgaria) Julia Terziyska	6–3, 6–7^{(8–10)}, [10–8]
2018	not held		
2017	(United Kingdom) Alicia Barnett (United Kingdom) Olivia Nicholls	(Spain) Marina Bassols Ribera (Spain) Júlia Payola	6–1, 6–2
2016	(Spain) Arabela Fernández Rabener (Ecuador) Charlotte Römer	(Spain) Ainhoa Atucha Gómez (Spain) María José Luque Moreno	6–2, 2–6, [10–4]
2015	(Spain) Estrella Cabeza Candela (Spain) Cristina Sánchez Quintanar	(Spain) María Martínez Martínez (Spain) Olga Sáez Larra	6–4, 6–3
2014	(Spain) Aliona Bolsova (Spain) Olga Sáez Larra	(Spain) Marta González Encinas (Spain) Estela Pérez Somarriba	6–1, 6–4
2012–13	not held		
2011	(Germany) Kim-Alice Grajdek (Poland) Justyna Jegiołka	(Argentina) Vanesa Furlanetto (Argentina) Aranza Salut	6–3, 6–3
