= Rancho Santa Fe Open =

- 2024 Rancho Santa Fe Open

ITF Women's Tour
- Event name: Rancho Santa Fe Open
- Location: Rancho Santa Fe, California, United States
- Venue: Rancho Santa Fe Tennis Club
- Category: ITF Women's World Tennis Tour
- Surface: Hard / Outdoor
- Draw: 32S/32Q/16D
- Prize money: $60,000
- Website: www.rsfassociation.org

The Rancho Santa Fe Open is a tournament for professional female tennis players played on outdoor hardcourts. The event is classified as a $60,000 ITF Women's World Tennis Tour tournament and has been held in Rancho Santa Fe, California, United States, since 2011. From 2011 to 2020, the tournament was a $25k event and held regularly in February. In 2021, the tournament was upgraded to $60,000 and moved to October.

== Past finals ==
=== Singles ===
Year	Champion	Runner-up	Score
2024	(United States) Iva Jovic	(Japan) Ena Shibahara	6–3, 6–3
2023	(Ukraine) Yulia Starodubtseva	(Switzerland) Lulu Sun	7–5, 6–3
2022	(Mexico) Marcela Zacarías	(United States) Katrina Scott	6–1, 6–2
2021	(Sweden) Rebecca Peterson	(United States) Elvina Kalieva	6–4, 6–0
2020	(China) You Xiaodi	(Slovakia) Rebecca Šramková	6–4, 7–6^{(7–5)}
2019	(United States) Nicole Gibbs	(United States) Kristie Ahn	6–3, 6–3
2018	(United States) Asia Muhammad	(Japan) Kurumi Nara	6–4, 2–6, 7–6^{(7–3)}
2017	(Canada) Bianca Andreescu	(United States) Kayla Day	6–4, 6–1
2016	(China) Zhang Shuai	(United States) Vania King	1–6, 7–5, 6–4
2015	(United States) CiCi Bellis	(United States) Maria Sanchez	6–2, 6–0
2014	(Austria) Tamira Paszek	(Japan) Shuko Aoyama	6–1, 6–1
2013	(United States) Madison Brengle	(United States) Nicole Gibbs	6–1, 6–4
2012	(United States) Julia Boserup	(United States) Lauren Davis	6–0, 6–3
2011	(Portugal) Michelle Larcher de Brito	(United States) Madison Brengle	3–6, 6–4, 6–1

=== Doubles ===
Year	Champions	Runners-up	Score
2024	Maria Kononova; Maria Kozyreva	(United States) Haley Giavara (United States) Rasheeda McAdoo	6–2, 7–6^{(7–4)}
2023	(United States) Makenna Jones (Ukraine) Yulia Starodubtseva	Tatiana Prozorova (United States) Madison Sieg	6–3, 4–6, [10–6]
2022	(United States) Elvina Kalieva (Poland) Katarzyna Kawa (2)	(Mexico) Giuliana Olmos (Mexico) Marcela Zacarías	6–1, 3–6, [10–2]
2021	(Poland) Katarzyna Kawa (Slovakia) Tereza Mihalíková	(Chinese Taipei) Liang En-shuo (Canada) Rebecca Marino	6–3, 4–6, [10–6]
2020	(United States) Kayla Day (2) (United States) Sophia Whittle	(Hong Kong) Eudice Chong (China) You Xiaodi	6–2, 5–7, [10–7]
2019	(United States) Hayley Carter (United States) Ena Shibahara	(United States) Francesca Di Lorenzo (United States) Caty McNally	7–5, 6–2
2018	(United States) Kaitlyn Christian (United States) Sabrina Santamaria	(Czech Republic) Eva Hrdinová (United States) Taylor Townsend	6–7^{(6–8)}, 6–1, [10–6]
2017	(United States) Kayla Day (United States) Caroline Dolehide	(Ukraine) Anhelina Kalinina (United States) Chiara Scholl	6–3, 1–6, [10–7]
2016	(United States) Asia Muhammad (3) (United States) Taylor Townsend	(United States) Jessica Pegula (Canada) Carol Zhao	6–3, 6–4
2015	(United States) Samantha Crawford (2) (United States) Asia Muhammad (2)	(Turkey) İpek Soylu (Serbia) Nina Stojanović	6–0, 6–3
2014	(United States) Samantha Crawford (China) Xu Yifan	(United States) Danielle Lao (United States) Keri Wong	3–6, 6–2, [12–10]
2013	(United States) Asia Muhammad (United States) Allie Will	(United States) Anamika Bhargava (United States) Macall Harkins	6–1, 6–4
2012	(United States) Maria Sanchez (United States) Yasmin Schnack	(Ukraine) Irina Buryachok (Ukraine) Elizaveta Ianchuk	7–6^{(7–4)}, 4–6, [10–8]
2011	(United States) Julie Ditty (Bosnia and Herzegovina) Mervana Jugić-Salkić	(Japan) Shuko Aoyama (Japan) Remi Tezuka	6–0, 6–2
