= Makenna Jones =

American tennis player (born 1998)

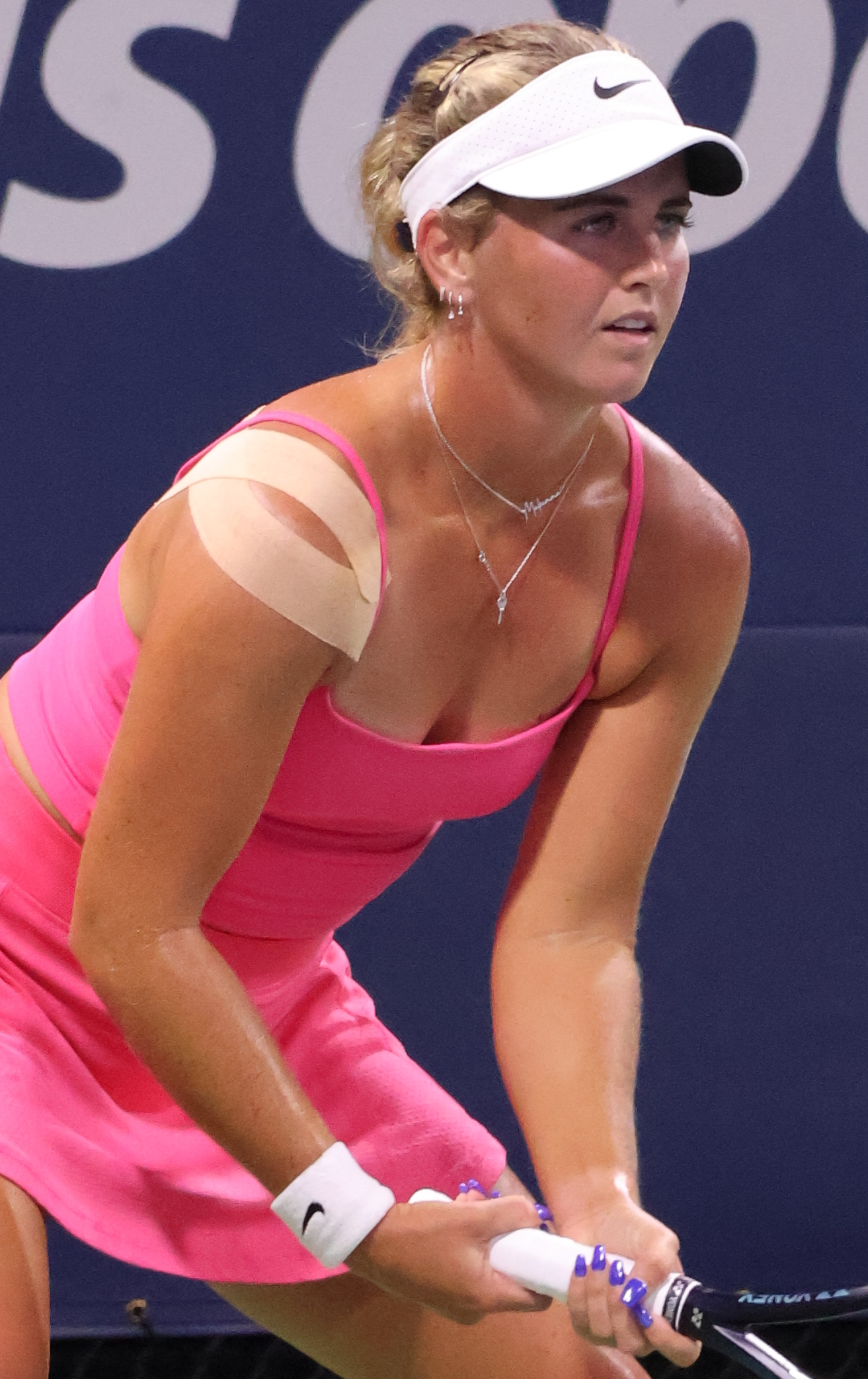
- Jones at the 2023 US Open
- Country (sports): United States
- Born: February 26, 1998 (age 27)
- Plays: Right-handed
- College: North Carolina
- Coach: Kelly Jones
- Prize money: $171,953

Singles
- Career record: 122–85
- Career titles: 3 ITF
- Highest ranking: No. 236 (October 23, 2023)
- Current ranking: No. 562 (October 27, 2025)

Grand Slam singles results
- US Open: Q1 (2023)

Doubles
- Career record: 113–57
- Career titles: 15 ITF
- Highest ranking: No. 107 (July 3, 2023)
- Current ranking: No. 155 (October 27, 2025)

Grand Slam doubles results
- Wimbledon: 1R (2023)
- US Open: 1R (2021, 2023)
- Last updated on: 29 October 2025.

Makenna Jones (born February 26, 1998) is an American tennis player. She has a career-high singles ranking by the WTA of 236, achieved October 23, 2023, and a best doubles ranking of 107, set on July 3, 2023.

Jones played college tennis at the University of North Carolina at Chapel Hill, where she won the 2021 NCAA doubles championships with partner Elizabeth Scotty.

== Professional ==
Jones made her WTA Tour main-draw debut at the 2021 Silicon Valley Classic, where she received a wildcard into the doubles tournament. She also received a wildcard for the 2021 US Open, partnering Elizabeth Scotty.

She received another wildcard for the 2023 Miami Open, partnering Sloane Stephens.

Jones also received a wildcard for the 2023 US Open singles qualifying competition and for the main draw in doubles, partnering Jamie Loeb.

Makenna is coached by her father, former world nomber-one doubles player, Kelly Jones.

== ITF Circuit finals ==
=== Singles: 4 (3 titles, 1 runner-up) ===
Legend W25 tournaments (2–0) W15 tournaments (1–1)	Finals by surface Hard (2–1) Clay (1–0)

Result	W–L	Date	Tournament	Tier	Surface	Opponents	Score
Win	1–0	Jun 2022	ITF San Diego, United States	W15	Hard	(United States) Megan McCray	3–6, 6–3, 6–3
Loss	1–1	Jul 2022	ITF Fountain Valley, US	W15	Hard	(Chinese Taipei) Yang Ya-yi	2–6, 2–6
Win	2–1	Apr 2023	ITF Zephyrhills, US	W25	Clay	(United States) Hanna Chang	5–7, 6–4, 6–1
Win	3–1	Jun 2023	ITF Madrid, Spain	W25	Hard	(Japan) Sakura Hosogi	6–2, 6–3

=== Doubles: 21 (15 titles, 6 runner-ups) ===
Legend W100 tournaments (1–1) W60 tournaments (4–1) W40/50 tournaments (1–0) W25/35 tournaments (6–3) W15 tournaments (3–1)	Finals by surface Hard (7–4) Clay (8–2)

Result	W–L	Date	Tournament	Tier	Surface	Partner	Opponents	Score
Win	1–0	Jun 2022	ITF San Diego, US	W15	Hard	(United States) Kimmi Hance	(Russia) Maria Kozyreva (Belarus) Veronika Miroshnichenko	6–3, 6–3
Loss	1–1	Jun 2022	ITF San Diego, US	W15	Hard	(United States) Sara Daavettila	(Thailand) Bunyawi Thamchaiwat (Chinese Taipei) Yang Ya-yi	3–6, 4–6
Win	2–1	Jul 2022	ITF Lakewood, US	W15	Hard	(United States) Brienne Minor	(United States) Taylor Cataldi (United States) Isabella Chhiv	6–4, 6–0
Win	3–1	Jan 2023	ITF Naples, US	W25	Clay	(United States) Reese Brantmeier	(United Kingdom) Emily Appleton (United States) Quinn Gleason	6–4, 6–2
Win	4–1	Jan 2023	Vero Beach International Open, US	W60	Clay	(United States) Francesca Di Lorenzo	(United States) Quinn Gleason (France) Elixane Lechemia	4–6, 6–3, [10–3]
Loss	4–2	Mar 2023	ITF Boca Raton, US	W25	Clay	(United States) Francesca Di Lorenzo	(United States) Hailey Baptiste (United States) Whitney Osuigwe	2–6, 2–6
Win	5–2	Mar 2023	ITF Boca Raton, US	W25	Clay	(United States) Jamie Loeb	(United States) Sofia Sewing (Hungary) Fanny Stollár	5–7, 6–3, [10–8]
Win	6–2	May 2023	Bonita Springs Championship, US	W100	Clay	(United States) Jamie Loeb	(United States) Ashlyn Krueger (United States) Robin Montgomery	5–7, 6–4, [10–2]
Win	7–2	May 2023	ITF Orlando, US	W25	Clay	(United States) Maria Mateas	(Serbia) Katarina Jokić (United States) Dalayna Hewitt	6–4, 6–2
Win	8–2	May 2023	ITF Pelham, US	W60	Clay	(United States) Jamie Loeb	(United States) Robin Anderson (Australia) Elysia Bolton	6–4, 7–5
Win	9–2	Jun 2023	Open Madrid Arcadis, Spain	W60	Hard	(United States) Jamie Loeb	(Australia) Destanee Aiava (Turkey) Berfu Cengiz	6–4, 5–7, [10–6]
Win	10–2	Jun 2023	ITF Tauste-Zaragoza, Spain	W25+H	Hard	(United States) Jamie Loeb	(China) Gao Xinyu (Russia) Ekaterina Ovcharenko	6–2, 5–7, [10–6]
Loss	10–3	Jul 2023	Dallas Summer Series, US	W60	Hard	(United States) Jamie Loeb	(United States) Sophie Chang (United States) Ashley Lahey	2–6, 2–6
Win	11–3	Oct 2023	Rancho Santa Fe Open, US	W60	Hard	(Ukraine) Yulia Starodubtseva	(Russia) Tatiana Prozorova (United States) Madison Sieg	6–3, 4–6, [10–6]
Loss	11–4	Sep 2024	ITF San Rafael, US	W35	Hard	(United States) Jamie Loeb	(United States) Robin Anderson (United States) Alana Smith	5–7, 2–6
Win	12–4	Oct 2024	ITF Hilton Head Island, US	W35	Hard	(United States) Fiona Crawley	(Kenya) Angella Okutoyi (Egypt) Merna Refaat	6–2, 6–7^{(5)}, [10–7]
Loss	12–5	Oct 2024	ITF Norman, US	W35	Hard (i)	(South Korea) Park So-hyun	(United States) Jessica Failla (United States) Maribella Zamarripa	6–3, 2–6, [5–10]
Win	13–5	Nov 2024	ITF Clemson, US	W15	Hard	(United States) Sara Daavettila	(Poland) Olivia Bergler (France) Sophia Biolay	6–0, 6–2
Win	14–5	Dec 2024	ITF Tampa, US	W50	Clay	(United States) Alana Smith	(United States) Lexington Reed (United States) Mia Yamakita	7–5, 6–1
Win	15–5	Mar 2025	ITF Antalya, Turkiye	W35	Clay	(Bulgaria) Lia Karatancheva	(Romania) Ilinca Amariei (Romania) Cristina Dinu	6–2, 6–2
Loss	15–6	Apr 2025	Bonita Springs Championship, US	W100	Clay	(United States) Angela Kulikov	(Russia) Maria Kozyreva (Belarus) Iryna Shymanovich	2–6, 2–6
