= Haley Giavara =

American tennis player (born 2000)

- Country (sports): United States
- Born: 16 October 2000 (age 25) San Diego, California
- Plays: Right-handed
- College: University of California, Berkeley
- Coach: Ken Giavara
- Prize money: $137,554

Singles
- Career record: 146–150
- Career titles: 1 ITF
- Highest ranking: No. 327 (4 May 2026)
- Current ranking: No. 331 (18 May 2026)

Doubles
- Career record: 127–93
- Career titles: 14 ITF
- Highest ranking: No. 189 (18 November 2024)
- Current ranking: No. 251 (18 May 2026)
- Last updated on: 21 May 2026.

Haley Giavara (born 16 October 2000) is an American tennis player.

== Early life ==
Raised in San Diego, California by Jada Coleman and Jason Giavara, she attended Serra High School. She also ran track and played lacrosse at school. She started at University of California, Berkeley in 2019. She was coached as a youngster by her uncle, Ken Giavara, who runs the Giavara Tennis Academy along with her father, Jason. She is African American.

== Career ==
=== University ===
In December 2022, Giavara represented Team USA in a national university team tennis tournament in France.

=== Professional ===
A graduate of University of California, Berkeley, she earned a wildcard into the 2024 Indian Wells Open qualifying in 2023 through the USTA SoCal Pro Series. She won her first W50 title in doubles at the 2024 Kunming Open.

== ITF Circuit finals ==
=== Singles: 3 (1 title, 2 runner-ups) ===
Legend W35 tournaments W15 tournaments	Finals by surface Hard (1–2)

Result	W–L	Date	Tournament	Tier	Surface	Opponent	Score
Win	1–0	Jul 2023	ITF Irvine, United States	W15	Hard	(China) Lu Jiajing	6–1, 6–3
Loss	1–1	Jul 2023	ITF Lakewood, United States	W15	Hard	(United States) Reese Brantmeier	4–6, 4–6
Loss	1–2	Aug 2024	ITF Aldershot, United Kingdom	W35	Hard	(United Kingdom) Mingge Xu	4–6, 1–6

=== Doubles: 20 (14 titles, 6 runner-ups) ===
Legend W60/75 tournaments W40/50 tournaments W35 tournaments W15 tournaments	Finals by surface Hard (10–3) Clay (4–3)

Result	W–L	Date	Tournament	Tier	Surface	Partner	Opponents	Score
Win	1–0	Jul 2023	ITF Irvine, United States	W15	Hard	(United States) Katherine Hui	(United States) Eryn Cayetano (United States) Isabella Chiv	6–2, 6–4
Loss	1–1	Jul 2023	ITF Feira de Santana, Brazil	W60	Hard	(United States) Abigail Rencheli	(France) Léolia Jeanjean (Ukraine) Valeriya Strakhova	5–7, 4–6
Win	2–1	Nov 2023	ITF Guadalajara, Mexico	W40	Clay	(Canada) Layne Sleeth	(Russia) Veronika Miroshnichenko (Sweden) Fanny Östlund	6–4, 6–3
Loss	2–2	Jan 2024	ITF Arcadia, United States	W35	Hard	(United States) Brandy Walker	(United States) Angela Kulikov (United States) Ashley Lahey	3–6, 2–6
Win	3–2	Jan 2024	ITF Le Gosier, Guadeloupe	W35	Hard	(United States) Jaeda Daniel	(France) Émeline Dartron (France) Emma Léné	6–2, 7–6^{(0)}
Win	4–2	May 2024	Kunming Open, China	W50	Clay	(Chinese Taipei) Li Yu-yun	(China) Feng Shuo (South Korea) Park So-hyun	6–3, 6–1
Win	5–2	May 2024	ITF San Diego, United States	W15	Hard	(United States) Kelly Keller	(United States) Dasha Ivanova (Sweden) Lisa Zaar	2–6, 6–2, [10–5]
Loss	5–3	Jul 2024	ITF Køge, Denmark	W35	Clay	(Romania) Oana Gavrilă	(Czech Republic) Denisa Hindová (Czech Republic) Karolína Kubáňová	3–6, 2–6
Win	6–3	Aug 2024	ITF Verbier, Switzerland	W35	Clay	(Latvia) Diāna Marcinkēviča	(Algeria) Inès Ibbou (Switzerland) Naïma Karamoko	2–6, 6–3, [10–7]
Loss	6–4	Sep 2024	Rancho Santa Fe Open, United States	W75	Hard	(United States) Rasheeda McAdoo	(Russia) Maria Kononova (Russia) Maria Kozyreva	2–6, 6–7^{(4)}
Win	7–4	Nov 2024	ITF Chihuahua City, Mexico	W50	Hard	(United States) Dalayna Hewitt	(Czech Republic) Laura Samson (Mexico) Ana Sofía Sánchez	6–1, 6–3
Win	8–4	Nov 2024	ITF Santo Domingo, Dominican Republic	W35	Hard	(Japan) Hiroko Kuwata	(United States) Kolie Allen (Colombia) Yuliana Monroy	5–7, 6–4, [10–6]
Win	9–4	May 2025	ITF Indian Harbour Beach, United States	W50	Clay	(Australia) Alexandra Osborne	(United Kingdom) Tara Moore (United States) Abigail Rencheli	6–3, 3–6, [10–7]
Loss	9–5	May 2025	ITF Bethany Beach, United States	W35	Clay	(Japan) Haruna Arakawa	(United States) Ivana Corley (United States) Jaeda Daniel	4–6, 5–7
Win	10–5	May 2025	ITF San Diego, United States	W15	Hard	(Ukraine) Anita Sahdiieva	(Australia) Lily Fairclough (Australia) Lily Taylor	6–1, 6–3
Win	11–5	Jun 2025	ITF Lakewood, United States	W15	Hard	(United States) Eryn Cayetano	(United States) Jordyn McBride (United States) Kristina Nordikyan	6–0, 6–1
Win	12–5	Jul 2025	ITF Florence, United States	W35	Hard	(Japan) Hiroko Kuwata	(Venezuela) Sofía Elena Cabezas Domínguez (United States) Kylie Collins	6–0, 6–4
Win	13–5	Feb 2026	ITF Las Vegas, United States	W35	Hard	(Italy) Anastasia Abbagnato	(Mexico) Jessica Hinojosa Gómez (Ecuador) Mell Reasco	6–3, 4–6, [10–8]
Win	14–5	Feb 2026	Arcadia Open, United States	W35	Hard	(United States) Eryn Cayetano	(United States) Jaeda Daniel (Ukraine) Anita Sahdiieva	6–1, 6–1
Loss	14–6	May 2026	ITF Bethany Beach, United States	W35	Clay	(United States) Eryn Cayetano	(United States) Savannah Broadus (United States) Kylie Collins	0–6, 5–7
