= 2024 ITF Women's World Tennis Tour (July–September) =

Tennis competition

The 2024 ITF Women's World Tennis Tour was the 2024 edition of the second-tier tour for women's professional tennis. It was organised by the International Tennis Federation and was a tier below the WTA Tour. The ITF Women's World Tennis Tour included tournaments in five categories with prize money ranging from $15,000 up to $100,000.

== Key ==
Category
W100 tournaments ($100,000)
W75 tournaments ($60,000)
W50 tournaments ($40,000)
W35 tournaments ($25,000)
W15 tournaments ($15,000)

== Month ==
=== July ===
Week of	Tournament	Winner	Runners-up	Semifinalists	Quarterfinalists
July 1	Open International Féminin de Montpellier; Montpellier, France; Clay; W75; Singles – Doubles	(Poland) Maja Chwalińska; 6–3, 6–2	Oksana Selekhmeteva	(Switzerland) Jil Teichmann (Japan) Sara Saito	(Belgium) Marie Benoît (Spain) Nuria Párrizas Díaz (Lithuania) Justina Mikulskytė (Cyprus) Raluca Șerban
July 1	Open International Féminin de Montpellier; Montpellier, France; Clay; W75; Singles – Doubles	(Croatia) Mariana Dražić; Iryna Shymanovich; 1–6, 6–4, [10–8]	Elena Pridankina; Ekaterina Yashina	(Switzerland) Jil Teichmann (Japan) Sara Saito	(Belgium) Marie Benoît (Spain) Nuria Párrizas Díaz (Lithuania) Justina Mikulskytė (Cyprus) Raluca Șerban
July 1	Stuttgart-Vaihingen, Germany; Clay; W35; Singles and doubles draws	(Germany) Ella Seidel; 6–4, 6–3	(Romania) Cristina Dinu	(Czech Republic) Julie Štruplová (Romania) Miriam Bulgaru	(Germany) Marie Vogt (Germany) Lara Schmidt (Mexico) Victoria Rodríguez (Japan) Yuki Naito
July 1	Stuttgart-Vaihingen, Germany; Clay; W35; Singles and doubles draws	(Romania) Cristina Dinu (Slovenia) Nika Radišić; 3–6, 6–4, [10–4]	(Netherlands) Jasmijn Gimbrère (Netherlands) Stéphanie Visscher	(Czech Republic) Julie Štruplová (Romania) Miriam Bulgaru	(Germany) Marie Vogt (Germany) Lara Schmidt (Mexico) Victoria Rodríguez (Japan) Yuki Naito
July 1	Hong Kong, Hong Kong; Hard; W35; Singles and doubles draws	(Hong Kong) Eudice Chong; 6–3, 6–3	(China) Yao Xinxin	(Japan) Haruka Kaji (Japan) Himeno Sakatsume	(South Korea) Ku Yeon-woo (Japan) Hiromi Abe; Tatiana Prozorova (Hong Kong) Cody Wong
July 1	Hong Kong, Hong Kong; Hard; W35; Singles and doubles draws	(Hong Kong) Eudice Chong (Hong Kong) Cody Wong; 6–4, 3–6, [10–7]	(Japan) Hiromi Abe (Japan) Saki Imamura	(Japan) Haruka Kaji (Japan) Himeno Sakatsume	(South Korea) Ku Yeon-woo (Japan) Hiromi Abe; Tatiana Prozorova (Hong Kong) Cody Wong
July 1	BMW Roma Cup; Rome, Italy; Clay; W35; Singles and doubles draws	(Italy) Nuria Brancaccio; 7–6^{(8–6)}, 6–1	(United States) Varvara Lepchenko	(Italy) Tatiana Pieri (Spain) Carlota Martínez Círez	(Hungary) Fanny Stollár (Chile) Fernanda Labraña (Switzerland) Leonie Küng (Italy) Eleonora Alvisi
July 1	BMW Roma Cup; Rome, Italy; Clay; W35; Singles and doubles draws	(Spain) Yvonne Cavallé Reimers (Italy) Aurora Zantedeschi; 6–4, 6–4	(Switzerland) Leonie Küng (United States) Rasheeda McAdoo	(Italy) Tatiana Pieri (Spain) Carlota Martínez Círez	(Hungary) Fanny Stollár (Chile) Fernanda Labraña (Switzerland) Leonie Küng (Italy) Eleonora Alvisi
July 1	Amstelveen Women's Open; Amstelveen, Netherlands; Clay; W35; Singles and doubles draws	(Australia) Jaimee Fourlis; 7–6^{(7–2)}, 2–6, 6–1	(Turkey) Berfu Cengiz	(Netherlands) Anouk Koevermans (Belgium) Sofia Costoulas	(Germany) Mina Hodzic (Australia) Petra Hule (Germany) Mona Barthel (Germany) Katharina Hobgarski
July 1	Amstelveen Women's Open; Amstelveen, Netherlands; Clay; W35; Singles and doubles draws	(Netherlands) Michaëlla Krajicek (Netherlands) Eva Vedder; Walkover	Victoria Kan; Ekaterina Makarova	(Netherlands) Anouk Koevermans (Belgium) Sofia Costoulas	(Germany) Mina Hodzic (Australia) Petra Hule (Germany) Mona Barthel (Germany) Katharina Hobgarski
July 1	Hillcrest, South Africa; Hard; W35; Singles and doubles draws	(South Africa) Zoë Kruger; 6–2, 6–3	Ksenia Laskutova	(Italy) Lara Pfeifer (Serbia) Darja Suvirđonkova	(Italy) Sofia Avataneo (Belgium) Eliessa Vanlangendonck (Italy) Maddalena Giordano (Italy) Matilde Mariani
July 1	Hillcrest, South Africa; Hard; W35; Singles and doubles draws	Ksenia Laskutova (Italy) Verena Meliss; 6–2, 7–5	(South Africa) Isabella Kruger (South Africa) Zoë Kruger	(Italy) Lara Pfeifer (Serbia) Darja Suvirđonkova	(Italy) Sofia Avataneo (Belgium) Eliessa Vanlangendonck (Italy) Maddalena Giordano (Italy) Matilde Mariani
July 1	Getxo, Spain; Clay (i); W35; Singles and doubles draws	(Argentina) Solana Sierra; 6–2, 6–1	(Spain) Lucía Cortez Llorca	(Spain) Ángela Fita Boluda (Ukraine) Oleksandra Oliynykova	(Italy) Nicole Fossa Huergo (Greece) Michaela Laki (Finland) Laura Hietaranta; Alina Charaeva
July 1	Getxo, Spain; Clay (i); W35; Singles and doubles draws	(United States) Anna Rogers (United States) Alana Smith; 6–0, 7–6^{(9–7)}	(Greece) Martha Matoula (Australia) Seone Mendez	(Spain) Ángela Fita Boluda (Ukraine) Oleksandra Oliynykova	(Italy) Nicole Fossa Huergo (Greece) Michaela Laki (Finland) Laura Hietaranta; Alina Charaeva
July 1	Nakhon Si Thammarat, Thailand; Hard; W35; Singles and doubles draws	(Thailand) Patcharin Cheapchandej; 6–2, 6–3	(Japan) Kyōka Okamura	(Thailand) Peangtarn Plipuech (Japan) Eri Shimizu	(Japan) Ayano Shimizu (Japan) Haruna Arakawa (New Zealand) Monique Barry (South Korea) Jeong Bo-young
July 1	Nakhon Si Thammarat, Thailand; Hard; W35; Singles and doubles draws	(South Korea) Jeong Bo-young (Japan) Rinon Okuwaki; 2–6, 7–5, [10–7]	(India) Vaidehi Chaudhari (Thailand) Peangtarn Plipuech	(Thailand) Peangtarn Plipuech (Japan) Eri Shimizu	(Japan) Ayano Shimizu (Japan) Haruna Arakawa (New Zealand) Monique Barry (South Korea) Jeong Bo-young
July 1	Tianjin, China; Hard; W15; Singles and doubles draws	(China) Huang Yujia; 7–5, 6–4	(Indonesia) Priska Madelyn Nugroho	(China) Chen Mengyi (China) Guo Meiqi	(Kazakhstan) Gozal Ainitdinova (China) Sun Yifan (China) Xun Fangying; Anna Snigireva
July 1	Tianjin, China; Hard; W15; Singles and doubles draws	(China) Huang Yujia (China) Xun Fangying; 6–0, 6–1	(China) Aitiyaguli Aixirefu (China) Wang Jiaqi	(China) Chen Mengyi (China) Guo Meiqi	(Kazakhstan) Gozal Ainitdinova (China) Sun Yifan (China) Xun Fangying; Anna Snigireva
July 1	Mogyoród, Hungary; Clay; W15; Singles and doubles draws	(Spain) Cristina Díaz Adrover; 6–4, 1–6, 6–3	(Slovakia) Eszter Méri	(Switzerland) Alina Granwehr (Slovakia) Sofia Milatová	(Hungary) Amarissa Kiara Tóth (Slovakia) Salma Drugdová (Czech Republic) Linda Ševčíková (Czech Republic) Kateřina Mandelíková
July 1	Mogyoród, Hungary; Clay; W15; Singles and doubles draws	(Czech Republic) Kateřina Mandelíková (Slovakia) Ingrid Vojčináková; 6–2, 7–5	(Hungary) Panna Bartha (Switzerland) Katerina Tsygourova	(Switzerland) Alina Granwehr (Slovakia) Sofia Milatová	(Hungary) Amarissa Kiara Tóth (Slovakia) Salma Drugdová (Czech Republic) Linda Ševčíková (Czech Republic) Kateřina Mandelíková
July 1	Galați, Romania; Clay; W15; Singles and doubles draws	(Romania) Patricia Maria Țig; 6–4, 6–2	(Romania) Elena Ruxandra Bertea	(Spain) Sara Dols (Romania) Karola Patricia Bejenaru	(Romania) Lavinia Tănăsie (Romania) Georgia Crăciun (Romania) Ioana Zvonaru (Netherlands) Demi Tran
July 1	Galați, Romania; Clay; W15; Singles and doubles draws	(Romania) Mara Gae (Romania) Lavinia Tănăsie; 6–2, 6–1	(Poland) Olivia Bergler (Ukraine) Mariya Poduraeva	(Spain) Sara Dols (Romania) Karola Patricia Bejenaru	(Romania) Lavinia Tănăsie (Romania) Georgia Crăciun (Romania) Ioana Zvonaru (Netherlands) Demi Tran
July 1	Kuršumlijska Banja, Serbia; Clay; W15; Singles and doubles draws	(Kazakhstan) Zhibek Kulambayeva; 2–6, 6–4, 6–2	(Sweden) Lisa Zaar	(Czech Republic) Michaela Bayerlová (Germany) Emily Welker	(Romania) Carmen Andreea Herea (Romania) Ștefania Bojică (Bulgaria) Julia Stamatova (Ukraine) Anastasiya Zaparyniuk
July 1	Kuršumlijska Banja, Serbia; Clay; W15; Singles and doubles draws	(New Zealand) Valentina Ivanov (Sweden) Lisa Zaar; 6–4, 6–7^{(1–7)}, [10–8]	(Czech Republic) Michaela Bayerlová (Australia) Jelena Cvijanovic	(Czech Republic) Michaela Bayerlová (Germany) Emily Welker	(Romania) Carmen Andreea Herea (Romania) Ștefania Bojică (Bulgaria) Julia Stamatova (Ukraine) Anastasiya Zaparyniuk
July 1	Monastir, Tunisia; Hard; W15; Singles and doubles draws	(France) Yasmine Mansouri; 6–3, 6–1	(Spain) Noelia Bouzó Zanotti	Anastasia Gasanova (Egypt) Lamis Alhussein Abdel Aziz	(Germany) Gina Marie Dittmann (Kosovo) Arlinda Rushiti (Spain) Berta Passola (Germany) Anja Wildgruber
July 1	Monastir, Tunisia; Hard; W15; Singles and doubles draws	(Egypt) Lamis Alhussein Abdel Aziz; Aglaya Fedorova; 6–3, 3–6, [10–5]	(Romania) Alexandra Iordache (Estonia) Liisa Varul	Anastasia Gasanova (Egypt) Lamis Alhussein Abdel Aziz	(Germany) Gina Marie Dittmann (Kosovo) Arlinda Rushiti (Spain) Berta Passola (Germany) Anja Wildgruber
July 1	Lakewood, United States; Hard; W15; Singles and doubles draws	(United States) Rachel Gailis; 6–3, 6–4	(United States) India Houghton	(United States) Alexis Nguyen (France) Chloé Noël	(United States) Charlotte Chavatipon (United States) Aspen Schuman (United States) Malaika Rapolu (United States) Brandy Walker
July 1	Lakewood, United States; Hard; W15; Singles and doubles draws	(United States) Malaika Rapolu (Ukraine) Anita Sahdiieva; 6–4, 2–6, [10–8]	(United States) Carolyn Ansari (South Africa) Gabriella Broadfoot	(United States) Alexis Nguyen (France) Chloé Noël	(United States) Charlotte Chavatipon (United States) Aspen Schuman (United States) Malaika Rapolu (United States) Brandy Walker
July 8	ATV Tennis Open; Rome, Italy; Clay; W75; Singles – Doubles	Oksana Selekhmeteva; 6–1, 7–6^{(7–3)}	(North Macedonia) Lina Gjorcheska	(Croatia) Petra Marčinko (Croatia) Lea Bošković	(Spain) Guiomar Maristany (United States) Varvara Lepchenko (Italy) Georgia Pedone (Andorra) Victoria Jiménez Kasintseva
July 8	ATV Tennis Open; Rome, Italy; Clay; W75; Singles – Doubles	(Switzerland) Leonie Küng (India) Vasanti Shinde; 4–6, 6–4, [10–7]	(Italy) Matilde Paoletti (Italy) Beatrice Ricci	(Croatia) Petra Marčinko (Croatia) Lea Bošković	(Spain) Guiomar Maristany (United States) Varvara Lepchenko (Italy) Georgia Pedone (Andorra) Victoria Jiménez Kasintseva
July 8	ITF The Hague; The Hague, Netherlands; Clay; W75; Singles – Doubles	(Netherlands) Arantxa Rus; 6–1, 4–6, 6–2	(Poland) Gina Feistel	(Germany) Nastasja Schunk (Czech Republic) Dominika Šalková	(South Korea) Jang Su-jeong (Canada) Victoria Mboko (Cyprus) Raluca Șerban (Serbia) Dejana Radanović
July 8	ITF The Hague; The Hague, Netherlands; Clay; W75; Singles – Doubles	(Australia) Jaimee Fourlis (Australia) Petra Hule; 6–4, 6–2	(Netherlands) Annelin Bakker (Netherlands) Sarah van Emst	(Germany) Nastasja Schunk (Czech Republic) Dominika Šalková	(South Korea) Jang Su-jeong (Canada) Victoria Mboko (Cyprus) Raluca Șerban (Serbia) Dejana Radanović
July 8	Corroios, Portugal; Hard; W50; Singles and doubles draws	(Czech Republic) Gabriela Knutson; 6–1, 6–3	(Georgia (country)) Mariam Bolkvadze	(Czech Republic) Tereza Martincová; Valeria Savinykh	(Japan) Mai Hontama (Israel) Lina Glushko (Japan) Sayaka Ishii (Portugal) Matilde Jorge
July 8	Corroios, Portugal; Hard; W50; Singles and doubles draws	(Poland) Martyna Kubka (United States) Anna Rogers; 6–1, 6–4	(Portugal) Matilde Jorge (Australia) Elena Micic	(Czech Republic) Tereza Martincová; Valeria Savinykh	(Japan) Mai Hontama (Israel) Lina Glushko (Japan) Sayaka Ishii (Portugal) Matilde Jorge
July 8	Tianjin, China; Hard; W35; Singles and doubles draws	(United States) Hina Inoue; 6–4, 6–3	(China) Liu Fangzhou	Polina Iatcenko (China) Li Zongyu	(China) Wei Sijia (China) Wang Jiaqi (Japan) Chihiro Muramatsu (China) Shi Han
July 8	Tianjin, China; Hard; W35; Singles and doubles draws	(China) Guo Meiqi (China) Xiao Zhenghua; 6–4, 6–2	(Japan) Sakura Hosogi (Japan) Misaki Matsuda	Polina Iatcenko (China) Li Zongyu	(China) Wei Sijia (China) Wang Jiaqi (Japan) Chihiro Muramatsu (China) Shi Han
July 8	Aschaffenburg, Germany; Clay; W35; Singles and doubles draws	(United States) Madison Sieg; 6–4, 6–4	(Slovenia) Nika Radišić	(Belgium) Hanne Vandewinkel (Greece) Martha Matoula	(Switzerland) Ylena In-Albon (Germany) Emily Seibold (Germany) Lara Schmidt (Germany) Carolina Kuhl
July 8	Aschaffenburg, Germany; Clay; W35; Singles and doubles draws	(Netherlands) Jasmijn Gimbrère (Netherlands) Stéphanie Visscher; 6–1, 1–6, [10–3]	(Romania) Andreea Prisăcariu (Czech Republic) Julie Štruplová	(Belgium) Hanne Vandewinkel (Greece) Martha Matoula	(Switzerland) Ylena In-Albon (Germany) Emily Seibold (Germany) Lara Schmidt (Germany) Carolina Kuhl
July 8	Buzău, Romania; Clay; W35; Singles and doubles draws	(Spain) Kaitlin Quevedo; 3–6, 7–6^{(9–7)}, 7–6^{(8–6)}	(Romania) Patricia Maria Țig	(France) Alice Tubello (Czech Republic) Barbora Palicová	(Argentina) Solana Sierra (Ukraine) Oleksandra Oliynykova (Japan) Yuki Naito (Bulgaria) Lidia Encheva
July 8	Buzău, Romania; Clay; W35; Singles and doubles draws	(Finland) Laura Hietaranta (Slovakia) Nina Vargová; 6–3, 6–4	(Romania) Briana Szabó (Romania) Patricia Maria Țig	(France) Alice Tubello (Czech Republic) Barbora Palicová	(Argentina) Solana Sierra (Ukraine) Oleksandra Oliynykova (Japan) Yuki Naito (Bulgaria) Lidia Encheva
July 8	Don Benito, Spain; Carpet; W35; Singles and doubles draws	(Slovakia) Viktória Hrunčáková; 6–2, 3–6, 6–4	(Serbia) Natalija Stevanović	(Austria) Tamira Paszek (Czech Republic) Linda Klimovičová	(Turkey) Pemra Özgen (Austria) Tamara Kostic (Spain) Olga Parres Azcoitia; Vitalia Diatchenko
July 8	Don Benito, Spain; Carpet; W35; Singles and doubles draws	(Austria) Tamara Kostic (Spain) Olga Parres Azcoitia; 3–6, 6–4, [10–6]	(United States) Isabella Barrera Aguirre; Vitalia Diatchenko	(Austria) Tamira Paszek (Czech Republic) Linda Klimovičová	(Turkey) Pemra Özgen (Austria) Tamara Kostic (Spain) Olga Parres Azcoitia; Vitalia Diatchenko
July 8	Luján, Argentina; Clay; W15; Singles and doubles draws	(Peru) Lucciana Pérez Alarcón; 7–5 ret.	(Argentina) Luisina Giovannini	(Argentina) Jazmín Ortenzi (Argentina) Justina María González Daniele	(Argentina) Chiara Di Genova (Argentina) Carla Markus (Ecuador) Camila Romero (Peru) Michela Castro Zunino
July 8	Luján, Argentina; Clay; W15; Singles and doubles draws	(Argentina) Jazmín Ortenzi (Peru) Lucciana Pérez Alarcón; 6–4, 7–5	(Peru) Romina Ccuno (Argentina) María Florencia Urrutia	(Argentina) Jazmín Ortenzi (Argentina) Justina María González Daniele	(Argentina) Chiara Di Genova (Argentina) Carla Markus (Ecuador) Camila Romero (Peru) Michela Castro Zunino
July 8	Bissy-Chambéry, France; Hard; W15; Singles and doubles draws	(United Kingdom) Ella McDonald; 6–0, 6–1	Ekaterina Ovcharenko	(France) Caroline Roméo (France) Marine Szostak	(Morocco) Rania Azziz (France) Chloé Noël (France) Ophélie Boullay (Italy) Viola Turini
July 8	Bissy-Chambéry, France; Hard; W15; Singles and doubles draws	Arina Arifullina; Ekaterina Ovcharenko; 6–1, 6–1	(Italy) Viola Turini (Italy) Maria Vittoria Viviani	(France) Caroline Roméo (France) Marine Szostak	(Morocco) Rania Azziz (France) Chloé Noël (France) Ophélie Boullay (Italy) Viola Turini
July 8	Grodzisk Mazowiecki, Poland; Hard; W15; Singles and doubles draws	(Slovakia) Radka Zelníčková; 6–4, 6–2	(United Kingdom) Katherine Barnes	(United States) Ava Hrastar (Slovakia) Katarína Kužmová	(Lithuania) Emilija Tverijonaitė (Poland) Olivia Lincer (Slovakia) Salma Drugdová (Latvia) Sabīne Rutlauka
July 8	Grodzisk Mazowiecki, Poland; Hard; W15; Singles and doubles draws	(Czech Republic) Aneta Laboutková (United Kingdom) Eliz Maloney; 6–1, 3–6, [10–3]	(Germany) Annemarie Lazar (Poland) Aleksandra Zuchańska	(United States) Ava Hrastar (Slovakia) Katarína Kužmová	(Lithuania) Emilija Tverijonaitė (Poland) Olivia Lincer (Slovakia) Salma Drugdová (Latvia) Sabīne Rutlauka
July 8	Kuršumlijska Banja, Serbia; Clay; W15; Singles and doubles draws	(Czech Republic) Darja Viďmanová; 6–1, 7–6^{(7–5)}	(Latvia) Kamilla Bartone	(Serbia) Anja Stanković (Czech Republic) Michaela Bayerlová	(Serbia) Dunja Marić (Slovakia) Katarína Strešnáková (New Zealand) Valentina Ivanov (Serbia) Andrea Obradović
July 8	Kuršumlijska Banja, Serbia; Clay; W15; Singles and doubles draws	(Latvia) Kamilla Bartone (Czech Republic) Darja Viďmanová; 6–4, 6–2	(Greece) Dimitra Pavlou (Serbia) Anja Stanković	(Serbia) Anja Stanković (Czech Republic) Michaela Bayerlová	(Serbia) Dunja Marić (Slovakia) Katarína Strešnáková (New Zealand) Valentina Ivanov (Serbia) Andrea Obradović
July 8	Nakhon Si Thammarat, Thailand; Hard; W15; Singles and doubles draws	(Thailand) Patcharin Cheapchandej; 7–6^{(11–9)}, 6–2	(Australia) Alicia Smith	(Japan) Hikaru Sato (Thailand) Punnin Kovapitukted	(Thailand) Tyra Lithiby (Japan) Rinon Okuwaki (Japan) Ayumi Koshiishi (New Zealand) Monique Barry
July 8	Nakhon Si Thammarat, Thailand; Hard; W15; Singles and doubles draws	(Thailand) Patcharin Cheapchandej (Thailand) Punnin Kovapitukted; 6–3, 6–1	(New Zealand) Monique Barry (Australia) Alicia Smith	(Japan) Hikaru Sato (Thailand) Punnin Kovapitukted	(Thailand) Tyra Lithiby (Japan) Rinon Okuwaki (Japan) Ayumi Koshiishi (New Zealand) Monique Barry
July 8	Monastir, Tunisia; Hard; W15; Singles and doubles draws	(Kosovo) Arlinda Rushiti; 6–4, 2–6, 7–6^{(7–2)}	(Egypt) Lamis Alhussein Abdel Aziz	(France) Alyssa Réguer (United Kingdom) Esther Adeshina	(United States) Sofia Camila Rojas (Germany) Anja Wildgruber (Italy) Cristina Elena Tiglea (Brazil) Luana Plaza
July 8	Monastir, Tunisia; Hard; W15; Singles and doubles draws	(Japan) Nanari Katsumi (Japan) Haine Ogata; 6–3, 1–6, [10–6]	(Egypt) Lamis Alhussein Abdel Aziz (Kosovo) Arlinda Rushiti	(France) Alyssa Réguer (United Kingdom) Esther Adeshina	(United States) Sofia Camila Rojas (Germany) Anja Wildgruber (Italy) Cristina Elena Tiglea (Brazil) Luana Plaza
July 8	Lakewood, United States; Hard; W15; Singles and doubles draws	(United States) Alanis Hamilton; 3–6, 7–6^{(7–3)}, 6–2	(United States) Tori Kinard	(United States) Amelia Honer (United States) Paris Corley	(United States) Alyssa Ahn (United States) Brooke Kwon (United States) India Houghton (United States) Camille Kiss
July 8	Lakewood, United States; Hard; W15; Singles and doubles draws	(United States) Carolyn Ansari (South Africa) Gabriella Broadfoot; 6–7^{(3–7)}, 6–3, [10–3]	(United States) Amelia Honer (India) Teja Tirunelveli	(United States) Amelia Honer (United States) Paris Corley	(United States) Alyssa Ahn (United States) Brooke Kwon (United States) India Houghton (United States) Camille Kiss
July 15	Open Araba en Femenino; Vitoria-Gasteiz, Spain; Hard; W100; Singles – Doubles	(Philippines) Alex Eala; 6–4, 6–4	(Andorra) Victoria Jiménez Kasintseva	(Mexico) María Portillo Ramírez (France) Jessika Ponchet	(Australia) Melisa Ercan (Ukraine) Yuliia Starodubtseva (Czech Republic) Linda Fruhvirtová (Lithuania) Justina Mikulskytė
July 15	Open Araba en Femenino; Vitoria-Gasteiz, Spain; Hard; W100; Singles – Doubles	(France) Estelle Cascino (Philippines) Alex Eala; 6–3, 2–6, [10–4]	(Bulgaria) Lia Karatancheva (Latvia) Diāna Marcinkēviča	(Mexico) María Portillo Ramírez (France) Jessika Ponchet	(Australia) Melisa Ercan (Ukraine) Yuliia Starodubtseva (Czech Republic) Linda Fruhvirtová (Lithuania) Justina Mikulskytė
July 15	Championnats de Granby; Granby, Canada; Hard; W75; Singles – Doubles	(United States) Maria Mateas; 6–3, 7–6^{(7–3)}	(Canada) Kayla Cross	(United States) Ayana Akli (Canada) Stacey Fung	(Chinese Taipei) Liang En-shuo (Canada) Carson Branstine (South Korea) Park So-hyun (United States) Jada Robinson
July 15	Championnats de Granby; Granby, Canada; Hard; W75; Singles – Doubles	(Canada) Ariana Arseneault (Canada) Mia Kupres; 6–4, 2–6, [10–6]	(Chinese Taipei) Liang En-shuo (South Korea) Park So-hyun	(United States) Ayana Akli (Canada) Stacey Fung	(Chinese Taipei) Liang En-shuo (Canada) Carson Branstine (South Korea) Park So-hyun (United States) Jada Robinson
July 15	Porto Open; Porto, Portugal; Hard; W75; Singles – Doubles	(Poland) Maja Chwalińska; 7–5, 6–1	(France) Tessah Andrianjafitrimo	(Czech Republic) Gabriela Knutson (Thailand) Lanlana Tararudee	Evialina Laskevich; Anastasia Zakharova (Australia) Maya Joint (Netherlands) Arianne Hartono
July 15	Porto Open; Porto, Portugal; Hard; W75; Singles – Doubles	(Netherlands) Arianne Hartono (India) Prarthana Thombare; 6–3, 6–4	(United States) Anna Rogers (Ukraine) Kateryna Volodko	(Czech Republic) Gabriela Knutson (Thailand) Lanlana Tararudee	Evialina Laskevich; Anastasia Zakharova (Australia) Maya Joint (Netherlands) Arianne Hartono
July 15	The Women's Hospital Classic; Evansville, United States; Hard; W75; Singles – Doubles	(United States) Sophie Chang; 4–6, 7–6^{(7–5)}, 6–3	(United States) Mary Stoiana	(China) Tian Fangran; Iryna Shymanovich	(United States) Sachia Vickery (United States) Hanna Chang (Japan) Himeno Sakatsume (India) Sahaja Yamalapalli
July 15	The Women's Hospital Classic; Evansville, United States; Hard; W75; Singles – Doubles	(Spain) Alicia Herrero Liñana (Argentina) Melany Krywoj; 6–2, 6–0	(Japan) Hiroko Kuwata (India) Sahaja Yamalapalli	(China) Tian Fangran; Iryna Shymanovich	(United States) Sachia Vickery (United States) Hanna Chang (Japan) Himeno Sakatsume (India) Sahaja Yamalapalli
July 15	Nottingham, United Kingdom; Hard; W50; Singles and doubles draws	(United Kingdom) Heather Watson; 6–3, 6–0	(France) Manon Léonard	(Austria) Tamira Paszek (United Kingdom) Mingge Xu	(United Kingdom) Sarah Beth Grey (Belgium) Clara Vlasselaer (India) Ankita Raina (Japan) Sayaka Ishii
July 15	Nottingham, United Kingdom; Hard; W50; Singles and doubles draws	(United Kingdom) Naiktha Bains (United Kingdom) Amelia Rajecki; 1–6, 6–4, [10–8]	(United Kingdom) Katie Swan (United Kingdom) Mingge Xu	(Austria) Tamira Paszek (United Kingdom) Mingge Xu	(United Kingdom) Sarah Beth Grey (Belgium) Clara Vlasselaer (India) Ankita Raina (Japan) Sayaka Ishii
July 15	Tianjin, China; Hard; W35; Singles and doubles draws	(China) Wei Sijia; 6–7^{(4–7)}, 6–2, 6–3	(United States) Hina Inoue	(China) Li Zongyu (China) Lu Jiajing	(China) Yao Xinxin (China) Shi Han; Polina Iatcenko; Kira Pavlova
July 15	Tianjin, China; Hard; W35; Singles and doubles draws	(China) Huang Yujia (China) Zheng Wushuang; 6–3, 6–3	(Japan) Mana Ayukawa (Japan) Mana Kawamura	(China) Li Zongyu (China) Lu Jiajing	(China) Yao Xinxin (China) Shi Han; Polina Iatcenko; Kira Pavlova
July 15	Darmstadt, Germany; Clay; W35; Singles and doubles draws	(Canada) Victoria Mboko; 6–4, 6–4	(Spain) Ángela Fita Boluda	(Netherlands) Anouk Koevermans (Belgium) Hanne Vandewinkel	(Australia) Jaimee Fourlis (Georgia (country)) Ekaterine Gorgodze (United States) Rasheeda McAdoo (Germany) Mariella Thamm
July 15	Darmstadt, Germany; Clay; W35; Singles and doubles draws	(Australia) Jaimee Fourlis (Australia) Petra Hule; 7–6^{(8–6)}, 6–4	(Czech Republic) Karolína Kubáňová (Greece) Sapfo Sakellaridi	(Netherlands) Anouk Koevermans (Belgium) Hanne Vandewinkel	(Australia) Jaimee Fourlis (Georgia (country)) Ekaterine Gorgodze (United States) Rasheeda McAdoo (Germany) Mariella Thamm
July 15	Turin, Italy; Clay; W35; Singles and doubles draws	(Argentina) Solana Sierra; 4–6, 6–2, 6–0	(Spain) Guiomar Maristany	(France) Yaroslava Bartashevich; Daria Lodikova	(Austria) Julia Grabher (Slovenia) Živa Falkner (Czech Republic) Aneta Kučmová (Belgium) Sofia Costoulas
July 15	Turin, Italy; Clay; W35; Singles and doubles draws	(Slovenia) Živa Falkner (Slovenia) Pia Lovrič; 1–6, 6–2, [12–10]	(Argentina) Julieta Lara Estable (Chile) Fernanda Labraña	(France) Yaroslava Bartashevich; Daria Lodikova	(Austria) Julia Grabher (Slovenia) Živa Falkner (Czech Republic) Aneta Kučmová (Belgium) Sofia Costoulas
July 15	Luján, Argentina; Clay; W15; Singles and doubles draws	(Argentina) Luisina Giovannini; 1–6, 6–2, 6–4	(Peru) Lucciana Pérez Alarcón	(Peru) Romina Ccuno (Colombia) María Herazo González	(Argentina) Chiara Di Genova (Ecuador) Camila Romero (Argentina) Candela Vázquez (Argentina) Luciana Moyano
July 15	Luján, Argentina; Clay; W15; Singles and doubles draws	(Argentina) Luisina Giovannini (Mexico) Marian Gómez Pezuela Cano; 6–0, 6–2	(Peru) Romina Ccuno (Peru) Lucciana Pérez Alarcón	(Peru) Romina Ccuno (Colombia) María Herazo González	(Argentina) Chiara Di Genova (Ecuador) Camila Romero (Argentina) Candela Vázquez (Argentina) Luciana Moyano
July 15	Casablanca, Morocco; Clay; W15; Singles and doubles draws	Ekaterina Kazionova; 6–3, 7–6^{(7–5)}	(Germany) Joëlle Steur	(Australia) Tina Nadine Smith (Spain) Paula Arias Manjón	(Japan) Rinko Matsuda (Lithuania) Klaudija Bubelytė (Kenya) Angella Okutoyi (France) Emma Léné
July 15	Casablanca, Morocco; Clay; W15; Singles and doubles draws	(Kenya) Angella Okutoyi (Republic of Ireland) Celine Simunyu; 6–3, 6–1	(Italy) Gloria Ceschi (Italy) Gaia Squarcialupi	(Australia) Tina Nadine Smith (Spain) Paula Arias Manjón	(Japan) Rinko Matsuda (Lithuania) Klaudija Bubelytė (Kenya) Angella Okutoyi (France) Emma Léné
July 15	Kuršumlijska Banja, Serbia; Clay; W15; Singles and doubles draws	(Czech Republic) Darja Viďmanová; 6–2, 7–5	Kristiana Sidorova	Arina Bulatova (Latvia) Kamilla Bartone	(Slovakia) Nikola Daubnerová (Greece) Dimitra Pavlou (Serbia) Natalija Senić (Serbia) Jana Bojović
July 15	Kuršumlijska Banja, Serbia; Clay; W15; Singles and doubles draws	(Latvia) Kamilla Bartone (Czech Republic) Darja Viďmanová; 6–3, 6–3	(Netherlands) Madelief Hageman (Serbia) Draginja Vuković	Arina Bulatova (Latvia) Kamilla Bartone	(Slovakia) Nikola Daubnerová (Greece) Dimitra Pavlou (Serbia) Natalija Senić (Serbia) Jana Bojović
July 15	Krško, Slovenia; Clay; W15; Singles and doubles draws	(Slovakia) Eszter Méri; 6–3, 7–5	(Germany) Emily Seibold	(Slovakia) Salma Drugdová (Slovakia) Anika Jašková	(Croatia) Iva Primorac (Hungary) Adrienn Nagy (Sweden) Lisa Zaar (Romania) Oana Gavrilă
July 15	Krško, Slovenia; Clay; W15; Singles and doubles draws	(Brazil) Camilla Bossi (Czech Republic) Emma Slavíková; 6–3, 2–6, [12–10]	(Czech Republic) Ivana Šebestová (Czech Republic) Linda Ševčíková	(Slovakia) Salma Drugdová (Slovakia) Anika Jašková	(Croatia) Iva Primorac (Hungary) Adrienn Nagy (Sweden) Lisa Zaar (Romania) Oana Gavrilă
July 15	Nakhon Si Thammarat, Thailand; Hard; W15; Singles and doubles draws	(Japan) Hikaru Sato; 6–4, 6–4	(Japan) Ayumi Koshiishi	(New Zealand) Monique Barry (Thailand) Punnin Kovapitukted	(India) Akanksha Dileep Nitture (Thailand) Salakthip Ounmuang (Japan) Yuno Kitahara (South Korea) Jeong Bo-young
July 15	Nakhon Si Thammarat, Thailand; Hard; W15; Singles and doubles draws	(New Zealand) Monique Barry (Australia) Alicia Smith; 6–4, 6–3	(South Korea) Jeong Bo-young (Thailand) Punnin Kovapitukted	(New Zealand) Monique Barry (Thailand) Punnin Kovapitukted	(India) Akanksha Dileep Nitture (Thailand) Salakthip Ounmuang (Japan) Yuno Kitahara (South Korea) Jeong Bo-young
July 15	Monastir, Tunisia; Hard; W15; Singles and doubles draws	(United States) Sofia Camila Rojas; 6–3, 6–2	(Brazil) Luana Plaza	(France) Hanna Bougouffa (Spain) Victoria Gómez	(France) Giulia Morlet (Italy) Cristina Elena Tiglea (China) Tian Jialin (France) Marie Villet
July 15	Monastir, Tunisia; Hard; W15; Singles and doubles draws	(Japan) Nanari Katsumi (Japan) Haine Ogata; 6–4, 6–2	(Italy) Alice Amendola (Italy) Cristina Elena Tiglea	(France) Hanna Bougouffa (Spain) Victoria Gómez	(France) Giulia Morlet (Italy) Cristina Elena Tiglea (China) Tian Jialin (France) Marie Villet
July 22	Figueira da Foz International Ladies Open; Figueira da Foz, Portugal; Hard; W100; Singles – Doubles	Anastasia Zakharova; 6–2, 6–1	(France) Kristina Mladenovic	(Japan) Aoi Ito (North Macedonia) Lina Gjorcheska	Evialina Laskevich (Thailand) Lanlana Tararudee (Czech Republic) Linda Fruhvirtová (Canada) Rebecca Marino
July 22	Figueira da Foz International Ladies Open; Figueira da Foz, Portugal; Hard; W100; Singles – Doubles	(Japan) Sayaka Ishii (Japan) Naho Sato; 7–6^{(7–1)}, 7–5	(United Kingdom) Madeleine Brooks (United Kingdom) Sarah Beth Grey	(Japan) Aoi Ito (North Macedonia) Lina Gjorcheska	Evialina Laskevich (Thailand) Lanlana Tararudee (Czech Republic) Linda Fruhvirtová (Canada) Rebecca Marino
July 22	Dallas Summer Series; Dallas, United States; Hard (i); W50; Singles and doubles draws	(United States) Clervie Ngounoue; 2–6, 6–3, 7–5	(United States) Robin Anderson	(United States) Kayla Day (United States) Mary Stoiana	(United States) Sophie Chang (Thailand) Mananchaya Sawangkaew (United States) Catherine Harrison (United States) Elvina Kalieva
July 22	Dallas Summer Series; Dallas, United States; Hard (i); W50; Singles and doubles draws	(United States) Usue Maitane Arconada (United States) Katrina Scott; 6–3, 6–3	(Mexico) Jéssica Hinojosa Gómez (Japan) Hiroko Kuwata	(United States) Kayla Day (United States) Mary Stoiana	(United States) Sophie Chang (Thailand) Mananchaya Sawangkaew (United States) Catherine Harrison (United States) Elvina Kalieva
July 22	Naiman, China; Hard; W35; Singles and doubles draws	(China) Li Zongyu; 4–6, 6–2, 6–4	(China) Liu Fangzhou	(Hong Kong) Cody Wong (China) Shi Han	(China) Lu Jiajing (Thailand) Thasaporn Naklo (China) Xun Fangying (China) Zheng Wushuang
July 22	Naiman, China; Hard; W35; Singles and doubles draws	(China) Guo Meiqi (China) Huang Yujia; 6–3, 3–6, [13–11]	(China) Lu Jingjing (China) Ye Qiuyu	(Hong Kong) Cody Wong (China) Shi Han	(China) Lu Jiajing (Thailand) Thasaporn Naklo (China) Xun Fangying (China) Zheng Wushuang
July 22	Horb am Neckar, Germany; Clay; W35; Singles and doubles draws	(Slovenia) Veronika Erjavec; 7–5, 6–0	(Czech Republic) Julie Štruplová	(Germany) Alexandra Vecic (Czech Republic) Aneta Kučmová	Alina Charaeva (Switzerland) Susan Bandecchi (Germany) Katharina Hobgarski (Belgium) Hanne Vandewinkel
July 22	Horb am Neckar, Germany; Clay; W35; Singles and doubles draws	(Czech Republic) Aneta Kučmová (Slovenia) Nika Radišić; 6–4, 6–7^{(3–7)}, [10–2]	Alina Charaeva (Japan) Yuki Naito	(Germany) Alexandra Vecic (Czech Republic) Aneta Kučmová	Alina Charaeva (Switzerland) Susan Bandecchi (Germany) Katharina Hobgarski (Belgium) Hanne Vandewinkel
July 22	President's Cup; Astana, Kazakhstan; Hard; W35; Singles and doubles draws	Tatiana Prozorova; 7–5, 6–7^{(5–7)}, 6–1	Alexandra Shubladze	(South Korea) Back Da-yeon (India) Vaidehi Chaudhari	(Uzbekistan) Nigina Abduraimova (Estonia) Elena Malõgina; Anastasia Kovaleva (Kazakhstan) Sandugash Kenzhibayeva
July 22	President's Cup; Astana, Kazakhstan; Hard; W35; Singles and doubles draws	Anastasia Gasanova; Ekaterina Shalimova; 7–6^{(7–4)}, 2–6, [10–7]	Vitalia Diatchenko (Kazakhstan) Zhanel Rustemova	(South Korea) Back Da-yeon (India) Vaidehi Chaudhari	(Uzbekistan) Nigina Abduraimova (Estonia) Elena Malõgina; Anastasia Kovaleva (Kazakhstan) Sandugash Kenzhibayeva
July 22	Casablanca, Morocco; Clay; W35; Singles and doubles draws	(Spain) Andrea Lázaro García; 7–6^{(7–2)}, 6–3	(Spain) Carlota Martínez Círez	(Spain) Kaitlin Quevedo (Italy) Deborah Chiesa	Ekaterina Kazionova (France) Tiantsoa Sarah Rakotomanga Rajaonah (Germany) Joëlle Steur (Belgium) Sofia Costoulas
July 22	Casablanca, Morocco; Clay; W35; Singles and doubles draws	(Morocco) Malak El Allami (Morocco) Aya El Aouni; 6–2, 6–2	(Switzerland) Chelsea Fontenel (Egypt) Sandra Samir	(Spain) Kaitlin Quevedo (Italy) Deborah Chiesa	Ekaterina Kazionova (France) Tiantsoa Sarah Rakotomanga Rajaonah (Germany) Joëlle Steur (Belgium) Sofia Costoulas
July 22	Open Castilla y León; Segovia, Spain; Hard; W35; Singles and doubles draws	(France) Yasmine Mansouri; 6–2, 6–7^{(5–7)}, 7–5	(Bulgaria) Lia Karatancheva	(France) Nahia Berecoechea (United States) Anna Rogers	(Canada) Cadence Brace (Australia) Melisa Ercan (Spain) Charo Esquiva Bañuls (Japan) Haruka Kaji
July 22	Open Castilla y León; Segovia, Spain; Hard; W35; Singles and doubles draws	(Bulgaria) Lia Karatancheva (Slovakia) Radka Zelníčková; 2–6, 6–3, [10–3]	(Australia) Alexandra Osborne (United States) Anna Rogers	(France) Nahia Berecoechea (United States) Anna Rogers	(Canada) Cadence Brace (Australia) Melisa Ercan (Spain) Charo Esquiva Bañuls (Japan) Haruka Kaji
July 22	Viserba, Italy; Clay; W15; Singles and doubles draws	(Italy) Samira De Stefano; 7–5, 6–3	(Algeria) Inès Ibbou	(Germany) Anne Schäfer (Italy) Vittoria Paganetti	(Italy) Nicole Fossa Huergo (Italy) Enola Chiesa (Italy) Denise Valente (Italy) Francesca Pace
July 22	Viserba, Italy; Clay; W15; Singles and doubles draws	(Italy) Anastasia Bertacchi (Austria) Lilli Tagger; 6–0, 2–6, [10–5]	(Algeria) Inès Ibbou (Italy) Francesca Pace	(Germany) Anne Schäfer (Italy) Vittoria Paganetti	(Italy) Nicole Fossa Huergo (Italy) Enola Chiesa (Italy) Denise Valente (Italy) Francesca Pace
July 22	Sapporo, Japan; Hard; W15; Singles and doubles draws	(South Korea) Lee Eun-hye; 7–5, 6–3	(Japan) Mio Mushika	(Japan) Ayumi Miyamoto (China) Zhang Ying	(Japan) Shiho Tsujioka (Australia) Alana Parnaby (South Korea) Kim Yu-jin (Japan) Shiho Akita
July 22	Sapporo, Japan; Hard; W15; Singles and doubles draws	(Japan) Shiho Akita (South Korea) Choi Ji-hee; 7–6^{(7–5)}, 6–7^{(5–7)}, [10–8]	(Japan) Ayumi Miyamoto (Japan) Anri Nagata	(Japan) Ayumi Miyamoto (China) Zhang Ying	(Japan) Shiho Tsujioka (Australia) Alana Parnaby (South Korea) Kim Yu-jin (Japan) Shiho Akita
July 22	Satu Mare, Romania; Clay; W15; Singles and doubles draws	(Romania) Patricia Maria Țig; 6–1, 7–5	(Romania) Oana Georgeta Simion	(Romania) Lavinia Tănăsie (Switzerland) Marie Mettraux	(Romania) Carmen Andreea Herea (Romania) Elena Ruxandra Bertea (Romania) Bianca Elena Bărbulescu (Romania) Vanessa Popa Teiușanu
July 22	Satu Mare, Romania; Clay; W15; Singles and doubles draws	(Italy) Francesca Dell'Edera (Italy) Giorgia Pinto; 7–6^{(7–2)}, 7–5	(Germany) Laura Böhner (Romania) Lavinia Tănăsie	(Romania) Lavinia Tănăsie (Switzerland) Marie Mettraux	(Romania) Carmen Andreea Herea (Romania) Elena Ruxandra Bertea (Romania) Bianca Elena Bărbulescu (Romania) Vanessa Popa Teiușanu
July 22	Kuršumlijska Banja, Serbia; Clay; W15; Singles and doubles draws	(Latvia) Kamilla Bartone; 6–3, 6–4	(Serbia) Natalija Senić	(Slovakia) Katarína Strešnáková (Netherlands) Sarah van Emst	(Serbia) Draginja Vuković (France) Eleejah Inisan (Italy) Federica Sacco (Netherlands) Isis Louise van den Broek
July 22	Kuršumlijska Banja, Serbia; Clay; W15; Singles and doubles draws	(Netherlands) Annelin Bakker (Netherlands) Sarah van Emst; 6–4, 3–6, [10–4]	(Belgium) Tilwith Di Girolami (Netherlands) Loes Ebeling Koning	(Slovakia) Katarína Strešnáková (Netherlands) Sarah van Emst	(Serbia) Draginja Vuković (France) Eleejah Inisan (Italy) Federica Sacco (Netherlands) Isis Louise van den Broek
July 22	Brežice, Slovenia; Clay; W15; Singles and doubles draws	(Brazil) Gabriela Cé; 6–4, 6–4	(Croatia) Iva Primorac	(Sweden) Lisa Zaar (Czech Republic) Linda Ševčíková	(Slovakia) Laura Svatíková (Czech Republic) Ivana Šebestová (United States) Mia Slama (Germany) Yana Morderger
July 22	Brežice, Slovenia; Clay; W15; Singles and doubles draws	(Slovenia) Kristina Novak (Sweden) Lisa Zaar; 6–2, 6–2	Victoria Borodulina (Czech Republic) Emma Slavíková	(Sweden) Lisa Zaar (Czech Republic) Linda Ševčíková	(Slovakia) Laura Svatíková (Czech Republic) Ivana Šebestová (United States) Mia Slama (Germany) Yana Morderger
July 22	Monastir, Tunisia; Hard; W15; Singles and doubles draws	(France) Ksenia Efremova; 1–6, 6–3, 6–2	(United States) Jenna DeFalco	(Czech Republic) Vendula Valdmannová (United States) Shannon Lam	(Spain) Lucía Llinares Domingo (United States) Solymar Colling (Brazil) Luana Plaza (Spain) Victoria Gómez
July 22	Monastir, Tunisia; Hard; W15; Singles and doubles draws	(Czech Republic) Zdena Šafářová (France) Marie Villet; 6–1, 6–1	(France) Ksenia Efremova (Germany) Sophia Ksandinov	(Czech Republic) Vendula Valdmannová (United States) Shannon Lam	(Spain) Lucía Llinares Domingo (United States) Solymar Colling (Brazil) Luana Plaza (Spain) Victoria Gómez
July 29	ITF World Tennis Tour Gran Canaria; Maspalomas, Spain; Clay; W100; Singles – Doubles	(Spain) Nuria Párrizas Díaz; 6–4, 6–3	(Spain) Andrea Lázaro García	(Spain) Jéssica Bouzas Maneiro (Spain) Marina Bassols Ribera	Polina Kudermetova (Hungary) Fanny Stollár (Germany) Lena Papadakis (Croatia) Lea Bošković
July 29	ITF World Tennis Tour Gran Canaria; Maspalomas, Spain; Clay; W100; Singles – Doubles	(Poland) Katarzyna Piter (Hungary) Fanny Stollár; 6–4, 6–2	(Italy) Angelica Moratelli (United States) Sabrina Santamaria	(Spain) Jéssica Bouzas Maneiro (Spain) Marina Bassols Ribera	Polina Kudermetova (Hungary) Fanny Stollár (Germany) Lena Papadakis (Croatia) Lea Bošković
July 29	Ladies Open Hechingen; Hechingen, Germany; Clay; W75; Singles – Doubles	(Hungary) Anna Bondár; 6–0, 6–2	Ekaterina Makarova	(Germany) Noma Noha Akugue (Czech Republic) Darja Viďmanová	(Belgium) Marie Benoît (Germany) Julia Middendorf (Latvia) Darja Semeņistaja; Marina Melnikova
July 29	Ladies Open Hechingen; Hechingen, Germany; Clay; W75; Singles – Doubles	(Czech Republic) Michaela Bayerlová (Georgia (country)) Sofia Shapatava; 6–2, 5–7, [10–6]	(Germany) Anna Gabric (Germany) Mia Mack	(Germany) Noma Noha Akugue (Czech Republic) Darja Viďmanová	(Belgium) Marie Benoît (Germany) Julia Middendorf (Latvia) Darja Semeņistaja; Marina Melnikova
July 29	Internazionali di Tennis del Friuli Venezia Giulia; Cordenons, Italy; Clay; W75; Singles – Doubles	(Netherlands) Anouk Koevermans; 7–6^{(7–4)}, 6–2	(Croatia) Lucija Ćirić Bagarić	(Netherlands) Eva Vedder (Slovenia) Veronika Erjavec	(Ukraine) Kateryna Baindl (Italy) Aurora Zantedeschi (Italy) Nuria Brancaccio (Czech Republic) Barbora Palicová
July 29	Internazionali di Tennis del Friuli Venezia Giulia; Cordenons, Italy; Clay; W75; Singles – Doubles	(Spain) Yvonne Cavallé Reimers (Italy) Aurora Zantedeschi; 7–5, 2–6, [10–5]	(Italy) Nuria Brancaccio (Spain) Leyre Romero Gormaz	(Netherlands) Eva Vedder (Slovenia) Veronika Erjavec	(Ukraine) Kateryna Baindl (Italy) Aurora Zantedeschi (Italy) Nuria Brancaccio (Czech Republic) Barbora Palicová
July 29	Lexington Challenger; Lexington, United States; Hard; W75; Singles – Doubles	(China) Wei Sijia; 7–5, 6–4	(Thailand) Mananchaya Sawangkaew	(United States) Elizabeth Mandlik (Canada) Rebecca Marino	(United States) Sophie Chang (United States) Katrina Scott; Iryna Shymanovich (United States) Whitney Osuigwe
July 29	Lexington Challenger; Lexington, United States; Hard; W75; Singles – Doubles	(United States) Whitney Osuigwe (United States) Alana Smith; 7–6^{(7–5)}, 6–3	(United States) Carmen Corley (United States) Ivana Corley	(United States) Elizabeth Mandlik (Canada) Rebecca Marino	(United States) Sophie Chang (United States) Katrina Scott; Iryna Shymanovich (United States) Whitney Osuigwe
July 29	Pilar, Argentina; Clay; W35; Singles and doubles draws	(Argentina) Solana Sierra; 2–6, 6–2, 6–1	(Peru) Lucciana Pérez Alarcón	(Argentina) Melany Krywoj (Argentina) Jazmín Ortenzi	(Argentina) Luisina Giovannini (Mexico) Ana Sofía Sánchez (Spain) Alicia Herrero Liñana (France) Alice Tubello
July 29	Pilar, Argentina; Clay; W35; Singles and doubles draws	(Spain) Alicia Herrero Liñana (Argentina) Melany Krywoj; 6–1, 6–3	(Colombia) María Paulina Pérez (Bolivia) Noelia Zeballos	(Argentina) Melany Krywoj (Argentina) Jazmín Ortenzi	(Argentina) Luisina Giovannini (Mexico) Ana Sofía Sánchez (Spain) Alicia Herrero Liñana (France) Alice Tubello
July 29	Køge, Denmark; Clay; W35; Singles and doubles draws	(Ukraine) Oleksandra Oliynykova; 6–7^{(3–7)}, 6–0, 6–3	(Italy) Deborah Chiesa	(Sweden) Jacqueline Cabaj Awad (United States) Vivian Wolff	(Netherlands) Jasmijn Gimbrère (Germany) Tessa Brockmann (Denmark) Vilma Krebs Hyllested (Denmark) Laura Brunkel
July 29	Køge, Denmark; Clay; W35; Singles and doubles draws	(Czech Republic) Denisa Hindová (Czech Republic) Karolína Kubáňová; 6–3, 6–2	(Romania) Oana Gavrilă (United States) Haley Giavara	(Sweden) Jacqueline Cabaj Awad (United States) Vivian Wolff	(Netherlands) Jasmijn Gimbrère (Germany) Tessa Brockmann (Denmark) Vilma Krebs Hyllested (Denmark) Laura Brunkel
July 29	Mohammedia, Morocco; Clay; W35; Singles and doubles draws	Kristina Dmitruk; 6–3, 6–7^{(5–7)}, 6–3	(Turkey) Çağla Büyükakçay	(France) Alice Ramé (France) Emma Léné	(Japan) Ikumi Yamazaki (Slovakia) Nina Vargová (Morocco) Aya El Aouni (Burundi) Sada Nahimana
July 29	Mohammedia, Morocco; Clay; W35; Singles and doubles draws	Ekaterina Kazionova (Republic of Ireland) Celine Simunyu; 6–3, 6–3	(Japan) Funa Kozaki (Japan) Ikumi Yamazaki	(France) Alice Ramé (France) Emma Léné	(Japan) Ikumi Yamazaki (Slovakia) Nina Vargová (Morocco) Aya El Aouni (Burundi) Sada Nahimana
July 29	Roehampton, United Kingdom; Hard; W35; Singles and doubles draws	(United Kingdom) Sonay Kartal; 7–5, 6–1	(Germany) Nastasja Schunk	(Japan) Rina Saigo (Japan) Hikaru Sato	(United Kingdom) Ella McDonald (Australia) Gabriella Da Silva-Fick (France) Diana Martynov (Cyprus) Daria Frayman
July 29	Roehampton, United Kingdom; Hard; W35; Singles and doubles draws	(United Kingdom) Holly Hutchinson (United Kingdom) Ella McDonald; 6–2, 3–6, [10–3]	(Australia) Gabriella Da Silva-Fick (France) Alice Robbe	(Japan) Rina Saigo (Japan) Hikaru Sato	(United Kingdom) Ella McDonald (Australia) Gabriella Da Silva-Fick (France) Diana Martynov (Cyprus) Daria Frayman
July 29	Savitaipale, Finland; Clay; W15; Singles and doubles draws	(Poland) Zuzanna Pawlikowska; 5–7, 6–2, 6–1	(Ukraine) Nadiia Kolb	(Finland) Laura Hietaranta (Norway) Astrid Brune Olsen	(Finland) Aino Alkio (Germany) Franziska Sziedat (Italy) Chiara Girelli (Hungary) Adrienn Nagy
July 29	Savitaipale, Finland; Clay; W15; Singles and doubles draws	(Lithuania) Klaudija Bubelytė (Estonia) Anet Angelika Koskel; 1–6, 6–2, [10–6]	(Italy) Chiara Girelli (Hungary) Adrienn Nagy	(Finland) Laura Hietaranta (Norway) Astrid Brune Olsen	(Finland) Aino Alkio (Germany) Franziska Sziedat (Italy) Chiara Girelli (Hungary) Adrienn Nagy
July 29	Tbilisi, Georgia; Hard; W15; Singles and doubles draws	Daria Egorova; 6–3, 6–1	Rada Zolotareva	Maria Kalyakina (Israel) Mika Buchnik	(Lithuania) Laima Vladson (Japan) Haine Ogata; Edda Mamedova (Georgia (country)) Zoziya Kardava
July 29	Tbilisi, Georgia; Hard; W15; Singles and doubles draws	Daria Egorova; Rada Zolotareva; 3–6, 6–0, [13–11]	Sofya Gapankova; Kseniya Yersh	Maria Kalyakina (Israel) Mika Buchnik	(Lithuania) Laima Vladson (Japan) Haine Ogata; Edda Mamedova (Georgia (country)) Zoziya Kardava
July 29	Sapporo, Japan; Hard; W15; Singles and doubles draws	(Japan) Shiho Akita; 3–6, 7–6^{(7–4)}, 6–1	(South Korea) Lee Eun-hye	(Japan) Kanon Sawashiro (Japan) Kanna Soeda	(Japan) Hayu Kinoshita (Japan) Shiho Tsujioka (Japan) Kayo Nishimura (Japan) Nao Nishino
July 29	Sapporo, Japan; Hard; W15; Singles and doubles draws	(Japan) Mana Ayukawa (Japan) Mao Mushika; 6–3, 6–4	(South Korea) Jeong Bo-young (Hong Kong) Cody Wong	(Japan) Kanon Sawashiro (Japan) Kanna Soeda	(Japan) Hayu Kinoshita (Japan) Shiho Tsujioka (Japan) Kayo Nishimura (Japan) Nao Nishino
July 29	Ust-Kamenogorsk, Kazakhstan; Hard; W15; Singles and doubles draws	Anastasia Gasanova; 6–2, 6–1	(Japan) Ayumi Koshiishi	Ekaterina Shalimova; Ekaterina Ovcharenko	(South Korea) Back Da-yeon (Germany) Sarah-Rebecca Sekulic (India) Vaidehi Chaudhari (Estonia) Elena Malõgina
July 29	Ust-Kamenogorsk, Kazakhstan; Hard; W15; Singles and doubles draws	Aglaya Fedorova; Daria Khomutsianskaya; 7–6^{(7–4)}, 6–2	(South Korea) Back Da-yeon (Japan) Ayumi Koshiishi	Ekaterina Shalimova; Ekaterina Ovcharenko	(South Korea) Back Da-yeon (Germany) Sarah-Rebecca Sekulic (India) Vaidehi Chaudhari (Estonia) Elena Malõgina
July 29	Brașov, Romania; Clay; W15; Singles and doubles draws	(Romania) Patricia Maria Țig; 6–2, 6–2	(Romania) Georgia Crăciun	(Ukraine) Alisa Baranovska (Romania) Ștefani Bojică	(Italy) Matilde Mariani (Romania) Bianca Elena Bărbulescu (Italy) Chiara Fornasieri (Romania) Ilinca Amariei
July 29	Brașov, Romania; Clay; W15; Singles and doubles draws	(Romania) Ștefani Bojică (Romania) Mara Gae; 6–4, 6–0	(Romania) Ilinca Amariei (Czech Republic) Linda Ševčíková	(Ukraine) Alisa Baranovska (Romania) Ștefani Bojică	(Italy) Matilde Mariani (Romania) Bianca Elena Bărbulescu (Italy) Chiara Fornasieri (Romania) Ilinca Amariei
July 29	Kuršumlijska Banja, Serbia; Clay; W15; Singles and doubles draws	(Netherlands) Loes Ebeling Koning; 6–4, 6–4	(Serbia) Anja Stanković	(Bulgaria) Lidia Encheva (Serbia) Natalija Senić	(Poland) Monika Stankiewicz (Serbia) Mila Mašić (Serbia) Lara Stojanovski (Ukraine) Yelyzaveta Kotliar
July 29	Kuršumlijska Banja, Serbia; Clay; W15; Singles and doubles draws	Evgeniya Burdina (Serbia) Draginja Vuković; Walkover	(Netherlands) Rose Marie Nijkamp (Netherlands) Isis Louise van den Broek	(Bulgaria) Lidia Encheva (Serbia) Natalija Senić	(Poland) Monika Stankiewicz (Serbia) Mila Mašić (Serbia) Lara Stojanovski (Ukraine) Yelyzaveta Kotliar
July 29	Rogaška Slatina, Slovenia; Clay; W15; Singles and doubles draws	(Netherlands) Stéphanie Visscher; 6–2, 7–5	(Slovenia) Pia Lovrič	(Croatia) Iva Primorac (Czech Republic) Alena Kovačková	(Italy) Camilla Zanolini (Italy) Greta Greco Lucchina (Czech Republic) Karolína Vlčková (Italy) Barbara Dessolis
July 29	Rogaška Slatina, Slovenia; Clay; W15; Singles and doubles draws	(Netherlands) Joy de Zeeuw (Czech Republic) Alena Kovačková; 4–6, 6–4, [10–7]	(Slovakia) Anika Jašková (Czech Republic) Karolína Vlčková	(Croatia) Iva Primorac (Czech Republic) Alena Kovačková	(Italy) Camilla Zanolini (Italy) Greta Greco Lucchina (Czech Republic) Karolína Vlčková (Italy) Barbara Dessolis
July 29	Monastir, Tunisia; Hard; W15; Singles and doubles draws	(Austria) Arabella Koller; 6–4, 6–4	(France) Marie Villet	(Italy) Lara Pfeifer (United States) Jenna DeFalco	(Belgium) Eliessa Vanlangendonck (France) Marine Szostak (Japan) Hiromi Abe (France) Alyssa Réguer
July 29	Monastir, Tunisia; Hard; W15; Singles and doubles draws	(Japan) Hiromi Abe (Japan) Nanari Katsumi; 6–0, 6–3	(France) Astrid Cirotte (France) Emmanuelle Girard	(Italy) Lara Pfeifer (United States) Jenna DeFalco	(Belgium) Eliessa Vanlangendonck (France) Marine Szostak (Japan) Hiromi Abe (France) Alyssa Réguer

=== August ===
Week of	Tournament	Winner	Runners-up	Semifinalists	Quarterfinalists
August 5	Koser Jewelers Tennis Challenge; Landisville, United States; Hard; W100; Singles – Doubles	(United States) McCartney Kessler; 4–6, 6–2, 6–4	(Australia) Olivia Gadecki	(Netherlands) Arianne Hartono (China) Wei Sijia	(United States) Katrina Scott (Ukraine) Yuliia Starodubtseva (China) Ma Yexin (Philippines) Alex Eala
August 5	Koser Jewelers Tennis Challenge; Landisville, United States; Hard; W100; Singles – Doubles	Doubles competition was cancelled due to ongoing poor weather		(Netherlands) Arianne Hartono (China) Wei Sijia	(United States) Katrina Scott (Ukraine) Yuliia Starodubtseva (China) Ma Yexin (Philippines) Alex Eala
August 5	Zagreb Open; Zagreb, Croatia; Clay; W50; Singles – Doubles	(Italy) Georgia Pedone; 2–6, 6–2, 7–5	Elena Pridankina	(France) Léolia Jeanjean (Italy) Nuria Brancaccio	(Netherlands) Anouk Koevermans (Croatia) Tara Würth (Ukraine) Valeriya Strakhova (Greece) Sapfo Sakellaridi
August 5	Zagreb Open; Zagreb, Croatia; Clay; W50; Singles – Doubles	(Slovenia) Živa Falkner (Hungary) Amarissa Tóth; 6–4, 6–3	(Bulgaria) Lia Karatancheva (Greece) Sapfo Sakellaridi	(France) Léolia Jeanjean (Italy) Nuria Brancaccio	(Netherlands) Anouk Koevermans (Croatia) Tara Würth (Ukraine) Valeriya Strakhova (Greece) Sapfo Sakellaridi
August 5	Bytom, Poland; Clay; W50; Singles and doubles draws	(Spain) Lucía Cortez Llorca; 0–6, 6–4, 7–5	(Serbia) Mia Ristić	(Slovakia) Renáta Jamrichová (Slovenia) Nika Radišić	(Poland) Marcelina Podlińska (Italy) Nicole Fossa Huergo (Poland) Monika Stankiewicz (Poland) Weronika Ewald
August 5	Bytom, Poland; Clay; W50; Singles and doubles draws	(Italy) Nicole Fossa Huergo (Kazakhstan) Zhibek Kulambayeva; 7–6^{(8–6)}, 6–2	(Ukraine) Maryna Kolb (Ukraine) Nadiia Kolb	(Slovakia) Renáta Jamrichová (Slovenia) Nika Radišić	(Poland) Marcelina Podlińska (Italy) Nicole Fossa Huergo (Poland) Monika Stankiewicz (Poland) Weronika Ewald
August 5	Chacabuco, Argentina; Clay; W35; Singles and doubles draws	(Peru) Lucciana Pérez Alarcón; 6–2, 6–4	(France) Alice Tubello	(Brazil) Carolina Alves (Argentina) Luisina Giovannini	(Argentina) Martina Capurro Taborda (France) Tiantsoa Sarah Rakotomanga Rajaonah (Mexico) Ana Sofía Sánchez (Argentina) Jazmín Ortenzi
August 5	Chacabuco, Argentina; Clay; W35; Singles and doubles draws	(Argentina) Luisina Giovannini (Mexico) Marian Gómez Pezuela Cano; Walkover	(Argentina) Jazmín Ortenzi (Peru) Lucciana Pérez Alarcón	(Brazil) Carolina Alves (Argentina) Luisina Giovannini	(Argentina) Martina Capurro Taborda (France) Tiantsoa Sarah Rakotomanga Rajaonah (Mexico) Ana Sofía Sánchez (Argentina) Jazmín Ortenzi
August 5	Koksijde, Belgium; Clay; W35; Singles and doubles draws	(Sweden) Kajsa Rinaldo Persson; 6–4, 4–6, 7–6^{(7–5)}	(France) Jenny Lim	(Greece) Martha Matoula (Netherlands) Lian Tran	(South Africa) Isabella Kruger; Ksenia Laskutova (Japan) Ikumi Yamazaki (United States) Haley Giavara
August 5	Koksijde, Belgium; Clay; W35; Singles and doubles draws	(Belgium) Magali Kempen (Belgium) Lara Salden; 6–4, 6–0	(Germany) Laura Böhner (Japan) Funa Kozaki	(Greece) Martha Matoula (Netherlands) Lian Tran	(South Africa) Isabella Kruger; Ksenia Laskutova (Japan) Ikumi Yamazaki (United States) Haley Giavara
August 5	Leipzig, Germany; Clay; W35; Singles and doubles draws	Alevtina Ibragimova; 6–2, 1–6, 6–2	(Germany) Alexandra Vecic	(Czech Republic) Julie Štruplová (Germany) Katharina Hobgarski	(Germany) Helena Buchwald (United States) Vivian Wolff (Italy) Silvia Ambrosio (Germany) Victoria Pohle
August 5	Leipzig, Germany; Clay; W35; Singles and doubles draws	(Georgia (country)) Ekaterine Gorgodze (Germany) Katharina Hobgarski; 6–2, 3–6, [10–8]	(Czech Republic) Denisa Hindová (Czech Republic) Julie Štruplová	(Czech Republic) Julie Štruplová (Germany) Katharina Hobgarski	(Germany) Helena Buchwald (United States) Vivian Wolff (Italy) Silvia Ambrosio (Germany) Victoria Pohle
August 5	Roehampton, United Kingdom; Hard; W35; Singles and doubles draws	(United Kingdom) Sonay Kartal; 6–3, 6–3	(Japan) Haruka Kaji	(Australia) Gabriella Da Silva-Fick (Japan) Saki Imamura	(Turkey) Ayla Aksu (Japan) Eri Shimizu (United Kingdom) Ella McDonald (Japan) Akiko Omae
August 5	Roehampton, United Kingdom; Hard; W35; Singles and doubles draws	(Uzbekistan) Nigina Abduraimova (Australia) Lizette Cabrera; 6–2, 6–2	(Japan) Akiko Omae (Japan) Eri Shimizu	(Australia) Gabriella Da Silva-Fick (Japan) Saki Imamura	(Turkey) Ayla Aksu (Japan) Eri Shimizu (United Kingdom) Ella McDonald (Japan) Akiko Omae
August 5	Tbilisi, Georgia; Hard; W15; Singles and doubles draws	Ekaterina Yashina; 6–2, 6–4	Maria Sholokhova	Edda Mamedova; Daria Egorova	(Moldova) Eva Zabolotnaia; Elina Nepliy (Denmark) Elena Jamshidhi (New Caledonia) Carolann Delaunay
August 5	Tbilisi, Georgia; Hard; W15; Singles and doubles draws	Sofya Gapankova; Kseniya Yersh; 6–2, 6–3	Maria Sholokhova; Elina Zakharova	Edda Mamedova; Daria Egorova	(Moldova) Eva Zabolotnaia; Elina Nepliy (Denmark) Elena Jamshidhi (New Caledonia) Carolann Delaunay
August 5	Dublin, Ireland; Carpet; W15; Singles and doubles draws	(United Kingdom) Alice Gillan; 6–2, 6–1	(Poland) Aleksandra Zuchańska	(Romania) Karola Patricia Bejenaru (Finland) Ella Haavisto	(France) Chloé Noël (United States) India Houghton (United Kingdom) Megan Davies (Germany) Anja Wildgruber
August 5	Dublin, Ireland; Carpet; W15; Singles and doubles draws	(United States) India Houghton (France) Chloé Noël; 4–6, 6–3, [10–7]	(United Kingdom) Summer Yardley (Poland) Aleksandra Zuchańska	(Romania) Karola Patricia Bejenaru (Finland) Ella Haavisto	(France) Chloé Noël (United States) India Houghton (United Kingdom) Megan Davies (Germany) Anja Wildgruber
August 5	Ust-Kamenogorsk, Kazakhstan; Hard; W15; Singles and doubles draws	Alisa Kummel; 7–6^{(7–1)}, 6–3	(Kazakhstan) Sonja Zhiyenbayeva	Varvara Panshina; Kristiana Sidorova	(South Korea) Back Da-yeon; Ekaterina Shalimova; Aglaya Fedorova; Anastasia Kovaleva
August 5	Ust-Kamenogorsk, Kazakhstan; Hard; W15; Singles and doubles draws	(South Korea) Back Da-yeon; Anastasia Sukhotina; 6–3, 6–1	Varvara Panshina (Uzbekistan) Daria Shubina	Varvara Panshina; Kristiana Sidorova	(South Korea) Back Da-yeon; Ekaterina Shalimova; Aglaya Fedorova; Anastasia Kovaleva
August 5	Bucharest, Romania; Clay; W15; Singles and doubles draws	(Romania) Oana Georgeta Simion; 6–3, 6–4	(Romania) Ștefani Bojică	(Netherlands) Jasmijn Gimbrère (Romania) Ilinca Amariei	(Romania) Patricia Maria Țig (Denmark) Rebecca Munk Mortensen (Romania) Ioana Zvonaru (Turkey) İlay Yörük
August 5	Bucharest, Romania; Clay; W15; Singles and doubles draws	(Romania) Ștefani Bojică (Romania) Mara Gae; 6–7^{(5–7)}, 6–3, [10–0]	(Romania) Ilinca Amariei (Czech Republic) Linda Ševčíková	(Netherlands) Jasmijn Gimbrère (Romania) Ilinca Amariei	(Romania) Patricia Maria Țig (Denmark) Rebecca Munk Mortensen (Romania) Ioana Zvonaru (Turkey) İlay Yörük
August 5	Kuršumlijska Banja, Serbia; Clay; W15; Singles and doubles draws	(Serbia) Natalija Senić; 7–5, 6–2	(Serbia) Anja Stanković	(France) Yaroslava Bartashevich (Bulgaria) Rositsa Dencheva	(Ukraine) Anastasiya Zaparyniuk; Arina Bulatova (Ukraine) Yelyzaveta Kotliar (China) Han Jiangxue
August 5	Kuršumlijska Banja, Serbia; Clay; W15; Singles and doubles draws	(Netherlands) Loes Ebeling Koning (Netherlands) Sarah van Emst; 6–0, 6–4	Ulyana Hrabavets (Bulgaria) Galena Krastenova	(France) Yaroslava Bartashevich (Bulgaria) Rositsa Dencheva	(Ukraine) Anastasiya Zaparyniuk; Arina Bulatova (Ukraine) Yelyzaveta Kotliar (China) Han Jiangxue
August 5	Slovenske Konjice, Slovenia; Clay; W15; Singles and doubles draws	(Slovenia) Pia Lovrič; 6–0, 6–4	(Slovakia) Salma Drugdová	(Czech Republic) Alena Kovačková (Netherlands) Stéphanie Visscher	(Czech Republic) Lucie Petruželová (Liechtenstein) Sylvie Zünd (Italy) Greta Greco Lucchina (Italy) Camilla Gennaro
August 5	Slovenske Konjice, Slovenia; Clay; W15; Singles and doubles draws	(Czech Republic) Alena Kovačková (Czech Republic) Julie Paštiková; 6–2, 6–3	(Slovenia) Petja Drame (Slovenia) Tara Gorinšek	(Czech Republic) Alena Kovačková (Netherlands) Stéphanie Visscher	(Czech Republic) Lucie Petruželová (Liechtenstein) Sylvie Zünd (Italy) Greta Greco Lucchina (Italy) Camilla Gennaro
August 5	Monastir, Tunisia; Hard; W15; Singles and doubles draws	(Belgium) Eliessa Vanlangendonck; 6–2, 6–4	(Japan) Hiromi Abe	(Italy) Lara Pfeifer (Czech Republic) Vendula Valdmannová	(France) Emmanuelle Girard (France) Astrid Cirotte (Slovakia) Tamara Šramková (United Kingdom) Imogen Haddad
August 5	Monastir, Tunisia; Hard; W15; Singles and doubles draws	(Japan) Hiromi Abe (Japan) Nanari Katsumi; 6–2, 6–4	(Greece) Dimitra Pavlou (Slovakia) Alica Rusová	(Italy) Lara Pfeifer (Czech Republic) Vendula Valdmannová	(France) Emmanuelle Girard (France) Astrid Cirotte (Slovakia) Tamara Šramková (United Kingdom) Imogen Haddad
August 12	Cary Tennis Classic; Cary, United States; Hard; W100; Singles – Doubles	(Spain) Nuria Párrizas Díaz; 6–3, 3–6, 7–6^{(7–2)}	(Mexico) Renata Zarazúa	(Spain) Rebeka Masarova (Italy) Lucrezia Stefanini	(Switzerland) Viktorija Golubic (Thailand) Mananchaya Sawangkaew (Netherlands) Arianne Hartono (Philippines) Alex Eala
August 12	Cary Tennis Classic; Cary, United States; Hard; W100; Singles – Doubles	(Switzerland) Céline Naef (Slovenia) Tamara Zidanšek; 4–6, 6–3, [11–9]	(Georgia (country)) Oksana Kalashnikova; Iryna Shymanovich	(Spain) Rebeka Masarova (Italy) Lucrezia Stefanini	(Switzerland) Viktorija Golubic (Thailand) Mananchaya Sawangkaew (Netherlands) Arianne Hartono (Philippines) Alex Eala
August 12	Ladies Open Amstetten; Amstetten, Austria; Clay; W75; Singles – Doubles	Elena Pridankina; 6–0, 6–4	(Ukraine) Valeriya Strakhova	(Turkey) Berfu Cengiz (Germany) Noma Noha Akugue	(Austria) Sinja Kraus; Victoria Kan (Lithuania) Justina Mikulskytė (Netherlands) Eva Vedder
August 12	Ladies Open Amstetten; Amstetten, Austria; Clay; W75; Singles – Doubles	(Spain) Yvonne Cavallé Reimers (Netherlands) Eva Vedder; 6–3, 6–2	(Czech Republic) Jesika Malečková (Czech Republic) Miriam Škoch	(Turkey) Berfu Cengiz (Germany) Noma Noha Akugue	(Austria) Sinja Kraus; Victoria Kan (Lithuania) Justina Mikulskytė (Netherlands) Eva Vedder
August 12	Serbian Tennis Tour; Kuršumlijska Banja, Serbia; Clay; W75; Singles – Doubles	(Serbia) Lola Radivojević; 6–4, 6–2	(Czech Republic) Barbora Palicová	(Spain) Ángela Fita Boluda (Kazakhstan) Zhibek Kulambayeva	(Slovenia) Živa Falkner (Greece) Sapfo Sakellaridi; Tatiana Prozorova (Croatia) Tena Lukas
August 12	Serbian Tennis Tour; Kuršumlijska Banja, Serbia; Clay; W75; Singles – Doubles	(Croatia) Petra Marčinko (Serbia) Lola Radivojević; 7–6^{(7–5)}, 6–4	(Slovenia) Živa Falkner (Croatia) Tara Würth	(Spain) Ángela Fita Boluda (Kazakhstan) Zhibek Kulambayeva	(Slovenia) Živa Falkner (Greece) Sapfo Sakellaridi; Tatiana Prozorova (Croatia) Tena Lukas
August 12	Ourense, Spain; Hard; W50; Singles and doubles draws	Alina Charaeva; 7–6^{(9–7)}, 6–1	(Japan) Haruka Kaji	(India) Ankita Raina (Norway) Malene Helgø	(Switzerland) Valentina Ryser (Austria) Tamira Paszek (Poland) Martyna Kubka (Finland) Anastasia Kulikova
August 12	Ourense, Spain; Hard; W50; Singles and doubles draws	(Poland) Martyna Kubka (Belgium) Lara Salden; 3–6, 6–3, [10–8]	(Portugal) Matilde Jorge (United States) Anna Rogers	(India) Ankita Raina (Norway) Malene Helgø	(Switzerland) Valentina Ryser (Austria) Tamira Paszek (Poland) Martyna Kubka (Finland) Anastasia Kulikova
August 12	Duffel, Belgium; Clay; W35; Singles and doubles draws	(Hungary) Natália Szabanin; 7–6^{(7–3)}, 3–6, 6–0	(Germany) Katharina Hobgarski	(United States) Vivian Wolff (Indonesia) Janice Tjen	(Germany) Antonia Schmidt (Belgium) Magali Kempen (Turkey) Çağla Büyükakçay (Sweden) Kajsa Rinaldo Persson
August 12	Duffel, Belgium; Clay; W35; Singles and doubles draws	(Belgium) Magali Kempen (Belgium) Ema Kovacevic; 6–1, 6–4	(Belgium) Tilwith Di Girolami (Netherlands) Lian Tran	(United States) Vivian Wolff (Indonesia) Janice Tjen	(Germany) Antonia Schmidt (Belgium) Magali Kempen (Turkey) Çağla Büyükakçay (Sweden) Kajsa Rinaldo Persson
August 12	Erwitte, Germany; Clay; W35; Singles and doubles draws	(Spain) Irene Burillo Escorihuela; 6–3, 6–2	(Czech Republic) Julie Štruplová	(Belgium) Clara Vlasselaer (South Korea) Park So-hyun	(Germany) Sonja Zhenikhova (Germany) Fabienne Gettwart (Greece) Eleni Christofi (Germany) Marie Vogt
August 12	Erwitte, Germany; Clay; W35; Singles and doubles draws	(Germany) Fabienne Gettwart (Japan) Erika Sema; 6–4, 6–4	(Slovenia) Kristina Novak (Sweden) Lisa Zaar	(Belgium) Clara Vlasselaer (South Korea) Park So-hyun	(Germany) Sonja Zhenikhova (Germany) Fabienne Gettwart (Greece) Eleni Christofi (Germany) Marie Vogt
August 12	Arequipa, Peru; Clay; W35; Singles and doubles draws	(France) Alice Tubello; 6–3, 6–1	(Argentina) Julieta Lara Estable	(Argentina) Jazmín Ortenzi (Argentina) Carla Markus	(Chile) Fernanda Labraña (Italy) Miriana Tona (France) Tiantsoa Sarah Rakotomanga Rajaonah (United States) Gabriella Price
August 12	Arequipa, Peru; Clay; W35; Singles and doubles draws	(Peru) Dana Guzmán (France) Tiantsoa Sarah Rakotomanga Rajaonah; 3–6, 6–4, [10–6]	(Spain) Alicia Herrero Liñana (United States) Gabriella Price	(Argentina) Jazmín Ortenzi (Argentina) Carla Markus	(Chile) Fernanda Labraña (Italy) Miriana Tona (France) Tiantsoa Sarah Rakotomanga Rajaonah (United States) Gabriella Price
August 12	Bydgoszcz, Poland; Clay; W35; Singles and doubles draws	(Poland) Daria Kuczer; 6–2, 6–0	(France) Julie Belgraver	(Hungary) Adrienn Nagy (Brazil) Gabriela Cé	(Poland) Weronika Ewald (Italy) Nicole Fossa Huergo (Czech Republic) Denisa Hindová (Czech Republic) Aneta Kučmová
August 12	Bydgoszcz, Poland; Clay; W35; Singles and doubles draws	(Burundi) Sada Nahimana (Japan) Rinon Okuwaki; 6–4, 6–1	(Ukraine) Maryna Kolb (Ukraine) Nadiia Kolb	(Hungary) Adrienn Nagy (Brazil) Gabriela Cé	(Poland) Weronika Ewald (Italy) Nicole Fossa Huergo (Czech Republic) Denisa Hindová (Czech Republic) Aneta Kučmová
August 12	Bistrița, Romania; Clay; W35; Singles and doubles draws	(Romania) Patricia Maria Țig; 6–1, 6–1	(Ukraine) Oleksandra Oliynykova	(Romania) Elena Ruxandra Bertea (Georgia (country)) Sofia Shapatava	(Switzerland) Jenny Dürst (Romania) Ilinca Amariei (Romania) Lavinia Tănăsie (Denmark) Johanne Svendsen
August 12	Bistrița, Romania; Clay; W35; Singles and doubles draws	(Romania) Briana Szabó (Romania) Patricia Maria Țig; 6–3, 6–4	(Romania) Ilinca Amariei (Germany) Emily Welker	(Romania) Elena Ruxandra Bertea (Georgia (country)) Sofia Shapatava	(Switzerland) Jenny Dürst (Romania) Ilinca Amariei (Romania) Lavinia Tănăsie (Denmark) Johanne Svendsen
August 12	Aldershot, United Kingdom; Hard; W35; Singles and doubles draws	(United Kingdom) Mingge Xu; 6–4, 6–1	(United States) Haley Giavara	(Japan) Rina Saigo (France) Tessah Andrianjafitrimo	(Australia) Lizette Cabrera (Japan) Naho Sato (United Kingdom) Sarah Beth Grey (Japan) Miho Kuramochi
August 12	Aldershot, United Kingdom; Hard; W35; Singles and doubles draws	(United Kingdom) Naiktha Bains (United Kingdom) Mingge Xu; 6–4, 6–3	(Thailand) Punnin Kovapitukted (Japan) Akiko Omae	(Japan) Rina Saigo (France) Tessah Andrianjafitrimo	(Australia) Lizette Cabrera (Japan) Naho Sato (United Kingdom) Sarah Beth Grey (Japan) Miho Kuramochi
August 12	Xiamen, China; Hard; W15; Singles and doubles draws	(Indonesia) Priska Madelyn Nugroho; 2–6, 6–4, 6–0	(China) Tang Qianhui	(China) Wang Jiaqi (China) Zhang Ziye	(Germany) Sarah-Rebecca Sekulic (China) Yuan Chengyiyi (Japan) Mana Kawamura (China) Zou Ruirui
August 12	Xiamen, China; Hard; W15; Singles and doubles draws	(China) Huang Yujia (China) Zhang Ying; 6–2, 7–5	(China) Lu Jingjing (China) Xun Fangying	(China) Wang Jiaqi (China) Zhang Ziye	(Germany) Sarah-Rebecca Sekulic (China) Yuan Chengyiyi (Japan) Mana Kawamura (China) Zou Ruirui
August 12	Monastir, Tunisia; Hard; W15; Singles and doubles draws	(France) Yasmine Mansouri; 5–7, 6–3, 6–1	(Japan) Hiromi Abe	(Greece) Dimitra Pavlou (Egypt) Lamis Alhussein Abdel Aziz	(Germany) Julia Stusek (Nigeria) Oyinlomo Quadre (France) Astrid Cirotte (Austria) Arabella Koller
August 12	Monastir, Tunisia; Hard; W15; Singles and doubles draws	(Japan) Hiromi Abe (Japan) Haine Ogata; 6–0, 6–4	(Turkey) Leyla Nilüfer Elmas (Greece) Dimitra Pavlou	(Greece) Dimitra Pavlou (Egypt) Lamis Alhussein Abdel Aziz	(Germany) Julia Stusek (Nigeria) Oyinlomo Quadre (France) Astrid Cirotte (Austria) Arabella Koller
August 12	Huntsville, United States; Clay; W15; Singles and doubles draws	(United States) Karina Miller; 6–2, 6–2	(United Kingdom) Kristina Paskauskas	(United States) Carly Briggs (Spain) Mercedes Aristegui	(Norway) Emily Sartz-Lunde (United States) McKenna Schaefbauer (United States) Christasha McNeil (South Africa) Gabriella Broadfoot
August 12	Huntsville, United States; Clay; W15; Singles and doubles draws	(United States) Carly Briggs (Australia) Tenika McGiffin; 6–3, 7–6^{(7–3)}	(United States) Karina Miller (Norway) Emily Sartz-Lunde	(United States) Carly Briggs (Spain) Mercedes Aristegui	(Norway) Emily Sartz-Lunde (United States) McKenna Schaefbauer (United States) Christasha McNeil (South Africa) Gabriella Broadfoot
August 19	Přerov Cup; Přerov, Czech Republic; Clay; W75; Singles – Doubles	(Germany) Noma Noha Akugue; 6–2, 3–6, 6–1	Kristina Dmitruk	(Czech Republic) Aneta Kučmová (Spain) Ángela Fita Boluda	Amina Anshba; Elena Pridankina (Belgium) Hanne Vandewinkel (Spain) Irene Burillo Escorihuela
August 19	Přerov Cup; Přerov, Czech Republic; Clay; W75; Singles – Doubles	Elena Pridankina (Czech Republic) Julie Štruplová; 6–3, 6–4	(Germany) Noma Noha Akugue (Greece) Sapfo Sakellaridi	(Czech Republic) Aneta Kučmová (Spain) Ángela Fita Boluda	Amina Anshba; Elena Pridankina (Belgium) Hanne Vandewinkel (Spain) Irene Burillo Escorihuela
August 19	Arequipa, Peru; Clay; W50; Singles and doubles draws	(France) Tiantsoa Sarah Rakotomanga Rajaonah; 6–4, 6–4	(Argentina) Jazmín Ortenzi	(Peru) Dana Guzmán (Argentina) Julieta Lara Estable	(France) Alice Tubello (Chile) Fernanda Labraña (Brazil) Carolina Alves (Mexico) Ana Sofía Sánchez
August 19	Arequipa, Peru; Clay; W50; Singles and doubles draws	(Argentina) Jazmín Ortenzi (Peru) Lucciana Pérez Alarcón; 5–7, 6–3, [10–1]	(France) Tiantsoa Sarah Rakotomanga Rajaonah (Netherlands) Lian Tran	(Peru) Dana Guzmán (Argentina) Julieta Lara Estable	(France) Alice Tubello (Chile) Fernanda Labraña (Brazil) Carolina Alves (Mexico) Ana Sofía Sánchez
August 19	Saskatoon Challenger; Saskatoon, Canada; Hard; W35; Singles and doubles draws	(Canada) Kayla Cross; 4–6, 6–4, 6–4	(Canada) Mia Kupres	(Canada) Stacey Fung (United States) Jessica Failla	(China) Mi Lan (Canada) Ariana Arseneault (United States) Paris Corley (Slovakia) Martina Okáľová
August 19	Saskatoon Challenger; Saskatoon, Canada; Hard; W35; Singles and doubles draws	(Canada) Ariana Arseneault (Canada) Mia Kupres; 6–4, 6–3	(Japan) Hiroko Kuwata (United States) Maribella Zamarripa	(Canada) Stacey Fung (United States) Jessica Failla	(China) Mi Lan (Canada) Ariana Arseneault (United States) Paris Corley (Slovakia) Martina Okáľová
August 19	Kunshan, China; Hard; W35; Singles and doubles draws	(China) Shi Han; 6–0, 7–5	(Hong Kong) Cody Wong	Kira Pavlova (China) Guo Meiqi	(China) Feng Shuo (China) Li Zongyu (Germany) Sarah-Rebecca Sekulic (China) Zheng Wushuang
August 19	Kunshan, China; Hard; W35; Singles and doubles draws	(Chinese Taipei) Lee Ya-hsin (Hong Kong) Cody Wong; 7–5, 6–4	(Chinese Taipei) Li Yu-yun (China) Yao Xinxin	Kira Pavlova (China) Guo Meiqi	(China) Feng Shuo (China) Li Zongyu (Germany) Sarah-Rebecca Sekulic (China) Zheng Wushuang
August 19	Braunschweig, Germany; Clay; W35; Singles and doubles draws	(Austria) Sinja Kraus; 6–3, 3–6, 6–1	Marina Melnikova	(Italy) Silvia Ambrosio (Germany) Luisa Meyer auf der Heide	(Japan) Erika Sema (Germany) Eva Marie Voracek (Japan) Ikumi Yamazaki (Germany) Eva Bennemann
August 19	Braunschweig, Germany; Clay; W35; Singles and doubles draws	(Japan) Funa Kozaki (Japan) Erika Sema; 6–3, 7–6^{(11–9)}	(France) Sarah Iliev (Japan) Ikumi Yamazaki	(Italy) Silvia Ambrosio (Germany) Luisa Meyer auf der Heide	(Japan) Erika Sema (Germany) Eva Marie Voracek (Japan) Ikumi Yamazaki (Germany) Eva Bennemann
August 19	Cluj-Napoca, Romania; Clay; W35; Singles and doubles draws	(Romania) Georgia Crăciun; 6–1, 6–2	(Spain) Carlota Martínez Círez	(Romania) Ilinca Amariei (Italy) Denise Valente	(Italy) Jessica Pieri (Switzerland) Jenny Dürst (Romania) Ioana Zvonaru (Romania) Patricia Maria Țig
August 19	Cluj-Napoca, Romania; Clay; W35; Singles and doubles draws	(Switzerland) Jenny Dürst (Romania) Oana Gavrilă; 6–1, 6–0	(Romania) Briana Szabó (Romania) Patricia Maria Țig	(Romania) Ilinca Amariei (Italy) Denise Valente	(Italy) Jessica Pieri (Switzerland) Jenny Dürst (Romania) Ioana Zvonaru (Romania) Patricia Maria Țig
August 19	Vrnjačka Banja Open; Vrnjačka Banja, Serbia; Clay; W35; Singles and doubles draws	(Canada) Carson Branstine; 7–6^{(7–5)}, 6–4	(Serbia) Lola Radivojević	(Croatia) Tena Lukas; Tatiana Prozorova	(Spain) Kaitlin Quevedo; Ekaterina Ovcharenko (Serbia) Natalija Senić (Bulgaria) Lidia Encheva
August 19	Vrnjačka Banja Open; Vrnjačka Banja, Serbia; Clay; W35; Singles and doubles draws	(Serbia) Natalija Senić (Serbia) Anja Stanković; 6–3, 6–4	(Slovenia) Ela Nala Milić (Italy) Anna Turati	(Croatia) Tena Lukas; Tatiana Prozorova	(Spain) Kaitlin Quevedo; Ekaterina Ovcharenko (Serbia) Natalija Senić (Bulgaria) Lidia Encheva
August 19	Vigo, Spain; Hard; W35; Singles and doubles draws	(France) Tessah Andrianjafitrimo; 6–4, 6–3	(Japan) Misaki Matsuda	Vitalia Diatchenko (France) Nahia Berecoechea	(Poland) Martyna Kubka (India) Ankita Raina (Australia) Melisa Ercan (Denmark) Olga Helmi
August 19	Vigo, Spain; Hard; W35; Singles and doubles draws	(Japan) Sakura Hosogi (Japan) Misaki Matsuda; 6–0, 3–6, [10–6]	(Spain) Eva Álvarez Sande (United States) Maxine Murphy	Vitalia Diatchenko (France) Nahia Berecoechea	(Poland) Martyna Kubka (India) Ankita Raina (Australia) Melisa Ercan (Denmark) Olga Helmi
August 19	Verbier, Switzerland; Clay; W35; Singles and doubles draws	(Germany) Lara Schmidt; 6–4, 7–5	(Australia) Tina Nadine Smith	(Italy) Deborah Chiesa (Latvia) Diāna Marcinkēviča	(Germany) Katharina Hobgarski (France) Alice Ramé; Victoria Kan (Italy) Federica Di Sarra
August 19	Verbier, Switzerland; Clay; W35; Singles and doubles draws	(United States) Haley Giavara (Latvia) Diāna Marcinkēviča; 2–6, 6–3, [10–7]	(Algeria) Inès Ibbou (Switzerland) Naïma Karamoko	(Italy) Deborah Chiesa (Latvia) Diāna Marcinkēviča	(Germany) Katharina Hobgarski (France) Alice Ramé; Victoria Kan (Italy) Federica Di Sarra
August 19	Wanfercée-Baulet, Belgium; Clay; W15; Singles and doubles draws	(Indonesia) Janice Tjen; 6–2, 6–2	(Luxembourg) Marie Weckerle	(Spain) Cristina Díaz Adrover (Germany) Anna Linn Puls	(Netherlands) Stéphanie Visscher (Belgium) Kaat Coppez (Germany) Gina Marie Dittmann (Belgium) Romane Longueville
August 19	Wanfercée-Baulet, Belgium; Clay; W15; Singles and doubles draws	(Belgium) Kaat Coppez (Belgium) Romane Longueville; 6–4, 7–6^{(7–3)}	(Australia) Ella Simmons (Indonesia) Janice Tjen	(Spain) Cristina Díaz Adrover (Germany) Anna Linn Puls	(Netherlands) Stéphanie Visscher (Belgium) Kaat Coppez (Germany) Gina Marie Dittmann (Belgium) Romane Longueville
August 19	Kraków, Poland; Clay; W15; Singles and doubles draws	(Czech Republic) Linda Ševčíková; 6–3, 2–6, 6–4	(Czech Republic) Karolína Vlčková	(Hungary) Adrienn Nagy (Czech Republic) Ivana Šebestová	(Latvia) Margarita Ignatjeva (Lithuania) Klaudija Bubelytė (Ukraine) Alisa Baranovska (Poland) Valeriia Olianovskaia
August 19	Kraków, Poland; Clay; W15; Singles and doubles draws	(Hungary) Adrienn Nagy (Czech Republic) Linda Ševčíková; 7–6^{(7–2)}, 6–3	(Slovakia) Salma Drugdová (Czech Republic) Ivana Šebestová	(Hungary) Adrienn Nagy (Czech Republic) Ivana Šebestová	(Latvia) Margarita Ignatjeva (Lithuania) Klaudija Bubelytė (Ukraine) Alisa Baranovska (Poland) Valeriia Olianovskaia
August 19	Malmö, Sweden; Clay; W15; Singles and doubles draws	(Finland) Clarissa Blomqvist; 6–2, 6–7^{(1–7)}, 7–6^{(7–3)}	(United States) India Houghton	(Switzerland) Katerina Tsygourova (Sweden) Julita Saner	(Ukraine) Daria Yesypchuk (Denmark) Johanne Svendsen (Lithuania) Patricija Paukštytė (Sweden) Tiana Tian Deng
August 19	Malmö, Sweden; Clay; W15; Singles and doubles draws	(United States) India Houghton (Sweden) Lisa Zaar; 4–6, 6–2, [10–4]	(Denmark) Sarafina Olivia Hansen (Norway) Carina Syrtveit	(Switzerland) Katerina Tsygourova (Sweden) Julita Saner	(Ukraine) Daria Yesypchuk (Denmark) Johanne Svendsen (Lithuania) Patricija Paukštytė (Sweden) Tiana Tian Deng
August 19	Nakhon Si Thammarat, Thailand; Hard; W15; Singles and doubles draws	(Thailand) Patcharin Cheapchandej; 6–3, 6–3	(India) Vaishnavi Adkar	(Japan) Momoko Kobori (Japan) Rina Saigo	(South Korea) Back Da-yeon (South Korea) Jeong Bo-young (Japan) Natsumi Kawaguchi (Japan) Miho Kuramochi
August 19	Nakhon Si Thammarat, Thailand; Hard; W15; Singles and doubles draws	(Japan) Natsumi Kawaguchi (Japan) Momoko Kobori; 6–3, 6–4	(Japan) Honoka Kobayashi (Japan) Yukina Saigo	(Japan) Momoko Kobori (Japan) Rina Saigo	(South Korea) Back Da-yeon (South Korea) Jeong Bo-young (Japan) Natsumi Kawaguchi (Japan) Miho Kuramochi
August 19	Monastir, Tunisia; Hard; W15; Singles and doubles draws	(France) Yasmine Mansouri; 6–3, 6–2	(Italy) Camilla Zanolini	(Brazil) Victória Luiza Barros (Austria) Arabella Koller	Maria Kalyakina (Tunisia) Chiraz Bechri (Austria) Elena Karner (Egypt) Lamis Alhussein Abdel Aziz
August 19	Monastir, Tunisia; Hard; W15; Singles and doubles draws	(Egypt) Mariam Atia (Argentina) Marina Bulbarella; 7–5, 7–5	Polina Kaibekova; Ralina Kalimullina	(Brazil) Victória Luiza Barros (Austria) Arabella Koller	Maria Kalyakina (Tunisia) Chiraz Bechri (Austria) Elena Karner (Egypt) Lamis Alhussein Abdel Aziz
August 26	Jinan Open; Jinan, China; Hard; W50; Singles and doubles draws	(China) Zheng Wushuang; 6–2, 6–2	(China) Yao Xinxin	(China) Shi Han (United States) Hina Inoue	(China) Wang Meiling; Ekaterina Shalimova (Japan) Kyōka Okamura (Chinese Taipei) Liang En-shuo
August 26	Jinan Open; Jinan, China; Hard; W50; Singles and doubles draws	(China) Guo Meiqi (China) Xiao Zhenghua; 6–3, 1–6, [10–5]	(China) Feng Shuo (China) Liu Fangzhou	(China) Shi Han (United States) Hina Inoue	(China) Wang Meiling; Ekaterina Shalimova (Japan) Kyōka Okamura (Chinese Taipei) Liang En-shuo
August 26	Meerbusch, Germany; Clay; W50; Singles and doubles draws	(Austria) Sinja Kraus; 6–4, 6–3	(Serbia) Lola Radivojević	(Cyprus) Raluca Șerban (Turkey) Berfu Cengiz	(Germany) Mona Barthel (Latvia) Kamilla Bartone (United States) Alexis Blokhina (Liechtenstein) Kathinka von Deichmann
August 26	Meerbusch, Germany; Clay; W50; Singles and doubles draws	(Belgium) Magali Kempen (Belgium) Lara Salden; 6–3, 6–0	(Germany) Gina Marie Dittmann (Germany) Vivien Sandberg	(Cyprus) Raluca Șerban (Turkey) Berfu Cengiz	(Germany) Mona Barthel (Latvia) Kamilla Bartone (United States) Alexis Blokhina (Liechtenstein) Kathinka von Deichmann
August 26	Oldenzaal, Netherlands; Clay; W50; Singles and doubles draws	(Belgium) Hanne Vandewinkel; 4–6, 6–2, 7–6^{(7–3)}	Polina Kudermetova	(Lithuania) Justina Mikulskytė (Turkey) İpek Öz	(Germany) Antonia Schmidt (Spain) Cristina Díaz Adrover (Spain) Leyre Romero Gormaz (Netherlands) Anouk Koevermans
August 26	Oldenzaal, Netherlands; Clay; W50; Singles and doubles draws	Polina Kudermetova; Ekaterina Makarova; 6–4, 1–6, [10–7]	(United Kingdom) Freya Christie (Colombia) Yuliana Lizarazo	(Lithuania) Justina Mikulskytė (Turkey) İpek Öz	(Germany) Antonia Schmidt (Spain) Cristina Díaz Adrover (Spain) Leyre Romero Gormaz (Netherlands) Anouk Koevermans
August 26	São Paulo, Brazil; Clay; W35; Singles and doubles draws	(Brazil) Luiza Fullana; 6–0, 2–2 ret.	(Italy) Giorgia Pedone	(Netherlands) Lian Tran (Italy) Aurora Zantedeschi	(Italy) Sofia Rocchetti (Argentina) Jazmín Ortenzi (Bolivia) Noelia Zeballos; Anastasia Zolotareva
August 26	São Paulo, Brazil; Clay; W35; Singles and doubles draws	(United States) Jaeda Daniel; Anastasiia Grechkina; Walkover	(Italy) Giorgia Pedone (Italy) Aurora Zantedeschi	(Netherlands) Lian Tran (Italy) Aurora Zantedeschi	(Italy) Sofia Rocchetti (Argentina) Jazmín Ortenzi (Bolivia) Noelia Zeballos; Anastasia Zolotareva
August 26	Trieste, Italy; Clay; W35; Singles and doubles draws	(Spain) Carlota Martínez Círez; 7–6^{(7–2)}, 6–4	(Italy) Anastasia Abbagnato	(Brazil) Gabriela Cé (Slovenia) Dalila Jakupović	(Czech Republic) Barbora Palicová (Hungary) Amarissa Tóth (Malta) Francesca Curmi (Greece) Martha Matoula
August 26	Trieste, Italy; Clay; W35; Singles and doubles draws	(Italy) Anastasia Abbagnato (Bosnia and Herzegovina) Anita Wagner; 6–3, 4–6, [11–9]	(Slovenia) Živa Falkner (Hungary) Amarissa Tóth	(Brazil) Gabriela Cé (Slovenia) Dalila Jakupović	(Czech Republic) Barbora Palicová (Hungary) Amarissa Tóth (Malta) Francesca Curmi (Greece) Martha Matoula
August 26	Brașov, Romania; Clay; W35; Singles and doubles draws	(Slovakia) Nina Vargová; 6–0, 7–6^{(7–5)}	(Romania) Oana Gavrilă	(Italy) Nicole Fossa Huergo (Romania) Ilinca Amariei	(Romania) Patricia Maria Țig (United Kingdom) Sarah Tatu (Serbia) Jana Bojović (Georgia (country)) Sofia Shapatava
August 26	Brașov, Romania; Clay; W35; Singles and doubles draws	Ksenia Laskutova (Slovakia) Nina Vargová; 6–3, 6–4	(Ukraine) Maryna Kolb (Ukraine) Nadiia Kolb	(Italy) Nicole Fossa Huergo (Romania) Ilinca Amariei	(Romania) Patricia Maria Țig (United Kingdom) Sarah Tatu (Serbia) Jana Bojović (Georgia (country)) Sofia Shapatava
August 26	TCCB Open; Collonge-Bellerive, Switzerland; Clay; W35; Singles and doubles draws	(Turkey) Ayla Aksu; 3–6, 6–1, 6–4	(Burundi) Sada Nahimana	(Australia) Tina Nadine Smith (France) Alice Ramé	(France) Amandine Hesse (Switzerland) Sebastianna Scilipoti (United States) Madison Sieg (Latvia) Diāna Marcinkēviča
August 26	TCCB Open; Collonge-Bellerive, Switzerland; Clay; W35; Singles and doubles draws	(Algeria) Inès Ibbou (Switzerland) Naïma Karamoko; 7–6^{(7–0)}, 6–0	(Switzerland) Karolina Kozakova (Switzerland) Valentina Ryser	(Australia) Tina Nadine Smith (France) Alice Ramé	(France) Amandine Hesse (Switzerland) Sebastianna Scilipoti (United States) Madison Sieg (Latvia) Diāna Marcinkēviča
August 26	Nakhon Si Thammarat, Thailand; Hard; W35; Singles and doubles draws	(Japan) Rina Saigo; 7–5, 2–6, 6–2	(India) Vaidehi Chaudhari	(Thailand) Bunyawi Thamchaiwat (Thailand) Patcharin Cheapchandej	(Japan) Erika Sema (Japan) Naho Sato (Japan) Momoko Kobori (South Korea) Lee Eun-hye
August 26	Nakhon Si Thammarat, Thailand; Hard; W35; Singles and doubles draws	(Japan) Kanako Morisaki (Japan) Hikaru Sato; 6–2, 6–3	(Japan) Natsumi Kawaguchi (Japan) Momoko Kobori	(Thailand) Bunyawi Thamchaiwat (Thailand) Patcharin Cheapchandej	(Japan) Erika Sema (Japan) Naho Sato (Japan) Momoko Kobori (South Korea) Lee Eun-hye
August 26	Bielsko-Biała, Poland; Clay; W15; Singles and doubles draws	(Poland) Daria Kuczer; 6–4, 6–2	(Lithuania) Klaudija Bubelytė	(Ukraine) Alisa Baranovska (Czech Republic) Ivana Šebestová	(Czech Republic) Denise Hrdinková; Polina Leykina (Slovakia) Sofia Milatová (Poland) Valeriia Olianovskaia
August 26	Bielsko-Biała, Poland; Clay; W15; Singles and doubles draws	(Poland) Weronika Ewald (Poland) Daria Kuczer; 7–5, 1–6, [10–6]	(Czech Republic) Karolína Kubáňová (Czech Republic) Aneta Laboutková	(Ukraine) Alisa Baranovska (Czech Republic) Ivana Šebestová	(Czech Republic) Denise Hrdinková; Polina Leykina (Slovakia) Sofia Milatová (Poland) Valeriia Olianovskaia
August 26	Kuršumlijska Banja, Serbia; Clay; W15; Singles and doubles draws	Arina Bulatova; 6–3, 4–6, 7–5	(Switzerland) Katerina Tsygourova	(Poland) Zuzanna Pawlikowska (Serbia) Mirjana Jovanović	(Serbia) Draginja Vuković (Romania) Elena Ruxandra Bertea (Spain) Ana Giraldi Requena; Diana Demidova
August 26	Kuršumlijska Banja, Serbia; Clay; W15; Singles and doubles draws	(Switzerland) Katerina Tsygourova (Serbia) Draginja Vuković; 7–5, 7–6^{(7–2)}	(Montenegro) Tea Nikčević (Poland) Zuzanna Pawlikowska	(Poland) Zuzanna Pawlikowska (Serbia) Mirjana Jovanović	(Serbia) Draginja Vuković (Romania) Elena Ruxandra Bertea (Spain) Ana Giraldi Requena; Diana Demidova
August 26	Valladolid, Spain; Hard; W15; Singles and doubles draws	(Spain) Celia Cerviño Ruiz; 4–6, 6–1, 6–1	(Latvia) Sabīne Rutlauka	Maria Andrienko (Germany) Kathleen Kanev	(Spain) Mercedes Aristegui (Spain) Meritxell Teixidó García (Spain) Claudia Ferrer Pérez (Spain) Carmen López Martínez
August 26	Valladolid, Spain; Hard; W15; Singles and doubles draws	(Germany) Kathleen Kanev (United Kingdom) Eliz Maloney; 6–2, 4–6, [10–4]	(Spain) Celia Cerviño Ruiz (Portugal) Ana Filipa Santos	Maria Andrienko (Germany) Kathleen Kanev	(Spain) Mercedes Aristegui (Spain) Meritxell Teixidó García (Spain) Claudia Ferrer Pérez (Spain) Carmen López Martínez
August 26	Monastir, Tunisia; Hard; W15; Singles and doubles draws	(Spain) Ariana Geerlings; 6–4, 6–1	(Egypt) Lamis Alhussein Abdel Aziz	(India) Zeel Desai (Austria) Arabella Koller	(Italy) Camilla Zanolini (France) Marie Villet (Germany) Anja Wildgruber; Kseniya Yersh
August 26	Monastir, Tunisia; Hard; W15; Singles and doubles draws	Sofya Gapankova; Kseniya Yersh; 6–2, 6–3	(India) Zeel Desai (Republic of Ireland) Celine Simunyu	(India) Zeel Desai (Austria) Arabella Koller	(Italy) Camilla Zanolini (France) Marie Villet (Germany) Anja Wildgruber; Kseniya Yersh

=== September ===
Week of	Tournament	Winner	Runners-up	Semifinalists	Quarterfinalists
September 2	Incheon Open; Incheon, South Korea; Hard; W100; Singles – Doubles	Tatiana Prozorova; 6–3, 6–0	(China) Gao Xinyu	(Thailand) Lanlana Tararudee (Japan) Aoi Ito	(Chinese Taipei) Liang En-shuo (South Korea) Back Da-yeon (United States) Hina Inoue (Japan) Ayumi Koshiishi
September 2	Incheon Open; Incheon, South Korea; Hard; W100; Singles – Doubles	(China) Tang Qianhui (China) Zheng Wushuang; 6–2, 6–3	(China) Feng Shuo (Japan) Aoi Ito	(Thailand) Lanlana Tararudee (Japan) Aoi Ito	(Chinese Taipei) Liang En-shuo (South Korea) Back Da-yeon (United States) Hina Inoue (Japan) Ayumi Koshiishi
September 2	Ladies Open Vienna; Vienna, Austria; Clay; W75; Singles – Doubles	(Croatia) Tena Lukas; 6–4, 6–1	(Bulgaria) Lia Karatancheva	(Italy) Nuria Brancaccio (Croatia) Iva Primorac	(Serbia) Lola Radivojević (Mexico) María Portillo Ramírez (Turkey) Ayla Aksu (Spain) Leyre Romero Gormaz
September 2	Ladies Open Vienna; Vienna, Austria; Clay; W75; Singles – Doubles	(United Kingdom) Emily Appleton (France) Estelle Cascino; 6–4, 7–6^{(7–1)}	(Ukraine) Maryna Kolb (Ukraine) Nadiia Kolb	(Italy) Nuria Brancaccio (Croatia) Iva Primorac	(Serbia) Lola Radivojević (Mexico) María Portillo Ramírez (Turkey) Ayla Aksu (Spain) Leyre Romero Gormaz
September 2	Saint-Palais-sur-Mer, France; Clay; W50; Singles and doubles draws	(Lithuania) Justina Mikulskytė; 7–5, 7–6^{(7–2)}	(Spain) Kaitlin Quevedo	(United Kingdom) Francesca Jones (France) Sara Cakarevic	(France) Alice Robbe (Germany) Carolina Kuhl (France) Diana Martynov (Italy) Jessica Pieri
September 2	Saint-Palais-sur-Mer, France; Clay; W50; Singles and doubles draws	(France) Sarah Iliev (France) Emma Léné; 7–6^{(7–5)}, 6–2	(Lithuania) Justina Mikulskytė (Greece) Sapfo Sakellaridi	(United Kingdom) Francesca Jones (France) Sara Cakarevic	(France) Alice Robbe (Germany) Carolina Kuhl (France) Diana Martynov (Italy) Jessica Pieri
September 2	Slobozia, Romania; Clay; W50; Singles and doubles draws	(Burundi) Sada Nahimana; 6–4, 6–1	(Serbia) Dejana Radanović	(Romania) Georgia Crăciun (Romania) Irina Bara	Ekaterina Makarova (Spain) Ángela Fita Boluda (Cyprus) Raluca Șerban (Spain) Lucía Cortez Llorca
September 2	Slobozia, Romania; Clay; W50; Singles and doubles draws	(Romania) Briana Szabó (Romania) Patricia Maria Țig; 6–4, 7–5	(Romania) Irina Bara (Georgia (country)) Ekaterine Gorgodze	(Romania) Georgia Crăciun (Romania) Irina Bara	Ekaterina Makarova (Spain) Ángela Fita Boluda (Cyprus) Raluca Șerban (Spain) Lucía Cortez Llorca
September 2	Piracicaba, Brazil; Clay; W35; Singles and doubles draws	(Italy) Giorgia Pedone; 6–4, 6–2	(Argentina) Jazmín Ortenzi	(Argentina) Julieta Lara Estable (Italy) Aurora Zantedeschi	(Italy) Sofia Rocchetti (Italy) Diletta Cherubini (Brazil) Carolina Alves (Argentina) Martina Capurro Taborda
September 2	Piracicaba, Brazil; Clay; W35; Singles and doubles draws	(Italy) Miriana Tona (Bolivia) Noelia Zeballos; 5–7, 6–1, [12–10]	(Colombia) María Paulina Pérez (Italy) Aurora Zantedeschi	(Argentina) Julieta Lara Estable (Italy) Aurora Zantedeschi	(Italy) Sofia Rocchetti (Italy) Diletta Cherubini (Brazil) Carolina Alves (Argentina) Martina Capurro Taborda
September 2	Punta Cana, Dominican Republic; Clay; W35; Singles and doubles draws	(Czech Republic) Darja Viďmanová; 3–6, 6–0, 6–4	(Germany) Alexandra Vecic	(India) Sahaja Yamalapalli (Colombia) María Herazo González	(Colombia) Valentina Mediorreal (Spain) Sara Dols (United States) Victoria Osuigwe (United States) Allie Kiick
September 2	Punta Cana, Dominican Republic; Clay; W35; Singles and doubles draws	(Canada) Ariana Arseneault (Canada) Kayla Cross; 6–4, 7–6^{(7–5)}	(Belgium) Margaux Maquet (Spain) María Martínez Vaquero	(India) Sahaja Yamalapalli (Colombia) María Herazo González	(Colombia) Valentina Mediorreal (Spain) Sara Dols (United States) Victoria Osuigwe (United States) Allie Kiick
September 2	Leiria, Portugal; Hard; W35; Singles and doubles draws	(Portugal) Matilde Jorge; 1–6, 6–2, 6–1	(Finland) Anastasia Kulikova	(United Kingdom) Ella McDonald (Canada) Stacey Fung	(Slovakia) Katarína Kužmová (Slovakia) Radka Zelníčková (Cyprus) Daria Frayman (France) Manon Léonard
September 2	Leiria, Portugal; Hard; W35; Singles and doubles draws	(United Kingdom) Sarah Beth Grey (Portugal) Matilde Jorge; 7–6^{(7–1)}, 6–2	(Canada) Bianca Fernandez (Slovakia) Radka Zelníčková	(United Kingdom) Ella McDonald (Canada) Stacey Fung	(Slovakia) Katarína Kužmová (Slovakia) Radka Zelníčková (Cyprus) Daria Frayman (France) Manon Léonard
September 2	Nakhon Si Thammarat, Thailand; Hard; W35; Singles and doubles draws	(Japan) Hikaru Sato; 4–6, 6–3, 6–2	Mariia Tkacheva	(India) Vaidehi Chaudhari (Japan) Rina Saigo	(Japan) Anri Nagata (India) Shrivalli Bhamidipaty (Thailand) Patcharin Cheapchandej (Chinese Taipei) Tsao Chia-yi
September 2	Nakhon Si Thammarat, Thailand; Hard; W35; Singles and doubles draws	(Japan) Kanako Morisaki (Japan) Hikaru Sato; 6–3, 2–6, [10–8]	(India) Shrivalli Bhamidipaty (India) Vaidehi Chaudhari	(India) Vaidehi Chaudhari (Japan) Rina Saigo	(Japan) Anri Nagata (India) Shrivalli Bhamidipaty (Thailand) Patcharin Cheapchandej (Chinese Taipei) Tsao Chia-yi
September 2	Dinard, France; Clay; W15; Singles and doubles draws	(Ukraine) Veronika Podrez; 6–1, 6–1	(France) Mathilde Lollia	(France) Pauline Payet (Germany) Sina Herrmann	(France) Emmanuelle Girard (Canada) Ana Grubor (Belgium) Vicky Van de Peer (Germany) Franziska Sziedat
September 2	Dinard, France; Clay; W15; Singles and doubles draws	(Belgium) Vicky Van de Peer (Germany) Emily Welker; 6–3, 6–1	(Switzerland) Melody Hefti (Germany) Jana Leder	(France) Pauline Payet (Germany) Sina Herrmann	(France) Emmanuelle Girard (Canada) Ana Grubor (Belgium) Vicky Van de Peer (Germany) Franziska Sziedat
September 2	Fiano Romano, Italy; Clay; W15; Singles and doubles draws	(Italy) Verena Meliss; 6–4, 6–7^{(2–7)}, 6–4	(Italy) Samira De Stefano	(Germany) Anne Schäfer (Italy) Alessandra Mazzola	(Italy) Denise Valente (Italy) Federica Sacco (Italy) Camilla Gennaro (Italy) Laura Mair
September 2	Fiano Romano, Italy; Clay; W15; Singles and doubles draws	(Italy) Federica Sacco (Italy) Beatrice Stagno; 7–6^{(7–5)}, 6–7^{(3–7)}, [10–7]	(Italy) Samira De Stefano (Italy) Camilla Gennaro	(Germany) Anne Schäfer (Italy) Alessandra Mazzola	(Italy) Denise Valente (Italy) Federica Sacco (Italy) Camilla Gennaro (Italy) Laura Mair
September 2	Haren, Netherlands; Clay; W15; Singles and doubles draws	(Switzerland) Karolina Kozakova; 7–6^{(9–7)}, 4–6, 7–5	(Germany) Marie Vogt	(Netherlands) Rose Marie Nijkamp (Netherlands) Sarah van Emst	(Germany) Friederike Nolte (Netherlands) Loes Ebeling Koning (Netherlands) Charlotte van Zonneveld; Milana Zhabrailova
September 2	Haren, Netherlands; Clay; W15; Singles and doubles draws	(Netherlands) Rose Marie Nijkamp (Netherlands) Isis Louise van den Broek; 4–6, 7–6^{(7–4)}, [10–6]	(Germany) Laura Böhner (Germany) Mina Hodzic	(Netherlands) Rose Marie Nijkamp (Netherlands) Sarah van Emst	(Germany) Friederike Nolte (Netherlands) Loes Ebeling Koning (Netherlands) Charlotte van Zonneveld; Milana Zhabrailova
September 2	Kuršumlijska Banja, Serbia; Clay; W15; Singles and doubles draws	Arina Bulatova; 6–2, 6–4	(Serbia) Anja Stanković	(Slovakia) Laura Cíleková (Hungary) Luca Udvardy	(Bosnia and Herzegovina) Suana Tucaković (Serbia) Anastasija Cvetković (Serbia) Draginja Vuković (Czech Republic) Michaela Bayerlová
September 2	Kuršumlijska Banja, Serbia; Clay; W15; Singles and doubles draws	(Czech Republic) Michaela Bayerlová (Romania) Ștefania Bojică; 6–2, 6–2	(Poland) Zuzanna Pawlikowska (Switzerland) Katerina Tsygourova	(Slovakia) Laura Cíleková (Hungary) Luca Udvardy	(Bosnia and Herzegovina) Suana Tucaković (Serbia) Anastasija Cvetković (Serbia) Draginja Vuković (Czech Republic) Michaela Bayerlová
September 2	Monastir, Tunisia; Hard; W15; Singles and doubles draws	(Japan) Hiromi Abe; 6–4, 1–6, 6–3	(United States) Eryn Cayetano	(Canada) Dasha Plekhanova; Maria Golovina	(China) Zou Ruirui (India) Zeel Desai (Italy) Camilla Zanolini; Maria Kalyakina
September 2	Monastir, Tunisia; Hard; W15; Singles and doubles draws	(Italy) Matilde Mariani (Republic of Ireland) Celine Simunyu; 6–1, 6–3	Sofya Gapankova; Kseniya Yersh	(Canada) Dasha Plekhanova; Maria Golovina	(China) Zou Ruirui (India) Zeel Desai (Italy) Camilla Zanolini; Maria Kalyakina
September 9	Perth Tennis International; Perth, Australia; Hard; W75; Singles – Doubles	(Australia) Talia Gibson; 6–7^{(5–7)}, 6–1, 6–3	(Australia) Maddison Inglis	(Australia) Lizette Cabrera (Australia) Destanee Aiava	(India) Shrivalli Bhamidipaty (Australia) Petra Hule (Japan) Ayano Shimizu (Japan) Saki Imamura
September 9	Perth Tennis International; Perth, Australia; Hard; W75; Singles – Doubles	(Australia) Talia Gibson (Australia) Maddison Inglis; 6–2, 6–4	(Japan) Erina Hayashi (Japan) Saki Imamura	(Australia) Lizette Cabrera (Australia) Destanee Aiava	(India) Shrivalli Bhamidipaty (Australia) Petra Hule (Japan) Ayano Shimizu (Japan) Saki Imamura
September 9	Le Neubourg Open International; Le Neubourg, France; Hard; W75; Singles – Doubles	(France) Tessah Andrianjafitrimo; 6–2, 6–4	(France) Manon Léonard	(United Kingdom) Amarni Banks (Czech Republic) Linda Klimovičová	(Austria) Tamira Paszek (France) Margaux Rouvroy (France) Harmony Tan (France) Audrey Albié
September 9	Le Neubourg Open International; Le Neubourg, France; Hard; W75; Singles – Doubles	(Israel) Lina Glushko; Anastasia Tikhonova; 6–3, 6–1	Julia Avdeeva; Ekaterina Maklakova	(United Kingdom) Amarni Banks (Czech Republic) Linda Klimovičová	(Austria) Tamira Paszek (France) Margaux Rouvroy (France) Harmony Tan (France) Audrey Albié
September 9	Guiyang, China; Hard; W50; Singles and doubles draws	(United States) Hina Inoue; 7–6^{(7–4)}, 6–4	Alexandra Shubladze	(China) Zhang Ruien (China) Zheng Wushuang	(China) Feng Shuo (China) Liu Fangzhou (China) Wang Meiling (China) Guo Hanyu
September 9	Guiyang, China; Hard; W50; Singles and doubles draws	(China) Feng Shuo (China) Ye Qiuyu; 7–6^{(7–3)}, 6–3	(China) Li Zongyu (China) Shi Han	(China) Zhang Ruien (China) Zheng Wushuang	(China) Feng Shuo (China) Liu Fangzhou (China) Wang Meiling (China) Guo Hanyu
September 9	Leme, Brazil; Clay; W35; Singles and doubles draws	(Italy) Giorgia Pedone; 6–2, 6–4	(Italy) Aurora Zantedeschi	(Brazil) Luiza Fullana (Mexico) Victoria Rodríguez	(Ecuador) Camila Romero (Argentina) Julieta Lara Estable; Daria Lodikova (Argentina) Martina Capurro Taborda
September 9	Leme, Brazil; Clay; W35; Singles and doubles draws	(Italy) Miriana Tona (Bolivia) Noelia Zeballos; 4–6, 6–4, [10–4]	(Brazil) Rebeca Pereira (Ecuador) Camila Romero	(Brazil) Luiza Fullana (Mexico) Victoria Rodríguez	(Ecuador) Camila Romero (Argentina) Julieta Lara Estable; Daria Lodikova (Argentina) Martina Capurro Taborda
September 9	Punta Cana, Dominican Republic; Clay; W35; Singles and doubles draws	(United States) Karina Miller; 7–5, 5–7, 6–1	(Kazakhstan) Zhibek Kulambayeva	(Canada) Kayla Cross (Italy) Lara Pfeifer	(India) Sahaja Yamalapalli (United States) Victoria Osuigwe (Germany) Alexandra Vecic (United States) Hibah Shaikh
September 9	Punta Cana, Dominican Republic; Clay; W35; Singles and doubles draws	(Canada) Ariana Arseneault (Canada) Kayla Cross; 6–1, 5–7, [10–8]	(Kazakhstan) Zhibek Kulambayeva (India) Sahaja Yamalapalli	(Canada) Kayla Cross (Italy) Lara Pfeifer	(India) Sahaja Yamalapalli (United States) Victoria Osuigwe (Germany) Alexandra Vecic (United States) Hibah Shaikh
September 9	Santarém, Portugal; Hard; W35; Singles and doubles draws	(Canada) Stacey Fung; 2–6, 6–3, 6–3	(Belgium) Clara Vlasselaer	(Spain) Andrea Lázaro García (Portugal) Matilde Jorge	(United Kingdom) Sarah Beth Grey (United Kingdom) Ella McDonald (France) Yasmine Mansouri (Switzerland) Tess Sugnaux
September 9	Santarém, Portugal; Hard; W35; Singles and doubles draws	Anastasiia Gureva (Slovakia) Radka Zelníčková; 7–5, 6–1	(United Kingdom) Sarah Beth Grey (Slovakia) Katarína Kužmová	(Spain) Andrea Lázaro García (Portugal) Matilde Jorge	(United Kingdom) Sarah Beth Grey (United Kingdom) Ella McDonald (France) Yasmine Mansouri (Switzerland) Tess Sugnaux
September 9	Reus, Spain; Clay; W35; Singles and doubles draws	(Spain) Carlota Martínez Círez; 6–1, 7–6^{(7–4)}	(France) Alice Ramé	(Netherlands) Eva Vedder (Switzerland) Ylena In-Albon	(Germany) Katharina Hobgarski (Austria) Julia Grabher (United States) Madison Sieg (Germany) Caroline Werner
September 9	Reus, Spain; Clay; W35; Singles and doubles draws	(Switzerland) Ylena In-Albon (Mexico) María Portillo Ramírez; 6–4, 6–3	(Austria) Julia Grabher (Germany) Caroline Werner	(Netherlands) Eva Vedder (Switzerland) Ylena In-Albon	(Germany) Katharina Hobgarski (Austria) Julia Grabher (United States) Madison Sieg (Germany) Caroline Werner
September 9	Dijon, France; Clay; W15; Singles and doubles draws	(Germany) Fabienne Gettwart; 6–4, 6–1	(Ukraine) Veronika Podrez	(France) Astrid Cirotte (Switzerland) Sebastianna Scilipoti	(France) Mathilde Lollia (Switzerland) Paula Cembranos (France) Lucie Nguyen Tan (Germany) Emily Welker
September 9	Dijon, France; Clay; W15; Singles and doubles draws	(Netherlands) Rose Marie Nijkamp (Netherlands) Isis Louise van den Broek; 7–6^{(7–1)}, 6–4	(Germany) Fabienne Gettwart (Germany) Mina Hodzic	(France) Astrid Cirotte (Switzerland) Sebastianna Scilipoti	(France) Mathilde Lollia (Switzerland) Paula Cembranos (France) Lucie Nguyen Tan (Germany) Emily Welker
September 9	Kuršumlijska Banja, Serbia; Clay; W15; Singles and doubles draws	(Serbia) Natalija Senić; 6–4, 6–2	(Hungary) Luca Udvardy	(Romania) Anastasia Safta; Evgeniya Burdina	Arina Bulatova (Germany) Valentina Steiner (Bosnia and Herzegovina) Sara Mikača (Serbia) Petra Konjikušić
September 9	Kuršumlijska Banja, Serbia; Clay; W15; Singles and doubles draws	Doubles competition was cancelled due to ongoing poor weather		(Romania) Anastasia Safta; Evgeniya Burdina	Arina Bulatova (Germany) Valentina Steiner (Bosnia and Herzegovina) Sara Mikača (Serbia) Petra Konjikušić
September 9	Singapore, Singapore; Hard; W15; Singles and doubles draws	Elina Nepliy; 2–6, 7–5, 6–3	(China) Zhang Ying	(India) Rutuja Bhosale (Japan) Yuno Kitahara	(United States) Carol Young Suh Lee (Australia) Belle Thompson (Thailand) Punnin Kovapitukted (South Korea) Choi On-yu
September 9	Singapore, Singapore; Hard; W15; Singles and doubles draws	(Thailand) Punnin Kovapitukted (France) Tiphanie Lemaître; 6–4, 6–1	(Japan) Yui Chikaraishi (Japan) Mei Hasegawa	(India) Rutuja Bhosale (Japan) Yuno Kitahara	(United States) Carol Young Suh Lee (Australia) Belle Thompson (Thailand) Punnin Kovapitukted (South Korea) Choi On-yu
September 9	Monastir, Tunisia; Hard; W15; Singles and doubles draws	(United States) Eryn Cayetano; 7–5, 7–5	Maria Golovina	(Romania) Alessia Popescu (Japan) Hiromi Abe	(Canada) Dasha Plekhanova; Alana Tuayeva (United States) Maribella Zamarripa (China) Zou Ruirui
September 9	Monastir, Tunisia; Hard; W15; Singles and doubles draws	(United States) Eryn Cayetano (United States) Maribella Zamarripa; 6–4, 6–2	(Poland) Xenia Bandurowska (Kazakhstan) Sandugash Kenzhibayeva	(Romania) Alessia Popescu (Japan) Hiromi Abe	(Canada) Dasha Plekhanova; Alana Tuayeva (United States) Maribella Zamarripa (China) Zou Ruirui
September 16	Caldas da Rainha Ladies Open; Caldas da Rainha, Portugal; Hard; W100; Singles – Doubles	Alina Korneeva; 6–1, 6–4	Anastasia Zakharova	(Portugal) Francisca Jorge (Israel) Lina Glushko	(Croatia) Petra Martić (Italy) Camilla Rosatello (Germany) Mona Barthel (Ukraine) Daria Snigur
September 16	Caldas da Rainha Ladies Open; Caldas da Rainha, Portugal; Hard; W100; Singles – Doubles	(United Kingdom) Jodie Burrage; Anastasia Tikhonova; 7–6^{(7–3)}, 6–4	(Portugal) Francisca Jorge (Portugal) Matilde Jorge	(Portugal) Francisca Jorge (Israel) Lina Glushko	(Croatia) Petra Martić (Italy) Camilla Rosatello (Germany) Mona Barthel (Ukraine) Daria Snigur
September 16	Perth Tennis International 2 Perth, Australia; Hard; W75; Singles – Doubles	(Australia) Talia Gibson; 6–2, 6–4	(Japan) Eri Shimizu	(Australia) Maddison Inglis (Australia) Elena Micic	(Australia) Petra Hule (India) Shrivalli Bhamidipaty (India) Ankita Raina (Japan) Misaki Matsuda
September 16	Perth Tennis International 2 Perth, Australia; Hard; W75; Singles – Doubles	(Japan) Sakura Hosogi (Japan) Misaki Matsuda; Walkover	(United Kingdom) Naiktha Bains (India) Ankita Raina	(Australia) Maddison Inglis (Australia) Elena Micic	(Australia) Petra Hule (India) Shrivalli Bhamidipaty (India) Ankita Raina (Japan) Misaki Matsuda
September 16	Pazardzhik Cup; Pazardzhik, Bulgaria; Clay; W75; Singles – Doubles	(Germany) Ella Seidel; 6–1, 6–4	(Germany) Caroline Werner	Alevtina Ibragimova (Spain) Leyre Romero Gormaz	(Ukraine) Katarina Zavatska (Bulgaria) Lia Karatancheva (Andorra) Victoria Jiménez Kasintseva (Romania) Andreea Prisăcariu
September 16	Pazardzhik Cup; Pazardzhik, Bulgaria; Clay; W75; Singles – Doubles	(Slovenia) Veronika Erjavec (Bosnia and Herzegovina) Anita Wagner; 7–5, 3–6, [10–5]	(Bulgaria) Lia Karatancheva (Greece) Sapfo Sakellaridi	Alevtina Ibragimova (Spain) Leyre Romero Gormaz	(Ukraine) Katarina Zavatska (Bulgaria) Lia Karatancheva (Andorra) Victoria Jiménez Kasintseva (Romania) Andreea Prisăcariu
September 16	San Miguel de Tucumán, Argentina; Clay; W50; Singles and doubles draws	(Argentina) Solana Sierra; 6–2, 6–2	(Italy) Giorgia Pedone	(Brazil) Carolina Alves (France) Léolia Jeanjean	(Argentina) Julia Riera (Italy) Sofia Rocchetti (Italy) Aurora Zantedeschi (Italy) Nicole Fossa Huergo
September 16	San Miguel de Tucumán, Argentina; Clay; W50; Singles and doubles draws	(Italy) Nicole Fossa Huergo (Kazakhstan) Zhibek Kulambayeva; 6–3, 4–6, [10–7]	(Colombia) María Paulina Pérez (Italy) Aurora Zantedeschi	(Brazil) Carolina Alves (France) Léolia Jeanjean	(Argentina) Julia Riera (Italy) Sofia Rocchetti (Italy) Aurora Zantedeschi (Italy) Nicole Fossa Huergo
September 16	Fuzhou, China; Hard; W50; Singles and doubles draws	Daria Kudashova; 6–1, 6–1	(China) Guo Hanyu	(China) Zheng Wushuang (China) Yao Xinxin	(China) Wang Jiaqi (China) Yang Yidi (China) Wang Qiang (Chinese Taipei) Yang Ya-yi
September 16	Fuzhou, China; Hard; W50; Singles and doubles draws	(Chinese Taipei) Lee Ya-hsin (Chinese Taipei) Lin Fang-an; 6–3, 6–4	(Chinese Taipei) Cho I-hsuan (Chinese Taipei) Cho Yi-tsen	(China) Zheng Wushuang (China) Yao Xinxin	(China) Wang Jiaqi (China) Yang Yidi (China) Wang Qiang (Chinese Taipei) Yang Ya-yi
September 16	Santa Margherita di Pula, Italy; Clay; W35; Singles and doubles draws	(Czech Republic) Julie Štruplová; 5–7, 7–6^{(7–5)}, 6–2	(Italy) Nuria Brancaccio	(Sweden) Lisa Zaar (Spain) Aliona Bolsova	(Italy) Silvia Ambrosio (Italy) Camilla Gennaro (Spain) Carlota Martínez Círez (Italy) Tatiana Pieri
September 16	Santa Margherita di Pula, Italy; Clay; W35; Singles and doubles draws	(Spain) Aliona Bolsova (Netherlands) Eva Vedder; 6–3, 6–3	(Germany) Katharina Hobgarski (Czech Republic) Julie Štruplová	(Sweden) Lisa Zaar (Spain) Aliona Bolsova	(Italy) Silvia Ambrosio (Italy) Camilla Gennaro (Spain) Carlota Martínez Círez (Italy) Tatiana Pieri
September 16	Kyoto, Japan; Hard (i); W35; Singles and doubles draws	(Japan) Momoko Kobori; 7–6^{(7–1)}, 6–2	(France) Tiphanie Lemaître	(China) Zhang Ying (Chinese Taipei) Tsao Chia-yi	(Japan) Michika Ozeki (Japan) Honoka Kobayashi (Japan) Junri Namigata (Japan) Ikumi Yamazaki
September 16	Kyoto, Japan; Hard (i); W35; Singles and doubles draws	(Japan) Anri Nagata (Japan) Ikumi Yamazaki; 6–4, 7–5	(Japan) Hayu Kinoshita (Japan) Yukina Saigo	(China) Zhang Ying (Chinese Taipei) Tsao Chia-yi	(Japan) Michika Ozeki (Japan) Honoka Kobayashi (Japan) Junri Namigata (Japan) Ikumi Yamazaki
September 16	San Rafael, United States; Hard; W35; Singles and doubles draws	(United States) Robin Anderson; 7–6^{(8–6)}, 6–2	(United States) Ashley Kratzer	(United States) Kayla Day (United States) Sophie Chang	(Canada) Katherine Sebov; Iryna Shymanovich (United States) Lea Ma (Czech Republic) Gabriela Knutson
September 16	San Rafael, United States; Hard; W35; Singles and doubles draws	(United States) Robin Anderson (United States) Alana Smith; 7–5, 6–2	(United States) Makenna Jones (United States) Jamie Loeb	(United States) Kayla Day (United States) Sophie Chang	(Canada) Katherine Sebov; Iryna Shymanovich (United States) Lea Ma (Czech Republic) Gabriela Knutson
September 16	Sharm El Sheikh, Egypt; Hard; W15; Singles and doubles draws	(Georgia (country)) Zoziya Kardava; 2–6, 7–5, 6–2	(Sweden) Jacqueline Cabaj Awad	Varvara Panshina (Egypt) Sandra Samir	(Egypt) Mariam Atia (Egypt) Yasmin Ezzat (Slovakia) Salma Drugdová; Uladzislava Zverava
September 16	Sharm El Sheikh, Egypt; Hard; W15; Singles and doubles draws	(Sweden) Jacqueline Cabaj Awad (Egypt) Sandra Samir; 6–4, 6–0	(Slovakia) Salma Drugdová (Romania) Briana Szabó	Varvara Panshina (Egypt) Sandra Samir	(Egypt) Mariam Atia (Egypt) Yasmin Ezzat (Slovakia) Salma Drugdová; Uladzislava Zverava
September 16	Nogent-sur-Marne, France; Clay; W15; Singles and doubles draws	(Czech Republic) Aneta Kučmová; 6–3, 6–1	(Germany) Mariella Thamm	(Italy) Enola Chiesa (Netherlands) Stéphanie Visscher	(France) Mathilde Ngijol Carré (Spain) Paula Arias Manjón (France) Mathilde Lollia (Ukraine) Veronika Podrez
September 16	Nogent-sur-Marne, France; Clay; W15; Singles and doubles draws	(Italy) Enola Chiesa (Italy) Federica Urgesi; 6–1, 7–6^{(7–3)}	(Germany) Laura Böhner (Germany) Chantal Sauvant	(Italy) Enola Chiesa (Netherlands) Stéphanie Visscher	(France) Mathilde Ngijol Carré (Spain) Paula Arias Manjón (France) Mathilde Lollia (Ukraine) Veronika Podrez
September 16	Kuršumlijska Banja, Serbia; Clay; W15; Singles and doubles draws	Singles and doubles competition was cancelled due to ongoing poor weather			
September 16	Ceuta, Spain; Hard; W15; Singles and doubles draws	(Belgium) Amelie Van Impe; 6–4, 6–2	(Spain) Judith Perelló Saavedra	(Spain) Alba Rey García (United States) Amy Zhu	(Slovakia) Katarína Kužmová (Belgium) Kaat Coppez (Spain) Lucía Llinares Domingo (Israel) Vlada Ekshibarova
September 16	Ceuta, Spain; Hard; W15; Singles and doubles draws	(Belgium) Kaat Coppez (Belgium) Amelie Van Impe; 3–2 ret.	(Spain) Judith Perelló Saavedra (Spain) Alba Rey García	(Spain) Alba Rey García (United States) Amy Zhu	(Slovakia) Katarína Kužmová (Belgium) Kaat Coppez (Spain) Lucía Llinares Domingo (Israel) Vlada Ekshibarova
September 16	Monastir, Tunisia; Hard; W15; Singles and doubles draws	(Belgium) Eliessa Vanlangendonck; 6–3, 6–1	(Venezuela) Sofía Elena Cabezas Domínguez	(Canada) Dasha Plekhanova (Poland) Anna Hertel	(Italy) Viola Turini (Italy) Angelica Raggi (Italy) Camilla Zanolini (France) Alyssa Réguer
September 16	Monastir, Tunisia; Hard; W15; Singles and doubles draws	(Germany) Luisa Hrda (Italy) Viola Turini; 6–0, 7–6^{(7–3)}	(Italy) Angelica Raggi (China) Tian Niehua	(Canada) Dasha Plekhanova (Poland) Anna Hertel	(Italy) Viola Turini (Italy) Angelica Raggi (Italy) Camilla Zanolini (France) Alyssa Réguer
September 23	Lisboa Belém Open; Lisbon, Portugal; Clay; W75; Singles – Doubles	(Andorra) Victoria Jiménez Kasintseva; 6–4, 6–2	(Spain) Guiomar Maristany	(Switzerland) Ylena In-Albon (Spain) Ángela Fita Boluda	(Netherlands) Arantxa Rus (Switzerland) Simona Waltert (France) Carole Monnet (United Kingdom) Francesca Jones
September 23	Lisboa Belém Open; Lisbon, Portugal; Clay; W75; Singles – Doubles	(Portugal) Francisca Jorge (Portugal) Matilde Jorge; 7–6^{(7–5)}, 6–4	(Spain) Yvonne Cavallé Reimers (Spain) Ángela Fita Boluda	(Switzerland) Ylena In-Albon (Spain) Ángela Fita Boluda	(Netherlands) Arantxa Rus (Switzerland) Simona Waltert (France) Carole Monnet (United Kingdom) Francesca Jones
September 23	Serbian Tennis Tour; Kuršumlijska Banja, Serbia; Clay; W75; Singles – Doubles	(Serbia) Lola Radivojević; 6–2, 7–6^{(9–7)}	(Cyprus) Raluca Șerban	(North Macedonia) Lina Gjorcheska (Romania) Patricia Maria Țig	(Slovenia) Dalila Jakupović (Serbia) Nina Stojanović (Croatia) Tena Lukas (Turkey) Berfu Cengiz
September 23	Serbian Tennis Tour; Kuršumlijska Banja, Serbia; Clay; W75; Singles – Doubles	Amina Anshba (Germany) Noma Noha Akugue; 6–2, 7–6^{(7–2)}	(Romania) Cristina Dinu (Bulgaria) Lia Karatancheva	(North Macedonia) Lina Gjorcheska (Romania) Patricia Maria Țig	(Slovenia) Dalila Jakupović (Serbia) Nina Stojanović (Croatia) Tena Lukas (Turkey) Berfu Cengiz
September 23	Central Coast Pro Tennis Open; Templeton, United States; Hard; W75; Singles – Doubles	(Mexico) Renata Zarazúa; 6–4, 6–3	(United States) Usue Maitane Arconada	(Canada) Cadence Brace (United States) Katrina Scott	Irina Shymanovich (Japan) Himeno Sakatsume (United States) Elizabeth Mandlik (Canada) Rebecca Marino
September 23	Central Coast Pro Tennis Open; Templeton, United States; Hard; W75; Singles – Doubles	(United States) Sophie Chang (United States) Rasheeda McAdoo; 1–6, 6–2, [10–4]	(United States) Carmen Corley (Canada) Rebecca Marino	(Canada) Cadence Brace (United States) Katrina Scott	Irina Shymanovich (Japan) Himeno Sakatsume (United States) Elizabeth Mandlik (Canada) Rebecca Marino
September 23	Pilar, Argentina; Clay; W50; Singles and doubles draws	(Argentina) Solana Sierra; 6–2 ret.	(France) Léolia Jeanjean	(Spain) Irene Burillo Escorihuela (Mexico) Ana Sofía Sánchez	(Kazakhstan) Zhibek Kulambayeva (Italy) Giorgia Pedone (Ukraine) Valeriya Strakhova (Italy) Nicole Fossa Huergo
September 23	Pilar, Argentina; Clay; W50; Singles and doubles draws	(Brazil) Carolina Alves (Argentina) Julia Riera; 6–4, 7–5	(Italy) Nicole Fossa Huergo (Kazakhstan) Zhibek Kulambayeva	(Spain) Irene Burillo Escorihuela (Mexico) Ana Sofía Sánchez	(Kazakhstan) Zhibek Kulambayeva (Italy) Giorgia Pedone (Ukraine) Valeriya Strakhova (Italy) Nicole Fossa Huergo
September 23	Nanao, Japan; Carpet; W50; Singles and doubles draws	(Japan) Aoi Ito; 6–2, 6–1	(Japan) Ayano Shimizu	(Japan) Kyōka Okamura (Japan) Rinon Okuwaki	(Japan) Mei Yamaguchi (Japan) Haruna Arakawa (Japan) Momoko Kobori (Japan) Haruka Kaji
September 23	Nanao, Japan; Carpet; W50; Singles and doubles draws	(Japan) Aoi Ito (Japan) Naho Sato; 6–1, 6–3	(Japan) Momoko Kobori (Japan) Ayano Shimizu	(Japan) Kyōka Okamura (Japan) Rinon Okuwaki	(Japan) Mei Yamaguchi (Japan) Haruna Arakawa (Japan) Momoko Kobori (Japan) Haruka Kaji
September 23	Santa Margherita di Pula, Italy; Clay; W35; Singles and doubles draws	(Austria) Julia Grabher; 3–6, 6–0, 6–2	(Switzerland) Leonie Küng	(Italy) Silvia Ambrosio (Czech Republic) Julie Štruplová	(Belgium) Hanne Vandewinkel (Italy) Camilla Gennaro (Italy) Anastasia Abbagnato (Poland) Daria Kuczer
September 23	Santa Margherita di Pula, Italy; Clay; W35; Singles and doubles draws	(Poland) Daria Kuczer (Sweden) Lisa Zaar; Walkover	(Italy) Silvia Ambrosio (Czech Republic) Julie Štruplová	(Italy) Silvia Ambrosio (Czech Republic) Julie Štruplová	(Belgium) Hanne Vandewinkel (Italy) Camilla Gennaro (Italy) Anastasia Abbagnato (Poland) Daria Kuczer
September 23	Berkeley Tennis Club Challenge; Berkeley, United States; Hard; W35; Singles and doubles draws	(United States) Iva Jovic; 6–3, 2–6, 6–3	(Canada) Victoria Mboko	(Australia) Jaimee Fourlis (United States) Whitney Osuigwe	(Slovakia) Viktória Hrunčáková (United States) Alana Smith (United States) Jamie Loeb (United States) Clervie Ngounoue
September 23	Berkeley Tennis Club Challenge; Berkeley, United States; Hard; W35; Singles and doubles draws	(Australia) Elysia Bolton (United States) Maegan Manasse; 6–7^{(3–7)}, 6–2, [10–6]	(India) Rutuja Bhosale (United States) Ema Burgić	(Australia) Jaimee Fourlis (United States) Whitney Osuigwe	(Slovakia) Viktória Hrunčáková (United States) Alana Smith (United States) Jamie Loeb (United States) Clervie Ngounoue
September 23	Varna, Bulgaria; Clay; W15; Singles and doubles draws	(Romania) Georgia Crăciun; 7–5, 6–0	(Ukraine) Yelyzaveta Kotliar	(Romania) Elena Ruxandra Bertea (Czech Republic) Magdaléna Smékalová	(Ukraine) Alisa Baranovska (Italy) Chiara Girelli (Australia) Shanelle Iaconi (Bulgaria) Yoana Konstantinova
September 23	Varna, Bulgaria; Clay; W15; Singles and doubles draws	Maria Andrienko (Belgium) Tilwith Di Girolami; 5–7, 6–1, [10–3]	(Italy) Chiara Girelli (Italy) Irene Lavino	(Romania) Elena Ruxandra Bertea (Czech Republic) Magdaléna Smékalová	(Ukraine) Alisa Baranovska (Italy) Chiara Girelli (Australia) Shanelle Iaconi (Bulgaria) Yoana Konstantinova
September 23	Sharm El Sheikh, Egypt; Hard; W15; Singles and doubles draws	(Egypt) Lamis Alhussein Abdel Aziz; 6–3, 6–3	(Egypt) Sandra Samir	(Chinese Taipei) Joanna Garland (Sweden) Jacqueline Cabaj Awad	(Slovakia) Salma Drugdová (Georgia (country)) Zoziya Kardava (Romania) Briana Szabó (Italy) Noemi Maines
September 23	Sharm El Sheikh, Egypt; Hard; W15; Singles and doubles draws	(Turkey) Defne Çırpanlı (Egypt) Yasmin Ezzat; 2–6, 6–3, [10–7]	(Serbia) Darja Suvirđonkova; Daria Zelinskaya	(Chinese Taipei) Joanna Garland (Sweden) Jacqueline Cabaj Awad	(Slovakia) Salma Drugdová (Georgia (country)) Zoziya Kardava (Romania) Briana Szabó (Italy) Noemi Maines
September 23	Yeongwol, South Korea; Hard; W15; Singles and doubles draws	(South Korea) Back Da-yeon; 6–2, 6–1	(South Korea) Lee Eun-hye	(China) Zhang Ying (Hong Kong) Cody Wong	(South Korea) Jeong Bo-young (Japan) Chihiro Muramatsu (South Korea) Choi Seo-yun (Chinese Taipei) Lin Fang-an
September 23	Yeongwol, South Korea; Hard; W15; Singles and doubles draws	(Chinese Taipei) Lee Ya-hsin (Chinese Taipei) Lin Fang-an; 6–4, 6–7^{(6–8)}, [10–6]	(South Korea) Jeong Su-nam (China) Ye Qiuyu	(China) Zhang Ying (Hong Kong) Cody Wong	(South Korea) Jeong Bo-young (Japan) Chihiro Muramatsu (South Korea) Choi Seo-yun (Chinese Taipei) Lin Fang-an
September 23	Trnava, Slovakia; Hard (i); W15; Singles and doubles draws	(Slovakia) Katarína Kužmová; 6–4, 3–6, 6–3	(Slovakia) Radka Zelníčková	(Slovakia) Sofia Milatová; Milana Zhabrailova	(Czech Republic) Aneta Laboutková (Slovakia) Laura Cíleková (Germany) Amelie Justine Hejtmanek (Germany) Mara Guth
September 23	Trnava, Slovakia; Hard (i); W15; Singles and doubles draws	(Slovakia) Katarína Kužmová (Slovakia) Nina Vargová; 7–5, 4–6, [10–6]	(Czech Republic) Ivana Šebestová (Slovakia) Radka Zelníčková	(Slovakia) Sofia Milatová; Milana Zhabrailova	(Czech Republic) Aneta Laboutková (Slovakia) Laura Cíleková (Germany) Amelie Justine Hejtmanek (Germany) Mara Guth
September 23	Madrid, Spain; Hard; W15; Singles and doubles draws	(Kazakhstan) Sonja Zhiyenbayeva; 6–1, 5–7, 6–1	(United Kingdom) Alice Gillan	(Switzerland) Jenny Dürst (Spain) Alba Rey García	(Switzerland) Tess Sugnaux (United States) Amy Zhu (Spain) Lucía Llinares Domingo (South Korea) Ku Yeon-woo
September 23	Madrid, Spain; Hard; W15; Singles and doubles draws	(Switzerland) Jenny Dürst (Republic of Ireland) Celine Simunyu; 6–4, 6–4	(Uzbekistan) Vlada Ekshibarova (United Kingdom) Emma Wilson	(Switzerland) Jenny Dürst (Spain) Alba Rey García	(Switzerland) Tess Sugnaux (United States) Amy Zhu (Spain) Lucía Llinares Domingo (South Korea) Ku Yeon-woo
September 23	Monastir, Tunisia; Hard; W15; Singles and doubles draws	(Italy) Camilla Zanolini; 6–2, 6–1	(Venezuela) Sofía Elena Cabezas Domínguez	(Denmark) Laura Brunkel (Austria) Arabella Koller	(China) Zou Ruirui (Cyprus) Daria Frayman (Germany) Gina Marie Dittmann (Belgium) Eliessa Vanlangendonck
September 23	Monastir, Tunisia; Hard; W15; Singles and doubles draws	(Cyprus) Daria Frayman (United Kingdom) Lauryn John-Baptiste; 7–6^{(9–7)}, 6–4	(France) Nina Radovanovic (France) Marie Villet	(Denmark) Laura Brunkel (Austria) Arabella Koller	(China) Zou Ruirui (Cyprus) Daria Frayman (Germany) Gina Marie Dittmann (Belgium) Eliessa Vanlangendonck
September 30	São Paulo Torneio Internacional de Tênis Feminino; São Paulo, Brazil; Clay; W75; Singles – Doubles	(Brazil) Laura Pigossi; 6–7^{(3–7)}, 6–3, 6–3	(Italy) Beatrice Ricci	(Argentina) Julia Riera; Daria Lodikova	(Italy) Diletta Cherubini (Italy) Nicole Fossa Huergo (Italy) Giorgia Pedone (Spain) Irene Burillo Escorihuela
September 30	São Paulo Torneio Internacional de Tênis Feminino; São Paulo, Brazil; Clay; W75; Singles – Doubles	(Italy) Nicole Fossa Huergo (Kazakhstan) Zhibek Kulambayeva; 3–6, 6–2, [10–4]	(Greece) Eleni Christofi (Italy) Aurora Zantedeschi	(Argentina) Julia Riera; Daria Lodikova	(Italy) Diletta Cherubini (Italy) Nicole Fossa Huergo (Italy) Giorgia Pedone (Spain) Irene Burillo Escorihuela
September 30	Šibenik Open; Šibenik, Croatia; Clay; W75; Singles – Doubles	(Czech Republic) Sára Bejlek; 6–2, 6–0	(Latvia) Darja Semeņistaja	(Turkey) İpek Öz (Liechtenstein) Kathinka von Deichmann	(Slovenia) Veronika Erjavec (Germany) Stephanie Wagner (Italy) Nuria Brancaccio (Slovenia) Živa Falkner
September 30	Šibenik Open; Šibenik, Croatia; Clay; W75; Singles – Doubles	(Slovenia) Živa Falkner (Hungary) Amarissa Tóth; 2–1 ret.	(Cyprus) Raluca Șerban (Romania) Anca Todoni	(Turkey) İpek Öz (Liechtenstein) Kathinka von Deichmann	(Slovenia) Veronika Erjavec (Germany) Stephanie Wagner (Italy) Nuria Brancaccio (Slovenia) Živa Falkner
September 30	Rancho Santa Fe Open; Rancho Santa Fe, United States; Hard; W75; Singles – Doubles	(United States) Iva Jovic; 6–3, 6–3	(Japan) Ena Shibahara	(Canada) Katherine Sebov (Thailand) Lanlana Tararudee	(Australia) Maya Joint (United States) Lauren Davis (Czech Republic) Gabriela Knutson (Canada) Rebecca Marino
September 30	Rancho Santa Fe Open; Rancho Santa Fe, United States; Hard; W75; Singles – Doubles	Maria Kononova; Maria Kozyreva; 6–2, 7–6^{(7–4)}	(United States) Haley Giavara (United States) Rasheeda McAdoo	(Canada) Katherine Sebov (Thailand) Lanlana Tararudee	(Australia) Maya Joint (United States) Lauren Davis (Czech Republic) Gabriela Knutson (Canada) Rebecca Marino
September 30	Cairns, Australia; Hard; W35; Singles and doubles draws	(Australia) Talia Gibson; 6–2, 7–6^{(7–2)}	(Australia) Lizette Cabrera	(New Zealand) Monique Barry (Australia) Maddison Inglis	(Australia) Petra Hule (Australia) Alana Parnaby (Japan) Kyōka Okamura (Australia) Elena Micic
September 30	Cairns, Australia; Hard; W35; Singles and doubles draws	(Australia) Petra Hule (Australia) Alana Parnaby; 6–2, 6–2	(United States) Mia Horvit (Australia) Tenika McGiffin	(New Zealand) Monique Barry (Australia) Maddison Inglis	(Australia) Petra Hule (Australia) Alana Parnaby (Japan) Kyōka Okamura (Australia) Elena Micic
September 30	Reims, France; Hard (i); W35; Singles and doubles draws	Julia Avdeeva; 3–6, 6–3, 6–4	(France) Margaux Rouvroy	(Finland) Anastasia Kulikova (Switzerland) Céline Naef	(France) Alice Tubello (United Kingdom) Amarni Banks (Turkey) Ayla Aksu (France) Manon Léonard
September 30	Reims, France; Hard (i); W35; Singles and doubles draws	(United Kingdom) Sarah Beth Grey (United Kingdom) Mingge Xu; 6–3, 6–1	Ekaterina Ovcharenko (United Kingdom) Emily Webley-Smith	(Finland) Anastasia Kulikova (Switzerland) Céline Naef	(France) Alice Tubello (United Kingdom) Amarni Banks (Turkey) Ayla Aksu (France) Manon Léonard
September 30	Santa Margherita di Pula, Italy; Clay; W35; Singles and doubles draws	(France) Sara Cakarevic; 6–2, 7–6^{(10–8)}	(Italy) Matilde Paoletti	(Czech Republic) Tereza Valentová (Spain) Carlota Martínez Círez	(Austria) Lilli Tagger (Australia) Tina Nadine Smith (Italy) Federica Urgesi (Greece) Sapfo Sakellaridi
September 30	Santa Margherita di Pula, Italy; Clay; W35; Singles and doubles draws	(Greece) Sapfo Sakellaridi (Romania) Arina Vasilescu; 6–2, 6–2	(Italy) Noemi Basiletti (Italy) Vittoria Paganetti	(Czech Republic) Tereza Valentová (Spain) Carlota Martínez Círez	(Austria) Lilli Tagger (Australia) Tina Nadine Smith (Italy) Federica Urgesi (Greece) Sapfo Sakellaridi
September 30	Baza, Spain; Hard; W35; Singles and doubles draws	(Switzerland) Susan Bandecchi; 6–3, 6–3	(Spain) Ariana Geerlings	(United States) Amy Zhu; Alina Charaeva	(Lithuania) Justina Mikulskytė (South Korea) Ku Yeon-woo (Spain) Kaitlin Quevedo (France) Amandine Hesse
September 30	Baza, Spain; Hard; W35; Singles and doubles draws	(Germany) Tayisiya Morderger (Germany) Yana Morderger; 6–3, 7–6^{(7–1)}	(France) Nahia Berecoechea; Alina Charaeva	(United States) Amy Zhu; Alina Charaeva	(Lithuania) Justina Mikulskytė (South Korea) Ku Yeon-woo (Spain) Kaitlin Quevedo (France) Amandine Hesse
September 30	Redding, United States; Hard; W35; Singles and doubles draws	(United States) Lea Ma; 6–3, 6–2	(United States) Maria Mateas	(Peru) Lucciana Pérez Alarcón (United States) Ayana Akli	(United States) Usue Maitane Arconada (Poland) Olivia Lincer (Japan) Himeno Sakatsume (United States) Eryn Cayetano
September 30	Redding, United States; Hard; W35; Singles and doubles draws	(United States) Ayana Akli (United States) Eryn Cayetano; 6–2, 6–2	(United States) Clervie Ngounoue (Japan) Himeno Sakatsume	(Peru) Lucciana Pérez Alarcón (United States) Ayana Akli	(United States) Usue Maitane Arconada (Poland) Olivia Lincer (Japan) Himeno Sakatsume (United States) Eryn Cayetano
September 30	Sharm El Sheikh, Egypt; Hard; W15; Singles and doubles draws	Daria Egorova; 7–5, 6–0	(Egypt) Sandra Samir	(Egypt) Yasmin Ezzat; Anastasia Gasanova	(Chinese Taipei) Joanna Garland (Kazakhstan) Aruzhan Sagandikova (Poland) Zuzanna Pawlikowska (Brazil) Victória Luiza Barros
September 30	Sharm El Sheikh, Egypt; Hard; W15; Singles and doubles draws	(Poland) Zuzanna Pawlikowska (Egypt) Sandra Samir; 6–3, 6–4	Daria Egorova; Anastasia Gasanova	(Egypt) Yasmin Ezzat; Anastasia Gasanova	(Chinese Taipei) Joanna Garland (Kazakhstan) Aruzhan Sagandikova (Poland) Zuzanna Pawlikowska (Brazil) Victória Luiza Barros
September 30	Trnava, Slovakia; Hard (i); W15; Singles and doubles draws	(Slovakia) Nina Vargová; 6–1, 3–6, 6–3	(United Kingdom) Amelia Rajecki	(Luxembourg) Marie Weckerle (Slovakia) Radka Zelníčková	(Poland) Valeriia Olianovskaia (Denmark) Johanne Svendsen (Slovakia) Mia Pohánková (Slovakia) Katarína Kužmová
September 30	Trnava, Slovakia; Hard (i); W15; Singles and doubles draws	(Denmark) Rebecca Munk Mortensen (Denmark) Johanne Svendsen; 7–5, 7–6^{(7–2)}	(Hungary) Adrienn Nagy (Czech Republic) Ivana Šebestová	(Luxembourg) Marie Weckerle (Slovakia) Radka Zelníčková	(Poland) Valeriia Olianovskaia (Denmark) Johanne Svendsen (Slovakia) Mia Pohánková (Slovakia) Katarína Kužmová
September 30	Yeongwol, South Korea; Hard; W15; Singles and doubles draws	(South Korea) Back Da-yeon; 6–1, 6–2	(South Korea) Jeong Bo-young	(South Korea) Kim Da-bin (South Korea) Lee Eun-hye	(South Korea) Jeong Su-nam (South Korea) Kim Su-min (South Korea) Ahn Yu-jin (South Korea) Oh Eun-ji
September 30	Yeongwol, South Korea; Hard; W15; Singles and doubles draws	(South Korea) Back Da-yeon (South Korea) Lee Eun-hye; 6–1, 6–1	(South Korea) Kim Na-ri (China) Ye Qiuyu	(South Korea) Kim Da-bin (South Korea) Lee Eun-hye	(South Korea) Jeong Su-nam (South Korea) Kim Su-min (South Korea) Ahn Yu-jin (South Korea) Oh Eun-ji
September 30	Monastir, Tunisia; Hard; W15; Singles and doubles draws	(Cyprus) Daria Frayman; 6–3, 6–0	(Netherlands) Madelief Hageman	(Belgium) Eliessa Vanlangendonck (Venezuela) Sofía Elena Cabezas Domínguez	(France) Marie Villet (Austria) Arabella Koller (Italy) Viola Turini (India) Tanisha Kashyap
September 30	Monastir, Tunisia; Hard; W15; Singles and doubles draws	(United States) Marcella Cruz (Germany) Gina Marie Dittmann; 6–4, 6–4	(Netherlands) Madelief Hageman (Belgium) Vicky Van de Peer	(Belgium) Eliessa Vanlangendonck (Venezuela) Sofía Elena Cabezas Domínguez	(France) Marie Villet (Austria) Arabella Koller (Italy) Viola Turini (India) Tanisha Kashyap
