= 2024 Přerov Cup =

Tennis tournament

- Date: 19–25 August 2024
- Edition: 20th
- Category: ITF Women's World Tennis Tour
- Prize money: $60,000
- Surface: Clay / Outdoor
- Location: Přerov, Czech Republic

Champions

Singles
- (Germany) Noma Noha Akugue

Doubles
- Elena Pridankina / (Czech Republic) Julie Štruplová
- Přerov Cup

The 2024 Přerov Cup (also known as the Z-Group Cup by OKsystem for sponsorship purposes) was a professional tennis tournament played on outdoor clay courts. It was the twentieth edition of the tournament, which was part of the 2024 ITF Women's World Tennis Tour. It took place in Přerov, Czech Republic, between 19 and 25 August 2024.

== Champions ==
=== Singles ===
- (Germany) Noma Noha Akugue def. Kristina Dmitruk, 6–2, 3–6, 6–1

=== Doubles ===
- Elena Pridankina / (Czech Republic) Julie Štruplová def. (Germany) Noma Noha Akugue / (Greece) Sapfo Sakellaridi, 6–3, 6–4

== Singles main draw entrants ==
=== Seeds ===
Country	Player	Rank	Seed
NED	Anouk Koevermans	229	1
LTU	Justina Mikulskytė	231	2
	Elena Pridankina	244	3
BEL	Hanne Vandewinkel	246	4
CYP	Raluca Șerban	259	5
GER	Noma Noha Akugue	261	6
CZE	Julie Štruplová	267	7
SRB	Mia Ristić	269	8

- Rankings are as of 12 August 2024.

=== Other entrants ===
The following players received wildcards into the singles main draw:

- (Czech Republic) Alena Kovačková
- (Slovakia) Natália Kročková
- (Czech Republic) Eliška Ticháčková
- (Slovakia) Nina Vargová

The following player received entry into the singles main draw using a special ranking:

- Kristina Dmitruk

The following players received entry from the qualifying draw:

- Amina Anshba
- (Greece) Eleni Christofi
- (Germany) Amelie Justine Hejtmanek
- (Germany) Mina Hodzic
- (Czech Republic) Denise Hrdinková
- (Slovakia) Sofia Milatová
- (Mexico) María Portillo Ramírez
- (Croatia) Tara Würth

The following player received entry as a lucky loser:

- (United Kingdom) Freya Christie
