= 2023 Zubr Cup =

Tennis tournament

- Date: 21–27 August 2023
- Edition: 19th
- Category: ITF Women's World Tennis Tour
- Prize money: $60,000
- Surface: Clay / Outdoor
- Location: Přerov, Czech Republic

Champions

Singles
- (Serbia) Mia Ristić

Doubles
- (Greece) Sapfo Sakellaridi / (Czech Republic) Anna Sisková
- Zubr Cup

The 2023 Zubr Cup (branded as the Zubr Cup by OKsystem for sponsorship reasons) is a professional tennis tournament played on outdoor clay courts. It was the nineteenth edition of the tournament which was part of the 2023 ITF Women's World Tennis Tour. It took place in Přerov, Czech Republic between 21 and 27 August 2023.

== Champions ==
=== Singles ===
- (Serbia) Mia Ristić def. (Italy) Aurora Zantedeschi, 6–1, 6–2

=== Doubles ===
- (Greece) Sapfo Sakellaridi / (Czech Republic) Anna Sisková def. (Italy) Angelica Moratelli / (Italy) Camilla Rosatello, 6–2, 6–3

== Singles main draw entrants ==
=== Seeds ===
| Country | Player | Rank^{1} | Seed |
|---|---|---|---|
| SLO | Veronika Erjavec | 180 | 1 |
| CZE | Gabriela Knutson | 205 | 2 |
| ROU | Alexandra Cadanțu-Ignatik | 245 | 3 |
| | Darya Astakhova | 249 | 4 |
| TUR | Çağla Büyükakçay | 253 | 5 |
| GBR | Sonay Kartal | 255 | 6 |
| BDI | Sada Nahimana | 271 | 7 |
| CRO | Antonia Ružić | 287 | 8 |

- ^{1} Rankings are as of 14 August 2023.

=== Other entrants ===
The following players received wildcards into the singles main draw:

- (Czech Republic) Nikola Bartůňková
- (Czech Republic) Linda Klimovičová
- (Czech Republic) Laura Samsonová
- (Czech Republic) Kristýna Tomajková

The following players received entry from the qualifying draw:

- (Czech Republic) Aneta Laboutková
- (Romania) Andreea Mitu
- (Italy) Angelica Moratelli
- (Greece) Dimitra Pavlou
- (Serbia) Mia Ristić
- (Georgia (country)) Sofia Shapatava
- (Czech Republic) Vendula Valdmannová
- (Italy) Aurora Zantedeschi
