= 2022 Zubr Cup =

Tennis tournament

- Date: 22–27 August 2022
- Edition: 18th
- Category: ITF Women's World Tennis Tour
- Prize money: $60,000
- Surface: Clay / Outdoor
- Location: Přerov, Czech Republic

Champions

Singles
- (Czech Republic) Barbora Palicová

Doubles
- (Czech Republic) Anastasia Dețiuc / (Czech Republic) Miriam Kolodziejová
- Zubr Cup

The 2022 Zubr Cup was a professional tennis tournament played on outdoor clay courts. It was the eighteenth edition of the tournament which was part of the 2022 ITF Women's World Tennis Tour. It took place in Přerov, Czech Republic between 22 and 27 August 2022.

== Champions ==
=== Singles ===
- (Czech Republic) Barbora Palicová def. (Burundi) Sada Nahimana, 6–2, 1–6, 6–0

=== Doubles ===
- (Czech Republic) Anastasia Dețiuc / (Czech Republic) Miriam Kolodziejová def. (Japan) Funa Kozaki / (Japan) Misaki Matsuda, 7–6^{(7–4)}, 4–6, [10–5]

== Singles main draw entrants ==
=== Seeds ===
Country	Player	Rank^{1}	Seed
SRB	Natalija Stevanović	198	1
MKD	Lina Gjorcheska	238	2
GER	Katharina Hobgarski	240	3
	Natalia Vikhlyantseva	257	4
FRA	Carole Monnet	262	5
CZE	Anna Sisková	264	6
ESP	Ángela Fita Boluda	268	7
ITA	Camilla Rosatello	269	8

- ^{1} Rankings are as of 15 August 2022.

=== Other entrants ===
The following players received wildcards into the singles main draw:

- (Czech Republic) Linda Klimovičová
- (Czech Republic) Barbora Palicová
- (Czech Republic) Dominika Šalková
- (Czech Republic) Linda Ševčíková

The following players received entry from the qualifying draw:

- (Czech Republic) Nikola Bartůňková
- (Venezuela) Andrea Gámiz
- (Romania) Oana Gavrilă
- (Romania) Ilona Georgiana Ghioroaie
- Vera Lapko
- (Spain) Ane Mintegi del Olmo
- (Japan) Rina Saigo
- (Czech Republic) Julie Štruplová
