= 2024 Přerov Cup – Singles =

Singles
- 2024 Přerov Cup

Final
- Champion: (Germany) Noma Noha Akugue
- Runner-up: Kristina Dmitruk
- Score: 6–2, 3–6, 6–1

Events
Singles	Doubles
← 2023 ·	Přerov Cup	· 2025 →

Mia Ristić was the defending champion, but lost in the first round to Amina Anshba.

Noma Noha Akugue won the title, defeating Kristina Dmitruk in the final, 6–2, 3–6, 6–1.

== Seeds ==
1. (Netherlands) Anouk Koevermans (first round)
2. (Lithuania) Justina Mikulskytė (second round)
3. Elena Pridankina (quarterfinals)
4. (Belgium) Hanne Vandewinkel (quarterfinals)
5. (Cyprus) Raluca Șerban (first round)
6. (Germany) Noma Noha Akugue (champion)
7. (Czech Republic) Julie Štruplová (second round)
8. (Serbia) Mia Ristić (first round)

== Draw ==
=== Key ===
- Q = Qualifier
- WC = Wild card
- LL = Lucky loser
- Alt = Alternate
- SE = Special exempt
- PR = Protected ranking
- ITF = ITF entry
- JE = Junior exempt
- w/o = Walkover
- r = Retired
- d = Defaulted
- SR = Special ranking

=== Finals ===
Semifinals
(Czech Republic) Aneta Kučmová	4	6^{0}
6	(Germany) Noma Noha Akugue	6	7^{7}
(Spain) Ángela Fita Boluda	4	1
SR	Kristina Dmitruk	6	6

Final
6	(Germany) Noma Noha Akugue	6	3	6
SR	Kristina Dmitruk	2	6	1

=== Top half ===
First round
1	(Netherlands) A Koevermans	3	2
(Netherlands) E Vedder	6	6
WC	(Slovakia) N Kročková	2	3
(Czech Republic) A Kučmová	6	6
(Greece) S Sakellaridi	6	1	6
Q	(Germany) AJ Hejtmanek	1	6	0
Q	A Anshba	7	2	6
8	(Serbia) M Ristić	5	6	1
3	E Pridankina	6	6
Q	(Slovakia) S Milatová	0	1
LL	(United Kingdom) F Christie	3	1
WC	(Czech Republic) E Ticháčková	6	6
(Switzerland) Y In-Albon	3	6	6
(Switzerland) S Bandecchi	6	2	3
(Italy) T Pieri	2	6	6^{2}
6	(Germany) N Noha Akugue	6	2	7^{7}

Second round
(Netherlands) E Vedder	5	2
(Czech Republic) A Kučmová	7	6
(Greece) S Sakellaridi	5	1
Q	A Anshba	7	6
3	E Pridankina	7^{7}	6
WC	(Czech Republic) E Ticháčková	6^{4}	1
(Switzerland) Y In-Albon	4	0
6	(Germany) N Noha Akugue	6	6

Quarterfinals
(Czech Republic) A Kučmová	6	3	6
Q	A Anshba	3	6	2
3	E Pridankina	6	4	2
6	(Germany) N Noha Akugue	2	6	6

Semifinals
(Czech Republic) A Kučmová	4	6^{0}
6	(Germany) N Noha Akugue	6	7^{7}

=== Bottom half ===
First round
7	(Czech Republic) J Štruplová	7^{7}	6
(Italy) C Rosatello	6^{4}	2
Q	(Greece) E Christofi	1	2
(Spain) Á Fita Boluda	6	6
Q	(Germany) M Hodzic	4	3
Q	(Croatia) T Würth	6	6
Q	(Mexico) M Portillo Ramírez	5	7^{11}	4
4	(Belgium) H Vandewinkel	7	6^{9}	6
5	(Cyprus) R Șerban	6	1	2
(Spain) I Burillo Escorihuela	3	6	6
WC	(Slovakia) N Vargová	6	6
Q	(Czech Republic) D Hrdinková	3	1
SR	K Dmitruk	6	6
WC	(Czech Republic) A Kovačková	1	4
(Poland) G Feistel	3	4
2	(Lithuania) J Mikulskytė	6	6

Second round
7	(Czech Republic) J Štruplová	3	3
(Spain) Á Fita Boluda	6	6
Q	(Croatia) T Würth	3	7	3
4	(Belgium) H Vandewinkel	6	5	6
(Spain) I Burillo Escorihuela	6	6
WC	(Slovakia) N Vargová	4	4
SR	K Dmitruk	6	6
2	(Lithuania) J Mikulskytė	4	1

Quarterfinals
(Spain) Á Fita Boluda	6	6
4	(Belgium) H Vandewinkel	1	4
(Spain) I Burillo Escorihuela	5	6	4
SR	K Dmitruk	7	2	6

Semifinals
(Spain) Á Fita Boluda	4	1
SR	K Dmitruk	6	6
