= 2022 Zubr Cup – Singles =

Singles
- 2022 Zubr Cup

Final
- Champion: (Czech Republic) Barbora Palicová
- Runner-up: (Burundi) Sada Nahimana
- Score: 6–2, 1–6, 6–0

Events
Singles	Doubles
← 2021 ·	Zubr Cup	· 2023 →

Linda Nosková was the defending champion but chose to compete at the 2022 US Open qualifying instead.

Barbora Palicová won the title, defeating Sada Nahimana in the final, 6–2, 1–6, 6–0.

== Seeds ==
1. (Serbia) Natalija Stevanović (first round)
2. (North Macedonia) Lina Gjorcheska (second round)
3. (Germany) Katharina Hobgarski (quarterfinals)
4. Natalia Vikhlyantseva (first round)
5. (France) Carole Monnet (first round)
6. (Czech Republic) Anna Sisková (first round)
7. (Spain) Ángela Fita Boluda (second round)
8. (Italy) Camilla Rosatello (first round)

== Draw ==
=== Key ===
- Q = Qualifier
- WC = Wild card
- LL = Lucky loser
- Alt = Alternate
- SE = Special exempt
- PR = Protected ranking
- ITF = ITF entry
- JE = Junior exempt
- w/o = Walkover
- r = Retired
- d = Defaulted
- SR = Special ranking

=== Finals ===
Semifinals
(Spain) Irene Burillo Escorihuela	6	6^{2}	0
(Burundi) Sada Nahimana	4	7^{7}	6
WC	(Czech Republic) Barbora Palicová	6	7^{7}
Q	(Venezuela) Andrea Gámiz	0	6^{3}

Final
(Burundi) Sada Nahimana	2	6	0
WC	(Czech Republic) Barbora Palicová	6	1	6

=== Top half ===
First round
1	(Serbia) N Stevanović	2	0
(Netherlands) E Vedder	6	6
WC	(Czech Republic) L Klimovičová	0	6^{4}
(Spain) I Burillo Escorihuela	6	7^{7}
(Spain) G Maristany	6	6
Q	(Spain) A Mintegi del Olmo	0	2
(Chile) D Seguel	4	2
7	(Spain) Á Fita Boluda	6	6
3	(Germany) K Hobgarski	3	6	6
(Czech Republic) M Kolodziejová	6	2	3
(Lithuania) J Mikulskytė	2	2
(Slovakia) R Šramková	6	6
Q	(Romania) O Gavrilă	7	3	5
Q	(Romania) IG Ghioroaie	5	6	7
(Burundi) S Nahimana	4	6	6
6	(Czech Republic) A Sisková	6	3	3

Second round
(Netherlands) E Vedder	7^{7}	3	0
(Spain) I Burillo Escorihuela	6^{5}	6	6
(Spain) G Maristany	6	7^{7}
7	(Spain) Á Fita Boluda	3	6^{2}
3	(Germany) K Hobgarski	2	6	6
(Slovakia) R Šramková	6	4	3
Q	(Romania) IG Ghioroaie	2	2
(Burundi) S Nahimana	6	6

Quarterfinals
(Spain) I Burillo Escorihuela	6	6
(Spain) G Maristany	1	3
3	(Germany) K Hobgarski	7^{7}	1	1
(Burundi) S Nahimana	6^{4}	6	6

Semifinals
(Spain) I Burillo Escorihuela	6	6^{2}	0
(Burundi) S Nahimana	4	7^{7}	6

=== Bottom half ===
First round
8	(Italy) C Rosatello	3	7	3
(Spain) Y Cavallé Reimers	6	5	6
Q	(Japan) R Saigo	6	3	4
WC	(Czech Republic) B Palicová	3	6	6
(Latvia) D Vismane	6	3	6
(Spain) R Vicens Mas	2	6	1
WC	(Czech Republic) D Šalková	6	6
4	N Vikhlyantseva	1	1
5	(France) C Monnet	6	3	0
(Brazil) G Cé	4	6	6
WC	(Czech Republic) L Ševčíková	6^{2}	1
Q	(Venezuela) A Gámiz	7^{7}	6
Q	(Czech Republic) J Štruplová	3	7	3
Q	(Czech Republic) N Bartůňková	6	5	6
Q	V Lapko	6^{1}	2
2	(North Macedonia) L Gjorcheska	7^{7}	6

Second round
(Spain) Y Cavallé Reimers	1	4
WC	(Czech Republic) B Palicová	6	6
(Latvia) D Vismane	2	3
WC	(Czech Republic) D Šalková	6	6
(Brazil) G Cé	3	0
Q	(Venezuela) A Gámiz	6	6
Q	(Czech Republic) N Bartůňková	7	2	6
2	(North Macedonia) L Gjorcheska	5	6	2

Quarterfinals
WC	(Czech Republic) B Palicová	6	6
WC	(Czech Republic) D Šalková	1	4
Q	(Venezuela) A Gámiz	6	6
Q	(Czech Republic) N Bartůňková	2	0

Semifinals
WC	(Czech Republic) B Palicová	6	7^{7}
Q	(Venezuela) A Gámiz	0	6^{3}
