= 2023 Zubr Cup – Doubles =

Doubles
- 2023 Zubr Cup

Final
- Champions: (Greece) Sapfo Sakellaridi (Czech Republic) Anna Sisková
- Runners-up: (Italy) Angelica Moratelli (Italy) Camilla Rosatello
- Score: 6–2, 6–3

Events
Singles	Doubles
← 2022 ·	Zubr Cup	· 2024 →

Anastasia Dețiuc and Miriam Kolodziejová is the defending champions but chose not to participate.

Sapfo Sakellaridi and Anna Sisková won the title after defeating Angelica Moratelli and Camilla Rosatello 6–2, 6–3 in the final.

== Seeds ==
1. (Italy) Angelica Moratelli / (Italy) Camilla Rosatello (finals)
2. (Greece) Sapfo Sakellaridi / (Czech Republic) Anna Sisková (champions)
3. (Slovenia) Veronika Erjavec / (Czech Republic) Dominika Šalková (first round)
4. (Romania) Andreea Mitu / (Czech Republic) Renata Voráčová (quarterfinals)

== Draw ==
Key

- Q = Qualifier
- WC = Wild card
- LL = Lucky loser
- Alt = Alternate
- ITF = ITF entry
- PR = Protected ranking
- SR = Special ranking
- SE = Special exempt
- JE = Junior exempt
- JR = Junior Accelerator Programme entrant
- CO = College Accelerator Programme entrant
- NG = Next Gen Accelerator Program entrant
- w/o = Walkover
- r = Retired
- d = Defaulted

First round
1	(Italy) A Moratelli (Italy) C Rosatello	6	6
(Japan) R Saigo (Japan) Y Saigo	0	3
(Georgia (country)) S Shapatava (United Kingdom) E Webley-Smith	6	4	[4]
(Slovenia) P Lovrič (Hungary) A Nagy	3	6	[10]
4	(Romania) A Mitu (Czech Republic) R Voráčová	7	6
(Germany) T Morderger (Germany) Y Morderger	5	1
WC	(Czech Republic) T Krejčová (Czech Republic) J Paštiková	0	7	[6]
WC	(Switzerland) K Kozakova (Czech Republic) K Tomajková	6	5	[10]
(Italy) D Cherubini (Greece) D Pavlou	6	3	[8]
(Czech Republic) L Klimovičová (Czech Republic) J Štruplová	4	6	[10]
(Bulgaria) L Karatancheva (United States) C Scholl	7	6
3	(Slovenia) V Erjavec (Czech Republic) D Šalková	5	2
(Slovenia) N Potočnik (Hungary) N Szabanin	6	6
WC	(Czech Republic) A Šmejkalová (Czech Republic) V Valdmannová	4	2
(Czech Republic) A Laboutková (Czech Republic) I Šebestová	2	4
2	(Greece) S Sakellaridi (Czech Republic) A Sisková	6	6

Quarterfinals
1	(Italy) A Moratelli (Italy) C Rosatello	6	6
(Slovenia) P Lovrič (Hungary) A Nagy	3	3
4	(Romania) A Mitu (Czech Republic) R Voráčová	6^{5}	6	[7]
WC	(Switzerland) K Kozakova (Czech Republic) K Tomajková	7^{7}	3	[10]
(Czech Republic) L Klimovičová (Czech Republic) J Štruplová	5	1
(Bulgaria) L Karatancheva (United States) C Scholl	7	6
(Slovenia) N Potočnik (Hungary) N Szabanin	4	5
2	(Greece) S Sakellaridi (Czech Republic) A Sisková	6	7

Semifinals
1	(Italy) A Moratelli (Italy) C Rosatello	6	6
WC	(Switzerland) K Kozakova (Czech Republic) K Tomajková	3	3
(Bulgaria) L Karatancheva (United States) C Scholl	5	4
2	(Greece) S Sakellaridi (Czech Republic) A Sisková	7	6

Final
1	(Italy) A Moratelli (Italy) C Rosatello	2	3
2	(Greece) S Sakellaridi (Czech Republic) A Sisková	6	6
