= 2023 Zubr Cup – Singles =

Singles
- 2023 Zubr Cup

Final
- Champion: (Serbia) Mia Ristić
- Runner-up: (Italy) Aurora Zantedeschi
- Score: 6–1, 6–2

Events
Singles	Doubles
← 2022 ·	Zubr Cup	· 2024 →

Barbora Palicová was the defending champion but chose to compete at the 2023 US Open qualifying instead.

Mia Ristić won the title, defeating Aurora Zantedeschi in the final, 6–1, 6–2.

== Seeds ==
1. (Slovenia) Veronika Erjavec (second round)
2. (Czech Republic) Gabriela Knutson (second round)
3. (Romania) Alexandra Cadanțu-Ignatik (first round, retired)
4. Darya Astakhova (quarterfinals, retired)
5. (Turkey) Çağla Büyükakçay (first round)
6. (United Kingdom) Sonay Kartal (first round)
7. (Burundi) Sada Nahimana (first round)
8. (Croatia) Antonia Ružić (quarterfinals)

== Draw ==
Key

- Q = Qualifier
- WC = Wild card
- LL = Lucky loser
- Alt = Alternate
- ITF = ITF entry
- PR = Protected ranking
- SR = Special ranking
- SE = Special exempt
- JE = Junior exempt
- JR = Junior Accelerator Programme entrant
- CO = College Accelerator Programme entrant
- NG = Next Gen Accelerator Program entrant
- w/o = Walkover
- r = Retired
- d = Defaulted

=== Finals ===
Semifinals
Q	(Serbia) Mia Ristić	3	6	6
Q	(Romania) Andreea Mitu	6	1	2
Q	(Georgia (country)) Sofia Shapatava	2	3
Q	(Italy) Aurora Zantedeschi	6	6

Final
Q	(Serbia) Mia Ristić	6	6
Q	(Italy) Aurora Zantedeschi	1	2

=== Top half ===
First round
1	(Slovenia) V Erjavec	6	7
Q	(Greece) D Pavlou	2	5
Q	(Serbia) M Ristić	6	6
WC	(Czech Republic) L Samsonová	0	0
(Greece) S Sakellaridi	6	6
(Hungary) N Szabanin	4	2
Q	(Czech Republic) A Laboutková	5	1
8	(Croatia) A Ružić	7	6
3	(Romania) A Cadanțu-Ignatik	2^{r}
Q	(Romania) A Mitu	5
Q	(Czech Republic) V Valdmannová	6	6^{3}	5
Q	(Italy) A Moratelli	3	7^{7}	7
(Czech Republic) T Smitková	3	0
(Czech Republic) D Šalková	6	6
(United States) G Min	7^{7}	6
5	(Turkey) Ç Büyükakçay	6^{5}	3

Second round
1	(Slovenia) V Erjavec	2	4
Q	(Serbia) M Ristić	6	6
(Greece) S Sakellaridi	4	6^{6}
8	(Croatia) A Ružić	6	7^{8}
Q	(Romania) A Mitu	6	4	7
Q	(Italy) A Moratelli	1	6	5
(Czech Republic) D Šalková	3	6	6
(United States) G Min	6	4	3

Quarterfinals
Q	(Serbia) M Ristić	6	6
8	(Croatia) A Ružić	1	0
Q	(Romania) A Mitu	6	1	6
(Czech Republic) D Šalková	3	6	4

Semifinals
Q	(Serbia) M Ristić	3	6	6
Q	(Romania) A Mitu	6	1	2

=== Bottom half ===
First round
6	(United Kingdom) S Kartal	3	6^{4}
(Croatia) L Bošković	6	7^{7}
Q	(Georgia (country)) S Shapatava	4	7^{9}	7^{7}
WC	(Czech Republic) L Klimovičová	6	6^{7}	6^{5}
(Slovenia) N Potočnik	2	6	6
(Czech Republic) A Sisková	6	3	2
(Romania) A Prisăcariu	6	1	0
4	D Astakhova	2	6	6
7	(Burundi) S Nahimana	2	6	3
(Italy) C Rosatello	6	4	6
WC	(Czech Republic) K Tomajková	4	2
(Czech Republic) J Štruplová	6	6
Q	(Italy) A Zantedeschi	3	6	7
WC	(Czech Republic) N Bartůňková	6	4	5
(Japan) R Saigo	2	6	1
2	(Czech Republic) G Knutson	6	3	6

Second round
(Croatia) L Bošković	6^{6}	1
Q	(Georgia (country)) S Shapatava	7^{8}	6
(Slovenia) N Potočnik	3	0
4	D Astakhova	6	6
(Italy) C Rosatello	6	6
(Czech Republic) J Štruplová	2	1
Q	(Italy) A Zantedeschi	6	6
2	(Czech Republic) G Knutson	4	3

Quarterfinals
Q	(Georgia (country)) S Shapatava	6	4
4	D Astakhova	2	0^{r}
(Italy) C Rosatello	6^{7}	4
Q	(Italy) A Zantedeschi	7^{7}	6

Semifinals
Q	(Georgia (country)) S Shapatava	2	3
Q	(Italy) A Zantedeschi	6	6
