= 2021 Zubr Cup =

Tennis tournament

- Date: 23–29 August 2021
- Edition: 17th
- Category: ITF Women's World Tennis Tour
- Prize money: $60,000
- Surface: Clay
- Location: Přerov, Czech Republic

Champions

Singles
- (Czech Republic) Linda Nosková

Doubles
- (Brazil) Carolina Alves / (United Kingdom) Sarah Beth Grey
- Zubr Cup

The 2021 Zubr Cup was a professional women's tennis tournament played on outdoor clay courts. It was the seventeenth edition of the tournament which was part of the 2021 ITF Women's World Tennis Tour. It took place in Přerov, Czech Republic between 23 and 29 August 2021.

== Singles main-draw entrants ==
=== Seeds ===
| Country | Player | Rank^{1} | Seed |
|---|---|---|---|
| AUS | Seone Mendez | 222 | 1 |
| FRA | Diane Parry | 236 | 2 |
| RUS | Anastasia Zakharova | 244 | 3 |
| MEX | Ana Sofía Sánchez | 253 | 4 |
| BRA | Gabriela Cé | 258 | 5 |
| ROU | Alexandra Ignatik | 262 | 6 |
| SUI | Simona Waltert | 265 | 7 |
| CRO | Tena Lukas | 270 | 8 |

- ^{1} Rankings are as of 16 August 2021.

=== Other entrants ===
The following players received wildcards into the singles main draw:

- (Czech Republic) Monika Kilnarová
- (Czech Republic) Linda Nosková
- (Czech Republic) Dominika Šalková
- (Czech Republic) Darja Viďmanová

The following player received entry using a protected ranking:

- (Germany) Anna Zaja

The following player received entry as a special exempt:

- (Czech Republic) Anna Sisková

The following players received entry from the qualifying draw:

- (Czech Republic) Nikola Bartůňková
- (Venezuela) Andrea Gámiz
- (United Kingdom) Sarah Beth Grey
- (Japan) Misaki Matsuda
- (Slovakia) Tereza Mihalíková
- (South Korea) Park So-hyun
- (France) Alice Ramé
- (Czech Republic) Tereza Smitková

The following player received entry as a lucky loser:

- (Czech Republic) Sára Bejlek

== Champions ==
=== Singles ===
- (Czech Republic) Linda Nosková def. (Romania) Alexandra Ignatik, 6–7^{(2–7)}, 6–4, 6–3

=== Doubles ===
- (Brazil) Carolina Alves / (United Kingdom) Sarah Beth Grey def. (Japan) Mana Kawamura / (Japan) Funa Kozaki, 6–4, 3–6, [13–11]
