= 2026 Billie Jean King Cup Europe/Africa Zone =

Subsection of tennis competition

The Europe/Africa Zone is one of three zones of regional competition in the 2026 Billie Jean King Cup.

== Group I ==
- Date: 7–11 April 2026
- Venue: Complexo de Tenis Jamor, Oeiras, Portugal
- Surface: Clay

Four round-robin pools of four teams, followed by promotional/relegation play-offs. Three teams will be promoted to the play-offs in November 2026, whereas four teams to lose their relegation play-offs drop down to Europe/Africa Group II in 2027.

=== Participating teams ===
#: Nations Ranking as of 17 November 2025.

- Croatia (#27)
- Denmark (#26)
- France (#22)
- Georgia (#48)
- Germany (#16)
- Hungary (#36)
- Latvia (#33)
- Lithuania (#42)
- Netherlands (#14)
- Norway (#50)
- Portugal (#30)
- Romania (#15)
- Serbia (#34)
- Slovakia (#11)
- Sweden (#40)
- Türkiye (#23)

=== Pool A ===
Pos.	Country	Ties W–L	Matches W–L	Sets W–L
1	Serbia	3–0	7–2	14–5
2	Slovakia	2–1	7–2	14–4
3	Croatia	1–2	4–5	8–10
4	Lithuania	0–3	0–9	1–18

==== Slovakia vs Serbia ====
Slovakia
1
Complexo de Tenis Jamor, Oeiras, Portugal
7–8 April 2026
Clay

Serbia
2

			1	2	3
1	(Slovakia) (Serbia)	Mia Pohánková; Teodora Kostović	4; 6	1; 6
2	(Slovakia) (Serbia)	Rebecca Šramková; Lola Radivojević	2; 6	2; 6
3	(Slovakia) (Serbia)	Viktória Hrunčáková / Tereza Mihalíková; Aleksandra Krunić / Natalija Senić	6; 4	6; 4

==== Croatia vs Lithuania ====
Croatia
3
Complexo de Tenis Jamor, Oeiras, Portugal
7–8 April 2026
Clay

Lithuania
0

			1	2	3
1	(Croatia) (Lithuania)	Petra Marčinko; Andrė Lukošiūtė	6; 0	6; 1
2	(Croatia) (Lithuania)	Antonia Ružić; Justina Mikulskytė	6; 1	6; 3
3	(Croatia) (Lithuania)	Lucija Ćirić Bagarić / Tara Würth; Iveta Dapkutė / Andrė Lukošiūtė	6; 1	6; 2

==== Slovakia vs Lithuania ====
Slovakia
3
Complexo de Tenis Jamor, Oeiras, Portugal
8 April 2026
Clay

Lithuania
0

			1	2	3
1	(Slovakia) (Lithuania)	Mia Pohánková; Andrė Lukošiūtė	6; 3	6; 0
2	(Slovakia) (Lithuania)	Rebecca Šramková; Justina Mikulskytė	6; 4	6; 3
3	(Slovakia) (Lithuania)	Viktória Hrunčáková / Tereza Mihalíková; Andrė Lukošiūtė / Justina Mikulskytė	6; 1	6; 3

==== Croatia vs Serbia ====
Croatia
1
Complexo de Tenis Jamor, Oeiras, Portugal
8 April 2026
Clay

Serbia
2

			1	2	3
1	(Croatia) (Serbia)	Petra Marčinko; Teodora Kostović	4; 6	1; 6
2	(Croatia) (Serbia)	Antonia Ružić; Lola Radivojević	4; 6	4; 6
3	(Croatia) (Serbia)	Lucija Ćirić Bagarić / Tara Würth; Aleksandra Krunić / Mia Ristić	6; 3	7^{8} 6^{6}

==== Slovakia vs Croatia ====
Slovakia
3
Complexo de Tenis Jamor, Oeiras, Portugal
9 April 2026
Clay

Croatia
0

			1	2	3
1	(Slovakia) (Croatia)	Mia Pohánková; Lea Bošković	7^{8} 6^{6}	6; 3
2	(Slovakia) (Croatia)	Rebecca Šramková; Tara Wuerth	6; 4	7; 5
3	(Slovakia) (Croatia)	Viktória Hrunčáková / Tereza Mihalíková; Lucija Ćirić Bagarić / Tara Würth	6; 2	7^{7} 6^{5}

==== Serbia vs Lithuania ====
Serbia
3
Complexo de Tenis Jamor, Oeiras, Portugal
9 April 2026
Clay

Lithuania
0

			1	2	3
1	(Serbia) (Lithuania)	Natalija Senić; Iveta Dapkutė	6; 0	6; 2
2	(Serbia) (Lithuania)	Mia Ristić; Justina Mikulskytė	7^{7} 6^{1}	6^{4} 7^{7}	6; 3
3	(Serbia) (Lithuania)	Aleksandra Krunić / Natalija Senić; Iveta Dapkutė / Kamilė Seliukaitė	6; 1	6; 0

=== Pool B ===
Pos.	Country	Ties W–L	Matches W–L	Sets W–L
1	Hungary	2–1	6–3	13–6
2	Turkey	2–1	5–3	10–8
3	Netherlands	1–2	4–4	9–10
4	Georgia	1–2	2–7	6–14

==== Netherlands vs Hungary ====
Netherlands
1
Complexo de Tenis Jamor, Oeiras, Portugal
7–8 April 2026
Clay

Hungary
2

			1	2	3
1	(Netherlands) (Hungary)	Anouk Koevermans; Amarissa Tóth	2; 6	6; 1	7^{7} 6^{2}
2	(Netherlands) (Hungary)	Suzan Lamens; Anna Bondár	6^{5} 7^{7}	1; 6
3	(Netherlands) (Hungary)	Anouk Koevermans / Suzan Lamens; Anna Bondár / Adrienn Nagy	4; 6	4; 6

==== Turkey vs Georgia ====
Turkey
3
Complexo de Tenis Jamor, Oeiras, Portugal
7–8 April 2026
Clay

Georgia
0

			1	2	3
1	(Turkey) (Georgia (country))	Berfu Cengiz; Mariam Bolkvadze	1; 6	6; 4	6; 0
2	(Turkey) (Georgia (country))	Ayla Aksu; Ekaterine Gorgodze	6; 3	7^{8} 6^{6}
3	(Turkey) (Georgia (country))	Berfu Cengiz / İpek Öz; Zoziya Kardava / Sofia Shapatava	6; 4	6; 1

==== Netherlands vs Georgia ====
Netherlands
3
Complexo de Tenis Jamor, Oeiras, Portugal
8 April 2026
Clay

Georgia
0

			1	2	3
1	(Netherlands) (Georgia (country))	Anouk Koevermans; Sofia Shapatava	6; 0	6; 3
2	(Netherlands) (Georgia (country))	Suzan Lamens; Ekaterine Gorgodze	3; 6	6; 0	6; 2
3	(Netherlands) (Georgia (country))	Britt Du Pree / Anouck Vrancken Peeters; Zoziya Kardava / Sofia Shapatava	6; 1	6; 1

==== Turkey vs Hungary ====
Turkey
0
Complexo de Tenis Jamor, Oeiras, Portugal
8 April 2026
Clay

Hungary
3

			1	2	3
1	(Turkey) (Hungary)	İpek Öz; Amarissa Tóth	3; 6	4; 6
2	(Turkey) (Hungary)	Ayla Aksu; Anna Bondár	2; 6	2; 6
3	(Turkey) (Hungary)	Ada Kumru / İpek Öz; Adrienn Nagy / Gréta Nemcsek	4; 6	2; 6

==== Hungary vs Georgia ====
Hungary
1
Complexo de Tenis Jamor, Oeiras, Portugal
9 April 2026
Clay

Georgia
2

			1	2	3
1	(Hungary) (Georgia (country))	Gréta Nemcsek; Mariam Bolkvadze	4; 6	2; 6
2	(Hungary) (Georgia (country))	Adrienn Nagy; Sofia Shapatava	4; 6	5; 7
3	(Hungary) (Georgia (country))	Adrienn Nagy / Amarissa Tóth; Mariam Bolkvadze / Zoziya Kardava				w/o

==== Netherlands vs Turkey ====
Netherlands
0
Complexo de Tenis Jamor, Oeiras, Portugal
9 April 2026
Clay

Turkey
2

			1	2	3
1	(Netherlands) (Turkey)	Anouck Vrancken Peeters; Berfu Cengiz	4; 6	6; 2	5; 7
2	(Netherlands) (Turkey)	Suzan Lamens; Ayla Aksu	2; 6	2; 6
3	(Netherlands) (Turkey)	Britt Du Pree / Anouck Vrancken Peeters; Berfu Cengiz / İpek Öz				not played

=== Pool C ===
Pos.	Country	Ties W–L	Matches W–L	Sets W–L
1	France	3–0	8–1	16–3
2	Latvia	2–1	5–4	11–10
3	Romania	1–2	5–4	12–10
4	Norway	0–3	0–9	2–18

==== Romania vs Latvia ====
Romania
1
Complexo de Tenis Jamor, Oeiras, Portugal
8 April 2026
Clay

Latvia
2

			1	2	3
1	(Romania) (Latvia)	Gabriela Lee; Beatrise Zeltiņa	4; 6	6; 4	1; 6
2	(Romania) (Latvia)	Elena Ruxandra Bertea; Adelina Lacinova	0; 6	5; 7
3	(Romania) (Latvia)	Ilinca Dalina Amariei / Carmen Andreea Herea; Daniela Darta Feldmane / Beatrise Zeltiņa	6; 4	0; 6	10; 3

==== France vs Norway ====
France
3
Complexo de Tenis Jamor, Oeiras, Portugal
8 April 2026
Clay

Norway
0

			1	2	3
1	(France) (Norway)	Leolia Jeanjean; Astrid Wanja Brune Olsen	6; 1	6; 1
2	(France) (Norway)	Elsa Jacquemot; Malene Helgø	6; 1	6; 3
3	(France) (Norway)	Kristina Mladenovic / Tiantsoa Sarah Rakotomanga Rajaonah; Matylda Burylo / Katja Wiersholm	6; 2	6; 0

==== France vs Latvia ====
France
3
Complexo de Tenis Jamor, Oeiras, Portugal
8 April 2026
Clay

Latvia
0

			1	2	3
1	(France) (Latvia)	Leolia Jeanjean; Beatrise Zeltiņa	6; 3	6; 4
2	(France) (Latvia)	Elsa Jacquemot; Adelina Lacinova	6; 1	6; 0
3	(France) (Latvia)	Kristina Mladenovic / Tiantsoa Sarah Rakotomanga Rajaonah; Daniela Darta Feldmane / Anna Ozerova	6; 3	6; 2

==== Romania vs Norway ====
Romania
3
Complexo de Tenis Jamor, Oeiras, Portugal
8-9 April 2026
Clay

Norway
0

			1	2	3
1	(Romania) (Norway)	Carmen Andreea Herea; Katja Wiersholm	6; 3	6; 4
2	(Romania) (Norway)	Elena Ruxandra Bertea; Malene Helgø	3; 6	6; 1	6; 3
3	(Romania) (Norway)	Ilinca Dalina Amariei / Anamaria Federica Oana; Astrid Wanja Brune Olsen / Katja Wiersholm	6; 2	6; 4

==== Romania vs France ====
Romania
1
Complexo de Tenis Jamor, Oeiras, Portugal
9 April 2026
Clay

France
2

			1	2	3
1	(Romania) (France)	Carmen Andreea Herea; Kristina Mladenovic	6; 3	6; 2
2	(Romania) (France)	Elena Ruxandra Bertea; Leolia Jeanjean	2; 6	5; 7
3	(Romania) (France)	Ilinca Dalina Amariei / Carmen Andreea Herea; Leolia Jeanjean / Kristina Mladenovic	7^{12} 6^{10}	2; 6	10; 12

==== Latvia vs Norway ====
Latvia
3
Complexo de Tenis Jamor, Oeiras, Portugal
9 April 2026
Clay

Norway
0

			1	2	3
1	(Latvia) (Norway)	Beatrise Zeltiņa; Katja Wiersholm	6; 3	6; 0
2	(Latvia) (Norway)	Adelina Lacinova; Astrid Wanja Brune Olsen	5; 7	6; 2	6; 0
3	(Latvia) (Norway)	Adelina Lacinova / Beatrise Zeltiņa; Matylda Burylo / Katja Wiersholm	6; 3	6; 2

=== Pool D ===
Pos.	Country	Ties W–L	Matches W–L	Sets W–L
1	Sweden	3–0	6–3	14–9
2	Portugal	2–1	6–3	13–8
3	Germany	1–2	4–4	8–9
4	Denmark	0–3	1–7	6–15

==== Germany vs Portugal ====
Germany
1
Complexo de Tenis Jamor, Oeiras, Portugal
7–8 April 2026
Clay

Portugal
2

			1	2	3
1	(Germany) (Portugal)	Noma Noha Akugue; Matilde Jorge	6; 4	7; 5
2	(Germany) (Portugal)	Ella Seidel; Francisca Jorge	2; 6	5; 7
3	(Germany) (Portugal)	Tessa Johanna Brockmann / Noma Noha Akugue; Francisca Jorge / Matilde Jorge	1; 6	5; 7

==== Denmark vs Sweden ====
Denmark
1
Complexo de Tenis Jamor, Oeiras, Portugal
7–8 April 2026
Clay

Sweden
2

			1	2	3
1	(Denmark) (Sweden)	Rebecca Munk Mortensen; Caijsa Hennemann	7; 5	4; 6	3; 6
2	(Denmark) (Sweden)	Johanne Svendsen; Kajsa Rinaldo Persson	3; 6	6; 3	0; 6
3	(Denmark) (Sweden)	Emma Kamper / Johanne Svendsen; Linea Bajraliu / Lisa Zaar	6; 3	0; 6	12; 10

==== Germany vs Sweden ====
Germany
1
Complexo de Tenis Jamor, Oeiras, Portugal
8 April 2026
Clay

Sweden
2

			1	2	3
1	(Germany) (Sweden)	Noma Noha Akugue; Caijsa Hennemann	6^{6} 7^{8}	4; 6
2	(Germany) (Sweden)	Ella Seidel; Kajsa Rinaldo Persson	6; 1	6; 3
3	(Germany) (Sweden)	Tessa Johanna Brockmann / Ella Seidel; Caijsa Hennemann / Lisa Zaar	2; 6	4; 6

==== Denmark vs Portugal ====
Denmark
0
Complexo de Tenis Jamor, Oeiras, Portugal
8 April 2026
Clay

Portugal
3

			1	2	3
1	(Denmark) (Portugal)	Rebecca Munk Mortensen; Angelina Voloshchuk	2; 6	3; 6
2	(Denmark) (Portugal)	Johanne Svendsen; Francisca Jorge	6; 1	0; 6	2; 6
3	(Denmark) (Portugal)	Emma Kamper / Sophia Izabella Ragus; Francisca Jorge / Matilde Jorge	1; 6	3; 6

==== Germany vs Denmark ====
Germany
2
Complexo de Tenis Jamor, Oeiras, Portugal
9 April 2026
Clay

Denmark
0

			1	2	3
1	(Germany) (Denmark)	Noma Noha Akugue; Rebecca Munk Mortensen	6; 4	6; 1
2	(Germany) (Denmark)	Ella Seidel; Johanne Svendsen	1; 6	7^{10} 6^{8}	6; 0
3	(Germany) (Denmark)	Tessa Johanna Brockmann / Nastasja Schunk; Emma Kamper / Sophia Izabella Ragus				not played

==== Portugal vs Sweden ====
Portugal
1
Complexo de Tenis Jamor, Oeiras, Portugal
9 April 2026
Clay

Sweden
2

			1	2	3
1	(Portugal) (Sweden)	Angelina Voloshchuk; Caijsa Hennemann	6; 3	4; 6	6; 3
2	(Portugal) (Sweden)	Francisca Jorge; Kajsa Rinaldo Persson	4; 6	4; 6
3	(Portugal) (Sweden)	Francisca Jorge / Matilde Jorge; Caijsa Hennemann / Lisa Zaar	6; 4	4; 6	3; 10

=== Promotion play-offs ===
Round one

==== Serbia vs Sweden ====
Serbia
1
Complexo de Tenis Jamor, Oeiras, Portugal
10 April 2026
Clay

Sweden
2

			1	2	3
1	(Serbia) (Sweden)	Teodora Kostović; Caijsa Hennemann	6; 3	7; 5
2	(Serbia) (Sweden)	Lola Radivojević; Kajsa Rinaldo Persson	6; 3	4; 6	1; 6
3	(Serbia) (Sweden)	Aleksandra Krunić / Natalija Senić; Caijsa Hennemann / Lisa Zaar	4; 6	1; 6

==== Hungary vs France ====
Hungary
2
Complexo de Tenis Jamor, Oeiras, Portugal
10 April 2026
Clay

France
0

			1	2	3
1	(Hungary) (France)	Amarissa Tóth; Léolia Jeanjean	6; 4	6; 3
2	(Hungary) (France)	Anna Bondár; Elsa Jacquemot	6; 1	7^{7} 6^{3}
3	(Hungary) (France)	Anna Bondár / Adrienn Nagy; Kristina Mladenovic / Tiantsoa Rakotomanga Rajaonah				not played

Round two (losers of round one)

==== Serbia vs France ====
Serbia
0
Complexo de Tenis Jamor, Oeiras, Portugal
11 April 2026
Clay

France
2

			1	2	3
1	(Serbia) (France)	Teodora Kostović; Tiantsoa Rakotomanga Rajaonah	6; 3	6^{5} 7^{7}	2; 6
2	(Serbia) (France)	Lola Radivojević; Elsa Jacquemot	4; 6	6; 4	3; 6
3	(Serbia) (France)	Aleksandra Krunić / Natalija Senić; Kristina Mladenovic / Tiantsoa Rakotomanga Rajaonah				not played

=== Positional play-offs ===
==== Slovakia vs Portugal ====
Slovakia
2
Complexo de Tenis Jamor, Oeiras, Portugal
10 April 2026
Clay

Portugal
0

			1	2	3
1	(Slovakia) (Portugal)	Mia Pohánková; Gabriela Agra Amorim	6; 0	6; 0
2	(Slovakia) (Portugal)	Rebecca Šramková; Madalena Matias	6; 1	6; 1
3	(Slovakia) (Portugal)	Viktória Hrunčáková / Tereza Mihalíková; Gabriela Agra Amorim / Madalena Matias				not played

==== Turkey vs Latvia ====
Turkey
0
Complexo de Tenis Jamor, Oeiras, Portugal
10 April 2026
Clay

Latvia
2

			1	2	3
1	(Turkey) (Latvia)	Ada Kumru; Beatrise Zeltiņa	2; 6	2; 6
2	(Turkey) (Latvia)	İrem Kurt; Adelina Lachinova	3; 6	2; 6
3	(Turkey) (Latvia)	Ada Kumru / İrem Kurt; Daniela Dārta Feldmane / Anna Ozerova				not played

=== Relegation play-offs ===
==== Croatia vs Denmark ====
Croatia
2
Complexo de Tenis Jamor, Oeiras, Portugal
10 April 2026
Clay

Denmark
0

			1	2	3
1	(Croatia) (Denmark)	Petra Marčinko; Rebecca Munk Mortensen	7; 5	6; 1
2	(Croatia) (Denmark)	Antonia Ružić; Johanne Svendsen	7; 5	6; 4
3	(Croatia) (Denmark)	Lucija Ćirić Bagarić / Tara Würth; Emma Kamper / Sophia Izabella Ragus				not played

==== Netherlands vs Norway ====
Netherlands
2
Complexo de Tenis Jamor, Oeiras, Portugal
10 April 2026
Clay

Norway
0

			1	2	3
1	(Netherlands) (Norway)	Anouk Koevermans; Katja Wiersholm	6; 0	7; 5
2	(Netherlands) (Norway)	Suzan Lamens; Malene Helgø	6^{3} 7^{7}	6; 4	6; 2
3	(Netherlands) (Norway)	Britt Du Pree / Anouck Vrancken Peeters; Astrid Wanja Brune Olsen / Malene Helgø				not played

==== Romania vs Georgia ====
Romania
2
Complexo de Tenis Jamor, Oeiras, Portugal
11 April 2026
Clay

Georgia
0

			1	2	3
1	(Romania) (Georgia (country))	Carmen Andreea Herea; Sofia Shapatava	6; 4	2; 6	6; 2
2	(Romania) (Georgia (country))	Elena Ruxandra Bertea; Ekaterine Gorgodze	4; 6	6; 1	6; 4
3	(Romania) (Georgia (country))	Ilinca Amariei / Carmen Andreea Herea; Mariam Bolkvadze / Ekaterine Gorgodze				not played

==== Germany vs Lithuania ====
Germany
1
Complexo de Tenis Jamor, Oeiras, Portugal
11 April 2026
Clay

Lithuania
2

			1	2	3
1	(Germany) (Lithuania)	Noma Noha Akugue; Andrė Lukošiūtė	6; 4	6; 4
2	(Germany) (Lithuania)	Ella Seidel; Justina Mikulskytė	6; 1	3; 6	2; 6
3	(Germany) (Lithuania)	Noma Noha Akugue / Nastasja Schunk; Andrė Lukošiūtė / Justina Mikulskytė	7; 5	3; 6	8; 10

=== Promotions/Relegations ===
- France, Hungary and Sweden advanced to the 2026 Billie Jean King Cup play-offs.
- Denmark, Georgia, Germany and Norway were relegated to Europe/Africa Zone Group II in 2027.

== Group II ==
Date: 6–11 April 2026
Venue: Tennis Association RS, Banja Luka, Bosnia and Herzegovina (Clay)

=== Participating teams ===
#: Nations Ranking as of 17 November 2025.

- Austria (#38)
- Bosnia and Herzegovina (#59)
- Bulgaria (#44)
- Cyprus (#63)
- Egypt (#61)
- Finland (#66)
- Greece (#47)
- Morocco (#60)
- North Macedonia (#58)
- South Africa (#72)

Withdrawn

- Israel (#74)

=== Pool A ===
		AUT	GRE	BIH	CYP	FIN
1	Austria		0–3	1–2	2–1	0–3
2	Greece	3–0		2–1	3–0	3–0
3	Bosnia and Herzegovina	2–1	1–2		1–2	1–2
4	Cyprus	1–2	0–3	2–1		2–1
5	Finland	3–0	0–3	2–1	1–2	

Pos.	Country	Ties W–L	Matches W–L	Sets W–L
1	Greece	4–0	11–1	23–5
2	Cyprus	2–2	5–7	13–18
3	Finland	2–2	6–6	14–16
4	Bosnia and Herzegovina	1–3	5–7	14–17
5	Austria	1–3	3–9	10–18

=== Pool B ===
		BUL	MKD	MAR	EGY	RSA
1	Bulgaria		3–0	2–1	3–0	3–0
2	North Macedonia	0–3		0–3	0–3	0–3
3	Morocco	1–2	3–0		2–1	0–3
4	Egypt	0–3	3–0	1–2		1–2
5	South Africa	0–3	3–0	3–0	2–1	

Pos.	Country	Ties W–L	Matches W–L	Sets W–L
1	Bulgaria	4–0	11–1	22–3
2	South Africa	3–1	8–4	17–8
3	Morocco	2–2	6–6	12–14
4	Egypt	1–3	5–7	12–14
5	North Macedonia	0–4	0–12	0–21

=== Promotion play-offs ===
==== Greece vs South Africa ====
Greece
2
Tennis Association RS, Banja Luka, Bosnia and Herzegovina
11 April 2026
Clay

South Africa
0

			1	2	3
1	(Greece) (South Africa)	Despina Papamichail; Isabella Kruger	6; 2	6; 3
2	(Greece) (South Africa)	Maria Sakkari; Jahnie van Zyl	6; 4	6; 1
3	(Greece) (South Africa)	Elena Korokozidi / Martha Matoula; Isabella Kruger / Jahnie van Zyl				not played

==== Bulgaria vs Cyprus ====
Bulgaria
2
Tennis Association RS, Banja Luka, Bosnia and Herzegovina
11 April 2026
Clay

Cyprus
0

			1	2	3
1	(Bulgaria) (Cyprus)	Rositsa Dencheva; Nina Andronicou	7^{7} 6^{4}	6; 3
2	(Bulgaria) (Cyprus)	Elizara Yaneva; Andrea Georgiou Papakyriacou	6; 0	6; 2
3	(Bulgaria) (Cyprus)	Rositsa Dencheva / Elizara Yaneva; Nina Andronicou / Raluca Georgiana Șerban				not played

=== Relegation play-offs ===
==== Finland vs Egypt ====
Finland
2
Tennis Association RS, Banja Luka, Bosnia and Herzegovina
11 April 2026
Clay

Egypt
1

			1	2	3
1	(Finland) (Egypt)	Ella Haavisto; Lamis Alhussein Abdel Aziz	1; 6	5; 7
2	(Finland) (Egypt)	Laura Hietaranta; Sandra Samir	6; 1	7; 5
3	(Finland) (Egypt)	Clarissa Blomqvist / Laura Hietaranta; Lamis Alhussein Abdel Aziz / Sandra Samir	1; 6	7; 5	10; 4

==== Morocco vs Bosnia and Herzegovina ====
Morocco
2
Tennis Association RS, Banja Luka, Bosnia and Herzegovina
11 April 2026
Clay

Bosnia and Herzegovina
1

			1	2	3
1	(Morocco) (Bosnia and Herzegovina)	Diae El Jardi; Sara Mikaca	4; 6	6; 4	6^{1} 7^{7}
2	(Morocco) (Bosnia and Herzegovina)	Yasmine Kabbaj; Ema Burgić	6; 2	6; 0
3	(Morocco) (Bosnia and Herzegovina)	Diae El Jardi / Yasmine Kabbaj; Tea Kovacević / Anita Wagner	6; 2	6; 2

=== Positional play-off ===
==== Austria vs North Macedonia ====
Austria
2
Tennis Association RS, Banja Luka, Bosnia and Herzegovina
11 April 2026
Clay

North Macedonia
0

			1	2	3
1	(Austria) (North Macedonia)	Claudia Gasparovic; Ana Mitevska	6; 2	6; 1
2	(Austria) (North Macedonia)	Ekaterina Perelygina; Sara Mitevska	6; 2	6; 4
3	(Austria) (North Macedonia)	Claudia Gasparovic / Ekaterina Perelygina; Jana Bozinovska / Zara Zafirovska				not played

=== Promotions/Relegations ===
- Bulgaria and Greece were promoted to Europe/Africa Zone Group I in 2027.
- Austria, Bosnia and Herzegovina and North Macedonia were relegated to Europe Zone Group III in 2027.
- Egypt was relegated to Africa Zone Group III in 2027.
