= 2021 Zubr Cup – Singles =

Singles
- 2021 Zubr Cup

Final
- Champion: (Czech Republic) Linda Nosková
- Runner-up: (Romania) Alexandra Ignatik
- Score: 6–7^{(2–7)}, 6–4, 6–3

Events
Singles	Doubles
← 2020 ·	Zubr Cup	· 2022 →

Grace Min was the defending champion, but chose to participate at the US Open Qualifying instead.

Linda Nosková won the title, defeating Alexandra Ignatik in the final, 6–7^{(2–7)}, 6–4, 6–3.

== Seeds ==
1. (Australia) Seone Mendez (first round)
2. (France) Diane Parry (first round)
3. (Russia) Anastasia Zakharova (first round)
4. (Mexico) Ana Sofía Sánchez (first round)
5. (Brazil) Gabriela Cé (first round)
6. (Romania) Alexandra Ignatik (final)
7. (Switzerland) Simona Waltert (quarterfinals)
8. (Croatia) Tena Lukas (first round)

== Draw ==
=== Key ===
- Q = Qualifier
- WC = Wild card
- LL = Lucky loser
- Alt = Alternate
- SE = Special exempt
- PR = Protected ranking
- ITF = ITF entry
- JE = Junior exempt
- w/o = Walkover
- r = Retired
- d = Defaulted
- SR = Special ranking

=== Finals ===
Semifinals
WC	(Czech Republic) Monika Kilnarová	3	2
6	(Romania) Alexandra Ignatik	6	6
WC	(Czech Republic) Linda Nosková	6	6
WC	(Czech Republic) Dominika Šalková	3	2

Final
6	(Romania) Alexandra Ignatik	7^{7}	4	3
WC	(Czech Republic) Linda Nosková	6^{2}	6	6

=== Top half ===
First round
1	(Australia) S Mendez	3	4
(Czech Republic) J Malečková	6	6
WC	(Czech Republic) M Kilnarová	6	6
(Belgium) L Salden	2	3
(Czech Republic) M Kolodziejová	3	6	5
(Brazil) C Alves	6	2	7
Q	(South Korea) S-h Park	6	6
8	(Croatia) T Lukas	3	0
3	(Russia) A Zakharova	4	4
(Italy) M Di Giuseppe	6	6
Q	(Czech Republic) T Smitková	4	6	7^{7}
(Turkey) P Özgen	6	4	6^{5}
Q	(Czech Republic) N Bartůňková	6	6
PR	(Germany) A Zaja	3	4
Q	(Japan) M Matsuda	2	1
6	(Romania) A Ignatik	6	6

Second round
(Czech Republic) J Malečková	0	1
WC	(Czech Republic) M Kilnarová	6	6
(Brazil) C Alves	1	6^{5}
Q	(South Korea) S-h Park	6	7^{7}
(Italy) M Di Giuseppe	2	6	3
Q	(Czech Republic) T Smitková	6	4	6
Q	(Czech Republic) N Bartůňková
6	(Romania) A Ignatik	w/o

Quarterfinals
WC	(Czech Republic) M Kilnarová	6	7
Q	(South Korea) S-h Park	2	5
Q	(Czech Republic) T Smitková	4	4
6	(Romania) A Ignatik	6	6

Semifinals
WC	(Czech Republic) M Kilnarová	3	2
6	(Romania) A Ignatik	6	6

=== Bottom half ===
First round
7	(Switzerland) S Waltert	6	6
Q	(France) A Ramé	3	3
(Latvia) D Vismane	6	6
Q	(Slovakia) T Mihalíková	3	2
WC	(Czech Republic) L Nosková	5	6	6
(Netherlands) A Hartono	7	3	3
(South Korea) S-j Jang	6	6
4	(Mexico) AS Sánchez	2	1
5	(Brazil) G Cé	7	6^{6}	1
Q	(Venezuela) A Gámiz	5	7^{8}	6
WC	(Czech Republic) D Šalková	7^{7}	6
SE	(Czech Republic) A Sisková	6^{3}	2
Q	(United Kingdom) SB Grey	4	6	6
WC	(Czech Republic) D Viďmanová	6	4	3
LL	(Czech Republic) S Bejlek	6	6
2	(France) D Parry	2	2

Second round
7	(Switzerland) S Waltert	7	4	6
(Latvia) D Vismane	5	6	2
WC	(Czech Republic) L Nosková	6	6
(South Korea) S-j Jang	2	3
Q	(Venezuela) A Gámiz	6^{4}	4
WC	(Czech Republic) D Šalková	7^{7}	6
Q	(United Kingdom) SB Grey	6^{5}	4
LL	(Czech Republic) S Bejlek	7^{7}	6

Quarterfinals
7	(Switzerland) S Waltert	3	3
WC	(Czech Republic) L Nosková	6	6
WC	(Czech Republic) D Šalková	7	6
LL	(Czech Republic) S Bejlek	5	1

Semifinals
WC	(Czech Republic) L Nosková	6	6
WC	(Czech Republic) D Šalková	3	2
