= 2026 US Open – Women's singles qualifying =

Women's singles qualifying
- 2026 US Open

Events
| Singles | men | women | | boys | girls |
| Doubles | men | women | mixed | boys | girls |
| WC Singles | men | women | quad | boys | girls |
| WC Doubles | men | women | quad | boys | girls |

Qualification
| Singles | men | women |
- US Open

The 2026 US Open – Women's singles qualifying is a series of tennis matches that took place from 24 to 28 August 2026 (was originally to end on 27 August, but got rescheduled due to heavy rain) to determine the 16 qualifiers into the main draw of the women's singles tournament.

16 out of the 128 qualifiers who competed in this knock-out tournament secured a main draw place.

This marks the first time 2024 Olympic gold medalist Zheng Qinwen contested a major qualifying competition since the 2022 Australian Open.

== Seeds ==
All seeds are per WTA rankings as of 10 August 2026.

1. (Uzbekistan) Polina Kudermetova (first round)
2. (Japan) Moyuka Uchijima (second round)
3. (United Kingdom) Francesca Jones (qualified)
4. (Latvia) Darja Semeņistaja (qualifying competition, lucky loser)
5. (Armenia) Alina Charaeva (first round)
6. (United States) Claire Liu (first round)
7. (Italy) Lucia Bronzetti (second round)
8. (United States) Elvina Kalieva (qualified)
9. (United States) Kayla Day (first round)
10. (Czech Republic) Laura Samson (first round)
11. (Czech Republic) Dominika Šalková (second round)
12. (Andorra) Victoria Jiménez Kasintseva (first round)
13. (China) Yuan Yue (qualifying competition)
14. (China) Zheng Qinwen (qualified)
15. (Slovakia) Rebecca Šramková (first round)
16. Kristina Liutova (qualfied)
17. (United States) Mary Stoiana (qualified)
18. (Australia) Emerson Jones (first round)
19. (Australia) Maddison Inglis (first round)
20. (Poland) Katarzyna Kawa (first round)
21. (Spain) Marina Bassols Ribera (second round)
22. (Italy) Lisa Pigato (first round)
23. (Japan) Himeno Sakatsume (qualfied)
24. (Ukraine) Veronika Podrez (second round)
25. Aliaksandra Sasnovich (second round)
26. (Belgium) Jeline Vandromme (second round)
27. (Germany) Noma Noha Akugue (first round)
28. (Italy) Lucrezia Stefanini (qualified)
29. (United Kingdom) Harriet Dart (qualified)
30. (France) Fiona Ferro (first round)
31. (Spain) Andrea Lázaro García (qualifying competition)
32. (Spain) Leyre Romero Gormaz (first round)

== Qualifiers ==
1. (United States) Robin Montgomery
2. (Czech Republic) Lucie Havlíčková
3. (United Kingdom) Francesca Jones
4. (Australia) Storm Hunter
5. (Netherlands) Arantxa Rus
6. (United Kingdom) Harriet Dart
7. Polina Iatcenko
8. (United States) Elvina Kalieva
9. (Italy) Lucrezia Stefanini
10. (Slovenia) Tamara Zidanšek
11. (Czech Republic) Gabriela Knutson
12. (Japan) Himeno Sakatsume
13. (United States) Mary Stoiana
14. (China) Zheng Qinwen
15. (Netherlands) Anouk Koevermans
16. Kristina Liutova

== Lucky loser ==
1. (Latvia) Darja Semeņistaja

== Draw ==
Key

- Q = Qualifier
- WC = Wild card
- LL = Lucky loser
- Alt = Alternate
- ITF = ITF entry
- PR = Protected ranking
- SR = Special ranking
- SE = Special exempt
- JE = Junior exempt
- JR = Junior Accelerator Programme entrant
- CO = College Accelerator Programme entrant
- NG = Next Gen Accelerator Program entrant
- w/o = Walkover
- r = Retired
- d = Defaulted

=== First qualifier ===
First round
1 | (Uzbekistan) Polina Kudermetova | 1 | 3
(Czech Republic) Linda Fruhvirtová | 6 | 6
PR | (Canada) Carson Branstine | 6 | 7^{7}
PR | (United States) Clervie Ngounoue | 2 | 6^{3}
(United States) Robin Montgomery | 6 | 6
(Canada) Kayla Cross | 1 | 1
(Belgium) Greet Minnen | 1 | 3
26 | (Belgium) Jeline Vandromme | 6 | 6

Second round
(Czech Republic) Linda Fruhvirtová | 4 | 5
PR | (Canada) Carson Branstine | 6 | 7
(United States) Robin Montgomery | 7 | 6
26 | (Belgium) Jeline Vandromme | 5 | 3

Qualifying competition
PR | (Canada) Carson Branstine | 6 | 2 | 2
(United States) Robin Montgomery | 2 | 6 | 6

=== Second qualifier ===
First round
2 | (Japan) Moyuka Uchijima | 6 | 6
(Slovenia) Polona Hercog | 3 | 3
(Czech Republic) Lucie Havlíčková | 6 | 7
(Bulgaria) Elizara Yaneva | 2 | 5
WC | (United States) Janae Preston | 6^{4} | 1
(Japan) Nao Hibino | 7^{7} | 6
Alt | (Czech Republic) Anna Sisková | 1 | 6 | 7
27 | (Germany) Noma Noha Akugue | 6 | 4 | 5

Second round
2 | (Japan) Moyuka Uchijima | 2 | 6 | 6^{6}
(Czech Republic) Lucie Havlíčková | 6 | 2 | 7^{10}
(Japan) Nao Hibino | 6 | 6
Alt | (Czech Republic) Anna Sisková | 4 | 2

Qualifying competition
(Czech Republic) Lucie Havlíčková | 6 | 6
(Japan) Nao Hibino | 0 | 4

=== Third qualifier ===
First round
3 | (United Kingdom) Francesca Jones | 6 | 6
(Italy) Nuria Brancaccio | 3 | 4
(United States) Whitney Osuigwe | 3 | 5
(Germany) Mona Barthel | 6 | 7
(France) Alice Tubello | 4 | 6 | 2
(Australia) Priscilla Hon | 6 | 4 | 6
(Chinese Taipei) Joanna Garland | 4 | 6 | 7
32 | (Spain) Leyre Romero Gormaz | 6 | 4 | 5

Second round
3 | (United Kingdom) Francesca Jones | 7^{7} | 1 | 6
(Germany) Mona Barthel | 6^{3} | 6 | 2
(Australia) Priscilla Hon | 3 | 4
(Chinese Taipei) Joanna Garland | 6 | 6

Qualifying competition
3 | (United Kingdom) Francesca Jones | 6 | 6
(Chinese Taipei) Joanna Garland | 4 | 1

=== Fourth qualifier ===
First round
4 | (Latvia) Darja Semeņistaja | 6 | 7
(Japan) Hayu Kinoshita | 2 | 5
(Ukraine) Anastasiia Sobolieva | 7^{7} | 1 | 4
Alexandra Shubladze | 6^{0} | 6 | 6
(South Korea) Ku Yeon-woo | 6 | 6
PR | (Australia) Astra Sharma | 4 | 3
(Australia) Storm Hunter | 6 | 6
19 | (Australia) Maddison Inglis | 3 | 0

Second round
4 | (Latvia) Darja Semeņistaja | 7^{7} | 6
Alexandra Shubladze | 6^{5} | 4
(South Korea) Ku Yeon-woo | 6 | 6^{6} | 0
(Australia) Storm Hunter | 4 | 7^{8} | 6

Qualifying competition
4 | (Latvia) Darja Semeņistaja | 4 | 1
(Australia) Storm Hunter | 6 | 6

=== Fifth qualifier ===
First round
5 | (Armenia) Alina Charaeva | 4 | 4
(Switzerland) Susan Bandecchi | 6 | 6
(Slovakia) Viktória Hrunčáková | 6 | 6
(Argentina) Julia Riera | 3 | 4
(Netherlands) Arantxa Rus | 4 | 6 | 6
(Serbia) Teodora Kostović | 6 | 4 | 4
(Netherlands) Suzan Lamens | 7 | 6^{7} | 6
18 | (Australia) Emerson Jones | 5 | 7^{9} | 2

Second round
(Switzerland) Susan Bandecchi | 6 | 6
(Slovakia) Viktória Hrunčáková | 3 | 2
(Netherlands) Arantxa Rus | 6 | 6
(Netherlands) Suzan Lamens | 3 | 4

Qualifying competition
(Switzerland) Susan Bandecchi | 6 | 3 | 4
(Netherlands) Arantxa Rus | 1 | 6 | 6

=== Sixth qualifier ===
First round
6 | (United States) Claire Liu | 6 | 2 | 4
PR | (United Kingdom) Heather Watson | 4 | 6 | 6
(Spain) Ángela Fita Boluda | 6 | 7^{9}
(China) Zhu Lin | 4 | 6^{7}
(United States) Elizabeth Mandlik | 5 | 2
WC | (United States) Kristina Penickova | 7 | 6
WC | (United States) Jordyn Hazelitt | 0 | 7^{7} | 1
29 | (United Kingdom) Harriet Dart | 6 | 6^{1} | 6

Second round
PR | (United Kingdom) Heather Watson | 6 | 5 | 7^{10}
(Spain) Ángela Fita Boluda | 4 | 7 | 6^{5}
WC | (United States) Kristina Penickova | 7 | 0 | 3
29 | (United Kingdom) Harriet Dart | 5 | 6 | 6

Qualifying competition
PR | (United Kingdom) Heather Watson | 6 | 4 | 1
29 | (United Kingdom) Harriet Dart | 2 | 6 | 6

=== Seventh qualifier ===
First round
7 | (Italy) Lucia Bronzetti | 5
(Argentina) Luisina Giovannini | 0^{r}
Polina Iatcenko | 6 | 6
(Czech Republic) Julie Štruplová | 2 | 1
(Japan) Mai Hontama | 7^{7} | 6
(North Macedonia) Lina Gjorcheska | 6^{1} | 3
(Armenia) Elina Avanesyan | 3 | 6^{3}
31 | (Spain) Andrea Lázaro García | 6 | 7^{7}

Second round
7 | (Italy) Lucia Bronzetti | 2 | 6 | 3
Polina Iatcenko | 6 | 3 | 6
(Japan) Mai Hontama | 7 | 6^{6} | 1
31 | (Spain) Andrea Lázaro García | 5 | 7^{8} | 6

Qualifying competition
Polina Iatcenko | 7 | 6
31 | (Spain) Andrea Lázaro García | 5 | 1

=== Eighth qualifier ===
First round
8 | (United States) Elvina Kalieva | 6 | 1 | 6
PR | (France) Kristina Mladenovic | 2 | 6 | 1
(Belgium) Sofia Costoulas | 7 | 6
(Italy) Jennifer Ruggeri | 5 | 4
(Czech Republic) Vendula Valdmannová | 6 | 6
(Argentina) María Lourdes Carlé | 3 | 3
(Hungary) Dalma Gálfi | 6^{5} | 3
25 | Aliaksandra Sasnovich | 7^{7} | 6

Second round
8 | (United States) Elvina Kalieva | 3 | 6 | 6
(Belgium) Sofia Costoulas | 6 | 3 | 4
(Czech Republic) Vendula Valdmannová | 5 | 6 | 6
25 | Aliaksandra Sasnovich | 7 | 3 | 1

Qualifying competition
8 | (United States) Elvina Kalieva | 5 | 6 | 6
(Czech Republic) Vendula Valdmannová | 7 | 4 | 4

=== Ninth qualifier ===
First round
9 | (United States) Kayla Day | 3 | 1
WC | (United States) Julieta Pareja | 6 | 6
(Switzerland) Rebeka Masarova | 4 | 6 | 4
Iryna Shymanovich | 6 | 3 | 6
(United States) Madison Brengle | 6 | 6
Anastasia Gasanova | 4 | 1
(Turkey) Ayla Aksu | 2 | 3
28 | (Italy) Lucrezia Stefanini | 6 | 6

Second round
WC | (United States) Julieta Pareja | 6 | 6
Iryna Shymanovich | 4 | 2
(United States) Madison Brengle | 2 | 3
28 | (Italy) Lucrezia Stefanini | 6 | 6

Qualifying competition
WC | (United States) Julieta Pareja | 4 | 3
28 | (Italy) Lucrezia Stefanini | 6 | 6

=== Tenth qualifier ===
First round
10 | (Czech Republic) Laura Samson | 7^{7} | 4 | 5
(Slovenia) Tamara Zidanšek | 6^{5} | 6 | 7
PR | (United Kingdom) Jodie Burrage | 6^{1} | 4
(Spain) Guiomar Maristany | 7^{7} | 6
(Netherlands) Eva Vedder | 1 | 2
(Canada) Bianca Andreescu | 6 | 6
WC | (United States) Caroline Dolehide | 2 | 6 | 3
24 | (Ukraine) Veronika Podrez | 6 | 0 | 6

Second round
(Slovenia) Tamara Zidanšek | 7 | 6
(Spain) Guiomar Maristany | 5 | 3
(Canada) Bianca Andreescu | 6 | 6
24 | (Ukraine) Veronika Podrez | 0 | 3

Qualifying competition
(Slovenia) Tamara Zidanšek | 2 | 6 | 6
(Canada) Bianca Andreescu | 6 | 3 | 4

=== Eleventh qualifier ===
First round
11 | (Czech Republic) Dominika Šalková | 3 | 6 | 7
(United States) Akasha Urhobo | 6 | 3 | 5
(Czech Republic) Gabriela Knutson | 6 | 7
(United States) Varvara Lepchenko | 1 | 5
(Brazil) Laura Pigossi | 5 | 2
(Greece) Despina Papamichail | 7 | 6
(Georgia (country)) Ekaterine Gorgodze | 3 | 7^{7} | 6
20 | (Poland) Katarzyna Kawa | 6 | 6^{2} | 2

Second round
11 | (Czech Republic) Dominika Šalková | 3 | 1
(Czech Republic) Gabriela Knutson | 6 | 6
(Greece) Despina Papamichail | 6^{3} | 6^{2}
(Georgia (country)) Ekaterine Gorgodze | 7^{7} | 7^{7}

Qualifying competition
(Czech Republic) Gabriela Knutson | 6 | 6
(Georgia (country)) Ekaterine Gorgodze | 4 | 4

=== Twelfth qualifier ===
First round
12 | (Andorra) Victoria Jiménez Kasintseva | 3 | 3
(Portugal) Francisca Jorge | 6 | 6
(Serbia) Mia Ristić | 6 | 1 | 6
WC | (United States) Ayana Akli | 3 | 6 | 4
WC | (United States) Savannah Broadus | 2 | 4
(Italy) Tyra Caterina Grant | 6 | 6
(Argentina) Jazmín Ortenzi | 3 | 1
23 | (Japan) Himeno Sakatsume | 6 | 6

Second round
(Portugal) Francisca Jorge | 1 | 3
(Serbia) Mia Ristić | 6 | 6
(Italy) Tyra Caterina Grant | 7 | 2 | 3
23 | (Japan) Himeno Sakatsume | 5 | 6 | 6

Qualifying competition
(Serbia) Mia Ristić | 4 | 3
23 | (Japan) Himeno Sakatsume | 6 | 6

=== Thirteenth qualifier ===
First round
13 | (China) Yuan Yue | 6 | 6
(China) Guo Hanyu | 2 | 4
Julia Avdeeva | 7^{7} | 6
(Canada) Katherine Sebov | 6^{5} | 1
(United Kingdom) Katie Swan | 6 | 6
WC | (United States) Katrina Scott | 3 | 1
(France) Harmony Tan | 4 | 3
17 | (United States) Mary Stoiana | 6 | 6

Second round
13 | (China) Yuan Yue | 6 | 6
Julia Avdeeva | 3 | 2
(United Kingdom) Katie Swan | 7^{7} | 3 | 3
17 | (United States) Mary Stoiana | 6^{5} | 6 | 6

Qualifying competition
13 | (China) Yuan Yue | 3 | 6 | 4
17 | (United States) Mary Stoiana | 6 | 4 | 6

=== Fourteenth qualifier ===
First round
14 | (China) Zheng Qinwen | 6 | 6
(China) You Xiaodi | 3 | 2
PR | (France) Clara Burel | 6 | 6
(China) Ma Yexin | 4 | 2
Elena Pridankina | 6 | 6
Aliona Falei | 1 | 3
PR | (Canada) Rebecca Marino | 6 | 6
30 | (France) Fiona Ferro | 1 | 4

Second round
14 | (China) Zheng Qinwen | 6 | 7
PR | (France) Clara Burel | 1 | 5
Elena Pridankina | 6 | 6
PR | (Canada) Rebecca Marino | 2 | 4

Qualifying competition
14 | (China) Zheng Qinwen | 6 | 3 | 6
Elena Pridankina | 4 | 6 | 0

=== Fifteenth qualifier ===
First round
15 | (Slovakia) Rebecca Šramková | 2 | 4
Alevtina Ibragimova | 6 | 6
Erika Andreeva | 4 | 6^{5}
PR | (Georgia (country)) Mariam Bolkvadze | 6 | 7^{7}
(Netherlands) Anouk Koevermans | 6 | 7^{7}
(France) Carole Monnet | 4 | 6^{4}
(Poland) Linda Klimovičová | 6 | 6
22 | (Italy) Lisa Pigato | 3 | 3

Second round
Alevtina Ibragimova | 4 | 3
PR | (Georgia (country)) Mariam Bolkvadze | 6 | 6
(Netherlands) Anouk Koevermans | 6 | 7
(Poland) Linda Klimovičová | 3 | 5

Qualifying competition
PR | (Georgia (country)) Mariam Bolkvadze | 3 | 6^{5}
(Netherlands) Anouk Koevermans | 6 | 7^{7}

=== Sixteenth qualifier ===
First round
16 | Kristina Liutova | 6 | 4 | 6
Tatiana Prozorova | 4 | 6 | 2
(Serbia) Lola Radivojević | 6 | 6
(Sweden) Kajsa Rinaldo Persson | 4 | 3
(Poland) Martyna Kubka | 6^{5} | 6 | 6
WC | (United States) Annika Penickova | 7^{7} | 4 | 2
Darya Astakhova | 6 | 6^{0} | 3
21 | (Spain) Marina Bassols Ribera | 4 | 7^{7} | 6

Second round
16 | Kristina Liutova | 6 | 5 | 6
(Serbia) Lola Radivojević | 2 | 7 | 4
(Poland) Martyna Kubka | 6 | 6
21 | (Spain) Marina Bassols Ribera | 3 | 2

Qualifying competition
16 | Kristina Liutova | 6 | 6
(Poland) Martyna Kubka | 4 | 0

== Qualifying wild card challenge ==
The US Open qualifying wild card challenge was a new competition featuring rising American men and women competing for a wild card in the US Open Qualifying Tournament.

The challenge featured four men and four women competing in six total matches — men’s and women’s semifinals and finals — with the winners receiving a wild card into the US Open qualifying event.

=== Wild card challenge seeds ===
1. (United States) Shannon Lam (semifinals)
2. (United States) Chukwumelije Clarke (final)

=== Wild card challenge draw ===
Semifinals
1 | (United States) Shannon Lam | 2 | 6^{2}
(United States) Jordyn Hazelitt | 6 | 7^{7}
(United States) Kennedy Drenser-Hagmann | 3 | 5
2 | (United States) Chukwumelije Clarke | 6 | 7

Final
(United States) Jordyn Hazelitt | 6 | 3 | [10]
2 | (United States) Chukwumelije Clarke | 3 | 6 | [7]
