= 2024 Přerov Cup – Doubles =

Doubles
- 2024 Přerov Cup

Final
- Champions: Elena Pridankina (Czech Republic) Julie Štruplová
- Runners-up: (Germany) Noma Noha Akugue (Greece) Sapfo Sakellaridi
- Score: 6–3, 6–4

Events
Singles	Doubles
← 2023 ·	Přerov Cup	· 2025 →

Sapfo Sakellaridi and Anna Sisková were the defending champions but Sisková chose to compete in Cleveland instead.

Sakellaridi partnered alongside Noma Noha Akugue, but they lost in the final to Elena Pridankina and Julie Štruplová, 3–6, 4–6.

== Seeds ==
1. (Italy) Camilla Rosatello / (Belgium) Kimberley Zimmermann (quarterfinals)
2. Amina Anshba / (Czech Republic) Anastasia Dețiuc (first round)
3. (Czech Republic) Jesika Malečková / (Czech Republic) Miriam Škoch (first round)
4. (United Kingdom) Freya Christie / (Colombia) Yuliana Lizarazo (first round)

== Draw ==
=== Key ===
- Q = Qualifier
- WC = Wild card
- LL = Lucky loser
- Alt = Alternate
- SE = Special exempt
- PR = Protected ranking
- ITF = ITF entry
- JE = Junior exempt
- w/o = Walkover
- r = Retired
- d = Defaulted
- SR = Special ranking

First round
1	(Italy) C Rosatello (Belgium) K Zimmermann	6	6
(Spain) Y Cavallé Reimers (Mexico) M Portillo Ramírez	4	4
(Czech Republic) A Laboutková (Slovakia) S Milatová	3	4
(Germany) N Noha Akugue (Greece) S Sakellaridi	6	6
4	(United Kingdom) F Christie (Colombia) Y Lizarazo	6	5	[4]
WC	(Czech Republic) T Krejčová (Czech Republic) J Paštiková	4	7	[10]
WC	(Czech Republic) V Huťková (Czech Republic) A Jelínková	2	1
(Spain) I Burillo Escorihuela (Slovakia) N Vargová	6	6
(Greece) E Christofi (Bosnia and Herzegovina) A Wagner	6^{7}	6^{5}
WC	(Czech Republic) A Kovačková (Czech Republic) E Ticháčková	7^{9}	7^{7}
(Spain) Á Fita Boluda (Switzerland) Y In-Albon	6	5	[10]
3	(Czech Republic) J Malečková (Czech Republic) M Škoch	3	7	[8]
(United Kingdom) A Barnett (Netherlands) I Haverlag	7^{7}	6
(Czech Republic) A Kučmová (Croatia) T Würth	6^{4}	1
E Pridankina (Czech Republic) J Štruplová	7^{7}	6
2	A Anshba (Czech Republic) A Dețiuc	6^{5}	1

Quarterfinals
1	(Italy) C Rosatello (Belgium) K Zimmermann	6	4	[4]
(Germany) N Noha Akugue (Greece) S Sakellaridi	4	6	[10]
WC	(Czech Republic) T Krejčová (Czech Republic) J Paštiková	2	6	[10]
(Spain) I Burillo Escorihuela (Slovakia) N Vargová	6	4	[8]
WC	(Czech Republic) A Kovačková (Czech Republic) E Ticháčková	2	5
(Spain) Á Fita Boluda (Switzerland) Y In-Albon	6	7
(United Kingdom) A Barnett (Netherlands) I Haverlag	4	6	[3]
E Pridankina (Czech Republic) J Štruplová	6	4	[10]

Semifinals
(Germany) N Noha Akugue (Greece) S Sakellaridi	6	4	[10]
WC	(Czech Republic) T Krejčová (Czech Republic) J Paštiková	3	6	[5]
(Spain) Á Fita Boluda (Switzerland) Y In-Albon	5	3
E Pridankina (Czech Republic) J Štruplová	7	6

Final
(Germany) N Noha Akugue (Greece) S Sakellaridi	3	4
E Pridankina (Czech Republic) J Štruplová	6	6
