= 2021 Zubr Cup – Doubles =

Doubles
- 2021 Zubr Cup

Final
- Champions: (Brazil) Carolina Alves (United Kingdom) Sarah Beth Grey
- Runners-up: (Japan) Mana Kawamura (Japan) Funa Kozaki
- Score: 6–4, 3–6, [13–11]

Events
Singles	Doubles
← 2020 ·	Zubr Cup	· 2022 →

Chantal Škamlová and Tereza Smitková were the defending champions but Škamlová chose not to participate. Smitková played alongside Tereza Mihalíková, but lost in the first round to Lara Salden and Daniela Vismane.

Carolina Alves and Sarah Beth Grey won the title, defeating Mana Kawamura and Funa Kozaki in the final, 6–4, 3–6, [13–11].

== Seeds ==
1. (Czech Republic) Anastasia Dețiuc / (Venezuela) Andrea Gámiz (semifinals)
2. (Japan) Kanako Morisaki / (Japan) Erika Sema (quarterfinals)
3. (Brazil) Carolina Alves / (United Kingdom) Sarah Beth Grey (champions)
4. (Mexico) Ana Sofía Sánchez / (Russia) Anastasia Zakharova (withdrew)

== Draw ==
=== Key ===
- Q = Qualifier
- WC = Wild card
- LL = Lucky loser
- Alt = Alternate
- SE = Special exempt
- PR = Protected ranking
- ITF = ITF entry
- JE = Junior exempt
- w/o = Walkover
- r = Retired
- d = Defaulted
- SR = Special ranking

=== Draw ===
First round
1	(Czech Republic) A Dețiuc (Venezuela) A Gámiz	6	7
(Australia) A Bozovic (Australia) A Parnaby	4	5
WC	(Czech Republic) D Šalková (Czech Republic) D Viďmanová	2	6	[8]
WC	(Czech Republic) K Kubáňová (Czech Republic) N Tomanová	6	4	[10]
3	(Brazil) C Alves (United Kingdom) SB Grey	6	6
WC	(Czech Republic) A Laboutková (Czech Republic) L Nosková	4	4
(Czech Republic) D Hindová (Czech Republic) J Marková	2	6^{1}
(Netherlands) I Haverlag (Romania) A Ignatik	6	7^{7}
(Croatia) M Dražić (Croatia) T Lukas	2	2
(Latvia) K Bartone (Germany) A Zaja	6	6
(United Kingdom) E Appleton (Netherlands) A Hartono	2	2
Alt	(Japan) M Kawamura (Japan) F Kozaki	6	6
(Slovakia) T Mihalíková (Czech Republic) T Smitková	6	5	[6]
(Belgium) L Salden (Latvia) D Vismane	3	7	[10]
(South Korea) S-h Park (Bulgaria) G Topalova	5	2
2	(Japan) K Morisaki (Japan) E Sema	7	6

Quarterfinals
1	(Czech Republic) A Dețiuc (Venezuela) A Gámiz	6	6
WC	(Czech Republic) K Kubáňová (Czech Republic) N Tomanová	1	4
3	(Brazil) C Alves (United Kingdom) SB Grey	6	6
(Netherlands) I Haverlag (Romania) A Ignatik	1	2
(Latvia) K Bartone (Germany) A Zaja	7^{9}	1	[5]
Alt	(Japan) M Kawamura (Japan) F Kozaki	6^{7}	6	[10]
(Belgium) L Salden (Latvia) D Vismane	7^{7}	6
2	(Japan) K Morisaki (Japan) E Sema	6^{5}	2

Semifinals
1	(Czech Republic) A Dețiuc (Venezuela) A Gámiz	4	5
3	(Brazil) C Alves (United Kingdom) SB Grey	6	7
Alt	(Japan) M Kawamura (Japan) F Kozaki	6	2	[10]
(Belgium) L Salden (Latvia) D Vismane	4	6	[5]

Final
3	(Brazil) C Alves (United Kingdom) SB Grey	6	3	[13]
Alt	(Japan) M Kawamura (Japan) F Kozaki	4	6	[11]
