= Elizara Yaneva =

Bulgarian tennis player (born 2007)

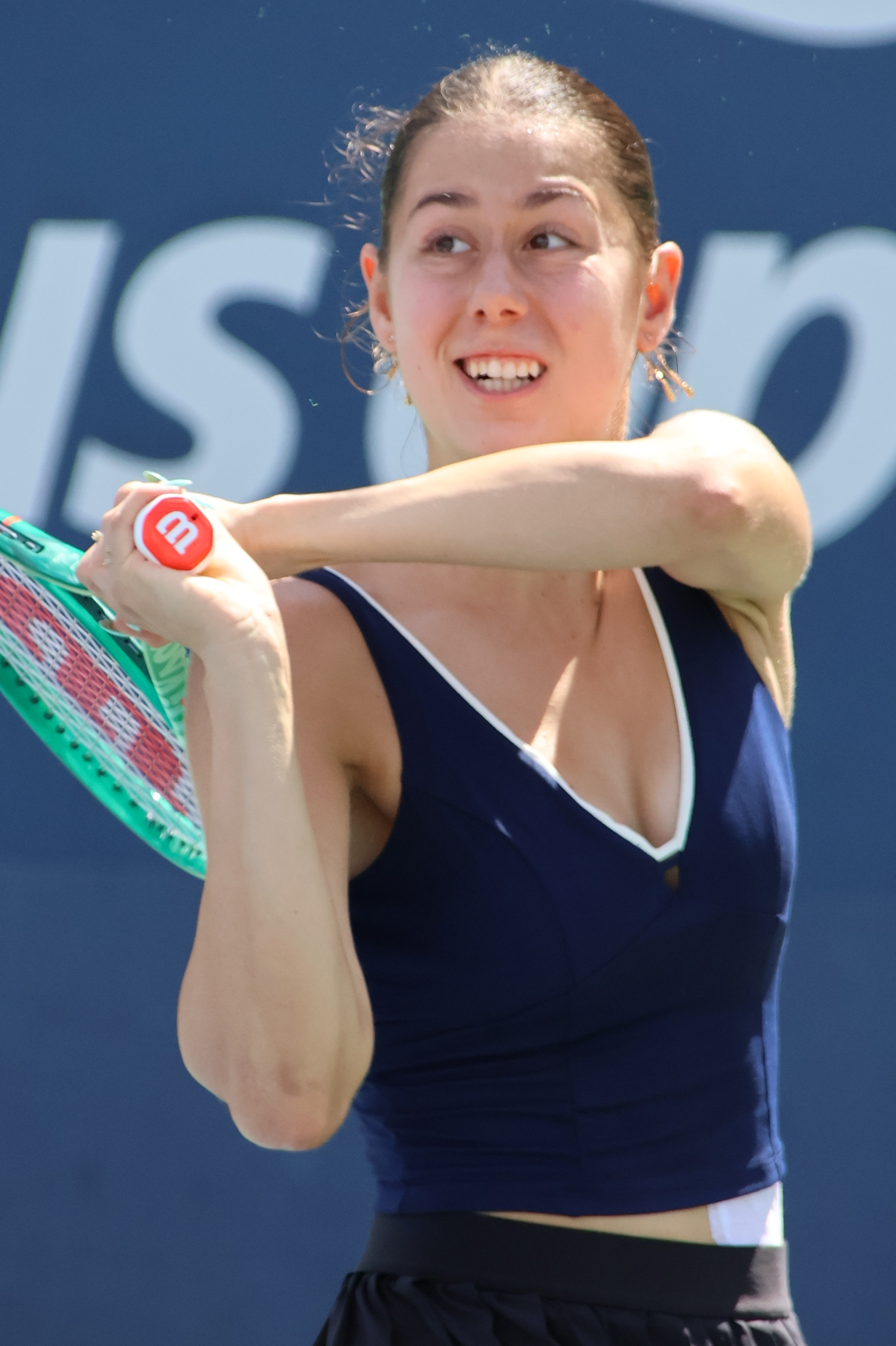
- Yaneva at the 2026 US Open
- Country (sports): Bulgaria
- Born: 21 March 2007 (age 19) Plovdiv, Bulgaria
- Turned pro: 2022
- Plays: Right (two-handed backhand)
- Prize money: $181,445

Singles
- Career record: 85–46
- Career titles: 5 ITF
- Highest ranking: No. 138 (2 November 2026)
- Current ranking: No. 139 (9 November 2026)

Grand Slam singles results
- French Open: Q1 (2026)
- Wimbledon: Q2 (2026)
- US Open: Q1 (2026)

Doubles
- Career record: 11–10
- Career titles: 1 ITF
- Highest ranking: No. 661 (4 May 2026)
- Current ranking: No. 923 (2 November 2026)
- Last updated on: 10 November 2026.

Elizara Yaneva (Bulgarian: Елизара Янева) (born 21 March 2007) is a Bulgarian tennis player. She has a career-high singles ranking of No. 138 by the WTA, achieved on 2 November 2026.

== Career ==
=== Juniors ===
In 2024, she triumphed at both the J500 Mérida and the J300 Vrsar and reached the final of the Orange Bowl in the United States. That April, she also reached the final of the J300 Plovdiv Cup, losing to compatriot Rositsa Dencheva in the final despite having not lost a set prior to the final. She finished 2024 taking part on the Grand Slam Player Development Programme.

Playing in the junior majors in 2025, she and Dencheva reached the girls' doubles quarterfinals of the Australian Open, before losing to eventual champions, Annika and Kristina Penickova. She reached the second round of the girls' singles at the 2025 French Open. She played in the girls' doubles competition at the 2025 US Open, alongside Ksenia Efremova of France.

=== Professional ===
Yaneva won her first title in February 2025 in Manacor, Spain on the W15 level. In September 2025 , she won the W50 tournament in Pazardzhik, Bulgaria, defeating third seed Séléna Janicijevic of France in the final.

== ITF World Tour finals ==
=== Singles: 10 (5 titles, 5 runner-ups) ===
Legend W75 tournaments (1–1) W50 tournaments (2–4) W15 tournaments (2–0)	Finals by surface Hard (3–4) Clay (2–1)

Result	W–L	Date	Tournament	Tier	Surface	Opponent	Score
Win	1–0	Feb 2025	ITF Manacor, Spain	W15	Hard	(France) Astrid Lew Yan Foon	5–1 ret.
Win	2–0	Feb 2025	ITF Manacor, Spain	W15	Hard	(Netherlands) Britt Du Pree	2–6, 6–4, 6–3
Win	3–0	Sep 2025	Pazardzhik Cup, Bulgaria	W50+H	Clay	(France) Séléna Janicijevic	7–5, 6–3
Loss	3–1	Nov 2025	Trnava Indoor, Slovakia	W50	Hard (i)	(Czech Republic) Lucie Havlíčková	4–6, 6–3, 6–7^{(3)}
Loss	3–2	Jan 2026	ITF Manchester, United Kingdom	W50	Hard (i)	(Switzerland) Céline Naef	6–4, 1–6, 4–6
Loss	3–3	Feb 2026	Porto Indoor, Portugal	W75	Hard (i)	(Turkey) Ayla Aksu	5–7, 4–6
Loss	3–4	Feb 2026	Porto Indoor 2, Portugal	W50	Hard (i)	(United States) Fiona Crawley	7–6^{(4)}, 3–6, 4–6
Win	4–4	Sep 2026	Pazardzhik Cup, Bulgaria	W50	Clay	(Netherlands) Loes Ebeling Koning	6–3, 6–7^{(1)}, 7–6^{(5)}
Loss	4–5	Sep 2026	ITF Plovdiv, Bulgaria	W50	Clay	(Spain) Ane Mintegi del Olmo	6–2, 1–6, 3–6
Win	5–5	Nov 2026	Trnava Indoor, Slovakia	W75	Hard (i)	(United Kingdom) Mika Stojsavljevic	7-6^{(1)}, 6-3

=== Doubles: 1 (title) ===
Legend W35 tournaments	Finals by surface Clay (1–0)

Result	W–L	Date	Tournament	Tier	Surface	Partner	Opponents	Score
Win	1–0	Oct 2025	ITF Santa Margherita di Pula, Italy	W35	Clay	(Serbia) Anja Stanković	(Italy) Eleonora Alvisi (Italy) Gaia Maduzzi	7–5, 6–4

== National representation ==
=== Billie Jean King Cup ===
Yaneva debuted in Bulgaria Billie Jean King Cup team in 2026; since then she has accumulated a win–loss record of 4–0 in singles and 3–0 in doubles (7–0 overall).

==== Singles (4–0) ====
Edition	Round	Date	Location	Against	Surface	Opponent	W/L	Result
2026	Z2 RR	6 Apr 2026	Banja Luka (BIH)	South Africa	Clay	Jahnie van Zyl	W	6–0, 6–4
2026	Z2 RR	7 Apr 2026	Banja Luka (BIH)	Morocco	Clay	Yasmine Kabbaj	W	6–4, 6–1
2026	Z2 RR	10 Apr 2026	Banja Luka (BIH)	Egypt	Clay	Sandra Samir	W	6–4, 6–1
2026	Z2 PO	11 Apr 2026	Banja Luka (BIH)	Cyprus	Clay	Andrea Georgiou Papakyriacou	W	6–0, 6–2

==== Doubles (3–0) ====
Edition	Round	Date	Location	Partner	Surface	Against	Opponents	W/L	Result
2026	Z2 RR	6 Apr 2026	Banja Luka (BIH)	Lidia Encheva	Clay	South Africa	Allegra van der Walt; Jahnie van Zyl	W	6–3, 6–3
2026	Z2 RR	8 Apr 2026	Banja Luka (BIH)	Rositsa Dencheva	Clay	North Macedonia	Jana Bozinovska; Ana Mitevska	W	6–0, 6–4
2026	Z2 RR	10 Apr 2026	Banja Luka (BIH)	Rositsa Dencheva	Clay	Egypt	Yasmin Ezzat; Nada Fouat	W	6–2, 6–3
