= 2022 Zubr Cup – Doubles =

Doubles
- 2022 Zubr Cup

Final
- Champions: (Czech Republic) Anastasia Dețiuc (Czech Republic) Miriam Kolodziejová
- Runners-up: (Japan) Funa Kozaki (Japan) Misaki Matsuda
- Score: 7–6^{(7–4)}, 4–6, [10–5]

Events
Singles	Doubles
← 2021 ·	Zubr Cup	· 2023 →

Carolina Alves and Sarah Beth Grey were the defending champions but chose not to participate.

Anastasia Dețiuc and Miriam Kolodziejová won the title after defeating Funa Kozaki and Misaki Matsuda 7–6^{(7–4)}, 4–6, [10–5] in the final.

== Seeds ==
1. (Venezuela) Andrea Gámiz / (Netherlands) Eva Vedder (first round)
2. (Czech Republic) Anastasia Dețiuc / (Czech Republic) Miriam Kolodziejová (champions)
3. (Lithuania) Justina Mikulskytė / (Serbia) Natalija Stevanović (semifinals)
4. (Spain) Ángela Fita Boluda / (Italy) Angelica Moratelli (quarterfinals)

== Draw ==
=== Key ===
- Q = Qualifier
- WC = Wild card
- LL = Lucky loser
- Alt = Alternate
- SE = Special exempt
- PR = Protected ranking
- ITF = ITF entry
- JE = Junior exempt
- w/o = Walkover
- r = Retired
- d = Defaulted
- SR = Special ranking

First round
1	(Venezuela) A Gámiz (Netherlands) E Vedder	3	2
(Spain) I Burillo Escorihuela (Italy) A Zantedeschi	6	6
(Romania) O Gavrilă (Czech Republic) J Marková	4	0^{r}
(Spain) Y Cavallé Reimers (Spain) R Vicens Mas	6	0
4	(Spain) Á Fita Boluda (Italy) A Moratelli	4	6	[11]
(North Macedonia) L Gjorcheska (Germany) K Hobgarski	6	3	[9]
(Japan) F Kozaki (Japan) M Matsuda	6	6
WC	(Czech Republic) L Klimovičová (Czech Republic) D Šalková	3	1
Alt	(Czech Republic) N Bartůňková (Czech Republic) B Palicová	4	2
(Spain) G Maristany (Chile) D Seguel	6	6
(France) C Monnet (Burundi) S Nahimana	4	3
3	(Lithuania) J Mikulskytė (Serbia) N Stevanović	6	6
(Australia) A Osborne (Latvia) D Vismane	6	4	[12]
Alt	(Romania) IG Ghioroaie (Romania) OG Simion	4	6	[10]
WC	(Czech Republic) A Moravcová (Czech Republic) D Pospíšilová	2	3
2	(Czech Republic) A Dețiuc (Czech Republic) M Kolodziejová	6	6

Quarterfinals
(Spain) I Burillo Escorihuela (Italy) A Zantedeschi	6	6
(Spain) Y Cavallé Reimers (Spain) R Vicens Mas	2	3
4	(Spain) Á Fita Boluda (Italy) A Moratelli	2	3
(Japan) F Kozaki (Japan) M Matsuda	6	6
(Spain) G Maristany (Chile) D Seguel	3	2
3	(Lithuania) J Mikulskytė (Serbia) N Stevanović	6	6
(Australia) A Osborne (Latvia) D Vismane	2	4
2	(Czech Republic) A Dețiuc (Czech Republic) M Kolodziejová	6	6

Semifinals
(Spain) I Burillo Escorihuela (Italy) A Zantedeschi	4	4
(Japan) F Kozaki (Japan) M Matsuda	6	6
3	(Lithuania) J Mikulskytė (Serbia) N Stevanović	1	6^{7}
2	(Czech Republic) A Dețiuc (Czech Republic) M Kolodziejová	6	7^{9}

Final
(Japan) F Kozaki (Japan) M Matsuda	6^{4}	6	[5]
2	(Czech Republic) A Dețiuc (Czech Republic) M Kolodziejová	7^{7}	4	[10]
