= Kristina Dmitruk =

Belarusian tennis player (born 2003)

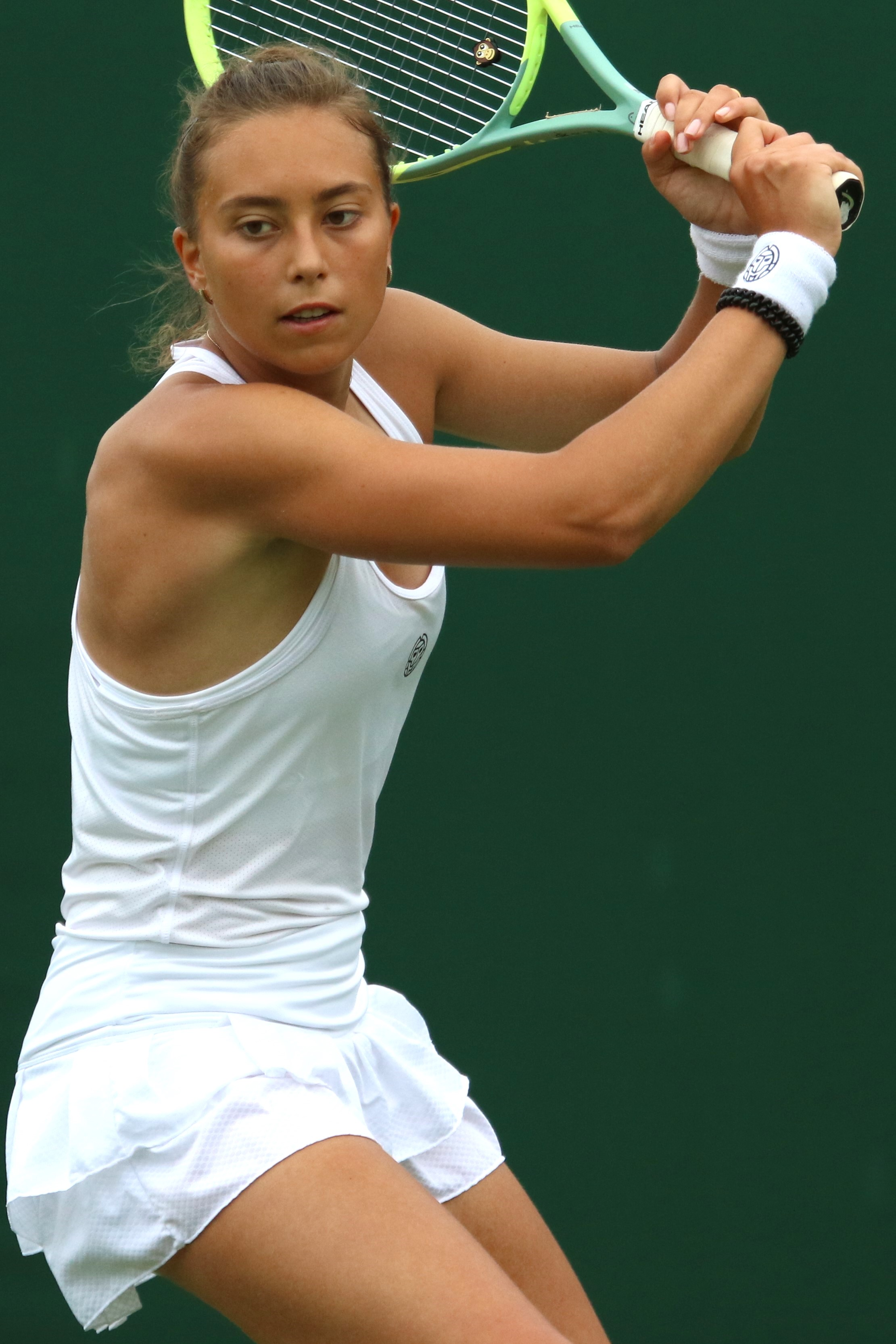
- Dmitruk at the 2023 Wimbledon Championships
- Country (sports): Belarus
- Born: 25 September 2003 (age 23)
- Plays: Right (two-handed backhand)
- Coach: Bogdan Dzudzewicz
- Prize money: US$ 251,426

Singles
- Career record: 140–82
- Career titles: 6 ITF
- Highest ranking: No. 196 (9 June 2025)
- Current ranking: No. 499 (25 May 2026)

Grand Slam singles results
- French Open: Q3 (2025)
- Wimbledon: Q1 (2023, 2025)
- US Open: Q2 (2025)

Doubles
- Career record: 38–26
- Career titles: 4 ITF
- Highest ranking: No. 474 (17 July 2023)
- Current ranking: No. 1041 (25 May 2026)
- Last updated on: 5 June 2026.

Kristina Dmitruk (born 25 September 2003) is a Belarusian professional tennis player. She has a career-high singles ranking by the WTA of 196, achieved in June 2025. She won the Wimbledon girls' doubles title in 2021. Dmitruk has won ten tournaments on the ITF Women's World Tennis Tour, six in singles.

== Juniors ==
Dmitruk won the girls' doubles title at the 2021 Wimbledon Championships. She was runner-up in the girls' singles at the 2021 US Open, losing to Robin Montgomery in the final.

=== Grand Slam performance ===
Singles:

- Australian Open: –
- French Open: QF (2020)
- Wimbledon: QF (2021)
- US Open: F (2021)

Doubles:

- Australian Open: –
- French Open: QF (2020)
- Wimbledon: W (2021)
- US Open: QF (2021)

== Professional ==
Dmitruk received a wildcard entry into the WTA 125 2023 Makarska International Championships, defeating Natália Szabanin to reach the second round where she lost to third seed and eventual champion Mayar Sherif.

Again entering as a wildcard, she played her second WTA 125 tournament at the 2024 Montreux Open but went out in the first round to lucky loser Carole Monnet in three sets. A week later, once more as a wildcard, at the Ljubljana Open, Dmitruk reached the quarterfinals with wins over Tena Lukas and fourth seed Sára Bejlek, before losing to eventual champion, Jil Teichmann, in a match which went to a deciding set tiebreak.

== ITF Circuit finals ==
=== Singles: 13 (6 titles, 7 runner-ups) ===
Legend W75 tournaments W50 tournaments W25 tournaments W15 tournaments	Legend Hard (5–4) Clay (1–3)

Result	W–L	Date	Tournament	Tier	Surface	Opponent	Score
Loss	0–1	May 2021	ITF Shymkent, Kazakhstan	W15	Clay	(Kazakhstan) Zhibek Kulambayeva	5–7, 0–6
Win	1–1	Feb 2022	ITF Monastir, Tunisia	W15	Hard	(Switzerland) Valentina Ryser	6–2, 6–1
Loss	1–2	May 2022	ITF Tbilisi, Georgia	W25	Hard	(United Kingdom) Anna Brogan	3–6, 3–6
Loss	1–3	Jun 2022	ITF Tbilisi, Georgia	W25	Hard	(Russia) Anastasia Zakharova	4–6, 0–6
Win	2–3	Aug 2022	ITF Ourense, Spain	W25	Hard	(Bosnia and Herzegovina) Nefisa Berberović	7–5, 6–1
Loss	2–4	Jan 2023	ITF Monastir, Tunisia	W25	Hard	(France) Océane Dodin	1–6, 1–6
Loss	2–5	Jul 2023	ITF Klosters, Switzerland	W25	Clay	(Germany) Lara Schmidt	3–6, 2–6
Win	3–5	Aug 2024	ITF Mohammedia, Morocco	W35	Clay	(Turkey) Çağla Büyükakçay	6–3, 6–7^{(5)}, 6–3
Loss	3–6	Aug 2024	Přerov Cup, Czech Republic	W75	Clay	(Germany) Noma Noha Akugue	2–6, 6–3, 1–6
Win	4–6	Oct 2024	ITF Quinta do Lago, Portugal	W50	Hard	(France) Yasmine Mansouri	6–4, 6–3
Win	5–6	Nov 2024	ITF Funchal, Portugal	W50	Hard	(Malta) Francesca Curmi	6–1, 3–2 ret.
Win	6–6	Mar 2025	ITF Gurgaon, India	W35	Hard	(Russia) Ekaterina Makarova	6–3, 6–2
Loss	6–7	Jan 2026	ITF Monastir, Tunisia	W15	Hard	(Italy) Samira de Stefano	4–6, 4–6

=== Doubles: 7 (4 titles, 3 runner-ups) ===
Legend W75 tournaments W25 tournaments W15 tournaments	Legend Hard (3–2) Clay (1–1)

Result	W–L	Date	Tournament	Tier	Surface	Partner	Opponents	Score
Win	1–0	May 2021	ITF Antalya, Turkey	W15	Clay	(Italy) Federica Bilardo	(United Kingdom) Matilda Mutavdzic (Croatia) Antonia Ružić	6–3, 0–6, [10–7]
Loss	1–1	Feb 2022	ITF Monastir, Tunisia	W15	Hard	(Algeria) Inès Ibbou	(Japan) Miyu Kato (Japan) Kisa Yoshioka	4–6, 5–7
Win	2–1	Feb 2022	ITF Monastir, Tunisia	W15	Hard	(Russia) Maria Sholokhova	(Belgium) Sofia Costoulas (United States) Clervie Ngounoue	3–6, 6–2, [10–5]
Win	3–1	Jan 2023	ITF Monastir, Tunisia	W25	Hard	(Belarus) Iryna Shymanovich	(Germany) Kathleen Kanev (Switzerland) Arlinda Rushiti	6–1, 6–2
Loss	3–2	Jul 2023	ITF Klosters, Switzerland	W25	Clay	(India) Prarthana Thombare	(Switzerland) Paula Cembranos (Switzerland) Sophie Luescher	6–7^{(5)}, 6–3, [12–14]
Loss	3–3	Mar 2025	Jin'an Open, China	W75	Hard	(Russia) Kira Pavlova	(Indonesia) Priska Madelyn Nugroho (India) Ankita Raina	0–6, 3–6
Win	4–3	Jan 2026	ITF Monastir, Tunisia	W15	Hard	(Belarus) Daria Khomutsianskaya	(France) Yasmine Mansouri (Serbia) Elena Milovanović	7–5, 7–5

=== Junior Grand Slam tournament finals ===
==== Singles: 1 (runner-up) ====
Result	Year	Tournament	Surface	Opponent	Score
Loss	2021	US Open	Hard	(United States) Robin Montgomery	2–6, 4–6

==== Doubles: 1 (title) ====
Result	Year	Tournament	Surface	Partner	Opponents	Score
Win	2021	Wimbledon	Grass	(Russia) Diana Shnaider	(Belgium) Sofia Costoulas (Finland) Laura Hietaranta	6–1, 6–2
