= Noma Noha Akugue =

German tennis player

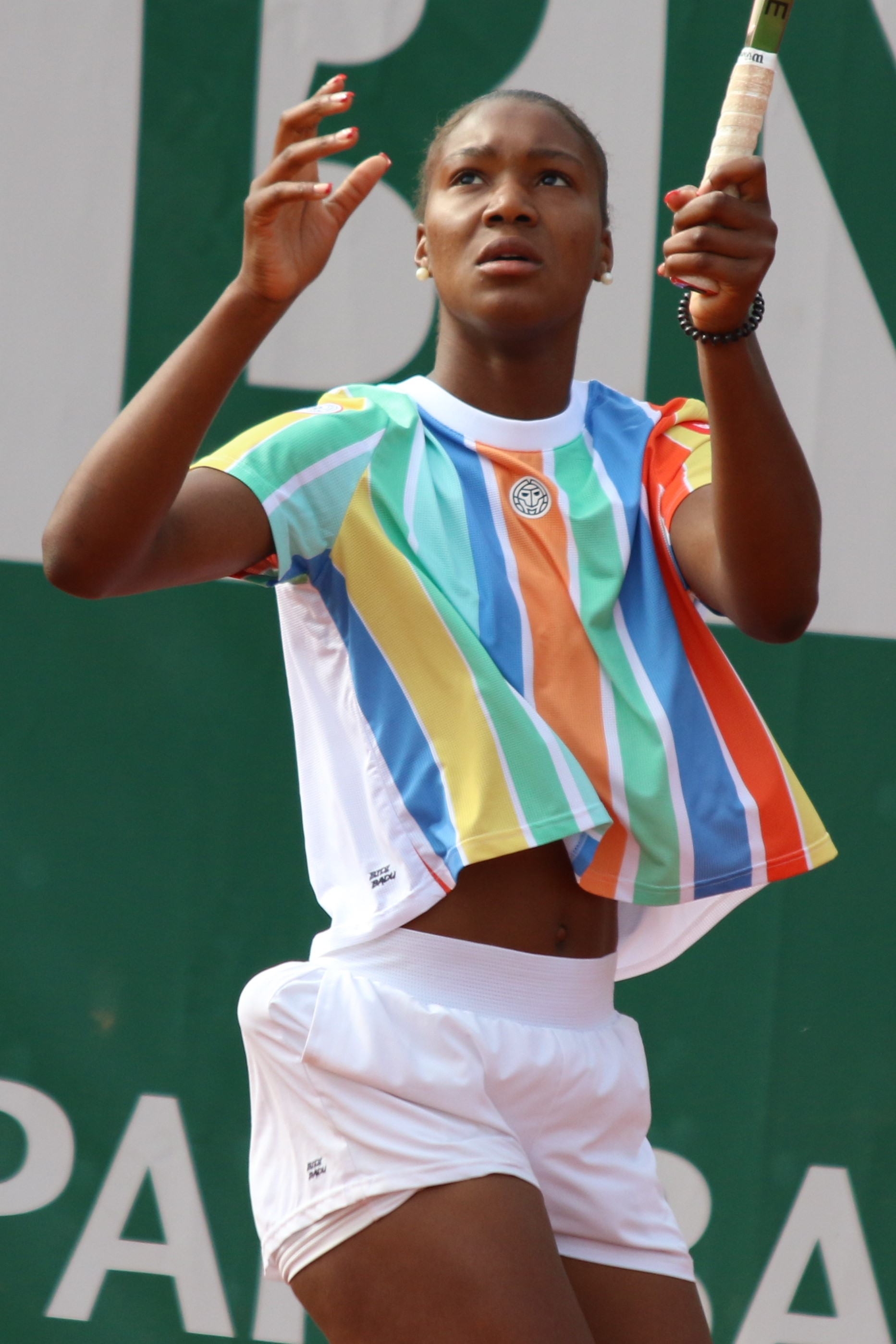
- Noha Akugue at the 2023 French Open
- Country (sports): Germany
- Residence: Glinde, Germany
- Born: 2 December 2003 (age 22) Reinbek, Germany
- Height: 1.70 m (5 ft 7 in)
- Plays: Left-handed (two-handed backhand)
- Prize money: $610,929

Singles
- Career record: 212–154
- Career titles: 6 ITF
- Highest ranking: No. 112 (9 November 2026)
- Current ranking: No. 112 (9 November 2026)

Grand Slam singles results
- Australian Open: Q1 (2024, 2025)
- French Open: Q2 (2023, 2024, 2026)
- Wimbledon: Q2 (2023, 2026)
- US Open: Q1 (2023, 2026)

Doubles
- Career record: 70–62
- Career titles: 3 ITF
- Highest ranking: No. 169 (7 April 2025)
- Current ranking: No. 353 (9 November 2026)
- Last updated on: 9 November 2026.

Noma Noha Akugue (born 2 December 2003) is a German professional tennis player.

Noha Akugue has a career-high singles ranking of world No. 112, achieved on 9 November 2026, and a best WTA doubles ranking of No. 169, reached on 7 April 2025.

== Career ==
=== 2021–2022: WTA Tour debut ===
She made her WTA Tour main-draw debut at the 2021 Porsche Tennis Grand Prix in Stuttgart, partnering Julia Middendorf in the doubles competition.

=== 2023: Maiden WTA Tour final ===
In singles, she made her WTA Tour main-draw debut as a wildcard player at the 2023 Hamburg European Open and reached the final by winning her first four matches on the WTA Tour, defeating Laura Pigossi, Storm Hunter, Martina Trevisan and Diana Shnaider en route. In the final, she lost to Arantxa Rus in two sets.

== Performance timelines ==
Key
W	F	SF	QF	#R	RR	Q#	DNQ	A	NH

(W) winner; (F) finalist; (SF) semifinalist; (QF) quarterfinalist; (#R) rounds 4, 3, 2, 1; (RR) round-robin stage; (Q#) qualification round; (DNQ) did not qualify; (A) absent; (NH) not held; (SR) strike rate (events won / competed); (W–L) win–loss record.
To avoid confusion and double counting, these charts are updated at the conclusion of a tournament or when the player's participation has ended.

Only main-draw results in WTA Tour, Grand Slam tournaments, Billie Jean King Cup (play-offs or higher) and Olympic Games are included in win–loss records.

=== Singles ===
Current through the 2026 WTA Tour.

Tournament	2022	2023	2024	2025	2026	SR	W–L
Grand Slam tournaments
Australian Open	A	A	Q1	Q1	A	0 / 0	0–0
French Open	A	Q2	Q2	A	Q2	0 / 0	0–0
Wimbledon	A	Q2	Q1	A	Q2	0 / 0	0–0
US Open	A	Q1	A	A	Q1	0 / 0	0–0
Win–Loss	0–0	0–0	0–0	0–0	0–0	0 / 0	0–0
National representation
BJK Cup	A	A	A	A	Z1	0 / 0	3–1
Career statistics
Tournaments	0	2	2	1	2	7	
Titles	0	0	0	0	0	0	
Finals	0	1	0	0	0	1	
Overall win–loss	0–0	4–2	1–2	0–1	1–2	6–7	
Year-end ranking	258	171	212	306	112		

=== Doubles ===
Current through the 2026 WTA Tour.

Tournament	2021	2022	2023	2024	2025	2026	SR	W–L
Grand Slam tournaments
Australian Open	A	A	A	A	A	A	0 / 0	0–0
French Open	A	A	A	A	A	A	0 / 0	0–0
Wimbledon	A	A	A	A	A	A	0 / 0	0–0
US Open	A	A	A	A	A	A	0 / 0	0–0
Win–Loss	0–0	0–0	0–0	0–0	0–0	0–0	0 / 0	0–0
National representation
BJK Cup	A	A	A	A	A	Z1	0 / 0	0–2
Career statistics
Tournaments	3	0	2	1	1	2	9	
Overall win–loss	0–3	0–0	2–1	1–1	0–1	0–2	3–8	
Year-end ranking	865	435	279	195	226	351		

== WTA Tour finals ==
=== Singles: 1 (runner-up) ===
Legend WTA 1000 (–) WTA 500 (–) WTA 250 (0–1)	Finals by surface Hard (–) Clay (0–1)

Result	W–L	Date	Tournament	Tier	Surface	Opponent	Score
Loss	0–1	Jul 2023	Hamburg Open, Germany	WTA 250	Clay	(Netherlands) Arantxa Rus	0–6, 6–7^{(3–7)}

== WTA Challenger finals ==
=== Singles: 2 (2 runner-ups) ===
Result	W–L	Date	Tournament	Surface	Opponent	Score
Loss	0–1	Sep 2026	Montreux Ladies Open, Switzerland	Clay	(France) Fiona Ferro	1–6, 2–6
Loss	0–2	Nov 2026	Courmayeur Ladies Open, Italy	Hard (i)	(Armenia) Alina Charaeva	3–6, 4–6

=== Doubles: 1 (runner-up) ===
Result	W–L	Date	Tournament	Surface	Partner	Opponents	Score
Loss	0–1	Oct 2025	Mallorca Championships, Spain	Clay	(Germany) Mariella Thamm	(Czech Republic) Jesika Malečková (Czech Republic) Miriam Škoch	4–6, 0–6

== ITF Circuit finals ==
=== Singles: 16 (6 titles, 10 runner-ups) ===
Legend W100 tournaments (1–0) W60/75 tournaments (2–3) W50 tournaments (2–1) W25/35 tournaments (0–4) W15 tournaments (1–2)	Finals by surface Hard (1–4) Clay (4–6) Carpet (1–0)

Result	W–L	Date	Tournament	Tier	Surface	Opponent	Score
Loss	0–1	Aug 2020	ITF Alkmaar, Netherlands	W15	Clay	(Netherlands) Cindy Burger	1–6, 4–6
Win	1–1	May 2022	ITF Cairo, Egypt	W15	Clay	(Chinese Taipei) Yang Ya-yi	6–1, 6–1
Loss	1–2	May 2022	ITF Cairo, Egypt	W15	Clay	(Slovakia) Barbora Matúsová	2–6, 5–7
Loss	1–3	Aug 2022	Ladies Open Hechingen, Germany	W60	Clay	(Croatia) Lea Bošković	5–7, 6–3, 4–6
Loss	1–4	Aug 2022	ITF Braunschweig, Germany	W25	Clay	(Czech Republic) Brenda Fruhvirtová	3–6, 1–6
Loss	1–5	Sep 2022	Prague Open, Czech Republic	W60	Clay	(Hungary) Réka Luca Jani	3–6, 6–7^{(4–7)}
Loss	1–6	Oct 2022	ITF Pula, Italy	W25	Clay	(Switzerland) Ylena In-Albon	3–6, 2–6
Loss	1–7	Nov 2022	ITF Kiryat Motzkin, Israel	W25	Hard	Anna Kubareva	6–7^{(5–7)}, 7–5, 5–7
Loss	1–8	Feb 2024	Porto Indoor, Portugal	W75	Hard (i)	(Hungary) Anna Bondár	6–7^{(4–7)}, 2–6
Win	2–8	Aug 2024	Přerov Cup, Czech Republic	W75	Clay	Kristina Dmitruk	6–2, 3–6, 6–1
Win	3–8	Aug 2025	ITF Oldenzaal, Netherlands	W50	Clay	(Italy) Silvia Ambrosio	7–6^{(9–7)}, 7–6^{(7–5)}
Loss	3–9	Dec 2025	ITF Sëlva Gardena, Italy	W50	Hard (i)	(Poland) Martyna Kubka	5–7, 3–6
Loss	3–10	Jan 2026	ITF Birmingham, United Kingdom	W35	Hard (i)	(Estonia) Elena Malõgina	4–6, 4–6
Win	4–10	Feb 2026	AK Ladies Open, Germany	W75	Carpet (i)	Julia Avdeeva	6–2, 6–1
Win	5–10	Mar 2026	ITF Helsinki, Finland	W50	Hard (i)	(China) Gao Xinyu	4–0 ret.
Win	6–10	May 2026	Wiesbaden Open, Germany	W100	Clay	(Slovakia) Mia Pohánková	6–2, 7–6^{(7–3)}

=== Doubles: 10 (3 titles, 7 runner-ups) ===
Legend W60/W75 tournaments (2–3) W50 tournaments (0–2) W25/W35 tournaments (1–1) W15 tournaments (0–1)	Finals by surface Hard (0–3) Clay (3–4)

Result	W–L	Date	Tournament	Tier	Surface	Partner	Opponents	Score
Loss	0–1	May 2022	ITF Cairo, Egypt	W15	Clay	(Bulgaria) Ani Vangelova	(Egypt) Yasmin Ezzat (Netherlands) Noa Liauw a Fong	6–3, 3–6, [9–11]
Win	1–1	Aug 2022	ITF Leipzig, Germany	W25	Clay	(Germany) Ella Seidel	(Germany) Tea Lukic (Germany) Joëlle Steur	6–0, 7–5
Win	2–1	Jul 2023	Amstelveen Open, Netherlands	W60	Clay	(Luxembourg) Marie Weckerle	(Turkey) Ayla Aksu (Croatia) Ena Kajević	7–5, 6–3
Loss	2–2	May 2024	Prague Open, Czech Republic	W75	Clay	(Germany) Ella Seidel	(Australia) Jaimee Fourlis (Czech Republic) Dominika Šalková	7–5, 5–7, [4–10]
Loss	2–3	Aug 2024	Přerov Cup, Czech Republic	W75	Clay	(Greece) Sapfo Sakellaridi	Elena Pridankina (Czech Republic) Julie Štruplová	3–6, 4–6
Win	3–3	Sep 2024	ITF Kuršumlijska Banja, Serbia	W75	Clay	Amina Anshba	(Romania) Cristina Dinu (Bulgaria) Lia Karatancheva	6–2, 7–6^{(7–2)}
Loss	3–4	Jan 2025	Porto Indoor, Portugal	W75	Hard (i)	(Czech Republic) Tereza Valentová	(Hong Kong) Eudice Chong (Slovenia) Nika Radišić	6–7^{(5–7)}, 1–6
Loss	3–5	Aug 2025	ITF Oldenzaal, Netherlands	W50	Clay	(Turkey) İpek Öz	(Netherlands) Joy de Zeeuw (Netherlands) Sarah van Emst	6–7^{(3–7)}, 6–7^{(4–7)}
Loss	3–6	Jan 2026	ITF Birmingham, United Kingdom	W35	Hard (i)	(Netherlands) Stéphanie Visscher	(Chinese Taipei) Lee Ya-hsin (Hong Kong) Cody Wong	1–6, 3–6
Loss	3–7	Feb 2026	Porto Indoor, Portugal	W50	Hard (i)	(Bosnia and Herzegovina) Anita Wagner	(Spain) Ángela Fita Boluda (Switzerland) Ylena In-Albon	4–6, 6–7^{(5–7)}
