= Přerov Cup =

- 2024 Přerov Cup

ITF Women's Tour
- Event name: Z-Group Cup (2024–); Zubr Cup (2005–23)
- Location: Přerov, Czech Republic
- Venue: TK Precheza Přerov
- Category: ITF Women's World Tennis Tour
- Surface: Clay / outdoor
- Draw: 32S/64Q/16D
- Prize money: $60,000
- Website: www.tenis-prerov.cz

The Přerov Cup is a tournament for professional female tennis players played on outdoor clay courts. The event is classified as a ITF Women's World Tennis Tour tournament and has been held in Přerov, Czech Republic, since 2005. In 2021, it was upgraded to a $60,000 event.

== Past finals ==
=== Singles ===
Year	Champion	Runner-up	Score
2024	(Germany) Noma Noha Akugue	Kristina Dmitruk	6–2, 3–6, 6–1
2023	(Serbia) Mia Ristić	(Italy) Aurora Zantedeschi	6–1, 6–2
2022	(Czech Republic) Barbora Palicová	(Burundi) Sada Nahimana	6–2, 1–6, 6–0
2021	(Czech Republic) Linda Nosková	(Romania) Alexandra Cadanțu-Ignatik	6–7^{(2–7)}, 6–4, 6–3
2020	(United States) Grace Min	(Spain) Georgina García Pérez	6–3, 0–6, 7–5
2019	(Ukraine) Anhelina Kalinina	(Bulgaria) Elitsa Kostova	6–1, 4–6, 6–1
2018	(Czech Republic) Gabriela Pantůčková	(Czech Republic) Magdaléna Pantůčková	6–4, 6–0
2017	(Slovakia) Lenka Juríková	(Czech Republic) Miriam Kolodziejová	6–4, 6–4
2016	(Slovakia) Lenka Juríková	(Ukraine) Anastasia Zarytska	6–2, 6–4
2015	(Czech Republic) Markéta Vondroušová	(Russia) Ekaterina Alexandrova	6–1, 6–4
2014	(Czech Republic) Barbora Krejčíková	(Slovakia) Lenka Juríková	6–3, 6–4
2013	(Hungary) Réka Luca Jani	(Russia) Ekaterina Alexandrova	6–2, 7–6^{(7–4)}
2012	(Romania) Andreea Mitu	(Czech Republic) Martina Kubičíková	6–2, 6–3
2011	(Hungary) Réka Luca Jani	(Czech Republic) Karolína Plíšková	6–0, 6–3
2010	(Czech Republic) Renata Voráčová	(France) Claire Feuerstein	4–6, 6–3, 7–5
2009	(France) Claire Feuerstein	(Russia) Ksenia Lykina	6–7^{(5–7)}, 6–3, 6–4
2008	(Czech Republic) Tereza Hladíková	(Croatia) Ana Savić	6–4, 7–5
2007	(Czech Republic) Petra Kvitová	(Slovakia) Magdaléna Rybáriková	7–5, 6–3
2006	(United Kingdom) Anne Keothavong	(Germany) Angelique Kerber	6–4, 7–5
2005	(Poland) Joanna Sakowicz	(Czech Republic) Lucie Hradecká	6–4, 6–4

=== Doubles ===
Year	Champions	Runners-up	Score
2023	Elena Pridankina (Czech Republic) Julie Štruplová	(Germany) Noma Noha Akugue (Greece) Sapfo Sakellaridi	6–3, 6–4
2023	(Greece) Sapfo Sakellaridi (Czech Republic) Anna Sisková	(Italy) Angelica Moratelli (Italy) Camilla Rosatello	6–2, 6–3
2022	(Czech Republic) Anastasia Dețiuc (Czech Republic) Miriam Kolodziejová	(Japan) Funa Kozaki (Japan) Misaki Matsuda	7–6^{(7–4)}, 4–6, [10–5]
2021	(Brazil) Carolina Alves (United Kingdom) Sarah Beth Grey	(Japan) Mana Kawamura (Japan) Funa Kozaki	6–4, 3–6, [13–11]
2020	(Slovakia) Chantal Škamlová (Czech Republic) Tereza Smitková	(Romania) Nicoleta Dascălu (Cyprus) Raluca Șerban	7–6^{(7–5)}, 7–6^{(7–4)}
2019	(Czech Republic) Karolína Kubáňová (Czech Republic) Nikola Tomanová	(Czech Republic) Kateřina Mandlíková (Russia) Anna Morgina	6–4, 7–6^{(7–2)}
2018	(Slovakia) Jana Jablonovská (Slovakia) Lenka Juríková	(Czech Republic) Karolína Kubáňová (Czech Republic) Laetitia Pulchartová	2–6, 6–1, [10–6]
2017	(Czech Republic) Dagmar Dudláková (Czech Republic) Miriam Kolodziejová	(Czech Republic) Tereza Janatová (Czech Republic) Natálie Novotná	6–1, 6–3
2016	(Slovakia) Jana Jablonovská (Czech Republic) Vendula Žovincová	(Czech Republic) Kristýna Hrabalová (Czech Republic) Nikola Tomanová	6–2, 7–6^{(7–4)}
2015	(Czech Republic) Miriam Kolodziejová (Czech Republic) Markéta Vondroušová	(Czech Republic) Martina Borecká (Czech Republic) Jesika Malečková	6–4, 6–1
2014	(Slovakia) Chantal Škamlová (Czech Republic) Barbora Štefková	(Czech Republic) Eva Rutarová (Czech Republic) Karolína Stuchlá	6–4, 6–3
2013	(Czech Republic) Petra Krejsová (Czech Republic) Jesika Malečková	(Russia) Victoria Kan (Ukraine) Ganna Poznikhirenko	6–1, 4–6, [10–5]
2012	(Czech Republic) Nikola Fraňková (Czech Republic) Tereza Hladíková	(Czech Republic) Simona Dobrá (Czech Republic) Lucie Kriegsmannová	4–6, 7–6^{(9–7)}, [10–8]
2011	(Czech Republic) Kateřina Kramperová (Czech Republic) Karolína Plíšková	(Ukraine) Lyudmyla Kichenok (Ukraine) Nadiia Kichenok	6–3, 6–4
2010	(Czech Republic) Iveta Gerlová (Czech Republic) Lucie Kriegsmannová	(Poland) Olga Brózda (Poland) Natalia Kołat	6–1, 6–3
2009	(Austria) Sandra Klemenschits (Slovenia) Andreja Klepač	(Croatia) Darija Jurak (Hungary) Katalin Marosi	7–6^{(7–3)}, 3–6, [10–7]
2008	(Czech Republic) Tereza Hladíková (Czech Republic) Renata Voráčová	(Russia) Ksenia Lykina (Czech Republic) Kateřina Vaňková	6–0, 3–6, [10–3]
2007	(Czech Republic) Veronika Chvojková (Czech Republic) Kateřina Vaňková	(Czech Republic) Gabriela Navrátilová (Czech Republic) Michaela Paštiková	3–6, 6–4, [12–10]
2006	(Czech Republic) Nikola Fraňková (Czech Republic) Andrea Hlaváčková	(Czech Republic) Eva Hrdinová (Slovakia) Stanislava Hrozenská	6–2, 6–7^{(5–7)}, 6–3
2005	(Czech Republic) Lucie Hradecká (Czech Republic) Gabriela Navrátilová	(Germany) Gréta Arn (Estonia) Margit Rüütel	3–6, 6–4, 6–4
