= Mia Ristić =

Serbian tennis player (born 2006)

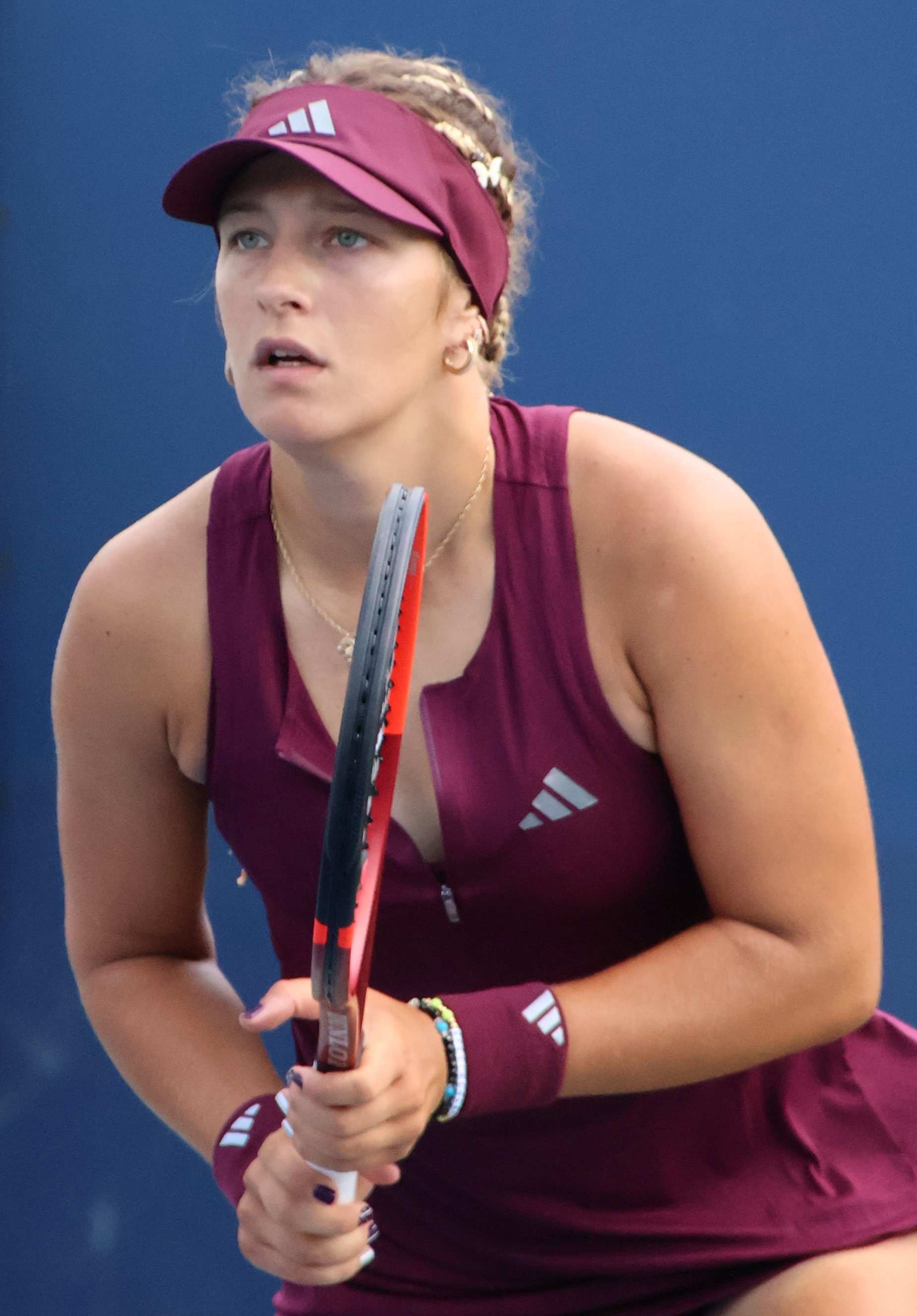
- Ristić at the 2026 US Open
- Native name: Миа Ристић
- Country (sports): Serbia
- Residence: Bor, Serbia
- Born: 17 May 2006 (age 20) Niš, Serbia and Montenegro
- Plays: Right (two-handed backhand)
- Coach: Vladimir Jovanović (former)
- Prize money: $102,863

Singles
- Career record: 150–102
- Career titles: 3 ITF
- Highest ranking: No. 182 (21 August 2026)
- Current ranking: No. 182 (21 August 2026)

Grand Slam singles results
- US Open: Q3 (2026)
- French Open Junior: 1R (2023)

Doubles
- Career record: 6–7
- Highest ranking: No. 876 (22 June 2026)
- Current ranking: No. 876 (29 June 2026)

Team competitions
- Fed Cup: 9–8 (Sin. 9–6)
- Last updated on: 21 August 2026.

Mia Ristić (Serbian Cyrillic: Миа Ристић; born 17 May 2006) is a Serbian tennis player. She achieved a career-high singles ranking of world No. 182 on 21 August 2026.

== Career ==
=== Junior years ===
Ristić won the U16 European Championship in Přerov, Czech Republic in July 2022, without dropping a set. In the final, she defeated Spaniard Marta Soriano Santiago, losing only two games, a scoreline she achieved four times during the competition.

=== Professional ===
In August 2022, she won her first professional ITF tournament, aged 16 years old, defeating Cristina Dinu in the final of the $25k event in Vrnjačka Banja, Serbia.

In July 2023, Ristić qualified for her WTA Tour main-draw debut at the 2023 Palermo Ladies Open. She defeated Çağla Büyükakçay and Kathinka von Deichmann to qualify, winning both matches in three sets, despite facing match points. She needed four hours and 12 minutes to beat Büyükakçay, the longest match in the tournament's history.

The following month, at the age of 17 years and three months, Ristić won her second tournament at the Přerov Cup in the Czech Republic, thus becoming the youngest Serbian woman to win an ITF World Tour title at W60 level. She beat the tournament's top seed Veronika Erjavec in the second round, and fellow qualifier Aurora Zantedeschi in the final.

== Coaches and team ==
During her junior career, Ristić trained with Vladimir Jovanović at TK Setnet in Belgrade, traveling for weekend training sessions.

== ITF Circuit finals ==
=== Singles: 7 (4 titles, 3 runner-ups) ===
Legend W60/75 tournaments (3–0) W50 tournaments (0–1) W25/35 tournaments (1–2)	Finals by surface Hard (0–1) Clay (4–2)

Result	W–L	Date	Tournament	Tier	Surface	Opponent	Score
Win	1–0	Aug 2022	Vrnjačka Banja Open, Serbia	W25	Clay	(Romania) Cristina Dinu	0–6, 7–5, 7–5
Loss	1–1	Oct 2022	ITF Sozopol, Bulgaria	W25	Hard	(Hong Kong) Adithya Karunaratne	3–6, 1–6
Win	2–1	Aug 2023	Přerov Cup, Czech Republic	W60	Clay	(Italy) Aurora Zantedeschi	6–1, 6–2
Loss	2–2	Aug 2024	ITF Bytom, Poland	W50	Clay	(Spain) Lucía Cortez Llorca	6–0, 4–6, 5–7
Loss	2–3	Jun 2025	ITF Klagenfurt, Austria	W35	Clay	(Spain) Kaitlin Quevedo	4–6, 4–6
Win	3–3	Jul 2026	Internazionali di Cordenons, Italy	W75	Clay	(Italy) Nuria Brancaccio	6–3, 6–3
Win	4–3	Aug 2026	Serbian Tennis Tour, Serbia	W75	Clay	(Bulgaria) Rositsa Dencheva	6–0, 7–6^{(4)}

=== Doubles: 1 (runner–up) ===
Legend W50 tournaments	Finals by surface Hard (0–1)

Result	W–L	Date	Tournament	Tier	Surface	Partner	Opponents	Score
Loss	0–1	Nov 2024	ITF Sëlva Gardena, Italy	W50	Hard (i)	(Germany) Carolina Kuhl	(Poland) Martyna Kubka (Sweden) Lisa Zaar	3–6, 0–6
