= Julie Štruplová =

Czech tennis player (born 2004)

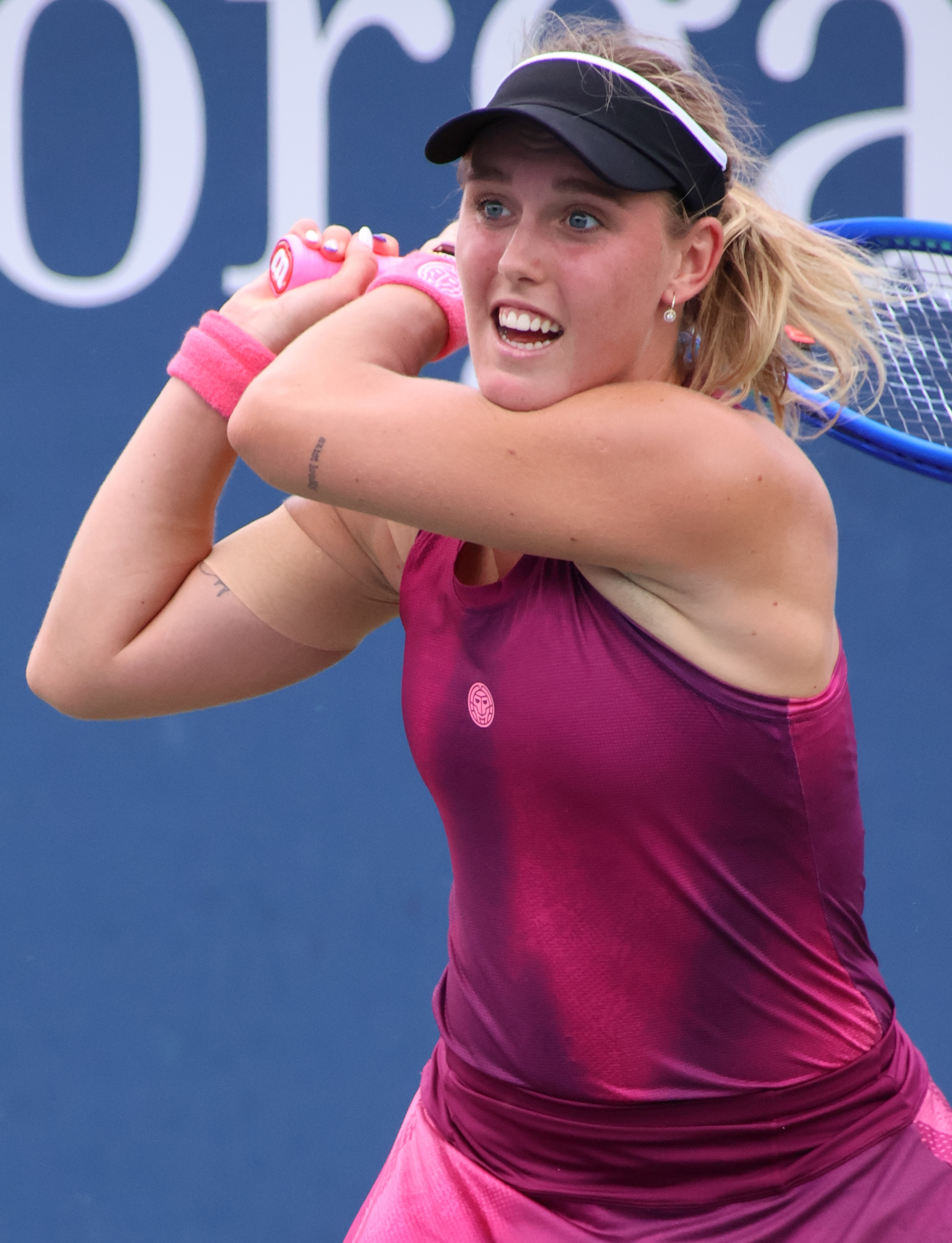
- Štruplová at the 2026 US Open
- Country (sports): Czech Republic
- Born: 16 November 2004 (age 21) Jablonec nad Nisou, Czech Republic
- Prize money: US$ 160,485

Singles
- Career record: 188–97
- Career titles: 8 ITF
- Highest ranking: No. 207 (20 July 2026)
- Current ranking: No. 229 (28 September 2026)

Grand Slam singles results
- US Open: Q1 (2026)

Doubles
- Career record: 80–53
- Career titles: 7 ITF
- Highest ranking: No. 222 (21 October 2024)
- Current ranking: No. 502 (28 September 2026)
- Last updated on: 28 September 2026.

Julie Štruplová (born 16 November 2004) is a Czech professional tennis player. She has career-high rankings of No. 207 in singles, achieved on 20 July 2026, and No. 222 in doubles, achieved on 21 October 2024.

== Early life ==
Štruplová was born to a volleyball family in Jablonec nad Nisou. She played for ČLTK Bižuterie Jablonec nad Nisou in her youth and currently plays for TK Agrofert Prostějov.

== Professional ==
In June 2021, she received a wildcard into the qualifying draw of the W60 Macha Lake Open.

In September 2023, she reached the final of the W25 Frýdek-Místek Open, but lost to Silvia Ambrosio. In December 2023, she won the W25 Raiffeisen ITF Women's Val Gardena Südtirol in Selva Gardena, defeating Martyna Kubka in the final. She subsequently reached the top 300 in the WTA rankings.

In May 2024, she reached the semifinals of the W75 Empire Tennis Academy Open in Trnava as a qualifier, upsetting third seed Tamara Zidanšek in the process.

== Performance timeline ==
Key
| W | F | SF | QF | #R | RR | Q# | P# | DNQ | A | Z# | PO | G | S | B | NMS | NTI | P | NH |

(W) winner; (F) finalist; (SF) semifinalist; (QF) quarterfinalist; (#R) rounds 4, 3, 2, 1; (RR) round-robin stage; (Q#) qualification round; (P#) preliminary round; (DNQ) did not qualify; (A) absent; (Z#) Davis/Fed Cup Zonal Group (with number indication) or (PO) play-off; (G) gold, (S) silver or (B) bronze Olympic/Paralympic medal; (NMS) not a Masters tournament; (NTI) not a Tier I tournament; (P) postponed; (NH) not held; (SR) strike rate (events won / competed); (W–L) win–loss record.
To avoid confusion and double counting, these charts are updated at the conclusion of a tournament or when the player's participation has ended.

=== Singles ===
| Tournament | 2026 | SR | W–L | Win % |
|---|---|---|---|---|
Grand Slam tournaments
| Australian Open | A | 0 / 0 | 0–0 | – |
| French Open | A | 0 / 0 | 0–0 | – |
| Wimbledon | A | 0 / 0 | 0–0 | – |
| US Open | Q1 | 0 / 0 | 0–0 | – |
| Win–Loss | 0–0 | 0 / 0 | 0–0 | – |

== ITF Circuit finals ==
=== Singles: 19 (8 titles, 11 runner–ups) ===
| Legend W75 tournaments (1–0) W50 tournaments (1–0) W25/35 tournaments (4–9) W15 tournaments (2–2) | Finals by surface Hard (1–0) Clay (7–11) |

| Result | W–L | Date | Tournament | Tier | Surface | Opponent | Score |
|---|---|---|---|---|---|---|---|
| Win | 1–0 | Sep 2022 | ITF Frýdek-Místek, Czech Republic | W25 | Clay | (Germany) Lena Papadakis | 6–3, 2–6, 6–4 |
| Loss | 1–1 | Mar 2023 | ITF Antalya, Turkey | W15 | Clay | (Japan) Miho Kuramochi | 6–7^{(4)}, 4–6 |
| Loss | 1–2 | Mar 2023 | ITF Antalya, Turkey | W15 | Clay | Daria Lodikova | 6–4, 0–6, 2–6 |
| Win | 2–2 | Apr 2023 | ITF Antalya, Turkey | W15 | Clay | (Turkey) İlay Yörük | 6–7^{(2)}, 6–1, 6–2 |
| Loss | 2–3 | May 2023 | ITF Warmbad Villach, Austria | W25 | Clay | (United States) Elvina Kalieva | 6–4, 2–6, 1–6 |
| Loss | 2–4 | Jul 2023 | ITF Aschaffenburg, Germany | W25 | Clay | (Belgium) Marie Benoit | 3–6, 3–6 |
| Loss | 2–5 | Sep 2023 | ITF Frýdek-Místek, Czech Republic | W25 | Clay | (Italy) Silvia Ambrosio | 0–6, 2–6 |
| Win | 3–5 | Nov 2023 | ITF Selva Gardena, Italy | W25 | Hard (i) | (Poland) Martyna Kubka | 6–2, 6–2 |
| Loss | 3–6 | Jul 2024 | ITF Horb, Germany | W35 | Clay | (Slovenia) Veronika Erjavec | 5–7, 0–6 |
| Loss | 3–7 | Aug 2024 | ITF Erwitte, Germany | W35 | Clay | (Spain) Irene Burillo Escorihuela | 3–6, 2–6 |
| Win | 4–7 | Sep 2024 | ITF Santa Margherita di Pula, Italy | W35 | Clay | (Italy) Nuria Brancaccio | 5–7, 7–6^{(5)}, 6–2 |
| Win | 5–7 | Aug 2025 | ITF Kraków, Poland | W15 | Clay | (France) Yara Bartashevich | 6–2, 6–3 |
| Loss | 5–8 | Aug 2025 | ITF Brașov, Romania | W35 | Clay | (Spain) Ángela Fita Boluda | 5–7, 4–6 |
| Win | 6–8 | Oct 2025 | ITF Santa Margherita di Pula, Italy | W35 | Clay | (Italy) Jennifer Ruggeri | 2–6, 6–2, 6–4 |
| Loss | 6–9 | Nov 2025 | ITF Antalya, Turkey | W35 | Clay | (Sweden) Caijsa Hennemann | 6–4, 6–7^{(2)}, 4–6 |
| Loss | 6–10 | Nov 2025 | ITF Antalya, Turkey | W35 | Clay | (Georgia (country)) Sofia Shapatava | 6–2, 5–7, 3–6 |
| Win | 7–10 | May 2026 | ITF Portorož, Slovenia | W50 | Clay | (Malta) Francesca Curmi | 6–3, 6–3 |
| Loss | 7–11 | Jul 2026 | ITF Buzău, Romania | W35 | Clay | (Bulgaria) Rositsa Dencheva | 0–6, 3–6 |
| Win | 8–11 | Jul 2026 | ITS Cup, Czech Republic | W75 | Clay | (Slovakia) Radka Zelníčková | 6–3, 6–4 |

=== Doubles: 12 (7 titles, 5 runner–ups) ===
| Legend W75 tournaments (1–0) W50 tournaments (1–0) W25/35 tournaments (5–5) | Finals by surface Hard (2–0) Clay (4–5) Carpet (1–0) |

| Result | W–L | Date | Tournament | Tier | Surface | Partner | Opponents | Score |
|---|---|---|---|---|---|---|---|---|
| Win | 1–0 | Apr 2023 | ITF Osijek, Croatia | W25 | Clay | (Czech Republic) Dominika Šalková | (Czech Republic) Denisa Hindová (Czech Republic) Karolína Kubáňová | 6–3, 6–4 |
| Win | 2–0 | Nov 2023 | ITF Solarino, Italy | W25 | Carpet | (Czech Republic) Linda Klimovičová | (Italy) Gaia Maduzzi (Italy) Vittoria Paganetti | 6–1, 6–7^{(4)}, [10–8] |
| Win | 3–0 | Nov 2023 | ITF Limassol, Cyprus | W25 | Hard | (Belgium) Hanne Vandewinkel | (Germany) Katharina Hobgarski (Spain) Guiomar Maristany | 6–4, 6–4 |
| Win | 4–0 | Apr 2024 | ITF Hammamet, Tunisia | W35 | Clay | Ksenia Zaytseva | (Colombia) María Herazo González (Australia) Kaylah McPhee | 6–4, 4–6, [10–4] |
| Loss | 4–1 | Jul 2024 | ITF Aschaffenburg, Germany | W35 | Clay | (Romania) Andreea Prisăcariu | (Netherlands) Jasmijn Gimbrère (Netherlands) Stéphanie Visscher | 1–6, 6–1, [3–10] |
| Loss | 4–2 | Aug 2024 | ITF Leipzig, Germany | W35 | Clay | (Czech Republic) Denisa Hindová | (Georgia (country)) Ekaterine Gorgodze (Germany) Katharina Hobgarski | 2–6, 6–3, [8–10] |
| Win | 5–2 | Aug 2024 | Přerov Cup, Czech Republic | W75 | Clay | Elena Pridankina | (Germany) Noma Noha Akugue (Greece) Sapfo Sakellaridi | 6–3, 6–4 |
| Loss | 5–3 | Sep 2024 | ITF Santa Margherita di Pula, Italy | W35 | Clay | (Germany) Katharina Hobgarski | (Spain) Aliona Bolsova (Netherlands) Eva Vedder | 3–6, 3–6 |
| Loss | 5–4 | Sep 2024 | ITF Santa Margherita di Pula, Italy | W35 | Clay | (Italy) Silvia Ambrosio | (Poland) Daria Kuczer (Sweden) Lisa Zaar | walkover |
| Win | 6–4 | Nov 2024 | ITF Trnava, Slovakia | W50 | Hard (i) | (Czech Republic) Dominika Šalková | (Turkey) İpek Öz (Croatia) Tara Würth | 6–4, 6–4 |
| Win | 7–4 | Jun 2025 | ITF Klagenfurt, Austria | W35 | Clay | (Czech Republic) Aneta Laboutková | (Italy) Anastasia Abbagnato; Daria Lodikova | 4–6, 7–6^{(4)}, [11–9] |
| Loss | 7–5 | Sep 2025 | ITF Santa Margherita di Pula, Italy | W35 | Clay | (Italy) Alessandra Mazzola | (Greece) Valentini Grammatikopoulou (Germany) Antonia Schmidt | 6–7^{(5)}, 6–3, [7–10] |
