= 2024 Serbian Tennis Tour – Singles =

Singles
- 2024 Serbian Tennis Tour

Final
- Champion: (Serbia) Lola Radivojević
- Runner-up: (Czech Republic) Barbora Palicová
- Score: 6–4, 6–2

Events
Singles	Doubles
Serbian Tennis Tour	· 2024 →

This was the first edition of the tournament.

Lola Radivojević won the title, defeating Barbora Palicová in the final, 6–4, 6–2.

== Seeds ==
All seeds receive a bye into the second round.

1. (Romania) Cristina Dinu (second round)
2. (Croatia) Tena Lukas (quarterfinals)
3. (Czech Republic) Barbora Palicová (final)
4. (Croatia) Petra Marčinko (second round)
5. (Bulgaria) Isabella Shinikova (second round)
6. (Greece) Valentini Grammatikopoulou (second round)
7. (Canada) Carson Branstine (second round)
8. (Greece) Sapfo Sakellaridi (quarterfinals)
9. (Spain) Ángela Fita Boluda (semifinals)
10. Daria Lodikova (third round)
11. (Serbia) Lola Radivojević (champion)
12. (Canada) Victoria Mboko (second round)
13. Tatiana Prozorova (quarterfinals)
14. Anastasiia Gureva (second round, retired)
15. Alexandra Shubladze (third round)
16. (Switzerland) Ylena In-Albon (second round)

== Draw ==
Key

- Q = Qualifier
- WC = Wild card
- LL = Lucky loser
- Alt = Alternate
- ITF = ITF entry
- PR = Protected ranking
- SR = Special ranking
- SE = Special exempt
- JE = Junior exempt
- JR = Junior Accelerator Programme entrant
- CO = College Accelerator Programme entrant
- NG = Next Gen Accelerator Program entrant
- w/o = Walkover
- r = Retired
- d = Defaulted

=== Finals ===
Quarterfinals
(Slovenia) Živa Falkner	6	4	4
9	(Spain) Ángela Fita Boluda	2	6	6
3	(Czech Republic) Barbora Palicová	6	7^{7}
8	(Greece) Sapfo Sakellaridi	0	6^{5}
11/WC	(Serbia) Lola Radivojević	6	6
13	Tatiana Prozorova	2	3
(Kazakhstan) Zhibek Kulambayeva	1	7	6
2	(Croatia) Tena Lukas	6	5	4

Semifinals
9	(Spain) Ángela Fita Boluda	3	2
3	(Czech Republic) Barbora Palicová	6	6
11/WC	(Serbia) Lola Radivojević	6	6
(Kazakhstan) Zhibek Kulambayeva	2	1

Final
3	(Czech Republic) Barbora Palicová	4	2
11/WC	(Serbia) Lola Radivojević	6	6

=== Top half ===
==== Section 1 ====
First round
Q	(Spain) A Giraldi Requena	0	5
(Slovenia) Ž Falkner	6	7
(Turkey) P Özgen	7^{12}	6^{2}	5
(Finland) L Hietaranta	6^{10}	7^{7}	7
WC	(Croatia) T Würth	6	6
WC	(Greece) E Korokozidi	1	2
K Laskutova	6	3	3
(France) Y Bartashevich	2	6	6

Second round
1	(Romania) C Dinu	6	3	2
(Slovenia) Ž Falkner	4	6	6
(Finland) L Hietaranta	2	6	6
16	(Switzerland) Y In-Albon	6	4	4
9	(Spain) Á Fita Boluda	6	6
WC	(Croatia) T Würth	2	4
(France) Y Bartashevich	6	6
5	(Bulgaria) I Shinikova	3	3

Third round
(Slovenia) Ž Falkner	6	6
(Finland) L Hietaranta	3	4
9	(Spain) Á Fita Boluda	6	5	6
(France) Y Bartashevich	4	7	3

Quarterfinals
(Slovenia) Ž Falkner	6	4	4
9	(Spain) Á Fita Boluda	2	6	6

==== Section 2 ====
First round
WC	(United States) G Kondos	1	1
Q	(Netherlands) S van Emst	6	6
(Serbia) N Senić	3	1
Q	(Bulgaria) R Dencheva	6	6
(Australia) A Bozovic	6	6
(Bulgaria) D Glushkova	3	3
(Greece) M Matoula	4	6	6
(Japan) Y Naito	6	1	1

Second round
3	(Czech Republic) B Palicová	7	2	6
Q	(Netherlands) S van Emst	5	6	4
Q	(Bulgaria) R Dencheva	6^{4}	3
15	A Shubladze	7^{7}	6
10	D Lodikova	3	6	6
(Australia) A Bozovic	6	3	0
(Greece) M Matoula	6	4	5
8	(Greece) S Sakellaridi	4	6	7

Third round
3	(Czech Republic) B Palicová	7^{7}	2	6
15	A Shubladze	6^{3}	6	4
10	D Lodikova	6	2	5
8	(Greece) S Sakellaridi	3	6	7

Quarterfinals
3	(Czech Republic) B Palicová	6	7^{7}
8	(Greece) S Sakellaridi	0	6^{5}

=== Bottom half ===
==== Section 3 ====
First round
Q	E Ovcharenko	6	6
(Italy) A Abbagnato	2	3
(Greece) M Laki	4	6	6
Q	U Hrabavets	6	0	1
E Maklakova	4	6	7
A Zolotareva	6	3	5
(Bulgaria) L Karatancheva	3	4
Q	(Serbia) T Kostović	6	6

Second round
6	(Greece) V Grammatikopoulou	4	0
Q	E Ovcharenko	6	6
(Greece) M Laki	2	5
11/WC	(Serbia) L Radivojević	6	7
13	T Prozorova	7^{7}	6
E Maklakova	6^{1}	2
Q	(Serbia) T Kostović	1	6	6
4	(Croatia) P Marčinko	6	4	4

Third round
Q	E Ovcharenko	4	4
11/WC	(Serbia) L Radivojević	6	6
13	T Prozorova	6	7^{7}
Q	(Serbia) T Kostović	2	6^{5}

Quarterfinals
11/WC	(Serbia) L Radivojević	6	6
13	T Prozorova	2	3

==== Section 4 ====
First round
(Kazakhstan) Z Kulambayeva	3	6	6
WC	(Serbia) D Marić	6	1	1
Q	(Netherlands) L Ebeling Koning	4	2
(France) S Cakarevic	6	6
(Serbia) A Stanković	4	3
(Romania) A Prisăcariu	6	6
Q	(Bulgaria) L Encheva	2	7^{7}	6
(Spain) K Quevedo	6	6^{5}	3

Second round
7	(Canada) C Branstine	6	1	3
(Kazakhstan) Z Kulambayeva	3	6	6
(France) S Cakarevic	3	6	6
12	(Canada) V Mboko	6	2	4
14	A Gureva	1	0^{r}
(Romania) A Prisăcariu	6	1
Q	(Bulgaria) L Encheva	6^{6}	5
2	(Croatia) T Lukas	7^{8}	7

Third round
(Kazakhstan) Z Kulambayeva	6	6
(France) S Cakarevic	1	3
(Romania) A Prisăcariu	3	1
2	(Croatia) T Lukas	6	6

Quarterfinals
(Kazakhstan) Z Kulambayeva	1	7	6
2	(Croatia) T Lukas	6	5	4
