= 2024 Serbian Tennis Tour 2 – Doubles =

Doubles
- 2024 Serbian Tennis Tour 2

Final
- Champions: Amina Anshba (Germany) Noma Noha Akugue
- Runners-up: (Romania) Cristina Dinu (Bulgaria) Lia Karatancheva
- Score: 6–2, 7–6^{(7–2)}

Events
Singles	Doubles
← 2024 ·	Serbian Tennis Tour	· 2025 →

Petra Marčinko and Lola Radivojević were the defending champions but Marčinko chose not to participate. Radivojević partnered with Nina Stojanović, but they lost in the quarterfinals to Amina Anshba and Noma Noha Akugue.

Anshba and Noha Akugue won the title, defeating Cristina Dinu and Lia Karatancheva in the final; 6–2, 7–6^{(7–2)}.

== Seeds ==
1. (Romania) Irina Bara / (Slovenia) Dalila Jakupović (first round, withdrew)
2. (Slovenia) Veronika Erjavec / (Latvia) Darja Semeņistaja (semifinals)
3. Amina Anshba / (Germany) Noma Noha Akugue (champions)
4. (Romania) Cristina Dinu / (Bulgaria) Lia Karatancheva (final)

== Draw ==
=== Key ===
- Q = Qualifier
- WC = Wild card
- LL = Lucky loser
- Alt = Alternate
- SE = Special exempt
- PR = Protected ranking
- ITF = ITF entry
- JE = Junior exempt
- w/o = Walkover
- r = Retired
- d = Defaulted
- SR = Special ranking

First round
1	(Romania) I Bara (Slovenia) D Jakupović
(Serbia) N Senić (Serbia) A Stanković	w/o
A Gureva; E Reyngold	4	6	[10]
(United States) C Rosca (Australia) A Sharma	6	3	[4]
4	(Romania) C Dinu (Bulgaria) L Karatancheva	6	6
WC	(Romania) IA Ionescu (Germany) J Vanik	3	2
WC	(Lithuania) K Bubelytė (Poland) M Podlińska
(Romania) A Roșca (Greece) S Sakellaridi	w/o
WC	(Bulgaria) D Glushkova (Ukraine) A Zaparyniuk	3	1
(Serbia) L Radivojević (Serbia) N Stojanović	6	6
(Poland) G Feistel (Cyprus) R Șerban	4	7	[9]
3	A Anshba (Germany) N Noha Akugue	6	5	[11]
(Romania) Ș Bojică; E Burdina	6	6
(Latvia) K Bartone (Germany) F Gettwart	1	4
(Slovenia) Ž Falkner (Croatia) T Würth	4	4
2	(Slovenia) V Erjavec (Latvia) D Semeņistaja	6	6

Quarterfinals
(Serbia) N Senić (Serbia) A Stanković	3	6	[8]
A Gureva; E Reyngold	6	4	[10]
4	(Romania) C Dinu (Bulgaria) L Karatancheva	w/o
(Romania) A Roșca (Greece) S Sakellaridi
(Serbia) L Radivojević (Serbia) N Stojanović	7^{7}	1	[6]
3	A Anshba (Germany) N Noha Akugue	6^{2}	6	[10]
(Romania) Ș Bojică; E Burdina	5	2
2	(Slovenia) V Erjavec (Latvia) D Semeņistaja	7	6

Semifinals
A Gureva; E Reyngold	6^{1}	6	[9]
4	(Romania) C Dinu (Bulgaria) L Karatancheva	7^{7}	1	[11]
3	A Anshba (Germany) N Noha Akugue	6	7^{7}
2	(Slovenia) V Erjavec (Latvia) D Semeņistaja	2	6^{5}

Final
4	(Romania) C Dinu (Bulgaria) L Karatancheva	2	6^{2}
3	A Anshba (Germany) N Noha Akugue	6	7^{7}
