= 2024 Serbian Tennis Tour 2 – Singles =

Singles
- 2024 Serbian Tennis Tour 2

Final
- Champion: (Serbia) Lola Radivojević
- Runner-up: (Cyprus) Raluca Șerban
- Score: 6–2, 7–6^{(9–7)}

Events
Singles	Doubles
← 2024 ·	Serbian Tennis Tour	· 2025 →

Lola Radivojević successfully defended her title, defeating Raluca Șerban in the final; 6–2, 7–6^{(9–7)}.

== Seeds ==
All seeds receive a bye into the second round.

1. (Hungary) Panna Udvardy (third round)
2. (Romania) Anca Todoni (third round)
3. (Germany) Ella Seidel (third round)
4. (Latvia) Darja Semeņistaja (second round)
5. (France) Séléna Janicijevic (third round)
6. (Croatia) Lucija Ćirić Bagarić (second round)
7. (Australia) Astra Sharma (second round)
8. (Slovenia) Veronika Erjavec (third round)
9. (Austria) Sinja Kraus (second round)
10. (Germany) Noma Noha Akugue (second round)
11. (Turkey) Berfu Cengiz (quarterfinals)
12. (Serbia) Lola Radivojević (champion)
13. (North Macedonia) Lina Gjorcheska (semifinals)
14. (Romania) Irina Bara (second round)
15. (Romania) Cristina Dinu (second round)
16. (Cyprus) Raluca Șerban (final)

== Draw ==
=== Key ===
- Q = Qualifier
- WC = Wild card
- LL = Lucky loser
- Alt = Alternate
- SE = Special exempt
- PR = Protected ranking
- ITF = ITF entry
- JE = Junior exempt
- w/o = Walkover
- r = Retired
- d = Defaulted
- SR = Special ranking

=== Finals ===
Quarterfinals
13	(North Macedonia) Lina Gjorcheska	6	6
(Slovenia) Dalila Jakupović	4	3
WC	(Serbia) Nina Stojanović
12	(Serbia) Lola Radivojević	w/o
(Croatia) Tena Lukas	6	3	5
(Romania) Patricia Maria Țig	3	6	7
11	(Turkey) Berfu Cengiz	6	0	1
16	(Cyprus) Raluca Șerban	2	6	6

Semifinals
13	(North Macedonia) Lina Gjorcheska	6^{2}	6	0
12	(Serbia) Lola Radivojević	7^{7}	3	6
(Romania) Patricia Maria Țig
16	(Cyprus) Raluca Șerban	w/o

Final
12	(Serbia) Lola Radivojević	6	7^{9}
16	(Cyprus) Raluca Șerban	2	6^{7}

=== Top half ===
==== Section 1 ====
First round
(Croatia) I Primorac	6	2	7
(Australia) TN Smith	0	6	5
Q	(Germany) L Meyer auf der Heide	4	6	6
WC	(Greece) D Pavlou	6	4	4
SE	(Germany) C Werner	3	6	6
Q	(Lithuania) K Bubelytė	6	4	3
(Romania) A Prisăcariu	6^{5}	5
(Slovenia) D Jakupović	7^{7}	7

Second round
1	(Hungary) P Udvardy	3	6	6
(Croatia) I Primorac	6	2	2
Q	(Germany) L Meyer auf der Heide	6^{5}	0
13	(North Macedonia) L Gjorcheska	7^{7}	6
9	(Austria) S Kraus	5	3
SE	(Germany) C Werner	7	6
(Slovenia) D Jakupović	7^{7}	5	6
6	(Croatia) L Ćirić Bagarić	6^{3}	7	4

Third round
1	(Hungary) P Udvardy	0	3
13	(North Macedonia) L Gjorcheska	6	6
SE	(Germany) C Werner
(Slovenia) D Jakupović	w/o

Quarterfinals
13	(North Macedonia) L Gjorcheska	6	6
(Slovenia) D Jakupović	4	3

==== Section 2 ====
First round
LL	E Reyngold	2	3
WC	(Serbia) N Stojanović	6	6
Q	(Hungary) L Udvardy	7^{7}	6
(Bulgaria) L Karatancheva	6^{4}	4
(Serbia) M Ristić	6	6
Q	(Bosnia and Herzegovina) S Tucaković	1	1
(Romania) G Lee	2	6^{3}
(Serbia) A Stanković	6	7^{7}

Second round
4	(Latvia) D Semeņistaja	1	3
WC	(Serbia) N Stojanović	6	6
Q	(Hungary) L Udvardy	6^{5}	6	6
15	(Romania) C Dinu	7^{7}	3	2
12	(Serbia) L Radivojević	2	7	6
(Serbia) M Ristić	6	5	3
(Serbia) A Stanković	1	2
5	(France) S Janicijevic	6	6

Third round
WC	(Serbia) N Stojanović	6	3	6
Q	(Hungary) L Udvardy	3	6	2
12	(Serbia) L Radivojević	6	7
5	(France) S Janicijevic	4	5

Quarterfinals
WC	(Serbia) N Stojanović
12	(Serbia) L Radivojević	w/o

=== Bottom half ===
==== Section 3 ====
First round
Q	E Burdina	3	1
(Greece) S Sakellaridi	6	6
(Czech Republic) L Samson	6^{5}	7	6^{5}
(Croatia) T Lukas	7^{7}	5	7^{7}
(Romania) PM Țig	6	2	6
WC	(Slovenia) Ž Falkner	3	6	3
(Poland) G Feistel	6	6
SR	(Romania) A Roșca	2	0

Second round
7	(Australia) A Sharma	6	6^{7}	1
(Greece) S Sakellaridi	3	7^{9}	6
(Croatia) T Lukas	2	6	6
10	(Germany) N Noha Akugue	6	4	3
14	(Romania) I Bara	4	4
(Romania) PM Țig	6	6
(Poland) G Feistel	5	4
3	(Germany) E Seidel	7	6

Third round
(Greece) S Sakellaridi	2	2
(Croatia) T Lukas	6	6
(Romania) PM Țig	6	6^{4}	6
3	(Germany) E Seidel	3	7^{7}	3

Quarterfinals
(Croatia) T Lukas	6	3	5
(Romania) PM Țig	3	6	7

==== Section 4 ====
First round
A Gureva	6	7
Q	(Bulgaria) J Stamatova	1	5
Q	(Bulgaria) D Glushkova	1	3
WC	(Serbia) T Kostović	6	6
(Serbia) N Senić	3	6	0
Q	(Bulgaria) R Dencheva	6	3	6
A Anshba	3	5
WC	(Croatia) T Würth	6	7

Second round
8	(Slovenia) V Erjavec	6	6
A Gureva	2	3
WC	(Serbia) T Kostović	6^{3}	3
11	(Turkey) B Cengiz	7^{7}	6
16	(Cyprus) R Șerban	6	6
Q	(Bulgaria) R Dencheva	4	4
WC	(Croatia) T Würth	4	3
2	(Romania) A Todoni	6	6

Third round
8	(Slovenia) V Erjavec	2	5
11	(Turkey) B Cengiz	6	7
16	(Cyprus) R Șerban	6	0	6
2	(Romania) A Todoni	4	6	4

Quarterfinals
11	(Turkey) B Cengiz	6	0	1
16	(Cyprus) R Șerban	2	6	6
