= 2024 Serbian Tennis Tour 2 =

Tennis tournament

- Date: 23–29 September 2024
- Edition: 2nd
- Category: ITF Women's World Tennis Tour
- Prize money: $60,000
- Surface: Clay / Outdoor
- Location: Kuršumlijska Banja, Serbia

Champions

Singles
- (Serbia) Lola Radivojević

Doubles
- Amina Anshba / (Germany) Noma Noha Akugue
- Serbian Tennis Tour

The 2024 Serbian Tennis Tour 2 was a professional tennis tournament played on outdoor clay courts. It was the second edition of the tournament, which was part of the 2024 ITF Women's World Tennis Tour. It took place in Kuršumlijska Banja, Serbia, between 23 and 29 September 2024.

== Champions ==
=== Singles ===
- (Serbia) Lola Radivojević def. (Cyprus) Raluca Șerban, 6–2, 7–6^{(9–7)}

=== Doubles ===
- Amina Anshba / (Germany) Noma Noha Akugue def. (Romania) Cristina Dinu / (Bulgaria) Lia Karatancheva, 6–2, 7–6^{(7–2)}

== Singles main draw entrants ==
=== Seeds ===
Country	Player	Rank	Seed
HUN	Panna Udvardy	136	1
ROU	Anca Todoni	137	2
GER	Ella Seidel	138	3
LAT	Darja Semeņistaja	141	4
FRA	Séléna Janicijevic	153	5
CRO	Lucija Ćirić Bagarić	187	6
AUS	Astra Sharma	191	7
SLO	Veronika Erjavec	194	8
AUT	Sinja Kraus	205	9
GER	Noma Noha Akugue	209	10
TUR	Berfu Cengiz	229	11
SRB	Lola Radivojević	230	12
MKD	Lina Gjorcheska	234	13
ROU	Irina Bara	242	14
ROU	Cristina Dinu	244	15
CYP	Raluca Șerban	247	16

- Rankings are as of 16 September 2024.

=== Other entrants ===
The following players received wildcards into the singles main draw:

- (Slovenia) Živa Falkner
- (Serbia) Teodora Kostović
- (Greece) Dimitra Pavlou
- (Serbia) Nina Stojanović
- (Croatia) Tara Würth

The following player received entry into the singles main draw as a special exempt:

- (Germany) Caroline Werner

The following player received entry into the singles main draw using a special ranking:

- (Romania) Andreea Roșca

The following players received entry from the qualifying draw:

- (Lithuania) Klaudija Bubelytė
- Evgeniya Burdina
- (Bulgaria) Rositsa Dencheva
- (Bulgaria) Denislava Glushkova
- (Germany) Luisa Meyer auf der Heide
- (Bulgaria) Julia Stamatova
- (Bosnia and Herzegovina) Suana Tucaković
- (Hungary) Luca Udvardy

The following player received entry as a lucky loser:

- Ekaterina Reyngold
