= 2024 Serbian Tennis Tour =

Tennis tournament

- Date: 12–18 August 2024
- Edition: 1st
- Category: ITF Women's World Tennis Tour
- Prize money: $60,000
- Surface: Clay / Outdoor
- Location: Kuršumlijska Banja, Serbia

Champions

Singles
- (Serbia) Lola Radivojević

Doubles
- (Croatia) Petra Marčinko / (Serbia) Lola Radivojević
- Serbian Tennis Tour

The 2024 Serbian Tennis Tour was a professional tennis tournament played on outdoor clay courts. It was the first edition of the tournament, which was part of the 2024 ITF Women's World Tennis Tour. It took place in Kuršumlijska Banja, Serbia, between 12 and 18 August 2024.

== Champions ==
=== Singles ===
- (Serbia) Lola Radivojević def. (Czech Republic) Barbora Palicová, 6–4, 6–2

=== Doubles ===
- (Croatia) Petra Marčinko / (Serbia) Lola Radivojević def. (Slovenia) Živa Falkner / (Croatia) Tara Würth, 7–6^{(7–5)}, 6–4

== Singles main draw entrants ==
=== Seeds ===
Country	Player	Rank	Seed
ROU	Cristina Dinu	241	1
CRO	Tena Lukas	250	2
CZE	Barbora Palicová	256	3
CRO	Petra Marčinko	294	4
BUL	Isabella Shinikova	297	5
GRE	Valentini Grammatikopoulou	304	6
CAN	Carson Branstine	314	7
GRE	Sapfo Sakellaridi	316	8
ESP	Ángela Fita Boluda	327	9
	Daria Lodikova	337	10
SRB	Lola Radivojević	350	11
CAN	Victoria Mboko	351	12
	Tatiana Prozorova	353	13
	Anastasiia Gureva	359	14
	Alexandra Shubladze	362	15
SUI	Ylena In-Albon	370	16

- Rankings are as of 5 August 2024.

=== Other entrants ===
The following players received wildcards into the singles main draw:

- (United States) Gina Kondos
- (Greece) Eleni Korokozidi
- (Serbia) Dunja Marić
- (Serbia) Lola Radivojević
- (Croatia) Tara Würth

The following players received entry from the qualifying draw:

- (Bulgaria) Rositsa Dencheva
- (Netherlands) Loes Ebeling Koning
- (Bulgaria) Lidia Encheva
- (Spain) Ana Giraldi Requena
- Ulyana Hrabavets
- (Serbia) Teodora Kostović
- Ekaterina Ovcharenko
- (Netherlands) Sarah van Emst
