= 2024 Serbian Tennis Tour – Doubles =

Doubles
- 2024 Serbian Tennis Tour

Final
- Champions: (Croatia) Petra Marčinko (Serbia) Lola Radivojević
- Runners-up: (Slovenia) Živa Falkner (Croatia) Tara Würth
- Score: 7–6^{(7–5)}, 6–4

Events
Singles	Doubles
Serbian Tennis Tour	· 2024 →

This was the first edition of the tournament.

Petra Marčinko and Lola Radivojević won the title, defeating Živa Falkner and Tara Würth in the final, 7–6^{(7–5)}, 6–4.

== Seeds ==
1. (Italy) Anastasia Abbagnato / (Greece) Sapfo Sakellaridi (quarterfinals)
2. (Romania) Cristina Dinu / (Greece) Valentini Grammatikopoulou (quarterfinals)
3. (Kazakhstan) Zhibek Kulambayeva / (Japan) Yuki Naito (first round)
4. (Bulgaria) Lia Karatancheva / (Bulgaria) Isabella Shinikova (withdrew)

== Draw ==
=== Key ===
- Q = Qualifier
- WC = Wild card
- LL = Lucky loser
- Alt = Alternate
- ITF = ITF entry
- PR = Protected ranking
- SR = Special ranking
- SE = Special exempt
- JE = Junior exempt
- JR = Junior Accelerator Programme entrant
- CO = College Accelerator Programme entrant
- NG = Next Gen Accelerator Program entrant
- w/o = Walkover
- r = Retired
- d = Defaulted

First round
1	(Italy) A Abbagnato (Greece) S Sakellaridi	6	6
(Serbia) N Senić (Serbia) A Stanković	3	1
(Spain) Á Fita Boluda (Switzerland) Y In-Albon	4	2
(Slovenia) Ž Falkner (Croatia) T Würth	6	6
Alt	(Netherlands) L Ebeling Koning (Netherlands) S van Emst	7	6
WC	(Estonia) G Gull (China) J Han	5	3
WC	(United States) G Kondos (Serbia) L Stojanović	0	0
D Lodikova; E Ovcharenko	6	6
WC	E Burdina (Greece) E Korokozidi	6	6
E Maklakova; A Zolotareva	0	4
(Croatia) P Marčinko (Serbia) L Radivojević	4	6	[10]
3	(Kazakhstan) Z Kulambayeva (Japan) Y Naito	6	4	[3]
A Gureva; A Shubladze	3	6	[10]
(Greece) M Matoula (Romania) A Prisăcariu	6	2	[7]
(Finland) L Hietaranta; T Prozorova	6	4	[8]
2	(Romania) C Dinu (Greece) V Grammatikopoulou	2	6	[10]

Quarterfinals
1	(Italy) A Abbagnato (Greece) S Sakellaridi	3	6^{7}
(Slovenia) Ž Falkner (Croatia) T Würth	6	7^{9}
Alt	(Netherlands) L Ebeling Koning (Netherlands) S van Emst	6	6
D Lodikova; E Ovcharenko	2	3
WC	E Burdina (Greece) E Korokozidi	3	6	[8]
(Croatia) P Marčinko (Serbia) L Radivojević	6	2	[10]
A Gureva; A Shubladze	6	2	[10]
2	(Romania) C Dinu (Greece) V Grammatikopoulou	1	6	[7]

Semifinals
(Slovenia) Ž Falkner (Croatia) T Würth	6	6
Alt	(Netherlands) L Ebeling Koning (Netherlands) S van Emst	0	2
(Croatia) P Marčinko (Serbia) L Radivojević	4	6	[10]
A Gureva; A Shubladze	6	4	[7]

Final
(Slovenia) Ž Falkner (Croatia) T Würth	6^{5}	4
(Croatia) P Marčinko (Serbia) L Radivojević	7^{7}	6
