= 2025 French Open – Women's singles qualifying =

Women's singles qualifying
- 2025 French Open

Events
Singles	men	women		boys	girls
Doubles	men	women	mixed	boys	girls
WC Singles	men	women	quad	boys	girls
WC Doubles	men	women	quad	boys	girls

Qualification
Singles	men	women
- French Open

The 2025 French Open – Women's singles qualifying was a series of tennis matches that took place from 19 to 23 May 2025 to determine the sixteen qualifiers into the main draw of the women's singles tournament.

Former doubles world No. 1 and singles world No. 5 (as well as 2012 finalist) Sara Errani played her last professional singles match, losing in the second round to Anna-Lena Friedsam. This was also the first time 2019 US Open champion Bianca Andreescu contested the qualifying competition of a major since the 2019 Australian Open, also losing in the second round to Nao Hibino.

Only 16 out of the 128 qualifiers who compete in this knock-out tournament, secure a main draw place.

== Seeds ==
All seeds are per WTA rankings as of 5 May 2025.

1. (Ukraine) Yuliia Starodubtseva (qualifying competition, lucky loser)
2. (Hungary) Dalma Gálfi (second round)
3. Aliaksandra Sasnovich (second round)
4. (Japan) Aoi Ito (first round)
5. (Thailand) Mananchaya Sawangkaew (second round)
6. (United States) Taylor Townsend (qualifying competition, lucky loser)
7. (Canada) Rebecca Marino (first round)
8. Anastasia Zakharova (first round)
9. (Argentina) Solana Sierra (qualified)
10. (Switzerland) Rebeka Masarova (qualifying competition)
11. (Croatia) Petra Martić (first round)
12. (Germany) Ella Seidel (qualifying competition)
13. (Spain) Nuria Párrizas Díaz (first round)
14. (Croatia) Antonia Ružić (second round)
15. (United Kingdom) Harriet Dart (first round)
16. (United States) Varvara Lepchenko (qualifying competition)
17. (Canada) Bianca Andreescu (second round)
18. (Argentina) María Lourdes Carlé (qualified)
19. (Germany) Jule Niemeier (first round)
20. (Poland) Maja Chwalińska (second round)
21. (Latvia) Darja Semeņistaja (first round)
22. (United Kingdom) Francesca Jones (qualifying competition)
23. (Australia) Talia Gibson (second round)
24. (Canada) Marina Stakusic (second round)
25. (China) Wei Sijia (first round)
26. (Australia) Daria Saville (qualified)
27. (Spain) Leyre Romero Gormaz (qualified)
28. (Andorra) Victoria Jiménez Kasintseva (first round)
29. (China) Wang Xiyu (qualifying competition)
30. (China) Zhang Shuai (second round)
31. (Japan) Ena Shibahara (second round)
32. (France) Jessika Ponchet (first round)

== Qualifiers ==
1. (Czech Republic) Sára Bejlek
2. (Czech Republic) Tereza Valentová
3. (Italy) Lucrezia Stefanini
4. (Chinese Taipei) Joanna Garland
5. (Spain) Leyre Romero Gormaz
6. (Australia) Daria Saville
7. (Canada) Victoria Mboko
8. (Argentina) María Lourdes Carlé
9. (Argentina) Solana Sierra
10. (Germany) Tamara Korpatsch
11. (France) Carole Monnet
12. (Japan) Nao Hibino
13. (Argentina) Julia Riera
14. Oksana Selekhmeteva
15. (Ukraine) Anastasiia Sobolieva
16. (Serbia) Nina Stojanović

== Lucky losers ==
1. (United States) Taylor Townsend
2. (Ukraine) Yuliia Starodubtseva

== Draw ==
Key

- Q = Qualifier
- WC = Wild card
- LL = Lucky loser
- Alt = Alternate
- ITF = ITF entry
- PR = Protected ranking
- SR = Special ranking
- SE = Special exempt
- JE = Junior exempt
- JR = Junior Accelerator Programme entrant
- CO = College Accelerator Programme entrant
- NG = Next Gen Accelerator Program entrant
- w/o = Walkover
- r = Retired
- d = Defaulted

=== First qualifier ===
First round
1	(Ukraine) Yuliia Starodubtseva	6	6
(Belgium) Hanne Vandewinkel	3	1
(Czech Republic) Dominika Šalková	1	5
(Slovenia) Tamara Zidanšek	6	7
(Germany) Mona Barthel	0	4
(Czech Republic) Sára Bejlek	6	6
WC	(France) Jenny Lim	4	1
31	(Japan) Ena Shibahara	6	6

Second round
1	(Ukraine) Yuliia Starodubtseva	3	6	6
(Slovenia) Tamara Zidanšek	6	2	3
(Czech Republic) Sára Bejlek	7	2	7^{12}
31	(Japan) Ena Shibahara	5	6	6^{10}

Qualifying competition
1	(Ukraine) Yuliia Starodubtseva	0	4
(Czech Republic) Sára Bejlek	6	6

=== Second qualifier ===
First round
2	(Hungary) Dalma Gálfi	6	6
(Romania) Ana Bogdan	3	4
(Australia) Arina Rodionova	2	2
(Czech Republic) Tereza Valentová	6	6
(Cyprus) Raluca Șerban	3	5
(Switzerland) Simona Waltert	6	7
PR	(Australia) Storm Hunter	3	2
30	(China) Zhang Shuai	6	6

Second round
2	(Hungary) Dalma Gálfi	4	1
(Czech Republic) Tereza Valentová	6	6
(Switzerland) Simona Waltert	6	6
30	(China) Zhang Shuai	4	3

Qualifying competition
(Czech Republic) Tereza Valentová	6	6
(Switzerland) Simona Waltert	2	4

=== Third qualifier ===
First round
3	Aliaksandra Sasnovich	6	6
Tatiana Prozorova	4	3
(France) Manon Léonard	6^{7}	4
(Italy) Lucrezia Stefanini	7^{9}	6
(Netherlands) Arianne Hartono	4	3
(Italy) Nuria Brancaccio	6	6
(Slovenia) Veronika Erjavec	2	6	6
21	(Latvia) Darja Semeņistaja	6	3	4

Second round
3	Aliaksandra Sasnovich	1	6	3
(Italy) Lucrezia Stefanini	6	1	6
(Italy) Nuria Brancaccio	6^{5}	1
(Slovenia) Veronika Erjavec	7^{7}	6

Qualifying competition
(Italy) Lucrezia Stefanini	6	6
(Slovenia) Veronika Erjavec	3	2

=== Fourth qualifier ===
First round
4	(Japan) Aoi Ito	5	2
(Croatia) Petra Marčinko	7	6
(Switzerland) Céline Naef	6^{3}	3
(Chinese Taipei) Joanna Garland	7^{7}	6
WC	(France) Ksenia Efremova	1	5
PR	(Germany) Anna-Lena Friedsam	6	7
(Italy) Sara Errani	0	7^{7}	6
19	(Germany) Jule Niemeier	6	6^{4}	2

Second round
(Croatia) Petra Marčinko	3	4
(Chinese Taipei) Joanna Garland	6	6
PR	(Germany) Anna-Lena Friedsam	1	6	7^{10}
(Italy) Sara Errani	6	0	6^{7}

Qualifying competition
(Chinese Taipei) Joanna Garland	6	7
PR	(Germany) Anna-Lena Friedsam	4	5

=== Fifth qualifier ===
First round
5	(Thailand) Mananchaya Sawangkaew	6	6
(Australia) Lizette Cabrera	4	2
(Czech Republic) Linda Fruhvirtová	4	4
(Poland) Linda Klimovičová	6	6
(Australia) Astra Sharma	6	6
(United States) Emina Bektas	0	0
PR	Darya Astakhova	1	1
27	(Spain) Leyre Romero Gormaz	6	6

Second round
5	(Thailand) Mananchaya Sawangkaew	2	3
(Poland) Linda Klimovičová	6	6
(Australia) Astra Sharma	6^{5}	2
27	(Spain) Leyre Romero Gormaz	7^{7}	6

Qualifying competition
(Poland) Linda Klimovičová	4	4
27	(Spain) Leyre Romero Gormaz	6	6

=== Sixth qualifier ===
First round
6	(United States) Taylor Townsend	7^{7}	7^{8}
(Japan) Sara Saito	6^{1}	6^{6}
(Switzerland) Leonie Küng	4	0
(United States) Hanna Chang	6	6
WC	(France) Daphnée Mpetshi Perricard	6	6
(Czech Republic) Gabriela Knutson	4	3
(United Kingdom) Heather Watson	6^{2}	2
26	(Australia) Daria Saville	7^{7}	6

Second round
6	(United States) Taylor Townsend	4	6	7
(United States) Hanna Chang	6	3	5
WC	(France) Daphnée Mpetshi Perricard	2	1
26	(Australia) Daria Saville	6	6

Qualifying competition
6	(United States) Taylor Townsend	6	2	4
26	(Australia) Daria Saville	2	6	6

=== Seventh qualifier ===
First round
7	(Canada) Rebecca Marino	1	0
(Liechtenstein) Kathinka von Deichmann	6	6
(Canada) Victoria Mboko	6	6
(Austria) Sinja Kraus	4	2
(Thailand) Lanlana Tararudee	5	3
PR	(Slovenia) Kaja Juvan	7	6
WC	(France) Cindy Langlais	4	6	0
20	(Poland) Maja Chwalińska	6	4	6

Second round
(Liechtenstein) Kathinka von Deichmann	3	2
(Canada) Victoria Mboko	6	6
PR	(Slovenia) Kaja Juvan	6	4	6
20	(Poland) Maja Chwalińska	3	6	2

Qualifying competition
(Canada) Victoria Mboko	7	6
PR	(Slovenia) Kaja Juvan	5	3

=== Eighth qualifier ===
First round
8	Anastasia Zakharova	7^{8}	5	6^{9}
(Netherlands) Anouk Koevermans	6^{6}	7	7^{11}
(Lithuania) Justina Mikulskytė	6	7^{7}
Ekaterina Makarova	4	6^{4}
(France) Tessah Andrianjafitrimo	4	3
(Poland) Katarzyna Kawa	6	6
WC	(France) Eleejah Inisan	2	1
18	(Argentina) María Lourdes Carlé	6	6

Second round
(Netherlands) Anouk Koevermans	6^{3}	2
(Lithuania) Justina Mikulskytė	7^{7}	6
(Poland) Katarzyna Kawa	6	4	2
18	(Argentina) María Lourdes Carlé	4	6	6

Qualifying competition
(Lithuania) Justina Mikulskytė	0	1
18	(Argentina) María Lourdes Carlé	6	6

=== Ninth qualifier ===
First round
9	(Argentina) Solana Sierra	7^{7}	6
(Switzerland) Susan Bandecchi	6^{5}	3
(Georgia (country)) Mariam Bolkvadze	3	0
(Ukraine) Daria Snigur	6	6
(Spain) Guiomar Maristany	4	6	7^{10}
(Czech Republic) Barbora Palicová	6	2	6^{3}
(France) Séléna Janicijevic	6	1	2
29	(China) Wang Xiyu	1	6	6

Second round
9	(Argentina) Solana Sierra	6	6
(Ukraine) Daria Snigur	2	2
(Spain) Guiomar Maristany	6^{8}	3
29	(China) Wang Xiyu	7^{10}	6

Qualifying competition
9	(Argentina) Solana Sierra	6	6
29	(China) Wang Xiyu	3	2

=== Tenth qualifier ===
First round
10	(Switzerland) Rebeka Masarova	6	6
(Israel) Lina Glushko	0	2
(Canada) Carson Branstine	6	6
(United States) Whitney Osuigwe	4	2
(United States) Louisa Chirico	4	6	3
(Germany) Tamara Korpatsch	6	4	6
(United States) Lauren Davis	4	4
24	(Canada) Marina Stakusic	6	6

Second round
10	(Switzerland) Rebeka Masarova	6	6
(Canada) Carson Branstine	0	3
(Germany) Tamara Korpatsch	6	6
24	(Canada) Marina Stakusic	2	1

Qualifying competition
10	(Switzerland) Rebeka Masarova	2	6^{2}
(Germany) Tamara Korpatsch	6	7^{7}

=== Eleventh qualifier ===
First round
11	(Croatia) Petra Martić	6	5	5
WC	(France) Carole Monnet	2	7	7
(Brazil) Laura Pigossi	2	5
PR	(France) Fiona Ferro	6	7
Iryna Shymanovich	1	1
(Australia) Maddison Inglis	6	6
Kristina Dmitruk	6	7
25	(China) Wei Sijia	1	5

Second round
WC	(France) Carole Monnet	7	6
PR	(France) Fiona Ferro	5	2
(Australia) Maddison Inglis	5	3
Kristina Dmitruk	7	6

Qualifying competition
WC	(France) Carole Monnet	6	6
Kristina Dmitruk	4	4

=== Twelfth qualifier ===
First round
12	(Germany) Ella Seidel	6	0	6
PR	(Switzerland) Stefanie Vögele	3	6	3
(Japan) Sayaka Ishii	2	1
(Hungary) Panna Udvardy	6	6
(Japan) Nao Hibino	7^{7}	6
(Spain) Andrea Lázaro García	6^{4}	4
(China) Yao Xinxin	0	0
17	(Canada) Bianca Andreescu	6	6

Second round
12	(Germany) Ella Seidel	3	6	6
(Hungary) Panna Udvardy	6	2	3
(Japan) Nao Hibino	2	7^{7}	6
17	(Canada) Bianca Andreescu	6	6^{5}	4

Qualifying competition
12	(Germany) Ella Seidel	6	5	4
(Japan) Nao Hibino	2	7	6

=== Thirteenth qualifier ===
First round
13	(Spain) Nuria Párrizas Díaz	1	6^{9}
(Romania) Miriam Bulgaru	6	7^{11}
(Romania) Patricia Maria Țig	6	6
(Canada) Kayla Cross	4	2
(Argentina) Julia Riera	2	6	6
(Switzerland) Valentina Ryser	6	4	1
PR	(Romania) Mihaela Buzărnescu	2	3
23	(Australia) Talia Gibson	6	6

Second round
(Romania) Miriam Bulgaru	6	4	7
(Romania) Patricia Maria Țig	4	6	5
(Argentina) Julia Riera	6	6
23	(Australia) Talia Gibson	4	1

Qualifying competition
(Romania) Miriam Bulgaru	4	1
(Argentina) Julia Riera	6	6

=== Fourteenth qualifier ===
First round
14	(Croatia) Antonia Ružić	6	6
(United States) Hina Inoue	1	1
Oksana Selekhmeteva	6	6
(Japan) Kyōka Okamura	3	2
(Belgium) Sofia Costoulas	6	6
WC	(France) Yara Bartashevich	4	1
(Serbia) Lola Radivojević	6	6
32	(France) Jessika Ponchet	3	1

Second round
14	(Croatia) Antonia Ružić	3	3
Oksana Selekhmeteva	6	6
(Belgium) Sofia Costoulas	1	6	6^{9}
(Serbia) Lola Radivojević	6	3	7^{11}

Qualifying competition
Oksana Selekhmeteva	6	2	6
(Serbia) Lola Radivojević	4	6	4

=== Fifteenth qualifier ===
First round
15	(United Kingdom) Harriet Dart	1	2
(Ukraine) Anastasiia Sobolieva	6	6
(China) Shi Han	3	2
WC	(France) Julie Belgraver	6	6
Elena Pridankina	2	5
(Japan) Mai Hontama	6	7
(Croatia) Lea Bošković	2	3
22	(United Kingdom) Francesca Jones	6	6

Second round
(Ukraine) Anastasiia Sobolieva	6	6
WC	(France) Julie Belgraver	3	4
(Japan) Mai Hontama	6	3	4
22	(United Kingdom) Francesca Jones	2	6	6

Qualifying competition
(Ukraine) Anastasiia Sobolieva	6	0	6
22	(United Kingdom) Francesca Jones	0	6	2

=== Sixteenth qualifier ===
First round
16	(United States) Varvara Lepchenko	6	7
(Australia) Taylah Preston	4	5
(Croatia) Jana Fett	6	4	7^{12}
(Australia) Priscilla Hon	2	6	6^{10}
WC	(France) Margaux Rouvroy	6^{7}	7	7^{10}
(Japan) Haruka Kaji	7^{9}	5	6^{3}
(Serbia) Nina Stojanović	6	3	6
28	(Andorra) Victoria Jiménez Kasintseva	2	6	2

Second round
16	(United States) Varvara Lepchenko	1	6	6
(Croatia) Jana Fett	6	4	3
WC	(France) Margaux Rouvroy	6	5	5
(Serbia) Nina Stojanović	3	7	7

Qualifying competition
16	(United States) Varvara Lepchenko	6	1	5
(Serbia) Nina Stojanović	4	6	7
