= Serbian Tennis Tour =

- 2024 Serbian Tennis Tour 2

Women's World Tennis Tour
- Event name: Serbian Tennis Tour
- Location: Kuršumlijska Banja, Serbia
- Venue: Tennis Club T Line
- Category: ITF Women's World Tennis Tour
- Surface: Clay
- Draw: 48S/32Q/16D
- Prize money: $60,000
- Website: Official website

The Serbian Tennis Tour is a tournament for professional female tennis players played on outdoor clay courts. The event is classified as a $60,000 ITF Women's World Tennis Tour tournament and has been held in Kuršumlijska Banja, Serbia, since 2024.

== Past finals ==
=== Singles ===
| Year | Champion | Runner-up | Score |
|---|---|---|---|
| 2026 (3) | Rada Zolotareva | (Bulgaria) Lidia Encheva | 6–4, 6–1 |
| 2026 (2) | (Serbia) Mia Ristić | (Bulgaria) Rositsa Dencheva | 6–0, 7–6^{(7–4)} |
| 2026 (1) | (Czech Republic) Laura Samson | (Serbia) Lola Radivojević | 6–3, 3–6, 7–5 |
| 2025 (3) | (Austria) Lilli Tagger | Rada Zolotareva | 5–7, 6–2, 6–2 |
| 2025 (2) | (Serbia) Teodora Kostović | (North Macedonia) Lina Gjorcheska | 7–5, 6–3 |
| 2025 (1) | Alina Charaeva | (Serbia) Teodora Kostović | 6–4, 7–6^{(7–5)} |
| 2024 (2) | (Serbia) Lola Radivojević | (Cyprus) Raluca Șerban | 6–2, 7–6^{(9–7)} |
| 2024 (1) | (Serbia) Lola Radivojević | (Czech Republic) Barbora Palicová | 6–4, 6–2 |

=== Doubles ===
| Year | Champions | Runners-up | Score |
|---|---|---|---|
| 2026 (3) | Varvara Panshina; Rada Zolotareva | (Croatia) Lucija Ćirić Bagarić (Poland) Weronika Falkowska | 7–5, 6–4 |
| 2026 (2) | (Bulgaria) Rositsa Dencheva; Varvara Panshina | (China) Feng Shuo (China) Li Zongyu | 6–4, 7–5 |
| 2026 (1) | (Czech Republic) Michaela Bayerlová (Serbia) Elena Milovanović | (Kazakhstan) Zhibek Kulambayeva (Sweden) Lisa Zaar | 6–3, 6–4 |
| 2025 (3) | (Poland) Weronika Falkowska (Czech Republic) Anna Sisková | (Czech Republic) Michaela Bayerlová (Greece) Martha Matoula | 6–0, 7–5 |
| 2025 (2) | (Serbia) Natalija Senić (Serbia) Anja Stanković | (Portugal) Francisca Jorge (Portugal) Matilde Jorge | 6–2, 7–5 |
| 2025 (1) | (Turkey) Ayla Aksu (Czech Republic) Anna Sisková | (United Kingdom) Freya Christie (Kazakhstan) Zhibek Kulambayeva | 6–4, 6–2 |
| 2024 (2) | Amina Anshba (Germany) Noma Noha Akugue | (Romania) Cristina Dinu (Bulgaria) Lia Karatancheva | 6–2, 7–6^{(7–2)} |
| 2024 (1) | (Croatia) Petra Marčinko (Serbia) Lola Radivojević | (Slovenia) Živa Falkner (Croatia) Tara Würth | 7–6^{(7–5)}, 6–4 |
