= Lisa Zaar =

Swedish tennis player (born 2000)

- Country (sports): Sweden
- Born: 30 April 2000 (age 26) Enskede, Sweden
- Plays: Right (two-handed backhand)
- Prize money: $105,070

Singles
- Career record: 146–98
- Career titles: 2 ITF
- Highest ranking: No. 276 (19 October 2026)
- Current ranking: No. 281 (9 November 2026)

Doubles
- Career record: 135–62
- Career titles: 22 ITF
- Highest ranking: No. 155 (2 November 2026)
- Current ranking: No. 158 (9 November 2026)

Team competitions
- BJK Cup: 4–5
- Last updated on: 15 November 2026.

Lisa Zaar (born 30 April 2000) is a Swedish tennis player. She has a career-high singles ranking of world No. 276 by the WTA, reached on 19 October 2026, and a best doubles ranking of No. 155, achieved on 2 November 2026. Zaar has won two singles and 22 doubles titles on the ITF Circuit.

She studied at Pepperdine University in Malibu, California and played tennis on the Pepperdine Waves team from 2019 until 2024, her final season.

== Early life ==
Zaar was born in Enskede. She started playing at Enskede Lawn Tennis club. In 2019, she was chosen as the young child of the year by the Royal Lawn Tennis Club in Sweden.

== Career ==
In October 2023, she won the doubles title with her partner Caijsa Hennemann at the W15 tournament held in Näsbypark.

In October 2024, she became champion in both singles and doubles at the W15 tournament held in Täby. In November, partnering Martyna Kubka, Zaar won her first W50 tournament in Sëlva Gardena, Italy, defeating Carolina Kuhl and Mia Ristić in the final.

Zaar made her WTA Tour main-draw debut as a qualifier at the 2026 Morocco Open, losing in the first round to second seed Jéssica Bouzas Maneiro, in straight sets.

== WTA 125 finals ==
=== Doubles: 1 (runner-up) ===
Result	W–L	Date	Tournament	Surface	Partner	Opponents	Score
Loss	0–1	Oct 2026	Courmayeur Ladies Open, Italy	Hard (i)	(United Kingdom) Madeleine Brooks	(United States) Catherine Harrison (United States) Dalayna Hewitt	4–6, 4–6

== ITF Circuit finals ==
=== Singles: 5 (2 titles, 3 runner-ups) ===
Legend W35 tournaments W15 tournaments	Finals by surface Hard (1–1) Clay (1–2)

Result	W–L	Date	Tournament	Tier	Surface	Opponent	Score
Win	1–0	Nov 2023	ITF Antalya, Turkey	W15	Clay	(Serbia) Natalija Senić	6–2, 6–1
Loss	1–1	May 2024	ITF San Diego, United States	W15	Hard	(South Africa) Gabriella Broadfoot	2–6, 6–7^{(2)}
Loss	1–2	Jul 2024	ITF Kuršumlijska Banja, Serbia	W15	Clay	(Kazakhstan) Zhibek Kulambayeva	6–2, 4–6, 2–6
Win	2–2	Oct 2024	ITF Täby, Sweden	W15	Hard (i)	(Netherlands) Stéphanie Visscher	3–6, 6–1, 6–4
Loss	2–3	Oct 2026	ITF Santa Margherita di Pula, Italy	W35	Clay	(Germany) Joëlle Steur	6–7^{(1)}, 6–3, 6–7^{(3)}

=== Doubles: 33 (23 titles, 10 runner-ups) ===
Legend W100 tournaments W75 tournaments W50 tournaments W25/35 tournaments W15 tournaments	Finals by surface Hard (10–2) Clay (13–8)

Result	W–L	Date	Tournament	Tier	Surface	Partner	Opponents	Score
Loss	0–1	Oct 2018	ITF Antalya, Turkey	W15	Hard	(Sweden) Alexandra Viktorovitch	(Latvia) Alise Čerņecka (Finland) Oona Orpana	4–6, 6–7^{(6)}
Win	1–1	Oct 2018	ITF Stockholm, Sweden	W15	Hard (i)	(Sweden) Alexandra Viktorovitch	(Finland) Anastasia Kulikova (Estonia) Elena Malõgina	7–5, 7–5
Loss	1–2	Jun 2022	ITF Ystad, Sweden	W25	Clay	(United States) Ashley Lahey	(Sweden) Caijsa Hennemann (Poland) Martyna Kubka	6–4, 5–7, [7–10]
Loss	1–3	Aug 2022	ITF Danderyd, Sweden	W25	Clay	(United States) Ashley Lahey	(Japan) Rina Saigo (Japan) Yukina Saigo	6–2, 5–7, [7–10]
Loss	1–4	Aug 2023	ITF Malmö, Sweden	W25	Clay	(Sweden) Jacqueline Cabaj Awad	(Netherlands) Suzan Lamens (Netherlands) Lexie Stevens	4–6, 1–6
Win	2–4	Oct 2023	ITF Reims, France	W25	Hard (i)	(Poland) Martyna Kubka	Julia Avdeeva; Anna Chekanskaya	6–3, 6–2
Win	3–4	Oct 2023	ITF Näsbypark, Sweden	W15	Hard (i)	(Sweden) Caijsa Hennemann	(Ukraine) Daria Lopatetska (Ukraine) Daria Yesypchuk	5–7, 6–1, [10–6]
Loss	3–5	May 2024	ITF San Diego, United States	W15	Hard	(United States) Dasha Ivanova	(United States) Haley Giavara (United States) Kelly Keller	6–2, 2–6, [5–10]
Win	4–5	Jun 2024	ITF San Diego, United States	W15	Hard	(United States) Carolyn Campana	(United States) Eryn Cayetano (Australia) Lily Fairclough	6–7^{(3)}, 6–4, [11–9]
Win	5–5	Jul 2024	ITF Kuršumlijska Banja, Serbia	W15	Clay	(New Zealand) Valentina Ivanov	(Czech Republic) Michaela Bayerlová (Australia) Jelena Cvijanovic	6–4, 6–7^{(1)}, [10–8]
Win	6–5	Jul 2024	ITF Brežice, Slovenia	W15	Clay	(Slovenia) Kristina Novak	Victoria Borodulina (Czech Republic) Emma Slavíková	6–2, 6–2
Loss	6–6	Aug 2024	ITF Erwitte, Germany	W35	Clay	(Slovenia) Kristina Novak	(Germany) Fabienne Gettwart (Japan) Erika Sema	4–6, 4–6
Win	7–6	Aug 2024	ITF Malmö, Sweden	W15	Clay	(United States) India Houghton	(Denmark) Sarafina Hansen (Norway) Carina Syrtveit	4–6, 6–2, [10–4]
Win	8–6	Sep 2024	ITF Santa Margherita di Pula, Italy	W35	Clay	(Poland) Daria Kuczer	(Italy) Silvia Ambrosio (Czech Republic) Julie Štruplová	walkover
Win	9–6	Oct 2024	ITF Santa Margherita di Pula, Italy	W35	Clay	(Greece) Sapfo Sakellaridi	(Romania) Andreea Prisacariu (Italy) Federica Urgesi	6–3, 6–4
Win	10–6	Oct 2024	Täby, Sweden	W15	Hard (i)	(Netherlands) Stéphanie Visscher	(Switzerland) Marie Mettraux (Ukraine) Daria Yesypchuk	6–0, 7–5
Win	11–6	Nov 2024	ITF Sëlva Gardena, Italy	W50	Hard (i)	(Poland) Martyna Kubka	(Germany) Carolina Kuhl (Serbia) Mia Ristić	6–3, 6–0
Win	12–6	Dec 2024	Internazionali Val Gardena, Italy	W35	Hard (i)	(Poland) Weronika Falkowska	Ekaterina Ovcharenko (United Kingdom) Emily Webley-Smith	6–4, 1–6, [12–10]
Win	13–6	Jan 2025	ITF Palm Coast, United States	W35	Clay	(Netherlands) Jasmijn Gimbrère	(United States) Ayana Akli (United States) Abigail Rencheli	6–4, 3–6, [10–8]
Win	14–6	Mar 2025	Open Nantes Atlantique, France	W50	Hard (i)	(Poland) Martyna Kubka	(Belgium) Sofia Costoulas (Australia) Talia Gibson	6–3, 6–2
Win	15–6	Apr 2025	ITF Calvi, France	W75	Hard	(Bulgaria) Lia Karatancheva	(India) Riya Bhatia (Burundi) Sada Nahimana	6–4, 6–3
Loss	15–7	May 2025	ITF Båstad, Sweden	W35	Clay	Anastasia Tikhonova	(Colombia) Yuliana Lizarazo (Colombia) María Paulina Pérez	3–6, 2–6
Win	16–7	Jul 2025	ITF Turin, Italy	W35	Clay	(Greece) Valentini Grammatikopoulou	(Italy) Noemi Basiletti (Italy) Federica Urgesi	6–3, 7–6^{(3)}
Win	17–7	Jul 2025	ITF Mohammedia, Morocco	W35	Clay	Anastasia Tikhonova	(Japan) Rinko Matsuda (Italy) Sofia Rocchetti	6–2, 6–2
Win	18–7	Sep 2025	ITF Santa Margherita di Pula, Italy	W35	Clay	(Sweden) Caijsa Hennemann	(Italy) Noemi Basiletti (Italy) Gaia Maduzzi	6–3, 6–3
Win	19–7	Oct 2025	ITF Santa Margherita di Pula, Italy	W35	Clay	(Germany) Katharina Hobgarski	(Morocco) Yasmine Kabbaj (France) Mathilde Lollia	6–3, 6–4
Win	20–7	Oct 2025	ITF Santa Margherita di Pula, Italy	W35	Clay	(Greece) Martha Matoula	(Serbia) Anja Stanković (Switzerland) Katerina Tsygourova	6–1, 4–6, [13–11]
Win	21–7	Mar 2026	ITF Helsinki, Finland	W50	Hard (i)	(Sweden) Caijsa Hennemann	(United Kingdom) Emily Appleton (Slovakia) Viktória Hrunčáková	2–6, 6–3, [10–8]
Loss	21–8	Apr 2026	ITF Portorož, Slovenia	W75	Clay	(United States) Rasheeda McAdoo	(Slovakia) Viktória Hrunčáková (Czech Republic) Anna Sisková	2–6, 4–6
Win	22–8	May 2026	Open Saint-Gaudens, France	W75	Clay	(Sweden) Caijsa Hennemann	(Brazil) Ingrid Martins; Ekaterina Ovcharenko	6–7^{(5)}, 7–5, [10–7]
Loss	22–9	May 2026	Serbian Tennis Tour, Serbia	W75	Clay	(Kazakhstan) Zhibek Kulambayeva	(Czech Republic) Michaela Bayerlová (Serbia) Elena Milovanović	3–6, 4–6
Loss	22–10	Jul 2026	ITF Gran Canaria, Spain	W100	Clay	(Czech Republic) Dominika Šalková	(Kazakhstan) Zhibek Kulambayeva (Czech Republic) Anna Sisková	3–6, 6–7^{(3)}
Win	23–10	Oct 2026	ITF Santa Margherita di Pula, Italy	W35	Clay	(Italy) Giorgia Pedone	(France) Nina Radovanovic (Serbia) Natalija Senić	7–6^{(6)}, 6–7^{(3)}, [10–4]
