= Elena Milovanović =

Serbian tennis player

- Country (sports): Serbia
- Residence: Čačak, Serbia
- Born: 31 January 2001 (age 25) Kraljevo, Serbia, FR Yugoslavia
- Plays: Right (two-handed backhand)
- Prize money: $102,761

Singles
- Career record: 223–167
- Career titles: 5 ITF
- Highest ranking: No. 357 (26 October 2026)
- Current ranking: No. 357 (26 October 2026)

Doubles
- Career record: 177–84
- Career titles: 18 ITF
- Highest ranking: No. 186 (26 October 2026)
- Current ranking: No. 186 (26 October 2026)

Team competitions
- Fed Cup: 1–4
- Last updated on: 26 October 2026.

Elena Milovanović (Serbian Cyrillic: Елена Миловановић; born 31 January 2001) is a Serbian tennis player.

Milovanović has career-high WTA rankings of No. 357 in singles, reached on 26 October 2026, and 186 in doubles, achieved on the same date. She has won 18 titles in doubles and five in singles on the ITF World Tennis Tour.

Milovanović was born in Kraljevo, started playing tennis at the age of eight and resides in Čačak.

She won Serbian national team championships with TC Novak for three years in a row, from 2020 to 2022.

Milovanović also has represented Serbia in the Billie Jean King Cup, where she has a win-loss record of 1–4.

== ITF Circuit finals ==
=== Singles: 12 (5 titles, 7 runner-ups) ===
Legend W35 tournaments W15 tournaments	Finals by surface Hard (5–7)

Result	W–L	Date	Tournament	Tier	Surface	Opponent	Score
Loss	0–1	Sep 2021	ITF Monastir, Tunisia	W15	Hard	(Thailand) Anchisa Chanta	6–7^{(4)}, 3–6
Loss	0–2	Mar 2023	ITF Monastir, Tunisia	W15	Hard	(Spain) Noelia Bouzó Zanotti	3–6, 1–6
Win	1–2	Apr 2023	ITF Monastir, Tunisia	W15	Hard	(Germany) Mara Guth	7–6^{(5)}, 6–3
Loss	1–3	Sep 2023	ITF Monastir, Tunisia	W15	Hard	(Belgium) Amelia Waligora	6–3, 3–6, 1–6
Loss	1–4	Mar 2024	ITF Monastir, Tunisia	W15	Hard	(Slovakia) Radka Zelníčková	2–6, 2–4 ret.
Loss	1–5	Mar 2024	ITF Monastir, Tunisia	W15	Hard	Evialina Laskevich	1–6, 1–6
Loss	1–6	Mar 2025	ITF Monastir, Tunisia	W15	Hard	(Netherlands) Sarah van Emst	6–7^{(8)}, 4–6
Win	2–6	Aug 2025	ITF Monastir, Tunisia	W15	Hard	(China) Mi Lan	6–1, 6–7^{(4)}, 6–2
Win	3–6	Apr 2026	ITF Monastir, Tunisia	W15	Hard	(Bulgaria) Iva Ivanova	4–6, 6–2, 7–6^{(3)}
Win	4–6	May 2026	ITF Monastir, Tunisia	W35	Hard	(United States) Carolyn Ansari	6–1, 7–5
Win	5–6	Oct 2026	ITF Monastir, Tunisia	W35	Hard	(India) Vaishnavi Adkar	6–3, 7–5
Loss	5–7	Oct 2026	ITF Monastir, Tunisia	W35	Hard	(Japan) Kayo Nishimura	4–6, 1–6

=== Doubles: 40 (18 titles, 22 runner-ups) ===
Legend W100 tournaments (0–1) W75 tournaments (1–0) W50 tournaments (2–0) W25/35 tournaments (4–3) W15 tournaments (11–18)	Finals by surface Hard (12–16) Clay (6–6)

Result	W–L	Date	Tournament	Tier	Surface	Partner	Opponents	Score
Win	1–0	Mar 2019	ITF Antalya, Turkey	W15	Clay	(Ukraine) Viktoriia Dema	(Italy) Enola Chiesa (Italy) Valentina Losciale	6–4, 6–3
Loss	1–1	Jun 2019	ITF Banja Luka, BiH	W15	Clay	(Czech Republic) Barbora Miklová	(Bosnia and Herzegovina) Nefisa Berberović (Slovenia) Veronika Erjavec	1–6, 3–6
Loss	1–2	Aug 2019	ITF Tabarka, Tunisia	W15	Clay	(Italy) Anna Turati	(Spain) Ángela Fita Boluda (Romania) Oana Gavrilă	3–6, 6–4, [5–10]
Win	2–2	Aug 2019	ITF Tabarka, Tunisia	W15	Clay	(Slovakia) Katarína Kužmová	(Italy) Beatrice Lombardo (Egypt) Sandra Samir	3–6, 6–3, [10–7]
Win	3–2	Feb 2020	ITF Cairo, Egypt	W15	Clay	(Serbia) Tamara Čurović	(Russia) Anna Morgina (Russia) Anastasia Zolotareva	6–2, 2–6, [10–2]
Loss	3–3	Feb 2021	ITF Monastir, Tunisia	W15	Hard	(France) Yasmine Mansouri	(Poland) Weronika Falkowska (Czech Republic) Linda Fruhvirtová	3–6, 1–6
Loss	3–4	Jun 2021	ITF Banja Luka, BiH	W15	Clay	(Slovakia) Katarína Kužmová	(Italy) Nicole Fossa Huergo (Serbia) Bojana Marinković	2–6, 6–3, [8–10]
Loss	3–5	Sep 2021	ITF Monastir, Tunisia	W15	Hard	(Bolivia) Noelia Zeballos	(South Korea) Choi Ji-hee (South Korea) Jeong Yeong-won	4–6, 6–3, [5–10]
Loss	3–6	Sep 2021	ITF Monastir, Tunisia	W15	Hard	(United States) Dalayna Hewitt	(India) Sharmada Balu (India) Sravya Shivani Chilakalapudi	5–7, 3–6
Win	4–6	Nov 2021	ITF Monastir, Tunisia	W15	Hard	(France) Yasmine Mansouri	(Croatia) Mariana Dražić (Germany) Julia Middendorf	7–6^{(4)}, 6–0
Win	5–6	Mar 2022	ITF Monastir, Tunisia	W15	Hard	(Belgium) Eliessa Vanlangendonck	(Japan) Anri Nagata (Japan) Kisa Yoshioka	6–4, 6–7^{(4)}, [10–3]
Loss	5–7	Jul 2022	ITF Monastir, Tunisia	W15	Hard	(Belgium) Eliessa Vanlangendonck	(China) Chen Mengyi (Czech Republic) Zdena Šafářová	5–7, 1–6
Win	6–7	Oct 2022	ITF Monastir, Tunisia	W15	Hard	(China) Wei Sijia	(Tunisia) Feryel Ben Hassen (Poland) Gina Feistel	6–4, 6–1
Loss	6–8	Feb 2023	ITF Monastir, Tunisia	W15	Hard	(Chile) Fernanda Labraña	(Chinese Taipei) Lee Ya-hsin (China) Liu Fangzhou	3–6, 6–7^{(12)}
Loss	6–9	Mar 2023	ITF Monastir, Tunisia	W15	Hard	(Chile) Fernanda Labraña	(Switzerland) Naïma Karamoko (Bulgaria) Isabella Shinikova	4–6, 6–3, [5–10]
Win	7–9	Apr 2023	ITF Monastir, Tunisia	W15	Hard	(Serbia) Dejana Radanović	(China) Jiaqi Wang (China) Yidi Yang	w/o
Win	8–9	Aug 2023	Vrnjačka Banja Open, Serbia	W25	Clay	(Australia) Ivana Popovic	(Italy) Diletta Cherubini (Finland) Laura Hietaranta	6–4, 6–1
Loss	8–10	Mar 2024	ITF Monastir, Tunisia	W15	Hard	(Austria) Tamira Paszek	(United Kingdom) Mingge Xu (Slovakia) Radka Zelníčková	4–6, 2–6
Loss	8–11	Mar 2024	ITF Monastir, Tunisia	W15	Hard	(Bulgaria) Isabella Shinikova	Evialina Laskevich (Slovakia) Radka Zelníčková	0–6, 1–6
Loss	8–12	Mar 2024	ITF Monastir, Tunisia	W15	Hard	(France) Yasmine Mansouri	(Germany) Selina Dal (Poland) Gina Feistel	6–3, 4–6, [1–10]
Loss	8–13	May 2024	ITF Kuršumlijska Banja, Serbia	W15	Clay	(Romania) Andreea Prisăcariu	(Romania) Karola Bejenaru (Algeria) Inès Ibbou	6–7^{(8)}, 7–6^{(6)}, [5–10]
Loss	8–14	Jun 2024	ITF Kuršumlijska Banja, Serbia	W35	Clay	(Algeria) Inès Ibbou	(Japan) Mana Kawamura (Japan) Yuki Naito	4–6, 4–6
Win	9–14	Jan 2025	ITF Monastir, Tunisia	W15	Hard	(Slovenia) Živa Falkner	Maria Golovina (Kazakhstan) Aruzhan Sagandikova	6–4, 6–4
Loss	9–15	Jan 2025	ITF Monastir, Tunisia	W15	Hard	(United States) Dalayna Hewitt	(Greece) Sapfo Sakellaridi (Slovakia) Radka Zelníčková	1–6, 3–6
Win	10–15	Feb 2025	ITF Monastir, Tunisia	W15	Hard	(France) Yasmine Mansouri	(India) Diva Bhatia (Greece) Sapfo Sakellaridi	6–2, 6–0
Loss	10–16	Mar 2025	ITF Monastir, Tunisia	W15	Hard	(France) Nina Radovanovic	(Netherlands) Britt du Pree (Netherlands) Sarah van Emst	3–6, 6–3, [7–10]
Loss	10–17	Aug 2025	ITF Monastir, Tunisia	W15	Hard	(France) Yasmine Mansouri	(Czech Republic) Alena Kovačková (Czech Republic) Jana Kovačková	6–7^{(2)}, 4–6
Loss	10–18	Aug 2025	ITF Monastir, Tunisia	W15	Hard	(United Kingdom) Lauryn John-Baptiste	(Italy) Caterina Odorizzi (Austria) Mavie Österreicher	4–6, 6–2, [10–12]
Win	11–18	Sep 2025	ITF Monastir, Tunisia	W35	Hard	(France) Yasmine Mansouri	(Switzerland) Alina Granwehr (Italy) Arianna Zucchini	6–1, 6–1
Loss	11–19	Oct 2025	ITF Lagos, Portugal	W35	Hard	(France) Yasmine Mansouri	(Italy) Vittoria Paganetti (France) Alice Tubello	5–7, 6–3, [4–10]
Loss	11–20	Jan 2026	ITF Monastir, Tunisia	W15	Hard	(France) Yasmine Mansouri	Kristina Dmitruk; Daria Khomutsianskaya	5–7, 5–7
Win	12–20	Jan 2026	ITF Monastir, Tunisia	W50	Hard	(France) Yasmine Mansouri	(Netherlands) Loes Ebeling Koning (Netherlands) Isis Louise van den Broek	6–2, 6–3
Win	13–20	Mar 2026	ITF Monastir, Tunisia	W15	Hard	(Netherlands) Sarah van Emst	Yuliya Hatouka; Anna Kubareva	6–2, 7–5
Loss	13–21	May 2026	ITF Monastir, Tunisia	W35	Hard	(France) Yasmine Mansouri	(Poland) Weronika Falkowska (Slovakia) Katarína Kužmová	4–6, 3–6
Win	14–21	May 2026	ITF Kuršumlijska Banja, Serbia	W75	Clay	(Czech Republic) Michaela Bayerlová	(Kazakhstan) Zhibek Kulambayeva (Sweden) Lisa Zaar	6–3, 6–4
Win	15–21	Jun 2026	ITF Kuršumlijska Banja, Serbia	W15	Clay	(Serbia) Natalija Senić	(Romania) Alexandra Irina Anghel; Mariia Masiianskaia	6–2, 6–4
Loss	15–22	Jul 2026	Schönbusch Open, Germany	W100	Clay	(Slovenia) Kristina Novak	(United States) Rasheeda McAdoo (Kenya) Angella Okutoyi	3–6, 3–6
Win	16–22	Sep 2026	ITF Yecla, Spain	W50	Hard	(Spain) Georgina García Pérez	(United States) Carson Tanguilig (Latvia) Elza Tomase	2–6, 6–4, [12–10]
Win	17–22	Sep 2026	ITF Baza, Spain	W35	Hard	(Slovenia) Kristina Novak	(Finland) Laura Hietaranta (Slovakia) Radka Zelníčková	6–1, 6–0
Win	18–22	Oct 2026	ITF Monastir, Tunisia	W35	Hard	(Slovakia) Katarína Kužmová	(United States) Isabella Barrera Aguirre (China) Zhu Chenting	6–3, 6–2
