= Barbora Palicová =

Czech tennis player (born 2004)

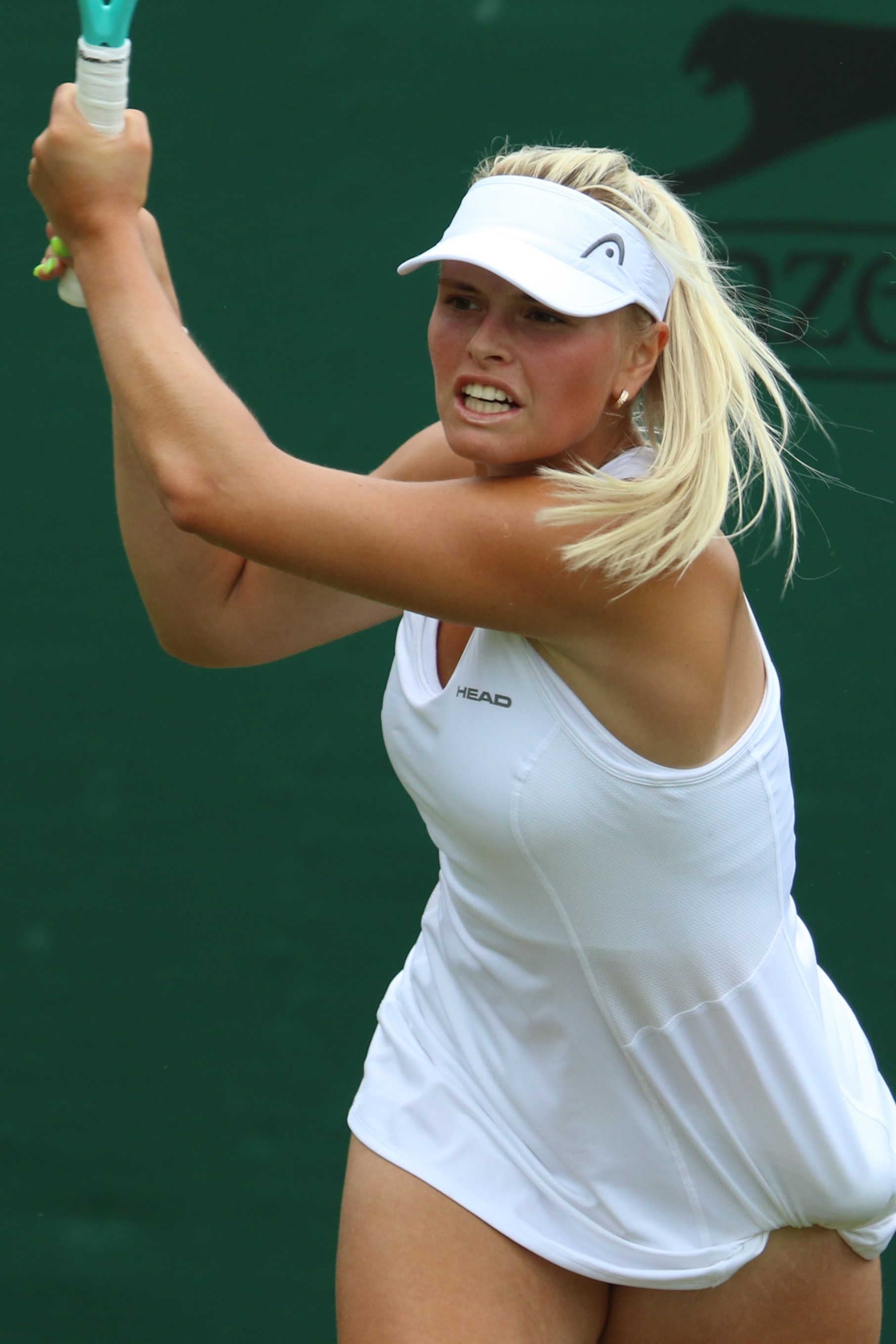
- Barbora Palicová in Wimbledon, 2023
- Country (sports): Czech Republic
- Born: 11 March 2004 (age 22) Neratovice, Czech Republic
- Height: 1.68 m (5 ft 6 in)
- Plays: Right-handed
- Prize money: $392,475

Singles
- Career record: 210–159
- Career titles: 4 ITF
- Highest ranking: No. 171 (16 June 2025)
- Current ranking: No. 311 (22 June 2026)

Grand Slam singles results
- Australian Open: Q2 (2023, 2025)
- French Open: Q2 (2023)
- Wimbledon: Q2 (2023, 2025)
- US Open: Q1 (2023, 2025)

Doubles
- Career record: 27–35
- Career titles: 0
- Highest ranking: No. 265 (7 August 2023)
- Current ranking: No. 770 (22 June 2026)
- Last updated on: 22 June 2026.

Barbora Palicová (Czech pronunciation: [ˈbarbora ˈpalɪtsovaː]; born 11 March 2004) is a Czech tennis player. She has a career-high WTA ranking of 171 in singles, achieved on 16 June 2025.

Palicová made her WTA Tour main-draw debut at the 2021 Prague Open, where she received a wildcard into the doubles tournament. She made her singles main-draw debut at the 2022 Prague Open, losing in the first round to Lucie Havlíčková. Given a wildcard entry into the 2025 Prague Open, Palicová defeated Priscilla Hon for her first WTA Tour main-draw win, before losing to Jessika Ponchet in the second round.

== Junior tour ==
Grand Slam performance - Singles:

- Australian Open: –
- French Open: 2R (2021)
- Wimbledon: 1R (2021)
- US Open: –

Grand Slam performance - Doubles:

- Australian Open: –
- French Open: 2R (2021)
- Wimbledon: 2R (2021)
- US Open: –

== Performance timelines ==
Key
W	F	SF	QF	#R	RR	Q#	P#	DNQ	A	Z#	PO	G	S	B	NMS	NTI	P	NH

(W) winner; (F) finalist; (SF) semifinalist; (QF) quarterfinalist; (#R) rounds 4, 3, 2, 1; (RR) round-robin stage; (Q#) qualification round; (P#) preliminary round; (DNQ) did not qualify; (A) absent; (Z#) Davis/Fed Cup Zonal Group (with number indication) or (PO) play-off; (G) gold, (S) silver or (B) bronze Olympic/Paralympic medal; (NMS) not a Masters tournament; (NTI) not a Tier I tournament; (P) postponed; (NH) not held; (SR) strike rate (events won / competed); (W–L) win–loss record.
To avoid confusion and double counting, these charts are updated at the conclusion of a tournament or when the player's participation has ended.

Only main-draw results in WTA Tour, Grand Slam tournaments, Billie Jean King Cup and Olympic Games are included in win–loss records.

=== Singles ===
Current through the 2023 Prague Open.

Tournament	2022	2023	2024	SR	W–L
Grand Slam tournaments
Australian Open	A	Q2	A	0 / 0	0–0
French Open	A	Q2	A	0 / 0	0–0
Wimbledon	A	Q2	A	0 / 0	0–0
US Open	A	Q1	A	0 / 0	0–0
Win–loss	0–0	0–0	0–0	0 / 0	0–0
Career statistics
Tournaments	1	1	Career total: 2		
Overall win–loss	0–1	0–1		0 / 2	0–2

=== Doubles ===
Current through the 2023 Prague Open.

Tournament	2021	2022	2023	SR	W–L
Grand Slam tournaments
Australian Open	A	A	A	0 / 0	0–0
French Open	A	A	A	0 / 0	0–0
Wimbledon	A	A	A	0 / 0	0–0
US Open	A	A	A	0 / 0	0–0
Win–loss	0–0	0–0	0–0	0 / 0	0–0
Career statistics
Tournaments	1	2	1	Career total: 4	
Overall win–loss	0–1	1–2	2–1	0 / 4	3–4

== WTA 125 finals ==
=== Singles: 1 (runner-up) ===
Result	W–L	Date	Tournament	Surface	Opponent	Score
Loss	0–1	Jun 2025	Grado Tennis Cup, Italy	Clay	(Czech Republic) Tereza Valentová	2–6, 6–4, 1–6

== ITF Circuit finals ==
=== Singles: 11 (5 titles, 6 runner-ups) ===
Legend W60/75 tournaments (3–2) W50 tournaments (1–2) W25 tournaments (0–1) W15 tournaments (1–1)	Finals by surface Hard (0–3) Clay (5–3)

Result	W–L	Date	Tournament	Tier	Surface	Opponent	Score
Loss	0–1	Jan 2022	ITF Antalya, Turkey	W15	Clay	(United States) Hurricane Tyra Black	0–6, 4–6
Win	1–1	Jan 2022	ITF Antalya, Turkey	W15	Clay	(Turkey) İlay Yörük	6–3, 7–6^{(7–2)}
Loss	1–2	Feb 2022	GB Pro-Series Glasgow, UK	W25	Hard (i)	(United Kingdom) Sonay Kartal	6–7^{(5–7)}, 5–7
Win	2–2	Aug 2022	Přerov Cup, Czech Republic	W60	Clay	(Burundi) Sada Nahimana	6–2, 1–6, 6–0
Loss	2–3	Feb 2024	ITF Edgbaston, United Kingdom	W50	Hard (i)	(Belgium) Magali Kempen	3–6, 6–7^{(6–8)}
Win	3–3	May 2024	ITF Otočec, Slovenia	W50	Clay	(Canada) Victoria Mboko	6–1, 2–6, 6–4
Loss	3–4	Aug 2024	ITF Kuršumlijska Banja, Serbia	W75	Clay	(Serbia) Lola Radivojević	4–6, 2–6
Loss	3–5	Oct 2024	ITF Cherbourg-en-Cotentin, France	W50	Hard (i)	Anastasia Zakharova	6–3, 1–6, 4–6
Win	4–5	Aug 2026	Ladies Open Hechingen, Germany	W75	Clay	(France) Fiona Ferro	5–7, 7–5, 6–4
Loss	4–6	Aug 2026	ITF Koksijde, Belgium	W75	Clay	(Italy) Noemi Basiletti	6–2, 5–7, 5–7
Win	5–6	Aug 2026	ITF Bytom, Poland	W75	Clay	(Czech Republic) Denisa Žoldáková	3–6, 7–5, 6–4

=== Doubles: 1 (runner-up) ===
Legend W100 tournaments (0–1)	Finals by surface Hard (0–1)

Result	Date	Tournament	Tier	Surface	Partner	Opponents	Score
Loss	Oct 2023	GB Pro-Series Shrewsbury, UK	W100	Hard (i)	(Estonia) Elena Malõgina	(United Kingdom) Harriet Dart (Australia) Olivia Gadecki	0–6, 2–6

== Junior finals ==
=== ITF Junior Circuit ===
==== Singles: 6 (1 title, 5 runner-ups) ====
Legend
Grade 1 / B1 (0–2)
Grade 2 (1–1)
Grade 3 (0–0)
Grade 4 (0–1)
Grade 5 (0–1)

Result	W–L	Date	Tournament	Tier	Surface	Opponent	Score
Loss	0–1	Aug 2018	ITF Slovenská Ľupča, Slovakia	Grade 5	Clay	(Slovakia) Michaela Kadlecková	6–4, 1–6, 5–7
Loss	0–2	Dec 2018	ITF Zagreb, Croatia	Grade 4	Hard	(France) Séléna Janicijevic	1–6, 0–6
Loss	0–3	Jun 2019	ITF Plzeň, Czech Republic	Grade 2	Clay	(Russia) Maria Timofeeva	4–6, 2–6
Loss	0–4	Jan 2020	ITF Prague, Czech Republic	Grade 1	Carpet	(Belarus) Kristina Dmitruk	1–6, 6–4, 2–6
Win	1–4	Aug 2021	ITF Gladbeck, Germany	Grade 2	Clay	(Czech Republic) Kristyna Tomajkova	4–6, 6–1, 6–2
Loss	1–5	Sep 2021	ITF Charleroi, Belgium	Grade 1	Clay	(Czech Republic) Brenda Fruhvirtová	6–1, 3–6, 1–6

==== Doubles: 6 (3 titles, 3 runner-ups) ====
Legend
Grade A (0–1)
Grade 1 / B1 (1–0)
Grade 2 (1–2)
Grade 3 (1–0)
Grade 4 (0–0)

Result	W–L	Date	Tournament	Tier	Surface	Partner	Opponents	Score
Win	1–0	Jun 2019	ITF Plzeň, Czech Republic	Grade 2	Clay	(United States) Hibah Shaikh	(Germany) Mara Guth (Austria) Sinja Kraus	6–0, 6–2
Loss	1–1	Feb 2020	ITF Šiauliai, Lithuania	Grade 2	Hard	(Hungary) Natália Szabanin	(United Kingdom) Kylie Bilchev (Belarus) Daria Butsko	6–7^{(5)}, 4–6
Win	2–1	Aug 2021	ITF Prague, Czech Republic	Grade 3	Clay	(United Kingdom) Eva Shaw	(Czech Republic) Kristyna Hranacová (Czech Republic) Katrin Pavková	6–3, 7–6^{(8)}
Loss	2–2	Aug 2021	ITF Gladbeck, Germany	Grade 2	Clay	(United Kingdom) Eva Shaw	(Belgium) Tilwith Di Girolami (Germany) Laura Isabel Pütz	3–6, 3–6
Win	3–2	Oct 2021	ITF Vrsar, Croatia	Grade 1	Clay	(Czech Republic) Brenda Fruhvirtová	(Croatia) Lucija Ćirić Bagarić (Czech Republic) Lucie Havlíčková	3–6, 6–3, [10–7]
Loss	3–3	Oct 2021	ITF Cape Town, South Africa	Grade A	Hard	(Czech Republic) Brenda Fruhvirtová	(Croatia) Petra Marčinko (Denmark) Johanne Svendsen	3–6, 2–6
