= Lia Karatancheva =

Bulgarian tennis player

- Country (sports): Bulgaria
- Residence: Sofia, Bulgaria
- Born: 8 September 2003 (age 23) Sofia
- Turned pro: 2017
- Plays: Right (two-handed backhand)
- Prize money: $155,412

Singles
- Career record: 212–204
- Career titles: 1 ITF
- Highest ranking: No. 263 (28 July 2025)
- Current ranking: No. 386 (28 September 2026)

Doubles
- Career record: 117–114
- Career titles: 8 ITF
- Highest ranking: No. 155 (16 March 2026)
- Current ranking: No. 222 (28 September 2026)

Team competitions
- Fed Cup: 13–7
- Last updated on: 1 October 2026.

Lia Radoslavova Karatancheva (Bulgarian: Лиа Радославова Каратанчева; born 8 September 2003) is a Bulgarian tennis player. She has a career-high singles ranking by the WTA of No. 263, achieved on 28 July 2025. She also has a career-high doubles ranking of world No. 155, achieved on 16 March 2026.

Karatancheva has won one singles title and eight doubles titles on the ITF Women's World Tennis Tour. She participated in the Bulgaria BJK Cup team for the first time in 2023. Playing for Bulgaria, Karatancheva has a win–loss record of 13–7.

== Career ==
In March 2024, Karatancheva reached the doubles final in Santo Domingo, Dominican Republic.

Karatancheva made her WTA Tour main-draw debut at the 2026 Copa Colsanitas defeating Miriana Tona in the last round of qualifying. She lost to Varvara Lepchenko in the first round.

== Personal life ==
She is the daughter of former rower and member of parliament as part of the Bulgarian Business Bloc, Radoslav Karatantchev. Her mother Zhivka Angelova is journalist.

Lia has three sisters, one of whom, Gabriel Karatantcheva, was a professional tennis player from 2014 to 2017. Her older sister, Sesil, and younger sister, Alexa, are also tennis players.

== ITF Circuit finals ==
=== Singles: 3 (1 title, 2 runner-ups) ===
Legend W75 tournaments (0–1) W50 tournaments (1–0) W35 tournaments (0–1)	Finals by surface Clay (1–1) Hard (0–1)

Result	W–L	Date	Tournament	Tier	Surface	Opponent	Score
Loss	0–1	Jul 2024	Open Castilla y León, Spain	W35	Hard	(France) Yasmine Mansouri	2–6, 7–6^{(5)}, 5–7
Loss	0–2	Sep 2024	Ladies Open Vienna, Austria	W75	Clay	(Croatia) Tena Lukas	4–6, 1–6
Win	1–2	May 2025	ITF Indian Harbour Beach, United States	W50	Clay	(Australia) Arina Rodionova	6–2, 6–7^{(6)}, 6–3

=== Doubles: 19 (8 titles, 11 runner-ups) ===
Legend W100 tournaments (0–2) W75 tournaments (1–3) W50 tournaments (3–2) W25/35 tournaments (4–4)	Finals by surface Hard (3–3) Clay (5–8)

Result	W–L	Date	Tournament	Tier	Surface	Partner	Opponents	Score
Win	1–0	Nov 2022	ITF Heraklion, Greece	W25	Clay	(Romania) Oana Gavrilă	(North Macedonia) Lina Gjorcheska (Bosnia and Herzegovina) Dea Herdzelas	6–4, 6–4
Loss	1–1	Jan 2024	ITF Naples, United States	W35	Clay	(Netherlands) Isabelle Haverlag	(United States) Elvina Kalieva; Maria Kozyreva	0–6, 0–6
Loss	1–2	Mar 2024	ITF Santo Domingo, Dominican Republic	W35	Hard	(United States) Rasheeda McAdoo	(United States) Carmen Corley (United States) Ivana Corley	1–6, 7–6^{(5)}, [10–12]
Win	2–2	Apr 2024	ITF Santa Margherita di Pula, Italy	W35	Clay	(Greece) Eleni Christofi	(Italy) Eleonora Alvisi (Italy) Federica Urgesi	6–0, 6–4
Loss	2–3	May 2024	ITF Kuršumlijska Banja, Serbia	W35	Clay	(Czech Republic) Michaela Bayerlová	Ksenia Laskutova (Slovakia) Radka Zelníčková	7–5, 6–7^{(3)}, [9–11]
Loss	2–4	Jun 2024	Open Araba en Femenino, Spain	W100	Hard	(Latvia) Diāna Marcinkēviča	(France) Estelle Cascino (Philippines) Alex Eala	3–6, 6–2, [4–10]
Win	3–4	Jul 2024	Open Castilla y León, Spain	W35	Hard	(Slovakia) Radka Zelníčková	(Australia) Alexandra Osborne (United States) Anna Rogers	2–6, 6–3, [10–3]
Loss	3–5	Aug 2024	Zagreb Open, Croatia	W50	Clay	(Greece) Sapfo Sakellaridi	(Slovenia) Živa Falkner (Hungary) Amarissa Tóth	4–6, 3–6
Loss	3–6	Sep 2024	Pazardzhik Cup, Bulgaria	W75	Clay	(Greece) Sapfo Sakellaridi	(Slovenia) Veronika Erjavec (Bosnia and Herzegovina) Anita Wagner	5–7, 6–3, [5–10]
Loss	3–7	Sep 2024	ITF Kuršumlijska Banja, Serbia	W75	Clay	(Romania) Cristina Dinu	Amina Anshba (Germany) Noma Noha Akugue	2–6, 6–7^{(2)}
Loss	3–8	Oct 2024	ITF Faro, Portugal	W35	Hard	(Latvia) Diāna Marcinkēviča	(Poland) Weronika Falkowska (Netherlands) Stéphanie Visscher	4–6, 6–2, [5–10]
Win	4–8	Mar 2025	ITF Antalya, Turkiye	W35	Clay	(United States) Makenna Jones	(Romania) Ilinca Amariei (Romania) Cristina Dinu	6–2, 6–2
Win	5–8	Apr 2025	ITF Calvi, France	W75	Hard	(Sweden) Lisa Zaar	(India) Riya Bhatia (Burundi) Sada Nahimana	6–4, 6–3
Loss	5–9	Jun 2025	Macha Lake Open, Czech Republic	W75	Clay	(Czech Republic) Aneta Kučmová	(Czech Republic) Alena Kovačková (Czech Republic) Ivana Šebestová	6–1, 5–7, [5–10]
Win	6–9	Sep 2025	Pazardzhik Cup, Bulgaria	W50+H	Clay	(Greece) Sapfo Sakellaridi	(France) Yara Bartashevich; Alevtina Ibragimova	6–2, 7–5
Win	7–9	Sep 2025	Pazardzhik Cup 2, Bulgaria	W50+H	Clay	(Greece) Sapfo Sakellaridi	(Romania) Elena Ruxandra Bertea; Daria Lodikova	6–7^{(5)}, 6–4, [10–5]
Win	8–9	Feb 2026	ITF Orlando, United States	W50	Hard	(Ukraine) Anita Sahdiieva	(Brazil) Thaísa Grana Pedretti (Bolivia) Noelia Zeballos	6–3, 6–4
Loss	8–10	May 2026	Bonita Springs Championship, US	W100	Clay	(United States) Anna Rogers	(Ecuador) Mell Reasco (Czech Republic) Darja Vidmanova	5–7, 3–6
Loss	8–11	Aug 2026	ITF Kuršumlijska Banja, Serbia	W50	Clay	(India) Prarthana Thombare	(Bulgaria) Rositsa Dencheva; Maria Golovina	4–6, 7–6^{(0)}, [7–10]

== National representation ==
=== Billie Jean King Cup ===
Karatancheva debuted in Bulgaria Billie Jean King Cup team in 2023; since then she has accumulated a win–loss record of 8–3 in singles and 5–5 in doubles (13–8 overall).

==== Singles (8–3) ====
Edition	Round	Date	Location	Against	Surface	Opponent	W/L	Result
2023	Z1 RR	11 Apr 2023	Antalya (TUR)	Croatia	Clay	Petra Marčinko	W	4–6, 6–3, 6–3
2023	Z1 RR	12 Apr 2023	Antalya (TUR)	Sweden	Clay	Kajsa Rinaldo Persson	W	7–6^{(13–11)}, 7–6^{(7–4)}
2023	Z1 RR	13 Apr 2023	Antalya (TUR)	Norway	Clay	Ulrikke Eikeri	W	3–6, 6–4, 6–4
2023	Z1 RR	14 Apr 2023	Antalya (TUR)	Denmark	Clay	Rebecca Munk Mortensen	W	6–0, 6–0
2024	Z1 RR	9 Apr 2024	Antalya (TUR)	Denmark	Clay	Johanne Svendsen	L	2–6, 2–6
2024	Z1 RR	10 Apr 2024	Antalya (TUR)	Austria	Clay	Tamira Paszek	L	5–7, 2–6
2024	Z1 PO	13 Apr 2024	Antalya (TUR)	Portugal	Clay	Angelina Voloshchuk	W	6–1, 6–3
2025	Z2 RR	8 Apr 2025	Larnaca (CYP)	Israel	Hard	Lina Glushko	W	1–6, 6–3, 7–6^{(7–3)}
2025	Z2 RR	9 Apr 2025	Larnaca (CYP)	Egypt	Hard	Sandra Samir	W	6–4, 6–3
2025	Z2 PO	10 Apr 2025	Larnaca (CYP)	Norway	Hard	Malene Helgø	W	6–4, 6–2
2025	Z2 PO	11 Apr 2025	Larnaca (CYP)	Georgia	Hard	Mariam Bolkvadze	L	7–5, 6–7^{(7–9)}, 2–6

==== Doubles (5–5) ====
Edition	Round	Date	Location	Partner	Surface	Against	Opponents	W/L	Result
2023	Z1 RR	10 Apr 2023	Antalya (TUR)	Gergana Topalova	Clay	Serbia	Katarina Kozarov; Lola Radivojević	W	2–6, 6–3, 6–2
2023	Z1 RR	13 Apr 2023	Antalya (TUR)	Gergana Topalova	Clay	Norway	Ulrikke Eikeri; Malene Helgø	L	6–2, 1–6, 4–6
2023	Z1 RR	14 Apr 2023	Antalya (TUR)	Gergana Topalova	Clay	Denmark	Rebecca Munk Mortensen; Johanne Svendsen	W	6–3, 3–6, 6–1
2024	Z1 RR	8 Apr 2024	Oeiras (POR)	Isabella Shinikova	Clay	Hungary	Adrienn Nagy; Natália Szabanin	L	4–6, 3–6
2024	Z1 RR	9 Apr 2024	Oeiras (POR)	Isabella Shinikova	Clay	Denmark	Laura Brunkel; Rebecca Munk Mortensen	W	6–4, 6–4
2024	Z1 RR	10 Apr 2024	Oeiras (POR)	Gergana Topalova	Clay	Austria	Melanie Klaffner; Tamira Paszek	W	6–7^{(5–7)}, 6–1, [10–6]
2024	Z1 PO	12 Apr 2024	Oeiras (POR)	Gergana Topalova	Clay	Norway	Emily Sartz-Lunde; Carina Syrtveit	W	7–6^{(7–3)}, 7–5
2024	Z1 PO	13 Apr 2024	Oeiras (POR)	Isabella Shinikova	Clay	Portugal	Francisca Jorge; Matilde Jorge	L	3–6, 6–4, [2–10]
2025	Z2 RR	9 Apr 2025	Larnaca (CYP)	Isabella Shinikova	Hard	Egypt	Gana Hossam Salah; Amira Mohamed Badwy	L	1–1, ret.
2025	Z2 PO	10 Apr 2025	Larnaca (CYP)	Isabella Shinikova	Hard	Norway	Malene Helgø; Ulrikke Eikeri	L	5–7, 5–7
