= Petra Marčinko =

Croatian tennis player (born 2005)

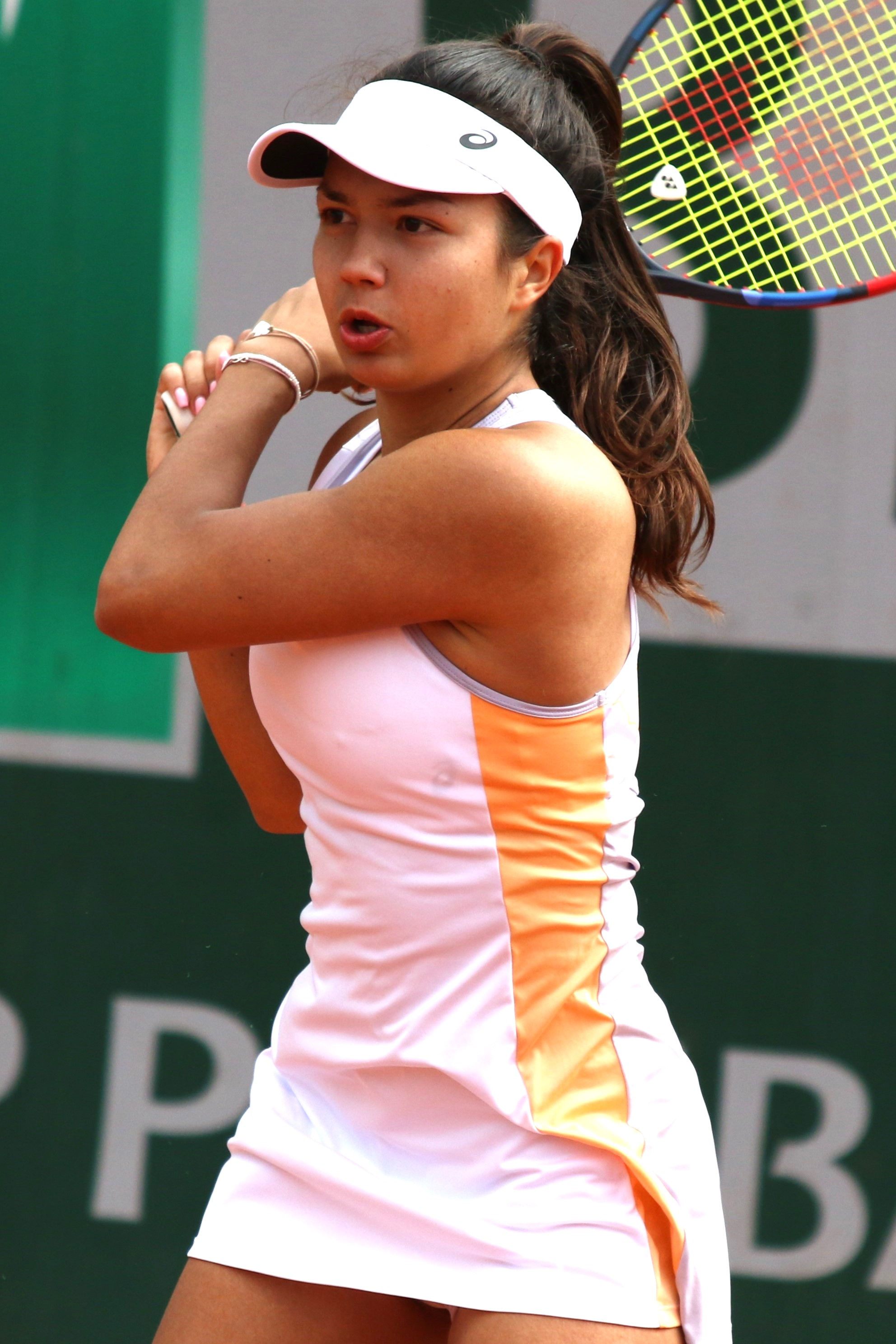
- Marčinko at the 2023 French Open
- Country (sports): Croatia
- Residence: Split, Croatia
- Born: 4 December 2005 (age 20) Zagreb, Croatia
- Height: 1.76 m (5 ft 9 in)
- Turned pro: 2021
- Plays: Right (two-handed backhand)
- Coach: Marino Jakić
- Prize money: $1,269,907

Singles
- Career record: 173–99
- Career titles: 1
- Highest ranking: No. 45 (13 July 2026)
- Current ranking: No. 78 (12 October 2026)

Grand Slam singles results
- Australian Open: 2R (2026)
- French Open: 1R (2026)
- Wimbledon: 1R (2026)
- US Open: 1R (2026)

Doubles
- Career record: 30–20
- Career titles: 4 ITF
- Highest ranking: No. 372 (20 July 2026)
- Current ranking: No. 489 (28 September 2026)

Grand Slam doubles results
- French Open: 1R (2026)
- Wimbledon: 1R (2026)
- US Open: 1R (2026)

Team competitions
- Fed Cup: 18–7 (singles 14–4)
- Last updated on: 12 October 2026.

Petra Marčinko (born 4 December 2005) is a Croatian tennis player. Marčinko has a career-high WTA singles ranking of No. 45, achieved on 13 July 2026, and a best doubles ranking of No. 372, reached in July 2026.

Marčinko has won one WTA Tour singles title at the 2026 Morocco Open and one WTA 125 singles title at the 2025 ATV Tennis Open in Rome, Italy.

She achieved the No. 1 junior ranking on 13 December 2021.

== Career overview ==
=== 2021–2022: Junior No. 1 & professional debut ===
On the ITF Junior Circuit, Marčinko had won nine singles and seven doubles titles. In December 2021, she completed a remarkable late-season surge as singles and doubles wins at the Orange Bowl championship saw her climb nine places to finish as the year-end junior world No. 1 on 13 December 2021.

At the beginning of 2022, she won her first junior Grand Slam title at the Australian Open, defeating Sofia Costoulas in the final, in straight sets.

As a 16-year-old, Marčinko made her WTA Tour debut at the 2022 Morocco Open in Rabat as a wildcard player defeating Rebecca Peterson, before losing to Astra Sharma in the second round.

=== 2023–2025: First WTA 125 title ===
She won her sixth consecutive ITF Women's Circuit title at the 2023 Caldas da Rainha Ladies Open, defeating Léolia Jeanjean in the final in straight sets, and set the new Croatian record for the youngest women's player to win six professional singles titles before turning 18.

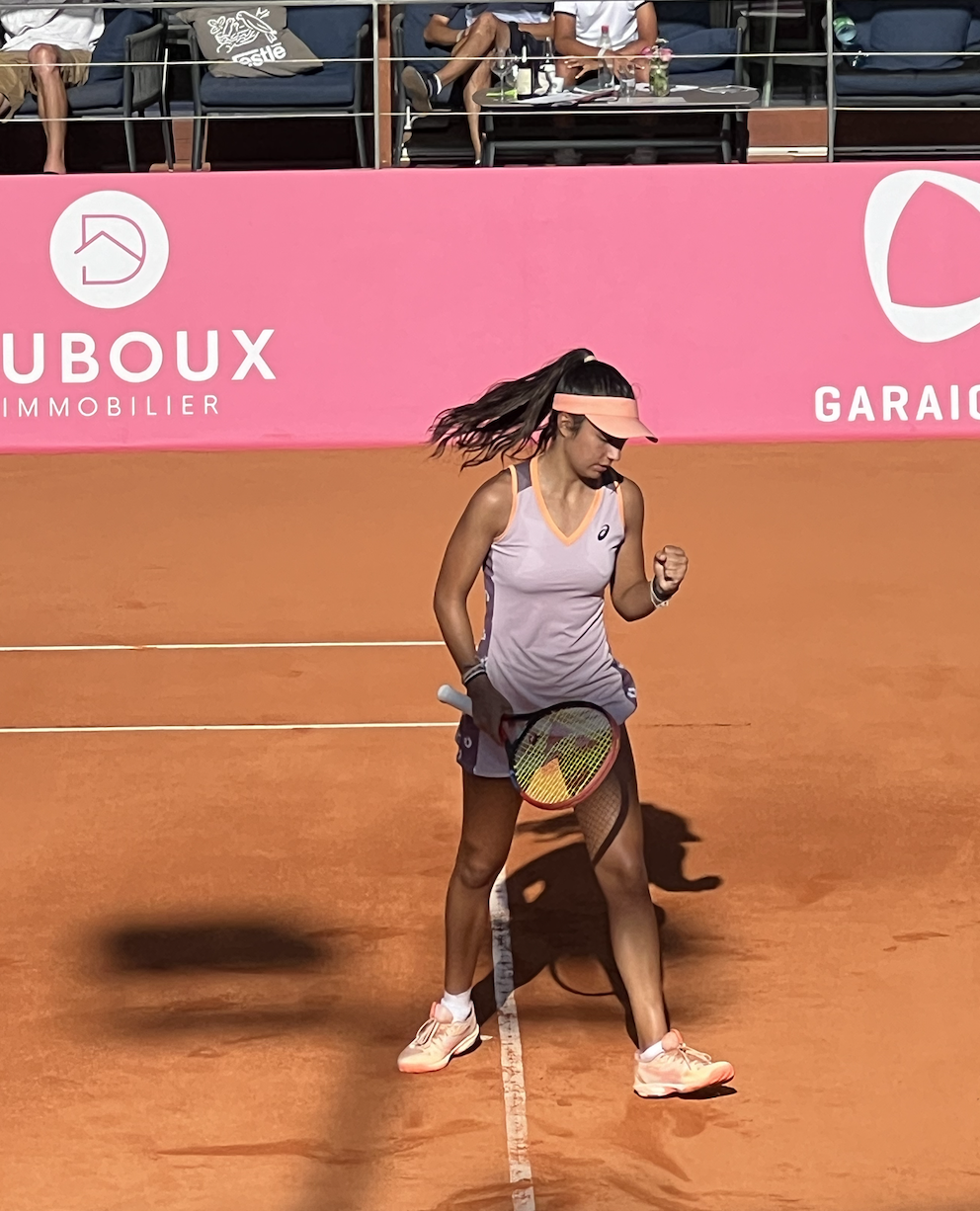
Marčinko at the 2024 Montreux Ladies Open

Having been given a wildcard entry, Marčinko finished runner-up at the 2024 WTA 125 Montreux Ladies Open, losing to seventh seed Irina-Camelia Begu in the final, in three sets.

In July 2025, she won her first WTA 125 title at the ATV Tennis Open in Rome, defeating Oksana Selekhmeteva in the final.

=== 2026: Major & top 50 debuts, WTA Tour title ===
Marčinko made her major debut at the Australian Open where she directly entered the main-draw and recorded her first win over Tatjana Maria, before losing to Peyton Stearns in the second round.

Seeded sixth, Marčinko won her maiden tour title at the Rabat Grand Prix, defeating qualifier Vera Zvonareva, wildcard entrant Yelyzaveta Kotliar, second seed Jéssica Bouzas Maneiro and Jil Teichmann en route to the final, which she won when her opponent, Anhelina Kalinina, retired due to injury in the second set. As a result of claiming the trophy, Marčinko reached a new career-high ranking of world No. 51 on 25 May 2026 and the top 50 on 8 June 2026.

Entering the main draw as a lucky loser at the Eastbourne Open, she recorded wins over fellow Croatian Antonia Ružić, qualifier Kimberly Birrell and Caty McNally to reach her first WTA Tour grass-court semifinal. Marčinko retired due to injury, after losing the first set of her last-four match against second seed Madison Keys.

Seeded second at the Iași Open, Marčinko won against wildcard entrant Nadia Podoroska and qualifier Elina Avanesyan, before losing to Tamara Zidanšek in the quarterfinals.

== Performance timeline ==
Key
W	F	SF	QF	#R	RR	Q#	P#	DNQ	A	Z#	PO	G	S	B	NMS	NTI	P	NH

(W) winner; (F) finalist; (SF) semifinalist; (QF) quarterfinalist; (#R) rounds 4, 3, 2, 1; (RR) round-robin stage; (Q#) qualification round; (P#) preliminary round; (DNQ) did not qualify; (A) absent; (Z#) Davis/Fed Cup Zonal Group (with number indication) or (PO) play-off; (G) gold, (S) silver or (B) bronze Olympic/Paralympic medal; (NMS) not a Masters tournament; (NTI) not a Tier I tournament; (P) postponed; (NH) not held; (SR) strike rate (events won / competed); (W–L) win–loss record.
To avoid confusion and double counting, these charts are updated at the conclusion of a tournament or when the player's participation has ended.

=== Singles ===
Tournament	2023	2024	2025	2026	W–L
Grand Slam tournaments
Australian Open	Q2	Q1	A	2R	1–1
French Open	Q2	Q2	Q2	1R	0–1
Wimbledon	A	Q1	Q1	1R	0–1
US Open	Q2	A	Q2	1R	0–1
Win–Loss	0–0	0–0	0–0	1–4	1–4
WTA 1000 tournaments
Qatar Open	NTI	A	A	A	0–0
Dubai Championships	A	A	A	1R	0–1
Indian Wells Open	Q1	A	A	1R	0–1
Miami Open	A	A	A	1R	0–1
Madrid Open	A	A	A	2R	1–1
Italian Open	A	A	A	1R	0–1
Cincinnati Open	A	A	A	1R	0–1
Win–Loss	0–0	0–0	0–0	1–6	1–6

== WTA Tour finals ==
=== Singles: 1 (title) ===
Legend WTA 250 (1–0)	Finals by surface Clay (1–0)

Result	Date	Tournament	Tier	Surface	Opponent	Score
Win	May 2026	Rabat Grand Prix, Morocco	WTA 250	Clay	(Ukraine) Anhelina Kalinina	6–2, 3–0 ret.

== WTA 125 finals ==
=== Singles: 2 (1 title, 1 runner-up) ===
Result	W–L	Date	Tournament	Surface	Opponent	Score
Loss	0–1	Sep 2024	Montreux Ladies Open, Switzerland	Clay	(Romania) Irina-Camelia Begu	6–1, 3–6, 0–6
Win	1–1	Jul 2025	ATV Rome Open, Italy	Clay	Oksana Selekhmeteva	6–3, 4–6, 6–3

== ITF Circuit finals ==
=== Singles: 12 (11 titles, 1 runner-up) ===
Legend
W100 tournaments (3–0)
W80 tournaments (1–0)
W60/75 tournaments (4–1)
W25 tournaments (3–0)

Result	W–L	Date	Tournament	Tier	Surface	Opponent	Score
Win	1–0	Mar 2022	ITF Antalya, Turkey	W25	Clay	(France) Carole Monnet	6–4, 6–1
Win	2–0	Mar 2022	ITF Antalya, Turkey	W25	Clay	(Italy) Elisabetta Cocciaretto	1–6, 6–4, 6–4
Win	3–0	Oct 2022	Internationaux de Poitiers, France	W80	Hard (i)	(Belgium) Ysaline Bonaventure	6–3, 7–6^{(2)}
Win	4–0	Jun 2023	Roma Cup, Italy	W60	Clay	(Italy) Giorgia Pedone	6–2, 6–2
Win	5–0	Jun 2023	ITF Tarvisio, Italy	W25	Clay	(Poland) Katarzyna Kawa	6–1, 4–6, 6–2
Win	6–0	Sep 2023	Caldas da Rainha Open, Portugal	W60	Hard	(France) Léolia Jeanjean	6–4, 6–1
Win	7–0	Oct 2024	Challenger de Saguenay, Canada	W75+H	Hard (i)	(Netherlands) Anouk Koevermans	6–3, 4–6, 7–6^{(3)}
Win	8–0	Aug 2025	Landisville Tennis Challenge, United States	W100	Hard	(Indonesia) Janice Tjen	7–6^{(4)}, 3–6, 6–4
Loss	8–1	Sep 2025	Le Neubourg Open, France	W75	Hard	(Belgium) Greet Minnen	2–6, 1–6
Win	9–1	Oct 2025	Tyler Pro Challenge, United States	W100	Hard	(United States) Mary Stoiana	6–3, 6–0
Win	10–1	Nov 2025	Fujairah Open, UAE	W75	Hard	Alevtina Ibragimova	6–4, 6–4
Win	11–1	Dec 2025	Dubai Tennis Challenge, UAE	W100	Hard	Vera Zvonareva	6–3, 6–3

=== Doubles: 5 (4 titles, 1 runner-up) ===
Legend
W75 tournaments (2–0)
W15 tournaments (2–1)

Result	W–L	Date	Tournament	Tier	Surface	Partner	Opponents	Score
Win	1–0	May 2021	ITF Šibenik, Croatia	W15	Clay	(Hungary) Natália Szabanin	(Russia) Darya Astakhova (Russia) Ekaterina Makarova	6–4, 6–3
Win	2–0	May 2021	ITF Šibenik, Croatia	W15	Clay	(Hungary) Natália Szabanin	(Bosnia and Herzegovina) Nefisa Berberović (Italy) Nicole Fossa Huergo	6–4, 3–6, [10–4]
Loss	2–1	Oct 2021	ITF Monastir, Tunisia	W15	Clay	(Switzerland) Sebastianna Scilipoti	(China) Ma Yexin (China) Zhuoma Ni Ma	6–3, 4–6, [7–10]
Win	3–1	Aug 2024	ITF Kuršumlijska Banja, Serbia	W75	Clay	(Serbia) Lola Radivojević	(Slovenia) Živa Falkner (Croatia) Tara Würth	7–6^{(5)}, 6–4
Win	4–1	Mar 2025	ITF Murska Sobota, Slovenia	W75	Hard (i)	(Croatia) Tara Würth	(Chinese Taipei) Cho I-hsuan (Chinese Taipei) Cho Yi-tsen	6–3, 3–6, [10–4]

== Junior finals ==
=== Grand Slam tournaments ===
==== Singles: 1 (title) ====
Result	Year	Tournament	Surface	Opponent	Score
Win	2022	Australian Open	Hard	(Belgium) Sofia Costoulas	7–5, 6–1

== Fed Cup participation ==
=== Singles (12–3) ===
Edition	Stage	Date	Location	Against	Surface	Opponent	W/L	Score
2022	Z1 R/R	11 Apr 2022	Antalya, Turkey	Sweden	Clay	Jacqueline Cabaj Awad	W	6–0, 6–4
2022	Z1 R/R	12 Apr 2022	Antalya, Turkey	Bulgaria	Clay	Julia Terziyska	W	6–4, 6–4
2022	Z1 R/R	14 Apr 2022	Antalya, Turkey	(Georgia (country)) Georgia	Clay	Nino Natsvlishvili	W	6–2, 6–2
2022	Z1 P/O	16 Apr 2022	Antalya, Turkey	Serbia	Clay	Lola Radivojević	W	6–1, 2–6, 6–0
2022	P/O	11 Nov 2022	Rijeka, Croatia	Germany	Hard (i)	Jule Niemeier	W	6–3, 6–2
2022	P/O	12 Nov 2022	Rijeka, Croatia	Germany	Hard (i)	Anna-Lena Friedsam	L	4–6, 1–6
2023	Z1 R/R	10 Apr 2023	Antalya, Turkey	Denmark	Clay	Johanne Svendsen	W	2–6, 7–5, 7–5
2023	Z1 R/R	11 Apr 2023	Antalya, Turkey	Bulgaria	Clay	Lia Karatancheva	L	6–4, 3–6, 3–6
2023	Z1 R/R	13 Apr 2023	Antalya, Turkey	Sweden	Clay	Caijsa Hennemann	L	4–6, 5–7
2025	Z1 R/R	8 April 2025	Vilnius, Lithuania	Austria	Hard (i)	Tamara Kostic	W	6–1, 6–1
2025	Z1 R/R	9 April 2025	Vilnius, Lithuania	Portugal	Hard (i)	Matilde Jorge	W	6–1, 3–6, 7–5
2025	Z1 R/R	10 April 2025	Vilnius, Lithuania	Latvia	Hard (i)	Beatrise Zeltiņa	W	6–3, 6–1
2025	Z1 P/O	12 April 2025	Vilnius, Lithuania	Serbia	Hard (i)	Teodora Kostović	W	6–3, 6–3
2025	P/O	15 November 2025	Varaždin, Croatia	Colombia	Hard (i)	Yuliana Lizarazo	W	6–3, 6–0
2025	P/O	16 November 2025	Varaždin, Croatia	Czech Republic	Hard (i)	Nikola Bartůňková	W	6–3, 7–6^{(6)}

=== Doubles (4–3) ===
Edition	Stage	Date	Location	Against	Surface	Partner	Opponent	W/L	Score
2022	Z1 R/R	15 Apr 2022	Antalya, Turkey	Austria	Clay	Tara Würth	Barbara Haas; Melanie Klaffner	L	7–5, ret.
2023	Z1 R/R	10 Apr 2023	Antalya, Turkey	Denmark	Clay	Tara Würth	Rebecca Mortensen; Johanne Svendsen	L	3–6, 5–7
2023	Z1 R/R	14 Apr 2023	Antalya, Turkey	Norway	Clay	Lucija Ćirić Bagarić	Emilie Elde; Lilly Elida Håseth	W	6–2, 6–1
2025	Z1 R/R	8 April 2025	Vilnius, Lithuania	Austria	Hard (i)	Tara Würth	Ekaterina Perelygina; Julia Grabher	W	6–3, 4–6, [10–7]
2025	Z1 P/O	12 April 2025	Vilnius, Lithuania	Serbia	Hard (i)	Tara Würth	Teodora Kostović; Natalija Senić	W	6–1, 6–2
2025	P/O	15 November 2025	Varaždin, Croatia	Colombia	Hard (i)	Jana Fett	Yuliana Lizarazo; Camila Osorio	W	6–4, 6–3
2025	P/O	16 November 2025	Varaždin, Croatia	Czech Republic	Hard (i)	Jana Fett	Lucie Havlíčková; Linda Nosková	L	2–6, 6–3, 3–6

=== United Cup (0–2) ===
Group membership United Cup (0–2)	Matches by surface Hard (0–2)	Matches by type Doubles (0–2)	Matches by setting Outdoors (0–2)

Outcome	No.	Surface	Match type (partner)	Opponent nation	Opponent player(s)	Score
2023
29 December–8 January; RAC Arena, Perth, Australia; Group stage
Loss	1.	Hard	Mixed doubles (with Matija Pecotić)	France	(France) Jessika Ponchet / (France) Édouard Roger-Vasselin	4–6, 4–6
2025
27 December–5 January; RAC Arena, Perth, Australia; Group stage
Loss	1.	Hard	Mixed doubles (with Ivan Dodig)	United States	(United States) Coco Gauff / (United States) Taylor Fritz	2–6, 3–6

Sporting positions
Preceded by (United States) Ashlyn Krueger	Orange Bowl Girls' Singles Champion; Category: 18 and under 2021	Succeeded by (Japan) Mayu Crossley
Preceded by (United States) Reese Brantmeier / (United States) Kimmi Hance	Orange Bowl Girls' Doubles Champion; 2021; With: (Russia) Diana Shnaider	Succeeded by (United States) Tyra Grant / (United States) Iva Jovic
