= Natalija Senić =

Serbian tennis player (born 2003)

- Country (sports): Serbia
- Born: January 2, 2003 (age 23) Kragujevac, Serbia
- Plays: Righ (two-handed backhand)
- Prize money: $85,798

Singles
- Career record: 211–86
- Highest ranking: No. 338 (December 01, 2025)
- Current ranking: No. 354 (August 03, 2026)

Doubles
- Career record: 81–40
- Highest ranking: No. 277 (June 29, 2026)
- Current ranking: No. 288 (August 03, 2026)
- Last updated on: August 03, 2026.

Natalija Senić (born January 2, 2003) is a Serbian tennis player.

She has a career-high singles ranking by the WTA of No. 338, achieved on 01 December 2025. She has a career-high doubles ranking of No. 277, achieved on 29 June 2026.

== Early life ==
Born in Kragujevac Senić, started playing tennis at the age of five at Tennis Club Radnički in Kragujevac.

== Career ==
In June 2023, she and Greek Eleni Christofi has won the ITF W15 women's doubles Final at the World Tennis Tour in Kuršumlijska Banja. Defeating Brazil Ana Candioto, and Peruvian Anastasia Iamachkine. She won the first doubles title of her career.

In December 2023, She won the title at the ITF W15 event held in Antalya after her Moroccan opponent, Aya El Aouni, retired from the singles final due to injury.

Senić has been nominated for the Billie Jean King Cup for the first time to represent Serbia in 2024.

In August 2025, alongside her compatriot Anja Stanković, she won the women's doubles final at the ITF W75 Serbian Tennis Tour part of the World Tennis Tour held in Kuršumlijska Banja; in the final, they defeated the Portuguese sisters Francisca Jorge and Matilde Jorge in straight sets. She secured the first major championship of her career.

In September 2025, she won singles ITF W15 event in Kuršumlijska Banja.

In October 2025 ,She won the singles and doubles titles at the ITF W35 tournament in Heraklion, Greece.

== ITF Circuit finals ==
=== Singles: 17 (9 titles, 8 runner-ups) ===
Legend W35 tournaments W15 tournaments	Finals by surface Clay (9–8)

Result	W–L	Date	Tournament	Tier	Surface	Opponent	Score
Loss	0–1	Jul 2021	ITF Prokuplje, Serbia	W15	Clay	(Latvia) Darja Semeņistaja	0–6, 2–6
Loss	0–2	Mar 2023	ITF Antalya, Turkiye	W15	Clay	(Bulgaria) Denislava Glushkova	2–6, 4–6
Win	1–2	Aug 2023	ITF Kuršumlijska Banja, Serbia	W15	Clay	(Serbia) Anja Stanković	6–2, 4–6, 6–2
Loss	1–3	Nov 2023	ITF Antalya, Turkey	W15	Clay	(Sweden) Lisa Zaar	2–6, 1–6
Win	2–3	Dec 2023	ITF Antalya, Turkey	W15	Clay	(Morocco) Aya El Aouni	5–1 ret.
Loss	2–4	Jun 2024	ITF Kuršumlijska Banja, Serbia	W15	Clay	Alexandra Shubladze	2–6, 0–1 ret.
Win	3–4	Jun 2024	ITF Kuršumlijska Banja, Serbia	W15	Clay	(Serbia) Anja Stanković	6–3, 6–2
Loss	3–5	Jul 2024	ITF Kuršumlijska Banja, Serbia	W15	Clay	(Latvia) Kamilla Bartone	3–6, 4–6
Win	4–5	Aug 2024	ITF Kuršumlijska Banja, Serbia	W15	Clay	(Serbia) Anja Stanković	7–5, 6–2
Win	5–5	Sep 2024	ITF Kuršumlijska Banja, Serbia	W15	Clay	(Hungary) Luca Udvardy	6–4, 6–2
Loss	5–6	Dec 2024	ITF Antalya, Turkiye	W15	Clay	(Bulgaria) Denislava Glushkova	4–6, 0–6
Loss	5–7	Dec 2024	ITF Antalya, Turkey	W15	Clay	Alisa Oktiabreva	2–6, 0–1 ret.
Win	6–7	Apr 2025	ITF Kuršumlijska Banja, Serbia	W15	Clay	(Serbia) Anja Stanković	6–1, 6–1
Loss	6–8	Sep 2025	ITF Kuršumlijska Banja, Serbia	W15	Clay	(Serbia) Draginja Vuković	2–6, 3–6
Win	7–8	Sep 2025	ITF Kuršumlijska Banja, Serbia	W15	Clay	(Romania) Giulia Safina Popa	6–1, 6–1
Win	8–8	Oct 2025	ITF Heraklion, Greece	W35	Clay	Daria Lodikova	6–3, 6–2
Win	9–8	Nov 2025	ITF Heraklion, Greece	W35	Clay	(Czech Republic) Eliška Ticháčková	1–6, 7–5, 6–3

=== Doubles: 17 (12 titles, 5 runner–ups) ===
Legend
W75 tournaments
W35 tournaments
W15 tournaments

Result	W–L	Date	Tournament	Tier	Surface	Partner	Opponents	Score
Win	1–0	Jun 2023	ITF Kuršumlijska Banja, Serbia	W15	Clay	(Greece) Eleni Christofi	(Brazil) Ana Candiotto (Peru) Anastasia Iamachkine	7–6^{(5)}, 6–3
Win	2–0	Aug 2023	ITF Kuršumlijska Banja, Serbia	W15	Clay	(Serbia) Anja Stanković	(Bulgaria) Gebriela Mihaylova (Bulgaria) Yoana Radulova	6–2, 6–2
Loss	2–1	Feb 2024	ITF Antalya, Turkey	W15	Clay	(Italy) Alessandra Mazzola	(Serbia) Anja Stanković (Turkey) İlay Yörük	3–6, 6–3, [4–10]
Loss	2–2	May 2024	ITF Kuršumlijska Banja, Serbia	W15	Clay	(Germany) Tea Lukic	(Switzerland) Jenny Dürst (Poland) Daria Kuczer	3–6, 1–6
Win	3–2	May 2024	ITF Kuršumlijska Banja, Serbia	W15	Clay	(Serbia) Nina Stojanović	(Poland) Daria Kuczer (Belgium) Vicky Van de Peer	7–5, 7–5
Win	4–2	Jun 2024	ITF Kuršumlijska Banja, Serbia	W15	Clay	(Serbia) Anja Stanković	Ksenia Laskutova; Alexandra Shubladze	7–6^{(5)}, 7–6^{(4)}
Win	5–2	Aug 2024	Vrnjačka Banja Open, Serbia	W35	Clay	(Serbia) Anja Stanković	(Slovenia) Ela Nala Milić (Italy) Anna Turati	6–3, 6–4
Win	6–2	Aug 2025	Serbian Tennis Tour, Serbia	W75	Clay	(Serbia) Anja Stanković	(Portugal) Francisca Jorge (Portugal) Matilde Jorge	6–2, 7–5
Win	7–2	Sep 2025	ITF Kuršumlijska Banja, Serbia	W15	Clay	(Serbia) Andrea Obradović	(Bulgaria) Alexa Karatancheva (Bulgaria) Darya Velikova	6–3, 6–1
Win	8–2	Oct 2025	ITF Heraklion, Greece	W35	Clay	(Netherlands) Antonia Stoyanov	(Greece) Elena Korokozidi (Greece) Martha Matoula	6–4, 6–2
Loss	8–3	Apr 2026	ITF Santa Margherita di Pula, Italy	W35	Clay	(France) Séléna Janicijevic	(Italy) Deborah Chiesa (Italy) Giorgia Pedone	6–7^{(8)}, 3–6
Win	9–3	May 2026	ITF Belgrade, Serbia	W15	Clay	(Serbia) Anja Stanković	(Slovenia) Alja Senica (Romania) Briana Szabó	6–2, 7–5
Win	10–3	Jun 2026	ITF Kuršumlijska Banja, Serbia	W15	Clay	(Serbia) Elena Milovanović	(Romania) Alexandra Irina Anghel; Mariia Masiianskaia	6–2, 6–4
Win	11–3	Jun 2026	ITF Kuršumlijska Banja, Serbia	W15	Clay	(Serbia) Anja Stanković	(Romania) Patricia Georgiana Goina (Czech Republic) Amelie Justine Hejtmanek	w/o
Win	12–3	Jul 2026	ITF Kuršumlijska Banja, Serbia	W15	Clay	(Serbia) Anja Stanković	(Romania) Marianna Argyrokastriti (Czech Republic) Lucie Urbanová	6–3, 6–3
Loss	12–4	Aug 2026	Serbian Tennis Tour, Serbia	W35	Clay	Maria Golovina	Alina Yuneva; Ksenia Zaytseva	0–6, 4–6
Loss	12–5	Oct 2026	ITF Santa Margherita di Pula, Italy	W35	Clay	(France) Nina Radovanovic	(Italy) Giorgia Pedone (Sweden) Lisa Zaar	6–7^{(6)}, 7–6^{(3)}, [4–10]
