= Živa Falkner =

Slovenian tennis player (born 2002)

- Country (sports): Slovenia
- Born: 7 July 2002 (age 24)
- Plays: Right (two-handed backhand)
- Prize money: $89,170

Singles
- Career record: 193–157
- Career titles: 2 ITF
- Highest ranking: No. 397 (11 September 2023)
- Current ranking: No. 1025 (3 August 2026)

Doubles
- Career record: 96–77
- Career titles: 5 ITF
- Highest ranking: No. 213 (30 June 2025)
- Current ranking: No. 901 (3 August 2026)
- Last updated on: 6 August 2026.

Živa Falkner (born 7 July 2002) is a Slovenian tennis player.

Falkner has career-high WTA rankings of 397 in singles and 213 in doubles.

Partnering Matilda Mutavdzic, she was runner-up in the girls' doubles at the 2021 Portorož Open, losing to Alex Eala and Priska Madelyn Nugroho in the final.

Falkner made her WTA Tour main-draw debut at the 2021 Slovenia Open, after receiving a wildcard, losing in the first round to Aleksandra Krunić.

== ITF Circuit finals ==
=== Singles: 8 (2 titles, 6 runner-ups) ===
Legend W60 tournaments W15 tournaments	Finals by surface Hard (0–1) Clay (2–5)

Result	W–L	Date	Tournament	Tier	Surface	Opponent	Score
Win	1–0	Sep 2020	ITF Otočec, Slovenia	W15	Clay	(Slovenia) Tina Cvetkovič	6–0, 7–6^{(6)}
Loss	1–1	Jul 2021	ITF Antalya, Turkey	W15	Clay	(Romania) Ilona Georgiana Ghioroaie	4–6, 3–6
Loss	1–2	Aug 2021	ITF Bad Waltersdorf, Austria	W15	Clay	(Croatia) Antonia Ružić	2–6, 2–6
Loss	1–3	Nov 2021	ITF Lousada, Portugal	W15	Hard (i)	(South Korea) Ku Yeon-woo	0–6, 5–7
Loss	1–4	May 2023	ITF Kuršumlijska Banja, Serbia	W15	Clay	(China) Wang Meiling	2–6, 6–7^{(6)}
Loss	1–5	Jul 2023	Ladies Open Hechingen, Germany	W60	Clay	(Czech Republic) Brenda Fruhvirtová	3–6, 1–6
Win	2–5	Jun 2024	ITF Banja Luka, Bosnia and Herzegovina	W15	Clay	(Serbia) Luna Vujović	6–4, 6–4
Loss	2–6	Jun 2026	ITF Osijek, Croatia	W15	Clay	(Switzerland) Katerina Tsygourova	5–7, 3–6

=== Doubles: 12 (5 titles, 7 runner-ups) ===
Legend W75 tournaments W50 tournaments W25/35 tournaments W15 tournaments	Finals by surface Hard (1–1) Clay (4–6)

Result	W–L	Date	Tournament	Tier	Surface	Partner	Opponents	Score
Loss	0–1	Sep 2022	ITF Vienna, Austria	W25	Clay	(Hungary) Amarissa Tóth	(Germany) Lena Papadakis (Czech Republic) Anna Sisková	6–7^{(8)}, 4–6
Win	1–1	Sep 2023	ITF Santa Margherita di Pula, Italy	W25	Clay	(Germany) Katharina Hobgarski	(France) Yasmine Mansouri (Italy) Miriana Tona	6–1, 6–2
Loss	1–2	Jun 2024	ITF Tarvisio, Italy	W35	Clay	(Italy) Miriana Tona	Anastasia Sukhotina; Anna Zyryanova	6–7^{(3)}, 2–6
Win	2–2	Jul 2024	ITF Torino, Italy	W35	Clay	(Slovenia) Pia Lovrič	(Argentina) Julieta Lara Estable (Chile) Fernanda Labraña	1–6, 6–2, [12–10]
Win	3–2	Aug 2024	Zagreb Open, Croatia	W50	Clay	(Hungary) Amarissa Tóth	(Bulgaria) Lia Karatancheva (Greece) Sapfo Sakellaridi	6–4, 6–3
Loss	3–3	Aug 2024	ITF Kuršumlijska Banja, Serbia	W75	Clay	(Croatia) Tara Würth	(Croatia) Petra Marčinko (Serbia) Lola Radivojević	6–7^{(5)}, 4–6
Loss	3–4	Aug 2024	ITF Trieste, Italy	W35	Clay	(Hungary) Amarissa Tóth	(Italy) Anastasia Abbagnato (Bosnia and Herzegovina) Anita Wagner	3–6, 6–4, [9–11]
Win	4–4	Sep 2024	Šibenik Open, Croatia	W75	Clay	(Hungary) Amarissa Tóth	(Cyprus) Raluca Șerban (Romania) Anca Todoni	2–1 ret.
Win	5–4	Jan 2025	ITF Monastir, Tunisia	W15	Hard	(Serbia) Elena Milovanović	Maria Golovina (Kazakhstan) Aruzhan Sagandikova	6–4, 6–4
Loss	5–5	Feb 2025	ITF Antalya, Turkey	W15	Clay	(Japan) Yuki Naito	(Italy) Vittoria Paganetti (Italy) Lisa Pigato	3–6, 4–6
Loss	5–6	Mar 2025	ITF Sabadell, Spain	W35	Clay	(Slovenia) Pia Lovrič	(Spain) Aliona Bolsova (Switzerland) Ylena In-Albon	4–6, 0–6
Loss	5–7	Sep 2025	ITF San Rafael, United States	W35	Hard	(Luxembourg) Marie Weckerle	(Italy) Francesca Pace (Poland) Zuzanna Pawlikowska	6–4, 3–6, [5–10]

== Junior Grand Slam finals ==
=== Girls' doubles ===
Result	Year	Tournament	Surface	Partner	Opponents	Score
Loss	2020	Australian Open	Hard	(United Kingdom) Matilda Mutavdzic	(Philippines) Alex Eala (Indonesia) Priska Madelyn Nugroho	1–6, 2–6
