= Lola Radivojević =

Serbian tennis player (born 2005)

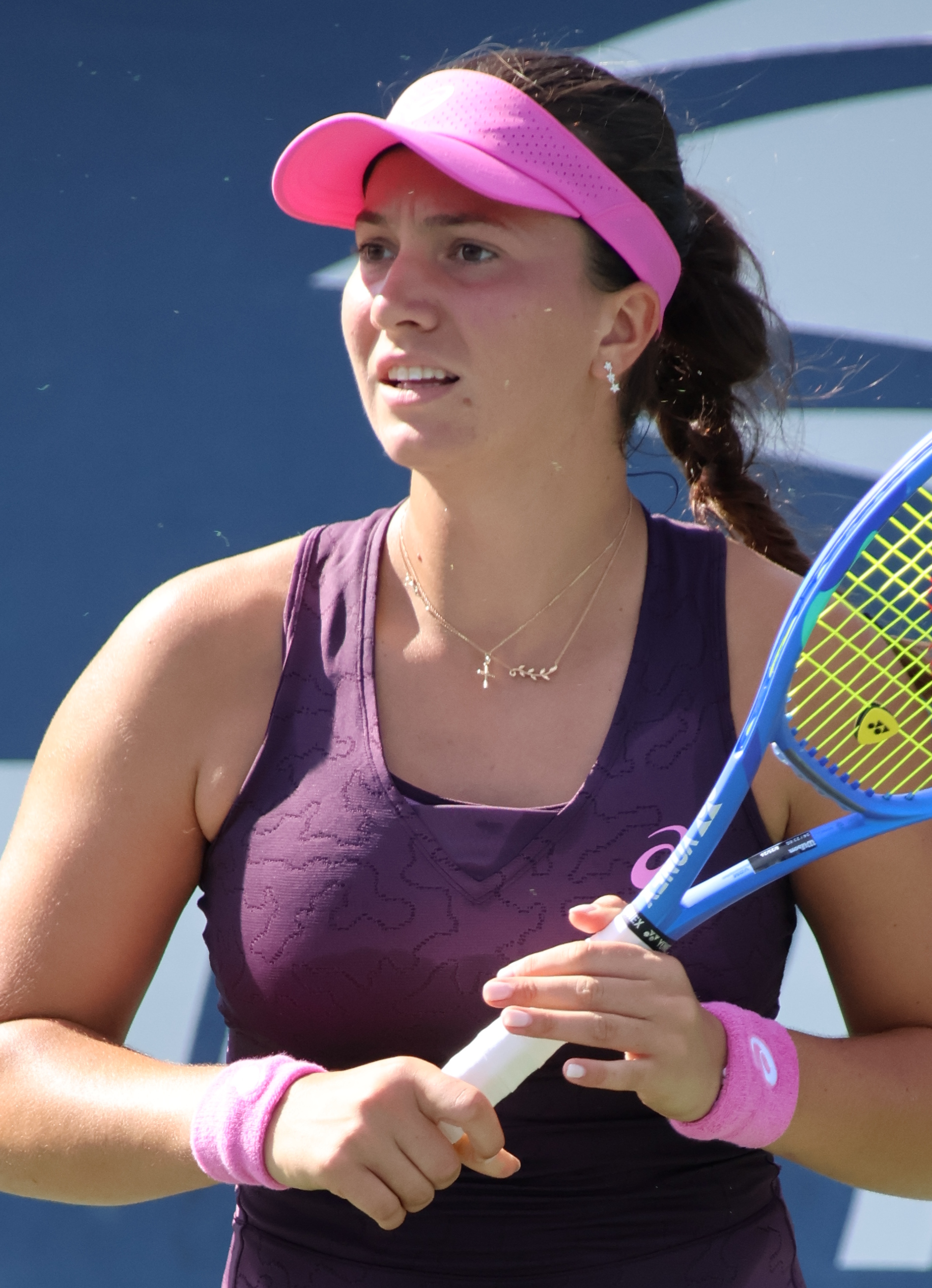
- Radivojevic at the 2026 US Open
- Country (sports): Serbia
- Residence: Belgrade, Serbia
- Born: 2 January 2005 (age 21) Prokuplje, Serbia and Montenegro
- Height: 1.82 m (6 ft 0 in)
- Plays: Right-handed
- Coach: Veljko Radojičić
- Prize money: $453,375

Singles
- Career record: 172–114
- Career titles: 8 ITF
- Highest ranking: No. 137 (5 January 2026)
- Current ranking: No. 150 (31 August 2026)

Grand Slam singles results
- Australian Open: Q2 (2026)
- French Open: Q3 (2025)
- Wimbledon: Q2 (2025)
- US Open: Q2 (2026)

Doubles
- Career record: 34–44
- Career titles: 2 ITF
- Highest ranking: No. 357 (10 February 2025)
- Current ranking: No. 1,315 (31 August 2026)

Team competitions
- Fed Cup: 10–14 (singles 8–10)
- Last updated on: 10 September 2026.

Lola Radivojević (Serbian Cyrillic: Лола Радивојевић; born 2 January 2005) is a Serbian tennis player. She has won eight singles titles and two doubles titles on the ITF Circuit. On 5 January 2026, she reached her career-high singles ranking of world No. 137. On 10 February 2025, she peaked at No. 357 in the WTA doubles rankings.

== Early life and background ==
Radivojević was born in Prokuplje and started playing tennis at the age of five in her hometown of Blace. Two years later, she moved to Niš and trained at the local club and later was a member of the local tennis academy, while in 2019 she transferred to Novak Tennis Center in Belgrade.

== Career overview ==
=== Juniors ===
Radivojević made her junior major debut at the 2021 French Open.

==== Grand Slam performance ====
Singles:

- Australian Open: QF (2022)
- French Open: 1R (2021)
- Wimbledon: 1R (2021)
- US Open: –

Doubles:

- Australian Open: 1R (2022)
- French Open: 1R (2021)
- Wimbledon: 1R (2021)
- US Open: –

=== Professional ===
Radivojević made her WTA Tour debut at the 2021 Serbia Open, where she was granted a wildcard entry into the main draw in both singles and doubles. She lost both of her matches in the first round – in singles, she was defeated by lucky loser Viktoriya Tomova, while in doubles, she and partner Ivana Jorović lost to Dalila Jakupović and Yana Sizikova.

== National representation ==
She earned her first Billie Jean King Cup nomination in April 2021, against Canada in the 2020–21 Play-offs for the 2022 qualifying round but did not play in the tie. She played her first matches for Serbia Billie Jean King Cup team in April 2022 in Europe/Africa Zone Group I, while her lifetime win-loss record stands at 8–12.

== WTA 125 finals ==
=== Singles: 2 (2 runner-ups) ===
Result	W–L	Date	Tournament	Surface	Opponent	Score
Loss	0–1	Oct 2025	Internazionali di Calabria, Italy	Clay	(Czech Republic) Sára Bejlek	2–6, 7–6^{(7–1)}, 3–6
Loss	0–2	Oct 2025	Mallorca Championships, Spain	Clay	(Argentina) Solana Sierra	3–6, 1–6

== ITF Circuit finals ==
=== Singles: 14 (8 titles, 6 runner-ups) ===
Legend W60/75 tournaments (2–3) W50 tournaments (0–1) W25/35 tournaments (3–2) W15 tournaments (3–0)	Finals by surface Hard (2–0) Clay (6–6)

Result	W–L	Date	Tournament	Tier	Surface	Opponent	Score
Win	1–0	May 2022	ITF Heraklion, Greece	W15	Clay	(Greece) Martha Matoula	6–3, 6–3
Win	2–0	May 2022	ITF Heraklion, Greece	W15	Clay	(Greece) Dimitra Pavlou	6–0, 6–2
Win	3–0	Jun 2022	ITF Prokuplje, Serbia	W15	Clay	(Germany) Luisa Meyer auf der Heide	6–2, 6–3
Win	4–0	Jan 2023	ITF Monastir, Tunisia	W25	Hard	(Japan) Sakura Hosogi	6–1, 7–5
Loss	4–1	Jul 2023	Amstelveen Open, Netherlands	W60	Clay	(Estonia) Kaia Kanepi	2–6, 6–7^{(5)}
Loss	4–2	Jul 2023	ITF Darmstadt, Germany	W25	Clay	(Croatia) Tena Lukas	3–6, 4–6
Loss	4–3	May 2024	Zagreb Ladies Open, Croatia	W75	Clay	(Croatia) Tara Würth	5–7, 3–6
Win	5–3	May 2024	ITF Kuršumlijska Banja, Serbia	W35	Clay	(France) Sara Cakarevic	6–3, 6–4
Win	6–3	Aug 2024	ITF Kuršumlijska Banja, Serbia	W75	Clay	(Czech Republic) Barbora Palicová	6–4, 6–2
Loss	6–4	Aug 2024	Vrnjačka Banja Open, Serbia	W35	Clay	(Canada) Carson Branstine	6–7^{(5)}, 4–6
Loss	6–5	Aug 2024	ITF Meerbusch, Germany	W50	Clay	(Austria) Sinja Kraus	4–6, 3–6
Win	7–5	Sep 2024	ITF Kuršumlijska Banja, Serbia	W75	Clay	(Cyprus) Raluca Șerban	6–2, 7–6^{(7)}
Win	8–5	Aug 2025	ITF Heraklion, Greece	W35	Hard	(Belgium) Sofia Costoulas	6–0, 4–1 ret.
Loss	8–6	May 2026	ITF Kuršumlijska Banja, Serbia	W75	Clay	(Czech Republic) Laura Samson	3–6, 6–3, 5–7

=== Doubles: 3 (2 titles, 1 runner-up) ===
Legend
W75 tournaments (1–0)
W35 tournaments (0–1)
W15 tournaments (1–0)

Result	W–L	Date	Tournament	Tier	Surface	Partner	Opponents	Score
Win	1–0	May 2022	ITF Heraklion, Greece	W15	Clay	(Greece) Michaela Laki	(Australia) Gabriella Da Silva-Fick (Netherlands) Stéphanie Visscher	6–1, 4–6, [10–8]
Loss	1–1	Mar 2024	ITF Santa Margherita di Pula, Italy	W35	Clay	(Czech Republic) Lucie Havlíčková	(Greece) Sapfo Sakellaridi (Italy) Aurora Zantedeschi	4–6, 2–6
Win	2–1	Aug 2024	ITF Kuršumlijska Banja, Serbia	W75	Clay	(Croatia) Petra Marčinko	(Slovenia) Živa Falkner (Croatia) Tara Würth	7–6^{(5)}, 6–4

== Junior finals ==
=== ITF Junior Circuit ===
Legend
Category G1
Category G2
Category G3
Category G4
Category G5

==== Singles (3–1) ====
Result	W–L	Date	Tournament	Tier	Surface	Opponent	Score
Win	1–0	May 2019	ITF Niš, Serbia	G5	Clay	(Bulgaria) Ralitsa Alexandrova	1–6, 6–4, 6–3
Win	2–0	Jun 2019	ITF Nikšić, Montenegro	G5	Clay	(Russia) Eva Gartseva	6–3, 6–4
Win	3–0	Oct 2020	ITF Alanya, Turkey	G3	Clay	(Turkey) Melisa Ercan	6–4, 6–2
Loss	3–1	Oct 2020	ITF Istanbul, Turkey	G3	Hard	(Czech Republic) Linda Klimovičová	7–5, 0–6, 1–6

==== Doubles (3–5) ====
Result	W–L	Date	Tournament	Tier	Surface	Partner	Opponents	Score
Loss	0–1	Jun 2019	ITF Nikšić, Montenegro	G5	Clay	(Switzerland) Andjela Petrovic	(Russia) Ksenia Agureeva (Russia) Eva Gartseva	4–6, 7–6^{(1)}, [5–10]
Win	1–1	Sep 2019	ITF Zlatibor, Serbia	G5	Clay	(Switzerland) Andjela Petrovic	(Slovenia) Manca Lampret (Slovenia) Annika Planinšek	6–2, 6–0
Loss	1–2	Sep 2020	ITF Novi Sad, Serbia	G2	Clay	(Russia) Anastasiia Gureva	(Croatia) Petra Marčinko (Serbia) Tijana Sretenović	2–6, 4–6
Win	2–2	Oct 2020	ITF Alanya, Turkey	G3	Clay	(Russia) Ekaterina Maklakova	(Russia) Ksenia Zaytseva (Ukraine) Daria Yesypchuk	5–7, 7–6^{(3)}, [10–6]
Loss	2–3	Oct 2020	ITF Istanbul, Turkey	G3	Hard	(Czech Republic) Linda Klimovičová	(Russia) Anastasiia Gureva (Russia) Elena Pridankina	1–6, 3–6
Loss	2–4	Feb 2021	ITF Lambaré, Paraguay	G1	Clay	(Croatia) Petra Marčinko	(Canada) Annabelle Xu (United States) Valencia Xu	6–4, 1–6, [3–10]
Win	3–4	Feb 2021	ITF Porto Alegre, Brazil	G1	Clay	(Greece) Michaela Laki	(United States) Elizabeth Coleman (United States) Madison Sieg	6–4, 6–4
Loss	3–5	Jul 2021	ITF Roehampton, United Kingdom	G1	Grass	(Greece) Michaela Laki	(United States) Reese Brantmeier (United States) Ashlyn Krueger	4–6, 2–6
