= 2024 ITF Women's World Tennis Tour (October–December) =

Tennis competition

The 2024 ITF Women's World Tennis Tour was the 2024 edition of the second-tier tour for women's professional tennis. It was organised by the International Tennis Federation and was a tier below the WTA Tour. The ITF Women's World Tennis Tour included tournaments in five categories with prize money ranging from $15,000 up to $100,000.

== Key ==
Category
W100 tournaments ($100,000)
W75 tournaments ($60,000)
W50 tournaments ($40,000)
W35 tournaments ($25,000)
W15 tournaments ($15,000)

== Month ==
=== October ===
| Week of | Tournament | Winner | Runners-up | Semifinalists | Quarterfinalists |
|---|---|---|---|---|---|
| October 7 | Women's TEC Cup; Cornellà de Llobregat, Spain; Hard; W100; Singles - Doubles | (Serbia) Olga Danilović; 6–2, 6–0 | (Netherlands) Arantxa Rus | Polina Kudermetova (United States) Ann Li | (Spain) Nuria Párrizas Díaz (Spain) Kaitlin Quevedo; Maria Timofeeva (Spain) Marina Bassols Ribera |
| October 7 | Women's TEC Cup; Cornellà de Llobregat, Spain; Hard; W100; Singles - Doubles | (Spain) Yvonne Cavallé Reimers (Netherlands) Eva Vedder; 7–5, 7–6^{(7–5)} | (Algeria) Inès Ibbou (Switzerland) Naïma Karamoko | Polina Kudermetova (United States) Ann Li | (Spain) Nuria Párrizas Díaz (Spain) Kaitlin Quevedo; Maria Timofeeva (Spain) Marina Bassols Ribera |
| October 7 | Slovak Open; Bratislava, Slovakia; Hard (i); W75; Singles - Doubles | (Slovakia) Mia Pohánková; 2–6, 6–4, 6–2 | (Slovakia) Renáta Jamrichová | (France) Océane Dodin (Croatia) Antonia Ružić | (Switzerland) Céline Naef; Elena Pridankina (France) Elsa Jacquemot (Slovakia) Radka Zelníčková |
| October 7 | Slovak Open; Bratislava, Slovakia; Hard (i); W75; Singles - Doubles | (Netherlands) Isabelle Haverlag; Elena Pridankina; 7–5, 6–2 | (Slovakia) Katarína Kužmová (Slovakia) Nina Vargová | (France) Océane Dodin (Croatia) Antonia Ružić | (Switzerland) Céline Naef; Elena Pridankina (France) Elsa Jacquemot (Slovakia) Radka Zelníčková |
| October 7 | Edmond Open; Edmond, United States; Hard; W75; Singles - Doubles | (United States) Mary Stoiana; 7–5, 6–3 | (United States) Alana Smith | (Ukraine) Anastasia Lopata (Canada) Victoria Mboko | (Czech Republic) Darja Viďmanová (Ukraine) Valeriya Strakhova; Anastasia Tikhonova (United States) Elizabeth Mandlik |
| October 7 | Edmond Open; Edmond, United States; Hard; W75; Singles - Doubles | (United States) Kayla Day (Australia) Jaimee Fourlis; 7–5, 7–5 | (United States) Sophie Chang (United States) Rasheeda McAdoo | (Ukraine) Anastasia Lopata (Canada) Victoria Mboko | (Czech Republic) Darja Viďmanová (Ukraine) Valeriya Strakhova; Anastasia Tikhonova (United States) Elizabeth Mandlik |
| October 7 | Quinta do Lago, Portugal; Hard; W50; Singles and doubles draws | Kristina Dmitruk; 6–4, 6–3 | (France) Yasmine Mansouri | (France) Kristina Mladenovic (France) Amandine Monnot | (Portugal) Matilde Jorge (Lithuania) Justina Mikulskytė (Malta) Francesca Curmi (Serbia) Mia Ristić |
| October 7 | Quinta do Lago, Portugal; Hard; W50; Singles and doubles draws | (Portugal) Matilde Jorge (Lithuania) Justina Mikulskytė; 2–6, 6–4, [14–12] | (Belgium) Magali Kempen (Belgium) Lara Salden | (France) Kristina Mladenovic (France) Amandine Monnot | (Portugal) Matilde Jorge (Lithuania) Justina Mikulskytė (Malta) Francesca Curmi (Serbia) Mia Ristić |
| October 7 | Cairns, Australia; Hard; W35; Singles and doubles draws | (Australia) Destanee Aiava; 6–2, 4–6, 7–5 | (Australia) Maddison Inglis | (Australia) Emerson Jones (Australia) Elena Micic | (Australia) Lizette Cabrera (Australia) Petra Hule (Australia) Alexandra Bozovic (Australia) Gabriella Da Silva-Fick |
| October 7 | Cairns, Australia; Hard; W35; Singles and doubles draws | (Australia) Petra Hule (Australia) Alana Parnaby; 3–6, 6–2, [10–2] | (Australia) Destanee Aiava (Australia) Alexandra Bozovic | (Australia) Emerson Jones (Australia) Elena Micic | (Australia) Lizette Cabrera (Australia) Petra Hule (Australia) Alexandra Bozovic (Australia) Gabriella Da Silva-Fick |
| October 7 | Edmonton, Canada; Hard (i); W35; Singles and doubles draws | (France) Julie Belgraver; 6–1, 3–6, 6–2 | (Canada) Ariana Arseneault | (Netherlands) Anouk Koevermans (Switzerland) Jenny Dürst | (United States) Jessica Failla (Canada) Cadence Brace (United States) Lea Ma (Canada) Stacey Fung |
| October 7 | Edmonton, Canada; Hard (i); W35; Singles and doubles draws | (Canada) Kayla Cross (United States) Maribella Zamarripa; 6–3, 6–1 | (United States) Jessica Failla (United States) Anna Rogers | (Netherlands) Anouk Koevermans (Switzerland) Jenny Dürst | (United States) Jessica Failla (Canada) Cadence Brace (United States) Lea Ma (Canada) Stacey Fung |
| October 7 | Open de Touraine; Joué-lès-Tours, France; Hard (i); W35; Singles and doubles draws | Yuliya Hatouka; 7–6^{(7–4)}, 7–6^{(10–8)} | (Turkey) Ayla Aksu | Vitalia Diatchenko (Finland) Anastasia Kulikova | (Germany) Mara Guth (France) Audrey Albié (Germany) Selina Dal (Slovenia) Dalila Jakupović |
| October 7 | Open de Touraine; Joué-lès-Tours, France; Hard (i); W35; Singles and doubles draws | (United Kingdom) Sarah Beth Grey (Switzerland) Leonie Küng; 6–4, 6–2 | (Ukraine) Anastasiia Firman (Switzerland) Chelsea Fontenel | Vitalia Diatchenko (Finland) Anastasia Kulikova | (Germany) Mara Guth (France) Audrey Albié (Germany) Selina Dal (Slovenia) Dalila Jakupović |
| October 7 | Santa Margherita di Pula, Italy; Clay; W35; Singles and doubles draws | (Italy) Matilde Paoletti; 3–6, 6–2, 6–2 | (Romania) Irina Bara | (Italy) Alessandra Mazzola (Burundi) Sada Nahimana | (France) Alice Ramé (Italy) Anastasia Abbagnato (Italy) Tatiana Pieri (Australia) Tina Nadine Smith |
| October 7 | Santa Margherita di Pula, Italy; Clay; W35; Singles and doubles draws | (Italy) Anastasia Abbagnato (Italy) Miriana Tona; 6–7^{(3–7)}, 6–3, [12–10] | (United States) Jaeda Daniel (Burundi) Sada Nahimana | (Italy) Alessandra Mazzola (Burundi) Sada Nahimana | (France) Alice Ramé (Italy) Anastasia Abbagnato (Italy) Tatiana Pieri (Australia) Tina Nadine Smith |
| October 7 | Seville, Spain; Clay; W35; Singles and doubles draws | (Austria) Sinja Kraus; 2–6, 6–2, 6–3 | (Belgium) Marie Benoît | (Spain) Aliona Bolsova (Spain) Carlota Martínez Círez | (Spain) Cristina Díaz Adrover (Spain) Ángela Fita Boluda (Croatia) Tara Würth (Spain) Paula Arias Manjón |
| October 7 | Seville, Spain; Clay; W35; Singles and doubles draws | (Spain) Ángela Fita Boluda (Switzerland) Ylena In-Albon; 6–2, 6–1 | (Spain) Aliona Bolsova (Greece) Martha Matoula | (Spain) Aliona Bolsova (Spain) Carlota Martínez Círez | (Spain) Cristina Díaz Adrover (Spain) Ángela Fita Boluda (Croatia) Tara Würth (Spain) Paula Arias Manjón |
| October 7 | Bakersfield, United States; Hard; W35; Singles and doubles draws | (United States) Amelia Honer; 6–4, 6–3 | (United States) Julieta Pareja | (United States) Hanna Chang (United States) Kate Fakih | (United States) Solymar Colling (Spain) Raquel González Vilar (India) Sahaja Yamalapalli (China) Huang Yujia |
| October 7 | Bakersfield, United States; Hard; W35; Singles and doubles draws | (United States) Eryn Cayetano (United States) India Houghton; 7–6^{(10–8)}, 6–2 | (Japan) Mana Ayukawa (China) Huang Yujia | (United States) Hanna Chang (United States) Kate Fakih | (United States) Solymar Colling (Spain) Raquel González Vilar (India) Sahaja Yamalapalli (China) Huang Yujia |
| October 7 | Tsaghkadzor, Armenia; Clay; W15; Singles and doubles draws | Rada Zolotareva; 6–1, 6–2 | Kristina Kroitor | (Ukraine) Alisa Baranovska (Hungary) Luca Udvardy | Valeriya Yushchenko; Ekaterina Agureeva (Ukraine) Yelyzaveta Kotliar; Maria Golovina |
| October 7 | Tsaghkadzor, Armenia; Clay; W15; Singles and doubles draws | Ekaterina Agureeva; Rada Zolotareva; 6–4, 6–3 | Alina Yuneva; Valeriya Yushchenko | (Ukraine) Alisa Baranovska (Hungary) Luca Udvardy | Valeriya Yushchenko; Ekaterina Agureeva (Ukraine) Yelyzaveta Kotliar; Maria Golovina |
| October 7 | Sharm El Sheikh, Egypt; Hard; W15; Singles and doubles draws | Anastasia Gasanova; 6–4, 6–0 | (Romania) Alexandra Iordache | (Germany) Mia Mack (Ukraine) Kateryna Lazarenko | (United States) Dasha Ivanova (Kazakhstan) Sandugash Kenzhibayeva (Poland) Zuzanna Pawlikowska (Italy) Syria La Cerra |
| October 7 | Sharm El Sheikh, Egypt; Hard; W15; Singles and doubles draws | (Germany) Mia Mack (Germany) Vivien Sandberg; 6–4, 3–6, [12–10] | (Romania) Mara Gae (Poland) Zuzanna Pawlikowska | (Germany) Mia Mack (Ukraine) Kateryna Lazarenko | (United States) Dasha Ivanova (Kazakhstan) Sandugash Kenzhibayeva (Poland) Zuzanna Pawlikowska (Italy) Syria La Cerra |
| October 7 | Heraklion, Greece; Clay; W15; Singles and doubles draws | (Slovenia) Pia Lovrič; 6–3, 6–3 | (Bulgaria) Denislava Glushkova | (Lithuania) Patricija Paukštytė (Germany) Eva Marie Voracek | (Italy) Gaia Squarcialupi (Romania) Simona Ogescu (Netherlands) Loes Ebeling Koning (Belgium) Tilwith Di Girolami |
| October 7 | Heraklion, Greece; Clay; W15; Singles and doubles draws | (Romania) Simona Ogescu (Romania) Ioana Teodora Sava; 6–2, 0–6, [10–6] | (Belgium) Tilwith Di Girolami (Lithuania) Patricija Paukštytė | (Lithuania) Patricija Paukštytė (Germany) Eva Marie Voracek | (Italy) Gaia Squarcialupi (Romania) Simona Ogescu (Netherlands) Loes Ebeling Koning (Belgium) Tilwith Di Girolami |
| October 7 | Mysuru, India; Hard; W15; Singles and doubles draws | (United States) Jessie Aney; 3–6, 6–3, 7–6^{(8–6)} | (India) Shrivalli Bhamidipaty | (India) Riya Bhatia (India) Lakshmi Prabha Arunkumar | (India) Akanksha Dileep Nitture (India) Smriti Bhasin (Denmark) Elena Jamshidi (India) Pooja Ingale |
| October 7 | Mysuru, India; Hard; W15; Singles and doubles draws | (United States) Jessie Aney (India) Riya Bhatia; 6–1, 6–1 | (India) Akanksha Dileep Nitture (India) Soha Sadiq | (India) Riya Bhatia (India) Lakshmi Prabha Arunkumar | (India) Akanksha Dileep Nitture (India) Smriti Bhasin (Denmark) Elena Jamshidi (India) Pooja Ingale |
| October 7 | Monastir, Tunisia; Hard; W15; Singles and doubles draws | (Cyprus) Daria Frayman; 6–3, 4–6, 7–6^{(7–1)} | (Germany) Luisa Meyer auf der Heide | (Italy) Vittoria Segattini (United States) Lilian Poling | (Belgium) Vicky Van De Peer (Germany) Tessa Johanna Brockmann (Austria) Arabella Koller (Italy) Federica Sacco |
| October 7 | Monastir, Tunisia; Hard; W15; Singles and doubles draws | (Germany) Luisa Meyer auf der Heide (Germany) Anja Wildgruber; 6–4, 6–3 | (Austria) Arabella Koller (Poland) Dominika Podhajecka | (Italy) Vittoria Segattini (United States) Lilian Poling | (Belgium) Vicky Van De Peer (Germany) Tessa Johanna Brockmann (Austria) Arabella Koller (Italy) Federica Sacco |
| October 14 | GB Pro-Series Shrewsbury; Shrewsbury, United Kingdom; Hard (i); W100; Singles - Doubles | (United Kingdom) Sonay Kartal; 7–5, 4–1 ret. | (United Kingdom) Heather Watson | (Switzerland) Simona Waltert (France) Océane Dodin | (Ukraine) Daria Snigur (France) Chloe Paquet (United Kingdom) Mingge Xu; Oksana Selekhmeteva |
| October 14 | GB Pro-Series Shrewsbury; Shrewsbury, United Kingdom; Hard (i); W100; Singles - Doubles | (United Kingdom) Amelia Rajecki (United Kingdom) Mingge Xu; 6–4, 6–1 | (United Kingdom) Hannah Klugman (United Kingdom) Ranah Stoiber | (Switzerland) Simona Waltert (France) Océane Dodin | (Ukraine) Daria Snigur (France) Chloe Paquet (United Kingdom) Mingge Xu; Oksana Selekhmeteva |
| October 14 | Tennis Classic of Macon; Macon, United States; Hard; W100; Singles - Doubles | Anna Blinkova; 2–6, 6–2, 7–6^{(7–4)} | (United States) Ann Li | (United States) Lauren Davis (Poland) Katarzyna Kawa | (Mexico) Renata Zarazúa (Italy) Lucrezia Stefanini (United States) Lea Ma (Czech Republic) Darja Viďmanová |
| October 14 | Tennis Classic of Macon; Macon, United States; Hard; W100; Singles - Doubles | (United States) Sophie Chang (Poland) Katarzyna Kawa; 7–5, 6–4 | (Brazil) Ingrid Martins (United States) Quinn Gleason | (United States) Lauren Davis (Poland) Katarzyna Kawa | (Mexico) Renata Zarazúa (Italy) Lucrezia Stefanini (United States) Lea Ma (Czech Republic) Darja Viďmanová |
| October 14 | Calgary Challenger; Calgary, Canada; Hard (i); W75; Singles - Doubles | (Canada) Rebecca Marino; 7–5, 6–4 | (United States) Anna Rogers | (Germany) Tatjana Maria (Canada) Cadence Brace | (United States) Fiona Crawley (Canada) Stacey Fung (Canada) Kayla Cross (Netherlands) Anouk Koevermans |
| October 14 | Calgary Challenger; Calgary, Canada; Hard (i); W75; Singles - Doubles | (Canada) Kayla Cross (United States) Maribella Zamarripa; 6–7^{(3–7)}, 7–5, [12–10] | (United States) Robin Anderson (United States) Dalayna Hewitt | (Germany) Tatjana Maria (Canada) Cadence Brace | (United States) Fiona Crawley (Canada) Stacey Fung (Canada) Kayla Cross (Netherlands) Anouk Koevermans |
| October 14 | Cherbourg-en-Cotentin, France; Hard (i); W50; Singles and doubles draws | Anastasia Zakharova; 3–6, 6–1, 6–4 | (Czech Republic) Barbora Palicová | Yuliya Hatouka (Denmark) Olga Helmi | (Spain) Irene Burillo Escorihuela (France) Yaroslava Bartashevich (France) Émeline Dartron (Germany) Selina Dal |
| October 14 | Cherbourg-en-Cotentin, France; Hard (i); W50; Singles and doubles draws | (Algeria) Inès Ibbou (Switzerland) Naïma Karamoko; 4–6, 7–6^{(7–3)}, [10–7] | (France) Tiphanie Lemaître; Ekaterina Ovcharenko | Yuliya Hatouka (Denmark) Olga Helmi | (Spain) Irene Burillo Escorihuela (France) Yaroslava Bartashevich (France) Émeline Dartron (Germany) Selina Dal |
| October 14 | Kayseri, Turkey; Hard; W50; Singles and doubles draws | (Kazakhstan) Zarina Diyas; 0–6, 6–4, 6–3 | Aliona Falei | Ekaterina Maklakova (Bulgaria) Isabella Shinikova | (Turkey) Deniz Dilek (Slovenia) Dalila Jakupović (Latvia) Adelina Lachinova; Kira Pavlova |
| October 14 | Kayseri, Turkey; Hard; W50; Singles and doubles draws | (Romania) Briana Szabó (Romania) Patricia Maria Țig; 3–6, 6–4, [10–8] | (Turkey) Melis Sezer (Bulgaria) Isabella Shinikova | Ekaterina Maklakova (Bulgaria) Isabella Shinikova | (Turkey) Deniz Dilek (Slovenia) Dalila Jakupović (Latvia) Adelina Lachinova; Kira Pavlova |
| October 14 | Huzhou, China; Hard; W35; Singles and doubles draws | (Hong Kong) Cody Wong; 7–6^{(7–5)}, 6–3 | (Thailand) Thasaporn Naklo | (United States) Hina Inoue (China) Li Zongyu | (Indonesia) Priska Madelyn Nugroho; Evialina Laskevich (China) Liu Fangzhou; Ekaterina Yashina |
| October 14 | Huzhou, China; Hard; W35; Singles and doubles draws | Sofya Lansere; Ekaterina Shalimova; 6–2, 6–3 | (China) Xiao Zhenghua (China) Ye Qiuyu | (United States) Hina Inoue (China) Li Zongyu | (Indonesia) Priska Madelyn Nugroho; Evialina Laskevich (China) Liu Fangzhou; Ekaterina Yashina |
| October 14 | Heraklion, Greece; Clay; W35; Singles and doubles draws | (Ukraine) Oleksandra Oliynykova; 6–4, 6–1 | (Romania) Irina Bara | Ekaterina Makarova (Serbia) Natalija Senić | (Slovenia) Pia Lovrič (Romania) Cristina Dinu (Slovakia) Sofia Milatová (Bulgaria) Denislava Glushkova |
| October 14 | Heraklion, Greece; Clay; W35; Singles and doubles draws | (Belgium) Marie Benoit; Ekaterina Makarova; 7–6^{(7–4)}, 6–1 | (Brazil) Luiza Fullana (Greece) Michaela Laki | Ekaterina Makarova (Serbia) Natalija Senić | (Slovenia) Pia Lovrič (Romania) Cristina Dinu (Slovakia) Sofia Milatová (Bulgaria) Denislava Glushkova |
| October 14 | Santa Margherita di Pula, Italy; Clay; W35; Singles and doubles draws | (Italy) Nicole Fossa Huergo; 6–0, 3–6, 6–2 | (Italy) Federica Urgesi | (Spain) Aliona Bolsova (Spain) Carlota Martínez Círez | (Bulgaria) Rositsa Dencheva (Argentina) María Florencia Urrutia (Austria) Julia Grabher (Italy) Diletta Cherubini |
| October 14 | Santa Margherita di Pula, Italy; Clay; W35; Singles and doubles draws | (Finland) Laura Hietaranta (Greece) Sapfo Sakellaridi; 6–3, 6–4 | (Italy) Alessandra Mazzola (Italy) Federica Urgesi | (Spain) Aliona Bolsova (Spain) Carlota Martínez Círez | (Bulgaria) Rositsa Dencheva (Argentina) María Florencia Urrutia (Austria) Julia Grabher (Italy) Diletta Cherubini |
| October 14 | Faro, Portugal; Hard; W35; Singles and doubles draws | (Poland) Monika Stankiewicz; 7–6^{(7–3)}, 6–3 | (Portugal) Matilde Jorge | (Austria) Sinja Kraus (France) Yasmine Mansouri | (Spain) Eva Guerrero Álvarez (Poland) Gina Feistel (Norway) Malene Helgø (Switzerland) Leonie Küng |
| October 14 | Faro, Portugal; Hard; W35; Singles and doubles draws | (Poland) Weronika Falkowska (Netherlands) Stéphanie Visscher; 6–4, 2–6, [10–5] | (Bulgaria) Lia Karatancheva (Latvia) Diāna Marcinkēviča | (Austria) Sinja Kraus (France) Yasmine Mansouri | (Spain) Eva Guerrero Álvarez (Poland) Gina Feistel (Norway) Malene Helgø (Switzerland) Leonie Küng |
| October 14 | Trelew, Argentina; Hard (i); W15; Singles and doubles draws | (Chile) Jimar Gerald Gonzalez; 7–6^{(10–8)}, 6–4 | (Argentina) Victoria Bosio | (Brazil) Carolina Bohrer Martins (Peru) Michela Castro Zunino | (Ecuador) Camila Romero (Brazil) Camilla Bossi (Brazil) Sofia Mendonça (Brazil) Júlia Konishi Camargo Silva |
| October 14 | Trelew, Argentina; Hard (i); W15; Singles and doubles draws | (Argentina) Luciana Moyano (Ecuador) Camila Romero; 6–7^{(2–7)}, 7–5, [10–6] | (Argentina) Lourdes Ayala (Argentina) Justina María González Daniele | (Brazil) Carolina Bohrer Martins (Peru) Michela Castro Zunino | (Ecuador) Camila Romero (Brazil) Camilla Bossi (Brazil) Sofia Mendonça (Brazil) Júlia Konishi Camargo Silva |
| October 14 | Tsaghkadzor, Armenia; Clay; W15; Singles and doubles draws | Kristina Kroitor; 6–2, 6–4 | Valeriya Yushchenko | Anna Ureke; Maria Golovina | Maria Mikhailova (Romania) Anastasia Safta (Ukraine) Alisa Baranovska (Hungary) Luca Udvardy |
| October 14 | Tsaghkadzor, Armenia; Clay; W15; Singles and doubles draws | Ekaterina Agureeva; Rada Zolotareva; 7–6^{(7–4)}, 6–3 | Alina Yuneva; Valeriya Yushchenko | Anna Ureke; Maria Golovina | Maria Mikhailova (Romania) Anastasia Safta (Ukraine) Alisa Baranovska (Hungary) Luca Udvardy |
| October 14 | Bol, Croatia; Clay; W15; Singles and doubles draws | (Romania) Arina Gabriela Vasilescu; 6–2, 4–6, 6–4 | (Spain) Cristina Díaz Adrover | (Germany) Sina Herrmann (Germany) Chantal Sauvant | (Slovenia) Živa Falkner (Italy) Irene Lavino (Czech Republic) Linda Ševčíková (Czech Republic) Nikola Břečková |
| October 14 | Bol, Croatia; Clay; W15; Singles and doubles draws | (Slovakia) Laura Svatíková (Romania) Arina Gabriela Vasilescu; 6–2, 6–1 | Victoria Borodulina (Slovenia) Manca Pislak | (Germany) Sina Herrmann (Germany) Chantal Sauvant | (Slovenia) Živa Falkner (Italy) Irene Lavino (Czech Republic) Linda Ševčíková (Czech Republic) Nikola Břečková |
| October 14 | Sharm El Sheikh, Egypt; Hard; W15; Singles and doubles draws | Anastasia Gasanova; 6–4, 6–0 | (Kosovo) Arlinda Rushiti | (Egypt) Sandra Samir (Egypt) Lamis Alhussein Abdel Aziz | (United States) Dasha Ivanova (Romania) Karola Patricia Bejenaru (Kazakhstan) Sandugash Kenzhibayeva; Ustiniya Lekomtseva |
| October 14 | Sharm El Sheikh, Egypt; Hard; W15; Singles and doubles draws | (Germany) Mia Mack (Germany) Vivien Sandberg; 6–0, 6–3 | Alisa Kummel; Ekaterina Makarova | (Egypt) Sandra Samir (Egypt) Lamis Alhussein Abdel Aziz | (United States) Dasha Ivanova (Romania) Karola Patricia Bejenaru (Kazakhstan) Sandugash Kenzhibayeva; Ustiniya Lekomtseva |
| October 14 | Bengaluru, India; Hard; W15; Singles and doubles draws | (India) Tanisha Kashyap; 6–7^{(5–7)}, 6–1, 6–1 | (India) Akanksha Dileep Nitture | (New Caledonia) Carolann Delaunay (India) Vaishnavi Adkar | (United States) Paola Lopez (India) Soha Sadiq (India) Abhaya Vemuri; Arina Arifullina |
| October 14 | Bengaluru, India; Hard; W15; Singles and doubles draws | (India) Humera Baharmus (India) Pooja Ingale; 3–6, 6–0, [10–6] | (India) Akanksha Dileep Nitture (India) Soha Sadiq | (New Caledonia) Carolann Delaunay (India) Vaishnavi Adkar | (United States) Paola Lopez (India) Soha Sadiq (India) Abhaya Vemuri; Arina Arifullina |
| October 14 | Huamantla, Mexico; Hard; W15; Singles and doubles draws | (United States) Malaika Rapolu; 7–6^{(7–3)}, 7–5 | (Canada) Dasha Plekhanova | (Mexico) María Fernanda Navarro Oliva (United States) Sabastiani León | (Serbia) Katarina Jokić (Colombia) María Camila Torres Murcia (United States) Emily De Oliveira (Colombia) Yuliana Monroy |
| October 14 | Huamantla, Mexico; Hard; W15; Singles and doubles draws | (United States) Malaika Rapolu (Estonia) Liisa Varul; 7–6^{(7–4)}, 4–6, [10–7] | (Mexico) Claudia Sofía Martínez Solís (Mexico) María Fernanda Navarro Oliva | (Mexico) María Fernanda Navarro Oliva (United States) Sabastiani León | (Serbia) Katarina Jokić (Colombia) María Camila Torres Murcia (United States) Emily De Oliveira (Colombia) Yuliana Monroy |
| October 14 | Sant Vicenç de Torelló, Spain; Hard; W15; Singles and doubles draws | (Spain) Ruth Roura Llaverias; 6–1, 7–6^{(8–6)} | (Netherlands) Joy de Zeeuw | (France) Laïa Petretic (Hungary) Adrienn Nagy | (Estonia) Maileen Nuudi (France) Marine Szostak (Germany) Phillippa Preugschat (China) Mi Tianmi |
| October 14 | Sant Vicenç de Torelló, Spain; Hard; W15; Singles and doubles draws | (Netherlands) Joy de Zeeuw (Spain) Ruth Roura Llaverias; 2–6, 6–3, [11–9] | (Netherlands) Rose Marie Nijkamp (Netherlands) Isis Louise van den Broek | (France) Laïa Petretic (Hungary) Adrienn Nagy | (Estonia) Maileen Nuudi (France) Marine Szostak (Germany) Phillippa Preugschat (China) Mi Tianmi |
| October 14 | Monastir, Tunisia; Hard; W15; Singles and doubles draws | (France) Nina Radovanovic; 6–3, 6–1 | (Germany) Josy Daems | (Italy) Federica Sacco (Austria) Arabella Koller | (Austria) Ekaterina Perelygina (France) Alice Soulié (Ukraine) Daria Yesypchuk (Italy) Matilde Mariani |
| October 14 | Monastir, Tunisia; Hard; W15; Singles and doubles draws | (United States) Julia Adams (United States) Marcella Cruz; 6–3, 6–3 | (Switzerland) Nadine Keller (Austria) Arabella Koller | (Italy) Federica Sacco (Austria) Arabella Koller | (Austria) Ekaterina Perelygina (France) Alice Soulié (Ukraine) Daria Yesypchuk (Italy) Matilde Mariani |
| October 21 | Torneig Internacional Els Gorchs; Les Franqueses del Vallès, Spain; Hard; W100; Singles - Doubles | Anastasia Zakharova; 6–3, 6–1 | Alina Charaeva | (France) Kristina Mladenovic (Slovakia) Anna Karolína Schmiedlová | (Slovakia) Renáta Jamrichová (Spain) Andrea Lázaro García (Hungary) Dalma Gálfi (Serbia) Lola Radivojević |
| October 21 | Torneig Internacional Els Gorchs; Les Franqueses del Vallès, Spain; Hard; W100; Singles - Doubles | Alina Charaeva; Ekaterina Reyngold; 6–2, 7–6^{(7–2)} | (Germany) Mina Hodzic (Germany) Caroline Werner | (France) Kristina Mladenovic (Slovakia) Anna Karolína Schmiedlová | (Slovakia) Renáta Jamrichová (Spain) Andrea Lázaro García (Hungary) Dalma Gálfi (Serbia) Lola Radivojević |
| October 21 | Tyler Pro Challenge; Tyler, United States; Hard; W100; Singles and doubles draws | (Mexico) Renata Zarazúa; 6–4, 6–2 | (United States) Iva Jovic | (United States) Alana Smith (Australia) Jaimee Fourlis | (United States) Clervie Ngounoue (United States) Usue Maitane Arconada (Poland) Katarzyna Kawa (United States) Mary Stoiana |
| October 21 | Tyler Pro Challenge; Tyler, United States; Hard; W100; Singles and doubles draws | (United States) Clervie Ngounoue (Australia) Alexandra Osborne; 6–2, 6–3 | (United States) Mary Lewis (United States) Brandy Walker | (United States) Alana Smith (Australia) Jaimee Fourlis | (United States) Clervie Ngounoue (United States) Usue Maitane Arconada (Poland) Katarzyna Kawa (United States) Mary Stoiana |
| October 21 | City of Playford Tennis International; Playford, Australia; Hard; W75; Singles - Doubles | (Australia) Maddison Inglis; 7–6^{(9–7)}, 5–7, 6–1 | (Japan) Himeno Sakatsume | (Australia) Talia Gibson (Australia) Taylah Preston | (India) Shrivalli Bhamidipaty (Japan) Sakura Hosogi (Australia) Destanee Aiava (Australia) Petra Hule |
| October 21 | City of Playford Tennis International; Playford, Australia; Hard; W75; Singles - Doubles | (Australia) Alexandra Bozovic (Australia) Petra Hule; 6–4, 6–3 | (Australia) Lizette Cabrera (Australia) Taylah Preston | (Australia) Talia Gibson (Australia) Taylah Preston | (India) Shrivalli Bhamidipaty (Japan) Sakura Hosogi (Australia) Destanee Aiava (Australia) Petra Hule |
| October 21 | Challenger de Saguenay; Saguenay, Canada; Hard (i); W75+H; Singles - Doubles | (Croatia) Petra Marčinko; 6–3, 4–6, 7–6^{(7–3)} | (Netherlands) Anouk Koevermans | (Slovakia) Viktória Hrunčáková (Sweden) Kajsa Rinaldo Persson | (Canada) Stacey Fung (Canada) Nadia Lagaev (Canada) Cadence Brace (Canada) Kayla Cross |
| October 21 | Challenger de Saguenay; Saguenay, Canada; Hard (i); W75+H; Singles - Doubles | (United States) Dalayna Hewitt (United States) Anna Rogers; 6–1, 7–5 | (Belgium) Magali Kempen (Belgium) Lara Salden | (Slovakia) Viktória Hrunčáková (Sweden) Kajsa Rinaldo Persson | (Canada) Stacey Fung (Canada) Nadia Lagaev (Canada) Cadence Brace (Canada) Kayla Cross |
| October 21 | Internationaux Féminins de la Vienne; Poitiers, France; Hard (i); W75; Singles and doubles draws | (France) Léolia Jeanjean; 6–2, 6–3 | (France) Diana Martynov | (France) Émeline Dartron (Switzerland) Céline Naef | (Germany) Anna-Lena Friedsam (France) Margaux Rouvroy (Turkey) İpek Öz; Julia Avdeeva |
| October 21 | Internationaux Féminins de la Vienne; Poitiers, France; Hard (i); W75; Singles and doubles draws | (Germany) Anna-Lena Friedsam (Switzerland) Céline Naef; 6–4, 6–1 | (Poland) Martyna Kubka (Switzerland) Conny Perrin | (France) Émeline Dartron (Switzerland) Céline Naef | (Germany) Anna-Lena Friedsam (France) Margaux Rouvroy (Turkey) İpek Öz; Julia Avdeeva |
| October 21 | GB Pro-Series Glasgow; Glasgow, United Kingdom; Hard (i); W75; Singles and doubles draws | (Switzerland) Simona Waltert; 6–4, 6–2 | (Georgia (country)) Mariam Bolkvadze | (United Kingdom) Amarni Banks (United Kingdom) Jodie Burrage | (Czech Republic) Dominika Šalková (United Kingdom) Amelia Rajecki (Switzerland) Valentina Ryser (Estonia) Elena Malõgina |
| October 21 | GB Pro-Series Glasgow; Glasgow, United Kingdom; Hard (i); W75; Singles and doubles draws | (United Kingdom) Jodie Burrage (United Kingdom) Freya Christie; 6–4, 3–6, [10–5] | (Georgia (country)) Mariam Bolkvadze (Netherlands) Isabelle Haverlag | (United Kingdom) Amarni Banks (United Kingdom) Jodie Burrage | (Czech Republic) Dominika Šalková (United Kingdom) Amelia Rajecki (Switzerland) Valentina Ryser (Estonia) Elena Malõgina |
| October 21 | Qiandaohu, China; Hard; W35; Singles and doubles draws | (China) Guo Hanyu; 6–2, 6–2 | (China) Wang Meiling | Sofya Lansere; Evialina Laskevich | (China) Zhang Ying (China) Lu Jingjing (China) Zheng Wushuang; Kristiana Sidorova |
| October 21 | Qiandaohu, China; Hard; W35; Singles and doubles draws | Sofya Lansere; Ekaterina Shalimova; 4–6, 6–4, [10–5] | (China) Xun Fangying (China) Zhang Ying | Sofya Lansere; Evialina Laskevich | (China) Zhang Ying (China) Lu Jingjing (China) Zheng Wushuang; Kristiana Sidorova |
| October 21 | Heraklion, Greece; Clay; W35; Singles and doubles draws | Ekaterina Makarova; 4–6, 6–3, 6–3 | (Romania) Cristina Dinu | (Ukraine) Oleksandra Oliynykova (Romania) Ilinca Amariei | (Romania) Bianca Elena Bărbulescu (Serbia) Natalija Senić (Belgium) Romane Longueville (Romania) Irina Bara |
| October 21 | Heraklion, Greece; Clay; W35; Singles and doubles draws | (Romania) Ilinca Amariei (Greece) Elena Korokozidi; 6–3, 6–3 | Polina Leykina; Elina Nepliy | (Ukraine) Oleksandra Oliynykova (Romania) Ilinca Amariei | (Romania) Bianca Elena Bărbulescu (Serbia) Natalija Senić (Belgium) Romane Longueville (Romania) Irina Bara |
| October 21 | Santa Margherita di Pula, Italy; Clay; W35; Singles and doubles draws | (Spain) Carlota Martínez Círez; 6–4, 6–3 | (Italy) Nicole Fossa Huergo | (Bulgaria) Rositsa Dencheva (Italy) Camilla Zanolini | (Italy) Federica Urgesi (Greece) Sapfo Sakellaridi (Hungary) Amarissa Tóth (Italy) Samira De Stefano |
| October 21 | Santa Margherita di Pula, Italy; Clay; W35; Singles and doubles draws | (Greece) Sapfo Sakellaridi (Sweden) Lisa Zaar; 6–3, 6–4 | (Romania) Andreea Prisăcariu (Italy) Federica Urgesi | (Bulgaria) Rositsa Dencheva (Italy) Camilla Zanolini | (Italy) Federica Urgesi (Greece) Sapfo Sakellaridi (Hungary) Amarissa Tóth (Italy) Samira De Stefano |
| October 21 | Loulé, Portugal; Hard; W35; Singles and doubles draws | (Switzerland) Leonie Küng; 6–2, 6–1 | (Spain) Irene Burillo Escorihuela | (Netherlands) Stephanie Visscher (France) Yasmine Mansouri | (Georgia (country)) Sofia Shapatava (Poland) Weronika Falkowska (Serbia) Mia Ristić (Denmark) Johanne Svendsen |
| October 21 | Loulé, Portugal; Hard; W35; Singles and doubles draws | (Japan) Michika Ozeki (Netherlands) Lian Tran; 6–4, 6–2 | (Slovakia) Salma Drugdová (Luxembourg) Marie Weckerle | (Netherlands) Stephanie Visscher (France) Yasmine Mansouri | (Georgia (country)) Sofia Shapatava (Poland) Weronika Falkowska (Serbia) Mia Ristić (Denmark) Johanne Svendsen |
| October 21 | Kayseri, Turkey; Hard; W35; Singles and doubles draws | (Chinese Taipei) Joanna Garland; 6–1, 7–6^{(7–1)} | (Turkey) Çağla Büyükakçay | Jana Kolodynska; Daria Egorova | Aliona Falei (India) Ankita Raina (Lithuania) Klaudija Bubelytė (Slovenia) Dalila Jakupović |
| October 21 | Kayseri, Turkey; Hard; W35; Singles and doubles draws | (United States) Isabella Barrera Aguirre (United States) Abigail Rencheli; 6–3, 2–6, [10–6] | (Slovenia) Dalila Jakupović (India) Ankita Raina | Jana Kolodynska; Daria Egorova | Aliona Falei (India) Ankita Raina (Lithuania) Klaudija Bubelytė (Slovenia) Dalila Jakupović |
| October 21 | Hilton Head Island, United States; Hard; W35; Singles and doubles draws | (Ukraine) Anastasiya Lopata; 6–3, 6–2 | (United States) Elvina Kalieva | (Poland) Olivia Lincer (United States) Kylie McKenzie | (United States) Eryn Cayetano (Switzerland) Jenny Dürst (United States) Allie Kiick (United States) Karina Miller |
| October 21 | Hilton Head Island, United States; Hard; W35; Singles and doubles draws | (United States) Fiona Crawley (United States) Makenna Jones; 6–2, 6–7^{(5–7)}, [10–7] | (Kenya) Angella Okutoyi (Egypt) Merna Refaat | (Poland) Olivia Lincer (United States) Kylie McKenzie | (United States) Eryn Cayetano (Switzerland) Jenny Dürst (United States) Allie Kiick (United States) Karina Miller |
| October 21 | Trelew, Argentina; Hard (i); W15; Singles and doubles draws | (Argentina) Victoria Bosio; 6–1, 6–0 | (Brazil) Sofia Mendonça | (Peru) Michela Castro Zunino (Brazil) Jennifer Dourado | (Ecuador) Camila Romero (Argentina) Luciana Moyano (Argentina) Lourdes Ayala (Argentina) Sofia Meabe |
| October 21 | Trelew, Argentina; Hard (i); W15; Singles and doubles draws | (Argentina) Luciana Moyano (Ecuador) Camila Romero; 7–6^{(7–4)}, 6–3 | (Argentina) Victoria Bosio (Mexico) Marian Gómez Pezuela Cano | (Peru) Michela Castro Zunino (Brazil) Jennifer Dourado | (Ecuador) Camila Romero (Argentina) Luciana Moyano (Argentina) Lourdes Ayala (Argentina) Sofia Meabe |
| October 21 | Bol, Croatia; Clay; W15; Singles and doubles draws | (Czech Republic) Nikola Břečková; 6–4, 7–6^{(7–4)} | (Romania) Arina Gabriela Vasilescu | (Slovenia) Živa Falkner (Czech Republic) Sarah Melany Fajmonova | (United Kingdom) Isabelle Cherny (Germany) Chantal Sauvant (Italy) Francesca Pace (Czech Republic) Lucie Urbanová |
| October 21 | Bol, Croatia; Clay; W15; Singles and doubles draws | (Slovakia) Laura Svatíková (Romania) Arina Gabriela Vasilescu; 6–0, 7–6^{(7–3)} | (Germany) Laura Boehner (Italy) Francesca Pace | (Slovenia) Živa Falkner (Czech Republic) Sarah Melany Fajmonova | (United Kingdom) Isabelle Cherny (Germany) Chantal Sauvant (Italy) Francesca Pace (Czech Republic) Lucie Urbanová |
| October 21 | Sharm El Sheikh, Egypt; Hard; W15; Singles and doubles draws | (Poland) Zuzanna Pawlikowska; 7–5, 6–7^{(3–7)}, 7–5 | (Egypt) Sandra Samir | Evgeniya Burdina (Egypt) Lamis Alhussein Abdel Aziz | (Kazakhstan) Aruzhan Sagandikova (Romania) Alexandra Iordache (Serbia) Mirjana Jovanović (Italy) Carola Cavelli |
| October 21 | Sharm El Sheikh, Egypt; Hard; W15; Singles and doubles draws | Alisa Kummel; Ekaterina Makarova; 6–2, 6–4 | (Egypt) Yasmin Ezzat (Poland) Zuzanna Pawlikowska | Evgeniya Burdina (Egypt) Lamis Alhussein Abdel Aziz | (Kazakhstan) Aruzhan Sagandikova (Romania) Alexandra Iordache (Serbia) Mirjana Jovanović (Italy) Carola Cavelli |
| October 21 | Huamantla, Mexico; Hard; W15; Singles and doubles draws | (United States) Malaika Rapolu; 7–6^{(7–3)}, 6–2 | (Colombia) Yuliana Monroy | (Spain) Isabel Adrover Gallego (United States) Ema Burgić | (United States) Kaede Usui (Mexico) Amanda Carolina Nava Elkin (United States) Sabastiani León (Slovenia) Lara Smejkal |
| October 21 | Huamantla, Mexico; Hard; W15; Singles and doubles draws | (United States) Ema Burgić (United States) Sabastiani León; 3–6, 6–2, [10–6] | (Mexico) Claudia Sofía Martínez Solís (Mexico) María Fernanda Navarro Oliva | (Spain) Isabel Adrover Gallego (United States) Ema Burgić | (United States) Kaede Usui (Mexico) Amanda Carolina Nava Elkin (United States) Sabastiani León (Slovenia) Lara Smejkal |
| October 21 | Villena, Spain; Hard; W15; Singles and doubles draws | (Netherlands) Joy De Zeeuw; 7–6^{(9–7)}, 6–3 | (Hungary) Adrienn Nagy | (Bulgaria) Elizara Yaneva (Netherlands) Isis Louise Van den Broek | (Spain) Alba Rey García (Israel) Mika Buchnik (Spain) Judith Perelló Saavedra (Switzerland) Paula Cembranos |
| October 21 | Villena, Spain; Hard; W15; Singles and doubles draws | (Netherlands) Joy De Zeeuw (Hungary) Adrienn Nagy; Walkover | (Netherlands) Rose Marie Nijkamp (Netherlands) Isis Louise Van den Broek | (Bulgaria) Elizara Yaneva (Netherlands) Isis Louise Van den Broek | (Spain) Alba Rey García (Israel) Mika Buchnik (Spain) Judith Perelló Saavedra (Switzerland) Paula Cembranos |
| October 21 | Monastir, Tunisia; Hard; W15; Singles and doubles draws | (Ukraine) Daria Yesypchuk; 6–0, 6–1 | (France) Laïa Petretic | (United Kingdom) Esther Adeshina (United States) Lilian Poling | (France) Nina Radovanovic (Belgium) Kaat Coppez (Italy) Noemi Maines (Germany) Josy Daems |
| October 21 | Monastir, Tunisia; Hard; W15; Singles and doubles draws | (United States) Julia Adams (United Kingdom) Esther Adeshina; 6–0, 7–5 | (Germany) Luisa Meyer auf der Heide (Germany) Anja Wildgruber | (United Kingdom) Esther Adeshina (United States) Lilian Poling | (France) Nina Radovanovic (Belgium) Kaat Coppez (Italy) Noemi Maines (Germany) Josy Daems |
| October 28 | NSW Open; Sydney, Australia; Hard; W75; Singles - Doubles | (Australia) Emerson Jones; 6–4, 7–6^{(7–3)} | (Australia) Taylah Preston | (Australia) Talia Gibson (Japan) Hikaru Sato | (Australia) Petra Hule (Australia) Gabriella Da Silva-Fick (Slovakia) Nina Vargová (Japan) Erika Sema |
| October 28 | NSW Open; Sydney, Australia; Hard; W75; Singles - Doubles | (Australia) Lizette Cabrera (Australia) Taylah Preston; 6–1, 3–6, [10–8] | (Australia) Destanee Aiava (Australia) Maddison Inglis | (Australia) Talia Gibson (Japan) Hikaru Sato | (Australia) Petra Hule (Australia) Gabriella Da Silva-Fick (Slovakia) Nina Vargová (Japan) Erika Sema |
| October 28 | Tevlin Women's Challenger; Toronto, Canada; Hard (i); W75; Singles - Doubles | (United States) Louisa Chirico; 7–6^{(7–5)}, 6–3 | (Canada) Kayla Cross | (France) Julie Belgraver (Slovakia) Viktória Hrunčáková | (Romania) Gabriela Lee (United States) Madison Sieg (Canada) Katherine Sebov (Japan) Haruka Kaji |
| October 28 | Tevlin Women's Challenger; Toronto, Canada; Hard (i); W75; Singles - Doubles | (United States) Jamie Loeb (Lithuania) Justina Mikulskytė; 6–2, 6–1 | (France) Julie Belgraver (Netherlands) Jasmijn Gimbrère | (France) Julie Belgraver (Slovakia) Viktória Hrunčáková | (Romania) Gabriela Lee (United States) Madison Sieg (Canada) Katherine Sebov (Japan) Haruka Kaji |
| October 28 | Hamburg Ladies Cup; Hamburg, Germany; Hard (i); W75; Singles - Doubles | (Germany) Mona Barthel; 6–4, 7–6^{(8–6)} | (United Kingdom) Sonay Kartal | (Finland) Anastasia Kulikova (Czech Republic) Barbora Palicová | (Austria) Sinja Kraus (Spain) Kaitlin Quevedo (Czech Republic) Dominika Šalková (United States) Vivian Wolff |
| October 28 | Hamburg Ladies Cup; Hamburg, Germany; Hard (i); W75; Singles - Doubles | (United Kingdom) Madeleine Brooks (Netherlands) Isabelle Haverlag; 6–3, 6–2 | (India) Riya Bhatia (Netherlands) Lian Tran | (Finland) Anastasia Kulikova (Czech Republic) Barbora Palicová | (Austria) Sinja Kraus (Spain) Kaitlin Quevedo (Czech Republic) Dominika Šalková (United States) Vivian Wolff |
| October 28 | Open Nantes Atlantique; Nantes, France; Hard (i); W50; Singles and doubles draws | (France) Léolia Jeanjean; 6–1, 6–3 | (France) Sara Cakarevic | (Switzerland) Céline Naef (Cyprus) Raluka Șerban | (France) Émeline Dartron (France) Carole Monnet (Italy) Camilla Rosatello (Croatia) Lea Bošković |
| October 28 | Open Nantes Atlantique; Nantes, France; Hard (i); W50; Singles and doubles draws | (United States) Tyra Caterina Grant (Italy) Camilla Rosatello; 6–2, 6–1 | (Latvia) Diāna Marcinkēviča (Burundi) Sada Nahimana | (Switzerland) Céline Naef (Cyprus) Raluka Șerban | (France) Émeline Dartron (France) Carole Monnet (Italy) Camilla Rosatello (Croatia) Lea Bošković |
| October 28 | Makinohara, Japan; Carpet; W35; Singles and doubles draws | (Japan) Ayano Shimizu; 3–6, 6–3, 6–4 | (Japan) Miho Kuramochi | (Japan) Hiromi Abe (South Korea) Back Da-yeon | (Japan) Shiho Akita (Japan) Sae Noguchi (Japan) Kanako Morisaki (Japan) Eri Shimizu |
| October 28 | Makinohara, Japan; Carpet; W35; Singles and doubles draws | (Japan) Kanako Morisaki (Japan) Eri Shimizu; 6–2, 6–1 | (South Korea) Jeong Bo-young (Japan) Ayumi Miyamoto | (Japan) Hiromi Abe (South Korea) Back Da-yeon | (Japan) Shiho Akita (Japan) Sae Noguchi (Japan) Kanako Morisaki (Japan) Eri Shimizu |
| October 28 | Istanbul, Turkey; Hard (i); W35; Singles and doubles draws | (Romania) Patricia Maria Țig; 6–3, 7–6^{(7–4)} | (Turkey) Ayla Aksu | Aliona Falei (Georgia (country)) Mariam Bolkvadze | Ksenia Laskutova; Anastasia Gasanova; Mariia Tkacheva (Romania) Andreea Prisăcariu |
| October 28 | Istanbul, Turkey; Hard (i); W35; Singles and doubles draws | (Latvia) Kamilla Bartone (Romania) Andreea Prisăcariu; 6–4, 6–2 | (Sweden) Jacqueline Cabaj Awad (Croatia) Iva Primorac | Aliona Falei (Georgia (country)) Mariam Bolkvadze | Ksenia Laskutova; Anastasia Gasanova; Mariia Tkacheva (Romania) Andreea Prisăcariu |
| October 28 | GB Pro-Series Loughborough; Loughborough, United Kingdom; Hard (i); W35; Singles and doubles draws | (Switzerland) Susan Bandecchi; 6–4, 3–6, 6–1 | (United Kingdom) Ranah Stoiber | (United Kingdom) Ella McDonald (United Kingdom) Amelia Rajecki | (United Kingdom) Katherine Barnes (Slovakia) Katarína Strešnáková (United Kingdom) Freya Christie (Greece) Valentini Grammatikopoulou |
| October 28 | GB Pro-Series Loughborough; Loughborough, United Kingdom; Hard (i); W35; Singles and doubles draws | (Greece) Valentini Grammatikopoulou (Estonia) Elena Malõgina; Walkover | (United Kingdom) Ella McDonald (United Kingdom) Ranah Stoiber | (United Kingdom) Ella McDonald (United Kingdom) Amelia Rajecki | (United Kingdom) Katherine Barnes (Slovakia) Katarína Strešnáková (United Kingdom) Freya Christie (Greece) Valentini Grammatikopoulou |
| October 28 | Norman, United States; Hard (i); W35; Singles and doubles draws | (United States) Anna Rogers; 6–4, 6–3 | Kira Matushkina | (Poland) Olivia Lincer (South Korea) Park So-hyun | (United Kingdom) Kristina Paskauskas (United States) Maribella Zamarripa (United States) Jessica Failla (Brazil) Thaísa Grana Pedretti |
| October 28 | Norman, United States; Hard (i); W35; Singles and doubles draws | (United States) Jessica Failla (United States) Maribella Zamarripa; 3–6, 6–2, [10–5] | (United States) Makenna Jones (South Korea) Park So-hyun | (Poland) Olivia Lincer (South Korea) Park So-hyun | (United Kingdom) Kristina Paskauskas (United States) Maribella Zamarripa (United States) Jessica Failla (Brazil) Thaísa Grana Pedretti |
| October 28 | Sharm El Sheikh, Egypt; Hard; W15; Singles and doubles draws | (Slovakia) Katarína Kužmová; 0–6, 6–4, 6–4 | (South Korea) Lee Eun-hye | (Egypt) Lamis Alhussein Abdel Aziz (Egypt) Sandra Samir | (Egypt) Yasmin Ezzat; Evgeniya Burdina (Kazakhstan) Aruzhan Sagandikova (United States) Dasha Ivanova |
| October 28 | Sharm El Sheikh, Egypt; Hard; W15; Singles and doubles draws | (South Korea) Kim Yu-jin (South Korea) Lee Eun-hye; 4–6, 6–3, [11–9] | (Egypt) Yasmin Ezzat (Slovakia) Katarína Kužmová | (Egypt) Lamis Alhussein Abdel Aziz (Egypt) Sandra Samir | (Egypt) Yasmin Ezzat; Evgeniya Burdina (Kazakhstan) Aruzhan Sagandikova (United States) Dasha Ivanova |
| October 28 | Heraklion, Greece; Clay; W15; Singles and doubles draws | (Morocco) Yasmine Kabbaj; 6–3, 7–6^{(8–6)} | (Lithuania) Klaudija Bubelytė | (Germany) Eva Marie Voracek (Romania) Ilinca Amariei | (Greece) Elena Korokozidi (Czech Republic) Ivana Šebestová (Germany) Marie Vogt (Finland) Laura Hietaranta |
| October 28 | Heraklion, Greece; Clay; W15; Singles and doubles draws | (Romania) Ilinca Amariei (Greece) Elena Korokozidi; 3–6, 6–3, [11–9] | (Greece) Eleni Chatziavraam (Greece) Sapfo Sakellaridi | (Germany) Eva Marie Voracek (Romania) Ilinca Amariei | (Greece) Elena Korokozidi (Czech Republic) Ivana Šebestová (Germany) Marie Vogt (Finland) Laura Hietaranta |
| October 28 | Luque, Paraguay; Clay; W15; Singles and doubles draws | (Argentina) Candela Vázquez; 2–6, 6–2, 6–4 | (Brazil) Camilla Bossi | (Argentina) Justina Maria Gonzalez Daniele (Argentina) Victoria Bosio | (Brazil) Ana Candiotto (Argentina) Luciana Moyano (Peru) Romina Ccuno (Germany) Luisa Hrda |
| October 28 | Luque, Paraguay; Clay; W15; Singles and doubles draws | (Brazil) Camilla Bossi (Brazil) Ana Candiotto; 6–4, 5–7, [10–7] | (Argentina) Luciana Moyano (Ecuador) Camila Romero | (Argentina) Justina Maria Gonzalez Daniele (Argentina) Victoria Bosio | (Brazil) Ana Candiotto (Argentina) Luciana Moyano (Peru) Romina Ccuno (Germany) Luisa Hrda |
| October 28 | Täby, Sweden; Hard (i); W15; Singles and doubles draws | (Sweden) Lisa Zaar; 3–6, 6–1, 6–4 | (Netherlands) Stéphanie Visscher | (United Kingdom) Holly Hutchinson (Sweden) Lea Nilsson | (Sweden) Nellie Taraba Wallberg (Latvia) Beatrise Zeltiņa (Finland) Ella Haavisto (Denmark) Rebecca Munk Mortensen |
| October 28 | Täby, Sweden; Hard (i); W15; Singles and doubles draws | (Netherlands) Stéphanie Visscher (Sweden) Lisa Zaar; 6–0, 7–5 | (Switzerland) Marie Mettraux (Ukraine) Daria Yesypchuk | (United Kingdom) Holly Hutchinson (Sweden) Lea Nilsson | (Sweden) Nellie Taraba Wallberg (Latvia) Beatrise Zeltiņa (Finland) Ella Haavisto (Denmark) Rebecca Munk Mortensen |
| October 28 | Monastir, Tunisia; Hard; W15; Singles and doubles draws | (France) Ksenia Efremova; 6–1, 7–5 | (France) Nina Radovanovic | (Germany) Luisa Meyer auf der Heide (France) Marie Villet | (France) Alyssa Réguer (Italy) Camilla Zanolini (Germany) Anja Wildgruber (Bulgaria) Iva Ivanova |
| October 28 | Monastir, Tunisia; Hard; W15; Singles and doubles draws | (Germany) Luisa Meyer auf der Heide (Bulgaria) Julia Stamatova; 6–4, 7–6^{(7–5)} | (Latvia) Valērija Maija Kargina (Germany) Luise Reisel | (Germany) Luisa Meyer auf der Heide (France) Marie Villet | (France) Alyssa Réguer (Italy) Camilla Zanolini (Germany) Anja Wildgruber (Bulgaria) Iva Ivanova |
| October 28 | Kayseri, Turkey; Hard; W15; Singles and doubles draws | Edda Mamedova; 6–3, 6–4 | Anna Snigireva | Varvara Panshina (Romania) Stefania Bojica | (Romania) Briana Szabó (Turkey) İlay Yörük (Ukraine) Mariia Bergen; Daria Shadchneva |
| October 28 | Kayseri, Turkey; Hard; W15; Singles and doubles draws | (Romania) Stefania Bojica (Romania) Briana Szabó; 6–4, 6–2 | Varvara Panshina (Uzbekistan) Daria Shubina | Varvara Panshina (Romania) Stefania Bojica | (Romania) Briana Szabó (Turkey) İlay Yörük (Ukraine) Mariia Bergen; Daria Shadchneva |

=== November ===
| Week of | Tournament | Winner | Runners-up | Semifinalists | Quarterfinalists |
|---|---|---|---|---|---|
| November 4 | Ismaning Open; Ismaning, Germany; Carpet (i); W75; Singles - Doubles | (Switzerland) Susan Bandecchi; 6–7^{(8–10)}, 6–2, 7–5 | (Ukraine) Daria Snigur | (Slovenia) Dalila Jakupović (Germany) Anna-Lena Friedsam | (Croatia) Lea Bošković (Germany) Carolina Kuhl (Czech Republic) Barbora Palicová (Germany) Mariella Thamm |
| November 4 | Ismaning Open; Ismaning, Germany; Carpet (i); W75; Singles - Doubles | (Czech Republic) Aneta Kučmová (Czech Republic) Aneta Laboutková; 4–6, 6–4, [10–7] | (Netherlands) Isabelle Haverlag (France) Carole Monnet | (Slovenia) Dalila Jakupović (Germany) Anna-Lena Friedsam | (Croatia) Lea Bošković (Germany) Carolina Kuhl (Czech Republic) Barbora Palicová (Germany) Mariella Thamm |
| November 4 | Kyotec Open; Pétange, Luxembourg; Hard (i); W75; Singles and doubles draws | (Switzerland) Céline Naef; 6–2, 6–4 | (France) Océane Dodin | Maria Timofeeva (Netherlands) Lian Tran | (Belgium) Marie Benoît (Switzerland) Belinda Bencic (Germany) Anna Gabric (Italy) Camilla Rosatello |
| November 4 | Kyotec Open; Pétange, Luxembourg; Hard (i); W75; Singles and doubles draws | Alevtina Ibragimova (Netherlands) Lian Tran; 1–6, 6–2, [11–9] | (Czech Republic) Jesika Malečková (Czech Republic) Miriam Škoch | Maria Timofeeva (Netherlands) Lian Tran | (Belgium) Marie Benoît (Switzerland) Belinda Bencic (Germany) Anna Gabric (Italy) Camilla Rosatello |
| November 4 | Veracruz, Mexico; Hard; W50; Singles and doubles draws | (Croatia) Antonia Ružić; 6–4, 7–6^{(7–3)} | Mariia Tkacheva | (Czech Republic) Laura Samson (Mexico) Ana Sofía Sánchez | (Netherlands) Eva Vedder (Canada) Dasha Plekhanova (Mexico) María Portillo Ramírez (Mexico) Victoria Rodríguez |
| November 4 | Veracruz, Mexico; Hard; W50; Singles and doubles draws | (United States) Hanna Chang (United States) Dalayna Hewitt; 6–4, 7–5 | (Mexico) Jéssica Hinojosa Gómez (Japan) Hiroko Kuwata | (Czech Republic) Laura Samson (Mexico) Ana Sofía Sánchez | (Netherlands) Eva Vedder (Canada) Dasha Plekhanova (Mexico) María Portillo Ramírez (Mexico) Victoria Rodríguez |
| November 4 | Villeneuve-d'Ascq, France; Hard (i); W35; Singles and doubles draws | (France) Émeline Dartron; 6–2, 5–7, 6–3 | (France) Tiantsoa Sarah Rakotomanga Rajaonah | (United Kingdom) Jodie Burrage (Belgium) Sofia Costoulas | (Romania) Patricia Maria Țig (France) Julie Gervais (Croatia) Iva Primorac (Belgium) Jana Otzipka |
| November 4 | Villeneuve-d'Ascq, France; Hard (i); W35; Singles and doubles draws | (Cyprus) Daria Frayman (France) Marie Mattel; 6–7^{(5–7)}, 6–2, [10–8] | (Netherlands) Danique Havermans (Belgium) Jana Otzipka | (United Kingdom) Jodie Burrage (Belgium) Sofia Costoulas | (Romania) Patricia Maria Țig (France) Julie Gervais (Croatia) Iva Primorac (Belgium) Jana Otzipka |
| November 4 | Hamamatsu, Japan; Carpet; W35; Singles and doubles draws | (Japan) Mei Yamaguchi; 4–6, 5–3 ret. | (Japan) Aoi Ito | (Japan) Haruna Arakawa (Japan) Ayano Shimizu | (South Korea) Back Da-yeon (Japan) Eri Shimizu (Japan) Saki Imamura (Japan) Rea Nakashima |
| November 4 | Hamamatsu, Japan; Carpet; W35; Singles and doubles draws | (Japan) Hiromi Abe (Japan) Akiko Omae; 6–0, 6–0 | (Japan) Momoko Kobori (Japan) Ayano Shimizu | (Japan) Haruna Arakawa (Japan) Ayano Shimizu | (South Korea) Back Da-yeon (Japan) Eri Shimizu (Japan) Saki Imamura (Japan) Rea Nakashima |
| November 4 | Solarino, Italy; Carpet; W35; Singles and doubles draws | (Chinese Taipei) Joanna Garland; 5–7, 6–2, 6–3 | (Greece) Valentini Grammatikopoulou | (Slovakia) Katarína Kužmová (Italy) Samira De Stefano | (Italy) Giorgia Pedone (Italy) Camilla Gennaro (Switzerland) Ylena In-Albon (India) Riya Bhatia |
| November 4 | Solarino, Italy; Carpet; W35; Singles and doubles draws | (Greece) Valentini Grammatikopoulou (Slovakia) Katarína Kužmová; 6–3, 6–3 | Ksenia Laskutova (Italy) Federica Urgesi | (Slovakia) Katarína Kužmová (Italy) Samira De Stefano | (Italy) Giorgia Pedone (Italy) Camilla Gennaro (Switzerland) Ylena In-Albon (India) Riya Bhatia |
| November 4 | Miami, United States; Hard; W35; Singles and doubles draws | (Czech Republic) Darja Viďmanová; 4–6, 6–4, 6–1 | (Japan) Mayu Crossley | (United States) Lea Ma (United States) Anna Rogers | (Poland) Olivia Lincer (United States) Lexington Reed (Brazil) Thaísa Grana Pedretti (United States) Allie Kiick |
| November 4 | Miami, United States; Hard; W35; Singles and doubles draws | (Canada) Kayla Cross (United States) Anna Rogers; 7–5, 6–4 | (Morocco) Aya El Aouni (Poland) Olivia Lincer | (United States) Lea Ma (United States) Anna Rogers | (Poland) Olivia Lincer (United States) Lexington Reed (Brazil) Thaísa Grana Pedretti (United States) Allie Kiick |
| November 4 | Sharm El Sheikh, Egypt; Hard; W15; Singles and doubles draws | Maria Golovina; 7–5, 6–2 | (South Korea) Lee Eun-hye | Aleksandra Pozarenko (Germany) Kathleen Kanev | (Finland) Clarissa Blomqvist; Nina Rudiukova (Netherlands) Coco Bosman; Valeriia Artemeva |
| November 4 | Sharm El Sheikh, Egypt; Hard; W15; Singles and doubles draws | Maria Golovina; Daria Shadchneva; 7–5, 6–1 | Evgeniya Burdina; Nina Rudiukova | Aleksandra Pozarenko (Germany) Kathleen Kanev | (Finland) Clarissa Blomqvist; Nina Rudiukova (Netherlands) Coco Bosman; Valeriia Artemeva |
| November 4 | Heraklion, Greece; Clay; W15; Singles and doubles draws | (Lithuania) Klaudija Bubelytė; 6–2, 6–2 | (Romania) Ilinca Amariei | (Slovakia) Laura Svatíková; Polina Leykina | (Greece) Sapfo Sakellaridi (Czech Republic) Ivana Šebestová (Romania) Mara Gae (Romania) Bianca Elena Bărbulescu |
| November 4 | Heraklion, Greece; Clay; W15; Singles and doubles draws | (Greece) Eleni Christofi (Greece) Sapfo Sakellaridi; Walkover | (Norway) Astrid Wanja Brune Olsen (Germany) Franziska Sziedat | (Slovakia) Laura Svatíková; Polina Leykina | (Greece) Sapfo Sakellaridi (Czech Republic) Ivana Šebestová (Romania) Mara Gae (Romania) Bianca Elena Bărbulescu |
| November 4 | Asunción, Paraguay; Clay; W15; Singles and doubles draws | (Argentina) Candela Vazquez; 6–2, 6–3 | (Argentina) Berta Bonardi | (Chile) Antonia Vergara Rivera (Brazil) Ana Candiotto | (Chile) Fernanda Labraña (Argentina) Victoria Bosio (Ecuador) Camila Romero (Brazil) Júlia Konishi Camargo Silva |
| November 4 | Asunción, Paraguay; Clay; W15; Singles and doubles draws | (Argentina) Luciana Moyano (Ecuador) Camila Romero; 6–4, 6–7^{(5–7)}, [11–9] | (Argentina) Berta Bonardi (Chile) Antonia Vergara Rivera | (Chile) Antonia Vergara Rivera (Brazil) Ana Candiotto | (Chile) Fernanda Labraña (Argentina) Victoria Bosio (Ecuador) Camila Romero (Brazil) Júlia Konishi Camargo Silva |
| November 4 | Antalya, Turkey; Clay; W15; Singles and doubles draws | (Hungary) Amarissa Tóth; 6–4, 2–0 ret. | (Romania) Ștefania Bojică | (Turkey) İlay Yörük; Valeriya Yushchenko | (Romania) Eva Maria Ionescu (France) Alizé Lim (Hungary) Luca Udvardy (Finland) Laura Hietaranta |
| November 4 | Antalya, Turkey; Clay; W15; Singles and doubles draws | (Romania) Ștefania Bojică (Romania) Anastasia Safta; 7–6^{(7–3)}, 6–3 | (Hungary) Adrienn Nagy (Czech Republic) Linda Ševčíková | (Turkey) İlay Yörük; Valeriya Yushchenko | (Romania) Eva Maria Ionescu (France) Alizé Lim (Hungary) Luca Udvardy (Finland) Laura Hietaranta |
| November 4 | Lincoln, United States; Hard (i); W15; Singles and doubles draws | (United States) Savannah Broadus; 6–3, 4–6, 7–5 | (United States) Rachel Gailis | (China) Han Jiangxue (United States) Delaney Jade Bennett | (United States) Amy Zhu (Egypt) Merna Refaat; Kristina Liutova (Kenya) Angella Okutoyi |
| November 4 | Lincoln, United States; Hard (i); W15; Singles and doubles draws | (United States) Savannah Broadus (United States) Carolyn Campana; 4–6, 6–3, [10–2] | (Kenya) Angella Okutoyi (Egypt) Merna Refaat | (China) Han Jiangxue (United States) Delaney Jade Bennett | (United States) Amy Zhu (Egypt) Merna Refaat; Kristina Liutova (Kenya) Angella Okutoyi |
| November 4 | Monastir, Tunisia; Hard; W15; Singles and doubles draws | Victoria Milovanova; 6–2, 6–2 | (Germany) Luisa Meyer auf der Heide | (Italy) Anastasia Bertacchi (United States) Julia Adams | (Latvia) Marija Semeņistaja; Alana Tuayeva (Austria) Liel Rothensteiner (Bulgaria) Iva Ivanova |
| November 4 | Monastir, Tunisia; Hard; W15; Singles and doubles draws | (Netherlands) Madelief Hageman (Lithuania) Andrė Lukošiūtė; 4–6, 6–0, [10–5] | (Slovenia) Ela Nala Milić (Italy) Anna Turati | (Italy) Anastasia Bertacchi (United States) Julia Adams | (Latvia) Marija Semeņistaja; Alana Tuayeva (Austria) Liel Rothensteiner (Bulgaria) Iva Ivanova |
| November 11 | Brisbane QTC Tennis International; Brisbane, Australia; Hard; W50; Singles and doubles draws | (Australia) Destanee Aiava; 7–6^{(7–4)}, 4–6, 6–3 | (Australia) Lizette Cabrera | (China) Lu Jiajing (Australia) Petra Hule | (India) Vaidehi Chaudhari (Japan) Kyōka Okamura (Japan) Funa Kozaki (Australia) Taylah Preston |
| November 11 | Brisbane QTC Tennis International; Brisbane, Australia; Hard; W50; Singles and doubles draws | (Australia) Destanee Aiava (Australia) Maddison Inglis; 6–3, 6–4 | (Japan) Yuki Naito (India) Ankita Raina | (China) Lu Jiajing (Australia) Petra Hule | (India) Vaidehi Chaudhari (Japan) Kyōka Okamura (Japan) Funa Kozaki (Australia) Taylah Preston |
| November 11 | Chihuahua City, Mexico; Hard; W50; Singles and doubles draws | Mariia Tkacheva; 6–1, 6–3 | Daria Kudashova | (Canada) Stacey Fung (United States) Maria Mateas | (United States) Hanna Chang (Czech Republic) Laura Samson (Greece) Despina Papamichail (Mexico) Ana Sofía Sánchez |
| November 11 | Chihuahua City, Mexico; Hard; W50; Singles and doubles draws | (United States) Haley Giavara (United States) Dalayna Hewitt; 6–1, 6–3 | (Czech Republic) Laura Samson (Mexico) Ana Sofía Sánchez | (Canada) Stacey Fung (United States) Maria Mateas | (United States) Hanna Chang (Czech Republic) Laura Samson (Greece) Despina Papamichail (Mexico) Ana Sofía Sánchez |
| November 11 | Funchal, Portugal; Hard; W50; Singles and doubles draws | Kristina Dmitruk; 6–1, 3–2 ret. | (Malta) Francesca Curmi | (United Kingdom) Jodie Burrage; Polina Iatcenko | (Ukraine) Daria Snigur (Czech Republic) Aneta Laboutková (Netherlands) Anouck Vrancken Peeters (Portugal) Matilde Jorge |
| November 11 | Funchal, Portugal; Hard; W50; Singles and doubles draws | (United Kingdom) Holly Hutchinson (United Kingdom) Ella McDonald; 3–6, 6–2, [10–8] | (India) Riya Bhatia; Polina Iatcenko | (United Kingdom) Jodie Burrage; Polina Iatcenko | (Ukraine) Daria Snigur (Czech Republic) Aneta Laboutková (Netherlands) Anouck Vrancken Peeters (Portugal) Matilde Jorge |
| November 11 | Austin, United States; Hard; W50; Singles and doubles draws | (United States) Malaika Rapolu; 6–4, 6–2 | (United States) Karina Miller | (Japan) Haruka Kaji (United States) Whitney Osuigwe | (United States) Sophie Chang (Japan) Rinon Okuwaki (Canada) Carol Zhao (Australia) Jaimee Fourlis |
| November 11 | Austin, United States; Hard; W50; Singles and doubles draws | (Morocco) Diae El Jardi (Brazil) Thaísa Grana Pedretti; 6–2, 4–6, [14–12] | (United States) Whitney Osuigwe (United States) Alana Smith | (Japan) Haruka Kaji (United States) Whitney Osuigwe | (United States) Sophie Chang (Japan) Rinon Okuwaki (Canada) Carol Zhao (Australia) Jaimee Fourlis |
| November 11 | Solarino, Italy; Carpet; W35; Singles and doubles draws | (Chinese Taipei) Joanna Garland; 6–2, 6–3 | (Italy) Giorgia Pedone | (Italy) Noemi Basiletti (Italy) Samira De Stefano | (Ukraine) Daria Yesypchuk (Italy) Silvia Ambrosio (Slovenia) Dalila Jakupović (Italy) Diletta Cherubini |
| November 11 | Solarino, Italy; Carpet; W35; Singles and doubles draws | (Italy) Silvia Ambrosio (Italy) Sofia Rocchetti; 6–1, 6–3 | (Italy) Giulia Alessia Monteleone (Poland) Oliwia Szymczuch | (Italy) Noemi Basiletti (Italy) Samira De Stefano | (Ukraine) Daria Yesypchuk (Italy) Silvia Ambrosio (Slovenia) Dalila Jakupović (Italy) Diletta Cherubini |
| November 11 | Sharm El Sheikh, Egypt; Hard; W15; Singles and doubles draws | (South Korea) Lee Eun-hye; 6–1, 6–4 | (Kosovo) Arlinda Rushiti | (Germany) Kathleen Kanev (South Korea) Jang Ga-eul | Alisa Kummel (South Korea) Kim Yu-jin; Evgeniya Burdina; Polina Kuharenko |
| November 11 | Sharm El Sheikh, Egypt; Hard; W15; Singles and doubles draws | (Egypt) Yasmin Ezzat (Kosovo) Arlinda Rushiti; 7–6^{(8–6)}, 6–3 | (Serbia) Mirjana Jovanović (Uzbekistan) Diana Yakovleva | (Germany) Kathleen Kanev (South Korea) Jang Ga-eul | Alisa Kummel (South Korea) Kim Yu-jin; Evgeniya Burdina; Polina Kuharenko |
| November 11 | Heraklion, Greece; Clay; W15; Singles and doubles draws | (Romania) Ilinca Amariei; 3–6, 6–4, 6–4 | (Greece) Dimitra Pavlou | (Greece) Sapfo Sakellaridi; Anastasia Sukhotina | (Romania) Oana Georgeta Simion (Poland) Marcelina Podlińska (Italy) Gloria Ceschi (United Kingdom) Jizel Matos Sequeira Fernandes |
| November 11 | Heraklion, Greece; Clay; W15; Singles and doubles draws | (Greece) Dimitra Pavlou (Greece) Sapfo Sakellaridi; 2–1 ret. | (Belgium) Tilwith Di Girolami (Lithuania) Patricija Paukštytė | (Greece) Sapfo Sakellaridi; Anastasia Sukhotina | (Romania) Oana Georgeta Simion (Poland) Marcelina Podlińska (Italy) Gloria Ceschi (United Kingdom) Jizel Matos Sequeira Fernandes |
| November 11 | Nules, Spain; Clay; W15; Singles and doubles draws | (Romania) Lavinia Tănăsie; 7–6^{(7–3)}, 6–2 | (Spain) Ruth Roura Llaverias | (Germany) Mina Hodzic (Australia) Seone Mendez | (Spain) Noelia Bouzó Zanotti (Switzerland) Katerina Tsygourova (Germany) Joëlle Steur (Italy) Alessandra Mazzola |
| November 11 | Nules, Spain; Clay; W15; Singles and doubles draws | (Italy) Enola Chiesa (Australia) Seone Mendez; 6–2, 3–6, [10–4] | (Spain) Lorena Solar Donoso (Spain) Meritxell Teixidó García | (Germany) Mina Hodzic (Australia) Seone Mendez | (Spain) Noelia Bouzó Zanotti (Switzerland) Katerina Tsygourova (Germany) Joëlle Steur (Italy) Alessandra Mazzola |
| November 11 | Antalya, Turkey; Clay; W15; Singles and doubles draws | (Turkey) İlay Yörük; 7–6^{(7–4)}, 6–3 | (Spain) Sara Dols | (Germany) Chantal Sauvant; Valeriya Yushchenko | (Romania) Maria Sara Popa (Brazil) Victória Luiza Barros (Netherlands) Vanja Gudelj (Czech Republic) Linda Ševčíková |
| November 11 | Antalya, Turkey; Clay; W15; Singles and doubles draws | (Turkey) Deniz Dilek; Rada Zolotareva; 6–0, 6–2 | (United States) Baylen Brown (United States) Jamilah Snells | (Germany) Chantal Sauvant; Valeriya Yushchenko | (Romania) Maria Sara Popa (Brazil) Victória Luiza Barros (Netherlands) Vanja Gudelj (Czech Republic) Linda Ševčíková |
| November 11 | Clemson, United States; Hard; W15; Singles and doubles draws | (United States) Emma Charney; 7–6^{(7–5)}, 7–6^{(7–3)} | (United States) Sara Daavettila | (United Kingdom) Kristina Paskauskas (United States) Makenna Jones | Kristina Liutova (South Africa) Gabriella Broadfoot (United States) Sofia Camila Rojas (United Kingdom) Gabia Paskauskas |
| November 11 | Clemson, United States; Hard; W15; Singles and doubles draws | (United States) Sara Daavettila (United States) Makenna Jones; 6–0, 6–2 | (Poland) Olivia Bergler (France) Sophia Biolay | (United Kingdom) Kristina Paskauskas (United States) Makenna Jones | Kristina Liutova (South Africa) Gabriella Broadfoot (United States) Sofia Camila Rojas (United Kingdom) Gabia Paskauskas |
| November 11 | Monastir, Tunisia; Hard; W15; Singles and doubles draws | (Japan) Sakura Hosogi; 6–2, 6–0 | Arina Bulatova | (Germany) Josy Daems (United States) Julia Adams | (Italy) Federica Sacco (Slovenia) Ela Nala Milić (Ukraine) Yelyzaveta Chainykova (China) Hou Yanan |
| November 11 | Monastir, Tunisia; Hard; W15; Singles and doubles draws | (Germany) Mia Mack (Germany) Marie Vogt; 7–5, 6–4 | (United States) Julia Adams (United Kingdom) Esther Adeshina | (Germany) Josy Daems (United States) Julia Adams | (Italy) Federica Sacco (Slovenia) Ela Nala Milić (Ukraine) Yelyzaveta Chainykova (China) Hou Yanan |
| November 11 | Neuquén, Argentina; Clay; W15; Singles and doubles draws | (Argentina) Luisina Giovannini; 6–0, 6–1 | (Peru) Lucciana Pérez Alarcón | (Argentina) Julieta Estable (Chile) Fernanda Labraña | (Argentina) Sol Ailin Larraya Guidi (Argentina) Berta Bonardi (Mexico) Natalia Sousa Salazar (Argentina) María Florencia Urrutia |
| November 11 | Neuquén, Argentina; Clay; W15; Singles and doubles draws | (Argentina) Luisina Giovannini (Mexico) Marian Gómez Pezuela Cano; 6–3, 6–4 | (Chile) Fernanda Labraña (Peru) Lucciana Pérez Alarcón | (Argentina) Julieta Estable (Chile) Fernanda Labraña | (Argentina) Sol Ailin Larraya Guidi (Argentina) Berta Bonardi (Mexico) Natalia Sousa Salazar (Argentina) María Florencia Urrutia |
| November 18 | Takasaki Open; Takasaki, Japan; Hard; W100; Singles - Doubles | (Japan) Aoi Ito; 7–5, 6–4 | (China) Wei Sijia | (Indonesia) Priska Nugroho (Thailand) Mananchaya Sawangkaew | (Japan) Haruka Kaji (Chinese Taipei) Liang En-shuo (Philippines) Alex Eala (Japan) Sara Saito |
| November 18 | Takasaki Open; Takasaki, Japan; Hard; W100; Singles - Doubles | (Japan) Momoko Kobori (Japan) Ayano Shimizu; 4–6, 6–4, [10–3] | (Chinese Taipei) Liang En-shuo (Chinese Taipei) Tsao Chia-yi | (Indonesia) Priska Nugroho (Thailand) Mananchaya Sawangkaew | (Japan) Haruka Kaji (Chinese Taipei) Liang En-shuo (Philippines) Alex Eala (Japan) Sara Saito |
| November 18 | Caloundra, Australia; Hard; W50; Singles and doubles draws | (Australia) Priscilla Hon; 6–4, 7–5 | (Japan) Himeno Sakatsume | (Belgium) Sofia Costoulas (India) Ankita Raina | (Slovakia) Nina Vargová (India) Vaidehi Chaudhari (Australia) Alexandra Bozovic (Japan) Kyōka Okamura |
| November 18 | Caloundra, Australia; Hard; W50; Singles and doubles draws | (Hong Kong) Eudice Chong (Hong Kong) Cody Wong; 6–3, 6–2 | (United Kingdom) Naiktha Bains (India) Ankita Raina | (Belgium) Sofia Costoulas (India) Ankita Raina | (Slovakia) Nina Vargová (India) Vaidehi Chaudhari (Australia) Alexandra Bozovic (Japan) Kyōka Okamura |
| November 18 | Empire Women's Indoor; Trnava, Slovakia; Hard (i); W50; Singles and doubles draws | (Croatia) Antonia Ružić; 6–3, 6–2 | (Czech Republic) Tereza Valentová | (United Kingdom) Amarni Banks (Czech Republic) Dominika Šalková | (France) Océane Dodin (Australia) Maya Joint (Hungary) Amarissa Tóth (Spain) Kaitlin Quevedo |
| November 18 | Empire Women's Indoor; Trnava, Slovakia; Hard (i); W50; Singles and doubles draws | (Czech Republic) Dominika Šalková (Czech Republic) Julie Štruplová; 6–4, 6–4 | (Turkey) İpek Öz (Croatia) Tara Würth | (United Kingdom) Amarni Banks (Czech Republic) Dominika Šalková | (France) Océane Dodin (Australia) Maya Joint (Hungary) Amarissa Tóth (Spain) Kaitlin Quevedo |
| November 18 | Boca Raton, United States; Hard; W50; Singles and doubles draws | (United States) Whitney Osuigwe; 7–6^{(10–8)}, 6–3 | (Netherlands) Eva Vedder | (Japan) Mayu Crossley (United States) Anna Rogers | (Austria) Julia Grabher (Bulgaria) Lia Karatancheva (United States) Akasha Urhobo (Greece) Despina Papamichail |
| November 18 | Boca Raton, United States; Hard; W50; Singles and doubles draws | (Spain) Alicia Herrero Liñana (United States) Anna Rogers; 6–2, 6–1 | Maria Kononova; Maria Kozyreva | (Japan) Mayu Crossley (United States) Anna Rogers | (Austria) Julia Grabher (Bulgaria) Lia Karatancheva (United States) Akasha Urhobo (Greece) Despina Papamichail |
| November 18 | Santo Domingo, Dominican Republic; Hard; W35; Singles and doubles draws | (United States) Clervie Ngounoue; 6–3, 4–6, 6–2 | (Turkey) Çağla Büyükakçay | (Canada) Dasha Plekhanova (Mexico) Ana Sofía Sánchez | (Switzerland) Leonie Küng (Mexico) Victoria Rodríguez (Cyprus) Daria Frayman (United States) Sara Daavettila |
| November 18 | Santo Domingo, Dominican Republic; Hard; W35; Singles and doubles draws | (Netherlands) Jasmijn Gimbrère (Netherlands) Stéphanie Visscher; 4–6, 7–5, [10–6] | (France) Tiphanie Lemaître (Poland) Zuzanna Pawlikowska | (Canada) Dasha Plekhanova (Mexico) Ana Sofía Sánchez | (Switzerland) Leonie Küng (Mexico) Victoria Rodríguez (Cyprus) Daria Frayman (United States) Sara Daavettila |
| November 18 | Lousada, Portugal; Hard (i); W35; Singles and doubles draws | (Belgium) Hanne Vandewinkel; 6–4, 6–2 | (Switzerland) Susan Bandecchi | (Germany) Katharina Hobgarski (Spain) Andrea Lázaro García | (Poland) Martyna Kubka (Romania) Patricia Maria Țig; Polina Iatcenko (Germany) Tessa Johanna Brockmann |
| November 18 | Lousada, Portugal; Hard (i); W35; Singles and doubles draws | Yuliya Hatouka (Kazakhstan) Zhibek Kulambayeva; 6–3, 1–6, [10–4] | Polina Iatcenko (Belgium) Hanne Vandewinkel | (Germany) Katharina Hobgarski (Spain) Andrea Lázaro García | (Poland) Martyna Kubka (Romania) Patricia Maria Țig; Polina Iatcenko (Germany) Tessa Johanna Brockmann |
| November 18 | Alcalá de Henares, Spain; Hard; W15; Singles and doubles draws | (Spain) Celia Cerviño Ruiz; 2–6, 7–6^{(7–0)}, 6–4 | (China) Tian Jialin | Maria Kalyakina (Spain) Alba Rey García | (France) Maëlle Leclercq (Spain) Claudia Ferrer Pérez (United States) Kate Mansfield (Peru) Anastasia Iamachkine |
| November 18 | Alcalá de Henares, Spain; Hard; W15; Singles and doubles draws | (Poland) Anna Hertel (Serbia) Katarina Jokić; 7–6^{(7–3)}, 6–4 | (Spain) Celia Cerviño Ruiz (Spain) Claudia Ferrer Pérez | Maria Kalyakina (Spain) Alba Rey García | (France) Maëlle Leclercq (Spain) Claudia Ferrer Pérez (United States) Kate Mansfield (Peru) Anastasia Iamachkine |
| November 18 | Sharm El Sheikh, Egypt; Hard; W15; Singles and doubles draws | (Netherlands) Joy de Zeeuw; 7–6^{(7–5)}, 6–2 | Kristiana Sidorova | (Ukraine) Kateryna Lazarenko; Kira Bataikina | Alisa Kummel; Aglaya Fedorova (Kosovo) Arlinda Rushiti (Netherlands) Sarah van Emst |
| November 18 | Sharm El Sheikh, Egypt; Hard; W15; Singles and doubles draws | Aglaya Fedorova; Alisa Kummel; 6–4, 6–3 | (Netherlands) Joy De Zeeuw (Kazakhstan) Sandugash Kenzhibayeva | (Ukraine) Kateryna Lazarenko; Kira Bataikina | Alisa Kummel; Aglaya Fedorova (Kosovo) Arlinda Rushiti (Netherlands) Sarah van Emst |
| November 18 | Heraklion, Greece; Clay; W15; Singles and doubles draws | (Greece) Dimitra Pavlou; 6–4, 6–4 | (Greece) Sapfo Sakellaridi | (Serbia) Draginja Vuković (Romania) Oana Georgeta Simion | (Spain) Claudia Hoste Ferrer (Serbia) Mila Mašić (Czech Republic) Magdaléna Smékalová (Slovakia) Laura Svatíková |
| November 18 | Heraklion, Greece; Clay; W15; Singles and doubles draws | (Slovakia) Laura Svatíková (Serbia) Draginja Vuković; 6–4, 6–4 | (Latvia) Margarita Ignatjeva (Greece) Elena Korokozidi | (Serbia) Draginja Vuković (Romania) Oana Georgeta Simion | (Spain) Claudia Hoste Ferrer (Serbia) Mila Mašić (Czech Republic) Magdaléna Smékalová (Slovakia) Laura Svatíková |
| November 18 | Antalya, Turkey; Clay; W15; Singles and doubles draws | (Germany) Chantal Sauvant; 3–6, 6–2, 6–1 | (Spain) Sara Dols | (China) Ruan Zi Ying (Slovenia) Pia Lovrič | (United States) Ellie Schoppe (Romania) Briana Szabó (Germany) Nicole Rivkin (Austria) Lilli Tagger |
| November 18 | Antalya, Turkey; Clay; W15; Singles and doubles draws | (Germany) Laura Boehner (Germany) Anna Linn Puls; 6–3, 6–3 | (Germany) Nicole Rivkin (Czech Republic) Karolína Vlčková | (China) Ruan Zi Ying (Slovenia) Pia Lovrič | (United States) Ellie Schoppe (Romania) Briana Szabó (Germany) Nicole Rivkin (Austria) Lilli Tagger |
| November 18 | Monastir, Tunisia; Hard; W15; Singles and doubles draws | (France) Mathilde Lollia; 6–2, 6–2 | (Japan) Sakura Hosogi | (Romania) Andreea Prisăcariu (Italy) Federica Sacco | (Germany) Marie Vogt (Germany) Mara Guth (United Kingdom) Hephzibah Oluwadare; Arina Bulatova |
| November 18 | Monastir, Tunisia; Hard; W15; Singles and doubles draws | (Germany) Josy Daems (Austria) Mavie Österreicher; 2–6, 6–3, [10–6] | (France) Laïa Petretic (France) Alice Soulié | (Romania) Andreea Prisăcariu (Italy) Federica Sacco | (Germany) Marie Vogt (Germany) Mara Guth (United Kingdom) Hephzibah Oluwadare; Arina Bulatova |
| November 18 | Córdoba, Argentina; Clay; W15; Singles and doubles draws | (Argentina) Luisina Giovannini; 6–7^{(2–7)}, 6–2, 6–3 | (Argentina) Justina Maria Gonzalez Daniele | (Argentina) Berta Bonardi (Ecuador) Camila Romero | (Mexico) Natalia Sousa Salazar (France) Marine Le Bozec (Argentina) Carla Markus (Argentina) Sol Rabin |
| November 18 | Córdoba, Argentina; Clay; W15; Singles and doubles draws | (Argentina) Luisina Giovannini (Mexico) Marian Gómez Pezuela Cano; 6–3, 6–7^{(7–9)}, [10–8] | (Argentina) Lourdes Ayala (Argentina) María Florencia Urrutia | (Argentina) Berta Bonardi (Ecuador) Camila Romero | (Mexico) Natalia Sousa Salazar (France) Marine Le Bozec (Argentina) Carla Markus (Argentina) Sol Rabin |
| November 25 | Gold Coast Tennis International; Carrara, Australia; Hard; W75; Singles - Doubles | (Australia) Daria Saville; 7–5, 7–6^{(7–3)} | (Australia) Lizette Cabrera | (Australia) Priscilla Hon (Australia) Emerson Jones | (China) Zhang Ying (Hong Kong) Eudice Chong (Australia) Maddison Inglis (Australia) Talia Gibson |
| November 25 | Gold Coast Tennis International; Carrara, Australia; Hard; W75; Singles - Doubles | (Japan) Hikaru Sato (Japan) Eri Shimizu; 6–7^{(0–7)}, 6–3, [10–6] | (Japan) Erina Hayashi (Japan) Kanako Morisaki | (Australia) Priscilla Hon (Australia) Emerson Jones | (China) Zhang Ying (Hong Kong) Eudice Chong (Australia) Maddison Inglis (Australia) Talia Gibson |
| November 25 | Empire Women's Indoor; Trnava, Slovakia; Hard (i); W75; Singles - Doubles | (Germany) Tatjana Maria; 6–4, 6–1 | (United Kingdom) Jodie Burrage | (United States) Alycia Parks (Czech Republic) Dominika Šalková | (Switzerland) Valentina Ryser (Turkey) Berfu Cengiz (Turkey) İpek Öz (Slovakia) Mia Pohánková |
| November 25 | Empire Women's Indoor; Trnava, Slovakia; Hard (i); W75; Singles - Doubles | (United Kingdom) Madeleine Brooks (Netherlands) Isabelle Haverlag; 7–6^{(7–5)}, 6–1 | (Czech Republic) Anastasia Dețiuc (Czech Republic) Aneta Kučmová | (United States) Alycia Parks (Czech Republic) Dominika Šalková | (Switzerland) Valentina Ryser (Turkey) Berfu Cengiz (Turkey) İpek Öz (Slovakia) Mia Pohánková |
| November 25 | Sëlva Gardena, Italy; Hard (i); W50; Singles and doubles draws | (United States) Tyra Caterina Grant; 3–6, 6–1, 7–5 | (Canada) Stacey Fung | (Slovakia) Viktória Hrunčáková (Israel) Lina Glushko | (North Macedonia) Lina Gjorcheska (Lithuania) Justina Mikulskytė (Croatia) Tena Lukas (Croatia) Lea Bošković |
| November 25 | Sëlva Gardena, Italy; Hard (i); W50; Singles and doubles draws | (Poland) Martyna Kubka (Sweden) Lisa Zaar; 6–3, 6–0 | (Germany) Carolina Kuhl (Serbia) Mia Ristić | (Slovakia) Viktória Hrunčáková (Israel) Lina Glushko | (North Macedonia) Lina Gjorcheska (Lithuania) Justina Mikulskytė (Croatia) Tena Lukas (Croatia) Lea Bošković |
| November 25 | Keio Challenger; Yokohama, Japan; Hard; W50; Singles and doubles draws | Aliona Falei; 3–6, 6–1, 6–4 | (United States) Hina Inoue | (Japan) Haruka Kaji (Chinese Taipei) Liang En-shuo | (Japan) Aoi Ito (Japan) Natsumi Kawaguchi (Japan) Sayaka Ishii (Canada) Carol Zhao |
| November 25 | Keio Challenger; Yokohama, Japan; Hard; W50; Singles and doubles draws | (Japan) Momoko Kobori (Japan) Ayano Shimizu; 6–4, 7–6^{(7–2)} | (Chinese Taipei) Cho I-hsuan (Chinese Taipei) Cho Yi-tsen | (Japan) Haruka Kaji (Chinese Taipei) Liang En-shuo | (Japan) Aoi Ito (Japan) Natsumi Kawaguchi (Japan) Sayaka Ishii (Canada) Carol Zhao |
| November 25 | Santo Domingo, Dominican Republic; Hard; W35; Singles and doubles draws | (Poland) Olivia Lincer; 7–6^{(11–9)}, 3–6, 6–3 | (Spain) Carlota Martínez Círez | (Mexico) Victoria Rodríguez (Turkey) Çağla Büyükakçay | (Mexico) Ana Sofía Sánchez (France) Tiphanie Lemaître (Greece) Despina Papamichail (United States) Haley Giavara |
| November 25 | Santo Domingo, Dominican Republic; Hard; W35; Singles and doubles draws | (United States) Haley Giavara (Japan) Hiroko Kuwata; 5–7, 6–4, [10–6] | (United States) Kolie Allen (Colombia) Yuliana Monroy | (Mexico) Victoria Rodríguez (Turkey) Çağla Büyükakçay | (Mexico) Ana Sofía Sánchez (France) Tiphanie Lemaître (Greece) Despina Papamichail (United States) Haley Giavara |
| November 25 | Lousada, Portugal; Hard (i); W35; Singles and doubles draws | (France) Margaux Rouvroy; 7–5, 6–3 | (Portugal) Matilde Jorge | (Belgium) Hanne Vandewinkel; Alina Charaeva | (Spain) Eva Guerrero Álvarez (Australia) Tina Nadine Smith; Polina Iatcenko (Belgium) Jeline Vandromme |
| November 25 | Lousada, Portugal; Hard (i); W35; Singles and doubles draws | (Germany) Katharina Hobgarski (Germany) Antonia Schmidt; 6–4, 6–2 | (United States) Baylen Brown (United States) Jamilah Snells | (Belgium) Hanne Vandewinkel; Alina Charaeva | (Spain) Eva Guerrero Álvarez (Australia) Tina Nadine Smith; Polina Iatcenko (Belgium) Jeline Vandromme |
| November 25 | Ribeirão Preto, Brazil; Clay; W15; Singles and doubles draws | (Brazil) Luiza Fullana; 6–4, 7–5 | (Australia) Kaylah McPhee | (Switzerland) Marie Mettraux (Chile) Fernanda Labraña | (Brazil) Nauhany Vitória Leme da Silva (Brazil) Ana Candiotto (Peru) Romina Ccuno (Ecuador) Camila Romero |
| November 25 | Ribeirão Preto, Brazil; Clay; W15; Singles and doubles draws | (Peru) Romina Ccuno (Chile) Fernanda Labraña; 6–1, 2–6, [10–7] | (Brazil) Camilla Bossi (Brazil) Ana Candiotto | (Switzerland) Marie Mettraux (Chile) Fernanda Labraña | (Brazil) Nauhany Vitória Leme da Silva (Brazil) Ana Candiotto (Peru) Romina Ccuno (Ecuador) Camila Romero |
| November 25 | Sharm El Sheikh, Egypt; Hard; W15; Singles and doubles draws | (Chinese Taipei) Joanna Garland; 6–1, 6–1 | (Latvia) Kamilla Bartone | Anastasia Gasanova (Netherlands) Loes Ebeling Koning | (Czech Republic) Ivana Šebestová (Georgia (country)) Sofia Shapatava (Kosovo) Arlinda Rushiti (Egypt) Sandra Samir |
| November 25 | Sharm El Sheikh, Egypt; Hard; W15; Singles and doubles draws | (Netherlands) Loes Ebeling Koning (Netherlands) Sarah van Emst; 7–6^{(7–4)}, 4–6, [11–9] | (Netherlands) Joy De Zeeuw (Netherlands) Britt du Pree | Anastasia Gasanova (Netherlands) Loes Ebeling Koning | (Czech Republic) Ivana Šebestová (Georgia (country)) Sofia Shapatava (Kosovo) Arlinda Rushiti (Egypt) Sandra Samir |
| November 25 | Antalya, Turkey; Clay; W15; Singles and doubles draws | (Indonesia) Janice Tjen; 6–1, 6–2 | (Canada) Nadia Lagaev | (Romania) Briana Szabó (Bulgaria) Denislava Glushkova | (Romania) Ștefania Bojică (Italy) Gaia Squarcialupi (Belgium) Tilwith Di Girolami (Czech Republic) Karolína Vlčková |
| November 25 | Antalya, Turkey; Clay; W15; Singles and doubles draws | (Chinese Taipei) Madeline Jessup (Indonesia) Janice Tjen; 7–5, 4–6, [11–9] | (Romania) Ștefania Bojică (Romania) Briana Szabó | (Romania) Briana Szabó (Bulgaria) Denislava Glushkova | (Romania) Ștefania Bojică (Italy) Gaia Squarcialupi (Belgium) Tilwith Di Girolami (Czech Republic) Karolína Vlčková |
| November 25 | Monastir, Tunisia; Hard; W15; Singles and doubles draws | (Japan) Sakura Hosogi; 6–0, 6–2 | (France) Alyssa Réguer | Arina Bulatova (India) Zeel Desai | (Romania) Andreea Prisăcariu (France) Mathilde Lollia (Germany) Marie Vogt (France) Nina Radovanovic |
| November 25 | Monastir, Tunisia; Hard; W15; Singles and doubles draws | (United States) Julia Adams (Belgium) Vicky Van De Peer; 6–4, 6–2 | (Switzerland) Sebastianna Scilipoti (Belgium) Eliessa Vanlangendonck | Arina Bulatova (India) Zeel Desai | (Romania) Andreea Prisăcariu (France) Mathilde Lollia (Germany) Marie Vogt (France) Nina Radovanovic |

=== December ===
| Week of | Tournament | Winner | Runners-up | Semifinalists | Quarterfinalists |
|---|---|---|---|---|---|
| December 2 | Al Habtoor Tennis Challenge; Dubai, United Arab Emirates; Hard; W100; Singles – Doubles | (United Kingdom) Jodie Burrage; 6–3, 6–3 | Polina Kudermetova | (Philippines) Alex Eala (Belgium) Sofia Costoulas | (Japan) Mei Yamaguchi (Japan) Kyōka Okamura; Tatiana Prozorova (France) Amandine Hesse |
| December 2 | Al Habtoor Tennis Challenge; Dubai, United Arab Emirates; Hard; W100; Singles – Doubles | (Czech Republic) Anastasia Dețiuc; Anastasia Tikhonova; 6–3, 6–7^{(7–9)}, [10–8] | (Netherlands) Isabelle Haverlag; Elena Pridankina | (Philippines) Alex Eala (Belgium) Sofia Costoulas | (Japan) Mei Yamaguchi (Japan) Kyōka Okamura; Tatiana Prozorova (France) Amandine Hesse |
| December 2 | Tampa, United States; Clay; W50; Singles and doubles draws | (United States) Caty McNally; 6–4, 7–5 | (United States) Elvina Kalieva | (United States) Whitney Osuigwe (United States) Makenna Jones | (United Kingdom) Hannah Klugman (Canada) Kayla Cross (Romania) Irina Bara (United States) Kylie Collins |
| December 2 | Tampa, United States; Clay; W50; Singles and doubles draws | (United States) Makenna Jones (United States) Alana Smith; 7–5, 6–1 | (United States) Lexington Reed (United States) Mia Yamakita | (United States) Whitney Osuigwe (United States) Makenna Jones | (United Kingdom) Hannah Klugman (Canada) Kayla Cross (Romania) Irina Bara (United States) Kylie Collins |
| December 2 | Sharm El Sheikh, Egypt; Hard; W35; Singles and doubles draws | (Chinese Taipei) Joanna Garland; 6–4, 6–2 | (Belgium) Hanne Vandewinkel | Anastasia Gasanova (Bulgaria) Isabella Shinikova | Polina Iatcenko (Greece) Sapfo Sakellaridi (Bulgaria) Rositsa Dencheva (Egypt) Sandra Samir |
| December 2 | Sharm El Sheikh, Egypt; Hard; W35; Singles and doubles draws | Polina Iatcenko (Slovakia) Katarína Kužmová; 6–4, 6–4 | (Latvia) Kamilla Bartone (Romania) Andreea Prisăcariu | Anastasia Gasanova (Bulgaria) Isabella Shinikova | Polina Iatcenko (Greece) Sapfo Sakellaridi (Bulgaria) Rositsa Dencheva (Egypt) Sandra Samir |
| December 2 | Internazionali Tennis Val Gardena Südtirol; Ortisei, Italy; Hard (i); W35; Singles and doubles draws | (Poland) Weronika Falkowska; 6–4, 7–5 | (Italy) Silvia Ambrosio | (Lithuania) Justina Mikulskytė (Australia) Tina Nadine Smith | (Croatia) Iva Primorac (Serbia) Mia Ristić (Italy) Laura Mair (Italy) Federica Urgesi |
| December 2 | Internazionali Tennis Val Gardena Südtirol; Ortisei, Italy; Hard (i); W35; Singles and doubles draws | (Poland) Weronika Falkowska (Sweden) Lisa Zaar; 6–4, 1–6, [12–10] | Ekaterina Ovcharenko (United Kingdom) Emily Webley-Smith | (Lithuania) Justina Mikulskytė (Australia) Tina Nadine Smith | (Croatia) Iva Primorac (Serbia) Mia Ristić (Italy) Laura Mair (Italy) Federica Urgesi |
| December 2 | Joinville, Brazil; Clay (i); W15; Singles and doubles draws | (Australia) Kaylah McPhee; 6–3, 6–4 | (Argentina) Victoria Bosio | (Switzerland) Marie Mettraux (Chile) Fernanda Labraña | (Argentina) Luciana Moyano (Ecuador) Camila Romero (Brazil) Maria Eduarda Lages (Brazil) Sofia Cohen Perovani |
| December 2 | Joinville, Brazil; Clay (i); W15; Singles and doubles draws | (United States) Sabastiani Leon (Switzerland) Marie Mettraux; 7–6^{(7–3)}, 7–6^{(8–6)} | (Argentina) Luciana Moyano (Ecuador) Camila Romero | (Switzerland) Marie Mettraux (Chile) Fernanda Labraña | (Argentina) Luciana Moyano (Ecuador) Camila Romero (Brazil) Maria Eduarda Lages (Brazil) Sofia Cohen Perovani |
| December 2 | Stellenbosch, South Africa; Hard; W15; Singles and doubles draws | (South Korea) Jeong Bo-young; 6–2, 7–6^{(7–5)} | (South Africa) Jahnie van Zyl | (Germany) Yasmine Wagner (Netherlands) Stéphanie Visscher | (France) Mathilde Ngijol Carré (Belgium) Kaat Coppez (Denmark) Elena Jamshidi (India) Tanisha Kashyap |
| December 2 | Stellenbosch, South Africa; Hard; W15; Singles and doubles draws | (Denmark) Sara Borkop (France) Dune Vaissaud; 4–6, 6–1, [10–6] | (Germany) Luisa Hrda (Germany) Yasmine Wagner | (Germany) Yasmine Wagner (Netherlands) Stéphanie Visscher | (France) Mathilde Ngijol Carré (Belgium) Kaat Coppez (Denmark) Elena Jamshidi (India) Tanisha Kashyap |
| December 2 | Melilla, Spain; Clay; W15; Singles and doubles draws | (Spain) Cristina Díaz Adrover; 6–3, 6–3 | (Switzerland) Katerina Tsygourova | (Germany) Franziska Sziedat (Liechtenstein) Sylvie Zünd | (Spain) Paola Piñera Celorio (Germany) Joëlle Steur (Republic of Ireland) Celine Simunyu (Spain) Ana Giraldi Requena |
| December 2 | Melilla, Spain; Clay; W15; Singles and doubles draws | (Republic of Ireland) Celine Simunyu (Germany) Joëlle Steur; 6–4, 6–1 | (Spain) Lorena Solar Donoso (Spain) Neus Torner Sensano | (Germany) Franziska Sziedat (Liechtenstein) Sylvie Zünd | (Spain) Paola Piñera Celorio (Germany) Joëlle Steur (Republic of Ireland) Celine Simunyu (Spain) Ana Giraldi Requena |
| December 2 | Antalya, Turkey; Clay; W15; Singles and doubles draws | (Turkey) İlay Yörük; 1–6, 6–0, 6–4 | (Italy) Alessandra Mazzola | (Romania) Ioana Zvonaru (Belgium) Tilwith Di Girolami | (Italy) Jessica Bertoldo (Morocco) Yasmine Kabbaj (Romania) Bianca Bărbulescu (Bulgaria) Denislava Glushkova |
| December 2 | Antalya, Turkey; Clay; W15; Singles and doubles draws | (Italy) Lavinia Luciano (Italy) Isabella Maria Serban; 6–2, 6–3 | (China) Sun Yingqun (China) Xu Jiayu | (Romania) Ioana Zvonaru (Belgium) Tilwith Di Girolami | (Italy) Jessica Bertoldo (Morocco) Yasmine Kabbaj (Romania) Bianca Bărbulescu (Bulgaria) Denislava Glushkova |
| December 9 | Sharm El Sheikh, Egypt; Hard; W35; Singles and doubles draws | Anastasia Gasanova; 6–3, 7–6^{(7–1)} | (Chinese Taipei) Joanna Garland | (Poland) Martyna Kubka (Bulgaria) Rositsa Dencheva | (Turkey) Çağla Büyükakçay (Kosovo) Arlinda Rushiti (China) Li Zongyu (Latvia) Kamilla Bartone |
| December 9 | Sharm El Sheikh, Egypt; Hard; W35; Singles and doubles draws | (Poland) Martyna Kubka (Slovakia) Katarína Kužmová; 6–2, 7–6^{(7–2)} | Varvara Panshina; Daria Zelinskaya | (Poland) Martyna Kubka (Bulgaria) Rositsa Dencheva | (Turkey) Çağla Büyükakçay (Kosovo) Arlinda Rushiti (China) Li Zongyu (Latvia) Kamilla Bartone |
| December 9 | Solapur, India; Hard; W35; Singles and doubles draws | (India) Shrivalli Bhamidipaty; 7–5, 6–3 | (Thailand) Bunyawi Thamchaiwat | (Kazakhstan) Zhibek Kulambayeva (India) Sahaja Yamalapalli | Eva Garkusha (Latvia) Diāna Marcinkēviča (France) Tiantsoa Sarah Rakotomanga Rajaonah; Ekaterina Yashina |
| December 9 | Solapur, India; Hard; W35; Singles and doubles draws | (Thailand) Thasaporn Naklo (Thailand) Bunyawi Thamchaiwat; 6–4, 6–2 | (India) Akanksha Dileep Nitture (India) Soha Sadiq | (Kazakhstan) Zhibek Kulambayeva (India) Sahaja Yamalapalli | Eva Garkusha (Latvia) Diāna Marcinkēviča (France) Tiantsoa Sarah Rakotomanga Rajaonah; Ekaterina Yashina |
| December 9 | Mogi das Cruzes, Brazil; Clay; W15; Singles and doubles draws | (Brazil) Ana Candiotto; 6–0, 6–3 | (Ecuador) Camila Romero | (Chile) Fernanda Labraña (Switzerland) Marie Mettraux | (Brazil) Sofia Cohen Perovani (Brazil) Júlia Konishi Camargo Silva (Peru) Romina Ccuno (Brazil) Luiza Fullana |
| December 9 | Mogi das Cruzes, Brazil; Clay; W15; Singles and doubles draws | (Chile) Fernanda Labraña (Chile) Antonia Vergara Rivera; 7–5, 6–2 | (Brazil) Luiza Fullana (Brazil) Júlia Konishi Camargo Silva | (Chile) Fernanda Labraña (Switzerland) Marie Mettraux | (Brazil) Sofia Cohen Perovani (Brazil) Júlia Konishi Camargo Silva (Peru) Romina Ccuno (Brazil) Luiza Fullana |
| December 9 | Wellington, New Zealand; Hard; W15; Singles and doubles draws | (Indonesia) Janice Tjen; 6–4, 6–4 | (Japan) Shiho Akita | (France) Maelys Bougrat (Japan) Yui Chikaraishi | (New Zealand) Monique Barry (New Zealand) Jade Otway (Japan) Nanari Katsumi (Japan) Hayu Kinoshita |
| December 9 | Wellington, New Zealand; Hard; W15; Singles and doubles draws | (New Zealand) Monique Barry (Netherlands) Merel Hoedt; 6–3, 6–3 | (Japan) Shiho Akita (Japan) Nanari Katsumi | (France) Maelys Bougrat (Japan) Yui Chikaraishi | (New Zealand) Monique Barry (New Zealand) Jade Otway (Japan) Nanari Katsumi (Japan) Hayu Kinoshita |
| December 9 | Stellenbosch, South Africa; Hard; W15; Singles and doubles draws | (Netherlands) Stéphanie Visscher; 6–1, 1–0 ret. | (Denmark) Elena Jamshidi | (France) Léa Tholey (Germany) Luisa Meyer auf der Heide | (Italy) Miriana Tona (France) Astrid Cirotte (France) Lucie Pawlak (South Africa) Zoë Kruger |
| December 9 | Stellenbosch, South Africa; Hard; W15; Singles and doubles draws | (Germany) Luisa Meyer auf der Heide (Germany) Vivien Sandberg; 6–4, 6–3 | (France) Astrid Cirotte (France) Lucie Pawlak | (France) Léa Tholey (Germany) Luisa Meyer auf der Heide | (Italy) Miriana Tona (France) Astrid Cirotte (France) Lucie Pawlak (South Africa) Zoë Kruger |
| December 9 | Antalya, Turkey; Clay; W15; Singles and doubles draws | (Bulgaria) Denislava Glushkova; 6–4, 6–0 | (Serbia) Natalija Senić | (Italy) Jessica Bertoldo (Germany) Chantal Sauvant | (Georgia (country)) Sofia Shapatava (Ukraine) Krystyna Pochtovyk (Morocco) Aya El Aouni; Alisa Oktiabreva |
| December 9 | Antalya, Turkey; Clay; W15; Singles and doubles draws | (Germany) Laura Boehner (Spain) Ruth Roura Llaverias; Walkover | (Germany) Chantal Sauvant (Czech Republic) Linda Ševčíková | (Italy) Jessica Bertoldo (Germany) Chantal Sauvant | (Georgia (country)) Sofia Shapatava (Ukraine) Krystyna Pochtovyk (Morocco) Aya El Aouni; Alisa Oktiabreva |
| December 16 | Navi Mumbai, India; Hard; W50; Singles and doubles draws | (Indonesia) Priska Nugroho; 6–2, 7–6^{(7–3)} | (Thailand) Thasaporn Naklo | (China) Tian Fangran; Ekaterina Reyngold | (Poland) Zuzanna Pawlikowska (Thailand) Punnin Kovapitukted (Kazakhstan) Zhibek Kulambayeva (India) Sahaja Yamalapalli |
| December 16 | Navi Mumbai, India; Hard; W50; Singles and doubles draws | (Japan) Kanako Morisaki (Japan) Naho Sato; 4–6, 6–3, [10–7] | (India) Riya Bhatia (India) Zeel Desai | (China) Tian Fangran; Ekaterina Reyngold | (Poland) Zuzanna Pawlikowska (Thailand) Punnin Kovapitukted (Kazakhstan) Zhibek Kulambayeva (India) Sahaja Yamalapalli |
| December 16 | Tauranga, New Zealand; Hard; W35; Singles and doubles draws | (Indonesia) Janice Tjen; 6–2, 6–1 | (Japan) Hiromi Abe | (Australia) Jaimee Fourlis (Australia) Kaylah McPhee | (Japan) Shiho Akita (South Korea) Oh Eun–ji (Austria) Julia Grabher (New Zealand) Vivian Yang |
| December 16 | Tauranga, New Zealand; Hard; W35; Singles and doubles draws | (Japan) Hiromi Abe (Japan) Shiho Akita; 6–2, 6–2 | (Austria) Julia Grabher (New Zealand) Elyse Tse | (Australia) Jaimee Fourlis (Australia) Kaylah McPhee | (Japan) Shiho Akita (South Korea) Oh Eun–ji (Austria) Julia Grabher (New Zealand) Vivian Yang |
| December 16 | Antalya, Turkey; Clay; W15; Singles and doubles draws | Alisa Oktiabreva; 6–2, 1–0 ret. | (Serbia) Natalija Senić | (Romania) Ștefania Bojică (Georgia (country)) Sofia Shapatava | (Czech Republic) Sarah Melany Fajmonova (Germany) Mina Hodzic (Morocco) Aya El Aouni; Diana Demidova |
| December 16 | Antalya, Turkey; Clay; W15; Singles and doubles draws | (Romania) Ștefania Bojică (Romania) Anastasia Safta; 6–4, 7–6^{(7–4)} | (China) Sun Yifan (China) Zhao Xichen | (Romania) Ștefania Bojică (Georgia (country)) Sofia Shapatava | (Czech Republic) Sarah Melany Fajmonova (Germany) Mina Hodzic (Morocco) Aya El Aouni; Diana Demidova |
| December 23 | Ahmedabad, India; Clay; W15; Singles and doubles draws | (India) Vaishnavi Adkar; 6–2, 6–1 | (Denmark) Elena Jamshidi | Ekaterina Yashina (India) Zeel Desai | (India) Akanksha Dileep Nitture (Japan) Honoka Kobayashi (India) Maaya Rajeshwaran Revathi (United Kingdom) Jizel Matos Sequeira Fernandes |
| December 23 | Ahmedabad, India; Clay; W15; Singles and doubles draws | (India) Vaishnavi Adkar (India) Pooja Ingale; 6–3, 2–6, [12–10] | (Japan) Honoka Kobayashi (Japan) Anri Nagata | Ekaterina Yashina (India) Zeel Desai | (India) Akanksha Dileep Nitture (Japan) Honoka Kobayashi (India) Maaya Rajeshwaran Revathi (United Kingdom) Jizel Matos Sequeira Fernandes |
| December 23 | Antalya, Turkey; Clay; W15; Singles and doubles draws | (Germany) Mina Hodzic; 6–2, 4–2 ret. | (Greece) Sapfo Sakellaridi | (Switzerland) Fiona Ganz (Georgia (country)) Sofia Shapatava | Diana Demidova (Morocco) Aya El Aouni (Turkey) İlay Yörük; Anna Kartseva |
| December 23 | Antalya, Turkey; Clay; W15; Singles and doubles draws | Doubles competition was cancelled due to ongoing poor weather | | (Switzerland) Fiona Ganz (Georgia (country)) Sofia Shapatava | Diana Demidova (Morocco) Aya El Aouni (Turkey) İlay Yörük; Anna Kartseva |
