= Oxana Lyubtsova =

Ukrainian tennis player

Oxana Lyubtsova Оксана Любцова
- Country (sports): Ukraine
- Born: 13 September 1985 (age 39); Melitopol, Ukraine
- Height: 1.57 m (5 ft 2 in)
- Plays: Right (two-handed backhand)
- Prize money: $138,930

Singles
- Career record: 220–154
- Career titles: 5 ITF
- Highest ranking: No. 149 (21 July 2008)

Grand Slam singles results
- Australian Open: Q1 (2008, 2009)
- French Open: Q3 (2008)
- Wimbledon: Q2 (2006, 2008)
- US Open: Q1 (2006, 2008)

Doubles
- Career record: 46–61
- Career titles: 3 ITF
- Highest ranking: No. 254 (27 April 2009)

Oxana Lyubtsova (Ukrainian: Оксана Любцова, born 13 September 1985) is a Ukrainian former tennis player.

As a professional, her highest career singles ranking is world No. 149, achieved on 21 July 2008, and her best doubles ranking is 254, achieved on 27 April 2009.

Over her career, she won five ITF titles in singles and three in doubles.

Lyubtsova played in her first WTA Tour event when she qualified to play in the 2009 Open GDF Suez. She lost in the first round to the fourth-seeded Polish teenager Agnieszka Radwańska, 1–6, 1–6.

== ITF Circuit finals ==
$100,000 tournaments
$75,000 tournaments
$50,000 tournaments
$25,000 tournaments
$10,000 tournaments

=== Singles: 10 (5–5) ===
Result	No.	Date	Tournament	Surface	Opponent	Score
Loss	1.	8 May 2005	Warsaw, Poland	Clay	(Belarus) Tatiana Poutchek	0–6, 6–4, 2–6
Loss	2.	29 May 2005	Kyiv, Ukraine	Clay	(Russia) Alexandra Panova	6–3, 6–7^{(4)}, 0–2 ret.
Win	3.	30 October 2005	Istanbul, Turkey	Hard	(Ukraine) Mariya Koryttseva	2–6, 6–1, 6–1
Win	4.	27 November 2005	Opole, Poland	Carpet (i)	(Poland) Joanna Sakowicz	6–1, 3–6, 6–1
Win	5.	12 August 2007	Hechingen, Germany	Clay	(Croatia) Ana Vrljić	6–3, 6–2
Loss	6.	28 October 2007	Istanbul, Turkey	Hard	(Romania) Monica Niculescu	2–6, 0–6
Loss	7.	11 November 2007	Ismaning Open, Germany	Carpet (i)	(Slovakia) Martina Suchá	4–6, 4–6
Win	8.	25 November 2007	Opole, Poland	Carpet (i)	(Ukraine) Olga Savchuk	2–6, 6–4, 6–4
Win	9.	14 February 2010	Stockholm, Sweden	Carpet (i)	(Ukraine) Lesia Tsurenko	6–4, 7–5
Loss	10.	2 October 2010	Bucha, Ukraine	Clay	(Ukraine) Valentyna Ivakhnenko	2–6, 0–2 ret.

=== Doubles: 8 (3–5) ===
Result	No.	Date	Tournament	Surface	Partner	Opponents	Score
Loss	1.	16 May 2004	Antalya, Turkey	Clay	(Ukraine) Katerina Avdiyenko	(Turkey) Pemra Özgen (Spain) Gabriela Velasco Andreu	0–6, 2–6
Loss	2.	23 May 2004	Antalya, Turkey	Clay	(Ukraine) Katerina Avdiyenko	(Turkey) Pemra Özgen (Spain) Gabriela Velasco Andreu	1–6, 4–6
Loss	3.	20 June 2004	Kędzierzyn-Koźle, Poland	Clay	(Ukraine) Katerina Avdiyenko	(Czech Republic) Iveta Gerlová (Czech Republic) Sandra Záhlavová	3–6, 1–6
Loss	4.	15 January 2005	Dubai, United Arab Emirates	Hard	(Russia) Kristina Grigorian	(Austria) Daniela Klemenschits (Austria) Sandra Klemenschits	5–7, 1–6
Win	5.	11 July 2008	Rome, Italy	Clay	(Latvia) Irina Kuzmina	(Ukraine) Irina Buryachok (Austria) Patricia Mayr	6–4, 4–6, [10–7]
Win	6.	9 November 2008	Ismaning Open, Germany	Carpet (i)	(Russia) Ksenia Pervak	(Germany) Julia Görges (Germany) Laura Siegemund	6–2, 4–6, [10–7]
Win	7.	8 February 2009	Belfort, France	Carpet (i)	(Latvia) Irina Kuzmina	(France) Yulia Fedossova (France) Virginie Pichet	6–3, 3–6, [10–5]
Loss	8.	4 July 2015	Telavi Open, Georgia	Clay	(Ukraine) Kateryna Sliusar	(Russia) Ksenija Sharifova (Russia) Liubov Vasilyeva	2–6, 6–3, [7–10]
