= 2024 Ismaning Open – Singles =

Singles
- 2024 Ismaning Open

Final
- Champion: (Switzerland) Susan Bandecchi
- Runner-up: (Ukraine) Daria Snigur
- Score: 6–7^{(8–10)}, 6–2, 7–5

Events
Singles	Doubles
← 2023 ·	Ismaning Open	· 2025 →

Anastasia Zarytska is the reigning champion from when the tournament was last held in 2016, but she has since retired.

Susan Bandecchi won the title, defeating Daria Snigur in the final; 6–7^{(8–10)}, 6–2, 7–5.

== Seeds ==
1. (Czech Republic) Brenda Fruhvirtová (first round)
2. (Ukraine) Daria Snigur (final)
3. (Spain) Marina Bassols Ribera (first round)
4. (Liechtenstein) Kathinka von Deichmann (second round)
5. (Poland) Maja Chwalińska (second round, withdrew)
6. (Croatia) Lea Bošković (quarterfinals)
7. Ekaterina Makarova (first round, retired)
8. (Czech Republic) Barbora Palicová (quarterfinals)

== Draw ==
=== Key ===
- Q = Qualifier
- WC = Wild card
- LL = Lucky loser
- Alt = Alternate
- ITF = ITF entry
- PR = Protected ranking
- SR = Special ranking
- SE = Special exempt
- JE = Junior exempt
- JR = Junior Accelerator Programme entrant
- CO = College Accelerator Programme entrant
- NG = Next Gen Accelerator Program entrant
- w/o = Walkover
- r = Retired
- d = Defaulted

=== Finals ===
Semifinals
(Slovenia) Dalila Jakupović	2	3
(Switzerland) Susan Bandecchi	6	6
(Germany) Anna-Lena Friedsam	6	6^{4}	1
2	(Ukraine) Daria Snigur	4	7^{7}	6

Final
(Switzerland) Susan Bandecchi	6^{8}	6	7
2	(Ukraine) Daria Snigur	7^{10}	2	5

=== Top half ===
First round
1	(Czech Republic) B Fruhvirtová	4	4
Q	(Czech Republic) A Laboutková	6	6
(Slovenia) D Jakupović	6	2	6
Q	(United States) J Daniel	0	6	3
WC	(Germany) M Guth	6	6
Q	(Slovakia) R Zelníčková	4	3
(Czech Republic) A Kučmová	4	3
6	(Croatia) L Bošković	6	6
3	(Spain) M Bassols Ribera	5	6^{2}
J Avdeeva	7	7^{7}
(Poland) G Feistel	1	6	6^{5}
(Switzerland) S Bandecchi	6	2	7^{7}
(France) C Monnet	4	4
WC	(Germany) C Kuhl	6	6
Q	(Germany) F Gettwart	6	3	2
5	(Poland) M Chwalińska	4	6	6

Second round
Q	(Czech Republic) A Laboutková	3	6^{5}
(Slovenia) D Jakupović	6	7^{7}
WC	(Germany) M Guth	4	7^{7}	3
6	(Croatia) L Bošković	6	6^{5}	6
J Avdeeva	6	6^{5}	4
(Switzerland) S Bandecchi	4	7^{7}	6
WC	(Germany) C Kuhl	w/o
5	(Poland) M Chwalińska

Quarterfinals
(Slovenia) D Jakupović	2	7^{7}	6
6	(Croatia) L Bošković	6	6^{5}	4
(Switzerland) S Bandecchi	6	6
WC	(Germany) C Kuhl	4	3

Semifinals
(Slovenia) D Jakupović	2	3
(Switzerland) S Bandecchi	6	6

=== Bottom half ===
First round
8	(Czech Republic) B Palicová	6	6^{5}	6
(Czech Republic) J Štruplová	3	7^{7}	2
(Germany) S Wagner	3	4
(Bulgaria) I Shinikova	6	6
WC	(Germany) J Middendorf	0^{r}
(Germany) A-L Friedsam	3
SR	K Dmitruk	4	3
4	(Liechtenstein) K von Deichmann	6	6
7	E Makarova	3	0^{r}
Q	(Germany) M Thamm	6	3
Q	(Germany) M Khomich	3	3
(Germany) N Schunk	6	6
Q	(Germany) V Steiner	4	6^{5}
WC	(Germany) A Schmidt	6	7^{7}
Q	(Germany) L Schmidt	1	3
2	(Ukraine) D Snigur	6	6

Second round
8	(Czech Republic) B Palicová	6	6
(Bulgaria) I Shinikova	2	2
(Germany) A-L Friedsam	6	7^{8}
4	(Liechtenstein) K von Deichmann	4	6^{6}
Q	(Germany) M Thamm	6	6
(Germany) N Schunk	4	3
WC	(Germany) A Schmidt	1	1
2	(Ukraine) D Snigur	6	6

Quarterfinals
8	(Czech Republic) B Palicová	4	6^{4}
(Germany) A-L Friedsam	6	7^{7}
Q	(Germany) M Thamm	6^{4}	2
2	(Ukraine) D Snigur	7^{7}	6

Semifinals
(Germany) A-L Friedsam	6	6^{4}	1
2	(Ukraine) D Snigur	4	7^{7}	6
