= Ismaning Open =

- 2024 Ismaning Open

ITF Women's Tour
- Event name: Ismaning Open (2014–present); Büschl Open (2006–2012)
- Location: Ismaning, Germany
- Venue: TC Ismaning
- Category: ITF Women's Circuit
- Surface: Carpet / indoors
- Draw: 32S/32Q/16D
- Prize money: US$60,000
- Website: Official Website

The Ismaning Open was a tournament for female professional tennis players played on indoor carpet courts. The event was classified as a 10k ITF Women's Circuit tournament, however has previously had larger prize money. It was held in Ismaning, Germany, from 2006 to 2016.

== Past finals ==
=== Singles ===
Year	Champion	Runner-up	Score
2024	(Switzerland) Susan Bandecchi	(Ukraine) Daria Snigur	6–7^{(8–10)}, 6–2, 7–5
2017–23	not held		
2016	(Ukraine) Anastasia Zarytska	(Switzerland) Tess Sugnaux	6–2, 7–6^{(8–6)}
2015	(Romania) Laura Ioana Andrei	(Croatia) Adrijana Lekaj	6–2, 6–2
2014–13	not held		
2012	(Germany) Annika Beck	(Czech Republic) Eva Birnerová	6–3, 7–6^{(10–8)}
2011	(United Kingdom) Anne Keothavong	(Austria) Yvonne Meusburger	6–3, 1–6, 6–2
2010	(Poland) Urszula Radwańska	(Czech Republic) Andrea Hlaváčková	7–5, 6–4
2009	(Czech Republic) Barbora Záhlavová-Strýcová	(Germany) Kristina Barrois	6–4, 4–6, 7–6^{(7–5)}
2008	(Germany) Tatjana Malek	(Germany) Kristina Barrois	6–2, 6–3
2007	(Slovakia) Martina Suchá	(Ukraine) Oksana Lyubtsova	6–4, 6–4
2006	(Italy) Astrid Besser	(Russia) Anastasia Pivovarova	6–3, 6–3

=== Doubles ===
Year	Champions	Runners-up	Score
2024	(Czech Republic) Aneta Kučmová (Czech Republic) Aneta Laboutková	(Netherlands) Isabelle Haverlag (France) Carole Monnet	4–6, 6–4, [10–7]
2017–23	not held		
2016	(Germany) Julia Kimmelmann (Germany) Franziska Kommer	(Switzerland) Tamara Arnold (Germany) Caroline Werner	3–6, 6–3, [10–8]
2015	(Germany) Lena Rüffer (Germany) Anna Zaja	(Belgium) Michaela Boev (Germany) Hristina Dishkova	5–7, 7–6^{(7–3)}, [10–3]
2014–13	not held		
2012	(Switzerland) Romina Oprandi (Switzerland) Amra Sadiković	(United States) Jill Craybas (Czech Republic) Eva Hrdinová	4–6, 6–3, [10–7]
2011	(Netherlands) Kiki Bertens (United Kingdom) Anne Keothavong	(Germany) Kristina Barrois (Austria) Yvonne Meusburger	6–3, 6–3
2010	(Germany) Kristina Barrois (Germany) Anna-Lena Grönefeld	(Ukraine) Tetyana Arefyeva (Ukraine) Yuliana Fedak	6–1, 7–6^{(7–3)}
2009	(Greece) Eleni Daniilidou (Germany) Jasmin Wöhr	(Belarus) Ekaterina Dzehalevich (Czech Republic) Eva Hrdinová	6–2, 4–6, [10–5]
2008	(Ukraine) Oksana Lyubtsova (Russia) Ksenia Pervak	(Germany) Julia Görges (Germany) Laura Siegemund	6–2, 4–6, [10–7]
2007	(Germany) Kristina Barrois (Germany) Julia Görges	(Czech Republic) Andrea Hlaváčková (Czech Republic) Lucie Hradecká	2–6, 6–2, [10–7]
2006	(Austria) Eva-Maria Hoch (Germany) Lydia Steinbach	(Germany) Sabrina Jolk (Germany) Annette Kolb	6–2, 6–1
