= 2024 Ismaning Open – Doubles =

Doubles
- 2024 Ismaning Open

Final
- Champion: (Czech Republic) Aneta Kučmová (Czech Republic) Aneta Laboutková
- Runner-up: (Netherlands) Isabelle Haverlag (France) Carole Monnet
- Score: 4–6, 6–4, [10–7]

Events
Singles	Doubles
← 2023 ·	Ismaning Open	· 2025 →

Julia Kimmelmann and Franziska Kommer was the reigning champion from when the tournament was last held in 2016, but chose not to participate.

Aneta Kučmová and Aneta Laboutková won the title, defeating Isabelle Haverlag and Carole Monnet in the final; 4–6, 6–4, [10–7].

== Seeds ==
1. (Netherlands) Isabelle Haverlag / (France) Carole Monnet (final)
2. (United Kingdom) Madeleine Brooks / (United Kingdom) Freya Christie (first round)
3. (United Kingdom) Alicia Barnett / (Germany) Anna-Lena Friedsam (first round)
4. (Bulgaria) Isabella Shinikova / (Czech Republic) Julie Štruplová (quarterfinals)

== Draw ==
=== Key ===
- Q = Qualifier
- WC = Wild card
- LL = Lucky loser
- Alt = Alternate
- ITF = ITF entry
- PR = Protected ranking
- SR = Special ranking
- SE = Special exempt
- JE = Junior exempt
- JR = Junior Accelerator Programme entrant
- CO = College Accelerator Programme entrant
- NG = Next Gen Accelerator Program entrant
- w/o = Walkover
- r = Retired
- d = Defaulted

=== Draw ===
First round
1	(Netherlands) I Haverlag (France) C Monnet	6	6
(Germany) G Groth (Germany) K Hofbauer	3	1
(Germany) M Guth (Germany) A Schmidt	3	5
(Germany) L Schmidt (Germany) E Seibold	6	7
3	(United Kingdom) A Barnett (Germany) A-L Friedsam	6^{12}	5
(United States) J Daniel; K Dmitruk	7^{14}	7
(Slovakia) V Lacková (Slovakia) E Mravcová	2	6^{3}
(Slovakia) S Milatová (Germany) M Vogt	6	7^{7}
(Germany) L Böhner (Ukraine) A Firman	2	2
(Germany) N Rivkin (Czech Republic) K Vlčková	6	6
(Germany) C Kuhl (Germany) N Schunk	3	7	[4]
4	(Bulgaria) I Shinikova (Czech Republic) J Štruplová	6	5	[10]
(Germany) S-R Sekulic (Germany) A Wildgruber	5	5
(Czech Republic) A Kučmová (Czech Republic) A Laboutková	7	7
J Avdeeva (Slovakia) R Zelníčková	6	6
2	(United Kingdom) M Brooks (United Kingdom) F Christie	2	4

Quarterfinals
1	(Netherlands) I Haverlag (France) C Monnet	6	6
(Germany) L Schmidt (Germany) E Seibold	0	0
(United States) J Daniel; K Dmitruk	6	6
(Slovakia) S Milatová (Germany) M Vogt	2	2
(Germany) N Rivkin (Czech Republic) K Vlčková	6	7^{7}
4	(Bulgaria) I Shinikova (Czech Republic) J Štruplová	4	6^{5}
(Czech Republic) A Kučmová (Czech Republic) A Laboutková	6	5	[10]
J Avdeeva (Slovakia) R Zelníčková	3	7	[7]

Semifinals
1	(Netherlands) I Haverlag (France) C Monnet	7	5	[10]
(United States) J Daniel; K Dmitruk	5	7	[8]
(Germany) N Rivkin (Czech Republic) K Vlčková	4	1
(Czech Republic) A Kučmová (Czech Republic) A Laboutková	6	6

Final
1	(Netherlands) I Haverlag (France) C Monnet	6	4	[7]
(Czech Republic) A Kučmová (Czech Republic) A Laboutková	4	6	[10]
