= 2024 Ismaning Open =

Tennis tournament

- Date: 4–10 November 2024
- Edition: 10th
- Category: ITF Women's World Tennis Tour
- Prize money: $60,000
- Surface: Carpet / Indoor
- Location: Ismaning, Germany

Champions

Singles
- (Switzerland) Susan Bandecchi

Doubles
- (Czech Republic) Aneta Kučmová / (Czech Republic) Aneta Laboutková
- Ismaning Open

The 2024 Ismaning Open is a professional tennis tournament played on indoor carpet courts. It is the tenth edition of the tournament which was part of the 2024 ITF Women's World Tennis Tour. It took place in Ismaning, Germany between 4 and 10 November 2024. The last edition of the tournament was in 2016. From 2017 to 2023, Ismaning hosted a men's tournament as part of the ATP Challenger Tour under the name Wolffkran Open.

== Champions ==
=== Singles ===
- (Switzerland) Susan Bandecchi def. (Ukraine) Daria Snigur, 6–7^{(8–10)}, 6–2, 7–5

=== Doubles ===
- (Czech Republic) Aneta Kučmová / (Czech Republic) Aneta Laboutková def. (Netherlands) Isabelle Haverlag / (France) Carole Monnet, 4–6, 6–4, [10–7]

== Singles main draw entrants ==
=== Seeds ===
Country	Player	Rank^{1}	Seed
CZE	Brenda Fruhvirtová	121	1
UKR	Daria Snigur	134	2
ESP	Marina Bassols Ribera	151	3
LIE	Kathinka von Deichmann	171	4
POL	Maja Chwalińska	175	5
CRO	Lea Bošković	180	6
	Ekaterina Makarova	204	7
CZE	Barbora Palicová	208	8

- ^{1} Rankings are as of 28 October 2024.

=== Other entrants ===
The following players received wildcards into the singles main draw:

- (Germany) Mara Guth
- (Germany) Carolina Kuhl
- (Germany) Julia Middendorf
- (Germany) Antonia Schmidt
- The following player received entry into the singles main draw using a special ranking:
- Kristina Dmitruk

The following players received entry from the qualifying draw:

- (United States) Jaeda Daniel
- (Germany) Fabienne Gettwart
- (Germany) Michelle Khomich
- (Czech Republic) Aneta Laboutková
- (Germany) Lara Schmidt
- (Germany) Valentina Steiner
- (Germany) Mariella Thamm
- (Slovakia) Radka Zelníčková
