= Aneta Laboutková =

Czech tennis player

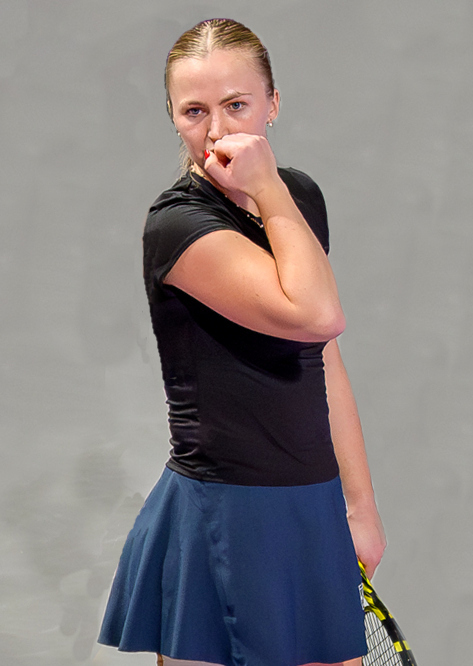
- Laboutková at the 2026 Transylvania Open
- Country (sports): Czech Republic
- Born: 10 May 2000 (age 26) Prague, Czech Republic
- Plays: Right-handed
- Prize money: US$ 118,097

Singles
- Career record: 233–217
- Career titles: 1 ITF
- Highest ranking: No. 404 (14 September 2026)
- Current ranking: No. 404 (28 September 2026)

Doubles
- Career record: 185–141
- Career titles: 1 WTA 125, 15 ITF
- Highest ranking: No. 116 (28 September 2026)
- Current ranking: No. 116 (28 September 2026)
- Last updated on: 10 October 2026.

Aneta Laboutková (born 10 May 2000) is a Czech tennis player.

Laboutková has a career-high singles ranking by the WTA of 404, reached on 14 September 2026, and a best doubles ranking of world No. 116, achieved on 28 September 2026.

== Career ==
Laboutková won her first W75 title at the 2024 Ismaning Open in the doubles draw, partnering with Aneta Kučmová.

== WTA 125 finals ==
=== Doubles: 2 (1 title, 1 runner-up) ===
Result	W–L	Date	Tournament	Surface	Partner	Opponents	Score
Win	1–0	Sep 2026	Antalya Challenger, Turkey	Clay	(Czech Republic) Aneta Kučmová	Alevtina Ibragimova; Ksenia Zaytseva	4–6, 6–2, [10–6]
Loss	1–1	Sep 2026	Tolentino Open, Italy	Clay	(Czech Republic) Aneta Kučmová	(Greece) Despina Papamichail (Georgia (country)) Ekaterine Gorgodze	1–6, 2–6

== ITF Circuit finals ==
=== Singles: 1 (title) ===
Legend W15 tournaments (1–0)	Finals by surface Clay (1–0)

Result	Date	Tournament	Tier	Surface	Opponent	Score
Win	May 2019	ITF Gothenburg, Sweden	W15	Clay	(Sweden) Caijsa Hennemann	2–6, 7–6^{(4)}, 6–3

=== Doubles: 26 (15 titles, 11 runner-ups) ===
Legend W100 tournaments (2–0) W60/75 tournaments (3–5) W35 tournaments (3–1) W10/15 tournaments (7–5)	Finals by surface Hard (5–3) Clay (9–8) Carpet (1–0)

Result	W–L	Date	Location	Tier	Surface	Partner	Opponents	Score
Win	1–0	Sep 2016	ITF Brno, Czech Republic	W10	Clay	(Czech Republic) Aneta Kladivová	(Poland) Maja Chwalińska (Poland) Paulina Czarnik	7–6^{(5)}, 3–6, [12–10]
Loss	1–1	Jun 2018	ITF Jablonec nad Nisou, Czech Republic	W15	Clay	(Czech Republic) Radka Bužková	(Czech Republic) Michaela Bayerlová (Germany) Eva Marie Voracek	5–7, 6–4, [11–13]
Loss	1–2	Aug 2018	ITF Budapest, Hungary	W15	Clay	(Czech Republic) Klára Hájková	(Canada) Petra Januskova (Latvia) Daniela Vismane	5–7, 6–3, [9–11]
Win	2–2	Oct 2018	ITF Telde, Spain	W15	Clay	(Czech Republic) Klára Hájková	(Spain) Carlota Molina Megías (Belarus) Anastasiya Yakimova	1–6, 7–5, [10–5]
Loss	2–3	May 2019	ITF Gothenburg, Sweden	W15	Clay	(Czech Republic) Klára Hájková	(Sweden) Caijsa Hennemann (Sweden) Melis Yasar	2–6, 3–6
Win	3–3	Aug 2019	ITF Olomouc, Czech Republic	W15	Clay	(Czech Republic) Klára Hájková	(Slovenia) Pia Lovrič (Japan) Himari Sato	6–4, 2–6, [10–4]
Win	4–3	Oct 2019	ITF Urtijëi, Italy	W15	Hard	(Czech Republic) Klára Hájková	(Italy) Claudia Giovine (Russia) Maria Marfutina	6–3, 3–6, [10–7]
Win	5–3	Mar 2021	ITF Antalya, Turkey	W15	Clay	(Czech Republic) Miriam Škoch	(Russia) Darya Astakhova (Slovenia) Nika Radišić	6–3, 4–6, [10–6]
Loss	5–4	Jul 2022	Amstelveen Open, Netherlands	W60	Clay	(Czech Republic) Michaela Bayerlová	(Spain) Aliona Bolsova (Spain) Guiomar Maristany	2–6, 2–6
Loss	5–5	Apr 2023	ITF Telde, Spain	W15	Clay	(Spain) Claudia Hoste Ferrer	(Spain) Marta Huqi González Encinas (United States) Amy Zhu	7–6^{(5)}, 3–6, [8–10]
Win	6–5	May 2024	ITF Bol, Croatia	W15	Clay	(Czech Republic) Denisa Hindová	(Switzerland) Marie Mettraux (Netherlands) Stéphanie Visscher	6–3, 6–4
Win	7–5	Jul 2024	ITF Grodzisk Mazowiecki, Poland	W15	Hard	(United Kingdom) Eliz Maloney	(Germany) Annemarie Lazar (Poland) Aleksandra Zuchańska	6–1, 3–6, [10–3]
Loss	7–6	Aug 2024	ITF Bielsko-Biała, Poland	W15	Clay	(Czech Republic) Karolína Kubáňová	(Poland) Weronika Ewald (Poland) Daria Kuczer	5–7, 6–1, [6–10]
Win	8–6	Nov 2024	Ismaning Open, Germany	W75	Carpet (i)	(Czech Republic) Aneta Kučmová	(Netherlands) Isabelle Haverlag (France) Carole Monnet	4–6, 6–4, [10–7]
Win	9–6	Jan 2025	ITF Esch-sur-Alzette, Luxembourg	W35	Hard (i)	(Czech Republic) Aneta Kučmová	(Ukraine) Veronika Podrez (France) Marine Szostak	6–3, 6–2
Win	10–6	Jun 2025	ITF Klagenfurt, Austria	W35	Clay	(Czech Republic) Julie Štruplová	(Italy) Anastasia Abbagnato; Daria Lodikova	4–6, 7–6^{(4)}, [11–9]
Win	11–6	Jul 2025	Figueira da Foz Open, Portugal	W100	Hard	(Lithuania) Justina Mikulskytė	(Portugal) Francisca Jorge (Portugal) Matilde Jorge	6–4, 3–6, [10–6]
Loss	11–7	Jul 2025	ITF Cordenons, Italy	W75	Clay	(Czech Republic) Karolína Kubáňová	(Chinese Taipei) Liang En-shuo (Thailand) Peangtarn Plipuech	4–6, 2–6
Loss	11–8	Oct 2025	Slovak Open, Slovakia	W75	Hard (i)	(Poland) Martyna Kubka	(Czech Republic) Lucie Havlíčková (United Kingdom) Lily Miyazaki	6–3, 3–6, [9–11]
Loss	11–9	Feb 2026	Trnava Indoor, Slovakia	W75	Hard (i)	(Czech Republic) Aneta Kučmová	(Australia) Olivia Gadecki (Russia) Anastasia Tikhonova	3–6, 3–6
Win	12–9	Apr 2026	ITF Calvi, France	W75	Hard (i)	(Czech Republic) Aneta Kučmová	(Czech Republic) Michaela Bayerlová (Australia) Tenika McGiffin	6–4, 3–6, [10–3]
Loss	12–10	Apr 2026	Chiasso Open, Switzerland	W75	Clay	(Czech Republic) Aneta Kučmová	(United States) Rasheeda McAdoo (Greece) Sapfo Sakellaridi	2–6, 6–3, [8–10]
Loss	12–11	Apr 2026	ITF Nottingham, UK	W35	Hard	(Slovenia) Kristina Novak	(United Kingdom) Freya Christie (United Kingdom) Eden Silva	1–6, 0–6
Win	13–11	Jun 2026	ITF Tarvisio, Italy	W35	Clay	(Czech Republic) Aneta Kučmová	(Greece) Sapfo Sakellaridi (Slovakia) Radka Zelníčková	6–0, 6–3
Win	14–11	Jul 2026	Ladies Open Amstetten, Austria	W100	Clay	(Czech Republic) Aneta Kučmová	(Spain) Ángela Fita Boluda (Czech Republic) Anna Sisková	6–1, 1–6, [16–14]
Win	15–11	Aug 2026	ITF Leipzig, Germany	W75	Clay	(Czech Republic) Aneta Kučmová	(United States) Rasheeda McAdoo (Greece) Sapfo Sakellaridi	7–5, 6–2
