= 2026 Huzhou Open – Singles =

Singles
- 2026 Huzhou Open

Final
- Champion: (Poland) Katarzyna Kawa
- Runner-up: (Slovenia) Veronika Erjavec
- Score: 6–0, 6–4

Events
Singles	Doubles
- Huzhou Open

Katarzyna Kawa won the title, defeating defending champion Veronika Erjavec 6–0, 6–4 in the final.

== Seeds ==
1. (Slovenia) Veronika Erjavec (final)
2. (Greece) Despina Papamichail (first round)
3. (Poland) Katarzyna Kawa (champion)
4. (China) Wang Xiyu (semifinals)
5. (China) Guo Hanyu (semifinals)
6. (China) Ma Yexin (first round)
7. (China) You Xiaodi (first round)
8. (China) Gao Xinyu (first round)

== Draw ==
Key

- Q = Qualifier
- WC = Wild card
- LL = Lucky loser
- Alt = Alternate
- ITF = ITF entry
- PR = Protected ranking
- SR = Special ranking
- SE = Special exempt
- JE = Junior exempt
- JR = Junior Accelerator Programme entrant
- CO = College Accelerator Programme entrant
- NG = Next Gen Accelerator Program entrant
- w/o = Walkover
- r = Retired
- d = Defaulted

=== Finals ===
Semifinals
1	(Slovenia) Veronika Erjavec	6	7^{7}
4	(China) Wang Xiyu	4	6^{3}
3	(Poland) Katarzyna Kawa	6	6
5	(China) Guo Hanyu	4	1

Final
1	(Slovenia) Veronika Erjavec	0	4
3	(Poland) Katarzyna Kawa	6	6

=== Top half ===
First round
1	(Slovenia) V Erjavec	6	6
WC	(China) M Wang	0	3
(Lithuania) J Mikulskytė	3	3
S Lansere	6	6
(Italy) J Pieri	6^{2}	4
(China) S Wei	7^{7}	6
(China) W Zheng	6	6
6	(China) Y Ma	3	4
4	(China) Xiy Wang	6	6
Q	(Kazakhstan) Z Kulambayeva	3	4
A Zolotareva	3	6	3
Q	(China) C Yuan	6	1	6
(China) Y Ren	6	6
(China) Y Yang	2	1
(Slovenia) P Hercog	4	7^{7}	6
8/WC	(China) X Gao	6	6^{5}	3

Second round
1	(Slovenia) V Erjavec	6	6
S Lansere	3	3
(China) S Wei	3^{r}
(China) W Zheng	4
4	(China) Xiy Wang	6	6
Q	(China) C Yuan	4	4
(China) Y Ren	7	1	4
(Slovenia) P Hercog	5	6	6

Quarterfinals
1	(Slovenia) V Erjavec	6	6
(China) W Zheng	2	4
4	(China) Xiy Wang	6	6^{5}	6
(Slovenia) P Hercog	3	7^{7}	4

Semifinals
1	(Slovenia) V Erjavec	6	7^{7}
4	(China) Xiy Wang	4	6^{3}

=== Bottom half ===
First round
7	(China) X You	6	5	5
WC	(China) Jia Lu	4	7	7
(Italy) D Spiteri	4	6	3
Q	V Panshina	6	4	6
A Ibragimova	6	2	6
(China) H Shi	3	6	2
PR	(Canada) C Zhao	2	1
3	(Poland) K Kawa	6	6
5	(China) H Guo	6	7^{7}
(Slovenia) D Jakupović	3	6^{3}
(Italy) D Cherubini	6	6
E Reyngold	4	3
(Japan) S Saito	2	7^{9}	4
(China) X Yao	6	6^{7}	6
Q	R Zolotareva	4	6	6
2	(Greece) D Papamichail	6	1	2

Second round
WC	(China) Jia Lu	1	3
Q	V Panshina	6	6
A Ibragimova	4	2
3	(Poland) K Kawa	6	6
5	(China) H Guo	7^{7}	6
(Italy) D Cherubini	6^{0}	0
(China) X Yao	6^{3}	6	3
Q	R Zolotareva	7^{7}	2	6

Quarterfinals
Q	V Panshina	3	6	1
3	(Poland) K Kawa	6	4	6
5	(China) H Guo	6	6
Q	R Zolotareva	2	1

Semifinals
3	(Poland) K Kawa	6	6
5	(China) H Guo	4	1

== Qualifying ==
=== Seeds ===
1. Kristiana Sidorova (withdrew)
2. (Kazakhstan) Zhibek Kulambayeva (qualified)
3. (China) Wang Jiaqi (qualifying competition)
4. Rada Zolotareva (qualified)
5. (Japan) Ikumi Yamazaki (first round)
6. Varvara Panshina (qualified)
7. (China) Guo Meiqi (qualifying competition)
8. (China) Yuan Chengyiyi (qualified)

=== Qualifiers ===
1. (China) Yuan Chengyiyi
2. (Kazakhstan) Zhibek Kulambayeva
3. Varvara Panshina
4. Rada Zolotareva

=== Qualifying draw ===
==== First qualifier ====
First round
Alt	(Japan) Naoko Eto	1	0
(United States) Amy Zhu	6	6
(China) Huang Yujia	6^{4}	4
8	(China) Yuan Chengyiyi	7^{7}	6

Qualifying competition
(United States) Amy Zhu	3	6	5
8	(China) Yuan Chengyiyi	6	3	7

==== Second qualifier ====
First round
2	(Kazakhstan) Zhibek Kulambayeva	6	6
(China) Ye Shiyu	2	2
(Japan) Hiroko Kuwata	3	3
7	(China) Guo Meiqi	6	6

Qualifying competition
2	(Kazakhstan) Zhibek Kulambayeva	6	7^{8}
7	(China) Guo Meiqi	1	6^{6}

==== Third qualifier ====
First round
3	(China) Wang Jiaqi	6	6
(Thailand) Peangtarn Plipuech	2	3
(China) Dang Yiming	3	6	4
6	Varvara Panshina	6	3	6

Qualifying competition
3	(China) Wang Jiaqi	2	2
6	Varvara Panshina	6	6

==== Fourth qualifier ====
First round
4	Rada Zolotareva	6	7
WC	(China) Ye Qiuyu	3	5
WC	(China) Wei Zhangqian	7^{7}	6
5	(Japan) Ikumi Yamazaki	6^{5}	2

Qualifying competition
4	Rada Zolotareva	6	6
WC	(China) Wei Zhangqian	3	1
