= 2026 Huzhou Open =

- Date: 27 April–3 May 2026
- Edition: 2nd
- Category: WTA 125
- Prize money: $115,000
- Surface: Clay
- Location: Huzhou, China

Champions

Singles
- (Poland) Katarzyna Kawa

Doubles
- Sofya Lansere / Anastasia Zolotareva
- Huzhou Open

The 2026 Huzhou Open was a professional women's tennis tournament played on outdoor clay courts. It was the second edition of the tournament and part of the 2026 WTA 125 Circuit. It took place at the Huzhou International Tennis Center in Huzhou, China between 27 April and 3 May 2026.

== Singles main-draw entrants ==
=== Seeds ===
Country	Player	Rank^{1}	Seed
SLO	Veronika Erjavec	96	1
GRE	Despina Papamichail	162	2
POL	Katarzyna Kawa	163	3
CHN	Wang Xiyu	170	4
CHN	Guo Hanyu	173	5
CHN	Ma Yexin	175	6
CHN	You Xiaodi	194	7
CHN	Gao Xinyu	230	8

- ^{1} Rankings are as of 20 April 2026.

=== Other entrants ===
The following players received wildcards into the singles main draw:

- (China) Gao Xinyu
- (China) Lu Jiajing
- (China) Wang Meiling

The following player received entry using a protected ranking:

- (Canada) Carol Zhao

The following players received entry from the qualifying draw:

- (Kazakhstan) Zhibek Kulambayeva
- Varvara Panshina
- (China) Yuan Chengyiyi
- Rada Zolotareva

=== Withdrawals ===
Before the tournament

- (France) Kristina Mladenovic → replaced by (Italy) Diletta Cherubini
- Alisa Oktiabreva → replaced by (Slovenia) Dalila Jakupović
- (Italy) Camilla Rosatello → replaced by (China) Wei Sijia
- Mariia Tkacheva → replaced by (China) Yao Xinxin

=== Retirement ===
- (China) Wei Sijia

== Doubles entrants ==
=== Seeds ===
Country	Player	Country	Player	Rank^{1}	Seed
THA	Peangtarn Plipuech	CHN	Zheng Wushuang	268	1
HKG	Eudice Chong	HKG	Cody Wong	299	2
JPN	Hiroko Kuwata	TPE	Li Yu-yun	356	3
	Alevtina Ibragimova	SLO	Dalila Jakupović	437	4

- ^{1} Rankings as of 20 April 2026.

=== Withdrawals ===
During the tournament

- (Kazakhstan) Zhibek Kulambayeva / Ekaterina Reyngold (shoulder)
- (Lithuania) Justina Mikulskytė / (Greece) Despina Papamichail (illness)

== Champions ==
=== Singles ===
- (Poland) Katarzyna Kawa def. (Slovenia) Veronika Erjavec 6–0, 6–4

=== Doubles ===
- Sofya Lansere / Anastasia Zolotareva def. (Japan) Hiroko Kuwata / (Chinese Taipei) Li Yu-yun 6–4, 6–1
