= 2026 Suzhou Open =

- Date: 5–11 October
- Edition: 10th
- Category: WTA 125 tournaments
- Prize money: $115,000
- Surface: Hard
- Location: Suzhou, China

Champions

Singles
- (Slovakia) Rebecca Šramková

Doubles
- (Chinese Taipei) Li Yu-yun / (China) Zhang Ying
- Suzhou Ladies Open

The 2026 Suzhou Open was a professional women's tennis tournament played on outdoor hard courts. It was the tenth edition of the tournament and part of the 2026 WTA 125 tournaments. It took place at the Sungent International Tennis Center in Suzhou, China between 5 and 11 October 2026.

== Singles main-draw entrants ==
=== Seeds ===
Country	Player	Rank^{1}	Seed
UKR	Oleksandra Oliynykova	47	1
GER	Tamara Korpatsch	53	2
~~KAZ~~	~~Yulia Putintseva~~	~~82~~	~~3~~
CZE	Darja Vidmanova	88	4
UKR	Mananchaya Sawangkaew	90	5
MEX	Renata Zarazúa	94	6
USA	Claire Liu	97	7
JPN	Moyuka Uchijima	106	8

- ^{1} Rankings are as of 28 September 2026.

=== Other entrants ===
The following players received wildcards into the singles main draw:

- (China) Bai Zhuoxuan
- (China) Shao Yushan
- (China) Yao Xinxin
- (China) Zhang Ruien

The following players received entry from the qualifying draw:

- Darya Khamutsianskaya
- (Japan) Kyōka Okamura
- (China) Shi Han
- (China) Zheng Wushuang

The following players received entry into the main draw as lucky losers:

- (China) Lu Jiajing
- (Ukraine) Katarina Zavatska

=== Withdrawals ===
Before the tournament

- (Hungary) Anna Bondár → replaced by (Czech Republic) Linda Fruhvirtová
- (Australia) Talia Gibson → replaced by (Australia) Emerson Jones
- (Switzerland) Viktorija Golubic → replaced by (Slovakia) Rebecca Šramková
- (Australia) Maya Joint → replaced by (China) Guo Hanyu
- Alina Korneeva → replaced by Aliona Falei
- (Uzbekistan) Polina Kudermetova → replaced by Tatiana Prozorova
- (Croatia) Petra Marčinko → replaced by (Italy) Tyra Caterina Grant
- (United States) Alycia Parks → replaced by Aliaksandra Sasnovich
- (Kazakhstan) Yulia Putintseva → replaced by (Ukraine) Katarina Zavatska (LL)
- (Uzbekistan) Kamilla Rakhimova → replaced by Alevtina Ibragimova
- (Egypt) Mayar Sherif → replaced by (China) Ma Yexin
- (Ukraine) Daria Snigur → replaced by Alexandra Shubladze → replaced by (China) Lu Jiajing (LL)
- (Thailand) Lanlana Tararudee → replaced by (United States) Elvina Kalieva
- (Denmark) Clara Tauson → replaced by (France) Elsa Jacquemot
- (Indonesia) Janice Tjen → replaced by (Japan) Mai Hontama
- (Belgium) Hanne Vandewinkel → replaced by (Belgium) Sofia Costoulas
- (United States) Katie Volynets → replaced by Darya Astakhova

=== Retirements ===
- Darya Astakhova
- (Belgium) Sofia Costoulas (illness)
- (Ukraine) Oleksandra Oliynykova
- (Thailand) Mananchaya Sawangkaew (right wrist injury)

== Doubles entrants ==
=== Seeds ===
Country	Player	Country	Player	Rank	Seed
HKG	Eudice Chong	JPN	Eri Hozumi	121	1
TPE	Cho I-hsuan	TPE	Cho Yi-tsen	188	2
JPN	Momoko Kobori	JPN	Ayano Shimizu	212	3
GBR	Madeleine Brooks		Ekaterina Ovcharenko	255	4

- Rankings as of 28 September 2026.

=== Other entrants ===
The following pair received a wildcard into the doubles main draw:

- (China) Qu Yihan / (China) Shao Yushan

=== Withdrawals ===
Before the tournament

- (China) Ma Yexin / (Thailand) Mananchaya Sawangkaew → replaced by (China) Shi Han / (China) Yao Xinxin

During the tournament

- (Hong Kong) Eudice Chong / (Japan) Eri Hozumi (right wrist injury)

== Champions ==
=== Singles ===
- (Slovakia) Rebecca Šramková def. (Japan) Kyōka Okamura 6–3, 6–1

=== Doubles ===
- (Chinese Taipei) Li Yu-yun / (China) Zhang Ying def. Tatiana Prozorova / Aliaksandra Sasnovich 6–3, 6–0
