= 2025 Al Habtoor Tennis Challenge – Doubles =

Doubles
- 2025 Al Habtoor Tennis Challenge

Final
- Champions: (China) Gao Xinyu (Thailand) Mananchaya Sawangkaew
- Runners-up: Rada Zolotareva; Vera Zvonareva
- Score: 4–6, 7–5, [10–7]

Events
Singles	Doubles
- Al Habtoor Tennis Challenge

Anastasia Dețiuc and Anastasia Tikhonova were the defending champions, but Dețiuc did not participate and Tikhonova chose to compete in Quito instead.

Gao Xinyu and Mananchaya Sawangkaew won the title, defeating Rada Zolotareva and Vera Zvonareva in the final; 4–6, 7–5, [10–7].

== Seeds ==
1. (Slovenia) Dalila Jakupović / (France) Kristina Mladenovic (first round)
2. (United Kingdom) Emily Appleton / (India) Prarthana Thombare (quarterfinals)
3. (India) Rutuja Bhosale / (United Kingdom) Freya Christie (first round)
4. Ekaterina Ovcharenko / (United Kingdom) Emily Webley-Smith (first round)

== Draw ==
Key

- Q = Qualifier
- WC = Wild card
- LL = Lucky loser
- Alt = Alternate
- ITF = ITF entry
- PR = Protected ranking
- SR = Special ranking
- SE = Special exempt
- JE = Junior exempt
- JR = Junior Accelerator Programme entrant
- CO = College Accelerator Programme entrant
- NG = Next Gen Accelerator Program entrant
- w/o = Walkover
- r = Retired
- d = Defaulted

=== Draw ===
First round
1	(Slovenia) D Jakupović (France) K Mladenovic	6^{6}	2
(United Kingdom) H Dart (Australia) Ar Rodionova	7^{8}	6
A Anshba (Czech Republic) M Bayerlová	1	5
(Australia) O Gadecki (United Kingdom) M Stojsavljevic	6	7
3	(India) R Bhosale (United Kingdom) F Christie	2	3
(Austria) S Kraus (Netherlands) A Rus	6	6
(China) X Gao (Thailand) M Sawangkaew	6	6
WC	(Turkey) İ Öz (Croatia) I Primorac Pavičić	2	3
(Spain) G García Pérez (Switzerland) V Ryser	3	2
WC	(India) S Bhamidipaty (India) A Raina	6	6
E Pridankina; E Yashina	6	6
4	E Ovcharenko (United Kingdom) E Webley-Smith	3	2
Alt	R Zolotareva; V Zvonareva	6	7^{7}
WC	V Panshina; D Zelinskaya	1	6^{3}
A Ibragimova; K Zaytseva	7^{9}	6^{3}	[5]
2	(United Kingdom) E Appleton (India) P Thombare	6^{7}	7^{7}	[10]

Quarterfinals
(United Kingdom) H Dart (Australia) Ar Rodionova	6^{7}	1
(Australia) O Gadecki (United Kingdom) M Stojsavljevic	7^{9}	6
(Austria) S Kraus (Netherlands) A Rus	0	4
(China) X Gao (Thailand) M Sawangkaew	6	6
WC	(India) S Bhamidipaty (India) A Raina	4	6	[10]
E Pridankina; E Yashina	6	4	[8]
Alt	R Zolotareva; V Zvonareva	6	7^{7}
2	(United Kingdom) E Appleton (India) P Thombare	4	6^{2}

Semifinals
(Australia) O Gadecki (United Kingdom) M Stojsavljevic	4	5
(China) X Gao (Thailand) M Sawangkaew	6	7
WC	(India) S Bhamidipaty (India) A Raina	6	5	[3]
Alt	R Zolotareva; V Zvonareva	3	7	[10]

Final
(China) X Gao (Thailand) M Sawangkaew	4	7	[10]
Alt	R Zolotareva; V Zvonareva	6	5	[7]
