= 2025 Huzhou Open – Doubles =

Doubles
- 2025 Huzhou Open

Final
- Champions: (Slovenia) Veronika Erjavec (Kazakhstan) Zhibek Kulambayeva
- Runners-up: (Japan) Momoko Kobori (Japan) Ayano Shimizu
- Score: 6–4, 6–2

Events
Singles	Doubles
Huzhou Open	· 2026 →

This was the first edition of the tournament.

Veronika Erjavec and Zhibek Kulambayeva won the title, after defeating Momoko Kobori and Ayano Shimizu 6–4, 6–2 in the final.

== Seeds ==
1. (Chinese Taipei) Cho I-hsuan / (Chinese Taipei) Cho Yi-tsen (semifinals)
2. (Slovenia) Veronika Erjavec / (Kazakhstan) Zhibek Kulambayeva (champions)
3. (France) Estelle Cascino / (China) Feng Shuo (semifinals)
4. (Japan) Momoko Kobori / (Japan) Ayano Shimizu (final)

== Draw ==
=== Key ===
- Q = Qualifier
- WC = Wild card
- LL = Lucky loser
- Alt = Alternate
- ITF = ITF entry
- PR = Protected ranking
- SR = Special ranking
- SE = Special exempt
- JE = Junior exempt
- JR = Junior Accelerator Programme entrant
- CO = College Accelerator Programme entrant
- NG = Next Gen Accelerator Program entrant
- w/o = Walkover
- r = Retired
- d = Defaulted

=== Draw ===
First round
1	(Chinese Taipei) I-h Cho (Chinese Taipei) Y-t Cho	6	7^{7}
(China) M Wang (China) C Yuan	3	6^{3}
(China) Y Ma (China) S Wei	6	6^{5}	[8]
(China) Z Li (China) H Shi	3	7^{7}	[10]
4	(Japan) M Kobori (Japan) A Shimizu	6	6
(South Korea) N-r Kim (China) Q Ye	3	3
(Thailand) P Plipuech (China) W Zheng	6	3	[10]
(Italy) D Cherubini (Italy) J Pieri	3	6	[5]
(China) Y Dang (China) Y Yang	6^{3}	4
(Chinese Taipei) Y-y Li (China) X Yao	7^{7}	6
(China) Z Xiao (China) R Zou	0	2
3	(France) E Cascino (China) S Feng	6	6
(India) R Bhatia (France) C Monnet	7	7^{7}
(United States) H Chang (China) X You	5	6^{3}
(Hong Kong) E Chong (Chinese Taipei) E-s Liang	6^{4}	4
2	(Slovenia) V Erjavec (Kazakhstan) Z Kulambayeva	7^{7}	6

Quarterfinals
1	(Chinese Taipei) I-h Cho (Chinese Taipei) Y-t Cho	7^{7}	7^{7}
(China) Z Li (China) H Shi	6^{3}	6^{3}
4	(Japan) M Kobori (Japan) A Shimizu	6	6
(Thailand) P Plipuech (China) W Zheng	2	3
(Chinese Taipei) Y-y Li (China) X Yao	4	5
3	(France) E Cascino (China) S Feng	6	7
(India) R Bhatia (France) C Monnet	1	6	[6]
2	(Slovenia) V Erjavec (Kazakhstan) Z Kulambayeva	6	2	[10]

Semifinals
1	(Chinese Taipei) I-h Cho (Chinese Taipei) Y-t Cho	1	6	[7]
4	(Japan) M Kobori (Japan) A Shimizu	6	3	[10]
3	(France) E Cascino (China) S Feng	6^{3}	1
2	(Slovenia) V Erjavec (Kazakhstan) Z Kulambayeva	7^{7}	6

Final
4	(Japan) M Kobori (Japan) A Shimizu	4	2
2	(Slovenia) V Erjavec (Kazakhstan) Z Kulambayeva	6	6
