= 2025 Huzhou Open =

Tennis tournament

- Date: 8–14 September 2025
- Edition: 1st
- Category: WTA 125
- Prize money: $115,000
- Surface: Clay
- Location: Huzhou, China

Champions

Singles
- (Slovenia) Veronika Erjavec

Doubles
- (Slovenia) Veronika Erjavec / (Kazakhstan) Zhibek Kulambayeva
- Huzhou Open

The 2025 WTA 125 Huzhou Open was a professional tennis tournament played on outdoor clay courts. It was the first edition of the tournament and part of the 2025 WTA 125 tournaments. It took place in Huzhou, China between 8 and 14 September 2025.

== Singles main-draw entrants ==
=== Seeds ===
Country	Player	Rank^{1}	Seed
ARG	María Lourdes Carlé	125	1
TPE	Joanna Garland	136	2
SLO	Veronika Erjavec	138	3
~~CHN~~	~~Gao Xinyu~~	~~142~~	~~4~~
THA	Lanlana Tararudee	154	5
JPN	Mai Hontama	180	6
CHN	Wei Sijia	189	7
	Maria Timofeeva	191	8
	Alina Charaeva	194	9

- ^{1} Rankings are as of 25 August 2025.

=== Other entrants ===
The following players received wildcards into the singles main draw:

- (China) Lu Jiajing
- (China) Wang Meiling
- (China) Yang Yidi
- (China) You Xiaodi

The following players received entry from the qualifying draw:

- (United States) Hanna Chang
- (Italy) Diletta Cherubini
- (Kazakhstan) Zhibek Kulambayeva
- (Italy) Jessica Pieri

The following player received entry as a lucky loser:

- (Chinese Taipei) Liang En-shuo

=== Withdrawals ===
Before the tournament

- (China) Gao Xinyu → replaced by (Chinese Taipei) Liang En-shuo

== Doubles entrants ==
=== Seeds ===
Country	Player	Country	Player	Rank	Seed
TPE	Cho I-hsuan	TPE	Cho Yi-tsen	236	1
SLO	Veronika Erjavec	KAZ	Zhibek Kulambayeva	242	2
FRA	Estelle Cascino	CHN	Feng Shuo	248	3
JPN	Momoko Kobori	JPN	Ayano Shimizu	250	4

- Rankings as of 25 August 2025.

== Champions ==
=== Singles ===
- (Slovenia) Veronika Erjavec def. Alina Charaeva 6–2, 6–1

=== Doubles ===
- (Slovenia) Veronika Erjavec / (Kazakhstan) Zhibek Kulambayeva def. (Japan) Momoko Kobori / (Japan) Ayano Shimizu 6–4, 6–2
