= 2026 Quito Open =

- Date: 30 November–6 December 2026
- Edition: 2nd
- Category: WTA 125
- Prize money: $115,000
- Surface: Clay
- Location: Quito, Ecuador

2025 Champions

Singles
- (Slovenia) Polona Hercog

Doubles
- (Ukraine) Valeriya Strakhova / Anastasia Tikhonova
- Quito Open

The 2026 Quito Open is an upcoming professional women's tennis tournament to be played on outdoor clay courts. It will be the second edition of the tournament and part of the 2026 WTA 125 tournaments. It will take place at the Quito Tennis and Golf Club (El Condado), in Quito, Ecuador between 30 November and 6 December 2026.

== Singles main draw entrants ==
=== Seeds ===
Country	Player	Rank^{1}	Seed
GER	Tatjana Maria	67	1
CZE	Laura Samson	110	2
ARG	Julia Riera	138	3
ESP	Guiomar Maristany	147	4
LAT	Darja Semeņistaja	174	5
BEL	Sofia Costoulas	176	6
ARG	Nadia Podoroska	181	7
SLO	Polona Hercog	185	8

- ^{1} Rankings as of 23 November 2026.

=== Other entrants ===
The following players received a wildcard into the singles main draw:

- (Canada) Bianca Fernandez
- (Ecuador) Mell Reasco González
- (Ecuador) Camila Romero

The following players received entry from the qualifying draw:

=== Withdrawals ===
Before the tournament

- (Armenia) Elina Avanesyan → replaced by (Kazakhstan) Zhibek Kulambayeva
- (Argentina) Luisina Giovannini → replaced by (Poland) Gina Feistel
- (Morocco) Yasmine Kabbaj → replaced by Daria Egorova
- (Poland) Magda Linette → replaced by (United States) Lea Ma
- (Argentina) Jazmín Ortenzi → replaced by (Italy) Martina Trevisan
- (United States) Malaika Rapolu → replaced by (Brazil) Carolina Alves

== Doubles entrants ==
=== Seeds ===
Country	Player	Country	Player	Rank^{1}	Seed
KAZ	Zhibek Kulambayeva	UKR	Valeriya Strakhova	178	1
BRA	Laura Pigossi	LAT	Darja Semeņistaja	279	2

- Rankings as of 23 November 2026.

=== Other entrants ===
The following pair received a wildcard into the doubles main draw:

- (Ecuador) / (Ecuador)
