= 2026 Huzhou Open – Doubles =

Doubles
- 2026 Huzhou Open

Final
- Champions: Sofya Lansere; Anastasia Zolotareva
- Runners-up: (Japan) Hiroko Kuwata (Chinese Taipei) Li Yu-yun
- Score: 6–4, 6–1

Events
Singles	Doubles
- Huzhou Open

Veronika Erjavec and Zhibek Kulambayeva were the reigning champions, but Erjavec did not participate this year. Kulambayeva partnered Ekaterina Reyngold, but they withdrew from their first round match against Dang Yiming and You Xiaodi.

Sofya Lansere and Anastasia Zolotareva won the title, defeating Hiroko Kuwata and Li Yu-yun 6–4, 6–1 in the final.

== Seeds ==
1. (Thailand) Peangtarn Plipuech / (China) Zheng Wushuang (first round)
2. (Hong Kong) Eudice Chong / (Hong Kong) Cody Wong (quarterfinals)
3. (Japan) Hiroko Kuwata / (Chinese Taipei) Li Yu-yun (final)
4. Alevtina Ibragimova / (Slovenia) Dalila Jakupović (first round)

== Draw ==
Key

- Q = Qualifier
- WC = Wild card
- LL = Lucky loser
- Alt = Alternate
- ITF = ITF entry
- PR = Protected ranking
- SR = Special ranking
- SE = Special exempt
- JE = Junior exempt
- JR = Junior Accelerator Programme entrant
- CO = College Accelerator Programme entrant
- NG = Next Gen Accelerator Program entrant
- w/o = Walkover
- r = Retired
- d = Defaulted

=== Draw ===
First round
1	(Thailand) P Plipuech (China) W Zheng	2	5
S Lansere; A Zolotareva	6	7
(China) Y Dang (China) X You	w/o
(Kazakhstan) Z Kulambayeva; E Reyngold
4	A Ibragimova (Slovenia) D Jakupović	6	6^{4}	[10]
(China) H Shi (China) Q Ye	4	7^{7}	[12]
(China) Y Huang (China) Y Ma	3	4
(China) M Wang (China) C Yuan	6	6
(China) M Guo (United States) A Zhu	4	6	[12]
V Panshina; R Zolotareva	6	3	[10]
(Japan) S Saito (Japan) I Yamazaki	4	3
3	(Japan) H Kuwata (Chinese Taipei) Y-y Li	6	6
(Lithuania) J Mikulskytė (Greece) D Papamichail	6	7
(South Korea) N-r Kim (China) Jia Wang	2	5
(New Zealand) M Barry (Australia) A Osborne	6	4	[9]
2	(Hong Kong) E Chong (Hong Kong) C Wong	2	6	[11]

Quarterfinals
S Lansere; A Zolotareva	5	6	[10]
(China) Y Dang (China) X You	7	3	[8]
(China) H Shi (China) Q Ye	6	6
(China) M Wang (China) C Yuan	2	1
(China) M Guo (United States) A Zhu	6^{9}	7	[5]
3	(Japan) H Kuwata (Chinese Taipei) Y-y Li	7^{11}	5	[10]
(Lithuania) J Mikulskytė (Greece) D Papamichail	6	6
2	(Hong Kong) E Chong (Hong Kong) C Wong	4	4

Semifinals
S Lansere; A Zolotareva	6	7^{7}
(China) H Shi (China) Q Ye	1	6^{5}
3	(Japan) H Kuwata (Chinese Taipei) Y-y Li	w/o
(Lithuania) J Mikulskytė (Greece) D Papamichail

Final
S Lansere; A Zolotareva	6	6
3	(Japan) H Kuwata (Chinese Taipei) Y-y Li	4	1
