= 2025 Al Habtoor Tennis Challenge =

Tennis tournament in Dubai, UAE

- Date: 1–7 December 2025
- Edition: 28th
- Category: ITF Women's World Tennis Tour
- Prize money: $100,000
- Surface: Hard
- Location: Dubai, United Arab Emirates
- Venue: Al Habtoor Grand Resort, Autograph Collection

Champions

Singles
- (Croatia) Petra Marčinko

Doubles
- (China) Gao Xinyu / (Thailand) Mananchaya Sawangkaew
- Al Habtoor Tennis Challenge

The 2025 Al Habtoor Tennis Challenge is a professional tennis tournament played on outdoor hard courts. It is the twenty-eighth edition of the tournament which is part of the 2025 ITF Women's World Tennis Tour. The tournament will take place in Dubai, United Arab Emirates, from 1 to 7 December 2025.

== Champions ==
=== Singles ===
- (Croatia) Petra Marčinko def. Vera Zvonareva, 6–3, 6–3.

=== Doubles ===
- (China) Gao Xinyu / (Thailand) Mananchaya Sawangkaew def. Rada Zolotareva / Vera Zvonareva, 4–6, 7–5, [10–7].

== Singles main draw entrants ==
=== Seeds ===
Country	Player	Rank^{1}	Seed
HUN	Dalma Gálfi	96	1
	Anastasia Zakharova	104	2
AUT	Sinja Kraus	106	3
CRO	Petra Marčinko	114	4
POL	Katarzyna Kawa	121	5
CZE	Linda Fruhvirtová	136	6
NED	Arantxa Rus	139	7
UKR	Daria Snigur	159	8

- ^{1} Rankings are as of 24 November 2025.

=== Other entrants ===
The following players received wildcards into the singles main draw:

- (United Kingdom) Freya Christie
- (France) Kristina Mladenovic
- (Czech Republic) Vendula Valdmannová
- Vera Zvonareva

The following player received entry into the singles main draw as a special exempt:

- Alevtina Ibragimova

The following players received entry from the qualifying draw:

- (Japan) Mai Hontama
- Sofya Lansere
- (Czech Republic) Tereza Martincová
- (Switzerland) Valentina Ryser
- (Japan) Sara Saito
- (United Kingdom) Mika Stojsavljevic
- (Germany) Caroline Werner
- (Japan) Mei Yamaguchi
