= 2025 Al Habtoor Tennis Challenge – Singles =

Singles
- 2025 Al Habtoor Tennis Challenge

Final
- Champion: (Croatia) Petra Marčinko
- Runner-up: Vera Zvonareva
- Score: 6–3, 6–3

Events
Singles	Doubles
← 2024 ·	Al Habtoor Tennis Challenge	· 2026 →

Jodie Burrage was the defending champion but chose not to participate.

Petra Marčinko won the title, defeating Vera Zvonareva in the final; 6–3, 6–3.

== Seeds ==
1. (Hungary) Dalma Gálfi (first round, retired)
2. Anastasia Zakharova (first round)
3. (Austria) Sinja Kraus (second round)
4. (Croatia) Petra Marčinko (champion)
5. (Poland) Katarzyna Kawa (first round)
6. (Czech Republic) Linda Fruhvirtová (second round)
7. (Netherlands) Arantxa Rus (quarterfinals, retired)
8. (Ukraine) Daria Snigur (first round)

== Draw ==
Key

- Q = Qualifier
- WC = Wild card
- LL = Lucky loser
- Alt = Alternate
- ITF = ITF entry
- PR = Protected ranking
- SR = Special ranking
- SE = Special exempt
- JE = Junior exempt
- JR = Junior Accelerator Programme entrant
- CO = College Accelerator Programme entrant
- NG = Next Gen Accelerator Program entrant
- w/o = Walkover
- r = Retired
- d = Defaulted

=== Finals ===
Semifinals
WC	Vera Zvonareva	6	6^{4}	6
Q	(United Kingdom) Mika Stojsavljevic	3	7^{7}	4
4	(Croatia) Petra Marčinko	4	6	6
(China) Gao Xinyu	6	3	0

Final
WC	Vera Zvonareva	3	3
4	(Croatia) Petra Marčinko	6	6

=== Top half ===
First round
1	(Hungary) D Gálfi	3	1^{r}
Q	(Czech Republic) T Martincová	6	2
(Croatia) T Würth	3	4
WC	V Zvonareva	6	6
Q	S Lansere	7	6
(Australia) O Gadecki	5	2
(Thailand) M Sawangkaew	1	6	6
8	(Ukraine) D Snigur	6	4	4
3	(Austria) S Kraus	6	6
Q	(Japan) S Saito	3	4
Q	(United Kingdom) M Stojsavljevic	6	6
Q	(Switzerland) V Ryser	4	3
WC	(United Kingdom) F Christie	0	2
P Iatcenko	6	6
WC	(Czech Republic) V Valdmannová	6	6
5	(Poland) K Kawa	2	2

Second round
Q	(Czech Republic) T Martincová	1	2
WC	V Zvonareva	6	6
Q	S Lansere	6	6
(Thailand) M Sawangkaew	3	3
3	(Austria) S Kraus	6	1	3
Q	(United Kingdom) M Stojsavljevic	4	6	6
P Iatcenko	6
WC	(Czech Republic) V Valdmannová	6^{r}

Quarterfinals
WC	V Zvonareva	7	2	6
Q	S Lansere	5	6	3
Q	(United Kingdom) M Stojsavljevic	6	4	7^{7}
P Iatcenko	3	6	6^{4}

Semifinals
WC	V Zvonareva	6	6^{4}	6
Q	(United Kingdom) M Stojsavljevic	3	7^{7}	4

=== Bottom half ===
First round
7	(Netherlands) A Rus	6	6
(Australia) Ar Rodionova	3	4
(Netherlands) A Hartono	6	6
Q	(Japan) M Yamaguchi	2	1
Q	(Japan) M Hontama	1	1
(United Kingdom) H Dart	6	6
(Slovakia) V Hrunčáková	4	1
4	(Croatia) P Marčinko	6	6
6	(Czech Republic) L Fruhvirtová	6	7
(Lithuania) J Mikulskytė	0	5
SE	A Ibragimova	6	6
WC	(France) K Mladenovic	3	2
Q	(Germany) C Werner	3	6	1
(China) X Gao	6	3	6
E Pridankina	7	7^{7}
2	A Zakharova	5	6^{5}

Second round
7	(Netherlands) A Rus	6	6
(Netherlands) A Hartono	1	2
(United Kingdom) H Dart	1	6	1
4	(Croatia) P Marčinko	6	3	6
6	(Czech Republic) L Fruhvirtová	4	3
SE	A Ibragimova	6	6
(China) X Gao	7^{8}	6
E Pridankina	6^{6}	2

Quarterfinals
7	(Netherlands) A Rus	6^{5}	0^{r}
4	(Croatia) P Marčinko	7^{7}	1
SE	A Ibragimova	6^{4}	2
(China) X Gao	7^{7}	6

Semifinals
4	(Croatia) P Marčinko	4	6	6
(China) X Gao	6	3	0
