= 2026 Suzhou Open – Doubles =

Doubles
- 2026 Suzhou Open

Final
- Champions: (Chinese Taipei) Li Yu-yun (China) Zhang Ying
- Runners-up: Tatiana Prozorova; Aliaksandra Sasnovich
- Score: 6–3, 6–0

Events
Singles	Doubles
- Suzhou Ladies Open

Aldila Sutjiadi and Janice Tjen were the defending champions, but both chose to compete in Beijing instead.

Li Yu-yun and Zhang Ying won the title, defeating Tatiana Prozorova and Aliaksandra Sasnovich 6–3, 6–0 in the final.

== Seeds ==
1. (Hong Kong) Eudice Chong / (Japan) Eri Hozumi (quarterfinals, withdrew)
2. (Chinese Taipei) Cho I-hsuan / (Chinese Taipei) Cho Yi-tsen (first round)
3. (Japan) Momoko Kobori / (Japan) Ayano Shimizu (quarterfinals)
4. (United Kingdom) Madeleine Brooks / Ekaterina Ovcharenko (semifinals)

== Draw ==
Key

- Q = Qualifier
- WC = Wild card
- LL = Lucky loser
- Alt = Alternate
- ITF = ITF entry
- PR = Protected ranking
- SR = Special ranking
- SE = Special exempt
- JE = Junior exempt
- JR = Junior Accelerator Programme entrant
- CO = College Accelerator Programme entrant
- NG = Next Gen Accelerator Program entrant
- w/o = Walkover
- r = Retired
- d = Defaulted

=== Draw ===
First round
1	(Hong Kong) E Chong (Japan) E Hozumi	7	6
A Ibragimova (Brazil) I Martins	5	4
(Chinese Taipei) Y-y Li (China) Y Zhang	6	6
WC	(China) Y Qu (China) Y Shao	3	2
4	(United Kingdom) M Brooks; E Ovcharenko	7^{7}	3	[10]
(Chinese Taipei) Y-h Lee (Hong Kong) C Wong	6^{5}	6	[8]
(Japan) H Kuwata (China) Q Ye	6	6^{5}	[10]
Alt	(China) H Shi (China) X Yao	2	7^{7}	[4]
T Prozorova; A Sasnovich	2	6	[10]
(China) Y Dang (China) X You	6	2	[5]
(China) Y Huang (Thailand) P Plipuech	6	3	[5]
3	(Japan) M Kobori (Japan) A Shimizu	3	6	[10]
(China) Z Li (China) W Zheng	6	6
(Japan) M Ayukawa (United Kingdom) E Webley-Smith	1	2
(Germany) T Korpatsch (Austria) L Tagger	6	0	[10]
2	(Chinese Taipei) I-h Cho (Chinese Taipei) Y-t Cho	2	6	[6]

Quarterfinals
1	(Hong Kong) E Chong (Japan) E Hozumi
(Chinese Taipei) Y-y Li (China) Y Zhang	w/o
4	(United Kingdom) M Brooks; E Ovcharenko	6	6
(Japan) H Kuwata (China) Q Ye	4	1
T Prozorova; A Sasnovich	6^{6}	6	[12]
3	(Japan) M Kobori (Japan) A Shimizu	7^{8}	4	[10]
(China) Z Li (China) W Zheng	7^{7}	6^{5}	[10]
(Germany) T Korpatsch (Austria) L Tagger	6^{5}	7^{7}	[7]

Semifinals
(Chinese Taipei) Y-y Li (China) Y Zhang	5	6	[10]
4	(United Kingdom) M Brooks; E Ovcharenko	7	3	[8]
T Prozorova; A Sasnovich	1	6	[10]
(China) Z Li (China) W Zheng	6	4	[7]

Final
(Chinese Taipei) Y-y Li (China) Y Zhang	6	6
T Prozorova; A Sasnovich	3	0
