= 2025 Huzhou Open – Singles =

Singles
- 2025 Huzhou Open

Final
- Champion: (Slovenia) Veronika Erjavec
- Runner-up: Alina Charaeva
- Score: 6–2, 6–1

Events
Singles	Doubles
- Huzhou Open

This was the first edition of the tournament.

Veronika Erjavec won the title, after defeating Alina Charaeva 6–2, 6–1 in the final.

== Seeds ==
1. (Argentina) María Lourdes Carlé (second round)
2. (Chinese Taipei) Joanna Garland (second round)
3. (Slovenia) Veronika Erjavec (champion)
4. (China) Gao Xinyu (withdrew)
5. (Thailand) Lanlana Tararudee (second round)
6. (Japan) Mai Hontama (quarterfinals)
7. (China) Wei Sijia (second round, retired)
8. Maria Timofeeva (second round)
9. Alina Charaeva (final)

== Draw ==
Key

- Q = Qualifier
- WC = Wild card
- LL = Lucky loser
- Alt = Alternate
- ITF = ITF entry
- PR = Protected ranking
- SR = Special ranking
- SE = Special exempt
- JE = Junior exempt
- JR = Junior Accelerator Programme entrant
- CO = College Accelerator Programme entrant
- NG = Next Gen Accelerator Program entrant
- w/o = Walkover
- r = Retired
- d = Defaulted

=== Finals ===
Semifinals
Anastasia Gasanova	0	2
3	(Slovenia) Veronika Erjavec	6	6
9	Alina Charaeva	6	6
(France) Carole Monnet	2	1

Final
3	(Slovenia) Veronika Erjavec	6	6
9	Alina Charaeva	2	1

=== Top half ===
First round
1	(Argentina) ML Carlé	6	6
WC	(China) Y Yang	2	4
(China) W Zheng	1	6^{6}
Q	(Italy) J Pieri	6	7^{8}
WC	(China) X You	3	3
A Gasanova	6	6
WC	(China) Jia Lu	6	3	2
5	(Thailand) L Tararudee	3	6	6
3	(Slovenia) V Erjavec	6	6
Q	(United States) H Chang	2	4
(Japan) S Saito	4	5
(France) C Paquet	6	7
(Japan) A Shimizu	1	3
(Japan) K Okamura	6	6
(Canada) C Zhao	3	3
7	(China) S Wei	6	6

Second round
1	(Argentina) ML Carlé	6	2	2
Q	(Italy) J Pieri	4	6	6
A Gasanova	6	6
5	(Thailand) L Tararudee	3	4
3	(Slovenia) V Erjavec	7^{7}	6
(France) C Paquet	6^{4}	3
(Japan) K Okamura	3	7	4
7	(China) S Wei	6	5	2^{r}

Quarterfinals
Q	(Italy) J Pieri	6^{6}	2
A Gasanova	7^{8}	6
3	(Slovenia) V Erjavec	6	6
(Japan) K Okamura	0	2

Semifinals
A Gasanova	0	2
3	(Slovenia) V Erjavec	6	6

=== Bottom half ===
First round
6	(Japan) M Hontama	6	6
WC	(China) M Wang	4	1
(China) H Shi	2	4
(China) X Yao	6	6
Q	(Italy) D Cherubini	7	6
(Cyprus) R Șerban	5	1
LL	(Chinese Taipei) E-s Liang	2	6	4
9	A Charaeva	6	2	6
8	M Timofeeva	6	6
(South Korea) S-h Park	4	2
(China) Y Ma	1	0
(Germany) A-L Friedsam	6	6
(France) C Monnet	2	6	6
(Kazakhstan) Z Diyas	6	4	1
Q	(Kazakhstan) Z Kulambayeva	4	1
2	(Chinese Taipei) J Garland	6	6

Second round
6	(Japan) M Hontama	7^{7}	7
(China) X Yao	6^{3}	5
Q	(Italy) D Cherubini	4	6	1
9	A Charaeva	6	0	6
8	M Timofeeva	6	6^{7}	6^{2}
(Germany) A-L Friedsam	2	7^{9}	7^{7}
(France) C Monnet	6	6
2	(Chinese Taipei) J Garland	2	2

Quarterfinals
6	(Japan) M Hontama	6^{2}	4
9	A Charaeva	7^{7}	6
(Germany) A-L Friedsam	3	6	6^{4}
(France) C Monnet	6	1	7^{7}

Semifinals
9	A Charaeva	6	6
(France) C Monnet	2	1

== Qualifying ==
=== Seeds ===
1. (United States) Hanna Chang (qualified)
2. (Chinese Taipei) Liang En-shuo (qualifying competition, lucky loser)
3. (Kazakhstan) Zhibek Kulambayeva (qualified)
4. (Italy) Jessica Pieri (qualified)
5. (Japan) Momoko Kobori (first round)
6. (Italy) Diletta Cherubini (qualified)
7. Daria Kudashova (qualifying competition)
8. Ekaterina Reyngold (qualifying competition)

=== Qualifiers ===
1. (United States) Hanna Chang
2. (Italy) Diletta Cherubini
3. (Kazakhstan) Zhibek Kulambayeva
4. (Italy) Jessica Pieri

=== Lucky loser ===
1. (Chinese Taipei) Liang En-shuo

=== Qualifying draw ===
==== First qualifier ====
First round
1	(United States) Hanna Chang	5	6	6
(China) Guo Meiqi	7	3	3
(China) Li Zongyu	6	2	2
8	Ekaterina Reyngold	4	6	6

Qualifying competition
1	(United States) Hanna Chang	6	6
8	Ekaterina Reyngold	2	3

==== Second qualifier ====
First round
2	(Chinese Taipei) Liang En-shuo	7	6
(India) Riya Bhatia	5	2
(Japan) Yuki Naito	3	2
6	(Italy) Diletta Cherubini	6	6

Qualifying competition
2	(Chinese Taipei) Liang En-shuo	3	2
6	(Italy) Diletta Cherubini	6	6

==== Third qualifier ====
First round
3	(Kazakhstan) Zhibek Kulambayeva	6	6
WC	(China) Xu Guyu	0	0
(South Korea) Jang Su-jeong	6	3	6
5	(Japan) Momoko Kobori	3	6	3

Qualifying competition
3	(Kazakhstan) Zhibek Kulambayeva	6	6
(South Korea) Jang Su-jeong	3	3

==== Fourth qualifier ====
First round
4	(Italy) Jessica Pieri	6	7^{7}
(Hong Kong) Eudice Chong	0	6^{5}
WC	(China) Yuan Chengyiyi	3	2
7	Daria Kudashova	6	6

Qualifying competition
4	(Italy) Jessica Pieri	6	6
7	Daria Kudashova	2	2
