= 2025 Quito Open =

- Date: 1–7 December 2025
- Edition: 1st
- Category: WTA 125
- Prize money: $115,000
- Surface: Clay
- Location: Quito, Ecuador

Champions

Singles
- (Slovenia) Polona Hercog

Doubles
- (Ukraine) Valeriya Strakhova / Anastasia Tikhonova
- Quito Open

The 2025 Copa Banco Guayaquil WTA 125 de Quito was the first edition of the Quito Open, a professional WTA 125 tournament held on outdoor clay at the Quito Tennis and Golf Club, in Quito, Ecuador. It was part of the 2025 WTA 125 tournaments.

It took place between 1 and 7 December, 2025. This was the first time a WTA event took place in Ecuador.

== Singles main draw entrants ==
=== Seeds ===
Country	Player	Rank^{1}	Seed
GER	Tatjana Maria	41	1
UKR	Oleksandra Oliynykova	95	2
FRA	Léolia Jeanjean	100	3
HUN	Panna Udvardy	107	4
SLO	Veronika Erjavec	113	5
POL	Maja Chwalińska	128	6
USA	Varvara Lepchenko	157	7
GRE	Despina Papamichail	173	8

- ^{1} Rankings as of 24 November 2025.

=== Other entrants ===
The following players received a wildcard into the singles main draw:

- (Germany) Tatjana Maria
- (Colombia) Valentina Mediorreal
- (Ecuador) Mell Reasco González
- (Colombia) Valentina Vargas

The following player received entry into the singles main draw through protected ranking:

- (Slovenia) Polona Hercog

The following players received entry from the qualifying draw:

- (Italy) Diletta Cherubini
- (Italy) Martina Colmegna
- (Ukraine) Valeriya Strakhova
- Anastasia Zolotareva

The following player received entry as a lucky loser:

- (Ecuador) Tania Varela-Alvarado

=== Withdrawals ===
Before the tournament

- (Czech Republic) Sára Bejlek → replaced by (Ecuador) Tania Varela-Alvarado (LL)
- (United States) Caroline Dolehide → replaced by (United States) Ayana Akli
- (France) Carole Monnet → replaced by (Spain) Alicia Herrero Liñana
- (Italy) Jessica Pieri → replaced by (Spain) Irene Burillo
- (Argentina) Julia Riera → replaced by (Ecuador) Camila Romero
- (Egypt) Mayar Sherif → replaced by (Czech Republic) Laura Samson

== Doubles entrants ==
=== Seeds ===
Country	Player	Country	Player	Rank^{1}	Seed
ESP	Alicia Herrero Liñana	BRA	Laura Pigossi	199	1
UKR	Valeriya Strakhova		Anastasia Tikhonova	225	2

- Rankings as of 24 November 2025.

=== Other entrants ===
The following pair received a wildcard into the doubles main draw:

- (Ecuador) Marie Elise Casares / (Ecuador) Tania Varela-Alvarado

== Champions ==
=== Singles ===
- (Slovenia) Polona Hercog def. (Argentina) Luisina Giovannini 6–2, 6–1

=== Doubles ===
- (Ukraine) Valeriya Strakhova / Anastasia Tikhonova def. (Spain) Irene Burillo / Anastasia Zolotareva 6–4, 6–1
