= 2026 Suzhou Open – Singles =

Singles
- 2026 Suzhou Open

Final
- Champion: (Slovakia) Rebecca Šramková
- Runner-up: (Japan) Kyōka Okamura
- Score: 6–3, 6–1

Details
- Draw: 32 (4Q / 4WC)
- Seeds: 8

Events
Singles	Doubles
- Suzhou Ladies Open

Rebecca Šramková won the title, after defeating Kyōka Okamura 6–3, 6–1 in the final.

Viktorija Golubic was the reigning champion, but chose to compete in Beijing instead.

== Seeds ==
1. (Ukraine) Oleksandra Oliynykova (second round, retired)
2. (Germany) Tamara Korpatsch (second round)
3. (Kazakhstan) Yulia Putintseva (withdrew)
4. (Czech Republic) Darja Vidmanova (first round)
5. (Thailand) Mananchaya Sawangkaew (first round, retired)
6. (Mexico) Renata Zarazúa (semifinals)
7. (United States) Claire Liu (second round)
8. (Japan) Moyuka Uchijima (first round)

== Draw ==
Key

- Q = Qualifier
- WC = Wild card
- LL = Lucky loser
- Alt = Alternate
- ITF = ITF entry
- PR = Protected ranking
- SR = Special ranking
- SE = Special exempt
- JE = Junior exempt
- JR = Junior Accelerator Programme entrant
- CO = College Accelerator Programme entrant
- NG = Next Gen Accelerator Program entrant
- w/o = Walkover
- r = Retired
- d = Defaulted

=== Finals ===
Semifinals
(Slovakia) Rebecca Šramková	7	6
6	(Mexico) Renata Zarazúa	5	3
Q	(Japan) Kyōka Okamura	6	7^{7}
(United States) Elvina Kalieva	1	6^{1}

Final
(Slovakia) Rebecca Šramková	6	6
Q	(Japan) Kyōka Okamura	3	1

=== Top half ===
First round
1	(Ukraine) O Oliynykova	6	6
Q	(China) W Zheng	0	4
(China) H Guo	6^{4}	6	5
A Falei	7^{7}	4	7
A Ibragimova	2	3
(Slovakia) R Šramková	6	6
(France) E Jacquemot	1	1
7	(United States) C Liu	6	6
LL	(Ukraine) K Zavatska	7^{7}	6
WC	(China) Y Shao	6^{5}	4
Q	D Khamutsianskaya	6	5	7
(Italy) TC Grant	2	7	5
(Belgium) S Costoulas	3	0^{r}
D Astakhova	6	0
Q	(China) H Shi	3	3
6	(Mexico) R Zarazúa	6	6

Second round
1	(Ukraine) O Oliynykova	6^{6}	0^{r}
A Falei	7^{8}	4
(Slovakia) R Šramková	7	6
7	(United States) C Liu	5	4
LL	(Ukraine) K Zavatska	6	6
Q	D Khamutsianskaya	4	4
D Astakhova	0^{r}
6	(Mexico) R Zarazúa	4

Quarterfinals
A Falei	1	6	2
(Slovakia) R Šramková	6	2	6
LL	(Ukraine) K Zavatska	1	6^{9}
6	(Mexico) R Zarazúa	6	7^{11}

Semifinals
(Slovakia) R Šramková	7	6
6	(Mexico) R Zarazúa	5	3

=== Bottom half ===
First round
8	(Japan) M Uchijima	6	3	3
WC	(China) Z Bai	4	6	6
(Australia) E Jones	6	6
(Japan) M Hontama	4	0
WC	(China) R Zhang	4	6	2
T Prozorova	6	3	6
Q	(Japan) K Okamura	6	6^{6}	6
4	(Czech Republic) D Vidmanova	2	7^{8}	1
5	(Thailand) M Sawangkaew	2	0^{r}
(Czech Republic) L Fruhvirtová	6	2
WC	(China) X Yao	5	1
A Sasnovich	7	6
(United States) E Kalieva	6	6
(China) Y Ma	3	4
LL	(China) Jia Lu	2	5
2	(Germany) T Korpatsch	6	7

Second round
WC	(China) Z Bai	1	6	7^{7}
(Australia) E Jones	6	3	6^{3}
T Prozorova	4	6	6^{5}
Q	(Japan) K Okamura	6	3	7^{7}
(Czech Republic) L Fruhvirtová	0	2
A Sasnovich	6	6
(United States) E Kalieva	2	6	6
2	(Germany) T Korpatsch	6	1	4

Quarterfinals
WC	(China) Z Bai	1	6^{3}
Q	(Japan) K Okamura	6	7^{7}
A Sasnovich	3	6^{8}
(United States) E Kalieva	6	7^{10}

Semifinals
Q	(Japan) K Okamura	6	7^{7}
(United States) E Kalieva	1	6^{1}

== Qualifying ==
=== Seeds ===
1. Darya Astakhova (moved to main draw)
2. (China) Shi Han (qualified)
3. (Ukraine) Katarina Zavatska (qualifying competition, lucky loser)
4. Sofya Lansere (withdrew, still competing in Jingshan)
5. (Japan) Rina Saigo (first round)
6. Darya Khamutsianskaya (qualified)
7. (Japan) Kyōka Okamura (qualified)
8. (China) Li Zongyu (first round)

=== Qualifiers ===
1. (Japan) Kyōka Okamura
2. (China) Shi Han
3. Darya Khamutsianskaya
4. (China) Zheng Wushuang

=== Lucky losers ===
1. (China) Lu Jiajing
2. (Ukraine) Katarina Zavatska

=== Draw ===
==== First qualifier ====
First round
Alt	(Japan) Rinko Matsuda	2	2
(China) Wei Sijia	6	6
(Indonesia) Priska Nugroho	3	6^{5}
7	(Japan) Kyōka Okamura	6	7^{7}

Qualifying competition
(China) Wei Sijia	3	2
7	(Japan) Kyōka Okamura	6	6

==== Second qualifier ====
First round
2	(China) Shi Han	3	6	6
(China) Yuan Chengyiyi	6	4	4
(China) Yang Yidi	6	6
5	(Japan) Rina Saigo	3	3

Qualifying competition
2	(China) Shi Han	6	7^{7}
(China) Yang Yidi	4	6^{5}

==== Third qualifier ====
First round
3	(Ukraine) Katarina Zavatska	6	6
Kristiana Sidorova	4	1
(China) Huang Yujia	6	4	6^{4}
6	Darya Khamutsianskaya	4	6	7^{7}

Qualifying competition
3	(Ukraine) Katarina Zavatska	4	1
6	Darya Khamutsianskaya	6	6

==== Fourth qualifier ====
First round
Alt	(China) Zheng Wushuang	4	6	6
WC	(China) Qu Yihan	6	3	4
(China) Lu Jiajing	6	5	7
8	(China) Li Zongyu	1	7	5

Qualifying competition
Alt	(China) Zheng Wushuang	3	7^{7}	6
(China) Lu Jiajing	6	6^{4}	3
