= 2025 Quito Open – Singles =

Singles
- 2025 Quito Open

Final
- Champion: (Slovenia) Polona Hercog
- Runner-up: (Argentina) Luisina Giovannini
- Score: 6–2, 6–1

Details
- Draw: 32 (4Q / 4WC)
- Seeds: 8

Events
Singles	Doubles
- Quito Open

Polona Hercog won the title, defeating Luisina Giovannini in the final, 6–2, 6–1. Ranked No. 672, Hercog became the lowest-ranked winner of a WTA 125 title.

This was the first edition of the tournament.

== Seeds ==
1. (Germany) Tatjana Maria (second round, withdrew)
2. (Ukraine) Oleksandra Oliynykova (second round)
3. (France) Léolia Jeanjean (semifinals)
4. (Hungary) Panna Udvardy (quarterfinals)
5. (Slovenia) Veronika Erjavec (quarterfinals)
6. (Poland) Maja Chwalińska (second round)
7. (United States) Varvara Lepchenko (second round)
8. (Greece) Despina Papamichail (semifinals)

== Draw ==
Key

- Q = Qualifier
- WC = Wild card
- LL = Lucky loser
- Alt = Alternate
- ITF = ITF entry
- PR = Protected ranking
- SR = Special ranking
- SE = Special exempt
- JE = Junior exempt
- JR = Junior Accelerator Programme entrant
- CO = College Accelerator Programme entrant
- NG = Next Gen Accelerator Program entrant
- w/o = Walkover
- r = Retired
- d = Defaulted

=== Finals ===
Semifinals
(Argentina) Luisina Giovannini	6	6
8	(Greece) Despina Papamichail	4	2
3	(France) Léolia Jeanjean	2	2
PR	(Slovenia) Polona Hercog	6	6

Final
(Argentina) Luisina Giovannini	2	1
PR	(Slovenia) Polona Hercog	6	6

=== Top half ===
First round
1/WC	(Germany) T Maria	6	6^{6}	6
(Spain) I Burillo	1	7^{8}	4
WC	(Ecuador) M Reasco González	3	7	7
Q	(Ukraine) V Strakhova	6	5	5
(Argentina) L Giovannini	3	6	6
WC	(Colombia) V Mediorreal	6	2	3
LL	(Ecuador) T Varela-Alvarado	0	0
6	(Poland) M Chwalińska	6	6
4	(Hungary) P Udvardy	7^{7}	6
Q	(Italy) D Cherubini	6^{3}	2
(Czech Republic) L Samson	3	6	6
(Argentina) J Ortenzi	6	4	1
(Ecuador) C Romero	6	4	2
Q	A Zolotareva	3	6	6
(Spain) A Herrero Liñana	6^{5}	6	3
8	(Greece) D Papamichail	7^{7}	1	6

Second round
1/WC	(Germany) T Maria
WC	(Ecuador) M Reasco González	w/o
(Argentina) L Giovannini	6	6
6	(Poland) M Chwalińska	3	4
4	(Hungary) P Udvardy	6	7^{7}
(Czech Republic) L Samson	1	6^{3}
Q	A Zolotareva	6^{4}	5
8	(Greece) D Papamichail	7^{7}	7

Quarterfinals
WC	(Ecuador) M Reasco González	3	5
(Argentina) L Giovannini	6	7
4	(Hungary) P Udvardy	4	5
8	(Greece) D Papamichail	6	7

Semifinals
(Argentina) L Giovannini	6	6
8	(Greece) D Papamichail	4	2

=== Bottom half ===
First round
5	(Slovenia) V Erjavec	6	6
A Tikhonova	4	2
(United States) A Akli	4	6	3
(Brazil) L Pigossi	6	1	6
(Burundi) S Nahimana	6	6
WC	(Colombia) V Vargas	3	2
(Netherlands) E Vedder	1	2
3	(France) L Jeanjean	6	6
7	(United States) V Lepchenko	7^{8}	6^{6}	6
(Brazil) C Alves	6^{6}	7^{8}	2
(United States) E Kalieva	6	6
(Romania) M Bulgaru	3	3
(Spain) S Sorribes Tormo	6^{0}	6	3
PR	(Slovenia) P Hercog	7^{7}	4	6
Q	(Italy) M Colmegna	3	6	3
2	(Ukraine) O Oliynykova	6	3	6

Second round
5	(Slovenia) V Erjavec	7	6
(Brazil) L Pigossi	5	2
(Burundi) S Nahimana	3	3
3	(France) L Jeanjean	6	6
7	(United States) V Lepchenko	4	2
(United States) E Kalieva	6	6
PR	(Slovenia) P Hercog	4	6	6
2	(Ukraine) O Oliynykova	6	3	3

Quarterfinals
5	(Slovenia) V Erjavec	3	0
3	(France) L Jeanjean	6	6
(United States) E Kalieva	3	1
PR	(Slovenia) P Hercog	6	6

Semifinals
3	(France) L Jeanjean	2	2
PR	(Slovenia) P Hercog	6	6

== Qualifying ==
=== Seeds ===
1. Anastasia Zolotareva (qualified)
2. (Ukraine) Valeriya Strakhova (qualified)
3. (Italy) Diletta Cherubini (qualified)
4. (Italy) Martina Colmegna (qualified)

=== Qualifiers ===
1. Anastasia Zolotareva
2. (Ukraine) Valeriya Strakhova
3. (Italy) Diletta Cherubini
4. (Italy) Martina Colmegna

=== Lucky loser ===
1. (Ecuador) Tania Varela-Alvarado

=== Qualifying draw ===
==== First qualifier ====
Qualifying competition
1	Anastasia Zolotareva	6	6
WC	(Ecuador) Alejandra Álvarez	0	0

==== Second qualifier ====
Qualifying competition
2	(Ukraine) Valeriya Strakhova	6	6
WC	(Ecuador) Tania Varela-Alvarado	0	2

==== Third qualifier ====
Qualifying competition
3	(Italy) Diletta Cherubini	6	6
WC	(Ecuador) Monica Gallegos	0	0

==== Fourth qualifier ====
Qualifying competition
4	(Italy) Martina Colmegna	7^{7}	6
WC	(Ecuador) Marie Elise Casares	6^{2}	3
