= Copa Banco Guayaquil =

Quito Open
- 2025 Quito Open

WTA 125
- Event name: Copa Banco Guayaquil WTA 125 de Quito
- Location: Quito, Ecuador
- Venue: Quito Tennis and Golf Club
- Category: WTA 125
- Surface: Clay
- Draw: 32S/8Q/8D

Current champions (2025)
- Singles: (Slovenia) Polona Hercog
- Doubles: (Ukraine) Valeriya Strakhova; Anastasia Tikhonova

The Quito Open, known as the Copa Banco Guayaquil WTA 125 de Quito, is a tournament for professional female tennis players played on outdoor clay courts. The event is classified as a WTA 125 tournament and is held at the Quito Tennis and Golf Club in Quito, Ecuador.

== Past finals ==
=== Singles ===
Year	Champion	Runners-up	Score
2025	(Slovenia) Polona Hercog	(Argentina) Luisina Giovannini	6–2, 6–1

=== Doubles ===
Year	Champions	Runners-up	Score
2025	(Ukraine) Valeriya Strakhova; Anastasia Tikhonova	(Spain) Irene Burillo; Anastasia Zolotareva	6–4, 6–1
