= Zhang Ying (tennis) =

Chinese tennis player (born 1996)

Zhang Ying 张莹
- Country (sports): China
- Born: 15 April 1996 (age 30)
- Height: 1.90 m (6 ft 3 in)
- Plays: Right (two-handed backhand)
- Prize money: $116,300

Singles
- Career record: 214–212
- Career titles: 3 ITF
- Highest ranking: No. 356 (6 March 2017)
- Current ranking: No. 576 (13 July 2026)

Doubles
- Career record: 201–152
- Career titles: 1 WTA 125, 15 ITF
- Highest ranking: No. 178 (15 June 2026)
- Current ranking: No. 182 (13 July 2026)
- Last updated on: 14 July 2026.

Zhang Ying (Chinese: 张莹; pinyin: Zhāng Yíng; Mandarin pronunciation: [ʈʂáŋ ǐŋ]; born 15 April 1996) is a professional Chinese tennis player.

On 6 March 2017, she reached her highest WTA singles ranking of 356. On 15 June 2026, Zhang peaked at No. 178 in the WTA doubles rankings. She has won three singles and 15 doubles titles at tournaments of the ITF Women's Circuit.

Zhang made her WTA Tour main-draw debut at the 2015 Guangzhou International Open, in the doubles competition partnering Ankita Raina.

Partnering with Li Yu-yun, she won her first WTA 125 doubles title at the 2026 Suzhou Open, defeating Tatiana Prozorova and Aliaksandra Sasnovich in the final.

== WTA 125 finals ==
=== Doubles: 1 (1 title) ===
Result	W–L	Date	Tournament	Surface	Partner	Opponents	Score
Win	1–0	Oct 2026	Suzhou Ladies Open, China	Hard	(Chinese Taipei) Li Yu-yun	Tatiana Prozorova; Aliaksandra Sasnovich	6–3, 6–0

== ITF Circuit finals ==
=== Singles: 5 (3 titles, 2 runner-ups) ===
Legend W35 tournaments W15 tournaments	Finals by surface Hard (2–2) Clay (1–0)

Result	W–L	Date	Tournament	Tier	Surface	Opponent	Score
Win	1–0	Jun 2016	ITF Kaohsiung, Taiwan	10k	Hard	(Japan) Erina Hayashi	6–0, 7–6^{(5)}
Win	2–0	Mar 2019	ITF Nanchang, China	W15	Clay (i)	(South Korea) Kim Da-bin	3–6, 6–2, 7–5
Loss	2–1	Jun 2024	ITF Monastir, Tunisia	W15	Hard	(Cyprus) Daria Frayman	3–6, 1–6
Loss	2–2	Sep 2024	ITF Singapore	W15	Hard	Elina Nepliy	6–2, 5–7, 3–6
Win	3–2	Jul 2025	ITF Lu'an, China	W15	Hard	(South Korea) Choi On-yu	7–5, 6–3

=== Doubles: 31 (15 titles, 16 runner-ups) ===
Legend W100 tournaments W75 tournaments W50 tournaments W25/35 tournaments W10/15 tournaments	Finals by surface Hard (14–15) Clay (1–1)

Result	W–L	Date	Tournament	Tier	Surface	Partner	Opponents	Score
Loss	0–1	Apr 2014	ITF Antalya, Turkey	10k	Hard	(China) Zheng Wushuang	(Japan) Kotomi Takahata (United States) Tina Tehrani	1–6, 3–6
Win	1–1	Jun 2015	ITF Anning, China	10k	Clay	(China) Gao Xinyu	(China) Li Yihong (China) Tang Qianhui	6–4, 6–2
Win	2–1	Mar 2016	ITF Nanjing, China	10k	Hard	(Chinese Taipei) Lee Pei-chi	(China) Xun Fangying (China) Zhao Di	6–2, 7–5
Loss	2–2	Jul 2016	ITF Hong Kong, China SAR	10k	Hard	(China) Gai Ao	(Japan) Nagi Hanatani (Australia) Alana Parnaby	4–6, 6–4, [11–13]
Loss	2–3	Dec 2016	ITF Hong Kong	10k	Hard	(China) Xun Fangying	(Japan) Mai Minokoshi (South Korea) Park Sang-hee	6–4, 4–6, [7–10]
Win	3–3	Feb 2017	ITF Nanjing	15k	Hard	(China) Li Yihong	(China) Guo Hanyu (China) Tang Haochen	5–7, 6–3, [10–3]
Win	4–3	May 2017	ITF Hua Hin, Thailand	15k	Hard	(China) Chen Jiahui	(Oman) Fatma Al-Nabhani (Japan) Chihiro Muramatsu	6–4, 6–1
Loss	4–4	May 2018	ITF Wuhan, China	25k	Hard	(China) Guo Hanyu	(Japan) Mai Minokoshi (Japan) Erika Sema	4–6, 1–6
Loss	4–5	Jun 2018	ITF Changsha, China	25k	Hard	(China) Han Xinyun	(China) Feng Shuo (China) Jiang Xinyu	3–6, 6–4, [9–11]
Loss	4–6	Sep 2018	ITF Yeongwol, Korea	15k	Hard	(United States) Hanna Chang	(Japan) Erina Hayashi (Japan) Chisa Hosonuma	1–6, 1–6
Win	5–6	Jan 2019	ITF Monastir, Tunisia	W15	Hard	(Turkey) İpek Soylu	(Spain) Claudia Hoste Ferrer (Bulgaria) Julia Terziyska	6–3, 6–3
Loss	5–7	Mar 2019	ITF Xiamen, China	W15	Hard	(China) Tang Qianhui	(China) Sun Xuliu (China) Zhao Qianqian	4–6, 4–6
Loss	5–8	Apr 2019	ITF Antalya, Turkey	W15	Clay	(Kyrgyzstan) Ksenia Palkina	(Switzerland) Jenny Dürst (Switzerland) Chiara Grimm	w/o
Win	6–8	Jun 2019	ITF Hengyang, China	W25	Hard	(China) You Xiaodi	(China) Sun Xuliu (China) Zhao Qiangian	6–1, 6–0
Loss	6–9	Jan 2020	ITF Hong Kong	W25	Hard	(Japan) Moyuka Uchijima	(Hong Kong) Eudice Chong (Chinese Taipei) Wu Fang-hsien	6–7^{(2)}, 1–6
Loss	6–10	May 2024	ITF Monastir, Tunisia	W15	Hard	(Japan) Natsuho Arakawa	(South Korea) Back Da-yeon (Colombia) María Herazo González	4–6, 4–6
Loss	6–11	May 2024	ITF Monastir, Tunisia	W15	Hard	(China) Xu Jiayu	(United Kingdom) Ella McDonald (United Kingdom) Talia Neilson-Gatenby	4–6, 2–6
Win	7–11	Aug 2024	ITF Xiamen, China	W15	Hard	(China) Huang Yujia	(China) Lu Jingjing (China) Xun Fangying	6–2, 7–5
Loss	7–12	Oct 2024	ITF Qiandaohu, China	W35	Hard	(China) Xun Fangying	Sofya Lansere; Ekaterina Shalimova	6–4, 4–6, [5–10]
Loss	7–13	Jun 2025	ITF Sapporo, Japan	W15	Hard	(South Korea) Choi On-yu	(Japan) Kanna Soeda (Japan) Maiko Uchijima	7–6^{(2)}, 1–6, [8–10]
Win	8–13	Jun 2025	ITF Hong Kong	W15	Hard	(Hong Kong) Shek Cheuk Ying	(South Korea) Jeong Bo-young (China) Tian Fangran	6–1, 6–1
Win	9–13	Jul 2025	ITF Lu'an, China	W15	Hard	(China) Huang Yujia	(China) Sun Yifan (China) Zhao Xichen	6–4, 6–3
Loss	9–14	Sep 2025	ITF Guiyang, China	W50	Hard	(China) Tian Fangran	Varvara Panshina; Daria Zelinskaya	2–6, 4–6
Win	10–14	Oct 2025	ITF Huzhou, China	W35	Hard	(China) Huang Yujia	(United States) Kristina Penickova; Rada Zolotareva	6–2, 6–4
Loss	10–15	Jan 2026	ITF Monastir, Tunisia	W15	Hard	(China) Huang Yujia	(France) Marie Villet; Milana Zhabrailova	2–6, 4–6
Win	11–15	Feb 2026	Queensland International, Australia	W75	Hard	(Japan) Hayu Kinoshita	(Australia) Petra Hule (Australia) Elena Micic	7–6^{(5)}, 7–5
Win	12–15	Apr 2026	ITF Luzhou, China	W35	Hard	(China) Zheng Wushuang	(Chinese Taipei) Lee Ya-hsin (China) Li Zongyu	2–6, 6–4, [12–10]
Win	13–15	May 2026	ITF Wuning, China	W35	Hard	(China) Huang Yujia	(Australia) Monique Barry (China) Yuan Chengyiyi	3–6, 6–2, [10–7]
Win	14–15	Jun 2026	ITF Wuning, China	W50	Hard	(Chinese Taipei) Li Yu-yun	(China) Huang Yujia (China) Zheng Wushuang	4–6, 6–0, [10–2]
Win	15–15	Jun 2026	Wuning Open, China	W100	Hard	(Chinese Taipei) Li Yu-yun	(Japan) Hiromi Abe (Thailand) Peangtarn Plipuech	6–3, 6–2
Loss	15–16	Aug 2026	ITF Tianjin, China	W75	Hard	(Chinese Taipei) Li Yu-yun	(Japan) Momoko Kobori (Japan) Ayano Shimizu	0–6, 6–4, [8–10]
