= 2025 Quito Open – Doubles =

Doubles
- 2025 Quito Open

Final
- Champions: (Ukraine) Valeriya Strakhova; Anastasia Tikhonova
- Runners-up: (Spain) Irene Burillo; Anastasia Zolotareva
- Score: 6–4, 6–1

Events
Singles	Doubles
Quito Open	· 2026 →

Valeriya Strakhova and Anastasia Tikhonova won the title, defeating Irene Burillo and Anastasia Zolotareva in the final, 6–4, 6–1.

This was the first edition of the tournament.

== Seeds ==
1. (Spain) Alicia Herrero Liñana / (Brazil) Laura Pigossi (quarterfinals)
2. (Ukraine) Valeriya Strakhova / Anastasia Tikhonova (champions)

== Draw ==
Key

- Q = Qualifier
- WC = Wild card
- LL = Lucky loser
- Alt = Alternate
- ITF = ITF entry
- PR = Protected ranking
- SR = Special ranking
- SE = Special exempt
- JE = Junior exempt
- JR = Junior Accelerator Programme entrant
- CO = College Accelerator Programme entrant
- NG = Next Gen Accelerator Program entrant
- w/o = Walkover
- r = Retired
- d = Defaulted

=== Draw ===
Quarterfinals
1	(Spain) A Herrero Liñana (Brazil) L Pigossi	6^{5}	6^{3}
(Ecuador) M Reasco González (Ecuador) C Romero	7^{7}	7^{7}
(Spain) I Burillo; A Zolotareva	6	7
(Colombia) V Mediorreal (Ecuador) V Vargas	3	5
WC	(Ecuador) ME Casares (Ecuador) T Varela-Alvarado	0	3
(United States) A Akli (Argentina) N Fossa Huergo	6	6
(United States) V Lepchenko (Czech Republic) L Samson	2	1
2	(Ukraine) V Strakhova; A Tikhonova	6	6

Semifinals
(Ecuador) M Reasco González (Ecuador) C Romero	6	3	[6]
(Spain) I Burillo; A Zolotareva	3	6	[10]
(United States) A Akli (Argentina) N Fossa Huergo	6^{4}	3
2	(Ukraine) V Strakhova; A Tikhonova	7^{7}	6

Final
(Spain) I Burillo; A Zolotareva	4	1
2	(Ukraine) V Strakhova; A Tikhonova	6	6
