= Huzhou Open =

Tennis tournament in China

International Women's Tennis Huzhou Open
- 2026 Huzhou Open

WTA 125
- Event name: Huzhou Open
- Location: Huzhou, China
- Venue: Huzhou International Tennis Center
- Category: WTA 125
- Surface: Clay
- Draw: 32S/16Q/16D
- Prize money: $115,000

Current champions (2026)
- Singles: (Poland) Katarzyna Kawa
- Doubles: Sofya Lansere; Anastasia Zolotareva

The WTA 125 Huzhou Open (Chinese: 湖州网球公开赛; pinyin: Húzhōu Wǎngqiú Gōngkāi Sài) is a tournament for professional female tennis players played on outdoor clay courts. The event is classified as a WTA 125 tournament and is held at the Huzhou International Tennis Center in Huzhou, China.

== Past finals ==
=== Singles ===
Year	Champion	Runners-up	Score
2026	(Poland) Katarzyna Kawa	(Slovenia) Veronika Erjavec	6–0, 6–4
2025	(Slovenia) Veronika Erjavec	Alina Charaeva	6–2, 6–1

=== Doubles ===
Year	Champions	Runners-up	Score
2026	Sofya Lansere; Anastasia Zolotareva	(Japan) Hiroko Kuwata (Chinese Taipei) Li Yu-yun	6–4, 6–1
2025	(Slovenia) Veronika Erjavec (Kazakhstan) Zhibek Kulambayeva	(Japan) Momoko Kobori (Japan) Ayano Shimizu	6–4, 6–2
