= Tatiana Prozorova =

Russian tennis player (born 2003)

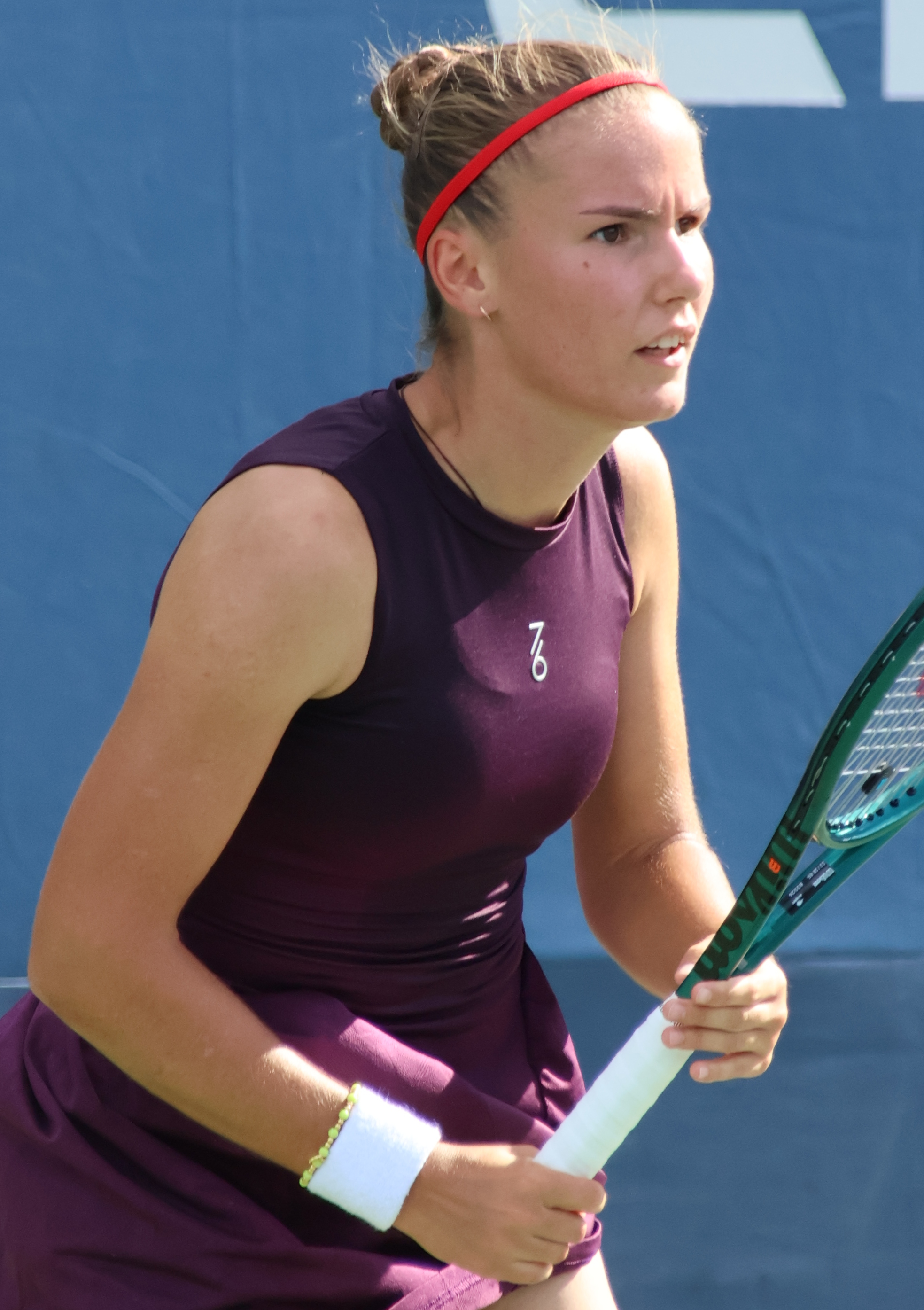
- Prozorova at the 2026 US Open
- Native name: Татьяна Прозорова
- Country (sports): Russia
- Born: 10 October 2003 (age 23)
- Plays: Right (two-handed backhand)
- Prize money: $526,155

Singles
- Career record: 183–104
- Career titles: 8 ITF
- Highest ranking: No. 117 (12 October 2026)
- Current ranking: No. 117 (12 October 2026)

Grand Slam singles results
- Australian Open: Q2 (2026)
- French Open: Q1 (2025, 2026)
- Wimbledon: Q2 (2026)
- US Open: 1R (2023)

Doubles
- Career record: 27–38
- Career titles: 1 ITF
- Highest ranking: No. 375 (16 September 2024)
- Current ranking: No. 419 (21 September 2026)
- Last updated on: 21 September 2026.

Tatiana Prozorova (née Barkova), Russian: Татьяна Прозорова; born 10 October 2003) is a Russian tennis player. She has a career-high singles ranking of No. 117 achieved on 12 October 2026 by the WTA and a best doubles ranking of world No. 375. Prozorova has won eight singles titles and one doubles title on the ITF Women's World Tennis Tour.

== Career ==
Prozorova made her WTA Tour main-draw debut for the 2023 Rabat Grand Prix where she received entry into the singles tournament as a qualifier, losing in three sets to eighth seed Tatjana Maria.

Prozorova qualified for her first major tournament on her debut 2023 at the US Open, but lost in the first round to former world No. 1, Caroline Wozniacki, in straight sets.

At the 2026 Singapore Open, she defeated Sofia Costoulas, before upsetting world No. 18 Alexandra Eala in the second round for her first win over a top-20 ranked player. Prozorova continued her run with a victory over Wang Xinyu to reach her first WTA Tour semifinal. However, she had to withdraw from the tournament prior to her last four match against Talia Gibson after being hit on the head during her doubles quarterfinal and subsequently failing a concussion test.

== Performance timeline ==
Key
W	F	SF	QF	#R	RR	Q#	DNQ	A	NH

(W) winner; (F) finalist; (SF) semifinalist; (QF) quarterfinalist; (#R) rounds 4, 3, 2, 1; (RR) round-robin stage; (Q#) qualification round; (DNQ) did not qualify; (A) absent; (NH) not held; (SR) strike rate (events won / competed); (W–L) win–loss record.
To avoid confusion and double counting, these charts are updated at the conclusion of a tournament or when the player's participation has ended.

Only main-draw results in WTA Tour, Grand Slam tournaments, Billie Jean King Cup, United Cup, Hopman Cup and Olympic Games are included in win–loss records.

=== Singles ===
Current through the 2025 US Open.

Tournament	2023	2024	2025	2026	SR	W–L
Grand Slam tournaments
Australian Open	A	Q1	A	Q2	0 / 0	0–0
French Open	A	A	Q1	Q1	0 / 0	0–0
Wimbledon	A	A	A	Q2	0 / 0	0–0
US Open	1R	A	Q2	Q1	0 / 1	0–1
Win–loss	0–1	0–0	0–0	0–0	0 / 1	0–1
WTA 1000 tournaments
China Open	A	A	Q1		0 / 0	0–0
Career statistics
Tournaments	3				Career total: 3	
Overall win–loss	1–3				0 / 3	1–3
Year-end ranking (Note: 2022: WTA ranking–388.)	213	262	173		$332,260	

== WTA 125 finals ==
=== Doubles: 2 (2 runner-up) ===
Result	W–L	Date	Tournament	Surface	Partner	Opponents	Score
Loss	0–1	Jul 2026	ENKA Ladies Open, Turkey	Hard	Alexandra Shubladze	(Japan) Ena Shibahara; Vera Zvonareva	3–6, 6–3, [8–10]
Loss	0–2	Oct 2026	Suzhou Ladies Open, China	Hard	Aliaksandra Sasnovich	(Chinese Taipei) Li Yu-yun (China) Zhang Ying	3–6, 0–6

== ITF Circuit finals ==
=== Singles: 14 (8 titles, 6 runner-ups) ===
Legend
W100 tournaments (1–0)
W60/75 tournaments (3–2)
W50 tournaments (1–0)
W25/35 tournaments (1–3)
W15 tournaments (2–1)

Result	W–L	Date	Tournament	Tier	Surface	Opponent	Score
Loss	0–1	Dec 2021	ITF Giza, Egypt	W15	Hard	(Egypt) Lamis Alhussein Abdel Aziz	4–6, 5–7
Win	1–1	Apr 2022	ITF Shymkent, Kazakhstan	W15	Clay	(Kazakhstan) Zhibek Kulambayeva	6–2, 6–4
Win	2–1	May 2022	ITF Antalya, Turkey	W15	Clay	(Italy) Federica Bilardo	7–6^{(4)}, 7–5
Loss	2–2	Aug 2022	ITF Ust-Kamenogorsk, Kazakhstan	W25	Hard	(Belarus) Anna Kubareva	4–6, 6–7^{(6)}
Loss	2–3	Oct 2022	ITF İstanbul, Turkey	W25	Hard	(Russia) Polina Kudermetova	3–6, 1–6
Loss	2–4	Oct 2022	ITF Sharm El Sheikh, Egypt	W25	Hard	(Serbia) Nina Stojanović	6–7^{(10)}, 7–5, 1–6
Win	3–4	Jun 2023	Open Madrid, Spain	W60	Hard	(Spain) Marta Soriano Santiago	6–3, 6–1
Win	4–4	Jul 2024	President's Cup, Kazakhstan	W35	Hard	(Russia) Alexandra Shubladze	7–5, 6–7^{(5)}, 6–1
Win	5–4	Sep 2024	Incheon Open, South Korea	W100	Hard	(China) Gao Xinyu	6–3, 6–0
Win	6–4	Jan 2025	ITF New Delhi, India	W50	Hard	(Hungary) Panna Udvardy	4–6, 7–6^{(6)}, 6–4
Win	7–4	Feb 2025	Pune Championships, India	W75	Hard	(France) Léolia Jeanjean	4–6, 7–5, 6–3
Loss	7–5	May 2025	Open Saint-Gaudens, France	W75	Clay	(France) Loïs Boisson	6–7^{(4)}, 0–6
Loss	7–6	Feb 2026	ITF Pune, India	W75	Hard	(Belgium) Hanne Vandewinkel	6–7^{(0)}, 6–7^{(5)}
Win	8–6	Mar 2026	Branik Maribor Open, Slovenia	W75	Hard	(Belgium) Hanne Vandewinkel	6–3, 6–3

=== Doubles: 3 (1 title, 2 runner-ups) ===
Legend
W80 tournaments
W60 tournaments
W15 tournaments

Result	W–L	Date	Tournament	Tier	Surface	Partner	Opponents	Score
Loss	0–1	Nov 2021	ITF Helsingborg, Sweden	W15	Hard (i)	(Hungary) Natália Szabanin	(Germany) Anna Klasen (Germany) Phillippa Preugschat	6–1, 3–6, [9–11]
Loss	0–2	Oct 2023	Rancho Santa Fe Open, US	W60	Hard	(United States) Madison Sieg	(United States) Makenna Jones (Ukraine) Yulia Starodubtseva	3–6, 6–4, [6–10]
Win	1–2	Oct 2023	Tennis Classic of Macon, US	W80	Hard	(Belarus) Jana Kolodynska	(United States) Sofia Sewing (Russia) Anastasia Tikhonova	6–3, 6–2
