= Li Yu-yun =

Taiwanese tennis player (born 2004)

- Country (sports): Chinese Taipei
- Born: 31 May 2004 (age 22) Taiwan
- Plays: Right (two-handed backhand)
- Prize money: $38,854

Singles
- Career record: 37–57
- Highest ranking: No. 1035 (27 May 2024)

Doubles
- Career record: 142–70
- Career titles: 1 WTA 125, 17 ITF
- Highest ranking: No. 161 (4 May 2026)
- Current ranking: No. 161 (4 May 2026)

Team competitions
- Fed Cup: 3–1
Medal record
Representing Chinese Taipei
World University Games
Silver medal – second place	2025 Rhine-Ruhr	Doubles
- Last updated on: 13 May 2026.

Li Yu-yun (Chinese: 李羽芸; born 31 May 2004) is a Taiwanese tennis player who specialises in doubles.

She has a career-high WTA doubles ranking of 161, achieved on 4 May 2026.

Playing for Chinese Taipei Billie Jean King Cup team, Li Yu-yun has a win–loss record of 3–1.

Partnering Haley Giavara, she won her first W50 tournament in May 2024 at the Kunming Open in China.

== Career highlights ==
=== Juniors ===
Li reached a career-high combined junior ranking of 37 on 31 October 2022. In the doubles final of the J1 College Park tournament in August 2022, she and her Japanese partner Sara Saito defeated Anastasiia Gureva from Russia and Carolina Kuhl from Germany, 6–4, 6–2. The season's latest Grade A event in October, the Osaka Mayor's Cup, concluded on Sunday partnering with Sara Saito as girls’ doubles champions, respectively.

=== Professional ===
Li achieved better results in doubles tennis. She won five championships in total in 2022, four of which were in Antalya.

In 2023, she won the championship in tournaments in Malaysia and Japan. In June 2023, she won the title with her Belgian partner Sofia Costoulas in the Tainan tournament held in her home country.

Partnering with Zhang Ying, Li won her first WTA 125 doubles title at the 2026 Suzhou Open, defeating Tatiana Prozorova and Aliaksandra Sasnovich in the final.

== WTA 125 finals ==
=== Doubles: 3 (1 title, 2 runner-ups) ===
Result	W–L	Date	Tournament	Surface	Partner	Opponents	Score
Loss	0–1	Sep 2025	Changsha Open, China	Hard	(China) Yao Xinxin	(Hong Kong) Eudice Chong (Chinese Taipei) Liang En-shuo	5–7, 3–6
Loss	0–2	Apr 2026	Huzhou Open, China	Clay	(Japan) Hiroko Kuwata	(Russia) Sofya Lansere (Russia) Anastasia Zolotareva	4–6, 1–6
Win	1–2	Oct 2026	Suzhou Ladies Open, China	Hard	(China) Zhang Ying	Tatiana Prozorova; Aliaksandra Sasnovich	6–3, 6–0

== ITF Circuit finals ==
=== Doubles: 28 (20 titles, 8 runner-ups) ===
Legend
W100 tournaments
W75 tournaments
W50 tournaments
W25/35 tournaments
W15 tournaments

Result	W–L	Date	Tournament	Tier	Surface	Partner	Opponents	Score
Win	1–0	Jun 2022	ITF Čatež ob Savi, Slovenia	W15	Clay	(Russia) Anna Zyryanova	(Slovakia) Bianca Behúlová (Slovakia) Katarina Kuzmová	6–4, 7–5
Win	2–0	Nov 2022	ITF Antalya, Turkey	W15	Clay	(Kazakhstan) Aruzhan Sagandikova	(Russia) Anastasia Zolotareva; Rada Zolotareva	7–5, 3–6, [10–4]
Win	3–0	Nov 2022	ITF Antalya, Turkey	W15	Clay	(Japan) Koharu Niimi	(Japan) Mayuka Aikawa (Belgium) Amelie van Impe	6–1, 6–2
Win	4–0	Nov 2022	ITF Antalya, Turkey	W15	Clay	(Belgium) Amelie Van Impe	(Russia) Daria Lodikova (Turkey) Melis Ayda Uyar	6–2, 5–7, [10–3]
Win	5–0	Dec 2022	ITF Antalya, Turkey	W15	Clay	(Russia) Anna Zyryanova	(Russia) Ksenia Laskutova (Russia) Aleksandra Pospelova	3–6, 6–4, [10–7]
Win	6–0	Feb 2023	ITF Ipoh, Malaysia	W15	Hard	(Ukraine) Anastasiia Poplavska	(China) Feng Shuo (China) Guo Hanyu	7–5, 6–2
Win	7–0	Feb 2023	ITF Kuala Lumpur, Malaysia	W15	Hard	(China) Guo Hanyu	(Thailand) Anchisa Chanta (Japan) Ayaka Okuno	6–0, 2–6, [10–2]
Win	8–0	Mar 2023	ITF Kuching, Malaysia	W15	Hard	(China) Guo Hanyu	(China) Feng Shuo (China) Guo Meiqi	6–2, 6–3
Loss	8–1	Mar 2023	ITF Hinode, Japan	W15	Hard	(Japan) Rinon Okuwaki	(Japan) Akari Inoue (Chinese Taipei) Tsao Chia-yi	4–6, 7–6^{(5)}, [5–10]
Win	9–1	Apr 2023	ITF Fukui, Japan	W15	Hard	(Japan) Rinon Okuwaki	(Japan) Erina Hayashi (Japan) Kisa Yoshioka	3–6, 6–4, [10–8]
Loss	9–2	May 2023	ITF Incheon, South Korea	W25	Hard	(China) Tang Qianhui	(South Korea) Choi Ji-hee (South Korea) Ku Yeon-woo	1–6, 1–6
Win	10–2	Jun 2023	ITF Luzhou, China	W25	Hard	(China) Tang Qianhui	(China) Feng Shuo (China) Zheng Wushuang	7–6^{(4)}, 6–2
Win	11–2	Jun 2023	ITF Tainan, Taiwan	W25	Clay	(Belgium) Sofia Costoulas	(Chinese Taipei) Lee Ya-hsin (Chinese Taipei) Lee Ya-hsuan	6–4, 6–4
Loss	11–3	Jan 2024	ITF Bangalore, India	W50	Hard	(Japan) Eri Shimizu	(Italy) Camilla Rosatello (Latvia) Darja Semeņistaja	6–3, 2–6, [8–10]
Win	12–3	May 2024	Kunming Open, China	W50	Clay	(United States) Haley Giavara	(China) Feng Shuo (South Korea) Park So-hyun	6–3, 6–1
Loss	12–4	Aug 2024	ITF Kunshan, China	W35	Hard	(China) Yao Xinxin	(Chinese Taipei) Lee Ya-hsin (Hong Kong) Cody Wong	5–7, 4–6
Win	13–4	Jan 2025	ITF Antalya, Turkey	W15	Clay	(China) Li Zongyu	(Norway) Astrid Brune Olsen (Japan) Ena Koike	6–4, 4–6, [11–9]
Win	14–4	Feb 2025	ITF Antalya, Turkey	W35	Clay	(China) Li Zongyu	(Thailand) Punnin Kovapitukted (Japan) Yuki Naito	6–3, 6–3
Win	15–4	Feb 2025	ITF Antalya, Turkey	W35	Clay	(China) Li Zongyu	(Italy) Nicole Fossa Huergo (Kazakhstan) Zhibek Kulambayeva	6–2, 2–6, [10–6]
Win	16–4	Feb 2025	ITF Antalya, Turkey	W35	Clay	(China) Li Zongyu	(Russia) Amina Anshba (Japan) Yuki Naito	6–3, 6–4
Loss	16–5	Jun 2025	ITF Taipei, Taiwan	W35	Hard	(Japan) Eri Shimizu	(South Korea) Park So-hyun (Indonesia) Janice Tjen	1–6, 5–7
Loss	16–6	Aug 2025	ITF Bistrița, Romania	W50	Clay	(Russia) Daria Lodikova	(Spain) Ángela Fita Boluda (Switzerland) Ylena In-Albon	6–7^{(5)}, 5–7
Loss	16–7	Feb 2026	Open Andrézieux-Bouthéon 42, France	W75	Hard (i)	(China) Li Zongyu	(France) Julie Belgraver (Belgium) Lara Salden	4–6, 6–3, [5–10]
Win	17–7	Feb 2026	ITF Mâcon, France	W50	Hard (i)	(China) Li Zongyu	(Italy) Enola Chiesa (France) Jenny Lim	6–3, 5–7, [10–7]
Win	18–7	Jun 2026	ITF Wuning, China	W50	Hard	(China) Zhang Ying	(China) Huang Yujia (China) Zheng Wushuang	4–6, 6–0, [10–2]
Win	19–7	Jun 2026	ITF Wuning, China	W100	Hard	(China) Zhang Ying	(Japan) Hiromi Abe (Thailand) Peangtarn Plipuech	6–3, 6–2
Loss	19–8	Aug 2026	ITF Tianjin, China	W75	Hard	(China) Zhang Ying	(Japan) Momoko Kobori (Japan) Ayano Shimizu	0–6, 6–4, [8–10]
Win	20–8	Nov 2026	Keio Challenger, Japan	W50	Hard	(Japan) Sara Saito	(South Korea) Kim Eun-chae (Japan) Kanako Morisaki	6–4, 6–2
