= Hiroko Kuwata =

Japanese tennis player (born 1990)

Hiroko Kuwata 桑田寛子
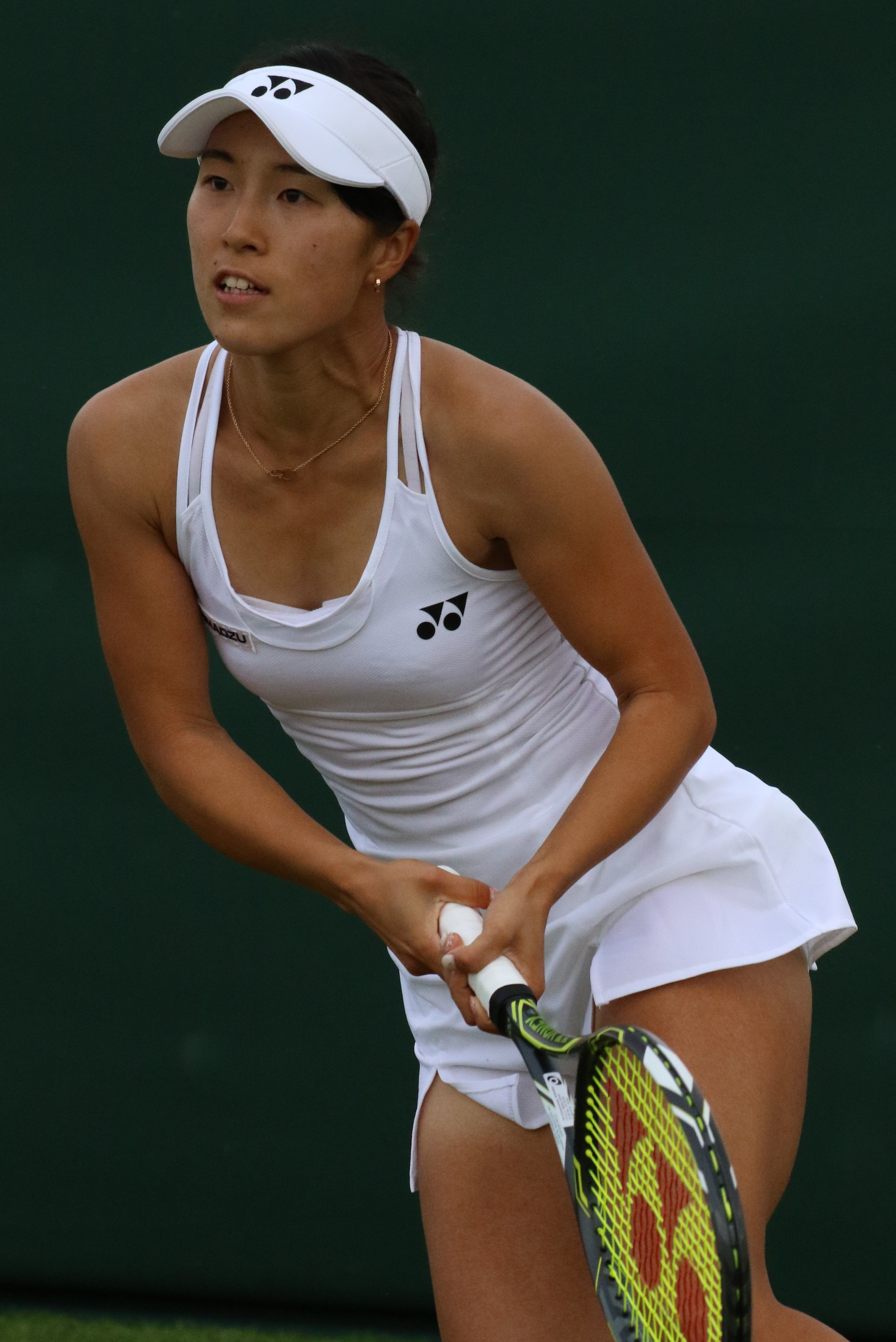
- Kuwata at 2016 Wimbledon
- Country (sports): Japan
- Born: 18 December 1990 (age 35) Yokohama, Kanagawa
- Plays: Right (two-handed backhand)
- Prize money: US$ 415,657

Singles
- Career record: 417–384
- Career titles: 7 ITF
- Highest ranking: No. 150 (9 May 2016)
- Current ranking: No. 673 (18 May 2026)

Grand Slam singles results
- Australian Open: Q2 (2016)
- French Open: Q2 (2017)
- Wimbledon: Q1 (2015)
- US Open: Q1 (2014, 2015)

Doubles
- Career record: 329–240
- Career titles: 1 WTA Challenger, 25 ITF
- Highest ranking: No. 112 (13 July 2015)
- Current ranking: No. 156 (18 May 2026)
- Last updated on: 20 May 2026.

Hiroko Kuwata (Japanese: 桑田寛子; born 18 December 1990) is a Japanese tennis player.

Kuwata has won one WTA 125 doubles title, as well as seven singles and 25 doubles titles on the ITF Women's Circuit. On 9 May 2016, she reached her best singles ranking of world No. 150. On 13 July 2015, she peaked at No. 112 in the WTA doubles rankings.

== Career ==
Kuwata made her WTA Tour debut at the 2014 Washington Open, having entered the qualifying tournament and defeating Sanaz Marand and Stéphanie Dubois for a spot in the main draw. She was thereby pitted against world No. 45, Alison Riske, and defeated the American in straight sets, losing five games in the process. It was Kuwata's first main-draw win at the WTA Tour-level. She also competed in the doubles event, partnering with Kurumi Nara to defeat Nicola Slater and Emily Webley-Smith in the first round. The Japanese advanced to the final of the event, losing to Shuko Aoyama and Gabriela Dabrowski.

Partnering with Jessica Failla, Kuwata won the doubles title at the WTA 125 2024 Barranquilla Open, defeating Quinn Gleason and Ingrid Martins in the final, in three sets.

== WTA Tour finals ==
=== Doubles: 1 (runner-up) ===
| Legend WTA 500 WTA 250 (Note: The WTA International tournaments were reclassified as WTA 250 tournaments in 2021.) (0–1) | Finals by surface Hard (0–1) Clay (0–0) |

| Result | Date | Tournament | Tier | Surface | Partner | Opponents | Score |
|---|---|---|---|---|---|---|---|
| Loss | Aug 2014 | Washington Open, United States | International | Hard | (Japan) Kurumi Nara | (Japan) Shuko Aoyama (Canada) Gabriela Dabrowski | 1–6, 2–6 |

== WTA 125 finals ==
=== Doubles: 2 (1 title, 1 runner-up) ===
| Result | W–L | Date | Tournament | Surface | Partner | Opponents | Score |
|---|---|---|---|---|---|---|---|
| Win | 1–0 | Aug 2024 | Barranquilla Open, Colombia | Hard | (United States) Jessica Failla | (United States) Quinn Gleason (Brazil) Ingrid Martins | 4–6, 7–6^{(7–2)}, [10–7] |
| Loss | 1–1 | Apr 2026 | Huzhou Open, China | Clay | (Chinese Taipei) Li Yu-yun | Sofya Lansere; Anastasia Zolotareva | 4–6, 1–6 |

== ITF Circuit finals ==
=== Singles: 18 (7 titles, 11 runner-ups) ===
| Legend W75 tournaments (1–1) W50 tournaments (0–1) W25 tournaments (1–2) W10/15 tournaments (5–7) | Finals by surface Hard (6–10) Carpet (1–1) |

| Result | W–L | Date | Tournament | Tier | Surface | Opponent | Score |
|---|---|---|---|---|---|---|---|
| Loss | 0–1 | Feb 2012 | ITF Vale do Lobo, Portugal | 10,000 | Hard | (France) Estelle Guisard | 2–6, 1–6 |
| Win | 1–1 | Mar 2012 | Kōfu International, Japan | 10,000 | Hard | (China) Liu Fangzhou | 6–4, 4–6, 7–6^{(7)} |
| Loss | 1–2 | Mar 2013 | Kōfu International, Japan | 10,000 | Hard | (Japan) Yuuki Tanaka | 3–6, 1–6 |
| Win | 2–2 | Aug 2013 | ITF Uşak, Turkey | 10,000 | Hard | (Germany) Michaela Frlicka | 7–6^{(3)}, 6–2 |
| Win | 3–2 | Sep 2013 | ITF Kyoto, Japan | 10,000 | Carpet (i) | (Japan) Akiko Yonemura | 6–1, 6–2 |
| Loss | 3–3 | Nov 2013 | Toyota World Challenge, Japan | 75,000 | Carpet (i) | (Thailand) Luksika Kumkhum | 6–3, 1–6, 3–6 |
| Loss | 3–4 | Mar 2014 | ITF Port Pirie, Australia | 15,000 | Hard | (Japan) Misa Eguchi | 1–6, 2–6 |
| Loss | 3–5 | Oct 2014 | ITF Perth, Australia | 25,000 | Hard | (Sweden) Rebecca Peterson | 3–6, 0–6 |
| Win | 4–5 | Sep 2015 | ITF Bangkok, Thailand | 15,000 | Hard | (Thailand) Bunyawi Thamchaiwat | 6–3, 7–6^{(4)} |
| Win | 5–5 | Oct 2015 | ITF Bangkok, Thailand | 15,000 | Hard | (Ukraine) Valeriya Strakhova | 7–5, 6–4 |
| Loss | 5–6 | Nov 2015 | Bendigo International, Australia | 50,000 | Hard | (Japan) Misa Eguchi | 6–7^{(5)}, 3–6 |
| Win | 6–6 | May 2016 | Kangaroo Cup, Japan | 75,000 | Hard | (China) Wang Qiang | 6–2, 2–6, 6–4 |
| Loss | 6–7 | Dec 2017 | ITF Hong Kong, China SAR | 15,000 | Hard | (Japan) Haruka Kaja | 6–4, 2–6, 6–7^{(4)} |
| Loss | 6–8 | Jan 2018 | ITF Hong Kong | 15,000 | Hard | (Chinese Taipei) Lee Ya-hsuan | 4–6, 4–6 |
| Win | 7–8 | Jun 2018 | ITF Singapore | 25,000 | Hard | (Serbia) Jovana Jakšić | 7–6, 6–0 |
| Loss | 7–9 | May 2023 | ITF Monastir, Tunisia | W15 | Hard | (Slovakia) Katarina Kužmová | 6–3, 6–7^{(4)} 3–6 |
| Loss | 7–10 | Jul 2023 | ITF Monastir, Tunisia | W15 | Hard | (France) Caroline Roméo | 3–6, 4–6 |
| Loss | 7–11 | Sep 2023 | ITF Kyoto, Japan | W25 | Hard (i) | (Russia) Sofya Lansere | 0–6, 1–6 |

=== Doubles: 51 (25 titles, 26 runner-ups) ===
| Legend W100 tournaments (0–3) 75,000 tournaments (0–2) W50/60/75 tournaments (5–7) W40/50 tournaments (1–4) W25/35 tournaments (13–7) W10/15 tournaments (6–3) | Finals by surface Hard (20–23) Clay (0–3) Grass (3–0) Carpet (2–0) |

| Result | W-L | Date | Tournament | Tier | Surface | Partner | Opponents | Score |
|---|---|---|---|---|---|---|---|---|
| Win | 1–0 | Mar 2012 | ITF Miyazaki, Japan | 10,000 | Grass | (Japan) Akari Inoue | (Japan) Kanae Hisami (Japan) Yumi Miyazaki | 6–3, 6–0 |
| Loss | 1–1 | Jun 2012 | ITF Tokyo, Japan | 10,000 | Hard | (Japan) Akari Inoue | (Japan) Maiko Inoue (Japan) Kaori Onishi | 7–5, 5–7, [7–10] |
| Win | 2–1 | Jun 2012 | ITF Mie, Japan | 10,000 | Grass | (Japan) Yuuki Tanaka | (Japan) Akari Inoue (Japan) Kaori Onishi | 6–3, 3–6, [10–5] |
| Win | 3–1 | Mar 2013 | Kōfu International, Japan | 10,000 | Hard | (Japan) Akari Inoue | (South Korea) Han Na-lae (China) Yang Zi | 3–6, 7–5, [10–7] |
| Loss | 3–2 | Aug 2013 | ITF Vienna, Austria | 10,000 | Clay | (Japan) Hirono Watanabe | (Slovakia) Michaela Pochabová (Slovakia) Rebecca Šramková | 5–7, 2–6 |
| Win | 4–2 | Sep 2013 | ITF Kyoto, Japan | 10,000 | Carpet (i) | (Japan) Miyu Kato | (Japan) Mana Ayukawa (Japan) Emi Mutaguchi | 6–4, 6–2 |
| Loss | 4–3 | Mar 2014 | ITF Port Pirie, Australia | 15,000 | Hard | (Japan) Miyabi Inoue | (Australia) Jessica Moore (Bulgaria) Aleksandrina Naydenova | 4–6, 3–6 |
| Win | 5–3 | Jun 2014 | Fergana Challenger, Uzbekistan | 25,000 | Hard | (Japan) Mari Tanaka | (Japan) Nao Hibino (India) Prarthana Thombare | 6–1, 6–4 |
| Win | 6–3 | Jul 2014 | ITF Gatineau, Canada | 25,000 | Hard | (Japan) Chiaki Okadaue | (Japan) Mana Ayukawa (Poland) Justyna Jegiołka | 6–1, 6–4 |
| Win | 7–3 | Jul 2014 | Challenger de Granby, Canada | 25,000 | Hard | (Japan) Riko Sawayanagi | (Canada) Erin Routliffe (Canada) Carol Zhao | w/o |
| Win | 8–3 | Feb 2015 | Open de l'Isère, France | 25,000 | Hard (i) | (Netherlands) Demi Schuurs | (France) Manon Arcangioli (Netherlands) Cindy Burger | 6–1, 6–3 |
| Win | 9–3 | Mar 2015 | ITF Mildura, Australia | 15,000 | Grass | (Japan) Yuuki Tanaka | (China) Tian Ran (China) Wang Yan | 6–2, 6–0 |
| Loss | 9–4 | Mar 2015 | Blossom Cup, China | 50,000 | Hard | (Japan) Junri Namigata | (Japan) Eri Hozumi (Japan) Makoto Ninomiya | 3–6, 7–6^{(2)}, [2–10] |
| Win | 10–4 | Jun 2015 | ITF Andijan, Uzbekistan | 25,000 | Hard | (Uzbekistan) Nigina Abduraimova | (Russia) Veronika Kudermetova (Russia) Ksenia Lykina | 4–6, 7–6^{(5)}, [11–9] |
| Win | 11–4 | Sep 2015 | ITF Bangkok, Thailand | 15,000 | Hard | (Japan) Ayaka Okuno | (Japan) Mana Ayukawa (Japan) Yuuki Tanaka | 2–6, 6–1, [10–6] |
| Loss | 11–5 | Nov 2015 | Bendigo International, Australia | 50,000 | Hard | (Russia) Natela Dzalamidze | (United States) Lauren Embree (United States) Asia Muhammad | 5–7, 3–6 |
| Loss | 11–6 | May 2016 | Kangaroo Cup, Japan | 75,000 | Hard | (Japan) Ayaka Okuno | (Japan) Eri Hozumi (Japan) Miyu Kato | 1–6, 2–6 |
| Win | 12–6 | Jul 2016 | Lexington Challenger, United States | 50,000 | Hard | (China) Zhu Lin | (United States) Sophie Chang (United States) Alexandra Mueller | 6–0, 7–5 |
| Win | 13–6 | Oct 2016 | Suzhou Ladies Open, China | 50,000 | Hard | (Japan) Akiko Omae | (United States) Jacqueline Cako (Uzbekistan) Sabina Sharipova | 6–1, 6–3 |
| Win | 14–6 | Jan 2017 | ITF Hong Kong, China SAR | 25,000 | Hard | (Japan) Akiko Omae | (Russia) Ksenia Lykina (Japan) Riko Sawayanagi | 6–1, 6–0 |
| Loss | 14–7 | Mar 2017 | Blossom Cup, China | 60,000 | Hard | (China) Zhu Lin | (China) Han Xinyun (China) Ye Qiuyu | 3–6, 3–6 |
| Loss | 14–8 | Jun 2017 | Kōfu International, Japan | 25,000 | Hard | (Japan) Riko Sawayanagi | (Japan) Rika Fujiwara (Japan) Kyōka Okamura | 6–7^{(4)}, 3–6 |
| Win | 15–8 | Jul 2017 | ITF Winnipeg, Canada | 25,000 | Hard | (Russia) Valeria Savinykh | (Australia) Kimberly Birrell (United States) Caroline Dolehide | 6–4, 7–6^{(4)} |
| Win | 16–8 | Jul 2017 | ITF Gatineau, Canada | 25,000 | Hard | (Russia) Valeria Savinykh | (Australia) Kimberly Birrell (United Kingdom) Emily Webley-Smith | 4–6, 6–3, [10–5] |
| Loss | 16–9 | Aug 2017 | Lexington Challenger, US | 60,000 | Hard | (Russia) Valeria Savinykh | (Australia) Priscilla Hon (Belarus) Vera Lapko | 3–6, 4–6 |
| Loss | 16–10 | Aug 2018 | ITF Tsukuba, Japan | 25,000 | Hard | (Australia) Naiktha Bains | (Japan) Akiko Omae (China) You Xiaodi | 0–6, 6–7^{(4)} |
| Win | 17–10 | Sep 2018 | Darwin International, Australia | 60,000 | Hard | (India) Rutuja Bhosale | (Australia) Kimberly Birrell (United Kingdom) Katy Dunne | 6–2, 6–4 |
| Loss | 17–11 | Jan 2019 | ITF Hong Kong, China SAR | W25 | Hard | (Japan) Robu Kajtani | (Chinese Taipei) Chen Pei-hsuan (Chinese Taipei) Wu Fang-hsien | 3–6, 3–6 |
| Loss | 17–12 | Mar 2019 | Pingshan Open, China | W60 | Hard | (Uzbekistan) Sabina Sharipova | (Chinese Taipei) Liang En-shuo (China) Xun Fangying | 4–6, 1–6 |
| Win | 18–12 | May 2019 | Kurume Cup, Japan | W60 | Carpet | (United States) Ena Shibahara | (Japan) Erina Hayashi (Japan) Moyuka Uchijima | 0–6, 6–4, [10–5] |
| Loss | 18–13 | Aug 2021 | ITF Bydgoszcz, Poland | W25 | Clay | (Colombia) Yuliana Lizarazo | (Brazil) Carolina Alves (Belarus) Iryna Shymanovich | 1–6, 6–3, [5–10] |
| Win | 19–13 | Sep 2021 | Caldas da Rainha Open, Portugal | W60+H | Hard | (Japan) Momoko Kobori | (United Kingdom) Alicia Barnett (United Kingdom) Olivia Nicholls | 7–6^{(5)}, 7–6^{(2)} |
| Win | 20–13 | Apr 2022 | ITF Monastir, Tunisia | W25 | Hard | (Uzbekistan) Nigina Abduraimova | (New Zealand) Paige Hourigan; Valeria Savinykh | 6–1, 3–6, [12–10] |
| Loss | 20–14 | Aug 2022 | Bronx Open, United States | W60 | Hard | (South Korea) Han Na-lae | Anna Blinkova (Switzerland) Simona Waltert | 3–6, 3–6 |
| Loss | 20–15 | Jan 2023 | ITF Nonthaburi, Thailand | W40 | Hard | (Ukraine) Kateryna Volodko | (Chinese Taipei) Liang En-shuo (China) Ma Yexin | 0–6, 3–6 |
| Loss | 20–16 | Jun 2023 | ITF La Marsa, Tunisia | W40 | Hard | (Ukraine) Kateryna Volodko | Maria Kozyreva (China) Wei Sijia | 7–5, 4–6, [6–10] |
| Finalist (Note: The match was not played due to poor weather.) | –NP- | Nov 2023 | ITF Santo Domingo, Dominican Republic | W25 | Hard | (Brazil) Rebeca Pereira | (Poland) Anna Hertel (Poland) Olivia Lincer | not played |
| Loss | 20–17 | Apr 2024 | ITF Jackson, United States | W35 | Clay | (United States) Victoria Flores | (Spain) Alicia Herrero Liñana (Argentina) Melany Krywoj | 3–6, 6–2, [7–10] |
| Loss | 20–18 | Jul 2024 | Evansville Classic, United States | W75 | Hard | (India) Sahaja Yamalapalli | (Spain) Alicia Herrero Liñana (Argentina) Melany Krywoj | 2–6, 0–6 |
| Loss | 20–19 | Jul 2024 | Dallas Summer Series, United States | W50 | Hard (i) | (Mexico) Jéssica Hinojosa Gómez | (United States) Usue Maitane Arconada (United States) Katrina Scott | 3–6, 3–6 |
| Loss | 20–20 | Aug 2024 | Saskatoon Challenger, Canada | W35 | Hard | (United States) Maribella Zamarripa | (Canada) Ariana Arseneault (Canada) Mia Kupres | 4–6, 3–6 |
| Loss | 20–21 | Nov 2024 | ITF Veracruz, Mexico | W50 | Hard (i) | (Mexico) Jéssica Hinojosa Gómez | (United States) Hanna Chang (United States) Dalayna Hewitt | 4–6, 5–7 |
| Win | 21–21 | Nov 2024 | ITF Santo Domingo, Dominican Republic | W35 | Hard | (United States) Haley Giavara | (United States) Kolie Allen (Colombia) Yuliana Monroy | 5–7, 6–4, [10–6] |
| Win | 22–21 | Jun 2025 | ITF Santo Domingo, Dominican Republic | W35 | Hard | (India) Sahaja Yamalapalli | (United Kingdom) Esther Adeshina (Venezuela) Sofía Elena Cabezas Domínguez | 6–3, 6–2 |
| Win | 23–21 | Jul 2025 | ITF Florence, United States | W35 | Hard | (United States) Haley Giavara | (Venezuela) Sofía Elena Cabezas Domínguez (United States) Kylie Collins | 6–0, 6–4 |
| Loss | 23–22 | Aug 2025 | ITF Southaven, United States | W35 | Hard | (Japan) Kyōka Okamura | (United States) Catherine Harrison (United States) Ashley Lahey | 3–6, 2–6 |
| Win | 24–22 | Aug 2025 | Saskatoon Challenger, Canada | W50 | Hard | (Japan) Saki Imamura | (Canada) Raphaëlle Lacasse (Canada) Alexandra Vagramov | 7–6^{(3)}, 3–6, [10–1] |
| Loss | 24–23 | Sep 2025 | Incheon Open, South Korea | W100 | Hard | (Indonesia) Priska Madelyn Nugroho | (Japan) Saki Imamura (South Korea) Park So-hyun | 3–6, 6–4, [7–10] |
| Win | 25–23 | Dec 2025 | ITF New Delhi, India | W35 | Hard | (Russia) Ekaterina Yashina | (India) Vaidehi Chaudhari (India) Zeel Desai | 6–2, 6–3 |
| Loss | 25–24 | Jun 2026 | Cary Tennis Classic, United States | W100 | Hard | (India) Ankita Raina | (United States) Catherine Harrison (United States) Dalayna Hewitt | 4–6, 2–6 |
| Loss | 25–25 | Sep 2026 | ITF Guiyang, China | W50 | Hard | (Japan) Eri Shimizu | (China) Guo Meiqi (China) Yang Yidi | 6–4, 3–6, [8–10] |
| Loss | 25–26 | Oct 2026 | ITF Wrexham, United Kingdom | W100 | Hard (i) | (India) Ankita Raina | (United Kingdom) Freya Christie (United Kingdom) Eden Silva | 2–6, 3–6 |
