= Varvara Panshina =

Russian tennis player (born 2006)

- Full name: Varvara Nikolaevna Panshina
- Country (sports): Russia
- Born: 11 February 2006 (age 20) Volgograd, Russia
- Plays: Right-handed
- Prize money: $51,459

Singles
- Career record: 96–51
- Career titles: 1 ITF
- Highest ranking: No. 338 (24 August 2026)
- Current ranking: No. 338 (24 August 2026)

Doubles
- Career record: 79–36
- Career titles: 9 ITF
- Highest ranking: No. 173 (24 August 2026)
- Current ranking: No. 173 (24 August 2026)
- Last updated on: 24 August 2026.

Varvara Nikolaevna Panshina (Russian: Варвара Николаевна Паньшина, born 11 February 2006) is a Russian tennis player.

Panshina has a career-high singles ranking by the WTA of 338, achieved on 24 August 2026. She also has a career-high WTA doubles ranking of 173, set on 24 August 2026.

== Career ==
In June 2025, she won her first singles tournament in Tashkent, Uzbekistan. She won in November 2025 in Sharm El Sheikh, Egypt, with her partner Daria Zelinskaya.

Panshina won her first major ITF title at the W100 Jin'an Open in the doubles draw, partnering Ekaterina Ovcharenko.

== ITF Circuit finals ==
=== Singles: 3 (1 title, 2 runner-ups) ===
Legend W15 tournaments (1–2)	Finals by surface Hard (1–2)

Result	W–L	Date	Tournament	Tier	Surface	Opponent	Score
Win	1–0	Jun 2025	ITF Tashkent, Uzbekistan	W15	Hard	(India) Vaishnavi Adkar	6–2, 6–4
Loss	1–1	Jun 2025	ITF Tashkent, Uzbekistan	W15	Hard	(Uzbekistan) Laima Vladson	5–7, 5–7
Loss	1–2	Aug 2025	ITF Ankara, Turkiye	W15	Hard	Maria Golovina	3–6, 6–2, 5–7

=== Doubles: 17 (9 titles, 8 runner-ups) ===
Legend W100 tournaments (1–0) W75 tournaments (2–0) W50 tournaments (1–1) W35 tournaments (0–5) W15 tournaments (5–2)	Finals by surface Hard (6–8) Clay (3–0)

Result	W–L	Date	Tournament	Tier	Surface	Partner	Opponents	Score
Loss	0–1	Aug 2024	ITF Ust-Kamenogorsk, Kazakhstan	W15	Hard	(Uzbekistan) Daria Shubina	(South Korea) Back Da-yeon; Anastasia Sukhotina	3–6, 1–6
Loss	0–2	Oct 2024	ITF Kayseri, Turkiye	W15	Hard	(Uzbekistan) Daria Shubina	(Romania) Ștefania Bojică (Romania) Briana Szabó	4–6, 2–6
Loss	0–3	Dec 2024	ITF Sharm El Sheikh, Egypt	W35	Hard	Daria Zelinskaya	(Poland) Martyna Kubka (Slovakia) Katarína Kužmová	2–6, 6–7^{(2)}
Win	1–3	Jan 2025	ITF Sharm El Sheikh	W15	Hard	Daria Khomutsianskaya	(Netherlands) Joy de Zeeuw (Netherlands) Britt du Pree	7–5, 6–4
Win	2–3	Feb 2025	ITF Sharm El Sheikh	W15	Hard	Daria Khomutsianskaya	(Bulgaria) Julia Stamatova (Germany) Anja Wildgruber	6–2, 7–5
Loss	2–4	Apr 2025	ITF Sharm El Sheikh	W35	Hard	Daria Zelinskaya	Maria Golovina; Daria Shadchneva	walkover
Loss	2–5	May 2025	ITF Lopota, Georgia	W50	Hard	Daria Zelinskaya	Kira Pavlova; Ksenia Zaytseva	4–6, 6–4, [7–10]
Win	3–5	Aug 2025	ITF Ankara, Turkiye	W15	Hard	Maria Golovina	(Latvia) Adelina Lachinova (Turkey) Doğa Türkmen	4–6, 6–3, [10–5]
Win	4–5	Sep 2025	ITF Guiyang, China	W50	Hard	Daria Zelinskaya	(China) Tian Fangran (China) Zhang Ying	6–2, 6–4
Loss	4–6	Oct 2025	ITF Istanbul, Turkiye	W35	Hard (i)	Daria Zelinskaya	(Romania) Elena Ruxandra Bertea; Alevtina Ibragimova	3–6, 2–6
Win	5–6	Nov 2025	ITF Sharm El Sheikh, Egypt	W15	Hard	Daria Zelinskaya	(Egypt) Aya El Sayed (Egypt) Nada Fouad	6–4, 5–7, [13–11]
Loss	5–7	Mar 2026	ITF Maanshan, China	W35	Hard (i)	(China) Wang Jiaqi	Daria Egorova; Alevtina Ibragimova	6–7^{(3)}, 6–3, [6–10]
Win	6–7	Mar 2026	Jin'an Open, China	W100	Hard	Ekaterina Ovcharenko	(Indonesia) Priska Madelyn Nugroho (Australia) Alexandra Osborne	6–2, 6–2
Win	7–7	Aug 2026	ITF Kuršumlijska Banja, Serbia	W15	Clay	Felitsata Dorofeeva Rybas	(Colombia) María Herazo (United States) Mia Horvit	4–6, 7–6^{(3)}, [10–4]
Win	8–7	Aug 2026	Serbian Tennis Tour, Serbia	W75	Clay	(Bulgaria) Rositsa Dencheva	(China) Feng Shuo (China) Li Zongyu	6–4, 7–5
Win	9–7	Aug 2026	Serbian Tennis Tour 2	W75	Clay	Rada Zolotareva	(Croatia) Lucija Ćirić Bagarić (Poland) Weronika Falkowska	7–5, 6–4
Loss	9–8	Oct 2026	ITF Qiandaohu, China	W35	Hard	Rada Zolotareva	(Indonesia) Priska Nugroho (China) Zheng Wushuang	3–6, 7–6^{(2)}, [3–10]
