= Rada Zolotareva =

Russian tennis player (born 2008)

- Country (sports): Russia
- Born: 28 September 2008 Sochi, Russia
- Plays: Right (two-handed backhand)
- Prize money: $54,005

Singles
- Career record: 97–42
- Career titles: 3 ITF
- Highest ranking: No. 281 (14 September 2026)
- Current ranking: No. 328 (2 November 2026)

Grand Slam singles results
- Australian Open Junior: SF (2026)

Doubles
- Career record: 72–29
- Career titles: 8 ITF
- Highest ranking: No. 313 (14 September 2026)
- Current ranking: No. 342 (2 November 2026)

Grand Slam doubles results
- Australian Open Junior: SF (2026)
- Last updated on: 2 November 2026.

Rada Zolotareva (born 28 September 2008) is a Russian tennis player. She has career-high WTA rankings of No. 281 in singles, reached on 14 September 2026, and No. 313 in doubles, achieved on 14 September 2026.

Her sister Anastasia Zolotareva is also a tennis player.

== Career ==
Zolotareva defeated Armenian Ani Amiraghyan in the final of the ITF Tsaghkadzor, Armenia in May 2025. In September 2025, she lost in the final of the ITF Kuršumlijska Banja, Serbia, to Lilli Tagger.

Playing alongside Vera Zvonareva she was a runner-up in the ladies doubles at the Al Habtoor Tennis Challenge in Dubai in December 2025, losing to Gao Xinyu and Mananchaya Sawangkaew in the final.

Competing in the girls' singles at the 2026 Australian Open, she recorded a win over junior grand slam winner Jana Kovačková on her way to the semi-finals where she faced French third seed Ksenia Efremova. Alongside compatriot Mariia Makarova, she also reached the semi-finals of the girls' doubles where they were defeated by eventual winners Jana and Alena Kovačková.

Playing alongside Varvara Panshina in August 2026, she reached the final of the women's doubles at W75 Kuršumlijska Banja III in Serbia where they faced Weronika Falkowska and Lucija Ćirić Bagarić, winning in straight sets. She also won the final in the women's singles at the tournament the following day in straight sets, against Lidia Encheva of Bulgaria.

Entering as a lucky loser, Zolotareva made her WTA Tour main draw debut at the 2026 Chennai Open, losing to 10th seed Lucrezia Stefanini in the first round.

== ITF Circuit finals ==
=== Singles: 6 (3 titles, 3 runner-ups) ===
Legend W75 tournaments (1–1) W35 tournaments (0–1) W15 tournaments (2–1)	Finals by surface Hard (0–1) Clay (3–2)

Result	W–L	Date	Tournament	Tier	Surface	Opponent	Score
Loss	0–1	Aug 2024	ITF Tbilisi, Georgia	W15	Hard	Daria Egorova	3–6, 1–6
Win	1–1	Oct 2024	ITF Tsaghkadzor, Armenia	W15	Clay	Kristina Kroitor	6–1, 6–2
Win	2–1	May 2025	ITF Tsaghkadzor, Armenia	W15	Clay	(Armenia) Ani Amiraghyan	6–0, 7–5
Loss	2–2	Sep 2025	Serbian Tennis Tour, Serbia	W75	Clay	(Austria) Lilli Tagger	7–5, 2–6, 2–6
Loss	2–3	Feb 2026	ITF Antalya, Turkiye	W35	Clay	(Argentina) Luisina Giovannini	6–4, 4–6, 2–6
Win	3–3	Aug 2026	Serbian Tennis Tour, Serbia	W75	Clay	(Bulgaria) Lidia Encheva	6–4, 6–1

=== Doubles: 15 (8 titles, 7 runner-ups) ===
Legend W100 tournaments (0–1) W75 tournaments (1–0) W50 tournaments (0–1) W25/35 tournaments (0–3) W15 tournaments (7–2)	Finals by surface Hard (1–3) Clay (7–4)

Result	W–L	Date	Tournament	Tier	Surface	Partner	Opponents	Score
Loss	0–1	Nov 2022	ITF Antalya, Turkiye	W15	Clay	Anastasia Zolotareva	(Chinese Taipei) Yu-Yun Li (Kazakhstan) Aruzhan Sagandykova	5–7, 6–3, [4–10]
Loss	0–2	May 2023	ITF Kachreti, Georgia	W25	Clay	Anastasia Zolotareva	Maria Kozyreva; Ekaterina Ovcharenko	5–7, 3–6
Win	1–2	Dec 2023	ITF Antalya, Turkiye	W15	Clay	(Hungary) Amarissa Tóth	(Netherlands) Rikke de Koning (Netherlands) Madelief Hageman	6–1, 6–4
Win	2–2	Dec 2023	ITF Antalya, Turkiye	W15	Clay	(Romania) Anastasia Safta	(Hungary) Panna Bartha (Turkey) Ilay Yoruk	6–2, 6–0
Loss	2–3	Apr 2024	ITF Antalya, Turkiye	W15	Clay	Anastasia Zolotareva	(Czech Republic) Linda Ševčíková (Czech Republic) Karolina Vlčková	3–6, 3–6
Loss	2–4	May 2024	ITF Lopota, Georgia	W50	Hard	Anastasia Zolotareva	(Australia) Elysia Bolton (United States) Catherine Harrison	4–6, 2–6
Win	3–4	Aug 2024	ITF Tbilisi, Georgia	W15	Hard	Daria Egorova	Sofya Gapankova; Kseniya Yersh	3–6, 6–0, [13–11]
Win	4–4	Oct 2024	ITF Tsaghkadzor, Armenia	W15	Clay	Ekaterina Agureeva	Alina Yuneva; Valeria Iushchenko	6–4, 6–3
Win	5–4	Oct 2024	ITF Tsaghkadzor, Armenia	W15	Clay	Ekaterina Agureeva	Alina Yuneva; Valeria Iushchenko	7–6^{(4)}, 6–3
Win	6–4	Nov 2024	ITF Antalya, Turkiye	W15	Clay	(Turkey) Deniz Dilek	(United States) Baylen Brown (United States) Jamilah Snells	6–0, 6–2
Win	7–4	Sep 2025	ITF Kuršumlijska Banja, Serbia	W15	Clay	Alexandra Shubladze	Felitsata Dorofeeva-Rybas (Serbia) Lana Virc	6–2, 6–2
Loss	7–5	Oct 2025	ITF Huzhou, China	W35	Clay	(United States) Kristina Penickova	(China) Huang Yujia (China) Zhang Ying	2–6, 4–6
Loss	7–6	Dec 2025	Dubai Tennis Challenge, UAE	W100	Hard	Vera Zvonareva	(China) Gao Xinyu (Thailand) Mananchaya Sawangkaew	6–4, 5–7, [7–10]
Win	8–6	Aug 2026	Serbian Tennis Tour, Serbia	W75	Clay	Varvara Panshina	(Croatia) Lucija Ćirić Bagarić (Poland) Weronika Falkowska	7–5, 6–4
Loss	8–7	Oct 2026	ITF Qiandaohu, China	W35	Hard	Varvara Panshina	(Indonesia) Priska Nugroho (China) Zheng Wushuang	3–6, 7–6^{(2)}, [3–10]
