= Anastasia Zolotareva =

Russian tennis player

- Full name: Anastasia Aleksandrovna Zolotareva
- Country (sports): Russia
- Born: 18 January 2002 (age 24)
- Plays: Right (two-handed backhand)
- Prize money: $173,069

Singles
- Career record: 292–158
- Career titles: 18 ITF
- Highest ranking: No. 229 (25 May 2026)
- Current ranking: No. 341 (9 November 2026)

Doubles
- Career record: 184–133
- Career titles: 2 WTA 125, 13 ITF
- Highest ranking: No. 168 (4 May 2026)
- Current ranking: No. 241 (9 November 2026)
- Last updated on: 13 November 2026.

Anastasia Aleksandrovna Zolotareva (Russian: Анастасия Александровна Золотарёва born 18 January 2002) is a Russian tennis player. She has a career-high singles ranking of No. 229 by the WTA, reached on 25 May 2026, and a best doubles ranking of world No. 168, achieved on 4 May 2026.

She has won 18 singles and 13 doubles titles on the ITF Women's World Tennis Tour.

== Career ==
Zolotareva won her first big title at the 2022 President's Cup where she partnered with Mariia Tkacheva to win the doubles draw. In 2025 and 2026, she won the WTA 125 tournaments in Tucumán, Argentina and Huzhou, China.

== WTA 125 finals ==
=== Doubles: 3 (2 titles, 1 runner-up) ===
Result	W–L	Date	Tournament	Surface	Partner	Opponents	Score
Win	1–0	Nov 2025	Tucumán Open, Argentina	Clay	(Netherlands) Lian Tran	(Spain) Alicia Herrero Liñana (Ukraine) Valeriya Strakhova	2–6, 6–1, [10–6]
Loss	1–1	Dec 2025	Quito Open, Ecuador	Clay	(Spain) Irene Burillo	(Ukraine) Valeriya Strakhova; Anastasia Tikhonova	4–6, 1–6
Win	2–1	May 2026	Huzhou Open, China	Clay	Sofya Lansere	(Japan) Hiroko Kuwata (Chinese Taipei) Li Yu-yun	6–4, 6–1

== ITF Circuit finals ==
=== Singles: 20 (18 titles, 2 runner-ups) ===
Legend W50 tournaments W25/35 tournaments W15 tournaments	Finals by surface Hard (1–0) Clay (17–2)

Result	W–L	Date	Tournament	Tier	Surface	Opponent	Score
Win	1–0	Feb 2020	ITF Cairo, Egypt	W15	Clay	(Serbia) Tamara Čurović	4–6, 6–4, 6–0
Win	2–0	Sep 2021	ITF Cairo, Egypt	W15	Clay	(United States) Anastasia Nefedova	6–4, 6–4
Win	3–0	Sep 2021	ITF Cairo, Egypt	W15	Clay	(Italy) Gloria Ceschi	7–6^{(6)}, 6–2
Win	4–0	Sep 2021	ITF Cairo, Egypt	W15	Clay	(Russia) Valeriya Yushchenko	6–2, 6–1
Win	5–0	Oct 2021	ITF Cairo, Egypt	W15	Clay	(Egypt) Lamis Alhussein Abdel Aziz	6–2, 3–6, 6–3
Win	6–0	Dec 2021	ITF Cairo, Egypt	W15	Clay	(United States) Anastasia Nefedova	6–4, 6–2
Loss	6–1	Jan 2022	ITF Cairo, Egypt	W15	Clay	(Greece) Sapfo Sakellaridi	1–6, 4–6
Win	7–1	Jan 2022	ITF Cairo, Egypt	W15	Clay	(Greece) Sapfo Sakellaridi	1–6, 6–3, 6–2
Win	8–1	Apr 2022	ITF Cairo, Egypt	W15	Clay	(Germany) Emily Welker	7–5, 6–3
Win	9–1	May 2022	ITF Cairo, Egypt	W25	Clay	(France) Séléna Janicijevic	7–6^{(5)}, 7–6^{(4)}
Win	10–1	Sep 2022	ITF Cairo, Egypt	W25	Clay	(Spain) Rosa Vicens Mas	7–5, 6–7^{(4)}, 6–4
Win	11–1	Nov 2022	ITF Antalya, Turkiye	W15	Clay	(Czech Republic) Denise Hrdinková	6–0, 6–1
Win	12–1	Nov 2022	ITF Antalya, Turkiye	W15	Clay	(Serbia) Tamara Čurović	2–6, 7–6^{(2)}, 6–4
Win	13–1	Jun 2024	ITF Luzhou, China	W35	Hard	(China) Yao Xinxin	6–2, 6–4
Win	14–1	Jun 2025	ITF Kuršumlijska Banja, Serbia	W15	Clay	Alexandra Shubladze	7–5, 2–6, 7–5
Win	15–1	Jul 2025	ITF Casablanca, Morocco	W35	Clay	(Morocco) Yasmine Kabbaj	7–6^{(1)}, 6–4
Win	16–1	Feb 2026	ITF Antalya, Turkiye	W15	Clay	(Slovakia) Nina Vargová	6–3, 7–6^{(5)}
Win	17–1	Apr 2026	Kunming Open, China	W35	Clay	Alexandra Shubladze	2–6, 6–2, 7–6^{(5)}
Loss	17–2	Apr 2026	ITF Baotou, China	W50	Clay (i)	(China) Wang Xiyu	2–6, 3–6
Win	18–2	Jun 2026	ITF Kuršumlijska Banja, Serbia	W15	Clay	(Bulgaria) Lidia Encheva	6–4, 6–2

=== Doubles: 27 (13 titles, 14 runner-ups) ===
Legend W60 tournaments W40/50 tournaments W25 tournaments W15 tournaments	Finals by surface Hard (1–6) Clay (12–8)

Result	W–L	Date	Tournament	Tier	Surface	Partner	Opponents	Score
Win	1–0	Sep 2019	ITF Cairo, Egypt	W15	Clay	(Egypt) Lamis Alhussein Abdel Aziz	(Serbia) Bojana Marinković (Egypt) Sandra Samir	7–5, 2–6, [10–3]
Loss	1–1	Feb 2020	ITF Cairo, Egypt	W15	Clay	(Russia) Anna Morgina	(Serbia) Tamara Čurović (Serbia) Elena Milovanović	2–6, 6–2, [2–10]
Loss	1–2	Mar 2021	ITF Sharm El Sheikh, Egypt	W15	Hard	(Slovakia) Barbora Matúšová	(Japan) Momoko Kobori (Japan) Ayano Shimizu	1–6, 2–6
Loss	1–3	Apr 2021	ITF Cairo, Egypt	W15	Clay	(Slovakia) Barbora Matúšová	(Russia) Elina Avanesyan (South Korea) Park So-hyun	4–6, 4–6
Win	2–3	Aug 2021	ITF Chornomorsk, Ukraine	W15	Clay	(Ukraine) Viktoriya Petrenko	(Ukraine) Mariia Bergen (Belarus) Anastasiya Komar	4–6, 6–2, [10–8]
Win	3–3	Sep 2021	ITF Cairo, Egypt	W15	Clay	(Russia) Ekaterina Vishnevskaya	(Thailand) Punnin Kovapitukted (Russia) Anna Ureke	7–5, 0–6, [10–3]
Win	4–3	Dec 2021	ITF Cairo, Egypt	W15	Clay	(Belarus) Aliona Falei	(Kazakhstan) Yekaterina Dmitrichenko (Egypt) Sandra Samir	6–4, 6–2
Win	5–3	Dec 2021	ITF Cairo, Egypt	W15	Clay	(Austria) Melanie Klaffner	(Ukraine) Viktoriya Petrenko (Russia) Anna Ureke	2–6, 6–3, [10–2]
Win	6–3	Jan 2022	ITF Cairo, Egypt	W15	Clay	Mariia Tkacheva	(Ukraine) Mariia Bergen (Bulgaria) Ani Vangelova	6–3, 1–6, [10–8]
Win	7–3	Jan 2022	ITF Cairo, Egypt	W15	Clay	Mariia Tkacheva	(Greece) Sapfo Sakellaridi (China) Youmi Zhuoma	6–1, 6–4
Loss	7–4	Jan 2022	ITF Cairo, Egypt	W15	Clay	Mariia Tkacheva	(Romania) Oana Georgeta Simion; Anna Ureke	3–6, 6–7^{(4)}
Loss	7–5	Mar 2022	ITF Antalya, Turkey	W15	Clay	(Greece) Sapfo Sakellaridi	(Czech Republic) Miriam Kolodziejová (Czech Republic) Jesika Malečková	2–6, 4–6
Loss	7–6	Mar 2022	ITF Antalya, Turkiye	W15	Clay	(Greece) Sapfo Sakellaridi	Ksenia Laskutova (Hungary) Amarissa Tóth	6–7^{(4)}, 6–1, [7–10]
Win	8–6	May 2022	ITF Cairo, Egypt	W15	Clay	(Austria) Melanie Klaffner	(France) Océane Babel (Netherlands) Noa Liauw a Fong	6–1, 7–5
Win	9–6	Jul 2022	President's Cup, Kazakhstan	W60	Hard	Mariia Tkacheva	(Japan) Momoko Kobori (Japan) Moyuka Uchijima	4–6, 6–1, [10–4]
Loss	9–7	Nov 2022	ITF Antalya, Turkiye	W15	Clay	Rada Zolotareva	(Chinese Taipei) Li Yu-yun (Kazakhstan) Aruzhan Sagandikova	5–7, 6–3, [4–10]
Loss	9–8	May 2023	ITF Tbilisi, Georgia	W40	Hard	Anastasia Zakharova	(Georgia (country)) Ekaterine Gorgodze (India) Ankita Raina	6–4, 2–6, [6–10]
Loss	9–9	May 2023	ITF Kachreti, Georgia	W25	Hard	Rada Zolotareva	Maria Kozyreva; Ekaterina Ovcharenko	5–7, 3–6
Loss	9–10	Jul 2023	ITF Darmstadt, Germany	W25	Clay	(Romania) Arina Vasilescu	(Czech Republic) Michaela Bayerlová (Australia) Alana Parnaby	5–7, 4–6
Win	10–10	Apr 2024	ITF Antalya, Turkiye	W15	Clay	(Japan) Nana Kawagishi	(Germany) Nicole Rivkin (Switzerland) Katerina Tsygourova	7–5, 1–6, [10–6]
Loss	10–11	Apr 2024	ITF Antalya, Turkiye	W15	Clay	Rada Zolotareva	(Czech Republic) Linda Sevciková (Czech Republic) Karolina Vlcková	3–6, 3–6
Loss	10–12	May 2024	ITF Lopota, Georgia	W50	Hard	Rada Zolotareva	(Australia) Elysia Bolton (United States) Catherine Harrison	4–6, 2–6
Loss	10–13	Jun 2024	ITF Hong Kong, China SAR	W15	Hard	(China) Dang Yiming	(Japan) Hiromi Abe (Japan) Saki Imamura	4–6, 1–6
Loss	10–14	Jan 2025	ITF La Marsa, Tunisia	W50	Hard	Anastasia Gasanova	(China) Xiao Zhenghua (China) Yuan Chengyiyi	6–2, 5–7, [8–10]
Win	11–14	Mar 2025	ITF Gonesse, France	W15	Clay (i)	Kristina Kroitor	(France) Astrid Cirotte (France) Lucie Pawlak	6–2, 6–2
Win	12–14	Mar 2025	ITF Le Havre, France	W15	Clay (i)	Kristina Kroitor	(Belgium) Kaat Coppez (Belgium) Amélie Van Impe	6–4, 6–4
Win	13–14	Jun 2025	ITF Kuršumlijska Banja, Serbia	W15	Clay	Alexandra Shubladze	Alina Yuneva; Valeriya Iushchenko	6–3, 6–2
