= Gao Xinyu =

Chinese tennis player (born 1997)

Gao Xinyu 高馨妤
- Country (sports): China
- Residence: Beijing, China
- Born: 21 November 1997 (age 28) Beijing
- Height: 1.80 m (5 ft 11 in)
- Turned pro: 2014
- Plays: Right (two-handed backhand)
- Prize money: $686,891

Singles
- Career record: 296–190
- Career titles: 15 ITF
- Highest ranking: No. 125 (24 February 2025)
- Current ranking: No. 220 (12 October 2026)

Grand Slam singles results
- Australian Open: Q2 (2025)
- French Open: Q2 (2026)
- Wimbledon: Q1 (2024, 2025)
- US Open: Q2 (2024)

Doubles
- Career record: 98–86
- Career titles: 7 ITF
- Highest ranking: No. 230 (11 September 2017)
- Current ranking: No. 607 (12 October 2026)
- Last updated on: 18 October 2026.

Gao Xinyu (Chinese: 高馨妤; pinyin: Gāo Xīnyú; Mandarin pronunciation: [káʊ ɕín y̌]; born 21 November 1997) is a Chinese tennis player. Gao has a career-high singles ranking of world No. 125, achieved on 24 February 2025. On 11 September 2017, she peaked at No. 230 in the WTA doubles rankings.

Gao has won 15 singles titles and seven doubles titles on the ITF Women's Circuit.

== Career ==
In 2016, she made her WTA Tour main-draw debut at the Tianjin Open, where she was given a wildcard with Zhang Ying. The pair won their first round, defeating Han Xinyun and Zhang Kailin but then fell in the quarterfinals to second seeds Lara Arruabarrena and Oksana Kalashnikova.

She qualified for the main draw of the 2024 Thailand Open 2 and defeated compatriot and fellow qualifier Wei Sijia in the first round to register her maiden WTA Tour level win, before losing to Arianne Hartono in the next round.

She received a wildcard for the main draw of the 2024 China Open but lost to qualifier Sara Sorribes Tormo in a match that lasted for 4 hours and 15 minutes, becoming the fourth-longest match on the WTA Tour in the Open Era and surpassing the 2024 Thailand Open 2 second-round match between Laura Siegemund and Wang Xiyu in the previous week.

As the No. 1 singles player representing China at the 2025 United Cup (replacing Zheng Qinwen), Gao broke another record for the longest WTA singles match in the tournament history, when she defeated Beatriz Haddad Maia in 3 hours and 22 minutes. She subsequently defeated Laura Siegemund to send China into the quarterfinals.

== ITF Circuit finals ==
=== Singles: 22 (15 titles, 7 runner-ups) ===
Legend W100 tournaments (0–1) W75 tournaments (0–1) W40/50 tournaments (3–3) W25/35 tournaments (8–2) W10/15 tournaments (4–0)	Finals by surface Hard (12–6) Clay (3–1)

Result	W–L	Date	Tournament	Tier	Surface	Opponent	Score
Win	1–0	Jun 2015	ITF Anning, China	W10	Clay	(China) Zhao Di	6–0, 6–4
Win	2–0	Jun 2015	ITF Anning, China (2)	W10	Clay	(China) Gai Ao	6–4, 1–6, 6–4
Win	3–0	Sep 2016	ITF Hua Hin, Thailand	W25	Hard	(Japan) Shiho Akita	6–2, 1–6, 7–5
Win	4–0	Mar 2017	ITF Nanjing, China	W15	Hard	(China) Tang Haochen	6–4, 6–3
Win	5–0	May 2017	ITF Yuxi, China	W25	Hard	(China) Xun Fangying	6–1, 6–4
Win	6–0	May 2017	ITF Qujing, China	W25	Hard	(Italy) Giulia Gatto-Monticone	6–1, 3–6, 6–3
Win	7–0	Mar 2018	ITF Xiamen, China	W15	Hard	(Uzbekistan) Sabina Sharipova	6–1, 6–2
Loss	7–1	Jun 2019	ITF Naiman, China	W25	Hard	(China) You Xiaodi	3–6, 3–6
Win	8–1	Jun 2022	ITF Chiang Rai, Thailand	W25	Hard	(Thailand) Peangtarn Plipuech	6–3, 6–3
Win	9–1	Jun 2022	ITF Chiang Rai, Thailand	W25	Hard	(Japan) Nao Hibino	6–1, 1–6, 6–3
Win	10–1	Aug 2022	ITF Roehampton, United Kingdom	W25	Hard	(United Kingdom) Amarni Banks	6–1, 6–0
Win	11–1	Jul 2023	ITF Corroios-Seixal, Portugal	W25	Hard	Aliona Falei	6–2, 6–3
Win	12–1	Aug 2023	Kunming Open, China	W40	Clay	(China) Wei Sijia	6–3, 7–6^{(2)}
Win	13–1	Mar 2024	ITF Santo Domingo, Dominican Rep.	W35	Hard	(Mexico) Victoria Rodríguez	6–3, 6–2
Loss	13–2	Mar 2024	ITF Santo Domingo, Dominican Rep.	W35	Hard	(Australia) Maya Joint	4–6, 6–2, 1–6
Win	14–2	Apr 2024	ITF Shenzhen, China	W50	Hard	(China) Wei Sijia	6–4, 6–4
Win	15–2	Jun 2024	ITF La Marsa, Tunisia	W50	Hard	(Poland) Martyna Kubka	5–7, 6–3, 6–3
Loss	15–3	Sep 2024	Incheon Open, South Korea	W100	Hard	Tatiana Prozorova	3–6, 0–6
Loss	15–4	Feb 2025	ITF Leszno, Poland	W75	Hard (i)	(France) Elsa Jacquemot	4–6, 1–6
Loss	15–5	Mar 2026	ITF Helsinki, Finland	W50	Hard (i)	(Germany) Noma Noha Akugue	0–4 ret.
Loss	15–6	Jul 2026	ITF Corroios-Seixal, Portugal	W50	Hard	(United States) Carol Lee	6–1, 1–6, 2–6
Loss	15–7	Aug 2026	Prague Open, Czech Republic	W50	Clay	(Czech Republic) Jana Kovačková	1–6, 1–6

=== Doubles: 13 (7 titles, 6 runner-ups) ===
Legend W100 tournaments (1–1) W25 tournaments (4–1) W10/15 tournaments (2–4)	Finals by surface Hard (6–5) Clay (1–1)

Result	W–L	Date	Tournament	Tier	Surface	Partner	Opponents	Score
Loss	0–1	Jul 2014	ITF Istanbul, Turkey	W10	Hard	(China) Ye Qiuyu	(Norway) Emma Flood (Netherlands) Nikki Luttikhuis	6–7^{(5)}, 6–2, [6–10]
Loss	0–2	Aug 2014	ITF Istanbul, Turkey	W10	Hard	(China) You Xiaodi	(Japan) Mai Minokoshi (Japan) Akiko Omae	6–3, 2–6, [4–10]
Loss	0–3	Aug 2014	ITF Istanbul, Turkey	W10	Hard	(China) Yang Zhaoxuan	(China) Wang Yan (China) You Xiaodi	w/o
Win	1–3	Jun 2015	ITF Anning, China	W10	Clay	(China) Zhang Ying	(China) Li Yihong (China) Tang Qianhui	6–4, 6–2
Win	2–3	Jul 2017	ITF Naiman, China	W25	Hard	(China) Xun Fangying	(China) Lu Jingjing (China) You Xiaodi	6–7^{(5)}, 6–4, [10–8]
Win	3–3	Mar 2018	Kōfu International Open, Japan	W25	Hard	(Thailand) Luksika Kumkhum	(Japan) Erina Hayashi (Japan) Momoko Kobori	6–0, 2–6, [10–4]
Win	4–3	Apr 2022	ITF Chiang Rai, Thailand	W15	Hard	(China) Xun Fangying	(Hong Kong) Maggie Ng (Hong Kong) Wu Ho-ching	6–3, 7–6^{(4)}
Loss	4–4	Sep 2022	ITF Cairo, Egypt	W15	Clay	(Japan) Mayuka Aikawa	(Egypt) Yasmin Ezzat (Greece) Dimitra Pavlou	2–6, 0–6
Win	5–4	Apr 2023	ITF Sharm El Sheik, Egypt	W25	Hard	(China) Wang Meiling	(Russia) Aglaya Fedorova (Russia) Darya Shauha	6–3, 6–2
Loss	5–5	Sep 2023	ITF Tauste-Zaragoza, Spain	W25+H	Hard	(Russia) Ekaterina Ovcharenko	(United States) Makenna Jones (United States) Jamie Loeb	2–6, 7–5, [6–10]
Loss	5–6	Oct 2023	ITF Les Franqueses del Vallès, Spain	W100	Hard	(Latvia) Darja Semeņistaja	(Italy) Camilla Rosatello (Italy) Angelica Moratelli	6–4, 5–7, [6–10]
Win	6–6	Nov 2023	ITF Monastir, Tunisia	W25	Hard	(Kazakhstan) Zhibek Kulambayeva	(Russia) Aliona Falei (Russia) Polina Iatcenko	6–0, 2–6, [10–7]
Win	7–6	Dec 2025	Dubai Tennis Challenge, UAE	W100	Hard	(Thailand) Mananchaya Sawangkaew	(Russia) Rada Zolotareva (Russia) Vera Zvonareva	4–6, 7–5, [10–7]
