= 2025 ITF Nonthaburi 2 – Singles =

Singles
- 2025 ITF Nonthaburi 2

Final
- Champion: (China) Yao Xinxin
- Runner-up: (China) Zheng Wushuang
- Score: 6–4, 6–0

Events
Singles	Doubles
← 2024 ·	ITF Nonthaburi	· 2026 →

Mananchaya Sawangkaew was the defending champion but chose to compete at the Australian Open qualifying instead.

Yao Xinxin won the title, defeating Zheng Wushuang in the final; 6–4, 6–0.

== Seeds ==
1. (China) Ma Yexin (first round)
2. (United States) Maria Mateas (quarterfinals)
3. (Croatia) Petra Marčinko (quarterfinals)
4. (South Korea) Jang Su-jeong (first round, retired)
5. (China) Yao Xinxin (champion)
6. (China) Lu Jiajing (first round)
7. (Japan) Mei Yamaguchi (second round)
8. Kristina Dmitruk (semifinals, retired)

== Draw ==
Key

- Q = Qualifier
- WC = Wild card
- LL = Lucky loser
- Alt = Alternate
- ITF = ITF entry
- PR = Protected ranking
- SR = Special ranking
- SE = Special exempt
- JE = Junior exempt
- JR = Junior Accelerator Programme entrant
- CO = College Accelerator Programme entrant
- NG = Next Gen Accelerator Program entrant
- w/o = Walkover
- r = Retired
- d = Defaulted

=== Finals ===
Semifinals
Q	(China) Zheng Wushuang	6	2
8/SR	Kristina Dmitruk	3	0^{r}
5	(China) Yao Xinxin	7^{7}	6
Mariia Tkacheva	6^{5}	3

Final
Q	(China) Zheng Wushuang	4	0
5	(China) Yao Xinxin	6	6

=== Top half ===
First round
1	(China) Y Ma	6	2	5
(France) T Andrianjafitrimo	3	6	7
WC	(Thailand) A Chanta	6	4	3
(Italy) C Rosatello	1	6	6
(Japan) A Shimizu	6	6
Q	(Japan) H Kuwata	1	0
Q	(China) W Zheng	1	6	6
6	(China) J Lu	6	3	3
3	(Croatia) P Marčinko	6	6
(France) Y Mansouri	3	3
WC	(Thailand) P Kovapitukted	3	5
(India) S Yamalapalli	6	7
Q	(United Kingdom) M Xu	6	6
(Serbia) N Stevanović	1	3
Q	(United States) D Hewitt	3	1
8/SR	K Dmitruk	6	6

Second round
(France) T Andrianjafitrimo	6^{4}	6	7^{9}
(Italy) C Rosatello	7^{7}	1	6^{7}
(Japan) A Shimizu	4	2
Q	(China) W Zheng	6	6
3	(Croatia) P Marčinko	6	6
(India) S Yamalapalli	4	3
Q	(United Kingdom) M Xu
8/SR	K Dmitruk	w/o

Quarterfinals
(France) T Andrianjafitrimo	1	6	6^{5}
Q	(China) W Zheng	6	4	7^{7}
3	(Croatia) P Marčinko	4	1
8/SR	K Dmitruk	6	6

Semifinals
Q	(China) W Zheng	6	2
8/SR	K Dmitruk	3	0^{r}

=== Bottom half ===
First round
5	(China) X Yao	7^{7}	6
(China) X You	6^{2}	3
Q	(Japan) A Koshiishi	6	4	6
Q	(Hong Kong) E Chong	2	6	4
(United States) A Rogers	4	4
Q	(Kazakhstan) Z Diyas	6	6
Q	(Hong Kong) C Wong	6	3	5
4	(South Korea) S-j Jang	2	6	2^{r}
7	(Japan) M Yamaguchi	6	6
WC	(Thailand) T Naklo	0	2
(Japan) N Sato	3	3
M Tkacheva	6	6
(Greece) S Sakellaridi	7	2	3
WC	(Thailand) P Cheapchandej	5	6	6
A Tikhonova	6^{5}	4
2	(United States) M Mateas	7^{7}	6

Second round
5	(China) X Yao	6	6
Q	(Japan) A Koshiishi	0	1
Q	(Kazakhstan) Z Diyas	1	6	3
Q	(Hong Kong) C Wong	6	1	6
7	(Japan) M Yamaguchi	6^{2}	5
M Tkacheva	7^{7}	7
(Thailand) P Cheapchandej	6^{5}	0
2	(United States) M Mateas	7^{7}	6

Quarterfinals
5	(China) X Yao	6	4	6
Q	(Hong Kong) C Wong	4	6	2
M Tkacheva	7	6
2	(United States) M Mateas	5	1

Semifinals
5	(China) X Yao	7^{7}	6
M Tkacheva	6^{5}	3
