= 2024 Jiangxi Open – Singles =

Singles
- 2024 Jiangxi Open

Final
- Champion: (Switzerland) Viktorija Golubic
- Runner-up: (Slovakia) Rebecca Šramková
- Score: 6–3, 7–5

Details
- Draw: 32
- Seeds: 8

Events
Singles	Doubles
← 2023 ·	Jiangxi Open	· 2025 →

Viktorija Golubic defeated Rebecca Šramková in the final, 6–3, 7–5 to win the singles tennis title at the 2024 Jiangxi Open. It was her second WTA Tour title and first since 2016. Golubic became the lowest-ranked champion of the 2024 season (ranked at No. 168).

Kateřina Siniaková was the reigning champion, but did not participate this year.

== Seeds ==
1. (Czech Republic) Marie Bouzková (semifinals)
2. (Slovakia) Rebecca Šramková (final)
3. (Japan) Moyuka Uchijima (first round)
4. (Spain) Jéssica Bouzas Maneiro (second round, retired)
5. Kamilla Rakhimova (quarterfinals)
6. (Netherlands) Arantxa Rus (quarterfinals)
7. (Italy) Lucia Bronzetti (first round)
8. (Serbia) Olga Danilović (withdrew)

== Draw ==
=== Key ===
- Q = Qualifier
- WC = Wild card
- LL = Lucky loser
- Alt = Alternate
- ITF = ITF entry
- PR = Protected ranking
- SR = Special ranking
- SE = Special exempt
- JE = Junior exempt
- JR = Junior Accelerator Programme entrant
- CO = College Accelerator Programme entrant
- NG = Next Gen Accelerator Program entrant
- w/o = Walkover
- r = Retired
- d = Defaulted

=== Finals ===
Semifinals
1	(Czech Republic) Marie Bouzková	1	2
(Switzerland) Viktorija Golubic	6	6
(Germany) Laura Siegemund	6^{4}	2
2	(Slovakia) Rebecca Šramková	7^{7}	6

Final
(Switzerland) Viktorija Golubic	6	7
2	(Slovakia) Rebecca Šramková	3	5

=== Top half ===
First round
1	(Czech Republic) M Bouzková	7	7^{7}
(Philippines) A Eala	5	6^{4}
Q	(China) F Liu	2	1
LL	(China) X Yao	6	6
E Pridankina	6	7^{8}
(Germany) E Seidel	3	6^{6}
(Croatia) P Martić	1	6	5
5	K Rakhimova	6	4	7
4	(Spain) J Bouzas Maneiro	6	6
PR	(Kazakhstan) Z Diyas	4	2
Q	(China) X You	5	2
(Switzerland) V Golubic	7	6
(Czech Republic) L Fruhvirtová	6	7
(Liechtenstein) K von Deichmann	0	5
(Ukraine) Y Starodubtseva	4	7^{7}	3
6	(Netherlands) A Rus	6	6^{2}	6

Second round
1	(Czech Republic) M Bouzková	6	6
LL	(China) X Yao	3	3
E Pridankina	6	4	5
5	K Rakhimova	4	6	7
4	(Spain) J Bouzas Maneiro	2	0^{r}
(Switzerland) V Golubic	6	0
(Czech Republic) L Fruhvirtová	4	6^{4}
6	(Netherlands) A Rus	6	7^{7}

Quarterfinals
1	(Czech Republic) M Bouzková	6	6
5	K Rakhimova	2	2
(Switzerland) V Golubic	7	4	7^{7}
6	(Netherlands) A Rus	5	6	6^{5}

Semifinals
1	(Czech Republic) M Bouzková	1	2
(Switzerland) V Golubic	6	6

=== Bottom half ===
First round
7	(Italy) L Bronzetti	4	6	2
Q	(Thailand) M Sawangkaew	6	4	6
(Croatia) J Fett	4	6	4
WC	(China) S Zheng	6	2	6
(Germany) T Korpatsch	6	6
Q	(Indonesia) P Nugroho	0	1
(Germany) L Siegemund	7	6
3	(Japan) M Uchijima	5	3
(Hungary) A Bondár	6	2	7^{7}
(Netherlands) A Hartono	2	6	6^{3}
WC	(China) W Zheng	1	2
(Italy) M Trevisan	6	6
(Japan) M Hontama	2	6	1
(China) S Wei	6	3	6
WC	(China) S Zhang	1	1
2	(Slovakia) R Šramková	6	6

Second round
Q	(Thailand) M Sawangkaew	4	6	7^{8}
WC	(China) S Zheng	6	1	6^{6}
(Germany) T Korpatsch	4	4
(Germany) L Siegemund	6	6
(Hungary) A Bondár	6^{4}	2
(Italy) M Trevisan	7^{7}	6
(China) S Wei	5	3
2	(Slovakia) R Šramková	7	6

Quarterfinals
Q	(Thailand) M Sawangkaew	4	2
(Germany) L Siegemund	6	6
(Italy) M Trevisan	3	6	2
2	(Slovakia) R Šramková	6	3	6

Semifinals
(Germany) L Siegemund	6^{4}	2
2	(Slovakia) R Šramková	7^{7}	6

== Qualifying ==
=== Seeds ===
1. (Thailand) Mananchaya Sawangkaew (qualified)
2. (China) Yao Xinxin (qualifying competition, lucky loser)
3. (China) You Xiaodi (qualified)
4. (Kazakhstan) Zhibek Kulambayeva (first round)
5. (China) Liu Fangzhou (qualified)
6. (Mexico) María Portillo Ramírez (first round)
7. (China) Li Zongyu (first round)
8. (Thailand) Peangtarn Plipuech (first round)

=== Qualifiers ===
1. (Thailand) Mananchaya Sawangkaew
2. (China) Liu Fangzhou
3. (China) You Xiaodi
4. (Indonesia) Priska Nugroho

=== Lucky loser ===
1. (China) Yao Xinxin

=== Qualifying draw ===
==== First qualifier ====
First round
1	(Thailand) Mananchaya Sawangkaew	6	6
WC	(China) Jiang Xinyu	4	4
(United Kingdom) Eden Silva	6	2	6
7	(China) Li Zongyu	2	6	3

Qualifying competition
1	(Thailand) Mananchaya Sawangkaew	6	6
(United Kingdom) Eden Silva	1	4

==== Second qualifier ====
First round
2	(China) Yao Xinxin	3	6	7^{7}
WC	(China) Lu Jingjing	6	2	6^{4}
(China) Wang Jiaqi	3	5
5	(China) Liu Fangzhou	6	7

Qualifying competition
2	(China) Yao Xinxin	5	4
5	(China) Liu Fangzhou	7	6

==== Third qualifier ====
First round
3	(China) You Xiaodi	5
(China) Yang Yidi	0^{r}
Ekaterina Yashina	6	7^{7}
8	(Thailand) Peangtarn Plipuech	3	6^{4}

Qualifying competition
3	(China) You Xiaodi	6	7
Ekaterina Yashina	2	5

==== Fourth qualifier ====
First round
4	(Kazakhstan) Zhibek Kulambayeva	2	6^{7}
(Indonesia) Priska Nugroho	6	7^{9}
(China) Feng Shuo	7^{7}	6
6	(Mexico) María Portillo Ramírez	6^{4}	2

Qualifying competition
(Indonesia) Priska Nugroho	1	6	3
(China) Feng Shuo	6	2	0^{r}
