= 2026 Ando Securities Open – Singles =

Singles
- 2026 Ando Securities Open

Final
- Champion: (Australia) Taylah Preston
- Runner-up: (Thailand) Lanlana Tararudee
- Score: 6–1, 4–6, 6–4

Events
Singles	Doubles
- Ando Securities Open

Wakana Sonobe was the defending champion but chose not to participate.

Taylah Preston won the title, defeating Lanlana Tararudee 6–1, 4–6, 6–4 in the final.

== Seeds ==
1. (Thailand) Lanlana Tararudee (final)
2. (Japan) Himeno Sakatsume (second round)
3. (Australia) Emerson Jones (second round)
4. (China) Zhu Lin (second round)
5. (Australia) Priscilla Hon (first round)
6. (Australia) Maddison Inglis (first round)
7. (Australia) Taylah Preston (champion)
8. Polina Iatcenko (semifinals)

== Draw ==
Key

- Q = Qualifier
- WC = Wild card
- LL = Lucky loser
- Alt = Alternate
- ITF = ITF entry
- PR = Protected ranking
- SR = Special ranking
- SE = Special exempt
- JE = Junior exempt
- JR = Junior Accelerator Programme entrant
- CO = College Accelerator Programme entrant
- NG = Next Gen Accelerator Program entrant
- w/o = Walkover
- r = Retired
- d = Defaulted

=== Finals ===
Semifinals
1	(Thailand) Lanlana Tararudee	6	6
8	Polina Iatcenko	3	3
(Japan) Mai Hontama	6^{4}	3
7	(Australia) Taylah Preston	7^{7}	6

Final
1	(Thailand) Lanlana Tararudee	1	6	4
7	(Australia) Taylah Preston	6	4	6

=== Top half ===
First round
1	(Thailand) L Tararudee	3	6	6
WC	(Japan) K Sawashiro	6	2	0
Q	(Japan) N Kawaguchi	6	3	4
(Japan) M Yamaguchi	3	6	6
Q	(Japan) R Goto	4	1
(Japan) N Hibino	6	6
(Thailand) M Sawangkaew	6	6
6	(Australia) M Inglis	3	2
3	(Australia) E Jones	6	6
WC	(Japan) E Koike	4	4
(Czech Republic) G Knutson	6	6
Q	(Hong Kong) C Wong	3	4
(United States) H Inoue	6	5	6
Q	(Australia) G Da Silva-Fick	1	7	4
SR	(India) K Thandi	3	0
8	P Iatcenko	6	6

Second round
1	(Thailand) L Tararudee	6	3	6
(Japan) M Yamaguchi	4	6	3
(Japan) N Hibino	1	2
(Thailand) M Sawangkaew	6	6
3	(Australia) E Jones	4	7^{7}	6^{5}
(Czech Republic) G Knutson	6	6^{2}	7^{7}
(United States) H Inoue	6^{6}	3
8	P Iatcenko	7^{8}	6

Quarterfinals
1	(Thailand) L Tararudee	6	6
(Thailand) M Sawangkaew	2	1
(Czech Republic) G Knutson	6^{5}	6	2
8	P Iatcenko	7^{7}	4	6

Semifinals
1	(Thailand) L Tararudee	6	6
8	P Iatcenko	3	2

=== Bottom half ===
First round
5	(Australia) P Hon	2	2
Q	(Japan) Y Naito	6	6
Q	(Canada) A Arseneault	2	6	5
(Japan) M Hontama	6	1	7
WC	(Japan) H Kinoshita	6	6
(Japan) A Ito	3	3
Q	(Canada) C Zhao	3	6^{2}
4	(China) L Zhu	6	7^{7}
7	(Australia) T Preston	6	7
WC	(Japan) K Nishimura	3	5
Q	(Japan) H Kaji	6	7^{7}
(South Korea) Y-w Ku	4	6^{2}
(Australia) O Gadecki	2	5
(United Kingdom) H Dart	6	7
(China) Y Ma	3	4
2	(Japan) H Sakatsume	6	6

Second round
Q	(Japan) Y Naito	1	7^{7}	5
(Japan) M Hontama	6	6^{5}	7
WC	(Japan) H Kinoshita	6	6
4	(China) L Zhu	2	4
7	(Australia) T Preston	6	6
Q	(Japan) H Kaji	3	1
(United Kingdom) H Dart	3	6	6
2	(Japan) H Sakatsume	6	0	3

Quarterfinals
(Japan) M Hontama	6	4	7
WC	(Japan) H Kinoshita	1	6	5
7	(Australia) T Preston	6	6
(United Kingdom) H Dart	2	3

Semifinals
(Japan) M Hontama	6^{4}	3
7	(Australia) T Preston	7^{7}	6
