= 2025 Jiangxi Open – Doubles =

Doubles
- 2025 Jiangxi Open

Final
- Champions: (United States) Quinn Gleason; Elena Pridankina
- Runners-up: Ekaterina Ovcharenko (United Kingdom) Emily Webley-Smith
- Score: 6–4, 2–6, [10–6]

Details
- Draw: 16
- Seeds: 4

Events
Singles	Doubles
- Jiangxi Open

Quinn Gleason and Elena Pridankina defeated Ekaterina Ovcharenko and Emily Webley-Smith in the final, 6–4, 2–6, [10–6] to win the doubles tennis title at the 2025 Jiangxi Open. It was the first WTA Tour doubles title for Pridankina and second for Gleason.

Guo Hanyu and Moyuka Uchijima were the reigning champions, but Guo did not participate and Uchijima chose to compete in Hong Kong instead.

== Seeds ==
1. (China) Xu Yifan / (China) Yang Zhaoxuan (quarterfinals)
2. (France) Kristina Mladenovic / (Poland) Katarzyna Piter (quarterfinals)
3. (United States) Quinn Gleason / Elena Pridankina (champions)
4. (Netherlands) Isabelle Haverlag / (United Kingdom) Maia Lumsden (quarterfinals)

== Draw ==
Key

- Q = Qualifier
- WC = Wild card
- LL = Lucky loser
- Alt = Alternate
- ITF = ITF entry
- PR = Protected ranking
- SR = Special ranking
- SE = Special exempt
- JE = Junior exempt
- JR = Junior Accelerator Programme entrant
- CO = College Accelerator Programme entrant
- NG = Next Gen Accelerator Program entrant
- w/o = Walkover
- r = Retired
- d = Defaulted

=== Draw ===
First round
1	(China) Y Xu (China) Z Yang	7^{7}	6
(United States) CYS Lee (France) T Rakotomanga Rajaonah	6^{3}	3
(China) Q Ye (China) W Zheng	5	1
A Korneeva (Czech Republic) D Šalková	7	6
3	(United States) Q Gleason; E Pridankina	6	7^{7}
(Chinese Taipei) Y-y Li (China) Z Li	4	6^{5}
WC	(China) H Shi (China) X Yao	6	6
(China) Z Bai (China) Y Huang	1	3
(United Kingdom) A Barnett (France) E Lechemia	6	5	[9]
(Japan) M Ayukawa (Japan) K Morisaki	1	7	[11]
WC	(China) Y Hou (China) C Zhu	6	2	[12]
E Ovcharenko (United Kingdom) E Webley-Smith	3	6	[14]
(Chinese Taipei) I-h Cho (Chinese Taipei) Y-t Cho	2	4
2	(France) K Mladenovic (Poland) K Piter	6	6

Quarterfinals
1	(China) Y Xu (China) Z Yang	6^{9}	7^{7}	[5]
A Korneeva (Czech Republic) D Šalková	7^{11}	6^{5}	[10]
3	(United States) Q Gleason; E Pridankina	w/o
WC	(China) H Shi (China) X Yao
(Japan) M Ayukawa (Japan) K Morisaki	4	6	[10]
4	(Netherlands) I Haverlag (United Kingdom) M Lumsden	6	4	[8]
E Ovcharenko (United Kingdom) E Webley-Smith	6	1	[10]
2	(France) K Mladenovic (Poland) K Piter	4	6	[7]

Semifinals
A Korneeva (Czech Republic) D Šalková	7^{7}	5	[12]
3	(United States) Q Gleason; E Pridankina	6^{3}	7	[14]
(Japan) M Ayukawa (Japan) K Morisaki	5	6^{4}
E Ovcharenko (United Kingdom) E Webley-Smith	7	7^{7}

Final
3	(United States) Q Gleason; E Pridankina	6	2	[10]
E Ovcharenko (United Kingdom) E Webley-Smith	4	6	[6]
