= 2024 Jiangxi Open – Doubles =

Doubles
- 2024 Jiangxi Open

Final
- Champions: (China) Guo Hanyu (Japan) Moyuka Uchijima
- Runners-up: (Poland) Katarzyna Piter (Hungary) Fanny Stollár
- Score: 7–6^{(7–5)}, 7–5

Events
Singles	Doubles
← 2023 ·	Jiangxi Open	· 2025 →

Guo Hanyu and Moyuka Uchijima defeated Katarzyna Piter and Fanny Stollár in the final, 7–6^{(7–5)}, 7–5 to win the doubles tennis title at the 2024 Jiangxi Open.

Laura Siegemund and Vera Zvonareva were the reigning champions, but chose not to participate this year.

== Seeds ==
1. (Czech Republic) Marie Bouzková / (China) Zhang Shuai (quarterfinals)
2. (China) Jiang Xinyu / (Chinese Taipei) Wu Fang-hsien (quarterfinals)
3. (Italy) Angelica Moratelli / (Czech Republic) Anna Sisková (first round)
4. (Poland) Katarzyna Piter / (Hungary) Fanny Stollár (final)

== Draw ==
=== Key ===
- Q = Qualifier
- WC = Wild card
- LL = Lucky loser
- Alt = Alternate
- ITF = ITF entry
- PR = Protected ranking
- SR = Special ranking
- SE = Special exempt
- JE = Junior exempt
- JR = Junior Accelerator Programme entrant
- CO = College Accelerator Programme entrant
- NG = Next Gen Accelerator Program entrant
- w/o = Walkover
- r = Retired
- d = Defaulted

=== Draw ===
First round
1	(Czech Republic) M Bouzková (China) S Zhang	6	6
(Spain) Y Cavallé Reimers (Netherlands) A Rus	2	2
E Pridankina; E Yashina	6	5	[10]
(Kazakhstan) Z Kulambayeva (Thailand) P Plipuech	2	7	[8]
4	(Poland) K Piter (Hungary) F Stollár	6	6
(United Kingdom) S Murray Sharan (United Kingdom) E Silva	3	2
(United Kingdom) E Appleton (China) Q Tang	5	3
S Lansere; K Rakhimova	7	6
WC	(China) S Feng (China) M Wang	6	2	[10]
(China) H Guo (Japan) M Uchijima	1	6	[12]
(Netherlands) A Hartono (India) P Thombare	7	4	[10]
3	(Italy) A Moratelli (Czech Republic) A Sisková	5	6	[3]
(Hungary) A Bondár (Belgium) K Zimmermann	6	6
WC	(China) J Wang (China) W Zheng	0	4
(Japan) M Hontama (Germany) T Korpatsch	6^{2}	4
2	(China) X Jiang (Chinese Taipei) F-h Wu	7^{7}	6

Quarterfinals
1	(Czech Republic) M Bouzková (China) S Zhang	6^{4}	1
E Pridankina; E Yashina	7^{7}	6
4	(Poland) K Piter (Hungary) F Stollár	6^{4}	6	[10]
S Lansere; K Rakhimova	7^{7}	4	[8]
(China) H Guo (Japan) M Uchijima	6	6
(Netherlands) A Hartono (India) P Thombare	4	2
(Hungary) A Bondár (Belgium) K Zimmermann	1	7	[10]
2	(China) X Jiang (Chinese Taipei) F-h Wu	6	5	[5]

Semifinals
E Pridankina; E Yashina	1	3
4	(Poland) K Piter (Hungary) F Stollár	6	6
(China) H Guo (Japan) M Uchijima	6	7
(Hungary) A Bondár (Belgium) K Zimmermann	1	5

Final
4	(Poland) K Piter (Hungary) F Stollár	6^{5}	5
(China) H Guo (Japan) M Uchijima	7^{7}	7
