= 2024 Jiangxi Open =

- Date: 28 October–3 November
- Edition: 8th
- Category: WTA 250
- Draw: 32S / 16D
- Surface: Hard, outdoor
- Location: Jiujiang, China

Champions

Singles
- (Switzerland) Viktorija Golubic

Doubles
- (China) Guo Hanyu / (Japan) Moyuka Uchijima
← 2023 ·	Jiangxi Open	· 2025 →

The 2024 Jiangxi Open was a women's professional tennis tournament played on outdoor hard courts. It was the 8th edition of the event, and part of the WTA 250 tournaments of the 2024 WTA Tour. It took place in Jiujiang, China, from 28 October to 3 November 2024 (moved from Nanchang in previous editions).

== Champions ==
=== Singles ===
- (Switzerland) Viktorija Golubic def. (Slovakia) Rebecca Šramková 6–3, 7–5

=== Doubles ===
- (China) Guo Hanyu / (Japan) Moyuka Uchijima def. (Poland) Katarzyna Piter / (Hungary) Fanny Stollár 7–6^{(7–5)}, 7–5

== Singles main draw entrants ==
=== Seeds ===
Country	Player	Rank^{1}	Seed
CZE	Marie Bouzková	47	1
SVK	Rebecca Šramková	51	2
JPN	Moyuka Uchijima	57	3
ESP	Jéssica Bouzas Maneiro	60	4
	Kamilla Rakhimova	61	5
NED	Arantxa Rus	77	6
ITA	Lucia Bronzetti	84	7
~~SRB~~	~~Olga Danilović~~	~~86~~	~~8~~

- Rankings are as of 21 October 2024.

=== Other entrants ===
The following players received wildcards into the singles main draw:

- (China) Zhang Shuai
- (China) Zheng Saisai
- (China) Zheng Wushuang

The following player received entry using a protected ranking:

- (Kazakhstan) Zarina Diyas

The following players received entry from the qualifying draw:

- (China) Liu Fangzhou
- (Indonesia) Priska Nugroho
- (Thailand) Mananchaya Sawangkaew
- (China) You Xiaodi

The following player received entry as a lucky loser:

- (China) Yao Xinxin

=== Withdrawals ===
- (Romania) Irina-Camelia Begu → replaced by (Kazakhstan) Zarina Diyas
- (Romania) Jaqueline Cristian → replaced by (Czech Republic) Linda Fruhvirtová
- (Serbia) Olga Danilović → replaced by (China) Yao Xinxin
- (United Kingdom) Harriet Dart → replaced by (Germany) Tamara Korpatsch
- Veronika Kudermetova → replaced by (Croatia) Jana Fett
- (Poland) Magda Linette → replaced by (Netherlands) Arianne Hartono
- (Australia) Arina Rodionova → replaced by (China) Wei Sijia
- (United States) Katie Volynets → replaced by (Germany) Ella Seidel
- (China) Wang Yafan → replaced by (Philippines) Alexandra Eala

== Doubles main draw entrants ==
=== Seeds ===
Country	Player	Country	Player	Rank^{1}	Seed
CZE	Marie Bouzková	CHN	Zhang Shuai	78	1
CHN	Jiang Xinyu	TPE	Wu Fang-hsien	96	2
ITA	Angelica Moratelli	CZE	Anna Sisková	148	3
POL	Katarzyna Piter	HUN	Fanny Stollár	165	4

- Rankings are as of 21 October 2024

=== Other entrants ===
The following pairs received wildcards into the doubles main draw:

- (China) Feng Shuo / (China) Wang Meiling
- (China) Wang Jiaqi / (China) Zheng Wushuang
