= 2025 Jiangxi Open =

- Date: 27 October–2 November
- Edition: 9th
- Category: WTA 250
- Draw: 32S / 16D
- Prize money: $275,094
- Surface: Hard, outdoor
- Location: Jiujiang, China
- Venue: Jiujiang International Tennis Center

Champions

Singles
- Anna Blinkova

Doubles
- (United States) Quinn Gleason / Elena Pridankina
← 2024 ·	Jiangxi Open	· 2026 →

The 2025 Jiangxi Open was a women's professional tennis tournament played on outdoor hard courts. It was the 9th edition of the event, and part of the WTA 250 tournaments of the 2025 WTA Tour. It took place in Jiujiang, China, from 27 October to 2 November 2025.

== Champions ==
=== Singles ===
- Anna Blinkova def. (Austria) Lilli Tagger 6–3, 6–3

=== Doubles ===
- (United States) Quinn Gleason / Elena Pridankina def. Ekaterina Ovcharenko / (United Kingdom) Emily Webley-Smith, 6–4, 2–6, [10–6]

== Singles main draw entrants ==
=== Seeds ===
Country	Player	Rank^{1}	Seed
USA	Ann Li	44	1
SUI	Viktorija Golubic	55	2
USA	Alycia Parks	65	3
	Polina Kudermetova	75	4
KAZ	Yulia Putintseva	76	5
HUN	Anna Bondár	78	6
COL	Camila Osorio	83	7
	Anastasia Zakharova	84	8

- Rankings are as of 20 October 2025.

=== Other entrants ===
The following players received wildcards into the singles main draw:

- (Austria) Lilli Tagger
- (China) Zheng Wushuang
- (China) Zhu Chenting
- (China) Zhu Lin

The following players received entry using a protected ranking:

- (China) Bai Zhuoxuan
- Alina Korneeva
- (United States) Claire Liu

The following players received entry from the qualifying draw:

- Aliona Falei
- (China) Guo Hanyu
- (France) Chloé Paquet
- (Japan) Rina Saigo

The following player received entry as a lucky loser:

- Elena Pridankina

=== Withdrawals ===
- (Belgium) Greet Minnen → replaced by Alina Korneeva
- Liudmila Samsonova → replaced by (Germany) Tamara Korpatsch
- (Germany) Laura Siegemund → replaced by (Czech Republic) Dominika Šalková
- (Slovakia) Rebecca Šramková → replaced by (Japan) Ena Shibahara
- (United States) Katie Volynets → replaced by Elena Pridankina

== Doubles main draw entrants ==
=== Seeds ===
Country	Player	Country	Player	Rank^{1}	Seed
CHN	Xu Yifan	CHN	Yang Zhaoxuan	89	1
FRA	Kristina Mladenovic	POL	Katarzyna Piter	106	2
USA	Quinn Gleason		Elena Pridankina	144	3
NED	Isabelle Haverlag	GBR	Maia Lumsden	153	4

- Rankings are as of 20 October 2025

=== Other entrants ===
The following pairs received wildcards into the doubles main draw:

- (China) Hou Yanan / (China) Zhu Chenting
- (China) Shi Han / (China) Yao Xinxin

=== Withdrawals ===
- Anna Blinkova / Polina Kudermetova → not replaced
