= 2025 ITF Nonthaburi 2 – Doubles =

Doubles
- 2025 ITF Nonthaburi 2

Final
- Champion: (South Korea) Jang Su-jeong (China) Zheng Wushuang
- Runner-up: (India) Rutuja Bhosale (Hong Kong) Eudice Chong
- Score: 4–6, 6–0, [10–6]

Events
Singles	Doubles
← 2024 ·	ITF Nonthaburi 2	· 2026 →

Anna Sisková and Ksenia Zaytseva are the defending champions, but they chose not to participate.

Jang Su-jeong and Zheng Wushuang won the title, defeating Rutuja Bhosale and Eudice Chong in the final; 4–6, 6–0, [10–6].

== Seeds ==
1. (United States) Dalayna Hewitt / (United States) Anna Rogers (quarterfinals)
2. (China) Feng Shuo / (Greece) Sapfo Sakellaridi (quarterfinals)
3. (India) Rutuja Bhosale / (Hong Kong) Eudice Chong (final)
4. (United Kingdom) Alicia Barnett / (India) Prarthana Thombare (quarterfinals)

== Draw ==
=== Key ===
- Q = Qualifier
- WC = Wild card
- LL = Lucky loser
- Alt = Alternate
- SE = Special exempt
- PR = Protected ranking
- ITF = ITF entry
- JE = Junior exempt
- w/o = Walkover
- r = Retired
- d = Defaulted
- SR = Special ranking

=== Draw ===
First round
1	(United States) D Hewitt (United States) A Rogers	6	7^{7}
(Thailand) T Naklo (Thailand) B Thamchaiwat	3	6^{4}
(South Korea) S-j Jang (China) W Zheng	6	6
A Gureva; E Yashina	4	2
4	(United Kingdom) A Barnett (India) P Thombare	6	6
(Algeria) I Ibbou (Switzerland) N Karamoko	3	3
WC	(Thailand) V Deeperm (Thailand) L Kumhom	2	1
(Thailand) P Cheapchandej (Thailand) P Kovapitukted	6	6
(Japan) H Kuwata (Japan) N Sato	6	6
(Italy) C Rosatello (Serbia) N Stevanović	3	4
(United States) M Mateas (United States) A Smith	4	6	[1]
3	(India) R Bhosale (Hong Kong) E Chong	6	1	[10]
(Chinese Taipei) I-h Cho (Chinese Taipei) Y-t Cho	2	3
(Kazakhstan) Z Diyas; M Tkacheva	6	6
(Japan) M Kobori (Japan) A Shimizu	6	1	[6]
2	(China) S Feng (Greece) S Sakellaridi	4	6	[10]

Quarterfinals
1	(United States) D Hewitt (United States) A Rogers	6^{3}	7	[4]
(South Korea) S-j Jang (China) W Zheng	7^{7}	5	[10]
4	(United Kingdom) A Barnett (India) P Thombare	4	6	[7]
(Thailand) P Cheapchandej (Thailand) P Kovapitukted	6	3	[10]
(Japan) H Kuwata (Japan) N Sato	5	7^{14}	[7]
3	(India) R Bhosale (Hong Kong) E Chong	7	6^{12}	[10]
(Kazakhstan) Z Diyas; M Tkacheva	6	7
2	(China) S Feng (Greece) S Sakellaridi	3	5

Semifinals
(South Korea) S-j Jang (China) W Zheng	6	2	[10]
(Thailand) P Cheapchandej (Thailand) P Kovapitukted	4	6	[3]
3	(India) R Bhosale (Hong Kong) E Chong	6	5	[10]
(Kazakhstan) Z Diyas; M Tkacheva	4	7	[5]

Final
(South Korea) S-j Jang (China) W Zheng	4	6	[10]
3	(India) R Bhosale (Hong Kong) E Chong	6	0	[6]
