= Xiao Zhenghua =

Chinese tennis player (born 2002)

- Country (sports): China
- Born: 1 September 2002 (age 24)
- Plays: Right (two-handed backhand)
- Prize money: $19,805

Singles
- Career record: 55–62
- Highest ranking: No. 802 (29 July 2019)

Doubles
- Career record: 84–60
- Career titles: 9 ITF
- Highest ranking: No. 240 (24 February 2026)

Xiao Zhenghua (born 1 September 2002) is a Chinese inactive tennis player.

Xiao has a career-high doubles ranking by the WTA of No. 240, achieved on 24 February 2024. She has won nine doubles titles on the ITF World Tennis Tour.

Xiao won her first W50 title at the Jinan Open in the doubles draw, partnering with Guo Meiqi.

== ITF Circuit finals ==
=== Doubles: 14 (9 titles, 5 runner-ups) ===
Legend W50 tournaments W35 tournaments W15 tournaments	Finals by surface Hard (9–3) Clay (0–2)

Result	W–L	Date	Tournament	Tier	Surface	Partner	Opponents	Score
Win	1–0	Feb 2024	ITF Nakhon Si Thammarat, Thailand	W15	Hard	(China) Guo Meiqi	(China) Yao Xinxin (China) Zheng Wushuang	6–3, 6–4
Loss	1–1	Mar 2024	ITF Ipoh, Malaysia	W15	Clay	(China) Guo Meiqi	(Chinese Taipei) Cho I-hsuan (Chinese Taipei) Cho Yi-tsen	4–6, 2–6
Loss	1–2	Mar 2024	ITF Monastir, Tunisia	W15	Clay	(China) Aitiyaguli Aixirefu	(Japan) Hiromi Abe (Japan) Natsuho Arakawa	6–3, 6–7^{(3)}, [3–10]
Win	2–2	Jun 2024	ITF Monastir, Tunisia	W15	Hard	(China) Xu Jiayu	(India) Zeel Desai (Switzerland) Naïma Karamoko	7–6^{(7)}, 7–5
Win	3–2	Jun 2024	ITF Luzhou, China	W35	Hard	(China) Huang Yujia	(China) Sun Yufan (China) Wang Meiling	7–6^{(5)}, 6–0
Win	4–2	Jul 2024	ITF Tianjin, China	W35	Hard	(China) Guo Meiqi	(Japan) Sakura Hosogi (Japan) Misaki Matsuda	6–4, 6–2
Win	5–2	Aug 2024	Jinan Open, China	W50	Hard	(China) Guo Meiqi	(China) Feng Shuo (China) Liu Fangzhou	6–3, 1–6, [10–5]
Loss	5–3	Oct 2024	ITF Huzhou, China	W35	Hard	(China) Ye Qiuyu	Sofya Lansere; Ekaterina Shalimova	2–6, 3–6
Win	6–3	Jan 2025	ITF La Marsa, Tunisia	W50	Hard	(China) Yuan Chengyiyi	Anastasia Gasanova; Anastasia Zolotareva	2–6, 7–5, [10–8]
Win	7–3	Jan 2025	ITF La Marsa, Tunisia	W50	Hard	(China) Guo Meiqi	(Spain) Ángela Fita Boluda (Switzerland) Ylena In-Albon	6–3, 6–4
Loss	7–4	Jan 2025	ITF Monastir, Tunisia	W15	Hard	(China) Guo Meiqi	(Japan) Hiromi Abe (Japan) Mayuka Aikawa	3–6, 0–6
Win	8–4	Feb 2025	ITF Monastir, Tunisia	W15	Hard	(China) Guo Meiqi	(United States) Sara Daavettila (Greece) Martha Matoula	4–6, 7–6^{(5)}, [10–8]
Win	9–4	Aug 2025	ITF Lu'an, China	W15	Hard	(China) Huang Yujia	(China) Wang Jiaqi (China) Yuan Chengyiyi	6–1, 6–4
Loss	9–5	Aug 2025	ITF Lu'an, China	W15	Hard	(China) Huang Yujia	(South Korea) Kim Da-bin (South Korea) Lin Fang-an	7–5, 3–6, [5–10]
