= Guo Meiqi =

Chinese tennis player

- Country (sports): China
- Born: 9 January 2000 (age 26) Guangzhou, China
- Plays: Right (two-handed backhand)
- Prize money: $89,649

Singles
- Career record: 201–145
- Career titles: 4 ITF
- Highest ranking: No. 434 (25 August 2025)
- Current ranking: No. 622 (24 August 2026)

Doubles
- Career record: 129–94
- Career titles: 11 ITF
- Highest ranking: No. 271 (17 February 2025)
- Current ranking: No. 473 (24 August 2026)
- Last updated on: 29 August 2026.

Guo Meiqi
- Chinese: 郭美琪
Transcriptions
Standard Mandarin
- Hanyu Pinyin: Guō Měiqí
- IPA: [kwó mèɪ tɕʰǐ]
Yue: Cantonese
- Jyutping: Gwok3 Mei5kei4
- IPA: [kʷɔk̚˧ mej˩˧ kʰej˩]

Guo Meiqi (Chinese: 郭美琪; pinyin: Guō Měiqí; Jyutping: Gwok3 Mei5kei4; born 9 January 2000) is a Chinese tennis player.

She has career-high WTA rankings of 434 in singles, reached in August 2025, and 271 in doubles, achieved on 17 February 2025.

Guo made her WTA Tour main-draw debut at the 2017 Guangzhou Open in the doubles draw, partnering Sun Xuliu.

Guo is best known for losing to Hanna Chang in 2026 at the W35 Andong event, where her opponent was unable to run the entire match. Guo showcased her inability to simply aim the ball from one side of the court to the other. She instead chose to hit backhands directly to her opponent, losing the match to an opponent on one leg.

== ITF Circuit finals ==
=== Singles: 8 (4 titles, 4 runner-ups) ===
Legend W35 tournaments W15 tournaments	Finals by surface Hard (3–3) Clay (1–1)

Result	W–L	Date	Tournament	Tier	Surface	Opponent	Score
Win	1–0	Sep 2018	ITF Anning, China	W15	Clay	(China) Sun Ziyue	6–1, 6–1
Loss	1–1	Mar 2019	ITF Xiamen, China	W15	Hard	(Denmark) Clara Tauson	6–2, 3–6, 2–6
Loss	1–2	Sep 2019	ITF Anning, China	W15	Clay	(China) Zheng Wushuang	6–7^{(7)}, 3–6
Win	2–2	May 2025	ITF Maanshan, China	W15	Hard (i)	(China) Liu Fangzhou	5–3 ret.
Loss	2–3	Jun 2025	ITF Ma'anshan, China	W15	Hard (i)	(China) Zhu Chenting	2–6, 4–6
Win	3–3	Jul 2025	ITF Lu'an, China	W15	Hard	(United States) Anne Christine Lutkemeyer	4–6, 6–0, 6–4
Win	4–3	Jul 2025	ITF Lu'an, China	W15	Hard	(China) Chen Mengyi	6–0, 6–2
Loss	4–4	Jun 2026	ITF Ma'anshan, China	W15	Hard (i)	Evialina Laskevich	1–6, 6–4, 1–6

=== Doubles: 22 (12 titles, 10 runner-ups) ===
Legend W50 tournaments W35 tournaments W15 tournaments	Finals by surface Hard (10–7) Clay (2–3)

Result	W–L	Date	Tournament	Tier	Surface	Partner	Opponents	Score
Win	1–0	Mar 2019	ITF Nanchang, China	W15	Clay (i)	(China) Cao Siqi	(China) Guo Hanyu (China) Tang Qianhui	6–4, 4–6, [10–8]
Loss	1–1	May 2019	ITF Wuhan, China	W25	Hard	(China) Wu Meixu	(China) Li Yihong (China) Xin Yuan	6–7^{(3)}, 2–6
Win	2–1	Jun 2019	ITF Naiman, China	W25	Hard	(China) Wu Meixu	(China) Jiang Xinyu (Japan) Erika Sema	6–4, 7–6^{(5)}
Win	3–1	Sep 2019	ITF Anning, China	W15	Clay	(China) Zhao Qianqian	(Japan) Ayaka Okuno (United States) Holly Verner	7–6^{(5)}, 7–6^{(5)}
Loss	3–2	Feb 2020	ITF Antalya, Turkey	W15	Clay	(China) Han Jiangxue	(Colombia) Yuliana Lizarazo (Italy) Aurora Zantedeschi	2–6, 7–5, [4–10]
Loss	3–3	Mar 2023	ITF Kuching, Malaysia	W15	Hard	(China) Feng Shuo	(China) Guo Hanyu (Chinese Taipei) Li Yu-yun	2–6, 3–6
Loss	3–4	Apr 2023	ITF Singapur	W15	Hard	(Chinese Taipei) Lin Li-hsin	(China) Liu Yanni (China) Ren Yufei	1–6, 5–7
Loss	3–5	May 2023	ITF Kursumlijska Banja, Serbia	W15	Clay	(China) Wang Meiling	(Australia) Elena Micic (Serbia) Anja Stanković	2–6, 4–6
Loss	3–6	Jun 2023	ITF Kursumlijska Banja	W15	Clay	(Serbia) Iva Sepa	(Poland) Zuzanna Bednarz (Ukraine) Daria Yesypchuk	6–7^{(4)}, 6–4, [8–10]
Win	4–6	Feb 2024	ITF Nakhon Si; Thammarat, Thailand	W15	Hard	(China) Xiao Zhenghua	(China) Yao Xinxin (China) Zheng Wushuang	6–3, 6–4
Loss	4–7	Mar 2024	ITF Ipoh, Malaysia	W15	Clay	(China) Xiao Zhenghua	(Chinese Taipei) Cho I-hsuan (Chinese Taipei) Cho Yi-tsen	4–6, 2–6
Win	5–7	Jul 2024	ITF Tianjin, China	W35	Hard	(China) Xiao Zhenghua	(Japan) Sakura Hosogi (Japan) Misaki Matsuda	6–4, 6–2
Win	6–7	Jul 2024	ITF Naiman, China	W35	Hard	(China) Huang Yujia	(China) Lu Jingjing (China) Ye Qiuyu	6–3, 3–6, [13–11]
Win	7–7	Aug 2024	Jinan Open, China	W50	Hard	(China) Xiao Zhenghua	(China) Feng Shuo (China) Liu Fangzhou	6–3, 1–6, [10–5]
Win	8–7	Jan 2025	ITF La Marsa, Tunisia	W50	Hard	(China) Xiao Zhenghua	(Spain) Ángela Fita Boluda (Switzerland) Ylena In-Albon	6–3, 6–4
Loss	8–8	Jan 2025	ITF Monastir, Tunisia	W15	Hard	(China) Xiao Zhenghua	(Japan) Hiromi Abe (Japan) Mayuka Aikawa	3–6, 0–6
Win	9–8	Feb 2025	ITF Monastir, Tunisia	W15	Hard	(China) Xiao Zhenghua	(United States) Sara Daavettila (Greece) Martha Matoula	4–6, 7–6^{(5)}, [10–8]
Loss	9–9	May 2025	ITF Maanshan, China	W15	Hard (i)	(Thailand) Peangtarn Plipuech	(Kazakhstan) Sandugash Kenzhibayeva; Sofya Lansere	3–6, 6–3, [8–10]
Win	10–9	May 2026	ITF Changwon, South Korea	W35	Hard	(South Korea) Back Da-yeon	(United States) Hanna Chang (South Korea) Jang Ga-eul	7–5, 7–5
Win	11–9	Jun 2026	ITF Maanshan, China	W15	Hard (i)	(China) Zhu Chenting	(China) Li Yuyao (China) Luo Xi	6–7^{(2)}, 6–1, [10–4]
Win	12–9	Sep 2026	ITF Guiyang, China	W50	Hard	(China) Yang Yidi	(Japan) Hiroko Kuwata (Japan) Eri Shimizu	4–6, 6–3, [10–8]
Loss	12–10	Oct 2026	ITF Kunshan, China	W35	Hard	(China) Yang Yidi	(China) Huang Yujia; Daria Zelinskaya	4–6, 4–6
