= 2025 ITF Nonthaburi 2 =

Tennis tournament

- Date: 6–12 January 2025
- Edition: 6th
- Category: ITF Women's World Tennis Tour
- Prize money: $60,000
- Surface: Hard / Outdoor
- Location: Nonthaburi, Thailand

2024 Champions

Singles
- (Thailand) Mananchaya Sawangkaew

Doubles
- (Czech Republic) Anna Sisková / Ksenia Zaytseva
← 2024 ·	ITF Nonthaburi 2	· 2026 →

The 2025 ITF Nonthaburi 2 was a professional tennis tournament played on outdoor hard courts. It was the sixth edition of the tournament, which was part of the 2025 ITF Women's World Tennis Tour. It took place in Nonthaburi, Thailand, 6 and 12 January 2025.

== Champions ==
=== Singles ===
- (China) Yao Xinxin vs. (China) Zheng Wushuang 6–4, 6–0

=== Doubles ===
- (South Korea) Jang Su-jeong / (China) Zheng Wushuang vs. (India) Rutuja Bhosale / (Hong Kong) Eudice Chong 4–6, 6–0, [10–6]

== Singles main draw entrants ==
=== Seeds ===
Country	Player	Rank	Seed
CHN	Ma Yexin	236	1
USA	Maria Mateas	244	2
CRO	Petra Marčinko	258	3
KOR	Jang Su-jeong	261	4
CHN	Yao Xinxin	265	5
CHN	Lu Jiajing	275	6
JPN	Mei Yamaguchi	276	7
	Kristina Dmitruk	283	8

- Rankings are as of 30 December 2024.

=== Other entrants ===
The following players received wildcards into the singles main draw:

- (Thailand) Patcharin Cheapchandej
- (Thailand) Anchisa Chanta
- (Thailand) Punnin Kovapitukted
- (Thailand) Thasaporn Naklo

The following players received entry from the qualifying draw:

- (Hong Kong) Eudice Chong
- (Kazakhstan) Zarina Diyas
- (United States) Dalayna Hewitt
- (Japan) Ayumi Koshiishi
- (Japan) Hiroko Kuwata
- (Hong Kong) Cody Wong
- (United Kingdom) Mingge Xu
- (China) Zheng Wushuang
