= 2026 Ando Securities Open =

Tennis tournament

- Date: 20–26 April 2026
- Edition: 9th
- Category: ITF Women's World Tennis Tour
- Prize money: $100,000
- Surface: Hard / Outdoor
- Location: Tokyo, Japan

Champions

Singles
- (Australia) Taylah Preston

Doubles
- (Australia) Alexandra Osborne / (Hong Kong) Cody Wong
- Ando Securities Open

The 2026 Ando Securities Open was a professional tennis tournament played on outdoor hard courts. It was the ninth edition of the tournament, which was part of the 2026 ITF Women's World Tennis Tour. It took place in Tokyo, Japan, between 20 and 26 April 2026.

== Champions ==
=== Singles ===
- (Australia) Taylah Preston def. (Thailand) Lanlana Tararudee, 6–1, 4–6, 6–4

=== Doubles ===
- (Australia) Alexandra Osborne / (Hong Kong) Cody Wong def. (Hong Kong) Eudice Chong / (Chinese Taipei) Liang En-shuo, 3–6, 7–5, [10–7]

== Singles main draw entrants ==
=== Seeds ===
Country	Player	Rank	Seed
THA	Lanlana Tararudee	115	1
JPN	Himeno Sakatsume	132	2
AUS	Emerson Jones	133	3
CHN	Zhu Lin	136	4
AUS	Priscilla Hon	138	5
AUS	Maddison Inglis	140	6
AUS	Taylah Preston	151	7
	Polina Iatcenko	160	8

- Rankings are as of 13 April 2026.

=== Other entrants ===
The following players received wildcards into the singles main draw:

- (Japan) Hayu Kinoshita
- (Japan) Ena Koike
- (Japan) Kayo Nishimura
- (Japan) Kanon Sawashiro

The following player received entry into the singles main draw using a special ranking:

- (India) Karman Thandi

The following players received entry from the qualifying draw:

- (Canada) Ariana Arseneault
- (Australia) Gabriella Da Silva-Fick
- (Japan) Reina Goto
- (Japan) Haruka Kaji
- (Japan) Natsumi Kawaguchi
- (Japan) Yuki Naito
- (Hong Kong) Cody Wong
- (Canada) Carol Zhao
