= Eudice Chong =

Hong Kong tennis player

Eudice Chong 張瑋桓
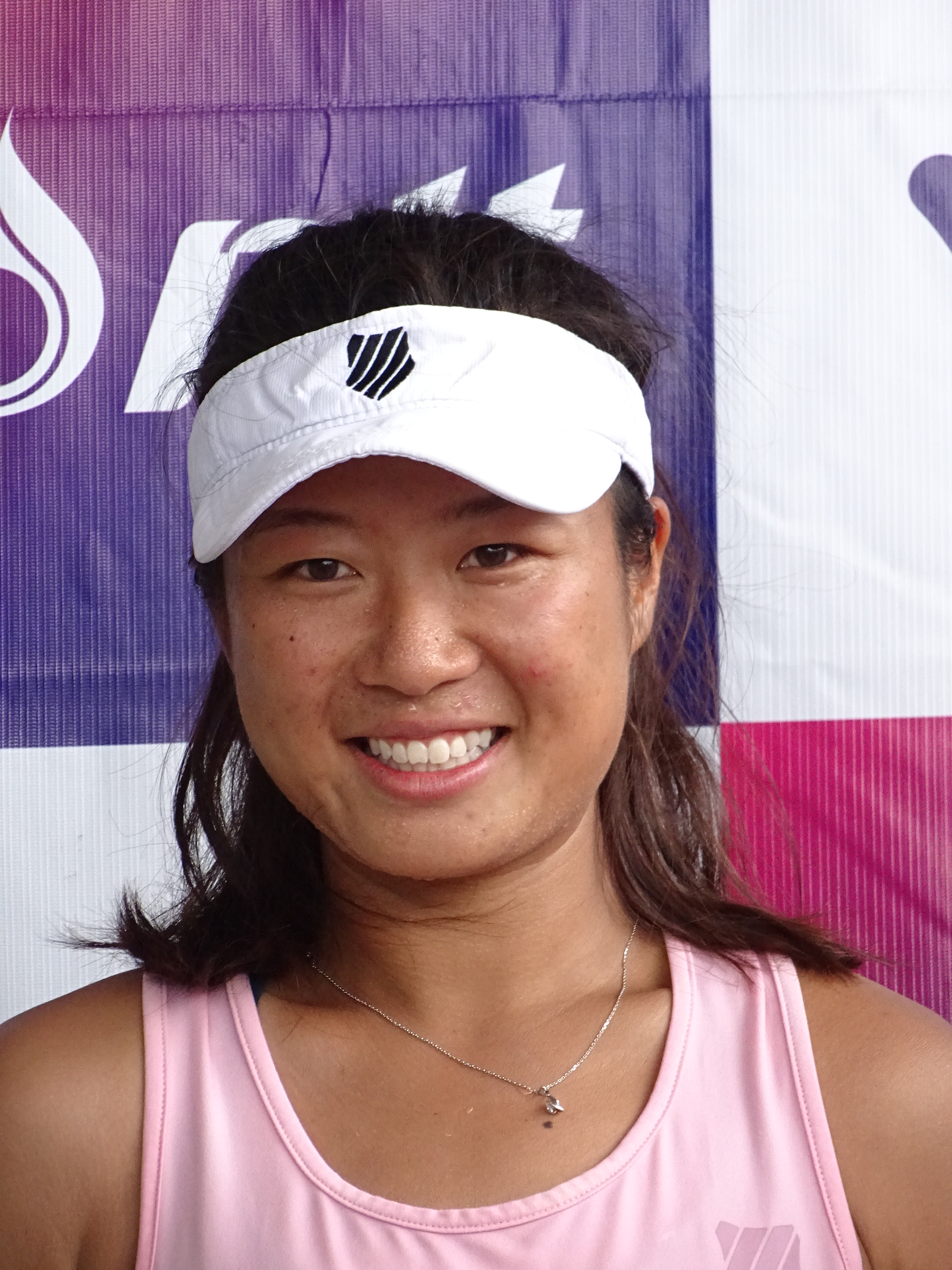
- Country (sports): Hong Kong
- Born: 22 April 1996 (age 30) New York, United States
- College: Wesleyan University
- Prize money: $360,455

Singles
- Career record: 235–174
- Career titles: 6 ITF
- Highest ranking: No. 213 (26 December 2022)
- Current ranking: No. 900 (14 September 2026)

Grand Slam singles results
- Australian Open: Q1 (2023)

Doubles
- Career record: 288–135
- Career titles: 1 WTA, 3 Challenger
- Highest ranking: No. 57 (29 June 2026)
- Current ranking: No. 58 (14 September 2026)

Grand Slam doubles results
- French Open: 3R (2026)
- Wimbledon: 2R (2026)
- US Open: 2R (2026)

Team competitions
- Fed Cup: 28–13
Medal record
Representing Hong Kong
Women's Tennis
Asian Games
Bronze medal – third place	2026 Aichi–Nagoya	Doubles
Summer Universiade
Bronze medal – third place	2019 Naples	Singles
Bronze medal – third place	2019 Naples	Doubles
- Last updated on: 16 September 2026.

Eudice Chong (born 22 April 1996) is a professional tennis player from Hong Kong.

She reached her career-high WTA rankings of No. 213 in singles and No. 57 in doubles on 26 December 2022 and 27 July 2026, respectively. Chong was the first tennis player from Hong Kong to win a doubles title in the WTA tour, and the second tennis player to rank inside top 100 of the world, since Patricia Hy-Boulais in 1987.

Chong has won six singles and 38 doubles titles, including one in WTA 250 tournaments, three in WTA 125 tournaments and 34 on the ITF Circuit. She held the record of having the most titles among Hong Kong players.

Chong partnered with Veronika Erjavec and reached the third round at the 2026 French Open, which is the best ever result for Hong Kong players in the French Open. She also partnered with Anastasia Tikhonova and reached the second round at the 2026 Wimbledon, which is also the best ever result for Hong Kong players in the Wimbledon during the Open era.

She represented Hong Kong at the Asian Games (2014, 2018, 2023 and 2026), All China Games (2013, 2017, 2021 and 2025), Asian Championships (2013), World University Games (2015, 2017, and 2019), and Fed Cup (2012-2014, 2017-2019, 2022, 2024-2025).

== Juniors ==
She started competing in Junior Novice competitions in fifth grade in 2006 and won the Comp 3 under-10 and Comp 4 under-12 singles before attending the Talent Group trials that earned her a selection.

She then captured the under-12 girls' singles title at the Hong Kong National Junior Tennis Championships 2008 by beating Caroline Lampl, who went on to win three NCAA championships with Stanford University.

At age 16, Chong added the Hong Kong National Junior Tennis Championships 2012 under-18 girls' singles title. In 2010 and 2011, she claimed back-to-back CRC Open 18 & Under School Girls' Open Singles Championship titles. She was selected to represent Hong Kong in the under-14 WJT events in 2010 and 2011, as well as the under-16 Junior Fed Cup competitions in 2012 and 2013. She competed on the ITF Junior Circuit, capturing two singles and seven doubles titles and peaked at a career-high No. 200 (6 January 2014) in the world.

== Collegiate years ==
When Chong arrived in Connecticut in 2014, Wesleyan had only made it to the NCAA tournament just once in its program's 42-year history. Moreover, the school had yet to produce an individual national champion. In her freshman year, Chong defeated Joulia Likhanskaia (Bowdoin College) to win the NCAA Division III women's singles championship. In 2016, she beat Juli Raventos (Williams College) to repeat as champion. In 2017, Chong saw off the challenge of Rebecca Ho (Washington University in St. Louis) to three-peat. Then, in her senior year in 2018, she defeated Victoria Yu (Wesleyan University) to become the first player, man or woman, in NCAA tennis history to capture four straight singles titles at any division of collegiate tennis.

Chong was then named the Division III Honda Athlete of the Year. Inaugurated in 1976 for Division I athletes, followed by Divisions II and III in 1988, Chong is only the third tennis player in history to receive the Honda Athlete of the Year Award accolade among all divisions.

Chong was presented with this honor at THE Collegiate Women Sports Awards (CWSA) presented by Honda that was telecasted live on the CBS Sports Network on June 25, 2018 from the Founders' Room at the Galen Center on the campus of the University of Southern California in downtown Los Angeles. The honor was voted on by national balloting among 1,000 NCAA member schools as part of the Collegiate Women Sports Awards program since 1976.

She was named Division III ITA National Senior Player of the Year and finished her career at Wesleyan as the all-time leader in singles wins, in addition to her four first-team All-Americas in both singles and doubles, and three NESCAC Player of the Year honors. Chong also led her team to three consecutive NCAA tournaments from 2016 to 2018. In 2015, her freshman year, she became the first Wesleyan women's tennis player in program history to compete in the individual NCAA Championships.

All four years, she held the year-end Division III No. 1 ranking and was a four-time selection to the ITA Collegiate All-Star Team, which featured the nation's top-ranked men and women from the year-end Oracle/ITA Collegiate Tennis Rankings, in addition to winners of the Oracle ITA National Fall Championships and NCAA Division I and III Championships.

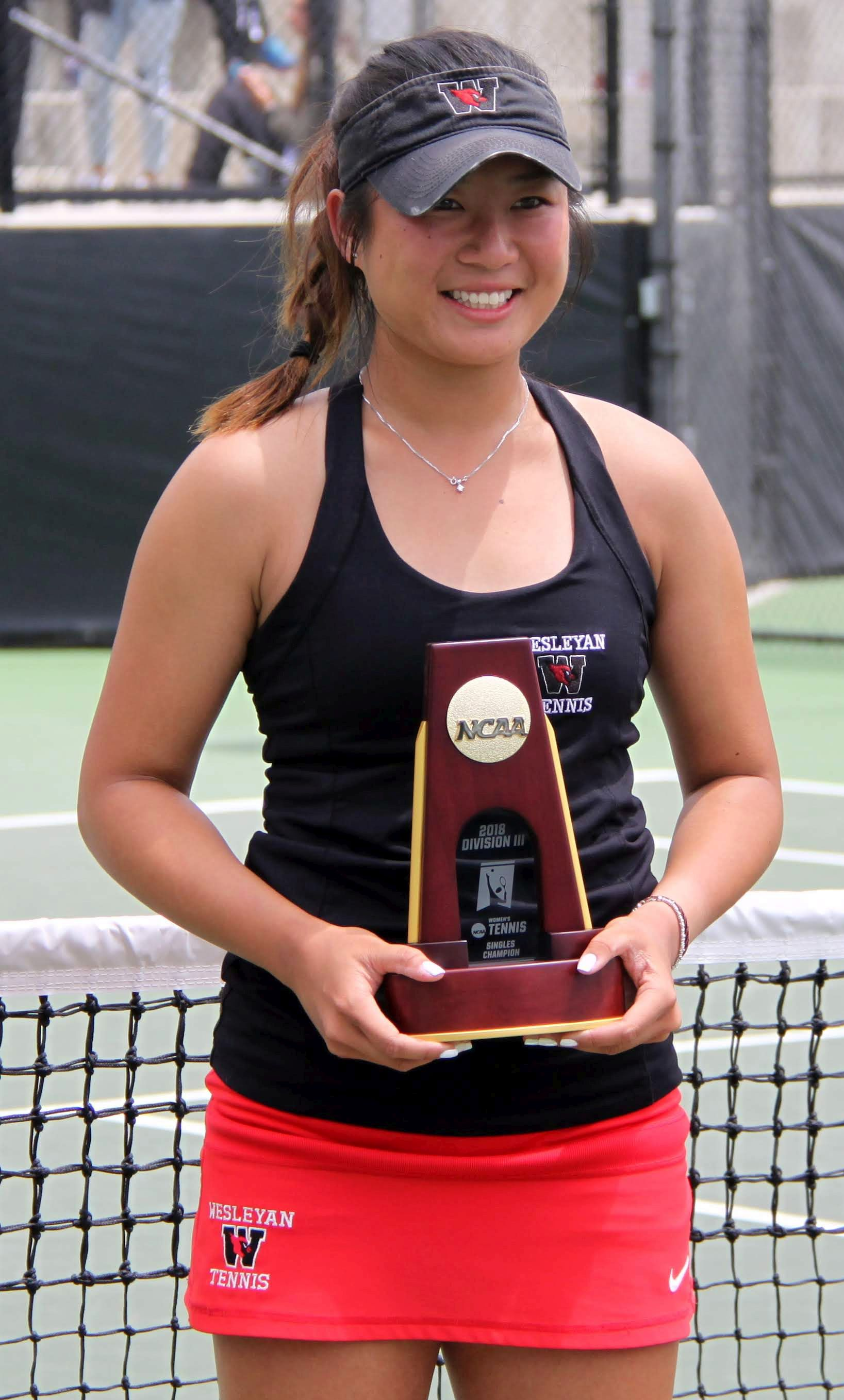
Eudice Chong wins record-setting fourth straight NCAA DIII women's singles championship.

Prior to Chong's exploits, Principia's Courtney Allen (1984–85), Menlo's Caroline Bodart (1988–89), Methodist's Elena Blanina (2001–02), and Emory's Mary Ellen Gordon (2003–04) were the only players to win two successive Division III women's singles titles. In Division I, Patty Fendick (Stanford, 1986–87), Lisa Raymond (Florida, 1992–93), Laura Granville (Stanford, 2000–01), Amber Liu (Stanford, 2003–04), and Nicole Gibbs (Stanford, 2012–13) were the only players who managed back-to-back singles titles.

The only player in college history with three consecutive national singles titles was Malcolm Chace in Division I where he claimed men's singles in 1893 representing Brown and again in 1894 and 1895 when he played for Yale.

At the 2017 ITA Oracle Cup (formerly the ITA National Small College Championships) at Indian Wells, Chong defeated Ysabel Gonzalez Rico (Emory) to win the Division III women's singles and then teamed up with Victoria Yu (Wesleyan) to beat Ysabel Gonzalez Rico and Bridget Harding (Emory), 6–1, 6–1, to win the Division III women's doubles. The duo then saw off NAIA champions Megan Bianco and Daniela Farfan (Keiser), 6–1, 6–2, and Division II winners Hanna Volikova and Alina Kislitskaya (Indianapolis) to win the Women's Doubles Championship, which automatically secured them a berth in the ITA Fall National Championships.

At the Oracle ITA National Fall Championships, Chong and Yu then knocked out sixth-seeded Jessie Aney and Alexa Graham (North Carolina), 6–3, 6–3, in the opening round, and then eliminated another Division I pair, Mami Adachi and Akvile Parazinskaite (Kentucky), before they were upended by Alexa Bortles and Arianne Hartono (Ole Miss), 6–2, 6–2, in the quarterfinals. Hartono, as it turned out, would go on to win the 2018 NCAA Division I singles title.

At the 2015 USTA/ITA National Small College Championships, Chong defeated Ashnaa Rao (Johns Hopkins), 6–1, 6–1, to win the Division III women's singles and then partnered teammate Victoria Yu to beat Bridget Harding and Katarina Su (Emory), 6–0, 6–1, to claim the doubles.

Chong graduated from Wesleyan University with a Psychology major and a minor in Asian Studies. A number of Division I schools, including Harvard, Dartmouth, and Georgetown showed interest in her early in the recruitment process, but her motivation to experience the unique and academically challenging college life of a small liberal arts school eventually saw her commit to Wesleyan.

== Professional ==
In June 2018, she embarked on a career as a full-time touring professional following her graduation. At the World University Games in Naples, Italy, in 2019, Chong captured a bronze medal in women's singles and women's doubles. In the process, she became the first tennis player from Hong Kong to medal in singles and the first to capture two tennis medals at the same Universiade.

With the global pandemic adversely impacting the ITF Women's World Tennis Tour, the latter part of 2020 saw Chong make a concerted assault on the local tournaments in Hong Kong. She became the first player to equal Paulette Moreno's feat of winning the ladies' singles, ladies' doubles, and mixed doubles titles simultaneously at both the CRC Open and the Hong Kong National Tennis Championships in the same calendar year, a record that had stood untouched for 36 years.

=== WTA Tour: Hong Kong main-draw debut, Thailand doubles finalist ===
Chong made her debut at the 2016 Hong Kong Tennis Open when she was awarded a wildcard for the qualifying draw. With a modest WTA ranking of No. 995, she managed to come from a set down to beat 201st-ranked Shuko Aoyama, before she was ousted by No. 164 Tereza Martincová of the Czech Republic.

In 2018, now ranked No. 590, she was given a main draw wildcard and faced 145th-ranked American Christina McHale. Trailing by a break and 5–3, Chong rallied to win three games in succession to force a tiebreak, before claiming seven points in a row from 2–0 down to grab the breaker. However, the former world No. 24 made the necessary adjustments and tidied up her wayward groundstrokes to progress, 6–7, 6–2, 6–1.

She also competed in the doubles and was given a main-draw wildcard in 2016 (w/Katherine Ip) and 2018 (w/Zhang Ling) but went out in the first round to Nao Hibino / Alexandrina Naydenova and Alizé Cornet / Zheng Saisai, respectively.

In September 2024, at the WTA 250 2024 Thailand Open 2, Chong reached her first WTA Tour doubles final, partnering with Moyuka Uchijima, but lost to top seeds Anna Danilina and Irina Khromacheva in the championship match. She received a wildcard for the singles main draw at her home tournament, the 2024 Hong Kong Tennis Open but lost to Priscilla Hon.

=== ITF Circuit ===
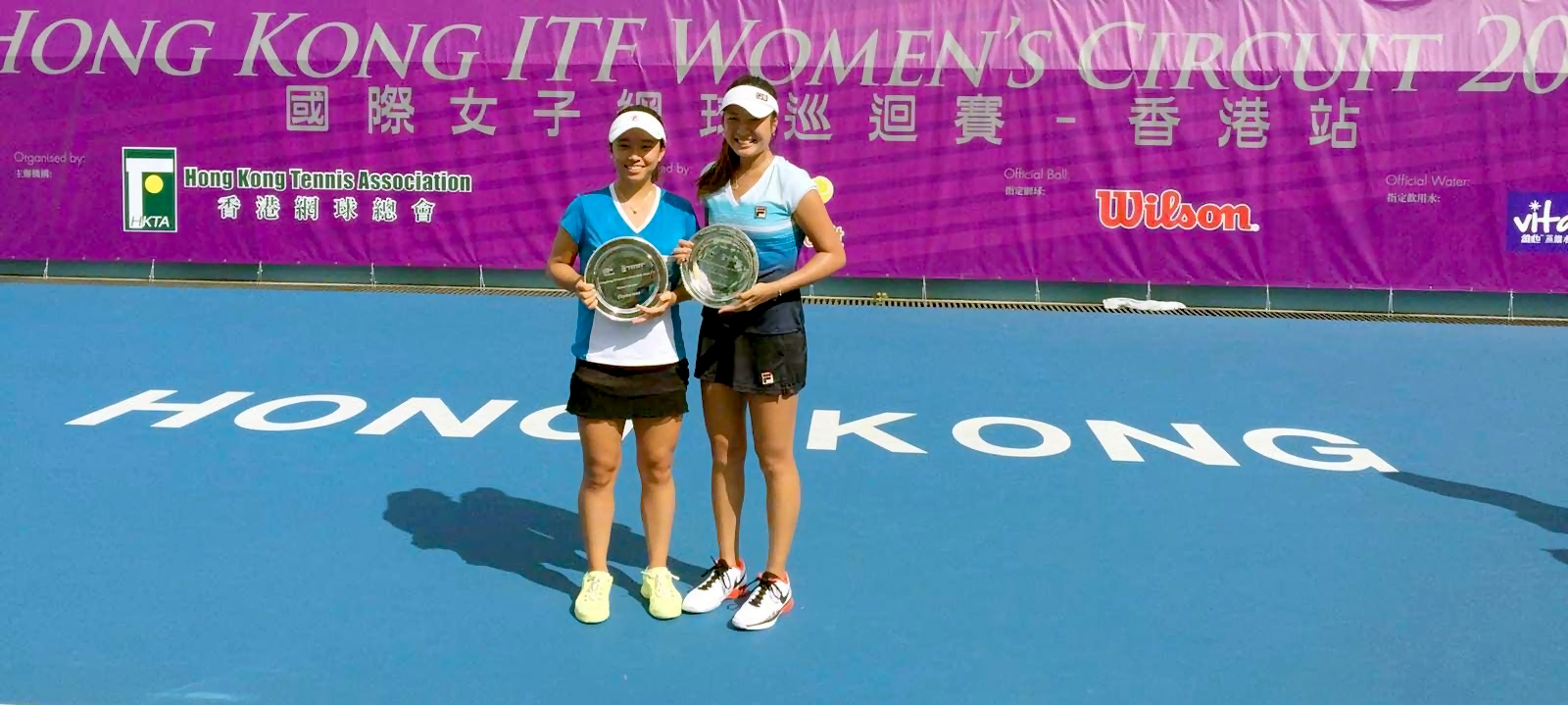
Eudice Chong and Katherine Ip capture ITF Hong Kong doubles title.

Before turning pro in 2018, she won her maiden singles title at the $15k Anning event in 2017 and her career-first doubles title at the ITF Hong Kong in 2016, partnering Katherine Ip. Since then, she has amassed a total of two singles and ten doubles titles on the pro circuit. In 2019 alone, she captured six $25k doubles titles, the most by any Hong Kong player on the pro circuit. All through her travels on the tour, she has picked up titles in China, Hong Kong, Uzbekistan, Japan, and Thailand.

Since coming back after COVID-19 pandemic in October 2021, Chong has won a total of 13 doubles and two singles titles with a 68–9 win–loss record in doubles within 2021–2022. From November 2021 to February 2022, she established a 25 game-winning streak in women's doubles with six titles, and obtained four consecutive $25k titles in Monastir, Tunisia within a month. In April 2022, Chong won her first $25k singles title in Nottingham.

Chong had a 59–7 record with Cody Wong in doubles, winning a total of 13 titles. From January to April 2022, they kept a 28 game-winning streak with seven titles, including a W60 title in Pretoria.

In July 2023, Chong won her first W100 doubles title at the Figueira da Foz Ladies Open together with Arianne Hartono.

In September 2024, Chong advanced to her first ever WTA Tour final at Hua Hin Championships with Moyuka Uchijima, but lost to Anna Danilina and Irina Khromacheva in final.

In September 2025, Chong won her first WTA 125 title at the Changsha Open with Liang En-shuo, followed by another 125 title at the Jingshan Open with Liang again. In Oct 2025, she got into her second WTA 250 final with Liang in Guangzhou Open.

In January 2026, Chong won her third WTA 125 title at the 2026 Philippine Women's Open with Liang again, and reached her third WTA 250 final with Liang in March at ATX Open.

In May 2026, Chong made history to win her third WTA 250 title at the Morocco Open with Magali Kempen, which made her the first Hong Kong tennis player to capture a doubles title on the WTA Tour.

At the 2026 French Open, Chong partnered with Veronika Erjavec, and they entered the main draw as alternates replacing Venus Williams and Hailey Baptiste. In the first round, Chong and Erjavec defeated Miyu Kato and Giuliana Olmos, earning Chong her maiden career Grand Slam tournament victory.

== WTA Tour finals ==
=== Doubles: 4 (1 title, 3 runner-ups) ===
Legend WTA 500 WTA 250 (1–3)	Finals by surface Hard (0–3) Clay (1–0)	Finals by setting Outdoor (1–3)

Result	W–L	Date	Tournament	Tier	Surface	Partner	Opponents	Score
Loss	0–1	Sep 2024	Hua Hin Championships, Thailand	WTA 250	Hard	(Japan) Moyuka Uchijima	(Kazakhstan) Anna Danilina; Irina Khromacheva	4–6, 5–7
Loss	0–2	Oct 2025	Guangzhou Open, China	WTA 250	Hard	(Chinese Taipei) Liang En-shuo	(Poland) Katarzyna Piter (Indonesia) Janice Tjen	6–3, 3–6, [5–10]
Loss	0–3	Mar 2026	ATX Open, US	WTA 250	Hard	(Chinese Taipei) Liang En-shuo	(Australia) Storm Hunter (United States) Taylor Townsend	3–6, 4–6
Win	1–3	May 2026	Rabat Grand Prix, Morocco	WTA 250	Clay	(Belgium) Magali Kempen	(Indonesia) Aldila Sutjiadi; Vera Zvonareva	6–3, 2–6, [10–6]

== WTA 125 finals ==
=== Doubles: 3 (3 titles) ===
Result	W–L	Date	Tournament	Surface	Partner	Opponents	Score
Win	1–0	Sep 2025	Changsha Open, China	Hard	(Chinese Taipei) Liang En-shuo	(Chinese Taipei) Li Yu-yun (China) Yao Xinxin	7–5, 6–3
Win	2–0	Sep 2025	Jingshan Open, China	Hard	(Chinese Taipei) Liang En-shuo	(Chinese Taipei) Lee Ya-hsin (Hong Kong) Cody Wong	7–6^{(7–4)}, 6–2
Win	3–0	Jan 2026	Philippine Women's Open, Philippines	Hard	(Chinese Taipei) Liang En-shuo	(United States) Quinn Gleason (United States) Sabrina Santamaria	2-6, 7–6^{(7–2)}, [10–6]

== ITF Circuit finals ==
=== Singles: 14 (6 titles, 8 runner-ups) ===
Legend W40/50 tournaments (1–1) W25/35 tournaments (2–4) W15 tournaments (3–3)	Finals by surface Hard (5–7) Clay (1–1)

Result	W–L	Date	Tournament	Tier	Surface	Opponent	Score
Loss	0–1	Jul 2017	ITF Anning, China	15,000	Clay	(China) Guo Shanshan	4–6, 4–6
Win	1–1	Jul 2017	ITF Anning, China	15,000	Clay	(Hong Kong) Zhang Ling	6–4, 4–6, 6–3
Win	2–1	Jul 2018	ITF Hong Kong, China SAR	15,000	Hard	(Japan) Sakura Hosogi	6–0, 4–6, 6–3
Loss	2–2	May 2019	ITF Namangan, Uzbekistan	W25	Hard	(Russia) Valeria Savinykh	0–6, 6–4, 5–7
Loss	2–3	Nov 2019	ITF Hua Hin, Thailand	W25	Hard	(Netherlands) Lesley Kerkhove	6–7^{(5)}, 7–5, 5–7
Loss	2–4	Oct 2021	ITF Sharm El Sheikh, Egypt	W15	Hard	(China) Bai Zhuoxuan	6–4, 0–6, 4–6
Win	3–4	Dec 2021	ITF Monastir, Tunisia	W15	Hard	(Belgium) Sofia Costoulas	3–6, 6–4, 7–6^{(5)}
Loss	3–5	Mar 2022	ITF Sharm El Sheikh, Egypt	W15	Hard	(Romania) Elena-Teodora Cadar	5–7, 3–6
Win	4–5	Apr 2022	ITF Nottingham, UK	W25	Hard	(Croatia) Jana Fett	6–2, ret.
Loss	4–6	Feb 2023	ITF Santo Domingo, Dominican Republic	W25	Hard	(Canada) Stacey Fung	6–2, 6–7^{(5)}, 1–6
Loss	4–7	Jun 2023	ITF Hong Kong, China	W25	Hard	(Chinese Taipei) Yang Ya-yi	6–1, 2–6, 1–6
Loss	4–8	Jul 2023	ITF Hong Kong, China	W40	Hard	(China) Wang Yafan	2–6, 3–6
Win	5–8	Jun 2024	ITF Montemor-o-Novo, Portugal	W50	Hard	(Czech Republic) Gabriela Knutson	3–6, 6–2, 6–1
Win	6–8	Jul 2024	ITF Hong Kong, China	W35	Hard	(China) Yao Xinxin	6–3, 6–3

=== Doubles: 52 (34 titles, 18 runner-ups) ===
Legend W100 tournaments (1–2) W60/75 tournaments (4–2) W40/50 tournaments (6–3) W25/35 tournaments (18–6) W10/15 tournaments (5–5)	Finals by surface Hard (32–15) Clay (0–3) Carpet (2–0)

Result	W–L	Date	Tournament	Tier	Surface	Partner	Opponents	Score
Loss	0–1	Aug 2014	ITF Astana, Kazakhstan	10,000	Hard	(Russia) Anna Grigoryan	(Kyrgyzstan) Ksenia Palkina (Russia) Ekaterina Yashina	5–7, 3–6
Loss	0–2	Jul 2015	ITF Hong Kong, China	10,000	Hard	(Hong Kong) Katherine Ip	(South Korea) Choi Ji-hee (South Korea) Lee So-ra	2–6, 2–6
Win	1–2	Jul 2016	ITF Hong Kong, China	10,000	Hard	(Hong Kong) Katherine Ip	(Australia) Alexandra Bozovic (Australia) Kaylah McPhee	6–2, 6–2
Loss	1–3	Jun 2017	ITF Taipei, Taiwan	15,000	Hard	(Hong Kong) Katherine Ip	(Chinese Taipei) Cho I-hsuan (Chinese Taipei) Cho Yi-tsen	2–6, 3–6
Win	2–3	Nov 2018	Liuzhou Open, China	60,000	Hard	(China) Ye Qiuyu	(South Korea) Lee So-ra (China) Kang Jiaqi	7–5, 6–3
Loss	2–4	Jan 2019	ITF Singapore	W25	Hard	(Hong Kong) Zhang Ling	(New Zealand) Paige Hourigan (Indonesia) Aldila Sutjiadi	2–6, 3–6
Loss	2–5	Feb 2019	ITF Nanchang, China	W15	Clay (i)	(South Korea) Kim Da-bin	(China) Cao Siqi (China) Zheng Wushuang	5–7, 6–7^{(4)}
Win	3–5	Apr 2019	ITF Andijan, Uzbekistan	W25	Hard	(Serbia) Tamara Čurović	(Russia) Amina Anshba (Czech Republic) Anastasia Dețiuc	6–2, 6–3
Win	4–5	May 2019	ITF Namangan, Uzbekistan	W25	Hard	(India) Rutuja Bhosale	(Russia) Anastasia Pribylova (Belarus) Shalimar Talbi	6–4, 6–3
Win	5–5	Jul 2019	ITF Nonthaburi, Thailand	W25	Hard	(Indonesia) Aldila Sutjiadi	(Thailand) Peangtarn Plipuech (Japan) Akiko Omae	7–6^{(2)}, 6–4
Win	6–5	Aug 2019	ITF Nonthaburi, Thailand	W25	Hard	(Indonesia) Aldila Sutjiadi	(China) Wu Meixu (Japan) Erika Sema	6–2, 6–1
Loss	6–6	Aug 2019	ITF Huangshan, China	W25	Hard	(China) Ye Qiuyu	(South Korea) Jang Su-jeong (South Korea) Kim Na-ri	5–7, 1–6
Loss	6–7	Aug 2019	ITF Guiyang, China	W25	Hard	(Indonesia) Aldila Sutjiadi	(China) Tang Qianhui (China) Jiang Xinyu	5–7, 5–7
Win	7–7	Oct 2019	ITF Makinohara, Japan	W25	Carpet	(Indonesia) Aldila Sutjiadi	(Japan) Erina Hayashi (Japan) Momoko Kobori	6–7^{(5)}, 7–6^{(2)}, [10–4]
Win	8–7	Oct 2019	ITF Hamamatsu, Japan	W25	Carpet	(Indonesia) Aldila Sutjiadi	(Japan) Sakura Hondo (Japan) Ramu Ueda	6–3, 6–4
Win	9–7	Jan 2020	ITF Hong Kong, China	W25	Hard	(Chinese Taipei) Wu Fang-hsien	(Japan) Moyuka Uchijima (China) Zhang Ying	7–6^{(2)}, 6–1
Win	10–7	Jan 2020	ITF Hong Kong, China	W25	Hard	(Japan) Mana Ayukawa	(Japan) Momoko Kobori (Japan) Mei Yamaguchi	6–4, 6–3
Loss	10–8	Feb 2020	Rancho Santa Fe Open, US	W25	Hard	(China) You Xiaodi	(United States) Kayla Day (United States) Sophia Whittle	2–6, 7–5, [7–10]
Win	11–8	Oct 2021	ITF Sharm El Sheikh, Egypt	W15	Hard	(Hong Kong) Cody Wong	(Czech Republic) Karolína Vlčková (China) Wang Jiaqi	6–2, 6–4
Win	12–8	Oct 2021	ITF Sharm El Sheikh	W15	Hard	(Hong Kong) Cody Wong	(Japan) Eri Shimizu (Hong Kong) Wu Ho-ching	6–2, 6–0
Loss	12–9	Oct 2021	ITF Sharm El Sheikh	W15	Hard	(Hong Kong) Cody Wong	(China) Bai Zhuoxuan (Thailand) Punnin Kovapitukted	6–4, 2–6, [7–10]
Win	13–9	Nov 2021	ITF Sharm El Sheikh	W15	Hard	(Hong Kong) Cody Wong	(China) Bai Zhuoxuan (Thailand) Punnin Kovapitukted	4–6, 6–1, [10–4]
Win	14–9	Nov 2021	ITF Ortisei, Italy	W25	Hard (i)	(Japan) Moyuka Uchijima	(Switzerland) Susan Bandecchi (Switzerland) Ylena In-Albon	6–2, 1–6, [10–5]
Win	15–9	Nov 2021	ITF Selva Gardena, Italy	W25	Hard (i)	(Japan) Moyuka Uchijima	(United Kingdom) Alicia Barnett (United Kingdom) Olivia Nicholls	6–2, 6–1
Win	16–9	Jan 2022	ITF Monastir, Tunisia	W25	Hard	(Hong Kong) Cody Wong	(Russia) Ksenia Laskutova (Sweden) Fanny Östlund	7–6^{(3)}, 7–6^{(8)}
Win	17–9	Jan 2022	ITF Monastir, Tunisia	W25	Hard	(Hong Kong) Cody Wong	(Italy) Nuria Brancaccio (Italy) Lisa Pigato	6–2, 6–3
Win	18–9	Jan 2022	ITF Monastir, Tunisia	W25	Hard	(Hong Kong) Cody Wong	(Russia) Amina Anshba (Russia) Maria Timofeeva	6–0, 6–1
Win	19–9	Jan 2022	ITF Monastir, Tunisia	W25	Hard	(South Korea) Han Na-lae	(Russia) Maria Timofeeva (Belarus) Anna Kubareva	7–5, 6–3
Win	20–9	Mar 2022	ITF Sharm El Sheikh, Egypt	W15	Hard	(Hong Kong) Cody Wong	(Romania) Karola Patricia Bejenaru (Greece) Martha Matoula	6–3, 6–3
Win	21–9	Mar 2022	Pretoria International, South Africa	W60	Hard	(Hong Kong) Cody Wong	(Hungary) Tímea Babos (Russia) Valeria Savinykh	7–5, 5–7, [10–5]
NP	–	Apr 2022	ITF Pretoria, South Africa	W25	Hard	(Hong Kong) Cody Wong	(United States) Anna Rogers (United States) Christina Rosca	cancelled
Win	22–9	Apr 2022	ITF Nottingham, UK	W25	Hard	(Hong Kong) Cody Wong	(Netherlands) Isabelle Haverlag (Romania) Ioana Loredana Roșca	6–2, 6–3
Loss	22–10	May 2022	ITF Nottingham, UK	W25	Hard	(Hong Kong) Cody Wong	(Japan) Mana Ayukawa (Australia) Alana Parnaby	5–7, 4–6
Loss	22–11	May 2022	Grado Tennis Cup, Italy	W60	Clay	(Chinese Taipei) Liang En-shuo	Alena Fomina-Klotz (Slovenia) Dalila Jakupović	1–6, 4–6
Win	23–11	Jul 2022	ITF El Espinar/Segovia, Spain	W25	Hard	(Hong Kong) Cody Wong	(Spain) Marta Huqi Gonzalez (Mexico) Fernanda Navarro	6–2, 4–6, [10–6]
Loss	23–12	Feb 2023	ITF Santo Domingo, Dominican Republic	W25	Hard	(Bosnia and Herzegovina) Nefisa Berberovic	(Latvia) Darja Semenistaja (United States) Sofia Sewing	3–6, 2–6
Win	24–12	Apr 2023	ITF Sharm El Sheikh, Egypt	W25	Hard	(United States) Emina Bektas	Darya Astakhova; Ekaterina Reyngold	6–2, 6–4
Win	25–12	May 2023	ITF Montemor-o-Novo, Portugal	W40	Hard	(Netherlands) Arianne Hartono	(Switzerland) Naima Karamoko (Switzerland) Conny Perrin	6–2, 6–0
Win	26–12	Jul 2023	ITF Hong Kong, China	W40	Hard	(Hong Kong) Cody Wong	(Japan) Natsumi Kawaguchi (Japan) Kanako Morisaki	7–5, 6–4
Win	27–12	Jul 2023	Figueira da Foz Open, Portugal	W100	Hard	(Netherlands) Arianne Hartono	Alina Korneeva; Anastasia Tikhonova	6–3, 6–2
Loss	27–13	Apr 2024	ITF Kashiwa, Japan	W50	Hard	(United Kingdom) Madeleine Brooks	(India) Ankita Raina (Chinese Taipei) Tsao Chia-yi	4–6, 4–6
Loss	27–14	Apr 2024	ITF Shenzhen, China	W50	Hard	(United Kingdom) Madeleine Brooks	(Netherlands) Arianne Hartono (India) Prarthana Thombare	3–6, 2–6
Win	28–14	May 2024	ITF Goyang, South Korea	W50	Hard	(Chinese Taipei) Liang En-shuo	(Thailand) Luksika Kumkhum (Thailand) Peangtarn Plipuech	7–5, 6–4
Win	29–14	May 2024	ITF Montemor-o-Novo, Portugal	W50	Hard	(United Kingdom) Madeleine Brooks	(Switzerland) Leonie Küng; Evialina Laskevich	6–4, 6–4
Loss	29–15	Apr 2024	ITF Shenzhen, China	W50	Hard	(Italy) Lucrezia Musetti	(Australia) Elena Micic (Australia) Alana Parnaby	6–7^{(6)}, 4–6
Win	30–15	Jul 2024	ITF Hong Kong, China	W35	Hard	(Hong Kong) Cody Wong	(Japan) Hiromi Abe (Japan) Saki Imamura	6–4, 3–6, [10–7]
Win	31–15	Nov 2024	ITF Caloundra, Australia	W50	Hard	(Hong Kong) Cody Wong	(United Kingdom) Naiktha Bains (India) Ankita Raina	6–3, 6–2
Loss	31–16	Jan 2025	ITF Nonthaburi, Thailand	W75	Hard	(India) Rutuja Bhosale	(South Korea) Jang Su-jeong (China) Zheng Wushuang	6–4, 0–6, [6–10]
Win	32–16	Jan 2025	Porto Indoor, Portugal	W75	Hard (i)	(Slovenia) Nika Radišić	(Germany) Noma Noha Akugue (Czech Republic) Tereza Valentová	7–6^{(5)}, 6–1
Win	33–16	Jul 2025	ITF Corroios, Portugal	W50	Hard	(Chinese Taipei) Liang En-shuo	(India) Riya Bhatia (Australia) Elena Micic	6–1, 6–0
Loss	33–17	Jul 2025	ITF Gran Canaria, Spain	W100	Clay	(United Kingdom) Madeleine Brooks	(Belgium) Magali Kempen (Czech Republic) Anna Sisková	2–6, 3–6
Win	34–17	Jan 2026	ITF Nonthaburi, Thailand	W75	Hard	(Chinese Taipei) Liang En-shuo	(Chinese Taipei) Cho I-hsuan (Chinese Taipei) Cho Yi-tsen	5–7, 6–1, [10–8]
Loss	34–18	Apr 2026	Tokyo Open, Japan	W100	Hard	(Chinese Taipei) Liang En-shuo	(Hong Kong) Cody Wong (Australia) Alexandra Osborne	6–3, 5–7, [7–10]

== National representation ==
=== Fed Cup ===
Chong made her Fed Cup debut at age 15 against Sri Lanka at the 2012 Asia/Oceania Group II qualifying in Shenzhen. She was also nominated in 2013, 2014, 2017, 2018, 2019, 2022, 2023, 2024, with 9 nominations in total. She competed in a total of 34 ties and has an overall 28–13 win–loss record, going 17–8 in singles and 11–5 in doubles. Her total of 28 victories places her third all-time behind only Zhang Ling (37-26). In 2014, Chong went undefeated in Group II with three wins in singles and one in doubles to help TeamHK secure promotion to Group I for 2015. In 2017, she partnered Katherine Ip to win the deciding doubles against Nigina Abduraimova and Akgul Amanmuradova, 6-7, 6-3, 6-3, to seal a come-from-behind 2–1 victory over Uzbekistan in the final to send Hong Kong up to Group I for the following year's campaign.

=== Asian Games ===
At the 18th Asian Games Jakarta-Palembang 2018, Eudice Chong produced the first noteworthy upset when she sent third-seeded Incheon 2014 silver medalist, Luksika Kumkhum, tumbling out in the second round of the women's singles, 4-6, 7-6, 7-6. The HK rep then outplayed Chinese Taipei's No. 14 seed Chang Kai-chen in straight sets 6-0, 6-2, to set up a quarterfinal meeting with India's No. 1, Ankita Raina. Since a playoff for outright third place was not required, a spot in the semis would guarantee the minimum of a bronze medal. Since tennis was first contested at the third Asian Games in Tokyo 1958, Tsui Yuen Yuen is the only player from Hong Kong to medal in tennis when she claimed a silver in women's doubles in Jakarta 1962 with Ceylon's Ranjani Jayasuriya. However, after jumping out to a 4–1 lead against the world No. 189, she was unable to maintain that advantage, as her opponent fought back from the verge of losing the first set with some high-powered tennis to go through, 6-4, 6-1. In 2014, Chong was also a member of the Hong Kong women's contingent that reached the quarterfinals of the team event in Incheon, South Korea.

=== World University Games ===
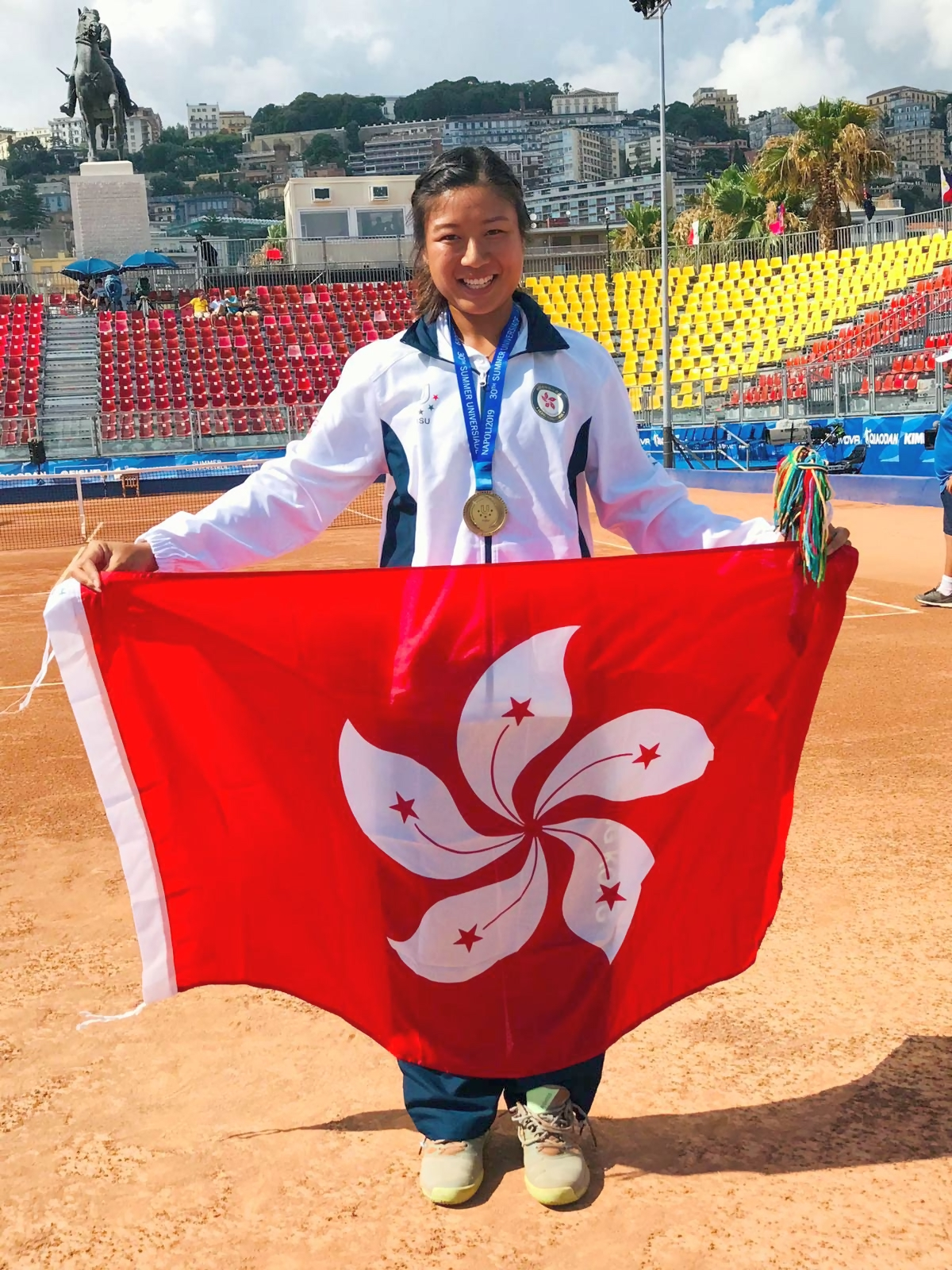
Eudice Chong captures bronze medal in women's singles at the World University Games 2019 in Naples, Italy.

At the XXX Summer Universiade in Naples, Italy, Chong captured Hong Kong's first-ever medal in singles and then added another bronze in women's doubles together with Maggie Ng. In doing so, she set another precedent as the first player from Hong Kong to medal twice in tennis at the same Universiade. Chong also competed at Gwangju 2015 and Taipei 2017, where she was one win away from the medal rounds in women's doubles partnering Katherine Ip.

=== All China Games ===
In the 2021 Shaanxi edition, Chong reached quarterfinals in women's singles, but lost in first round of women's doubles with Cody Wong.

At the All China Games in 2017, Chong played in the women's team event that saw Hong Kong finish ninth overall among 27 provincial sides. In women's singles, she served for the first set against No. 1 seed Zhang Shuai in the second round with a 6–5 lead and was up a break leading 2–0 in the second before she eventually fell to the world No. 29, 7-6, 6-4.

In Dalian in 2013, Chong qualified for the maindraw in women's doubles together with Katherine Ip.

=== Asian Championships ===
Chong competed in women's doubles partnering Tiffany Wu and reached the quarterfinals in singles at the Toyota Asian Championships 2013 held in Bangkok, Thailand.

=== Asian Youth Games ===
Held in Nanjing in 2013, Chong reached the round of 16 in both women's singles and mixed-doubles partnering Andrew Li.

== Personal life ==
Chong was born in Long Island, New York. At age 3, she relocated to Hong Kong where her formative years of schooling and development in tennis took shape. Her earliest experience with the sport came in the form of once-a-week private lessons at a local tennis club, but genuine enthusiasm did not surface until the coach enrolled her for organized tennis with the Hong Kong Tennis Association (now HKCTA).

An Elite Training Grant (ETG) recipient, her training is primarily based at the Hong Kong Sports Institute (HKSI) in Shatin. She is currently coached by former Indian Davis Cupper and 2010 Asian Games bronze medallist, Karan Rastogi, while her physical coach is Romain Deffet, former personal trainer to Li Na, Daniela Hantuchova, and Peng Shuai. In March 2019, Chong, together with fellow Fed Cup teammate, Cody Wong, were the first players selected to the EFG HKTA Tour Team, a three-year financial commitment by the EFG Young Athletes Foundation (YAF) to support local talent.

In 2020, Chong was one of two local sportswomen featured in the October issue of Prestige Hong Kong magazine.

== Endorsements and sponsorships ==
Chong was named as the first Tennis Ambassador by Clearwater Bay Golf & Country Club in 2019, providing financial assistance to her.

Currently, Chong is sponsored by K-Swiss (shoe and apparel) and Wilson (racquet).

== Awards ==
- Cathay Pacific 2019 Hong Kong Sports Stars Award nominee
- ITA Collegiate All-Star Team 2015-18
- Division III Woman Athlete of the Year Award 2018
- Division III ITA National Senior Player of the Year 2018
- Division III ITA All-America, women's singles 2015-18
- Division III ITA All-America, women's doubles 2015-18
- Division III ITA National Rookie Player of the Year 2015
- NESCAC Player of the Year 2015, 2017-2018
- NESCAC Rookie of the Year 2015
- DIII Honda Athlete of the Year Nominee 2015-18
- ITA James O'Hara Sargent Sportsmanship Award 2015
- Jones Award 2017 and 2018 - Most Outstanding Sportswoman of the Year at Wesleyan University
- International Christian School Nehemiah Award 2014
