= Quinn Gleason =

American tennis player (born 1994)

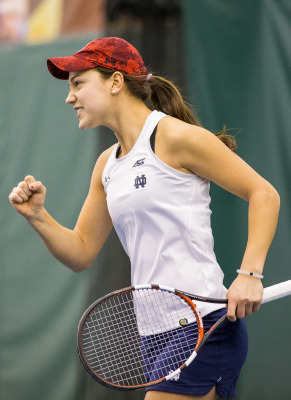
- Gleason in 2016, scoring a point for the University of Notre Dame tennis team
- Country (sports): United States
- Residence: Mendon, New York
- Born: November 10, 1994 (age 31) Mendon, New York
- Height: 5 ft 10 in (178 cm)
- Turned pro: 2016
- Plays: Right (two-handed backhand)
- College: University of Notre Dame
- Coach: Ettore Zito
- Prize money: $635,031

Singles
- Career record: 147–124
- Career titles: 1 ITF
- Highest ranking: No. 323 (July 29, 2019)

Doubles
- Career record: 289–211
- Career titles: 2 WTA, 4 WTA 125
- Highest ranking: No. 33 (October 12, 2026)
- Current ranking: No. 33 (October 12, 2026)

Grand Slam doubles results
- Australian Open: 1R (2025, 2026)
- French Open: 3R (2026)
- Wimbledon: 2R (2025, 2026)
- US Open: 2R (2025)

Grand Slam mixed doubles results
- Wimbledon: 1R (2026)
- Last updated on: October 16, 2026.

Quinn Gleason (born November 10, 1994) is an American professional tennis player who specializes in doubles. She has a career-high WTA doubles ranking of No. 33, achieved on 12 October 2026. Gleason has won two doubles titles on the WTA Tour and four on WTA 125 tournaments, along with fifteen on the ITF Circuit as well as one singles title.

Gleason played collegiate tennis at the University of Notre Dame.

== Personal life ==
Born in Mendon, New York to parents Cynthia Constantino and Sean Gleason, Quinn has an older brother, Sean, and a younger sister, Aerin.

== Career ==
=== 2017: ITF Circuit doubles title ===
Gleason won her first ITF Circuit title 2017 at Indian Harbour Beach, in the doubles draw, partnering with Kristie Ahn.

=== 2021–2022: Major debut ===
Gleason played her first major tournament at the 2021 Wimbledon Championships in doubles. She also competed for the New York Empire in WorldTeam Tennis in the same season.

Partnering Elixane Lechemia, Gleason was runner-up in the doubles at the WTA 125 Montevideo Open, losing to Ingrid Martins and Luisa Stefani in the final.

=== 2023: WTA 125 doubles title, top 100 ===
She reached her first WTA Tour doubles final at the 2023 Prague Open with Elixane Lechemia, losing to Nao Hibino and Oksana Kalashnikova.

Partnering Amina Anshba, Gleason won the doubles title at the WTA 125 Ljubljana Open, defeating Freya Christie and Yuliana Lizarazo in the final. As a result, she reached the top 100 on 25 September 2023.

=== 2024: First WTA Tour title in doubles ===
Partnering with Ingrid Martins, Gleason was runner-up at the WTA 125 Barranquilla Open in August, losing to Jessica Failla and Hiroko Kuwata in the final.

The following month, the pair won the doubles title at the WTA 125 Montreux Open, defeating María Lourdes Carlé and Simona Waltert in the final.

In November, Gleason and Martins claimed the Mérida Open doubles title, defeatinng Magali Kempen and Lara Salden in the final. It was the first title on the WTA Tour-level for Gleason.

=== 2025–2026: Second career title, top 50 ===
Gleason and Martins continued their success in 2025, winning two WTA 125 doubles titles in June at Grado and Contrexéville.

Teaming with Elena Pridankina, Gleason won her second WTA Tour doubles title at the Jiangxi Open in November, defeating Ekaterina Ovcharenko and Emily Webley-Smith in the final.

Gleason reached the top 50 in the doubles rankings, on 30 March 2026.

== WTA Tour finals ==
=== Doubles: 4 (2 titles, 2 runner-ups) ===
Legend WTA 500 (0–1) WTA 250 (2–1)	Finals by surface Hard (2–1) Clay (0–1)	Finals by setting Outdoor (2–2)

Result	W–L	Date	Tournament	Tier	Surface	Partner	Opponents	Score
Loss	0–1	Jul 2023	Prague Open, Czech Republic	WTA 250	Hard	(France) Elixane Lechemia	(Japan) Nao Hibino (Georgia (country)) Oksana Kalashnikova	7–6^{(9–7)}, 5–7, [3–10]
Win	1–1	Nov 2024	Mérida Open, Mexico	WTA 250	Hard	(Brazil) Ingrid Martins	(Belgium) Magali Kempen (Belgium) Lara Salden	6–4, 6–4
Win	2–1	Nov 2025	Jiangxi Open, China	WTA 250	Hard	Elena Pridankina	Ekaterina Ovcharenko (United Kingdom) Emily Webley-Smith	6–4, 2–6, [10–6]
Loss	2–2	May 2026	Internationaux de Strasbourg, France	WTA 500	Clay	(Norway) Ulrikke Eikeri	(Canada) Gabriela Dabrowski (Brazil) Luisa Stefani	5–7, 6–4

== WTA 125 finals ==
=== Doubles: 8 (4 titles, 4 runner-ups) ===
Result	W–L	Date	Tournament	Surface	Partner	Opponents	Score
Loss	0–1	Nov 2022	Montevideo Open, Uruguay	Clay	(France) Elixane Lechemia	(Brazil) Ingrid Martins (Brazil) Luisa Stefani	5–7, 7–6^{(8–6)}, [6–10]
Win	1–1	Sep 2023	Ljubljana Open, Slovenia	Clay	Amina Anshba	(United Kingdom) Freya Christie (Colombia) Yuliana Lizarazo	6–3, 6–4
Loss	1–2	Aug 2024	Barranquilla Open, Colombia	Hard	(Brazil) Ingrid Martins	(United States) Jessica Failla (Japan) Hiroko Kuwata	6–4, 6–7^{(2–7)}, [7–10]
Win	2–2	Sep 2024	Montreux Ladies Open, Switzerland	Clay	(Brazil) Ingrid Martins	(Argentina) María Lourdes Carlé (Switzerland) Simona Waltert	6–3, 4–6, [10–7]
Loss	2–3	Jun 2025	Bari Open, Italy	Clay	(Brazil) Ingrid Martins	(Russia) Maria Kozyreva (Belarus) Iryna Shymanovich	6–3, 4–6, [7–10]
Win	3–3	Jun 2025	Grado Tennis Cup, Italy	Clay	(Brazil) Ingrid Martins	(Slovenia) Veronika Erjavec (Czech Republic) Dominika Šalková	6–2, 5–7, [10–5]
Win	4–3	Jul 2025	Contrexéville Open, France	Clay	(Brazil) Ingrid Martins	(United Kingdom) Emily Appleton (Netherlands) Isabelle Haverlag	6–1, 7–6^{(7–4)}
Loss	4–4	Jan 2026	Philippine Women's Open, Philippines	Hard	(United States) Sabrina Santamaria	(Hong Kong) Eudice Chong (Chinese Taipei) Liang En-shuo	6–2, 6–7^{(2–7)}, [6–10]

== ITF Circuit finals ==
=== Singles: 2 (1 title, 1 runner-up) ===
Legend $25,000 tournaments $15,000 tournaments (1–1)	Finals by surface Clay (1–0) Carpet (0–1)

Result	W–L	Date	Tournament	Tier	Surface	Opponent	Score
Win	1–0	Jun 2017	ITF Villa del Dique, Argentina	15,000	Clay	(Argentina) Victoria Bosio	6–7^{(2)}, 6–3, 6–2
Loss	1–1	Mar 2018	ITF Solarino, Italy	15,000	Carpet	(Belgium) Greet Minnen	6–2, 2–6, 4–6

=== Doubles: 34 (15 titles, 19 runner-ups) ===
Legend W100 tournaments (1–2) W80 tournaments (3–1) W60/75 tournaments (3–4) W25 tournaments (4–5) W10/15 tournaments (4–7)	Finals by surface Hard (7–8) Clay (6–8) Grass (0–1) Carpet (2–2)

Result	W–L	Date	Tournament	Tier	Surface	Partner	Opponents	Score
Loss	0–1	Jul 2016	ITF Târgu Jiu, Romania	10,000	Clay	(United States) Melissa Kopinski	(Romania) Andreea Roșca (Romania) Gabriela Tatarus	6–4, 4–6, [8–10]
Loss	0–2	Jul 2016	ITF Târgu Jiu, Romania	10,000	Clay	(United States) Melissa Kopinski	(Moldova) Alexandra Perper (Romania) Anastasia Vdovenco	6–1, 2–6, [8–10]
Loss	0–3	Oct 2016	ITF Charleston, United States	10,000	Clay	(United States) Whitney Kay	(United States) Andie Daniell (Canada) Erin Routliffe	4–6, 2–6
Loss	0–4	Feb 2017	ITF Manacor, Spain	15,000	Clay	(United States) Jaeda Daniel	(United States) Lauren Embree (Chile) Alexa Guarachi	1–6, 5–7
Win	1–4	Apr 2017	ITF Indian Harbour Beach, United States	80,000	Clay	(United States) Kristie Ahn	(Brazil) Laura Pigossi (Mexico) Renata Zarazúa	6–3, 6–2
Loss	1–5	Jun 2017	ITF Villa del Dique, Argentina	15,000	Clay	(United States) Mara Schmidt	(Paraguay) Lara Escauriza (United States) Stephanie Nemtsova	2–6, 3–6
Win	2–5	Jul 2017	ITF Knokke, Belgium	15,000	Clay	(Brazil) Luisa Stefani	(Switzerland) Leonie Küng (Belgium) Axana Mareen	6–4, 7–5
Win	3–5	Jul 2017	ITF Brussels, Belgium	15,000	Clay	(Brazil) Luisa Stefani	(France) Priscilla Heise (Belgium) Deborah Kerfs	6–3, 6–2
Loss	3–6	Jul 2017	ITF Dublin, Ireland	15,000	Carpet	(United Kingdom) Emily Appleton	(Italy) Giorgia Marchetti (Netherlands) Rosalie van der Hoek	5–7, 4–6
Win	4–6	Aug 2017	ITF El Espinar, Spain	25,000	Hard	(Brazil) Luisa Stefani	(Turkey) Ayla Aksu (Netherlands) Bibiane Schoofs	6–3, 6–2
Win	5–6	Feb 2018	ITF Solarino, Italy	15,000	Carpet	(United Kingdom) Emily Appleton	(France) Mathilde Armitano (Italy) Maria Masini	3–6, 7–5, [10–8]
Win	6–6	Mar 2018	ITF Solarino, Italy	15,000	Carpet	(Belarus) Sviatlana Pirazhenka	(Germany) Anna Klasen (Germany) Romy Kölzer	6–4, 6–4
Loss	6–7	Mar 2018	ITF Solarino, Italy	15,000	Carpet	(Australia) Laura Ashley	(Poland) Katarzyna Kawa (Belarus) Shalimar Talbi	3–6, 4–6
Loss	6–8	Jun 2018	ITF Bethany Beach, US	25,000	Clay	(United States) Sanaz Marand	(United States) Robin Anderson (United States) Maegan Manasse	6–2, 6–7^{(6)}, [3–10]
Loss	6–9	Sep 2018	ITF Templeton Pro, US	60,000	Hard	(Brazil) Luisa Stefani	(United States) Asia Muhammad (United States) Maria Sanchez	7–6^{(4)}, 2–6, [8–10]
Loss	6–10	Oct 2018	Stockton Challenger, US	60,000	Hard	(Brazil) Luisa Stefani	(United States) Hayley Carter (United States) Ena Shibahara	5–7, 7–5, [7–10]
Win	7–10	Nov 2018	Copa Colina, Chile	60,000	Clay	(Brazil) Luisa Stefani	(Chile) Barbara Gatica (Brazil) Rebeca Pereira	6–0, 4–6, [10–7]
Win	8–10	Jan 2019	ITF Petit-Bourg, Guadeloupe	25,000	Hard	(Brazil) Luisa Stefani	(Montenegro) Vladica Babic (Netherlands) Rosalie van der Hoek	7–5, 6–4
Win	9–10	Apr 2019	Innisbrook Open, US	W80	Clay	(United States) Ingrid Neel	(Uzbekistan) Akgul Amanmuradova (Australia) Lizette Cabrera	5–7, 7–5, [10–8]
Loss	9–11	Jul 2019	Challenger de Granby, Canada	W80	Hard	(United States) Ingrid Neel	(Japan) Haruka Kaji (Japan) Junri Namigata	6–7^{(5)}, 7–5, [8–10]
Win	10–11	Feb 2020	Kentucky Open, US	W100	Hard (i)	(United States) Catherine Harrison	(United States) Whitney Osuigwe (United States) Hailey Baptiste	7–5, 6–2
Loss	10–12	Jun 2021	ITF Santo Domingo, Dominican Republic	W25	Hard	(United States) Emina Bektas	(Japan) Erina Hayashi (Japan) Kanako Morisaki	7–6^{(3)}, 1–6, [7–10]
Win	11–12	Jun 2021	ITF Santo Domingo, Dominican Republic	W25	Hard	(United States) Emina Bektas	(Dominican Republic) Kelly Williford (Dominican Republic) Ana Carmen Zamburek	7–5, 6–4
Win	12–12	Oct 2021	Las Vegas Open, US	W60	Hard	(Slovakia) Tereza Mihalíková	(United Kingdom) Tara Moore (United States) Emina Bektas	7–6^{(5)}, 7–5
Win	13–12	Oct 2021	Tennis Classic of Macon, US	W80	Hard	(United States) Catherine Harrison	(United States) Alycia Parks (United States) Alana Smith	6–2, 6–2
Loss	13–13	Feb 2022	ITF Birmingham, United Kingdom	W25	Hard (i)	(United States) Catherine Harrison	(Lithuania) Andrė Lukošiūtė (United Kingdom) Eliz Maloney	6–7^{(4)}, 6–3, [8–10]
Win	14–13	Feb 2022	GB Pro-Series Glasgow, UK	W25	Hard (i)	(United States) Catherine Harrison	(Lithuania) Justina Mikulskytė (Russia) Valeria Savinykh	6–4, 6–1
Loss	14–14	Jan 2023	ITF Naples, United States	W25	Clay	(United Kingdom) Emily Appleton	(United States) Reese Brantmeier (United States) Makenna Jones	4–6, 2–6
Loss	14–15	Jan 2023	Vero Beach Open, US	W60	Clay	(France) Elixane Lechemia	(United States) Francesca Di Lorenzo (United States) Makenna Jones	6–4, 3–6, [3–10]
Loss	14–16	Feb 2023	Guanajuato Open, Mexico	W60+H	Hard	(France) Elixane Lechemia	(United States) Emina Bektas (United States) Ingrid Neel	6–7^{(4)}, 6–3, [6–10]
Loss	14–17	Mar 2023	ITF Fredericton, Canada	W25	Hard (i)	(United States) Jamie Loeb	(United States) Jessie Aney (United States) Dalayna Hewitt	6–7^{(2)}, 4–6
Win	15–17	Apr 2024	Charlottesville Open, US	W75	Clay	(United Kingdom) Emily Appleton	(Russia) Maria Kononova (Russia) Maria Kozyreva	7–6^{(5)}, 6–1
Loss	15–18	Jun 2024	Ilkley Trophy, UK	W100	Grass	(China) Tang Qianhui	(France) Kristina Mladenovic (Romania) Elena-Gabriela Ruse	2–6, 2–6
Loss	15–19	Oct 2024	Tennis Classic of Macon, US	W100	Hard	(Brazil) Ingrid Martins	(United States) Sophie Chang (Poland) Katarzyna Kawa	5–7, 4–6
