= Cody Wong =

Hong Kong tennis player (born 2002)

Cody Wong 王康怡
- Full name: Cody Wong Hong-yi
- Country (sports): Hong Kong
- Born: 14 March 2002 (age 24) Hong Kong
- Plays: Right-handed (two-handed backhand)
- Prize money: $136,135

Singles
- Career record: 185–136
- Career titles: 4 ITF
- Highest ranking: No. 319 (26 June 2023)
- Current ranking: No. 656 (27 July 2026)

Grand Slam singles results
- Australian Open Junior: QF (2020)
- French Open Junior: 2R (2019)
- Wimbledon Junior: 3R (2019)
- US Open Junior: 1R (2019)

Doubles
- Career record: 202–99
- Career titles: 26 ITF
- Highest ranking: No. 152 (27 July 2026)
- Current ranking: No. 152 (27 July 2026)

Grand Slam doubles results
- Australian Open Junior: 2R (2018, 2019)
- French Open Junior: QF (2019)
- Wimbledon Junior: 1R (2019)
- US Open Junior: SF (2019)

Team competitions
- Fed Cup: 10–8
Medal record
Women's tennis
Representing Hong Kong
Asian Games
Bronze medal – third place	2026 Aichi–Nagoya	Doubles
World University Games
Bronze medal – third place	2021 Chengdu	Mixed
- Last updated on: 27 July 2026.

Cody Wong Hong-yi (Chinese: 王康怡; born 14 March 2002) is a Hong Kong tennis player. Her brother Jack Wong is also a professional tennis player.

Wong has a career-high singles ranking by the Women's Tennis Association (WTA) of 319, achieved on 26 June 2023, and a career-high WTA doubles ranking of 152, attained on 27 July 2026. She has won four singles and 26 doubles titles on the ITF Women's Circuit.

In 2020, Wong reached the quarterfinals in Australian Open girls' singles, which was the best ever result of Hong Kong players in Australian Open juniors, and the first Hong Kong player to reach singles quarterfinals of a major event since Patricia Hy-Boulais in 1983.

In 2019, she also advanced to semifinals in girls' doubles of the US Open, and quarterfinals of the French Open, again the best ever result of female Hong Kong players in US Open and French Open juniors. Wong won five singles and seven doubles titles at the juniors ITF World Tennis Tour, with a career high ranking of 18.

Wong first played on the WTA Tour in the 2016 Hong Kong Open, when she was awarded a wildcard for the qualifying draw, and again in 2017 and 2018. She began competing on the ITF Women's Circuit in 2017, and won her first singles title in October 2019 in Hua Hin, Thailand.

Since returning after the COVID-19 pandemic in October 2021, Wong has a breakout season with one singles and 13 doubles titles, including her first $25k and $60k doubles title. She holds a 59–7 record when pairing up with Eudice Chong, winning thirteen titles together.

Wong also represents Hong Kong in the Billie Jean King Cup.

In May 2023, Wong won her first $25k singles title in Incheon, South Korea.

Wong made her WTA Tour main-draw debut as a wildcard entrant at the 2023 Hong Kong Open, losing to qualifier Sofya Lansere in the first round.

In Sep 2025, Wong got into her first WTA Challenger finals in the Jingshan Open with Lee Ya-hsin.

In April 2026, she won her first W100 title in the Ando Securities Open with Alexandra Osborne.

== WTA 125 finals ==
=== Doubles: 1 (runner-up) ===
Result	W–L	Date	Tournament	Surface	Partner	Opponents	Score
Loss	0–1	Sep 2025	Jingshan Open, China	Hard	(Chinese Taipei) Lee Ya-hsin	(Hong Kong) Eudice Chong (Chinese Taipei) Liang En-shuo	6–7^{(4–7)}, 2–6

== ITF Circuit finals ==
=== Singles: 8 (4 titles, 4 runner-ups) ===
Legend W25/35 tournaments W15 tournaments	Finals by surface Hard (4–4)

Result	W–L	Date	Tournament	Tier	Surface	Opponent	Score
Win	1–0	Oct 2019	ITF Hua Hin, Thailand	W15	Hard	(China) Han Jiangxue	2–6, 6–4, 6–3
Win	2–0	Feb 2022	ITF Sharm El Sheikh, Egypt	W15	Hard	(Russia) Mirra Andreeva	6–4, 6–1
Loss	2–1	Mar 2022	ITF Sharm El Sheikh, Egypt	W15	Hard	(Russia) Mariia Tkacheva	6–3, 3–6, 3–6
Loss	2–2	Oct 2022	ITF Hua Hin, Thailand	W25	Hard	(China) Bai Zhuoxuan	6–3, 0–6, 3–6
Win	3–2	May 2023	ITF Incheon, South Korea	W25	Hard	(China) Jiang Xinyu	1–6, 6–3, 3–0 ret.
Loss	3–3	Aug 2024	ITF Kunshan, China	W35	Hard	(China) Shi Han	0–6, 5–7
Win	4–3	Oct 2024	ITF Huzhou, China	W35	Hard	(Thailand) Thasaporn Naklo	7–6^{(5)}, 6–3
Loss	4–4	Apr 2026	ITF Singapore, Singapore	W15	Hard	(New Zealand) Valentina Ivanov	4–6, 2–6

=== Doubles: 39 (27 titles, 12 runner-ups) ===
Legend W100 tournaments (1–1) W60/75 tournaments (2–1) W40/50 tournaments (3–1) W25/35 tournaments (14–4) W15 tournaments (7–5)	Finals by surface Hard (27–11) Clay (0–1)

Result	W–L	Date	Tournament	Tier	Surface	Partner	Opponents	Score
Win	1–0	Oct 2021	ITF Sharm El Sheikh, Egypt	W15	Hard	(Hong Kong) Eudice Chong	(Czech Republic) Karolina Vlcková (China) Wang Jiaqi	6–2, 6–4
Win	2–0	Oct 2021	ITF Sharm El Sheikh, Egypt	W15	Hard	(Hong Kong) Eudice Chong	(Japan) Eri Shimizu (Hong Kong) Wu Ho-ching	6–2, 6–0
Loss	2–1	Oct 2021	ITF Sharm El Sheikh, Egypt	W15	Hard	(Hong Kong) Eudice Chong	(China) Bai Zhuoxuan (Thailand) Punnin Kovapitukted	6–4, 2–6, [7–10]
Win	3–1	Nov 2021	ITF Sharm El Sheikh, Egypt	W15	Hard	(Hong Kong) Eudice Chong	(China) Bai Zhuoxuan (Thailand) Punnin Kovapitukted	4–6, 6–1, [10–4]
Win	4–1	Nov 2021	ITF Sharm El Sheikh, Egypt	W15	Hard	(Romania) Elena-Teodora Cadar	(China) Bai Zhuoxuan (Thailand) Punnin Kovapitukted	6–2, 6–3
Loss	4–2	Dec 2021	ITF Monastir, Tunisia	W15	Hard	(Switzerland) Jenny Dürst	(Spain) Celia Cerviño Ruiz (Hong Kong) Maggie Ng	2–6, 4–6
Win	5–2	Jan 2022	ITF Monastir, Tunisia	W25	Hard	(Hong Kong) Eudice Chong	(Russia) Ksenia Laskutova (Sweden) Fanny Östlund	7–6^{(3)}, 7–6^{(8)}
Win	6–2	Jan 2022	ITF Monastir, Tunisia	W25	Hard	(Hong Kong) Eudice Chong	(Italy) Nuria Brancaccio (Italy) Lisa Pigato	6–2, 6–3
Win	7–2	Jan 2022	ITF Monastir, Tunisia	W25	Hard	(Hong Kong) Eudice Chong	(Russia) Amina Anshba (Russia) Maria Timofeeva	6–0, 6–1
Win	8–2	Feb 2022	ITF Sharm El Sheikh, Egypt	W25	Hard	(Greece) Sapfo Sakellaridi	(Belarus) Yuliya Hatouka (Russia) Anastasia Zakharova	7–5, 4–6, [10–6]
Loss	8–3	Feb 2022	ITF Sharm El Sheikh, Egypt	W15	Hard	(Romania) Elena-Teodora Cadar	(Japan) Hiroki Abe (Chinese Taipei) Lee Pei-chi	7–5, 5–7, [2–10]
Win	9–3	Mar 2022	ITF Sharm El Sheikh, Egypt	W15	Hard	(Hong Kong) Eudice Chong	(Romania) Karola Patricia Bejenaru (Greece) Martha Matoula	6–3, 6–3
Win	10–3	Apr 2022	Pretoria International, South Africa	W60	Hard	(Hong Kong) Eudice Chong	(Hungary) Tímea Babos; Valeria Savinykh	7–5, 5–7, [13–11]
NP	–	Apr 2022	Pretoria International, South Africa	W25	Hard	(Hong Kong) Eudice Chong	(United States) Anna Rogers (United States) Christina Rosca	canc.
Win	11–3	Apr 2022	ITF Nottingham, United Kingdom	W25	Hard	(Hong Kong) Eudice Chong	(Netherlands) Isabelle Haverlag (Romania) Ioana Loredana Roșca	6–2, 6–3
Loss	11–4	May 2022	ITF Nottingham, United Kingdom	W25	Hard	(Hong Kong) Eudice Chong	(Japan) Mana Ayukawa (Australia) Alana Parnaby	5–7, 4–6
Win	12–4	Jul 2022	ITF Corroios-Seixal, Portugal	W25	Hard	(Lithuania) Justina Mikulskyte	(Chinese Taipei) Lee Ya-hsuan (Chinese Taipei) Wu Fang-hsien	6–2, 7–5
Win	13–4	Jul 2022	ITF El Espinar/Segovia, Spain	W25	Hard	(Hong Kong) Eudice Chong	(Spain) Marta Huqi Gonzalez (Mexico) Maria Fernanda Navarro	6–2, 4–6, [10–6]
Loss	13–5	Feb 2023	ITF Antalya, Turkey	W25	Clay	(Egypt) Sandra Samir	(Romania) Cristina Dinu (Slovenia) Nika Radišić	5–7, 2–6
Win	14–5	Mar 2023	ITF Jakarta, Indonesia	W25	Hard	(China) Guo Hanyu	(South Korea) Choi Ji-hee (South Korea) Park So-hyun	6–2, 7–6^{(6)}
Win	15–5	May 2023	ITF Daegu, South Korea	W25	Hard	(South Korea) Park So-hyun	(Chinese Taipei) Cho I-hsuan (Chinese Taipei) Cho Yi-tsen	4–6, 7–6^{(2)}, [14–12]
Win	16–5	Jul 2023	ITF Hong Kong, China SAR	W40	Hard	(Hong Kong) Eudice Chong	(Japan) Natsumi Kawaguchi (Japan) Kanako Morisaki	7–5, 6–4
Win	17–5	Feb 2024	ITF Nakhon Si Thammarat, Thailand	W15	Hard	(Chinese Taipei) Lee Ya-hsin	(China) Yao Xinxin (China) Zheng Wushuang	6–3, 7–5
Win	18–5	May 2024	ITF Santo Domingo, Dominican Republic	W35	Hard	(Australia) Alexandra Bozovic	(Mexico) Jéssica Hinojosa Gómez (Ecuador) Mell Reasco	6–7^{(5)}, 7-5, [11–9]
Win	19–5	Jul 2024	ITF Hong Kong, China	W35	Hard	(Hong Kong) Eudice Chong	(Japan) Hiromi Abe (Japan) Saki Imamura	6–4, 3–6, [10–7]
Loss	19–6	Jul 2024	ITF Sapporo, Japan	W15	Hard	(South Korea) Jeong Bo-young	(Japan) Mana Ayukawa (Japan) Mao Mushika	3–6, 4–6
Win	20–6	Aug 2024	ITF Kunshan, China	W35	Hard	(Chinese Taipei) Lee Ya-hsin	(Chinese Taipei) Li Yu-yun (China) Yao Xinxin	7–5, 6–4
Win	21–6	Nov 2024	ITF Caloundra, Australia	W50	Hard	(Hong Kong) Eudice Chong	(United Kingdom) Naiktha Bains (India) Ankita Raina	6–3, 6–2
Loss	21–7	Jan 2025	ITF Sunderland, United Kingdom	W35	Hard (i)	(South Korea) Park So-hyun	(United Kingdom) Amelia Rajecki (United States) Anna Rogers	6–2, 3–6, [8–10]
Win	22–7	Feb 2025	ITF Leszno, Poland	W75	Hard (i)	(Czech Republic) Ivana Šebestová	(Poland) Weronika Falkowska (Poland) Martyna Kubka	6–4, 1–6, [10–4]
Win	23–7	Mar 2025	ITF Shenzhen, China	W50	Hard	(China) Zheng Wushuang	(China) Li Zongyu (China) Xun Fangying	3–6, 7–5, [10–2]
Loss	23–8	May 2025	ITF Changwon, South Korea	W35	Hard	(Chinese Taipei) Lee Ya-hsin	(Japan) Hirome Abe (Japan) Ikumi Yamazaki	4–6, 2–6
Loss	23–9	Sep 2025	ITF Lu'an, China	W15	Hard	(China) Ni Ma Zhuoma	(Japan) Anri Nagata (Japan) Michika Ozeki	3–6, 6–1, [5–10]
Loss	23–10	Jan 2026	ITF Nonthaburi, Thailand	W75	Hard	(Chinese Taipei) Lee Ya-hsin	(Chinese Taipei) Cho I-hsuan (Chinese Taipei) Cho Yi-tsen	4–6, 7–6^{(7–3)}, [6–10]
Win	24–10	Jan 2026	ITF Birmingham, United Kingdom	W35	Hard	(Chinese Taipei) Lee Ya-hsin	(Germany) Noma Noha Akugue (Netherlands) Stephanie Visscher	6–1, 6–3
Loss	24–11	Mar 2026	ITF Maanshan, China	W50	Hard (i)	(Chinese Taipei) Lee Ya-hsin	Sofya Lansere; Alexandra Shubladze	6–7^{(6)}, 2–6
Win	25–11	Apr 2026	Tokyo Open, Japan	W100	Hard	(Australia) Alexandra Osborne	(Hong Kong) Eudice Chong (Chinese Taipei) Liang En-shuo	3–6, 7–5, [10–7]
Loss	25–12	May 2026	Takasaki Open, Japan	W100	Hard	(Chinese Taipei) Lee Ya-hsin	(Japan) Ayano Shimizu (Japan) Eri Shimizu	1–6, 4–6
Win	26–12	Jul 2026	Dallas Summer Series, United States	W35	Hard (i)	(Thailand) Mananchaya Sawangkaew	(United States) Sophie Llewellyn (Ukraine) Anita Sahdiieva	6–3, 6–1
Win	27–12	Oct 2026	ITF Shenzhen, China	W15	Hard	(China) Han Jiangxue	(China) Zhang Jiale (China) Zheng Wushuang	6–3, 4–6, [10–5]
