= Mei Yamaguchi (tennis) =

Japanese tennis player (born 1999)

Mei Yamaguchi 山口 芽生
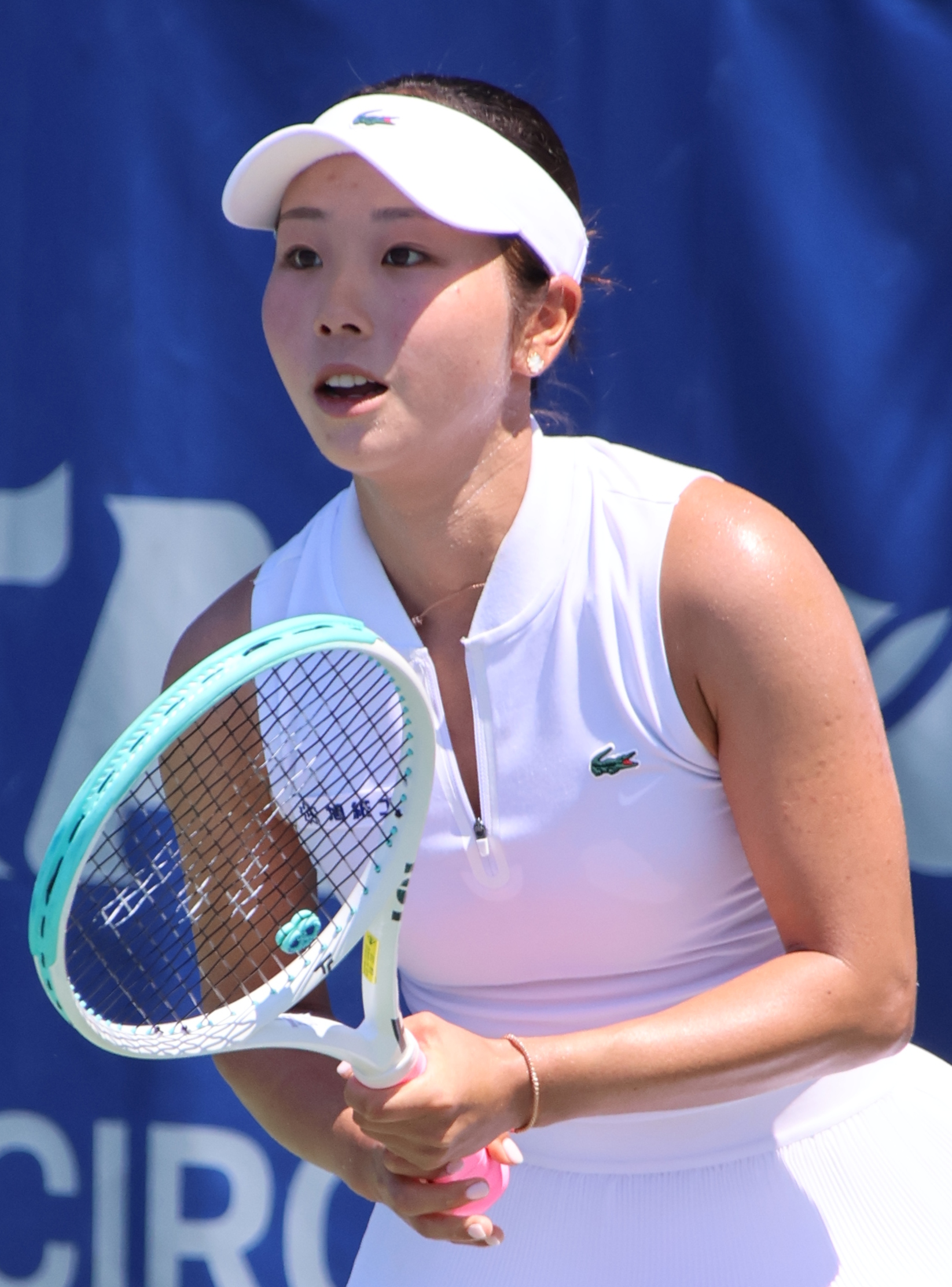
- Yamaguchi in 2026
- Country (sports): Japan
- Born: 14 June 1999 (age 27) Saitama, Japan
- Height: 159 cm (5 ft 3 in)
- Plays: Right (two-handed backhand)
- Prize money: US$108,637

Singles
- Career record: 174–131
- Career titles: 2 ITF
- Highest ranking: No. 242 (5 May 2025)
- Current ranking: No. 242 (5 May 2025)

Doubles
- Career record: 20–26
- Highest ranking: No. 649 (26 July 2021)
- Last updated on: 4 November 2024.

Mei Yamaguchi (山口 芽生, Yamaguchi Mei; born 14 June 1999) is a Japanese tennis player.

Yamaguchi has a career-high singles ranking of 242 by the WTA, achieved on 5 May 2025, and a best WTA doubles ranking of 649, set in July 2021.

Yamaguchi made her WTA Tour main-draw debut at the 2024 Toray Pan Pacific Open, losing to Bianca Andreescu in the first round.

== ITF Circuit finals ==
=== Singles: 3 (2 titles, 1 runner–up) ===
Legend W35 tournaments W15 tournaments	Finals by surface Hard (1–0) Clay (0–1) Carpet (1–0)

Result	W–L	Date	Tournament	Tier	Surface	Opponent	Score
Loss	0–1	Feb 2019	ITF Nanchang, China	W15	Clay (i)	(China) Lu Jiaxi	6–7^{(3)}, 2–6
Win	1–1	Jul 2021	ITF Amarante, Portugal	W15	Hard	(Italy) Federica Rossi	6–4, 3–6, 6–4
Win	2–1	Nov 2024	ITF Hamamatsu, Japan	W35	Carpet	(Japan) Aoi Ito	4–6, 5–3 ret.

=== Doubles: 2 (0 titles, 2 runner-ups) ===
Legend
W25/35 tournaments
W15 tournaments

Result	W–L	Date	Tournament	Tier	Surface	Partner	Opponents	Score
Loss	0–1	Mar 2019	ITF Nanchang, China	W15	Clay (i)	(China) Ma Yexin	(China) Guo Hanyu (China) Zheng Wushuang	0–6, 1–6
Loss	0–2	Jan 2020	ITF Hong Kong	W25	Hard	(Japan) Momoko Kobori	(Japan) Mana Ayukawa (Hong Kong) Eudice Chong	4–6, 3–6
