= Yao Xinxin =

Chinese tennis player (born 2003)

- Country (sports): China
- Born: 20 October 2003 (age 23) Yangzhou, Jiangsu
- Plays: Left (two-handed backhand)
- Prize money: $204,336

Singles
- Career record: 221–148
- Career titles: 3 ITF
- Highest ranking: No. 205 (13 January 2025)
- Current ranking: No. 270 (19 October 2026)

Grand Slam singles results
- French Open: Q1 (2025)

Doubles
- Career record: 79–60
- Career titles: 6 ITF
- Highest ranking: No. 291 (5 January 2026)
- Current ranking: No. 600 (19 October 2026)
Medal record
Representing China
World University Games
Bronze medal – third place	2025 Rhine-Ruhr	Doubles
- Last updated on: 25 October 2026.

Yao Xinxin (Chinese: 姚新欣; born 20 October 2003) is a Chinese tennis player. She has career-high rankings of world No. 205 in singles, achieved on 13 January 2025, and No. 291 in doubles, reached in January 2026.

Yao reached one WTA 125 final and has won three singles titles and six doubles titles on the ITF World Tour.

== Career overview ==
She made her WTA Tour debut as a wildcard entrant at the 2024 China Open but lost in the first round to Cristina Bucșa.

== WTA 125 finals ==
=== Doubles: 1 (runner-up) ===
Result	W–L	Date	Tournament	Surface	Partner	Opponents	Score
Loss	0–1	Sep 2025	Changsha Open, China	Hard	(Chinese Taipei) Li Yu-yun	(Hong Kong) Eudice Chong (Chinese Taipei) Liang En-shuo	5–7, 3–6

== ITF Circuit finals ==
=== Singles: 15 (3 titles, 12 runner-ups) ===
Legend W75 tournaments W50 tournaments W35 tournaments W15 tournaments	Finals by surface Hard (3–12)

Result	W–L	Date	Tournament	Tier	Surface	Opponent	Score
Loss	0–1	May 2022	ITF Monastir, Tunisia	W15	Hard	(Japan) Ayumi Morita	6–7^{(4)}, 5–7
Loss	0–2	Jun 2022	ITF Monastir, Tunisia	W15	Hard	(Malta) Francesca Curmi	2–6, 4–6
Loss	0–3	Jul 2022	ITF Monastir, Tunisia	W15	Hard	(France) Yasmine Mansouri	2–6, 4–6
Loss	0–4	Aug 2022	ITF Monastir, Tunisia	W15	Hard	(China) Wei Sijia	6–4, 6–7^{(3)}, 4–6
Loss	0–5	Oct 2022	ITF Monastir, Tunisia	W15	Hard	(China) Wei Sijia	3–6, 2–6
Loss	0–6	Oct 2022	ITF Monastir, Tunisia	W15	Hard	(France) Manon Léonard	6–7^{(5)}, 3–6
Win	1–6	Jun 2023	ITF Tianjin, China	W15	Hard	(China) Yang Yidi	6–3, 7–5
Loss	1–7	Feb 2024	ITF Nakhon Si Thammarat, Thailand	W15	Hard	(Japan) Saki Imamura	6–7^{(7)}, 5–7
Loss	1–8	May 2024	Jin'an Open, China	W75	Hard	(China) Wang Meiling	5–7, 2–6
Loss	1–9	Jun 2024	ITF Luzhou, China	W35	Hard	(Russia) Anastasia Zolotareva	2–6, 4–6
Loss	1–10	Jul 2024	ITF Hong Kong, China SAR	W35	Hard	(Hong Kong) Eudice Chong	3–6, 3–6
Loss	1–11	Aug 2024	Jinan Open, China	W50	Hard	(China) Zheng Wushuang	2–6, 2–6
Win	2–11	Jan 2025	ITF Nonthaburi, Thailand	W75	Hard	(China) Zheng Wushuang	6–4, 6–0
Win	3–11	Jun 2026	ITF Wuning, China	W50	Hard	(China) Ren Yufei	6–4, 6–4
Loss	3–12	Oct 2026	ITF Qiandaohu, China	W35	Hard	Daria Khomutsianskaya	6–4, 2–6, 4–6

=== Doubles: 14 (6 titles, 8 runner-ups) ===
Legend W50 tournaments W35 tournaments W15 tournaments	Finals by surface Hard (5–8) Clay (1–0)

Result	W–L	Date	Tournament	Tier	Surface	Partner	Opponents	Score
Win	1–0	Nov 2021	ITF Monastir, Tunisia	W15	Clay	(China) Ni Ma Zhuoma	(Thailand) Luksika Kumkhum (Serbia) Nikol Paleček	6–1, 4–6, [10–2]
Loss	1–1	Apr 2022	ITF Monastir, Tunisia	W15	Hard	(China) Wang Meiling	(France) Yasmine Mansouri (France) Nina Radovanovic	5–7, 3–6
Win	2–1	Apr 2022	ITF Monastir, Tunisia	W15	Hard	(China) Wang Meiling	(France) Victoria Muntean (Hungary) Rebeka Stolmár	6–2, 4–6, [10–3]
Win	3–1	May 2022	ITF Monastir, Tunisia	W15	Hard	(China) Wei Sijia	(Japan) Mei Hasegawa (Japan) Chihiro Takayama	6–1, 6–1
Win	4–1	May 2022	ITF Monastir, Tunisia	W15	Hard	(China) Wei Sijia	(Spain) Valeria Koussenkova; Milana Zhabrailova	6–3, 6–3
Win	5–1	Jun 2022	ITF Monastir, Tunisia	W15	Hard	(China) Wei Sijia	(United Kingdom) Abigail Amos (Austria) Arabella Koller	6–0, 6–1
Win	6–1	Jun 2022	ITF Monastir, Tunisia	W15	Hard	(China) Wei Sijia	(Japan) Yuka Hosoki (Japan) Eri Shimizu	6–3, 6–3
Loss	6–2	Jul 2022	ITF Monastir, Tunisia	W15	Hard	(Chinese Taipei) Cho I-hsuan	(New Zealand) Valentina Ivanov (Australia) Lisa Mays	4–6, 7–6^{(2)}, [8–10]
Loss	6–3	Aug 2022	ITF Monastir, Tunisia	W15	Hard	(France) Nina Radovanovic	(Japan) Saki Imamura (Indonesia) Priska Madelyn Nugroho	3–6, 2–6
Loss	6–4	Jul 2023	ITF Tianjin, China	W15	Hard	(China) Liu Yanni	(China) Wang Jiaqi (China) Yang Yidi	5–7, 4–6
Loss	6–5	Feb 2024	ITF Nakhon Si Thammarat, Thailand	W15	Hard	(China) Zheng Wushuang	(China) Guo Meiqi (China) Xiao Zhenghua	3–6, 4–6
Loss	6–6	Mar 2024	ITF Nakhon Si Thammarat	W15	Hard	(China) Zheng Wushuang	(Chinese Taipei) Lee Ya-hsin (Hong Kong) Cody Wong	3–6, 5–7
Loss	6–7	Jun 2024	ITF Taizhou, China	W50	Hard	(China) Wang Meiling	(Chinese Taipei) Cho I-hsuan (Chinese Taipei) Cho Yi-tsen	6–2, 6–7^{(5)}, [7–10]
Loss	6–8	Aug 2024	ITF Kunshan, China	W35	Hard	(Chinese Taipei) Li Yu-yun	(Chinese Taipei) Lee Ya-hsin (Hong Kong) Cody Wong	5–7, 4–6
