= Zheng Wushuang =

Chinese tennis player (born 1998)

Zheng Wushuang 郑妩双
- Country (sports): China
- Born: 29 November 1998 (age 27)
- Plays: Right (two-handed backhand)
- Prize money: $174,681

Singles
- Career record: 232–177
- Career titles: 5 ITF
- Highest ranking: No. 237 (25 August 2025)
- Current ranking: No. 515 (10 August 2026)

Doubles
- Career record: 202–131
- Career titles: 20 ITF
- Highest ranking: No. 129 (5 January 2026)
- Current ranking: No. 178 (10 August 2026)

Team competitions
- Fed Cup: 2–2
Medal record
Tennis
Representing China
World University Games
Silver medal – second place	2021 Chengdu	Team
- Last updated on: 20 August 2026.

Zheng Wushuang (Chinese: 郑妩双; pinyin: Zhèng Wǔshuāng; Mandarin pronunciation: [ʈʂə̂ŋ ù ʂwáŋ]; born 29 November 1998) is a Chinese tennis player.

She has a career-high singles ranking by the WTA of 237, achieved on 25 August 2025. On 5 January 2026, she peaked at No. 129 in the WTA doubles rankings.

On the ITF Junior Circuit, Zheng reached a combined career-high ranking of 13 in January 2016. Playing for China in the Billie Jean King Cup, she has a win-loss record of 2–2 (as of April 2026).

At the 2026 Jiangxi Open in Jiujiang, Zheng gained a wildcard entry into the main draw and defeated Yuliia Starodubtseva to record her first WTA Tour match win at her eighth attempt, before losing to fifth seed Yulia Putintseva in the second round.

== WTA 125 finals ==
=== Doubles: 1 (runner-up) ===
Result	Date	Tournament	Surface	Partner	Opponents	Score
Loss	Oct 2025	Jinan Open, China	Hard	(India) Rutuja Bhosale	Elena Pridankina; Ekaterina Reyngold	1–6, 3–6

== ITF Circuit finals ==
=== Singles: 8 (5 titles, 3 runner-ups) ===
Legend W75 tournaments W50 tournaments W35 tournaments W15 tournaments	Finals by surface Hard (3–3) Clay (2–0)

Result	W–L	Date	Tournament	Tier	Surface	Opponent	Score
Win	1–0	Sep 2019	ITF Anning, China	W15	Clay	(China) Guo Meiqi	7–6^{(7)}, 6–3
Win	2–0	Sep 2019	ITF Anning, China	W15	Clay	(China) Sun Xuliu	7–6^{(3)}, 6–3
Win	3–0	Jun 2023	ITF Tianjin, China	W15	Hard	(China) Shi Han	6–3, 6–2
Win	4–0	Sep 2023	ITF Shenzhen, China	W15	Hard	(China) Li Jiayou	6–3, 6–3
Win	5–0	Aug 2024	Jinan Open, China	W50	Hard	(China) Yao Xinxin	6–2, 6–2
Loss	5–1	Jan 2025	ITF Nonthaburi, Thailand	W75	Hard	(China) Yao Xinxin	4–6, 0–6
Loss	5–2	May 2025	ITF Changwon, South Korea	W35	Hard	(Russia) Ekaterina Reyngold	6–4, 5–7, 6–7^{(2)}
Loss	5–3	Oct 2026	ITF Kunshan, China	W35	Hard	(China) Lin Yujun	2–6, 5–7

=== Doubles: 35 (21 titles, 14 runner-ups) ===
Legend W100 tournaments W60/75 tournaments W40/50 tournaments W25/35 tournaments W10/15 tournaments	Finals by surface Hard (18–12) Clay (3–2)

Result	W–L	Date	Tournament	Tier	Surface	Partner	Opponents	Score
Loss	0–1	Apr 2014	ITF Antalya, Turkey	10,000	Hard	(China) Zhang Ying	(Japan) Kotomi Takahata (United States) Tina Tehrani	1–6, 3–6
Loss	0–2	Jan 2018	ITF Wesley Chapel, United States	25,000	Clay	(Chinese Taipei) Hsu Ching-wen	(Norway) Ulrikke Eikeri (Belarus) Ilona Kremen	2–6, 3–6
Win	1–2	Mar 2018	ITF Nanjing, China	15,000	Hard	(China) Feng Shuo	(China) Sun Xuliu (China) Zhao Qianqian	6–2, 6–4
Win	2–2	Apr 2018	ITF Nanjing, China	15,000	Hard	(China) Chen Jiahui	(China) Sun Xuliu (China) Zhao Qianqian	7–6^{(2)}, 6–1
Win	3–2	Feb 2019	ITF Nanchang, China	15,000	Clay (i)	(China) Cao Siqi	(Hong Kong) Eudice Chong (South Korea) Kim Da-bin	7–5, 7–6^{(4)}
Win	4–2	Mar 2019	ITF Nanchang, China	15,000	Clay (i)	(China) Guo Hanyu	(China) Ma Yexin (Japan) Mei Yamaguchi	6–0, 6–1
Loss	4–3	Jun 2019	ITF Naiman, China	W25	Hard	(China) Chen Jiahui	(China) Guo Meiqi (China) Wu Meixu	5–7, 2–6
Loss	4–4	Jul 2019	ITF Tianjin, China	W25	Hard	(China) Wu Meixu	(China) Jiang Xinyu (China) Tang Qianhui	4–6, 6–7^{(5)}
Win	5–4	Aug 2019	Jinan Open, China	W60	Hard	(China) Yuan Yue	(United Kingdom) Samantha Murray (United Kingdom) Eden Silva	1–6, 6–4, [10–7]
Win	6–4	Sep 2019	ITF Anning, China	W15	Clay	(China) Sheng Yuqi	(China) Sun Xuliu (China) Zhao Qianqian	7–6^{(4)}, 7–5
Loss	6–5	Jun 2023	ITF Luzhou, China	W25	Hard	(China) Feng Shou	(Chinese Taipei) Li Yu-yun (China) Tang Qianhui	6–7^{(4)}, 2–6
Win	7–5	Jun 2023	ITF Tianjin, China	W15	Hard	(China) Feng Shuo	(China) Han Jiangxue (China) Huang Yujia	6–0, 6–2
Win	8–5	Jun 2023	ITF Tianjin, China	W15	Hard	(China) Feng Shuo	(China) Han Jiangxue (China) Huang Yujia	6–2, 6–3
Win	9–5	Aug 2023	ITF Nanchang, China	W40	Hard	(China) Feng Shou	(Chinese Taipei) Cho I-hsuan (Chinese Taipei) Cho Yi-tsen	5–7, 7–6^{(8)}, [10–4]
Win	10–5	Sep 2023	ITF Shenzhen, China	W15	Hard	(China) Xun Fangying	(Chinese Taipei) Lin Fang-an (China) Yuan Chengyiyi	7–5, 6–4
Loss	10–6	Oct 2023	ITF Shenzhen, China	W40	Hard	(China) Feng Shou	(Chinese Taipei) Cho I-hsuan (Chinese Taipei) Cho Yi-tsen	5–7, 3–6
Loss	10–7	Oct 2023	ITF Qiandaohu, China	W25	Hard	(China) Feng Shou	(Russia) Anastasiia Gureva (Georgia (country)) Sofia Shapatava	2–6, 6–4, [4–10]
Loss	10–8	Feb 2024	ITF Nakhon Si Thammarat, Thailand	W35	Hard	(China) Feng Shou	(Thailand) Peangtarn Plipuech (Japan) Naho Sato	1–6, 6–4, [7–10]
Loss	10–9	Feb 2024	ITF Nakhon Si Thammarat	W15	Hard	(China) Yao Xinxin	(China) Guo Meiqi (China) Xiao Zhenghua	3–6, 4–6
Loss	10–10	Mar 2024	ITF Nakhon Si Thammarat	W15	Hard	(China) Yao Xinxin	(Chinese Taipei) Lee Ya-hsin (Hong Kong) Cody Wong	3–6, 5–7
Win	11–10	May 2024	Jin'an Open, China	W75	Hard	(China) Tang Qianhui	(Thailand) Luksika Kumkhum (Thailand) Peangtarn Plipuech	6–1, 6–2
Win	12–10	Jul 2024	ITF Tianjin, China	W35	Hard	(China) Huang Yujia	(Japan) Mana Ayukawa (Japan) Mana Kawamura	6–3, 6–3
Win	13–10	Sep 2024	Incheon Open, South Korea	W100	Hard	(China) Tang Qianhui	(China) Feng Shuo (Japan) Aoi Ito	6–2, 6–3
Win	14–10	Jan 2025	ITF Nonthaburi, Thailand	W75	Hard	(South Korea) Jang Su-jeong	(India) Rutuja Bhosale (Hong Kong) Eudice Chong	4–6, 6–0, [10–6]
Win	15–10	Feb 2025	Brisbane QCT International, Australia	W75	Hard	(Japan) Miho Kuramochi	(France) Tessah Andrianjafitrimo (Norway) Malene Helgø	7–6^{(6)}, 6–3
Win	16–10	Mar 2025	ITF Shenzhen, China	W50	Hard	(Hong Kong) Cody Wong	(China) Li Zongyu (China) Xun Fangying	3–6, 7–5, [10–2]
Loss	16–11	Jun 2025	ITF Taizhou, China	W50	Hard	(China) Huang Yujia	(Indonesia) Priska Madelyn Nugroho (Indonesia) Janice Tjen	3–6, 4–6
Loss	16–12	Jul 2025	Olomouc Cup, Czech Republic	W75	Clay	(India) Rutuja Bhosale	(Slovenia) Dalila Jakupović (Slovenia) Nika Radišić	4–6, 1–6
Win	17–12	Sep 2025	ITF Shenyang, China	W35	Hard (i)	(Thailand) Peangtarn Plipuech	(China) Huang Yujia (China) Xiao Zhenghua	6–3, 6–3
Win	18–12	Oct 2025	ITF Kunshan, China	W35	Hard	(China) Li Zongyu	(India) Rutuja Bhosale (India) Ankita Raina	6–2, 6–2
Win	19–12	Apr 2026	ITF Luzhou, China	W35	Hard	(China) Zhang Ying	(Chinese Taipei) Lee Ya-hsin (China) Li Zongyu	2–6, 6–4, [12–10]
Loss	19–13	Jun 2026	ITF Wuning, China	W50	Hard	(China) Huang Yujia	(Chinese Taipei) Li Yu-yun (China) Zhang Ying	6–4, 0–6, [2–10]
Win	20–13	Jun 2026	ITF Zhengzhou, China	W35	Hard	(China) Huang Yujia	Ekaterina Yashina (Kazakhstan) Sonja Zhiyenbayeva	6–3, 6–2
Loss	20–14	Oct 2026	ITF Shenzhen, China	W15	Hard	(China) Zhang Jiale	(China) Han Jiangxue (Hong Kong) Cody Wong	3–6, 6–4, [5–10]
Win	21–14	Oct 2026	ITF Qiandaohu, China	W35	Hard	(Indonesia) Priska Nugroho	Varvara Panshina; Rada Zolotareva	6–0, 6–7^{(2)}, [10–3]
