= 2023 Torneig Internacional Els Gorchs =

Tennis tournament

- Date: 23–29 October 2023
- Edition: 12th
- Category: ITF Women's World Tennis Tour
- Prize money: $100,000
- Surface: Hard / Outdoor
- Location: Les Franqueses del Vallès, Spain

Champions

Singles
- (Poland) Magdalena Fręch

Doubles
- (Italy) Angelica Moratelli / (Italy) Camilla Rosatello
- Torneig Internacional Els Gorchs

The 2023 Torneig Internacional Els Gorchs is a professional tennis tournament played on outdoor hard courts. It was the twelfth edition of the tournament which was part of the 2023 ITF Women's World Tennis Tour. It took place in Les Franqueses del Vallès, Spain between 23 and 29 October 2023.

== Champions ==
=== Singles ===
- (Poland) Magdalena Fręch def. (Italy) Sara Errani, 7–5, 4–6, 6–4

=== Doubles ===
- (Italy) Angelica Moratelli / (Italy) Camilla Rosatello def. (China) Gao Xinyu / (Latvia) Darja Semeņistaja, 4–6, 7–5, [10–6]

== Singles main draw entrants ==
=== Seeds ===
| Country | Player | Rank^{1} | Seed |
|---|---|---|---|
| NED | Arantxa Rus | 51 | 1 |
| POL | Magdalena Fręch | 69 | 2 |
| CZE | Linda Fruhvirtová | 85 | 3 |
| SLO | Tamara Zidanšek | 96 | 4 |
| BUL | Viktoriya Tomova | 98 | 5 |
| ITA | Sara Errani | 108 | 6 |
| ESP | Marina Bassols Ribera | 110 | 7 |
| FRA | Alizé Cornet | 117 | 8 |

- ^{1} Rankings are as of 16 October 2023.

=== Other entrants ===
The following players received wildcards into the singles main draw:

- (Switzerland) Susan Bandecchi
- (Spain) Andrea Lázaro García
- (Spain) Guiomar Maristany
- (Spain) Marta Soriano Santiago

The following players received entry from the qualifying draw:

- (Spain) Paula Arias Manjón
- (France) Nahia Berecoechea
- (Czech Republic) Victoria Bervid
- Maria Bondarenko
- Alina Charaeva
- (Israel) Lina Glushko
- Ekaterina Reyngold
- (Switzerland) Sebastianna Scilipoti

The following player received entry as a lucky loser:

- (Germany) Sarah-Rebecca Sekulic
