= 2024 Torneig Internacional Els Gorchs =

Tennis tournament

- Date: 21–27 October 2024
- Edition: 13th
- Category: ITF Women's World Tennis Tour
- Prize money: $100,000
- Surface: Hard / Outdoor
- Location: Les Franqueses del Vallès, Spain

Champions

Singles
- Anastasia Zakharova

Doubles
- Alina Charaeva / Ekaterina Reyngold
- Torneig Internacional Els Gorchs

The 2024 Torneig Internacional Els Gorchs is a professional tennis tournament played on outdoor hard courts. It was the thirteenth edition of the tournament which was part of the 2024 ITF Women's World Tennis Tour. It took place in Les Franqueses del Vallès, Spain between 21 and 27 October 2024.

== Champions ==
=== Singles ===
- Anastasia Zakharova def. Alina Charaeva 6–3, 6–1

=== Doubles ===
- Alina Charaeva / Ekaterina Reyngold def. (Germany) Mina Hodzic / (Germany) Caroline Werner 6–2, 7–6^{(7–2)}

== Singles main draw entrants ==
=== Seeds ===
Country	Player	Rank^{1}	Seed
ITA	Sara Errani	90	1
SVK	Anna Karolína Schmiedlová	108	2
UKR	Daria Snigur	119	3
HUN	Dalma Gálfi	134	4
	Anastasia Zakharova	146	5
ESP	Marina Bassols Ribera	153	6
~~GBR~~	~~Heather Watson~~	~~157~~	~~7~~
SRB	Lola Radivojević	180	8
ESP	Guiomar Maristany	183	9

- ^{1} Rankings are as of 14 October 2024.

=== Other entrants ===
The following players received wildcards into the singles main draw:

- (Spain) Ariana Geerlings
- (Spain) Kaitlin Quevedo
- Ekaterina Reyngold
- (Spain) Ruth Roura Llaverias

The following players received entry from the qualifying draw:

- Amina Anshba
- (France) Nahia Berecoechea
- (Spain) Lucía Cortez Llorca
- (United States) Jaeda Daniel
- (Germany) Mina Hodzic
- (Slovakia) Renáta Jamrichová
- (China) Mi Tianmi
- (Germany) Caroline Werner

The following player received entry as a lucky loser:

- Maria Kalyakina
