= 2025 Torneig Internacional Els Gorchs – Doubles =

Doubles
- 2025 Torneig Internacional Els Gorchs

Final
- Champions: (Slovenia) Dalila Jakupović (Slovenia) Nika Radišić
- Runners-up: (Switzerland) Susan Bandecchi (United Kingdom) Freya Christie
- Score: 6–4, 2–6, [10–6]

Events
Singles	Doubles
- Torneig Internacional Els Gorchs

Alina Charaeva and Ekaterina Reyngold were the defending champions, but Charaeva chose not to compete and Reyngold chose to compete in Jinan instead.

Dalila Jakupović and Nika Radišić won the title, defeating Susan Bandecchi and Freya Christie 6–4, 2–6, [10–6] in the final.

== Seeds ==
1. (Spain) Aliona Bolsova / (Spain) Yvonne Cavallé Reimers (quarterfinals)
2. (Slovenia) Dalila Jakupović / (Slovenia) Nika Radišić (champions)
3. (Switzerland) Naïma Karamoko / (Lithuania) Justina Mikulskytė (semifinals)
4. (Czech Republic) Aneta Laboutková / (United Kingdom) Eden Silva (semifinals)

== Draw ==
Key

- Q = Qualifier
- WC = Wild card
- LL = Lucky loser
- Alt = Alternate
- ITF = ITF entry
- PR = Protected ranking
- SR = Special ranking
- SE = Special exempt
- JE = Junior exempt
- JR = Junior Accelerator Programme entrant
- CO = College Accelerator Programme entrant
- NG = Next Gen Accelerator Program entrant
- w/o = Walkover
- r = Retired
- d = Defaulted

=== Draw ===
First round
1	(Spain) A Bolsova (Spain) Y Cavallé Reimers	6	6
WC	(Switzerland) N Gadient (China) Z Zhang	1	3
(Switzerland) S Bandecchi (United Kingdom) F Christie	6	6
(Spain) M Martínez Vaquero (Spain) A Rey García	4	4
3	(Switzerland) N Karamoko (Lithuania) J Mikulskytė	6	6
(Ukraine) M Kolb (Ukraine) N Kolb	2	1
(Germany) G Dittmann (Netherlands) D Tran	6^{1}	6	[9]
(Turkey) B Cengiz (Croatia) M Dražić	7^{7}	1	[11]
(Croatia) I Primorac Pavičić (Slovakia) R Zelníčková	6	6
(Algeria) I Ibbou (Germany) C Werner	2	2
WC	(South Africa) Wa Mdlulwa (South Africa) Wo Mdlulwa	2	3
4	(Czech Republic) A Laboutková (United Kingdom) E Silva	6	6
(Germany) T Morderger (Germany) Y Morderger	1	3
(France) E Cascino (Bulgaria) I Shinikova	6	6
WC	(Spain) C García Alonso (Netherlands) A Rus	4	4
2	(Slovenia) D Jakupović (Slovenia) N Radišić	6	6

Quarterfinals
1	(Spain) A Bolsova (Spain) Y Cavallé Reimers	4	6	[9]
(Switzerland) S Bandecchi (United Kingdom) F Christie	6	2	[11]
3	(Switzerland) N Karamoko (Lithuania) J Mikulskytė	1	7^{7}	[11]
(Turkey) B Cengiz (Croatia) M Dražić	6	6^{3}	[9]
(Croatia) I Primorac Pavičić (Slovakia) R Zelníčková	3	6	[2]
4	(Czech Republic) A Laboutková (United Kingdom) E Silva	6	4	[10]
(France) E Cascino (Bulgaria) I Shinikova	3	1
2	(Slovenia) D Jakupović (Slovenia) N Radišić	6	6

Semifinals
(Switzerland) S Bandecchi (United Kingdom) F Christie	3	7^{7}	[11]
3	(Switzerland) N Karamoko (Lithuania) J Mikulskytė	6	6^{3}	[9]
4	(Czech Republic) A Laboutková (United Kingdom) E Silva	1	2
2	(Slovenia) D Jakupović (Slovenia) N Radišić	6	6

Final
(Switzerland) S Bandecchi (United Kingdom) F Christie	4	6	[6]
2	(Slovenia) D Jakupović (Slovenia) N Radišić	6	2	[10]
