= 2021 Prague Open – Singles =

Singles
- 2021 Prague Open

Final
- Champion: (Czech Republic) Barbora Krejčíková
- Runner-up: (Czech Republic) Tereza Martincová
- Score: 6–2, 6–0

Details
- Draw: 32
- Seeds: 8

Events
Singles	Doubles
- WTA Prague Open

Simona Halep was the defending champion, but chose not to participate.

Barbora Krejčíková won the title, defeating Tereza Martincová in the final, 6–2, 6–0.

== Seeds ==
1. (Czech Republic) Petra Kvitová (first round)
2. (Czech Republic) Barbora Krejčíková (champion)
3. (Czech Republic) Markéta Vondroušová (withdrew)
4. (Czech Republic) Marie Bouzková (first round)
5. (Czech Republic) Kateřina Siniaková (quarterfinals)
6. (Chinese Taipei) Hsieh Su-wei (withdrew)
7. (Serbia) Nina Stojanović (second round)
8. (Czech Republic) Tereza Martincová (final)
9. (Belgium) Greet Minnen (semifinals)

== Draw ==
Key

- Q = Qualifier
- WC = Wild card
- LL = Lucky loser
- Alt = Alternate
- ITF = ITF entry
- PR = Protected ranking
- SR = Special ranking
- SE = Special exempt
- JE = Junior exempt
- JR = Junior Accelerator Programme entrant
- CO = College Accelerator Programme entrant
- NG = Next Gen Accelerator Program entrant
- w/o = Walkover
- r = Retired
- d = Defaulted

=== Finals ===
Semifinals
8	(Czech Republic) Tereza Martincová	6	6
9	(Belgium) Greet Minnen	3	4
(China) Wang Xinyu	1	2
2	(Czech Republic) Barbora Krejčíková	6	6

Final
8	(Czech Republic) Tereza Martincová	2	0
2	(Czech Republic) Barbora Krejčíková	6	6

=== Top half ===
First round
1	(Czech Republic) P Kvitová	6^{5}	6	4
Q	(Slovakia) R Šramková	7^{7}	3	6
(Germany) M Barthel	6	4	3
WC	(Slovakia) V Kužmová	2	6	6
(Australia) L Cabrera	6	2	2
Q	(United States) A Muhammad	3	6	6
PR	(United Kingdom) S Murray Sharan	1	4
8	(Czech Republic) T Martincová	6	6
4	(Czech Republic) M Bouzková	6	4	2
(Australia) S Sanders	3	6	6
Q	(Poland) U Radwańska	6	3	1
(Spain) N Párrizas Díaz	2	6	6
LL	(Russia) A Gasanova	6	4	6
WC	(Czech Republic) L Havlíčková	2	6	4
(Italy) G Gatto-Monticone	0	6	1
9	(Belgium) G Minnen	6	4	6

Second round
Q	(Slovakia) R Šramková	4	5
WC	(Slovakia) V Kužmová	6	7
Q	(United States) A Muhammad	3	4
8	(Czech Republic) T Martincová	6	6
(Australia) S Sanders	4	6	6
(Spain) N Párrizas Díaz	6	3	1
LL	(Russia) A Gasanova	3	6^{3}
9	(Belgium) G Minnen	6	7^{7}

Quarterfinals
WC	(Slovakia) V Kužmová	2	2
8	(Czech Republic) T Martincová	6	6
(Australia) S Sanders	2	1
9	(Belgium) G Minnen	6	6

Semifinals
8	(Czech Republic) T Martincová	6	6
9	(Belgium) G Minnen	3	4

=== Bottom half ===
First round
7	(Serbia) N Stojanović	6^{5}	6	6
PR	(Russia) V Diatchenko	7^{7}	1	3
WC	(Australia) S Stosur	3	6	3
(United States) G Min	6	2	6
(Switzerland) L Küng	2	2
(China) Xin Wang	6	6
LL	(Switzerland) C Perrin	3	4
LL	(Chinese Taipei) E-s Liang	6	6
5	(Czech Republic) K Siniaková	6	6
Q	(United Kingdom) J Burrage	0	4
(Australia) M Inglis	2	2
PR	(Czech Republic) T Smitková	6	6
Q	(United Kingdom) N Bains	3	2
(Belgium) Y Bonaventure	6	6
Q	(Bulgaria) I Shinikova	2	3
2	(Czech Republic) B Krejčíková	6	6

Second round
7	(Serbia) N Stojanović	6	1	4
(United States) G Min	3	6	6
(China) Xin Wang	3	7	6
LL	(Chinese Taipei) E-s Liang	6	5	1
5	(Czech Republic) K Siniaková	2	7^{7}	6
PR	(Czech Republic) T Smitková	6	6^{3}	3
(Belgium) Y Bonaventure	6^{2}	4
2	(Czech Republic) B Krejčíková	7^{7}	6

Quarterfinals
(United States) G Min	3	3
(China) Xin Wang	6	6
5	(Czech Republic) K Siniaková	3	0
2	(Czech Republic) B Krejčíková	6	6

Semifinals
(China) Xin Wang	1	2
2	(Czech Republic) B Krejčíková	6	6

== Qualifying ==
=== Seeds ===
1. (Russia) Anastasia Gasanova (qualifying competition; Lucky loser)
2. (United States) Asia Muhammad (qualified)
3. (Bulgaria) Isabella Shinikova (qualified)
4. (United Kingdom) Samantha Murray Sharan (moved to the main draw)
5. (Slovakia) Rebecca Šramková (qualified)
6. (Poland) Urszula Radwańska (qualified)
7. (Switzerland) Conny Perrin (qualifying competition; Lucky loser)
8. (Chinese Taipei) Liang En-shuo (qualifying competition; Lucky loser)
9. (Russia) Anastasia Zakharova (qualifying competition)
10. (United Kingdom) Jodie Burrage (qualified)
11. (China) Yuan Yue (qualifying competition)
12. (United Kingdom) Naiktha Bains (qualified)

=== Qualifiers ===
1. (United Kingdom) Jodie Burrage
2. (United States) Asia Muhammad
3. (Bulgaria) Isabella Shinikova
4. (United Kingdom) Naiktha Bains
5. (Slovakia) Rebecca Šramková
6. (Poland) Urszula Radwańska

=== Lucky losers ===
1. (Switzerland) Conny Perrin
2. (Russia) Anastasia Gasanova
3. (Chinese Taipei) Liang En-shuo

=== Draw ===
==== First qualifier ====
First round
1	(Russia) Anastasia Gasanova	6	6
(Argentina) María Lourdes Carlé	1	3
WC	(Czech Republic) Patricie Kubíková	5	1
10	(United Kingdom) Jodie Burrage	7	6

Qualifying competition
1	(Russia) Anastasia Gasanova	1	1
10	(United Kingdom) Jodie Burrage	6	6

==== Second qualifier ====
First round
2	(United States) Asia Muhammad	6	6
WC	(Czech Republic) Denisa Hindová	2	0
WC	(Czech Republic) Linda Klimovičová	2	5
9	(Russia) Anastasia Zakharova	6	7

Qualifying competition
2	(United States) Asia Muhammad	6	7
9	(Russia) Anastasia Zakharova	3	5

==== Third qualifier ====
First round
3	(Bulgaria) Isabella Shinikova	6	7
(India) Riya Bhatia	2	5
(Czech Republic) Miriam Kolodziejová	2	3
7	(Switzerland) Conny Perrin	6	6

Qualifying competition
3	(Bulgaria) Isabella Shinikova	6	6
7	(Switzerland) Conny Perrin	2	2

==== Fourth qualifier ====
First round				Qualifying competition
				WC	(Czech Republic) Tereza Valentová	2	2
				12	(United Kingdom) Naiktha Bains	6	6
WC	(Czech Republic) Barbora Miklová	1	0^{r}	12	(United Kingdom) Naiktha Bains	6	6
12	(United Kingdom) Naiktha Bains	6	0

==== Fifth qualifier ====
First round
5	(Slovakia) Rebecca Šramková	6	6
WC	(Czech Republic) Barbora Palicová	1	4
(United Kingdom) Tara Moore	5	6^{9}
11	(China) Yuan Yue	7	7^{11}

Qualifying competition
5	(Slovakia) Rebecca Šramková	6	6
11	(China) Yuan Yue	3	2

==== Sixth qualifier ====
First round
6	(Poland) Urszula Radwańska	6	6
WC	(Czech Republic) Dominika Šalková	1	1
(United States) Emina Bektas	3	3
8/PR	(Chinese Taipei) Liang En-shuo	6	6

Qualifying competition
6	(Poland) Urszula Radwańska	6	6
8/PR	(Chinese Taipei) Liang En-shuo	2	4
