= 2025 Torneig Internacional Els Gorchs =

Tennis tournament

- Date: 13–19 October 2025
- Edition: 14th
- Category: ITF Women's World Tennis Tour
- Prize money: $100,000
- Surface: Hard / Outdoor
- Location: Les Franqueses del Vallès, Spain

Champions

Singles
- (Latvia) Darja Semeņistaja

Doubles
- (Slovenia) Dalila Jakupović / (Slovenia) Nika Radišić
- Torneig Internacional Els Gorchs

The 2025 Torneig Internacional Els Gorchs is a professional tennis tournament played on outdoor hard courts. It was the fourteenth edition of the tournament which was part of the 2025 ITF Women's World Tennis Tour. It took place in Les Franqueses del Vallès, Spain between 13 and 19 October 2025.

== Champions ==
=== Singles ===
- (Latvia) Darja Semeņistaja def. (Poland) Linda Klimovičová, 7–5, 7–6^{(7–4)}

=== Doubles ===
- (Slovenia) Dalila Jakupović / (Slovenia) Nika Radišić def. (Switzerland) Susan Bandecchi / (United Kingdom) Freya Christie, 6–4, 2–6, [10–6]

== Singles main draw entrants ==
=== Seeds ===
Country	Player	Rank^{1}	Seed
LAT	Darja Semeņistaja	101	1
NED	Arantxa Rus	129	2
ITA	Lucrezia Stefanini	150	3
ESP	Kaitlin Quevedo	152	4
FRA	Jessika Ponchet	161	5
POL	Linda Klimovičová	167	6
SRB	Lola Radivojević	173	7
UKR	Daria Snigur	175	8

- ^{1} Rankings are as of 6 October 2025.

=== Other entrants ===
The following players received wildcards into the singles main draw:

- (China) Geng Xinle
- (South Africa) Wozuko Mdlulwa
- (Spain) Ruth Roura Llaverias
- (Spain) Lorena Solar Donoso

The following players received entry from the qualifying draw:

- (France) Nahia Berecoechea
- (Turkey) Berfu Cengiz
- (United Kingdom) Freya Christie
- (Germany) Gina Dittmann
- (Spain) Georgina García Pérez
- (Germany) Mina Hodzic
- (China) Tian Jialin
- (Slovakia) Radka Zelníčková

The following player received entry as a lucky loser:

- (Bulgaria) Isabella Shinikova
