= 2022 Torneig Internacional Els Gorchs =

Tennis tournament

- Date: 24–30 October 2022
- Edition: 11th
- Category: ITF Women's World Tennis Tour
- Prize money: $100,000
- Surface: Hard / Outdoor
- Location: Les Franqueses del Vallès, Spain

Champions

Singles
- (Italy) Jasmine Paolini

Doubles
- (Spain) Aliona Bolsova / (Spain) Rebeka Masarova
- Torneig Internacional Els Gorchs

The 2022 Torneig Internacional Els Gorchs was a professional tennis tournament played on outdoor hard courts. It was the eleventh edition of the tournament which was part of the 2022 ITF Women's World Tennis Tour. It took place in Les Franqueses del Vallès, Spain between 24 and 30 October 2022.

== Champions ==
=== Singles ===
- (Italy) Jasmine Paolini def. (Ukraine) Kateryna Baindl, 6–4, 6–4

=== Doubles ===
- (Spain) Aliona Bolsova / (Spain) Rebeka Masarova def. (Japan) Misaki Doi / (Indonesia) Beatrice Gumulya, 7–5, 1–6, [10–3]

== Singles main draw entrants ==
=== Seeds ===
Country	Player	Rank^{1}	Seed
UKR	Anhelina Kalinina	43	1
ITA	Jasmine Paolini	67	2
GER	Tamara Korpatsch	96	3
SVK	Anna Karolína Schmiedlová	104	4
ROU	Elena-Gabriela Ruse	105	5
ITA	Sara Errani	106	6
SUI	Simona Waltert	113	7
NED	Arantxa Rus	114	8

- ^{1} Rankings are as of 17 October 2022.

=== Other entrants ===
The following players received wildcards into the singles main draw:

- (Spain) Irene Burillo Escorihuela
- (Spain) Yvonne Cavallé Reimers
- (Spain) Andrea Lázaro García
- (Spain) Rosa Vicens Mas

The following player received entry into the singles main draw as a special exempt:

- (Spain) Rebeka Masarova

The following players received entry from the qualifying draw:

- (Belgium) Marie Benoît
- (Malta) Francesca Curmi
- (Spain) Marta González Encinas
- Ksenia Laskutova
- (Slovenia) Nika Radišić
- (Latvia) Darja Semenistaja
- (South Korea) Shin Ji-ho
- (Serbia) Natalija Stevanović
