= 2025 Torneig Internacional Els Gorchs – Singles =

Singles
- 2025 Torneig Internacional Els Gorchs

Final
- Champion: (Latvia) Darja Semeņistaja
- Runner-up: (Poland) Linda Klimovičová
- Score: 7–5, 7–6^{(7–4)}

Events
Singles	Doubles
- Torneig Internacional Els Gorchs

Anastasia Zakharova was the defending champion but chose to compete in Jinan instead.

Darja Semeņistaja won the title, after defeating Linda Klimovičová 7–5, 7–6^{(7–4)} in the final.

== Seeds ==
1. (Latvia) Darja Semeņistaja (champion)
2. (Netherlands) Arantxa Rus (quarterfinals)
3. (Italy) Lucrezia Stefanini (quarterfinals)
4. (Spain) Kaitlin Quevedo (quarterfinals)
5. (France) Jessika Ponchet (first round)
6. (Poland) Linda Klimovičová (final)
7. (Serbia) Lola Radivojević (semifinals)
8. (Ukraine) Daria Snigur (semifinals)

== Draw ==
Key

- Q = Qualifier
- WC = Wild card
- LL = Lucky loser
- Alt = Alternate
- ITF = ITF entry
- PR = Protected ranking
- SR = Special ranking
- SE = Special exempt
- JE = Junior exempt
- JR = Junior Accelerator Programme entrant
- CO = College Accelerator Programme entrant
- NG = Next Gen Accelerator Program entrant
- w/o = Walkover
- r = Retired
- d = Defaulted

=== Finals ===
Semifinals
1	(Latvia) Darja Semeņistaja	6	6
8	(Ukraine) Daria Snigur	2	2
6	(Poland) Linda Klimovičová	3	7^{7}	6
7	(Serbia) Lola Radivojević	6	6^{5}	2

Final
1	(Latvia) Darja Semeņistaja	7	7^{7}
6	(Poland) Linda Klimovičová	5	6^{4}

=== Top half ===
First round
1	(Latvia) D Semeņistaja	6	4	7
(Germany) A-L Friedsam	2	6	5
LL	(Bulgaria) I Shinikova	6	6
(Spain) G Maristany	2	1
(Switzerland) S Bandecchi	6	6
WC	(Spain) R Roura Llaverias	3	4
(Spain) A Bolsova	6	3	7
5	(France) J Ponchet	2	6	5
4	(Spain) K Quevedo	6	6
WC	(Spain) L Solar Donoso	0	3
(Lithuania) J Mikulskytė	2	3
(Czech Republic) G Knutson	6	6
(Spain) M Bassols Ribera	6^{8}	4
Q	(Germany) M Hodzic	7^{10}	6
Q	(France) N Berecoechea	3	2
8	(Ukraine) D Snigur	6	6

Second round
1	(Latvia) D Semeņistaja	4	6	7
LL	(Bulgaria) I Shinikova	6	1	5
(Switzerland) S Bandecchi	6	7^{7}
(Spain) A Bolsova	3	6^{5}
4	(Spain) K Quevedo	6	6
(Czech Republic) G Knutson	3	3
Q	(Germany) M Hodzic	1	4
8	(Ukraine) D Snigur	6	6

Quarterfinals
1	(Latvia) D Semeņistaja	6	7
(Switzerland) S Bandecchi	4	2
4	(Spain) K Quevedo	4	1
8	(Ukraine) D Snigur	6	6

Semifinals
1	(Latvia) D Semeņistaja	6	6
8	(Ukraine) D Snigur	2	2

=== Bottom half ===
First round
6	(Poland) L Klimovičová	6	6
(Serbia) M Ristić	4	1
Q	(Germany) G Dittmann	6	6
Q	(United Kingdom) F Christie	4	2
(Cyprus) R Șerban	6	6
(Germany) C Werner	4	2
(Ukraine) A Sobolieva	4	3
3	(Italy) L Stefanini	6	6
7	(Serbia) L Radivojević	6	6
WC	(South Africa) Wo Mdlulwa	2	3
Q	(China) J Tian	6	3	6
WC	(China) X Geng	1	6	3
Q	(Turkey) B Cengiz	6	6
Q	(Slovakia) R Zelníčková	2	4
Q	(Spain) G García Pérez	6	3	4
2	(Netherlands) A Rus	2	6	6

Second round
6	(Poland) L Klimovičová	6	6
Q	(Germany) G Dittmann	0	1
(Cyprus) R Șerban	4	6	1
3	(Italy) L Stefanini	6	3	6
7	(Serbia) L Radivojević	6	6
Q	(China) J Tian	4	2
Q	(Turkey) B Cengiz	3	2
2	(Netherlands) A Rus	6	6

Quarterfinals
6	(Poland) L Klimovičová	6	2	6
3	(Italy) L Stefanini	4	6	3
7	(Serbia) L Radivojević	6	7^{8}
2	(Netherlands) A Rus	2	6^{6}

Semifinals
6	(Poland) L Klimovičová	3	7^{7}	6
7	(Serbia) L Radivojević	6	6^{5}	2
