= 2022 Vrnjačka Banja Open – Singles =

Singles
- 2022 Vrnjačka Banja Open

Final
- Champion: (Spain) Aliona Bolsova
- Runner-up: (Slovenia) Nina Potočnik
- Score: 7–5, 6–1

Events
Singles	Doubles
← 2022 ·	Vrnjačka Banja Open	· 2023 →

Aliona Bolsova won the title, defeating Nina Potočnik in the final, 7–5, 6–1

Mia Ristić was the defending champion, but lost to Potočnik in the semifinals.

== Seeds ==
1. Elina Avanesyan (second round, retired)
2. (Romania) Alexandra Cadanțu-Ignatik (semifinals)
3. (Australia) Jaimee Fourlis (quarterfinals)
4. (France) Elsa Jacquemot (first round)
5. (Austria) Sinja Kraus (second round)
6. (Croatia) Tena Lukas (quarterfinals)
7. (France) Séléna Janicijevic (first round)
8. (Turkey) İpek Öz (second round)

== Draw ==
=== Key ===
- Q = Qualifier
- WC = Wild card
- LL = Lucky loser
- Alt = Alternate
- ITF = ITF entry
- PR = Protected ranking
- SR = Special ranking
- SE = Special exempt
- JE = Junior exempt
- JR = Junior Accelerator Programme entrant
- CO = College Accelerator Programme entrant
- NG = Next Gen Accelerator Program entrant
- w/o = Walkover
- r = Retired
- d = Defaulted

=== Finals ===
Semifinals
WC	(Serbia) Mia Ristić	6	0	4
(Slovenia) Nina Potočnik	0	6	6
(Spain) Aliona Bolsova	7^{7}	6
2	(Romania) Alexandra Cadanțu-Ignatik	6^{5}	1

Final
(Slovenia) Nina Potočnik	5	1
(Spain) Aliona Bolsova	7	6

=== Top half ===
First round
1	E Avanesyan	6	6
LL	(Serbia) M Mašić	2	1
Q	E Laskevich	1	1
WC	(Serbia) M Ristić	6	6
(Romania) C Dinu	6	6
(Spain) I Burillo Escorihuela	4	3
(Germany) N Schunk	1	6^{3}
8	(Turkey) İ Öz	6	7^{7}
3	(Australia) J Fourlis	6	5	6
Q	(Turkey) Z Sönmez	1	7	3
Q	(Romania) O Gavrilă	6	5
Q	(Slovakia) R Zelníčková	3	3^{r}
PR	(Colombia) E Arango	6^{5}	5
(Slovenia) N Potočnik	7^{7}	7
Q	(Bulgaria) G Topalova	4	6	2
5	(Austria) S Kraus	6	3	6

Second round
1	E Avanesyan	1	1^{r}
WC	(Serbia) M Ristić	6	2
(Romania) C Dinu	6	6
8	(Turkey) İ Öz	2	4
3	(Australia) J Fourlis	6	6
Q	(Romania) O Gavrilă	3	1
(Slovenia) N Potočnik	6	4	7^{8}
5	(Austria) S Kraus	3	6	6^{6}

Quarterfinals
WC	(Serbia) M Ristić	6	6
(Romania) C Dinu	4	3
3	(Australia) J Fourlis	2	6	1
(Slovenia) N Potočnik	6	3	6

Semifinals
WC	(Serbia) M Ristić	6	0	4
(Slovenia) N Potočnik	0	6	6

=== Bottom half ===
First round
6	(Croatia) T Lukas	6	6
WC	(Croatia) L Ćirić Bagarić	2	2
Q	(United States) J Aney	6	3	6
SE	(Japan) M Matsuda	1	6	4
(North Macedonia) L Gjorcheska	4	4
WC	(Serbia) I Jorović	6	6
(Spain) A Bolsova	6	6
4	(France) E Jacquemot	1	3
7	(France) S Janicijevic	4	2
D Astakhova	6	6
E Reyngold	4	6	2
WC	(Serbia) L Radivojević	6	3	6
(Denmark) S Samavati	6	7^{7}
Q	D Lodikova	4	6^{3}
Q	(Switzerland) B Klincov	2	7^{9}	5
2	(Romania) A Cadanțu-Ignatik	6	6^{7}	7

Second round
6	(Croatia) T Lukas	6	7^{7}
Q	(United States) J Aney	4	6^{1}
WC	(Serbia) I Jorović	1	0
(Spain) A Bolsova	6	6
D Astakhova	6^{5}	5
WC	(Serbia) L Radivojević	7^{7}	7
(Denmark) S Samavati	0	6	1
2	(Romania) A Cadanțu-Ignatik	6	4	6

Quarterfinals
6	(Croatia) T Lukas	6	4	3
(Spain) A Bolsova	2	6	6
WC	(Serbia) L Radivojević	4	6	1
2	(Romania) A Cadanțu-Ignatik	6	2	6

Semifinals
(Spain) A Bolsova	7^{7}	6
2	(Romania) A Cadanțu-Ignatik	6^{5}	1
