= 2021 Prague Open – Doubles =

Doubles
- 2021 Prague Open

Final
- Champions: (Czech Republic) Marie Bouzková (Czech Republic) Lucie Hradecká
- Runners-up: (Slovakia) Viktória Kužmová (Serbia) Nina Stojanović
- Score: 7–6^{(7–3)}, 6–4

Details
- Draw: 16
- Seeds: 4

Events
Singles	Doubles
- WTA Prague Open

Lucie Hradecká and Kristýna Plíšková were the defending champions, however Plíšková chose not to participate.

Hradecká played alongside Marie Bouzková and successfully defended her title, defeating Viktória Kužmová and Nina Stojanović in the final, 7–6^{(7–3)}, 6–4.

== Seeds ==
1. (Slovakia) Viktória Kužmová / (Serbia) Nina Stojanović (final)
2. (United States) Asia Muhammad / (Australia) Storm Sanders (semifinals)
3. (Czech Republic) Marie Bouzková / (Czech Republic) Lucie Hradecká (champions)
4. (Switzerland) Conny Perrin / (Netherlands) Rosalie van der Hoek (quarterfinals, retired)

== Draw ==
Key

- Q = Qualifier
- WC = Wild card
- LL = Lucky loser
- Alt = Alternate
- ITF = ITF entry
- PR = Protected ranking
- SR = Special ranking
- SE = Special exempt
- JE = Junior exempt
- JR = Junior Accelerator Programme entrant
- CO = College Accelerator Programme entrant
- NG = Next Gen Accelerator Program entrant
- w/o = Walkover
- r = Retired
- d = Defaulted

=== Draw ===
First round
1	(Slovakia) V Kužmová (Serbia) N Stojanović	6	6
(Australia) L Cabrera (Australia) M Inglis	4	2
WC	(Czech Republic) L Klimovičová (Czech Republic) B Palicová	6	4	[6]
(Russia) V Diatchenko (Czech Republic) T Martincová	3	6	[10]
4	(Switzerland) C Perrin (Netherlands) R van der Hoek	6	2	[10]
(Russia) A Gasanova (Bulgaria) I Shinikova	4	6	[8]
(Italy) G Gatto-Monticone (Spain) N Párrizas Díaz	3	2
(United States) E Bektas (United Kingdom) T Moore	6	6
(Belgium) Y Bonaventure (Switzerland) L Küng	6	6
(Germany) T Morderger (Germany) Y Morderger	2	3
(Chinese Taipei) E-s Liang (United States) G Min	2	2
3	(Czech Republic) M Bouzková (Czech Republic) L Hradecká	6	6
WC	(Czech Republic) L Havlíčková (Czech Republic) M Kolodziejová	4	3
(United Kingdom) N Bains (United Kingdom) S Murray Sharan	6	6
(United Kingdom) J Burrage (Australia) S Stosur	4	4
2	(United States) A Muhammad (Australia) S Sanders	6	6

Quarterfinals
1	(Slovakia) V Kužmová (Serbia) N Stojanović	4	6	[11]
(Russia) V Diatchenko (Czech Republic) T Martincová	6	3	[9]
4	(Switzerland) C Perrin (Netherlands) R van der Hoek	6^{5}	1^{r}
(United States) E Bektas (United Kingdom) T Moore	7^{7}	3
(Belgium) Y Bonaventure (Switzerland) L Küng	1	1
3	(Czech Republic) M Bouzková (Czech Republic) L Hradecká	6	6
(United Kingdom) N Bains (United Kingdom) S Murray Sharan	1	0
2	(United States) A Muhammad (Australia) S Sanders	6	6

Semifinals
1	(Slovakia) V Kužmová (Serbia) N Stojanović	6	6
(United States) E Bektas (United Kingdom) T Moore	4	4
3	(Czech Republic) M Bouzková (Czech Republic) L Hradecká	6	6
2	(United States) A Muhammad (Australia) S Sanders	3	4

Final
1	(Slovakia) V Kužmová (Serbia) N Stojanović	6^{3}	4
3	(Czech Republic) M Bouzková (Czech Republic) L Hradecká	7^{7}	6
