= 2022 Vrnjačka Banja Open – Doubles =

Doubles
- 2022 Vrnjačka Banja Open

Final
- Champions: Darya Astakhova; Ekaterina Reyngold
- Runners-up: (Romania) Cristina Dinu (Slovenia) Nika Radišić
- Score: 3–6, 6–2, [10–8]

Events
Singles	Doubles
- Vrnjačka Banja Open

Darya Astakhova and Ekaterina Reyngold won the title, defeating Cristina Dinu and Nika Radišić in the final, 3–6, 6–2, [10–8].

Cristina Dinu and Valeriya Strakhova were the defending champions but Strakhova chose not to participate. Dinu partnered alongside Nika Radišić, but lost in the final.

== Seeds ==
1. (United States) Jessie Aney / (United States) Christina Rosca (semifinals)
2. Darya Astakhova / Ekaterina Reyngold (champions)
3. (Romania) Cristina Dinu / (Slovenia) Nika Radišić (final)
4. Elina Avanesyan / (France) Elsa Jacquemot (quarterfinals, withdrew)

== Draw ==
Key

- Q = Qualifier
- WC = Wild card
- LL = Lucky loser
- Alt = Alternate
- ITF = ITF entry
- PR = Protected ranking
- SR = Special ranking
- SE = Special exempt
- JE = Junior exempt
- JR = Junior Accelerator Programme entrant
- CO = College Accelerator Programme entrant
- NG = Next Gen Accelerator Program entrant
- w/o = Walkover
- r = Retired
- d = Defaulted

=== Draw ===
First round
(Croatia) L Ćirić Bagarić (Slovakia) R Zelníčková	3	6	[10]
(Serbia) I Jorović (Serbia) E Milovanović	6	2	[8]
(Romania) O Gavrilă (Romania) IG Ghioroaie	6	6
(Serbia) S Deletić (Serbia) S Gvozdenović	0	1
(Serbia) T Čurović (Serbia) L Radivojević	6	6
(Serbia) M Đurašić (Serbia) M Mašić	3	1
E Laskevich; D Lodikova	6	2	[6]
(Turkey) İ Öz (Turkey) M Sezer	0	6	[10]

Quarterfinals
1	(United States) J Aney (United States) C Rosca	w/o
(Croatia) L Ćirić Bagarić (Slovakia) R Zelníčková
3	(Romania) C Dinu (Slovenia) N Radišić	6	5	[10]
(Romania) O Gavrilă (Romania) IG Ghioroaie	2	7	[3]
(Serbia) T Čurović (Serbia) L Radivojević	w/o
3	E Avanesyan (France) E Jacquemot
(Turkey) İ Öz (Turkey) M Sezer	7^{7}	3	[9]
2	D Astakhova; E Reyngold	6^{3}	6	[11]

Semifinals
1	(United States) J Aney (United States) C Rosca	2	4
3	(Romania) C Dinu (Slovenia) N Radišić	6	6
(Serbia) T Čurović (Serbia) L Radivojević	1	2
2	D Astakhova; E Reyngold	6	6

Final
3	(Romania) C Dinu (Slovenia) N Radišić	6	2	[8]
2	D Astakhova; E Reyngold	3	6	[10]
