= 2022 Vrnjačka Banja Open =

Tennis tournament

- Date: 19–25 September 2022
- Edition: 10th
- Category: ITF Women's World Tennis Tour
- Prize money: $60,000
- Surface: Clay / Outdoor
- Location: Vrnjačka Banja, Serbia

Champions

Singles
- (Spain) Aliona Bolsova

Doubles
- Darya Astakhova / Ekaterina Reyngold
- Vrnjačka Banja Open

The 2022 Vrnjačka Banja Open was a professional tennis tournament played on outdoor clay courts. It was the tenth edition of the tournament which was part of the 2022 ITF Women's World Tennis Tour. It took place in Vrnjačka Banja, Serbia between 19 and 25 September 2022.

== Champions ==
=== Singles ===
- (Spain) Aliona Bolsova def. (Slovenia) Nina Potočnik, 7–5, 6–1

=== Doubles ===
- Darya Astakhova / Ekaterina Reyngold def. (Romania) Cristina Dinu / (Slovenia) Nika Radišić, 3–6, 6–2, [10–8]

== Singles main draw entrants ==
=== Seeds ===
Country	Player	Rank^{1}	Seed
	Elina Avanesyan	131	1
ROU	Alexandra Cadanțu-Ignatik	168	2
AUS	Jaimee Fourlis	169	3
FRA	Elsa Jacquemot	188	4
AUT	Sinja Kraus	198	5
CRO	Tena Lukas	200	6
FRA	Séléna Janicijevic	203	7
TUR	İpek Öz	204	8

- ^{1} Rankings are as of 12 September 2022.

=== Other entrants ===
The following players received wildcards into the singles main draw:

- (Croatia) Lucija Ćirić Bagarić
- (Serbia) Ivana Jorović
- (Serbia) Lola Radivojević
- (Serbia) Mia Ristić

The following player received entry into the singles main draw using a protected ranking:

- (Colombia) Emiliana Arango

The following player received entry into the singles main draw as a special exempt:

- (Japan) Misaki Matsuda

The following players received entry from the qualifying draw:

- (United States) Jessie Aney
- (Romania) Oana Gavrilă
- (Switzerland) Bojana Klincov
- Evialina Laskevich
- Daria Lodikova
- (Turkey) Zeynep Sönmez
- (Bulgaria) Gergana Topalova
- (Slovakia) Radka Zelníčková

The following player received entry as a lucky loser:

- (Serbia) Mila Mašić
