= 2025 Jinan Open – Men's singles =

Men's singles
- 2025 Jinan Open

Final
- Champion: (France) Arthur Cazaux
- Runner-up: (United States) Mackenzie McDonald
- Score: 6–3, 6–2

Events
| Singles | men | women |
| Doubles | men | women |
- Jinan Open

Wu Yibing was the defending champion but chose not to defend his title.

Arthur Cazaux won the title after defeating Mackenzie McDonald 6–3, 6–2 in the final.

== Seeds ==
1. (France) Arthur Cazaux (champion)
2. (Australia) Adam Walton (second round)
3. (Serbia) Laslo Djere (first round)
4. (Czech Republic) Dalibor Svrčina (first round)
5. (Australia) Tristan Schoolkate (first round)
6. (United States) Mackenzie McDonald (final)
7. (Japan) Shintaro Mochizuki (semifinals)
8. (Australia) James Duckworth (first round)

== Draw ==
Key

- Q = Qualifier
- WC = Wild card
- LL = Lucky loser
- Alt = Alternate
- ITF = ITF entry
- PR = Protected ranking
- SR = Special ranking
- SE = Special exempt
- JE = Junior exempt
- JR = Junior Accelerator Programme entrant
- CO = College Accelerator Programme entrant
- NG = Next Gen Accelerator Program entrant
- w/o = Walkover
- r = Retired
- d = Defaulted

=== Finals ===
Semifinals
1 | (France) Arthur Cazaux | 6 | 6
7 | (Japan) Shintaro Mochizuki | 1 | 2
Q | Petr Bar Biryukov | 2 | 3
6 | (United States) Mackenzie McDonald | 6 | 6

Final
1 | (France) Arthur Cazaux | 6 | 6
6 | (United States) Mackenzie McDonald | 3 | 2

=== Top half ===
First round
1 | (France) A Cazaux | 6 | 6
(France) U Blanchet | 3 | 4
(Australia) C O'Connell | 6 | 1^{r}
(Canada) L Draxl | 4 | 1
Q | (Kazakhstan) D Yevseyev | 4 | 2
(Australia) R Hijikata | 6 | 6
WC | (China) Y Zhou | 7^{7} | 6
5 | (Australia) T Schoolkate | 6^{2} | 4
4 | (Czech Republic) D Svrčina | 1 | 6 | 2
(Australia) B Tomic | 6 | 0 | 6
(Japan) Y Watanuki | 6 | 3 | 2
(United Kingdom) B Harris | 1 | 6 | 6
Q | (France) K Jacquet | 7 | 6
Q | (Thailand) K Samrej | 5 | 2
Alt | (Australia) J McCabe | 3 | 4
7 | (Japan) S Mochizuki | 6 | 6

Second round
1 | (France) A Cazaux | 6 | 7^{7}
(Canada) L Draxl | 2 | 6^{3}
(Australia) R Hijikata | 5 | 6 | 4
WC | (China) Y Zhou | 7 | 3 | 6
(Australia) B Tomic | 6 | 6^{4} | 6
(United Kingdom) B Harris | 4 | 7^{7} | 2
Q | (France) K Jacquet | 3 | 2
7 | (Japan) S Mochizuki | 6 | 6

Quarterfinals
1 | (France) A Cazaux | 6 | 3 | 6
WC | (China) Y Zhou | 4 | 6 | 0
(Australia) B Tomic | 1 | 4
7 | (Japan) S Mochizuki | 6 | 6

Semifinals
1 | (France) A Cazaux | 6 | 6
7 | (Japan) S Mochizuki | 1 | 2

=== Bottom half ===
First round
8 | (Australia) J Duckworth | 4 | 6^{6}
(United States) C Smith | 6 | 7^{8}
(France) T Droguet | 6 | 6
WC | (China) J Cui | 4 | 1
Q | P Bar Biryukov | 7^{7} | 4 | 6
(Japan) T Daniel | 6^{5} | 6 | 3
(Hong Kong) C Wong | 7^{12} | 6
3 | (Serbia) L Djere | 6^{10} | 2
6 | (United States) M McDonald | 6 | 7^{7}
(France) H Mayot | 3 | 6^{2}
Q | P Kotov | 6 | 6
(Denmark) A Holmgren | 3 | 4
(United States) B Holt | 3 | 6 | 6
Q | Maxim Zhukov | 6 | 4 | 3
WC | (China) F Sun | 6 | 5 | 4
2 | (Australia) A Walton | 3 | 7 | 6

Second round
(United States) C Smith | 6 | 3 | 7
(France) T Droguet | 1 | 6 | 5
Q | P Bar Biryukov | 6 | 6^{5} | 7^{7}
(Hong Kong) C Wong | 4 | 7^{7} | 6^{5}
6 | (United States) M McDonald | 7 | 6
Q | P Kotov | 5 | 2
(United States) B Holt | 6 | 6
2 | (Australia) A Walton | 4 | 3

Quarterfinals
(United States) C Smith | 4 | 6^{4}
Q | P Bar Biryukov | 6 | 7^{7}
6 | (United States) M McDonald | 6 | 4 | 7^{9}
(United States) B Holt | 3 | 6 | 6^{7}

Semifinals
Q | P Bar Biryukov | 2 | 3
6 | (United States) M McDonald | 6 | 6
