= 2023 Torneig Internacional Els Gorchs – Doubles =

Doubles
- 2023 Torneig Internacional Els Gorchs

Final
- Champions: (Italy) Angelica Moratelli (Italy) Camilla Rosatello
- Runners-up: (China) Gao Xinyu (Latvia) Darja Semeņistaja
- Score: 4–6, 7–5, [10–6]

Events
Singles	Doubles
- Torneig Internacional Els Gorchs

Aliona Bolsova and Rebeka Masarova are the defending champions but Masarova chose not to participate. Bolsova played alongside Natela Dzalamidze, but lost in the semifinals to Gao Xinyu and Darja Semeņistaja.

Angelica Moratelli and Camilla Rosatello won the title, defeating Gao and Semeņistaja in the final, 4–6, 7–5, [10–6].

== Seeds ==
1. (Italy) Angelica Moratelli / (Italy) Camilla Rosatello (champions)
2. (Spain) Aliona Bolsova / (Georgia (country)) Natela Dzalamidze (semifinals)
3. (Netherlands) Arantxa Rus / (Slovenia) Tamara Zidanšek (first round, withdrew)
4. (Spain) Yvonne Cavallé Reimers / (United States) Chiara Scholl (first round, withdrew)

== Draw ==
Key

- Q = Qualifier
- WC = Wild card
- LL = Lucky loser
- Alt = Alternate
- ITF = ITF entry
- PR = Protected ranking
- SR = Special ranking
- SE = Special exempt
- JE = Junior exempt
- JR = Junior Accelerator Programme entrant
- CO = College Accelerator Programme entrant
- NG = Next Gen Accelerator Program entrant
- w/o = Walkover
- r = Retired
- d = Defaulted

=== Draw ===
First round
1	(Italy) A Moratelli (Italy) C Rosatello	1	7^{7}	[10]
A Charaeva (Israel) L Glushko	6	6^{2}	[7]
(Spain) J Bouzas Maneiro (Spain) G Maristany	1	6	[3]
(Venezuela) A Gámiz; V Savinykh	6	4	[10]
3	(Netherlands) A Rus (Slovenia) T Zidanšek
(Spain) M Bassols Ribera (Greece) D Papamichail	w/o
(Spain) C García Alonso (Spain) R Roura Llaverias	w/o
(Spain) I Burillo Escorihuela (Spain) A Lázaro García
(China) X Gao (Latvia) D Semeņistaja	7	6
(Denmark) O Gram (Germany) S-R Sekulic	5	2
(Spain) P Ortega Redondo (France) L Petretic	w/o
4	(Spain) Y Cavallé Reimers (United States) C Scholl
(United States) S Alicea (Republic of Ireland) C Simunyu	6	6
(Spain) A Giraldi Requena (Spain) M Oliver Sánchez	4	3
(Argentina) O de Fazio (India) S Patil	0	2
2	(Spain) A Bolsova (Georgia (country)) N Dzalamidze	6	6

Quarterfinals
1	(Italy) A Moratelli (Italy) C Rosatello	6	6
(Venezuela) A Gámiz; V Savinykh	0	3
(Spain) M Bassols Ribera (Greece) D Papamichail	6	6
(Spain) C Garcia Alonso (Spain) R Roura Llaverias	3	1
(China) X Gao (Latvia) D Semeņistaja	7	6
(Spain) P Ortega Redondo (France) L Petretic	5	1
(United States) S Alicea (Republic of Ireland) C Simunyu	4	5
2	(Spain) A Bolsova (Georgia (country)) N Dzalamidze	6	7

Semifinals
1	(Italy) A Moratelli (Italy) C Rosatello	6	6
(Spain) M Bassols Ribera (Greece) D Papamichail	4	2
(China) X Gao (Latvia) D Semeņistaja	4	6	[15]
2	(Spain) A Bolsova (Georgia (country)) N Dzalamidze	6	2	[13]

Final
1	(Italy) A Moratelli (Italy) C Rosatello	4	7	[10]
(China) X Gao (Latvia) D Semeņistaja	6	5	[6]
