= 2021 Prague Open =

Women's tennis tournament

- Date: 12–18 July
- Edition: 12th
- Category: WTA 250
- Draw: 32S / 16D
- Surface: Hard / outdoor
- Location: Prague, Czech Republic
- Venue: TK Sparta Prague

Champions

Singles
- (Czech Republic) Barbora Krejčíková

Doubles
- (Czech Republic) Marie Bouzková / (Czech Republic) Lucie Hradecká
- WTA Prague Open

The 2021 Prague Open (branded as the 2021 Livesport Prague Open for sponsorship reasons) was a professional women's tennis tournament played on outdoor hard courts at the TK Sparta Prague. It was the 12th (WTA and non-WTA) edition of the tournament which was part of the 2021 WTA Tour, and of the 250 series of tournaments. It took place in Prague, Czech Republic between 12 and 18 July 2021. This was the first edition of the tournament held on outdoor hard courts, as opposed to clay courts in previous editions.

== Finals ==
=== Singles ===
- (Czech Republic) Barbora Krejčíková defeated (Czech Republic) Tereza Martincová, 6–2, 6–0.

This was Krejčíková's third WTA singles title of the year.

=== Doubles ===
- (Czech Republic) Marie Bouzková / (Czech Republic) Lucie Hradecká defeated (Slovakia) Viktória Kužmová / (Serbia) Nina Stojanović, 7–6^{(7–3)}, 6–4.

== Singles main draw entrants ==
=== Seeds ===
Country	Player	Rank^{1}	Seed
CZE	Petra Kvitová	10	1
CZE	Barbora Krejčíková	17	2
~~CZE~~	~~Markéta Vondroušová~~	~~42~~	~~3~~
CZE	Marie Bouzková	52	4
CZE	Kateřina Siniaková	64	5
~~TPE~~	~~Hsieh Su-wei~~	~~69~~	~~6~~
SRB	Nina Stojanović	86	7
CZE	Tereza Martincová	87	8
BEL	Greet Minnen	118	9

- Rankings are as of June 28, 2021

=== Other entrants ===
The following players received wildcards into the singles main draw:

- (Czech Republic) Lucie Havlíčková
- (Slovakia) Viktória Kužmová
- (Australia) Samantha Stosur

The following players received entry using protected rankings:

- (Russia) Vitalia Diatchenko
- (United Kingdom) Samantha Murray Sharan
- (Czech Republic) Tereza Smitková

The following player received entry as a special exempt:

- ~~(Romania) Elena-Gabriela Ruse~~

The following players received entry from the qualifying draw:

- (United Kingdom) Naiktha Bains
- (United Kingdom) Jodie Burrage
- (United States) Asia Muhammad
- (Poland) Urszula Radwańska
- (Bulgaria) Isabella Shinikova
- (Slovakia) Rebecca Šramková

The following players received entry as lucky losers:

- (Russia) Anastasia Gasanova
- (Chinese Taipei) Liang En-shuo
- (Switzerland) Conny Perrin

=== Withdrawals ===
Before the tournament

- (Switzerland) Belinda Bencic → replaced by (Australia) Maddison Inglis
- (France) Océane Dodin → replaced by (United Kingdom) Samantha Murray Sharan
- (Chinese Taipei) Hsieh Su-wei → replaced by (Switzerland) Conny Perrin
- (Tunisia) Ons Jabeur → replaced by (Switzerland) Leonie Küng
- (Russia) Daria Kasatkina → replaced by (China) Wang Xinyu
- (United States) Claire Liu → replaced by (Czech Republic) Tereza Smitková
- (Bulgaria) Tsvetana Pironkova → replaced by (United States) Grace Min
- (Romania) Elena-Gabriela Ruse → replaced by (Russia) Anastasia Gasanova
- (Denmark) Clara Tauson → replaced by (Spain) Nuria Párrizas Díaz
- (Australia) Ajla Tomljanović → replaced by (Australia) Lizette Cabrera
- (Czech Republic) Markéta Vondroušová → replaced by (Chinese Taipei) Liang En-shuo
- (United Kingdom) Heather Watson → replaced by (Italy) Giulia Gatto-Monticone
- (Russia) Vera Zvonareva → replaced by (Australia) Storm Sanders

== Doubles main draw entrants ==
=== Seeds ===
Country	Player	Country	Player	Rank^{1}	Seed
SVK	Viktória Kužmová	SRB	Nina Stojanović	87	1
USA	Asia Muhammad	AUS	Storm Sanders	95	2
CZE	Marie Bouzková	CZE	Lucie Hradecká	102	3
SUI	Conny Perrin	NED	Rosalie van der Hoek	296	4

- ^{1} Rankings are as of June 28, 2021

=== Other entrants ===
The following pairs received wildcards into the doubles main draw:

- (Czech Republic) Lucie Havlíčková / (Czech Republic) Miriam Kolodziejová
- (Czech Republic) Linda Klimovičová / (Czech Republic) Barbora Palicová

=== Withdrawals ===
Before the tournament

- (Russia) Anastasia Gasanova / (Serbia) Natalija Kostić → replaced by (Russia) Anastasia Gasanova / (Bulgaria) Isabella Shinikova
- (Australia) Ellen Perez / (Australia) Samantha Stosur → replaced by (United Kingdom) Jodie Burrage / (Australia) Samantha Stosur
- (India) Ankita Raina / (Netherlands) Rosalie van der Hoek → replaced by (Switzerland) Conny Perrin / (Netherlands) Rosalie van der Hoek

=== Retirements ===
- (Switzerland) Conny Perrin / (Netherlands) Rosalie van der Hoek
