= 2024 Torneig Internacional Els Gorchs – Singles =

Singles
- 2024 Torneig Internacional Els Gorchs

Final
- Champion: Anastasia Zakharova
- Runner-up: Alina Charaeva
- Score: 6–3, 6–1

Events
Singles	Doubles
- Torneig Internacional Els Gorchs

Magdalena Fręch was the defending champion but chose to compete in Tokyo instead.

Anastasia Zakharova won the title, defeating Alina Charaeva in the final, 6–3, 6–1.

== Seeds ==
1. (Italy) Sara Errani (second round)
2. (Slovakia) Anna Karolína Schmiedlová (semifinals)
3. (Ukraine) Daria Snigur (first round)
4. (Hungary) Dalma Gálfi (quarterfinals)
5. Anastasia Zakharova (champion)
6. (Spain) Marina Bassols Ribera (first round)
7. (United Kingdom) Heather Watson (withdrew)
8. (Serbia) Lola Radivojević (quarterfinals)
9. (Spain) Guiomar Maristany (first round)

== Draw ==
Key

- Q = Qualifier
- WC = Wild card
- LL = Lucky loser
- Alt = Alternate
- ITF = ITF entry
- PR = Protected ranking
- SR = Special ranking
- SE = Special exempt
- JE = Junior exempt
- JR = Junior Accelerator Programme entrant
- CO = College Accelerator Programme entrant
- NG = Next Gen Accelerator Program entrant
- w/o = Walkover
- r = Retired
- d = Defaulted

=== Finals ===
Semifinals
(France) Kristina Mladenovic	4	6	3
Alina Charaeva	6	3	6
5	Anastasia Zakharova	7	6
2	(Slovakia) Anna Karolína Schmiedlová	5	1

Final
Alina Charaeva	3	1
5	Anastasia Zakharova	6	6

=== Top half ===
First round
1	(Italy) S Errani	6	5	6
WC	E Reyngold	3	7	0
WC	(Spain) R Roura Llaverias	4	3
(France) K Mladenovic	6	6
Q	(Slovakia) R Jamrichová	6	7^{7}
WC	(Spain) K Quevedo	1	6^{4}
WC	(Spain) A Geerlings	7	0	7
9	(Spain) G Maristany	5	6	5
3	(Ukraine) D Snigur	3	5
(Spain) A Lázaro García	6	7
Q	(Germany) M Hodzic	3	7	6
LL	M Kalyakina	6	5	3
(Spain) Á Fita Boluda	6	5	6
Q	(Germany) C Werner	2	7	4
A Charaeva	6	4	6
6	(Spain) M Bassols Ribera	3	6	2

Second round
1	(Italy) S Errani	4	6^{5}
(France) K Mladenovic	6	7^{7}
Q	(Slovakia) R Jamrichová	1	6	7
WC	(Spain) A Geerlings	6	1	5
(Spain) A Lázaro García	6	6
Q	(Germany) M Hodzic	3	2
(Spain) Á Fita Boluda	1^{r}
A Charaeva	3

Quarterfinals
(France) K Mladenovic	7	7^{7}
Q	(Slovakia) R Jamrichová	5	6^{4}
(Spain) A Lázaro García	2	3
A Charaeva	6	6

Semifinals
(France) K Mladenovic	4	6	3
A Charaeva	6	3	6

=== Bottom half ===
First round
5	A Zakharova	6	6
Q	(United States) J Daniel	2	3
O Selekhmeteva	6^{5}	4
(Greece) D Papamichail	7^{7}	6
(Czech Republic) A Kučmová	6	7
Q	(Spain) L Cortez Llorca	4	5
V Savinykh	2	2
4	(Hungary) D Gálfi	6	6
8	(Serbia) L Radivojević	7	6
Q	(China) T Mi	5	3
Q	(France) N Berecoechea	6	1	6
(North Macedonia) L Gjorcheska	4	6	2
(Turkey) B Cengiz	6	6
Q	A Anshba	4	4
(Portugal) F Jorge	1	3
2	(Slovakia) AK Schmiedlová	6	6

Second round
5	A Zakharova	7	6
(Greece) D Papamichail	5	2
(Czech Republic) A Kučmová	5	4
4	(Hungary) D Gálfi	7	6
8	(Serbia) L Radivojević	7	4	7^{7}
Q	(France) N Berecoechea	5	6	6^{3}
(Turkey) B Cengiz	2	6	1
2	(Slovakia) AK Schmiedlová	6	2	6

Quarterfinals
5	A Zakharova	6	6
4	(Hungary) D Gálfi	1	1
8	(Serbia) L Radivojević	4	1
2	(Slovakia) AK Schmiedlová	6	6

Semifinals
5	A Zakharova	7	6
2	(Slovakia) AK Schmiedlová	5	1
