= 2022 Torneig Internacional Els Gorchs – Doubles =

Doubles
- 2022 Torneig Internacional Els Gorchs

Final
- Champions: (Spain) Aliona Bolsova (Spain) Rebeka Masarova
- Runners-up: (Japan) Misaki Doi (Indonesia) Beatrice Gumulya
- Score: 7–5, 1–6, [10–3]

Events
Singles	Doubles
- Torneig Internacional Els Gorchs

Irina Khromacheva and Arina Rodionova were the defending champions but chose not to participate.

Aliona Bolsova and Rebeka Masarova won the title, defeating Misaki Doi and Beatrice Gumulya in the final, 7–5, 1–6, [10–3].

== Seeds ==
1. (Japan) Misaki Doi / (Indonesia) Beatrice Gumulya (final)
2. (Spain) Aliona Bolsova / (Spain) Rebeka Masarova (champions)
3. (Serbia) Olga Danilović / (Serbia) Natalija Stevanović (first round, withdrew)
4. (Andorra) Victoria Jiménez Kasintseva / (Netherlands) Arantxa Rus (first round)

== Draw ==
Key

- Q = Qualifier
- WC = Wild card
- LL = Lucky loser
- Alt = Alternate
- ITF = ITF entry
- PR = Protected ranking
- SR = Special ranking
- SE = Special exempt
- JE = Junior exempt
- JR = Junior Accelerator Programme entrant
- CO = College Accelerator Programme entrant
- NG = Next Gen Accelerator Program entrant
- w/o = Walkover
- r = Retired
- d = Defaulted

=== Draw ===
First round
1	(Japan) M Doi (Indonesia) B Gumulya	4	6	[10]
(Netherlands) I Haverlag (France) L Jeanjean	6	1	[8]
(Spain) P Ortega Redondo (South Korea) J-h Shin	6^{4}	6	[10]
(Spain) A Briones Ginesta (Spain) E López Alcaraz	7^{7}	3	[5]
4	(Andorra) V Jiménez Kasintseva (Netherlands) A Rus	6	3	[3]
(Spain) Y Cavallé Reimers (Spain) R Vicens Mas	3	6	[10]
(Belgium) M Benoît (Slovenia) N Radišić	6	6
WC	(United States) J Fenton (Spain) J Rovira Alier	1	2
(Spain) C Hoste Ferrer; K Laskutova	7^{7}	6
(France) L Petretic (Germany) Jo Steur	6^{4}	3
(Malta) F Curmi (Algeria) I Ibbou	w/o
3	(Serbia) O Danilović (Serbia) N Stevanović
(Spain) A Lázaro García (Hungary) A Nagy	7	6
(Spain) M Bassols Ribera (Spain) I Burillo Escorihuela	5	2
(Ukraine) M Kolb (Ukraine) N Kolb	1	2
2	(Spain) A Bolsova (Spain) R Masarova	6	6

Quarterfinals
1	(Japan) M Doi (Indonesia) B Gumulya	6	6
(Spain) P Ortega Redondo (South Korea) J-h Shin	1	1
(Spain) Y Cavallé Reimers (Spain) R Vicens Mas	4	6	[10]
(Belgium) M Benoît (Slovenia) N Radišić	6	3	[7]
(Spain) C Hoste Ferrer; K Laskutova	6^{5}	6^{4}
(Malta) F Curmi (Algeria) I Ibbou	7^{7}	7^{7}
(Spain) A Lázaro García (Hungary) A Nagy	2	4
2	(Spain) A Bolsova (Spain) R Masarova	6	6

Semifinals
1	(Japan) M Doi (Indonesia) B Gumulya	6	6
(Spain) Y Cavallé Reimers (Spain) R Vicens Mas	3	4
(Malta) F Curmi (Algeria) I Ibbou	3	3
2	(Spain) A Bolsova (Spain) R Masarova	6	6

Final
1	(Japan) M Doi (Indonesia) B Gumulya	5	6	[3]
2	(Spain) A Bolsova (Spain) R Masarova	7	1	[10]
