= 2024 Torneig Internacional Els Gorchs – Doubles =

Doubles
- 2024 Torneig Internacional Els Gorchs

Final
- Champions: Alina Charaeva; Ekaterina Reyngold
- Runners-up: (Germany) Mina Hodzic (Germany) Caroline Werner
- Score: 6–2, 7–6^{(7–2)}

Events
Singles	Doubles
- Torneig Internacional Els Gorchs

Angelica Moratelli and Camilla Rosatello are the defending champions but Moratelli chose to compete in Guangzhou and Rosatello chose not to participate.

Alina Charaeva and Ekaterina Reyngold won the title, defeating Mina Hodzic and Caroline Werner in the final, 6–2, 7–6^{(7–2)}.

== Seeds ==
1. (Portugal) Francisca Jorge / (Greece) Despina Papamichail (quarterfinals)
2. Amina Anshba / (Bulgaria) Lia Karatancheva (first round)
3. (Ukraine) Maryna Kolb / (Ukraine) Nadiia Kolb (quarterfinals, withdrew)
4. (France) Elixane Lechemia / (Poland) Alicja Rosolska (first round)

== Draw ==
Key

- Q = Qualifier
- WC = Wild card
- LL = Lucky loser
- Alt = Alternate
- ITF = ITF entry
- PR = Protected ranking
- SR = Special ranking
- SE = Special exempt
- JE = Junior exempt
- JR = Junior Accelerator Programme entrant
- CO = College Accelerator Programme entrant
- NG = Next Gen Accelerator Program entrant
- w/o = Walkover
- r = Retired
- d = Defaulted

=== Draw ===
First round
1	(Portugal) F Jorge (Greece) D Papamichail	7	6
(France) N Berecoechea (United States) J Daniel	5	2
(Spain) AP Bastos-Sousa Betanzos (Bulgaria) V Lazarova	0	1
A Charaeva; E Reyngold	6	6
4	(France) E Lechemia (Poland) A Rosolska	6	3	[6]
(Czech Republic) A Kučmová (Serbia) L Radivojević	4	6	[10]
WC	(Australia) W Chan (Switzerland) N Fehr	0	1
(Spain) A Lázaro García (Spain) G Maristany	6	6
(Germany) M Hodzic (Germany) C Werner	6	7^{7}
WC	(Spain) A Giraldi Requena (China) M Liu	1	6^{4}
(Denmark) O Gram (Peru) A Iamachkine	1	2
3	(Ukraine) M Kolb (Ukraine) N Kolb	6	6
(Spain) C Garcia Alonso (Spain) P Ortega Redondo	6	6
M Lubsheva (Spain) P Rodríguez Carretero	1	4
(Turkey) B Cengiz (United Kingdom) M Lumsden	7^{7}	5	[10]
2	A Anshba (Bulgaria) L Karatancheva	6^{5}	7	[4]

Quarterfinals
1	(Portugal) F Jorge (Greece) D Papamichail	6	0	[10]
A Charaeva; E Reyngold	3	6	[12]
(Czech Republic) A Kučmová (Serbia) L Radivojević	6	6
(Spain) A Lázaro García (Spain) G Maristany	3	2
(Germany) M Hodzic (Germany) C Werner	w/o
3	(Ukraine) M Kolb (Ukraine) N Kolb
(Spain) C Garcia Alonso (Spain) P Ortega Redondo	2	0
(Turkey) B Cengiz (United Kingdom) M Lumsden	6	6

Semifinals
A Charaeva; E Reyngold	6	6
(Czech Republic) A Kučmová (Serbia) L Radivojević	4	3
(Germany) M Hodzic (Germany) C Werner	6	2	[10]
(Turkey) B Cengiz (United Kingdom) M Lumsden	4	6	[8]

Final
A Charaeva; E Reyngold	6	7^{7}
(Germany) M Hodzic (Germany) C Werner	2	6^{2}
