= 2022 Torneig Internacional Els Gorchs – Singles =

Singles
- 2022 Torneig Internacional Els Gorchs

Final
- Champion: (Italy) Jasmine Paolini
- Runner-up: (Ukraine) Kateryna Baindl
- Score: 6–4, 6–4

Events
Singles	Doubles
- Torneig Internacional Els Gorchs

Maryna Zanevska was the defending champion but withdrew from the tournament.

Jasmine Paolini won the title, defeating Kateryna Baindl in the final, 6–4, 6–4.

== Seeds ==
1. (Ukraine) Anhelina Kalinina (first round)
2. (Italy) Jasmine Paolini (champion)
3. (Germany) Tamara Korpatsch (first round)
4. (Slovakia) Anna Karolína Schmiedlová (semifinals)
5. (Romania) Elena-Gabriela Ruse (first round)
6. (Italy) Sara Errani (quarterfinals)
7. (Switzerland) Simona Waltert (second round)
8. (Netherlands) Arantxa Rus (first round)

== Draw ==
Key

- Q = Qualifier
- WC = Wild card
- LL = Lucky loser
- Alt = Alternate
- ITF = ITF entry
- PR = Protected ranking
- SR = Special ranking
- SE = Special exempt
- JE = Junior exempt
- JR = Junior Accelerator Programme entrant
- CO = College Accelerator Programme entrant
- NG = Next Gen Accelerator Program entrant
- w/o = Walkover
- r = Retired
- d = Defaulted

=== Finals ===
Semifinals
(Ukraine) Kateryna Baindl	6	7^{7}
4	(Slovakia) Anna Karolína Schmiedlová	4	6^{2}
Erika Andreeva	1	1
2	(Italy) Jasmine Paolini	6	6

Final
(Ukraine) Kateryna Baindl	4	4
2	(Italy) Jasmine Paolini	6	6

=== Top half ===
First round
1	(Ukraine) A Kalinina	3	6	3
WC	(Spain) A Lázaro García	6	3	6
Q	(Slovenia) N Radišić	7^{7}	6^{6}	1
Q	K Laskutova	6^{3}	7^{8}	6
Q	(South Korea) J-h Shin	1	2
WC	(Spain) Y Cavallé Reimers	6	6
(Ukraine) K Baindl	3	6	7^{14}
8	(Netherlands) A Rus	6	1	6^{12}
4	(Slovakia) AK Schmiedlová	6	6
(Japan) M Doi	4	4
(Serbia) O Danilović	4	3
WC	(Spain) R Vicens Mas	6	6
Q	(Belgium) M Benoît	6	6
Q	(Latvia) D Semenistaja	1	1
(Switzerland) J Züger	0^{r}
6	(Italy) S Errani	4

Second round
WC	(Spain) A Lázaro García	6	6
Q	K Laskutova	3	2
WC	(Spain) Y Cavallé Reimers	2	5
(Ukraine) K Baindl	6	7
4	(Slovakia) AK Schmiedlová	6	6
WC	(Spain) R Vicens Mas	1	1
Q	(Belgium) M Benoît	4	4
6	(Italy) S Errani	6	6

Quarterfinals
WC	(Spain) A Lázaro García	3	0
(Ukraine) K Baindl	6	6
4	(Slovakia) AK Schmiedlová	7^{7}	6
6	(Italy) S Errani	6^{4}	4

Semifinals
(Ukraine) K Baindl	6	7^{7}
4	(Slovakia) AK Schmiedlová	4	6^{2}

=== Bottom half ===
First round
5	(Romania) E-G Ruse	2	2
(Spain) M Bassols Ribera	6	6
Q	(Spain) M González Encinas	3	2
E Andreeva	6	6
WC	(Spain) I Burillo Escorihuela	1	2
(Andorra) V Jiménez Kasintseva	6	6
(Spain) A Bolsova	6	4	6
3	(Germany) T Korpatsch	2	6	0
7	(Switzerland) S Waltert	6	1
(France) K Mladenovic	0	0^{r}
(France) L Jeanjean	2	6^{6}
SE	(Spain) R Masarova	6	7^{8}
K Rakhimova	6	6^{8}	6
Q	(Malta) F Curmi	3	7^{10}	1
Q	(Serbia) N Stevanović	1	4
2	(Italy) J Paolini	6	6

Second round
(Spain) M Bassols Ribera	1	6	6^{2}
E Andreeva	6	3	7^{7}
(Andorra) V Jiménez Kasintseva	6	6
(Spain) A Bolsova	4	2
7	(Switzerland) S Waltert	6	3	4
SE	(Spain) R Masarova	2	6	6
K Rakhimova	2	3
2	(Italy) J Paolini	6	6

Quarterfinals
E Andreeva	3	7^{7}	6
(Andorra) V Jiménez Kasintseva	6	6^{2}	0
SE	(Spain) R Masarova	2	6	5
2	(Italy) J Paolini	6	4	7

Semifinals
E Andreeva	1	1
2	(Italy) J Paolini	6	6
