= 2025 Jinan Open – Men's doubles =

Men's doubles
- 2025 Jinan Open

Final
- Champions: (New Zealand) Finn Reynolds (New Zealand) James Watt
- Runners-up: (India) Rithvik Choudary Bollipalli (India) Arjun Kadhe
- Score: 7–5, 7–6^{(7–1)}

Events
Singles	men	women
Doubles	men	women
- Jinan Open

Chung Yun-seong and Yuta Shimizu were the defending champions but chose not to defend their title.

Finn Reynolds and James Watt won the title after defeating Rithvik Choudary Bollipalli and Arjun Kadhe 7–5, 7–6^{(7–1)} in the final.

== Seeds ==
1. (India) Rithvik Choudary Bollipalli / (India) Arjun Kadhe (final)
2. (Australia) Blake Bayldon / (United States) Nathaniel Lammons (semifinals)
3. (New Zealand) Finn Reynolds / (New Zealand) James Watt (champions)
4. (South Korea) Nam Ji-sung / (Japan) Takeru Yuzuki (semifinals)

== Draw ==
Key

- Q = Qualifier
- WC = Wild card
- LL = Lucky loser
- Alt = Alternate
- ITF = ITF entry
- PR = Protected ranking
- SR = Special ranking
- SE = Special exempt
- JE = Junior exempt
- JR = Junior Accelerator Programme entrant
- CO = College Accelerator Programme entrant
- NG = Next Gen Accelerator Program entrant
- w/o = Walkover
- r = Retired
- d = Defaulted

=== Draw ===
First round
1	(India) RC Bollipalli (India) A Kadhe	7^{7}	7^{7}
Alt	P Bar Biryukov; Maxim Zhukov	6^{2}	6^{4}
(Japan) K Uesugi (Japan) S Watanabe	7	6
WC	(China) Xiao Linang (China) Zhang Tianhui	5	2
4	(South Korea) J-s Nam (Japan) T Yuzuki	6	6
(South Korea) U-s Park (China) A Wang	4	3
(Chinese Taipei) J Jung (India) J Nedunchezhiyan	5	6	[11]
(Chinese Taipei) T-h Huang (China) F Sun	7	4	[9]
(Thailand) P Isaro (India) N Kaliyanda Poonacha	5	4
Alt	(Japan) R Noguchi (Thailand) K Samrej	7	6
(France) K Jacquet (France) H Mayot	6^{1}	2
3	(New Zealand) F Reynolds (New Zealand) J Watt	7^{7}	6
Alt	(Chinese Taipei) C-p Hsieh (Japan) A Santillan	6	6
(China) J Cui (Colombia) A Soriano Barrera	2	4
Alt	(Chinese Taipei) J Hsu (United States) E Zhu	3	5
2	(Australia) B Bayldon (United States) N Lammons	6	7

Quarterfinals
1	(India) RC Bollipalli (India) A Kadhe	6	6
(Japan) K Uesugi (Japan) S Watanabe	3	3
4	(South Korea) J-s Nam (Japan) T Yuzuki	7^{7}	6
(Chinese Taipei) J Jung (India) J Nedunchezhiyan	6^{5}	3
Alt	(Japan) R Noguchi (Thailand) K Samrej	1	2
3	(New Zealand) F Reynolds (New Zealand) J Watt	6	6
Alt	(Chinese Taipei) C-p Hsieh (Japan) A Santillan	4	6^{3}
2	(Australia) B Bayldon (United States) N Lammons	6	7^{7}

Semifinals
1	(India) RC Bollipalli (India) A Kadhe	6^{3}	6	[10]
4	(South Korea) J-s Nam (Japan) T Yuzuki	7^{7}	4	[5]
3	(New Zealand) F Reynolds (New Zealand) J Watt	6	6
2	(Australia) B Bayldon (United States) N Lammons	4	4

Final
1	(India) RC Bollipalli (India) A Kadhe	5	6^{1}
3	(New Zealand) F Reynolds (New Zealand) J Watt	7	7^{7}
