= 2025 Jinan Open – Women's singles =

Women's singles
- 2025 Jinan Open

Final
- Champion: (Indonesia) Janice Tjen
- Runner-up: (Hungary) Anna Bondár
- Score: 6–4, 4–6, 6–4

Details
- Draw: 32 (4Q / 3WC)
- Seeds: 8

Events
Singles	men	women
Doubles	men	women
- Jinan Open

Janice Tjen won the title, defeating Anna Bondár in the final, 6–4, 4–6, 6–4. She saved two match points en route to her first WTA 125 title, in the semifinals against Lulu Sun.

Zheng Wushuang was the defending champion from 2024 when the tournament was held as an ITF W50 event, but lost in the first round of qualifying to Tian Fangran.

== Seeds ==
1. Anastasia Zakharova (quarterfinals)
2. (Hungary) Anna Bondár (final)
3. (Indonesia) Janice Tjen (champion)
4. (Slovenia) Veronika Erjavec (second round)
5. (Andorra) Victoria Jiménez Kasintseva (first round)
6. (New Zealand) Lulu Sun (semifinals)
7. (France) Tiantsoa Rakotomanga Rajaonah (first round)
8. (United States) Whitney Osuigwe (second round)

== Draw ==
Key

- Q = Qualifier
- WC = Wild card
- LL = Lucky loser
- Alt = Alternate
- ITF = ITF entry
- PR = Protected ranking
- SR = Special ranking
- SE = Special exempt
- JE = Junior exempt
- JR = Junior Accelerator Programme entrant
- CO = College Accelerator Programme entrant
- NG = Next Gen Accelerator Program entrant
- w/o = Walkover
- r = Retired
- d = Defaulted

=== Finals ===
Semifinals
6	(New Zealand) Lulu Sun	6	6^{7}	4
3	(Indonesia) Janice Tjen	4	7^{9}	6
Q	(Indonesia) Priska Nugroho	4	0
2	(Hungary) Anna Bondár	6	6

Final
3	(Indonesia) Janice Tjen	6	4	6
2	(Hungary) Anna Bondár	4	6	4

=== Top half ===
First round
1	A Zakharova	6	6
(Thailand) L Tararudee	2	1
T Prozorova	6	7^{7}
Q	E Reyngold	2	6^{3}
WC	(China) X Li	1	5
(Netherlands) A Hartono	6	7
WC	(China) H Shi	6	0	0
6	(New Zealand) L Sun	3	6	6
3	(Indonesia) J Tjen	6	6^{4}	6
WC	(China) Y Wang	4	7^{7}	2
P Iatcenko	1	6	6
E Pridankina	6	4	2
(Japan) H Kaji	4	6	7
WC	(China) Y Ren	6	2	5
(China) X Gao	7^{7}	6
7	(France) T Rakotomanga Rajaonah	6^{3}	3

Second round
1	A Zakharova	6	6
T Prozorova	1	2
(Netherlands) A Hartono	1	2
6	(New Zealand) L Sun	6	6
3	(Indonesia) J Tjen	6	6
P Iatcenko	3	4
(Japan) H Kaji	3	3
(China) X Gao	6	6

Quarterfinals
1	A Zakharova	6^{1}	0
6	(New Zealand) L Sun	7^{7}	6
3	(Indonesia) J Tjen	6	6
(China) X Gao	4	0

Semifinals
6	(New Zealand) L Sun	6	6^{7}	4
3	(Indonesia) J Tjen	4	7^{9}	6

=== Bottom half ===
First round
8	(United States) W Osuigwe	6	6
(France) C Paquet	2	4
Q	(Indonesia) P Nugroho	5	6	6
PR	(China) Z Bai	7	3	4
(Australia) Ar Rodionova	7	6
E Andreeva	5	3
Q	(China) F Tian	3	5
4	(Slovenia) V Erjavec	6	7
5	(Andorra) V Jiménez Kasintseva	6	4	3
(China) Y Ma	3	6	6
A Korneeva	3	6	6
(China) X You	6	3	2
(China) S Wei	7	7^{7}
Q	(Ukraine) K Zavatska	5	6^{4}
PR	D Astakhova	2	0
2	(Hungary) A Bondár	6	6

Second round
8	(United States) W Osuigwe	6	2	4
Q	(Indonesia) P Nugroho	2	6	6
(Australia) Ar Rodionova	6	6^{4}	6
4	(Slovenia) V Erjavec	2	7^{7}	2
(China) Y Ma	6	6
A Korneeva	3	3
(China) S Wei	1	5
2	(Hungary) A Bondár	6	7

Quarterfinals
Q	(Indonesia) P Nugroho	1	6	6
(Australia) Ar Rodionova	6	2	2
(China) Y Ma	6^{10}	2
2	(Hungary) A Bondár	7^{12}	6

Semifinals
Q	(Indonesia) P Nugroho	4	0
2	(Hungary) A Bondár	6	6

== Qualifying ==
=== Seeds ===
1. (South Korea) Ku Yeon-woo (first round)
2. (China) Zheng Wushuang (first round)
3. Aliona Falei (qualifying competition)
4. (China) Yao Xinxin (first round)
5. (Indonesia) Priska Nugroho (qualified)
6. Ekaterina Reyngold (qualified)
7. (Japan) Saki Imamura (qualifying competition)
8. (China) Lu Jiajing (first round)

=== Qualifiers ===
1. (Ukraine) Katarina Zavatska
2. (China) Tian Fangran
3. Ekaterina Reyngold
4. (Indonesia) Priska Nugroho

=== Qualifying draw ===
==== First qualifier ====
First round
1	(South Korea) Ku Yeon-woo	4	6	5
(Ukraine) Katarina Zavatska	6	2	7
Ekaterina Ovcharenko	2	6	7
8	(China) Lu Jiajing	6	1	5

Qualifying competition
(Ukraine) Katarina Zavatska	6	3	6
Ekaterina Ovcharenko	2	6	0

==== Second qualifier ====
First round
2	(China) Zheng Wushuang	3	4
(China) Tian Fangran	6	6
(India) Riya Bhatia	2	4
7	(Japan) Saki Imamura	6	6

Qualifying competition
(China) Tian Fangran	6	6
7	(Japan) Saki Imamura	2	3

==== Third qualifier ====
First round
3	Aliona Falei	6	7
(India) Ankita Raina	0	5
WC	(China) Zhu Chenting	4	2
6	Ekaterina Reyngold	6	6

Qualifying competition
3	Aliona Falei	2	7	3
6	Ekaterina Reyngold	6	5	6

==== Fourth qualifier ====
First round
4	(China) Yao Xinxin	3	5
WC	(China) Zhang Ruien	6	7
(Japan) Ayumi Koshiishi	7^{7}	3	5
5	(Indonesia) Priska Nugroho	6^{2}	6	7

Qualifying competition
WC	(China) Zhang Ruien	3	3
5	(Indonesia) Priska Nugroho	6	6
