= 2025 Jinan Open =

- Date: 6 – 12 October (men); 13 – 18 October (women)
- Edition: 5th (men); 4th (women)
- Category: ATP Challenger 125; WTA 125
- Prize money: $200,000 (men) $115,000 (women)
- Surface: Hard
- Location: Jinan, China

Champions

Men's singles
- (France) Arthur Cazaux

Women's singles
- (Indonesia) Janice Tjen

Men's doubles
- (New Zealand) Finn Reynolds / (New Zealand) James Watt

Women's doubles
- Elena Pridankina / Ekaterina Reyngold
- Jinan Open

The 2025 Jinan Open was a professional tennis tournament played on outdoor hard courts. It was the fifth edition of the tournament for the men which was part of the 2025 ATP Challenger Tour 125 and fourth edition of the tournament for the women which was part of the 2025 WTA 125 tournaments. It took place in Jinan, China between 6 and 12 October 2025 for the men and between 13 and 18 October for the women.

== Men's singles main-draw entrants ==
=== Seeds ===
| Country | Player | Rank^{1} | Seed |
|---|---|---|---|
| FRA | Arthur Cazaux | 70 | 1 |
| AUS | Adam Walton | 77 | 2 |
| SRB | Laslo Djere | 82 | 3 |
| CZE | Dalibor Svrčina | 91 | 4 |
| AUS | Tristan Schoolkate | 96 | 5 |
| USA | Mackenzie McDonald | 99 | 6 |
| JPN | Shintaro Mochizuki | 102 | 7 |
| AUS | James Duckworth | 103 | 8 |

- ^{1} Rankings are as of 29 September 2025.

=== Other entrants ===
The following players received wildcards into the singles main draw:

- (China) Cui Jie
- (China) Sun Fajing
- (China) Zhou Yi

The following player received entry into the singles main draw as an alternate:

- (Australia) James McCabe

The following players received entry from the qualifying draw:

- Petr Bar Biryukov
- (France) Kyrian Jacquet
- Pavel Kotov
- (Thailand) Kasidit Samrej
- (Kazakhstan) Denis Yevseyev
- Maxim Zhukov

== Women's singles main-draw entrants ==
=== Seeds ===
| Country | Player | Rank^{1} | Seed |
|---|---|---|---|
| | Anastasia Zakharova | 83 | 1 |
| HUN | Anna Bondár | 87 | 2 |
| INA | Janice Tjen | 99 | 3 |
| SLO | Veronika Erjavec | 103 | 4 |
| AND | Victoria Jiménez Kasintseva | 110 | 5 |
| NZL | Lulu Sun | 127 | 6 |
| FRA | Tiantsoa Rakotomanga Rajaonah | 130 | 7 |
| USA | Whitney Osuigwe | 141 | 8 |

- ^{1} Rankings are as of 6 October 2025.

=== Other entrants ===
The following players received wildcards into the singles main draw:

- (China) Li Xiaowei
- (China) Ren Yufei
- (China) Shi Han
- (China) Wang Yafan

The following players received entry using protected rankings:

- Darya Astakhova
- (China) Bai Zhuoxuan

The following players received entry from the qualifying draw:

- (Indonesia) Priska Nugroho
- Ekaterina Reyngold
- (China) Tian Fangran
- (Ukraine) Katarina Zavatska

=== Withdrawals ===
Before the tournament

- (Slovakia) Renáta Jamrichová → replaced by (Australia) Arina Rodionova
- (France) Léolia Jeanjean → replaced by (Japan) Haruka Kaji
- (Spain) Nuria Párrizas Díaz → replaced by Polina Iatcenko

== Women's doubles main-draw entrants ==
=== Seeds ===
| Country | Player | Country | Player | Rank^{1} | Seed |
|---|---|---|---|---|---|
| HUN | Anna Bondár | SLO | Veronika Erjavec | 224 | 1 |
| TPE | Cho I-hsuan | TPE | Cho Yi-tsen | 226 | 2 |
| GBR | Maia Lumsden | INA | Janice Tjen | 227 | 3 |
| HKG | Eudice Chong | CHN | Feng Shuo | 239 | 4 |

- ^{1} Rankings as of 6 October 2025.

=== Other entrants ===
The following pair received a wildcard into the doubles main draw:

- (China) Ren Yufei / (China) Shi Han

The following pair received entry using a protected ranking:

- (China) Bai Zhuoxuan / (China) Gao Xinyu

== Champions ==
=== Men's singles ===
- (France) Arthur Cazaux def. (United States) Mackenzie McDonald 6–3, 6–2.

=== Women's singles ===
- (Indonesia) Janice Tjen def. (Hungary) Anna Bondár 6–4, 4–6, 6–4

=== Men's doubles ===
- (New Zealand) Finn Reynolds / (New Zealand) James Watt def. (India) Rithvik Choudary Bollipalli / (India) Arjun Kadhe 7–5, 7–6^{(7–1)}.

=== Women's doubles ===
- Elena Pridankina / Ekaterina Reyngold def. (India) Rutuja Bhosale / (China) Zheng Wushuang 6–1, 6–3
