= 2023 Torneig Internacional Els Gorchs – Singles =

Singles
- 2023 Torneig Internacional Els Gorchs

Final
- Champion: (Poland) Magdalena Fręch
- Runner-up: (Italy) Sara Errani
- Score: 7–5, 4–6, 6–4

Events
Singles	Doubles
- Torneig Internacional Els Gorchs

Jasmine Paolini was the defending champion but chose not to participate.

Magdalena Fręch won the title, defeating Sara Errani in the final, 7–5, 4–6, 6–4.

== Seeds ==
1. (Netherlands) Arantxa Rus (quarterfinals)
2. (Poland) Magdalena Fręch (champion)
3. (Czech Republic) Linda Fruhvirtová (quarterfinals)
4. (Slovenia) Tamara Zidanšek (first round, retired)
5. (Bulgaria) Viktoriya Tomova (semifinals)
6. (Italy) Sara Errani (final)
7. (Spain) Marina Bassols Ribera (second round)
8. (France) Alizé Cornet (first round)

== Draw ==
Key

- Q = Qualifier
- WC = Wild card
- LL = Lucky loser
- Alt = Alternate
- ITF = ITF entry
- PR = Protected ranking
- SR = Special ranking
- SE = Special exempt
- JE = Junior exempt
- JR = Junior Accelerator Programme entrant
- CO = College Accelerator Programme entrant
- NG = Next Gen Accelerator Program entrant
- w/o = Walkover
- r = Retired
- d = Defaulted

=== Finals ===
Semifinals
(Hungary) Dalma Gálfi	4	6	1
6	(Italy) Sara Errani	6	2	6
5	(Bulgaria) Viktoriya Tomova	2	4
2	(Poland) Magdalena Fręch	6	6

Final
6	(Italy) Sara Errani	5	6	4
2	(Poland) Magdalena Fręch	7	4	6

=== Top half ===
First round
1	(Netherlands) A Rus	6	6
WC	(Spain) M Soriano Santiago	1	2
(Italy) C Rosatello	4	4
V Savinykh	6	6
Q	(Spain) P Arias Manjón	1	3
(Hungary) D Gálfi	6	6
WC	(Switzerland) S Bandecchi	3	6	6
8	(France) A Cornet	6	1	4
3	(Czech Republic) L Fruhvirtová	6	6
Q	(Switzerland) S Scilipoti	2	1
WC	(Spain) G Maristany	6	7^{7}
LL	(Germany) S-R Sekulic	3	6^{5}
Q	A Charaeva	6^{1}	6	6^{5}
(Spain) J Bouzas Maneiro	7^{7}	4	7^{7}
(Spain) I Burillo Escorihuela	2	3
6	(Italy) S Errani	6	6

Second round
1	(Netherlands) A Rus	6^{5}	6	6
V Savinykh	7^{7}	3	1
(Hungary) D Gálfi	6	2	6
WC	(Switzerland) S Bandecchi	2	6	2
3	(Czech Republic) L Fruhvirtová	6	6
WC	(Spain) G Maristany	4	2
(Spain) J Bouzas Maneiro	3	1
6	(Italy) S Errani	6	6

Quarterfinals
1	(Netherlands) A Rus	2	4
(Hungary) D Gálfi	6	6
3	(Czech Republic) L Fruhvirtová	4	2
6	(Italy) S Errani	6	6

Semifinals
(Hungary) D Gálfi	4	6	1
6	(Italy) S Errani	6	2	6

=== Bottom half ===
First round
5	(Bulgaria) V Tomova	7	6
Q	E Reyngold	5	1
Q	(Czech Republic) V Bervid	2	3
(Switzerland) J Teichmann	6	6
Q	(France) N Berecoechea	1	6	6
(Greece) D Papamichail	6	2	2
(Malta) F Curmi	6	3
4	(Slovenia) T Zidanšek	4	1^{r}
7	(Spain) M Bassols Ribera	6	4	7
(China) X Gao	3	6	5
(Spain) A Bolsova	6	6^{6}	5
Q	(Israel) L Glushko	3	7^{8}	7
WC	(Spain) A Lázaro García	7^{7}	5	6^{6}
Q	M Bondarenko	6^{5}	7	7^{8}
(Latvia) D Semeņistaja	6	2	0
2	(Poland) M Fręch	4	6	6

Second round
5	(Bulgaria) V Tomova	6	2	6
(Switzerland) J Teichmann	4	6	4
Q	(France) N Berecoechea	7	6
(Malta) F Curmi	5	2
7	(Spain) M Bassols Ribera	4	6	3
Q	(Israel) L Glushko	6	3	6
Q	M Bondarenko	1	2
2	(Poland) M Fręch	6	6

Quarterfinals
5	(Bulgaria) V Tomova	6	6
Q	(France) N Berecoechea	2	4
Q	(Israel) L Glushko	4	0
2	(Poland) M Fręch	6	6

Semifinals
5	(Bulgaria) V Tomova	2	4
2	(Poland) M Fręch	6	6
