= Vrnjačka Banja Open =

- 2022 Vrnjačka Banja Open

ITF Women's Tour
- Event name: Vrnjačka Banja Open
- Location: Vrnjačka Banja, Serbia
- Venue: TK AS NS
- Category: ITF Women's World Tennis Tour
- Surface: Clay / outdoor
- Draw: 32S/32Q/16D
- Prize money: $25,000

The Vrnjačka Banja Open is a tournament for professional female tennis players played on outdoor clay courts. The event is classified as a $25,000 ITF Women's World Tennis Tour tournament and has been held in Vrnjačka Banja, Serbia, since 2013.

In 2022, there were held two tournaments there, a $25k and a $60k edition (won by Aliona Bolsova).

== Past finals ==
=== Singles ===
Year	Champion	Runner-up	Score
2024	(Canada) Carson Branstine	(Serbia) Lola Radivojević	7–6^{(7–5)}, 6–4
2023	(Slovenia) Polona Hercog	(Bulgaria) Isabella Shinikova	6–2, 6–4
2022 (2)	(Spain) Aliona Bolsova	(Slovenia) Nina Potočnik	7–5, 6–1
2022 (1)	(Serbia) Mia Ristić	(Romania) Cristina Dinu	0–6, 7–5, 7–5
2021	(Romania) Cristina Dinu	(Czech Republic) Anna Sisková	6–1, 7–5
2020	tournament cancelled due to the COVID-19 pandemic		
2019	(Croatia) Silvia Njirić	(Romania) Oana Gavrilă	6–0, 6–3
2018	(Serbia) Draginja Vuković	(Russia) Amina Anshba	6–2, 6–4
2017	(Romania) Oana Gavrilă	(Belgium) Marie Benoît	6–7^{(3–7)}, 6–4, 7–5
2016	(Russia) Sofya Golubovskaya	(Serbia) Bojana Marković	6–3, 6–2
2015	(North Macedonia) Lina Gjorcheska	(Slovenia) Nina Potočnik	6–7^{(4–7)}, 6–1, 6–0
2014	(Greece) Valentini Grammatikopoulou	(Bosnia and Herzegovina) Dea Herdželaš	1–6, 6–3, 7–6^{(7–5)}
2013	(Slovakia) Rebecca Šramková	(Serbia) Dunja Stamenković	6–3, 6–2

=== Doubles ===
Year	Champions	Runners-up	Score
2024	(Serbia) Natalija Senić (Serbia) Anja Stanković	(Slovenia) Ela Nala Milić (Italy) Anna Turati	6–3, 6–4
2023	(Serbia) Elena Milovanović (Australia) Ivana Popovic	(Italy) Diletta Cherubini (Finland) Laura Hietaranta	6–4, 6–1
2022 (2)	Darya Astakhova; Ekaterina Reyngold	(Romania) Cristina Dinu (Slovenia) Nika Radišić	3–6, 6–2, [10–8]
2022 (1)	(Romania) Cristina Dinu (Ukraine) Valeriya Strakhova	(United Kingdom) Emily Appleton (India) Prarthana Thombare	6–1, 4–6, [10–8]
2021	(Brazil) Carolina Alves (Venezuela) Andrea Gámiz	(Romania) Ioana Loredana Roșca (Egypt) Sandra Samir	6–4, 6–1
2020	tournament cancelled due to the COVID-19 pandemic		
2019	(Croatia) Mariana Dražić (Lithuania) Justina Mikulskytė	(Czech Republic) Kristýna Hrabalová (Slovakia) Laura Svatíková	6–2, 7–6^{(7–5)}
2018	(Germany) Joëlle Steur (Germany) Julyette Steur	(Russia) Anna Makhorkina (Italy) Miriana Tona	6–2, 6–3
2017	(Romania) Oana Gavrilă (Australia) Jelena Stojanovic	(Russia) Polina Golubovskaya (Russia) Sofya Golubovskaya	7–6^{(7–2)}, 6–3
2016	(Serbia) Tamara Čurović (Slovakia) Sandra Jamrichová	(Serbia) Kristina Ostojić (Bulgaria) Ani Vangelova	6–3, 6–2
2015	(North Macedonia) Lina Gjorcheska (Slovakia) Chantal Škamlová	(Serbia) Marina Lazić (Serbia) Bojana Marinković	6–4, 6–0
2014	(Bosnia and Herzegovina) Dea Herdželaš (Serbia) Nina Stojanović	(Russia) Daria Lodikova (Ukraine) Kateryna Sliusar	6–3, 6–0
2013	(North Macedonia) Lina Gjorcheska (Russia) Polina Leykina	(Slovakia) Rebecca Šramková (Slovakia) Natália Vajdová	6–4, 6–3
