= 2025 Jinan Open – Women's doubles =

Women's doubles
- 2025 Jinan Open

Final
- Champions: Elena Pridankina; Ekaterina Reyngold
- Runners-up: (India) Rutuja Bhosale (China) Zheng Wushuang
- Score: 6–1, 6–3

Details
- Draw: 16 (1WC)
- Seeds: 4

Events
Singles	men	women
Doubles	men	women
- Jinan Open

Elena Pridankina and Ekaterina Reyngold won the women's doubles title at the 2025 Jinan Open, defeating Rutuja Bhosale and Zheng Wushuang in the final, 6–1, 6–3.

Guo Meiqi and Xiao Zhenghua were the reigning champions, but did not participate this year.

== Seeds ==
1. (Hungary) Anna Bondár / (Slovenia) Veronika Erjavec (first round)
2. (Chinese Taipei) Cho I-hsuan / (Chinese Taipei) Cho Yi-tsen (quarterfinals)
3. (United Kingdom) Maia Lumsden / (Indonesia) Janice Tjen (first round)
4. (Hong Kong) Eudice Chong / (China) Feng Shuo (semifinals)

== Draw ==
Key

- Q = Qualifier
- WC = Wild card
- LL = Lucky loser
- Alt = Alternate
- ITF = ITF entry
- PR = Protected ranking
- SR = Special ranking
- SE = Special exempt
- JE = Junior exempt
- JR = Junior Accelerator Programme entrant
- CO = College Accelerator Programme entrant
- NG = Next Gen Accelerator Program entrant
- w/o = Walkover
- r = Retired
- d = Defaulted

=== Draw ===
First round
1	(Hungary) A Bondár (Slovenia) V Erjavec	3	4
(Netherlands) A Hartono (India) P Thombare	6	6
A Korneeva (France) T Rakotomanga Rajaonah	0	4
E Pridankina; E Reyngold	6	6
3	(United Kingdom) M Lumsden (Indonesia) J Tjen	6	1	[9]
(United Kingdom) A Barnett (France) E Lechemia	2	6	[11]
(Japan) H Kuwata (Indonesia) P Nugroho	7^{8}	1	[10]
(India) R Bhatia (India) A Raina	6^{6}	6	[2]
(Chinese Taipei) Y-y Li (China) Z Li	7^{7}	6
(Thailand) P Plipuech (China) Q Ye	6^{5}	2
PR	(China) Z Bai (China) X Gao	3	3
4	(Hong Kong) E Chong (China) S Feng	6	6
(India) R Bhosale (China) W Zheng	6	7
(Andorra) V Jiménez Kasintseva (United States) W Osuigwe	1	5
WC	(China) Y Ren (China) H Shi	2	2
2	(Chinese Taipei) I-h Cho (Chinese Taipei) Y-t Cho	6	6

Quarterfinals
(Netherlands) A Hartono (India) P Thombare	4	7	[4]
E Pridankina; E Reyngold	6	5	[10]
(United Kingdom) A Barnett (France) E Lechemia	6	7
(Japan) H Kuwata (Indonesia) P Nugroho	0	5
(Chinese Taipei) Y-y Li (China) Z Li	3	2
4	(Hong Kong) E Chong (China) S Feng	6	6
(India) R Bhosale (China) W Zheng	5	6	[10]
2	(Chinese Taipei) I-h Cho (Chinese Taipei) Y-t Cho	7	4	[6]

Semifinals
E Pridankina; E Reyngold	6	6
(United Kingdom) A Barnett (France) E Lechemia	4	3
4	(Hong Kong) E Chong (China) S Feng	4	6	[6]
(India) R Bhosale (China) W Zheng	6	0	[10]

Final
E Pridankina; E Reyngold	6	6
(India) R Bhosale (China) W Zheng	1	3
