= Torneig Internacional Els Gorchs =

- 2025 Torneig Internacional Els Gorchs

ITF Women's Tour
- Event name: Torneig Internacional Els Gorchs
- Location: Les Franqueses del Vallès, Spain
- Venue: Club de Tennis Els Gorchs
- Category: ITF Women's Circuit
- Surface: Hard
- Draw: 32S/24Q/16D
- Prize money: $100,000
- Website: www.elsgorchs.com

The Torneig Internacional Els Gorchs is a tournament for professional female tennis players played on outdoor hardcourts. The event is now classified as a $100,000 (2019: $60k, 2018: $25k; 2005–2013: $10k) ITF Women's Circuit tournament and has been held in Les Franqueses del Vallès, Spain, since 2005.

== Past finals ==
=== Singles ===
Year	Champion	Runner-up	Score
2025	(Latvia) Darja Semeņistaja	(Poland) Linda Klimovičová	7–5, 7–6^{(7–4)}
2024	Anastasia Zakharova	Alina Charaeva	6–3, 6–1
2023	(Poland) Magdalena Fręch	(Italy) Sara Errani	7–5, 4–6, 6–4
2022	(Italy) Jasmine Paolini	(Ukraine) Kateryna Baindl	6–4, 6–4
2021	(Belgium) Maryna Zanevska	(Switzerland) Ylena In-Albon	7–6^{(7–5)}, 6–4
2020	tournament cancelled due to the COVID-19 pandemic		
2019	(United Kingdom) Katy Dunne	(Spain) Paula Badosa	7–5, 6–3
2018	(Spain) Paula Badosa	(Russia) Margarita Gasparyan	6–4, 3–6, 6–2
2014–17	not held		
2013	(France) Océane Dodin	(Switzerland) Tess Sugnaux	6–3, 6–3
2012	(Belarus) Ksenia Milevskaya	(Belarus) Anastasia Yakimova	7–5, 6–7^{(5–7)}, 6–4
2010–11	not held		
2009	(France) Irina Ramialison	(France) Cindy Chala	3–6, 6–4, 6–4
2008	(Germany) Justine Ozga	(United States) Kristi Miller	4–6, 6–3, 7–6^{(7–3)}
2007	(Spain) Cynthia Prieto García	(Germany) Antonia Matic	2–6, 6–4, 7–6^{(7–5)}
2006	(India) Sandhya Nagaraj	(Turkey) İpek Şenoğlu	6–4, 6–2
2005	(Spain) Estrella Cabeza Candela	(Germany) Justine Ozga	7–6^{(7–3)}, 4–6, 6–2

=== Doubles ===
Year	Champions	Runners-up	Score
2025	(Slovenia) Dalila Jakupović (Slovenia) Nika Radišić	(Switzerland) Susan Bandecchi (United Kingdom) Freya Christie	6–4, 2–6, [10–6]
2024	Alina Charaeva; Ekaterina Reyngold	(Germany) Mina Hodzic (Germany) Caroline Werner	6–2, 7–6^{(7–2)}
2023	(Italy) Angelica Moratelli (Italy) Camilla Rosatello	(China) Gao Xinyu (Latvia) Darja Semeņistaja	4–6, 7–5, [10–6]
2022	(Spain) Aliona Bolsova (Spain) Rebeka Masarova	(Japan) Misaki Doi (Indonesia) Beatrice Gumulya	7–5, 1–6, [10–3]
2021	(Russia) Irina Khromacheva (Australia) Arina Rodionova	(Switzerland) Susan Bandecchi (United Kingdom) Eden Silva	2–6, 6–3, [10–6]
2020	tournament cancelled due to the COVID-19 pandemic		
2019	(France) Jessika Ponchet (United Kingdom) Eden Silva	(United Kingdom) Jodie Burrage (United Kingdom) Olivia Nicholls	6–3, 6–4
2018	(Mexico) Giuliana Olmos (Brazil) Laura Pigossi	(Romania) Raluca Șerban (India) Pranjala Yadlapalli	6–4, 6–4
2014–17	not held		
2013	(Netherlands) Dide Beijer (France) Estelle Cascino	(Sweden) Cornelia Lister (Italy) Sara Sussarello	6–4, 6–7^{(0–7)}, [10–6]
2012	(Germany) Carolin Daniels (Russia) Eugeniya Pashkova	(India) Sharmada Balu (China) He Sirui	6–4, 6–3
2010–11	not held		
2009	(Mexico) Ximena Hermoso (Spain) Garbiñe Muguruza	(Israel) Efrat Mishor (Germany) Anna Zaja	6–2, 6–2
2008	(North Macedonia) Aleksandra Josifoska (Poland) Katarzyna Piter	(Serbia) Bojana Borovnica (Spain) Cristina Sánchez Quintanar	6–3, 2–6, [10–3]
2007	(United States) Daisy Ames (South Africa) Lizaan du Plessis	(Estonia) Gajane Vage (Spain) Maribel Vicente Joyera	6–0, 6–2
2006	(India) Sandhya Nagaraj (Spain) Sheila Solsona Carcasona	(Spain) Nuria Sánchez García (Spain) Astrid Waernes García	6–2, 6–3
2005	(Germany) Hannah Kürvers (Germany) Justine Ozga	(India) Sandhya Nagaraj (Germany) Svenja Weidemann	6–2, 6–2
