= Oana Gavrilă =

Romanian tennis player (born 1998)

- Country (sports): Romania
- Born: 19 April 1998 (age 28) Craiova, Romania
- Height: 1.70 m (5 ft 7 in)
- Turned pro: 2013
- Plays: Right-handed
- Prize money: $132,898

Singles
- Career record: 245–203
- Career titles: 6 ITF
- Highest ranking: No. 442 (9 September 2024)

Doubles
- Career record: 306–153
- Career titles: 37 ITF
- Highest ranking: No. 150 (17 July 2023)
- Current ranking: No. 192 (12 October 2026)
- Last updated on: 15 October 2026.

Oana Gavrilă (born 19 April 1998) is a Romanian tennis player.

Gavrilă has a career-high singles ranking by the WTA of 442, achieved on 9 September 2024. She also has a career-high WTA doubles ranking of 150, achieved on 17 July 2023.

Gavrilă won her first bigger title at the W60 event in Bodrum, Turkey, in the doubles draw, partnering with Isabelle Haverlag.

At the WTA 125 2023 Swedish Open, she gained entry as an alternate losing in the first round to Claire Liu. The following week at the 2023 Iași Open, Gavrilă lost in qualifying but was advanced to the main draw as a lucky loser, only to be defeated by wildcard player Andreea Prisăcariu.

== ITF Circuit finals ==
=== Singles: 12 (6 titles, 6 runner-ups) ===
Legend W35 tournaments W10/15 tournaments	Finals by surface Hard (1–1) Clay (5–5)

Result	W–L	Date	Tournament	Tier	Surface	Opponent	Score
Win	1–0	Dec 2017	ITF Sozopol, Bulgaria	W10	Hard	(Romania) Andreea Roșca	6–3, 6–4
Win	2–0	Jul 2017	ITF Prokuplje, Serbia	W15	Clay	(Serbia) Tamara Čurović	6–4, 6–3
Win	3–0	Aug 2017	Vrnjačka Banja Open, Serbia	W15	Clay	(Belgium) Marie Benoît	6–7^{(3)}, 6–4, 7–5
Loss	3–1	Mar 2019	ITF Tabarka, Tunisia	W15	Clay	(Russia) Daria Lodikova	4–6, 2–6
Win	4–1	Jun 2019	ITF Heraklion, Greece	W15	Clay	(Ukraine) Oleksandra Oliynykova	6–1, 6–3
Loss	4–2	Aug 2019	ITF Tabarka, Tunisia	W15	Clay	(Spain) Ángela Fita Boluda	7–5, 4–6, 4–6
Loss	4–3	Sep 2019	Vrnjačka Banja Open, Serbia	W15	Clay	(Croatia) Silvia Njirić	0–6, 3–6
Win	5–3	Nov 2021	ITF Heraklion, Greece	W15	Clay	(Russia) Anna Ukolova	3–6, 6–3, 6–4
Loss	5–4	Oct 2023	ITF Monastir, Tunisia	W15	Hard	(Poland) Gina Feistel	1–6, 4–6
Win	6–4	Mar 2024	ITF Campinas, Brazil	W15	Clay	(Russia) Ekaterina Makarova	6–2, 3–6, 6–1
Loss	6–5	May 2024	ITF Kranjska Gora, Slovenia	W15	Clay	(Czech Republic) Laura Samson	1–6, 4–6
Loss	6–6	Aug 2024	ITF Brașov, Romania	W35	Clay	(Slovakia) Nina Vargová	0–6, 6–7^{(5)}

=== Doubles: 55 (37 titles, 18 runner-ups) ===
Legend W60/75 tournaments W40/50 tournaments W25/35 tournaments W10/15 tournaments	Finals by surface Hard (8–5) Clay (29–13)

Result	W–L	Date	Tournament	Tier	Surface	Partner	Opponents	Score
Win	1–0	Oct 2016	ITF Sozopol, Bulgaria	W10	Hard	(Romania) Andreea Roșca	(Czech Republic) Kateřina Kramperová (Russia) Angelina Zhuravleva	6–4, 6–3
Loss	1–1	Dec 2016	ITF Hammamet, Tunisia	W10	Hard	(Slovakia) Sandra Jamrichová	(Brazil) Carolina Alves (Serbia) Tamara Čurović	1–6, 6–3, [8–10]
Loss	1–2	Dec 2016	ITF Hammamet, Tunisia	W10	Hard	(Slovakia) Sandra Jamrichová	(Brazil) Carolina Alves (Serbia) Tamara Čurović	3–6, 2–6
Win	2–2	Jul 2017	ITF Focșani, Romania	W15	Clay	(Russia) Ekaterina Kazionova	(Italy) Martina Colmegna (Romania) Camelia Hristea	6–2, 6–1
Loss	2–3	Jul 2017	ITF Târgu Jiu, Romania	W15	Clay	(India) Riya Bhatia	(Australia) Samantha Harris (Australia) Belinda Woolcock	3–6, 2–6
Win	3–3	Aug 2017	Vrnjačka Banja Open, Serbia	W15	Clay	(Australia) Jelena Stojanovic	(Russia) Polina Golubovskaya (Russia) Sofya Golubovskaya	7–6^{(2)}, 6–3
Loss	3–4	Nov 2017	ITF Heraklion, Greece	W15	Clay	(Romania) Gabriela Duca	(Germany) Tayisiya Morderger (Germany) Yana Morderger	4–6, 6–3, [8–10]
Win	4–4	Jan 2018	ITF Antalya, Turkey	W15	Clay	(Romania) Andreea Roșca	(Turkey) İpek Öz (Russia) Ekaterina Vishnevskaya	6–4, 6–2
Win	5–4	Mar 2018	ITF Hammamet, Tunisia	W15	Clay	(Brazil) Laura Pigossi	(Austria) Melanie Klaffner (Romania) Oana Georgeta Simion	7–5, 6–7^{(6)}, [11–9]
Loss	5–5	Apr 2018	ITF Hammamet, Tunisia	W15	Clay	(Ukraine) Maryna Chernyshova	(Russia) Amina Anshba (Russia) Maria Marfutina	6–4, 2–6, [10–12]
Win	6–5	Apr 2018	ITF Hammamet, Tunisia	W15	Clay	(Russia) Maria Marfutina	(Japan) Mana Ayukawa (Switzerland) Nina Stadler	6–2, 6–2
Win	7–5	Nov 2018	ITF Heraklion, Greece	W15	Clay	(Israel) Maya Tahan	(Poland) Anna Hertel (Switzerland) Xenia Knoll	6–3, 1–6, [10–3]
Loss	7–6	Dec 2018	ITF Cairo, Egypt	W15	Clay	(Romania) Gabriela Tătăruș	(Romania) Selma Ștefania Cadar (Slovenia) Nika Radišić	3–6, 6–0, [12–14]
Win	8–6	Mar 2019	ITF Tabarka, Tunisia	W15	Clay	(Italy) Martina Spigarelli	(Romania) Oana Georgeta Simion (Slovakia) Chantal Škamlová	7–5, 3–6, [10–8]
Win	9–6	Jun 2019	ITF Heraklion, Greece	W15	Clay	(Romania) Gabriela Tătăruș	(Greece) Anna Arkadianou (Greece) Adreanna Christopoulou	2–6, 6–4, [10–5]
Win	10–6	Jul 2019	ITF Bucharest, Romania	W15	Clay	(Romania) Oana Smaranda Corneanu	(Czech Republic) Kristýna Hrabalová (Czech Republic) Barbora Miklová	5–7, 6–4, [10–4]
Win	11–6	Aug 2019	ITF Tabarka, Tunisia	W15	Clay	(Spain) Ángela Fita Boluda	(Serbia) Elena Milovanović (Italy) Anna Turati	6–3, 4–6, [10–5]
Win	12–6	Sep 2019	ITF Curtea de Argeș, Romania	W15	Clay	(Romania) Oana Smaranda Corneanu	(Romania) Oana Georgeta Simion (Romania) Arina Vasilescu	7–6^{(6)}, 4–6, [10–8]
Win	13–6	Sep 2019	ITF Focșani, Romania	W15	Clay	(Romania) Andreea Roșca	(Romania) Andreea Mitu (Romania) Gabriela Tătăruș	1–6, 6–2, [10–4]
Loss	13–7	Sep 2019	ITF Arad, Romania	W25	Clay	(Romania) Andreea Roșca	(Romania) Andreea Mitu (Turkey) Başak Eraydın	0–6, 1–6
Loss	13–8	Nov 2019	ITF Heraklion, Greece	W15	Clay	(Bolivia) Noelia Zeballos	(Armenia) Ani Amiraghyan (Bulgaria) Julia Stamatova	1–6, 6–4, [7–10]
Win	14–8	Feb 2020	ITF Heraklion, Greece	W15	Clay	(Romania) Andreea Roșca	(Czech Republic) Miriam Kolodziejová (Slovakia) Chantal Škamlová	6–3, 4–6, [10–7]
Loss	14–9	Sep 2020	ITF Varna, Bulgaria	W15	Clay	(Romania) Andreea Roșca	(Romania) Cristina Dinu (Romania) Ioana Loredana Roșca	4–6, 6–3, [7–10]
Win	15–9	Nov 2020	ITF Pazardzhik, Bulgaria	W15	Clay	(Romania) Oana Georgeta Simion	(Bulgaria) Katerina Dimitrova (United States) Isabelle Kouzmanov	6–7^{(1)}, 6–4, [10–4]
Win	16–9	Mar 2021	ITF Monastir, Tunisia	W15	Hard	(Romania) Ilona Georgiana Ghioroaie	(United Kingdom) Anna Popescu (United States) Chiara Scholl	7–5, 6–4
Loss	16–10	May 2021	ITF Cairo, Egypt	W15	Clay	(Russia) Elina Avanesyan	(Italy) Nicole Fossa Huergo (Kazakhstan) Zhibek Kulambayeva	3–6, 2–6
Win	17–10	May 2021	ITF Cairo, Egypt	W15	Clay	(Kazakhstan) Zhibek Kulambayeva	(Egypt) Yasmin Ezzat (United States) Clervie Ngounoue	6–4, 6–0
Win	18–10	Sep 2021	ITF Varna, Bulgaria	W15	Clay	(Romania) Georgia Crăciun	(Italy) Chiara Catini (Russia) Victoria Mikhaylova	4–6, 7–6^{(6)}, [10–2]
Win	19–10	Oct 2021	ITF Sozopol, Bulgaria	W15	Hard	(Bulgaria) Katerina Dimitrova	(Bulgaria) Julia Terziyska (Bulgaria) Gergana Topalova	3–6, 6–4, [10–1]
Win	20–10	Oct 2021	ITF Sozopol, Bulgaria	W15	Hard	(Germany) Emily Seibold	(Slovenia) Nastja Kolar (Bulgaria) Ani Vangelova	6–0, 6–2
Win	21–10	Dec 2021	ITF Antalya, Turkey	W15	Clay	(Romania) Arina Vasilescu	(Russia) Ksenia Laskutova (Hungary) Amarissa Tóth	1–6, 6–4, [12–10]
Win	22–10	Nov 2022	ITF Heraklion, Greece	W25	Clay	(Bulgaria) Lia Karatancheva	(North Macedonia) Lina Gjorcheska (Bosnia and Herzegovina) Dea Herdželaš	6–4, 6–4
Win	23–10	Nov 2022	ITF Heraklion, Greece	W25	Clay	(Russia) Ekaterina Makarova	(Bulgaria) Denislava Glushkova (Ukraine) Anastasiya Soboleva	6–1, 6–3
Loss	23–11	Dec 2022	ITF Monastir, Tunisia	W15	Hard	(United Kingdom) Emilie Lindh	(Chinese Taipei) Tsao Chia-yi (Chinese Taipei) Wu Fang-hsien	4–6, 3–6
Win	24–11	Dec 2022	ITF Monastir, Tunisia	W25	Hard	(Greece) Sapfo Sakellaridi	(Italy) Diletta Cherubini (Denmark) Olga Helmi	6–1, 6–1
Loss	24–12	Jan 2023	ITF Monastir, Tunisia	W40	Hard	(Greece) Sapfo Sakellaridi	(Russia) Alena Fomina-Klotz (Belarus) Iryna Shymanovich	2–6, 1–6
Win	25–12	Jan 2023	ITF Monastir, Tunisia	W25	Hard	(Greece) Sapfo Sakellaridi	(Japan) Miho Kuramochi (Chinese Taipei) Tsao Chia-yi	7–5, 4–6, [10–6]
Win	26–12	May 2023	ITF Pula, Italia	W25	Hard	(Greece) Sapfo Sakellaridi	(Netherlands) Lexie Stevens (Bosnia and Herzegovina) Anita Wagner	6–1, 6–1
Win	27–12	May 2023	ITF Bodrum, Turkey	W60	Clay	(Netherlands) Isabelle Haverlag	(Turkey) Ayla Aksu (United Kingdom) Harriet Dart	6–4, 7–6^{(3)}
Loss	27–13	Jun 2023	Roma Cup, Italy	W60	Clay	(Greece) Sapfo Sakellaridi	(Italy) Angelica Moratelli (Italy) Camilla Rosatello	6–3, 0–6, [7–10]
Win	28–13	Sep 2023	ITF Slobozia, Romania	W25	Hard	(Ukraine) Valeriya Strakhova	(Romania) Ilona Georgiana Ghioroaie (Romania) Andreea Prisăcariu	6–2, 7–5
Loss	28–14	Oct 2023	ITF Heraklion, Greece	W40	Clay	(Greece) Sapfo Sakellaridi	(Romania) Irina Bara (Slovenia) Dalila Jakupović	6–3, 6–7^{(6)}, [8–10]
Loss	28–15	Nov 2023	ITF Heraklion, Greece	W40	Clay	(Greece) Sapfo Sakellaridi	(Belgium) Lara Salden (Latvia) Daniela Vismane	4–6, 3–6
Loss	28–16	Jan 2024	ITF Monastir, Tunisia	W35	Hard	(France) Yasmine Mansouri	(Belgium) Ema Kovacevic (Belgium) Lara Salden	6–3, 1–6, [8–10]
Win	29–16	Feb 2024	ITF Hammamet, Tunisia	W35	Clay	(Greece) Sapfo Sakellaridi	Amina Anshba (Germany) Katharina Hobgarski	6–7^{(5)}, 7–5, [10–4]
Win	30–16	Feb 2024	ITF Hammamet, Tunisia	W35	Clay	(Greece) Sapfo Sakellaridi	(France) Emma Léné (France) Astrid Lew Yan Foon	6–1, 6–3
Loss	30–17	Jul 2024	ITF Køge, Denmark	W35	Clay	(United States) Haley Giavara	(Czech Republic) Denisa Hindová (Czech Republic) Karolína Kubáňová	3–6, 2–6
Win	31–17	Aug 2024	ITF Cluj-Napoca, Romania	W35	Clay	(Switzerland) Jenny Dürst	(Romania) Briana Szabó (Romania) Patricia Maria Țig	6–1, 6–0
Win	32–17	Jul 2025	ITF Cluj-Napoca, Romania	W15	Clay	(Czech Republic) Linda Ševčíková	(Romania) Lavinia Tănăsie (Romania) Patricia Maria Țig	walkover
Win	33–17	Sep 2025	ITF Bucharest, Romania	W75	Clay	(Greece) Sapfo Sakellaridi	(Romania) Mara Gae (Netherlands) Arantxa Rus	6–4, 6–2
Win	34–17	Jun 2026	Internationaux de Blois, France	W75	Clay	(Greece) Sapfo Sakellaridi	(Ukraine) Anastasiia Firman (Italy) Isabella Șerban	6–4, 6–2
Loss	34–18	Aug 2026	ITF Bytom, Poland	W75	Clay	(Greece) Sapfo Sakellaridi	(China) Feng Shuo (China) Li Zongyu	4–6, 2–6
Win	35–18	Sep 2026	Pazardzhik Cup, Bulgaria	W50	Clay	(Greece) Sapfo Sakellaridi	(United States) Julia Adams (Netherlands) Merel Hoedt	6–4, 6–4
Win	36–18	Sep 2026	ITF Plovdiv, Bulgaria	W50	Clay	(Greece) Sapfo Sakellaridi	(Sweden) Caijsa Hennemann (Sweden) Nellie Taraba Wallberg	6–0, 7–6^{(2)}
Win	37–18	Nov 2026	ITF Heraklion, Greece	W35	Clay (i)	(Greece) Sapfo Sakellaridi	(Greece) Marianna Argyrokastriti (Spain) Lucía Cortez Llorca	2–6, 6–4, [10–7]
