= Linda Klimovičová =

Czech tennis player (born 2004)

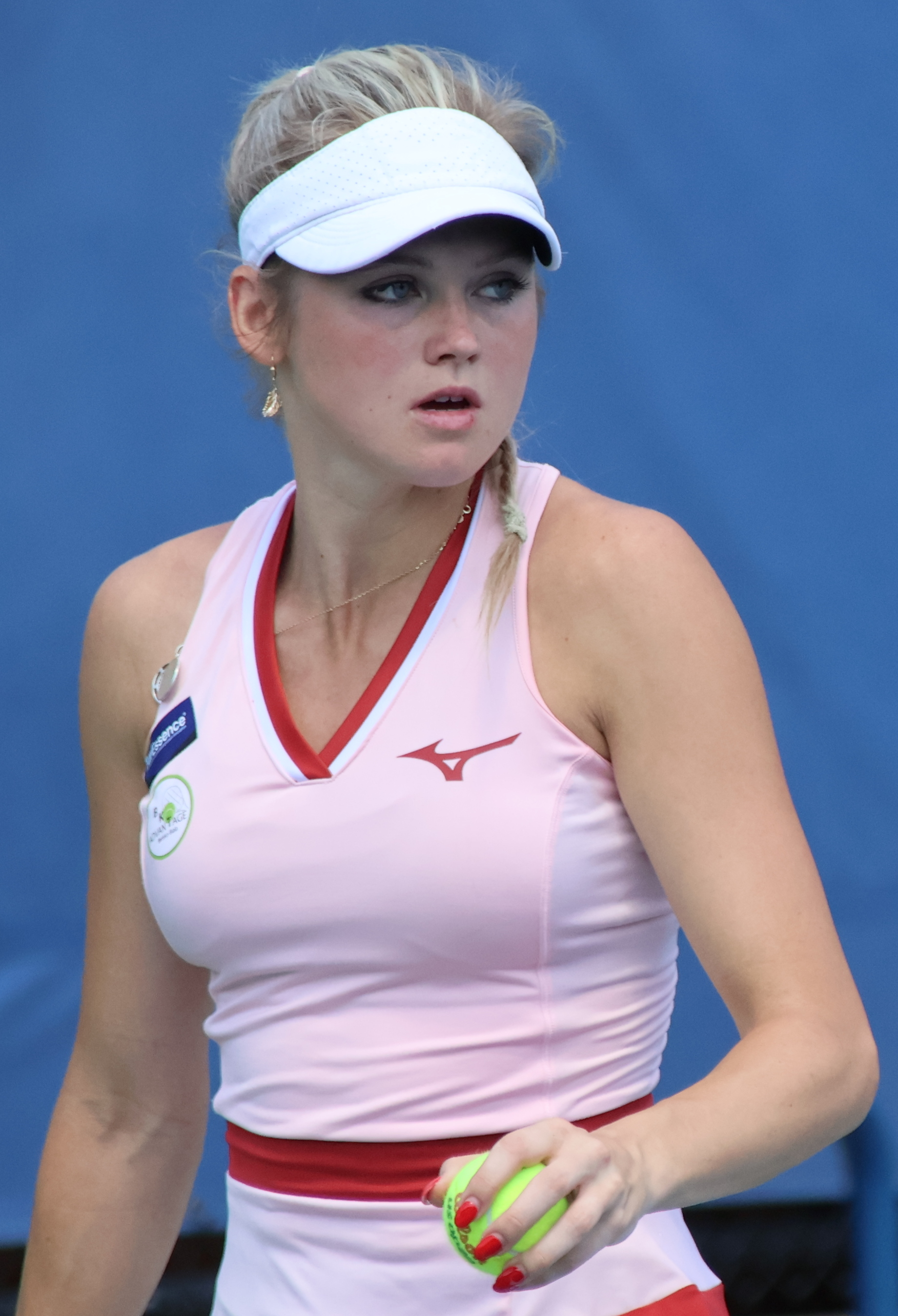
- Klimovičová at the 2026 US Open
- Country (sports): Czech Republic (2018–2024); Poland (2024–)
- Born: 18 June 2004 (age 22) Olomouc, Czech Republic
- Plays: Right-handed
- Prize money: $490,323

Singles
- Career record: 174–94
- Career titles: 7 ITF
- Highest ranking: No. 129 (9 February 2026)
- Current ranking: No. 261 (23 November 2026)

Grand Slam singles results
- Australian Open: 2R (2026)
- French Open: Q3 (2025)
- Wimbledon: Q1 (2025, 2026)
- US Open: Q3 (2025)

Doubles
- Career record: 31–14
- Career titles: 4 ITF
- Highest ranking: No. 407 (5 August 2024)
- Last updated on: 26 November 2026.

Linda Klimovičová (born 18 June 2004) is a Czech-born Polish tennis player. She achieved her career-high singles ranking of world No. 129 on 9 February 2026. She owns seven singles titles and four doubles titles on the ITF World Tour.

Klimovičová reached a career-high combined junior ranking of No. 31 on 25 October 2021.

== Nationality representation ==
On 19 October 2024, she obtained Polish citizenship, and it was announced that she would represent Poland.

== Career ==
=== Juniors ===
At the 2022 Wimbledon Championships, she reached the semifinals of the girls' singles event as her best junior Grand Slam performance.

==== Grand Slam performance ====
- Singles:

- Australian Open: –
- French Open: 1R (2022)
- Wimbledon: SF (2022)
- US Open: 1R (2021)

- Doubles:

- Australian Open: –
- French Open: 2R (2022)
- Wimbledon: QF (2022)
- US Open: 2R (2021)

=== 2021: WTA Tour debut ===
Klimovičová made her WTA Tour main-draw debut at the 2021 Prague Open, having received a wildcard into the doubles tournament.

=== 2022-2023: First ITF Tour titles ===
In April 2022, she won her first ITF Women's Circuit doubles title at Sharm El Sheikh, alongside fellow Czech player Dominika Šalková. Later, in August 2022, she reached her first singles final at Bydgoszcz but lost to Valeriia Olianovskaia.

In February 2023, Klimovičová won her first ITF Circuit title at Sharm El Sheikh, defeating Katarína Kužmová in the final. In September in Frýdek-Místek, she won her first $25k doubles title. Two months later, she won her first $25k singles title at the Solarino event, where she also triumphed in doubles, partnering with Julie Štruplová.

=== 2025: BJK Cup debut ===
Klimovičová reached her first WTA 125 semifinal at the Samsun Open, losing to second seed and eventual champion, Kaja Juvan, in three sets.

She made her debut for the Poland Billie Jean King Cup team in their play-off match against New Zealand, partnering with Martyna Kubka to defeat Jade Otway and Erin Routliffe in the doubles.

=== 2026: Major singles debut ===
Klimovičová made her debut at the 2026 Australian Open where she qualified for the main draw. She won the first set of her opening match against Francesca Jones who subsequently retired due to injury. Klimovičová lost in the second round to 12th seed Elina Svitolina.

== Performance timeline ==
Key
W	F	SF	QF	#R	RR	Q#	DNQ	A	NH

(W) winner; (F) finalist; (SF) semifinalist; (QF) quarterfinalist; (#R) rounds 4, 3, 2, 1; (RR) round-robin stage; (Q#) qualification round; (DNQ) did not qualify; (A) absent; (NH) not held; (SR) strike rate (events won / competed); (W–L) win–loss record.
To avoid confusion and double counting, these charts are updated at the conclusion of a tournament or when the player's participation has ended.

Only main-draw results in WTA Tour, Grand Slam tournaments, Fed Cup/Billie Jean King Cup and Olympic Games are included in win–loss records.

=== Singles ===
Tournament	2024	2025	2026	W–L
Grand Slam tournaments
Australian Open	A	A	2R	1–1
French Open	A	Q3	Q1	0–0
Wimbledon	A	Q1	Q1	0–0
US Open	Q1	Q3	Q2	0–0
Win–loss	0–0	0–0	1–1	1–1

== ITF Circuit finals ==
=== Singles: 15 (7 titles, 8 runner-ups) ===
Legend W100 tournaments (0–1) W75 tournaments (1–1) W50 tournaments (2–2) W25/35 tournaments (3–3) W15 tournaments (1–1)	Finals by surface Hard (4–6) Clay (0–2) Carpet (3–0)

Result	W–L	Date	Tournament	Tier	Surface	Opponent	Score
Loss	0–1	Aug 2022	ITF Bydgoszcz, Poland	W15	Clay	(Poland) Valeriia Olianovskaia	3–6, 1–6
Win	1–1	Feb 2023	ITF Sharm El Sheikh, Egypt	W15	Hard	(Slovakia) Katarína Kužmová	7–5, 6–7^{(3–7)}, 6–2
Loss	1–2	Oct 2023	ITF Sharm El Sheikh, Egypt	W25	Hard	(Greece) Valentini Grammatikopoulou	6–7^{(1–7)}, 5–7
Win	2–2	Nov 2023	ITF Solarino, Italy	W25	Carpet	(United Kingdom) Emilie Lindh	6–3, 6–7^{(5–7)}, 6–1
Win	3–2	Nov 2023	ITF Solarino, Italy	W25	Carpet	(Italy) Lisa Pigato	6–2, 6–3
Win	4–2	Mar 2024	ITF Solarino, Italy	W35	Carpet	(Italy) Jessica Pieri	6–3, 6–0
Loss	4–3	Apr 2024	ITF Sharm El Sheikh, Egypt	W35	Hard	(Czech Republic) Tereza Valentová	5–7, 2–6
Loss	4–4	May 2024	ITF Monzón, Spain	W35	Clay	(United Kingdom) Sonay Kartal	1–6, 0–6
Win	5–4	Jun 2024	ITF Palma del Río, Spain	W50	Hard	(Switzerland) Leonie Küng	7–5, 6–4
Loss	5–5	Jan 2025	ITF La Marsa, Tunisia	W50	Hard	(Belgium) Hanne Vandewinkel	4–6, 1–6
Win	6–5	Jan 2025	ITF La Marsa, Tunisia	W50	Hard	(Spain) Andrea Lázaro García	6–3, 6–2
Loss	6–6	Mar 2025	Branik Maribor Open, Slovenia	W75	Hard (i)	(Croatia) Antonia Ružić	1–6, 6–4, 3–6
Loss	6–7	Apr 2025	ITF Lopota, Georgia	W50	Hard	(Georgia (country)) Ekaterine Gorgodze	4–6, 5–7
Win	7–7	Jul 2025	Open Araba en Femenino, Spain	W75	Hard	(Lithuania) Justina Mikulskytė	0–6, 7–6^{(7–5)}, 6–0
Loss	7–8	Oct 2025	ITF Les Franqueses del Vallès, Spain	W100	Hard	(Latvia) Darja Semeņistaja	5–7, 6–7^{(4–7)}

=== Doubles: 7 (4 titles, 3 runner-ups) ===
Legend W60 tournaments (0–1) W25/35 tournaments (3–2) W15 tournaments (1–0)	Finals by surface Hard (2–1) Clay (1–1) Carpet (1–1)

Result	W–L	Date	Tournament	Tier	Surface	Partner	Opponents	Score
Loss	0–1	Dec 2021	ITF Jablonec nad Nisou, Czech Republic	W25	Carpet (i)	(Czech Republic) Lucie Havlíčková	(Poland) Maja Chwalińska (Canada) Katherine Sebov	5–7, 4–6
Win	1–1	Apr 2022	ITF Sharm El Sheikh, Egypt	W15	Hard	(Czech Republic) Dominika Šalková	(Japan) Mei Hasegawa (Japan) Saki Imamura	6–1, 6–4
Loss	1–2	Sep 2022	ITF Prague Open, Czech Republic	W60	Clay	(Czech Republic) Dominika Šalková	(France) Elixane Lechemia (Germany) Julia Lohoff	5–7, 5–7
Win	2–2	Sep 2023	ITF Frýdek-Místek, Czech Republic	W25	Clay	(Japan) Mana Kawamura	(Ukraine) Maryna Kolb (Ukraine) Nadiia Kolb	6–1, 6–3
Win	3–2	Nov 2023	ITF Solarino, Italy	W25	Carpet	(Czech Republic) Julie Štruplová	(Italy) Gaia Maduzzi (Italy) Vittoria Paganetti	6–1, 6–7^{(4–7)}, [10–8]
Loss	3–3	Jan 2024	ITF Sharm El Sheikh, Egypt	W35	Hard	(Bulgaria) Isabella Shinikova	Daria Khomutsianskaya (Belarus) Evialina Laskevich	4–6, 2–6
Win	4–3	Feb 2024	ITF Helsinki, Finland	W35	Hard (i)	(Finland) Laura Hietaranta	(Greece) Valentini Grammatikopoulou (Poland) Martyna Kubka	6–3, 6–1

== Junior finals ==
=== ITF Circuit ===
==== Singles: 11 (3 titles, 8 runner-ups) ====
Legend
Grade 1 / B1 (2–1)
Grade 2 (0–2)
Grade 3 (1–2)
Grade 4 (0–3)

Result	W–L	Date	Tournament	Tier	Surface	Opponent	Score
Loss	0–1	Jan 2019	ITF Prague, Czech Republic	Grade 4	Hard	(Czech Republic) Dominika Šalková	2–6, 4–6
Loss	0–2	Jul 2019	ITF Wels, Austria	Grade 4	Clay	(Slovakia) Bianca Behulová	1–6, 2–6
Loss	0–3	Mar 2020	ITF Trnava, Slovakia	Grade 3	Hard	(Slovakia) Radka Zelníčková	4–6, 7–6^{(7–5)}, 4–6
Loss	0–4	Sep 2020	ITF Plzeň, Czech Republic	Grade 2	Clay	(Czech Republic) Tereza Valentová	2–6, 3–6
Loss	0–5	Oct 2020	ITF Véska, Czech Republic	Grade 4	Clay	(Czech Republic) Julie Štruplová	6–2, 6–7^{(6–8)}, 2–6
Win	1–5	Oct 2020	ITF Istanbul, Turkey	Grade 3	Hard	(Serbia) Lola Radivojević	5–7, 6–0, 6–1
Loss	1–6	Oct 2020	ITF Istanbul, Turkey	Grade 3	Hard	(Czech Republic) Brenda Fruhvirtová	2–6, 0–6
Loss	1–7	Feb 2021	ITF Šiauliai, Lithuania	Grade 2	Hard	(Russia) Tatiana Prozorova	3–6, 3–6
Loss	1–8	Jul 2021	ITF Roehampton, UK	Grade 1	Grass	(Czech Republic) Linda Fruhvirtová	6–4, 2–6, 3–6
Win	2–8	Oct 2021	ITF Sanxenxo, Spain	Grade 1	Hard	(Russia) Mirra Andreeva	6–1, 6–2
Win	3–8	Jan 2022	ITF Svyatopetrivske, Ukraine	Grade 1	Hard	(Czech Republic) Kristyna Tomajková	6–2, 3–1 ret.

==== Doubles: 6 (2 titles, 4 runner-ups) ====
Legend
Grade 1 / B1 (0–1)
Grade 2 (2–1)
Grade 3 (0–1)
Grade 4 (0–0)
Grade 5 (0–1)

Result	W–L	Date	Tournament	Tier	Surface	Partner	Opponents	Score
Loss	0–1	Jan 2019	ITF Arlon, Belgium	Grade 5	Carpet	(Czech Republic) Andrea Nova	(Russia) Victoria Borodulina (Croatia) Tara Würth	2–6, 3–6
Win	1–1	Sep 2020	ITF Plzeň, Czech Republic	Grade 2	Clay	(Czech Republic) Dominika Šalková	(Switzerland) Alina Granwehr (Germany) Laura Isabel Pütz	6–4, 6–3
Loss	1–2	Oct 2020	ITF Istanbul, Turkey	Grade 3	Hard	(Serbia) Lola Radivojević	(Russia) Anastasiia Gureva (Russia) Elena Pridankina	1–6, 3–6
Loss	1–3	May 2021	ITF Oberpullendorf, Austria	Grade 2	Clay	(Czech Republic) Brenda Fruhvirtová	(France) Anaelle Leclercq (Japan) Erika Matsuda	3–6, 1–6
Win	2–3	May 2021	ITF Tribuswinkel, Austria	Grade 2	Clay	(Czech Republic) Lucie Havlíčková	(Belgium) Tilwith Di Girolami (Belgium) Amelie Van Impe	6–4, 2–6, [18–16]
Loss	2–4	Oct 2021	ITF Sanxenxo, Spain	Grade 1	Hard	(Romania) Anca Todoni	(Russia) Mirra Andreeva (Belgium) Hanne Vandewinkel	4–6, 3–6
