= Ekaterina Reyngold =

Russian tennis player

Ekaterina Reyngold Екатерина Рейнгольд
- Full name: Ekaterina Albertovna Reyngold
- Country (sports): Russia
- Born: 7 April 2001 (age 25) Saint Petersburg, Russia
- Plays: Right (two-handed backhand)
- Prize money: $138,328

Singles
- Career record: 195–130
- Career titles: 4 ITF
- Highest ranking: No. 226 (26 December 2022)
- Current ranking: No. 405 (15 June 2026)

Grand Slam singles results
- Australian Open: Q1 (2023)

Doubles
- Career record: 139–59
- Career titles: 1 WTA 125, 16 ITF
- Highest ranking: No. 196 (30 January 2023)
- Current ranking: No. 262 (15 June 2026)
- Last updated on: 15 June 2026.

Ekaterina Albertovna Reyngold (Russian:Екатерина Альбертовна Рейнгольд; born 7 April 2001) is a Russian tennis player. She has a career-high singles ranking by the WTA of No. 226, achieved on 26 December 2022, and a best doubles ranking of No. 196, reached on 30 January 2023.

Reyngold has won one WTA 125 doubles title, along with four singles and sixteen doubles titles on the ITF Women's World Tour.

== Career ==
Reyngold made her WTA Tour main-draw debut at the 2022 Morocco Open.

In January 2023, she reached the final of the W40 tournament in Bhopal, India, in the doubles with compatriot Ekaterina Makarova.

In March 2024, partnering with fellow Russian Alina Charaeva, Reyngold won the final of the Wiphold International. The pair beat South Africans Zoë Kruger and Isabella Kruger in three sets. In October, playing again with Charaeva, she won another title at the Torneig Internacional Els Gorchs. The pair faced Germans Mina Hodzic and Caroline Werner in the final and won in straight sets.

Reyngold won her first WTA Challenger title in the doubles tournament of the 2025 Jinan Open. Playing alongside Elena Pridankina, the pair defeated India's Rutuja Bhosale and China's Zheng Wushuang in the final.

== WTA 125 finals ==
=== Doubles: 1 (title) ===
Result	W–L	Date	Tournament	Surface	Partner	Opponents	Score
Win	1–0	Oct 2025	Jinan Open, China	Hard	(Russia) Elena Pridankina	(India) Rutuja Bhosale (China) Zheng Wushuang	6–1, 6–3

== ITF Circuit finals ==
=== Singles: 9 (4 titles, 5 runner-ups) ===
Legend W25/35 tournaments (2–4) W15 tournaments (2–1)	Finals by surface Hard (2–4) Clay (2–1)

Result	W–L	Date	Tournament	Tier	Surface	Opponent	Score
Loss	0–1	Aug 2021	ITF Monastir, Tunisia	W15	Hard	(Japan) Ayumi Koshiishi	7–6 ^{(3)}, 6–7^{(2)}, 1–6
Win	1–1	Jan 2022	ITF Navi Mumbai, India	W25	Hard	(Latvia) Diāna Marcinkēviča	6–3, 6–2
Loss	1–2	Apr 2022	ITF Santa Margherita di Pula, Italy	W25	Clay	(Italy) Camilla Rosatello	3–6, 4–6
Loss	1–3	Nov 2022	ITF Jerusalem, Israel	W25	Hard	Polina Kudermetova	1–6, 1–6
Loss	1–4	Jul 2023	Open Castilla y León, Spain	W25	Hard	Maria Bondarenko	7–6^{(4)}, 0–6, 0–6
Win	2–4	Apr 2025	ITF Antalya, Turkiye	W15	Clay	(Czech Republic) Jana Kovačková	6–2, 6–2
Win	3–4	May 2025	ITF Changwon, South Korea	W35	Hard	(China) Zheng Wushuang	4–6, 7–5, 7–6^{(2)}
Win	4–4	Jul 2025	ITF Casablanca, Morocco	W15	Clay	(Italy) Jennifer Ruggeri	6–2, 6–3
Loss	4–5	Oct 2025	ITF Qiandaohu, China	W35	Hard	(Ukraine) Katarina Zavatska	5–7, 6–3, 2–6

=== Doubles: 24 (16 titles, 8 runner-ups) ===
Legend W100 tournaments (1–0) W60/75 tournaments (1–1) W40/50 tournaments (2–1) W25/35 tournaments (7–3) W15 tournaments (5–3)	Finals by surface Hard (11–3) Clay (5–4) Carpet (0–1)

Result	W–L	Date	Tournament	Tier	Surface	Partner	Opponents	Score
Loss	0–1	Nov 2018	ITF Solarino, Italy	W15	Carpet	(Russia) Iuliia Sokolovskaia	(Argentina) Catalina Pella (Italy) Miriana Tona	4–6, 2–6
Loss	0–2	May 2021	ITF Shymkent, Kazakhstan	W15	Clay	(Russia) Ekaterina Shalimova	(Poland) Martyna Kubka (Kazakhstan) Zhibek Kulambayeva	6–7^{(3)}, 7–5, [8–10]
Loss	0–3	Jun 2021	ITF Shymkent, Kazakhstan	W15	Clay	(Russia) Ekaterina Shalimova	(Poland) Martyna Kubka (Kazakhstan) Zhibek Kulambayeva	4–6, 4–6
Win	1–3	Aug 2021	ITF Monastir, Tunisia	W15	Hard	(Argentina) Jazmin Ortenzi	(Italy) Asya Colombo (Italy) Beatrice Stagno	6–1, 6–1
Win	2–3	Sep 2021	ITF Sozopol, Bulgaria	W15	Hard	(Slovakia) Katarína Kužmová	(Bulgaria) Katerina Dimitrova (Romania) Vanessa Popa Teiușanu	6–1, 6–4
Win	3–3	Sep 2021	ITF Monastir, Tunisia	W15	Hard	(China) Ma Yexin	(France) Yasmine Mansouri (Japan) Himari Sato	6–2, 6–2
Win	4–3	Oct 2021	ITF Monastir, Tunisia	W15	Hard	(France) Yasmine Mansouri	(Japan) Honoka Kobayashi (China) Ma Yexin	6–1, 6–3
Win	5–3	Oct 2021	ITF Karaganda, Kazakhstan	W25	Hard	(Serbia) Tamara Čurović	(Russia) Ekaterina Kazionova (Russia) Ekaterina Makarova	2–6, 6–3, [10–7]
Win	6–3	Nov 2021	ITF Kazan, Russia	W15	Hard	(Uzbekistan) Nigina Abduraimova	(Russia) Ekaterina Maklakova (Russia) Aleksandra Pospelova	6–2, 6–7^{(8)}, [12–10]
Win	7–3	Apr 2022	ITF Pula, Italy	W25	Clay	(Russia) Darya Astakhova	(Italy) Anna Turati (Italy) Bianca Turati	7–6^{(6)}, 6–4
Win	8–3	Jul 2022	ITF Horb, Germany	W25	Clay	(Russia) Ekaterina Makarova	(Australia) Jaimee Fourlis (Australia) Alana Parnaby	2–6, 6–4, [10–8]
Win	9–3	Sep 2022	Vrnjačka Banja Open, Serbia	W60	Clay	(Russia) Darya Astakhova	(Romania) Cristina Dinu (Slovenia) Nika Radišić	3–6, 6–2, [10–8]
Loss	9–4	Nov 2022	ITF Jerusalem, Israel	W25	Hard	(Russia) Polina Kudermetova	(Chinese Taipei) Lee Pei-chi (Georgia (country)) Sofia Shapatava	2–6, 4–6
Win	10–4	Nov 2022	ITF Kiryat Motzkin, Israel	W25	Hard	(Poland) Weronika Falkowska	(Netherlands) Jasmijn Gimbrère (Russia) Ekaterina Yashina	4–6, 6–4, [10–4]
Loss	10–5	Jan 2023	ITF Bhopal, India	W40	Hard	(Russia) Ekaterina Makarova	(Japan) Erina Hayashi (Japan) Saki Imamura	3–6, 6–7^{(3)}
Loss	10–6	Apr 2023	ITF Sharm El Sheik, Egypt	W25	Hard	(Russia) Darya Astakhova	(United States) Emina Bektas (Hong Kong) Eudice Chong	2–6, 4–6
Loss	10–7	Jun 2023	ITF Kuršumlijska Banja, Serbia	W25	Clay	(Argentina) Jazmin Ortenzi	(Greece) Valentini Grammatikopoulou (Russia) Sofya Lansere	3–6, 2–6
Win	11–7	Mar 2024	Pretoria International, South Africa	W50	Hard	(Russia) Alina Charaeva	(South Africa) Isabella Kruger (South Africa) Zoe Kruger	6–0, 5–7, [10–3]
Win	12–7	Apr 2024	ITF Hammamet, Tunisia	W35	Clay	(Canada) Carson Branstine	(France) Émeline Dartron (France) Margaux Rouvroy	6–3, 6–0
Loss	12–8	Jun 2024	Internazionali di Brescia, Italy	W75	Clay	(Kazakhstan) Zhibek Kulambayeva	(Spain) Yvonne Cavallé Reimers (Italy) Aurora Zantedeschi	6–3, 5–7, [6–10]
Win	13–8	Oct 2024	ITF Les Franqueses del Vallès, Spain	W100	Hard	(Russia) Alina Charaeva	(Germany) Mina Hodzic (Germany) Caroline Werner	6–2, 7–6^{(2)}
Win	14–8	Mar 2025	ITF Gurugram, India	W35	Hard	(Russia) Ekaterina Makarova	(Russia) Polina Iatcenko (Russia) Mariia Tkacheva	2–6, 6–4, [10–7]
Win	15–8	Jul 2025	ITF Casablanca, Morocco	W35	Clay	(Japan) Yuki Naito	(Netherlands) Jasmijn Gimbrère (Poland) Zuzanna Pawlikowska	6–7^{(5)}, 6–1, [10–3]
Win	16–8	Apr 2026	ITF Batou, China	W50	Clay (i)	(Kazakhstan) Zhibek Kulambayeva	(Italy) Diletta Cherubini (China) Yuan Chengyiyi	6–1, 6–1
