= 2026 ITF Women's World Tennis Tour (January–March) =

The 2026 ITF Women's World Tennis Tour is the 2026 edition of the second-tier tour for women's professional tennis. It is organised by the International Tennis Federation and is a tier below the WTA Tour. The ITF Women's World Tennis Tour includes tournaments in five categories with prize money ranging from $15,000 up to $100,000.

== Key ==
Category
W100 tournaments ($100,000)
W75 tournaments ($60,000)
W50 tournaments ($40,000)
W35 tournaments ($30,000)
W15 tournaments ($15,000)

=== January ===
Week of	Tournament	Winner	Runners-up	Semifinalists	Quarterfinalists
January 5	Nonthaburi, Thailand; Hard; W75; Singles and doubles draws	(Thailand) Mananchaya Sawangkaew; 6–1, 6–4	(Italy) Lisa Pigato	(Japan) Yuki Naito (United Kingdom) Naiktha Bains	(Slovenia) Polona Hercog (India) Sahaja Yamalapalli (Japan) Sakura Hosogi (Japan) Sara Saito
January 5	Nonthaburi, Thailand; Hard; W75; Singles and doubles draws	(Chinese Taipei) Cho I-hsuan (Chinese Taipei) Cho Yi-tsen; 6–4, 6–7^{(3–7)}, [10–6]	(Chinese Taipei) Lee Ya-hsin (Hong Kong) Cody Wong	(Japan) Yuki Naito (United Kingdom) Naiktha Bains	(Slovenia) Polona Hercog (India) Sahaja Yamalapalli (Japan) Sakura Hosogi (Japan) Sara Saito
January 5	Antalya, Turkiye; Clay; W35; Singles and doubles draws	(Romania) Andreea Prisăcariu; 2–6, 7–6^{(8–6)}, 7–6^{(7–4)}	(Spain) Carlota Martínez Círez	Darya Astakhova (Croatia) Lucija Ćirić Bagarić	(Georgia (country)) Sofia Shapatava (Ukraine) Katarina Zavatska (Bulgaria) Denislava Glushkova (Czech Republic) Barbora Michálková
January 5	Antalya, Turkiye; Clay; W35; Singles and doubles draws	(Croatia) Lucija Ćirić Bagarić (Italy) Francesca Pace; 4–6, 6–3, [12–10]	Daria Lodikova; Alexandra Shubladze	Darya Astakhova (Croatia) Lucija Ćirić Bagarić	(Georgia (country)) Sofia Shapatava (Ukraine) Katarina Zavatska (Bulgaria) Denislava Glushkova (Czech Republic) Barbora Michálková
January 5	Nairobi, Kenya; Clay; W35; Singles and doubles draws	(Kenya) Angella Okutoyi; 6–3, 7–6^{(7–3)}	(Italy) Martina Colmegna	(Egypt) Sandra Samir (Hungary) Luca Udvardy	(Bulgaria) Isabella Shinikova (China) Ren Yufei (Poland) Zuzanna Pawlikowska (Serbia) Natalija Senić
January 5	Nairobi, Kenya; Clay; W35; Singles and doubles draws	(Kenya) Angella Okutoyi (Netherlands) Demi Tran; 6–2, 5–7, [10–4]	(France) Alyssa Réguer (China) Ren Yufei	(Egypt) Sandra Samir (Hungary) Luca Udvardy	(Bulgaria) Isabella Shinikova (China) Ren Yufei (Poland) Zuzanna Pawlikowska (Serbia) Natalija Senić
January 5	Cayenne (French Guiana), France; Hard; W15; Singles and doubles draws	(Netherlands) Jasmijn Gimbrère; 6–4, 6–4	(France) Alizé Lim	(Morocco) Yasmine Kabbaj (France) Astrid Cirotte	(France) Nehanda Thomias (France) Audrey Moutama (France) Pauline Payet (Canada) Rita Colyer
January 5	Cayenne (French Guiana), France; Hard; W15; Singles and doubles draws	(France) Astrid Cirotte (France) Alizé Lim; 6–4, 7–6^{(7–4)}	(Morocco) Yasmine Kabbaj (France) Pauline Payet	(Morocco) Yasmine Kabbaj (France) Astrid Cirotte	(France) Nehanda Thomias (France) Audrey Moutama (France) Pauline Payet (Canada) Rita Colyer
January 5	Oslo, Norway; Hard (i); W15; Singles and doubles draws	(Slovakia) Katarína Kužmová; 6–7^{(4–7)}, 6–3, 6–1	(Sweden) Linea Bajraliu	(Finland) Ella Haavisto (Germany) Ann Akasha Ceuca	(Denmark) Rebecca Munk Mortensen (Norway) Emily Sartz-Lunde (Germany) Isabella Angelina Abendroth (United Kingdom) Amelia Rajecki
January 5	Oslo, Norway; Hard (i); W15; Singles and doubles draws	(Slovakia) Katarína Kužmová (United Kingdom) Amelia Rajecki; 6–4, 6–2	(Norway) Matylda Burylo (Germany) Ann Akasha Ceuca	(Finland) Ella Haavisto (Germany) Ann Akasha Ceuca	(Denmark) Rebecca Munk Mortensen (Norway) Emily Sartz-Lunde (Germany) Isabella Angelina Abendroth (United Kingdom) Amelia Rajecki
January 5	Monastir, Tunisia; Hard; W15; Singles and doubles draws	(United States) Carolyn Ansari; 5–7, 6–3, 6–1	Milana Zhabrailova	(Japan) Erika Sema (China) Huang Yujia	(United States) Jamie Loeb (Japan) Yuno Kitahara (China) Mi Lan (France) Yasmine Mansouri
January 5	Monastir, Tunisia; Hard; W15; Singles and doubles draws	(France) Marie Villet; Milana Zhabrailova; 6–2, 6–4	(China) Huang Yujia (China) Zhang Ying	(Japan) Erika Sema (China) Huang Yujia	(United States) Jamie Loeb (Japan) Yuno Kitahara (China) Mi Lan (France) Yasmine Mansouri
January 5	Hurghada, Egypt; Hard; W15; Singles and doubles draws	Daria Egorova; 7–5, 6–1	(Bulgaria) Lidia Encheva	(Ukraine) Daria Yesypchuk (Italy) Noemi Maines	(Germany) Josy Daems (Egypt) Hala Fouad (Germany) Franziska Sziedat (Italy) Camilla Zanolini
January 5	Hurghada, Egypt; Hard; W15; Singles and doubles draws	(Italy) Maddalena Giordano (Germany) Vivien Sandberg; 5–7, 6–3, [10–7]	(Germany) Josy Daems (Ukraine) Daria Yesypchuk	(Ukraine) Daria Yesypchuk (Italy) Noemi Maines	(Germany) Josy Daems (Egypt) Hala Fouad (Germany) Franziska Sziedat (Italy) Camilla Zanolini
January 12	Nonthaburi, Thailand; Hard; W75; Singles and doubles draws	(Italy) Lisa Pigato; 6–4, 6–7^{(6–8)}, 6–2	(Japan) Hiromi Abe	(China) Tian Fangran; Ekaterina Maklakova	(Japan) Natsumi Kawaguchi (Japan) Mei Yamaguchi (Japan) Hayu Kinoshita (Japan) Kyōka Okamura
January 12	Nonthaburi, Thailand; Hard; W75; Singles and doubles draws	(Hong Kong) Eudice Chong (Chinese Taipei) Liang En-shuo; 5–7, 6–1, [10–8]	(Chinese Taipei) Cho I-hsuan (Chinese Taipei) Cho Yi-tsen	(China) Tian Fangran; Ekaterina Maklakova	(Japan) Natsumi Kawaguchi (Japan) Mei Yamaguchi (Japan) Hayu Kinoshita (Japan) Kyōka Okamura
January 12	Manchester, United Kingdom; Hard (i); W50; Singles and doubles draws	(Switzerland) Céline Naef; 4–6, 6–1, 6–4	(Bulgaria) Elizara Yaneva	(France) Océane Dodin (United Kingdom) Mika Stojsavljevic	(Germany) Mona Barthel (Cyprus) Raluca Șerban (Netherlands) Anouck Vrancken Peeters (Canada) Katherine Sebov
January 12	Manchester, United Kingdom; Hard (i); W50; Singles and doubles draws	(United Kingdom) Alicia Dudeney (Estonia) Elena Malõgina; 1–6, 7–6^{(8–6)}, [10–7]	(United Kingdom) Emily Appleton (Poland) Weronika Falkowska	(France) Océane Dodin (United Kingdom) Mika Stojsavljevic	(Germany) Mona Barthel (Cyprus) Raluca Șerban (Netherlands) Anouck Vrancken Peeters (Canada) Katherine Sebov
January 12	Buenos Aires, Argentina; Clay; W50+H; Singles and doubles draws	(Italy) Dalila Spiteri; 7–6^{(7–5)}, 6–3	(Argentina) Victoria Bosio	(Brazil) Carolina Alves (Bulgaria) Gergana Topalova	(Argentina) María Florencia Urrutia (Ecuador) Mell Reasco González (Mexico) Victoria Rodríguez (Argentina) Justina María González Daniele
January 12	Buenos Aires, Argentina; Clay; W50+H; Singles and doubles draws	(Argentina) Luciana Moyano (Ecuador) Camila Romero; 1–6, 7–6^{(7–4)}, [12–10]	(Mexico) María Fernanda Navarro Oliva (United States) Anna Rogers	(Brazil) Carolina Alves (Bulgaria) Gergana Topalova	(Argentina) María Florencia Urrutia (Ecuador) Mell Reasco González (Mexico) Victoria Rodríguez (Argentina) Justina María González Daniele
January 12	Le Lamentin (Martinique), France; Hard; W35; Singles and doubles draws	(United States) Kayla Day; 6–4, 6–2	(France) Jenny Lim	(Israel) Lina Glushko (France) Margaux Rouvroy	(Japan) Mio Mushika (Morocco) Yasmine Kabbaj (Netherlands) Jasmijn Gimbrère (France) Emma Léné
January 12	Le Lamentin (Martinique), France; Hard; W35; Singles and doubles draws	(United States) Kayla Day (United States) Jenna Dean; 6–4, 1–6, [10–7]	(France) Jenny Lim (France) Margaux Rouvroy	(Israel) Lina Glushko (France) Margaux Rouvroy	(Japan) Mio Mushika (Morocco) Yasmine Kabbaj (Netherlands) Jasmijn Gimbrère (France) Emma Léné
January 12	Antalya, Turkiye; Clay; W35; Singles and doubles draws	Darya Astakhova; 6–1, 4–6, 6–4	(Spain) Ángela Fita Boluda	(Hungary) Amarissa Tóth (Armenia) Ani Amiraghyan	(Bulgaria) Denislava Glushkova; Alexandra Shubladze (Slovenia) Dalila Jakupović (Ukraine) Katarina Zavatska
January 12	Antalya, Turkiye; Clay; W35; Singles and doubles draws	Darya Astakhova (Romania) Andreea Prisăcariu; 6–2, 3–6, [10–8]	(Croatia) Lucija Ćirić Bagarić (Hungary) Amarissa Tóth	(Hungary) Amarissa Tóth (Armenia) Ani Amiraghyan	(Bulgaria) Denislava Glushkova; Alexandra Shubladze (Slovenia) Dalila Jakupović (Ukraine) Katarina Zavatska
January 12	Bradenton, United States; Hard; W35; Singles and doubles draws	(Canada) Bianca Andreescu; 6–2, 7–5	(United States) Vivian Wolff	(United States) Lea Ma (United States) Hina Inoue	(Italy) Tatiana Pieri (Japan) Ena Koike (Sweden) Kajsa Rinaldo Persson (China) Xu Shilin
January 12	Bradenton, United States; Hard; W35; Singles and doubles draws	(United States) Carmen Corley (United States) Ivana Corley; 4–6, 6–3, [10–5]	(United States) Jaeda Daniel (United States) Dalayna Hewitt	(United States) Lea Ma (United States) Hina Inoue	(Italy) Tatiana Pieri (Japan) Ena Koike (Sweden) Kajsa Rinaldo Persson (China) Xu Shilin
January 12	Monastir, Tunisia; Hard; W15; Singles and doubles draws	(Italy) Samira De Stefano; 6–4, 6–4	Kristina Dmitruk	(China) Shi Han; Ksenia Zaytseva	Milana Zhabrailova (France) Yasmine Mansouri (France) Sarah Iliev; Daria Khomutsianskaya
January 12	Monastir, Tunisia; Hard; W15; Singles and doubles draws	Kristina Dmitruk; Daria Khomutsianskaya; 7–5, 7–5	(France) Yasmine Mansouri (Serbia) Elena Milovanović	(China) Shi Han; Ksenia Zaytseva	Milana Zhabrailova (France) Yasmine Mansouri (France) Sarah Iliev; Daria Khomutsianskaya
January 12	Hurghada, Egypt; Hard; W15; Singles and doubles draws	Daria Egorova; 6–3, 6–1	(Italy) Camilla Zanolini	(Bulgaria) Lidia Encheva (Egypt) Lamis Alhussein Abdel Aziz	(Italy) Noemi Maines (France) Andrea Lola Popovic (Ukraine) Daria Yesypchuk (Sweden) Jacqueline Cabaj Awad
January 12	Hurghada, Egypt; Hard; W15; Singles and doubles draws	(Denmark) Sarafina Olivia Hansen (Czech Republic) Amelie Justine Hejtmanek; 2–6, 7–5, [10–7]	(Germany) Josy Daems (Ukraine) Daria Yesypchuk	(Bulgaria) Lidia Encheva (Egypt) Lamis Alhussein Abdel Aziz	(Italy) Noemi Maines (France) Andrea Lola Popovic (Ukraine) Daria Yesypchuk (Sweden) Jacqueline Cabaj Awad
January 19	Manama, Bahrain; Hard; W75; Singles and doubles draws	Alina Korneeva; 6–4, 6–0	(France) Fiona Ferro	(Netherlands) Arantxa Rus (United States) Carol Young Suh Lee	(United States) Claire Liu (France) Carole Monnet (France) Jessika Ponchet (Belgium) Sofia Costoulas
January 19	Manama, Bahrain; Hard; W75; Singles and doubles draws	(Slovakia) Viktória Hrunčáková; Anastasia Tikhonova; 6–4, 6–3	(Belgium) Polina Bakhmutkina (Germany) Mina Hodzic	(Netherlands) Arantxa Rus (United States) Carol Young Suh Lee	(United States) Claire Liu (France) Carole Monnet (France) Jessika Ponchet (Belgium) Sofia Costoulas
January 19	Leszno, Poland; Hard (i); W75; Singles and doubles draws	(Slovakia) Mia Pohánková; 6–3, 6–2	Julia Avdeeva	(Czech Republic) Barbora Palicová (Liechtenstein) Kathinka von Deichmann	(Poland) Zuzanna Pawlikowska (Germany) Mona Barthel (France) Diana Martynov (Bulgaria) Elizara Yaneva
January 19	Leszno, Poland; Hard (i); W75; Singles and doubles draws	(United Kingdom) Madeleine Brooks (United Kingdom) Amelia Rajecki; 7–6^{(7–2)}, 7–6^{(8–6)}	(United Kingdom) Mika Stojsavljevic (Czech Republic) Vendula Valdmannová	(Czech Republic) Barbora Palicová (Liechtenstein) Kathinka von Deichmann	(Poland) Zuzanna Pawlikowska (Germany) Mona Barthel (France) Diana Martynov (Bulgaria) Elizara Yaneva
January 19	Monastir, Tunisia; Hard; W50; Singles and doubles draws	Anastasia Gasanova; 7–5, 2–6, 6–3	(Italy) Samira De Stefano	(United States) Carolyn Ansari (United States) Hibah Shaikh	(France) Yasmine Mansouri; Alisa Oktiabreva (Netherlands) Isis Louise van den Broek (Spain) Irene Burillo
January 19	Monastir, Tunisia; Hard; W50; Singles and doubles draws	(Netherlands) Britt du Pree (Netherlands) Sarah van Emst; 6–2, 4–6, [10–6]	(United Kingdom) Alicia Dudeney (France) Tiphanie Lemaître	(United States) Carolyn Ansari (United States) Hibah Shaikh	(France) Yasmine Mansouri; Alisa Oktiabreva (Netherlands) Isis Louise van den Broek (Spain) Irene Burillo
January 19	Petit-Bourg (Guadeloupe), France; Hard; W35; Singles and doubles draws	(France) Margaux Rouvroy; 3–6, 6–3, 6–1	Kira Pavlova	(France) Emma Léné (Israel) Lina Glushko	(United States) Jaeda Daniel (Japan) Mio Mushika (France) Daphnée Mpetshi Perricard (France) Alizé Lim
January 19	Petit-Bourg (Guadeloupe), France; Hard; W35; Singles and doubles draws	(Morocco) Yasmine Kabbaj (France) Mathilde Lollia; 6–2, 6–1	(France) Audrey Moutama (France) Nehanda Thomias	(France) Emma Léné (Israel) Lina Glushko	(United States) Jaeda Daniel (Japan) Mio Mushika (France) Daphnée Mpetshi Perricard (France) Alizé Lim
January 19	Weston, United States; Clay; W35; Singles and doubles draws	(United States) Akasha Urhobo; 6–2, 4–6, 6–2	(United States) Madison Brengle	(Sweden) Kajsa Rinaldo Persson (Canada) Bianca Andreescu	(United States) Victoria Hu (Ukraine) Katarina Zavatska (Japan) Ena Koike (Bulgaria) Lia Karatancheva
January 19	Weston, United States; Clay; W35; Singles and doubles draws	(China) Dang Yiming (China) You Xiaodi; 6–3, 2–6, [10–8]	(United States) Hanna Chang (United States) Victoria Hu	(Sweden) Kajsa Rinaldo Persson (Canada) Bianca Andreescu	(United States) Victoria Hu (Ukraine) Katarina Zavatska (Japan) Ena Koike (Bulgaria) Lia Karatancheva
January 19	Buenos Aires, Argentina; Clay; W35; Singles and doubles draws	(Brazil) Carolina Alves; 6–0, 6–2	(Spain) Carlota Martínez Círez	(Italy) Dalila Spiteri (Greece) Martha Matoula	(Argentina) Julia Riera (Mexico) María Fernanda Navarro Oliva (United States) Anna Rogers (Brazil) Carolina Bohrer Martins
January 19	Buenos Aires, Argentina; Clay; W35; Singles and doubles draws	(Chile) Fernanda Labraña (Brazil) Rebeca Pereira; 6–3, 5–7, [10–7]	(Argentina) Carla Markus (Argentina) María Florencia Urrutia	(Italy) Dalila Spiteri (Greece) Martha Matoula	(Argentina) Julia Riera (Mexico) María Fernanda Navarro Oliva (United States) Anna Rogers (Brazil) Carolina Bohrer Martins
January 19	Antalya, Turkiye; Clay; W15; Singles and doubles draws	Singles and doubles competition was cancelled due to ongoing poor weather			
January 26	ITF Fujairah Championships; Fujairah, United Arab Emirates; Hard; W100; Singles – Doubles	(Austria) Lilli Tagger; 6–4, 6–2	(United Kingdom) Harriet Dart	(Mexico) Renata Zarazúa; Alina Korneeva	(Australia) Arina Rodionova (Slovakia) Viktória Hrunčáková (United States) Carol Young Suh Lee (France) Diane Parry
January 26	ITF Fujairah Championships; Fujairah, United Arab Emirates; Hard; W100; Singles – Doubles	(United Kingdom) Harriet Dart (United Kingdom) Maia Lumsden; 6–1, 6–0	(Netherlands) Isabelle Haverlag; Elena Pridankina	(Mexico) Renata Zarazúa; Alina Korneeva	(Australia) Arina Rodionova (Slovakia) Viktória Hrunčáková (United States) Carol Young Suh Lee (France) Diane Parry
January 26	San Diego Open; San Diego, United States; Hard; W100; Singles and doubles draws	(United States) Elvina Kalieva; 3–6, 6–3, 6–1	(United States) Elizabeth Mandlik	(United States) Jennifer Brady (United States) Mary Stoiana	(United States) Louisa Chirico (Canada) Cadence Brace (Canada) Kayla Cross; Kristina Liutova
January 26	San Diego Open; San Diego, United States; Hard; W100; Singles and doubles draws	(Canada) Kayla Cross (United States) Alana Smith; 6–2, 6–3	(United States) Catherine Harrison (United States) Dalayna Hewitt	(United States) Jennifer Brady (United States) Mary Stoiana	(United States) Louisa Chirico (Canada) Cadence Brace (Canada) Kayla Cross; Kristina Liutova
January 26	Porto Women's Indoor ITF; Porto, Portugal; Hard (i); W75; Singles and doubles draws	(Turkey) Ayla Aksu; 7–5, 6–4	(Bulgaria) Elizara Yaneva	(Portugal) Angelina Voloshchuk (Netherlands) Anouk Koevermans	(Italy) Laura Mair (Portugal) Francisca Jorge (United States) Fiona Crawley (Belgium) Jeline Vandromme
January 26	Porto Women's Indoor ITF; Porto, Portugal; Hard (i); W75; Singles and doubles draws	(Portugal) Francisca Jorge (Portugal) Matilde Jorge; 6–2, 6–4	(Ukraine) Nadiia Kolb (Slovenia) Kristina Novak	(Portugal) Angelina Voloshchuk (Netherlands) Anouk Koevermans	(Italy) Laura Mair (Portugal) Francisca Jorge (United States) Fiona Crawley (Belgium) Jeline Vandromme
January 26	Vero Beach International Tennis Open; Vero Beach, United States; Clay; W75; Singles and doubles draws	(Canada) Bianca Andreescu; 7–5, 6–1	(China) You Xiaodi	(Argentina) Jazmín Ortenzi (United States) Whitney Osuigwe	(United States) Caroline Dolehide (Sweden) Kajsa Rinaldo Persson (China) Xu Shilin (United States) Sachia Vickery
January 26	Vero Beach International Tennis Open; Vero Beach, United States; Clay; W75; Singles and doubles draws	(United States) Allura Zamarripa (United States) Maribella Zamarripa; Walkover	(Argentina) Jazmín Ortenzi (United States) Anna Rogers	(Argentina) Jazmín Ortenzi (United States) Whitney Osuigwe	(United States) Caroline Dolehide (Sweden) Kajsa Rinaldo Persson (China) Xu Shilin (United States) Sachia Vickery
January 26	Monastir, Tunisia; Hard; W50; Singles and doubles draws	(China) Shi Han; 4–6, 6–2, 6–4	(Spain) Marina Bassols Ribera	Alisa Oktiabreva; Kristina Dmitruk	Ksenia Zaytseva (United States) Carolyn Ansari (France) Tiphanie Lemaître (Netherlands) Britt du Pree
January 26	Monastir, Tunisia; Hard; W50; Singles and doubles draws	(France) Yasmine Mansouri (Serbia) Elena Milovanović; 6–2, 6–3	(Netherlands) Loes Ebeling Koning (Netherlands) Isis Louise van den Broek	Alisa Oktiabreva; Kristina Dmitruk	Ksenia Zaytseva (United States) Carolyn Ansari (France) Tiphanie Lemaître (Netherlands) Britt du Pree
January 26	Birmingham, United Kingdom; Hard (i); W35; Singles and doubles draws	(Estonia) Elena Malõgina; 6–4, 6–4	(Germany) Noma Noha Akugue	(United Kingdom) Amelia Rajecki (Italy) Francesca Pace	(United Kingdom) Emily Appleton (Germany) Eva Bennemann (Germany) Josy Daems (United Kingdom) Hannah Klugman
January 26	Birmingham, United Kingdom; Hard (i); W35; Singles and doubles draws	(Chinese Taipei) Lee Ya-hsin (Hong Kong) Cody Wong; 6–1, 6–3	(Germany) Noma Noha Akugue (Netherlands) Stéphanie Visscher	(United Kingdom) Amelia Rajecki (Italy) Francesca Pace	(United Kingdom) Emily Appleton (Germany) Eva Bennemann (Germany) Josy Daems (United Kingdom) Hannah Klugman
January 26	Antalya, Turkiye; Clay; W15; Singles and doubles draws	(Slovakia) Nina Vargová; 7–6^{(7–4)}, 6–1	(Italy) Beatrice Ricci	(Germany) Gina Marie Dittmann (Switzerland) Fiona Ganz	(Germany) Joëlle Steur (Italy) Carla Giambelli; Daria Lodikova (Spain) Ruth Roura Llaverias
January 26	Antalya, Turkiye; Clay; W15; Singles and doubles draws	(Japan) Nanari Katsumi (Japan) Miyu Nakashima; 4–6, 6–2, [10–2]	(Japan) Mana Kawamura; Elina Nepliy	(Germany) Gina Marie Dittmann (Switzerland) Fiona Ganz	(Germany) Joëlle Steur (Italy) Carla Giambelli; Daria Lodikova (Spain) Ruth Roura Llaverias
January 26	Sharm El Sheikh, Egypt; Hard; W15; Singles and doubles draws	(China) Ren Yufei; 6–7^{(2–7)}, 7–5, 6–0	(Bulgaria) Isabella Shinikova	(Italy) Camilla Zanolini (Germany) Selina Dal	(Belgium) Katarina Kujovic (Norway) Malene Helgø; Valeriia Iushchenko (Austria) Ekaterina Perelygina
January 26	Sharm El Sheikh, Egypt; Hard; W15; Singles and doubles draws	(Egypt) Lamis Alhussein Abdel Aziz (China) Ren Yufei; 7–6^{(7–4)}, 6–2	(China) Chen Mengyi (China) Wang Meiling	(Italy) Camilla Zanolini (Germany) Selina Dal	(Belgium) Katarina Kujovic (Norway) Malene Helgø; Valeriia Iushchenko (Austria) Ekaterina Perelygina

=== February ===
Week of	Tournament	Winner	Runners-up	Semifinalists	Quarterfinalists
February 2	Queensland International; Brisbane, Australia; Hard; W75; Singles and doubles draws	(Australia) Talia Gibson; 6–3, 7–6^{(9–7)}	(Japan) Nao Hibino	(China) Zhu Lin (China) Ma Yexin	(Japan) Hayu Kinoshita (Japan) Sara Saito (Australia) Taylah Preston (Australia) Emerson Jones
February 2	Queensland International; Brisbane, Australia; Hard; W75; Singles and doubles draws	(Japan) Hayu Kinoshita (China) Zhang Ying; 7–6^{(7–5)}, 7–5	(Australia) Petra Hule (Australia) Elena Micic	(China) Zhu Lin (China) Ma Yexin	(Japan) Hayu Kinoshita (Japan) Sara Saito (Australia) Taylah Preston (Australia) Emerson Jones
February 2	Open Andrézieux-Bouthéon 42; Andrézieux-Bouthéon, France; Hard (i); W75; Singles – Doubles	Julia Avdeeva; 6–3, 7–5	(Ukraine) Veronika Podrez	(China) Li Zongyu (France) Amandine Monnot	(Netherlands) Anouck Vrancken Peeters (China) Yao Xinxin (China) Yang Yidi (France) Manon Léonard
February 2	Open Andrézieux-Bouthéon 42; Andrézieux-Bouthéon, France; Hard (i); W75; Singles – Doubles	(France) Julie Belgraver (Belgium) Lara Salden; 6–4, 3–6, [10–5]	(Chinese Taipei) Li Yu-yun (China) Li Zongyu	(China) Li Zongyu (France) Amandine Monnot	(Netherlands) Anouck Vrancken Peeters (China) Yao Xinxin (China) Yang Yidi (France) Manon Léonard
February 2	Porto Women's Indoor ITF 2 Porto, Portugal; Hard (i); W50; Singles and doubles draws	(United States) Fiona Crawley; 6–7^{(4–7)}, 6–3, 6–4	(Bulgaria) Elizara Yaneva	(North Macedonia) Lina Gjorcheska (Croatia) Lea Bošković	(Greece) Despina Papamichail (Spain) Guiomar Maristany (Netherlands) Anouk Koevermans (Slovakia) Mia Pohánková
February 2	Porto Women's Indoor ITF 2 Porto, Portugal; Hard (i); W50; Singles and doubles draws	(Spain) Ángela Fita Boluda (Switzerland) Ylena In-Albon; 6–4, 7–6^{(7–5)}	(Germany) Noma Noha Akugue (Bosnia and Herzegovina) Anita Wagner	(North Macedonia) Lina Gjorcheska (Croatia) Lea Bošković	(Greece) Despina Papamichail (Spain) Guiomar Maristany (Netherlands) Anouk Koevermans (Slovakia) Mia Pohánková
February 2	Orlando, United States; Hard; W50; Singles and doubles draws	(United States) Kayla Day; 6–4, 6–2	(United States) Katrina Scott	(Canada) Kayla Cross (United States) Eryn Cayetano	(Venezuela) Sofía Elena Cabezas Domínguez (United States) Mary Stoiana (Argentina) Martina Capurro Taborda (United States) Haley Giavara
February 2	Orlando, United States; Hard; W50; Singles and doubles draws	(Bulgaria) Lia Karatancheva (Ukraine) Anita Sahdiieva; 6–3, 6–4	(Brazil) Thaísa Grana Pedretti (Bolivia) Noelia Zeballos	(Canada) Kayla Cross (United States) Eryn Cayetano	(Venezuela) Sofía Elena Cabezas Domínguez (United States) Mary Stoiana (Argentina) Martina Capurro Taborda (United States) Haley Giavara
February 2	Sheffield, United Kingdom; Hard (i); W35; Singles and doubles draws	(Slovakia) Katarína Kužmová; 1–6, 7–5, 6–3	(United Kingdom) Amelia Rajecki	(United Kingdom) Katy Dunne (Belgium) Tamila Gadamauri	(Germany) Julia Stusek (United Kingdom) Hannah Klugman (Italy) Federica Urgesi (United Kingdom) Eliz Maloney
February 2	Sheffield, United Kingdom; Hard (i); W35; Singles and doubles draws	(United Kingdom) Lauryn John-Baptiste (United Kingdom) Amelia Rajecki; 4–6, 6–3, [10–8]	(United Kingdom) Alicia Dudeney (Slovakia) Katarína Kužmová	(United Kingdom) Katy Dunne (Belgium) Tamila Gadamauri	(Germany) Julia Stusek (United Kingdom) Hannah Klugman (Italy) Federica Urgesi (United Kingdom) Eliz Maloney
February 2	Antalya, Turkiye; Clay; W15; Singles and doubles draws	Anastasia Zolotareva; 6–3, 7–6^{(7–5)}	(Slovakia) Nina Vargová	(Ukraine) Yelyzaveta Kotliar (Uzbekistan) Laima Vladson	(Italy) Viola Turini (Italy) Francesca Gandolfi (Italy) Anastasia Bertacchi; Daria Lodikova
February 2	Antalya, Turkiye; Clay; W15; Singles and doubles draws	(Italy) Anastasia Bertacchi (Italy) Francesca Gandolfi; 6–3, 1–6, [10–8]	(Hungary) Melinda Bíró (Turkey) İrem Kurt	(Ukraine) Yelyzaveta Kotliar (Uzbekistan) Laima Vladson	(Italy) Viola Turini (Italy) Francesca Gandolfi (Italy) Anastasia Bertacchi; Daria Lodikova
February 2	Sharm El Sheikh, Egypt; Hard; W15; Singles and doubles draws	(Austria) Ekaterina Perelygina; 6–4, 2–6, 6–4	Alina Tikhonova	(Egypt) Lamis Alhussein Abdel Aziz (Egypt) Nada Fouad	Anastasia Efremova (Japan) Shiho Tsujioka (China) Ren Yufei (China) Chen Mengyi
February 2	Sharm El Sheikh, Egypt; Hard; W15; Singles and doubles draws	(Egypt) Lamis Alhussein Abdel Aziz (China) Ren Yufei; 4–6, 7–6^{(7–3)}, [10–5]	(China) Liu Yuhan (China) Wang Meiling	(Egypt) Lamis Alhussein Abdel Aziz (Egypt) Nada Fouad	Anastasia Efremova (Japan) Shiho Tsujioka (China) Ren Yufei (China) Chen Mengyi
February 2	Monastir, Tunisia; Hard; W15; Singles and doubles draws	(Poland) Weronika Falkowska; 6–2, 7–6^{(7–5)}	(Spain) Aran Teixidó García	(United Kingdom) Allegra Korpanec Davies (Serbia) Dunja Marić	(Germany) Valentina Steiner (Ukraine) Daria Yesypchuk (Italy) Arianna Zucchini (France) Jenny Lim
February 2	Monastir, Tunisia; Hard; W15; Singles and doubles draws	(United States) Julia Adams (China) Zhu Chenting; 6–2, 6–3	(Hong Kong) Lai Ching-laam (South Korea) Lee Hyun-yee	(United Kingdom) Allegra Korpanec Davies (Serbia) Dunja Marić	(Germany) Valentina Steiner (Ukraine) Daria Yesypchuk (Italy) Arianna Zucchini (France) Jenny Lim
February 9	Queensland International II; Brisbane, Australia; Hard; W75; Singles and doubles draws	(Australia) Emerson Jones; 6–4, 7–5	(China) Zhu Lin	(Australia) Talia Gibson (Australia) Taylah Preston	(China) Ma Yexin (Japan) Miho Kuramochi (Japan) Nao Hibino (Japan) Hiromi Abe
February 9	Queensland International II; Brisbane, Australia; Hard; W75; Singles and doubles draws	(Japan) Natsumi Kawaguchi (Japan) Sara Saito; 6–2, 6–4	(Australia) Gabriella Da Silva-Fick (Australia) Tenika McGiffin	(Australia) Talia Gibson (Australia) Taylah Preston	(China) Ma Yexin (Japan) Miho Kuramochi (Japan) Nao Hibino (Japan) Hiromi Abe
February 9	Pune, India; Hard; W75; Singles and doubles draws	(Belgium) Hanne Vandewinkel; 7–6^{(7–0)}, 7–6^{(7–5)}	Tatiana Prozorova	(France) Léolia Jeanjean (Thailand) Mananchaya Sawangkaew	Maria Kalyakina (Slovakia) Viktória Morvayová (United Kingdom) Harriet Dart (South Korea) Park So-hyun
February 9	Pune, India; Hard; W75; Singles and doubles draws	(India) Shrivalli Bhamidipaty (India) Ankita Raina; 7–6^{(7–3)}, 6–3	(Japan) Misaki Matsuda (Japan) Eri Shimizu	(France) Léolia Jeanjean (Thailand) Mananchaya Sawangkaew	Maria Kalyakina (Slovakia) Viktória Morvayová (United Kingdom) Harriet Dart (South Korea) Park So-hyun
February 9	Conseq Prague Open; Prague, Czechia; Hard (i); W75; Singles and doubles draws	(Czech Republic) Tereza Martincová; 6–3, 6–4	(Austria) Sinja Kraus	(Czech Republic) Jana Kovačková (Czech Republic) Anna Sisková	(Germany) Mona Barthel (Spain) Guiomar Maristany (France) Jessika Ponchet (Italy) Lucia Bronzetti
February 9	Conseq Prague Open; Prague, Czechia; Hard (i); W75; Singles and doubles draws	(Czech Republic) Alena Kovačková (Czech Republic) Jana Kovačková; 6–4, 6–3	(United Kingdom) Madeleine Brooks (United Kingdom) Amelia Rajecki	(Czech Republic) Jana Kovačková (Czech Republic) Anna Sisková	(Germany) Mona Barthel (Spain) Guiomar Maristany (France) Jessika Ponchet (Italy) Lucia Bronzetti
February 9	Open de l'Isère; Grenoble, France; Hard (i); W50; Singles and doubles draws	(Switzerland) Céline Naef; 7–5, 6–3	(Belgium) Jeline Vandromme	(Ukraine) Veronika Podrez (Italy) Tyra Caterina Grant	(China) Yao Xinxin (Italy) Camilla Rosatello (Burundi) Sada Nahimana (United Kingdom) Hannah Klugman
February 9	Open de l'Isère; Grenoble, France; Hard (i); W50; Singles and doubles draws	(France) Tiphanie Lemaître (Ukraine) Veronika Podrez; 6–3, 6–2	(Netherlands) Demi Tran (Netherlands) Lian Tran	(Ukraine) Veronika Podrez (Italy) Tyra Caterina Grant	(China) Yao Xinxin (Italy) Camilla Rosatello (Burundi) Sada Nahimana (United Kingdom) Hannah Klugman
February 9	Antalya, Turkiye; Clay; W35; Singles and doubles draws	(Argentina) Luisina Giovannini; 4–6, 6–4, 6–2	Rada Zolotareva	(Italy) Nuria Brancaccio (Slovenia) Polona Hercog	(Italy) Aurora Zantedeschi (Italy) Jennifer Ruggeri; Alexandra Shubladze (Ukraine) Yelyzaveta Kotliar
February 9	Antalya, Turkiye; Clay; W35; Singles and doubles draws	(Italy) Jennifer Ruggeri (Italy) Aurora Zantedeschi; 6–4, 7–6^{(7–1)}	(Argentina) Luisina Giovannini (Chile) Antonia Vergara Rivera	(Italy) Nuria Brancaccio (Slovenia) Polona Hercog	(Italy) Aurora Zantedeschi (Italy) Jennifer Ruggeri; Alexandra Shubladze (Ukraine) Yelyzaveta Kotliar
February 9	Manacor, Spain; Hard; W15; Singles and doubles draws	(Spain) Neus Torner Sensano; 6–2, 6–0	(China) Jialin Tian	(United States) Ava Hrastar (Spain) María García Cid	(Italy) Federica Sacco (United States) Emma Jackson (Netherlands) Merel Hoedt (Hungary) Adrienn Nagy
February 9	Manacor, Spain; Hard; W15; Singles and doubles draws	(United Kingdom) Esther Adeshina (Colombia) Valentina Mediorreal; 6–1, 6–0	(Spain) Celia Anson Sánchez (Spain) María Oliver Sánchez	(United States) Ava Hrastar (Spain) María García Cid	(Italy) Federica Sacco (United States) Emma Jackson (Netherlands) Merel Hoedt (Hungary) Adrienn Nagy
February 9	Sharm El Sheikh, Egypt; Hard; W15; Singles and doubles draws	(Egypt) Lamis Alhussein Abdel Aziz; 7–5, 4–6, 7–6^{(7–3)}	(Egypt) Sandra Samir	Kristina Kroitor (China) Ren Yufei	(Egypt) Nada Fouad (United States) Jamilah Snells (South Korea) Choi Seo-yun (Kosovo) Arlinda Rushiti
February 9	Sharm El Sheikh, Egypt; Hard; W15; Singles and doubles draws	(Turkey) Defne Çırpanlı (Egypt) Sandra Samir; Walkover	(Kosovo) Arlinda Rushiti (Germany) Anja Wildgruber	Kristina Kroitor (China) Ren Yufei	(Egypt) Nada Fouad (United States) Jamilah Snells (South Korea) Choi Seo-yun (Kosovo) Arlinda Rushiti
February 9	Monastir, Tunisia; Hard; W15; Singles and doubles draws	(Poland) Weronika Falkowska; 6–3, 6–4	(Bulgaria) Iva Ivanova	(Belgium) Margaux Maquet (Greece) Sapfo Sakellaridi	(Slovakia) Radka Zelníčková (China) Lu Jiajing (Ukraine) Daria Yesypchuk (China) Wang Jiaqi
February 9	Monastir, Tunisia; Hard; W15; Singles and doubles draws	(South Korea) Choi On-yu (Bulgaria) Yoana Konstantinova; 5–7, 6–1, [10–8]	(Greece) Sapfo Sakellaridi (Slovakia) Radka Zelníčková	(Belgium) Margaux Maquet (Greece) Sapfo Sakellaridi	(Slovakia) Radka Zelníčková (China) Lu Jiajing (Ukraine) Daria Yesypchuk (China) Wang Jiaqi
February 16	ITF Bengaluru Open; Bengaluru, India; Hard; W100; Singles – Doubles	(Belgium) Hanne Vandewinkel; 6–0, 6–1	(India) Vaishnavi Adkar	Polina Iatcenko (Thailand) Lanlana Tararudee	(Australia) Talia Gibson (China) Tian Fangran (Australia) Taylah Preston; Elena Pridankina
February 16	ITF Bengaluru Open; Bengaluru, India; Hard; W100; Singles – Doubles	(Japan) Misaki Matsuda (Japan) Eri Shimizu; 6–4, 3–6, [10–5]	(Indonesia) Priska Nugroho (India) Ankita Raina	Polina Iatcenko (Thailand) Lanlana Tararudee	(Australia) Talia Gibson (China) Tian Fangran (Australia) Taylah Preston; Elena Pridankina
February 16	AK Ladies Open; Altenkirchen, Germany; Carpet (i); W75; Singles and doubles draws	(Germany) Noma Noha Akugue; 6–2, 6–1	Julia Avdeeva	(Germany) Julia Stusek (Poland) Martyna Kubka	(Germany) Mariella Thamm (Switzerland) Alina Granwehr (Switzerland) Susan Bandecchi (Switzerland) Valentina Ryser
February 16	AK Ladies Open; Altenkirchen, Germany; Carpet (i); W75; Singles and doubles draws	(Poland) Martyna Kubka (Lithuania) Justina Mikulskytė; 6–1, 6–2	(Germany) Tessa Brockmann (Germany) Nastasja Schunk	(Germany) Julia Stusek (Poland) Martyna Kubka	(Germany) Mariella Thamm (Switzerland) Alina Granwehr (Switzerland) Susan Bandecchi (Switzerland) Valentina Ryser
February 16	Mâcon, France; Hard (i); W50; Singles and doubles draws	(Switzerland) Céline Naef; 6–4, 6–1	(France) Julie Belgraver	(France) Amandine Monnot; Aliona Falei	(China) Yao Xinxin (Turkey) Ayla Aksu (Poland) Weronika Ewald (France) Jenny Lim
February 16	Mâcon, France; Hard (i); W50; Singles and doubles draws	(Chinese Taipei) Li Yu-yun (China) Li Zongyu; 6–3, 5–7, [10–7]	(Italy) Enola Chiesa (France) Jenny Lim	(France) Amandine Monnot; Aliona Falei	(China) Yao Xinxin (Turkey) Ayla Aksu (Poland) Weronika Ewald (France) Jenny Lim
February 16	ITF The Hague; The Hague, Netherlands; Hard (i); W35; Singles and doubles draws	(Ukraine) Veronika Podrez; 6–3, 6–3	(Belgium) Clara Vlasselaer	Kira Pavlova (Netherlands) Britt du Pree	(Luxembourg) Marie Weckerle (Netherlands) Anouck Vrancken Peeters (Germany) Jule Niemeier (Netherlands) Stéphanie Visscher
February 16	ITF The Hague; The Hague, Netherlands; Hard (i); W35; Singles and doubles draws	(Canada) Ariana Arseneault (Canada) Raphaëlle Lacasse; 6–4, 3–6, [10–5]	(New Zealand) Valentina Ivanov (Denmark) Rebecca Munk Mortensen	Kira Pavlova (Netherlands) Britt du Pree	(Luxembourg) Marie Weckerle (Netherlands) Anouck Vrancken Peeters (Germany) Jule Niemeier (Netherlands) Stéphanie Visscher
February 16	Las Vegas, United States; Hard; W35; Singles and doubles draws	Kristina Liutova; 6–2, 6–4	(United States) Chukwumelije Clarke	(United States) Julieta Pareja (United States) Salma Ewing	(United States) Vivian Wolff (United Kingdom) Ella McDonald (United States) Kelly Keller (United States) Savannah Broadus
February 16	Las Vegas, United States; Hard; W35; Singles and doubles draws	(Italy) Anastasia Abbagnato (United States) Haley Giavara; 6–3, 4–6, [10–8]	(Mexico) Jessica Hinojosa Gómez (Ecuador) Mell Reasco González	(United States) Julieta Pareja (United States) Salma Ewing	(United States) Vivian Wolff (United Kingdom) Ella McDonald (United States) Kelly Keller (United States) Savannah Broadus
February 16	Manacor, Spain; Hard; W15; Singles and doubles draws	(Italy) Laura Mair; 6–4, 1–6, 6–4	(Spain) Aran Teixidó García	(Czech Republic) Lucie Petruzelová (Spain) Neus Torner Sensano	(Spain) Cristina Diaz Adrover (Spain) Lorena Solar Donoso (Mexico) Midori Castillo Meza (Poland) Marcelina Podlińska
February 16	Manacor, Spain; Hard; W15; Singles and doubles draws	(Mexico) Midori Castillo Meza (Colombia) Valentina Mediorreal; 7–5, 6–4	(Netherlands) Merel Hoedt (Uzbekistan) Sevil Yuldasheva	(Czech Republic) Lucie Petruzelová (Spain) Neus Torner Sensano	(Spain) Cristina Diaz Adrover (Spain) Lorena Solar Donoso (Mexico) Midori Castillo Meza (Poland) Marcelina Podlińska
February 16	Antalya, Turkiye; Clay; W15; Singles and doubles draws	(Croatia) Tena Lukas; 6–1, 6–4	(Italy) Giorgia Pedone	(Germany) Eva Marie Voracek (Romania) Andreea Prisăcariu	(Italy) Aurora Zantedeschi (Chile) Antonia Vergara Rivera; Darya Astakhova (Romania) Diana-Ioana Simionescu
February 16	Antalya, Turkiye; Clay; W15; Singles and doubles draws	(Italy) Giorgia Pedone (Italy) Aurora Zantedeschi; 6–2, 3–6, [10–4]	(China) Huang Yujia (Japan) Nanari Katsumi	(Germany) Eva Marie Voracek (Romania) Andreea Prisăcariu	(Italy) Aurora Zantedeschi (Chile) Antonia Vergara Rivera; Darya Astakhova (Romania) Diana-Ioana Simionescu
February 16	Sharm El Sheikh, Egypt; Hard; W15; Singles and doubles draws	(China) Ren Yufei; 6–1, 6–3	(China) Liu Yuhan	(Lithuania) Andrė Lukošiūtė; Kristina Kroitor	Daria Zelinskaya (Egypt) Hania Abouelsaad (Austria) Ekaterina Perelygina; Yuliya Hatouka
February 16	Sharm El Sheikh, Egypt; Hard; W15; Singles and doubles draws	(Ukraine) Kateryna Lazarenko (Lithuania) Andrė Lukošiūtė; 6–1, 6–4	Yuliya Hatouka; Daria Zelinskaya	(Lithuania) Andrė Lukošiūtė; Kristina Kroitor	Daria Zelinskaya (Egypt) Hania Abouelsaad (Austria) Ekaterina Perelygina; Yuliya Hatouka
February 16	Monastir, Tunisia; Hard; W15; Singles and doubles draws	(China) Shi Han; 6–4, 6–2	(Greece) Sapfo Sakellaridi	(Slovenia) Pia Lovrič (Czech Republic) Eliška Ticháčková	(China) Zhu Chenting (China) Lu Jiajing (Argentina) Agustina Chlpac (Belgium) Margaux Maquet
February 16	Monastir, Tunisia; Hard; W15; Singles and doubles draws	(Japan) Yuka Hosoki (New Zealand) Elyse Tse; 7–6^{(10–8)}, 6–4	(Latvia) Kamilla Bartone (Bulgaria) Iva Ivanova	(Slovenia) Pia Lovrič (Czech Republic) Eliška Ticháčková	(China) Zhu Chenting (China) Lu Jiajing (Argentina) Agustina Chlpac (Belgium) Margaux Maquet
February 16	Palm Coast, United States; Clay; W15; Singles and doubles draws	(United Kingdom) Sofia Johnson; 6–4, 6–2	(Brazil) Thaísa Grana Pedretti	(United States) Carlota Moreno (United States) Bella Payne	(Brazil) Carolina Bohrer Martins (United States) Emily De Oliveira (Canada) Alexandra Vagramov (France) Charlotte Narti
February 16	Palm Coast, United States; Clay; W15; Singles and doubles draws	(Brazil) Carolina Bohrer Martins (Brazil) Thaísa Grana Pedretti; 7–6^{(7–4)}, 6–7^{(5–7)}, [10–4]	(United States) Kolie Allen (Mexico) Sabastiani León	(United States) Carlota Moreno (United States) Bella Payne	(Brazil) Carolina Bohrer Martins (United States) Emily De Oliveira (Canada) Alexandra Vagramov (France) Charlotte Narti
February 23	Porto Women's Indoor ITF 3 Porto, Portugal; Hard (i); W75; Singles and doubles draws	(Netherlands) Anouk Koevermans; 6–2, 1–0 ret.	(United Kingdom) Harriet Dart	(Turkey) Ayla Aksu (Poland) Martyna Kubka	(Portugal) Francisca Jorge; Aliona Falei (United States) Fiona Crawley (Germany) Mona Barthel
February 23	Porto Women's Indoor ITF 3 Porto, Portugal; Hard (i); W75; Singles and doubles draws	(Italy) Deborah Chiesa (Switzerland) Naïma Karamoko; 6–2, 6–2	(Italy) Angelica Moratelli (Italy) Camilla Rosatello	(Turkey) Ayla Aksu (Poland) Martyna Kubka	(Portugal) Francisca Jorge; Aliona Falei (United States) Fiona Crawley (Germany) Mona Barthel
February 23	Empire Women's Indoor; Trnava, Slovakia; Hard (i); W75; Singles and doubles draws	(Czech Republic) Laura Samson; 6–4, 6–2	(Czech Republic) Lucie Havlíčková	(Estonia) Elena Malõgina (Ukraine) Veronika Podrez	(Serbia) Lola Radivojević (Czech Republic) Aneta Laboutková (Canada) Katherine Sebov (United States) Carol Young Suh Lee
February 23	Empire Women's Indoor; Trnava, Slovakia; Hard (i); W75; Singles and doubles draws	(Australia) Olivia Gadecki; Anastasia Tikhonova; 6–3, 6–3	(Czech Republic) Aneta Kučmová (Czech Republic) Aneta Laboutková	(Estonia) Elena Malõgina (Ukraine) Veronika Podrez	(Serbia) Lola Radivojević (Czech Republic) Aneta Laboutková (Canada) Katherine Sebov (United States) Carol Young Suh Lee
February 23	Burnie International; Burnie, Australia; Hard; W35; Singles and doubles draws	(Australia) Lizette Cabrera; 6–2, 6–3	(India) Vaidehi Chaudhari	(Australia) Elena Micic (Japan) Mio Mushika	(Finland) Anastasia Kulikova (Japan) Sayaka Ishii (China) Yuan Chengyiyi (China) Zhang Ruien
February 23	Burnie International; Burnie, Australia; Hard; W35; Singles and doubles draws	(Australia) Gabriella Da Silva-Fick (Australia) Tenika McGiffin; 6–4, 6–3	(New Zealand) Monique Barry (Australia) Alexandra Osborne	(Australia) Elena Micic (Japan) Mio Mushika	(Finland) Anastasia Kulikova (Japan) Sayaka Ishii (China) Yuan Chengyiyi (China) Zhang Ruien
February 23	Antalya, Turkey; Clay; W35; Singles and doubles draws	Alexandra Shubladze; 6–4, 6–4	(Argentina) Luisina Giovannini	(Italy) Aurora Zantedeschi (Spain) Ane Mintegi del Olmo	(Italy) Beatrice Ricci (Italy) Giorgia Pedone; Arina Bulatova (Ukraine) Anastasiia Sobolieva
February 23	Antalya, Turkey; Clay; W35; Singles and doubles draws	(Germany) Joëlle Steur (Slovakia) Nina Vargová; 1–6, 7–6^{(7–3)}, [10–7]	(Italy) Jennifer Ruggeri (Italy) Aurora Zantedeschi	(Italy) Aurora Zantedeschi (Spain) Ane Mintegi del Olmo	(Italy) Beatrice Ricci (Italy) Giorgia Pedone; Arina Bulatova (Ukraine) Anastasiia Sobolieva
February 23	Monastir, Tunisia; Hard; W35; Singles and doubles deaws	Alisa Oktiabreva; 7–6^{(7–4)}, 4–1 ret.	(Czech Republic) Eliška Ticháčková	(China) Sun Xinran (China) Shi Han	(Germany) Eva Bennemann (Italy) Diletta Cherubini (Italy) Noemi Basiletti (South Korea) Back Da-yeon
February 23	Monastir, Tunisia; Hard; W35; Singles and doubles deaws	(South Korea) Back Da-yeon (Greece) Sapfo Sakellaridi; 6–3, 6–2	Daria Egorova; Alina Yuneva	(China) Sun Xinran (China) Shi Han	(Germany) Eva Bennemann (Italy) Diletta Cherubini (Italy) Noemi Basiletti (South Korea) Back Da-yeon
February 23	Arcadia Women's Pro Open; Arcadia, United States; Hard; W35; Singles and doubles draws	(United States) Akasha Urhobo; 6–2, 2–6, 6–2	(United States) Thea Frodin	(United States) Lea Ma; Kristina Liutova	(United States) Eryn Cayetano (United States) Julieta Pareja (United States) Hanna Chang (United States) Haley Giavara
February 23	Arcadia Women's Pro Open; Arcadia, United States; Hard; W35; Singles and doubles draws	(United States) Eryn Cayetano (United States) Haley Giavara; 6–1, 6–1	(United States) Jaeda Daniel (Ukraine) Anita Sahdiieva	(United States) Lea Ma; Kristina Liutova	(United States) Eryn Cayetano (United States) Julieta Pareja (United States) Hanna Chang (United States) Haley Giavara
February 23	Gurugram, India; Hard; W15; Singles and doubles draws	(India) Zeel Desai; 6–2, 7–6^{(7–3)}	Polina Kuharenko	Anna Sedysheva; Ekaterina Yashina	Evgeniya Burdina (Thailand) Thasaporn Naklo (Japan) Michika Ozeki (Netherlands) Jasmijn Gimbrère
February 23	Gurugram, India; Hard; W15; Singles and doubles draws	(Thailand) Anchisa Chanta (Thailand) Thasaporn Naklo; 6–4, 7–6^{(7–0)}	Arina Arifullina; Evgeniya Burdina	Anna Sedysheva; Ekaterina Yashina	Evgeniya Burdina (Thailand) Thasaporn Naklo (Japan) Michika Ozeki (Netherlands) Jasmijn Gimbrère
February 23	Manacor, Spain; Hard; W15; Singles and doubles draws	(United Kingdom) Indianna Spink; 6–3, 7–6^{(7–3)}	(Spain) Carmen Gallardo Guevara	(Spain) Cristina Diaz Adrover (Switzerland) Paula Cembranos	(United Kingdom) Lauryn John-Baptiste (Spain) María García Cid (Czech Republic) Emma Slavíková (Netherlands) Merel Hoedt
February 23	Manacor, Spain; Hard; W15; Singles and doubles draws	(Netherlands) Merel Hoedt (Colombia) Valentina Mediorreal; 6–4, 7–5	(United Kingdom) Lauryn John-Baptiste (United Kingdom) Eliz Maloney	(Spain) Cristina Diaz Adrover (Switzerland) Paula Cembranos	(United Kingdom) Lauryn John-Baptiste (Spain) María García Cid (Czech Republic) Emma Slavíková (Netherlands) Merel Hoedt
February 23	Leimen, Germany; Hard (i); W15; Singles and doubles draws	(Croatia) Iva Primorac Pavičić; 6–2, 7–5	(Netherlands) Stéphanie Visscher	(Germany) Julia Stusek (Latvia) Sabīne Rutlauka	(Belgium) Tilwith Di Girolami (Netherlands) Charlotte van Zonneveld (Denmark) Rebecca Munk Mortensen (Italy) Gaia Maduzzi
February 23	Leimen, Germany; Hard (i); W15; Singles and doubles draws	(Germany) Josy Daems (Ukraine) Anastasiia Firman; 2–6, 7–6^{(7–5)}, [10–4]	(Czech Republic) Sarah Melany Fajmonová (Czech Republic) Karolína Vlčková	(Germany) Julia Stusek (Latvia) Sabīne Rutlauka	(Belgium) Tilwith Di Girolami (Netherlands) Charlotte van Zonneveld (Denmark) Rebecca Munk Mortensen (Italy) Gaia Maduzzi
February 23	Sharm El Sheikh, Egypt; Hard; W15; Singles and doubles draws	Yuliya Hatouka; 6–2, 6–3	(Slovenia) Ela Nala Milić	(Italy) Camilla Zanolini (Croatia) Karla Popović	(Switzerland) Ayline Samardzic; Anna Kubareva (Finland) Clarissa Blomqvist; Daria Zelinskaya
February 23	Sharm El Sheikh, Egypt; Hard; W15; Singles and doubles draws	Yuliya Hatouka; Daria Zelinskaya; 7–6^{(7–4)}, 4–6, [10–5]	(Turkey) İrem Kurt (Czech Republic) Denisa Žoldáková	(Italy) Camilla Zanolini (Croatia) Karla Popović	(Switzerland) Ayline Samardzic; Anna Kubareva (Finland) Clarissa Blomqvist; Daria Zelinskaya

=== March ===
Week of	Tournament	Winner	Runners-up	Semifinalists	Quarterfinalists
March 2	Empire Women's Indoor 2 Trnava, Slovakia; Hard (i); W75; Singles and doubles draws	(Belgium) Hanne Vandewinkel; 7–6^{(7–1)}, 6–1	(Ukraine) Daria Snigur	Erika Andreeva (Switzerland) Céline Naef	(Netherlands) Anouk Koevermans; Alina Korneeva (Bulgaria) Elizara Yaneva (Czech Republic) Lucie Havlíčková
March 2	Empire Women's Indoor 2 Trnava, Slovakia; Hard (i); W75; Singles and doubles draws	(Czech Republic) Anna Sisková; Anastasia Tikhonova; 6–1, 6–2	(Spain) Aliona Bolsova (Spain) Yvonne Cavallé Reimers	Erika Andreeva (Switzerland) Céline Naef	(Netherlands) Anouk Koevermans; Alina Korneeva (Bulgaria) Elizara Yaneva (Czech Republic) Lucie Havlíčková
March 2	Helsinki, Finland; Hard (i); W50; Singles and doubles draws	(Germany) Noma Noha Akugue; 4–0 ret.	(China) Gao Xinyu	(Belgium) Jeline Vandromme (Germany) Mona Barthel	(Sweden) Caijsa Hennemann (France) Harmony Tan; Julia Avdeeva (Estonia) Elena Malõgina
March 2	Helsinki, Finland; Hard (i); W50; Singles and doubles draws	(Sweden) Caijsa Hennemann (Sweden) Lisa Zaar; 2–6, 6–3, [10–8]	(United Kingdom) Emily Appleton (Slovakia) Viktória Hrunčáková	(Belgium) Jeline Vandromme (Germany) Mona Barthel	(Sweden) Caijsa Hennemann (France) Harmony Tan; Julia Avdeeva (Estonia) Elena Malõgina
March 2	Launceston Tennis International; Launceston, Australia; Hard; W35; Singles and doubles draws	(Australia) Lizette Cabrera; 3–6, 7–6^{(8–6)}, 6–2	(China) Yuan Chengyiyi	(Australia) Alana Subasic (Japan) Miho Kuramochi	(Australia) Sarah Rokusek (Australia) Elena Micic (Chinese Taipei) Wan I-wen (India) Vaidehi Chaudhari
March 2	Launceston Tennis International; Launceston, Australia; Hard; W35; Singles and doubles draws	(Japan) Kyōka Okamura (Japan) Naho Sato; 5–7, 7–5, [14–12]	(Australia) Gabriella Da Silva-Fick (Australia) Tenika McGiffin	(Australia) Alana Subasic (Japan) Miho Kuramochi	(Australia) Sarah Rokusek (Australia) Elena Micic (Chinese Taipei) Wan I-wen (India) Vaidehi Chaudhari
March 2	Kalaburagi, India; Hard; W35; Singles and doubles draws	(India) Vaishnavi Adkar; 7–6^{(7–3)}, 6–4	(India) Ankita Raina	(Netherlands) Jasmijn Gimbrère (Thailand) Thasaporn Naklo	(Israel) Maayan Laron; Elina Nepliy; Evgeniya Burdina (Thailand) Anchisa Chanta
March 2	Kalaburagi, India; Hard; W35; Singles and doubles draws	(India) Vaishnavi Adkar (India) Ankita Raina; 6–2, 6–2	(India) Akanksha Nitture (India) Soha Sadiq	(Netherlands) Jasmijn Gimbrère (Thailand) Thasaporn Naklo	(Israel) Maayan Laron; Elina Nepliy; Evgeniya Burdina (Thailand) Anchisa Chanta
March 2	Heraklion, Greece; Clay; W35; Singles and doubles draws	(Spain) Ane Mintegi del Olmo; 6–1 ret.	Darya Astakhova	(Bulgaria) Rositsa Dencheva (Spain) Ángela Fita Boluda	(Spain) Irene Burillo (Czech Republic) Alena Kovačková (Italy) Jennifer Ruggeri (Romania) Elena Ruxandra Bertea
March 2	Heraklion, Greece; Clay; W35; Singles and doubles draws	(Morocco) Yasmine Kabbaj (Ukraine) Nadiia Kolb; 6–2, 6–1	(Germany) Katharina Hobgarski (Slovakia) Nina Vargová	(Bulgaria) Rositsa Dencheva (Spain) Ángela Fita Boluda	(Spain) Irene Burillo (Czech Republic) Alena Kovačková (Italy) Jennifer Ruggeri (Romania) Elena Ruxandra Bertea
March 2	Monastir, Tunisia; Hard; W35; Singles and doubles draws	Aliona Falei; 4–6, 6–2, 6–4	(Spain) Eva Guerrero Álvarez	(China) Lu Jiajing (Italy) Noemi Basiletti	(Slovakia) Katarína Kužmová (Italy) Federica Urgesi; Milana Zhabrailova (South Korea) Back Da-yeon
March 2	Monastir, Tunisia; Hard; W35; Singles and doubles draws	(Slovakia) Katarína Kužmová (France) Yasmine Mansouri; 7–5, 7–6^{(7–5)}	(Poland) Weronika Falkowska (United States) Hibah Shaikh	(China) Lu Jiajing (Italy) Noemi Basiletti	(Slovakia) Katarína Kužmová (Italy) Federica Urgesi; Milana Zhabrailova (South Korea) Back Da-yeon
March 2	Maanshan, China; Hard (i); W15; Singles and doubles draws	(China) Wang Jiaqi; 6–1, 7–6^{(7–5)}	(South Korea) Jeong Bo-young	Anna Snigireva (South Korea) Jang Su-jeong	(China) Wang Jiayi (China) Wang Meiling (China) Sun Yingqun; Anastasia Lizunova
March 2	Maanshan, China; Hard (i); W15; Singles and doubles draws	(South Korea) Jeong Bo-young (South Korea) Cherry Kim; 6–1, 6–1	(China) Sun Yifan (China) Zhao Xichen	Anna Snigireva (South Korea) Jang Su-jeong	(China) Wang Jiayi (China) Wang Meiling (China) Sun Yingqun; Anastasia Lizunova
March 2	Hagetmau, France; Hard (i); W15; Singles and doubles draws	(Bulgaria) Lidia Encheva; 6–4, 6–3	(France) Yara Bartashevich	(United Kingdom) Alicia Dudeney (Spain) Celia Cerviño Ruiz	(France) Marie Mattel (Spain) Carmen Gallardo Guevara (Ukraine) Yelyzaveta Kotliar (Latvia) Sabīne Rutlauka
March 2	Hagetmau, France; Hard (i); W15; Singles and doubles draws	(United Kingdom) Alicia Dudeney (Czech Republic) Lucie Petruzelová; 6–4, 6–2	(Italy) Carlotta Moccia (Spain) Paula Ortega Redondo	(United Kingdom) Alicia Dudeney (Spain) Celia Cerviño Ruiz	(France) Marie Mattel (Spain) Carmen Gallardo Guevara (Ukraine) Yelyzaveta Kotliar (Latvia) Sabīne Rutlauka
March 2	Sharm El Sheikh, Egypt; Hard; W15; Singles and doubles draws	Yuliya Hatouka; 0–6, 6–2, 7–6^{(12–10)}	(Italy) Camilla Zanolini	(China) Ma Ruoxi (Egypt) Yasmin Ezzat	(Chinese Taipei) Tsao Chia-yi (France) Alyssa Reguer; Daria Zelinskaya (Italy) Verena Meliss
March 2	Sharm El Sheikh, Egypt; Hard; W15; Singles and doubles draws	Daria Zelinskaya (Czech Republic) Denisa Žoldáková; 6–1, 6–0	(Egypt) Yasmin Ezzat; Yuliya Hatouka	(China) Ma Ruoxi (Egypt) Yasmin Ezzat	(Chinese Taipei) Tsao Chia-yi (France) Alyssa Reguer; Daria Zelinskaya (Italy) Verena Meliss
March 2	Trois-Rivières, Canada; Hard (i); W15; Singles and doubles draws	(Canada) Ariana Arseneault; 6–0, 5–7, 7–6^{(7–3)}	(United States) Dasha Ivanova	(United States) Thara Gowda (Canada) Ana Grubor	(Czech Republic) Michaela Bayerlová (Canada) Nadia Lagaev (Canada) Alexandra Vagramov (Canada) Anna Tabunshchyk
March 2	Trois-Rivières, Canada; Hard (i); W15; Singles and doubles draws	(United States) Dasha Ivanova (Canada) Alexandra Vagramov; 6–3, 3–6, [10–2]	(United Kingdom) Esther Adeshina (Canada) Ariana Arseneault	(United States) Thara Gowda (Canada) Ana Grubor	(Czech Republic) Michaela Bayerlová (Canada) Nadia Lagaev (Canada) Alexandra Vagramov (Canada) Anna Tabunshchyk
March 2	Huamantla, Mexico; Hard; W15; Singles and doubles draws	(Poland) Gina Feistel; 7–5, 6–1	(Italy) Miriana Tona	(Ecuador) Mell Reasco González (United States) Maya Iyengar	(Mexico) Ana Sofía Sánchez (Colombia) María Herazo (Mexico) Ingrid Carolina Millan Acosta (Venezuela) Sofía Elena Cabezas Domínguez
March 2	Huamantla, Mexico; Hard; W15; Singles and doubles draws	(Venezuela) Sofía Elena Cabezas Domínguez (Italy) Miriana Tona; 6–3, 6–3	(Mexico) Lya Fernández (Curaçao) Sarah Victoria Nita	(Ecuador) Mell Reasco González (United States) Maya Iyengar	(Mexico) Ana Sofía Sánchez (Colombia) María Herazo (Mexico) Ingrid Carolina Millan Acosta (Venezuela) Sofía Elena Cabezas Domínguez
March 9	Shimadzu All Japan Indoor Tennis Championships; Kyoto, Japan; Hard (i); W75; Singles – Doubles	(Japan) Hayu Kinoshita; 7–5, 6–1	(Japan) Ena Shibahara	(China) Ma Yexin (Liechtenstein) Kathinka von Deichmann	(Japan) Haruka Kaji (Japan) Ena Koike (China) Yang Yidi (Japan) Natsumi Kawaguchi
March 9	Shimadzu All Japan Indoor Tennis Championships; Kyoto, Japan; Hard (i); W75; Singles – Doubles	(Belgium) Sofia Costoulas; Sofya Lansere; 6–2, 6–4	(Japan) Hayu Kinoshita (Japan) Sara Saito	(China) Ma Yexin (Liechtenstein) Kathinka von Deichmann	(Japan) Haruka Kaji (Japan) Ena Koike (China) Yang Yidi (Japan) Natsumi Kawaguchi
March 9	Heraklion, Greece; Clay; W50; Singles and doubles draws	(Spain) Irene Burillo; 7–5, 6–2	(Italy) Jennifer Ruggeri	(Spain) Andrea Lázaro García (Bulgaria) Rositsa Dencheva	(Romania) Elena Ruxandra Bertea (Burundi) Sada Nahimana (Czech Republic) Jana Kovačková (Sweden) Kajsa Rinaldo Persson
March 9	Heraklion, Greece; Clay; W50; Singles and doubles draws	(Czech Republic) Alena Kovačková (Czech Republic) Jana Kovačková; 6–4, 6–3	(Bulgaria) Rositsa Dencheva (Italy) Vittoria Paganetti	(Spain) Andrea Lázaro García (Bulgaria) Rositsa Dencheva	(Romania) Elena Ruxandra Bertea (Burundi) Sada Nahimana (Czech Republic) Jana Kovačková (Sweden) Kajsa Rinaldo Persson
March 9	Timaru, New Zealand; Hard; W35; Singles and doubles draws	(Japan) Kisa Yoshioka; 6–2, 6–1	(Australia) Alana Subasic	(Japan) Honoka Kobayashi (Japan) Yuno Kitahara	(United States) Solymar Colling (Australia) Sarah Rokusek (Cyprus) Olga Danilova (Netherlands) Demi Tran
March 9	Timaru, New Zealand; Hard; W35; Singles and doubles draws	(New Zealand) Monique Barry (Australia) Alexandra Osborne; 6–2, 6–2	(Australia) Amy Stevens (Australia) Belle Thompson	(Japan) Honoka Kobayashi (Japan) Yuno Kitahara	(United States) Solymar Colling (Australia) Sarah Rokusek (Cyprus) Olga Danilova (Netherlands) Demi Tran
March 9	Monastir, Tunisia; Hard; W35; Singles and doubles draws	Aliona Falei; 6–4, 6–2	(United States) Hibah Shaikh	(United States) Carolyn Ansari (Spain) Eva Guerrero Álvarez	(China) Tian Jialin (Italy) Arianna Zucchini; Vera Zvonareva (France) Tiphanie Lemaître
March 9	Monastir, Tunisia; Hard; W35; Singles and doubles draws	(Germany) Josy Daems; Milana Zhabrailova; 6–7^{(5–7)}, 6–3, [10–7]	(Poland) Weronika Falkowska (United States) Hibah Shaikh	(United States) Carolyn Ansari (Spain) Eva Guerrero Álvarez	(China) Tian Jialin (Italy) Arianna Zucchini; Vera Zvonareva (France) Tiphanie Lemaître
March 9	Huamantla, Mexico; Hard; W35; Singles and doubles draws	(Ukraine) Valeriya Strakhova; 5–7, 6–1, 6–1	(Italy) Miriana Tona	(Mexico) Jéssica Hinojosa Gómez (Italy) Diletta Cherubini	(Mexico) Ana Sofía Sánchez (Venezuela) Sofía Elena Cabezas Domínguez (United States) Misa Malkin (United States) Haley Giavara
March 9	Huamantla, Mexico; Hard; W35; Singles and doubles draws	(Venezuela) Sofía Elena Cabezas Domínguez (Mexico) Jéssica Hinojosa Gómez; 6–1, 7–6^{(7–5)}	(Mexico) Ingrid Carolina Millan Acosta (Mexico) Paulina Montiel	(Mexico) Jéssica Hinojosa Gómez (Italy) Diletta Cherubini	(Mexico) Ana Sofía Sánchez (Venezuela) Sofía Elena Cabezas Domínguez (United States) Misa Malkin (United States) Haley Giavara
March 9	Maanshan, China; Hard (i); W15; Singles and doubles draws	(South Korea) Jeong Bo-young; 4–6, 6–2, 7–5	(Thailand) Anchisa Chanta	(China) Wang Jiayi; Valeria Savinykh	(China) Lin Yujun (China) Wang Yuhan (China) Zou Ruirui (Japan) Yui Ohwaki
March 9	Maanshan, China; Hard (i); W15; Singles and doubles draws	(Sweden) Tiana Tian Deng (China) Wang Meiling; 2–6, 7–5, [10–8]	(South Korea) Kim Na-ri (China) Ye Qiuyu	(China) Wang Jiayi; Valeria Savinykh	(China) Lin Yujun (China) Wang Yuhan (China) Zou Ruirui (Japan) Yui Ohwaki
March 9	Gonesse, France; Clay (i); W15; Singles and doubles draws	(Spain) María García Cid; 7–5, 6–1	(Canada) Françoise Abanda	(Belgium) Margaux Maquet (Ukraine) Yelyzaveta Kotliar	(Italy) Enola Chiesa (France) Nina Radovanović (France) Lucie Nguyen Tan (France) Laïa Petretic
March 9	Gonesse, France; Clay (i); W15; Singles and doubles draws	(Canada) Françoise Abanda (France) Lucie Nguyen Tan; 6–3, 6–3	(France) Océane Babel (Czech Republic) Amelie Justine Hejtmanek	(Belgium) Margaux Maquet (Ukraine) Yelyzaveta Kotliar	(Italy) Enola Chiesa (France) Nina Radovanović (France) Lucie Nguyen Tan (France) Laïa Petretic
March 9	Sharm El Sheikh, Egypt; Hard; W15; Singles and doubles draws	Ekaterina Tupitsyna; 6–0, 6–7^{(6–8)}, 6–4	(Czech Republic) Denisa Žoldáková	(Romania) Elena-Teodora Cadar (Sweden) Iva Marinkovic	(Italy) Federica Sacco (Chinese Taipei) Tsao Chia-yi (Netherlands) Coco Bosman (Italy) Camilla Zanolini
March 9	Sharm El Sheikh, Egypt; Hard; W15; Singles and doubles draws	(France) Alyssa Réguer; Ekaterina Tupitsyna; 1–6, 7–5, [10–6]	(China) Chen Yiru (China) Ma Ruoxi	(Romania) Elena-Teodora Cadar (Sweden) Iva Marinkovic	(Italy) Federica Sacco (Chinese Taipei) Tsao Chia-yi (Netherlands) Coco Bosman (Italy) Camilla Zanolini
March 9	Victoriaville, Canada; Hard (i); W15; Singles and doubles draws	(United Kingdom) Esther Adeshina; 6–4, 4–6, 6–2	(Canada) Alexandra Vagramov	(United States) Kaya Moe (Hong Kong) Kallista Liu	(Canada) Ariana Arseneault (United Kingdom) Sofia Johnson (United States) Dasha Ivanova (United States) Catherine Rennard
March 9	Victoriaville, Canada; Hard (i); W15; Singles and doubles draws	(United Kingdom) Esther Adeshina (Canada) Alexandra Vagramov; 6–3, 6–3	(United States) Jaedan Brown (United Kingdom) Sofia Johnson	(United States) Kaya Moe (Hong Kong) Kallista Liu	(Canada) Ariana Arseneault (United Kingdom) Sofia Johnson (United States) Dasha Ivanova (United States) Catherine Rennard
March 16	Kōfu International Open; Kōfu, Japan; Hard; W75; Singles and doubles draws	(Belgium) Sofia Costoulas; 7–5, 6–3	(China) Ma Yexin	(Japan) Haruka Kaji (China) You Xiaodi	(Japan) Nao Hibino (Japan) Hayu Kinoshita (Slovakia) Viktória Morvayová (China) Zhu Lin
March 16	Kōfu International Open; Kōfu, Japan; Hard; W75; Singles and doubles draws	(Japan) Momoko Kobori (Japan) Ayano Shimizu; 6–4, 6–4	(China) Dang Yiming (China) You Xiaodi	(Japan) Haruka Kaji (China) You Xiaodi	(Japan) Nao Hibino (Japan) Hayu Kinoshita (Slovakia) Viktória Morvayová (China) Zhu Lin
March 16	Branik Maribor Open; Maribor, Slovenia; Hard (i); W75; Singles and doubles draws	Tatiana Prozorova; 6–3, 6–3	(Belgium) Hanne Vandewinkel	(France) Jessika Ponchet (Czech Republic) Vendula Valdmannová	(Belgium) Jeline Vandromme (Czech Republic) Anna Sisková (Italy) Samira De Stefano (Belgium) Greet Minnen
March 16	Branik Maribor Open; Maribor, Slovenia; Hard (i); W75; Singles and doubles draws	(Germany) Anna-Lena Friedsam (Czech Republic) Gabriela Knutson; 4–6, 6–4, [10–6]	(France) Jessika Ponchet (Czech Republic) Anna Sisková	(France) Jessika Ponchet (Czech Republic) Vendula Valdmannová	(Belgium) Jeline Vandromme (Czech Republic) Anna Sisková (Italy) Samira De Stefano (Belgium) Greet Minnen
March 16	Chihuahua, Mexico; Clay; W50; Singles and doubles draws	(United States) Julieta Pareja; 6–3, 7–6^{(7–5)}	(Canada) Kayla Cross	(Argentina) Jazmín Ortenzi (Argentina) Julia Riera	(Greece) Despina Papamichail (United Kingdom) Ella McDonald (United States) Haley Giavara (Brazil) Carolina Alves
March 16	Chihuahua, Mexico; Clay; W50; Singles and doubles draws	(Venezuela) Sofía Elena Cabezas Domínguez (Argentina) Jazmín Ortenzi; 7–5, 6–0	(Mexico) Victoria Rodríguez (Mexico) Ana Sofía Sánchez	(Argentina) Jazmín Ortenzi (Argentina) Julia Riera	(Greece) Despina Papamichail (United Kingdom) Ella McDonald (United States) Haley Giavara (Brazil) Carolina Alves
March 16	Maanshan, China; Hard (i); W35; Singles and doubles draws	(China) Wang Xiyu; 6–4, 7–5	Kristiana Sidorova	Valeria Savinykh (China) Wang Meiling	Sofya Lansere (South Korea) Park So-hyun (Indonesia) Priska Nugroho; Alevtina Ibragimova
March 16	Maanshan, China; Hard (i); W35; Singles and doubles draws	Daria Egorova; Alevtina Ibragimova; 7–6^{(7–3)}, 3–6, [10–6]	Varvara Panshina (China) Wang Jiaqi	Valeria Savinykh (China) Wang Meiling	Sofya Lansere (South Korea) Park So-hyun (Indonesia) Priska Nugroho; Alevtina Ibragimova
March 16	Sabadell, Spain; Clay; W35; Singles and doubles draws	(Ukraine) Katarina Zavatska; 6–3, 6–0	(Greece) Martha Matoula	(Spain) Lucía Cortez Llorca (Sweden) Caijsa Hennemann	Elena Pridankina (Sweden) Lisa Zaar (Spain) María García Cid (Spain) Neus Torner Sensano
March 16	Sabadell, Spain; Clay; W35; Singles and doubles draws	(Spain) Aliona Bolsova (Spain) Ángela Fita Boluda; 6–4, 6–1	(Spain) Lucía Cortez Llorca (Spain) Alicia Herrero Liñana	(Spain) Lucía Cortez Llorca (Sweden) Caijsa Hennemann	Elena Pridankina (Sweden) Lisa Zaar (Spain) María García Cid (Spain) Neus Torner Sensano
March 16	San Gregorio, Italy; Clay; W35; Singles and doubles draws	(Italy) Lisa Pigato; 6–2, 6–4	(France) Alice Tubello	(Italy) Alessandra Mazzola (Italy) Jennifer Ruggeri	(Brazil) Gabriela Cé (Italy) Vittoria Paganetti (Ukraine) Anastasiia Sobolieva (Spain) Charo Esquiva Bañuls
March 16	San Gregorio, Italy; Clay; W35; Singles and doubles draws	(Czech Republic) Aneta Kučmová (Greece) Sapfo Sakellaridi; 6–2, 4–6, [10–6]	(Spain) Yvonne Cavallé Reimers (Italy) Aurora Zantedeschi	(Italy) Alessandra Mazzola (Italy) Jennifer Ruggeri	(Brazil) Gabriela Cé (Italy) Vittoria Paganetti (Ukraine) Anastasiia Sobolieva (Spain) Charo Esquiva Bañuls
March 16	Wodonga, Australia; Grass; W15; Singles and doubles draws	(South Korea) Lee Ha-eum; 6–3, 6–4	(Australia) Ashleigh Simes	(Australia) Sarah Rokusek (South Korea) Moon Jeong	(Cyprus) Olga Danilova (Australia) Jasmine Adams (Australia) Amy Stevens (Japan) Nanari Katsumi
March 16	Wodonga, Australia; Grass; W15; Singles and doubles draws	(Australia) Amy Stevens (Australia) Belle Thompson; 6–4, 7–6^{(7–5)}	(Japan) Natsuho Arakawa (Japan) Nanari Katsumi	(Australia) Sarah Rokusek (South Korea) Moon Jeong	(Cyprus) Olga Danilova (Australia) Jasmine Adams (Australia) Amy Stevens (Japan) Nanari Katsumi
March 16	Le Havre, France; Clay (i); W15; Singles and doubles draws	(Ukraine) Yelyzaveta Kotliar; 6–3, 7–5	(France) Nina Radovanović	(Italy) Enola Chiesa (Ukraine) Anastasiia Firman	(Netherlands) Rikke de Koning (France) Sarah Iliev (France) Lucie Nguyen Tan (France) Hajar Crinebouch
March 16	Le Havre, France; Clay (i); W15; Singles and doubles draws	(Italy) Enola Chiesa (Italy) Camilla Gennaro; 7–6^{(7–5)}, 6–4	(France) Océane Babel (Czech Republic) Amelie Justine Hejtmanek	(Italy) Enola Chiesa (Ukraine) Anastasiia Firman	(Netherlands) Rikke de Koning (France) Sarah Iliev (France) Lucie Nguyen Tan (France) Hajar Crinebouch
March 16	Sharm El Sheikh, Egypt; Hard; W15; Singles and doubles draws	(Egypt) Sandra Samir; 6–4, 7–5	(Bulgaria) Iva Ivanova	(Netherlands) Stéphanie Visscher (Egypt) Lamis Alhussein Abdel Aziz	(United States) Victoria Mulville (Denmark) Sarafina Olivia Hansen (United States) Ava Hrastar (Germany) Ann Akasha Ceuca
March 16	Sharm El Sheikh, Egypt; Hard; W15; Singles and doubles draws	(United States) Ava Hrastar (United States) Victoria Mulville; 7–6^{(7–5)}, 6–2	(India) Tanisha Kashyap (Estonia) Andrea Roots	(Netherlands) Stéphanie Visscher (Egypt) Lamis Alhussein Abdel Aziz	(United States) Victoria Mulville (Denmark) Sarafina Olivia Hansen (United States) Ava Hrastar (Germany) Ann Akasha Ceuca
March 16	Monastir, Tunisia; Hard; W15; Singles and doubles draws	(United Kingdom) Alicia Dudeney; 6–1, 6–2	(Ukraine) Masha Lazarenko	(Italy) Matilde Mariani (Germany) Josy Daems	(Spain) Marta Soriano Santiago; Milana Zhabrailova (Switzerland) Chelsea Fontenel (United Kingdom) Lois Newberry
March 16	Monastir, Tunisia; Hard; W15; Singles and doubles draws	(New Zealand) Valentina Ivanov (New Zealand) Elyse Tse; 6–3, 7–5	(Germany) Josy Daems; Milana Zhabrailova	(Italy) Matilde Mariani (Germany) Josy Daems	(Spain) Marta Soriano Santiago; Milana Zhabrailova (Switzerland) Chelsea Fontenel (United Kingdom) Lois Newberry
March 16	Santiago, Chile; Clay; W15; Singles and doubles draws	(Argentina) Victoria Bosio; 7–6^{(7–4)}, 4–6, 7–6^{(7–5)}	(Chile) Fernanda Labraña	(Brazil) Ana Candiotto (Argentina) Luciana Moyano	(Germany) Marie Vogt (Argentina) Carla Markus (Spain) Sara Dols (Argentina) María Florencia Urrutia
March 16	Santiago, Chile; Clay; W15; Singles and doubles draws	(Brazil) Ana Candiotto (Chile) Antonia Vergara Rivera; 6–1, 6–3	(Peru) Romina Ccuno (Chile) Fernanda Labraña	(Brazil) Ana Candiotto (Argentina) Luciana Moyano	(Germany) Marie Vogt (Argentina) Carla Markus (Spain) Sara Dols (Argentina) María Florencia Urrutia
March 23	Murska Sobota, Slovenia; Hard (i); W75; Singles and doubles draws	(Ukraine) Daria Snigur; 6–3, 6–2	(Belgium) Greet Minnen	(Czech Republic) Anna Sisková (Czech Republic) Tereza Martincová	(Slovakia) Viktória Hrunčáková (Georgia (country)) Mariam Bolkvadze (Czech Republic) Gabriela Knutson (Italy) Lucrezia Stefanini
March 23	Murska Sobota, Slovenia; Hard (i); W75; Singles and doubles draws	(Czech Republic) Lucie Havlíčková (Czech Republic) Laura Samson; Walkover	(United States) Rasheeda McAdoo (United States) Alana Smith	(Czech Republic) Anna Sisková (Czech Republic) Tereza Martincová	(Slovakia) Viktória Hrunčáková (Georgia (country)) Mariam Bolkvadze (Czech Republic) Gabriela Knutson (Italy) Lucrezia Stefanini
March 23	Maanshan, China; Hard (i); W50; Singles and doubles draws	(China) Wang Xiyu; 6–2, 7–6^{(7–3)}	(China) Guo Hanyu	(Cyprus) Raluca Șerban; Aliona Falei	(Poland) Martyna Kubka; Alevtina Ibragimova (United Kingdom) Harriet Dart (China) Lin Yujun
March 23	Maanshan, China; Hard (i); W50; Singles and doubles draws	Sofya Lansere; Alexandra Shubladze; 7–6^{(8–6)}, 6–2	(Chinese Taipei) Lee Ya-hsin (Hong Kong) Cody Wong	(Cyprus) Raluca Șerban; Aliona Falei	(Poland) Martyna Kubka; Alevtina Ibragimova (United Kingdom) Harriet Dart (China) Lin Yujun
March 23	Open de Seine-et-Marne; Croissy-Beaubourg, France; Hard (i); W50; Singles and doubles draws	(France) Harmony Tan; 6–3, 6–4	(France) Amandine Monnot	(China) Gao Xinyu (Czech Republic) Vendula Valdmannová	(Switzerland) Susan Bandecchi (Belgium) Jeline Vandromme (Liechtenstein) Kathinka von Deichmann (Malta) Francesca Curmi
March 23	Open de Seine-et-Marne; Croissy-Beaubourg, France; Hard (i); W50; Singles and doubles draws	(United Kingdom) Mika Stojsavljevic (Czech Republic) Vendula Valdmannová; 7–6^{(7–4)}, 4–6, [10–4]	(United Kingdom) Madeleine Brooks (United Kingdom) Amelia Rajecki	(China) Gao Xinyu (Czech Republic) Vendula Valdmannová	(Switzerland) Susan Bandecchi (Belgium) Jeline Vandromme (Liechtenstein) Kathinka von Deichmann (Malta) Francesca Curmi
March 23	San Gregorio, Italy; Clay; W35; Singles and doubles draws	(France) Alice Tubello; 6–2, 6–3	(Spain) Ángela Fita Boluda	(Spain) Carlota Martínez Círez (Ukraine) Anastasiia Sobolieva	(France) Alice Ramé (Greece) Sapfo Sakellaridi (Italy) Gaia Maduzzi (Sweden) Lisa Zaar
March 23	San Gregorio, Italy; Clay; W35; Singles and doubles draws	(France) Jenny Lim (France) Margaux Rouvroy; 6–4, 2–6, [10–7]	(Germany) Joëlle Steur (Slovakia) Nina Vargová	(Spain) Carlota Martínez Círez (Ukraine) Anastasiia Sobolieva	(France) Alice Ramé (Greece) Sapfo Sakellaridi (Italy) Gaia Maduzzi (Sweden) Lisa Zaar
March 23	Junin, Argentina; Clay; W35; Singles and doubles draws	(Argentina) Luisina Giovannini; 7–6^{(7–3)}, 6–2	(Argentina) Martina Capurro Taborda	(Argentina) María Florencia Urrutia (Poland) Gina Feistel	(Ecuador) Mell Reasco González (Brazil) Luiza Fullana (Argentina) Victoria Bosio (Brazil) Carolina Alves
March 23	Junin, Argentina; Clay; W35; Singles and doubles draws	(Argentina) Martina Capurro Taborda (Poland) Gina Feistel; 7–5, 6–3	(Argentina) Luisina Giovannini (Mexico) Marian Gómez Pezuela Cano	(Argentina) María Florencia Urrutia (Poland) Gina Feistel	(Ecuador) Mell Reasco González (Brazil) Luiza Fullana (Argentina) Victoria Bosio (Brazil) Carolina Alves
March 23	Swan Hill, Australia; Grass; W15; Singles and doubles draws	(Australia) Ashleigh Simes; 6–4, 6–1	(Cyprus) Olga Danilova	(Australia) Alana Subasic (Australia) Belle Thompson	(Australia) Alicia Smith (South Korea) Lee Ha–eum (Japan) Natsuho Arakawa (Australia) Amy Stevens
March 23	Swan Hill, Australia; Grass; W15; Singles and doubles draws	(Japan) Natsuho Arakawa (Japan) Nanari Katsumi; 7–6^{(7–5)}, 6–2	(Australia) Rianna Alame (Australia) Elizabeth Ivanov	(Australia) Alana Subasic (Australia) Belle Thompson	(Australia) Alicia Smith (South Korea) Lee Ha–eum (Japan) Natsuho Arakawa (Australia) Amy Stevens
March 23	Nagpur, India; Clay; W15; Singles and doubles draws	(Kazakhstan) Zhibek Kulambayeva; 6–1, 6–3	(India) Sonal Patil	Elina Nepliy (India) Zeel Desai	(India) Vaishnavi Adkar (India) Kashish Bhatia (Germany) Anastasia Kuparev; Ekaterina Yashina
March 23	Nagpur, India; Clay; W15; Singles and doubles draws	(Kazakhstan) Zhibek Kulambayeva; Ekaterina Yashina; 5–7, 6–4, [10–6]	Ksenia Laskutova; Elina Nepliy	Elina Nepliy (India) Zeel Desai	(India) Vaishnavi Adkar (India) Kashish Bhatia (Germany) Anastasia Kuparev; Ekaterina Yashina
March 23	Sharm El Sheikh, Egypt; Hard; W15; Singles and doubles draws	(Germany) Selina Dal; 6–2, 6–4	Victoria Milovanova	(United States) Ava Hrastar (Kosovo) Arlinda Rushiti	(Egypt) Sandra Samir (Egypt) Lamis Alhussein Abdel Aziz (Austria) Mavie Österreicher (Bulgaria) Isabella Shinikova
March 23	Sharm El Sheikh, Egypt; Hard; W15; Singles and doubles draws	(United States) Ava Hrastar (United States) Victoria Mulville; 6–2, 6–2	Kristina Belkova; Polina Koneva	(United States) Ava Hrastar (Kosovo) Arlinda Rushiti	(Egypt) Sandra Samir (Egypt) Lamis Alhussein Abdel Aziz (Austria) Mavie Österreicher (Bulgaria) Isabella Shinikova
March 23	Monastir, Tunisia; Hard; W15; Singles and doubles draws	(United Kingdom) Alicia Dudeney; 7–6^{(7–4)}, 7–6^{(8–6)}	(United States) Malaika Rapolu	Milana Zhabrailova (Serbia) Elena Milovanović	(United Kingdom) Esther Adeshina (Germany) Mara Guth (Spain) Lorena Solar Donoso (United States) Julia Adams
March 23	Monastir, Tunisia; Hard; W15; Singles and doubles draws	Yuliya Hatouka; Milana Zhabrailova; 6–2, 6–4	(United States) Julia Adams (Ukraine) Daria Yesypchuk	Milana Zhabrailova (Serbia) Elena Milovanović	(United Kingdom) Esther Adeshina (Germany) Mara Guth (Spain) Lorena Solar Donoso (United States) Julia Adams
March 23	Santiago, Chile; Clay; W15; Singles and doubles draws	(Argentina) Luciana Moyano; 6–4, 4–6, 6–1	(Spain) Sara Dols	(Chile) Antonia Vergara Rivera (Chile) Fernanda Labraña	(Brazil) Victória Luiza Barros (Brazil) Marjorie Souza (Chile) Jimar Gerald González (Brazil) Júlia Konishi Camargo Silva
March 23	Santiago, Chile; Clay; W15; Singles and doubles draws	(Argentina) Luciana Moyano (Chile) Antonia Vergara Rivera; 3–6, 6–0, [10–6]	(Peru) Romina Ccuno (Chile) Fernanda Labraña	(Chile) Antonia Vergara Rivera (Chile) Fernanda Labraña	(Brazil) Victória Luiza Barros (Brazil) Marjorie Souza (Chile) Jimar Gerald González (Brazil) Júlia Konishi Camargo Silva
March 30	Jin'an Open; Lu'an, China; Hard; W100; Singles and doubles draws	(China) You Xiaodi; 6–4, 6–7^{(2–7)}, 6–4	Sofya Lansere	(China) Wang Xiyu (China) Ren Yufei	(United Kingdom) Harriet Dart; Alexandra Shubladze (Australia) Taylah Preston; Aliona Falei
March 30	Jin'an Open; Lu'an, China; Hard; W100; Singles and doubles draws	Ekaterina Ovcharenko; Varvara Panshina; 6–2, 6–2	(Indonesia) Priska Nugroho (Australia) Alexandra Osborne	(China) Wang Xiyu (China) Ren Yufei	(United Kingdom) Harriet Dart; Alexandra Shubladze (Australia) Taylah Preston; Aliona Falei
March 30	Engie Open Nantes Atlantique; Nantes, France; Hard (i); W50; Singles and doubles draws	(Belgium) Jeline Vandromme; 3–2 ret.	(Germany) Mona Barthel	Ekaterina Kazionova (United States) Vivian Wolff	(Bulgaria) Lidia Encheva (France) Harmony Tan (Turkey) Ayla Aksu (Bulgaria) Elizara Yaneva
March 30	Engie Open Nantes Atlantique; Nantes, France; Hard (i); W50; Singles and doubles draws	Kira Pavlova; Elena Pridankina; 6–4, 6–3	(France) Tiphanie Lemaître (Ukraine) Veronika Podrez	Ekaterina Kazionova (United States) Vivian Wolff	(Bulgaria) Lidia Encheva (France) Harmony Tan (Turkey) Ayla Aksu (Bulgaria) Elizara Yaneva
March 30	Santa Margherita di Pula, Italy; Clay; W35; Singles and doubles draws	(Bulgaria) Rositsa Dencheva; 6–0, 6–3	(France) Alice Ramé	(Ukraine) Anastasiia Sobolieva (Czech Republic) Alena Kovačková	(Romania) Briana Szabó (Italy) Giorgia Pedone (Italy) Martina Trevisan (Sweden) Lisa Zaar
March 30	Santa Margherita di Pula, Italy; Clay; W35; Singles and doubles draws	(Italy) Enola Chiesa (Latvia) Beatrise Zeltiņa; 6–4, 6–7^{(3–7)}, [10–7]	(Italy) Tyra Caterina Grant (Italy) Jennifer Ruggeri	(Ukraine) Anastasiia Sobolieva (Czech Republic) Alena Kovačková	(Romania) Briana Szabó (Italy) Giorgia Pedone (Italy) Martina Trevisan (Sweden) Lisa Zaar
March 30	Jackson, United States; Clay; W35; Singles and doubles draws	(United Kingdom) Sofia Johnson; 7–5, 6–1	(Spain) Aran Teixidó García	(Japan) Mio Mushika (United States) Victoria Hu	(United States) Savannah Broadus; Daria Egorova (United States) Kylie Collins (Belgium) Amélie van Impe
March 30	Jackson, United States; Clay; W35; Singles and doubles draws	(United States) Kailey Evans (Japan) Mio Mushika; 7–6^{(7–5)}, 2–6, [12–10]	(United States) Kylie Collins (United States) Carson Tanguilig	(Japan) Mio Mushika (United States) Victoria Hu	(United States) Savannah Broadus; Daria Egorova (United States) Kylie Collins (Belgium) Amélie van Impe
March 30	Junin, Argentina; Clay; W35; Singles and doubles draws	(Argentina) Luisina Giovannini; 6–4, 7–5	(Argentina) Martina Capurro Taborda	(United States) Madison Sieg (Bulgaria) Gergana Topalova	(Mexico) Victoria Rodríguez (Argentina) María Florencia Urrutia (Argentina) Victoria Bosio (Argentina) Carla Markus
March 30	Junin, Argentina; Clay; W35; Singles and doubles draws	(Argentina) Luciana Moyano (Ecuador) Camila Romero; 7–5, 6–3	(United States) Isabella Barrera Aguirre (Argentina) Justina María González Daniele	(United States) Madison Sieg (Bulgaria) Gergana Topalova	(Mexico) Victoria Rodríguez (Argentina) María Florencia Urrutia (Argentina) Victoria Bosio (Argentina) Carla Markus
March 30	Ch. Sambhaji Nagar, India; Clay; W15; Singles and doubles draws	Elina Nepliy; 6–2, 6–1	(Bosnia and Herzegovina) Tea Kovačević	(Kazakhstan) Zhibek Kulambayeva (India) Zeel Desai	(India) Madhurima Sawant (Denmark) Elena Jamshidi; Ksenia Laskutova (India) Jennifer Luikham
March 30	Ch. Sambhaji Nagar, India; Clay; W15; Singles and doubles draws	(Kazakhstan) Zhibek Kulambayeva; Ekaterina Yashina; 6–1, 6–4	(Germany) Anastasia Kuparev (Uzbekistan) Sevil Yuldasheva	(Kazakhstan) Zhibek Kulambayeva (India) Zeel Desai	(India) Madhurima Sawant (Denmark) Elena Jamshidi; Ksenia Laskutova (India) Jennifer Luikham
March 30	Sharm El Sheikh, Egypt; Hard; W15; Singles and doubles draws	(Czech Republic) Anna Sisková; 6–1, 7–5	Kristina Kroitor	Maria Golovina (Bulgaria) Isabella Shinikova	Valeriia Artemeva (Italy) Federica Sacco (Croatia) Karla Popović; Victoria Milovanova
March 30	Sharm El Sheikh, Egypt; Hard; W15; Singles and doubles draws	(Netherlands) Coco Bosman (Croatia) Karla Popović; 7–6^{(7–2)}, 6–4	(Ukraine) Kateryna Diatlova (Turkey) Doğa Türkmen	Maria Golovina (Bulgaria) Isabella Shinikova	Valeriia Artemeva (Italy) Federica Sacco (Croatia) Karla Popović; Victoria Milovanova
March 30	Monastir, Tunisia; Hard; W15; Singles and doubles draws	(Germany) Mara Guth; 6–3, 6–1	Yuliya Hatouka	(New Zealand) Valentina Ivanov (Italy) Angelica Raggi	(Poland) Monika Stankiewicz (United Kingdom) Eliz Maloney (United States) Malaika Rapolu (United States) Shannon Lam
March 30	Monastir, Tunisia; Hard; W15; Singles and doubles draws	(Serbia) Elena Milovanović (Netherlands) Sarah van Emst; 6–2, 7–5	Yuliya Hatouka; Anna Kubareva	(New Zealand) Valentina Ivanov (Italy) Angelica Raggi	(Poland) Monika Stankiewicz (United Kingdom) Eliz Maloney (United States) Malaika Rapolu (United States) Shannon Lam
