= 2026 Engie Open Andrézieux-Bouthéon 42 – Singles =

Singles
- 2026 Engie Open Andrézieux-Bouthéon 42

Final
- Champion: Julia Avdeeva
- Runner-up: (Ukraine) Veronika Podrez
- Score: 6–3, 7–5

Events
Singles	Doubles
- Open Andrézieux-Bouthéon 42

Manon Léonard was the defending champion, but lost in the quarterfinals to Veronika Podrez.

Julia Avdeeva won the title, defeating Podrez 6–3, 7–5 in the final.

== Seeds ==
1. (France) Alice Ramé (first round)
2. (France) Manon Léonard (quarterfinals)
3. (Lithuania) Justina Mikulskytė (first round)
4. (Burundi) Sada Nahimana (first round)
5. (Liechtenstein) Kathinka von Deichmann (second round)
6. (France) Julie Belgraver (second round)
7. (Spain) Nuria Párrizas Díaz (first round)
8. (Serbia) Mia Ristić (first round)

== Draw ==
Key

- Q = Qualifier
- WC = Wild card
- LL = Lucky loser
- Alt = Alternate
- ITF = ITF entry
- PR = Protected ranking
- SR = Special ranking
- SE = Special exempt
- JE = Junior exempt
- JR = Junior Accelerator Programme entrant
- CO = College Accelerator Programme entrant
- NG = Next Gen Accelerator Program entrant
- w/o = Walkover
- r = Retired
- d = Defaulted

=== Finals ===
Semifinals
Julia Avdeeva	7	7
Q	(China) Li Zongyu	5	5
(France) Amandine Monnot	6^{0}	6	4
(Ukraine) Veronika Podrez	7^{7}	2	6

Final
Julia Avdeeva	6	7
(Ukraine) Veronika Podrez	3	5

=== Top half ===
First round
1	(France) A Ramé	3	1
WC	(France) N Berecoechea	6	6
(France) A Lew Yan Foon	3	2
(Netherlands) A Vrancken Peeters	6	6
J Avdeeva	6	6
(France) A Tubello	4	3
(Italy) S De Stefano	6^{7}	4
5	(Liechtenstein) K von Deichmann	7^{9}	6
3	(Lithuania) J Mikulskytė	6	4	3
(Brazil) G Cé	1	6	6
Q	(China) Z Li	6	6
Q	(France) D Martynov	4	2
Q	(China) X Yao	6	6
(Spain) G García Pérez	4	4
Q	(France) M Szostak	4	4
6	(France) J Belgraver	6	6

Second round
WC	(France) N Berecoechea	6	1	3
(Netherlands) A Vrancken Peeters	3	6	6
J Avdeeva	0	6	7^{9}
5	(Liechtenstein) K von Deichmann	6	2	6^{7}
(Brazil) G Cé	0	6^{4}
Q	(China) Z Li	6	7^{7}
Q	(China) X Yao	6	3	6
6	(France) J Belgraver	4	6	3

Quarterfinals
(Netherlands) A Vrancken Peeters	6	1	3
J Avdeeva	4	6	6
Q	' (China) Z Li	6	3	7^{8}
Q	(China) X Yao	1	6	6^{6}

Semifinals
J Avdeeva	7	7
Q	(China) Z Li	5	5

=== Bottom half ===
First round
8	(Serbia) M Ristić	6	3	4
(France) M Rouvroy	2	6	6
(France) A Monnot	6^{3}	6	6
WC	(France) D Mpetshi Perricard	7^{7}	3	2
(China) Y Yang	6	6
Q	(Italy) D Chiesa	3	4
Q	(France) A Cirotte	6	6
4	(Burundi) S Nahimana	2	3
7	(Spain) N Párrizas Díaz	5	6	5
E Kazionova	7	4	7
(Ukraine) V Podrez	6	6
(France) T Lemaître	2	3
Q	(Ukraine) A Firman	7^{7}	4	2
(Belgium) J Vandromme	6^{5}	6	6
Q	(France) O Babel	6	3	3
2	(France) M Léonard	3	6	6

Second round
(France) M Rouvroy	4	0
(France) A Monnot	6	6
(China) Y Yang	6	6
Q	(France) A Cirotte	2	3
E Kazionova	0	4
(Ukraine) V Podrez	6	6
(Belgium) J Vandromme	4	1
2	(France) M Léonard	6	6

Quarterfinals
(France) A Monnot	5	6	6
(China) Y Yang	7	4	2
(Ukraine) V Podrez	6^{4}	6	7^{7}
2	(France) M Léonard	7^{7}	4	6^{5}

Semifinals
(France) A Monnot	6^{0}	6	4
(Ukraine) V Podrez	7^{7}	2	6
