= 2026 Engie Open Andrézieux-Bouthéon 42 – Doubles =

Doubles
- 2026 Engie Open Andrézieux-Bouthéon 42

Final
- Champions: (France) Julie Belgraver (Belgium) Lara Salden
- Runners-up: (Chinese Taipei) Li Yu-yun (China) Li Zongyu
- Score: 6–4, 3–6, [10–5]

Events
Singles	Doubles
- Open Andrézieux-Bouthéon 42

Ayla Aksu and Yuliya Hatouka were the defending champions but chose not to participate.

Julie Belgraver and Lara Salden won the title, defeating Li Yu-yun and Li Zongyu 6–4, 3–6, [10–5] in the final.

== Seeds ==
1. (Chinese Taipei) Li Yu-yun / (China) Li Zongyu (final)
2. (France) Tiphanie Lemaître / (Burundi) Sada Nahimana (semifinals)
3. (Czech Republic) Michaela Bayerlová / (Croatia) Mariana Dražić (first round)
4. (United Kingdom) Holly Hutchinson / (France) Alice Robbe (first round)

== Draw ==
Key

- Q = Qualifier
- WC = Wild card
- LL = Lucky loser
- Alt = Alternate
- ITF = ITF entry
- PR = Protected ranking
- SR = Special ranking
- SE = Special exempt
- JE = Junior exempt
- JR = Junior Accelerator Programme entrant
- CO = College Accelerator Programme entrant
- NG = Next Gen Accelerator Program entrant
- w/o = Walkover
- r = Retired
- d = Defaulted

=== Draw ===
First round
1	(Chinese Taipei) Y-y Li (China) Z Li	6	0	[14]
(France) A Lew Yan Foon (France) L Nguyen Tan	2	6	[12]
(China) Y Yang (China) X Yao	7^{7}	2	[13]
E Kazionova (Netherlands) D Tran	6^{5}	6	[11]
3	(Czech Republic) M Bayerlová (Croatia) M Dražić	1	5
(France) N Berecoechea (France) A Monnot	6	7
(Italy) D Chiesa (Italy) S De Stefano	2	7^{11}	[6]
(France) M Mattel (Ukraine) V Podrez	6	6^{9}	[10]
(France) M Szostak (France) A Tubello
(France) A Cirotte (France) M Lollia	w/o
(France) J Belgraver (Belgium) L Salden	6	6
4	(United Kingdom) H Hutchinson (France) A Robbe	3	0
(Spain) G García Pérez (Poland) U Radwańska	6	6
(France) S Cakarevic (Liechtenstein) K von Deichmann	3	1
(France) O Babel (France) O Lancelot	1	5
2	(France) T Lemaître (Burundi) S Nahimana	6	7

Quarterfinals
1	(Chinese Taipei) Y-y Li (China) Z Li	6	6
(China) Y Yang (China) X Yao	3	0
(France) N Berecoechea (France) A Monnot	6	6
(France) M Mattel (Ukraine) V Podrez	4	3
(France) A Cirotte (France) M Lollia	2	4
(France) J Belgraver (Belgium) L Salden	6	6
(Spain) G García Pérez (Poland) U Radwańska	2	6	[7]
2	(France) T Lemaître (Burundi) S Nahimana	6	3	[10]

Semifinals
1	(Chinese Taipei) Y-y Li (China) Z Li	5	7^{7}	[10]
(France) N Berecoechea (France) A Monnot	7	6^{2}	[7]
(France) J Belgraver (Belgium) L Salden	7^{7}	6
2	(France) T Lemaître (Burundi) S Nahimana	6^{4}	3

Final
1	(Chinese Taipei) Y-y Li (China) Z Li	4	6	[5]
(France) J Belgraver (Belgium) L Salden	6	3	[10]
