= Shi Han =

Chinese tennis player (born 2005)

Shi Han 施晗
- Country (sports): China
- Born: 30 May 2005 (age 21) Jiaxing, Zhejiang
- Plays: Right-handed
- Prize money: $264,265

Singles
- Career record: 177–112
- Career titles: 7 ITF
- Highest ranking: No. 140 (9 November 2026)
- Current ranking: No. 140 (9 November 2026)

Grand Slam singles results
- Australian Open: Q1 (2025)
- French Open: Q1 (2025)

Doubles
- Career record: 69–75
- Career titles: 3 ITF
- Highest ranking: No. 213 (13 July 2026)
- Current ranking: No. 235 (19 October 2026)
- Last updated on: 9 November 2026.

Shi Han (Chinese: 施晗; pinyin: Shī Hán born 30 May 2005) is a female Chinese professional tennis player. Shi has a career-high singles ranking by the WTA of No. 140, achieved on 9 November 2026, and a highest doubles ranking of No. 213, reached on 13 July 2026.

== Career ==
Shi won her first W50 title in May 2024 at the Kunming Open in China.

She received a wildcard for the main draw of the 2024 China Open making her WTA Tour debut, losing to Moyuka Uchijima in the first round.

Ranked No. 254 at the 2024 Guangzhou Open, Shi recorded her first WTA Tour win as a wildcard player over qualifier Jessika Ponchet, before losing to Jéssica Bouzas Maneiro in the second round.

Having qualified for the 2026 Wuhan Open, she achieved her maiden win over a top 20 ranked player, defeating world No. 19, Alexandra Eala, to reach the second round of a WTA 1000 event for the first time, at which point her run was ended by Leylah Fernandez.

== ITF Circuit finals ==
=== Singles: 11 (7 titles, 4 runner-ups) ===
Legend W40/50 tournaments (4–1) W35 tournaments (1–2) W15 tournaments (2–1)	Finals by surface Hard (6–4) Clay (1–0)

Result	W–L	Date	Tournament	Tier	Surface	Opponent	Score
Loss	0–1	Jun 2023	ITF Tianjin, China	W15	Hard	(China) Zheng Wushuang	3–6, 2–6
Loss	0–2	Oct 2023	ITF Shenzhen, China	W40	Hard	(Thailand) Thasaporn Naklo	3–6, 5–7
Win	1–2	May 2024	Kunming Open, China	W50	Clay	(China) Li Zongyu	6–4, 6–3
Win	2–2	Jun 2024	Taizhou, China	W50	Hard	(China) Lu Jiajing	2–6, 7–5, 6–2
Win	3–2	Aug 2024	ITF Kunshan, China	W35	Hard	(Hong Kong) Cody Wong	6–0, 7–5
Loss	3–3	Jul 2025	ITF Roehampton, United Kingdom	W35	Hard	(Belgium) Jeline Vandromme	6–7^{(4)}, 7–5, 5–7
Win	4–3	Jan 2026	ITF Monastir, Tunisia	W50	Hard	(Spain) Marina Bassols Ribera	4–6, 6–2, 6–4
Win	5–3	Feb 2026	ITF Monastir, Tunisia	W15	Hard	(Greece) Sapfo Sakellaridi	6–4, 6–2
Loss	5–4	Apr 2026	ITF Luzhou, China	W35	Hard	(China) Bai Zhuoxuan	4–6, 6–0, 1–6
Win	6–4	Jun 2026	ITF Elvas, Portugal	W50	Hard	(Portugal) Matilde Jorge	6–1, 6–1
Win	7–4	Aug 2026	ITF Tianjin, China	W15	Hard	(China) Han Jiangxue	6–3, 6–1

=== Doubles: 5 (3 titles, 2 runner-ups) ===
Legend W75 tournaments W50 tournaments W35 tournaments W15 tournaments	Finals by surface Hard (3–2)

Result	W–L	Date	Tournament	Tier	Surface	Partner	Opponents	Score
Win	1–0	Jul 2023	ITF Tianjin, China	W15	Hard	(China) Ren Yufei	(China) Cao Yajing (China) Huang Yujia	6–1, 6–3
Loss	1–1	Jun 2024	ITF Changwon, Korea	W35	Hard	(China) Li Zongyu	(New Zealand) Paige Hourigan (Japan) Erika Sema	4–6, 6–4, [4–10]
Loss	1–2	Sep 2024	ITF Guiyang, China	W50	Hard	(China) Li Zongyu	(China) Feng Shuo (China) Ye Qiuyu	6–7^{(3)}, 3–6
Win	2–2	Jul 2025	Open Araba en Femenino, Spain	W75	Hard	(Norway) Malene Helgø	(France) Nahia Berecoechea (Bulgaria) Isabella Shinikova	6–3, 6–3
Win	3–2	Jun 2026	ITF Elvas, Portugal	W50	Hard	(Australia) Elena Micic	(India) Vaishnavi Adkar (India) Rutuja Bhosale	6–4, 6–3
