= Ren Yufei =

Chinese tennis player (born 2006)

- Country (sports): China
- Born: 11 April 2006 (age 20)
- Plays: Right-handed (two-handed backhand)
- Prize money: $139,830

Singles
- Career record: 146–88
- Career titles: 5 ITF
- Highest ranking: No. 285 (26 October 2026)
- Current ranking: No. 285 (2 November 2026)

Doubles
- Career record: 45–45
- Career titles: 4 ITF
- Highest ranking: No. 452 (14 September 2026)
- Current ranking: No. 465 (26 October 2026)
- Last updated on: 26 October 2026.

Ren Yufei (Chinese: 任钰菲; born 11 April 2006) is a Chinese professional tennis player.

She has career-high rankings of world No. 285 in singles, achieved on 26 October 2026, and No. 452 in doubles, reached in September 2026.

She made her WTA Tour debut as a wildcard entrant at the 2024 China Open, losing to Nadia Podoroska in the first round.

== ITF Circuit finals ==
=== Singles: 13 (5 titles, 8 runner-ups) ===
Legend W50 tournaments W35 tournaments W15 tournaments	Finals by surface Hard (5–8)

Result	W–L	Date	Tournament	Tier	Surface	Opponent	Score
Loss	0–1	Apr 2023	ITF Singapore,	W15	Hard	(Hong Kong) Wu Ho-ching	6–1, 1–6, 1–6
Win	1–1	May 2023	ITF Monastir, Tunisia	W15	Hard	(United Kingdom) Ranah Stoiber	6–0, 6–3
Win	2–1	Jul 2023	ITF Tianjin, China	W15	Hard	Valery Gynina	6–7^{(5)}, 6–1, 6–0
Loss	2–2	Jul 2023	ITF Tianjin, China	W15	Hard	(China) Yuan Chengyiyi	6–4, 4–6, 4–6
Loss	2–3	Feb 2024	ITF Monastir, Tunisia	W15	Hard	(Czech Republic) Tereza Valentová	3–6, 2–6
Loss	2–4	Apr 2024	ITF Shenzhen, China	W50	Hard	(Thailand) Lanlana Tararudee	7–6^{(5)}, 3–6, 2–6
Win	3–4	Apr 2025	ITF Wuning, China	W15	Hard	(China) Lu Jingjing	6–2, 6–4
Loss	3–5	Aug 2025	ITF Lu'an, China	W15	Hard	(China) Chen Mengyi	2–6, 6–3, 4–6
Win	4–5	Jan 2026	ITF Sharm El Sheikh, Egypt	W15	Hard	(Bulgaria) Isabella Shinikova	6–7^{(2)}, 7–5, 6–0
Win	5–5	Feb 2026	ITF Sharm El Sheikh, Egypt	W15	Hard	(China) Liu Yuhan	6–1, 6–3
Loss	5–6	Jun 2026	ITF Wuning, China	W50	Hard	(China) Yao Xinxin	4–6, 4–6
Loss	5–7	Aug 2026	ITF Vigo, Spain	W35	Hard	(Kazakhstan) Sonja Zhiyenbayeva	6–7^{(6)}, 5–7
Loss	5–8	Sep 2026	ITF Guiyang, China	W50	Hard	Alexandra Shubladze	2–6, 3–6

=== Doubles: 7 (4 titles, 3 runner-ups) ===
Legend
W35 tournaments
W15 tournaments

Result	W–L	Date	Tournament	Tier	Surface	Partner	Opponents	Score
Win	1–0	Apr 2023	ITF Singapur	W15	Hard	(China) Liu Yanni	(China) Guo Meiqi (Chinese Taipei) Lin Li-hsin	6–1, 7–5
Win	2–0	Jul 2023	ITF Tianjin, China	W15	Hard	(China) Shi Han	(China) Cao Yajing (China) Huang Yujia	6–1, 6–3
Loss	2–1	Apr 2025	ITF Wuning, China	W15	Hard	(Slovakia) Viktória Morvayová	(South Korea) Kim Na-ri (China) Ye Qiuyu	2–6, 5–7
Loss	2–2	Dec 2025	ITF Nairobi, Kenya	W35	Clay	(France) Alyssa Réguer	(Kenya) Angella Okutoyi (Poland) Zuzanna Pawlikowska	2–6, 5–7
Loss	2–3	Jan 2026	ITF Nairobi, Kenya	W35	Clay	(France) Alyssa Réguer	(Kenya) Angella Okutoyi (Netherlands) Demi Tran	2–6, 7–5, [4–10]
Win	3–3	Jan 2026	ITF Sharm El Sheikh, Egypt	W15	Hard	(Egypt) Lamis Abdel Aziz	(China) Chen Mengyi (China) Wang Meiling	7–6^{(4)}, 6–2
Win	4–3	Feb 2026	ITF Sharm El Sheikh, Egypt	W15	Hard	(Egypt) Lamis Abdel Aziz	(China) Liu Yuhan (China) Wang Meiling	4–6, 7–6^{(3)}, [10–5]
