= 2026 Engie Open Andrézieux-Bouthéon 42 =

Tennis tournament

- Date: 2–8 February 2026
- Edition: 16th
- Category: ITF Women's World Tennis Tour
- Prize money: $60,000
- Surface: Hard / Indoor
- Location: Andrézieux-Bouthéon, France

2025 Champions

Singles
- (France) Manon Léonard

Doubles
- (Turkey) Ayla Aksu / Yuliya Hatouka
- Open Andrézieux-Bouthéon 42

The 2026 Engie Open Andrézieux-Bouthéon 42 was a professional tennis tournament played on indoor hard courts. It was the sixteenth edition of the tournament which was part of the 2026 ITF Women's World Tennis Tour. It took place in Andrézieux-Bouthéon, France between 2 and 8 February 2026.

== Champions ==
=== Singles ===
- Julia Avdeeva vs. (Ukraine) Veronika Podrez

=== Doubles ===
- (France) Julie Belgraver / (Belgium) Lara Salden def. (Chinese Taipei) Li Yu-yun / (China) Li Zongyu 6–4, 3–6, [10–5]

== Singles main-draw entrants ==
=== Seeds ===
Country	Player	Rank^{1}	Seed
FRA	Alice Ramé	195	1
FRA	Manon Léonard	203	2
LTU	Justina Mikulskytė	217	3
BDI	Sada Nahimana	219	4
LIE	Kathinka von Deichmann	258	5
FRA	Julie Belgraver	259	6
ESP	Nuria Párrizas Díaz	261	7
SRB	Mia Ristić	268	8

- ^{1} Rankings are as of 19 January 2026.

=== Other entrants ===
The following players received wildcards into the singles main draw:

- (France) Nahia Berecoechea
- (France) Daphnée Mpetshi Perricard

The following players received entry from the qualifying draw:

- (France) Océane Babel
- (Italy) Deborah Chiesa
- (France) Astrid Cirotte
- (Ukraine) Anastasiia Firman
- (China) Li Zongyu
- (France) Diana Martynov
- (France) Marine Szostak
- (China) Yao Xinxin
