= 2026 ITF Fujairah Championships – Singles =

Singles
- 2026 ITF Fujairah Championships

Final
- Champion: (Austria) Lilli Tagger
- Runner-up: (United Kingdom) Harriet Dart
- Score: 6–4, 6–2

Events
Singles	Doubles
- ITF Fujairah Championships

Petra Marčinko was the defending champion but chose not to participate.

Lilli Tagger won the title, defeating Harriet Dart 6–4, 6–2 in the final.

== Seeds ==
1. (Mexico) Renata Zarazúa (semifinals, retired)
2. (France) Diane Parry (quarterfinals)
3. (Austria) Lilli Tagger (champion)
4. Polina Iatcenko (first round)
5. (France) Jessika Ponchet (withdrew)
6. (Georgia (country)) Ekaterine Gorgodze (first round)
7. (United Kingdom) Harriet Dart (final)
8. (France) Carole Monnet (first round)

== Draw ==
Key

- Q = Qualifier
- WC = Wild card
- LL = Lucky loser
- Alt = Alternate
- ITF = ITF entry
- PR = Protected ranking
- SR = Special ranking
- SE = Special exempt
- JE = Junior exempt
- JR = Junior Accelerator Programme entrant
- CO = College Accelerator Programme entrant
- NG = Next Gen Accelerator Program entrant
- w/o = Walkover
- r = Retired
- d = Defaulted

=== Finals ===
Semifinals
1	(Mexico) Renata Zarazúa	2	0^{r}
3	(Austria) Lilli Tagger	6	3
Alina Korneeva	4	4
7	(United Kingdom) Harriet Dart	6	6

Final
3	(Austria) Lilli Tagger	6	6
7	(United Kingdom) Harriet Dart	4	2

=== Top half ===
First round
1	(Mexico) R Zarazúa	6	6^{4}	6
Q	(Germany) M Hodzic	4	7^{7}	1
(Italy) C Rosatello	0	2
E Pridankina	6	6
(China) W Zheng	6	5	5
(Australia) Ar Rodionova	3	7	7
Q	J Kolodynska	6	6
LL	K Kroitor	4	2
3	(Austria) L Tagger	6	6
(Serbia) T Kostović	1	1
Q	K Sidorova	3	3
(France) C Paquet	6	6
Q	V Panshina	6	1	6
Q	(United States) J DeFalco	0	6	1
(Slovakia) V Hrunčáková	6	6
6	(Georgia (country)) E Gorgodze	2	2

Second round
1	(Mexico) R Zarazúa	6	3	6
E Pridankina	4	6	2
(Australia) Ar Rodionova	6	5	7^{7}
Q	J Kolodynska	4	7	6^{5}
3	(Austria) L Tagger	6	6
(France) C Paquet	2	4
Q	V Panshina	2	1
(Slovakia) V Hrunčáková	6	6

Quarterfinals
1	(Mexico) R Zarazúa	6	3
(Australia) Ar Rodionova	3	0^{r}
3	(Austria) L Tagger	7	6
(Slovakia) V Hrunčáková	5	1

Semifinals
1	(Mexico) R Zarazúa	2	0^{r}
3	(Austria) L Tagger	6	3

=== Bottom half ===
First round
8	(France) C Monnet	0	5
A Korneeva	6	7
E Andreeva	6	6
(United Kingdom) M Xu	3	2
Q	A Shubladze	6	6
Q	E Maklakova	1	3
(United States) CYS Lee	6	6
4	P Iatcenko	2	1
7	(United Kingdom) H Dart	6	6
Q	E Ovcharenko	2	1
LL	E Yashina	6	6
WC	A Ibragimova	4	4
WC	(Finland) A Kulikova	6	7^{8}
(Germany) A Schmidt	1	6^{6}
A Tikhonova	3	5
2	(France) D Parry	6	7

Second round
A Korneeva	3	6	7^{7}
E Andreeva	6	1	6^{5}
Q	A Shubladze	4	1
(United States) CYS Lee	6	6
7	(United Kingdom) H Dart	0	6	6
LL	E Yashina	6	3	4
WC	(Finland) A Kulikova	4	4
2	(France) D Parry	6	6

Quarterfinals
A Korneeva	6	6
(United States) CYS Lee	4	2
7	(United Kingdom) H Dart	6	6
2	(France) D Parry	2	1

Semifinals
A Korneeva	4	4
7	(United Kingdom) H Dart	6	6
