= 2026 ITF Fujairah Championships =

Tennis tournament

- Date: 26 January–1 February 2026
- Edition: 2nd
- Category: ITF Women's World Tennis Tour
- Prize money: $100,000
- Surface: Hard / Outdoor
- Location: Fujairah, United Arab Emirates

Champions

Singles
- (Austria) Lilli Tagger

Doubles
- (United Kingdom) Harriet Dart / (United Kingdom) Maia Lumsden
- ITF Fujairah Championships

The 2026 ITF Fujairah Championships is a professional tennis tournament played on outdoor hard courts. It is the second edition of the tournament which is part of the 2026 ITF Women's World Tennis Tour. It took place in Fujairah, United Arab Emirates between 26 January and 1 February 2026. From this year the tournament prize money increased to $100,000 and the tournament moved to end of January.

== Champions ==
=== Singles ===
- (Austria) Lilli Tagger def. (United Kingdom) Harriet Dart, 6–4, 6–2.

=== Doubles ===
- (United Kingdom) Harriet Dart / (United Kingdom) Maia Lumsden def. (Netherlands) Isabelle Haverlag / Elena Pridankina, 6–1, 6–0.

== Singles main draw entrants ==
=== Seeds ===
Country	Player	Rank^{1}	Seed
MEX	Renata Zarazúa	80	1
FRA	Diane Parry	122	2
AUT	Lilli Tagger	155	3
	Polina Iatcenko	159	4
~~FRA~~	~~Jessika Ponchet~~	~~166~~	~~5~~
GEO	Ekaterine Gorgodze	169	6
GBR	Harriet Dart	170	7
FRA	Carole Monnet	175	8

- ^{1} Rankings are as of 19 January 2026.

=== Other entrants ===
The following players received wildcards into the singles main draw:

- Alevtina Ibragimova
- (Finland) Anastasia Kulikova

The following players received entry from the qualifying draw:

- (United States) Jenna DeFalco
- (Germany) Mina Hodzic
- Jana Kolodynska
- Ekaterina Maklakova
- Ekaterina Ovcharenko
- Varvara Panshina
- Alexandra Shubladze
- Kristina Sidorova

The following players received entry as a lucky loser:

- Kristina Kroitor
- Ekaterina Yashina
