= Li Zongyu =

Chinese tennis player (born 2002)

- Country (sports): China
- Born: 27 May 2003 (age 23)
- Turned pro: 2021
- Plays: Right-handed
- Prize money: $129,688

Singles
- Career record: 194–113
- Career titles: 7 ITF
- Highest ranking: No. 288 (22 June 2026)
- Current ranking: No. 303 (24 August 2026)

Doubles
- Career record: 103–60
- Career titles: 9 ITF
- Highest ranking: No. 196 (9 February 2026)
- Current ranking: No. 211 (24 August 2026)
Medal record
Women's tennis
Representing China
World University Games
Bronze medal – third place	2025 Rhine Ruhr	Women's doubles
- Last updated on: 30 August 2026.

Li Zongyu (born 27 May 2003) is a Chinese female tennis player.

Li has a career-high singles ranking by the WTA of 288, achieved on 22 June 2026, and a best doubles ranking of world No. 196, achieved on 9 February 2026. She has won seven singles titles and nine doubles titles on the ITF World Tour.

== Career ==
In July 2023, she defeated compatriot You Xiaodi at a W25 tournament in Naiman, China. This was her first title of the season and her fourth career singles title.

In July 2024, she won the W35 tournament held in Naiman, China.

In September 2024, she and her partner Shi Han reached the doubles final at the W50 tournament in Guiyang, China.

=== 2025: Bronze medal at the University Games and WTA Tour debut ===
In July 2025, Li won the bronze medal in the women's Doubles Tennis competition at the 2025 Summer World University Games alongside Yao Xinxin.

Li made her WTA Tour main-draw debut at the 2025 Jiangxi Open, in the doubles tournament, partnering with Li Yu-yun. In the first round, they defeated Quinn Gleason and Elena Pridankina in two sets.

== ITF Circuit finals ==
=== Singles: 10 (7 titles, 3 runner-ups) ===
Legend
W100 tournaments (1–0)
W50 tournaments (0–1)
W25/35 tournaments (2–0)
W15 tournaments (4–2)

Result	W–L	Date	Tournament	Tier	Surface	Opponent	Score
Loss	0–1	Oct 2021	ITF Sharm El Sheikh, Egypt	W15	Hard	(China) Bai Zhuoxuan	4–6, 3–6
Win	1–1	Nov 2021	ITF Sharm El Sheikh, Egypt	W15	Hard	(Romania) Elena-Teodora Cadar	6–4, 6–2
Win	2–1	Aug 2022	ITF Monastir, Tunisia	W15	Hard	(China) Wei Sijia	6–4, 6–3
Loss	2–2	Sep 2022	ITF Monastir, Tunisia	W15	Hard	(China) Wei Sijia	3–6, 1–6
Win	3–2	Nov 2022	ITF Sharm El Sheikh, Egypt	W15	Hard	(Russia) Ekaterina Shalimova	6–3, 6–2
Win	4–2	Jul 2023	ITF Naiman, China	W25	Hard	(China) You Xiaodi	6–4, 6–2
Loss	4–3	May 2024	Kunming Open, China	W50	Clay	(China) Shi Han	4–6, 3–6
Win	5–3	Jul 2024	ITF Naiman, China	W35	Hard	(China) Liu Fangzhou	4–6, 6–2, 6–4
Win	6–3	Nov 2025	ITF Hua Hin, Thailand	W15	Hard	(Thailand) Anchisa Chanta	6–3, 6–3
Win	7–3	Jun 2026	ITF Wuning, China	W100	Hard	(China) Huang Yujia	6–4, 6–2

=== Doubles: 19 (9 titles, 10 runner-ups) ===
Legend
W75 tournaments (1–3)
W50 tournaments (1–3)
W25/35 tournaments (5–3)
W15 tournaments (2–1)

Result	W–L	Date	Tournament	Tier	Surface	Partner	Opponents	Score
Win	1–0	Aug 2022	ITF Monastir, Tunisia	W15	Hard	(China) Jiang Zijun	(India) Bhuvana Kalva (India) Jennifer Luikham	6–1, 6–2
Loss	1–1	Aug 2022	ITF Monastir, Tunisia	W15	Hard	(Australia) Mia Repac	(Japan) Saki Imamura (Japan) Honoka Kobayashi	6–3, 0–6, [6–10]
Loss	1–2	Jun 2023	ITF Madrid, Spain	W25	Hard	(India) Vasanti Shinde	(United States) Dalayna Hewitt (United States) Alana Smith	6–4, 2–6, [6–10]
Loss	1–3	Jun 2024	ITF Changwon, Korea	W35	Hard	(China) Shi Han	(New Zealand) Paige Hourigan (Japan) Erika Sema	4–6, 6–4, [4–10]
Loss	1–4	Sep 2024	ITF Guiyang, China	W50	Hard	(China) Shi Han	(China) Feng Shuo (China) Ye Qiuyu	6–7^{(3)}, 3–6
Win	2–4	Jan 2025	ITF Antalya, Turkey	W15	Clay	(Chinese Taipei) Li Yu-yun	(Norway) Astrid Brune Olsen (Japan) Ena Koike	6–4, 4–6, [11–9]
Win	3–4	Feb 2025	ITF Antalya, Turkey	W35	Clay	(Chinese Taipei) Li Yu-yun	(Thailand) Punnin Kovapitukted (Japan) Yuki Naito	6–3, 6–3
Win	4–4	Feb 2025	ITF Antalya, Turkey	W35	Clay	(Chinese Taipei) Li Yu-yun	(Italy) Nicole Fossa Huergo (Kazakhstan) Zhibek Kulambayeva	6–2, 2–6, [10–6]
Win	5–4	Feb 2025	ITF Antalya, Turkey	W35	Clay	(Chinese Taipei) Li Yu-yun	(Russia) Amina Anshba (Japan) Yuki Naito	6–3, 6–4
Loss	5–5	Mar 2025	ITF Shenzhen, China	W50	Hard	(China) Xun Fangying	(Hong Kong) Cody Wong (China) Zheng Wushuang	6–3, 5–7, [2–10]
Win	6–5	May 2025	ITF Goyang, South Korea	W35	Hard	(China) Feng Shuo	(Japan) Hiromi Abe (Japan) Ikumi Yamazaki	6–2, 7–5
Loss	6–6	Jul 2025	Ladies Open Hechingen, Germany	W75	Clay	(China) Feng Shuo	(Slovakia) Renáta Jamrichová (Russia) Elena Pridankina	2–6, 2–6
Win	7–6	Oct 2025	ITF Kunshan, China	W35	Hard	(China) Zheng Wushuang	(India) Rutuja Bhosale (India) Ankita Raina	6–2, 6–2
Loss	7–7	Feb 2026	Open Andrézieux-Bouthéon 42, France	W75	Hard (i)	(Chinese Taipei) Li Yu-yun	(France) Julie Belgraver (Belgium) Lara Salden	4–6, 6–3, [5–10]
Win	8–7	Feb 2026	ITF Mâcon, France	W50	Hard (i)	(Chinese Taipei) Li Yu-yun	(Italy) Enola Chiesa (France) Jenny Lim	6–3, 5–7, [10–7]
Loss	8–8	Apr 2026	ITF Luzhou, China	W35	Hard	(Chinese Taipei) Lee Ya-hsin	(China) Zhang Ying (China) Zheng Wushuang	6–2, 4–6, [10–12]
Loss	8–9	Aug 2026	Serbian Tennis Tour, Serbia	W75	Clay	(China) Feng Shuo	(Bulgaria) Rositsa Dencheva; Varvara Panshina	4–6, 5–7
Win	9–9	Aug 2026	ITF Bytom, Poland	W75	Clay	(China) Feng Shuo	(Romania) Oana Gavrilă (Greece) Sapfo Sakellaridi	6–4, 6–2
Loss	9–10	Oct 2026	ITF Cherbourg-en-Cotentin, France	W50	Hard (i)	(China) Feng Shuo	(Germany) Nastasja Schunk (Germany) Valentina Steiner	6–7^{(2)}, 4–6
