= Anouck Vrancken Peeters =

Dutch tennis player (born 2003)

- Country (sports): Netherlands
- Born: 13 February 2003 (age 23)
- Prize money: $70,751

Singles
- Career record: 160–114
- Career titles: 4 ITF
- Highest ranking: No. 288 (19 January 2026)
- Current ranking: No. 315 (10 August 2026)

Doubles
- Career record: 2–7
- Highest ranking: No. 1544 (29 January 2024)
- Last updated on: 15 August 2026.

Anouck Vrancken Peeters (born 13 February 2003) is a Dutch tennis player. She has a career-high WTA ranking of No. 288 in singles, achieved on 19 January 2026.

== Career overview ==
She is from The Hague and is a member of LTC Naaldwijk tennis club. She turned professional in 2023 and reached her first senior final in August of that year.

In January 2025, she defeated Nikola Bartůňková of the Czech Republic to reach the final of the W15 indoor event in Oslo. In the final, she defeated Josy Daems of Germany for her first senior title. She won a second W15 title in Bucharest in February 2025, beating Anastasia Kulikova in the final. In March 2025, he defeated Czech player Anna Sisková for another title at that level, in Sharm el-Sheikh.

In June 2025, Vrancken Peeters was awarded a wildcard entry into the Rosmalen Open for her WTA Tour main-draw singles debut, in which she lost against Lulu Sun in the first round.

== ITF Circuit finals ==
=== Singles: 8 (4 titles, 4 runner-ups) ===
Legend W35 tournaments W15 tournaments	Finals by surface Hard (4–1) Clay (0–3)

Result	W–L	Date	Tournament	Tier	Surface	Opponent	Score
Loss	0–1	Aug 2022	ITF Eindhoven, Netherlands	W15	Clay	(Estonia) Maileen Nuudi	3–6, 5–7
Loss	0–2	Aug 2023	ITF Baku, Azerbaijan	W15	Hard	(France) Yara Bartashevich	6–7^{(2)}, 4–6
Win	1–2	Jan 2025	ITF Oslo, Norway	W15	Hard (i)	(Germany) Josy Daems	6–2, 7–5
Win	2–2	Feb 2025	ITF Bucharest, Romania	W15	Hard (i)	(Finland) Anastasia Kulikova	6–4, 1–6, 6–3
Win	3–2	Mar 2025	ITF Sharm El Sheikh, Egypt	W15	Hard	(Czech Republic) Anna Sisková	7–5, 3–6, 6–2
Loss	3–3	Jul 2025	ITF Knokke-Heist, Belgium	W35	Clay	(Greece) Despina Papamichail	1–6, 2–6
Win	4–3	Oct 2025	ITF Villeneuve-d'Ascq, France	W35	Hard (i)	(France) Amandine Monnot	4–6, 7–5, 6–4
Loss	4–4	Jun 2026	Amstelveen Open, Netherlands	W35	Clay	(Poland) Weronika Falkowska	2–6, 6–7^{(4)}
