= Julie Belgraver =

French–Dutch tennis player (born 2002)

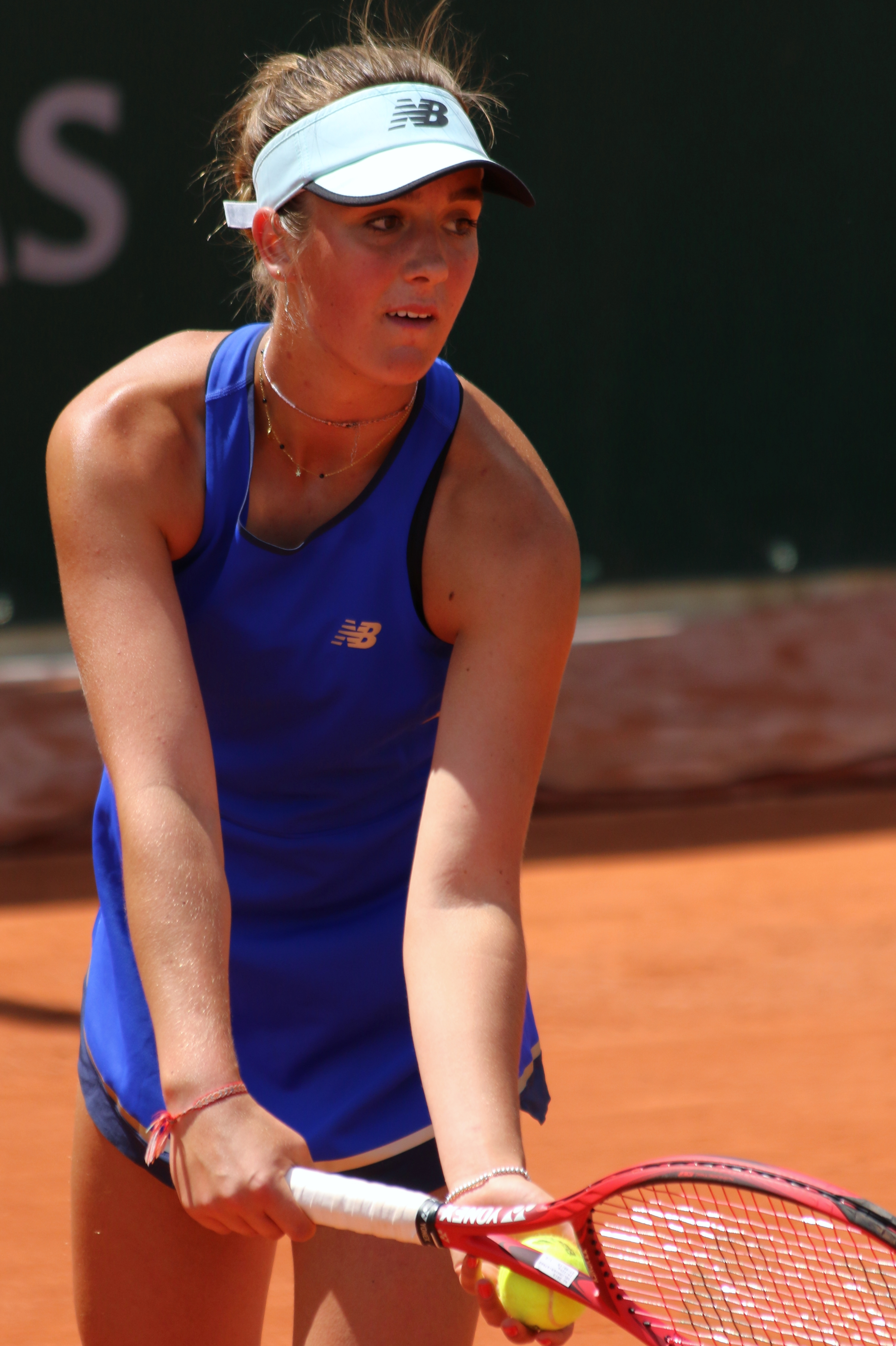
- Belgraver at the 2019 French Open
- Country (sports): France; Netherlands
- Born: 4 July 2002 (age 23)
- Plays: Right (two-handed backhand)
- Prize money: $205,097

Singles
- Career record: 179–144
- Career titles: 3 ITF
- Highest ranking: No. 231 (20 April 2026)
- Current ranking: No. 382 (22 June 2026)

Grand Slam singles results
- French Open: Q2 (2025)

Doubles
- Career record: 109–85
- Career titles: 8 ITF
- Highest ranking: No. 200 (22 September 2025)
- Current ranking: No. 335 (22 June 2026)

Grand Slam doubles results
- French Open: 1R (2019, 2025)

Grand Slam mixed doubles results
- French Open: 1R (2025)
- Last updated on: 26 June 2026.

Julie Belgraver (born 4 July 2002) is a French–Dutch tennis player. She is the daughter of former professional player Noëlle van Lottum.

Belgraver has a career-high singles ranking by the Women's Tennis Association (WTA) of 231, which she achieved on 20 April 2026. She also has a career-high doubles ranking of 200, achieved on 22 September 2025. She has won three singles and eight doubles titles on the ITF Women's World Tennis Tour.

Belgraver made her Grand Slam tournament debut at the 2019 French Open, after receiving a wildcard for the doubles main-draw, partnering Mylène Halemai.

== ITF Circuit finals ==
=== Singles: 9 (3 titles, 6 runner-ups) ===
Legend W75 tournaments W50 tournaments W35 tournaments W15 tournaments	Finals by surface Hard (3–4) Clay (0–2)

Result	W–L	Date	Tournament	Tier	Surface	Opponent	Score
Loss	0–1	Jan 2022	ITF Cancún, Mexico	W15	Hard	(Canada) Stacey Fung	6–7^{(1)}, 7–5
Win	1–1	Feb 2022	ITF Cancún, Mexico	W15	Hard	(Japan) Miharu Imanishi	1–6, 6–3, 7–5
Loss	1–2	Mar 2024	ITF Sharm El Sheikh, Egypt	W15	Hard	(Norway) Malene Helgø	1–6, 0–6
Loss	1–3	Apr 2024	ITF Nottingham, United Kingdom	W35	Hard	(United Kingdom) Mika Stojsavljevic	6–7^{(7)}, 3–6
Loss	1–4	Aug 2024	ITF Bydgoszcz, Poland	W35	Clay	(Poland) Daria Kuczer	2–6, 0–6
Win	2–4	Oct 2024	ITF Edmonton, Canada	W35	Hard (i)	(Canada) Ariana Arseneault	6–1, 3–6, 6–2
Loss	2–5	Jun 2025	Internationaux de Blois, France	W75	Clay	(Hungary) Panna Udvardy	5–7, 3–6
Win	3–5	Dec 2025	ITF Sharm El Sheikh, Egypt	W35	Hard	(Poland) Weronika Ewald	5–7, 7–6^{(2)}, 6–4
Loss	3–6	Feb 2026	Open de Mâcon, France	W50	Hard (i)	(Switzerland) Céline Naef	4–6, 1–6

=== Doubles: 16 (8 titles, 8 runner-ups) ===
Legend W75 tournaments W50 tournaments W25/35 tournaments W15 tournaments	Finals by surface Hard (5–5) Clay (3–3)

Result	W–L	Date	Tournament	Tier	Surface	Partner	Opponents	Score
Win	1–0	Mar 2018	ITF Amiens, France	W15	Clay	(Netherlands) Isabelle Haverlag	(Belgium) Lara Salden (France) Camille Sireix	7–6^{(4)}, 6–2
Win	2–0	Feb 2020	ITF Monastir, Tunisia	W15	Hard	(France) Mylène Halemai	(Bulgaria) Petia Arshinkova (Bulgaria) Gergana Topalova	2–6, 6–1, [10–4]
Win	3–0	Jun 2021	ITF Antalya, Turkey	W15	Clay	(Hungary) Amarissa Tóth	(United States) Christina Rosca (Bulgaria) Ani Vangelova	6–2, 7–5
Win	4–0	Sep 2021	ITF Aix-en-Provence, France	W15	Clay	(France) Léa Tholey	(Russia) Maria Bondarenko (South Korea) Ku Yeon-woo	6–1, 6–2
Loss	4–1	Nov 2021	ITF Pétange, Luxembourg	W25	Hard (i)	(France) Lucie Nguyen Tan	(Switzerland) Xenia Knoll (Switzerland) Joanne Züger	3–6, 3–6
Loss	4–2	Jan 2022	ITF Cancún, Mexico	W15	Hard	(France) Jade Bornay	(Japan) Natsuho Arakawa (United States) Hina Inoue	4–6, 5–7
Loss	4–3	Jan 2022	ITF Cancún, Mexico	W15	Hard	(France) Jade Bornay	(Japan) Miharu Imanishi (Japan) Haine Ogata	2–6, 3–6
Loss	4–4	May 2022	ITF Båstad, Sweden	W25	Clay	(Sweden) Fanny Östlund	(Germany) Mona Barthel (Sweden) Caijsa Hennemann	1–6, 4–6
Loss	4–5	Jan 2024	ITF Sunderland, UK	W35	Hard (i)	(Slovakia) Katarína Strešnaková	(Finland) Laura Hietaranta (United Kingdom) Ella McDonald	4–6, 1–6
Win	5–5	Mar 2024	ITF Sharm El Sheikh, Egypt	W15	Hard	(United Kingdom) Holly Hutchinson	(Romania) Karola Bejenaru (South Korea) Jeong Bo-young	7–6^{(4)}, 3–6, [10–7]
Loss	5–6	Oct 2024	Toronto Challenger, Canada	W75	Hard (i)	(Netherlands) Jasmijn Gimbrère	(United States) Jamie Loeb (Lithuania) Justina Mikulskytė	2–6, 1–6
Loss	5–7	Jan 2025	ITF Naples, United States	W35	Clay	(Netherlands) Jasmijn Gimbrère	(United States) Allura Zamarripa (United States) Maribella Zamarripa	5–7, 1–6
Loss	5–8	Jan 2025	Vero Beach Open, US	W75	Clay	(Netherlands) Jasmijn Gimbrère	(United States) Carmen Corley (Netherlands) Eva Vedder	2–6, 3–6
Win	6–8	Mar 2025	Branik Maribor Open, Slovenia	W75	Hard (i)	(Poland) Urszula Radwańska	(United Kingdom) Lily Miyazaki (France) Jessika Ponchet	6–1, 6–4
Win	7–8	Sep 2025	ITF Leiria, Portugal	W50	Hard	(Canada) Kayla Cross	(United States) Catherine Harrison (United States) Ashley Lahey	3–6, 6–3, [10–8]
Win	8–8	Feb 2026	Open Andrézieux-Bouthéon 42, France	W75	Hard (i)	(Belgium) Lara Salden	(Chinese Taipei) Li Yu-yun (China) Li Zongyu	6–4, 3–6, [10–5]
