= Daniil Medvedev career statistics =

Career finals
Discipline	Type	Won	Lost	Total
Singles
Singles	Grand Slam	1	5	6
Singles	ATP Finals	1	1	2
Singles	ATP 1000	6	5	11
Singles	ATP 500	5	6	11
Singles	ATP 250	11	3	14
Singles	Olympics	–	–	–
Singles	Total	24	20	44
Doubles
Doubles	Grand Slam	–	–	–
Doubles	ATP Finals	–	–	–
Doubles	ATP 1000	–	–	–
Doubles	ATP 500	–	–	–
Doubles	ATP 250	–	–	–
Doubles	Olympics	–	–	–
Doubles	Total	–	–	–

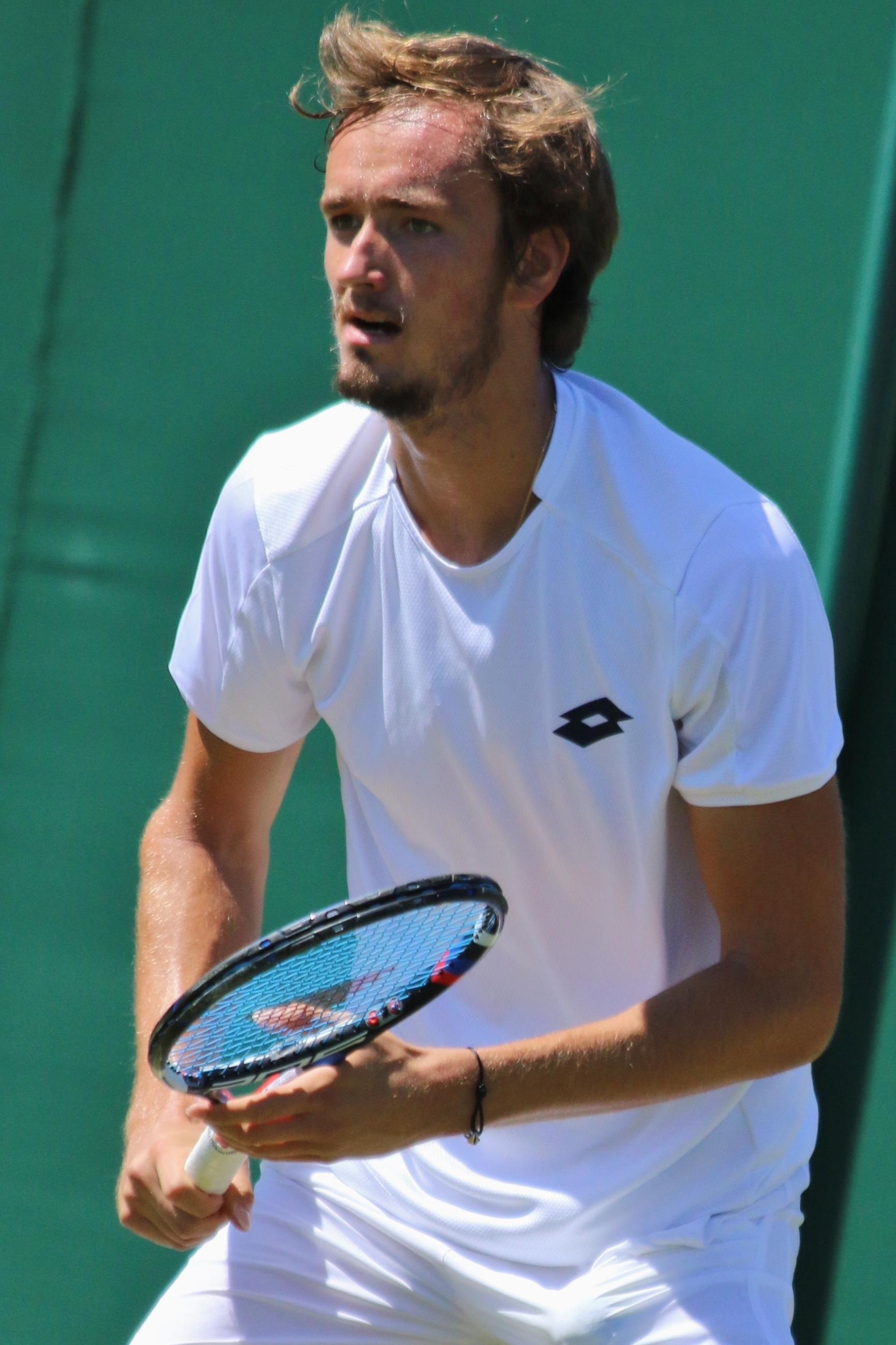
Daniil Medvedev in 2018

This is a list of main career statistics of Russian professional tennis player Daniil Medvedev. All statistics are according to the ATP Tour and ITF websites.

== Performance timelines ==
Key
W	F	SF	QF	#R	RR	Q#	P#	DNQ	A	Z#	PO	G	S	B	NMS	NTI	P	NH

(W) winner; (F) finalist; (SF) semifinalist; (QF) quarterfinalist; (#R) rounds 4, 3, 2, 1; (RR) round-robin stage; (Q#) qualification round; (P#) preliminary round; (DNQ) did not qualify; (A) absent; (Z#) Davis/Fed Cup Zonal Group (with number indication) or (PO) play-off; (G) gold, (S) silver or (B) bronze Olympic/Paralympic medal; (NMS) not a Masters tournament; (NTI) not a Tier I tournament; (P) postponed; (NH) not held; (SR) strike rate (events won / competed); (W–L) win–loss record.
To avoid confusion and double counting, these charts are updated at the conclusion of a tournament or when the player's participation has ended.

Current through the 2026 ATP Finals.

Tournament	2016	2017	2018	2019	2020	2021	2022	2023	2024	2025	2026	SR	W–L	Win %
Grand Slam tournaments
Australian Open	A	1R	2R	4R	4R	F	F	3R	F	2R	4R	0 / 10	31–10	76%
French Open	A	1R	1R	1R	1R	QF	4R	1R	4R	1R	1R	0 / 10	10–10	50%
Wimbledon	Q3	2R	3R	3R	NH	4R	A (Note: Russian athletes were banned from competing following the 2022 Russian invasion of Ukraine.)	SF	SF	1R	3R	0 / 8	20–8	71%
US Open	Q1	1R	3R	F	SF	W	4R	F	QF	1R	4R	1 / 10	36–9	80%
Win–loss	0–0	1–4	5–4	11–4	8–3	20–3	12–3	13–4	18–4	1–4	8–4	1 / 38	97–37	72%
Year-end championships
ATP Finals	did not qualify			RR	W	F	RR	SF	RR	DNQ		1 / 12	12–11	52%
National representation
Summer Olympics (Note: 2020 Summer Olympics is postponed to 2021 due to COVID-19 pandemic.)	A	not held				QF	NH		3R	not held		0 / 2	5–2	71%
Davis Cup	A	1R	Z1	QR	W (Note: Edition is split into the two years due to COVID-19.)		absent					1 / 2	8–2	80%
ATP 1000 tournaments
Indian Wells Open	A	1R	3R	3R	NH	4R	3R	F	F	SF	F	0 / 9	25–9	74%
Miami Open	A	A	2R	4R	NH	QF	QF	W	SF	2R	3R	1 / 8	19–7	73%
Monte-Carlo Masters	Q1	1R	2R	SF	NH	A	A	QF	3R	3R	2R	0 / 7	10–7	59%
Madrid Open	A	A	1R	1R	NH	3R	A	4R	QF	QF	4R	0 / 7	10–7	57%
Italian Open	A	A	1R	1R	A	2R	A	W	4R	4R	SF	1 / 7	13–6	68%
Canadian Open	A	1R	3R	F	NH	W	2R	QF	2R	3R	2R	1 / 9	14–8	64%
Cincinnati Open	A	1R	1R	W	QF	SF	SF	3R	2R	2R	3R	1 / 10	15–9	63%
Shanghai Masters	A	1R	2R	W	not held			3R	QF	SF	SF	1 / 7	18–6	75%
Paris Masters	A	Q1	2R	2R	W	F	2R	2R	2R	QF	2R	1 / 9	12–8	60%
Win–loss	0–0	0–5	8–9	22–7	7–1	18–6	7–5	24–7	18–9	17–9	16–9	6 / 73	137–67	67%
Career statistics
	2016	2017	2018	2019	2020	2021	2022	2023	2024	2025	2026	SR	W–L	Win%
Tournaments (Note: Including appearances in Grand Slam and ATP World Tour main draw matches, in Summer Olympics, and not included in Davis Cup, Laver Cup, ATP Cup and the United Cup.)	5	24	26	23	11	17	18	22	18	24	20	Career total: 209		
Titles	0	0	3	4	2	4	2	5	0	1	4	Career total: 25		
Finals	0	1	3	9	2	7	5	9	2	2	5	Career total: 45		
Hard W–L	3–2	16–18	38–15	46–13	28–8	51–8	34–14	49–12	29–14	30–16	38–11	23 / 140	362–131	73%
Clay W–L	1–2	0–4	1–5	8–5	0–2	5–3	3–2	10–3	11–5	6–4	5–4	1 / 40	50–39	56%
Grass W–L	1–1	8–4	4–4	5–3	0–0	7–2	8–3	7–3	6–2	5–3	6–3	1 / 29	57–28	67%
Overall win–loss (Note: Including matches in Grand Slam, in ATP World Tour, in Summer Olympics, in Davis Cup, Laver Cup, ATP Cup and the United Cup.)	5–5	24–26	43–24	59–21	28–10	63–13	45–19	66–18	46–21	41–23	49–18	25 / 209	469–198	70%
Win %	50%	48%	64%	74%	74%	83%	70%	79%	69%	64%	73%	Career total: 70%		
Year-end ranking	99	65	16	5	4	2	7	3	5	13	5	$53,684,618		

=== Doubles ===
Tournament	2015	2016	2017	2018	2019	2020	2021	2022	2023	2024	2025	2026	SR	W–L	Win%
Grand Slam tournaments
Australian Open	A	A	A	A	A	A	A	A	A	A	A	A	0 / 0	0–0	–
French Open	A	A	1R	A	A	A	A	A	A	A	A	A	0 / 1	0–1	0%
Wimbledon	A	A	A	A	A	NH	A	A	A	A	A	A	0 / 0	0–0	–
US Open	A	A	2R	A	A	A	A	A	A	A	A	A	0 / 1	1–1	50%
Win–loss	0–0	0–0	1–2	0–0	0–0	0–0	0–0	0–0	0–0	0–0	0–0	0–0	0 / 2	1–2	33%
National representation
Summer Olympics	NH	A	not held				1R	not held		1R	not held		0 / 2	0–2	0%
Davis Cup	A	A	1R	Z1	QR	W		absent					1 / 2	0–1	0%
ATP 1000 tournaments
Indian Wells Open	A	A	A	A	1R	NH	A	A	A	A	A	1R	0 / 2	0–2	0%
Miami Open	A	A	A	1R	1R	NH	A	A	A	A	A	A	0 / 2	0–2	0%
Monte-Carlo Masters	A	A	A	A	QF	NH	A	A	A	1R	A	A	0 / 2	2–1	67%
Madrid Open	A	A	A	A	QF	NH	2R	A	A	1R	A	A	0 / 3	3–2	75%
Italian Open	A	A	A	A	A	A	2R	A	A	A	A	A	0 / 1	1–1	50%
Canadian Open	A	A	A	A	A	NH	A	A	A	QF	A	QF	0 / 2	4–2	67%
Cincinnati Open	A	A	A	A	2R	A	A	A	A	A	A	A	0 / 1	1–1	50%
Shanghai Masters	A	A	A	A	A	NH			A	A	A	A	0 / 0	0–0	–
Paris Masters	A	A	A	A	A	1R	A	A	A	A	A	A	0 / 1	0–1	0%
Win–loss	0–0	0–0	0–0	0–1	5–3	0–1	2–2	0–0	0–0	2–3	0–0	0–1	0 / 13	9–11	45%
Career statistics
	2015	2016	2017	2018	2019	2020	2021	2022	2023	2024	2025	2026	Career		
Tournaments	1	1	3	4	8	1	3	2	0	4	1	2	Career total: 30		
Titles	0	0	0	0	0	0	0	0	0	0	0	0	Career total: 0		
Finals	0	0	0	0	0	0	0	0	0	0	0	0	Career total: 0		
Overall W–L	1–1	1–1	2–4	1–4	5–5	1–2	2–3	3–3	0–0	2–4	0–1	2–2	0 / 30	20–30	40%
Win %	50%	50%	33%	20%	50%	33%	40%	50%	0%	33%	0%	50%	40%		
Year-end ranking	331	301	348	389	188	204	280	407	—	332	—				

== Grand Slam tournaments finals ==
=== Singles: 6 (1 title, 5 runner-ups) ===
Result	Year	Tournament	Surface	Opponent	Score
Loss	2019	US Open	Hard	(Spain) Rafael Nadal	5–7, 3–6, 7–5, 6–4, 4–6
Loss	2021	Australian Open	Hard	(Serbia) Novak Djokovic	5–7, 2–6, 2–6
Win	2021	US Open	Hard	(Serbia) Novak Djokovic	6–4, 6–4, 6–4
Loss	2022	Australian Open	Hard	(Spain) Rafael Nadal	6–2, 7–6^{(7–5)}, 4–6, 4–6, 5–7
Loss	2023	US Open	Hard	(Serbia) Novak Djokovic	3–6, 6–7^{(5–7)}, 3–6
Loss	2024	Australian Open	Hard	(Italy) Jannik Sinner	6–3, 6–3, 4–6, 4–6, 3–6

== Other significant finals ==
=== Year-end championships ===
==== Singles: 2 (1 title, 1 runner-up) ====
Result	Year	Tournament	Surface	Opponent	Score
Win	2020	ATP Finals, United Kingdom	Hard (i)	(Austria) Dominic Thiem	4–6, 7–6^{(7–2)}, 6–4
Loss	2021	ATP Finals, Italy	Hard (i)	(Germany) Alexander Zverev	4–6, 4–6

=== ATP Masters 1000 ===
==== Singles: 11 (6 titles, 5 runner-ups) ====
Result	Year	Tournament	Surface	Opponent	Score
Loss	2019	Canadian Open	Hard	(Spain) Rafael Nadal	3–6, 0–6
Win	2019	Cincinnati Open	Hard	(Belgium) David Goffin	7–6^{(7–3)}, 6–4
Win	2019	Shanghai Masters	Hard	(Germany) Alexander Zverev	6–4, 6–1
Win	2020	Paris Masters	Hard (i)	(Germany) Alexander Zverev	5–7, 6–4, 6–1
Win	2021	Canadian Open	Hard	(United States) Reilly Opelka	6–4, 6–3
Loss	2021	Paris Masters	Hard (i)	(Serbia) Novak Djokovic	6–4, 3–6, 3–6
Loss	2023	Indian Wells Open	Hard	(Spain) Carlos Alcaraz	3–6, 2–6
Win	2023	Miami Open	Hard	(Italy) Jannik Sinner	7–5, 6–3
Win	2023	Italian Open	Clay	(Denmark) Holger Rune	7–5, 7–5
Loss	2024	Indian Wells Open	Hard	(Spain) Carlos Alcaraz	6–7^{(5–7)}, 1–6
Loss	2026	Indian Wells Open	Hard	(Italy) Jannik Sinner	6–7^{(6–8)}, 6–7^{(4–7)}

== ATP Tour finals ==
=== Singles: 45 (25 titles, 20 runner-ups) ===
Legend Grand Slam (1–5) ATP Finals (1–1) ATP 1000 (6–5) ATP 500 (5–6) ATP 250 (12–3)	Finals by surface Hard (23–16) Clay (1–1) Grass (1–3)	Finals by setting Outdoor (15–17) Indoor (10–3)

Result	W–L	Date	Tournament	Tier	Surface	Opponent	Score
Loss	0–1	Jan 2017	Maharashtra Open, India	ATP 250	Hard	(Spain) Roberto Bautista Agut	3–6, 4–6
Win	1–1	Jan 2018	Sydney International, Australia	ATP 250	Hard	(Australia) Alex de Minaur	1–6, 6–4, 7–5
Win	2–1	Aug 2018	Winston-Salem Open, United States	ATP 250	Hard	(United States) Steve Johnson	6–4, 6–4
Win	3–1	Oct 2018	Japan Open, Japan	ATP 500	Hard (i)	(Japan) Kei Nishikori	6–2, 6–4
Loss	3–2	Jan 2019	Brisbane International, Australia	ATP 250	Hard	(Japan) Kei Nishikori	4–6, 6–3, 2–6
Win	4–2	Feb 2019	Sofia Open, Bulgaria	ATP 250	Hard (i)	(Hungary) Márton Fucsovics	6–4, 6–3
Loss	4–3	Apr 2019	Barcelona Open, Spain	ATP 500	Clay	(Austria) Dominic Thiem	4–6, 0–6
Loss	4–4	Aug 2019	Washington Open, United States	ATP 500	Hard	(Australia) Nick Kyrgios	6–7^{(6–8)}, 6–7^{(4–7)}
Loss	4–5	Aug 2019	Canadian Open, Canada	ATP 1000	Hard	(Spain) Rafael Nadal	3–6, 0–6
Win	5–5	Aug 2019	Cincinnati Open, United States	ATP 1000	Hard	(Belgium) David Goffin	7–6^{(7–3)}, 6–4
Loss	5–6	Sep 2019	US Open, United States	Grand Slam	Hard	(Spain) Rafael Nadal	5–7, 3–6, 7–5, 6–4, 4–6
Win	6–6	Sep 2019	St. Petersburg Open, Russia	ATP 250	Hard (i)	(Croatia) Borna Ćorić	6–3, 6–1
Win	7–6	Oct 2019	Shanghai Masters, China	ATP 1000	Hard	(Germany) Alexander Zverev	6–4, 6–1
Win	8–6	Nov 2020	Paris Masters, Paris	ATP 1000	Hard (i)	(Germany) Alexander Zverev	5–7, 6–4, 6–1
Win	9–6	Nov 2020	ATP Finals, United Kingdom	Finals	Hard (i)	(Austria) Dominic Thiem	4–6, 7–6^{(7–2)}, 6–4
Loss	9–7	Feb 2021	Australian Open, Australia	Grand Slam	Hard	(Serbia) Novak Djokovic	5–7, 2–6, 2–6
Win	10–7	Mar 2021	Open 13, France	ATP 250	Hard (i)	(France) Pierre-Hugues Herbert	6–4, 6–7^{(4–7)}, 6–4
Win	11–7	Jun 2021	Mallorca Open, Spain	ATP 250	Grass	(United States) Sam Querrey	6–4, 6–2
Win	12–7	Aug 2021	Canadian Open, Canada	ATP 1000	Hard	(United States) Reilly Opelka	6–4, 6–3
Win	13–7	Sep 2021	US Open, United States	Grand Slam	Hard	(Serbia) Novak Djokovic	6–4, 6–4, 6–4
Loss	13–8	Nov 2021	Paris Masters, France	ATP 1000	Hard (i)	(Serbia) Novak Djokovic	6–4, 3–6, 3–6
Loss	13–9	Nov 2021	ATP Finals, Italy	Finals	Hard (i)	(Germany) Alexander Zverev	4–6, 4–6
Loss	13–10	Jan 2022	Australian Open, Australia	Grand Slam	Hard	(Spain) Rafael Nadal	6–2, 7–6^{(7–5)}, 4–6, 4–6, 5–7
Loss	13–11	Jun 2022	Rosmalen Championships, Netherlands	ATP 250	Grass	(Netherlands) Tim van Rijthoven	4–6, 1–6
Loss	13–12	Jun 2022	Halle Open, Germany	ATP 500	Grass	(Poland) Hubert Hurkacz	1–6, 4–6
Win	14–12	Aug 2022	Los Cabos Open, Mexico	ATP 250	Hard	(United Kingdom) Cameron Norrie	7–5, 6–0
Win	15–12	Oct 2022	Vienna Open, Austria	ATP 500	Hard (i)	(Canada) Denis Shapovalov	4–6, 6–3, 6–2
Win	16–12	Feb 2023	Rotterdam Open, Netherlands	ATP 500	Hard (i)	(Italy) Jannik Sinner	5–7, 6–2, 6–2
Win	17–12	Feb 2023	Qatar Open, Qatar	ATP 250	Hard	(United Kingdom) Andy Murray	6–4, 6–4
Win	18–12	Feb 2023	Dubai Tennis Championships, UAE	ATP 500	Hard	Andrey Rublev	6–2, 6–2
Loss	18–13	Mar 2023	Indian Wells Open, United States	ATP 1000	Hard	(Spain) Carlos Alcaraz	3–6, 2–6
Win	19–13	Mar 2023	Miami Open, United States	ATP 1000	Hard	(Italy) Jannik Sinner	7–5, 6–3
Win	20–13	May 2023	Italian Open, Italy	ATP 1000	Clay	(Denmark) Holger Rune	7–5, 7–5
Loss	20–14	Sep 2023	US Open, United States	Grand Slam	Hard	(Serbia) Novak Djokovic	3–6, 6–7^{(5–7)}, 3–6
Loss	20–15	Oct 2023	China Open, China	ATP 500	Hard	(Italy) Jannik Sinner	6–7^{(2–7)}, 6–7^{(2–7)}
Loss	20–16	Oct 2023	Vienna Open, Austria	ATP 500	Hard (i)	(Italy) Jannik Sinner	6–7^{(7–9)}, 6–4, 3–6
Loss	20–17	Jan 2024	Australian Open, Australia	Grand Slam	Hard	(Italy) Jannik Sinner	6–3, 6–3, 4–6, 4–6, 3–6
Loss	20–18	Mar 2024	Indian Wells Open, United States	ATP 1000	Hard	(Spain) Carlos Alcaraz	6–7^{(5–7)}, 1–6
Loss	20–19	Jun 2025	Halle Open, Germany	ATP 500	Grass	(Kazakhstan) Alexander Bublik	3–6, 6–7^{(4–7)}
Win	21–19	Oct 2025	Almaty Open, Kazakhstan	ATP 250	Hard (i)	(France) Corentin Moutet	7–5, 4–6, 6–3
Win	22–19	Jan 2026	Brisbane International, Australia	ATP 250	Hard	(United States) Brandon Nakashima	6–2, 7–6^{(7–1)}
Win	23–19	Feb 2026	Dubai Tennis Championships, UAE (2)	ATP 500	Hard	(Netherlands) Tallon Griekspoor	walkover
Loss	23–20	Mar 2026	Indian Wells Open, United States	ATP 1000	Hard	(Italy) Jannik Sinner	6–7^{(6–8)}, 6–7^{(4–7)}
Win	24–20	Sep 2026	Hangzhou Open, China	ATP 250	Hard	Andrey Rublev	7–5, 6–4
Win	25–20	Oct 2026	Almaty Open, Kazakhstan (2)	ATP 250	Hard (i)	(Georgia (country)) Nikoloz Basilashvili	6–7^{(6–8)}, 6–1, 6–3

== ATP Challenger Tour finals ==
=== Singles: 2 (1 title, 1 runner-up) ===
Finals by surface
Hard (1–1)
Clay (–)

Result	W–L	Date	Tournament	Surface	Opponent	Score
Loss	0–1	Aug 2016	Slovenia Open, Slovenia	Hard	(Germany) Florian Mayer	1–6, 2–6
Win	1–1	Sep 2016	Trophée des Alpilles, France	Hard	(Belgium) Joris De Loore	6–3, 6–3

== ITF Tour finals ==
=== Singles: 4 (4 titles) ===
Finals by surface
Hard (1–0)
Clay (2–0)
Carpet (1–0)

Result	W–L	Date	Tournament	Surface	Opponent	Score
Win	1–0	Aug 2014	F2 Telavi, Georgia	Clay	(Italy) Gianluca Mager	3–6, 6–2, 6–2
Win	2–0	Apr 2015	F13 Port El Kantaoui, Tunisia	Hard	(France) Tom Jomby	6–4, 6–0
Win	3–0	May 2015	F1 Moscow, Russia	Clay	(Russia) Ivan Gakhov	6–4, 6–1
Win	4–0	Feb 2016	F2 Trimbach, Switzerland	Carpet (i)	(Switzerland) Adrien Bossel	6–1, 6–3

=== Doubles: 10 (4 titles, 6 runner-ups) ===
Finals by surface
Hard (2–4)
Clay (2–2)

Result	W–L	Date	Tournament	Surface	Partner	Opponents	Score
Win	1–0	Aug 2014	ITF Telavi, Georgia	Clay	(France) Florent Diep	(Italy) Emanuele Molina (Italy) Riccardo Sinicropi	6–1, 4–6, [10–3]
Win	2–0	Sep 2014	ITF Mulhouse, France	Hard (i)	(Russia) Karen Khachanov	(France) Élie Rousset (France) Olivier Charroin	7–6^{(7–5)}, 4–6, [10–7]
Loss	2–1	Jan 2015	ITF El Kantaoui, Tunisia	Hard	(Bulgaria) Aleksandar Lazov	(Italy) Riccardo Ghedin (Italy) Claudio Grassi	6–4, 6–7^{(2–7)}, [4–10]
Loss	2–2	Feb 2015	ITF El Kantaoui, Tunisia	Hard	(Bulgaria) Aleksandar Lazov	(Germany) Peter Heller (Austria) Dominic Weidinger	3–6, 3–6
Loss	2–3	Apr 2015	ITF El Kantaoui, Tunisia	Hard	(France) Rémy Chala	(Tunisia) Anis Ghorbel (Bulgaria) Vasko Mladenov	6–4, 1–6, [9–11]
Win	3–3	May 2015	ITF Grasse, France	Clay	(Belgium) Julien Dubail	(France) Maxime Chazal (France) Jérôme Inzerillo	6–4, 6–4
Loss	3–4	Jun 2015	ITF Kazan, Russia	Clay	(Ukraine) Volodymyr Uzhylovskyi	(Belarus) Maxim Dubarenco (Ukraine) Vladyslav Manafov	3–6, 6–4, [6–10]
Loss	3–5	Jul 2015	ITF Saint-Gervais-les-Bains, France	Clay	(China) Zhang Zhizhen	(Brazil) Caio Silva (Chile) Ricardo Urzúa-Rivera	6–7^{(4–7)}, 1–6
Loss	3–6	Aug 2015	ITF Minsk, Belarus	Hard	(China) Zhang Zhizhen	(Belarus) Egor Gerasimov (Belarus) Ilya Ivashka	1–6, 3–6
Win	4–6	Mar 2016	ITF Lille, France	Hard (i)	(Russia) Denis Matsukevich	(Netherlands) David Pel (Netherlands) Antal van der Duim	7–6^{(7–5)}, 4–6, [11–9]

== ATP ranking ==
Daniil Medevdev has spent in total 16 weeks as ATP world No. 1.

Year	2014	2015	2016	2017	2018	2019	2020	2021	2022	2023	2024	2025	2026	2027
High	642	329	98	48	16	4	4	2	1	2	3	5	5	
Low	1753	659	329	99	84	19	6	4	7	12	5	18	13	
End	655	329	99	65	16	5	4	2	7	3	5	13	5	

Weeks in top	Total weeks
at number 1	16
top 5	248*
top 10	316*
top 20	401*
top 50	422*
top 100	502*

*as of 23 November 2026.

== Wins over top 10 players ==
- Medvedev has a 54–58 (48.21%) record against players who were, at the time the match was played, ranked in the top 10.

Year	2014	2015	2016	2017	2018	2019	2020	2021	2022	2023	2024	2025	2026	2027	Total
Wins	0	0	0	1	0	8	7	10	3	12	6	3	4		54

#	Player	Rk	Event	Surface	Rd	Score	Rk	Ref
2017
1.	(Switzerland) Stan Wawrinka	3	Wimbledon, United Kingdom	Grass	1R	6–4, 3–6, 6–4, 6–1	49	
2019
2.	(Greece) Stefanos Tsitsipas	8	Monte Carlo Masters, France	Clay	3R	6–2, 1–6, 6–4	14	
3.	(Serbia) Novak Djokovic	1	Monte-Carlo Masters, France	Clay	QF	6–3, 4–6, 6–2	14	
4.	(Japan) Kei Nishikori	7	Barcelona Open, Spain	Clay	SF	6–4, 3–6, 7–5	14	
5.	(Austria) Dominic Thiem	4	Canadian Open, Canada	Hard	QF	6–3, 6–1	9	
6.	(Russia) Karen Khachanov	8	Canadian Open, Canada	Hard	SF	6–1, 7–6^{(8–6)}	9	
7.	(Serbia) Novak Djokovic	1	Cincinnati Open, United States	Hard	SF	3–6, 6–3, 6–3	8	
8.	(Greece) Stefanos Tsitsipas	7	Shanghai Masters, China	Hard	SF	7–6^{(7–5)}, 7–5	4	
9.	(Germany) Alexander Zverev	6	Shanghai Masters, China	Hard	F	6–4, 6–1	4	
2020
10.	(Argentina) Diego Schwartzman	9	Paris Masters, France	Hard (i)	QF	6–3, 6–1	5	
11.	(Germany) Alexander Zverev	7	Paris Masters, France	Hard (i)	F	5–7, 6–4, 6–1	5	
12.	(Germany) Alexander Zverev	6	ATP Finals, United Kingdom	Hard (i)	RR	6–3, 6–4	4	
13.	(Serbia) Novak Djokovic	1	ATP Finals, United Kingdom	Hard (i)	RR	6–3, 6–3	4	
14.	(Argentina) Diego Schwartzman	9	ATP Finals, United Kingdom	Hard (i)	RR	6–3, 6–3	4	
15.	(Spain) Rafael Nadal	2	ATP Finals, United Kingdom	Hard (i)	SF	3–6, 7–6^{(7–4)}, 6–3	4	
16.	(Austria) Dominic Thiem	3	ATP Finals, United Kingdom	Hard (i)	F	4–6, 7–6^{(7–2)}, 6–4	4	
2021
17.	(Argentina) Diego Schwartzman	9	ATP Cup, Australia	Hard	RR	7–5, 6–3	4	
18.	(Germany) Alexander Zverev	7	ATP Cup, Australia	Hard	SF	3–6, 6–3, 7–5	4	
19.	(Italy) Matteo Berrettini	10	ATP Cup, Australia	Hard	F	6–4, 6–2	4	
20.	(Russia) Andrey Rublev	8	Australian Open, Australia	Hard	QF	7–5, 6–3, 6–2	4	
21.	(Greece) Stefanos Tsitsipas	6	Australian Open, Australia	Hard	SF	6–4, 6–2, 7–5	4	
22.	(Serbia) Novak Djokovic	1	US Open, United States	Hard	F	6–4, 6–4, 6–4	2	
23.	(Germany) Alexander Zverev	4	Paris Masters, France	Hard (i)	SF	6–2, 6–2	2	
24.	(Poland) Hubert Hurkacz	9	ATP Finals, Italy	Hard (i)	RR	6–7^{(5–7)}, 6–3, 6–4	2	
25.	(Germany) Alexander Zverev	3	ATP Finals, Italy	Hard (i)	RR	6–3, 6–7^{(3–7)}, 7–6^{(8–6)}	2	
26.	(Norway) Casper Ruud	8	ATP Finals, Italy	Hard (i)	SF	6–4, 6–2	2	
2022
27.	(Italy) Matteo Berrettini	7	ATP Cup, Australia	Hard	RR	6–2, 6–7^{(5–7)}, 6–4	2	
28.	(Canada) Félix Auger-Aliassime	9	Australian Open, Australia	Hard	QF	6–7^{(4–7)}, 3–6, 7–6^{(7–2)}, 7–5, 6–4	2	
29.	(Greece) Stefanos Tsitsipas	4	Australian Open, Australia	Hard	SF	7–6^{(7–5)}, 4–6, 6–4, 6–1	2	
2023
30.	(Canada) Félix Auger-Aliassime	8	Rotterdam Open, Netherlands	Hard (i)	QF	6–2, 6–4	11	
31.	(Canada) Félix Auger-Aliassime	9	Qatar Open, Qatar	Hard	SF	6–4, 7–6^{(9–7)}	8	
32.	(Serbia) Novak Djokovic	1	Dubai Tennis Championships, UAE	Hard	SF	6–4, 6–4	7	
33.	Andrey Rublev	6	Dubai Tennis Championships, UAE	Hard	F	6–2, 6–2	7	
34.	(Greece) Stefanos Tsitsipas	5	Italian Open, Italy	Clay	SF	7–5, 7–5	3	
35.	(Denmark) Holger Rune	7	Italian Open, Italy	Clay	F	7–5, 7–5	3	
36.	Andrey Rublev	8	US Open, United States	Hard	QF	6–4, 6–3, 6–4	3	
37.	(Spain) Carlos Alcaraz	1	US Open, United States	Hard	SF	7–6^{(7–3)}, 6–1, 3–6, 6–3	3	
38.	(Germany) Alexander Zverev	10	China Open, China	Hard	SF	6–4, 6–3	3	
39.	(Greece) Stefanos Tsitsipas	7	Vienna Open, Austria	Hard (i)	SF	6–4, 7–6^{(8–6)}	3	
40.	Andrey Rublev	5	ATP Finals, Italy	Hard (i)	RR	6–4, 6–2	3	
41.	(Germany) Alexander Zverev	7	ATP Finals, Italy	Hard (i)	RR	7–6^{(9–7)}, 6–4	3	
2024
42.	(Poland) Hubert Hurkacz	9	Australian Open, Australia	Hard	QF	7–6^{(7–4)}, 2–6, 6–3, 5–7, 6–4	3	
43.	(Germany) Alexander Zverev	6	Australian Open, Australia	Hard	SF	5–7, 3–6, 7–6^{(7–4)}, 7–6^{(7–5)}, 6–3	3	
44.	(Denmark) Holger Rune	7	Indian Wells Open, United States	Hard	QF	7–5, 6–4	4	
45.	(Bulgaria) Grigor Dimitrov	10	Wimbledon, United Kingdom	Grass	4R	5–3 ret.	5	
46.	(Italy) Jannik Sinner	1	Wimbledon, United Kingdom	Grass	QF	6–7^{(7–9)}, 6–4, 7–6^{(7–4)}, 2–6, 6–3	5	
47.	(Australia) Alex de Minaur	9	ATP Finals, Italy	Hard (i)	RR	6–2, 6–4	4	
2025
48.	(Germany) Alexander Zverev	3	Halle Open, Germany	Grass	SF	7–6^{(7–3)}, 6–7^{(1–7)}, 6–4	11	
49.	(Germany) Alexander Zverev	3	China Open, China	Hard	QF	6–3, 6–3	18	
50.	(Australia) Alex de Minaur	7	Shanghai Masters, China	Hard	QF	6–4, 6–4	18	
2026
51.	(Canada) Félix Auger-Aliassime	8	Dubai Tennis Championships, UAE	Hard	SF	6–4, 6–2	11	
52.	(Spain) Carlos Alcaraz	1	Indian Wells Open, United States	Hard	SF	6–3, 7–6^{(7–3)}	11	
53.	(Italy) Flavio Cobolli	6	ATP Finals, Italy	Hard (i)	RR	7–6^{(7–4)}, 6–3	5	
54.	(United States) Frances Tiafoe	8	ATP Finals, Italy	Hard (i)	RR	6–3, 6–4	5	

== Double-bagel matches ==
=== Singles ===
Result	W–L	Year	Tournament	Tier	Surface	Opponent	Rk	Rd
Loss	0–1	2026	Monte-Carlo Masters, France	Masters 1000	Clay	(Italy) Matteo Berrettini	90	2R

== Grand Slam tournament seedings ==
The tournaments won by Medvedev are in boldface, and advanced into finals by Medvedev are in italics.

Legend seeded **No. 1** (0 / 1) seeded No. 2 (**1** / 6) seeded No. 3 (0 / 4) seeded No. 4–10 (0 / 13) seeded No. 11–32 (0 / 6) unseeded (0 / 8)	Longest / total: 1 / 37; 5 / 37; 3 / 37; 4 / 37; 3 / 37; 8 / 37

Year	Australian Open	French Open	Wimbledon	US Open
2016	did not play	did not play	did not qualify	did not qualify
2017	not seeded	not seeded	not seeded	not seeded
2018	not seeded	not seeded	not seeded	not seeded
2019	15th	12th	11th	5th (1)
2020	4th	4th	tournament cancelled*	3rd
2021	4th (2)	2nd	2nd	**2nd (1)**
2022	2nd (3)	2nd	Russian players banned	1st
2023	7th	2nd	3rd	3rd (4)
2024	3rd (5)	5th	5th	5th
2025	5th	11th	9th	13th
2026	11th	6th	8th	7th
2027				

* Due to the COVID-19 pandemic, the 2020 Wimbledon Championships of the tournament was cancelled.

== National and international participation ==
=== Team competitions finals: 4 (4 titles) ===
Result	Year	Tournament	Team	Partners	Opponent team	Opponent players	Surface	Score
Win	2021	ATP Cup	Russia	Andrey Rublev; Aslan Karatsev; Evgeny Donskoy	Italy	Matteo Berrettini; Fabio Fognini; Simone Bolelli; Andrea Vavassori	Hard	2–0
Win	2021	Laver Cup	Team Europe	Stefanos Tsitsipas; Alexander Zverev; Andrey Rublev; Matteo Berrettini; Casper Ruud	Team World	Félix Auger-Aliassime; Denis Shapovalov; Diego Schwartzman; Reilly Opelka; John Isner; Nick Kyrgios	Hard (i)	14–1
Win	2021	Davis Cup	RTF	Andrey Rublev; Aslan Karatsev; Karen Khachanov; Evgeny Donskoy	Croatia	Marin Čilić; Nino Serdarušić; Borna Gojo; Nikola Mektić; Mate Pavić	Hard (i)	2–0
Win	2024	Laver Cup	Team Europe	Carlos Alcaraz; Alexander Zverev; Casper Ruud; Stefanos Tsitsipas; Grigor Dimitrov	Team World	Taylor Fritz; Frances Tiafoe; Ben Shelton; Alejandro Tabilo; Francisco Cerúndolo; Thanasi Kokkinakis	Hard (i)	13–11

=== Davis Cup (3–3) ===
Group membership World Group (0–1) WG Play-off / Qualifiers (1–1) Group I (2–1)	Matches by surface Hard (3–2) Clay (0–1) Grass (0–0)	Matches by type Singles (3–2) Doubles (0–1)

- ▲ ▼ indicates the outcome of the Davis Cup match followed by the score, date, place of event, the zonal classification and its phase, and the court surface.

Rubber outcome	No.	Rubber	Match type (partner if any)	Opponent nation	Opponent player(s)	Score
▼1–4; 3–5 February 2017; Čair Sports Center, Niš, Serbia; World Group; hard(i) surface
Defeat	1	II	Singles	Serbia	Novak Djokovic	6–3, 4–6, 1–6, 0–1 ret.
Victory	2	V	Singles	Serbia	Nenad Zimonjić	w/o
▼1–3; 15–17 September 2017; Kopaszi Dam, Budapest, Hungary; World Group play-off; clay surface
Defeat	3	III	Doubles (with Konstantin Kravchuk)	Hungary	Attila Balázs / Márton Fucsovics	6–7^{(4–7)}, 4–6, 6–7^{(4–7)}
▼1–3; 6–7 April 2018; Luzhniki Small Sports Arena, Moscow, Russia; Europe/Africa second round; hard(i) surface
Victory	4	II	Singles	Austria	Sebastian Ofner	6–1, 6–2
▲3–2; 14–15 September 2018; Luzhniki Small Sports Arena, Moscow, Russia; Europe/Africa first-round play-off; hard(i) surface
Defeat	5	II	Singles	Belarus	Ilya Ivashka	6–7^{(2–7)}, 4–6
Victory	6	V	Singles	Belarus	Egor Gerasimov	7–6^{(7–4)}, 3–6, 6–3
▲3–1; 1–2 February 2019; Swiss Tennis Arena, Biel/Bienne, Switzerland; qualifying round; hard(i) surface
Victory	7	I	Singles	Switzerland	Henri Laaksonen	7–6^{(10–8)}, 6–7^{(6–8)}, 6–2

=== ATP Cup (9–2) ===
Matches by type
Singles (8–1)
Doubles (1–1)

Result	No.	Rubber	Match type (partner if any)	Opponent nation	Opponent player(s)	Score
▲8–1; 3–7 January 2020; Perth Arena, Perth, Australia; group stage; hard surface
Victory	1	II	Singles	Italy	Fabio Fognini	1–6, 6–1, 6–3
Victory	2	III	Doubles (with Karen Khachanov)	Italy	Simone Bolelli / Paolo Lorenzi	6–4, 6–3
Victory	3	II	Singles	United States	John Isner	6–3, 6–1
Defeat	4	III	Doubles (with Karen Khachanov)	United States	Austin Krajicek / Rajeev Ram	3–6, 4–6
Victory	5	II	Singles	Norway	Casper Ruud	6–3, 7–6^{(8–6)}
3–3; 9–11 January 2020; Ken Rosewall Arena, Sydney, Australia; Knockout stage; hard surface
Victory	6	II	Singles	Argentina	Diego Schwartzman	6–4, 4–6, 6–3
Defeat	7	II	Singles	Serbia	Novak Djokovic	1–6, 7–5, 4–6
▲4–2; 2–3 February 2021; Melbourne Park, Melbourne, Australia; group stage; hard surface
Victory	8	II	Singles	Argentina	Diego Schwartzman	7–5, 6–3
Victory	9	II	Singles	Japan	Kei Nishikori	6–2, 6–4
▲4–1; 6–7 February 2021; Melbourne Park, Melbourne, Australia; Knockout stage; hard surface
Victory	10	II	Singles	Germany	Alexander Zverev	3–6, 6–3, 7–5
Victory	11	II	Singles	Italy	Matteo Berrettini	6–4, 6–2

=== Laver Cup (1–2) ===
Matches by type
Singles (1–2)
Doubles (0–0)

Result	No.	Day	Match type (partner if any)	Opponent player(s)	Score
▲14–1; 24–26 September 2021; TD Garden, Boston, United States; hard (i) surface
Victory	1	2 (2 points)	Singles	(Canada) Denis Shapovalov	6–4, 6–0
▲13–11; 20–22 September 2024; Uber Arena, Berlin, Germany; hard (i) surface
Defeat	2	2 (2 points)	Singles	(United States) Frances Tiafoe	6–3, 4–6, [5–10]
Defeat	3	3 (3 points)	Singles	(United States) Ben Shelton	7–6^{(8–6)}, 5–7, [7–10]

== Longest winning streaks ==
=== 20 match win streak (2020–21) ===
#	Tournament	Category	Start date	Surface	Rd	Opponent	Rank	Score
–	Vienna Open	ATP 500	26 October 2020	Hard	QF	(South Africa) Kevin Anderson (PR)	No. 111	4–6, 6–7^{(5–7)}
1	Paris Masters	ATP 1000	2 November 2020	Hard	2R	(South Africa) Kevin Anderson (SE)	No. 86	6–6 ret.
2	Paris Masters	ATP 1000	2 November 2020	Hard	3R	(Australia) Alex de Minaur (16)	No. 25	5–7, 6–2, 6–2
3	Paris Masters	ATP 1000	2 November 2020	Hard	QF	(Argentina) Diego Schwartzman (6)	No. 9	6–3, 6–1
4	Paris Masters	ATP 1000	2 November 2020	Hard	SF	(Canada) Milos Raonic (10)	No. 17	6–4, 7–6^{(7–4)}
5	Paris Masters	ATP 1000	2 November 2020	Hard	F	(Germany) Alexander Zverev (4)	No. 7	5–7, 6–4, 6–1
6	ATP Finals	Tour Finals	16 November 2020	Hard	RR	(Argentina) Diego Schwartzman (8)	No. 9	6–3, 6–3
7	ATP Finals	Tour Finals	16 November 2020	Hard	RR	(Germany) Alexander Zverev (5)	No. 7	6–3, 6–4
8	ATP Finals	Tour Finals	16 November 2020	Hard	RR	(Serbia) Novak Djokovic (1)	No. 1	6–3, 6–3
9	ATP Finals	Tour Finals	16 November 2020	Hard	SF	(Spain) Rafael Nadal (2)	No. 2	3–6, 7–6^{(7–4)}, 6–3
10	ATP Finals	Tour Finals	16 November 2020	Hard	F	(Austria) Dominic Thiem (3)	No. 3	4–6, 7–6^{(7–2)}, 6–4
11	ATP Cup	ATP Cup	2 February 2021	Hard	RR	(Argentina) Diego Schwartzman	No. 9	7–5, 6–3
12	ATP Cup	ATP Cup	2 February 2021	Hard	RR	(Japan) Kei Nishikori (PR)	No. 41	6–2, 6–4
13	ATP Cup	ATP Cup	2 February 2021	Hard	SF	(Germany) Alexander Zverev	No. 7	3–6, 6–3, 7–5
14	ATP Cup	ATP Cup	2 February 2021	Hard	F	(Italy) Matteo Berrettini	No. 10	6–4, 6–2
15	Australian Open	Grand Slam	8 February 2021	Hard	1R	(Canada) Vasek Pospisil	No. 63	6–2, 6–2, 6–4
16	Australian Open	Grand Slam	8 February 2021	Hard	2R	(Spain) Roberto Carballés Baena	No. 99	6–2, 7–5, 6–1
17	Australian Open	Grand Slam	8 February 2021	Hard	3R	(Serbia) Filip Krajinović (28)	No. 33	6–3, 6–3, 4–6, 3–6, 6–0
18	Australian Open	Grand Slam	8 February 2021	Hard	4R	(United States) Mackenzie McDonald (PR)	No. 192	6–4, 6–2, 6–3
19	Australian Open	Grand Slam	8 February 2021	Hard	QF	(Russia) Andrey Rublev (7)	No. 8	7–5, 6–3, 6–2
20	Australian Open	Grand Slam	8 February 2021	Hard	SF	(Greece) Stefanos Tsitsipas (5)	No. 6	6–4, 6–2, 7–5
ended	Australian Open	Grand Slam	8 February 2021	Hard	F	(Serbia) Novak Djokovic (1)	No. 1	5–7, 2–6, 2–6

=== 19 match win streak (2023) ===
#	Tournament	Category	Start date	Surface	Rd	Opponent	Rank	Score
–	Australian Open	Grand Slam	16 January 2023	Hard	3R	(United States) Sebastian Korda (29)	No. 31	6–7^{(7–9)}, 3–6, 6–7^{(4–7)}
1	Rotterdam Open	ATP 500	13 February 2023	Hard	1R	(Spain) Alejandro Davidovich Fokina	No. 31	4–6, 6–2, 6–2
2	Rotterdam Open	ATP 500	13 February 2023	Hard	2R	(Netherlands) Botic van de Zandschulp	No. 35	6–2, 6–2
3	Rotterdam Open	ATP 500	13 February 2023	Hard	QF	(Canada) Félix Auger-Aliassime (3)	No. 8	6–2, 6–4
4	Rotterdam Open	ATP 500	13 February 2023	Hard	SF	(Bulgaria) Grigor Dimitrov	No. 28	6–1, 6–2
5	Rotterdam Open	ATP 500	13 February 2023	Hard	F	(Italy) Jannik Sinner	No. 14	5–7, 6–2, 6–2
6	Qatar Open	ATP 250	20 February 2023	Hard	1R	(United Kingdom) Liam Broady (Q)	No. 147	6–4, 6–3
7	Qatar Open	ATP 250	20 February 2023	Hard	QF	(Australia) Christopher O'Connell	No. 94	6–4, 4–6, 7–5
8	Qatar Open	ATP 250	20 February 2023	Hard	SF	(Canada) Félix Auger-Aliassime (2)	No. 9	6–4, 7–6^{(9–7)}
9	Qatar Open	ATP 250	20 February 2023	Hard	F	(United Kingdom) Andy Murray (WC)	No. 70	6–4, 6–4
10	Dubai Championships	ATP 500	27 February 2023	Hard	1R	(Italy) Matteo Arnaldi (Q)	No. 111	6–4, 6–2
11	Dubai Championships	ATP 500	27 February 2023	Hard	2R	(Kazakhstan) Alexander Bublik	No. 46	6–4, 6–2
12	Dubai Championships	ATP 500	27 February 2023	Hard	QF	(Croatia) Borna Ćorić (8)	No. 20	6–3, 6–2
13	Dubai Championships	ATP 500	27 February 2023	Hard	SF	(Serbia) Novak Djokovic (1)	No. 1	6–4, 6–4
14	Dubai Championships	ATP 500	27 February 2023	Hard	F	(Russia) Andrey Rublev (2)	No. 6	6–2, 6–2
15	Indian Wells Open	ATP 1000	6 March 2023	Hard	2R	(United States) Brandon Nakashima	No. 48	6–4, 6–3
16	Indian Wells Open	ATP 1000	6 March 2023	Hard	3R	(Belarus) Ilya Ivashka	No. 85	6–2, 3–6, 6–1
17	Indian Wells Open	ATP 1000	6 March 2023	Hard	4R	(Germany) Alexander Zverev (12)	No. 14	6–7^{(5–7)}, 7–6^{(7–5)}, 7–5
18	Indian Wells Open	ATP 1000	6 March 2023	Hard	QF	(Spain) Alejandro Davidovich Fokina (23)	No. 28	6–3, 7–5
19	Indian Wells Open	ATP 1000	6 March 2023	Hard	SF	(United States) Frances Tiafoe (14)	No. 16	7–5, 7–6^{(7–4)}
ended	Indian Wells Open	ATP 1000	6 March 2023	Hard	F	(Spain) Carlos Alcaraz (1)	No. 2	3–6, 2–6

== ATP Tour career earnings ==
Year	Majors	ATP wins	Total wins	Earnings ($)	Money list rank
2011	0	0	0	435
2012	0	0	0	0
2013	0	0	0	0
2014	0	0	0	5,660	n/a
2015	0	0	0	22,729	431
2016	0	0	0	160,555	177
2017	0	0	0	749,987	65
2018	0	3	3	1,665,414	25
2019	0	4	4	7,902,912	5
2020	0	2	2	3,622,891	4
2021	1	3	4	7,481,274	2
2022	0	2	2	4,178,524	9
2023	0	5	5	11,548,023	3
2024	0	0	0	$6,519,660	5
2025	0	1	1	$3,512,178	12
2026	0	4	4	$4,514,763	4
Career	1	24	25	$55,060,133	8

* Statistics correct as of 9 November 2026.

== Exhibition matches ==
=== Singles ===
Result	Date	Tournament	Surface	Opponent	Score
Win	Dec 2019	Diriyah Tennis Cup, Saudi Arabia	Hard	(Italy) Fabio Fognini	6–2, 6–2
Loss	Mar 2023	Tennis Showdown Exhibition, Mexico	Hard	Andrey Rublev	4–6, 6–2, 6–7^{(4–7)}
Loss	Jun 2024	Giorgio Armani Tennis Classic, London, United Kingdom	Grass	(Serbia) Novak Djokovic	3–6, 4–6
Loss	Oct 2024	2024 Six Kings Slam, Riyadh, Saudi Arabia	Hard	(Italy) Jannik Sinner	0–6, 3–6

=== Team competitions ===
Result	Date	Tournament	Surface	Team	Partner(s)	Opponent team	Opponent players	Score
Win	Dec 2023	World Tennis League, Abu Dhabi, United Arab Emirates	Hard	PBG Eagle	Andrey Rublev; Sofia Kenin; Mirra Andreeva	SG Mavericks Kites	Grigor Dimitrov; Stefanos Tsitsipas; Aryna Sabalenka; Paula Badosa	29–26

== See also ==
- List of ATP number 1 ranked singles tennis players
- List of highest ranked tennis players per country
- ATP Finals appearances
- Russia Davis Cup team
- Sport in Russia
