= Aryna Sabalenka career statistics =

Belarusian tennis player's statistics

Career finals
Discipline	Type	Won	Lost	Total
Singles	Grand Slam	4	5	9
Singles	WTA Finals	–	2	2
Singles	WTA Elite	1	–	1
Singles	WTA 1000 (Note: Formerly known as: Tier I (1990–2008); WTA Premier Mandatory & Premier 5 (2009–2020))	11	4	15
Singles	WTA 500 (Note: Formerly known as: Tier II (until 2009); WTA Premier (2009–2021))	6	7	13
Singles	WTA 250 (Note: Formerly known as: Tier III, IV & V (until 2009); WTA International (until 2021))	2	3	5
Singles	Olympics	–	–	–
Singles	Total	24	21	45
Doubles	Grand Slam	2	–	2
Doubles	WTA Finals	–	–	–
Doubles	WTA Elite	–	–	–
Doubles	WTA 1000	2	1	3
Doubles	WTA 500	2	–	2
Doubles	WTA 250	–	1	1
Doubles	Olympics	–	–	–
Doubles	Total	6	2	8

This is a list of the main career statistics of professional Belarusian tennis player Aryna Sabalenka.

== Career achievements ==
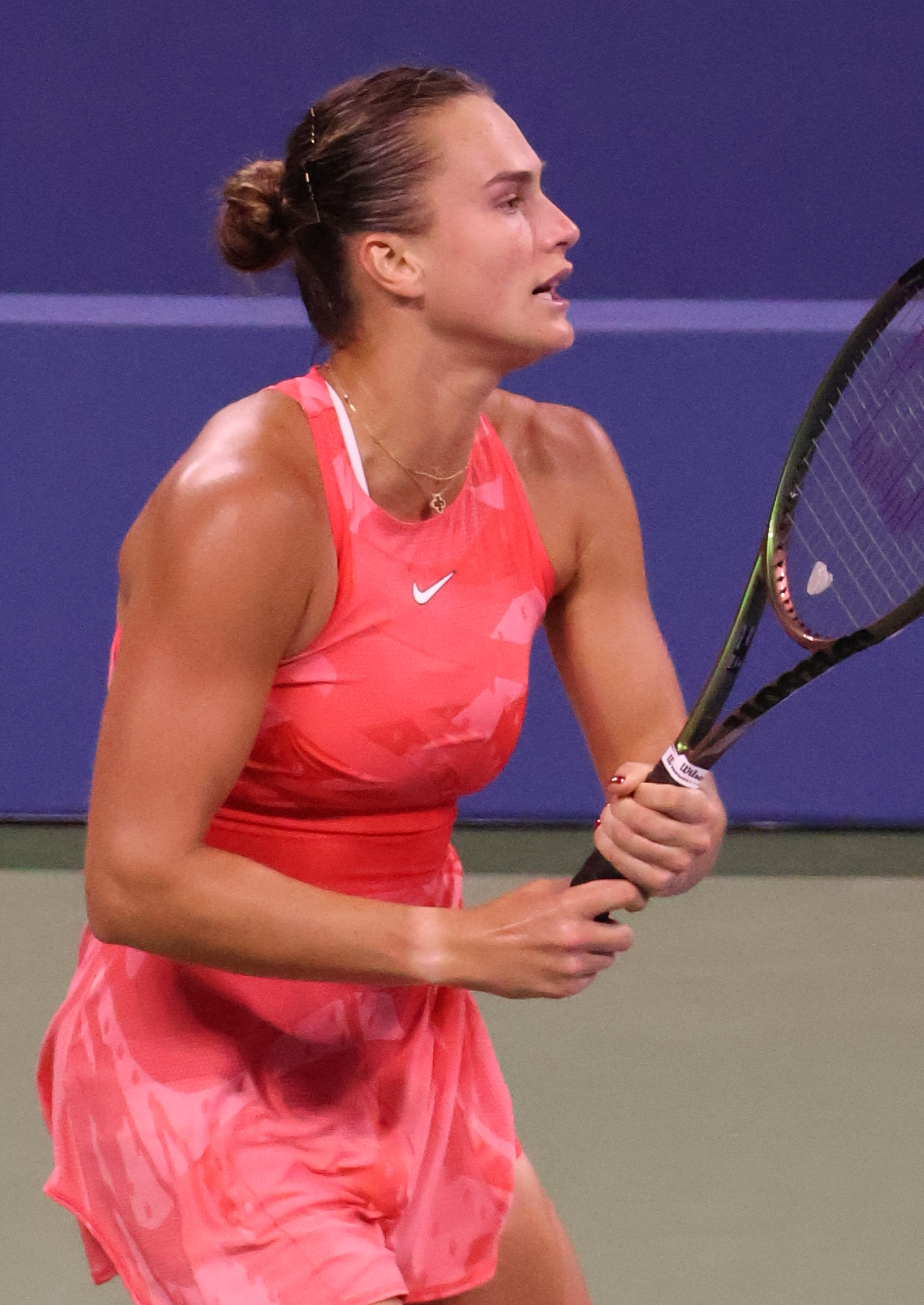
Sabalenka at the 2023 US Open

She has won twenty-four singles and six doubles titles on the WTA Tour. Her most significant career achievements are the back-to-back major titles in singles at Australian Open (2023, 2024) and US Open (2024, 2025). In doubles, her best results are the 2019 US Open and 2021 Australian Open titles, won alongside Elise Mertens. She also has won two WTA 1000 titles in doubles at the Indian Wells Open and Miami Open in 2019. In singles, she has won eleven WTA 1000 tournaments at the Wuhan Open in 2018, 2019 and 2024, at the Qatar Open in 2020, at the Madrid Open in 2021, 2023 and 2025, at the Cincinnati Open in 2024, at the Miami Open in 2025 and 2026, and at Indian Wells Open in 2026.

In 2019, she won the WTA Elite Trophy in singles, defeating Kiki Bertens in the final. Playing for Belarus in Fed Cup, Sabalenka reached the final in 2017, but the team lost to United States. Two-years later, Belarus reached the semifinals, also with Sabalenka in their team. She achieved world No. 1 in both singles and doubles. Sabalenka has reached No. 1 in singles on 11 September 2023 and held it for a total of 96 weeks, while in doubles she reached No. 1 on 21 February 2021 and held it for a total of 6 weeks.

== Performance timelines ==
Key
W	F	SF	QF	#R	RR	Q#	P#	DNQ	A	Z#	PO	G	S	B	NMS	NTI	P	NH

(W) winner; (F) finalist; (SF) semifinalist; (QF) quarterfinalist; (#R) rounds 4, 3, 2, 1; (RR) round-robin stage; (Q#) qualification round; (P#) preliminary round; (DNQ) did not qualify; (A) absent; (Z#) Davis/Fed Cup Zonal Group (with number indication) or (PO) play-off; (G) gold, (S) silver or (B) bronze Olympic/Paralympic medal; (NMS) not a Masters tournament; (NTI) not a Tier I tournament; (P) postponed; (NH) not held; (SR) strike rate (events won / competed); (W–L) win–loss record.
To avoid confusion and double counting, these charts are updated at the conclusion of a tournament or when the player's participation has ended.

Only main-draw results in WTA Tour, Grand Slam tournaments, Billie Jean King Cup (Fed Cup), United Cup, Hopman Cup and Olympic Games are included in win–loss records.

=== Singles ===
Current through the 2026 US Open.

Tournament	2017	2018	2019	2020	2021	2022	2023	2024	2025	2026	SR	W–L	Win %
Grand Slam tournaments
Australian Open	Q2	1R	3R	1R	4R	4R	W	W	F	F	2 / 9	34–7	83%
French Open	Q1	1R	2R	3R	3R	3R	SF	QF	F	QF	0 / 9	26–9	74%
Wimbledon	2R	1R	1R	NH	SF	A (Note: Suspended due to the ban of Russian and Belarusian athletes in light of the Russian invasion of Ukraine.)	SF	A	SF	4R	0 / 7	19–7	73%
US Open	Q1	4R	2R	2R	SF	SF	F	W	W (Note: Received a walkover in the quarterfinals, which does not count as a win.)	F	2 / 9	40–7	85%
Win–loss	1–1	3–4	4–4	3–3	15–4	10–3	23–3	18–1	23–3	19–4	4 / 34	119–30	80%
Year-end championships
WTA Finals	DNQ			NH	RR	F	SF	SF	F		0 / 5	12–9	57%
WTA Elite Trophy	DNQ	RR	W	NH			A	NH			1 / 2	5–1	83%
National representation
Billie Jean King Cup	F	1R	SF	RR (Note: Edition is split into the two years due to COVID-19.)		Disqualified					0 / 4	10–6	63%
Summer Olympics	NH				2R	NH		A	NH		0 / 1	1–1	50%
WTA 1000 tournaments
Qatar Open	NTI	A	NTI	W	NTI	QF	NTI	A	2R	A	1 / 3	7–2	78%
Dubai Championships	1R	NTI	3R	NTI	QF	NTI	QF	2R	3R	A	0 / 6	6–6	50%
Indian Wells Open	A	3R	4R	NH	A	2R	F	4R	F	W	1 / 6	21–6	78%
Miami Open	A	2R	2R	NH	QF	2R	QF	3R	W	W	2 / 7	20–6	77%
Madrid Open	A	1R	1R	NH	W	1R	W	F	W	QF	3 / 8	26–5	84%
Italian Open	A	1R	1R	A	3R	SF	2R	F	QF	3R	0 / 8	13–8	62%
Canadian Open	A	3R	1R	NH	SF	3R	3R	QF	A	4R	0 / 7	11–7	61%
Cincinnati Open	Q2	SF	3R	3R	2R	SF	SF	W	QF	4R	1 / 9	23–8	74%
China Open	Q1	QF	2R	NH			QF	QF	A	3R	0 / 5	9–5	64%
Wuhan Open	A	W	W	NH				W	SF	2R	3 / 5	20–2	91%
Win–loss	0–1	17–7	11–8	6–1	15–5	9–7	22–7	28–7	27–6	21–6	11 / 65	156–54	74%
Career statistics
	2017	2018	2019	2020	2021	2022	2023	2024	2025	2026	SR	W–L	Win%
Tournaments	5	23	24	12	19	21	16	17	16	15	Career total: 166		
Titles	0	2	3	3	2	0	3	4	4	3	Career total: 24		
Finals	1	4	4	3	3	3	6	7	9	4	Career total: 44		
Hard win–loss	11–7	35–13	32–13	23–7	25–12	20–15	35–9	40–9	39–7	37–7	21 / 110	291–99	75%
Clay win–loss	0–0	4–5	5–5	6–3	13–3	9–5	15–3	15–4	17–3	8–3	3 / 35	92–34	73%
Grass win–loss	1–1	7–4	2–4	0–0	7–3	4–2	6–2	1–1	7–2	5–2	0 / 21	40–21	66%
Overall win–loss	12–8	46–22	39–22	29–10	45–18	33–22	56–14	56–14	63–12	47–11	24 / 167	425–153	74%
Win %	60%	68%	64%	74%	71%	60%	80%	80%	84%	81%	Career total: 74%		
Year-end ranking (Note: 2015: WTA ranking – 548.)	78	11	11	10	2	5	2	1	1	3	$46,789,918		

=== Doubles ===
Current after the 2024 WTA Tour.

Tournament	2017	2018	2019	2020	2021	2022	2023	SR	W–L	Win %
Grand Slam tournaments
Australian Open	A	1R	3R	QF	W	A	A	1 / 4	10–3	77%
French Open	A	A	SF	2R	A	A	A	0 / 2	5–2	71%
Wimbledon	A	2R	QF	NH	A	A	A	0 / 2	4–2	67%
US Open	A	3R	W	QF	A	A	A	1 / 3	10–2	83%
Win–loss	0–0	3–3	15–3	6–3	5–0	0–0	0–0	2 / 11	29–9	76%
Year-end championships
WTA Finals	DNQ		RR	NH	DNQ			0 / 1	1–2	33%
WTA 1000 tournaments
Qatar Open	NTI	A	NTI	QF	NTI	A	NTI	0 / 1	1–1	50%
Dubai Championships	A	NTI	A	NTI	2R	NTI	A	0 / 1	0–1	0%
Indian Wells Open	A	2R	W	NH	A	A	A	1 / 2	6–1	86%
Miami Open	A	1R	W	NH	1R	2R	A	1 / 4	6–3	67%
Madrid Open	A	A	2R	NH	A	1R	A	0 / 2	0–2	0%
Italian Open	A	A	2R	A	A	A	A	0 / 2	0–2	0%
Canadian Open	A	1R	A	NH	QF	A	A	0 / 2	1–2	33%
Cincinnati Open	A	1R	2R	QF	A	A	A	0 / 3	2–2	50%
China Open	A	A	2R	NH			A	0 / 1	0–1	0%
Wuhan Open	A	2R	F	NH				0 / 2	4–2	67%
Career statistics
	2017	2018	2019	2020	2021	2022	2023	SR	W–L	Win %
Tournaments	3	15	13	8	5	4	1	Career total: 49		
Titles	0	0	3	1	2	0	0	Career total: 6		
Finals	0	1	4	1	2	0	0	Career total: 8		
Overall win–loss	2–4	14–16	30–12	15–6	10–3	2–3	3–1	5 / 49	90–67	57%
Win %	33%	47%	71%	71%	77%	40%	75%	Career total: 57%		
Year-end ranking	444	61	5	5	28	319	409			

== Grand Slam tournament finals ==
=== Singles: 9 (4 titles, 5 runner-ups) ===
Result	Year	Tournament	Surface	Opponent	Score
Win	2023	Australian Open	Hard	(Kazakhstan) Elena Rybakina	4–6, 6–3, 6–4
Loss	2023	US Open	Hard	(United States) Coco Gauff	6–2, 3–6, 2–6
Win	2024	Australian Open (2)	Hard	(China) Zheng Qinwen	6–3, 6–2
Win	2024	US Open	Hard	(United States) Jessica Pegula	7–5, 7–5
Loss	2025	Australian Open	Hard	(United States) Madison Keys	3–6, 6–2, 5–7
Loss	2025	French Open	Clay	(United States) Coco Gauff	7–6^{(7–5)}, 2–6, 4–6
Win	2025	US Open (2)	Hard	(United States) Amanda Anisimova	6–3, 7–6^{(7–3)}
Loss	2026	Australian Open	Hard	(Kazakhstan) Elena Rybakina	4–6, 6–4, 4–6
Loss	2026	US Open	Hard	(Kazakhstan) Elena Rybakina	4–6, 7–5, 2–6

=== Doubles: 2 (2 titles) ===
Result	Year	Tournament	Surface	Partner	Opponents	Score
Win	2019	US Open	Hard	(Belgium) Elise Mertens	(Belarus) Victoria Azarenka (Australia) Ashleigh Barty	7–5, 7–5
Win	2021	Australian Open	Hard	(Belgium) Elise Mertens	(Czech Republic) Barbora Krejčíková (Czech Republic) Kateřina Siniaková	6–2, 6–3

== Other significant finals ==
=== Year-end championships (WTA Finals) ===
==== Singles: 2 (2 runner-ups) ====
Result	Year	Tournament	Surface	Opponent	Score
Loss	2022	WTA Finals, United States	Hard (i)	(France) Caroline Garcia	6–7^{(4–7)}, 4–6
Loss	2025	WTA Finals, Saudi Arabia	Hard (i)	(Kazakhstan) Elena Rybakina	3–6, 6–7^{(0–7)}

=== WTA Elite Trophy ===
==== Singles: 1 (title) ====
Result	Year	Tournament	Surface	Opponent	Score
Win	2019	WTA Elite Trophy	Hard (i)	(Netherlands) Kiki Bertens	6–4, 6–2

=== WTA 1000 tournaments ===
==== Singles: 15 (11 titles, 4 runner-ups) ====
Result	Year	Tournament	Surface	Opponent	Score
Win	2018	Wuhan Open	Hard	(Estonia) Anett Kontaveit	6–3, 6–3
Win	2019	Wuhan Open (2)	Hard	(United States) Alison Riske	6–3, 3–6, 6–1
Win	2020	Qatar Open	Hard	(Czech Republic) Petra Kvitová	6–3, 6–3
Win	2021	Madrid Open	Clay	(Australia) Ashleigh Barty	6–0, 3–6, 6–4
Loss	2023	Indian Wells Open	Hard	(Kazakhstan) Elena Rybakina	6–7^{(11–13)}, 4–6
Win	2023	Madrid Open (2)	Clay	(Poland) Iga Świątek	6–3, 3–6, 6–3
Loss	2024	Madrid Open	Clay	(Poland) Iga Świątek	5–7, 6–4, 6–7^{(7–9)}
Loss	2024	Italian Open	Clay	(Poland) Iga Świątek	2–6, 3–6
Win	2024	Cincinnati Open	Hard	(United States) Jessica Pegula	6–3, 7–5
Win	2024	Wuhan Open (3)	Hard	(China) Zheng Qinwen	6–3, 5–7, 6–3
Loss	2025	Indian Wells Open	Hard	Mirra Andreeva	6–2, 4–6, 3–6
Win	2025	Miami Open	Hard	(United States) Jessica Pegula	7–5, 6–2
Win	2025	Madrid Open (3)	Clay	(United States) Coco Gauff	6–3, 7–6^{(7–3)}
Win	2026	Indian Wells Open	Hard	(Kazakhstan) Elena Rybakina	3–6, 6–3, 7–6^{(8–6)}
Win	2026	Miami Open (2)	Hard	(United States) Coco Gauff	6–2, 4–6, 6–3

==== Doubles: 3 (2 titles, 1 runner-up) ====
Result	Year	Tournament	Surface	Partner	Opponents	Score
Win	2019	Indian Wells Open	Hard	(Belgium) Elise Mertens	(Czech Republic) Barbora Krejčíková (Czech Republic) Kateřina Siniaková	6–3, 6–2
Win	2019	Miami Open	Hard	(Belgium) Elise Mertens	(Australia) Samantha Stosur (China) Zhang Shuai	7–6^{(7–5)}, 6–2
Loss	2019	Wuhan Open	Hard	(Belgium) Elise Mertens	(China) Duan Yingying (Russia) Veronika Kudermetova	6–7^{(3–7)}, 2–6

== WTA Tour finals ==
=== Singles: 45 (24 titles, 21 runner-ups) ===
Legend Grand Slam tournaments (4–5) WTA Finals (0–2) WTA Elite Trophy (1–0) Premier Mandatory & Premier 5 / WTA 1000 (11–4) Premier / WTA 500 (6–7) International / WTA 250 (2–3)	Finals by surface Hard (21–11) Clay (3–8) Grass (0–2)	Finals by setting Outdoor (21–15) Indoor (3–6)

Result	W–L	Date	Tournament	Tier	Surface	Opponent	Score
Loss	0–1	Oct 2017	Tianjin Open, China	International	Hard	(Russia) Maria Sharapova	5–7, 6–7^{(8–10)}
Loss	0–2	Apr 2018	Lugano Open, Switzerland	International	Clay	(Belgium) Elise Mertens	5–7, 2–6
Loss	0–3	Jun 2018	Eastbourne International, United Kingdom	Premier	Grass	(Denmark) Caroline Wozniacki	5–7, 6–7^{(5–7)}
Win	1–3	Aug 2018	Connecticut Open, United States	Premier	Hard	(Spain) Carla Suárez Navarro	6–1, 6–4
Win	2–3	Sep 2018	Wuhan Open, China	Premier 5	Hard	(Estonia) Anett Kontaveit	6–3, 6–3
Win	3–3	Jan 2019	Shenzhen Open, China	International	Hard	(United States) Alison Riske	4–6, 7–6^{(7–2)}, 6–3
Loss	3–4	Aug 2019	Silicon Valley Classic, US	Premier	Hard	(China) Zheng Saisai	3–6, 6–7^{(3–7)}
Win	4–4	Sep 2019	Wuhan Open, China (2)	Premier 5	Hard	(United States) Alison Riske	6–3, 3–6, 6–1
Win	5–4	Oct 2019	WTA Elite Trophy, China	Elite	Hard (i)	(Netherlands) Kiki Bertens	6–4, 6–2
Win	6–4	Feb 2020	Qatar Open, Qatar	Premier 5	Hard	(Czech Republic) Petra Kvitová	6–3, 6–3
Win	7–4	Oct 2020	Ostrava Open, Czech Republic	Premier	Hard (i)	(Belarus) Victoria Azarenka	6–2, 6–2
Win	8–4	Nov 2020	Linz Open, Austria	International	Hard (i)	(Belgium) Elise Mertens	7–5, 6–2
Win	9–4	Jan 2021	Abu Dhabi Open, UAE	WTA 500	Hard	(Russia) Veronika Kudermetova	6–2, 6–2
Loss	9–5	Apr 2021	Stuttgart Open, Germany	WTA 500	Clay (i)	(Australia) Ashleigh Barty	6–3, 0–6, 3–6
Win	10–5	May 2021	Madrid Open, Spain	WTA 1000	Clay	(Australia) Ashleigh Barty	6–0, 3–6, 6–4
Loss	10–6	Apr 2022	Stuttgart Open, Germany	WTA 500	Clay (i)	(Poland) Iga Świątek	2–6, 2–6
Loss	10–7	Jun 2022	Rosmalen Open, Netherlands	WTA 250	Grass	Ekaterina Alexandrova	5–7, 0–6
Loss	10–8	Nov 2022	WTA Finals, United States	Finals	Hard (i)	(France) Caroline Garcia	6–7^{(4–7)}, 4–6
Win	11–8	Jan 2023	Adelaide International, Australia	WTA 500	Hard	(Czech Republic) Linda Nosková	6–3, 7–6^{(7–4)}
Win	12–8	Jan 2023	Australian Open, Australia	Grand Slam	Hard	(Kazakhstan) Elena Rybakina	4–6, 6–3, 6–4
Loss	12–9	Mar 2023	Indian Wells Open, US	WTA 1000	Hard	(Kazakhstan) Elena Rybakina	6–7^{(11–13)}, 4–6
Loss	12–10	Apr 2023	Stuttgart Open, Germany	WTA 500	Clay (i)	(Poland) Iga Świątek	3–6, 4–6
Win	13–10	May 2023	Madrid Open, Spain (2)	WTA 1000	Clay	(Poland) Iga Świątek	6–3, 3–6, 6–3
Loss	13–11	Sep 2023	US Open, United States	Grand Slam	Hard	(United States) Coco Gauff	6–2, 3–6, 2–6
Loss	13–12	Jan 2024	Brisbane International, Australia	WTA 500	Hard	(Kazakhstan) Elena Rybakina	0–6, 3–6
Win	14–12	Jan 2024	Australian Open, Australia (2)	Grand Slam	Hard	(China) Zheng Qinwen	6–3, 6–2
Loss	14–13	May 2024	Madrid Open, Spain	WTA 1000	Clay	(Poland) Iga Świątek	5–7, 6–4, 6–7^{(7–9)}
Loss	14–14	May 2024	Italian Open, Italy	WTA 1000	Clay	(Poland) Iga Świątek	2–6, 3–6
Win	15–14	Aug 2024	Cincinnati Open, United States	WTA 1000	Hard	(United States) Jessica Pegula	6–3, 7–5
Win	16–14	Sep 2024	US Open, United States	Grand Slam	Hard	(United States) Jessica Pegula	7–5, 7–5
Win	17–14	Oct 2024	Wuhan Open, China (3)	WTA 1000	Hard	(China) Zheng Qinwen	6–3, 5–7, 6–3
Win	18–14	Jan 2025	Brisbane International, Australia	WTA 500	Hard	Polina Kudermetova	4–6, 6–3, 6–2
Loss	18–15	Jan 2025	Australian Open, Australia	Grand Slam	Hard	(United States) Madison Keys	3–6, 6–2, 5–7
Loss	18–16	Mar 2025	Indian Wells Open, US	WTA 1000	Hard	Mirra Andreeva	6–2, 4–6, 3–6
Win	19–16	Mar 2025	Miami Open, United States	WTA 1000	Hard	(United States) Jessica Pegula	7–5, 6–2
Loss	19–17	Apr 2025	Stuttgart Open, Germany	WTA 500	Clay (i)	(Latvia) Jeļena Ostapenko	4–6, 1–6
Win	20–17	May 2025	Madrid Open, Spain (3)	WTA 1000	Clay	(United States) Coco Gauff	6–3, 7–6^{(7–3)}
Loss	20–18	Jun 2025	French Open, France	Grand Slam	Clay	(United States) Coco Gauff	7–6^{(7–5)}, 2–6, 4–6
Win	21–18	Sep 2025	US Open, United States (2)	Grand Slam	Hard	(United States) Amanda Anisimova	6–3, 7–6^{(7–3)}
Loss	21–19	Nov 2025	WTA Finals, Saudi Arabia	Finals	Hard (i)	(Kazakhstan) Elena Rybakina	3–6, 6–7^{(0–7)}
Win	22–19	Jan 2026	Brisbane International, Australia (2)	WTA 500	Hard	(Ukraine) Marta Kostyuk	6–4, 6–3
Loss	22–20	Jan 2026	Australian Open, Australia	Grand Slam	Hard	(Kazakhstan) Elena Rybakina	4–6, 6–4, 4–6
Win	23–20	Mar 2026	Indian Wells Open, United States	WTA 1000	Hard	(Kazakhstan) Elena Rybakina	3–6, 6–3, 7–6^{(8–6)}
Win	24–20	Mar 2026	Miami Open, United States (2)	WTA 1000	Hard	(United States) Coco Gauff	6–2, 4–6, 6–3
Loss	24–21	Sep 2026	US Open, United States	Grand Slam	Hard	(Kazakhstan) Elena Rybakina	4–6, 7–5, 2–6

=== Doubles: 8 (6 titles, 2 runner-ups) ===
Legend Grand Slam tournaments (2–0) Premier Mandatory & Premier 5 / WTA 1000 (2–1) Premier / WTA 500 (2–0) International / WTA 250 (0–1)	Finals by surface Hard (5–1) Clay (0–1) Grass (1–0)	Finals by setting Outdoor (5–2) Indoor (1–0)

Result	W–L	Date	Tournament	Tier	Surface	Partner	Opponents	Score
Loss	0–1	Apr 2018	Lugano Open, Switzerland	International	Clay	(Belarus) Vera Lapko	(Belgium) Kirsten Flipkens (Belgium) Elise Mertens	1–6, 3–6
Win	1–1	Mar 2019	Indian Wells Open, US	Premier M	Hard	(Belgium) Elise Mertens	(Czech Republic) Barbora Krejčíková (Czech Republic) Kateřina Siniaková	6–3, 6–2
Win	2–1	Mar 2019	Miami Open, US	Premier M	Hard	(Belgium) Elise Mertens	(Australia) Samantha Stosur (China) Zhang Shuai	7–6^{(7–5)}, 6–2
Win	3–1	Sep 2019	US Open, US	Grand Slam	Hard	(Belgium) Elise Mertens	(Belarus) Victoria Azarenka (Australia) Ashleigh Barty	7–5, 7–5
Loss	3–2	Sep 2019	Wuhan Open, China	Premier 5	Hard	(Belgium) Elise Mertens	(China) Duan Yingying (Russia) Veronika Kudermetova	6–7^{(3–7)}, 2–6
Win	4–2	Oct 2020	Ostrava Open, Czech Republic	Premier	Hard (i)	(Belgium) Elise Mertens	(Canada) Gabriela Dabrowski (Brazil) Luisa Stefani	6–1, 6–3
Win	5–2	Feb 2021	Australian Open, Australia	Grand Slam	Hard	(Belgium) Elise Mertens	(Czech Republic) Barbora Krejčíková (Czech Republic) Kateřina Siniaková	6–2, 6–3
Win	6–2	Jun 2021	German Open, Germany	WTA 500	Grass	(Belarus) Victoria Azarenka	(United States) Nicole Melichar (Netherlands) Demi Schuurs	4–6, 7–5, [10–4]

== WTA 125 finals ==
=== Singles: 1 (title) ===
Result	Date	Tournament	Surface	Opponent	Score
Win	Nov 2017	Mumbai Open, India	Hard	(Slovenia) Dalila Jakupović	6–2, 6–3

=== Doubles: 1 (title) ===
Result	Date	Tournament	Surface	Partner	Opponents	Score
Win	Nov 2017	Taipei Open, Taiwan	Carpet (i)	(Russia) Veronika Kudermetova	(Australia) Monique Adamczak (United Kingdom) Naomi Broady	2–6, 7–6^{(7–5)}, [10–6]

== ITF Circuit finals ==
Sabalenka debuted at the ITF Women's World Tennis Tour in 2012 at the $25k event in her hometown Minsk. In singles, she has been in eight finals and won five
of them, while in doubles, she has been in two finals and won one of them. Her biggest titles on the ITF Circuit were two $50k events in Tianjin and Toyota,
both achieved in 2016 in singles.

=== Singles: 8 (5 titles, 3 runner-ups) ===
Legend W50/60 tournaments (2–1) W25 tournaments (1–2) W10 tournaments (2–0)	Surface Hard (4–3) Carpet (1–0)

Result	W–L	Date	Tournament	Tier	Surface	Opponent	Score
Win	1–0	Sep 2015	ITF Antalya, Turkey	W10	Hard	(Romania) Daiana Negreanu	6–3, 7–5
Win	2–0	Oct 2015	ITF Antalya II, Turkey	W10	Hard	(Romania) Nicoleta Dascălu	6–4, 6–7^{(4)}, 7–5
Loss	2–1	Dec 2015	ITF Navi Mumbai, India	W25	Hard	(Austria) Barbara Haas	6–7^{(2)}, 6–7^{(6)}
Win	3–1	Dec 2015	ITF Pune, India	W25	Hard	(Russia) Viktoria Kamenskaya	6–3, 6–4
Loss	3–2	Feb 2016	ITF Perth, Australia	W25	Hard	(Australia) Arina Rodionova	1–6, 1–6
Win	4–2	May 2016	ITF Tianjin, China	W50	Hard	(Serbia) Nina Stojanović	5–7, 6–3, 6–1
Win	5–2	Nov 2016	Toyota World Challenge, Japan	W50	Carpet (i)	(Australia) Lizette Cabrera	6–2, 6–4
Loss	5–3	Mar 2017	Pingshan Open, China	W60	Hard	(Russia) Ekaterina Alexandrova	2–6, 5–7

=== Doubles: 2 (1 title, 1 runner-up) ===
Legend W10 tournaments (1–1)	Surface Hard (1–1)

Result	W–L	Date	Tournament	Tier	Surface	Partner	Opponents	Score
Loss	0–1	Apr 2015	ITF Heraklion, Greece	W10	Hard	(Serbia) Tamara Čurović	(India) Sharmada Balu (Chinese Taipei) Lee Pei-chi	6–4, 3–6, [2–10]
Win	1–1	Oct 2015	ITF Antalya, Turkey	W10	Hard	(Slovakia) Vivien Juhászová	(Turkey) Ayla Aksu (Bosnia and Herzegovina) Anita Husarić	6–1, 6–3

== Billie Jean King Cup participations ==
Legend	Meaning
WG F (1–2)	World Group final
WG SF (2–3)	World Group semifinal
WG QF (5–2)	Word Group quarterfinal
WG PO / F QR (3–3)	Word Group play-offs / Finals qualifying round

=== Singles: 16 (10–6) ===
Edition	Stage	Date	Location	Against	Surface	Opponent	W/L	Score
2017	WQ QF	Feb 2017	Minsk, Belarus	Netherlands	Hard (i)	Kiki Bertens	L	6–3, 6–7^{(6–8)}, 4–6
2017	WQ QF	Feb 2017	Minsk, Belarus	Netherlands	Hard (i)	Michaëlla Krajicek	W	7–6^{(7–5)}, 6–4
2017	WG SF	Apr 2017	Minsk, Belarus	Switzerland	Hard (i)	Timea Bacsinszky	L	4–6, 5–7
2017	WG SF	Apr 2017	Minsk, Belarus	Switzerland	Hard (i)	Viktorija Golubic	W	6–3, 2–6, 6–4
2017	WG F	Nov 2017	Minsk, Belarus	(United States) USA	Hard (i)	Sloane Stephens	W	6–3, 3–6, 6–4
2017	WG F	Nov 2017	Minsk, Belarus	(United States) USA	Hard (i)	CoCo Vandeweghe	L	6–7^{(5–7)}, 1–6
2018	WG QF	Feb 2018	Minsk, Belarus	Germany	Hard (i)	Tatjana Maria	W	4–6, 6–1, 6–2
2018	WG QF	Feb 2018	Minsk, Belarus	Germany	Hard (i)	Antonia Lottner	W	6–3, 5–7, 6–2
2018	WG PO	Apr 2018	Minsk, Belarus	Slovakia	Hard (i)	Viktória Kužmová	L	2–6, 6–2, 6–7^{(5–7)}
2018	WG PO	Apr 2018	Minsk, Belarus	Slovakia	Hard (i)	Anna Karolína Schmiedlová	W	6–3, 6–4
2019	WG QF	Feb 2019	Braunschweig, Germany	Germany	Hard (i)	Andrea Petkovic	W	6–2, 6–1
2019	WG QF	Feb 2019	Braunschweig, Germany	Germany	Hard (i)	Laura Siegemund	W	6–1, 6–1
2019	WG SF	Apr 2019	Brisbane, Australia	Australia	Hard	Samantha Stosur	W	7–5, 5–7, 6–3
2019	WG SF	Apr 2019	Brisbane, Australia	Australia	Hard	Ashleigh Barty	L	2–6, 2–6
2020–21	F QR	Feb 2020	The Hague, Netherlands	Netherlands	Clay (i)	Arantxa Rus	W	6–2, 6–3
2020–21	F QR	Feb 2020	The Hague, Netherlands	Netherlands	Clay (i)	Kiki Bertens	L	4–6, 4–6

=== Doubles: 5 (1–4) ===
Edition	Stage	Date	Location	Against	Surface	Partner	Opponents	W/L	Score
2016	WG PO	Apr 2016	Moscow, Russia	Russia	Clay (i)	Olga Govortsova	Daria Kasatkina; Elena Vesnina	L	4–6, 2–6
2017	WG F	Nov 2017	Minsk, Belarus	(United States) USA	Hard (i)	Aliaksandra Sasnovich	Shelby Rogers; CoCo Vandeweghe	L	3–6, 6–7^{(3–7)}
2018	WG QF	Feb 2018	Minsk, Belarus	Germany	Hard (i)	Lidziya Marozava	Anna-Lena Grönefeld; Tatjana Maria	L	7–6^{(7–4)}, 5–7, 4–6
2019	WG SF	Apr 2019	Brisbane, Australia	Australia	Hard	Victoria Azarenka	Ashleigh Barty; Samantha Stosur	L	5–7, 6–3, 2–6
2020–21	F QR	Feb 2020	The Hague, Netherlands	Netherlands	Clay (i)	Aliaksandra Sasnovich	Kiki Bertens; Demi Schuurs	W	4–6, 6–3, 7–6^{(10–8)}

== WTA Tour career earnings ==
Current after 2026 Miami Open.

Year	Titles			Earnings ($)	Rank
Year	Grand Slam	WTA	Total	Earnings ($)	Rank
2015	–	–	–	6,881	625
2016	–	–	–	33,839	299
2017	–	–	–	199,155	144
2018	–	2	2	1,867,872	23
2019	1	5	6	3,415,687	11
2020	–	4	4	1,239,684	9
2021	1	3	4	2,909,281	3
2022	–	–	–	2,461,320	8
2023	1	2	3	8,202,653	2
2024	2	2	4	9,729,260	1
2025	1	3	4	12,133,419	1
2026	–	3	3	8,036,563	1
Career	6	24	30	49,026,518	2

- Title counts include singles, doubles and mixed doubles titles.

== Career Grand Slam statistics ==
=== Best Grand Slam tournament results details ===
Grand Slam winners are in boldface, and runner–ups are in italics.

==== Singles ====
**Australian Open**
**2023 (5th)**
Round	Opponent	Rank	Score
1R	(Czech Republic) Tereza Martincová	74	6–1, 6–4
2R	(United States) Shelby Rogers	51	6–3, 6–1
3R	(Belgium) Elise Mertens (26)	32	6–2, 6–3
4R	(Switzerland) Belinda Bencic (12)	10	7–5, 6–2
QF	(Croatia) Donna Vekić	64	6–3, 6–2
SF	(Poland) Magda Linette	45	7–6^{(7–1)}, 6–2
**W**	(Kazakhstan) Elena Rybakina (22)	25	4–6, 6–3, 6–4
**2024 (2nd)**
Round	Opponent	Rank	Score
1R	(Germany) Ella Seidel (Q)	173	6–0, 6–1
2R	(Czech Republic) Brenda Fruhvirtová (Q)	107	6–3, 6–2
3R	(Ukraine) Lesia Tsurenko (28)	33	6–0, 6–0
4R	(United States) Amanda Anisimova (PR)	442	6–3, 6–2
QF	(Czech Republic) Barbora Krejčíková (9)	11	6–2, 6–3
SF	(United States) Coco Gauff (4)	4	7–6^{(7–2)}, 6–4
**W**	(China) Zheng Qinwen (12)	15	6–3, 6–2

**Wimbledon**
**2021 (2nd)**
Round	Opponent	Rank	Score
1R	(Romania) Monica Niculescu (Q)	191	6–1, 6–4
2R	(United Kingdom) Katie Boulter (WC)	219	4–6, 6–3, 6–3
3R	(Colombia) Camila Osorio (Q)	94	6–0, 6–3
4R	(Kazakhstan) Elena Rybakina (18)	20	6–3, 4–6, 6–3
QF	(Tunisia) Ons Jabeur (21)	24	6–4, 6–3
SF	(Czech Republic) Karolína Plíšková (8)	13	7–5, 4–6, 4–6
**2023 (2nd)**
Round	Opponent	Rank	Score
1R	(Hungary) Panna Udvardy	82	6–3, 6–1
2R	(France) Varvara Gracheva	41	2–6, 7–5, 6–2
3R	Anna Blinkova (Note: Russian and Belarus players are not allowed to compete under the name or flag of their country following the Russian invasion of Ukraine.)	40	6–2, 6–3
4R	Ekaterina Alexandrova (21)	22	6–4, 6–0
QF	(United States) Madison Keys (25)	18	6–2, 6–4
SF	(Tunisia) Ons Jabeur (6)	6	7–6^{(7–5)}, 4–6, 3–6
**2025 (1st)**
Round	Opponent	Rank	Score
1R	(Canada) Carson Branstine (Q)	194	6–1, 7–5
2R	(Czech Republic) Marie Bouzková	48	7–6^{(7–4)}, 6–4
3R	(United Kingdom) Emma Raducanu	40	7–6^{(8–6)}, 6–4
4R	(Belgium) Elise Mertens (24)	23	6–4, 7–6^{(7–4)}
QF	(Germany) Laura Siegemund	104	4–6, 6–2, 6–4
SF	(United States) Amanda Anisimova (13)	12	4–6, 6–4, 4–6

**French Open**
**2025 (1st)**
Round	Opponent	Rank	Score
1R	Kamilla Rakhimova	86	6–1, 6–0
2R	(Switzerland) Jil Teichmann	97	6–3, 6–1
3R	(Serbia) Olga Danilović	34	6–2, 6–3
4R	(United States) Amanda Anisimova (16)	16	7–5, 6–3
QF	(China) Zheng Qinwen (8)	7	7–6^{(7–3)}, 6–3
SF	(Poland) Iga Świątek (5)	5	7–6^{(7–1)}, 4–6, 6–0
F	**(United States) Coco Gauff (2)**	2	7–6^{(7–5)}, 2–6, 4–6

**US Open**
**2024 (2nd)**
Round	Opponent	Rank	Score
1R	(Australia) Priscilla Hon (Q)	203	6–3, 6–3
2R	(Italy) Lucia Bronzetti	76	6–3, 6–1
3R	Ekaterina Alexandrova (29)	31	2–6, 6–1, 6–2
4R	(Belgium) Elise Mertens (33)	35	6–2, 6–4
QF	(China) Zheng Qinwen (7)	7	6–1, 6–2
SF	(United States) Emma Navarro (13)	12	6–3, 7–6^{(7–2)}
**W**	(United States) Jessica Pegula (6)	6	7–5, 7–5
**2025 (1st)**
Round	Opponent	Rank	Score
1R	(Switzerland) Rebeka Masarova (Q)	108	7–5, 6–1
2R	Polina Kudermetova	67	7–6^{(7–2)}, 6–2
3R	(Canada) Leylah Fernandez (31)	30	6–3, 7–6^{(7–2)}
4R	(Spain) Cristina Bucșa	95	6–1, 6–4
QF	(Czech Republic) Markéta Vondroušová	60	w/o
SF	(United States) Jessica Pegula (4)	4	4–6, 6–3, 6–4
**W**	(United States) Amanda Anisimova (8)	9	6–3, 7–6^{(7–3)}

=== Grand Slam tournament seedings ===
The tournaments won by Sabalenka are in boldface, and advanced into finals by Sabalenka are in italics.

==== Singles ====
Legend seeded No. 1 (**1** / 7) seeded No. 2 (**2** / 9) seeded No. 3 (0 / 1) seeded No. 4–10 (**1** / 8) seeded No. 11–32 (0 / 4) unseeded (0 / 3)	Longest streak 7 5 1 3 3 3

Year	Australian Open	French Open	Wimbledon	US Open
2016	A	A	A	DNQ
2017	DNQ	DNQ	Q	DNQ
2018	–	–	–	26th
2019	11th	11th	10th	9th
2020	11th	8th	cancelled	5th
2021	7th	3rd	2nd	2nd
2022	2nd	7th	A	6th
2023	**5th (1)**	2nd	2nd	2nd (1)
2024	**2nd (2)**	2nd	~~3rd~~	**2nd (3)**
2025	1st (2)	1st (3)	1st	**1st (4)**
2026	1st (4)	1st	1st	

- Key: (A) absent; (Q) qualifier; (DNQ) did not qualify; (RT) retired; (NH) Not Held; (–) unseeded; (LL) lucky looser; (PR) protect ranking.

==== Doubles ====
Legend seeded No. 2 (**1** / 2) seeded No. 3 (0 / 2) seeded No. 4–10 (**1** / 3) unseeded (0 / 4)	Longest streak 1 (Note: 2020 US Open was played before the 2020 French Open due to schedule change caused by COVID-19 outbreak) 1 3 3

Year	Australian Open	French Open	Wimbledon	US Open
2018	–	A	–	–
2019	–	6th	6th	**4th (1)**
2020	3rd	3rd	cancelled	2nd
2021	**2nd (2)**	A	A	A
2022	A	A		A

- Key: (A) absent; (Q) qualifier; (DNQ) did not qualify; (RT) retired; (NH) Not Held; (–) unseeded; (LL) lucky looser; (PR) protect ranking.

== Wins against top 10 players ==
- Sabalenka has a 63–43 record against players who were, at the time the match was played, ranked in the top 10.

Season	2018	2019	2020	2021	2022	2023	2024	2025	2026	Total
Wins	7	3	1	4	5	8	11	15	8	63

No.	Opponent	Rk	Event	Surface	Rd	Score	Rk	Years	Ref
1.	(Czech Republic) Karolína Plíšková	7	Eastbourne International, UK	Grass	QF	6–3, 2–6, 7–6^{(7–5)}	45	2018	
2.	(Denmark) Caroline Wozniacki	2	Canadian Open, Canada	Hard	2R	5–7, 6–2, 7–6^{(7–4)}	39	2018	
3.	(Czech Republic) Karolína Plíšková	8	Cincinnati Open, United States	Hard	2R	2–6, 6–3, 7–5	34	2018	
4.	(France) Caroline Garcia	5	Cincinnati Open, United States	Hard	3R	6–4, 3–6, 7–5	34	2018	
5.	(Germany) Julia Görges	9	Connecticut Open, United States	Hard	SF	6–4, 7–6^{(7–3)}	25	2018	
6.	(Czech Republic) Petra Kvitová	5	US Open, United States	Hard	3R	7–5, 6–1	20	2018	
7.	(Ukraine) Elina Svitolina	6	Wuhan Open, China	Hard	2R	6–4, 2–6, 6–1	20	2018	
8.	(France) Caroline Garcia	8	China Open, China	Hard	3R	5–7, 7–6^{(7–3)}, 6–0	16	2018	
9.	(Netherlands) Kiki Bertens	8	Wuhan Open, China	Hard	3R	6–1, 7–6^{(11–9)}	14	2019	
10.	(Australia) Ashleigh Barty	1	Wuhan Open, China	Hard	SF	7–5, 6–4	14	2019	
11.	(Netherlands) Kiki Bertens	10	WTA Elite Trophy, China	Hard	F	6–4, 6–2	14	2019	
12.	(Romania) Simona Halep	4	Adelaide International, Australia	Hard	QF	6–4, 6–2	12	2020	
13.	(Romania) Simona Halep	3	Stuttgart Open, Germany	Clay (i)	SF	6–3, 6–2	7	2021	
14.	(Australia) Ashleigh Barty	1	Madrid Open, Spain	Clay	F	6–0, 3–6, 6–4	7	2021	
15.	(Czech Republic) Barbora Krejčíková	9	US Open, United States	Hard	QF	6–1, 6–4	2	2021	
16.	(Poland) Iga Świątek	9	WTA Finals, Mexico	Hard	RR	2–6, 6–2, 7–5	2	2021	
17.	(Estonia) Anett Kontaveit	6	Stuttgart Open, Germany	Clay (i)	QF	6–4, 3–6, 6–1	4	2022	
18.	(Spain) Paula Badosa	3	Stuttgart Open, Germany	Clay (i)	SF	7–6^{(7–5)}, 6–4	4	2022	
19.	(Tunisia) Ons Jabeur	2	WTA Finals, United States	Hard (i)	RR	3–6, 7–6^{(7–5)}, 7–5	7	2022	
20.	(United States) Jessica Pegula	3	WTA Finals, United States	Hard (i)	RR	6–3, 7–5	7	2022	
21.	(Poland) Iga Świątek	1	WTA Finals, United States	Hard (i)	SF	6–2, 2–6, 6–1	7	2022	
22.	(Switzerland) Belinda Bencic	10	Australian Open, Australia	Hard	4R	7–5, 6–2	5	2023	
23.	(United States) Coco Gauff	6	Indian Wells Open, United States	Hard	QF	6–4, 6–0	2	2023	
24.	(Greece) Maria Sakkari	7	Indian Wells Open, United States	Hard	SF	6–2, 6–3	2	2023	
25.	(Greece) Maria Sakkari	9	Madrid Open, Spain	Clay	SF	6–4, 6–1	2	2023	
26.	(Poland) Iga Świątek	1	Madrid Open, Spain	Clay	F	6–3, 3–6, 6–3	2	2023	
27.	(Tunisia) Ons Jabeur	5	Cincinnati Open, United States	Hard	QF	7–5, 6–3	2	2023	
28.	(Greece) Maria Sakkari	9	WTA Finals, Mexico	Hard	RR	6–0, 6–1	1	2023	
29.	(Kazakhstan) Elena Rybakina	4	WTA Finals, Mexico	Hard	RR	6–2, 3–6, 6–3	1	2023	
30.	(United States) Coco Gauff	4	Australian Open, Australia	Hard	SF	7–6^{(7–2)}, 6–4	2	2024	
31.	(Kazakhstan) Elena Rybakina	4	Madrid Open, Spain	Clay	SF	1–6, 7–5, 7–6^{(7–5)}	2	2024	
32.	(Latvia) Jeļena Ostapenko	10	Italian Open, Italy	Clay	QF	6–2, 6–4	2	2024	
33.	(Poland) Iga Świątek	1	Cincinnati Open, United States	Hard	SF	6–3, 6–3	3	2024	
34.	(United States) Jessica Pegula	6	Cincinnati Open, United States	Hard	F	6–3, 7–5	3	2024	
35.	(China) Zheng Qinwen	7	US Open, United States	Hard	QF	6–1, 6–2	2	2024	
36.	(United States) Jessica Pegula	6	US Open, United States	Hard	F	7–5, 7–5	2	2024	
37.	(United States) Coco Gauff	4	Wuhan Open, China	Hard	SF	1–6, 6–4, 6–4	2	2024	
38.	(China) Zheng Qinwen	7	Wuhan Open, China	Hard	F	6–3, 5–7, 6–3	2	2024	
39.	(China) Zheng Qinwen	7	WTA Finals, Saudi Arabia	Hard (i)	RR	6–3, 6–4	1	2024	
40.	(Italy) Jasmine Paolini	4	WTA Finals, Saudi Arabia	Hard (i)	RR	6–3, 7–5	1	2024	
41.	(United States) Madison Keys	5	Indian Wells Open, United States	Hard	SF	6–0, 6–1	1	2025	
42.	(China) Zheng Qinwen	9	Miami Open, United States	Hard	QF	6–2, 7–5	1	2025	
43.	(Italy) Jasmine Paolini	7	Miami Open, United States	Hard	SF	6–2, 6–2	1	2025	
44.	(United States) Jessica Pegula	4	Miami Open, United States	Hard	F	7–5, 6–2	1	2025	
45.	(Italy) Jasmine Paolini	6	Stuttgart Open, Germany	Clay (i)	SF	7–5, 6–4	1	2025	
46.	(United States) Coco Gauff	4	Madrid Open, Spain	Clay	F	6–3, 7–6^{(7–3)}	1	2025	
47.	(China) Zheng Qinwen	7	French Open, France	Clay	QF	7–6^{(7–3)}, 6–3	1	2025	
48.	(Poland) Iga Świątek	5	French Open, France	Clay	SF	7–6^{(7–1)}, 4–6, 6–0	1	2025	
49.	(United States) Jessica Pegula	4	US Open, United States	Hard	SF	4–6, 6–3, 6–4	1	2025	
50.	(United States) Amanda Anisimova	9	US Open, United States	Hard	F	6–3, 7–6^{(7–3)}	1	2025	
51.	(Kazakhstan) Elena Rybakina	9	Wuhan Open, China	Hard	QF	6–3, 6–3	1	2025	
52.	(Italy) Jasmine Paolini	8	WTA Finals, Saudi Arabia	Hard (i)	RR	6–3, 6–1	1	2025	
53.	(United States) Jessica Pegula	5	WTA Finals, Saudi Arabia	Hard (i)	RR	6–4, 2–6, 6–2	1	2025	
54.	(United States) Coco Gauff	3	WTA Finals, Saudi Arabia	Hard (i)	RR	7–6^{(7–5)}, 6–2	1	2025	
55.	(United States) Amanda Anisimova	4	WTA Finals, Saudi Arabia	Hard (i)	SF	6–3, 3–6, 6–3	1	2025	
56.	(United States) Madison Keys	8	Brisbane International, Australia	Hard	QF	6–3, 6–3	1	2026	
57.	(Canada) Victoria Mboko	10	Indian Wells Open, United States	Hard	QF	7–6^{(7–0)}, 6–4	1	2026	
58.	(Kazakhstan) Elena Rybakina	3	Indian Wells Open, United States	Hard	F	3–6, 6–3, 7–6^{(8–6)}	1	2026	
59.	(Kazakhstan) Elena Rybakina	2	Miami Open, United States	Hard	SF	6–4, 6–3	1	2026	
60.	(United States) Coco Gauff	4	Miami Open, United States	Hard	F	6–2, 4–6, 6–3	1	2026	
61.	(Czech Republic) Linda Nosková	6	US Open, United States	Hard	QF	7–6^{(7–1)}, 3–6, 7–6^{(10–7)}	1	2026	
62.	(United States) Jessica Pegula	3	US Open, United States	Hard	SF	7–5, 6–2	1	2026	
63.	(Czech Republic) Karolína Muchová	7	WTA Finals, United States	Hard	RR	7–6^{(7–2)}, 7–5	2	2026	

- Key: (Rk) first use, opponent rank; (Rd) round; (Rk) 2nd use, player rank; (Ref) reference; (F) final; (SF) semifinal; (QF) quarterfinal; (#R) rounds 4, 3, 2, 1; (RR) round-robin stage; (Q#) qualifying rounds or stages (3), 2, 1.

== Double-bagel matches ==
Result	W–L	Year	Tournament	Tier	Surface	Opponent	vsRank	Round
Win	1–0	2015	ITF Heraklion, Greece	10K	Hard	(Serbia) Sofija Sabljarević	N/A	FQR
Win	2–0	2015	ITF Anatalya, Turkey	10K	Hard	(Turkey) Nur Gulsan Birçen	N/A	1R
Win	3–0	2024	Australian Open, Australia	Grand Slam	Hard	(Ukraine) Lesia Tsurenko	33	3R

== Longest winning streaks ==
=== 15-match win streak (2020–21) ===
#	Tournament	Tier	Start date	Surface	Rd	Opponent	Rk	Score
–	French Open	Grand Slam	27 September 2020	Clay	3R	(Tunisia) Ons Jabeur (30)	35	6–7^{(7–9)}, 6–2, 3–6
1	Ostrava Open	Premier	19 October 2020	Hard (i)	2R	(United States) Coco Gauff (Q)	55	1–6, 7–5, 7–6^{(7–2)}
2	Ostrava Open	Premier	19 October 2020	Hard (i)	QF	(Spain) Sara Sorribes Tormo (Q)	73	0–6, 6–4, 6–0
3	Ostrava Open	Premier	19 October 2020	Hard (i)	SF	(United States) Jennifer Brady	26	6–4, 6–4
4	Ostrava Open	Premier	19 October 2020	Hard (i)	W	(Belarus) Victoria Azarenka (4)	14	6–2, 6–2
5	Linz Open	International	9 November 2020	Hard (i)	1R	(Italy) Jasmine Paolini	94	6–4, 6–4
6	Linz Open	International	9 November 2020	Hard (i)	2R	(Switzerland) Stefanie Vögele (Q)	124	6–0, 6–3
7	Linz Open	International	9 November 2020	Hard (i)	QF	(France) Océane Dodin (Q)	115	6–3, 3–3 ret.
8	Linz Open	International	9 November 2020	Hard (i)	SF	(Czech Republic) Barbora Krejčíková	74	7–5, 4–6, 6–3
9	Linz Open	International	9 November 2020	Hard (i)	W	(Belgium) Elise Mertens (2)	21	7–5, 6–2
10	Abu Dhabi Open	WTA 500	6 January 2021	Hard	1R	(Slovenia) Polona Hercog	49	7–6^{(7–5)}, 6–2
11	Abu Dhabi Open	WTA 500	6 January 2021	Hard	2R	(Australia) Ajla Tomljanović	68	7–5, 6–4
12	Abu Dhabi Open	WTA 500	6 January 2021	Hard	3R	(Tunisia) Ons Jabeur (15)	31	6–2, 6–4
13	Abu Dhabi Open	WTA 500	6 January 2021	Hard	QF	(Kazakhstan) Elena Rybakina (6)	19	6–4, 4–6, 6–3
14	Abu Dhabi Open	WTA 500	6 January 2021	Hard	SF	(Greece) Maria Sakkari (9)	22	6–3, 6–2
15	Abu Dhabi Open	WTA 500	6 January 2021	Hard	W	(Russia) Veronika Kudermetova	46	6–2, 6–2
–	Gippsland Trophy	WTA 500	31 January 2021	Hard	2R	(Estonia) Kaia Kanepi	94	1–6, 6–2, 1–6

=== 15-match win streak (2024) ===
#	Tournament	Tier	Start date	Surface	Rd	Opponent	Rk	Score
–	Canadian Open	WTA 1000	6 August 2024	Hard	QF	(United States) Amanda Anisimova (PR)	132	4–6, 2–6
–	Cincinnati Open	WTA 1000	13 August 2024	Hard	1R	Bye		
1	Cincinnati Open	WTA 1000	13 August 2024	Hard	2R	(Italy) Elisabetta Cocciaretto	66	6–3, 6–4
2	Cincinnati Open	WTA 1000	13 August 2024	Hard	3R	(Ukraine) Elina Svitolina	30	7–5, 6–2
3	Cincinnati Open	WTA 1000	13 August 2024	Hard	QF	Liudmila Samsonova (10)	17	6–3, 6–2
4	Cincinnati Open	WTA 1000	13 August 2024	Hard	SF	(Poland) Iga Świątek (1)	1	6–3, 6–3
5	Cincinnati Open	WTA 1000	13 August 2024	Hard	W	(United States) Jessica Pegula (6)	6	6–3, 7–5
6	US Open	Grand Slam	26 August 2024	Hard	1R	(Australia) Priscilla Hon (Q)	205	6–3, 6–3
7	US Open	Grand Slam	26 August 2024	Hard	2R	(Italy) Lucia Bronzetti	76	6–3, 6–1
8	US Open	Grand Slam	26 August 2024	Hard	3R	Ekaterina Alexandrova (29)	31	2–6, 6–1, 6–2
9	US Open	Grand Slam	26 August 2024	Hard	4R	(Belgium) Elise Mertens (33)	35	6–2, 6–4
10	US Open	Grand Slam	26 August 2024	Hard	QF	(China) Zheng Qinwen (7)	7	6–1, 6–2
11	US Open	Grand Slam	26 August 2024	Hard	SF	(United States) Emma Navarro (13)	12	6–3, 7–6^{(7–2)}
12	US Open	Grand Slam	26 August 2024	Hard	W	(United States) Jessica Pegula (6)	6	7–5, 7–5
–	China Open	WTA 1000	25 September 2024	Hard	1R	Bye		
13	China Open	WTA 1000	25 September 2024	Hard	2R	(Thailand) Mananchaya Sawangkaew (Q)	187	6–4, 6–1
14	China Open	WTA 1000	25 September 2024	Hard	3R	(United States) Ashlyn Krueger	68	6–2, 6–2
15	China Open	WTA 1000	25 September 2024	Hard	4R	(United States) Madison Keys (18)	24	6–4, 6–3
–	China Open	WTA 1000	25 September 2024	Hard	QF	(Czech Republic) Karolína Muchová	49	6–7^{(5–7)}, 6–2, 4–6

=== 15-match win streak (2026) ===
#	Tournament	Tier	Start date	Surface	Rd	Opponent	Rk	Score
–	Australian Open	Grand Slam	18 January 2026	Hard	F	(Kazakhstan) Elena Rybakina (5)	5	4–6, 6–4, 4–6
–	Indian Wells Open	WTA 1000	4 March 2026	Hard	1R	Bye		
1	Indian Wells Open	WTA 1000	4 March 2026	Hard	2R	(Japan) Himeno Sakatsume (Q)	136	6–4, 6–2
2	Indian Wells Open	WTA 1000	4 March 2026	Hard	3R	(Romania) Jaqueline Cristian	35	6–4, 6–1
3	Indian Wells Open	WTA 1000	4 March 2026	Hard	4R	(Japan) Naomi Osaka (16)	16	6–2, 6–4
4	Indian Wells Open	WTA 1000	4 March 2026	Hard	QF	(Canada) Victoria Mboko (10)	10	7–6^{(7–0)}, 6–4
5	Indian Wells Open	WTA 1000	4 March 2026	Hard	SF	(Czech Republic) Linda Nosková (14)	14	6–3, 6–4
6	Indian Wells Open	WTA 1000	4 March 2026	Hard	W	(Kazakhstan) Elena Rybakina (3)	3	3–6, 6–3, 7–6^{(8–6)}
–	Miami Open	WTA 1000	17 March 2026	Hard	1R	Bye		
7	Miami Open	WTA 1000	17 March 2026	Hard	2R	(United States) Ann Li	39	7–6^{(7–5)}, 6–4
8	Miami Open	WTA 1000	17 March 2026	Hard	3R	(United States) Caty McNally	72	6–4, 6–2
9	Miami Open	WTA 1000	17 March 2026	Hard	4R	(China) Zheng Qinwen (23)	26	6–3, 6–4
10	Miami Open	WTA 1000	17 March 2026	Hard	QF	(United States) Hailey Baptiste	45	6–4, 6–4
11	Miami Open	WTA 1000	17 March 2026	Hard	SF	(Kazakhstan) Elena Rybakina (3)	2	6–4, 6–3
12	Miami Open	WTA 1000	17 March 2026	Hard	W	(United States) Coco Gauff (4)	4	6–2, 4–6, 6–3
–	Madrid Open	WTA 1000	21 April 2026	Clay	1R	Bye		
13	Madrid Open	WTA 1000	21 April 2026	Clay	2R	(United States) Peyton Stearns	43	7–5, 6–3
14	Madrid Open	WTA 1000	21 April 2026	Clay	3R	(Romania) Jaqueline Cristian (29)	33	6–1, 6–4
15	Madrid Open	WTA 1000	21 April 2026	Clay	4R	(Japan) Naomi Osaka (14)	15	6–7^{(1–7)}, 6–3, 6–2
–	Madrid Open	WTA 1000	21 April 2026	Clay	QF	(United States) Hailey Baptiste	32	6–2, 2–6, 6–7^{(6–8)}

- Key: (Rk) opponent rank; (Rd) round; (F) final; (SF) semifinal; (QF) quarterfinal; (#R) rounds 4, 3, 2, 1; (RR) round-robin stage

== Exhibition matches ==
=== Singles ===
Result	Date	Tournament	Surface	Opponent	Score
Win	Mar 2025	MGM Rewards Slam, Las Vegas, United States	Hard (i)	(Japan) Naomi Osaka	6–4, 6–4
Win	Dec 2025	The Atlanta Cup, Atlanta, United States	Hard (i)	(Japan) Naomi Osaka	6–3, 4–6, [10–4]
Win	Dec 2025	The Garden Cup, New York, United States	Hard (i)	(Japan) Naomi Osaka	6–4, 7–5
Loss	Dec 2025	Battle of the Sexes, Dubai, UAE	Hard (i)	(Australia) Nick Kyrgios	3–6, 3–6

=== Mixed doubles ===
Result	Date	Tournament	Surface	Partner	Opponents	Score
Win	Mar 2025	MGM Rewards Slam, Las Vegas, United States	Hard (i)	(United States) Andre Agassi	(Japan) Naomi Osaka (United States) Mardy Fish	10–8

=== Team competitions ===
Result	Date	Tournament	Surface	Team	Partner(s)	Opp. team	Opponent players	Score
Loss	Dec 2023	World Tennis League, Abu Dhabi, UAE	Hard	SG Mavericks Kites	Grigor Dimitrov; Stefanos Tsitsipas; Paula Badosa	PBG Eagle	Andrey Rublev; Daniil Medvedev; Sofia Kenin; Mirra Andreeva	26–29
Loss	Dec 2024	World Tennis League, Abu Dhabi, UAE	Hard	TSL Hawks	Jordan Thompson; Sumit Nagal; Mirra Andreeva	Falcons Game Changer	Andrey Rublev; Denis Shapovalov; Caroline Garcia; Elena Rybakina	16–20
