= 2022 World Tennis League =

- Date: 19–24 December 2022
- Edition: 1st
- Draw: 4 teams
- Surface: Hard
- Location: Dubai, United Arab Emirates
- Venue: Coca-Cola Arena

Champions
- Hawks (Zverev, Rybakina, Thiem, Pavlyuchenkova)
- World Tennis League

The 2022 World Tennis League was a non-ATP/WTA-affiliated exhibition mixed-gender team tennis tournament. It was the inaugural edition of the World Tennis League. The event was held on hard court at the Coca-Cola Arena in Dubai, United Arab Emirates from 19 until 24 December 2022.

Team Hawks, composed of Alexander Zverev, Elena Rybakina, Dominic Thiem and Anastasia Pavlyuchenkova, won the title, after defeating Team Kites (Félix Auger-Aliassime, Iga Świątek, Holger Rune and Sania Mirza) in the final, 32-25.

== Format ==
18 players were drawn into four teams (Falcons, Eagles, Kites, Hawks). The teams played each other in a round-robin format that consist of one men’s singles match, one women’s singles match and a mixed doubles match. They got one point for each game they win in a tie, plus one bonus point for a win in a third-set match tiebreak and five bonus points for winning the tie. Following the round-robin phase, the top two teams faced off in the final on 24 December 2022.

== Teams and players ==
	Falcons		Eagles		Kites		Hawks	
	Player	Rank	Player	Rank	Player	Rank	Player	Rank
Men #1	(Serbia) Novak Djokovic	5	(Australia) Nick Kyrgios	22	(Canada) Félix Auger-Aliassime	6	(Germany) Alexander Zverev	12
Women #1	(Belarus) Aryna Sabalenka	5	(France) Caroline Garcia	4	(Poland) Iga Świątek	1	(Kazakhstan) Elena Rybakina	21
Men #2	(Bulgaria) Grigor Dimitrov	28	(Italy) Andreas Seppi	354	(Denmark) Holger Rune	11	(Austria) Dominic Thiem	102
Women #2	(Spain) Paula Badosa	13	(Canada) Bianca Andreescu	46	(India) Sania Mirza	–	(Russia) Anastasia Pavlyuchenkova	368
Men #3			(India) Rohan Bopanna	–	(Austria) Sebastian Ofner (Alt)	193		
Women #3					(Canada) Eugenie Bouchard	327		

- Singles rankings as of 19 December 2022.

== Results ==
19 December 2022: Kites def. Eagles 35–27
Event	Kites	Eagles	Score	Games	Bonus	Total
Mixed doubles	(Canada) E Bouchard / (Denmark) H Rune	(Canada) B Andreescu / (Australia) N Kyrgios	2–6, 3–6	5–12	–	5–12
Women's singles	(Poland) Iga Świątek	(France) Caroline Garcia	6–3, 6–4	12–7	–	17–19
Men's singles	(Canada) Félix Auger-Aliassime	(Australia) Nick Kyrgios	7–5, 6–3	13–8	–	30–27
Tie winning bonus					5–0	35–27

20 December 2022: Hawks def. Falcons 35–27
Event	Hawks	Falcons	Score	Games	Bonus	Total
Mixed doubles	(Russia) A Pavlyuchenkova / (Austria) D Thiem	(Spain) P Badosa / (Bulgaria) G Dimitrov	7–5, 3–6, [4–10]	10–12	0–1	10–13
Women's singles	(Kazakhstan) Elena Rybakina	(Belarus) Aryna Sabalenka	0–6, 6–1, [10–6]	7–7	1–0	18–20
Men's singles	(Germany) Alexander Zverev	(Serbia) Novak Djokovic	6–3, 6–4	12–7	–	30–27
Tie winning bonus					5–0	35–27

21 December 2022: Eagles def. Falcons 38–31
Event	Eagles	Falcons	Score	Games	Bonus	Total
Mixed doubles	(Canada) B Andreescu / (India) R Bopanna	(Belarus) A Sabalenka / (Bulgaria) G Dimitrov	6–2, 6–7^{(4–7)}, [7–10]	12–10	0–1	12–11
Women's singles	(France) Caroline Garcia	(Spain) Paula Badosa	6–4, 6–3	12–7	–	24–18
Men's singles	(Australia) Nick Kyrgios	(Bulgaria) Grigor Dimitrov	6–7^{(5–7)}, 3–6	9–13	–	33–31
Tie winning bonus					5–0	38–31

22 December 2022: Kites def. Hawks 42–31
Event	Kites	Hawks	Score	Games	Bonus	Total
Mixed doubles	(India) S Mirza / (Canada) F Auger-Aliassime	(Kazakhstan) E Rybakina / (Germany) A Zverev	5–7, 6–3, [5–10]	11–11	0–1	11–12
Women's singles	(Poland) Iga Świątek	(Russia) Anastasia Pavlyuchenkova	6–4, 6–3	12–7	–	23–19
Men's singles	(Canada) Félix Auger-Aliassime	(Austria) Dominic Thiem	7–6^{(7–2)}, 7–6^{(7–6)}	14–12	–	37–31
Tie winning bonus					5–0	42–31

23 December 2022: Hawks def. Eagles 40–24
Event	Hawks	Eagles	Score	Games	Bonus	Total
Mixed doubles	(Russia) A Pavlyuchenkova / (Austria) D Thiem	(Canada) B Andreescu / (Australia) N Kyrgios	4–6, 6–4, [7–10]	10–11	0–1	10–12
Women's singles	(Kazakhstan) Elena Rybakina	(France) Caroline Garcia	7–5, 6–1	13–6	–	23–18
Men's singles	(Germany) Alexander Zverev	(Italy) Andreas Seppi	6–4, 6–2	12–6	–	35–24
Tie winning bonus					5–0	40–24

23 December 2022: Kites def. Falcons 36–26
Event	Kites	Falcons	Score	Games	Bonus	Total
Mixed doubles	(India) S Mirza / (Denmark) H Rune	(Spain) P Badosa / (Bulgaria) G Dimitrov	6–2, 4–6, [10–5]	11–8	1–0	12–8
Women's singles	(Poland) Iga Świątek	(Belarus) Aryna Sabalenka	6–1, 6–3	12–4	–	24–12
Men's singles	(Austria) Sebastian Ofner	(Serbia) Novak Djokovic	7–6^{(7–5)}, 0–6, [7–10]	7–13	0–1	31–26
Tie winning bonus					5–0	36–26

== Standings ==
A team received 5 bonus points for each tie won and 1 bonus point for each third-set match tiebreak won. The top two teams qualified for the final.

Rank	Team	Ties win–loss	Games won	Bonus points	Points total
1	Kites	3–0	97	16	113
2	Hawks	2–1	94	12	106
3	Eagles	1–2	83	6	89
4	Falcons	0–3	81	3	84

== Final ==
24 December 2022: Hawks def. Kites 32–25
Event	Hawks	Kites	Score	Games	Bonus	Total
Women's singles	(Kazakhstan) Elena Rybakina	(Poland) Iga Świątek	6–3, 6–1	12–4	–	12–4
Men's singles	(Germany) Alexander Zverev	(Canada) Félix Auger-Aliassime	4–6, 3–6	7–12	–	19–16
Mixed doubles	(Russia) A Pavlyuchenkova / (Austria) D Thiem	(India) S Mirza / (Denmark) H Rune	7–6^{(7–4)}, 6–3	13–9	–	32–25
