= 2025 World Tennis League =

- Date: 17–20 December 2025
- Edition: 4th
- Draw: 4 teams
- Surface: Hard
- Location: Bengaluru, India
- Venue: SM Krishna Tennis Stadium

Champions
- Kites (Kyrgios, Kostyuk, Suresh, Raina)
- World Tennis League

The 2025 World Tennis League was a non-ATP/WTA-affiliated exhibition mixed-gender team tennis tournament. It was the fourth edition of the World Tennis League. The event was held for the first time in India, at the SM Krishna Tennis Stadium in Bengaluru on hard court from 17 until 20 December 2025.

Team Kites, composed of Nick Kyrgios, Marta Kostyuk, Dhakshineswar Suresh and Ankita Raina, won the title, defeating Team Eagles (Gaël Monfils, Paula Badosa, Sumit Nagal and Shrivalli Bhamidipaty) in the final, 22–19.

== Format ==
The teams play each other in a round-robin format. Each ties consistes of four sets: one men's singles, one women's singles, and two doubles sets, which may include men's doubles, women's doubles, or mixed doubles, as determined by the team that wins the coin toss. They get one point for each game they win in a tie. If the team that wins the fourth set is leading the tie, the tie will be over. If the team that win the fourth set will be trailing in the match, the match goes to overtime. If the leading team win one game in overtime, it win the match tie. If the overall game score becomes equal, a first to 10 'super shoot-out tiebreak will be played, which will be worth one game point plus two bonus points.

Following the round-robin phase, the top two teams faced off in the final on 20 December 2025.

== Teams and players ==
16 players were drawn into four teams (Eagles, Falcons, Hawks, Kites).

	Men #1	Rank	Women #1	Rank	Men #2	Women #2
Eagles	(France) Gaël Monfils	68	(Spain) Paula Badosa	25	(India) Sumit Nagal	(India) Shrivalli Bhamidipaty
Falcons	(Russia) Daniil Medvedev	13	(Poland) Magda Linette	55	(India) Rohan Bopanna	(India) Sahaja Yamalapalli
Hawks	(Canada) Denis Shapovalov	23	(Ukraine) Elina Svitolina	14	(India) Yuki Bhambri	(India) Maaya Rajeshwaran
Kites	(Australia) Nick Kyrgios	673	(Ukraine) Marta Kostyuk	26	(India) Dhakshineswar Suresh	(India) Ankita Raina

- Singles rankings as of 15 December 2025.

== Results ==
17 December 2025: Hawks def. Kites 25–21
Event	Hawks	Kites	Score	Total
Women's doubles	(India) M Rajeshwaran / (Ukraine) E Svitolina	(Ukraine) M Kostyuk / (India) A Raina	7–5	7–5
Women's singles	(Ukraine) Elina Svitolina	(Ukraine) Marta Kostyuk	7–5	14–10
Men's doubles	(India) Y Bhambri / (Canada) D Shapovalov	(Australia) N Kyrgios / (India) D Suresh	4–6	18–16
Men's singles	(Canada) Denis Shapovalov	(India) Dhakshineswar Suresh	7–5	25–21

17 December 2025: Eagles def. Falcons 18–16
Event	Eagles	Falcons	Score	Total
Women's singles	(Spain) Paula Badosa	(Poland) Magda Linette	4–6	4–6
Mixed doubles	(Spain) P Badosa / (India) S Nagal	(Poland) M Linette / (India) R Bopanna	6–1	10–7
Men's doubles	(France) G Monfils / (India) S Nagal	(India) R Bopanna / (Russia) D Medvedev	2–6	12–13
Men's singles	(France) Gaël Monfils	(Russia) Daniil Medvedev	6–3	18–16

18 December 2025: Eagles def. Kites 25–13
Event	Eagles	Kites	Score	Total
Women's singles	(Spain) Paula Badosa	(Ukraine) Marta Kostyuk	6–1	6–1
Mixed doubles	(Spain) P Badosa / (France) G Monfils	(Ukraine) M Kostyuk / (India) D Suresh	6–3	12–4
Men's doubles	(France) G Monfils / (India) S Nagal	(Australia) N Kyrgios / (India) D Suresh	6–3	18–7
Men's singles	(India) Sumit Nagal	(India) Dhakshineswar Suresh	7–6	25–13

18 December 2025: Falcons def. Hawks 20–16
Event	Falcons	Hawks	Score	Total
Women's singles	(Poland) Magda Linette	(Ukraine) Elina Svitolina	2–6	2–6
Mixed doubles	(Poland) M Linette / (India) R Bopanna	(India) M Rajeshwaran / (India) Y Bhambri	6–3	8–9
Men's doubles	(India) R Bopanna / (Russia) D Medvedev	(India) Y Bhambri / (Canada) D Shapovalov	6–3	14–12
Men's singles	(Russia) Daniil Medvedev	(Canada) Denis Shapovalov	6–4	20–16

19 December 2025: Eagles def. Hawks 22–12
Event	Eagles	Hawks	Score	Total
Mixed doubles	(India) S Bhamidipaty / (France) G Monfils	(Ukraine) E Svitolina / (India) Y Bhambri	4–6	4–6
Men's singles	(India) Sumit Nagal	(Canada) Denis Shapovalov	6–1	10–7
Women's singles	(India) Shrivalli Bhamidipaty	(India) Maaya Rajeshwaran	6–2	16–9
Women's doubles	(Spain) P Badosa / (India) S Bhamidipaty	(India) M Rajeshwaran / (Ukraine) E Svitolina	6–3	22–12

19 December 2025: Kites def. Falcons 24–19
Event	Kites	Falcons	Score	Total
Women's singles	(Ukraine) Marta Kostyuk	(Poland) Magda Linette	6–4	6–4
Mixed doubles	(Ukraine) M Kostyuk / (India) D Suresh	(India) S Yamalapalli / (India) R Bopanna	6–4	12–8
Men's doubles	(Australia) N Kyrgios / (India) D Suresh	(India) R Bopanna / (Russia) D Medvedev	6–7	18–15
Men's singles	(India) Dhakshineswar Suresh	(Russia) Daniil Medvedev	6–4	24–19

== Standings ==
A team received 2 bonus points for each super shoot-out tiebreak won. The top two teams qualified for the final.

Rank	Team	Ties	Games	Bonus points	Points total
1	Eagles	3–0	65–41	0	65
2	Kites	1–2	58–69	0	58
3	Falcons	1–2	55–58	0	55
4	Hawks	1–2	53–63	0	53

== Final ==
20 December 2025: Kites def. Eagles 22–19
Event	Kites	Eagles	Score	Total
Women's singles	(Ukraine) Marta Kostyuk	(India) Shrivalli Bhamidipaty	6–4	6–4
Mixed doubles	(Ukraine) M Kostyuk / (India) D Suresh	(India) S Bhamidipaty / (France) G Monfils	3–6	9–10
Men's doubles	(Australia) N Kyrgios / (India) D Suresh	(France) G Monfils / (India) S Nagal	6–3	15–13
Men's singles	(India) Dhakshineswar Suresh	(India) Sumit Nagal	7–6	22–19
