= 2016 Trophée des Alpilles – Singles =

Singles
- 2016 Trophée des Alpilles

Final
- Champion: (Russia) Daniil Medvedev
- Runner-up: (Belgium) Joris De Loore
- Score: 6–3, 6–3

Events
Singles	Doubles
← 2015 ·	Trophée des Alpilles	· 2017 →

Ivan Dodig was the defending champion but chose not to defend his title.

Daniil Medvedev won the title after defeating Joris De Loore 6–3, 6–3 in the final.

== Seeds ==
1. (Ukraine) Sergiy Stakhovsky (first round)
2. (Russia) Konstantin Kravchuk (semifinals)
3. (Argentina) Leonardo Mayer (second round)
4. (Argentina) Marco Trungelliti (quarterfinals)
5. (Germany) Tobias Kamke (first round)
6. (France) Quentin Halys (quarterfinals)
7. (Germany) Peter Gojowczyk (first round)
8. (Belgium) Kimmer Coppejans (first round)

== Draw ==
=== Key ===
- Q = Qualifier
- WC = Wild card
- LL = Lucky loser
- Alt = Alternate
- SE = Special exempt
- PR = Protected ranking
- ITF = ITF entry
- JE = Junior exempt
- w/o = Walkover
- r = Retired
- d = Defaulted
- SR = Special ranking

=== Finals ===
Semifinals
(Russia) Daniil Medvedev	3	7	7^{7}
(Bosnia and Herzegovina) Mirza Bašić	6	5	6^{4}
(Belgium) Joris De Loore	7^{7}	3	6
2	(Russia) Konstantin Kravchuk	6^{3}	6	0

Final
(Russia) Daniil Medvedev	6	6
(Belgium) Joris De Loore	3	3

=== Top half ===
First round
1	(Ukraine) S Stakhovsky	1	6	6^{2}
WC	(France) M Janvier	6	4	7^{7}
(Russia) D Medvedev	6	6
WC	(Germany) M Bachinger	2	3
WC	(France) A Muller	6	5	6
Q	(Italy) Erik Crepaldi	0	7	3
(Italy) M Viola	6	5	6
5	(Germany) T Kamke	1	7	1
4	(Argentina) M Trungelliti	6	6
Q	(France) R Jouan	2	4
(Belgium) Y Mertens	6	5	6
(Spain) A Menéndez-Maceiras	4	7	4
Alt	(Croatia) A Pavić	3	3
(Germany) Y Hanfmann	6	6
(Bosnia and Herzegovina) M Bašić	7	6
8	(Belgium) K Coppejans	5	1

Second round
WC	(France) M Janvier	4	5
(Russia) D Medvedev	6	7
WC	(France) A Muller	1	6	7^{7}
(Italy) M Viola	6	3	6^{5}
4	(Argentina) M Trungelliti	4	6	6
(Belgium) Y Mertens	6	3	3
(Germany) Y Hanfmann	3	3
(Bosnia and Herzegovina) M Bašić	6	6

Quarterfinals
(Russia) D Medvedev	6	6
WC	(France) A Muller	0	0
4	(Argentina) M Trungelliti	6	3	4
(Bosnia and Herzegovina) M Bašić	1	6	6

Semifinals
(Russia) D Medvedev	3	7	7^{7}
(Bosnia and Herzegovina) M Bašić	6	5	6^{4}

=== Bottom half ===
First round
6	(France) Q Halys	6	6
(Republic of Ireland) S Barry	3	3
(Czech Republic) Michal Konečný	4	7^{7}	6^{4}
(United Kingdom) E Corrie	6	6^{4}	7^{7}
(Belgium) J De Loore	7^{7}	7
(France) G Barrère	6^{5}	5
Q	(France) H Grenier	1	1
3	(Argentina) L Mayer	6	6
7	(Germany) P Gojowczyk	6^{5}	3
Q	(France) A Olivetti	7^{7}	6
(Romania) M Copil	3	7^{8}	3
(Belgium) R Bemelmans	6	6^{6}	6
(Bosnia and Herzegovina) A Šetkić	1	3
(France) M Bourgue	6	6
WC	(France) L Lokoli	3	3
2	(Russia) K Kravchuk	6	6

Second round
6	(France) Q Halys	7	7^{7}
(United Kingdom) E Corrie	5	6^{4}
(Belgium) J De Loore	6	3	7^{7}
3	(Argentina) L Mayer	3	6	6^{5}
Q	(France) A Olivetti	6	3	6
(Belgium) R Bemelmans	4	6	3
(France) M Bourge	4	2
2	(Russia) K Kravchuk	6	6

Quarterfinals
6	(France) Q Halys	6^{4}	5
(Belgium) J De Loore	7^{7}	7
Q	(France) A Olivetti	6^{2}	3
2	(Russia) K Kravchuk	7^{7}	6

Semifinals
(Belgium) J De Loore	7^{7}	3	6
2	(Russia) K Kravchuk	6^{4}	6	0
