= 2024 World Tennis League =

- Date: 19–22 December 2024
- Edition: 3rd
- Draw: 4 teams
- Surface: Hard
- Location: Abu Dhabi, United Arab Emirates
- Venue: Etihad Arena

Champions
- Falcons (Rublev, Rybakina, Shapovalov, Garcia)
- World Tennis League

The 2024 World Tennis League was a non-ATP/WTA-affiliated exhibition mixed-gender team tennis tournament. It was the third edition of the World Tennis League. The event was held on hard court at the Etihad Arena in Abu Dhabi, United Arab Emirates from 19 until 22 December 2024.

Team Falcons, composed of Andrey Rublev, Elena Rybakina, Denis Shapovalov and Caroline Garcia, won the title, defeating Team Hawks (Jordan Thompson, Aryna Sabalenka, Sumit Nagal and Mirra Andreeva) in the final, 20–16.

== Format ==
The teams played each other in a round-robin format. Each ties consisted of four sets: one men's singles, one women's singles, and two doubles sets, which may include men's doubles, women's doubles, or mixed doubles, as determined by the team that won the coin toss. They got one point for each game they won in a tie. If the team that won the fourth set is leading the tie, the tie was over. If the team that won the fourth set was trailing in the match, the match went to overtime. If the leading team won one game in overtime, it won the match tie. If the overall game score became equal, a first to 10 'super shoot-out tiebreak was played, which was worth one game point plus two bonus points.

Following the round-robin phase, the top two teams faced off in the final on 22 December 2024.

== Teams and players ==
16 players were drawn into four teams (Eagles, Falcons, Hawks, Kites).

	Eagles		Falcons		Hawks		Kites	
	Player	Rank	Player	Rank	Player	Rank	Player	Rank
Men #1	(Greece) Stefanos Tsitsipas	11	(Russia) Andrey Rublev	8	(Australia) Jordan Thompson	26	(Norway) Casper Ruud	6
Women #1	(Poland) Iga Świątek	2	(Kazakhstan) Elena Rybakina	6	(Belarus) Aryna Sabalenka	1	(Italy) Jasmine Paolini	4
Men #2	(Kazakhstan) Alexander Shevchenko	78	(Canada) Denis Shapovalov	56	(India) Sumit Nagal	98	(Australia) Nick Kyrgios	nr
Women #2	(Spain) Paula Badosa	12	(France) Caroline Garcia	48	(Russia) Mirra Andreeva	16	(Romania) Simona Halep	877

- Singles rankings as of 16 December 2024.
- nr = not ranked

== Results ==
19 December 2024: Falcons def. Hawks 29–26
Event	Falcons	Hawks	Score	Total
Women's doubles	(France) C Garcia / (Kazakhstan) E Rybakina	(Russia) M Andreeva / (Belarus) A Sabalenka	6–7^{(5–7)}	6–7
Women's singles	(Kazakhstan) Elena Rybakina	(Belarus) Aryna Sabalenka	6–7^{(3–7)}	12–14
Men's doubles	(Russia) A Rublev / (Canada) D Shapovalov	(India) S Nagal / (Australia) J Thompson	5–7	17–21
Men's singles	(Russia) Andrey Rublev	(Australia) Jordan Thompson	7–5	24–26
Overtime	(Russia) Andrey Rublev	(Australia) Jordan Thompson	2–0	26–26
Super shoot-out	(Russia) Andrey Rublev	(Australia) Jordan Thompson	1–0^{(10–6)}	27–26
Super shoot-out tiebreak winning bonus			2–0	29–26

19 December 2024: Kites def. Eagles 25–20
Event	Kites	Eagles	Score	Total
Mixed doubles	(Italy) J Paolini / (Norway) C Ruud	(Spain) P Badosa / (Kazakhstan) A Shevchenko	6–4	6–4
Men's singles	(Norway) Casper Ruud	(Kazakhstan) Alexander Shevchenko	6–4	12–8
Women's doubles	(Romania) S Halep / (Italy) J Paolini	(Spain) P Badosa / (Poland) I Świątek	7–5	19–13
Women's singles	(Italy) Jasmine Paolini	(Poland) Iga Świątek	5–7	24–20
Overtime	(Italy) Jasmine Paolini	(Poland) Iga Świątek	1–0	25–20

20 December 2024: Hawks def. Eagles 21–14
Event	Hawks	Eagles	Score	Total
Women's doubles	(Russia) M Andreeva / (Belarus) A Sabalenka	(Spain) P Badosa / (Poland) I Świątek	6–1	6–1
Women's singles	(Belarus) Aryna Sabalenka	(Spain) Paula Badosa	6–2	12–3
Men's doubles	(India) S Nagal / (Australia) J Thompson	(Kazakhstan) A Shevchenko / (Greece) S Tsitsipas	6–4	18–7
Men's singles	(India) Sumit Nagal	(Kazakhstan) Alexander Shevchenko	2–6	20–13
Overtime	(India) Sumit Nagal	(Kazakhstan) Alexander Shevchenko	1–1	21–14

20 December 2024: Falcons def. Kites 24–21
Event	Falcons	Kites	Score	Total
Women's doubles	(France) C Garcia / (Kazakhstan) E Rybakina	(Romania) S Halep / (Italy) J Paolini	7–6^{(7–5)}	7–6
Women's singles	(Kazakhstan) Elena Rybakina	(Romania) Simona Halep	6–4	13–10
Mixed doubles	(France) C Garcia / (Canada) D Shapovalov	(Italy) J Paolini / (Australia) N Kyrgios	5–7	18–17
Men's singles	(Russia) Andrey Rublev	(Australia) Nick Kyrgios	6–4	24–21

21 December 2024: Eagles def. Falcons 20–15
Event	Eagles	Falcons	Score	Total
Women's singles	(Poland) Iga Świątek	(Kazakhstan) Elena Rybakina	6–3	6–3
Women's doubles	(Spain) P Badosa / (Poland) I Świątek	(France) C Garcia / (Kazakhstan) E Rybakina	6–2	12–5
Men's doubles	(Kazakhstan) A Shevchenko / (Greece) S Tsitsipas	(Russia) A Rublev / (Canada) D Shapovalov	6–4	18–9
Men's singles	(Greece) Stefanos Tsitsipas	(Russia) Andrey Rublev	1–6	19–15
Overtime	(Greece) Stefanos Tsitsipas	(Russia) Andrey Rublev	1–0	20–15

21 December 2024: Hawks def. Kites 20–17
Event	Hawks	Kites	Score	Total
Women's doubles	(Russia) M Andreeva / (Belarus) A Sabalenka	(Romania) S Halep / (Italy) J Paolini	6–1	6–1
Women's singles	(Russia) Mirra Andreeva	(Italy) Jasmine Paolini	6–4	12–5
Men's doubles	(India) S Nagal / (Australia) J Thompson	(Australia) N Kyrgios / (Norway) C Ruud	4–6	16–11
Men's singles	(India) Sumit Nagal	(Norway) Casper Ruud	3–6	19–17
Overtime	(India) Sumit Nagal	(Norway) Casper Ruud	1–0	20–17

== Standings ==
A team received 2 bonus points for each super shoot-out tiebreak won. The top two teams qualified for the final.

Rank	Team	Ties	Games	Bonus points	Points total
1	Falcons	2–1	66–67	2	68
2	Hawks	2–1	67–58	0	67
3	Kites	1–2	63–64	0	63
4	Eagles	1–2	54–61	0	54

== Final ==
22 December 2024: Falcons def. Hawks 20–16
Event	Falcons	Hawks	Score	Total
Women's doubles	(France) C Garcia / (Kazakhstan) E Rybakina	(Russia) M Andreeva / (Belarus) A Sabalenka	6–7^{(5–7)}	6–7
Women's singles	(Kazakhstan) Elena Rybakina	(Russia) Mirra Andreeva	2–6	8–13
Men's doubles	(Russia) A Rublev / (Canada) D Shapovalov	(India) S Nagal / (Australia) J Thompson	6–2	14–15
Men's singles	(Russia) Andrey Rublev	(India) Sumit Nagal	6–1	20–16
