= 2023 World Tennis League =

- Date: 21–24 December 2023
- Edition: 2nd
- Draw: 4 teams
- Surface: Hard
- Location: Abu Dhabi, United Arab Emirates
- Venue: Etihad Arena

Champions
- Eagles (Medvedev, Kenin, Rublev, Andreeva)
- World Tennis League

The 2023 World Tennis League was a non-ATP/WTA-affiliated exhibition mixed-gender team tennis tournament. It was the second edition of the World Tennis League. The event was held on hard court at the Etihad Arena in Abu Dhabi, United Arab Emirates from 21 until 24 December 2023.

Defending champions, Team Hawks, failed to qualify for the final, winning only one of three ties.

Team Eagles, composed of Daniil Medvedev, Sofia Kenin, Andrey Rublev and Mirra Andreeva, won the title, defeating Team Kites (Stefanos Tsitsipas, Aryna Sabalenka, Grigor Dimitrov and Paula Badosa) in the final, 29–26.

== Format ==
The teams played each other in a round-robin format. The ties consisted of five sets, each with one men's singles, women's singles, men's doubles, women's doubles and mixed doubles match. They got one point for each game they won in a tie. If the team that won the fifth set was leading the tie, the tie was over. If the team that won the fifth set was trailing in the match, the match went to overtime. If the leading team won one game in overtime, it won the match tie. If the overall game score became equal, a first to 10 'super shoot-out tiebreak' was played, which was worth one game point plus two bonus points.

Following the round-robin phase, the top two teams faced off in the final on 24 December 2023.

== Teams and players ==
16 players were drawn into four teams (Eagles, Falcons, Hawks, Kites).

	Eagles		Falcons		Hawks		Kites	
	Player	Rank	Player	Rank	Player	Rank	Player	Rank
Men #1	(Russia) Daniil Medvedev	3	(United States) Taylor Fritz	10	(Poland) Hubert Hurkacz	9	(Greece) Stefanos Tsitsipas	6
Women #1	(United States) Sofia Kenin	33	(Kazakhstan) Elena Rybakina	4	(Poland) Iga Świątek	1	(Belarus) Aryna Sabalenka	2
Men #2	(Russia) Andrey Rublev	5	(India) Sumit Nagal	138	(Norway) Casper Ruud	11	(Bulgaria) Grigor Dimitrov	14
Women #2	(Russia) Mirra Andreeva	57	(Romania) Sorana Cîrstea	26	(France) Caroline Garcia	20	(Spain) Paula Badosa	64
Alternate			(Russia) Vera Zvonareva	272			(South Africa) Lloyd Harris	140

- Singles rankings as of 18 December 2023.

== Results ==
21 December 2023: Falcons def. Hawks 27–24
Event	Falcons	Hawks	Score	Total
Men's doubles	(United States) Taylor Fritz / (India) Sumit Nagal	(Poland) Hubert Hurkacz / (Norway) Casper Ruud	7–6^{(8–6)}	7–6
Mixed doubles	(Romania) Sorana Cîrstea / (United States) Taylor Fritz	(France) Caroline Garcia / (Poland) Hubert Hurkacz	6–2	13–8
Women's doubles	(Romania) Sorana Cîrstea / (Kazakhstan) Elena Rybakina	(France) Caroline Garcia / (Poland) Iga Świątek	6–4	19–12
Men's singles	(United States) Taylor Fritz	(Norway) Casper Ruud	1–6	20–18
Women's singles	(Kazakhstan) Elena Rybakina	(Poland) Iga Świątek	4–6	24–24
Super shoot-out	(Kazakhstan) Elena Rybakina	(Poland) Iga Świątek	1–0^{(10–8)}	25–24
Super shoot-out tiebreak winning bonus			2–0	27–24

21 December 2023: Kites def. Eagles 27–22
Event	Kites	Eagles	Score	Total
Women's doubles	(Spain) Paula Badosa / (Belarus) Aryna Sabalenka	(Russia) Mirra Andreeva / (United States) Sofia Kenin	6–3	6–3
Mixed doubles	(Spain) Paula Badosa / (Greece) Stefanos Tsitsipas	(United States) Sofia Kenin / (Russia) Daniil Medvedev	6–4	12–7
Men's doubles	(Bulgaria) Grigor Dimitrov / (Greece) Stefanos Tsitsipas	(Russia) Daniil Medvedev / (Russia) Andrey Rublev	6–7^{(3–7)}	18–14
Men's singles	(Bulgaria) Grigor Dimitrov	(Russia) Andrey Rublev	3–6	21–20
Women's singles	(Belarus) Aryna Sabalenka	(Russia) Mirra Andreeva	6–2	27–22

22 December 2023: Kites def. Falcons 33–30
Event	Kites	Falcons	Score	Total
Women's doubles	(Spain) Paula Badosa / (Belarus) Aryna Sabalenka	(Romania) Sorana Cîrstea / (Kazakhstan) Elena Rybakina	6–7^{(5–7)}	6–7
Men's doubles	(Bulgaria) Grigor Dimitrov / (South Africa) Lloyd Harris	(United States) Taylor Fritz / (India) Sumit Nagal	6–7^{(5–7)}	12–14
Mixed doubles	(Spain) Paula Badosa / (South Africa) Lloyd Harris	(Romania) Sorana Cîrstea / (United States) Taylor Fritz	5–7	17–21
Men's singles	(Bulgaria) Grigor Dimitrov	(United States) Taylor Fritz	6–3	23–24
Women's singles	(Belarus) Aryna Sabalenka	(Kazakhstan) Elena Rybakina	7–6^{(7–2)}	30–30
Super shoot-out	(Belarus) Aryna Sabalenka	(Kazakhstan) Elena Rybakina	1–0^{(10–6)}	31–30
Super shoot-out tiebreak winning bonus			2–0	33–30

22 December 2023: Eagles def. Hawks 31–28
Event	Eagles	Hawks	Score	Total
Mixed doubles	(Russia) Mirra Andreeva / (Russia) Andrey Rublev	(Poland) Iga Świątek / (Poland) Hubert Hurkacz	2–6	2–6
Women's doubles	(Russia) Mirra Andreeva / (United States) Sofia Kenin	(France) Caroline Garcia / (Poland) Iga Świątek	6–4	8–10
Men's doubles	(Russia) Daniil Medvedev / (Russia) Andrey Rublev	(Poland) Hubert Hurkacz / (Norway) Casper Ruud	7–6^{(7–1)}	15–16
Women's singles	(United States) Sofia Kenin	(France) Caroline Garcia	7–5	22–21
Men's singles	(Russia) Daniil Medvedev	(Poland) Hubert Hurkacz	6–7^{(4–7)}	28–28
Super shoot-out	(Russia) Daniil Medvedev	(Poland) Hubert Hurkacz	1–0^{(10–4)}	29–28
Super shoot-out tiebreak winning bonus			2–0	31–28

23 December 2023: Eagles def. Falcons 22–18
Event	Eagles	Falcons	Score	Total
Mixed doubles	(Russia) Mirra Andreeva / (Russia) Andrey Rublev	(Russia) Vera Zvonareva / (United States) Taylor Fritz	cancelled	
Women's doubles	(Russia) Mirra Andreeva / (United States) Sofia Kenin	(Romania) Sorana Cîrstea / (Russia) Vera Zvonareva	6–4	6–4
Men's doubles	(Russia) Daniil Medvedev / (Russia) Andrey Rublev	(United States) Taylor Fritz / (India) Sumit Nagal	6–4	12–8
Women's singles	(United States) Sofia Kenin	(Romania) Sorana Cîrstea	6–4	18–12
Men's singles	(Russia) Daniil Medvedev	(United States) Taylor Fritz	3–6	21–18
Overtime	(Russia) Daniil Medvedev	(United States) Taylor Fritz	1–0	22–18

23 December 2023: Hawks def. Kites 20–19
Event	Hawks	Kites	Score	Total
Men's doubles	(Poland) Hubert Hurkacz / (Norway) Casper Ruud	(Bulgaria) Grigor Dimitrov / (South Africa) Lloyd Harris	4–6	4–6
Mixed doubles	(France) Caroline Garcia / (Poland) Hubert Hurkacz	(Spain) Paula Badosa / (South Africa) Lloyd Harris	cancelled	
Women's doubles	(France) Caroline Garcia / (Poland) Iga Świątek	(Spain) Paula Badosa / (Belarus) Aryna Sabalenka	6–3	10–9
Women's singles	(Poland) Iga Świątek	(Belarus) Aryna Sabalenka	4–6	14–15
Men's singles	(Norway) Casper Ruud	(Bulgaria) Grigor Dimitrov	6–4	20–19

== Standings ==
A team received 2 bonus points for each super shoot-out tiebreak won. The top two teams qualified for the final.

Rank	Team	Ties	Games	Bonus points	Points total
1	Kites	2–1	77–72	2	79
2	Eagles	2–1	73–73	2	75
3	Falcons	1–2	73–77	2	75
4	Hawks	1–2	72–73	0	72

== Final ==
24 December 2023: Eagles def. Kites 29–26
Event	Eagles	Kites	Score	Total
Mixed doubles	(Russia) Mirra Andreeva / (Russia) Daniil Medvedev	(Spain) Paula Badosa / (Greece) Stefanos Tsitsipas	6–7^{(5–7)}	6–7
Women's doubles	(Russia) Mirra Andreeva / (United States) Sofia Kenin	(Spain) Paula Badosa / (Belarus) Aryna Sabalenka	7–5	13–12
Men's doubles	(Russia) Daniil Medvedev / (Russia) Andrey Rublev	(Bulgaria) Grigor Dimitrov / (South Africa) Lloyd Harris	6–3	19–15
Women's singles	(United States) Sofia Kenin	(Belarus) Aryna Sabalenka	6–4	25–19
Men's singles	(Russia) Andrey Rublev	(Bulgaria) Grigor Dimitrov	3–6	28–25
Overtime	(Russia) Andrey Rublev	(Bulgaria) Grigor Dimitrov	1–1	29–26
