= World Tennis League =

- 2025 World Tennis League

Exhibition
- Founded: 2022
- Location: Dubai (2022), Abu Dhabi (2023-2024), Bengaluru (2025-present); United Arab Emirates (2022-2024), India (2025)
- Venue: Coca-Cola Arena (2022), Etihad Arena (2023-2024); SM Krishna Tennis Stadium (2025-present)
- Category: Exhibition
- Draw: 4 teams
- Website: worldtennisleague.com

The World Tennis League is a non-ATP/WTA-affiliated exhibition mixed-gender team tennis tournament which is held annually in the. The first edition was held at the Coca-Cola Arena in Dubai in December 2022. The second edition and third edition were held at the Etihad Arena in Abu Dhabi in December 2023 and 2024 respectively. The fourth edition will be held at the SM Krishna Tennis Stadium in Bengaluru, India December 2025.

== Format ==
The players are divided into four teams, each with four players (two men and two women). The four teams have been named Eagles, Falcons, Hawks and Kites. The teams play each other in a round-robin format, which since 2024 has consisted of a men's singles, a women's singles, and two doubles matches, which may include men's doubles, women's doubles, or mixed doubles. Following the round-robin phase, the top two teams face off in the final.

== Editions ==
Year	Location	Venue	Dates
2022	(United Arab Emirates) Dubai, UAE	Coca-Cola Arena	December 19–24, 2022
2023	(United Arab Emirates) Abu Dhabi, UAE	Etihad Arena	December 21–24, 2023
2024	(United Arab Emirates) Abu Dhabi, UAE	Etihad Arena	December 19–22, 2024
2025	Bengaluru, India	SM Krishna Tennis Stadium	December 17–20, 2025

== Finals ==
Year	Champion	Runner-up	Score
2022	Hawks (Zverev, Rybakina, Thiem, Pavlyuchenkova)	Kites (Auger-Aliassime, Świątek, Rune, Mirza)	32–25
2023	Eagles (Medvedev, Kenin, Rublev, Andreeva)	Kites (Tsitsipas, Sabalenka, Dimitrov, Badosa, Harris)	29–26
2024	Falcons (Rublev, Rybakina, Shapovalov, Garcia)	Hawks (Thompson, Sabalenka, Nagal, Andreeva)	20–16
2025	Kites (Kyrgios, Kostyuk, Suresh, Raina)	Eagles (Monfils, Badosa, Nagal, Bhamidipaty)	22–19

== See also ==
- Tennis Premier League
