= 2025 ITF Bengaluru Open – Doubles =

Doubles
- 2025 ITF Bengaluru Open

Final
- Champions: (United States) Jessie Aney (United States) Jessica Failla
- Runners-up: Amina Anshba; Elena Pridankina
- Score: 6–2, 4–6, [10–6]

Events
Singles	Doubles
- ITF Bengaluru Open

Camilla Rosatello and Darja Semeņistaja were the defending champions, but Rosatello chose to participate at the Australian Open. Semeņistaja partnered with Diāna Marcinkēviča, but they lost in the first round to Jessie Aney and Jessica Failla.

Aney and Failla won the title, defeating Amina Anshba and Elena Pridankina in the final, 6–2, 4–6, [10–6].

== Seeds ==
1. Amina Anshba / Elena Pridankina (final)
2. Maria Kozyreva / Iryna Shymanovich (first round)
3. (Slovenia) Dalila Jakupović / (Brazil) Laura Pigossi (quarterfinals)
4. (United States) Jessie Aney / (United States) Jessica Failla (champions)

== Draw ==
Key

- Q = Qualifier
- WC = Wild card
- LL = Lucky loser
- Alt = Alternate
- ITF = ITF entry
- PR = Protected ranking
- SR = Special ranking
- SE = Special exempt
- JE = Junior exempt
- JR = Junior Accelerator Programme entrant
- CO = College Accelerator Programme entrant
- NG = Next Gen Accelerator Program entrant
- w/o = Walkover
- r = Retired
- d = Defaulted

=== Draw ===
First round
1	A Anshba; E Pridankina	6	7^{7}
(India) R Bhatia (India) Z Desai	3	6^{4}
(India) R Bhosale (Japan) N Sato	3	4
(Indonesia) PM Nugroho (United States) A Smith	6	6
3	(Slovenia) D Jakupović (Brazil) L Pigossi	6	6
(United Kingdom) N Bains (India) A Raina	3	2
(United Kingdom) A Barnett (India) P Thombare	6	6
WC	(India) AD Nitture (India) S Sadiq	1	2
(Czech Republic) B Fruhvirtová (Czech Republic) L Fruhvirtová	6	6^{5}	[11]
(India) V Adkar (India) S Yamalapalli	2	7^{7}	[9]
(Latvia) D Marcinkēviča (Latvia) D Semeņistaja	2	1
4	(United States) J Aney (United States) J Failla	6	6
(Israel) L Glushko; A Tikhonova	6	4	[10]
A Ibragimova; E Yashina	4	6	[5]
(Algeria) I Ibbou (Switzerland) N Karamoko	6^{6}	7	[13]
2	M Kozyreva; I Shymanovich	7^{8}	5	[11]

Quarterfinals
1	A Anshba; E Pridankina	7^{7}	2	[10]
(Indonesia) PM Nugroho (United States) A Smith	6^{5}	6	[3]
3	(Slovenia) D Jakupović (Brazil) L Pigossi	6	3	[2]
(United Kingdom) A Barnett (India) P Thombare	3	6	[10]
(Czech Republic) B Fruhvirtová (Czech Republic) L Fruhvirtová
4	(United States) J Aney (United States) J Failla	w/o
(Israel) L Glushko; A Tikhonova	3	6	[10]
(Algeria) I Ibbou (Switzerland) N Karamoko	6	3	[8]

Semifinals
1	A Anshba; E Pridankina	6	6
(United Kingdom) A Barnett (India) P Thombare	3	2
4	(United States) J Aney (United States) J Failla	1	6	[10]
(Israel) L Glushko; A Tikhonova	6	2	[6]

Final
1	A Anshba; E Pridankina	2	6	[6]
4	(United States) J Aney (United States) J Failla	6	4	[10]
