= 2025 ITF Bengaluru Open =

Tennis tournament

- Date: 20–26 January 2025
- Edition: 2nd
- Category: ITF Women's World Tennis Tour
- Prize money: $100,000
- Surface: Hard / Outdoor
- Location: Bengaluru, India

Champions

Singles
- (Germany) Tatjana Maria

Doubles
- (United States) Jessie Aney / (United States) Jessica Failla
← 2024 ·	ITF Bengaluru Open	· 2026 →

The 2025 ITF Bengaluru Open is a professional tennis tournament played on outdoor hard courts.It is the second edition of the tournament which is part of the 2025 ITF Women's World Tennis Tour. It took place in Bengaluru, India between 20 and 26 January 2025.

== Champions ==
=== Singles ===
- (Germany) Tatjana Maria def. (France) Léolia Jeanjean 6–7^{(0–7)}, 6–3, 6–4.

=== Doubles ===
- (United States) Jessie Aney / (United States) Jessica Failla def. Amina Anshba / Elena Pridankina 6–2, 4–6, [10–6].

== Singles main draw entrants ==
=== Seeds ===
Country	Player	Rank^{1}	Seed
GER	Tatjana Maria	90	1
CAN	Rebecca Marino	98	2
LAT	Darja Semeņistaja	118	3
	Maria Timofeeva	134	4
PHI	Alexandra Eala	136	5
THA	Mananchaya Sawangkaew	137	6
FRA	Léolia Jeanjean	149	7
CZE	Sára Bejlek	155	8

- ^{1} Rankings are as of 13 January 2025.

=== Other entrants ===
The following players received wildcards into the singles main draw:

- (India) Shrivalli Bhamidipaty
- (India) Vaidehi Chaudhari
- (India) Ankita Raina
- (India) Sahaja Yamalapalli

The following players received entry from the qualifying draw:

- (Slovenia) Dalila Jakupović
- Maria Kozyreva
- Daria Kudashova
- (Croatia) Petra Marčinko
- (Indonesia) Priska Madelyn Nugroho
- Iryna Shymanovich
- (Australia) Tina Nadine Smith
- (Indonesia) Janice Tjen

The following player received entry as a lucky loser:

- (India) Riya Bhatia
