= 2024 Città di Grado Tennis Cup – Singles =

Singles
- 2024 Città di Grado Tennis Cup

Final
- Champion: (United Kingdom) Francesca Jones
- Runner-up: (Liechtenstein) Kathinka von Deichmann
- Score: 6–1, 7–5

Events
Singles	Doubles
← 2023 ·	Città di Grado Tennis Cup	· 2025 →

Yuliya Hatouka was the defending champion but chose not to participate.

Francesca Jones won the title, defeating Kathinka von Deichmann in the final, 6–1, 7–5.

== Seeds ==
1. (United States) Louisa Chirico (quarterfinals)
2. (Liechtenstein) Kathinka von Deichmann (final)
3. (Greece) Sapfo Sakellaridi (first round)
4. (Ukraine) Anastasiya Soboleva (semifinals)
5. (United Kingdom) Amarni Banks (withdrew)
6. (Netherlands) Lesley Pattinama Kerkhove (first round)
7. Elena Pridankina (semifinals)
8. (United Kingdom) Francesca Jones (champion)

== Draw ==
=== Key ===
- Q = Qualifier
- WC = Wild card
- LL = Lucky loser
- Alt = Alternate
- SE = Special exempt
- PR = Protected ranking
- ITF = ITF entry
- JE = Junior exempt
- w/o = Walkover
- r = Retired
- d = Defaulted
- SR = Special ranking

=== Finals ===
Semifinals
8/SR	(United Kingdom) Francesca Jones	7	6
4	(Ukraine) Anastasiya Soboleva	5	2
7	Elena Pridankina	6	3	3
2	(Liechtenstein) Kathinka von Deichmann	4	6	6

Final
8/SR	(United Kingdom) Francesca Jones	6	7
2	(Liechtenstein) Kathinka von Deichmann	1	5

=== Top half ===
First round
1	(United States) L Chirico	6	6
Q	(Italy) N Fossa Huergo	3	3
WC	(Italy) F Urgesi	1	6	6
M Melnikova	6	4	4
WC	(Italy) E Alvisi	6	4	7
Q	(Ukraine) V Podrez	4	6	5
LL	(United Kingdom) E Silva	6	6^{3}	1
8/SR	(United Kingdom) F Jones	3	7^{7}	6
4	(Ukraine) A Soboleva	6	6
Q	(France) A Ramé	3	1
SE	(Italy) T Pieri	3	3
(Switzerland) S Bandecchi	6	6
(Israel) L Glushko	7	6
(Italy) M Tona	5	4
WC	(Italy) A Zucchini	6	7^{7}
6	(Netherlands) L Pattinama Kerkhove	3	6^{3}

Second round
1	(United States) L Chirico	7^{8}	7
WC	(Italy) F Urgesi	6^{6}	5
WC	(Italy) E Alvisi	4	2
8/SR	(United Kingdom) F Jones	6	6
4	(Ukraine) A Soboleva	7^{7}	6
(Switzerland) S Bandecchi	6^{5}	4
(Israel) L Glushko	6	6
WC	(Italy) A Zucchini	1	2

Quarterfinals
1	(United States) L Chirico	4	4
8/SR	(United Kingdom) F Jones	6	6
4	(Ukraine) A Soboleva	7^{9}	6
(Israel) L Glushko	6^{7}	2

Semifinals
8/SR	(United Kingdom) F Jones	7	6
4	(Ukraine) A Soboleva	5	2

=== Bottom half ===
First round
7	E Pridankina	6	6
(United Kingdom) E Appleton	1	3
Q	A Anshba	6	3	7
(United States) J Aney	2	6	5
(Switzerland) C Perrin	6^{3}	4
(Italy) A Zantedeschi	7^{7}	6
(Spain) L Cortez Llorca	6	6
3	(Greece) S Sakellaridi	4	1
Q	(Italy) A Mazzola	6	6
Q	(Brazil) G Cé	4	2
WC	(Italy) B Ricci	6	6
Q	(Italy) D Chiesa	4	4
Q	(Turkey) Ç Büyükakçay	7	0	6
(Australia) K McPhee	5	6	3
A Ibragimova	2	3
2	(Liechtenstein) K von Deichmann	6	6

Second round
7	E Pridankina	6	6
Q	A Anshba	2	2
(Italy) A Zantedeschi	6	6
(Spain) L Cortez Llorca	4	4
Q	(Italy) A Mazzola	2	1
WC	(Italy) B Ricci	6	6
Q	(Turkey) Ç Büyükakçay	5	2
2	(Liechtenstein) K von Deichmann	7	6

Quarterfinals
7	E Pridankina	6	1
(Italy) A Zantedeschi	2	0^{r}
WC	(Italy) B Ricci	4	2
2	(Liechtenstein) K von Deichmann	6	6

Semifinals
7	E Pridankina	6	3	3
2	(Liechtenstein) K von Deichmann	4	6	6
