= 2023 Città di Grado Tennis Cup =

Tennis tournament

- Date: 22–28 May 2023
- Edition: 26th
- Category: ITF Women's World Tennis Tour
- Prize money: $60,000
- Surface: Clay / Outdoor
- Location: Grado, Italy

Champions

Singles
- Yuliya Hatouka

Doubles
- (United Kingdom) Emily Appleton / (Germany) Julia Lohoff
← 2022 ·	Città di Grado Tennis Cup	· 2024 →

The 2023 Città di Grado Tennis Cup was a professional tennis tournament played on outdoor clay courts. It was the twenty-sixth edition of the tournament, which was part of the 2023 ITF Women's World Tennis Tour. It took place in Grado, Italy, between 22 and 28 May 2023.

== Champions ==
=== Singles ===
- Yuliya Hatouka def. (Czech Republic) Lucie Havlíčková, 2–6, 6–3, 6–1

=== Doubles ===
- (United Kingdom) Emily Appleton / (Germany) Julia Lohoff def. Sofya Lansere / (Czech Republic) Anna Sisková, 3–6, 6–4, [11–9]

== Singles main draw entrants ==
=== Seeds ===
Country	Player	Rank	Seed
CRO	Tena Lukas	222	1
USA	Hailey Baptiste	231	2
TUR	Zeynep Sönmez	232	3
USA	Asia Muhammad	256	4
ESP	Irene Burillo Escorihuela	268	5
CZE	Lucie Havlíčková	270	6
ITA	Camilla Rosatello	296	7
	Yuliya Hatouka	310	8

- Rankings are as of 15 May 2023.

=== Other entrants ===
The following players received wildcards into the singles main draw:

- (Italy) Anastasia Abbagnato
- (Czech Republic) Lucie Havlíčková
- (Italy) Georgia Pedone
- (Italy) Aurora Zantedeschi

The following players received entry from the qualifying draw:

- (Italy) Martina Caregaro
- (Romania) Oana Gavrilă
- (Italy) Chiara Girelli
- (United States) Quinn Gleason
- (Slovakia) Sofia Milatová
- (Poland) Marcelina Podlińska
- (United States) Christina Rosca
- (Romania) Maria Toma
