= 2026 Chennai Open =

- Date: 2–9 November
- Edition: 9th (3rd as Chennai Open)
- Category: WTA 250
- Draw: 32S / 16D
- Prize money: $283,347
- Surface: Hard / outdoor
- Location: Chennai, India
- Venue: SDAT Tennis Stadium, Nungambakkam

Champions

Singles
- (Poland) Magda Linette

Doubles
- (Switzerland) Naïma Karamoko / (Switzerland) Simona Waltert
- WTA Indian Open

The 2026 Chennai Open was a professional women's tennis tournament. It was the third edition of the Chennai Open and part of the 2026 WTA Tour in the 250 category.

This was the last edition of the tournament as it is slated to be relocated to Manila in 2027 due to the rapidly increasing fan base of Alexandra Eala. It is played on outdoor hardcourts.

The singles final was postponed to 9th November (Monday), first of all due to rain, followed by pollution caused by firecrackers on Diwali Sunday.

== Finals ==
=== Singles ===
- (Poland) Magda Linette def. (Indonesia) Janice Tjen 5–7, 6–1, 6–4

=== Doubles ===
- (Switzerland) Naïma Karamoko / (Switzerland) Simona Waltert def. (India) Vaishnavi Adkar / (India) Rutuja Bhosale 6–2, 6–0

== Singles main-draw entrants ==
=== Seeds ===
Country	Player	Rank^{1}	Seed
INA	Janice Tjen	47	1
~~AUT~~	~~Lilli Tagger~~	~~53~~	~~2~~
POL	Magda Linette	71	3
HUN	Panna Udvardy	78	4
THA	Mananchaya Sawangkaew	80	5
UZB	Polina Kudermetova	91	6
	Anastasia Zakharova	105	7
POL	Katarzyna Kawa	106	8
~~GBR~~	~~Harriet Dart~~	~~115~~	~~9~~
ITA	Lucrezia Stefanini	118	10

- Rankings are as of 26 October 2026.

=== Other entrants ===
The following players received wildcards into the singles main draw:

- (India) Vaishnavi Adkar
- (United States) Katherine Hui
- (India) Maaya Rajeshwaran Revathi
- (India) Sahaja Yamalapalli

The following player received entry using a protected ranking:

- (United Kingdom) Jodie Burrage

The following players received entry from the qualifying draw:

- Aliona Falei
- (Poland) Weronika Falkowska
- (Kazakhstan) Zhibek Kulambayeva
- (Japan) Kyōka Okamura

The following players received entry as lucky losers:

- (Slovakia) Viktória Morvayová
- (Japan) Mei Yamaguchi
- Rada Zolotareva

=== Withdrawals ===
- (United Kingdom) Harriet Dart → replaced by (Slovakia) Viktória Morvayová (LL)
- (Croatia) Petra Marčinko → replaced by (Slovakia) Rebecca Šramková
- (Germany) Tatjana Maria → replaced by (Japan) Mai Hontama
- (Kazakhstan) Yulia Putintseva → replaced by Rada Zolotareva (LL)
- (Austria) Lilli Tagger → replaced by (Japan) Mei Yamaguchi (LL)
- (Thailand) Lanlana Tararudee → replaced by Polina Iatcenko

=== Retirements ===
- (Italy) Lucrezia Stefanini (ankle injury)
- Mariia Tkacheva (illness)

== Doubles main-draw entrants ==
=== Seeds ===
Country	Player	Country	Player	Rank^{1}	Seed
JPN	Momoko Kobori	THA	Peangtarn Plipuech	178	1
POL	Weronika Falkowska	USA	Alana Smith	213	2
CZE	Aneta Kučmová	CZE	Aneta Laboutková	229	3
GBR	Madeleine Brooks	GBR	Amelia Rajecki	244	4

- ^{1} Rankings are as of 26 October 2026

=== Other entrants ===
The following teams received wildcards into the doubles main draw:

- (India) Shrivalli Bhamidipaty / (India) Maaya Rajeshwaran Revathi
- (India) Diya Ramesh Ramesh / (India) Deepshika Vinayagamurthy
