= 2025 Città di Grado Tennis Cup – Doubles =

Doubles
- 2025 Città di Grado Tennis Cup

Final
- Champions: (United States) Quinn Gleason (Brazil) Ingrid Martins
- Runners-up: (Slovenia) Veronika Erjavec (Czech Republic) Dominika Šalková
- Score: 6–2, 5–7, [10–5]

Events
Singles	Doubles
← 2024 ·	Città di Grado Tennis Cup	· 2026 →

Quinn Gleason and Ingrid Martins won the doubles title at the 2025 Città di Grado Tennis Cup, defeating Veronika Erjavec and Dominika Šalková in the final, 6–2, 5–7, [10–5].

Jessie Aney and Lena Papadakis were the reigning champions, but did not participate this year.

== Seeds ==
1. (United States) Quinn Gleason / (Brazil) Ingrid Martins (champions)
2. (Mexico) Renata Zarazúa / (Belgium) Kimberley Zimmermann (semifinals)
3. (Czech Republic) Jesika Malečková / (Czech Republic) Miriam Škoch (semifinals)
4. (France) Estelle Cascino / (Croatia) Tara Würth (quarterfinals)

== Draw ==
=== Key ===
- Q = Qualifier
- WC = Wild card
- LL = Lucky loser
- Alt = Alternate
- ITF = ITF entry
- PR = Protected ranking
- SR = Special ranking
- SE = Special exempt
- JE = Junior exempt
- JR = Junior Accelerator Programme entrant
- CO = College Accelerator Programme entrant
- NG = Next Gen Accelerator Program entrant
- w/o = Walkover
- r = Retired
- d = Defaulted

=== Draw ===
First round
1	(United States) Q Gleason (Brazil) I Martins	6	6
(Venezuela) A Gámiz (Netherlands) E Vedder	1	2
(Czech Republic) B Palicová; T Prozorova	4	2
(Germany) A Fomina-Klotz (Burundi) S Nahimana	6	6
3	(Czech Republic) J Malečková (Czech Republic) M Škoch	6	6
Alt	(Italy) Ca Franzin (Italy) Ce Franzin	0	0
(United States) R McAdoo (Colombia) MP Pérez	6	6
(Italy) G Pedone (Italy) F Urgesi	4	3
(Slovenia) V Erjavec (Czech Republic) D Šalková	6	6
E Ovcharenko (United Kingdom) E Webley-Smith	4	1
(Croatia) P Marčinko (Australia) T Preston	4	6^{8}
4	(France) E Cascino (Croatia) T Würth	6	7^{10}
(Poland) W Falkowska (Germany) N Noha Akugue	6	1	[12]
(Chinese Taipei) I-h Cho (Chinese Taipei) Y-t Cho	4	6	[10]
(Italy) T Pieri (Italy) D Spiteri	7	2	[6]
2	(Mexico) R Zarazúa (Belgium) K Zimmermann	5	6	[10]

Quarterfinals
1	(United States) Q Gleason (Brazil) I Martins	6	6
(Germany) A Fomina-Klotz (Burundi) S Nahimana	2	2
3	(Czech Republic) J Malečková (Czech Republic) M Škoch	7^{7}	2	[10]
(United States) R McAdoo (Colombia) MP Pérez	6^{5}	6	[4]
(Slovenia) V Erjavec (Czech Republic) D Šalková	7	6
4	(France) E Cascino (Croatia) T Würth	5	2
(Poland) W Falkowska (Germany) N Noha Akugue	6	5	[9]
2	(Mexico) R Zarazúa (Belgium) K Zimmermann	4	7	[11]

Semifinals
1	(United States) Q Gleason (Brazil) I Martins	6	4	[10]
3	(Czech Republic) J Malečková (Czech Republic) M Škoch	2	6	[4]
(Slovenia) V Erjavec (Czech Republic) D Šalková	6	6
2	(Mexico) R Zarazúa (Belgium) K Zimmermann	2	2

Final
1	(United States) Q Gleason (Brazil) I Martins	6	5	[10]
(Slovenia) V Erjavec (Czech Republic) D Šalková	2	7	[5]
