= 2026 ITF Bengaluru Open – Singles =

Singles
- 2026 ITF Bengaluru Open

Final
- Champion: (Belgium) Hanne Vandewinkel
- Runner-up: (India) Vaishnavi Adkar
- Score: 6–0, 6–1

Events
| Singles | Doubles |
- ITF Bengaluru Open

Tatjana Maria was the defending champion, but chose to compete in Dubai instead.

Hanne Vandewinkel won the title, defeating Vaishnavi Adkar in the final, 6–0, 6–1.

== Seeds ==
1. (Australia) Talia Gibson (quarterfinals)
2. (Thailand) Lanlana Tararudee (semifinals)
3. (Belgium) Hanne Vandewinkel (champion)
4. (Australia) Taylah Preston (quarterfinals)
5. Polina Iatcenko (semifinals)
6. (United Kingdom) Harriet Dart (first round)
7. Elena Pridankina (quarterfinals)
8. (Japan) Mai Hontama (second round)

== Draw ==
Key

- Q = Qualifier
- WC = Wild card
- LL = Lucky loser
- Alt = Alternate
- ITF = ITF entry
- PR = Protected ranking
- SR = Special ranking
- SE = Special exempt
- JE = Junior exempt
- JR = Junior Accelerator Programme entrant
- CO = College Accelerator Programme entrant
- NG = Next Gen Accelerator Program entrant
- w/o = Walkover
- r = Retired
- d = Defaulted

=== Finals ===
Semifinals
5 | Polina Iatcenko | 4 | 6^{5}
3 | (Belgium) Hanne Vandewinkel | 6 | 7^{7}
WC | (India) Vaishnavi Adkar | 6 | 6
2 | (Thailand) Lanlana Tararudee | 3 | 3

Final
3 | (Belgium) Hanne Vandewinkel | 6 | 6
WC | (India) Vaishnavi Adkar | 0 | 1

=== Top half ===
First round
1 | (Australia) T Gibson | 6 | 6
WC | (India) V Chaudhari | 4 | 0
(South Korea) D-y Back | 2 | 6 | 2
(India) S Yamalapalli | 6 | 1 | 6
(Indonesia) P Nugroho | 2 | 3
Q | (Romania) AG Vasilescu | 6 | 6
WC | (India) M Rajeshwaran Revathi | 1 | 6 | 0
5 | P Iatcenko | 6 | 1 | 6
3 | (Belgium) H Vandewinkel | 6 | 6
SR | (Chinese Taipei) Y-h Lee | 1 | 2
(Malta) F Curmi | 6^{6} | 4
WC | (India) S Bhamidipaty | 7^{8} | 6
(Argentina) N Fossa Huergo | 6^{12} | 0^{r}
E Andreeva | 7^{14} | 1
(China) F Tian | 6 | 7^{7}
6 | (United Kingdom) H Dart | 2 | 6^{5}

Second round
1 | (Australia) T Gibson | 6 | 6
(India) S Yamalapalli | 0 | 0
Q | (Romania) AG Vasilescu | 7^{8} | 3 | 2
5 | P Iatcenko | 6^{6} | 6 | 6
3 | (Belgium) H Vandewinkel | 6 | 6^{7} | 6
WC | (India) S Bhamidipaty | 2 | 7^{9} | 1
E Andreeva | 4 | 3
(China) F Tian | 6 | 6

Quarterfinals
1 | (Australia) T Gibson | 2 | 5
5 | P Iatcenko | 6 | 7
3 | (Belgium) H Vandewinkel | 6 | 6
(China) F Tian | 2 | 2

Semifinals
5 | P Iatcenko | 4 | 6^{5}
3 | (Belgium) H Vandewinkel | 6 | 7^{7}

=== Bottom half ===
First round
8 | (Japan) M Hontama | 6 | 6
(Italy) D Cherubini | 2 | 1
WC | (India) S Ahlawat | 1 | 6^{6}
WC | (India) V Adkar | 6 | 7^{8}
(South Korea) S-h Park | 6 | 2 | 3
Q | K Sidorova | 4 | 6 | 6
Q | (Poland) Z Pawlikowska | 3 | 2
4 | (Australia) T Preston | 6 | 6
7 | E Pridankina | 7^{7} | 6
Q | E Shimizu | 6^{5} | 4
Q | (Japan) M Matsuda | 5 | 5
Q | (Netherlands) J Gimbrère | 7 | 7
(Japan) M Yamaguchi | 3 | 6 | 6
Q | (Finland) A Kulikova | 6 | 0 | 1
LL | V Milovanova | 1 | 4
2 | (Thailand) L Tararudee | 6 | 6

Second round
8 | (Japan) M Hontama | 6 | 4 | 6^{8}
WC | (India) V Adkar | 2 | 6 | 7^{10}
Q | K Sidorova | 3 | 3
4 | (Australia) T Preston | 6 | 6
7 | E Pridankina | 6 | 6
Q | (Netherlands) J Gimbrère | 0 | 1
(Japan) M Yamaguchi | 4 | 4
2 | (Thailand) L Tararudee | 6 | 6

Quarterfinals
WC | (India) V Adkar | 6 | 1 | 6
4 | (Australia) T Preston | 3 | 6 | 4
7 | E Pridankina | 1 | 3
2 | (Thailand) L Tararudee | 6 | 6

Semifinals
WC | (India) V Adkar | 6 | 6
2 | (Thailand) L Tararudee | 3 | 3
