= Tennis in India =

- Country: India
- Governing body: All India Tennis Association
- National teams: Davis Cup; Billie Jean King Cup; Hopman Cup

Club competitions
- Tennis Premier League (2018–present)

Tennis enjoys a considerable following in India. Although it is limited to urban areas but still it is counted among the most popular national sports. India has produced a number of tennis players, who have achieved international recognition and made their presence in some of the top tennis tournaments and grand slams. All India Tennis Association established in 1920, is the governing body of tennis in India and is a member of the Asian Tennis Federation. India Davis Cup team is the most successful team of Asia in Davis Cup, who has finished as runners-up 3 times.

== History ==
Tennis has been a popular sport in India since around the 1880s when the British Army and civilian officers brought the game to India. Soon after regular tournaments like the Punjab Lawn Tennis Championship at Lahore (Pakistan, 1885); Bengal Lawn Tennis Championship at Calcutta (1887), and the All India Tennis Championships at Allahabad (1910) were organised. In the history of major tournaments, India has already beaten among others France, Romania, Holland, Belgium, Spain and Greece in Davis Cup ties (1921 to 1929).

The history of tennis in India goes back a long way. In the 1880s, the British introduced the game of tennis in India during the colonial rule and soon it started gaining momentum. BK Nehru in 1905 and Sardar Nihal Singh in 1908 were later joined by Mohammed Sleem, Fayzee brothers and Jagat Mohan Lal who made it to last 16 stages at the Wimbledon. Ghaus Mohammad was the first Indian to reach the quarterfinals at Wimbledon in 1939 where he lost to American champion Bobby Riggs.

According to the All India Tennis Association, in Davis Cup ties between 1921 and 1929, India beat, among others, France, Romania, Holland, Belgium, Spain and Greece. Top Indian players like Saleem, the Fayzee brothers, Cotah Ramaswamy and Krishna Prasad beat a large number of ranked European players and teams to bring glory to the nation.

In the 1960s, the sport witnessed a golden era. Ramanathan Krishnan earned his highest seeding – No. 4 in Wimbledon in 1962. In the Davis Cup, India repeatedly became the Zonal Champions. Ramanathan Krishnan, along with Premjit Lall, SP Misra, Jaidip Mukerjea and RK Khanna as the non-playing captain, steered India to the Cup finals in 1966. They lost the Cup but not before Krishnan and Mukerjea beat Newcombe and Tony Roche, the Wimbledon champions, (1965) in doubles.

In the 1970s, Vijay Amritraj burst onto the scene. With teammates Sashi Menon, Jasjit Singh and brother Anand Amritraj, Vijay took India to World Cup Finals for the second time in 1974. Vijay also made it to the quarterfinals of US Open in 1973 and 1981; and Wimbledon in 1973 and 1974. Ramesh Krishnan, the son of Ramanathan Krishnan, won the junior Wimbledon championship and junior French Open title in 1979 and was ranked number 1 junior in the world. He made it to the quarterfinals at Wimbledon (1986) and US Open (twice).

The 1990s saw the rise of Leander Paes who won the bronze medal at the 1996 Summer Olympics. In 1997, Mahesh Bhupathi became India's first ever grand slam winner when he won the mixed doubles at French Open. Paes partnered with Bhupati to reach the finals of all four grand slams in 1999, winning two. In the 2000s and 2010s, playing separately or together, Paes and Bhupati won several grand slam doubles and mixed doubles tournaments.

The 2000s saw India's first WTA tournament winner Sania Mirza. Mirza also won a number of grand slam titles in doubles in the late 2000s and 2010s.

India's last 2010s grand slam win came in 2017 when Rohan Bopanna won the mixed doubles title at French Open. At the end of 2010s, Prajnesh Gunneswaran was the only Indian men's singles player in the top 100. In 2021 Ankita Raina became the 2nd woman from India to win a WTA title and enter into top 100 doubles rankings. India's latest grand slam win came in 2024 with Rohan Bopanna winning the men's doubles title at Australian Open.

In February 2024, Sumit Nagal made his top 100 debut becoming the tenth Indian tennis player to reach the Top 100, which he reached by defeating Luca Nardi in the final of the Challenger in Chennai.

== Medal table ==
Competition	Gold	Silver	Bronze	Total
Olympic Games	0	0	1	1
Davis Cup	0	3	5	8
Commonwealth Games	1	1	2	4
Asian Games	10	7	17	34
Total	11	11	25	47

- Updated till 5 August 2024

== Current rankings ==
- ATP rankings updated till 2 November 2026.
- WTA rankings updated till 2 November 2026.

=== Men's singles ===
#	Player	Current Rank	Highest Rank
1	Sumit Nagal	265	68
2	Karan Singh	354	354
3	Manas Dhamne	391	384
4	Digvijay Pratap Singh	421	421
5	Dhakshineswar Suresh	448	353
6	Javia Dev	633	604
7	Sidharth Rawat	644	430
8	S D Prajwal Dev	678	595
9	Mukund Sasikumar	696	508
10	Manish Sureshkumar	745	229

=== Women's singles ===
#	Player	Current Rank	Highest Rank
1	Vaishnavi Adkar	334	334
2	Vaidehi Chaudhari	392	355
3	Sahaja Yamalapalli	358	284
4	Ankita Raina	589	160
5	Zeel Desai	612	511
6	Maaya Rajeshwaran Revathi	669	642
7	Shrivalli Bhamidipaty	799	300
8	Shruti Ahlawat	801	752
9	Sonal Patil	918	917
10	Akanksha Nitture	1013	725

=== Men's doubles ===
#	Player	Current Rank	Highest Rank
1	Yuki Bhambri	48	18
2	Sriram Balaji	49	49
3	Niki Kaliyanda Poonacha	73	73
4	Anirudh Chandrasekar	108	84
5	Siddhant Banthia	124	115
6	Arjun Kadhe	145	76
7	Ramkumar Ramanathan	182	58
8	S D Prajwal Dev	190	180
9	Rithvik Choudary Bollipalli	197	65
10	Vijay Sundar Prashanth	222	80

=== Women's doubles ===
#	Player	Current Rank	Highest Rank
1	Rutuja Bhosale	128	121
2	Ankita Raina	143	93
3	Prarthana Thombare	252	125
4	Sahaja Yamalapalli	296	260
5	Vasanti Shinde	311	211
6	Vaishnavi Adkar	359	299
7	Vaidehi Chaudhari	406	304
8	Shrivalli Bhamidipaty	434	266
9	Zeel Desai	501	485
10	Madhurima Sawant	600	543

Source: Tennis Explorer

== Highest ranked players ==
=== Top 100 Ranked Players ===
The list include Indian players who have had a ranking inside the ATP or WTA top 100. The rankings were introduced in 1973 (men) and 1975 (women).

==== Men's Singles ====
Player	Ranking		Date reached top 100	Date reached highest ranking	ATP Tour		
Player	High	Current	Date reached top 100	Date reached highest ranking	Turned Pro	Retired	Titles
Vijay Amritraj	18	N/A	1973, 23 August	1980, 20 October	1970	1993	15
Ramesh Krishnan	23	N/A	1979, 21 May	1985, 28 January	1976	1993	8
Somdev Devvarman	62	N/A	2010, 2 August	2011, 25 July	2002	2016	0
Sumit Nagal	68	277	2024, 15 July	2024, 15 July	2013		0
Sashi Menon	71	N/A	1975, 16 September	1975, 21 October	1970	1985	0
Leander Paes	73	N/A	1997, 8 September	1998, 24 October	1990	2008	1
Anand Amritraj	74	N/A	1973, 26 September	1974, 6 November	1968	1990	0
Prajnesh Gunneswaran	75	N/A	2019, 11 February	2019, 22 April	2007		0
Yuki Bhambri	83	N/A	2015, 19 October	2018, 16 April	2007		0
Jasjit Singh	89	N/A	1973, 26 November	1974, 3 June	1965	1979	0

==== Women's Singles ====
Player	Ranking		Date reached top 100	Date reached highest ranking	WTA Tour		
Player	High	Current	Date reached top 100	Date reached highest ranking	Turned Pro	Retired	Titles
Sania Mirza	27	N/A	2005, 14 February	2007, 27 August	2003	2013	1

== Notable performances at Olympics ==
Year	Event	Player	Result
1924
1924	Men's singles	Sydney Jacob	Quarter-finals
1924	Men's doubles	Syed Mohammad Hadi; Donald Rutnam	Quarter-finals
1992
1992	Men's doubles	Leander Paes; Ramesh Krishnan	Quarter-finals
1996
1996	Men's singles	Leander Paes	3rd place, bronze medalist(s)
2004
2004	Men's doubles	Leander Paes; Mahesh Bhupathi	4th
2008
2008	Men's doubles	Leander Paes; Mahesh Bhupathi	Quarter-finals
2012
2012	Mixed doubles	Leander Paes; Sania Mirza	Quarter-finals
2016
2016	Mixed doubles	Rohan Bopanna; Sania Mirza	4th

== Grand Slam finals ==
In 1997, India won their first Grand Slam title at the French Open, in the mixed doubles. Since then Indians have won Grand Slam titles in the mixed doubles, men's doubles, women's doubles besides girls' doubles events. No Indian has so far won a Grand Slam Singles title in the men's or women's category.

Mixed doubles

Outcome	Year	Championship	Surface	Players	Opponents in the final	Score in the final
Winner	1997	French Open	Clay	(India) Mahesh Bhupathi (Japan) Rika Hiraki	(United States) Patrick Galbraith (United States) Lisa Raymond	6–4, 6–1
Runner-up	1998	Wimbledon	Grass	(India) Mahesh Bhupathi (Croatia) Mirjana Lučić	(United States) Serena Williams (Belarus) Max Mirnyi	4–6, 4–6
Winner	1999	US Open	Hard	(India) Mahesh Bhupathi (Japan) Ai Sugiyama	Donald Johnson (United States) Kimberly Po	6–4, 6–4
Winner	1999	Wimbledon	Grass	(India) Leander Paes (United States) Lisa Raymond	(Russia) Anna Kournikova (Sweden) Jonas Björkman	6–4, 3–6, 6–3
Runner-up	2001	US Open	Hard	(India) Leander Paes (United States) Lisa Raymond	(Australia) Rennae Stubbs (Australia) Todd Woodbridge	6–4, 5–7, 6–7 ^{(9–11)}
Winner	2002	Wimbledon (2)	Grass	(India) Mahesh Bhupathi (Russia) Elena Likhovtseva	(Slovakia) Daniela Hantuchová (Zimbabwe) Kevin Ullyett	6–2, 7–5
Winner	2003	Australian Open	Hard	(India) Leander Paes (United States) Martina Navratilova	(Greece) Eleni Daniilidou (Australia) Todd Woodbridge	6–4, 7–5
Runner-up	2003	French Open	Clay	(India) Mahesh Bhupathi (Russia) Elena Likhovtseva	(United States) Lisa Raymond (United States) Mike Bryan	3–6, 4–6
Winner	2003	Wimbledon (3)	Grass	(India) Leander Paes (United States) Martina Navratilova	(Russia) Anastasia Rodionova (Israel) Andy Ram	6–3, 6–3
Runner-up	2004	Australian Open	Hard	(India) Leander Paes (United States) Martina Navratilova	(Russia) Elena Bovina (Serbia and Montenegro) Nenad Zimonjić	6–1, 7–6
Runner-up	2005	French Open	Clay	(India) Leander Paes (United States) Martina Navratilova	(Slovakia) Daniela Hantuchová (France) Fabrice Santoro	3–6, 6–3, 6–2
Winner	2005	Wimbledon (4)	Grass	(India) Mahesh Bhupathi (France) Mary Pierce	(Ukraine) Tatiana Perebiynis (Australia) Paul Hanley	6–4, 6–2
Winner	2005	US Open (2)	Hard	(India) Mahesh Bhupathi (Slovakia) Daniela Hantuchová	(Slovenia) Katarina Srebotnik (Serbia) Nenad Zimonjić	6–4, 6–2
Winner	2006	Australian Open (2)	Hard	(India) Mahesh Bhupathi (Switzerland) Martina Hingis	(Russia) Elena Likhovtseva (Canada) Daniel Nestor	6–3, 6–3
Runner-up	2007	US Open	Hard	(India) Leander Paes (United States) Meghann Shaughnessy	(Belarus) Victoria Azarenka (Belarus) Max Mirnyi	6–4, 7–6^{(8–6)}
Runner-up	2008	Australian Open	Hard	(India) Mahesh Bhupathi (India) Sania Mirza	(China) Sun Tiantian (Serbia) Nenad Zimonjić	6–7^{(4–7)}, 4–6
Winner	2008	US Open (3)	Hard	(India) Leander Paes (Zimbabwe) Cara Black	(United States) Liezel Huber (United Kingdom) Jamie Murray	7–6, 6–4
Winner	2009	Australian Open (3)	Hard	(India) Mahesh Bhupathi (India) Sania Mirza	(France) Nathalie Dechy (Israel) Andy Ram	6–3, 6–1
Runner-up	2009	Wimbledon	Grass	(India) Leander Paes (Zimbabwe) Cara Black	(Germany) Anna-Lena Grönefeld (The Bahamas) Mark Knowles	7–5, 6–3
Runner-up	2009	US Open	Hard	(India) Leander Paes (Zimbabwe) Cara Black	(United States) Carly Gullickson (United States) Travis Parrot	6–2, 6–4
Winner	2010	Australian Open (4)	Hard	(India) Leander Paes (Zimbabwe) Cara Black	(Russia) Ekaterina Makarova (Czech Republic) Jaroslav Levinský	7–5, 6–3
Winner	2010	Wimbledon (5)	Grass	(India) Leander Paes (Zimbabwe) Cara Black	(United States) Lisa Raymond (South Africa) Wesley Moodie	6–4, 7–6
Runner-up	2011	Wimbledon	Grass	(India) Mahesh Bhupathi (Russia) Elena Vesnina	(Czech Republic) Iveta Benešová (Austria) Jürgen Melzer	3–6, 2–6
Runner-up	2012	Australian Open	Hard	(India) Leander Paes (Russia) Elena Vesnina	(United States) Bethanie Mattek-Sands (Romania) Horia Tecău	3–6, 7–5, [3–10]
Winner	2012	French Open (2)	Clay	(India) Mahesh Bhupathi (India) Sania Mirza	(Poland) Klaudia Jans-Ignacik (Mexico) Santiago González	7–6^{(7–3)}, 6–1
Runner-up	2012	Wimbledon	Grass	(India) Leander Paes (Russia) Elena Vesnina	(United States) Lisa Raymond (United States) Mike Bryan	3–6, 7–5, 4–6
Runner-up	2014	Australian Open	Hard	(Romania) Horia Tecău (India) Sania Mirza	(France) Kristina Mladenovic (Canada) Daniel Nestor	3–6, 2–6
Winner	2014	US Open	Hard	(Brazil) Bruno Soares (India) Sania Mirza	(United States) Abigail Spears (Mexico) Santiago González	6–1, 2–6, [11–9]
Winner	2015	Australian Open (3)	Hard	(India) Leander Paes (Switzerland) Martina Hingis	(France) Kristina Mladenovic (Canada) Daniel Nestor	6–4, 6–3
Winner	2015	Wimbledon (4)	Grass	(India) Leander Paes (Switzerland) Martina Hingis	(Austria) Alexander Peya (Hungary) Tímea Babos	6–1, 6–1
Winner	2017	French Open	Clay	(Canada) Gabriela Dabrowski (India) Rohan Bopanna	(Germany) Anna-Lena Grönefeld (Colombia) Robert Farah	2–6, 6–2, [12–10]
Runner up	2018	Australian Open	Hard	(Hungary) Tímea Babos (India) Rohan Bopanna	(Canada) Gabriela Dabrowski (Croatia) Mate Pavić	6–2, 4–6, [9–11]
Runner up	2023	Australian Open	Hard	(India) Rohan Bopanna (India) Sania Mirza	(Brazil) Luisa Stefani (Brazil) Rafael Matos	6–7^{(2–7)}, 2–6

Men's doubles

Outcome	Year	Championship	Surface	Players	Opponents in the final	Score in the final
Runner-up	1999	Australian Open	Hard	(India) Leander Paes (India) Mahesh Bhupathi	(Sweden) Jonas Björkman (Australia) Patrick Rafter	3–6, 6–4, 4–6, 7–6^{(12–10)}, 4–6
Winner	1999	French Open	Clay	(India) Leander Paes (India) Mahesh Bhupathi	(Croatia) Goran Ivanišević (United States) Jeff Tarango	6–2, 7–5
Winner	1999	Wimbledon	Grass	(India) Leander Paes (India) Mahesh Bhupathi	(Netherlands) Paul Haarhuis (United States) Jared Palmer	6–7, 6–3, 6–4, 7–6
Runner-up	1999	US Open	Hard	(India) Leander Paes (India) Mahesh Bhupathi	(Canada) Sébastien Lareau (United States) Alex O'Brien	6–7, 4–6
Winner	2001	French Open (2)	Clay	(India) Leander Paes (India) Mahesh Bhupathi	(Czech Republic) Petr Pála (Czech Republic) Pavel Vízner	7–6, 6–3
Winner	2002	US Open	Hard	(India) Mahesh Bhupathi (Belarus) Max Mirnyi	(Czech Republic) Jiří Novák (Czech Republic) Radek Štěpánek	6–3, 3–6, 6–4
Runner-up	2003	Wimbledon	Grass	(India) Mahesh Bhupathi (Belarus) Max Mirnyi	(Sweden) Jonas Björkman (Australia) Todd Woodbridge	6–3, 3–6, 6–7^{(4–7)}, 3–6
Runner-up	2004	US Open	Hard	(India) Leander Paes (Czech Republic) David Rikl	(The Bahamas) Mark Knowles (Canada) Daniel Nestor	3–6, 3–6
Runner-up	2006	Australian Open	Hard	(India) Leander Paes (Czech Republic) Martin Damm	(United States) Bob Bryan (United States) Mike Bryan	6–4, 3–6, 4–6
Winner	2006	US Open (2)	Hard	(India) Leander Paes (Czech Republic) Martin Damm	(Sweden) Jonas Björkman (Belarus) Max Mirnyi	6–7^{(5–7)}, 6–4, 6–3
Runner-up	2008	US Open	Hard	(India) Leander Paes (Czech Republic) Lukáš Dlouhý	(United States) Bob Bryan (United States) Mike Bryan	6–7^{(5–7)}, 6–7^{(10–12)}
Runner-up	2009	Australian Open	Hard	(India) Mahesh Bhupathi (The Bahamas) Mark Knowles	(United States) Bob Bryan (United States) Mike Bryan	6–2, 5–7, 0–6
Winner	2009	French Open (3)	Clay	(India) Leander Paes (Czech Republic) Lukáš Dlouhý	(South Africa) Wesley Moodie (Belgium) Dick Norman	3–6, 6–3, 6–2
Runner-up	2009	US Open	Hard	(India) Mahesh Bhupathi (The Bahamas) Mark Knowles	(Czech Republic) Lukáš Dlouhý (India) Leander Paes	6–3, 3–6, 2–6
Winner	2009	US Open (3)	Hard	(India) Leander Paes (Czech Republic) Lukáš Dlouhý	(India) Mahesh Bhupathi (The Bahamas) Mark Knowles	3–6, 6–3, 6–2
Runner-up	2010	French Open	Clay	(India) Leander Paes (Czech Republic) Lukáš Dlouhý	(Serbia) Nenad Zimonjić (Canada) Daniel Nestor	5–7, 2–6
Runner-up	2010	US Open	Hard	(India) Rohan Bopanna (Pakistan) Aisam-ul-Haq Qureshi	(United States) Bob Bryan (United States) Mike Bryan	6–7^{(5–7)}, 6–7^{(4–7)}
Runner-up	2011	Australian Open	Hard	(India) Leander Paes (India) Mahesh Bhupathi	(United States) Bob Bryan (United States) Mike Bryan	3–6, 4–6
Winner	2012	Australian Open	Hard	(India) Leander Paes (Czech Republic) Radek Štěpánek	(United States) Bob Bryan (United States) Mike Bryan	7–6^{(7–1)}, 6–2
Runner-up	2012	US Open	Hard	(India) Leander Paes (Czech Republic) Radek Štěpánek	(United States) Bob Bryan (United States) Mike Bryan	3–6, 4–6
Winner	2013	US Open (4)	Hard	(India) Leander Paes (Czech Republic) Radek Štěpánek	(Austria) Alexander Peya (Brazil) Bruno Soares	6–1, 6–3
Winner	2024	Australian Open	Hard	(India) Rohan Bopanna (Australia) Matthew Ebden	(Italy) Simone Bolelli (Italy) Andrea Vavassori	7–6^{(7–0)}, 7–5

Women's doubles

Outcome	Year	Championship	Surface	Players	Opponents in the final	Score in the final
Runner-up	2011	French Open	Clay	(India) Sania Mirza (Russia) Elena Vesnina	(Czech Republic) Andrea Hlaváčková (Czech Republic) Lucie Hradecká	4–6, 3–6
Winner	2015	Wimbledon	Grass	(India) Sania Mirza (Switzerland) Martina Hingis	(Russia) Ekaterina Makarova (Russia) Elena Vesnina	5–7, 7–6^{(7–4)}, 7–5
Winner	2015	US Open	Hard	(India) Sania Mirza (Switzerland) Martina Hingis	(Australia) Casey Dellacqua (Kazakhstan) Yaroslava Shvedova	6–3, 6–3
Winner	2016	Australian Open	Hard	(India) Sania Mirza (Switzerland) Martina Hingis	(Czech Republic) Andrea Hlaváčková (Czech Republic) Lucie Hradecká	7–6^{(7–1)}, 6–3

== National award recipients ==
Year	Recipient	Award	Gender
1996–1997	Leander Paes	Rajiv Gandhi Khel Ratna	Male
2015	Sania Mirza	Rajiv Gandhi Khel Ratna	Female
1961	Ramanathan Krishnan	Arjuna Award	Male
1962	Naresh Kumar	Arjuna Award	Male
1966	Jaidip Mukerjea	Arjuna Award	Male
1967	Premjit Lall	Arjuna Award	Male
1974	Vijay Amritraj	Arjuna Award	Male
1978–1979	Nirupama Mankad	Arjuna Award	Female
1980–1981	Ramesh Krishnan	Arjuna Award	Male
1985	Anand Amritraj	Arjuna Award	Male
1990	Leander Paes	Arjuna Award	Male
1995	Mahesh Bhupathi	Arjuna Award	Male
1996	Gaurav Natekar	Arjuna Award	Male
1997	Asif Ismail	Arjuna Award	Male
2000	Akhtar Ali ^{+}	Arjuna Award	Male
2001	Sandeep Kirtane	Arjuna Award	Male
2004	Sania Mirza	Arjuna Award	Female
2011	Somdev Devvarman	Arjuna Award	Male
2017	Saketh Myneni	Arjuna Award	Male
2018	Rohan Bopanna	Arjuna Award	Male
2020	Divij Sharan	Arjuna Award	Male
2021	Ankita Raina	Arjuna Award	Female
2014	Zeeshan Ali	Dhyan Chand Award	Male
2015	Shiv Prakash Mishra	Dhyan Chand Award	Male
2019	Nitin Kirtane	Dhyan Chand Award	Male
2020	Nandan P. Bal	Dhyan Chand Award	Male
2020	Naresh Kumar ^{+}	Dronacharya Award	Male

Key
+ Indicates a Lifetime contribution honour

== See also ==
- Tennis Premier League
- India at the Hopman Cup
- Sport in India
