= 2024 Città di Grado Tennis Cup – Doubles =

Doubles
- 2024 Città di Grado Tennis Cup

Final
- Champions: (United States) Jessie Aney (Germany) Lena Papadakis
- Runners-up: (Spain) Yvonne Cavallé Reimers (Italy) Aurora Zantedeschi
- Score: 6–4, 7–5

Events
Singles	Doubles
← 2023 ·	Città di Grado Tennis Cup	· 2025 →

Emily Appleton and Julia Lohoff were the defending champions but Lohoff chose not to participate. Appleton partnered alongside Amina Anshba, but lost in the semifinals to Jessie Aney and Lena Papadakis.

Aney and Papadakis won the title, defeating Yvonne Cavallé Reimers and Aurora Zantedeschi in the final, 6–4, 7–5.

== Seeds ==
1. Amina Anshba / (United Kingdom) Emily Appleton (semifinals)
2. (United Kingdom) Alicia Barnett / (United Kingdom) Freya Christie (quarterfinals)
3. (Switzerland) Conny Perrin / (United Kingdom) Eden Silva (first round)
4. (United States) Jessie Aney / (Germany) Lena Papadakis (champions)

== Draw ==
=== Key ===
- Q = Qualifier
- WC = Wild card
- LL = Lucky loser
- Alt = Alternate
- SE = Special exempt
- PR = Protected ranking
- ITF = ITF entry
- JE = Junior exempt
- w/o = Walkover
- r = Retired
- d = Defaulted
- SR = Special ranking

First round
1	A Anshba (United Kingdom) E Appleton	6	6
(China) M Liu (United States) N Ugrelidze	3	0
(Spain) L Cortez Llorca (India) V Shinde	4	6^{6}
(Ukraine) V Podrez (Ukraine) A Soboleva	6	7^{8}
4	(United States) J Aney (Germany) L Papadakis	6	6
WC	(Italy) M Delai (Italy) F Urgesi	0	1
(Italy) A Abbagnato (Italy) D Chiesa	6^{2}	6	[10]
WC	(Italy) E Alvisi (Italy) B Ricci	7^{7}	4	[6]
(Italy) N Fossa Huergo (Bosnia and Herzegovina) A Wagner	6	6
WC	(Italy) S Parente (Italy) A Piccinini	2	0
(Spain) Y Cavallé Reimers (Italy) A Zantedeschi	6	4	[12]
3	(Switzerland) C Perrin (United Kingdom) E Silva	2	6	[10]
(United Kingdom) A Collins (Colombia) MP Pérez	7	6
A Ibragimova; E Pridankina	5	4
(Australia) K McPhee (Greece) S Sakellaridi	5	5
2	(United Kingdom) A Barnett (United Kingdom) F Christie	7	7

Quarterfinals
1	A Anshba (United Kingdom) E Appleton	6	6
(Ukraine) V Podrez (Ukraine) A Soboleva	4	4
4	(United States) J Aney (Germany) L Papadakis	6	7^{7}
(Italy) A Abbagnato (Italy) D Chiesa	2	6^{4}
(Italy) N Fossa Huergo (Bosnia and Herzegovina) A Wagner	6	6^{3}	[9]
(Spain) Y Cavallé Reimers (Italy) A Zantedeschi	2	7^{7}	[11]
(United Kingdom) A Collins (Colombia) MP Pérez	6	2	[12]
2	(United Kingdom) A Barnett (United Kingdom) F Christie	1	6	[10]

Semifinals
1	A Anshba (United Kingdom) E Appleton	6^{4}	6	[8]
4	(United States) J Aney (Germany) L Papadakis	7^{7}	1	[10]
(Spain) Y Cavallé Reimers (Italy) A Zantedeschi	4	6	[10]
(United Kingdom) A Collins (Colombia) MP Pérez	6	4	[7]

Final
4	(United States) J Aney (Germany) L Papadakis	6	7
(Spain) Y Cavallé Reimers (Italy) A Zantedeschi	4	5
