= 2024 Città di Grado Tennis Cup =

Tennis tournament

- Date: 20–26 May 2023
- Edition: 27th
- Category: ITF Women's World Tennis Tour
- Prize money: $100,000
- Surface: Clay / Outdoor
- Location: Grado, Italy

Champions

Singles
- (United Kingdom) Francesca Jones

Doubles
- (United States) Jessie Aney / (Germany) Lena Papadakis
← 2023 ·	Città di Grado Tennis Cup	· 2025 →

The 2024 Città di Grado Tennis Cup was a professional tennis tournament play on outdoor clay courts. It was the twenty-seventh edition of the tournament, which was part of the 2024 ITF Women's World Tennis Tour. It took place in Grado, Italy, between 20 and 26 May 2024.

== Champions ==
=== Singles ===
- (United Kingdom) Francesca Jones def. (Liechtenstein) Kathinka von Deichmann, 6–1, 7–5

=== Doubles ===
- (United States) Jessie Aney / (Germany) Lena Papadakis def. (Spain) Yvonne Cavallé Reimers / (Italy) Aurora Zantedeschi, 6–4, 7–5

== Singles main draw entrants ==
=== Seeds ===
Country	Player	Rank	Seed
USA	Louisa Chirico	222	1
LIE	Kathinka von Deichmann	253	2
GRE	Sapfo Sakellaridi	254	3
UKR	Anastasiya Soboleva	260	4
~~GBR~~	~~Amarni Banks~~	~~264~~	~~5~~
NED	Lesley Pattinama Kerkhove	281	6
	Elena Pridankina	283	7
GBR	Francesca Jones	298	8

- Rankings are as of 6 May 2024.

=== Other entrants ===
The following players received wildcards into the singles main draw:

- (Italy) Eleonora Alvisi
- (Italy) Beatrice Ricci
- (Italy) Federica Urgesi
- (Italy) Arianna Zucchini

The following player received entry into the singles main draw using a special ranking:

- (United Kingdom) Francesca Jones

The following players received entry from the qualifying draw:

- Amina Anshba
- (Turkey) Çağla Büyükakçay
- (Brazil) Gabriela Cé
- (Italy) Deborah Chiesa
- (Italy) Nicole Fossa Huergo
- (Italy) Alessandra Mazzola
- (Ukraine) Veronika Podrez
- (France) Alice Ramé

The following player received entry as a lucky loser:

- (United Kingdom) Eden Silva
