= 2025 ITF Bengaluru Open – Singles =

Singles
- 2025 ITF Bengaluru Open

Final
- Champion: (Germany) Tatjana Maria
- Runner-up: (France) Léolia Jeanjean
- Score: 6–7^{(0–7)}, 6–3, 6–4

Events
Singles	Doubles
← 2024 ·	ITF Bengaluru Open	· 2026 →

Darja Semeņistaja was the defending champion, but lost in the second round to Linda Fruhvirtová.

Tatjana Maria won the title, defeating Léolia Jeanjean in the final, 6–7^{(0–7)}, 6–3, 6–4.

== Seeds ==
1. (Germany) Tatjana Maria (champion)
2. (Canada) Rebecca Marino (quarterfinals)
3. (Latvia) Darja Semeņistaja (second round)
4. Maria Timofeeva (second round)
5. (Philippines) Alexandra Eala (second round)
6. (Thailand) Mananchaya Sawangkaew (first round)
7. (France) Léolia Jeanjean (final)
8. (Czech Republic) Sára Bejlek (semifinals)

== Draw ==
Key

- Q = Qualifier
- WC = Wild card
- LL = Lucky loser
- Alt = Alternate
- ITF = ITF entry
- PR = Protected ranking
- SR = Special ranking
- SE = Special exempt
- JE = Junior exempt
- JR = Junior Accelerator Programme entrant
- CO = College Accelerator Programme entrant
- NG = Next Gen Accelerator Program entrant
- w/o = Walkover
- r = Retired
- d = Defaulted

=== Finals ===
Semifinals
1	(Germany) Tatjana Maria	6	1	6
(Czech Republic) Linda Fruhvirtová	2	6	4
8	(Czech Republic) Sára Bejlek	5	7	3
7	(France) Léolia Jeanjean	7	5	6

Final
1	(Germany) Tatjana Maria	6^{0}	6	6
7	(France) Léolia Jeanjean	7^{7}	3	4

=== Top half ===
First round
1	(Germany) T Maria	6	7
Q	(Croatia) P Marčinko	4	5
WC	(India) A Raina	7^{7}	7^{7}
Q	D Kudashova	6^{2}	6^{4}
Q	(Indonesia) PM Nugroho	6	5	3
Q	I Shymanovich	4	7	6
(Thailand) L Tararudee	6	6
6	(Thailand) M Sawangkaew	4	0
3	(Latvia) D Semeņistaja	6	6
WC	(India) V Chaudhari	2	2
(Czech Republic) L Fruhvirtová	6	7^{7}
(Brazil) L Pigossi	2	6^{5}
Q	(Slovenia) D Jakupović	7^{7}	3	6
E Pridankina	6^{4}	6	3
(Netherlands) A Hartono	2	1
5	(Philippines) A Eala	6	6

Second round
1	(Germany) T Maria	6	6
WC	(India) A Raina	1	3
Q	I Shymanovich	0	0^{r}
(Thailand) L Tararudee	6	0
3	(Latvia) D Semeņistaja	6	2	3
(Czech Republic) L Fruhvirtová	3	6	6
Q	(Slovenia) D Jakupović	6	6
5	(Philippines) A Eala	4	4

Quarterfinals
1	(Germany) T Maria	6	6
(Thailand) L Tararudee	2	2
(Czech Republic) L Fruhvirtová	5	6	6
Q	(Slovenia) D Jakupović	7	2	2

Semifinals
1	(Germany) T Maria	6	1	6
(Czech Republic) L Fruhvirtová	2	6	4

=== Bottom half ===
First round
8	(Czech Republic) S Bejlek	6	6
WC	(India) S Bhamidipaty	0	0
(Switzerland) S Waltert	1	6	4
(Liechtenstein) K von Deichmann	6	3	6
WC	(India) S Yamalapalli	6	3	6
(United Kingdom) L Miyazaki	3	6	0
(Czech Republic) B Fruhvirtová	3^{r}
4	M Timofeeva	4
7	(France) L Jeanjean	6	7^{7}
Q	(Australia) TN Smith	3	6^{3}
(Hungary) P Udvardy	1	7^{7}	6
(Japan) M Hontama	6	6^{5}	3
Q	M Kozyreva	2	6	6
Q	(Indonesia) J Tjen	6	1	4
LL	(India) R Bhatia	1	0
2	(Canada) R Marino	6	6

Second round
8	(Czech Republic) S Bejlek	6	4	6
(Liechtenstein) K von Deichmann	4	6	3
WC	(India) S Yamalapalli	6	3	6
4	M Timofeeva	1	6	1
7	(France) L Jeanjean	6	6
(Hungary) P Udvardy	4	4
Q	M Kozyreva	2	5
2	(Canada) R Marino	6	7

Quarterfinals
8	(Czech Republic) S Bejlek	6	6
WC	(India) S Yamalapalli	4	4
7	(France) L Jeanjean	3	7	7
2	(Canada) R Marino	6	5	5

Semifinals
8	(Czech Republic) S Bejlek	5	7	3
7	(France) L Jeanjean	7	5	6
