= 2025 Città di Grado Tennis Cup – Singles =

Singles
- 2025 Città di Grado Tennis Cup

Final
- Champion: (Czech Republic) Tereza Valentová
- Runner-up: (Czech Republic) Barbora Palicová
- Score: 6–2, 4–6, 6–1

Events
| Singles | Doubles |
| ← 2024 · | Città di Grado Tennis Cup | · 2026 → |

Tereza Valentová won the singles title at the 2025 Città di Grado Tennis Cup, defeating Barbora Palicová in the final, 6–2, 4–6, 6–1.

Francesca Jones was the reigning champion, but chose to compete at Queen's Club instead.

== Seeds ==
1. (Mexico) Renata Zarazúa (second round)
2. (United States) Taylor Townsend (first round, retired)
3. (France) Chloé Paquet (first round)
4. (Hungary) Panna Udvardy (first round)
5. (Croatia) Jana Fett (second round, retired)
6. (Australia) Astra Sharma (second round)
7. (Austria) Sinja Kraus (quarterfinals)
8. (Austria) Julia Grabher (quarterfinals)

== Draw ==
Key

- Q = Qualifier
- WC = Wild card
- LL = Lucky loser
- Alt = Alternate
- ITF = ITF entry
- PR = Protected ranking
- SR = Special ranking
- SE = Special exempt
- JE = Junior exempt
- JR = Junior Accelerator Programme entrant
- CO = College Accelerator Programme entrant
- NG = Next Gen Accelerator Program entrant
- w/o = Walkover
- r = Retired
- d = Defaulted

=== Finals ===
Semifinals
(Czech Republic) Tereza Valentová | 6 | 6
(Croatia) Petra Marčinko | 2 | 1
(Czech Republic) Dominika Šalková | 2 | 4
(Czech Republic) Barbora Palicová | 6 | 6

Final
(Czech Republic) Tereza Valentová | 6 | 4 | 6
(Czech Republic) Barbora Palicová | 2 | 6 | 1

=== Top half ===
First round
1 | (Mexico) R Zarazúa | 6 | 2 | 7
(Switzerland) S Bandecchi | 2 | 6 | 5
(France) S Janicijevic | 1 | 1
(Czech Republic) T Valentová | 6 | 6
(Slovenia) V Erjavec | 6 | 3 | 6
(Romania) A Bogdan | 0 | 6 | 3
(Germany) N Noha Akugue | 4 | 3
6 | (Australia) A Sharma | 6 | 6
4 | (Hungary) P Udvardy | 4 | 7 | 3
(Croatia) P Marčinko | 6 | 5 | 6
T Prozorova | 2 | 6 | 6
(Italy) G Pedone | 6 | 4 | 4
(Liechtenstein) K von Deichmann | 0 | 3
WC | (Italy) TC Grant | 6 | 6
WC | (Italy) T Pieri | 3 | 6 | 3
5 | (Croatia) J Fett | 6 | 2 | 6

Second round
1 | (Mexico) R Zarazúa | 2 | 7^{7} | 2
(Czech Republic) T Valentová | 6 | 6^{4} | 6
(Slovenia) V Erjavec | 6 | 6
6 | (Australia) A Sharma | 2 | 2
(Croatia) P Marčinko | 3 | 7 | 6
T Prozorova | 6 | 5 | 2
WC | (Italy) TC Grant | 7 | 0
5 | (Croatia) J Fett | 5 | 0^{r}

Quarterfinals
(Czech Republic) T Valentová | 6 | 6
(Slovenia) V Erjavec | 1 | 0
(Croatia) P Marčinko | 6 | 6
WC | (Italy) TC Grant | 3 | 2

Semifinals
(Czech Republic) T Valentová | 6 | 6
(Croatia) P Marčinko | 2 | 1

=== Bottom half ===
First round
7 | (Austria) S Kraus | 7^{7} | 6
Q | (Italy) A Mazzola | 6^{3} | 1
(Australia) T Preston | 1 | 4
WC | (Italy) D Spiteri | 6 | 6
(Czech Republic) D Šalková | 6 | 6
(Italy) N Brancaccio | 3 | 4
Q | (Ukraine) O Oliynykova | 3 | 6 | 7^{7}
3 | (France) C Paquet | 6 | 3 | 6^{5}
8 | (Austria) J Grabher | 6 | 6
Q | (Greece) D Papamichail | 3 | 1
(Romania) M Bulgaru | 7 | 0 | 2
WC | (Italy) F Urgesi | 5 | 6 | 6
(Czech Republic) B Palicová | 6 | 6^{3} | 6
(France) T Andrianjafitrimo | 4 | 7^{7} | 3
Q | (Slovenia) K Juvan | 2 | 3
2 | (United States) T Townsend | 6 | 3^{r}

Second round
7 | (Austria) S Kraus | 7 | 6
WC | (Italy) D Spiteri | 5 | 0
(Czech Republic) D Šalková | 7 | 3 | 6
Q | (Ukraine) O Oliynykova | 5 | 6 | 3
8 | (Austria) J Grabher | 7 | 0
WC | (Italy) F Urgesi | 5 | 0^{r}
(Czech Republic) B Palicová | 6 | 2 | 6
Q | (Slovenia) K Juvan | 4 | 6 | 2

Quarterfinals
7 | (Austria) S Kraus | 3 | 1
(Czech Republic) D Šalková | 6 | 6
8 | (Austria) J Grabher | 2 | 3
(Czech Republic) B Palicová | 6 | 6

Semifinals
(Czech Republic) D Šalková | 2 | 4
(Czech Republic) B Palicová | 6 | 6

== Qualifying ==
=== Seeds ===
The top three seeds received a bye into the qualifying competition.

1. (Ukraine) Oleksandra Oliynykova (qualified)
2. (Burundi) Sada Nahimana (qualifying competition)
3. (Greece) Despina Papamichail (qualified)
4. Maria Timofeeva (qualifying competition)
5. (Croatia) Tara Würth (first round)
6. (Netherlands) Eva Vedder (qualifying competition)
7. (Ukraine) Katarina Zavatska (first round)
8. (Japan) Mei Yamaguchi (qualifying competition)

=== Qualifiers ===
1. (Ukraine) Oleksandra Oliynykova
2. (Italy) Alessandra Mazzola
3. (Greece) Despina Papamichail
4. (Slovenia) Kaja Juvan

=== Qualifying draw ===
==== First qualifier ====
| First round | | | | Qualifying competition |
| | | | | 1 | (Ukraine) Oleksandra Oliynykova | 6 | 2 | 7 |
| | | | | 6 | (Netherlands) Eva Vedder | 2 | 6 | 5 |
| WC | (Italy) Aurora Piccinini | 0 | 0 | 6 | (Netherlands) Eva Vedder | 2 | 6 | 5 |
| 6 | (Netherlands) Eva Vedder | 6 | 6 |

==== Second qualifier ====
| First round | | | | | Qualifying competition |
| | | | | | 2 | (Burundi) Sada Nahimana | 4 | 0 |
| | | | | | | (Italy) Alessandra Mazzola | 6 | 6 |
| | (Italy) Alessandra Mazzola | 2 | 7 | 6 | | (Italy) Alessandra Mazzola | 6 | 6 |
| 7 | (Ukraine) Katarina Zavatska | 6 | 5 | 2 |

==== Third qualifier ====
| First round | | | | Qualifying competition |
| | | | | 3 | (Greece) Despina Papamichail | 7 | 7^{7} |
| | | | | 8 | (Japan) Mei Yamaguchi | 5 | 6^{4} |
| | (Romania) Georgia Crăciun | 0 | 4 | 8 | (Japan) Mei Yamaguchi | 5 | 6^{4} |
| 8 | (Japan) Mei Yamaguchi | 6 | 6 |

==== Fourth qualifier ====
First round
4 | Maria Timofeeva | 6 | 6
Ekaterina Ovcharenko | 0 | 4
(Slovenia) Kaja Juvan | 6 | 6
5 | (Croatia) Tara Würth | 0 | 3

Qualifying competition
4 | Maria Timofeeva | 2 | 1
(Slovenia) Kaja Juvan | 6 | 6
