= 2023 Città di Grado Tennis Cup – Singles =

Singles
- 2023 Città di Grado Tennis Cup

Final
- Champion: Yuliya Hatouka
- Runner-up: (Czech Republic) Lucie Havlíčková
- Score: 2–6, 6–3, 6–1

Events
Singles	Doubles
← 2022 ·	Città di Grado Tennis Cup	· 2024 →

Elisabetta Cocciaretto was the defending champion but chose not to participate.

Yuliya Hatouka won the title, defeating Lucie Havlíčková in the final, 2–6, 6–3, 6–1.

== Seeds ==
1. (Croatia) Tena Lukas (first round, retired)
2. (United States) Hailey Baptiste (quarterfinals)
3. (Turkey) Zeynep Sönmez (quarterfinals)
4. (United States) Asia Muhammad (quarterfinals)
5. (Spain) Irene Burillo Escorihuela (semifinals)
6. (Czech Republic) Lucie Havlíčková (final)
7. (Italy) Camilla Rosatello (semifinals)
8. Yuliya Hatouka (champion)

== Draw ==
=== Key ===
- Q = Qualifier
- WC = Wild card
- LL = Lucky loser
- Alt = Alternate
- SE = Special exempt
- PR = Protected ranking
- ITF = ITF entry
- JE = Junior exempt
- w/o = Walkover
- r = Retired
- d = Defaulted
- SR = Special ranking

=== Finals ===
Semifinals
5	(Spain) Irene Burillo Escorihuela	1	3
8	Yuliya Hatouka	6	6
7	(Italy) Camilla Rosatello	2	4
6/WC	(Czech Republic) Lucie Havlíčková	6	6

Final
8	Yuliya Hatouka	2	6	6
6/WC	(Czech Republic) Lucie Havlíčková	6	3	1

=== Top half ===
First round
1	(Croatia) T Lukas	0	0^{r}
A Korneeva	6	4
S Lansere	6	6
Q	(Romania) M Toma	2	1
Q	(Poland) M Podlińska	6	4	6
WC	(Italy) A Abbagnato	2	6	1
WC	(Italy) A Zantedeschi	2	4
5	(Spain) I Burillo Escorihuela	6	6
4	(United States) A Muhammad	6	6
(Italy) A Turati	4	2
WC	(Italy) G Pedone	6	6
Q	(Romania) O Gavrilă	3	3
(Norway) M Helgø	6	7
Q	(Italy) C Girelli	4	5
Q	(United States) C Rosca	2	2
8	Y Hatouka	6	6

Second round
A Korneeva	4	7^{7}	6
S Lansere	6	6^{3}	0
Q	(Poland) M Podlińska	0	2
5	(Spain) I Burillo Escorihuela	6	6
4	(United States) A Muhammad	6	7
WC	(Italy) G Pedone	2	5
(Norway) M Helgø	2	2
8	Y Hatouka	6	6

Quarterfinals
A Korneeva	3	6	3
5	(Spain) I Burillo Escorihuela	6	2	6
4	(United States) A Muhammad	7^{7}	4	1
8	Y Hatouka	6^{3}	6	6

Semifinals
5	(Spain) I Burillo Escorihuela	1	3
8	Y Hatouka	6	6

=== Bottom half ===
First round
7	(Italy) C Rosatello	6	6
(Greece) S Sakellaridi	3	3
Q	(Italy) M Caregaro	6	3	7
(South Africa) I Kruger	3	6	5
(Spain) A Lázaro García	6	6
(Colombia) M Herazo González	3	4
(United States) W Osuigwe	1	3
3	(Turkey) Z Sönmez	6	6
6/WC	(Czech Republic) L Havlíčková	6	6
Q	(Slovakia) S Milatová	2	4
(Brazil) G Cé	7^{7}	6
(Italy) A Moratelli	6^{3}	3
(Czech Republic) A Sisková	0	1
(Belgium) S Costoulas	6	6
Q	(United States) Q Gleason	1	7	2
2	(United States) H Baptiste	6	5	6

Second round
7	(Italy) C Rosatello	6^{1}	6	4
Q	(Italy) M Caregaro	7^{7}	0	0^{r}
(Spain) A Lázaro García	6	4	2
3	(Turkey) Z Sönmez	3	6	6
6/WC	(Czech Republic) L Havlíčková	6	6
(Brazil) G Cé	2	1
(Belgium) S Costoulas	3	2
2	(United States) H Baptiste	6	6

Quarterfinals
7	(Italy) C Rosatello	6	6
3	(Turkey) Z Sönmez	3	3
6/WC	(Czech Republic) L Havlíčková	6	4	6
2	(United States) H Baptiste	1	6	3

Semifinals
7	(Italy) C Rosatello	2	4
6/WC	(Czech Republic) L Havlíčková	6	6
