= 2026 Chennai Open – Doubles =

Doubles
- 2026 Chennai Open

Final
- Champions: (Switzerland) Naïma Karamoko (Switzerland) Simona Waltert
- Runners-up: (India) Vaishnavi Adkar (India) Rutuja Bhosale
- Score: 6–2, 6–0
- Date: 8 November 2026

Details
- Draw: 16
- Seeds: 4

Events
Singles	Doubles
- WTA Indian Open

Naïma Karamoko and Simona Waltert defeated Vaishnavi Adkar and Rutuja Bhosale in the final, 6–2, 6–0 to win the doubles tennis title at the 2026 Chennai Open. It was the first WTA Tour title for Karamoko and second for Waltert.

Adkar and Bhosale were the first all-Indian team to reach a WTA Tour doubles final.

Aldila Sutjiadi and Janice Tjen were the reigning champions, but did not participate this year.

== Seeds ==
1. (Japan) Momoko Kobori / (Thailand) Peangtarn Plipuech (quarterfinals)
2. (Poland) Weronika Falkowska / (United States) Alana Smith (semifinals)
3. (Czech Republic) Aneta Kučmová / (Czech Republic) Aneta Laboutková (first round)
4. (United Kingdom) Madeleine Brooks / (United Kingdom) Amelia Rajecki (first round)

== Draw ==
Key

- Q = Qualifier
- WC = Wild card
- LL = Lucky loser
- Alt = Alternate
- ITF = ITF entry
- PR = Protected ranking
- SR = Special ranking
- SE = Special exempt
- JE = Junior exempt
- JR = Junior Accelerator Programme entrant
- CO = College Accelerator Programme entrant
- NG = Next Gen Accelerator Program entrant
- w/o = Walkover
- r = Retired
- d = Defaulted

=== Draw ===
First round
1	(Japan) M Kobori (Thailand) P Plipuech	6	6
(United Kingdom) F Christie (United Kingdom) E Silva	1	4
(Switzerland) N Karamoko (Switzerland) S Waltert	6	6
WC	(India) DR Ramesh (India) D Vinayagamurthy	2	2
3	(Czech Republic) A Kučmová (Czech Republic) A Laboutková	3	2
WC	(India) S Bhamidipaty (India) M Rajeshwaran Revathi	6	6
(Netherlands) I Haverlag (Hungary) P Udvardy	6	6
(Japan) M Ayukawa (United Kingdom) E Webley-Smith	3	4
(United Kingdom) J Burrage (United States) R Montgomery	6	6
Alt	A Falei; P Iatcenko	3	2
(India) V Adkar (India) R Bhosale	6	6
4	(United Kingdom) M Brooks (United Kingdom) A Rajecki	4	4
(Australia) G Da Silva-Fick (Kazakhstan) Z Kulambayeva	6	6
(Japan) H Kuwata (India) A Raina	1	1
(Japan) M Hontama (Japan) M Uchijima	6	4	[1]
2	(Poland) W Falkowska (United States) A Smith	2	6	[10]

Quarterfinals
1	(Japan) M Kobori (Thailand) P Plipuech	4	6^{5}
(Switzerland) N Karamoko (Switzerland) S Waltert	6	7^{7}
WC	(India) S Bhamidipaty (India) M Rajeshwaran Revathi	3	4
(Netherlands) I Haverlag (Hungary) P Udvardy	6	6
(United Kingdom) J Burrage (United States) R Montgomery	5	4
(India) V Adkar (India) R Bhosale	7	6
(Australia) G Da Silva-Fick (Kazakhstan) Z Kulambayeva	6	5	[5]
2	(Poland) W Falkowska (United States) A Smith	3	7	[10]

Semifinals
(Switzerland) N Karamoko (Switzerland) S Waltert	6	6
(Netherlands) I Haverlag (Hungary) P Udvardy	4	4
(India) V Adkar (India) R Bhosale	6	2	[10]
2	(Poland) W Falkowska (United States) A Smith	2	6	[8]

Final
(Switzerland) N Karamoko (Switzerland) S Waltert	6	6
(India) V Adkar (India) R Bhosale	2	0
