= 2022 Città di Grado Tennis Cup =

Tennis tournament

- Date: 23–29 May 2022
- Edition: 25th
- Category: ITF Women's World Tennis Tour
- Prize money: $60,000
- Surface: Clay / Outdoor
- Location: Grado, Italy

Champions

Singles
- (Italy) Elisabetta Cocciaretto

Doubles
- Alena Fomina-Klotz / (Slovenia) Dalila Jakupović
← 2021 ·	Città di Grado Tennis Cup	· 2023 →

The 2022 Città di Grado Tennis Cup was a professional tennis tournament played on outdoor clay courts. It was the twenty-fifth edition of the tournament which was part of the 2022 ITF Women's World Tennis Tour. It took place in Grado, Italy between 23 and 29 May 2022.

== Singles main draw entrants ==
=== Seeds ===
Country	Player	Rank^{1}	Seed
SUI	Ylena In-Albon	119	1
UKR	Kateryna Baindl	146	2
ITA	Lucrezia Stefanini	157	3
ITA	Elisabetta Cocciaretto	159	4
ITA	Sara Errani	160	5
	Anastasia Tikhonova	177	6
SUI	Stefanie Vögele	178	7
SUI	Simona Waltert	212	8

- ^{1} Rankings are as of 16 May 2022.

=== Other entrants ===
The following players received wildcards into the singles main draw:

- (Italy) Nuria Brancaccio
- (Italy) Deborah Chiesa
- (Italy) Sara Errani
- (Italy) Angelica Raggi

The following players received entry from the qualifying draw:

- (Hong Kong) Eudice Chong
- (Slovenia) Dalila Jakupović
- (Italy) Lisa Pigato
- (Greece) Sapfo Sakellaridi
- (Romania) Oana Georgeta Simion
- (Switzerland) Lulu Sun
- (Italy) Anna Turati
- (Croatia) Tara Würth

== Champions ==
=== Singles ===
- (Italy) Elisabetta Cocciaretto def. (Switzerland) Ylena In-Albon, 6–2, 6–2

=== Doubles ===
- Alena Fomina-Klotz / (Slovenia) Dalila Jakupović def. (Hong Kong) Eudice Chong / (Chinese Taipei) Liang En-shuo, 6–1, 6–4
