= 2022 Città di Grado Tennis Cup – Singles =

Singles
- 2022 Città di Grado Tennis Cup

Final
- Champion: (Italy) Elisabetta Cocciaretto
- Runner-up: (Switzerland) Ylena In-Albon
- Score: 6–2, 6–2

Events
Singles	Doubles
← 2021 ·	Città di Grado Tennis Cup	· 2023 →

Nuria Párrizas Díaz was the defending champion but chose to participate at the 2022 French Open instead.

Elisabetta Cocciaretto won the title, defeating Ylena In-Albon in the final, 6–2, 6–2.

== Seeds ==
1. (Switzerland) Ylena In-Albon (final)
2. (Ukraine) Kateryna Baindl (first round)
3. (Italy) Lucrezia Stefanini (first round)
4. (Italy) Elisabetta Cocciaretto (champion)
5. (Italy) Sara Errani (semifinals)
6. Anastasia Tikhonova (quarterfinals)
7. (Switzerland) Stefanie Vögele (first round)
8. (Switzerland) Simona Waltert (quarterfinals)

== Draw ==
=== Key ===
- Q = Qualifier
- WC = Wild card
- LL = Lucky loser
- Alt = Alternate
- SE = Special exempt
- PR = Protected ranking
- ITF = ITF entry
- JE = Junior exempt
- w/o = Walkover
- r = Retired
- d = Defaulted
- SR = Special ranking

=== Finals ===
Semifinals
1	(Switzerland) Ylena In-Albon	6	7
5/WC	(Italy) Sara Errani	4	5
4	(Italy) Elisabetta Cocciaretto	7	6
Q	(Slovenia) Dalila Jakupović	5	2

Final
1	(Switzerland) Ylena In-Albon	2	2
4	(Italy) Elisabetta Cocciaretto	6	6

=== Top half ===
First round
1	(Switzerland) Y In-Albon	6	6
(Germany) K Gerlach	1	2
(Italy) M Di Giuseppe	3	0^{r}
Q	(Croatia) T Würth	6	1
(Chile) D Seguel	6	5	2
(Mexico) M Zacarías	4	7	6
(Latvia) D Vismane	6	0
7	(Switzerland) S Vögele	3	0^{r}
3	(Italy) L Stefanini	6	4	4
Q	(Romania) OG Simion	2	6	6
(Italy) C Ferrando	2	6	4
(Austria) B Haas	6	4	6
(Chile) B Gatica	6	4	6
Q	(Greece) S Sakellaridi	4	6	1
(Italy) F Di Sarra	0	6^{3}
5/WC	(Italy) S Errani	6	7^{7}

Second round
1	(Switzerland) Y In-Albon	5	6	7
Q	(Croatia) T Würth	7	3	5
(Mexico) M Zacarías	6	0	6
(Latvia) D Vismane	4	6	3
Q	(Romania) OG Simion	3	2
(Austria) B Haas	6	6
(Chile) B Gatica	6	1	1
5/WC	(Italy) S Errani	4	6	6

Quarterfinals
1	(Switzerland) Y In-Albon	6	6
(Mexico) M Zacarías	1	1
(Austria) B Haas	5	6	2
5/WC	(Italy) S Errani	7	1	6

Semifinals
1	(Switzerland) Y In-Albon	6	7
5/WC	(Italy) S Errani	4	5

=== Bottom half ===
First round
8	(Switzerland) S Waltert	4	7	6
WC	(Italy) A Raggi	6	5	0
N Vikhlyantseva	4	6	6
(Hungary) T Babos	6	1	2
(Colombia) E Arango	6	3
Q	(Switzerland) L Sun	4	0^{r}
Q	(Italy) A Turati	3	5
4	(Italy) E Cocciaretto	6	7
6	A Tikhonova	0	6	6
WC	(Italy) N Brancaccio	6	4	3
Q	(Italy) L Pigato	6	6
Q	(Hong Kong) E Chong	1	2
Q	(Slovenia) D Jakupović	6	6
(Chinese Taipei) E-s Liang	3	0
WC	(Italy) D Chiesa	7^{7}	6
2	(Ukraine) K Baindl	6^{5}	2

Second round
8	(Switzerland) S Waltert	6	6
N Vikhlyantseva	4	1
(Colombia) E Arango	6	3	3
4	(Italy) E Cocciaretto	3	6	6
6	A Tikhonova	6	3	6
Q	(Italy) L Pigato	3	6	4
Q	(Slovenia) D Jakupović	4	6	6
WC	(Italy) D Chiesa	6	4	0

Quarterfinals
8	(Switzerland) S Waltert	5	3
4	(Italy) E Cocciaretto	7	6
6	A Tikhonova	6	5	2
Q	(Slovenia) D Jakupović	1	7	6

Semifinals
4	(Italy) E Cocciaretto	7	6
Q	(Slovenia) D Jakupović	5	2
