= 2022 Città di Grado Tennis Cup – Doubles =

Doubles
- 2022 Città di Grado Tennis Cup

Final
- Champions: Alena Fomina-Klotz (Slovenia) Dalila Jakupović
- Runners-up: (Hong Kong) Eudice Chong (Chinese Taipei) Liang En-shuo
- Score: 6–1, 6–4

Events
Singles	Doubles
← 2021 ·	Città di Grado Tennis Cup	· 2023 →

Lucia Bronzetti and Isabella Shinikova were the defending champions but chose not to participate.

Alena Fomina-Klotz and Dalila Jakupović won the title, defeating Eudice Chong and Liang En-shuo in the final, 6–1, 6–4.

== Seeds ==
1. (Chile) Bárbara Gatica / (Brazil) Rebeca Pereira (quarterfinals)
2. (Hong Kong) Eudice Chong / (Chinese Taipei) Liang En-shuo (final)
3. (Lithuania) Justina Mikulskytė / (Slovenia) Nika Radišić (quarterfinals)
4. Anastasia Tikhonova / (Latvia) Daniela Vismane (quarterfinals)

== Draw ==
=== Key ===
- Q = Qualifier
- WC = Wild card
- LL = Lucky loser
- Alt = Alternate
- SE = Special exempt
- PR = Protected ranking
- ITF = ITF entry
- JE = Junior exempt
- w/o = Walkover
- r = Retired
- d = Defaulted
- SR = Special ranking

=== Draw ===
First round
A Fomina-Klotz (Slovenia) D Jakupović	6	3	[10]
(Argentina) J Ortenzi; E Reyngold	4	6	[5]
(Ukraine) V Strakhova; N Vikhlyantseva	2	7^{7}	[6]
(Brazil) G Cé (Mexico) M Zacarías	6	6^{4}	[10]
(Ukraine) M Kolb (Ukraine) N Kolb	w/o
(Italy) M Paoletti (Italy) L Pigato
V Koval (Czech Republic) J Marková	5	2
4	A Tikhonova (Latvia) D Vismane	7	6
(Italy) N Brancaccio (Italy) A Zantedeschi	6	6
(Ukraine) M Kostiuk (Italy) M Marcon	4	0

Quarterfinals
1	(Chile) B Gatica (Brazil) R Pereira	5	4
A Fomina-Klotz (Slovenia) D Jakupović	7	6
3	(Lithuania) J Mikulskytė (Slovenia) N Radišić	4	5
(Brazil) G Cé (Mexico) M Zacarías	6	7
(Ukraine) M Kolb (Ukraine) N Kolb	6	6
4	A Tikhonova (Latvia) D Vismane	3	4
(Italy) N Brancaccio (Italy) A Zantedeschi	7	2	[8]
2	(Hong Kong) E Chong (Chinese Taipei) E-s Liang	5	6	[10]

Semifinals
A Fomina-Klotz (Slovenia) D Jakupović	3
(Brazil) G Cé (Mexico) M Zacarías	3^{r}
(Ukraine) M Kolb (Ukraine) N Kolb	1	5
2	(Hong Kong) E Chong (Chinese Taipei) E-s Liang	6	7

Final
A Fomina-Klotz (Slovenia) D Jakupović	6	6
2	(Hong Kong) E Chong (Chinese Taipei) E-s Liang	1	4
