= 2026 Chennai Open – Singles =

Singles
- 2026 Chennai Open

Final
- Champion: (Poland) Magda Linette
- Runner-up: (Indonesia) Janice Tjen
- Score: 5–7, 6–1, 6–4
- Date: 9 November 2026

Details
- Draw: 32 (4Q / 4WC)
- Seeds: 8

Events
Singles	Doubles
- Chennai Open

At the 2026 Chennai Open, Magda Linette defeated defending champion Janice Tjen in the final, 5–7, 6–1, 6–4 to win the women's singles tennis title. The tournament took place on outdoor hard courts in Chennai, India, and was a WTA 250 level event.

Maaya Rajeshwaran Revathi was the first Indian player to reach a WTA Tour singles quarterfinal since Sania Mirza in 2012.

== Seeds ==
1. (Indonesia) Janice Tjen (final)
2. (Austria) Lilli Tagger (withdrew)
3. (Poland) Magda Linette (champion)
4. (Hungary) Panna Udvardy (first round)
5. (Thailand) Mananchaya Sawangkaew (first round)
6. (Uzbekistan) Polina Kudermetova (quarterfinals)
7. Anastasia Zakharova (semifinals)
8. (Poland) Katarzyna Kawa (first round)
9. (United Kingdom) Harriet Dart (withdrew)
10. (Italy) Lucrezia Stefanini (quarterfinals, retired)

== Draw ==
Key

- Q = Qualifier
- WC = Wild card
- LL = Lucky loser
- Alt = Alternate
- ITF = ITF entry
- PR = Protected ranking
- SR = Special ranking
- SE = Special exempt
- JE = Junior exempt
- JR = Junior Accelerator Programme entrant
- CO = College Accelerator Programme entrant
- NG = Next Gen Accelerator Program entrant
- w/o = Walkover
- r = Retired
- d = Defaulted

=== Finals ===
Semifinals
1	(Indonesia) Janice Tjen	6	6
(United States) Robin Montgomery	3	4
3	(Poland) Magda Linette	2	6	6
7	Anastasia Zakharova	6	2	3

Final
1	(Indonesia) Janice Tjen	7	1	4
3	(Poland) Magda Linette	5	6	6

=== Top half ===
First round
1	(Indonesia) J Tjen	6	6
WC	(United States) K Hui	1	2
(Switzerland) J Teichmann	3	4
(Chinese Taipei) J Garland	6	6
(Spain) O Selekhmeteva	6	6
(Serbia) T Kostović	4	3
LL	(Slovakia) V Morvayová	3	6	1
6	(Uzbekistan) P Kudermetova	6	4	6
4	(Hungary) P Udvardy	4	6	1
(United States) R Montgomery	6	1	6
(Belgium) J Vandromme	7	6
Q	(Japan) K Okamura	5	1
(Czech Republic) L Fruhvirtová	6^{3}	4
Q	(Poland) W Falkowska	7^{7}	6
WC	(India) M Rajeshwaran Revathi	6	2	7^{7}
8	(Poland) K Kawa	4	6	6^{5}

Second round
1	(Indonesia) J Tjen	7^{7}	6
(Chinese Taipei) J Garland	6^{1}	1
(Spain) O Selekhmeteva	3	0
6	(Uzbekistan) P Kudermetova	6	6
(United States) R Montgomery	6	3	7
(Belgium) J Vandromme	4	6	5
Q	(Poland) W Falkowska	4	3
WC	(India) M Rajeshwaran Revathi	6	6

Quarterfinals
1	(Indonesia) J Tjen	5	6	6
6	(Uzbekistan) P Kudermetova	7	4	2
(United States) R Montgomery	6	6
WC	(India) M Rajeshwaran Revathi	3	3

Semifinals
1	(Indonesia) J Tjen	6	6
(United States) R Montgomery	3	4

=== Bottom half ===
First round
5	(Thailand) M Sawangkaew	6^{3}	2
(Japan) M Hontama	7^{7}	6
LL	(Japan) M Yamaguchi	4	5
Q	(Kazakhstan) Z Kulambayeva	6	7
(Japan) M Uchijima	6	6
(Slovakia) R Šramková	3	2
Q	A Falei	6^{3}	7	2
3	(Poland) M Linette	7^{7}	5	6
7	A Zakharova	7^{7}	6
P Iatcenko	6^{3}	1
PR	(United Kingdom) J Burrage	6	3	5
WC	(India) V Adkar	3	6	7
WC	(India) S Yamalapalli	4	6	3
(Switzerland) S Waltert	6	3	6
LL	R Zolotareva	2	2
10	(Italy) L Stefanini	6	6

Second round
(Japan) M Hontama	4	6	7
Q	(Kazakhstan) Z Kulambayeva	6	4	5
(Japan) M Uchijima	6^{5}	0
3	(Poland) M Linette	7^{7}	6
7	A Zakharova	6	6
WC	(India) V Adkar	3	0
(Switzerland) S Waltert	2	3
10	(Italy) L Stefanini	6	6

Quarterfinals
(Japan) M Hontama	6	5	4
3	(Poland) M Linette	4	7	6
7	A Zakharova	6	5
10	(Italy) L Stefanini	2	2^{r}

Semifinals
3	(Poland) M Linette	2	6	6
7	A Zakharova	6	2	3

== Qualifying ==
=== Seeds ===
1. Aliona Falei (qualified)
2. (Japan) Kyōka Okamura (qualified)
3. (Japan) Mei Yamaguchi (qualifying competition, lucky loser)
4. (Slovakia) Viktória Morvayová (qualifying competition, lucky loser)
5. (Poland) Weronika Falkowska (qualified)
6. Rada Zolotareva (qualifying competition, lucky loser)
7. (Ukraine) Yelyzaveta Kotliar (first round)
8. (Japan) Momoko Kobori (qualifying competition)

=== Qualifiers ===
1. Aliona Falei
2. (Japan) Kyōka Okamura
3. (Kazakhstan) Zhibek Kulambayeva
4. (Poland) Weronika Falkowska

=== Lucky losers ===
1. (Japan) Mei Yamaguchi
2. (Slovakia) Viktória Morvayová
3. Rada Zolotareva

=== Qualifying draw ===
==== First qualifier ====
First round
1	Aliona Falei	6	6
Ekaterina Yashina	1	4
Mariia Tkacheva	1	1^{r}
6	Rada Zolotareva	6	2

Qualifying competition
1	Aliona Falei	6	4	7
6	Rada Zolotareva	4	6	5

==== Second qualifier ====
First round
2	(Japan) Kyōka Okamura	6	6
WC	(India) Diya Ramesh Ramesh	4	2
(Japan) Rinko Matsuda	4	0
8	(Japan) Momoko Kobori	6	6

Qualifying competition
2	(Japan) Kyōka Okamura	3	6	6
8	(Japan) Momoko Kobori	6	3	3

==== Third qualifier ====
First round
3	(Japan) Mei Yamaguchi	6	6
(India) Zeel Desai	1	0
(Kazakhstan) Zhibek Kulambayeva	6	6
7	(Ukraine) Yelyzaveta Kotliar	2	3

Qualifying competition
3	(Japan) Mei Yamaguchi	6	3	6^{4}
(Kazakhstan) Zhibek Kulambayeva	3	6	7^{7}

==== Fourth qualifier ====
First round
4	(Slovakia) Viktória Morvayová	6	6
(India) Shrivalli Bhamidipaty	2	3
WC	(India) Jensi Dipakbhai Kanabar	2	7	3
5	(Poland) Weronika Falkowska	6	5	6

Qualifying competition
4	(Slovakia) Viktória Morvayová	3	7	4
5	(Poland) Weronika Falkowska	6	5	6
