= 2023 Città di Grado Tennis Cup – Doubles =

Doubles
- 2023 Città di Grado Tennis Cup

Final
- Champions: (United Kingdom) Emily Appleton (Germany) Julia Lohoff
- Runners-up: Sofya Lansere (Czech Republic) Anna Sisková
- Score: 3–6, 6–4, [11–9]

Events
Singles	Doubles
← 2022 ·	Città di Grado Tennis Cup	· 2024 →

Alena Fomina-Klotz and Dalila Jakupović were the defending champions but chose not to participate.

Emily Appleton and Julia Lohoff won the title, defeating Sofya Lansere and Anna Sisková in the final, 3–6, 6–4, [11–9].

== Seeds ==
1. (United Kingdom) Emily Appleton / (Germany) Julia Lohoff (champions)
2. Sofya Lansere / (Czech Republic) Anna Sisková (final)
3. (Italy) Angelica Moratelli / (Italy) Camilla Rosatello (quarterfinals)
4. (United States) Quinn Gleason / (United States) Christina Rosca (semifinals)

== Draw ==
=== Key ===
- Q = Qualifier
- WC = Wild card
- LL = Lucky loser
- Alt = Alternate
- SE = Special exempt
- PR = Protected ranking
- ITF = ITF entry
- JE = Junior exempt
- w/o = Walkover
- r = Retired
- d = Defaulted
- SR = Special ranking

First round
1	(United Kingdom) E Appleton (Germany) J Lohoff	6	6
(Romania) RI Coreisa (Brazil) R Pereira	1	0
(Colombia) M Herazo González (Bosnia and Herzegovina) A Wagner	5	6	[4]
(Italy) A Abbagnato (Italy) M Marcon	7	1	[10]
4	(United States) Q Gleason (United States) C Rosca	6	6
(Slovakia) S Milatová (Poland) M Podlińska	2	1
(Italy) V Ferrara (Italy) G Pedone	6	6
WC	(China) M Liu (Italy) S Parente	2	1
(Romania) O Gavrilă (Greece) S Sakellaridi	6	6
(Italy) C Girelli (Romania) M Toma	3	4
(Spain) I Burillo Escorihuela (Italy) A Zantedeschi	4	3
3	(Italy) A Moratelli (Italy) C Rosatello	6	6
(Belgium) S Costoulas; A Korneeva	6	6
WC	(Italy) C Franzin (Slovenia) M Radišić	3	1
(United States) H Baptiste (United States) W Osuigwe	5	2
2	S Lansere (Czech Republic) A Sisková	7	6

Quarterfinals
1	(United Kingdom) E Appleton (Germany) J Lohoff	6	7^{7}
(Italy) A Abbagnato (Italy) M Marcon	1	6^{2}
4	(United States) Q Gleason (United States) C Rosca	1	6	[12]
(Italy) V Ferrara (Italy) G Pedone	6	1	[10]
(Romania) O Gavrilă (Greece) S Sakellaridi	6	6
3	(Italy) A Moratelli (Italy) C Rosatello	3	4
(Belgium) S Costoulas; A Korneeva	6	0	[8]
2	S Lansere (Czech Republic) A Sisková	4	6	[10]

Semifinals
1	(United Kingdom) E Appleton (Germany) J Lohoff	6	6
4	(United States) Q Gleason (United States) C Rosca	4	4
(Romania) O Gavrilă (Greece) S Sakellaridi	5	6	[4]
2	S Lansere (Czech Republic) A Sisková	7	4	[10]

Final
1	(United Kingdom) E Appleton (Germany) J Lohoff	3	6	[11]
2	S Lansere (Czech Republic) A Sisková	6	4	[9]
