= ITF Bengaluru Open =

- 2026 ITF Bengaluru Open

ITF Women's Tour
- Event name: ITF Bengaluru Open
- Location: Bengaluru, India
- Venue: Karnataka State Lawn Tennis Association
- Category: ITF Women's Circuit
- Surface: Hard
- Draw: 32S/32Q/16D
- Prize money: $100,000

The ITF Bengaluru Open is a tournament for professional female tennis players played on outdoor Hard courts. The event is classified as a $100,000 ITF Women's Circuit tournament and has been held in Bengaluru, India, since 2024.

== Past finals ==
=== Singles ===
Year	Champion	Runner-up	Score
2026	(Belgium) Hanne Vandewinkel	(India) Vaishnavi Adkar	6–0, 6–1
2025	(Germany) Tatjana Maria	(France) Léolia Jeanjean	6–7^{(0–7)}, 6–3, 6–4
2024	(Latvia) Darja Semeņistaja	(France) Carole Monnet	6–1, 3–0 ret.

=== Doubles ===
Year	Champions	Runners-up	Score
2026	(Japan) Misaki Matsuda (Japan) Eri Shimizu	(Indonesia) Priska Nugroho (India) Ankita Raina	6–4, 3–6, [10–5]
2025	(United States) Jessie Aney (United States) Jessica Failla	Amina Anshba; Elena Pridankina	6–2, 4–6, [10–6]
2024	(Italy) Camilla Rosatello (Latvia) Darja Semeņistaja	(Chinese Taipei) Li Yu-yun (Japan) Eri Shimizu	3–6, 6–2, [10–8]
