= Julia Adams =

Julianne, Julie or Julia Adams may refer to:

- Julia Davis Adams (1900–1993), American author
- Julie Adams (1926–2019), American actress
- Julia Adams (sociologist) (born 1957), American sociologist
- Julianne Adams (born 1966), Australian wheelchair basketball player
- Julie Raque Adams (born 1969), American politician in Kentucky
- Julie E. Adams (born 1977), American government official, Senate Secretary
- Julia Adams (tennis) (born 2001), American tennis player
