= 2026 ITF Bengaluru Open =

Tennis tournament

- Date: 16–22 February 2026
- Edition: 3rd
- Category: ITF Women's World Tennis Tour
- Prize money: $100,000
- Surface: Hard / Outdoor
- Location: Bengaluru, India
- Venue: SM Krishna Tennis Stadium

Champions

Singles
- (Belgium) Hanne Vandewinkel

Doubles
- (Japan) Misaki Matsuda / (Japan) Eri Shimizu
- ITF Bengaluru Open

The 2026 ITF Bengaluru Open is a professional tennis tournament played on outdoor hard courts.It is the third edition of the tournament which is part of the 2026 ITF Women's World Tennis Tour. It took place in Bengaluru, India between 16 and 22 February 2026.

== Champions ==
=== Singles ===
- (Belgium) Hanne Vandewinkel def. (India) Vaishnavi Adkar, 6–0, 6–1.

=== Doubles ===
- (Japan) Misaki Matsuda / (Japan) Eri Shimizu def. (Indonesia) Priska Nugroho / (India) Ankita Raina, 6–4, 3–6, [10–5].

== Singles main draw entrants ==
=== Seeds ===
Country	Player	Rank^{1}	Seed
AUS	Talia Gibson	112	1
THA	Lanlana Tararudee	126	2
BEL	Hanne Vandewinkel	135	3
AUS	Taylah Preston	151	4
	Polina Iatcenko	163	5
GBR	Harriet Dart	178	6
	Elena Pridankina	192	7
JPN	Mai Hontama	222	8

- ^{1} Rankings are as of 9 February 2026.

=== Other entrants ===
The following players received wildcards into the singles main draw:

- (India) Vaishnavi Adkar
- (India) Shruti Ahlawat
- (India) Shrivalli Bhamidipaty
- (India) Maaya Rajeshwaran Revathi

The following player received entry into the singles main draw using a special ranking:

- (Chinese Taipei) Lee Ya-hsuan

The following players received entry from the qualifying draw:

- (India) Vaidehi Chaudhari
- (Netherlands) Jasmijn Gimbrère
- (Finland) Anastasia Kulikova
- (Japan) Misaki Matsuda
- (Poland) Zuzanna Pawlikowska
- (Japan) Eri Shimizu
- Kristiana Sidorova
- (Romania) Arina Gabriela Vasilescu

The following player received entry as a lucky loser:

- Victoria Milovanova
