= 2025 Città di Grado Tennis Cup =

Tennis tournament

- Date: 9–15 June 2025
- Edition: 28th
- Category: WTA 125 tournaments
- Prize money: $115,000
- Surface: Clay / Outdoor
- Location: Grado, Italy

Champions

Singles
- (Czech Republic) Tereza Valentová

Doubles
- (United States) Quinn Gleason / (Brazil) Ingrid Martins
← 2024 ·	Città di Grado Tennis Cup	· 2026 →

The 2025 Città di Grado Tennis Cup was a professional tennis tournament played on outdoor clay courts. It was the 28th edition of the tournament, and part of the 2025 WTA 125 tournaments (upgraded from ITF status in previous years). It took place in Grado, Italy, between 9 and 15 June 2025.

== Singles main-draw entrants ==
=== Seeds ===
Country	Player	Rank^{1}	Seed
MEX	Renata Zarazúa	74	1
USA	Taylor Townsend	104	2
FRA	Chloe Paquet	119	3
HUN	Panna Udvardy	141	4
CRO	Jana Fett	143	5
AUS	Astra Sharma	149	6
AUT	Sinja Kraus	158	7
AUT	Julia Grabher	159	8

- ^{1} Rankings are as of 26 May 2025.

=== Other entrants ===
The following players received wildcards into the singles main draw:

- (Italy) Tyra Caterina Grant
- (Italy) Tatiana Pieri
- (Italy) Dalila Spiteri
- (Italy) Federica Urgesi

The following players received entry from the qualifying draw:

- (Slovenia) Kaja Juvan
- (Italy) Alessandra Mazzola
- (Ukraine) Oleksandra Oliynykova
- (Greece) Despina Papamichail

=== Withdrawals ===
- Erika Andreeva → replaced by (Australia) Taylah Preston
- (Poland) Maja Chwalińska → replaced by (Romania) Miriam Bulgaru
- (Ukraine) Anhelina Kalinina → replaced by (Italy) Giorgia Pedone
- (Australia) Daria Saville → replaced by (Croatia) Petra Marčinko

== Doubles entrants ==
=== Seeds ===
Country	Player	Country	Player	Rank^{1}	Seed
USA	Quinn Gleason	BRA	Ingrid Martins	176	1
MEX	Renata Zarazúa	BEL	Kimberley Zimmermann	197	2
CZE	Jesika Malečková	CZE	Miriam Škoch	200	3
FRA	Estelle Cascino	CRO	Tara Würth	316	4

- ^{1} Rankings as of 26 May 2025.

=== Other entrants ===
The following pair received entry as alternates:

- (Italy) Camilla Franzin / (Italy) Cecilia Franzin

=== Withdrawals ===
- (Italy) Tyra Caterina Grant / (United States) Taylor Townsend → replaced by (Italy) Camilla Franzin / (Italy) Cecilia Franzin

== Champions ==
=== Singles ===
- (Czech Republic) Tereza Valentová def. (Czech Republic) Barbora Palicová, 6–2, 4–6, 6–1

=== Doubles ===
- (United States) Quinn Gleason / (Brazil) Ingrid Martins def. (Slovenia) Veronika Erjavec / (Czech Republic) Dominika Šalková, 6–2, 5–7, [10–5]
