= Yuliya Hatouka =

Belarusian tennis player (born 2000)

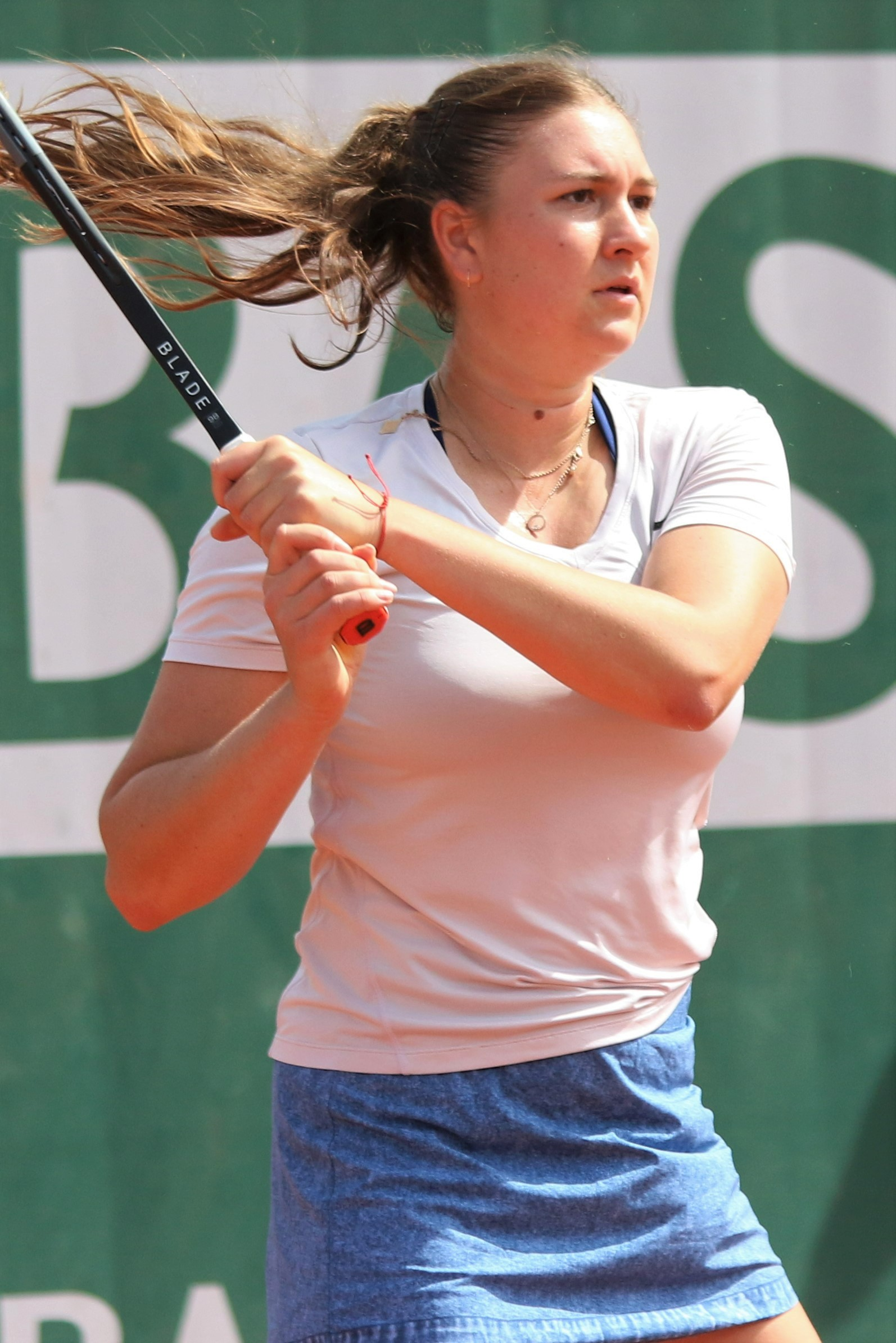
- Hatouka at the 2022 French Open
- Country (sports): Belarus
- Born: 24 April 2000 (age 26)
- Plays: Right (two-handed backhand)
- Prize money: $324,551

Singles
- Career record: 272–160
- Career titles: 14 ITF
- Highest ranking: No. 180 (31 January 2022)
- Current ranking: No. 723 (24 August 2026)

Grand Slam singles results
- Australian Open: Q1 (2022, 2024)
- French Open: Q2 (2022)
- US Open: Q2 (2021)

Doubles
- Career record: 102–84
- Career titles: 10 ITF
- Highest ranking: No. 376 (27 October 2025)
- Current ranking: No. 615 (24 August 2026)
- Last updated on: 25 August 2026.

Yuliya Uladzimiraŭna Hatouka (Belarusian: Юлія Уладзіміраўна Гатоўка; Russian: Юлия Владимировна Готовко, romanized: Yuliya Vladimirovna Gotovko; born 24 April 2000) is a Belarusian professional tennis player.

Hatouka has career-high WTA rankings of 180 in singles, achieved in 2022, and 376 in doubles, attained in 2025. She has won fourteen singles and ten doubles titles on the ITF Women's Circuit.

== Career overview ==
Hatouka made her WTA Tour main-draw debut at the 2021 Internationaux de Strasbourg, where she made it through qualifying, but lost to Maryna Zanevska in the first round.

== Grand Slam singles performance timeline ==
Key
W	F	SF	QF	#R	RR	Q#	DNQ	A	NH

(W) winner; (F) finalist; (SF) semifinalist; (QF) quarterfinalist; (#R) rounds 4, 3, 2, 1; (RR) round-robin stage; (Q#) qualification round; (DNQ) did not qualify; (A) absent; (NH) not held; (SR) strike rate (events won / competed); (W–L) win–loss record.
To avoid confusion and double counting, these charts are updated at the conclusion of a tournament or when the player's participation has ended.

Tournament	2021	2022	W–L
Australian Open	A	Q1	0–0
French Open	A	Q2	0–0
Wimbledon	A	A (Note: Suspended due to politics.)	0–0
US Open	Q2	Q1	0–0
Win–loss	0–0	0–0	0–0

== ITF Circuit finals ==
=== Singles: 28 (15 titles, 13 runner-ups) ===
Legend $60,000 tournaments (1–1) $40,000 tournaments (0–1) $25/35,000 tournaments (5–4) $15,000 tournaments (9–7)	Finals by surface Hard (12–12) Clay (3–1)

Result	W–L	Date	Tournament	Tier	Surface	Opponent	Score
Loss	0–1	Nov 2017	ITF Minsk, Belarus	15k	Hard	(France) Manon Arcangioli	7–6^{(7–2)}, 3–6, 2–6
Win	1–1	Jan 2018	ITF Sharm El Sheikh, Egypt	15k	Hard	(Russia) Anastasia Potapova	6–4, 4–6, 7–5
Loss	1–2	Mar 2018	ITF Sharm El Sheikh, Egypt	15k	Hard	(Turkey) Berfu Cengiz	3–6, 6–4, 3–6
Win	2–2	Jun 2018	ITF Minsk, Belarus	15k	Clay	(Belarus) Vlada Zvereva	4–6, 6–1, 6–0
Win	3–2	Sep 2018	ITF Almaty, Kazakhstan	25k	Clay	(Kazakhstan) Anna Danilina	6–4, 6–7^{(1–7)}, 6–2
Win	4–2	Nov 2018	ITF Minsk, Belarus	25k	Hard	(Cyprus) Raluca Șerban	7–5, 7–5
Loss	4–3	Jan 2020	ITF Monastir, Tunisia	W15	Hard	(Kazakhstan) Gozal Ainitdinova	2–6, 4–6
Win	5–3	Feb 2020	ITF Monastir, Tunisia	W15	Hard	(Czech Republic) Jesika Malečková	6–1, 6–2
Win	6–3	Sep 2020	ITF Monastir, Tunisia	W15	Hard	(Belarus) Shalimar Talbi	6–3, 6–2
Loss	6–4	Nov 2020	ITF Monastir, Tunisia	W15	Hard	(France) Carole Monnet	6–2, 1–6, 5–7
Win	7–4	Dec 2020	ITF Monastir, Tunisia	W15	Hard	(Czech Republic) Linda Fruhvirtová	6–1, 5–7, 6–3
Loss	7–5	Dec 2020	ITF Monastir, Tunisia	W15	Hard	(France) Carole Monnet	7–5, 5–7, 3–6
Win	8–5	Feb 2021	ITF Shymkent, Kazakhstan	W15	Hard	(Russia) Anastasia Tikhonova	7–5, 6–2
Loss	8–6	Feb 2021	ITF Shymkent, Kazakhstan	W15	Hard	(Russia) Anastasia Tikhonova	5–7, 6–2, 6–7^{(2–7)}
Loss	8–7	Feb 2021	ITF Moscow, Russia	W25	Hard	(Poland) Urszula Radwańska	6–4, 3–6, 4–6
Win	9–7	Mar 2021	ITF Kazan, Russia	W25	Hard	(Poland) Urszula Radwańska	7–6^{(8–6)}, 4–6, 6–4
Loss	9–8	Apr 2021	ITF Dubai, UAE	W25	Hard	(United Kingdom) Jodie Burrage	4–6, 3–6
Win	10–8	Oct 2021	ITF Karaganda, Kazakhstan	W25	Hard (i)	(Russia) Ekaterina Kazionova	7–5, 6–0
Loss	10–9	Nov 2022	ITF Sharm El Sheikh, Egypt	W25	Hard	(Netherlands) Arantxa Rus	2–6, 1–6
Loss	10–10	Jan 2023	Monastir Open, Tunisia	W40	Hard	(Japan) Sakura Hosogi	6–7^{(8)}, 4–6
Win	11–10	May 2023	Grado Tennis Cup, Italy	W60	Clay	(Czech Republic) Lucie Havlíčková	2–6, 6–3, 6–1
Loss	11–11	Jun 2023	Internazionali di Brescia, Italy	W60	Clay	(Ukraine) Katarina Zavatska	4–6, 2–6
Win	12–11	Oct 2024	Open de Touraine, France	W35	Hard	(Turkey) Ayla Aksu	7–6^{(4)}, 7–6^{(8)}
Win	13–11	Feb 2026	ITF Sharm El Sheikh, Egypt	W15	Hard	(Slovenia) Ela Nala Milić	6–2, 6–3
Win	14–11	Mar 2026	ITF Sharm El Sheikh, Egypt	W15	Hard	(Italy) Camilla Zanolini	0–6, 6–2, 7–6^{(10)}
Loss	14–12	Mar 2026	ITF Monastir, Tunisia	W15	Hard	(Germany) Mara Guth	3–6, 1–6
Loss	14–13	Sep 2026	ITF Sharm El Sheikh, Egypt	W35	Hard	Maria Golovina	2–6, 4–6
Win	15–13	Sep 2026	ITF Sharm El Sheikh, Egypt	W15	Hard	(Ukraine) Antonina Sushkova	6–4, 6–1

=== Doubles: 17 (11 titles, 6 runner-ups) ===
Legend W60/75 tournaments (2–0) W25/35 tournaments (2–2) W15 tournaments (7–4)	Finals by surface Hard (10–5) Clay (1–0) Carpet (0–1)

Result	W–L	Date	Tournament	Tier	Surface	Partner	Opponents	Score
Loss	0–1	Mar 2018	ITF Sharm El Sheikh, Egypt	15k	Hard	(Belarus) Iryna Shymanovich	(Denmark) Emilie Francati (Belgium) Britt Geukens	0–6, 3–6
Win	1–1	Mar 2018	ITF Sharm El Sheikh	15k	Hard	(Chinese Taipei) Lee Pei-chi	(Romania) Laura-Ioana Andrei (Bulgaria) Julia Terziyska	4–6, 7–6^{(5)}, [10–8]
Win	2–1	May 2019	ITF Jerusalem, Israel	W25	Hard	(Slovakia) Tereza Mihalíková	(United Kingdom) Samantha Murray (Greece) Despina Papamichail	2–6, 6–4, [10–8]
Win	3–1	Jan 2020	ITF Monastir, Tunisia	W15	Hard	(Slovakia) Tereza Mihalíková	(Kazakhstan) Gozal Ainitdinova (Kazakhstan) Yekaterina Dmitrichenko	6–4, 6–2
Win	4–1	Sep 2020	ITF Monastir, Tunisia	W15	Hard	(Belarus) Anna Kubareva	(Denmark) Olivia Gram (Latvia) Darja Semenistaja	2–6, 7–5, [10–6]
Win	5–1	Dec 2020	ITF Monastir, Tunisia	W15	Hard	(Poland) Weronika Falkowska	(Spain) Yvonne Cavallé Reimers (Spain) Celia Cervino Ruiz	6–4, 7–5
Loss	5–2	Feb 2022	ITF Sharm El Sheikh, Egypt	W25	Hard	(Russia) Anastasia Zakharova	(Greece) Sapfo Sakellaridi (Hong Kong) Cody Wong	5–7, 6–4, [6–10]
Win	6–2	Jul 2023	Internazionali di Roma, Italy	W60	Clay	(Kazakhstan) Zhibek Kulambayeva	(Colombia) María Paulina Pérez (Colombia) Yuliana Lizarazo	6–4, 6–4
Win	7–2	Nov 2024	ITF Lousada, Portugal	W35	Hard (i)	(Kazakhstan) Zhibek Kulambayeva	(Russia) Polina Iatcenko (Belgium) Hanne Vandewinkel	6–3, 1–6, [10–4]
Win	8–2	Jan 2025	Open Andrézieux-Bouthéon, France	W75	Hard (i)	(Turkey) Ayla Aksu	(Switzerland) Conny Perrin (Netherlands) Lian Tran	5–7, 6–4, [14–12]
Loss	8–3	Mar 2025	ITF Solarino, Italy	W35	Carpet	(Greece) Valentini Grammatikopoulou	(United States) Paris Corley (Poland) Weronika Falkowska	1–6, 1–6
Loss	8–4	Feb 2026	ITF Sharm El Sheikh, Egypt	W15	Hard	Daria Zelinskaya	(Ukraine) Kateryna Lazarenko (Lithuania) Andrė Lukošiūtė	1–6, 4–6
Win	9–4	Feb 2026	ITF Sharm El Sheikh	W15	Hard	Daria Zelinskaya	(Turkey) İrem Kurt (Czech Republic) Denisa Žoldáková	7–6^{(4)}, 4–6, [10–5]
Loss	9–5	Mar 2026	ITF Sharm El Sheikh	W15	Hard	(Egypt) Yasmin Ezzat	Daria Zelinskaya (Czech Republic) Denisa Žoldáková	1–6, 0–6
Win	10–5	Mar 2026	ITF Monastir, Tunisia	W15	Hard	Milana Zhabrailova	(United States) Julia Adams (Ukraine) Daria Yesypchuk	6–2, 6–4
Loss	10–6	Apr 2026	ITF Monastir, Tunisia	W15	Hard	Anna Kubareva	(Serbia) Elena Milovanović (Netherlands) Sarah van Emst	2–6, 5–7
Win	11–6	Sep 2026	ITF Sharm El Sheikh, Egypt	W15	Hard	Daria Zelinskaya	(Austria) Leonie Rabl (Austria) Liel Marlies Rothensteiner	7–5, 6–3
