= Città di Grado Tennis Cup =

WTA 125
- Event name: Città di Grado Tennis Cup
- Location: Grado, Italy
- Venue: Tennis Club Grado
- Category: WTA 125
- Surface: Clay / outdoor
- Draw: 32S/13Q/16D
- Prize money: $115,000

Current champions (2025)
- Singles: (Czech Republic) Tereza Valentová
- Doubles: (United States) Quinn Gleason (Brazil) Ingrid Martins

The Città di Grado Tennis Cup is a tournament for professional female tennis players played on outdoor clay courts. The event is classified as a $60,000 ITF Women's World Tennis Tour tournament and has been held in Grado, Italy, since 1998.

== Past finals ==
=== Singles ===
Year	Champion	Runner-up	Score
2026	Not held		
2025	(Czech Republic) Tereza Valentová	(Czech Republic) Barbora Palicová	6–2, 4–6, 6–1
↑ WTA 125 ↑
2024	(United Kingdom) Francesca Jones	(Liechtenstein) Kathinka von Deichmann	6–1, 7–5
2023	Yuliya Hatouka	(Czech Republic) Lucie Havlíčková	2–6, 6–3, 6–1
2022	(Italy) Elisabetta Cocciaretto	(Switzerland) Ylena In-Albon	6–2, 6–2
2021	(Spain) Nuria Párrizas Díaz	(Italy) Nuria Brancaccio	6–3, 5–7, 6–2
2020	(Germany) Sina Herrmann	(Belgium) Lara Salden	6–4, 7–5
2019	(Slovakia) Rebecca Šramková	(Romania) Jaqueline Cristian	7–6^{(7–3)}, 3–1, ret.
2018	(Turkey) Çağla Büyükakçay	(Italy) Martina Di Giuseppe	6–2, 6–2
2017	(Slovakia) Anna Karolína Schmiedlová	(Italy) Martina Trevisan	2–6, 6–2, 6–4
2016	(Romania) Ana Bogdan	(Sweden) Susanne Celik	2–6, 6–2, 7–6^{(7–1)}
2015	(Poland) Katarzyna Piter	(Slovakia) Kristína Schmiedlová	6–3, 6–0
2014	(Italy) Gioia Barbieri	(Ukraine) Kateryna Kozlova	6–4, 4–6, 6–4
2013	(Austria) Yvonne Meusburger	(Poland) Katarzyna Piter	6–2, 6–7^{(2–7)}, 6–3
2012	(Italy) Maria Elena Camerin	(Austria) Yvonne Meusburger	6–2, 6–3
2011	(Croatia) Ajla Tomljanović	(Romania) Alexandra Cadanțu	6–2, 6–4
2010	(Georgia (country)) Anna Tatishvili	(Serbia) Ana Jovanović	6–7^{(3–7)}, 6–3, 6–4
2009	(Czech Republic) Karolína Plíšková	(Germany) Julia Schruff	7–6^{(7–2)}, 7–5
2008	(Austria) Patricia Mayr	(Croatia) Jasmina Tinjić	6–4, 7–6^{(7–1)}
2007	(Belarus) Darya Kustova	(Germany) Angelika Rösch	6–2, 3–6, 6–2
2006	(Croatia) Sanja Ančić	(Croatia) Ana Vrljić	6–4, 3–6, 6–4
2005	(Belarus) Tatsiana Uvarova	(China) Yuan Meng	6–4, 6–4
2004	(Spain) Nuria Llagostera Vives	(Spain) Paula García	5–7, 6–2, 6–1
2003	(Slovakia) Martina Suchá	(Colombia) Catalina Castaño	6–1, 6–2
2002	(Romania) Edina Gallovits	(Morocco) Bahia Mouhtassine	6–3, 6–3
2001	(Italy) Valentina Sassi	(Italy) Antonella Serra Zanetti	6–3, 7–5
2000	(Spain) Gisela Riera	(Italy) Flora Perfetti	6–2, 6–4
1999	(Italy) Flavia Pennetta	(Slovakia) Martina Suchá	1–6, 6–4, 7–5
1998	(Austria) Evelyn Fauth	(Romania) Andreea Vanc	6–7, 6–1, 6–1

=== Doubles ===
Year	Champions	Runners-up	Score
2026	Not held		
2025	(United States) Quinn Gleason (Brazil) Ingrid Martins	(Slovenia) Veronika Erjavec (Czech Republic) Dominika Šalková	6–2, 5–7, [10–5]
↑ WTA 125 ↑
2024	(United States) Jessie Aney (Germany) Lena Papadakis	(Spain) Yvonne Cavallé Reimers (Italy) Aurora Zantedeschi	6–4, 7–5
2023	(United Kingdom) Emily Appleton (Germany) Julia Lohoff	Sofya Lansere (Czech Republic) Anna Sisková	3–6, 6–4, [11–9]
2022	Alena Fomina-Klotz (Slovenia) Dalila Jakupović	(Hong Kong) Eudice Chong (Chinese Taipei) Liang En-shuo	6–1, 6–4
2021	(Italy) Lucia Bronzetti (Bulgaria) Isabella Shinikova	(Italy) Federica Di Sarra (Italy) Camilla Rosatello	6–4, 2–6, [10–8]
2020	(Hungary) Anna Bondár (Hungary) Fanny Stollár	(Italy) Federica Di Sarra (Italy) Camilla Rosatello	7–5, 6–2
2019	(Kazakhstan) Anna Danilina (Hungary) Réka Luca Jani	(Uzbekistan) Akgul Amanmuradova (Romania) Cristina Dinu	6–2, 6–3
2018	(Italy) Giorgia Marchetti (Italy) Alice Matteucci	(Australia) Naiktha Bains (Japan) Rika Fujiwara	6–0, 6–4
2017	(Israel) Julia Glushko (Australia) Priscilla Hon	(Croatia) Tereza Mrdeža (Switzerland) Conny Perrin	7–5, 6–2
2016	(Argentina) Catalina Pella (Chile) Daniela Seguel	(Turkey) Başak Eraydın (Italy) Alice Matteucci	6–2, 7–6^{(10–8)}
2015	(Switzerland) Viktorija Golubic (Brazil) Beatriz Haddad Maia	(Canada) Sharon Fichman (Poland) Katarzyna Piter	6–3, 6–2
2014	(Paraguay) Verónica Cepede Royg (Liechtenstein) Stephanie Vogt	(Spain) Lara Arruabarrena (Argentina) Florencia Molinero	6–4, 6–2
2013	(Japan) Yurika Sema (China) Zhou Yimiao	(Switzerland) Viktorija Golubic (Latvia) Diāna Marcinkēviča	1–6, 7–5, [10–7]
2012	(Georgia (country)) Margalita Chakhnashvili (Georgia (country)) Ekaterine Gorgodze	(Italy) Claudia Giovine (Italy) Anastasia Grymalska	7–6^{(7–2)}, 7–6^{(7–1)}
2011	(Argentina) María Irigoyen (Russia) Ekaterina Ivanova	(China) Liu Wanting (China) Sun Shengnan	6–3, 6–0
2010	(China) Han Xinyun (China) Lu Jingjing	(Russia) Karina Pimkina (Russia) Marta Sirotkina	1–6, 6–4, [10–8]
2009	(Hungary) Anikó Kapros (Austria) Sandra Klemenschits	(Argentina) Jorgelina Cravero (Georgia (country)) Anna Tatishvili	6–3, 6–0
2008	(Colombia) Mariana Duque Mariño (Austria) Melanie Klaffner	(Mauritius) Marinne Giraud (Australia) Christina Wheeler	6–1, 6–2
2007	(Italy) Stefania Chieppa (Belarus) Darya Kustova	(Serbia) Ana Veselinović (Australia) Christina Wheeler	7–5, 6–3
2006	(United States) Tiffany Dabek (South Africa) Chanelle Scheepers	(France) Mailyne Andrieux (Croatia) Nika Ožegović	6–4, 4–6, 7–6^{(7–3)}
2005	(Russia) Maria Kondratieva (Belarus) Tatsiana Uvarova	(Australia) Daniella Dominikovic (Belarus) Darya Kustova	6–1, 3–6, 7–5
2004	(Spain) Rosa María Andrés Rodríguez (Romania) Andreea Vanc	(Poland) Klaudia Jans (Poland) Alicja Rosolska	6–2, 6–2
2003	(Bosnia and Herzegovina) Mervana Jugić-Salkić (Croatia) Darija Jurak	(Italy) Laura Dell'Angelo (Italy) Giorgia Mortello	2–6, 6–3, 6–0
2002	(Italy) Gloria Pizzichini (Czech Republic) Hana Šromová	(Socialist Federal Republic of Yugoslavia) Sandra Načuk (Madagascar) Natacha Randriantefy	6–3, 7–5
2001	(Croatia) Jelena Kostanić (Romania) Magda Mihalache	(Czech Republic) Renata Kučerová (Czech Republic) Eva Martincová	5–7, 6–3, 7–5
2000	(Brazil) Vanessa Menga (Spain) Alicia Ortuño	(Spain) Lourdes Domínguez Lino (Spain) María José Martínez Sánchez	3–6, 7–5, 6–1
1999	(France) Lea Ghirardi (France) Noëlle van Lottum	(Italy) Flavia Pennetta (United States) Tracy Almeda-Singian	1–6, 6–4, 6–4
1998	(Croatia) Marijana Kovačević (Croatia) Maja Palaveršić	(France) Vanina Casanova (Romania) Andreea Vanc	3–6, 6–3, 6–1
