= Maaya Rajeshwaran Revathi =

Indian tennis player (born 2009)

Maaya Rajeshwaran
- Full name: Maaya Rajeshwaran Revathi
- Country (sports): India
- Born: 12 June 2009 (age 17) Coimbatore, Tamil Nadu, India
- Height: 1.75 m (5 ft 9 in)
- Turned pro: 2025
- Plays: Right-handed (two-handed backhand)
- Prize money: US $21,949

Singles
- Career record: 26–16
- Career titles: 1 ITF
- Highest ranking: No. 489 (9 November 2026)
- Current ranking: No. 489 (9 November 2026)

Grand Slam singles results
- Australian Open Junior: 1R (2026)
- French Open Junior: 2R (2026)
- Wimbledon Junior: 1R (2026)
- US Open Junior: 2R (2025, 2026)

Doubles
- Career record: 6-9
- Career titles: 1 ITF
- Highest ranking: No. 557 (26 October 2026)
- Current ranking: No. 815 (2 November 2026)

Grand Slam doubles results
- Australian Open Junior: 2R (2026)
- Wimbledon Junior: QF (2026)
- US Open Junior: SF (2026)

Maaya Rajeshwaran Revathi (born 12 June 2009) is an Indian tennis player. She trains at the Rafa Nadal Academy.

== Early life ==
Maaya was born on 12 June 2009 to Tamil mother Revathi and father Rajeshwaran in Coimbatore. She began playing tennis when she was 8 years old and decided to go pro when she was 10 because she loved to compete. She started ITFs at 13 years of age, winning a couple and becoming a top 60 junior player. Her talent was spotted by the Rafa Nadal Academy and she got the call up invite through an email.

== Career ==
At the WTA 125 Mumbai Open in February 2025, she entered as a qualifying wild card. She defeated Iryna Shymanovich, Zarina Diyas, and Mei Yamaguchi to reach the semifinals. She lost to fifth seed Jil Teichmann marking the end of her run. Revathi is the first player born in 2009 to make this stage of a main draw at this level.

Revathi defeated Katarzyna Kawa in the first round of 2026 Chennai Open coming from 2–5 down in the third set to register her first WTA Tour main draw win, playing as the wildcard. In the second round, she defeated qualifier Weronika Falkowska in straight sets, to reach her maiden WTA Tour quarterfinal. She became the first Indian to do so since Sania Mirza in 2012 and became only the third Indian after Sania and Shikha Uberoi to make this stage of a WTA Tour event.

== ITF Circuit finals ==
=== Singles: 1 (1 title) ===
Legend W50 tournaments (0–0) W35 tournaments (1–0) W15 tournaments (0–0)	Finals by surface Hard (1–0) Clay (0–0)

Result	W–L	Date	Tournament	Tier	Surface	Opponent	Score
Win	1–0	Oct 2026	ITF Lagos, Portugal	W35	Hard	(Spain) Celia Cerviño Ruiz	6–4, 6–2

=== Doubles: 1 (1 title) ===
Legend W50 tournaments (0–0) W35 tournaments (1–0) W15 tournaments (0–0)	Finals by surface Hard (1–0) Clay (0–0)

Result	W–L	Date	Tournament	Tier	Surface	Partner	Opponents	Score
Win	1–0	Oct 2026	ITF Lagos, Portugal	W35	Hard	(Ukraine) Yelyzaveta Kotliar	(China) Liu Min (Italy) Carlotta Moccia	0–6, 6–2, [10–7]

== ITF Junior finals ==
Legend
Grade A
Grade 1
Grade 2
Grade 3
Grade 4
Grade 5

=== Singles (9–1) ===
Result	W–L	Date	Tournament	Tier	Surface	Opponent	Score
Win	1–0	Aug 2023	ITF Chennai, India	Grade 4	Clay	(India) Diya Ramesh	6–1, 6–4
Win	2–0	Sep 2023	ITF Hyderabad, India	Grade 4	Hard	(India) Saumya Ronde	6–2, 6–3
Win	3–0	Oct 2023	ITF Seremban, Malaysia	Grade 4	Hard	(India) Tejasvi Dabas	6–2, 6–2
Win	4–0	Oct 2023	ITF Perak, Malaysia	Grade 4	Hard	(Japan) Yu Kikawa	6–3, 6–3
Win	5–0	Dec 2023	ITF Pune, India	Grade 3	Hard	(India) Laxmisiri Dandu	6–4, 2–6, 6–3
Loss	5–1	Nov 2024	ITF Zapopan, Mexico	Grade 3	Clay	(Serbia) Petra Konjikušić	0–6, 4–6
Win	6–1	Jan 2025	ITF New Delhi, India	Grade 1	Hard	Ekaterina Tupitsyna	3–6, 7–5, 6–2
Win	7–1	June 2025	ITF Gladbeck, Germany	Grade 2	Clay	(Switzerland) Noella Manta	6–2, 6–4
Win	8–1	Apr 2026	ITF Beaulieu-sur-Mer, France	Grade 1	Clay	(Spain) Paola Pinera Celorio	4–6, 7–5, 6–4
Win	9–1	June 2026	ITF Bamberg, Germany	Grade 1	Clay	(Ukraine) Polina Skliar	6–4, 6–2

=== Doubles (6–3) ===
Result	W–L	Date	Tournament	Tier	Surface	Partner	Opponents	Score
Win	1–0	Aug 2023	ITF Chennai, India	Grade 4	Clay	(India) Aakruti Sonkusare	(India) Sreemanya Reddy Anugonda (India) Savitha Bhuvaneswaran	6–3, 6–2
Win	2–0	Sep 2023	ITF Hyderabad, India	Grade 4	Hard	(India) Rishitha Reddy Basireddy	(India) Durganshi Kumar (India) Amodini Naik	6–2, 6–4
Loss	2–1	Oct 2023	ITF Seremban, Malaysia	Grade 4	Hard	(India) Rishitha Reddy Basireddy	(India) Tejasvi Dabas (Japan) Rioko Umekuni	4–6, 7^{(6)}–6, [7–10]
Win	4–0	Oct 2023	ITF Perak, Malaysia	Grade 4	Hard	(India) Rishitha Reddy Basireddy	(Japan) Yu Kikawa (Japan) Rioko Umekuni	6–2, 4–6, [11–9]
Win	4–1	Nov 2024	ITF Zapopan, Mexico	Grade 3	Clay	(Serbia) Petra Konjikušić	(United States) Maria Aytoyan (United States) Shaya Jovanovic	6–3, 6–2
Loss	4–2	June 2025	ITF Gladbeck, Germany	Grade 2	Clay	(Australia) Koharu Nishikawa	(Spain) Gabriela Paun (South Korea) Ha-Yoon Son	6–7^{(4)}, 3–6
Win	5–2	Dec 2025	ITF Fort Lauderdale, USA	Grade A	Clay	(Serbia) Anastasija Cvetkovic	(Jamaica) Alyssa James (United States) Annika Penickova	7–5, 6–1
Loss	5–3	Jan 2026	ITF Traralgon, Australia	Grade 1	Hard	(Australia) Renee Alame	Mariia Makarova; Rada Zolotareva	1–6, 4–6
Win	6–3	Sep 2026	ITF Osaka, Japan	Grade A	Hard	(United States) Jordyn Hazelitt	(Japan) Rei Sato (Japan) Nagisa Shiomi	6–2, 6–2

== See also ==
- Tennis in India
