= Vaishnavi Adkar =

Indian tennis player (born 2004)

- Country (sports): India
- Born: 14 December 2004 (age 21) Pune, Maharashtra, India
- Plays: Right-handed (two-handed backhand)
- College: Savitribai Phule Pune University
- Prize money: $63,786

Singles
- Career record: 100–72
- Career titles: 2 ITF
- Highest ranking: No. 334 (26 October 2026)
- Current ranking: No. 334 (26 October 2026)

Doubles
- Career record: 43–54
- Career titles: 3 ITF
- Highest ranking: No. 299 (26 October 2026)
- Current ranking: No. 299 (26 October 2026)
Medal record
Women's tennis
Representing India
World University Games
Bronze medal – third place	2025 Rhine Ruhr	Individual
BRICS Games
Bronze medal – third place	2024 Kazan	Team
- Last updated on: 30 October 2026.

Vaishnavi Adkar (born 14 December 2004) is an Indian female tennis player. She competes primarily on the ITF Women's World Tennis Tour, where she has won two singles and three doubles titles. She won the bronze medal in the women's individual category of the 2025 Summer World University Games.

== Career ==
Adkar began playing tennis at the age of seven and prefers hardcourts. In 2024, she won the singles and doubles titles (along with Pooja Ingale) at a W15 tournament held in Ahmedabad, India.

She became the first Indian woman tennis player to win a medal in the World University Games by winning the bronze medal in the women's individual event.

She also broke the 46-year wait for an Indian to win a tennis medal since Nandan Bal's silver in the 1979 games.

Adkar made her WTA Tour main-draw debut as a lucky loser at the 2025 Chennai Open, but was defeated in the first round by third seed Donna Vekić in straight sets.

=== 2026: First WTA Tour main-draw win, historic doubles final ===
In February, Adkar became the first Indian woman since Sania Mirza to reach the singles final of the W100 Bengaluru Open, entering as a wildcard ranked 690th in the world and defeating two top-150 players en route to the final where she lost to Hanne Vandewinkel. As a result, she entered into top 500 in the WTA rankings. Next month, she won her biggest title at the W35 Kalaburgi event defeating Ankita Raina in straight sets. She reached another W35 final at Monastir in October but lost to Elena Milovanović. After receiving a wildcard entry for the Chennai Open, Vaishnavi defeated Jodie Burrage to get her first WTA Tour main-draw win, before losing to seventh seed Anastasia Zakharova in the second round. In the doubles competition at the same tournament, she teamed with Rutuja Bhosale to become the first all-Indian team to reach a WTA Tour doubles final. They lost to Naïma Karamoko and Simona Waltert.

== Career statistics ==
=== WTA Tour finals ===
==== Doubles: 1 (runner-up) ====
Legend WTA 250 (0–1)	Finals by surface Hard (0–1)

Result	W–L	Date	Tournament	Tier	Surface	Partner	Opponents	Score
Loss	0–1	Nov 2026	Chennai Open, India	WTA 250	Hard	(India) Rutuja Bhosale	(Switzerland) Naïma Karamoko (Switzerland) Simona Waltert	2–6, 0–6

=== ITF Circuit finals ===
==== Singles: 6 (2 titles, 4 runner-ups) ====
Legend
W100 tournaments (0–1)
W35 tournaments (1–1)
W15 tournaments (1–2)

Result	W–L	Date	Tournament	Tier	Surface	Opponent	Score
Loss	0–1	Sep 2023	ITF Monastir, Tunisia	W15	Hard	(Kazakhstan) Aruzhan Sagandykova	6–7^{(6–8)}, 0–6
Win	1–1	Dec 2024	ITF Ahmedabad, India	W15	Clay	(Denmark) Elena Jamshidi	6–2, 6–1
Loss	1–2	Jun 2025	ITF Florence, Uzbekistan	W15	Hard	Varvara Panshina	2–6, 4–6
Loss	1–3	Feb 2026	Bengaluru Open, India	W100	Hard	(Belgium) Hanne Vandewinkel	0–6, 1–6
Win	2–3	Mar 2026	ITF Kalaburgi, India	W35	Hard	(India) Ankita Raina	7–6^{(7–3)}, 6–4
Loss	2–4	Oct 2026	ITF Monastir, Tunisia	W35	Hard	(Serbia) Elena Milovanović	3–6, 5–7
