= Jessie Aney =

American tennis player

- Country (sports): United States
- Born: 19 April 1998 (age 27)
- Height: 1.70 m (5 ft 7 in)
- Plays: Right (one-handed backhand)
- College: University of North Carolina at Chapel Hill
- Prize money: $180,597

Singles
- Career record: 231–154
- Career titles: 3 ITF
- Highest ranking: No. 343 (17 July 2023)
- Current ranking: No. 699 (9 June 2025)

Doubles
- Career record: 182–110
- Career titles: 22 ITF
- Highest ranking: No. 102 (13 October 2025)
- Current ranking: No. 111 (9 June 2025)

Grand Slam doubles results
- US Open: 1R (2024)
- Last updated on: 9 June 2025.

Jessie Aney (born 19 April 1998) is an American tennis player. She has career-high WTA rankings of 343 in singles and 104 in doubles.

Aney has won three singles and 22 doubles titles on the ITF Women's World Tennis Tour.

== Career ==
Aney won her biggest title to date at the 2025 ITF Bengaluru Open, partnering compatriot Jessica Failla. She reached her first WTA Tour final at the 2023 Budapest Grand Prix, partnering Czech Anna Sisková, losing to Katarzyna Piter and Fanny Stollár.

== WTA Tour finals ==
=== Doubles: 1 (runner-up) ===
Legend Grand Slam (0–0) WTA 1000 (0–0) WTA 500 (0–0) WTA 250 (0–1)	Finals by surface Hard (0–0) Clay (0–1) Grass (0–0) Carpet (0–0)

Result	W–L	Date	Tournament	Tier	Surface	Partner	Opponents	Score
Loss	0–1	Jul 2023	Budapest Grand Prix, Hungary	WTA 250	Clay	(Czech Republic) Anna Sisková	(Poland) Katarzyna Piter (Hungary) Fanny Stollár	2–6, 6–4, [4–10]

== ITF Circuit finals ==
=== Singles: 7 (3 titles, 4 runner–ups) ===
Legend W60 tournaments (0–1) W15 tournaments (3–3)	Finals by surface Hard (1–3) Clay (2–1)

Result	W–L	Date	Tournament	Tier	Surface	Opponent	Score
Loss	0–1	Nov 2020	ITF Sharm El Sheikh, Egypt	W15	Hard	(Belarus) Iryna Shymanovich	3–6, 5–7
Win	1–1	Apr 2021	ITF Shymkent, Kazakhstan	W15	Clay	(Belarus) Evialina Laskevich	6–4, 6–2
Win	2–1	Apr 2021	ITF Shymkent, Kazakhstan	W15	Clay	(Serbia) Tamara Čurović	5–7, 7–6^{(6)}, 6–0
Loss	2–2	Jul 2023	Liepāja Open, Latvia	W60	Clay	(Latvia) Darja Semeņistaja	4–6, 4–6
Loss	2–3	Mar 2024	ITF Brossard, Canada	W15	Hard (i)	(United States) Catherine Harrison	6–4, 1–6, 3–6
Loss	2–4	Mar 2024	ITF Montreal, Canada	W15	Hard (i)	(United States) Jessica Failla	4–6, 3–6
Win	3–4	Oct 2024	ITF Mysuru, India	W15	Hard	(India) Shrivalli Bhamidipaty	3–6, 6–3, 7–6^{(6)}

=== Doubles: 35 (22 titles, 13 runner–ups) ===
Legend W100 tournaments (1–1) W60/75 tournaments (4–2) W40/50 tournaments (4–1) W25/35 tournaments (7–7) W15 tournaments (5–3)	Finals by surface Hard (8–5) Clay (13–8) Carpet (0–1)

Result	W–L	Date	Tournament	Tier	Surface	Partner	Opponents	Score
Loss	0–1	Nov 2018	ITF Monastir, Tunisia	W15	Hard	(United Kingdom) Olivia Sonnekus-Williams	(Serbia) Tamara Čurović (Belgium) Eliessa Vanlangendonck	0–6, 3–6
Win	1–1	Mar 2021	ITF Antalya, Turkey	W15	Clay	(Brazil) Ingrid Martins	(South Korea) Jang Su-jeong (South Korea) Park So-hyun	6–2, 6–2
Loss	1–2	Mar 2021	ITF Antalya, Turkey	W15	Clay	(South Korea) Park So-hyun	(South Korea) Han Na-lae (South Korea) Lee So-ra	6–4, 5–7, [4–10]
Win	2–2	Jun 2021	ITF Heraklion, Greece	W15	Clay	(Czech Republic) Michaela Bayerlová	(Israel) Nicole Khirin (Israel) Shavit Kimchi	6–4, 6–4
Win	3–2	Jun 2021	ITF Antalya, Turkey	W15	Clay	(United States) Christina Rosca	(Italy) Costanza Traversi (Romania) Andreea Velcea	6–1, 6–0
Loss	3–3	Jun 2021	ITF Antalya, Turkey	W15	Clay	(United States) Christina Rosca	(Turkey) Başak Eraydın (Hungary) Amarissa Kiara Tóth	6–4, 1–6, [7–10]
Win	4–3	Jul 2021	ITS Cup, Czech Republic	W60	Clay	(Czech Republic) Anna Sisková	(Chile) Bárbara Gatica (Brazil) Rebeca Pereira	6–1, 6–0
Loss	4–4	Jan 2022	ITF Florianópolis, Brazil	W25	Hard	(Brazil) Ingrid Martins	(Venezuela) Andrea Gámiz (United States) Sofia Sewing	6–7^{(2)}, 4–6
Loss	4–5	May 2022	ITF Osijek, Croatia	W25	Clay	(Brazil) Ingrid Martins	(Japan) Mana Kawamura (Japan) Funa Kozaki	3–6, 6–2, [8–10]
Win	5–5	Jun 2022	ITF Annenheim, Austria	W25	Clay	(Germany) Lena Papadakis	(Greece) Martha Matoula (Romania) Arina Vasilescu	1–6, 6–3, [11–9]
Win	6–5	Jun 2022	ITF Pörtschach, Austria	W60	Clay	(Czech Republic) Anna Sisková	(Switzerland) Jenny Dürst (Poland) Weronika Falkowska	6–3, 6–4
Loss	6–6	Jul 2022	ITF Dallas, United States	W25	Hard	(United States) Jessica Failla	Maria Kozyreva; Veronika Miroshnichenko	4–6, 7–6^{(7)}, [5–10]
Win	7–6	Oct 2022	ITF Otočec, Slovenia	W25	Clay	(Czech Republic) Anna Sisková	Irina Khromacheva; Iryna Shymanovich	3–0 ret.
Win	8–6	Oct 2022	ITF Santa Margherita di Pula, Italy	W25	Clay	(Greece) Sapfo Sakellaridi	(Italy) Camilla Rosatello (Italy) Aurora Zantedeschi	7–6^{(1)}, 6–4
Loss	8–7	Oct 2022	ITF Santa Margherita di Pula, Italy	W25	Clay	(Greece) Sapfo Sakellaridi	(Italy) Camilla Rosatello (Italy) Angelica Moratelli	7–6^{(4)}, 5–7, [5–10]
Win	9–7	Oct 2022	ITF Santa Margherita di Pula, Italy	W25	Clay	(Greece) Sapfo Sakellaridi	(Italy) Nuria Brancaccio (Italy) Angelica Moratelli	7–6^{(2)}, 7–5
Win	10–7	Jan 2023	ITF Tallinn, Estonia	W40	Hard (i)	(Czech Republic) Anna Sisková	(United Kingdom) Freya Christie (United Kingdom) Ali Collins	6–4, 6–7^{(3)}, [10–7]
Win	11–7	Mar 2023	ITF Fredericton, Canada	W25	Hard (i)	(United States) Dalayna Hewitt	(United States) Quinn Gleason (United States) Jamie Loeb	7–6^{(2)}, 6–4
Win	12–7	Apr 2023	ITF Guayaquil, Ecuador	W25	Clay	(United States) Sofia Sewing	(Ecuador) Noelia Bouzo Zanotti (Bulgaria) Ani Vangelova	6–0, 6–2
Win	13–7	Apr 2023	ITF Guayaquil, Ecuador	W25	Clay	(United States) Sofia Sewing	(Brazil) Ana Candiotto (Brazil) Rebeca Pereira	6–1, 6–2
Loss	13–8	May 2023	ITF Warmbad Villach, Austria	W25	Clay	(Germany) Lena Papadakis	(Switzerland) Jenny Dürst (Slovenia) Nika Radišić	2–6, 6–7^{(4)}
Win	14–8	Sep 2023	Berkeley Club Challenge, US	W60	Hard	(Colombia) María Herazo González	(Australia) Elysia Bolton (Australia) Alexandra Bozovic	7–5, 7–5
Loss	14–9	Oct 2023	ITF Templeton Pro, US	W60	Hard	(United States) Jaeda Daniel	(United States) McCartney Kessler (United States) Alana Smith	5–7, 4–6
Win	15–9	Oct 2023	ITF Solarino, Italy	W25	Carpet	(Germany) Lena Papadakis	(Italy) Giorgia Pedone (Italy) Lisa Pigato	6–3, 3–6, [10–6]
Loss	15–10	Dec 2023	ITF Nairobi, Kenya	W25	Clay	(Germany) Lena Papadakis	(Burundi) Sada Nahimana (Kenya) Angella Okutoyi	4–6, 6–3, [7–10]
Win	16–10	Jan 2024	ITF Indore, India	W50	Hard	(Germany) Lena Papadakis	(Japan) Saki Imamura (Japan) Mana Kawamura	2–6, 6–0, [10–7]
Win	17–10	Feb 2024	ITF Mexico City, Mexico	W50	Hard	(United States) Jessica Failla	(Brazil) Thaisa Grana Pedretti (Mexico) María Portillo Ramírez	3–6, 6–4, [10–8]
Win	18–10	Mar 2024	ITF Montreal, Canada	W15	Hard (i)	(France) Alice Robbe	(United States) Ashton Bowers (Poland) Zuzanna Pawlikowska	5–7, 6–3, [10–3]
Win	19–10	May 2024	Grado Tennis Cup, Italy	W75	Clay	(Germany) Lena Papadakis	(Spain) Yvonne Cavallé Reimers (Italy) Aurora Zantedeschi	6–4, 7–5
Loss	19–11	Jun 2024	ITS Cup, Czech Republic	W75	Clay	(Germany) Lena Papadakis	Amina Anshba (Greece) Valentini Grammatikopoulou	2–6, 4–6
Win	20–11	Oct 2024	ITF Mysuru, India	W15	Hard	(India) Riya Bhatia	(India) Akanksha Dileep Nitture (India) Soha Sadiq	6–1, 6–1
Loss	20–12	Jan 2025	ITF New Delhi, India	W50+H	Hard	(United States) Jessica Failla	(United Kingdom) Naiktha Bains (India) Ankita Raina	4–6, 6–3, [8–10]
Win	21–12	Jan 2025	ITF Bengaluru Open, India	W100	Hard	(United States) Jessica Failla	Amina Anshba; Elena Pridankina	6–2, 4–6, [10–6]
Win	22–12	Mar 2025	ITF Chihuahua, Mexico	W50	Clay	(United States) Jessica Failla	(Greece) Eleni Christofi (Greece) Despina Papamichail	6–3, 7–5
Loss	22–13	Jun 2025	Open de Biarritz, France	W100	Clay	(Lithuania) Justina Mikulskytė	(Spain) Irene Burillo Escorihuela (Mexico) María Portillo Ramírez	6–4, 1–6, [5–10]
