= 2025 ITF Women's World Tennis Tour (January–March) =

The 2025 ITF Women's World Tennis Tour is the 2025 edition of the second-tier tour for women's professional tennis. It is organised by the International Tennis Federation and is a tier below the WTA Tour. The ITF Women's World Tennis Tour includes tournaments in five categories with prize money ranging from $15,000 up to $100,000.

== Key ==
Category
W100 tournaments ($100,000)
W75 tournaments ($60,000)
W50 tournaments ($40,000)
W35 tournaments ($30,000)
W15 tournaments ($15,000)

=== January ===
Week of	Tournament	Winner	Runners-up	Semifinalists	Quarterfinalists
December 30	ITF Nonthaburi; Nonthaburi, Thailand; Hard; W75; Singles - Doubles	(Japan) Kyōka Okamura; 7–5, 1–6, 7–5	(Liechtenstein) Kathinka von Deichmann	(India) Sahaja Yamalapalli (United States) Claire Liu	(Belgium) Hanne Vandewinkel (United States) Maria Mateas (China) Ma Yexin (Thailand) Lanlana Tararudee
December 30	ITF Nonthaburi; Nonthaburi, Thailand; Hard; W75; Singles - Doubles	(United States) Maria Mateas (United States) Alana Smith; 6–1, 6–3	(Chinese Taipei) Cho I-hsuan (Chinese Taipei) Cho Yi-tsen	(India) Sahaja Yamalapalli (United States) Claire Liu	(Belgium) Hanne Vandewinkel (United States) Maria Mateas (China) Ma Yexin (Thailand) Lanlana Tararudee
December 30	Nairobi, Kenya; Clay; W35; Singles and doubles draws	(Chinese Taipei) Joanna Garland; 6–1, 6–1	(Netherlands) Lian Tran	(France) Alyssa Réguer (Poland) Monika Stankiewicz	(Kenya) Angella Okutoyi (Germany) Lorena Schaedel (Italy) Francesca Pace (Germany) Sina Herrmann
December 30	Nairobi, Kenya; Clay; W35; Singles and doubles draws	(Burundi) Sada Nahimana (Japan) Rinon Okuwaki; 7–6^{(7–3)}, 6–2	(France) Alyssa Réguer (Belgium) Vicky Van de Peer	(France) Alyssa Réguer (Poland) Monika Stankiewicz	(Kenya) Angella Okutoyi (Germany) Lorena Schaedel (Italy) Francesca Pace (Germany) Sina Herrmann
January 6	ITF Nonthaburi 2 Nonthaburi, Thailand; Hard; W75; Singles - Doubles	(China) Yao Xinxin; 6–4, 6–0	(China) Zheng Wushuang	Kristina Dmitruk; Mariia Tkacheva	(France) Tessah Andrianjafitrimo (Croatia) Petra Marčinko (Hong Kong) Cody Wong (United States) Maria Mateas
January 6	ITF Nonthaburi 2 Nonthaburi, Thailand; Hard; W75; Singles - Doubles	(South Korea) Jang Su-jeong (China) Zheng Wushuang; 4–6, 6–0, [10–6]	(India) Rutuja Bhosale (Hong Kong) Eudice Chong	Kristina Dmitruk; Mariia Tkacheva	(France) Tessah Andrianjafitrimo (Croatia) Petra Marčinko (Hong Kong) Cody Wong (United States) Maria Mateas
January 6	Le Lamentin (Martinique), France; Hard; W35; Singles and doubles draws	(Canada) Victoria Mboko; 7–5, 6–3	(United States) Clervie Ngounoue	(Canada) Cadence Brace (France) Harmony Tan	(Germany) Nicole Rivkin (France) Mathilde Lollia (Poland) Olivia Lincer (Germany) Angelina Wirges
January 6	Le Lamentin (Martinique), France; Hard; W35; Singles and doubles draws	(Canada) Cadence Brace (Canada) Victoria Mboko; 6–2, 7–6^{(7–2)}	(Poland) Olivia Lincer (United States) Clervie Ngounoue	(Canada) Cadence Brace (France) Harmony Tan	(Germany) Nicole Rivkin (France) Mathilde Lollia (Poland) Olivia Lincer (Germany) Angelina Wirges
January 6	Nairobi, Kenya; Clay; W35; Singles and doubles draws	(Chinese Taipei) Joanna Garland; 6–1, 6–4	(Kenya) Angella Okutoyi	(Poland) Zuzanna Pawlikowska (Belgium) Vicky Van de Peer	(Poland) Monika Stankiewicz (Burundi) Sada Nahimana (France) Alyssa Réguer (Italy) Francesca Pace
January 6	Nairobi, Kenya; Clay; W35; Singles and doubles draws	(Burundi) Sada Nahimana (Kenya) Angella Okutoyi; 6–3, 6–3	(Netherlands) Demi Tran (Netherlands) Lian Tran	(Poland) Zuzanna Pawlikowska (Belgium) Vicky Van de Peer	(Poland) Monika Stankiewicz (Burundi) Sada Nahimana (France) Alyssa Réguer (Italy) Francesca Pace
January 6	Naples Women's World Tennis Tour; Naples, United States; Clay; W35; Singles and doubles draws	(Canada) Katherine Sebov; 6–2, 6–0	(Italy) Jessica Pieri	(United States) Victoria Osuigwe (United States) Elizabeth Mandlik	(United States) Allura Zamarripa (Bulgaria) Lia Karatancheva (Italy) Tatiana Pieri (Georgia (country)) Ekaterine Gorgodze
January 6	Naples Women's World Tennis Tour; Naples, United States; Clay; W35; Singles and doubles draws	(United States) Allura Zamarripa (United States) Maribella Zamarripa; 7–5, 6–1	(France) Julie Belgraver (Netherlands) Jasmijn Gimbrère	(United States) Victoria Osuigwe (United States) Elizabeth Mandlik	(United States) Allura Zamarripa (Bulgaria) Lia Karatancheva (Italy) Tatiana Pieri (Georgia (country)) Ekaterine Gorgodze
January 6	Oslo, Norway; Hard (i); W15; Singles and doubles draws	(Netherlands) Anouck Vrancken Peeters; 6–2, 7–5	(Germany) Josy Daems	(Netherlands) Stéphanie Visscher (Czech Republic) Nikola Bartůňková	(Norway) Matylda Burylo (United Kingdom) Amelia Rajecki (France) Amandine Monnot (Germany) Emily Seibold
January 6	Oslo, Norway; Hard (i); W15; Singles and doubles draws	(Sweden) Linea Bajraliu (Netherlands) Joy de Zeeuw; 6–3, 6–0	(United Kingdom) Amelia Rajecki (Slovakia) Katarína Strešnáková	(Netherlands) Stéphanie Visscher (Czech Republic) Nikola Bartůňková	(Norway) Matylda Burylo (United Kingdom) Amelia Rajecki (France) Amandine Monnot (Germany) Emily Seibold
January 6	Antalya, Turkey; Clay; W15; Singles and doubles draws	(Czech Republic) Eliška Ticháčková; 3–6, 6–2, 7–5	Diana Demidova	Elina Nepliy; Daria Shadchneva	(Germany) Mina Hodzic (Slovakia) Laura Cíleková (Turkey) İlay Yörük (Czech Republic) Barbora Michálková
January 6	Antalya, Turkey; Clay; W15; Singles and doubles draws	(Kazakhstan) Sandugash Kenzhibayeva (Turkey) İlay Yörük; 6–4, 5–7, [10–8]	(Germany) Mina Hodzic (Switzerland) Marie Mettraux	Elina Nepliy; Daria Shadchneva	(Germany) Mina Hodzic (Slovakia) Laura Cíleková (Turkey) İlay Yörük (Czech Republic) Barbora Michálková
January 6	Monastir, Tunisia; Hard; W15; Singles and doubles draws	(France) Astrid Lew Yan Foon; 3–0 ret.	(Germany) Lara Schmidt	Ksenia Zaytseva (Romania) Andreea Prisăcariu	(Germany) Anna Gabric (Kazakhstan) Aruzhan Sagandikova (China) Yang Yidi (Italy) Lara Pfeifer
January 6	Monastir, Tunisia; Hard; W15; Singles and doubles draws	(Slovenia) Živa Falkner (Serbia) Elena Milovanović; 6–4, 6–4	Maria Golovina (Kazakhstan) Aruzhan Sagandikova	Ksenia Zaytseva (Romania) Andreea Prisăcariu	(Germany) Anna Gabric (Kazakhstan) Aruzhan Sagandikova (China) Yang Yidi (Italy) Lara Pfeifer
January 13	New Delhi, India; Hard; W50; Singles and doubles draws	Tatiana Prozorova; 4–6, 7–6^{(8–6)}, 6–4	(Hungary) Panna Udvardy	(Latvia) Darja Semeņistaja (United Kingdom) Lily Miyazaki	Anastasia Tikhonova; Maria Kozyreva (Slovenia) Dalila Jakupović (Czech Republic) Laura Samson
January 13	New Delhi, India; Hard; W50; Singles and doubles draws	(United Kingdom) Naiktha Bains (India) Ankita Raina; 6–4, 3–6, [10–8]	(United States) Jessie Aney (United States) Jessica Failla	(Latvia) Darja Semeņistaja (United Kingdom) Lily Miyazaki	Anastasia Tikhonova; Maria Kozyreva (Slovenia) Dalila Jakupović (Czech Republic) Laura Samson
January 13	La Marsa, Tunisia; Hard; W50; Singles and doubles draws	(Belgium) Hanne Vandewinkel; 6–4, 6–1	(Poland) Linda Klimovičová	(Spain) Andrea Lázaro García (Czech Republic) Gabriela Knutson	(Italy) Lucrezia Stefanini (China) You Xiaodi (Germany) Anna Gabric; Anastasia Gasanova
January 13	La Marsa, Tunisia; Hard; W50; Singles and doubles draws	(China) Xiao Zhenghua (China) Yuan Chengyiyi; 2–6, 7–5, [10–8]	Anastasia Gasanova; Anastasia Zolotareva	(Spain) Andrea Lázaro García (Czech Republic) Gabriela Knutson	(Italy) Lucrezia Stefanini (China) You Xiaodi (Germany) Anna Gabric; Anastasia Gasanova
January 13	Petit-Bourg (Guadeloupe), France; Hard; W35; Singles and doubles draws	(Canada) Victoria Mboko; 6–4, 6–0	(United States) Clervie Ngounoue	(United States) Hina Inoue (France) Harmony Tan	(Germany) Kathleen Kanev (France) Alizé Lim (Poland) Olivia Lincer (Germany) Angelina Wirges
January 13	Petit-Bourg (Guadeloupe), France; Hard; W35; Singles and doubles draws	(Canada) Victoria Mboko (United States) Clervie Ngounoue; 6–3, 6–1	(United States) Jenna Dean (Mexico) Amanda Carolina Nava Elkin	(United States) Hina Inoue (France) Harmony Tan	(Germany) Kathleen Kanev (France) Alizé Lim (Poland) Olivia Lincer (Germany) Angelina Wirges
January 13	Palm Coast, United States; Clay; W35; Singles and doubles draws	(United States) Elizabeth Mandlik; 6–1, 6–7^{(4–7)}, 6–3	(United States) Whitney Osuigwe	(United States) Vivian Wolff (France) Julie Belgraver	(Romania) Irina Bara (United States) Sophie Chang (Italy) Diletta Cherubini (Canada) Carson Branstine
January 13	Palm Coast, United States; Clay; W35; Singles and doubles draws	(Netherlands) Jasmijn Gimbrère (Sweden) Lisa Zaar; 6–4, 3–6, [10–8]	(United States) Ayana Akli (United States) Abigail Rencheli	(United States) Vivian Wolff (France) Julie Belgraver	(Romania) Irina Bara (United States) Sophie Chang (Italy) Diletta Cherubini (Canada) Carson Branstine
January 13	Buenos Aires, Argentina; Clay; W35; Singles and doubles draws	(Brazil) Carolina Alves; 6–2, 6–4	(Argentina) Jazmin Ortenzi	(Greece) Despina Papamichail (Italy) Nicole Fossa Huergo	(Argentina) María Florencia Urrutia (Argentina) Victoria Bosio (Italy) Anastasia Abbagnato (Argentina) Luisina Giovannini
January 13	Buenos Aires, Argentina; Clay; W35; Singles and doubles draws	(Italy) Anastasia Abbagnato (Italy) Nicole Fossa Huergo; 3–6, 6–4, [10–8]	(Italy) Silvia Ambrosio (Italy) Verena Meliss	(Greece) Despina Papamichail (Italy) Nicole Fossa Huergo	(Argentina) María Florencia Urrutia (Argentina) Victoria Bosio (Italy) Anastasia Abbagnato (Argentina) Luisina Giovannini
January 13	Monastir, Tunisia; Hard; W15; Singles and doubles draws	(Germany) Katharina Hobgarski; 7–5, 6–3	(South Korea) Lee Eun-ji	(Spain) Eva Guerrero Álvarez (France) Nina Radovanovic	Daria Egorova (Hungary) Adrienn Nagy (United States) Dalayna Hewitt (France) Astrid Lew Yan Foon
January 13	Monastir, Tunisia; Hard; W15; Singles and doubles draws	(Greece) Sapfo Sakellaridi (Slovakia) Radka Zelníčková; 6–1, 6–3	(United States) Dalayna Hewitt (Serbia) Elena Milovanović	(Spain) Eva Guerrero Álvarez (France) Nina Radovanovic	Daria Egorova (Hungary) Adrienn Nagy (United States) Dalayna Hewitt (France) Astrid Lew Yan Foon
January 13	Antalya, Turkey; Clay; W15; Singles and doubles draws	(Czech Republic) Eliška Ticháčková; 6–0, 5–7, 7–6^{(7–4)}	(Japan) Rinko Matsuda	Elina Nepliy (Germany) Mina Hodzic	(Bulgaria) Isabella Shinikova (China) Lu Jingjing; Daria Shadchneva (Romania) Elena Ruxandra Bertea
January 13	Antalya, Turkey; Clay; W15; Singles and doubles draws	(Kazakhstan) Sandugash Kenzhibayeva (Czech Republic) Eliška Ticháčková; 1–6, 6–1, [10–8]	(Germany) Joëlle Steur (Belgium) Amelie Van Impe	Elina Nepliy (Germany) Mina Hodzic	(Bulgaria) Isabella Shinikova (China) Lu Jingjing; Daria Shadchneva (Romania) Elena Ruxandra Bertea
January 20	ITF Bengaluru Open; Bengaluru, India; Hard; W100; Singles - Doubles	(Germany) Tatjana Maria; 6–7^{(0–7)}, 6–3, 6–4	(France) Léolia Jeanjean	(Czech Republic) Linda Fruhvirtová (Czech Republic) Sára Bejlek	(Thailand) Lanlana Tararudee (Slovenia) Dalila Jakupović (India) Sahaja Yamalapalli (Canada) Rebecca Marino
January 20	ITF Bengaluru Open; Bengaluru, India; Hard; W100; Singles - Doubles	(United States) Jessie Aney (United States) Jessica Failla; 6–2, 4–6, [10–6]	Amina Anshba; Elena Pridankina	(Czech Republic) Linda Fruhvirtová (Czech Republic) Sára Bejlek	(Thailand) Lanlana Tararudee (Slovenia) Dalila Jakupović (India) Sahaja Yamalapalli (Canada) Rebecca Marino
January 20	Porto Women's Indoor ITF; Porto, Portugal; Hard (i); W75; Singles and doubles draws	(Czech Republic) Tereza Valentová; 6–3, 6–4	(Germany) Nastasja Schunk	(Italy) Matilde Paoletti (United States) Tyra Caterina Grant	(Portugal) Matilde Jorge (Portugal) Francisca Jorge (Germany) Ella Seidel; Oksana Selekhmeteva
January 20	Porto Women's Indoor ITF; Porto, Portugal; Hard (i); W75; Singles and doubles draws	(Hong Kong) Eudice Chong (Slovenia) Nika Radišić; 7–6^{(7–5)}, 6–1	(Germany) Noma Noha Akugue (Czech Republic) Tereza Valentová	(Italy) Matilde Paoletti (United States) Tyra Caterina Grant	(Portugal) Matilde Jorge (Portugal) Francisca Jorge (Germany) Ella Seidel; Oksana Selekhmeteva
January 20	Vero Beach International Tennis Open; Vero Beach, United States; Clay; W75; Singles and doubles draws	(Argentina) Solana Sierra; 6–7^{(6–8)}, 6–4, 7–5	(United States) Whitney Osuigwe	(United States) Lauren Davis (Canada) Carson Branstine	(Italy) Jessica Pieri (Canada) Kayla Cross (United States) Akasha Urhobo (Canada) Katherine Sebov
January 20	Vero Beach International Tennis Open; Vero Beach, United States; Clay; W75; Singles and doubles draws	(United States) Carmen Corley (Netherlands) Eva Vedder; 6–2, 6–3	(France) Julie Belgraver (Netherlands) Jasmijn Gimbrère	(United States) Lauren Davis (Canada) Carson Branstine	(Italy) Jessica Pieri (Canada) Kayla Cross (United States) Akasha Urhobo (Canada) Katherine Sebov
January 20	La Marsa, Tunisia; Hard; W50; Singles and doubles draws	(Poland) Linda Klimovičová; 6–3, 6–2	(Spain) Andrea Lázaro García	(Lithuania) Justina Mikulskytė (Spain) Guiomar Maristany	(Czech Republic) Laura Samson (Belgium) Hanne Vandewinkel (France) Manon Léonard (Czech Republic) Gabriela Knutson
January 20	La Marsa, Tunisia; Hard; W50; Singles and doubles draws	(China) Guo Meiqi (China) Xiao Zhenghua; 6–3, 6–4	(Spain) Ángela Fita Boluda (Switzerland) Ylena In-Albon	(Lithuania) Justina Mikulskytė (Spain) Guiomar Maristany	(Czech Republic) Laura Samson (Belgium) Hanne Vandewinkel (France) Manon Léonard (Czech Republic) Gabriela Knutson
January 20	Esch-sur-Alzette, Luxembourg; Hard (i); W35; Singles and doubles draws	(Germany) Anna-Lena Friedsam; 3–6, 6–0, 7–5	(United Kingdom) Emily Appleton	Alisa Oktiabreva (Netherlands) Anouck Vrancken Peeters	(Finland) Anastasia Kulikova; Julia Avdeeva (France) Harmony Tan (France) Amandine Monnot
January 20	Esch-sur-Alzette, Luxembourg; Hard (i); W35; Singles and doubles draws	(Czech Republic) Aneta Kučmová (Czech Republic) Aneta Laboutková; 6–3, 6–2	(Ukraine) Veronika Podrez (France) Marine Szostak	Alisa Oktiabreva (Netherlands) Anouck Vrancken Peeters	(Finland) Anastasia Kulikova; Julia Avdeeva (France) Harmony Tan (France) Amandine Monnot
January 20	GB Pro-Series Sunderland; Sunderland, United Kingdom; Hard (i); W35; Singles and doubles draws	(Czech Republic) Nikola Bartůňková; 6–4, 3–6, 6–3	(United Kingdom) Amelia Rajecki	(Belgium) Sofia Costoulas (France) Yara Bartashevich	(Croatia) Iva Primorac (South Korea) Park So-hyun (United States) Julia Adams (Austria) Tamira Paszek
January 20	GB Pro-Series Sunderland; Sunderland, United Kingdom; Hard (i); W35; Singles and doubles draws	(United Kingdom) Amelia Rajecki (United States) Anna Rogers; 2–6, 6–3, [10–8]	(South Korea) Park So-hyun (Hong Kong) Cody Wong	(Belgium) Sofia Costoulas (France) Yara Bartashevich	(Croatia) Iva Primorac (South Korea) Park So-hyun (United States) Julia Adams (Austria) Tamira Paszek
January 20	Buenos Aires, Argentina; Clay; W35; Singles and doubles draws	(Argentina) Luisina Giovannini; 6–4, 6–4	(Argentina) Jazmin Ortenzi	(Brazil) Carolina Alves (Greece) Despina Papamichail	(Mexico) Victoria Rodríguez (Bulgaria) Gergana Topalova (Italy) Miriana Tona (Italy) Anastasia Abbagnato
January 20	Buenos Aires, Argentina; Clay; W35; Singles and doubles draws	(Mexico) Victoria Rodríguez (Mexico) Ana Sofía Sánchez; 5–7, 6–2, [10–8]	(Czech Republic) Michaela Bayerlová (Romania) Briana Szabó	(Brazil) Carolina Alves (Greece) Despina Papamichail	(Mexico) Victoria Rodríguez (Bulgaria) Gergana Topalova (Italy) Miriana Tona (Italy) Anastasia Abbagnato
January 20	Monastir, Tunisia; Hard; W15; Singles and doubles draws	(Spain) Eva Guerrero Álvarez; 7–5, 6–1	(Hungary) Adrienn Nagy	(Greece) Sapfo Sakellaridi (United States) Jenna DeFalco	(Sweden) Tiana Tian Deng; Anastasia Sukhotina (Japan) Hayu Kinoshita; Ksenia Zaytseva
January 20	Monastir, Tunisia; Hard; W15; Singles and doubles draws	(Japan) Hiromi Abe (Japan) Mayuka Aikawa; 6–3, 6–0	(Japan) Hayu Kinoshita; Ksenia Zaytseva	(Greece) Sapfo Sakellaridi (United States) Jenna DeFalco	(Sweden) Tiana Tian Deng; Anastasia Sukhotina (Japan) Hayu Kinoshita; Ksenia Zaytseva
January 20	Antalya, Turkey; Clay; W15; Singles and doubles draws	(Georgia (country)) Sofia Shapatava; 6–3, 4–6, 6–4	Diana Demidova	(Romania) Bianca Bărbulescu (Italy) Martina Colmegna	(Switzerland) Marie Mettraux (Austria) Claudia Gasparovic (Spain) Claudia Hoste Ferrer (Germany) Mina Hodzic
January 20	Antalya, Turkey; Clay; W15; Singles and doubles draws	(Kazakhstan) Sandugash Kenzhibayeva (Germany) Joëlle Steur; 3–6, 6–4, [10–2]	(Kazakhstan) Asylzhan Arystanbekova; Daria Shadchneva	(Romania) Bianca Bărbulescu (Italy) Martina Colmegna	(Switzerland) Marie Mettraux (Austria) Claudia Gasparovic (Spain) Claudia Hoste Ferrer (Germany) Mina Hodzic
January 27	Brisbane QTC Tennis International; Brisbane, Australia; Hard; W75; Singles and doubles draws	(Australia) Priscilla Hon; 6–4, 4–6, 6–2	(Switzerland) Leonie Küng	(Australia) Emerson Jones (Australia) Astra Sharma	(Australia) Maddison Inglis (Norway) Malene Helgø (Australia) Taylah Preston (United States) Karina Miller
January 27	Brisbane QTC Tennis International; Brisbane, Australia; Hard; W75; Singles and doubles draws	(Australia) Petra Hule (Australia) Elena Micic; 2–6, 6–2, [10–6]	(Australia) Lizette Cabrera (Australia) Taylah Preston	(Australia) Emerson Jones (Australia) Astra Sharma	(Australia) Maddison Inglis (Norway) Malene Helgø (Australia) Taylah Preston (United States) Karina Miller
January 27	Pune, India; Hard; W75; Singles and doubles draws	Tatiana Prozorova; 4–6, 7–5, 6–3	(France) Léolia Jeanjean	(Hungary) Panna Udvardy; Elena Pridankina	(Brazil) Laura Pigossi (United Kingdom) Lily Miyazaki (Liechtenstein) Kathinka von Deichmann; Iryna Shymanovich
January 27	Pune, India; Hard; W75; Singles and doubles draws	Alevtina Ibragimova; Elena Pridankina; 6–2, 1–6, [10–8]	Maria Kozyreva; Iryna Shymanovich	(Hungary) Panna Udvardy; Elena Pridankina	(Brazil) Laura Pigossi (United Kingdom) Lily Miyazaki (Liechtenstein) Kathinka von Deichmann; Iryna Shymanovich
January 27	Open Andrézieux-Bouthéon 42; Andrézieux-Bouthéon, France; Hard (i); W75; Singles and doubles draws	(France) Manon Léonard; 1–6, 6–3, 6–4	(France) Elsa Jacquemot	(France) Harmony Tan (Andorra) Victoria Jiménez Kasintseva	(Spain) Marina Bassols Ribera (Turkey) Çağla Büyükakçay (France) Margaux Rouvroy (Turkey) Ayla Aksu
January 27	Open Andrézieux-Bouthéon 42; Andrézieux-Bouthéon, France; Hard (i); W75; Singles and doubles draws	(Turkey) Ayla Aksu; Yuliya Hatouka; 5–7, 6–4, [14–12]	(Switzerland) Conny Perrin (Netherlands) Lian Tran	(France) Harmony Tan (Andorra) Victoria Jiménez Kasintseva	(Spain) Marina Bassols Ribera (Turkey) Çağla Büyükakçay (France) Margaux Rouvroy (Turkey) Ayla Aksu
January 27	Georgia's Rome Tennis Open; Rome, United States; Hard (i); W75; Singles and doubles draws	(Canada) Victoria Mboko; 7–5, 6–3	(Netherlands) Eva Vedder	(Canada) Cadence Brace (United States) Hanna Chang	(Sweden) Lisa Zaar (Canada) Kayla Cross (United States) Whitney Osuigwe (Colombia) Emiliana Arango
January 27	Georgia's Rome Tennis Open; Rome, United States; Hard (i); W75; Singles and doubles draws	(United States) Sophie Chang (United States) Angela Kulikov; 7–6^{(7–3)}, 6–4	(United States) Whitney Osuigwe (Netherlands) Eva Vedder	(Canada) Cadence Brace (United States) Hanna Chang	(Sweden) Lisa Zaar (Canada) Kayla Cross (United States) Whitney Osuigwe (Colombia) Emiliana Arango
January 27	Porto Women's Indoor ITF 2 Porto, Portugal; Hard (i); W50; Singles and doubles draws	(Lithuania) Justina Mikulskytė; 6–7^{(2–7)}, 6–3, 6–2	(United States) Tyra Caterina Grant	(Germany) Anna-Lena Friedsam (United States) Rasheeda McAdoo	(China) Gao Xinyu (Italy) Matilde Paoletti (Slovakia) Renáta Jamrichová (Portugal) Matilde Jorge
January 27	Porto Women's Indoor ITF 2 Porto, Portugal; Hard (i); W50; Singles and doubles draws	(Portugal) Francisca Jorge (Portugal) Matilde Jorge; 6–3, 6–2	(Croatia) Lucija Ćirić Bagarić (Slovenia) Kristina Novak	(Germany) Anna-Lena Friedsam (United States) Rasheeda McAdoo	(China) Gao Xinyu (Italy) Matilde Paoletti (Slovakia) Renáta Jamrichová (Portugal) Matilde Jorge
January 27	Glasgow, United Kingdom; Hard (i); W35; Singles and doubles draws	(Switzerland) Valentina Ryser; 7–5, 7–6^{(7–4)}	(Czech Republic) Nikola Bartůňková	(United States) Anna Rogers (Austria) Tamira Paszek	(Belgium) Clara Vlasselaer (Italy) Federica Urgesi (Germany) Antonia Schmidt (Sweden) Kajsa Rinaldo Persson
January 27	Glasgow, United Kingdom; Hard (i); W35; Singles and doubles draws	(United States) Paris Corley (France) Tiphanie Lemaître; 6–4, 5–7, [10–5]	(United Kingdom) Esther Adeshina (United Kingdom) Victoria Allen	(United States) Anna Rogers (Austria) Tamira Paszek	(Belgium) Clara Vlasselaer (Italy) Federica Urgesi (Germany) Antonia Schmidt (Sweden) Kajsa Rinaldo Persson
January 27	Antalya, Turkey; Clay; W15; Singles and doubles draws	(Germany) Joëlle Steur; 7–5, 6–1	(Italy) Martina Colmegna	(Japan) Yuki Naito (Germany) Mina Hodzic	(Bosnia and Herzegovina) Suana Tucaković (Netherlands) Antonia Stoyanov (Turkey) İlay Yörük (Italy) Francesca Pace
January 27	Antalya, Turkey; Clay; W15; Singles and doubles draws	(Chinese Taipei) Li Yu-yun (China) Li Zongyu; 6–4, 4–6, [11–9]	(Norway) Astrid Brune Olsen (Japan) Ena Koike	(Japan) Yuki Naito (Germany) Mina Hodzic	(Bosnia and Herzegovina) Suana Tucaković (Netherlands) Antonia Stoyanov (Turkey) İlay Yörük (Italy) Francesca Pace
January 27	Monastir, Tunisia; Hard; W15; Singles and doubles draws	(Japan) Hiromi Abe; 6–0, 6–0	(Greece) Martha Matoula	(United States) Alexis Blokhina (France) Jenny Lim	(Japan) Mayuka Aikawa (Serbia) Elena Milovanović (United States) Sara Daavettila (Portugal) Inês Murta
January 27	Monastir, Tunisia; Hard; W15; Singles and doubles draws	(Japan) Hiromi Abe (Japan) Mayuka Aikawa; 6–3, 6–0	(China) Guo Meiqi (China) Xiao Zhenghua	(United States) Alexis Blokhina (France) Jenny Lim	(Japan) Mayuka Aikawa (Serbia) Elena Milovanović (United States) Sara Daavettila (Portugal) Inês Murta
January 27	Sharm El Sheikh, Egypt; Hard; W15; Singles and doubles draws	(Czech Republic) Anna Sisková; 6–2, 7–5	(United States) Carol Young Suh Lee	(Netherlands) Joy de Zeeuw (Latvia) Beatrise Zeltiņa	(Austria) Alexandra Zimmer; Varvara Panshina; Daria Khomutsianskaya (China) Zhu Chenting
January 27	Sharm El Sheikh, Egypt; Hard; W15; Singles and doubles draws	Daria Khomutsianskaya; Varvara Panshina; 7–5, 6–4	(Netherlands) Joy de Zeeuw (Netherlands) Britt du Pree	(Netherlands) Joy de Zeeuw (Latvia) Beatrise Zeltiņa	(Austria) Alexandra Zimmer; Varvara Panshina; Daria Khomutsianskaya (China) Zhu Chenting

=== February ===
Week of	Tournament	Winner	Runners-up	Semifinalists	Quarterfinalists
February 3	Brisbane QTC Tennis International; Brisbane, Australia; Hard; W75; Singles and doubles draws	(Australia) Kimberly Birrell; 6–2, 4–6, 7–6^{(7–2)}	(Australia) Maddison Inglis	(Australia) Taylah Preston (Australia) Astra Sharma	(China) Zheng Wushuang (Australia) Lizette Cabrera (Australia) Priscilla Hon (Japan) Sayaka Ishii
February 3	Brisbane QTC Tennis International; Brisbane, Australia; Hard; W75; Singles and doubles draws	(Japan) Miho Kuramochi (China) Zheng Wushuang; 7–6^{(8–6)}, 6–3	(France) Tessah Andrianjafitrimo (Norway) Malene Helgø	(Australia) Taylah Preston (Australia) Astra Sharma	(China) Zheng Wushuang (Australia) Lizette Cabrera (Australia) Priscilla Hon (Japan) Sayaka Ishii
February 3	Leszno, Poland; Hard (i); W75; Singles and doubles draws	(France) Elsa Jacquemot; 6–4, 6–1	(China) Gao Xinyu	(France) Amandine Hesse (Slovenia) Veronika Erjavec	(Lithuania) Justina Mikulskytė (Switzerland) Céline Naef (Poland) Urszula Radwańska; Jana Kolodynska
February 3	Leszno, Poland; Hard (i); W75; Singles and doubles draws	(Czech Republic) Ivana Šebestová (Hong Kong) Cody Wong; 6–4, 1–6, [10–4]	(Poland) Weronika Falkowska (Poland) Martyna Kubka	(France) Amandine Hesse (Slovenia) Veronika Erjavec	(Lithuania) Justina Mikulskytė (Switzerland) Céline Naef (Poland) Urszula Radwańska; Jana Kolodynska
February 3	Herrenschwanden, Switzerland; Carpet (i); W35; Singles and doubles draws	(United States) Anna Rogers; 6–3, 3–6, 6–3	(Georgia (country)) Mariam Bolkvadze	(Chinese Taipei) Joanna Garland (United States) Elvina Kalieva	(Germany) Antonia Schmidt (Austria) Sinja Kraus (Slovakia) Viktória Hrunčáková (Poland) Linda Klimovičová
February 3	Herrenschwanden, Switzerland; Carpet (i); W35; Singles and doubles draws	Ekaterina Ovcharenko (United Kingdom) Emily Webley-Smith; 7–6^{(7–1)}, 2–6, [11–9]	(Georgia (country)) Mariam Bolkvadze (Austria) Sinja Kraus	(Chinese Taipei) Joanna Garland (United States) Elvina Kalieva	(Germany) Antonia Schmidt (Austria) Sinja Kraus (Slovakia) Viktória Hrunčáková (Poland) Linda Klimovičová
February 3	Antalya, Turkey; Clay; W35; Singles and doubles draws	Alisa Oktiabreva; 3–6, 6–3, 6–4	Anastasia Gasanova	(Hungary) Amarissa Tóth (Germany) Joëlle Steur	(Brazil) Carolina Alves (Switzerland) Ylena In-Albon (Romania) Cristina Dinu (Bulgaria) Denislava Glushkova
February 3	Antalya, Turkey; Clay; W35; Singles and doubles draws	(Chinese Taipei) Li Yu-yun (China) Li Zongyu; 6–3, 6–3	(Thailand) Punnin Kovapitukted (Japan) Yuki Naito	(Hungary) Amarissa Tóth (Germany) Joëlle Steur	(Brazil) Carolina Alves (Switzerland) Ylena In-Albon (Romania) Cristina Dinu (Bulgaria) Denislava Glushkova
February 3	Sharm El Sheikh, Egypt; Hard; W15; Singles and doubles draws	(Slovakia) Katarína Kužmová; 6–7^{(3–7)}, 6–3, 6–4	(United States) Carolyn Ansari	(Ukraine) Kateryna Lazarenko; Varvara Panshina	(Georgia (country)) Zoziya Kardava (Japan) Nana Kawagishi (Netherlands) Britt Du Pree (Egypt) Yasmin Ezzat
February 3	Sharm El Sheikh, Egypt; Hard; W15; Singles and doubles draws	Daria Khomutsianskaya; Varvara Panshina; 6–2, 7–5	(Bulgaria) Julia Stamatova (Germany) Anja Wildgruber	(Ukraine) Kateryna Lazarenko; Varvara Panshina	(Georgia (country)) Zoziya Kardava (Japan) Nana Kawagishi (Netherlands) Britt Du Pree (Egypt) Yasmin Ezzat
February 3	Monastir, Tunisia; Hard; W15; Singles and doubles draws	(United States) Sara Daavettila; 7–5, 4–3 ret.	(United States) Alexis Blokhina	(France) Yasmine Mansouri (China) Guo Meiqi	(Greece) Martha Matoula (Greece) Valentini Grammatikopoulou (Germany) Luisa Meyer auf der Heide (South Korea) Cherry Kim
February 3	Monastir, Tunisia; Hard; W15; Singles and doubles draws	(China) Guo Meiqi (China) Xiao Zhenghua; 4–6, 7–6^{(7–5)}, [10–8]	(United States) Sara Daavettila (Greece) Martha Matoula	(France) Yasmine Mansouri (China) Guo Meiqi	(Greece) Martha Matoula (Greece) Valentini Grammatikopoulou (Germany) Luisa Meyer auf der Heide (South Korea) Cherry Kim
February 10	AK Ladies Open; Altenkirchen, Germany; Carpet (i); W75; Singles and doubles draws	Julia Avdeeva; 6–3, 6–3	(Ukraine) Daria Snigur	(Germany) Tamara Korpatsch (Germany) Anna-Lena Friedsam	(Switzerland) Valentina Ryser (Switzerland) Susan Bandecchi (United States) Elvina Kalieva (Netherlands) Lian Tran
February 10	AK Ladies Open; Altenkirchen, Germany; Carpet (i); W75; Singles and doubles draws	(Belgium) Marie Benoît (Slovenia) Dalila Jakupović; 7–5, 7–6^{(8–6)}	(United Kingdom) Emily Appleton (Netherlands) Isabelle Haverlag	(Germany) Tamara Korpatsch (Germany) Anna-Lena Friedsam	(Switzerland) Valentina Ryser (Switzerland) Susan Bandecchi (United States) Elvina Kalieva (Netherlands) Lian Tran
February 10	Birmingham, Great Britain; Hard (i); W50; Singles and doubles draws	(United States) Clervie Ngounoue; 4–6, 6–2, 6–3	(Slovakia) Viktória Hrunčáková	(United Kingdom) Lily Miyazaki (France) Manon Léonard	(Italy) Lucrezia Stefanini (Serbia) Aleksandra Krunić (Sweden) Kajsa Rinaldo Persson (United States) Anna Rogers
February 10	Birmingham, Great Britain; Hard (i); W50; Singles and doubles draws	(Portugal) Francisca Jorge (Portugal) Matilde Jorge; 6–2, 4–6, [10–5]	(Slovakia) Viktória Hrunčáková (Poland) Alicja Rosolska	(United Kingdom) Lily Miyazaki (France) Manon Léonard	(Italy) Lucrezia Stefanini (Serbia) Aleksandra Krunić (Sweden) Kajsa Rinaldo Persson (United States) Anna Rogers
February 10	Timaru, New Zealand; Hard; W35; Singles and doubles draws	(Switzerland) Leonie Küng; 6–1, 6–2	(United Kingdom) Naiktha Bains	(Norway) Malene Helgø (China) Shi Han	(Japan) Miho Kuramochi (France) Tessah Andrianjafitrimo (Japan) Shiho Akita (South Korea) Choi On-yu
February 10	Timaru, New Zealand; Hard; W35; Singles and doubles draws	(South Korea) Back Da-yeon (South Korea) Lee Eun-hye; 7–5, 6–3	(South Korea) Choi On-yu (Japan) Nanari Katsumi	(Norway) Malene Helgø (China) Shi Han	(Japan) Miho Kuramochi (France) Tessah Andrianjafitrimo (Japan) Shiho Akita (South Korea) Choi On-yu
February 10	Antalya, Turkey; Clay; W35; Singles and doubles draws	(Spain) Ángela Fita Boluda; 6–3, 6–4	(Slovakia) Nina Vargová	(Hungary) Amarissa Tóth (Romania) Irina Bara	(Germany) Eva Marie Voracek (Croatia) Tena Lukas (Czech Republic) Alena Kovačková (Switzerland) Ylena In-Albon
February 10	Antalya, Turkey; Clay; W35; Singles and doubles draws	(Chinese Taipei) Li Yu-yun (China) Li Zongyu; 6–2, 2–6, [10–6]	(Italy) Nicole Fossa Huergo (Kazakhstan) Zhibek Kulambayeva	(Hungary) Amarissa Tóth (Romania) Irina Bara	(Germany) Eva Marie Voracek (Croatia) Tena Lukas (Czech Republic) Alena Kovačková (Switzerland) Ylena In-Albon
February 10	Manacor, Spain; Hard; W15; Singles and doubles draws	(Bulgaria) Elizara Yaneva; 5–1 ret.	(France) Astrid Lew Yan Foon	(Denmark) Johanne Svendsen (Romania) Irina Fetecău	(Spain) Noelia Bouzó Zanotti (Netherlands) Jasmijn Gimbrère (Slovakia) Sofia Milátová (France) Alice Robbe
February 10	Manacor, Spain; Hard; W15; Singles and doubles draws	(Netherlands) Merel Hoedt (France) Alice Robbe; 7–6^{(7–3)}, 6–2	(China) Tian Jialin (Italy) Laura Mair	(Denmark) Johanne Svendsen (Romania) Irina Fetecău	(Spain) Noelia Bouzó Zanotti (Netherlands) Jasmijn Gimbrère (Slovakia) Sofia Milátová (France) Alice Robbe
February 10	Sharm El Sheikh, Egypt; Hard; W15; Singles and doubles draws	(Czech Republic) Anna Sisková; 6–1, 6–3	(United States) Carolyn Ansari	(United States) Carol Young Suh Lee; Daria Zelinskaya	(Italy) Gaia Squarcialupi (Japan) Ayumi Miyamoto (Georgia (country)) Sofia Shapatava (Bulgaria) Iva Ivanova
February 10	Sharm El Sheikh, Egypt; Hard; W15; Singles and doubles draws	(United States) Carolyn Ansari (Japan) Ayumi Miyamoto; 5–7, 6–4, [10–6]	(Egypt) Yasmine Ezzat (Italy) Gaia Squarcialupi	(United States) Carol Young Suh Lee; Daria Zelinskaya	(Italy) Gaia Squarcialupi (Japan) Ayumi Miyamoto (Georgia (country)) Sofia Shapatava (Bulgaria) Iva Ivanova
February 10	Monastir, Tunisia; Hard; W15; Singles and doubles draws	(Czech Republic) Eliška Ticháčková; 2–6, 6–3, 7–5	(France) Tiphanie Lemaître	(United States) Sara Daavettila (France) Marie Villet	(France) Yasmine Mansouri (China) Guo Meiqi (France) Nina Radovanovic (Italy) Viola Turini
February 10	Monastir, Tunisia; Hard; W15; Singles and doubles draws	(France) Yasmine Mansouri (Serbia) Elena Milovanović; 6–2, 6–0	(India) Diva Bhatia (Greece) Sapfo Sakellaridi	(United States) Sara Daavettila (France) Marie Villet	(France) Yasmine Mansouri (China) Guo Meiqi (France) Nina Radovanovic (Italy) Viola Turini
February 17	Winter Prague Open; Prague, Czechia; Hard (i); W75; Singles and doubles draws	(Czech Republic) Gabriela Knutson; 6–4, 3–6, 7–5	(Australia) Destanee Aiava	(Australia) Priscilla Hon (Germany) Ella Seidel	(Switzerland) Céline Naef (Serbia) Lola Radivojević (Czech Republic) Nikola Bartůňková (Czech Republic) Tereza Valentová
February 17	Winter Prague Open; Prague, Czechia; Hard (i); W75; Singles and doubles draws	(Czech Republic) Jesika Malečková (Czech Republic) Miriam Škoch; 6–0, 6–2	(Australia) Priscilla Hon (Switzerland) Rebeka Masarova	(Australia) Priscilla Hon (Germany) Ella Seidel	(Switzerland) Céline Naef (Serbia) Lola Radivojević (Czech Republic) Nikola Bartůňková (Czech Republic) Tereza Valentová
February 17	Spring, United States; Hard; W50; Singles and doubles draws	(United States) Mary Stoiana vs (United States) Iva Jovic; Final was not played due to poor weather		(Canada) Carol Zhao (United States) Caty McNally	(Australia) Taylah Preston (United States) Whitney Osuigwe (United States) Maria Mateas (United States) Eryn Cayetano
February 17	Spring, United States; Hard; W50; Singles and doubles draws	Doubles competition was cancelled due to ongoing poor weather		(Canada) Carol Zhao (United States) Caty McNally	(Australia) Taylah Preston (United States) Whitney Osuigwe (United States) Maria Mateas (United States) Eryn Cayetano
February 17	Burnie International; Burnie, Australia; Hard; W35; Singles and doubles draws	(France) Tessah Andrianjafitrimo; 6–2, 6–3	(China) Guo Hanyu	(Australia) Jaimee Fourlis (China) Yuan Chengyiyi	(Japan) Ayumi Koshiishi (Japan) Miho Kuramochi (Japan) Shiho Akita (Japan) Sakura Hosogi
February 17	Burnie International; Burnie, Australia; Hard; W35; Singles and doubles draws	(New Zealand) Monique Barry (Australia) Elena Micic; 6–3, 6–4	(Australia) Gabriella Da Silva-Fick (Australia) Belle Thompson	(Australia) Jaimee Fourlis (China) Yuan Chengyiyi	(Japan) Ayumi Koshiishi (Japan) Miho Kuramochi (Japan) Shiho Akita (Japan) Sakura Hosogi
February 17	Manchester, Great Britain; Hard (i); W35; Singles and doubles draws	(Canada) Victoria Mboko; 7–6^{(7–0)}, 6–2	(France) Manon Léonard	(France) Tiantsoa Sarah Rakotomanga Rajaonah (China) Lu Jiajing	(United Kingdom) Emily Appleton (Spain) Guiomar Maristany (France) Julie Belgraver (Belgium) Sofia Costoulas
February 17	Manchester, Great Britain; Hard (i); W35; Singles and doubles draws	(Canada) Ariana Arseneault (United States) Anna Rogers; 6–7^{(5–7)}, 6–1, [10–8]	(Poland) Weronika Falkowska (Poland) Martyna Kubka	(France) Tiantsoa Sarah Rakotomanga Rajaonah (China) Lu Jiajing	(United Kingdom) Emily Appleton (Spain) Guiomar Maristany (France) Julie Belgraver (Belgium) Sofia Costoulas
February 17	Wiphold International; Pretoria, South Africa; Hard; W15; Singles and doubles draws	(Switzerland) Jenny Dürst; 6–1, 6–3	(Netherlands) Stéphanie Visscher	(France) Astrid Cirotte (United States) Gabriella Price	(United States) Sabastiani León; Polina Kaibekova (Zimbabwe) Valeria Bhunu (Poland) Anna Hertel
February 17	Wiphold International; Pretoria, South Africa; Hard; W15; Singles and doubles draws	(Netherlands) Rikke de Koning (Netherlands) Stéphanie Visscher; 7–6^{(7–4)}, 6–3	Arina Arifullina; Polina Kaibekova	(France) Astrid Cirotte (United States) Gabriella Price	(United States) Sabastiani León; Polina Kaibekova (Zimbabwe) Valeria Bhunu (Poland) Anna Hertel
February 17	Bucharest, Romania; Hard (i); W15; Singles and doubles draws	(Netherlands) Anouck Vrancken Peeters; 6–4, 1–6, 6–3	(Finland) Anastasia Kulikova	(Slovakia) Katarína Kužmová (Germany) Julia Stusek	(Bulgaria) Lidia Encheva (Slovakia) Katarína Strešnáková (Romania) Mara Gae (Germany) Anna Gabric
February 17	Bucharest, Romania; Hard (i); W15; Singles and doubles draws	(Hungary) Adrienn Nagy (Germany) Emily Seibold; 7–6^{(7–5)}, 6–1	(Slovakia) Katarína Strešnáková (France) Marine Szostak	(Slovakia) Katarína Kužmová (Germany) Julia Stusek	(Bulgaria) Lidia Encheva (Slovakia) Katarína Strešnáková (Romania) Mara Gae (Germany) Anna Gabric
February 17	Manacor, Spain; Hard; W15; Singles and doubles draws	(Bulgaria) Elizara Yaneva; 2–6, 6–4, 6–3	(Netherlands) Britt du Pree	(France) Alice Robbe (Italy) Anastasia Abbagnato	(Romania) Irina Fetecău (Spain) Noelia Bouzó Zanotti (United States) Ayana Akli (United States) Ellie Schoppe
February 17	Manacor, Spain; Hard; W15; Singles and doubles draws	(Netherlands) Loes Ebeling Koning (Netherlands) Sarah van Emst; 6–4, 4–6, [10–6]	(Italy) Anastasia Abbagnato (Luxembourg) Marie Weckerle	(France) Alice Robbe (Italy) Anastasia Abbagnato	(Romania) Irina Fetecău (Spain) Noelia Bouzó Zanotti (United States) Ayana Akli (United States) Ellie Schoppe
February 17	Antalya, Turkiye; Clay; W15; Singles and doubles draws	(Argentina) Luisina Giovannini; 6–1, 6–3	(Germany) Mina Hodzic	(Japan) Yuki Naito (Slovenia) Živa Falkner	(Egypt) Sandra Samir (Italy) Eleonora Alvisi (Romania) Georgia Crăciun (Italy) Alessandra Mazzola
February 17	Antalya, Turkiye; Clay; W15; Singles and doubles draws	(Italy) Vittoria Paganetti (Italy) Lisa Pigato; 6–3, 6–4	(Slovenia) Živa Falkner (Japan) Yuki Naito	(Japan) Yuki Naito (Slovenia) Živa Falkner	(Egypt) Sandra Samir (Italy) Eleonora Alvisi (Romania) Georgia Crăciun (Italy) Alessandra Mazzola
February 17	Sharm El Sheikh, Egypt; Hard; W15; Singles and doubles draws	(Bulgaria) Isabella Shinikova; 3–6, 6–0, 7–6^{(9–7)}	(Czech Republic) Jana Kovačková	(Egypt) Yasmin Ezzat (Austria) Tamara Kostic	Kristiana Sidorova (Bulgaria) Iva Ivanova (Italy) Gaia Squarcialupi (Austria) Ekaterina Perelygina
February 17	Sharm El Sheikh, Egypt; Hard; W15; Singles and doubles draws	(Japan) Ayumi Miyamoto (Japan) Kisa Yoshioka; 7–6^{(7–4)}, 6–2	(Japan) Mana Kawamura (Lithuania) Patricija Paukštytė	(Egypt) Yasmin Ezzat (Austria) Tamara Kostic	Kristiana Sidorova (Bulgaria) Iva Ivanova (Italy) Gaia Squarcialupi (Austria) Ekaterina Perelygina
February 17	Monastir, Tunisia; Hard; W15; Singles and doubles draws	(Italy) Camilla Zanolini; 6–4, 6–4	(Italy) Silvia Ambrosio	(France) Mathilde Lollia (Germany) Katharina Hobgarski	(France) Tiphanie Lemaître (France) Daphnée Mpetshi Perricard (Italy) Aurora Zantedeschi (France) Nina Radovanovic
February 17	Monastir, Tunisia; Hard; W15; Singles and doubles draws	(Italy) Silvia Ambrosio (Germany) Katharina Hobgarski; 6–3, 6–3	(Austria) Arabella Koller (Belgium) Eliessa Vanlangendonck	(France) Mathilde Lollia (Germany) Katharina Hobgarski	(France) Tiphanie Lemaître (France) Daphnée Mpetshi Perricard (Italy) Aurora Zantedeschi (France) Nina Radovanovic
February 24	Empire Women's Indoor; Trnava, Slovakia; Hard (i); W75; Singles and doubles draws	(Croatia) Antonia Ružić; 6–2, 4–6, 6–3	Elena Pridankina	(Switzerland) Céline Naef (Australia) Destanee Aiava	(Germany) Stephanie Wagner (Germany) Ella Seidel (Spain) Leyre Romero Gormaz (Poland) Linda Klimovičová
February 24	Empire Women's Indoor; Trnava, Slovakia; Hard (i); W75; Singles and doubles draws	(Czech Republic) Jesika Malečková (Czech Republic) Miriam Škoch; 5–7, 6–3, [10–2]	(Switzerland) Céline Naef; Elena Pridankina	(Switzerland) Céline Naef (Australia) Destanee Aiava	(Germany) Stephanie Wagner (Germany) Ella Seidel (Spain) Leyre Romero Gormaz (Poland) Linda Klimovičová
February 24	Mâcon, France; Hard (i); W50+H; Singles and doubles draws	(Austria) Sinja Kraus; 6–0, 7–5	(France) Tiantsoa Sarah Rakotomanga Rajaonah	(Spain) Andrea Lázaro García (France) Manon Léonard	(Italy) Lucrezia Stefanini (France) Harmony Tan (United Kingdom) Lily Miyazaki (Georgia (country)) Mariam Bolkvadze
February 24	Mâcon, France; Hard (i); W50+H; Singles and doubles draws	(Belgium) Magali Kempen (Lithuania) Justina Mikulskytė; 7–6^{(7–5)}, 6–2	(Germany) Tayisiya Morderger (Germany) Yana Morderger	(Spain) Andrea Lázaro García (France) Manon Léonard	(Italy) Lucrezia Stefanini (France) Harmony Tan (United Kingdom) Lily Miyazaki (Georgia (country)) Mariam Bolkvadze
February 24	Ahmedabad, India; Hard; W50; Singles and doubles draws	(South Korea) Park So-hyun; 6–3, 6–0	(Australia) Arina Rodionova	Mariia Tkacheva (India) Vaidehi Chaudhari	(France) Amandine Hesse; Anastasiia Gureva; Ekaterina Reyngold (Japan) Haruka Kaji
February 24	Ahmedabad, India; Hard; W50; Singles and doubles draws	(Japan) Akiko Omae (Japan) Ikumi Yamazaki; 6–2, 2–6, [10–7]	(India) Vaishnavi Adkar (India) Ankita Raina	Mariia Tkacheva (India) Vaidehi Chaudhari	(France) Amandine Hesse; Anastasiia Gureva; Ekaterina Reyngold (Japan) Haruka Kaji
February 24	Launceston Tennis International; Launceston, Australia; Hard; W35; Singles and doubles draws	(Australia) Lizette Cabrera; 7–5, 6–2	(Japan) Sakura Hosogi	(South Korea) Ku Yeon-woo (France) Tessah Andrianjafitrimo	(Australia) Gabriella Da Silva-Fick (South Korea) Back Da-yeon (China) Guo Hanyu (Japan) Ayumi Koshiishi
February 24	Launceston Tennis International; Launceston, Australia; Hard; W35; Singles and doubles draws	(New Zealand) Monique Barry (Australia) Elena Micic; 6–2, 6–4	(Japan) Miho Kuramochi (Japan) Erika Sema	(South Korea) Ku Yeon-woo (France) Tessah Andrianjafitrimo	(Australia) Gabriella Da Silva-Fick (South Korea) Back Da-yeon (China) Guo Hanyu (Japan) Ayumi Koshiishi
February 24	Antalya, Turkiye; Clay; W35; Singles and doubles draws	(Hungary) Amarissa Tóth; 6–3, 6–3	(Romania) Irina Bara	(Slovenia) Pia Lovrič (Italy) Lisa Pigato	(Germany) Chantal Sauvant (Croatia) Tena Lukas (Italy) Vittoria Paganetti (Argentina) Luisina Giovannini
February 24	Antalya, Turkiye; Clay; W35; Singles and doubles draws	(Chinese Taipei) Li Yu-yun (China) Li Zongyu; 6–3, 6–4	Amina Anshba (Japan) Yuki Naito	(Slovenia) Pia Lovrič (Italy) Lisa Pigato	(Germany) Chantal Sauvant (Croatia) Tena Lukas (Italy) Vittoria Paganetti (Argentina) Luisina Giovannini
February 24	Arcadia Women's Pro Open; Arcadia, United States; Hard; W35; Singles and doubles draws	(Canada) Kayla Cross; 6–2, 7–6^{(8–6)}	(United States) Iva Jovic	(United States) Kylie McKenzie (United States) Fiona Crawley	(United States) Maria Mateas (Greece) Despina Papamichail (Poland) Stefania Rogozińska Dzik (Canada) Carson Branstine
February 24	Arcadia Women's Pro Open; Arcadia, United States; Hard; W35; Singles and doubles draws	(United States) Victoria Osuigwe (United States) Alana Smith; 6–3, 6–4	(Indonesia) Aldila Sutjiadi (Indonesia) Janice Tjen	(United States) Kylie McKenzie (United States) Fiona Crawley	(United States) Maria Mateas (Greece) Despina Papamichail (Poland) Stefania Rogozińska Dzik (Canada) Carson Branstine
February 24	Maanshan, China; Hard (i); W15; Singles and doubles draws	Daria Egorova; 7–6^{(7–3)}, 6–4	(Japan) Hayu Kinoshita	(China) Yang Yidi; Ekaterina Shalimova	(China) Anna Yang (Hong Kong) Wu Ho-ching (Slovakia) Viktória Morvayová (Thailand) Punnin Kovapitukted
February 24	Maanshan, China; Hard (i); W15; Singles and doubles draws	Daria Egorova; Ekaterina Shalimova; 6–2, 7–5	(South Korea) Kim Na-ri (China) Ye Qiuyu	(China) Yang Yidi; Ekaterina Shalimova	(China) Anna Yang (Hong Kong) Wu Ho-ching (Slovakia) Viktória Morvayová (Thailand) Punnin Kovapitukted
February 24	Manacor, Spain; Hard; W15; Singles and doubles draws	(Belgium) Jeline Vandromme; 6–2, 6–3	(Netherlands) Britt du Pree	(United States) Monika Ekstrand (Germany) Tessa Johanna Brockmann	(United States) Ayana Akli (United Kingdom) Danielle Daley (Netherlands) Loes Ebeling Koning (United Kingdom) Alice Gillan
February 24	Manacor, Spain; Hard; W15; Singles and doubles draws	(Netherlands) Isis Louise van den Broek (Netherlands) Sarah van Emst; 6–4, 6–4	(Netherlands) Jasmijn Gimbrère (France) Alice Robbe	(United States) Monika Ekstrand (Germany) Tessa Johanna Brockmann	(United States) Ayana Akli (United Kingdom) Danielle Daley (Netherlands) Loes Ebeling Koning (United Kingdom) Alice Gillan
February 24	Leimen, Germany; Hard (i); W15; Singles and doubles draws	(Poland) Martyna Kubka; 6–4, 7–6^{(7–5)}	(Finland) Anastasia Kulikova	Ekaterina Kazionova (Ukraine) Veronika Podrez	(Germany) Valentina Steiner (Germany) Sonja Zhenikhova (Germany) Josy Daems (Serbia) Teodora Kostović
February 24	Leimen, Germany; Hard (i); W15; Singles and doubles draws	(Czech Republic) Nikola Břečková (Czech Republic) Karolína Vlčková; 6–4, 0–6, [10–8]	(Romania) Ștefania Bojică (Germany) Marie Vogt	Ekaterina Kazionova (Ukraine) Veronika Podrez	(Germany) Valentina Steiner (Germany) Sonja Zhenikhova (Germany) Josy Daems (Serbia) Teodora Kostović
February 24	Wiphold International; Pretoria, South Africa; Hard; W15; Singles and doubles draws	(Netherlands) Stéphanie Visscher; 5–7, 6–1, 7–6^{(7–5)}	(Switzerland) Jenny Dürst	(France) Astrid Cirotte (Zimbabwe) Valeria Bhunu	(United Kingdom) Marelie Raath (United States) Gabriella Price; Alexandra Vasilyeva (Poland) Anna Hertel
February 24	Wiphold International; Pretoria, South Africa; Hard; W15; Singles and doubles draws	(Netherlands) Coco Bosman (Italy) Maddalena Giordano; Walkover	(Germany) Vivien Sandberg (Netherlands) Emma van Poppel	(France) Astrid Cirotte (Zimbabwe) Valeria Bhunu	(United Kingdom) Marelie Raath (United States) Gabriella Price; Alexandra Vasilyeva (Poland) Anna Hertel
February 24	Sharm El Sheikh, Egypt; Hard; W15; Singles and doubles draws	(Bulgaria) Isabella Shinikova; 6–4, 3–6, 6–3	(China) Zhu Chenting	(Egypt) Yasmin Ezzat (Lithuania) Patricija Paukštytė	(Austria) Ekaterina Perelygina (Japan) Remika Ohashi (Romania) Elena-Teodora Cadar (Georgia (country)) Sofia Shapatava
February 24	Sharm El Sheikh, Egypt; Hard; W15; Singles and doubles draws	(Japan) Remika Ohashi (Japan) Kisa Yoshioka; 6–3, 6–1	(Netherlands) Madelief Hageman (Lithuania) Patricija Paukštytė	(Egypt) Yasmin Ezzat (Lithuania) Patricija Paukštytė	(Austria) Ekaterina Perelygina (Japan) Remika Ohashi (Romania) Elena-Teodora Cadar (Georgia (country)) Sofia Shapatava
February 24	Monastir, Tunisia; Hard; W15; Singles and doubles draws	(Italy) Silvia Ambrosio; 6–4, 6–1	(Italy) Aurora Zantedeschi	(Serbia) Elena Milovanović (Latvia) Beatrise Zeltiņa	(Italy) Matilde Mariani (France) Guilia Morlet (Italy) Camilla Gennaro (Germany) Katharina Hobgarski
February 24	Monastir, Tunisia; Hard; W15; Singles and doubles draws	(Italy) Silvia Ambrosio (Germany) Katharina Hobgarski; 6–4, 6–7^{(4–7)}, [10–4]	(United States) Julia Adams (United States) Lilian Poling	(Serbia) Elena Milovanović (Latvia) Beatrise Zeltiņa	(Italy) Matilde Mariani (France) Guilia Morlet (Italy) Camilla Gennaro (Germany) Katharina Hobgarski

=== March ===
Week of	Tournament	Winner	Runners-up	Semifinalists	Quarterfinalists
March 3	Empire Women's Indoor; Trnava, Slovakia; Hard (i); W75; Singles and doubles draws	(Switzerland) Valentina Ryser; 6–4, 3–6, 7–6^{(7–4)}	(Czech Republic) Tereza Valentová	(Croatia) Antonia Ružić (Japan) Sayaka Ishii	(Czech Republic) Linda Fruhvirtová (Australia) Talia Gibson (Hungary) Dalma Gálfi (Slovakia) Renáta Jamrichová
March 3	Empire Women's Indoor; Trnava, Slovakia; Hard (i); W75; Singles and doubles draws	(Netherlands) Isabelle Haverlag; Elena Pridankina; 6–2, 6–3	(Belgium) Magali Kempen (France) Jessika Ponchet	(Croatia) Antonia Ružić (Japan) Sayaka Ishii	(Czech Republic) Linda Fruhvirtová (Australia) Talia Gibson (Hungary) Dalma Gálfi (Slovakia) Renáta Jamrichová
March 3	Porto Women's Indoor ITF 3 Porto, Portugal; Hard (i); W75; Singles and doubles draws	(Canada) Victoria Mboko; 6–1, 6–1	(United Kingdom) Harriet Dart	(United States) Louisa Chirico (Netherlands) Anouk Koevermans	(France) Émeline Dartron (Italy) Lucrezia Stefanini (Spain) Guiomar Maristany (United States) Karina Miller
March 3	Porto Women's Indoor ITF 3 Porto, Portugal; Hard (i); W75; Singles and doubles draws	(Portugal) Francisca Jorge (Portugal) Matilde Jorge; 0–6, 7–6^{(7–4)}, [10–8]	(Chinese Taipei) Cho I-hsuan (Chinese Taipei) Cho Yi-tsen	(United States) Louisa Chirico (Netherlands) Anouk Koevermans	(France) Émeline Dartron (Italy) Lucrezia Stefanini (Spain) Guiomar Maristany (United States) Karina Miller
March 3	Chihuahua, Mexico; Clay; W50; Singles and doubles draws	(Ukraine) Valeriya Strakhova; 5–7, 6–2, 6–4	(Brazil) Carolina Alves	(Greece) Despina Papamichail (Mexico) Ana Sofía Sánchez	(United States) Robin Anderson (Greece) Dimitra Pavlou (United States) Elizabeth Mandlik (Argentina) Jazmin Ortenzi
March 3	Chihuahua, Mexico; Clay; W50; Singles and doubles draws	(United States) Jessie Aney (United States) Jessica Failla; 6–3, 7–5	(Greece) Eleni Christofi (Greece) Despina Papamichail	(Greece) Despina Papamichail (Mexico) Ana Sofía Sánchez	(United States) Robin Anderson (Greece) Dimitra Pavlou (United States) Elizabeth Mandlik (Argentina) Jazmin Ortenzi
March 3	Gurugram, India; Hard; W35; Singles and doubles draws	Kristina Dmitruk; 6–3, 6–2	Ekaterina Makarova	(Japan) Ikumi Yamazaki (Germany) Antonia Schmidt	(India) Vaidehi Chaudhari (Japan) Haruka Kaji; Polina Iatcenko (India) Zeel Desai
March 3	Gurugram, India; Hard; W35; Singles and doubles draws	Ekaterina Makarova; Ekaterina Reyngold; 2–6, 6–4, [10–7]	Polina Iatcenko; Mariia Tkacheva	(Japan) Ikumi Yamazaki (Germany) Antonia Schmidt	(India) Vaidehi Chaudhari (Japan) Haruka Kaji; Polina Iatcenko (India) Zeel Desai
March 3	Helsinki, Finland; Hard (i); W35; Singles and doubles draws	(Belgium) Sofia Costoulas; 6–3, 7–5	(United Kingdom) Lily Miyazaki	(Malta) Francesca Curmi (Norway) Malene Helgø	(France) Fiona Ferro (France) Amandine Monnot (France) Julie Belgraver (Spain) Marina Bassols Ribera
March 3	Helsinki, Finland; Hard (i); W35; Singles and doubles draws	(Finland) Laura Hietaranta (United Kingdom) Ella McDonald; 6–3, 6–4	(Turkey) Ayla Aksu (Poland) Martyna Kubka	(Malta) Francesca Curmi (Norway) Malene Helgø	(France) Fiona Ferro (France) Amandine Monnot (France) Julie Belgraver (Spain) Marina Bassols Ribera
March 3	Solarino, Italy; Carpet; W35; Singles and doubles draws	(Chinese Taipei) Joanna Garland; 6–1, 6–2	(Poland) Weronika Falkowska	(Czech Republic) Vendula Valdmannová (Italy) Camilla Zanolini	(Italy) Federica Urgesi (Italy) Jessica Pieri (Italy) Anastasia Abbagnato (Italy) Federica Di Sarra
March 3	Solarino, Italy; Carpet; W35; Singles and doubles draws	(United States) Paris Corley (Poland) Weronika Falkowska; 6–1, 6–1	(Greece) Valentini Grammatikopoulou; Yuliya Hatouka	(Czech Republic) Vendula Valdmannová (Italy) Camilla Zanolini	(Italy) Federica Urgesi (Italy) Jessica Pieri (Italy) Anastasia Abbagnato (Italy) Federica Di Sarra
March 3	Maanshan, China; Hard (i); W15; Singles and doubles draws	Daria Egorova; 6–2, 6–1	(China) Ye Qiuyu	Ekaterina Shalimova (Slovakia) Viktória Morvayová	(Hong Kong) Wu Ho-ching (South Korea) Kim Na-ri; Elina Nepliy (Japan) Hayu Kinoshita
March 3	Maanshan, China; Hard (i); W15; Singles and doubles draws	(South Korea) Kim Na-ri (China) Ye Qiuyu; 6–4, 6–1	(China) Lu Jingjing (China) Xun Fangying	Ekaterina Shalimova (Slovakia) Viktória Morvayová	(Hong Kong) Wu Ho-ching (South Korea) Kim Na-ri; Elina Nepliy (Japan) Hayu Kinoshita
March 3	Hagetmau, France; Hard (i); W15; Singles and doubles draws	(Ukraine) Veronika Podrez; 6–4, 6–2	(France) Alice Robbe	(France) Emma Léné (Denmark) Olga Helmi	Kristina Kroitor (United States) Ayana Akli (Bulgaria) Lidia Encheva (Italy) Carlotta Moccia
March 3	Hagetmau, France; Hard (i); W15; Singles and doubles draws	(France) Sarah Iliev (France) Emma Léné; 7–6^{(7–2)}, 3–6, [10–8]	(United States) Ayana Akli (United States) Mia Horvit	(France) Emma Léné (Denmark) Olga Helmi	Kristina Kroitor (United States) Ayana Akli (Bulgaria) Lidia Encheva (Italy) Carlotta Moccia
March 3	Antalya, Turkiye; Clay; W15; Singles and doubles draws	(Germany) Joëlle Steur; 6–4, 6–4	(Italy) Jessica Bertoldo	(France) Alice Ramé (Latvia) Adelina Lachinova	(Czech Republic) Linda Ševčíková (Serbia) Anja Stanković (Italy) Martina Colmegna (Romania) Ștefania Bojică
March 3	Antalya, Turkiye; Clay; W15; Singles and doubles draws	(Germany) Chantal Sauvant (Serbia) Anja Stanković; 6–2, 6–4	(Poland) Daria Kuczer (Germany) Joëlle Steur	(France) Alice Ramé (Latvia) Adelina Lachinova	(Czech Republic) Linda Ševčíková (Serbia) Anja Stanković (Italy) Martina Colmegna (Romania) Ștefania Bojică
March 3	Sharm El Sheikh, Egypt; Hard; W15; Singles and doubles draws	(Czech Republic) Anna Sisková; 6–0, 6–3	(Romania) Elena-Teodora Cadar	(Bulgaria) Isabella Shinikova (Georgia (country)) Sofia Shapatava	(Italy) Barbara Dessolis; Evgeniya Burdina (Italy) Clarissa Gai (Lithuania) Iveta Dapkutė
March 3	Sharm El Sheikh, Egypt; Hard; W15; Singles and doubles draws	Arina Arifullina; Evgeniya Burdina; 7–6^{(7–4)}, 1–6, [10–8]	(Portugal) Inês Murta (Germany) Franziska Sziedat	(Bulgaria) Isabella Shinikova (Georgia (country)) Sofia Shapatava	(Italy) Barbara Dessolis; Evgeniya Burdina (Italy) Clarissa Gai (Lithuania) Iveta Dapkutė
March 3	Monastir, Tunisia; Hard; W15; Singles and doubles draws	(Spain) Eva Guerrero Álvarez; 7–6^{(10–8)}, 6–0	(United States) Julia Adams	(United States) Eryn Cayetano (Belgium) Vicky Van de Peer	(Greece) Sapfo Sakellaridi (Latvia) Beatrise Zeltiņa (Austria) Liel Marlies Rothensteiner (Belgium) Tamila Gadamauri
March 3	Monastir, Tunisia; Hard; W15; Singles and doubles draws	(Lithuania) Andrė Lukošiūtė (Germany) Luisa Meyer auf der Heide; 7–5, 6–2	(United States) Eryn Cayetano (United States) Salma Ewing	(United States) Eryn Cayetano (Belgium) Vicky Van de Peer	(Greece) Sapfo Sakellaridi (Latvia) Beatrise Zeltiņa (Austria) Liel Marlies Rothensteiner (Belgium) Tamila Gadamauri
March 3	Trois-Rivières, Canada; Hard (i); W15; Singles and doubles draws	(United Kingdom) Emily Appleton; 6–3, 3–6, 6–3	(United States) Malaika Rapolu	(New Zealand) Valentina Ivanov (United States) Amy Zhu	(United States) Fiona Crawley (Canada) Clémence Mercier (Slovenia) Lara Smejkal (United States) Dasha Ivanova
March 3	Trois-Rivières, Canada; Hard (i); W15; Singles and doubles draws	(United States) Elizabeth Ionescu (United States) Christasha McNeil; 6–2, 2–6, [10–2]	(United States) Dasha Ivanova (United States) Amy Zhu	(New Zealand) Valentina Ivanov (United States) Amy Zhu	(United States) Fiona Crawley (Canada) Clémence Mercier (Slovenia) Lara Smejkal (United States) Dasha Ivanova
March 10	Székesfehérvár Open; Székesfehérvár, Hungary; Clay (i); W75; Singles and doubles draws	(Austria) Sinja Kraus; 2–6, 7–5, 6–3	(Hungary) Amarissa Tóth	(Ukraine) Anastasiia Sobolieva (Switzerland) Simona Waltert	(Czech Republic) Sára Bejlek (Kazakhstan) Zhibek Kulambayeva (Romania) Miriam Bulgaru (France) Chloé Paquet
March 10	Székesfehérvár Open; Székesfehérvár, Hungary; Clay (i); W75; Singles and doubles draws	(Romania) Irina Bara (Georgia (country)) Ekaterine Gorgodze; 6–7^{(7–9)}, 6–3, [10–3]	(Hungary) Luca Udvardy (Hungary) Panna Udvardy	(Ukraine) Anastasiia Sobolieva (Switzerland) Simona Waltert	(Czech Republic) Sára Bejlek (Kazakhstan) Zhibek Kulambayeva (Romania) Miriam Bulgaru (France) Chloé Paquet
March 10	Târgu Mureș, Romania; Hard (i); W75; Singles and doubles draws	(Australia) Priscilla Hon; 6–3, 6–4	(Netherlands) Arianne Hartono	(Liechtenstein) Kathinka von Deichmann (Serbia) Nina Stojanović	(Italy) Camilla Rosatello (United Kingdom) Lily Miyazaki (Japan) Mai Hontama; Julia Avdeeva
March 10	Târgu Mureș, Romania; Hard (i); W75; Singles and doubles draws	(Italy) Camilla Rosatello (Serbia) Nina Stojanović; 7–6^{(7–1)}, 6–2	(United Kingdom) Madeleine Brooks (Lithuania) Justina Mikulskytė	(Liechtenstein) Kathinka von Deichmann (Serbia) Nina Stojanović	(Italy) Camilla Rosatello (United Kingdom) Lily Miyazaki (Japan) Mai Hontama; Julia Avdeeva
March 10	Shimadzu All Japan Indoor Tennis Championships; Kyoto, Japan; Hard (i); W50; Singles and doubles draws	(Japan) Sara Saito; 6–4, 7–6^{(7–2)}	(Japan) Himeno Sakatsume	(Japan) Ayano Shimizu (Australia) Emerson Jones	(United Kingdom) Mingge Xu (China) Zhang Ying (Chinese Taipei) Liang En-shuo (Japan) Akiko Omae
March 10	Shimadzu All Japan Indoor Tennis Championships; Kyoto, Japan; Hard (i); W50; Singles and doubles draws	(Japan) Saki Imamura (South Korea) Park So-hyun; 7–5, 6–4	(Japan) Momoko Kobori (Japan) Ayano Shimizu	(Japan) Ayano Shimizu (Australia) Emerson Jones	(United Kingdom) Mingge Xu (China) Zhang Ying (Chinese Taipei) Liang En-shuo (Japan) Akiko Omae
March 10	Shenzhen, China; Hard; W50; Singles and doubles draws	(China) Guo Hanyu; 6–4, 7–5	(China) You Xiaodi	(Thailand) Lanlana Tararudee (China) Li Zongyu	Kristina Dmitruk (United States) Hina Inoue (Australia) Arina Rodionova (China) Lu Jiajing
March 10	Shenzhen, China; Hard; W50; Singles and doubles draws	(Hong Kong) Cody Wong (China) Zheng Wushuang; 3–6, 7–5, [10–2]	(China) Li Zongyu (China) Xun Fangying	(Thailand) Lanlana Tararudee (China) Li Zongyu	Kristina Dmitruk (United States) Hina Inoue (Australia) Arina Rodionova (China) Lu Jiajing
March 10	Mildura, Australia; Grass; W35; Singles and doubles draws	(Australia) Lizette Cabrera; 6–0, 7–5	(Japan) Chihiro Muramatsu	(Japan) Sakura Hosogi (Australia) Laquisa Khan	(Japan) Ayumi Miyamoto (New Zealand) Monique Barry (Australia) Alicia Smith (Australia) Elena Micic
March 10	Mildura, Australia; Grass; W35; Singles and doubles draws	(Australia) Lizette Cabrera (Australia) Gabriella Da Silva-Fick; 2–6, 6–3, [12–10]	(Australia) Alicia Smith (Australia) Belle Thompson	(Japan) Sakura Hosogi (Australia) Laquisa Khan	(Japan) Ayumi Miyamoto (New Zealand) Monique Barry (Australia) Alicia Smith (Australia) Elena Micic
March 10	Nonthaburi, Thailand; Hard; W35; Singles and doubles draws	(South Korea) Lee Eun-hye; 6–3, 6–4	(South Korea) Back Da-yeon	Polina Iatcenko (Germany) Antonia Schmidt	(Japan) Mayuka Aikawa; Ekaterina Reyngold (Thailand) Thasaporn Naklo (Thailand) Anchisa Chanta
March 10	Nonthaburi, Thailand; Hard; W35; Singles and doubles draws	(India) Shrivalli Bhamidipaty (India) Vaidehi Chaudhari; 6–4, 6–3	(Thailand) Punnin Kovapitukted (Japan) Yuki Naito	Polina Iatcenko (Germany) Antonia Schmidt	(Japan) Mayuka Aikawa; Ekaterina Reyngold (Thailand) Thasaporn Naklo (Thailand) Anchisa Chanta
March 10	Solarino, Italy; Carpet; W35; Singles and doubles draws	(Chinese Taipei) Joanna Garland; 7–6^{(7–4)}, 6–2	(Slovakia) Viktória Hrunčáková	(Italy) Dalila Spiteri (Belgium) Sofia Costoulas	(Czech Republic) Julie Paštiková (Serbia) Natalija Stevanović (Egypt) Sandra Samir (Japan) Hiromi Abe
March 10	Solarino, Italy; Carpet; W35; Singles and doubles draws	(Slovakia) Viktória Hrunčáková (Slovakia) Katarína Kužmová; 6–7^{(4–7)}, 6–4, [10–5]	(Belgium) Sofia Costoulas (Germany) Katharina Hobgarski	(Italy) Dalila Spiteri (Belgium) Sofia Costoulas	(Czech Republic) Julie Paštiková (Serbia) Natalija Stevanović (Egypt) Sandra Samir (Japan) Hiromi Abe
March 10	Gonesse, France; Clay (i); W15; Singles and doubles draws	(Italy) Lisa Pigato; 6–1, 6–4	(France) Thessy Ntondele Zinga	(Belgium) Jeline Vandromme (Spain) Cristina Díaz Adrover	(France) Pauline Payet; Kristina Kroitor (France) Astrid Cirotte (France) Alizé Lim
March 10	Gonesse, France; Clay (i); W15; Singles and doubles draws	Kristina Kroitor; Anastasia Zolotareva; 6–2, 6–2	(France) Astrid Cirotte (France) Lucie Pawlak	(Belgium) Jeline Vandromme (Spain) Cristina Díaz Adrover	(France) Pauline Payet; Kristina Kroitor (France) Astrid Cirotte (France) Alizé Lim
March 10	Alaminos, Cyprus; Clay; W15; Singles and doubles draws	(Switzerland) Marie Mettraux; 6–4, 2–6, 6–4	(Romania) Ștefania Bojică	(Austria) Ekaterina Perelygina (Italy) Laura Mair	(United Kingdom) Alice Gillan (Italy) Eleonora Alvisi (Italy) Gaia Squarcialupi; Polina Bakhmutkina
March 10	Alaminos, Cyprus; Clay; W15; Singles and doubles draws	(Romania) Ștefania Bojică (Switzerland) Marie Mettraux; 6–2, 4–6, [10–7]	(Ukraine) Anastasiia Firman (Switzerland) Chelsea Fontenel	(Austria) Ekaterina Perelygina (Italy) Laura Mair	(United Kingdom) Alice Gillan (Italy) Eleonora Alvisi (Italy) Gaia Squarcialupi; Polina Bakhmutkina
March 10	Antalya, Turkiye; Clay; W15; Singles and doubles draws	(Ukraine) Yelyzaveta Kotliar; 3–6, 6–4, 6–1	(Turkey) İlay Yörük	Ekaterina Ovcharenko (Germany) Chantal Sauvant	Diana Demidova (Romania) Diana-Ioana Simionescu (Italy) Alessandra Mazzola (Bulgaria) Denislava Glushkova
March 10	Antalya, Turkiye; Clay; W15; Singles and doubles draws	(Czech Republic) Denisa Hindová (Poland) Daria Kuczer; 6–1, 7–5	(Romania) Ilinca Amariei (Germany) Chantal Sauvant	Ekaterina Ovcharenko (Germany) Chantal Sauvant	Diana Demidova (Romania) Diana-Ioana Simionescu (Italy) Alessandra Mazzola (Bulgaria) Denislava Glushkova
March 10	Sharm El Sheikh, Egypt; Hard; W15; Singles and doubles draws	(Netherlands) Anouck Vrancken Peeters; 7–5, 3–6, 6–2	(Czech Republic) Anna Sisková	(Bulgaria) Isabella Shinikova (Sweden) Julita Saner	(Portugal) Inês Murta; Evgeniya Burdina (Georgia (country)) Zoziya Kardava (United Kingdom) Victoria Allen
March 10	Sharm El Sheikh, Egypt; Hard; W15; Singles and doubles draws	(United States) Carolyn Ansari (Poland) Zuzanna Pawlikowska; 6–4, 6–0	(Romania) Elena-Teodora Cadar (Bulgaria) Isabella Shinikova	(Bulgaria) Isabella Shinikova (Sweden) Julita Saner	(Portugal) Inês Murta; Evgeniya Burdina (Georgia (country)) Zoziya Kardava (United Kingdom) Victoria Allen
March 10	Monastir, Tunisia; Hard; W15; Singles and doubles draws	(United States) Eryn Cayetano; 6–3, 6–3	(United States) Julia Adams	(Italy) Arianna Zucchini (United Kingdom) Esther Adeshina	(Greece) Sapfo Sakellaridi (Serbia) Elena Milovanović (Switzerland) Alina Granwehr (Austria) Mavie Österreicher
March 10	Monastir, Tunisia; Hard; W15; Singles and doubles draws	(United States) Eryn Cayetano (Czech Republic) Emma Slavíková; 7–5, 3–6, [10–4]	(United States) Julia Adams (United Kingdom) Esther Adeshina	(Italy) Arianna Zucchini (United Kingdom) Esther Adeshina	(Greece) Sapfo Sakellaridi (Serbia) Elena Milovanović (Switzerland) Alina Granwehr (Austria) Mavie Österreicher
March 10	Montreal, Canada; Hard (i); W15; Singles and doubles draws	(United States) Christasha McNeil; 6–4, 6–4	(United Kingdom) Emily Appleton	(Canada) Ariana Arseneault (United States) Sara Daavettila	(United States) Dasha Ivanova (United States) Jada Robinson (United States) Amy Zhu (United States) Sabastiani Leon
March 10	Montreal, Canada; Hard (i); W15; Singles and doubles draws	(Canada) Raphaëlle Lacasse (United States) Christina McHale; 7–5, 6–1	(United States) Sara Daavettila (United States) Sabastiani Leon	(Canada) Ariana Arseneault (United States) Sara Daavettila	(United States) Dasha Ivanova (United States) Jada Robinson (United States) Amy Zhu (United States) Sabastiani Leon
March 17	Branik Maribor Open; Maribor, Slovenia; Hard (i); W75; Singles and doubles draws	(Croatia) Antonia Ružić; 6–1, 4–6, 6–3	(Poland) Linda Klimovičová	(France) Manon Léonard (North Macedonia) Lina Gjorcheska	(Czech Republic) Tereza Valentová (Serbia) Natalija Senić (Georgia (country)) Mariam Bolkvadze (Slovenia) Kaja Juvan
March 17	Branik Maribor Open; Maribor, Slovenia; Hard (i); W75; Singles and doubles draws	(France) Julie Belgraver (Poland) Urszula Radwańska; 6–1, 6–4	(United Kingdom) Lily Miyazaki (France) Jessika Ponchet	(France) Manon Léonard (North Macedonia) Lina Gjorcheska	(Czech Republic) Tereza Valentová (Serbia) Natalija Senić (Georgia (country)) Mariam Bolkvadze (Slovenia) Kaja Juvan
March 17	Jin'an Open; Lu'an, China; Hard; W75; Singles and doubles draws	(Australia) Arina Rodionova; 6–3, 1–6, 6–3	(Thailand) Lanlana Tararudee	(China) Li Zongyu (United States) Emina Bektas	(Canada) Carol Zhao (China) Shi Han (China) Zheng Wushuang (Serbia) Aleksandra Krunić
March 17	Jin'an Open; Lu'an, China; Hard; W75; Singles and doubles draws	(Indonesia) Priska Nugroho (India) Ankita Raina; 6–0, 6–3	Kristina Dmitruk; Kira Pavlova	(China) Li Zongyu (United States) Emina Bektas	(Canada) Carol Zhao (China) Shi Han (China) Zheng Wushuang (Serbia) Aleksandra Krunić
March 17	Kōfu International Open; Kōfu, Japan; Hard; W50; Singles and doubles draws	(Japan) Haruka Kaji; 7–6^{(7–2)}, 6–3	(Japan) Himeno Sakatsume	(Japan) Ikumi Yamazaki (Japan) Sara Saito	(Japan) Kyōka Okamura (China) Ma Yexin (Japan) Miho Kuramochi (South Korea) Park So-hyun
March 17	Kōfu International Open; Kōfu, Japan; Hard; W50; Singles and doubles draws	(Japan) Momoko Kobori (Japan) Ayano Shimizu; 6–1, 6–4	(Japan) Akiko Omae (Japan) Eri Shimizu	(Japan) Ikumi Yamazaki (Japan) Sara Saito	(Japan) Kyōka Okamura (China) Ma Yexin (Japan) Miho Kuramochi (South Korea) Park So-hyun
March 17	Vacaria Open; Vacaria, Brazil; Clay (i); W50; Singles and doubles draws	(Italy) Aurora Zantedeschi; 4–6, 7–5, 7–5	Iryna Shymanovich	(Italy) Miriana Tona (Greece) Despina Papamichail	(Italy) Diletta Cherubini (Cyprus) Raluca Șerban (Ukraine) Valeriya Strakhova (Netherlands) Eva Vedder
March 17	Vacaria Open; Vacaria, Brazil; Clay (i); W50; Singles and doubles draws	(Czech Republic) Michaela Bayerlová (Italy) Miriana Tona; 6–7^{(4–7)}, 7–6^{(7–5)}, [10–7]	(United States) Robin Anderson (Spain) Alicia Herrero Liñana	(Italy) Miriana Tona (Greece) Despina Papamichail	(Italy) Diletta Cherubini (Cyprus) Raluca Șerban (Ukraine) Valeriya Strakhova (Netherlands) Eva Vedder
March 17	Santo Domingo, Dominican Republic; Hard; W50; Singles and doubles draws	(United States) Whitney Osuigwe; 6–2, 7–5	(Mexico) Ana Sofía Sánchez	(United States) Maria Mateas; Mariia Tkacheva	(France) Harmony Tan (Portugal) Matilde Jorge (United States) Clervie Ngounoue (Belgium) Hanne Vandewinkel
March 17	Santo Domingo, Dominican Republic; Hard; W50; Singles and doubles draws	Anastasia Tikhonova; Mariia Tkacheva; 7–6^{(7–5)}, 6–7^{(2–7)}, [10–7]	(United States) Ayana Akli (United States) Clervie Ngounoue	(United States) Maria Mateas; Mariia Tkacheva	(France) Harmony Tan (Portugal) Matilde Jorge (United States) Clervie Ngounoue (Belgium) Hanne Vandewinkel
March 17	Swan Hill, Australia; Grass; W35; Singles and doubles draws	(Australia) Lizette Cabrera; 6–4, 6–3	(Japan) Sakura Hosogi	(Australia) Gabriella Da Silva-Fick (Australia) Elena Micic	(Japan) Chihiro Muramatsu (Netherlands) Demi Tran (Australia) Sarah Mildren (South Korea) Ku Yeon-woo
March 17	Swan Hill, Australia; Grass; W35; Singles and doubles draws	(Japan) Ayumi Miyamoto (Australia) Stefani Webb; 6–3, 4–6, [10–4]	(New Zealand) Monique Barry (Australia) Elena Micic	(Australia) Gabriella Da Silva-Fick (Australia) Elena Micic	(Japan) Chihiro Muramatsu (Netherlands) Demi Tran (Australia) Sarah Mildren (South Korea) Ku Yeon-woo
March 17	Sabadell, Spain; Clay; W35; Singles and doubles draws	(Spain) Guiomar Maristany; 6–3, 6–3	(Australia) Astra Sharma	(Spain) Andrea Lázaro García (Slovenia) Pia Lovrič	(Greece) Martha Matoula (France) Loïs Boisson (Spain) Carlota Martínez Círez (Spain) Marina Bassols Ribera
March 17	Sabadell, Spain; Clay; W35; Singles and doubles draws	(Spain) Aliona Bolsova (Switzerland) Ylena In-Albon; 6–4, 6–0	(Slovenia) Živa Falkner (Slovenia) Pia Lovrič	(Spain) Andrea Lázaro García (Slovenia) Pia Lovrič	(Greece) Martha Matoula (France) Loïs Boisson (Spain) Carlota Martínez Círez (Spain) Marina Bassols Ribera
March 17	Solarino, Italy; Carpet; W35; Singles and doubles draws	(Italy) Samira De Stefano; 6–3, 6–3	(Japan) Hiromi Abe	(Italy) Federica Di Sarra (Czech Republic) Vendula Valdmannová	(Italy) Jessica Pieri (Spain) Celia Cerviño Ruiz (Egypt) Sandra Samir (Italy) Anastasia Bertacchi
March 17	Solarino, Italy; Carpet; W35; Singles and doubles draws	(Japan) Hiromi Abe (Japan) Hikaru Sato; 6–2, 6–3	(Spain) Celia Cerviño Ruiz (Spain) Lucía Cortez Llorca	(Italy) Federica Di Sarra (Czech Republic) Vendula Valdmannová	(Italy) Jessica Pieri (Spain) Celia Cerviño Ruiz (Egypt) Sandra Samir (Italy) Anastasia Bertacchi
March 17	Nonthaburi, Thailand; Hard; W15; Singles and doubles draws	(Thailand) Anchisa Chanta; 7–6^{(7–3)}, 6–3	(South Korea) Back Da-yeon	(Japan) Yuki Naito (France) Marine Szostak	(Japan) Rinko Matsuda; Alisa Kummel (Cyprus) Daria Frayman (Netherlands) Joy de Zeeuw
March 17	Nonthaburi, Thailand; Hard; W15; Singles and doubles draws	(South Korea) Kim Na-ri (Thailand) Punnin Kovapitukted; 6–4, 6–7^{(5–7)}, [10–7]	(Thailand) Patcharin Cheapchandej (Thailand) Kamonwan Yodpetch	(Japan) Yuki Naito (France) Marine Szostak	(Japan) Rinko Matsuda; Alisa Kummel (Cyprus) Daria Frayman (Netherlands) Joy de Zeeuw
March 17	Le Havre, France; Clay (i); W15; Singles and doubles draws	(Ukraine) Veronika Podrez; 6–1, 6–1	(France) Mathilde Lollia	(Belgium) Amélie Van Impe (Spain) Cristina Díaz Adrover	Anastasia Zolotareva; Kristina Kroitor (Belgium) Jeline Vandromme (Netherlands) Jasmijn Gimbrère
March 17	Le Havre, France; Clay (i); W15; Singles and doubles draws	Kristina Kroitor; Anastasia Zolotareva; 6–4, 6–4	(Belgium) Kaat Coppez (Belgium) Amélie Van Impe	(Belgium) Amélie Van Impe (Spain) Cristina Díaz Adrover	Anastasia Zolotareva; Kristina Kroitor (Belgium) Jeline Vandromme (Netherlands) Jasmijn Gimbrère
March 17	Heraklion, Greece; Clay; W15; Singles and doubles draws	(Bulgaria) Rositsa Dencheva; 2–6, 6–1, 6–1	(Spain) Alba Rey García	(Poland) Marcelina Podlińska (Italy) Gloria Ceschi	(Romania) Bianca Bărbulescu (Denmark) Olga Helmi (Greece) Elena Korokozidi (Spain) Noelia Bouzó Zanotti
March 17	Heraklion, Greece; Clay; W15; Singles and doubles draws	(Latvia) Margarita Ignatjeva (Greece) Elena Korokozidi; Walkover	(Romania) Simona Ogescu (Romania) Ioana Teodora Sava	(Poland) Marcelina Podlińska (Italy) Gloria Ceschi	(Romania) Bianca Bărbulescu (Denmark) Olga Helmi (Greece) Elena Korokozidi (Spain) Noelia Bouzó Zanotti
March 17	Alaminos, Cyprus; Clay; W15; Singles and doubles draws	(Hungary) Luca Udvardy; 6–1, 7–5	(Italy) Jessica Bertoldo	(Switzerland) Jenny Dürst (Spain) Mercedes Aristegui	(Ukraine) Anastasiia Firman (Romania) Oana Georgeta Simion; Alexandra Vasilyeva (Hungary) Adrienn Nagy
March 17	Alaminos, Cyprus; Clay; W15; Singles and doubles draws	(Italy) Jessica Bertoldo (Italy) Gaia Squarcialupi; 6–2, 4–6, [10–7]	(Poland) Anna Hertel (Switzerland) Marie Mettraux	(Switzerland) Jenny Dürst (Spain) Mercedes Aristegui	(Ukraine) Anastasiia Firman (Romania) Oana Georgeta Simion; Alexandra Vasilyeva (Hungary) Adrienn Nagy
March 17	Antalya, Turkiye; Clay; W15; Singles and doubles draws	Arina Bulatova; 6–3, 6–4	(Ukraine) Yelyzaveta Kotliar	(Romania) Patricia Maria Țig (Italy) Alessandra Mazzola	(Serbia) Anastasija Cvetković (Serbia) Anja Stanković (Czech Republic) Jana Kovačková (Bulgaria) Denislava Glushkova
March 17	Antalya, Turkiye; Clay; W15; Singles and doubles draws	(Poland) Daria Kuczer (Romania) Patricia Maria Țig; 6–4, 6–2	Ekaterina Ovcharenko (United Kingdom) Emily Webley-Smith	(Romania) Patricia Maria Țig (Italy) Alessandra Mazzola	(Serbia) Anastasija Cvetković (Serbia) Anja Stanković (Czech Republic) Jana Kovačková (Bulgaria) Denislava Glushkova
March 17	Sharm El Sheikh, Egypt; Hard; W15; Singles and doubles draws	(Bulgaria) Isabella Shinikova; 6–1, 6–2	(Georgia (country)) Sofia Shapatava	(Poland) Zuzanna Pawlikowska (Egypt) Lamis Alhussein Abdel Aziz	Maria Kalyakina (Japan) Kanon Sawashiro (Portugal) Inês Murta; Vlada Zvereva
March 17	Sharm El Sheikh, Egypt; Hard; W15; Singles and doubles draws	(United Kingdom) Victoria Allen (United States) Carolyn Ansari; 6–2, 6–2	(United Kingdom) Danielle Daley (Romania) Arina Vasilescu	(Poland) Zuzanna Pawlikowska (Egypt) Lamis Alhussein Abdel Aziz	Maria Kalyakina (Japan) Kanon Sawashiro (Portugal) Inês Murta; Vlada Zvereva
March 17	Monastir, Tunisia; Hard; W15; Singles and doubles draws	(United States) Carol Young Suh Lee; 6–3, 4–6, 6–2	(Netherlands) Isis Louise van den Broek	(Greece) Sapfo Sakellaridi (Germany) Julia Stusek	(Netherlands) Britt du Pree (Germany) Mara Guth (Finland) Clarissa Blomqvist (Germany) Victoria Pohle
March 17	Monastir, Tunisia; Hard; W15; Singles and doubles draws	(Netherlands) Britt du Pree (Netherlands) Sarah van Emst; 6–3, 3–6, [10–7]	(Serbia) Elena Milovanović (France) Nina Radovanovic	(Greece) Sapfo Sakellaridi (Germany) Julia Stusek	(Netherlands) Britt du Pree (Germany) Mara Guth (Finland) Clarissa Blomqvist (Germany) Victoria Pohle
March 24	Murska Sobota, Slovenia; Hard (i); W75; Singles and doubles draws	(Czech Republic) Tereza Valentová; 1–6, 6–3, 6–2	(Georgia (country)) Mariam Bolkvadze	(France) Jessika Ponchet (Slovenia) Kaja Juvan	Julia Avdeeva (Czech Republic) Gabriela Knutson (Poland) Linda Klimovičová (Lithuania) Justina Mikulskytė
March 24	Murska Sobota, Slovenia; Hard (i); W75; Singles and doubles draws	(Croatia) Petra Marčinko (Croatia) Tara Würth; 6–3, 3–6, [10–4]	(Chinese Taipei) Cho I-hsuan (Chinese Taipei) Cho Yi-tsen	(France) Jessika Ponchet (Slovenia) Kaja Juvan	Julia Avdeeva (Czech Republic) Gabriela Knutson (Poland) Linda Klimovičová (Lithuania) Justina Mikulskytė
March 24	Vacaria Open 2 Vacaria, Brazil; Clay (i); W75; Singles and doubles draws	(United Kingdom) Francesca Jones; 1–6, 6–4, 6–1	(France) Léolia Jeanjean	(Ukraine) Oleksandra Oliynykova (Argentina) Julia Riera	(Brazil) Gabriela Cé (Greece) Despina Papamichail (Poland) Katarzyna Kawa (Brazil) Laura Pigossi
March 24	Vacaria Open 2 Vacaria, Brazil; Clay (i); W75; Singles and doubles draws	(United States) Robin Anderson (Spain) Alicia Herrero Liñana; 7–5, 6–4	(Greece) Despina Papamichail (Argentina) Julia Riera	(Ukraine) Oleksandra Oliynykova (Argentina) Julia Riera	(Brazil) Gabriela Cé (Greece) Despina Papamichail (Poland) Katarzyna Kawa (Brazil) Laura Pigossi
March 24	Bujumbura, Burundi; Clay; W50; Singles and doubles draws	(Burundi) Sada Nahimana; 6–1, 6–1	(France) Émeline Dartron	Ksenia Zaytseva; Ekaterina Kazionova	(Netherlands) Lian Tran (France) Astrid Lew Yan Foon (United States) Julia Adams (Poland) Weronika Falkowska
March 24	Bujumbura, Burundi; Clay; W50; Singles and doubles draws	(Switzerland) Chelsea Fontenel; Ksenia Zaytseva; 4–6, 6–1, [11–9]	(Netherlands) Demi Tran (Netherlands) Lian Tran	Ksenia Zaytseva; Ekaterina Kazionova	(Netherlands) Lian Tran (France) Astrid Lew Yan Foon (United States) Julia Adams (Poland) Weronika Falkowska
March 24	Santo Domingo, Dominican Republic; Hard; W50; Singles and doubles draws	(Canada) Carson Branstine; 6–1, 6–3	(Mexico) Ana Sofía Sánchez	(Canada) Kayla Cross (Belgium) Hanne Vandewinkel	(United Kingdom) Amarni Banks (United States) Sara Daavettila (United States) Clervie Ngounoue (United States) Akasha Urhobo
March 24	Santo Domingo, Dominican Republic; Hard; W50; Singles and doubles draws	(United Kingdom) Holly Hutchinson (United Kingdom) Ella McDonald; 6–1, 6–4	(United States) Carmen Corley (United States) Maribella Zamarripa	(Canada) Kayla Cross (Belgium) Hanne Vandewinkel	(United Kingdom) Amarni Banks (United States) Sara Daavettila (United States) Clervie Ngounoue (United States) Akasha Urhobo
March 24	Terrassa, Spain; Clay; W35; Singles and doubles draws	(Austria) Lilli Tagger; 7–6^{(7–4)}, 6–3	(France) Loïs Boisson	(United Kingdom) Hannah Klugman (Spain) Irene Burillo Escorihuela	(Italy) Lisa Pigato (France) Alice Ramé (Spain) Marina Bassols Ribera (France) Margaux Rouvroy
March 24	Terrassa, Spain; Clay; W35; Singles and doubles draws	(Czech Republic) Aneta Kučmová (Germany) Caroline Werner; 3–6, 6–1, [10–6]	Alina Charaeva (France) Yasmine Mansouri	(United Kingdom) Hannah Klugman (Spain) Irene Burillo Escorihuela	(Italy) Lisa Pigato (France) Alice Ramé (Spain) Marina Bassols Ribera (France) Margaux Rouvroy
March 24	Antalya, Turkiye; Clay; W35; Singles and doubles draws	(Czech Republic) Jana Kovačková; 6–0, 6–1	(Bulgaria) Denislava Glushkova	(Romania) Cristina Dinu (Ukraine) Yelyzaveta Kotliar	(Italy) Silvia Ambrosio (Romania) Ilinca Amariei (Hungary) Amarissa Tóth; Alisa Oktiabreva
March 24	Antalya, Turkiye; Clay; W35; Singles and doubles draws	(United States) Makenna Jones (Bulgaria) Lia Karatancheva; 6–2, 6–2	(Romania) Ilinca Amariei (Romania) Cristina Dinu	(Romania) Cristina Dinu (Ukraine) Yelyzaveta Kotliar	(Italy) Silvia Ambrosio (Romania) Ilinca Amariei (Hungary) Amarissa Tóth; Alisa Oktiabreva
March 24	Nonthaburi, Thailand; Hard; W15; Singles and doubles draws	Kristiana Sidorova; 6–3, 6–2	(Thailand) Punnin Kovapitukted	(Thailand) Anchisa Chanta (Thailand) Patcharin Cheapchandej	(South Korea) Jang Ga-eul (Japan) Mana Kawamura (Slovakia) Viktória Morvayová (Thailand) Kamonwan Yodpetch
March 24	Nonthaburi, Thailand; Hard; W15; Singles and doubles draws	(South Korea) Kim Na-ri (Thailand) Punnin Kovapitukted; 6–3, 6–0	(Thailand) Lunda Kumhom (Thailand) Kamonwan Yodpetch	(Thailand) Anchisa Chanta (Thailand) Patcharin Cheapchandej	(South Korea) Jang Ga-eul (Japan) Mana Kawamura (Slovakia) Viktória Morvayová (Thailand) Kamonwan Yodpetch
March 24	Heraklion, Greece; Clay; W15; Singles and doubles draws	(Finland) Laura Hietaranta; 6–4, 6–4	Ekaterina Makarova	(Romania) Bianca Bărbulescu (Greece) Dimitra Pavlou	(Romania) Elena Ruxandra Bertea (Israel) Maayan Laron (Germany) Eva Marie Voracek (Spain) Alba Rey García
March 24	Heraklion, Greece; Clay; W15; Singles and doubles draws	(Latvia) Margarita Ignatjeva (Greece) Elena Korokozidi; 6–4, 6–2	(Greece) Marianne Argyrokastriti (Greece) Dimitra Pavlou	(Romania) Bianca Bărbulescu (Greece) Dimitra Pavlou	(Romania) Elena Ruxandra Bertea (Israel) Maayan Laron (Germany) Eva Marie Voracek (Spain) Alba Rey García
March 24	Alaminos, Cyprus; Clay; W15; Singles and doubles draws	(Switzerland) Jenny Dürst; 6–3, 3–6, 6–3	(Romania) Irina Fetecău	(Italy) Gaia Squarcialupi (Fiji) Saoirse Breen	(Romania) Oana Georgeta Simion (Hungary) Adrienn Nagy (Spain) Mercedes Aristegui (Italy) Beatrice Ricci
March 24	Alaminos, Cyprus; Clay; W15; Singles and doubles draws	(Czech Republic) Linda Ševčíková (Romania) Oana Georgeta Simion; 7–5, 6–3	(Uzbekistan) Vlada Ekshibarova (Ukraine) Anastasiia Firman	(Italy) Gaia Squarcialupi (Fiji) Saoirse Breen	(Romania) Oana Georgeta Simion (Hungary) Adrienn Nagy (Spain) Mercedes Aristegui (Italy) Beatrice Ricci
March 24	Sharm El Sheikh, Egypt; Hard; W15; Singles and doubles draws	(United States) Carolyn Ansari; 6–2, 3–6, 6–4	(Lithuania) Patricija Paukštytė	(Egypt) Sandra Samir (Slovakia) Katarína Kužmová	(Romania) Arina Vasilescu (Romania) Karola Bejenaru; Maria Kalyakina (Switzerland) Paula Cembranos
March 24	Sharm El Sheikh, Egypt; Hard; W15; Singles and doubles draws	(Romania) Karola Bejenaru (Romania) Arina Vasilescu; 2–6, 6–3, [10–6]	(Poland) Daria Gorska (Ukraine) Kateryna Lazarenko	(Egypt) Sandra Samir (Slovakia) Katarína Kužmová	(Romania) Arina Vasilescu (Romania) Karola Bejenaru; Maria Kalyakina (Switzerland) Paula Cembranos
March 24	Monastir, Tunisia; Hard; W15; Singles and doubles draws	(Netherlands) Sarah van Emst; 7–6^{(10–8)}, 6–4	(Serbia) Elena Milovanović	(France) Maëlle Leclercq (Netherlands) Isis Louise van den Broek	(Germany) Julia Stusek (Netherlands) Britt du Pree (France) Mathilde Lollia (Lithuania) Klaudija Bubelytė
March 24	Monastir, Tunisia; Hard; W15; Singles and doubles draws	(Greece) Sapfo Sakellaridi (Slovakia) Radka Zelníčková; 6–2, 6–3	(Italy) Lavinia Luciano (Romania) Maria Toma	(France) Maëlle Leclercq (Netherlands) Isis Louise van den Broek	(Germany) Julia Stusek (Netherlands) Britt du Pree (France) Mathilde Lollia (Lithuania) Klaudija Bubelytė
March 31	Open Nantes Atlantique; Nantes, France; Hard (i); W50; Singles and doubles draws	(Australia) Talia Gibson; 3–6, 7–5, 6–1	(Malta) Francesca Curmi	(United Kingdom) Lily Miyazaki (Belgium) Sofia Costoulas	(Slovakia) Mia Pohánková (France) Harmony Tan (Germany) Anna-Lena Friedsam (Sweden) Jacqueline Cabaj Awad
March 31	Open Nantes Atlantique; Nantes, France; Hard (i); W50; Singles and doubles draws	(Poland) Martyna Kubka (Sweden) Lisa Zaar; 6–3, 6–2	(Belgium) Sofia Costoulas (Australia) Talia Gibson	(United Kingdom) Lily Miyazaki (Belgium) Sofia Costoulas	(Slovakia) Mia Pohánková (France) Harmony Tan (Germany) Anna-Lena Friedsam (Sweden) Jacqueline Cabaj Awad
March 31	Bujumbura, Burundi; Clay; W50; Singles and doubles draws	(Burundi) Sada Nahimana; 6–3, 6–2	(France) Tiantsoa Sarah Rakotomanga Rajaonah	(France) Astrid Lew Yan Foon (Netherlands) Jasmijn Gimbrère	(Georgia (country)) Ekaterine Gorgodze (France) Nahia Berecoechea; Ekaterina Kazionova (Poland) Monika Stankiewicz
March 31	Bujumbura, Burundi; Clay; W50; Singles and doubles draws	(United States) Julia Adams; Anna Ureke; 6–1, 6–2	(France) Émeline Dartron (France) Tiantsoa Sarah Rakotomanga Rajaonah	(France) Astrid Lew Yan Foon (Netherlands) Jasmijn Gimbrère	(Georgia (country)) Ekaterine Gorgodze (France) Nahia Berecoechea; Ekaterina Kazionova (Poland) Monika Stankiewicz
March 31	Santa Margherita di Pula, Italy; Clay; W35; Singles and doubles draws	(Austria) Julia Grabher; 7–5, 6–0	(Italy) Jessica Pieri	(Greece) Despina Papamichail (Spain) Ariana Geerlings	(Germany) Stephanie Wagner (Japan) Ikumi Yamazaki (Italy) Beatrice Ricci (Italy) Vittoria Paganetti
March 31	Santa Margherita di Pula, Italy; Clay; W35; Singles and doubles draws	(Japan) Hikaru Sato (Japan) Ikumi Yamazaki; 7–5, 2–6, [10–4]	(Italy) Jessica Pieri (Italy) Tatiana Pieri	(Greece) Despina Papamichail (Spain) Ariana Geerlings	(Germany) Stephanie Wagner (Japan) Ikumi Yamazaki (Italy) Beatrice Ricci (Italy) Vittoria Paganetti
March 31	Jackson, United States; Clay; W35; Singles and doubles draws	(United States) Monika Ekstrand; 6–3, 6–4	(Mexico) Ana Sofía Sánchez	(Spain) Alicia Herrero Liñana (United States) Lea Ma	(Japan) Mayu Crossley (United States) Mary Lewis (United States) Salma Ewing (Serbia) Katarina Jokić
March 31	Jackson, United States; Clay; W35; Singles and doubles draws	(Spain) Alicia Herrero Liñana (United States) Maribella Zamarripa; 6–0, 6–2	(Italy) Diletta Cherubini (United States) Victoria Osuigwe	(Spain) Alicia Herrero Liñana (United States) Lea Ma	(Japan) Mayu Crossley (United States) Mary Lewis (United States) Salma Ewing (Serbia) Katarina Jokić
March 31	Kashiwa, Japan; Hard; W15; Singles and doubles draws	(Japan) Ayano Shimizu; 6–3, 6–3	(South Korea) Ku Yeon-woo	(Japan) Miho Kuramochi (Japan) Eri Shimizu	(Japan) Momoko Kobori (Japan) Natsumi Kawaguchi; Daria Egorova (Japan) Kisa Yoshioka
March 31	Kashiwa, Japan; Hard; W15; Singles and doubles draws	(South Korea) Ku Yeon-woo (Japan) Naho Sato; 6–2, 6–4	(Japan) Eri Shimizu (Japan) Kisa Yoshioka	(Japan) Miho Kuramochi (Japan) Eri Shimizu	(Japan) Momoko Kobori (Japan) Natsumi Kawaguchi; Daria Egorova (Japan) Kisa Yoshioka
March 31	Heraklion, Greece; Clay; W15; Singles and doubles draws	(Bulgaria) Rositsa Dencheva; 3–6, 6–4, 6–4	(Germany) Franziska Sziedat	(Germany) Katharina Hobgarski (Greece) Dimitra Pavlou	(Romania) Maria Sara Popa (Spain) Cristina Díaz Adrover (Finland) Laura Hietaranta (Germany) Angelina Wirges
March 31	Heraklion, Greece; Clay; W15; Singles and doubles draws	(Germany) Katharina Hobgarski (Hungary) Adrienn Nagy; 6–1, 6–1	(Bulgaria) Rositsa Dencheva (Germany) Franziska Sziedat	(Germany) Katharina Hobgarski (Greece) Dimitra Pavlou	(Romania) Maria Sara Popa (Spain) Cristina Díaz Adrover (Finland) Laura Hietaranta (Germany) Angelina Wirges
March 31	Antalya, Turkiye; Clay; W15; Singles and doubles draws	Victoria Kan; 6–7^{(10–12)}, 6–3, 6–4	Valeriya Yushchenko	Diana Demidova (Argentina) Agustina Chlpac	(China) Xu Shilin (Germany) Carolin Raschdorf (Belgium) Vicky Van de Peer (Italy) Laura Mair
March 31	Antalya, Turkiye; Clay; W15; Singles and doubles draws	(Germany) Annemarie Lazar (China) Xu Shilin; 7–6^{(7–2)}, 7–5	(Turkey) Selina Atay (Turkey) Melis Sezer	Diana Demidova (Argentina) Agustina Chlpac	(China) Xu Shilin (Germany) Carolin Raschdorf (Belgium) Vicky Van de Peer (Italy) Laura Mair
March 31	Sharm El Sheikh, Egypt; Hard; W15; Singles and doubles draws	(United States) Carolyn Ansari; 6–4, 2–6, 6–3	(United States) Dasha Ivanova	(Poland) Weronika Ewald (Romania) Karola Bejenaru	(Slovakia) Katarína Kužmová (Egypt) Yasmin Ezzat (Netherlands) Madelief Hageman (United Kingdom) Hephzibah Oluwadare
March 31	Sharm El Sheikh, Egypt; Hard; W15; Singles and doubles draws	(Netherlands) Madelief Hageman (United States) Dasha Ivanova; 6–4, 7–5	(Poland) Weronika Ewald (Poland) Daria Gorska	(Poland) Weronika Ewald (Romania) Karola Bejenaru	(Slovakia) Katarína Kužmová (Egypt) Yasmin Ezzat (Netherlands) Madelief Hageman (United Kingdom) Hephzibah Oluwadare
March 31	Monastir, Tunisia; Hard; W15; Singles and doubles draws	(Italy) Arianna Zucchini; 1–6, 6–4, 6–0	Daria Khomutsianskaya	(Greece) Sapfo Sakellaridi (Slovakia) Radka Zelníčková	(Italy) Lavinia Luciano (Italy) Angelica Raggi (Bulgaria) Iva Ivanova (United Kingdom) Esther Adeshina
March 31	Monastir, Tunisia; Hard; W15; Singles and doubles draws	(Greece) Sapfo Sakellaridi (Slovakia) Radka Zelníčková; 6–1, 6–0	Sofya Gapankova; Daria Khomutsianskaya	(Greece) Sapfo Sakellaridi (Slovakia) Radka Zelníčková	(Italy) Lavinia Luciano (Italy) Angelica Raggi (Bulgaria) Iva Ivanova (United Kingdom) Esther Adeshina
