= 2025 ITF Nonthaburi – Singles =

Singles
- 2025 ITF Nonthaburi

Final
- Champion: (Japan) Kyōka Okamura
- Runner-up: (Liechtenstein) Kathinka von Deichmann
- Score: 7–5, 1–6, 7–5

Events
Singles	Doubles
← 2024 ·	ITF Nonthaburi	· 2026 →

Antonia Ružić was the defending champion but chose not to participate.

Kyōka Okamura won the title, defeating Kathinka von Deichmann in the final; 7–5, 1–6, 7–5.

== Seeds ==
1. (Liechtenstein) Kathinka von Deichmann (final)
2. (Thailand) Lanlana Tararudee (quarterfinals, withdrew)
3. (China) Shi Han (second round)
4. (France) Carole Monnet (second round)
5. (Belgium) Hanne Vandewinkel (quarterfinals)
6. (Japan) Kyōka Okamura (champion)
7. (China) Ma Yexin (quarterfinals)
8. (United States) Maria Mateas (quarterfinals)

== Draw ==
=== Key ===
- Q = Qualifier
- WC = Wild card
- LL = Lucky loser
- Alt = Alternate
- ITF = ITF entry
- PR = Protected ranking
- SR = Special ranking
- SE = Special exempt
- JE = Junior exempt
- JR = Junior Accelerator Programme entrant
- CO = College Accelerator Programme entrant
- NG = Next Gen Accelerator Program entrant
- w/o = Walkover
- r = Retired
- d = Defaulted

=== Finals ===
Semifinals
1	(Liechtenstein) Kathinka von Deichmann	6	6
(India) Sahaja Yamalapalli	0	3
(United States) Claire Liu
6	(Japan) Kyōka Okamura	w/o

Final
1	(Liechtenstein) Kathinka von Deichmann	5	6	5
6	(Japan) Kyōka Okamura	7	1	7

=== Top half ===
First round
1	(Liechtenstein) K von Deichmann	6	6
M Tkacheva	2	3
Q	(Hong Kong) C Wong	6	7^{9}
Q	(Romania) G Crăciun	4	6^{7}
Q	(India) V Chaudhari	6	4	2
(China) J Lu	3	6	6
Q	(Hong Kong) E Chong	6	1	5
5	(Belgium) H Vandewinkel	4	6	7
3	(China) H Shi	6	6
(United States) A Rogers	4	0
WC	(Thailand) K Yodpetch	3	4
(India) S Yamalapalli	6	6
SR	D Astakhova	6	4	6^{5}
Q	(Japan) R Saigo	2	6	7^{7}
Q	(Finland) A Kulikova	6^{4}	1
8	(United States) M Mateas	7^{7}	6

Second round
1	(Liechtenstein) K von Deichmann	6	6
Q	(Hong Kong) C Wong	2	2
(China) J Lu	2	2
5	(Belgium) H Vandewinkel	6	6
3	(China) H Shi	7	0	2
(India) S Yamalapalli	5	6	6
Q	(Japan) R Saigo	6^{2}	6^{3}
8	(United States) M Mateas	7^{7}	7^{7}

Quarterfinals
1	(Liechtenstein) K von Deichmann	6	7
5	(Belgium) H Vandewinkel	1	5
(India) S Yamalapalli	6	5	6
8	(United States) M Mateas	3	7	3

Semifinals
1	(Liechtenstein) K von Deichmann	6	6
(India) S Yamalapalli	0	3

=== Bottom half ===
First round
7	(China) Y Ma	6	4	6
WC	(Thailand) P Cheapchandej	2	6	4
(China) X Yao	7	7
(Japan) M Yamaguchi	5	5
(United States) C Liu	6	6
WC	(Thailand) T Naklo	3	0
(China) X You	7^{7}	0	3
4	(France) C Monnet	6^{4}	6	6
6	(Japan) K Okamura	6	0	6
Q	(China) W Zheng	3	6	3
WC	(Thailand) P Kovapitukted	5	0
(France) T Andrianjafitrimo	7	6
(South Korea) S-j Jang	6	7
Q	(Japan) M Kuramochi	2	5
SR	K Dmitruk	3	2
2	(Thailand) L Tararudee	6	6

Second round
7	(China) Y Ma	3	6	6
(China) X Yao	6	3	3
(United States) C Liu	0	7^{8}	6
4	(France) C Monnet	6	6^{6}	4
6	(Japan) K Okamura	6	6
(France) T Andrianjafitrimo	1	3
(South Korea) S-j Jang	5	6^{4}
2	(Thailand) L Tararudee	7	7^{7}

Quarterfinals
7	(China) Y Ma	5	6^{4}
(United States) C Liu	7	7^{7}
6	(Japan) K Okamura	w/o
2	(Thailand) L Tararudee

Semifinals
(United States) C Liu
6	(Japan) K Okamura	w/o
