= Zhang Jin =

Zhang Jin may refer to:

- Jin Zhang (biochemist) (born 1972), Chinese-American biochemist
- John J. Zhang or Zhang Jin, Chinese-American scientist
- Zhang Jin (actor) (born 1974), Chinese actor, martial artist and former wushu athlete
- Zhang Jin (badminton) (born 1972), Chinese badminton player
- Zhang Jin (bobsledder) (born 2003), Chinese bobsledder
- Zhang Jin (gymnast) (born 2000), Chinese gymnast
- Zhang Jin (physical chemist) (born 1969), Chinese physical chemist
- Zhang Jin (Three Kingdoms) (fl. 220), warlord of the Three Kingdoms era
- Zhang Jin (wrestler) (born 2006), Chinese freestyle wrestler
- Zhang Jin (Yuan dynasty) (1294–1374), Yuan dynasty government minister

== See also ==
- Zhang Jing (disambiguation)
