= 2025 ITF Nonthaburi – Doubles =

Doubles
- 2025 ITF Nonthaburi

Final
- Champion: (United States) Maria Mateas (United States) Alana Smith
- Runner-up: (Chinese Taipei) Cho I-hsuan (Chinese Taipei) Cho Yi-tsen
- Score: 6–1, 6–3

Events
Singles	Doubles
← 2024 ·	ITF Nonthaburi	· 2026 →

Zhibek Kulambayeva and Sapfo Sakellaridi were the defending champions, but Kulambayeva chose to participate at the United Cup. Sakellaridi partnered with Feng Shuo, but they lost in the first round to Cho I-hsuan and Cho Yi-tsen.

Maria Mateas and Alana Smith won the title, defeating Cho I-hsuan and Cho Yi-tsen in the final; 6–1, 6–3.

== Seeds ==
1. (Italy) Camilla Rosatello / (Czech Republic) Anna Sisková (quarterfinals)
2. (United States) Dalayna Hewitt / (United States) Anna Rogers (first round)
3. (China) Feng Shuo / (Greece) Sapfo Sakellaridi (first round)
4. (United Kingdom) Alicia Barnett / (India) Prarthana Thombare (first round)

== Draw ==
Key

- Q = Qualifier
- WC = Wild card
- LL = Lucky loser
- Alt = Alternate
- ITF = ITF entry
- PR = Protected ranking
- SR = Special ranking
- SE = Special exempt
- JE = Junior exempt
- JR = Junior Accelerator Programme entrant
- CO = College Accelerator Programme entrant
- NG = Next Gen Accelerator Program entrant
- w/o = Walkover
- r = Retired
- d = Defaulted

=== Draw ===
First round
1	(Italy) C Rosatello (Czech Republic) A Sisková	6	6
(South Korea) S-j Jang (Japan) H Kuwata	4	3
D Astakhova (India) S Yamalapalli	3	3
(Algeria) I Ibbou (Switzerland) N Karamoko	6	6
3	(China) S Feng (Greece) S Sakellaridi	3	2
(Chinese Taipei) I-h Cho (Chinese Taipei) Y-t Cho	6	6
(Thailand) P Cheapchandej (Thailand) P Kovapitukted	2	6	[10]
A Gureva; E Yashina	6	4	[4]
(United States) M Mateas (United States) A Smith	6	6
WC	(Thailand) L Podgorichani (Thailand) K Yodpetch	4	4
(Japan) S Imamura (Japan) N Sato	6	6
4	(United Kingdom) A Barnett (India) P Thombare	4	2
(Thailand) T Naklo (Thailand) B Thamchaiwat	6	6
(Japan) M Kobori (Japan) A Shimizu	4	2
(Hong Kong) E Chong (Japan) Y Naito	6	6
2	(United States) D Hewitt (United States) A Rogers	2	1

Quarterfinals
1	(Italy) C Rosatello (Czech Republic) A Sisková	3	6	[4]
(Algeria) I Ibbou (Switzerland) N Karamoko	6	1	[10]
(Chinese Taipei) I-h Cho (Chinese Taipei) Y-t Cho	6	7^{7}
(Thailand) P Cheapchandej (Thailand) P Kovapitukted	1	6^{2}
(United States) M Mateas (United States) A Smith	6	6
(Japan) S Imamura (Japan) N Sato	3	3
(Thailand) T Naklo (Thailand) B Thamchaiwat	2	6	[10]
(Hong Kong) E Chong (Japan) Y Naito	6	4	[7]

Semifinals
(Algeria) I Ibbou (Switzerland) N Karamoko	3	6	[6]
(Chinese Taipei) I-h Cho (Chinese Taipei) Y-t Cho	6	2	[10]
(United States) M Mateas (United States) A Smith	7	7
(Thailand) T Naklo (Thailand) B Thamchaiwat	5	5

Final
(Chinese Taipei) I-h Cho (Chinese Taipei) Y-t Cho	1	3
(United States) M Mateas (United States) A Smith	6	6
