= 2025 ITF Nonthaburi =

Tennis tournament

- Date: 30 December 2024–5 January 2025
- Edition: 5th
- Category: ITF Women's World Tennis Tour
- Prize money: $60,000
- Surface: Hard / Outdoor
- Location: Nonthaburi, Thailand

2024 Champions

Singles
- (Croatia) Antonia Ružić

Doubles
- (Kazakhstan) Zhibek Kulambayeva / (Greece) Sapfo Sakellaridi
← 2024 ·	ITF Nonthaburi	· 2026 →

The 2025 ITF Nonthaburi was a professional tennis tournament played on outdoor hard courts. It was the fifth edition of the tournament, which was part of the 2025 ITF Women's World Tennis Tour. It took place in Nonthaburi, Thailand, between 30 December 2024 and 5 January 2025.

== Champions ==
=== Singles ===
- (Japan) Kyōka Okamura vs. (Liechtenstein) Kathinka von Deichmann 7–5, 1–6, 7–5

=== Doubles ===
- (United States) Maria Mateas / (United States) Alana Smith vs. (Chinese Taipei) Cho I-hsuan / (Chinese Taipei) Cho Yi-tsen 6–1, 6–3

== Singles main draw entrants ==
=== Seeds ===
Country	Player	Rank	Seed
LIE	Kathinka von Deichmann	173	1
THA	Lanlana Tararudee	184	2
CHN	Shi Han	215	3
FRA	Carole Monnet	218	4
BEL	Hanne Vandewinkel	224	5
JPN	Kyōka Okamura	225	6
CHN	Ma Yexin	237	7
USA	Maria Mateas	244	8

- Rankings are as of 23 December 2024.

=== Other entrants ===
The following players received wildcards into the singles main draw:

- (Thailand) Patcharin Cheapchandej
- (Thailand) Punnin Kovapitukted
- (Thailand) Thasaporn Naklo
- (Thailand) Kamonwan Yodpetch

The following player received entry into the singles main draw using a special ranking:

- Darya Astakhova
- Kristina Dmitruk

The following players received entry from the qualifying draw:

- (India) Vaidehi Chaudhari
- (Hong Kong) Eudice Chong
- (Romania) Georgia Crăciun
- (Finland) Anastasia Kulikova
- (Japan) Miho Kuramochi
- (Japan) Rina Saigo
- (Hong Kong) Cody Wong
- (China) Zheng Wushuang
