= Kyōka Okamura =

Japanese tennis player (born 1995)

Kyōka Okamura 岡村 恭香
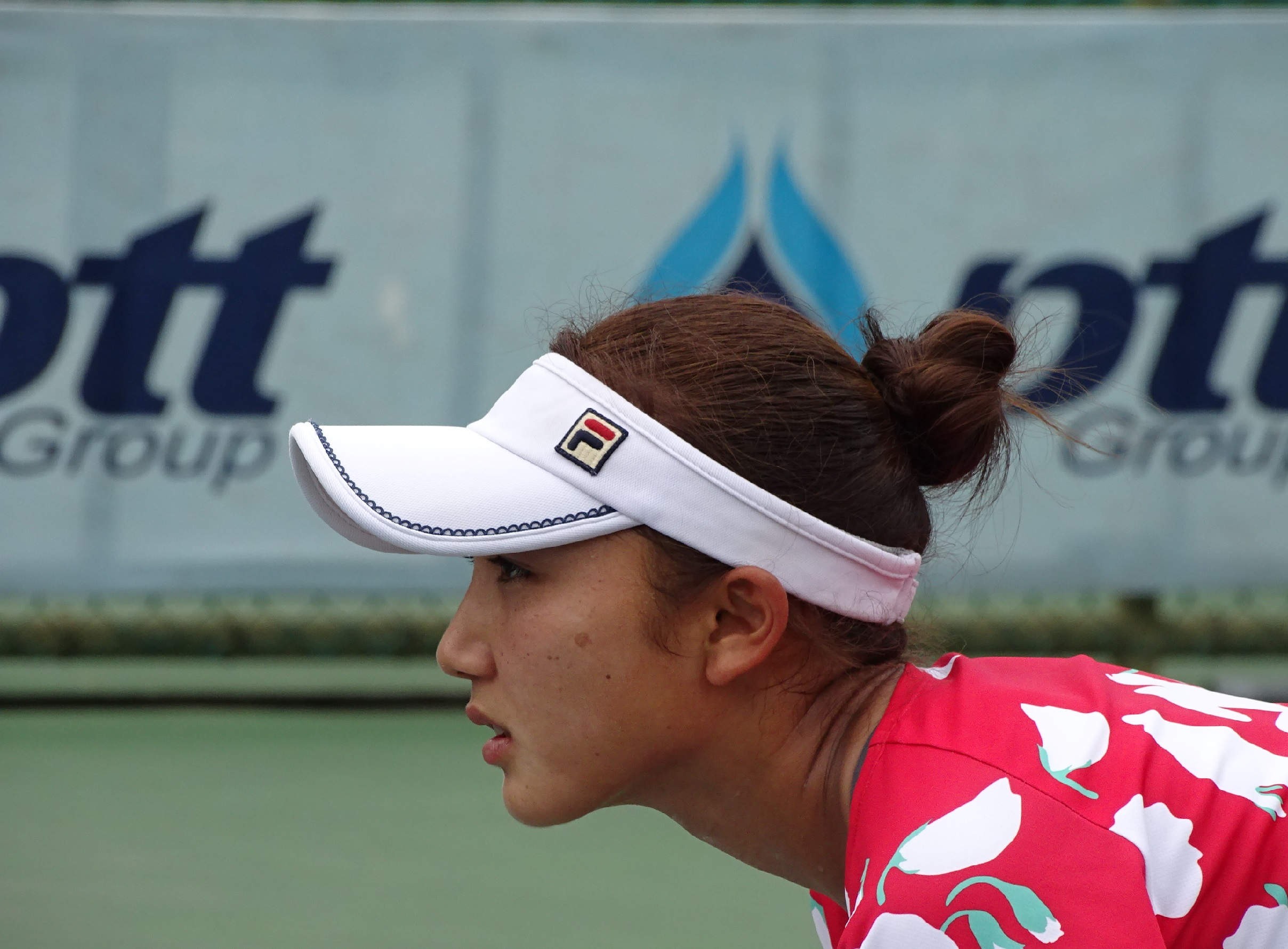
- Country (sports): Japan
- Residence: Tokyo, Japan
- Born: 6 October 1995 (age 31) Okayama, Japan
- Height: 1.65 m (5 ft 5 in)
- Plays: Right (two-handed backhand)
- Prize money: $489,101

Singles
- Career record: 386–335
- Career titles: 4 ITF
- Highest ranking: No. 178 (17 February 2025)
- Current ranking: No. 283 (31 August 2026)

Grand Slam singles results
- Australian Open: Q1 (2020, 2021, 2025)
- French Open: Q1 (2025)
- Wimbledon: Q1 (2025)
- US Open: Q1 (2025)

Doubles
- Career record: 179–161
- Career titles: 12 ITF
- Highest ranking: No. 229 (21 October 2019)
- Current ranking: No. 887 (31 August 2026)

Grand Slam doubles results
- Wimbledon Junior: 1R (2013)
- Last updated on: 7 September 2026.

Kyōka Okamura (岡村 恭香, Okamura Kyōka; born 6 October 1995) is a professional Japanese tennis player. Okamura has career-high WTA rankings of 181 in singles and 229 in doubles.

== Career ==
Okamura made her WTA Tour main-draw debut at the 2014 Japan Women's Open, where she received a wildcard entry into the doubles tournament, partnering with Kotomi Takahata. They defeated Misaki Doi and Elina Svitolina in the first round, but lost to Darija Jurak and Megan Moulton-Levy in the quarterfinals.

Partnering with You Xiaodi, she was runner-up in the doubles at the 2023 Copa Oster, a WTA 125 tournament, losing to Weronika Falkowska and Katarzyna Kawa in the final which went to a deciding champions tiebreak.

Okamura made the main draw at the 2024 Pan Pacific Open as a lucky loser and defeated qualifier Hailey Baptiste, having lost to her in the final qualifying round. Okamura lost to ninth seed Katie Boulter in the second round.

== WTA 125 finals ==
=== Singles: 1 (runner-up) ===
Result	W–L	Date	Tournament	Surface	Opponent	Score
Loss	0–1	Oct 2026	Suzhou Open, China	Hard	(Slovakia) Rebecca Šramková	3–6, 1–6

=== Doubles: 1 (runner-up) ===
Result	Date	Tournament	Surface	Partner	Opponents	Score
Loss	Feb 2023	Copa Bionaire, Colombia	Clay	(China) You Xiaodi	(Poland) Weronika Falkowska (Poland) Katarzyna Kawa	1–6, 7–5, [6–10]

== ITF Circuit finals ==
=== Singles: 15 (5 titles, 10 runner-ups) ===
Legend W75 tournaments (2–2) W50 tournaments (1–0) W25/35 tournaments (2–4) $10,000 tournaments (0–4)	Finals by surface Hard (4–7) Grass (1–0) Carpet (0–3)

Result	W–L	Date	Tournament	Tier	Surface	Opponent	Score
Loss	0–1	May 2014	ITF Bangkok, Thailand	10,000	Hard	(Japan) Michika Ozeki	4–6, 3–6
Loss	0–2	Sep 2014	ITF Kyoto, Japan	10,000	Hard (i)	(Thailand) Nudnida Luangnam	6–7^{(7)}, 6–3, 4–6
Loss	0–3	Mar 2015	ITF Nishitama, Japan	10,000	Hard	(Chinese Taipei) Hsu Ching-wen	3–6, 6–3, 4–6
Loss	0–4	Aug 2015	ITF Gimcheon, South Korea	10,000	Hard	(South Korea) Kim Na-ri	0–6, 4–6
Loss	0–5	Sep 2015	ITF Noto, Japan	25,000	Carpet	(Chinese Taipei) Lee Ya-hsuan	3–6, 6–3, 6–7^{(10)}
Loss	0–6	May 2016	Fukuoka International, Japan	50,000	Carpet	(Russia) Ksenia Lykina	2–6, 7–6^{(2)}, 0–6
Win	1–6	May 2016	Kurume Cup, Japan	50,000	Grass	(Uzbekistan) Nigina Abduraimova	7–6^{(10)}, 1–6, 7–5
Loss	1–7	Oct 2019	ITF Toowoomba, Australia	W25	Hard	(Australia) Maddison Inglis	1–6, 6–4, 0–6
Loss	1–8	Aug 2022	GB Pro-Series Foxhills, UK	W25	Hard (i)	(Chinese Taipei) Joanna Garland	6–3, 1–6, 2–6
Win	2–8	Aug 2022	ITF Goyang, South Korea	W25	Hard	(Thailand) Peangtarn Plipuech	1–6, 6–4, 6–3
Loss	2–9	Jul 2024	Nakhon Si Thammarat, Thailand	W35	Hard	(Thailand) Patcharin Cheapchandej	2–6, 3–6
Win	3–9	Dec 2024	ITF Nonthaburi, Thailand	W75	Hard	(Liechtenstein) Kathinka von Deichmann	7–5, 1–6, 7–5
Win	4–9	Apr 2026	ITF Osaka, Japan	W35	Hard	(United States) Hina Inoue	6–4, 6–4
Loss	4–10	May 2026	Kurume Cup, Japan	W75	Carpet	(United Kingdom) Katie Swan	5–7, 1–6
Win	5–10	Nov 2026	Keio Challenger, Japan	W50	Hard	(United Kingdom) Heather Watson	6–4, 6–4

=== Doubles: 20 (12 titles, 8 runner-ups) ===
Legend W100 tournaments W60/75 tournaments (1–3) W25/35 tournaments (8–3) W10/15 tournaments (3–2)	Finals by surface Hard (11–4) Clay (1–2) Grass (0–1) Carpet (0–1)

Result	W–L	Date	Tournament	Tier	Surface	Partner	Opponents	Score
Loss	0–1	Sep 2012	ITF Antalya, Turkey	10,000	Clay	(Romania) Bianca Hîncu	(North Macedonia) Lina Gjorcheska (Moldova) Anastasia Vdovenco	1–6, 6–2, [7–10]
Loss	0–2	May 2014	ITF Bangkok, Thailand	10,000	Hard	(Japan) Hirono Watanabe	(Thailand) Varunya Wongteanchai (Thailand) Nungnadda Wannasuk	2–6, 5–7
Win	1–2	Sep 2014	ITF Kyoto, Japan	10,000	Hard (i)	(Japan) Makoto Ninomiya	(Japan) Ayaka Okuno (Japan) Michika Ozeki	6–3, 6–3
Win	2–2	Mar 2015	ITF Nishitama, Japan	10,000	Hard	(Japan) Akiko Yonemura	(Japan) Kanae Hisami (Japan) Kotomi Takahata	2–6, 6–2, [10–5]
Loss	2–3	Sep 2015	ITF Noto, Japan	25,000	Carpet	(Japan) Chiaki Okadaue	(South Korea) Jang Su-jeong (South Korea) Lee So-ra	3–6, 6–2, [8–10]
Win	3–3	Jun 2017	ITF Tokyo, Japan	25,000	Hard	(Japan) Rika Fujiwara	(Japan) Momoko Kobori (Japan) Kotomi Takahata	6–2, 6–0
Win	4–3	Jun 2017	ITF Kōfu, Japan	25,000	Hard	(Japan) Rika Fujiwara	(Japan) Hiroko Kuwata (Japan) Riko Sawayanagi	7–6^{(4)}, 6–3
Win	5–3	Oct 2017	ITF Hamamatsu, Japan	25,000	Hard	(Japan) Rika Fujiwara	(China) Lu Jiajing (Japan) Ayaka Okuno	6–2, 6–4
Win	6–3	Apr 2018	ITF Kashiwa, Japan	25,000	Hard	(Japan) Ayaka Okuno	(South Korea) Han Na-lae (Japan) Robu Kajitani	6–2, 6–2
Loss	6–4	Nov 2018	ITF Muzaffarnagar, India	25,000	Grass	(Japan) Michika Ozeki	(Indonesia) Aldila Sutjiadi (China) Wang Danni	6–7^{(6)}, 5–7
Win	7–4	Jun 2019	Trofeu de Barcelona, Spain	W60	Clay	(Japan) Moyuka Uchijima	(Spain) Marina Bassols Ribera (Spain) Yvonne Cavallé Reimers	7–6^{(7)}, 6–4
Loss	7–5	Jun 2019	Macha Lake Open, Czech Republic	W60+H	Clay	(Serbia) Dejana Radanović	(Russia) Natela Dzalamidze (Serbia) Nina Stojanović	3–6, 3–6
Win	8–5	Jul 2019	ITF Ulanqab, China	W25	Hard	(Thailand) Peangtarn Plipuech	(China) Sun Xuliu (China) Wang Meiling	4–6, 7–5, [13–11]
Win	9–5	Feb 2021	ITF Sharm El Sheikh, Egypt	W15	Hard	(Chinese Taipei) Liang En-shuo	(Belgium) Magali Kempen (Belarus) Shalimar Talbi	1–6, 6–4, [10–3]
Win	10–5	Apr 2022	ITF Chiang Rai, Thailand	W25	Hard	(Thailand) Peangtarn Plipuech	(China) Ma Yexin (China) Xun Fangying	4–6, 6–3, [10–5]
Win	11–5	Aug 2022	ITF Goyang, South Korea	W25	Hard	(Thailand) Peangtarn Plipuech	(South Korea) Kim Da-bin (Thailand) Punnin Kovapitukted	6–1, 6–0
Loss	11–6	Nov 2023	Sydney Challenger, Australia	W60	Hard	(Japan) Ayano Shimizu	(Australia) Destanee Aiava (Australia) Maddison Inglis	0–6, 0–6
Loss	11–7	Feb 2024	Burnie International, Australia	W75	Hard	(Japan) Ayano Shimizu	(Australia) Paige Hourigan (Australia) Erin Routliffe	6–7^{(5)}, 4–6
Loss	11–8	Aug 2025	ITF Southaven, United States	W35	Hard	(Japan) Hiroko Kuwata	(United States) Catherine Harrison (United States) Ashley Lahey	3–6, 2–6
Win	12–8	Mar 2026	Launceston Tennis International, Australia	W35	Hard	(Japan) Naho Sato	(Australia) Gabriella Da Silva-Fick (Australia) Tenika McGiffin	5–7, 7–5, [14–12]
