= Zhang Jing =

Zhang Jing may refer to:

- Zhang Jing (Ming dynasty) (died 1555), Ming dynasty general

== Sportspeople ==
- Zhang Jing (speed skater) (born 1973), Chinese speed skater and coach of the Hungarian team
- Zhang Jing (ice hockey) (born 1977), Chinese ice hockey player
- Zhang Jing (volleyball) (born 1979), Chinese volleyball player
- Zhang Jing (water polo) (born 1996), Chinese water polo player
- Zhang Jing (diver), in events such as the World Aquatics Championships
- Zhang Jing (politician) (born 1982), Chinese engineer and politician, an alternate member of the 20th Central Committee of the Chinese Communist Party
