= Punnin Kovapitukted =

Thai tennis player

- Native name: พัณณิน โควาพิทักษ์เทศ
- Country (sports): Thailand
- Born: 5 February 2003 (age 23)
- Prize money: $76,113

Singles
- Career record: 159–130
- Career titles: 2 ITF
- Highest ranking: No. 470 (30 January 2023)

Doubles
- Career record: 165–97
- Career titles: 15 ITF
- Highest ranking: No. 302 (18 September 2023)

Team competitions
- Fed Cup: 5–1
- Last updated on: 1 September 2026.

Punnin Kovapitukted (Thai: พัณณิน โควาพิทักษ์เทศ; born 5 February 2003) is a Thai inactive tennis player. She has a career-high singles ranking by the WTA of 470, achieved on 30 January 2023, and a best doubles ranking of 302, achieved on 18 September 2023.

Kovapitukted has won two singles titles and fifteen doubles titles on tournaments of the ITF World Tennis Tour.

== ITF Circuit finals ==
=== Singles: 3 (2 titles, 1 runner-up) ===
Legend W35 tournaments (1–0) W15 tournaments (1–1)	Finals by surface Hard (2–1)

Result	W–L	Date	Tournament	Tier	Surface	Opponent	Score
Win	1–0	Feb 2022	ITF Gurugram, India	W15	Hard	(India) Vaidehi Chaudhari	6–1, 6–2
Loss	1–1	Mar 2025	ITF Nonthaburi, Thailand	W15	Hard	Kristina Sidorova	3–6, 2–6
Win	1–1	Aug 2025	ITF Nakhon Pathom, Thailand	W35	Hard	(Thailand) Patcharin Cheapchandej	3–6, 7–6^{(4)}, 6–1

=== Doubles: 32 (15 titles, 17 runner-ups) ===
Legend W50 tournaments W25/35 tournaments (3–7) W15 tournaments (12–10)	Finals by surface Hard (13–11) Clay (2–5) Grass (0–1)

Result	W–L	Date	Tournament	Tier	Surface	Partner	Opponents	Score
Win	1–0	Oct 2019	ITF Hua Hin, Thailand	W15	Hard	(Thailand) Patcharin Cheapchandej	(China) Kang Jiaqi (Thailand) Tamarine Tanasugarn	6–3, 6–4
Loss	1–1	Sep 2021	ITF Cairo, Egypt	W15	Clay	(Italy) Alessandra Simone	(Georgia (country)) Mariam Dalakishvili (Ukraine) Viktoriya Petrenko	1–6, 2–6
Loss	1–2	Sep 2021	ITF Cairo, Egypt	W15	Clay	(Russia) Anna Ureke	(Russia) Ecaterina Visnevscaia (Russia) Anastasia Zolotareva	5–7, 6–0, [3–10]
Loss	1–3	Oct 2021	ITF Cairo, Egypt	W15	Clay	(Netherlands) Demi Tran	(Netherlands) Jasmijn Gimbrère (Netherlands) Lian Tran	3–6, 6–3, [5–10]
Win	2–3	Oct 2021	ITF Sharm El Sheikh, Egypt	W15	Hard	(China) Bai Zhuoxuan	(India) Ashmitha Easwaramurthi (Hungary) Rebeka Stolmár	6–0, 6–4
Win	3–3	Oct 2021	ITF Sharm El Sheikh	W15	Hard	(China) Bai Zhuoxuan	(Hong Kong) Eudice Chong (Hong Kong) Cody Wong	4–6, 6–2, [10–7]
Loss	3–4	Nov 2021	ITF Sharm El Sheikh	W15	Hard	(China) Bai Zhuoxuan	(Hong Kong) Eudice Chong (Hong Kong) Cody Wong	6–4, 1–6, [4–10]
Loss	3–5	Nov 2021	ITF Sharm El Sheikh	W15	Hard	(China) Bai Zhuoxuan	(Romania) Elena-Teodora Cadar (Hong Kong) Cody Wong	2–6, 3–6
Win	4–5	Nov 2021	ITF Cairo, Egypt	W15	Hard	(China) Bai Zhuoxuan	(Kazakhstan) Yekaterina Dmitrichenko (Germany) Antonia Schmidt	6–3, 7–6^{(1)}
Win	5–5	Feb 2022	ITF Jhajjar, India	W15	Clay	(Russia) Anna Ureke	(India) Vaidehi Chaudhari (India) Mihika Yadav	7–5, 6–3
Loss	5–6	Feb 2022	ITF Gurugram, India	W15	Hard	(Russia) Anna Ureke	(India) Humera Baharmus (India) Shrivalli Bhamidipaty	3–6, 6–1, [3–10]
Win	6–6	Feb 2022	ITF Ahmedabad, India	W15	Clay	(Russia) Anna Ureke	(India) Sharmada Balu (India) Sravya Shivani Chilakalapudi	6–3, 6–1
Loss	6–7	Aug 2022	ITF Goyang, South Korea	W25	Hard	(South Korea) Kim Da-bin	(Japan) Kyōka Okamura (Thailand) Peangtarn Plipuech	1–6, 0–6
Win	7–7	Oct 2022	ITF Hua Hin, Thailand	W25	Hard	(Belgium) Sofia Costoulas	(Japan) Risa Ushijima (South Korea) Wi Hwi-won	6–1, 6–2
Win	8–7	Feb 2023	ITF Gurugram, India	W15	Hard	(India) Zeel Desai	(India) Shrivalli Bhamidipaty (India) Vaidehi Chaudhari	6–2, 6–2
Win	9–7	May 2023	ITF Goyang, South Korea	W25	Hard	(Thailand) Luksika Kumkhum	(China) Guo Hanyu (China) Tang Qianhui	6–3, 6–1, [10–6]
Loss	9–8	Jul 2023	ITF Nakhon Si Thammarat, Thailand	W15	Hard	(Thailand) Supapitch Kuearum	(Australia) Monique Barry (India) Shrivalli Bhamidipaty	3–6, 6–7^{(3)}
Win	10–8	Sep 2023	ITF Nakhon Si Thammarat, Thailand	W25	Hard	(China) Tang Qianhui	(Japan) Misaki Matsuda (Japan) Naho Sato	7–6^{(2)}, 1–6, [10–3]
Win	11–8	Oct 2023	ITF Hua Hin, Thailand	W15	Hard	(Thailand) Patcharin Cheapchandej	(China) Sun Yifan (China) Zhang Jing	7–6^{(2)}, 7–5
Loss	11–9	Nov 2023	ITF Bangalore, India	W25	Clay	(Russia) Anna Ureke	(Italy) Diletta Cherubini (Germany) Antonia Schmidt	6–4, 5–7, [4–10]
Loss	11–10	Mar 2024	ITF Mildura, Australia	W35	Grass	(China) Lu Jiajing	(Australia) Tahlia Kokkinis (Australia) Alicia Smith	7–5, 2–6, [7–10]
Win	12–10	Jul 2024	ITF Nakhon Si Thammarat, Thailand	W15	Hard	(Thailand) Patcharin Cheapchandej	(Australia) Monique Barry (Australia) Alicia Smith	6–3, 6–1
Loss	12–11	Jul 2024	ITF Nakhon Si Thammarat, Thailand	W15	Hard	(South Korea) Jeong Bo-young	(Australia) Monique Barry (Australia) Alicia Smith	4–6, 3–6
Loss	12–12	Aug 2024	ITF Aldershot, United Kingdom	W35	Hard	(Japan) Akiko Omae	(United Kingdom) Naiktha Bains (Australia) Mingge Xu	4–6, 3–6
Win	13–12	Sep 2024	ITF Singapore, Singapore	W15	Hard	(France) Tiphanie Lemaître	(Japan) Yui Chikaraishi (Japan) Mei Hasegawah	6–4, 6–1
Loss	13–13	Feb 2025	ITF Antalya, Turkey	W35	Clay	(Japan) Yuki Naito	(Chinese Taipei) Li Yu-yun (China) Li Zongyu	3–6, 3–6
Loss	13–14	Mar 2025	ITF Nonthaburi, Thailand	W35	Hard	(Japan) Yuki Naito	(India) Shrivalli Bhamidipaty (India) Vaidehi Chaudhari	4–6, 3–6
Win	14–14	Mar 2025	ITF Nonthaburi, Thailand	W15	Hard	(South Korea) Kim Na-ri	(Thailand) Patcharin Cheapchandej (Thailand) Kamonwan Yodpetch	6–4, 6–7^{(5)}, [10–7]
Win	15–14	Mar 2025	ITF Nonthaburi, Thailand	W15	Hard	(South Korea) Kim Na-ri	(Thailand) Lunda Kumhom (Thailand) Kamonwan Yodpetch	6–3, 6–0
Loss	15–15	Apr 2025	ITF Goyang, South Korea	W35	Hard	(South Korea) Kim Na-ri	(Japan) Saki Imamura (Indonesia) Janice Tjen	6–4, 0–6, [5–10]
Loss	15–16	Jun 2025	ITF Tashkent, Uzbekistan	W15	Hard	(India) Vaishnavi Adkar	Daria Khomutsianskaya; Daria Zelinskaya	4–6, 4–6
Loss	15–17	Jun 2025	ITF Tashkent, Uzbekistan	W15	Hard	(Russia) Ksenia Laskutova	Daria Khomutsianskaya; Daria Zelinskaya	6–4, 1–6, [9–11]
