= Vaidehi Chaudhari =

Indian tennis player (born 2000)

- Full name: Vaidehi Chaudhari
- Country (sports): India
- Born: 14 February 2000 (age 26)
- Plays: Right-handed
- Prize money: $89,900

Singles
- Career record: 168–102
- Career titles: 4 ITF
- Highest ranking: No. 355 (19 May 2025)
- Current ranking: No. 413 (29 June 2026)

Doubles
- Career record: 114–76
- Career titles: 5 ITF
- Highest ranking: No. 304 (6 May 2024)
- Current ranking: No. 397 (29 June 2026)

Team competitions
- Fed Cup: 3–3
- Last updated on: 29 June 2026.

Vaidehi Chaudhari (born 14 February 2000) is an Indian professional tennis player from Gujarat. She plays for the Indian women's team and is a two time Indian National champion. She has been ranked as high as 355 in the WTA singles rankings on 19 May 2025 and is the fourth highest ranked female player in India.

== Early life ==
Chaudhari is from Khandosan, Mehsana district, Gujarat. She lives and trains in Ahmedabad under coach Jignesh Rawal. She took up tennis at the age of 11, with the encouragement of her uncle, who was a police officer. He used to train her in physical fitness as well.

== Career ==
On 12 April 2025, Chaudhari won her match and helped India beat Chinese Taipei 2–1 in the Billie Jean King Cup Asia-Oceania Group 1 in Pune. She defeated 351 ranked Lin Fang-an 6–2, 5–7 and 6–4 for her second victory. Earlier, she beat Wu Ho-ching in the first tie on 11 April and India won 2–1 against Hong Kong, China, with her compatriot Shrivalli Bhamidipaty of Hyderabad also winning her singles tie.

In October 2024, she won the women's singles title in the 29th Fenesta Open National Tennis Championship at New Delhi. She defeated Maaya Revathi of Tamil Nadu 6–3, 6–3 in the final. This is her second title after her victory in 2022. In March 2023, she received wildcard along with Shrivalli Bhamidipaty to play the ITF Bengaluru women's open qualifiers, and qualified for the main draw. In February 2023, she won the W15 tournament at Baliawas, Gurugram. In the final, she defeated Sandeepti Singh, 4–6, 6–2, 6–0.
