= 2025 Mumbai Open =

- Date: 3–9 February
- Edition: 4th
- Draw: 32S / 16D / 16Q
- Prize money: $115,000
- Surface: Hard
- Location: Mumbai, India
- Venue: Cricket Club of India

Champions

Singles
- (Switzerland) Jil Teichmann

Doubles
- Amina Anshba / Elena Pridankina
- Mumbai Open

The 2025 L&T Mumbai Open was a professional women's tennis tournament played on outdoor hard courts. It was the fourth edition of the tournament which was also part of the 2025 WTA 125 tournaments. It took place from 3 to 9 February 2025 at the Cricket Club of India.

== WTA singles main-draw entrants ==
=== Seeds ===
Country	Player	Rank^{1}	Seed
~~GER~~	~~Tatjana Maria~~	~~84~~	~~1~~
CAN	Rebecca Marino	102	2
SVK	Anna Karolína Schmiedlová	115	3
LAT	Darja Semeņistaja	121	4
SUI	Jil Teichmann	128	5
JPN	Nao Hibino	124	6
FRA	Léolia Jeanjean	131	7
THA	Mananchaya Sawangkaew	132	8

- ^{1} Rankings are as of 27 January 2025.

=== Other entrants ===
The following players received wildcards into the singles main draw:

- (India) Vaishnavi Adkar
- (India) Shrivalli Bhamidipaty
- (India) Ankita Raina
- (India) Sahaja Yamalapalli

The following players received entry from the qualifying draw:

- (Serbia) Aleksandra Krunić
- (India) Maaya Rajeshwaran
- (Australia) Tina Nadine Smith
- (Japan) Mei Yamaguchi

=== Withdrawals ===
- (Germany) Tatjana Maria → replaced by (Croatia) Petra Marčinko
- (United Kingdom) Lily Miyazaki → replaced by Iryna Shymanovich
- (Liechtenstein) Kathinka von Deichmann → replaced by (United States) Jessica Failla

=== Retirements ===
During the tournament

- (United States) Emina Bektas (gastrointestinal illness)
- (Kazakhstan) Zarina Diyas (gastrointestinal illness)
- (Israel) Lina Glushko (gastrointestinal illness)
- (France) Léolia Jeanjean (left thigh injury)
- (Japan) Kyōka Okamura (gastrointestinal illness)

== WTA doubles main-draw entrants ==
=== Seeds ===
Country	Player	Country	Player	Rank^{1}	Seed
JPN	Nao Hibino	GEO	Oksana Kalashnikova	173	1
	Amina Anshba		Elena Pridankina	219	2
GBR	Eden Silva		Anastasia Tikhonova	240	3
ITA	Nicole Fossa Huergo	ITA	Camilla Rosatello	253	4

- ^{1} Rankings as of 27 January 2025.

=== Other entrants ===
The following team received a wildcard into the doubles main draw:

- (India) Shrivalli Bhamidipaty / (India) Riya Bhatia

=== Withdrawals ===
During the tournament

- (Kazakhstan) Zarina Diyas / Ekaterina Yashina (Diyas - gastrointestinal illness)
- (United Kingdom) Maia Lumsden / (Switzerland) Simona Waltert (Lumsden - gastrointestinal illness)

== Champions ==
=== Singles ===
- (Switzerland) Jil Teichmann def. (Thailand) Mananchaya Sawangkaew, 6–3, 6–4

=== Doubles ===
- Amina Anshba / Elena Pridankina def. (Netherlands) Arianne Hartono / (India) Prarthana Thombare, 7–6^{(7–4)}, 2–6, [10–7]
