= 2025 Mumbai Open – Singles =

Singles
- 2025 Mumbai Open

Final
- Champion: (Switzerland) Jil Teichmann
- Runner-up: (Thailand) Mananchaya Sawangkaew
- Score: 6–3, 6–4

Events
Singles	Doubles
← 2024 ·	Mumbai Open	· 2026 →

Darja Semeņistaja was the defending champion, but lost in the first round to Zarina Diyas.

Jil Teichmann won the title, defeating Mananchaya Sawangkaew in the final, 6–3, 6–4.

== Seeds ==
1. (Germany) Tatjana Maria (withdrew)
2. (Canada) Rebecca Marino (semifinals)
3. (Slovakia) Anna Karolína Schmiedlová (second round)
4. (Latvia) Darja Semeņistaja (first round)
5. (Switzerland) Jil Teichmann (champion)
6. (Japan) Nao Hibino (first round)
7. (France) Léolia Jeanjean (first round, retired)
8. (Thailand) Mananchaya Sawangkaew (final)

== Draw ==
=== Key ===
- Q = Qualifier
- WC = Wild card
- LL = Lucky loser
- Alt = Alternate
- ITF = ITF entry
- PR = Protected ranking
- SR = Special ranking
- SE = Special exempt
- JE = Junior exempt
- JR = Junior Accelerator Programme entrant
- CO = College Accelerator Programme entrant
- NG = Next Gen Accelerator Program entrant
- w/o = Walkover
- r = Retired
- d = Defaulted

=== Finals ===
Semifinals
5	(Switzerland) Jil Teichmann	6	6
Q	(India) Maaya Rajeshwaran	3	1
8	(Thailand) Mananchaya Sawangkaew	6	6
2	(Canada) Rebecca Marino	2	2

Final
5	(Switzerland) Jil Teichmann	6	6
8	(Thailand) Mananchaya Sawangkaew	3	4

=== Top half ===
First round
LL	(Croatia) P Marčinko	4	2
Q	(Serbia) A Krunić	6	6
E Pridankina	1	0
WC	(India) S Bhamidipaty	6	6
(Japan) K Okamura	6	6^{4}	0^{r}
(Netherlands) A Hartono	3	7^{7}	5
(United States) E Bektas	1	0^{r}
5	(Switzerland) J Teichmann	6	0
4	(Latvia) D Semeņistaja	3	3
(Kazakhstan) Z Diyas	6	6
LL	I Shymanovich	4	1
Q	(India) M Rajeshwaran	6	6
Q	(Japan) M Yamaguchi	6	5
(Israel) L Glushko	3	4^{r}
(Switzerland) S Waltert	3
7	(France) L Jeanjean	0^{r}

Second round
Q	(Serbia) A Krunić	4	0
WC	(India) S Bhamidipaty	6	6
(Netherlands) A Hartono	7^{7}	3	3
5	(Switzerland) J Teichmann	6^{4}	6	6
(Kazakhstan) Z Diyas	3	2^{r}
Q	(India) M Rajeshwaran	6	3
Q	(Japan) M Yamaguchi	7^{7}	2	6
(Switzerland) S Waltert	6^{3}	6	4

Quarterfinals
WC	(India) S Bhamidipaty	2	2
5	(Switzerland) J Teichmann	6	6
Q	(India) M Rajeshwaran	6	3	6
Q	(Japan) M Yamaguchi	4	6	2

Semifinals
5	(Switzerland) J Teichmann	6	6
Q	(India) M Rajeshwaran	3	1

=== Bottom half ===
First round
8	(Thailand) M Sawangkaew	6	6
(Slovenia) D Jakupović	3	1
(Czech Republic) L Fruhvirtová	6	4	6
LL	(United States) J Failla	3	6	4
WC	(India) S Yamalapalli	3	6	1
(Thailand) L Tararudee	6	4	6
Q	(Australia) TN Smith	7^{7}	4	1
3	(Slovakia) AK Schmiedlová	6^{2}	6	6
6	(Japan) N Hibino	6^{4}	2
(Japan) M Hontama	7^{7}	6
(Japan) S Saito	1	0
(Philippines) A Eala	6	6
WC	(India) A Raina	6	6
WC	(India) V Adkar	2	2
(Czech Republic) S Bejlek	0	2
2	(Canada) R Marino	6	6

Second round
8	(Thailand) M Sawangkaew	4	6	6
(Czech Republic) L Fruhvirtová	6	2	0
(Thailand) L Tararudee	7^{7}	6
3	(Slovakia) AK Schmiedlová	6^{5}	4
(Japan) M Hontama	7^{7}	6
(Philippines) A Eala	6^{5}	2
WC	(India) A Raina	5	6	6^{5}
2	(Canada) R Marino	7	2	7^{7}

Quarterfinals
8	(Thailand) M Sawangkaew	7	3	6
(Thailand) L Tararudee	5	6	2
(Japan) M Hontama	3	4
2	(Canada) R Marino	6	6

Semifinals
8	(Thailand) M Sawangkaew	6	6
2	(Canada) R Marino	2	2

== Qualifying ==
=== Seeds ===
1. Iryna Shymanovich (first round, lucky loser)
2. (Croatia) Petra Marčinko (qualifying competition, retired, lucky loser)
3. (Italy) Nicole Fossa Huergo (first round)
4. (Japan) Mei Yamaguchi (qualified)
5. (Australia) Tina Nadine Smith (qualified)
6. Anastasia Tikhonova (first round)
7. (Serbia) Aleksandra Krunić (qualified)
8. Alevtina Ibragimova (qualifying competition)

=== Qualifiers ===
1. (Australia) Tina Nadine Smith
2. (Serbia) Aleksandra Krunić
3. (India) Maaya Rajeshwaran
4. (Japan) Mei Yamaguchi

=== Lucky losers ===
1. (Croatia) Petra Marčinko
2. Iryna Shymanovich
3. (United States) Jessica Failla

=== Qualifying draw ===
==== First qualifier ====
First round
1	Iryna Shymanovich	3	7	3
Daria Kudashova	6	5	6
(Italy) Camilla Rosatello	2	7^{7}	5
5	(Australia) Tina Nadine Smith	6	6^{2}	7

Qualifying competition
Daria Kudashova	3	7	4
5	(Australia) Tina Nadine Smith	6	5	6

==== Second qualifier ====
First round
2	(Croatia) Petra Marčinko	6	6
(United States) Alana Smith	1	3
(Japan) Naho Sato	2	3
7	(Serbia) Aleksandra Krunić	6	6

Qualifying competition
2	(Croatia) Petra Marčinko	1^{r}
7	(Serbia) Aleksandra Krunić	2

==== Third qualifier ====
First round
3	(Italy) Nicole Fossa Huergo	3	6	0
WC	(India) Maaya Rajeshwaran	6	3	6
(United States) Jessica Failla	2	6	6
6	Anastasia Tikhonova	6	4	3

Qualifying competition
WC	(India) Maaya Rajeshwaran	7^{11}	1	6
(United States) Jessica Failla	6^{9}	6	4

==== Fourth qualifier ====
First round
4	(Japan) Mei Yamaguchi	6	6
WC	(India) Akanksha Dileep Nitture	0	1
(Indonesia) Priska Madelyn Nugroho	6	4	4
8	Alevtina Ibragimova	1	6	6

Qualifying competition
4	(Japan) Mei Yamaguchi	4	6	7^{8}
8	Alevtina Ibragimova	6	3	6^{6}
