= 2026 Mumbai Open =

- Date: 2–8 February
- Edition: 5th
- Draw: 32S / 8D / 16Q
- Prize money: $115,000
- Surface: Hard
- Location: Mumbai, India
- Venue: Cricket Club of India

Champions

Singles
- (Thailand) Mananchaya Sawangkaew

Doubles
- Polina Iatcenko / Elena Pridankina
- Mumbai Open

The 2026 L&T Mumbai Open was a professional women's tennis tournament played on outdoor hard courts. It was the fifth edition of the tournament which was also part of the 2026 WTA 125 tournaments. It took place at the Cricket Club of India from 2 to 8 February 2026.

== WTA singles main-draw entrants ==
=== Seeds ===
Country	Player	Rank^{1}	Seed
~~NZL~~	~~Lulu Sun~~	~~86~~	~~1~~
LAT	Darja Semeņistaja	98	2
FRA	Léolia Jeanjean	103	3
BEL	Hanne Vandewinkel	125	4
THA	Lanlana Tararudee	131	5
~~UZB~~	~~Polina Kudermetova~~	~~150~~	~~6~~
AUT	Lilli Tagger	155	7
	Polina Iatcenko	159	8
	Tatiana Prozorova	174	9

- ^{1} Rankings are as of 19 January 2026.

=== Other entrants ===
The following players received wildcards into the singles main draw:

- (India) Vaishnavi Adkar
- (India) Shrivalli Bhamidipaty
- (India) Vaidehi Chaudhari
- (India) Maaya Rajeshwaran

The following players received entry from the qualifying draw:

- (Japan) Misaki Matsuda
- (Poland) Zuzanna Pawlikowska
- (Thailand) Peangtarn Plipuech
- Kristiana Sidorova

The following players received entry as lucky losers:

- (Argentina) Nicole Fossa Huergo
- (Morocco) Yasmine Kabbaj
- (India) Ankita Raina

=== Withdrawals ===
Before the tournament

- (Spain) Marina Bassols Ribera → replaced by (Italy) Diletta Cherubini
- (Australia) Kimberly Birrell → replaced by (India) Sahaja Yamalapalli
- (Chinese Taipei) Joanna Garland → replaced by (China) Tian Fangran
- (Japan) Haruka Kaji → replaced by (Japan) Eri Shimizu
- (France) Carole Monnet → replaced by (Japan) Miho Kuramochi
- (Uzbekistan) Polina Kudermetova → replaced by (Argentina) Nicole Fossa Huergo (LL)
- (Netherlands) Arantxa Rus → replaced by (Indonesia) Priska Nugroho
- (New Zealand) Lulu Sun → replaced by (India) Ankita Raina (LL)
- (Croatia) Tara Würth → replaced by (Slovakia) Viktória Morvayová

=== Retirement ===
- (United Kingdom) Mingge Xu (illness)

== WTA doubles main-draw entrants ==
=== Seeds ===
Country	Player	Country	Player	Rank^{1}	Seed
IND	Rutuja Bhosale	THA	Peangtarn Plipuech	259	1
	Polina Iatcenko		Elena Pridankina	350	2

- ^{1} Rankings as of 19 January 2026.

=== Other entrants ===
The following team received a wildcard into the doubles main draw:

- (India) Shrivalli Bhamidipaty / (India) Ankita Raina

== Champions ==
=== Singles ===
- (Thailand) Mananchaya Sawangkaew def. (Austria) Lilli Tagger 6–4, 6–3

=== Doubles ===
- Polina Iatcenko / Elena Pridankina def. (Argentina) Nicole Fossa Huergo / (Thailand) Mananchaya Sawangkaew 7–6^{(7–3)}, 1–6, [10–5]
