= 2025 Jiangxi Open – Singles =

Singles
- 2025 Jiangxi Open

Final
- Champion: Anna Blinkova
- Runner-up: (Austria) Lilli Tagger
- Score: 6–3, 6–3

Details
- Draw: 32 (4Q / 4WC)
- Seeds: 8

Events
Singles	Doubles
- Jiangxi Open

Anna Blinkova defeated Lilli Tagger in the final, 6–3, 6–3 to win the singles tennis title at the 2025 Jiangxi Open. She did not lose a set en route to her second WTA Tour title, and first since 2022.

Viktorija Golubic was the defending champion, but lost in the semifinals to Tagger. Tagger became the first player born in 2008 to reach a WTA final, and the first player to reach the final on her first tour-level main draw appearance since Noma Noha Akugue at the 2023 Hamburg Open.

== Seeds ==
1. (United States) Ann Li (first round)
2. (Switzerland) Viktorija Golubic (semifinals)
3. (United States) Alycia Parks (quarterfinals)
4. Polina Kudermetova (first round, retired)
5. (Kazakhstan) Yulia Putintseva (quarterfinals)
6. (Hungary) Anna Bondár (second round)
7. (Colombia) Camila Osorio (first round, retired)
8. Anastasia Zakharova (second round)

== Draw ==
Key

- Q = Qualifier
- WC = Wild card
- LL = Lucky loser
- Alt = Alternate
- ITF = ITF entry
- PR = Protected ranking
- SR = Special ranking
- SE = Special exempt
- JE = Junior exempt
- JR = Junior Accelerator Programme entrant
- CO = College Accelerator Programme entrant
- NG = Next Gen Accelerator Program entrant
- w/o = Walkover
- r = Retired
- d = Defaulted

=== Finals ===
Semifinals
(Czech Republic) Dominika Šalková	4	4
Anna Blinkova	6	6
WC	(Austria) Lilli Tagger	6	4	7
2	(Switzerland) Viktorija Golubic	1	6	5

Final
Anna Blinkova	6	6
WC	(Austria) Lilli Tagger	3	3

=== Top half ===
First round
1	(United States) A Li	3	1
PR	(China) Z Bai	6	6
Q	(China) H Guo	3	6	7^{8}
PR	A Korneeva	6	2	6^{6}
(Czech Republic) D Šalková	7^{7}	7
Q	A Falei	6^{2}	5
(Japan) E Shibahara	4	1
8	A Zakharova	6	6
3	(United States) A Parks	6	2
WC	(China) L Zhu	3	1^{r}
(Slovenia) K Juvan	3	6	7
PR	(United States) C Liu	6	2	5
A Blinkova	6	6
Q	(France) C Paquet	4	4
(China) S Wei	2	2
6	(Hungary) A Bondár	6	6

Second round
PR	(China) Z Bai	3	7	6
Q	(China) H Guo	6	5	4
(Czech Republic) D Šalková	7^{7}	2	6
8	A Zakharova	6^{4}	6	2
3	(United States) A Parks	1	6	6
(Slovenia) K Juvan	6	1	1
A Blinkova	7^{7}	7
6	(Hungary) A Bondár	6^{3}	5

Quarterfinals
PR	(China) Z Bai	3	4
(Czech Republic) D Šalková	6	6
3	(United States) A Parks	5	5
A Blinkova	7	7

Semifinals
(Czech Republic) D Šalková	4	4
A Blinkova	6	6

=== Bottom half ===
First round
7	(Colombia) C Osorio	2	0^{r}
(Italy) E Cocciaretto	6	3
WC	(Austria) L Tagger	6	6
WC	(China) C Zhu	2	1
(Germany) E Seidel	6	6
(France) T Rakotomanga Rajaonah	4	3
(Germany) T Korpatsch	3
4	P Kudermetova	0^{r}
5	(Kazakhstan) Y Putintseva	6	6
(Andorra) V Jiménez Kasintseva	3	1
WC	(China) W Zheng	6	7^{7}
(Ukraine) Y Starodubtseva	3	6^{5}
(China) Y Yuan	2	6	6^{5}
LL	E Pridankina	6	3	7^{7}
Q	(Japan) R Saigo	2	4
2	(Switzerland) V Golubic	6	6

Second round
(Italy) E Cocciaretto	4	2
WC	(Austria) L Tagger	6	6
(Germany) E Seidel	6	0	1
(Germany) T Korpatsch	3	6	6
5	(Kazakhstan) Y Putintseva	6	6
WC	(China) W Zheng	2	0
LL	E Pridankina	0	6	5
2	(Switzerland) V Golubic	6	4	7

Quarterfinals
WC	(Austria) L Tagger	6	6
(Germany) T Korpatsch	3	4
5	(Kazakhstan) Y Putintseva	5	2
2	(Switzerland) V Golubic	7	6

Semifinals
WC	(Austria) L Tagger	6	4	7
2	(Switzerland) V Golubic	1	6	5

== Qualifying ==
=== Seeds ===
1. (China) Gao Xinyu (qualifying competition)
2. (China) Guo Hanyu (qualified)
3. Elena Pridankina (qualifying competition, lucky loser)
4. (United States) Carol Young Suh Lee (qualifying competition)
5. (France) Chloé Paquet (qualified)
6. (China) Shi Han (qualifying competition)
7. (China) Yao Xinxin (first round)
8. Aliona Falei (qualified)

=== Qualifiers ===
1. Aliona Falei
2. (China) Guo Hanyu
3. (Japan) Rina Saigo
4. (France) Chloé Paquet

=== Lucky loser ===
1. Elena Pridankina

=== Qualifying draw ===
==== First qualifier ====
First round
1	(China) Gao Xinyu	6	6
(China) Yang Yidi	1	3
WC	(China) Wang Yuhan	6	2	6^{6}
8	Aliona Falei	4	6	7^{8}

Qualifying competition
1	(China) Gao Xinyu	6^{5}	1
8	Aliona Falei	7^{7}	6

==== Second qualifier ====
First round
2	(China) Guo Hanyu	7^{8}	6
Ekaterina Ovcharenko	6^{6}	3
(China) Ren Yufei	0	0
6	(China) Shi Han	6	6

Qualifying competition
2	(China) Guo Hanyu	6	6
6	(China) Shi Han	3	2

==== Third qualifier ====
First round
3	Elena Pridankina	6	4	7
(China) Li Zongyu	0	6	5
(Japan) Rina Saigo	6	6
7	(China) Yao Xinxin	2	4

Qualifying competition
3	Elena Pridankina	2	3
(Japan) Rina Saigo	6	6

==== Fourth qualifier ====
First round
4	(United States) Carol Young Suh Lee	6	6
WC	(China) Wang Jiaqi	3	2
Darya Astakhova	4	4
5	(France) Chloé Paquet	6	6

Qualifying competition
4	(United States) Carol Young Suh Lee	1	6^{5}
5	(France) Chloé Paquet	6	7^{7}
