= 2026 Mumbai Open – Doubles =

Doubles
- 2026 Mumbai Open

Final
- Champions: Polina Iatcenko; Elena Pridankina
- Runners-up: (Argentina) Nicole Fossa Huergo (Thailand) Mananchaya Sawangkaew
- Score: 7–6^{(7–3)}, 1–6, [10–5]

Details
- Draw: 8 (1 WC)
- Seeds: 2

Events
Singles	Doubles
- Mumbai Open

Amina Anshba and Elena Pridankina were the defending champions, but Anshba chose not to compete.

Pridankina partnered Polina Iatcenko and successfully defended her title, defeating Nicole Fossa Huergo and Mananchaya Sawangkaew 7–6^{(7–3)}, 1–6, [10–5] in the final.

== Seeds ==
1. (India) Rutuja Bhosale / (Thailand) Peangtarn Plipuech (quarterfinals)
2. Polina Iatcenko / Elena Pridankina (champions)

== Draw ==
Key

- Q = Qualifier
- WC = Wild card
- LL = Lucky loser
- Alt = Alternate
- ITF = ITF entry
- PR = Protected ranking
- SR = Special ranking
- SE = Special exempt
- JE = Junior exempt
- JR = Junior Accelerator Programme entrant
- CO = College Accelerator Programme entrant
- NG = Next Gen Accelerator Program entrant
- w/o = Walkover
- r = Retired
- d = Defaulted

=== Draw ===
Quarterfinals
1	(India) R Bhosale (Thailand) P Plipuech	6	1	[9]
(Argentina) N Fossa Huergo (Thailand) M Sawangkaew	4	6	[11]
(Poland) Z Pawlikowska (Latvia) D Semeņistaja	0	4
(Japan) H Kuwata (South Korea) S-h Park	6	6
(France) L Jeanjean (Switzerland) N Karamoko	6	6
WC	(India) S Bhamidipaty (India) A Raina	4	2
A Ibragimova (India) P Thombare	1	1
2	P Iatcenko; E Pridankina	6	6

Semifinals
(Argentina) N Fossa Huergo (Thailand) M Sawangkaew	6	6^{4}	[10]
(Japan) H Kuwata (South Korea) S-h Park	4	7^{7}	[5]
(France) L Jeanjean (Switzerland) N Karamoko	6	4	[2]
2	P Iatcenko; E Pridankina	2	6	[10]

Final
(Argentina) N Fossa Huergo (Thailand) M Sawangkaew	6^{3}	6	[5]
2	P Iatcenko; E Pridankina	7^{7}	1	[10]
