= 2026 Cincinnati Open – Women's singles =

Women's singles
- 2026 Cincinnati Open

Final
- Champion: (United States) Coco Gauff
- Runner-up: (United States) Jessica Pegula
- Score: 6–2, 6–4
- Date: 23 August 2026

Details
- Draw: 96
- Seeds: 32

Events
Singles	men	women
Doubles	men	women
- Cincinnati Open

Coco Gauff defeated Jessica Pegula in the final, 6–2, 6–4 to win the women's singles tennis title at the 2026 Cincinnati Open. It was her second title at the Cincinnati Open (after 2023), fourth WTA 1000 title and twelfth career WTA Tour title overall. She became only the third woman in the Open Era to win multiple Cincinnati Open singles titles, after Serena Williams and Victoria Azarenka. This was the first all-American women's singles final at the tournament since 1970.

Iga Świątek was the defending champion, but lost in the semifinals to Pegula.

Aryna Sabalenka retained the WTA No. 1 singles ranking after Elena Rybakina retired in the quarterfinals.

== Seeds ==
All seeds received a bye into the second round.

1. Aryna Sabalenka (fourth round)
2. (Kazakhstan) Elena Rybakina (quarterfinals, retired)
3. (United States) Jessica Pegula (final)
4. (United States) Coco Gauff (champion)
5. Mirra Andreeva (fourth round)
6. (Czech Republic) Linda Nosková (fourth round)
7. (Poland) Iga Świątek (semifinals)
8. (Ukraine) Elina Svitolina (third round, withdrew)
9. (United States) Amanda Anisimova (quarterfinals)
10. (Ukraine) Marta Kostyuk (quarterfinals)
11. (Japan) Naomi Osaka (withdrew)
12. (Switzerland) Belinda Bencic (second round, retired)
13. (United States) Iva Jovic (third round)
14. Diana Shnaider (fourth round)
15. (Romania) Sorana Cîrstea (fourth round)
16. Ekaterina Alexandrova (third round)
17. (Philippines) Alexandra Eala (third round)
18. Anna Kalinskaya (third round, retired)
19. (Poland) Maja Chwalińska (third round)
20. (United States) Madison Keys (quarterfinals)
21. (Belgium) Elise Mertens (second round)
22. (Czech Republic) Marie Bouzková (fourth round)
23. (Czech Republic) Barbora Krejčiková (second round)
24. (Austria) Anastasia Potapova (second round)
25. (United States) Emma Navarro (third round)
26. (Latvia) Jeļena Ostapenko (second round)
27. (Denmark) Clara Tauson (third round)
28. (United States) Ann Li (third round)
29. (Greece) Maria Sakkari (third round)
30. (Canada) Leylah Fernandez (second round)
31. (Croatia) Donna Vekić (second round)
32. (Indonesia) Janice Tjen (third round)
33. (Czech Republic) Kateřina Siniaková (third round)

Click on the seed number of a player to go to their draw section.

== Draw ==
Key

- Q = Qualifier
- WC = Wild card
- LL = Lucky loser
- Alt = Alternate
- ITF = ITF entry
- PR = Protected ranking
- SR = Special ranking
- SE = Special exempt
- JE = Junior exempt
- JR = Junior Accelerator Programme entrant
- CO = College Accelerator Programme entrant
- NG = Next Gen Accelerator Program entrant
- w/o = Walkover
- r = Retired
- d = Defaulted

=== Finals ===
Quarterfinals
(Czech Republic) Sára Bejlek	3	6	7^{7}
20	(United States) Madison Keys	6	4	6^{5}
4	(United States) Coco Gauff	6	6
10	(Ukraine) Marta Kostyuk	2	2
9	(United States) Amanda Anisimova	4	6	6^{4}
3	(United States) Jessica Pegula	6	2	7^{7}
7	(Poland) Iga Świątek	4
2	(Kazakhstan) Elena Rybakina	1^{r}

Semifinals
(Czech Republic) Sára Bejlek	4	1
4	(United States) Coco Gauff	6	6
3	(United States) Jessica Pegula	7	4	6
7	(Poland) Iga Świątek	5	6	4

Final
4	(United States) Coco Gauff	6	6
3	(United States) Jessica Pegula	2	4

=== Top half ===
==== Section 1 ====
First round
Q	(Austria) L Tagger	6	1	5
(Australia) T Gibson	4	6	7
(China) Xin Wang	6	6
(Belgium) H Vandewinkel	4	3
(Czech Republic) S Bejlek	6	6
(Czech Republic) Ka Plíšková	0	2
Q	(Thailand) M Sawangkaew	6	2	3
Q	A Blinkova	1	6	6

Second round
1	A Sabalenka	6	7^{7}
(Australia) T Gibson	2	6^{2}
(China) Xin Wang	3	6	6
31	(Croatia) D Vekić	6	1	4
23	(Czech Republic) B Krejčíková	6^{5}	4
(Czech Republic) S Bejlek	7^{7}	6
Q	A Blinkova	7^{7}	4	5
16	E Alexandrova	6^{5}	6	7

Third round
1	A Sabalenka	6	6
(China) Xin Wang	1	3
(Czech Republic) S Bejlek	4	6	6
16	E Alexandrova	6	1	2

Fourth round
1	A Sabalenka	6^{7}	4
(Czech Republic) S Bejlek	7^{9}	6

==== Section 2 ====
First round
(Spain) J Bouzas Maneiro	6	7^{7}
(Hungary) A Bondár	3	6^{5}
(Ukraine) D Snigur	6	6
(Ukraine) Y Starodubtseva	4	3
(Uzbekistan) M Timofeeva	0	0^{r}
Q	(China) Xiy Wang	6	3
Q	(United States) M Stoiana	2	6^{4}
(Czech Republic) T Valentová	6	7^{7}

Second round
33	(Czech Republic) K Siniaková	6^{5}	6	6
(Spain) J Bouzas Maneiro	7^{7}	1	1
(Ukraine) D Snigur	6	3	3
20	(United States) M Keys	4	6	6
30	(Canada) L Fernandez	6	2	2
Q	(China) Xiy Wang	3	6	6
(Czech Republic) T Valentová	6	6^{5}	0
8	(Ukraine) E Svitolina	3	7^{7}	6

Third round
33	(Czech Republic) K Siniaková	1	3
20	(United States) M Keys	6	6
Q	(China) Xiy Wang	w/o
8	(Ukraine) E Svitolina

Fourth round
20	(United States) M Keys	7^{7}	6
Q	(China) Xiy Wang	6^{3}	4

==== Section 3 ====
First round
(Kazakhstan) Y Putintseva	6^{5}	7	5
L Samsonova	7^{7}	5	7
(China) S Zhang	2	6	6
Q	(United States) K Day	6	2	2
(Italy) E Cocciaretto	3^{r}
Q	(Italy) L Stefanini	5
(Australia) M Joint	6	3	4
(Germany) T Korpatsch	0	6	6

Second round
4	(United States) C Gauff	2	6	6
L Samsonova	6	4	1
(China) S Zhang	5	3
28	(United States) A Li	7	6
22	(Czech Republic) M Bouzková	6	6
Q	(Italy) L Stefanini	2	4
(Germany) T Korpatsch	4	3
13	(United States) I Jovic	6	6

Third round
4	(United States) C Gauff	6	7^{7}
28	(United States) A Li	1	6^{3}
22	(Czech Republic) M Bouzková	7^{7}	7^{7}
13	(United States) I Jovic	6^{0}	6^{5}

Fourth round
4	(United States) C Gauff	6	6
22	(Czech Republic) M Bouzková	3	2

==== Section 4 ====
First round
WC	(United States) S Kenin	1	6	6
LL	(Germany) E Lys	6	3	3
WC	(United States) S Stephens	7	6
Q	(Austria) S Kraus	5	3
(United States) A Parks	2	2
(Switzerland) V Golubic	6	6
WC	(United States) E Kalieva	4	1
(Ukraine) O Oliynykova	6	6

Second round
10	(Ukraine) M Kostyuk	4	6	7
WC	(United States) S Kenin	6	3	5
WC	(United States) S Stephens	6	6
24	(Austria) A Potapova	2	4
32	(Indonesia) J Tjen	7^{10}	5	7
(Switzerland) V Golubic	6^{8}	7	5
(Ukraine) O Oliynykova	1	0
5	M Andreeva	6	6

Third round
10	(Ukraine) M Kostyuk	7	7
WC	(United States) S Stephens	5	5
32	(Indonesia) J Tjen	1	6^{5}
5	M Andreeva	6	7^{7}

Fourth round
10	(Ukraine) M Kostyuk	4	6	6
5	M Andreeva	6	0	2

=== Bottom half ===
==== Section 5 ====
First round
(United Kingdom) K Boulter	7	0	6
WC	(United States) K Volynets	5	6	4
(United States) P Stearns	6	7^{8}
Q	(United Kingdom) H Dart	1	6^{6}
(Romania) E-G Ruse	6	6
(Poland) M Linette	0	3
(Australia) D Kasatkina	6	6^{4}	3
(Turkey) Z Sönmez	2	7^{7}	6

Second round
6	(Czech Republic) L Nosková	6	6
(United Kingdom) K Boulter	3	3
(United States) P Stearns	6^{7}	6	5
27	(Denmark) C Tauson	7^{9}	1	7
17	(Philippines) A Eala	6	3
(Romania) E-G Ruse	1	0^{r}
(Turkey) Z Sönmez	2	3
9	(United States) A Anisimova	6	6

Third round
6	(Czech Republic) L Nosková	7^{7}	6
27	(Denmark) C Tauson	6^{3}	2
17	(Philippines) A Eala	6	4	2
9	(United States) A Anisimova	4	6	6

Fourth round
6	(Czech Republic) L Nosková	1	4
9	(United States) A Anisimova	6	6

==== Section 6 ====
First round
(Czech Republic) N Bartůňková	4	6	6
Q	(Armenia) A Charaeva	6	4	3
(United States) C McNally	6	6
(United States) M Kessler	3	4
WC	(Czech Republic) D Vidmanova	6	4	2
(Ukraine) A Kalinina	4	6	6
(Switzerland) S Waltert	5	6	6
(Croatia) P Marčinko	7	4	2

Second round
15	(Romania) S Cîrstea	7^{7}	6
(Czech Republic) N Bartůňková	6^{5}	3
(United States) C McNally	3	4
18	A Kalinskaya	6	6
25	(United States) E Navarro	3	6	6
(Ukraine) A Kalinina	6	4	2
(Switzerland) S Waltert	3	2
3	(United States) J Pegula	6	6

Third round
15	(Romania) S Cîrstea	6^{4}	6	5
18	A Kalinskaya	7^{7}	1	0^{r}
25	(United States) E Navarro	5	2
3	(United States) J Pegula	7	6

Fourth round
15	(Romania) S Cîrstea	2	6	5
3	(United States) J Pegula	6	4	7

==== Section 7 ====
First round
Q	(Colombia) E Arango	6	6
WC	(United States) V Williams	2	2
(Uzbekistan) K Rakhimova	6	6
(Australia) K Birrell	2	2
(France) D Parry	6	7^{9}
WC	(United States) C Dolehide	4	6^{7}
(United States) A Krueger	3	2
WC	(France) L Boisson	6	6

Second round
7	(Poland) I Świątek	6	6
Q	(Colombia) E Arango	3	0
(Uzbekistan) K Rakhimova	2	7	1
29	(Greece) M Sakkari	6	5	6
21	(Belgium) E Mertens	6	2	2
(France) D Parry	2	6	6
WC	(France) L Boisson	6	0
12	(Switzerland) B Bencic	3	0^{r}

Third round
7	(Poland) I Świątek	4	6	6
29	(Greece) M Sakkari	6	1	1
(France) D Parry	4	6	6
WC	(France) L Boisson	6	4	3

Fourth round
7	(Poland) I Świątek	6	6
(France) D Parry	3	3

==== Section 8 ====
First round
(Germany) T Maria	6	6
(Ukraine) D Yastremska	1	2
(Spain) C Bucșa	6	1	7
(Hungary) P Udvardy	2	6	5
(Croatia) A Ružić	2	5
(Poland) M Fręch	6	7
(United States) T Townsend	3	6	6
(Colombia) C Osorio	6	3	3

Second round
14	D Shnaider	6	7
(Germany) T Maria	2	5
(Spain) C Bucșa	2	2
19	(Poland) M Chwalińska	6	6
26	(Latvia) J Ostapenko	1	3
(Poland) M Fręch	6	6
(United States) T Townsend	3	4
2	(Kazakhstan) E Rybakina	6	6

Third round
14	D Shnaider	6	7^{7}
19	(Poland) M Chwalińska	2	6^{3}
(Poland) M Fręch	4	6^{2}
2	(Kazakhstan) E Rybakina	6	7^{7}

Fourth round
14	D Shnaider	4	4
2	(Kazakhstan) E Rybakina	6	6

== Seeded players ==
The following are the seeded players. Seedings are based on WTA rankings as of August 3, 2026. Rankings and points before are as of August 10, 2026.

Because the tournament takes place one week later this year, the points defending column also includes results from tournaments which took place during the week of August 18, 2025 (Monterrey and Cleveland).

^{‡}	Champion
^{†}	Runner-up

Seed	Rank	Player	Points before	Points defending	Points earned	Points after	Status
1	1	Aryna Sabalenka	8,670	215	120	8,575	Fourth round lost to (Czech Republic) Sára Bejlek
2	2	(Kazakhstan) Elena Rybakina	8,316	390	215	8,141	Quarterfinals retired against (Poland) Iga Świątek [7]
3	3	(United States) Jessica Pegula^{†}	6,680	65	650	7,265	Runner-up, lost to (United States) Coco Gauff [4]
4	4	(United States) Coco Gauff^{‡}	5,919	215	1,000	6,704	Champion, defeated (United States) Jessica Pegula [3]
5	6	Mirra Andreeva	5,323	0	120	5,443	Fourth round lost to (Ukraine) Marta Kostyuk [10]
6	8	(Czech Republic) Linda Nosková	5,016	10+108	120+10	5,028	Fourth round lost to (United States) Amanda Anisimova [9]
7	5	(Poland) Iga Świątek	5,419	1,000	390	4,809	Semifinals lost to (United States) Jessica Pegula [3]
8	9	(Ukraine) Elina Svitolina	4,634	10	65	4,689	Third round withdrew due to right ankle injury
9	10	(United States) Amanda Anisimova	4,353	35	215	4,533	Quarterfinals lost to (United States) Jessica Pegula [3]
10	11	(Ukraine) Marta Kostyuk	3,830	65	215	3,980	Quarterfinals lost to (United States) Coco Gauff [4]
11	13	(Japan) Naomi Osaka	2,846	0	0	2,846	Withdrew due to fatigue
12	12	(Switzerland) Belinda Bencic	2,995	10	10	2,995	Second round retired against (France) Loïs Boisson [WC]
13	16	(United States) Iva Jovic	2,691	85	65	2,671	Third round lost to (Czech Republic) Marie Bouzková [22]
14	14	Diana Shnaider	2,798	10+500	120+60	2,468	Fourth round lost to (Kazakhstan) Elena Rybakina [2]
15	19	(Romania) Sorana Cîrstea	2,502	120+268	120+60	2,294	Fourth round lost to (United States) Jessica Pegula [3]
16	18	Ekaterina Alexandrova	2,506	120+325	65+60	2,186	Third round lost to (Czech Republic) Sára Bejlek
17	20	(Philippines) Alexandra Eala	2,216	0	65	2,281	Third round lost to (United States) Amanda Anisimova [9]
18	21	Anna Kalinskaya	2,083	215	65	1,933	Third round retired against (Romania) Sorana Cîrstea [15]
19	23	(Poland) Maja Chwalińska	1,984	(12)^{∆}	65	2,037	Third round lost to Diana Shnaider [14]
20	24	(United States) Madison Keys	1,814	120	215	1,909	Quarterfinals lost to (Czech Republic) Sára Bejlek
21	22	(Belgium) Elise Mertens	2,003	65+108	10+30	1,870	Second round lost to (France) Diane Parry
22	27	(Czech Republic) Marie Bouzková	1,774	0+195	120+54	1,753	Fourth round lost to (United States) Coco Gauff [4]
23	26	(Czech Republic) Barbora Krejčiková	1,776	120	10	1,666	Second round lost to (Czech Republic) Sára Bejlek
24	25	(Austria) Anastasia Potapova	1,781	35	10	1,756	Second round lost to (United States) Sloane Stephens [WC]
25	28	(United States) Emma Navarro	1,669	10	65	1,724	Third round lost to (United States) Jessica Pegula [3]
26	30	(Latvia) Jeļena Ostapenko	1,537	35	10	1,512	Second round lost to (Poland) Magdalena Fręch
27	42	(Denmark) Clara Tauson	1,184	65	65	1,184	Third round lost to (Czech Republic) Linda Nosková [6]
28	29	(United States) Ann Li	1,596	10+163	65+30	1,518	Third round lost to (United States) Coco Gauff [4]
29	32	(Greece) Maria Sakkari	1,385	35	65	1,415	Third round lost to (Poland) Iga Świątek [7]
30	31	(Canada) Leylah Fernandez	1,454	10	10	1,454	Second round lost to (China) Wang Xiyu [Q]
31	34	(Croatia) Donna Vekić	1,336	10+60	10+2	1,278	Second round lost to (China) Wang Xinyu
32	37	(Indonesia) Janice Tjen	1,238	(10)^{∆}	65	1,293	Third round lost to Mirra Andreeva [5]
33	44	(Czech Republic) Kateřina Siniaková	1,170	(1)^{∆}	65	1,234	Third round lost to (United States) Madison Keys [20]

∆ The player is defending points from her 18th best result or her sixth best combined WTA 1000 tournament result.

=== Withdrawn seeded players ===
The following players would have been seeded, but withdrew before the tournament began.

Rank	Player	Points before	Points dropping	Points after	Withdrawal reason
7	(Czech Republic) Karolína Muchová	5,048	65	4,983	Minor surgery
15	(Italy) Jasmine Paolini	2,773	650	2,123	Left foot injury
17	(Canada) Victoria Mboko	2,530	0	2,530	Left knee injury
33	(United States) Hailey Baptiste	1,338	10+29	1,299	Left knee injury

== Other entry information ==
=== Wildcards ===
- (France) Loïs Boisson
- (United States) Caroline Dolehide
- (United States) Elvina Kalieva
- (United States) Sofia Kenin
- (United States) Sloane Stephens
- (Czech Republic) Darja Vidmanova
- (United States) Katie Volynets
- (United States) Venus Williams

=== Withdrawals ===
- § (United States) Hailey Baptiste → replaced by (Germany) Tatjana Maria
- α (France) Loïs Boisson → replaced by (Uzbekistan) Kamilla Rakhimova
- ‡ (Romania) Jaqueline Cristian → replaced by (Uzbekistan) Maria Timofeeva
- § (Canada) Victoria Mboko → replaced by (Germany) Tamara Korpatsch
- ‡ (Czech Republic) Karolína Muchová → replaced by (Switzerland) Simona Waltert
- † (Japan) Naomi Osaka → replaced by (Germany) Eva Lys (LL)
- ‡ (Italy) Jasmine Paolini → replaced by (United States) Taylor Townsend
- § (United Kingdom) Emma Raducanu → replaced by (Australia) Maya Joint

§ – not included on entry list
‡ – withdrew from entry list
α – withdrew from entry list (using special ranking) and received wildcard
† – withdrew from main draw

== Qualifying ==
=== Seeds ===
1. (Austria) Lilli Tagger (qualified)
2. (Mexico) Renata Zarazúa (first round)
3. (Thailand) Lanlana Tararudee (qualifying competition)
4. (Austria) Sinja Kraus (qualified)
5. (Germany) Eva Lys (qualifying competition, lucky loser)
6. (Argentina) Solana Sierra (first round)
7. Alina Korneeva (qualifying competition, withdrew)
8. (Belgium) Hanne Vandewinkel (qualified)
9. (China) Wang Xiyu (qualified)
10. (Colombia) Emiliana Arango (qualified)
11. Anastasia Zakharova (first round)
12. (Spain) Oksana Selekhmeteva (qualifying competition)
13. (France) Elsa Jacquemot (first round)
14. (Uzbekistan) Polina Kudermetova (qualifying competition)
15. (Slovenia) Veronika Erjavec (first round)
16. (Germany) Ella Seidel (first round)
17. (Australia) Taylah Preston (first round)
18. Anna Blinkova (qualified)
19. (Thailand) Mananchaya Sawangkaew (qualified)
20. (Japan) Moyuka Uchijima (first round)
21. (Austria) Julia Grabher (first round)
22. (Armenia) Alina Charaeva (qualified)
23. (United States) Claire Liu (qualifying competition)
24. (France) Léolia Jeanjean (qualifying competition)

=== Qualifiers ===
1. (Austria) Lilli Tagger
2. (United States) Kayla Day
3. (Thailand) Mananchaya Sawangkaew
4. (Austria) Sinja Kraus
5. Anna Blinkova
6. (United Kingdom) Harriet Dart
7. (Armenia) Alina Charaeva
8. (Belgium) Hanne Vandewinkel
9. (China) Wang Xiyu
10. (Colombia) Emiliana Arango
11. (Italy) Lucrezia Stefanini
12. (United States) Mary Stoiana

=== Lucky loser ===
1. (Germany) Eva Lys

=== Qualifying draw ===
==== First qualifier ====
First round
1	(Austria) Lilli Tagger	3	6	6
(China) Zhu Lin	6	1	1
WC	(United States) Robin Montgomery	4	7	6
21	(Austria) Julia Grabher	6	5	3

Qualifying competition
1	(Austria) Lilli Tagger	6	6
WC	(United States) Robin Montgomery	3	1

==== Second qualifier ====
First round
2	(Mexico) Renata Zarazúa	4	4
(China) Yuan Yue	6	6
(United States) Kayla Day	6	6
17	(Australia) Taylah Preston	3	2

Qualifying competition
(China) Yuan Yue	6	5	3
(United States) Kayla Day	2	7	6

==== Third qualifier ====
First round
3	(Thailand) Lanlana Tararudee	7	7
(Australia) Emerson Jones	5	5
(Andorra) Victoria Jiménez Kasintseva	3	3
19	(Thailand) Mananchaya Sawangkaew	6	6

Qualifying competition
3	(Thailand) Lanlana Tararudee	4	3
19	(Thailand) Mananchaya Sawangkaew	6	6

==== Fourth qualifier ====
First round
4	(Austria) Sinja Kraus	6	6
(Spain) Marina Bassols Ribera	4	3
Polina Iatcenko	4	2
23	(United States) Claire Liu	6	6

Qualifying competition
4	(Austria) Sinja Kraus	6	6
23	(United States) Claire Liu	4	3

==== Fifth qualifier ====
First round
5	(Germany) Eva Lys	5	6	6
(Poland) Katarzyna Kawa	7	1	4
(Czech Republic) Dominika Šalková	3	4
18	Anna Blinkova	6	6

Qualifying competition
5	(Germany) Eva Lys	6	2	2
18	Anna Blinkova	3	6	6

==== Sixth qualifier ====
First round
6	(Argentina) Solana Sierra	1	1
PR	(Japan) Aoi Ito	6	6
(United Kingdom) Harriet Dart	6	6
20	(Japan) Moyuka Uchijima	3	0

Qualifying competition
PR	(Japan) Aoi Ito	3	4
(United Kingdom) Harriet Dart	6	6

==== Seventh qualifier ====
First round
7	Alina Korneeva	6	6
WC	(United States) Varvara Lepchenko	3	1
PR	(Canada) Rebecca Marino	3	3
22	(Armenia) Alina Charaeva	6	6

Qualifying competition
7	Alina Korneeva
22	(Armenia) Alina Charaeva	w/o

==== Eighth qualifier ====
First round
8	(Belgium) Hanne Vandewinkel	7	6
WC	(United States) Akasha Urhobo	5	4
(Slovakia) Rebecca Šramková	7	6
13	(France) Elsa Jacquemot	5	3

Qualifying competition
8	(Belgium) Hanne Vandewinkel	6	3	6
(Slovakia) Rebecca Šramková	4	6	3

==== Ninth qualifier ====
First round
9	(China) Wang Xiyu	6	6
WC	(Canada) Bianca Andreescu	0	4
WC	(United States) Carol Young Suh Lee	4	7^{7}	4
14	(Uzbekistan) Polina Kudermetova	6	6^{5}	6

Qualifying competition
9	(China) Wang Xiyu	6	6
14	(Uzbekistan) Polina Kudermetova	3	2

==== Tenth qualifier ====
First round
10	(Colombia) Emiliana Arango	3	6	6
Aliaksandra Sasnovich	6	4	4
PR	(Argentina) Nadia Podoroska	6	6
16	(Germany) Ella Seidel	2	2

Qualifying competition
10	(Colombia) Emiliana Arango	4	7	6
PR	(Argentina) Nadia Podoroska	6	5	3

==== Eleventh qualifier ====
First round
11	Anastasia Zakharova	4	2
(Italy) Lucrezia Stefanini	6	6
(Japan) Himeno Sakatsume	6	3	2
24	(France) Léolia Jeanjean	3	6	6

Qualifying competition
(Italy) Lucrezia Stefanini	6	6
24	(France) Léolia Jeanjean	2	4

==== Twelfth qualifier ====
First round
12	(Spain) Oksana Selekhmeteva	6^{6}	6	6
WC	(United States) Elizabeth Mandlik	7^{8}	4	3
(United States) Mary Stoiana	6	7^{7}
15	(Slovenia) Veronika Erjavec	2	6^{3}

Qualifying competition
12	(Spain) Oksana Selekhmeteva	0	7	4
(United States) Mary Stoiana	6	5	6
