= 2025 Mumbai Open – Doubles =

Draw of a professional tennis tournament

Doubles
- 2025 Mumbai Open

Final
- Champions: Amina Anshba; Elena Pridankina
- Runners-up: (Netherlands) Arianne Hartono (India) Prarthana Thombare
- Score: 7–6^{(7–4)}, 2–6, [10–7]

Events
Singles	Doubles
← 2024 ·	Mumbai Open

Amina Anshba and Elena Pridankina won the title, defeating Arianne Hartono and Prarthana Thombare in the final, 7–6^{(7–4)}, 2–6, [10–7].

Dalila Jakupović and Sabrina Santamaria were the reigning champions, but Santamaria chose not to participate this year. Jakupović partnered Ankita Raina, but they lost in the first round to Nao Hibino and Oksana Kalashnikova.

== Seeds ==
1. (Japan) Nao Hibino / (Georgia (country)) Oksana Kalashnikova (quarterfinals)
2. Amina Anshba / Elena Pridankina (champions)
3. (United Kingdom) Eden Silva / Anastasia Tikhonova (semifinals)
4. (Italy) Nicole Fossa Huergo / (Italy) Camilla Rosatello (semifinals)

== Draw ==
=== Key ===
- Q = Qualifier
- WC = Wild card
- LL = Lucky loser
- Alt = Alternate
- SE = Special exempt
- PR = Protected ranking
- ITF = ITF entry
- JE = Junior exempt
- w/o = Walkover
- r = Retired
- d = Defaulted
- SR = Special ranking

=== Draw ===
First round
1	(Japan) N Hibino (Georgia (country)) O Kalashnikova	7^{7}	6
(Slovenia) D Jakupović (India) A Raina	6^{4}	2
(Thailand) P Plipuech (Japan) N Sato	2	3
(Netherlands) A Hartono (India) P Thombare	6	6
3	(United Kingdom) E Silva; A Tikhonova	6	6
M Kozyreva; I Shymanovich	2	3
(United Kingdom) M Lumsden (Switzerland) S Waltert
(United States) J Aney (United States) J Failla	w/o
WC	(India) S Bhamidipaty (India) R Bhatia	5	6	[10]
(Japan) M Hontama (Japan) K Okamura	7	2	[7]
(Canada) R Marino (United States) A Smith	2	4
4	(Italy) N Fossa Huergo (Italy) C Rosatello	6	6
(United Kingdom) A Barnett (India) R Bhosale	w/o
(Kazakhstan) Z Diyas; E Yashina
(Philippines) A Eala (Chinese Taipei) C-y Tsao	4	4
2	A Anshba; E Pridankina	6	6

Quarterfinals
1	(Japan) N Hibino (Georgia (country)) O Kalashnikova	1	3
(Netherlands) A Hartono (India) P Thombare	6	6
3	(United Kingdom) E Silva; A Tikhonova	7	7
(United States) J Aney (United States) J Failla	5	5
WC	(India) S Bhamidipaty (India) R Bhatia	3	3
4	(Italy) N Fossa Huergo (Italy) C Rosatello	6	6
(United Kingdom) A Barnett (India) R Bhosale	4	3
2	A Anshba; E Pridankina	6	6

Semifinals
(Netherlands) A Hartono (India) P Thombare	2	6	[10]
3	(United Kingdom) E Silva; A Tikhonova	6	4	[2]
4	(Italy) N Fossa Huergo (Italy) C Rosatello	6	3	[3]
2	A Anshba; E Pridankina	4	6	[10]

Final
(Netherlands) A Hartono (India) P Thombare	6^{4}	6	[7]
2	A Anshba; E Pridankina	7^{7}	2	[10]
