= 2026 Mumbai Open – Singles =

Singles
- 2026 Mumbai Open

Final
- Champion: (Thailand) Mananchaya Sawangkaew
- Runner-up: (Austria) Lilli Tagger
- Score: 6–4, 6–3

Events
Singles	Doubles
- Mumbai Open

Jil Teichmann was the defending champion, but did not participate this year.

Mananchaya Sawangkaew won the title, defeating Lilli Tagger in the final, 6–4, 6–3.

== Seeds ==
1. (New Zealand) Lulu Sun (withdrew)
2. (Latvia) Darja Semeņistaja (quarterfinals)
3. (France) Léolia Jeanjean (quarterfinals)
4. (Belgium) Hanne Vandewinkel (second round)
5. (Thailand) Lanlana Tararudee (semifinals)
6. (Uzbekistan) Polina Kudermetova (withdrew)
7. (Austria) Lilli Tagger (final)
8. Polina Iatcenko (first round)
9. Tatiana Prozorova (quarterfinals)

== Draw ==
Key

- Q = Qualifier
- WC = Wild card
- LL = Lucky loser
- Alt = Alternate
- ITF = ITF entry
- PR = Protected ranking
- SR = Special ranking
- SE = Special exempt
- JE = Junior exempt
- JR = Junior Accelerator Programme entrant
- CO = College Accelerator Programme entrant
- NG = Next Gen Accelerator Program entrant
- w/o = Walkover
- r = Retired
- d = Defaulted

=== Finals ===
Semifinals
(Thailand) Mananchaya Sawangkaew	6	3	6
5	(Thailand) Lanlana Tararudee	2	6	1
(China) Tian Fangran	2	6^{3}
7	(Austria) Lilli Tagger	6	7^{7}

Final
(Thailand) Mananchaya Sawangkaew	6	6
7	(Austria) Lilli Tagger	4	3

=== Top half ===
First round
LL	(India) A Raina	4	0
Q	(Japan) M Matsuda	6	6
(Thailand) M Sawangkaew	6	6
(Slovakia) V Morvayová	2	1
WC	(India) S Bhamidipaty	1	3
Q	K Sidorova	6	6
(Indonesia) P Nugroho	2	1
9	T Prozorova	6	6
3	(France) L Jeanjean	6	6
WC	(India) V Chaudhari	2	0
LL	(Argentina) N Fossa Huergo	4	3
(Japan) M Kuramochi	6	6
(United Kingdom) M Xu	1	0^{r}
(South Korea) S-h Park	6	0
WC	(India) M Rajeshwaran	3	2
5	(Thailand) L Tararudee	6	6

Second round
Q	(Japan) M Matsuda	4	1
(Thailand) M Sawangkaew	6	6
Q	K Sidorova	4	1
9	T Prozorova	6	6
3	(France) L Jeanjean	6	6
(Japan) M Kuramochi	3	3
(South Korea) S-h Park	6	3	0
5	(Thailand) L Tararudee	3	6	6

Quarterfinals
(Thailand) M Sawangkaew	6	6
9	T Prozorova	1	4
3	(France) L Jeanjean	6	3	2
5	(Thailand) L Tararudee	4	6	6

Semifinals
(Thailand) M Sawangkaew	6	3	6
5	(Thailand) L Tararudee	2	6	1

=== Bottom half ===
First round
8	P Iatcenko	7	3	3
(Japan) M Yamaguchi	5	6	6
LL	(Morocco) Y Kabbaj	6	6
Q	(Thailand) P Plipuech	3	3
(China) F Tian	6	6
(Japan) R Saigo	0	3
Q	(Poland) Z Pawlikowska	3	3
4	(Belgium) H Vandewinkel	6	6
7	(Austria) L Tagger	7	6
WC	(India) V Adkar	5	4
(India) S Yamalapalli	5	2
(Japan) E Shimizu	7	6
(Japan) M Hontama	6	6
A Ibragimova	1	4
(Italy) D Cherubini	3	1
2	(Latvia) D Semeņistaja	6	6

Second round
(Japan) M Yamaguchi	4	6	7^{7}
LL	(Morocco) Y Kabbaj	6	4	6^{5}
(China) F Tian	2	6	6
4	(Belgium) H Vandewinkel	6	4	4
7	(Austria) L Tagger	6	6
(Japan) E Shimizu	2	2
(Japan) M Hontama	4	6^{3}
2	(Latvia) D Semeņistaja	6	7^{7}

Quarterfinals
(Japan) M Yamaguchi	2	6	2
(China) F Tian	6	2	6
7	(Austria) L Tagger	4	6	6
2	(Latvia) D Semeņistaja	6	4	2

Semifinals
(China) F Tian	2	6^{3}
7	(Austria) L Tagger	6	7^{7}

== Qualifying ==
=== Seeds ===
1. (Argentina) Nicole Fossa Huergo (qualifying competition, lucky loser)
2. (Morocco) Yasmine Kabbaj (qualifying competition, lucky loser)
3. (Poland) Zuzanna Pawlikowska (qualified)
4. (France) Yara Bartashevich (first round)
5. (Japan) Misaki Matsuda (qualified)
6. Kristiana Sidorova (qualified)
7. (Finland) Anastasia Kulikova (qualifying competition)
8. (India) Ankita Raina (qualifying competition, lucky loser)

=== Qualifiers ===
1. (Japan) Misaki Matsuda
2. Kristiana Sidorova
3. (Poland) Zuzanna Pawlikowska
4. (Thailand) Peangtarn Plipuech

=== Lucky losers ===
1. (Argentina) Nicole Fossa Huergo
2. (Morocco) Yasmine Kabbaj
3. (India) Ankita Raina

=== Qualifying draw ===
==== First qualifier ====
First round
1	(Argentina) Nicole Fossa Huergo	6	6
(Japan) Hiroko Kuwata	2	1
(India) Saumya Vig	0	1
5	(Japan) Misaki Matsuda	6	6

Qualifying competition
1	(Argentina) Nicole Fossa Huergo	5	4
5	(Japan) Misaki Matsuda	7	6

==== Second qualifier ====
First round
2	(Morocco) Yasmine Kabbaj	6	6
(India) Sonal Patil	0	2
(India) Zeel Desai	2	0
6	Kristiana Sidorova	6	6

Qualifying competition
2	(Morocco) Yasmine Kabbaj	4	2
6	Kristiana Sidorova	6	6

==== Third qualifier ====
First round
3	(Poland) Zuzanna Pawlikowska	6^{1}	6	6
WC	(India) Parthsarthi Arun Mundhe	7^{7}	2	3
(Japan) Naoko Eto	0	0
7	(Finland) Anastasia Kulikova	6	6

Qualifying competition
3	(Poland) Zuzanna Pawlikowska	6	4	7^{7}
7	(Finland) Anastasia Kulikova	3	6	6^{4}

==== Fourth qualifier ====
First round
4	(France) Yara Bartashevich	2	6	2
(Thailand) Peangtarn Plipuech	6	3	6
WC	(India) Akanksha Nitture	2	1
8	(India) Ankita Raina	6	6

Qualifying competition
(Thailand) Peangtarn Plipuech	6	1	6
8	(India) Ankita Raina	2	6	4
