= Lilli Tagger =

Austrian tennis player (born 2008)

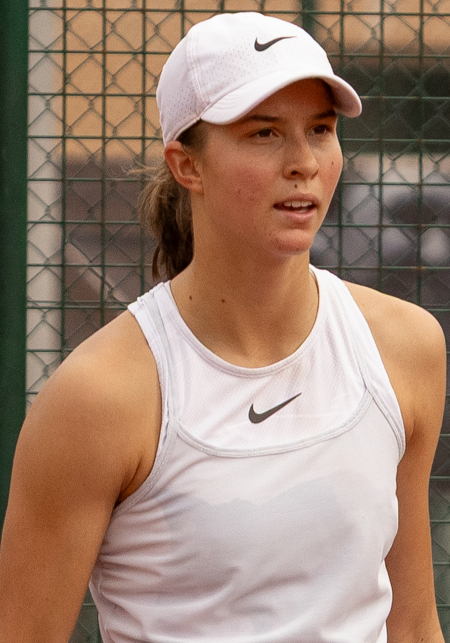
- Tagger in 2025
- Country (sports): Austria
- Residence: Varese, Italy
- Born: 17 February 2008 (age 18) Lienz, Austria
- Height: 1.86 m (6 ft 1 in)
- Plays: Right (one-handed backhand)
- Coach: Francesca Schiavone
- Prize money: $879,088

Singles
- Career record: 96–52
- Career titles: 1
- Highest ranking: No. 45 (27 July 2026)
- Current ranking: No. 53 (2 November 2026)

Grand Slam singles results
- Australian Open: Q3 (2026)
- French Open: 1R (2026)
- Wimbledon: 1R (2026)
- US Open: 2R (2026)

Doubles
- Career record: 13–8
- Career titles: 0
- Highest ranking: No. 198 (2 November 2026)
- Current ranking: No. 198 (2 November 2026)

Grand Slam doubles results
- French Open: 2R (2026)
- Wimbledon: 1R (2026)
- US Open: 2R (2026)
- Last updated on: 2 November 2026.

Lilli Tagger (born 17 February 2008) is an Austrian tennis player. She has a career-high singles ranking by the WTA of No. 45, achieved on 27 July 2026. On 2 November 2026, she peaked at No. 198 of the WTA doubles rankings.

Tagger has won one WTA Tour title, at the 2026 Prague Open. She was also the girls' singles champion at the 2025 French Open.

== Career ==
=== Juniors ===
From Lienz, Tagger moved to Varese near Milan, in Italy, and trained at the academy of Francesca Schiavone.

In July 2024, the Austrian qualified for the girls' singles at Wimbledon with a win over Ksenia Efremova in a 10–6 match tiebreak.

Tagger beat British Mimi Xu to reach the quarterfinals of the girls' singles at the 2025 Australian Open, where she lost to Australian Emerson Jones.

At the 2025 French Open, Tagger had Francesca Schiavone as part of her support team. She reached the semifinals of the girls' singles with a win over the No. 12 seed Julia Stusek. In doing so, she became the first female Austrian player to reach the semifinals of a junior Grand Slam tournament since Tamira Paszek in 2006, and the first Austrian overall since Dominic Thiem in 2011. Tagger again faced Emerson Jones and won in straight sets, before also defeating Hannah Klugman of Great Britain in straight sets, for the loss of only two games in the final. In the girls' doubles, she played alongside Slovak Mia Pohánková and they reached the semifinals, before facing German pairing Sonja Zhenikhova and Eva Bennemann.

=== 2023–2024: Pro beginnings ===
In November 2023, Tagger reached her first ITF Women's Circuit final in Sharm El Sheikh. She won her first ITF World Tour doubles title in Viserba, Italy in July 2024 playing alongside Italian Anastasia Bertacchi, they defeated Francesca Pace and Inès Ibbou in the final.

In December 2024, she competed in a WTA 125 main draw for the first time in Limoges as a wildcard entrant. She won her first-round match against the world No. 159, Victoria Jiménez Kasintseva, before losing her next match to sixth seed Nuria Parrizas-Diaz.

=== 2025: WTA Tour and top 200 debuts, first final ===
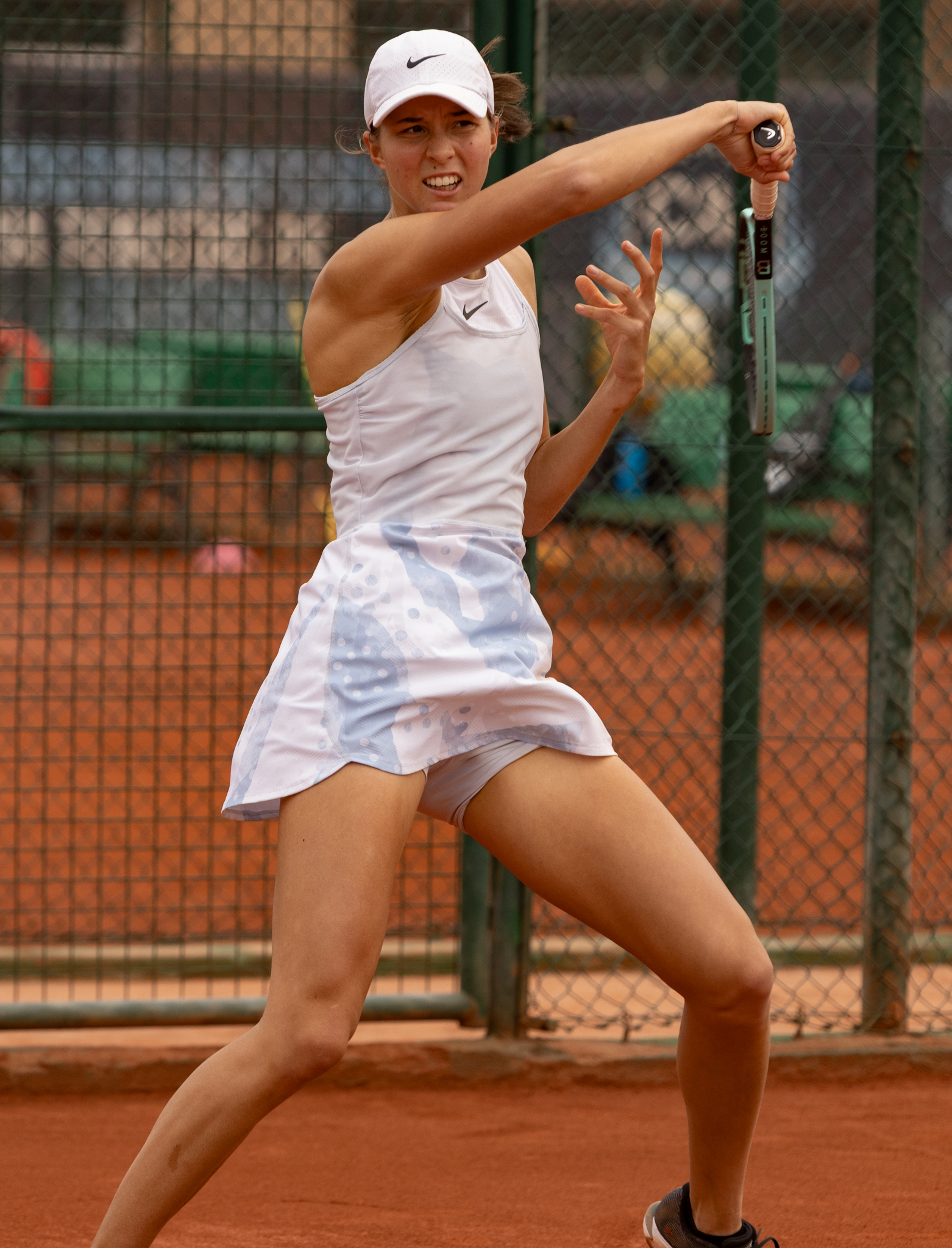
Tagger in March 2025

In March, Tagger won her first ITF Circuit singles title defeating Lois Boisson in a straight-sets final in Terrassa, Spain.

In October, Tagger was given a wildcard entry to make her WTA Tour debut at the Jiangxi Open, recording wins over fellow tour debutante Zhu Chenting, Elisabetta Cocciaretto and Tamara Korpatsch to make it through to the semifinals, where she fought back from three match points down to overcome second seed and defending champion, Viktorija Golubic, in three sets to become the first player born in 2008 to reach a WTA Tour final. In the championship match, she lost to Anna Blinkova in straight sets. Despite her defeat, she reached a new career-high ranking in the top 200, at world No. 156, on 3 November 2025.

=== 2026: Maiden WTA Tour title, top 50 ===
In February, Tagger reached her first WTA 125 final at the Mumbai Open, losing to Mananchaya Sawangkaew in straight sets. The following month she received a wildcard entry to make her WTA 1000 tournament main-draw debut at the Indian Wells Open, where she defeated Varvara Gracheva, before losing to world No. 34, Maria Sakkari, in the second round. Given a wildcard entry to make her debut at the Miami Open, Tagger defeated qualifier Ella Seidel to make it into the second round, at which point she lost to 11th seed Ekaterina Alexandrova.

At her home tournament, the Upper Austria Linz Open, she was given a wildcard entry and defeated fellow wildcard entrant Paula Badosa and world No. 21, Liudmila Samsonova, to reach her second WTA Tour quarterfinal, the first on clay and at the WTA 500-level. Tagger lost to Anastasia Potapova in the last eight. As a result of her run, she reached world No. 97 in the WTA singles rankings on 13 April 2026, making her the sixth teenager and the youngest player in the top 100.

In May, Tagger made her French Open main-draw debut, but lost in the first round to 32nd seed Wang Xinyu in three sets. Two months later at the Prague Open, she defeated second seed Barbora Krejčíková in the semifinals and eighth seed Daria Snigur in the final to win her first WTA Tour title. This success propelled Tagger into the WTA singles top 50 for the first time at world No. 45 on 27 July 2026.

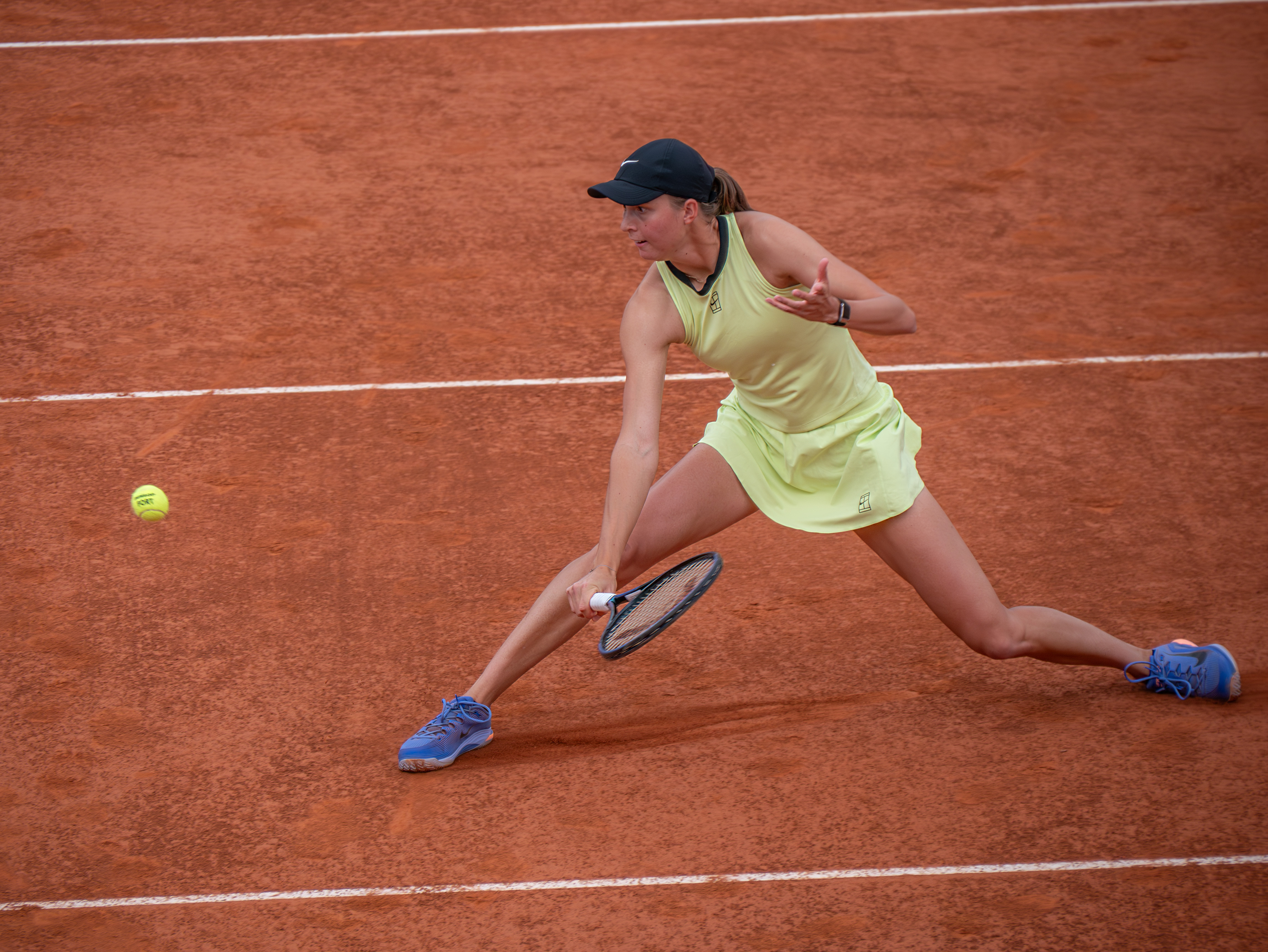
Tagger at the 2026 Italian Open

She recorded her maiden major match win at the US Open, defeating Tamara Korpatsch, before losing to 10th seed Amanda Anisimova in the second round. In October, Tagger overcame fifth seed Liudmila Samsonova en route to the quarterfinals at the Japan Open, where her run was ended by top seed Ann Li. The next week at the Guangzhou Open, she was seeded fourth and made it through to her third WTA Tour final, but lost to qualifier Harriet Dart in three sets.

== Performance timeline ==
Key
W	F	SF	QF	#R	RR	Q#	DNQ	A	NH

(W) winner; (F) finalist; (SF) semifinalist; (QF) quarterfinalist; (#R) rounds 4, 3, 2, 1; (RR) round-robin stage; (Q#) qualification round; (DNQ) did not qualify; (A) absent; (NH) not held; (SR) strike rate (events won / competed); (W–L) win–loss record.
To avoid confusion and double counting, these charts are updated at the conclusion of a tournament or when the player's participation has ended.

Only main-draw results in WTA Tour, Grand Slam tournaments, Billie Jean King Cup, United Cup, Hopman Cup and Olympic Games are included in win–loss records.

=== Singles ===
Current through the 2026 Wuhan Open.

Tournament	2025	2026	SR	W–L	Win %
Grand Slam tournaments
Australian Open	A	Q3	0 / 0	0–0	–
French Open	A	1R	0 / 1	0–1	0%
Wimbledon	A	1R	0 / 1	0–1	0%
US Open	A	2R	0 / 1	1–1	50%
Win–Loss	0–0	1–3	0 / 3	1–3	25%
WTA 1000 tournaments
Qatar Open	A	A	0 / 0	0–0	–
Dubai Championships	A	A	0 / 0	0–0	–
Indian Wells Open	A	2R	0 / 1	1–1	50%
Miami Open	Q1	2R	0 / 1	1–1	50%
Madrid Open	A	A	0 / 0	0–0	–
Italian Open	A	1R	0 / 1	0–1	0%
Canadian Open	A	A	0 / 0	0–0	–
Cincinnati Open	A	1R	0 / 1	0–1	0%
China Open	A	1R	0 / 1	0–1	0%
Wuhan Open	A	1R	0 / 1	0–1	0%
Win–Loss	0–0	2–6	0 / 6	2–6	25%
Career statistics
	2025	2026	SR	W–L	Win %
Tournaments	1	9	Career total: 10		
Titles	0	1	Career total: 1		
Finals	1	1	Career total: 2		
Hard win–loss	4–1	10–8	1 / 5	12–4	59%
Clay win–loss	0–0	1–3	0 / 4	2–4	40%
Grass win–loss	0–0	2–3	0 / 1	0–1	–
Overall win–loss	4–1	13–14	1 / 10	14–9	56%
Win %	69%	43%	Career total: 56%		
Year-end ranking	153				

=== Doubles ===
Current through the 2026 Wimbledon Championships.

Tournament	2025	2026	SR	W–L
Grand Slam tournaments
Australian Open	A	A	0 / 0	0–0
French Open	A	2R	0 / 1	1–1
Wimbledon	A	1R	0 / 1	0–1
US Open	A		0 / 0	0–0
Win–Loss	0–0	1–2	0 / 2	1–2
WTA 1000 tournaments
Qatar Open	A	A	0 / 0	0–0
Dubai Championships	A	A	0 / 0	0–0
Indian Wells Open	A	A	0 / 0	0–0
Miami Open	A	A	0 / 0	0–0
Madrid Open	A	A	0 / 0	0–0
Italian Open	A	A	0 / 0	0–0
Canadian Open	A		0 / 0	0–0
Cincinnati Open	A		0 / 0	0–0
China Open	A		0 / 0	0–0
Wuhan Open	A		0 / 0	0–0
Win–Loss	0–0	0–0	0 / 0	0–0

== WTA Tour finals ==
=== Singles: 3 (1 title, 2 runner-ups) ===
Legend WTA 250 (1–2)	Finals by surface Hard (1–2)	Finals by setting Outdoor (1–2)

Result	W–L	Date	Tournament	Tier	Surface	Opponent	Score
Loss	0–1	Nov 2025	Jiangxi Open, China	WTA 250	Hard	Anna Blinkova	3–6, 3–6
Win	1–1	Jul 2026	Prague Open, Czech Republic	WTA 250	Hard	(Ukraine) Daria Snigur	7–6^{(7–3)}, 6–2
Loss	1–2	Oct 2026	Guangzhou Open, China	WTA 250	Hard	(United Kingdom) Harriet Dart	6–4, 3–6, 4–6

== WTA 125 finals ==
=== Singles: 1 (runner-up) ===
Result	Date	Tournament	Surface	Opponents	Score
Loss	Feb 2026	Mumbai Open, India	Hard	(Thailand) Mananchaya Sawangkaew	4–6, 3–6

== ITF Circuit finals ==
=== Singles: 5 (4 titles, 1 runner-up) ===
Legend W100 tournaments (1–0) W75 tournaments (2–1) W35 tournaments (1–0)	Finals by surface Clay (3–1) Hard (1–0)

Result	W–L	Date	Tournament	Tier	Surface	Opponent	Score
Win	1–0	Mar 2025	ITF Terrassa, Spain	W35	Clay	(France) Loïs Boisson	7–6^{(7–4)}, 6–3
Loss	1–1	Aug 2025	Ladies Open Amstetten, Austria	W75	Clay	(Austria) Sinja Kraus	2–6, 4–6
Win	2–1	Sep 2025	ITF Bucharest, Romania	W75	Clay	(North Macedonia) Lina Gjorcheska	6–4, 3–6, 6–4
Win	3–1	Sep 2025	ITF Kuršumlijska Banja, Serbia	W75	Clay	Rada Zolotareva	5–7, 6–2, 6–2
Win	4–1	Jan 2026	ITF Fujairah Championships, UAE	W100	Hard	(United Kingdom) Harriet Dart	6–4, 6–2

=== Doubles: 2 (1 title, 1 runner-up) ===
Legend W15 tournaments (1–1)	Finals by surface Clay (1–0) Hard (0–1)

Result	W–L	Date	Tournament	Tier	Surface	Partner	Opponents	Score
Loss	0–1	Nov 2023	ITF Sharm El Sheikh, Egypt	W15	Hard	(Egypt) Mariam Atia	Evgeniya Burdina; Nina Rudiukova	7–5, 4–6, [6–10]
Win	1–1	Jul 2024	ITF Viserba, Italy	W15	Clay	(Italy) Anastasia Bertacchi	(Algeria) Inès Ibbou (Italy) Francesca Pace	6–0, 2–6, [10–5]

== WTA Tour career earnings ==
Current as of 27 July 2026.

- Grand Slam titles, WTA titles, Total titles – includes singles, doubles and mixed doubles

Year	Grand Slam titles	WTA titles	Total titles	Earnings ($)	Money list rank
2022	0	0	0	210	2,616
2023	0	0	0	578	2,009
2024	0	0	0	2,431	1,370
2025	0	0	0	65,928	338
2026	0	1	1	487,373	105
Career	0	1	1	560,255	808

== Junior Grand Slam tournament finals ==
=== Singles: 1 (title) ===
Result	Year	Tournament	Surface	Opponent	Score
Win	2025	French Open	Clay	(United Kingdom) Hannah Klugman	6–2, 6–0
