= 2025 French Open =

2025 tennis tournament held in Paris, France

- Date: 25 May – 8 June 2025
- Edition: 124th
- Category: Grand Slam
- Prize money: €56,352,000
- Surface: Clay
- Location: Paris (XVI^{e}), France
- Venue: Roland Garros Stadium

Champions

Men's singles
- (Spain) Carlos Alcaraz

Women's singles
- (United States) Coco Gauff

Men's doubles
- (Spain) Marcel Granollers / (Argentina) Horacio Zeballos

Women's doubles
- (Italy) Sara Errani / (Italy) Jasmine Paolini

Mixed doubles
- (Italy) Sara Errani / (Italy) Andrea Vavassori

Wheelchair men's singles
- (Japan) Tokito Oda

Wheelchair women's singles
- (Japan) Yui Kamiji

Wheelchair quad singles
- (Israel) Guy Sasson

Wheelchair men's doubles
- (United Kingdom) Alfie Hewett / (United Kingdom) Gordon Reid

Wheelchair women's doubles
- (Japan) Yui Kamiji / (South Africa) Kgothatso Montjane

Wheelchair quad doubles
- (Israel) Guy Sasson / (Netherlands) Niels Vink

Boys' singles
- (Germany) Niels McDonald

Girls' singles
- (Austria) Lilli Tagger

Boys' doubles
- (Finland) Oskari Paldanius / (Poland) Alan Ważny

Girls' doubles
- (Germany) Eva Bennemann / (Germany) Sonja Zhenikhova

Wheelchair boys' singles
- (Austria) Maximilian Taucher

Wheelchair girls' singles
- (Brazil) Vitória Miranda

Wheelchair boys' doubles
- (United States) Charlie Cooper / (Austria) Maximilian Taucher

Wheelchair girls' doubles
- (Belgium) Luna Gryp / (Brazil) Vitória Miranda
- French Open

The 2025 French Open was a Grand Slam tennis tournament that was played on outdoor clay courts and held at the Stade Roland Garros in Paris, France, from 25 May to 8 June 2025, comprising singles, doubles, mixed doubles play, junior and wheelchair tournaments.

Carlos Alcaraz defended his title in men's singles by defeating world No. 1 Jannik Sinner in the final, which lasted five hours and twenty nine minutes, the longest final in the tournament's history. It was his second French Open title and fifth major. Coco Gauff defeated the world No. 1 Aryna Sabalenka in the women's singles to win her first French Open and second major title. Iga Świątek was the three-time defending champion but lost to Sabalenka in the semifinals.

It was the 124th edition of the French Open and the second major tournament of 2025. The main singles draws included 16 qualifiers for men and 16 for women out of 128 players in each draw.

== Tournament ==
The 2025 French Open was the 124th edition of the French Open and was held at the Stade Roland Garros in Paris.

It was the first major since the 2013 US Open in which the world's top two players contested the final of both the women's and men's singles events, and the first at the French Open since 1984.

== Special events ==
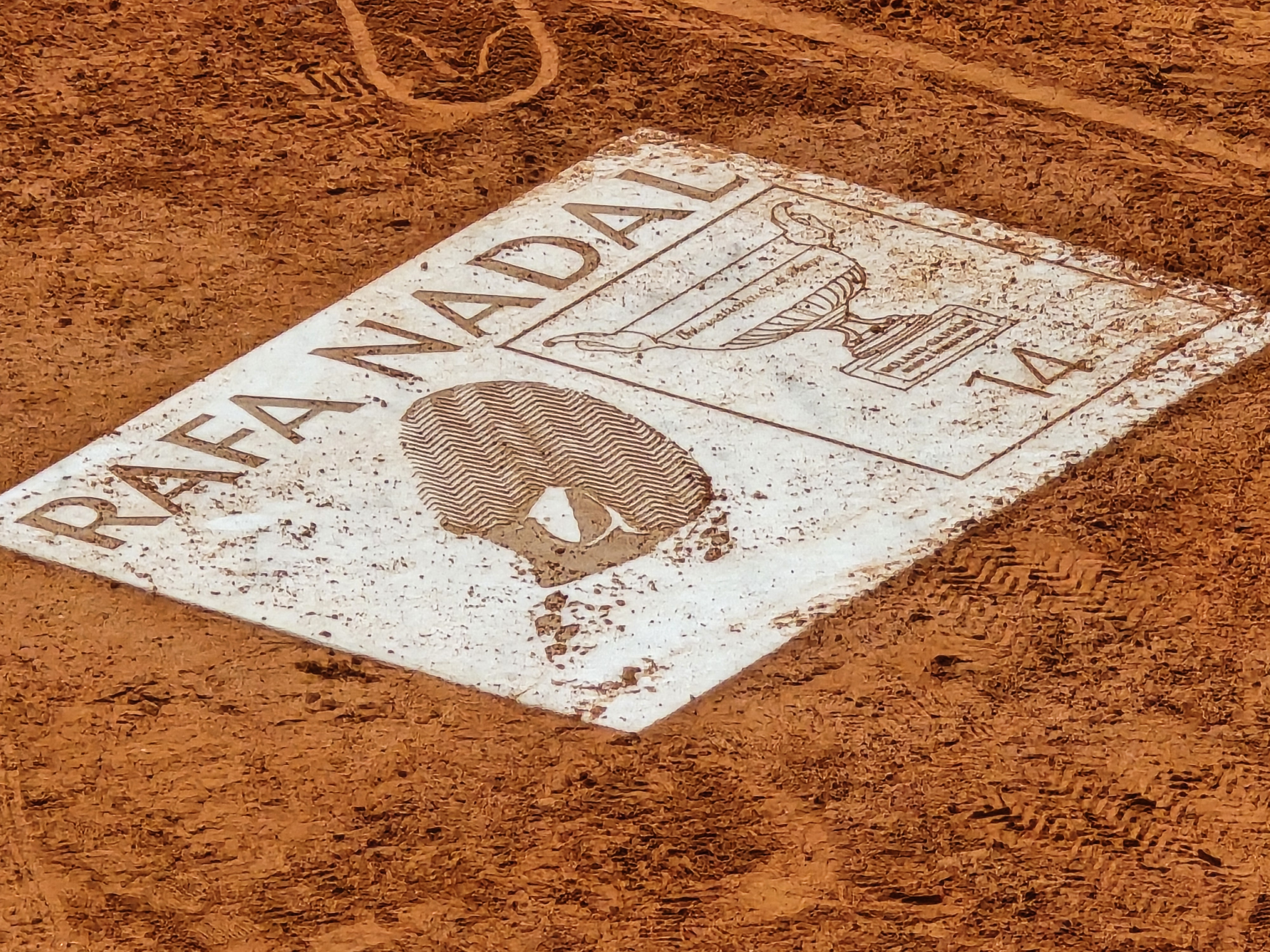
Commemorative plaque to Rafael Nadal unveiled during a tribute at Roland Garros in 2025

At the start of the clay-court tournament, the organizers paid tribute to former Spanish tennis player Rafael Nadal for being the tournament's most successful player and for also winning his first of 14 singles trophies in 2005, 20 years before.

After his loss against Jannik Sinner at the second round of the singles competition, Richard Gasquet ended his career as a professional tennis player and was honoured by the French Open's organisers with a commemorative trophy.

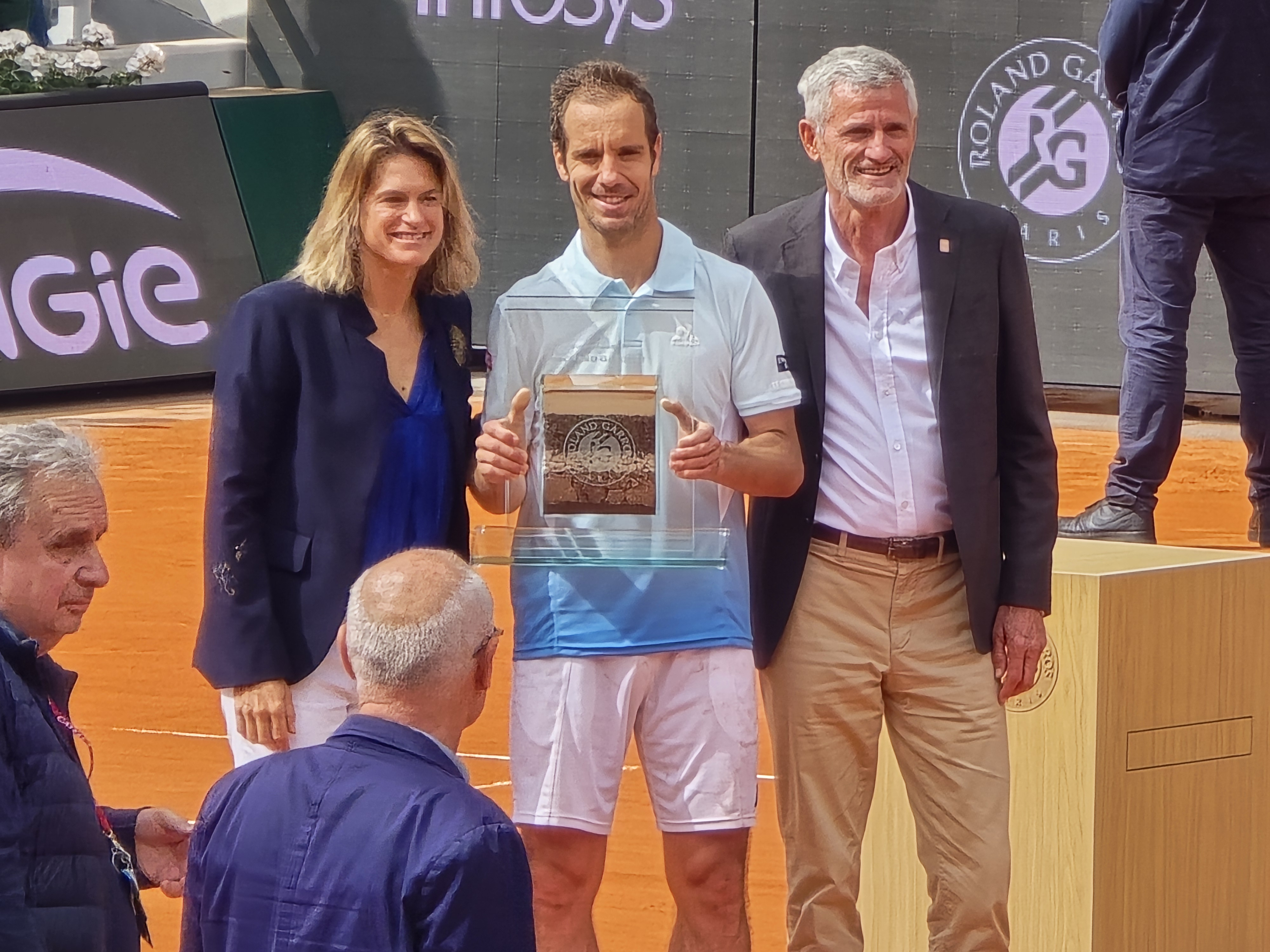
Richard Gasquet receiving a commemorative trophy during a ceremony in honour of his career at the 2025 French Open

== Singles players ==
- Men's singles

Men's singles players
Champion		Runner-up	
(Spain) Carlos Alcaraz [2]		(Italy) Jannik Sinner [1]	
Semifinals out
(Serbia) Novak Djokovic [6]		(Italy) Lorenzo Musetti [8]	
Quarterfinals out
(Kazakhstan) Alexander Bublik	(Germany) Alexander Zverev [3]	(United States) Frances Tiafoe [15]	(United States) Tommy Paul [12]
4th round out
Andrey Rublev [17]	(United Kingdom) Jack Draper [5]	(Netherlands) Tallon Griekspoor	(United Kingdom) Cameron Norrie
(Denmark) Holger Rune [10]	(Germany) Daniel Altmaier	(Australia) Alexei Popyrin [25]	(United States) Ben Shelton [13]
3rd round out
(Czech Republic) Jiří Lehečka	(France) Arthur Fils [14]	(Portugal) Henrique Rocha (Q)	(Brazil) João Fonseca
(Italy) Flavio Cobolli	(United States) Ethan Quinn (Q)	(United Kingdom) Jacob Fearnley	(Austria) Filip Misolic (Q)
(Argentina) Mariano Navone	(France) Quentin Halys	(United States) Sebastian Korda [23]	(Serbia) Hamad Medjedovic
(Portugal) Nuno Borges	Karen Khachanov [24]	(Italy) Matteo Gigante (Q)	(Bosnia and Herzegovina) Damir Džumhur
2nd round out
(France) Richard Gasquet (WC)	(Spain) Alejandro Davidovich Fokina [26]	(Australia) Adam Walton	(Spain) Jaume Munar
(Australia) Alex de Minaur [9]	(Czech Republic) Jakub Menšík [19]	(France) Pierre-Hugues Herbert (WC)	(France) Gaël Monfils
(Netherlands) Jesper de Jong	(Italy) Matteo Arnaldi	(Canada) Gabriel Diallo	(Kazakhstan) Alexander Shevchenko (LL)
(Argentina) Federico Agustín Gómez (LL)	(France) Ugo Humbert [22]	(Canada) Denis Shapovalov [27]	(France) Corentin Moutet
(Colombia) Daniel Elahi Galán (LL)	(United States) Reilly Opelka (PR)	(Serbia) Miomir Kecmanović	(United States) Emilio Nava (WC)
(Spain) Pablo Carreño Busta	(United States) Jenson Brooksby (PR)	(Argentina) Juan Manuel Cerúndolo (Q)	(Czech Republic) Vít Kopřiva
(Norway) Casper Ruud [7]	(Chile) Alejandro Tabilo	(Austria) Sebastian Ofner (PR)	(Hungary) Márton Fucsovics
(France) Hugo Gaston	(Greece) Stefanos Tsitsipas [20]	(France) Giovanni Mpetshi Perricard [31]	(Hungary) Fábián Marozsán
1st round out
(France) Arthur Rinderknech	(France) Térence Atmane (WC)	(Australia) Jordan Thompson	(Spain) Pablo Llamas Ruiz (Q)
(South Africa) Lloyd Harris (Q)	(Germany) Maximilian Marterer (Q)	(Argentina) Camilo Ugo Carabelli	(Chile) Nicolás Jarry
(Serbia) Laslo Djere	(Australia) James Duckworth	(Georgia (country)) Nikoloz Basilashvili (Q)	(France) Alexandre Müller
(Poland) Hubert Hurkacz [30]	(France) Benjamin Bonzi	(Bolivia) Hugo Dellien	(Italy) Mattia Bellucci
(United States) Learner Tien	(Italy) Francesco Passaro	(Croatia) Marin Čilić (LL)	(Canada) Félix Auger-Aliassime [29]
(Argentina) Francisco Cerúndolo [18]	(United States) Marcos Giron	(Serbia) Dušan Lajović	(Bulgaria) Grigor Dimitrov [16]
Daniil Medvedev [11]	(United States) Aleksandar Kovacevic	(Switzerland) Stan Wawrinka (WC)	(Australia) Christopher O'Connell
(Spain) Pedro Martínez	(China) Bu Yunchaokete	(France) Clément Tabur (Q)	(United States) Mackenzie McDonald
(Germany) Yannick Hanfmann (Q)	(France) Valentin Royer (WC)	(Australia) Rinky Hijikata	(United States) Brandon Nakashima [28]
(Czech Republic) Tomáš Macháč [21]	(Argentina) Sebastián Báez	(Netherlands) Botic van de Zandschulp	(Spain) Roberto Bautista Agut
Roman Safiullin	(Argentina) Francisco Comesaña	(Portugal) Jaime Faria	(Italy) Luciano Darderi
(United States) Alex Michelsen [32]	(Poland) Kamil Majchrzak	(Brazil) Thiago Monteiro	(United States) Taylor Fritz [4]
(Spain) Albert Ramos Viñolas (Q)	(France) Kyrian Jacquet (Q)	(France) Arthur Cazaux (WC)	(Japan) Yoshihito Nishioka
(Australia) Aleksandar Vukic	(Germany) Jan-Lennard Struff	(Australia) Tristan Schoolkate (WC)	(Denmark) Elmer Møller (LL)
(Italy) Lorenzo Sonego	(France) Ugo Blanchet (Q)	(Lebanon) Benjamin Hassan (Q)	(Argentina) Tomás Martín Etcheverry
(Belgium) Zizou Bergs	(Argentina) Thiago Agustín Tirante (LL)	(Italy) Luca Nardi	(Italy) Giulio Zeppieri (Q)

- Women's singles

Women's singles players
Champion		Runner-up	
(United States) Coco Gauff [2]		Aryna Sabalenka [1]	
Semifinals out
(Poland) Iga Świątek [5]		(France) Loïs Boisson (WC)	
Quarterfinals out
(China) Zheng Qinwen [8]	(Ukraine) Elina Svitolina [13]	Mirra Andreeva [6]	(United States) Madison Keys [7]
4th round out
(United States) Amanda Anisimova [16]	Liudmila Samsonova [19]	(Italy) Jasmine Paolini [4]	(Kazakhstan) Elena Rybakina [12]
(Australia) Daria Kasatkina [17]	(United States) Jessica Pegula [3]	(United States) Hailey Baptiste	Ekaterina Alexandrova [20]
3rd round out
(Serbia) Olga Danilović	(Denmark) Clara Tauson [22]	(Ukraine) Dayana Yastremska	(Canada) Victoria Mboko (Q)
(Ukraine) Yuliia Starodubtseva (LL)	(United States) Bernarda Pera	(Latvia) Jeļena Ostapenko [21]	(Romania) Jaqueline Cristian
(Kazakhstan) Yulia Putintseva [32]	(Spain) Paula Badosa [10]	(France) Elsa Jacquemot (WC)	(Czech Republic) Markéta Vondroušová
(United States) Sofia Kenin [31]	(Spain) Jéssica Bouzas Maneiro	Veronika Kudermetova	(Czech Republic) Marie Bouzková
2nd round out
(Switzerland) Jil Teichmann	(United States) Danielle Collins	(Netherlands) Arantxa Rus	(Switzerland) Viktorija Golubic
Diana Shnaider [11]	(Spain) Leyre Romero Gormaz (Q)	(Germany) Eva Lys	(Colombia) Emiliana Arango
(Australia) Ajla Tomljanović	Anastasia Potapova	(Croatia) Donna Vekić [18]	(Hungary) Anna Bondár
(United States) Iva Jovic (WC)	(United States) Caroline Dolehide	(Czech Republic) Sára Bejlek (Q)	(United Kingdom) Emma Raducanu
(United States) Ashlyn Krueger	(Chinese Taipei) Joanna Garland (Q)	(France) Léolia Jeanjean (WC)	(Romania) Elena-Gabriela Ruse
(United States) Alycia Parks	(Ukraine) Anhelina Kalinina	(Poland) Magdalena Fręch [25]	(United States) Ann Li
(United Kingdom) Katie Boulter	Victoria Azarenka	(Japan) Nao Hibino (Q)	(United States) Robin Montgomery
(Czech Republic) Barbora Krejčíková [15]	(Italy) Elisabetta Cocciaretto	(United Kingdom) Sonay Kartal	(Czech Republic) Tereza Valentová (Q)
1st round out
Kamilla Rakhimova	(Italy) Lucrezia Stefanini (Q)	(United Kingdom) Jodie Burrage (PR)	(Canada) Leylah Fernandez [27]
(Poland) Magda Linette	(Colombia) Camila Osorio	(Czech Republic) Petra Kvitová (PR)	(Serbia) Nina Stojanović (Q)
(Ukraine) Anastasiia Sobolieva (Q)	(Australia) Destanee Aiava (WC)	(France) Tiantsoa Rakotomanga Rajaonah (WC)	(Egypt) Mayar Sherif
(United States) Peyton Stearns [28]	(New Zealand) Lulu Sun	(Philippines) Alexandra Eala	Anastasia Pavlyuchenkova
(China) Yuan Yue	(Australia) Maya Joint	(Germany) Tamara Korpatsch (Q)	(Czech Republic) Linda Nosková [29]
Anna Blinkova	(France) Caroline Garcia	(Germany) Laura Siegemund	(Turkey) Zeynep Sönmez
(Argentina) Julia Riera (Q)	(Mexico) Renata Zarazúa	(Belgium) Greet Minnen	Polina Kudermetova
(Ukraine) Marta Kostyuk [26]	(Australia) Kimberly Birrell	(China) Wang Xinyu	(Slovakia) Rebecca Šramková
(Spain) Cristina Bucșa	(Netherlands) Suzan Lamens	(United States) Katie Volynets	(Argentina) Solana Sierra (Q)
(Czech Republic) Kateřina Siniaková	(Romania) Irina-Camelia Begu	(United States) McCartney Kessler	(Japan) Naomi Osaka
(Czech Republic) Karolína Muchová [14]	(Greece) Maria Sakkari	(Armenia) Elina Avanesyan	(Belgium) Elise Mertens [24]
(Tunisia) Ons Jabeur	Oksana Selekhmeteva (Q)	(Argentina) María Lourdes Carlé (Q)	(Romania) Anca Todoni
(Australia) Daria Saville (Q)	(France) Carole Monnet (Q)	(Belgium) Yanina Wickmayer (PR)	(France) Varvara Gracheva
(Brazil) Beatriz Haddad Maia [23]	(Japan) Moyuka Uchijima	(France) Diane Parry (WC)	(United States) Emma Navarro [9]
(Germany) Tatjana Maria	(Bulgaria) Viktoriya Tomova	(United States) Taylor Townsend (LL)	(Italy) Lucia Bronzetti
Anna Kalinskaya [30]	Erika Andreeva	(France) Chloé Paquet (WC)	(Australia) Olivia Gadecki

== Events ==
=== Men's singles ===
- (Spain) Carlos Alcaraz defeated (Italy) Jannik Sinner, 4–6, 6–7^{(4–7)}, 6–4, 7–6^{(7–3)}, 7–6^{(10–2)}

Defending champion Carlos Alcaraz defeated Jannik Sinner in the final, 4–6, 6–7^{(4–7)}, 6–4, 7–6^{(7–3)}, 7–6^{(10–2)} to win the men's singles tennis title. It was his second French Open title and fifth major title overall. Alcaraz came back from two sets down and saved three consecutive championship points en route to the title, becoming the third man in the Open Era to win a major after being championship points down in the final, following Gastón Gaudio at the 2004 French Open and Novak Djokovic at the 2019 Wimbledon Championships. Both players served for the championship (Sinner at 5–4 in the fourth set, Alcaraz at 5–4 in the fifth set), but both were broken.

At 5 hours and 29 minutes, it was the longest French Open final in history (surpassing the 1982 final), and the second-longest major final overall, after the 2012 Australian Open final. Alcaraz was the second man in the Open Era (after Roger Federer) to win his first five major finals and the second-youngest to win a fifth major, behind only Björn Borg (at 22 years and 5 days) and tied with Rafael Nadal (at exact same age of 22 years, 1 month and 3 days). It was the first French Open singles final to be decided in a fifth-set tiebreak (after the tiebreak rule was added in 2022), and the first men's final at any major to be contested by two players born in the 2000s. It was also the first time in grand slam history that a 10 points super tiebreaker decided a singles final since all 4 grand slams agreed to replace the advantage set format in the final set by a 10 points super tiebreaker in 2022.

=== Women's singles ===
- (United States) Coco Gauff defeated Aryna Sabalenka, 6–7^{(5–7)}, 6–2, 6–4

Coco Gauff defeated Aryna Sabalenka in the final, 6–7^{(5–7)}, 6–2, 6–4 to win the women's singles tennis title. It was her first French Open singles title and second major singles title overall. Gauff was the first American to win the title since Serena Williams in 2015. It was the first French Open final between the world No. 1 and 2 since 2013, and the first at any major since the 2018 Australian Open. Sabalenka was the first woman to reach the final of three consecutive majors since Williams in 2016.

Iga Świątek was the three-time defending champion, but lost in the semifinals to Sabalenka. The defeat ended her 26-match win streak in the event, second only to Chris Evert's 29 consecutive wins.

Ranked No. 361, Loïs Boisson was the first Frenchwoman to reach the singles semifinals of the French Open since Marion Bartoli in 2011, and the first wildcard to do so in the Open Era. Boisson was only the third woman in the Open Era to reach the semifinals of a major on her singles main-draw debut, after Monica Seles and Jennifer Capriati at the 1989 and 1990 French Opens, respectively.

The lack of women's matches being played at night at the French Open became a topic of discussion. 2025 was the second consecutive year that the French Tennis Federation did not schedule a women's singles match for a night session on Court Philippe Chatrier. Ons Jabeur said that it was unfortunate and wrote on social media that "honouring one side of the sport shouldn't mean ignoring the other. The women's game has been writing its own legacy loudly, brilliantly, and for far too long without too much recognition." Amélie Mauresmo, the tournament director of the French Open, said that the schedule was not meant to send a message that women were unworthy of playing at night and that the primary consideration for scheduling night sessions was the potential length of a match.

=== Men's doubles ===
- (Spain) Marcel Granollers / (Argentina) Horacio Zeballos defeated (United Kingdom) Joe Salisbury / (United Kingdom) Neal Skupski, 6–0, 6–7^{(5–7)}, 7–5

=== Women's doubles ===
- (Italy) Sara Errani / (Italy) Jasmine Paolini defeated (Kazakhstan) Anna Danilina / (Serbia) Aleksandra Krunić 6–4, 2–6, 6–1

=== Mixed doubles ===
- (Italy) Sara Errani / (Italy) Andrea Vavassori defeated (United States) Taylor Townsend / (United States) Evan King, 6–4, 6–2

=== Wheelchair men's singles ===
- (Japan) Tokito Oda defeated (United Kingdom) Alfie Hewett, 6–4, 7–6^{(8–6)}

=== Wheelchair women's singles ===
- (Japan) Yui Kamiji defeated (Netherlands) Aniek van Koot, 6–2, 6–2

=== Wheelchair quad singles ===
- (Israel) Guy Sasson defeated (Netherlands) Niels Vink, 6–4, 7–5

=== Wheelchair men's doubles ===
- (United Kingdom) Alfie Hewett / (United Kingdom) Gordon Reid defeated (France) Stéphane Houdet / (Japan) Tokito Oda 6–4, 1–6, [10–7]

=== Wheelchair women's doubles ===
- (Japan) Yui Kamiji / (South Africa) Kgothatso Montjane defeated (China) Li Xiaohui / (China) Wang Ziying, 4–6, 7–5, [10–7]

=== Wheelchair quad doubles ===
- (Israel) Guy Sasson / (Netherlands) Niels Vink defeated (Turkey) Ahmet Kaplan / (South Africa) Donald Ramphadi, 6–3, 6–4

=== Boys' singles ===
- (Germany) Niels McDonald defeated (Germany) Max Schönhaus, 6–7^{(5–7)} 6–0, 6–3

=== Girls' singles ===
- (Austria) Lilli Tagger defeated (United Kingdom) Hannah Klugman, 6–2, 6–0

=== Boys' doubles ===
- (Finland) Oskari Paldanius / (Poland) Alan Ważny defeated (United States) Noah Johnston / (United States) Benjamin Willwerth 6–2, 6–3

=== Girls' doubles ===
- (Germany) Eva Bennemann / (Germany) Sonja Zhenikhova defeated (Czech Republic) Alena Kovačková / (Czech Republic) Jana Kovačková, 4–6, 6–4, [10–8]

=== Wheelchair boys' singles ===
- (Austria) Maximilian Taucher defeated (United States) Charlie Cooper 6–2, 7–6^{(7–3)}

=== Wheelchair girls' singles ===
- (Brazil) Vitória Miranda defeated (United States) Sabina Czauz 6–3, 6–2

=== Wheelchair boys' doubles ===
- (United States) Charlie Cooper / (Austria) Maximilian Taucher defeated (Brazil) Luiz Calixto / (Belgium) Alexander Lantermann 6–4, 6–0

=== Wheelchair girls' doubles ===
- (Belgium) Luna Gryp / (Brazil) Vitória Miranda defeated (United States) Sabina Czauz / (Sweden) Emma Gjerseth 6–3, 6–2

== Point distribution and prize money ==
=== Point distribution ===
Below is a series of tables for each competition showing the ranking points that were offered for each event.

==== Senior points ====
Event	W	F	SF	QF	Round of 16	Round of 32	Round of 64	Round of 128	Q	Q3	Q2	Q1
Men's singles	2000	1300	800	400	200	100	50	10	30	16	8	0
Men's doubles	2000	1200	720	360	180	90	0	N/A				
Women's singles	2000	1300	780	430	240	130	70	10	40	30	20	2
Women's doubles	2000	1300	780	430	240	130	10	N/A				

==== Wheelchair points ====
Event	W	F	SF	QF	Round of 16
Singles	800	500	375	200	100
Doubles	800	500	375	100	N/A
Quad singles	800	500	375	200	100
Quad doubles	800	500	375	100	N/A

==== Junior points ====
Event	W	F	SF	QF	Round of 16	Round of 32	Q	Q3
Boys' singles	1000	700	490	300	180	90	25	20
Girls' singles	1000	700	490	300	180	90	25	20
Boys' doubles	750	525	367	225	135	N/A		
Girls' doubles	750	525	367	225	135	N/A		

=== Prize money ===
The French Open total prize money for 2025 was €56,352,000, an increase of 5.37% compared to 2024.

Event	Winner	Finalist	Semifinals	Quarterfinals	Round of 16	Round of 32	Round of 64	Round of 128	Q3	Q2	Q1
Singles	€2,550,000	€1,275,000	€690,000	€440,000	€265,000	€168,000	€117,000	€78,000	€43,000	€29,500	€21,000
Doubles^{1}	€590,000	€295,000	€148,000	€80,000	€43,500	€27,500	€17,500	—N/a	—N/a	—N/a	—N/a
Mixed doubles^{1}	€122,000	€61,000	€31,000	€17,500	€10,000	€5,000	—N/a	—N/a	—N/a	—N/a	—N/a
Wheelchair singles	€63,900	€31,950	€20,600	€12,360	€8,750	—N/a	—N/a	—N/a	—N/a	—N/a	—N/a
Wheelchair doubles^{1}	€21,650	€11,350	€8,250	€5,150	—N/a	—N/a	—N/a	—N/a	—N/a	—N/a	—N/a
Quad wheelchair singles	€62,000	€31,000	€20,000	€12,000	—N/a	—N/a	—N/a	—N/a	—N/a	—N/a	—N/a
Quad wheelchair doubles^{1}	€21,000	€11,000	€8,000	—N/a	—N/a	—N/a	—N/a	—N/a	—N/a	—N/a	—N/a

- ^{1} Prize money for doubles is per team.

Preceded by 2024 French Open	French Open	Succeeded by 2026 French Open
Preceded by 2025 Australian Open	Grand Slam events	Succeeded by 2025 Wimbledon Championships
