= L&T Mumbai Open =

Mumbai Open
- 2026 Mumbai Open

WTA 125
- Founded: 2017
- Editions: 4
- Location: Mumbai; India
- Venue: Cricket Club of India (2017–18, 2024–)
- Category: WTA 125
- Surface: DecoTurf (hard) – outdoors
- Draw: 32S / 16Q / 8D
- Prize money: $115,000 (2026)
- Website: https://mslta.org/LandingPage/wta/

Current champions (2026)
- Singles: (Thailand) Mananchaya Sawangkaew
- Doubles: (Russia) Polina Iatcenko (Russia) Elena Pridankina

The Mumbai Open is a professional tennis tournament played on hard courts. It is currently part of the WTA 125 tournaments. It is held in Mumbai, India, with the first edition held in 2017. The tournament was not held between 2019 and 2023 but eventually resumed in the 2024 edition.

The Maharashtra State Lawn Tennis Association (MSLTA) and the Maharashtra State Government came together to reinstate the event, the first of its kind to be held in India since the 2012 Royal Indian Open and the second overall WTA event in India in almost a decade. The Cricket Club of India hosted the event in 2017.

The 2017 and 2018 editions were sponsored by Larsen & Toubro.

== Past finals ==
=== Singles ===
Year	Champion	Runner-up	Score
2026	(Thailand) Mananchaya Sawangkaew	(Austria) Lilli Tagger	6–4, 6–3
2025	(Switzerland) Jil Teichmann	(Thailand) Mananchaya Sawangkaew	6–3, 6–4
2024	(Latvia) Darja Semeņistaja	(Australia) Storm Hunter	5–7, 7–6^{(8–6)}, 6–2
2019–2023 not held
2018	(Thailand) Luksika Kumkhum	(Russia) Irina Khromacheva	1–6, 6–2, 6–3
2017	(Belarus) Aryna Sabalenka	(Slovenia) Dalila Jakupović	6–2, 6–3
↑ WTA 125K series event ↑

=== Doubles ===
Year	Champions	Runners-up	Score
2026	Polina Iatcenko; Elena Pridankina (2)	(Argentina) Nicole Fossa Huergo (Thailand) Mananchaya Sawangkaew	7–6^{(7–3)}, 1–6, [10–5]
2025	Amina Anshba; Elena Pridankina	(Netherlands) Arianne Hartono (India) Prarthana Thombare	7–6^{(7–4)}, 2–6, [10–7]
2024	(Slovenia) Dalila Jakupović (United States) Sabrina Santamaria	(Netherlands) Arianne Hartono (India) Prarthana Thombare	6–4, 6–3
2019–2023 not held
2018	(Russia) Natela Dzalamidze (Russia) Veronika Kudermetova	(Netherlands) Bibiane Schoofs (Czech Republic) Barbora Štefková	6–4, 7–6^{(7–4)}
2017	(Mexico) Victoria Rodriguez (Netherlands) Bibiane Schoofs	(Slovenia) Dalila Jakupović (Russia) Irina Khromacheva	7–5, 3–6, [10–7]
↑ WTA 125K series event ↑

== See also ==
- WTA Indian Open
- Royal Indian Open
