= Mananchaya Sawangkaew =

Thai tennis player (born 2002)

Mananchaya Sawangkaew มนัญชญา สว่างแก้ว
- Sawangkaew in 2026 Wimbledon Championships
- Country (sports): Thailand
- Born: 10 July 2002 (age 24) Sing Buri, Thailand
- Plays: Right-handed (two-handed backhand)
- College: Oklahoma State
- Prize money: $999,250

Singles
- Career record: 230–116
- Career titles: 1 WTA 125, 5 ITF
- Highest ranking: No. 77ª (2 November 2026)
- Current ranking: No. 77ª (2 November 2026)

Grand Slam singles results
- Australian Open: 1R (2026)
- French Open: Q2 (2025)
- Wimbledon: 3R (2026)
- US Open: 2R (2026)

Doubles
- Career record: 57–50
- Career titles: 3 ITF
- Highest ranking: No. 267ª (2 November 2026)
- Current ranking: No. 267ª (2 November 2026)

Team competitions
- Fed Cup: 10–4
Medal record
Women's tennis
Representing the Thailand
Southeast Asian Games
Silver medal – second place	2025 Thailand	Singles
Silver medal – second place	2025 Thailand	Doubles
Silver medal – second place	2025 Thailand	Women's team
- Last updated on: 14 September 2026.

Mananchaya Sawangkaew (Thai: มนัญชญา สว่างแก้ว; born 10 July 2002) is a Thai professional tennis player. She has a career-high WTA singles ranking of world No. 77, achieved on 2 November 2026, and a best doubles ranking of No. 267, also achieved on 2 November 2026. Sawangkaew has won five singles titles and three doubles titles on the ITF Women's Circuit. In February 2026, she won her first title on a WTA 125 tournament.

== Career ==
=== 2019: Juniors and Fed Cup debut ===
On the ITF Junior Circuit, she achieved a career-high combined ranking of No. 14, on 28 January 2019. She reached the quarterfinals of the girls' singles draw at the 2019 Australian Open.

Sawangkaew made her debut for Thailand Fed Cup team in 2019.

=== 2021–2022: College years ===
Sawangkaew attended the Oklahoma State University in 2021–2022.

=== 2024–2025: WTA Tour debut & first quarterfinal, Thai No. 1 & top 100 ===
Sawangkaew made her WTA Tour main-draw debut at the 2024 Thailand Open 2 in Hua Hin after qualifying but lost to eventual champion Rebecca Šramková. She also qualified for the next tournament, the WTA 1000 China Open making her debut at this level and defeated fellow qualifier Zarina Diyas in straight sets for her first WTA Tour win, but lost in the second round to top seed Aryna Sabalenka. As a result, she reached a new career-high singles ranking of No. 167 on 7 October 2024 (and a week later of No. 165) and became the Thai number-one player.

Sawangkaew qualified for the main draw of the 2024 Guangzhou Open and defeated lucky loser Ella Seidel for a second time, having previously beaten her in the last round of qualifying. In the second round Sawangkaew overcame third seed Yuan Yue to become the first Thai player to reach a WTA Tour quarterfinal since Luksika Kumkhum in Hong Kong in 2018. She lost in the last eight to eventual champion Olga Danilović. As a result, she reached the top 150 on 28 October 2024. At the next and last 2024 Asian swing tournament, the Jiangxi Open, Sawangkaew qualified for the main draw and recorded wins over seventh seed Lucia Bronzetti, and then Zheng Saisai against whom she saved two match points, to reach back-to-back quarterfinals. Once again she went out at the last eight stage, this time losing to Laura Siegemund.

Following the 2025 French Open, Sawangkaew made her top 100 debut on 9 June 2025.

=== 2026: Major debut and third round ===
Sawangkaew made her major main-draw debut at the 2026 Australian Open, after qualifying, losing to 28th seed Emma Raducanu in the opening round.

At the 2026 Wimbledon Championships, she again qualified for the main draw and this time reached the third round for the first time in her career defeating Roland Garros finalist Maja Chwalinska and Alycia Parks. Mananchaya was the second Thai woman to reach the third round at Wimbledon after Tamarine Tanasugarn, and the third Thai woman to reach the third round of a major after Tamarine and Luksika Kumkhum.

== Performance timeline ==
Key
W	F	SF	QF	#R	RR	Q#	P#	DNQ	A	Z#	PO	G	S	B	NMS	NTI	P	NH

(W) winner; (F) finalist; (SF) semifinalist; (QF) quarterfinalist; (#R) rounds 4, 3, 2, 1; (RR) round-robin stage; (Q#) qualification round; (P#) preliminary round; (DNQ) did not qualify; (A) absent; (Z#) Davis/Fed Cup Zonal Group (with number indication) or (PO) play-off; (G) gold, (S) silver or (B) bronze Olympic/Paralympic medal; (NMS) not a Masters tournament; (NTI) not a Tier I tournament; (P) postponed; (NH) not held; (SR) strike rate (events won / competed); (W–L) win–loss record.
To avoid confusion and double counting, these charts are updated at the conclusion of a tournament or when the player's participation has ended.

=== Singles ===
Current through the 2026 US Open.

Tournament	2024	2025	2026	SR	W–L
Grand Slam tournaments
Australian Open	A	Q2	1R	0 / 1	0–1
French Open	A	Q2	A	0 / 0	0–0
Wimbledon	Q1	A	3R	0 / 1	2–1
US Open	Q3	A	2R	0 / 1	1–1
Win–loss	0–0	0–0	3–3	0 / 3	3–3
WTA 1000 tournaments
Qatar Open	A	A	A	0 / 0	0–0
Dubai Championships	A	A	A	0 / 0	0–0
Indian Wells Open	A	Q1	Q2	0 / 0	0–0
Miami Open	A	Q1	A	0 / 0	0–0
Madrid Open	A	A	A	0 / 0	0–0
Italian Open	A	A	A	0 / 0	0–0
Canadian Open	A	A	Q1	0 / 0	0–0
Cincinnati Open	A	A	1R	0 / 1	0–1
China Open	2R	A	A	0 / 1	1–1
Wuhan Open	A	A	1R	0 / 1	0–1
Win–loss	1–1	0–0	0–2	0 / 3	1–3

== WTA 125 finals ==
=== Singles: 2 (1 title, 1 runner-up) ===
Result	Date	Tournament	Surface	Opponents	Score
Loss	Feb 2025	Mumbai Open, India	Hard	(Switzerland) Jil Teichmann	3–6, 4–6
Win	Feb 2026	Mumbai Open, India	Hard	(Austria) Lilli Tagger	6–4, 6–3

=== Doubles: 1 (runner-up) ===
Result	Date	Tournament	Surface	Partner	Opponents	Score
Loss	Feb 2026	Mumbai Open, India	Hard	(Argentina) Nicole Fossa Huergo	Polina Iatcenko; Elena Pridankina	6–7^{(3–7)}, 6–1, [5–10]

== ITF Circuit finals ==
=== Singles: 13 (5 titles, 8 runner-ups) ===
Legend W100 tournaments (1–1) W75 tournaments (1–1) W40/50 tournaments (1–2) W25 tournaments (1–1) W15 tournaments (1–3)	Finals by surface Hard (5–8)

Result	W–L	Date	Tournament	Tier	Surface	Opponent	Score
Win	1–0	May 2018	ITF Hua Hin, Thailand	W15	Hard	(Thailand) Bunyawi Thamchaiwat	1–6, 7–6^{(3)}, 2–1 ret.
Loss	1–1	Oct 2019	ITF Hua Hin, Thailand	W15	Hard	(Japan) Moyuka Uchijima	2–6, 4–6
Loss	1–2	Jun 2022	ITF Chiang Rai, Thailand	W15	Hard	(Japan) Naho Sato	4–6, 2–6
Loss	1–3	Nov 2022	ITF Sharm El Sheikh, Egypt	W15	Hard	Aliona Falei	1–6, 5–7
Loss	1–4	Jan 2023	ITF Nonthaburi, Thailand	W40	Hard	(Thailand) Lanlana Tararudee	6–2, 1–6, 0–6
Loss	1–5	May 2023	ITF Goyang, South Korea	W25	Hard	(United States) Hanna Chang	2–6, 4–6
Win	2–5	Jul 2023	ITF Nakhon Si Thammarat, Thailand	W25	Hard	(India) Sahaja Yamalapalli	6–4, 6–0
Loss	2–6	Aug 2023	ITF Hong Kong, China SAR	W40	Hard	(Chinese Taipei) Yang Ya-yi	3–6, 6–4, 3–6
Win	3–6	Jan 2024	ITF Nonthaburi, Thailand	W50	Hard	(Croatia) Antonia Ružić	6–1, 2–6, 6–2
Loss	3–7	Aug 2024	Lexington Challenger, US	W75	Hard	(China) Wei Sijia	5–7, 4–6
Loss	3–8	Apr 2025	Kangaroo Cup, Japan	W100	Hard	(China) Zhang Shuai	3–6, 4–6
Win	4–8	Jan 2026	ITF Nonthaburi, Thailand	W75	Hard	(Italy) Lisa Pigato	6–1, 6–4
Win	5–8	May 2026	Kangaroo Cup, Japan	W100	Hard	(Australia) Emerson Jones	7–6^{(2)}, 6–3

=== Doubles: 7 (3 titles, 4 runner-ups) ===
Legend W100 tournaments (1–1) W25/35 tournaments (1–1) W15 tournaments (1–2)	Finals by surface Hard (3–4)

Result	W–L	Date	Tournament	Tier	Surface	Partner	Opponents	Score
Loss	0–1	Dec 2018	ITF Hua Hin, Thailand	W15	Hard	(Chinese Taipei) Joanna Garland	(Indonesia) Nadia Ravita (Indonesia) Aldila Sutjiadi	2–6, 4–6
Win	1–1	Apr 2019	ITF Sharm El Sheik, Egypt	W15	Hard	(Thailand) Thasaporn Naklo	(Slovakia) Katarína Kužmová (Kazakhstan) Zhibek Kulambayeva	6–3, 7–5
Loss	1–2	Jan 2020	ITF Nonthaburi, Thailand	W25	Hard	(Thailand) Supapitch Kuearum	(India) Ankita Raina (Netherlands) Bibiane Schoofs	4–6, 2–6
Loss	1–3	Nov 2022	ITF Sharm El Sheikh, Egypt	W15	Hard	(China) Dong Na	(Chinese Taipei) Cho Yi-tsen (Chinese Taipei) Cho I-hsuan	2–6, 6–7^{(4)}
Loss	1–4	Apr 2025	Tokyo Open, Japan	W100	Hard	(Thailand) Lanlana Tararudee	(China) Guo Hanyu (Japan) Ena Shibahara	7–5, 6–7^{(1)}, [5–10]
Win	2–4	Dec 2025	Dubai Tennis Challenge, UAE	W100	Hard	(China) Gao Xinyu	Rada Zolotareva; Vera Zvonareva	4–6, 7–5, [10–7]
Win	3–4	Jul 2026	Dallas Summer Series, US	W35	Hard (i)	(Hong Kong) Cody Wong	(United States) Sophie Llewellyn (Ukraine) Anita Sahdiieva	6–3, 6–1
