= Elena Pridankina =

Russian tennis player (born 2005)

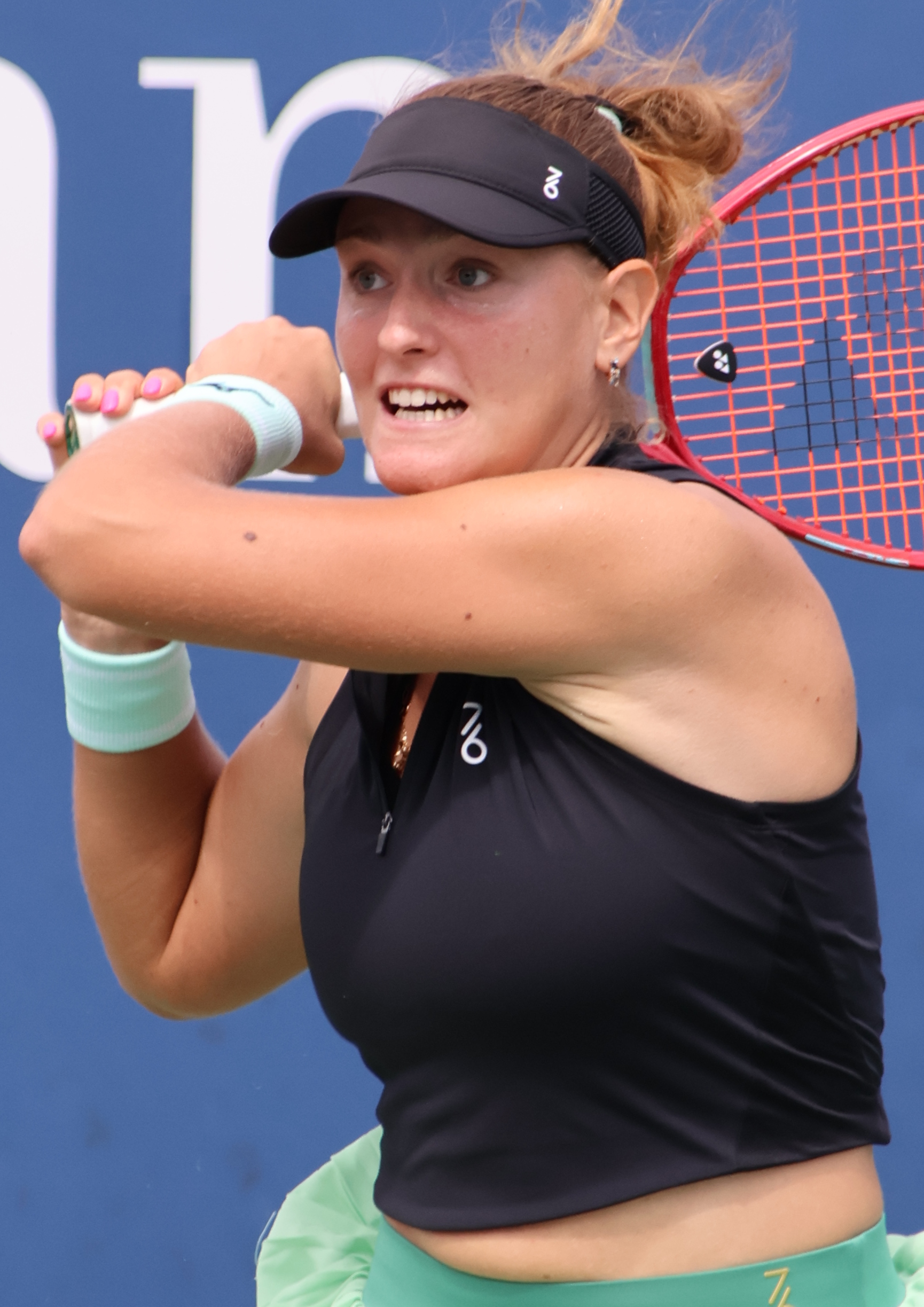
- Pridankina at the 2026 US Open
- Full name: Elena Ivanovna Pridankina
- Country (sports): Russia
- Born: 30 August 2005 (age 21) Vidnoye, Russia
- Plays: Right-handed
- Prize money: $720,547

Singles
- Career record: 191–98
- Career titles: 6 ITF
- Highest ranking: No. 168 (19 May 2025)
- Current ranking: No. 196 (28 September 2026)

Grand Slam singles results
- Australian Open: Q2 (2026)
- French Open: 1R (2026)
- Wimbledon: Q3 (2026)
- US Open: Q3 (2026)

Doubles
- Career record: 144–83
- Career titles: 1
- Highest ranking: No. 70 (27 July 2026)
- Current ranking: No. 71 (28 September 2026)

Grand Slam doubles results
- Australian Open: 1R (2026)
- French Open: 2R (2025, 2026)
- Wimbledon: 1R (2025, 2026)
- US Open: 2R (2026)
- Last updated on: 10 October 2026.

Elena Ivanovna Pridankina (Russian: Елена Ивановна Приданкина, born 30 August 2005) is a Russian professional tennis player. She has a career-high singles ranking by the WTA of No. 168, achieved on 19 May 2025, and a best doubles ranking of No. 70, reached on 27 July 2026.

Pridankina has won one WTA Tour doubles title, at the 2025 Jiangxi Open with Quinn Gleason, and five WTA 125 doubles titles.

== Personal life ==
Pridankina's father, Ivan Pridankin, is a former coach of Daniil Medvedev.

== Career ==
Ranked No. 179, Pridankina made her WTA Tour debut at the 2024 Guangzhou Open, after entering the main draw as a lucky loser but lost to Caroline Dolehide.

She secured her first WTA Tour win at the 2024 Jiangxi Open defeating Ella Seidel, before losing in the second round to fifth seed Kamilla Rakhimova.

Teaming with Quinn Gleason, Pridankina won her first career doubles title at the 2025 Jiangxi Open, defeating Ekaterina Ovcharenko and Emily Webley-Smith in the final.

She qualified to make her Grand Slam tournament main-draw debut at the French Open, losing to Oleksandra Oliynykova in the first round.

== WTA Tour finals ==
=== Doubles: 1 (title) ===
Legend WTA 250 (1–0)	Finals by surface Hard (1–0)	Finals by setting Outdoor (1–0)

Result	W–L	Date	Tournament	Tier	Surface	Partner	Opponents	Score
Win	1–0	Nov 2025	Jiangxi Open, China	WTA 250	Hard	(United States) Quinn Gleason	Ekaterina Ovcharenko (United Kingdom) Emily Webley-Smith	6–4, 2–6, [10–6]

== WTA 125 finals ==
=== Doubles: 7 (6 titles, 1 runner-up) ===
Result	W–L	Date	Tournament	Surface	Partner	Opponents	Score
Win	1–0	Feb 2025	Mumbai Open, India	Hard	Amina Anshba	(Netherlands) Arianne Hartono (India) Prarthana Thombare	7–6^{(4)}, 2–6, [10–7]
Loss	1–1	Jun 2025	Makarska Open, Croatia	Clay	(Georgia (country)) Oksana Kalashnikova	(Czech Republic) Jesika Malečková (Czech Republic) Miriam Škoch	6–2, 3–6, [4–10]
Win	2–1	Oct 2025	Jinan Open, China	Hard	Ekaterina Reyngold	(India) Rutuja Bhosale (China) Zheng Wushuang	6–1, 6–3
Win	3–1	Feb 2026	Mumbai Open, India (2)	Hard	Polina Iatcenko	(Argentina) Nicole Fossa Huergo (Thailand) Mananchaya Sawangkaew	7–6^{(3)}, 1–6, [10–5]
Win	4–1	Apr 2026	Open Villa de Madrid, Spain	Clay	(Spain) Irene Burillo	(Romania) Irina Bara (Latvia) Darja Semeņistaja	4–6, 6–3, [10–3]
Win	5–1	May 2026	Catalonia Open, Spain	Clay	(China) Tang Qianhui	(Slovakia) Tereza Mihalíková (United Kingdom) Olivia Nicholls	6–1, 6–3
Win	6–1	Oct 2026	Samsun Open, Turkiye	Hard	Anastasia Tikhonova	(India) Rutuja Bhosale (Australia) Elena Micic	7–6(5), 6–7(7), [10–3]

== ITF Circuit finals ==
=== Singles: 11 (6 titles, 5 runner-ups) ===
Legend W75 tournaments (1–1) W50 tournaments (0–2) W25 tournaments (0–2) W15 tournaments (5–0)	Finals by surface Hard (3–4) Clay (3–1)

Result	W–L	Date	Tournament	Tier	Surface	Opponent	Score
Win	1–0	Aug 2022	ITF Cairo, Egypt	W15	Clay	(Romania) Alexandra Iordache	6–1, 6–1
Win	2–0	Sep 2022	ITF Sharm El Sheikh, Egypt	W15	Hard	(Slovakia) Katarína Kuzmová	3–6, 6–4, 6–4
Win	3–0	Oct 2022	ITF Sharm El Sheikh, Egypt	W15	Hard	Anastasiia Gureva	6–7^{(5)}, 6–4, 7–6^{(2)}
Win	4–0	Apr 2023	ITF Sharm El Sheikh, Egypt	W15	Hard	(China) Wang Meiling	6–3, 6–1
Win	5–0	Sep 2023	ITF Kursumlijska Banja, Serbia	W15	Clay	(Germany) Mara Guth	7–6^{(4)}, ret.
Loss	5–1	Dec 2023	ITF Sharm El Sheikh, Egypt	W25	Hard	(Georgia (country)) Mariam Bolkvadze	2–6, 1–6
Loss	5–2	Feb 2024	ITF Sharm El Sheikh, Egypt	W35	Hard	(Georgia (country)) Mariam Bolkvadze	0–6, 3–6
Loss	5–3	Mar 2024	Trnava Indoor, Slovakia	W50	Hard (i)	Anastasiia Gureva	6–3, 3–6, 4–6
Loss	5–4	Aug 2024	Zagreb Open, Croatia	W50	Clay	(Italy) Giorgia Pedone	6–2, 2–6, 5–7
Win	6–4	Aug 2024	Ladies Open Amstetten, Austria	W75	Clay	(Ukraine) Valeriya Strakhova	6–0, 6–4
Loss	6–5	Feb 2025	Trnava Indoor, Slovakia	W75	Hard (i)	(Croatia) Antonia Ružić	2–6, 6–4, 3–6

=== Doubles: 21 (11 titles, 10 runner-ups) ===
Legend W100 tournaments W80 tournaments W75 tournaments W40/50 tournaments W25 tournaments W15 tournaments	Finals by surface Hard (8–7) Clay (3–3)

Result	W–L	Date	Tournament	Tier	Surface	Partner	Opponents	Score
Loss	0–1	Aug 2022	ITF Cairo, Egypt	W15	Clay	Elizaveta Shebekina	(Egypt) Yasmin Ezzat (Greece) Dimitra Pavlou	5–7, 3–6
Win	1–1	Sep 2022	ITF Sharm El Sheikh, Egypt	W15	Hard	Aglaya Fedorova	(Egypt) Yasmin Ezzat; Aliona Falei	7–5, 6–1
Loss	1–2	Oct 2022	ITF Sharm El Sheikh, Egypt	W15	Hard	Aglaya Fedorova	(Italy) Anastasia Abbagnato (Italy) Beatrice Stagno	6–2, 3–6, [5–10]
Win	2–2	Oct 2022	ITF Sharm El Sheikh, Egypt	W15	Hard	Anastasiia Gureva	(Chinese Taipei) Cho I-hsuan (Chinese Taipei) Cho Yi-tsen	6–7^{(3)}, 6–1, [10–6]
Win	3–2	Jul 2023	ITF Aschaffenburg, Germany	W25	Clay	(Czech Republic) Ivana Šebestová	(France) Manon Léonard (France) Lucie Nguyen Tan	2–6, 6–2, [10–5]
Loss	3–3	Sep 2023	ITF Kursumlijska Banja, Serbia	W15	Clay	(Germany) Mara Guth	(Greece) Eleni Christofi (Serbia) Katarina Jokić	2–6, 3–6
Loss	3–4	Oct 2023	Internationaux de Poitiers, France	W80	Hard (i)	Ekaterina Maklakova	(France) Jessika Ponchet (Netherlands) Bibiane Schoofs	5–7, 4–6
Win	4–4	Nov 2023	ITF Funchal, Portugal	W40	Hard	Anastasia Kovaleva	(France) Yasmine Mansouri (Portugal) Inês Murta	6–2, 6–3
Win	5–4	Nov 2023	ITF Lousada, Portugal	W25	Hard (i)	(Germany) Mara Guth	(Germany) Alicia Melosch (Germany) Johanna Silva	6–1, 6–1
Loss	5–5	Nov 2023	ITF Lousada, Portugal	W25	Hard (i)	(Canada) Kayla Cross	(Belgium) Eliessa Vanlangendonck (Netherlands) Stéphanie Visscher	walkover
Loss	5–6	Jul 2024	Open de Montpellier, France	W75	Clay	Ekaterina Yashina	(Croatia) Mariana Dražić; Iryna Shymanovich	6–1, 4–6, [8–10]
Win	6–6	Aug 2024	Přerov Cup, Czech Republic	W75	Clay	(Czech Republic) Julie Štruplová	(Germany) Noma Noha Akugue (Greece) Sapfo Sakellaridi	6–3, 6–4
Win	7–6	Oct 2024	Bratislava Open, Slovakia	W75	Hard (i)	(Netherlands) Isabelle Haverlag	(Slovakia) Katarína Kužmová (Slovakia) Nina Vargová	7–5, 6–2
Loss	7–7	Dec 2024	Dubai Tennis Challenge, UAE	W100	Hard	(Netherlands) Isabelle Haverlag	(Czech Republic) Anastasia Dețiuc; Anastasia Tikhonova	3–6, 7–6^{(7)}, [8–10]
Loss	7–8	Jan 2025	Bengaluru Open, India	W100	Hard	Amina Anshba	(United States) Jessie Aney (United States) Jessica Failla	2–6, 6–4, [6–10]
Win	8–8	Jan 2025	Pune Championships, India	W75	Hard	Alevtina Ibragimova	Maria Kozyreva; Iryna Shymanovich	6–2, 1–6, [10–8]
Loss	8–9	Feb 2025	Trnava Indoor, Slovakia	W75	Hard (i)	(Switzerland) Céline Naef	(Czech Republic) Jesika Malečková (Czech Republic) Miriam Škoch	7–5, 3–6, [2–10]
Win	9–9	Mar 2025	Trnava Indoor, Slovakia	W75	Hard (i)	(Netherlands) Isabelle Haverlag	(Belgium) Magali Kempen (France) Jessika Ponchet	6–2, 6–3
Win	10–9	Jul 2025	Ladies Open Hechingen, Germany	W75	Clay	(Slovakia) Renáta Jamrichová	(China) Feng Shuo (China) Li Zongyu	6–2, 6–2
Loss	10–10	Jan 2026	ITF Fujairah Championships, UAE	W100	Hard	(Netherlands) Isabelle Haverlag	(United Kingdom) Harriet Dart (United Kingdom) Maia Lumsden	1–6, 0–6
Win	11–10	Mar 2026	Open Nantes Atlantique, France	W50	Hard (i)	Kira Pavlova	(France) Tiphanie Lemaître (Ukraine) Veronika Podrez	6–4, 6–3
