= Shrivalli Bhamidipaty =

Indian tennis player (born 2001)

- Full name: Shrivalli Rashmikaa Bhamidipaty
- Country (sports): India
- Born: 12 December 2001 (age 24) Telangana, India
- Plays: Right (two-handed backhand)
- Prize money: $84,719

Singles
- Career record: 118–100
- Career titles: 2 ITF
- Highest ranking: No. 300 (28 October 2024)
- Current ranking: No. 640 (31 August 2026)

Doubles
- Career record: 97–70
- Career titles: 7 ITF
- Highest ranking: No. 266 (9 June 2025)
- Current ranking: No. 456 (31 August 2026)

Team competitions
- Fed Cup: 7–3
Medal record
Women's tennis
Representing India
- Last updated on: 2 September 2026.

Shrivalli Rashmikaa Bhamidipaty (born 12 December 2001) is an Indian professional tennis player who plays for the national team. She has been ranked as high as No. 300 in singles by the WTA on 28 October 2024.

== Early life ==
Shrivalli is from Hyderabad, Telangana. She was born to BRN Prasad, a chartered accountant, and B Rajshri. She did her schooling from Delhi Public School, Nacharam, Hyderabad. She finished her graduation in commerce and plans to do a course in chartered accountancy in London. She started tennis at the age of 11, attracted by the glamorous tennis outfits. She trains under coach Anand Kumar in Hyderabad and has also roped in the services of former Davis Cupper Vishal Uppal from Delhi to fine tune her game. She is sponsored by Phoenix group and Lakshya Sports Edelgive Foundation.

== Career ==
In April 2025, Shrivalli she made her debut for India women's team in the Billie Jean King Cup Asia Oceania Group 1 at the Balewadi Sports Complex in Pune and won all her five singles matches including three against higher ranked players. India made it to the play offs of the Cup. She first defeated Aishi Das of New Zealand 6–1, 6–1 on Day 1, and then beat Lanlana Tararudee of Thailand 6–2, 6–4 in second singles. She also won her matches against Hong Kong. On 11 April 2025, she defeated 207 ranked Joanna Garland of Chinese Taipei 6–2, 7–6 in 2 hours and 38 minutes. In her fifth and final match, she defeated 248 ranked Sohyun Park of South Korea 5–7, 6–3, 7–6 in 2 hours and 52 minutes on 12 April.

In February 2024, she took part in the WTA Mumbai Open and in March 2024, she played the final of the Indore ITF event, hours after she was discharged from a hospital. In December 2024, she won the ITF tournament in Maharashtra, where she beat Thamchaiwat B of Thailand in the final, in straight sets. In 2023, she won her first senior national title, the Fenesta Open National Tennis Championship 2023. In November 2023, she won her maiden ITF title winning the Bowring Institute ITF Women's World Tennis Tour finals in Bengaluru.
