= 2019 Internazionali Femminili di Palermo – Singles =

Singles
- 2019 Internazionali Femminili di Palermo

Final
- Champion: (Switzerland) Jil Teichmann
- Runner-up: (Netherlands) Kiki Bertens
- Score: 7–6^{(7–3)}, 6–2

Details
- Draw: 32
- Seeds: 8

Events
Singles	Doubles
- Internazionali Femminili di Palermo

Roberta Vinci was the champion the last time the tournament was held in 2013, but she has since retired from professional tennis.

Jil Teichmann won the title, defeating Kiki Bertens in the final, 7–6^{(7–3)}, 6–2.

== Seeds ==
1. (Netherlands) Kiki Bertens (final)
2. (France) Alizé Cornet (second round)
3. (Slovakia) Viktória Kužmová (second round)
4. (Slovenia) Tamara Zidanšek (second round)
5. (France) Pauline Parmentier (first round)
6. (Germany) Laura Siegemund (first round)
7. (Spain) Sara Sorribes Tormo (first round)
8. (Switzerland) Jil Teichmann (champion)

== Draw ==
Key

- Q = Qualifier
- WC = Wild card
- LL = Lucky loser
- Alt = Alternate
- ITF = ITF entry
- PR = Protected ranking
- SR = Special ranking
- SE = Special exempt
- JE = Junior exempt
- JR = Junior Accelerator Programme entrant
- CO = College Accelerator Programme entrant
- NG = Next Gen Accelerator Program entrant
- w/o = Walkover
- r = Retired
- d = Defaulted

=== Finals ===
Semifinals
1	(Netherlands) Kiki Bertens	6	7
(Spain) Paula Badosa	1	5
LL	(Russia) Liudmila Samsonova	3	1
8	(Switzerland) Jil Teichmann	6	6

Final
1	(Netherlands) Kiki Bertens	6^{3}	2
8	(Switzerland) Jil Teichmann	7^{7}	6

=== Top half ===
First round
1	(Netherlands) K Bertens	6	6
(Georgia (country)) E Gorgodze	0	1
Q	(Italy) J Pieri	2	3
(Serbia) A Krunić	6	6
Q	(Croatia) T Mrdeža	5	2
(Romania) I-C Begu	7	6
(Italy) J Paolini	6	6
6	(Germany) L Siegemund	1	4
3	(Slovakia) V Kužmová	6	3	6
Q	(Italy) E Cocciaretto	4	6	3
(Netherlands) A Rus	6	6
Q	(France) A Hesse	1	3
WC	(Italy) S Errani	1	6	4
LL	(Hungary) F Stollár	6	3	6
(Spain) P Badosa	6	7^{7}
5	(France) P Parmentier	4	6^{4}

Second round
1	(Netherlands) K Bertens	6	6
(Serbia) A Krunić	3	1
(Romania) I-C Begu	4	7	6^{4}
(Italy) J Paolini	6	5	7^{7}
3	(Slovakia) V Kužmová	4	4
(Netherlands) A Rus	6	6
LL	(Hungary) F Stollár	1	3
(Spain) P Badosa	6	6

Quarterfinals
1	(Netherlands) K Bertens	6	1	6
(Italy) J Paolini	4	6	1
(Netherlands) A Rus	2	1
(Spain) P Badosa	6	6

Semifinals
1	(Netherlands) K Bertens	6	7
(Spain) P Badosa	1	5

=== Bottom half ===
First round
7	(Spain) S Sorribes Tormo	4	5
(France) F Ferro	6	7
WC	(Italy) G Gatto-Monticone	6	1
(Germany) A Lottner	2	1^{r}
LL	(Russia) L Samsonova	6	6
Q	(Australia) J Fourlis	3	4
(Spain) L Arruabarrena	2	3
4	(Slovenia) T Zidanšek	6	6
8	(Switzerland) J Teichmann	7^{7}	7
(Australia) D Gavrilova	6^{3}	5
Q	(Brazil) G Cé	6	1	7^{7}
LL	(Spain) G García Pérez	4	6	6^{4}
PR	(Germany) A-L Friedsam	6	7^{8}
(Switzerland) S Vögele	2	6^{6}
WC	(Italy) M Trevisan	7^{7}	4	1
2	(France) A Cornet	6^{5}	6	6

Second round
(France) F Ferro	6	6
WC	(Italy) G Gatto-Monticone	3	2
LL	(Russia) L Samsonova	6	7
4	(Slovenia) T Zidanšek	2	5
8	(Switzerland) J Teichmann	6	7^{7}
Q	(Brazil) G Cé	1	6^{4}
PR	(Germany) A-L Friedsam	7	6
2	(France) A Cornet	5	4

Quarterfinals
(France) F Ferro	7^{7}	3	4
LL	(Russia) L Samsonova	6^{4}	6	6
8	(Switzerland) J Teichmann	6	1
PR	(Germany) A-L Friedsam	0	0^{r}

Semifinals
LL	(Russia) L Samsonova	3	1
8	(Switzerland) J Teichmann	6	6

== Qualifying ==
=== Seeds ===
1. (Ukraine) Katarina Zavatska (first round)
2. (Russia) Liudmila Samsonova (qualifying competition, lucky loser)
3. (Switzerland) Conny Perrin (first round)
4. (Croatia) Tereza Mrdeža (qualified)
5. (Hungary) Anna Bondár (first round)
6. (Italy) Martina Di Giuseppe (Special exempt into main draw)
7. (Spain) Georgina García Pérez (qualifying competition, lucky loser)
8. (China) Xu Shilin (qualifying competition)
9. (Hungary) Fanny Stollár (qualifying competition, lucky loser)
10. (France) Amandine Hesse (qualified)
11. (Chile) Daniela Seguel (first round)
12. (Liechtenstein) Kathinka von Deichmann (qualifying competition)

=== Qualifiers ===
1. (Brazil) Gabriela Cé
2. (France) Amandine Hesse
3. (Italy) Elisabetta Cocciaretto
4. (Croatia) Tereza Mrdeža
5. (Australia) Jaimee Fourlis
6. (Italy) Jessica Pieri

=== Lucky losers ===
1. (Russia) Liudmila Samsonova
2. (Spain) Georgina García Pérez
3. (Hungary) Fanny Stollár

=== Draw ===
==== First qualifier ====
First round
1	(Ukraine) Katarina Zavatska	7	4	4
(Brazil) Gabriela Cé	5	6	6
(Australia) Alison Bai	2	3
8	(China) Xu Shilin	6	6

Qualifying competition
(Brazil) Gabriela Cé	7	6
8	(China) Xu Shilin	5	0

==== Second qualifier ====
First round
2	(Russia) Liudmila Samsonova	6	6
(Argentina) Nadia Podoroska	1	0
(Italy) Deborah Chiesa	6	4	5
10	(France) Amandine Hesse	1	6	7

Qualifying competition
2	(Russia) Liudmila Samsonova	4	6^{10}
10	(France) Amandine Hesse	6	7^{12}

==== Third qualifier ====
First round
3	(Switzerland) Conny Perrin	6	3	6^{2}
WC	(Italy) Elisabetta Cocciaretto	3	6	7^{7}
(Italy) Cristiana Ferrando	1	2
9	(Hungary) Fanny Stollár	6	6

Qualifying competition
WC	(Italy) Elisabetta Cocciaretto	6	3	6
9	(Hungary) Fanny Stollár	3	6	4

==== Fourth qualifier ====
First round
4	(Croatia) Tereza Mrdeža	6	6
WC	(Italy) Federica Bilardo	2	3
(Italy) Anastasia Grymalska	5	1
12	(Liechtenstein) Kathinka von Deichmann	7	6

Qualifying competition
4	(Croatia) Tereza Mrdeža	6	5	7
12	(Liechtenstein) Kathinka von Deichmann	3	7	5

==== Fifth qualifier ====
First round
5	(Hungary) Anna Bondár	5	6	6^{7}
(Australia) Jaimee Fourlis	7	4	7^{9}
WC	(Italy) Federica Rossi	0	7	5
7	(Spain) Georgina García Pérez	6	5	7

Qualifying competition
(Australia) Jaimee Fourlis	6	6
7	(Spain) Georgina García Pérez	3	3

==== Sixth qualifier ====
First round
Alt	(Brazil) Laura Pigossi	6	6
WC	(Italy) Dalila Spiteri	4	2
(Italy) Jessica Pieri	6	6
11	(Chile) Daniela Seguel	4	4

Qualifying competition
Alt	(Brazil) Laura Pigossi	6	1	0
(Italy) Jessica Pieri	4	6	6
