= 2020 Internazionali Femminili di Palermo – Singles =

Singles
- 2020 Internazionali Femminili di Palermo

Final
- Champion: (France) Fiona Ferro
- Runner-up: (Estonia) Anett Kontaveit
- Score: 6–2, 7–5

Details
- Draw: 32
- Seeds: 8

Events
Singles	Doubles
← 2019 ·	Internazionali Femminili di Palermo	· 2021 →

Jil Teichmann was the defending champion, but chose not to participate.

Fiona Ferro won the title, defeating Anett Kontaveit in the final, 6–2, 7–5. Ferro became the first player to win a title on the WTA tour following the suspension of the tour due to the COVID-19 pandemic in March 2020.

== Seeds ==
1. (Croatia) Petra Martić (semifinals)
2. (Czech Republic) Markéta Vondroušová (first round)
3. (Greece) Maria Sakkari (first round)
4. (Estonia) Anett Kontaveit (final)
5. (Belgium) Elise Mertens (first round)
6. (Croatia) Donna Vekić (second round)
7. (Ukraine) Dayana Yastremska (quarterfinals)
8. (Russia) Ekaterina Alexandrova (second round)

== Draw ==
=== Key ===
- Q = Qualifier
- WC = Wild card
- LL = Lucky loser
- Alt = Alternate
- SE = Special exempt
- PR = Protected ranking
- ITF = ITF entry
- JE = Junior exempt
- w/o = Walkover
- r = Retired
- d = Defaulted
- SR = Special ranking

=== Finals ===
Semifinals
1	(Croatia) Petra Martić	2	4
4	(Estonia) Anett Kontaveit	6	6
(France) Fiona Ferro	2	6	7
(Italy) Camila Giorgi	6	2	5

Final
4	(Estonia) Anett Kontaveit	2	5
(France) Fiona Ferro	6	7

=== Top half ===
First round
1	(Croatia) P Martić	6	6
(Belgium) A Van Uytvanck	0	3
(Belgium) K Flipkens	4	2
Q	(Russia) L Samsonova	6	6
(Italy) J Paolini	5	6	6
(Russia) D Kasatkina	7	4	4
Q	(Belarus) A Sasnovich	6	6
5	(Belgium) E Mertens	4	1
4	(Estonia) A Kontaveit	6	6
(Romania) PM Țig	3	3
(Germany) L Siegemund	6	6
(Romania) I-C Begu	3	4
(Slovenia) P Hercog	6^{1}	3
WC	(Italy) E Cocciaretto	7^{7}	6
(Netherlands) A Rus	1	2
6	(Croatia) D Vekić	6	6

Second round
1	(Croatia) P Martić	5	6	6
Q	(Russia) L Samsonova	7	4	2
(Italy) J Paolini	0	2
Q	(Belarus) A Sasnovich	6	6
4	(Estonia) A Kontaveit	3	6	6
(Germany) L Siegemund	6	2	2
WC	(Italy) E Cocciaretto	6	6
6	(Croatia) D Vekić	2	4

Quarterfinals
1	(Croatia) P Martić	7^{7}	7^{7}
Q	(Belarus) A Sasnovich	6^{5}	6^{3}
4	(Estonia) A Kontaveit	6	4	6
WC	(Italy) E Cocciaretto	1	6	1

Semifinals
1	(Croatia) P Martić	2	4
4	(Estonia) A Kontaveit	6	6

=== Bottom half ===
First round
8	(Russia) E Alexandrova	5	6	6
(France) K Mladenovic	7	0	1
Q	(Argentina) N Podoroska	2	1
(France) F Ferro	6	6
WC	(Italy) S Errani	7	1	6
(Romania) S Cîrstea	5	6	4
(Czech Republic) Kr Plíšková	6	6
3	(Greece) M Sakkari	4	4
7	(Ukraine) D Yastremska	6	6
(Spain) S Sorribes Tormo	3	4
(Slovenia) T Zidanšek	6	4	4
LL	(France) O Dodin	2	6	6
(Italy) C Giorgi	7	6
(Sweden) R Peterson	5	4
Q	(Slovenia) K Juvan	1	7	6
2	(Czech Republic) M Vondroušová	6	5	4

Second round
8	(Russia) E Alexandrova	5	2
(France) F Ferro	7	6
WC	(Italy) S Errani	3	6	6
(Czech Republic) Kr Plíšková	6	4	3
7	(Ukraine) D Yastremska	6	6
LL	(France) O Dodin	2	4
(Italy) C Giorgi	3	6	6
Q	(Slovenia) K Juvan	6	2	4

Quarterfinals
(France) F Ferro	6	6
WC	(Italy) S Errani	4	1
7	(Ukraine) D Yastremska	6	6^{5}	3
(Italy) C Giorgi	4	7^{7}	6

Semifinals
(France) F Ferro	2	6	7
(Italy) C Giorgi	6	2	5

== Qualifying ==
=== Seeds ===
1. (Russia) Varvara Gracheva (second round)
2. (Spain) Aliona Bolsova (second round)
3. (Belgium) Greet Minnen (first round)
4. (France) Océane Dodin (qualifying competition, lucky loser)
5. (Russia) Liudmila Samsonova (qualified)
6. (Belarus) Aliaksandra Sasnovich (qualified)
7. (Slovenia) Kaja Juvan (qualified)
8. (Belgium) Ysaline Bonaventure (second round)

=== Qualifiers ===
1. (Slovenia) Kaja Juvan
2. (Russia) Liudmila Samsonova
3. (Belarus) Aliaksandra Sasnovich
4. (Argentina) Nadia Podoroska

=== Lucky loser ===
1. (France) Océane Dodin

=== Draw ===
==== First qualifier ====
First round
1	(Russia) Varvara Gracheva	6	6
WC	(Italy) Matilde Paoletti	0	1
(Italy) Giulia Gatto-Monticone	4	6^{6}
(Italy) Martina Trevisan	6	7^{8}
(Romania) Elena-Gabriela Ruse	7	6
WC	(Italy) Dalila Spiteri	5	2
(Poland) Magdalena Fręch	6	2	4
7	(Slovenia) Kaja Juvan	2	6	6

Second round
1	(Russia) Varvara Gracheva	2	0
(Italy) Martina Trevisan	6	6
(Romania) Elena-Gabriela Ruse	6	1	2
7	(Slovenia) Kaja Juvan	2	6	6

Qualifying competition
(Italy) Martina Trevisan	6^{8}	1
7	(Slovenia) Kaja Juvan	7^{10}	6

==== Second qualifier ====
First round
2	(Spain) Aliona Bolsova	6^{2}	6	6
WC	(Italy) Melania Delai	7^{7}	3	1
(Netherlands) Bibiane Schoofs	2	6	2
(Romania) Laura Ioana Paar	6	1	6
(Ukraine) Marta Kostyuk	6	6
Alt	(Chile) Daniela Seguel	1	2
Alt	(Croatia) Tereza Mrdeža	3	4
5	(Russia) Liudmila Samsonova	6	6

Second round
2	(Spain) Aliona Bolsova	6	5	4
(Romania) Laura Ioana Paar	4	7	6
(Ukraine) Marta Kostyuk	6	4	3
5	(Russia) Liudmila Samsonova	4	6	6

Qualifying competition
(Romania) Laura Ioana Paar	2	6^{9}
5	(Russia) Liudmila Samsonova	6	7^{11}

==== Third qualifier ====
First round
3	(Belgium) Greet Minnen	0	6	1
(Spain) Lara Arruabarrena	6	2	6
(Italy) Martina Di Giuseppe	0	6	6
(France) Chloé Paquet	6	2	4
(Czech Republic) Tereza Martincová	4	6	6
(Switzerland) Leonie Küng	6	2	1
(Russia) Anastasiya Komardina	5	2
6	(Belarus) Aliaksandra Sasnovich	7	6

Second round
(Spain) Lara Arruabarrena	6	6
(Italy) Martina Di Giuseppe	2	3
(Czech Republic) Tereza Martincová	3	0^{r}
6	(Belarus) Aliaksandra Sasnovich	6	0

Qualifying competition
(Spain) Lara Arruabarrena	5	6^{2}
6	(Belarus) Aliaksandra Sasnovich	7	7^{7}

==== Fourth qualifier ====
First round
4	(France) Océane Dodin	6	6
WC	(Italy) Federica Bilardo	3	1
(Belgium) Yanina Wickmayer	0	6	6
(Austria) Barbara Haas	6	2	3
(Hungary) Réka Luca Jani	3	1
(Argentina) Nadia Podoroska	6	6
(Netherlands) Indy de Vroome	6	6^{9}	2
8	(Belgium) Ysaline Bonaventure	3	7^{11}	6

Second round
4	(France) Océane Dodin	6	1	6
(Belgium) Yanina Wickmayer	2	6	1
(Argentina) Nadia Podoroska	6	5	6
8	(Belgium) Ysaline Bonaventure	3	7	3

Qualifying competition
4	(France) Océane Dodin	6	4	3
(Argentina) Nadia Podoroska	2	6	6
