= 2020 Internazionali Femminili di Palermo – Doubles =

Doubles
- 2020 Internazionali Femminili di Palermo

Final
- Champions: (Netherlands) Arantxa Rus (Slovenia) Tamara Zidanšek
- Runners-up: (Italy) Elisabetta Cocciaretto (Italy) Martina Trevisan
- Score: 7–5, 7–5

Details
- Draw: 16
- Seeds: 4

Events
Singles	Doubles
← 2019 ·	Internazionali Femminili di Palermo	· 2021 →

Cornelia Lister and Renata Voráčová were the defending champions, but they chose not to participate.

Arantxa Rus and Tamara Zidanšek won the title, defeating first-time finalists Elisabetta Cocciaretto and Martina Trevisan in the final, 7–5, 7–5.

== Seeds ==
1. (Spain) Georgina García Pérez / (Spain) Sara Sorribes Tormo (quarterfinals)
2. (Romania) Raluca Olaru / (Ukraine) Dayana Yastremska (first round)
3. (Germany) Laura Siegemund / (Belgium) Yanina Wickmayer (quarterfinals)
4. (Netherlands) Bibiane Schoofs / (Netherlands) Rosalie van der Hoek (semifinals)

== Draw ==
=== Key ===
- Q = Qualifier
- WC = Wild card
- LL = Lucky loser
- Alt = Alternate
- SE = Special exempt
- PR = Protected ranking
- ITF = ITF entry
- JE = Junior exempt
- w/o = Walkover
- r = Retired
- d = Defaulted
- SR = Special ranking

=== Draw ===
First round
1	(Spain) G García Pérez (Spain) S Sorribes Tormo	7	6
(Romania) LI Paar (Germany) J Wachaczyk	5	2
(Russia) V Gracheva (Russia) A Komardina	1	5
(Italy) E Cocciaretto (Italy) M Trevisan	6	7
4	(Netherlands) B Schoofs (Netherlands) R van der Hoek	6	2	[10]
(Romania) I-C Begu (Romania) E-G Ruse	4	6	[5]
(Romania) E Bogdan (Hungary) RL Jani	3	2
(Norway) U Eikeri (France) E Lechemia	6	6
(Germany) V Heisen (United Kingdom) E Webley-Smith	4	4
(Belgium) G Minnen (Belgium) A Van Uytvanck	6	6
WC	(Italy) F Bilardo (Italy) D Spiteri	1	1
3	(Germany) L Siegemund (Belgium) Y Wickmayer	6	6
(Romania) C Dinu (Romania) A Mitu	2	4
(Italy) G Gatto-Monticone (Italy) J Paolini	6	6
(Netherlands) A Rus (Slovenia) T Zidanšek	7	4	[10]
2	(Romania) R Olaru (Ukraine) D Yastremska	5	6	[8]

Quarterfinals
1	(Spain) G García Pérez (Spain) S Sorribes Tormo	3	6	[5]
(Italy) E Cocciaretto (Italy) M Trevisan	6	2	[10]
4	(Netherlands) B Schoofs (Netherlands) R van der Hoek	6	6
(Norway) U Eikeri (France) E Lechemia	4	3
(Belgium) G Minnen (Belgium) A Van Uytvanck	2	7	[10]
3	(Germany) L Siegemund (Belgium) Y Wickmayer	6	5	[6]
(Italy) G Gatto-Monticone (Italy) J Paolini	5	1
(Netherlands) A Rus (Slovenia) T Zidanšek	7	6

Semifinals
(Italy) E Cocciaretto (Italy) M Trevisan	6	6
4	(Netherlands) B Schoofs (Netherlands) R van der Hoek	4	3
(Belgium) G Minnen (Belgium) A Van Uytvanck	6	6^{4}	[11]
(Netherlands) A Rus (Slovenia) T Zidanšek	1	7^{7}	[13]

Final
(Italy) E Cocciaretto (Italy) M Trevisan	5	5
(Netherlands) A Rus (Slovenia) T Zidanšek	7	7
