= 2019 Internazionali Femminili di Palermo – Doubles =

Doubles
- 2019 Internazionali Femminili di Palermo

Final
- Champions: (Sweden) Cornelia Lister (Czech Republic) Renata Voráčová
- Runners-up: (Georgia (country)) Ekaterine Gorgodze (Netherlands) Arantxa Rus
- Score: 7–6^{(7–2)}, 6–2

Details
- Draw: 16
- Seeds: 4

Events
Singles	Doubles
← 2013 ·	Internazionali Femminili di Palermo	· 2020 →

Kristina Mladenovic and Katarzyna Piter were the champions the last time the tournament was held in 2013, but chose not to participate this year.

Cornelia Lister and Renata Voráčová won the title, defeating Ekaterine Gorgodze and Arantxa Rus in the final, 7–6^{(7–2)}, 6–2.

== Seeds ==
1. (Sweden) Cornelia Lister / (Czech Republic) Renata Voráčová (champions)
2. (Spain) Georgina García Pérez / (Hungary) Fanny Stollár (first round)
3. (Australia) Daria Gavrilova / (China) Peng Shuai (semifinals)
4. (Italy) Giorgia Marchetti / (Brazil) Laura Pigossi (first round)

== Draw ==
=== Key ===
- Q = Qualifier
- WC = Wild card
- LL = Lucky loser
- Alt = Alternate
- SE = Special exempt
- PR = Protected ranking
- ITF = ITF entry
- JE = Junior exempt
- w/o = Walkover
- r = Retired
- d = Defaulted
- SR = Special ranking

=== Draw ===
First round
(Italy) J Paolini (Spain) S Sorribes Tormo	4	2
(Spain) L Arruabarrena (Spain) P Badosa	6	6
3	(Australia) D Gavrilova (China) S Peng	6^{3}	6	[10]
(Romania) E Bogdan (Romania) C Dinu	7^{7}	4	[8]
(Italy) M Di Giuseppe (Italy) G Gatto-Monticone
WC	(Italy) E Cocciaretto (Italy) F Rossi	w/o
(Australia) A Bai (Germany) N Geuer	6	3	[10]
(Brazil) G Cé (Brazil) PC Gonçalves	2	6	[4]
(Italy) A Grymalska (Netherlands) R van der Hoek	6	7
4	(Italy) G Marchetti (Brazil) L Pigossi	4	5
(India) P Thombare (Netherlands) E Wacanno	6^{2}	6^{4}
(Georgia (country)) E Gorgodze (Netherlands) A Rus	7^{7}	7^{7}
WC	(Italy) F Bilardo (Italy) D Spiteri	7	2	[10]
2	(Spain) G García Pérez (Hungary) F Stollár	5	6	[8]

Quarterfinals
1	(Sweden) C Lister (Czech Republic) R Voráčová	7	6
(Spain) L Arruabarrena (Spain) P Badosa	5	4
3	(Australia) D Gavrilova (China) S Peng	6^{6}	6	[10]
WC	(Italy) E Cocciaretto (Italy) F Rossi	7^{8}	1	[3]
(Australia) A Bai (Germany) N Geuer	6	4
(Italy) A Grymalska (Netherlands) R van der Hoek	4	1^{r}
(Georgia (country)) E Gorgodze (Netherlands) A Rus	7	6
WC	(Italy) F Bilardo (Italy) D Spiteri	5	1

Semifinals
1	(Sweden) C Lister (Czech Republic) R Voráčová	7^{7}	3	[10]
3	(Australia) D Gavrilova (China) S Peng	6^{5}	6	[6]
(Australia) A Bai (Germany) N Geuer	3	4
(Georgia (country)) E Gorgodze (Netherlands) A Rus	6	6

Final
1	(Sweden) C Lister (Czech Republic) R Voráčová	7^{7}	6
(Georgia (country)) E Gorgodze (Netherlands) A Rus	6^{2}	2
