= 2020 Internazionali Femminili di Palermo =

Women's tennis tournament

- Date: 3–9 August
- Edition: 28th
- Category: International
- Draw: 32S / 16D
- Prize money: $202,250 (€163,103)
- Surface: Clay / outdoor
- Location: Palermo, Italy
- Venue: Country Time Club

Champions

Singles
- (France) Fiona Ferro

Doubles
- (Netherlands) Arantxa Rus / (Slovenia) Tamara Zidanšek
← 2019 ·	Internazionali Femminili di Palermo	· 2021 →

The 2020 Internazionali Femminili di Palermo was a professional women's tennis tournament played on outdoor clay courts at the Country Time Club. It was the 28th edition of the tournament which was part of the 2020 WTA Tour. It took place in Palermo, Italy between 3 and 9 August 2020. This was the first tournament of the 2020 WTA Tour after the suspension due to COVID-19 pandemic. This restrictions have eased to reduce a number of spectators to 350, and limited of photographers and journalists.

== Finals ==
=== Singles ===
- (France) Fiona Ferro defeated (Estonia) Anett Kontaveit, 6–2, 7–5

=== Doubles ===
- (Netherlands) Arantxa Rus / (Slovenia) Tamara Zidanšek defeated (Italy) Elisabetta Cocciaretto / (Italy) Martina Trevisan, 7–5, 7–5

== Points and prize money ==
=== Point distribution ===
Event	W	F	SF	QF	Round of 16	Round of 32	Q	Q3	Q2	Q1
Singles	280	180	110	60	30	1	18	14	10	1
Doubles	280	180	110	60	1	—	—	—	—	—

=== Prize money ===
Event	W	F	SF	QF	Round of 16	Round of 32	Q3	Q2	Q1
Singles	€20,161	€11,290	€6,480	€4,032	€2,540	€1,855	€871	€758	€645
Doubles*	€7,258	€4,032	€2,605	€1,597	€1,226	—	—	—	—

_{*per team}

== Singles main draw entrants ==
=== Seeds ===
Country	Player	Rank^{1}	Seed
CRO	Petra Martić	15	1
CZE	Markéta Vondroušová	18	2
GRE	Maria Sakkari	20	3
EST	Anett Kontaveit	22	4
BEL	Elise Mertens	23	5
CRO	Donna Vekić	24	6
UKR	Dayana Yastremska	25	7
RUS	Ekaterina Alexandrova	27	8

- Rankings are as of March 16, 2020

=== Other entrants ===
The following players received wildcards into the singles main draw:

- (Italy) Elisabetta Cocciaretto
- (Italy) Sara Errani

The following players received entry from the qualifying draw:

- (Slovenia) Kaja Juvan
- (Russia) Liudmila Samsonova
- (Belarus) Aliaksandra Sasnovich
- (Argentina) Nadia Podoroska

The following player received entry as a lucky loser:

- (France) Océane Dodin

=== Withdrawals ===
Before the tournament

- (Russia) Anna Blinkova → replaced by (Italy) Camila Giorgi
- (United Kingdom) Johanna Konta → replaced by (Slovenia) Tamara Zidanšek
- (Russia) Veronika Kudermetova → replaced by (Romania) Sorana Cîrstea
- (Russia) Svetlana Kuznetsova → replaced by (Netherlands) Arantxa Rus
- (Czech Republic) Karolína Muchová → replaced by (Spain) Sara Sorribes Tormo
- (Latvia) Jeļena Ostapenko → replaced by (Romania) Patricia Maria Țig
- (Latvia) Anastasija Sevastova → replaced by (Belgium) Kirsten Flipkens
- (Poland) Iga Świątek → replaced by (Romania) Irina-Camelia Begu

== Doubles main draw entrants ==
=== Seeds ===
Country	Player	Country	Player	Rank^{1}	Seed
ESP	Georgina García Pérez	ESP	Sara Sorribes Tormo	117	1
ROU	Raluca Olaru	UKR	Dayana Yastremska	140	2
GER	Laura Siegemund	BEL	Yanina Wickmayer	158	3
NED	Bibiane Schoofs	NED	Rosalie van der Hoek	215	4

- ^{1} Rankings are as of March 16, 2020

=== Other entrants ===
The following pair received a wildcard into the doubles main draw:

- (Italy) Federica Bilardo / (Italy) Dalila Spiteri
