= 2021 Internazionali Femminili di Palermo =

- Date: 19–25 July
- Edition: 29th
- Category: International
- Draw: 32S / 16D
- Prize money: $235,238
- Surface: Clay / outdoor
- Location: Palermo, Italy
- Venue: Country Time Club

Champions

Singles
- (United States) Danielle Collins

Doubles
- (New Zealand) Erin Routliffe / (Belgium) Kimberley Zimmermann
- Internazionali Femminili di Palermo

The 2021 Internazionali Femminili di Palermo was a professional women's tennis tournament played on outdoor clay courts at the Country Time Club. It was the 29th edition of the tournament and part of the 2021 WTA Tour. It took place in Palermo, Italy between 19 and 25 July 2021. First-seeded Danielle Collins won the singles title.

== Finals ==
=== Singles ===
(United States) Danielle Collins defeated (Romania) Elena-Gabriela Ruse, 6–4, 6–2.

- It was Collins' 1st singles title of the year and of her career.

=== Doubles ===
- (New Zealand) Erin Routliffe / (Belgium) Kimberley Zimmermann defeated (Russia) Natela Dzalamidze / (Russia) Kamilla Rakhimova 7–6^{(7–5)}, 4–6, [10–4]

== Singles main draw entrants ==
=== Seeds ===
Country	Player	Rank^{1}	Seed
USA	Danielle Collins	49	1
RUS	Liudmila Samsonova	55	2
SUI	Jil Teichmann	56	3
CHN	Zhang Shuai	60	4
BUL	Viktoriya Tomova	109	5
FRA	Océane Dodin	116	6
AUS	Astra Sharma	128	7
RUS	Kamilla Rakhimova	132	8

- ^{1} Rankings are as of 12 July 2021.

=== Other entrants ===
The following players received wildcards into the main draw:

- (Italy) Nuria Brancaccio
- (Italy) Lucia Bronzetti
- (Italy) Lucrezia Stefanini
- (China) Zhang Shuai

The following player received entry using a protected ranking:

- (Romania) Alexandra Dulgheru
- (Luxembourg) Mandy Minella

The following players received entry from the qualifying draw:

- (Spain) Marina Bassols Ribera
- (Germany) Katharina Gerlach
- (Romania) Elena-Gabriela Ruse
- (China) Zheng Qinwen

=== Withdrawals ===
Before the tournament

- (Romania) Sorana Cîrstea → replaced by (Switzerland) Leonie Küng
- (Italy) Elisabetta Cocciaretto → replaced by (United States) Grace Min
- (Italy) Sara Errani → replaced by (Spain) Lara Arruabarrena
- (Switzerland) Viktorija Golubic → replaced by (United States) Francesca Di Lorenzo
- (Croatia) Ana Konjuh → replaced by (Romania) Alexandra Dulgheru
- (Italy) Jasmine Paolini → replaced by (Romania) Jaqueline Cristian
- (United States) Bernarda Pera → replaced by (Serbia) Olga Danilović
- (Germany) Andrea Petkovic → replaced by (Russia) Valeria Savinykh
- (Netherlands) Arantxa Rus → replaced by (Russia) Natalia Vikhlyantseva
- (Romania) Patricia Maria Țig → replaced by (Spain) Cristina Bucșa
- (Italy) Martina Trevisan → replaced by (Italy) Giulia Gatto-Monticone
- (Mexico) Renata Zarazúa → replaced by (Russia) Vitalia Diatchenko

During the tournament

- (Switzerland) Jil Teichmann

== Doubles main draw entrants ==
=== Seeds ===
Country	Player	Country	Player	Rank^{1}	Seed
JPN	Eri Hozumi	CHN	Zhang Shuai	181	1
ROU	Andreea Mitu	NED	Rosalie van der Hoek	187	2
GER	Vivian Heisen	AUS	Astra Sharma	235	3
NZL	Erin Routliffe	BEL	Kimberley Zimmermann	278	4

- ^{1} Rankings are as of July 12, 2021.

=== Other entrants ===
The following pairs received wildcards into the doubles main draw:

- (Italy) Matilde Paoletti / (Italy) Lisa Pigato
- (Italy) Camilla Rosatello / (Italy) Dalila Spiteri

=== Withdrawals ===
Before the tournament

- (Australia) Lizette Cabrera / (Australia) Maddison Inglis → replaced by (United Kingdom) Sarah Beth Grey / (United Kingdom) Emily Webley-Smith
- (Hungary) Dalma Gálfi / (United Kingdom) Samantha Murray Sharan → replaced by (Australia) Maddison Inglis / (United Kingdom) Samantha Murray Sharan
- (Indonesia) Beatrice Gumulya / (Chinese Taipei) Hsieh Yu-chieh → replaced by (Spain) Lara Arruabarrena / (Indonesia) Beatrice Gumulya
