= 2021 Internazionali Femminili di Palermo – Singles =

Singles
- 2021 Internazionali Femminili di Palermo

Final
- Champion: (United States) Danielle Collins
- Runner-up: (Romania) Elena-Gabriela Ruse
- Score: 6–4, 6–2

Details
- Draw: 32
- Seeds: 8

Events
Singles	Doubles
← 2020 ·	Internazionali Femminili di Palermo	· 2022 →

Fiona Ferro was the defending champion, but she chose not to participate, as she was competing at the Summer Olympics.

Top seed Danielle Collins won her maiden WTA Tour singles title, defeating Elena-Gabriela Ruse in the final, 6–4, 6–2. Collins did not drop a set during the tournament.

== Seeds ==
1. (United States) Danielle Collins (champion)
2. (Russia) Liudmila Samsonova (first round)
3. (Switzerland) Jil Teichmann (second round, withdrew)
4. (China) Zhang Shuai (semifinals)
5. (Bulgaria) Viktoriya Tomova (first round)
6. (France) Océane Dodin (semifinals)
7. (Australia) Astra Sharma (quarterfinals)
8. (Russia) Kamilla Rakhimova (first round)

== Draw ==
=== Key ===
- Q = Qualifier
- WC = Wild card
- LL = Lucky loser
- Alt = Alternate
- SE = Special exempt
- PR = Protected ranking
- ITF = ITF entry
- JE = Junior exempt
- w/o = Walkover
- r = Retired
- d = Defaulted
- SR = Special ranking

=== Finals ===
Semifinals
1	(United States) Danielle Collins	6	6
4/WC	(China) Zhang Shuai	4	3
Q	(Romania) Elena-Gabriela Ruse	6^{4}	7^{7}	6
6	(France) Océane Dodin	7^{7}	6^{0}	1

Final
1	(United States) Danielle Collins	6	6
Q	(Romania) Elena-Gabriela Ruse	4	2

=== Top half ===
First round
1	(United States) D Collins	7	6
Q	(Germany) K Gerlach	5	3
(Italy) G Gatto-Monticone	2	3
(Australia) M Inglis	6	6
(Switzerland) L Küng	3	2
(Russia) N Vikhlyantseva	6	6
WC	(Italy) L Stefanini	4	6	3
7	(Australia) A Sharma	6	1	6
4/WC	(China) S Zhang	7	6
(Spain) C Bucșa	5	3
(Russia) V Savinykh	5	3
(United States) F Di Lorenzo	7	6
(Ukraine) K Zavatska	6	6
(Australia) L Cabrera	2	3
(Serbia) O Danilović	3	6	6
8	(Russia) K Rakhimova	6	2	2

Second round
1	(United States) D Collins	6	6
(Australia) M Inglis	4	1
(Russia) N Vikhlyantseva	4	5
7	(Australia) A Sharma	6	7
4/WC	(China) S Zhang	6	6
(United States) F Di Lorenzo	1	2
(Ukraine) K Zavatska	6^{4}	5
(Serbia) O Danilović	7^{7}	7

Quarterfinals
1	(United States) D Collins	6	6
7	(Australia) A Sharma	1	4
4/WC	(China) S Zhang	4	6	7^{7}
(Serbia) O Danilović	6	3	6^{2}

Semifinals
1	(United States) D Collins	6	6
4/WC	(China) S Zhang	4	3

=== Bottom half ===
First round
5	(Bulgaria) V Tomova	4	1
WC	(Italy) L Bronzetti	6	6
(Spain) L Arruabarrena	3	4
(United States) G Min	6	6
PR	(Luxembourg) M Minella	3	1
Q	(Romania) E-G Ruse	6	6
Q	(Spain) M Bassols Ribera	6	4	1
3	(Switzerland) J Teichmann	3	6	6
6	(France) O Dodin	6	6
PR	(Romania) A Dulgheru	3	2
(Russia) V Diatchenko	6	7^{7}
(Austria) J Grabher	3	6^{5}
WC	(Italy) N Brancaccio	6	3	4
(Romania) J Cristian	2	6	6
Q	(China) Q Zheng	6	6
2	(Russia) L Samsonova	3	2

Second round
WC	(Italy) L Bronzetti	6	6
(United States) G Min	3	1
Q	(Romania) E-G Ruse	w/o
3	(Switzerland) J Teichmann
6	(France) O Dodin	7^{9}	6
(Russia) V Diatchenko	6^{7}	4
(Romania) J Cristian	6	6
Q	(China) Q Zheng	1	4

Quarterfinals
WC	(Italy) L Bronzetti	4	5
Q	(Romania) E-G Ruse	6	7
6	(France) O Dodin	6^{6}	6	6
(Romania) J Cristian	7^{8}	3	4

Semifinals
Q	(Romania) E-G Ruse	6^{4}	7^{7}	6
6	(France) O Dodin	7^{7}	6^{0}	1

== Qualifying ==
=== Seeds ===
1. (Romania) Elena-Gabriela Ruse (qualified)
2. (China) Zheng Qinwen (qualified)
3. (Greece) Despina Papamichail (qualifying competition)
4. (Italy) Martina Di Giuseppe (qualifying competition)
5. (Germany) Katharina Gerlach (qualified)
6. (United Kingdom) Samantha Murray Sharan (first round)
7. (Spain) Marina Bassols Ribera (qualified)
8. (Italy) Camilla Rosatello (qualifying competition)

=== Qualifiers ===
1. (Romania) Elena-Gabriela Ruse
2. (China) Zheng Qinwen
3. (Germany) Katharina Gerlach
4. (Spain) Marina Bassols Ribera

=== Draw ===
==== First qualifier ====
First round
1	(Romania) Elena-Gabriela Ruse	6	6
(Germany) Jasmin Jebawy	1	3
(United States) Victoria Duval	4	6	5
8	(Italy) Camilla Rosatello	6	4	7

Qualifying competition
1	(Romania) Elena-Gabriela Ruse	6	6
8	(Italy) Camilla Rosatello	1	0

==== Second qualifier ====
First round
2	(China) Zheng Qinwen	6	6
PR	(United States) Louisa Chirico	2	0
WC	(Italy) Melania Delai	2	6	6
6	(United Kingdom) Samantha Murray Sharan	6	3	2

Qualifying competition
2	(China) Zheng Qinwen	6	6
WC	(Italy) Melania Delai	2	1

==== Third qualifier ====
First round
3	(Greece) Despina Papamichail	3	7	6
(Italy) Dalila Spiteri	6	5	2
(Italy) Lisa Pigato	5	6^{5}
5	(Germany) Katharina Gerlach	7	7^{7}

Qualifying competition
3	(Greece) Despina Papamichail	4	6	5
5	(Germany) Katharina Gerlach	6	2	7

==== Fourth qualifier ====
First round
4	(Italy) Martina Di Giuseppe	6	6
(United States) Quinn Gleason	1	3
WC	(Italy) Federica Bilardo	0	1
7	(Spain) Marina Bassols Ribera	6	6

Qualifying competition
4	(Italy) Martina Di Giuseppe	6^{4}	6^{7}
7	(Spain) Marina Bassols Ribera	7^{7}	7^{9}
