= Tatiana Pieri =

Italian tennis player (born 1999)

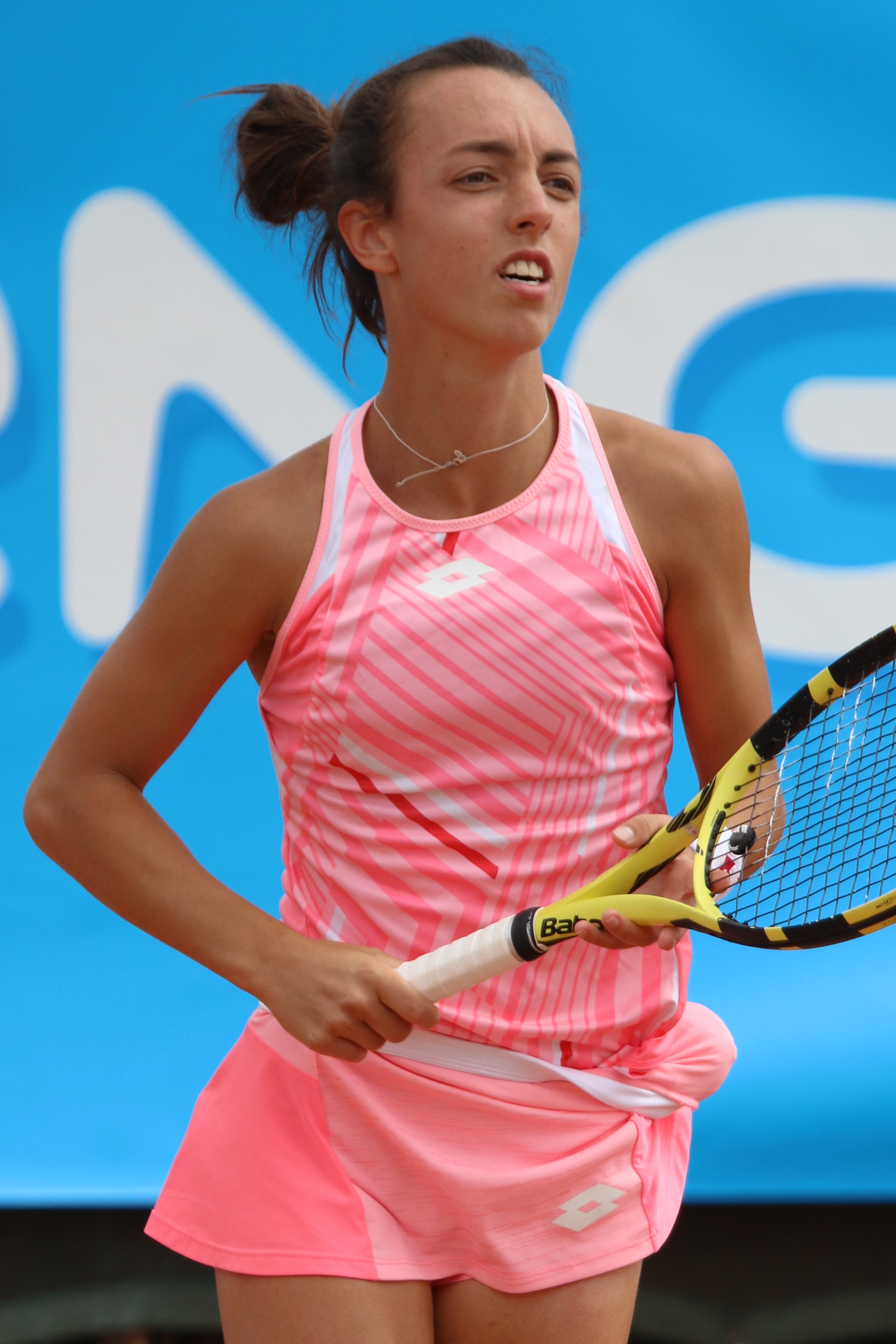
- Pieri at the 2021 Open de Biarritz
- Country (sports): Italy
- Born: 29 March 1999 (age 27)
- Plays: Right-handed
- Prize money: $129,391

Singles
- Career record: 310–257
- Career titles: 3 ITF
- Highest ranking: No. 322 (22 July 2024)
- Current ranking: No. 438 (24 August 2026)

Doubles
- Career record: 83–77
- Career titles: 5 ITF
- Highest ranking: No. 362 (23 September 2019)
- Current ranking: No. 1,083 (24 August 2026)
- Last updated on: 27 August 2026.

Tatiana Pieri (born 29 March 1999) is an Italian tennis player. Pieri has a career-high singles ranking of No. 322 by the WTA, achieved on 22 July 2024. She also has a career-high WTA doubles ranking of No. 362, reached on 23 September 2019.

== Career ==
She is a member of Circolo Tennis Lucca where she is coached by her father Ivano Pieri. As a junior player, she was a winner at the national level, winning the Coppa Lambertenghi and the Italian under-14 title.

She defeated Frenchwoman Harmony Tan to reach the final round of qualifying at the 2025 Grand Prix SAR La Princesse Lalla Meryem in Rabat, where she faced compatriot Nicole Fossa Huergo, winning in straight sets. On her WTA main-draw debut, she then defeated Carlota Martinez Cirez of Spain in straight sets. Pieri lost to Ajla Tomljanovic in the second round.

== Personal life ==
She is from Bagni di Lucca. Her older sister Jessica Pieri is also a professional tennis player.

== ITF Circuit finals ==
=== Singles: 7 (3 titles, 4 runner-ups) ===
Legend
W35 tournaments
W10/15 tournaments

| Result | W–L | Date | Tournament | Tier | Surface | Opponent | Score |
|---|---|---|---|---|---|---|---|
| Loss | 0–1 | Mar 2014 | ITF Santa Margherita di Pula, Italy | W10 | Clay | (Switzerland) Karin Kennel | 2–6, 1–6 |
| Loss | 0–2 | Aug 2016 | ITF Aprilia, Italy | W10 | Clay | (Italy) Maria Marfutina | 4–6, 0–6 |
| Loss | 0–3 | Nov 2019 | ITF Solarino, Italy | W15 | Carpet | (Switzerland) Bojana Klincov | 6–3, 4–6, 3–6 |
| Win | 1–3 | Jun 2021 | ITF L'Aquila, Italy | W15 | Clay | (Germany) Anne Schäfer | 2–6, 6–3, 7–5 |
| Loss | 1–4 | Aug 2022 | ITF Pescara, Italy | W15 | Clay | (Italy) Anastasia Grymalska | 3–6, 6–3, 3–6 |
| Win | 2–4 | May 2024 | ITF Villach, Austria | W35 | Clay | (Ukraine) Valeriya Strakhova | 6–4, 7–5 |
| Win | 3–4 | Aug 2025 | ITF Bydgoszcz, Poland | W35 | Clay | (Sweden) Kajsa Rinaldo Persson | 6–2, 6–3 |

=== Doubles: 9 (5 titles, 4 runner-ups) ===
Legend
W25/35 tournaments
W10/15 tournaments

| Result | W–L | Date | Tournament | Tier | Surface | Partner | Opponents | Score |
|---|---|---|---|---|---|---|---|---|
| Loss | 0–1 | Jun 2016 | ITF Sassuolo, Italy | W10 | Clay | (Italy) Lucrezia Stefanini | (Italy) Alice Balducci (Italy) Deborah Chiesa | 4–6, 2–6 |
| Win | 1–1 | Sep 2016 | ITF Santa Margherita di Pula, Italy | W10 | Clay | (Italy) Lucrezia Stefanini | (Italy) Alice Balducci (Italy) Marcella Cucca | 6–4, 6–0 |
| Win | 2–1 | Oct 2016 | ITF Santa Margherita di Pula | W10 | Clay | (Italy) Federica Bilardo | (Switzerland) Ylena In-Albon (Italy) Giorgia Marchetti | 6–4, 7–5 |
| Win | 3–1 | May 2017 | ITF Bergamo, Italy | W15 | Clay | (Italy) Lucrezia Stefanini | (Italy) Martina Colmegna (Switzerland) Ylena In-Albon | 3–6, 6–3, [10–6] |
| Loss | 3–2 | Sep 2018 | ITF Santa Margherita di Pula | W25 | Clay | (Italy) Deborah Chiesa | (Italy) Federica di Sarra (Italy) Anastasia Grymalska | 6–7^{(3)}, 2–6 |
| Win | 4–2 | Sep 2018 | ITF Aschaffenburg, Germany | W25 | Clay | (Australia) Ivana Popovic | (Spain) Irene Burillo (Greece) Despina Papamichail | 7–6^{(5)}, 6–4 |
| Win | 5–2 | Feb 2020 | ITF Heraklion, Greece | W15 | Clay | (Italy) Dalila Spiteri | (Italy) Nuria Brancaccio (Denmark) Olga Helmi | 7–6^{(3)}, 6–1 |
| Loss | 5–3 | Mar 2022 | ITF Amiens, France | W15+H | Clay | (Italy) Federica Rossi | (France) Océane Babel (France) Lucie Nguyen Tan | 3–6, 4–6 |
| Loss | 5–4 | Apr 2025 | ITF Santa Margherita di Pula | W35 | Clay | (Italy) Jessica Pieri | (Japan) Hikaru Sato (Japan) Ikumi Yamazaki | 5–7, 6–2, [4–10] |
