= 2019 Internazionali Femminili di Palermo =

- Date: 22–28 July
- Edition: 27th
- Draw: 32S / 15D
- Surface: Clay / outdoor
- Location: Palermo, Italy
- Venue: Country Time Club

Champions

Singles
- (Switzerland) Jil Teichmann

Doubles
- (Sweden) Cornelia Lister / (Czech Republic) Renata Voráčová
← 2013 ·	Internazionali Femminili di Palermo	· 2020 →

The 2019 Internazionali Femminili di Palermo was a professional women's tennis tournament played on outdoor clay courts at the Country Time Club. It was the 27th edition of the tournament which was part of the 2019 WTA Tour. It took place in Palermo, Italy between 22 and 28 July 2019. The tournament made a return to the WTA Tour after a five-year absence (2014–2018).

== Finals ==
=== Singles ===
- (Switzerland) Jil Teichmann defeated (Netherlands) Kiki Bertens, 7–6^{(7–3)}, 6–2

=== Doubles ===
- (Sweden) Cornelia Lister / (Czech Republic) Renata Voráčová defeated (Georgia (country)) Ekaterine Gorgodze / (Netherlands) Arantxa Rus, 7–6^{(7–2)}, 6–2

== Singles main draw entrants ==
=== Seeds ===
Country	Player	Rank^{1}	Seed
NED	Kiki Bertens	5	1
FRA	Alizé Cornet	48	2
SVK	Viktória Kužmová	54	3
SLO	Tamara Zidanšek	57	4
FRA	Pauline Parmentier	75	5
GER	Laura Siegemund	77	6
SPA	Sara Sorribes Tormo	87	7
SUI	Jil Teichmann	90	8

- Rankings are as of July 15, 2019

=== Other entrants ===
The following players received wildcards into the singles main draw:

- (Italy) Sara Errani
- (Italy) Giulia Gatto-Monticone
- (Italy) Martina Trevisan

The following player received entry using a protected ranking into the main draw:

- (Germany) Anna-Lena Friedsam

The following player received entry as a special exempt into the main draw:

- ~~(Italy) Martina Di Giuseppe~~

The following players received entry from the qualifying draw:

- (Brazil) Gabriela Cé
- (Italy) Elisabetta Cocciaretto
- (Australia) Jaimee Fourlis
- (France) Amandine Hesse
- (Croatia) Tereza Mrdeža
- (Italy) Jessica Pieri

The following players received entry as lucky losers:

- (Spain) Georgina García Pérez
- (Russia) Liudmila Samsonova
- (Hungary) Fanny Stollár

=== Withdrawals ===
Before the tournament

- (Switzerland) Timea Bacsinszky → replaced by (Russia) Liudmila Samsonova
- (Germany) Mona Barthel → replaced by (Netherlands) Arantxa Rus
- (Spain) Aliona Bolsova → replaced by (Germany) Antonia Lottner
- (Italy) Martina Di Giuseppe → replaced by (Hungary) Fanny Stollár
- (Germany) Julia Görges → replaced by (Romania) Irina-Camelia Begu
- (Slovenia) Polona Hercog → replaced by (Spain) Lara Arruabarrena
- (Luxembourg) Mandy Minella → replaced by (Spain) Georgina García Pérez
- (Czech Republic) Karolína Muchová → replaced by (Spain) Paula Badosa
- (Slovakia) Anna Karolína Schmiedlová → replaced by (Switzerland) Stefanie Vögele
- (China) Zhang Shuai → replaced by (Georgia (country)) Ekaterine Gorgodze

=== Retirements ===
- (Germany) Antonia Lottner (gastrointestinal illness)

== Doubles main draw entrants ==
=== Seeds ===
Country	Player	Country	Player	Rank^{1}	Seed
SWE	Cornelia Lister	CZE	Renata Voráčová	170	1
ESP	Georgina García Pérez	HUN	Fanny Stollár	204	2
AUS	Daria Gavrilova	CHN	Peng Shuai	239	3
ITA	Giorgia Marchetti	BRA	Laura Pigossi	316	4

- ^{1} Rankings are as of July 15, 2019

=== Other entrants ===
The following pairs received wildcards into the doubles main draw:

- (Italy) Federica Bilardo / (Italy) Dalila Spiteri
- (Italy) Elisabetta Cocciaretto / (Italy) Federica Rossi

=== Withdrawals ===
Before the tournament

- (Italy) Martina Di Giuseppe (viral illness)

=== Retirements ===
During the tournament

- (Netherlands) Rosalie van der Hoek (gastrointestinal illness)
