= 2021 Internazionali Femminili di Palermo – Doubles =

Doubles
- 2021 Internazionali Femminili di Palermo

Final
- Champions: (New Zealand) Erin Routliffe (Belgium) Kimberley Zimmermann
- Runners-up: (Russia) Natela Dzalamidze (Russia) Kamilla Rakhimova
- Score: 7–6^{(7–5)}, 4–6, [10–4]

Events
Singles	Doubles
- Internazionali Femminili di Palermo

Arantxa Rus and Tamara Zidanšek were the reigning champions, but chose not to participate.

Erin Routliffe and Kimberley Zimmermann won the title, defeating Natela Dzalamidze and Kamilla Rakhimova in the final, 7–6^{(7–5)}, 4–6, [10–4].

== Seeds ==
1. (Japan) Eri Hozumi / (China) Zhang Shuai (semifinals, withdrew)
2. (Romania) Andreea Mitu / (Netherlands) Rosalie van der Hoek (quarterfinals)
3. (Germany) Vivian Heisen / (Australia) Astra Sharma (first round)
4. (New Zealand) Erin Routliffe / (Belgium) Kimberley Zimmermann (champions)

== Draw ==
Key

- Q = Qualifier
- WC = Wild card
- LL = Lucky loser
- Alt = Alternate
- ITF = ITF entry
- PR = Protected ranking
- SR = Special ranking
- SE = Special exempt
- JE = Junior exempt
- JR = Junior Accelerator Programme entrant
- CO = College Accelerator Programme entrant
- NG = Next Gen Accelerator Program entrant
- w/o = Walkover
- r = Retired
- d = Defaulted

=== Draw ===
First round
1	(Japan) E Hozumi (China) S Zhang	6	7
(United States) E Bektas (United Kingdom) T Moore	3	5
WC	(Italy) M Paoletti (Italy) L Pigato	0	6	[10]
(United States) Q Gleason (Indonesia) J Rompies	6	3	[8]
3	(Germany) V Heisen (Australia) A Sharma	5	7^{8}	[5]
(Russia) N Dzalamidze (Russia) K Rakhimova	7	6^{6}	[10]
(Spain) C Bucșa (Russia) Y Sizikova	6	6
(United Kingdom) SB Grey (United Kingdom) E Webley-Smith	0	0
(Australia) M Inglis (United Kingdom) S Murray Sharan	2	7^{7}	[6]
(Serbia) O Danilović (Romania) E-G Ruse	6	6^{4}	[10]
(Spain) M Bassols Ribera (Greece) D Papamichail	4	3
4	(New Zealand) E Routliffe (Belgium) K Zimmermann	6	6
WC	(Italy) C Rosatello (Italy) D Spiteri	2	1
(Russia) A Panova (Germany) J Wachaczyk	6	6
(Spain) L Arruabarrena (Indonesia) B Gumulya	6	4	[7]
2	(Romania) A Mitu (Netherlands) R van der Hoek	4	6	[10]

Quarterfinals
1	(Japan) E Hozumi (China) S Zhang	4	6	[10]
WC	(Italy) M Paoletti (Italy) L Pigato	6	2	[7]
(Russia) N Dzalamidze (Russia) K Rakhimova	4	6	[10]
(Spain) C Bucșa (Russia) Y Sizikova	6	3	[7]
(Serbia) O Danilović (Romania) E-G Ruse	7	4	[5]
4	(New Zealand) E Routliffe (Belgium) K Zimmermann	5	6	[10]
(Russia) A Panova (Germany) J Wachaczyk	6	5	[10]
2	(Romania) A Mitu (Netherlands) R van der Hoek	1	7	[4]

Semifinals
1	(Japan) E Hozumi (China) S Zhang
(Russia) N Dzalamidze (Russia) K Rakhimova	w/o
4	(New Zealand) E Routliffe (Belgium) K Zimmermann	6	6
(Russia) A Panova (Germany) J Wachaczyk	2	4

Final
(Russia) N Dzalamidze (Russia) K Rakhimova	6^{5}	6	[4]
4	(New Zealand) E Routliffe (Belgium) K Zimmermann	7^{7}	4	[10]
