= Danielle Collins career statistics =

Career finals
Discipline	Type	Won	Lost	Total	WR
Singles	Grand Slam	0	1	1	0.00
Singles	WTA Finals	–	–	–	–
Singles	WTA 1000	1	–	1	1.00
Singles	WTA Tour	3	1	4	0.75
Singles	Olympics	–	–	–	–
Singles	Total	4	2	6	0.67
Doubles	Grand Slam	–	–	–	–
Doubles	WTA Finals	–	–	–	–
Doubles	WTA 1000	–	–	–	–
Doubles	WTA Tour	1	1	2	0.50
Doubles	Olympics	–	–	–	–
Doubles	Total	1	1	2	0.50

This is a list of the main career statistics of professional American tennis player Danielle Collins.

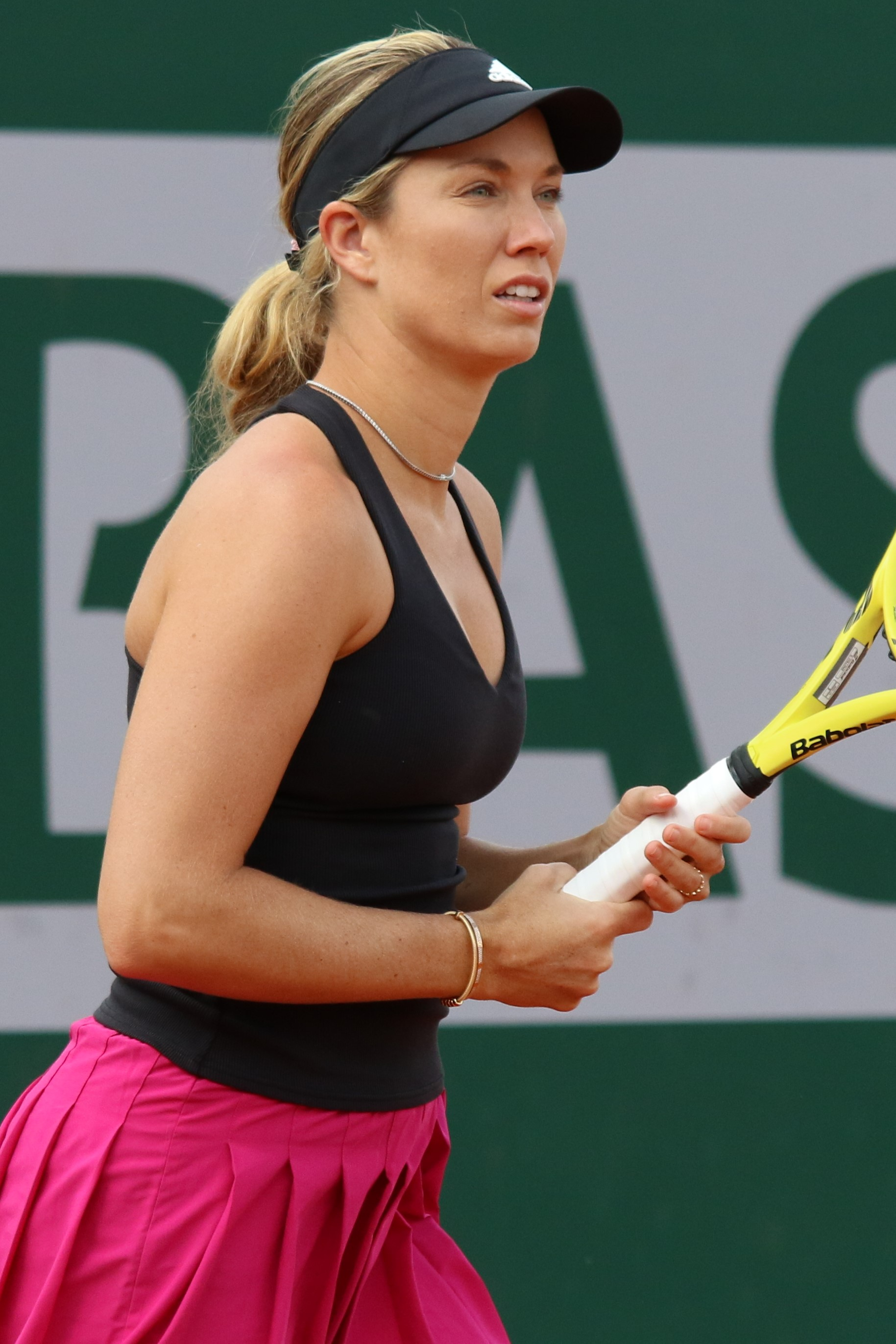
Danielle Collins at the 2022 French Open.

== Performance timelines ==
Key
W	F	SF	QF	#R	RR	Q#	P#	DNQ	A	Z#	PO	G	S	B	NMS	NTI	P	NH

(W) winner; (F) finalist; (SF) semifinalist; (QF) quarterfinalist; (#R) rounds 4, 3, 2, 1; (RR) round-robin stage; (Q#) qualification round; (P#) preliminary round; (DNQ) did not qualify; (A) absent; (Z#) Davis/Fed Cup Zonal Group (with number indication) or (PO) play-off; (G) gold, (S) silver or (B) bronze Olympic/Paralympic medal; (NMS) not a Masters tournament; (NTI) not a Tier I tournament; (P) postponed; (NH) not held; (SR) strike rate (events won / competed); (W–L) win–loss record.
To avoid confusion and double counting, these charts are updated at the conclusion of a tournament or when the player's participation has ended.

Only main-draw results in WTA Tour, Grand Slam tournaments, Billie Jean King Cup and Olympic Games are included in win–loss records.

=== Singles ===
Current through the 2025 Cincinnati Open.

Tournament	2014	2015	2016	2017	2018	2019	2020	2021	2022	2023	2024	2025	SR	W–L	Win %
Grand Slam tournaments
Australian Open	A	A	A	A	Q3	SF	2R	2R	F	3R	2R	3R	0 / 7	18–7	72%
French Open	A	A	A	A	1R	2R	QF	3R	2R	1R	2R	2R	0 / 8	10–8	56%
Wimbledon	A	A	A	Q1	1R	3R	NH	2R	1R	2R	4R	3R	0 / 7	9–7	56%
US Open	1R	A	1R	Q1	1R	2R	1R	3R	4R	2R	1R		0 / 9	7–9	44%
Win–loss	0–1	0–0	0–1	0–0	0–3	9–4	5–3	6–4	10–4	4–4	5–4	5–3	0 / 31	44–31	59%
National representation
Summer Olympics	NH		A	NH				A	NH		QF	NH	0 / 1	3–1	75%
BJK Cup (Note: Formerly known as Fed Cup until 2020.)	A	A	A	A	A	1R	SF (Note: Edition split into the two years due to COVID-19.)		RR	RR	1R		0 / 5	7–2	78%
WTA 1000 tournaments
Qatar Open	A	NTI	A	NTI	A	NTI	A	NTI	A	NTI	QF	A	0 / 1	3–1	75%
Dubai Open	NTI	A	NTI	A	NTI	A	NTI	A	NTI	1R	A	A	0 / 1	0–1	0%
Indian Wells Open	A	A	A	1R	4R	3R	NH	3R	A	1R	2R	3R	0 / 6	6–6	50%
Miami Open	A	A	A	A	SF	3R	NH	2R	QF	3R	W	4R	1 / 7	20–6	77%
Madrid Open	A	A	A	A	1R	2R	NH	A	2R	A	4R	A	0 / 4	4–4	50%
Italian Open	A	A	A	A	2R	2R	A	A	3R	A	SF	4R	0 / 5	9–5	64%
Canadian Open	A	A	A	A	A	1R	NH	3R	A	QF	A	2R	0 / 4	6–4	60%
Cincinnati Open	A	A	A	A	1R	A	1R	1R	A	2R	A	1R	0 / 5	1–5	17%
Wuhan Open	A	A	A	A	1R	2R	NH				A		0 / 2	1–2	33%
China Open	A	A	A	A	2R	1R	NH			A	A		0 / 2	1–2	33%
Guadalajara Open	NH								3R	1R	NTI		0 / 2	2–2	50%
Win–loss	0–0	0–0	0–0	0–1	10–7	5–7	0–1	4–4	7–4	5–6	17–4	6–5	1 / 40	54–39	58%
Career statistics
	2014	2015	2016	2017	2018	2019	2020	2021	2022	2023	2024	2025	SR	W–L	Win %
Tournaments	1	0	1	1	17	18	6	17	11	18	18	13	Career total: 121		
Titles	0	0	0	0	0	0	0	2	0	0	2	0	Career total: 4		
Finals	0	0	0	0	0	0	0	2	1	0	3	0	Career total: 6		
Hard win–loss	0–1	0–0	0–1	0–1	13–10	11–11	6–5	28–11	18–7	19–15	16–11	6–7	2 / 80	117–80	59%
Clay win–loss	0–0	0–0	0–0	0–0	2–4	6–5	4–1	11–3	3–4	0–2	19–5	7–4	2 / 30	52–28	65%
Grass win–loss	0–0	0–0	0–0	0–0	2–3	2–2	0–0	1–1	0–1	1–1	3–1	2–2	0 / 11	11–11	50%
Overall win–loss	0–1	0–0	0–1	0–1	17–17	19–18	10–6	40–15	21–12	20–18	38–17	15–13	4 / 121	180–119	60%
Win (%)	0%	–	0%	0%	50%	51%	63%	73%	64%	53%	69%	54%	Career total: 60%		
Year–end ranking (Note: WTA ranking 2011: 608, 2012–13: N/A)	950	N/A	299	167	36	31	45	29	14	55	11		$9,892,690		

=== Doubles ===
Current through the 2025 Miami Open.

Tournament	2018	2019	2020	2021	2022	2023	2024	2025	SR	W–L	Win%
Grand Slam tournaments
Australian Open	A	1R	2R (Note: Withdrew before second-round match. Not counted as a loss.)	A	3R	1R	1R	1R	0 / 6	3–5	38%
French Open	A	2R	A	1R	1R	1R	A	A	0 / 4	1–4	20%
Wimbledon	1R	QF	NH	A	SF	1R	A	A	0 / 4	6–4	60%
US Open	2R	3R	A	A	A	2R	A		0 / 3	4–3	57%
Win–loss	1–2	5–4	1–0	0–1	6–3	1–4	0–1	0–1	0 / 17	14–16	47%
National representation
Summer Olympics	NH			A	NH		2R	NH	0 / 1	1–1	50%
WTA 1000 tournaments
Indian Wells Open	A	A	NH	A	A	2R	A	1R	0 / 2	1–2	33%
Miami Open	A	1R	NH	A	A	A	A	2R	0 / 2	1–2	33%
Madrid Open	A	A	NH	A	1R	A	A	A	0 / 1	0–1	0%
Italian Open	A	A	A	A	1R	A	A	A	0 / 1	0–1	0%
Win–loss	0–0	0–1	0–0	0–0	0–2	1–1	0–0	1–2	0 / 6	2–6	25%
Career statistics
Tournaments	3	5	2	1	5	8	4	3	Career total: 31		
Titles	0	0	0	0	0	1	0	0	Career total: 1		
Finals	0	0	0	0	0	2	0	0	Career total: 2		
Overall win–loss	1–3	5–6	1–1	0–1	6–5	9–8	3–4	1–3	1 / 31	26–31	46%
Year–end ranking	410	102	96	488	287	84	527				

== Grand Slam tournament finals ==
=== Singles: 1 (runner-up) ===
Result	Year	Tournament	Surface	Opponent	Score
Loss	2022	Australian Open	Hard	(Australia) Ashleigh Barty	3–6, 6–7^{(2–7)}

== WTA 1000 tournaments ==
=== Singles: 1 (title) ===
Result	Year	Tournament	Surface	Opponent	Score
Win	2024	Miami Open	Hard	(Kazakhstan) Elena Rybakina	7–5, 6–3

== WTA Tour finals ==
=== Singles: 6 (4 titles, 2 runner-ups) ===
Legend Grand Slam (0–1) WTA 1000 (1–0) WTA 500 (2–1) WTA 250 (1–0)	Finals by surface Hard (2–1) Clay (2–1)	Finals by setting Outdoor (4–2) Indoor (0–0)

Result	W–L	Date	Tournament	Tier	Surface	Opponent	Score
Win	1–0	Jul 2021	Palermo Ladies Open, Italy	WTA 250	Clay	(Romania) Elena-Gabriela Ruse	6–4, 6–2
Win	2–0	Aug 2021	Silicon Valley Classic, United States	WTA 500	Hard	(Russia) Daria Kasatkina	6–3, 6–7^{(10–12)}, 6–1
Loss	2–1	Jan 2022	Australian Open, Australia	Grand Slam	Hard	(Australia) Ashleigh Barty	3–6, 6–7^{(2–7)}
Win	3–1	Mar 2024	Miami Open, United States	WTA 1000	Hard	(Kazakhstan) Elena Rybakina	7–5, 6–3
Win	4–1	Apr 2024	Charleston Open, United States	WTA 500	Clay	Daria Kasatkina	6–2, 6–1
Loss	4–2	May 2024	Internationaux de Strasbourg, France	WTA 500	Clay	(United States) Madison Keys	1–6, 2–6

=== Doubles: 2 (1 title, 1 runner-up) ===
Legend Grand Slam WTA 1000 WTA 500 (1–1) WTA 250	Finals by surface Hard (0–1) Clay (1–0)	Finals by setting Outdoor (1–1) Indoor (0–0)

Result	W–L	Date	Tournament	Tier	Surface	Partner	Opponents	Score
Win	1–0	Apr 2023	Charleston Open, United States	WTA 500	Clay	(United States) Desirae Krawczyk	(Mexico) Giuliana Olmos (Japan) Ena Shibahara	0–6, 6–4, [14–12]
Loss	1–1	Sep 2023	San Diego Open, United States	WTA 500	Hard	(United States) CoCo Vandeweghe	(Czech Republic) Barbora Krejčíková (Czech Republic) Kateřina Siniaková	1–6, 4–6

== WTA Challenger finals ==
=== Singles: 1 (title) ===
Result	W–L	Date	Tournament	Surface	Opponent	Score
Win	1–0	Jan 2018	Newport Beach Challenger, United States	Hard	(Russia) Sofya Zhuk	2–6, 6–4, 6–3

== ITF Circuit finals ==
=== Singles: 8 (4 titles, 4 runner-ups) ===
Legend $80,000 tournaments (0–1) $60,000 tournaments (0–2) $25,000 tournaments (3–1) $10,000 tournaments (1–0)	Finals by surface Hard (2–2) Clay (2–2)

Result	W–L	Date	Tournament	Tier	Surface	Opponent	Score
Win	1–0	Oct 2011	ITF Williamsburg, United States	10,000	Clay	(Russia) Nika Kukharchuk	6–1, 6–3
Win	2–0	Oct 2016	ITF Stillwater, United States	25,000	Hard	(United States) Caroline Dolehide	1–0 ret.
Loss	2–1	Oct 2016	Classic of Macon, United States	60,000	Hard	(United States) Kayla Day	1–6, 3–6
Loss	2–2	May 2017	ITF Charleston Pro, United States	60,000	Clay	(United States) Madison Brengle	6–4, 2–6, 3–6
Loss	2–3	May 2017	ITF Naples, United States	25,000	Clay	(United States) Claire Liu	3–6, 1–6
Win	3–3	Jun 2017	ITF Bethany Beach, United States	25,000	Clay	(United States) Lauren Embree	6–1, 6–0
Loss	3–4	Nov 2017	Tyler Pro Classic, United States	80,000	Hard	(United States) Kristie Ahn	4–6, 4–6
Win	4–4	Nov 2017	ITF Norman, United States	25,000	Hard	(United States) Sachia Vickery	1–6, 6–3, 6–4

=== Doubles: 2 (2 runner-ups) ===
Legend $60,000 tournaments (0–1) $25,000 tournaments (0–1)	Finals by surface Hard (0–0) Clay (0–2)

Result	W–L	Date	Tournament	Tier	Surface	Partner	Opponents	Score
Loss	0–1	Apr 2017	Charlottesville Open, United States	60,000	Clay	(United States) Madison Brengle	(Serbia) Jovana Jakšić (Argentina) Catalina Pella	4–6, 6–7^{(5–7)}
Loss	0–2	May 2017	ITF Naples, United States	25,000	Clay	(United States) Taylor Townsend	(United States) Emina Bektas (United States) Sanaz Marand	6–7^{(1–7)}, 1–6

== WTA Tour career earnings ==
Current through the 2024 Wimbledon Championships.

Year	Grand Slam singles titles	WTA singles titles	Total singles titles	Earnings ($)	Money list rank
2014	0	0	0	35,828	264
2015	DNP				
2016	0	0	0	54,860	235
2017	0	0	0	60,788	250
2018	0	0	0	819,625	48
2019	0	0	0	1,397,427	28
2020	0	0	0	571,319	30
2021	0	2	2	797,798	40
2022	0	0	0	2,094,550	12
2023	0	0	0	856,429	48
2024	0	2	2	2,225,473	7
Career	0	4	4	8,927,346	79

== Career Grand Slam statistics ==
=== Seedings ===
The tournaments won by Collins are in boldface, and advanced into finals by Collins are in italics.

Year	Australian Open	French Open	Wimbledon	US Open
2014	absent	absent	absent	wildcard
2015	absent	absent	absent	absent
2016	absent	absent	absent	wildcard
2017	absent	absent	did not qualify	did not qualify
2018	did not qualify	not seeded	not seeded	not seeded
2019	not seeded	not seeded	not seeded	not seeded
2020	26th	not seeded	cancelled	not seeded
2021	not seeded	not seeded	not seeded	26th
2022	27th (1)	9th	7th	19th
2023	13th	not seeded	not seeded	not seeded
2024	not seeded	11th	11th	11th

=== Best Grand Slam results details ===
Grand Slam winners are in boldface, and runners-up are in italics.

**Australian Open**
**2022 Australian Open (27th)**
Round	Opponent	Rank	Score
1R	(United States) Caroline Dolehide (Q)	200	6–1, 6–3
2R	(Croatia) Ana Konjuh	58	6–4, 6–3
3R	(Denmark) Clara Tauson	39	4–6, 6–4, 7–5
4R	(Belgium) Elise Mertens (19)	26	4–6, 6–4, 6–4
QF	(France) Alizé Cornet	61	7–5, 6–1
SF	(Poland) Iga Świątek (7)	9	6–4, 6–1
F	**(Australia) Ashleigh Barty (1)**	1	3–6, 6–7^{(2–7)}

**Wimbledon**
**2024 Wimbledon (11th)**
Round	Opponent	Rank	Score
1R	(Denmark) Clara Tauson	66	6–3, 7–6^{(7–4)}
2R	(Hungary) Dalma Gálfi (Q)	127	6–3, 6–4
3R	(Brazil) Beatriz Haddad Maia (20)	20	6–4, 6–4
4R	**(Czech Republic) Barbora Krejčíková (31)**	32	5–7, 3–6

**French Open**
**2020 French Open (unseeded)**
Round	Opponent	Rank	Score
1R	(Romania) Monica Niculescu (Q)	141	2–6, 6–2, 6–1
2R	(Denmark) Clara Tauson	188	6–2, 6–3
3R	(Spain) Garbiñe Muguruza (11)	15	7–5, 2–6, 6–4
4R	(Tunisia) Ons Jabeur (30)	35	6–4, 4–6, 6–4
QF	(United States) Sofia Kenin (4)	6	4–6, 6–4, 0–6

**US Open**
**2022 US Open (19th)**
Round	Opponent	Rank	Score
1R	(Japan) Naomi Osaka	44	7–6^{(7–5)}, 6–3
2R	(Spain) Cristina Bucșa (Q)	118	6–2, 7–5
3R	(France) Alizé Cornet	40	6–4, 7–6^{(11–9)}
4R	Aryna Sabalenka (6)	6	6–3, 3–6, 2–6

== Wins over top 10 players ==
Collins has a 16–33 win-loss record against players who were, at the time the match was played, ranked in the top 10.

Season	2018	2019	2020	2021	2022	2023	2024	2025	Total
Wins	1	1	2	2	4	2	3	1	16

#	Player	Rk	Event	Surface	Rd	Score	Rk	Ref
2018
1.	(United States) Venus Williams	8	Miami Open, United States	Hard	QF	6–2, 6–3	93	
2019
2.	(Germany) Angelique Kerber	2	Australian Open, Australia	Hard	4R	6–0, 6–2	35	
2020
3.	(Ukraine) Elina Svitolina	5	Brisbane International, Australia	Hard	1R	6–1, 6–1	27	
4.	(Switzerland) Belinda Bencic	7	Adelaide International, Australia	Hard	QF	6–3, 6–1	27	
2021
5.	(Czech Republic) Karolína Plíšková	6	Yarra Valley Classic, Australia	Hard	3R	7–6^{(7–5)}, 7–6^{(7–3)}	46	
6.	(Australia) Ashleigh Barty	1	Adelaide International, Australia	Hard	2R	6–3, 6–4	37	
2022
7.	(Poland) Iga Świątek	9	Australian Open, Australia	Hard	SF	6–4, 6–1	30	
8.	(Tunisia) Ons Jabeur	10	Miami Open, United States	Hard	4R	6–2, 6–4	11	
9.	(France) Caroline Garcia	10	Southern California Open, United States	Hard	1R	6–2, 7–6^{(7–4)}	19	
10.	(Spain) Paula Badosa	4	Southern California Open, United States	Hard	QF	7–6^{(7–5)}, 6–4	19	
2023
11.	(Greece) Maria Sakkari	8	Canadian Open, Canada	Hard	2R	6–4, 6–2	48	
12.	(France) Caroline Garcia	10	Southern California Open, United States	Hard	QF	6–2, 6–3	43	
2024
13.	(Kazakhstan) Elena Rybakina	4	Miami Open, United States	Hard	F	7–5, 6–3	53	
14.	(Tunisia) Ons Jabeur	6	Charleston Open, United States	Clay	2R	6–3, 1–6, 6–3	22	
15.	(Greece) Maria Sakkari	7	Charleston Open, United States	Clay	SF	6–3, 6–3	22	
2025
16.	(Poland) Iga Świątek	2	Italian Open, Italy	Clay	3R	6–1, 7–5	35	

- Key: (Rk) first use, opponent rank; (Rd) round; (Rk) 2nd use, player rank; (Ref) reference; (F) final; (SF) semifinal; (QF) quarterfinal; (#R) rounds 4, 3, 2, 1; (RR) round-robin stage; (Q#) qualifying rounds or stages (3), 2, 1.

== Longest winning streak ==
=== 15-match win streak (2024) ===
#	Tournament	Category	Start date	Surface	Rd	Opponent	Rank	Score
–	Indian Wells Open	WTA 1000	March 6, 2024	Hard	2R	(Poland) Iga Świątek (1)	1	3–6, 0–6
1	Miami Open	WTA 1000	March 19, 2024	Hard	1R	(United States) Bernarda Pera (LL)	81	3–6, 6–1, 6–1
2	Miami Open	WTA 1000	March 19, 2024	Hard	2R	Anastasia Potapova (30)	29	6–2, 6–2
3	Miami Open	WTA 1000	March 19, 2024	Hard	3R	Elina Avanesyan	65	6–1, 6–2
4	Miami Open	WTA 1000	March 19, 2024	Hard	4R	(Romania) Sorana Cîrstea (19)	24	6–3, 6–2
5	Miami Open	WTA 1000	March 19, 2024	Hard	QF	(France) Caroline Garcia (23)	27	6–3, 6–2
6	Miami Open	WTA 1000	March 19, 2024	Hard	SF	Ekaterina Alexandrova (14)	16	6–3, 6–2
7	Miami Open	WTA 1000	March 19, 2024	Hard	F	(Kazakhstan) Elena Rybakina (4)	4	7–5, 6–3
8	Charleston Open	WTA 500	April 1, 2024	Clay	1R	(Spain) Paula Badosa	82	6–1, 6–4
9	Charleston Open	WTA 500	April 1, 2024	Clay	2R	(Tunisia) Ons Jabeur (2)	6	6–3, 1–6, 6–3
10	Charleston Open	WTA 500	April 1, 2024	Clay	3R	(United States) Sloane Stephens	40	6–2, 6–2
11	Charleston Open	WTA 500	April 1, 2024	Clay	QF	(Belgium) Elise Mertens (11)	30	6–3, 6–4
12	Charleston Open	WTA 500	April 1, 2024	Clay	SF	(Greece) Maria Sakkari (3)	7	6–3, 6–3
13	Charleston Open	WTA 500	April 1, 2024	Clay	F	Daria Kasatkina (4)	11	6–2, 6–1
14	Madrid Open	WTA 1000	April 23, 2024	Clay	2R	(Serbia) Olga Danilović (Q)	122	4–6, 6–4, 7–6^{(10–8)}
15	Madrid Open	WTA 1000	April 23, 2024	Clay	3R	(Romania) Jaqueline Cristian (Q)	73	3–6, 6–4, 6–1
–	Madrid Open	WTA 1000	April 23, 2024	Clay	4R	Aryna Sabalenka (2)	2	6–4, 4–6, 3–6
