= Jessica Pieri =

Italian tennis player (born 1997)

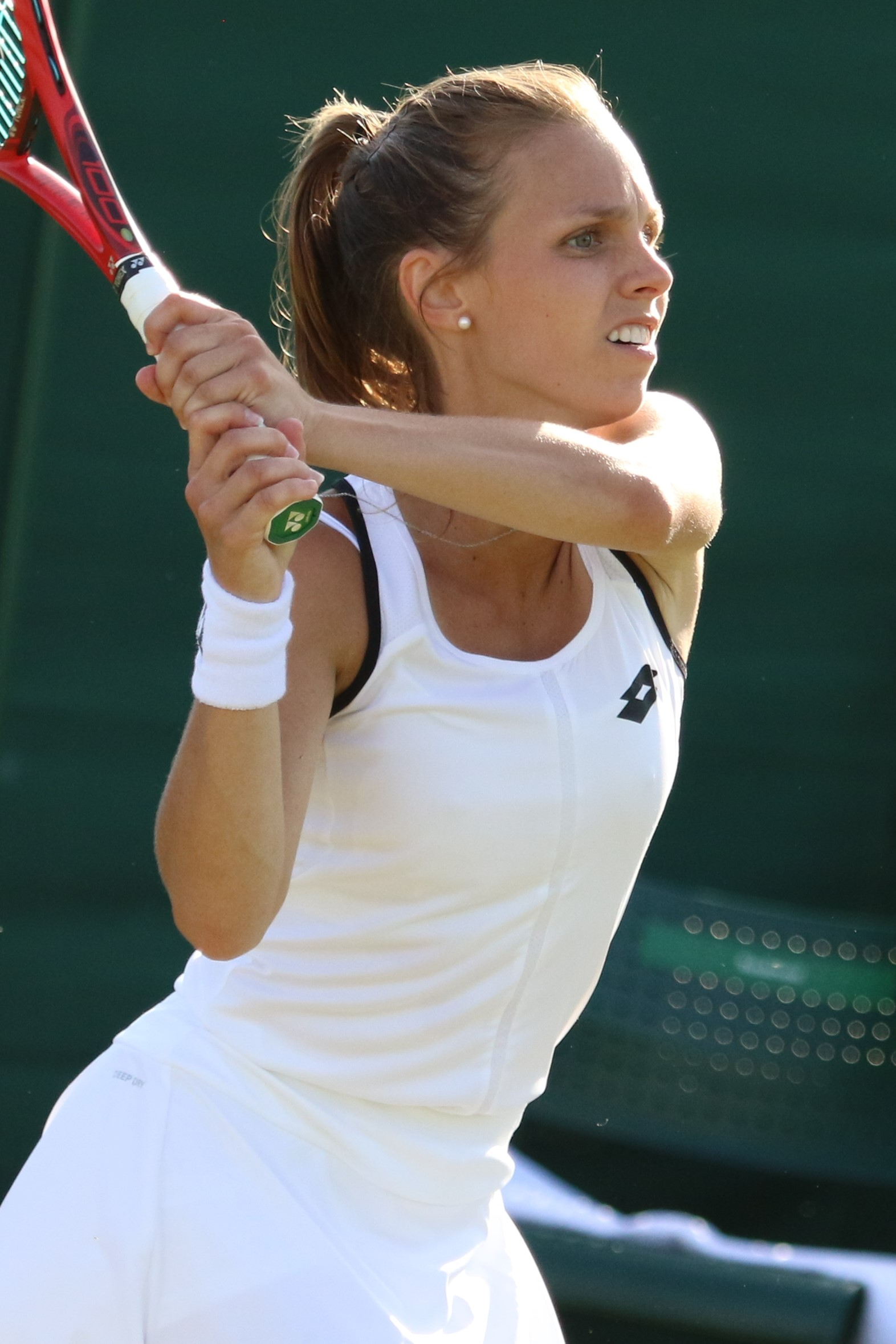
- Pieri at the 2022 Wimbledon Championships
- Country (sports): Italy
- Born: 24 April 1997 (age 29) Lucca, Tuscany
- Plays: Right (two-handed backhand)
- Prize money: $339,606

Singles
- Career record: 320–247
- Career titles: 6 ITF
- Highest ranking: No. 205 (28 May 2018)
- Current ranking: No. 335 (24 August 2026)

Grand Slam singles results
- Australian Open: Q1 (2026)
- Wimbledon: Q2 (2018, 2022)
- US Open: Q2 (2018)

Doubles
- Career record: 13–28
- Highest ranking: No. 563 (15 July 2019)
- Current ranking: No. 977 (24 August 2026)
- Last updated on: 27 August 2026.

Jessica Pieri (born 24 April 1997) is an Italian tennis player. She has a career-high singles ranking of No. 205 by the WTA, achieved on 28 May 2018. She also has a career-high doubles ranking of No. 563, reached on 15 July 2019. She has won six ITF singles titles.

== Career highlights ==
Pieri made her WTA Tour debut at the 2019 Palermo Ladies Open where she qualified for the main draw, defeating Laura Pigossi in the final qualifying round. She lost to Aleksandra Krunić in the first round.

== Personal life ==
She is from Bagni di Lucca. Her sister Tatiana Pieri is also a professional tennis player. She is a member of Circolo Tennis Lucca where she is coached by her father Ivano Pieri.

== ITF Circuit finals ==
=== Singles: 16 (7 titles, 9 runner-ups) ===
Legend
W75 tournaments
W25/35 tournaments
W10 tournaments

Result	W–L	Date	Tournament	Tier	Surface	Opponent	Score
Win	1–0	Aug 2015	ITF Innsbruck, Austria	W10	Clay	(Croatia) Iva Primorac	4–6, 6–1, 6–3
Loss	1–1	Sep 2015	ITF Santa Margherita di Pula, Italy	W10	Clay	(United Kingdom) Amanda Carreras	4–6, 3–6
Win	2–1	Sep 2015	ITF Santa Margherita di Pula	W10	Clay	(Italy) Bianca Turati	6–1, 3–6, 6–4
Win	3–1	Oct 2015	ITF Santa Margherita di Pula	W10	Clay	(Switzerland) Nina Stadler	6–4, 1–6, 7–5
Loss	3–2	Feb 2016	ITF Beinasco, Italy	W25	Clay	(Bulgaria) Isabella Shinikova	6–1, 2–6, 2–6
Win	4–2	Jun 2016	ITF Sassuolo, Italy	W10	Clay	(Italy) Martina Spigarelli	6–2, 6–3
Win	5–2	Sep 2016	ITF Mamaia, Romania	W25	Clay	(Italy) Jasmine Paolini	6–3, 6–4
Loss	5–3	Sep 2017	ITF Sofia, Bulgaria	W25	Clay	(Bulgaria) Viktoriya Tomova	6–7^{(7)}, 6–4, 3–6
Loss	5–4	Sep 2017	ITF Santa Margherita di Pula	W25	Clay	(Italy) Deborah Chiesa	6–7^{(3)}, 3–6
Win	6–4	Oct 2017	ITF Santa Margherita di Pula	W25	Clay	(Austria) Julia Grabher	6–4, 6–1
Loss	6–5	Sep 2022	ITF Santa Margherita di Pula	W25	Clay	(Czech Republic) Brenda Fruhvirtová	4–6, 0–2 ret.
Loss	6–6	Mar 2024	ITF Solarino, Italy	W35	Carpet	(Czech Republic) Linda Klimovičová	3–6, 0–6
Loss	6–7	Jan 2025	ITF Naples, United States	W35	Hard	(Canada) Katherine Sebov	2–6, 0–6
Loss	6–8	Mar 2025	ITF Santa Margherita di Pula	W35	Clay	(Austria) Julia Grabher	5–7, 0–6
Loss	6–9	Jul 2025	ITF The Hague, Netherlands	W75	Clay	(Ukraine) Oleksandra Oliynykova	1–6, 3–6
Win	7–9	Oct 2026	ITF Santa Margherita di Pula	W35	Clay	(France) Nina Radovanovic	6–4, 6–1

=== Doubles: 1 (runner-up) ===
Legend W35 tournaments	Finals by surface Clay (0–1)

Result	Date	Tournament	Tier	Surface	Partner	Opponents	Score
Loss	Mar 2025	ITF Santa Margherita di Pula, Italy	W35	Clay	(Italy) Tatiana Pieri	(Japan) Hikaru Sato (Japan) Ikumi Yamazaki	5–7, 6–2, [4–10]
