= Federica Rossi =

Italian tennis player

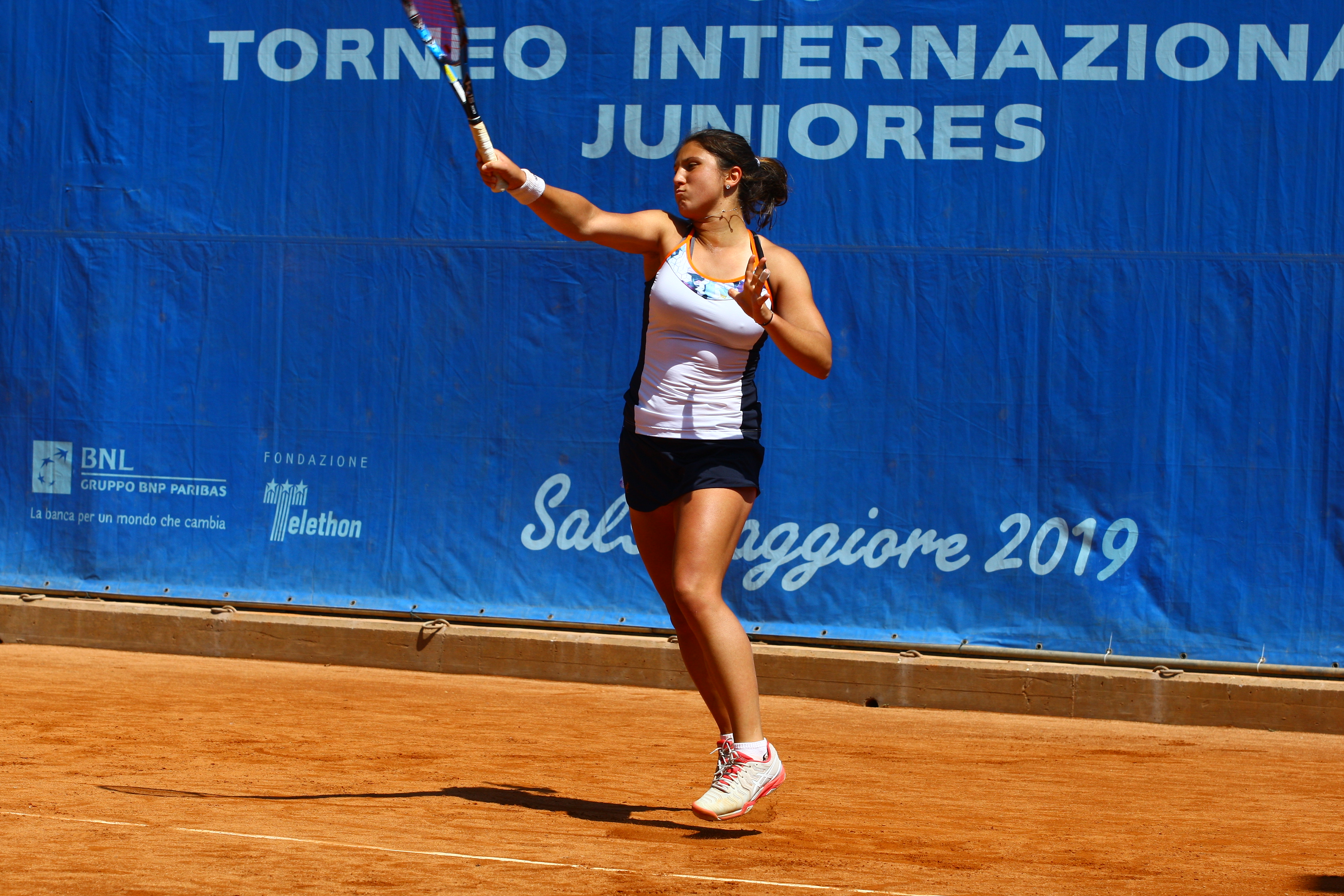
- Federica Rossi in 2019
- Country (sports): Italy
- Born: 7 June 2001 (age 23); Sondrio, Italy
- Plays: Right-handed
- Prize money: $22,786

Singles
- Career record: 81–62
- Career titles: 0
- Highest ranking: No. 605 (25 July 2022)

Doubles
- Career record: 41–40
- Career titles: 2 ITF
- Highest ranking: No. 531 (1 August 2022)
- Last updated on: 24 July 2024.

Federica Rossi (born 7 June 2001) is an Italian professional tennis player.

She has career-high rankings by the WTA of 605 in singles (July 2022) and 531 in doubles (August 2022). She has won two doubles titles on ITF-level in Monastir in 2020, partnering Nuria Brancaccio, and Antalya in 2021, partnering María Paulina Pérez.

Rossi made her WTA Tour main-draw debut at the 2019 Palermo Ladies Open, in the doubles draw, partnering Elisabetta Cocciaretto.

== ITF Circuit finals ==
=== Singles: 1 (runner-up) ===
Legend $15,000 tournaments	Finals by surface Hard (0–1)

Result	W–L	Date	Tournament	Tier	Surface	Opponent	Score
Loss	0–1	Jul 2021	ITF Amarante, Portugal	15,000	Hard	(Japan) Mei Yamaguchi	4–6, 6–3, 4–6

=== Doubles: 4 (2 titles, 2 runner-ups) ===
Legend $25,000 tournaments $15,000 tournaments	Finals by surface Hard (1–1) Clay (1–1)

Result	W–L	Date	Tournament	Tier	Surface	Partner	Opponents	Score
Win	1–0	Feb 2020	ITF Monastir, Tunisia	15,000	Hard	(Italy) Nuria Brancaccio	(Czech Republic) Miriam Kolodziejová (Czech Republic) Jesika Malečková	5–7, 6–3, [10–5]
Win	2–0	Apr 2021	ITF Antalya, Turkey	15,000	Clay	(Colombia) María Paulina Pérez	(Russia) Victoria Mikhaylova (Russia) Ekaterina Shalimova	2–6, 6–4, [10–6]
Loss	2–1	Jul 2021	ITF Amarante, Portugal	15,000	Hard	(Indonesia) Priska Madelyn Nugroho	(France) Océane Babel (France) Lucie Nguyen Tan	4–6, 2–6
Loss	2–2	Mar 2022	ITF Amiens, France	15,000+H	Clay (i)	(Italy) Tatiana Pieri	(France) Océane Babel (France) Lucie Nguyen Tan	3–6, 4–6
