= Liudmila Samsonova =

Russian tennis player (born 1998)

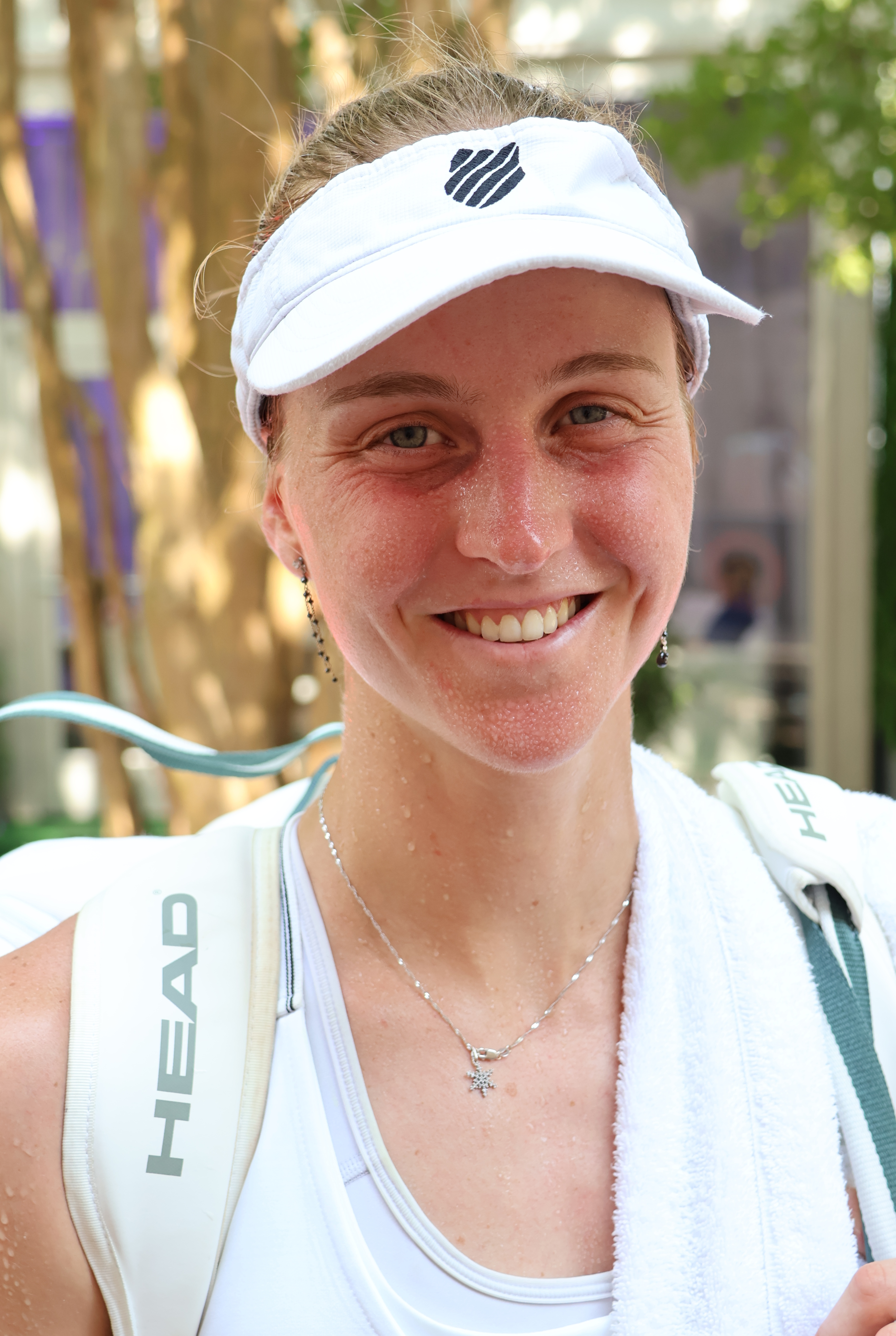
- Samsonova at the 2023 DC Open
- Full name: Liudmila Dmitrievna Samsonova
- Native name: Людмила Дмитриевна Самсонова
- Country (sports): Russia (2013, 2018 –present); Italy (2014–2018)
- Born: 11 November 1998 (age 28) Olenegorsk, Russia
- Height: 1.82 m (6 ft 0 in)
- Turned pro: 2013
- Plays: Right (two-handed backhand)
- Coach: Alessandro Dumitrache (2020-2025), Danilo Pizzorno (2019-August 2025)
- Prize money: $9,310,514

Singles
- Career record: 354–240
- Career titles: 5
- Highest ranking: No. 12 (27 February 2023)
- Current ranking: No. 39 (28 September 2026)

Grand Slam singles results
- Australian Open: 2R (2021, 2022, 2023, 2025)
- French Open: 4R (2025)
- Wimbledon: QF (2025)
- US Open: 4R (2022, 2024)

Doubles
- Career record: 89–84
- Career titles: 4
- Highest ranking: No. 32 (20 April 2026)
- Current ranking: No. 48 (14 September 2026)

Grand Slam doubles results
- Australian Open: 2R (2025)
- French Open: QF (2023)
- Wimbledon: 3R (2025)
- US Open: 2R (2023)

Grand Slam mixed doubles results
- Australian Open: 2R (2024)
- French Open: 2R (2024)
- Wimbledon: 2R (2023)

Team competitions
- Fed Cup: W (2020–21), record 5–0
- Last updated on: 7 October 2026.

Liudmila Dmitrievna Samsonova (Russian: Людмила Дмитриевна Самсонова, IPA: [lʲʊdˈmʲiɫə sɐmˈsonəvə]; born 11 November 1998) is a Russian professional tennis player. She has a career-high singles ranking of world No. 12, achieved on 27 February 2023, and a best doubles ranking of No. 32, reached on 20 April 2026. Samsonova competed for Italy from 2014 to 2018.

Samsonova has won five singles and four doubles titles on the WTA Tour, her first title being a WTA 500 title at the 2021 German Open. She has also won a total of eight singles and three doubles titles on the ITF Circuit. During the 2020–21 Billie Jean King Cup, Samsonova led the Russian team to their first triumph since 2008, winning all five of her matches in both singles and doubles.

== Early life ==
Samsonova was born in the industrial city of Olenegorsk, Murmansk Oblast, Russia. Her family moved with the then-one-year-old Liudmila to Italy. Her father Dmitry, a table tennis player, was invited to play for the club Ferentino based in Turin. Her father urged her to start playing either table tennis or lawn tennis, choosing the latter. She started playing at the age of six, joining the Piatti Tennis Center in Bordighera after the local tennis association helped her financially. Between 2014 and 2018, Liudmila represented Italy in professional tennis, before switching to the Russian flag.

In July 2021, she explained the reason behind her decision was the extra pressure of competing for the Italian national team, a country where tennis is more closely followed than in Russia where it feels to her as though she competes only for herself, especially considering her "boom boom" hard-hitting game style. Russian sources were more specific about the reasons behind the unusual switch after turning 18 in the light of significant numbers of local players switching from the Russian flag. According to the Tennis Weekend, Samsonova faced problems whilst trying to obtain an Italian passport and there was a relatively low level of support for her as an outsider from the Italian Tennis Federation. She keeps practising outside of Russia, as she is unsatisfied with the condition for professional tennis provided by the Russian Tennis Federation domestically. In October 2021, Samsonova said that she did not have an Italian passport and thus never faced the option of choosing between the two flags.

Liudmila admitted that if her parents had stayed in Russia she would have chosen figure skating. She speaks fluent Italian, Russian, and English.

== Career ==
=== Juniors ===
Samsonova reached her highest ITF junior ranking on 18 July 2016, peaking at the 65th spot on the rankings. Her biggest achievements were winning consecutive ITF Junior Circuit Grade-2 tournaments in 2016, defeating notable players such as Kaja Juvan and Marta Kostyuk.

=== 2013–2016: ITF Circuit debut and first titles ===
In 2013, Samsonova made her professional debut at consecutive ITF Circuit tournaments in Umag, but lost her both singles qualifying matches. (Note: To obtain data from this reference, select the corresponding year on the WTA or ITF website.)

2014 saw Samsonova winning her first ITF title at a $10k event in Rome, beating three seeded players to clinch the victory despite being unranked. The win allowed her debuting on the WTA rankings, at the 960th spot and finished the year in 840th.

The upcoming two years saw her struggle on the ITF Circuit, amassing an 11–12 win–loss record which caused her ranking to stagnate. Nonetheless, she managed to return to the top 1000 towards the end of 2016, after reaching the final of an $10k event in Solarino.

=== 2017–2018: Breakthrough on the ITF Circuit ===
Samsonova's first real breakthrough came when she was leaving her teenage years. Reaching three $15k finals in Hammamet, Pula and Mâcon in 2017, respectively, the Russian almost halved her ranking and ended the year ranked 552nd.

2018 was another decent year for her, having reached a total of four finals. Overriding her personal best results, the Russian won her first $25k title at the Open Castilla y León, stunning third seed Başak Eraydın in the final with the loss of just two games.

Samsonova caused a huge shock at the Open de Saint-Malo, a $60k event, coming through three rounds of qualifying to lift the biggest title of her career and breaking the top 200 for the first time in her career. Her 40–21 win–loss record helped Samsonova end the year inside the top 200 for the first time.

=== 2019: WTA Tour, major and top 150 debuts ===
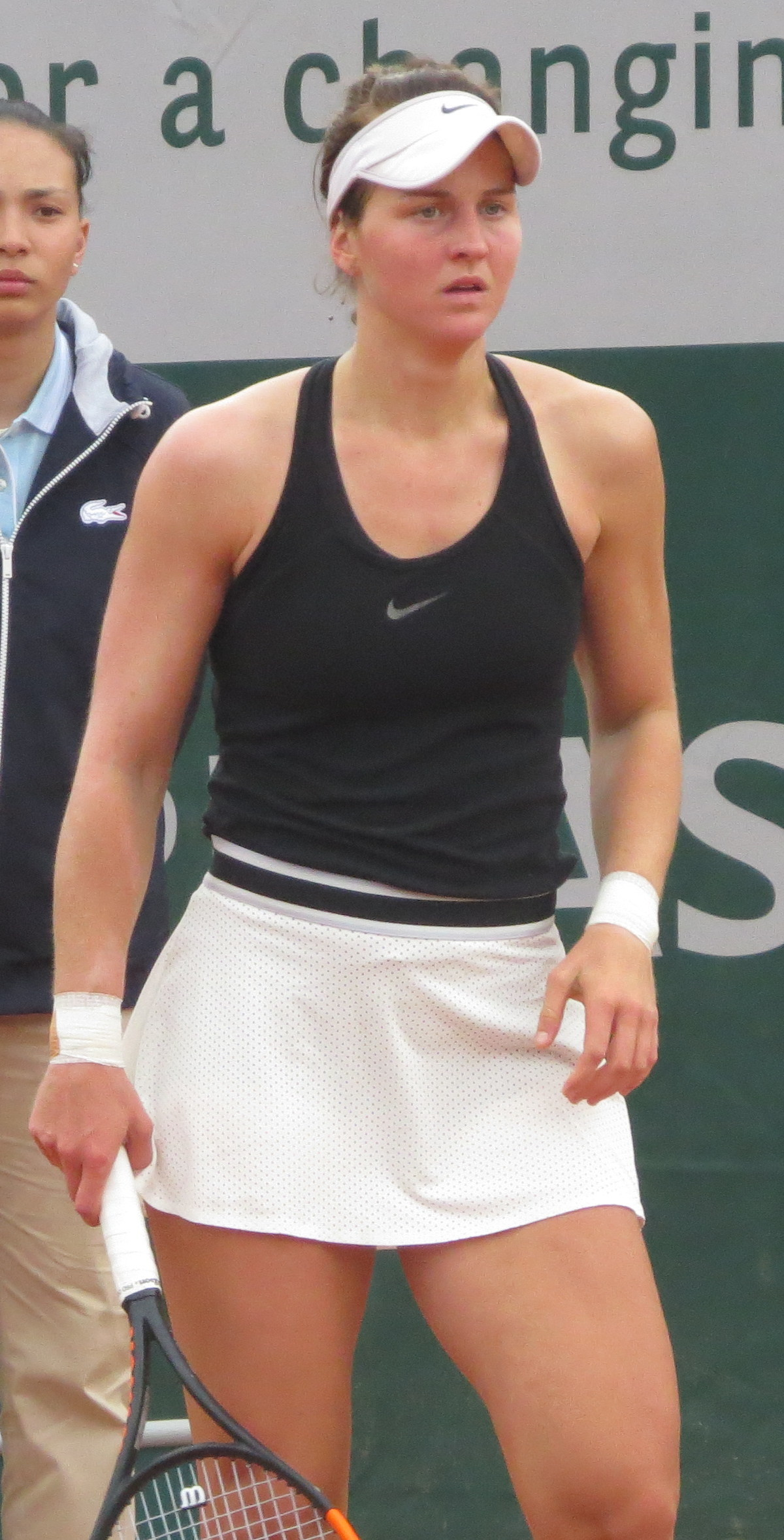
At the 2019 French Open, her major main-draw debut

Samsonova started the year with her major debut at the Australian Open but was defeated in the second qualifying round by Karolína Muchová. Choosing to compete in higher-level WTA tournaments with her ranking, the Russian fell in the qualifying rounds of Premier tournaments in St. Petersburg, Doha and Dubai.

After a five-match losing streak to start the clay-court season, Samsonova stunned several higher-ranked players, including tenth seed Marie Bouzková, to qualify for the main draw at the French Open on her first attempt. Despite losing in the first round to 23rd seed Donna Vekić, she reached a new career-high ranking of world No. 153, on 10 June 2019 after the tournament.

Reaching her second WTA Tour main draw at the rain-plagued Nottingham Open, Samsonova continued her good run of form before falling to former top-15 player Yanina Wickmayer in the final round of qualifying at the Wimbledon Championships, on her debut.

Samsonova received her first direct entry into the Ladies Open Lausanne, but lost to lucky loser Han Xinyun in the second round. In the following week, despite losing to Amandine Hesse in the final qualifying round of the Palermo Ladies Open, she received an entry into the main draw by virtue of an emptied lucky-loser spot. There, she stunned fourth seed and 56th-ranked Tamara Zidanšek, in straight sets, before hitting 41 winners to beat Lausanne champion Fiona Ferro in the quarterfinals to make her first tour semifinal. However, she ran out of steam as she was defeated by eventual champion Jil Teichmann, in straight sets.

Choosing not to defend her title in Saint-Malo, her ranking dipped from 131 to 163 in September, but qualifying for the main draw at the Tashkent Open allowed her to improve her ranking. Going into the Internationaux de Poitiers, an $80k event, unseeded and looming, Samsonova strolled into the final without losing a set but lost to rising star Nina Stojanović, in straight sets. Her good run continued at the WTA 125 Open de Limoges, where she reached the quarterfinals by beating top-100 players Camila Giorgi and Alizé Cornet.

She ended the year with a 32–27 win–loss record with an impressive nine top-100 wins, partly due to competing in more WTA Tour events and facing tougher draws in the process.

=== 2020: Steady presence on WTA Tour ===
Starting the year at the Premier-level Brisbane International, Samsonova survived the qualifying rounds which included a straight-sets win over Kristina Mladenovic. Drawing former US Open champion Sloane Stephens in the first round of the main draw, she clinched the best win of her career by beating the American in three sets, serving ten aces in the process and blasting countless winners with her "fearless aggression". Although she was defeated by world No. 7, Petra Kvitová, in the second round, Samsonova headed to the Australian Open with a new career-high ranking of No. 118.

Beating Wang Xiyu in the final qualifying round, Samsonova qualified for the main draw in Melbourne for the first time in her career. Drawing former French Open champion, Jeļena Ostapenko, in the first round, she was outpowered and committed 24 unforced errors en route a straight-sets defeat. In the match, Samsonova also set the record of hitting the fastest serve on the women's side throughout the entire tournament in 2020.

Heading back to Russia for the St. Petersburg Ladies' Trophy, she qualified for the main draw but fell to fellow Russian Anastasia Potapova in the first round. Similar to 2019, Samsonova failed to qualify for the main draw at the Qatar Ladies Open and the Dubai Tennis Championships before the COVID-19 pandemic forced the tour to go on a hiatus for a couple of months.

With the tour resuming at the Palermo Ladies Open, she took part in the qualifying rounds and defeated Marta Kostyuk for the second time this year en route qualifying for the main draw. Defeating Kirsten Flipkens in the first round, and exacting revenge for her two losses to the Belgian in 2019, Samsonova set up an interesting clash with top seed Petra Martić. Despite leading by a set, Samsonova was unable to beat the Croatian, who ultimately reached semifinals.

Samsonova lost in the first round of both of the US Open and French Open to the resurgent Tsvetana Pironkova and eventual finalist Sofia Kenin, respectively. The Russian led Kenin by a break in the final set in her first career match against a top 10 opposition. She ended her year with a runner-up finish at the 25k event in Reims, falling to Océane Dodin, in straight sets.

=== 2021: Major fourth round, tour title, top 50 ===
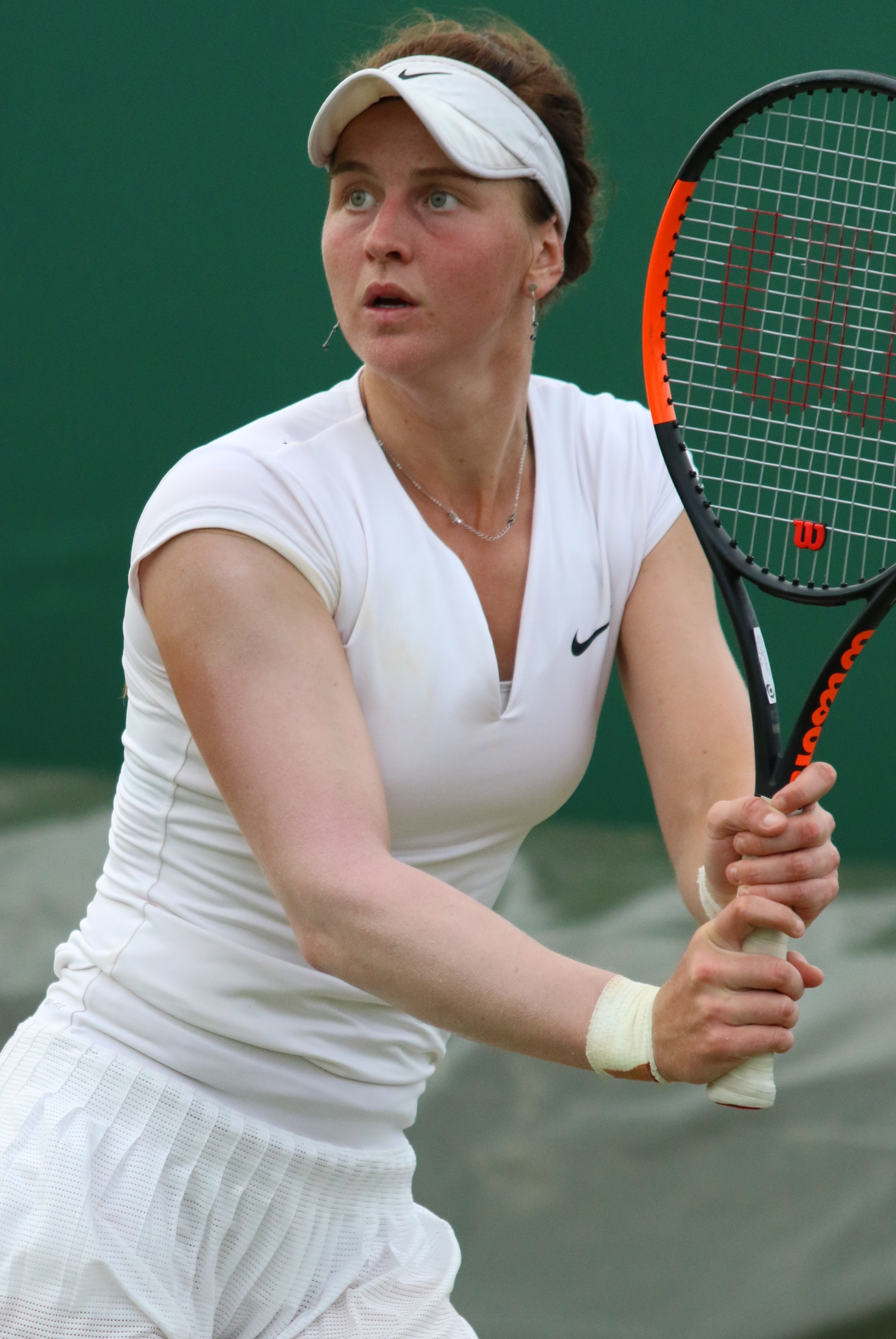
Samsonova (pictured in 2019) reached the fourth round of a major for the first time at the 2021 Wimbledon Championships.

Samsonova began the year at the Australian Open qualifying, which was held in Dubai due to pandemic-related reasons. She beat the 30th seed, former top-30 player Lesia Tsurenko, in straight sets, to book her ticket to Melbourne for a second successive year. She lost in the opening round of the Yarra Valley Classic, a tune-up event to the Australian Open to Tsvetana Pironkova, but rebounded to earn her first Grand Slam main-draw victory over Paula Badosa, recovering from 3–5 down in the final set to triumph. Her run ended in the second round, in the hands of world No. 14, Garbiñe Muguruza, in straight sets. She ended her trip in Australia with another successful qualifying campaign at the Adelaide International, reaching the main draw and challenging sixth seed Martić to three sets.

Samsonova returned to the tour at the Miami Open, where she qualified for the main draw with consecutive wins. In the first round, she then beat fellow hard-hitting Camila Giorgi, in straight sets. She earned the biggest win of her career over world No. 11, Kiki Bertens, after losing just three games, reaching the third round of a WTA 1000 event for the first time in her career. Samsonova lost to Maria Sakkari eventually.

She then began her clay-court campaign at the Charleston Open and MUSC Health Women's Open, held at the same venue in consecutive weeks, and suffered early losses to Coco Gauff and Clara Tauson in both tournaments, respectively. As a lucky loser, Samsonova reached the second round of the Emilia-Romagna Open, before being defeated by Martić once again. She then suffered a shock loss in the first round of qualifying at the French Open, losing to Aleksandra Krunić in three sets.

Beginning her first career grass-court season at the German Open in Berlin, starting as a qualifier, she reached her first Tour final. Her campaign began with a tight win over Ana Konjuh in a final-set tiebreak to qualify for the main draw, before stunning Markéta Vondroušová in the first round. Samsonova then reached her first WTA 500 quarterfinal with a straight-sets defeat of compatriot Veronika Kudermetova, not facing a break point throughout the encounter. Samsonova prevailed 7–6, 2–6, 7–6 over former top-10 player Madison Keys, saving 8/11 break points in the match, and followed it up with a bigger upset over two-time major champion Victoria Azarenka in the semifinal. In the final, she upset world No. 12, Belinda Bencic, from a set down to win her maiden WTA Tour title. With this run she climbed 43 spots to reach a career-high ranking of world No. 63, on 21 June 2021.

By virtue of her Berlin run, she also received a wildcard into the main draw of Wimbledon, making her debut in the main draw. There, she rode on her momentum and reached the fourth round of a major for the first time in her career, after defeating the giant-killing Kaia Kanepi, 22nd seed Jessica Pegula and former Grand Slam champion, Sloane Stephens, in three sets. In her first appearance in the second week of a major, she lost to eventual finalist Karolína Plíšková, in straight sets. Following this best run in her career, she made her top 60 debut.

Contesting the main draws of the Canadian Open and the Western & Southern Open for the first time in her career, Samsonova recorded a good win over top-20 player Elena Rybakina but lost to Sara Sorribes Tormo and Victoria Azarenka, respectively. Samsonova won her first main-draw match at the US Open over Katie Boulter.

Seeded seventh at the Luxembourg Open, she defeated Misaki Doi and Océane Dodin to reach her first quarterfinal since Berlin. There, she stunned the top seed Bencic once again, prevailing in straight sets. Samsonova lost to Jeļena Ostapenko in the semifinals, but reached another new career-high ranking after the tournament. She made her main-draw debut at the Indian Wells Open, triumphing over Kateryna Kozlova in the first round, but fell to compatriot Kudermetova in the second round.

Samsonova lost to Ajla Tomljanović in the first round of the Kremlin Cup, then reached the semifinals of the Courmayeur Ladies Open but lost to Tauson once again, this time after having five match points. Nonetheless, she managed to make her top 40 debut after the tournament. She ended season at the BJK Cup Finals, making her debut in the tournament but played a pivotal role in clinching the title for Russia as she went unbeaten throughout the week. She clinched singles wins over Sloane Stephens and Belinda Bencic and extended her head-to-head record against both players to 3–0. She also partnered Veronika Kudermetova and won all six sets they contested, defeating Canada, France and the United States.

=== 2022: Indian Wells & US Open fourth rounds, top 20, three titles ===
Samsonova began at the Melbourne Summer Set 1 and suffered a first-round loss to former top-10 player Andrea Petkovic. She reached her first quarterfinal of the season at the Adelaide International 2 but lost to Madison Keys. At the Australian Open, she beat qualifier Emina Bektas in the first round, reaching the second for the second consecutive year.

She lost in the qualifying rounds of the Dubai Championships, before falling to Alizé Cornet in the first round of the Qatar Ladies Open, in a three-set match.

Nonetheless, she found form in Indian Wells where she made the fourth round of a WTA 1000 event for the first time in her career. However, she lost to Petra Martić in the fourth round in their fourth consecutive meeting.

She reached the top 25 on 9 May 2022 after a semifinal showing at the Stuttgart Grand Prix which she lost to top seed Iga Świątek. She lost in the first round at both WTA 1000 tournaments: the Madrid Open and the Italian Open. At the French Open, she lost also in the first round, to Danka Kovinić.

During the summer hardcourt tour, Samsonova collected two back-to-back titles. First, she played at the Washington Open, and won five matches including a second-round win over top-10 player Emma Raducanu. In the final, she defeated Kaia Kanepi, after losing the first set. Her next stop was supposed to be Canadian Open qualifying but she was forced to withdraw due to still playing at Washington D.C. She then played at the Tennis in Cleveland where she beat Aliaksandra Sasnovich in the final, won her second title of the year and recorded her tenth consecutive win.

At the US Open, she reached the fourth round for the first time at this major defeating qualifier Sára Bejlek, 14th seed Leylah Fernandez, and Aleksandra Krunić. In the fourth round, she lost to Ajla Tomljanović after an intense one hour first-set battle, losing eight set points and a 20 minute game.

In Tokyo, she defeated Elena Rybakina, Wang Xinyu, third seed Garbiñe Muguruza, and Zhang Shuai to reached her third final of the season. In the final, she beat first-time finalist Zheng Qinwen to win her fourth career title. However, she lost in the first round of the San Diego Open to Bianca Andreescu, in three sets. In Guadalajara, she defeated Aryna Sabalenka in the second round for her first top-5 win, before losing to Marie Bouzková in three sets. With this result, she made her top 20 debut in the WTA rankings on 24 October.

=== 2023: Top 15, two WTA 1000 finals in singles, top 40 in doubles ===
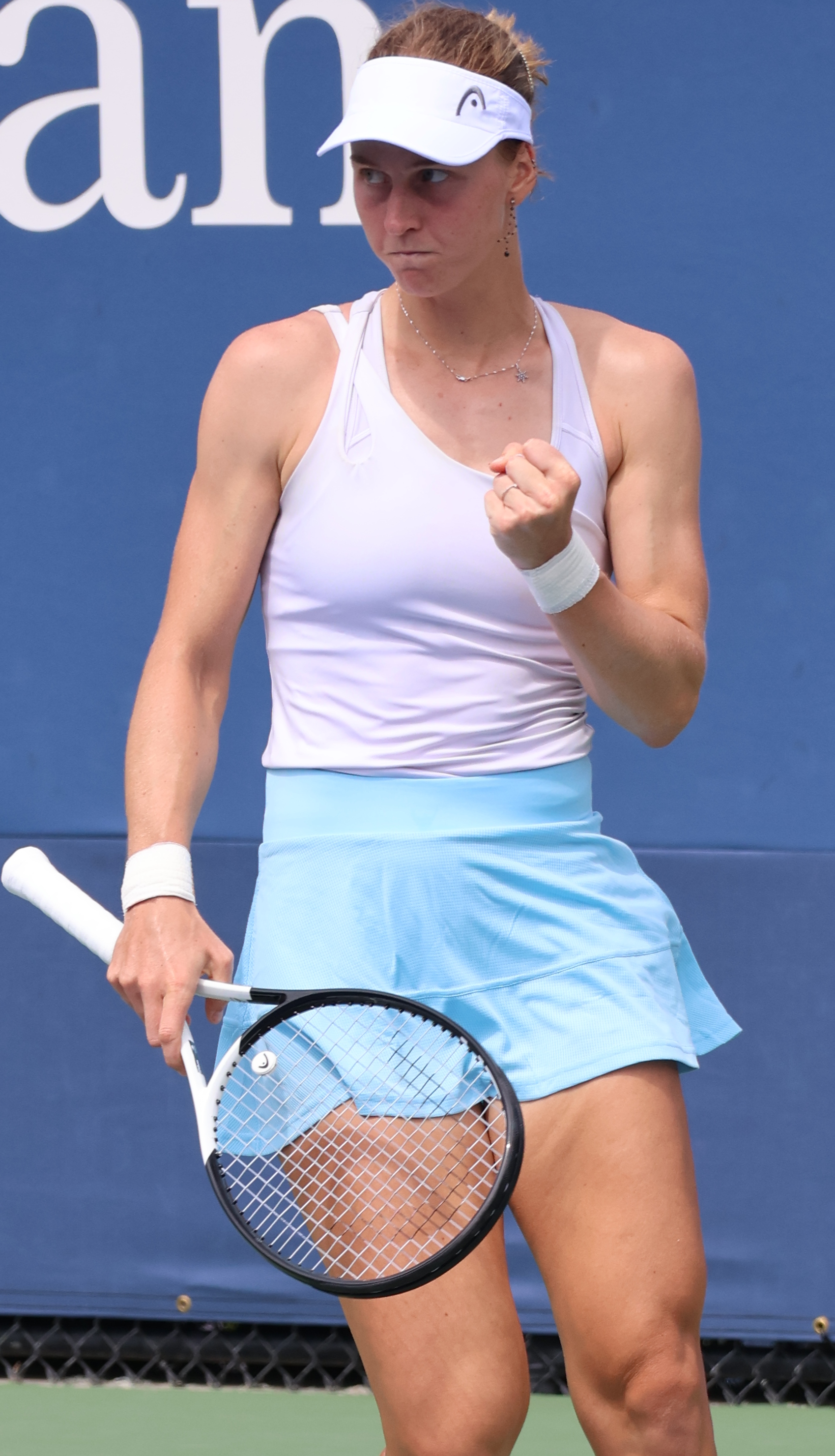
Samsonova at the 2023 US Open

Samsonova began her season at the Adelaide International 1 as she swept past Zhang Shuai for her first win of the year. She lost in the second round to eventual champion Aryna Sabalenka in two tiebreaks despite being up 5–1 in the first set. This was followed by a straight-sets loss to Amanda Anisimova in Adelaide 2 in round one. Seeded 18th at the Australian Open, she defeated Jasmine Paolini in straight sets, before losing to Donna Vekić in the second, winning only three games.

At Dubai, she also won in the first round, against Paula Badosa, in the third longest match of the year lasting three hours and 22 minutes. She reached the third round by a walkover from Zheng Qinwen but lost to top seed and world No. 1, Iga Świątek. At the same tournament, with Veronika Kudermetova, she won the doubles title. As a result, she reached new career-high rankings of world No. 12 in singles and No. 59 in doubles on 27 February 2023.

She reached the top 40 in doubles on 12 June 2023, following the French Open where she reached the quarterfinals with Kudermetova.

Samsonova reached the final of the WTA 1000 Canadian Open, in which she lost to Jessica Pegula. She also reached the final at the WTA 1000 China Open in which she lost to Iga Świątek.

=== 2024: Fifth WTA Tour singles title ===
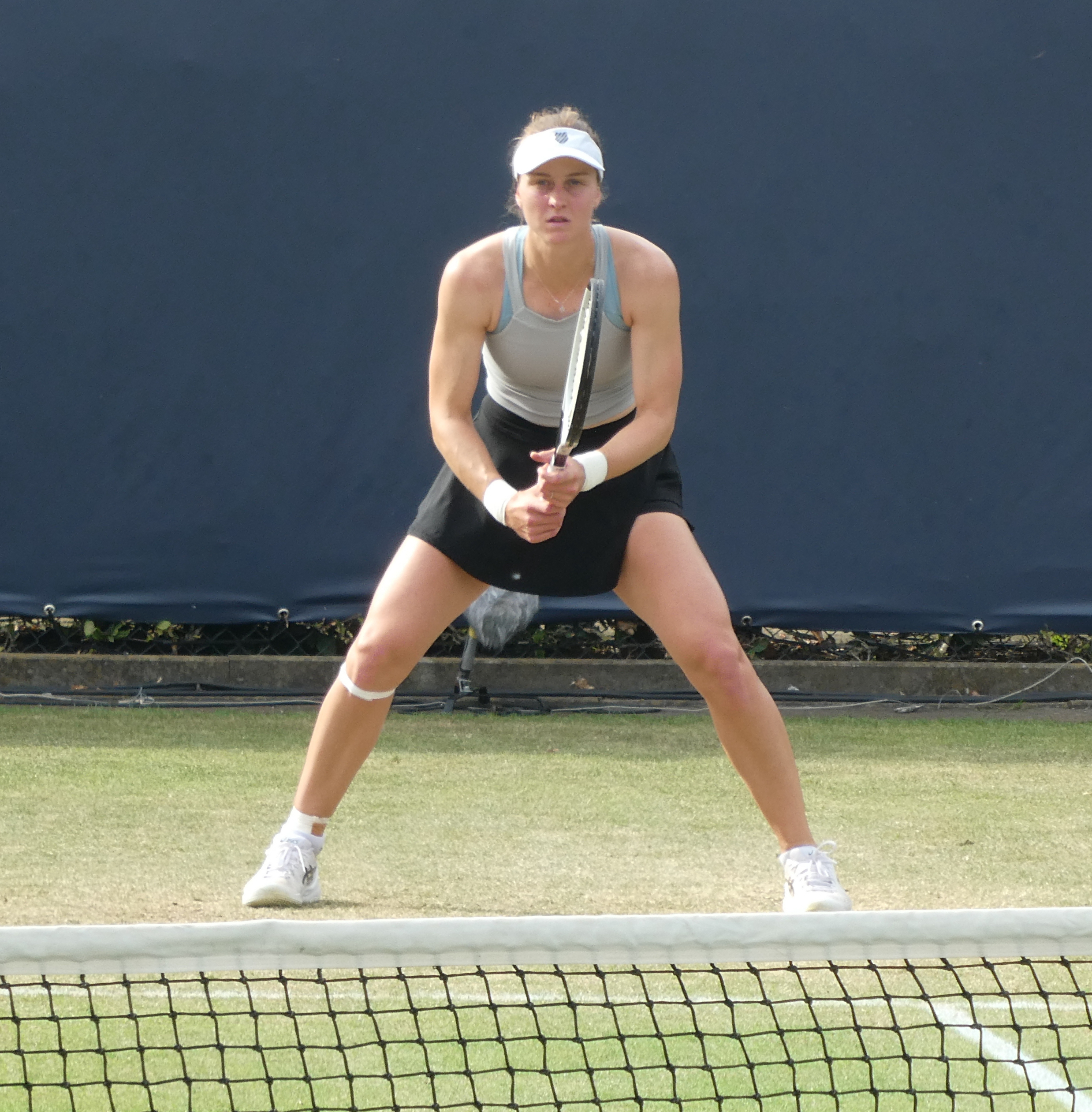
Samsonova at the 2024 Rosmalen Open

Samsonova had a low-key start to the season. She participated in the Brisbane International as the fourth seed and lost in her debut in the second round to Mirra Andreeva, in straight sets. Soon after, she participated in the Adelaide International as the seventh seed, being defeated in the first round by Laura Siegemund, in three sets. At the Australian Open, as the 13th seed, she also lost in the first round to Amanda Anisimova, in straight sets.

Continuing her hardcourt campaign in the Middle East at the Abu Dhabi Open as the eight seed, Samsonova defeated Lesia Tsurenko, Anhelina Kalinina, and Barbora Krejčíková in straight sets on the way to the semifinals, before losing to Elena Rybakina in three sets.

She won her fifth WTA Tour title at the Rosmalen Open defeating Bianca Andreescu in the final.

In August, Samsonova reached back to back quarterfinals at the Canadian Open and the Cincinnati Open, losing to Diana Shnaider and Aryna Sabalenka, respectively.

=== 2025: Wimbledon quarterfinal, third doubles title ===
Samsonova reached the semifinals at the Adelaide International, defeating qualifiers Marie Bouzková and Belinda Bencic, then second seed Emma Navarro, before losing to eventual champion Madison Keys. Seeded 25th at the Australian Open, she overcame Kamilla Rakhimova, before losing in the second round to Olga Danilović.

In May, Samsonova was the runner-up at the Strasbourg Open, recording wins over Linda Nosková, wildcard entrant Diane Parry, third seed Paula Badosa and Danielle Collins, before losing in the final to fourth seed Elena Rybakina in three sets.

Seeded 19th at the French Open, Samsonova defeated Mayar Sherif, qualifier Leyre Romero Gormaz and Dayana Yastremska to make it through to the fourth round, where she lost to eighth seed Zheng Qinwen.

Moving onto the grass-court season, she partnered Nicole Melichar-Martinez to reach the doubles final at the Rosmalen Open, losing to second seeds Irina Khromacheva and Fanny Stollár in straight sets. The following week at the Berlin Open, Samsonova defeated Naomi Osaka, defending champion Jessica Pegula and Amanda Anisimova to make the semifinals, where she lost to qualifier Wang Xinyu. Seeded 19th at Wimbledon, she recorded straight set wins over Maya Joint, Yuliia Starodubtseva, 16th seed Daria Kasatkina and Jéssica Bouzas Maneiro to reach the quarterfinals, where she lost to eighth seed Iga Świątek.

In August as top seed at the Cleveland Open, Samsonova defeated Caroline Dolehide and qualifier Wang Yafan, before losing to another qualifier and eventual champion Sorana Cîrstea in the quarterfinals.

Teaming up with Nicole Melichar-Martinez, she won her third WTA Tour doubles title at the Ningbo Open, overcoming Tímea Babos and Luisa Stefani in the final which went to a deciding champions tiebreak.

=== 2026: Guadalajara semifinal, Stuttgart doubles title ===
Samsonova started her 2026 season at the Brisbane International, where, as 10th seed, she received a bye and registered wins over wildcard entrant Emerson Jones and qualifier Aliaksandra Sasnovich to make it through to the quarterfinals, at which point her run was ended by fourth seed Jessica Pegula.

In February, at the WTA 500 Abu Dhabi Open, she defeated Sofia Kenin and Janice Tjen, before losing to wildcard entrant Hailey Baptiste in the quarterfinals.

In April, teaming up with Nicole Melichar-Martinez, Samsonova won her fourth WTA Tour doubles title at the Stuttgart Open, defeating Jeļena Ostapenko and Zhang Shuai in the final.

She again reached the quarterfinals at a WTA 500 event, the Washington Open, defeating eighth seed Madison Keys and Wang Xinyu, before losing to fourth seed Diana Shnaider in the last eight.

Seeded eighth at the WTA 500 Guadalajara Open, Samsonova registered wins over Elsa Jacquemot, Kayla Day and top seed Marta Kostyuk to reach the semifinals, where she lost to Peyton Stearns.

== Billie Jean King Cup ==
Samsonova has competed for the Russian team since 2021, securing her first nomination at the 2020–21 Billie Jean King Cup Finals, where she was the fifth-ranked singles player for Russia. She made her debut in doubles alongside Kudermetova, defeating the world No. 5 pair Gabriela Dabrowski and Rebecca Marino 6–3 and 6–1. Continuing her partnership with Kudermetova, they defeated Clara Burel and Alizé Cornet in 47 minutes to seal a 2–1 win over France, booking their spot in the semifinals. Samsonova was pivotal in Russia's win over the United States as she made her singles debut against Sloane Stephens, coming from a set and multiple break points down to win the first rubber. She then came back alongside Kudermetova to beat Shelby Rogers and CoCo Vandeweghe and seal a spot in the final. In the final, Samsonova continued her unbeaten run, coming in as a late replacement for an injured Pavlyuchenkova to stun Belinda Bencic, once again from a set down, to clinch the title for Russia.

== Career statistics ==
=== Grand Slam performance timelines ===
Key
| W | F | SF | QF | #R | RR | Q# | P# | DNQ | A | Z# | PO | G | S | B | NMS | NTI | P | NH |

(W) winner; (F) finalist; (SF) semifinalist; (QF) quarterfinalist; (#R) rounds 4, 3, 2, 1; (RR) round-robin stage; (Q#) qualification round; (P#) preliminary round; (DNQ) did not qualify; (A) absent; (Z#) Davis/Fed Cup Zonal Group (with number indication) or (PO) play-off; (G) gold, (S) silver or (B) bronze Olympic/Paralympic medal; (NMS) not a Masters tournament; (NTI) not a Tier I tournament; (P) postponed; (NH) not held; (SR) strike rate (events won / competed); (W–L) win–loss record.
To avoid confusion and double counting, these charts are updated at the conclusion of a tournament or when the player's participation has ended.

==== Singles ====
Current through the 2026 US Open.

| Tournaments | 2019 | 2020 | 2021 | 2022 | 2023 | 2024 | 2025 | 2026 | SR | W–L | Win% |
|---|---|---|---|---|---|---|---|---|---|---|---|
| Australian Open | Q2 | 1R | 2R | 2R | 2R | 1R | 2R | 1R | 0 / 7 | 4–7 | 36% |
| French Open | 1R | 1R | Q1 | 1R | 2R | 3R | 4R | 1R | 0 / 7 | 6–7 | 46% |
| Wimbledon | Q3 | NH | 4R | A (Note: Suspended due to the ban of Russian and Belarusian athletes in light of the Russian invasion of Ukraine.) | 1R | 3R | QF | 3R | 0 / 5 | 11–5 | 69% |
| US Open | Q2 | 1R | 2R | 4R | 3R | 4R | 2R | 1R | 0 / 7 | 10–7 | 59% |
| Win–loss | 0–1 | 0–3 | 5–3 | 4–3 | 4–4 | 7–4 | 9–4 | 2–4 | 0 / 26 | 31–26 | 54% |

==== Doubles ====
| Tournaments | 2021 | 2022 | 2023 | 2024 | 2025 | 2026 | SR | W–L | Win% |
|---|---|---|---|---|---|---|---|---|---|
| Australian Open | A | 1R | 1R | A | 2R | 1R | 0 / 4 | 1–4 | 20% |
| French Open | A | 1R | QF | A | 2R | 3R | 0 / 4 | 6–4 | 60% |
| Wimbledon | A | A | A | 1R | 3R | A | 0 / 2 | 2–2 | 50% |
| US Open | 1R | 1R | 2R | 1R | A | A | 0 / 4 | 1–4 | 20% |
| Win–loss | 0–1 | 0–3 | 4–3 | 0–2 | 4–3 | 2–2 | 0 / 14 | 10–14 | 42% |

=== WTA 1000 finals ===
==== Singles: 2 (2 runner-ups) ====
| Result | Year | Tournament | Surface | Opponent | Score |
|---|---|---|---|---|---|
| Loss | 2023 | Canadian Open | Hard | (United States) Jessica Pegula | 1–6, 0–6 |
| Loss | 2023 | China Open | Hard | (Poland) Iga Świątek | 2–6, 2–6 |

==== Doubles: 1 (title) ====
| Result | Year | Tournament | Surface | Partner | Opponents | Score |
|---|---|---|---|---|---|---|
| Win | 2023 | Dubai Championships | Hard | Veronika Kudermetova | (Chinese Taipei) Chan Hao-ching (Chinese Taipei) Latisha Chan | 6–4, 6–7^{(4–7)}, [10–1] |

== Awards ==
International

- Billie Jean King Cup Finals:
  - Most Valuable Player: 2021.
  - Rookie of the Year: 2021.

National

- The Russian Cup in the nomination:
  - Team of the Year: 2021.
