= Federica Bilardo =

Italian tennis player

- Country (sports): Italy
- Born: 6 July 1999 (age 25)
- Prize money: $65,459

Singles
- Career record: 210–147
- Career titles: 3 ITF
- Highest ranking: No. 428 (23 October 2023)
- Current ranking: No. 566 (22 July 2024)

Doubles
- Career record: 57–34
- Career titles: 5 ITF
- Highest ranking: No. 425 (29 July 2019)
- Last updated on: 26 July 2024.

Federica Bilardo (born 6 July 1999) is an Italian professional tennis player.

Bilardo has career-high WTA rankings of 428 in singles, achieved 23 October 2023, and 425 in doubles, reached on 29 July 2019.

She made her WTA Tour main-draw debut at the 2019 Palermo Ladies Open in the doubles tournament, partnering Dalila Spiteri.

== ITF Circuit finals ==
=== Singles: 13 (3 titles, 10 runner-ups) ===
Legend
W25 tournaments
W10/15 tournaments

Result	W–L	Date	Tournament	Tier	Surface	Opponent	Score
Loss	0–1	Mar 2015	ITF Solarino, Italy	W10	Hard	(Italy) Gioia Barbieri	6–7^{(5)}, 0–6
Loss	0–2	Aug 2016	ITF Tarvisio, Italy	W10	Clay	(Slovenia) Manca Pislak	1–6, 0–6
Loss	0–3	Jun 2017	ITF Sassuolo, Italy	W15	Clay	(Italy) Stefania Rubini	7–5, 0–6, 4–6
Loss	0–4	Jul 2017	ITF Tarvisio, Italy	W15	Clay	(Slovenia) Nina Potočnik	2–6, 3–6
Win	1–4	Jun 2018	ITF Antalya, Turkey	W15	Clay	(Bulgaria) Dia Evtimova	6–1, 4–6, 6–1
Loss	1–5	Dec 2018	ITF Solarino, Italy	W15	Carpet	(Argentina) Catalina Pella	1–6, 2–6
Loss	1–6	Jun 2021	ITF Antalya, Turkey	W15	Clay	(United States) Hurricane Tyra Black	6–2, 4–6, 4–6
Loss	1–7	Jun 2021	ITF Antalya, Turkey	W15	Clay	(Romania) Ilona Georgiana Ghioroaie	5–7, 2–6
Loss	1–8	Nov 2021	ITF Solarino, Italy	W15	Hard	(Australia) Alicia Smith	3–6, 6–7^{(6)}
Loss	1–9	May 2022	ITF Antalya, Turkey	W15	Clay	(Russia) Tatiana Barkova	6–7^{(4)}, 5–7
Win	2–9	Aug 2022	ITF Padua, Italy	W15	Clay	(Italy) Laura Mair	6–2, 6–1
Win	3–9	Nov 2022	ITF Solarino, Italy	W15	Carpet	(Sweden) Jacqueline Cabaj Awad	6–4, 4–6, 6–3
Loss	3–10	Sep 2023	ITF Santa Margherita di Pula, Italy	W25	Clay	(Germany) Katharina Hobgarski	5–7, 3–6

=== Doubles: 9 (5 titles, 4 runner-ups) ===
Legend
W10/15 tournaments

Result	W–L	Date	Tournament	Tier	Surface	Partner	Opponents	Score
Loss	0–1	Oct 2015	ITF Santa Margherita di Pula, Italy	W10	Hard	(Italy) Diletta Alessandrelli	(France) Josephine Boualem (Spain) Ariadna Marti Riembau	5–7, 6–7^{(5)}
Win	1–1	Oct 2015	ITF Santa Margherita di Pula, Italy	W10	Clay	(Russia) Olesya Pervushina	(Slovakia) Nikola Dolaková (Slovakia) Barbora Kotelesová	6–3, 6–4
Loss	1–2	Nov 2015	ITF Santa Margherita di Pula, Italy	W10	Clay	(Russia) Olesya Pervushina	(Italy) Martina di Giuseppe (Italy) Anastasia Grymalska	2–6, 4–6
Win	2–2	Oct 2016	ITF Santa Margherita di Pula, Italy	W10	Clay	(Italy) Tatiana Pieri	(Switzerland) Ylena In-Albon (Italy) Giorgia Marchetti	6–4, 7–5
Loss	2–3	Jul 2017	ITF Târgu Jiu, Romania	W15	Clay	(Italy) Michele Alexandra Zmău	(Australia) Samantha Harris (Australia) Belinda Woolcock	6–0, 4–6, [4–10]
Win	3–3	Apr 2018	ITF Antalya, Turkey	W15	Clay	(Japan) Haruna Arakawa	(Russia) Kamilla Rakhimova (Czech Republic) Kateřina Vaňková	4–6, 6–4, [10–8]
Win	4–3	May 2021	ITF Antalya, Turkey	W15	Clay	(Belarus) Kristina Dmitruk	(United Kingdom) Matilda Mutavdzic (Croatia) Antonia Ružić	6–3, 0–6, [10–7]
Loss	4–4	Jun 2021	ITF Antalya, Turkey	W15	Clay	(Ukraine) Liubov Kostenko	(Czech Republic) Sára Bejlek (Turkey) Doğa Türkmen	6–4, 1–6, [7–10]
Win	5–4	Jun 2021	ITF Antalya, Turkey	W15	Clay	(United States) Taylor Ng	(United States) Rachel Gailis (United States) Jamilah Snells	6–0, 6–3
