= Dalila Spiteri =

Italian tennis player (born 1997)

- Country (sports): Italy
- Born: 24 April 1997 (age 29)
- Plays: Right-handed
- Prize money: $167,648

Singles
- Career record: 321–239
- Career titles: 5 ITF
- Highest ranking: No. 265 (16 March 2026)
- Current ranking: No. 291 (29 June 2026)

Doubles
- Career record: 110–106
- Career titles: 7 ITF
- Highest ranking: No. 315 (18 September 2023)
- Current ranking: No. 1,475 (29 June 2026)
- Last updated on: 6 July 2026.

Dalila Spiteri (born 24 April 1997) is an Italian tennis player.

Spiteri has a career-high WTA singles ranking of 265, achieved on 16 March 2026. She also has a career-high WTA doubles ranking of 315, reached on 15 September 2023.

== Career ==
Spiteri made her WTA Tour main-draw debut at the 2019 Palermo Ladies Open, in the doubles draw, partnering Federica Bilardo.

She started the 2020 season by winning three $15k tournaments (one in singles and two in doubles) in February.

Spiteri made her WTA 1000 main-draw debut at the 2023 Italian Open, where she received a wildcard into the singles draw, losing in the first round to Caty McNally.

== ITF Circuit finals ==
=== Singles: 9 (5 titles, 4 runner-ups) ===
Legend W50 tournaments W25/35 tournaments W10/15 tournaments	Finals by surface Hard (1–1) Clay (3–3) Carpet (1–0)

Result	W–L	Date	Tournament	Tier	Surface	Opponent	Score
Win	1–0	Nov 2016	ITF Solarino, Italy	W10	Carpet	(Italy) Anna-Giulia Remondina	6–1, 6–2
Win	2–0	Feb 2020	ITF Heraklion, Greece	W15	Clay	(Italy) Martina Spigarelli	6–4, 6–1
Loss	2–1	Jul 2022	ITF Kottingbrunn, Austria	W15	Clay	(France) Manon Arcangioli	6–0, 4–6, 0–6
Win	3–1	Feb 2023	ITF Sharm El Sheikh, Egypt	W15	Hard	(Romania) Anca Todoni	6–3, 6–7^{(4)}, 6–1
Loss	3–2	Nov 2023	ITF Solarino, Italy	W25	Carpet	(Italy) Lisa Pigato	6–1, 2–6, 3–6
Loss	3–3	Jun 2024	ITF Tarvisio, Italy	W35	Clay	(Italy) Nuria Brancaccio	4–6, 2–6
Loss	3–4	Apr 2025	ITF Santa Margherita di Pula, Italy	W35	Clay	(Ukraine) Oleksandra Oliynykova	7–5, 2–6, 2–6
Win	4–4	Jun 2025	ITF Roma Cup, Italy	W35	Clay	(Italy) Giorgia Pedone	6–3, 7–5
Win	5–4	Jan 2026	ITF Buenos Aires, Argentina	W50	Clay	(Argentina) Victoria Bosio	7–6^{(5)}, 6–3

=== Doubles: 16 (7 titles, 9 runner-ups) ===
Legend W60 tournaments W25/35 tournaments W10/15 tournaments	Finals by surface Hard (0–1) Clay (6–7) Carpet (1–1)

Result	W–L	Date	Tournament	Tier	Surface	Partner	Opponents	Score
Win	1–0	Oct 2016	ITF Santa Margherita di Pula, Italy	W10	Clay	(Czech Republic) Petra Krejsová	(India) Snehadevi Reddy (Bosnia and Herzegovina) Jelena Simić	6–0, 1–6, [10–3]
Loss	1–1	Nov 2016	ITF Santa Margherita di Pula, Italy	W10	Clay	(Italy) Anna-Giulia Remondina	(Switzerland) Ylena In-Albon (Italy) Giorgia Marchetti	1–6, 3–6
Win	2–1	Nov 2016	ITF Solarino, Italy	W10	Carpet	(Italy) Anna-Giulia Remondina	(France) Mathilde Armitano (France) Elixane Lechemia	w/o
Loss	2–2	May 2017	ITF Hammamet, Tunisia	W15	Clay	(Germany) Lisa Ponomar	(Serbia) Natalija Kostić (Bosnia and Herzegovina) Jelena Simić	4–6, 4–6
Win	3–2	Aug 2017	ITF Vienna, Austria	W15	Clay	(Italy) Anastasia Grymalska	(Italy) Lucrezia Stefanini (Mexico) Ana Sofía Sánchez	0–6, 6–3, [10–8]
Loss	3–3	Aug 2017	ITF Sezze, Italy	W15	Clay	(Russia) Maria Marfutina	(Italy) Federica di Sarra (Italy) Giorgia Marchetti	6–3, 3–6, [9–11]
Loss	3–4	Oct 2017	ITF Óbidos, Portugal	W25	Carpet	(Belarus) Lizaveta Ancherova	(Russia) Olga Doroshina (Russia) Yana Sizikova	0–6, 2–6
Loss	3–5	Jun 2018	ITF Tarvisio, Italy	W15	Clay	(Italy) Maria Masini	(Italy) Camilla Abbate (Czech Republic) Laetitia Pulchertová	w/o
Loss	3–6	Aug 2018	ITF Biella, Italy	W15	Clay	(Belarus) Sviatlana Pirazhenka	(Italy) Aurora Zantedeschi (Italy) Costanza Traversi	2–6, 3–6
Win	4–6	Feb 2020	ITF Heraklion, Greece	W15	Clay	(Italy) Martina Colmegna	(Romania) Ioana Gașpar (Germany) Romy Kölzer	7–6^{(3)}, 6–1
Win	5–6	Feb 2020	ITF Heraklion, Greece	W15	Clay	(Italy) Tatiana Pieri	(Italy) Nuria Brancaccio (Denmark) Olga Helmi	4–6, 6–0, [10–6]
Loss	5–7	Oct 2020	ITF Heraklion, Greece	W15	Clay	(Italy) Melania Delai	(Romania) Andreea Roșca (Romania) Ioana Loredana Roșca	1–6, 3–6
Loss	5–8	Jul 2022	ITF Kottingbrunn, Austria	W15	Clay	(Chile) Fernanda Labraña	(Hungary) Amarissa Tóth (Turkey) Doğa Türkmen	w/o
Loss	5–9	Mar 2023	ITF Pretoria, South Africa	W60	Hard	(Belgium) Sofia Costoulas	(Japan) Mai Hontama (France) Alice Tubello	3–6, 3–6
Win	6–9	Aug 2023	Verbier Open, Switzerland	W25	Clay	(Italy) Deborah Chiesa	(Algeria) Inès Ibbou (Switzerland) Naïma Karamoko	1–6, 6–3, [10–7]
Win	7–9	May 2025	ITF Santa Margherita di Pula, Italy	W35	Clay	(Italy) Deborah Chiesa	(Spain) Ariana Geerlings (Italy) Sofia Rocchetti	w/o
