= 2026 Guangzhou Open =

- Date: October 26–November 1
- Edition: 20th
- Category: WTA 250
- Draw: 32S / 16D
- Prize money: $283,347
- Surface: Hard / outdoor
- Location: Guangzhou, China
- Venue: Nansha International Tennis Center

Champions

Singles
- (United Kingdom) Harriet Dart

Doubles
- (Uzbekistan) Polina Kudermetova / (Uzbekistan) Maria Timofeeva
- Guangzhou Open

The 2026 Guangzhou Open was a professional women's tennis tournament played on outdoor hardcourts. It was the 20th edition of the Guangzhou Open, and part of the WTA 250 tournaments of the 2026 WTA Tour. It took place at the Nansha International Tennis Center in Guangzhou, China, from 26 October through 1 November, 2026.

== Finals ==
=== Singles ===
- (United Kingdom) Harriet Dart def. (Austria) Lilli Tagger, 4–6, 6–3, 6–4

=== Doubles ===
- (Uzbekistan) Polina Kudermetova / (Uzbekistan) Maria Timofeeva def. (Chinese Taipei) Cho I-hsuan / (Chinese Taipei) Cho Yi-tsen, 7–5, 7–6^{(7–1)}

== Singles main-draw entrants ==
=== Seeds ===
Country	Player	Rank^{1}	Seed
UKR	Daria Snigur	40	1
INA	Janice Tjen	46	2
THA	Lanlana Tararudee	53	3
AUT	Lilli Tagger	57	4
ESP	Paula Badosa	61	5
TUR	Zeynep Sönmez	63	6
UZB	Maria Timofeeva	70	7
USA	Katie Volynets	73	8

- ^{1} Rankings are as of 19 October 2026

=== Other entrants ===
The following players received wildcards into the singles main draw:

- (United States) Sofia Kenin
- (China) Shi Han
- (China) Sun Xinran
- (United States) Venus Williams

The following players received entry using a protected ranking:

- (Spain) Sara Sorribes Tormo
- (Switzerland) Jil Teichmann

The following players received entry from the qualifying draw:

- (United Kingdom) Harriet Dart
- Alevtina Ibragimova
- (Serbia) Teodora Kostović
- (United States) Carol Young Suh Lee
- Tatiana Prozorova
- (Ukraine) Dayana Yastremska

The following player received entry as a lucky loser:

- Anastasia Zakharova

=== Withdrawals ===
- (Czech Republic) Sára Bejlek → replaced by (Uzbekistan) Polina Kudermetova
- (Ukraine) Anhelina Kalinina → replaced by (Austria) Sinja Kraus
- Alina Korneeva → replaced by (Switzerland) Simona Waltert
- (Croatia) Petra Marčinko → replaced by (Switzerland) Jil Teichmann
- (Belgium) Hanne Vandewinkel → replaced by (Thailand) Mananchaya Sawangkaew
- (China) Wang Xiyu → replaced by Anastasia Zakharova

== Doubles main-draw entrants ==
=== Seeds ===
Country	Player	Country	Player	Rank^{1}	Seed
	Maria Kozyreva	GBR	Maia Lumsden	83	1
CZE	Jesika Malečková	CZE	Miriam Škoch	106	2
HUN	Fanny Stollár	TPE	Wu Fang-hsien	108	3
JPN	Eri Hozumi	SLO	Andreja Klepač	117	4

- ^{1} Rankings are as of 19 October 2026

=== Other entrants ===
The following pairs received wildcards into the doubles main draw:

- (China) Qu Yihan / (China) Zhang Ruien
- (Indonesia) Janice Tjen / (United States) Venus Williams

== See also ==
- 2026 Guangzhou Huangpu International Tennis Open
