= 2025 ATV Tennis Open =

Tennis tournament

- Date: 14–20 July 2025
- Edition: 15th
- Category: WTA 125 tournaments
- Prize money: $115,000
- Surface: Clay / Outdoor
- Location: Rome, Italy

Champions

Singles
- (Croatia) Petra Marčinko

Doubles
- (Chinese Taipei) Cho I-hsuan / (Chinese Taipei) Cho Yi-tsen
← 2024 ·	ATV Tennis Open	· 2026 →

The 2025 ATV Tennis Open (also known as the ATV Bancomat Tennis Open for sponsorship reasons) was a professional women's tennis tournament played on outdoor clay courts. It was the fifteenth edition of the tournament, and part of the 2025 WTA 125 tournaments (upgraded from ITF status in previous years). It took place in Rome, Italy, between 14 and 20 July 2025.

== Singles main-draw entrants ==
=== Seeds ===
Country	Player	Rank	Seed
USA	Varvara Lepchenko	121	1
LAT	Darja Semeņistaja	128	2
	Oksana Selekhmeteva	144	3
	Tatiana Prozorova	156	4
LIE	Kathinka von Deichmann	159	5
CZE	Dominika Šalková	165	6
SRB	Lola Radivojević	173	7
BEL	Hanne Vandewinkel	175	8

- Rankings are as of 30 June 2025.

=== Other entrants ===
The following players received wildcards into the singles main draw:

- Alisa Oktiabreva
- (Italy) Lisa Pigato
- (Italy) Dalila Spiteri
- (Italy) Aurora Zantedeschi

The following players received entry from the qualifying draw:

- (Italy) Tyra Caterina Grant
- (France) Amandine Hesse
- (Switzerland) Ylena In-Albon
- (United States) Claire Liu

The following player received entry as a lucky loser:

- (France) Alice Ramé

=== Withdrawals ===
- (Italy) Camilla Rosatello → replaced by (France) Alice Ramé

== Doubles main-draw entrants ==
=== Seeds ===
Country	Player	Country	Player	Rank^{1}	Seed
BRA	Laura Pigossi	POL	Katarzyna Piter	161	1
JPN	Momoko Kobori	JPN	Ayano Shimizu	271	2

- ^{1} Rankings are as of 30 June 2025.

=== Other entrants ===
The following pair received a wildcard into the doubles main draw:

- (Italy) Tyra Caterina Grant / (Italy) Lisa Pigato

== Champions ==
=== Singles ===
- (Croatia) Petra Marčinko def. Oksana Selekhmeteva 6–3, 4–6, 6–3

=== Doubles ===
- (Chinese Taipei) Cho I-hsuan / (Chinese Taipei) Cho Yi-tsen def. (Georgia (country)) Ekaterine Gorgodze / (Latvia) Darja Semeņistaja 4–6, 6–4, [10–6]
