= 2026 Guangzhou Open – Singles =

Singles
- 2026 Guangzhou Open

Final
- Champion: (United Kingdom) Harriet Dart
- Runner-up: (Austria) Lilli Tagger
- Score: 4–6, 6–3, 6–4
- Date: 1 November 2026

Details
- Draw: 32 (6 Q / 4 WC)
- Seeds: 8

Events
Singles	Doubles
- Guangzhou Open

At the 2026 Guangzhou Open, Harriet Dart defeated Lilli Tagger in the final, 4–6, 6–3, 6–4 to win the women's singles tennis title. The tournament took place on outdoor hard courts in Guangzhou, China, and was a WTA 250-level event. Dart saved three match points, in the semifinals against Sun Xinran, en route to her first WTA Tour singles title. Dart was the first qualifier to win in Guangzhou since Li Na won the inaugural edition in 2004.

Ann Li was the reigning champion, but she chose to compete in Tokyo instead.

== Seeds ==
1. (Ukraine) Daria Snigur (first round)
2. (Indonesia) Janice Tjen (second round)
3. (Thailand) Lanlana Tararudee (first round)
4. (Austria) Lilli Tagger (final)
5. (Spain) Paula Badosa (quarterfinals)
6. (Turkey) Zeynep Sönmez (second round)
7. (Uzbekistan) Maria Timofeeva (second round)
8. (United States) Katie Volynets (first round)

== Draw ==
Key

- Q = Qualifier
- WC = Wild card
- LL = Lucky loser
- Alt = Alternate
- ITF = ITF entry
- PR = Protected ranking
- SR = Special ranking
- SE = Special exempt
- JE = Junior exempt
- JR = Junior Accelerator Programme entrant
- CO = College Accelerator Programme entrant
- NG = Next Gen Accelerator Program entrant
- w/o = Walkover
- r = Retired
- d = Defaulted

=== Finals ===
Semifinals
(Spain) Kaitlin Quevedo	2	0
4	(Austria) Lilli Tagger	6	6
WC	(China) Sun Xinran	7	6^{1}	0
Q	(United Kingdom) Harriet Dart	5	7^{7}	6

Final
4	(Austria) Lilli Tagger	6	3	4
Q	(United Kingdom) Harriet Dart	4	6	6

=== Top half ===
First round
1	(Ukraine) D Snigur	4	2
(Hungary) A Bondár	6	6
(Spain) K Quevedo	6	6^{5}	6
WC	(United States) S Kenin	4	7^{7}	4
(Switzerland) S Waltert	5	2
PR	(Switzerland) J Teichmann	7	6
PR	(Spain) S Sorribes Tormo	1	6	2
6	(Turkey) Z Sönmez	6	4	6
4	(Austria) L Tagger	6	6
WC	(United States) V Williams	2	2
LL	A Zakharova	6^{6}	4
(Poland) M Linette	7^{8}	6
WC	(China) H Shi	6	6
Q	A Ibragimova	4	4
Q	(Ukraine) D Yastremska	7	1	7^{9}
8	(United States) K Volynets	5	6	6^{7}

Second round
(Hungary) A Bondár	5	3
(Spain) K Quevedo	7	6
PR	(Switzerland) J Teichmann	4	6	6
6	(Turkey) Z Sönmez	6	3	1
4	(Austria) L Tagger	6	6
(Poland) M Linette	2	2
WC	(China) H Shi	7	6
Q	(Ukraine) D Yastremska	5	4

Quarterfinals
(Spain) K Quevedo	7^{7}	6
PR	(Switzerland) J Teichmann	6^{2}	3
4	(Austria) L Tagger	6	3	7
WC	(China) H Shi	4	6	5

Semifinals
(Spain) K Quevedo	2	0
4	(Austria) L Tagger	6	6

=== Bottom half ===
First round
7	(Uzbekistan) M Timofeeva	6	6
Q	(Serbia) T Kostović	4	1
WC	(China) X Sun	6	6
(Thailand) M Sawangkaew	3	4
(Croatia) A Ružić	6	6^{5}	4
(United States) C Liu	4	7^{7}	6
(Czech Republic) K Siniaková	2	6	6
3	(Thailand) L Tararudee	6	1	4
5	(Spain) P Badosa	6	6
Q	(United States) CYS Lee	1	4
(Hungary) P Udvardy	4	2
(Austria) S Kraus	6	6
Q	(United Kingdom) H Dart	6	2	6
Q	T Prozorova	4	6	2
(Uzbekistan) P Kudermetova	2	2
2	(Indonesia) J Tjen	6	6

Second round
7	(Uzbekistan) M Timofeeva	3	6	6^{3}
WC	(China) X Sun	6	4	7^{7}
(United States) C Liu	w/o
(Czech Republic) K Siniaková
5	(Spain) P Badosa	6	6
(Austria) S Kraus	1	4
Q	(United Kingdom) H Dart	6	3	6
2	(Indonesia) J Tjen	4	6	3

Quarterfinals
WC	(China) X Sun	7	7^{7}
(United States) C Liu	5	6^{2}
5	(Spain) P Badosa	6	2	4
Q	(United Kingdom) H Dart	3	6	6

Semifinals
WC	(China) X Sun	7	6^{1}	0
Q	(United Kingdom) H Dart	5	7^{7}	6

== Qualifying ==
=== Seeds ===
1. (Ukraine) Dayana Yastremska (qualified)
2. (Uzbekistan) Polina Kudermetova (moved to main draw)
3. Anastasia Zakharova (qualifying competition, lucky loser)
4. (United Kingdom) Harriet Dart (qualified)
5. Tatiana Prozorova (qualified)
6. (Belgium) Jeline Vandromme (first round)
7. (Poland) Katarzyna Kawa (withdrew)
8. (Australia) Maddison Inglis (first round)
9. (Australia) Emerson Jones (qualifying competition)
10. Alexandra Shubladze (first round)
11. (Serbia) Teodora Kostović (qualified)
12. (Italy) Tyra Caterina Grant (first round)

=== Qualifiers ===
1. (Ukraine) Dayana Yastremska
2. Alevtina Ibragimova
3. (Serbia) Teodora Kostović
4. (United Kingdom) Harriet Dart
5. Tatiana Prozorova
6. (United States) Carol Young Suh Lee

=== Lucky loser ===
1. Anastasia Zakharova

=== Qualifying draw ===
==== First qualifier ====
First round
1	(Ukraine) Dayana Yastremska	7^{7}	4	7^{7}
(China) You Xiaodi	6^{4}	6	6^{3}
WC	(Hong Kong) Cody Wong	6	1	4
9	(Australia) Emerson Jones	4	6	6

Qualifying competition
1	(Ukraine) Dayana Yastremska	6	6
9	(Australia) Emerson Jones	2	4

==== Second qualifier ====
First round
Alt	(Japan) Rina Saigo	6	2	4
Alevtina Ibragimova	3	6	6
Polina Iatcenko	6	2	6
10	Alexandra Shubladze	3	6	4

Qualifying competition
Alevtina Ibragimova	6	6
Polina Iatcenko	3	3

==== Third qualifier ====
First round
3	Anastasia Zakharova	6	6
WC	(China) Zhang Ruien	2	2
WC	(China) Qu Yihan	3	6	3
11	(Serbia) Teodora Kostović	6	0	6

Qualifying competition
3	Anastasia Zakharova	3	2
11	(Serbia) Teodora Kostović	6	6

==== Fourth qualifier ====
First round
4	(United Kingdom) Harriet Dart	5	7^{7}	6
WC	(Hong Kong) Shek Cheuk-ying	7	6^{5}	1
(Czech Republic) Linda Fruhvirtová	6	2	6^{7}
Alt	(Japan) Mei Yamaguchi	2	6	7^{9}

Qualifying competition
4	(United Kingdom) Harriet Dart	6	6
Alt	(Japan) Mei Yamaguchi	2	1

==== Fifth qualifier ====
First round
5	Tatiana Prozorova	6	5	6
(Georgia (country)) Ekaterine Gorgodze	3	7	3
(Chinese Taipei) Joanna Garland	6	6
8	(Australia) Maddison Inglis	1	3

Qualifying competition
5	Tatiana Prozorova	6	3	6
(Chinese Taipei) Joanna Garland	4	6	3

==== Sixth qualifier ====
First round
6	(Belgium) Jeline Vandromme	7	6^{3}	3
(United States) Carol Young Suh Lee	5	7^{7}	6
Elena Pridankina	6	6
12	(Italy) Tyra Caterina Grant	3	3

Qualifying competition
(United States) Carol Young Suh Lee	6	6
Elena Pridankina	4	2
