= 2026 Open delle Puglie =

- Date: 1–7 June
- Edition: 5th
- Category: WTA 125
- Draw: 32S / 8D
- Prize money: €100,000
- Surface: Clay
- Location: Foggia, Italy
- Venue: Circolo Tennis Club Foggia

Champions

Singles
- (Spain) Leyre Romero Gormaz

Doubles
- (Chinese Taipei) Cho I-hsuan / (Chinese Taipei) Cho Yi-tsen
- Open delle Puglie

The 2026 Open delle Puglie Trofeo was a professional women's tennis tournament played on outdoor clay courts. It was the fifth edition of the tournament and part of the 2026 WTA 125 tournaments. It took place at the Circolo Tennis Club in Foggia, Italy between 1 and 7 June 2026 after the previous editions were held in Bari.

== Singles entrants ==
=== Seeds ===
Country	Player	Rank^{1}	Seed
EGY	Mayar Sherif	129	1
ITA	Lisa Pigato	138	2
BEL	Sofia Costoulas	144	3
ESP	Leyre Romero Gormaz	158	4
ITA	Nuria Brancaccio	163	5
GRE	Despina Papamichail	167	6
USA	Varvara Lepchenko	169	7
ITA	Lucia Bronzetti	172	8

- ^{1} Rankings are as of 25 May 2026.

=== Other entrants ===
The following players received a wildcard into the singles main draw:

- (Italy) Tyra Caterina Grant
- (United States) Varvara Lepchenko
- (Italy) Laura Mair
- (Italy) Vittoria Paganetti

The following players received entry from the qualifying draw:

- (China) Dang Yiming
- (Romania) Andreea Prisăcariu
- (Slovenia) Nika Radišić
- (Italy) Viola Turini

=== Withdrawals ===
Before the tournament

- (Poland) Maja Chwalińska → replaced by (Italy) Giorgia Pedone
- (Slovenia) Veronika Erjavec → replaced by (Greece) Sapfo Sakellaridi
- (Canada) Leylah Fernandez → replaced by (China) Gao Xinyu
- (North Macedonia) Lina Gjorcheska → replaced by (Georgia (country)) Ekaterine Gorgodze
- (Austria) Julia Grabher → replaced by (France) Chloé Paquet
- (United Kingdom) Francesca Jones → replaced by (Bulgaria) Elizara Yaneva
- (Ukraine) Anhelina Kalinina → replaced by Darya Astakhova
- (United States) Elizabeth Mandlik → replaced by (Sweden) Lisa Zaar
- (Argentina) Nadia Podoroska → replaced by (Argentina) Victoria Bosio
- (Spain) Kaitlin Quevedo → replaced by (Italy) Tatiana Pieri
- (Netherlands) Arantxa Rus → replaced by (Italy) Miriana Tona
- (Argentina) Solana Sierra → replaced by (Spain) Carlota Martínez Círez
- (Bulgaria) Viktoriya Tomova → replaced by (China) You Xiaodi
- (United States) Katie Volynets → replaced by (France) Alice Tubello

=== Retirement ===
- (Belgium) Sofia Costoulas (right ankle injury)

== Doubles entrants ==
=== Seeds ===
Country	Player	Country	Player	Rank^{1}	Seed
	Maria Kozyreva		Iryna Shymanovich	125	1
TPE	Cho I-hsuan	TPE	Cho Yi-tsen	196	2

- ^{1} rankings as of 25 May 2026.

=== Other entrants ===
The following pair received a wildcard into the doubles main draw:

- (Italy) Eleonora Alvisi / (Italy) Nuria Brancaccio

=== Withdrawals ===
Before the tournament

- (Belgium) Sofia Costoulas / (Greece) Despina Papamichail → replaced by (China) Dang Yiming / (China) You Xiaodi

=== Retirements ===
- (Georgia (country)) Ekaterine Gorgodze / (France) Carole Monnet (Gorgodze - illness)

== Champions ==
=== Singles ===
- (Spain) Leyre Romero Gormaz def. (Italy) Tyra Caterina Grant 7–5, 0–6, 6–2

=== Doubles ===
- (Chinese Taipei) Cho I-hsuan / (Chinese Taipei) Cho Yi-tsen def. (France) Estelle Cascino / (Slovenia) Nika Radišić 4–6, 6–3, [10–4]
