= 2026 Emilia-Romagna Open =

- Date: 11–16 May (women); 15–20 June (men)
- Edition: 6th (women); 8th (men)
- Category: ATP Challenger 125; WTA 125
- Surface: Clay
- Location: Sassuolo, Italy (men); Parma, Italy (women)

Champions

Men's singles
- (France) Luca Van Assche

Women's singles
- (Ukraine) Dayana Yastremska

Men's doubles
- (Switzerland) Jakub Paul / (United States) Ryan Seggerman

Women's doubles
- (Chinese Taipei) Cho I-hsuan / (Chinese Taipei) Cho Yi-tsen
- Emilia-Romagna Open

The 2026 Emilia-Romagna Open, known as the Emilia-Romagna Tennis Cup for men and Parma Ladies Open presented by Iren for women, was a professional tennis tournament played on clay courts in Sassuolo, Italy as an ATP Challenger Tour 125 event and in Parma, Italy as a WTA 125 event. The eighth edition of the men's event was held between 15 and 20 June on the 2026 ATP Challenger Tour and the sixth edition for the women as part of the 2026 WTA 125 tournaments between 11 and 16 May.

== Champions ==
=== Men's singles ===
- (France) Luca Van Assche def. (Austria) Sebastian Ofner 2–6, 6–2, 6–3.

=== Women's singles ===
- (Ukraine) Dayana Yastremska def. (Czech Republic) Barbora Krejčiková 6–3, 6–3

=== Men's doubles ===
- (Switzerland) Jakub Paul / (United States) Ryan Seggerman def. (Thailand) Pruchya Isaro / (India) Niki Kaliyanda Poonacha 6–2, 7–6^{(7–5)}.

=== Women's doubles ===
- (Chinese Taipei) Cho I-hsuan / (Chinese Taipei) Cho Yi-tsen def. (Italy) Marta Lombardini / (Italy) Federica Urgesi, 6–2, 6–2

== Men's singles main-draw entrants ==
=== Seeds ===
Country	Player	Rank^{1}	Seed
NED	Jesper de Jong	83	1
FRA	Luca Van Assche	98	2
BIH	Damir Džumhur	103	3
AUT	Sebastian Ofner	124	4
ITA	Stefano Travaglia	134	5
ESP	Pedro Martínez	139	6
ITA	Francesco Passaro	166	7
ITA	Marco Cecchinato	172	8

- ^{1} Rankings are as of 8 June 2026.

=== Other entrants ===
The following players received wildcards into the singles main draw:

- (Italy) Federico Bondioli
- (Italy) Carlo Alberto Caniato
- (Italy) Jacopo Vasamì

The following players received entry into the singles main draw as alternates:

- Petr Bar Biryukov
- (Spain) Daniel Rincón

The following players received entry from the qualifying draw:

- (Italy) Enrico Dalla Valle
- (Italy) Juan Cruz Martin Manzano
- (Spain) Oriol Roca Batalla
- (United States) Ryan Seggerman
- (Italy) Alexander Weis
- (Germany) Luca Wiedenmann

== Women's singles main-draw entrants ==
=== Seeds ===
Country	Player	Rank^{†}	Seed
FRA	Loïs Boisson	43	1
ESP	Jéssica Bouzas Maneiro	51	2
UKR	Dayana Yastremska	52	3
CZE	Barbora Krejčíková	53	4
ARG	Solana Sierra	72	5
USA	Alycia Parks	79	6
COL	Camila Osorio	83	7
SUI	Viktorija Golubic	90	8

^{†} Rankings are as of 4 May 2026.

=== Other entrants ===
The following players received wildcard entry into the singles main draw:

- (Italy) Noemi Basiletti
- (Italy) Marta Lombardini
- (Italy) Federica Urgesi
- (Ukraine) Dayana Yastremska

The following players received entry from qualifying draw:

- (Switzerland) Susan Bandecchi
- (Argentina) Victoria Bosio
- (Italy) Deborah Chiesa
- (Kazakhstan) Zhibek Kulambayeva

=== Withdrawals ===
Before the tournament

- (Hungary) Anna Bondár → replaced by (Czech Republic) Dominika Šalková
- (Philippines) Alexandra Eala → replaced by (Italy) Lucia Bronzetti
- (Slovenia) Veronika Erjavec → replaced by (Slovenia) Kaja Juvan
- (Austria) Julia Grabher → replaced by (Germany) Anna-Lena Friedsam
- (United States) Sofia Kenin → replaced by (United States) Varvara Lepchenko
- (United States) Ann Li → replaced by (Poland) Maja Chwalińska
- (Germany) Eva Lys → replaced by (United States) Mary Stoiana
- (United States) Caty McNally → replaced by (France) Carole Monnet
- Oksana Selekhmeteva → replaced by (Italy) Lisa Pigato
- (Switzerland) Simona Waltert → replaced by (Andorra) Victoria Jiménez Kasintseva
- (China) Wang Xinyu → replaced by (China) Yuan Yue

=== Retirement ===
- (Poland) Maja Chwalińska

== Women's doubles draw entrants ==
=== Seeds ===
Country	Player	Country	Player	Rank^{1}	Seed
CZE	Anastasia Dețiuc	CHN	Tang Qianhui	136	1
FRA	Estelle Cascino	CHN	Feng Shuo	198	2
TPE	Cho I-hsuan	TPE	Cho Yi-tsen	208	3
GBR	Madeleine Brooks	FRA	Elixane Lechemia	275	4

- ^{1} Rankings as of 4 May 2026.

=== Other entrants ===
The following pairs received wildcards into the doubles main draw:

- (Italy) Elena Bocchi / (Italy) Camilla Montenet
