= 2026 Guangzhou Open – Doubles =

Doubles
- 2026 Guangzhou Open

Final
- Champions: (Uzbekistan) Polina Kudermetova (Uzbekistan) Maria Timofeeva
- Runners-up: (Chinese Taipei) Cho I-hsuan (Chinese Taipei) Cho Yi-tsen
- Score: 7–5, 7–6^{(7–1)}
- Date: 1 November 2026

Details
- Draw: 16
- Seeds: 4

Events
| Singles | Doubles |
- Guangzhou Open

Polina Kudermetova and Maria Timofeeva defeated Cho I-hsuan and Cho Yi-tsen in the final, 7–5, 7–6^{(7–1)} to win the doubles tennis title at the 2026 Guangzhou Open. It was the first WTA Tour doubles title for both players.

Katarzyna Piter and Janice Tjen were the reigning champions, but Piter did not participate this year. Tjen partnered Venus Williams, but they lost in the semifinals to Kudermetova and Timofeeva.

== Seeds ==
1. Maria Kozyreva / (United Kingdom) Maia Lumsden (quarterfinals)
2. (Czech Republic) Jesika Malečková / (Czech Republic) Miriam Škoch (first round)
3. (Hungary) Fanny Stollár / (Chinese Taipei) Wu Fang-hsien (quarterfinals)
4. (Japan) Eri Hozumi / (Slovenia) Andreja Klepač (quarterfinals)

== Draw ==
Key

- Q = Qualifier
- WC = Wild card
- LL = Lucky loser
- Alt = Alternate
- ITF = ITF entry
- PR = Protected ranking
- SR = Special ranking
- SE = Special exempt
- JE = Junior exempt
- JR = Junior Accelerator Programme entrant
- CO = College Accelerator Programme entrant
- NG = Next Gen Accelerator Program entrant
- w/o = Walkover
- r = Retired
- d = Defaulted

=== Draw ===
First round
1 | M Kozyreva (United Kingdom) M Lumsden | 6 | 6
(India) R Bhosale (Thailand) P Plipuech | 3 | 3
(Netherlands) I Haverlag (Kazakhstan) Z Kulambayeva | 6 | 4 | [10]
WC | (China) Y Qu (China) R Zhang | 3 | 6 | [5]
3 | (Hungary) F Stollár (Chinese Taipei) F-h Wu | 6 | 6^{5} | [10]
(Switzerland) J Teichmann (Switzerland) S Waltert | 3 | 7^{7} | [7]
(Hungary) A Bondár (Turkey) Z Sönmez | 2 | 6^{6}
(Chinese Taipei) I-h Cho (Chinese Taipei) Y-t Cho | 6 | 7^{8}
(Uzbekistan) P Kudermetova (Uzbekistan) M Timofeeva | 6 | 3 | [10]
(Argentina) N Fossa Huergo; E Pridankina | 1 | 6 | [6]
(United Kingdom) H Dart (Switzerland) N Karamoko | 6 | 2 | [5]
4 | (Japan) E Hozumi (Slovenia) A Klepač | 3 | 6 | [10]
(Georgia (country)) E Gorgodze (Belgium) K Zimmermann | 0 | 5
WC | (Indonesia) J Tjen (United States) V Williams | 6 | 7
(Ukraine) L Kichenok (Japan) M Ninomiya | 3 | 6 | [10]
2 | (Czech Republic) J Malečková (Czech Republic) M Škoch | 6 | 4 | [8]

Quarterfinals
1 | M Kozyreva (United Kingdom) M Lumsden | 6 | 3 | [8]
(Netherlands) I Haverlag (Kazakhstan) Z Kulambayeva | 3 | 6 | [10]
3 | (Hungary) F Stollár (Chinese Taipei) F-h Wu | 6 | 6^{2} | [6]
(Chinese Taipei) I-h Cho (Chinese Taipei) Y-t Cho | 3 | 7^{7} | [10]
(Uzbekistan) P Kudermetova (Uzbekistan) M Timofeeva | 7^{7} | 6
4 | (Japan) E Hozumi (Slovenia) A Klepač | 6^{4} | 1
WC | (Indonesia) J Tjen (United States) V Williams | 6 | 6
(Ukraine) L Kichenok (Japan) M Ninomiya | 1 | 3

Semifinals
(Netherlands) I Haverlag (Kazakhstan) Z Kulambayeva | 3 | 1
(Chinese Taipei) I-h Cho (Chinese Taipei) Y-t Cho | 6 | 6
(Uzbekistan) P Kudermetova (Uzbekistan) M Timofeeva | 6 | 6^{8} | [10]
WC | (Indonesia) J Tjen (United States) V Williams | 4 | 7^{10} | [6]

Final
(Chinese Taipei) I-h Cho (Chinese Taipei) Y-t Cho | 5 | 6^{1}
(Uzbekistan) P Kudermetova (Uzbekistan) M Timofeeva | 7 | 7^{7}
