= 2025 ATV Tennis Open – Doubles =

Doubles
- 2025 ATV Tennis Open

Final
- Champions: (Chinese Taipei) Cho I-hsuan (Chinese Taipei) Cho Yi-tsen
- Runners-up: (Georgia (country)) Ekaterine Gorgodze (Latvia) Darja Semeņistaja
- Score: 4-6, 6-4, [10-6]

Events
| Singles | Doubles |
| ← 2024 · | ATV Tennis Open | · 2026 → |

Cho I-hsuan and Cho Yi-tsen won the title, defeating Ekaterine Gorgodze and Darja Semeņistaja in the final, 4-6, 6-4, [10-6].

Leonie Küng and Vasanti Shinde were the defending champions, but they chose to not compete this year.

== Seeds ==
1. (Brazil) Laura Pigossi / (Poland) Katarzyna Piter (quarterfinals)
2. (Japan) Momoko Kobori / (Japan) Ayano Shimizu (quarterfinals)

== Draw ==
=== Key ===
- Q = Qualifier
- WC = Wild card
- LL = Lucky loser
- Alt = Alternate
- ITF = ITF entry
- PR = Protected ranking
- SR = Special ranking
- SE = Special exempt
- JE = Junior exempt
- JR = Junior Accelerator Programme entrant
- CO = College Accelerator Programme entrant
- NG = Next Gen Accelerator Program entrant
- w/o = Walkover
- r = Retired
- d = Defaulted

=== Draw ===
Quarterfinals
1 | (Brazil) L Pigossi (Poland) K Piter | 6^{5} | 6 | [7]
(Chinese Taipei) I-h Cho (Chinese Taipei) Y-t Cho | 7^{7} | 1 | [10]
WC | (Italy) TC Grant (Italy) L Pigato | 6 | 6
(United States) R McAdoo (Greece) S Sakellaridi | 1 | 2
(Italy) N Brancaccio (Argentina) J Riera | 6 | 2 | [6]
(Italy) A Abbagnato; T Prozorova | 4 | 6 | [10]
(Georgia (country)) E Gorgodze (Latvia) D Semeņistaja | 6 | 7
2 | (Japan) M Kobori (Japan) A Shimizu | 2 | 5

Semifinals
(Chinese Taipei) I-h Cho (Chinese Taipei) Y-t Cho | 6 | 6
WC | (Italy) TC Grant (Italy) L Pigato | 2 | 1
(Italy) A Abbagnato; T Prozorova | 2 | 4
(Georgia (country)) E Gorgodze (Latvia) D Semeņistaja | 6 | 6

Final
(Chinese Taipei) I-h Cho (Chinese Taipei) Y-t Cho | 4 | 6 | [10]
(Georgia (country)) E Gorgodze (Latvia) D Semeņistaja | 6 | 4 | [6]
