= 2025 ATV Tennis Open – Singles =

Singles
- 2025 ATV Tennis Open

Final
- Champion: (Croatia) Petra Marčinko
- Runner-up: Oksana Selekhmeteva
- Score: 6–3, 4–6, 6–3

Events
Singles	Doubles
- ATV Tennis Open

Petra Marčinko won the title, defeating defending champion Oksana Selekhmeteva in the final, 6–3, 4–6, 6–3.

== Seeds ==
1. (United States) Varvara Lepchenko (quarterfinals)
2. (Latvia) Darja Semeņistaja (semifinals)
3. Oksana Selekhmeteva (final)
4. Tatiana Prozorova (second round)
5. (Liechtenstein) Kathinka von Deichmann (first round)
6. (Czech Republic) Dominika Šalková (first round)
7. (Serbia) Lola Radivojević (second round)
8. (Belgium) Hanne Vandewinkel (first round)

== Draw ==
Key

- Q = Qualifier
- WC = Wild card
- LL = Lucky loser
- Alt = Alternate
- ITF = ITF entry
- PR = Protected ranking
- SR = Special ranking
- SE = Special exempt
- JE = Junior exempt
- JR = Junior Accelerator Programme entrant
- CO = College Accelerator Programme entrant
- NG = Next Gen Accelerator Program entrant
- w/o = Walkover
- r = Retired
- d = Defaulted

=== Finals ===
Semifinals
(Croatia) Petra Marčinko	6	6
(Slovenia) Tamara Zidanšek	1	2
3	Oksana Selekhmeteva	6	6
2	(Latvia) Darja Semeņistaja	4	4

Final
(Croatia) Petra Marčinko	6	4	6
3	Oksana Selekhmeteva	3	6	3

=== Top half ===
First round
1	(United States) V Lepchenko	3	6	6
(Italy) G Pedone	6	1	3
WC	(Italy) A Zantedeschi	6	3	1^{r}
LL	(France) A Ramé	4	6	1
(Brazil) L Pigossi	1	1
(North Macedonia) L Gjorcheska	6	6
(Croatia) P Marčinko	6	6
6	(Czech Republic) D Šalková	4	3
4	T Prozorova	6	6
(Argentina) J Ortenzi	3	4
WC	(Italy) D Spiteri	6	6
(Croatia) L Bošković	1	0
(Spain) Á Fita Boluda	5	3
(Argentina) J Riera	7	6
(Slovenia) T Zidanšek	6	6
8	(Belgium) H Vandewinkel	2	2

Second round
1	(United States) V Lepchenko	6	6
LL	(France) A Ramé	2	4
(North Macedonia) L Gjorcheska	2	4
(Croatia) P Marčinko	6	6
4	T Prozorova	7^{7}	5	2
WC	(Italy) D Spiteri	6^{5}	7	6
(Argentina) J Riera	6^{5}	6	2
(Slovenia) T Zidanšek	7^{7}	2	6

Quarterfinals
1	(United States) V Lepchenko	2	0
(Croatia) P Marčinko	6	6
WC	(Italy) D Spiteri	2	1
(Slovenia) T Zidanšek	6	6

Semifinals
(Croatia) P Marčinko	6	6
(Slovenia) T Zidanšek	1	2

=== Bottom half ===
First round
7	(Serbia) L Radivojević	6	4	6
(Czech Republic) B Palicová	4	6	1
(Switzerland) S Bandecchi	6	6^{2}	3
WC	A Oktiabreva	2	7^{7}	6
Q	(United States) C Liu	7	7^{7}
WC	(Italy) L Pigato	5	6^{5}
(Spain) K Quevedo	6^{3}	4
3	O Selekhmeteva	7^{7}	6
5	(Liechtenstein) K von Deichmann	4	2
(Georgia (country)) E Gorgodze	6	6
Q	(Switzerland) Y In-Albon	6	4	4
Q	(Italy) TC Grant	4	6	6
(Italy) N Brancaccio	3	6	1
(Italy) M Trevisan	6	3	6
Q	(France) A Hesse	3	2
2	(Latvia) D Semeņistaja	6	6

Second round
7	(Serbia) L Radivojević	6	2	6^{6}
WC	A Oktiabreva	2	6	7^{8}
Q	(United States) C Liu	3	2
3	O Selekhmeteva	6	6
(Georgia (country)) E Gorgodze	7^{7}	4	1
Q	(Italy) TC Grant	6^{5}	6	6
(Italy) M Trevisan	1	1
2	(Latvia) D Semeņistaja	6	6

Quarterfinals
WC	A Oktiabreva	6	4	3
3	O Selekhmeteva	3	6	6
Q	(Italy) TC Grant	2	5
2	(Latvia) D Semeņistaja	6	7

Semifinals
3	O Selekhmeteva	6	6
2	(Latvia) D Semeņistaja	4	4

== Qualifying ==
=== Seeds ===
1. (Italy) Tyra Caterina Grant (qualified)
2. (France) Alice Ramé (qualifying competition, lucky loser)
3. (Switzerland) Ylena In-Albon (qualified)
4. (France) Amandine Hesse (qualified)

=== Qualifiers ===
1. (Italy) Tyra Caterina Grant
2. (United States) Claire Liu
3. (Switzerland) Ylena In-Albon
4. (France) Amandine Hesse

=== Lucky losers ===
1. (Greece) Sapfo Sakellaridi (withdrew)
2. (France) Alice Ramé

=== Qualifying draw ===
==== First qualifier ====
Qualifying competition
1	(Italy) Tyra Caterina Grant	4	6	6
WC	(Italy) Angelica Raggi	6	0	3

==== Second qualifier ====
Qualifying competition
2	(France) Alice Ramé	5	6	1
	(United States) Claire Liu	7	4	6

==== Third qualifier ====
Qualifying competition
3	(Switzerland) Ylena In-Albon	6	6
WC	(Italy) Anastasia Abbagnato	1	1

==== Fourth qualifier ====
Qualifying competition
4	(France) Amandine Hesse	6	6
	(Greece) Sapfo Sakellaridi	1	3
