= 2026 Emilia-Romagna Open – Men's doubles =

Men's doubles
- 2026 Emilia-Romagna Open

Final
- Champions: (Switzerland) Jakub Paul (United States) Ryan Seggerman
- Runners-up: (Thailand) Pruchya Isaro (India) Niki Kaliyanda Poonacha
- Score: 6–2, 7–6^{(7–5)}

Events
Singles	men	women
Doubles	men	women
- Emilia-Romagna Open

Matthew Romios and Ryan Seggerman were the defending champions but only Seggerman chose to defend his title, partnering Jakub Paul. He successfully defended his title after defeating Pruchya Isaro and Niki Kaliyanda Poonacha 6–2, 7–6^{(7–5)} in the final.

== Seeds ==
1. (Switzerland) Jakub Paul / (United States) Ryan Seggerman (champions)
2. (United States) George Goldhoff / (Canada) Cleeve Harper (first round)
3. (United States) Nathaniel Lammons / (United States) Jackson Withrow (semifinals)
4. (Germany) Tim Rühl / (Netherlands) Mick Veldheer (semifinals)

== Draw ==
Key

- Q = Qualifier
- WC = Wild card
- LL = Lucky loser
- Alt = Alternate
- ITF = ITF entry
- PR = Protected ranking
- SR = Special ranking
- SE = Special exempt
- JE = Junior exempt
- JR = Junior Accelerator Programme entrant
- CO = College Accelerator Programme entrant
- NG = Next Gen Accelerator Program entrant
- w/o = Walkover
- r = Retired
- d = Defaulted

First round
1	(Switzerland) J Paul (United States) R Seggerman	5	6	[10]
(Italy) S Travaglia (Chinese Taipei) C-h Tseng	7	3	[5]
Alt	(Italy) Lorenzo Bocchi (Italy) Alexander Weis	4	5
Alt	(Colombia) DE Galán (Colombia) Miguel Tobón	6	7
4	(Germany) T Rühl (Netherlands) M Veldheer	2	6	[10]
(Spain) B Pujol Navarro (Spain) D Vega Hernández	6	4	[8]
WC	(Italy) F Passaro (Italy) J Vasamì	3	6	[8]
WC	(Italy) F Bondioli (Italy) CA Caniato	6	3	[10]
(Chinese Taipei) J Jung (Japan) K Uesugi	6	3	[10]
(Romania) A Jecan (Romania) B Pavel	4	6	[3]
PR	(India) A Kalyanpur (Australia) J Taylor	4	4
3	(United States) N Lammons (United States) J Withrow	6	6
PR	(Tunisia) S Mansouri (Austria) M Neuchrist	1	6^{3}
(India) A Kadhe (Brazil) M Zormann	6	7^{7}
(Thailand) P Isaro (India) N Kaliyanda Poonacha	7^{9}	3	[11]
2	(United States) G Goldhoff (Canada) C Harper	6^{7}	6	[9]

Quarterfinals
1	(Switzerland) J Paul (United States) R Seggerman	w/o
Alt	(Colombia) DE Galán (Colombia) M Tobón
4	(Germany) T Rühl (Netherlands) M Veldheer	6	4	[10]
WC	(Italy) F Bondioli (Italy) CA Caniato	2	6	[4]
(Chinese Taipei) J Jung (Japan) K Uesugi	6	6^{2}	[8]
3	(United States) N Lammons (United States) J Withrow	2	7^{7}	[10]
(India) A Kadhe (Brazil) M Zormann	6^{5}	3
(Thailand) P Isaro (India) N Kaliyanda Poonacha	7^{7}	6

Semifinals
1	(Switzerland) J Paul (United States) R Seggerman	6	6
4	(Germany) T Rühl (Netherlands) M Veldheer	2	2
3	(United States) N Lammons (United States) J Withrow	2	5
(Thailand) P Isaro (India) N Kaliyanda Poonacha	6	7

Final
1	(Switzerland) J Paul (United States) R Seggerman	6	7^{7}
(Thailand) P Isaro (India) N Kaliyanda Poonacha	2	6^{5}
