= 2026 Open delle Puglie – Singles =

Singles
- 2026 Open delle Puglie

Final
- Champion: (Spain) Leyre Romero Gormaz
- Runner-up: (Italy) Tyra Caterina Grant
- Score: 7–5, 0–6, 6–2

Details
- Draw: 32 (4 WC)
- Seeds: 8

Events
Singles	Doubles
- Open delle Puglie

Leyre Romero Gormaz won the title, defeating Tyra Caterina Grant 7–5, 0–6, 6–2 in the final.

Anca Todoni was the two-time defending champion, but did not participate this year.

== Seeds ==
1. (Egypt) Mayar Sherif (second round)
2. (Italy) Lisa Pigato (second round)
3. (Belgium) Sofia Costoulas (second round, retired)
4. (Spain) Leyre Romero Gormaz (champion)
5. (Italy) Nuria Brancaccio (first round)
6. (Greece) Despina Papamichail (first round)
7. (United States) Varvara Lepchenko (second round)
8. (Italy) Lucia Bronzetti (semifinals)

== Draw ==
Key

- Q = Qualifier
- WC = Wild card
- LL = Lucky loser
- Alt = Alternate
- ITF = ITF entry
- PR = Protected ranking
- SR = Special ranking
- SE = Special exempt
- JE = Junior exempt
- JR = Junior Accelerator Programme entrant
- CO = College Accelerator Programme entrant
- NG = Next Gen Accelerator Program entrant
- w/o = Walkover
- r = Retired
- d = Defaulted

=== Finals ===
Semifinals
8	(Italy) Lucia Bronzetti	4	1
4	(Spain) Leyre Romero Gormaz	6	6
WC	(Italy) Tyra Caterina Grant	6	6
Darya Astakhova	2	3

Final
4	(Spain) Leyre Romero Gormaz	7	0	6
WC	(Italy) Tyra Caterina Grant	5	6	2

=== Top half ===
First round
1	(Egypt) M Sherif	6	6
(Spain) C Martínez Círez	0	3
(Italy) G Pedone	6	6
(Georgia (country)) E Gorgodze	3	3
WC	(Italy) L Mair	2	6	6
Q	(China) Y Dang	6	4	3
WC	(Italy) V Paganetti	1	0
8	(Italy) L Bronzetti	6	6
4	(Spain) L Romero Gormaz	6	6^{7}	6
(China) X You	1	7^{9}	0
(Italy) M Tona	3	2
Q	(Italy) V Turini	6	6
(France) A Tubello	3	2
(France) C Monnet	6	6
T Prozorova	6	6
5	(Italy) N Brancaccio	4	0

Second round
1	(Egypt) M Sherif	6	4	3
(Italy) G Pedone	2	6	6
WC	(Italy) L Mair	2	1
8	(Italy) L Bronzetti	6	6
4	(Spain) L Romero Gormaz	6	6
Q	(Italy) V Turini	4	4
(France) C Monnet	1	6	6
T Prozorova	6	4	3

Quarterfinals
(Italy) G Pedone	2	4
8	(Italy) L Bronzetti	6	6
4	(Spain) L Romero Gormaz	1	6	6
(France) C Monnet	6	2	1

Semifinals
8	(Italy) L Bronzetti	4	1
4	(Spain) L Romero Gormaz	6	6

=== Bottom half ===
First round
7/WC	(United States) V Lepchenko	5	6	6
I Shymanovich	7	3	1
(Sweden) L Zaar	6	3	3
WC	(Italy) TC Grant	3	6	6
(Italy) T Pieri	6	2	6
(Argentina) V Bosio	0	6	2
(Greece) S Sakellaridi	4	6	3
3	(Belgium) S Costoulas	6	2	6
6	(Greece) D Papamichail	5	3
(France) C Paquet	7	6
Q	(Romania) A Prisăcariu	6	2	2
Q	(Slovenia) N Radišić	2	6	6
(China) X Gao	4	1
D Astakhova	6	6
(Bulgaria) E Yaneva	6^{5}	1
2	(Italy) L Pigato	7^{7}	6

Second round
7/WC	(United States) V Lepchenko	6^{3}	6	2
WC	(Italy) TC Grant	7^{7}	2	6
(Italy) T Pieri	1	2
3	(Belgium) S Costoulas	6	3^{r}
(France) C Paquet	6	6
Q	(Slovenia) N Radišić	3	3
D Astakhova	6	2	6
2	(Italy) L Pigato	3	6	3

Quarterfinals
WC	(Italy) TC Grant	6	6
(Italy) T Pieri	4	1
(France) C Paquet	5	3
D Astakhova	7	6

Semifinals
WC	(Italy) TC Grant	6	6
D Astakhova	2	3

== Qualifying ==
=== Seeds ===
1. (Romania) Andreea Prisăcariu (qualified)
2. (Spain) Lucía Cortez Llorca (qualifying competition)
3. Maria Kozyreva (qualifying competition)
4. (China) Dang Yiming (qualified)

=== Qualifiers ===
1. (Romania) Andreea Prisăcariu
2. (Italy) Viola Turini
3. (Slovenia) Nika Radišić
4. (China) Dang Yiming

=== Qualifying draw ===
==== First qualifier ====
Qualifying competition
1	(Romania) Andreea Prisăcariu	6	6
	(Italy) Francesca Dell'Edera	3	2

==== Second qualifier ====
Qualifying competition
2	(Spain) Lucía Cortez Llorca	6	2	2
	(Italy) Viola Turini	3	6	6

==== Third qualifier ====
Qualifying competition
3	Maria Kozyreva	2	4
	(Slovenia) Nika Radišić	6	6

==== Fourth qualifier ====
Qualifying competition
4	(China) Dang Yiming	4	7	6
	(Italy) Eleonora Alvisi	6	5	2
