= 2026 Open delle Puglie – Doubles =

Doubles
- 2026 Open delle Puglie

Final
- Champions: (Chinese Taipei) Cho I-hsuan (Chinese Taipei) Cho Yi-tsen
- Runners-up: (France) Estelle Cascino (Slovenia) Nika Radišić
- Score: 4–6, 6–3, [10–4]

Events
Singles	Doubles
- Open delle Puglie

Maria Kozyreva and Iryna Shymanovich were the defending champions, but lost in the semifinals to Estelle Cascino and Nika Radišić.

Cho I-hsuan and Cho Yi-tsen won the title, defeating Cascino and Radišić 4–6, 6–3, [10–4] in the final.

== Seeds ==
1. Maria Kozyreva / Iryna Shymanovich (semifinals)
2. (Chinese Taipei) Cho I-hsuan / (Chinese Taipei) Cho Yi-tsen (champions)

== Draw ==
Key

- Q = Qualifier
- WC = Wild card
- LL = Lucky loser
- Alt = Alternate
- ITF = ITF entry
- PR = Protected ranking
- SR = Special ranking
- SE = Special exempt
- JE = Junior exempt
- JR = Junior Accelerator Programme entrant
- CO = College Accelerator Programme entrant
- NG = Next Gen Accelerator Program entrant
- w/o = Walkover
- r = Retired
- d = Defaulted

=== Draw ===
Quarterfinals
1	M Kozyreva; I Shymanovich	5	6	[10]
Alt	(China) Y Dang (China) X You	7	1	[6]
(France) E Cascino (Slovenia) N Radišić	5
(Georgia (country)) E Gorgodze (France) C Monnet	4^{r}
WC	(Italy) E Alvisi (Italy) N Brancaccio	1	4
(United States) R McAdoo (Greece) S Sakellaridi	6	6
(Italy) L Bronzetti (Italy) L Pigato	3	7	[2]
2	(Chinese Taipei) I-h Cho (Chinese Taipei) Y-t Cho	6	5	[10]

Semifinals
1	M Kozyreva; I Shymanovich	5	4
(France) E Cascino (Slovenia) N Radišić	7	6
(United States) R McAdoo (Greece) S Sakellaridi	4	6^{3}
2	(Chinese Taipei) I-h Cho (Chinese Taipei) Y-t Cho	6	7^{7}

Final
(France) E Cascino (Slovenia) N Radišić	6	3	[4]
2	(Chinese Taipei) I-h Cho (Chinese Taipei) Y-t Cho	4	6	[10]
