= 2026 Emilia-Romagna Open – Men's singles =

Men's singles
- 2026 Emilia-Romagna Open

Final
- Champion: (France) Luca Van Assche
- Runner-up: (Austria) Sebastian Ofner
- Score: 2–6, 6–2, 6–3

Events
Singles	men	women
Doubles	men	women
- Emilia-Romagna Open

Carlos Taberner was the defending champion but chose not to defend his title.

Luca Van Assche won the title after defeating Sebastian Ofner 2–6, 6–2, 6–3 in the final.

== Seeds ==
1. (Netherlands) Jesper de Jong (first round)
2. (France) Luca Van Assche (champion)
3. (Bosnia and Herzegovina) Damir Džumhur (first round)
4. (Austria) Sebastian Ofner (final)
5. (Italy) Stefano Travaglia (second round)
6. (Spain) Pedro Martínez (first round)
7. (Italy) Francesco Passaro (first round)
8. (Italy) Marco Cecchinato (quarterfinals)

== Draw ==
Key

- Q = Qualifier
- WC = Wild card
- LL = Lucky loser
- Alt = Alternate
- ITF = ITF entry
- PR = Protected ranking
- SR = Special ranking
- SE = Special exempt
- JE = Junior exempt
- JR = Junior Accelerator Programme entrant
- CO = College Accelerator Programme entrant
- NG = Next Gen Accelerator Program entrant
- w/o = Walkover
- r = Retired
- d = Defaulted

=== Finals ===
Semifinals
(Serbia) Laslo Djere	6^{4}	7^{7}	3
4	(Austria) Sebastian Ofner	7^{7}	6^{5}	6
Alt	(Spain) Daniel Rincón	3	0
2	(France) Luca Van Assche	6	6

Final
4	(Austria) Sebastian Ofner	6	2	3
2	(France) Luca Van Assche	2	6	6

=== Top half ===
First round
1	(Netherlands) J de Jong	3	5
(Serbia) L Djere	6	7
Q	(Germany) Luca Wiedenmann	2	1
Q	(United States) R Seggerman	6	6
(Chinese Taipei) C-h Tseng	6	6
Q	(Italy) Juan Cruz Martin Manzano	4	0
Q	(Spain) O Roca Batalla	6	6
7	(Italy) F Passaro	4	0
4	(Austria) S Ofner	6	6
(Italy) R Brancaccio	3	4
Q	(Italy) E Dalla Valle	6	6
Q	(Italy) Alexander Weis	2	3
(Spain) M Damas	2	3
(Spain) R Carballés Baena	6	6
Alt	P Bar Biryukov	6^{5}	3
5	(Italy) S Travaglia	7^{7}	6

Second round
(Serbia) L Djere	4	6	7^{7}
Q	(United States) R Seggerman	6	1	6^{4}
(Chinese Taipei) C-h Tseng	6	7^{7}
Q	(Spain) O Roca Batalla	2	6^{1}
4	(Austria) S Ofner	6	7
Q	(Italy) E Dalla Valle	2	5
(Spain) R Carballés Baena	6	6^{5}	6
5	(Italy) S Travaglia	1	7^{7}	3

Quarterfinals
(Serbia) L Djere	6	4	6
(Chinese Taipei) C-h Tseng	3	6	4
4	(Austria) S Ofner	4	6	6
(Spain) R Carballés Baena	6	3	3

Semifinals
(Serbia) L Djere	6^{4}	7^{7}	3
4	(Austria) S Ofner	7^{7}	6^{5}	6

=== Bottom half ===
First round
6	(Spain) P Martínez	6^{5}	6^{5}
Alt	(Spain) D Rincón	7^{7}	7^{7}
(Italy) F Agamenone	3	6	6^{7}
(Italy) S Napolitano	6	3	7^{9}
I Simakin	3	4
WC	(Italy) J Vasamì	6	6
(Belgium) B Gadamauri	6	6
3	(Bosnia and Herzegovina) D Džumhur	4	4
8	(Italy) M Cecchinato	4	6	6
WC	(Italy) CA Caniato	6	3	4
(Ecuador) Á Guillén Meza	7	5	6^{4}
WC	(Italy) F Bondioli	5	7	7^{7}
(Colombia) DE Galán	6	3	6
(Hungary) Z Piros	2	6	3
(Spain) N Sánchez Izquierdo	3	6	3
2	(France) L Van Assche	6	3	6

Second round
Alt	(Spain) D Rincón	6	3
(Italy) S Napolitano	2	1^{r}
WC	(Italy) J Vasamì	4	6^{1}
(Belgium) B Gadamauri	6	7^{7}
8	(Italy) M Cecchinato	6	6
WC	(Italy) F Bondioli	2	3
(Colombia) DE Galán	1	3
2	(France) L Van Assche	6	6

Quarterfinals
Alt	(Spain) D Rincón	6^{3}	6	6
(Belgium) B Gadamauri	7^{7}	3	1
8	(Italy) M Cecchinato	6	0	1
2	(France) L Van Assche	3	6	6

Semifinals
Alt	(Spain) D Rincón	3	0
2	(France) L Van Assche	6	6
