= 2026 Emilia-Romagna Open – Women's doubles =

Women's doubles
- 2026 Emilia-Romagna Open

Final
- Champions: (Chinese Taipei) Cho I-hsuan (Chinese Taipei) Cho Yi-tsen
- Runners-up: (Italy) Marta Lombardini (Italy) Federica Urgesi
- Score: 6–2, 6–2

Events
Singles	men	women
Doubles	men	women
- Emilia-Romagna Open

Jesika Malečková and Miriam Škoch were the reigning champions, but did not participate this year as they were still playing in Rome.

Cho I-hsuan and Cho Yi-tsen won the title, defeating Marta Lombardini and Federica Urgesi 6–2, 6–2 in the final.

== Seeds ==
All seeds received a bye into the quarterfinals.

1. (Czech Republic) Anastasia Dețiuc / (China) Tang Qianhui (semifinals)
2. (France) Estelle Cascino / (China) Feng Shuo (quarterfinals)
3. (Chinese Taipei) Cho I-hsuan / (Chinese Taipei) Cho Yi-tsen (champions)
4. (United Kingdom) Madeleine Brooks / (France) Elixane Lechemia (quarterfinals)

== Draw ==
Key

- Q = Qualifier
- WC = Wild card
- LL = Lucky loser
- Alt = Alternate
- ITF = ITF entry
- PR = Protected ranking
- SR = Special ranking
- SE = Special exempt
- JE = Junior exempt
- JR = Junior Accelerator Programme entrant
- CO = College Accelerator Programme entrant
- NG = Next Gen Accelerator Program entrant
- w/o = Walkover
- r = Retired
- d = Defaulted

=== Draw ===
First round
(Romania) O Gavrilă (Greece) S Sakellaridi	6	6
WC	(Italy) E Bocchi (Italy) C Montenet	3	3
(Italy) D Chiesa (Italy) A Moratelli	2	0
(Hong Kong) E Chong (Japan) M Uchijima	6	6
(Germany) L Böhner (Croatia) M Dražić	1	4
(Italy) M Lombardini (Italy) F Urgesi	6	6
(Argentina) N Fossa Huergo (Kazakhstan) Z Kulambayeva	6	5	[10]
(France) C Monnet (India) P Thombare	3	7	[5]

Quarterfinals
1	(Czech Republic) A Dețiuc (China) Q Tang	6^{4}	7	[10]
(Romania) O Gavrilă (Greece) S Sakellaridi	7^{7}	5	[3]
3	(Chinese Taipei) I-h Cho (Chinese Taipei) Y-t Cho	6	6
(Hong Kong) E Chong (Japan) M Uchijima	2	4
(Italy) M Lombardini (Italy) F Urgesi	7^{7}	6
4	(United Kingdom) M Brooks (France) E Lechemia	6^{1}	2
(Argentina) N Fossa Huergo (Kazakhstan) Z Kulambayeva	7^{7}	2	[10]
2	(France) E Cascino (China) S Feng	6^{2}	6	[5]

Semifinals
1	(Czech Republic) A Dețiuc (China) Q Tang	6	3	[6]
3	(Chinese Taipei) I-h Cho (Chinese Taipei) Y-t Cho	4	6	[10]
(Italy) M Lombardini (Italy) F Urgesi	6	6
(Argentina) N Fossa Huergo (Kazakhstan) Z Kulambayeva	2	4

Final
3	(Chinese Taipei) I-h Cho (Chinese Taipei) Y-t Cho	6	6
(Italy) M Lombardini (Italy) F Urgesi	2	2
