= 2026 Emilia-Romagna Open – Women's singles =

Tennis tournament

Women's singles
- 2026 Emilia-Romagna Open

Final
- Champion: (Ukraine) Dayana Yastremska
- Runner-up: (Czech Republic) Barbora Krejčíková
- Score: 6–3, 6–3

Details
- Draw: 32 (4 WC)
- Seeds: 8

Events
Singles	men	women
Doubles	men	women
- Emilia-Romagna Open

Mayar Sherif was the defending champion, but lost in the second round to Dominika Šalková.

Dayana Yastremska won the title, after defeating Barbora Krejčíková in the final, 6–3, 6–3.

== Seeds ==
1. (France) Loïs Boisson (first round)
2. (Spain) Jéssica Bouzas Maneiro (semifinals)
3. (Ukraine) Dayana Yastremska (champion)
4. (Czech Republic) Barbora Krejčíková (final)
5. (Argentina) Solana Sierra (quarterfinals)
6. (United States) Alycia Parks (second round)
7. (Colombia) Camila Osorio (semifinals)
8. (Switzerland) Viktorija Golubic (quarterfinals)

== Draw ==
Key

- Q = Qualifier
- WC = Wild card
- LL = Lucky loser
- Alt = Alternate
- ITF = ITF entry
- PR = Protected ranking
- SR = Special ranking
- SE = Special exempt
- JE = Junior exempt
- JR = Junior Accelerator Programme entrant
- CO = College Accelerator Programme entrant
- NG = Next Gen Accelerator Program entrant
- w/o = Walkover
- r = Retired
- d = Defaulted

=== Finals ===
Semifinals
7	(Colombia) Camila Osorio	2	6	5
4	(Czech Republic) Barbora Krejčíková	6	1	7
3/WC	(Ukraine) Dayana Yastremska	7^{7}	6^{4}	7^{7}
2	(Spain) Jéssica Bouzas Maneiro	6^{5}	7^{7}	6^{5}

Final
4	(Czech Republic) Barbora Krejčíková	3	3
3/WC	(Ukraine) Dayana Yastremska	6	6

=== Top half ===
First round
1	(France) L Boisson	7^{7}	1	2
(Czech Republic) D Šalková	6^{5}	6	6
(China) Y Yuan	4	6	4
(Egypt) M Sherif	6	0	6
(Italy) L Pigato	4	4
(Italy) L Bronzetti	6	6
Q	(Italy) D Chiesa	1	3
7	(Colombia) C Osorio	6	6
4	(Czech Republic) B Krejčíková	6	6
(Andorra) V Jiménez Kasintseva	4	1
Q	(Kazakhstan) Z Kulambayeva	1	4
(Germany) A-L Friedsam	6	6
WC	(Italy) F Urgesi	6	0
(Poland) M Chwalińska	3	0^{r}
(United States) V Lepchenko	6	1	4
8	(Switzerland) V Golubic	4	6	6

Second round
(Czech Republic) D Šalková	7^{7}	6
(Egypt) M Sherif	6^{4}	2
(Italy) L Bronzetti	1	6^{2}
7	(Colombia) C Osorio	6	7^{7}
4	(Czech Republic) B Krejčíková	6	6^{2}	6
(Germany) A-L Friedsam	2	7^{7}	2
WC	(Italy) F Urgesi	2	3
8	(Switzerland) V Golubic	6	6

Quarterfinals
(Czech Republic) D Šalková	1	6	3
7	(Colombia) C Osorio	6	2	6
4	(Czech Republic) B Krejčíková	6^{4}	6	6
8	(Switzerland) V Golubic	7^{7}	3	2

Semifinals
7	(Colombia) C Osorio	2	6	5
4	(Czech Republic) B Krejčíková	6	1	7

=== Bottom half ===
First round
5	(Argentina) S Sierra	6	6
(France) C Monnet	4	0
(Slovenia) K Juvan	7^{7}	3	6
(Japan) M Uchijima	6^{3}	6	0
(Belgium) H Vandewinkel	7	6
(United States) W Osuigwe	5	4
Q	(Argentina) V Bosio	6^{3}	3
3/WC	(Ukraine) D Yastremska	7^{7}	6
6	(United States) A Parks	7	6^{8}	6
(United States) M Stoiana	5	7^{10}	2
(Australia) P Hon	7^{7}	4	5
Q	(Switzerland) S Bandecchi	6^{5}	6	7
WC	(Italy) N Basiletti	4	2
(Austria) L Tagger	6	6
WC	(Italy) M Lombardini	4	2
2	(Spain) J Bouzas Maneiro	6	6

Second round
5	(Argentina) S Sierra	3	6	6
(Slovenia) K Juvan	6	2	2
(Belgium) H Vandewinkel	3	2
3/WC	(Ukraine) D Yastremska	6	6
6	(United States) A Parks	4	5
Q	(Switzerland) S Bandecchi	6	7
(Austria) L Tagger	3	2
2	(Spain) J Bouzas Maneiro	6	6

Quarterfinals
5	(Argentina) S Sierra	3	5
3/WC	(Ukraine) D Yastremska	6	7
Q	(Switzerland) S Bandecchi	1	6	4
2	(Spain) J Bouzas Maneiro	6	3	6

Semifinals
3/WC	(Ukraine) D Yastremska	7^{7}	6^{4}	7^{7}
2	(Spain) J Bouzas Maneiro	6^{5}	7^{7}	6^{5}

== Qualifying ==
=== Seeds ===
1. (Switzerland) Susan Bandecchi (qualified)
2. (Argentina) Victoria Bosio (qualified)
3. (Brazil) Gabriela Cé (qualifying competition)
4. (Kazakhstan) Zhibek Kulambayeva (qualified)

=== Qualifiers ===
1. (Switzerland) Susan Bandecchi
2. (Argentina) Victoria Bosio
3. (Italy) Deborah Chiesa
4. (Kazakhstan) Zhibek Kulambayeva

=== Qualifying draw ===
==== First qualifier ====
Qualifying competition
1	(Switzerland) Susan Bandecchi	7	6
	(Greece) Sapfo Sakellaridi	5	0

==== Second qualifier ====
Qualifying competition
2	(Argentina) Victoria Bosio	6	6
WC	(Italy) Elena Bocchi	2	4

==== Third qualifier ====
Qualifying competition
3	(Brazil) Gabriela Cé	0	6	4
	(Italy) Deborah Chiesa	6	3	6

==== Fourth qualifier ====
Qualifying competition
4	(Kazakhstan) Zhibek Kulambayeva	6	6
	(Argentina) Nicole Fossa Huergo	1	4
