= Harriet Dart =

British tennis player (born 1996)

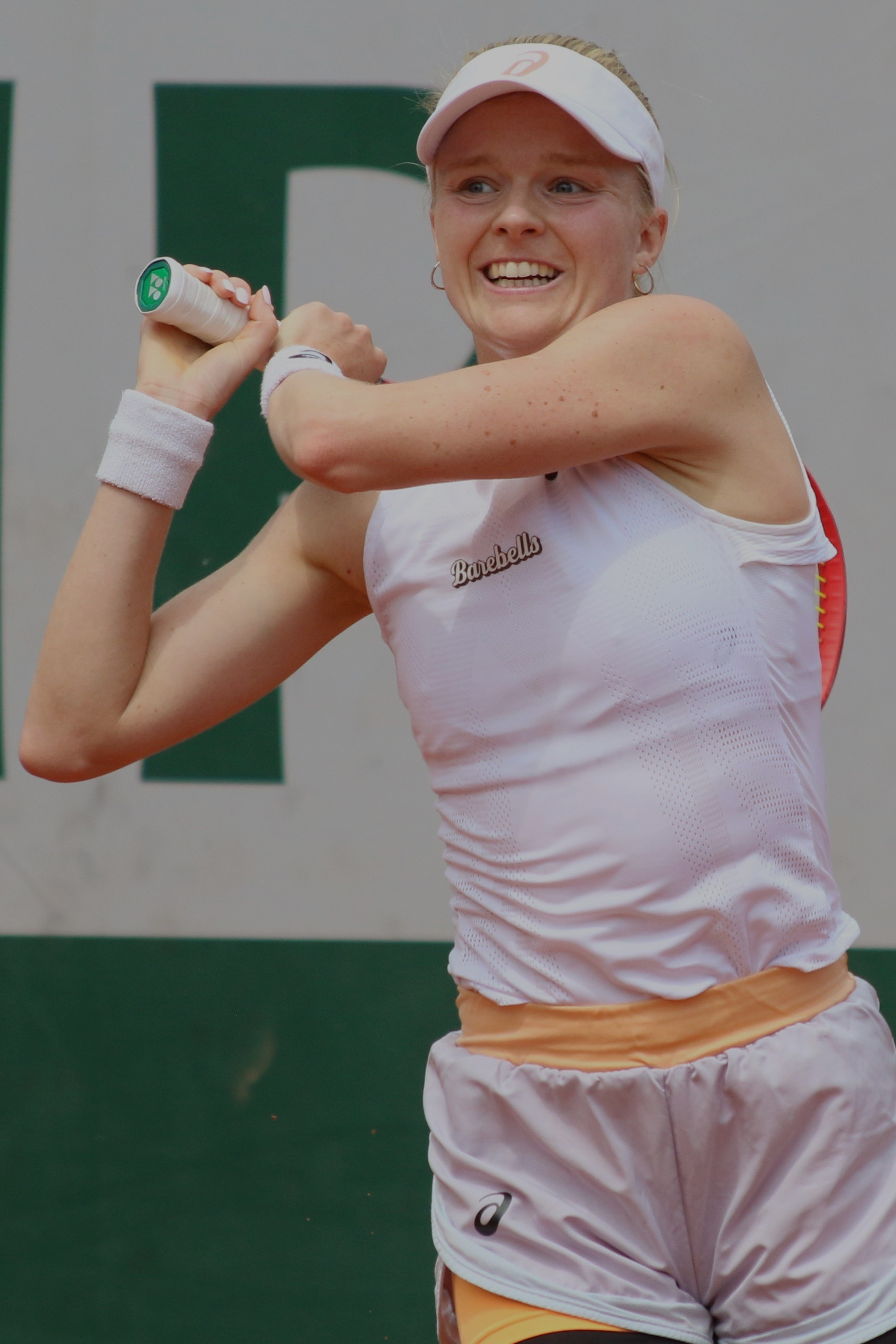
- Dart at the 2023 French Open
- Country (sports): Great Britain
- Residence: London, England
- Born: 28 July 1996 (age 30) Hampstead, London
- Height: 1.75 m (5 ft 9 in)
- Turned pro: 2015
- Plays: Right (two-handed backhand)
- Prize money: US$ 3,816,912

Singles
- Career record: 409–319
- Career titles: 1
- Highest ranking: No. 70 (9 September 2024)
- Current ranking: No. 84 (2 November 2026)

Grand Slam singles results
- Australian Open: 2R (2020, 2025)
- French Open: 1R (2022, 2024)
- Wimbledon: 3R (2019, 2024)
- US Open: 2R (2022, 2024, 2026)

Doubles
- Career record: 228–160
- Career titles: 2
- Highest ranking: No. 59 (14 October 2024)
- Current ranking: No. 83 (26 October 2026)

Grand Slam doubles results
- Australian Open: 2R (2019, 2025)
- French Open: 1R (2025, 2026)
- Wimbledon: 3R (2021, 2022)
- US Open: 3R (2024)

Grand Slam mixed doubles results
- Wimbledon: F (2021)

Team competitions
- BJK Cup: SF (2022, 2024), record 8–8
- Last updated on: 2 November 2026.

Harriet Dart (born 28 July 1996) is a British professional tennis player. She achieved a career-high singles ranking of world No. 70 on 9 September 2024, and a best doubles ranking of No. 59, on 14 October 2024.

Dart has won three WTA Tour titles, one in singles at the 2026 Guangzhou Open, and two in doubles at the 2026 Nottingham Open and the 2026 Prague Open. She also reached the final of the 2021 Wimbledon Championships in mixed doubles with Joe Salisbury. She is the current British No. 3 in women's singles.

== Personal life ==
Dart was born in Hampstead, London, and attended The Royal School. She started playing tennis aged seven.

== Career ==
=== 2015–2018: WTA Tour and major debuts ===
Dart was given a wildcard entry for her WTA Tour debut at the 2015 Eastbourne International, losing to Dominika Cibulková.

Again entering with a wildcard at the 2018 Eastbourne International, she defeated qualifier Kristýna Plíšková before losing to 11th seed Anastasija Sevastova in the second round.

Dart made her major main-draw debut at the 2018 Wimbledon Championships as a wildcard entrant, losing in the first round against former world No. 1 Karolina Plíšková in three sets.

=== 2019–20: Wimbledon third round, Fed Cup debut ===
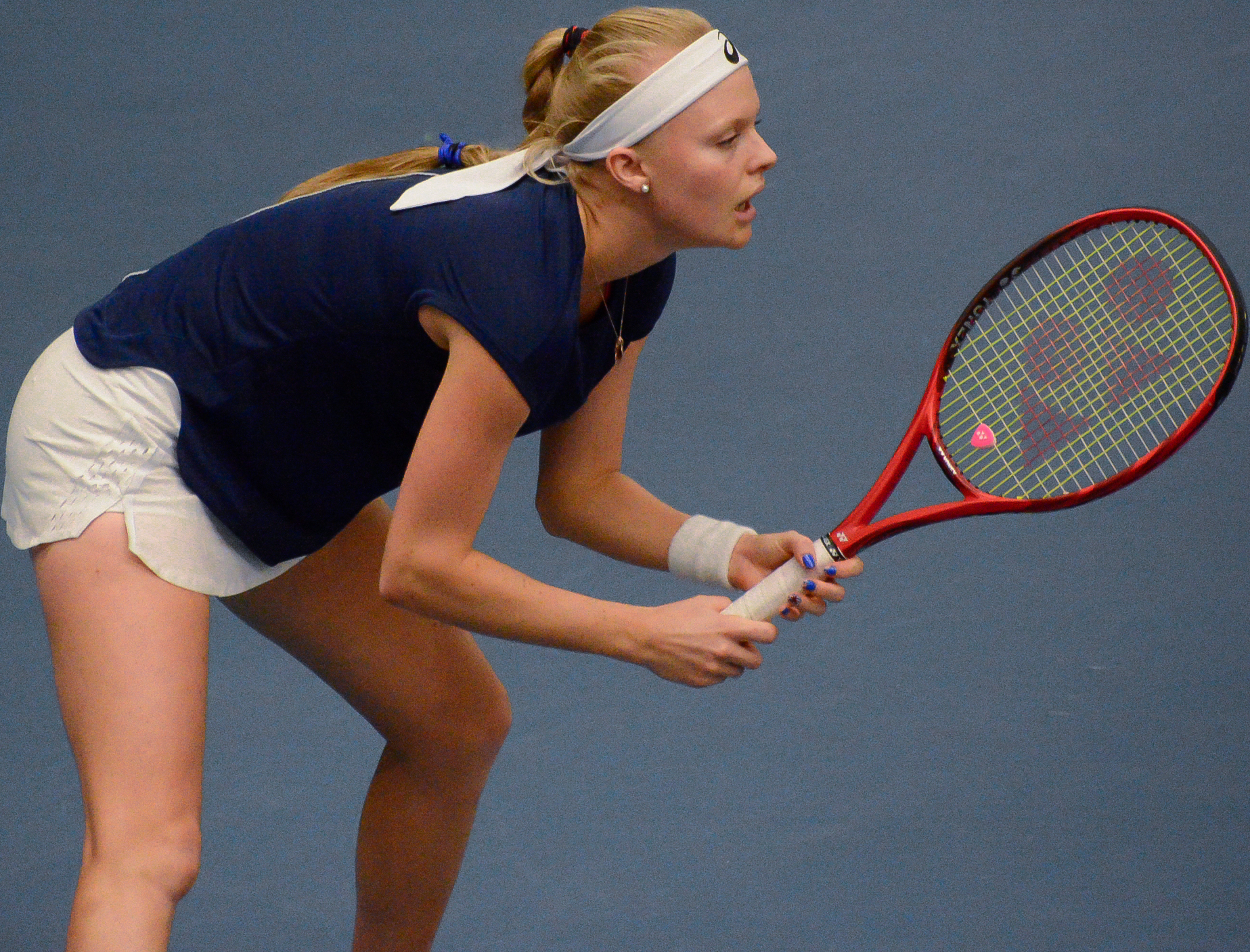
Dart representing Great Britain in a 2019 Fed Cup doubles rubber against Greece

At the 2019 Australian Open, Dart lost to Maria Sharapova in the first round without winning a single game.

In February 2019, she made her Fed Cup debut for Great Britain in the Europe/Africa Zone Group I in Bath against Slovenia, partnering Katie Swan to defeat Dalila Jakupović and Kaja Juvan in the doubles rubber. The pair also overcame Anna Arkadianou and Despina Papamichail.

At the 2019 Wimbledon Championships, Dart defeated Christina McHale and Beatriz Haddad Maia, progressing to the third round where she lost to Ashleigh Barty, only winning two games.

Dart qualified for the 2019 US Open to make her first time main-draw appearance at this major. She lost in the first round to Ana Bogdan in straight sets.

In February 2020, Dart made her Fed Cup singles debut in the qualifying round, losing to Viktória Kužmová and Anna Karolína Schmiedlová as her team were defeated 3–1 by Slovakia in Bratislava.

=== 2021: Wimbledon mixed doubles final ===
At Wimbledon, Dart reached her first major final, making the mixed doubles decider alongside partner Joe Salisbury, which they lost to Neal Skupski and Desirae Krawczyk.

Partnering with Asia Muhammad, she won her first WTA 125 doubles title at the Midland Tennis Classic, defeating Peangtarn Plipuech and Aldila Sutjiadi in the final.

=== 2022: WTA 1000 fourth round, top 100 ===
Dart came through qualifying at Indian Wells and went on to reach the last 16, including defeating Elina Svitolina for her first win over a top-20 player, before losing to Madison Keys. The points she gained took her into the top-100 of the rankings for the first time. After a lack of success on clay, Dart entered the Nottingham Open where she defeated Donna Vekić and third seed Camila Giorgi before losing her first WTA Tour quarterfinal to sixth seed Alison Riske. She then entered the Birmingham Classic and defeated Camila Osorio, before losing to Simona Halep. At the Eastbourne International, she defeated Madison Brengle, Jil Teichmann and Marta Kostyuk, before losing to Petra Kvitová in the quarterfinals. On 25 July, she rose to a new career-high of No. 84 in the WTA rankings.

At the US Open, she secured her first top-10 win, defeating Daria Kasatkina in the first round in three sets. She exited the tournament in the second round, losing to Dalma Gálfi in straight sets.

In November, Dart defeated world No. 13, Paula Badosa, to help Great Britain reach the semifinals of the Billie Jean King Cup. Despite Dart overcoming Ajla Tomljanović, Great Britain lost in the last four to Australia 2–1.

=== 2023: Back-to-back grass-court quarterfinals ===
In June, Dart reached successive WTA Tour quarterfinals, with runs to the last eight at the grass-court events in Nottingham, where she lost to eventual champion Katie Boulter, and Birmingham, when it was Anastasia Potapova who ended her challenge. However, she could not continue her good form on the lawns of Wimbledon later that month as she went out in the first round of her home Grand Slam losing in three sets to Diane Parry.

In November, Dart secured the winning point for Great Britain in their 3–1 Billie Jean King Cup play-off victory against Sweden at the Copper Box Arena in London with a straight sets win over Caijsa Hennemann, after being brought into the team as a late replacement for Jodie Burrage.

=== 2024: First WTA Tour semifinal ===
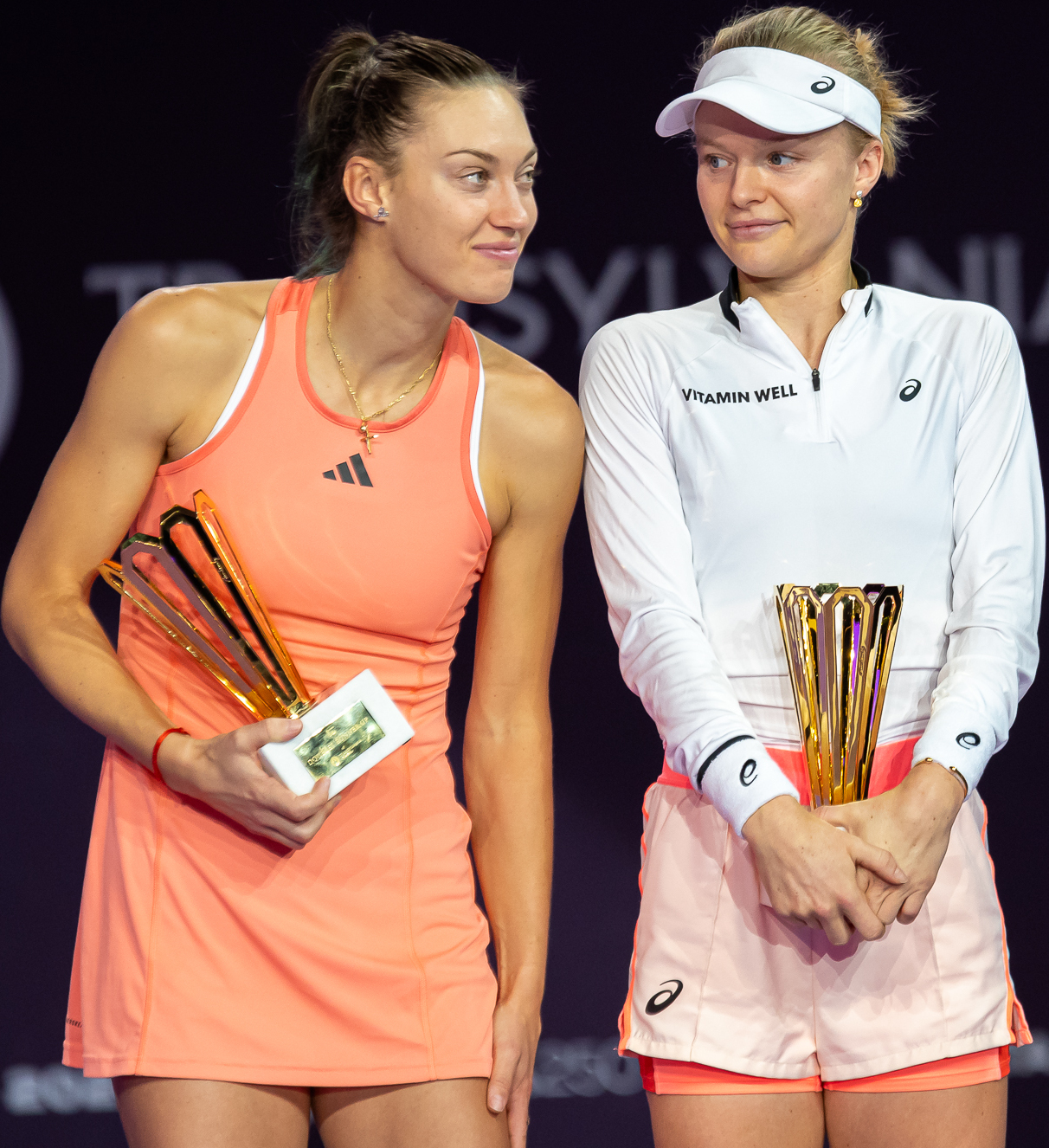
Dart with Tereza Mihalíková during the trophy ceremony at the 2024 Transylvania Open where she reached the final in doubles

Dart returned to the world's top 100, after reaching her first WTA singles semifinal at the Transylvania Open defeating lucky loser Anna Bondár, fifth seed Elisabetta Cocciaretto and Nuria Párrizas Díaz, before bowing out against eventual champion Karolína Plíšková. At the same event, she also made the doubles final with partner Tereza Mihalíková.

In April, Dart won two rounds in qualifying for the Madrid Open to reach the main draw, but lost to Cristina Bucșa in the first round.

Alongside Diane Parry, Dart was runner-up in the doubles at the Nottingham Open, losing to top seeds Gabriela Dabrowski and Erin Routliffe in the final. At the Eastbourne International, she reached the quarterfinals thanks to wins over Marie Bouzková and Sofia Kenin, before going down to a straight sets defeat against Leylah Fernandez.

Dart made it through to the third round at Wimbledon with victories over Bai Zhuoxuan and Katie Boulter, but then lost six games in a row from 3-0 ahead in the deciding set against Wang Xinyu to bring her run in the tournament to an end.

She retired due to cramp in her final qualifying match at the Canadian Open, but was given a place in the main draw as a lucky loser only to be defeated in the first round by 14th seed Diana Shnaider, in three sets.

Dart made it through qualifying at the Cincinnati Open, but lost in the first round to Yulia Putintseva. Playing with Ellen Perez, Dart reached the semifinals of the doubles recording a win over second seeds Hsieh Su-wei and Elise Mertens on the way to the last four where they lost to third seeds Asia Muhammad and Erin Routliffe. This was her first appearance in a WTA 1000 doubles semifinal.

Having gained automatic qualification into the main draw through her ranking, Dart defeated Chloé Paquet in the first round at the US Open, before losing to 19th seed Marta Kostyuk in round two. Despite the defeat, Dart moved into the top 70 in the singles rankings. Playing with Diane Parry in the doubles, she reached the round of 16 after a three set win over Olympic champions and sixth seeds, Sara Errani and Jasmine Paolini, in the second round. They lost to 10th seeds Chan Hao-ching and Veronika Kudermetova.

Dart reached the second round at the Japan Women's Open in October with a win over qualifier Laura Siegemund, before losing to Clara Tauson.

=== 2025: Second WTA 125 doubles title ===
Wins over Lizette Cabrera and Taylah Preston saw Dart reach the final round of qualifying at the Australian Open, where she lost to Nao Hibino. However, she was handed a reprieve and entered the main draw as a lucky loser following the withdrawal of Markéta Vondroušová and defeated Jana Fett in the first round. Dart lost in the second round to 18th seed Donna Vekić in three sets.

Partnering with Maia Lumsden, she reached the doubles semifinals at the Singapore Open. Given a wildcard into the main draw at Wimbledon, Dart lost to Dalma Gálfi in the first round.

In September, Dart won her second WTA 125 title, teaming with Maia Lumsden to claim the Caldas da Rainha Ladies Open, defeating Madeleine Brooks and Anastasia Tikhonova in the final. She also claimed her first singles title in two years at the W35 Monastir event, overcoming Alina Granwehr in the final in three sets.

The following month, Dart combined again with Lumsden to reach the final of the WTA 125 Samsun Open, losing to Naïma Karamoko and Tiantsoa Rakotomanga Rajaonah in a deciding champions tiebreak. In November, she won the biggest singles title of her career to date at the W75 Toronto Challenger, losing only one set throughout the entire tournament and defeating Fiona Crawley in the final, in straight sets.

=== 2026: Maiden WTA Tour singles & doubles titles ===
In April, Dart was part of the Great Britain team for their BJK Cup qualifier against Australia in Melbourne. She defeated Kimberly Birrell in three sets and then teamed up with Jodie Burrage to overcome Storm Hunter and Ellen Perez in the doubles to clinch the overall tie and secure Britain's progress to the finals.

Partnering with Lumsden, Dart reached the final at the WTA 125 Birmingham Open in June, losing to top seeds Talia Gibson and Janice Tjen. The following week at the Queen's Club Championships, she entered thanks to a wildcard and defeated world No. 35, Liudmila Samsonova, before being eliminated by lucky loser Kamilla Rakhimova in the second round. Again playing with Maia Lumsden, and entering as a wildcard team, Dart won her maiden WTA Tour title at the Nottingham Open, defeating second seeds Shuko Aoyama and Chan Hao-ching in the final. Given a wildcard entry into the singles draw at Wimbledon, she lost in the first round to Jeļena Ostapenko, in three sets.

Reunited with Maia Lumsden, Dart won her second WTA Tour doubles title at the Prague Open, defeating Lucie Havlíčková and Laura Samson in the final. In August, she qualified for the singles main draw at the WTA 1000 Cincinnati Open, but lost to Peyton Stearns in the first round.

Dart recorded three-set wins over teenage American wildcard entrants Jordyn Hazelitt and Kristina Penickova, and then fellow British player Heather Watson in qualifying to make it into the main-draw at the US Open. In the first round, she defeated Peyton Stearns to register her first singles main-draw win at a major since the 2025 Australian Open. However, Dart lost to 25th seed Marie Bouzková in the second round.

Having qualified for the main draw at the China Open, she overcame wildcard entrant Yihan Qu, before losing in the second round to 10th seed Iva Jovic, in three sets. Two weeks later Dart qualified for the main-draw at the Japan Open, but lost to fourth seed Talia Gibson in the first round. She also qualified for the main draw at the following week's Guangzhou Open, where she defeated fellow qualifier Tatiana Prozorova, second seed Janice Tjen and fifth seed Paula Badosa to make it into the semifinals. Dart faced wildcard entrant Sun Xinran in the last four and saved match points in the second set, before winning eight consecutive games to reach her first WTA Tour singles final. In the championship match, she again came back from a set down to defeat fourth seed Lilli Tagger and claim her maiden WTA Tour singles title at the age of 30. As a result, Dart climbed 31 places in the WTA singles rankings to return to the top 100 at world No. 84 on 2 November 2026.

== Performance timelines ==
Key
W	F	SF	QF	#R	RR	Q#	P#	DNQ	A	Z#	PO	G	S	B	NMS	NTI	P	NH

(W) winner; (F) finalist; (SF) semifinalist; (QF) quarterfinalist; (#R) rounds 4, 3, 2, 1; (RR) round-robin stage; (Q#) qualification round; (P#) preliminary round; (DNQ) did not qualify; (A) absent; (Z#) Davis/Fed Cup Zonal Group (with number indication) or (PO) play-off; (G) gold, (S) silver or (B) bronze Olympic/Paralympic medal; (NMS) not a Masters tournament; (NTI) not a Tier I tournament; (P) postponed; (NH) not held; (SR) strike rate (events won / competed); (W–L) win–loss record.
To avoid confusion and double counting, these charts are updated at the conclusion of a tournament or when the player's participation has ended.

Only main-draw results in WTA Tour, Grand Slam tournaments, Fed Cup/Billie Jean King Cup and Olympic Games are included in win–loss records.

=== Singles ===
Current through the 2026 Guangzhou Open.

Tournament	2015	2016	2017	2018	2019	2020	2021	2022	2023	2024	2025	2026	SR	W–L	Win %
Grand Slam tournaments
Australian Open	A	A	A	A	1R	2R	Q1	1R	1R	Q2	2R	Q2	0 / 5	2–5	29%
French Open	A	A	A	A	A	Q2	Q3	1R	Q2	1R	Q1	Q2	0 / 2	0–2	0%
Wimbledon	A	Q3	Q1	1R	3R	NH	1R	2R	1R	3R	1R	1R	0 / 8	5–8	38%
US Open	A	A	A	Q1	1R	A	1R	2R	Q2	2R	Q2	2R	0 / 5	3–5	38%
Win–loss	0–0	0–0	0–0	0–1	2–3	1–1	0–2	2–4	0–2	3–3	1–2	1–2	0 / 20	10–20	33%
National representation
Billie Jean King Cup (Note: Formerly known as Fed Cup until 2020.)	A	A	A	A	PO2	QR (Note: Edition is split into the two years due to COVID-19.)		SF	QR	SF		QR	0 / 2	4–6	40%
WTA 1000
Qatar Open (Note: The first Premier 5 event of the year has switched back and forth between the Dubai Tennis Championships and the Qatar Ladies Open since 2009. Dubai was classified as a Premier 5 event from 2009 to 2011 before being succeeded by Doha for the 2012–2014 period. In 2015, Dubai regained its Premier 5 status while Doha was demoted to Premier status. The Premier 5 tournaments were reclassified as WTA 1000 tournaments in 2021.)	NMS	A	NMS	A	NMS	A	NMS	Q1	NMS	A	A	A	0 / 0	0–0	–
Dubai	A	NMS	A	NMS	A	NMS	A	NMS	Q1	A	A	A	0 / 0	0–0	–
Indian Wells Open	A	A	A	A	A	NH	A	4R	Q1	Q2	A	A	0 / 1	3–1	75%
Miami Open	A	A	A	A	Q1	NH	Q2	Q1	Q2	Q2	Q2	A	0 / 0	0–0	–
Madrid Open	A	A	A	A	A	NH	A	Q1	A	1R	Q1	A	0 / 1	0–1	0%
Italian Open	A	A	A	A	A	A	A	A	Q1	Q1	Q1	A	0 / 0	0–0	–
Canadian Open	A	A	A	A	A	NH	2R	Q2	A	1R	A	Q1	0 / 2	1–2	33%
Cincinnati Open	A	A	A	A	A	A	A	Q1	A	1R	A	1R	0 / 2	0–2	0%
Guadalajara Open	NH							A	A	NMS	A	A	0 / 0	0–0	–
Wuhan Open	A	A	A	A	A	NH				Q1	A	A	0 / 0	0–0	–
China Open	A	A	A	A	A	NH			A	1R	A	2R	0 / 2	1–2	33%
Win–Loss	0–0	0–0	0–0	0–0	0–0	0–0	1–1	3–1	0–0	0–4	0–0	1–2	0 / 8	5–8	38%
Career statistics
	2015	2016	2017	2018	2019	2020	2021	2022	2023	2024	2025	2026	SR	W–L	Win %
Tournaments	1	0	1	4	10	1	10	15	10	13	8	10	Career total: 83		
Titles	0	0	0	0	0	0	0	0	0	0	0	1	Career total: 1		
Finals	0	0	0	0	0	0	0	0	0	0	0	1	Career total: 1		
Overall win–loss	0–1	0–0	0–1	1–4	4–10	1–3	4–10	17–17	8–14	10–13	1–8	9–9	1 / 83	55–90	38%
Year-end ranking (Note: 2012: WTA ranking–942, 2013: WTA ranking–1019, 2014: WTA ranking–532.)	385	338	315	153	142	150	120	98	138	88	176		$3,816,912		

=== Doubles ===
Tournament	2015	2016	2017	2018	2019	2020	2021	2022	2023	2024	SR	W–L
Australian Open	A	A	A	A	2R	A	A	A	A	A	0 / 1	1–1
French Open	A	A	A	A	A	A	A	A	A	A	0 / 0	0–0
Wimbledon	Q1	Q1	1R	2R	1R	NH	3R	3R	2R	1R	0 / 7	6–7
US Open	A	A	A	A	A	A	1R	1R	A	3R	0 / 3	2–3
Win–Loss	0–0	0–0	0–1	1–1	1–2	0–0	2–2	2–2	1–1	2–2	0 / 11	9–11
Career statistics
Year-end ranking	348	403	302	113	161	177	164	120	156	61		

== Grand Slam tournament finals ==
=== Mixed doubles: 1 (runner-up) ===
Result	Year	Tournament	Surface	Partner	Opponents	Score
Loss	2021	Wimbledon	Grass	(United Kingdom) Joe Salisbury	(United States) Desirae Krawczyk (United Kingdom) Neal Skupski	2–6, 6–7^{(1–7)}

== WTA Tour finals ==
=== Singles: 1 (title) ===
Legend WTA 250 (1–0)	Finals by surface Hard (1–0)	Finals by setting Outdoor (1–0)

Result	W–L	Date	Tournament	Tier	Surface	Opponents	Score
Win	1–0	Nov 2026	Guangzhou Open, China	WTA 250	Hard	(Austria) Lilli Tagger	4–6, 6–3, 6–4

=== Doubles: 6 (2 titles, 4 runner-ups) ===
Legend WTA 500 (–) WTA 250 (2–4)	Finals by surface Hard (1–2) Grass (1–2)	Finals by setting Outdoor (2–3) Indoor (0–1)

Result	W–L	Date	Tournament	Tier	Surface	Partner	Opponents	Score
Loss	0–1	Aug 2022	Championnats de Granby, Canada	WTA 250	Hard	(Netherlands) Rosalie van der Hoek	(United Kingdom) Alicia Barnett (United Kingdom) Olivia Nicholls	7–5, 3–6, [1–10]
Loss	0–2	Jun 2023	Nottingham Open, UK	WTA 250	Grass	(United Kingdom) Heather Watson	(Norway) Ulrikke Eikeri (Estonia) Ingrid Neel	6–7^{(6–8)}, 7–5, [8–10]
Loss	0–3	Feb 2024	Transylvania Open, Romania	WTA 250	Hard (i)	(Slovakia) Tereza Mihalíková	(United States) Caty McNally (United States) Asia Muhammad	3–6, 4–6
Loss	0–4	Jun 2024	Nottingham Open, UK	WTA 250	Grass	(France) Diane Parry	(Canada) Gabriela Dabrowski (New Zealand) Erin Routliffe	7–5, 3–6, [9–11]
Win	1–4	Jun 2026	Nottingham Open, UK	WTA 250	Grass	(United Kingdom) Maia Lumsden	(Chinese Taipei) Chan Hao-ching (Japan) Shuko Aoyama	6–3, 6–4
Win	2–4	Jul 2026	Prague Open, Czech Republic	WTA 250	Hard	(United Kingdom) Maia Lumsden	(Czech Republic) Lucie Havlíčková (Czech Republic) Laura Samson	6–4, 6–4

== WTA 125 finals ==
=== Singles: 1 (runner-up) ===
Result	W–L	Date	Tournament	Surface	Opponent	Score
Loss	0–1	Jan 2024	Canberra International, Australia	Hard	(Spain) Nuria Párrizas Díaz	4–6, 3–6

=== Doubles: 5 (2 titles, 3 runner-ups) ===
Result	W–L	Date	Tournament	Surface	Partner	Opponents	Score
Win	1–0	Nov 2021	Midland Tennis Classic, United States	Hard (i)	(United States) Asia Muhammad	(Thailand) Peangtarn Plipuech (Indonesia) Aldila Sutjiadi	6–3, 2–6, [10–7]
Loss	1–1	Apr 2024	Oeiras Ladies Open, Portugal	Clay	(France) Kristina Mladenovic	(Portugal) Francisca Jorge (Portugal) Matilde Jorge	0–6, 4–6
Win	2–1	Sep 2025	Caldas da Rainha Open, Portugal	Hard	(United Kingdom) Maia Lumsden	(United Kingdom) Madeleine Brooks (Russia) Anastasia Tikhonova	6–0, 6–3
Loss	2–2	Oct 2025	Samsun Open, Turkiye	Hard	(United Kingdom) Maia Lumsden	(Switzerland) Naïma Karamoko (France) Tiantsoa Rakotomanga Rajaonah	5–7, 6–1, [6–10]
Loss	2–3	Jun 2026	Birmingham Open, United Kingdom	Grass	(United Kingdom) Maia Lumsden	(Australia) Talia Gibson (Indonesia) Janice Tjen	4–6, 3–6

== ITF Circuit finals ==
=== Singles: 20 (7 titles, 13 runner-ups) ===
Legend W100 tournaments (0–2) W80 tournaments (0–1) W75 tournaments (1–2) W40 tournaments (0–1) W25/35 tournaments (4–4) $10,000 tournaments (2–3)	Finals by surface Hard (6–13) Carpet (1–0)

Result	W–L	Date	Tournament	Tier	Surface	Opponent	Score
Loss	0–1	Nov 2012	ITF Edgbaston, United Kingdom	10,000	Hard (i)	(Czech Republic) Renata Voráčová	4–6, 2–6
Loss	0–2	Aug 2014	ITF Sharm El Sheikh, Egypt	10,000	Hard	(Ukraine) Valeriya Strakhova	3–6, 3–6
Win	1–2	Oct 2014	ITF Sharm El Sheikh, Egypt	10,000	Hard	(Spain) Nuria Párrizas Díaz	6–2, 6–1
Win	2–2	Dec 2014	ITF Djibouti City, Djibouti	10,000	Hard	(Hungary) Naomi Totka	6–3, 6–2
Loss	2–3	Mar 2015	ITF Jiangmen, China	10,000	Hard	(China) Liu Chang	3–6, 0–6
Loss	2–4	May 2016	ITF Goyang, South Korea	25,000	Hard	(South Korea) Han Na-lae	3–6, 2–6
Win	3–4	Feb 2018	AK Ladies Open, Germany	25,000	Carpet (i)	(Czech Republic) Karolína Muchová	7–6^{(7–5)}, 6–2
Loss	3–5	Mar 2018	Yokohama Challenger, Japan	25,000	Hard	(Russia) Veronika Kudermetova	2–6, 4–6
Win	4–5	Oct 2018	ITF Oslo, Norway	25,000	Hard (i)	(Spain) Paula Badosa	6–2, 1–0 ret.
Loss	4–6	Apr 2019	ITF Sunderland, United Kingdom	W25	Hard (i)	(Romania) Laura Ioana Andrei	5–7, 6–4, 2–6
Loss	4–7	Oct 2020	ITF Cherbourg-en-Cotentin, France	W25	Hard (i)	(Estonia) Kaia Kanepi	4–6, 4–6
Loss	4–8	Oct 2021	Tyler Pro Challenge, United States	W80	Hard	(Japan) Misaki Doi	6–7^{(5–7)}, 2–6
Win	5–8	May 2023	ITF Nottingham, United Kingdom	W25	Hard	(Australia) Taylah Preston	6–0, 6–2
Loss	5–9	Oct 2023	ITF Quinta do Lago, Portugal	W40	Hard	(Czech Republic) Gabriela Knutson	4–6, 1–6
Loss	5–10	Nov 2023	Takasaki Open, Japan	W100	Hard	(China) Yuan Yue	7–5, 5–7, 0–6
Loss	5-11	Mar 2025	Porto Women's Indoor, Portugal	W75	Hard (i)	(Canada) Victoria Mboko	1–6, 1–6
Win	6-11	Sep 2025	ITF Monastir, Tunisia	W35	Hard	(Switzerland) Alina Granwehr	6–1, 3–6, 6–2
Win	7-11	Oct 2025	Toronto Challenger, Canada	W75	Hard (i)	(United States) Fiona Crawley	6–2, 6–2
Loss	7–12	Jan 2026	ITF Fujairah Championships, U.A.E.	W100	Hard	(Austria) Lilli Tagger	4–6, 2–6
Loss	7–13	Feb 2026	Porto Women's Indoor, Portugal	W75	Hard (i)	(Netherlands) Anouk Koevermans	2–6, 0–1 ret.

=== Doubles: 33 (18 titles, 15 runner-ups) ===
Legend W100 tournaments (3–0) W60 tournaments (3–2) W40 tournaments (1–0) W25 tournaments (4–5) $10/15,000 tournaments (7–8)	Finals by surface Hard (18–14) Clay (0–1)

Result	W–L	Date	Tournament	Tier	Surface	Partner	Opponents	Score
Win	1–0	Dec 2013	ITF Sharm El Sheikh, Egypt	10,000	Hard	(United Kingdom) Katy Dunne	(Hungary) Csilla Borsányi (Russia) Aminat Kushkhova	0–6, 6–4, [10–4]
Loss	1–1	Dec 2013	ITF Sharm El Sheikh, Egypt	10,000	Hard	(United Kingdom) Katy Dunne	(South Korea) Kim Hae-sung (South Korea) Kim Ju-eun	6–7^{(6)}, 4–6
Win	2–1	Apr 2014	ITF Sharm El Sheikh, Egypt	10,000	Hard	(United Kingdom) Katy Dunne	(Japan) Yuka Mori (United Kingdom) Eden Silva	6–4, 6–4
Loss	2–2	Aug 2014	ITF Sharm El Sheikh, Egypt	10,000	Hard	(New Zealand) Claudia Williams	(Serbia) Vojislava Lukić (Japan) Haine Ogata	4–6, 2–6
Win	3–2	Aug 2014	ITF Sharm El Sheikh, Egypt	10,000	Hard	(Russia) Anna Morgina	(Australia) Abbie Myers (Australia) Georgiana Ruhrig	6–2, 6–1
Loss	3–3	Sep 2014	ITF Antalya, Turkey	10,000	Hard	(United Kingdom) Jessica Simpson	(China) Wang Yan (China) You Xiaodi	1–6, 6–3, [8–10]
Win	4–3	Oct 2014	ITF Sharm El Sheikh, Egypt	10,000	Hard	(Turkey) Melis Sezer	(Romania) Ioana Ducu (United Kingdom) Eden Silva	7–5, 6–1
Loss	4–4	Oct 2014	ITF Sharm El Sheikh, Egypt	10,000	Hard	(United Kingdom) Eden Silva	(India) Sharmada Balu (China) Wang Xiyao	5–7, 6–2, [9–11]
Loss	4–5	Nov 2014	ITF Sousse, Tunisia	10,000	Hard	(United Kingdom) Francesca Stephenson	(Russia) Natela Dzalamidze (Ukraine) Oleksandra Korashvili	3–6, 1–6
Win	5–5	May 2015	ITF Balikpapan, Indonesia	25,000	Hard	(India) Prarthana Thombare	(Thailand) Nicha Lertpitaksinchai (Thailand) Nudnida Luangnam	6–4, 4–6, [18–16]
Win	6–5	Aug 2015	ITF Chiswick, United Kingdom	10,000	Hard	(United Kingdom) Katy Dunne	(United Kingdom) Emily Arbuthnott (United Kingdom) Freya Christie	6–2, 6–2
Loss	6–6	Aug 2015	ITF Woking, United Kingdom	25,000	Hard	(United Kingdom) Katy Dunne	(Italy) Claudia Giovine (Greece) Despina Papamichail	2–6, 1–6
Loss	6–7	Sep 2015	ITF Pétange, Luxembourg	15,000	Hard (i)	(France) Manon Arcangioli	(Belgium) Michaela Boev (Germany) Hristina Dishkova	2–6, 3–6
Loss	6–8	Feb 2016	ITF Sunderland, UK	10,000	Hard (i)	(France) Manon Arcangioli	(United Kingdom) Emily Arbuthnott (Denmark) Emilie Francati	3–6, 6–4, [5–10]
Loss	6–9	Feb 2016	ITF Wirral, UK	10,000	Hard (i)	(United States) Veronica Corning	(United Kingdom) Sarah Beth Askew (United Kingdom) Olivia Nicholls	2–6, 6–1, [8–10]
Win	7–9	Apr 2016	ITF Antalya, Turkey	10,000	Hard	(Bulgaria) Viktoriya Tomova	(Armenia) Ani Amiraghyan (Romania) Daiana Negreanu	w/o
Win	8–9	Apr 2016	ITF Antalya, Turkey	10,000	Hard	(United Kingdom) Emily Arbuthnott	(Russia) Anastasia Gasanova (Georgia (country)) Ana Shanidze	6–1, 6–0
Win	9–9	May 2016	ITF Goyang, South Korea	25,000	Hard	(United Kingdom) Freya Christie	(Russia) Anastasia Gasanova (Australia) Maddison Inglis	6–3, 6–2
Loss	9–10	Sep 2017	ITF Redding, US	25,000	Hard	(United States) Maria Sanchez	(United Kingdom) Daneika Borthwick (Montenegro) Ana Veselinović	3–6, 4–6
Loss	9–11	Sep 2017	ITF Stillwater, US	25,000	Hard	(Belgium) An-Sophie Mestach	(Serbia) Jovana Jakšić (United States) Caitlin Whoriskey	6–4, 4–6, [3–10]
Win	10–11	Nov 2017	GB Pro-Series Shrewsbury, UK	25,000	Hard (i)	(United Kingdom) Freya Christie	(United Kingdom) Maia Lumsden (United Kingdom) Katie Swan	3–6, 6–4, [10–6]
Win	11–11	Apr 2018	ITF Istanbul, Turkey	60,000	Hard	(Turkey) Ayla Aksu	(Russia) Anastasia Potapova (Russia) Olga Doroshina	6–4, 7–6^{(3)}
Win	12–11	May 2018	Jin'an Open, China	60,000	Hard	(India) Ankita Raina	(China) Liu Fangzhou (China) Xun Fangying	6–3, 6–3
Win	13–11	Oct 2018	ITF Oslo, Norway	25,000	Hard (i)	(Sweden) Cornelia Lister	(Romania) Laura Ioana Andrei (Belgium) Hélène Scholsen	7–6^{(3)}, 7–5
Win	14–11	Mar 2019	Open de Seine-et-Marne, France	W60	Hard (i)	(Netherlands) Lesley Kerkhove	(United Kingdom) Sarah Beth Grey (United Kingdom) Eden Silva	6–3, 6–2
Loss	14–12	Oct 2020	ITF Cherbourg-en-Contentin, France	W25	Hard (i)	(United Kingdom) Sarah Beth Grey	(United States) Robin Anderson (France) Jessika Ponchet	6–4, 4–6, [8–10]
Loss	14–13	Oct 2020	ITF Reims, France	W25	Hard (i)	(United Kingdom) Sarah Beth Grey	(France) Séléna Janicijevic (United States) Robin Montgomery	w/o
Loss	14–14	Mar 2022	Arcadia Women's Open, US	W60	Hard	(Mexico) Giuliana Olmos	(United States) Ashlyn Krueger (United States) Robin Montgomery	w/o
Win	15–14	Mar 2023	ITF Murska Sobota, Slovenia	W40	Hard	(Romania) Andreea Mitu	(Belgium) Magali Kempen (Switzerland) Xenia Knoll	w/o
Loss	15–15	May 2023	ITF Bodrum, Turkey	W60	Hard	(Turkey) Ayla Aksu	(Romania) Oana Gavrilă (Netherlands) Isabelle Haverlag	4–6, 6–7^{(3)}
Win	16–15	Oct 2023	GB Pro-Series Shrewsbury, UK	W100	Hard (i)	(Australia) Olivia Gadecki	(Estonia) Elena Malõgina (Czech Republic) Barbora Palicová	6–0, 6–2
Win	17–15	Jan 2026	ITF Fujairah Championships, UAE	W100	Hard	(United Kingdom) Maia Lumsden	(Netherlands) Isabelle Haverlag; Elena Pridankina	6–1, 6–0
Win	18–15	May 2026	Kangaroo Cup Gifu, Japan	W100	Hard	(United Kingdom) Heather Watson	(United States) Catherine Harrison (United States) Dalayna Hewitt	3–6, 6–3, [10–4]

== Team competitions ==
=== Fed Cup/Billie Jean King Cup ===
==== Singles (2–3) ====
Edition	Round	Date	Location	Against	Surface	Opponent	W/L	Result
2020-21	QR	Feb 2020	Bratislava (SVK)	Slovakia	Clay (i)	Viktória Kužmová	L	7–6^{(3)}, 3–6, 5–7
2020-21	QR	Feb 2020	Bratislava (SVK)	Slovakia	Clay (i)	Anna Karolína Schmiedlová	L	5–7, 3–6
2022	QR	Apr 2022	Prague (CZE)	Czech Republic	Clay	Markéta Vondroušová	L	0–6, 1–6
2022	QR	Apr 2022	Prague (CZE)	Czech Republic	Clay	Linda Fruhvirtová	W	6–0, 5–7, 6–2
2023	PO	Nov 2023	London (GBR)	Sweden	Hard (i)	Caijsa Hennemann	W	7–5, 6–2

==== Doubles (2–1) ====
Edition	Round	Date	Location	Against	Surface	Partner	Opponents	W/L	Result
2019	Z1 RR	Feb 2019	Bath (GBR)	Slovenia	Hard (i)	Katie Swan	Dalila Jakupović; Kaja Juvan	W	6–2, 6–2
2019	Z1 RR	Feb 2019	Bath (GBR)	Greece	Hard (i)	Katie Swan	Anna Arkadianou; Despina Papamichail	W	6–1, 6–4
2022	QR	Apr 2022	Prague (CZE)	Czech Republic	Clay	Katie Swan	Karolína Muchová; Markéta Vondroušová	L	1–6, 5–7

== Head-to-head record ==
=== Top 10 wins ===
Season	2022	Total
Wins	1	1

#	Player	Rank	Event	Surface	Rd	Score	HDR
2022
1.	(Russia) Daria Kasatkina	No. 9	US Open	Hard	1R	7–6^{(10–8)}, 1–6, 6–3	No. 88
