= Qu Yihan =

Chinese tennis player (born 2009)

- Country (sports): China
- Born: 22 March 2009 (age 17) Zhejiang, China
- Prize money: $14,272

Singles
- Career record: 6–13
- Career titles: 0
- Highest ranking: No. 1,289 (21 September 2026)
- Current ranking: No. 1,297 (28 September 2026)

Doubles
- Career record: 4–2
- Career titles: 0
- Highest ranking: No. 1,030 (21 September 2026)
- Current ranking: No. 1,046 (28 September 2026)
- Last updated on: 28 September 2026.

Qu Yihan (born 22 March 2009) is a Chinese tennis player. She has career high WTA rankings of No. 1,289 in singles and 1,030 in doubles, both achieved on 21 September 2026.

== Career ==
=== 2024–2025 WTA Tour qualifying draw debut ===
Qu was awarded a wildcard in the 2024 China Open qualifying draw but lost in the first round to top seed, Kamilla Rakhimova in straight sets. She was entered in the qualifying draw of the 2025 Ningbo Open as an alternate but again lost in the first round, this time to Tamara Korpatsch.

=== 2026: First senior title, WTA main-draw debut ===
Qu won her first title on the ITF Women's World Tennis Tour in June, partnering with Shao Yushan to win the doubles at a W35 event in Tauste, Spain. In September, she was awarded a wildcard in the China Open, marking her main-draw WTA Tour debut. She lost in the first round to qualifier Harriet Dart in three sets in a match that lasted three hours and three minutes.
