= Cho Yi-tsen =

Taiwanese tennis player (born 2001)

- Native name: 卓宜岑
- Country (sports): Chinese Taipei
- Residence: Taiwan
- Born: 4 May 2001 (age 25) Taiwan
- Plays: Right-handed
- Prize money: $78,325

Singles
- Career record: 83–80
- Highest ranking: No. 613 (23 October 2023)

Doubles
- Career record: 175–93
- Career titles: 3 WTA 125, 16 ITF Circuit
- Highest ranking: No. 94 (8 June 2026)
- Current ranking: No. 99 (27 July 2026)
- Last updated on: 3 August 2026.

Cho Yi-tsen (Chinese: 卓宜岑; born 4 May 2001) is a Taiwanese professional tennis player. On 8 June 2026, she peaked at No. 94 in the WTA doubles rankings. She has won three WTA 125 doubles titles and 17 doubles titles on the ITF World Tour. On 23 October 2023, Cho reached her career-high singles ranking of No. 613.

Teaming up with her sister Cho I-hsuan, she has won three WTA 125 doubles titles at the 2025 ATV Tennis Open, the 2026 Parma Ladies Open the 2026 Open delle Puglie.

== WTA Tour finals ==
=== Doubles: 1 (runner-up) ===
Legend WTA 250 (0–1)	Finals by surface Hard (0–1)	Finals by setting Outdoor (0–1)

Result	Date	Tournament	Tier	Surface	Partner	Opponents	Score
Loss	Oct 2026	Guangzhou Open, China	WTA 250	Hard	(Chinese Taipei) Cho I-hsuan	(Uzbekistan) Maria Timofeeva (Uzbekistan) Polina Kudermetova	5–7, 6–7^{(1)}

== WTA 125 finals ==
=== Doubles: 3 (3 titles) ===
Result	W–L	Date	Tournament	Surface	Partner	Opponents	Score
Win	1–0	Jul 2025	ATV Rome Open, Italy	Clay	(Chinese Taipei) Cho I-hsuan	(Georgia (country)) Ekaterine Gorgodze (Latvia) Darja Semeņistaja	4–6, 6–4, [10–6]
Win	2–0	May 2026	Parma Open, Italy	Clay	(Chinese Taipei) Cho I-hsuan	(Italy) Marta Lombardini (Italy) Federica Urgesi	6–2, 6–2
Win	3–0	Jun 2026	Foggia Open, Italy	Clay	(Chinese Taipei) Cho I-hsuan	(France) Estelle Cascino (Slovenia) Nika Radišić	4–6, 6–3, [10–4]

== ITF Circuit finals ==
=== Doubles: 34 (18 titles, 16 runner-ups) ===
Legend W100 tournaments W75 tournaments W40/50 tournaments W25/35 tournaments W15 tournaments	Finals by surface Hard (16–16) Clay (2–0)

Result	W–L	Date	Tournament	Tier	Surface	Partner	Opponents	Score
Win	1–0	Jun 2017	ITF Taipei, Taiwan	W15	Hard	(Chinese Taipei) Cho I-hsuan	(Hong Kong) Eudice Chong (Hong Kong) Katherine Ip	6–2, 6–3
Loss	1–1	Sep 2018	ITF Anning, China	W15	Hard	(Chinese Taipei) Cho I-hsuan	(India) Sowjanya Bavisetti (China) Wang Danni	6–7^{(4)}, 5–7
Loss	1–2	Sep 2018	ITF Anning, China	W15	Hard	(Chinese Taipei) Cho I-hsuan	(China) Sun Xuliu (China) Zhao Qianqian	4–6, 6–3, [6–10]
Loss	1–3	Aug 2019	ITF Taipei, Taiwan	W25	Hard	(Chinese Taipei) Cho I-hsuan	(India) Riya Bhatia (Japan) Ramu Ueda	5–7, 2–6
Win	2–3	Oct 2022	ITF Sharm El Sheikh, Egypt	W15	Hard	(Chinese Taipei) Cho I-hsuan	(Lithuania) Patricija Paukštytė (Estonia) Liisa Varul	6–0, 6–0
Loss	2–4	Oct 2022	ITF Sharm El Sheikh	W15	Hard	(Chinese Taipei) Cho I-hsuan	(Belgium) Tilwith di Girolami (Russia) Anastasiia Gureva	2–6, 6–4, [7–10]
Loss	2–5	Oct 2022	ITF Sharm El Sheikh	W15	Hard	(Chinese Taipei) Cho I-hsuan	(Russia) Anastasiia Gureva (Russia) Elena Pridankina	7–6^{(3)}, 1–6, [6–10]
Win	3–5	Nov 2022	ITF Sharm El Sheikh	W15	Hard	(Chinese Taipei) Cho I-hsuan	(China) Dong Na (Thailand) Mananchaya Sawangkaew	6–2, 7–6^{(4)}
Win	4–5	Nov 2022	ITF Sharm El Sheikh	W15	Hard	(Chinese Taipei) Cho I-hsuan	(Russia) Aliona Falei (Russia) Aglaya Fedorova	6–3, 3–6, [10–5]
Win	5–5	Dec 2022	ITF Sharm El Sheikh	W15	Hard	(Chinese Taipei) Cho I-hsuan	(Russia) Aglaya Fedorova (Russia) Elizaveta Masnaia	w/o
Win	6–5	Dec 2022	ITF Sharm El Sheikh	W15	Hard	(Chinese Taipei) Cho I-hsuan	(Kazakhstan) Zhanel Rustemova (Kazakhstan) Aruzhan Sagandikova	6–1, 6–0
Win	7–5	Mar 2023	ITF Jakarta, Indonesia	W15	Hard	(Chinese Taipei) Cho I-hsuan	(Belgium) Eliessa Vanlangendonck (Belgium) Amelia Waligora	5–7, 6–2, [10–4]
Loss	7–6	Jun 2023	ITF Changwon, Korea	W25	Hard	(Chinese Taipei) Cho I-hsuan	(China) Guo Hanyu (China) Jiang Xinyu	6–7^{(4)}, 6–7^{(1)}
Loss	7–7	Jun 2023	ITF Daegu, Korea	W25	Hard	(Chinese Taipei) Cho I-hsuan	(South Korea) Park So-hyun (Hong Kong) Cody Wong	6–4, 6-7^{(2)}, [12-14]
Loss	7–8	Aug 2023	ITF Nanchang, China	W40	Hard	(Chinese Taipei) Cho I-hsuan	(China) Feng Shuo (China) Zheng Wushuang	7–5, 6–7^{(8)}, [4–10]
Loss	7–9	Sep 2023	ITF Guiyang, China	W25	Hard	(Chinese Taipei) Cho I-hsuan	(China) Guo Hanyu (China) Jiang Xinyu	5–7, 4–6
Win	8–9	Oct 2023	ITF Shenzhen, China	W40	Hard	(Chinese Taipei) Cho I-hsuan	(China) Feng Shuo (China) Zheng Wushuang	7–5, 6–3
Win	9–9	Feb 2024	ITF Ipoh, Malaysia	W15	Hard	(Chinese Taipei) Cho I-hsuan	(China) Guo Meiqi (China) Xiao Zhenghua	6–4, 6–2
Win	10–9	Mar 2024	ITF Kuala Lumpur, Malaysia	W15	Hard	(Chinese Taipei) Cho I-hsuan	(Chinese Taipei) Lin Fang-an (China) Yuan Chengyiyi	6–3, 7–5
Win	11–9	Mar 2024	ITF Shenzhen, China	W50	Hard	(Chinese Taipei) Cho I-hsuan	(China) Feng Shuo (China) Wang Jiaqi	6–3, 6–4
Loss	11–10	Apr 2024	ITF Wuning, China	W50	Hard	(Chinese Taipei) Cho I-hsuan	(India) Rutuja Bhosale (New Zealand) Paige Hourigan	7–5, 6–7^{(5)}, [10–12]
Win	12–10	Jun 2024	ITF Taizhou, China	W50	Hard	(Chinese Taipei) Cho I-hsuan	(China) Wang Meiling (China) Yao Xinxin	2–6, 7–6^{(5)}, [10–7]
Win	13–10	Jun 2024	ITF Taipei, Taiwan	W35	Hard	(Chinese Taipei) Cho I-hsuan	(Chinese Taipei) Hsieh Yu-chieh (Chinese Taipei) Lin Fang-an	6–2, 1–6, [10–5]
Loss	13–11	Sep 2024	ITF Fuzhou, China	W50	Hard	(Chinese Taipei) Cho I-hsuan	(Chinese Taipei) Lee Ya-hsin (Chinese Taipei) Lin Fang-an	3–6, 4–6
Loss	13–12	Nov 2024	Yokohama Challenger, Japan	W50	Hard	(Chinese Taipei) Cho I-hsuan	(Japan) Momoko Kobori (Japan) Ayano Shimizu	4–6, 6–7^{(2)}
Loss	13–13	Jan 2025	ITF Nonthaburi, Thailand	W75	Hard	(Chinese Taipei) Cho I-hsuan	(United States) Maria Mateas (United States) Alana Smith	1–6, 3–6
Loss	13–14	Mar 2025	Porto Indoor, Portugal	W75	Hard (i)	(Chinese Taipei) Cho I-hsuan	(Portugal) Francisca Jorge (Portugal) Matilde Jorge	6–0, 6–7^{(4)}, [8–10]
Loss	13–15	Mar 2025	ITF Murska Sobota, Slovenia	W75	Hard (i)	(Chinese Taipei) Cho I-hsuan	(Croatia) Petra Marčinko (Croatia) Tara Würth	3–6, 6–3, [4–10]
Win	14–15	Jun 2025	Internazionali di Caserta, Italy	W75	Clay	(Chinese Taipei) Cho I-hsuan	(Spain) Ariana Geerlings (Japan) Wakana Sonobe	6–3, 7–6^{(5)}
Win	15–15	Jun 2025	Internationaux de Blois, France	W75	Clay	(Chinese Taipei) Cho I-hsuan	(Spain) Ángela Fita Boluda (Brazil) Laura Pigossi	7–5, 4–6, [10–5]
Win	16–15	Jan 2026	ITF Nonthaburi, Thailand	W75	Hard	(Chinese Taipei) Cho I-hsuan	(Chinese Taipei) Lee Ya-hsin (Hong Kong) Cody Wong	6–4, 6–7^{(3)}, [10–6]
Loss	16–16	Jan 2026	ITF Nonthaburi, Thailand	W75	Hard	(Chinese Taipei) Cho I-hsuan	(Hong Kong) Eudice Chong (Chinese Taipei) Liang En-shuo	7–5, 1–6, [8–10]
Win	17–16	Jul 2026	Evansville Classic, USA	W100	Hard	(Chinese Taipei) Cho I-hsuan	(Canada) Kayla Cross (United States) Anna Rogers	6–2, 6–3
Win	18–16	Aug 2026	Koser Jewelers Tennis Challenge, USA	W100	Hard	(Chinese Taipei) Cho I-hsuan	(United States) Savannah Broadus (United States) Kylie Collins	6–2, 6–4
