= Tyra Caterina Grant =

Italian tennis player (born 2008)

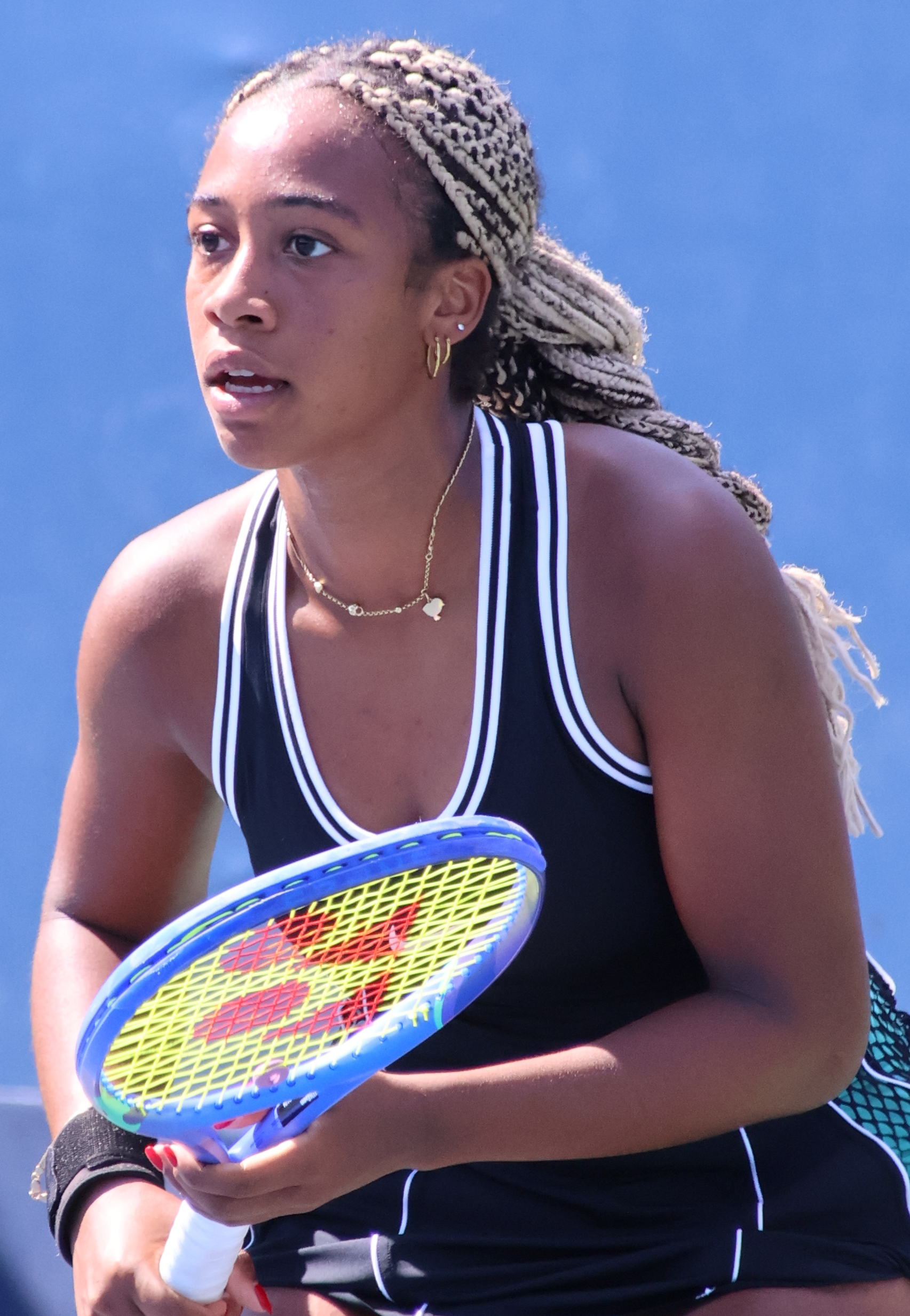
- Grant at the 2026 US Open
- Country (sports): Italy (May 2025–); (United States) USA (2021–2025)
- Born: March 12, 2008 (age 18) Rome, Italy
- Prize money: $500,876

Singles
- Career record: 85–47
- Career titles: 4 ITF
- Highest ranking: No. 141 (July 13, 2026)
- Current ranking: No. 158 (November 9, 2026)

Grand Slam singles results
- Wimbledon: 2R (2026)
- US Open: Q2 (2026)

Doubles
- Career record: 18–16
- Career titles: 2 ITF
- Highest ranking: No. 280 (August 25, 2025)
- Current ranking: No. 563 (November 9, 2026)

Grand Slam doubles results
- US Open: 1R (2024)

Grand Slam mixed doubles results
- US Open: SF (2024)

Team competitions
- BJK Cup: W (2025)
- Last updated on: November 10, 2026.

Tyra Caterina Grant (born March 12, 2008) is an Italian tennis player. She has a career-high singles ranking by the WTA of No. 141, achieved on 13 July 2026. She is a 2025 Billie Jean King Cup champion with Italy.

Grant achieved her first WTA 125 final at the 2026 Open delle Puglie in Foggia.

She won the girls' doubles titles at the 2023 French Open, 2024 Australian Open and the 2024 Wimbledon Championships, and she was a semifinalist in mixed doubles at the 2024 US Open. She is coached by Matteo Donati.

== Early life ==
Grant was born and raised in Rome, Italy, to Cinzia Giovinco, an Italian tennis coach, and Tyrone Grant, an African-American former professional basketball player who relocated to Italy to pursue his career. She has both Italian and American citizenship. She trained at the Piatti Tennis Center in Bordighera along with Jannik Sinner. Later, she moved to Orlando to train at the USTA National Campus. Her younger brother, Tyson, is also a tennis player. Her mother acts as her manager.

She began her junior career representing the United States but switched at 17 years old to represent Italy in May 2025, just a few days before making her debut as the official ambassador of the 2025 Italian Open in her hometown, Rome, where she also received a wildcard from the organizers.

== Career ==
=== Juniors ===
In December 2022, Grant partnered compatriot Iva Jovic to win the doubles title at the Orange Bowl in Plantation, Florida. At the age of 15, she won the girls' doubles title at the 2023 French Open with compatriot Clervie Ngounoue, defeating top seeds Alina Korneeva and Sara Saito in the final.

In 2024, she and Jovic won the girls' doubles title at the Australian Open. At the French Open, they reached the girls' doubles final, but lost to Renáta Jamrichová and Tereza Valentová. However, at Wimbledon, she and Jovic once again clinched the girls' doubles title, defeating Mika Stojsavljevic and Mingge Xu in the final.

=== Professional ===
In 2024, she received a wildcard into the qualifying competition of the US Open.

==== 2025: WTA Tour debut, BJK Cup win ====
She made her WTA Tour main-draw debut at her home-country WTA 1000 tournament, the 2025 Italian Open, where she lost to qualifier Antonia Ružić.

==== 2026: First tour win, top 200, first major main draw ====
In April 2026, at the Madrid Open, Grant recorded her first WTA Tour win defeating world No. 62, Elsa Jacquemot.

In May, after her win against Caroline Werner in Košice, Grant broke into the top 200 for the first time in her career.

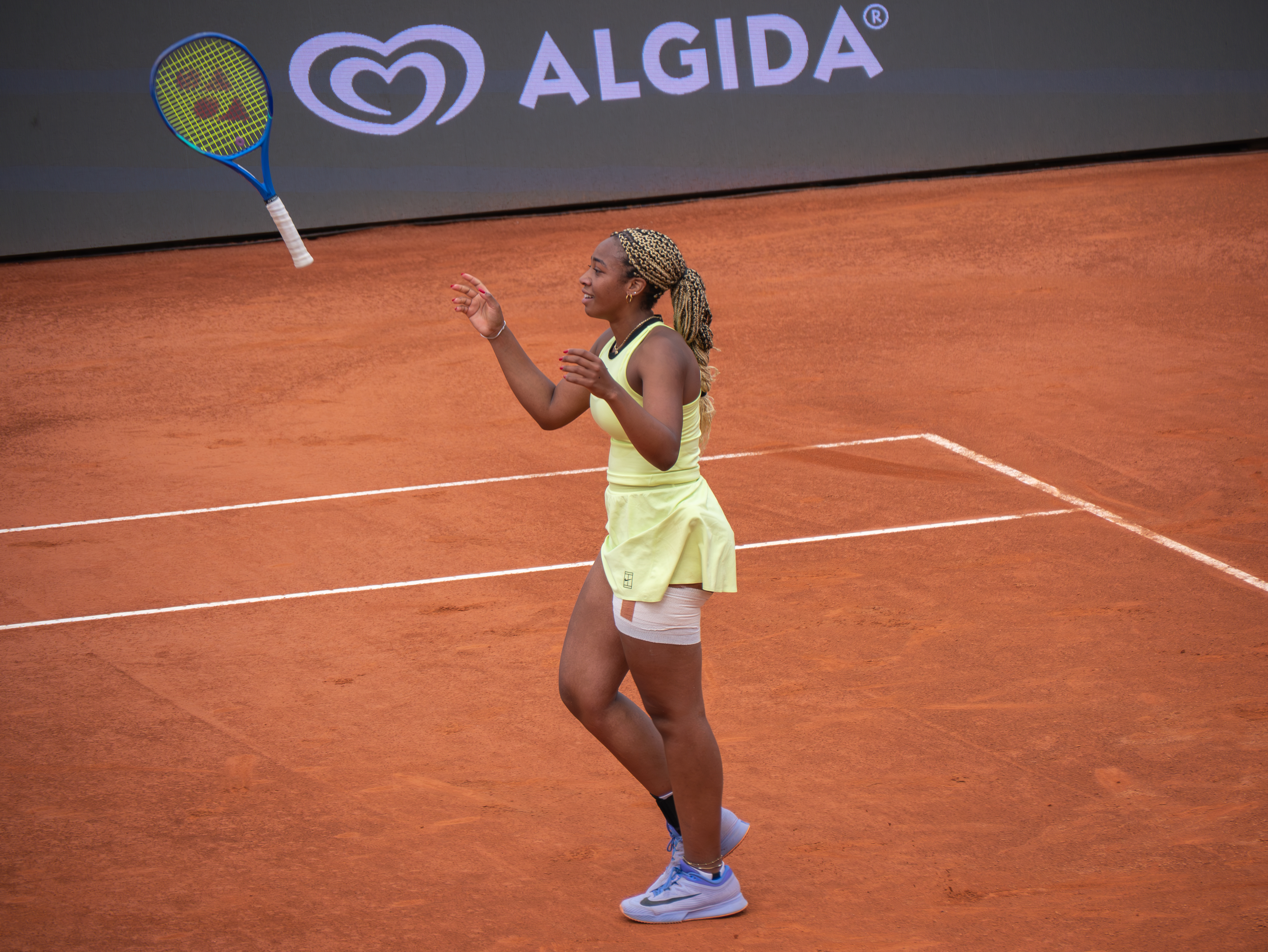
Grant at the 2026 Italian Open

In June, Grant qualified for her first singles major main draw, getting through the Wimbledon qualifying rounds by defeating Taylah Preston, Joanna Garland, and Harmony Tan, for the loss of only one set across all three matches. She then reached the second round of the main draw with an upset straight-sets win against home player Katie Boulter without facing a single break point in the match.

== WTA 125 finals ==
=== Singles: 1 (runner-up) ===
| Result | Date | Tournament | Surface | Opponent | Score |
|---|---|---|---|---|---|
| Loss | Jun 2026 | Foggia Open, Italy | Clay | (Spain) Leyre Romero Gormaz | 5–7, 6–0, 2–6 |

== ITF Circuit finals ==
=== Singles: 6 (4 titles, 2 runner-ups) ===
| Legend W75 tournaments (1–0) W50 tournaments (1–2) W35 tournaments (1–0) W15 tournaments (1–0) | Finals by surface Hard (1–1) Clay (3–1) |

| Result | W–L | Date | Tournament | Tier | Surface | Opponent | Score |
|---|---|---|---|---|---|---|---|
| Win | 1–0 | Mar 2024 | ITF Antalya, Turkey | W15 | Clay | (Serbia) Anja Stanković | 6–0, 6–4 |
| Win | 2–0 | Nov 2024 | ITF Sëlva Gardena, Italy | W50 | Hard (i) | (Canada) Stacey Fung | 3–6, 6–1, 7–5 |
| Loss | 2–1 | Jan 2025 | Porto Indoor, Portugal | W50+H | Hard (i) | (Lithuania) Justina Mikulskytė | 7–6^{(2)}, 3–6, 2–6 |
| Loss | 2–2 | Aug 2025 | ITF Bytom, Poland | W50 | Clay | (Sweden) Kajsa Rinaldo Persson | 3–6, 3–6 |
| Win | 3–2 | Apr 2026 | ITF Santa Margherita di Pula, Italy | W35 | Clay | (Czech Republic) Alena Kovačková | 6–4, 6–2 |
| Win | 4–2 | May 2026 | Slovak Open, Slovakia | W75 | Clay | (Germany) Caroline Werner | 6–3, 6–3 |

=== Doubles: 3 (2 titles, 1 runner-up) ===
| Legend W50 tournaments (1–0) W35 tournaments (0–1) W15 tournaments (1–0) | Finals by surface Hard (1–0) Clay (1–1) |

| Result | W–L | Date | Tournament | Tier | Surface | Partner | Opponents | Score |
|---|---|---|---|---|---|---|---|---|
| Win | 1–0 | Mar 2024 | ITF Antalya, Turkey | W15 | Clay | (Italy) Aurora Zantedeschi | (Ukraine) Yelyzaveta Kotliar (Ukraine) Antonina Sushkova | 6–2, 6–2 |
| Win | 2–0 | Oct 2024 | Open Nantes Atlantique, France | W50 | Hard (i) | (Italy) Camilla Rosatello | (Latvia) Diāna Marcinkēviča (Burundi) Sada Nahimana | 6–2, 6–1 |
| Loss | 2–1 | Mar 2026 | ITF Santa Margherita di Pula, Italy | W35 | Clay | (Italy) Jennifer Ruggeri | (Italy) Enola Chiesa (Latvia) Beatrise Zeltiņa | 4–6, 7–6^{(3)}, [7–10] |

== Junior Grand Slam tournament finals ==
=== Doubles: 4 (3 titles, 1 runner-up) ===
| Result | Year | Tournament | Surface | Partner | Opponents | Score |
|---|---|---|---|---|---|---|
| Win | 2023 | French Open | Clay | (United States) Clervie Ngounoue | Alina Korneeva (Japan) Sara Saito | 6–3, 6–2 |
| Win | 2024 | Australian Open | Hard | (United States) Iva Jovic | (Czech Republic) Julie Paštiková (Germany) Julia Stusek | 6–3, 6–1 |
| Loss | 2024 | French Open | Clay | (United States) Iva Jovic | (Slovakia) Renáta Jamrichová (Czech Republic) Tereza Valentová | 4–6, 4–6 |
| Win | 2024 | Wimbledon | Grass | (United States) Iva Jovic | (United Kingdom) Mika Stojsavljevic (United Kingdom) Mimi Xu | 7–5, 4–6, [10–8] |
