= Cho I-hsuan =

Taiwanese tennis player (born 2000)

- Native name: 卓宜萱
- Country (sports): Chinese Taipei
- Born: 21 February 2000 (age 26) Taiwan
- Plays: Right (two-handed both sides)
- Prize money: $79,822

Singles
- Career record: 100–104
- Highest ranking: No. 573 (23 October 2023)

Doubles
- Career record: 217–110
- Career titles: 3 WTA 125, 23 ITF
- Highest ranking: No. 88 (24 August 2026)
- Current ranking: No. 94 (2 November 2026)
- Last updated on: 2 November 2026.

Cho I-hsuan
- Traditional Chinese: 卓宜萱
- Simplified Chinese: 卓宜萱
Transcriptions
Standard Mandarin
- Hanyu Pinyin: Zhuō Yíxuān

Cho I-hsuan (Chinese: 卓宜萱; born 21 February 2000) is a Taiwanese tennis player who has specialized in doubles. On 24 August 2026, she peaked at No. 88 in the WTA doubles rankings. Cho has won three WTA 125 doubles titles and 23 on the ITF World Tour.

She made her WTA Tour main-draw debut at the 2016 Taiwan Open where she received a wildcard for the doubles tournament, partnering with Shi Hsin-yuan.

Teaming up with her sister Cho Yi-tsen, she has won three WTA 125 doubles titles at the 2025 ATV Tennis Open, the 2026 Parma Ladies Open the 2026 Open delle Puglie.

== WTA Tour finals ==
=== Doubles: 1 (runner-up) ===
Legend WTA 250 (0–1)	Finals by surface Hard (0–1)	Finals by setting Outdoor (0–1)

Result	Date	Tournament	Tier	Surface	Partner	Opponents	Score
Loss	Oct 2026	Guangzhou Open, China	WTA 250	Hard	(Chinese Taipei) Cho Yi-tsen	(Uzbekistan) Maria Timofeeva (Uzbekistan) Polina Kudermetova	5–7, 6–7^{(1)}

== WTA 125 finals ==
=== Doubles: 3 (3 titles) ===
Result	W–L	Date	Tournament	Surface	Partner	Opponents	Score
Win	1–0	Jul 2025	ATV Open di Roma, Italy	Clay	(Chinese Taipei) Cho Yi-tsen	(Georgia (country)) Ekaterine Gorgodze (Latvia) Darja Semeņistaja	4–6, 6–4, [10–6]
Win	2–0	May 2026	Parma Open, Italy	Clay	(Chinese Taipei) Cho Yi-tsen	(Italy) Marta Lombardini (Italy) Federica Urgesi	6–2, 6–2
Win	3–0	Jun 2026	Foggia Open, Italy	Clay	(Chinese Taipei) Cho Yi-tsen	(France) Estelle Cascino (Slovenia) Nika Radišić	4–6, 6–3, [10–4]

== ITF Circuit finals ==
=== Doubles: 42 (23 titles, 19 runner-ups) ===
Legend W100 tournaments W75 tournaments W40/50 tournaments W25/35 tournaments W10/15 tournaments	Finals by surface Hard (21–19) Clay (2–0)

Result	W–L	Date	Tournament	Tier	Surface	Partner	Opponents	Score
Win	1–0	Jul 2015	ITF Sharm El Sheikh, Egypt	W10	Hard	(Russia) Kseniia Bekker	(United States) Julia Jones (Norway) Caroline Rohde-Moe	6–3, 3–6, [10–4]
Loss	1–1	Jun 2016	ITF Kaohsiung, Taiwan	W10	Hard	(Chinese Taipei) Lee Hua-chen	(Chinese Taipei) Chien Pei-ju (Chinese Taipei) Lee Pei-chi	5–7, 2–6
Win	2–1	Oct 2016	ITF Hua Hin, Thailand	W10	Hard	(China) Zhang Yukun	(Thailand) Kamonwan Buayam (Chinese Taipei) Lee Pei-chi	2–6, 6–3, [10–7]
Win	3–1	Jun 2017	ITF Taipei, Taiwan	W15	Hard	(Chinese Taipei) Cho Yi-tsen	(Hong Kong) Eudice Chong (Hong Kong) Katherine Ip	6–2, 6–3
Win	4–1	Jun 2018	ITF Sangju, South Korea	W15	Hard	(China) Wang Danni	(Japan) Chisa Hosonuma (Japan) Kanako Morisaki	7–5, 6–3
Win	5–1	Sep 2018	ITF Nonthaburi, Thailand	W15	Hard	(China) Wang Danni	(India) Riya Bhatia (China) Lu Jiaxi	6–4, 6–3
Loss	5–2	Sep 2018	ITF Nonthaburi, Thailand	W15	Hard	(China) Wang Danni	(Thailand) Nudnida Luangnam (Thailand) Bunyawi Thamchaiwat	2–6, 0–6
Loss	5–3	Sep 2018	ITF Anning, China	W15	Hard	(Chinese Taipei) Cho Yi-tsen	(India) Sowjanya Bavisetti (China) Wang Danni	6–7^{(4)}, 5–7
Loss	5–4	Sep 2018	ITF Anning, China	W15	Hard	(Chinese Taipei) Cho Yi-tsen	(China) Sun Xuliu (China) Zhao Qianqian	4–6, 7–6^{(2)}, [8–10]
Loss	5–5	Aug 2019	ITF Taipei, Taiwan	W25	Hard	(Chinese Taipei) Cho Yi-tsen	(India) Riya Bhatia (Japan) Ramu Ueda	5–7, 2–6
Win	6–5	Jun 2022	ITF Monastir, Tunisia	W15	Hard	(Italy) Matilde Mariani	(France) Chloé Cirotte (France) Marie Villet	7–5, 6–1
Loss	6–6	Jul 2022	ITF Monastir, Tunisia	W15	Hard	(China) Yao Xinxin	(New Zealand) Valentina Ivanov (Australia) Lisa Mays	4–6, 7–6^{(2)}, [8–10]
Win	7–6	Oct 2022	ITF Sharm El Sheikh, Egypt	W15	Hard	(Chinese Taipei) Cho Yi-tsen	(Lithuania) Patricija Paukštytė (Estonia) Liisa Varul	6–0, 6–0
Loss	7–7	Oct 2022	ITF Sharm El Sheikh	W15	Hard	(Chinese Taipei) Cho Yi-tsen	(Belgium) Tilwith di Girolami (Russia) Anastasiia Gureva	2–6, 6–4, [7–10]
Loss	7–8	Oct 2022	ITF Sharm El Sheikh	W15	Hard	(Chinese Taipei) Cho Yi-tsen	(Russia) Anastasiia Gureva (Russia) Elena Pridankina	7–6^{(3)}, 1–6, [6–10]
Win	8–8	Nov 2022	ITF Sharm El Sheikh	W15	Hard	(Chinese Taipei) Cho Yi-tsen	(China) Dong Na (Thailand) Mananchaya Sawangkaew	6–2, 7–6^{(4)}
Win	9–8	Nov 2022	ITF Sharm El Sheikh	W15	Hard	(Chinese Taipei) Cho Yi-tsen	(Russia) Aliona Falei (Russia) Aglaya Fedorova	6–3, 3–6, [10–5]
Win	10–8	Dec 2022	ITF Sharm El Sheikh	W15	Hard	(Chinese Taipei) Cho Yi-tsen	(Russia) Aglaya Fedorova (Russia) Elizaveta Masnaia	w/o
Win	11–8	Dec 2022	ITF Sharm El Sheikh	W15	Hard	(Chinese Taipei) Cho Yi-tsen	(Kazakhstan) Zhanel Rustemova (Kazakhstan) Aruzhan Sagandikova	6–1, 6–0
Win	12–8	Mar 2023	ITF Jakarta, Indonesia	W15	Hard	(Chinese Taipei) Cho Yi-tsen	(Belgium) Eliessa Vanlangendonck (Belgium) Amelia Waligora	5–7, 6–2, [10–4]
Loss	12–9	Jun 2023	ITF Changwon, Korea	W25	Hard	(Chinese Taipei) Cho Yi-tsen	(China) Guo Hanyu (China) Jiang Xinyu	6–7^{(4)}, 6–7^{(1)}
Loss	12–10	Jun 2023	ITF Daegu, Korea	W25	Hard	(Chinese Taipei) Cho Yi-tsen	(South Korea) Park So-hyun (Hong Kong) Cody Wong	6–4, 6–7^{(2)}, [12–14]
Loss	12–11	Aug 2023	ITF Nanchang, China	W40	Hard	(Chinese Taipei) Cho Yi-tsen	(China) Feng Shuo (China) Zheng Wushuang	7–5, 6–7^{(8)}, [4–10]
Loss	12–12	Sep 2023	ITF Guiyang, China	W25	Hard	(Chinese Taipei) Cho Yi-tsen	(China) Guo Hanyu (China) Jiang Xinyu	5–7, 4–6
Win	13–12	Oct 2023	ITF Shenzhen, China	W40	Hard	(Chinese Taipei) Cho Yi-tsen	(China) Feng Shuo (China) Zheng Wushuang	7–5, 6–3
Win	14–12	Feb 2024	ITF Ipoh, Malaysia	W15	Hard	(Chinese Taipei) Cho Yi-tsen	(China) Guo Meiqi (China) Xiao Zhenghua	6–4, 6–2
Win	15–12	Mar 2024	ITF Kuala Lumpur, Malaysia	W15	Hard	(Chinese Taipei) Cho Yi-tsen	(Chinese Taipei) Lin Fang-an (China) Yuan Chengyiyi	6–3, 7–5
Win	16–12	Mar 2024	ITF Shenzhen, China	W50	Hard	(Chinese Taipei) Cho Yi-tsen	(China) Feng Shuo (China) Wang Jiaqi	6–3, 6–4
Loss	16–13	Apr 2024	ITF Wuning, China	W50	Hard	(Chinese Taipei) Cho Yi-tsen	(India) Rutuja Bhosale (New Zealand) Paige Hourigan	7–5, 6–7^{(5)}, [10–12]
Win	17–13	Jun 2024	ITF Taizhou, China	W50	Hard	(Chinese Taipei) Cho Yi-tsen	(China) Wang Meiling (China) Yao Xinxin	2–6, 7–6^{(5)}, [10–7]
Win	18–13	Jun 2024	ITF Taipei, Taiwan	W35	Hard	(Chinese Taipei) Cho Yi-tsen	(Chinese Taipei) Hsieh Yu-chieh (Chinese Taipei) Lin Fang-an	6–2, 1–6, [10–5]
Loss	18–14	Sep 2024	ITF Fuzhou, China	W50	Hard	(Chinese Taipei) Cho Yi-tsen	(Chinese Taipei) Lee Ya-hsin (Chinese Taipei) Lin Fang-an	3–6, 4–6
Loss	18–15	Nov 2024	Yokohama Challenger, Japan	W50	Hard	(Chinese Taipei) Cho Yi-tsen	(Japan) Momoko Kobori (Japan) Ayano Shimizu	4–6, 6–7^{(2)}
Loss	18–16	Jan 2025	ITF Nonthaburi, Thailand	W75	Hard	(Chinese Taipei) Cho Yi-tsen	(United States) Maria Mateas (United States) Alana Smith	1–6, 3–6
Loss	18–17	Mar 2025	Porto Indoor, Portugal	W75	Hard (i)	(Chinese Taipei) Cho Yi-tsen	(Portugal) Francisca Jorge (Portugal) Matilde Jorge	6–0, 6–7^{(4)}, [8–10]
Loss	18–18	Mar 2025	ITF Murska Sobota, Slovenia	W75	Hard (i)	(Chinese Taipei) Cho Yi-tsen	(Croatia) Petra Marčinko (Croatia) Tara Würth	3–6, 6–3, [4–10]
Win	19–18	Jun 2025	Internazionali di Caserta, Italy	W75	Clay	(Chinese Taipei) Cho Yi-tsen	(Spain) Ariana Geerlings (Japan) Wakana Sonobe	6–3, 7–6^{(5)}
Win	20–18	Jun 2025	Internationaux de Blois, France	W75	Clay	(Chinese Taipei) Cho Yi-tsen	(Spain) Ángela Fita Boluda (Brazil) Laura Pigossi	7–5, 4–6, [10–5]
Win	21–18	Jan 2026	ITF Nonthaburi, Thailand	W75	Hard	(Chinese Taipei) Cho Yi-tsen	(Chinese Taipei) Lee Ya-hsin (Hong Kong) Cody Wong	6–4, 6–7^{(3)}, [10–6]
Loss	21–19	Jan 2026	ITF Nonthaburi, Thailand	W75	Hard	(Chinese Taipei) Cho Yi-tsen	(Hong Kong) Eudice Chong (Chinese Taipei) Liang En-shuo	7–5, 1–6, [8–10]
Win	22–19	Jul 2026	Evansville Classic, US	W100	Hard	(Chinese Taipei) Cho Yi-tsen	(Canada) Kayla Cross (United States) Anna Rogers	6–2, 6–3
Win	23–19	Aug 2026	Landisville Tennis Challenge, US	W100	Hard	(Chinese Taipei) Cho Yi-tsen	(United States) Savannah Broadus (United States) Kylie Collins	6–2, 6–4
