= 2022 Trofeo BMW Cup – Singles =

Singles
- 2022 Trofeo BMW Cup

Final
- Champion: (Croatia) Tena Lukas
- Runner-up: (Chile) Bárbara Gatica
- Score: 6–1, 6–4

Events
Singles	Doubles
← 2019 ·	Trofeo BMW Cup	· 2023 →

Daniela Seguel was the defending champion but lost in the quarterfinals to Deborah Chiesa.

Tena Lukas won the title, defeating Bárbara Gatica in the final, 6–1, 6–4.

== Seeds ==
1. (Poland) Maja Chwalińska (first round)
2. (Uzbekistan) Nigina Abduraimova (first round)
3. (Lithuania) Justina Mikulskytė (first round)
4. (Chile) Bárbara Gatica (final)
5. (Czech Republic) Miriam Kolodziejová (first round)
6. (Latvia) Daniela Vismane (first round)
7. Iryna Shymanovich (second round)
8. (United Kingdom) Jodie Burrage (first round)

== Draw ==
=== Key ===
- Q = Qualifier
- WC = Wild card
- LL = Lucky loser
- Alt = Alternate
- SE = Special exempt
- PR = Protected ranking
- ITF = ITF entry
- JE = Junior exempt
- w/o = Walkover
- r = Retired
- d = Defaulted
- SR = Special ranking

=== Finals ===
Semifinals
Darya Astakhova	3	2^{r}
4	(Chile) Bárbara Gatica	6	3
Q	(Italy) Deborah Chiesa	6^{5}	7^{8}	2
(Croatia) Tena Lukas	7^{7}	6^{6}	6

Final
4	(Chile) Bárbara Gatica	1	4
(Croatia) Tena Lukas	6	6

=== Top half ===
First round
1	(Poland) M Chwalińska	6^{5}	3
D Astakhova	7^{7}	6
Q	(Romania) IG Ghioroaie	1	0^{r}
Q	(Italy) N Brancaccio	6	0
WC	(Italy) G Crescenzi	1	0
Q	(United States) J Aney	6	6
(Hungary) T Babos	3	6	6
5	(Czech Republic) M Kolodziejová	6	4	3
4	(Chile) B Gatica	6	6
WC	(Italy) C Rosatello	3	4
(India) A Raina	6^{5}	2
WC	(Italy) A Raggi	7^{7}	6
I Khromacheva	6	6
(Czech Republic) A Sisková	3	3
(Italy) M Di Giuseppe	6	6
8	(United Kingdom) J Burrage	4	4

Second round
D Astakhova	7	6
Q	(Italy) N Brancaccio	5	2
Q	(United States) J Aney	5	7^{7}	4
(Hungary) T Babos	7	6^{4}	6
4	(Chile) B Gatica	6	7
WC	(Italy) A Raggi	1	5
I Khromacheva	6	1	6
(Italy) M Di Giuseppe	1	6	0

Quarterfinals
D Astakhova	6	7
(Hungary) T Babos	2	5
4	(Chile) B Gatica	6	6
I Khromacheva	3	1

Semifinals
D Astakhova	3	2^{r}
4	(Chile) B Gatica	6	3

=== Bottom half ===
First round
7	I Shymanovich	6	6
Q	(Argentina) J Ortenzi	3	3
(Chile) D Seguel	6	6
Q	(Greece) S Sakellaridi	4	4
(North Macedonia) L Gjorcheska	6	7^{7}
Q	(France) S Cakarevic	3	6^{2}
Q	(Italy) D Chiesa	6	6
3	(Lithuania) J Mikulskytė	2	1
6	(Latvia) D Vismane	3	5
(Romania) C Dinu	6	7
(Serbia) N Stevanović	4
(Latvia) K Bartone	2^{r}
Q	(Italy) S Rubini	6	0^{r}
WC	(Italy) L Pigato	2	2
(Croatia) T Lukas	6	7^{7}
2	(Uzbekistan) N Abduraimova	4	6^{1}

Second round
7	I Shymanovich	3	2
(Chile) D Seguel	6	6
(North Macedonia) L Gjorcheska	6	4	2
Q	(Italy) D Chiesa	4	6	6
(Romania) C Dinu	1	6	6
(Serbia) N Stevanović	6	2	1
WC	(Italy) L Pigato	4	0
(Croatia) T Lukas	6	6

Quarterfinals
(Chile) D Seguel	4	4
Q	(Italy) D Chiesa	6	6
(Romania) C Dinu	3	1
(Croatia) T Lukas	6	6

Semifinals
Q	(Italy) D Chiesa	6^{5}	7^{8}	2
(Croatia) T Lukas	7^{7}	6^{6}	6
