= 2022 Trofeo BMW Cup =

Tennis tournament

- Date: 16–22 May 2022
- Edition: 17th
- Category: ITF Women's World Tennis Tour
- Prize money: $60,000
- Surface: Clay / Outdoor
- Location: Rome, Italy

Champions

Singles
- (Croatia) Tena Lukas

Doubles
- (Italy) Matilde Paoletti / (Italy) Lisa Pigato
- Trofeo BMW Cup

The 2022 Trofeo BMW Cup was a professional tennis tournament played on outdoor clay courts. It was the seventeenth edition of the tournament which was part of the 2022 ITF Women's World Tennis Tour. It took place in Rome, Italy between 16 and 22 May 2022.

== Singles main draw entrants ==
=== Seeds ===
| Country | Player | Rank^{1} | Seed |
|---|---|---|---|
| POL | Maja Chwalińska | 176 | 1 |
| UZB | Nigina Abduraimova | 214 | 2 |
| LTU | Justina Mikulskytė | 239 | 3 |
| CHI | Bárbara Gatica | 241 | 4 |
| CZE | Miriam Kolodziejová | 252 | 5 |
| LAT | Daniela Vismane | 255 | 6 |
| | Iryna Shymanovich | 256 | 7 |
| GBR | Jodie Burrage | 260 | 8 |

- ^{1} Rankings are as of 9 May 2022.

=== Other entrants ===
The following players received wildcards into the singles main draw:

- (Italy) Giulia Crescenzi
- (Italy) Lisa Pigato
- (Italy) Angelica Raggi
- (Italy) Camilla Rosatello

The following players received entry from the qualifying draw:

- (United States) Jessie Aney
- (Italy) Nuria Brancaccio
- (France) Sara Cakarevic
- (Italy) Deborah Chiesa
- (Romania) Ilona Georgiana Ghioroaie
- (Argentina) Jazmín Ortenzi
- (Italy) Stefania Rubini
- (Greece) Sapfo Sakellaridi

== Champions ==
=== Singles ===
- (Croatia) Tena Lukas def. (Chile) Bárbara Gatica, 6–1, 6–4

=== Doubles ===
- (Italy) Matilde Paoletti / (Italy) Lisa Pigato def. Darya Astakhova / (Latvia) Daniela Vismane, 6–3, 7–6^{(9–7)}
