= 2023 BMW Roma Cup =

Tennis tournament

- Date: 12–18 June 2023
- Edition: 18th
- Category: ITF Women's World Tennis Tour
- Prize money: $60,000
- Surface: Clay / Outdoor
- Location: Rome, Italy

Champions

Singles
- (Croatia) Petra Marčinko

Doubles
- (Italy) Angelica Moratelli / (Italy) Camilla Rosatello
← 2022 ·	BMW Roma Cup	· 2024 →

The 2023 BMW Roma Cup was a professional tennis tournament played on outdoor clay courts. It was the eighteenth edition of the tournament, which was part of the 2023 ITF Women's World Tennis Tour. It took place in Rome, Italy, between 12 and 18 June 2023.

== Champions ==
=== Singles ===
- (Croatia) Petra Marčinko def. (Italy) Georgia Pedone, 6–2, 6–2

=== Doubles ===
- (Italy) Angelica Moratelli / (Italy) Camilla Rosatello def. (Romania) Oana Gavrilă / (Greece) Sapfo Sakellaridi, 3–6, 6–0, [10–7]

== Singles main draw entrants ==
=== Seeds ===
Country	Player	Rank	Seed
ITA	Lucia Bronzetti	65	1
JPN	Moyuka Uchijima	145	2
FRA	Kristina Mladenovic	166	3
FRA	Chloé Paquet	183	4
CZE	Lucie Havlíčková	199	5
CZE	Barbora Palicová	213	6
MEX	Renata Zarazúa	232	7
FRA	Audrey Albié	253	8

- Rankings are as of 29 May 2023.

=== Other entrants ===
The following players received wildcards into the singles main draw:

- (Germany) Caroline Brack
- (Italy) Georgia Pedone
- (Italy) Dalila Spiteri
- (Italy) Denise Valente

The following players received entry from the qualifying draw:

- Anastasia Kovaleva
- (Argentina) Guillermina Naya
- (United States) Christina Rosca
- (Germany) Natalia Siedliska
- (Australia) Tina Nadine Smith
- (Bulgaria) Julia Terziyska
- (Italy) Anna Turati
- (Italy) Aurora Zantedeschi

The following player received entry as a lucky loser:

- (Italy) Angelica Moratelli
