= 2017 Internazionali Femminili di Brescia – Doubles =

Doubles
- 2017 Internazionali Femminili di Brescia

Final
- Champion: (Israel) Julia Glushko (Australia) Priscilla Hon
- Runner-up: (Paraguay) Montserrat González (Belarus) Ilona Kremen
- Score: 2–6, 7–6^{(7–4)}, [10–8]

Events
Singles	Doubles
← 2016 ·	Internazionali Femminili di Brescia	· 2018 →

Deborah Chiesa and Martina Colmegna were the defending champions, but they lost in the quarterfinals to Montserrat González and Ilona Kremen.

Julia Glushko and Priscilla Hon won the title, defeating González and Kremen in the final, 2–6, 7–6^{(7–4)}, [10–8].

== Seeds ==
1. (Argentina) Catalina Pella / (Chile) Daniela Seguel (semifinals)
2. (Brazil) Laura Pigossi / (Switzerland) Jil Teichmann (semifinals; withdrew)
3. (Italy) Alice Matteucci / (Italy) Camilla Rosatello (quarterfinals)
4. (Paraguay) Montserrat González / (Belarus) Ilona Kremen (final)

== Draw ==
=== Key ===
- Q = Qualifier
- WC = Wild card
- LL = Lucky loser
- Alt = Alternate
- SE = Special exempt
- PR = Protected ranking
- ITF = ITF entry
- JE = Junior exempt
- w/o = Walkover
- r = Retired
- d = Defaulted
- SR = Special ranking

First round
1	(Argentina) C Pella (Chile) D Seguel	6	6
(Brazil) C Alves (Bosnia and Herzegovina) J Simić	0	3
(Russia) M Marfutina (Bulgaria) I Shinikova	6	6
Alt	(Italy) A Dario (Italy) S Marcionni	2	1
3	(Italy) A Matteucci (Italy) C Rosatello	7	4	[10]
(Czech Republic) J Malečková (Switzerland) C Perrin	5	6	[4]
(Israel) J Glushko (Australia) P Hon	6	4	[10]
(Italy) G Brescia (Norway) U Eikeri	4	6	[7]
(Italy) A Balducci (Italy) A Moratelli	6^{2}	6^{4}
(Italy) D Chiesa (Italy) M Colmegna	7^{7}	7^{7}
WC	(Italy) C Ferrando (Slovenia) P Hercog
4	(Paraguay) M González (Belarus) I Kremen	w/o
WC	(Italy) C Fermi (Italy) B Ivaldi	4	0
(Russia) A Komardina (Ukraine) G Poznikhirenko	6	6
WC	(Italy) L Stefanini (Italy) B Torelli	2	1
2	(Brazil) L Pigossi (Switzerland) J Teichmann	6	6

Quarterfinals
1	(Argentina) C Pella (Chile) D Seguel	6	6
(Russia) M Marfutina (Bulgaria) I Shinikova	0	4
3	(Italy) A Matteucci (Italy) C Rosatello	2	3
(Israel) J Glushko (Australia) P Hon	6	6
(Italy) D Chiesa (Italy) M Colmegna	0	5
4	(Paraguay) M González (Belarus) I Kremen	6	7
(Russia) A Komardina (Ukraine) G Poznikhirenko	4	6	[8]
2	(Brazil) L Pigossi (Switzerland) J Teichmann	6	2	[10]

Semifinals
1	(Argentina) C Pella (Chile) D Seguel	2	3
(Israel) J Glushko (Australia) P Hon	6	6
4	(Paraguay) M González (Belarus) I Kremen	w/o
2	(Brazil) L Pigossi (Switzerland) J Teichmann

Final
(Israel) J Glushko (Australia) P Hon	2	7^{7}	[10]
4	(Paraguay) M González (Belarus) I Kremen	6	6^{4}	[8]
