= 2015 Internazionali Femminili di Brescia – Doubles =

Doubles
- 2015 Internazionali Femminili di Brescia

Final
- Champions: (Germany) Laura Siegemund (Czech Republic) Renata Voráčová
- Runners-up: (Argentina) María Irigoyen (Liechtenstein) Stephanie Vogt
- Score: 6–2, 6–1

Events
| Singles | Doubles |
| ← 2014 · | Internazionali Femminili di Brescia | · 2016 → |

Sanaz Marand and Florencia Molinero were the defending champions, but both players chose not to participate.

Laura Siegemund and Renata Voráčová won the title, defeating María Irigoyen and Stephanie Vogt in the final, 6–2, 6–1.

== Seeds ==
1. (Germany) Laura Siegemund / (Czech Republic) Renata Voráčová (champions)
2. (Argentina) María Irigoyen / (Liechtenstein) Stephanie Vogt (final)
3. (Czech Republic) ~~Barbora Krejčíková~~ / (Netherlands) ~~Arantxa Rus~~ (withdrew)
4. (Georgia (country)) Ekaterine Gorgodze / (Slovenia) Nastja Kolar (quarterfinals)
5. (Argentina) Paula Ormaechea / (Australia) Olivia Rogowska (quarterfinals)

== Draw ==
=== Key ===
- Q = Qualifier
- WC = Wild card
- LL = Lucky loser
- Alt = Alternate
- SE = Special exempt
- PR = Protected ranking
- ITF = ITF entry
- JE = Junior exempt
- w/o = Walkover
- r = Retired
- d = Defaulted
- SR = Special ranking

First round
1 | (Germany) L Siegemund (Czech Republic) R Voráčová | 6 | 6
(Germany) N Geuer (Switzerland) V Golubic | 4 | 3
Alt | (Belarus) I Shymanovich (Russia) N Vikhlyantseva | 3 | 6^{4}
(Georgia (country)) S Kvatsabaia (Georgia (country)) S Shapatava | 6 | 7^{7}
5 | (Argentina) P Ormaechea (Australia) O Rogowska | 2 | 6 | [10]
(Italy) G Brescia (Italy) C Giovine | 6 | 4 | [8]
WC | (Italy) M Caciotti (Italy) M Masini | 3 | 0
(Italy) D Chiesa (Italy) A Grymalska | 6 | 6
(Croatia) T Mrdeža (Poland) K Piter | 6 | 6
(Sweden) S Celik (Ukraine) A Fomina | 1 | 0
(Italy) M Caregaro (Italy) C Ferrando | 3 | 2
4 | (Georgia (country)) E Gorgodze (Slovenia) N Kolar | 6 | 6
(Brazil) G Cé (Mexico) AS Sánchez | 6 | 1 | [8]
Alt | (Canada) H El Tabakh (United States) A Kiick | 4 | 6 | [10]
WC | (Italy) G Marchetti (Italy) A Moratelli | 3 | 1
2 | (Argentina) M Irigoyen (Liechtenstein) S Vogt | 6 | 6

Quarterfinals
1 | (Germany) L Siegemund (Czech Republic) R Voráčová | 6 | 6
(Georgia (country)) S Kvatsabaia (Georgia (country)) S Shapatava | 2 | 0
5 | (Argentina) P Ormaechea (Australia) O Rogowska | 2 | 3
(Italy) D Chiesa (Italy) A Grymalska | 6 | 6
(Croatia) T Mrdeža (Poland) K Piter | 6 | 6
4 | (Georgia (country)) E Gorgodze (Slovenia) N Kolar | 3 | 4
Alt | (Canada) H El Tabakh (United States) A Kiick | 7^{7} | 3 | [5]
2 | (Argentina) M Irigoyen (Liechtenstein) S Vogt | 6^{5} | 6 | [10]

Semifinals
1 | (Germany) L Siegemund (Czech Republic) R Voráčová | 6 | 6
(Italy) D Chiesa (Italy) A Grymalska | 2 | 2
(Croatia) T Mrdeža (Poland) K Piter | 3 | 2
2 | (Argentina) M Irigoyen (Liechtenstein) S Vogt | 6 | 6

Final
1 | (Germany) L Siegemund (Czech Republic) R Voráčová | 6 | 6
2 | (Argentina) M Irigoyen (Liechtenstein) S Vogt | 2 | 1
