= 2021 Swedish Open – Women's singles =

Women's singles
- 2021 Swedish Open

Final
- Champion: (Spain) Nuria Párrizas Díaz
- Runner-up: (Belarus) Olga Govortsova
- Score: 6–2, 6–2

Events
Singles	men	women
Doubles	men	women
- Swedish Open

Misaki Doi was the defending champion but chose not to participate.

Nuria Párrizas Díaz won the title, defeating Olga Govortsova in the final, 6–2, 6–2.

== Seeds ==
1. (Sweden) Rebecca Peterson (semifinals)
2. (Russia) Anna Kalinskaya (second round, retired)
3. (Egypt) Mayar Sherif (quarterfinals)
4. (United States) Claire Liu (quarterfinals)
5. (Slovakia) Anna Karolína Schmiedlová (second round)
6. (Russia) Kamilla Rakhimova (first round)
7. (Belarus) Olga Govortsova (final)
8. (Australia) Maddison Inglis (second round)

== Draw ==
Key

- Q = Qualifier
- WC = Wild card
- LL = Lucky loser
- Alt = Alternate
- ITF = ITF entry
- PR = Protected ranking
- SR = Special ranking
- SE = Special exempt
- JE = Junior exempt
- JR = Junior Accelerator Programme entrant
- CO = College Accelerator Programme entrant
- NG = Next Gen Accelerator Program entrant
- w/o = Walkover
- r = Retired
- d = Defaulted

=== Finals ===
Semifinals
1	(Sweden) Rebecca Peterson	3	4
7	(Belarus) Olga Govortsova	6	6
(Spain) Nuria Párrizas Díaz	6	6
(Romania) Mihaela Buzărnescu	3	4

Final
7	(Belarus) Olga Govortsova	2	2
(Spain) Nuria Párrizas Díaz	6	6

=== Top half ===
First round
1	(Sweden) R Peterson	7^{8}	6
(United States) G Min	6^{6}	1
(Spain) L Arruabarrena	6	6
(Italy) G Gatto-Monticone	2	3
(Sweden) M Björklund	2	2
(Spain) A Bolsova	6	6
(United States) K Volynets	7	6
6	(Russia) K Rakhimova	5	1
3	(Egypt) M Sherif	6	6^{6}	6
(United Kingdom) F Jones	4	7^{8}	0
(Ukraine) K Kozlova	6	6
(Russia) N Vikhlyantseva	2	4
(Switzerland) L Küng	6	6
PR	(Ukraine) D Lopatetska	4	4
(United States) F Di Lorenzo	3	6	2
7	(Belarus) O Govortsova	6	2	6

Second round
1	(Sweden) R Peterson	6	6
(Spain) L Arruabarrena	1	1
(Spain) A Bolsova	6	6
(United States) K Volynets	4	1
3	(Egypt) M Sherif	7^{11}	6
(Ukraine) K Kozlova	6^{9}	0
(Switzerland) L Küng	5	1
7	(Belarus) O Govortsova	7	6

Quarterfinals
1	(Sweden) R Peterson	7	6
(Spain) A Bolsova	5	4
3	(Egypt) M Sherif	4	2
7	(Belarus) O Govortsova	6	6

Semifinals
1	(Sweden) R Peterson	3	4
7	(Belarus) O Govortsova	6	6

=== Bottom half ===
First round
8	(Australia) M Inglis	3	7^{7}	7^{7}
(Romania) J Cristian	6	6^{5}	6^{3}
(Spain) N Párrizas Díaz	6	6
(United States) V Lepchenko	4	2
WC	(Sweden) C Hennemann	6	6
WC	(Sweden) Vanessa Ersöz	0	1
WC	(Sweden) Lisa Zaar	2	2
4	(United States) C Liu	6	6
5	(Slovakia) AK Schmiedlová	0	7	6
(France) C Burel	6	5	2
(Romania) M Buzărnescu	6	6
(Slovakia) Z Zlochová	2	1
(Hungary) A Bondár	7^{7}	6
PR	(India) K Thandi	6^{5}	0
WC	(Sweden) F Östlund	2	6	4
2	(Russia) A Kalinskaya	6	2	6

Second round
8	(Australia) M Inglis	2	6	1
(Spain) N Párrizas Díaz	6	3	6
WC	(Sweden) C Hennemann	0	1
4	(United States) C Liu	6	6
5	(Slovakia) AK Schmiedlová	2	2
(Romania) M Buzărnescu	6	6
(Hungary) A Bondár	6	3
2	(Russia) A Kalinskaya	4	0^{r}

Quarterfinals
(Spain) N Párrizas Díaz	6	6
4	(United States) C Liu	2	4
(Romania) M Buzărnescu	6	6
(Hungary) A Bondár	2	4

Semifinals
(Spain) N Párrizas Díaz	6	6
(Romania) M Buzărnescu	3	4
