= 2017 Internazionali Femminili di Brescia =

- Date: 5–11 June
- Edition: 10th
- Category: ITF Women's Circuit
- Prize money: $60,000
- Surface: Clay
- Location: Brescia, Italy

Champions

Singles
- (Slovenia) Polona Hercog

Doubles
- (Israel) Julia Glushko / (Australia) Priscilla Hon
- Internazionali Femminili di Brescia

The 2017 Internazionali Femminili di Brescia was a professional tennis tournament played on outdoor clay courts. It was the tenth edition of the tournament and part of the 2017 ITF Women's Circuit, offering a total of $60,000 in prize money. It took place in Brescia, Italy, from 5–11 June 2017.

== Point distribution ==
| Event | W | F | SF | QF | Round of 16 | Round of 32 | Q | Q2 | Q3 |
| Singles | 80 | 48 | 29 | 15 | 8 | 1 | 5 | 3 | 1 |
| Doubles | 80 | 48 | 29 | 15 | 1 | —N/a | —N/a | —N/a | —N/a |

== Singles main draw entrants ==
=== Seeds ===
| Country | Player | Rank^{1} | Seed |
|---|---|---|---|
| UKR | Kateryna Kozlova | 140 | 1 |
| SUI | Jil Teichmann | 152 | 2 |
| AUT | Barbara Haas | 161 | 3 |
| BUL | Isabella Shinikova | 169 | 4 |
| RUS | Anastasiya Komardina | 176 | 5 |
| PAR | Montserrat González | 190 | 6 |
| SLO | Polona Hercog | 205 | 7 |
| SUI | Conny Perrin | 206 | 8 |

- ^{1} Rankings as of 29 May 2017

=== Other entrants ===
The following players received wildcards into the singles main draw:

- (Italy) Stefania Rubini
- (Italy) Camilla Scala
- (Italy) Lucrezia Stefanini
- (Italy) Beatrice Torelli

The following players received entry from the qualifying draw:

- (Italy) Martina Caregaro
- (Italy) Deborah Chiesa
- (Australia) Priscilla Hon
- (Bosnia and Herzegovina) Jelena Simić

The following player received entry as a lucky loser:

- (Brazil) Carolina Alves

== Champions ==
=== Singles ===
- (Slovenia) Polona Hercog def. (Ukraine) Ganna Poznikhirenko, 6–2, 7–5

=== Doubles ===
- (Israel) Julia Glushko / (Australia) Priscilla Hon def. (Paraguay) Montserrat González / (Belarus) Ilona Kremen, 2–6, 7–6^{(7–4)}, [10–8]
