= 2024 ATV Tennis Open – Singles =

Singles
- 2024 ATV Tennis Open

Final
- Champion: Oksana Selekhmeteva
- Runner-up: (North Macedonia) Lina Gjorcheska
- Score: 6–1, 7–6^{(7–3)}

Events
Singles	Doubles
← 2023 ·	ATV Tennis Open	· 2025 →

Jéssica Bouzas Maneiro was the defending champion but chose not to participate.

Oksana Selekhmeteva won the title, defeating Lina Gjorcheska in the final; 6–1, 7–6^{(7–3)}.

== Seeds ==
1. (Hungary) Anna Bondár (second round)
2. (Croatia) Lea Bošković (semifinals)
3. (Australia) Priscilla Hon (first round)
4. (United States) Varvara Lepchenko (quarterfinals)
5. (Germany) Mona Barthel (second round)
6. (Croatia) Tena Lukas (first round)
7. (North Macedonia) Lina Gjorcheska (final)
8. (Spain) Guiomar Maristany (quarterfinals)

== Draw ==
=== Key ===
- Q = Qualifier
- WC = Wild card
- LL = Lucky loser
- Alt = Alternate
- SE = Special exempt
- PR = Protected ranking
- ITF = ITF entry
- JE = Junior exempt
- w/o = Walkover
- r = Retired
- d = Defaulted
- SR = Special ranking

=== Finals ===
Semifinals
(Croatia) Petra Marčinko	7	2	1
7	(North Macedonia) Lina Gjorcheska	5	6	6
SE	Oksana Selekhmeteva	6	6
2	(Croatia) Lea Bošković	0	2

Final
7	(North Macedonia) Lina Gjorcheska	1	6^{3}
SE	Oksana Selekhmeteva	6	7^{7}

=== Top half ===
First round
1	(Hungary) A Bondár	6	6
(Italy) N Brancaccio	3	4
(Croatia) P Marčinko	7^{9}	6
Q	(Italy) A Abbagnato	6^{7}	2
(United States) A Kiick	6	6
Q	(Romania) G Lee	1	2
(Spain) I Burillo Escorihuela	2	3
8	(Spain) G Maristany	6	6
4	(United States) V Lepchenko	3	6	7^{9}
Q	M Kozyreva	6	2	6^{7}
(Italy) D Spiteri	2^{r}
Q	(Switzerland) S Bandecchi	4
(Romania) C Dinu	6	7^{7}
(Serbia) M Ristić	2	6^{4}
(Switzerland) L Küng	3	1
7	(North Macedonia) L Gjorcheska	6	6

Second round
1	(Hungary) A Bondár	1	2
(Croatia) P Marčinko	6	6
(United States) A Kiick	3	3
8	(Spain) G Maristany	6	6
4	(United States) V Lepchenko	6	6
Q	(Switzerland) S Bandecchi	3	2
(Romania) C Dinu	0	0^{r}
7	(North Macedonia) L Gjorcheska	6	2

Quarterfinals
(Croatia) P Marčinko	6	7
8	(Spain) G Maristany	2	5
4	(United States) V Lepchenko	4	7	5
7	(North Macedonia) L Gjorcheska	6	5	7

Semifinals
(Croatia) P Marčinko	7	2	1
7	(North Macedonia) L Gjorcheska	5	6	6

=== Bottom half ===
First round
5	(Germany) M Barthel	6	6
(Liechtenstein) K von Deichmann	3	4
Q	E Maklakova	3	3
SE	O Selekhmeteva	6	6
WC	(Italy) B Ricci	1	4
WC	(Italy) G Pedone	6	6
LL	(Italy) A Zantedeschi	7^{7}	6
3	(Australia) P Hon	6^{5}	4
6	(Croatia) T Lukas	2	4
Q	(Spain) Á Fita Boluda	6	6
Q	(United States) R McAdoo	2	1
(Andorra) V Jiménez Kasintseva	6	6
S Lansere	4	6	6
WC	(Italy) T Pieri	6	2	2
Q	A Ibragimova	2	2
2	(Croatia) L Bošković	6	6

Second round
5	(Germany) M Barthel	3	3
SE	O Selekhmeteva	6	6
WC	(Italy) G Pedone	6	6
LL	(Italy) A Zantedeschi	3	2
Q	(Spain) Á Fita Boluda	6	1	2
(Andorra) V Jiménez Kasintseva	4	6	6
S Lansere	2	0^{r}
2	(Croatia) L Bošković	6	1

Quarterfinals
SE	O Selekhmeteva	4	6	6
WC	(Italy) G Pedone	6	1	4
(Andorra) V Jiménez Kasintseva	6^{6}	3
2	(Croatia) L Bošković	7^{8}	6

Semifinals
SE	O Selekhmeteva	6	6
2	(Croatia) L Bošković	0	2
