= 2024 ATV Tennis Open – Doubles =

Doubles
- 2024 ATV Tennis Open

Final
- Champions: (Switzerland) Leonie Küng (India) Vasanti Shinde
- Runners-up: (Italy) Matilde Paoletti (Italy) Beatrice Ricci
- Score: 4–6, 6–4, [10–7]

Events
| Singles | Doubles |
- ATV Tennis Open

Yuliya Hatouka and Zhibek Kulambayeva were the defending champions but Hatouka chose not to participate. Kulambayeva partnered alongside Ekaterina Reyngold but lost in the quarterfinals to Matilde Paoletti and Beatrice Ricci.

Leonie Küng and Vasanti Shinde won the title, defeating Paoletti and Ricci in the final, 4–6, 6–4, [10–7].

== Seeds ==
1. Sofya Lansere / Ekaterina Maklakova (semifinals, withdrew)
2. (Kazakhstan) Zhibek Kulambayeva / Ekaterina Reyngold (quarterfinals)
3. (Czech Republic) Aneta Kučmová / (United States) Rasheeda McAdoo (quarterfinals)
4. (Switzerland) Leonie Küng / (India) Vasanti Shinde (champions)

== Draw ==
Key

- Q = Qualifier
- WC = Wild card
- LL = Lucky loser
- Alt = Alternate
- ITF = ITF entry
- PR = Protected ranking
- SR = Special ranking
- SE = Special exempt
- JE = Junior exempt
- JR = Junior Accelerator Programme entrant
- CO = College Accelerator Programme entrant
- NG = Next Gen Accelerator Program entrant
- w/o = Walkover
- r = Retired
- d = Defaulted

First round
(Romania) C Dinu (Slovenia) Ž Falkner | 6 | 6
(Italy) D Cherubini (Italy) F Pace | 2 | 3
4 | (Switzerland) L Küng (India) V Shinde | 6 | 6
(Italy) S De Stefano (Italy) D Valente | 3 | 2
(Spain) Á Fita Boluda (Croatia) T Würth | 6 | 6
(Argentina) JL Estable (Romania) G Lee | 4 | 2
(Italy) G Pedone (Italy) A Zantedeschi | 6 | 2 | [12]
(Croatia) M Dražić; A Ibragimova | 4 | 6 | [10]
(Italy) E Alvisi (Italy) F Urgesi
(Italy) M Paoletti (Italy) B Ricci | w/o

Quarterfinals
1 | S Lansere; E Maklakova | w/o
(Romania) C Dinu (Slovenia) Ž Falkner
4 | (Switzerland) L Küng (India) V Shinde | 6 | 6^{6} | [10]
(Spain) Á Fita Boluda (Croatia) T Würth | 2 | 7^{8} | [8]
(Italy) G Pedone (Italy) A Zantedeschi | 7 | 6
3 | (Czech Republic) A Kučmová (United States) R McAdoo | 5 | 4
(Italy) M Paoletti (Italy) B Ricci | 7 | 4 | [12]
2 | (Kazakhstan) Z Kulambayeva; E Reyngold | 5 | 6 | [10]

Semifinals
1 | S Lansere; E Maklakova
4 | (Switzerland) L Küng (India) V Shinde | w/o
(Italy) G Pedone (Italy) A Zantedeschi | 1 | 2
(Italy) M Paoletti (Italy) B Ricci | 6 | 6

Final
4 | (Switzerland) L Küng (India) V Shinde | 4 | 6 | [10]
(Italy) M Paoletti (Italy) B Ricci | 6 | 4 | [7]
