= 2021 Swedish Open =

- Date: 5–10 July (women); 12–18 July (men)
- Edition: 73rd (men); 11th (women)
- Surface: Clay
- Venue: Båstad tennis stadium

Champions

Men's singles
- (Norway) Casper Ruud

Women's singles
- (Spain) Nuria Párrizas Díaz

Men's doubles
- (Netherlands) Sander Arends / (Netherlands) David Pel

Women's doubles
- (Sweden) Mirjam Björklund / (Switzerland) Leonie Küng
- Swedish Open

The 2021 Swedish Open, known as the Nordea Open (for sponsorship reasons), was a tennis tournament played on outdoor clay courts as part of the ATP Tour 250 Series of the 2021 ATP Tour and as part of the WTA 125K Series. It took place in Båstad, Sweden, from 12 through 18 July 2021 for the men's tournament, and from 5 through 10 July 2021 for the women's tournament. It was the 73rd edition of the event for the men and the 11th edition for the women.

== Champions ==
=== Men's singles ===
- (Norway) Casper Ruud def. (Argentina) Federico Coria, 6–3, 6–3

=== Women's singles ===
- (Spain) Nuria Párrizas Díaz def. (Belarus) Olga Govortsova 6–2, 6–2

=== Men's doubles ===
- (Netherlands) Sander Arends / (Netherlands) David Pel def. (Germany) Andre Begemann / (France) Albano Olivetti, 6–4, 6–2

=== Women's doubles ===
- (Sweden) Mirjam Björklund / (Switzerland) Leonie Küng def. (Slovakia) Tereza Mihalíková / (Russia) Kamilla Rakhimova 5–7, 6–3, [10–5]

== Points and prize money ==
=== Point distribution ===
Event	W	F	SF	QF	Round of 16	Round of 32	Q	Q2	Q1
Singles	250	150	90	45	20	0	12	6	0
Doubles	250	150	90	45	0	—N/a	—N/a	—N/a	—N/a

=== Prize money ===
Event	W	F	SF	QF	Round of 16	Round of 32	Q2	Q1
Singles	€41,145	€29,500	€21,000	€14,000	€9,000	€5,415	€2,645	€1,375
Doubles*	€15,360	€11,000	€7,250	€4,710	€2,760	—N/a	—N/a	—N/a

_{*per team}

== ATP singles main-draw entrants ==
=== Seeds ===
Country	Player	Rank^{1}	Seed
NOR	Casper Ruud	14	1
CHI	Cristian Garín	20	2
ITA	Fabio Fognini	31	3
AUS	John Millman	43	4
FRA	Richard Gasquet	56	5
ITA	Lorenzo Musetti	63	6
CZE	Jiří Veselý	72	7
FIN	Emil Ruusuvuori	76	8

- ^{1} Rankings are as of 28 June 2021.

=== Other entrants ===
The following players received wildcards into the main draw:

- (Denmark) Holger Rune
- (Sweden) Elias Ymer
- (Sweden) Mikael Ymer

The following players received entry from the qualifying draw:

- (Argentina) Francisco Cerúndolo
- (Switzerland) Henri Laaksonen
- (Austria) Dennis Novak
- (France) Arthur Rinderknech

=== Withdrawals ===
Before the tournament

- (Spain) Carlos Alcaraz → replaced by (Japan) Taro Daniel
- (Spain) Alejandro Davidovich Fokina → replaced by (Spain) Roberto Carballés Baena
- (Belarus) Ilya Ivashka → replaced by (Argentina) Facundo Bagnis
- (Canada) Denis Shapovalov → replaced by (Portugal) Pedro Sousa
- (Italy) Stefano Travaglia → replaced by (Italy) Salvatore Caruso
- (France) Jo-Wilfried Tsonga → replaced by (Germany) Yannick Hanfmann

During the tournament

- (Switzerland) Henri Laaksonen

== ATP doubles main-draw entrants ==
=== Seeds ===
Country	Player	Country	Player	Rank^{1}	Seed
ARG	Andrés Molteni	ITA	Andrea Vavassori	143	1
SWE	André Göransson	DNK	Frederik Nielsen	162	2
URU	Pablo Cuevas	FRA	Fabrice Martin	168	3
USA	Nicholas Monroe	BLR	Andrei Vasilevski	168	4

- ^{1} Rankings are as of 28 June 2021.

=== Other entrants ===
The following pairs received wildcards into the doubles main draw:

- (Sweden) Filip Bergevi / (Sweden) Markus Eriksson
- (Sweden) Carl Söderlund / (Sweden) Elias Ymer

=== Withdrawals ===
Before the tournament

- (Italy) Marco Cecchinato / (Italy) Stefano Travaglia → replaced by (Spain) Roberto Carballés Baena / (Italy) Marco Cecchinato
- (India) Rohan Bopanna / (India) Divij Sharan → replaced by (India) Jeevan Nedunchezhiyan / (India) Purav Raja
- (Moldova) Radu Albot / (Belarus) Ilya Ivashka → replaced by (Moldova) Radu Albot / (Ukraine) Denys Molchanov
- (Spain) Carlos Alcaraz / (Spain) Marc López → replaced by (Germany) Andre Begemann / (France) Albano Olivetti

During the tournament

- (Spain) Roberto Carballés Baena / (Italy) Marco Cecchinato

== WTA singles main-draw entrants ==
=== Seeds ===
Country	Player	Rank^{1}	Seed
SWE	Rebecca Peterson	60	1
RUS	Anna Kalinskaya	109	2
EGY	Mayar Sherif	119	3
USA	Claire Liu	120	4
SVK	Anna Karolína Schmiedlová	122	5
RUS	Kamilla Rakhimova	134	6
BLR	Olga Govortsova	136	7
AUS	Maddison Inglis	140	8

- ^{1} Rankings are as of 28 June 2021.

=== Other entrants ===
The following players received wildcards into the main draw:

- (Sweden) Vanessa Ersöz
- (Sweden) Caijsa Hennemann
- (Sweden) Fanny Östlund
- (Sweden) Lisa Zaar

The following players received entry using protected rankings:

- (Ukraine) Daria Lopatetska
- (India) Karman Thandi

=== Withdrawals ===
Before the tournament

- (United States) Hailey Baptiste → replaced by (United States) Katie Volynets
- (Spain) Cristina Bucșa → replaced by (Ukraine) Daria Lopatetska
- (United States) Asia Muhammad → replaced by (Hungary) Anna Bondár
- (Australia) Storm Sanders → replaced by (United Kingdom) Francesca Jones
- (Denmark) Clara Tauson → replaced by (India) Karman Thandi

== WTA doubles main-draw entrants ==
=== Seeds ===
Country	Player	Country	Player	Rank^{1}	Seed
ESP	Lara Arruabarrena	ESP	Aliona Bolsova	194	1
SWE	Cornelia Lister	NZL	Erin Routliffe	248	2
SVK	Tereza Mihalíková	RUS	Kamilla Rakhimova	306	3
HUN	Anna Bondár	ROU	Jaqueline Cristian	369	4

- ^{1} Rankings are as of 28 June 2021.
