= 2017 Internazionali Femminili di Brescia – Singles =

Singles
- 2017 Internazionali Femminili di Brescia

Final
- Champion: (Slovenia) Polona Hercog
- Runner-up: (Ukraine) Ganna Poznikhirenko
- Score: 6–2, 7–5

Events
Singles	Doubles
← 2016 ·	Internazionali Femminili di Brescia	· 2018 →

Karin Knapp was the defending champion, but chose not to participate.

Polona Hercog won the title, defeating Ganna Poznikhirenko in the final, 6–2, 7–5.

== Seeds ==
1. (Ukraine) Kateryna Kozlova (first round)
2. (Switzerland) Jil Teichmann (first round, retired)
3. (Austria) Barbara Haas (second round, retired)
4. (Bulgaria) Isabella Shinikova (second round)
5. (Russia) Anastasiya Komardina (first round)
6. (Paraguay) Montserrat González (second round)
7. (Slovenia) Polona Hercog (champion)
8. (Switzerland) Conny Perrin (second round)

== Draw ==
=== Key ===
- Q = Qualifier
- WC = Wild card
- LL = Lucky loser
- Alt = Alternate
- SE = Special exempt
- PR = Protected ranking
- ITF = ITF entry
- JE = Junior exempt
- w/o = Walkover
- r = Retired
- d = Defaulted
- SR = Special ranking

=== Finals ===
Semifinals
(Venezuela) Andrea Gámiz	6^{3}	3
(Ukraine) Ganna Poznikhirenko	7^{7}	6
7	(Slovenia) Polona Hercog	3	6	6
WC	(Italy) Stefania Rubini	6	3	2

Final
(Ukraine) Ganna Poznikhirenko	2	5
7	(Slovenia) Polona Hercog	6	7

=== Top half ===
First round
1	(Ukraine) K Kozlova	6^{2}	6^{6}
(Venezuela) A Gámiz	7^{7}	7^{8}
(Israel) J Glushko	6	6
(Italy) C Rosatello	3	3
Q	(Italy) M Caregaro	6^{3}	6	7
Q	(Australia) P Hon	7^{7}	1	5
(Czech Republic) J Malečková	4	3
8	(Switzerland) C Perrin	6	6
3	(Austria) B Haas	6	7
Q	(Italy) D Chiesa	3	5
(Italy) C Ferrando	3	6	6
Q	(Bosnia and Herzegovina) J Simić	6	2	0
(Japan) E Hozumi	6	6
WC	(Italy) C Scala	3	1
(Ukraine) G Poznikhirenko	6	6
5	(Russia) A Komardina	2	4

Second round
(Venezuela) A Gámiz	6	6
(Israel) J Glushko	2	2
Q	(Italy) M Caregaro	3	6	6
8	(Switzerland) C Perrin	6	3	1
3	(Austria) B Haas	6^{5}	0^{r}
(Italy) C Ferrando	7^{7}	0
(Japan) E Hozumi	6	5	4
(Ukraine) G Poznikhirenko	4	7	6

Quarterfinals
(Venezuela) A Gámiz	6	6
Q	(Italy) M Caregaro	0	1
(Italy) C Ferrando	4	2
(Ukraine) G Poznikhirenko	6	6

Semifinals
(Venezuela) A Gámiz	6^{3}	3
(Ukraine) G Poznikhirenko	7^{7}	6

=== Bottom half ===
First round
7	(Slovenia) P Hercog	6	7^{7}
WC	(Italy) L Stefanini	1	6^{2}
LL	(Brazil) C Alves	2	2
(Norway) U Eikeri	6	6
WC	(Italy) B Torelli	6	4	2
(Chile) D Seguel	4	6	6
(Serbia) D Radanović	6	3	0
4	(Bulgaria) I Shinikova	2	6	6
6	(Paraguay) M González	6	5	7^{9}
(Italy) M Trevisan	3	7	6^{7}
(Argentina) C Pella	2	6	3
(Georgia (country)) S Shapatava	6	4	1^{r}
(Russia) V Kamenskaya	6	7^{7}
(Italy) G Brescia	1	6^{1}
WC	(Italy) S Rubini	6	3
2	(Switzerland) J Teichmann	1	1^{r}

Second round
7	(Slovenia) P Hercog	6	6
(Norway) U Eikeri	3	3
(Chile) D Seguel	6	6
4	(Bulgaria) I Shinikova	0	2
6	(Paraguay) M González	5	6^{5}
(Argentina) C Pella	7	7^{7}
(Russia) V Kamenskaya	4	6^{3}
WC	(Italy) S Rubini	6	7^{7}

Quarterfinals
7	(Slovenia) P Hercog	6	6
(Chile) D Seguel	4	4
(Argentina) C Pella	2	3
WC	(Italy) S Rubini	6	6

Semifinals
7	(Slovenia) P Hercog	3	6	6
WC	(Italy) S Rubini	6	3	2
