= 2022 Trofeo BMW Cup – Doubles =

Doubles
- 2022 Trofeo BMW Cup

Final
- Champions: (Italy) Matilde Paoletti (Italy) Lisa Pigato
- Runners-up: Darya Astakhova (Latvia) Daniela Vismane
- Score: 6–3, 7–6^{(9–7)}

Events
Singles	Doubles
← 2019 ·	Trofeo BMW Cup	· 2023 →

Arina Rodionova and Storm Sanders were the defending champions but chose to compete at the 2022 French Open qualifying instead.

Matilde Paoletti and Lisa Pigato won the title, defeating Darya Astakhova and Daniela Vismane in the final, 6–3, 7–6^{(9–7)}.

== Seeds ==
1. (Hungary) Tímea Babos / (Switzerland) Xenia Knoll (first round)
2. (Chile) Bárbara Gatica / (Brazil) Rebeca Pereira (quarterfinals)
3. Irina Khromacheva / (Serbia) Natalija Stevanović (first round)
4. (North Macedonia) Lina Gjorcheska / (Czech Republic) Anna Sisková (quarterfinals)

== Draw ==
=== Key ===
- Q = Qualifier
- WC = Wild card
- LL = Lucky loser
- Alt = Alternate
- SE = Special exempt
- PR = Protected ranking
- ITF = ITF entry
- JE = Junior exempt
- w/o = Walkover
- r = Retired
- d = Defaulted
- SR = Special ranking

=== Draw ===
First round
1	(Hungary) T Babos (Switzerland) X Knoll	6^{5}	2
WC	(Italy) G Crescenzi (Italy) V Meliss	7^{7}	6
(Poland) M Chwalińska (Romania) C Dinu	6	7
(Turkey) B Cengiz (India) A Raina	4	5
4	(North Macedonia) L Gjorcheska (Czech Republic) A Sisková	6	6
(United Kingdom) E Appleton (United Kingdom) A Collins	3	3
(Uzbekistan) N Abduraimova (Romania) N Dascălu	3	6	[6]
D Astakhova (Latvia) D Vismane	6	1	[10]
(Romania) IG Ghioroaie (Lithuania) J Mikulskytė	6	5	[9]
(Czech Republic) M Kolodziejová (Poland) M Kubka	0	7	[11]
(Italy) M Paoletti (Italy) L Pigato	6	6
3	I Khromacheva (Serbia) N Stevanović	4	1
(Italy) M Di Giuseppe (Italy) C Rosatello	6	6
WC	(Italy) C Lazzari (Italy) F Marchiani	2	1
WC	(Italy) C Catini (Italy) S Giovanardi	2	1
2	(Chile) B Gatica (Brazil) R Pereira	6	6

Quarterfinals
WC	(Italy) G Crescenzi (Italy) V Meliss	6^{2}	6	[10]
(Poland) M Chwalińska (Romania) C Dinu	7^{7}	4	[7]
4	(North Macedonia) L Gjorcheska (Czech Republic) A Sisková	2	6	[8]
D Astakhova (Latvia) D Vismane	6	0	[10]
(Czech Republic) M Kolodziejová (Poland) M Kubka	4	3
(Italy) M Paoletti (Italy) L Pigato	6	6
(Italy) M Di Giuseppe (Italy) C Rosatello	6	6
2	(Chile) B Gatica (Brazil) R Pereira	1	2

Semifinals
WC	(Italy) G Crescenzi (Italy) V Meliss	4	4
D Astakhova (Latvia) D Vismane	6	6
(Italy) M Paoletti (Italy) L Pigato	7^{7}	7^{7}
(Italy) M Di Giuseppe (Italy) C Rosatello	6^{4}	6^{2}

Final
D Astakhova (Latvia) D Vismane	3	6^{7}
(Italy) M Paoletti (Italy) L Pigato	6	7^{9}
