= 2024 ATV Tennis Open =

Tennis tournament

- Date: 8–14 July 2024
- Edition: 14th
- Category: ITF Women's World Tennis Tour
- Prize money: $60,000
- Surface: Clay / Outdoor
- Location: Rome, Italy

Champions

Singles
- Oksana Selekhmeteva

Doubles
- (Switzerland) Leonie Küng / (India) Vasanti Shinde
- ATV Tennis Open

The 2024 ATV Tennis Open was a professional tennis tournament played on outdoor clay courts. It was the fourteenth edition of the tournament, which was part of the 2024 ITF Women's World Tennis Tour. It took place in Rome, Italy, between 8 and 14 July 2024.

== Champions ==
=== Singles ===
- Oksana Selekhmeteva def. (North Macedonia) Lina Gjorcheska, 6–1, 7–6^{(7–3)}

=== Doubles ===
- (Switzerland) Leonie Küng / (India) Vasanti Shinde def. (Italy) Matilde Paoletti / (Italy) Beatrice Ricci, 4–6, 6–4, [10–7]

== Singles main draw entrants ==
=== Seeds ===
Country	Player	Rank	Seed
HUN	Anna Bondár	96	1
CRO	Lea Bošković	196	2
AUS	Priscilla Hon	200	3
USA	Varvara Lepchenko	204	4
GER	Mona Barthel	208	5
CRO	Tena Lukas	226	6
MKD	Lina Gjorcheska	231	7
ESP	Guiomar Maristany	234	8

- Rankings are as of 1 July 2024.

=== Other entrants ===
The following players received wildcards into the singles main draw:

- (Italy) Georgia Pedone
- (Italy) Tatiana Pieri
- (Italy) Beatrice Ricci
- ~~(Italy) Federica Urgesi~~

The following player received entry into the singles main draw as a special exempt:

- Oksana Selekhmeteva

The following players received entry from the qualifying draw:

- (Italy) Anastasia Abbagnato
- (Switzerland) Susan Bandecchi
- (Spain) Ángela Fita Boluda
- Alevtina Ibragimova
- Maria Kozyreva
- (Romania) Gabriela Lee
- Ekaterina Maklakova
- (United States) Rasheeda McAdoo

The following player received entry into the main draw as a lucky loser:

- (Italy) Aurora Zantedeschi
