= 2015 Internazionali Femminili di Brescia – Singles =

Singles
- 2015 Internazionali Femminili di Brescia

Final
- Champion: (Liechtenstein) Stephanie Vogt
- Runner-up: (Venezuela) Andrea Gámiz
- Score: 7–6^{(7–3)}, 6–4

Events
Singles	Doubles
← 2014 ·	Internazionali Femminili di Brescia	· 2016 →

Aliaksandra Sasnovich was the defending champion, but she chose to participate at the 2015 Open Féminin de Marseille instead.

Stephanie Vogt won the title, defeating qualifier Andrea Gámiz in the final, 7–6^{(7–3)}, 6–4.

== Seeds ==
1. (Russia) Vitalia Diatchenko (quarterfinals)
2. (Slovakia) Kristína Kučová (quarterfinals)
3. (China) ~~Zhang Shuai~~ (withdrew)
4. (Romania) Sorana Cîrstea (first round)
5. (Czech Republic) Barbora Krejčíková (first round)
6. (Spain) Sara Sorribes Tormo (semifinals)
7. (Argentina) María Irigoyen (second round)
8. (Luxembourg) ~~Mandy Minella~~ (withdrew)

== Main draw ==
=== Key ===
- Q = Qualifier
- WC = Wild card
- LL = Lucky loser
- Alt = Alternate
- SE = Special exempt
- PR = Protected ranking
- ITF = ITF entry
- JE = Junior exempt
- w/o = Walkover
- r = Retired
- d = Defaulted
- SR = Special ranking

=== Finals ===
Semifinals
(Liechtenstein) Stephanie Vogt	6	2	7
6	(Spain) Sara Sorribes Tormo	1	6	5
(Switzerland) Romina Oprandi	5	4
Q	(Venezuela) Andrea Gámiz	7	6

Final
(Liechtenstein) Stephanie Vogt	7^{7}	6
Q	(Venezuela) Andrea Gámiz	6^{3}	4

=== Top half ===
First round
1	(Russia) V Diatchenko	6	5	6
(United States) A Kiick	3	7	3
(Slovenia) N Kolar	3	1
(Poland) K Piter	6	6
Q	(France) M Georges	6	6
(Argentina) P Ormaechea	2	4
(Liechtenstein) S Vogt	3	7^{7}	6
LL	(Italy) M Trevisan	6	6^{5}	4
4	(Romania) S Cîrstea	3	6	2
Q	(Italy) C Giovine	6	3	6
(Netherlands) C Burger	3	6	6
(Switzerland) V Golubic	6	4	3
WC	(Italy) J Paolini	6	2	6
(Spain) L Pous Tió	2	6	3
(Sweden) S Celik	6	2	0
6	(Spain) S Sorribes Tormo	4	6	6

Second round
1	(Russia) V Diatchenko	3	6	6
(Poland) K Piter	6	3	4
Q	(France) M Georges	7	4	4
(Liechtenstein) S Vogt	5	6	6
Q	(Italy) C Giovine	6	6
(Netherlands) C Burger	2	3
WC	(Italy) J Paolini	5	1
6	(Spain) S Sorribes Tormo	7	6

Quarterfinals
1	(Russia) V Diatchenko	4	2
(Liechtenstein) S Vogt	6	6
Q	(Italy) C Giovine	4	6^{6}
6	(Spain) S Sorribes Tormo	6	7^{8}

Semifinals
(Liechtenstein) S Vogt	6	2	7
6	(Spain) S Sorribes Tormo	1	6	5

=== Bottom half ===
First round
5	(Czech Republic) B Krejčíková	3	5
(Czech Republic) R Voráčová	6	7
(Switzerland) R Oprandi	6	6
JE	(Belarus) I Shymanovich	3	4
WC	(Italy) N Burnett	1	6	4
WC	(Italy) G Brescia	6	2	6
(Australia) O Rogowska	6	4	6
LL	(Italy) C Ferrando	4	6	1
7	(Argentina) M Irigoyen	6	6
(Greece) M Sakkari	1	4
Q	(Venezuela) A Gámiz	6	6
(Austria) P Mayr-Achleitner	4	3
WC	(Italy) M Caregaro	6^{5}	7	6
Q	(Spain) Y Cavallé Reimers	7^{7}	5	2
(Croatia) T Mrdeža	4	0
2	(Slovakia) K Kučová	6	6

Second round
(Czech Republic) R Voráčová	6^{5}	1
(Switzerland) R Oprandi	7^{7}	6
WC	(Italy) G Brescia	7^{7}	3	2
(Australia) O Rogowska	6^{4}	6	6
7	(Argentina) M Irigoyen	4	1
Q	(Venezuela) A Gámiz	6	6
WC	(Italy) M Caregaro	4	4
2	(Slovakia) K Kučová	6	6

Quarterfinals
(Switzerland) R Oprandi	6	6
(Australia) O Rogowska	2	3
Q	(Venezuela) A Gámiz	4	6	6
2	(Slovakia) K Kučová	6	1	3

Semifinals
(Switzerland) R Oprandi	5	4
Q	(Venezuela) A Gámiz	7	6
