= 2016 Internazionali Femminili di Brescia – Doubles =

Doubles
- 2016 Internazionali Femminili di Brescia

Final
- Champions: (Italy) Deborah Chiesa (Italy) Martina Colmegna
- Runners-up: (Netherlands) Cindy Burger (Liechtenstein) Stephanie Vogt
- Score: 6–3, 1–6, [12–10]

Events
Singles	Doubles
← 2015 ·	Internazionali Femminili di Brescia	· 2017 →

Laura Siegemund and Renata Voráčová were the defending champions, but both players chose not to participate.

Deborah Chiesa and Martina Colmegna won the title, defeating Cindy Burger and Stephanie Vogt in the final, 6–3, 1–6, [12–10].

== Seeds ==
1. (Georgia (country)) Ekaterine Gorgodze / (Georgia (country)) Sofia Shapatava (semifinals)
2. (Netherlands) Cindy Burger / (Liechtenstein) Stephanie Vogt (final)
3. (Turkey) Başak Eraydın / (Italy) Alice Matteucci (semifinals)
4. (Argentina) Catalina Pella / (Chile) Daniela Seguel (quarterfinals)

== Draw ==
=== Key ===
- Q = Qualifier
- WC = Wild card
- LL = Lucky loser
- Alt = Alternate
- SE = Special exempt
- PR = Protected ranking
- ITF = ITF entry
- JE = Junior exempt
- w/o = Walkover
- r = Retired
- d = Defaulted
- SR = Special ranking

First round
(Italy) N Burnett (Italy) C Ferrando	1
(United States) J Jones (United States) S Santamaria	0^{r}
4	(Argentina) C Pella (Chile) D Seguel	6	6
(Uzbekistan) A Amanmuradova (Italy) C Giovine	1	1
(Italy) A Balducci (Italy) A Brianti	0	4
(Italy) D Chiesa (Italy) M Colmegna	6	6
(Brazil) B Haddad Maia (Bulgaria) V Tomova	6	6
(Mexico) V Rodríguez (Mexico) AS Sánchez	1	0
(Italy) F Bonometti (Italy) E Lioi
3	(Turkey) B Eraydın (Italy) A Matteucci	w/o
(Argentina) P Ormaechea (Poland) K Piter	5	1
(Germany) A Klasen (Austria) S Klemenschits	7	6
(Italy) G Brescia (Spain) S Sorribes Tormo
2	(Netherlands) C Burger (Liechtenstein) S Vogt	w/o

Quarterfinals
1	(Georgia (country)) E Gorgodze (Georgia (country)) S Shapatava	6	7^{9}
(Italy) N Burnett (Italy) C Ferrando	2	6^{7}
4	(Argentina) C Pella (Chile) D Seguel	4	6	[7]
(Italy) D Chiesa (Italy) M Colmegna	6	2	[10]
(Brazil) B Haddad Maia (Bulgaria) V Tomova
3	(Turkey) B Eraydın (Italy) A Matteucci	w/o
(Germany) A Klasen (Austria) S Klemenschits	3	6	[6]
2	(Netherlands) C Burger (Liechtenstein) S Vogt	6	2	[10]

Semifinals
1	(Georgia (country)) E Gorgodze (Georgia (country)) S Shapatava	4	1
(Italy) D Chiesa (Italy) M Colmegna	6	6
3	(Turkey) B Eraydın (Italy) A Matteucci	6	3	[6]
2	(Netherlands) C Burger (Liechtenstein) S Vogt	1	6	[10]

Final
(Italy) D Chiesa (Italy) M Colmegna	6	1	[12]
2	(Netherlands) C Burger (Liechtenstein) S Vogt	3	6	[10]
