= 2021 Swedish Open – Men's singles =

Swedish Open player

Men's singles
- 2021 Swedish Open

Final
- Champion: (Norway) Casper Ruud
- Runner-up: (Argentina) Federico Coria
- Score: 6–3, 6–3

Details
- Draw: 28 (4Q / 3WC)
- Seeds: 8

Events
Singles	men	women
Doubles	men	women
← 2019 ·	Swedish Open	· 2022 →

Nicolás Jarry was the reigning champion from when the tournament was last held in 2019, but chose to not defend his title.

Casper Ruud won the title, defeating Federico Coria in the final, 6–3, 6–3.

== Seeds ==
The top four seeds receive a bye into the second round.

1. (Norway) Casper Ruud (champion)
2. (Chile) Cristian Garín (quarterfinals)
3. (Italy) Fabio Fognini (second round)
4. (Australia) John Millman (second round)
5. (France) Richard Gasquet (first round)
6. (Italy) Lorenzo Musetti (first round)
7. (Czech Republic) Jiří Veselý (second round)
8. (Finland) Emil Ruusuvuori (second round)

== Draw ==
=== Key ===
- Q = Qualifier
- WC = Wild card
- LL = Lucky loser
- Alt = Alternate
- SE = Special exempt
- PR = Protected ranking
- ITF = ITF entry
- JE = Junior exempt
- w/o = Walkover
- r = Retired
- d = Defaulted
- SR = Special ranking

=== Finals ===
Semifinals
1	(Norway) Casper Ruud	6	6
(Spain) Roberto Carballés Baena	1	4
(Germany) Yannick Hanfmann	2	1
(Argentina) Federico Coria	6	6

Final
1	(Norway) Casper Ruud	6	6
(Argentina) Federico Coria	3	3

=== Top half ===
First round
(Moldova) R Albot	6	3	0
WC	(Denmark) H Rune	4	6	6
WC	(Sweden) E Ymer	6	6^{6}	6
(Japan) T Daniel	2	7^{8}	4
Q	(Switzerland) H Laaksonen	6	3	6
6	(Italy) L Musetti	2	6	4
(Argentina) F Bagnis	2	4
(Spain) R Carballés Baena	6	6
(Uruguay) P Cuevas	6	6^{4}	2
(Slovakia) N Gombos	1	7^{7}	6
WC	(Sweden) M Ymer	6	4	3
8	(Finland) E Ruusuvuori	1	6	6

Second round
1	(Norway) C Ruud	6	6
WC	(Denmark) H Rune	0	2
WC	(Sweden) E Ymer	2	5
Q	(Switzerland) H Laaksonen	6	7
3	(Italy) F Fognini	3	6	4
(Spain) R Carballés Baena	6	1	6
(Slovakia) N Gombos	6	6
8	(Finland) E Ruusuvuori	2	4

Quarterfinals
1	(Norway) C Ruud	w/o
Q	(Switzerland) H Laaksonen
(Spain) R Carballés Baena	6	6
(Slovakia) N Gombos	4	2

Semifinals
1	(Norway) C Ruud	6	6
(Spain) R Carballés Baena	1	4

=== Bottom half ===
First round
7	(Czech Republic) J Veselý	6	6
(Italy) S Caruso	3	2
(Germany) Y Hanfmann	6	7
(Brazil) T Monteiro	2	5
(Portugal) P Sousa	1	1
Q	(France) A Rinderknech	6	6
5	(France) R Gasquet	2	7	3
(Italy) M Cecchinato	6	5	6
(Argentina) F Coria	6	6
Q	(Argentina) F Cerúndolo	4	4
Q	(Austria) D Novak	5	1
(Spain) P Martínez	7	6

Second round
7	(Czech Republic) J Veselý	4	3
(Germany) Y Hanfmann	6	6
Q	(France) A Rinderknech	6	3	6
4	(Australia) J Millman	3	6	3
(Italy) M Cecchinato	6	4	3
(Argentina) F Coria	4	6	6
(Spain) P Martínez	3	3
2	(Chile) C Garín	6	6

Quarterfinals
(Germany) Y Hanfmann	6	6
Q	(France) A Rinderknech	4	3
(Argentina) F Coria	6	4	6
2	(Chile) C Garín	4	6	2

Semifinals
(Germany) Y Hanfmann	2	1
(Argentina) F Coria	6	6

== Qualifying ==
=== Seeds ===
1. (France) Arthur Rinderknech (qualified)
2. (Slovakia) Andrej Martin (qualifying competition)
3. (Argentina) Francisco Cerúndolo (qualified)
4. (Austria) Dennis Novak (qualified)
5. (Switzerland) Henri Laaksonen (qualified)
6. (Switzerland) Marc-Andrea Hüsler (qualifying competition)
7. (Slovenia) Blaž Rola (qualifying competition)
8. (Italy) Thomas Fabbiano (qualifying competition)

=== Qualifiers ===
1. (France) Arthur Rinderknech
2. (Switzerland) Henri Laaksonen
3. (Argentina) Francisco Cerúndolo
4. (Austria) Dennis Novak

=== Qualifying draw ===
==== First qualifier ====
First round
1	(France) Arthur Rinderknech	6	7
(Brazil) Oscar José Gutierrez	4	5
(Sweden) Markus Eriksson	6^{6}	4
8	(Italy) Thomas Fabbiano	7^{8}	6

Qualifying competition
1	(France) Arthur Rinderknech	6	6
8	(Italy) Thomas Fabbiano	3	2

==== Second qualifier ====
First round
2	(Slovakia) Andrej Martin	7^{7}	3	7
(Italy) Andrea Vavassori	6^{0}	6	5
(Japan) Yosuke Watanuki	7^{7}	5	5
5/Alt	(Switzerland) Henri Laaksonen	6^{4}	7	7

Qualifying competition
2	(Slovakia) Andrej Martin	7	3	4
5/Alt	(Switzerland) Henri Laaksonen	5	6	6

==== Third qualifier ====
First round
3	(Argentina) Francisco Cerúndolo	6	6
WC	(Sweden) Leo Borg	3	1
WC	(Sweden) Carl Söderlund	6	2	0
7	(Slovenia) Blaž Rola	4	6	6

Qualifying competition
3	(Argentina) Francisco Cerúndolo	3	6	7^{7}
7	(Slovenia) Blaž Rola	6	4	6^{2}

==== Fourth qualifier ====
First round
4	(Austria) Dennis Novak	6	6
(Norway) Viktor Durasovic	2	4
(Italy) Roberto Marcora	6	4	3
6	(Switzerland) Marc-Andrea Hüsler	3	6	6

Qualifying competition
4	(Austria) Dennis Novak	6	6
6	(Switzerland) Marc-Andrea Hüsler	2	2
