= 2016 Internazionali Femminili di Brescia – Singles =

Singles
- 2016 Internazionali Femminili di Brescia

Final
- Champion: (Italy) Karin Knapp
- Runner-up: (Czech Republic) Jesika Malečková
- Score: 6–1, 6–2

Events
Singles	Doubles
← 2015 ·	Internazionali Femminili di Brescia	· 2017 →

Stephanie Vogt was the defending champion, but lost in the first round to Karin Knapp.

Knapp then went on to win the title, defeating Jesika Malečková in the final, 6–1, 6–2.

== Seeds ==
1. (Italy) Karin Knapp (champion)
2. (Japan) Risa Ozaki (first round)
3. (Switzerland) Romina Oprandi (quarterfinals, retired)
4. (Ukraine) Maryna Zanevska (quarterfinals, retired)
5. (Austria) Barbara Haas (semifinals)
6. (Netherlands) Cindy Burger (quarterfinals)
7. (Spain) Sara Sorribes Tormo (second round)
8. (United States) Kristie Ahn (first round)

== Main draw ==
=== Key ===
- Q = Qualifier
- WC = Wild card
- LL = Lucky loser
- Alt = Alternate
- SE = Special exempt
- PR = Protected ranking
- ITF = ITF entry
- JE = Junior exempt
- w/o = Walkover
- r = Retired
- d = Defaulted
- SR = Special ranking

=== Finals ===
Semifinals
1	(Italy) Karin Knapp	7^{7}	6
(Sweden) Susanne Celik	6^{3}	1
5	(Austria) Barbara Haas	3	0
(Czech Republic) Jesika Malečková	6	6

Final
1	(Italy) Karin Knapp	6	6
(Czech Republic) Jesika Malečková	1	2

=== Top half ===
First round
1	(Italy) K Knapp	6	6
(Liechtenstein) S Vogt	3	0
(Georgia (country)) S Shapatava	6	6
Q	(Mexico) AS Sánchez	3	1
WC	(Italy) G Brescia	3	0^{r}
Q	(Bulgaria) V Tomova	6	2
(Spain) L Pous Tió	5	5
7	(Spain) S Sorribes Tormo	7	7
3	(Switzerland) R Oprandi	7^{7}	6^{4}	7^{7}
WC	(Italy) C Giovine	6^{1}	7^{7}	6^{3}
WC	(Italy) N Burnett	6^{5}	2
(Argentina) C Pella	7^{7}	6
(Mexico) V Rodríguez	2	6	6
(Russia) M Melnikova	6	3	0
(Sweden) S Celik	7	6
8	(United States) K Ahn	5	2

Second round
1	(Italy) K Knapp	6	6
(Georgia (country)) S Shapatava	2	3
Q	(Bulgaria) V Tomova	6^{2}	7	6
7	(Spain) S Sorribes Tormo	7^{7}	5	4
3	(Switzerland) R Oprandi	6	4	6
(Argentina) C Pella	3	6	3
(Mexico) V Rodríguez	4	6	1
(Sweden) S Celik	6	4	6

Quarterfinals
1	(Italy) K Knapp	6	6
Q	(Bulgaria) V Tomova	3	0
3	(Switzerland) R Oprandi	6^{4}	1^{r}
(Sweden) S Celik	7^{7}	4

Semifinals
1	(Italy) K Knapp	7^{7}	6
(Sweden) S Celik	6^{3}	1

=== Bottom half ===
First round
5	(Austria) B Haas	3	6	7^{7}
WC	(Italy) C Ferrando	6	1	6^{5}
(Romania) C Dinu	6	6
(Turkey) B Eraydın	4	4
(Poland) K Piter	2	2
(Estonia) K Kanepi	6	6
(Chile) D Seguel	6	4	2
4	(Ukraine) M Zanevska	4	6	6
6	(Netherlands) C Burger	6	6^{11}	6
(France) M Georges	4	7^{13}	4
(Paraguay) M González	1	3
Q	(Brazil) B Haddad Maia	6	6
(Spain) P Badosa Gibert	6	6^{3}	6
Q	(Austria) J Grabher	2	7^{7}	1
(Czech Republic) J Malečková	6	6
2	(Japan) R Ozaki	4	2

Second round
5	(Austria) B Haas	4	6	6
(Romania) C Dinu	6	4	4
(Estonia) K Kanepi	6	4	3
4	(Ukraine) M Zanevska	4	6	6
6	(Netherlands) C Burger	3
Q	(Brazil) B Haddad Maia	1^{r}
(Spain) P Badosa Gibert	3	4
(Czech Republic) J Malečková	6	6

Quarterfinals
5	(Austria) B Haas	4
4	(Ukraine) M Zanevska	0^{r}
6	(Netherlands) C Burger	5	5
(Czech Republic) J Malečková	7	7

Semifinals
5	(Austria) B Haas	3	0
(Czech Republic) J Malečková	6	6
