= 2016 Internazionali Femminili di Brescia =

- Date: 30 May–5 June
- Edition: 9th
- Category: ITF Women's Circuit
- Prize money: $50,000
- Surface: Clay
- Location: Brescia, Italy

Champions

Singles
- (Italy) Karin Knapp

Doubles
- (Italy) Deborah Chiesa / (Italy) Martina Colmegna
- Internazionali Femminili di Brescia

The 2016 Internazionali Femminili di Brescia was a professional tennis tournament played on outdoor clay courts. It was the ninth edition of the tournament and part of the 2016 ITF Women's Circuit, offering a total of $50,000 in prize money. It took place in Brescia, Italy, on 30 May–5 June 2016.

== Singles main draw entrants ==
=== Seeds ===
Country	Player	Rank^{1}	Seed
ITA	Karin Knapp	118	1
JPN	Risa Ozaki	128	2
SUI	Romina Oprandi	137	3
UKR	Maryna Zanevska	141	4
AUT	Barbara Haas	168	5
NED	Cindy Burger	173	6
ESP	Sara Sorribes Tormo	191	7
USA	Kristie Ahn	193	8

- ^{1} Rankings as of 23 May 2016.

=== Other entrants ===
The following player received a wildcard into the singles main draw:

- (Italy) Georgia Brescia
- (Italy) Nastassja Burnett
- (Italy) Cristiana Ferrando
- (Italy) Claudia Giovine

The following players received entry from the qualifying draw:

- (Austria) Julia Grabher
- (Brazil) Beatriz Haddad Maia
- (Mexico) Ana Sofía Sánchez
- (Bulgaria) Viktoriya Tomova

== Champions ==
=== Singles ===
- (Italy) Karin Knapp def. (Czech Republic) Jesika Malečková, 6–1, 6–2

=== Doubles ===
- (Italy) Deborah Chiesa / (Italy) Martina Colmegna def. (Netherlands) Cindy Burger / (Liechtenstein) Stephanie Vogt, 6–3, 1–6, [12–10]
