= 2021 Swedish Open – Men's doubles =

Tennis tournament

Men's doubles
- 2021 Swedish Open

Final
- Champion: (Netherlands) Sander Arends (Netherlands) David Pel
- Runner-up: (Germany) Andre Begemann (France) Albano Olivetti
- Score: 6–4, 6–2

Events
Singles	men	women
Doubles	men	women
← 2019 ·	Swedish Open	· 2022 →

Sander Gillé and Joran Vliegen were the reigning champions from when the tournament was last held in 2019, but chose not to defend their title.

Sander Arends and David Pel won the title, defeating Andre Begemann and Albano Olivetti in the final, 6–4, 6–2.

== Seeds ==
1. (Argentina) Andrés Molteni / (Italy) Andrea Vavassori (quarterfinals)
2. (Sweden) André Göransson / (Denmark) Frederik Nielsen (quarterfinals)
3. (Uruguay) Pablo Cuevas / (France) Fabrice Martin (semifinals)
4. (United States) Nicholas Monroe / (Belarus) Andrei Vasilevski (quarterfinals)

== Draw ==
=== Key ===
- Q = Qualifier
- WC = Wild card
- LL = Lucky loser
- Alt = Alternate
- ITF = ITF entry
- PR = Protected ranking
- SR = Special ranking
- SE = Special exempt
- JE = Junior exempt
- JR = Junior Accelerator Programme entrant
- CO = College Accelerator Programme entrant
- NG = Next Gen Accelerator Program entrant
- w/o = Walkover
- r = Retired
- d = Defaulted

=== Draw ===
First round
1	(Argentina) A Molteni (Italy) A Vavassori	6	6
(Moldova) R Albot (Ukraine) D Molchanov	1	2
(Brazil) R Matos (Brazil) T Monteiro	3	6	[1]
(Germany) A Begemann (France) A Olivetti	6	2	[10]
4	(United States) N Monroe (Belarus) A Vasilevski	7^{7}	6
(Monaco) R Arneodo (Slovakia) I Zelenay	6^{5}	4
(Spain) R Carballés Baena (Italy) M Cecchinato	6	6
WC	(Sweden) C Söderlund (Sweden) E Ymer	2	4
(India) J Nedunchezhiyan (India) P Raja	7	3	[6]
WC	(Sweden) F Bergevi (Sweden) M Eriksson	5	6	[10]
(Czech Republic) R Jebavý (Czech Republic) J Veselý	6	1	[5]
3	(Uruguay) P Cuevas (France) F Martin	3	6	[10]
(Netherlands) S Arends (Netherlands) D Pel	6	6
(Venezuela) LD Martínez (New Zealand) A Sitak	1	4
(Argentina) F Bagnis (Argentina) F Coria	4	3
2	(Sweden) A Göransson (Denmark) F Nielsen	6	6

Quarterfinals
1	(Argentina) A Molteni (Italy) A Vavassori	6	4	[3]
(Germany) A Begemann (France) A Olivetti	3	6	[10]
4	(United States) N Monroe (Belarus) A Vasilevski	6	5	[8]
(Spain) R Carballés Baena (Italy) M Cecchinato	3	7	[10]
WC	(Sweden) F Bergevi (Sweden) M Eriksson	3	6	[6]
3	(Uruguay) P Cuevas (France) F Martin	6	3	[10]
(Netherlands) S Arends (Netherlands) D Pel	6	6
2	(Sweden) A Göransson (Denmark) F Nielsen	2	2

Semifinals
(Germany) A Begemann (France) A Olivetti	w/o
(Spain) R Carballés Baena (Italy) M Cecchinato
3	(Uruguay) P Cuevas (France) F Martin	6	5	[7]
(Netherlands) S Arends (Netherlands) D Pel	2	7	[10]

Final
(Germany) A Begemann (France) A Olivetti	4	2
(Netherlands) S Arends (Netherlands) D Pel	6	6
