= 2015 Internazionali Femminili di Brescia =

- Date: 1–7 June
- Edition: 8th
- Category: ITF Women's Circuit
- Prize money: $50,000
- Surface: Clay
- Location: Brescia, Italy

Champions

Singles
- (Liechtenstein) Stephanie Vogt

Doubles
- (Germany) Laura Siegemund / (Czech Republic) Renata Voráčová
- Internazionali Femminili di Brescia

The 2015 Internazionali Femminili di Brescia was a professional tennis tournament played on outdoor clay courts. It was the eighth edition of the tournament and part of the 2015 ITF Women's Circuit, offering a total of $50,000 in prize money. It took place in Brescia, Italy, on 1–7 June 2015.

== Singles main draw entrants ==
=== Seeds ===
Country	Player	Rank^{1}	Seed
RUS	Vitalia Diatchenko	91	1
SVK	Kristína Kučová	121	2
~~CHN~~	~~Zhang Shuai~~	~~122~~	~~3~~
ROU	Sorana Cîrstea	144	4
CZE	Barbora Krejčíková	146	5
ESP	Sara Sorribes Tormo	156	6
ARG	María Irigoyen	161	7
~~LUX~~	~~Mandy Minella~~	~~170~~	~~8~~

- ^{1} Rankings as of 25 May 2015

=== Other entrants ===
The following players received wildcards into the singles main draw:

- (Italy) Georgia Brescia
- (Italy) Nastassja Burnett
- (Italy) Martina Caregaro
- (Italy) Jasmine Paolini

The following players received entry from the qualifying draw:

- (Spain) Yvonne Cavallé Reimers
- (Venezuela) Andrea Gámiz
- (France) Myrtille Georges
- (Italy) Claudia Giovine

The following players received entry by lucky loser spots:

- (Italy) Cristiana Ferrando
- (Italy) Martina Trevisan

The following player received entry by a junior exempt:

- (Belarus) Iryna Shymanovich

== Champions ==
=== Singles ===
- (Liechtenstein) Stephanie Vogt def. (Venezuela) Andrea Gámiz, 7–6^{(7–3)}, 6–4

=== Doubles ===
- (Germany) Laura Siegemund / (Czech Republic) Renata Voráčová def. (Argentina) María Irigoyen / (Liechtenstein) Stephanie Vogt, 6–2, 6–1
