= 2021 Swedish Open – Women's doubles =

Women's doubles
- 2021 Swedish Open

Final
- Champions: (Sweden) Mirjam Björklund (Switzerland) Leonie Küng
- Runners-up: (Slovakia) Tereza Mihalíková (Russia) Kamilla Rakhimova
- Score: 5–7, 6–3, [10–5]

Events
Singles	men	women
Doubles	men	women
- Swedish Open

Misaki Doi and Natalia Vikhlyantseva were the defending champions but Doi chose not to participate. Vikhlyantseva played alongside Olga Govortsova but lost in the first round to Cornelia Lister and Erin Routliffe.

Mirjam Björklund and Leonie Küng won the title, defeating Tereza Mihalíková and Kamilla Rakhimova in the final, 5–7, 6–3, [10–5].

== Seeds ==
1. (Spain) Lara Arruabarrena / (Spain) Aliona Bolsova (quarterfinals, withdrew)
2. (Sweden) Cornelia Lister / (New Zealand) Erin Routliffe (semifinals)
3. (Slovakia) Tereza Mihalíková / (Russia) Kamilla Rakhimova (final)
4. (Hungary) Anna Bondár / (Romania) Jaqueline Cristian (quarterfinals, withdrew)

== Draw ==
Key

- Q = Qualifier
- WC = Wild card
- LL = Lucky loser
- Alt = Alternate
- ITF = ITF entry
- PR = Protected ranking
- SR = Special ranking
- SE = Special exempt
- JE = Junior exempt
- JR = Junior Accelerator Programme entrant
- CO = College Accelerator Programme entrant
- NG = Next Gen Accelerator Program entrant
- w/o = Walkover
- r = Retired
- d = Defaulted

=== Draw ===
First round
1	(Spain) L Arruabarrena (Spain) A Bolsova	7	6
(Italy) G Gatto-Monticone (Spain) N Párrizas Díaz	5	4
(Sweden) R Peterson (Egypt) M Sherif	7^{7}	6
(Ukraine) K Kozlova (United States) K Volynets	6^{5}	4
3	(Slovakia) T Mihalíková (Russia) K Rakhimova	w/o
(Russia) A Kalinskaya (Slovakia) AK Schmiedlová
(United States) Q Gleason (Indonesia) J Rompies	6	1	[10]
(Indonesia) B Gumulya (Chinese Taipei) Y-c Hsieh	3	6	[6]
(Sweden) M Björklund (Switzerland) L Küng	7	6
(Sweden) Vanessa Ersöz (Sweden) F Östlund	5	2
(Romania) M Buzărnescu (United States) V Lepchenko	4	6	[5]
4	(Hungary) A Bondár (Romania) J Cristian	6	3	[10]
Alt	(India) K Thandi (Slovakia) Z Zlochová	5	7^{7}	[11]
(Sweden) C Hennemann (Sweden) Lisa Zaar	7	6^{5}	[9]
(Belarus) O Govortsova (Russia) N Vikhlyantseva	2	6	[8]
2	(Sweden) C Lister (New Zealand) E Routliffe	6	4	[10]

Quarterfinals
1	(Spain) L Arruabarrena (Spain) A Bolsova
(Sweden) R Peterson (Egypt) M Sherif	w/o
3	(Slovakia) T Mihalíková (Russia) K Rakhimova	6	6
(United States) Q Gleason (Indonesia) J Rompies	2	2
(Sweden) M Björklund (Switzerland) L Küng	w/o
4	(Hungary) A Bondár (Romania) J Cristian
Alt	(India) K Thandi (Slovakia) Z Zlochová	6^{6}	6	[4]
2	(Sweden) C Lister (New Zealand) E Routliffe	7^{8}	2	[10]

Semifinals
(Sweden) R Peterson (Egypt) M Sherif
3	(Slovakia) T Mihalíková (Russia) K Rakhimova	w/o
(Sweden) M Björklund (Switzerland) L Küng	2	6	[11]
2	(Sweden) C Lister (New Zealand) E Routliffe	6	2	[9]

Final
3	(Slovakia) T Mihalíková (Russia) K Rakhimova	7	3	[5]
(Sweden) M Björklund (Switzerland) L Küng	5	6	[10]
