= 2023 BMW Roma Cup – Doubles =

Doubles
- 2023 BMW Roma Cup

Final
- Champions: (Italy) Angelica Moratelli (Italy) Camilla Rosatello
- Runners-up: (Romania) Oana Gavrilă (Greece) Sapfo Sakellaridi
- Score: 3–6, 6–0, [10–7]

Events
Singles	Doubles
- BMW Roma Cup

Matilde Paoletti and Lisa Pigato were the defending champions but chose not to participate.

Angelica Moratelli and Camilla Rosatello won the title, defeating Oana Gavrilă and Sapfo Sakellaridi in the final, 3–6, 6–0, [10–7].

== Seeds ==
1. (Italy) Angelica Moratelli / (Italy) Camilla Rosatello (champions)
2. (Romania) Oana Gavrilă / (Greece) Sapfo Sakellaridi (final)
3. (United States) Jessie Aney / (United States) Adriana Reami (first round)
4. (United States) Christina Rosca / (Australia) Astra Sharma (semifinals)

== Draw ==
Key

- Q = Qualifier
- WC = Wild card
- LL = Lucky loser
- Alt = Alternate
- ITF = ITF entry
- PR = Protected ranking
- SR = Special ranking
- SE = Special exempt
- JE = Junior exempt
- JR = Junior Accelerator Programme entrant
- CO = College Accelerator Programme entrant
- NG = Next Gen Accelerator Program entrant
- w/o = Walkover
- r = Retired
- d = Defaulted

First round
1	(Italy) A Moratelli (Italy) C Rosatello	6	5	[10]
(United States) F Di Lorenzo (Mexico) R Zarazúa	3	7	[7]
A Korneeva (Croatia) P Marčinko	3	6^{2}
(Argentina) G Naya (Italy) A Zantedeschi	6	7^{7}
3	(United States) J Aney (United States) A Reami	5	7	[4]
(Brazil) A Candiotto (Brazil) R Pereira	7	5	[10]
WC	(Italy) E Alvisi (Italy) D Spiteri	w/o
(Romania) C Dinu (Norway) M Helgø
WC	(Germany) C Brack (Italy) F Marchiani	w/o
(Czech Republic) L Havlíčková (Czech Republic) B Palicová
(Serbia) T Čurović; K Zaytseva	7	5	[6]
4	(United States) C Rosca (Australia) A Sharma	5	7	[10]
(Romania) A Prisăcariu (Romania) L Tănăsie
(Germany) N Siedliska (Bulgaria) J Terziyska	w/o
WC	(Italy) G Crescenzi (Italy) V Meliss	3	6	[14]
2	(Romania) O Gavrilă (Greece) S Sakellaridi	6	4	[16]

Quarterfinals
1	(Italy) A Moratelli (Italy) C Rosatello	6	6
(Argentina) G Naya (Italy) A Zantedeschi	3	3
(Brazil) A Candiotto (Brazil) R Pereira	1	5
WC	(Italy) E Alvisi (Italy) D Spiteri	6	7
WC	(Germany) C Brack (Italy) F Marchiani	2	1
4	(United States) C Rosca (Australia) A Sharma	6	6
(Germany) N Siedliska (Bulgaria) J Terziyska	4	5
2	(Romania) O Gavrilă (Greece) S Sakellaridi	6	7

Semifinals
1	(Italy) A Moratelli (Italy) C Rosatello	2	6	[10]
WC	(Italy) E Alvisi (Italy) D Spiteri	6	4	[3]
4	(United States) C Rosca (Australia) A Sharma	1	6	[9]
2	(Romania) O Gavrilă (Greece) S Sakellaridi	6	3	[11]

Final
1	(Italy) A Moratelli (Italy) C Rosatello	3	6	[10]
2	(Romania) O Gavrilă (Greece) S Sakellaridi	6	0	[7]
