= 2023 BMW Roma Cup – Singles =

Singles
- 2023 BMW Roma Cup

Final
- Champion: (Croatia) Petra Marčinko
- Runner-up: (Italy) Georgia Pedone
- Score: 6–2, 6–2

Events
Singles	Doubles
- BMW Roma Cup

Tena Lukas was the defending champion but lost in the first round to Anna Turati.

Petra Marčinko won the title, defeating Georgia Pedone in the final, 6–2, 6–2.

== Seeds ==
1. (Italy) Lucia Bronzetti (second round)
2. (Japan) Moyuka Uchijima (first round)
3. (France) Kristina Mladenovic (first round, retired)
4. (France) Chloé Paquet (second round)
5. (Czech Republic) Lucie Havlíčková (first round)
6. (Czech Republic) Barbora Palicová (first round)
7. (Mexico) Renata Zarazúa (second round)
8. (France) Audrey Albié (first round)

== Draw ==
Key

- Q = Qualifier
- WC = Wild card
- LL = Lucky loser
- Alt = Alternate
- ITF = ITF entry
- PR = Protected ranking
- SR = Special ranking
- SE = Special exempt
- JE = Junior exempt
- JR = Junior Accelerator Programme entrant
- CO = College Accelerator Programme entrant
- NG = Next Gen Accelerator Program entrant
- w/o = Walkover
- r = Retired
- d = Defaulted

=== Finals ===
Semifinals
WC	(Italy) Georgia Pedone	6	6
(Italy) Silvia Ambrosio	4	3
(Greece) Sapfo Sakellaridi	2	3
(Croatia) Petra Marčinko	6	6

Final
WC	(Italy) Georgia Pedone	2	2
(Croatia) Petra Marčinko	6	6

=== Top half ===
First round
1	(Italy) L Bronzetti	6	6
WC	(Germany) C Brack	1	0
Q	(Italy) A Turati	7	6
(Croatia) T Lukas	5	2
Q	(Bulgaria) J Terziyska	3	3
Q	(Australia) TN Smith	6	6
WC	(Italy) G Pedone	6	7
8	(France) A Albié	3	5
4	(France) C Paquet	6	7^{7}
Q	A Kovaleva	1	6^{1}
WC	(Italy) D Valente	1	1
Q	(Argentina) G Naya	6	6
(Italy) S Ambrosio	6	6
(Italy) C Rosatello	0	0
(Romania) C Dinu	6	2	6
6	(Czech Republic) B Palicová	3	6	4

Second round
1	(Italy) L Bronzetti	7^{7}	4	4
Q	(Italy) A Turati	6^{5}	6	6
Q	(Australia) TN Smith	2	1
WC	(Italy) G Pedone	6	6
4	(France) C Paquet	2	6^{3}
Q	(Argentina) G Naya	6	7^{7}
(Italy) S Ambrosio	6	6
(Romania) C Dinu	0	2

Quarterfinals
Q	(Italy) A Turati	3	2
WC	(Italy) G Pedone	6	6
Q	(Argentina) G Naya	2	1
(Italy) S Ambrosio	6	6

Semifinals
WC	(Italy) G Pedone	6	6
(Italy) S Ambrosio	4	3

=== Bottom half ===
First round
7	(Mexico) R Zarazúa	6	6
(United States) F Di Lorenzo	1	3
(Brazil) G Cé	6	6
Q	(United States) C Rosca	2	1
LL	(Italy) A Moratelli	5	3
Q	(Italy) A Zantedeschi	7	6
(Greece) S Sakellaridi	7	1
3	(France) K Mladenovic	5	0^{r}
5	(Czech Republic) L Havlíčková	3	5
(Australia) A Sharma	6	7
(Romania) A Prisăcariu	5	3
A Korneeva	7	6
(Croatia) P Marčinko	6	6
Q	(Germany) N Siedliska	3	0
WC	(Italy) D Spiteri	6	7
2	(Japan) M Uchijima	4	5

Second round
7	(Mexico) R Zarazúa	2	6^{3}
(Brazil) G Cé	6	7^{7}
Q	(Italy) A Zantedeschi	3	3
(Greece) S Sakellaridi	6	6
(Australia) A Sharma	6	6
A Korneeva	4	1
(Croatia) P Marčinko	6	6
WC	(Italy) D Spiteri	1	4

Quarterfinals
(Brazil) G Cé	3	5
(Greece) S Sakellaridi	6	7
(Australia) A Sharma	1	6^{4}
(Croatia) P Marčinko	6	7^{7}

Semifinals
(Greece) S Sakellaridi	2	3
(Croatia) P Marčinko	6	6
