= Vasanti Shinde =

Indian tennis player

- Country (sports): India
- Born: 18 February 1997 (age 29) Pune, India
- Plays: Left (two-handed backhand)
- Prize money: $25,336

Singles
- Career record: 36–61
- Highest ranking: No. 1179 (22 May 2023)

Doubles
- Career record: 63–87
- Highest ranking: No. 211 (19 August 2024)
- Current ranking: No. 552 (15 June 2026)
- Last updated on: 14 June 2026.

Vasanti Shinde (born 18 February 1997) is a professional Indian tennis player.

Shinde has a career-high doubles ranking by the WTA of 211, achieved on 19 August 2024.

Partnering Leonie Küng, Shinde won her first $75k tournament in July 2024 at the ITF event in Roma, Italy.

== ITF finals ==
=== Doubles: 9 (2 title, 7 runner-ups) ===
Legend
W60/75 tournaments
W40/50 tournaments
W25/35 tournaments
W15 tournaments

Result	W–L	Date	Tournament	Tier	Surface	Partner	Opponents	Score
Loss	0–1	Nov 2021	ITF Lousada, Portugal	W15	Hard (i)	(Portugal) Inês Murta	(Netherlands) Jasmijn Gimbrère (Switzerland) Naïma Karamoko	w/o
Loss	0–2	Jun 2023	ITF Madrid, Spain	W25	Hard	(China) Li Zongyu	(United States) Dalayna Hewitt (United States) Alana Smith	6–4, 2–6, [6–10]
Loss	0–3	Sep 2023	ITF Saint-Palais-sur-Mer, France	W40	Clay	(France) Victoria Muntean	(United Kingdom) Emily Appleton (Ukraine) Valeriya Strakhova	1–6, 2–6
Loss	0–4	Mar 2024	ITF Terrassa, Spain	W35	Clay	(Spain) Yvonne Cavallé Reimers	(Slovenia) Nika Radišić (Bosnia and Herzegovina) Anita Wagner	5–7, 6–7^{(7)}
Loss	0–5	Apr 2024	ITF Santa Margherita di Pula, Italy	W35	Clay	(Greece) Sapfo Sakellaridi	(Spain) Yvonne Cavallé Reimers (Italy) Aurora Zantedeschi	6–3, 4–6, [9–11]
Win	1–5	Jul 2024	Rome Open, Italy	W75	Clay	(Switzerland) Leonie Küng	(Italy) Matilde Paoletti (Italy) Beatrice Ricci	4–6, 6–4, [10–7]
Loss	1–6	Nov 2025	ITF Faro, Portugal	W35	Hard	(Latvia) Elza Tomase	(Germany) Josy Daems (Germany) Mina Hodzic	3–6, 7–5^{(5)}, [9–11]
Loss	1–7	Jun 2026	Morocco Tennis Tour – Casablanca, Morocco	W35	Clay	Elina Nepliy	(United States) Madison Sieg (Slovakia) Nina Vargová	6–7^{(1)}, 1–6
Win	2–7	Jun 2026	Morocco Tennis Tour – Mohammedia, Morocco	W35	Clay	Elina Nepliy	(Italy) Martina Colmegna (Italy) Federica Sacco	3–6, 6–4, [10–4]
