= Martina Colmegna =

Italian tennis player (born 1996)

- Country (sports): Italy
- Born: 10 December 1996 (age 29)
- Plays: Right (two-handed backhand)
- Prize money: $155,889

Singles
- Career record: 314–234
- Career titles: 4 ITF
- Highest ranking: No. 347 (27 February 2023)
- Current ranking: No. 391 (25 May 2026)

Doubles
- Career record: 203–122
- Career titles: 23 ITF
- Highest ranking: No. 185 (17 June 2019)
- Current ranking: No. 808 (25 May 2026)
- Last updated on: 6 June 2026.

Martina Colmegna (born 10 December 1996) is an Italian professional tennis player.

Colmegna has career-high WTA rankings of 347 in singles, achieved 27 February 2023, and No. 185 in doubles, set on 17 June 2019. She has won four singles titles and 23 doubles titles on the ITF Women's Circuit.

Her most important title she realized at the $50k event in Brescia in 2016, partnering Deborah Chiesa, when they defeated Cindy Burger and Stephanie Vogt in the final, in three sets.

== ITF Circuit finals ==
=== Singles: 13 (4 titles, 9 runner-ups) ===
Legend W35 tournaments W10/15 tournaments	Finals by surface Clay (4–9)

Result	W–L	Date	Tournament	Tier	Surface	Opponent	Score
Loss	0–1	Mar 2014	ITF Le Havre, France	10k	Clay (i)	(Spain) Yvonne Cavallé Reimers	6–2, 4–6, 3–6
Win	1–1	Aug 2017	ITF Cuneo, Italy	15k	Clay	(Italy) Federica di Sarra	6–7^{(2)}, 6–3, 6–3
Win	2–1	Sep 2017	ITF Bucha, Ukraine	15k	Clay	(Ukraine) Yuliya Lysa	6–3, 6–4
Win	3–1	Feb 2018	ITF Bergamo, Italy	15k	Clay (i)	(Germany) Lena Papadakis	6–2, 6–1
Win	4–1	Sep 2019	ITF Tabarka, Tunisia	W15	Clay	(Belgium) Chelsea Van Houtte	7–6^{(2)}, 6–4
Loss	4–2	Sep 2019	ITF Tabarka, Tunisia	W15	Clay	(Italy) Aurora Zantedeschi	3–6, 0–6
Loss	4–3	Feb 2020	ITF Heraklion, Greece	W15	Clay	(Italy) Martina Spigarelli	2–6, 2–6
Loss	4–4	Mar 2020	ITF Heraklion, Greece	W15	Clay	(Romania) Andreea Roșca	0–6, 1–6
Loss	4–5	Apr 2022	ITF Antalya, Turkey	W15	Clay	(Russia) Mirra Andreeva	7–6^{(7)}, 0–6, 2–6
Loss	4–6	Jan 2025	ITF Antalya, Turkey	W15	Clay	(Germany) Joëlle Steur	5–7, 1–6
Loss	4–7	Dec 2025	ITF Nairobi, Kenya	W35	Clay	(Kenya) Angella Okutoyi	3–6, 6–3, 3–6
Loss	4–8	Jan 2026	ITF Nairobi, Kenya	W35	Clay	(Kenya) Angella Okutoyi	3–6, 6–7^{(3)}
Loss	4–9	May 2026	ITF Klagenfurt, Austria	W15	Clay	(Slovenia) Pia Lovrič	6–4, 4–6, 4–6

=== Doubles: 36 (23 titles, 13 runner-ups) ===
Legend W50 tournaments W25/35 tournaments W10/15 tournaments	Finals by surface Hard (1–0) Clay (22–11) Carpet (0–2)

Result	W–L	Date	Tournament	Tier	Surface	Partner	Opponents	Score
Win	1–0	Nov 2013	ITF Castellón, Spain	10,000	Clay	(Germany) Anna Klasen	(Spain) Lucía Cervera Vázquez (China) Zhu Aiwen	6–1, 5–7, [10–5]
Win	2–0	Jun 2016	Internazionali di Brescia, Italy	50,000	Clay	(Italy) Deborah Chiesa	(Netherlands) Cindy Burger (Liechtenstein) Stephanie Vogt	6–3, 1–6, [12–10]
Loss	2–1	Feb 2017	ITF Bergamo, Italy	15,000	Clay (i)	(Switzerland) Ylena In-Albon	(Italy) Tatiana Pieri (Italy) Lucrezia Stefanini	6–3, 3–6, [6–10]
Win	3–1	May 2017	ITF Caserta, Italy	25,000	Clay	(Italy) Deborah Chiesa	(Latvia) Diāna Marcinkēviča (Italy) Camilla Rosatello	7–6^{(5)}, 6–4
Loss	3–2	Jul 2017	ITF Focșani, Romania	15,000	Clay	(Romania) Camelia Hristea	(Romania) Oana Gavrilă (Russia) Ekaterina Kazionova	2–6, 1–6
Win	4–2	Sep 2017	ITF Bagnatica, Italy	25,000	Clay	(Italy) Deborah Chiesa	(Austria) Julia Grabher (Norway) Melanie Stokke	6–3, 4–6, [10–6]
Win	5–2	Sep 2017	ITF Bucha, Ukraine	15,000	Clay	(Italy) Michele Alexandra Zmău	(Ukraine) Maryna Chernyshova (Ukraine) Kateryna Sliusar	6–4, 6–3
Loss	5–3	Sep 2017	ITF Kyiv, Ukraine	15,000	Clay	(Italy) Michele Alexandra Zmău	(Ukraine) Maryna Kolb (Ukraine) Nadiya Kolb	2–6, 6–4, [11–13]
Loss	5–4	Feb 2018	ITF Bergamo, Italy	15,000	Clay (i)	(Italy) Claudia Giovine	(Russia) Kseniia Becker (Kyrgyzstan) Ksenia Palkina	4–6, 6–4, [8–10]
Win	6–4	Feb 2018	ITF Sharm El Sheikh, Egypt	15,000	Hard	(Russia) Valeriya Solovyeva	(Chinese Taipei) Lee Pei-chi (India) Pranjala Yadlapalli	6–2, 6–3
Loss	6–5	Jun 2018	ITF Montpellier, France	25,000	Clay	(Brazil) Carolina Alves	(France) Elixane Lechemia (France) Alice Ramé	7–6^{(5)}, 2–6, [6–10]
Win	7–5	Jul 2018	ITF Darmstadt, Germany	25,000	Clay	(Greece) Despina Papamichail	(Germany) Romy Kölzer (Venezuela) Aymet Uzcátegui	6–4, 3–6, [10–6]
Win	8–5	Sep 2018	ITF Santa Margherita di Pula, Italy	25,000	Clay	(Italy) Federica di Sarra	(United Kingdom) Emily Arbuthnott (Germany) Katharina Hobgarski	7–6^{(0)}, 6–2
Win	9–5	Oct 2018	ITF Santa Margherita di Pula	W25	Clay	(Italy) Federica di Sarra	(Croatia) Lea Bošković (Romania) Cristina Dinu	6–4, 7–6^{(1)}
Win	10–5	Apr 2019	ITF Tunis, Tunisia	W25	Clay	(Italy) Anastasia Grymalska	(Romania) Jaqueline Cristian (Romania) Andreea Roșca	6–4, 6–2
Loss	10–6	May 2019	ITF Óbidos, Portugal	W25	Carpet	(Colombia) María Herazo González	(Georgia (country)) Sofia Shapatava (United Kingdom) Emily Webley-Smith	3–6, 0–6
Loss	10–7	May 2019	ITF Óbidos, Portugal	W25	Carpet	(Spain) Nuria Párrizas Díaz	(Georgia (country)) Sofia Shapatava (United Kingdom) Emily Webley-Smith	4–6, 1–6
Win	11–7	Jun 2019	ITF Minsk, Belarus	W25	Clay	(Norway) Ulrikke Eikeri	(Russia) Amina Anshba (Czech Republic) Anastasia Dețiuc	1–6, 6–4, [10–6]
Loss	11–8	Sep 2019	ITF Tabarka, Tunisia	W15	Clay	(Colombia) María Herazo González	(Germany) Natalia Siedliska (Bolivia) Noelia Zeballos	5–7, 1–6
Win	12–8	Sep 2019	ITF Tabarka, Tunisia	W15	Clay	(Colombia) María Herazo González	(Russia) Anna Pribylova (Bulgaria) Julia Stamatova	6–3, 6–1
Win	13–8	Oct 2019	ITF Tabarka, Tunisia	W15	Clay	(Italy) Aurora Zantedeschi	(Slovenia) Pia Lovrič (Italy) Sara Ziodato	2–6, 6–2, [11–9]
Loss	13–9	Jan 2020	ITF Antalya, Turkey	W15	Clay	(Croatia) Silvia Njirić	(Romania) Georgia Crăciun (Romania) Andreea Prisăcariu	5–7, 5–7
Win	14–9	Feb 2020	ITF Heraklion, Greece	W15	Clay	(Italy) Dalila Spiteri	(Romania) Ioana Gașpar (Germany) Romy Kölzer	4–6, 6–0, [10–6]
Win	15–9	Aug 2020	ITF Cordenons, Italy	W15	Clay	(Italy) Federica di Sarra	(Italy) Angelica Moratelli (Slovenia) Nika Radišić	6–2, 7–6^{(7)}
Loss	15–10	Nov 2020	ITF Heraklion, Greece	W15	Clay	(Italy) Melania Delai	(Romania) Andreea Roșca (Romania) Ioana Loredana Roșca	4–6, 4–6
Win	16–10	Aug 2021	ITF Cordenons, Italy	W15	Clay	(United States) Amy Zhu	(Bosnia and Herzegovina) Nefisa Berberović (Slovenia) Veronika Erjavec	6–4, 6–3
Loss	16–11	May 2022	ITF Santa Margherita di Pula, Italy	W25	Clay	(Italy) Lisa Pigato	(Portugal) Francisca Jorge (Portugal) Matilde Jorge	5–7, 6–0, [9–11]
Win	17–11	May 2022	ITF Antalya, Turkey	W15	Clay	(Bulgaria) Dia Evtimova	(Turkey) Doğa Türkmen (Turkey) Melis Ayda Uyar	6–2, 3–6, [10–8]
Loss	17–12	Aug 2022	ITF Agadir, Morocco	W25	Clay	(Sweden) Jacqueline Cabaj Awad	(Italy) Angelica Moratelli (Italy) Aurora Zantedeschi	2–6, 6–4, [7–10]
Win	18–12	Aug 2022	ITF Braunschweig, Germany	W25	Clay	(Germany) Anna Klasen	(Slovenia) Veronika Erjavec (Poland) Weronika Falkowska	6–3, 2–6, [10–5]
Win	19–12	Aug 2023	ITF Zaragoza, Spain	W25	Clay	(Argentina) Solana Sierra	(United States) Kimmi Hance (United States) Ashley Lahey	4–6, 6–4, [10–8]
Win	20–12	Oct 2023	ITF Santa Margherita di Pula, Italy	W25	Clay	(Italy) Lisa Pigato	(Slovenia) Nika Radišić (Bosnia and Herzegovina) Anita Wagner	6–4, 7–5
Win	21–12	Oct 2023	ITF Santa Margherita di Pula	W25	Clay	(Argentina) Guillermina Naya	(Germany) Katharina Hobgarski (Switzerland) Ylena In-Albon	6–2, 6–7^{(6)}, [10–8]
Win	22–12	Nov 2023	ITF Heraklion, Greece	W25	Clay	(Mexico) María Portillo Ramírez	(Latvia) Margarita Ignatjeva (Greece) Elena Korokozidi	6–2, 6–4
Win	23–12	Feb 2024	ITF Antalya, Turkiye	W35	Clay	(France) Alice Ramé	(Spain) Ángela Fita Boluda (Latvia) Daniela Vismane	3–6, 6–1, [13–11]
Loss	23–13	Jun 2026	ITF Mohammedia, Morocco	W35	Clay	(Italy) Federica Sacco	Elina Nepliy (India) Vasanti Shinde	6–3, 4–6, [4–10]
