= BMW Roma Cup =

Women's World Tennis Tour
- Event name: BMW Roma Cup (2023–); Trofeo BMW Cup (2022); Trofeo Reale Mutua (2013–19); SMA Cup Sant'Elia (2011–12); Roma Canottieri Tevere Remo (2004–10)
- Location: Rome, Italy
- Venue: Reale Circolo Canottieri Tevere Remo
- Category: ITF Women's World Tennis Tour
- Surface: Clay / outdoor
- Draw: 32S/32Q/16D
- Prize money: $25,000

The BMW Roma Cup is a tournament for professional female tennis players played on outdoor clay courts. The event is classified as a $25,000 ITF Women's World Tennis Tour tournament and has been held in Rome, Italy, since 2004. During 2022 and 2023 the event was upgraded to a $60,000 event.

== Past finals ==
=== Singles ===
Year	Champion	Runner-up	Score
2025	(Italy) Dalila Spiteri	(Italy) Giorgia Pedone	6–3, 7–5
2024	(Italy) Nuria Brancaccio	(United States) Varvara Lepchenko	7–6^{(8–6)}, 6–1
2023	(Croatia) Petra Marčinko	(Italy) Georgia Pedone	6–2, 6–2
2022	(Croatia) Tena Lukas	(Chile) Bárbara Gatica	6–1, 6–4
2020–21	Tournament cancelled due to the COVID-19 pandemic		
2019	(Chile) Daniela Seguel	(Brazil) Gabriela Cé	6–1, 7–5
2018	(Italy) Martina di Giuseppe	(Hungary) Fanny Stollár	7–5, 7–6^{(7–4)}
2017	(Austria) Julia Grabher	(Croatia) Tereza Mrdeža	7–5, 6–0
2016	(Slovakia) Rebecca Šramková	(Hungary) Réka Luca Jani	6–1, 6–1
2015	(Switzerland) Lisa Sabino	(Italy) Anna-Giulia Remondina	1–6, 6–3, 6–3
2014	(Italy) Ludmilla Samsonova	(Switzerland) Tess Sugnaux	6–2, 2–6, 6–4
2013	(Italy) Martina Caregaro	(Italy) Jasmine Paolini	6–2, 6–3
2012	(Spain) María Teresa Torró Flor	(Croatia) Tereza Mrdeža	6–3, 6–0
2011	(Italy) Karin Knapp	(France) Laura Thorpe	6–3, 6–0
2010	(Austria) Patricia Mayr	(Kazakhstan) Zarina Diyas	7–6^{(7–2)}, 6–4
2009	(Spain) Eloisa Compostizo de Andrés	(Spain) Estrella Cabeza Candela	6–3, 6–7^{(2–7)}, 6–2
2008	(Australia) Jessica Moore	(Austria) Patricia Mayr	6–3, 6–2
2007	(Bosnia and Herzegovina) Mervana Jugić-Salkić	(Chinese Taipei) Chan Chin-wei	6–3, 6–4
2006	(Hungary) Kira Nagy	(France) Alizé Cornet	6–2, 6–7^{(5–7)}, 6–4
2005	(Poland) Anna Korzeniak	(Italy) Annalisa Bona	6–4, 6–2
2004	(Czech Republic) Sandra Záhlavová	(Italy) Stefania Chieppa	5–7, 6–2, 6–3

=== Doubles ===
Year	Champions	Runners-up	Score
2025	(Italy) Noemi Basiletti (Italy) Giorgia Pedone	(Italy) Francesca Pace (Italy) Sofia Rocchetti	6–3, 6–1
2024	(Spain) Yvonne Cavallé Reimers (Italy) Aurora Zantedeschi	(Switzerland) Leonie Küng (United States) Rasheeda McAdoo	6–4, 6–4
2023	(Italy) Angelica Moratelli (Italy) Camilla Rosatello	(Romania) Oana Gavrilă (Greece) Sapfo Sakellaridi	3–6, 6–0, [10–7]
2022	(Italy) Matilde Paoletti (Italy) Lisa Pigato	Darya Astakhova (Latvia) Daniela Vismane	6–3, 7–6^{(9–7)}
2020–21	Tournament cancelled due to the COVID-19 pandemic		
2019	(Australia) Arina Rodionova (Australia) Storm Sanders	(Brazil) Gabriela Cé (Romania) Cristina Dinu	6–2, 6–3
2018	(Switzerland) Conny Perrin (South Africa) Chanel Simmonds	(Chinese Taipei) Chen Pei-hsuan (Chinese Taipei) Wu Fang-hsien	6–7^{(0–7)}, 6–1, [10–7]
2017	(Japan) Eri Hozumi (Japan) Miyu Kato	(Georgia (country)) Ekaterine Gorgodze (Norway) Melanie Stokke	6–1, 6–4
2016	(Italy) Claudia Giovine (Poland) Katarzyna Piter	(Venezuela) Andrea Gámiz (Hungary) Réka Luca Jani	6–3, 3–6, [10–7]
2015	(Italy) Martina di Giuseppe (Italy) Anna-Giulia Remondina	(Italy) Giulia Carbonaro (Italy) Federica Spazzacampagna	4–6, 6–2, [10–3]
2014	(Switzerland) Lisa Sabino (Italy) Alice Savoretti	(Germany) Luisa Marie Huber (Germany) Julia Wachaczyk	6–7^{(3–7)}, 7–5, [10–5]
2013	(Italy) Martina di Giuseppe (Romania) Bianca Hîncu	(Italy) Claudia Giovine (Italy) Jasmine Paolini	6–1, 6–3
2012	(Canada) Marie-Ève Pelletier (France) Laura Thorpe	(United States) Julia Cohen (Ukraine) Valentyna Ivakhnenko	6–0, 3–6, [10–8]
2011	(Paraguay) Verónica Cepede Royg (Argentina) Paula Ormaechea	(Russia) Marina Shamayko (Georgia (country)) Sofia Shapatava	7–5, 6–4
2010	(Australia) Sophie Ferguson (Australia) Trudi Musgrave	(Italy) Claudia Giovine (Italy) Valentina Sulpizio	6–0, 6–3
2009	(Argentina) María Irigoyen (Serbia) Teodora Mirčić	(Italy) Elisa Balsamo (Italy) Stefania Chieppa	7–5, 6–2
2008	(Latvia) Irina Kuzmina (Ukraine) Oxana Lyubtsova	(Ukraine) Irina Buryachok (Austria) Patricia Mayr	6–4, 4–6, [10–7]
2007	(Chinese Taipei) Chan Chin-wei (Ukraine) Tetiana Luzhanska	(Ukraine) Irina Buryachok (Austria) Patricia Mayr	7–6^{(7–4)}, 6–4
2006	(Croatia) Matea Mezak (Croatia) Nika Ožegović	(Croatia) Darija Jurak (Hungary) Kira Nagy	6–2, 6–3
2005	(Hungary) Katalin Marosi (Brazil) Marina Tavares	(Italy) Giulia Meruzzi (Italy) Nancy Rustignoli	walkover
2004	(Italy) Stefania Chieppa (Italy) Nicole Clerico	(Italy) Valentina Sulpizio (Czech Republic) Sandra Záhlavová	3–6, 6–4, 6–2
