= Matilde Paoletti =

Italian tennis player

- Country (sports): Italy
- Born: 4 March 2003 (age 23)
- Plays: Right-handed
- Prize money: $68,889

Singles
- Career record: 69–50
- Career titles: 2 ITF
- Highest ranking: No. 262 (17 July 2023)
- Current ranking: No. 889 (31 August 2026)

Doubles
- Career record: 19–13
- Career titles: 2 ITF
- Highest ranking: No. 387 (18 July 2022)
- Last updated on: 11 September 2026.

Matilde Paoletti (born 4 March 2003) is an Italian tennis player.

Paoletti has career-high WTA rankings of 262 in singles, achieved on 17 July 2023, and of 387 in doubles, achieved on 18 July 2022.

== Career ==
Paoletti made her WTA Tour main-draw debut at the 2021 Internazionali Femminili di Palermo in the doubles draw.

She made her WTA 1000 main-draw debut at the 2023 Italian Open, where she received a wildcard into the singles draw, losing to Océane Dodin in the first round.

Paoletti reached the quarterfinals again as a wildcard at the 2023 Firenze Ladies Open with wins over fifth seed Jule Niemeier and Nuria Brancaccio, before her run was ended by eventual finalist Taylor Townsend.

== ITF Circuit finals ==
=== Singles: 3 (2 titles, 1 runner-up) ===
Legend
W25/35 tournaments

Result	W–L	Date	Tournament	Tier	Surface	Opponent	Score
Win	1–0	Aug 2022	Verbier Open, Switzerland	W25	Clay	(Turkey) Zeynep Sönmez	6–2, 3–6, 7–6^{(2)}
Loss	1–1	Sep 2024	ITF Santa Margherita di Pula, Italy	W35	Clay	(France) Sara Cakarevic	2–6, 6–7^{(8)}
Win	2–1	Oct 2024	ITF Santa Margherita di Pula, Italy	W35	Clay	(Romania) Irina Bara	3–6, 6–2, 6–2

=== Doubles: 4 (2 titles, 2 runner-ups) ===
Legend
W60/75 tournaments
W25 tournaments
W15 tournaments

Result	W–L	Date	Tournament	Tier	Surface	Partner	Opponents	Score
Loss	0–1	Jul 2019	ITF Schio, Italy	W15	Clay	(Italy) Lisa Pigato	(Colombia) Yuliana Lizarazo (Italy) Aurora Zantedeschi	3–6, 6–1, [5–10]
Win	1–1	Dec 2020	ITF Selva Gardena, Italy	W25	Hard (i)	(Italy) Lisa Pigato	(Poland) Maja Chwalińska (Czech Republic) Linda Fruhvirtová	7–5, 6–1
Win	2–1	May 2022	Roma Cup, Italy	W60	Clay	(Italy) Lisa Pigato	(Russia) Darya Astakhova (Latvia) Daniela Vismane	6–3, 7–6^{(7)}
Loss	2–2	Jul 2024	ATV Roma, Italy	W75	Clay	(Italy) Beatrice Ricci	(Switzerland) Leonie Küng (India) Vasanti Shinde	6–4, 4–6, [7–10]
