= Leonie Küng =

Swiss tennis player

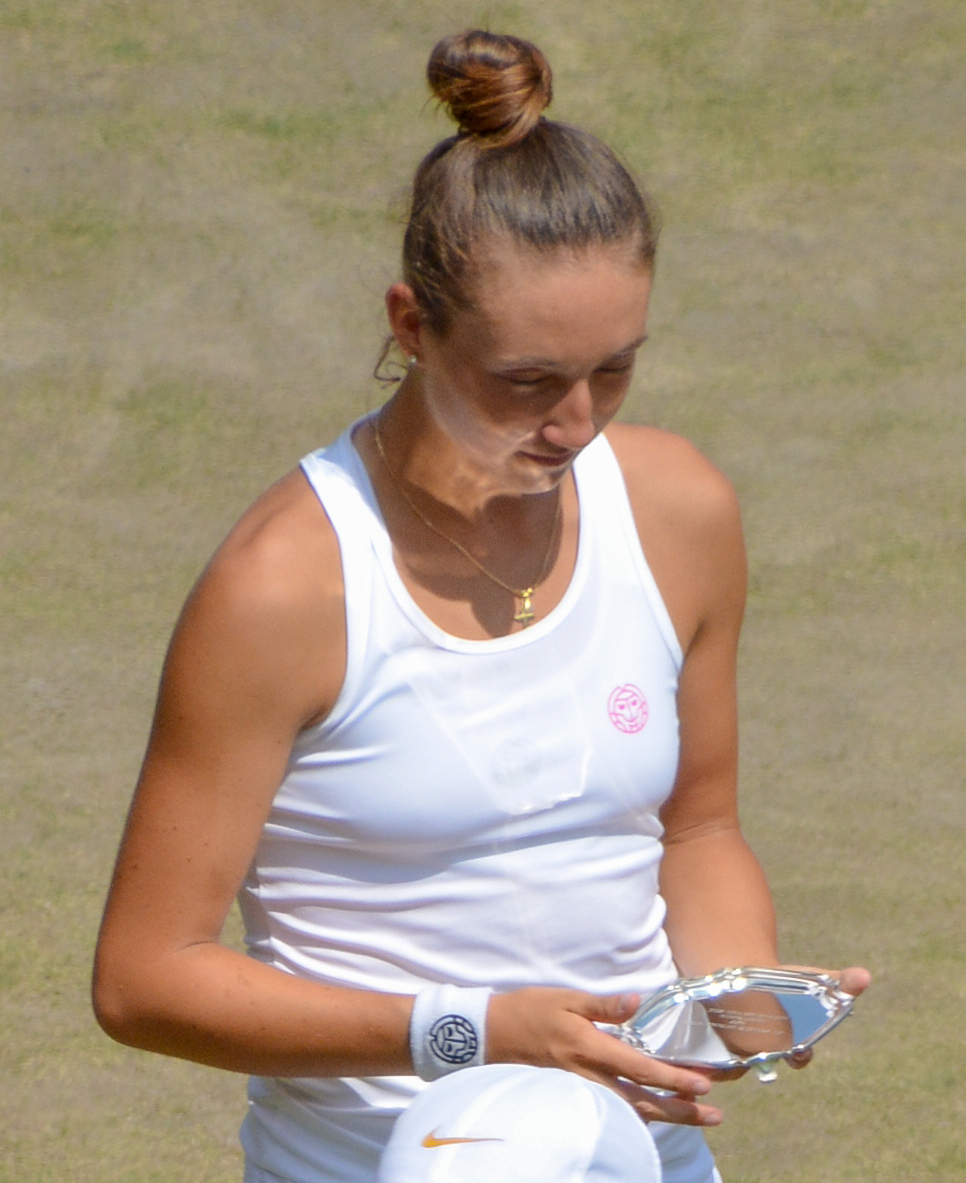
- Küng at the 2018 Wimbledon girls' singles
- Country (sports): Switzerland
- Residence: Beringen, Switzerland
- Born: 21 October 2000 (age 25) Beringen
- Height: 1.76 m (5 ft 9 in)
- Plays: Right (two-handed backhand)
- Prize money: $498,094

Singles
- Career record: 301–246
- Career titles: 11 ITF
- Highest ranking: No. 144 (14 September 2020)
- Current ranking: No. 895 (3 August 2026)

Grand Slam singles results
- Australian Open: Q1 (2021, 2022, 2025)
- French Open: Q2 (2020)
- Wimbledon: Q2 (2025)
- US Open: Q1 (2021)

Doubles
- Career record: 162–156
- Career titles: 1 WTA Challenger, 11 ITF
- Highest ranking: No. 220 (26 July 2021)
- Current ranking: No. 1,001 (3 August 2026)
- Last updated on: 14 August 2026.

Leonie Küng (born 21 October 2000) is a Swiss inactive tennis player. As a qualifier, she reached the singles final at the Junior Wimbledon Championships in 2018.

Küng has career-high WTA rankings of 144 in singles, achieved on 14 September 2020, and 220 in doubles, reached on 26 July 2021. To date, she has won one doubles WTA Challenger title with 11 singles and 11 doubles titles on the ITF Women's Circuit.

Küng played first ITF events in Greece in 2014, and won her first $15k events in singles and doubles at the age of 17, in November 2017 in Oslo. She was the 2021 Swiss national singles champion, and she also won the national doubles title, partnering Ylena In-Albon.

Küng made her WTA Tour main-draw debut at the 2017 Ladies Open Biel Bienne, in the doubles draw, partnering Ylena In-Albon. Küng reached her maiden WTA Tour singles final at the 2020 Thailand Open by defeating three top-100 players en-route to the final.

== Performance timelines ==
Key
W	F	SF	QF	#R	RR	Q#	DNQ	A	NH

(W) winner; (F) finalist; (SF) semifinalist; (QF) quarterfinalist; (#R) rounds 4, 3, 2, 1; (RR) round-robin stage; (Q#) qualification round; (DNQ) did not qualify; (A) absent; (NH) not held; (SR) strike rate (events won / competed); (W–L) win–loss record.
To avoid confusion and double counting, these charts are updated at the conclusion of a tournament or when the player's participation has ended.

Only main-draw results in WTA Tour, Grand Slam tournaments, Billie Jean King Cup and Olympic Games are included in win–loss records.

=== Singles ===
Tournament	2020	2021	2022	SR	W–L
Grand Slam tournaments
Australian Open	A	Q1	Q1	0 / 0	0–0
French Open	Q2	Q1	A	0 / 0	0–0
Wimbledon	NH	Q1	A	0 / 0	0–0
US Open	A	Q1	A	0 / 0	0–0
Win–loss	0–0	0–0	0–0	0 / 0	0–0
WTA 1000
Indian Wells Open	NH	Q1	A	0 / 0	0–0
Miami Open	NH	Q1	A	0 / 0	0–0
Win–loss	0–0	0–0	0–0	0 / 0	0–0

== WTA Tour finals ==
=== Singles: 1 (runner-up) ===
Legend WTA 250 (Note: The WTA International tournaments were reclassified as WTA 250 tournaments in 2021.) (0–1)	Finals by surface Hard (0–1)

Result	Date	Tournament	Tier	Surface	Opponent	Score
Loss	Feb 2020	Hua Hin Championships, Thailand	International	Hard	(Poland) Magda Linette	3–6, 2–6

== WTA 125 finals ==
=== Doubles: 1 (title) ===
Result	W–L	Date	Tournament	Surface	Partner	Opponents	Score
Win	1–0	Jul 2021	Bastad Open, Sweden	Clay	(Sweden) Mirjam Björklund	(Slovakia) Tereza Mihalíková (Russia) Kamilla Rakhimova	5–7, 6–3, [10–5]

== ITF Circuit finals ==
=== Singles: 20 (11 titles, 9 runner-ups) ===
Legend
W60/75 tournaments (0–1)
W40/50 tournaments (0–1)
W25/35 tournaments (4–4)
W10/15 tournaments (7–3)

Result	W–L	Date	Tournament	Tier	Surface	Opponent	Score
Loss	0–1	Oct 2016	ITF Telde, Spain	W10	Clay	(Italy) Giulia Gatto-Monticone	6–2, 1–6, 3–6
Win	1–1	Nov 2017	ITF Oslo, Norway	W15	Hard (i)	(Switzerland) Simona Waltert	6–4, 6–4
Win	2–1	Jan 2018	ITF Fort-de-France, Martinique	W15	Hard	(United Kingdom) Emily Appleton	6–4, 2–6, 6–4
Loss	2–2	Jan 2018	ITF Petit-Bourg, Guadeloupe	W15	Hard	(France) Irina Ramialison	3–6, 5–7
Win	3–2	Dec 2018	ITF Monastir, Tunisia	W15	Hard	(United States) Chiara Scholl	6–2, 6–1
Win	4–2	Dec 2018	ITF Monastir, Tunisia	W15	Hard	(Serbia) Bojana Marinković	6–2, 6–4
Loss	4–3	Aug 2019	ITF Las Palmas, Spain	W25+H	Clay	(Egypt) Mayar Sherif	1–6, 0–6
Win	5–3	Dec 2019	ITF Antalya, Turkey	W15	Hard	(Romania) Georgia Crăciun	6–2, 6–4
Win	6–3	Apr 2023	ITF Kursumlijska Banja, Serbia	W15	Clay	(Romania) Lavinia Tanasie	7–6^{(7)}, 6–1
Win	7–3	Apr 2023	ITF Kursumlijska Banja 2, Serbia	W15	Clay	(Romania) Lavinia Tanasie	6–3, 6–2
Loss	7–4	Jun 2023	ITF Santo Domingo, Dominican Republic	W25	Clay	(Argentina) Martina Capurro Taborda	2–6, 4–6
Loss	7–5	Jan 2024	ITF Naples, United States	W35	Clay	(Belgium) Marie Benoît	4–6, 6–1, 4–6
Win	8–5	Feb 2024	ITF Wesley Chapel, United States	W35	Clay	(United States) Sophie Chang	6–4, 3–6, 6–3
Win	9–5	Mar 2024	ITF Santa Margherita di Pula, Italy	W35	Clay	(Greece) Sapfo Sakellaridi	6–4, 6–4
Loss	9–6	Apr 2024	ITF Telde, Spain	W15	Clay	(Spain) Ariana Geerlings	1–6, 1–6
Loss	9–7	Jun 2024	ITF Palma del Río, Spain	W50	Hard	(Czech Republic) Linda Klimovičová	5–7, 4–6
Loss	9–8	Sep 2024	ITF Santa Margherita di Pula, Italy	W35	Clay	(Austria) Julia Grabher	6–3, 0–6, 2–6
Win	10–8	Oct 2024	ITF Loulé, Portugal	W35	Hard	(Spain) Irene Burillo	6–2, 6–1
Loss	10–9	Jan 2025	Brisbane QTC International, Australia	W75	Hard	(Australia) Priscilla Hon	4–6, 6–4, 2–6
Win	11–9	Feb 2025	ITF Timaru, New Zealand	W35	Hard	(United Kingdom) Naiktha Bains	6–1, 6–2

=== Doubles: 22 (11 titles, 11 runner-ups) ===
Legend
W60/75 tournaments (1–0)
W40/50 tournaments (0–1)
W25/35 tournaments (4–5)
W10/15 tournaments (6–5)

Result	W–L	Date	Tournament	Tier	Surface	Partner	Opponents	Score
Loss	0–1	Sep 2016	ITF Sion, Switzerland	W10	Clay	(Switzerland) Simona Waltert	(United Kingdom) Emily Arbuthnott (Switzerland) Karin Kennel	2–6, 1–6
Loss	0–2	Oct 2016	ITF Telde, Spain	W10	Clay	(Germany) Vivian Wolff	(Spain) Lucía de la Puerta Uribe (Spain) Guiomar Maristany	5–7, 4–6
Loss	0–3	Jul 2017	ITF Knokke, Belgium	W15	Clay	(Belgium) Axana Mareen	(United States) Quinn Gleason (Brazil) Luisa Stefani	4–6, 5–7
Win	1–3	Nov 2017	ITF Oslo, Norway	W15	Hard (i)	(Germany) Shaline-Doreen Pipa	(Germany) Ina Kaufinger (Sweden) Anette Munozova	6–4, 5–7, [10–3]
Win	2–3	Sep 2018	ITF Clermont-Ferrand, France	W25	Hard (i)	(Bulgaria) Isabella Shinikova	(France) Manon Arcangioli (France) Shérazad Reix	6–2, 7–5
Loss	2–4	Jun 2019	ITF Klosters, Switzerland	W25	Clay	(Bulgaria) Isabella Shinikova	(Switzerland) Lisa Sabino (Italy) Gaia Sanesi	6–3, 1–6, [6–10]
Loss	2–5	Dec 2019	ITF Antalya, Turkey	W15	Hard	(Turkey) Melis Sezer	(Romania) Georgia Crăciun (Romania) Ioana Gaspar	4–6, 6–1, [12–14]
Win	3–5	Nov 2022	ITF Solarino, Italy	W15	Carpet	(Netherlands) Lian Tran	(Italy) Giulia Crescenzi (Italy) Miriana Tona	6–2, 6–2
Win	4–5	Nov 2022	ITF Lousada, Portugal	W15	Hard (i)	(France) Océane Babel	(Spain) Celia Cerviño Ruiz (Switzerland) Tess Sugnaux	7–6^{(7–3)}, 5–7, [10–2]
Win	5–5	Feb 2023	ITF Monastir, Tunisia	W15	Hard	(Germany) Chantal Sauvant	(Belgium) Tilwith Di Girolami (Lithuania) Patricija Paukštytė	7–5, 6–2
Win	6–5	Feb 2023	ITF Monastir, Tunisia	W15	Hard	(Japan) Naho Sato	(Greece) Eleni Christofi (United States) Paris Corley	6–2, 6–1
Loss	6–6	Apr 2023	ITF Kursumlijska Banja, Serbia	W15	Clay	(Serbia) Bojana Marinković	(Slovakia) Katarína Kužmová; Ksenia Laskutova	5–7, 3–6
Win	7–6	May 2023	ITF Pörtschach, Austria	W15	Clay	(Germany) Chantal Sauvant	Valeriia Olianovskaia (Czech Republic) Linda Ševčíková	w/o
Win	8–6	Jul 2023	ITF Santo Domingo, Dominican Republic	W25	Clay	Ksenia Laskutova	(Spain) Noelia Bouzo Zanotti (Argentina) Martina Capurro Taborda	6–4, 3–6, [10–3]
Loss	8–7	Nov 2023	ITF Limassol, Cyprus	W25	Hard	(United Kingdom) Katy Dunne	Anastasiia Gureva; Polina Iatcenko	w/o
Win	9–7	Jan 2024	ITF Naples, United States	W35	Clay	(Belgium) Marie Benoît	(Japan) Mayuka Aikawa (Chinese Taipei) Hsu Chieh-yu	6–7^{(6)}, 6–2, [10–8]
Loss	9–8	Feb 2024	ITF Wesley Chapel, United States	W35	Clay	(Poland) Weronika Falkowska	Maria Kononova; Maria Kozyreva	5–7, 1–6
Loss	9–9	Mar 2024	ITF Alaminos, Cyprus	W35	Clay	(United Kingdom) Eliz Maloney	(Malta) Francesca Curmi (Greece) Despina Papamichail	3–6, 2–6
Loss	9–10	May 2024	ITF Montemor-o-Novo, Portugal	W50	Hard	Evialina Laskevich	(United Kingdom) Madeleine Brooks (Hong Kong) Eudice Chong	4–6, 4–6
Loss	9–11	Jul 2024	ITF Rome, Italy	W35	Clay	(United States) Rasheeda McAdoo	(Spain) Yvonne Cavallé Reimers (Italy) Aurora Zantedeschi	4–6, 4–6
Win	10–11	Jul 2024	ITF Rome Open, Italy	W75	Clay	(India) Vasanti Shinde	(Italy) Matilde Paoletti (Italy) Beatrice Ricci	4–6, 6–4, [10–7]
Win	11–11	Oct 2024	Open de Touraine, France	W35	Hard (i)	(United Kingdom) Sarah Beth Grey	(Ukraine) Anastasiia Firman (Switzerland) Chelsea Fontenel	6–4, 6–2

== Junior Grand Slam tournament finals ==
=== Girls' singles: 1 (runner–up) ===
Result	Year	Tournament	Surface	Opponent	Score
Loss	2018	Wimbledon	Grass	(Poland) Iga Świątek	4–6, 2–6
