= Deborah Chiesa =

Italian tennis player

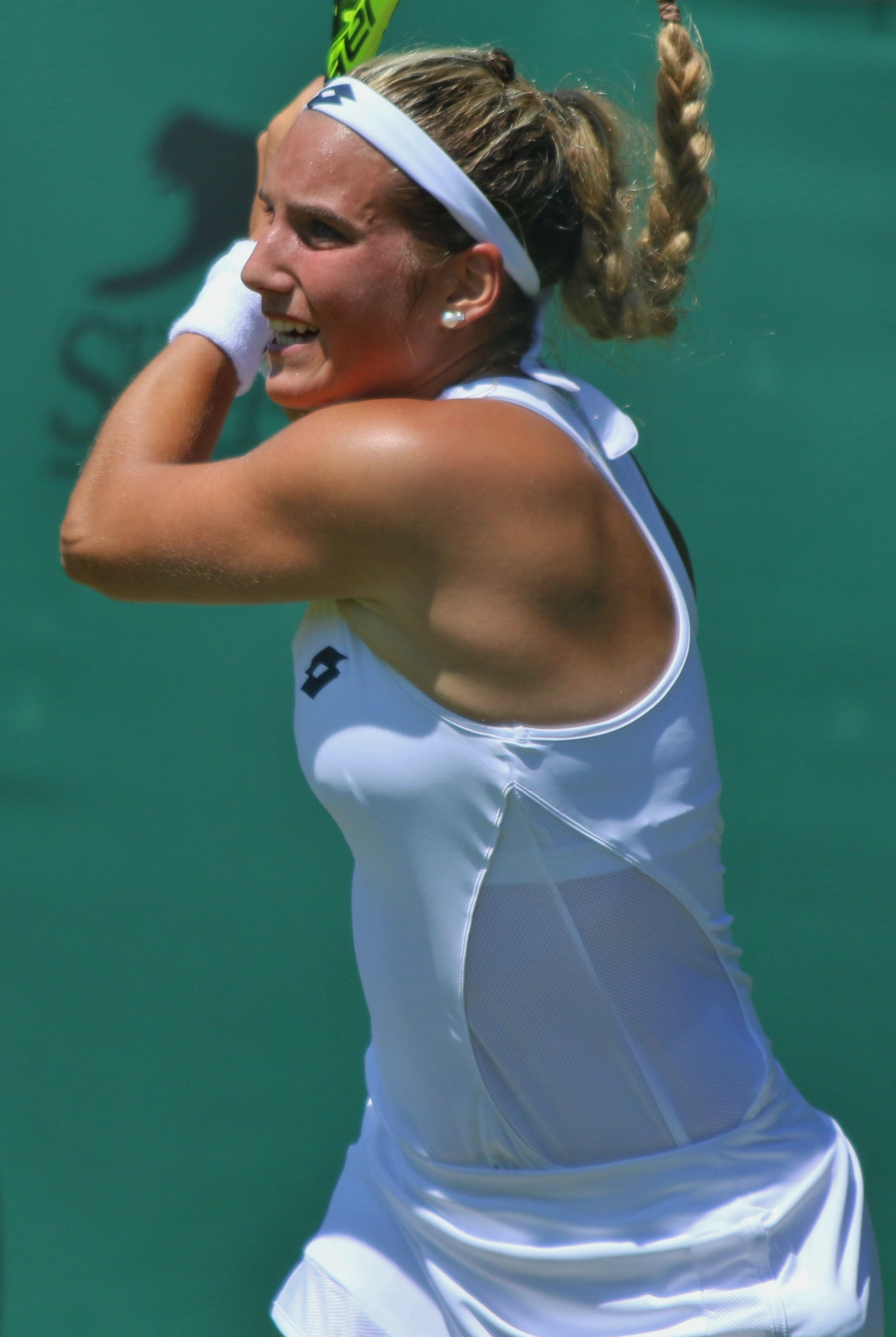
- Chiesa at the 2018 Wimbledon Championships
- Country (sports): Italy
- Residence: Trento, Italy
- Born: 13 June 1996 (age 30) Trento
- Height: 1.70 m (5 ft 7 in)
- Plays: Right-handed (two-handed backhand)
- Prize money: US$249,419

Singles
- Career record: 335–261
- Career titles: 4 ITF
- Highest ranking: No. 143 (11 June 2018)
- Current ranking: No. 667 (27 October 2025)

Grand Slam singles results
- Australian Open: Q1 (2018)
- French Open: 1R (2018)
- Wimbledon: Q2 (2018)
- US Open: Q1 (2018)

Doubles
- Career record: 136–105
- Career titles: 14 ITF
- Highest ranking: No. 307 (27 February 2017)
- Current ranking: No. 641 (27 October 2025)

Grand Slam doubles results
- Australian Open Junior: 1R (2013)
- French Open Junior: 2R (2013)
- Wimbledon Junior: 1R (2013)
- Last updated on: 27 October 2025.

Deborah Chiesa (born 13 June 1996) is a professional Italian tennis player.

On 11 June 2018, she achieved a career-high singles ranking of world No. 143. On 27 February 2017, she peaked at No. 307 in the WTA doubles rankings. Chiesa has won three titles in singles and fourteen in doubles on the ITF Women's Circuit.

Her biggest title to date she won at the $50k event in Brescia, partnering Martina Colmegna; in the final, they defeated Cindy Burger and Stephanie Vogt.

In 2018, she played two matches for Italy Fed Cup team, with a win-loss record of 1–1. In February 2018, Deborah Chiesa made her Fed Cup debut in the World Group II tie against Spain, held in Chieti. In the decisive fifth rubber, she defeated Lara Arruabarrena 6–4, 2–6, 7–6 after more than three hours of play. Her victory gave Italy a 3–2 win in the tie and ensured the team’s survival in World Group II.

In 2026, she lost a quarter finals to Lucia Bronzetti.

== Grand Slam performance timeline ==
Key
W	F	SF	QF	#R	RR	Q#	DNQ	A	NH

(W) winner; (F) finalist; (SF) semifinalist; (QF) quarterfinalist; (#R) rounds 4, 3, 2, 1; (RR) round-robin stage; (Q#) qualification round; (DNQ) did not qualify; (A) absent; (NH) not held; (SR) strike rate (events won / competed); (W–L) win–loss record.
To avoid confusion and double counting, these charts are updated at the conclusion of a tournament or when the player's participation has ended.

=== Singles ===
Tournament	2018	2019	W–L
Australian Open	Q1	A	0–0
French Open	1R	A	0–1
Wimbledon	Q2	A	0–0
US Open	Q1	A	0–0
Win–loss	0–1	0–0	0–1

== ITF Circuit finals ==
=== Singles: 16 (5 titles, 11 runner–ups) ===
Legend W60 tournaments (0–1) W25/35 tournaments (4–3) W10/15 tournaments (1–7)	Finals by surface Hard (0–1) Clay (3–8) Carpet (2–2)

Result	W–L	Date	Tournament	Tier	Surface	Opponent	Score
Loss	0–1	May 2016	ITF Warsaw, Poland	10,000	Clay	(United States) Sabrina Santamaria	1–6, 4–6
Loss	0–2	Sep 2016	ITF Trieste, Italy	10,000	Clay	(Italy) Claudia Giovine	5–7, 6–0, 2–6
Loss	0–3	Dec 2016	ITF Ortisei, Italy	10,000	Hard (i)	(Romania) Laura Ioana Andrei	2–6, 7–6^{(5)}, 4–6
Win	1–3	Jul 2017	ITF Torino, Italy	25,000	Clay	(Mexico) Renata Zarazúa	6–3, 2–6, 7–5
Loss	1–4	Aug 2017	Ladies Open Hechingen, Germany	60,000	Clay	(Germany) Tamara Korpatsch	6–2, 6–7^{(5)}, 2–6
Loss	1–5	Aug 2017	Montreux Ladies Open, Switzerland	25,000	Clay	(Spain) María Teresa Torró Flor	6–4, 1–6, 2–6
Win	2–5	Sep 2017	ITF Santa Margherita di Pula, Italy	25,000	Clay	(Italy) Jessica Pieri	7–6^{(3)}, 6–3
Win	3–5	Nov 2017	ITF Zawada, Poland	25,000	Carpet (i)	(Poland) Katarzyna Piter	6–2, 4–6, 6–4
Loss	3–6	Apr 2018	ITF Santa Margherita di Pula, Italy	25,000	Clay	(Luxembourg) Mandy Minella	3–6, 6–7^{(7)}
Loss	3–7	Apr 2022	ITF Antalya, Turkey	W15	Clay	(Greece) Sapfo Sakellaridi	4–6, 3–6
Loss	3–8	Aug 2024	ITF Køge, Denmark	W35	Clay	(Ukraine) Oleksandra Oliynykova	7–6^{(3)}, 0–6, 3–6
Loss	3–9	Sep 2025	ITF Viserba, Italy	W15	Clay	(Germany) Anne Schäfer	4–6, 6–3, 6–7^{(6)}
Loss	3–10	Oct 2025	ITF Solarino, Italy	W15	Carpet	(Italy) Federica di Sarra	2–6, 6–1, 1–6
Loss	3–11	Nov 2025	ITF Solarino, Italy	W15	Carpet	(Switzerland) Alina Granwehr	4–6, 2–6
Win	4–11	Nov 2025	ITF Solarino, Italy	W15	Carpet	(Switzerland) Fiona Ganz	6–4, 6–4
Loss	4–12	Apr 2026	ITF Santa Margherita di Pula, Italy	W35	Clay	(Italy) Giorgia Pedone	4–6, 1–6
Win	5–12	Jun 2026	ITF Tarvisio, Italy	W35	Clay	(Slovakia) Radka Zelníčková	6–0, 6–1

=== Doubles: 28 (16 titles, 12 runner-ups) ===
Legend W60/75 tournaments (2–0) W40/50 tournaments (0–2) W25/35 tournaments (6–3) W10/15 tournaments (8–7)	Finals by surface Hard (4–4) Clay (12–7) Carpet (0–1)

Result	W–L	Date	Tournament	Tier	Surface	Partner	Opponents	Score
Win	1–0	Jan 2014	ITF Tinajo, Spain	10,000	Clay	(Colombia) Yuliana Lizarazo	(Spain) Arabela Fernández Rabener (Belgium) Elise Mertens	6–2, 3–6, [13–11]
Win	2–0	Jun 2014	ITF Todi, İtaly	10,000	Clay	(Italy) Beatrice Lombardo	(Italy) Federica di Sarra (Italy) Alice Savoretti	6–3, 3–6, [10–8]
Win	3–0	Aug 2014	ITF Duino-Aurisina, Italy	10,000	Clay	(Dominican Republic) Francesca Segarelli	(Australia) Alexandra Nancarrow (Hungary) Naomi Totka	7–6^{(3)}, 6–2
Win	4–0	Feb 2015	ITF Port El Kantaoui, Tunisia	10,000	Hard	(Italy) Beatrice Lombardo	(India) Sharmada Balu (Japan) Michika Ozeki	6–3, 6–2
Win	5–0	Mar 2015	ITF Solarino, Italy	10,000	Hard	(Italy) Camilla Rosatello	(Italy) Marta Bellucco (Italy) Camilla Scala	7–6^{(4)}, 6–3
Loss	5–1	Sep 2015	ITF Madrid, Spain	10,000	Hard	(Australia) Isabelle Wallace	(Spain) Estrella Cabeza Candela (Spain) Cristina Sanchez-Quintanar	6–7^{(4)}, 5–7
Loss	5–2	Nov 2015	ITF Stockholm, Sweden	10,000	Hard (i)	(Estonia) Valeria Gorlats	(Poland) Olga Brózda (Ukraine) Anastasiya Shoshyna	3–6, 2–6
Win	6–2	Dec 2015	ITF Ortisei, Italy	10,000	Hard (i)	(Croatia) Adrijana Lekaj	(Switzerland) Chiara Grimm (Switzerland) Nina Stadler	6–1, 6–3
Loss	6–3	Mar 2016	ITF Heraklion, Greece	10,000	Hard	(Croatia) Adrijana Lekaj	(Russia) Aleksandra Pospelova (Russia) Alina Silich	6–3, 6–4
Win	7–3	May 2016	ITF Santa Margherita di Pula, Italy	10,000	Clay	(Spain) Olga Parres Azcoitia	(Italy) Federica Arcidiacono (Italy) Martina Spigarelli	6–4, 6–4
Loss	7–4	May 2016	ITF Warsaw, Poland	10,000	Clay	(Sweden) Jacqueline Cabaj Awad	(Finland) Emma Laine (United States) Sabrina Santamaria	6–7^{(6)}, 0–6
Win	8–4	Jun 2016	Internazionali di Brescia, Italy	50,000	Clay	(Italy) Martina Colmegna	(Netherlands) Cindy Burger (Liechtenstein) Stephanie Vogt	6–3, 1–6, [12–10]
Win	9–4	Jun 2016	ITF Sassuolo, Italy	10,000	Clay	(Italy) Alice Balducci	(Italy) Tatiana Pieri (Italy) Lucrezia Stefanini	6–4, 6–2
Loss	9–5	Jul 2016	ITF Schio, Italy	10,000	Clay	(Italy) Alice Balducci	(Chile) Bárbara Gatica (Colombia) María Fernanda Herazo	5–7, 6–1, [5–10]
Loss	9–6	Aug 2016	ITF Aprilia, Italy	10,000	Clay	(Denmark) Emilie Francati	(Italy) Giorgia Marchetti (Italy) Angelica Moratelli	1–6, 3–6
Loss	9–7	Nov 2016	ITF Solarino, Italy	10,000	Carpet	(Italy) Maria Masini	(France) Mathilde Armitano (France) Elixane Lechemia	5–7, 1–6
Win	10–7	May 2017	ITF Caserta, Italy	25,000	Clay	(Italy) Martina Colmegna	(Latvia) Diāna Marcinkēviča (Italy) Camilla Rosatello	7–6^{(5)}, 6–4
Win	11–7	Sep 2017	ITF Bagnatica, Italy	25,000	Clay	(Italy) Martina Colmegna	(Austria) Julia Grabher (Norway) Melanie Stokke	6–3, 4–6, [10–6]
Loss	11–8	Sep 2018	ITF Bagnatica, Italy	25,000	Clay	(Italy) Jasmine Paolini	(Italy) Giorgia Marchetti (Italy) Camilla Rosatello	4–6, 6–4, [8–10]
Loss	11–9	Sep 2018	ITF Santa Margherita di Pula, Italy	25,000	Clay	(Italy) Tatiana Pieri	(Italy) Federica di Sarra (Italy) Anastasia Grymalska	6–7^{(3)}, 2–6
Loss	11–10	Jan 2023	ITF Tallinn, Estonia	W40	Hard (i)	(Italy) Lisa Pigato	(Czech Republic) Lucie Havlíčková (Czech Republic) Dominika Šalková	5–7, 6–4, [11–13]
Win	12–10	Aug 2023	ITF Verbier, Switzerland	W25	Clay	(Italy) Dalila Spiteri	(Algeria) Inès Ibbou (Switzerland) Naïma Karamoko	1–6, 6–3, [10–7]
Win	13–10	May 2025	ITF Santa Margherita di Pula, Italy	W35	Clay	(Italy) Dalila Spiteri	(Spain) Ariana Geerlings (Italy) Sofia Rocchetti	Walkover
Win	14–10	Jun 2025	ITF Klosters, Switzerland	W35	Clay	(Italy) Lisa Pigato	(Netherlands) Jasmijn Gimbrère (United States) Ashley Lahey	6–0, 3–6, [10–6]
Win	15–10	Feb 2026	Porto Women's Indoor ITF, Portugal	W75	Hard (i)	(Switzerland) Naïma Karamoko	(Italy) Angelica Moratelli (Italy) Camilla Rosatello	6–2, 6–2
Loss	15–11	Apr 2026	ITF Santa Margherita di Pula, Italy	W35	Clay	(Malta) Francesca Curmi	(Czech Republic) Alena Kovačková (Czech Republic) Jana Kovačková	1–6, 3–6
Win	16–11	Apr 2026	ITF Santa Margherita di Pula, Italy	W35	Clay	(Italy) Giorgia Pedone	(France) Séléna Janicijevic (Serbia) Natalija Senić	7–6^{(8)}, 6–3
Loss	16–12	Nov 2026	ITF Heraklion, Greece	W50	Clay	(Italy) Giorgia Pedone	(Germany) Joëlle Steur (Netherlands) Sarah van Emst	0–6, 2–6
