= 2019 Torneo Internazionale Femminile Antico Tiro a Volo =

- Date: 10–16 June 2019
- Edition: 11th
- Category: ITF Women's World Tennis Tour
- Prize money: $60,000+H
- Surface: Clay
- Location: Rome, Italy

Champions

Singles
- (Italy) Sara Errani

Doubles
- (Italy) Elisabetta Cocciaretto / (Romania) Nicoleta Dascălu
| ← 2018 · | Torneo Internazionale Femminile Antico Tiro a Volo | · 2022 → |

The 2019 Torneo Internazionale Femminile Antico Tiro a Volo was a professional tennis tournament played on outdoor clay courts. It was the eleventh edition of the tournament which was part of the 2019 ITF Women's World Tennis Tour. It took place in Rome, Italy between 10 and 16 June 2019.

== Singles main-draw entrants ==
=== Seeds ===
| Country | Player | Rank^{1} | Seed |
|---|---|---|---|
| SUI | Stefanie Vögele | 97 | 1 |
| LUX | Mandy Minella | 100 | 2 |
| JPN | Nao Hibino | 121 | 3 |
| SRB | Olga Danilović | 125 | 4 |
| SUI | Conny Perrin | 140 | 5 |
| RUS | Varvara Flink | 144 | 6 |
| USA | Francesca Di Lorenzo | 154 | 7 |
| HUN | Anna Bondár | 179 | 8 |

- ^{1} Rankings are as of 27 May 2019.

=== Other entrants ===
The following players received wildcards into the singles main draw:

- (Italy) Elisabetta Cocciaretto
- (Italy) Cristiana Ferrando
- (Switzerland) Lisa Sabino
- (Italy) Lucrezia Stefanini

The following player received entry using a protected ranking:

- (United States) Anna Tatishvili

The following player received entry as a special exempt:

- (Germany) Stephanie Wagner

The following players received entry from the qualifying draw:

- (Romania) Nicoleta Dascălu
- (Romania) Cristina Dinu
- (Brazil) Paula Cristina Gonçalves
- (Italy) Tatiana Pieri
- (Belgium) Lara Salden
- (Italy) Dalila Spiteri

The following player received entry as a lucky loser:

- (Norway) Ulrikke Eikeri

== Champions ==
=== Singles ===
- (Italy) Sara Errani def. (Austria) Barbara Haas, 6–1, 6–4

=== Doubles ===
- (Italy) Elisabetta Cocciaretto / (Romania) Nicoleta Dascălu def. (Brazil) Carolina Alves / (Romania) Elena Bogdan, 7–5, 4–6, [10–7]
