= 2022 Torneo Internazionale Femminile Antico Tiro a Volo – Doubles =

Doubles
- 2022 Torneo Internazionale Femminile Antico Tiro a Volo

Final
- Champions: (Venezuela) Andrea Gámiz (Netherlands) Eva Vedder
- Runners-up: (France) Estelle Cascino (Italy) Camilla Rosatello
- Score: 7–5, 2–6, [13–11]

Events
Singles	Doubles
← 2019 ·	Torneo Internazionale Femminile Antico Tiro a Volo	· 2023 →

Elisabetta Cocciaretto and Nicoleta Dascălu were the defending champions but chose not to participate.

Andrea Gámiz and Eva Vedder won the title, defeating Estelle Cascino and Camilla Rosatello in the final, 7–5, 2–6, [13–11].

== Seeds ==
1. (France) Estelle Cascino / (Italy) Camilla Rosatello (final)
2. (Venezuela) Andrea Gámiz / (Netherlands) Eva Vedder (champions)
3. (Brazil) Rebeca Pereira / Anastasia Tikhonova (first round)
4. (Italy) Nuria Brancaccio / (Italy) Aurora Zantedeschi (quarterfinals)

== Draw ==
=== Key ===
- Q = Qualifier
- WC = Wild card
- LL = Lucky loser
- Alt = Alternate
- SE = Special exempt
- PR = Protected ranking
- ITF = ITF entry
- JE = Junior exempt
- w/o = Walkover
- r = Retired
- d = Defaulted
- SR = Special ranking

=== Draw ===
First round
1	(France) E Cascino (Italy) C Rosatello	6	6
(Italy) F Pace (Italy) F Urgesi	2	2
(Italy) A Grymalska (Ukraine) M Kostiuk	6	6
(Australia) O Gadecki (Norway) M Stokke	4	4
4	(Italy) N Brancaccio (Italy) A Zantedeschi	6	6^{4}	[11]
(Cyprus) R Șerban (Bulgaria) I Shinikova	3	7^{7}	[9]
(Romania) A Prisăcariu (Bosnia and Herzegovina) A Wagner	6	7
(Italy) A Raggi (Italy) S Rocchetti	0	5
(Croatia) M Dražić (Romania) IG Ghioroaie	2	6^{7}
(Andorra) V Jiménez Kasintseva; D Shnaider	6	7^{9}
(Netherlands) I Haverlag (Australia) Z Hives	6	7
3	(Brazil) R Pereira; A Tikhonova	4	5
(Italy) M Di Giuseppe (Italy) D Valente	4	6	[3]
(Argentina) P Ormaechea (Argentina) J Ortenzi	6	3	[10]
(Italy) M Delai (Italy) V Meliss
2	(Venezuela) A Gámiz (Netherlands) E Vedder	w/o

Quarterfinals
1	(France) E Cascino (Italy) C Rosatello	4	6	[10]
(Italy) A Grymalska (Ukraine) M Kostiuk	6	0	[2]
4	(Italy) N Brancaccio (Italy) A Zantedeschi	5	1
(Romania) A Prisăcariu (Bosnia and Herzegovina) A Wagner	7	6
(Andorra) V Jiménez Kasintseva; D Shnaider	6	6
(Netherlands) I Haverlag (Australia) Z Hives	2	3
(Argentina) P Ormaechea (Argentina) J Ortenzi	5	7^{7}	[8]
2	(Venezuela) A Gámiz (Netherlands) E Vedder	7	6^{4}	[10]

Semifinals
1	(France) E Cascino (Italy) C Rosatello	3	7^{7}	[10]
(Romania) A Prisăcariu (Bosnia and Herzegovina) A Wagner	6	6^{5}	[7]
(Andorra) V Jiménez Kasintseva; D Shnaider	3	4
2	(Venezuela) A Gámiz (Netherlands) E Vedder	6	6

Final
1	(France) E Cascino (Italy) C Rosatello	5	6	[11]
2	(Venezuela) A Gámiz (Netherlands) E Vedder	7	2	[13]
