= 2024 Women's TEC Cup =

Tennis tournament in Barcelona, Spain

- Date: 7–13 October 2024
- Edition: 2nd
- Category: ITF Women's World Tennis Tour
- Prize money: $100,000
- Surface: Hard / Outdoor
- Location: Cornellà de Llobregat, Spain

Champions

Singles
- (Serbia) Olga Danilović

Doubles
- (Spain) Yvonne Cavallé Reimers / (Netherlands) Eva Vedder
- Women's TEC Cup

The 2024 Women's TEC Cup was a professional tennis tournament played on outdoor hard courts. It was the second edition of the tournament, which was part of the 2024 ITF Women's World Tennis Tour. It took place in Cornellà de Llobregat, Barcelona, Spain, between 7 and 13 October 2024. This year the tournament's prize money was raised to $100,000 and it was moved from August to October.

== Champions ==
=== Singles ===
- (Serbia) Olga Danilović def. (Netherlands) Arantxa Rus, 6–2, 6–0

=== Doubles ===
- (Spain) Yvonne Cavallé Reimers / (Netherlands) Eva Vedder def. (Algeria) Inès Ibbou / (Switzerland) Naïma Karamoko, 7–5, 7–6^{(7–5)}

== Singles main draw entrants ==
=== Seeds ===
Country	Player	Rank	Seed
ESP	Nuria Párrizas Díaz	81	1
NED	Arantxa Rus	82	2
ARG	María Lourdes Carlé	86	3
SRB	Olga Danilović	97	4
GBR	Sonay Kartal	101	5
SVK	Anna Karolína Schmiedlová	109	6
~~ESP~~	~~Rebeka Masarova~~	~~119~~	~~7~~
UKR	Daria Snigur	124	8

- Rankings are as of 23 September 2024.

=== Other entrants ===
The following players received wildcards into the singles main draw:

- (Spain) Lucía Cortez Llorca
- (Spain) Ane Mintegi del Olmo
- (Spain) Kaitlin Quevedo
- (Spain) Neus Torner Sensano

The following players received entry from the qualifying draw:

- (Turkey) Çağla Büyükakçay
- Alina Charaeva
- (Bulgaria) Lia Karatancheva
- (Spain) Andrea Lázaro García
- (Croatia) Petra Marčinko
- (Mexico) María Portillo Ramírez
- (Serbia) Nina Stojanović
- (Romania) Lavinia Tănăsie

The following player received entry as a lucky loser:

- (Germany) Caroline Werner
