= 2019 Advantage Cars Prague Open =

Tennis tournament in the Czech Republic

- Date: 22–28 July 2019
- Edition: 26th (men); 15th (women)
- Category: ATP Challenger Tour; ITF Women's World Tennis Tour
- Prize money: €46,600 (men) $60,000 (women)
- Surface: Clay
- Location: Prague, Czech Republic
- Venue: I. Czech Lawn Tennis Club

Champions

Men's singles
- (Spain) Mario Vilella Martínez

Women's singles
- (Germany) Tamara Korpatsch

Men's doubles
- (Uruguay) Ariel Behar / (Ecuador) Gonzalo Escobar

Women's doubles
- (Romania) Nicoleta Dascălu / (Cyprus) Raluca Șerban
- Advantage Cars Prague Open

The 2019 Advantage Cars Prague Open, also known as Advantage Cars Prague Open by Moneta Money Bank for sponsorship reasons, was a professional tennis tournament played on outdoor clay courts. It was the 26nd (men) and 15th (women) editions of the tournament which was part of the 2019 ATP Challenger Tour and the 2019 ITF Women's World Tennis Tour. It took place in Prague, Czech Republic, between 22 and 28 July 2019.

== Men's singles main-draw entrants ==
=== Seeds ===
Country	Player	Rank^{1}	Seed
SVK	Andrej Martin	119	1
CZE	Lukáš Rosol	122	2
ITA	Lorenzo Giustino	130	3
ITA	Alessandro Giannessi	163	4
SRB	Nikola Milojević	182	5
KAZ	Aleksandr Nedovyesov	196	6
FRA	Constant Lestienne	198	7
GER	Mats Moraing	200	8
HUN	Attila Balázs	207	9
BRA	Rogério Dutra Silva	228	10
ESP	Bernabé Zapata Miralles	232	11
ITA	Luca Vanni	233	12
EGY	Mohamed Safwat	239	13
FRA	Tristan Lamasine	251	14
ESP	Daniel Gimeno Traver	258	15
BLR	Uladzimir Ignatik	263	16

- ^{1} Rankings are as of July 15, 2019.

=== Other entrants ===
The following players received wildcards into the singles main draw:

- (United States) Martin Damm
- (Czech Republic) Jonáš Forejtek
- (Slovakia) Lukáš Klein
- (Czech Republic) Jiří Lehečka
- (Czech Republic) Robin Staněk

The following player received entry into the singles main draw as an alternate:

- (Czech Republic) Michael Vrbenský

The following players received entry into the singles main draw using their ITF World Tennis Ranking:

- (Italy) Riccardo Bonadio
- (France) Corentin Denolly
- (Germany) Peter Heller
- (France) Tom Jomby
- (Egypt) Karim-Mohamed Maamoun

The following players received entry from the qualifying draw:

- (Czech Republic) Vít Kopřiva
- (Czech Republic) Pavel Nejedlý

== Women's singles main-draw entrants ==
=== Seeds ===
Country	Player	Rank^{1}	Seed
~~CZE~~	~~Barbora Krejčíková~~	~~132~~	~~1~~
CZE	Tereza Martincová	138	2
GER	Tamara Korpatsch	142	3
PAR	Verónica Cepede Royg	162	4
NED	Richèl Hogenkamp	164	5
~~GER~~	~~Katharina Hobgarski~~	~~208~~	~~6~~
ROU	Alexandra Cadanțu	214	7
CZE	Anastasia Zarycká	229	8

- ^{1} Rankings are as of 15 July 2019.

=== Other entrants ===
The following players received wildcards into the singles main draw:

- (Czech Republic) Denisa Hindová
- (Czech Republic) Monika Kilnarová
- (Czech Republic) Johana Marková
- (Czech Republic) Martina Přádová

The following player received entry as a special exempt:

- (Czech Republic) Jesika Malečková

The following players received entry from the qualifying draw:

- (France) Sara Cakarevic
- (Romania) Nicoleta Dascălu
- (Czech Republic) Barbora Miklová
- (Czech Republic) Magdaléna Pantůčková
- (France) Marine Partaud
- (Brazil) Teliana Pereira
- (Russia) Anastasia Pribylova
- (Italy) Lucrezia Stefanini

The following players received entry to the draw as Lucky Losers:

- (France) Manon Arcangioli
- (Czech Republic) Aneta Laboutková

== Champions ==
=== Men's singles ===
- (Spain) Mario Vilella Martínez def. (Chinese Taipei) Tseng Chun-hsin 6–4, 6–2.

=== Women's singles ===
- (Germany) Tamara Korpatsch def. (Czech Republic) Denisa Allertová, 7–5, 6–3

=== Men's doubles ===
- (Uruguay) Ariel Behar / (Ecuador) Gonzalo Escobar def. (Kazakhstan) Andrey Golubev / (Kazakhstan) Aleksandr Nedovyesov 6–7^{(4–7)}, 7–5, [10–8].

=== Women's doubles ===
- (Romania) Nicoleta Dascălu / (Cyprus) Raluca Șerban def. (Czech Republic) Lucie Hradecká / (Czech Republic) Johana Marková, 6–4, 6–4
