= 2019 Torneo Internazionale Femminile Antico Tiro a Volo – Doubles =

Doubles
- 2019 Torneo Internazionale Femminile Antico Tiro a Volo

Final
- Champions: (Italy) Elisabetta Cocciaretto (Romania) Nicoleta Dascălu
- Runners-up: (Brazil) Carolina Alves (Romania) Elena Bogdan
- Score: 7–5, 4–6, [10–7]

Events
Singles	Doubles
← 2018 ·	Torneo Internazionale Femminile Antico Tiro a Volo	· 2022 →

Laura Pigossi and Renata Zarazúa were the defending champions, but both players chose to participate in Barcelona instead.

Wildcards Elisabetta Cocciaretto and Nicoleta Dascălu won the title, defeating Carolina Alves and Elena Bogdan in the final, 7–5, 4–6, [10–7].

== Seeds ==
1. (Russia) Natela Dzalamidze / (Japan) Nao Hibino (first round)
2. (Norway) Ulrikke Eikeri / (France) Elixane Lechemia (semifinals)
3. (Italy) Anastasia Grymalska / (Italy) Giorgia Marchetti (first round)
4. (Indonesia) Beatrice Gumulya / (Indonesia) Jessy Rompies (first round)

== Draw ==
=== Key ===
- Q = Qualifier
- WC = Wild card
- LL = Lucky loser
- Alt = Alternate
- SE = Special exempt
- PR = Protected ranking
- ITF = ITF entry
- JE = Junior exempt
- w/o = Walkover
- r = Retired
- d = Defaulted
- SR = Special ranking

=== Draw ===
First round
1	(Russia) N Dzalamidze (Japan) N Hibino	1	7^{7}	[8]
(Greece) V Grammatikopoulou (Austria) B Haas	6	6^{4}	[10]
(United States) L Chirico (United States) F Di Lorenzo	7	6
(Bulgaria) I Shinikova (Netherlands) E Wacanno	5	1
3	(Italy) A Grymalska (Italy) G Marchetti	5	5
(Spain) N Párrizas Díaz (Switzerland) L Sabino	7	7
(Brazil) C Alves (Romania) E Bogdan	7	2	[11]
(Chinese Taipei) P-h Chen (Chinese Taipei) F-h Wu	5	6	[9]
WC	(Italy) E Cocciaretto (Romania) N Dascălu	6	6
WC	(Italy) C Giovine (Italy) A Matteucci	4	2
Alt	(Italy) M Caregaro (Brazil) PC Gonçalves	3	6	[10]
4	(Indonesia) B Gumulya (Indonesia) J Rompies	6	1	[8]
(Italy) F Di Sarra (Italy) C Rosatello	6^{4}	3
(Romania) C Dinu (Ukraine) G Poznikhirenko	7^{7}	6
WC	(Italy) J Pieri (Italy) L Stefanini	2	1
2	(Norway) U Eikeri (France) E Lechemia	6	6

Quarterfinals
(Greece) V Grammatikopoulou (Austria) B Haas
(United States) L Chirico (United States) F Di Lorenzo	w/o
(Spain) N Párrizas Díaz (Switzerland) L Sabino	3	2
(Brazil) C Alves (Romania) E Bogdan	6	6
WC	(Italy) E Cocciaretto (Romania) N Dascălu	6^{7}	6	[10]
Alt	(Italy) M Caregaro (Brazil) PC Gonçalves	7^{9}	0	[7]
(Romania) C Dinu (Ukraine) G Poznikhirenko	5	3
2	(Norway) U Eikeri (France) E Lechemia	7	6

Semifinals
(United States) L Chirico (United States) F Di Lorenzo	4	2
(Brazil) C Alves (Romania) E Bogdan	6	6
WC	(Italy) E Cocciaretto (Romania) N Dascălu	6	6
2	(Norway) U Eikeri (France) E Lechemia	2	1

Final
(Brazil) C Alves (Romania) E Bogdan	5	6	[7]
WC	(Italy) E Cocciaretto (Romania) N Dascălu	7	4	[10]
