= 2022 Torneo Internazionale Femminile Antico Tiro a Volo =

Tennis tournament

- Date: 11–17 July 2022
- Edition: 12th
- Category: ITF Women's World Tennis Tour
- Prize money: $60,000+H
- Surface: Clay / Outdoor
- Location: Rome, Italy

Champions

Singles
- (Croatia) Tara Würth

Doubles
- (Venezuela) Andrea Gámiz / (Netherlands) Eva Vedder
| ← 2019 · | Torneo Internazionale Femminile Antico Tiro a Volo | · 2023 → |

The 2022 Torneo Internazionale Femminile Antico Tiro a Volo was a professional tennis tournament played on outdoor clay courts. It was the twelfth edition of the tournament which was part of the 2022 ITF Women's World Tennis Tour. It took place in Rome, Italy between 11 and 17 July 2022.

== Champions ==
=== Singles ===
- (Croatia) Tara Würth def. (France) Chloé Paquet, 6–3, 6–4

=== Doubles ===
- (Venezuela) Andrea Gámiz / (Netherlands) Eva Vedder def. (France) Estelle Cascino / (Italy) Camilla Rosatello, 7–5, 2–6, [13–11]

== Singles main draw entrants ==
=== Seeds ===
| Country | Player | Rank^{1} | Seed |
|---|---|---|---|
| FRA | Chloé Paquet | 106 | 1 |
| ROU | Irina Bara | 122 | 2 |
| | Elina Avanesyan | 133 | 3 |
| FRA | Fiona Ferro | 148 | 4 |
| AND | Victoria Jiménez Kasintseva | 159 | 5 |
| ARG | Paula Ormaechea | 165 | 6 |
| | Anastasia Tikhonova | 167 | 7 |
| AUS | Olivia Gadecki | 178 | 8 |

- ^{1} Rankings are as of 27 June 2022.

=== Other entrants ===
The following players received wildcards into the singles main draw:

- (Italy) Diletta Cherubini
- (Italy) Verena Meliss
- (Italy) Matilde Paoletti
- (Italy) Bianca Turati

The following players received entry from the qualifying draw:

- (Italy) Nuria Brancaccio
- (France) Sara Cakarevic
- (Italy) Martina Di Giuseppe
- (Italy) Lisa Pigato
- (Romania) Andreea Prisăcariu
- (Italy) Stefania Rubini
- Diana Shnaider
- (Croatia) Tara Würth

The following player received entry as a lucky loser:

- (Italy) Angelica Raggi
