= 2023 Torneo Internazionale Femminile Antico Tiro a Volo =

Tennis tournament

- Date: 10–16 July 2023
- Edition: 13th
- Category: ITF Women's World Tennis Tour
- Prize money: $60,000
- Surface: Clay / Outdoor
- Location: Rome, Italy

Champions

Singles
- (Spain) Jéssica Bouzas Maneiro

Doubles
- Yuliya Hatouka / (Kazakhstan) Zhibek Kulambayeva
← 2022 ·	Torneo Internazionale Femminile Antico Tiro a Volo	· 2024 →

The 2023 Torneo Internazionale Femminile Antico Tiro a Volo was a professional tennis tournament played on outdoor clay courts. It was the thirteenth edition of the tournament which was part of the 2023 ITF Women's World Tennis Tour. It took place in Rome, Italy between 10 and 16 July 2023.

== Champions ==
=== Singles ===
- (Spain) Jéssica Bouzas Maneiro def. (Cyprus) Raluca Șerban, 6–2, 6–4

=== Doubles ===
- Yuliya Hatouka / (Kazakhstan) Zhibek Kulambayeva def. (Colombia) Yuliana Lizarazo / (Colombia) María Paulina Pérez, 6–4, 6–4

== Singles main draw entrants ==
=== Seeds ===
Country	Player	Rank^{1}	Seed
ESP	Jéssica Bouzas Maneiro	167	1
CYP	Raluca Șerban	173	2
ITA	Nuria Brancaccio	177	3
	Kristina Dmitruk	234	4
ESP	Irene Burillo Escorihuela	238	5
MKD	Lina Gjorcheska	247	6
TUR	Cagla Buyukakcay	254	7
	Yuliya Hatouka	256	8

- ^{1} Rankings are as of 26 June 2023.

=== Other entrants ===
The following players received wildcards into the singles main draw:

- (Italy) Diletta Cherubini
- (Italy) Laura Mair
- (Italy) Lisa Pigato
- (Italy) Dalila Spiteri

The following players received entry from the qualifying draw:

- (Italy) Anastasia Abbagnato
- (Italy) Deborah Chiesa
- (Italy) Federica Di Sarra
- (Slovakia) Anika Jašková
- (Slovenia) Pia Lovrič
- (United States) Anna Rogers
- (Italy) Jennifer Ruggeri
- (Bulgaria) Julia Terziyska
