= 2026 ATV Tennis Open – Singles =

Singles
- 2026 ATV Tennis Open

Final
- Champion: (United Kingdom) Francesca Jones
- Runner-up: (Italy) Lucia Bronzetti
- Score: 6–3, 6–1

Details
- Draw: 32 (4Q / 4WC)
- Seeds: 8

Events
Singles	Doubles
- ATV Tennis Open

Petra Marčinko was the reigning champion, but chose to compete in Iași instead.

Francesca Jones won the title after defeating Lucia Bronzetti 6–3, 6–1 in the final.

== Seeds ==
1. (Spain) Oksana Selekhmeteva (first round)
2. (Latvia) Darja Semeņistaja (first round)
3. (United Kingdom) Francesca Jones (champion)
4. (Italy) Lucia Bronzetti (final)
5. (Serbia) Lola Radivojević (second round)
6. (Germany) Noma Noha Akugue (quarterfinals)
7. (Italy) Nuria Brancaccio (semifinals)
8. (Italy) Tyra Caterina Grant (first round)

== Draw ==
Key

- Q = Qualifier
- WC = Wild card
- LL = Lucky loser
- Alt = Alternate
- ITF = ITF entry
- PR = Protected ranking
- SR = Special ranking
- SE = Special exempt
- JE = Junior exempt
- JR = Junior Accelerator Programme entrant
- CO = College Accelerator Programme entrant
- NG = Next Gen Accelerator Program entrant
- w/o = Walkover
- r = Retired
- d = Defaulted

=== Finals ===
Semifinals
WC	(Italy) Martina Trevisan	6	1	1
3	(United Kingdom) Francesca Jones	2	6	6
4	(Italy) Lucia Bronzetti	6	5	6
7	(Italy) Nuria Brancaccio	4	7	0

Final
3	(United Kingdom) Francesca Jones	6	6
4	(Italy) Lucia Bronzetti	3	1

=== Top half ===
First round
1	(Spain) O Selekhmeteva	3	2
(Bulgaria) E Yaneva	6	6
S Lansere	4	6	6
Q	(Estonia) E Malygina	6	1	4
(France) F Ferro	4	6	3
WC	(Italy) A Zantedeschi	6	2	6
WC	(Italy) M Trevisan	6	6
8	(Italy) TC Grant	0	3
3	(United Kingdom) F Jones	1	6	6
(Italy) D Spiteri	6	1	0
Q	(Ukraine) Y Kotliar	3	0
(Italy) F Urgesi	6	6
(Sweden) K Rinaldo Persson	3	1
D Astakhova	6	6
(France) A Ramé	1	5
6	(Germany) N Noha Akugue	6	7

Second round
(Bulgaria) E Yaneva	6	7^{7}
S Lansere	2	6^{4}
WC	(Italy) A Zantedeschi	1	6^{1}
WC	(Italy) M Trevisan	6	7^{7}
3	(United Kingdom) F Jones	2	6	6
(Italy) F Urgesi	6	4	1
D Astakhova	7	2	3
6	(Germany) N Noha Akugue	5	6	6

Quarterfinals
(Bulgaria) E Yaneva	6	2	2
WC	(Italy) M Trevisan	4	6	6
3	(United Kingdom) F Jones	6	6
6	(Germany) N Noha Akugue	3	1

Semifinals
WC	(Italy) M Trevisan	6	1	1
3	(United Kingdom) F Jones	2	6	6

=== Bottom half ===
First round
5	(Serbia) L Radivojević	6	6
(China) Y Ren	4	0
(North Macedonia) L Gjorcheska	7^{7}	3	3
WC	(Italy) D Chiesa	6^{1}	6	6
(Serbia) T Kostović	6	6
(Italy) J Ruggeri	2	3
Q	(Italy) A Mazzola	5	1
4	(Italy) L Bronzetti	7	6
7	(Italy) N Brancaccio	6	6
(Italy) J Pieri	2	2
WC	(Italy) F Pace	4	4
(Netherlands) E Vedder	6	6
PR	(Montenegro) D Kovinić	6	1	6
Q	(Italy) N Basiletti	2	6	4
(Argentina) J Riera	6	4	6
2	(Latvia) D Semeņistaja	1	6	1

Second round
5	(Serbia) L Radivojević	2	2
WC	(Italy) D Chiesa	6	6
(Serbia) T Kostović	4	4
4	(Italy) L Bronzetti	6	6
7	(Italy) N Brancaccio	6	6
(Netherlands) E Vedder	1	2
PR	(Montenegro) D Kovinić	6	5	5
(Argentina) J Riera	3	7	7

Quarterfinals
WC	(Italy) D Chiesa	6	3	2
4	(Italy) L Bronzetti	2	6	6
7	(Italy) N Brancaccio	6	1	7^{7}
(Argentina) J Riera	3	6	6^{5}

Semifinals
4	(Italy) L Bronzetti	6	5	6
7	(Italy) N Brancaccio	4	7	0

== Qualifying ==
=== Seeds ===
1. (Estonia) Elena Malygina (qualified)
2. (Italy) Noemi Basiletti (qualified)
3. (Italy) Alessandra Mazzola (qualified)
4. (France) Amandine Hesse (qualifying competition)

=== Qualifiers ===
1. (Estonia) Elena Malygina
2. (Italy) Noemi Basiletti
3. (Italy) Alessandra Mazzola
4. (Ukraine) Yelyzaveta Kotliar

=== Qualifying draw ===
==== First qualifier ====
Qualifying competition
1	(Estonia) Elena Malygina	7	4	7^{7}
WC	(Italy) Viola Turini	5	6	6^{2}

==== Second qualifier ====
Qualifying competition
2	(Italy) Noemi Basiletti	6	6
	(Italy) Anastasia Abbagnato	4	1

==== Third qualifier ====
Qualifying competition
3	(Italy) Alessandra Mazzola	6	6
WC	(Italy) Francesca Gandolfi	3	4

==== Fourth qualifier ====
Qualifying competition
4	(France) Amandine Hesse	3	7	3
	(Ukraine) Yelyzaveta Kotliar	6	5	6
