= 2011 Torneo Internazionale Femminile Antico Tiro a Volo =

- Date: May 30 – June 5
- Edition: 6th
- Location: Rome – Tiro A Volo, Italy

Champions

Singles
- (United States) Christina McHale

Doubles
- (Australia) Sophie Ferguson / (Australia) Sally Peers
- Torneo Internazionale Femminile Antico Tiro a Volo

The 2011 Torneo Internazionale Femminile Antico Tiro a Volo is a professional tennis tournament played on outdoor clay courts. It is part of the 2011 ITF Women's Circuit. It takes place in Rome – Tiro A Volo, Italy between 30 May and 5 June 2011.

== WTA entrants ==
=== Seeds ===
Country	Player	Rank^{1}	Seed
ITA	Maria Elena Camerin	119	1
JPN	Kurumi Nara	132	2
AUS	Sophie Ferguson	134	3
FRA	Iryna Brémond	139	4
ITA	Corinna Dentoni	146	5
LUX	Mandy Minella	147	6
RUS	Ekaterina Ivanova	150	7
RUS	Nina Bratchikova	151	8

- Rankings are as of May 23, 2011.

=== Other entrants ===
The following players received wildcards into the singles main draw:

- (Kazakhstan) Aselya Arginbayeva
- (Bulgaria) Martina Gledacheva
- (Italy) Giorgia Marchetti
- (Russia) Marina Shamayko

The following players received entry from the qualifying draw:

- (Australia) Isabella Holland
- (Italy) Karin Knapp
- (United States) Christina McHale
- (Australia) Jessica Moore

The following players received entry as a Lucky loser:

- (Italy) Stefania Chieppa
- (Italy) Carolina Orsi
- (Italy) Federica di Sarra
- (Spain) Sheila Solsona Carcasona

== Champions ==
=== Singles ===
(United States) Christina McHale def. (Russia) Ekaterina Ivanova, 6–2, 6–4

=== Doubles ===
(Australia) Sophie Ferguson / (Australia) Sally Peers def. (Poland) Magda Linette / (Romania) Liana Ungur, Walkover
