= 2019 Advantage Cars Prague Open – Women's singles =

Women's singles
- 2019 Advantage Cars Prague Open

Final
- Champion: (Germany) Tamara Korpatsch
- Runner-up: (Czech Republic) Denisa Allertová
- Score: 7–5, 6–3

Events
Singles	men	women
Doubles	men	women
- Advantage Cars Prague Open

The women's singles of the 2019 Advantage Cars Prague Open tournament was played on clay in Prague, Czech Republic.

Richèl Hogenkamp was the defending champion, but retired in the semifinals against Tamara Korpatsch.

Korpatsch won the title, defeating Denisa Allertová in the final, 7–5, 6–3.

== Seeds ==
1. (Czech Republic) Barbora Krejčíková (withdrew)
2. (Czech Republic) Tereza Martincová (quarterfinals)
3. (Germany) Tamara Korpatsch (champion)
4. (Paraguay) Verónica Cepede Royg (quarterfinals)
5. (Netherlands) Richèl Hogenkamp (semifinals, retired)
6. (Germany) Katharina Hobgarski (withdrew)
7. (Romania) Alexandra Cadanțu (second round)
8. (Czech Republic) Anastasia Zarycká (semifinals)

== Draw ==
Key

- Q = Qualifier
- WC = Wild card
- LL = Lucky loser
- Alt = Alternate
- ITF = ITF entry
- PR = Protected ranking
- SR = Special ranking
- SE = Special exempt
- JE = Junior exempt
- JR = Junior Accelerator Programme entrant
- CO = College Accelerator Programme entrant
- NG = Next Gen Accelerator Program entrant
- w/o = Walkover
- r = Retired
- d = Defaulted

=== Finals ===
Semifinals
5	(Netherlands) Richèl Hogenkamp	2	0^{r}
3	(Germany) Tamara Korpatsch	6	0
(Czech Republic) Denisa Allertová	6	6
8	(Czech Republic) Anastasia Zarycká	4	1

Final
3	(Germany) Tamara Korpatsch	7	6
(Czech Republic) Denisa Allertová	5	3

=== Top half ===
First round
LL	(France) M Arcangioli	2	2
(Bulgaria) V Tomova	6	6
WC	(Czech Republic) M Kilnarová	0	0
Q	(Czech Republic) B Miklová	6	6
Q	(Romania) N Dascălu	5	6	6
(Turkey) Ç Büyükakçay	7	4	4
Q	(Italy) L Stefanini	2	2
5	(Netherlands) R Hogenkamp	6	6
3	(Germany) T Korpatsch	6	4	6
Q	(Brazil) T Pereira	3	6	3
(Netherlands) Q Lemoine	1	6	7
Q	(Czech Republic) M Pantůčková	6	2	5
(Cyprus) R Șerban	6	6
WC	(Czech Republic) M Přádová	4	3
(Russia) S Lansere	6	5	6^{9}
7	(Romania) A Cadanțu	0	7	7^{11}

Second round
(Bulgaria) V Tomova	6	6
Q	(Czech Republic) B Miklová	4	4
Q	(Romania) N Dascălu	6	6^{5}	4
5	(Netherlands) R Hogenkamp	3	7^{7}	6
3	(Germany) T Korpatsch	6	7
(Netherlands) Q Lemoine	2	5
(Cyprus) R Șerban	7^{7}	7
7	(Romania) A Cadanțu	6^{3}	5

Quarterfinals
(Bulgaria) V Tomova	5	6	3
5	(Netherlands) R Hogenkamp	7	4	6
3	(Germany) T Korpatsch	6	6
(Cyprus) R Șerban	1	1

Semifinals
5	(Netherlands) R Hogenkamp	2	0^{r}
3	(Germany) T Korpatsch	6	0

=== Bottom half ===
First round
Q	(France) S Cakarevic	6	6
SE	(Czech Republic) J Malečková	2	2
(Belgium) K Zimmermann	3	6^{4}
(Czech Republic) D Allertová	6	7^{7}
LL	(Czech Republic) A Laboutková	6	1	1
(Germany) S Wagner	3	6	6
Q	(Russia) Ana Pribylova	1	1
4	(Paraguay) V Cepede Royg	6	6
8	(Czech Republic) A Zarycká	6	6
Q	(France) M Partaud	3	0
(Hungary) RL Jani	6	6
(Romania) LI Paar	3	4
WC	(Czech Republic) J Marková	6	6
WC	(Czech Republic) D Hindová	4	2
(Czech Republic) L Hradecká	2	4
2	(Czech Republic) T Martincová	6	6

Second round
Q	(France) S Cakarevic	5	3
(Czech Republic) D Allertová	7	6
(Germany) S Wagner	4	6	3
4	(Paraguay) V Cepede Royg	6	2	6
8	(Czech Republic) A Zarycká	7^{7}	6
(Hungary) RL Jani	6^{5}	1
WC	(Czech Republic) J Marková	6	5	0
2	(Czech Republic) T Martincová	4	7	6

Quarterfinals
(Czech Republic) D Allertová	7^{7}	6
4	(Paraguay) V Cepede Royg	6^{5}	4
8	(Czech Republic) A Zarycká	6	2	6
2	(Czech Republic) T Martincová	2	6	3

Semifinals
(Czech Republic) D Allertová	6	6
8	(Czech Republic) A Zarycká	4	1
