= 2019 Torneo Internazionale Femminile Antico Tiro a Volo – Singles =

Singles
- 2019 Torneo Internazionale Femminile Antico Tiro a Volo

Final
- Champion: (Italy) Sara Errani
- Runner-up: (Austria) Barbara Haas
- Score: 6–1, 6–4

Events
Singles	Doubles
← 2018 ·	Torneo Internazionale Femminile Antico Tiro a Volo	· 2022 →

Dayana Yastremska was the defending champion, but chose to participate in Nottingham instead.

Sara Errani won the title, defeating Barbara Haas in the final, 6–1, 6–4.

== Seeds ==
1. (Switzerland) Stefanie Vögele (first round)
2. (Luxembourg) Mandy Minella (second round)
3. (Japan) Nao Hibino (quarterfinals)
4. (Serbia) Olga Danilović (second round)
5. (Switzerland) Conny Perrin (semifinals)
6. (Russia) Varvara Flink (semifinals)
7. (United States) Francesca Di Lorenzo (quarterfinals)
8. (Hungary) Anna Bondár (first round)

== Draw ==
=== Key ===
- Q = Qualifier
- WC = Wild card
- LL = Lucky loser
- Alt = Alternate
- SE = Special exempt
- PR = Protected ranking
- ITF = ITF entry
- JE = Junior exempt
- w/o = Walkover
- r = Retired
- d = Defaulted
- SR = Special ranking

=== Finals ===
Semifinals
6	(Russia) Varvara Flink	2	3
(Italy) Sara Errani	6	6
5	(Switzerland) Conny Perrin	6	3	0
(Austria) Barbara Haas	2	6	6

Final
(Italy) Sara Errani	6	6
(Austria) Barbara Haas	1	4

=== Top half ===
First round
1	(Switzerland) S Vögele	4	2
(Italy) J Pieri	6	6
WC	(Italy) L Stefanini	4	6	3
Q	(Belgium) L Salden	6	2	6
Q	(Romania) N Dascălu	5	2
(Italy) M Di Giuseppe	7	6
(Romania) A Cadanțu	2	1
6	(Russia) V Flink	6	6
4	(Serbia) O Danilović	6	6
Q	(Italy) D Spiteri	1	1
(Italy) S Errani	6	6
WC	(Switzerland) L Sabino	2	4
Q	(Romania) C Dinu	3	4
SE	(Germany) S Wagner	6	6
Q	(Brazil) PC Gonçalves	2	1
7	(United States) F Di Lorenzo	6	6

Second round
(Italy) J Pieri	6	6
Q	(Belgium) L Salden	4	3
(Italy) M Di Giuseppe	6	3	2
6	(Russia) V Flink	4	6	6
4	(Serbia) O Danilović	6	2	2
(Italy) S Errani	3	6	6
SE	(Germany) S Wagner	4	2
7	(United States) F Di Lorenzo	6	6

Quarterfinals
(Italy) J Pieri	2	3
6	(Russia) V Flink	6	6
(Italy) S Errani	3	6	6
7	(United States) F Di Lorenzo	6	1	4

Semifinals
6	(Russia) V Flink	2	3
(Italy) S Errani	6	6

=== Bottom half ===
First round
5	(Switzerland) C Perrin	7^{7}	7
(United States) L Chirico	6^{3}	5
WC	(Italy) E Cocciaretto	4	4
(Greece) V Grammatikopoulou	6	6
(Bulgaria) I Shinikova	2	6	7
WC	(Italy) C Ferrando	6	4	5
Q	(Italy) T Pieri	6	2	3
3	(Japan) N Hibino	3	6	6
8	(Hungary) A Bondár	4	6	1
LL	(Norway) U Eikeri	6	3	6
PR	(United States) A Tatishvili	0	1
(Italy) A Grymalska	6	6
(Germany) A Zaja	4	4
(Austria) B Haas	6	6
(Spain) N Párrizas Díaz	0	1
2	(Luxembourg) M Minella	6	6

Second round
5	(Switzerland) C Perrin	6	6
(Greece) V Grammatikopoulou	2	2
(Bulgaria) I Shinikova	6	2	3
3	(Japan) N Hibino	4	6	6
LL	(Norway) U Eikeri	5	6	6
(Italy) A Grymalska	7	2	4
(Austria) B Haas	6	6
2	(Luxembourg) M Minella	4	1

Quarterfinals
5	(Switzerland) C Perrin	6	7^{9}
3	(Japan) N Hibino	4	6^{7}
LL	(Norway) U Eikeri	6	3	4
(Austria) B Haas	4	6	6

Semifinals
5	(Switzerland) C Perrin	6	3	0
(Austria) B Haas	2	6	6
