= 2024 Women's TEC Cup – Doubles =

Doubles
- 2024 Women's TEC Cup

Final
- Champions: (Spain) Yvonne Cavallé Reimers (Netherlands) Eva Vedder
- Runners-up: (Algeria) Inès Ibbou (Switzerland) Naïma Karamoko
- Score: 7–5, 7–6^{(7–5)}

Events
Singles	Doubles
← 2023 ·	Women's TEC Cup	· 2025 →

Prarthana Thombare and Anastasia Tikhonova were the defending champions, but chose not to participate.

Yvonne Cavallé Reimers and Eva Vedder won the title, defeating Inès Ibbou and Naïma Karamoko in the final; 7–5, 7–6^{(7–5)}.

== Seeds ==
1. (Portugal) Francisca Jorge / (United Kingdom) Maia Lumsden (first round)
2. (United Kingdom) Samantha Murray Sharan / (United Kingdom) Eden Silva (first round)
3. (Spain) Yvonne Cavallé Reimers / (Netherlands) Eva Vedder (champions)
4. (Bosnia and Herzegovina) Anita Wagner / (Belgium) Kimberley Zimmermann (first round)

== Draw ==
=== Key ===
- Q = Qualifier
- WC = Wild card
- LL = Lucky loser
- Alt = Alternate
- SE = Special exempt
- PR = Protected ranking
- ITF = ITF entry
- JE = Junior exempt
- w/o = Walkover
- r = Retired
- d = Defaulted
- SR = Special ranking

First round
1	(Portugal) F Jorge (United Kingdom) M Lumsden	1	5
(Algeria) I Ibbou (Switzerland) N Karamoko	6	7
(Ukraine) M Kolb (Ukraine) N Kolb	6	4	[1]
(United Kingdom) A Barnett (United Kingdom) M Brooks	2	6	[10]
4	(Bosnia and Herzegovina) A Wagner (Belgium) K Zimmermann	1	6	[9]
(Spain) A Lázaro García (Spain) G Maristany	6	4	[11]
Alt	A Charaeva; E Reyngold	6	6
WC	(France) L Petretic (Spain) R Roura Llaverias	1	0
WC	(Spain) L Cortez Llorca (Germany) M Hodzic	1	2
(United States) A Li (Netherlands) A Rus	6	6
(Greece) E Christofi (Bulgaria) L Karatancheva	2	5
3	(Spain) Y Cavallé Reimers (Netherlands) E Vedder	6	7
(Spain) C Ferrer Pérez (Spain) N Torner Sensano	6^{4}	2
P Kudermetova; M Timofeeva	7^{7}	6
(Serbia) N Stojanović (Switzerland) J Teichmann	1	6	[10]
2	(United Kingdom) S Murray Sharan (United Kingdom) E Silva	6	4	[6]

Quarterfinals
(Algeria) I Ibbou (Switzerland) N Karamoko	6	6
(United Kingdom) A Barnett (United Kingdom) M Brooks	4	1
(Spain) A Lázaro García (Spain) G Maristany	4	6	[10]
Alt	A Charaeva; E Reyngold	6	3	[12]
(United States) A Li (Netherlands) A Rus
3	(Spain) Y Cavallé Reimers (Netherlands) E Vedder	w/o
P Kudermetova; M Timofeeva	4	0
(Serbia) N Stojanović (Switzerland) J Teichmann	6	6

Semifinals
(Algeria) I Ibbou (Switzerland) N Karamoko	6	7^{7}
Alt	A Charaeva; E Reyngold	4	6^{4}
3	(Spain) Y Cavallé Reimers (Netherlands) E Vedder	0	6	[10]
(Serbia) N Stojanović (Switzerland) J Teichmann	6	1	[8]

Final
(Algeria) I Ibbou (Switzerland) N Karamoko	5	6^{5}
3	(Spain) Y Cavallé Reimers (Netherlands) E Vedder	7	7^{7}
