= 2018 Torneo Internazionale Femminile Antico Tiro a Volo – Singles =

Singles
- 2018 Torneo Internazionale Femminile Antico Tiro a Volo

Final
- Champion: (Ukraine) Dayana Yastremska
- Runner-up: (Russia) Anastasia Potapova
- Score: 6–1, 6–0

Events
Singles	Doubles
← 2017 ·	Torneo Internazionale Femminile Antico Tiro a Volo	· 2019 →

Kateryna Kozlova was the defending champion, but chose to participate at the 2018 Wimbledon Championships instead.

Dayana Yastremska won the title, defeating Anastasia Potapova in the final, 6–1, 6–0.

== Seeds ==
1. (Montenegro) Danka Kovinić (first round)
2. (Ukraine) Dayana Yastremska (champion)
3. (Slovakia) Jana Čepelová (first round)
4. (Russia) Sofya Zhuk (quarterfinals)
5. (Italy) Deborah Chiesa (first round)
6. (Italy) Martina Trevisan (first round)
7. (Liechtenstein) Kathinka von Deichmann (second round)
8. (Italy) Jasmine Paolini (first round)

== Draw ==
=== Key ===
- Q = Qualifier
- WC = Wild card
- LL = Lucky loser
- Alt = Alternate
- SE = Special exempt
- PR = Protected ranking
- ITF = ITF entry
- JE = Junior exempt
- w/o = Walkover
- r = Retired
- d = Defaulted
- SR = Special ranking

=== Finals ===
Semifinals
(Russia) Anastasia Potapova	7^{7}	7^{7}
(Switzerland) Jil Teichmann	6^{4}	6^{3}
(Spain) Sílvia Soler Espinosa	3	1
2	(Ukraine) Dayana Yastremska	6	6

Final
(Russia) Anastasia Potapova	1	0
2	(Ukraine) Dayana Yastremska	6	6

=== Top half ===
First round
1	(Montenegro) D Kovinić	6	2	3
Q	(Italy) L Stefanini	2	6	6
(Norway) U Eikeri	4	6^{3}
(Kazakhstan) E Rybakina	6	7^{7}
(Russia) A Potapova	6	7^{7}
Q	(Switzerland) L Sabino	3	6^{4}
WC	(Brazil) K Alexandre da Rosa	1	3
7	(Liechtenstein) K von Deichmann	6	6
4	(Russia) S Zhuk	6^{6}	6	6
(United States) K Stewart	7^{8}	1	1
(Mexico) R Zarazúa	6	2
(France) M Georges	2	0^{r}
WC	(Italy) C Rosatello	3	3
(Switzerland) J Teichmann	6	6
Q	(Russia) L Samsonova	7	6
6	(Italy) M Trevisan	5	0

Second round
Q	(Italy) L Stefanini	6	1	4
(Kazakhstan) E Rybakina	3	6	6
(Russia) A Potapova	6	5	6
7	(Liechtenstein) K von Deichmann	3	7	2
4	(Russia) S Zhuk	6	7
(Mexico) R Zarazúa	3	5
(Switzerland) J Teichmann	6	6
Q	(Russia) L Samsonova	2	2

Quarterfinals
(Kazakhstan) E Rybakina	5	2
(Russia) A Potapova	7	6
4	(Russia) S Zhuk	2	3
(Switzerland) J Teichmann	6	6

Semifinals
(Russia) A Potapova	7^{7}	7^{7}
(Switzerland) J Teichmann	6^{4}	6^{3}

=== Bottom half ===
First round
8	(Italy) J Paolini	4	6	1
WC	(Italy) S Rubini	6	3	6
(Slovakia) M Hončová	2	1
(Spain) S Soler Espinosa	6	6
(Italy) J Pieri	6	6
(Slovakia) C Škamlová	1	2
(Italy) A Grymalska	7^{7}	6
3	(Slovakia) J Čepelová	6^{5}	3
5	(Italy) D Chiesa	4	1
Q	(Czech Republic) A Zarycká	6	6
WC	(Italy) C Ferrando	4	3
(Italy) M Di Giuseppe	6	6
PR	(Hungary) RL Jani	4	6	6
(Romania) J Cristian	6	3	2
(Ukraine) K Zavatska	3	4
2	(Ukraine) D Yastremska	6	6

Second round
WC	(Italy) S Rubini	0	4
(Spain) S Soler Espinosa	6	6
(Italy) J Pieri	6	6
(Italy) A Grymalska	2	3
Q	(Czech Republic) A Zarycká	6	7^{7}
(Italy) M Di Giuseppe	1	6^{5}
PR	(Hungary) RL Jani	3	2
2	(Ukraine) D Yastremska	6	6

Quarterfinals
(Spain) S Soler Espinosa	7	5	7^{7}
(Italy) J Pieri	5	7	6^{4}
Q	(Czech Republic) A Zarycká	6^{6}	4
2	(Ukraine) D Yastremska	7^{8}	6

Semifinals
(Spain) S Soler Espinosa	3	1
2	(Ukraine) D Yastremska	6	6
