= 2023 Women's TEC Cup – Singles =

Singles
- 2023 Women's TEC Cup

Final
- Champion: (Australia) Arina Rodionova
- Runner-up: Valeria Savinykh
- Score: 6–4, 5–7, 6–1

Events
| Singles | Doubles |
| Women's TEC Cup | · 2024 → |

This was the first edition of the tournament.

Arina Rodionova won the title, defeating Valeria Savinykh in the final, 6–4, 5–7, 6–1.

== Seeds ==
1. (United Kingdom) Harriet Dart (first round, retired)
2. (Germany) Eva Lys (second round)
3. Valeria Savinykh (final)
4. (Netherlands) Arianne Hartono (first round)
5. (Australia) Arina Rodionova (champion)
6. (Greece) Despina Papamichail (quarterfinals)
7. (Belgium) Magali Kempen (first round)
8. Anastasia Tikhonova (first round)

== Draw ==
=== Key ===
- Q = Qualifier
- WC = Wild card
- LL = Lucky loser
- Alt = Alternate
- SE = Special exempt
- PR = Protected ranking
- ITF = ITF entry
- JE = Junior exempt
- w/o = Walkover
- r = Retired
- d = Defaulted
- SR = Special ranking

=== Finals ===
Semifinals
(Hong Kong) Eudice Chong | 3 | 3
3 | Valeria Savinykh | 6 | 6
5/SR | (Australia) Arina Rodionova | 4 | 6 | 6
WC | (Spain) Georgina García Pérez | 6 | 1 | 3

Final
3 | Valeria Savinykh | 4 | 7 | 1
5/SR | (Australia) Arina Rodionova | 6 | 5 | 6

=== Top half ===
First round
1 | (United Kingdom) H Dart | 7^{7} | 3 | 1^{r}
(Hong Kong) E Chong | 6^{3} | 6 | 3
(France) A Albié | 3 | 3
WC | (Spain) G Maristany | 6 | 6
E Reyngold | 3 | 2
(Malta) F Curmi | 6 | 6
(United Kingdom) A Brogan | 7 | 6
7 | (Belgium) M Kempen | 5 | 3
3 | V Savinykh | 7^{7} | 6
Q | (Denmark) O Helmi | 6^{3} | 3
Q | A Gureva | 6 | 7
Q | (South Africa) I Kruger | 3 | 5
(Switzerland) S Bandecchi | 3 | 4
Q | (United Kingdom) E Lindh | 6 | 6
Q | (France) N Berecoechea | 3 | 3
6 | (Greece) D Papamichail | 6 | 6

Second round
(Hong Kong) E Chong | 7^{9} | 6
WC | (Spain) G Maristany | 6^{7} | 3
(Malta) F Curmi | 5 | 5
(United Kingdom) A Brogan | 7 | 7
3 | V Savinykh | 6 | 2 | 6
Q | A Gureva | 1 | 6 | 4
Q | (United Kingdom) E Lindh | 3 | 6 | 4
6 | (Greece) D Papamichail | 6 | 3 | 6

Quarterfinals
(Hong Kong) E Chong | 6 | 6
(United Kingdom) A Brogan | 3 | 3
3 | V Savinykh | 3 | 7^{8} | 6
6 | (Greece) D Papamichail | 6 | 6^{6} | 1

Semifinals
(Hong Kong) E Chong | 3 | 3
3 | V Savinykh | 6 | 6

=== Bottom half ===
First round
5/SR | (Australia) Ar Rodionova | 1 | 6 | 6
Q | (China) X Gao | 6 | 0 | 4
SE | M Bondarenko | 6 | 6
WC | (Spain) M García Cid | 4 | 1
A Charaeva | 3 | 4
(Spain) E Guerrero Álvarez | 6 | 6
Q | (Bulgaria) I Shinikova | 6 | 6^{5} | 7^{7}
4 | (Netherlands) A Hartono | 0 | 7^{7} | 6^{5}
8 | A Tikhonova | 6^{4} | 2
WC | (Spain) G García Pérez | 7^{7} | 6
(Israel) L Glushko | 2 | 2
(Finland) A Kulikova | 6 | 6
Q | (Latvia) D Marcinkēviča | 0^{r}
(Philippines) A Eala | 3
WC | (Spain) Y Cavallé Reimers | 6 | 5 | 6^{5}
2 | (Germany) E Lys | 4 | 7 | 7^{7}

Second round
5/SR | (Australia) Ar Rodionova | 6 | 6^{3} | 6
SE | M Bondarenko | 4 | 7^{7} | 2
(Spain) E Guerrero Álvarez | 4 | 3
Q | (Bulgaria) I Shinikova | 6 | 6
WC | (Spain) G García Pérez | 3 | 6 | 6
(Finland) A Kulikova | 6 | 0 | 2
(Philippines) A Eala | 4 | 6 | 6
2 | (Germany) E Lys | 6 | 4 | 1

Quarterfinals
5/SR | (Australia) Ar Rodionova | 6 | 6
Q | (Bulgaria) I Shinikova | 2 | 2
WC | (Spain) G García Pérez | 6 | 6
(Philippines) A Eala | 4 | 3

Semifinals
5/SR | (Australia) Ar Rodionova | 4 | 6 | 6
WC | (Spain) G García Pérez | 6 | 1 | 3
