= 2023 Torneo Internazionale Femminile Antico Tiro a Volo – Singles =

Singles
- 2023 Torneo Internazionale Femminile Antico Tiro a Volo

Final
- Champion: (Spain) Jéssica Bouzas Maneiro
- Runner-up: (Cyprus) Raluca Șerban
- Score: 6–2, 6–4

Events
Singles	Doubles
← 2022 ·	Torneo Internazionale Femminile Antico Tiro a Volo	· 2024 →

Tara Würth was the defending champion, but did not participate this year.

Jéssica Bouzas Maneiro won the title, defeating Raluca Șerban in the final, 6–2, 6–4.

== Seeds ==
1. (Spain) Jéssica Bouzas Maneiro (champion)
2. (Cyprus) Raluca Șerban (final)
3. (Italy) Nuria Brancaccio (first round)
4. Kristina Dmitruk (first round)
5. (Spain) Irene Burillo Escorihuela (quarterfinals)
6. (North Macedonia) Lina Gjorcheska (semifinals)
7. (Turkey) Çağla Büyükakçay (first round)
8. Yuliya Hatouka (second round)

== Draw ==
=== Key ===
- Q = Qualifier
- WC = Wild card
- LL = Lucky loser
- Alt = Alternate
- SE = Special exempt
- PR = Protected ranking
- ITF = ITF entry
- JE = Junior exempt
- w/o = Walkover
- r = Retired
- d = Defaulted
- SR = Special ranking

=== Finals ===
Semifinals
1	(Spain) Jéssica Bouzas Maneiro	7	7
Q	(Italy) Jennifer Ruggeri	5	5
6	(North Macedonia) Lina Gjorcheska	7	4	4
2	(Cyprus) Raluca Șerban	5	6	6

Final
1	(Spain) Jéssica Bouzas Maneiro	6	6
2	(Cyprus) Raluca Șerban	2	4

=== Top half ===
First round
1	(Spain) J Bouzas Maneiro	6	6
(Brazil) G Cé	3	1
(Italy) A Moratelli	6	4	6
(France) S Cakarevic	4	6	4
Q	(Bulgaria) J Terziyska	2	6	2
WC	(Italy) D Cherubini	6	0	6
A Zolotareva	3	4
5	(Spain) I Burillo Escorihuela	6	6
3	(Italy) N Brancaccio	2	6	3
(Italy) M Paoletti	6	2	6
Q	(Italy) D Chiesa	6	6
Q	(Italy) A Abbagnato	1	2
(Italy) C Rosatello	4	4
Q	(Italy) J Ruggeri	6	6
E Yashina	3	6	3
8	Y Hatouka	6	1	6

Second round
1	(Spain) J Bouzas Maneiro	6	6
(Italy) A Moratelli	1	4
WC	(Italy) D Cherubini	6	6^{6}	2
5	(Spain) I Burillo Escorihuela	1	7^{8}	6
(Italy) M Paoletti	6	7
Q	(Italy) D Chiesa	4	5
Q	(Italy) J Ruggeri	6	3	6
8	Y Hatouka	2	6	4

Quarterfinals
1	(Spain) J Bouzas Maneiro	6	6
5	(Spain) I Burillo Escorihuela	3	2
(Italy) M Paoletti	1	2
Q	(Italy) J Ruggeri	6	6

Semifinals
1	(Spain) J Bouzas Maneiro	7	7
Q	(Italy) J Ruggeri	5	5

=== Bottom half ===
First round
6	(North Macedonia) L Gjorcheska	6	7^{7}
WC	(Italy) L Mair	3	6^{5}
(Kazakhstan) Z Kulambayeva	2	6	6
Q	(Slovakia) A Jašková	6	3	2
WC	(Italy) D Spiteri	6	6
(France) M Partaud	4	1
(Australia) S Mendez	3	7	6
4	K Dmitruk	6	5	2
7	(Turkey) Ç Büyükakçay	4	0
(Italy) G Pedone	6	6
Q	(United States) A Rogers	4	6^{3}
(Australia) D Aiava	6	7^{7}
WC	(Italy) L Pigato	0	6	6
Q	(Slovenia) P Lovrič	6	4	3
Q	(Italy) F Di Sarra	2	4
2	(Cyprus) R Șerban	6	6

Second round
6	(North Macedonia) L Gjorcheska	4	6	6
(Kazakhstan) Z Kulambayeva	6	2	3
WC	(Italy) D Spiteri	2	1^{r}
(Australia) S Mendez	6	0
(Italy) G Pedone	2	6^{4}
(Australia) D Aiava	6	7^{7}
WC	(Italy) L Pigato	2	5
2	(Cyprus) R Șerban	6	7

Quarterfinals
6	(North Macedonia) L Gjorcheska	3	6	6
(Australia) S Mendez	6	2	4
(Australia) D Aiava	0^{r}
2	(Cyprus) R Șerban	4

Semifinals
6	(North Macedonia) L Gjorcheska	7	4	4
2	(Cyprus) R Șerban	5	6	6
