= 2019 Advantage Cars Prague Open – Women's doubles =

Women's doubles
- 2019 Advantage Cars Prague Open

Final
- Champions: (Romania) Nicoleta Dascălu (Cyprus) Raluca Șerban
- Runners-up: (Czech Republic) Lucie Hradecká (Czech Republic) Johana Marková
- Score: 6–4, 6–4

Events
Singles	men	women
Doubles	men	women
- Advantage Cars Prague Open

The women's doubles of the 2019 Advantage Cars Prague Open tournament was played on clay in Prague, Czech Republic.

Cornelia Lister and Nina Stojanović were the defending champions, but both players chose not to participate.

Nicoleta Dascălu and Raluca Șerban won the title, defeating Lucie Hradecká and Johana Marková in the final, 6–4, 6–4.

== Seeds ==
1. (Hungary) Réka Luca Jani / (Netherlands) Quirine Lemoine (quarterfinals)
2. (Romania) Laura Ioana Paar / (Czech Republic) Anastasia Zarycká (semifinals)
3. (Romania) Nicoleta Dascălu / (Cyprus) Raluca Șerban (champions)
4. (France) Manon Arcangioli / (Belgium) Kimberley Zimmermann (first round)

== Draw ==
Key

- Q = Qualifier
- WC = Wild card
- LL = Lucky loser
- Alt = Alternate
- ITF = ITF entry
- PR = Protected ranking
- SR = Special ranking
- SE = Special exempt
- JE = Junior exempt
- JR = Junior Accelerator Programme entrant
- CO = College Accelerator Programme entrant
- NG = Next Gen Accelerator Program entrant
- w/o = Walkover
- r = Retired
- d = Defaulted

=== Draw ===
First round
(Germany) T Morderger (Germany) Y Morderger	6	6
(Czech Republic) Z Bohatová (Serbia) N Lužajić	0	0
4	(France) M Arcangioli (Belgium) K Zimmermann	7	2	[7]
(Czech Republic) L Hradecká (Czech Republic) J Marková	5	6	[10]
(Czech Republic) M Kilnarová (Switzerland) K Milenkovic	5	2
(Czech Republic) A Laboutková (Finland) O Orpana	7	6
(Czech Republic) D Allertová (Slovakia) C Škamlová	6^{5}	6	[11]
(Russia) Ana Pribylova (Italy) L Stefanini	7^{7}	4	[9]
(Czech Republic) D Hindová (Czech Republic) V Vlkovská	1	3
3	(Romania) N Dascălu (Cyprus) R Șerban	6	6
(Czech Republic) S Břicháčková (Czech Republic) AM Kopecká	6^{2}	4
(Czech Republic) L Pulchartová (Bulgaria) A Vangelova	7^{7}	6
(Czech Republic) E Hrdinová (Russia) K Laskutova	2	2
2	(Romania) LI Paar (Czech Republic) A Zarycká	6	6

Quarterfinals
1	(Hungary) RL Jani (Netherlands) Q Lemoine	6^{3}	6^{3}
(Germany) T Morderger (Germany) Y Morderger	7^{7}	7^{7}
(Czech Republic) L Hradecká (Czech Republic) J Marková	6	6
(Czech Republic) A Laboutková (Finland) O Orpana	3	4
(Czech Republic) D Allertová (Slovakia) C Škamlová	7	2	[7]
3	(Romania) N Dascălu (Cyprus) R Șerban	5	6	[10]
(Czech Republic) L Pulchartová (Bulgaria) A Vangelova	3	5
2	(Romania) LI Paar (Czech Republic) A Zarycká	6	7

Semifinals
(Germany) T Morderger (Germany) Y Morderger	2	4
(Czech Republic) L Hradecká (Czech Republic) J Marková	6	6
3	(Romania) N Dascălu (Cyprus) R Șerban	6	4	[10]
2	(Romania) LI Paar (Czech Republic) A Zarycká	2	6	[3]

Final
(Czech Republic) L Hradecká (Czech Republic) J Marková	4	4
3	(Romania) N Dascălu (Cyprus) R Șerban	6	6
