= 2023 Torneo Internazionale Femminile Antico Tiro a Volo – Doubles =

Doubles
- 2023 Torneo Internazionale Femminile Antico Tiro a Volo

Final
- Champions: Yuliya Hatouka (Kazakhstan) Zhibek Kulambayeva
- Runners-up: (Colombia) Yuliana Lizarazo (Colombia) María Paulina Pérez
- Score: 6–4, 6–4

Events
| Singles | Doubles |
- Torneo Internazionale Femminile Antico Tiro a Volo

Andrea Gámiz and Eva Vedder were the defending champions but chose not to participate.

Yuliya Hatouka and Zhibek Kulambayeva won the title, defeating Yuliana Lizarazo and María Paulina Pérez in the final, 6–4, 6–4.

== Seeds ==
1. (Colombia) Yuliana Lizarazo / (Colombia) María Paulina Pérez (final)
2. (Italy) Angelica Moratelli / (Italy) Camilla Rosatello (second round)
3. (India) Prarthana Thombare / Ekaterina Yashina (semifinals)
4. (United States) Anna Rogers / (United States) Sofia Sewing (first round)

== Draw ==
Key

- Q = Qualifier
- WC = Wild card
- LL = Lucky loser
- Alt = Alternate
- ITF = ITF entry
- PR = Protected ranking
- SR = Special ranking
- SE = Special exempt
- JE = Junior exempt
- JR = Junior Accelerator Programme entrant
- CO = College Accelerator Programme entrant
- NG = Next Gen Accelerator Program entrant
- w/o = Walkover
- r = Retired
- d = Defaulted

=== Draw ===
First round
(Australia) D Aiava (Australia) S Mendez | 6 | 6
(Italy) A Zantedeschi (Italy) A Zucchini | 1 | 0
(Australia) A Osborne (Bulgaria) J Terziyska | 4 | 3
(India) V Shinde; A Zolotareva | 6 | 6
(Italy) D Chiesa (Italy) G Pedone | 6 | 4 | [10]
(Italy) A Abbagnato (Italy) L Mair | 3 | 6 | [4]
Y Hatouka (Kazakhstan) Z Kulambayeva | 6 | 6
3 | (United States) A Rogers (United States) S Sewing | 3 | 1
(Italy) E Alvisi (Italy) D Cherubini | 6^{3} | 2
(Bulgaria) D Evtimova (France) M Partaud | 7^{7} | 6

Quarterfinals
1 | (Colombia) Y Lizarazo (Colombia) MP Pérez | 6 | 6
(Australia) D Aiava (Australia) S Mendez | 2 | 3
3 | (India) P Thombare; E Yashina | 6 | 6
(India) V Shinde; A Zolotareva | 1 | 4
(Italy) D Chiesa (Italy) G Pedone | 3 | 1
Y Hatouka (Kazakhstan) Z Kulambayeva | 6 | 6
(Bulgaria) D Evtimova (France) M Partaud | w/o
2 | (Italy) A Moratelli (Italy) C Rosatello

Semifinals
1 | (Colombia) Y Lizarazo (Colombia) MP Pérez | 6 | 3 | [10]
3 | (India) P Thombare; E Yashina | 4 | 6 | [4]
Y Hatouka (Kazakhstan) Z Kulambayeva | 6 | 6
(Bulgaria) D Evtimova (France) M Partaud | 4 | 2

Final
1 | (Colombia) Y Lizarazo (Colombia) MP Pérez | 4 | 4
Y Hatouka (Kazakhstan) Z Kulambayeva | 6 | 6
