= 2018 Torneo Internazionale Femminile Antico Tiro a Volo =

- Date: 2–8 July
- Edition: 10th
- Category: ITF Women's Circuit
- Prize money: $60,000+H
- Surface: Clay
- Location: Rome, Italy

Champions

Singles
- (Ukraine) Dayana Yastremska

Doubles
- (Brazil) Laura Pigossi / (Mexico) Renata Zarazúa
- Torneo Internazionale Femminile Antico Tiro a Volo

The 2018 Torneo Internazionale Femminile Antico Tiro a Volo was a professional tennis tournament played on outdoor clay courts. It was the tenth edition of the tournament and was part of the 2018 ITF Women's Circuit. It took place in Rome, Italy, on 2–8 July 2018.

== Singles main draw entrants ==
=== Seeds ===
Country	Player	Rank^{1}	Seed
MNE	Danka Kovinić	120	1
UKR	Dayana Yastremska	127	2
SVK	Jana Čepelová	137	3
RUS	Sofya Zhuk	139	4
ITA	Deborah Chiesa	148	5
ITA	Martina Trevisan	169	6
LIE	Kathinka von Deichmann	170	7
ITA	Jasmine Paolini	177	8

- ^{1} Rankings as of 25 June 2018.

=== Other entrants ===
The following players received a wildcard into the singles main draw:

- (Brazil) Karolayne Alexandre da Rosa
- (Italy) Cristiana Ferrando
- (Italy) Camilla Rosatello
- (Italy) Stefania Rubini

The following player received entry using a protected ranking:

- (Hungary) Réka Luca Jani

The following players received entry from the qualifying draw:

- (Switzerland) Lisa Sabino
- (Russia) Liudmila Samsonova
- (Italy) Lucrezia Stefanini
- (Czech Republic) Anastasia Zarycká

== Champions ==
=== Singles ===
- (Ukraine) Dayana Yastremska def. (Russia) Anastasia Potapova, 6–1, 6–0

=== Doubles ===
- (Brazil) Laura Pigossi / (Mexico) Renata Zarazúa def. (Italy) Anastasia Grymalska / (Italy) Giorgia Marchetti, 6–1, 4–6, [13–11]
