= 2019 Advantage Cars Prague Open – Men's doubles =

Men's doubles
- 2019 Advantage Cars Prague Open

Final
- Champions: (Uruguay) Ariel Behar (Ecuador) Gonzalo Escobar
- Runners-up: (Kazakhstan) Andrey Golubev (Kazakhstan) Aleksandr Nedovyesov
- Score: 6–7^{(4–7)}, 7–5, [10–8]

Events
Singles	men	women
Doubles	men	women
- Advantage Cars Prague Open

The men's doubles of the 2019 Advantage Cars Prague Open tournament was played on clay in Prague, Czech Republic.

Sander Gillé and Joran Vliegen were the defending champions but chose not to defend their title.

Ariel Behar and Gonzalo Escobar won the title after defeating Andrey Golubev and Aleksandr Nedovyesov 6–7^{(4–7)}, 7–5, [10–8] in the final.

== Seeds ==
1. (United States) Nathaniel Lammons / (Venezuela) Luis David Martínez (first round)
2. (Brazil) Fabrício Neis / (Brazil) Fernando Romboli (first round, retired)
3. (Uruguay) Ariel Behar / (Ecuador) Gonzalo Escobar (champions)
4. (India) Sriram Balaji / (India) Vishnu Vardhan (first round)

== Draw ==
Key

- Q = Qualifier
- WC = Wild card
- LL = Lucky loser
- Alt = Alternate
- ITF = ITF entry
- PR = Protected ranking
- SR = Special ranking
- SE = Special exempt
- JE = Junior exempt
- JR = Junior Accelerator Programme entrant
- CO = College Accelerator Programme entrant
- NG = Next Gen Accelerator Program entrant
- w/o = Walkover
- r = Retired
- d = Defaulted

First round
1	(United States) N Lammons (Venezuela) LD Martínez	3	2
ITF	(France) Tom Jomby (Brazil) F Meligeni Alves	6	6
WC	(Czech Republic) J Šátral (Czech Republic) Robin Staněk	5	6	[5]
ITF	(Egypt) K-M Maamoun (Peru) A Merino	7	4	[10]
3	(Uruguay) A Behar (Ecuador) G Escobar	6	6
(France) G Blancaneaux (France) K de Schepper	3	3
(Croatia) T Draganja (Serbia) N Milojević	3	6	[10]
WC	(Poland) J Zieliński (Poland) K Żuk	6	3	[7]
(Spain) D Gimeno Traver (Spain) B Zapata Miralles	2	3
(Poland) K Drzewiecki (Poland) S Walków	6	6
(Germany) A Begemann (Romania) F Mergea	7^{7}	2	[10]
4	(India) S Balaji (India) V Vardhan	6^{4}	6	[8]
WC	(Kazakhstan) A Golubev (Kazakhstan) A Nedovyesov	6	7^{7}
(Lithuania) L Grigelis (Netherlands) M Vervoort	2	6^{2}
(Australia) S Puodziunas (Netherlands) J Sels	6	0
2	(Brazil) F Neis (Brazil) F Romboli	3	1^{r}

Quarterfinals
ITF	(France) T Jomby (Brazil) F Meligeni Alves	7^{7}	6
ITF	(Egypt) K-M Maamoun (Peru) A Merino	6^{5}	4
3	(Uruguay) A Behar (Ecuador) G Escobar	6	6
(Croatia) T Draganja (Serbia) N Milojević	1	2
(Poland) K Drzewiecki (Poland) S Walków	3	3
(Germany) A Begemann (Romania) F Mergea	6	6
WC	(Kazakhstan) A Golubev (Kazakhstan) A Nedovyesov	6	7^{7}
(Australia) S Puodziunas (Netherlands) J Sels	4	6^{0}

Semifinals
ITF	(France) T Jomby (Brazil) F Meligeni Alves	3	7^{13}	[4]
3	(Uruguay) A Behar (Ecuador) G Escobar	6	6^{11}	[10]
(Germany) A Begemann (Romania) F Mergea	4	2
WC	(Kazakhstan) A Golubev (Kazakhstan) A Nedovyesov	6	6

Final
3	(Uruguay) A Behar (Ecuador) G Escobar	6^{4}	7	[10]
WC	(Kazakhstan) A Golubev (Kazakhstan) A Nedovyesov	7^{7}	5	[8]
