= 2011 Torneo Internazionale Femminile Antico Tiro a Volo – Doubles =

Doubles
- 2011 Torneo Internazionale Femminile Antico Tiro a Volo

Final
- Champions: (Australia) Sophie Ferguson (Australia) Sally Peers
- Runners-up: (Poland) Magda Linette (Romania) Liana Ungur
- Score: Walkover

Events
Singles	Doubles
← 2010 ·	Torneo Internazionale Femminile Antico Tiro a Volo	· 2012 →

Christina McHale and Olivia Rogowska are the defending champions but chose not to defend their title.
Sophie Ferguson and Sally Peers defeated Magda Linette and Liana Ungur in the final by a walkover.

== Seeds ==
1. (Australia) Daniella Dominikovic / (Australia) Jessica Moore (semifinals)
2. (Australia) Sophie Ferguson / (Australia) Sally Peers (champions)
3. (Australia) Isabella Holland / (China) Liu Wanting (second round)
4. (Russia) Marina Shamayko / (Georgia (country)) Sofia Shapatava (semifinals)

== Draw ==
=== Key ===
- Q = Qualifier
- WC = Wild card
- LL = Lucky loser
- Alt = Alternate
- SE = Special exempt
- PR = Protected ranking
- ITF = ITF entry
- JE = Junior exempt
- w/o = Walkover
- r = Retired
- d = Defaulted
- SR = Special ranking

=== Draw ===
First round
WC	(Brazil) G Miró (Italy) M Moroni
(Italy) G Bruzzone (Italy) C Orsi	w/o
(Poland) M Linette (Romania) L Ungur	4
(Italy) N Burnett (Italy) A-G Remondina	1r
(Ukraine) T Luzhanska (Japan) K Nara	6	6
(Brazil) I Miró (Brazil) L Pigossi	2	1

Quarterfinals
1	(Australia) D Dominikovic (Australia) J Moore	6	6
(Italy) G Bruzzone (Italy) C Orsi	1	3
3	(Australia) I Holland (China) W Liu	3	1
(Poland) M Linette (Romania) L Ungur	6	6
(Spain) L Costas-Moreira (Spain) B García Vidagany	1	6^{2}
4	(Russia) M Shamayko (Georgia (country)) S Shapatava	6	7
(Ukraine) T Luzhanska (Japan) K Nara	5	4
2	(Australia) S Ferguson (Australia) S Peers	7	6

Semifinals
1	(Australia) D Dominikovic (Australia) J Moore	6	5	[4]
(Poland) M Linette (Romania) L Ungur	4	7	[10]
4	(Russia) M Shamayko (Georgia (country)) S Shapatava	4	6	[5]
2	(Australia) S Ferguson (Australia) S Peers	6	3	[10]

Final
(Poland) M Linette (Romania) L Ungur
2	(Australia) S Ferguson (Australia) S Peers	w/o
