= 2019 Advantage Cars Prague Open – Men's singles =

Men's singles
- 2019 Advantage Cars Prague Open

Final
- Champion: (Spain) Mario Vilella Martínez
- Runner-up: (Chinese Taipei) Tseng Chun-hsin
- Score: 6–4, 6–2

Events
Singles	men	women
Doubles	men	women
- Advantage Cars Prague Open

The men's singles of the 2019 Advantage Cars Prague Open tournament was played on clay in Prague, Czech Republic.

Lukáš Rosol was the defending champion but lost in the quarterfinals to Carlos Taberner.

Mario Vilella Martínez won the title after defeating Tseng Chun-hsin 6–4, 6–2 in the final.

== Seeds ==
All seeds receive a bye into the second round.

1. (Slovakia) Andrej Martin (second round)
2. (Czech Republic) Lukáš Rosol (quarterfinals)
3. (Italy) Lorenzo Giustino (quarterfinals)
4. (Italy) Alessandro Giannessi (second round)
5. (Serbia) Nikola Milojević (third round)
6. (Kazakhstan) Aleksandr Nedovyesov (second round)
7. (France) Constant Lestienne (third round)
8. (Germany) Mats Moraing (third round)
9. (Hungary) Attila Balázs (third round)
10. (Brazil) Rogério Dutra Silva (second round)
11. (Spain) Bernabé Zapata Miralles (quarterfinals)
12. (Italy) Luca Vanni (second round)
13. (Egypt) Mohamed Safwat (third round)
14. (France) Tristan Lamasine (second round)
15. (Spain) Daniel Gimeno Traver (second round)
16. (Belarus) Uladzimir Ignatik (second round)

== Draw ==
Key

- Q = Qualifier
- WC = Wild card
- LL = Lucky loser
- Alt = Alternate
- ITF = ITF entry
- PR = Protected ranking
- SR = Special ranking
- SE = Special exempt
- JE = Junior exempt
- JR = Junior Accelerator Programme entrant
- CO = College Accelerator Programme entrant
- NG = Next Gen Accelerator Program entrant
- w/o = Walkover
- r = Retired
- d = Defaulted

=== Finals ===
Quarterfinals
(Chinese Taipei) Tseng Chun-hsin	5	6	6
11	(Spain) Bernabé Zapata Miralles	7	4	3
WC	(Slovakia) Lukáš Klein	6	1	0
(Portugal) Frederico Ferreira Silva	3	6	6
(Spain) Mario Vilella Martínez	6	7^{9}
3	(Italy) Lorenzo Giustino	0	6^{7}
(Spain) Carlos Taberner	6	6
2	(Czech Republic) Lukáš Rosol	2	2

Semifinals
(Chinese Taipei) Tseng Chun-hsin	6	6
(Portugal) Frederico Ferreira Silva	1	4
(Spain) Mario Vilella Martínez	7	6
(Spain) Carlos Taberner	5	2

Final
(Chinese Taipei) Tseng Chun-hsin	4	2
(Spain) Mario Vilella Martínez	6	6

=== Top half ===
==== Section 1 ====
First round
(Chinese Taipei) C-h Tseng	6^{5}	6	7^{7}
(France) A Müller	7^{7}	4	6^{4}
ITF	(Germany) Peter Heller	6	6
Q	(Czech Republic) V Kopřiva	2	3
(Lithuania) L Grigelis	2	0
(Czech Republic) A Pavlásek	6	6
ITF	(France) Tom Jomby	1	2
(Brazil) P Sakamoto	6	6

Second round
1	(Slovakia) A Martin	2	7^{7}	2
(Chinese Taipei) C-h Tseng	6	6^{3}	6
ITF	(Germany) P Heller	6	6
16	(Belarus) U Ignatik	1	4
11	(Spain) B Zapata Miralles	2	6	6
(Czech Republic) A Pavlásek	6	1	4
(Brazil) P Sakamoto	4	5
7	(France) C Lestienne	6	7

Third round
(Chinese Taipei) C-h Tseng	6^{2}	6	6
ITF	(Germany) P Heller	7^{7}	3	3
11	(Spain) B Zapata Miralles	6	6^{6}	7^{7}
7	(France) C Lestienne	3	7^{8}	6^{1}

Quarterfinals
(Chinese Taipei) C-h Tseng	5	6	6
11	(Spain) B Zapata Miralles	7	4	3

==== Section 2 ====
First round
(Argentina) A Collarini	6	6
ITF	(France) C Denolly	1	2
Alt	(Czech Republic) M Vrbenský	3	6	5
WC	(Slovakia) L Klein	6	3	7
(Netherlands) J Sels	2	6	2
(Portugal) F Ferreira Silva	6	3	6
(Kazakhstan) D Yevseyev	1	1
(Croatia) N Serdarušić	6	6

Second round
4	(Italy) A Giannessi	0	2
(Argentina) A Collarini	6	6
WC	(Slovakia) L Klein	6	6^{4}	6
15	(Spain) D Gimeno Traver	3	7^{7}	2
10	(Brazil) R Dutra Silva	6^{1}	5
(Portugal) F Ferreira Silva	7^{7}	7
(Croatia) N Serdarušić	3	3
8	(Germany) M Moraing	6	6

Third round
(Argentina) A Collarini	4	3
WC	(Slovakia) L Klein	6	6
(Portugal) F Ferreira Silva	6	6
8	(Germany) M Moraing	1	4

Quarterfinals
WC	(Slovakia) L Klein	6	1	0
(Portugal) F Ferreira Silva	3	6	6

=== Bottom half ===
==== Section 3 ====
First round
WC	(United States) M Damm	1	1
(Spain) M Vilella Martínez	6	6
(Czech Republic) J Šátral	3	6	6
Q	(Czech Republic) Pavel Nejedlý	6	3	2
(Czech Republic) V Šafránek	6	6
(France) G Blancaneaux	3	4
(France) TK Wang	4	6	6
WC	(Czech Republic) J Lehečka	6	4	3

Second round
6	(Kazakhstan) A Nedovyesov	2	1
(Spain) M Vilella Martínez	6	6
(Czech Republic) J Šátral	5	6^{4}
9	(Hungary) A Balázs	7	7^{7}
14	(France) T Lamasine	6^{4}	1
(Czech Republic) V Šafránek	7^{7}	6
(France) TK Wang	3	2
3	(Italy) L Giustino	6	6

Third round
(Spain) M Vilella Martínez	6	6
9	(Hungary) A Balázs	4	3
(Czech Republic) V Šafránek	3	2
3	(Italy) L Giustino	6	6

Quarterfinals
(Spain) M Vilella Martínez	6	7^{9}
3	(Italy) L Giustino	0	6^{7}

==== Section 4 ====
First round
(United Kingdom) J Choinski	6	6^{3}	6
(Bosnia and Herzegovina) A Šetkić	3	7^{7}	2
WC	(Czech Republic) J Forejtek	3	3
(Spain) C Taberner	6	6
ITF	(Egypt) K-M Maamoun	7^{7}	6^{2}	0
ITF	(Italy) R Bonadio	6^{0}	7^{7}	6
WC	(Czech Republic) Robin Staněk	2	6	4
(France) K de Schepper	6	2	6

Second round
5	(Serbia) N Milojević	6	6
(United Kingdom) J Choinski	3	0
(Spain) C Taberner	6	6
12	(Italy) L Vanni	2	4
13	(Egypt) M Safwat	7^{7}	7^{7}
ITF	(Italy) R Bonadio	6^{2}	6^{5}
(France) K de Schepper	6	6^{2}	3
2	(Czech Republic) L Rosol	3	7^{7}	6

Third round
5	(Serbia) N Milojević	4	3
(Spain) C Taberner	6	6
13	(Egypt) M Safwat	6	3	2
2	(Czech Republic) L Rosol	4	6	6

Quarterfinals
(Spain) C Taberner	6	6
2	(Czech Republic) L Rosol	2	2
