= 2026 ATV Tennis Open – Doubles =

Doubles
- 2026 ATV Tennis Open

Final
- Champions: (France) Estelle Cascino (China) Feng Shuo
- Runners-up: (Croatia) Lucija Ćirić Bagarić (Slovenia) Nika Radišić
- Score: 6–4, 6–4

Details
- Draw: 8 (1WC)
- Seeds: 2

Events
Singles	Doubles
- ATV Tennis Open

Cho I-hsuan and Cho Yi-tsen were the reigning champions, but did not participate this year.

Estelle Cascino and Feng Shuo won the title, defeating Lucija Ćirić Bagarić and Nika Radišić 6–4, 6–4 in the final.

== Seeds ==
1. (France) Estelle Cascino / (China) Feng Shuo (champions)
2. (Croatia) Lucija Ćirić Bagarić / (Slovenia) Nika Radišić (final)

== Draw ==
Key

- Q = Qualifier
- WC = Wild card
- LL = Lucky loser
- Alt = Alternate
- ITF = ITF entry
- PR = Protected ranking
- SR = Special ranking
- SE = Special exempt
- JE = Junior exempt
- JR = Junior Accelerator Programme entrant
- CO = College Accelerator Programme entrant
- NG = Next Gen Accelerator Program entrant
- w/o = Walkover
- r = Retired
- d = Defaulted

=== Draw ===
Quarterfinals
1	(France) E Cascino (China) S Feng	6	2	[10]
WC	(Italy) L Bronzetti (Italy) M Trevisan	2	6	[8]
(Serbia) L Radivojević (Italy) D Spiteri	1	2
(Italy) N Brancaccio (Italy) TC Grant	6	6
(Switzerland) N Karamoko (Latvia) D Semeņistaja	2	4
(India) R Bhosale (Chinese Taipei) Y-y Li	6	6
D Astakhova; S Lansere	4	5
2	(Croatia) L Ćirić Bagarić (Slovenia) N Radišić	6	7

Semifinals
1	(France) E Cascino (China) S Feng	6	0	[10]
(Italy) N Brancaccio (Italy) TC Grant	4	6	[8]
(India) R Bhosale (Chinese Taipei) Y-y Li	1	4
2	(Croatia) L Ćirić Bagarić (Slovenia) N Radišić	6	6

Final
1	(France) E Cascino (China) S Feng	6	6
2	(Croatia) L Ćirić Bagarić (Slovenia) N Radišić	4	4
