= 2026 ATV Tennis Open =

- Date: 13–19 July 2026
- Edition: 16th
- Category: WTA 125
- Prize money: €100,000
- Surface: Clay / Outdoor
- Location: Rome, Italy
- Venue: Circolo Antico Tiro a Volo

Champions

Singles
- (United Kingdom) Francesca Jones

Doubles
- (France) Estelle Cascino / (China) Feng Shuo
- ATV Tennis Open

The 2026 ATV Tennis Open (also known as the ATV Bancomat Tennis Open for sponsorship reasons) was a professional women's tennis tournament played on outdoor clay courts. It was the sixteenth edition of the tournament, and part of the 2026 WTA 125 tournaments. It took place in Rome, Italy, between 13 and 19 July 2026.

== Singles main-draw entrants ==
=== Seeds ===
Country	Player	Rank	Seed
ESP	Oksana Selekhmeteva	91	1
LAT	Darja Semeņistaja	104	2
GBR	Francesca Jones	106	3
ITA	Lucia Bronzetti	125	4
SRB	Lola Radivojević	148	5
GER	Noma Noha Akugue	153	6
ITA	Nuria Brancaccio	170	7
ITA	Tyra Caterina Grant	172	8

- Rankings are as of 6 July 2026.

=== Other entrants ===
The following players received wildcards into the singles main draw:

- (Italy) Deborah Chiesa
- (Italy) Francesca Pace
- (Italy) Martina Trevisan
- (Italy) Aurora Zantedeschi

The following player received entry into the main draw through protected ranking:

- (Montenegro) Danka Kovinić

The following players received entry from the qualifying draw:

- (Italy) Noemi Basiletti
- (Ukraine) Yelyzaveta Kotliar
- (Estonia) Elena Malygina
- (Italy) Alessandra Mazzola

=== Withdrawals ===
Before the tournament

- (France) Loïs Boisson → replaced by (Italy) Dalila Spiteri
- (Netherlands) Anouk Koevermans → replaced by (Italy) Federica Urgesi
- (Spain) Guiomar Maristany → replaced by (China) Ren Yufei
- (France) Tiantsoa Rakotomanga Rajaonah → replaced by Sofya Lansere
- (France) Alice Tubello → replaced by Darya Astakhova

== Doubles main-draw entrants ==
=== Seeds ===
Country	Player	Country	Player	Rank^{1}	Seed
FRA	Estelle Cascino	CHN	Feng Shuo	224	1
CRO	Lucija Ćirić Bagarić	SLO	Nika Radišić	241	2

- ^{1} Rankings are as of 7 July 2026.

=== Other entrants ===
The following pair received a wildcard into the doubles main draw:

- (Italy) Lucia Bronzetti / (Italy) Martina Trevisan

== Champions ==
=== Singles ===
- (United Kingdom) Francesca Jones def. (Italy) Lucia Bronzetti 6–3, 6–1

=== Doubles ===
- (France) Estelle Cascino / (China) Feng Shuo def. (Croatia) Lucija Ćirić Bagarić / (Slovenia) Nika Radišić 6–4, 6–4
