= 2011 Torneo Internazionale Femminile Antico Tiro a Volo – Singles =

Singles
- 2011 Torneo Internazionale Femminile Antico Tiro a Volo

Final
- Champion: (United States) Christina McHale
- Runner-up: (Russia) Ekaterina Ivanova
- Score: 6–2, 6–4

Events
Singles	Doubles
← 2010 ·	Torneo Internazionale Femminile Antico Tiro a Volo	· 2012 →

Lourdes Domínguez Lino is the defending champion but chose not to participate this year.
Christina McHale defeated Ekaterina Ivanova in the final 6–2, 6–4.

== Seeds ==
1. (Italy) Maria Elena Camerin (second round)
2. (Japan) Kurumi Nara (quarterfinals)
3. (Australia) Sophie Ferguson (second round)
4. (France) Iryna Brémond (quarterfinals)
5. (Italy) Corinna Dentoni (first round)
6. (Luxembourg) Mandy Minella (second round)
7. (Russia) Ekaterina Ivanova (final)
8. (Russia) Nina Bratchikova (semifinals)

== Draw ==
=== Key ===
- Q = Qualifier
- WC = Wild card
- LL = Lucky loser
- Alt = Alternate
- SE = Special exempt
- PR = Protected ranking
- ITF = ITF entry
- JE = Junior exempt
- w/o = Walkover
- r = Retired
- d = Defaulted
- SR = Special ranking

=== Finals ===
Semifinals
Q	(United States) Christina McHale	6	1
(Romania) Liana Ungur	0	0^{r}
8	(Russia) Nina Bratchikova	2	6	1
7	(Russia) Ekaterina Ivanova	6	1	6

Final
Q	(United States) Christina McHale	6	6
7	(Russia) Ekaterina Ivanova	2	4

=== Top half ===
First round
1	(Italy) ME Camerin	2	6	7
LL	(Italy) S Chieppa	6	4	5
(Poland) M Linette	6^{7}	4
Q	(United States) C McHale	7	7
LL	(Italy) C Orsi	4	0
(Spain) L Costas-Moreira	6	6
Q	(Italy) K Knapp	6	6
5	(Italy) C Dentoni	3	3
3	(Australia) S Ferguson	4	6	6
(France) C Feuerstein	6	1	4
(Slovakia) K Kučová	3	2
(Ukraine) T Luzhanska	6	6
(Romania) L Ungur	6	6
Q	(Australia) J Moore	1	1
(Spain) E Cabeza Candela	2	4
6	(Luxembourg) M Minella	6	6

Second round
1	(Italy) ME Camerin	1	2
Q	(United States) C McHale	6	6
(Spain) L Costas-Moreira	6	6
Q	(Italy) K Knapp	4	3
3	(Australia) S Ferguson	5	6	4
(Ukraine) T Luzhanska	7	3	6
(Romania) L Ungur	6	6
6	(Luxembourg) M Minella	4	3

Quarterfinals
Q	(United States) C McHale	6	6
(Spain) L Costas-Moreira	3	3
(Ukraine) T Luzhanska	2	0
(Romania) L Ungur	6	6

Semifinals
Q	(United States) C McHale	6	1
(Romania) L Ungur	0	0^{r}

=== Bottom half ===
First round
8	(Russia) N Bratchikova	6	7
(Italy) A Floris	2	6^{5}
WC	(Russia) M Shamayko	7	6
WC	(Italy) G Marchetti	6^{3}	3
LL	(Spain) S Solsona Carcasona	0	3
LL	(Italy) F di Sarra	6	6
(Spain) B García Vidagany	2	1
4	(France) I Brémond	6	6
7	(Russia) E Ivanova	2	6	6
(Australia) S Peers	6	2	4
(Italy) A-G Remondina	6	6
WC	(Kazakhstan) A Arginbayeva	0	0
(Georgia (country)) M Chakhnashvili	6	4	6
Q	(Australia) I Holland	3	6	3
WC	(Bulgaria) M Gledacheva	1	5
2	(Japan) K Nara	6	7

Second round
8	(Russia) N Bratchikova	6	6
WC	(Russia) M Shamayko	2	4
LL	(Italy) F di Sarra	0	4
4	(France) I Brémond	6	6
7	(Russia) E Ivanova	1	7	6
(Italy) A-G Remondina	6	6^{5}	1
(Georgia (country)) M Chakhnashvili	3	5
2	(Japan) K Nara	6	7

Quarterfinals
8	(Russia) N Bratchikova	7	6
4	(France) I Brémond	5	4
7	(Russia) E Ivanova	7	6
2	(Japan) K Nara	5	3

Semifinals
8	(Russia) N Bratchikova	2	6	1
7	(Russia) E Ivanova	6	1	6
