= 2023 Women's TEC Cup – Doubles =

Doubles
- 2023 Women's TEC Cup

Final
- Champions: (India) Prarthana Thombare; Anastasia Tikhonova
- Runners-up: (France) Estelle Cascino (Latvia) Diāna Marcinkēviča
- Score: 3–6, 6–1, [10–7]

Events
Singles	Doubles
Women's TEC Cup	· 2024 →

This was the first edition of the tournament.

Prarthana Thombare and Anastasia Tikhonova won the title, defeating Estelle Cascino and Diāna Marcinkēviča in the final, 3–6, 6–1, [10–7].

== Seeds ==
1. (Spain) Georgina García Pérez / (Greece) Despina Papamichail (first round)
2. (India) Prarthana Thombare / Anastasia Tikhonova (champions)
3. (France) Estelle Cascino / (Latvia) Diāna Marcinkēviča (final)
4. (Spain) Yvonne Cavallé Reimers / (United Kingdom) Emily Webley-Smith (quarterfinals)

== Draw ==
=== Key ===
- Q = Qualifier
- WC = Wild card
- LL = Lucky loser
- Alt = Alternate
- SE = Special exempt
- PR = Protected ranking
- ITF = ITF entry
- JE = Junior exempt
- w/o = Walkover
- r = Retired
- d = Defaulted
- SR = Special ranking

First round
1	(Spain) G García Pérez (Greece) D Papamichail	6	1	[5]
(Bulgaria) L Karatancheva (Bulgaria) I Shinikova	2	6	[10]
WC	(Spain) A Ferlito (Spain) M García Cid	2	1
(Spain) E Guerrero Álvarez (Spain) G Maristany	6	6
3	(France) E Cascino (Latvia) D Marcinkēviča	4	6	[10]
(Philippines) A Eala (United Kingdom) E Lindh	6	3	[3]
A Charaeva (Israel) L Glushko	5	2
(United Kingdom) M Brooks (United Kingdom) H Hutchinson	7	6
(France) N Berecoechea (South Africa) I Kruger	6	6
(Switzerland) C Fontenel (Germany) S-R Sekulic	3	3
(China) M Liu (United States) R Newborn	3	1
4	(Spain) Y Cavallé Reimers (United Kingdom) E Webley-Smith	6	6
WC	(Spain) J Hernández Miranda (Spain) P Ortega Redondo	3	5
(Netherlands) A Hartono (Chile) D Seguel	6	7
A Gureva; K Zaytseva	4	6	[8]
2	(India) P Thombare; A Tikhonova	6	2	[10]

Quarterfinals
(Bulgaria) L Karatancheva (Bulgaria) I Shinikova	6	2	[10]
(Spain) E Guerrero Álvarez (Spain) G Maristany	2	6	[7]
3	(France) E Cascino (Latvia) D Marcinkēviča	3	6	[10]
(United Kingdom) M Brooks (United Kingdom) H Hutchinson	6	2	[3]
(France) N Berecoechea (South Africa) I Kruger	6	7
4	(Spain) Y Cavallé Reimers (United Kingdom) E Webley-Smith	2	5
(Netherlands) A Hartono (Chile) D Seguel	2	3
2	(India) P Thombare; A Tikhonova	6	6

Semifinals
(Bulgaria) L Karatancheva (Bulgaria) I Shinikova	3	3
3	(France) E Cascino (Latvia) D Marcinkēviča	6	6
(France) N Berecoechea (South Africa) I Kruger	1	5
2	(India) P Thombare; A Tikhonova	6	7

Final
3	(France) E Cascino (Latvia) D Marcinkēviča	6	1	[7]
2	(India) P Thombare; A Tikhonova	3	6	[10]
