= 2022 Torneo Internazionale Femminile Antico Tiro a Volo – Singles =

Singles
- 2022 Torneo Internazionale Femminile Antico Tiro a Volo

Final
- Champion: (Croatia) Tara Würth
- Runner-up: (France) Chloé Paquet
- Score: 6–3, 6–4

Events
Singles	Doubles
← 2019 ·	Torneo Internazionale Femminile Antico Tiro a Volo	· 2023 →

Sara Errani was the defending champion but withdrew before the tournament began.

Tara Würth won the title, defeating Chloé Paquet in the final, 6–3, 6–4.

== Seeds ==
1. (France) Chloé Paquet (final)
2. (Romania) Irina Bara (second round)
3. Elina Avanesyan (quarterfinals)
4. (France) Fiona Ferro (first round)
5. (Andorra) Victoria Jiménez Kasintseva (first round)
6. (Argentina) Paula Ormaechea (first round)
7. Anastasia Tikhonova (second round)
8. (Australia) Olivia Gadecki (quarterfinals)

== Draw ==
=== Key ===
- Q = Qualifier
- WC = Wild card
- LL = Lucky loser
- Alt = Alternate
- SE = Special exempt
- PR = Protected ranking
- ITF = ITF entry
- JE = Junior exempt
- w/o = Walkover
- r = Retired
- d = Defaulted
- SR = Special ranking

=== Finals ===
Semifinals
1	(France) Chloé Paquet	6	6
(Cyprus) Raluca Șerban	2	2
Q	(Croatia) Tara Würth	6	6
Q	Diana Shnaider	2	4

Final
1	(France) Chloé Paquet	3	4
Q	(Croatia) Tara Würth	6	6

=== Top half ===
First round
1	(France) C Paquet	6	6
(Italy) C Rosatello	4	3
WC	(Italy) B Turati	6	2	7^{7}
(Australia) P Hon	4	6	6^{5}
Q	(Italy) M Di Giuseppe	4	6^{4}
Q	(Romania) A Prisăcariu	6	7^{7}
(Spain) Á Fita Boluda	5	3
8	(Australia) O Gadecki	7	6
4	(France) F Ferro	3	6	2
(Italy) F Di Sarra	6	3	6
(Cyprus) R Șerban	6	6
Q	(France) S Cakarevic	2	3
(Italy) L Stefanini	6	7^{7}
(Germany) A-L Friedsam	2	6^{4}
Q	(Italy) L Pigato	4	4
7	A Tikhonova	6	6

Second round
1	(France) C Paquet	6	6
WC	(Italy) B Turati	0	1
Q	(Romania) A Prisăcariu	0	0
8	(Australia) O Gadecki	6	6
(Italy) F Di Sarra	7	0	2
(Cyprus) R Șerban	5	6	6
(Italy) L Stefanini	6	6
7	A Tikhonova	1	1

Quarterfinals
1	(France) C Paquet	7^{7}	3	6
8	(Australia) O Gadecki	6^{5}	6	0
(Cyprus) R Șerban	3	7^{7}	6
(Italy) L Stefanini	6	6^{3}	3

Semifinals
1	(France) C Paquet	6	6
(Cyprus) R Șerban	2	2

=== Bottom half ===
First round
6	(Argentina) P Ormaechea	4	6	4
(United States) L Chirico	6	4	6
Q	(Croatia) T Würth	6	6
(Brazil) G Cé	1	2
WC	(Italy) D Cherubini	5	6	6
WC	(Italy) M Paoletti	7	3	1
Q	(Italy) S Rubini	6^{6}	5
3	E Avanesyan	7^{8}	7
5	(Andorra) V Jiménez Kasintseva	6	5	1
WC	(Italy) V Meliss	3	7	6
(Bulgaria) I Shinikova	7^{7}	6
LL	(Italy) A Raggi	6^{4}	4
Q	D Shnaider	5	6	6
(Slovakia) R Šramková	7	4	4
Q	(Italy) N Brancaccio	4	6	1
2	(Romania) I Bara	6	2	6

Second round
(United States) L Chirico	2	2
Q	(Croatia) T Würth	6	6
WC	(Italy) D Cherubini	5	7^{7}	3
3	E Avanesyan	7	6^{5}	6
WC	(Italy) V Meliss	3	2
(Bulgaria) I Shinikova	6	6
Q	D Shnaider	3	6	6
2	(Romania) I Bara	6	4	1

Quarterfinals
Q	(Croatia) T Würth	7	2	6
3	E Avanesyan	5	6	3
(Bulgaria) I Shinikova	3	2
Q	D Shnaider	6	6

Semifinals
Q	(Croatia) T Würth	6	6
Q	D Shnaider	2	4
