= 2023 Women's TEC Cup =

Tennis tournament

- Date: 31 July–6 August 2023
- Edition: 1st
- Category: ITF Women's World Tennis Tour
- Prize money: $60,000
- Surface: Hard / Outdoor
- Location: Barcelona, Spain

Champions

Singles
- (Australia) Arina Rodionova

Doubles
- (India) Prarthana Thombare / Anastasia Tikhonova
- Women's TEC Cup

The 2023 Women's TEC Cup was a professional tennis tournament played on outdoor hard courts. It was the first edition of the tournament, which was part of the 2023 ITF Women's World Tennis Tour. It took place in Barcelona, Spain, between 31 July and 6 August 2023.

== Champions ==
=== Singles ===
- (Australia) Arina Rodionova def. Valeria Savinykh, 6–4, 5–7, 6–1

=== Doubles ===
- (India) Prarthana Thombare / Anastasia Tikhonova def. (France) Estelle Cascino / (Latvia) Diāna Marcinkēviča, 3–6, 6–1, [10–7]

== Singles main draw entrants ==
=== Seeds ===
Country	Player	Rank	Seed
GBR	Harriet Dart	134	1
GER	Eva Lys	167	2
	Valeria Savinykh	191	3
NED	Arianne Hartono	198	4
AUS	Arina Rodionova	199	5
GRE	Despina Papamichail	211	6
BEL	Magali Kempen	223	7
	Anastasia Tikhonova	238	8

- Rankings are as of 24 July 2023.

=== Other entrants ===
The following players received wildcards into the singles main draw:

- (Spain) Yvonne Cavallé Reimers
- (Spain) Marta García Cid
- (Spain) Georgina García Pérez
- (Spain) Guiomar Maristany

The following player received entry into the singles main draw using a special ranking:

- (Australia) Arina Rodionova

The following player received entry into the singles main draw using as a special exempt:

- Maria Bondarenko

The following players received entry from the qualifying draw:

- (France) Nahia Berecoechea
- (China) Gao Xinyu
- Anastasiia Gureva
- (Denmark) Olga Helmi
- (South Africa) Isabella Kruger
- (United Kingdom) Emilie Lindh
- (Latvia) Diāna Marcinkēviča
- (Bulgaria) Isabella Shinikova
