= Women's TEC Cup =

- 2023 Women's TEC Cup

Women's World Tennis Tour
- Event name: Women's TEC Cup
- Location: Cornellà de Llobregat, Spain
- Venue: TEC Carles Ferrer Salat
- Category: ITF Women's World Tennis Tour
- Surface: Hard / outdoor
- Draw: 32S/32Q/16D
- Prize money: $60,000

The Women's TEC Cup is a tournament for professional female tennis players played on outdoor hardcourts. The event is classified as a $60,000 ITF Women's World Tennis Tour tournament and has been held in Cornellà de Llobregat, Spain, since 2023.

== Past finals ==
=== Singles ===
Year	Champion	Runner-up	Score
2024	(Serbia) Olga Danilović	(Netherlands) Arantxa Rus	6–2, 6–0
2023	(Australia) Arina Rodionova	Valeria Savinykh	6–4, 5–7, 6–1

=== Doubles ===
Year	Champions	Runners-up	Score
2024	(Spain) Yvonne Cavallé Reimers (Netherlands) Eva Vedder	(Algeria) Inès Ibbou (Switzerland) Naïma Karamoko	7–5, 7–6^{(7–5)}
2023	(India) Prarthana Thombare; Anastasia Tikhonova	(France) Estelle Cascino (Latvia) Diāna Marcinkēviča	3–6, 6–1, [10–7]
