= 2024 Women's TEC Cup – Singles =

Singles
- 2024 Women's TEC Cup

Final
- Champion: (Serbia) Olga Danilović
- Runner-up: (Netherlands) Arantxa Rus
- Score: 6–2, 6–0

Events
| Singles | Doubles |
| ← 2023 · | Women's TEC Cup | · 2025 → |

Arina Rodionova was the defending champion, but chose not to participate.

Olga Danilović won the title, defeating Arantxa Rus in the final; 6–2, 6–0.

== Seeds ==
1. (Spain) Nuria Párrizas Díaz (quarterfinals)
2. (Netherlands) Arantxa Rus (final)
3. (Argentina) María Lourdes Carlé (second round)
4. (Serbia) Olga Danilović (champion)
5. (United Kingdom) Sonay Kartal (first round)
6. (Slovakia) Anna Karolína Schmiedlová (first round)
7. (Spain) Rebeka Masarova (withdrew)
8. (Ukraine) Daria Snigur (first round)

== Draw ==
=== Key ===
- Q = Qualifier
- WC = Wild card
- LL = Lucky loser
- Alt = Alternate
- SE = Special exempt
- PR = Protected ranking
- ITF = ITF entry
- JE = Junior exempt
- w/o = Walkover
- r = Retired
- d = Defaulted
- SR = Special ranking

=== Finals ===
Semifinals
Polina Kudermetova | 4 | 4
4 | (Serbia) Olga Danilović | 6 | 6
(United States) Ann Li | 7^{7} | 1 | 3
2 | (Netherlands) Arantxa Rus | 6^{3} | 6 | 6

Final
4 | (Serbia) Olga Danilović | 6 | 6
2 | (Netherlands) Arantxa Rus | 2 | 0

=== Top half ===
First round
1 | (Spain) N Párrizas Díaz | 6 | 6
WC | (Spain) L Cortez Llorca | 3 | 2
Q | (Turkey) C Büyükakçay | 6^{6} | 3
Q | (Croatia) P Marčinko | 7^{8} | 6
Q | (Bulgaria) L Karatancheva | 3 | 5
P Kudermetova | 6 | 7
Q | (Romania) L Tănăsie | 6 | 7^{9}
LL | (Germany) C Werner | 3 | 6^{7}
4 | (Serbia) O Danilović | 6 | 6
(Greece) D Papamichail | 4 | 1
WC | (Spain) A Mintegi del Olmo | 1 | 3
(Hungary) D Gálfi | 6 | 6
(Latvia) D Semeņistaja | 3 | 4
WC | (Spain) K Quevedo | 6 | 6
(Spain) G Maristany | 6 | 6
6 | (Slovakia) AK Schmiedlová | 3 | 3

Second round
1 | (Spain) N Párrizas Díaz | 7 | 6
Q | (Croatia) P Marčinko | 5 | 2
P Kudermetova | 5 | 6 | 6
Q | (Romania) L Tănăsie | 7 | 2 | 3
4 | (Serbia) O Danilović | 7^{8} | 1
(Hungary) D Gálfi | 6^{6} | 0^{r}
WC | (Spain) K Quevedo | 6 | 6
(Spain) G Maristany | 2 | 3

Quarterfinals
1 | (Spain) N Párrizas Díaz | 5 | 0
P Kudermetova | 7 | 6
4 | (Serbia) O Danilović | 6 | 6
WC | (Spain) K Quevedo | 0 | 2

Semifinals
P Kudermetova | 4 | 4
4 | (Serbia) O Danilović | 6 | 6

=== Bottom half ===
First round
8 | (Ukraine) D Snigur | 6^{7} | 2
Q | A Charaeva | 7^{9} | 6
(Andorra) V Jiménez Kasintseva | 4 | 0
(United States) A Li | 6 | 6
Q | (Mexico) M Portillo Ramírez | 0 | 3
M Timofeeva | 6 | 6
Q | (Serbia) N Stojanović | 6 | 6^{2} | 2
3 | (Argentina) ML Carlé | 3 | 7^{7} | 6
5 | (United Kingdom) S Kartal | 6^{0} | 4
(Spain) M Bassols Ribera | 7^{7} | 6
(Switzerland) J Teichmann | 6 | 6
Q | (Spain) A Lázaro García | 2 | 4
WC | (Spain) N Torner Sensano | 4 | 2
(Portugal) F Jorge | 6 | 6
O Selekhmeteva | 2 | 1
2 | (Netherlands) A Rus | 6 | 6

Second round
Q | A Charaeva | 6 | 3 | 5
(United States) A Li | 4 | 6 | 7
M Timofeeva | 7 | 3 | 7^{7}
3 | (Argentina) ML Carlé | 5 | 6 | 6^{4}
(Spain) M Bassols Ribera | 6 | 6
(Switzerland) J Teichmann | 4 | 4
(Portugal) F Jorge | 6 | 6^{8} | 1
2 | (Netherlands) A Rus | 4 | 7^{10} | 6

Quarterfinals
(United States) A Li | 4
M Timofeeva | 3^{r}
(Spain) M Bassols Ribera | 5 | 4
2 | (Netherlands) A Rus | 7 | 6

Semifinals
(United States) A Li | 7^{7} | 1 | 3
2 | (Netherlands) A Rus | 6^{3} | 6 | 6
