= 2018 Torneo Internazionale Femminile Antico Tiro a Volo – Doubles =

Doubles
- 2018 Torneo Internazionale Femminile Antico Tiro a Volo

Final
- Champions: (Brazil) Laura Pigossi (Mexico) Renata Zarazúa
- Runners-up: (Italy) Anastasia Grymalska (Italy) Giorgia Marchetti
- Score: 6–1, 4–6, [13–11]

Events
Singles	Doubles
- Torneo Internazionale Femminile Antico Tiro a Volo

Anastasiya Komardina and Nadia Podoroska were the defending champions, but both chose not to participate.

Laura Pigossi and Renata Zarazúa won the title, defeating Anastasia Grymalska and Giorgia Marchetti in the final, 6–1, 4–6, [13–11].

== Seeds ==
1. (Japan) Rika Fujiwara / (India) Prarthana Thombare (first round)
2. (Slovakia) Michaela Hončová / (Spain) Sílvia Soler Espinosa (quarterfinals)
3. (Russia) Alena Fomina / (Russia) Ekaterina Yashina (quarterfinals)
4. (Romania) Cristina Dinu / (Belgium) An-Sophie Mestach (semifinals)

== Draw ==
Key

- Q = Qualifier
- WC = Wild card
- LL = Lucky loser
- Alt = Alternate
- ITF = ITF entry
- PR = Protected ranking
- SR = Special ranking
- SE = Special exempt
- JE = Junior exempt
- JR = Junior Accelerator Programme entrant
- CO = College Accelerator Programme entrant
- NG = Next Gen Accelerator Program entrant
- w/o = Walkover
- r = Retired
- d = Defaulted

=== Draw ===
First round
1	(Japan) R Fujiwara (India) P Thombare	3	4
WC	(Italy) D Chiesa (Italy) A Matteucci	6	6
(Romania) J Cristian (Czech Republic) A Zarycká	6	5	[8]
(Italy) A Grymalska (Italy) G Marchetti	2	7	[10]
4	(Romania) C Dinu (Belgium) A-S Mestach	6	6
(Italy) C Giovine (Brazil) TG Pedretti	2	2
(Italy) C Ferrando (Italy) C Rosatello	4	2
(Hungary) RL Jani (Slovakia) C Škamlová	6	6
WC	(Italy) T Pieri (Italy) L Stefanini	4	4
(Chinese Taipei) P-h Chen (Chinese Taipei) F-h Wu	6	6
(Slovakia) J Čepelová (Montenegro) D Kovinić	6	3	[4]
3	(Russia) A Fomina (Russia) E Yashina	3	6	[10]
(Brazil) L Pigossi (Mexico) R Zarazúa	6	6
WC	(Israel) V Ekshibarova (Italy) M Spigarelli	0	1
(Uzbekistan) A Amanmuradova (Russia) A Potapova	2	4
2	(Slovakia) M Hončová (Spain) S Soler Espinosa	6	6

Quarterfinals
WC	(Italy) D Chiesa (Italy) A Matteucci	6	5	[7]
(Italy) A Grymalska (Italy) G Marchetti	3	7	[10]
4	(Romania) C Dinu (Belgium) A-S Mestach	6	4	[16]
(Hungary) RL Jani (Slovakia) C Škamlová	4	6	[14]
(Chinese Taipei) P-h Chen (Chinese Taipei) F-h Wu	6	6
3	(Russia) A Fomina (Russia) E Yashina	4	4
(Brazil) L Pigossi (Mexico) R Zarazúa	6	2	[10]
2	(Slovakia) M Hončová (Spain) S Soler Espinosa	2	6	[5]

Semifinals
(Italy) A Grymalska (Italy) G Marchetti	6	1	[10]
4	(Romania) C Dinu (Belgium) A-S Mestach	1	6	[4]
(Chinese Taipei) P-h Chen (Chinese Taipei) F-h Wu	5	6	[10]
(Brazil) L Pigossi (Mexico) R Zarazúa	7	3	[12]

Final
(Italy) A Grymalska (Italy) G Marchetti	1	6	[11]
(Brazil) L Pigossi (Mexico) R Zarazúa	6	4	[13]
