= Eva Vedder =

Dutch tennis player (born 1999)

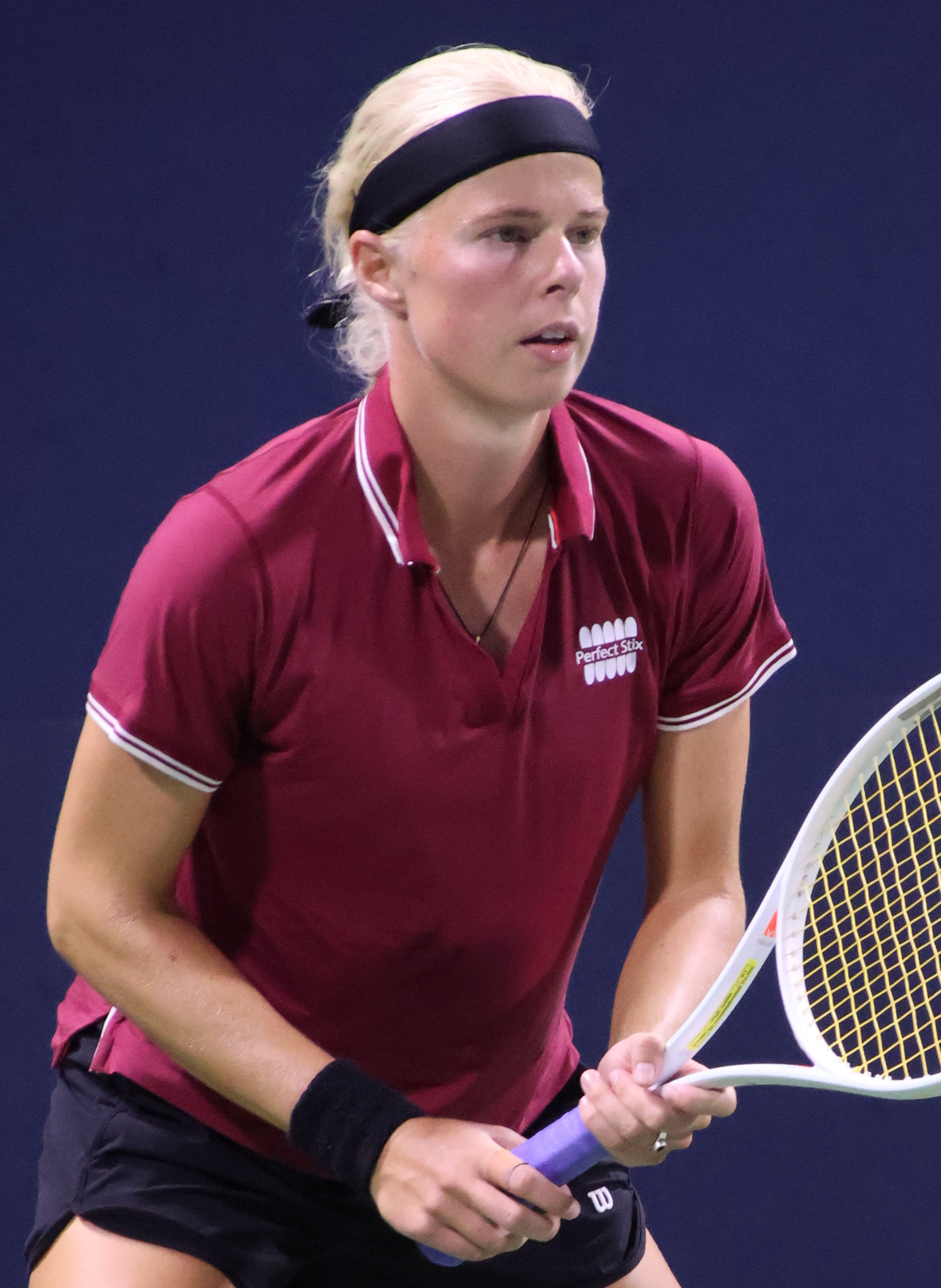
- Vedder at the 2026 US Open
- Country (sports): Netherlands
- Born: 23 November 1999 (age 26)
- Plays: Right (two-handed backhand)
- Prize money: $384,193

Singles
- Career record: 299–211
- Career titles: 6 ITF
- Highest ranking: No. 176 (12 October 2026)
- Current ranking: No. 179 (26 October 2026)

Grand Slam singles results
- Australian Open: Q1 (2023, 2026)
- US Open: Q1 (2025, 2026)

Doubles
- Career record: 245–125
- Career titles: 27 ITF
- Highest ranking: No. 110 (3 April 2023)
- Current ranking: No. 493 (26 October 2026)

Team competitions
- BJK Cup: 3–3
- Last updated on: 31 October 2026.

Eva Vedder (born 23 November 1999) is a Dutch tennis player. She has a career-high singles ranking of world No. 176, reached on 12 October 2026. She also has a career-high doubles ranking of No. 110 by the WTA, achieved on 3 April 2023. She has won six singles titles and 27 doubles titles on the ITF Women's Circuit.

== Career ==
In July 2022, Vedder won the first bigger doubles title of her career at the Torneo Internazionale Antico Tiro a Volo in Rome, partnering Andrea Gámiz.

Again partnering with Gámiz, she reached her first WTA 125 doubles final at the Bari Open in September 2022, losing there to Elisabetta Cocciaretto and Olga Danilović.

In July 2023, she made her WTA Tour debut at the Palermo Ladies Open where she lost to seventh seed Emma Navarro.

In June 2024, Vedder qualified for the main draw at her home tournament, the Rosmalen Open in 's-Hertogenbosch, but lost to Bianca Andreescu in her first WTA Tour match of the season.

== Personal life ==
Television presenter and actor Buddy Vedder is her brother.

== WTA 125 finals ==
=== Doubles: 1 (runner-up) ===
Result	Date	Tournament	Surface	Partner	Opponents	Score
Loss	Sep 2022	Bari Open, Italy	Clay	(Venezuela) Andrea Gámiz	(Italy) Elisabetta Cocciaretto (Serbia) Olga Danilović	2–6, 3–6

== ITF Circuit finals ==
=== Singles: 13 (6 titles, 7 runner-ups) ===
Legend W75 tournaments W50 tournaments W25 tournaments W15 tournaments	Finals by surface Hard (1–5) Clay (5–2)

Result	W–L	Date	Tournament	Tier	Surface	Opponent	Score
Win	1–0	May 2019	ITF Tabarka, Tunisia	W15	Clay	(Bulgaria) Ani Vangelova	6–1, 6–4
Win	2–0	Jul 2019	ITF Tabarka, Tunisia	W15	Clay	(France) Maëlys Bougrat	7–5, 6–3
Loss	2–1	Jan 2022	ITF Florianópolis, Brazil	W25	Hard	(United States) Elizabeth Mandlik	3–6, 4–6
Win	3–1	Apr 2022	ITF Santa Margherita di Pula, Italy	W25	Clay	(North Macedonia) Lina Gjorcheska	6–2, 6–3
Loss	3–2	Nov 2024	ITF Boca Raton, United States	W50	Hard	(United States) Whitney Osuigwe	6–7^{(8)}, 3–6
Loss	3–3	Jan 2025	Georgia's Rome Open, United States	W75	Hard (i)	(Canada) Victoria Mboko	5–7, 3–6
Loss	3–4	Jun 2025	ITF Palma del Río, Spain	W50	Hard	(United States) Clervie Ngounoue	1–6, 4–6
Win	4–4	Nov 2025	ITF Orlando, United States	W35	Clay	(Slovakia) Viktória Hrunčáková	6–3, 7–6^{(6)}
Loss	4–5	Apr 2026	ITF Charlotte, United States	W35	Clay	(United States) Amelia Honer	6–3, 2–6, 3–6
Loss	4–6	Jun 2026	Macha Lake Open, Czech Republic	W75	Clay	Julia Avdeeva	6–1, 3–6, 2–6
Win	5–6	Jun 2026	ITF Palma del Río, Spain	W50	Hard	(Australia) Elena Micic	6–4, 6–4
Win	6–6	Jul 2026	ITF The Hague, Netherlands	W75	Clay	(Croatia) Lea Bošković	6–4, 6–3
Loss	6–7	Sep 2026	The Campus Open, Portugal	W75	Hard	(Italy) Lisa Pigato	6–1, 0–6, 3–6

=== Doubles: 50 (27 titles, 23 runner-ups) ===
Legend W100 tournaments W60/75 tournaments W40 tournaments W25/35 tournaments W15 tournaments	Finals by surface Hard (11–7) Clay (16–16)

Result	W–L	Date	Tournament	Tier	Surface	Partner	Opponents	Score
Win	1–0	Jul 2018	ITF Amstelveen, Netherlands	W15	Clay	(Austria) Marlies Szupper	(United Kingdom) Emily Appleton (United States) Dasha Ivanova	6–3, 6–4
Win	2–0	Aug 2018	ITF Oldenzaal, Netherlands	W15	Clay	(Netherlands) Annick Melgers	(Netherlands) Dominique Karregat (Belgium) Eliessa Vanlangendonck	3–6, 6–2, [11–9]
Win	3–0	Nov 2018	ITF Stellenbosch, South Africa	W15	Hard	(Israel) Maya Tahan	(United States) Stephanie Kent (Russia) Anastasia Shaulskaya	6–3, 6–0
Win	4–0	Dec 2018	ITF Stellenbosch, South Africa	W15	Hard	(Israel) Maya Tahan	(Russia) Ekaterina Makarova (South Africa) Sari Stegmann	6–0, 6–4
Win	5–0	Feb 2019	ITF Monastir, Tunisia	W15	Hard	(Netherlands) Arianne Hartono	(Spain) Andrea Lázaro García (Greece) Despina Papamichail	6–4, 3–6, [10–7]
Loss	5–1	Feb 2019	ITF Tabarka, Tunisia	W15	Clay	(Netherlands) Stéphanie Visscher	(Chile) Bárbara Gatica (Brazil) Rebeca Pereira	3–6, 6–1, [5–10]
Loss	5–2	Jun 2019	ITF Alkmaar, Netherlands	W15	Clay	(Netherlands) Stéphanie Visscher	(United Kingdom) Emily Arbuthnott (Australia) Gabriella Da Silva-Fick	4–6, 6–1, [8–10]
Win	6–2	Jul 2019	ITF Tabarka, Tunisia	W15	Clay	(Netherlands) Stéphanie Visscher	(Bulgaria) Elizabeth Danailova (Belgium) Chelsea Vanhoutte	2–6, 6–2, [10–5]
Win	7–2	Aug 2019	ITF Tabarka, Tunisia	W15	Clay	(Netherlands) Stéphanie Visscher	(India) Sowjanya Bavisetti (India) Sravya Shivani Chilakalapudi	6–2, 6–2
Win	8–2	Aug 2019	ITF Oldenzaal, Netherlands	W15	Clay	(Netherlands) Stéphanie Visscher	(Germany) Julia Kimmelmann (Russia) Anna Pribylova	7–6^{(5)}, ret.
Loss	8–3	Sep 2019	ITF Santa Margherita di Pula, Italy	W25	Clay	(Netherlands) Stéphanie Visscher	(Russia) Alina Charaeva (Venezuela) Andrea Gámiz	6–7^{(1)}, 3–6
Win	9–3	Oct 2019	ITF Antalya, Turkey	W15	Hard	(Netherlands) Stéphanie Visscher	(Germany) Anna Gabric (Germany) Romy Kölzer	6–3, 6–0
Loss	9–4	Oct 2019	ITF Antalya, Turkey	W15	Hard	(Netherlands) Stéphanie Visscher	(Croatia) Mariana Dražić (North Macedonia) Lina Gjorcheska	5–7, 6–4, [7–10]
Win	10–4	Nov 2019	ITF Cancún, Mexico	W15	Hard	(Israel) Maya Tahan	(United States) Allura Zamarripa (United States) Maribella Zamarripa	6–4, 4–6, [10–2]
Win	11–4	Jan 2020	ITF Cancún, Mexico	W15	Hard	(Netherlands) Stéphanie Visscher	(Japan) Mayuka Aikawa (Japan) Utaka Kishigami	6–3, 6–4
Loss	11–5	Aug 2020	ITF Alkmaar, Netherlands	W15	Clay	(Netherlands) Stéphanie Visscher	(Netherlands) Suzan Lamens (France) Marine Partaud	5–7, 6–7^{(3)}
Win	12–5	Oct 2020	ITF Funchal, Portugal	W15	Hard	(Netherlands) Arianne Hartono	(Brazil) Ingrid Martins (Brazil) Beatriz Haddad Maia	4–6, 6–1, [10–7]
Loss	12–6	Nov 2020	ITF Las Palmas de Gran Canaria, Spain	25,000	Clay	(Netherlands) Suzan Lamens	(Belgium) Lara Salden (Belgium) Kimberley Zimmermann	1–6, 3–6
Loss	12–7	Feb 2021	ITF Villena, Spain	W15	Hard	(Netherlands) Stéphanie Visscher	(Spain) Alba Carrillo Marín (Spain) Ángela Fita Boluda	5–7, 5–7
Win	13–7	May 2021	ITF Monastir, Tunisia	W15	Hard	(Netherlands) Stéphanie Visscher	(United States) Emma Davis (Japan) Erika Sema	6–0, 6–4
Loss	13–8	May 2021	ITF Antalya, Turkiye	W15	Clay	(Netherlands) Stéphanie Visscher	(Germany) Katharina Hobgarski (Switzerland) Ylena In-Albon	3–6, 3–6
Loss	13–9	Jun 2021	ITF Alkmaar, Netherlands	W15	Clay	(Netherlands) Stéphanie Visscher	(Netherlands) Quirine Lemoine (Netherlands) Gabriella Mujan	4–6, 1–6
Win	14–9	Jul 2021	Telavi Open, Georgia	W25	Clay	(Netherlands) Stéphanie Visscher	(Argentina) Victoria Bosio (Italy) Angelica Moratelli	3–6, 6–4, [13–11]
Loss	14–10	Aug 2021	ITF Oldenzaal, Netherlands	W25	Clay	(Netherlands) Stéphanie Visscher	(Japan) Kanako Morisaki (Japan) Erika Sema	7–5, 3–6, [7–10]
Win	15–10	Sep 2021	ITF Johannesburg, South Africa	W25	Hard	(Netherlands) Stéphanie Visscher	(Russia) Amina Anshba (Russia) Vlada Koval	6–4, 6–4
Loss	15–11	Sep 2021	ITF Johannesburg 2	W25	Hard	(Netherlands) Stéphanie Visscher	(Switzerland) Jenny Dürst (Switzerland) Nina Stadler	7–6^{(5)}, 5–7, [9–11]
Win	16–11	Oct 2021	ITF Kiryat Motzkin, Israel	W25	Hard	(Netherlands) Quirine Lemoine	(Russia) Maria Bondarenko (France) Carole Monnet	6–0, 6–2
Loss	16–12	Jan 2022	ITF Blumenau-Gaspar, Brazil	W25	Clay	(United States) Sofia Sewing	(Venezuela) Andrea Gámiz (Chile) Bárbara Gatica	4–6, 1–6
Win	17–12	Apr 2022	ITF Santa Margherita di Pula	W25	Clay	(North Macedonia) Lina Gjorcheska	(Croatia) Lea Bošković (Croatia) Tena Lukas	7–5, 6–2
Loss	17–13	May 2022	Wiesbaden Open, Germany	W100	Clay	(Venezuela) Andrea Gámiz	(Russia) Amina Anshba (Hungary) Panna Udvardy	2–6, 4–6
Win	18–13	Jul 2022	ATV Open Roma, Italy	W60+H	Clay	(Venezuela) Andrea Gámiz	(France) Estelle Cascino (Italy) Camilla Rosatello	7–5, 2–6, [13–11]
Win	19–13	Jul 2022	Internazionali di Cordenons, Italy	W60+H	Clay	(Italy) Angelica Moratelli	(Colombia) Yuliana Lizarazo (Italy) Aurora Zantedeschi	6–3, 6–2
Loss	19–14	Feb 2023	ITF Orlando Pro, United States	W60	Hard	(Netherlands) Arianne Hartono	(United States) Ashlyn Krueger (United States) Robin Montgomery	5–7, 1–6
Loss	19–15	Feb 2023	ITF Santo Domingo, Dominican; Republic	W25	Hard	(Netherlands) Arianne Hartono	(United States) Jada Hart (United States) Rasheeda McAdoo	3–6, 3–6
Loss	19–16	Mar 2023	ITF Anapoima, Colombia	W40	Clay	(Venezuela) Andrea Gámiz	(Russia) Irina Khromacheva (Ukraine) Valeriya Strakhova	0–6, 6–1, [4–10]
Loss	19–17	Aug 2023	Internazionali di Cordenons, Italy	W60	Clay	(Netherlands) Isabelle Haverlag	(Italy) Angelica Moratelli (Italy) Camilla Rosatello	6–0, 2–6, [5–10]
Loss	19–18	Aug 2023	Koksijde, Belgium	W25	Hard	(Netherlands) Stéphanie Visscher	(Estonia) Maileen Nuudi (Sweden) Kajsa Rinaldo Persson	3–6, 6–2, [5–10]
Loss	19–19	Aug 2023	ITF Oldenzaal, Netherlands	W40	Clay	(Netherlands) Isabelle Haverlag	(Bulgaria) Gergana Topalova (Latvia) Daniela Vismane	5–7, 6–2, [5–10]
Win	20–19	Oct 2023	Lisboa Belém Open, Portugal	W40	Clay	(Venezuela) Andrea Gámiz	(Germany) Tayisiya Morderger (Germany) Yana Morderger	6–1, 6–2
Loss	20–20	Apr 2024	ITF Santa Margherita di Pula, Italy	W35	Clay	(Italy) Anastasia Abbagnato	(Poland) Martyna Kubka (Greece) Sapfo Sakellaridi	3–6, 6–3, [6–10]
Win	21–20	Apr 2024	ITF Santa Margherita di Pula	W35	Clay	(Poland) Martyna Kubka	(Greece) Eleni Christofi (Greece) Sapfo Sakellaridi	7–5, 6–3
Win	22–20	May 2024	ITF Santa Margherita di Pula	W35	Clay	(Venezuela) Andrea Gámiz	(Finland) Laura Hietaranta (Greece) Sapfo Sakellaridi	2–6, 6–2, [10–4]
Loss	22–21	May 2024	Open Villa de Madrid, Spain	W100	Clay	(Venezuela) Andrea Gámiz	(Australia) Destanee Aiava (Greece) Eleni Christofi	3–6, 6–2, [5–10]
Win	23–21	Jul 2024	Amstelveen Open, Netherlands	W35	Clay	(Netherlands) Michaëlla Krajicek	(Russia) Victoria Kan (Russia) Ekaterina Makarova	w/o
Win	24–21	Aug 2024	Ladies Open Amstetten, Austria	W75	Clay	(Spain) Yvonne Cavallé Reimers	(Czech Republic) Jesika Malečková (Czech Republic) Miriam Škoch	6–3, 6–2
Win	25–21	Sep 2024	ITF Santa Margherita di Pula	W35	Clay	(Spain) Aliona Bolsova	(Germany) Katharina Hobgarski (Czech Republic) Julie Štruplová	6–3, 6–3
Win	26–21	Oct 2024	Women's TEC Cup, Spain	W100	Hard	(Spain) Yvonne Cavallé Reimers	(Algeria) Inès Ibbou (Switzerland) Naïma Karamoko	7–5, 7–6^{(5)}
Win	27–21	Jan 2025	Vero Beach Open, US	W75	Clay	(United States) Carmen Corley	(France) Julie Belgraver (Netherlands) Jasmijn Gimbrère	6–2, 6–3
Loss	27–22	Jan 2025	Georgia's Rome Open, US	W75	Hard (i)	(United States) Whitney Osuigwe	(United States) Sophie Chang (United States) Angela Kulikov	6–7^{(3)}, 4–6
Loss	27–23	Apr 2026	ITF Charlotte, United States	W35	Clay	(Venezuela) Sofía Cabezas Domínguez	(Brazil) Luiza Fullana (Brazil) Thaísa Grana Pedretti	4–6, 2–6
