= Nicoleta Dascălu =

Romanian tennis player

- Full name: Nicoleta Cătălina Dascălu
- Country (sports): Romania
- Residence: Mărăcineni, Romania
- Born: 19 December 1995 (age 30) Pitești, Romania
- Height: 1.75 m (5 ft 9 in)
- Plays: Right (two-handed backhand)
- Prize money: US$ 108,783

Singles
- Career record: 230–150
- Career titles: 5 ITF
- Highest ranking: No. 266 (2 March 2020)

Doubles
- Career record: 92–70
- Career titles: 4 ITF
- Highest ranking: No. 240 (21 October 2019)

Nicoleta Cătălina Dascălu (born 19 December 1995) is a Romanian former professional tennis player.

Dascălu has career-high WTA rankings of 266 in singles and 240 in doubles. In her career, she won five singles titles and four doubles titles on the ITF Women's Circuit.

Dascălu made her WTA Tour main-draw debut at the 2016 Bucharest Open, in the doubles competition, partnering Irina Bara.

== ITF Circuit finals ==
Legend
$60,000 tournaments
$25,000 tournaments
$10/15,000 tournaments

=== Singles: 8 (5 titles, 3 runner-ups) ===
Result	W–L	Date	Tournament	Tier	Surface	Opponent	Score
Loss	0–1	Jun 2014	ITF Sibiu, Romania	10,000	Clay	(Romania) Patricia Maria Țig	2–6, 4–6
Win	1–1	Aug 2014	ITF Arad, Romania	10,000	Clay	(Romania) Diana Enache	6–3, 6–3
Win	2–1	May 2015	ITF Antalya, Turkey	10,000	Hard	(Mexico) Camila Fuentes	6–4, 6–4
Loss	2–2	Jul 2015	ITF Târgu Jiu, Romania	10,000	Clay	(Romania) Ioana Loredana Roșca	2–6, 6–4, 3–6
Loss	2–3	Oct 2015	ITF Antalya, Turkey	10,000	Hard	(Belarus) Aryna Sabalenka	4–6, 7–6^{(4)}, 5–7
Win	3–3	Jul 2017	ITF Focșani, Romania	15,000	Clay	(Moldova) Alexandra Perper	6–2, 6–2
Win	4–3	Nov 2017	ITF Antalya, Turkey	15,000	Clay	(Brazil) Carolina Alves	7–5, 6–3
Win	5–3	Oct 2019	Kiskút Open, Hungary	60,000	Clay (i)	(Romania) Irina Bara	7–5, 6–2

=== Doubles: 12 (4 titles, 8 runner-ups) ===
Result	W–L	Date	Tournament	Tier	Surface	Partner	Opponents	Score
Loss	0–1	Feb 2014	ITF Antalya, Turkey	10,000	Hard	(Romania) Raluca Șerban	(China) Li Yihong (China) Zhu Lin	6–3, 3–6, [3–10]
Loss	0–2	Jul 2014	ITF Galați, Romania	10,000	Hard	(Romania) Cristina Ene	(Russia) Ekaterina Lavrikova (Italy) Alessia Piran	5–7, 6–1, [4–10]
Loss	0–3	Feb 2015	ITF Port El Kantaoui, Tunisia	10,000	Hard	(Bulgaria) Julia Stamatova	(South Africa) Ilze Hattingh (South Africa) Michelle Sammons	5–7, 3–6
Win	1–3	May 2015	ITF Antalya, Turkey	10,000	Hard	(Romania) Andreea Ghițescu	(Mexico) Camila Fuentes (Turkey) Müge Topsel	6–3, 6–1
Loss	1–4	May 2015	ITF Antalya, Turkey	10,000	Hard	(Italy) Camilla Rosatello	(Bosnia and Herzegovina) Anita Husarić (Ukraine) Alyona Sotnikova	1–6, 2–6
Win	2–4	Oct 2015	ITF Antalya, Turkey	10,000	Hard	(Romania) Andreea Ghițescu	(Hungary) Anna Bondár (Hungary) Rebeka Stolmár	6–4, 3–6, [10–5]
Loss	2–5	Apr 2017	ITF Pula, Italy	25,000	Clay	(France) Sara Cakarevic	(Romania) Irina Bara (Croatia) Tereza Mrdeža	4–6, 2–6
Loss	2–6	Aug 2017	ITF Bad Saulgau, Germany	25,000	Clay	(Romania) Cristina Dinu	(Russia) Anna Kalinskaya (Turkey) İpek Soylu	2–6, 2–6
Win	3–6	Jun 2019	Internazionale di Roma, Italy	60,000+H	Clay	(Italy) Elisabetta Cocciaretto	(Brazil) Carolina Alves (Romania) Elena Bogdan	7–5, 4–6, [10–7]
Win	4–6	Jul 2019	Prague Open, Czech Republic	60,000	Clay	(Cyprus) Raluca Șerban	(Czech Republic) Lucie Hradecká (Czech Republic) Johana Marková	6–4, 6–4
Loss	4–7	Sep 2020	Přerov Cup, Czech Republic	25,000	Clay	(Cyprus) Raluca Șerban	(Slovakia) Chantal Škamlová (Czech Republic) Tereza Smitková	6–7^{(5)}, 6–7^{(4)}
Loss	4–8	Mar 2022	ITF Antalya, Turkey	25,000	Clay	(Belgium) Marie Benoît	(Japan) Funa Kozaki (Japan) Naho Sato	2–6, 4–6
