= Torneo Internazionale Femminile Antico Tiro a Volo =

Torneo Internazionale Femminile ATV Tennis Open
- 2026 ATV Tennis Open

WTA 125
- Event name: ATV Tennis Open (2023-), Torneo Internazionale Femminile ATV (-2022)
- Location: Rome, Italy
- Venue: Circolo Antico Tiro a Volo (ATV)
- Category: WTA 125
- Surface: Clay
- Draw: 32S/8Q/8D
- Prize money: €100,000
- Website: anticotiroavolo.it

Current champions (2026)
- Singles: (United Kingdom) Francesca Jones
- Doubles: (France) Estelle Cascino (China) Feng Shuo

The Torneo Internazionale Femminile ATV Tennis Open is a tournament for professional female tennis players played on outdoor clay courts in Rome, Italy. It is currently held as a WTA 125 tournament, upgraded from ITF Women's Circuit in 2025. It was held from 2005 to 2011 with the exception of 2009. The event was not held from 2012 to 2014, but it restarted in 2015. The event was previously a $100,000, $75,000, $60,000 and $25,000 ITF tournament.

== Past finals ==
=== Singles ===
Year	Champion	Runner-up	Score
2026	(United Kingdom) Francesca Jones	(Italy) Lucia Bronzetti	6–3, 6–1
2025	(Croatia) Petra Marčinko	Oksana Selekhmeteva	6–3, 4–6, 6–3
↑ WTA 125 ↑
2024	Oksana Selekhmeteva	(North Macedonia) Lina Gjorcheska	6–1, 7–6^{(7–3)}
2023	(Spain) Jéssica Bouzas Maneiro	(Cyprus) Raluca Șerban	6–2, 6–4
2022	(Croatia) Tara Würth	(France) Chloé Paquet	6–3, 6–4
2020–21	Tournament cancelled due to the COVID-19 pandemic		
2019	(Italy) Sara Errani	(Austria) Barbara Haas	6–1, 6–4
2018	(Ukraine) Dayana Yastremska	(Russia) Anastasia Potapova	6–1, 6–0
2017	(Ukraine) Kateryna Kozlova	(Colombia) Mariana Duque	7–6^{(8–6)}, 6–4
2016	(Spain) Sílvia Soler Espinosa	(Spain) Laura Pous Tió	2–6, 6–4, 7–5
2015	(Italy) Martina Trevisan	(Switzerland) Lisa Sabino	6–1, 6–3
2014–12	Not held		
2011	(United States) Christina McHale	(Russia) Ekaterina Ivanova	6–2, 6–4
2010	(Spain) Lourdes Domínguez Lino	(Italy) Romina Oprandi	5–7, 6–3, 6–3
2009	Not held		
2008	(Italy) Tathiana Garbin	(Austria) Yvonne Meusburger	6–4, 4–6, 7–6^{(8–6)}
2007	(Belgium) Caroline Maes	(Spain) Marta Marrero	6–4, 7–6^{(9–7)}
2006	(Italy) Anna Floris	(Russia) Marina Shamayko	6–3, 6–0
2005	(Italy) Romina Oprandi	(Romania) Magda Mihalache	6–4, 6–4

=== Doubles ===
Year	Champions	Runners-up	Score
2026	(France) Estelle Cascino (China) Feng Shuo	(Croatia) Lucija Ćirić Bagarić (Slovenia) Nika Radišić	6–4, 6–4
2025	(Chinese Taipei) Cho I-hsuan (Chinese Taipei) Cho Yi-tsen	(Georgia (country)) Ekaterine Gorgodze (Latvia) Darja Semeņistaja	4–6, 6–4, [10–6]
↑ WTA 125 ↑
2024	(Switzerland) Leonie Küng (India) Vasanti Shinde	(Italy) Matilde Paoletti (Italy) Beatrice Ricci	4–6, 6–4, [10–7]
2023	Yuliya Hatouka (Kazakhstan) Zhibek Kulambayeva	(Colombia) Yuliana Lizarazo (Colombia) María Paulina Pérez	6–4, 6–4
2022	(Venezuela) Andrea Gámiz (Netherlands) Eva Vedder	(France) Estelle Cascino (Italy) Camilla Rosatello	7–5, 2–6, [13–11]
2020–21	Tournament cancelled due to the COVID-19 pandemic		
2019	(Italy) Elisabetta Cocciaretto (Romania) Nicoleta Dascălu	(Brazil) Carolina Alves (Romania) Elena Bogdan	7–5, 4–6, [10–7]
2018	(Brazil) Laura Pigossi (Mexico) Renata Zarazúa	(Italy) Anastasia Grymalska (Italy) Giorgia Marchetti	6–1, 4–6, [13–11]
2017	(Russia) Anastasiya Komardina (Argentina) Nadia Podoroska	(Netherlands) Quirine Lemoine (Netherlands) Eva Wacanno	7–6^{(7–3)}, 6–3
2016	(Turkey) İpek Soylu (China) Xu Shilin	(Hungary) Réka Luca Jani (Georgia (country)) Sofia Shapatava	7–5, 6–1
2015	(Italy) Claudia Giovine (Greece) Despina Papamichail	(United Kingdom) Tara Moore (Switzerland) Conny Perrin	6–4, 7–6^{(7–2)}
2014–12	Not held		
2011	(Australia) Sophie Ferguson (Australia) Sally Peers	(Poland) Magda Linette (Romania) Liana Ungur	Walkover
2010	(United States) Christina McHale (Australia) Olivia Rogowska	(Belarus) Iryna Kuryanovich (Netherlands) Arantxa Rus	6–4, 6–1
2009	Not held		
2008	(Poland) Klaudia Jans (Poland) Alicja Rosolska	(Russia) Alina Jidkova (Canada) Marie-Ève Pelletier	6–3, 6–1
2007	(Poland) Marta Domachowska (Finland) Emma Laine	(Estonia) Maret Ani (Belgium) Caroline Maes	1–0, ret.
2006	(Argentina) Denise Kirbijikian (Argentina) Jessica Orselli	(Czech Republic) Veronika Raimrová (Romania) Anamaria-Alexandra Sere	Walkover
2005	(Spain) Adriana González Peñas (Italy) Romina Oprandi	(Germany) Gréta Arn (Czech Republic) Janette Bejlková	6–3, 6–3
